= List of awards and nominations received by Jon Stewart =

Jon Stewart awards and nominations
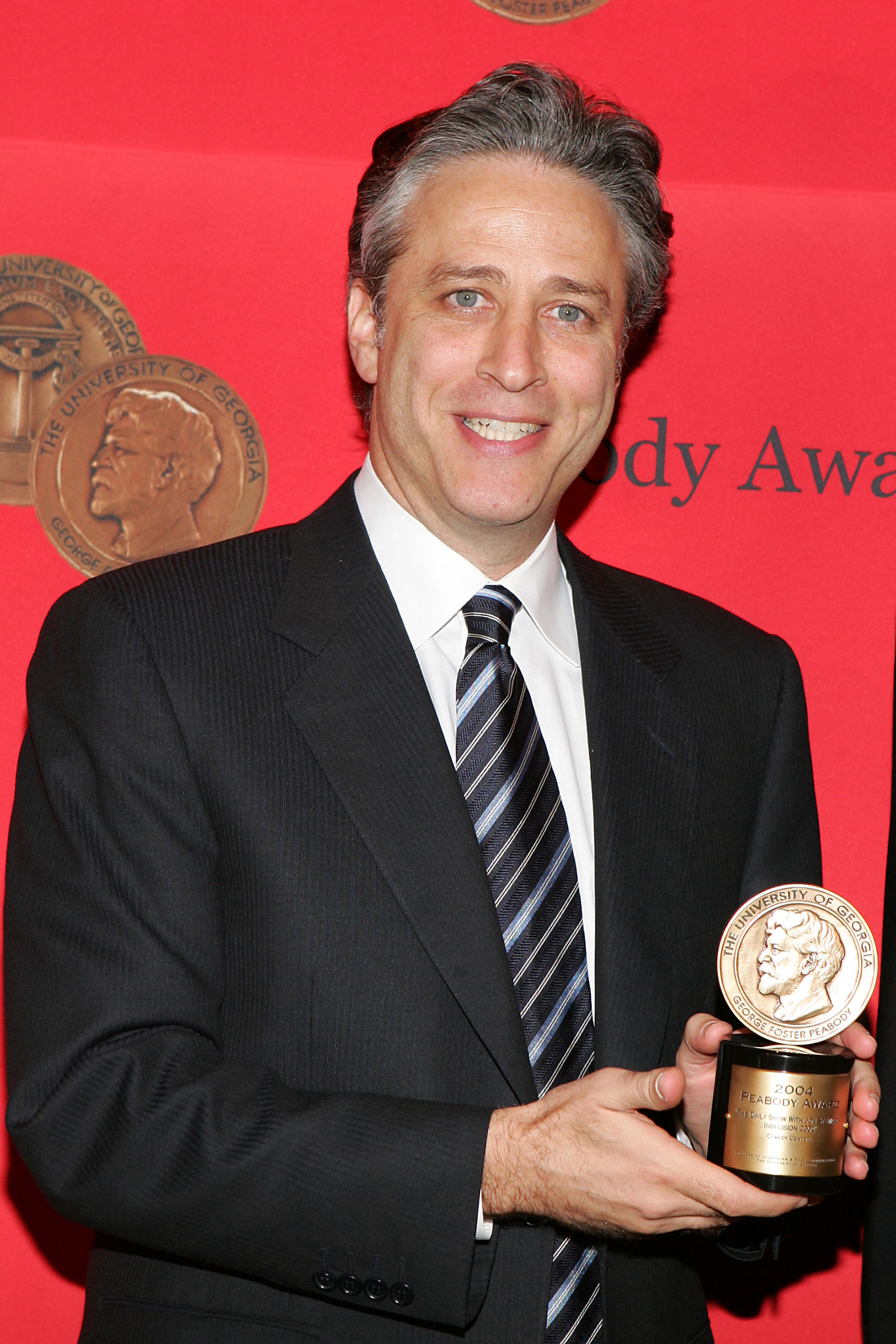
- Stewart receiving a Peabody Award in 2005
Awards and nominations
Award	Wins	Nominations
Emmy Award	24	64
Grammy Award	2	2

Totals (Note: Certain award groups do not simply award one winner. They acknowledge several different recipients, have runners-up, and have third place. Since this is a specific recognition and is different from losing an award, runner-up mentions are considered wins in this award tally. For simplification and to avoid errors, each award in this list has been presumed to have had a prior nomination.)
- Wins: 58
- Nominations: 154

The following is a list of awards and nominations received by American comedian Jon Stewart.

Stewart is an American comedian writer, producer, political commentator, actor, and television host. He served as the host of The Jon Stewart Show (1993–1995) on MTV. From 1999 to 2015 he served as the host of The Daily Show with Jon Stewart on Comedy Central, returning in 2024. He also hosted the Apple TV+ series The Problem with Jon Stewart from 2021 to 2023.

He has received two Daytime Emmy Award nominations and 64 Primetime Emmy Award nominations winning 24 awards for his work on The Daily Show and The Colbert Report, and for producing The Late Show with Stephen Colbert. He has also received two Grammy Award nominations winning twice for Best Comedy Album for America (The Book): A Citizen's Guide to Democracy Inaction in 2005 and Best Spoken Word Album for Earth (The Book): A Visitor's Guide to the Human Race in 2011.

He has also received five Peabody Awards for his work on The Daily Show with Jon Stewart in 2000 and 2004, The Colbert Report in 2007, and 2011, and for the final season of The Daily Show with Jon Stewart in 2015. He has received twelve Producers Guild of America Award nominations winning seven times for The Daily Show and ten Writers Guild of America Awards winning once for The Daily Show.

== Major associations ==
=== BAFTA TV Awards ===
Year	Category	Nominated work	Result	Ref.
2009	Best International Programme	The Daily Show with Jon Stewart	Nominated	

=== Emmy Awards ===
Year	Category	Nominated work	Result	Ref.
Primetime Emmy Awards
2001	Outstanding Variety, Music or Comedy Series	The Daily Show with Jon Stewart	Nominated	
2001	Outstanding Writing for a Variety, Music or Comedy Program	The Daily Show with Jon Stewart	Won	
2002	Outstanding Variety, Music or Comedy Series	The Daily Show with Jon Stewart	Nominated	
2002	Outstanding Writing for a Variety, Music or Comedy Program	The Daily Show with Jon Stewart	Nominated	
2002	Outstanding Individual Performance in a Variety or Music Program	The Daily Show with Jon Stewart	Nominated	
2003	Outstanding Variety, Music or Comedy Series	The Daily Show with Jon Stewart	Won	
2003	Outstanding Writing for a Variety, Music or Comedy Program	The Daily Show with Jon Stewart	Won	
2003	Outstanding Individual Performance in a Variety or Music Program	The Daily Show with Jon Stewart	Nominated	
2004	Outstanding Variety, Music or Comedy Series	The Daily Show with Jon Stewart	Won	
2004	Outstanding Writing for a Variety, Music or Comedy Program	The Daily Show with Jon Stewart	Won	
2005	Outstanding Variety, Music or Comedy Series	The Daily Show with Jon Stewart	Won	
2005	Outstanding Writing for a Variety, Music or Comedy Program	The Daily Show with Jon Stewart	Won	
2005	Outstanding Individual Performance in a Variety or Music Program	The Daily Show with Jon Stewart	Nominated	
2006	Outstanding Variety, Music or Comedy Series	The Daily Show with Jon Stewart	Won	
2006	Outstanding Writing for a Variety, Music or Comedy Program	The Daily Show with Jon Stewart	Won	
2006	Outstanding Variety, Music or Comedy Series	The Colbert Report	Nominated	
2007	Outstanding Variety, Music or Comedy Series	The Daily Show with Jon Stewart	Won	
2007	Outstanding Writing for a Variety, Music or Comedy Program	The Daily Show with Jon Stewart	Nominated	
2007	Outstanding Individual Performance in a Variety or Music Program	The Daily Show with Jon Stewart	Nominated	
2007	Outstanding Variety, Music or Comedy Series	The Colbert Report	Nominated	
2008	Outstanding Variety, Music or Comedy Series	The Daily Show with Jon Stewart	Won	
2008	Outstanding Writing for a Variety, Music or Comedy Program	The Daily Show with Jon Stewart	Nominated	
2008	Outstanding Variety, Music or Comedy Series	The Colbert Report	Nominated	
2008	Outstanding Individual Performance in a Variety or Music Program	80th Academy Awards	Nominated	
2009	Outstanding Variety, Music or Comedy Series	The Daily Show with Jon Stewart	Won	
2009	Outstanding Writing for a Variety, Music or Comedy Program	The Daily Show with Jon Stewart	Won	
2009	Outstanding Variety, Music or Comedy Series	The Colbert Report	Nominated	
2010	Outstanding Variety, Music or Comedy Series	The Daily Show with Jon Stewart	Won	
2010	Outstanding Writing for a Variety, Music or Comedy Program	The Daily Show with Jon Stewart	Nominated	
2010	Outstanding Variety, Music or Comedy Series	The Colbert Report	Nominated	
2011	Outstanding Variety, Music or Comedy Series	The Daily Show with Jon Stewart	Won	
2011	Outstanding Writing for a Variety, Music or Comedy Program	The Daily Show with Jon Stewart	Won	
2011	Outstanding Variety, Music or Comedy Series	The Colbert Report	Nominated	
2012	Outstanding Variety Series	The Daily Show with Jon Stewart	Won	
2012	Outstanding Writing for a Variety Series	The Daily Show with Jon Stewart	Won	
2012	Outstanding Variety Series	The Colbert Report	Nominated	
2013	Outstanding Variety Series	The Daily Show with Jon Stewart	Nominated	
2013	Outstanding Writing for a Variety Series	The Daily Show with Jon Stewart	Nominated	
2013	Outstanding Variety Series	The Colbert Report	Won	
2014	Outstanding Variety Series	The Daily Show with Jon Stewart	Nominated	
2014	Outstanding Writing for a Variety Series	The Daily Show with Jon Stewart	Nominated	
2014	Outstanding Variety Series	The Colbert Report	Won	
2015	Outstanding Variety Talk Series	The Daily Show with Jon Stewart	Won	
2015	Outstanding Writing for a Variety Series	The Daily Show with Jon Stewart	Won	
2015	Outstanding Variety Talk Series	The Colbert Report	Nominated	
2017	Outstanding Variety Talk Series	The Late Show With Stephen Colbert	Nominated	
2017	Outstanding Variety Special	Stephen Colbert's Live Election Night Democracy's Series Finale: Who's Going to Clean Up This Sh*t?	Nominated	
2018	Outstanding Variety Talk Series	The Late Show with Stephen Colbert	Nominated	
2018	Outstanding Variety Special (Live)	Night of Too Many Stars	Nominated	
2019	Outstanding Variety Talk Series	The Late Show with Stephen Colbert	Nominated	
2020	Outstanding Variety Talk Series	The Late Show with Stephen Colbert	Nominated	
2021	Outstanding Variety Talk Series	The Late Show with Stephen Colbert	Nominated	
2021	Outstanding Variety Special (Live)	Stephen Colbert's Election Night 2020: Democracy's Last Stand Building Back America Great Again Better	Won	
2022	Outstanding Hosted Nonfiction Series or Special	The Problem with Jon Stewart	Nominated	
2022	Outstanding Writing for a Nonfiction Programming	The Problem with Jon Stewart	Nominated	
2022	Outstanding Variety Talk Series	The Late Show with Stephen Colbert	Nominated	
2023	Outstanding Talk Series	The Problem with Jon Stewart	Nominated	
2023	Outstanding Variety Talk Series	The Late Show with Stephen Colbert	Nominated	
2024	Outstanding Talk Series	The Daily Show	Won	
2024	Outstanding Writing for a Variety Series	The Daily Show	Nominated	
2024	Primetime Emmy Award for Outstanding Short Form Nonfiction or Reality Series	The Daily Show – After the Cut	Nominated	
2024	Outstanding Variety Talk Series	The Late Show with Stephen Colbert	Nominated	
2025	Outstanding Talk Series	The Daily Show	Nominated	
2025	Outstanding Writing for a Variety Series	The Daily Show	Nominated	
2025	Outstanding Variety Talk Series	The Late Show with Stephen Colbert	Won	
Daytime Emmy Awards
2011	Outstanding Special Class Special	Rally to Restore Sanity and/or Fear	Nominated	
2011	Outstanding Special Class Writing	Rally to Restore Sanity and/or Fear	Nominated	

=== Grammy Awards ===
Year	Category	Nominated work	Result	Ref.
2005	Best Comedy Album	America (The Book): A Citizen's Guide to Democracy Inaction	Won	
2011	Best Spoken Word Album	Earth (The Book): A Visitor's Guide to the Human Race	Won	

=== Peabody Awards ===
Year	Category	Nominated work	Result	Ref.
2000	Peabody Award	The Daily Show with Jon Stewart	Won	
2005	Peabody Award	The Daily Show with Jon Stewart	Won	
2008	Peabody Award	The Colbert Report	Won	
2012	Peabody Award	The Colbert Report	Won	
2016	Peabody Award	The Daily Show with Jon Stewart	Won	

== Guild awards ==
=== Producers Guild Awards ===
Year	Category	Nominated work	Result	Ref.
2008	Outstanding Producer of Live Entertainment & Competition Television	The Colbert Report	Won	
2009	Outstanding Producer of Live Entertainment & Competition Television	The Colbert Report	Won	
2010	Outstanding Producer of Live Entertainment & Competition Television	The Colbert Report	Won	
2011	Outstanding Producer of Live Entertainment & Competition Television	The Colbert Report	Won	
2012	Outstanding Producer of Live Entertainment & Talk Television	The Colbert Report	Won	
2013	Outstanding Producer of Live Entertainment & Talk Television	The Colbert Report	Won	
2014	Outstanding Producer of Live Entertainment & Talk Television	The Colbert Report	Won	
2015	Outstanding Producer of Live Entertainment & Talk Television	The Colbert Report	Nominated	
2016	Outstanding Producer of Live Entertainment & Talk Television	The Colbert Report	Nominated	
2018	Outstanding Producer of Live Entertainment & Talk Television	The Late Show With Stephen Colbert	Nominated	
2019	Outstanding Producer of Live Entertainment & Talk Television	The Late Show with Stephen Colbert	Nominated	
2020	Outstanding Producer of Live Entertainment & Talk Television	The Late Show With Stephen Colbert	Nominated	
2021	Outstanding Producer of Live Entertainment & Talk Television	The Late Show With Stephen Colbert	Nominated	
2022	Outstanding Producer of Live Entertainment, Variety, Sketch, Standup & Talk Television	The Late Show With Stephen Colbert	Nominated	
2023	Outstanding Producer of Live Entertainment, Variety, Sketch, Standup & Talk Television	The Late Show With Stephen Colbert	Nominated	
2025	Outstanding Producer of Live Entertainment, Variety, Sketch, Standup & Talk Television	The Late Show With Stephen Colbert	Nominated	
2025	Outstanding Producer of Live Entertainment, Variety, Sketch, Standup & Talk Television	The Daily Show	Nominated	

=== Writers Guild Awards ===
Year	Category	Nominated work	Result	Ref.
2007	Comedy/Variety – (Including Talk) Series	The Daily Show with Jon Stewart	Nominated	
2008	Comedy/Variety (Including Talk) – Series	The Daily Show with Jon Stewart	Nominated	
2009	Comedy/Variety (Including Talk) – Series	The Daily Show with Jon Stewart	Nominated	
2010	Comedy/Variety (Including Talk) – Series	The Daily Show with Jon Stewart	Won	
2011	Comedy/Variety (Including Talk) – Series	The Daily Show with Jon Stewart	Nominated	
2012	Comedy/Variety (Including Talk) – Series	The Daily Show with Jon Stewart	Nominated	
2013	Comedy/Variety (Including Talk) – Series	The Daily Show with Jon Stewart	Nominated	
2014	Comedy/Variety (Including Talk) – Series	The Daily Show with Jon Stewart	Nominated	
2015	Comedy/Variety (Including Talk) – Series	The Daily Show with Jon Stewart	Nominated	
2016	Comedy/Variety – Talk Series	The Daily Show with Jon Stewart	Nominated	
2022	Comedy/Variety – Talk Series	The Problem with Jon Stewart	Nominated	
2023	Comedy/Variety – Talk Series	The Problem with Jon Stewart	Nominated	
2023	Comedy/Variety – Specials	The Problem with Jon Stewart: Election Wrap-Up Special	Nominated	
2024	Comedy/Variety – Talk Series	The Problem with Jon Stewart	Nominated	
2025	Comedy/Variety – Talk or Sketch Series	The Daily Show	Nominated	

== Critics awards ==
=== Astra Awards ===
Year	Category	Nominated work	Result	Ref.
2021	Best Variety Series, Talk Show, or Comedy/Variety Special	The Late Show with Stephen Colbert	Nominated	
2022	Best Streaming Variety Sketch Series, Talk Series, or Special	The Problem with Jon Stewart	Nominated	
2023	Best Talk Show	The Problem with Jon Stewart	Nominated	
2023	Best Talk Show	The Late Show with Stephen Colbert	Nominated	
2024	Best Talk Series	The Daily Show	Nominated	
2024	Best Talk Series	The Late Show with Stephen Colbert	Nominated	
2025	Best Talk Series	The Daily Show	Won	
2025	Best Talk Series	The Late Show with Stephen Colbert	Nominated	

=== Critics' Choice Television Awards ===
Year	Category	Nominated work	Result	Ref.
2011	Best Talk Show	The Daily Show with Jon Stewart	Won	
2012	Best Talk Show	The Daily Show with Jon Stewart	Nominated	
2013	Best Talk Show	The Daily Show with Jon Stewart	Won	
2014	Best Talk Show	The Daily Show with Jon Stewart	Nominated	
2014	Best Talk Show	The Colbert Report	Nominated	
2015	Best Talk Show	The Daily Show with Jon Stewart	Won	
2016	Best Talk Show	The Daily Show with Jon Stewart	Nominated	
2019	Best Late-Night Talk Show	The Late Show with Stephen Colbert	Nominated	
2021	Best Talk Show	The Late Show with Stephen Colbert	Nominated	
2024	Best Talk Show	The Late Show with Stephen Colbert	Nominated	
2025	Best Talk Show	The Daily Show	Nominated	
2025	Best Talk Show	The Late Show with Stephen Colbert	Nominated	

=== TCA Awards ===
Year	Category	Nominated work	Result	Ref.
2003	Program of the Year	The Daily Show with Jon Stewart	Nominated	
2003	Outstanding Achievement in Comedy	The Daily Show with Jon Stewart	Won	
2003	Outstanding Achievement in News and Information	The Daily Show with Jon Stewart	Nominated	
2003	Individual Achievement in Comedy	The Daily Show with Jon Stewart	Won	
2004	Program of the Year	The Daily Show with Jon Stewart	Nominated	
2004	Outstanding Achievement in Comedy	The Daily Show with Jon Stewart	Nominated	
2004	Outstanding Achievement in News and Information	The Daily Show with Jon Stewart	Won	
2004	Individual Achievement in Comedy	The Daily Show with Jon Stewart	Nominated	
2005	Program of the Year	The Daily Show with Jon Stewart	Nominated	
2005	Outstanding Achievement in Comedy	The Daily Show with Jon Stewart	Nominated	
2005	Outstanding Achievement in News and Information	The Daily Show with Jon Stewart	Nominated	
2005	Individual Achievement in Comedy	The Daily Show with Jon Stewart	Won	
2006	Outstanding Achievement in Comedy	The Daily Show with Jon Stewart	Won	
2006	Outstanding New Program	The Colbert Report	Nominated	
2006	Individual Achievement in Comedy	The Daily Show with Jon Stewart	Nominated	
2007	Outstanding Achievement in Comedy	The Daily Show with Jon Stewart	Won	
2007	Individual Achievement in Comedy	The Daily Show with Jon Stewart	Nominated	
2008	Outstanding Achievement in Comedy	The Daily Show with Jon Stewart	Won	
2008	Outstanding Achievement in Comedy	The Colbert Report	Nominated	
2009	Outstanding Achievement in Comedy	The Daily Show with Jon Stewart	Won	
2010	Outstanding Achievement in News and Information	The Daily Show with Jon Stewart	Nominated	
2011	Individual Achievement in Comedy	The Daily Show with Jon Stewart	Nominated	
2012	Outstanding Achievement in News and Information	The Daily Show with Jon Stewart	Nominated	
2013	Outstanding Achievement in News and Information	The Daily Show with Jon Stewart	Nominated	
2014	Outstanding Achievement in News and Information	The Daily Show with Jon Stewart	Nominated	
2015	Outstanding Achievement in News and Information	The Daily Show with Jon Stewart	Nominated	
2018	Outstanding Achievement in Sketch/Variety Shows	The Late Show with Stephen Colbert	Nominated	
2019	Outstanding Achievement in Sketch/Variety Shows	The Late Show with Stephen Colbert	Nominated	
2020	Outstanding Achievement in Sketch/Variety Shows	The Late Show with Stephen Colbert	Nominated	
2021	Outstanding Achievement in Sketch/Variety Shows	The Late Show with Stephen Colbert	Nominated	
2022	Outstanding Achievement in Sketch/Variety Shows	The Late Show with Stephen Colbert	Nominated	
2023	Outstanding Achievement in Sketch/Variety Shows	The Late Show with Stephen Colbert	Nominated	
2025	Outstanding Achievement in Sketch/Variety Shows	The Daily Show	Nominated	
2025	Outstanding Achievement in Sketch/Variety Shows	The Late Show with Stephen Colbert	Nominated	

== Miscellaneous awards ==
Year	Award	Nominated work	Result
2001	American Comedy Award for Funniest Male Performer in a TV Special	The Daily Show with Jon Stewart	Nominated
2002	Teen Choice Award for Choice TV – Personality	The Daily Show with Jon Stewart	Nominated
2003	Teen Choice Award for Choice TV – Late Night	The Daily Show with Jon Stewart	Nominated
2005	People's Choice Award for Favorite Late Night Talk Show Host	The Daily Show with Jon Stewart	Nominated
2005	People's Choice Award for Favorite Funny Male Star	The Daily Show with Jon Stewart	Nominated
2005	Special Recognition Award	The Daily Show with Jon Stewart	Won
2005	Thurber Prize for American Humor	America (The Book): A Citizen's Guide to Democracy Inaction	Won
2005	Satellite Award for Best Television Series – Musical or Comedy	The Daily Show with Jon Stewart	Won
2005	Satellite Award for Best Television Series – Musical or Comedy	The Colbert Report	Nominated
2006	Satellite Award for Best Television Series – Musical or Comedy	The Colbert Report	Nominated
2007	ASTRA Award for Favourite International Personality or Actor	The Daily Show with Jon Stewart	Nominated
2008	Satellite Award for Best Television Series – Musical or Comedy	The Colbert Report	Nominated
2009	ASTRA Award for Favourite International Program	The Daily Show with Jon Stewart	Nominated
2009	Dorian Award for Savage Wit of the Year	The Daily Show with Jon Stewart	Nominated
2009	Dorian Award for Campy TV Show of the Year	The Colbert Report	Nominated
2011	Dorian Award for Wilde Wit of the Year	The Daily Show with Jon Stewart	Nominated
2011	Dorian Award for Campy TV Show of the Year	The Colbert Report	Nominated
2011	The Comedy Award for Late Night Comedy Series	The Daily Show with Jon Stewart	Won
2011	The Comedy Award for Late Night Comedy Series	The Colbert Report	Nominated
2012	The Comedy Award for Late Night Comedy Series	The Daily Show with Jon Stewart	Won
2012	The Comedy Award for Late Night Comedy Series	The Colbert Report	Nominated
2013	Dorian Award for Wilde Wit of the Year		Won
2013	GLAAD Media Award for Outstanding Talk Show Episode	The Daily Show with Jon Stewart for "Bishop Gene Robinson"	Nominated
2014	American Comedy Award for Best Late Night Talk Show	The Daily Show with Jon Stewart	Won
2014	American Comedy Award for Best Late Night Talk Show	The Colbert Report	Won
2014	Freedom of Expression Award	Rosewater	Won
2014	Phoenix Film Critics Society Award for Breakthrough Performance Behind the Camera	Rosewater	Nominated
2015	Slammy Award for Best Celebrity Moment of the Year	Getting involved in John Cena's match at SummerSlam	Nominated
2016	NAACP Image Award for Outstanding Talk Series	The Nightly Show with Larry Wilmore	Nominated
2018	Dorian Award for TV Current Affairs Show of the Year	The Late Show with Stephen Colbert	Nominated
2019	Dorian Award for TV Current Affairs Show of the Year	The Late Show with Stephen Colbert	Nominated
2019	GLAAD Media Award for Outstanding Talk Show Episode	The Late Show with Stephen Colbert	Nominated
2019	People's Choice Award for The Nighttime Talk Show of 2019	The Late Show with Stephen Colbert	Nominated
2020	Dorian Award for TV Current Affairs Show of the Year	The Late Show with Stephen Colbert	Nominated
2020	GLAAD Media Award for Outstanding Talk Show Episode	The Late Show with Stephen Colbert	Won
2020	People's Choice Award for The Nighttime Talk Show of 2020	The Late Show with Stephen Colbert	Nominated
2021	Dorian Award for TV Current Affairs Show of the Year	The Late Show with Stephen Colbert	Nominated
2021	People's Choice Award for The Nighttime Talk Show of 2021	The Late Show with Stephen Colbert	Nominated
2022	Dorian Award for TV Current Affairs Show of the Year	The Late Show with Stephen Colbert	Nominated
2022	People's Choice Award for The Nighttime Talk Show of 2022	The Late Show with Stephen Colbert	Nominated
2023	GLAAD Media Award for Outstanding Talk Show Episode	The Problem with Jon Stewart	Won
2023	Dorian Award for TV Current Affairs Show of the Year	The Late Show with Stephen Colbert	Nominated
2024	People's Choice Award for The Nighttime Talk Show of the Year	The Late Show with Stephen Colbert	Nominated
2024	GLAAD Media Award for Outstanding Talk Show Episode	The Problem with Jon Stewart	Nominated
2024	Dorian Award for TV Current Affairs Show of the Year	The Late Show with Stephen Colbert	Nominated
2025	GLAAD Media Award for Outstanding Talk Show Episode	The Daily Show	Nominated
2025	Dorian Award for TV Current Affairs Show of the Year	The Daily Show	Nominated

== Honors ==
Year	Award	Result	Ref.
2022	Mark Twain Prize for American Humor	Honored	

- 2019 – Stewart received the Bronze Medallion for his "tireless advocacy, inspiration, and leadership (helping to) pass the permanent authorization of the September 11th Victim Compensation Fund Act"
