= List of awards and nominations received by Stephen Colbert =

Stephen Colbert awards and nominations
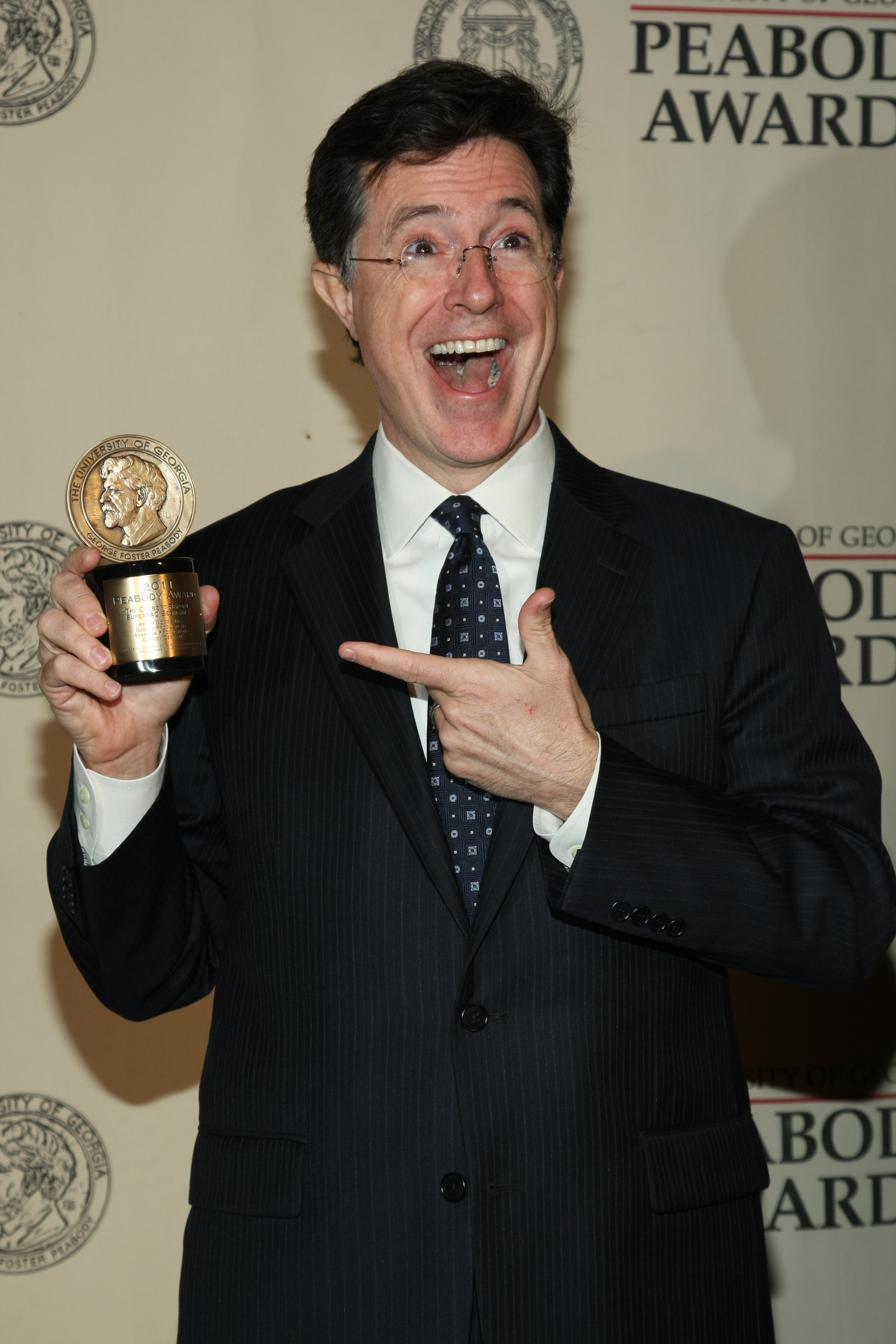
- Colbert receiving a Peabody Award at the 71st Annual Peabody Awards Luncheon in 2012
Awards and nominations
Award	Wins	Nominations
Emmy Award	14	55
Grammy Award	2	3

Totals (Note: Certain award groups do not simply award one winner. They acknowledge several different recipients, have runners-up, and have third place. Since this is a specific recognition and is different from losing an award, runner-up mentions are considered wins in this award tally. For simplification and to avoid errors, each award in this list has been presumed to have had a prior nomination.)
- Wins: 42
- Nominations: 136

The following is a list of awards and nominations received by American comedian Stephen Colbert.

Colbert is an American comedian writer, producer, political commentator, actor, and television host. He worked as a correspondent on The Daily Show with Jon Stewart (1997–2005) before receiving his own show, The Colbert Report (2005–2014), both on Comedy Central. He has since gone on to replace David Letterman and now hosting The Late Show with Stephen Colbert (2015–2026) on CBS.

He has received two Daytime Emmy Award nominations and 52 Primetime Emmy Award nominations, winning 14 awards for his work on The Daily Show, The Colbert Report, The Late Show, and a 2020 election special that aired on Showtime. He has also received three Grammy Award nominations, winning twice for Best Comedy Album for A Colbert Christmas: The Greatest Gift of All! in 2010 and for Best Spoken Word Album for America Again in 2014.

He has also received five Peabody Awards for his work on The Daily Show in 2000 and 2004, The Colbert Report in 2007, and 2011, and The Late Show for 2020. He has received twelve Producers Guild of America Award nominations, winning six times for The Daily Show, and twelve Writers Guild of America Awards, winning four awards for The Colbert Report.

== Major associations ==
=== Emmy Awards ===
Year	Category	Nominated work	Result	Ref.
Primetime Emmy Awards
2004	Outstanding Writing for a Variety, Music or Comedy Program	The Daily Show with Jon Stewart	Won	
2005	Outstanding Writing for a Variety, Music or Comedy Program	The Daily Show with Jon Stewart	Won	
2006	Outstanding Writing for a Variety, Music or Comedy Program	The Daily Show with Jon Stewart	Won	
2006	Outstanding Writing for a Variety, Music or Comedy Program	The Colbert Report	Nominated	
2006	Outstanding Variety, Music or Comedy Series	The Colbert Report	Nominated	
2006	Outstanding Individual Performance in a Variety or Music Program	The Colbert Report	Nominated	
2007	Outstanding Variety, Music or Comedy Series	The Colbert Report	Nominated	
2007	Outstanding Writing for a Variety, Music or Comedy Program	The Colbert Report	Nominated	
2007	Outstanding Individual Performance in a Variety or Music Program	The Colbert Report	Nominated	
2008	Outstanding Variety, Music or Comedy Series	The Colbert Report	Nominated	
2008	Outstanding Writing for a Variety, Music or Comedy Program	The Colbert Report	Won	
2008	Outstanding Individual Performance in a Variety or Music Program	The Colbert Report	Nominated	
2009	Outstanding Variety, Music or Comedy Series	The Colbert Report	Nominated	
2009	Outstanding Writing for a Variety, Music or Comedy Program	The Colbert Report	Nominated	
2010	Outstanding Variety, Music or Comedy Series	The Colbert Report	Nominated	
2010	Outstanding Writing for a Variety, Music or Comedy Program	The Colbert Report	Won	
2011	Outstanding Variety, Music or Comedy Series	The Colbert Report	Nominated	
2011	Outstanding Writing for a Variety, Music or Comedy Program	The Colbert Report	Nominated	
2012	Outstanding Variety Series	The Colbert Report	Nominated	
2012	Outstanding Writing for a Variety Series	The Colbert Report	Nominated	
2013	Outstanding Variety Series	The Colbert Report	Won	
2013	Outstanding Writing for a Variety Series	The Colbert Report	Won	
2014	Outstanding Variety Series	The Colbert Report	Won	
2014	Outstanding Writing for a Variety Series	The Colbert Report	Won	
2015	Outstanding Variety Talk Series	The Colbert Report	Nominated	
2015	Outstanding Writing for a Variety Series	The Colbert Report	Nominated	
2016	Outstanding Variety Special	The Kennedy Center Honors	Nominated	
2017	Outstanding Variety Special	Stephen Colbert's Live Election Night Democracy's Series Finale: Who's Going to Clean Up This Sh*t?	Nominated	
2017	Outstanding Writing for A Variety Special	Stephen Colbert's Live Election Night Democracy's Series Finale: Who's Going to Clean Up This Sh*t?	Nominated	
2017	Outstanding Variety Talk Series	The Late Show With Stephen Colbert	Nominated	
2017	Outstanding Writing for a Variety Series	The Late Show With Stephen Colbert	Nominated	
2018	Outstanding Variety Talk Series	The Late Show With Stephen Colbert	Nominated	
2018	Outstanding Writing for a Variety Series	The Late Show With Stephen Colbert	Nominated	
2019	Outstanding Variety Talk Series	The Late Show With Stephen Colbert	Nominated	
2019	Outstanding Writing for a Variety Series	The Late Show With Stephen Colbert	Nominated	
2019	Outstanding Interactive Program	The Late Show With Stephen Colbert	Nominated	
2020	Outstanding Variety Talk Series	The Late Show With Stephen Colbert	Nominated	
2020	Outstanding Writing for a Variety Series	The Late Show With Stephen Colbert	Nominated	
2021	Outstanding Variety Talk Series	The Late Show With Stephen Colbert	Nominated	
2021	Outstanding Writing for a Variety Series	The Late Show With Stephen Colbert	Nominated	
2021	Outstanding Short Form Comedy, Drama or Variety Series	Stephen Colbert Presents Tooning Out the News	Nominated	
2021	Outstanding Variety Special (Live)	Stephen Colbert’s Election Night 2020: Democracy’s Last Stand: Building Back America Great Again Better 2020	Won	
2021	Outstanding Writing for a Variety Special	Stephen Colbert’s Election Night 2020: Democracy’s Last Stand: Building Back America Great Again Better 2020	Nominated	
2022	Outstanding Variety Talk Series	The Late Show With Stephen Colbert	Nominated	
2022	Outstanding Writing for a Variety Series	The Late Show With Stephen Colbert	Nominated	
2022	Outstanding Short Form Comedy, Drama or Variety Series	Stephen Colbert Presents Tooning Out the News	Nominated	
2023	Outstanding Talk Series	The Late Show With Stephen Colbert	Nominated	
2023	Outstanding Writing for a Variety Series	The Late Show With Stephen Colbert	Nominated	
2024	Outstanding Talk Series	The Late Show With Stephen Colbert	Nominated	
2025	Outstanding Talk Series	The Late Show With Stephen Colbert	Won	
2026	Outstanding Variety Series	The Late Show With Stephen Colbert	Won	
2026	Outstanding Writing for a Variety Series	The Late Show With Stephen Colbert	Won	
2026	Outstanding Short Form Comedy, Drama or Variety Series	The Late Show with Stephen Colbert — Colbert Before Air	Won	
Daytime Emmy Awards
2011	Outstanding Special Class Special	Rally to Restore Sanity and/or Fear	Nominated	
2011	Outstanding Special Class Writing	Rally to Restore Sanity and/or Fear	Nominated	

=== Grammy Awards ===
Year	Category	Nominated work	Result	Ref.
2009	Best Spoken Word Album	I Am America (And So Can You!)	Nominated	
2010	Best Comedy Album	A Colbert Christmas: The Greatest Gift of All!	Won	
2014	Best Spoken Word Album	America Again	Won	

=== Peabody Awards ===
Year	Category	Nominated work	Result	Ref.
2000	Peabody Award	The Daily Show with Jon Stewart	Won	
2004	Peabody Award	The Daily Show with Jon Stewart	Won	
2007	Peabody Award	The Colbert Report	Won	
2011	Peabody Award	The Colbert Report	Won	
2020	Peabody Award	The Late Show with Stephen Colbert	Won	

== Guild awards ==
=== Producers Guild Awards ===
Year	Award	Nominated work	Result
2008	Outstanding Producer of Live Entertainment & Competition Television	The Colbert Report	Won
2009	Outstanding Producer of Live Entertainment & Competition Television	The Colbert Report	Won
2010	Outstanding Producer of Live Entertainment & Competition Television	The Colbert Report	Won
2011	Outstanding Producer of Live Entertainment & Competition Television	The Colbert Report	Won
2012	Outstanding Producer of Live Entertainment & Talk Television	The Colbert Report	Won
2013	Outstanding Producer of Live Entertainment & Talk Television	The Colbert Report	Won
2014	Outstanding Producer of Live Entertainment & Talk Television	The Colbert Report	Won
2015	Outstanding Producer of Live Entertainment & Talk Television	The Colbert Report	Nominated
2016	Outstanding Producer of Live Entertainment & Talk Television	The Colbert Report	Nominated
2018	Outstanding Producer of Live Entertainment & Talk Television	The Late Show With Stephen Colbert	Nominated
2019	Outstanding Producer of Live Entertainment & Talk Television	The Late Show With Stephen Colbert	Nominated
2020	Outstanding Producer of Live Entertainment & Talk Television	The Late Show With Stephen Colbert	Nominated
2021	Outstanding Producer of Live Entertainment & Talk Television	The Late Show With Stephen Colbert	Nominated
2022	Outstanding Producer of Live Entertainment, Variety, Sketch, Standup & Talk Television	The Late Show With Stephen Colbert	Nominated
2023	Outstanding Producer of Live Entertainment, Variety, Sketch, Standup & Talk Television	The Late Show With Stephen Colbert	Nominated
2025	Outstanding Producer of Live Entertainment, Variety, Sketch, Standup & Talk Television	The Late Show With Stephen Colbert	Nominated
2026	Outstanding Producer of Live Entertainment, Variety, Sketch, Standup & Talk Television	The Late Show With Stephen Colbert	Won

=== Writers Guild Awards ===
Year	Award	Nominated work	Result
2008	Comedy/Variety (Including Talk) – Series	The Colbert Report	Won
2009	Comedy/Variety (Including Talk) – Series	The Colbert Report	Nominated
2010	Comedy/Variety (Including Talk) – Series	The Colbert Report	Nominated
2011	Comedy/Variety (Including Talk) – Series	The Colbert Report	Won
2012	Comedy/Variety (Including Talk) – Series	The Colbert Report	Won
2013	Comedy/Variety (Including Talk) – Series	The Colbert Report	Nominated
2014	Comedy/Variety (Including Talk) – Series	The Colbert Report	Won
2015	Comedy/Variety (Including Talk) – Series	The Colbert Report	Nominated
2016	Comedy/Variety – Talk Series	The Late Show with Stephen Colbert	Nominated
2017	Comedy/Variety – Talk Series	The Late Show with Stephen Colbert	Nominated
2018	Comedy/Variety – Talk Series	The Late Show with Stephen Colbert	Nominated
2019	Comedy/Variety – Talk Series	The Late Show with Stephen Colbert	Nominated
2020	Comedy/Variety – Talk Series	The Late Show with Stephen Colbert	Nominated
2021	Comedy/Variety – Talk Series	The Late Show with Stephen Colbert	Nominated
2023	Comedy/Variety – Talk Series	Stephen Colbert Presents Tooning Out the News	Nominated
2024	Comedy/Variety – Talk Series	The Late Show with Stephen Colbert	Nominated
2025	Comedy/Variety – Talk or Sketch Series	The Late Show with Stephen Colbert	Nominated
2026	Comedy/Variety – Talk or Sketch Series	The Late Show with Stephen Colbert	Nominated

== Critics awards ==
=== Astra Awards ===
Year	Award	Nominated work	Result
2021	Best Variety Series, Talk Show, or Comedy/Variety Special	The Late Show with Stephen Colbert	Nominated
2023	Best Talk Show	The Late Show with Stephen Colbert	Nominated
2024	Best Talk Series	The Late Show with Stephen Colbert	Nominated
2025	Best Talk Series	The Late Show with Stephen Colbert	Nominated
2026	Best Talk or Variety Series	The Late Show with Stephen Colbert	Won

=== Critics' Choice Television Awards ===
Year	Award	Nominated work	Result
2014	Best Talk Show	The Colbert Report	Nominated
2019	Best Late-Night Talk Show	The Late Show with Stephen Colbert	Nominated
2019	Best Show Host	The Late Show with Stephen Colbert	Nominated
2021	Best Talk Show	The Late Show with Stephen Colbert	Nominated
2024	Best Talk Show	The Late Show with Stephen Colbert	Nominated
2025	Best Talk Show	The Late Show with Stephen Colbert	Nominated
2026	Best Talk Show	The Late Show with Stephen Colbert	Nominated

=== TCA Awards ===
Year	Award	Nominated work	Result
2006	Outstanding New Program	The Colbert Report	Nominated
2006	Individual Achievement in Comedy	The Colbert Report	Nominated
2007	Individual Achievement in Comedy	The Colbert Report	Nominated
2008	Outstanding Achievement in Comedy	The Colbert Report	Nominated
2008	Individual Achievement in Comedy	The Colbert Report	Nominated
2018	Outstanding Achievement in Sketch/Variety Shows	The Late Show with Stephen Colbert	Nominated
2019	Outstanding Achievement in Sketch/Variety Shows	The Late Show with Stephen Colbert	Nominated
2020	Outstanding Achievement in Sketch/Variety Shows	The Late Show with Stephen Colbert	Nominated
2021	Outstanding Achievement in Sketch/Variety Shows	The Late Show with Stephen Colbert	Nominated
2022	Outstanding Achievement in Sketch/Variety Shows	The Late Show with Stephen Colbert	Nominated
2023	Outstanding Achievement in Sketch/Variety Shows	The Late Show with Stephen Colbert	Nominated
2025	Outstanding Achievement in Sketch/Variety Shows	The Late Show with Stephen Colbert	Nominated
2026	Program of the Year	The Late Show with Stephen Colbert	Nominated
2026	Outstanding Achievement in Sketch/Variety Shows	The Late Show with Stephen Colbert	Won
2026	Career Achievement Award		Won

== Other awards ==
Year	Award	Nominated work	Result
1995	CableACE Award for Comedy Series	Exit 57	Nominated
2005	Satellite Award for Best Television Series – Musical or Comedy	The Colbert Report	Nominated
2005	Satellite Award for Best Actor – Television Series Musical or Comedy	The Colbert Report	Nominated
2006	Satellite Award for Best Television Series – Musical or Comedy	The Colbert Report	Nominated
2006	Satellite Award for Best Actor – Television Series Musical or Comedy	The Colbert Report	Nominated
2007	Spike Guys' Choice Award for Gutsiest Move	2006 White House Correspondents' Association Dinner	Won
2007	Satellite Award for Best Actor – Television Series Musical or Comedy	The Colbert Report	Won
2008	Satellite Award for Best Television Series – Musical or Comedy	The Colbert Report	Nominated
2009	Dorian Award for Savage Wit of the Year	The Colbert Report	Nominated
2009	Dorian Award for Campy TV Show of the Year	The Colbert Report	Nominated
2009	Satellite Award for Best Actor – Television Series Musical or Comedy	The Colbert Report	Nominated
2011	Dorian Award for Savage Wit of the Year	The Colbert Report	Nominated
2011	Dorian Award for Campy TV Show of the Year	The Colbert Report	Nominated
2011	The Comedy Award for Late Night Comedy Series	The Colbert Report	Nominated
2012	The Comedy Award for Late Night Comedy Series	The Colbert Report	Nominated
2013	Dorian Award for Wilde Wit of the Year		Nominated
2014	People's Choice Award for Favorite Late Night Talk Show Host	The Colbert Report	Won
2014	American Comedy Award for Best Late Night Talk Show	The Colbert Report	Won
2015	Dorian Award for Wilde Wit of the Year		Nominated
2016	People's Choice Award for Favorite Late Night Talk Show Host	The Late Show with Stephen Colbert	Nominated
2017	People's Choice Award for Favorite Late Night Talk Show Host	The Late Show with Stephen Colbert	Nominated
2018	Dorian Award for TV Current Affairs Show of the Year	The Late Show with Stephen Colbert	Nominated
2018	Dorian Award for Wilde Wit of the Year		Nominated
2019	Dorian Award for TV Current Affairs Show of the Year	The Late Show with Stephen Colbert	Nominated
2019	GLAAD Media Award for Outstanding Talk Show Episode	The Late Show with Stephen Colbert	Nominated
2019	People's Choice Award for The Nighttime Talk Show of 2019	The Late Show with Stephen Colbert	Nominated
2020	Dorian Award for TV Current Affairs Show of the Year	The Late Show with Stephen Colbert	Nominated
2020	GLAAD Media Award for Outstanding Talk Show Episode	The Late Show with Stephen Colbert	Won
2020	People's Choice Award for The Nighttime Talk Show of 2020	The Late Show with Stephen Colbert	Nominated
2021	Dorian Award for TV Current Affairs Show of the Year	The Late Show with Stephen Colbert	Nominated
2021	People's Choice Award for The Nighttime Talk Show of 2021	The Late Show with Stephen Colbert	Nominated
2022	Dorian Award for TV Current Affairs Show of the Year	The Late Show with Stephen Colbert	Nominated
2022	People's Choice Award for The Nighttime Talk Show of 2022	The Late Show with Stephen Colbert	Nominated
2023	Dorian Award for TV Current Affairs Show of the Year	The Late Show with Stephen Colbert	Nominated
2024	People's Choice Award for The Nighttime Talk Show of the Year	The Late Show with Stephen Colbert	Nominated
2024	Dorian Award for TV Current Affairs Show of the Year	The Late Show with Stephen Colbert	Nominated
2025	Robert F. Kennedy Human Rights Ripple of Hope Award		Won
2026	GLAAD Media Award for Outstanding Variety or Talk Show Episode	The Late Show with Stephen Colbert	Nominated
2026	Dorian Award for TV Current Affairs Show of the Year	The Late Show with Stephen Colbert	Won
