= List of awards and nominations received by Trevor Noah =

Trevor Noah awards and nominations
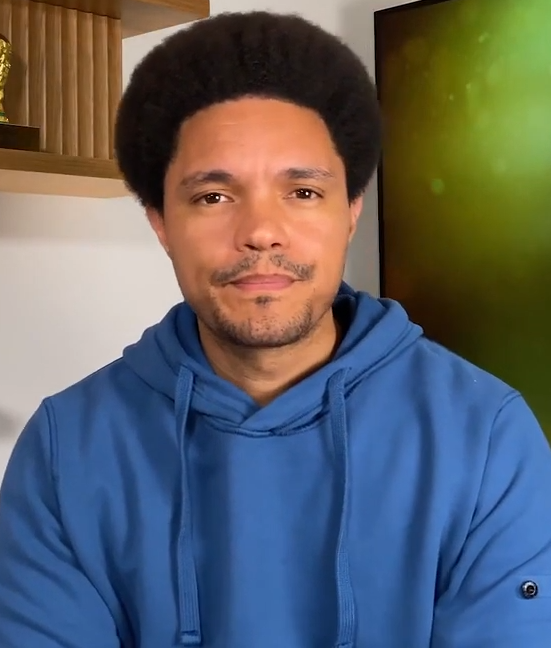
- Noah at the Peabody Awards in 2021
Awards and nominations
Award	Wins	Nominations
Emmy Awards	2	20
Critics' Choice Awards	0	9
Golden Globe Awards	0	1
Grammy Awards	0	4

Totals (Note: Certain award groups do not simply award one winner. They acknowledge several different recipients, have runners-up, and have third place. Since this is a specific recognition and is different from losing an award, runner-up mentions are considered wins in this award tally. For simplification and to avoid errors, each award in this list has been presumed to have had a prior nomination.)
- Wins: 22
- Nominations: 98

Trevor Noah is a South African comedian and talk show host. Over his career he has received two Primetime Emmy Awards (out of 20 nominations) as well as nominations for a Golden Globe Award and two Grammy Awards.

Noah gained notoriety as a correspondent on the Comedy Central political satire talk series The Daily Show with Jon Stewart from 2014 to 2015 before replacing Stewart and hosting the show from 2015 to 2022. After five nominations, he ultimately won the Primetime Emmy Award for Outstanding Talk Series at the 76th Primetime Emmy Awards. He also received the Primetime Emmy Award for Outstanding Short Form Variety Series for The Daily Show with Trevor Noah – Between the Scenes in 2017.

For his work as a standup comedian, he has received two nominations for the Grammy Award for Best Comedy Album for Trevor Noah: Son of Patricia (2020) and Trevor Noah: I Wish You Would (2024). For the later, he was also nominated for the Golden Globe Award for Best Performance in Stand-Up Comedy on Television and the Primetime Emmy Award for Outstanding Variety Special (Pre-Recorded).

== Major associations ==
=== Emmy Awards ===
Year	Category	Nominated work	Result	Ref.
Primetime Emmy Awards
2017	Outstanding Short Form Variety Series	The Daily Show with Trevor Noah – Between the Scenes	Won	
2018	Outstanding Variety Talk Series	The Daily Show with Trevor Noah	Nominated	
2018	Outstanding Interactive Program	The Daily Show with Trevor Noah	Nominated	
2018	Outstanding Short Form Variety Series	The Daily Show with Trevor Noah – Between the Scenes	Nominated	
2019	Outstanding Variety Talk Series	The Daily Show with Trevor Noah	Nominated	
2019	Outstanding Interactive Program	The Daily Show with Trevor Noah	Nominated	
2020	Outstanding Variety Talk Series	The Daily Show with Trevor Noah	Nominated	
2020	Outstanding Writing for a Variety Series	The Daily Show with Trevor Noah	Nominated	
2020	Outstanding Short Form Nonfiction or Reality Series	The Daily Show with Trevor Noah – Between the Scenes	Nominated	
2021	Outstanding Variety Talk Series	The Daily Show with Trevor Noah	Nominated	
2021	Outstanding Variety Special (Live)	63rd Annual Grammy Awards	Nominated	
2022	Outstanding Variety Talk Series	The Daily Show with Trevor Noah	Nominated	
2022	Outstanding Writing for a Variety Series	The Daily Show with Trevor Noah	Nominated	
2022	Outstanding Short Form Nonfiction or Reality Series	The Daily Show with Trevor Noah – Between the Scenes	Nominated	
2022	Outstanding Variety Special (Live)	64th Annual Grammy Awards	Nominated	
2023	Outstanding Talk Series	The Daily Show with Trevor Noah	Won	
2023	Outstanding Writing for a Variety Series	The Daily Show with Trevor Noah	Nominated	
2023	Outstanding Variety Special (Pre-Recorded)	Trevor Noah: I Wish You Would	Nominated	
2024	Outstanding Variety Special (Live)	66th Annual Grammy Awards	Nominated	
2024	Outstanding Variety Special (Pre-Recorded)	Trevor Noah: Where Was I	Nominated	
2026	Outstanding Variety Special (Live)	68th Annual Grammy Awards	Nominated	

=== Golden Globe Awards ===
Year	Category	Nominated work	Result	Ref.
2023	Best Performance in Stand-Up Comedy on Television	Trevor Noah: Where Was I	Nominated	

=== Grammy Awards ===
Year	Category	Nominated work	Result	Ref.
2020	Best Comedy Album	Trevor Noah: Son of Patricia	Nominated	
2024	Best Comedy Album	Trevor Noah: I Wish You Would	Nominated	
2025	Best Comedy Album	Trevor Noah: Where Was I?	Nominated	
2026	Best Audio Book, Narration & Storytelling Recording	Into the Uncut Grass	Nominated	

== Miscellaneous awards ==
Year	Association	Category	Nominated work	Result	Ref.
2021	Academy of Television Arts & Sciences	Television Academy Honor	The Daily Show with Trevor Noah	Won	
2021	Astra Awards	Best Variety Series, Talk Show, or Comedy/Variety Special	The Daily Show with Trevor Noah	Nominated	
2022	Astra Awards	Best Variety Series, Talk Show, or Comedy/Variety Special	The Daily Show with Trevor Noah	Nominated	
2023	Astra Awards	Best Talk Series	The Daily Show with Trevor Noah	Won	
2024	Astra Awards	Best Stand Up or Comedy Special	Trevor Noah: Where Was I	Nominated	
2019	Critics' Choice Real TV Awards	Best Late-Night Talk Show	The Daily Show with Trevor Noah	Nominated	
2020	Critics' Choice Real TV Awards	Male Star of The Year	The Daily Show with Trevor Noah	Nominated	
2020	Critics' Choice Real TV Awards	Best Short Form Series	The Daily Show with Trevor Noah – Between the Scenes	Nominated	
2021	Critics' Choice Real TV Awards	Male Star of The Year	The Daily Show with Trevor Noah	Nominated	
2022	Critics' Choice Real TV Awards	Male Star of The Year	The Daily Show with Trevor Noah	Nominated	
2022	Critics' Choice Real TV Awards	Best Show Host	The Daily Show with Trevor Noah	Nominated	
2016	Critics' Choice Television Award	Best Talk Show	The Daily Show with Trevor Noah	Nominated	
2020	Critics' Choice Television Award	Best Comedy Special	Trevor Noah: Son of Patricia	Nominated	
2023	Critics' Choice Television Award	Best Comedy Special	Trevor Noah: Where Was I	Nominated	
2019	Dorian Awards	TV Current Affairs Show of the Year	The Daily Show with Trevor Noah	Nominated	
2020	Dorian Awards	Best Current Affairs Program	The Daily Show with Trevor Noah	Nominated	
2020	Dorian Awards	Wilde Wit Award	The Daily Show with Trevor Noah	Nominated	
2022	Dorian Awards	Best Current Affairs Program	The Daily Show with Trevor Noah	Nominated	
2023	Dorian Awards	Best Current Affairs Program	The Daily Show with Trevor Noah	Nominated	
2023	Erasmus Prize		Himself	Won	
2017	GLAAD Media Award	Outstanding Variety or Talk Show Episode	The Daily Show with Trevor Noah	Won	
2018	GLAAD Media Award	Outstanding Variety or Talk Show Episode	The Daily Show with Trevor Noah	Nominated	
2018	GLAAD Media Award	Outstanding Variety or Talk Show Episode	The Opposition with Jordan Klepper	Nominated	
2020	GLAAD Media Award	Outstanding Variety or Talk Show Episode	The Daily Show with Trevor Noah	Nominated	
2021	GLAAD Media Award	Outstanding Variety or Talk Show Episode	The Daily Show with Trevor Noah	Nominated	
2022	GLAAD Media Award	Outstanding Variety or Talk Show Episode	The Daily Show with Trevor Noah	Nominated	
2014	MTV Africa Music Awards	Personality of the Year	Himself	Nominated	
2015	MTV Africa Music Awards	Personality of the Year	Himself	Won	
2017	MTV Movie & TV Awards	Best Host	The Daily Show with Trevor Noah	Won	
2019	MTV Movie & TV Awards	Best Host	The Daily Show with Trevor Noah	Nominated	
2021	MTV Movie & TV Awards	Best Talk/Topical Show	The Daily Show with Trevor Noah	Won	
2022	MTV Movie & TV Awards	Best Talk/Topical Show	The Daily Show with Trevor Noah	Nominated	
2016	NAACP Image Awards	Outstanding Talk Series	The Daily Show with Trevor Noah	Nominated	
2016	NAACP Image Awards	Outstanding Variety (Series or Special)	The Daily Show with Trevor Noah	Nominated	
2016	NAACP Image Awards	Outstanding Host in a Variety (Series or Special)	The Daily Show with Trevor Noah	Nominated	
2017	NAACP Image Awards	Outstanding Literary Work – Biography / Auto-biography	The Daily Show with Trevor Noah	Won	
2017	NAACP Image Awards	Outstanding Literary Work – Debut Author	The Daily Show with Trevor Noah	Won	
2018	NAACP Image Awards	Outstanding Talk Series	The Daily Show with Trevor Noah	Nominated	
2018	NAACP Image Awards	Outstanding Host in a Talk or News/Information (Series or Special)	The Daily Show with Trevor Noah	Nominated	
2019	NAACP Image Awards	Outstanding Talk Series	The Daily Show with Trevor Noah	Nominated	
2019	NAACP Image Awards	Outstanding Host in a Talk or News/Information (Series or Special)	The Daily Show with Trevor Noah	Nominated	
2019	NAACP Image Awards	Outstanding Writing in a Comedy Series	The Daily Show with Trevor Noah	Won	
2019	NAACP Image Awards	Outstanding Variety (Series or Special)	Trevor Noah: Son of Patricia	Nominated	
2020	NAACP Image Awards	Outstanding Talk Series	The Daily Show with Trevor Noah	Nominated	
2020	NAACP Image Awards	Outstanding Host in a Talk or News/Information (Series or Special)	The Daily Show with Trevor Noah	Nominated	
2020	NAACP Image Awards	Outstanding Writing in a Comedy Series	The Daily Show with Trevor Noah	Nominated	
2021	NAACP Image Awards	Entertainer of the Year	The Daily Show with Trevor Noah	Nominated	
2021	NAACP Image Awards	Outstanding Talk Series	The Daily Show with Trevor Noah	Nominated	
2021	NAACP Image Awards	Outstanding Host in a Talk or News/Information (Series or Special)	The Daily Show with Trevor Noah	Won	
2021	NAACP Image Awards	Outstanding Short-Form Series – Reality/Nonfiction	The Daily Show with Trevor Noah – Between the Scenes	Won	
2022	NAACP Image Awards	Outstanding Talk Series	The Daily Show with Trevor Noah	Won	
2022	NAACP Image Awards	Outstanding Host in a Reality/Competition, Game Show or Variety	The Daily Show with Trevor Noah	Won	
2022	NAACP Image Awards	Outstanding Short-Form Series (Drama or Comedy)	The Daily Show with Trevor Noah – Between the Scenes	Won	
2023	NAACP Image Awards	Outstanding Variety Show (Series or Special)	The Daily Show with Trevor Noah	Won	
2023	NAACP Image Awards	Outstanding Host in a Reality/Competition, Game Show or Variety	The Daily Show with Trevor Noah	Nominated	
2023	NAACP Image Awards	Outstanding Short Form Series – Comedy or Drama	The Daily Show with Trevor Noah – Between the Scenes	Won	
2024	National Film and Television Awards	Celebrity Personality of the Year		Won	
2017	Nickelodeon Kids' Choice Award	Favourite African Star	Himself	Won	
2018	People's Choice Awards	The Nighttime Talk Show of 2018	The Daily Show with Trevor Noah	Nominated	
2019	People's Choice Awards	The Nighttime Talk Show of 2019	The Daily Show with Trevor Noah	Nominated	
2020	People's Choice Awards	The Nighttime Talk Show of 2020	The Daily Show with Trevor Noah	Nominated	
2021	People's Choice Awards	The Nighttime Talk Show of 2021	The Daily Show with Trevor Noah	Nominated	
2022	People's Choice Awards	The Nighttime Talk Show of 2022	The Daily Show with Trevor Noah	Nominated	
2023	People's Choice Awards	The Comedy Act of the Year	Off the Record	Nominated	
2019	Producers Guild of America Award	Outstanding Producer of Live Entertainment & Talk Television	The Daily Show with Trevor Noah	Nominated	
2020	Producers Guild of America Award	Outstanding Producer of Live Entertainment & Talk Television	The Daily Show with Trevor Noah	Nominated	
2021	Producers Guild of America Award	Outstanding Producer of Live Entertainment & Talk Television	The Daily Show with Trevor Noah	Nominated	
2022	Producers Guild of America Award	Outstanding Producer of Live Entertainment & Talk Television	The Daily Show with Trevor Noah	Nominated	
2023	Producers Guild of America Award	Outstanding Producer of Live Entertainment & Talk Television	The Daily Show with Trevor Noah	Nominated	
2012	South African Comics' Choice Award	Comic of the Year		Won	
2014	South African Comics' Choice Award	Comic of the Year		Nominated	
2020	TCA Awards	Outstanding Achievement in Sketch/Variety Shows	The Daily Show	Nominated	
2021	TCA Awards	Outstanding Achievement in Variety, Talk or Sketch	The Daily Show	Nominated	
2017	Thurber House	American Humor	Born a Crime	Won	
2017	Writers Guild of America Award	Comedy/Variety – Talk Series	The Daily Show with Trevor Noah	Nominated	
2018	Writers Guild of America Award	Comedy/Variety – Talk Series	The Daily Show with Trevor Noah	Nominated	
2017	Zora Neale Hurston Award		Born a Crime	Won	

== Special recognitions ==
- 2017 – "The 35 Most Powerful People in New York Media" by The Hollywood Reporter
- 2018 - "The 35 Most Powerful People in New York Media" by The Hollywood Reporter
- 2018 – Time magazine's 100 most influential people in the world.
