= I Think You Should Leave with Tim Robinson =

American sketch comedy series

- Genre: Sketch comedy; Cringe comedy
- Created by: Tim Robinson; Zach Kanin
- Starring: Tim Robinson
- Opening theme: "Big Flame (Is Gonna Break My Heart In Two)" by Doris Wilson
- Country of origin: United States
- Original language: English
- No. of seasons: 3
- No. of episodes: 18

Production
- Executive producers: Zach Kanin; Tim Robinson; Andy Samberg; Akiva Schaffer; Jorma Taccone; Becky Sloviter; Alex Bach; Dan Powell; Ali Bell; Alice Mathias
- Producer: Jay Patumanoan
- Running time: 16–18 minutes
- Production companies: Lonely Island Classics; Irony Point; Zanin Corp

Original release
- Network: Netflix
- Release: April 23, 2019 – May 30, 2023

I Think You Should Leave with Tim Robinson is an American sketch comedy television series created by Tim Robinson and Zach Kanin, with Robinson also starring in most of the sketches. The first season premiered on Netflix on April 23, 2019, while the second season was released on July 6, 2021. The series was renewed for a third season in May 2022, which premiered on May 30, 2023. The series leans heavily on cringe comedy, with elements of surreal humor. It has received positive reviews from critics throughout its three seasons.

== Production ==
The series is executive produced by Robinson and Kanin; Lonely Island members Andy Samberg, Akiva Schaffer and Jorma Taccone; and Alex Bach and Daniel Powell of Irony Point. Guest stars across all three seasons include Kanin, Sam Richardson, Patti Harrison, Conner O'Malley and Tim Heidecker alongside Samberg, Fred Armisen, Vanessa Bayer, Beck Bennett, Kate Berlant, Julia Butters, Ayo Edebiri, Will Forte, Paul Walter Hauser, Bob Odenkirk, Cecily Strong, Jason Schwartzman, Brandon Wardell, Fred Willard and Steven Yeun. The first season premiered on April 23, 2019.

After the release of the first season, the series was renewed for a second season on June 19, 2019. Production on the second season was delayed by the COVID-19 pandemic. It was eventually released on July 6, 2021. The series was renewed for a third season on May 6, 2022, which premiered on May 30, 2023.

== Episodes ==
=== Series overview ===
Season	Episodes	Originally released
1	6	April 23, 2019
2	6	July 6, 2021
3	6	May 30, 2023

=== Season 1 (2019) ===
No. overall	No. in season	Title	Directed by	Written by	Original release date
1	1	"Has This Ever Happened to You?"	Akiva Schaffer, Alice Mathias	Tim Robinson, Zach Kanin, John Solomon	April 23, 2019
An awkward exit at a job interview. A very specific legal problem. Things get ugly at the "Baby of the Year" contest. A gift receipt causes stress. Guest stars: Sam Richardson, Vanessa Bayer, Steven Yeun.
2	2	"Thanks for Thinking They Are Cool"	Akiva Schaffer, Alice Mathias	Tim Robinson, Zach Kanin, John Solomon, Jeremy Beiler	April 23, 2019
A nifty new tug-friendly T-shirt. The prank doesn't go so well. An airline passenger gets creepy. Guest star: Will Forte.
3	3	"It's the Cigars You Smoke That Are Going to Give You Cancer"	Akiva Schaffer, Alice Mathias	Tim Robinson, Zach Kanin, John Solomon	April 23, 2019
A magic show opens up a marital rift. Interesting ideas at a car design brainstorm. A fill-in organist at a funeral. A very esoteric charades player. Guest stars: Fred Willard, Cecily Strong, Tim Heidecker.
4	4	"Oh Crap, a Bunch More Bad Stuff Just Happened"	Akiva Schaffer, Alice Mathias	Tim Robinson, Zach Kanin, John Solomon	April 23, 2019
A service dog gets super friendly. Ebenezer Scrooge and Ghost of Christmas way-future. A man takes a bumper sticker way too literally. Guest star: Sam Richardson.
5	5	"I'm Wearing One of Their Belts Right Now"	Akiva Schaffer, Alice Mathias	Tim Robinson, Zach Kanin, John Solomon	April 23, 2019
A hot dog-shaped car crash. A co-worker latches on to an expression. Music studio riffing goes awry. An excuse for tardiness spirals out of control. Guest stars: Rhys Coiro, Patti Harrison.
6	6	"We Used to Watch This at My Old Work"	Akiva Schaffer, Alice Mathias	Tim Robinson, Zach Kanin, John Solomon	April 23, 2019
A solution to equine-related emasculation. A problematic game show mascot. Baby shower planning gets heated. A weird place to hold an intervention. Guest stars: Andy Samberg, Kate Berlant.

=== Season 2 (2021) ===
No. overall	No. in season	Title	Directed by	Written by	Original release date
7	1	"They said that to me at a dinner."	Alice Mathias, Zach Kanin, Akiva Schaffer, Jeffrey Max	Tim Robinson, Zach Kanin, John Solomon, Patti Harrison, Brooks Wheelan	July 6, 2021
An unplanned meeting leads to lunchtime chaos. An unusual reality show. A prank show at the mall causes an existential crisis. The "Little Buff Boys" competition. A ghost tour guest goes too far. Guest star: Sam Richardson.
8	2	"They have a cake shop there Susan where the cakes just look stunning."	Alice Mathias, Mike Diva	Tim Robinson, Zach Kanin, John Solomon	July 6, 2021
An office dispute over shirt patterns. A little lie about the ice cream store escalates quickly. A man suspects a baby is aware of his checkered past. Guest stars: Patti Harrison, Bob Odenkirk.
9	3	"You sure about that? You sure about that that's why?"	Alice Mathias, Zach Kanin, Akiva Schaffer, Zachary Johnson	Tim Robinson, Zach Kanin, John Solomon, Patti Harrison	July 6, 2021
A professor really regrets his dinner order. The Carber hot dog vacuum. "Detective Crashmore". A hat has its day in court. Guest star: Biff Wiff.
10	4	"Everyone just needs to be more in the moment."	Alice Mathias	Tim Robinson, Zach Kanin, John Solomon	July 6, 2021
An offhanded joke leaves a husband guilt-ridden. An attempt to ease tensions during a trip backfires. A pants-centric website with a specific purpose. Guest stars: Paul Walter Hauser, Conner O'Malley, Mike O'Brien, Lilan Bowden, Brody King.
11	5	"Didn't you say there was gonna be five people at this table?"	Alice Mathias, Zach Kanin	Tim Robinson, Zach Kanin, John Solomon, Patti Harrison	July 6, 2021
A novice driver in a parking lot. Defying the rules of credit card roulette. Celebrity impersonators get unruly. Date night at a cosmos-themed bar. Guest stars: John Early, Tim Heidecker, Danny Nucci, Tracey Birdsall.
12	6	"I need a wet paper towel."	Alice Mathias, Zach Kanin, Akiva Schaffer	Tim Robinson, Zach Kanin, John Solomon, Patti Harrison, Mike O'Brien	July 6, 2021
A mistaken identity at work. The new "Tammy Craps" doll. Some interesting instructional videos during a driver's ed class. An attempted ear-piercing. Guest stars: Patti Harrison, Julia Butters.

=== Season 3 (2023) ===
No. overall	No. in season	Title	Directed by	Written by	Original release date
13	1	"That Was the Earth Telling Me I'm Supposed to Do Something Great."	Alice Mathias, Andrew Fitzgerald	Tim Robinson, Zach Kanin, John Solomon, Gary Richardson, Reggie Henke	May 30, 2023
A TV pundit copes with conflict. Team building breaks down. Is Ronnie here for the right reasons? A dad tries to look tough. James asks for a ride home. Guest stars: Fred Armisen, David Purdham, Jeff Galfer, Jessica Parker Kennedy
14	2	"I Can Do Whatever I Want."	Andrew Fitzgerald, Alice Mathias, Fatal Farm, Akiva Schaffer	Tim Robinson, Zach Kanin, John Solomon, Patti Harrison, Gary Richardson, Brendan Jennings, Reggie Henke	May 30, 2023
A VR shopping spree takes a turn. Consider a high-security dog door! Ponytail problems. A bad egg at the office. Old wounds surface at a sitcom taping. Guest stars: Ayo Edebiri, Will Forte, Michelle Arthur, Kiff Scholl, Rico E. Anderson, Andy Cohen
15	3	"Cut to: We're Chatting About This at Your Bachelor Party."	Andrew Fitzgerald, Alice Mathias	Tim Robinson, Zach Kanin, John Solomon, Gary Richardson	May 30, 2023
A silent performer builds a hostile fanbase. First date jitters. A doctor monitors a patient's heart. Paying it forward. Catharsis at an office party. Guest stars: Tim Heidecker, Patti Harrison, Brandon Wardell, Mitra Jouhari, John Solomon, Aron Stevens
16	4	"So Now Every Time I'm About to Do Something I Really Want to Do, I Ask Myself, 'Wait A Minute, What Is This?'"	Alice Mathias, Andrew Fitzgerald, Fatal Farm, Zach Kanin	Tim Robinson, Zach Kanin, John Solomon, Gary Richardson	May 30, 2023
Stuart's co-workers learn about his friend group. A proposal spot does double duty. Try Gelutol! Goodbye, Ronnie. Matching shirts at a school concert. Guest stars: Sam Richardson, Beck Bennett, Timothy Davis-Reed, Jessica Parker Kennedy, Kamala Lopez, Courtney Peldon, Josh Barnett, Ryan Nemeth, Erick Redbeard, J. R. Kratos, Biff Wiff.
17	5	"Don't Just Say 'Relax', Actually Relax."	Andrew Fitzgerald, Alice Mathias, Steve Smith, Akiva Schaffer	Tim Robinson, Zach Kanin, John Solomon, Brendan Jennings	May 30, 2023
Amanda, do not say Randall is interesting. Father of the bride vs. a wedding photo booth. A new small-talk strategy at a party yields unexpected results. Guest stars: Tim Meadows, Jason Schwartzman, Tom Scharpling, Holley Fain
18	6	"When I First Thought of This You Didn't Even Have Hands Up There: You Were Just Walking Straight Up The Wall."	Alice Mathias, Andrew Fitzgerald, Fatal Farm	Tim Robinson, Zach Kanin, John Solomon, Gary Richardson, Patti Harrison	May 30, 2023
Banana breath at sensitivity training. Technical issues hit Metal Motto Search. Don Bon Darley loses his touch. What's up with Draven's Tasty Time Vids? Guest stars: Sam Richardson, Conner O'Malley, Alison Martin, Tobit Raphael Capati, Robert Klein, Preacher Lawson, Zach Kanin, Mark Saul, Robert Mukes

=== Future ===
In a 2025 interview, Schaffer said that Robinson and Kanin "have a deal, and they've been writing sketches, but they also have the HBO show, and they’ve got to finish up that season. So, I don't have a date or anything like that, but just know there are sketches that I have not read that they have written. They want to do it, and Netflix wants it, so it will happen."

== Reception ==
=== Critical response ===
On Rotten Tomatoes, the first season holds a 96% approval rating with an average rating of 7.6 out of 10, based on 25 reviews. The website's critical consensus reads, "A gloriously absurd journey into the mind of Tim Robinson, I Think You Should Leave's bazaar of surreal skits breathes new life into the world of TV sketch-comedy." On Metacritic, the first season has a 72 out of 100 rating from four reviews.

Ben Travers of IndieWire described the series as "demented" and "outlandish", but ultimately "pretty great". Fran Hoepfner of Vulture called the show "comedy perfection", writing that it is "silly, grotesque, loud, and absurd. What more could you want, really?" In a less positive review, Joel Keller wrote in Decider that the series was "more miss than hit". In April 2021, Wired contributing editor Peter Rubin wrote that he had become obsessed with I Think You Should Leave, having watched the whole first season at least 100 times. He wrote that the show's sketches tend to revolve around "a character who is gloriously, spectacularly wrong—yet refuses to budge, lest they be humiliated by copping to their own wrongness" and that thus the show "isn't just a distillation of our personal insecurities, it's a condemnation of facade. It's an antidote, in other words, to the internet itself."

On Rotten Tomatoes, the second season holds a 100% approval rating with an average rating of 8.8 out of 10, based on 30 reviews. The website's critical consensus reads, "A triumph of sketch comedy, I Think You Should Leave's sophomore season dives deeper into Tim Robinson and Zach Kanin's strange minds with manically delightful results." On Metacritic, the second season has an 87 out of 100 rating from 11 reviews.

On Rotten Tomatoes, the third season holds a 96% approval rating with an average rating of 8.1 out of 10, based on 24 reviews. The website's critical consensus reads, "Now that I Think You Should Leave's rhythms have become a recognizable pattern, some of these sketches CAN'T hit, but most of them still CAN hit – and indeed they do, with quotable hilarity." On Metacritic, the third season has an 82 out of 100 rating from eight reviews.

=== Accolades ===
Year	Award	Category	Nominee(s)	Result	Ref.
2019	Television Critics Association Awards	Outstanding Achievement in Sketch/Variety Shows	I Think You Should Leave with Tim Robinson	Nominated	
2019	Writers Guild of America Awards	Television: Best Comedy/Variety – Sketch Series	Jeremy Beiler, Zach Kanin, Tim Robinson, and John Solomon	Won	
2021	Writers Guild of America Awards	Television: Best Comedy/Variety – Sketch Series	Zach Kanin, Tim Robinson, and John Solomon	Won	
2022	Hollywood Critics Association TV Awards	Best Short Form Live-Action Series	I Think You Should Leave with Tim Robinson	Won	
2022	Television Critics Association Awards	Outstanding Achievement in Variety, Talk or Sketch	I Think You Should Leave with Tim Robinson	Won	
2022	Primetime Emmy Awards	Outstanding Short Form Comedy, Drama or Variety Series	Zach Kanin, Tim Robinson, Akiva Schaffer, Ali Bell, Alex Bach, and Alice Mathias	Nominated	
2022	Primetime Emmy Awards	Outstanding Actor in a Short Form Comedy or Drama Series	Tim Robinson	Won	
2023	Television Critics Association Awards	Outstanding Achievement in Variety, Talk or Sketch	I Think You Should Leave with Tim Robinson	Won	
2023	The Astra Creative Arts TV Awards	Best Short Form Series	I Think You Should Leave with Tim Robinson	Nominated	
2023	Primetime Creative Arts Emmy Awards	Outstanding Short Form Comedy, Drama or Variety Series	I Think You Should Leave with Tim Robinson	Won	
2023	Primetime Creative Arts Emmy Awards	Outstanding Actor in a Short Form Comedy or Drama Series	Tim Robinson	Won	
2024	Artios Awards	Outstanding Achievement in Casting – Live Television Performance, Variety, or Sketch – Comedy, Drama, or Musical	Leslie Woo, Julina Baber	Nominated	
2024	Producers Guild of America Awards	Outstanding Short-Form Program	I Think You Should Leave with Tim Robinson	Nominated	

== Live tour ==
In February 2024, it was announced that Robinson and Kanin would take the series on a national live tour, starting at the Beacon Theatre in New York in April 2024, and ending in May at the Greek Theatre in Los Angeles. The tour primarily featured unaired sketches performed live, as well as screenings of extended versions of sketches from the series. Guest performers included Sam Richardson, Seth Meyers, Lionel Boyce, Patti Harrison, and Paul Rudd.
