= TCA Award for Outstanding Achievement in Reality Programming =

Annual US television award

The TCA Award for Outstanding Achievement in Reality Programming is an award given by the Television Critics Association for reality television formats.

== Winners and nominees ==
Year	Winner	Other nominees
2010–2011 (27th)	The Amazing Race (CBS)	Anthony Bourdain: No Reservations (Travel Channel); Survivor (CBS); Top Chef: All-Stars (Bravo); The Voice (NBC)
2011–2012 (28th)	So You Think You Can Dance (Fox)	The Amazing Race (CBS); Dancing with the Stars (ABC); The Glee Project (Oxygen); The Voice (NBC)
2012–2013 (29th)	Shark Tank (ABC)	The Amazing Race (CBS); The Glee Project (Oxygen); Survivor (CBS); The Voice (NBC)
2013–2014 (30th)	RuPaul's Drag Race (Logo TV)	The Amazing Race (CBS); Shark Tank (ABC); Survivor (CBS); The Voice (NBC)
2014–2015 (31st)	The Chair (Starz)	The Amazing Race (CBS); Dancing with the Stars (ABC); RuPaul's Drag Race (Logo TV); Shark Tank (ABC)
2015–2016 (32nd)	Making a Murderer (Netflix)	The Circus: Inside the Greatest Political Show on Earth (Showtime); The Great British Baking Show (PBS); I Am Cait (E!); MasterChef Junior (Fox); Survivor: Cambodia — Second Chance (CBS)
2016–2017 (33rd)	Leah Remini: Scientology and the Aftermath (A&E)	The Circus: Inside the Greatest Political Show on Earth (Showtime); The Great British Baking Show (PBS); The Keepers (Netflix); Shark Tank (ABC); Survivor: Game Changers (CBS)
2017–2018 (34th)	Queer Eye (Netflix)	The Great British Baking Show (PBS); Nailed It! (Netflix); Project Runway (Lifetime); RuPaul's Drag Race (VH1)
2018–2019 (35th)	Queer Eye (Netflix)	The Great British Baking Show (PBS); Making It (NBC); Nailed It! (Netflix); Salt, Fat, Acid, Heat (Netflix); Tidying Up with Marie Kondo (Netflix)
2019–2020 (36th)	Cheer (Netflix)	Encore! (Disney+); Holey Moley (ABC); Making It (NBC); Top Chef: All-Stars L.A. (Bravo); We're Here (HBO)
2020–2021 (37th)	Couples Therapy (Showtime) and Deaf U (Netflix)	The Great Pottery Throw Down (HBO Max); Legendary (HBO Max); Nailed It! Double Trouble (Netflix); The Real World Homecoming: New York (Paramount+); Taste the Nation (Hulu); Top Chef: Portland (Bravo)
2021–2022 (38th)	The Amazing Race (CBS) and Legendary (HBO Max)	Cheer (Netflix); Finding Magic Mike (HBO Max); The Real Housewives of Salt Lake City (Bravo); The Real World Homecoming: New Orleans (Paramount+); Take Out with Lisa Ling (HBO Max); Top Chef: Houston (Bravo)
2022–2023 (39th)	Jury Duty (Amazon Freevee)	Couples Therapy (Showtime); The Rehearsal (HBO); RuPaul's Drag Race (MTV); Top Chef (Bravo); The Traitors (Peacock); Vanderpump Rules (Bravo); Welcome to Wrexham (FX)
2023–2024 (40th)	The Traitors (Peacock)	The Amazing Race (CBS); Conan O'Brien Must Go (HBO / Max); Jerrod Carmichael Reality Show (HBO / Max); Top Chef (Bravo); We're Here (HBO / Max); Welcome to Wrexham (FX)
2024–2025 (41st)	The Traitors (Peacock)	The Amazing Race (CBS); The Boyfriend (Netflix); Conan O'Brien Must Go (HBO Max); Couples Therapy (Showtime); Culinary Class Wars (Netflix); RuPaul's Drag Race (MTV); Survivor (CBS); Top Chef (Bravo)
2025–2026 (42nd)	The Traitors (Peacock)	Couples Therapy (Showtime/Paramount+); Finding Mr. Christmas (Hallmark); The Great British Baking Show (Netflix); Love on the Spectrum (Netflix); RuPaul's Drag Race (MTV); Survivor (CBS); Top Chef (Bravo)

== Multiple winners ==
3 wins

- The Traitors (consecutive)

2 wins

- The Amazing Race
- Queer Eye (consecutive)

== Multiple nominations ==
8 nominations

- The Amazing Race
- Top Chef

7 nominations

- Survivor

6 nominations

- RuPaul's Drag Race

5 nominations

- The Great British Baking Show

4 nominations

- Couples Therapy
- Shark Tank
- The Traitors
- The Voice

3 nominations

- Nailed It!

2 nominations

- Cheer
- The Circus: Inside the Greatest Political Show on Earth
- Conan O'Brien Must Go
- Dancing with the Stars
- The Glee Project
- Legendary
- Making It
- Queer Eye
- The Real World Homecoming
- We're Here
- Welcome to Wrexham

== Total awards by network ==
- Netflix – 5
- Peacock – 3
- CBS – 2
- A&E – 1
- ABC – 1
- Amazon Freevee – 1
- Fox – 1
- HBO/Max – 1
- Logo TV – 1
- Showtime – 1
- Starz – 1
