= Biff Wiff =

American actor (1948–2025)

- Born: October 24, 1948
- Died: February 12, 2025 (aged 76)
- Occupation: Actor
- Years active: 1986–2024

Gary Crotty (October 24, 1948 – February 12, 2025), known professionally as Biff Wiff, was an American actor, known for roles in Everything Everywhere All at Once, I Think You Should Leave, and Dave.

== Life and career ==
While a student at Wayne State University in 1975, Crotty played Snoopy in a production of You're a Good Man, Charlie Brown.

Wiff's first professional acting role was in The New Gidget in 1986.

The majority of Wiff's career was spent in smaller roles, including Roseanne, Desperate Housewives, It’s Always Sunny in Philadelphia, iCarly, and Brooklyn Nine-Nine.

Wiff's breakthrough came in 2021, when he starred as a profane Santa Claus in the second season of I Think You Should Leave. Shortly after the season debuted, he did an interview with Uproxx, the first interview of his career.

He returned for the third season of I Think You Should Leave, in the skit "Shirt Brothers."

After his 2021 I Think You Should Leave performance, Wiff was cast in several small but significant roles, including Rick in the film Everything Everywhere All at Once, Steve in the American reality hoax sitcom Jury Duty and the 2023 film Self Reliance.

In the 2023 film Self Reliance, Wiff had his role with the most screen time, playing the best friend of the main character.

In 2023, Wiff portrayed himself in the third season of the television series Dave.

He starred in two music videos for the band Drug Church, both released in 2024.

Wiff died of cancer on February 12, 2025, at the age of 76. I Think You Should Leave fans had previously donated to a fund for his cancer treatment.
