= 38th TCA Awards =

US television awards ceremony in 2022

- Date: August 6, 2022

Highlights
- Program of the Year: Abbott Elementary
- Outstanding New Program: Abbott Elementary

The 38th TCA Awards were presented on August 6, 2022. The nominees were announced by the Television Critics Association on June 16, 2022.

== Winners and nominees ==
Category	Winner	Nominees
Program of the Year	Abbott Elementary (ABC)	Better Call Saul (AMC); Hacks (HBO Max); Severance (Apple TV+); Squid Game (Netflix); Succession (HBO); The White Lotus (HBO); Yellowjackets (Showtime)
Outstanding Achievement in Comedy	Abbott Elementary (ABC)	Atlanta (FX); Barry (HBO); Ghosts (CBS); Hacks (HBO Max); Only Murders in the Building (Hulu); Reservation Dogs (FX); Ted Lasso (Apple TV+)
Outstanding Achievement in Drama	Succession (HBO)	Better Call Saul (AMC); The Good Fight (Paramount+); Pachinko (Apple TV+); Severance (Apple TV+); Squid Game (Netflix); This Is Us (NBC); Yellowjackets (Showtime)
Outstanding Achievement in Movies, Miniseries or Specials	Dopesick (Hulu)	The Dropout (Hulu); The Girl from Plainville (Hulu); Maid (Netflix); Midnight Mass (Netflix); The Staircase (HBO Max); Station Eleven (HBO Max); Under the Banner of Heaven (FX)
Outstanding New Program	Abbott Elementary (ABC)	Ghosts (CBS); Only Murders in the Building (Hulu); Pachinko (Apple TV+); Reservation Dogs (FX); Severance (Apple TV+); The White Lotus (HBO); Yellowjackets (Showtime)
Individual Achievement in Comedy	Quinta Brunson — Abbott Elementary (ABC)	Pamela Adlon — Better Things (FX); Bridget Everett — Somebody Somewhere (HBO); Bill Hader — Barry (HBO); Janelle James — Abbott Elementary (ABC); Steve Martin — Only Murders in the Building (Hulu); Jean Smart — Hacks (HBO Max); Jason Sudeikis — Ted Lasso (Apple TV+)
Individual Achievement in Drama	Mandy Moore — This Is Us (NBC)	Lee Jung-jae — Squid Game (Netflix); Michael Keaton — Dopesick (Hulu); Melanie Lynskey — Yellowjackets (Showtime); Bob Odenkirk — Better Call Saul (AMC); Margaret Qualley — Maid (Netflix); Adam Scott — Severance (Apple TV+); Rhea Seehorn — Better Call Saul (AMC); Amanda Seyfried — The Dropout (Hulu); Jeremy Strong — Succession (HBO)
Outstanding Achievement in News and Information	The Beatles: Get Back (Disney+)	Benjamin Franklin (PBS); Frontline (PBS); George Carlin's American Dream (HBO); How To with John Wilson (HBO); Prehistoric Planet (Apple TV+); 60 Minutes (CBS); The Tinder Swindler (Netflix); We Need to Talk About Cosby (Showtime)
Outstanding Achievement in Variety, Talk or Sketch	I Think You Should Leave with Tim Robinson (Netflix)	The Amber Ruffin Show (Peacock); A Black Lady Sketch Show (HBO); Last Week Tonight with John Oliver (HBO); Late Night with Seth Meyers (NBC); The Late Show with Stephen Colbert (CBS); Saturday Night Live (NBC); Ziwe (Showtime)
Outstanding Achievement in Reality	The Amazing Race (CBS) and Legendary (HBO Max)	Cheer (Netflix); Finding Magic Mike (HBO Max); The Real Housewives of Salt Lake City (Bravo); The Real World Homecoming: New Orleans (Paramount+); Take Out with Lisa Ling (HBO Max); Top Chef: Houston (Bravo)
Outstanding Achievement in Youth Programming	The Baby-Sitters Club (Netflix)	Ada Twist, Scientist (Netflix); El Deafo (Apple TV+); Mira, Royal Detective (Disney Junior); Octonauts: Above & Beyond (Netflix); Odd Squad (PBS Kids); Ridley Jones (Netflix); Sesame Street (HBO Max)
Heritage Award	I Love Lucy (CBS)	
Career Achievement Award	Ted Danson and Steve Martin	

=== Shows with multiple nominations ===
The following shows received multiple nominations:

Nominations	Recipient
5	Abbott Elementary
4	Better Call Saul
4	Severance
4	Yellowjackets
3	Hacks
3	Only Murders in the Building
3	Squid Game
3	Succession
2	Barry
2	Dopesick
2	The Dropout
2	Ghosts
2	Maid
2	Pachinko
2	Reservation Dogs
2	Ted Lasso
2	This Is Us
2	The White Lotus

=== Shows with multiple wins ===
The following shows received multiple wins:

Wins	Recipient
4	Abbott Elementary
