= 39th TCA Awards =

2023 edition of the Television Critics Association Awards

- Date: August 7, 2023
- Venue: N/A (Note: Due to the 2023 Hollywood labor disputes, the TCA canceled its in-person event; winners were announced though a press release.)

Highlights
- Program of the Year: Succession
- Outstanding New Program: The Bear

The 39th TCA Awards were presented on August 7, 2023. The nominees were announced by the Television Critics Association on June 30, 2023. Due to the 2023 Hollywood labor disputes, the TCA canceled its in-person event. Instead, the winners were announced though a press release by the TCA.

The category for Outstanding Achievement in Youth Programming was split into two categories: Outstanding Achievement in Family Programming, which recognizes shows catering to children ages 7 and older, and Outstanding Achievement in Children's Programming, for shows aimed at ages 7 and younger.

== Winners and nominees ==
Category	Winner	Nominees
Program of the Year	Succession (HBO / Max)	Abbott Elementary (ABC); Andor (Disney+); The Bear (FX); Better Call Saul (AMC); The Last of Us (HBO / Max); The Other Two (HBO / Max); Poker Face (Peacock); The White Lotus (HBO / Max)
Outstanding Achievement in Comedy	The Bear (FX)	Abbott Elementary (ABC); Barry (HBO / Max); The Other Two (HBO / Max); Poker Face (Peacock); Reservation Dogs (FX); Shrinking (Apple TV+); What We Do in the Shadows (FX)
Outstanding Achievement in Drama	Succession (HBO / Max)	Andor (Disney+); Better Call Saul (AMC); The Good Fight (Paramount+); Interview with the Vampire (AMC); The Last of Us (HBO / Max); The White Lotus (HBO / Max); Yellowjackets (Showtime)
Outstanding Achievement in Movies, Miniseries or Specials	Beef (Netflix)	Black Bird (Apple TV+); Daisy Jones & the Six (Prime Video); Fleishman Is in Trouble (FX); Mrs. Davis (Peacock); The Patient (FX); A Small Light (National Geographic); Weird: The Al Yankovic Story (The Roku Channel)
Outstanding New Program	The Bear (FX)	Andor (Disney+); Interview with the Vampire (AMC); Jury Duty (Amazon Freevee); The Last of Us (HBO / Max); Mrs. Davis (Peacock); Poker Face (Peacock); Shrinking (Apple TV+)
Individual Achievement in Comedy	Natasha Lyonne – Poker Face (Peacock)	Quinta Brunson – Abbott Elementary (ABC); Ayo Edebiri – The Bear (FX); Harrison Ford – Shrinking (Apple TV+); Bill Hader – Barry (HBO / Max); Janelle James – Abbott Elementary (ABC); James Marsden – Jury Duty (Amazon Freevee); Jeremy Allen White – The Bear (FX)
Individual Achievement in Drama	Rhea Seehorn (Note: Seehorn is the first supporting performer to prevail in the category's 27-year existence.) – Better Call Saul (AMC)	Christine Baranski – The Good Fight (Paramount+); Kieran Culkin – Succession (HBO / Max); Dominique Fishback – Swarm (Prime Video); Betty Gilpin – Mrs. Davis (Peacock); Pedro Pascal – The Last of Us (HBO / Max); Bella Ramsey – The Last of Us (HBO / Max); Sarah Snook – Succession (HBO / Max); Jeremy Strong – Succession (HBO / Max)
Outstanding Achievement in News and Information	The U.S. and the Holocaust (PBS)	30 for 30 (ESPN); The 1619 Project (Hulu); Free Chol Soo Lee (PBS); Frontline (PBS); Pepsi, Where's My Jet? (Netflix); Stolen Youth: Inside the Cult at Sarah Lawrence (Hulu); Taste the Nation with Padma Lakshmi (Hulu)
Outstanding Achievement in Variety, Talk or Sketch	I Think You Should Leave with Tim Robinson (Netflix)	The Amber Ruffin Show (Peacock); A Black Lady Sketch Show (HBO / Max); Last Week Tonight with John Oliver (HBO / Max); Late Night with Seth Meyers (NBC); The Late Show with Stephen Colbert (CBS); Saturday Night Live (NBC); Ziwe (Showtime)
Outstanding Achievement in Reality	Jury Duty (Amazon Freevee)	Couples Therapy (Showtime); The Rehearsal (HBO / Max); RuPaul's Drag Race (MTV); Top Chef (Bravo); The Traitors (Peacock); Vanderpump Rules (Bravo); Welcome to Wrexham (FX)
Outstanding Achievement in Family Programming	Ms. Marvel (Disney+)	American Born Chinese (Disney+); High School Musical: The Musical: The Series (Disney+); Jane (Apple TV+); Love, Victor (Hulu); Moon Girl and Devil Dinosaur (Disney Channel); The Mysterious Benedict Society (Disney+); Never Have I Ever (Netflix); Star Trek: Prodigy (Paramount+)
Outstanding Achievement in Children's Programming	Bluey (Disney+)	Alma's Way (PBS Kids); Daniel Tiger's Neighborhood (PBS Kids); Donkey Hodie (PBS Kids); Eva the Owlet (Apple TV+); Molly of Denali (PBS Kids); Ridley Jones (Netflix); Sesame Street (HBO / Max); Star Wars: Young Jedi Adventures (Disney Junior / Disney+)
Heritage Award	The Carol Burnett Show (CBS)	
Career Achievement Award	Mel Brooks	

=== Shows with multiple nominations ===
The following shows received multiple nominations:

Nominations	Recipient	Category	Network/Platform
5	The Bear	Comedy	FX
5	The Last of Us	Drama	HBO / Max
5	Succession	Drama	HBO / Max
4	Abbott Elementary	Comedy	ABC
4	Poker Face	Comedy	Peacock
3	Andor	Drama	Disney+
3	Better Call Saul	Drama	AMC
3	Jury Duty	Comedy/Reality	Amazon Freevee
3	Mrs. Davis	Drama/Miniseries	Peacock
3	Shrinking	Comedy	Apple TV+
2	Barry	Comedy	HBO / Max
2	The Good Fight	Drama	Paramount+
2	Interview with the Vampire	Drama	AMC
2	The Other Two	Comedy	HBO / Max
2	The White Lotus	Drama	HBO / Max

=== Shows with multiple wins ===
The following shows received multiple wins:

Wins	Recipient	Category	Network/Platform
2	The Bear	Comedy	FX
2	Succession	Drama	HBO / Max
