= Self Reliance (film) =

2023 film by Jake Johnson

- Theatrical release poster
- Directed by: Jake Johnson
- Written by: Jake Johnson
- Produced by: Jake Johnson; Ali Bell; Joe Hardesty
- Starring: Jake Johnson; Anna Kendrick; Natalie Morales; Andy Samberg; Mary Holland; Emily Hampshire; Christopher Lloyd
- Cinematography: Adam Silver
- Edited by: Ryan Brown
- Music by: Dan Romer
- Production companies: MRC; Clown Show; Lonely Island Classics; Walcott Productions
- Distributed by: Neon; Hulu
- Release dates: March 11, 2023 (SXSW); January 3, 2024 (United States)
- Running time: 87 minutes
- Country: United States
- Language: English

Self Reliance is a 2023 American comedy thriller film written, directed by and starring Jake Johnson in his feature length directorial debut. It also stars Anna Kendrick, Natalie Morales, Mary Holland, Emily Hampshire, and Christopher Lloyd. In the film, Tommy Walcott (Johnson) is given the opportunity to participate in a life or death reality game show to win one million dollars.

The film premiered at South by Southwest (SXSW) on March 11, 2023, and was released theatrically in the United States in a one-night special engagement on January 3, 2024, by Neon, followed by a streaming release on Hulu on January 12, 2024. It received generally positive reviews from critics.

== Plot ==
One day, actor Andy Samberg invites the disaffected Tommy Walcott into a limo in LA. There, he offers him a role in a 30-day adventure. Tommy agrees, so meets two hosts in a warehouse who explain the life or death reality game show hosted on the dark web.

Telling his family, Tommy's mother and roommate Laurie and sisters Amy and Mary are incredulous. They believe it is a ruse to avoid closure with his former life-long girlfriend, Theresa. Tommy seeks someone on Craigslist to accompany him for the month.

On the night of day 5, Tommy crashes at Amy and her boyfriend Malcolm's. Upon awakening, he panics when spotting a rifle-wielding hunter figure outside and not seeing Malcolm. He bursts into Malcolm's bathroom to not die. Startled, Tommy gets expulsed in the middle of the night, forcing him to hire homeless stranger James to be his shadow.

Tommy and James have an uneventful week. However, on the night of day 13, he narrowly escapes a Michael Jackson lookalike attack. The next day, Tommy and James meet Maddy from Craigslist, who says she has 15 days remaining. He proposes they stick together to avoid dying.

The two quickly bond. However that night, Tommy is awakened in Maddy's bed by a production assistant ninja troupe. They warn him he is not so safe. Tommy convinces Maddy to move with him to a local motel. There, they are threatened by a Mario hunter, the supposed manager and plumber.

On day 19, another Craigslist message claims to have important information about the game, however Maddy discourages Tommy from responding. Charlie explains the game show is billed as a comedy called DOG ("Delusions of Grandeur") and they are the punchline. Unsettled, Maddy abruptly leaves without Tommy.

Frustrated, Tommy returns to Amy and Malcolm’s, where he loudly rebukes the show's viewers, threatening to murder Andy Samberg if Maddy gets hurt. That night, he is again awakened and led to a limo. There, Tommy surprisingly finds Dennis, his estranged father of thirty years.

Wayne Brady told Dennis that Maddy is unhurt. After apologizing for abandoning him and Laurie, he then encourages Tommy to win her back. So, the next morning, he and James go to Maddy's, who confesses she lied about being part of the game out of boredom, believing it was a role play dating scenario.

Receiving his mother’s cryptic text urging him home, Tommy runs. He is attacked by a Ellen DeGeneres lookalike midway, losing a tooth but escaping. James catches up, and is by his side when he arrives home to his family’s intervention.

Tommy bolts with James to hide at a homeless encampment. There, he promises to get him a place with some of the prize money. James reveals his name is actually Walter, which Tommy had got wrong when they met.

On day 27, Tommy wakes alone, escapes and spends the next few nights at another encampment, growing increasingly unkempt. On night 29, the production assistants wake Tommy. They explain they relocated Walter nearby, so the finale is more exciting.

Tommy is asked to leave the encampment and await a limo. While waiting, he escapes the cowboy hunter, who explains the whole game was tailored for him, drawing characters from his interests and past. In the limo, Andy Samberg offers Tommy to forgo the cash to return home safely, but Tommy refuses.

Back at the original warehouse, Tommy is chased by a sumo wrestler, a comedian Sinbad, and a samurai. Again at the room where it all started, it is empty. Suddenly, stage lights flood the area, the hosts enter, followed by many production assistants and hunters. All congratulate him for being the game’s first winner.

Tommy returns home vindicated, but reveals the prize money is being delivered as 250 monthly (i.e. 21 years) installments of 4,000 dollars paid in Danish krone. He invites Walter to room with him. Before returning home, Tommy seeks Maddy and the screen cuts out as he nervously knocks on her door.

== Cast ==
- Jake Johnson as Tommy
- Anna Kendrick as Maddy
- Natalie Morales as Theresa
- Andy Samberg as himself
- Mary Holland as Amy
- Emily Hampshire as Mary
- Nancy Lenehan as Laurie
- Daryl J. Johnson as Malcolm
- Miriam Flynn as Becky Ann
- Boban Marjanović as 7 Foot Man
- Biff Wiff as James/Walter
- Eduardo Franco as P.A. Ninja
- Jeff Kober as Cowboy
- Christopher Lloyd as Dennis Walcott
- Wayne Brady as himself
- GaTa as Charlie
- Eric Edelstein as Roy
- Ilia Volok as Mario
- Karen Maruyama as Lindsey

== Production ==
The film was produced by MRC Film. Johnson had first pitched the idea to Netflix in 2017. His original title for it was DOG ("delusions of grandeur"), and he likened it to "Jacob's Ladder meets Bottle Rocket". He wrote the screenplay during the COVID-19 pandemic. Filming took place over 19 days in Los Angeles. The film was scored by Dan Romer.

== Release ==
The film premiered at the 2023 South by Southwest Film & TV Festival in Austin, Texas on March 11, 2023. In June 2023, Hulu acquired the U.S. distribution rights to the film in a deal with co-financier MRC and Paramount Global Content Distribution, setting it for a streaming release on September 8, 2023. In August 2023, it was reported that the release had been pushed back to that November. The film was released by Hulu on January 12, 2024. Neon partnered with AMC Theatres for a limited theatrical release of the film preceding its streaming release. The film was screened for a single night on January 3, 2024 across 225 theatres in the United States and also featured a behind-the-scenes discussion between Johnson and Lamorne Morris.

== Reception ==
On the review aggregator website Rotten Tomatoes, 73% of 62 critics' reviews are positive, with an average rating of 6.2/10. The website's consensus reads: "Debuting director Jake Johnson acquits himself admirably with Self Reliance, a unique comedy-thriller hybrid that does a generally effective job of balancing silly and sincere." Metacritic, which uses a weighted average, assigned the film a score of 59 out of 100, based on 13 critics, indicating "mixed or average" reviews.

Peter Debruge of Variety described the film as a "silly and frequently surprising why-we-need-people parable".
