= The Amber Ruffin Show =

American late-night talk show

- Genre: Late-night talk show
- Created by: Amber Ruffin
- Presented by: Amber Ruffin
- Starring: Amber Ruffin; Tarik Davis
- Country of origin: United States
- Original language: English
- No. of seasons: 3
- No. of episodes: 36

Production
- Executive producers: Jenny Hagel; Amber Ruffin; Seth Meyers; Mike Shoemaker
- Producers: Jason Carden; Jennifer Sochko; Zoie Mancino; Justin McGriff
- Production locations: Studio 8G, NBC Studios; Midtown Manhattan
- Running time: 30 minutes
- Production companies: Sethmaker Shoemeyers Productions; Universal Television

Original release
- Network: Peacock
- Release: September 25, 2020 – December 16, 2022

Related
- Late Night with Seth Meyers

The Amber Ruffin Show is an American comedy late-night talk show. Produced by Universal Television and Sethmaker Shoemeyers Productions and starring Amber Ruffin, it features a mix of sketches and monologues. The series was ordered for nine half-hour episodes and premiered on NBCUniversal's video-streaming service Peacock on September 25, 2020. Peacock ordered an additional 10 episodes in December 2020, and the series was promoted with a brief run on the NBC broadcast network in February and March 2021. The third season premiered on September 30, 2022. In 2023, it was announced the program would only return on occasion as specials but these were never ordered.

The first season received nominations from the Primetime Emmy Awards, TCA Awards, and the Critics' Choice Television Awards, among others. The second season which premiered on October 8, 2021, received nominations from the TCA Awards, GLAAD Media Awards and the Critics' Choice Television Awards, among others.

== Format ==
The show features comedic monologues and sketches with Ruffin and sidekick Tarik Davis. The jokes cover topics including current events and politics.

Ruffin's recurring segment "How Did We Get Here" provides an in-depth look at the intersection of race, gender, and politics in America and abroad, including segments on police brutality, Meghan Markle, violence against Asian Americans, white supremacy, the filibuster, and the January 6, 2021 U.S. Capitol riot.

== Production ==
=== Development ===
On September 19, 2019, it was announced that Amber Ruffin would host her own show on Peacock, the new streaming service from NBCUniversal. Peacock ordered nine episodes of the limited run series which could receive a full order. The running time is 30 minutes.

The Amber Ruffin Show is produced by Universal Television and Sethmaker Shoemeyers Productions, and the executive producers are Jenny Hagel, Amber Ruffin, Seth Meyers, and Mike Shoemaker.

The show premiered on September 25, 2020, on Peacock. As of its premiere, Ruffin was the only Black woman on television in the United States headlining a late night talk show. On December 10, 2020, it was announced Peacock had ordered an additional ten episodes of the series. On September 14, 2021, Peacock renewed the series for a second season, which premiered on October 8, 2021.

=== Writers ===
Ruffin co-writes the show. She retains her job as a writer on Late Night with Seth Meyers. Hagel is the head writer and additional writers are Demi Adejuyigbe, Shantira Jackson, and Dewayne Perkins. Patrick Rowland, Nnamdi Ngwe, Corin Wells, Ashley Nicole Black, Ian Morgan, Mike Poole, Zackery Stephens, Erica Buddington, Jill Twiss, and Michael Harriot joined the writing staff in 2021.

=== Set ===
The show uses the same studio, Studio 8G, as Late Night with Seth Meyers, though a more intimate set is placed in front of the regular Late Night set, and the show tapes on Fridays for same-day airing when Late Night is usually dark. A running gag at the end of each week's Thursday/early Friday morning Late Night is Ruffin comically intimidating Meyers off his set so her show can set up and record.

== Broadcast ==
On February 19, 2021, NBC announced that The Amber Ruffin Show would air on the NBC broadcast network at 1:30 a.m. ET/PT for two consecutive Friday nights (early Saturday mornings), February 26 and March 5, replacing A Little Late with Lilly Singh (which typically aired reruns on Friday nights) in its timeslot.

== Reception ==
The Amber Ruffin Show received critical acclaim. The first season holds an approval rating of 100% on Rotten Tomatoes based on 8 critic reviews. Garrett Martin of Paste wrote in a review, "if you’ve seen her on Late Night with Seth Meyers, you know how charming and disarming Ruffin can be...For a first episode, last Friday’s debut was remarkably confident and consistent, which is a great sign for the show’s future." Of Ruffin's persona as a host Melanie McFarland wrote for Salon, "In attempting to describe her specific appeal, one struggles to write around terms that are typically disempowering to women like "adorable" or "spunky" or any other descriptor that would rightly merit a slap in the face. Ruffin's plugs into them, though. They're her power sources." Kathryn VanArendonk of Vulture described the show warmly, writing, "Even from the first episodes on Peacock, Ruffin’s host persona was already in place, in all its iterations: her sweet, slightly sly baseline; the heightened camp of her goofiest sketches; the pivot toward directness and exasperation in her political segments. She delights in toggling between the broad and the specific."

The show was nominated for Outstanding Writing for a Variety Series at the 73rd Primetime Emmy Awards.

Award nominations for The Amber Ruffin Show
Year	Award	Category	Nominee(s)	Result
2021	Primetime Emmy Awards	Outstanding Writing for a Variety Series	Jenny Hagel, Demi Adejuyigbe, Ashley Nicole Black, Michael Harriot, Shantira Jackson, Ian Morgan, Dewayne Perkins, and Amber Ruffin	Nominated
2021	Television Critics Association Awards	Outstanding Achievement in Variety, Talk or Sketch	The Amber Ruffin Show	Nominated
2021	Writers Guild of America Awards	Comedy/Variety Sketch Series	Jenny Hagel, Demi Adejuyigbe, Shantira Jackson, Dewayne Perkins, Amber Ruffin, and John Lutz	Nominated
2022	Black Reel Awards for Television	Outstanding Variety, Talk or Sketch – Series or Special	Jason Carden, Jen Sochko, Zoie Mancino. Amber Ruffin, and Jenny Hagel	Nominated
2022	Critics' Choice Television Awards	Best Talk Show	The Amber Ruffin Show	Nominated
2022	Dorian Awards	Best Current Affairs Program	The Amber Ruffin Show	Nominated
2022	GLAAD Media Awards	Outstanding Variety or Talk Show Episode	The Amber Ruffin Show (for "Bisexual Superman Is Not Ruining Your Childhood, B*tch Please")	Nominated
2022	Hollywood Critics Association TV Awards	Best Streaming Variety Sketch Series, Talk Series, or Special	The Amber Ruffin Show	Nominated
2022	NAACP Image Awards	Outstanding Host in a Reality, Game Show or Variety (Series or Special)	Amber Ruffin	Nominated
2022	Television Critics Association Awards	Outstanding Achievement in Variety, Talk or Sketch	The Amber Ruffin Show	Nominated
