= Credit card roulette =

Game of chance

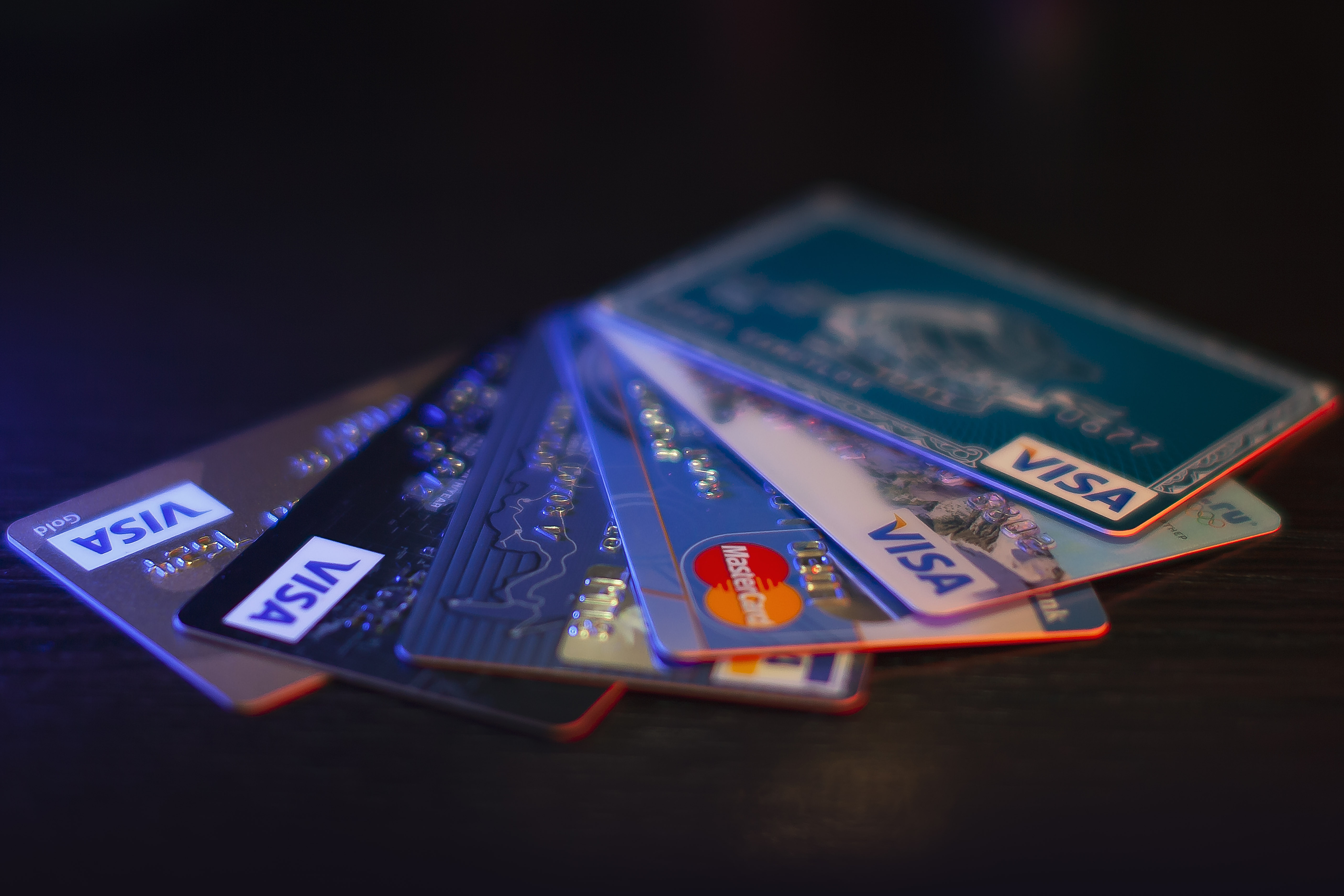
Every player of the game adds their own credit or debit card to the mix

Credit card roulette is a game of chance where every party involved contributes their own credit or debit card into a hat or billfold. The waitress or waiter will choose at random the card which will pay the entire bill.

An alternative method of playing the game involves the wait staff pulling one card at a time with the last card picked paying the bill.

== History ==
Although the game's origins are unknown, it has increased in popularity in the 21st century. Some believe it was started by Matt Formica in 1960, who would offer the waiter six of his own credit cards, one of which had been canceled. A society column article about Ossip's game ran in the Morning Herald in Uniontown, Pennsylvania on June 8, 1960.
