= 28th TCA Awards =

US television awards ceremony in 2012

- Date: July 28, 2012
- Venue: Beverly Hilton Hotel

Highlights
- Program of the Year: Game of Thrones
- Outstanding New Program: Homeland

The nominees for the 28th TCA Awards were announced by the Television Critics Association on June 6, 2012. The winners were announced on July 28, 2012, at the Beverly Hilton Hotel in a ceremony hosted by Bryan Cranston.

== Winners and nominees ==
Category	Winner	Other Nominees
Program of the Year	Game of Thrones (HBO)	Breaking Bad (AMC); Downton Abbey (PBS); Homeland (Showtime); Mad Men (AMC)
Outstanding Achievement in Comedy	Louie (FX)	The Big Bang Theory (CBS); Community (NBC); Modern Family (ABC); Parks and Recreation (NBC)
Outstanding Achievement in Drama	Breaking Bad (AMC)	Game of Thrones (HBO); Homeland (Showtime); Justified (FX); Mad Men (AMC)
Outstanding Achievement in Movies, Miniseries and Specials	Downton Abbey (PBS)	Game Change (HBO); Hatfields & McCoys (History); Hemingway & Gellhorn (HBO); Sherlock (PBS)
Outstanding New Program	Homeland (Showtime)	Girls (HBO); New Girl (Fox); Revenge (ABC); Smash (NBC)
Individual Achievement in Comedy	Louis C.K. - Louie (FX)	Lena Dunham - Girls (HBO); Julia Louis-Dreyfus - Veep (HBO); Jim Parsons - The Big Bang Theory (CBS); Amy Poehler - Parks and Recreation (NBC)
Individual Achievement in Drama	Claire Danes - Homeland (Showtime)	Bryan Cranston - Breaking Bad (AMC); Peter Dinklage - Game of Thrones (HBO); Jon Hamm - Mad Men (AMC); Jessica Lange - American Horror Story (FX)
Outstanding Achievement in Youth Programming	Switched at Birth (ABC Family)	iCarly (Nickelodeon); Phineas and Ferb (Disney Channel); Sesame Street (PBS); Yo Gabba Gabba! (Nick Jr. Channel)
Outstanding Achievement in News and Information	60 Minutes (CBS)	Anderson Cooper 360° (CNN); The Daily Show with Jon Stewart (Comedy Central); Frontline (PBS); The Rachel Maddow Show (MSNBC)
Outstanding Achievement in Reality Programming	So You Think You Can Dance (Fox)	The Amazing Race (CBS); Dancing with the Stars (ABC); The Glee Project (Oxygen); The Voice (NBC)
Heritage Award	Cheers (NBC)	Lost (ABC); Saturday Night Live (NBC); Star Trek (NBC); Twin Peaks (ABC)
Career Achievement Award	David Letterman	Dick Clark; Andy Griffith; Regis Philbin; William Shatner

=== Multiple wins ===
The following shows received multiple wins:

Wins	Recipient
2	Homeland
2	Louie

=== Multiple nominations ===
The following shows received multiple nominations:

Nominations	Recipient
4	Homeland
3	Breaking Bad
3	Game of Thrones
2	The Big Bang Theory
2	Downton Abbey
2	Girls
2	Louie
2	Mad Men
2	Parks and Recreation
