= 42nd TCA Awards =

2026 television award ceremony

- Date: August 20, 2026

Highlights
- Program of the Year: Heated Rivalry
- Outstanding New Program: Widow's Bay

The winners for the 42nd TCA Awards were announced on August 20, 2026. The nominees were announced by the Television Critics Association on June 12, 2026.

This year, two new categories were introduced: Outstanding Achievement in Animation and Outstanding International Series.

== Winners and Nominees ==
Category	Winner	Nominees
Program of the Year	Heated Rivalry (Crave/HBO Max)	The Comeback (HBO); Hacks (HBO Max); Industry (HBO); The Late Show with Stephen Colbert (CBS); The Pitt (HBO Max); Pluribus (Apple TV); Shrinking (Apple TV); Widow's Bay (Apple TV)
Outstanding Achievement in Comedy	Widow's Bay (Apple TV)	Abbott Elementary (ABC); The Comeback (HBO); The Fall and Rise of Reggie Dinkins (NBC); Hacks (HBO Max); The Lowdown (FX); Margo's Got Money Troubles (Apple TV); Shrinking (Apple TV)
Outstanding Achievement in Drama	The Pitt (HBO Max)	The Gilded Age (HBO); Heated Rivalry (Crave/HBO Max); Industry (HBO); A Knight of the Seven Kingdoms (HBO); Paradise (Hulu); Pluribus (Apple TV); Task (HBO)
Outstanding Achievement in Movies, Miniseries or Specials	Death by Lightning (Netflix)	All Her Fault (Peacock); The Beast in Me (Netflix); Beef (Netflix); DTF St. Louis (HBO Max); Half Man (HBO Max); Lord of the Flies (Netflix); Love Story: John F. Kennedy Jr. and Carolyn Bessette (FX)
Outstanding New Program	Widow's Bay (Apple TV)	Alien: Earth (FX); The Fall and Rise of Reggie Dinkins (NBC); Heated Rivalry (Crave/HBO Max); A Knight of the Seven Kingdoms (HBO); The Lowdown (FX); Margo's Got Money Troubles (Apple TV); Pluribus (Apple TV)
Individual Achievement in Comedy	Kate O'Flynn – Widow's Bay (Apple TV)	Hannah Einbinder – Hacks (HBO Max); Elle Fanning – Margo's Got Money Troubles (Apple TV); Harrison Ford – Shrinking (Apple TV); Lisa Kudrow – The Comeback (HBO); Matthew Rhys – Widow's Bay (Apple TV); Jean Smart – Hacks (HBO Max); Tim Robinson – The Chair Company (HBO)
Individual Achievement in Drama	Rhea Seehorn – Pluribus (Apple TV+)	Marisa Abela – Industry (HBO); Sterling K. Brown – Paradise (Hulu); David Harbour – DTF St. Louis (HBO Max); Katherine LaNasa – The Pitt (HBO Max); Ken Leung – Industry (HBO); Myha'la – Industry (HBO); Connor Storrie – Heated Rivalry (Crave/HBO Max); Hudson Williams – Heated Rivalry (Crave/HBO Max); Noah Wyle – The Pitt (HBO Max)
Outstanding Achievement in News and Information	The American Revolution (PBS)	60 Minutes (CBS); CBS This Morning (CBS); Disneyland Handcrafted (Disney+); Frontline (PBS); Have I Got News For You (CNN); Marty, Life Is Short (Netflix); Mr. Scorsese (Apple TV)
Outstanding Achievement in Variety, Talk or Sketch	The Late Show with Stephen Colbert (CBS)	The Daily Show (Comedy Central); Jimmy Kimmel Live! (ABC); Late Night with Seth Meyers (NBC); Last Week Tonight with John Oliver (HBO); The Muppet Show: Sabrina Carpenter (Disney+); Saturday Night Live (NBC)
Outstanding Achievement in Reality	The Traitors (Peacock)	Couples Therapy (Showtime/Paramount+); Finding Mr. Christmas (Hallmark Channel); The Great British Baking Show (Netflix); Love on the Spectrum (Netflix); RuPaul's Drag Race (MTV); Survivor (CBS); Top Chef (Bravo)
Outstanding Achievement in Family Programming	Percy Jackson and the Olympians (Disney+/Hulu)	Disney Twisted-Wonderland: The Animation (Disney+); Electric Bloom (Disney+/Disney Channel); Phineas and Ferb (Disney+/Disney Channel); Stranger Things: Tales from '85 (Netflix); Vampirina: Teenage Vampire (Disney+/Disney Channel); Wizards Beyond Waverly Place (Disney+/Disney Channel); WondLa (Apple TV)
Outstanding Achievement in Children's Programming	Snoopy Presents: A Summer Musical (Apple TV)	Carl the Collector (PBS Kids); The First Snow of Fraggle Rock (Apple TV); Mickey Mouse Clubhouse+ (Disney+/Disney Jr.); Phoebe & Jay (PBS Kids); Sofia the First: Royal Magic (Disney+/Disney Jr.); Weather Hunters (PBS Kids); The Wonderfully Weird World of Gumball (Hulu)
Outstanding Achievement in Animation	Long Story Short (Netflix)	Bob's Burgers (Fox); Haunted Hotel (Netflix); Invincible (Prime Video); King of the Hill (Hulu); The Simpsons (Fox); South Park (Comedy Central); Star Wars: Maul – Shadow Lord (Disney+); Women Wearing Shoulder Pads (Adult Swim)
Outstanding International Series	Squid Game (Netflix) (South Korea)	The Boyfriend (Netflix) (Japan); Crime Scene Zero (Netflix) (South Korea); Drops of God (Apple TV) (France) / (Japan) / (United States); The House of the Spirits (Prime Video) (Chile); Last Samurai Standing (Netflix) (Japan)
Heritage Award	In Living Color	
Career Achievement Award	Stephen Colbert	

=== Series with multiple nominations ===
The following series received multiple nominations:

Nominations	Recipient	Category	Network/Platform
5	Heated Rivalry	Drama	Crave/HBO Max
5	Industry	Drama	HBO
5	Widow's Bay	Comedy	Apple TV
4	Hacks	Comedy	HBO Max
4	The Pitt	Drama	HBO Max
4	Pluribus	Drama	Apple TV
3	The Comeback	Comedy	HBO
3	Margo's Got Money Troubles	Comedy	Apple TV
3	Shrinking	Comedy	Apple TV
2	DTF St. Louis	Drama	HBO Max
2	The Fall and Rise of Reggie Dinkins	Comedy	NBC
2	A Knight of the Seven Kingdoms	Drama	HBO
2	The Late Show with Stephen Colbert	Variety	CBS
2	The Lowdown	Comedy	FX
2	Paradise	Drama	Hulu

=== Series with multiple wins ===
The following series received multiple wins:

Wins	Recipient	Category	Network/Platform
3	Widow's Bay	Comedy	Apple TV
