= 37th TCA Awards =

US television awards ceremony in 2021

- Date: September 15, 2021
- Venue: N/A (Note: Due to the COVID-19 pandemic, the winners were announced in an online event.)

Highlights
- Program of the Year: Ted Lasso
- Outstanding New Program: Ted Lasso

The 37th TCA Awards were announced on September 15, 2021, via an online event due to the COVID-19 pandemic. The nominees were announced by the Television Critics Association on July 15, 2021. The categories were expanded this year to include eight nominees each (with the exception of Outstanding Achievement in Variety, Talk or Sketch, which includes nine).

== Winners and nominees ==
Category	Winner	Nominees
Program of the Year	Ted Lasso (Apple TV+)	Bridgerton (Netflix); Hacks (HBO Max); I May Destroy You (HBO); Mare of Easttown (HBO); The Queen's Gambit (Netflix); The Underground Railroad (Amazon Prime Video); WandaVision (Disney+)
Outstanding Achievement in Comedy	Ted Lasso (Apple TV+)	The Flight Attendant (HBO Max); Girls5eva (Peacock); Hacks (HBO Max); Mythic Quest (Apple TV+); PEN15 (Hulu); Superstore (NBC); Zoey's Extraordinary Playlist (NBC)
Outstanding Achievement in Drama	The Crown (Netflix)	Bridgerton (Netflix); For All Mankind (Apple TV+); The Handmaid's Tale (Hulu); Lovecraft Country (HBO); The Mandalorian (Disney+); Pose (FX); P-Valley (Starz)
Outstanding Achievement in Movies, Miniseries or Specials	Mare of Easttown (HBO)	Bo Burnham: Inside (Netflix); The Good Lord Bird (Showtime); I May Destroy You (HBO); It's a Sin (HBO Max); The Queen's Gambit (Netflix); The Underground Railroad (Amazon Prime Video); WandaVision (Disney+)
Outstanding New Program	Ted Lasso (Apple TV+)	Bridgerton (Netflix); The Flight Attendant (HBO Max); Hacks (HBO Max); I May Destroy You (HBO); Mare of Easttown (HBO); P-Valley (Starz); WandaVision (Disney+)
Individual Achievement in Comedy	Jean Smart — Hacks (HBO Max)	Bo Burnham — Bo Burnham: Inside (Netflix); Kaley Cuoco — The Flight Attendant (HBO Max); Maya Erskine — PEN15 (Hulu); Renée Elise Goldsberry — Girls5eva (Peacock); Charlotte Nicdao — Mythic Quest (Apple TV+); Jason Sudeikis — Ted Lasso (Apple TV+); Hannah Waddingham — Ted Lasso (Apple TV+)
Individual Achievement in Drama	Michaela Coel — I May Destroy You (HBO)	Ethan Hawke — The Good Lord Bird (Showtime); Thuso Mbedu — The Underground Railroad (Amazon Prime Video); Elizabeth Olsen — WandaVision (Disney+); Michaela Jaé Rodriguez — Pose (FX); Omar Sy — Lupin (Netflix); Anya Taylor-Joy — The Queen's Gambit (Netflix); Kate Winslet — Mare of Easttown (HBO)
Outstanding Achievement in News and Information	Framing Britney Spears (FX/FX on Hulu)	Allen v. Farrow (HBO); City So Real (National Geographic); Frontline (PBS); I'll Be Gone in the Dark (HBO); Oprah with Meghan and Harry: A CBS Primetime Special (CBS); The Rachel Maddow Show (MSNBC); 60 Minutes (CBS)
Outstanding Achievement in Variety, Talk or Sketch	Last Week Tonight with John Oliver (HBO)	The Amber Ruffin Show (Peacock); A Black Lady Sketch Show (HBO); The Daily Show with Trevor Noah (Comedy Central); Desus & Mero (Showtime); Late Night with Seth Meyers (NBC); The Late Show with Stephen Colbert (CBS); Saturday Night Live (NBC); Ziwe (Showtime)
Outstanding Achievement in Reality	Couples Therapy (Showtime) TIE; Deaf U (Netflix) TIE	The Great Pottery Throw Down (HBO Max); Legendary (HBO Max); Nailed It! Double Trouble (Netflix); The Real World Homecoming: New York (Paramount+); Taste the Nation (Hulu); Top Chef: Portland (Bravo)
Outstanding Achievement in Youth Programming	The Baby-Sitters Club (Netflix)	Bluey (Disney Junior); Donkey Hodie (PBS Kids); Emily's Wonder Lab (Netflix); Odd Squad (PBS Kids); Sesame Street (HBO); Waffles + Mochi (Netflix); Xavier Riddle and the Secret Museum (PBS Kids)
Heritage Award	The Golden Girls (NBC)	
Career Achievement Award	Jean Smart	

=== Shows with multiple nominations ===
The following shows received multiple nominations:

Nominations	Recipient
5	Ted Lasso
4	Hacks
4	I May Destroy You
4	Mare of Easttown
4	WandaVision
3	Bridgerton
3	The Flight Attendant
3	The Queen's Gambit
3	The Underground Railroad
2	Bo Burnham: Inside
2	Girls5eva
2	The Good Lord Bird
2	Mythic Quest
2	PEN15
2	Pose
2	P-Valley

=== Shows with multiple wins ===
The following show received multiple wins:

Wins	Recipient
3	Ted Lasso
