= TCA Award for Outstanding Achievement in Sketch/Variety Shows =

Annual US television award

The TCA Award for Outstanding Achievement in Sketch/Variety Shows is an award given by the Television Critics Association. The category was introduced in 2018, diverging from the Outstanding Achievement in News and Information category to honor variety talk and sketch shows.

== Winners and nominees ==
Year	Winner	Other Nominees
2017–2018 (34th)	Last Week Tonight with John Oliver (HBO)	Full Frontal with Samantha Bee (TBS); Jimmy Kimmel Live! (ABC); Late Night with Seth Meyers (NBC); The Late Show with Stephen Colbert (CBS); Saturday Night Live (NBC)
2018–2019 (35th)	Last Week Tonight with John Oliver (HBO)	Desus & Mero (Showtime); Full Frontal with Samantha Bee (TBS); I Think You Should Leave with Tim Robinson (Netflix); Late Night with Seth Meyers (NBC); The Late Show with Stephen Colbert (CBS)
2019–2020 (36th)	A Black Lady Sketch Show (HBO)	The Daily Show with Trevor Noah (Comedy Central); Full Frontal with Samantha Bee (TBS); Last Week Tonight with John Oliver (HBO); Late Night with Seth Meyers (NBC); Saturday Night Live (NBC)
2020–2021 (37th)	Last Week Tonight with John Oliver (HBO)	The Amber Ruffin Show (Peacock); A Black Lady Sketch Show (HBO); The Daily Show with Trevor Noah (Comedy Central); Desus & Mero (Showtime); Late Night with Seth Meyers (NBC); The Late Show with Stephen Colbert (CBS); Saturday Night Live (NBC); Ziwe (Showtime)
2021–2022 (38th)	I Think You Should Leave with Tim Robinson (Netflix)	The Amber Ruffin Show (Peacock); A Black Lady Sketch Show (HBO); Last Week Tonight with John Oliver (HBO); Late Night with Seth Meyers (NBC); The Late Show with Stephen Colbert (CBS); Saturday Night Live (NBC); Ziwe (Showtime)
2022–2023 (39th)	I Think You Should Leave with Tim Robinson (Netflix)	The Amber Ruffin Show (Peacock); A Black Lady Sketch Show (HBO); Last Week Tonight with John Oliver (HBO); Late Night with Seth Meyers (NBC); The Late Show with Stephen Colbert (CBS); Saturday Night Live (NBC); Ziwe (Showtime)
2023–2024 (40th)	John Mulaney Presents: Everybody's in LA (Netflix)	The Daily Show (Comedy Central); Jimmy Kimmel Live! (ABC); Last Week Tonight with John Oliver (HBO / Max); Late Night with Seth Meyers (NBC); Saturday Night Live (NBC)
2024–2025 (41st)	SNL50: The Anniversary Special (NBC)	The Daily Show (Comedy Central); Everybody's Live with John Mulaney (Netflix); Hot Ones (YouTube); Jimmy Kimmel Live! (ABC); Late Night with Seth Meyers (NBC); The Late Show with Stephen Colbert (CBS); Last Week Tonight with John Oliver (HBO); Saturday Night Live (NBC)
2025–2026 (42nd)	The Late Show with Stephen Colbert (CBS)	The Daily Show (Comedy Central); Jimmy Kimmel Live! (ABC); Late Night with Seth Meyers (NBC); Last Week Tonight with John Oliver (HBO); The Muppet Show: Sabrina Carpenter (Disney+); Saturday Night Live (NBC)

== Programs with multiple wins ==
3 wins

- Last Week Tonight with John Oliver

2 wins

- I Think You Should Leave with Tim Robinson

== Multiple nominees ==
9 nominations

- Last Week Tonight with John Oliver
- Late Night with Seth Meyers

8 nominations

- Saturday Night Live

7 nominations

- The Late Show with Stephen Colbert

5 nominations

- The Daily Show

4 nominations

- A Black Lady Sketch Show
- Jimmy Kimmel Live!

3 nominations

- The Amber Ruffin Show
- Full Frontal with Samantha Bee
- I Think You Should Leave with Tim Robinson
- Ziwe

2 nominations

- Desus & Mero

== Total awards by network ==
- HBO/Max – 4
- Netflix – 3
- NBC – 1
- CBS – 1
