= 35th TCA Awards =

US television awards ceremony in 2019

- Date: August 3, 2019
- Venue: The Beverly Hilton, Beverly Hills, California
- Hosted by: Desus and Mero

Highlights
- Program of the Year: Fleabag
- Outstanding New Program: Russian Doll

The 35th TCA Awards were held on August 3, 2019, in a ceremony hosted by Desus and Mero at The Beverly Hilton in Beverly Hills, California. The nominees were announced by the Television Critics Association on June 19, 2019.

== Winners and nominees ==
Category	Winner	Nominees
Program of the Year	Fleabag (Amazon)	Chernobyl (HBO); Game of Thrones (HBO); Pose (FX); Russian Doll (Netflix); When They See Us (Netflix)
Outstanding Achievement in Comedy	Fleabag (Amazon)	Barry (HBO); The Good Place (NBC); The Marvelous Mrs. Maisel (Amazon); Russian Doll (Netflix); Schitt's Creek (Pop TV); Veep (HBO)
Outstanding Achievement in Drama	Better Call Saul (AMC)	The Good Fight (CBS All Access); Homecoming (Amazon); Killing Eve (BBC America); Pose (FX); Succession (HBO)
Outstanding Achievement in Movies, Miniseries and Specials	Chernobyl (HBO)	Deadwood: The Movie (HBO); Escape at Dannemora (Showtime); Fosse/Verdon (FX); Sharp Objects (HBO); When They See Us (Netflix)
Outstanding New Program	Russian Doll (Netflix)	Dead to Me (Netflix); The Other Two (Comedy Central); Pose (FX); Succession (HBO); What We Do in the Shadows (FX)
Individual Achievement in Comedy	Phoebe Waller-Bridge – Fleabag (Amazon)	Pamela Adlon – Better Things (FX); Bill Hader – Barry (HBO); Julia Louis-Dreyfus – Veep (HBO); Natasha Lyonne – Russian Doll (Netflix); Catherine O'Hara – Schitt's Creek (Pop TV)
Individual Achievement in Drama	Michelle Williams – Fosse/Verdon (FX)	Amy Adams – Sharp Objects (HBO); Patricia Arquette – Escape at Dannemora (Showtime); Christine Baranski – The Good Fight (CBS All Access); Jodie Comer – Killing Eve (BBC America); Billy Porter – Pose (FX)
Outstanding Achievement in News and Information	Leaving Neverland (HBO)	60 Minutes (CBS); America to Me (Starz); Our Planet (Netflix); The Rachel Maddow Show (MSNBC); Surviving R. Kelly (Lifetime)
Outstanding Achievement in Sketch/Variety Shows	Last Week Tonight with John Oliver (HBO)	Desus & Mero (Showtime); Full Frontal with Samantha Bee (TBS); I Think You Should Leave with Tim Robinson (Netflix); Late Night with Seth Meyers (NBC); The Late Show with Stephen Colbert (CBS)
Outstanding Achievement in Reality Programming	Queer Eye (Netflix)	The Great British Baking Show (PBS); Making It (NBC); Nailed It! (Netflix); Salt, Fat, Acid, Heat (Netflix); Tidying Up with Marie Kondo (Netflix)
Outstanding Achievement in Youth Programming	Arthur (PBS Kids)	Carmen Sandiego (Netflix); Daniel Tiger's Neighborhood (PBS Kids); Muppet Babies (Disney Junior); Odd Squad (PBS Kids); Sesame Street (HBO)
Heritage Award	Deadwood	
Career Achievement Award	David Milch	

=== Shows with multiple nominations ===
The following shows received multiple nominations:

Nominations	Recipient
4	Pose
4	Russian Doll
3	Fleabag
2	Barry
2	Chernobyl
2	Escape at Dannemora
2	Fosse/Verdon
2	The Good Fight
2	Killing Eve
2	Schitt's Creek
2	Sharp Objects
2	Succession
2	Veep
2	When They See Us

=== Shows with multiple wins ===
Wins	Recipient
3	Fleabag
