= Take Out with Lisa Ling =

American documentary television series

- Genre: Documentary
- Starring: Lisa Ling
- Country of origin: United States
- Original language: English
- No. of episodes: 6

Original release
- Network: HBO Max
- Release: January 27, 2022

Take Out with Lisa Ling is a documentary television series about Asian American cuisine.

== See also ==
- List of HBO Max original programming
