= 36th TCA Awards =

US television awards ceremony in 2020

- Date: September 14, 2020
- Venue: N/A (Note: Due to the COVID-19 pandemic, the winners were announced in an online event.)

Highlights
- Program of the Year: Watchmen
- Outstanding New Program: Watchmen

The 36th TCA Awards were announced on September 14, 2020, via an online event due to the COVID-19 pandemic. The nominees were announced by the Television Critics Association on July 9, 2020.

== Winners and nominees ==
Category	Winner	Nominees
Program of the Year	Watchmen (HBO)	Better Call Saul (AMC); Mrs. America (FX on Hulu); Schitt's Creek (Pop TV); Succession (HBO); Unbelievable (Netflix)
Outstanding Achievement in Comedy	Schitt's Creek (Pop TV)	Better Things (FX); Dead to Me (Netflix); The Good Place (NBC); Insecure (HBO); What We Do in the Shadows (FX)
Outstanding Achievement in Drama	Succession (HBO)	Better Call Saul (AMC); The Crown (Netflix); Euphoria (HBO); The Good Fight (CBS All Access); Pose (FX)
Outstanding Achievement in Movies, Miniseries and Specials	Watchmen (HBO)	Little Fires Everywhere (Hulu); Mrs. America (FX on Hulu); Normal People (Hulu); The Plot Against America (HBO); Unbelievable (Netflix)
Outstanding New Program	Watchmen (HBO)	The Great (Hulu); The Mandalorian (Disney+); The Morning Show (Apple TV+); Never Have I Ever (Netflix); Zoey's Extraordinary Playlist (NBC)
Individual Achievement in Comedy	Catherine O'Hara — Schitt's Creek (Pop TV)	Pamela Adlon — Better Things (FX); Christina Applegate — Dead to Me (Netflix); Elle Fanning — The Great (Hulu); Issa Rae — Insecure (HBO); Ramy Youssef — Ramy (Hulu)
Individual Achievement in Drama	Regina King — Watchmen (HBO)	Cate Blanchett — Mrs. America (FX on Hulu); Kaitlyn Dever — Unbelievable (Netflix); Mark Ruffalo — I Know This Much Is True (HBO); Rhea Seehorn — Better Call Saul (AMC); Jeremy Strong — Succession (HBO); Merritt Wever — Unbelievable (Netflix)
Outstanding Achievement in News and Information	The Last Dance (ESPN)	60 Minutes (CBS); Frontline (PBS); Hillary (Hulu); McMillions (HBO); The Rachel Maddow Show (MSNBC)
Outstanding Achievement in Sketch/Variety Shows	A Black Lady Sketch Show (HBO)	The Daily Show with Trevor Noah (Comedy Central); Full Frontal with Samantha Bee (TBS); Last Week Tonight with John Oliver (HBO); Late Night with Seth Meyers (NBC); Saturday Night Live (NBC)
Outstanding Achievement in Reality Programming	Cheer (Netflix)	Encore! (Disney+); Holey Moley (ABC); Making It (NBC); Top Chef: All-Stars L.A. (Bravo); We're Here (HBO)
Outstanding Achievement in Youth Programming	Molly of Denali (PBS Kids)	Carmen Sandiego (Netflix); Daniel Tiger's Neighborhood (PBS Kids); Odd Squad (PBS Kids); Wild Kratts (PBS Kids); Xavier Riddle and the Secret Museum (PBS Kids)
Heritage Award	Star Trek (CBS)	
Career Achievement Award	Alex Trebek	

=== Shows with multiple nominations ===
The following shows received multiple nominations:

Nominations	Recipient
4	Unbelievable
4	Watchmen
3	Better Call Saul
3	Mrs. America
3	Schitt's Creek
3	Succession
2	Better Things
2	Dead to Me
2	The Great
2	Insecure

=== Shows with multiple wins ===
The following shows received multiple wins:

Wins	Recipient
4	Watchmen
2	Schitt's Creek
