= Critics' Choice Television Award for Best Talk Show =

Annual award by the Broadcast Television Critics Association

- Country: United States
- Presented by: Critics Choice Association
- First award: 2011
- Currently held by: Jimmy Kimmel Live! (2026)
- Website: criticschoice.com

The Critics' Choice Television Award for Best Talk Show is one of the award categories presented annually by the Critics' Choice Television Awards (BTJA). It was introduced in 2011 when the event was first initiated. The winners are selected by a group of television critics that are part of the Broadcast Television Critics Association.

== Winners and nominees ==
indicates the winner

=== 2010s ===
| Year | Title | Network |
|---|---|---|
| 2011 | The Daily Show with Jon Stewart | Comedy Central |
| 2011 | Chelsea Lately | E! |
| 2011 | The Ellen DeGeneres Show | Syndicated |
| 2011 | Jimmy Kimmel Live! | ABC |
| 2011 | The Oprah Winfrey Show | Syndicated |
| 2012 | Late Night with Jimmy Fallon | NBC |
| 2012 | Conan | TBS |
| 2012 | The Daily Show with Jon Stewart | Comedy Central |
| 2012 | Jimmy Kimmel Live! | ABC |
| 2012 | The View | ABC |
| 2013 | The Daily Show with Jon Stewart | Comedy Central |
| 2013 | Conan | TBS |
| 2013 | The Ellen DeGeneres Show | Syndicated |
| 2013 | Jimmy Kimmel Live! | ABC |
| 2013 | Late Night with Jimmy Fallon | NBC |
| 2013 | Marie | Hallmark Channel |
| 2014 | The Tonight Show Starring Jimmy Fallon | NBC |
| 2014 | Conan | TBS |
| 2014 | The Colbert Report | Comedy Central |
| 2014 | The Daily Show with Jon Stewart | Comedy Central |
| 2014 | The Ellen DeGeneres Show | Syndicated |
| 2014 | Jimmy Kimmel Live! | ABC |
| 2015 | The Daily Show with Jon Stewart | Comedy Central |
| 2015 | The Graham Norton Show | BBC America |
| 2015 | Jimmy Kimmel Live! | ABC |
| 2015 | Last Week Tonight with John Oliver | HBO |
| 2015 | The Late Late Show with James Corden | CBS |
| 2015 | The Tonight Show Starring Jimmy Fallon | NBC |
| 2016 (1) | Last Week Tonight with John Oliver | HBO |
| 2016 (1) | The Daily Show with Jon Stewart | Comedy Central |
| 2016 (1) | The Graham Norton Show | BBC America |
| 2016 (1) | Jimmy Kimmel Live! | ABC |
| 2016 (1) | The Late Late Show with James Corden | CBS |
| 2016 (1) | The Tonight Show Starring Jimmy Fallon | NBC |
| 2016 (2) | The Late Late Show with James Corden | CBS |
| 2016 (2) | The Daily Show with Trevor Noah | Comedy Central |
| 2016 (2) | Full Frontal with Samantha Bee | TBS |
| 2016 (2) | Jimmy Kimmel Live! | ABC |
| 2016 (2) | Last Week Tonight with John Oliver | HBO |
| 2016 (2) | The Tonight Show Starring Jimmy Fallon | NBC |
| 2018 | Jimmy Kimmel Live! | ABC |
| 2018 | The Ellen DeGeneres Show | Syndicated |
| 2018 | Harry | Syndicated |
| 2018 | The Late Late Show with James Corden | CBS |
| 2018 | The Tonight Show Starring Jimmy Fallon | NBC |
| 2018 | Watch What Happens Live with Andy Cohen | Bravo |
| 2019 (Note: The award was split into two and presented at the 1st Critics' Choice Real TV Awards.) | Late-Night Talk Show | |
| 2019 | Last Week Tonight with John Oliver (TIE) | HBO |
| 2019 | The Late Late Show with James Corden (TIE) | CBS |
| 2019 | Full Frontal with Samantha Bee | TBS |
| 2019 | The Daily Show with Trevor Noah | Comedy Central |
| 2019 | The Late Show with Stephen Colbert | CBS |
| 2019 | Talk Show | |
| 2019 | My Next Guest Needs No Introduction with David Letterman | Netflix |
| 2019 | Comedians in Cars Getting Coffee | Netflix |
| 2019 | Red Table Talk | Facebook Watch |
| 2019 | The Ellen DeGeneres Show | Syndicated |
| 2019 | The View | ABC |

=== 2020s ===
| Year | Title | Network |
|---|---|---|
| 2020 | The Late Late Show with James Corden (TIE) | CBS |
| 2020 | Late Night with Seth Meyers (TIE) | NBC |
| 2020 | Desus & Mero | Showtime |
| 2020 | Full Frontal with Samantha Bee | TBS |
| 2020 | The Kelly Clarkson Show | Syndication |
| 2020 | Last Week Tonight with John Oliver | HBO |
| 2021 | Late Night with Seth Meyers | NBC |
| 2021 | Desus & Mero | Showtime |
| 2021 | Full Frontal with Samantha Bee | TBS |
| 2021 | The Kelly Clarkson Show | Syndication |
| 2021 | The Late Show with Stephen Colbert | CBS |
| 2021 | Red Table Talk | Facebook Watch |
| 2022 | Last Week Tonight with John Oliver | HBO |
| 2022 | The Amber Ruffin Show | Peacock |
| 2022 | Desus & Mero | Showtime |
| 2022 | The Kelly Clarkson Show | Syndication |
| 2022 | Late Night with Seth Meyers | Syndication |
| 2022 | Watch What Happens Live with Andy Cohen | Bravo |
| 2023 | Last Week Tonight with John Oliver | HBO |
| 2023 | The Amber Ruffin Show | Peacock |
| 2023 | Full Frontal with Samantha Bee | TBS |
| 2023 | The Kelly Clarkson Show | Syndication |
| 2023 | Late Night with Seth Meyers | NBC |
| 2023 | Watch What Happens Live with Andy Cohen | Bravo |
| 2024 | Last Week Tonight with John Oliver | HBO / Max |
| 2024 | The Graham Norton Show | BBC America |
| 2024 | Jimmy Kimmel Live! | ABC |
| 2024 | The Kelly Clarkson Show | Syndication |
| 2024 | Late Night with Seth Meyers | NBC |
| 2024 | The Late Show with Stephen Colbert | CBS |
| 2025 | John Mulaney Presents: Everybody's in LA | Netflix |
| 2025 | The Daily Show | Comedy Central |
| 2025 | The Graham Norton Show | BBC America |
| 2025 | Hot Ones | YouTube |
| 2025 | The Kelly Clarkson Show | NBC / Syndication |
| 2025 | The Late Show with Stephen Colbert | CBS |
| 2026 | Jimmy Kimmel Live! | ABC |
| 2026 | The Daily Show | Comedy Central |
| 2026 | Hot Ones | YouTube |
| 2026 | Late Night with Seth Meyers | NBC |
| 2026 | The Late Show with Stephen Colbert | CBS |
| 2026 | Watch What Happens Live with Andy Cohen | Bravo |

== Multiple wins ==
5 wins

- Last Week Tonight with John Oliver (3 consecutive)

3 wins

- The Daily Show
- The Late Late Show with James Corden

2 wins

- Jimmy Kimmel Live!
- Late Night with Seth Meyers (consecutive)

== Multiple nominations ==
10 nominations

- The Daily Show
- Jimmy Kimmel Live!

8 nominations

- Last Week Tonight with John Oliver

6 nominations

- The Kelly Clarkson Show
- Late Night with Seth Meyers

5 nominations

- The Ellen DeGeneres Show
- Full Frontal with Samantha Bee
- The Late Late Show with James Corden
- The Late Show with Stephen Colbert
- The Tonight Show Starring Jimmy Fallon

4 nominations

- The Graham Norton Show
- Watch What Happens Live with Andy Cohen

3 nominations

- Conan
- Desus & Mero

2 nominations

- The Amber Ruffin Show
- Hot Ones
- Late Night with Jimmy Fallon
- The View

== See also ==
- Primetime Emmy Award for Outstanding Variety Series
- Primetime Emmy Award for Outstanding Variety Talk Series
- Daytime Emmy Award for Outstanding Talk Show Informative
- Daytime Emmy Award for Outstanding Talk Show Entertainment
