= Ziwe (talk show) =

American late-night talk show

- Genre: Late-night talk show Variety/Sketch show Cringe comedy
- Created by: Ziwe Fumudoh
- Starring: Ziwe Fumudoh
- Theme music composer: Nicholas Britell
- Country of origin: United States
- Original language: English
- No. of seasons: 2
- No. of episodes: 18

Production
- Executive producers: Ziwe Fumudoh; Jamund Washington; Hunter Speese; Alli Reich; Ravi Nandan; Jo Firestone
- Producers: Iman Young; Corey Deckler (season 1); Mary Beth Minthorn (season 1); Kerri Hundley
- Cinematography: Christine Ng
- Editors: Cori Wapnowska; Janis Vogel; Danny Scharar
- Running time: 24-33 minutes
- Production companies: A24; Generation Ziwe

Original release
- Network: Showtime
- Release: May 9, 2021 – December 25, 2022

Ziwe is an American satirical late-night talk show hosted and executive produced by comedian Ziwe Fumudoh based in New York City. The show premiered on May 9, 2021, on Showtime.

In April 2023, Showtime cancelled the series after two seasons.

The premise of the show was to interview celebrities who pride themselves on being progressive and overtly challenging them and their belief systems.

== Episodes ==
=== Series overview ===
Season	Episodes	Originally released	
Season	Episodes	First released	Last released
1	6	May 9, 2021	June 13, 2021
2	12	May 1, 2022	December 25, 2022

=== Season 1 (2021) ===
No. overall	No. in season	Title	Original release date	U.S. viewers (millions)
1	1	"55%"	May 9, 2021	0.049
Guests: Fran Lebowitz, Gloria Steinem, Cristin Milioti, Jane Krakowski and Cole Escola.
2	2	"Beauty Standards"	May 16, 2021	N/A
Guests: Eboni K. Williams, Rachel Lindsay, Cole Escola, Jeremy O. Harris, Sam Taggart, Sydnee Washington and Jordan Mendoza.
3	3	"Wealth Hoarders"	May 23, 2021	0.34
Guests: Patti Harrison, Bowen Yang and Andrew Yang.
4	4	"Allyship"	May 30, 2021	N/A
Guests: Phoebe Bridgers, Lil Rel Howery, Rachel Brosnahan, Christopher Meloni and Patti Harrison.
5	5	"Immigration"	June 6, 2021	N/A
Guests: Julio Torres, Julian Castro, Laura Benanti, Michelle Davis, Cole Escola, Jordan Mendoza, Grace Kuhlenschmidt and Pat Regan.
6	6	"Whitewashing"	June 13, 2021	N/A
Guests: Adam Pally, Stacey Abrams, Laura Benanti, Phoebe Bridgers, Michelle Davis, Patti Harrison, Cole Escola, Sam Taggart and Heléne Yorke.

=== Season 2 (2022) ===
No. overall	No. in season	Title	Original release date	U.S. viewers (millions)
7	1	"Critical Race Theory"	May 1, 2022 (Note: Critical Race Theory was released on Showtime's on-demand and streaming platforms on April 29, 2022.)	N/A
Guests: Charlamagne tha God, Amandla Stenberg, Jocelyn Bioh, Nore Davis, Larry Owens, Sam Salvodon, Kaitlynn Edgar, Alizia Russell and Ike Ufomadu.
8	2	"Celebrity Rights Activist"	May 8, 2022	0.49
Guests: Chet Hanks, DeuxMoi, Jo Firestone, Brandon Gray and Martell Ruffin.
9	3	"Socially Liberal, Fiscally Conservative"	May 15, 2022	0.51
Guests: Nicole Byer, Hannibal Buress, Brianna Cameron, Olivia Lu, Derrick Delgado, Ronald Metellus and Sam Salvodon.
10	4	"Hot!"	May 22, 2022	0.19
Guests: Ilana Glazer, Jane Krakowski and Ike Ufomadu
11	5	"Empowerment"	May 29, 2022	0.26
Guests: Emily Ratajkowski, Mia Khalifa, Luann de Lesseps, Heléne York, Aparna Nancherla, Cole Escola and Michelle Davis.
12	6	"Gay Pride!"	June 5, 2022	0.34
Guests: Katya Zamolodchikova, Adam Pally, Pat Regan, Rowan Blanchard, Ricky Allure, Sam Taggart, Ike Ufomadu, Michelle Davis, Ronald Metellus, Jen Goma and Celine Edmondson.
13	7	"Men!"	November 20, 2022	N/A
Guests: Michael Che, Julia Fox, Benito Skinner, Michael Antonucci, George Civeris, Sam Taggart and Ronald Metellus
14	8	"Democracy"	November 27, 2022	N/A
Guests: Bob the Drag Queen, DeRay Mckesson and Ike Ufomadu.
15	9	"Tech"	December 4, 2022	N/A
Guests: Blake Griffin, Joel Kim Booster, Amy Sedaris, Scott Adsit and Michelle Davis.
16	10	"Diversity Training"	December 11, 2022	N/A
Guests: Amber Riley, Josh Sharp, Marie Faustin, Michelle Davis and Ike Ufomadu.
17	11	"Miss Universe"	December 18, 2022	N/A
Guests: Drew Barrymore, Melody Kimmel, Aparna Nancherla, Chloe Cherry and River Ramirez.
18	12	"Juneteenth"	December 25, 2022	N/A
Guests: Wayne Brady, Laura Benanti, Larry Owens, Michelle Davis, Ronald Metellus, Sam Taggart, Ike Ufomadu, Zaire Saa Hallie, John Reynolds, Jackie Hoffman and AnnaSophia Robb

== Production ==
In October 2020, it was announced Ziwe Fumudoh would star and executive produce a late-night talk show and variety series for Showtime, produced by A24. The series was filmed over the course of 15 days in February 2021. Nicholas Britell composed the series theme song.

In June 2021, Showtime renewed the series for a second season.

== Reception ==
On Rotten Tomatoes, the series holds an approval rating of 73% based on 11 reviews, with an average rating of 6.00/10. On Metacritic, the series holds a rating of 69 out of 100, based on 8 critics, indicating "generally favorable reviews".
