= List of awards and nominations received by The Larry Sanders Show =

List of awards won by The Larry Sanders Show.
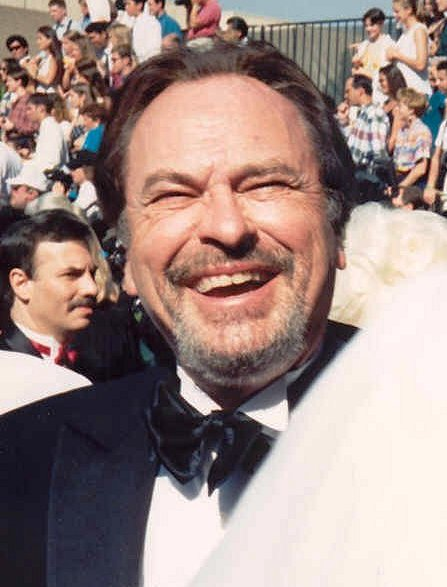
- Rip Torn received many awards and nominations for his performance as producer Artie.
Awards and nominations
Award	Won	Nominated
ACE Eddie Awards	2	4
American Comedy Awards	4	9
American Television Awards	0	3
Artios Awards	1	7
British Comedy Awards	2	2
CableACE Awards	14	37
Directors Guild of America Awards	0	5
Emmy Awards	3	56
Golden Globe Awards	0	5
GLAAD Media Awards	0	1
Image Awards	0	1
OFTA TV Awards	9	23
Peabody Award	2	2
Rose d'Or	1	1
Satellite Awards	1	5
TCA Awards	2	8
Writers Guild of America Award	0	6
- Total number of wins and nominations
Totals	46	184
- References

The Larry Sanders Show is an American television situation comedy series created by Garry Shandling and Dennis Klein and produced by Brillstein-Grey Entertainment, Columbia Pictures Television, and HBO. The show originally aired in the United States on HBO between August 15, 1992, and May 31, 1998, with 89 episodes split over six seasons. The series is set in the office and studio of the fictional late-night talk show and features Shandling as the titular character Larry Sanders, the talk show's host and namesake.

The Larry Sanders Show amassed 184 nominations for various industry awards. This includes 56 Emmy awards (with 3 wins), 3 Golden Globe awards, 8 TCA awards (with two wins), 5 Satellite Awards (with one win), 5 Directors Guild of America awards and 6 Writers Guild of America awards.

== Awards and nominations ==
=== ACE Eddie Awards ===
Presented since 1962, the Eddie Award is an annual accolade that was created by American Cinema Editors to award outstanding achievements in editing in television and film. Larry Sanders received four nominations for the award for Best Edited Half-Hour Series for Television, winning twice for episodes edited by Paul Anderson, Leslie Dennis Bracken, and Leslie Tolan.

Year	Category	Nominee(s)	Episode(s)	Result	Ref
1995	Best Edited Half-Hour Series for Television	Paul Anderson and Leslie Dennis Bracken	for "The Mr. Sharon Stone Show"	Won	
1996	Best Edited Half-Hour Series for Television	Paul Anderson and Leslie Tolan	for "Eight"	Won	
1997	Best Edited Half-Hour Series for Television	Sean K. Lambert and Leslie Tolan	for "Everybody Loves Larry"	Nominated	
1997	Best Edited Half-Hour Series for Television	Paul Anderson, Sean K. Lambert, and Leslie Tolan	for "Flip"	Nominated	

=== American Comedy Awards ===
The American Comedy Award, created by George Schlatter, is an award that recognizes comedic excellence in film, television, and stage. The Larry Sanders Show received nine award nominations, winning four awards.

Year	Category	Nominee(s)	Result	Ref
1994	Funniest Supporting Male Performer in a TV Series	Rip Torn as Arthur	Won	
1996	Funniest Male Performer in a TV Series (Leading Role) Network, Cable or Syndication	Garry Shandling	Nominated	
1996	Funniest Supporting Female Performer in a TV Series	Janeane Garofalo	Nominated	
1998	Funniest Male Performer in a TV Series (Leading Role) Network, Cable or Syndication	Garry Shandling	Won	
1999	Funniest Male Performer in a TV Series (Leading Role) Network, Cable or Syndication	Garry Shandling	Won	
1999	Funniest Supporting Male Performer in a TV Series	Rip Torn	Nominated	
1999	Funniest Female Guest Appearance in a TV Series	Ellen DeGeneres	Nominated	
1999	Funniest Male Guest Appearance in a TV Series	Jim Carrey	Nominated	
1999	Funniest Male Guest Appearance in a TV Series	David Duchovny	Won	

=== Artios Awards ===
Presented by the Casting Society of America, the Artios Award is an annual accolades honoring outstanding achievements in casting. The Larry Sanders Show received seven nominations during its tenure, winning once in 1993.

Year	Category	Nominee(s)	Result	Ref
1993	Best Casting for TV, Pilot	Marc Hirschfield, Meg Liberman, and Francine Maisler	Won	
1993	Best Casting for TV, Comedy Episodic	Marc Hirschfield, Meg Liberman, and Michael A. Katcher	Nominated	
1994	Best Casting for TV, Comedy Episodic	Marc Hirschfield and Meg Liberman	Nominated	
1995	Best Casting for TV, Comedy Episodic	Marc Hirschfield and Meg Liberman	Nominated	
1996	Best Casting for TV, Comedy Episodic	Marc Hirschfield and Meg Liberman	Nominated	
1997	Best Casting for TV, Comedy Episodic	Marc Hirschfield, Meg Liberman, and Bonnie Zane	Nominated	
1998	Best Casting for TV, Comedy Episodic	Marc Hirschfield and Meg Liberman	Nominated	

=== American Television Awards ===
Year	Category	Nominee(s)	Result	Ref
1993	Best Situation Comedy Series		Nominated	
1993	Best Actor in a Situation Comedy	Garry Shandling	Nominated	
1993	Best Supporting Actor in a Situation Comedy	Rip Torn	Nominated	

=== British Comedy Awards ===
The British Comedy Award is an annual accolade that recognizes the best comedic performances in film, radio, stage, and television. The Larry Sanders Show received two awards for Best International Comedy Show.

Year	Category	Nominee(s)	Result	Ref
1997	Best International Comedy Show		Won	
1999	Best International Comedy Show		Won	

=== Cable ACE Awards ===
The CableACE Award, created by the National Cable Television Association, was an annual accolade that recognizes the best in cable television. Originally thought of as the cable equivalent of the Primetime Emmy Awards, the award became obsolete after 1997 when cable shows were included among the Primetime Emmy nominees. The Larry Sanders Show received 47 nominations during its tenure, winning 14 CableACE awards.

Year	Category	Nominee(s)	Episodes(s)	Result	Ref
1993	Comedy Series	Fred Barron, Brad Grey, Garry Shandling, Peter Tolan, John Ziffren		Won	
1993	Actor in a Comedy Series	Garry Shandling		Nominated	
1993	Directing a Comedy Series	Ken Kwapis	for "The Spiders"	Nominated	
1993	Writing a Comedy Series	Garry Shandling, Rosie Shuster, Paul Simms and Peter Tolan	for "The Spiders"	Nominated	
1993	Writing a Comedy Series	Peter Tolan	for "The Garden Weasel"	Nominated	
1994	Comedy Series	Judd Apatow, Fred Barron, Dick Blasucci, Brad Grey, Brad Isaacs, Garry Shandling, Peter Tolan, John Ziffren		Won	
1994	Actor in a Comedy Series	Garry Shandling		Nominated	
1994	Actor in a Comedy Series	Jeffrey Tambor		Nominated	
1994	Actor in a Comedy Series	Rip Torn		Won	
1994	Directing a Comedy Series	Todd Holland	for "The Guest Host"	Won	
1994	Directing a Comedy Series	Ken Kwapis	for "The Performance Artist"	Nominated	
1994	Directing a Comedy Series	Roy London	for "The List"	Nominated	
1994	Writing a Comedy Series	Maya Forbes, Victor Levin, Drake Sather, Paul Simms and Garry Shandling	for "Larry's Agent"	Won	
1994	Writing a Comedy Series	Garry Shandling and Paul Simms	for "The Guest Host"	Nominated	
1994	Writing a Comedy Series	Garry Shandling, Paul Simms and Chris Thompson	for "The Breakdown"	Nominated	
1994	Writing a Comedy Series	Paul Simms	for "Hank's Contract"	Nominated	
1995	Comedy Series	Brad Grey, Garry Shandling, Paul Simms, Peter Tolan, John Ziffren, Maya Forbes		Won	
1995	Actor in a Comedy Series	Garry Shandling		Won	
1995	Actor in a Comedy Series	Jeffrey Tambor		Nominated	
1995	Actor in a Comedy Series	Rip Torn		Nominated	
1995	Actress in a Comedy Series	Janeane Garofalo		Nominated	
1995	Directing a Comedy Series	Todd Holland	for "Doubt of the Benefit"	Won	
1995	Directing a Comedy Series	Alan Myerson	for "Arthur's Crisis"	Nominated	
1995	Writing a Comedy Series	Drake Sather, Garry Shandling, and Peter Tolan	for "Doubt of the Benefit"	Won	
1995	Writing a Comedy Series	Maya Forbes	for "The Fourteenth Floor"	Nominated	
1995	Writing a Comedy Series	Maya Forbes, Steve Levitan, and Garry Shandling	for "Roseanne's Return"	Nominated	
1995	Writing a Comedy Series	Paul Simms	for "Hank's Divorce"	Nominated	
1996	Comedy Series	Brad Grey, Garry Shandling, Paul Simms, Peter Tolan, John Ziffren, Maya Forbes		Won	
1996	Actor in a Comedy Series	Garry Shandling		Won	
1996	Actor in a Comedy Series	Jeffrey Tambor		Nominated	
1996	Actor in a Comedy Series	Rip Torn		Nominated	
1996	Actress in a Comedy Series	Janeane Garofalo		Nominated	
1996	Actress in a Comedy Series	Penny Johnson		Nominated	
1997	Comedy Series			Won	
1997	Actor in a Comedy Series	Garry Shandling		Nominated	
1997	Actor in a Comedy Series	Jeffrey Tambor		Nominated	
1997	Actor in a Comedy Series	Rip Torn		Nominated	
1997	Actress in a Comedy Series	Janeane Garofalo		Nominated	
1997	Directing a Comedy Series	Todd Holland	for "Everybody Loves Harry"	Won	
1997	Directing a Comedy Series	Alan Myerson	for "Ellen, Or Isn't She?"	Nominated	
1997	Directing a Comedy Series	John Riggi	for "Artie and Angie and Hank and Hercules"	Nominated	
1997	Writing a Comedy Series	Judd Apatow, John Markus, and Garry Shandling	for "Ellen, Or Isn't She?"	Nominated	
1997	Writing a Comedy Series	Jeff Cesario	for "Pain Equals Funny"	Nominated	
1997	Writing a Comedy Series	Becky Hartman-Edwards, John Riggi, and Garry Shandling	for "The New Writer"	Nominated	
1997	Writing a Comedy Series	Peter Tolan	for "My Name is Asher Kingsley"	Won	
1997	Writing a Comedy Series	Jon Vitti	for "Everybody Loves Larry"	Nominated	

=== Directors Guild of America Awards ===
The Directors Guild of America Award is an annual accolade presented by the Directors Guild of America (DGA) which awards outstanding achievements in the field of directing. The Larry Sanders Show received five nominations during its tenure.

Year	Category	Nominee(s)	Episodes(s)	Result	Ref
1994	Outstanding Directorial Achievement in a Comedy Series	Todd Holland	for "The Mr. Sharon Stone Show"	Nominated	
1995	Outstanding Directorial Achievement in a Comedy Series	Todd Holland	for "Arthur After Hours"	Nominated	
1996	Outstanding Directorial Achievement in a Comedy Series	Todd Holland	for "Everybody Love Larry"	Nominated	
1996	Outstanding Directorial Achievement in a Comedy Series	Alan Myerson	for "Ellen, or Isn't She"	Nominated	
1998	Outstanding Directorial Achievement in a Comedy Series	Todd Holland	for "Flip"	Nominated	

=== Emmy Awards ===
Presented by the Academy of Television Arts & Sciences since 1949, the Primetime Emmy Award is an annual accolade that honors outstanding achievements in various aspects of television such as acting, directing and writing. The Larry Sanders Show received 56 nominations, winning three awards. Rip Torn won the award for Outstanding Supporting Actor in a Comedy Series in 1996. Garry Shandling and Peter Tolan won the award for Outstanding Writing for a Comedy Series in 1997 while Todd Holland won in 1998 for Outstanding Directing for a Comedy Series.

==== Primetime Emmy Awards ====
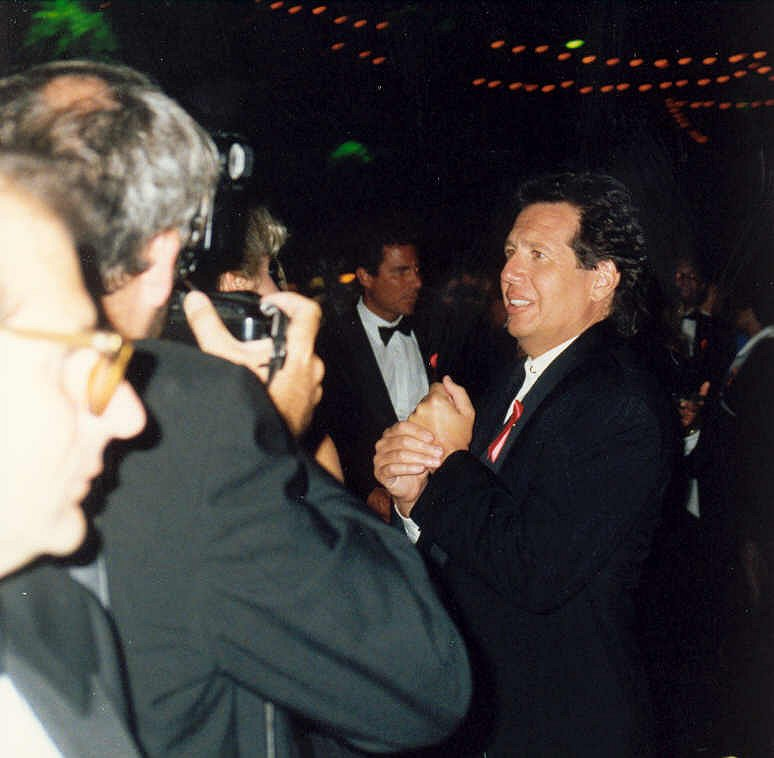
Garry Shandling received five nominations for Outstanding Lead Actor in a Comedy Series, as well as receiving seven nominations for his writing contributions to the show, winning once in 1997, and six nominations for Outstanding Comedy Series, receiving credit as executive producer and creator.

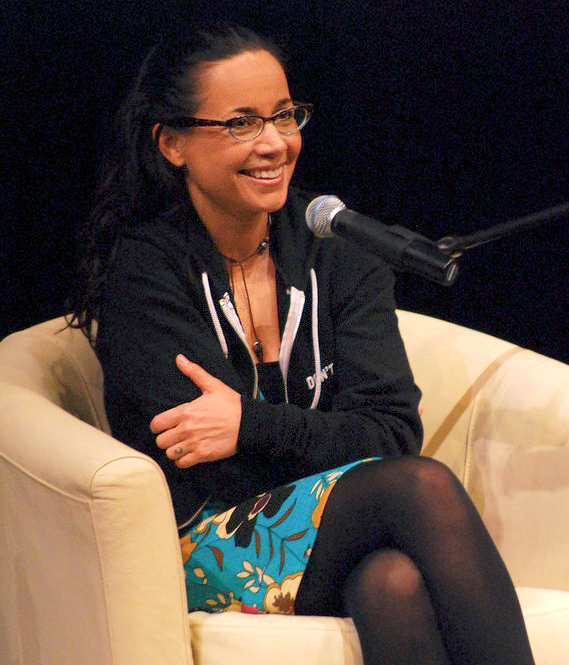
Janeane Garofalo was twice nominated for Outstanding Supporting Actress in a Comedy Series for her role as Paula.

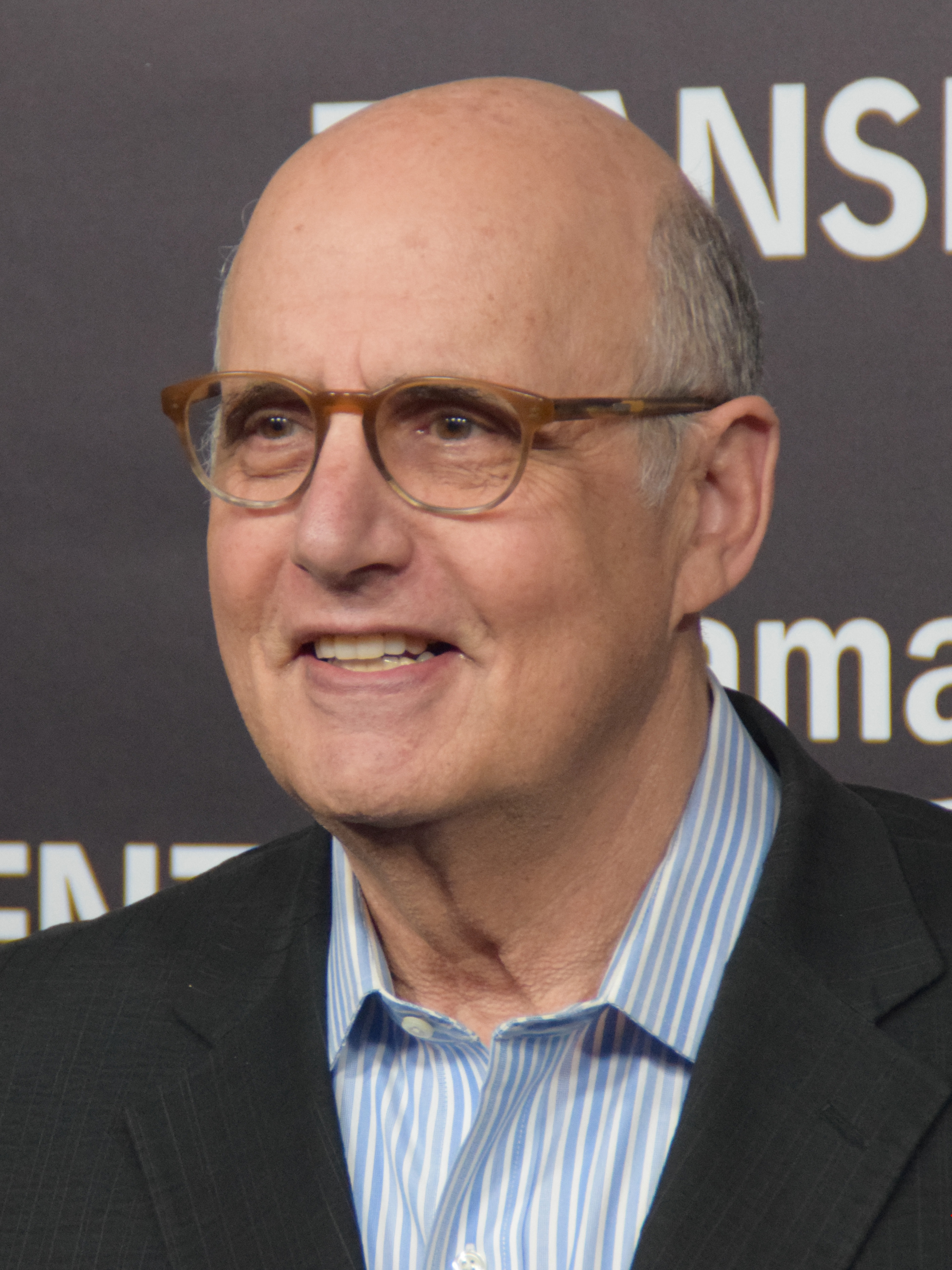
Jeffrey Tambor was nominated four times for his performance on the series.

Year	Category	Nominee(s)	Episodes(s)	Result	Ref
1993	Outstanding Comedy Series	Fred Barron, Dick Blasucci, Brad Grey, Garry Shandling, Peter Tolan and John Ziffren		Nominated	
1993	Outstanding Lead Actor in a Comedy Series	Garry Shandling as Larry Sanders	for "What Have You Done for Me Lately?"	Nominated	
1993	Outstanding Supporting Actor in a Comedy Series	Jeffrey Tambor as Hank Kingsley	for "Guest Host" + "Hank's Contract"	Nominated	
1993	Outstanding Supporting Actor in a Comedy Series	Rip Torn as Arthur	for "The Spiders Episode" + "The New Producer"	Nominated	
1993	Outstanding Guest Actor in a Comedy Series	Dana Carvey as Himself	for "Guest Host"	Nominated	
1993	Outstanding Guest Actress in a Comedy Series	Carol Burnett as Herself	for "The Spiders Episode"	Nominated	
1993	Outstanding Individual Achievement in Writing in a Comedy Series	Garry Shandling, Dennis Klein	for "The Hey Now Episode"	Nominated	
1993	Outstanding Individual Achievement in Writing in a Comedy Series	Garry Shandling, Paul Simms, Peter Tolan, Rosie Shuster	for "The Spiders Episode"	Nominated	
1994	Outstanding Comedy Series	Judd Apatow, Brad Grey, Brad Isaacs, Garry Shandling, Paul Simms, Peter Tolan and John Ziffren		Nominated	
1994	Outstanding Supporting Actor in a Comedy Series	Rip Torn as Arthur	for "The List" + "Larry’s Birthday"	Nominated	
1994	Outstanding Individual Achievement in Directing in a Comedy Series	Todd Holland	for "Life Behind Larry"	Nominated	
1994	Outstanding Individual Achievement in Writing in a Comedy Series	Garry Shandling, Victor Levin, Paul Simms, Drake Sather and Maya Forbes	for "Larry's Agent"	Nominated	
1995	Outstanding Comedy Series	Maya Forbes, Brad Grey, Garry Shandling, Paul Simms, Peter Tolan and John Ziffren		Nominated	
1995	Outstanding Lead Actor in a Comedy Series	Garry Shandling as Larry Sanders	for "The Mr. Sharon Stone Show"	Nominated	
1995	Outstanding Supporting Actor in a Comedy Series	Rip Torn as Arthur	for "Like No Business I Know" + "Arthur's Crisis"	Nominated	
1995	Outstanding Individual Achievement in Directing for a Comedy Series	Todd Holland	for "Hank's Night in the Sun"	Nominated	
1995	Outstanding Individual Achievement in Writing for a Comedy Series	Garry Shandling and Peter Tolan	for "The Mr. Sharon Stone Show"	Nominated	
1995	Outstanding Individual Achievement in Writing for a Comedy Series	Peter Tolan	for "Hank's Night in the Sun"	Nominated	
1996	Outstanding Comedy Series	Judd Apatow, Maya Forbes, Brad Grey, Todd Holland, Steve Levitan, John Riggi, Garry Shandling, Jon Vitti and John Ziffren		Nominated	
1996	Outstanding Lead Actor in a Comedy Series	Garry Shandling as Larry Sanders		Nominated	
1996	Outstanding Supporting Actor in a Comedy Series	Jeffrey Tambor as Hank Kingsley	for "Hank's New Assistant" + "Nothing Personal"	Nominated	
1996	Outstanding Supporting Actor in a Comedy Series	Rip Torn as Arthur	for "Arthur After Hours" + "The P.A."	Won	
1996	Outstanding Supporting Actress in a Comedy Series	Janeane Garofalo as Paula	for "Conflict of Interest" + "I Was a Teenage Lesbian"	Nominated	
1996	Outstanding Guest Actor in a Comedy Series	Mandy Patinkin as Himself	for "Eight"	Nominated	
1996	Outstanding Guest Actress in a Comedy Series	Rosie O'Donnell as Herself	for "Eight"	Nominated	
1996	Outstanding Directing in a Comedy Series	Todd Holland	for "Arthur After Hours"	Nominated	
1996	Outstanding Directing in a Comedy Series	Michael Lehmann	for "I Was a Teenage Lesbian"	Nominated	
1996	Outstanding Writing for a Comedy Series	Maya Forbes, Steve Levitan and Garry Shandling	for "Roseanne's Return"	Nominated	
1996	Outstanding Writing for a Comedy Series	Peter Tolan	for "Arthur After Hours"	Nominated	
1996	Outstanding Writing for a Comedy Series	Jon Vitti	for "Hank’s Sex Tape"	Nominated	
1997	Outstanding Comedy Series	Judd Apatow, Jeff Cesario, Brad Grey, Becky Hartman Edwards, Todd Holland, Carol Leifer, John Markus, Earl Pomerantz, John Riggi, Garry Shandling, Jon Vitti and John Ziffren		Nominated	
1997	Outstanding Lead Actor in a Comedy Series	Garry Shandling as Larry Sanders	for "Everybody Loves Larry"	Nominated	
1997	Outstanding Supporting Actor in a Comedy Series	Jeffrey Tambor as Hank Kingsley		Nominated	
1997	Outstanding Supporting Actor in a Comedy Series	Rip Torn as Arthur		Nominated	
1997	Outstanding Supporting Actress in a Comedy Series	Janeane Garofalo as Paula		Nominated	
1997	Outstanding Guest Actor in a Comedy Series	David Duchovny as Himself	for "Everybody Loves Larry"	Nominated	
1997	Outstanding Guest Actress in a Comedy Series	Ellen DeGeneres as Herself	for "Ellen, Or Isn't She?"	Nominated	
1997	Outstanding Directing for a Comedy Series	Todd Holland	for "Everybody Loves Larry"	Nominated	
1997	Outstanding Directing for a Comedy Series	Alan Myerson	for "Ellen, Or Isn't She?"	Nominated	
1997	Outstanding Writing in a Comedy Series	Judd Apatow, John Markus and Garry Shandling	for "Ellen, Or Isn't She?"	Nominated	
1997	Outstanding Writing in a Comedy Series	Peter Tolan	for "My Name is Asher Kingsley"	Nominated	
1997	Outstanding Writing in a Comedy Series	Jon Vitti	for "Everybody Loves Larry"	Nominated	
1998	Outstanding Comedy Series	Judd Apatow, Richard Day, Michael Fitzsimmons, Alex Gregory, Brad Grey, Peter Huyck, Adam Resnick, Garry Shandling and Craig Zisk		Nominated	
1998	Outstanding Lead Actor in a Comedy Series	Garry Shandling as Larry Sanders	for "Flip"	Nominated	
1998	Outstanding Supporting Actor in a Comedy Series	Jeffrey Tambor as Hank Kingsley		Nominated	
1998	Outstanding Supporting Actor in a Comedy Series	Rip Torn as Arthur		Nominated	
1998	Outstanding Directing for a Comedy Series	Todd Holland	for "Flip"	Won	
1998	Outstanding Writing for a Comedy Series	Richard Day, Alex Gregory and Peter Huyck	for "Putting The 'Gay' Back In Litigation"	Nominated	
1998	Outstanding Writing for a Comedy Series	Garry Shandling and Peter Tolan	for "Flip"	Won	

==== Creative Arts Emmy Awards ====
Year	Category	Nominee(s)	Episodes(s)	Result	Ref
1997	Outstanding Multi-Camera Picture Editing for a Series	Paul Anderson and Leslie Tolan	for "My Name is Asher Kingsley"	Nominated	
1997	Outstanding Multi-Camera Picture Editing for a Series	Sean K. Lambert and Leslie Tolan	for "Everybody Loves Larry"	Nominated	
1997	Outstanding Lighting Direction (Electronic) for a Comedy Series	Peter Smokler	for "Ellen, Or Isn't She"	Nominated	
1997	Outstanding Sound Mixing for a Comedy Series or a Special	John Bickelhaupt, Ed Golya and Edward L. Moskowitz	for "Ellen, Or Isn't She"	Nominated	
1998	Outstanding Multi-Camera Picture Editing for a Series	Paul Anderson, Sean K. Lambert and Leslie Tolan	for "Flip"	Nominated	
1998	Outstanding Lighting Direction (Electronic) for a Comedy Series	Peter Smokler	for "Flip"	Nominated	
1998	Outstanding Sound Mixing for a Comedy Series or a Special	John Bickelhaupt, Ed Golya and Edward L. Moskowitz	for "Flip"	Nominated	

=== GLAAD Media Awards ===
The GLAAD Media Award is an annual accolade bestowed by the Gay & Lesbian Alliance Against Defamation (GLAAD) that recognizes outstanding representations of the lesbian, gay, bisexual and transgender (LGBT) community in media. The Larry Sanders Show received a nomination for Outstanding TV Comedy Series.

Year	Category	Nominee(s)	Result	Ref
1997	Outstanding TV Comedy Series		Nominated	

=== Golden Globe Awards ===
The Golden Globe Award is an annual accolade presented by the Hollywood Foreign Press Association (HFPA) which honors the best performances in television and film. The Larry Sanders Show was for Best Television Series – Musical or Comedy while Garry Shandling was nominated twice for Best Actor – Television Series Musical or Comedy.

Year	Category	Nominee(s)	Result	Ref
1994	Best Actor – Television Series Musical or Comedy	Garry Shandling as Larry Sanders	Nominated	
1995	Best Actor – Television Series Musical or Comedy	Garry Shandling as Larry Sanders	Nominated	
1996	Best Television Series – Musical or Comedy		Nominated	

=== Image Awards ===
The Image Award, created by the National Association for the Advancement of Colored People (NAACP), is an annual accolade that honors outstanding achievement in film, television, music and literature by people of color. Penny Johnson Jerald received a nomination for Outstanding Supporting Actress in a Comedy Series.

Year	Category	Nominee(s)	Result	Ref
1994	Outstanding Supporting Actress in a Comedy Series	Penny Johnson Jerald	Nominated	

=== Peabody Awards ===
Awarded since 1940, the Peabody Award, named after American banker and philanthropist George Peabody, is an annual award the recognizes excellence in storytelling across mediums including television, radio, television networks, and online videos. The Larry Sanders Show won the award for the year of 1993 for its "dead-on depiction from the lines of the late-night wars." The show won again in 1998 for its series finale "Flip".

Year	Nominee(s)	Episode(s)	Result	Ref
1993	HBO, Brillstein-Grey Entertainment		Won	
1998	HBO, Brillstein-Grey Entertainment	for "Flip"	Won	

=== Golden Rose ===
The Golden Rose is an award presented by Eurovision at the Rose d'Or Light Entertainment Festival. The Larry Sanders Show won the Silver Rose for Sitcom in 1997.

Year	Category	Nominee(s)	Result	Ref
1997	Silver Rose – Sitcom		Won	

=== Satellite Awards ===
The Satellite Award is an annual accolade, presented since 1997, which recognizes the best in film and television. The Larry Sanders Show received five nominations, winning the award for Best Television Series – Musical or Comedy.

Year	Category	Nominee(s)	Result	Ref
1996	Best Television Series – Musical or Comedy		Won	
1996	Best Actor – Television Series Musical or Comedy	Garry Shandling	Nominated	
1996	Best Actor – Television Series Musical or Comedy	Rip Torn	Nominated	
1997	Best Television Series – Musical or Comedy		Nominated	
1997	Best Actor – Television Series Musical or Comedy	Garry Shandling	Nominated	

=== Television Critics Association Awards ===
Awarded by Television Critics Association since 1985, the Television Critics Association Award (TCA Award) is an annual accolade that recognizes outstanding achievements in television programming and acting performances. The Larry Sanders Show has received eight nominations—six for Outstanding Achievement in Comedy, one for Individual Achievement in Comedy and the Heritage Award. The series won in 1997 and 1998 for Outstanding Achievement in Comedy.

Year	Category	Nominee(s)	Result	Ref
1993	Outstanding Achievement in Comedy		Nominated	
1994	Outstanding Achievement in Comedy		Nominated	
1995	Outstanding Achievement in Comedy		Nominated	
1996	Outstanding Achievement in Comedy		Nominated	
1997	Outstanding Achievement in Comedy		Won	
1997	Individual Achievement in Comedy	Rip Torn	Nominated	
1998	Outstanding Achievement in Comedy		Won	

=== Writers Guild of America Awards ===
Presented by the Writers Guild of America (WGA), the Writers Guild of America Award is an annual accolade that recognizes outstanding achievement of writers in film, television, radio, promotional writing and videogames. The Larry Sanders Show received six nominations for Television: Episodic Comedy.

Year	Category	Nominee(s)	Episode(s)	Result	Ref
1996	Television: Episodic Comedy	Maya Forbes, Steven Levitan and Garry Shandling	for "Roseanne's Return"	Nominated	
1996	Television: Episodic Comedy	John Riggi	for "Hank's New Assistant"	Nominated	
1996	Television: Episodic Comedy	Peter Tolan	for "Arthur After Hours"	Nominated	
1997	Television: Episodic Comedy	Peter Tolan	for "Eight"	Nominated	
1998	Television: Episodic Comedy	Judd Apatow, John Markus and Garry Shandling	for "Ellen, or Isn't She?"	Nominated	
1998	Television: Episodic Comedy	Maya Forbes	for "The Book"	Nominated	
