= List of awards and nominations received by 3rd Rock from the Sun =

The sitcom 3rd Rock from the Sun has been nominated for and won a number of major television awards.

== Awards and nominations ==
Awards and nominations received by 3rd Rock from the Sun
Award	Year	Category	Nominee(s)	Result	Ref.
American Cinema Editors Awards	1996	Best Edited Half-Hour Series	Briana London (for "Dick Like Me")	Nominated	
American Cinema Editors Awards	1998	Best Edited Half-Hour Series	Vince Humphrey (for "Indecent Dick")	Nominated	
American Society of Cinematographers Awards	1997	Outstanding Cinematography – Regular Series	Marc Reshovsky (for "Nightmare on Dick Street"	Won	
Artios Awards	1996	Best Casting – Comedy Pilot		Won	
Artios Awards	1996	Best Casting – Episodic Comedy		Nominated	
Artios Awards	1997	Best Casting – Episodic Comedy		Nominated	
Artios Awards	1998	Best Casting – Episodic Comedy		Nominated	
Costume Designers Guild Awards	1999	Excellence in Costume Design – Contemporary Series	Melina Root	Nominated	
Directors Guild of America Awards	1996	Outstanding Directing – Comedy Series	Robert Berlinger (for "See Dick Continue to Run")	Nominated	
Golden Globe Awards	1996	Best Television Series – Musical or Comedy	3rd Rock from the Sun	Won	
Golden Globe Awards	1996	Best Actor in a Television Series – Musical or Comedy	John Lithgow	Won	
Golden Globe Awards	1996	Best Supporting Actress – Series, Miniseries or Television Film	Kristen Johnston	Nominated	
Golden Globe Awards	1997	Best Television Series – Musical or Comedy	3rd Rock from the Sun	Nominated	
Golden Globe Awards	1997	Best Actor in a Television Series – Musical or Comedy	John Lithgow	Nominated	
Golden Globe Awards	1998	Best Actor in a Television Series – Musical or Comedy	John Lithgow	Nominated	
Primetime Emmy Awards	1996	Outstanding Lead Actor in a Comedy Series	John Lithgow	Won	
Primetime Emmy Awards	1996	Outstanding Directing for a Comedy Series	James Burrows (for "Pilot")	Nominated	
Primetime Emmy Awards	1996	Outstanding Hairstyling for a Single-Camera Series	Pixie Schwartz (for "The Dicks They Are a Changin")	Nominated	
Primetime Emmy Awards	1997	Outstanding Comedy Series	Mark Brazill, Marcy Carsey, Patrick Kienlen, Bob Kushell, Caryn Mandabach, Bill Martin, David Sacks, Mike Schiff, Bonnie Turner, Terry Turner, Tom Werner, and Christine Zander	Nominated	
Primetime Emmy Awards	1997	Outstanding Lead Actor in a Comedy Series	John Lithgow	Won	
Primetime Emmy Awards	1997	Outstanding Supporting Actress in a Comedy Series	Kristen Johnston	Won	
Primetime Emmy Awards	1997	Outstanding Choreography	Marguerite Derricks (for "A Nightmare On Dick Street")	Won	
Primetime Emmy Awards	1997	Outstanding Costumes for a Series	Melina Root (for "A Nightmare on Dick Street")	Won	
Primetime Emmy Awards	1997	Outstanding Hairstyling for a Single-Camera Series	Pixie Schwartz and Camille Friend (for "A Nightmare on Dick Street")	Nominated	
Primetime Emmy Awards	1997	Outstanding Sound Mixing for a Comedy Series or a Special	Todd Grace, Jesse Peck, and Craig Porter (for "A Nightmare on Dick Street")	Won	
Primetime Emmy Awards	1997	Outstanding Special Visual Effects	Glen Bennett, Patrick Shearn, and Chris Staves (for "A Nightmare on Dick Street")	Nominated	
Primetime Emmy Awards	1998	Outstanding Comedy Series	Mark Brazill, Marcy Carsey, Michael Glouberman, David Israel, Patrick Kienlen, Bob Kushell, Caryn Mandabach, Bill Martin, Jim O'Doherty, Andrew Orenstein, David Sacks, Mike Schiff, Bonnie Turner, Terry Turner, Tom Werner, and Christine Zander	Nominated	
Primetime Emmy Awards	1998	Outstanding Lead Actor in a Comedy Series	John Lithgow	Nominated	
Primetime Emmy Awards	1998	Outstanding Supporting Actress in a Comedy Series	Kristen Johnston	Nominated	
Primetime Emmy Awards	1998	Outstanding Directing for a Comedy Series	Terry Hughes (for "Dick And The Other Guy")	Nominated	
Primetime Emmy Awards	1998	Outstanding Guest Actor in a Comedy Series	John Cleese	Nominated	
Primetime Emmy Awards	1998	Outstanding Guest Actress in a Comedy Series	Jan Hooks	Nominated	
Primetime Emmy Awards	1998	Outstanding Costumes for a Series	Melina Root (for "36! 24! 36! Dick!")	Nominated	
Primetime Emmy Awards	1998	Outstanding Sound Mixing for a Comedy Series or a Special	Todd Grace, Kathy Oldham, Jesse Peck, and Craig Porter (for "36! 24! 36! Dick!")	Nominated	
Primetime Emmy Awards	1999	Outstanding Lead Actor in a Comedy Series	John Lithgow	Won	
Primetime Emmy Awards	1999	Outstanding Supporting Actress in a Comedy Series	Kristen Johnston	Won	
Primetime Emmy Awards	1999	Outstanding Guest Actor in a Comedy Series	William Shatner (for "Dick's Big Giant Headache")	Nominated	
Primetime Emmy Awards	1999	Outstanding Guest Actress in a Comedy Series	Kathy Bates (for "Alien Hunter")	Nominated	
Primetime Emmy Awards	1999	Outstanding Guest Actress in a Comedy Series	Laurie Metcalf	Nominated	
Primetime Emmy Awards	1999	Outstanding Multi-Camera Picture Editing for a Series	Vince Humphrey (for Dick and Taxes)	Nominated	
Primetime Emmy Awards	1999	Outstanding Sound Mixing for a Comedy Series or a Special	Todd Grace, Jesse Peck, and Craig Porter (for "Dick's Big Giant Headache")	Nominated	
Primetime Emmy Awards	2000	Outstanding Lead Actor in a Comedy Series	John Lithgow	Nominated	
Primetime Emmy Awards	2000	Outstanding Cinematography for a Multi-Camera Series	Ronald W. Browne (for Dick and Harry Fall in a Hole)	Nominated	
Primetime Emmy Awards	2000	Outstanding Sound Mixing for a Comedy Series or a Special	Todd Grace, Jesse Peck, and Craig Porter (for "Dick and Harry Fall in a Hole")	Nominated	
Primetime Emmy Awards	2000	Outstanding Art Direction for a Multi-Camera Series	Garvin Eddy and Tara Stephenson (for "Dial M For Dick")	Nominated	
Primetime Emmy Awards	2001	Outstanding Lead Actor in a Comedy Series	John Lithgow	Nominated	
Satellite Awards	1996	Best Television Series – Musical or Comedy	3rd Rock from the Sun	Nominated	
Satellite Awards	1996	Best Actor in a Television Series – Musical or Comedy	John Lithgow	Won	
Satellite Awards	1996	Best Actress in a Television Series – Musical or Comedy	Jane Curtin	Won	
Satellite Awards	1997	Best Actress in a Television Series – Musical or Comedy	Jane Curtin	Nominated	
Satellite Awards	1998	Best Television Series – Musical or Comedy	3rd Rock from the Sun	Nominated	
Satellite Awards	1998	Best Actor in a Television Series – Musical or Comedy	John Lithgow	Nominated	
Screen Actors Guild Awards	1996	Outstanding Performance by an Ensemble in a Comedy Series	Jane Curtin, Joseph Gordon-Levitt, Kristen Johnston, John Lithgow, and French Stewart	Nominated	
Screen Actors Guild Awards	1996	Outstanding Performance by a Male Actor in a Comedy Series	John Lithgow	Won	
Screen Actors Guild Awards	1996	Outstanding Performance by a Female Actor in a Comedy Series	Kristen Johnston	Nominated	
Screen Actors Guild Awards	1997	Outstanding Performance by an Ensemble in a Comedy Series	Jane Curtin, Joseph Gordon-Levitt, Kristen Johnston, Simbi Khali, Wayne Knight, John Lithgow, French Stewart, and Elmarie Wendel	Nominated	
Screen Actors Guild Awards	1997	Outstanding Performance by a Male Actor in a Comedy Series	John Lithgow	Won	
Screen Actors Guild Awards	1998	Outstanding Performance by an Ensemble in a Comedy Series	Jane Curtin, Joseph Gordon-Levitt, Kristen Johnston, Simbi Khali, Wayne Knight, John Lithgow, French Stewart, and Elmarie Wendel	Nominated	
TCA Awards	1996	Outstanding Achievement in Comedy	3rd Rock from the Sun	Nominated	
TCA Awards	1997	Outstanding Achievement in Comedy	3rd Rock from the Sun	Nominated	
TCA Awards	1997	Individual Achievement in Comedy	John Lithgow	Nominated	
