= List of awards and nominations received by Mad About You =

List of awards won by Mad About You
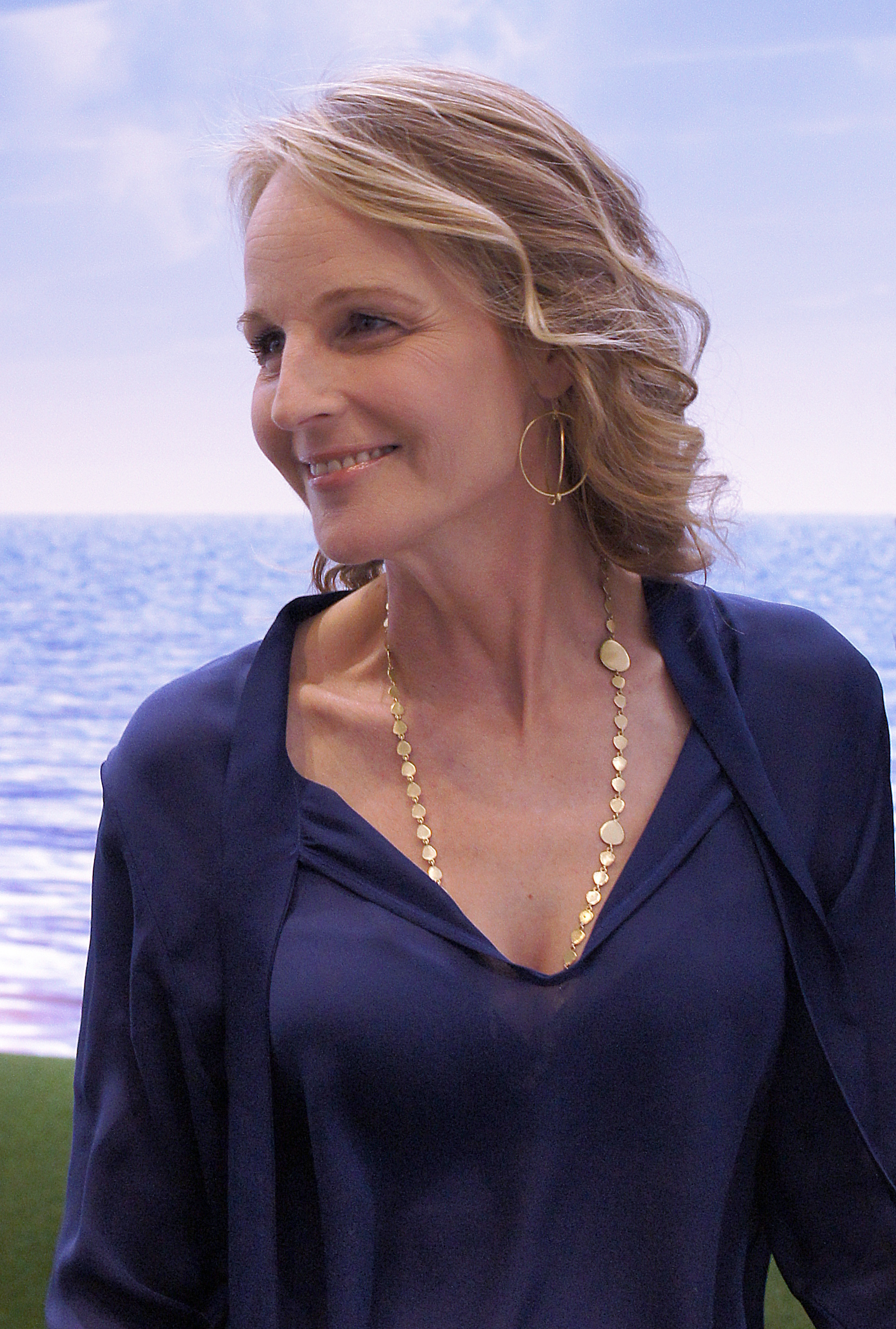
- Helen Hunt (pictured in 2015) received various awards and nominations for her portrayal of Jamie Buchman.
Awards and nominations
	Wins	Nominations
American Comedy Awards	7	14
American Television Awards	0	1
ASCAP Film and Television Music Awards	1	1
Artios Award	0	1
BMI Film & TV Awards	3	3
Directors Guild of America Awards	1	3
Emmy Awards	12	34
GLAAD Media Awards	0	2
Golden Globe Awards	4	13
Hollywood Makeup Artist and Hair Stylist Guild Awards	1	1
OFTA Television Awards	4	18
Peabody Award	1	1
Satellite Award	0	6
Screen Actors Guild Award	1	10
Television Critics Association Awards	0	1
TV Guide Awards	0	1
Viewers for Quality Television Awards	5	17
Writers Guild of America Awards	0	2

Totals
Awards won	40
Nominations	129
- References

Mad About You is an American television sitcom series that has aired on NBC from September 23, 1992, to May 24, 1999. Created by Paul Reiser and Danny Jacobson, the show follows lives of the newly married Buchmans, Paul (Reiser) and Jamie (Helen Hunt).

Mad About You has garnered critical praise for its realistic portrayal of marriage and the chemistry between Reiser and Hunt. Since its debut, the series has been nominated for 34 Primetime Emmy Awards (winning twelve), 13 Golden Globe Awards (winning four), 14 American Comedy Awards (winning seven), 10 Screen Actors Guild Awards (winning one) and 17 Q Awards (winning five), among others.

Helen Hunt stands as the most decorated cast member, winning four consecutive Emmy Awards, three Golden Globe Awards, three American Comedy Awards, three Q Awards, and a Screen Actors Guild Award for her role as Jamie Buchman, as wells as receiving the most award nominations. Guest performers on the series have also received awards and nominations, most notably Mel Brooks and Carol Burnett.

== American Comedy Awards ==
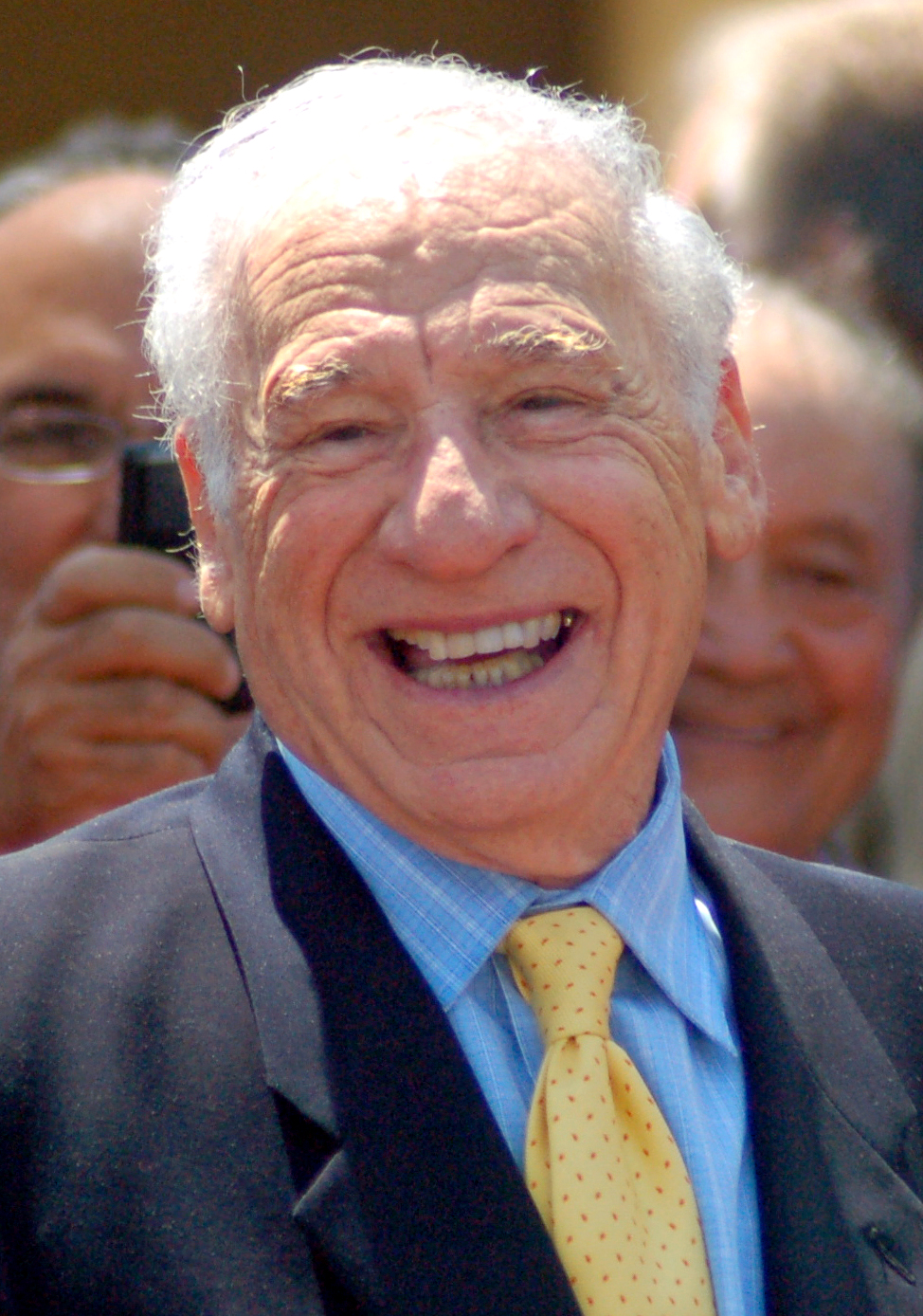
Mel Brooks won the award for Funniest Male Guest Appearance in a TV series twice

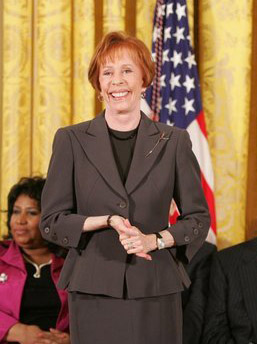
Carol Burnett won the award for Funniest Female Guest Appearance in a TV series in 1997 and 1998

The American Comedy Award is an annual accolade created by George Schlatter in recognition of excellence in the field of comedy, most notably in film and television. Out of 14 nominations, Mad About You won seven awards. Helen Hunt won the award for Funniest Female Performer in a TV Series (Leading Role) Network, Cable or Syndication three times from 1994 to 1996. Mel Brooks won the award for Funniest Male Guest Appearance in a TV Series in 1997 and 2000. Carol Burnett won the award for Funniest Female Guest Appearance in a TV Series in 1997 and 1998.

Year	Category	Nominee(s)	Result	Ref.
1994	Funniest Female Performer in a TV Series (Leading Role) Network, Cable or Syndication	Helen Hunt	Won	
1995	Funniest Female Performer in a TV Series (Leading Role) Network, Cable or Syndication	Helen Hunt	Won	
1996	Funniest Male Performer in a TV Series (Leading Role) Network, Cable or Syndication	Paul Reiser	Nominated	
1996	Funniest Female Performer in a TV Series (Leading Role) Network, Cable or Syndication	Helen Hunt	Won	
1997	Funniest Female Guest Appearance in a TV Series	Carol Burnett	Won	
1997	Funniest Male Guest Appearance in a TV Series	Mel Brooks	Won	
1998	Funniest Female Guest Appearance in a TV Series	Carol Burnett	Won	
1999	Funniest Female Performer in a TV Series (Leading Role) Network, Cable or Syndication	Helen Hunt	Nominated	
1999	Funniest Female Guest Appearance in a TV Series	Carol Burnett	Nominated	
1999	Funniest Female Guest Appearance in a TV Series	Lisa Kudrow	Nominated	
1999	Funniest Male Guest Appearance in a TV Series	Hank Azaria	Nominated	
2000	Funniest Male Guest Appearance in a TV Series	Hank Azaria	Nominated	
2000	Funniest Male Guest Appearance in a TV Series	Mel Brooks	Won	
2000	Funniest Male Guest Appearance in a TV Series	Tim Conway	Nominated	

== Emmy Awards ==
The Primetime Emmy Award is an annual accolade presented by the Academy of Television Arts & Sciences for outstanding achievement in American prime time television programming. The Primetime Emmy Award recognizes outstanding achievement in aspects such as acting, writing, and direction while the more technical aspects such as cinematography, casting and, as of 2011, guest acting performances in television, are awarded at the Creative Arts Emmy Awards. During its tenure, Mad About You received 34 nominations, winning twelve of them. Helen Hunt received a nomination for Outstanding Lead Actress in a Comedy Series for every season the show was on air, winning four consecutive times from 1996 to 1999. Cyndi Lauper and Carol Burnett won the award for Outstanding Guest Actress in a Comedy Series in 1995 and 1997, respectively. Carl Reiner won the award for Outstanding Guest Actor in a Comedy Series in 1995 while Mel Brooks won the award in 1997, 1998 and 1999.

=== Primetime Emmy Awards ===
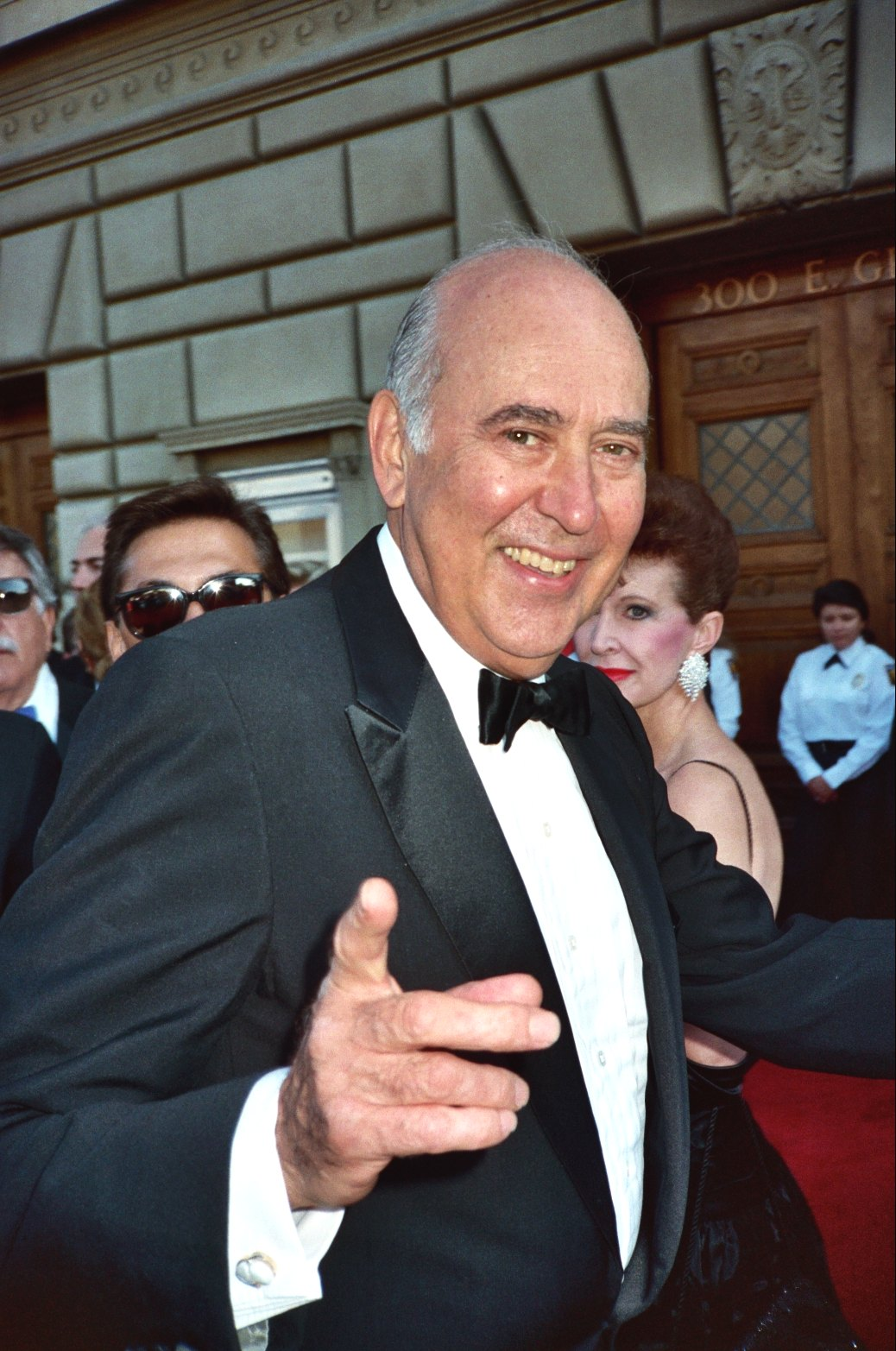
Carl Reiner won an Emmy for his guest performance as Alan Brady

Year	Category	Nominee	Episode	Result	Ref.
1993	Outstanding Lead Actress in a Comedy Series	Helen Hunt	"Pilot"	Nominated	
1994	Outstanding Comedy Series			Nominated	
1994	Outstanding Lead Actor in a Comedy Series	Paul Reiser	"Virtual Reality"	Nominated	
1994	Outstanding Lead Actress in a Comedy Series	Helen Hunt	"Cold Feet"	Nominated	
1994	Outstanding Guest Actress in a Comedy Series	Cyndi Lauper as Marianne Lugasso	"A Pair of Hearts"	Nominated	
1994	Outstanding Individual Achievement in Directing in a Comedy Series	Tom Moore	"Love Letters"	Nominated	
1994	Outstanding Individual Achievement in Directing in a Comedy Series	Lee Shallat-Chemel	"Paul is Dead"	Nominated	
1995	Outstanding Comedy Series			Nominated	
1995	Outstanding Lead Actor in a Comedy Series	Paul Reiser	"Cake Fear"	Nominated	
1995	Outstanding Lead Actress in a Comedy Series	Helen Hunt	"The Ride Home"	Nominated	
1995	Outstanding Guest Actor in a Comedy Series	Carl Reiner as Alan Brady	"The Alan Brady Show"	Won	
1995	Outstanding Guest Actress in a Comedy Series	Cyndi Lauper as Marianne Lugasso	"Money Changes Everything"	Won	
1996	Outstanding Comedy Series			Nominated	
1996	Outstanding Lead Actor in a Comedy Series	Paul Reiser	"Dream Weaver"	Nominated	
1996	Outstanding Lead Actress in a Comedy Series	Helen Hunt	"The Finale"	Won	
1997	Outstanding Comedy Series			Nominated	
1997	Outstanding Lead Actor in a Comedy Series	Paul Reiser	"The Birth"	Nominated	
1997	Outstanding Lead Actress in a Comedy Series	Helen Hunt	"The Birth"	Won	
1997	Outstanding Guest Actor in a Comedy Series	Mel Brooks as Uncle Phil	"The Penis"	Won	
1997	Outstanding Guest Actor in a Comedy Series	Sid Caesar as Harold	"Citizen Buchman"	Nominated	
1997	Outstanding Guest Actress in a Comedy Series	Carol Burnett as Teresa	"Outbreak"	Won	
1998	Outstanding Lead Actor in a Comedy Series	Paul Reiser	"The Conversation"	Nominated	
1998	Outstanding Lead Actress in a Comedy Series	Helen Hunt	"Moody Blues"	Won	
1998	Outstanding Guest Actor in a Comedy Series	Hank Azaria as Nat	"Nat and Arly"	Nominated	
1998	Outstanding Guest Actor in a Comedy Series	Mel Brooks	"Uncle Phil and the Coupons"	Won	
1998	Outstanding Guest Actor in a Comedy Series	Nathan Lane as Professor Twilley	"Good Old Reliable Nathan"	Nominated	
1998	Outstanding Guest Actress in a Comedy Series	Carol Burnett	"Coming Home"	Nominated	
1999	Outstanding Lead Actor in a Comedy Series	Paul Reiser	"The Final Frontier"	Nominated	
1999	Outstanding Lead Actress in a Comedy Series	Helen Hunt	"The Final Frontier"	Won	
1999	Outstanding Guest Actor in a Comedy Series	Mel Brooks	"Uncle Phil Goes Back to High School"	Won	

=== Creative Arts Emmy Awards ===
Year	Category	Nominee(s)	Episode	Result	Ref.
1994	Outstanding Individual Achievement in Sound Mixing for a Comedy Series or a Special	John Bickelhaupt, Peter Damski, Marti D. Humphrey, and Gary D. Rogers	"Surprise"	Won	
1995	Outstanding Individual Achievement in Editing for a Series - Multi-Camera Production	Sheila Amos	"The Ride Home"	Nominated	
1995	Outstanding Individual Achievement in Sound Mixing for a Comedy Series or a Special	John Bickelhaupt, Peter Damski, Marti D. Humphrey, and Gary D. Rogers	"Up In Smoke"	Won	
1996	Outstanding Sound Mixing for a Comedy Series or a Special	John Bickelhaupt, Peter Damski, Marti D. Humphrey, and Ray O'Reilly	"New Year's Eve"	Nominated	

== Golden Globe Awards ==
Presented since 1949, the Golden Globe Award is an annual accolade awarded by the Hollywood Foreign Press Association for outstanding achievements in film and television. Mad About You received 13 nominations during its tenure, winning three awards for Best Actress in a Television Series – Musical or Comedy, awarded to Helen Hunt, and the award for Best Television Series – Musical or Comedy in 1995.

Year	Category	Nominee(s)	Result	Ref.
1993	Best Actress in a Television Series – Musical or Comedy	Helen Hunt	Nominated	
1994	Best Actress in a Television Series – Musical or Comedy	Helen Hunt	Won	
1995	Best Actor in a Television Series – Musical or Comedy	Paul Reiser	Nominated	
1995	Best Actress in a Television Series – Musical or Comedy	Helen Hunt	Won	
1995	Best Television Series – Musical or Comedy		Won	
1996	Best Actor in a Television Series – Musical or Comedy	Paul Reiser	Nominated	
1996	Best Actress in a Television Series – Musical or Comedy	Helen Hunt	Nominated	
1996	Best Television Series – Musical or Comedy		Nominated	
1997	Best Actor in a Television Series – Musical or Comedy	Paul Reiser	Nominated	
1997	Best Actress – Television Series Musical or Comedy	Helen Hunt	Won	
1997	Best Television Series – Musical or Comedy		Nominated	
1998	Best Actor in a Television Series – Musical or Comedy	Paul Reiser	Nominated	
1998	Best Actress – Television Series Musical or Comedy	Helen Hunt	Nominated	

== Online Film & Television Association ==
Year	Category	Nominee(s)	Result	Ref.
1996–97	Best Actress in a Series	Helen Hunt	Won	
1996–97	Best Comedy Series		Nominated	
1996–97	Best Actor in a Comedy Series	Paul Reiser	Nominated	
1996–97	Best Actress in a Comedy Series	Helen Hunt	Won	
1996–97	Best Guest Actor in a Comedy Series	Hank Azaria	Nominated	
1996–97	Best Guest Actor in a Comedy Series	Mel Brooks	Nominated	
1996–97	Best Guest Actress in a Comedy Series	Carol Burnett	Nominated	
1996–97	Best Guest Actress in a Comedy Series	Lisa Kudrow	Nominated	
1996–97	Best Writing in a Comedy Series		Nominated	
1996–97	Best Episode of a Comedy Series	"Jamie's Parents"	Nominated	
1996–97	Best Episode of a Comedy Series	"The Birth"	Nominated	
1997–98	Best Actress in a Comedy Series	Helen Hunt	Nominated	
1997–98	Best Guest Actor in a Comedy Series	Hank Azaria	Won	
1997–98	Best Guest Actress in a Comedy Series	Ellen DeGeneres	Won	
1997–98	Best Guest Actress in a Comedy Series	Lili Taylor	Nominated	
1998–99	Best Actress in a Comedy Series	Helen Hunt	Nominated	
1998–99	Best Guest Actor in a Comedy Series	Hank Azaria	Nominated	
1998–99	Best Guest Actor in a Comedy Series	Mel Brooks	Nominated	

== Satellite Awards ==
The Satellite Award is an annual accolade bestowed by the International Press Academy since 1997 in recognition of outstanding achievements in film, television and new media. Mad About You received various nominations, including Best Television Series – Musical or Comedy and Best Actress – Television Series Musical or Comedy for Helen Hunt.

Year	Category	Nominee(s)	Result	Ref.
1996	Best Actress in a Television Series – Musical or Comedy	Helen Hunt	Nominated	
1997	Best Television Series – Musical or Comedy		Nominated	
1997	Best Actress in a Television Series – Musical or Comedy	Helen Hunt	Nominated	
1998	Best Television Series – Musical or Comedy		Nominated	
1998	Best Actress in a Television Series – Musical or Comedy	Helen Hunt	Nominated	
1998	Best Actor in a Television Series – Musical or Comedy	Paul Reiser	Nominated	

== Screen Actors Guild Awards ==
The Screen Actors Guild Award is an annual accolade presented by the Screen Actors Guild‐American Federation of Television and Radio Artists (SAG-AFTRA) for outstanding individual and ensemble performances in film and television. Helen Hunt won the award for Outstanding Performance by a Female Actor in a Comedy Series in 1995 while receiving nominations for the award in 1996, 1997 and 1998. The cast of Mad About received nominations for Outstanding Performance by an Ensemble in a Comedy Series from 1995-1998.

Year	Category	Nominee(s)	Result	Ref.
1994	Outstanding Performance by a Male Actor in a Comedy Series	Paul Reiser	Nominated	
1994	Outstanding Performance by a Female Actor in a Comedy Series	Helen Hunt	Won	
1994	Outstanding Performance by an Ensemble in a Comedy Series	Helen Hunt, Leila Kenzle, Richard Kind, Lisa Kudrow, John Pankow, Anne Ramsay, and Paul Reiser	Nominated	
1995	Outstanding Performance by a Male Actor in a Comedy Series	Paul Reiser	Nominated	
1995	Outstanding Performance by a Female Actor in a Comedy Series	Helen Hunt	Nominated	
1995	Outstanding Performance by an Ensemble in a Comedy Series	Helen Hunt, Leila Kenzle, John Pankow, Anne Ramsay, and Paul Reiser	Nominated	
1996	Outstanding Performance by a Female Actor in a Comedy Series	Helen Hunt	Nominated	
1996	Outstanding Performance by an Ensemble in a Comedy Series	Helen Hunt, Leila Kenzle, John Pankow, Anne Ramsay, and Paul Reiser	Nominated	
1997	Outstanding Performance by a Female Actor in a Comedy Series	Helen Hunt	Nominated	
1997	Outstanding Performance by an Ensemble in a Comedy Series	Robin Bartlett, Cynthia Harris, Helen Hunt, Leila Kenzle, John Pankow, Anne Ramsay, and Paul Reiser	Nominated	

== Viewers for Quality Television Awards ==
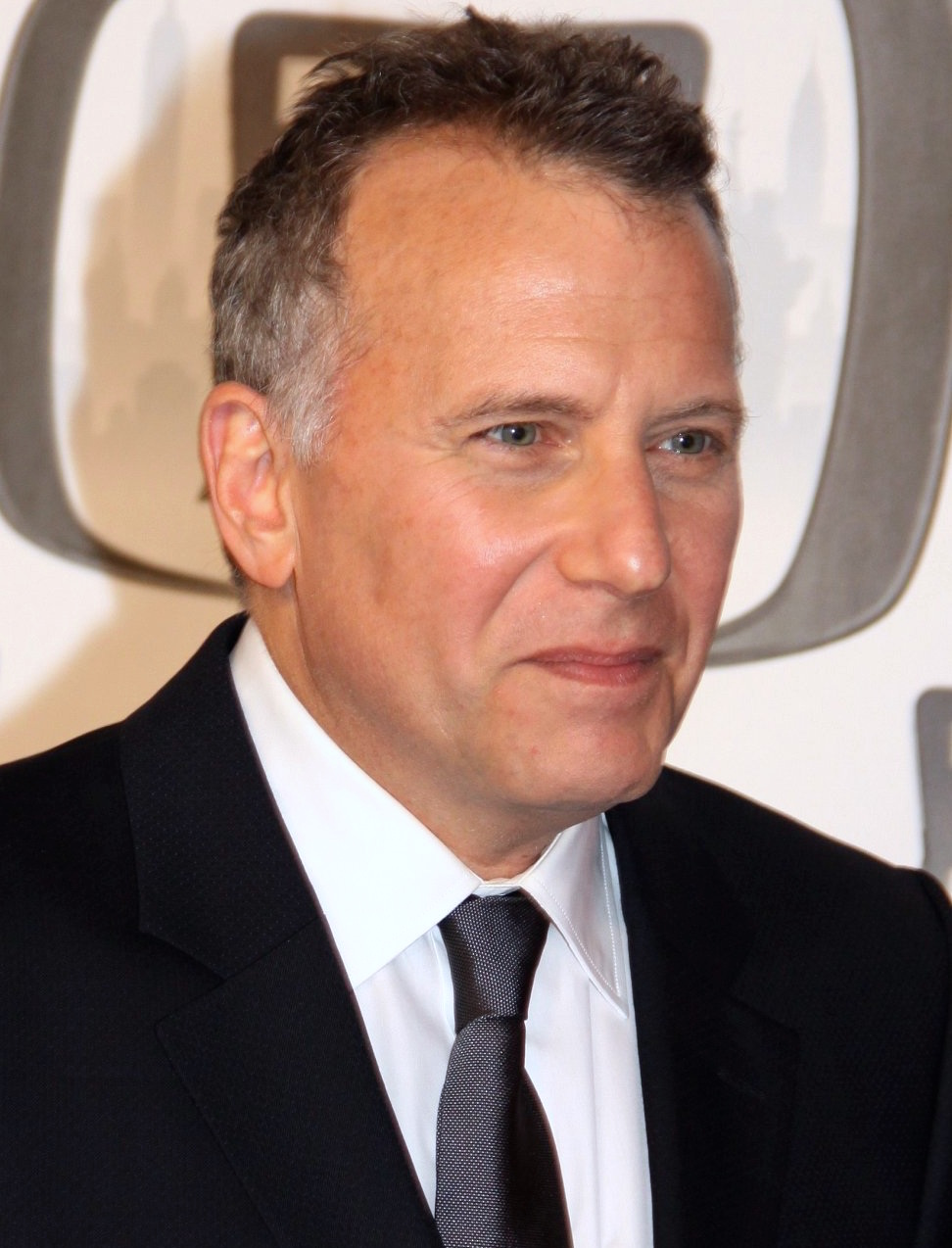
Paul Reiser won a Q Award for his performance as Paul Buchman and received nominations for the award in 1993, 1995-1998

The Q Award, presented by the Viewers for Quality Television, honors programs and performers that the organization deem are of the highest quality. Out of 17 nominations, Mad About You won five awards, including Best Quality Comedy Series in 1994; Best Actress in a Quality Comedy Series for Helen Hunt in 1994, 1996 and 1997; and Best Actor in a Quality Comedy Series for Paul Reiser in 1994.

Year	Category	Nominee(s)	Result	Ref.
1993	Best Quality Comedy Series		Nominated	
1993	Best Actor in a Quality Comedy Series	Paul Reiser	Nominated	
1993	Best Actress in a Quality Comedy Series	Helen Hunt	Nominated	
1994	Best Quality Comedy Series		Won	
1994	Best Actor in a Quality Comedy Series	Paul Reiser	Won	
1994	Best Actress in a Quality Comedy Series	Helen Hunt	Won	
1995	Best Quality Comedy Series		Nominated	
1995	Best Actor in a Quality Comedy Series	Paul Reiser	Nominated	
1995	Best Actress in a Quality Comedy Series	Helen Hunt	Nominated	
1996	Best Quality Comedy Series		Nominated	
1996	Best Actor in a Quality Comedy Series	Paul Reiser	Nominated	
1996	Best Actress in a Quality Comedy Series	Helen Hunt	Won	
1997	Best Quality Comedy Series		Nominated	
1997	Best Actor in a Quality Comedy Series	Paul Reiser	Nominated	
1997	Best Actress in a Quality Comedy Series	Helen Hunt	Won	
1998	Best Actor in a Quality Comedy Series	Paul Reiser	Nominated	
1998	Best Actress in a Quality Comedy Series	Helen Hunt	Nominated	

== Other awards ==
Association	Year	Category	Nominee	Result	Ref.
American Television Awards	1993	Best Actress in a Situation Comedy	Helen Hunt	Nominated	
ASCAP	1993	Top TV Series	Don Was	Won	
Artios Awards	1998	Outstanding Achievement in Casting – Comedy Episodic	Bonnie Zane	Nominated	
BMI Film & TV Awards	1995	BMI TV Music Award	Paul Reiser and David Kitay	Won	
BMI Film & TV Awards	1997	BMI TV Music Award	Paul Reiser and David Kitay	Won	
BMI Film & TV Awards	1998	BMI TV Music Award	Paul Reiser and David Kitay	Won	
Directors Guild of America	1995	Outstanding Directorial Achievement in Comedy Series	Gordon Hunt for "The Alan Brady Show"	Won	
Directors Guild of America	1996	Outstanding Directorial Achievement in Comedy Series	David Steinberg for "The Finale" (Parts 2 & 3)	Nominated	
Directors Guild of America	1997	Outstanding Directorial Achievement in Comedy Series	Gordon Hunt for "The Birth"	Nominated	
GLAAD Media Awards	1997	Outstanding TV Comedy Series		Nominated	
GLAAD Media Awards	1998	Outstanding TV Comedy Series		Nominated	
Hollywood Makeup Artist and Hair Stylist Guild	2000	Best Contemporary Hair Styling – Television (for a Single Episode of a Regular Series – Sitcom, Drama or Daytime)	Jonathan Hanousek, Darrell Redleaf-Fielder and Joy Zapata for "The Final Frontier"	Won	
Peabody Awards	1994	NBC, In Front Productions, Nuance Productions, in association with TriStar Television		Won	
Television Critics Association	1995	Outstanding Achievement in Comedy		Nominated	
TV Guide Awards	1999	Favorite Actress in a Comedy	Helen Hunt	Nominated	
Writers Guild of America	1995	Television: Episodic Comedy	Jack Burditt for "Our Fifteen Minutes"	Nominated	
Writers Guild of America	1995	Television: Episodic Comedy	Liz Coe for "The Ride Home"	Nominated	
