= 15th TCA Awards =

US television awards ceremony in 1999

- Date: July 23, 1999
- Venue: Ritz-Carlton Huntington Hotel and Spa, Pasadena, California

Highlights
- Program of the Year: The Sopranos
- Outstanding New Program: The Sopranos

The 15th TCA Awards were presented by the Television Critics Association in a ceremony hosted by Craig Kilborn that was held on July 23, 1999, at the Ritz-Carlton Huntington Hotel and Spa in Pasadena, Calif.

== Winners and nominees ==
Category	Winner	Other Nominees
Program of the Year	The Sopranos (HBO)	Everybody Loves Raymond (CBS); The Farmer's Wife (PBS); NYPD Blue (ABC); The Practice (ABC); Sports Night (ABC)
Outstanding Achievement in Comedy	Sports Night (ABC)	Ally McBeal (Fox); Everybody Loves Raymond (CBS); Friends (NBC); Will & Grace (NBC)
Outstanding Achievement in Drama	The Sopranos (HBO)	Homicide: Life on the Street (NBC); Law & Order (NBC); NYPD Blue (ABC); The Practice (ABC)
Outstanding Achievement in Movies, Miniseries and Specials	Joan of Arc (CBS)	Alice in Wonderland (NBC); The Farmer's Wife (PBS); Horatio Hornblower (A&E); Shot Through the Heart (HBO)
Outstanding New Program of the Year	The Sopranos (HBO)	Cupid (ABC); Felicity (The WB); It's Like, You Know... (ABC); Sports Night (ABC); Will & Grace (NBC)
Individual Achievement in Comedy	Ray Romano - Everybody Loves Raymond (CBS)	Calista Flockhart - Ally McBeal (Fox); Kelsey Grammer - Frasier (NBC); Matt Groening - The Simpsons and Futurama (Fox); Sean Hayes - Will & Grace (NBC); Megan Mullally - Will & Grace (NBC)
Individual Achievement in Drama	James Gandolfini - The Sopranos (HBO) and David E. Kelley - The Practice (ABC)	David Chase - The Sopranos (HBO); Dennis Franz - NYPD Blue (ABC); Camryn Manheim - The Practice (ABC); Dylan McDermott - The Practice (ABC)
Outstanding Achievement in Children's Programming	Blue's Clues (Nickelodeon)	Arthur (PBS); Bear in the Big Blue House (Disney Channel); Teletubbies (PBS); Wishbone (PBS)
Outstanding Achievement in News and Information	Cold War (CNN)	60 Minutes (CBS); The American Experience (PBS); The Century (ABC/The History Channel); The Farmer's Wife (PBS)
Career Achievement Award	Norman Lear	Dick Clark; Don Hewitt; David E. Kelley; Aaron Spelling; Barbara Walters

=== Multiple wins ===
The following shows received multiple wins:

Wins	Recipient
4	The Sopranos

=== Multiple nominations ===
The following shows received multiple nominations:

Nominations	Recipient
5	The Practice
5	The Sopranos
4	Will & Grace
3	Everybody Loves Raymond
3	The Farmer's Wife
3	NYPD Blue
3	Sports Night
2	Ally McBeal
