= 17th TCA Awards =

US television awards ceremony in 2001

- Date: July 21, 2001
- Venue: Ritz-Carlton Huntington Hotel and Spa, Pasadena, California

Highlights
- Program of the Year: The Sopranos
- Outstanding New Program: Gilmore Girls

The 17th TCA Awards were presented by the Television Critics Association. Christopher Titus hosted the ceremony on July 21, 2001 at the Ritz-Carlton Huntington Hotel and Spa in Pasadena, Calif.

== Winners and nominees ==
Category	Winner	Other Nominees
Program of the Year	The Sopranos (HBO)	Buffy the Vampire Slayer (The WB); Gilmore Girls (The WB); Survivor (CBS); The West Wing (NBC)
Outstanding Achievement in Comedy	Malcolm in the Middle (Fox)	Ed (NBC); Everybody Loves Raymond (CBS); The Job (ABC); Sex and the City (HBO)
Outstanding Achievement in Drama	The Sopranos (HBO) and The West Wing (NBC)	Buffy the Vampire Slayer (The WB); CSI: Crime Scene Investigation (CBS); Gilmore Girls (The WB)
Outstanding Achievement in Movies, Miniseries and Specials	Life with Judy Garland: Me and My Shadows (ABC)	61* (HBO); Anne Frank (ABC); Horatio Hornblower (A&E); Wit (HBO)
Outstanding New Program of the Year	Gilmore Girls (The WB)	CSI: Crime Scene Investigation (CBS); Ed (NBC); The Job (ABC); Survivor (CBS)
Individual Achievement in Comedy	Jane Kaczmarek - Malcolm in the Middle (Fox)	Bryan Cranston - Malcolm in the Middle (Fox); Robert Downey Jr. - Ally McBeal (Fox); Chris Isaak - The Chris Isaak Show (Showtime); Ray Romano - Everybody Loves Raymond (CBS)
Individual Achievement in Drama	James Gandolfini - The Sopranos (HBO)	Edie Falco - The Sopranos (HBO); Sarah Michelle Gellar - Buffy the Vampire Slayer (The WB); Chi McBride - Boston Public (Fox); Martin Sheen - The West Wing (NBC)
Outstanding Achievement in Children's Programming	Between the Lions (PBS) and Sesame Street (PBS)	Blue's Clues (Nickelodeon); Dora the Explorer (Nickelodeon); Rugrats (Nickelodeon)
Outstanding Achievement in News and Information	Jazz (PBS)	60 Minutes (CBS); America Undercover (HBO); Frontline (PBS); On Our Own Terms: Moyers on Dying (PBS)
Career Achievement Award	Sid Caesar	Milton Berle; David Letterman; Mary Tyler Moore; Barbara Walters

=== Multiple wins ===
The following shows received multiple wins:

Wins	Recipient
3	The Sopranos
2	Malcolm in the Middle

=== Multiple nominations ===
The following shows received multiple nominations:

Nominations	Recipient
4	The Sopranos
3	Buffy the Vampire Slayer
3	Gilmore Girls
3	Malcolm in the Middle
3	The West Wing
2	CSI: Crime Scene Investigation
2	Ed
2	Everybody Loves Raymond
2	The Job
2	Survivor
