= 40th TCA Awards =

2024 television award ceremony

- Date: July 12, 2024
- Venue: The Langham Huntington, Pasadena, California
- Hosted by: Wendi McLendon-Covey

Highlights
- Program of the Year: Shōgun
- Outstanding New Program: Shōgun

The 40th TCA Awards were presented on July 12, 2024, at The Langham Huntington in Pasadena, California. With Wendi McLendon-Covey hosting the event, making it five years since the TCA have a host. The nominees were announced by the Television Critics Association on June 10, 2024.

== Winners and nominees ==
Category	Winner	Nominees
Program of the Year	Shōgun (FX)	Baby Reindeer (Netflix); The Bear (FX); Hacks (HBO / Max); Reservation Dogs (FX); Ripley (Netflix)
Outstanding Achievement in Comedy	Hacks (HBO / Max)	Abbott Elementary (ABC); The Bear (FX); Girls5eva (Netflix); Reservation Dogs (FX); We Are Lady Parts (Peacock)
Outstanding Achievement in Drama	Shōgun (FX)	Baby Reindeer (Netflix); Fallout (Prime Video); Fargo (FX); Ripley (Netflix); True Detective: Night Country (HBO / Max)
Outstanding Achievement in Movies, Miniseries or Specials	Baby Reindeer (Netflix)	The Fall of the House of Usher (Netflix); Fargo (FX); Fellow Travelers (Showtime); Ripley (Netflix); The Sympathizer (HBO / Max)
Outstanding New Program	Shōgun (FX)	Baby Reindeer (Netflix); Fallout (Prime Video); Mr. & Mrs. Smith (Prime Video); Ripley (Netflix); X-Men '97 (Disney+)
Individual Achievement in Comedy	Jean Smart – Hacks (HBO / Max)	Quinta Brunson – Abbott Elementary (ABC); Ayo Edebiri – The Bear (FX); Renée Elise Goldsberry – Girls5eva (Netflix); Devery Jacobs – Reservation Dogs (FX); Jeremy Allen White – The Bear (FX)
Individual Achievement in Drama	Anna Sawai – Shōgun (FX)	Jodie Foster – True Detective: Night Country (HBO / Max); Richard Gadd – Baby Reindeer (Netflix); Hiroyuki Sanada – Shōgun (FX); Andrew Scott – Ripley (Netflix); Juno Temple – Fargo (FX)
Outstanding Achievement in News and Information	Quiet on Set: The Dark Side of Kids TV (Investigation Discovery)	America Outdoors with Baratunde Thurston (PBS); Frontline (PBS); The Jinx: Part Two (HBO / Max); Queens (National Geographic); Telemarketers (HBO / Max)
Outstanding Achievement in Variety, Talk or Sketch	John Mulaney Presents: Everybody's in LA (Netflix)	The Daily Show (Comedy Central); Jimmy Kimmel Live! (ABC); Last Week Tonight with John Oliver (HBO / Max); Late Night with Seth Meyers (NBC); Saturday Night Live (NBC)
Outstanding Achievement in Reality	The Traitors (Peacock)	The Amazing Race (CBS); Conan O'Brien Must Go (HBO / Max); Jerrod Carmichael Reality Show (HBO / Max); Top Chef (Bravo); We're Here (HBO / Max); Welcome to Wrexham (FX)
Outstanding Achievement in Family Programming	Doctor Who (Disney+)	Heartstopper (Netflix); My Adventures with Superman (Adult Swim); Percy Jackson and the Olympians (Disney+); Renegade Nell (Disney+); X-Men '97 (Disney+)
Outstanding Achievement in Children's Programming	Bluey (Disney+)	Daniel Tiger's Neighborhood (PBS Kids); Frog and Toad (Apple TV+); Pokémon Concierge (Netflix); Sesame Street (HBO / Max); Snoopy Presents: Welcome Home, Franklin (Apple TV+)
Heritage Award	Twin Peaks (ABC)	
Career Achievement Award	Andre Braugher	

=== Shows with multiple nominations ===
The following shows received multiple nominations:

Nominations	Recipient	Category	Network/Platform
5	Baby Reindeer	Drama	Netflix
5	Ripley	Drama	Netflix
5	Shōgun	Drama	FX
4	The Bear	Comedy	FX
3	Fargo	Drama	FX
3	Hacks	Comedy	HBO / Max
3	Reservation Dogs	Comedy	FX
2	Fallout	Drama	Prime Video
2	Girls5eva	Comedy	Netflix
2	True Detective: Night Country	Drama	HBO / Max
2	X-Men '97	Family	Disney+

=== Shows with multiple wins ===
The following shows received multiple wins:

Wins	Recipient	Category	Network/Platform
4	Shōgun	Drama	FX
2	Hacks	Comedy	HBO / Max
