= TCA Career Achievement Award =

Annual US television award

The TCA Career Achievement Award is an award given by the Television Critics Association. The Career Achievement Award annually honors an individual who has inspired his or her work in television. In 2014, director James Burrows became the 30th recipient of the award.

== Winners and nominees ==
| Year | Winner | Other nominees |
|---|---|---|
| 1984–1985 (1st) | Grant Tinker | n/a |
| 1985–1986 (2nd) | Walter Cronkite | Roone Arledge; Bill Moyers; Brandon Tartikoff; David L. Wolper |
| 1986–1987 (3rd) | Hill Street Blues (NBC) | David Brinkley; Ted Koppel; Bill Moyers; Brandon Tartikoff |
| 1987–1988 (4th) | David Brinkley | Jim Henson |
| 1988–1989 (5th) | Lucille Ball | Roone Arledge; Dan Curtis; Jim Henson; Brandon Stoddard |
| 1989–1990 (6th) | Jim Henson | Roone Arledge; Carol Burnett; Bob Newhart; Ted Turner |
| 1990–1991 (7th) | Brandon Tartikoff | Roone Arledge; Bill Moyers; Ted Turner |
| 1991–1992 (8th) | Johnny Carson | Roone Arledge; Steven Bochco; Joshua Brand & John Falsey; Peggy Charren; Ted Turner |
| 1992–1993 (9th) | Bob Hope | Roone Arledge; David Letterman; Bill Moyers; Fred Rogers |
| 1993–1994 (10th) | Charles Kuralt | Roone Arledge; Steven Bochco; David Letterman; Ted Turner |
| 1994–1995 (11th) | Ted Turner | Roone Arledge; Steven Bochco; David Letterman; Bill Moyers |
| 1995–1996 (12th) | Angela Lansbury | Roone Arledge; Steven Bochco; Mike Wallace; Barbara Walters |
| 1996–1997 (13th) | Fred Rogers | Roone Arledge; Steven Bochco; Bill Cosby; Jack Paar; Roseanne (ABC) |
| 1997–1998 (14th) | Roone Arledge | Candice Bergen; Steven Bochco; Don Hewitt; David E. Kelley; Jerry Seinfeld |
| 1998–1999 (15th) | Norman Lear | Dick Clark; Don Hewitt; David E. Kelley; Aaron Spelling; Barbara Walters |
| 1999–2000 (16th) | Dick Van Dyke | Mary Tyler Moore; Aaron Spelling; Mike Wallace; Dick Wolf |
| 2000–2001 (17th) | Sid Caesar | Milton Berle; David Letterman; Mary Tyler Moore; Barbara Walters |
| 2001–2002 (18th) | Bill Cosby (rescinded in 2018)) | Carol Burnett; Larry Gelbart; Aaron Spelling; Mike Wallace |
| 2002–2003 (19th) | Carl Reiner | Larry Gelbart; Don Hewitt; Aaron Spelling; Oprah Winfrey |
| 2003–2004 (20th) | Don Hewitt | No other nominees |
| 2004–2005 (21st) | Bob Newhart | No other nominees |
| 2005–2006 (22nd) | Carol Burnett | No other nominees |
| 2006–2007 (23rd) | Mary Tyler Moore | No other nominees |
| 2007–2008 (24th) | Lorne Michaels | James Garner; Bill Moyers; William Shatner; Mike Wallace |
| 2008–2009 (25th) | Betty White | No other nominees |
| 2009–2010 (26th) | James Garner | Bill Moyers; Sherwood Schwartz; William Shatner; Dick Wolf |
| 2010–2011 (27th) | Oprah Winfrey | Steven Bochco; Dick Ebersol; Cloris Leachman; David Letterman; William Shatner |
| 2011–2012 (28th) | David Letterman | Dick Clark; Andy Griffith; Regis Philbin; William Shatner |
| 2012–2013 (29th) | Barbara Walters | James L. Brooks; James Burrows; Jay Leno; William Shatner |
| 2013–2014 (30th) | James Burrows | Mark Burnett; Valerie Harper; Jay Leno; William Shatner |
| 2014–2015 (31st) | James L. Brooks | No other nominees |
| 2015–2016 (32nd) | Lily Tomlin | No other nominees |
| 2016–2017 (33rd) | Ken Burns | No other nominees |
| 2017–2018 (34th) | Rita Moreno | No other nominees |
| 2018–2019 (35th) | David Milch | No other nominees |
| 2019–2020 (36th) | Alex Trebek | No other nominees |
| 2020–2021 (37th) | Jean Smart | No other nominees |
| 2021–2022 (38th) | Ted Danson and Steve Martin | No other nominees |
| 2022–2023 (39th) | Mel Brooks | No other nominees |
| 2023–2024 (40th) | Andre Braugher | No other nominees |
| 2024–2025 (41st) | Kathy Bates | No other nominees |
| 2025–2026 (42nd) | Stephen Colbert | No other nominees |
