= 20th TCA Awards =

US television awards ceremony in 2004

- Date: July 17, 2004
- Venue: Century Plaza Hotel

Highlights
- Program of the Year: Angels in America
- Outstanding New Program: Arrested Development

The 20th TCA Awards were presented by the Television Critics Association. Bill Maher hosted the ceremony on July 17, 2004, at the Century Plaza Hotel.

== Winners and nominees ==
Category	Winner	Other Nominees
Program of the Year	Angels in America (HBO)	The Apprentice (NBC); Arrested Development (Fox); The Daily Show with Jon Stewart (Comedy Central); The Sopranos (HBO)
Outstanding Achievement in Comedy	Arrested Development (Fox)	Curb Your Enthusiasm (HBO); The Daily Show with Jon Stewart (Comedy Central); The Office (BBC America); Sex and the City (HBO)
Outstanding Achievement in Drama	The Sopranos (HBO)	24 (Fox); Deadwood (HBO); The Shield (FX); The Wire (HBO)
Outstanding Achievement in Movies, Miniseries and Specials	Angels in America (HBO)	The Lion in Winter (Showtime); Prime Suspect 6: The Last Witness (PBS); Soldier's Girl (Showtime); State of Play (BBC America)
Outstanding New Program of the Year	Arrested Development (Fox)	Deadwood (HBO); Joan of Arcadia (CBS); The O.C. (Fox); Wonderfalls (Fox)
Individual Achievement in Comedy	Ricky Gervais - The Office (BBC America)	Jason Bateman - Arrested Development (Fox); Larry David - Curb Your Enthusiasm (HBO); Jon Stewart - The Daily Show with Jon Stewart (Comedy Central); Jeffrey Tambor - Arrested Development (Fox)
Individual Achievement in Drama	Ian McShane - Deadwood (HBO)	Edie Falco - The Sopranos (HBO); James Gandolfini - The Sopranos (HBO); Al Pacino - Angels in America (HBO); Kiefer Sutherland - 24 (Fox)
Outstanding Achievement in Children's Programming	Nick News with Linda Ellerbee (Nickelodeon)	Dora the Explorer (Nickelodeon); The Fairly OddParents (Nickelodeon); The Proud Family (Disney Channel); Sesame Street (PBS)
Outstanding Achievement in News and Information	The Daily Show with Jon Stewart (Comedy Central)	60 Minutes (CBS); Frontline (PBS); Meet the Press (NBC); Nightline (ABC)
Heritage Award	60 Minutes (CBS)	Frasier (NBC); Friends (NBC); Frontline (PBS); Saturday Night Live (NBC)
Career Achievement Award	Don Hewitt	No other nominees

=== Multiple wins ===
The following shows received multiple wins:

Wins	Recipient
2	Angels in America
2	Arrested Development

=== Multiple nominations ===
The following shows received multiple nominations:

Nominations	Recipient
5	Arrested Development
4	The Daily Show with Jon Stewart
4	The Sopranos
3	Angels in America
3	Deadwood
2	24
2	60 Minutes
2	Curb Your Enthusiasm
2	Frontline
2	The Office
