= 29th TCA Awards =

2013 Television Critics Award

- Date: August 3, 2013
- Venue: Beverly Hilton Hotel
- Hosted by: Keegan-Michael Key and Jordan Peele

Highlights
- Program of the Year: Breaking Bad
- Outstanding New Program: The Americans
- Website: http://tvcritics.org/tca-awards/

The nominees for the 29th TCA Awards were announced by the Television Critics Association on June 10, 2013. Winners were announced on August 3, 2013, at the Beverly Hilton Hotel in a ceremony hosted by Keegan-Michael Key and Jordan Peele.

== Winners and nominees ==
Category	Winner	Other Nominees
Program of the Year	Breaking Bad (AMC)	The Americans (FX); Game of Thrones (HBO); House of Cards (Netflix); The Walking Dead (AMC)
Outstanding Achievement in Comedy	The Big Bang Theory (CBS) and Parks and Recreation (NBC)	Louie (FX); New Girl (Fox); Veep (HBO)
Outstanding Achievement in Drama	Game of Thrones (HBO)	The Americans (FX); Breaking Bad (AMC); Homeland (Showtime); Mad Men (AMC)
Outstanding Achievement in Movies, Miniseries and Specials	Behind the Candelabra (HBO)	American Horror Story: Asylum (FX); Downton Abbey (PBS); Rectify (Sundance Channel); Top of the Lake (Sundance Channel)
Outstanding New Program	The Americans (FX)	Elementary (CBS); House of Cards (Netflix); The Mindy Project (Fox); Orphan Black (BBC America)
Individual Achievement in Comedy	Louis C.K. - Louie (FX)	Lena Dunham - Girls (HBO); Jake Johnson - New Girl (Fox); Julia Louis-Dreyfus - Veep (HBO); Amy Poehler - Parks and Recreation (NBC)
Individual Achievement in Drama	Tatiana Maslany - Orphan Black (BBC America)	Bryan Cranston - Breaking Bad (AMC); Vera Farmiga - Bates Motel (A&E); Monica Potter - Parenthood (NBC); Matthew Rhys - The Americans (FX)
Outstanding Achievement in Youth Programming	Bunheads (ABC Family)	Adventure Time (Cartoon Network); Daniel Tiger's Neighborhood (PBS); Sesame Street (PBS); Switched at Birth (ABC Family)
Outstanding Achievement in News and Information	The Central Park Five (PBS)	60 Minutes (CBS); Anderson Cooper 360° (CNN); The Daily Show with Jon Stewart (Comedy Central); The Rachel Maddow Show (MSNBC)
Outstanding Achievement in Reality Programming	Shark Tank (ABC)	The Amazing Race (CBS); The Glee Project (Oxygen); Survivor (CBS); The Voice (NBC)
Heritage Award	All in the Family (CBS)	Lost (ABC); Saturday Night Live (NBC); Star Trek (NBC); Twin Peaks (ABC)
Career Achievement Award	Barbara Walters	James L. Brooks; James Burrows; Jay Leno; William Shatner

=== Multiple nominations ===
The following shows received multiple nominations:

Nominations	Recipient
4	The Americans
3	Breaking Bad
2	Game of Thrones
2	House of Cards
2	Louie
2	New Girl
2	Orphan Black
2	Parks and Recreation
2	Veep
