= TCA Award for Outstanding Achievement in Sports =

Annual US television award

The TCA Award for Outstanding Achievement in Sports was an award given by the Television Critics Association from 1985 to 1997.

== Winners and nominees ==
Year	Winner	Other Nominees
1984-1985 (1st)	1984 Summer Olympics (ABC)	n/a
1985-1986 (2nd)	No award given	1985 World Series (ABC); Roone Arledge; John Madden; Monday Night Football (ABC); Wide World of Sports (ABC)
1986-1987 (3rd)	1987 America's Cup (ESPN)	n/a
1987-1988 (4th)	1988 Winter Olympics (ABC)	Bob Costas
1988-1989 (5th)	1988 Summer Olympics (NBC)	1988 World Series (NBC); NBA on CBS (CBS); SportsCenter (ESPN)
1989-1990 (6th)	1989 World Series (ABC)	1990 Kentucky Derby (ABC); Mike Tyson vs. Buster Douglas (HBO); SportsCenter (ESPN)
1990-1991 (7th)	1991 NCAA Final Four (CBS)	Super Bowl XXV (ABC); Baseball Tonight (ESPN); SportsCenter (ESPN)
1991-1992 (8th)	When It Was a Game (HBO)	1991 World Series (CBS); 1992 Masters Tournament (CBS); 1992 Winter Olympics (CBS)
1992-1993 (9th)	Bob Costas	1992 World Series (CBS); ESPN Major League Baseball (ESPN); SportsCenter (ESPN)
1993-1994 (10th)	1994 Winter Olympics (CBS)	1993 World Series (CBS); 1994 NCAA Final Four (CBS); Baseball Tonight (ESPN); SportsCenter (ESPN)
1994-1995 (11th)	Baseball (PBS)	1995 NCAA Final Four (CBS); Bob Costas; HBO Boxing (HBO); SportsCenter (ESPN)
1995-1996 (12th)	SportsCenter (ESPN)	Baseball Tonight (ESPN); ESPN National Hockey Night (ESPN/ESPN2); NFL on Fox (Fox); Outside the Lines (ESPN); Real Sports with Bryant Gumbel (HBO)
1996-1997 (13th)	SportsCenter (ESPN)	1996 World Series (Fox); 1997 Masters Tournament (CBS); Monday Night Football (ABC); Real Sports with Bryant Gumbel (HBO)
