= 14th TCA Awards =

US television awards ceremony in 1998

- Date: July 18, 1998
- Venue: Ritz-Carlton Huntington Hotel and Spa, Pasadena, California

Highlights
- Program of the Year: From the Earth to the Moon
- Outstanding New Program: Ally McBeal

The 14th TCA Awards were presented by the Television Critics Association in a ceremony hosted by Ray Romano held on July 18, 1998, at the Ritz-Carlton Huntington Hotel and Spa in Pasadena, Calif.

== Winners and nominees ==
Category	Winner	Other Nominees
Program of the Year	From the Earth to the Moon (HBO)	Ally McBeal (Fox); Homicide: Life on the Street (NBC); Nothing Sacred (ABC); South Park (Comedy Central)
Outstanding Achievement in Comedy	The Larry Sanders Show (HBO)	Ally McBeal (Fox); Everybody Loves Raymond (CBS); Frasier (NBC); Seinfeld (NBC)
Outstanding Achievement in Drama	Homicide: Life on the Street (NBC)	ER (NBC); Law & Order (NBC); The Practice (ABC); The X-Files (Fox)
Outstanding Achievement in Movies, Miniseries and Specials	From the Earth to the Moon (HBO)	Don King: Only in America (HBO); Merlin (NBC); Moby Dick (USA); Tom Jones (A&E); What the Deaf Man Heard (CBS)
Outstanding New Program of the Year	Ally McBeal (Fox)	Dawson's Creek (The WB); Dharma & Greg (ABC); Nothing Sacred (ABC); South Park (Comedy Central)
Individual Achievement in Comedy	David Hyde Pierce - Frasier (NBC)	Jenna Elfman - Dharma & Greg (ABC); Calista Flockhart - Ally McBeal (Fox); Michael Richards - Seinfeld (NBC); Jerry Seinfeld - Seinfeld (NBC)
Individual Achievement in Drama	Andre Braugher - Homicide: Life on the Street (NBC)	Kevin Anderson - Nothing Sacred (ABC); Anthony Edwards - ER (NBC); Dennis Franz - NYPD Blue (ABC); Kyle Secor - Homicide: Life on the Street (NBC)
Outstanding Achievement in Children's Programming	Blue's Clues (Nickelodeon)	Nick News with Linda Ellerbee (Nickelodeon); Science Court (ABC); Teletubbies (PBS); Wishbone (PBS)
Outstanding Achievement in News and Information	The American Experience (PBS)	60 Minutes (CBS); Dateline (NBC); Frontline (PBS); Nightline (ABC)
Career Achievement Award	Roone Arledge	Candice Bergen; Steven Bochco; Don Hewitt; David E. Kelley; Jerry Seinfeld

=== Multiple wins ===
The following shows received multiple wins:

Wins	Recipient
2	From the Earth to the Moon
2	Homicide: Life on the Street

=== Multiple nominations ===
The following shows received multiple nominations:

Nominations	Recipient
4	Ally McBeal
4	Homicide: Life on the Street
3	Nothing Sacred
3	Seinfeld
2	Dharma & Greg
2	ER
2	Frasier
2	From the Earth to the Moon
2	South Park
