= 31st TCA Awards =

US television awards ceremony in 2015

- Date: August 8, 2015
- Venue: The Beverly Hilton, Beverly Hills, California
- Hosted by: James Corden

Highlights
- Program of the Year: Empire
- Outstanding New Program: Better Call Saul

The 31st TCA Awards were held on August 8, 2015, in a ceremony hosted by James Corden at The Beverly Hilton in Beverly Hills, California. The nominees were announced by the Television Critics Association on June 4, 2015.

== Winners and nominees ==
Category	Winner	Nominees
Program of the Year	Empire (Fox)	The Americans (FX); Game of Thrones (HBO); Mad Men (AMC); Transparent (Amazon)
Outstanding Achievement in Comedy	Inside Amy Schumer (Comedy Central)	The Big Bang Theory (CBS); Jane the Virgin (The CW); Transparent (Amazon); Unbreakable Kimmy Schmidt (Netflix)
Outstanding Achievement in Drama	The Americans (FX)	Empire (Fox); Game of Thrones (HBO); Justified (FX); Mad Men (AMC)
Outstanding Achievement in Movies, Miniseries and Specials	The Jinx (HBO)	Bessie (HBO); The Honourable Woman (SundanceTV); Olive Kitteridge (HBO); Wolf Hall (PBS)
Outstanding New Program	Better Call Saul (AMC)	Empire (Fox); The Flash (The CW); Jane the Virgin (The CW); Transparent (Amazon)
Individual Achievement in Comedy	Amy Schumer – Inside Amy Schumer (Comedy Central)	Julia Louis-Dreyfus – Veep (HBO); Gina Rodriguez – Jane the Virgin (The CW); Jeffrey Tambor – Transparent (Amazon); Constance Wu – Fresh Off the Boat (ABC)
Individual Achievement in Drama	Jon Hamm – Mad Men (AMC)	Viola Davis – How to Get Away with Murder (ABC); Taraji P. Henson – Empire (Fox); Bob Odenkirk – Better Call Saul (AMC); Matthew Rhys – The Americans (FX)
Outstanding Achievement in News and Information	Last Week Tonight with John Oliver (HBO)	60 Minutes (CBS); CBS News Sunday Morning (CBS); The Daily Show with Jon Stewart (Comedy Central); Frontline (PBS)
Outstanding Achievement in Reality Programming	The Chair (Starz)	The Amazing Race (CBS); Dancing with the Stars (ABC); RuPaul's Drag Race (Logo TV); Shark Tank (ABC)
Outstanding Achievement in Youth Programming	The Fosters (ABC Family)	Daniel Tiger's Neighborhood (PBS); The Legend of Korra (Nickelodeon / Nick.com); Sesame Street (PBS); Switched at Birth (ABC Family)
Heritage Award	Late Night / Late Show with David Letterman (NBC / CBS)	Friends (NBC); The Shield (FX); Star Trek (NBC); Twin Peaks (ABC)
Career Achievement Award	James L. Brooks	No other nominees

=== Multiple wins ===
The following shows received multiple wins:

Wins	Recipient
2	Inside Amy Schumer

=== Shows with multiple nominations ===
The following shows received multiple nominations:

Nominations	Recipient
4	Empire
4	Transparent
3	The Americans
3	Jane the Virgin
3	Mad Men
2	Better Call Saul
2	Game of Thrones
2	Inside Amy Schumer
