= 32nd TCA Awards =

US television awards ceremony in 2016

- Date: August 6, 2016
- Venue: The Beverly Hilton, Beverly Hills, California
- Hosted by: Jaime Camil

Highlights
- Program of the Year: The People v. O. J. Simpson: American Crime Story
- Outstanding New Program: Mr. Robot

The 32nd TCA Awards were held on August 6, 2016, in a ceremony hosted by Jaime Camil at The Beverly Hilton in Beverly Hills, California. The nominees were announced by the Television Critics Association on June 22, 2016.

== Winners and nominees ==
Category	Winner	Nominees
Program of the Year	The People v. O. J. Simpson: American Crime Story (FX)	The Americans (FX); Fargo (FX); Game of Thrones (HBO); Making a Murderer (Netflix); Mr. Robot (USA); UnREAL (Lifetime)
Outstanding Achievement in Comedy	Black-ish (ABC)	Crazy Ex-Girlfriend (The CW); Master of None (Netflix); Silicon Valley (HBO); Veep (HBO); You're the Worst (FXX)
Outstanding Achievement in Drama	The Americans (FX)	Better Call Saul (AMC); Game of Thrones (HBO); The Leftovers (HBO); Mr. Robot (USA); UnREAL (Lifetime)
Outstanding Achievement in Movies, Miniseries and Specials	The People v. O. J. Simpson: American Crime Story (FX)	All the Way (HBO); Fargo (FX); The Night Manager (AMC); Roots (History); Show Me a Hero (HBO)
Outstanding New Program	Mr. Robot (USA)	Crazy Ex-Girlfriend (The CW); Marvel's Jessica Jones (Netflix); Master of None (Netflix); Underground (WGN America); UnREAL (Lifetime)
Individual Achievement in Comedy	Rachel Bloom – Crazy Ex-Girlfriend (The CW)	Aziz Ansari – Master of None (Netflix); Samantha Bee – Full Frontal with Samantha Bee (TBS); Aya Cash – You're the Worst (FXX); Julia Louis-Dreyfus – Veep (HBO); Constance Wu – Fresh Off the Boat (ABC)
Individual Achievement in Drama	Sarah Paulson – The People v. O. J. Simpson: American Crime Story (FX)	Bryan Cranston – All the Way (HBO); Rami Malek – Mr. Robot (USA); Bob Odenkirk – Better Call Saul (AMC); Keri Russell – The Americans (FX); Courtney B. Vance – The People v. O. J. Simpson: American Crime Story (FX)
Outstanding Achievement in News and Information	Full Frontal with Samantha Bee (TBS)	CBS News Sunday Morning (CBS); Jackie Robinson (PBS); Last Week Tonight with John Oliver (HBO); Real Time with Bill Maher (HBO); United Shades of America (CNN)
Outstanding Achievement in Reality Programming	Making a Murderer (Netflix)	The Circus: Inside the Greatest Political Show on Earth (Showtime); The Great British Baking Show (PBS); I Am Cait (E!); MasterChef Junior (Fox); Survivor Cambodia: Second Chance (CBS)
Outstanding Achievement in Youth Programming	Daniel Tiger's Neighborhood (PBS)	Doc McStuffins (Disney Junior); Nature Cat (PBS); Odd Squad (PBS); Sofia the First (Disney Junior)
Heritage Award	The Mary Tyler Moore Show (CBS)	The Larry Sanders Show (HBO); Seinfeld (NBC); Star Trek (NBC); Twin Peaks (ABC)
Career Achievement Award	Lily Tomlin	No other nominees

=== Multiple wins ===
The following shows received multiple wins:

Wins	Recipient
3	The People v. O. J. Simpson: American Crime Story

=== Shows with multiple nominations ===
The following shows received multiple nominations:

Nominations	Recipient
4	Mr. Robot
4	The People v. O. J. Simpson: American Crime Story
3	The Americans
3	Crazy Ex-Girlfriend
3	Master of None
3	UnREAL
2	All the Way
2	Better Call Saul
2	Fargo
2	Full Frontal with Samantha Bee
2	Game of Thrones
2	Making a Murderer
2	Veep
2	You're the Worst
