= 30th TCA Awards =

US television awards ceremony in 2014

- Date: July 19, 2014
- Venue: The Beverly Hilton, Beverly Hills, California, U.S.
- Hosted by: Terry Crews

Highlights
- Program of the Year: Breaking Bad
- Outstanding New Program: Orange Is the New Black

The 30th TCA Awards were held on July 19, 2014, in a ceremony hosted by Terry Crews at The Beverly Hilton in Beverly Hills, California. The Television Critics Association announced their nominees on May 27, 2014.

== Winners and nominees ==
Category	Winner	Nominees
Program of the Year	Breaking Bad (AMC)	Game of Thrones (HBO); The Good Wife (CBS); Orange Is the New Black (Netflix); True Detective (HBO)
Outstanding Achievement in Comedy	Louie (FX) (tie); Veep (HBO) (tie)	The Big Bang Theory (CBS); Brooklyn Nine-Nine (Fox); The Mindy Project (Fox)
Outstanding Achievement in Drama	The Good Wife (CBS)	The Americans (FX); Breaking Bad (AMC); Game of Thrones (HBO); House of Cards (Netflix)
Outstanding Achievement in Movies, Miniseries and Specials	True Detective (HBO)	American Horror Story: Coven (FX); Broadchurch (BBC America); Fargo (FX); The Returned (SundanceTV)
Outstanding New Program	Orange Is the New Black (Netflix)	Brooklyn Nine-Nine (Fox); Fargo (FX); Sleepy Hollow (Fox); True Detective (HBO)
Individual Achievement in Comedy	Julia Louis-Dreyfus - Veep (HBO)	Louis C.K. - Louie (FX); Mindy Kaling - The Mindy Project (Fox); Jim Parsons - The Big Bang Theory (CBS); Amy Poehler - Parks and Recreation (NBC)
Individual Achievement in Drama	Matthew McConaughey - True Detective (HBO)	Bryan Cranston - Breaking Bad (AMC); Julianna Margulies - The Good Wife (CBS); Tatiana Maslany - Orphan Black (BBC America); Matthew Rhys - The Americans (FX)
Outstanding Achievement in News and Information	Cosmos: A Spacetime Odyssey (Fox / National Geographic Channel)	60 Minutes (CBS); CBS News Sunday Morning (CBS); The Daily Show with Jon Stewart (Comedy Central); Frontline (PBS)
Outstanding Achievement in Reality Programming	RuPaul's Drag Race (Logo TV)	The Amazing Race (CBS); Shark Tank (ABC); Survivor (CBS); The Voice (NBC)
Outstanding Achievement in Youth Programming	The Fosters (ABC Family)	Adventure Time (Cartoon Network); Daniel Tiger's Neighborhood (PBS); Sesame Street (PBS); Switched at Birth (ABC Family)
Heritage Award	Saturday Night Live (NBC)	Lost (ABC); South Park (Comedy Central); Star Trek (NBC); Twin Peaks (ABC)
Career Achievement Award	James Burrows	Mark Burnett; Valerie Harper; Jay Leno; William Shatner

=== Multiple wins ===
The following shows received multiple wins:

Wins	Recipient
2	True Detective
2	Veep

=== Multiple nominations ===
The following shows received multiple nominations:

Nominations	Recipient
4	True Detective
3	Breaking Bad
3	The Good Wife
2	The Americans
2	The Big Bang Theory
2	Brooklyn Nine-Nine
2	Fargo
2	Game of Thrones
2	Louie
2	The Mindy Project
2	Orange Is the New Black
2	Veep
