= 1st TCA Awards =

US television awards ceremony in 1985

- Date: June 9, 1985
- Venue: The Century Plaza Hotel, Los Angeles, California

Highlights
- Program of the Year: The Jewel in the Crown

The 1st TCA Awards were presented by the Television Critics Association. The ceremony was held on June 9, 1985 at The Century Plaza Hotel in Los Angeles, California.

== Winners and nominees ==
Category	Winner	Other Nominees
Program of the Year	The Jewel in the Crown (PBS)	1984 Summer Olympics (ABC); The Burning Bed (NBC); Cheers (NBC); The Cosby Show (NBC); Fatal Vision (NBC); Miami Vice (NBC); St. Elsewhere (NBC)
Outstanding Achievement in Comedy	The Cosby Show (NBC)	Bill Cosby – The Cosby Show (NBC); Martin Short – Saturday Night Live (NBC); Brothers (Showtime); Cheers (NBC); Family Ties (NBC); Kate & Allie (CBS); Late Night with David Letterman (NBC); Newhart (CBS); Night Court (NBC); Not Necessarily the News (HBO)
Outstanding Achievement in Drama	The Jewel in the Crown (PBS)	Farrah Fawcett – The Burning Bed (NBC); American Playhouse (PBS); The Burning Bed (NBC); Cagney & Lacey (CBS); Call to Glory (ABC); Fatal Vision (NBC); Hill Street Blues (NBC); Miami Vice (NBC); St. Elsewhere (NBC)
Outstanding Achievement in Specials	The Burning Bed (NBC)	1984 Summer Olympics Opening Ceremony (ABC); Farrah Fawcett – The Burning Bed (NBC); Fatal Vision (NBC); Heartsounds (ABC); The Jewel in the Crown (PBS); Kenny & Dolly: A Christmas to Remember (CBS); Threads (PBS); Wallenberg: A Hero's Story (NBC)
Outstanding Achievement in Children's Programming	Faerie Tale Theatre (Showtime)	n/a
Outstanding Achievement in News and Information	Ted Koppel – Nightline (ABC)	n/a
Outstanding Achievement in Sports	1984 Summer Olympics (ABC)	n/a
Career Achievement Award	Grant Tinker	n/a

=== Multiple wins ===
The following shows received multiple wins:

Wins	Recipient
2	The Jewel in the Crown

=== Multiple nominations ===
The following shows received multiple nominations:

Nominations	Recipient
5	The Burning Bed
3	1984 Summer Olympics
3	The Cosby Show
3	Fatal Vision
3	The Jewel in the Crown
2	Cheers
2	Miami Vice
2	St. Elsewhere
