= 24th TCA Awards =

US television awards ceremony in 2008

- Date: July 19, 2008
- Venue: Beverly Hilton Hotel

Highlights
- Program of the Year: Mad Men
- Outstanding New Program: Mad Men

The 24th TCA Awards were presented by the Television Critics Association. The Smothers Brothers hosted the ceremony on July 19, 2008 at the Beverly Hilton Hotel.

== Winners and nominees ==
| Category | Winner | Other nominees |
|---|---|---|
| Program of the Year | Mad Men (AMC) | John Adams (HBO); Lost (ABC); The War (PBS); The Wire (HBO) |
| Outstanding Achievement in Comedy | 30 Rock (NBC) | The Colbert Report (Comedy Central); The Daily Show with Jon Stewart (Comedy Central); Flight of the Conchords (HBO); The Office (NBC) |
| Outstanding Achievement in Drama | Mad Men (AMC) | Damages (FX); Friday Night Lights (NBC); Lost (ABC); The Wire (HBO) |
| Outstanding Achievement in Movies, Miniseries and Specials | John Adams (HBO) | The Complete Jane Austen (PBS); Cranford (PBS); A Raisin in the Sun (ABC); The War (PBS) |
| Outstanding New Program of the Year | Mad Men (AMC) | Breaking Bad (AMC); Damages (FX); Flight of the Conchords (HBO); Pushing Daisies (ABC) |
| Individual Achievement in Comedy | Tina Fey - 30 Rock (NBC) | Christina Applegate - Samantha Who? (ABC); Alec Baldwin - 30 Rock (NBC); Stephen Colbert - The Colbert Report (Comedy Central); Ray Wise - Reaper (The CW) |
| Individual Achievement in Drama | Paul Giamatti - John Adams (HBO) | Connie Britton - Friday Night Lights (NBC); Glenn Close - Damages (FX); Jon Hamm - Mad Men (AMC); David Simon - The Wire (HBO) |
| Outstanding Achievement in Children's Programming | WordGirl (PBS) | Curious George (PBS); Hannah Montana (Disney Channel); High School Musical 2 (Disney Channel); Yo Gabba Gabba! (Nickelodeon) |
| Outstanding Achievement in News and Information | The War (PBS) | Alive Day Memories: Home from Iraq (HBO); Frontline (PBS); Nimrod Nation (Sundance Channel); This American Life (Showtime) |
| Heritage Award | The Wire (HBO) | M*A*S*H (CBS); Roots (ABC); Saturday Night Live (NBC); Sesame Street (PBS) |
| Career Achievement Award | Lorne Michaels | James Garner; Bill Moyers; William Shatner; Mike Wallace |

=== Multiple wins ===
The following shows received multiple wins:

| Wins | Recipient |
|---|---|
| 3 | Mad Men |
| 2 | 30 Rock |
| 2 | John Adams |

=== Multiple nominations ===
The following shows received multiple nominations:

| Nominations | Recipient |
|---|---|
| 4 | Mad Men |
| 4 | The Wire |
| 3 | 30 Rock |
| 3 | Damages |
| 3 | John Adams |
| 3 | The War |
| 2 | The Colbert Report |
| 2 | Flight of the Conchords |
| 2 | Friday Night Lights |
| 2 | Lost |
