= 5th TCA Awards =

US television awards ceremony in 1989

- Date: July 21, 1989
- Venue: Century Plaza Hotel, Los Angeles, California

Highlights
- Program of the Year: Lonesome Dove

The 5th TCA Awards were presented by the Television Critics Association. The ceremony was held on July 21, 1989 at the Century Plaza Hotel in Los Angeles, California.

== Winners and nominees ==
Category	Winner	Other Nominees
Program of the Year	Lonesome Dove (CBS)	Murderers Among Us: The Simon Wiesenthal Story (HBO); War and Remembrance (ABC)
Outstanding Achievement in Comedy	Murphy Brown (CBS)	Roseanne (ABC); The Wonder Years (ABC)
Outstanding Achievement in Drama	Lonesome Dove (CBS)	China Beach (ABC); L.A. Law (NBC); thirtysomething (ABC); War and Remembrance (ABC)
Outstanding Achievement in Specials	What's Alan Watching? (CBS)	The 42nd Annual Tony Awards (CBS); Comic Relief III (HBO); Glory! Glory! (HBO)
Outstanding Achievement in Children's Programming	The Jim Henson Hour (NBC)	Reading Rainbow (PBS); Sesame Street (PBS); WonderWorks (PBS)
Outstanding Achievement in News and Information	CNN	C-SPAN; Frontline (PBS); Nightline (ABC)
Outstanding Achievement in Sports	1988 Summer Olympics (NBC)	1988 World Series (NBC); NBA on CBS (CBS); SportsCenter (ESPN)
Career Achievement Award	Lucille Ball	Roone Arledge; Dan Curtis; Jim Henson; Brandon Stoddard

=== Multiple wins ===
The following shows received multiple wins:

Wins	Recipient
2	Lonesome Dove

=== Multiple nominations ===
The following shows received multiple nominations:

Nominations	Recipient
2	Lonesome Dove
2	War and Remembrance
