= 27th TCA Awards =

US television awards ceremony in 2011

- Date: August 6, 2011
- Venue: Beverly Hilton Hotel

Highlights
- Program of the Year: Friday Night Lights
- Outstanding New Program: Game of Thrones

The 27th TCA Awards were presented by the Television Critics Association. Nick Offerman hosted the ceremony on August 6, 2011, at the Beverly Hilton Hotel.

== Winners and nominees ==
Category	Winner	Other Nominees
Program of the Year	Friday Night Lights (NBC/Audience Network)	Boardwalk Empire (HBO); Game of Thrones (HBO); Justified (FX); Parks and Recreation (NBC)
Outstanding Achievement in Comedy	Modern Family (ABC)	Community (NBC); Louie (FX); Parks and Recreation (NBC); Raising Hope (Fox)
Outstanding Achievement in Drama	Mad Men (AMC)	Friday Night Lights (NBC/Audience Network); Game of Thrones (HBO); The Good Wife (CBS); Justified (FX)
Outstanding Achievement in Movies, Miniseries and Specials	Sherlock (PBS)	Cinema Verite (HBO); Downton Abbey (PBS); Mildred Pierce (HBO); Too Big to Fail (HBO)
Outstanding New Program	Game of Thrones (HBO)	Boardwalk Empire (HBO); The Killing (AMC); Terriers (FX); The Walking Dead (AMC)
Individual Achievement in Comedy	Ty Burrell - Modern Family (ABC) and Nick Offerman - Parks and Recreation (NBC)	Louis C.K. - Louie (FX); Amy Poehler - Parks and Recreation (NBC); Danny Pudi - Community (NBC); Jon Stewart - The Daily Show with Jon Stewart (Comedy Central)
Individual Achievement in Drama	Jon Hamm - Mad Men (AMC)	Steve Buscemi - Boardwalk Empire (HBO); Peter Dinklage - Game of Thrones (HBO); Julianna Margulies - The Good Wife (CBS); Margo Martindale - Justified (FX); Timothy Olyphant - Justified (FX)
Outstanding Achievement in Youth Programming	Sesame Street (PBS)	A Child's Garden of Poetry (HBO); iCarly (Nickelodeon); Nick News with Linda Ellerbee (Nickelodeon); R.L. Stine's The Haunting Hour (The Hub); Yo Gabba Gabba! (Nick Jr. Channel)
Outstanding Achievement in News and Information	Restrepo (National Geographic Channel)	30 for 30 (ESPN); 60 Minutes (CBS); If God Is Willing and Da Creek Don't Rise (HBO); The Rachel Maddow Show (MSNBC)
Outstanding Achievement in Reality Programming	The Amazing Race (CBS)	Anthony Bourdain: No Reservations (Travel Channel); Survivor (CBS); Top Chef: All Stars (Bravo); The Voice (NBC)
Heritage Award	The Dick Van Dyke Show (CBS)	All in the Family (CBS); Freaks and Geeks (NBC); Twin Peaks (ABC)
Career Achievement Award	Oprah Winfrey	Steven Bochco; Dick Ebersol; Cloris Leachman; David Letterman; William Shatner

=== Multiple wins ===
The following shows received multiple wins:

Wins	Recipient
2	Mad Men
2	Modern Family

=== Multiple nominations ===
The following shows received multiple nominations:

Nominations	Recipient
4	Game of Thrones
4	Justified
4	Parks and Recreation
3	Boardwalk Empire
2	Community
2	Friday Night Lights
2	The Good Wife
2	Louie
2	Mad Men
2	Modern Family
