= 8th TCA Awards =

US television awards ceremony in 1992

- Date: July 15, 1992
- Venue: Century Plaza Hotel, Los Angeles, California

Highlights
- Program of the Year: Northern Exposure

The 8th TCA Awards were presented by the Television Critics Association. The ceremony was held on July 15, 1992, at the Century Plaza Hotel in Los Angeles, Calif.

== Winners and nominees ==
| Category | Winner | Other Nominees |
|---|---|---|
| Program of the Year | Northern Exposure (CBS) | Brooklyn Bridge (CBS); I'll Fly Away (NBC); The Simpsons (Fox) |
| Outstanding Achievement in Comedy | Seinfeld (NBC) | Brooklyn Bridge (CBS); Murphy Brown (CBS); Northern Exposure (CBS); The Simpsons (Fox) |
| Outstanding Achievement in Drama | I'll Fly Away (NBC) | Civil Wars (ABC); Homefront (ABC); Law & Order (NBC); Northern Exposure (CBS) |
| Outstanding Achievement in Specials | Billy Crystal - The 64th Annual Academy Awards (ABC) | MGM: When the Lion Roars (TNT); When It Was a Game (HBO) |
| Outstanding Achievement in Children's Programming | Peggy Charren of Action for Children's Television | Linda Ellerbee (Nickelodeon); 3-2-1 Contact Special: What Kids Want to Know About Sex and Growing Up (PBS); Nickelodeon Special Edition: A Conversation with Magic (Nickelodeon); Where in the World Is Carmen Sandiego? (PBS) |
| Outstanding Achievement in News and Information | Frontline (PBS) | C-SPAN; Russian coup coverage (CNN); Nightline (ABC) |
| Outstanding Achievement in Sports | When It Was a Game (HBO) | 1991 World Series (CBS); 1992 Masters Tournament (CBS); 1992 Winter Olympics (CBS) |
| Career Achievement Award | Johnny Carson | Roone Arledge; Steven Bochco; Joshua Brand & John Falsey; Peggy Charren; Ted Turner |

=== Multiple nominations ===
The following shows received multiple nominations:

| Nominations | Recipient |
|---|---|
| 3 | Northern Exposure |
| 2 | Brooklyn Bridge |
| 2 | I'll Fly Away |
| 2 | The Simpsons |
| 2 | When It Was a Game |
