= 12th TCA Awards =

US television awards ceremony in 1996

- Date: July 20, 1996
- Venue: Ritz-Carlton Huntington Hotel and Spa, Pasadena, California

Highlights
- Program of the Year: Homicide: Life on the Street

The 12th TCA Awards were presented by the Television Critics Association in a ceremony hosted by Heidi Swedberg. The ceremony was held on July 20, 1996, at the Ritz-Carlton Huntington Hotel and Spa in Pasadena, California.

== Winners and nominees ==
Category	Winner	Other nominees
Program of the Year	Homicide: Life on the Street (NBC)	ER (NBC); Gulliver's Travels (NBC); Murder One (ABC); NYPD Blue (ABC)
Outstanding Achievement in Comedy	Frasier (NBC)	3rd Rock from the Sun (NBC); The Larry Sanders Show (HBO); Seinfeld (NBC); The Simpsons (Fox)
Outstanding Achievement in Drama	Homicide: Life on the Street (NBC)	ER (NBC); Murder One (ABC); NYPD Blue (ABC); The X-Files (Fox)
Outstanding Achievement in Specials	Pride and Prejudice (A&E)	The 68th Annual Academy Awards (ABC); Barbara Walters: 20 Years at ABC (ABC); The Beatles Anthology (ABC)
Outstanding Achievement in Children's Programming	Wishbone (PBS)	Goosebumps (Fox); Nick News with Linda Ellerbee (Nickelodeon)
Outstanding Achievement in News and Information	Frontline (PBS)	CNN; 20/20 (ABC); 60 Minutes (CBS); Nightline (ABC)
Outstanding Achievement in Sports	SportsCenter (ESPN)	Baseball Tonight (ESPN); ESPN National Hockey Night (ESPN/ESPN2); NFL on Fox (Fox); Outside the Lines (ESPN); Real Sports with Bryant Gumbel (HBO)
Career Achievement Award	Angela Lansbury	Roone Arledge; Steven Bochco; Mike Wallace; Barbara Walters

=== Multiple wins ===
The following shows received multiple wins:

Wins	Recipient
2	Homicide: Life on the Street

=== Multiple nominations ===
The following shows received multiple nominations:

Nominations	Recipient
2	ER
2	Homicide: Life on the Street
2	Murder One
2	NYPD Blue
