= 13th TCA Awards =

US television awards ceremony in 1997

- Date: July 20, 1997
- Venue: Huntington Hotel and Spa, Pasadena, California

Highlights
- Program of the Year: EZ Streets

The 13th TCA Awards were presented by the Television Critics Association. Drew Carey hosted the ceremony on July 20, 1997, at the Huntington Hotel and Spa in Pasadena, Calif.

== Winners and nominees ==
Category	Winner	Other Nominees
Program of the Year	EZ Streets (CBS)	Homicide: Life on the Street (NBC); The Odyssey (NBC); Seinfeld (NBC); The X-Files (Fox)
Outstanding Achievement in Comedy	The Larry Sanders Show (HBO)	3rd Rock from the Sun (NBC); Frasier (NBC); King of the Hill (Fox); Seinfeld (NBC)
Outstanding Achievement in Drama	Homicide: Life on the Street (NBC)	EZ Streets (CBS); Law & Order (NBC); NYPD Blue (ABC); The X-Files (Fox)
Outstanding Achievement in Movies, Miniseries and Specials	Bastard out of Carolina (Showtime)	The Last Don (CBS); Moll Flanders (PBS); The Odyssey (NBC); The West (PBS)
Individual Achievement in Comedy	David Hyde Pierce - Frasier (NBC)	Drew Carey - The Drew Carey Show (ABC); Kelsey Grammer - Frasier (NBC); John Lithgow - 3rd Rock from the Sun (NBC); Rip Torn - The Larry Sanders Show (HBO)
Individual Achievement in Drama	Andre Braugher - Homicide: Life on the Street (NBC)	Gillian Anderson - The X-Files (Fox); David Duchovny - The X-Files (Fox); Anthony Edwards - ER (NBC); Dennis Franz - NYPD Blue (ABC); Joe Pantoliano - EZ Streets (CBS)
Outstanding Achievement in Children's Programming	Bill Nye the Science Guy (PBS) and Wishbone (PBS)	Arthur (PBS); The Magic School Bus (PBS); Mister Rogers' Neighborhood (PBS); Rugrats (Nickelodeon)
Outstanding Achievement in News and Information	The American Experience (PBS)	20/20 (ABC); 60 Minutes (CBS); Frontline (PBS); Nightline (ABC)
Outstanding Achievement in Sports	SportsCenter (ESPN)	1996 World Series (Fox); 1997 Masters Tournament (CBS); Monday Night Football (ABC); Real Sports with Bryant Gumbel (HBO)
Career Achievement Award	Fred Rogers	Roone Arledge; Steven Bochco; Bill Cosby; Jack Paar; Roseanne (ABC)

=== Multiple wins ===
The following shows received multiple wins:

Wins	Recipient
2	Homicide: Life on the Street

=== Multiple nominations ===
The following shows received multiple nominations:

Nominations	Recipient
4	The X-Files
3	EZ Streets
3	Frasier
3	Homicide: Life on the Street
2	3rd Rock from the Sun
2	The Larry Sanders Show
2	NYPD Blue
2	The Odyssey
2	Seinfeld
