= 10th TCA Awards =

US television awards ceremony in 1994

- Date: July 22, 1994
- Venue: Universal City Hilton and Towers, Los Angeles, California

Highlights
- Program of the Year: Late Show with David Letterman

The 10th TCA Awards were presented by the Television Critics Association. Ellen DeGeneres hosted the ceremony at the Universal City Hilton and Towers on July 22, 1994. DeGeneres was the first celebrity guest to host the TCA Awards.

== Winners and nominees ==
Category	Winner	Other Nominees
Program of the Year	Late Show with David Letterman (CBS)	1994 Winter Olympics (CBS); The Great Depression (PBS); Gypsy (CBS); NYPD Blue (ABC); Prime Suspect 3 (PBS)
Outstanding Achievement in Comedy	Frasier (NBC)	The Larry Sanders Show (HBO); Late Show with David Letterman (CBS); Seinfeld (NBC); The Simpsons (Fox)
Outstanding Achievement in Drama	NYPD Blue (ABC)	Homicide: Life on the Street (NBC); Law & Order (NBC); Prime Suspect 3 (PBS); The X-Files (Fox)
Outstanding Achievement in Specials	Prime Suspect 3 (PBS)	Gypsy (CBS); One for the Road with Charles Kuralt and Morley Safer (CBS); Tales of the City (PBS)
Outstanding Achievement in Children's Programming	Linda Ellerbee (Nickelodeon)	Animaniacs (Fox); Beakman's World (The Learning Channel/CBS); Bill Nye the Science Guy (PBS); Sesame Street (PBS); Where in the World Is Carmen Sandiego? (PBS)
Outstanding Achievement in News and Information	Nightline (ABC)	60 Minutes (CBS); CBS News Sunday Morning (CBS); Frontline (PBS); The MacNeil/Lehrer NewsHour (PBS)
Outstanding Achievement in Sports	1994 Winter Olympics (CBS)	1993 World Series (CBS); 1994 NCAA Final Four (CBS); Baseball Tonight (ESPN); SportsCenter (ESPN)
Career Achievement Award	Charles Kuralt	Roone Arledge; Steven Bochco; David Letterman; Ted Turner

=== Multiple nominations ===
The following shows received multiple nominations:

Nominations	Recipient
3	Prime Suspect 3
2	1994 Winter Olympics
2	Late Show with David Letterman
2	Gypsy
2	NYPD Blue
