= 9th TCA Awards =

US television awards ceremony in 1993

- Date: July 23, 1993
- Venue: Universal City Hilton and Towers, Los Angeles, California

Highlights
- Program of the Year: Barbarians at the Gate

The 9th TCA Awards were presented by the Television Critics Association. The ceremony was held on July 23, 1993, at the Universal City Hilton and Towers in Los Angeles, Calif.

== Winners and nominees ==
Category	Winner	Other Nominees
Program of the Year	Barbarians at the Gate (HBO)	Cheers (NBC); Homicide: Life on the Street (NBC); Seinfeld (NBC); The Simpsons (Fox)
Outstanding Achievement in Comedy	Seinfeld (NBC)	Cheers (NBC); The Larry Sanders Show (HBO); Roseanne (ABC); The Simpsons (Fox)
Outstanding Achievement in Drama	I'll Fly Away (NBC)	Barbarians at the Gate (HBO); Homefront (ABC); Homicide: Life on the Street (NBC); Law & Order (NBC); Prime Suspect 2 (PBS)
Outstanding Achievement in Specials	Fallen Champ: The Untold Story of Mike Tyson (NBC)	Michael Jackson Talks... to Oprah: 90 Primetime Minutes with the King of Pop (ABC); Rowan & Martin's Laugh-In: 25th Anniversary Reunion (NBC); Women of Country (CBS)
Outstanding Achievement in Children's Programming	Linda Ellerbee (Nickelodeon)	Beakman's World (The Learning Channel/Syndicated); Mister Rogers' Neighborhood (PBS); Sesame Street (PBS); Where in the World Is Carmen Sandiego? (PBS)
Outstanding Achievement in News and Information	Frontline (PBS)	60 Minutes (CBS); Nightline (ABC); POV (PBS); World News Tonight with Peter Jennings (ABC)
Outstanding Achievement in Sports	Bob Costas	1992 World Series (CBS); ESPN Major League Baseball (ESPN); SportsCenter (ESPN)
Career Achievement Award	Bob Hope	Roone Arledge; David Letterman; Bill Moyers; Fred Rogers

=== Multiple nominations ===
The following shows received multiple nominations:

Nominations	Recipient
2	Barbarians at the Gate
2	Cheers
2	Homicide: Life on the Street
2	Seinfeld
2	The Simpsons
