= 11th TCA Awards =

US television awards ceremony in 1995

- Date: July 21, 1995
- Venue: Ritz-Carlton Huntington Hotel and Spa, Pasadena, California

Highlights
- Program of the Year: ER

The 11th TCA Awards were presented by the Television Critics Association in a ceremony hosted by Friends co-stars Jennifer Aniston and Matt LeBlanc. The ceremony was held on July 21, 1995, at the Ritz-Carlton Huntington Hotel and Spa in Pasadena, Calif.

== Winners and nominees ==
Category	Winner	Other Nominees
Program of the Year	ER (NBC)	Baseball (PBS); Homicide: Life on the Street (NBC); My So-Called Life (ABC); The X-Files (Fox)
Outstanding Achievement in Comedy	Frasier (NBC)	Friends (NBC); The Larry Sanders Show (HBO); Mad About You (NBC); Seinfeld (NBC)
Outstanding Achievement in Drama	My So-Called Life (ABC)	ER (NBC); Homicide: Life on the Street (NBC); NYPD Blue (ABC); The X-Files (Fox)
Outstanding Achievement in Specials	Baseball (PBS)	500 Nations (CBS); Barbra: The Concert (HBO); Tales from the Far Side (CBS)
Outstanding Achievement in Children's Programming	Nick News with Linda Ellerbee (Nickelodeon)	Mister Rogers' Neighborhood (PBS); Rugrats (Nickelodeon); Sesame Street (PBS)
Outstanding Achievement in News and Information	Frontline (PBS) and Nightline (ABC)	CNN; The O.J. Simpson Trial coverage (CNN); The MacNeil/Lehrer NewsHour (PBS)
Outstanding Achievement in Sports	Baseball (PBS)	1995 NCAA Final Four (CBS); Bob Costas; HBO Boxing (HBO); SportsCenter (ESPN)
Career Achievement Award	Ted Turner	Roone Arledge; Steven Bochco; David Letterman; Bill Moyers

=== Multiple wins ===
The following shows received multiple wins:

Wins	Recipient
2	Baseball

=== Multiple nominations ===
The following shows received multiple nominations:

Nominations	Recipient
3	Baseball
2	ER
2	Homicide: Life on the Street
2	My So-Called Life
2	The X-Files
