= TCA Awards =

Awards presented by the Television Critics Association

TCA Award
- Current: 42nd TCA Awards
- Awarded for: Excellence in Television
- Country: United States; Canada
- Presented by: Television Critics Association
- First award: 1985
- Website: tvcritics.org/tca-awards

The TCA Awards are awards presented by the Television Critics Association in recognition of excellence in television. There are eleven categories, which are presented every summer towards the end of the organization's summer press tour.

Due to the COVID-19 pandemic, the 2020 and 2021 awards were presented online. Due to the 2023 Hollywood labor disputes, the winners of the 2023 awards were presented via a press release by the TCA with no in-person ceremony.

== Categories ==
TCA Awards are currently awarded in the following categories:

- Program of the Year
- Outstanding New Program
- Individual Achievement in Drama
- Individual Achievement in Comedy
- Outstanding Achievement in Drama
- Outstanding Achievement in Comedy
- Outstanding Achievement in Movies, Miniseries, and Specials
- Outstanding Achievement in News and Information
- Outstanding Achievement in Reality Programming
- Outstanding Achievement in Sketch/Variety Shows
- Outstanding Achievement in Youth Programming
- Outstanding Achievement in Family Programming
- Outstanding Achievement in Animation
- Outstanding International Series
- Career Achievement Award
- Heritage Award

Retired categories:

- Outstanding Achievement in Sports

== List of TCA Awards ceremonies ==
- 2026
- 2025
- 2024
- 2023
- 2022
- 2021
- 2020
- 2019
- 2018
- 2017
- 2016
- 2015
- 2014
- 2013
- 2012
- 2011
- 2010
- 2009
- 2008
- 2007
- 2006
- 2005
- 2004
- 2003
- 2002
- 2001
- 2000
- 1999
- 1998
- 1997
- 1996
- 1995
- 1994
- 1993
- 1992
- 1991
- 1990
- 1989
- 1988
- 1987
- 1986
- 1985

== See also ==
- Canadian television awards
