= The Langham Huntington, Pasadena =

Resort hotel in California, US

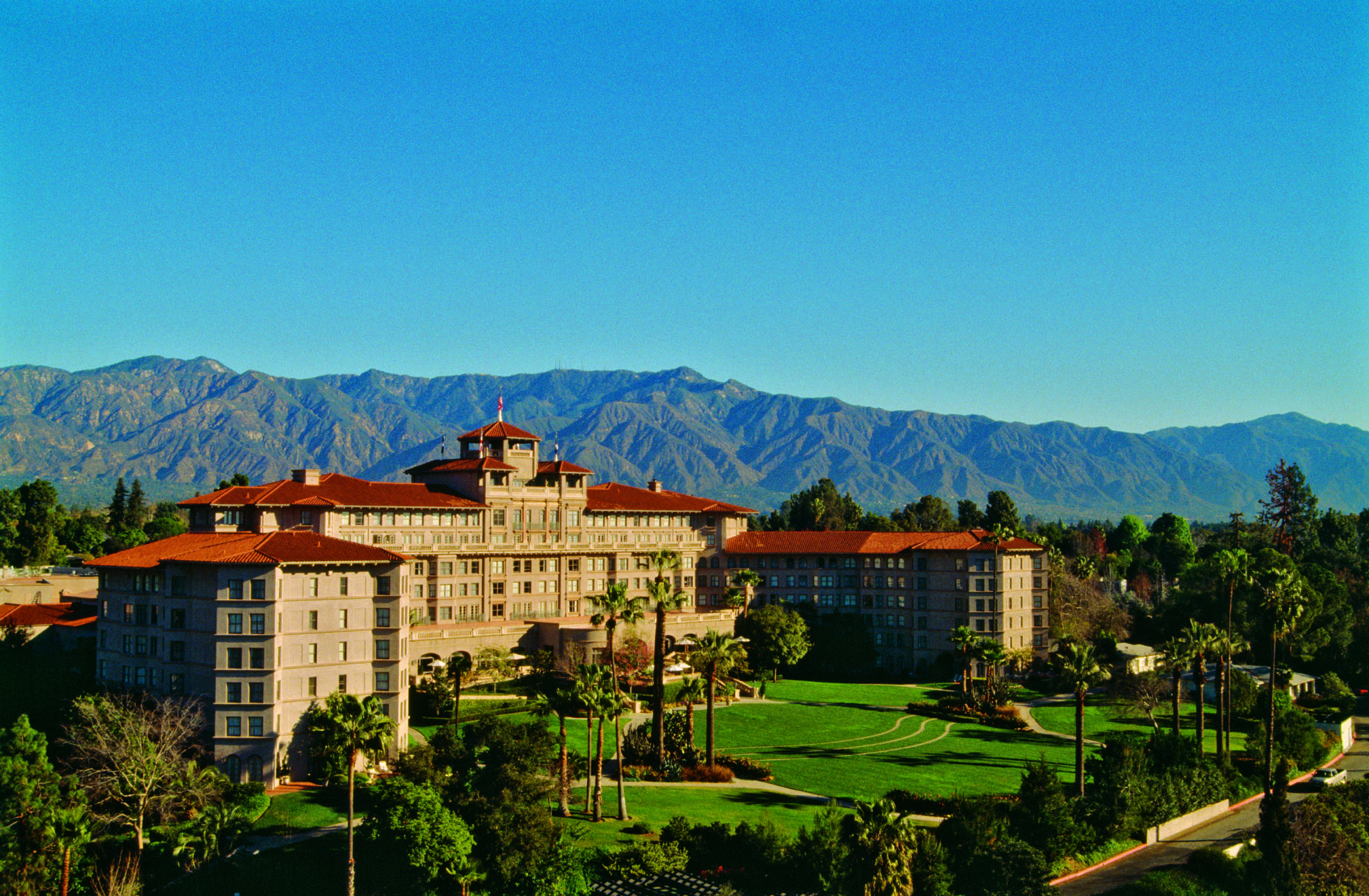
- The Langham Huntington, Pasadena

- Location within the Los Angeles metropolitan area The Langham Huntington (California) The Langham Huntington (the United States)

General information
- Location: Pasadena, California, 1401 South Oak Knoll Avenue
- Coordinates: 34.1203°N 118.1333°W
- Opened: 1907 (original building); 1991 (current building)
- Owner: Great Eagle Holdings
- Management: Langham Hotels International

Design and construction
- Architects: Charles Frederick Whittlesey (1906); Myron Hunt (1914 remodeling); McClellan, Cruz, Gaylord and Associates Local Architects, WATG (Wimberly Allison Tong and Goo) Design Architect and Architect of Record (1991 reconstruction)

Other information
- Number of rooms: 380

Website
- langhamhotels.com/pasadena

The Langham Huntington, Pasadena is a resort hotel located in Pasadena, California, that dates back to the Gilded Age.

== Original building (1907–1989) ==
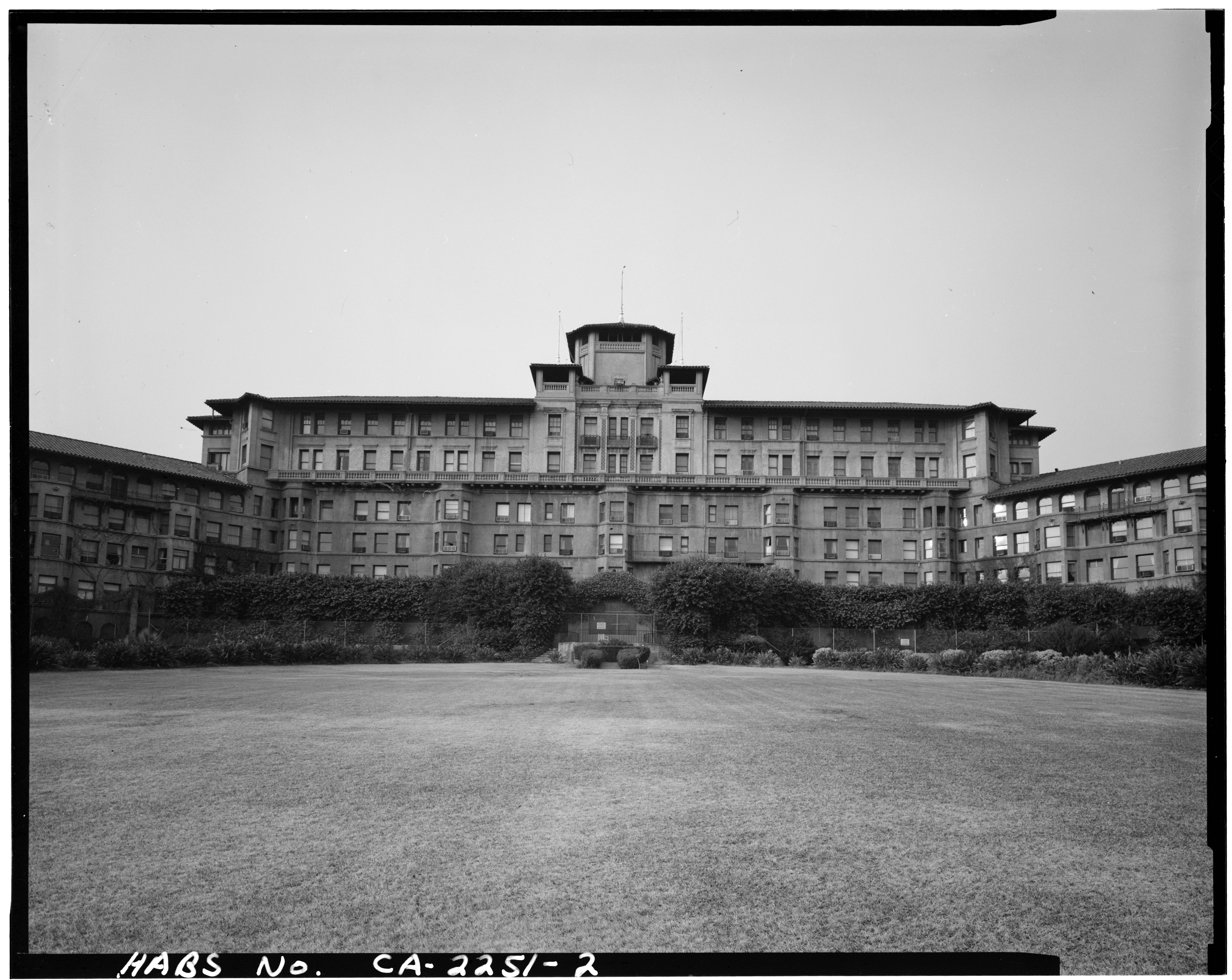
The original structure, soon after its closure, with a fence around it.

The original hotel on the site was built by General Marshall C. Wentworth, a US Civil War veteran, and designed by Charles Frederick Whittlesey in the Spanish Mission Revival-style. It opened in February 1907 as the Hotel Wentworth, but the structure was only partially complete, with the first four stories finished and a temporary roof. The hotel's completion had been delayed due to a shortage of construction crews caused by rebuilding in San Francisco following the 1906 earthquake. The Pacific Electric had already constructed their Wentworth Line interurban railroad to serve the hotel in 1906. Heavy rains in 1907 kept away prospective guests, and the Wentworth closed in July 1907 after its first season.

The Wentworth was purchased by railroad tycoon Henry E. Huntington in 1911 and reopened in 1914 as The Huntington Hotel after a major redesign by the architect Myron Hunt which added the hotel's upper two floors and its iconic central belvedere tower. It remained under Huntington's management until 1918. The hotel eventually comprised over 20 acres (8.1 ha). Between 1920 and 1926, 27 bungalow cottages were built on the grounds to accommodate long-term guests. California's first outdoor Olympic-size swimming pool was added in 1926, when the hotel, formerly a winter resort, began operating year-round.

The hotel was later owned by Stephen W. Royce, who sold it to the Sheraton Corporation in 1954. It was subsequently renamed the Huntington-Sheraton Hotel. As a Sheraton, much of the hotel's interior period detailing was covered over, and the Lanai Building was constructed next to the swimming pool in 1967. Sheraton sold the hotel to Keikyu U.S.A., Inc. in 1974, but continued to manage the property.

In the wake of the disastrous 1985 Mexico City earthquake, seismic tests conducted on the hotel showed the main building to be unsafe. As a result, the hotel's main wing had to be closed without notice on October 20, 1985, causing a chaotic scramble to relocate hundreds of social events booked at the hotel over the coming months. The 89 rooms in the 1967 Lanai wing and the 18 cottage homes remained in operation as the Huntington Sheraton Lanai and Cottages, while the six-story main building sat vacant. Huntington Hotel Associates (HHA) announced plans in 1986 to demolish the main wing of the hotel and replace it with a replica. After a year of debate and numerous pleas from preservationists, Pasadena voters chose on May 19, 1987, to give zoning approval to the demolition of the main building. HHA bought the hotel from Keikyu in December 1987. Sheraton ceased operating the hotel in January 1988, and it was renamed The Huntington Hotel & Cottages. The contents of the main building were sold to the public in June and July 1988 and demolition of the main building began on March 27, 1989, lasting three months. The lanai and cottages closed in mid-1990 as construction of the new main building progressed.

During the demolition and reconstruction of the main wing, the two historic ballrooms, the Viennese Ballroom (originally the hotel's dining room) and the Georgian Ballroom (originally the hotel's theater) were retained and incorporated into the new hotel, in addition to the other outbuildings such as the pool, lanai and bungalows, which were not required to be demolished. The $100-million reconstruction project revealed 10 stained-glass windows made of opalescent glass in the Georgian Ballroom, which had been covered over by the Sheraton Corporation in 1954 when the space was converted into a dining room.

== Reconstructed building (1991–Present) ==
The hotel reopened on March 18, 1991 with 383-rooms as The Ritz-Carlton, Huntington Hotel. The new building largely replicated the exterior of the original, but offered modern facilities. It was renamed The Ritz-Carlton, Huntington Hotel & Spa in April 1998. In October 2007, the hotel was sold to Great Eagle Holdings for $170 million and renamed The Langham Huntington, Pasadena, on January 8, 2008, managed by Langham Hotels International.

== In popular culture ==
- The hotel is featured as The Huntington Sheraton in the 1956 home movie Disneyland Dream.
- Multiple areas of the hotel are featured in the 1982 pilot episode of the TV series Remington Steele.
- The hotel appears in a 1982 second season episode of Simon & Simon, The Club Murder Vacation.
- The hotel appears in a 1984 first season episode of Highway to Heaven, Hotel of Dreams.
- The hotel appears in the 1985 film Girls Just Want to Have Fun
- The hotel appears in the 1985 television film Promises to Keep.
- The hotel appears in a 1986 seventh season episode of Knots Landing, Phoenix Rising.
- The shuttered hotel is featured in a 1986 third season episode of Scarecrow & Mrs. King, The Triumvirate.
- The shuttered hotel appears again in a 1987 fourth season episode of Scarecrow & Mrs. King, One Flew East.
- This hotel is featured in the 1998 Disney movie The Parent Trap as the Stafford Hotel.
- This hotel is featured in the 1998 movie Richie Rich A Christmas Wish for the exterior scenes of the sprawling Rich Family Mansion
- The 2007 film Charlie Wilson's War was filmed in the Georgian Ballroom.
- The 2012 film Beverly Hills Chihuahua 3 was filmed throughout the hotel.
- The Langham Huntington was the site for the much-publicized 2012 wedding of The Bachelorette's Ashley Hebert and J.P. Rosenbaum.
- The hotel's bar, The Tap Room, was used to double as The Beverly Hills Hotel in the 2013 Disney film, Saving Mr. Banks.
- The exterior and the front lawn represent the hotel in The Raj park of Westworld as seen in Virtù e Fortuna (S2 Ep3).
- The valet portico was used in the Ryan Murphy Netflix miniseries Hollywood as a double for the entrance to the Beverly Hills Hotel.
- The front entrance, rear building facade and lawn were used as the location for a fictional Nevada golf resort in the series HBO Max series Hacks, Par for the Course (S3 Ep6)
