= List of Full Frontal with Samantha Bee episodes =

This is a list of episodes of Full Frontal with Samantha Bee, an American late-night talk show and news satire program. The series premiered on TBS on February 8, 2016.

== Series overview ==
Season	Episodes	Originally released	
Season	Episodes	First released	Last released
1	39	February 8, 2016	February 8, 2017
2	33	February 15, 2017	January 31, 2018
3	33	February 7, 2018	January 30, 2019
4	34	February 6, 2019	January 29, 2020
5	32	February 5, 2020	December 16, 2020
6	30	January 13, 2021	December 15, 2021
7	17	January 20, 2022	June 23, 2022

== Episodes ==
=== Season 1 (2016–17) ===
No.	Title	Original release date	US viewers (millions)
1	"Episode 1"	February 8, 2016	2.16
"Ask Her Anything": skit set at a press conference where Bee confesses to using witchcraft to get the show going.; "A Modesty Proposal": Kansas Senator Mitch Holmes' dress code for women testifying before a state committee.; "A Jeb in Winter": a short, Werner Herzog-style documentary looks at Jeb Bush's supporters and lackluster campaign.; "New Hampshire Primary Part 1": New Hampshire Democratic primary, 2016, debate between Hillary Clinton and Bernie Sanders.; "New Hampshire Primary Part 2": New Hampshire Republican primary, 2016, debate between the Republican candidates.; The original airing of this episode was simulcast on TBS, Adult Swim, TNT, truTV, and HLN.
2	"Episode 2"	February 15, 2016	0.541
"Scalia Dies, Republicans Debate": death of Supreme Court justice Antonin Scalia and the Republican primary debate.; "The Democratic Debate": Democratic primary debate.; "Syrian Refugees Part 1": visit to a Syrian refugee camp (Part 1 of 2)
3	"Episode 3"	February 22, 2016	0.565
"Republicans in South Carolina": Republican primary campaigning in South Carolina.; "The Real Kasich": segment on Republican presidential primary candidate John Kasich contending that Kasich is no moderate.; "Job Fair for Future Women": commentary on workplace sexual harassment of women.; "Syrian Refugees Part 2": visit to a Syrian refugee camp (Part 2 of 2); "Kasich Defunds Planned Parenthood": John Kasich's signing of a bill that defunds Planned Parenthood in Ohio.
4	"Episode 4"	February 29, 2016	0.675
"2010 Elections": commentary on the importance of the 2010 mid-term elections.; "Abortions, Texas-Style": Bee visits a Texan abortion clinic and reviews the strict regulations of abortion clinics in Texas.; "Black History Month": a segment on appropriation of Black History Month.; "The Archbishop Vs. The Girl Scouts": Archbishop of St. Louis Robert Carlson's disagreement with the Girl Scouts of the USA over homosexuality.; "The Office Tour": skit wherein Bee takes a tour of the show's office; the employees are less than enthused.
5	"2010 Was the Most Important Election"	March 7, 2016	0.687
"R.I.P. G.O.P.": a look at the troubles of the Republican party following the rise of Donald Trump in the 2016 presidential primary election.; "Democrats Debate in Flint": Democratic debate in Flint, Michigan.; "Duck and Cover": schools instituting drills to prepare for school shootings.; "Women Business Owners": segment on the news that women-owned small businesses have reached 5% of the businesses receiving federal contracts.; "Great Job, Sam!": skit wherein Bee is a secret Ted Cruz admirer but still attack him in exchange for pay-offs from the liberal media.
6	"Trump Voters"	March 14, 2016	0.707
"Hillary, No!": Hillary Clinton's comment on the legacy of Nancy Reagan regarding AIDS.; "Cruz 101": a look at US presidential primary candidate Ted Cruz.; "Matt Bevin": critique of Kentucky Governor Matt Bevin.; "Greetings, Trump Supporters": segment featuring a group of Donald Trump supporters.; "North Korean Missiles": skit parodying the removal of protesters from Trump rallies.
7	"American Atheists at CPAC"	March 21, 2016	0.650
"Supreme Court Battle": political wrangling over the Supreme Court nomination of Merrick Garland.; "Rape Kit Backlog": the issue of thousands of untested rape kits.; "There is No God at CPAC": atheist activist David Silverman at the Conservative Political Action Conference.; "In Case You Missed It...": promotion of the show's homepage.; "Sam and Gloria Steinem": skit featuring Gloria Steinem, Bee seeks inspiration from a miniature Steinem.
8	"Eddie Eagle"	April 11, 2016	0.568
"What the Hell Are Superdelegates?": a look at Democratic National Convention superdelegates.; "Poor Babies Don't Deserve Diapers": President Obama's initiative to provide low-cost diapers to low-income families, and the fact that food stamps can't be used to buy them.; "Eddie Eagle": Bee does everything in her power to hunt down the NRA's mascot, Eddie Eagle.; "Gun TV": segment on the American shopping channel Gun TV which allows buyers to purchase firearms via their television.
9	"Bernie Voters"	April 18, 2016	0.681
"New York Primaries Part 1": New York Republican primary, 2016. John Kasich and Donald Trump campaigning in New York.; "New York Primaries Part 2": awkward family moments during the 2016 primary campaigning in New York.; "The Worst Person in Tennessee: Jerry Durham": segment on member of the Tennessee House of Representatives Jeremy Durham, key sponsor of Tennessee's bathroom bill.; "Bernie "Bros"": Bee sits down with a panel of Bernie supporters to try to understand their point of view.; "The Worst Person in Tennessee 2: Sheila Butt": segment on Republican Majority Floor Leader of the Tennessee House of Representatives Sheila Butt, who blocked a bill exempting rape and incest victims from a 48-hour waiting period before getting an abortion.; "Blame Katie Couric": skit where Bee pretends to be Katie Couric in order to deflect criticism.
10	"Guantanamo Bay"	April 25, 2016	0.612
"Kasich and Cruz: Brothers in Hopelessness": the two Republican primary candidates and their plan to cooperate to deny Trump the Republican nomination.; "Twenty-Dollar Tubman": segment on the news that the image of Harriet Tubman will be on the new $20 bill.; "The Wrong Guy": the case of Murat Kurnaz who was imprisoned in Guantanamo Bay detention camp.; "Sanders and Superdelegates": the Bernie Sanders campaign and its plan to win the nomination by flipping Democratic superdelegates; "Sam's Fashion Consultant": skit where Bee subjects her stylist to ridiculous demands.
11	"Crisis Pregnancy Centers"	May 9, 2016	0.622
"Cruz Bows Out / Michelle Branch": tongue-in-cheek lament for the demise of Ted Cruz's presidential campaign, features Michelle Branch.; "2010 Election: Part Two": segment on the 2010 mid-term election of a Republican majority in North Carolina as the source of the Public Facilities Privacy & Security Act bathroom bill.; "Crisis Pregnancy Centers": Patton Oswalt satire on crisis pregnancy centers modeled on Orson Welles' F for Fake; "Play Us Out, Michelle": Michelle Branch reprise of the song in the first segment.
12	"Super PACs"	May 16, 2016	0.632
"The Religious Right": history of the Religious Right in the USA.; "The Seattle Seawards": Bee talks about a gender split decision on a city council over whether to publicly fund a new basketball stadium in Seattle.; "The Victims of Super PACs": in the style of an anti-drug PSA, Bee interviews a man who donated to PACs for Jeb Bush and others.; "Seattle Seawards Outtakes"
13	"Vaping"	May 23, 2016 (Note: This episode did not premiere on the East Coast until 12am on May 24, 2016; a repeat of the previous week's episode was accidentally aired in the show's usual 10:30 p.m. timeslot. The episode aired as normal in other time zones.)	0.512
"Feel The Turn": tensions flare as Sanders supporters contest the Nevada democratic caucus.; "The Religious Right: Part Two": segment on the Religious Right and its activism against abortion.; "Big Tobacco vs. Little Vape": small-scale electronic cigarette manufacturers and their opposition to new FDA regulations.; "Whatever Happened to Full Frontal?": spoof intro sequence in the style of the film Whatever Happened to the Human Race?.
14	"Gary Johnson"	June 6, 2016	0.596
"A Man, A Sam, and A Tiny Horse": skit wherein Bee seeks the advice of Jon Stewart and ends up giving him a tiny horse for his animal rescue farm.; "The Bed We've Made": media coverage of the two presumptive 2016 US presidential election nominees Clinton and Trump and a look at how the Republican primary candidates changed their view on Trump once he secured the nomination.; "#passMJIA": the problem of sexual assault in the United States military and the Military Justice Improvement Act.; "Gary Johnson: He's Also Running": Libertarian Party candidate for US president, Gary Johnson.; "The "Ted Cruz Caress" Challenge": Bee promises to caress Ted Cruz if the Military Justice Improvement Act is passed.
15	"Libertarian Convention"	June 13, 2016	0.626
"Again? Again.": commentary on the Orlando nightclub shooting and gun laws in Australia.; "Florida's Mental Health": Florida state initiative to improve mental health care.; "The Many Faces (and Crotches) of Libertarians": field piece from the 2016 Libertarian National Convention in Orlando, Florida.; "Pat Kiernan: National Treasure": Pat Kiernan's comment on gun control following the Orlando nightclub shooting.
16	"Tribal Courts"	June 20, 2016	0.669
"From Their Cold Dead Hands": gun control debate in America in the wake of the Orlando nightclub shooting.; "Looking Under the GOP's Hood": the views of presumptive Republican presidential nominee Donald Trump and its effects on the Republican party.; "Indian Bummer": field piece on tribal sovereignty in the United States, regarding the jurisdiction of tribal courts.; "Something Nice for a Change": encounter between mourners of the victims of the Orlando nightclub shooting and a Muslim woman.
17	"Muslim-American Reporting"	June 27, 2016	0.643
"Rue Britannia": segment on the United Kingdom withdrawal from the European Union (a.k.a. "Brexit"), with cameo by David Tennant.; "Oh Shit, Brexit": Brexit aftermath, and what it portends for the 2016 US presidential election.; "Saw Something Said Something": field piece from Dearborn, Michigan. The Muslim-American Community and its efforts against terrorism.; "The Supremely Busy Court": quick review of the Supreme Court cases Whole Woman's Health v. Hellerstedt (Texas abortion restrictions struck down), Fisher v. University of Texas (affirmative action program upheld) and Voisine v. United States (the Court held that reckless misdemeanor domestic violence convictions trigger gun control prohibitions on gun ownership); "The Many faces of Charlie Rose": skit where Bee is interviewed by Charlie Rose. By flicking a light switch, it's revealed that Rose has a number of clones
18	"Cleveland"	July 18, 2016	0.605
"The Not- Ready-For-Primetime Party": the lack of prominent Republican speakers and donors at the 2016 Republican National Convention and pick of Republican vice presidential candidate Mike Pence.; "Born Again in the U.S.A.": the Western Conservative Summit and evangelical support for Republican presidential nominee Donald Trump.; "Cleveland Braces for Impact": the city of Cleveland's preparations for protests ahead of the 2016 Republican National Convention.; "A Very Special Full Frontal Special": announcement of a special episode of Full Frontal with Samantha Bee on the 2016 US presidential election.
19	"Special: Full Frontal Election Documentary"	July 20, 2016	1.062
"We Got a Bus!": using a bus (ostensibly the tour bus of 2012 Republican presidential primary candidate Herman Cain) the Full Frontal crew goes on a road trip from New York to the 2016 Republican National Convention in Cleveland, Ohio, interviewing voters along the way.; "Nice to Meet You, America": "A Very Special Pep Talk": "Hello, Cleveland!":
20	"Republican National Convention"	July 25, 2016	0.544
"GÖP-Erdämmerung"; "Disturbing the PC"; "Most Lives Matter"; "You're Still Standing"
21	"Democratic National Convention"	August 1, 2016	0.678
"Turn On, Tune In, Feel Good"; "404: Voter Connection Not Found"; "Democracy, Interrupted "; "A Drive to Remember"
22	"Latinos for Trump"	September 12, 2016	0.694
"We're Back and Everything Is Scary Now"; ""Asking" the "Tough" "Questions" "; "DIY Election Coverage"; "This Week in WTF: Latinos for Trump"; "Outfoxed by Fox"
23	"Super Lobbyist"	September 19, 2016	0.557
"Too Close for Comfort"; "Master Media Baiter"; "A Match Made in Hell"; "Chief Executive Fear Mongerer"; "This Week in "Huh?": Super Delegate-Lobbyists"; "See You Next Wednesday #CUNW"
24	"Presidential Debate Special"	September 28, 2016	1.502
"Fear and Loathing at Hofstra University"; "Go Ahead, Make Her Day"; "Advice She Didn't Ask For"; "Debate Watchers"; "Dancing Near the Stars"
25	"Rigged!"	October 5, 2016	1.254
"RIGGED!!! "; "Maine's Personal Trump"; "Party Like It's 1997"; "Meet the Veeps"
26	"Second Presidential Debate Special"	October 10, 2016 (Note: This episode premiered on TBS on Oct 10, 2016 at 10:30 p.m. (0.968 million/0.33 rating); a repeat aired the next day with more viewers (1.111 million/0.46 rating).)	0.968/1.111 (rerun)
"Cold Open: Forever Unclean"; "Pussy Riot"; "GOP Fear the P"; "Debate 2: Misery in Missouri"; "We Thought We Were Done With This"
27	"United Nations"	October 24, 2016	0.842
"Debate 3: The Good, The Bad, The Nasty"; "First: Do No Harm. Second: Do No Pussy Stuff"; "OK Ladies Now Let's Get Information"; "Nasty Women, Assemble!"
28	"President Obama"	October 31, 2016	0.817
"Feelin' Alt-Right": a segment about Alt-Right.; "Russian Thinkfluencers": Sam talks to Russian trolls.; "A Totally Real, 100% Valid Theory": in a new segment, "People Are Saying", Full Frontal has a theory that Trump cannot read.; "Full Frontal Presidential Interviews: Barack Obama": Sam interviews President Obama.; "Full Frontal Extra Credit": Sam promotes the links on her website.; "Cold Open – Orange Feelings Matter": Sam talks to Conan O'Brien.
29	"Meet the (Russian) Press"	November 7, 2016	0.750
"Let Hillary Be Hillary"; "The Fascinating Emails of a Sixty-Something": Sarah Paulson reads Hillary's emails.; "Freedom of Depress"; "Don't Fuck This Up"
30	"Post-Election"	November 9, 2016	1.383
"Cold Open – A Beautiful, Faraway Dream"; "The Morning After"; "Come Together or Whatever"; "Something That Actually "Existed": Trump Policy Shop"; "Lizzo, Save Us"
31	"November 14, 2016"	November 14, 2016	0.750
"New Cabinet Installation"; "Sore Winners"; "Did We Stutter: Syrian Refugees"; "An Exercise in Escapism with Jon Stewart"
32	"December 5, 2016"	December 5, 2016	0.807
"Fake News, Real Consequences"; "Eroding Electoral Confidence"; "The Big Lie"; "And the Thunder Cunt Goes To..."
33	"December 12, 2016"	December 12, 2016	0.657
"Ohio on the Pulse"; "Democrats in the Wilderness"; "Ms. Robot"; "Inappropriate Merch for this Holiday Season": before the holiday season kicks off, Bee introduces her merchandise for the holidays.
34	"December 19, 2016"	December 19, 2016	0.647
"A Very Special Legislative Session"; "Strange Bedfellows"; "Those Are Real People: Veterans & Refugees"; "See You Wednesdays, 2017!": before the winter break, Bee announced that her show is moving from a Monday to a Wednesday night in 2017.
35	"January 11, 2017"	January 11, 2017	1.377
"People Are Saying: Trump Likes Pee"; "A Session On Sessions"; "Time For One Last (And First) Obama Hit Piece"; "Theme from Full Frontal ft. The Groove Barbers"; "White Plight" (web extra); "Web Extra: Deportable Bee" (web extra)
36	"January 18, 2017"	January 18, 2017	1.315
"Swamp Dwellers"; "The Great Feminists in Feminism Herstory Hall of Lady Fame"; "Full Frontal is Scared: Masha Gessen Edition"; "Tonight, We Ride!"
37	"January 25, 2017"	January 25, 2017	1.500
"Coronation Street": Bee recaps Trump's inauguration.; "Who March the World? Girls."; "Get Your Gloat On"; "We're Gonna Make It After All"; "The Inauguration Wasn't All Bad" (web extra); "Don't I Know You From Somewhere?" (web extra)
38	"February 1, 2017"	February 1, 2017	1.412
"The Not-A-Muslim-Ban Muslim Ban"; "Refugees Refused"; "Full Frontal Has A Heart-On: Lee Gelernt Edition"; "Nasty Women: Meet Bad Dudes"; "Loyal To A T" (bonus act)
39	"February 8, 2017"	February 8, 2017	1.440
"CNN Had It In Them the Whole Time"; "Donald and the Terrible, Horrible, No Good, Very Bad Sanctuary Cities"; "The Original Trump Haters": Amy Hoggart goes to Scotland to talk to Michael Forbes and others who resisted Donald Trump's golf course expansion.; "Full Frontal Turns One": Bee celebrates Full Frontal's birthday, as the show turns one.; "We Made A Promise" (web extra)

=== Season 2 (2017–18) ===
No. overall	No. in season	Title	Original release date	US viewers (millions)
40	1	"February 15, 2017"	February 15, 2017	1.440
"The Great Unchecked Legislative Fuckfest of 2017"; "Paul Ryan: Portrait in Courage"; "We're Still Not There: A Practical Guide to Resistance": Ashley Nicole Black goes to Washington DC and seeks out five veterans of the Civil Rights Movement.; "A Break from the Apocalypse"; "We Just Have To Get It Right Next Time" (web extra)
41	2	"March 8, 2017"	March 8, 2017	1.420
"That Was the Week that WTF"; "Full Frontal Insta-vestigation: Scott Walker Is A Human Garbage Disposal"; "Long Day's Journey Into CPAC"; "Trumpcare Bill: Nasty, Brutish and Short"
42	3	"March 15, 2017"	March 15, 2017	1.443
"Deepest State"; "Checking in with the #Resistance"; "Full Frontal Is Scared: Bassem Youssef Edition"; "Deepest State Gives Back"; "Steve King Say Anything (Else)" (bonus act)
43	4	"March 22, 2017"	March 22, 2017	1.419
"Trump's Hard Power Budget"; "Dr. Sebastian L. v. Gorka, Trump Whisperer"; "Gamify the News"; "Beekileaks"
44	5	"March 29, 2017"	March 29, 2017	1.373
"Governing Is Hard: Trumpcare Edition"; "Someone Run Against Johnnie Caldwell"; "Government Worked! Rape Kit Backlog Part 2"; "BeekiLeaks 2: Even Leakier"
45	6	"April 5, 2017"	April 5, 2017	1.209
"We Told You So: Russian Hacking"; "Heir to the White House Throne"; "You're! Not! Helping!"; "Yay Men!"
46	7	"Not the White House Correspondents’ Dinner"	April 29, 2017 (Note: This was a special comedy event which aired on Saturday April 29, 2017 at 10:00 p.m. EST on TBS, followed by an uncensored broadcast at 11:00 p.m. on Twitter. It was an hour-long episode, whereas other episodes of the program were a half-hour long.)	1.330
A special comedy event simultaneous with, and spoofing of, the White House Correspondents' Dinner. Segments include: "Cold Open": opens with a parody of a White House style news conference with Allison Janney reprising her role as C. J. Cregg.; "Peaches and Monologue": a musical inrto by Peaches followed by a monologue by Bee.; "Roast of Jeff Zucker": a roast of CNN and its current president Jeff Zucker.; "What Is Facts": a sketch facetiously mixing quantum mechanics with "alternative facts".; "Comedians Roast Trump"; "Fox News In Memoriam": Bee roasts Fox News while calling out Roger Ailes and Bill O'Reilly.; "Jake Tapper": Bee is "interviewed" by Jake Tapper.; "Special Guest George W. Bush": Will Ferrell reprises his Saturday Night Live role as former president George W. Bush.; "Woman in the High Castle": Bee watches a film of herself in an alternate universe, where she is roasting President Hillary Clinton (The Man in the High Castle parody).; "Sammy Bee Roasts the Presidents": Bee roasts presidents; from Woodrow Wilson to Bill Clinton with period-appropriate attire and speech.; "Show Close and Committee to Protect Journalists": Bee announces how much money was raised for the Committee to Protect Journalists, and speaks on the subject of journalistic freedom.; "All The President's Leaks (with Andy Richter)" (web extra)
47	8	"May 10, 2017"	May 10, 2017	1.251
"Our Weekly Constitutional Crisis: Comey Edition"; "Ladies Who Book"; "Miami Rights"; "Next Time, On Full Frontal"; "AHCA: Winners & Die-ers" (bonus act)
48	9	"May 31, 2017"	May 31, 2017	1.234
"Covfefe, Kushner & An Idiot Abroad"; "Gianforte Body-Slammed the Vote"; "Who Will Be Trump's John Dean?"; "Ladies Who Book: Al Franken"; "Dick Cavett Has Some Notes" (web extra)
49	10	"June 7, 2017"	June 7, 2017	1.146
"Keep Calm and Ignore Trump's Tweets"; "The War On Drugs Reboot"; "Just Say No To Drug Test Kits"; "Sammy Bee Live from the '80s"
50	11	"June 14, 2017"	June 14, 2017	1.207
"Sessions's Southern-Fried SnoozeFest"; "Child Brides"; "The Rikers Debaters"; "Our Very First ThunderScout"; "Sessions 'n Cotton's Movie Talk" (web extra)
51	12	"June 21, 2017"	June 21, 2017	1.163
"Georgia, Healthcare, and All The Other Bad Things"; "The Child Victims Act"; "Fantastic Words and Where Not To Find Them"; "Buy Our Books!"
52	13	"June 28, 2017"	June 28, 2017	1.120
"Medicaid's Last Stand"; "ICE Unleashed"; "Persisting 101 with Elizabeth Warren"; "Last Call for Nasty Women"; "Bee & Corddry's Mutual Appreciation Society" (web extra)
53	14	"July 19, 2017"	July 19, 2017	1.113
"Trump's Voter "Integrity" Commission"; "Louie Gohmert's Freestyle History Lesson"; "When Will Trump Get Impeached? Well..."; "More Louie Gohmert Jazz"
54	15	"July 26, 2017"	July 26, 2017	1.281
"The Mooch Will Set Trump Free"; "Trump's Spreading Taint"; "When Michael Met Arthur"; "The Gathering of the MAGA-los"
55	16	"August 2, 2017"	August 2, 2017	1.373
"Sabotaging Obamacare"; "Kris Kobach's Racist Music Man"; "First (And Probably Last Ever) Trump-Positive Field Piece": Bee goes to Kurdistan, where people have a positive view of Trump due to his positions regarding the Syrian Civil War.; "Nasty Women, Meet Cathy Nasty"
56	17	"August 9, 2017"	August 9, 2017	1.265
"Ladies Who Book: Steve Bannon"; "Trump's Terrifying Judicial Appointments"; "Meet The Badass Peshmerga Women"; "Iraqis Who Book": Bee announces that thanks to Turner and Penguin Books, Full Frontal was able to send 10,0000 books and coloring books to the Kurdish displaced person camp that they've visited. She also thanked Green Kids for helping deliver the books to the Kurdish women.
57	18	"September 13, 2017"	September 13, 2017	1.200
"What'd We Miss: Tuggin' Ted, Hurricanes & Humanity"; "A Dreamer Is A Wish Your Trump Takes": Donald Trump rescinds the Deferred Action for Childhood Arrivals.; "Life After Hate"; "Love to the Looky-Loos"
58	19	"September 20, 2017"	September 20, 2017	1.100
"Freedom(ish) Of Speech": while Jemele Hill is vilified for calling Trump a white supremacist, the Insane Clown Posse takes part in a Juggalo march protesting against their fandom being labeled as a gang by the FBI.; "General Kelly v. "Honorable" Omarosa"; "Is There Any Hope For The Left?"; "Call Your Kirsten Gillibrand"
59	20	"September 27, 2017"	September 27, 2017	1.278
"Great Job, C U Next Tuesday!"; "Samantha Bee's Sports Roundup"; "The Federalist Society: Trump's Shit Judge Pipeline"; "Wake Up To Gabe Fleisher"; "Welcome to Sport!"
60	21	"October 4, 2017"	October 4, 2017 (Note: The airing of this episode was delayed on the East Coast till after 01:00 a.m. on October 5, 2017 due to MLB playoffs.)	0.566
"A Primer On Puerto Rico"; "Health Care: How To Make Up A Jacked Up American Quilt"; "Bubby Against Bubby"; "No Solution To Gun Violence?"
61	22	"October 11, 2017"	October 11, 2017	1.211
"Listen Up, Creeps: Weinstein Edition"; "A Penis PSA"; "Abortion, Birth Control, and Other Things Women Don't Need"; "Finnish Fake News"; "¡Atención mujeres desagradables"
62	23	"October 25, 2017"	October 25, 2017	1.090
"A Meditation on Climate Change"; "Natural Disasters: The Greatening (feat. Ingrid Michaelson)"; "Scott Pruitt vs. the World"; "Full Frontal's (Hot As) Hell House"; "Tell the EPA How Much You Like Breathing"
63	24	"November 1, 2017"	November 1, 2017	1.109
"John Kelly is NOT the Adult"; "Close the Boyfriend Loophole"; "The Matrix Has You(r Vote)"; "ThunderCub Ames Mayfield"
64	25	"November 8, 2017"	November 8, 2017	1.149
"Thoughts and Prayers and Literally Anything": includes a performance from the Harlem Gospel Choir.; "Russian Bots and Trolls"; "Schneider-Man"; "Welcome Back, Hope"; "Someday We'll Do More Than Pray" (web extra)
65	26	"November 15, 2017"	November 15, 2017	1.273
"We Can All Do Better Than Roy Moore"; "Meet the Pences"; "Save Tangier Island From Itself": includes an evangelical Christian perspective from atmospheric scientist, Katharine Hayhoe.; "The Future of Comedy"
66	27	"December 6, 2017"	December 6, 2017	1.121
"The Greatest Tax Bill Ever Sold"; "Even More Creeps: Journalist Edition"; "About North Korea"; "Choose (Teen) Life, Alabama"
67	28	"December 13, 2017"	December 13, 2017	1.272
"No Moore!"; "Get A Load of This A-Hole: Zinke"; "La Brigada Feminista"; "Standing Up To Bullies with Kirsten Gillibrand"
68	29	"December 20, 2017"	December 20, 2017	1.095
"Fox & Friend"; "Apocalypse Soon"; "Take Sam To Church": interview with pastor A. R. Bernard of the Christian Cultural Center.; "The War On Christmas On Ice!"
69	30	"January 10, 2018"	January 10, 2018	1.024
"Cold Open: This Is (Still) Our Fight Song": Rachel Platten sings her "Fight Song" in Sam's bathroom.; "Beyond the Fire & Fury"; "No Country For Pregnant Women"; "Road to 2018: Stacey Abrams"; "Time's Up with Amber Tamblyn"; "Let Sam Be Your Mom-Dance-spiration" (web extra)
70	31	"January 17, 2018"	January 17, 2018	1.060
"#MeToo Backlash"; "Full Frontal Investigates: Is This Racist Racist?"; "The Actual Forgotten Working Class"; "Apology Race Check In"
71	32	"January 24, 2018"	January 24, 2018	1.110
"We Need to Talk About Stephen Miller"; "Apology Race Part 1"; "Apology Race Part 2"; "Apology Race Goodbye"
72	33	"January 31, 2018"	January 31, 2018	1.231
"The Actual State of Our Union"; "Forced Arbitration"; "Sam's Rescue Farm for Government Workers"; "Sam's Miss America Audition"

=== Season 3 (2018–19) ===
No. overall	No. in season	Title	Original release date	US viewers (millions)
73	1	"February 7, 2018"	February 7, 2018	1.131
"This Week in Chaos: Nukes"; "This Week in Chaos: Nunes & BIEs"; "Racist Roadshow"; "Black History Spotlight: John Robinson"; "Trump is Bald: An Art Film"
74	2	"March 7, 2018"	March 7, 2018	1.009
"The NRA is a Cult"; "Alt-Right Killers"; "Doug Bruce Ruined Colorado"; "Sneak Peek: The Great American* Puerto Rico. (*It's complicated.)": preview of the March 28th special.
75	3	"March 14, 2018"	March 14, 2018	1.121
"Rex & Mike & Conor & Teens"; "Cy Vance: Technically Legal"; "Elected Prosecutors: Doin' Whatever They Want"; "Sneakier Peek: The Great American* Puerto Rico. (*It's complicated.)"
76	4	"March 21, 2018"	March 21, 2018	1.021
"Firings, Facebook, and (Not-So-Fond) Farewells"; "All You Get Is Birth Control"; "The History Of Women's Pain": with guest Laurie Metcalf.; "Iraq War: 15 Years Later"; "Sneakier Peek: The Great American* Puerto Rico. (*It's complicated.)"
77	5	"The Great American* Puerto Rico. (*It's complicated.)"	March 28, 2018	0.989
"Pre-Show"; "(Go, Go, Go) Go To Puerto Rico": musical number with Javier Muñoz.; "Previously, On Puerto Rico"; "Power to the People"; "Hipster Headquarters: El Local"; "The Truth (About FEMA) Is Out There ": with guest David Duchovny.; "Taller Salud's Reluctant Girl Gang"; "¡Boricua Vota!"; "Statehood: It's Complicated"; "Tax Locusts and Blockchain Bros"; "Teatro Breve Laughs in Darkness"; "Guerrilla Reforestation"; "T-Shirts For and From Puerto Rico": benefiting the Hispanic Federation.
78	6	"April 18, 2018"	April 18, 2018	0.863
"This Week in Bombshells: Comey, Ryan, & Bey"; "It's Not Hard to Hire Women and People of Color"; "People Are Saying: Sean Hannity Is a Serial Killer"; "Medicinal Cannabis For All": with guest Matthew Modine; "Join The #ReeferSanity Army"
79	7	"April 25, 2018"	April 25, 2018	0.953
"Meet Mike Pompeo": Sam sheds light on the background of Trump's Secretary of State, Mike Pompeo.; "Where in the World is Steve Bannon?": A segment dedicated to tracking Steve Bannon's journey through Europe after leaving the Trump administration.; "Bunker Talk: Preet Bharara": An interview with former U.S. attorney.
80	8	"May 2, 2018"	May 2, 2018	0.932
"Greatest Feminists in Feminism Herstory: Sarah Huckabee Sanders"; "Facebook Sucks"; "Don't Be So Sure About That Blue Wave"; "Paul Ryan's Long Tight Five"
81	9	"May 9, 2018"	May 9, 2018	0.868
"Checking In With #MeToo"; "Art of the Iran Deal"; "Return to the Rescue Farm"; "Has Harvey Weinstein Defeated the NRA Yet?"
82	10	"May 23, 2018"	May 23, 2018	0.880
"The Good & The Ugly: Georgia Primaries & Abortion Restrictions"; "Abolish Ice"; "We Will Make You Care About Yemen"; ""No" Problem"
83	11	"May 30, 2018"	May 30, 2018	0.881
"ICE misplaces 1,500 children"; "Rudy Giuliani is on the loose"; "Ashley is on a mission to save democracy in California"
84	12	"June 6, 2018"	June 6, 2018	0.950
"A Message From Sam: Cold Open"; "Missing Migrant Children Update"; "The Texas Conscience"; "Trump's America:" Scott Pruitt, Richard Grenell, and the Self-Pardon.
85	13	"June 13, 2018"	June 13, 2018	0.988
"Canadian Enemies and Nuclear Friends"; "The Myth of Crisis Actors"; "Irish Abortion Referendum"; "Purging Ohio"
86	14	"June 20, 2018"	June 20, 2018	0.934
"A Note From Sam's Dad('s Stand-In)" with Mark Hamill; "Migrant Kids Update: Trump Fixed It!"; "Migrant Kids Update: Trump Broke It!"; "The Cult of Impeachment"; "#WhatIsHannityLookingAt"
87	15	"July 18, 2018"	July 18, 2018	1.029
"ЗДРАВСТВУЙТЕ To Our Mother Russia"; "Goodbye, Roe v. Wade"; "London Welcomes Trump"; "Full Frontal Stands With Montenegro"
88	16	"July 25, 2018"	July 25, 2018	1.005
"The Spy Who Loved the NRA"; "Wait, What Was Watergate Again?"; "Comedians in Cars With Dissidents Getting Coffee"
89	17	"August 1, 2018"	August 1, 2018	0.910
"Q Anon, Printable Guns, & Other Pure Nonsense Words"; "Male Sexual Abuse Isn't Funny"; "Asgardia: The Real Space Nation"; "Grannies Respond"
90	18	"August 8, 2018"	August 8, 2018	0.905
"Bad Boy Roundup: Manafort & Don Jr."; "Pregnancy Discrimination"; "Crashing Sean Spicer's Book Tour"; "Space Force Anthem"
91	19	"August 15, 2018"	August 15, 2018	0.809
"Fascists To Watch 2018"; "Undocumented Immigrants Make Your Food"; "Brandi Carlile Performs Hold Out Your Hand"; "Burn It Down, My Witches"
92	20	"August 22, 2018"	August 22, 2018	0.949
"#MeToo Is Coming For You"; "Gretchen Carlson & Forced Arbitration"; "Elizabeth Warren"; "Burn It Down, My Witches"
93	21	"September 12, 2018"	September 12, 2018	0.903
"Sam Fixes America Big-League in New Title Sequence"; "Minority Rule"; "Gamify the Midterms: Can We Reward You For Voting"; "Gamify the Midterms: Can We Make A Good App"
94	22	"September 19, 2018"	September 19, 2018	0.939
"Brett Kavanaugh: No More Nineties Reboots"; "The Case for Universal Health Care"; "The Case for Even More Universal Health Care"; "Chuck Jones Will Kick Your Ass"
95	23	"September 26, 2018"	September 26, 2018	0.871
"Sam Goes Full Carrie Over Kavanaugh"; "His So-Called Ruined Life: Brett Kavanaugh"; "Revenge of the Cheerleaders"
96	24	"October 17, 2018"	October 17, 2018	0.673
"Culture Wars: Episode 69"; "Voter Suppression"; "The No-Wave Wave"; "Get Rich or Save Democracy Tryin'"
97	25	"October 24, 2018"	October 24, 2018	0.863
"Asylum Seekers Aren't Scary"; "Trans Rights Under Attack"; "The Rainbow Wave is Coming"
98	26	"October 31, 2018"	October 31, 2018	0.812
"We Need To Talk About Anti-Semitism"; "Steve King is the Racist-est"; "Larry Krasner: Finally a Good DA?"
99	27	"November 5, 2018"	November 5, 2018	0.627
"Vote, Dummies!"; "Support Your Local Races"; "Get Your Fudgin' Money Out of My Democracy!"
100	28	"November 7, 2018"	November 7, 2018	0.956
"That Went Okay!"; "Stacey Abrams V. Everybody"; "Meanwhile in Texas"
101	29	"December 5, 2018"	December 5, 2018	0.897
"Mueller? Mueller?"; "White Collar Crime"; "GLUE: Gorgeous Ladies Unionizing Everyone"
102	30	"December 12, 2018"	December 12, 2018	0.944
"Birth of a Fox Nation"; "Democracy: A Retrospective"; "This American Trash: Voter Suppression in Georgia"
103	31	"December 19, 2018"	December 19, 2018	0.929
"Christmas on I.C.E."
104	32	"January 23, 2019"	January 23, 2019	0.864
"Shutdown Shutdown"; "Women for President"; "The Masked Federal Worker"
105	33	"January 30, 2019"	January 30, 2019	0.820
"Roger Stone: America's Athlete's Foot"; "Military Spending"; "Stop Doing That! With Nyle DiMarco"

=== Season 4 (2019–20) ===
No. overall	No. in season	Title	Original release date	US viewers (millions)
106	1	"February 6, 2019"	February 6, 2019	0.903
"State of the Union"; "Invading Venezuela"; "Great Moments in Black History"
107	2	"February 13, 2019"	February 13, 2019	0.979
"The Green New Deal"; "The Truth About Obesity"; "Billionaires Not Wanted"; "So Long, Ashley Nicole Black"
108	3	"March 6, 2019"	March 6, 2019	0.875
"The Sacklers Spend Their Blood Money"; "Fox Lurvs the Trump White House"; "Brexit"
109	4	"March 13, 2019"	March 13, 2019	0.801
"Tucker Carlson: White Supremacist?"; "Ilan Omar"; "#MeToons"
110	5	"March 20, 2019"	March 20, 2019	0.919
"All the Pretty Dems"; "Attack of the Zombie Muslim Ban"; "Black Future Month"
111	6	"March 27, 2019"	March 27, 2019	N/A
"Collusion Delusion"; "Mick Mulvaney: Magically Malicious"; "Immigrant Soldiers"
112	7	"April 3, 2019"	April 3, 2019	N/A
"The Race to Overturn Roe"; "Fighting Anti-Vax Ignorance"; "White at the Museum"; "Diversity in Statuary"
113	8	"April 10, 2019"	April 10, 2019	N/A
"Trump Wants More Family Separation"; "Fifty Cons of Way"; "Yemeni Refugees"
114	9	"Not the White House Correspondents' Dinner 2019"	April 27, 2019	N/A
Sigourney Weaver Saves Journalism; Saweetie Raps & WHCD's Collapse; Horny for Good Journalism; Honorary Journalism Honor Award Honors; In Memoriam to White House Press Briefings; Balance v. Truth with Snooki and Alex Honnold; Racism is Racist with Brandon Victor Dixon; Conservative Comedian Zam Larson (Taran Killam); Deep Fakes; The Roast of Donald Trump; Robert De Niro Wants You To Donate
115	10	"May 8, 2019"	May 8, 2019	N/A
"Trump: Biggest Loser"; "NRA Meltdown"; "Black Twitter"
116	11	"May 15, 2019"	May 15, 2019	N/A
117	12	"May 22, 2019"	May 22, 2019	N/A
118	13	"June 12, 2019"	June 12, 2019	N/A
119	14	"June 19, 2019"	June 19, 2019	N/A
A Message to Democratic Presidential Candidates: Run; Mitch McConnell: Dry Rot of Democracy; How To Take Reparations From The Hypothetical To Reality!; US Women's Soccer: Just Pay Them Already!
120	15	"June 26, 2019"	June 26, 2019	N/A
How to Cover Sexual Assault Allegations Against the President; How US Meddling in Central America Created the Modern Day Border Crisis; A Debate Showdown in South Beach; Goodbye, Huck-a-bot
121	16	"July 17, 2019"	July 17, 2019	N/A
A Rundown of Trump’s Racist Racisms; Jeffrey Epstein’s Got Friends in High Places; The Late Shrill with Samantha Bee (feat. Tammy Duckworth)
122	17	"July 24, 2019"	July 24, 2019	N/A
Sam's Audition For CATS!; The Mueller Hearings: The Movie; How To Get Away With Widespread Election Interference...Again!; The Border Can Be Fun!; It's Time To Use The Comments Section for Good!
123	18	"July 31, 2019"	July 31, 2019	N/A
Student Loan Debt: It’s Not Just For Millennials Anymore!; Decriminalizing migration is not open borders ft. Julián Castro; Kentucky Wants to Break Up with Mitch McConnell
124	19	"August 7, 2019"	August 7, 2019	N/A
Just Another Terrible, Horrible, No Good, Very Bad Week of Gun Violence; A Reminder to Our Government That White Supremacist Violence is Terrorism; How To Get Your Head(lines) Right; Spring Breakers: Young Voter Edition feat. Allana Harkin
125	20	"August 14, 2019"	August 14, 2019	N/A
Full Frontal Investigates: The Case of Jerry Falwell, Jr., the Pool Boy, Michael Cohen, & Tom Arnold; Sticky Fingers, Sticky Conversations: BBQ and Reproductive Justice; Betty Who Gives Us One Last Summer Bop
126	21	"September 11, 2019"	September 11, 2019	N/A
We're Gonna Need a Bigger Vote Featuring Josh Charles; Here's How Taxpayers are Funding Trump's Resorts; It’s Time to Cancel the Electoral College; The Well-Documented Case of Trump’s Undocumented Employees; What's Up With Rudy Giuliani's 9/11 Tribute Video?
127	22	"September 18, 2019"	September 18, 2019	N/A
Full Frontal’s Second Annual Brett Kavanaugh Remembrance Act; Meet the Rich: The Koch Brothers; The Founding Fathers Were Not Gods; Dancing Around The Consequences
128	23	"September 25, 2019"	September 25, 2019	N/A
HERE FOR IT: Ukraine and the Trump Impeachment Inquiry; Greta Thunberg: The GOP’s Teenage Climate Nemesis; Boris Is Proof That Britain Needs A Constitution
129	24	"October 2, 2019"	October 2, 2019	N/A
Impeachment: Trump Has Officially Gone Off the Deep End; Mike Pence Takes HHS To The Past; Ilhan Omar: Impeachment Pioneer
130	25	"October 23, 2019"	October 23, 2019	N/A
Origin Story: Peter Schweizer and the Biden/Ukraine Conspiracy; Why Foster Care is Broken and How to Fix it; Wow! Not All Ohio Voters Are White Guys In Diners!; Too Much Pumpkin Spice
131	26	"October 30, 2019"	October 30, 2019	N/A
Witches Need Birth Control, Too; It's Complicated: Revenge Porn and the Katie Hill Controversy; Big Little Lies: Instagram’s Sponsored Content Problem; Organ Donation: An American Horror Story; Meet The Badasses Who Roasted Harvey Weinstein
132	27	"November 6, 2019"	November 6, 2019	N/A
Local Elections 2019: Thank you, Kentucky! We love you, Virginia!; He’s Loaded: How the Trump Re-election Campaign Raised So Much Money; Scaling The Border: The Not-So-Great Wall of America; MSNBC’s Ali Velshi’s Walk of Shame
133	28	"November 13, 2019"	November 13, 2019	N/A
Trump’s Impeachment Hearings Aren’t Going Well...If You’re Trump; It’s Paula’s White House; Columbus Day Should Be Indigenous Peoples Day ft. Congresswoman Deb Haaland; Will Trump Get Booed? Veterans Edition!
134	29	"November 20, 2019"	November 20, 2019	N/A
Impeachment Hearings: All The President’s Men Colluded; Stephen Miller Is Garbage And Needs To Be Fired Immediately; A #MeToo Thanksgiving; Full Frontal’$ Totally Unrigged Primary Game is HERE!
135	30	"December 11, 2019"	December 11, 2019	N/A
Donald Trump and the Articles of Impeachment; The White House Hates Food Stamps; The Sammies: Awards for Government Workers; Marriage Story: The Hateful Edition
136	31	"December 18, 2019"	December 18, 2019	N/A
An Impeachment Carol; ‘Tis Impeachment Season; Why Are People Protesting in Hong Kong?
137	32	"January 15, 2020"	January 15, 2020	0.672
Sam Discovers She Has 2020 Vision; Democratic Debate: Drama In Iowa; Sexism In Country Music; Margo Price Performs "Stone Me"; We Need To Talk About Tom Steyer’s Tie
138	33	"January 22, 2020"	January 22, 2020	0.746
The Impeachment Trial: Show Us Parnas’ Receipts; Paid Parental Leave Is Good For Business; Iran Explainer with Gissou Nia & Michael Bennet
139	34	"January 29, 2020"	January 29, 2020	0.754
Coronavirus Is Scary! CDC Budget Cuts Make It Scarier; Are Republicans Being Shadow Banned? (No); Is The Iowa Caucus A Relic of the Past?; Hey! It’s Mike Bloomberg's $10M Superbowl Ad!

=== Season 5 (2020) ===
Season 5 was affected by the COVID-19 pandemic. Starting with the 25 March 2020 episode, filming was done outside of the studio, without an audience, in the woods near Samantha Bee's home, with her husband Jason Jones as her cameraman and additional voices, and her family as the filming crew. These episodes were called "Little Show in the Big Woods", having been filmed in the woods outside her home.

No. overall	No. in season	Title	Original release date	US viewers (millions)
140	1	"February 5, 2020"	February 5, 2020	0.732
The State of Our Union is BAD; Dental Care IS Health Care; The Art Of Health Care Haggling; Someone Needs To Check on Steve Kornacki
141	2	"February 12, 2020"	February 12, 2020	0.949
President Trump's Revenge Tour; Prager U Wants You! (To Become a Conservative); Meet the Impeachment Managers; We Gave Andrew Yang $50K. Here's What Happened Next.
142	3	"March 4, 2020"	March 4, 2020	0.864
Have Yourself A Merry Super Tuesday!; Health Care Sharing Ministries ARE NOT Health Insurance!; Holding Out for a Super Tuesday Hero; Learn To Wash Your Hands The Right Way with Samantha Bee
143	4	"March 11, 2020"	March 11, 2020	0.655
Coronavirus is Not an Excuse to Be Racist; America's Gig-Based Economy Gets Zero Stars; Don’t Mess With Texas: The Longhorn State's Tussle with Trump's Border Wall; Rot In Hell, Harvey; Smurferize the Coronavirus
144	5	"March 25, 2020"	March 25, 2020	0.861
A Message From Samantha Bee; COVID-19 Is the World's Worst Coworker; The Episode of ER No One Asked To Be A Part Of; The Furries Are On to Something; Wanna Play a Game?
145	6	"April 1, 2020"	April 1, 2020	0.821
Sam Vs. Wild; Introducing: Coronavirus For Her!; The 2020 Election: What Do You Have To Lose?; Stay Home and Fill Out Your 2020 Census!; There IS Crying in Baseball...And Everywhere Else
146	7	"April 8, 2020"	April 8, 2020	0.738
73 Q's with Samantha Bee; The Trump Administration Isn't Social Distancing From Its Usual B.S.; How to Legislate From Home with Rep. Katie Porter; Live From Sam's Shed... It's Jewel!; Sam Nails the Getty Museum Art Challenge
147	8	"April 15, 2020"	April 15, 2020	0.819
Sam's Kids Dye Her Hair; This Week in "Things That Shouldn’t Surprise Us": COVID-19 Is Extremely Racist; The Elizabeth Warren Emergency Reassurance Zoom; Michael Lewis Explains Why We Should Have Seen The Pandemic Coming
148	9	"April 22, 2020"	April 22, 2020	0.871
Our Hospital Workers Need PPE...STAT!; Live From Sam's Shed... It's Mt. Joy!; Pandemic Pets Should Have A "No Return Policy"; Why We Need To Shut Down The Idea Of Reopening America; Sam's Nature Gym
149	10	"April 29, 2020"	April 29, 2020	0.645
Samantha Bee: Bird Expert; Why We Need To Save The Postal Service; Trying to Keep Up with Kamala Harris; Live From Sam's Shed... It's MILCK!; The Birds (and the Bee)
150	11	"May 6, 2020"	May 6, 2020	0.618
Sam's Coronavirus Time Capsule; The Things We Should Have Been Doing All Along! Brought to You By Coronavirus; How to Homeschool During a Pandemic; Live From Sam's Shed... It's Vanessa Carlton!
151	12	"May 13, 2020"	May 13, 2020	0.699
Sam Gives Us the Pep Talk We All Need; How Coronavirus is Starving The Nation; RoboSam and the Rise of Telemedicine; Reimagining The Nation Post-Pandemic
152	13	"June 10, 2020"	June 10, 2020	0.812
America's Long-Standing Tradition of Police Brutality; It's Time to Defund the Police; Legislating Healing and Justice with Ayanna Pressley; Put Your Money Where Your Mouth Is: Donate to A Bail Fund!
153	14	"June 17, 2020"	June 17, 2020	0.645
The Republican Campaign of Voter Suppression; Who Runs The World? Apparently This Guy. Meet Reference Man; Live From Sam's Shed... It's Dirty Projectors!; It's Time For a Fair Fight!
154	15	"June 24, 2020"	June 24, 2020	0.779
Black Trans Lives Matter; Violence Against Trans Women of Color; Tarana Burke on the Connection Between Police Brutality and Sexual Violence; Olympic Athletes Show Us How to Declare Victory Over Pandemic Fatigue
155	16	"July 1, 2020"	July 1, 2020	0.630
Trump Attacks Our Nation's Free Press; Mike Brown Learns How to Do the Uprising Thing; Live From Sam's Shed... It's Silversun Pickups!; How To Save The Postal Service
156	17	"July 15, 2020"	July 15, 2020	0.707
The Dangerous Spread of Mask Hysteria; The Homophobic History of Blood Donation; Why Metallica's Lars Ulrich is Feeding America
157	18	"July 22, 2020"	July 22, 2020	0.702
Sam Makes a Splash; Deniers, Dimwits, and Lies: How Governors Have Responded to the Pandemic; From Hopeless to Hope-ish with Masha Gessen; Live From Sam's Shed... It's MisterWives!; Sam Offers Some Name Alternatives For Racist Sports Teams
158	19	"August 19, 2020"	August 19, 2020	0.569
Sam Sheds a Tear with Paul McCartney and Ringo Starr; Expect the Worst From This Election Season; Broken News: There's A Race Problem in Journalism; Sylvan Esso Performs "Ferris Wheel"; We Will Always Love You, Dolly Parton
159	20	"August 26, 2020"	August 26, 2020	0.736
The Republican Party's Fall Look: Fringe!; Full Frontal's The Amazing Disgrace: Our Country's Racist Symbols; What It Means To Be Progressive With Pramila Jayapal; WickerSam
160	21	"September 2, 2020"	September 2, 2020	0.742
The Police and White Militias; How Marginalizing Women's Health Created A Market For Pseudoscience Products; Election Night Simulation: What Happens In A Contested Election?
161	22	"September 9, 2020"	September 9, 2020	0.684
Sam's Election Day Countdown; Trump's Politicization of the COVID-19 Vaccine; Is It Vaccine Season, Yet?; Why Police Aren't Protecting Our Kids in School
162	23	"September 16, 2020"	September 16, 2020	0.641
A Night of (One) Stars; The Importance of Down Ballot Races; From Memes To Movement: Is Instagram Activism Getting Us Anywhere?; Black Pumas Perform "Colors"!; It's Time to Work Those Polls!
163	24	"September 23, 2020"	September 23, 2020	0.549
How We Can Protect The Notorious Legacy of RBG; It's About Time We Banned Private Detention Centers; Predicting the Republican's 2020 October Surprise; Help Floridians Vote!
164	25	"September 30, 2020"	September 30, 2020	0.584
Post-Debate, Sam’s Gone Wild; Sam Responds To The First (And God, Not The Last??) 2020 Presidential "Debate"; How The School Choice Debate Is Failing Our Public Schools; This Women's Roller Derby League Made A Better COVID-19 Plan Than Trump
165	26	"October 21, 2020"	October 21, 2020	0.660
Debating Sam-antics; The Nightmare Before Election Day; Samantha Bee's Panel of Losers; Full Frontal Presents: The Worst Four Years Ever; The Declaration of Incompetence
166	27	"October 28, 2020"	October 28, 2020	0.559
The Witches' Zoom; The Last Free and Fair Election?; Now That's What I Call A F*cking Atrocity: Family Separation, Vol. 239; Getting Through the Maze of Pennsylvanian Voter Values; PLEASE VOTE!
167	28	"November 4, 2020"	November 4, 2020	0.749
Election 2020: Sam's Going Back In; Election 2020: The Results Are In! Kind of...Wait, Are They? What's Going On??; James Monroe Inglehart Wants You To "Make Them Hear You"; Sam's World(s) feat. Juliana Hatfield; A Humble Balloon Drop
168	29	"November 11, 2020"	November 11, 2020	0.685
Biden Won The Election! Now The Fight Against Trumpism Begins; Undoing the Damage of Trump's Immigration Policies; Why Progressives Continue to Win with Jamaal Bowman; Thank You, Nevada!
169	30	"November 18, 2020"	November 18, 2020	N/A
It Was Rigged All Along!; A Very COVID Thanksgiving; How Leticia James Is Holding Trump Accountable; Infinity Song Performs "Mad Love"!; Georgia's Runoff Races: Keep These Orgs and Georgia On Your Mind!
170	31	"December 9, 2020"	December 9, 2020	N/A
Donald Trump Is Giving Out Pardons For Christmas; America's New Year Resolution: Making Housing a Human Right; The Unwavering Optimism of Cori Bush
171	32	"December 16, 2020"	December 16, 2020	0.606
Get Out The Way, Ludacris Is Here!; Why Georgia? How the Georgia Runoffs Came To Be And Why They’re So Important; The Mitch Who Stole Justice: Featuring Jon Ossoff; Allana Harkin Wants To Know What's On Georgia's Mind; A Merry LudaChristmas To All!

=== Season 6 (2021) ===
No. overall	No. in season	Title	Original release date	US viewers (millions)
172	1	"January 13, 2021"	January 13, 2021	0.68
It's a Little Too Late For Republicans To Denounce Trump; Samm Henshaw Performs "All Good"!; It Shouldn't Have Taken An Insurrection For Social Media To Block Trump; Congratulations, Georgia!
173	2	"January 20, 2021"	January 20, 2021	0.55
Democrats: They (Can Finally) Get The Job Done!; Samantha Bee Cleaning: White House Edition; Full Frontal Daytime Edition!; Sam's Inaugural Ball
174	3	"January 27, 2021"	January 27, 2021	0.70
Vaccinating America: Biden Cleans Up Trump's Mess; Fuck The Pandas: Ugly Animals Deserve Your Attention Too; Here's Why Giuliani Needs To Be Disbarred; Space Force's Greatest Hits
175	4	"February 3, 2021"	February 3, 2021	0.70
The Stonk Market: 2008 All Over Again?; Environmental Racism: How It Started vs. How It's Going; Whose PPP Loan Is It, Anyway?; A Super Bowl Halftime Poem
176	5	"February 10, 2021"	February 10, 2021	0.58
The Racist Past (And Present!) Of Greek Life; The Treatment of Peaceful Protesters vs. Violent Insurrectionists; The Fight For A $15 Minimum Wage; Be More Like Jimmy Smits (as Dr. Fauci) and Wear a Mask!
177	6	"March 3, 2021"	March 3, 2021	0.54
Hate Monger Of The Week: Marjorie Taylor Greene; Women, COVID, and the Myth of Having It All; The Allegations Against Andrew Cuomo and Why We Hold Elected Officials Accountable
178	7	"March 10, 2021"	March 10, 2021	0.52
Meet The White Women Empowering QAnon; How Local Barbers Are Getting The Black Community to Trust the Covid Vaccine; Sister Duo Aly & AJ Perform Listen!
180	9	"March 24, 2021"	March 24, 2021	N/A
The Real March Madness? NCAA's Treatment of Female Athletes; The Cyberattacks Plaguing America's Hospitals; If There's Hope for Atlantic City, There's Hope for America...Maybe?; BBC News Cameras Capture The Joys Of Remote-Working Technology
181	10	"April 14, 2021"	April 14, 2021	N/A
Attacks on the Asian American Community; Hollywood's Walk of Shame: The History of Asian Stereotypes in Pop Culture
182	11	"April 21, 2021"	April 21, 2021	N/A
Washington D.C. Needs to (Puff Puff) Pass Marijuana Legalization; Sam Gives Full Frontal the Presidential Treatment; Reality Winner: The Story of an NSA Whistleblower as told by Samantha Bee
183	12	"April 28, 2021"	April 28, 2021	0.51
President Biden Needs To End Trump-Era Immigration Policies; Why Washington, D.C. Deserves To Be A State
184	13	"May 5, 2021"	May 5, 2021	N/A
Matt Gaetz and The Republican Double Standard; Republican Attacks on Trans Athletes Are Escalating; It's Time to Call Out Connecticut for Prison Phone Costs
185	14	"May 12, 2021"	May 12, 2021	0.59
Do One F@%king Thing About Guns!!; Gun Violence Is A Public Health Crisis; Gun Control is a Local Issue ft. Shannon Watts, Moms Demand Action; Full Frontal Wants To Make Guns Uncool; Full Frontal Uses Gun Regulations To Build a Car; Forget Guns, What About Swords?; We Can End Gun Violence
186	15	"June 2, 2021"	June 2, 2021	N/A
Why No Progressive Agenda Can Survive the Senate Filibuster; Here's Why Your Gas Stove Is Killing You; How (And Why) Black Voter Rights Are Under Attack (Again)
187	16	"June 9, 2021"	June 9, 2021	N/A
Sam Bee and Steve Buscemi Do Crowd Work To Prep For A Live Audience; We Need To Talk About The Intersex Experience; How "No Promo Homo" Laws Target Sex Ed in Arizona; Shungudzo Performs "There's only so much a soul can take"; Where in the World is Steven Seagal('s Career?)
188	17	"June 16, 2021"	June 16, 2021	N/A
What Are Conservatives Screaming About Today? Critical Race Theory!; We Can't Rely on the Supreme Court to Protect LGBTQ+ Rights; VINCINT Delivers a Special Pride Performance of "Higher"; Juneteenth Dos And Don'ts for (White) People
189	18	"June 23, 2021"	June 23, 2021	0.45
Sam's New Body Double: June Diane Raphael!; Gov. Ron DeSantis Could Be Our Next Presidential Nightmare; The Weight Loss Industry is Attacking Our Post-Pandemic Bodies; New York's Feeling the Consequences of the 2020 Census
190	19	"June 30, 2021"	June 30, 2021	0.49
Sam Leaves the House and Heads to... Rwanda?; How Rwanda Makes Conservation Work for its Community; Rwandans and the UNHCR Are Treating Refugees with Empathy; Get the RwandaVision VR Experience
191	20	"September 1, 2021"	September 1, 2021	0.60
Racist and Sexist School Dress Codes Continue to Fail Students; It's Time To Take Responsibility For What We've Done in Afghanistan; Tenacious Unicorn Ranch Is Pioneering a New and Queer Wild West; Let Samantha Bee Host Jeopardy!; Fuck You, Texas
192	21	"September 8, 2021"	September 8, 2021	0.45
What Texas's New Abortion Ban Means For Reproductive Rights Across the Country; Charity Dean Predicted the Pandemic. Here's What She Thinks Is Next.; A Salute to Petty TikTok Teens; Sam Bee's Not-Solved Mysteriez: UFOs
193	22	"September 15, 2021"	September 15, 2021	0.46
What Republicans Get Wrong About Vaccine Mandates; Getting Vaccinated Doesn't Take (Your) Balls; Vivian Howard: The Perfect Recipe for Combating Climate Change; What American Citizens Can Do To Help Afghanistan; Food Waste and Climate Change: How Your Leftovers Can Save the World
194	23	"September 22, 2021"	September 22, 2021	0.39
Late Night Hosts Unite for Climate Change; Greg Gutfeld Wasn't Invited To #ClimateNight; Climate Change's Dirty Little Secret: Sewage; What We Should Learn From the California Recall Election; Sam Shreds Climate Night; The Midterms are Only 411 Days Away: Holy Shit!
195	24	"September 29, 2021"	September 29, 2021	0.50
New Jersey Is Paving The Way For Reproductive Rights; Full Frontal Welcomes (Most Of) You to NYC!; TikTok Misinformation is Spreading and it's #Dangerous; Check Out "Full Release" While We're Away!
196	25	"October 27, 2021"	October 27, 2021	0.50
Invasion of the Bee Snatchers; How the Funeral Industry Continues to Profit Off the Cost of Dying; Haunted House Labor Shortage: Where Have All The Ghouls Gone?; Sleigh Bells Perform Live In-Studio!; Putting the FUN Back In Funeral: the Death Positivity Movement
197	26	"November 3, 2021"	November 3, 2021	0.45
How Amy Klobuchar is Taking on Big Tech For You; How Celebrities Perpetuate the False (and Dangerous!) Myth of Anti-Aging; These Supreme Court Decisions Could Decide the Future of Abortion Rights
198	27	"November 10, 2021"	November 10, 2021	0.58
Mike Rubens Finds Out Why America is Losing Its Religion; Republicans' Meltdown Over Big Bird; Dun Dun: The Truth About Your Favorite Crime Shows; Passing the Infrastructure Bill was a Huge Win. Let's Celebrate!
199	28	"November 17, 2021"	November 17, 2021	0.53
We Need to Save the Postal Service - Here is How We Do It!; Tough Love or Abuse?: The Troubling Truth Behind the "Troubled Teen Industry"; Steve Bannon Taken Into Custody; Guilt Trip 2021: What Vaccine Mandates Mean For The Holidays
200	29	"December 8, 2021"	December 8, 2021	0.54
Sam Gets a Tattoo For Our 200th Episode!; Sam's Touching Tribute to Her Staff and Fans; SCOTUS: Where Reproductive Rights Go to Die; Sam Bee's Reproductive Justice Escape "Womb" Feat. Busy Philipps; The Dangers of the Supreme Court Shadow Docket
201	30	"December 15, 2021"	December 15, 2021	0.56
J. Roddy Walston Performs "Christmas Tonight!"; How Our Culture of "Fast and Free Returns!" is Not So Free; Sam Modernizes a Christmas Classic; Mark Meadows is Having a VERY Bad Week; The Met Sacks the Sacklers

=== Season 7 (2022) ===
No. overall	No. in season	Title	Original release date	US viewers (millions)
202	1	"January 20, 2022"	January 20, 2022	0.28
Biden's 1st Year as POTUS: The Yays and Mehs; Insurrection Investigation Committee Reveals GOP's Batshit Plan To Overturn 2020 Election; Put Down Your Pandemic Pet: We've Got a COVID Mental Health Crisis; Joshua Henry Performs "Guarantee" In-Studio!
203	2	"January 27, 2022"	January 27, 2022	N/A
Sam Comes To Terms with the Future of Full Frontal; Kyrsten Sinema: A Pain In The Butt For Years; The Semi-Domestic Threat of Cat Misinformation Videos; Your Favorite Songs Are Written By White Men
204	3	"February 3, 2022"	February 3, 2022	0.30
Rage Against the 2022 GOP Midterm Machine; But God Didn't Say That: Religious Community Members Talk God and Abortion; Ariana and the Rose Performs "Every Body"; Oh, Canada... WTF?
205	4	"February 10, 2022"	February 10, 2022	0.30
How Conservative Book Bans Don't Protect Kids; Power Naps: Black America's Struggle To Sleep
206	5	"February 17, 2022"	February 17, 2022	N/A
The GOP's Favorite Racist Rhetoric: The War on Drugs; SAND: The Sexiest Topic We've Ever Covered; Allana Harkin Goes to the Super Bowl to Talk Politics; Olympic Committee Wins Gold Medal For Bullshit
207	6	"March 10, 2022"	March 10, 2022	N/A
208	7	"March 31, 2022"	March 31, 2022	N/A
The Spy Who Called Me: Alexander Vindman and the Call That Sparked the Russian War on Ukraine; What Recent HBCU Bomb Threats Say About the State of Racism in America; New Evidence From the January 6th Investigation Continues Not to Disappoint; Mick Mulvaney Joins CBS News As Paid Political Commentator
209	8	"April 7, 2022"	April 7, 2022	N/A
The GOP: Everyone Who Disagrees With Us Is a Pedophile; Amanda Palmer Performs "Judy Blume"; Republican's Midterm Strategy: Don't Say Gay
210	9	"April 14, 2022"	April 14, 2022	N/A
The Manipulative Midterm Email Scam Already Hit Your Inbox; Kyrsten Sinema: A Tragedy of Her Own Making; The Sleep Wellness Industry Is Trying To Sell You The Weirdest Shit; Sam's Take: JLo and Ben's Engagement 2.0
211	10	"April 21, 2022"	April 21, 2022	N/A
Horse Girls Activate: Wild Horses Are Under Attack and We're Paying For It!; UPSAHL performs "Lunatic"; Tucker Carlson's Cock Doc and the Far Right's Bogus "War on Masculinity"; Sam's Take: Alex Jones Files For Bankruptcy
212	11	"April 28, 2022"	April 28, 2022	N/A
Full Frontal's Spring '22 Fashion Report: Reusable Tote Bags; The Case For Universal Free Lunch; Mark Meadows' 2,319 Texts Are Absolutely Bonkers; Sam Gets a "New" Podium. Turns Out, It Was Cake.
213	12	"May 19, 2022"	May 19, 2022	N/A
Sam and Dr. Jen Gunter Talk Menopause; Why Are We Not Talking About Menopause?; Women! *Now With Fewer Rights
214	13	"May 26, 2022"	May 26, 2022	0.23
Congress Has the Power to Stop Mass Shootings; Peaches Performs "Fuck the Pain Away"; If Nurses Are Fucked, We're Fucked
215	14	"June 2, 2022"	June 2, 2022	0.18
How the NRA Went From Responsible Gun Organization to Politically-Motivated Liars; Bad Timing: 2022 NRA Convention; Fancy Hagood Performs "Bored"; Sam's Take: Hot Dog Truck Crash
216	15	"June 9, 2022"	June 9, 2022	N/A
Samantha in Paris - Part 1 of 3; What's Next For America’s Embarrassingly Weak Gun Laws?; Trans Youth Are Under Attack; Masha Gessen Talks Russia's War on Ukraine
217	16	"June 16, 2022"	June 16, 2022	N/A
Samantha Still in Paris; January 6th Hearings Episode 1 Recap; January 6th Hearings Episode 2 Recap; The Hell and Horror of Giving Birth While Black
218	17	"June 23, 2022"	June 23, 2022	N/A
Sam On Roe…with Covid; Is Samantha Ever Leaving Paris?; Glitter is Killing What's Left of Earth's Sparkle; Abortions on Federal Lands

== See also ==
- Not the White House Correspondents’ Dinner
