= Primetime Emmy Award for Outstanding Short Form Nonfiction or Reality Series =

Television award category

- Awarded for: Outstanding Short Form Nonfiction or Reality Series
- Country: United States
- Presented by: Academy of Television Arts & Sciences
- First award: 2011
- Currently held by: Inside the Pitt (2026)
- Website: emmys.com

The Primetime Emmy Award for Outstanding Short Form Nonfiction or Reality Series is an award presented to short-format unscripted television programs.

== History ==
The category was created in 2011, and was originally titled Outstanding Special Class – Short-Format Nonfiction Programs. It was renamed to its current title in 2016, alongside Outstanding Short Form Comedy or Drama Series and Outstanding Short Form Variety Series, which replaced the category for Outstanding Short-Format Live-Action Entertainment Program.

== Winners and nominations ==
Indicates the winner

=== 2010s ===
Outstanding Special Class — Short-Format Nonfiction Programs

Year	Program	Producers	Network
2011 (63rd)
2011 (63rd)	Jay Leno's Garage	Jay Leno, Helga Pollock and Robert Angelo, producers	jaylenosgarage.com
2011 (63rd)	Writer's Draft	Brian Katkin, executive producer; Raphael Kryszek, producer	Fox Movie Channel
2012 (64th)
2012 (64th)	DGA: Moments in Time	Michael Stevens, producer	dga.org
2012 (64th)	Bravo's Top Chef: Last Chance Kitchen	David Serwatka, Dan Cutforth, Jane Lipsitz, Lisa Hsia and Aimee Viles, produced by	BravoTV.com
2012 (64th)	Jay Leno's Garage	Jay Leno, executive producer; Helga Pollock and Robert Angelo, producers	jaylenosgarage.com
2012 (64th)	Thank a Vet	Kathleen Williams, executive producer; Jaimie DeFina, senior producer; Andrea Allen, Glenn Schubert and Eric Berger, producers	History
2012 (64th)	30 Rock: Ask Tina	Tina Fey, Eric Gurian, Nick Bernardone, Clint Koltveit and William Sell, producers	NBC.com
2013 (65th)
2013 (65th)	Remembering 9/11	Kathleen Williams, executive producer; Sean Kennedy, producer	History.com
2013 (65th)	Comedians in Cars Getting Coffee	Jerry Seinfeld, producer	Crackle.com
2013 (65th)	Jay Leno's Garage	Jay Leno, Helga Pollock, Robert Angelo, Kico Velarde, Robert Hayes and David Swift, producers	jaylenosgarage.com
2013 (65th)	The Office: The Farewells	John Krasinski, Carole Angelo and Daniel Stessen, producers	NBC.com
2013 (65th)	30 Rock: The Final Season	Tina Fey, Eric Gurian, Nick Bernardone, Clint Koltveit, William Sell and Carole Angelo, producers	NBC.com
2013 (65th)	Top Chef: Last Chance Kitchen	David Serwatka, Ashley Kaplan, Dan Cutforth, Jane Lipsitz, Lisa Hsia and Aimee Viles, produced by	BravoTV.com
2014 (66th)
2014 (66th)	30 for 30 Shorts	Connor Schell, John Dahl, Bill Simmons and Maura Mandt, executive producers; Dan Silver and Tate Donovan, producers	ESPN
2014 (66th)	Comedians in Cars Getting Coffee	Jerry Seinfeld, executive producer	Crackle.com
2014 (66th)	Cosmos: A National Geographic Deeper Dive	Allan Butler, executive producer; Christina Ricchiuti, producer	National Geographic
2014 (66th)	I Was There: Boston Marathon Bombings	Kathleen Williams and Sean Kennedy, executive producers; Jaimie DeFina, senior producer	History.com
2014 (66th)	Jay Leno's Garage	Jay Leno, executive producer; Kico Velarde, supervising producer; Helga Pollock, Robert Hayes, David Swift and Walker Dalton, producers	NBC.com
2014 (66th)	Park Bench with Steve Buscemi	Steve Buscemi, Stanley Tucci, Wren Arthur, Justin Wilkes, Joe Killian and Jon Doran, executive producers	AOL
2015 (67th)
2015 (67th)	A Tribute to Mel Brooks	Brian Katkin, Chuck Saftler, Adam Lewinson, Maureen Timpa and Raphael Kryszek, executive producers; Tava Smiley, host	FX
2015 (67th)	American Horror Story: Extra-Ordinary Artists	Ryan Murphy, Stephanie Gibbons, Sally Daws, Sue Keeton, Jason Miller and Ned Martel, producers	FX
2015 (67th)	Parks and Recreation: Behind the Final Season	Morgan Sackett, Dean Holland, Tom Ragazzo, Michael Maccarone and Greg Levine, producers	NBC.com
2015 (67th)	30 for 30 Shorts	Connor Schell, John Dahl and Bill Simmons, executive producers; Dan Silver, senior producer; Sean Stuart, produced by	ESPN
2015 (67th)	This Is Me	Joey Soloway, Andrea Sperling and Rebecca Odes, executive producers; Xan Aranda, co-executive producer/produced by; Rhys Ernst and Zackary Drucker, supervising producers	EW.com

Outstanding Short Form Nonfiction or Reality Series

Year	Program	Producers	Network
2016 (68th)
2016 (68th)	Inside Look: The People v. O. J. Simpson: American Crime Story	Ryan Murphy, Ned Martel, Stephanie Gibbons, Sally Daws, Sue Keeton and Kenna McCabe, producers	FX
2016 (68th)	Jay Leno's Garage	Jay Leno, executive producer; Kico Velarde, supervising producer; Helga Pollock, Trideev Dasgupta, Walker Dalton and David Swift, producers	NBC.com
2016 (68th)	National Endowment for the Arts: United States of Arts	Kimberly A. Austin and Rachel Klein, executive producers; Bradley Glenn, producer	arts.gov
2016 (68th)	Roots: A New Vision	Krista Liney, executive producer; Mariel Synan, producer	History
2016 (68th)	A Year in Space	Mike Beck, Jeffrey Kluger, Ian Orefice and Kira Pollack, executive producers; Jonathan D. Woods, producer	time.com
2017 (69th)
2017 (69th)	Viceland at the Women's March	Meghan Kirsch, executive producer; Nacho Gil, co-executive producer; Hannah Gregg, supervising producer; Michele Beno, producer	Viceland
2017 (69th)	Creating Saturday Night Live	Lorne Michaels, executive producer; Oz Rodriguez and Chris Voss, co-executive producers; Michael Scogin, supervising producer; Erik Kenward and Erin Doyle, producers	NBC
2017 (69th)	Feud: Bette and Joan: Inside Look	Ryan Murphy, Tanase Popa, Stephanie Gibbons, Kenna McCabe, Sally Daws and Maureen Timpa, producers	FX.com
2017 (69th)	Jay Leno's Garage	Jay Leno, executive producer; Kico Velarde, supervising producer; Helga Pollock, Trideev Dasgupta, Walker Dalton and David Swift, producers	NBC.com
2017 (69th)	National Endowment for the Arts: United States of Arts	Kimberly A. Austin and Rachel Klein, executive producers; Jeffrey Elmont and Bradley Glenn, producers	arts.gov
2018 (70th)
2018 (70th)	Anthony Bourdain: Explore Parts Unknown	Nathan Thornburgh, executive producer; Kate Kunath, executive producer; Joey Zadwarny, producer	CNN.com
2018 (70th)	The Americans: The Final Season	Stephanie Gibbons, Sally Daws, Kenna McCabe, Maureen Timpa, Joe Weisberg and Joel Fields, executive producers	FX
2018 (70th)	The Assassination of Gianni Versace: American Crime Story: America's Obsessions	Stephanie Gibbons, Sally Daws, Kenna McCabe, Maureen Timpa, Ryan Murphy and Tanase Popa, executive producers	FX
2018 (70th)	Jay Leno's Garage	Jay Leno, executive producer; Helga Pollock, Craig Velarde, David Swift, Walker Dalton and Steve Reich, producers	NBC.com
2018 (70th)	Top Chef: Last Chance Kitchen	Dan Cutforth, Jane Lipsitz and Doneen Arquines, executive producers; Hunter Braun, co-executive producer	BravoTV.com
2019 (71st)
2019 (71st)	Creating Saturday Night Live	Lorne Michaels, executive producer; Oz Rodriguez, Chris Voss and Matt Yonks, co-executive producers; Michael Scogin, supervising producer; Erin Doyle, producer	NBC
2019 (71st)	Fosse/Verdon (Inside Look)	Pastor Alvaro, Stephanie Gibbons, Sally Daws, Kenna McCabe and Maureen Timpa, executive producers; Iaian Smallwood, producer	FX
2019 (71st)	Pose: Identity, Family, Community (Inside Look)	Ryan Murphy, Tanase Popa, Stephanie Gibbons, Kenna McCabe, Sally Daws and Maureen Timpa, executive producers	FX
2019 (71st)	RuPaul's Drag Race: Out of the Closet	Tyler Hissey, Ray Hunt and Brittany Travis, executive producers; Joseph Gerbino, senior producer; Robert Diminico, producer	VH1
2019 (71st)	RuPaul's Drag Race: Portrait of a Queen	Tyler Hissey, Ray Hunt and Brittany Travis, executive producers; Joseph Gerbino, senior producer	VH1

=== 2020s ===
Year	Program	Producers	Network
2020 (72nd)
2020 (72nd)	National Geographic Presents Cosmos: Creating Possible Worlds	Erin Newsome and Sarah Lavoie, executive producers; Maricruz Merlo, supervising producer; Meghan Gleason, Matt Wizan and Tatiana Villegas, producers	National Geographic
2020 (72nd)	Between the Scenes — The Daily Show	Trevor Noah, executive producer/host; Jen Flanz, executive producer; Ramin Hedayati, supervising producer; Matt Negrin and Ryan Middleton, producers; Jocelyn Conn, produced by	Comedy Central
2020 (72nd)	Full Frontal with Samantha Bee Presents: Pandemic Video Diaries	Samantha Bee, executive producer; Allana Harkin, co-executive producer; Elisa Kreisinger, supervising producer; Anthony Zaccone and Caroline Dunphy, producers	TBS
2020 (72nd)	Pose: Identity, Family, Community	Stephanie Gibbons, Sally Daws, Kenna McCabe and Maureen Timpa, executive producers; Ryan Murphy and Tanase Popa, producers	FX
2020 (72nd)	RuPaul's Drag Race: Out of the Closet	Ray Hunt and Brittany Travis, executive producers; Joseph Gerbino, senior producer; Robert Diminico and Nalissa Cuthbert, producers	VH1
2021 (73rd)
2021 (73rd)	Uncomfortable Conversations with a Black Man	Emmanuel Acho, executive producer; Morolake Akinosun, producer	YouTube
2021 (73rd)	Full Frontal with Samantha Bee Presents: Pandemic Video Diaries: Vaxxed and Waxxed	Samantha Bee, host/executive producer; Allana Harkin, co-executive producer; Elisa Kreisinger, supervising producer; Caroline Dunphy and Anthony Zaccone, producers	TBS
2021 (73rd)	Inside Pixar	Jennifer Zaccaro, producer	Disney+
2021 (73rd)	Pose: Identity, Family, Community	Ryan Murphy, Tanase Popa, Stephanie Gibbons, Kenna McCabe, Sally Daws and Iaian Smallwood, executive producers	FX
2021 (73rd)	Top Chef: Last Chance Kitchen	Casey Kriley, Jo Sharon and Doneen Arquines, executive producers; Brendan Daw, Wade Sheeler and Hillary Olsen, co-executive producers	Bravo
2022 (74th)
2022 (74th)	Full Frontal with Samantha Bee Presents: Once Upon a Time in Late Night	Samantha Bee, executive producer/host; Allana Harkin, executive producer; Elisa Kreisinger, supervising producer; Caroline Dunphy and Anthony Zaccone, producers	TBS
2022 (74th)	Between the Scenes — The Daily Show	Trevor Noah, executive producer/host; Jen Flanz, executive producer; Ramin Hedayati and David Kibuuka, supervising producers; Folake Ayiloge, produced by; Jocelyn Conn, producer	Comedy Central
2022 (74th)	RuPaul's Drag Race: Whatcha Packin' with Michelle Visage	Ray Hunt, executive producer; Eric Dimitratos, co-executive producer; Joseph Gerbino, supervising producer; Robert Diminico, Christina D'ambrosio and Michelle Visage, producers	VH1
2022 (74th)	Saturday Night Live Presents: Stories from the Show	Lorne Michaels, executive producer; Paul Briganti and Grace Shaker, co-executive producers; Dina Moles, supervising producer; Sean McIlraith and Matt Yonks, producers	NBC
2022 (74th)	Top Chef: Last Chance Kitchen	Casey Kriley, Jo Sharon, Doneen Arquines and Wade Sheeler, executive producers; Hillary Olsen and Chris King, co-executive producers	Bravo
2023 (75th)
2023 (75th)	Succession: Controlling the Narrative	Chris Grasso and Melora Soodalter, executive producers; Jack Quinn, producer; Zachary Krame and Michael Hagos, supervising producers; Lindsay Nowak, senior producer	HBO
2023 (75th)	House of the Dragon: Inside the Episode	Anthony Mauro, executive producer; Cristina Catanzaro and Mia Hildebrand, co-executive producers; Dan Storey and Ashley Morton, supervising producers; Sarah Khan, senior producer	HBO
2023 (75th)	The Last of Us: Inside the Episode	Julio Cabral, Badger Denehy, Eddie Maldonado and Kathy Rocklein Sontag, executive producers; Chris Harnick, supervising producer; Lindsay Nowak, senior producer	HBO
2023 (75th)	Saturday Night Live Presents: Behind the Sketch	Lorne Michaels, executive producer; Grace Shaker and Dina Moles, supervising producers; Dan D'Lauro, Matt Yonks and Mike Diva, producers	NBC
2023 (75th)	The White Lotus: Unpacking the Episode	Shanna Yehlen and Jim Weiner, executive producers; Ximena Lopez and Katla McGlynn, co-executive producers; Sophia Trilling, senior producer	HBO
2024 (76th)
2024 (76th)	Shōgun – The Making of Shōgun	Stephanie Gibbons, Sally Daws and Kenna McCabe, executive producers; Melanie Pimentel, supervising producer; Joel Kazuo Knoernschild, senior producer; Andie Newell, producer	FX
2024 (76th)	After the Cut — The Daily Show	Jon Stewart and Jen Flanz, executive producers; Ramin Hedayati, co-executive producer; Jocelyn Conn, producer; Folake Ayiloge and Daniel Radosh, produced by	YouTube
2024 (76th)	The Crown: Farewell to a Royal Epic	Kelly Caton, supervising producer; Kia Milan, Melissa Mills, Alison Deknatel, Justin Alcantara and Alison Gross Kalmick, producers	Netflix
2024 (76th)	Hacks: Bit by Bit	John Wilhelmy, executive producer; Jordan Barker and Christy Castellano, co-executive producers; Pablo Herrero and Erin Denniston, supervising producers; Aliya Carter, produced by	Max
2024 (76th)	Saturday Night Live Presents: Behind the Sketch	Lorne Michaels, executive producer; Grace Shaker, Dina Moles, Matt Yonks and Daniel D'Lauro, producers	NBC
2025 (77th)
2025 (77th)	Adolescence: The Making of Adolescence	Kelly Caton, supervising producer; Jordan Anderson, Bram De Jonghe, Kia Milan, Nyle Washington and Simon Richards, producers	Netflix
2025 (77th)	Hacks: Bit by Bit	John Wilhelmy, executive producer; Jordan Barker and Christy Castellano, co-executive producers; Aliya Carter, produced by; Erin Denniston and Pablo Herrero, senior producers	HBO Max
2025 (77th)	Making of: The Last of Us	Badger Denehy, Eddie Maldonado, Sarah Mangum, Montres Henderson, Lindsay Nowak and Chris Harnick, executive producers	HBO
2025 (77th)	Only Murders in the Building: Unlocking the Mystery	Shannon Ryan, Aaron Goldman, Trisha Choate, Jillian Novak, Xavier Salas and Steve Pollard, executive producers	Hulu
2025 (77th)	The White Lotus: Unpacking the Episode	Natalia Echeverria and Jim Weiner, executive producers; Stephanie Piotrowski and Khalid West, producers; Sarah Khan and Maggie Glass, senior producers	HBO
2026 (78th)
2026 (78th)	Inside the Pitt	Jeremy Scripter, Jim Weiner, George Carty, Candice Song and Chris Harnick, executive producers; Aliya Carter, line producer	HBO Max
2026 (78th)	Hacks: Bit by Bit	Eric Butler, executive producer; Yuki Yoshiike and Kenan Hunter, co-executive producers; Aliya Carter, produced by; Erin Denniston and Pablo Herrero, senior producers	HBO Max
2026 (78th)	Love Story: John F. Kennedy Jr. & Carolyn Bessette – A Love Untold	Ryan Murphy, Tanase Popa, Stephanie Gibbons, Sally Daws and Kenna McCabe, executive producers; Melanie Pimentel, supervising producer	FX
2026 (78th)	Shrinking – In It Together	Bill Lawrence, Jeff Ingold, Liza Katzer, Jason Segel, Neil Goldman and Brett Goldstein, executive producers	Apple TV
2026 (78th)	This Is a Gardening Show	Frank Scherma and Jon Kamen, executive producers; Zach Galifianakis, executive producer/host; Chris Kim, producer; Christopher Raby, series producer	Netflix

== Programs with multiple nominations ==
7 nominations

- Jay Leno's Garage

5 nominations

- Top Chef: Last Chance Kitchen

3 nominations

- Hacks: Bit by Bit
- Pose: Identity, Family, Community

2 nominations

- Between the Scenes — The Daily Show
- Comedians in Cars Getting Coffee
- Creating Saturday Night Live
- Full Frontal with Samantha Bee Presents: Pandemic Video Diaries
- National Endowment for the Arts: United States of Arts
- RuPaul's Drag Race: Out of the Closet
- 30 for 30 Shorts
- The White Lotus: Unpacking the Episode
