= Full Frontal with Samantha Bee =

American late-night talk and news satire television program

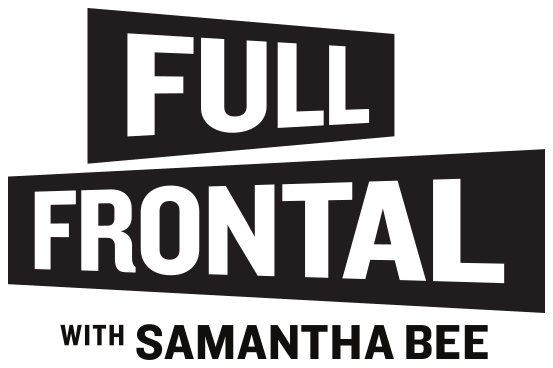
- Genre: News satire Talk show
- Created by: Samantha Bee
- Directed by: Paul Pennolino; Andre Allen
- Presented by: Samantha Bee
- Opening theme: "Boys Wanna Be Her" by Peaches
- Country of origin: United States
- Original language: English
- No. of seasons: 7
- No. of episodes: 218 (list of episodes)

Production
- Executive producers: Samantha Bee; Jason Jones; Tony Hernandez; Miles Kahn; Alison Camillo; Pat King
- Producers: Kim Burdges; Allana Harkin; Chris Savage; Melinda Taub
- Production locations: CBS Broadcast Center; New York City, New York (2016–2020); Norwalk, Connecticut (2021–2022)
- Editors: Jesse Coane; Anthony Mascorro; Tennille Uithof
- Running time: 21 minutes
- Production companies: Randy & Pam's Quality Entertainment; Jax Media; Studio T

Original release
- Network: TBS
- Release: February 8, 2016 – June 23, 2022

Full Frontal with Samantha Bee is an American late-night talk and news satire television program that aired on TBS from February 8, 2016 to June 23, 2022. The show was hosted by comedian Samantha Bee, the longest tenured former correspondent on The Daily Show. It was the winner of multiple accolades including a Television Critics Association Award, an Emmy, Academy of Television Arts & Sciences award and an GLAAD Media Award.

In July 2022, the show was cancelled following the Warner Bros. Discovery merger.

== Production ==
Samantha Bee served as a correspondent on The Daily Show for 12 years, becoming its longest tenured correspondent. She was not approached about succeeding Jon Stewart as the show's host when Stewart announced he would leave the show. Bee and her husband, Jason Jones, pitched television shows to networks, and their scripted series, called The Detour, was picked up by TBS in February 2015. TBS then decided to extend their relationship with Bee to develop a late-night talk show to pair with Conan.

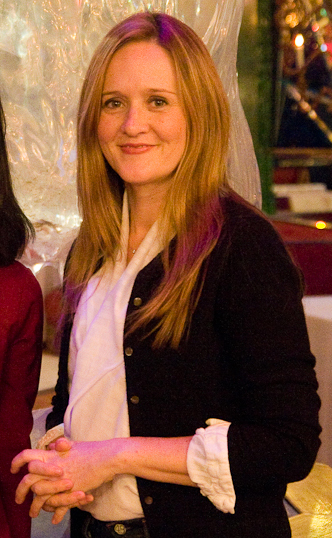
Bee in 2011

Bee hired Jo Miller and Miles Kahn, formerly producers on The Daily Show, as executive producers for her new show. They set up a blind process for hiring writers that hid the gender and experience level of the applicants, resulting in a writing staff that was approximately half female and 30% non-white. Kevin Fallon of The Daily Beast described the process as "revolutionary." The show also hired Winter Miller to help develop a mentorship program to help further diversify the writing room.

Before Full Frontal's format was finalized, Bee indicated that she would have segments that focus on news headlines, field pieces, and "grab bag" segments. She filmed a segment about how the Veterans Health Administration was not prepared to treat female soldiers, and filmed a segment in Jordan. Miller, who also worked as the showrunner, indicated that the series would be more interested in injustice than in hypocrisy. There were no interview guests on the series, but a number of guest actors have appeared in various segments. For example, the May 9, 2016, episode featured both the singer Michelle Branch and comedian Patton Oswalt.

Full Frontal shared a studio with Last Week Tonight with John Oliver. The dressing rooms were leftover from Bethenny Frankel's daytime talk show, and Bee told New York magazine. Bee's offices previously housed Stephen Colbert and his staff while renovations were taking place at the Ed Sullivan Theater for The Late Show with Stephen Colbert. At the time of its debut, Full Frontal was the only late-night talk show airing in the United States which was hosted by a woman.

On October 31, 2016, Full Frontal aired an interview Bee conducted with President Barack Obama.

In January 2017, Bee announced that the show would be hosting a gala to counter the White House Correspondents' Dinner. The event, titled "Not the White House Correspondents’ Dinner", was held at DAR Constitution Hall in Washington, D.C., on April 29, 2017, and aired the same evening at 10:00 p.m. EST on TBS, followed by an encore uncensored broadcast at 11:00 p.m. on Twitter. The event raised $200,000 for the Committee to Protect Journalists (CPJ).

A portion of the proceeds from the show's merchandise benefitted the Karam Foundation, Distributing Dignity, Planned Parenthood, the committee to Protect Journalists, and Hispanic Federation. In July 2017, Bee's "Nasty Woman Shirt" campaign raised over $1 million for Planned Parenthood. On August 9, 2017, Bee announced that thanks to Turner and Penguin Books, the show was able to send 10,000 books and coloring books to the Kurdish displaced person camp (Khazir) that they have visited. Full Frontal frequently supports other organizations and causes, including: 2017 Women's March, Girl Scouts of the USA, New Brunswick Today, miamirights.com, Life After Hate, Affordable Care Act (ACA), #MeToo, Time's Up, RAICES, and the National Association for the Advancement of Colored People (NAACP).

In January 2018, TBS renewed Full Frontal for a third and fourth season, set to air through 2020. In February 2018, a few weeks after the Harvey Weinstein scandal broke, the show featured the only late TV host, The Cut's Amanda Arnold wrote, "to immediately confront the disgraced media mogul’s accusations in a way that left viewers feeling satisfied." A March 2019 segment titled "#MeToon" was produced and animated by a crew of all women expounded upon sexual harassment allegations against Chris Savino and his successful union suspension process and featured interviews with a few of the female animators that were involved in his union suspension along with one of his alleged victims.

Due to the threat posed by the COVID-19 pandemic, on March 11, 2020, Bee announced on that night's episode of Full Frontal that future tapings would proceed without an in-studio audience. The COVID-19 affected episodes were subtitled Little Show in the Big Woods and were filmed in the woods, with Bee's husband Jason Jones acting as cameraman and her children running the lighting and cue cards. It was the first late-night show to tape without a studio audience. About the experience, Bee told The Daily Beast, "It felt important to me in terms of just keeping the lights on and keeping continuity of the show. It felt like giving us all a focus would be a good idea. And I stand by that; I think it has been good for us, to keep going, just one step in front of the other." When the show returned to studio taping, it began to originate instead from Norwalk, Connecticut; the Connecticut office of Film, Television and Digital Media was credited at the end of each episode.

=== Cast ===
Bee served as host and the show had four contributors who appear in field pieces: Michael Rubens (senior field producer), Allana Harkin (co-producer), Amy Hoggart, and Mike Brown. Harkin described the process to The Daily Beast: that they "rewrite right up until like 4:30, and we tape at 6." Contributors also included Ashley Nicole Black.

=== Writers ===
The show was written by Bee, Jo Miller, Reich (2016), Black (2016–19), Kristen Bartlett, Eric Drysdale (2016–17), Travon Free, Pat Cassels, Sean Crespo, Mike Drucker, Mathan Erhardt, Joe Grossman, Miles Kahn (also executive producer), Sahar Rizvi, Nicole Silverberg, and Melinda Taub. In December 2017 from episode 67, Taub was promoted to head writer of the show, and Barlett in 2020 from Season 5 Episode 1, while Silverberg was made writing supervisor.

Bee's deal with Turner ran through 2022. In July 2022, although show was "a signature program for the large cable network TBS," it was cancelled following the Warner Bros. Discovery merger. Brett Weitz, general manager of TBS, TNT and TruTV, strong supporter of Full Frontal left the company in May after the consolidation under Warner Bros. Discovery executive Kathleen Finch.

== Broadcast ==
In the United States, the first season of Full Frontal with Samantha Bee aired weekly on Mondays at 10:30 p.m. ET on TBS. On November 16, 2016, it was announced that TBS renewed the show for a second season, as well as moving it to Wednesdays at 10:30 p.m. EST, starting January 11, 2017. The original airing of the first episode was simulcast on TBS, Adult Swim, TNT, truTV, and HLN.

In Canada, the show aired on The Comedy Network. In Australia, Full Frontal was broadcast on SBS Viceland. In New Zealand, the show was broadcast on TVNZ Duke. In Germany, the show was broadcast on TNT Comedy with German subtitles.

== Episodes ==
Season	Episodes	Originally released	
Season	Episodes	First released	Last released
1	39	February 8, 2016	February 8, 2017
2	33	February 15, 2017	January 31, 2018
3	33	February 7, 2018	January 30, 2019
4	34	February 6, 2019	January 29, 2020
5	32	February 5, 2020	December 16, 2020
6	30	January 13, 2021	December 15, 2021
7	17	January 20, 2022	June 23, 2022

== Reception ==
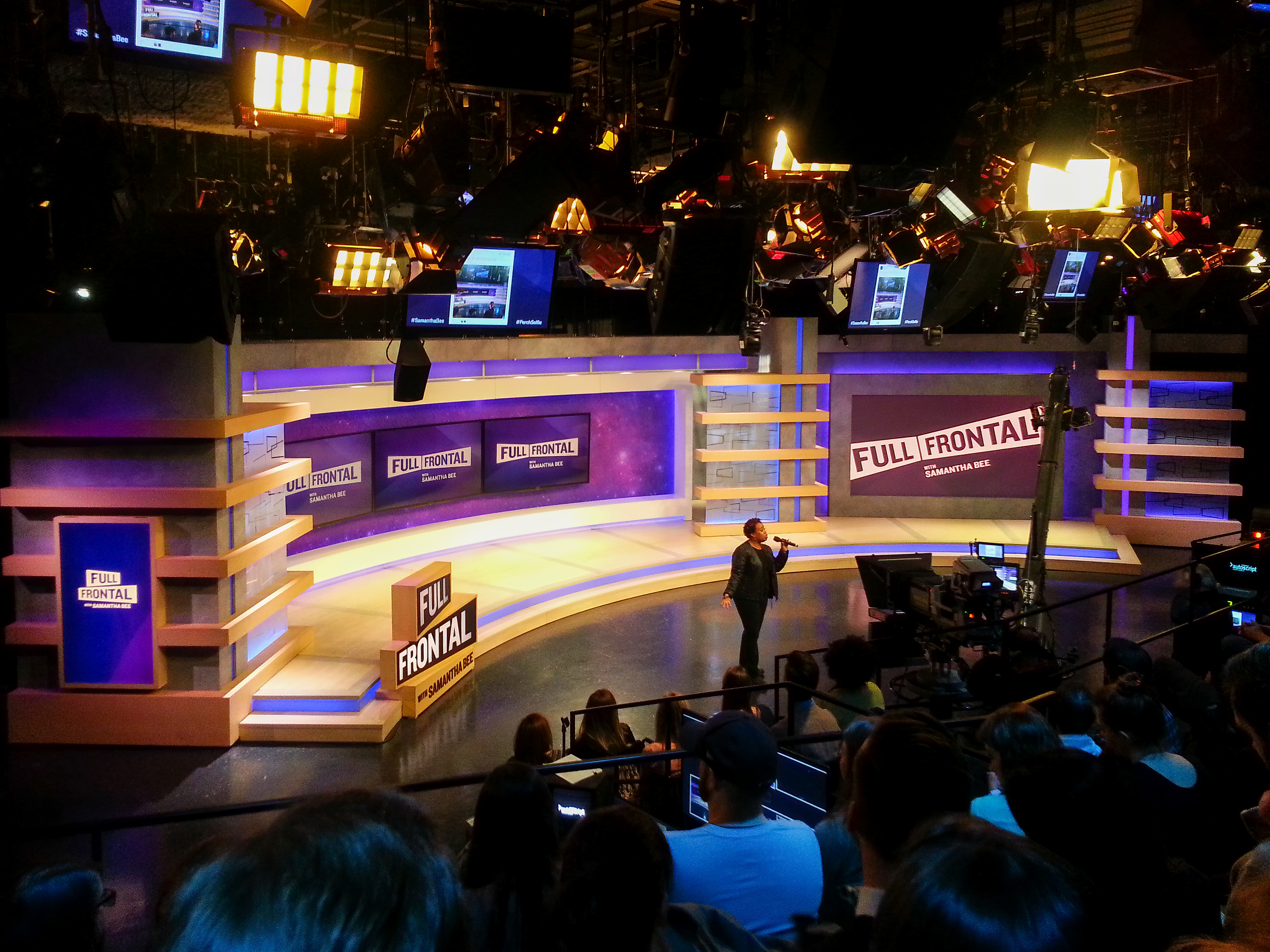
Full Frontal stage set before a February 2017 taping

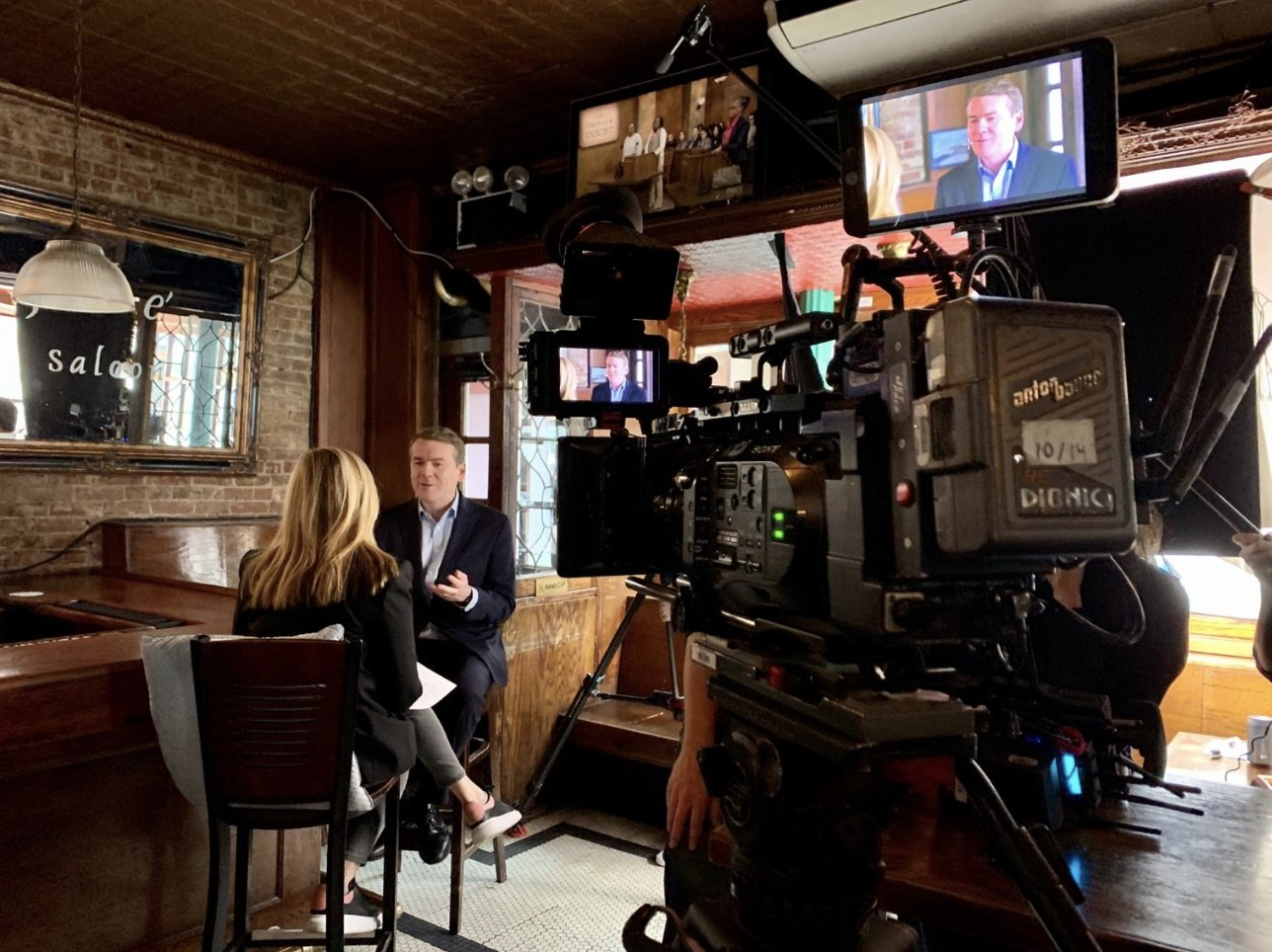
Bee interviewing U.S. Senator Michael Bennet in 2020

Full Frontal's first episode drew in 2.16 million viewers with subsequent episodes around the 2016 elections events drawing over 1 million. It was one of the most anticipated shows, with its teaser on YouTube drawing 1 million views.

The show was also met with critical acclaim, named one of the Best Shows of 2016 by the New York Times and won Outstanding Achievement in News and Information at the 32nd Television Critics Association Awards. On Rotten Tomatoes, the first season has an approval rating of 100% based on 25 reviews, with an average rating of 8.5/10. The site's critical consensus reads, "Full Frontal with Samantha Bee adds a female perspective to late-night TV – and one that's fresh and funny enough to deserve more than just one show a week." On Metacritic, the first season holds a score of 84 out of 100, based on 16 critics, which constitutes "universal acclaim".

TheWrap's Diane Gordon praised the show, saying "With Full Frontal, TBS truly has a comedy show that's sure to become part of the cultural conversation and possibly fill the void felt by Jon Stewart‘s departure. There's so much scathing, insightful, intelligent funny packed into Full Frontal and Bee's ability to land a joke is beyond impressive." Vulture called Full Frontal "a formidable force of political satire. It demands your attention," and the blog named Bee's "Trump Conspiracy Theory" segment as its #1 clip on its list of "The 10 Most Important Late-Night TV Moments in 2016." In March 2017, Wired's cultural critic Virginia Heffernan called Full Frontal "the most mercilessly feminist show (ever) (in history)".

The next year Full Frontal won Primetime Emmy Award for Outstanding Writing for a Variety Special for its "Not the White House Correspondents’ Dinner" special. In 2018 the show won a Television Academy Honor from the Academy of Television Arts & Sciences. The fourth season it won a GLAAD Media Award for the episode "Trans Rights Under Attack" written by Nicole Silverberg.

In June 2021, in its fifth season, New York magazine writer Jesse David Fox described it as "established" and "out of the barn."

=== Controversies ===
Full Frontal aired a segment on March 8, 2017, filmed at the Conservative Political Action Conference (CPAC), in which the narrator, correspondent Michael Rubens said Kyle Coddington, a writer for OUTSET magazine, had "Nazi hair". At the time, Coddington was undergoing chemotherapy for brain cancer. The show apologized the next day, saying they were unaware of his condition, and donated to his medical expenses on GoFundMe. Coddington stated he was unsatisfied with the apology.

On May 30, 2018, Bee ran a segment about the Trump administration's policy of separating children from families of undocumented immigrants at the border. Bee then criticized Ivanka Trump for hypocrisy after Trump tweeted a photo of herself and her child, saying, "Let me just say, one mother to another, do something about your dad's immigration practices, you feckless cunt!" The segment generated controversy. White House Press Secretary Sarah Huckabee Sanders called on both Turner and TBS to take action. Both Bee and TBS apologized. Both Autotrader.com and State Farm pulled their advertising from the show. Accepting a Television Academy Honors award later for Full Frontal’s #MeToo coverage, Bee said:

"Every week I strive to show the world as I see it, unfiltered. Sometimes I should probably have a filter. I accept that. Stories about 1,500 missing unaccompanied migrant children flooded the news cycle over the weekend. So last night we aired a segment on the atrocious treatment of migrant children by this administration and past administrations. Our piece attracted controversy of the worst kind... We spent the day wrestling with the repercussions of one bad word when we all should have spent the day incensed that as a nation we are wrenching children from their parents and treating people legally seeking asylum as criminals. If we are O.K. with that, then really, who are we?"

== Awards and nominations ==
Year	Award	Category	Result	Ref.
2016	32nd Television Critics Association Awards	Outstanding Achievement in News and Information	Won	
2016	32nd Television Critics Association Awards	Individual Achievement in Comedy	Nominated	
2016	68th Primetime Emmy Awards	Outstanding Writing for a Variety Series	Nominated	
2016	Dorian Awards	TV Current Affairs Show of the Year	Won	
2016	7th Critics' Choice Television Awards	Best Talk Show	Nominated	
2016	28th Producers Guild of America Awards	Outstanding Producer of Live Entertainment & Talk Television	Nominated	
2016	69th Directors Guild of America Awards	Variety/Talk/News/Sports – Regularly Scheduled	Nominated	
2016	69th Directors Guild of America Awards	Variety/Talk/News/Sports – Specials	Nominated	
2017	Gracie Awards	On-Air Talent - Entertainment or Sports	Won	
2017	MTV Movie & TV Awards	Best Host	Nominated	
2017	33rd Television Critics Association Awards	Outstanding Achievement in News and Information	Nominated	
2017	69th Primetime Emmy Awards	Outstanding Variety Talk Series	Nominated	
2017	69th Primetime Emmy Awards	Outstanding Writing for a Variety Series	Nominated	
2017	69th Primetime Emmy Awards	Outstanding Interactive Program	Nominated	
2017	69th Primetime Emmy Awards	Outstanding Variety Special	Nominated	
2017	69th Primetime Emmy Awards	Outstanding Writing for a Variety Special	Won	
2017	69th Primetime Emmy Awards	Outstanding Production Design for a Variety, Nonfiction, Event or Award Special	Nominated	
2017	69th Primetime Emmy Awards	Outstanding Directing for a Variety Special	Nominated	
2017	29th Producers Guild of America Awards	Outstanding Producer of Live Entertainment & Talk Television	Nominated	
2017	Dorian Awards	TV Current Affairs Show of the Year	Won	
2017	70th Directors Guild of America Awards	Variety/Talk/News/Sports – Regularly Scheduled Programming	Nominated	
2017	70th Directors Guild of America Awards	Variety/Talk/News/Sports – Specials	Nominated	
2017	71st Writers Guild of America Awards	Comedy/Variety – Talk Series	Nominated	
2018	Gracie Awards	Special	Won	
2018	Academy of Television Arts & Sciences	Television Academy Honor	Won	
2018	34th Television Critics Association Awards	Outstanding Achievement in Sketch/Variety Shows	Nominated	
2018	70th Primetime Emmy Awards	Outstanding Variety Talk Series	Nominated	
2018	70th Primetime Emmy Awards	Outstanding Writing for a Variety Series	Nominated	
2018	70th Primetime Emmy Awards	Outstanding Interactive Program	Nominated	
2018	70th Primetime Emmy Awards	Outstanding Directing for a Variety Series	Nominated	
2018	70th Primetime Emmy Awards	Outstanding Variety Special	Nominated	
2018	70th Primetime Emmy Awards	Outstanding Writing for a Variety Special	Nominated	
2018	70th Primetime Emmy Awards	Outstanding Picture Editing for Variety Programming	Nominated	
2018	Dorian Awards	TV Current Affairs Show of the Year	Won	
2018	72nd Writers Guild of America Awards	Comedy/Variety – Talk Series	Nominated	
2019	GLAAD Media Award	Outstanding Variety or Talk Show Episode (Note: For the episode:"Trans Rights Under Attack")	Won	
2019	35th Television Critics Association Awards	Outstanding Achievement in Sketch/Variety Shows	Nominated	
2019	71st Primetime Emmy Awards	Outstanding Variety Talk Series	Nominated	
2019	71st Primetime Emmy Awards	Outstanding Writing for a Variety Series	Nominated	
2020	10th Critics' Choice Television Awards	Best Talk Show	Nominated	
2020	36th Television Critics Association Awards	Outstanding Achievement in Sketch/Variety Shows	Nominated	
2020	72nd Primetime Emmy Awards	Outstanding Variety Talk Series	Nominated	
2020	72nd Primetime Emmy Awards	Outstanding Writing for a Variety Series	Nominated	
2020	72nd Primetime Creative Arts Emmy Awards	Outstanding Short Form Nonfiction or Reality Series	Nominated	
2021	11th Critics' Choice Television Awards	Best Talk Show	Nominated	
