= Davor Džalto =

Orthodox thinker and writer

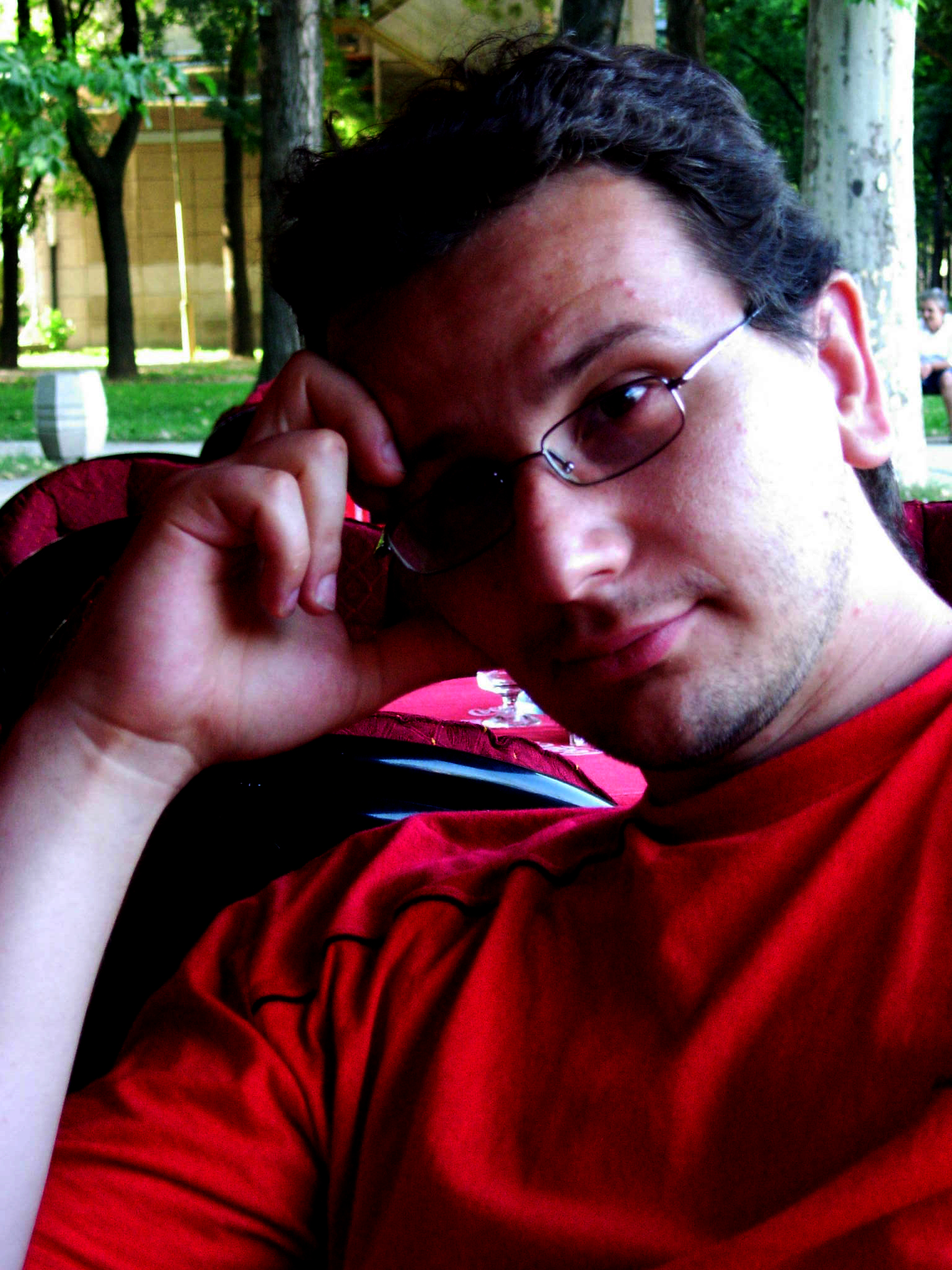
- Džalto in 2005
- Born: 17 May 1980 (age 46); Travnik, SR Bosnia and Herzegovina, Yugoslavia

Education
- Education: University of Belgrade (M.A.); University of Freiburg (Ph.D.)
- Doctoral advisor: Angeli Janhsen

Philosophical work
- School: Postmodern theology; Personalism; Christian anarchism
- Main interests: Eastern Orthodox theology; Iconology; Art history; Aesthetics; Political philosophy
- Notable ideas: Contemporary art as icons; Self-referential art as self-determination; Aesthetics of ekstasis; Anarchism as Orthodox political philosophy

Davor Džalto (Serbian Cyrillic: Давор Џалто; born 17 May 1980) is an artist, art historian, theologian and philosopher of Bosnian-Herzegovinian origin.

== Biography ==
Džalto was born in Travnik, Bosnia and Herzegovina. He graduated from the School of Art in Niš, Serbia. As an 18-year-old student he published his first book – On Writing as an Artistic, Historical, Social and Cultural Phenomenon.

His academic career started in Belgrade where he received an MA in art history from the University of Belgrade Faculty of Philosophy. He graduated with a thesis in art history, as the best student of the Faculty.

Since 2007, he has been a university professor of history and theory of art and of Orthodox Christian theology and religious studies. He has taught at various universities in Europe and the United States, including University of Prague, Indiana University, Fordham University in New York, and the University of Stockholm.

== Work ==
His academic work focuses on the exploration of human freedom and creativity, as metaphysical, political, and aesthetic concepts.

He has been publishing in the fields of political philosophy, cultural studies, history and theory of art and theology, in English, Serbo-Croatian and German.

He was a founding member and the art director of the Flexible Art Network, which explored relations between artworks, artists and the public; the president of the Institute for the Study of Culture and Christianity; and the vice president of the Christian Cultural Center, coordinating activities with Fr. Radovan Bigovic to promote inter-religious and ecumenical dialogue.

He has been a commentator and contributor to regional and international liberal and left-wing media on politics and religion as well as civic and academic freedoms and culture.

He works in the media of painting, printmaking, installations and interventions in space and performances. His artworks have been presented at numerous exhibitions.

== Impact ==
In the media and in the academic community he has been described as “the most important Orthodox thinker today”, "one of the most important thinkers today in the Orthodox world," "one of the most important Orthodox thinkers in the world today," and “one of the most important contemporary philosophers.”

He contributed to the theory of creativity by exploring human creative capacities (most notably on the example of art) as an expression of the personal identity of the human being, having an existential importance. He was the first one to formulate a theological argument (from an Orthodox Christian perspective) based on his analysis of modern and contemporary art (in particular the work of Marcel Duchamp, Richard Long, Joseph Kosuth and Andy Warhol). That way he contributed to the revision of the postmodernism, actualizing the question of the possibility and meaning of (human) ontological freedom and creation. This approach was especially developed in his book Beyond Capitalist Dystopia, where he claimed that a new freedom-affirming metaphysics is needed, as a basis for a new conceptualization of non-oppressive political ideologies.

He continued to further develop theological concepts of John Zizioulas and philosophical statements given by Nikolai Berdyaev, implementing them in the analysis of contemporary society. He also examines the concept of "simulacrum" in relation to the human person and its ability to create. Based on the Aesthetik der Absenz, formulated in German-speaking art circles, he recognized and explained the phenomenon of "absence of body" in twentieth-century art.

He contributed to Christian and, specifically, Orthodox Christian political theology with his understanding of anarchism as a political philosophy which focuses on the affirmation of human freedom against any institution or exercise of power. This shapes his approach to "Orthodox Christian anarchism," which he proposes as the only political philosophy which is consistent with Orthodox Christian anthropology and ontology. His approach to political theology is best exemplified in his book Anarchy and the Kingdom of God: From Eschatology to Orthodox Political Theology and Back, which has been described as "perhaps the best book on Christian anarchism since Jacques Ellul" and "a rich contribution to the burgeoning literature on political theology, and a particularly welcome perspective in the field of Orthodox political theology."

He was involved in ecumenical and peace-building initiatives during his affiliation with the Pax Christi office in Belgrade and as part of the Christian Cultural Center. He has participated in a number of regional and international conferences and peace building initiatives that contributed to the promotion of peace, reconciliation, and ecumenical dialogue.

In 2007, his name appeared on a list of 100 most influential people of Serbian origin in the world, compiled by the daily Blic.

== Criticism ==
Džalto’s positions on contemporary and recent political questions in the Balkans have been criticized in the media and in popular literature. Jasmin Agic writing for Al-Jazeera, characterized him as providing “ideological guidance” to Noam Chomsky, for Chomsky’s position on a variety of political questions related to the Balkans, criticizing him for minimizing the negative role of the Serbs in the war conflicts of the 1990s.

He has also been under attack by some conservative intellectuals and the media for his work on contributing to gender equality in the Balkans, dismissed as the attempt to "change the consciousness of the entire population of Serbia."

== Artwork ==
- Verbal and Visual Marking of Space – Performance-installation (2000)
- Funeral of an Author – Video-performance (2002)
- Creating... – Video (2003)
- The Red Army – Video (2003)
- Icons in Black Forest – Action (2004)
- Meditation with Icons and Serbian Coffee in Japanese Garden (in Freiburg) – Performance (2005)
- Absent Body of the Artist – Actions (2006)
- The Body of the Artist – Photographs (2006)
- One and Three Pyramids – Installation, Belgrade (2007)
- 10/30 – Retrospective art exhibition, Belgrade (2010)
- Facing New Faces of Icons – One-man exhibition, Greifswald (2011)

== Selected articles ==
- Who is an Author (Artist)? (2003)
- Totalitarianism and Totalitarianisms on Serbian Way to European Union (2004)
- Significance and Meaning of the Process of Global Integrations (2004)
- On the Meaning of Church Art (2004)
- Human Face between Mask and Person (2005)
- On the Horrible Sin of Nationalism (2006)
- A Comparative Research of the Space Issue on the Examples of the "Lamentation" Composition from Nerezi and Giotto's "Lamentation" from the Arena Chapel (2006)
- Techne vs. Creatio: The Inner Conflict of Art (2010)
- The (In)Stability of Memory (2012)
- Beauty Will Destroy the World (2012)
- Religion, Politics, and Beyond: The Pussy Riot Case (2013)
- Ikonen neu:gefasst oder über das Menschsein in unserer heutigen Medienkultur (2014)
- Art: A Brief History of Absence (From the Conception and Birth, Life and Death, to the Living Deadness of Art) (2015)
- Otherness, Symbolism, and Modernism in Serbia: Leon Koen (2015)
- The Quest for Reality That Has Not Happened (Yet) (2016)
- Monism, Dualism, Pluralism? From Orthodox Cosmology to Political Theology (2016)
- Icons – Between Images and Words. Between Images and Words. Modes of Representation or Modes of Being? (2016)
- The Challenge of ‘Posteriority’ and Pluralism (2016)
- Orthodox Christian Political Theology: An Anarchist Perspective” in Political Theologies in Orthodox Christianity (2017)
- Christianity and Contemporary Art: An (Un)Natural Alliance? (2017)
- Icons: the Orthodox Understanding of Images and the Influence on Western Art (2019)
- The Aesthetic Face of the Sacred (2019)
- Orthodoxes Christentum und zeitgenössische Kunst (2019)
- Freedom and Nothingness, between Theodicy and Anthropodicy: Lacan and (Un)Orthodox Perspectives (2019)

== Books ==
- On Writings as an Artistic, Historic, Cultural and Social Phenomenon, Niš: Đorđe Krstić School of Art (1998)
- The Role of the Artist in Self-Referent Art, Berlin: Dissertation.de (2007)
- The Testimony of Icons (Svedočanstvo ikona /in Serbian/, Ikonen legen Zeugnis ab /in German/), Belgrade – Tainach: Christian Cultural Center, Sodalitas (2008)
- Decem concepti et termini, Belgrade: Faculty of Culture and Media (2009)
- Plus Ultra: Essays in Culture, Communication and Faith, Belgrade: Otacnik (2011)
- Res Publica, Belgrade-Požarevac: Diocese of Braničevo-Department of Education and Culture (2013)
- The Human Work of Art: A Theological Appraisal of Creativity and the Death of the Artist, New York: SVS Press (2014)
- Religion and Realism, New Castle u. Tyne: Cambridge Scholars (2016)
- Art as Tautology, Belgrade: Clio (2016)
- In Medias Res, Belgrade: Admiral Books (2017)
- Yugoslavia: Peace, War, and Dissolution (with Noam Chomsky), New York: PMP (2018)
- Religion and Art: Rethinking Aesthetic and Auratic Experiences in 'Post-Secular' Times (2019)
- Savremena čitanja Velikog Inkvizitora (Contemporary Readings of the Grand Inquisitor), Belgrade: Vulkan (2020)
- Anarchy and the Kingdom of God: From Eschatology to Orthodox Political Theology and Back New York: Fordham University Press (2021)
- Orthodoxy and Fundamentalism: Contemporary Perspectives (with George Demacopoulos), Lanham: Rowman & Littlefield (Lexington Books/Fortress Academic) (2022)
- Beyond Capitalist Dystopia: Rethinking Freedom and Democracy in the Age of Global Crises, London: Routledge (2022)
- Schöpfung und Nichts: Orthodoxe Theologie und moderne Kunst im Dialog, Sankt Ottilien: EOS Verlag (2023)
- Savremena čitanja Apokalipse, Belgrade: Agape Books (2023)
- (Post) istina (post) demokratije, Belgrade: Mediasfera (2024)
- Orthodoxy and Anarchism: Contemporary Perspectives, Lanham: Rowman & Littlefield (Lexington Books/Fortress Academic) (2024)
- Politics of (Un)Freedom: Freedom and Democracy in the Age of Instrumental Reason and Information Capitalism, Eugene, OR: Wipf and Stock/Cascade Books (2026)
