= Not the White House Correspondents' Dinner =

2017 television event hosted by Samantha Bee

- Created by: Samantha Bee
- Directed by: Paul Pennolino
- Presented by: Samantha Bee
- Country of origin: United States

Production
- Executive producers: Samantha Bee; Jason Jones; Tony Hernandez; Miles Khan
- Producers: Kristen Everman; Alison Camillo
- Production locations: DAR Constitution Hall, Washington, D.C., US
- Camera setup: Multi camera
- Running time: 52 minutes
- Production companies: Jax Media; Studio T

Original release
- Network: TBS
- Release: 29 April 2017

Not the White House Correspondents' Dinner was an event put on by Full Frontal with Samantha Bee to rival the traditional White House Correspondents' Dinner in 2017. The event was announced on January 30, 2017, and took place at the DAR Constitution Hall on April 29, 2017, at the same time as the planned WHCA event. It aired on TBS the same evening at 10:00 p.m. EST, followed by an encore uncensored broadcast at 11:00 p.m. on Twitter.

The event, hosted by Samantha Bee, featured pre-recorded appearances by Allison Janney (reprising her West Wing role as C.J. Cregg), Jake Tapper, Billy Eichner, Robin Thede, Norman Lear, Bridget Everett, Patton Oswalt, River Butcher, Cameron Esposito, Kumail Nanjiani, Carl Reiner, Janelle Reeves, Paula Pell, Jordan Carlos, and Retta. Also appearing live were Peaches performing the theme song from Full Frontal, "Boys Wanna Be Her", and special guest Will Ferrell reprising his imitation of George W. Bush.

The event raised $200,000 for the Committee to Protect Journalists (CPJ).

== Segments ==
- Cold Open: Opens with a parody of a White House style news conference with Allison Janney reprising her role as C. J. Cregg.
- Peaches and Monologue: A musical intro by Peaches – performing Full Frontal's theme song "Boys Wanna Be Her", followed by a monologue by Bee.
- Roast of Jeff Zucker: A roast of CNN and its then-president Jeff Zucker.
- What Is Facts: A sketch facetiously mixing quantum mechanics with "alternative facts".
- Comedians Roast Trump.
- Fox News In Memoriam: Bee roasts Fox News while calling out Roger Ailes and Bill O'Reilly.
- Jake Tapper: Bee is "interviewed" by Jake Tapper.
- Special Guest George W. Bush: Will Ferrell reprises his Saturday Night Live role as former president George W. Bush.
- Woman in the High Castle: Bee watches a film of herself in an alternate universe, where she is roasting President Hillary Clinton (The Man in the High Castle parody).
- Sammy Bee Roasts the Presidents: Bee roasts presidents; from Woodrow Wilson to Bill Clinton with period-appropriate attire and speech.
- Show Close and Committee to Protect Journalists: Bee announces how much money was raised for the Committee to Protect Journalists, and speaks on the subject of journalistic freedom.
- All The President's Leaks (with Andy Richter) (web extra).

== Awards and nominations ==
| Year | Award | Category | Nominee(s) | Result | Ref. |
|---|---|---|---|---|---|
| 2017 | 69th Primetime Emmy Awards | Outstanding Variety Special | Samantha Bee, executive producer/host; Jo Miller, Jason Jones, Tony Hernandez, and Miles Kahn, executive producers; Alison Camillo, co-executive producer; Pat King, supervising producer; Kristen Everman, produced by | Nominated | |
| 2017 | 69th Primetime Emmy Awards | Outstanding Writing for a Variety Special | Samantha Bee, Jo Miller, Ashley Nicole Black, Pat Cassels, Eric Drysdale, Mathan Erhardt, Travon Free, Joe Grossman, Miles Kahn and Melinda Taub | Won | |
| 2017 | 69th Primetime Emmy Awards | Outstanding Production Design for a Variety, Nonfiction, Event or Award Special | John Yeck | Nominated | |
| 2017 | 69th Primetime Emmy Awards | Outstanding Directing for a Variety Special | Paul Pennolino | Nominated | |
| 2017 | 70th Directors Guild of America Awards | Variety/Talk/News/Sports – Specials | Paul Pennolino | Nominated | |
| 2018 | Gracie Awards | Special | Full Frontal with Samantha Bee | Won | |

== See also ==
- List of dining events
- List of Full Frontal with Samantha Bee episodes
- Rally to Restore Sanity and/or Fear
- Stephen Colbert at the 2006 White House Correspondents' Dinner
