= Karam Foundation =

- Formation: 2007; 19 years ago
- Founder: Lina Sergie Attar
- Founded at: Chicago
- Legal status: Active
- Website: www.karamfoundation.org

The Karam Foundation is an aid organization which started in 2007 and focuses on helping those affected by the Syrian Civil War.

== History ==
The Karam Foundation began as a food drive in the south side of Chicago, but after the Syrian Civil War started, they began focusing on helping Syrians. They currently work across Syria, Turkey, Lebanon, and Jordan with refugee families from the conflict. Projects have included starting schools, sponsoring refugee families, supporting small refugee owned businesses, supplying families within Syria with food and other necessities, and more.

Karam is Arabic for generosity.

== Support and media attention ==
In 2017 Samantha Bee raised money for Karam on her show Full Frontal with Samantha Bee. Karam has also been featured in Forbes, CBS, and The Chicago Tribune. In 2019 the Karam Foundation was featured in an episode of Orange Is the New Black.
