= Winter Miller =

American journalist (born 1973)

- Born: 1973 (age 52–53)
- Education: Smith College; Columbia University (MFA)
- Occupations: playwright, journalist
- Writing career
- Period: late 20th/early 21st century
- Subjects: gender identity, genocide

Winter Miller (born 1973) is an American playwright and journalist. In the summer of 2007, a reading (directed by Joanna Settle) of Miller's play In Darfur was at the Delacorte Theater in New York City.

Miller was formerly the assistant to Nicholas D. Kristof, a columnist of The New York Times, and is now a reporter on the Times 's Metropolitan news desk. She has also written for the weekly Arts and Leisure, Style, daily Culture and Obituary pages of the Times.

== In Darfur ==
In Darfur was developed by The Guthrie Theater, The Public Theater, Geva Theater, and The Playwrights' Center. The play was based on interviews conducted by Miller and Kristof at the Sudan border with genocide survivors.

== Personal ==
Miller is a 1995 graduate of Smith College and has an M.F.A. from Columbia University.

== Partial bibliography ==
=== Plays ===
- In Darfur (2006)
- The Penetration Play (2004)
- Conspicuous
- Something's Wrong With Amandine
- Cake and Ice Cream
- No One is Forgotten

=== Journalism ===
- "The Rev. Calvin O. Pressley, 69; Urged Clergy to Reach Out." The New York Times, 27 September 2007.
- "Just Another Medieval Quartet Crossing Over." The New York Times, 13 September 2006.
- "A NIGHT OUT WITH: 'Saturday Night Live' Cast Members; The New Wild and Crazy Guys." The New York Times, 5 February 2006.
- "A NIGHT OUT WITH: Samantha Bee; Joking for Two." The New York Times, 13 November 2005.
- "THEATER: Hey, Look Them Over: The Digital Head Shot Is Here." The New York Times, 23 October 2005.
- "THEATER: Beyond Cute Boys in Their Underpants." The New York Times, 7 August 2005.
