= Elisa Kreisinger =

- Born: Elisa Kreisinger; 1986 (age 39–40); New Jersey U.S.
- Other name: Pop Culture Pirate
- Education: Simmons College
- Occupation: New Media Artist
- Years active: 2007-present
- Website: PopCulturePirate.com

Elisa Kreisinger (born 1986), known as Pop Culture Pirate, is a Brooklyn-based video artist and educator.

== Early life ==
Kreisinger was born in New Jersey. In 2008, she received a B.A. in Communications & Women's Studies from Simmons College in Boston.

== Career ==
=== New media art ===
Kreisinger started to explore the idea of feminist remix of media as an undergraduate at Simmons College, with a focus on remixing the feminist narrative as it relates to identity. She interned at Cambridge Community TV, where she had access to equipment and video training.

Kreisinger's videos remix Mad Men into feminists and The Real Housewives into lesbians. Her Mad Men trailers on Vimeo have had more viewership than the original series' YouTube trailers.

Kreisinger's work explores feminist and queer-friendly perspectives through remix and mashup of mainstream media texts. The Queer Carrie Project recuts entire seasons of Sex and the City into short, 1-3 minute webisodes that portray its characters as lesbians. Most of Kreisinger's work uses the language and style of existing TV shows or Hollywood editing as a way to, as she describes it, "talk back" to pop culture.

Kreisinger's work has been featured in online publications such as Salon and California Western School of Law's New Media Rights.

=== Digital ===
From 2012 to 2014, Kreisinger worked at Eileen Fisher in Communications. From December 2014 to July 2015, Kreisinger was Creative Director at Upworthy.

Since July 2015, Kreisinger is an Executive Producer at Refinery29.

She is a former moderator at Political Remix.

== Copyright and fair use ==
Kreisinger's work engages with concepts of copyright laws and fair use. Despite operating on legal terms of fair use for parodic, educational and transformative purposes, Kreisinger's work is often erroneously flagged for copyright violation on video sharing sites such as YouTube.

Kreisinger is a vocal advocate for fair use, digital literacy and critical uses of pop culture and gender representation within mainstream media. She has presented at industry and academic conferences such as Open Video Conference, Mobility Shifts Conference, among others.

In 2012, Kreisinger testified at the US Copyright Office, which helped to win crucial exemptions to the Digital Millennium Copyright Act.

There was a US Copyright Office White paper that focused on appropriation art online as a result of the exhibit, Fair Use(r).

== Exhibitions ==
Solo exhibitions

- 2014: FRAMED! The Attack on Fair Use and Digital Artists on the Internet, Kianga Ellis Projects

Group exhibitions

- 2012: South by Southwest (Austin)
- 2014: Fair Use(r), Eyebeam (New York)
- 2014: Fair Use(r), Kianga Ellis Projects (New York)
- 2014: Fowler Project Space
- Museum of Film and Television Berlin (Berlin)
- MIP Cube (France)

== Honors ==
- 2013: Eyebeam, Project Resident
- 2013: NYU School of Engineering, Women in Technology Fellow

== Works and publications ==
Works

- 2009: QueerCarrie: Season 1 – footage: Sex and the City
- 2009: QueerCarrie: Season 2 – footage: Sex and the City
- 2010: QueerCarrie: Seasons 3-6 – footage: Sex and the City
- 2011: Adrienne Maloof, Peacemaker/ Feminist: Real Housewives of Beverly Hills – footage: Real Housewives of Beverly Hills
- 2012: Mad Men: Set Me Free – footage: Mad Men, audio: The Supremes, "You Keep Me Hangin' On"
- 2012: QueerMen: Don Loves Roger – footage: Mad Men
- 2013: Picasso Baby I'm Feeling 22 – footage: Jay Z, "Picasso Baby" video, audio: Taylor Swift, "22"

Publications

- Pozner, Jennifer L. (2010). Reality Bites Back: The Troubling Truth About Guilty Pleasure TV. Berkeley, CA: Seal Press. pp. 315–316, 340–341. ISBN 978-1-580-05375-4. OCLC 748093089.
- Kreisinger, Elisa (2012). Coppa, Francesca; Levin Russo, Julie (eds.). "Fan/Remix Video: Queer video remix and LGBTQ online communities". Transformative Works and Cultures (9). doi:10.3983/twc.2012.0395.
