= Allana Harkin =

Canadian comedian, actress, and playwright

- Born: Hamilton, Ontario, Canada
- Education: St. Thomas More Catholic Secondary School; University of Western Ontario; York University (masters in theatre)
- Notable work: Full Frontal with Samantha Bee, the Atomic Fireballs
- Spouse: Michael
- Children: 2

Comedy career
- Years active: 2001–present
- Medium: Television, theatre, film

Allana Harkin (born in Hamilton, Ontario, Canada) is a Canadian comedian, actress, and playwright.

Harkin wrote the comedy play Real Estate, which premiered at Theatre Collingwood and later became very successful at Theatre Aquarius. She is also a former member of all-female comedy troupe the Atomic Fireballs. It was through this troupe that Harkin first met Samantha Bee, the group's co-founder. Bee and Harkin later collaborated on the parenting blog "Eating Over the Sink" for the website Babble.com, and have since been described as "best friends".

When Bee later became the host of Full Frontal with Samantha Bee, she called Harkin immediately to ask her to work on the show's staff. Harkin was the producer of, and a correspondent on, this show. Harkin occasionally acts in films, having appeared in both The Birder (2014) and Patch Town (2015).
