= A. R. Bernard =

American Christian clergyman (born 1953)

- Born: Alfonso R. Bernard; August 10, 1953 (age 73); Panama
- Occupations: Evangelist pastor, businessman, banker
- Political party: Republican
- Spouse(s): Karen, 1972-present
- Children: 7
- Parent: Adelina Fleming

Ecclesiastical career
- Religion: Pentecostal Christianity

Alfonso Rogelio Bernard Sr. (born August 10, 1953) is the founder, CEO and pastor of the Christian Cultural Center megachurch in Brooklyn, New York. In the 2020s, the CCC is a 37,000+ member church that sits on an 11 1/2-acre campus in Brooklyn, New York.

== Early life and education ==
Bernard was born in Panama, the son of an Afro-Panamanian mother and a Castilian Spaniard father. His father disowned him and in 1957, he and his mother moved to the Bedford-Stuyvesant neighborhood of Brooklyn, New York. His family was Catholic and attended Mass, but he eventually got involved with local Protestant churches. As a young man, Bernard was a part of the Black Muslim movement. He became a born-again Christian in January 1975.

As part of the 1960s desegregation movement in the public school system, he was bused to school in Ridgewood, Queens and then attended Grover Cleveland High School. Bernard worked after school in the garment district pushing racks for $2.00 per hour to assist his mother in their single parent household. He landed a clerk position with Bankers Trust Company during his senior year of high school.

Bernard gained a Master of Urban Studies and a Master of Divinity from Alliance Theological Seminary. He has been awarded an honorary Doctor of Divinity degree from Wagner College and an honorary Doctor of Divinity degree from Nyack College/Alliance Theological Seminary.

== Career ==
In 1978 he and his wife Karen started a Bible study in the kitchen of their Brooklyn railroad apartment. Bernard left his 10-year banking career in 1979 to go into ministry full-time, and they rented a small storefront in Greenpoint, Brooklyn. Later that year Household of Faith Ministries was incorporated. In 1988, Household of Faith turned an abandoned Brooklyn supermarket into a 1000-seat sanctuary, naming it Christian Life Center in June 1989, with a membership of 625. In 1995 they purchased a vacant lot adjacent to Starrett City and the church moved into its new home on December 31, 2000.

Bernard has served as the President of the Council of Churches of the City of New York, as well as the Boards of Directors for the Commission of Religious Leaders (CORL), the Brooklyn Public Library and the New York City Economic Development Corporation.

Bernard has founded the New School of Biblical Theology in Orlando Florida and the Brooklyn Preparatory School in New York City.

During the campaigning for the 2016 presidential elections, Bernard joined the board of Donald Trump's "Evangelical Executive Advisory Board". The purpose of the board was to "provide advisory support to Mr. Trump on those issues important to Evangelicals and other people of the faith in America,” the campaign said in a statement. Bernard then stepped down in 2017 quoting a "deepening conflict in values between myself and the administration."

In 2018, Bernard put forward a plan to build an urban village within the CCC complex. The site was designed to include over 2,000 apartments, a grocery store, greenspace, a trade school, a performing arts center and daycare center. Half of the apartments would be reserved for people on low incomes.

== Personal life ==
Bernard has been married to Karen since 1972. They met in high school when he 15 and she 16. In an interview, he revealed that they were once headed for divorce because of some decisions that he had made and that he had made his "ministry his mistress". They have 7 sons and several grandchildren together.

His eldest son, Alfonso R. Bernard Jr., died from an asthma attack on 4 February 2015 at the age of 39 and is survived by his wife Janel and four children.

== Recognition ==
- In 2018, he was recognised as one of New York’s 50 Most Powerful People in Brooklyn by City & State
- In 2016 the New York Times recognised him as The Power Pastor
- In 2007 he was given a Lifetime Achievement Award by the Consulate General of Israel in New York

== Published works ==
- Happiness Is (Touchstone, 2011)
- Chasing Donkeys: Finding God's Purpose at the Crossroads of Everyday Life (2013)
- Four Things Women Want from a Man (Howard Books, 2017)
