= Ashley Nicole Black =

American comedian, actress and writer

- Born: June 15, 1985 (age 40); Los Angeles, California, U.S.
- Education: University of California, Santa Cruz (BA); Northwestern University (MA)
- Occupations: Comedian; actress; writer
- Years active: 2014–present
- Known for: Full Frontal with Samantha Bee

Ashley Nicole Black (born June 15, 1985) is an American comedian, actress, writer and producer. She was a writer and correspondent for Full Frontal with Samantha Bee (2016–2019), for which she received a Primetime Emmy Award for Outstanding Writing for a Variety Special.

Black was a writer for Ted Lasso, The Amber Ruffin Show, and A Black Lady Sketch Show, on which she also starred.

== Early life and education ==
Black was born in Los Angeles, and grew up in the nearby suburb of Walnut, California.

She graduated from the University of California, Santa Cruz, in 2007 with a degree in theatre arts. She then attended Northwestern University, where she earned a master's degree in performance studies. Black was four years into a PhD program at Northwestern University when she decided to drop out and pursue her dream of working in comedy.

== Career ==
Black's comedy career began at the Second City, where she first attended an improv class.

In 2016, she was hired as a correspondent on Full Frontal with Samantha Bee. She worked on the show for three years, during which time she received six total Primetime Emmy Award nominations, winning in 2017 for Outstanding Writing for a Variety Special. Her last episode on Full Frontal was on February 13, 2019.

Black has also appeared as an actor on Comedy Central's Drunk History and in the 2014 film An American Education.

In 2019, Black joined other WGA writers in firing their agents as part of the WGA's stand against the ATA and the practice of packaging.

She is a cast member and writer on HBO's A Black Lady Sketch Show, which debuted in 2019. Black joined Ted Lasso as staff writer and producer for the show's second season and she joined the writing staff of The Amber Ruffin Show in 2021.

In December 2021, she signed an overall deal with Warner Bros. Television Studios to create and produce programming for HBO Max and other streaming services and cable and broadcast outlets.

She took over as the voice of Ms. Jacobson in the 12th season of Bob's Burgers replacing Melissa Bardin Galsky. Starting in season 13, she also took over the role of Harley, replacing Katie Crown.

== Personal life ==
Black resides in Los Angeles, California.

== Awards and nominations ==
- Black won an Emmy for Outstanding Writing For A Variety Special in 2017 for her work as one of the writers on Not the White House Correspondents' Dinner special for Full Frontal with Samantha Bee.
- Black has been nominated for three Primetime Emmy Awards for her work as a writer and correspondent on Full Frontal with Samantha Bee, once in 2016 and twice in 2017.
