= Christian Cultural Center =

Church in New York, United States

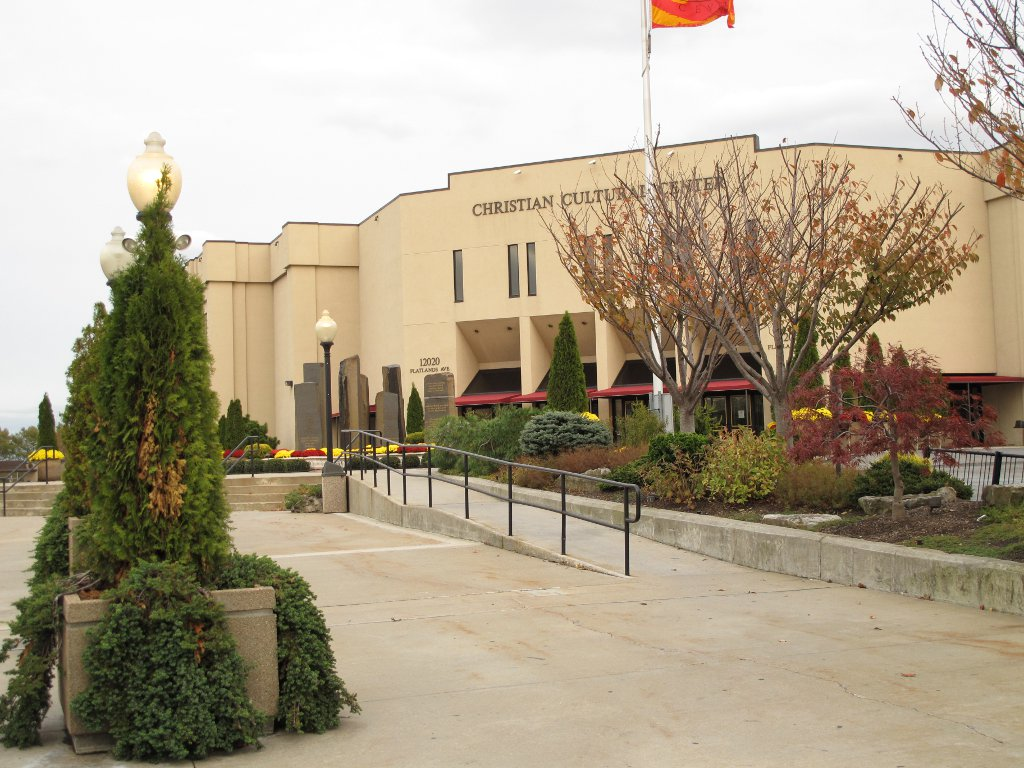
- The west side of the Christian Cultural Center.
- Christian Cultural Center
- 40.650820°N 73.888337°W
- Location: 12020 Flatlands Avenue; Brooklyn, New York 11207
- Country: United States
- Denomination: Non-denominational Christianity
- Website: CCCinfo.org

History
- Former name: Christian Life Center
- Founded: 1978
- Founder(s): Dr. A. R. Bernard & Pastor Karen Bernard

Clergy
- Pastor: Lady Rita Bernard Pastor A.R. Bernard Pastor Karen Bernard

The Christian Cultural Center (CCC) is a non-denominational Christian megachurch located in the Starrett City section of Brooklyn, New York City, with a satellite campus in Smithtown on Long Island. It is the largest Evangelical church in New York City.

== History ==
The Christian Cultural Center was founded in 1978 by Dr. A. R. Bernard. In 2000, it opened its main building, with a 5,000-seat auditorium. In 2022, the church claims over 32,000 members.
