= 2nd Critics Choice Real TV Awards =

2020 award ceremony

2nd Critics' Choice Real TV Awards
- Date: June 29, 2020
- Country: United States
- Presented by: Broadcast Television Journalists Association and NPACT
- Website: www.criticschoice.com/critics-choice-real-tv-awards/

The 2nd Critics' Choice Real TV Awards, presented by the Broadcast Television Journalists Association and NPACT, which recognizes excellence in nonfiction, unscripted and reality programming across broadcast, cable and streaming platforms, were held on June 29, 2020. The nominations were announced on June 8, 2020.

== Winners and nominees ==
Winners are listed first and highlighted in bold:

=== Programs ===
Competition Series	Competition Series: Talent/Variety
**RuPaul's Drag Race (VH1)**; LEGO Masters (Fox); Making It (NBC); Survivor (CBS); Top Chef (Bravo)	**The Voice (NBC)**; American Idol (ABC); Dancing with the Stars (ABC); La Voz (Telemundo); Songland (NBC)
Unstructured Series	Structured Series
**Cheer (Netflix)**; Couples Therapy (Showtime); Intervention (A&E); RuPaul's Drag Race: Untucked (VH1); We're Here (HBO)	**The World According to Jeff Goldblum (Disney+)**; Encore! (Disney+); Prop Culture (Disney+); Queer Eye (Netflix); Shark Tank (ABC)
Business Show	Sports Show
**Shark Tank (ABC)**; Gordon Ramsay's 24 Hours to Hell and Back (Fox); The Profit (CNBC); T-Pain's School of Business (Fuse); Undercover Boss (CBS)	**The Last Dance (ESPN)**; Blackballed (Quibi); Cheer (Netflix); Last Chance U (Netflix); Peyton's Places (ESPN+); Real Sports with Bryant Gumbel (HBO)
Crime/Justice Series	Ongoing Documentary Series
**Jeffrey Epstein: Filthy Rich (Netflix)**; Atlanta's Missing and Murdered: The Lost Children (HBO); The Innocence Files (Netflix); The Pharmacist (Netflix); Trial by Media (Netflix); The Trials of Gabriel Fernandez (Netflix)	**Frontline** (PBS); Abstract: The Art of Design (Netflix); The Circus: Inside the Craziest Political Campaign on Earth (Showtime); Last Chance U (Netflix); POV (PBS)
Limited Documentary Series	Short Form Series
**Hillary (Hulu)**; Atlanta's Missing and Murdered: The Lost Children (HBO); Cheer (Netflix); Jeffrey Epstein: Filthy Rich (Netflix); The Last Dance (ESPN); Trial by Media (Netflix); The Trials of Gabriel Fernandez (Netflix)	**Carpool Karaoke: The Series (Apple TV)**; Comeback Kids (The Dodo); Creating Saturday Night Live (NBC); The Daily Show with Trevor Noah: Between the Scenes (Comedy Central); The Impossible Row (Discovery); While Black with MK Asante (Snap)
Live Show	Interactive Show
**Chasing the Cure (TNT)**; Build (Yahoo!); Live PD (A&E); Talking Dead (AMC); Watch What Happens Live with Andy Cohen (Bravo)	**Watch What Happens Live with Andy Cohen (Bravo)**; Chasing the Cure (TNT); Enamorándonos (Univision); Talking Dead (AMC)
Culinary Show	Game Show
**Chopped (Food Network) (tie)**; **Top Chef (Bravo) (tie)**; Nailed It! (Netflix); Tournament of Champions (Food Network); Ugly Delicious (Netflix)	**Jeopardy! The Greatest of All Time (ABC)**; 25 Words or Less (Fox/Syndicated); Brain Games (National Geographic); Cash Cab (Bravo); Mental Samurai (Fox)
Travel/Adventure Series	Animal/Nature Show
**Somebody Feed Phil (Netflix)**; Expedition Unknown (Discovery); Extinct or Alive (Animal Planet); Gordon Ramsay: Uncharted (National Geographic); The Great Food Truck Race (Food Network)	**Seven Worlds, One Planet (BBC America)**; Dodo Heroes (Animal Planet); Dr. Oakley, Yukon Vet (Nat Geo Wild); Crikey! It's the Irwins (Animal Planet); Serengeti (Discovery)
Lifestyle: Fashion/Beauty Show	Relationship Show
**Queer Eye (Netflix)**; The Goop Lab (Netflix); Making the Cut (Amazon Prime Video); Next in Fashion (Netflix); Project Runway (Bravo)	**Love Is Blind (Netflix)**; 90 Day Fiancé (TLC); Are You the One? (MTV); Black Love (OWN); Couples Therapy (Showtime)
Lifestyle: Home/Garden Show
**A Very Brady Renovation (HGTV)**; Celebrity IOU (HGTV); Home (Apple TV+); Home Town (HGTV); Selling Sunset (Netflix)

=== Personality ===
Ensemble Cast in an Unscripted Series	Show Host
**Queer Eye (Netflix)**; Dancing with the Stars (ABC); Making the Cut (Amazon Prime Video); RuPaul's Drag Race (VH1); A Very Brady Renovation (HGTV); Crikey! It's the Irwins (Animal Planet)	**Alex Trebek for Jeopardy! (CBS)**; Will Arnett for LEGO Masters (Fox); RuPaul for RuPaul's Drag Race (VH1); Jeff Goldblum for The World According to Jeff Goldblum (Disney+); Nick Offerman and Amy Poehler for Making It (NBC); Jeff Probst for Survivor (CBS)
Female Star of the Year	Male Star of the Year
**Sandra Lee on Dr. Pimple Popper (TLC)**; Nicole Byer on Nailed It! (Netflix); Dr. Orna Guralnik on Couples Therapy (Showtime); Gwyneth Paltrow on The Goop Lab (Netflix); Michelle Visage on RuPaul's Drag Race (VH1); Monica Aldama on Cheer (Netflix)	**Jerry Harris on Cheer (Netflix)**; The Fab Five on Queer Eye (Netflix); Trevor Noah on The Daily Show with Trevor Noah (Comedy Central); RuPaul on RuPaul's Drag Race (VH1); Hasan Minhaj on Patriot Act with Hasan Minhaj (Netflix); Kevin Hart on Kevin Hart: What the Fit (YouTube Originals)

=== Achievement ===
Outstanding Achievement in Nonfiction Programming by a Network or Streaming Platform	Outstanding Achievement in Nonfiction Production
**Netflix**; A&E Networks; HBO; National Geographic; PBS; TLC	**Raw TV**; Anvil 1893 Entertainment; Big Fish Entertainment; Florentine Films; Kinetic Content; Smart Dog Media
Critics' Choice Real TV Impact Award
**Jeff Probst**

=== Most major nominations ===
Programs that received multiple nominations are listed below, by number of nominations per work and per network:

Shows that received multiple nominations
Nominations	Show	Network
6	RuPaul's Drag Race	VH1
5	Cheer	Netflix
4	Queer Eye	Netflix
3	Couples Therapy	Showtime
2	Atlanta's Missing and Murdered: The Lost Children	HBO
2	Chasing the Cure	TNT
2	Crikey! It's the Irwins	Animal Planet
2	Dancing with the Stars	ABC
2	The Goop Lab	Netflix
2	Jeffrey Epstein: Filthy Rich	Netflix
2	Last Chance U	Netflix
2	The Last Dance	ESPN
2	LEGO Masters	Fox
2	Making It	NBC
2	Making the Cut	Amazon Prime Video
2	Nailed It!	Netflix
2	Shark Tank	ABC
2	Survivor	CBS
2	Talking Dead	AMC
2	Top Chef	Bravo
2	Trial by Media	Netflix
2	The Trials of Gabriel Fernandez	Netflix
2	A Very Brady Renovation	HGTV
2	Watch What Happens Live with Andy Cohen	Bravo
2	The World According to Jeff Goldblum	Disney+

Nominations by network
Nominations	Network
31	Netflix
6	ABC
6	Bravo
6	VH1
5	Fox
5	HBO
5	NBC
4	Animal Planet
4	CBS
4	Disney+
4	HGTV
4	Showtime
3	A&E
3	Discovery Channel
3	Food Network
3	National Geographic
3	PBS
3	TLC
2	Amazon Prime Video
2	AMC
2	Comedy Central
2	ESPN
2	TNT

=== Most major wins ===
Shows that received multiple awards
Wins	Show	Network
2	Cheer	Netflix
2	Queer Eye	Netflix

Wins by network
Wins	Network
8	Netflix
2	ABC
2	Bravo
