= LaDarius =

LaDarius, Ladarius or La'Darius is a masculine given name of American origin which may either be a combination of the element la and the name Darius, which means 'hold firm the good', or a combination of the Greek word lados and the Latin word arius, which means 'princely' or 'noble'. It is often found among African Americans.

Notable people with the given name include:

- LaDarius Galloway (born 1997), American football player
- Ladarius Green (born 1990), American football player
- LaDarius Gunter (born 1992), American football player
- LaDarius Hamilton (born 1998), American football player
- LaDarius Henderson (born 2001), American football player
- La'Darius Marshall (born 1998), American cheerleader and television personality
- LaDarius Perkins (born 1990), American football player

== See also ==
- Ledarius Mack (born 1996), American football player
