= Morgan Simianer =

American cheerleader

Morgan Simianer is an American cheerleader and television personality. She received international recognition after appearing in the Netflix docuseries Cheer. She became a fan favorite due to her sweet personality and her troubled past.

== Personal life ==
Simianer is originally from Loveland, Colorado. When Simianer was a sophomore in high school, she and her brother were forced to live in a trailer after being abandoned by their father, who was living with his new wife and her children. Their mother disappeared when they were still very young. When her brother Wyatt turned 18, he left to go search for their mother and Morgan was left to live alone in the trailer. When her grandparents became aware of the situation, they invited her to live with them. She attended Navarro College in Corsicana, Texas, where she was a member of the cheer team coached by Monica Aldama. In January 2020, she appeared on The Ellen DeGeneres Show, along with other members of the team.

In May 2023, Simianer married Stone Burleson at a ceremony in Hickory Creek, Texas.

== Television ==
Year	Title	Notes
2020–2022	Cheer	Starring; 11 episodes
2025	Battle Camp	8th eliminated; 5 episodes
