= Trevor Denbow =

American football player (born 1998)

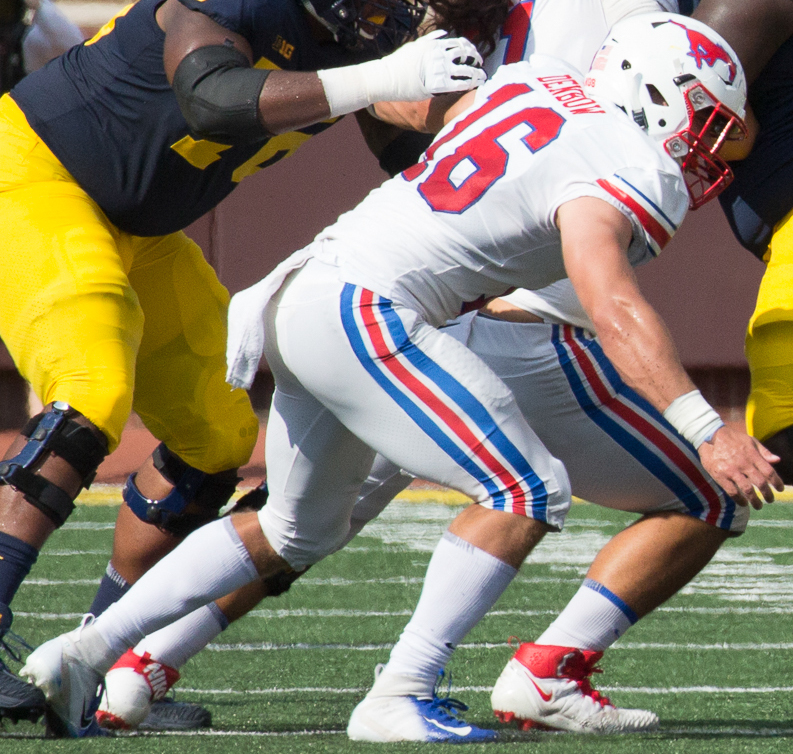
- Denbow with SMU in 2018

No. 43
- Position: Safety

Personal information
- Born: August 26, 1998 (age 28); Corsicana, Texas, U.S.
- Listed height: 5 ft 10 in (1.78 m)
- Listed weight: 208 lb (94 kg)

Career information
- High school: Corsicana (TX)
- College: Navarro (2017); SMU (2018–2021)
- NFL draft: 2022: undrafted

Career history
- Indianapolis Colts (2022)

Career NFL statistics as of 2023
- Total tackles: 12
- Stats at Pro Football Reference

Trevor Denbow (born August 26, 1998) is an American former professional football safety. He played college football for the Navarro Bulldogs and SMU Mustangs and was signed by the Colts as an undrafted free agent in 2022.

== Early life and education ==
Denbow was born on August 26, 1998, in Corsicana, Texas. He attended Corsicana High School and was named All-American by USA Today as a senior. He also earned District 17-5A Player of the Year honors. For his freshman year of college, Denbow attended Navarro and appeared in 10 games, recording 36 tackles and four interceptions.

Denbow accepted a scholarship offer from Southern Methodist University (SMU) in December 2017, and enrolled in January 2018. As a sophomore in 2018, he appeared in a total of 12 games, eight of which he played as a starter in. Denbow finished the season with 41 tackles, a half-sack, and 3.5 TFLs. In 2019, Denbow was selected third-team preseason all-conference by Phil Steele, and ended up starting all 13 games. He made 64 total tackles, a half-sack and one forced fumble. He also served as the team's punter, averaging 38.7 yards per attempt with a long of 72 yards that year.

In a COVID-19-shortened 2020 season, the senior Denbow started all 10 games and tallied 27 tackles, 7.0 TFLs and one sack, while also returning one interception for 11 yards. After being given an extra year of eligibility due to the pandemic, Denbow opted to return in 2021 for a super senior season. He finished the year having appeared in all 12 games, all but one as a starter, and recorded 40 total tackles as well as two interceptions.

== Professional career ==
Pre-draft measurables
Height	Weight	Arm length	Hand span	40-yard dash	10-yard split	20-yard split	20-yard shuttle	Three-cone drill	Vertical jump	Broad jump	Bench press
5 ft 11 in (1.80 m)	208 lb (94 kg)	31 in (0.79 m)	9 1/4 in (0.23 m)	4.57 s	1.56 s	2.64 s	4.10 s	7.03 s	38.5 in (0.98 m)	11 ft 0 in (3.35 m)	18 reps
All values from Pro Day

After going unselected in the 2022 NFL draft, Denbow was signed by the Indianapolis Colts as an undrafted free agent, being given a contract that included $10,000 guaranteed and a $15,000 signing bonus. He survived roster cuts and was named to the final roster in August, but was shortly afterwards placed on injured reserve. He was designated for return on October 26 and was activated five days later. Denbow made his NFL debut in the Colts' week nine loss to the New England Patriots, appearing on 16 special teams snaps. He was waived on November 22, and re-signed to the practice squad. He signed a reserve/future contract on January 9, 2023.

On January 8, 2024, Denbow signed a one-year contract extension with the Colts. In Week 8 against the Houston Texans, Denbow suffered a severe knee injury in the opening kickoff. After the injury revealed damage to his ACL, MCL, and other components of his knee, Denbow was placed on injured reserve on October 28, 2024.

== Personal life ==
Denbow is the grandson of Don Denbow, who served as mayor of Corsicana, was a star football player at SMU, and was a first-round draft choice of the Los Angeles Dodgers. He is the son-in-law of Monica Aldama, head cheer coach at Navarro College and focus of the Netflix docuseries Cheer.
