= Cheer Athletics =

American all-star cheerleading program

- Sport: Cheerleading
- Founded: 1994
- Based in: Austin, Texas; Charlotte, North Carolina; Columbus, Ohio; Dallas, Texas; Denver, Colorado; Frisco, Texas; Omaha, Nebraska; Pensacola, Florida; Pittsburgh, Pennsylvania; Plano, Texas; Rochester, New York; Rockwall, Texas; St. Louis, Missouri; Telford, England
- Colors: Royal Blue, Black and White
- Owner: Angela Rogers; Brad Habermel; Jody Melton
- Championships: 26 USASF World Championships, 61 Worlds Medals, 196 NCA National Titles
- Mascot: Cat

Cheer Athletics is one of the largest All-Star cheerleading programs in the United States, with thousands of athletes competing on 80+ teams from Austin, Texas; Charlotte, North Carolina; Chicago, Illinois; Columbus, Ohio; Dallas, Texas; Denver, Colorado; Frisco, Texas; Omaha, Nebraska; Pensacola, Florida; Pittsburgh, Pennsylvania; Plano, Texas; Rochester, New York; Rockwall, Texas; St. Louis, Missouri; and Telford, England. Cheer Athletics has won 24 World Championships at The Cheerleading Worlds sponsored by the USASF.

In 2007, CA's owner/coaches were ranked No. 1 in the country by American Cheerleader Magazine's list of the 25 Most Influential People in All-Star Cheerleading. Cheer Athletics teams have consistently outpaced other cheer programs with more than 70 National Titles from the National Cheerleaders Association (NCA) and earned 53 medals from the USASF Worlds.

In 2025, Cheer Athletics Plano filed for Chapter 11 bankruptcy protection, just one day before a trial against the company involving possible sex abuse began.

== History ==
1994-1995

Cheer Athletics began in May 1994 when co-founders Jody Melton and Angela Rogers began their first practice with two athletes at a local park in Plano, Texas.

1995-1996

The 1995–96 season brought many new challenges. Cheer Athletics had more than tripled in size since nationals, with three main teams: Panthers, Tigers, Jags. CA now had a total of 58 athletes and was tasting its first success at local and regional competitions.

1996-1997

The gym had now grown to have five teams: Cats, Jags, Tigers, Panthers, and Wildcats. Cheer Athletics debuted at the 1997 NCA All-Star Nationals.

1997-1998

Cheer Athletics had become the largest program in the country with eight teams: Cats, Jags, Tigers, Sabres, Cougars, Panthers, Wildcats, and Cheetahs. By the spring of 1998, Cheer Athletics moved into its own practice facility; a former baseball training center just down the street from NCA's main offices.

1998-1999

As Cheer Athletics expanded, there were now 13 teams: KittyKats, Cats, Jags, Bengals, Bobcats, Tigers, Thundercats, Sabres, Bearcats, Panthers, Pumas, Wildcats, and Cheetahs. Interested in this up-and-coming program, the New York Times Production Company sent a film crew to feature two Cheer Athletics teams in a documentary, "On the Inside: Cheerleading" which aired on Discovery Channel.

1999-2000

Cheer Athletics claimed more than 30 team titles over the course of the 1999–2000 season.

2000-2001

The 2000–2001 season brought their team national championship total to 53.

2001-2002

During the 2001/2002 season, the gym won more national titles than any other program has ever won in a single year, bringing home a staggering 33 team national championship titles during this single season, bringing their overall total to 86.

2002-2003

A successful season with 30 national championship titles brought the overall title count to 116.

2003-2004

Cheer Athletics was invited to compete in the first annual USASF World Championships. SuperCats won the first-ever World Championship in the Senior All Girl division.

2013

Cheer Athletics Austin was opened.

2014

New locations in Frisco, Texas and Charlotte, North Carolina were opened.

2016

A new location in Columbus, Ohio was opened.

2018

A new location in Pittsburgh, Pennsylvania was opened.

2020

New locations in Dallas, Texas; Denver, Colorado; and St. Louis, Missouri were opened.

2021

New locations in Omaha, Nebraska; Pensacola, Florida; and Rochester, New York are opened.

2023

First international location in Telford, United Kingdom opened.

== Teams: 24-25 Season ==
Cheer Athletics currently has 133 teams, ranging in age from 2 to adult.

This does not include all of the teams of location in Columbus, OH, Denver, CO, Omaha, NE, Pensacola, FL, Rockwall, TX, Telford, England, as they have yet to be officially published for 23-24 Season (as of 05/28/2023).

Level	Name	Size/Level	Location
Level 1 teams	Pink Ice	Small Youth 1	Austin, TX
Level 1 teams	Slate	U16 1	Austin, TX
Level 1 teams	AristoCats	Youth 1	Charlotte, NC
Level 1 teams	Clawstle Kittens	Tiny 1	Charlotte, NC
Level 1 teams	NobleCats	U17 1	Charlotte, NC
Level 1 teams	PoshCats	Mini 1	Dallas, TX
Level 1 teams	VanityCats	Junior 1	Dallas, TX
Level 1 teams	Meteorites	Medium Mini 1	Frisco, TX
Level 1 teams	MeteorCats	Small Youth 1	Frisco, TX
Level 1 teams	SolarCats	Small Junior 1	Frisco, TX
Level 1 teams	CopperKitties	Mini 1	Pittsburgh, PA
Level 1 teams	BobCats	Medium Mini 1	Plano, TX
Level 1 teams	Cheetah Cubs	Medium Tiny 1	Plano, TX
Level 1 teams	Itty Bitty Kitties	Small Tiny 1	Plano, TX
Level 1 teams	KittyKatz	Medium Youth 1	Plano, TX
Level 1 teams	Lady Lynx	Small Junior 1	Plano, TX
Level 1 teams	Roc City Kitties	Tiny Elite 1.1	Rochester, NY
Level 1 teams	TaxiCats	Youth 1	Rochester, NY
Level 1 teams	Times Square Tigers	Mini Elite 1	Rochester, NY
Level 1 teams	Blue Berries	Mini 1	St. Louis, MO
Level 1 teams	Denim Cats	Junior 1	St. Louis, MO
Level 1 teams	Tiffany Katz	Senior 1	St. Louis, MO
Level 2 teams	Topaz	Small Youth 2	Austin, TX
Level 2 teams	Jade	Junior 2	Austin, TX
Level 2 teams	EmbassyCats	U17 2	Charlotte, NC
Level 2 teams	EnchantedCats	Youth 2	Charlotte, NC
Level 2 teams	KnightCats	U19 2	Charlotte, NC
Level 2 teams	ChicCats	Youth 2	Dallas, TX
Level 2 teams	StarDust	Mini 2	Frisco, TX
Level 2 teams	AstroCats	Small Youth 2	Frisco, TX
Level 2 teams	CosmicCats	Small Junior 2	Frisco, TX
Level 2 teams	CobaltCats	Youth Flex 2	Pittsburgh, PA
Level 2 teams	Cougars	Medium Youth 2	Plano, TX
Level 2 teams	Cubs	Small Mini 2	Plano, TX
Level 2 teams	Katz	Medium Junior 2	Plano, TX
Level 2 teams	MagicKatz	Medium Mini 2	Plano, TX
Level 2 teams	Ocelots	Small Youth 2	Plano, TX
Level 2 teams	Sabres	Medium Senior 2	Plano, TX
Level 2 teams	BroadwayCats	Youth 2	Rochester, NY
Level 2 teams	ManhattanCats	Junior 2	Rochester, NY
Level 2 teams	Miss Amethyst	Youth 2	St. Louis, MO
Level 2 teams	JazzyCats	Junior 2	St. Louis, MO
Level 2 teams	Indigo Girls	Senior 2	St. Louis, MO
Level 3 teams	Pink Panthers	Small Junior 3	Austin, TX
Level 3 teams	Jewel	Medium Junior 3	Austin, TX
Level 3 teams	DivinityCats	U17 3	Charlotte, NC
Level 3 teams	PrincessCats	Junior 3	Charlotte, NC
Level 3 teams	Royal Court	Youth 3	Charlotte, NC
Level 3 teams	DivaCats	Junior 3	Dallas, TX
Level 3 teams	NovaCats	Small Youth 3	Frisco, TX
Level 3 teams	NebulaCats	Medium Junior 3	Frisco, TX
Level 3 teams	ElectriCats	Small Youth 3	Plano, TX
Level 3 teams	FireCats	Small Senior Coed 3	Plano, TX
Level 3 teams	IceCats	Small Junior 3	Plano, TX
Level 3 teams	Lions	Medium Youth 3	Plano, TX
Level 3 teams	Wick3d Jags	Junior 2	Rochester, NY
Level 3 teams	Saxy Cats	Senior 3	St. Louis, MO
Level 4 & 4.2 teams	CrownCats	Senior 4.2	Charlotte, NC
Level 4 & 4.2 teams	DynastyCats	Junior 4	Charlotte, NC
Level 4 & 4.2 teams	Junior Prodigy	U17 4	Charlotte, NC
Level 4 & 4.2 teams	Lady Prodigy	U19 4	Charlotte, NC
Level 4 & 4.2 teams	LuxeCats	Junior 4	Dallas, TX
Level 4 & 4.2 teams	G-4ce Jags	Medium Junior 4	Frisco, TX
Level 4 & 4.2 teams	GalactiCats	Small Senior 4	Frisco, TX
Level 4 & 4.2 teams	Stellar Scratch	Small Senior 4.2	Frisco, TX
Level 4 & 4.2 teams	LithiumCats	Medium Junior 4 Flex	Pittsburgh, PA
Level 4 & 4.2 teams	IronCats	Small Senior 4.2	Pittsburgh, PA
Level 4 & 4.2 teams	Bengals	Small Junior 4	Plano, TX
Level 4 & 4.2 teams	Tigers	Small Senior 4	Plano, TX
Level 4 & 4.2 teams	ThunderCats	Medium Junior 4	Plano, TX
Level 4 & 4.2 teams	SassyCats	Medium Senior 4	Plano, TX
Level 4 & 4.2 teams	WonderKatz	Medium Youth 4	Plano, TX
Level 4 & 4.2 teams	AlleyKatz	Junior 4	Rochester, NY
Level 4 & 4.2 teams	BoogieCats	Senior Coed 4	St. Louis, MO
Level 5 Teams	Cartier	Small Senior Coed 5	Austin, TX
Level 5 Teams	ReignCats	Senior Open Coed 5	Charlotte, NC
Level 5 Teams	SuperiorCats	Junior 5	Charlotte, NC
Level 5 Teams	SlayCats	Small Senior Coed 5	Dallas, TX
Level 5 Teams	Eclipse	Small Junior 5	Frisco, TX
Level 5 Teams	Vixens	medium senior 5	Plano, TX
Level 5 Teams	FuryCats	Large Junior 5	Plano, TX
Level 5 Teams	Pumas	Level 5 Senior Large Coed	Plano, TX
Level 5 Teams	Soul	U19 Coed 5	St. Louis, MO
Level 6 teams	Black Diamond	Senior Open 6	Austin, TX
Level 6 teams	Lady Legacy	International Open 6	Charlotte, NC
Level 6 teams	QueenCats	International Open NT 6	Charlotte, NC
Level 6 teams	RoyalCats	International Large Coed 6	Charlotte, NC
Level 6 teams	SteelCats	Small Senior 6	Pittsburgh, PA
Level 6 teams	Cheetahs	Senior Coed 6	Plano, TX
Level 6 teams	Felines	U18 NT 6	Plano, TX
Level 6 teams	Jags	Large Junior 6	Plano, TX
Level 6 teams	FierceKatz	Medium Senior 6	Plano, TX
Level 6 teams	Panthers	Large Senior 6	Plano, TX
Level 6 teams	Savage6	Small Junior Coed 6	Plano, TX
Level 6 teams	SwooshCats	International Open Small Coed 6	Plano, TX
Level 6 teams	Wildcats	Senior Open Coed 6	Plano, TX
Level 6 teams	Big City Cats	Extra Small Senior Coed 6	Rochester, NY
Level 6 teams	ShowCats	International Open NT 6	Rochester, NY
Level 6 teams	NavyCats	Global Coed 6	St. Louis, MO
Level 7 teams	Claw	International Open Coed 7	Plano, TX
Cheer Abilities	SuperKatz	Special Athletes Novice	Plano, TX
Cheer Abilities	StarCats		Rochester, NY
Cheer Abilities	ShineKats		Pittsburgh, PA
Show Teams	Tiny Diamonds	Show Team Level 1	Austin, TX
Show Teams	Kitty Claws	Tiny Novice	Charlotte, NC
Show Teams	Show Stoppers	Ages 3–5	Dallas, TX
Show Teams	Little Dippers	Exhibition 1	Frisco, TX
Show Teams	Show Kittens	Exhibition	Plano, TX
Prep/Novice Teams	Emerald	Prep Level 1	Austin, TX
Prep/Novice Teams	PremierCats	Junior Prep 1.1	Charlotte, NC
Prep/Novice Teams	GlitterKatz	Tiny Prep 1.1	Dallas, TX
Prep/Novice Teams	ShimmerKatz	Youth Prep 1.1	Dallas, TX
Prep/Novice Teams	Tiny StarCats	Catalyst Tiny 1.1	Frisco, TX
Prep/Novice Teams	Starlites	Catalyst Mini 1.1	Frisco, TX
Prep/Novice Teams	White StarCats	Catalyst Junior 1.1	Frisco, TX
Prep/Novice Teams	KryptonKitties	Tiny Novice 1	Pittsburgh, PA
Prep/Novice Teams	Black Tigers	Catalyst Tiny 1.1	Plano, TX
Prep/Novice Teams	White Tigers	Catalyst Youth 1.1	Plano, TX
Prep/Novice Teams	IdolCats	Mini Prep 1.1	Rochester, NY
Prep/Novice Teams	Spotlight Cubs	Tiny Novice 1.1	Rochester, NY
Prep/Novice Teams	Periwinkle Kittens	Tiny Novice 1	St. Louis, MO
Stunt Teams	MetalliCats	11U	Pittsburgh, PA
Stunt Teams	ClawCats	18U	Pittsburgh, PA
Stunt Teams	Scratch6	International Open Stunt Specialties 6	Plano, TX
Stunt Teams	Cadet	Performance Team	St. Louis, MO
Stunt Teams	Marine	U14	St. Louis, MO
Stunt Teams	Midnight	U18	St. Louis, MO

== Awards and Accomplishments ==
=== NCA Nationals Results ===
	Medals
Grand/Program Champions	30
National Champions	196

=== Cheerleading Worlds Results ===
	Year	Team	Place	Division
1st place, gold medalist(s)	2004	Supercats	1st place	Senior All Girl
2nd place, silver medalist(s)	2005	Supercats	2nd place	Large Senior All Girl
2nd place, silver medalist(s)	2005	Wildcats	2nd place	Large Senior Coed 5
1st place, gold medalist(s)	2006	Jags	1st place	Small Senior All Girl 5
1st place, gold medalist(s)	2006	Panthers	1st place	Large Senior All Girl 5
1st place, gold medalist(s)	2006	Wildcats	1st place	Large Senior Coed 5
	2006	Wonder Cats	8th place	Small Senior Coed
2nd place, silver medalist(s)	2007	Panthers	2nd place	Large Senior All Girl 5
2nd place, silver medalist(s)	2007	Wildcats	2nd place	Large Senior Coed 5
	2007	Jags	6th place	Small Senior All Girl 5
1st place, gold medalist(s)	2008	Fiercekatz	1st place	International Open All Girl 5
1st place, gold medalist(s)	2008	Pumas	1st place	International Small Open Coed 5
3rd place, bronze medalist(s)	2008	Jungle Cats	3rd place	International Large Open Coed
	2008	Wildcats	4th Place	Large Senior Unlimited Coed 5
	2008	Panthers	7th place	Large Senior All Girl 5
1st place, gold medalist(s)	2009	Wildcats	1st place	International Open Coed 5
1st place, gold medalist(s)	2009	Fiercekatz	1st place	International Open All Girl 5
1st place, gold medalist(s)	2009	Jags	1st place	International Junior Coed 5
2nd place, silver medalist(s)	2009	Panthers	2nd place	Large Senior All-Girl 5
2nd place, silver medalist(s)	2010	Jags	2nd place	International Junior Coed 5
2nd place, silver medalist(s)	2010	Wildcats	2nd place	International Coed 5
3rd place, bronze medalist(s)	2010	Panthers	3rd place	Large Senior All-Girl 5
3rd place, bronze medalist(s)	2010	Fiercekatz	3rd place	International All Girl 5
1st place, gold medalist(s)	2011	Panthers	1st place	Small Senior All Girl 5
3rd place, bronze medalist(s)	2011	Cheetahs	3rd place	Large Senior Semi Limited Coed 5
3rd place, bronze medalist(s)	2011	Fiercekatz	3rd place	International All Girl 5
1st place, gold medalist(s)	2012	Cheetahs	1st place	Large Senior Coed 5
1st place, gold medalist(s)	2012	Panthers	1st place	Medium Senior All Girl 5
1st place, gold medalist(s)	2012	Ladykatz	1st place	International Open All Girl 6
1st place, gold medalist(s)	2012	Crewkatz	1st place	Dance Team
3rd place, bronze medalist(s)	2012	Wildcats	3rd place	International Open Coed 5
3rd place, bronze medalist(s)	2012	FierceKatz	3rd place	International Open All Girl
1st place, gold medalist(s)	2013	Wildcats	1st place	International Open Coed 5
2nd place, silver medalist(s)	2013	Cheetahs	2nd place	Large Senior Coed 5
2nd place, silver medalist(s)	2013	Panthers	2nd place	Large Senior All Girl 5
	2013	Ladykatz	5th place	International Open All Girl 6
	2013	Swooshcats	8th place	Medium Senior All Girl 5
1st place, gold medalist(s)	2014	Ladykatz	1st Place	International Open All Girl 6
1st place, gold medalist(s)	2014	Wildcats	1st Place	International Open Coed 5
3rd place, bronze medalist(s)	2014	Panthers	3rd Place	Large Senior 5
	2014	Cheetahs	5th Place	Large Senior Coed 5
	2014	Swooshcats	10th Place	Medium Senior 5
2nd place, silver medalist(s)	2015	Wildcats	2nd Place	International Open Coed 5
2nd place, silver medalist(s)	2015	Claw 6	2nd Place	International Open Coed 6
2nd place, silver medalist(s)	2015	Fiercekatz	2nd Place	International Open All Girl 5
3rd place, bronze medalist(s)	2015	Panthers	3rd Place	Large Senior 5
	2015	Ladykatz	4th Place	International Open All Girl 6
	2015	Cheetahs	5th Place	Large Senior Coed 5
	2015	Junglecats	10th place	Medium Senior Coed 5
1st place, gold medalist(s)	2016	Cheetahs	1st Place	Large Senior Coed 5
1st place, gold medalist(s)	2016	Wildcats	1st Place	International Large Open Coed 5
1st place, gold medalist(s)	2016	Swooshcats	1st Place	International Open Small Coed 5
1st place, gold medalist(s)	2016	Claw 6	1st Place	International Large Open Coed 6
3rd place, bronze medalist(s)	2016	Panthers	3rd Place	Large Senior 5
	2016	LadyKatz	4th Place	International Open 6
	2016	Junglecats	15th Place (prelims)	Medium Senior Coed 5
	2016	RoyalCats	15th Place (prelims)	Senior small Coed 5
	2016	QueenCats	19th Place (prelims)	International Open 5
1st place, gold medalist(s)	2017	Swooshcats	1st Place	International Small Open Coed 5
2nd place, silver medalist(s)	2017	Panthers	2nd Place	Large Senior 5
2nd place, silver medalist(s)	2017	Cheetahs	2nd Place	Large Senior Coed 5
2nd place, silver medalist(s)	2017	Claw 6	2nd Place	International Large Open Coed 6
3rd place, bronze medalist(s)	2017	Wildcats	3rd Place	International Large Open Coed 5
	2017	OnyxCats	Semi-Finalist	Small Senior 5
	2017	AthenaCats	Semi-Finalist	Medium Senior 5
	2017	FierceKatz	Semi-Finalist	International Open 5
	2017	RoyalCats	Semi-Finalist	Small Senior Coed 5
	2017	Coalition6	Semi-Finalist	International Small Open Coed 6
	2017	KingCats	Trials	International Open Coed 5
	2017	Black Diamond	Trials	International Open Coed 5
1st place, gold medalist(s)	2018	Panthers	1st Place	Large Senior 5
1st place, gold medalist(s)	2018	Cheetahs	1st Place	Large Senior Coed 5
1st place, gold medalist(s)	2018	Claw 6	1st Place	International Large Open Coed 6
2nd place, silver medalist(s)	2018	Swooshcats	2nd Place	International Small Open Coed 5
2nd place, silver medalist(s)	2018	Wildcats	2nd Place	International Large Open Coed 5
	2018	ZeusCats	9th Place	Small Senior Coed 5
	2018	Lady Legacy	Finalist	Small Senior 5
	2018	OnyxCats	Semi-Finalist	Medium Senior 5
	2018	RoyalCats	Semi-Finalist	Small Senior Coed 5
	2018	FierceKatz	Semi-Finalist	International Open 5
	2018	KingCats	Semi-Finalist	International Open Coed 5
	2018	Coalition6	Semi-Finalist	International Small Open Coed 6
1st place, gold medalist(s)	2019	Wildcats	1st Place	Large Senior Open Coed 5
2nd place, silver medalist(s)	2019	LadyCats	2nd Place	International Global 5
3rd place, bronze medalist(s)	2019	Panthers	3rd Place	Large Senior 5
3rd place, bronze medalist(s)	2019	Cheetahs	3rd Place	Large Senior Coed 5
3rd place, bronze medalist(s)	2019	ThroneCats	3rd Place	International Open Coed Non Tumble 5
3rd place, bronze medalist(s)	2019	CLAW6	3rd Place	Large International Open Coed 6
	2019	RoyalCats	4th Place	Small Senior Open Coed 5
	2019	PlatinumCats	4th Place	International Open 5
	2019	ZeusCats	8th Place	Small Senior Coed 5
	2019	Crewcats	10th Place	Small Senior Open Coed 5
	2019	Swooshcats	Semi-Finalists	Small International Open 5
	2019	OnyxCats	Semi-Finalists	International Global Coed 5
	2019	SteelCats	Semi-Finalists	Small Senior Open Coed 5
1st place, gold medalist(s)	2021	Wildcats	1st Place	Large Senior Open Coed 6
1st place, gold medalist(s)	2021	CrewCats	1st Place	International Global Coed 6
1st place, gold medalist(s)	2021	LadyCats	1st Place	International Global 6
1st place, gold medalist(s)	2021	RoyalCats	Joint 1st Place	Large International Open Coed 6
3rd place, bronze medalist(s)	2021	PlatinumCats	3rd Place	International Open 6
3rd place, bronze medalist(s)	2021	Cheetahs	3rd Place	Large Senior Coed 6
	2021	Panthers	4th Place	Large Senior 6
	2021	Scatch6	4th Place	International Open Non-Tumble 6
	2021	Swooshcats	5th Place	Small International Open Coed 6
	2021	OnyxCats	7th Place	XSmall Senior Coed 6
	2021	PhantomCats	7th Place	International Open Coed Non-Tumble 6
	2021	QueenCats	9th Place	International Open Non-Tumble 6
	2021	Kryptonite	15th Place	International Open Coed Non-Tumble 6
	2021	SteelCats	Semi-Finalists	Small Senior Open Coed 6
	2021	Soul Sisters	Semi-Finalists	XSmall Senior 6
	2021	FloraCats	Semi-Finalists	International Open Non-Tumble 6
	2021	Black Diamonds	Semi-Finalists	International Open Non-Tumble 6
	2021	CobaltCats	Semi-Finalists	International Open Coed Non-Tumble 6
	2021	NavyCats	Semi-Finalists	International Open Coed Non-Tumble 6
2nd place, silver medalist(s)	2022	Wildcats	2nd Place	Senior Open Large Coed 6
3rd place, bronze medalist(s)	2022	Cheetahs	3rd Place	Large Senior Coed 6
	2022	Panthers	4th Place	Large Senior 6
	2022	Ladycats	4th Place	International Global Club 6
	2022	ZeusCats	9th Place	Senior Open Large Coed 6
	2022	OnyxCats	10th Place	Extra Small Senior Coed 6
	2022	Snow Angels	Semi-Finalists	Extra Small Senior 6
	2022	SteelCats	Semi-Finalists	Senior Open Small Coed 6
	2022	CoAsT 6	Semi-Finalists	Senior Open Small Coed 6
	2022	Lady Legacy	Semi-Finalists	International Open 6
	2022	PlatinumCats	Semi-Finalists	International Open 6
	2022	Swooshcats	Semi-Finalists	International Open Small Coed 6
	2022	Royal Cats	Semi-Finalists	International Open Large Coed 6
	2022	Scratch6	Semi-Finalists	International Open Non-Tumbling 6
	2022	FloraCats	Semi-Finalists	International Open Non-Tumbling 6
	2022	NauticalCats	Semi-Finalists	International Open Non-Tumbling 6
	2022	QueenCats	Semi-Finalists	International Open Non-Tumbling 6
	2022	PhantomCats	Semi-Finalists	International Open Non-Tumbling Coed 6
	2022	NavyCats	Semi-Finalists	International Open Non-Tumbling Coed 6
	2022	Crewcats	Semi-Finalists	International Global Club Coed 6
	2022	Claw	Semi-Finalists	International Open Large Coed 7
2nd place, silver medalist(s)	2023	Panthers	2nd Place	Large Senior 6
2nd place, silver medalist(s)	2023	Cheetahs	2nd Place	Large Senior Coed 6
2nd place, silver medalist(s)	2023	Wildcats	2nd Place	Senior Open Large Coed 6
2nd place, silver medalist(s)	2023	Swooshcats	2nd Place	International Open Small Coed 6
	2023	KingCats	5th Place	Senior Open Small Coed 6
	2023	Black Diamond	5th Place	Senior Open Large Coed 6
	2023	SteelCats	9th Place	Senior Open Small Coed 6
	2023	Miss Meow	Semi-Finalists	Extra Small Senior 6
	2023	Snow Angels	Semi-Finalists	Extra Small Senior 6
	2023	RoyalCats	Semi-Finalists	Extra Small Senior Coed 6
	2023	Coast 6	Semi-Finalists	Senior Open Coed 6
	2023	Lady Royalty	Semi-Finalists	International U18 NT 6
	2023	Felines	Semi-Finalists	International U18 NT Coed 6
	2023	Scratch6	Semi-Finalists	International Open NT 6
1st place, gold medalist(s)	2024	Panthers	1st Place	Large Senior 6
1st place, gold medalist(s)	2024	Black Ice	1st Place	International U18 NT Coed 6
1st place, gold medalist(s)	2024	Swooshcats	1st Place	International Open Small Coed 6
2nd place, silver medalist(s)	2024	Cheetahs	2nd Place	Large Senior Coed 6
2nd place, silver medalist(s)	2024	Wildcats	2nd Place	International Open Large Coed 6
3rd place, bronze medalist(s)	2024	Rage	3rd Place	International Open Small Coed 6
	2024	Lady Suns	4th Place	Extra Small Senior 6
	2024	Scratch6	4th Place	International Open NT 6
	2024	SteelCats	8th Place	Extra Small Senior 6
	2024	RoyalCats	8th Place	Small Senior Coed 6
	2024	FierceKatz	8th Place	Medium Senior 6
	2024	Black Diamond	Semi-Finalists	Extra Small Senior Coed 6
	2024	SlateCats	Semi-Finalists	International Open Small Coed 6
	2024	KingCats	Semi-Finalists	International Open Small Coed 7
	2024	Lady Royalty	Semi-Finalists	International U18 NT 6
	2024	Felines	Semi Finalists	International U18 NT 6
	2024	Rol6x	Semi-Finalists	International Open NT Coed 6
	2024	Junglecats	12th Place (Prelims)	International U18 NT Coed 6
2nd place, silver medalist(s)	2025	Wildcats	2nd Place	International Open Large Coed 6
3rd place, bronze medalist(s)	2025	Swooshcats	3rd Place	International Open Small Coed 6
3rd place, bronze medalist(s)	2025	Cheetahs	3rd Place	Senior Large Coed 6
3rd place, bronze medalist(s)	2025	KingCats	3rd Place	International Open Large Coed 7
3rd place, bronze medalist(s)	2025	Black Ice	3rd Place	International U18 NT 6
	2025	Panthers	4th Place	Senior Large 6
	2025	Scratch 6	4th Place	International Open NT 6
	2025	RoyalCats	7th Place	Senior Extra Small 6
	2025	FierceKatz	8th Place	Senior Medium 6
	2025	Steelcats	9th Place	Senior Extra Small Coed 6
	2025	LadySuns	10th Place	Senior Extra Small 6
	2025	Felines	3rd Place (Prelims)	International U18 NT 6
2nd place, silver medalist(s)	2026	Lady Royalty	2nd Place	International U18 NT 6
3rd place, bronze medalist(s)	2026	Cheetahs	3rd Place	Large Coed 6
3rd place, bronze medalist(s)	2026	Wildcats	3rd Place	International Open Large Coed 6
	2026	Swooshcats	4th Place	International Open Small Coed 6
	2026	Panthers	5th Place	Senior Large 6
	2026	RoyalCats	6th Place	Senior Extra Small 6
	2026	Lady Suns	6th Place	Senior Small 6
	2026	Scratch 6	8th Place	International Open NT 6
	2026	Vi6ious	9th Place	Senior Extra Small 6
	2026	War Cats	Semi-Finalists	Extra Small Coed 6
	2026	Black Diamond	Semi-Finalists	Extra Small Coed 6
	2026	Steelcats	Semi-Finalists	Senior Small 6
	2026	Felines	Semi-Finalists	International U18 NT6
	2026	Rage	Semi-Finalists	International Open NT Coed 6
	2026	Eternal	Semi-Finalists	International Open Small Coed 6
	2026	FloraCats	Semi-Finalists	International U18 NT 6
	2026	Black Ice	Semi-Finalists	International U18 NT 6
	2026	Felines	Semi-Finalists	International U18 NT 6
	2026	Rage	Semi-Finalists	International Open NT Coed 6
	2026	LEGACYCATS	Semi-Finalists	International Open NT Coed 7

=== Cheerleading Summit Results ===
	Year	Location	Team	Place	Division
1st place, gold medalist(s)	2014	Plano, TX	KittyKatz	1st place	Level 1 Small Youth
1st place, gold medalist(s)	2014	Plano, TX	Jags	1st Place	Level 5 Small Junior
1st place, gold medalist(s)	2015	Plano, TX	KittyKatz	1st place	Level 1 Small Youth
2nd place, silver medalist(s)	2015	Plano, TX	SassyCats	2nd Place	Level 4 Large Senior
3rd place, bronze medalist(s)	2015		Sabres	3rd Place	Level 2 Large Senior
1st place, gold medalist(s)	2016	Plano, TX	KittyKatz	1st Place	Level 1 Large Youth
1st place, gold medalist(s)	2016	Plano, TX	Thundercats	1st Place	Level 4 Large Junior
2nd place, silver medalist(s)	2016	Charlotte	AristoCats	2nd Place	Level 1 Large Youth
2nd place, silver medalist(s)	2016	Plano, TX	Cougars	2nd Place	Level 2 Large Youth
2nd place, silver medalist(s)	2016	Plano, TX	Jags	2nd Place	Level 5 Large Junior Coed
2nd place, silver medalist(s)	2016	Plano, TX	Furycats	2nd Place	Level 5 Large Junior Restricted
3rd place, bronze medalist(s)	2016	Plano, TX	WonderKatz	3rd Place	Level 4 Small Youth
3rd place, bronze medalist(s)	2016	Plano, TX	Sassycats	3rd Place	Level 4 Large Senior
3rd place, bronze medalist(s)	2016	Charlotte	ReignCats	3rd Place	Level 5 Large Senior Restricted
	2016	Austin	PearlCats	4th Place	Level 4.2 Large Senior Coed
	2016	Plano	Pumas	4th Place	Level 5 Large Senior Restricted
	2016	Plano	Firecats	5th Place TIE	Level 3 Large Senior
	2016	Frisco	MeteorCats	10th place	Level 1 Small Youth
	2016		Sabres	10th Place	Level 2 Large Senior
	2016	Charlotte	Regal Cats	10th Place	Level 4 Large Senior
	2016		Bear Katz	12th Place	Level 1 Small Junior
1st place, gold medalist(s)	2017	Plano	KittyKatz	1st Place	Level 1 Large Youth
1st place, gold medalist(s)	2017		Artic Cats	1st Place	Level 1 Small Senior
1st place, gold medalist(s)	2017		Sabres	1st Place	Level 2 Large Senior
1st place, gold medalist(s)	2017	Austin	PearlCats	1st Place	Level 4.2 Large Senior
1st place, gold medalist(s)	2017	Plano	SassyCats	1st Place	Level 4 Large Senior
1st place, gold medalist(s)	2017	Plano	Jags	1st Place	Level 5 Large Junior
1st place, gold medalist(s)	2017	Charlotte	SuperiorCats	1st Place	Level 5 Small Junior Restricted Coed
1st place, gold medalist(s)	2017	Plano	Furycats	1st Place	Level 5 Large Junior Restricted Coed
2nd place, silver medalist(s)	2017		Lions	2nd Place	Level 3 Large Youth
2nd place, silver medalist(s)	2017		ThunderCats	2nd Place	Level 4 Large Junior
3rd place, bronze medalist(s)	2017	Columbus	BetaCats	3rd Place	Level 2 Small Junior
3rd place, bronze medalist(s)	2017	Charlotte	ReignCats	3rd Place	Level 5 Small Senior Restricted
3rd place, bronze medalist(s)	2017	Columbus	AlphaCats	3rd Place	Level 5 Small Senior Restricted Coed
3rd place, bronze medalist(s)	2017		Cougars	3rd Place TIE	Level 2 Large Youth
3rd place, bronze medalist(s)	2017		FireCats	3rd Place TIE	Level 3 Large Senior
	2017		BearKatz	4th Place	Level 1 Small Junior
	2017		Pumas	4th Place	Level 5 Small Senior Restricted Coed
	2017	Austin	CrystalCats	4th Place	Level 5 Small Junior Restricted Coed
	2017	Austin	ChromeCats	4th Place	Level 4 Large Senior Coed
	2017		NebulaCats	5th Place	Level 3 Large Junior
	2017	Frisco	MeteorCats	8th Place	Level 1 Large Youth
	2017	Charlotte	RegalCats	10th Place	Level 4 Large Senior
	2017		Katz	12th Place	Level 2 Large Junior
1st place, gold medalist(s)	2018		KittyKatz	1st Place	Level 1 Medium Youth
1st place, gold medalist(s)	2018		Lions	1st Place	Level 3 Medium Youth
1st place, gold medalist(s)	2018		SassyCats	1st Place	Level 4 Medium Senior
2nd place, silver medalist(s)	2018		Cougars	2nd Place	Level 2 Medium Youth
2nd place, silver medalist(s)	2018		Sabres	2nd Place	Level 2 Medium Senior
2nd place, silver medalist(s)	2018		Jags	2nd Place	Level 5 Large Junior Coed
3rd place, bronze medalist(s)	2018	Columbus	CupidCats Coed	3rd Place	Level 4 International Junior Coed
3rd place, bronze medalist(s)	2018	Charlotte	ReignCats	3rd Place	Level 5 Small Senior Restricted Coed
3rd place, bronze medalist(s)	2018		SwagCats	3rd Place	Level 5 Large Senior Restricted Coed
	2018	Frisco	CosmicCats	4th Place	Level 2 Medium Junior
	2018	Frisco	MeteorCats	4th Place	Level 1 Small Youth
	2018		Firecats	4th Place	Level 3 Medium Senior Coed
	2018	Charlotte	SuperiorCats	4th Place	Level 5 Large Junior Restricted
	2018	Columbus	OmegaCats	5th Place	Level 2 Small Senior
	2018	Frisco	NebulaCats	5th Place	Level 3 Medium Junior
	2018	Frisco	LunaCats	5th Place	Level 3 Small Senior
	2018	Austin	PearlCats	5th Place	Level 4.2 Medium Senior Coed
	2018	Charlotte	CrownCats	6th Place	Level 4.2 Small Senior Coed
	2018	Columbus	VenusCats	8th Place	Level 3 Small Senior
	2018		Thundercats	8th Place	Level 4 Medium Junior
	2018	Columbus	AdonisCats	9th Place	Level 3 Medium Junior
	2018		Prowlers	9th Place	Level 4 Medium Senior Coed
	2018	Austin	ChromeCats	10th Place	Level 4 Medium Senior Coed
	2018	Frisco	AstroCats	10th Place	Level 2 Medium Youth
	2018	Charlotte	PrincessCats	10th Place	Level 3 Small Youth
	2018	Charlotte	RegalCats	12th Place	Level 4 Medium Senior
1st place, gold medalist(s)	2019	Plano	KittyKatz	1st Place	Level 1 Medium Youth
1st place, gold medalist(s)	2019	Plano	Ocelots	1st Place	Level 2 Small Youth
1st place, gold medalist(s)	2019	Plano	Sabres	1st Place	Level 2 Medium Senior
1st place, gold medalist(s)	2019	Charlotte	CrownCats	1st Place TIE	Level 4.2 Small Senior
2nd place, silver medalist(s)	2019	Plano	Cougars	2nd Place	Level 2 Medium Youth
2nd place, silver medalist(s)	2019	Pittsburgh	TitaniumCats	2nd Place	Level 2 Medium Junior
2nd place, silver medalist(s)	2019	Plano	Lions	2nd Place	Level 3 Medium Youth
2nd place, silver medalist(s)	2019	Charlotte	SuperiorCats	2nd Place	Level 5 Small Junior Restricted
2nd place, silver medalist(s)	2019	Plano	Tigers	2nd Place	Level 4 International Junior
2nd place, silver medalist(s)	2019	Plano	SavageCats	2nd Place	Level 4 International Open Coed
2nd place, silver medalist(s)	2019	Plano	Leopards	2nd Place TIE	Level 2 Small Junior
2nd place, silver medalist(s)	2019	Pittsburgh	BronzeCats	2nd Place TIE	Level 3 Medium Senior
3rd place, bronze medalist(s)	2019	Charlotte	PrincessCats	3rd Place	Level 3 Small Youth
3rd place, bronze medalist(s)	2019	Pittsburgh	IronCats	3rd Place	Level 4.2 Medium Senior
3rd place, bronze medalist(s)	2019	Plano	IceCats	3rd Place	Level 3 Small Junior
3rd place, bronze medalist(s)	2019	Frisco	GalactiCats	3rd Place	Level 4 Small Senior
3rd place, bronze medalist(s)	2019	Plano	Sassycats	3rd Place	Level 4 Medium Senior
3rd place, bronze medalist(s)	2019	Plano	Jags	3rd Place	Level 5 Large Junior Coed
	2019	Frisco	AstroCats	5th Place	Level 2 Small Youth
	2019	Columbus	SirenCats	5th Place	Level 1 Small Junior
	2019	Pittsburgh	VibeCats	5th Place	Level 3 Medium Junior
	2019	Charlotte	ReignCats	5th Place	Level 5 Small Senior Restricted Coed
	2019	Frisco	SolarCats	6th Place	Level 1 Small Junior
	2019	Frisco	LunaCats	6th Place	Level 3 Small Senior
	2019	Columbus	CupidCats	6th Place	Level 4 Small Junior
	2019	Plano	FuryCats	6th Place	Level 5 Small Junior Restricted Coed
	2019	Columbus	AlphaCats	6th Place	Level 5 Large Senior Restricted Coed
	2019	Plano	Arctic Cats	7th Place TIE	Level 1 Small Senior
	2019	Pittsburgh	BrassCats	8th Place	Level 4 Medium Senior Coed
	2019	Pittsburgh	ChromeCats	8th Place	Level 5 Small Junior Coed
	2019	Austin	RubyCats	9th Place	Level 4 Medium Junior
	2019	Plano	LightningCats	9th Place	Level 3 International Junior
	2019	Frisco	CometCats	10th Place	Level 2 Small Senior
	2019	Plano	Prowlers	10th Place	Level 4 Medium Senior Coed
	2019	Charlotte	DivinityCats	13th Place	Level 3 Small Senior
	2019	Charlotte	RegalCats	17th Place	Level 4 Small Senior
1st place, gold medalist(s)	2021	Plano	FuryCats	1st Place	Level 5 Junior Large
1st place, gold medalist(s)	2021	Charlotte	Junior Royalty	1st Place	Level 6 Junior Small Coed
2nd place, silver medalist(s)	2021	Plano	Sabres	2nd Place	Level 2 Senior Medium
2nd place, silver medalist(s)	2021	Plano	SassyCats	2nd Place	Level 4 Senior Medium
2nd place, silver medalist(s)	2021	Plano	SwagCats	2nd Place	Level 4 Senior Small Coed
2nd place, silver medalist(s)	2021	Charlotte	CrownCats	2nd Place	Level 4.2 Senior Medium
2nd place, silver medalist(s)	2021	Charlotte	ReignCats	2nd Place	Level 5 Senior Small Coed
2nd place, silver medalist(s)	2021	Plano	Jags	2nd Place	Level 6 Junior Large Coed
3rd place, bronze medalist(s)	2021	Plano	IceCats	3rd Place	Level 3 Junior Small
	2021	Plano	Katz	4th Place	Level 2 Junior Medium
	2021	Columbus	AlphaCats	5th Place	Level 5 Senior Large Coed
	2021	Pittsburgh	BronzeCats	6th Place	Level 3 Senior Medium
	2021	Frisco	LunaCats	6th Place	Level 3 Senior Small
	2021	Plano	Bengals	6th Place	Level 4 Junior Small
	2021	Plano	Leopards	7th Place TIE	Level 2 Junior Small
	2021	Plano	Lady Lynx	8th Place	Level 1 Junior Small
	2021	Plano	ThunderCats	8th Place	Level 4 Junior Medium
	2021	Austin	ObsidianCats	8th Place	Level 4 Senior Medium Coed
	2021	Columbus	AdonisCats	10th Place	Level 3 Junior Medium
	2021	Pittsburgh	BrassCats	12th Place	Level 4 Junior Small
	2021	Austin	EmeraldCats	13th Place TIE	Level 1 Junior Small
	2021	Pittsburgh	TitaniumCats	Semi-Finalists	Level 2 Junior Medium
	2021	Columbus	CoraCats	Semi-Finalists	Level 2 Junior Medium
	2021	Frisco	CosmicCats	Semi-Finalists	Level 2 Junior Small
	2021	Denver	Snow Leopards	Semi-Finalists	Level 5 Junior Small
	2021	Pittsburgh	ChromeCats	Semi-Finalists	Level 5 Junior Coed Small
	2021	St. Louis	Indigo Girls	Semi-Finalists	Level 5 Senior Small
	2021	Plano	Pumas	Semi-Finalists	Level 5 Senior Coed Small
1st place, gold medalist(s)	2022	Plano	Jags	1st Place	Level 6 Junior Large
1st place, gold medalist(s)	2022	Plano	FuryCats	1st Place	Level 5 Junior Large
2nd place, silver medalist(s)	2022	Charlotte	CrownCats	2nd Place	Level 4.2 Senior Small
3rd place, bronze medalist(s)	2022	Pittsburgh	ChromeCats	3rd Place	Level 5 Junior Coed Small
3rd place, bronze medalist(s)	2022	Plano	Pumas	3rd Place	Level 5 Senior Coed Small
3rd place, bronze medalist(s)	2022	Charlotte	ReignCats	3rd Place	Level 5 Senior Open Coed
3rd place, bronze medalist(s)	2022	Plano	Sassycats	3rd Place TIE	Level 4 Senior Medium
	2022	Plano	Savage6	4th Place	Level 6 Junior Coed Small
	2022	Plano	Lady Lynx	4th Place	Level 1 Junior Medium
	2022	Plano	Leopards	5th Place FINALS B	Level 2 Junior Small
	2022	Plano	Katz	5th Place	Level 2 Junior Medium
	2022	Pensacola	SplashCats	5th Place	Level 4.2 Senior Medium
	2022	Pensacola	IslandCats	6th Place	Level 1 Junior Medium
	2022	Austin	DiamondCats	6th Place	Level 5 Junior Small
	2022	Plano	Sabres	Finals	Level 2 Senior Medium
	2022	Pittsburgh	BronzeCats	8th place	Level 3 Senior Medium
	2022	Rochester	AlleyKatz	10th Place	Level 5 Junior Coed Small
	2022	Charlotte	DynastyCats	10th Place	Level 4 Junior Small
	2022	Columbus	NyxCats	10th Place	Level 4.2 Senior Small
	2022	Denver	Fre3ze Cats	10th Place FINALS B	Level 3 Junior Small
	2022	Columbus	CoraCats	11th Place TIE FINALS A	Level 2 Junior Small
	2022	Frisco	NebulaCats	12th Place FINALS A	Level 3 Junior Small
	2022	Plano	Bengals	14th Place	Level 4 Junior Small
	2022	Charlotte	PrincessCats	15th Place	Level 3 Junior Medium
	2022	Pittsburgh	GoldCats	Semi-Finalists	Level 1 Junior Medium
	2022	Rochester	StageCats	Semi-Finalists	Level 1 Junior Small
	2022	St. Louis	Jazzy Cats	Semi-Finalists	Level 2 Junior Medium
	2022	Rochester	DramaCats	Semi-Finalists	Level 2 Junior Small
	2022	Pittsburgh	TitaniumCats	Semi-Finalists	Level 2 Junior Small
	2022	Rochester	RocKatz	Semi-Finalists	Level 2 Senior Small
	2022	Pensacola	Re3fCats	Semi-Finalists	Level 3 Junior Medium
	2022	Plano	Lightning	Semi-Finalists	Level 3 Junior Medium
	2022	Rochester	Wick3d Jags	Semi-Finalists	Level 3 Junior Medium
	2022	Frisco	G-4CE Jags	Semi-Finalists	Level 4 Junior Small
	2022	Rochester	FameCats	Semi-Finalists	Level 4 Senior Small
	2022	Frisco	Sellar Scratch	Semi-Finalists	Level 4.2 Senior Small
1st place, gold medalist(s)	2023	Plano	Sassycats	1st Place	Level 4 Senior Medium
1st place, gold medalist(s)	2023	Plano	Furycats	1st Place	Level 5 Junior Large
1st place, gold medalist(s)	2023	Plano	Jags	1st Place	Level 6 Junior Large
2nd place, silver medalist(s)	2023	Pittsburgh	IronCats	2nd Place	Level 3 Senior Coed Small
2nd place, silver medalist(s)	2023	Plano	Savage6	2nd Place	Level 6 Junior Coed Small
3rd place, bronze medalist(s)	2023	Dallas	Slay Cats	3rd Place	Level 4 U18
3rd place, bronze medalist(s)	2023	St. Louis	Boogie Cats	3rd Place	Level 4 Senior Coed Small
3rd place, bronze medalist(s)	2023	Columbus	Hades	3rd Place	Level 5 Senior Open Coed
	2023	Charlotte	KnightCats	4th Place	Level 2 U18
	2023	Frisco	CosmicCats	4th Place	Level 2 Junior Small A
	2023	Plano	Bengals	4th Place	Level 4 U16
	2023	Charlotte	DynastyCats	4th Place	Level 4 Junior Medium
	2023	Frisco	GalacticCats	4th Place	Level 4 Senior Small
	2023	Charlotte	SuperiorCats	4th Place	Level 5 Junior Small
	2023	Pensacola	Cat 5	4th Place	Level 5 Senior Open Coed
	2023	Pensacola	IslandCats	5th Place	Level 1 Junior Small A
	2023	St. Louis	Tiffany Katz	5th Place TIE	Level 1 Senior Small
	2023	Columbus	PURR	5th Place	Level 1 Junior Medium
	2023	Plano	Katz	5th Place	Level 2 Junior Medium
	2023	Charlotte	DivinityCats	5th Place	Level 3 U18
	2023	Pensacola	Re3fCats	5th Place	Level 3 Junior Small B
	2023	Plano	Swagcats	5th Place	Level 4 U18 Coed
	2023	Pittsburgh	BrassCats	6th Place TIE	Level 4 Junior Small A
	2023	Plano	Thundercats	8th Place	Level 4 Junior Medium
	2023	Pittsburgh	GoldCats	9th Place	Level 1 Junior Medium
	2023	Dallas	DivaCats	9th Place	Level 3 Junior Small B
	2023	Plano	Firecats	6th Place	Level 3 Senior Small
	2023	Charlotte	EmpireC4ts	6th Place	Level 4 Senior Open Coed
	2023	Austin	Cartier	6th Place	Level 5 Senior Coed Small
	2023	Omaha	Legacy Cats	7th Place	Level 4 Senior Open Coed
	2023	Charlotte	CrownCats	7th Place	Level 4.2 Senior Small
	2023	Columbus	NyxCats	8th Place	Level 4.2 Senior Small
	2023	Austin	Slate	9th Place	Level 1 U16
	2023	Frisco	Eclipse	9th Place	Level 5 Junior Small
	2023	St. Louis	Saxy Cats	10th Place TIE	Level 3 Senior Medium
	2023	Rochester	Big City Cats	10th Place	Level 5 Senior Coed Small
	2023	Austin	Pink Panthers	11th Place	Level 3 Junior Small B
	2023	Pittsburgh	VibeCats	11th Place	Level 3 Junior Medium
	2023	Rochester	AlleyKatz	11th Place	Level 4 Junior Small A
	2023	Pittsburgh	TitaniumCats	12th Place	Level 2 Junior Small A
	2023	Dallas	VanityCats	13th Place	Level 1 Junior Small A
	2023	Columbus	CoraCats	14th Place	Level 2 Junior Small A
	2023	Columbus	AdonisCats	14th Place	Level 3 Junior Medium
	2023	Plano	Lady Lynx	Semi-Finalists	Level 1 Junior Small A
	2023	Frisco	SolarCats	Semi-Finalists	Level 1 Junior Small A
	2023	Denver	Cool Cats	Semi-Finalists	Level 1 Junior Small B
	2023	Austin	Jade	Semi-Finalists	Level 2 Junior Small A
	2023	Frisco	NebulaCats	Semi-Finalists	Level 3 Junior Medium
	2023	Plano	Icecats	Semi-Finalists	Level 3 Junior Small A
	2023	Frisco	G-4CE Jags	Semi-Finalists	Level 4 Junior Medium
	2023	Pensacola	BeaChiCats	Semi-Finalists	Level 4 Junior Medium
	2023	Columbus	HeraCats	Semi-Finalists	Level 4 Junior Medium
	2023	Denver	Ice Girls	Semi-Finalists	Level 4 Junior Small B
	2023	Frisco	Stellar Scratch	Semi-Finalists	Level 4.2 Senior Small
	2023	Denver	Black Ice	Semi-Finalists	Level 4.2 Senior Coed Small
	2023	Pensacola	SplashCats	Semi-Finalists	Level 4.2 Senior Coed Small
	2023	Pittsburgh	ChromeCats	Semi-Finalists	Level 5 Senior Small
	2023	St. Louis	Denim Cats	Premlins	Level 1 Junior Small A
	2023	Charlotte	NobleCats	Premlins	Level 1 Junior Small B
	2023	St. Louis	Jazzy Cats	Premlins	Level 2 Junior Medium
	2023	Charlotte	MajestiCats	Premlins	Level 2 Junior Medium
	2023	Pensacola	TropiCats	Premlins	Level 2 Junior Medium
	2023	Rochester	Manhattan Cats	Premlins	Level 2 Junior Medium
	2023	St. Louis	Indigo Girls	Premlins	Level 2 Senior Small
	2023	Charlotte	PrincessCats	Premlins	Level 3 Junior Medium
	2023	Austin	Jewel	Premlins	Level 3 Junior Medium
	2023	Charlotte	EmpressCats	Premlins	Level 3 Junior Small A
	2023	Rochester	Wick3d Jags	Premlins	Level 3 Junior Small A
1st place, gold medalist(s)	2024	Plano	Thundercats	1st Place	Level 4 Junior Medium
1st place, gold medalist(s)	2024	Pittsburgh	ChromeCats	1st Place	Level 5 Junior Small
1st place, gold medalist(s)	2024	Plano	Pumas	1st Place	Level 5 Senior Large
1st place, gold medalist(s)	2024	Plano	Jags	1st Place	Level 6 Junior Coed Large
2nd place, silver medalist(s)	2024	Denver	Supernovas	2nd Place	CheerABILITIES
2nd place, silver medalist(s)	2024	Plano	Leopards	2nd Place	Level 2 Junior Small A
2nd place, silver medalist(s)	2024	Plano	Furycats	2nd Place	Level 5 Junior Large
3rd place, bronze medalist(s)	2024	Columbus	HeraCats	3rd Place	Level 4 U16
3rd place, bronze medalist(s)	2024	Charlotte	Lady Prodigy	3rd Place	Level 4 U18
3rd place, bronze medalist(s)	2024	Plano	Katz	3rd Place	Level 2 Junior Medium
3rd place, bronze medalist(s)	2024	Charlotte	DivinityCats	3rd Place	Level 3 Senior Medium
	2024	Plano	Sabres	4th Place	Level 2 Senior Medium
	2024	Columbus	VenusCats	4th Place	Level 3 Senior Smal
	2024	Charlotte	CrownCats	4th Place	Level 4.2 Senior Medium
	2024	Charlotte	SuperiorCats	4th Place	Level 5 Junior Small
	2024	Frisco	Coed Eclipse	4th Place	Level 5 Junior Coed Small
	2024	Denver	Ice 4	5th Place	Level 4 Junior Medium
	2024	Austin	Black Pearl	5th Place	Level 4.2 Senior Coed Small
	2024	Charlotte	ReignCats	5th Place	Level 5 Senior Coed Medium
	2024	Denver	Chill Cats	6th Place	Level 1 U16
	2024	Plano	Bengals	6th Place	Level 4 U16
	2024	Plano	Fang4	6th Place	Level 4 U16 Coed
	2024	Denver	Cool Cats	6th Place	Level 1 Junior Medium
	2024	Pittsburgh	BrassCats	7th Place	Level 4 U16 Coed
	2024	Charlotte	DynastyCats	7th Place	Level 4 Junior Medium
	2024	Rockwall	Karma	8th Place	Level 3 Junior Small B
	2024	Frisco	LunaCats	8th Place	Level 3 Senior Medium
	2024	Plano	Firecats	8th Place	Level 3 Senior Coed Medium
	2024	St. Louis	ClassiCats	8th Place	Level 4 Senior Small
	2024	Frisco	Lady Eclipse	8th Place	Level 5 Senior Small
	2024	Frisco	GalaxyCats	10th Place	Level 3 U16
	2024	Dallas	Small Junior Scratch	10th Place	Level 3 Junior Small B
	2024	Columbus	HypnoaCats	10th Place	Level 3 Senior Medium
	2024	Denver	Ice Queens	10th Place	Level 4.2 Senior Small
	2024	Austin	Pink Panther	11th Place	Level 3 Junior Small B
	2024	Charlotte	NobleCats	12th Place TIE	Level 1 Junior Small B
	2024	Dallas	Crystal Claw	12th Place	Level 2 Junior Small A
	2024	Charlotte	KnightCats	12th Place	Level 2 Senior Small
	2024	Plano	Sassycats	12th Place	Level 4 Senior Medium
	2024	Columbus	AdonisCats	13th Place	Level 3 Junior Medium
	2024	Charlotte	ImperialCats	13th Place	Level 3 Junior Small A
	2024	Rochester	Claw 5	13th Place	Level 5 Senior Coed Small
	2024	Charlotte	Queen of Hearts	14th Place	Level 1 Senior Small
	2024	St. Louis	Miss Harmony	15th Place	Level 3 Junior Small B
	2024	Charlotte	PrincessCats	16th Place	Level 3 U16
	2024	Columbus	CoraCats	16th Place	Level 2 Junior Medium
	2024	Charlotte	MajestiCats	17th Place	Level 2 Junior Medium
	2024	Frisco	Lightyear	Semi-Finalists	Level 1 U16
	2024	Denver	Frost Cats	Semi-Finalists	Level 2 U16
	2024	Plano	Crystalcats	Semi-Finalists	Level 3 U16
	2024	Denver	Shiv3r	Semi-Finalists	Level 3 U16
	2024	Denver	Frozen 4	Semi-Finalists	Level 4 U16
	2024	Austin	Cartier	Semi-Finalists	Level 4 U16 Coed
	2024	Plano	Lady Lynx	Semi-Finalists	Level 1 Junior Medium
	2024	Frisco	SolarCats	Semi-Finalists	Level 1 Junior Small A
	2024	St. Louis	Denim Cats	Semi-Finalists	Level 1 Junior Small B
	2024	Rochester	SoHo Sabres	Semi-Finalists	Level 1 Senior Small
	2024	Frisco	CosmicCats	Semi-Finalists	Level 2 Junior Medium
	2024	St. Louis	Jazzy Cats	Semi-Finalists	Level 2 Junior Medium
	2024	Denver	Arctic Cats	Semi-Finalists	Level 2 Junior Small A
	2024	Rochester	Fifth Ave Felines	Semi-Finalists	Level 2 Junior Small B
	2024	St. Louis	Indigo Girls	Semi-Finalists	Level 2 Senior Small
	2024	Denver	Fre3ze Cats	Semi-Finalists	Level 3 Junior Medium
	2024	Plano	Icecats	Semi-Finalists	Level 3 Junior Medium
	2024	Rochester	Wick3d Jags	Semi-Finalists	Level 3 Junior Small B
	2024	Denver	Whit3 Out	Semi-Finalists	Level 3 Senior Small
	2024	Frisco	G-4ce Jags	Semi-Finalists	Level 4 Junior Medium
	2024	Dallas	Small Senior Scratch	Semi-Finalists	Level 4 Senior Coed Small
	2024	Columbus	AlphaCats	Semi-Finalists	Level 5 Senior Coed Medium
	2024	St. Louis	Blue Crew	Semi-Finalists	Level 5 Senior Coed Small
	2024	Denver	Slick	Semi-Finalists	Level 5 Senior Coed Small
	2024	Pittsburgh	GoldCats	Premlins	Level 1 Junior Small A
	2024	Columbus	PURR	Premlins	Level 1 Junior Small B
	2024	Austin	Slate	Premlins	Level 1 Junior Small B
	2024	Pittsburgh	TitaniumCats	Premlins	Level 2 Junior Medium
	2024	Austin	2 Carat	Premlins	Level 2 Junior Medium
	2024	Frisco	NebulaCats	Premlins	Level 3 Junior Small A
	2024	St. Louis	Saxy Cats	Premlins	Level 3 Senior Small
	2024	Pittsburgh	IronCats	Premlins	Level 3 Senior Coed Small
	2024	Columbus	ApolloCats	Premlins	Level 4 Senior Coed Small
	2024	Rochester	Street C4ts	Premlins	Level 4 Senior Coed Small
1st place, gold medalist(s)	2025	Plano	Furycats	1st Place	Level 5 Junior Large
2nd place, silver medalist(s)	2025	Plano	Sassycats	2nd Place	Level 4 Senior Medium
2nd place, silver medalist(s)	2025	Plano	Pumas	2nd Place	Level 5 Senior Large
2nd place, silver medalist(s)	2025	Charlotte	ReignCats	2nd Place	Level 5 Senior Medium
2nd place, silver medalist(s)	2025	Plano	Jags	2nd Place	Level 6 Junior Coed Large
3rd place, bronze medalist(s)	2025	Columbus	NyxCats	3rd Place	Level 4.2 Senior Small
3rd place, bronze medalist(s)	2025	Denver	Crush	3rd Place	Level 5 Junior Small
3rd place, bronze medalist(s)	2025	Columbus	AthenaCats	3rd Place	Level 5 Senior Medium
	2025	Plano	Vixens	4th Place	Level 5 Senior Medium
	2025	Plano	Sabres	5th Place	Level 2 Senior Medium
	2025	Dallas	DivaCats	5th Place	Level 3 Junior Small A
	2025	Plano	Thundercats	5th Place	Level 4 Junior Medium
	2025	Plano	Tigers	5th Place	Level 4 Senior Small
	2025	Plano	Savagecats	5th Place	Level 4.2 Senior Medium
	2025	Dallas	SSS	5th Place	Level 5 Senior Coed Small
	2025	Plano	Firecats	6th Place	Level 3 Senior Coed Medium
	2025	St. Louis	Soul Sisters	6th Place	Level 4 Junior Medium
	2025	Charlotte	CrownCats	6th Place	Level 4.2 Senior Medium
	2025	Denver	Cool Cats	7th Place	Level 1 Junior Medium
	2025	Austin	2 Carat	7th Place	Level 2 Junior Medium
	2025	Charlotte	DivinityCats	7th Place	Level 3 Senior Small
	2025	Austin	Cartier	7th Place	Level 4 Senior Coed Small
	2025	Frisco	Eclipse	7th Place	Level 5 Senior Coed Medium
	2025	St. Louis	Miss Melody	8th Place	Level 3 Senior Medium
	2025	Plano	Pro1ers	11th Place	Level 1 Senior Small
	2025	Plano	Katz	11th Place	Level 2 Junior Medium
	2025	Rockwall	Serendipity	11th Place	Level 2 Junior Small B
	2025	Austin	Onyx	11th Place	Level 5 Senior Coed Small
	2025	Pittsburgh	Glamour Cats	12th Place	Level 2 Junior Medium
	2025	Pittsburgh	TitaniumCats	15th Place	Level 2 Junior Small A
	2025	Pittsburgh	VibraniumCats	16th Place	Level 3 Junior Small A
	2025	Frisco	SolarCats	Semi-Finalists	Level 1 Junior Small
	2025	Denver	Chill Cats	Semi-Finalists	Level 1 Junior Small
	2025	St. Louis	Denim Catz	Semi-Finalists	Level 1 Junior Small
	2025	Emerald Coast	Bay Benga1s	Semi-Finalists	Level 1 Junior Small
	2025	Plano	Lady Lynx	Semi-Finalists	Level 1 Junior Small
	2025	Denver	Frost Cats	Semi-Finalists	Level 2 Junior Small A
	2025	Dallas	Atti2de	Semi-Finalists	Level 2 Junior Small A
	2025	St. Louis	Jazzy Cats	Semi-Finalists	Level 2 Junior Small B
	2025	Frisco	NebulaCats	Semi-Finalists	Level 3 Junior Medium
	2025	Plano	Icecats	Semi-Finalists	Level 3 Junior Medium
	2025	Emerald Coast	Re3f Cats	Semi-Finalists	Level 3 Junior Medium
	2025	Coloumbus	AdonisCats	Semi-Finalists	Level 3 Junior Small A
	2025	Denver	Shiv3r	Semi-Finalists	Level 3 Junior Small B
	2025	St. Louis	Miss Harmony	Semi-Finalists	Level 3 Junior Small B
	2025	Charlotte	DynastyCats	Semi-Finalists	Level 4 Junior Medium
	2025	Columbus	HeraCats	Semi-Finalists	Level 4 Junior Medium
	2025	Dallas	Junior Couture	Semi-Finalists	Level 4 Junior Small
	2025	St. Louis	ClassiCats	Semi-Finalists	Level 4 Senior Small
	2025	Denver	Ice Queens	Semi-Finalists	Level 4.2 Senior Small
	2025	Frisco	Stellar Scratch	Semi-Finalists	Level 4.2 Senior Small
	2025	Emerald Coast	Shady Cats	Semi-Finalists	Level 4.2 Senior Coed Small
	2025	Austin	Black Pearl	Semi-Finalists	Level 4.2 Senior Coed Small
	2025	Pittsburgh	ChromeCats	Semi-Finalists	Level 5 Junior Small
	2025	Emerald Coast	Cat5	Semi-Finalists	Level 5 Senior Coed Small
	2025	Rochester	Voltage	Premlins	Level 1 Junior Small
	2025	Rochester	Black Widow	Premlins	Level 2 Senior Small
	2025	Rochester	Avengers	Premlins	Level 4 Junior Small
	2025	Pittsburgh	BrassCats	Premlins	Level 4 U16 Coed
	2025	Charlotte	SuperiorCats	Premlins	Level 5 Junior Coed Small
	2025	Rochester	Venom	Premlins	Level 5 Senior Coed Small
1st place, gold medalist(s)	2026	Emerald Coast	BeachiCats	1st Place	Level 5 Senior Open Coed
2nd place, silver medalist(s)	2026	Plano	Firecats	2nd Place	Level 3 Senior Coed Medium
2nd place, silver medalist(s)	2026	Denver	Ice 4	2nd Place	Level 4 Junior Medium
2nd place, silver medalist(s)	2026	Plano	Furycats	2nd Place	Level 5 Junior Small
2nd place, silver medalist(s)	2026	Charlotte	ReignCats	2nd Place	Level 5 Senior Large
3rd place, bronze medalist(s)	2026	Plano	Vixens	3rd Place	Level 5 Senior Medium
3rd place, bronze medalist(s)	2026	Plano	Pumas	3rd Place	Level 5 Senior Coed Large
3rd place, bronze medalist(s)	2026	Plano	Jags	3rd Place	Level 6 Junior Large
3rd place, bronze medalist(s)	2026	Denver	Fre3ze	3rd Place	L3 U16 Large
3rd place, bronze medalist(s)	2026	Charlotte	Lady Prodigy	3rd Place	L4 U18 Large
3rd place, bronze medalist(s)	2026	Dallas	Scarlet Scratch	3rd Place	L4 U18 Coed Small
	2026	Charlotte	KingdomCats	4th Place	Level 1 Junior Flex Small
	2026	Austin	2 Carat Cadets	4th Place`	Level 2 Junior Flex Medium
	2026	Denver	Hail	4th Place	L2 U18 Small
	2026	Denver	Cool	5th Place	Level 1 Junior Flex Small
	2026	St. Louis	Miss Harmony	5th Place	Level 3 Junior Flex Small
	2026	Plano	Thundercats	5th Place	Level 4 Junior Medium
	2026	Plano	Sassycats	5th Place	Level 4 Senior Medium
	2026	Austin	Cartier	5th Place	Level 4 Senior Coed Small
	2026	Plano	Tigers	5th Place	L4 U18 Large
	2026	Charlotte	CrownCats	6th Place	Level 4.2 Senior Small
	2026	Philadelphia	Neon Cats	6th Place	Level 5 Junior Small
	2026	Plano	Lady Lynx	7th Place	Level 1 Junior Flex Small
	2026	Emerald Coast	4CAsT	7th Place (TIE)	Level 4 Junior Flex Small
	2026	Rockwall	Jinx	7th Place (TIE)	Level 4 Junior Flex Small
	2026	Emerald Coast	Splash Cats	7th Place	L2 U16 Large
	2026	Rockwall	Serendipity	8th Place (TIE)	Level 2 Junior Flex Small
	2026	Denver	Crush	8th Place	Level 5 Junior Coed Small
	2026	Austin	3 Carat Gossip Girls	8th Place	L3 U16 Small
	2026	Plano	Katz	9th Place	Level 2 Junior Medium
	2026	St. Louis	Indigo Girls	9th Place	Level 2 Senior Small
	2026	Charlotte	DynastyCats	9th Place	Level 4 Junior Flex Medium
	2026	Charlotte	PrincessCats	9th Place	L3 U16 Small
	2026	Rochester	AlleyKatz	10th Place	Level 3 Senior Coed Small
	2026	Philadelphia	Bling Cats	10th Place	Level 4 Junior Flex Small
	2026	Frisco	G-4ce	10th Place	Level 4 Junior Small
	2026	Rochester	Empire Cats	10th Place	L1 U16 Small
	2026	St. Louis	BoogieCats	11th Place	Level 5 Senior Coed Small
	2026	Columbus	HypnosCats	11th Place	L3 U16 Small
	2026	Emerald Coast	Cat 5	15th Place	Level 5 Senior Coed Small
	2026	Frisco	SolarCats	Semi-Finalists	Level 1 Junior Flex Small
	2026	Emerald Coast	Bay Benga1s	Semi-Finalists	Level 1 Junior Small
	2026	St. Louis	Denim Catz	Semi-Finalists	Level 1 Junior Small
	2026	Denver	Frost	Semi-Finalists	Level 2 Junior Flex Medium
	2026	Columbus	CoraCats	Semi-Finalists	Level 2 Junior Flex Medium
	2026	Chicago	Ignite	Semi-Finalists	Level 2 Junior Flex Small
	2026	Dallas	Scratch Queens	Semi-Finalists	Level 2 Junior Flex Small
	2026	St. Louis	Jazzy Cats	Semi-Finalists	Level 2 Junior Small
	2026	Philadelphia	Glamour Cats	Semi-Finalists	Level 2 Junior Small
	2026	Omaha	IconicCAts	Semi-Finalists	Level 2 Junior Small
	2026	Charlotte	KnightCats	Semi-Finalists	Level 2 Senior Small
	2026	Frisco	GalaxyCats	Semi-Finalists	L3 U16 Large
	2026	Chicago	Blue Heat	Semi-Finalists	Level 3 Junior Flex Medium
	2026	Rockwall	Karma	Semi-Finalists	Level 3 Junior Small
	2026	Emerald Coast	Lady Leopards	Semi-Finalists	Level 3 Senior Small
	2026	Denver	Ice Girls	Semi-Finalists	L4 U18 Small
	2026	Pittsburgh	Lithiumcats	Semi-Finalists	Level 4 Junior Flex Medium
	2026	St. Louis	Soul Sisters	Semi-Finalists	Level 4 Junior Flex Small
	2026	Columbus	HeraCats	Semi-Finalists	Level 4 Junior Flex Small
	2026	Chicago	Pyro	Semi-Finalists	Level 4 Junior Flex Small
	2026	Omaha	SupremeCAts	Semi-Finalists	Level 4 Senior Small
	2026	Frisco	Infinity	Semi-Finalists	Level 4 Senior Coed Small
	2026	Plano	Savagecats	Semi-Finalists	Level 4.2 Senior Medium
	2026	St. Louis	Miss Fourté	Semi-Finalists	Level 4.2 Senior Small
	2026	Denver	Winter Soldiers	Semi-Finalists	Level 4.2 Senior Coed Medium
	2026	Columbus	NyxCats	Semi-Finalists	Level 4.2 Senior Coed Small
	2026	Chicago	Carbon	Semi-Finalists	Level 4.2 Senior Coed Small
	2026	Chicago	Inferno	Semi-Finalists	Level 5 Junior Coed Small
	2026	Columbus	AthenaCats	Semi-Finalists	Level 5 Senior Medium
	2026	Columbus	ZeusCats	Semi-Finalists	Level 5 Senior Small
	2026	Omaha	Lady Dynasty	Semi-Finalists	Level 5 Senior Small
	2026	Chicago	Instinct	Semi-Finalists	Level 5 Senior Coed Small
	2026	Dallas	Small Senior Scratch	Semi-Finalists	Level 5 Senior Coed Small
	2026	Rochester	Manhattan Cats	Premlins	Level 2 Junior Flex Small
	2026	Plano	Leopards	Premlins	Level 2 Junior Small
	2026	Chicago	Phoenix	Premlins	Level 2 Junior Small
	2026	Plano	Miss Fang	Premlins	Level 3 Junior Flex Small
	2026	Charlotte	ClassyCats	Premlins	Level 3 Junior Flex Small
	2026	Lexington	Trifecta	Premlins	Level 3 Junior Small
	2026	Plano	Icecats	Premlins	Level 3 Junior Small
	2026	Charlotte	DivinityCats	Premlins	Level 3 Senior Medium
	2026	Buffalo	Bandit Cats	Premlins	Level 3 Senior Small
	2026	Dallas	Junior Couture	Premlins	Level 4 Junior Small
	2026	Chicago	Lady Blaze	Premlins	Level 4 Senior Medium
	2026	Lexington	Superfecta	Premlins	Level 4 Senior Coed Small
	2026	Pittsburgh	Ironcats	Premlins	Level 4.2 Senior Small
	2026	Lexington	Alysheba Cats	Premlins	Level 5 Junior Small
	2026	Lexington	Pharoah Cats	Premlins	Level 5 Senior Small
	2026	Frisco	Eclipse	Premlins	Level 5 Senior Coed Small

=== Youth Summit Results ===
	Year	Location	Team	Place	Division
1st place, gold medalist(s)	2023	Columbus	KleioCats	1st Place	Level 3 Youth Small
3rd place, bronze medalist(s)	2023	Pensacola	SunnY3	3rd Place	Level 3 Youth Medium
	2023	Columbus	SirenCats	4th Place	Level 1 Youth Small
	2023	Columbus	AuroraCats	11th Place	Level 2 Youth Small
	2024	Rockwall	Jackpot	7th Place	Level 1 Youth Small
	2024	Columbus	SirenCats	28th Place	Level 1 Youth Small
	2025	Frisco	MeteorCats	4th Place	Level 1 Youth Medium
	2025	Rockwall	Jackpot	8th Place	Level 1 Youth Small B
	2025	Columbus	AuroraCats	8th Place	Level 2 Youth Medium
	2025	Frisco	NovaCats	10th Place	Level 3 Youth Small
	2025	Frisco	AstroCats	11th Place	Level 2 Youth Medium
	2025	Columbus	SirenCats	16th Place	Level 1 Youth Medium
	2025	Rockwall	Radiance	17th Place	Level 2 Youth Small
	2025	Frisco	Moonlight	19th Place	Level 2 Youth Small
	2025	Emerald Coast	Pearl Cats	Prelims	Level 1 Youth Small A
	2025	Austin	Pink Sapphire	Prelims	Level 1 Youth Medium WC
	2025	Emerald Coast	WavyKats	Prelims	Level 2 Youth Medium

=== The All Star World Championships Results ===
	Year	Location	Team	Place	Division
2nd place, silver medalist(s)	2021	Frisco	MoonlightCats	2nd Place	Level 2 Youth
2nd place, silver medalist(s)	2021	Frisco	NovaCats	2nd Place	Level 3 Youth
3rd place, bronze medalist(s)	2021	Frisco	Astro Cats	3rd Place TIE	Level 2 Youth
	2021	Denver	Fre3ze Cats	5th Place TIE	Level 3 Junior
	2021	Denver	Blizzard Cats	8th Place	Level 1 Junior
	2021	Denver	Arctic Cats	8th Place	Level 2 Junior
	2021	Denver	Tundra Cats	9th Place	Level 2 Senior
	2021	Denver	ICEolots	13th Place	Level 2 Youth
	2021	Denver	Yet1 Cats	Semi-Finalists	Level 1 Youth B
1st place, gold medalist(s)	2022	Frisco	AstroCats	1st Place	Level 2 Youth Medium
2nd place, silver medalist(s)	2022	Pensacola	Surf City Kitties	2nd Place	Level 1 Mini Medium
3rd place, bronze medalist(s)	2022	Frisco	StarDust	3rd Place	Level 2 Mini
	2022	Pensacola	SunnY3	5th Place TIE	Level 3 Youth Small
	2022	Austin	Sapphire Cats	5th Place TIE	Level 3 Youth Small
	2022	Austin	Pink Ice	6th Place	Level 1 Youth Small
	2022	Pensacola	WavYKats	6th Place	Level 2 Youth Medium
	2022	Charlotte	Royal Court	8th Place	Level 3 Youth Small
	2022	Austin	Jet Cats	10th Place	Level 1 Mini Small
	2022	Rochester	Broadway Cats	10th Place	Level 2 Youth Small
	2022	Frisco	MeteorCats	11th Place	Level 1 Youth Small
	2022	Denver	Yet1 Cats	14th Place	Level 1 Youth Small
	2022	Denver	Snowball Cats	16th Place	Level 1 Mini Small
	2022	Charlotte	AristoCats	20th Place	Level 1 Youth Small
	2022	Austin	Topaz Cats	21st Place	Level 2 Youth Small
	2022	Charlotte	EnchantedCats	23rd Place	Level 2 Youth Small
	2022	Rochester	Taxi Cats	26th Place	Level 1 Youth Small
	2022	Omaha	CourageCats	35th Place	Level 1 Youth Small
	2022	St. Louis	RiffCats	45th Place	Level 1 Youth Small
	2022	Frisco	NovaCats	Semi-Finalists	Level 3 Youth Small B
2nd place, silver medalist(s)	2023	Pensacola	SunnY3	2nd Place	Level 3 Youth Medium
3rd place, bronze medalist(s)	2023	Frisco	Meteorites	3rd Place	Level 1 Mini Medium
3rd place, bronze medalist(s)	2023	Frisco	AstroCats	3rd Place	Level 2 Youth Small B
3rd place, bronze medalist(s)	2023	Omaha	Iconic Cats	3rd Place	Level 2 Junior XSmall B
	2023	Frisco	MeteorCats	4th Place	Level 1 Youth XSmall E
	2023	Frisco	NovaCats	4th Place	Level 3 Youth Small
	2023	Pensacola	WavyKats	5th Place	Level 2 Youth Medium B
	2023	Austin	Topaz	6th Place	Level 2 Youth XSmall B
	2023	Pensacola	Surf City Kitties	7th Place	Level 1 Mini Small
	2023	Pensacola	Gulf Girls	7th Place	Level 1 Youth Medium B
	2023	Omaha	Courage Cats	9th Place	Level 1 Youth Small C
	2023	Austin	Pink Ice	16th Place	Level 1 Youth Small A
	2023	Omaha	Glory Cats	Semi-Finalists	Level 3 Senior XSmall A
	2023	Frisco	Stardust	Semi-Finalists	Level 2 Mini XSmall
2024 Omaha Supreme Cats 1st Place Senior coed xsmall 4
2nd place, silver medalist(s)	2025	Omaha	LegacyCAts	2nd Place	International Level 5 Open Coed Small
	2025	Omaha	PowerCAts	6th Place	Level 1 Junior XSmall
	2025	Omaha	SavvyCAts	6th Place	Level 4.2 Junior XSmall
	2025	Omaha	BraveCAts	7th Place	Level 2 Youth Small
	2025	Omaha	Boss Babies	9th Place	Level 1 Mini Small
	2025	Omaha	CourageCAts	21st Place	Level 1 Youth Small
	2025	Omaha	IconicCAts	Prelims	Level 2 Junior Small A
	2025	Omaha	SupremeCAts	Prelims	Level 4 Senior XSmall B

== Controversy ==
In September 2020, Jerry Harris, an American cheerleader featured on the Netflix documentary series Cheer, was arrested on suspicion of sexual misconduct and child pornography. Cheer Athletics founder Angela Rogers is accused in a lawsuit alongside multiple other entities of tipping off Harris to an investigation by the FBI and negligence surrounding their handling of allegations of Harris' behavior that could have prevented the sexual misconduct and protected students and participants.

Cheer Athletics and Angela Rogers have come under further scrutiny following the uncovering of several public contacts made between Harris and Rogers in May 2020 after Rogers had claimed that she and Cheer Athletics had ceased involvement with Harris as of March 1, 2020. In July 2020, Cheer Athletics posted a photo of Harris to their Instagram account celebrating six Emmy Nominations for the Cheer series. The matter is still pending in court and Rogers maintains a stance of uninvolvement.
