= Guralnick =

Guralnik or Guralnick is a surname. Notable people with the surname include:

- Gerald Guralnik (1936–2014), American physicist
- Orna Guralnik (born 1964), American-Israeli psychologist
- Peter Guralnick (born 1943), American music critic, author, and screenwriter
- Robert Guralnick (born 1950), American mathematician
- Walter Guralnick (1916–2017), American dentist

== See also ==
- Tiago Geralnik (born 2003), Argentine footballer
