= Lexi Brumback =

American cheerleader

- Born: January 11, 2000 (age 26)
- Education: Navarro College
- Occupation: Television personality

Lexis “Lexi” Marie Brumback (born January 11, 2000) is an American cheerleader and television personality. She received national recognition after appearing in the Netflix docuseries Cheer. She is known for being a tumbler with elite tumbling skills.

== Personal life ==
Brumback is originally from Houston, Texas. She attended Navarro College in Corsicana, Texas, where she was a member of the cheer team coached by Monica Aldama. She admitted to making poor choices growing up, landing her in trouble after she "spent a night in jail after getting into a fight." During the finale of Cheer, it was revealed that she was kicked off of the team when she got into trouble after being pulled over in a car containing "illegal stuff." She has since rejoined the team. In January 2020, she appeared on The Ellen DeGeneres Show, along with other members of the team.
