= Couples therapy (disambiguation) =

Couples therapy are relationship interventions aimed at enhancing intimate relationships, resolving interpersonal conflicts and rehabilitating broken bonds of love.

Couples therapy may also refer to:

- Couples Therapy (2012 TV series), an American reality television show on VH1
- Couples Therapy (2019 TV series), an American television show on Showtime
