= Celebrity Show-Off =

American reality competition show

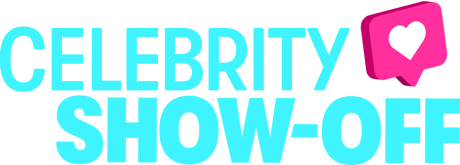
- Genre: Reality competition
- Based on: My Little Television by Munhwa Broadcasting Corporation
- Developed by: Craig Plestis
- Presented by: Mayim Bialik
- Country of origin: United States
- Original language: English
- No. of seasons: 1
- No. of episodes: 9

Production
- Executive producers: Craig Plestis; Tom Forman; Jenny Daly; Jon Beyer; Aliyah Silverstein
- Running time: 42 minutes
- Production company: Critical Content

Original release
- Network: TBS
- Release: June 23 – August 18, 2020

Celebrity Show-Off is an American reality competition television series that premiered on TBS on June 23, 2020. The remotely-produced program—which was hosted by Mayim Bialik and based on the South Korean show My Little Television—featured five celebrities per episode competing to create popular original content. Each celebrity's "digital show" was uploaded to TBS' YouTube channel the day after each episode aired and later received a score based on its viewership, view duration, and engagement performance. After they reacted to each other's videos in a virtual studio, the celebrity with the lowest-performing was eliminated, and a new competitor would be introduced.

Diplo, Ja Rule, Action Bronson, Gabi Butler, Dwight Howard, Travis Kelce, NeNe Leakes, Jason Mraz, Kevin Smith, Tori Spelling, Bella Thorne, Rumer Willis, Scout Willis, and Tallulah Willis were among the celebrities competing. As each remained in the competition, the amount of money they raised for the charity of their choice increased, and the winner received an additional amount to donate.

== Season 1 (2020) ==
=== Renewation Chart ===
Color key:

The celebrity was declared the winner.
The celebrity was declared the runner-up.
The celebrity was declared third place.
The celebrity was safe from their Renewation.
The celebrity was not Renewed from their Renewation.
The celebrity did not appear.

Celebrity	Occupation	Episodes								
Celebrity	Occupation	1	2	3	4	5	6	7	8	9
Tori Spelling	TV Actress		Safe	Safe	Safe	Safe	Safe	Safe	Safe	Winner
Kevin Smith	Filmmaker	Safe	Safe	Safe	Safe	Safe	Safe	Safe	Safe	Runner-Up
Jason Mraz	Singer	Safe	Safe	Safe	Safe	Safe	Safe	Safe	Safe	Third Place
Adam Rippon	Figure Skater							Safe	OUT	
Gabi Butler	Cheerleader						Safe	OUT		
NeNe Leakes	TV Personality				Safe	Safe	OUT			
Travis Kelce	Football Tight End					OUT				
Ja Rule	Rapper	Safe	Safe	Safe	OUT					
Diplo	DJ			OUT						
Bella Thorne	Actress	Safe	OUT							
The Willis Sisters	TV Actresses	OUT								

==== Episode 1 (23 June 2020) ====
Cast	Title	Result
Ja Rule	Ja Rule Gyro Commercial	Advanced
Rumer Willis; Scout Willis and Tallulah Willis	The Willis Factor	OUT
Jason Mraz	Jason Mraz: Mragical Mranch	Advanced
Bella Thorne	Bella Thorne Ghosted	Advanced
Kevin Smith	Kevin Smith: Son-In-LockDown Episode 1	Advanced

==== Episode 2 (30 June 2020) ====
Cast	Title	Result
Kevin Smith	Kevin Smith: Son-In-LockDown Episode 2	Advanced
Jason Mraz	Mragical Mranch: Not Kitten Around	Advanced
Ja Rule	Ja Rule DeFeats The Internet	Advanced
Tori Spelling	Tori Spelling Holy Matorimony	Advanced
Bella Thorne	Bella Thorne High Art	OUT

==== Episode 3 (7 July 2020) ====
Cast	Title	Result
Kevin Smith	Kevin Smith: Son-In-LockDown Episode 3	Advanced
Tori Spelling	Tori's Surprise Pride Party	Advanced
Diplo	Diplo Dip Thoughts	OUT
Jason Mraz	Mragical Mranch: Waste Mranagement	Advanced
Ja Rule	Ja Rules Of Love	Advanced

==== Episode 4 (14 July 2020) ====
Cast	Title	Result
Kevin Smith	Kevin Smith: Son-In-LockDown Episode 4	Advanced
Tori Spelling	Tori's: My Birthday In Quarantori	Advanced
Jason Mraz	Mragical Mranch: Coffee BreakDown	Advanced
Ja Rule	Ja Rule's BarnYard	OUT
Nene Leakes	Drive-Through Advice with Nene Leaks	Advanced

==== Episode 5 (21 July 2020) ====
Cast	Title	Result
Travis Kelce	ManScaping With Travis Kelce	OUT
Nene Leakes	Nene TV	Advanced
Jason Mraz	Mragical Mranch: A Tricky Situation	Advanced
Kevin Smith	Kevin Smith: Son-In-LockDown Episode 5	Advanced
Tori Spelling	Tori's Drive-Thru Party Factori	Advanced

==== Episode 6 (28 July 2020) ====
Cast	Title	Result
Gabi Butler	Best Butler	Advanced
Nene Leakes	Nene Speaks! With Nene Leakes	OUT
Jason Mraz	Mragical Mranch: Fan Mail FlashBack	Advanced
Kevin Smith	Kevin Smith: Son-In-LockDown Episode 6	Advanced
Tori Spelling	Scary S-Tori-es	Advanced

==== Episode 7 (4 August 2020) ====
Cast	Title	Result
Gabi Butler	Best Butler: Chef Du Soleil	OUT
Adam Rippon	Welcome To The Neighborhood: A Tiny Problem	Advanced
Jason Mraz	Mragical Mranch: Twisted & Toasted	Advanced
Kevin Smith	Kevin Smith: Son-In-LockDown Episode 7	Advanced
Tori Spelling	Beverly Hills 9021-OZ	Advanced

==== Episode 8 (11 August 2020) ====
Cast	Title	Result
Adam Rippon	Welcome To The Neighborhood: A Horse With No Fame	OUT
Jason Mraz	Mragical Mranch: Stuck In A Musical	Advanced
Kevin Smith	Kevin Smith: Son-In-LockDown Episode 8	Advanced
Tori Spelling	Love S-Tori-Es	Advanced

==== Episode 9 (18 August 2020) ====
Cast	Title	Result
Jason Mraz	Mragical Mranch: The Quest For Perfection	Third Place
Kevin Smith	Kevin Smith: Son-In-LockDown Episode 9	Runner-Up
Tori Spelling	No-Tori-Ous S-Tori-Es	Winner

== Viewership and ratings ==
Viewership and ratings per episode of Celebrity Show-Off
No.	Title	Air date	Rating (18–49)	Viewers (millions)
1	"Meet the Show-Offs"	June 23, 2020	0.2	0.52
2	"The STori Continues"	June 30, 2020	0.2	0.49
3	"Diplo, Aim High"	July 7, 2020	0.2	0.53
4	"NeNe Leakes Is Here, Baby"	July 14, 2020	0.2	0.47
5	"Travis Kelce Touches Down"	July 21, 2020	TBD	TBD
6	"Gabi Brings It On!"	July 28, 2020	TBD	TBD
7	"A Rippon-Roaring Good Time"	August 4, 2020	TBD	TBD
8	"The Show-Off Semi-Finals"	August 11, 2020	TBD	TBD
9	"Best In Show-Off"	August 18, 2020	TBD	TBD
