= Gabi Butler =

American cheerleader, YouTuber, television personality, and professional wrestler

- Born: January 16, 1998 (age 28)
- Education: Navarro College; Weber State University
- Occupations: Cheerleader; television personality; YouTuber; professional wrestler
- Known for: Cheerleading

Gabriella "Gabi" Butler (born January 16, 1998) is an American cheerleader, YouTuber, television personality, and ex-professional wrestler who was signed to WWE. She received national recognition after appearing in the Netflix docuseries Cheer and had been on many teams before her appearance in the Netflix show, such as the California All Stars Smoed, Top Gun TGLC, Cheer Athletics Wildcats, and Gymtyme Blink. She is most recently a member of the Weber State University and the Navarro College cheer teams. In the 2025-26 season she has been cheering with the team Top Gun Allstars Double O.

Gabi Butler has been doing competitive cheerleading since she was eight years old and is known for her flexibility and her great talent in flying. She appeared regularly on AwesomenessTV's YouTube series Cheerleaders for a couple of seasons when she was on the California All Stars team Smoed (a portmanteau of "small" and "coed") between 2012 and 2014 and occasionally appeared on a few episodes of later seasons. She has won the cheerleading world championships 3 times, in 2013 and 2014 with Smoed and in 2026 with the Top Gun Allstars Double O. In January 2020, she appeared on The Ellen DeGeneres Show, along with other members of the Navarro College cheer team. She also has a YouTube channel, which gives viewers a behind the scenes look into her cheer life. in 2021, she attended Weber State University in Ogden, Utah, where she was a member of the cheer squad. Now (2026) she has graduated college and has been with the ProCheer League team Miami Metal.

== Professional wrestling career ==
=== WWE (2022–present) ===
In November 2022 it was reported that Butler had signed a contract with WWE and would begin training at the WWE Performance Center.

== Television ==
Year	Title	Notes
2012	Secret Diary of an American Cheerleader	1 episode
2020–2022	Cheer	Starring; 15 episodes
2025	Battle Camp	3rd eliminated; 4 episodes
