= Nuar Alsadir =

American poet

Nuar Alsadir (born in New Haven, Connecticut) is an American poet and psychoanalyst. She was a finalist for the 2017 National Book Critics Circle Award for Poetry, and was shortlisted for the 2017 Forward Prize for Poetry. Animal Joy, her nonfiction debut, was a TIME Magazine Must-Read Book of 2022 and a Publishers Weekly Best Book of 2022.

Her work has appeared in The Paris Review, The New York Times Magazine, LitHub, The Yale Review, and Granta. Her essay, "On Boredom," originally published in Granta, was selected for inclusion in 'The Best American Essays 2025' edited by Jia Tolentino. She was interviewed by Cathy Park Hong in BOMB Magazine.

She has also appeared as part of the peer advisory group on Couples Therapy.

== Works ==
- More Shadow Than Bird (Salt Publishing, 2012).
- Fourth Person Singular (Liverpool University Press, 2017)
- Animal Joy, (Graywolf Press/ FItzcarraldo Editions, 2022) ISBN 978-1-64445-093-2
