= La'Darius Marshall =

American cheerleader (born 1998)

- Born: May 9, 1998 (age 28)
- Education: Navarro College
- Occupation: Television personality

La'Darius Marshall (born May 9, 1998) is an American cheerleader and television personality. He received national recognition after appearing in the Netflix docuseries Cheer.

== Personal life ==
Marshall is originally from Fort Walton Beach, Florida. He attended Navarro College in Corsicana, Texas, where he was member of the cheer team coached by Monica Aldama. Prior to starring on the series Cheer, a video of him cheering on his teammates at a sporting event went viral. Marshall's mother suffered from addiction and was imprisoned during his childhood. He also struggled to be accepted by his brothers after coming out to them as gay and experienced sexual abuse. In January 2020, he appeared on The Ellen DeGeneres Show, along with other members of the team.

In April 2023, Marshall was suspended by USA Cheer and the U.S. All Star Federation (USASF), two of cheerleading's governing bodies, and is "listed as temporarily ineligible pending an investigation."
