= Jerry Harris (cheerleader) =

American cheerleader (born 1999), Convicted child sex offender

- Born: Jeremiah Harris; July 14, 1999 (age 27); Hinsdale, Illinois, U.S.
- Education: Navarro College
- Years active: 2020–2022
- Criminal charges: Enticing a child, producing child pornography (2022)
- Criminal penalty: 12 years imprisonment
- Criminal status: Incarcerated

Jeremiah Harris (born July 14, 1999) is a former collegiate cheerleader who received international recognition after appearing in the 2020 Netflix docuseries Cheer. In September and December 2020, he was charged by the Federal Bureau of Investigation (FBI) with production of child pornography and other child-related sex crimes: "sexual exploitation of children, receiving child pornography, traveling with the attempt to engage in sexual conduct with a minor, and enticement", among other charges. On February 10, 2022, Harris took a plea deal, and pled guilty as charged to two of the seven indictments against him. On July 6, 2022, Harris was sentenced to 12 years in prison, after which he is required to register as a sex offender, and 8 years of court supervised probation to commence after his release from prison.

== Early life and education ==
Harris was born in Hinsdale, Illinois and raised in Bolingbrook, Illinois. When he was 16 years old, his mother died from lung cancer. He attended Waubonsie Valley High School followed by Navarro College in Corsicana, Texas, where he was a member of the cheerleader team coached by Monica Aldama. During the season one finale of Cheer, he received a Regional Scholars Award from the University of Louisville. He attended the school for the fall semester, but ultimately returned to Navarro College. He became famous for his eccentric personality.

== Career ==
In January 2020, he appeared on The Ellen DeGeneres Show, along with other members of the Cheer team. In February 2020, DeGeneres announced that Harris would be The Ellen DeGeneres Show's Oscars correspondent. He is known for his eccentric and over-the-top "mat talk," a cheerleading term, in which he yells and cheers on other people.

During the COVID-19 pandemic, he made a guest appearance on the cheerleading themed song "Mas(k)ot" by Todrick Hall from his album Quarantine Queen.

== 2020 arrest ==
In September 2020, the FBI announced they had a warrant for Harris for allegedly soliciting sex from minors. The case involves twin brothers who were 13 when Harris, 19 at the time, sent suggestive messages asking for pictures and seeking sex. The boys' mother at first dismissed the contacts, but after another cheerleading coach allegedly assaulted them, felt there might be a pervasive atmosphere of tolerance of sexual abuse either in the sport or the companies that govern them. United States All Star Federation, Varsity Spirit and Cheer Athletics were later named as parties to the legal proceedings.

On September 17, 2020, Harris was arrested by the FBI and charged in federal court in Chicago for production of child pornography. Harris allegedly admitted to soliciting and receiving explicit messages on Snapchat from other individuals he knew were minors; he also allegedly admitted to having sex with a 15-year-old in mid-2019 when Harris was 19, according to federal court records. Harris was suspended from at least one company, and faced the loss of several sponsorships. A spokesperson for Harris denied the allegations, "We categorically dispute the claims made against Jerry Harris, which are alleged to have occurred when he was a teenager. We are confident that when the investigation is completed the true facts will be revealed." Harris's cheer coach Monica Aldama posted on Instagram that she was devastated by the news of his arrest.

In a statement about his arrest, Netflix said "Like everyone we are shocked by this news. Any abuse of minors is a terrible crime and we respect the legal process."

On December 12, 2020, it was reported that Harris faced an additional seven charges involving incidents with four other minors from August 2017 to August 2020, including a charge involving an alleged incident where Harris traveled from Texas to Florida to have sex with a 15-year-old in May 2019. Harris pleaded not guilty to the new charges.

On February 10, 2022, Harris pleaded guilty to allegations of child sex abuse. He was obtaining photos of child sexual abuse and soliciting sex from minors. Harris was held without bond in a federal detention center and was set to be sentenced on June 28, 2022. Harris was instead sentenced on July 6, 2022 to 12 years in prison, followed by registration as a sex offender and eight years of court-supervised probation.
