= Couples Therapy (2019 TV series) =

2019 American television series

- Genre: Documentary
- Created by: Eli Despres; Elyse Steinberg; Josh Kriegman
- Directed by: Eli Despres; Elyse Steinberg; Josh Kriegman; Kim Roberts; Maya Seidler; Pax Wassermann; Joshua Altman; Bennett Elliott
- Starring: Orna Guralnik
- Composer: Jason Hill
- Country of origin: United States
- Original language: English
- No. of seasons: 5
- No. of episodes: 63 + 1 special

Production
- Executive producers: Eli Despres; Elyse Steinberg; Josh Kriegman
- Producers: Carly Hugo; Matt Parker; Maya Seider; Sophie Kissinger
- Cinematography: Wyatt Garfield; Maria Rusche; Armaan Virani
- Editors: Kim Roberts; Delaney Lynch; Helen Kearns; Katrina Taylor; Aimee Lyde; Jawad Metni; Ryan Loeffler; Eileen Meyer
- Running time: 25-30 minutes
- Production companies: Edgeline Films; Paramount Television Studios (Note: Known as Showtime Studios for season 1–4)

Original release
- Network: Showtime
- Release: September 6, 2019 – May 26, 2023
- Network: Paramount+ with Showtime
- Release: June 2, 2024 – present

Couples Therapy is an American television series on the Showtime network. The series documents couples therapy sessions under the direction of Dr. Orna Guralnik.

== Overview ==
Couples Therapy shows parts of the therapy sessions of three to four couples per season. The producers and therapist of the series wanted to show what a therapeutic process actually looks like. They didn't want to show drama to the audiences, but the deep work that real therapy entails.

Dr. Orna Guralnik, the couples' therapist, meets her patients for the first time when they enter her practice. Her practice features many cameras hidden behind a one-way mirror that surrounds the room. The couples participate in a 20-week therapy program. The one-hour-sessions are recorded, cut for television and edited into nine episodes. The television series is filmed in New York.

There are some rules about the therapy sessions. The couples are not allowed to have any more in-depth discussions about their children, because the children cannot give their consent to the therapy treatment and their life being discussed on television. The couples have no contact with the crew members. They only meet the couples' therapist, Dr. Guralnik. Guralnik has a counselor, Virginia Goldner, with whom she discusses the therapy process. In the Covid Special she has another counselor, Kirkland Vaughans.

== Idea and realization ==
Director Josh Kriegman came up with the idea for the series. His parents are both psychotherapists. From an early age he had heard a lot about this work. He was fascinated by the therapy processes and what can be achieved by it. He hoped that he would be able to show the therapy process on television. He thought a long time about how this would work in an authentic way.

Along with the directors Eli B. Despres and Elyse Steinberg, Kriegman planned a reality TV series for Showtime.

At first they wanted to find the right therapist. So the production team interviewed a few therapists in New York. They contacted Guralnik through her Psychoanalytic Institute. At first Guralnik only wanted to be the counselor for the therapist, but after a few discussions with the directors, she decided to be the therapist and not the counselor. It was important to her that the TV series is very close to real therapy instead of relying on dramatization.

The couples of the series were chosen from thousands in a selection process. The selection processes for each couple took about four months in total. When selecting the couples, it was important to the producers that they had emotional intelligence. They also wanted to find couples who didn't just want to be on TV, but had real problems. The viewers should also be able to identify themselves with the couples. A variety of couples should be shown, who differ in age, sexual orientation, gender identity or ethnicity. The couples should be open to exploring their relationship. Not all couples were shown in the series. For example, they filmed six couples for the first season and only four couples were shown on television.

The set of the therapy room was designed very similar to Guralnik's own office. The books, the distance between the therapy chair and the couch for the couples were all taken from Guralnik's own office. Production crew are not directly present in the therapy room during filming. Cameras are concealed behind one-way mirrors set at 45º to reflect carefully-placed printed mirrored image, making it look to the viewer as if there are no cameras in the room.

== Cast ==
Therapist

- Dr. Orna Guralnik is a psychologist, psychoanalyst, and the couples therapist of the television series. She describes herself as a systemically oriented couples therapist. As such, she does not view a couple as an individual but as a system.

Counselors

- Virginia Goldner is the counselor of Guralnik. Guralnik talks to her about the therapy processes, her own feelings and counter-transferences. Goldner is a psychoanalyst. As such, she does individual, couples and family therapy. She is also a professor at New York University's postdoctoral program in psychotherapy and psychoanalysis.
- Kirkland Vaughans is the counselor of Guralnik in the Covid Special. Guralnik contacted him after the murder of George Floyd. Guralnik's patients were dealing with their own experiences of racism after hearing of the murder. Vaughans is Professor of Psychology at Adelphi University in New York, Director of the Postgraduate Program in Child and Adolescent Psychotherapy, and Clinical Supervisor at the National Institute for Psychotherapies.

Peer Advisory Group

- Nuar Alsadir, PhD, LP
- Cynthia Chalker, MSS, LCSW
- Ken Cormbett, PhD
- Kali Cyrus, MD, MPH
- Stephen Hartman, PhD
- Tom Inck, PhD
- Eyal Rozmarin, PhD

The Couples

- Season 1
  - Annie & Mau
  - Lauren & Sarah
  - Evelyn & Alan
  - Elaine & DeSean
- Covid Special
  - Lauren & Sarah – from Season 1
  - Elaine & DeSean – from Season 1
  - Lara & Trey
  - Michelle & James
- Season 2
  - Michael & Michal
  - Tashira & Dru
  - Matthew & Gianni
- Season 3A
  - Ping & Will
  - Molly & Josh
  - India & Dale
  - Cyn & Yaya
- Season 3B
  - Brock & Kristi
  - Josh & Natasha
  - Nadine & Christine
  - Sean & Erica
- Season 4A
  - Josh & Aryn & Lorena
  - Joey & Rex
  - Elíana & Mitch
  - Casimar & Alexes
- Season 4B
  - Nick & Katherine
  - Kyle & Mondo
  - Alison & Rod
  - Jessica & Boris
- Season 5
  - Marjorie & Jason
  - Sienna & Chris
  - Shay & Clinton
  - Nessa & Drea

== Production and release ==
The series was renewed for a second season, which premiered on April 18, 2021.

In June 2021, it was announced that there would be a third season of Couples Therapy. It began airing on May 13, 2022. The show filmed new couples for the second half of season three which finished filming towards the end of 2022 and premiered on April 28, 2023. The entire back half of the season was put up for streaming and on-demand viewing through Showtime on this date; linear airings were two episodes per week.

The fourth season premiered on May 31, 2024 in full on the Paramount+ streaming service's Paramount+ with Showtime tier as well as on Video On Demand on cable, satellite, and streaming services for subscribers to the Paramount+ with Showtime linear channel. Additionally, the show aired on the linear channel from June 2 to June 30 with 2 episodes per week. The second part of season 4 was released in full on Paramount+ on May 23, 2025 with air dates on the linear channel beginning on the same date.

A fifth season was ordered in June 2025, with Paramount Television Studios taking over production for the fifth season when Showtime Studios' parent Paramount Global merged with Skydance Media to form Paramount Skydance. The fifth season premiered on May 15, 2026 on Paramount+ Premium, with all nine episodes released simultaneously. Linear airings on Paramount+ with Showtime began on May 17, 2026.

== Series overview ==
Season	Episodes		Originally released	
Season	Episodes		First released	Last released
1	9		September 6, 2019	November 1, 2019
Special	1		December 13, 2020	
2	9		April 18, 2021	May 16, 2021
3	18	9	May 13, 2022	June 10, 2022
3	18	9	April 28, 2023	May 26, 2023
4	18	9	June 2, 2024	June 30, 2024
4	18	9	May 23, 2025	June 13, 2025
5	9		May 17, 2026	June 7, 2026

=== Season 1 (2019) ===
No. overall	No. in season	Title	Directed by	Original release date
1	1	"Episode 1"	Eli B. Despres, Josh Kriegman, Elyse Steinberg	September 6, 2019
2	2	"Episode 2"	Eli B. Despres, Josh Kriegman, Elyse Steinberg	September 13, 2019
3	3	"Episode 3"	Eli B. Despres, Josh Kriegman, Elyse Steinberg	September 20, 2019
4	4	"Episode 4"	Eli B. Despres, Josh Kriegman, Elyse Steinberg	September 27, 2019
5	5	"Episode 5"	Eli B. Despres, Josh Kriegman, Elyse Steinberg	October 4, 2019
6	6	"Episode 6"	Eli B. Despres, Josh Kriegman, Elyse Steinberg	October 11, 2019
7	7	"Episode 7"	Eli B. Despres, Josh Kriegman, Elyse Steinberg	October 18, 2019
8	8	"Episode 8"	Eli B. Despres, Josh Kriegman, Elyse Steinberg	October 25, 2019
9	9	"Episode 9"	Eli B. Despres, Josh Kriegman, Elyse Steinberg, Kim Roberts	November 1, 2019

=== The COVID Special (2020) ===
No. overall	No. in season	Title	Directed by	Original release date
10	1	"The COVID Special"	Kim Roberts	December 13, 2020

=== Season 2 (2021) ===
No. overall	No. in season	Title	Directed by	Original release date
11	1	"Episode 1"	Josh Kriegman, Kim Roberts	April 18, 2021
12	2	"Episode 2"	Josh Kriegman, Kim Roberts	April 18, 2021
13	3	"Episode 3"	Josh Kriegman, Kim Roberts	April 25, 2021
14	4	"Episode 4"	Josh Kriegman, Kim Roberts	April 25, 2021
15	5	"Episode 5"	Josh Kriegman, Kim Roberts	May 2, 2021
16	6	"Episode 6"	Josh Kriegman, Kim Roberts	May 2, 2021
17	7	"Episode 7"	Josh Kriegman, Kim Roberts	May 9, 2021
18	8	"Episode 8"	Josh Kriegman, Kim Roberts	May 9, 2021
19	9	"Episode 9"	Josh Kriegman, Kim Roberts	May 16, 2021

=== Season 3 (2022–23) ===
No. overall	No. in season	Title	Directed by	Original release date
Part 1
20	1	"Episode 1"	Maya Seidler, Pax Wassermann	May 13, 2022
21	2	"Episode 2"	Maya Seidler, Pax Wassermann	May 13, 2022
22	3	"Episode 3"	Maya Seidler, Pax Wassermann	May 20, 2022
23	4	"Episode 4"	Maya Seidler, Pax Wassermann	May 20, 2022
24	5	"Episode 5"	Maya Seidler, Pax Wassermann	May 27, 2022
25	6	"Episode 6"	Maya Seidler, Pax Wassermann	May 27, 2022
26	7	"Episode 7"	Maya Seidler, Pax Wassermann	June 3, 2022
27	8	"Episode 8"	Maya Seidler, Pax Wassermann	June 3, 2022
28	9	"Episode 9"	Maya Seidler, Pax Wassermann	June 10, 2022
Part 2
29	10	"Episode 10"	Joshua Altman, Bennett Elliott	April 28, 2023
30	11	"Episode 11"	Joshua Altman, Bennett Elliott	April 28, 2023
31	12	"Episode 12"	Joshua Altman, Bennett Elliott	May 5, 2023
32	13	"Episode 13"	Joshua Altman, Bennett Elliott	May 5, 2023
33	14	"Episode 14"	Joshua Altman, Bennett Elliott	May 12, 2023
34	15	"Episode 15"	Joshua Altman, Bennett Elliott	May 12, 2023
35	16	"Episode 16"	Joshua Altman, Bennett Elliott	May 19, 2023
36	17	"Episode 17"	Joshua Altman, Bennett Elliott	May 19, 2023
37	18	"Episode 18"	Joshua Altman, Bennett Elliott	May 26, 2023

=== Season 4 (2024–25) ===
No. overall	No. in season	Title	Directed by	Original release date
Part 1
38	1	"Episode 1"	Kim Roberts	June 2, 2024
39	2	"Episode 2"	Kim Roberts	June 2, 2024
40	3	"Episode 3"	Kim Roberts	June 9, 2024
41	4	"Episode 4"	Kim Roberts	June 9, 2024
42	5	"Episode 5"	Kim Roberts	June 16, 2024
43	6	"Episode 6"	Kim Roberts	June 16, 2024
44	7	"Episode 7"	Kim Roberts	June 23, 2024
45	8	"Episode 8"	Kim Roberts	June 23, 2024
46	9	"Episode 9"	Kim Roberts	June 30, 2024
Part 2
47	10	"Episode 10"	Bennett Elliott, Pax Wassermann	May 23, 2025
48	11	"Episode 11"	Bennett Elliott, Pax Wassermann	May 23, 2025
49	12	"Episode 12"	Bennett Elliott, Pax Wassermann	May 23, 2025
50	13	"Episode 13"	Bennett Elliott, Pax Wassermann	May 30, 2025
51	14	"Episode 14"	Bennett Elliott, Pax Wassermann	May 30, 2025
52	15	"Episode 15"	Bennett Elliott, Pax Wassermann	June 6, 2025
53	16	"Episode 16"	Bennett Elliott, Pax Wassermann	June 6, 2025
54	17	"Episode 17"	Bennett Elliott, Pax Wassermann	June 13, 2025
55	18	"Episode 18"	Bennett Elliott, Pax Wassermann	June 13, 2025

=== Season 5 (2026) ===
No. overall	No. in season	Title	Directed by	Original release date
56	1	"Episode 1"	Unknown	May 17, 2026
57	2	"Episode 2"	Unknown	May 17, 2026
58	3	"Episode 3"	Unknown	May 17, 2026
59	4	"Episode 4"	Unknown	May 24, 2026
60	5	"Episode 5"	Unknown	May 24, 2026
61	6	"Episode 6"	Unknown	May 31, 2026
62	7	"Episode 7"	Unknown	May 31, 2026
63	8	"Episode 8"	Unknown	June 7, 2026
64	9	"Episode 9"	Unknown	June 7, 2026

== Awards and nominations ==
TCA Awards

- 2021: TCA Award for Outstanding Achievement in Reality Programming

== International versions ==
On July 26, 2022, the Australian streaming portal Paramount+ began airing a series of the same name. The psychotherapist is Marryam Chehelnabi. Her therapeutic work is based on the therapy methods of Julie Schwartz Gottman and John Gottman. Chehelnabi's supervisor is Lea Crisante. The second season of the series is scheduled to air in November 2022.

A New Zealand edition of the show premiered in 2023.

The American version has been shown on the BBC in the UK.

== See also ==
- List of programs broadcast by Showtime
