= Orna Guralnik =

Israeli-American psychologist and psychoanalyst

- Born: 1963 or 1964 (age 62–63); Washington, D.C., U.S.
- Education: Tel Aviv University (BA); Yeshiva University (MA, PsyD)
- Known for: Couples Therapy (2019–present)
- Children: 2

Orna Guralnik (born 1963/1964) is a clinical psychologist and psychoanalyst based in Park Slope, Brooklyn. She is best known as the therapist on the Paramount+ documentary series Couples Therapy (2019–present) and teaches in the postdoctoral psychoanalysis program at New York University.

== Early life and education ==
Guralnik was born in Washington, D.C., to Israeli parents. Her mother, Nehama, trained in architecture before turning to art history and eventually became a curator at the Tel Aviv Museum of Art. Her father, Daniel, was an aeronautical engineer who worked at the Israeli Embassy in Washington D.C. The family later moved to Atlanta, where he took a position with Lockheed Martin. In 1971, when Guralnik was seven, her father was recruited by El Al Airlines and the family relocated to Tel Aviv. Her parents became U.S. citizens during the Atlanta years. She has a younger brother, Michael Roy.

As a teenager in Tel Aviv, Guralnik clashed with her father and was sent to therapy. She credits the second therapist she saw, a female psychiatrist, as someone who changed the course of her life. She also read widely in Freud, Carl Whitaker, and R.D. Laing during this period.

After high school, she completed mandatory military service, traveled for a year, and studied film at Tel Aviv University before moving to New York in 1990. She earned her master's and doctoral degrees in clinical psychology from Yeshiva University and completed ten years of postdoctoral psychoanalytic training at NYU.

== Career ==
Guralnik maintains a private clinical practice in Brooklyn and is on the faculty of NYU's postdoctoral psychoanalysis program. She writes for both academic and general audiences and is working on a book.

== Couples Therapy ==
In 2016, a colleague introduced Guralnik to the filmmakers developing Couples Therapy. She initially offered to consult on the project; co-creator Elyse Steinberg and the team convinced her to appear on camera. The series debuted on Showtime in 2019 and is now in its fifth season on Paramount+ with Showtime.

The project originated over conversations at Café Regular, a coffee shop in Park Slope. Guralnik was initially reluctant, describing herself as part of a profession where privacy is "the number one frame or rule of the game," and the first sessions as "one big experiment." She has described her goal on the show as promoting "psychological thinking" rather than therapy per se.

== Recognition ==
The New Yorker published a profile of Guralnik in May 2022 and featured her in a 2024 books column on the intersection of ideology and private experience. She appeared on Michelle Obama's podcast in 2025.

After the show's debut, Guralnik became an unexpected subject of fashion interest, with fans on Reddit, TikTok, and Instagram identifying and tracking down pieces from her wardrobe.

== Personal life ==
Guralnik has lived in Park Slope for more than twenty years and resides in a brownstone there. She has two children: an adult daughter, Ruby, and a son.
