= Cheer (TV series) =

2020 American TV docuseries

- Genre: Docuseries
- Created by: Greg Whiteley
- Directed by: Greg Whiteley; Chelsea Yarnell (Season 2)
- Starring: Monica Aldama; Gabi Butler; Jerry Harris; Morgan Simianer; Lexi Brumback; La'Darius Marshall; Mackenzie Sherburn; Shannon Woolsey
- Composers: Yuri Tománek; Joseph Minadeo
- Country of origin: United States
- Original language: English
- No. of seasons: 2
- No. of episodes: 15

Production
- Executive producers: Greg Whiteley; Andrew Fried; Dane Lillegard; Jasper Thomlinson (Season 1); Bert Hamelinck (Season 1)
- Producers: Arielle Kilker (Season 1); Chelsea Yarnell
- Running time: 57–62 minutes
- Production companies: One Potato Productions; Boardwalk Pictures; Caviar

Original release
- Network: Netflix
- Release: January 8, 2020 – January 12, 2022

Cheer is an American sport television docuseries airing on Netflix starting in January 2020. The six-part series follows the nationally ranked forty-member Navarro College Bulldogs Cheer Team from Corsicana, Texas, under the direction of coach Monica Aldama, as they prepare to compete in the National Cheerleading Championship held annually in Daytona Beach, Florida. The episodes focus especially on five individual Cheer Team members and include elements of the history of cheerleading, including the formation of the National Cheerleaders Association (NCA).

As the series begins, the Cheer Team has won fourteen NCA National Championships in the "advanced large coed" junior college division, (Note: As of January 2020, the Navarro College Cheer Team has won fourteen National Championships since 2000: 2000, 2003-2004, 2006-2007, 2009-2015, 2018-2019.) as well as five "Grand Nationals" for the highest score of all teams in the competition. (Note: The Navarro College Cheer Team has won five NCA Grand National Championships since 2012: 2013-2015, 2018-2019; they currently hold the record for the highest score in history at the NCA College Nationals.) Their only rival in the division is Trinity Valley Community College in Athens, Texas, roughly forty miles away. The final episode of the first season discusses the outsized influence of Varsity Brands—just acquired by Bain Capital—that seems to control most aspects of the billion-dollar competitive cheerleading industry, including broadcast rights of the Daytona finals. The second season premiered on January 12, 2022. Some of its episodes address the charges of child sexual exploitation levied against first season star Jerry Harris, who was later sentenced to 12 years in prison in July 2022.

== Background ==
Cheerleading developed from mere boosterism into a sport gradually; as one team would develop pyramids, baskets, jumps, stunts, and creative tumbling skills from cheerleading, circus arts (like balancing), and dancing—other teams would emulate and build on those tricks. Unlike most college sports, cheerleading has no professional league after college, so the National Cheerleading Championship held annually in Daytona Beach, Florida is the highest-level event where cheerleaders can compete. As of 2020, competitive cheerleading is a billion dollar industry.

Director Greg Whiteley came across competitive cheerleading while filming for his football television series Last Chance U. He was struck by the cheerleaders' athleticism and highly competitive drive.

Navarro College, a "9,000-student community college in Corsicana, Texas, about fifty miles south of Dallas," has a cheer team coached by Monica Aldama who graduated from Corsicana High School, earned a degree in Finance at the University of Texas at Austin, then a Master of Business Administration at the University of Texas at Tyler. She was a cheerleader in college. Because of her devotion to her extended Texan family, and her husband's desire to raise their children near their families, she accepted the position of cheerleading coach at Navarro College. Starting in 2000, she built the program from the ground up, making it into one of the best in the nation.

== Episodes ==
=== Series overview ===
Season	Episodes	Originally released
1	6	January 8, 2020
2	9	January 12, 2022

=== Season 1 (2020) ===
No. overall	No. in season	Title	Original release date
1	1	"God Blessed Texas"	January 8, 2020
2	2	"Making Mat"	January 8, 2020
3	3	"Blood, Sweat and Cheers"	January 8, 2020
4	4	"Hit Zero"	January 8, 2020
5	5	"Full Out"	January 8, 2020
6	6	"Daytona"	January 8, 2020

=== Season 2 (2022) ===
No. overall	No. in season	Title	Original release date
7	1	"Everybody Hopes"	January 12, 2022
8	2	"Here's to We"	January 12, 2022
9	3	"Dracut Girl"	January 12, 2022
10	4	"Hell Week"	January 12, 2022
11	5	"Jerry"	January 12, 2022
12	6	"Tumbling"	January 12, 2022
13	7	"Mining for Tenths"	January 12, 2022
14	8	"Daytona Pt. 1 : Don't Be That Guy"	January 12, 2022
15	9	"Daytona Pt. 2 : If the Judges Disagree"	January 12, 2022

== Reception ==
On Rotten Tomatoes the series holds an approval rating of 96% based on 23 reviews, with an average of 7.75/10. The website's critics consensus reads: "With an inspirational troupe of teens and willingness to engage in the tougher trials facing the sport today, Cheer perfectly captures the highs and lows of what it takes to be a cheerleader." On Metacritic, it has a weighted average score of 81 out of 100, based on seven critics, indicating "universal acclaim".

The Washington Post's Hank Stuever wrote, "Cheer quickly and effortlessly becomes all-consuming for the viewer. Whiteley superbly structures the story through six episodes to heighten the anxiety as the competition nears." Vulture's Jen Chaney stated, "while it depicts plenty of conflicts and disagreements between the cheerleaders at Navarro College in Corsicana, Texas, it's an ultimately more uplifting show that uses cheer as a prism through which to explore overcoming all kinds of obstacles." Rolling Stone wrote, "...it's Apocalypse Now with pompoms," and "It's not tough to see why America is obsessed with Cheer: At a time when our democratic ideals are smashed to pieces, threatening all our illusions of leadership, Cheer offers a fantasy cheer-ocracy, with Monica as a scarily credible cheer-tator."

In January 2020, the Navarro cheer team and coach Monica appeared on The Ellen DeGeneres Show, and performed a full routine; Ellen DeGeneres presented them with $20,000 toward their fundraising goal. The January 25, 2020, episode of Saturday Night Live had a sketch spoofing Cheer with guest host Adam Driver as one of the coaches apparently unconcerned as team members want to make the mat—the twenty chosen for the finals—so bad they want to cheer despite near-catastrophic injuries. In late January 2020, The Late Show with Stephen Colbert featured a spoof commercial about mat talk, the boisterous positivity sideline cheers that teammates do for the performing members—for which Jerry Harris was singled-out during the series as excelling in—for their performance. The conceit was a new booster Mat Talk for Regular People program whereby the Navarro Cheer Team members would praise everyday people for mundane activities, and featured La'Darius Marshall, Harris, and Gabi Butler cheering people on, with coach Monica Aldama available for a Booster Shot.

In December 2020, Harris was charged with multiple counts of production of child pornography and sexual exploitation, at least some of which involved children he mentored in cheerleading; he was sentenced to 12 years in prison in July 2022.

== Awards and nominations ==
Year	Award	Category	Nominee(s)	Result	Ref.
2020	Primetime Emmy Awards	Outstanding Unstructured Reality Program	Greg Whiteley, Andrew Fried, Dane Lillegard, Jasper Thomlinson, Bert Hamelinck, Adam Leibowitz, Arielle Kilker, and Chelsea Yarnell	Won	
2020	Primetime Emmy Awards	Outstanding Directing for a Reality Program	Greg Whiteley (for "Daytona")	Won	
2020	Primetime Emmy Awards	Outstanding Cinematography for a Reality Program	Melissa Langer and Erynn Patrick (for "Hit Zero")	Nominated	
2020	Primetime Emmy Awards	Outstanding Picture Editing for an Unstructured Reality Program	Arielle Kilker, David Nordstrom, Kate Hackett, Daniel McDonald, Mark Morgan, Sharon Weaver, and Ted Woerner (for "God Blessed Texas")	Won	
2020	Primetime Emmy Awards	Outstanding Sound Editing for a Nonfiction or Reality Program (Single or Multi-Camera)	Logan Byers, Kaleb Klinger, and Sean Gray (for "Daytona")	Nominated	
2020	Primetime Emmy Awards	Outstanding Sound Mixing for a Nonfiction or Reality Program (Single or Multi-Camera)	Ryan David Adams (for "Daytona")	Nominated	
2020	Television Critics Association Awards	Outstanding Achievement in Reality Programming	Cheer	Won	
2021	American Cinema Editors Awards	Best Edited Non-Scripted Series	Arielle Kilker, David Nordstrom, Kate Hackett, Daniel McDonald, Mark Morgan, Sharon Weaver, and Ted Woerner (for "God Blessed Texas")	Won	
2022	Television Critics Association Awards	Outstanding Achievement in Reality Programming	Cheer	Nominated	
2022	Primetime Emmy Awards	Outstanding Unstructured Reality Program	Greg Whiteley, Andrew Fried, Dane Lillegard, Adam Leibowitz, Mark Cummins, and Chelsea Yarnell	Nominated	
2022	Primetime Emmy Awards	Outstanding Directing for a Reality Program	Greg Whiteley (for "Daytona Pt. 2: If The Judges Disagree")	Nominated	
2022	Primetime Emmy Awards	Outstanding Picture Editing for an Unstructured Reality Program	Daniel George McDonald, Daniel J. Clark, Zachary Fuhrer, Stefanie Maridueña, Dana Martell, Jody McVeigh-Schultz, Sharon Weaver, and David Zucker (for "Daytona Pt. 2: If The Judges Disagree")	Nominated	
