= Monica Aldama =

American cheerleading coach (born 1972)

- Born: February 9, 1972 (age 54); Alabama, U.S.
- Education: Tyler Junior College; University of Texas at Austin; University of Texas at Tyler
- Occupations: Cheerleading coach Television personality
- Spouse: Chris Aldama (January 1994-present)
- Children: 2

Monica Aldama (born February 9, 1972) is an American cheerleading coach. She was the coach of the co-ed cheerleading team at Navarro College in Corsicana, Texas.

== Education ==
A graduate of Corsicana High School, Aldama enrolled at Tyler Junior College where she joined the cheerleading squad. She subsequently transferred to the University of Texas at Austin where she earned a BBA in Finance from the McCombs School of Business, and was a member of the Zeta Tau Alpha women's fraternity. She went on to graduate from the University of Texas at Tyler with a Master of Business Administration.

== Achievement in coaching ==
Under Aldama's leadership, the Navarro College Bulldogs have earned a national reputation for excellence in cheerleading. Since 2000, Aldama's squads have won 16 NCA National Championships in the Advanced Large Coed Junior College division, and 1 National Championship in the Game Day Open division, in addition to 6 "Grand National" designations. Grand National status is bestowed upon the team with the highest overall score in that year's competition. Aldama's team also holds the record for the highest score achieved at NCA College Nationals. Her cheerleading program has been called a "dynasty" and her athletes refer to her as the "Queen." Aldama has appeared on The Ellen DeGeneres Show and Oprah's live tour.

== Appearance in Cheer ==
In 2020, Aldama featured in a Netflix docuseries titled Cheer, whose focus on the 2019 Navarro College coed cheerleading team served to introduce the sport to a wide audience. Cheer was directed by documentarian Greg Whiteley, who until this series was best known for his football-related documentary Last Chance U. Both series empathetically follow college athletes struggling with injuries and challenges in their personal lives. Cheer centers its narrative on Aldama's mentorship, which is generally nurturing even as mounting injuries to her athletes lead her to make pragmatic decisions in support of the team's goal of winning the national championship at Daytona Beach, Florida. Responses to the series' representation of Aldama highlight the resultant tension. Television critic Hank Stuever of The Washington Post describes Aldama's dedication as "fierce (and occasionally fearsome)." To critic Jia Tolentino of The New Yorker Aldama "rules the program with a fearsomely controlled demeanor interrupted by flickers of maternal warmth." Overall, the series highlights Aldama's perfectionism, encapsulated in her hallmark conviction concerning practice: "You keep going until you get it right, then you keep going until you can't get it wrong."

== Dancing with the Stars ==
On September 2, 2020, it was announced that Aldama would be participating in the 29th season of Dancing with the Stars. She was partnered with Val Chmerkovskiy, and was eliminated on the 7th week, placing 10th.

== Personal life ==
Aldama's son–in–law Trevor Denbow is an American football safety for the Indianapolis Colts.
