= 2nd Gotham TV Awards =

2025 American television programming awards

- Date: June 2, 2025
- Location: Cipriani Wall Street, New York City
- Country: United States
- Presented by: The Gotham Film & Media Institute

Highlights
- Most wins: Adolescence (3)
- Most nominations: Adolescence (4)
- Breakthrough Comedy Series: The Studio
- Breakthrough Drama Series: The Pitt
- Breakthrough Limited Series: Adolescence

The 2nd Gotham TV Awards (also known as the 2025 Gotham TV Awards), presented by the Gotham Film & Media Institute, were held on June 2, 2025, at Cipriani Wall Street in New York City.

The nominations were announced on April 29, 2025. Netflix limited series Adolescence led the nominations with four, followed by the drama series Matlock and The Pitt, and the limited series Dying for Sex, all with three each.

Multiple categories were introduced, including Outstanding Original Film, Broadcast, or Streaming, as well as supporting performance awards; these new categories increase the number of awards from seven to twelve. South Korean director and producer Hwang Dong-hyuk, and American writers and directors Amy Sherman-Palladino and Daniel Palladino were honored with Creator Tributes.

== Winners and nominees ==
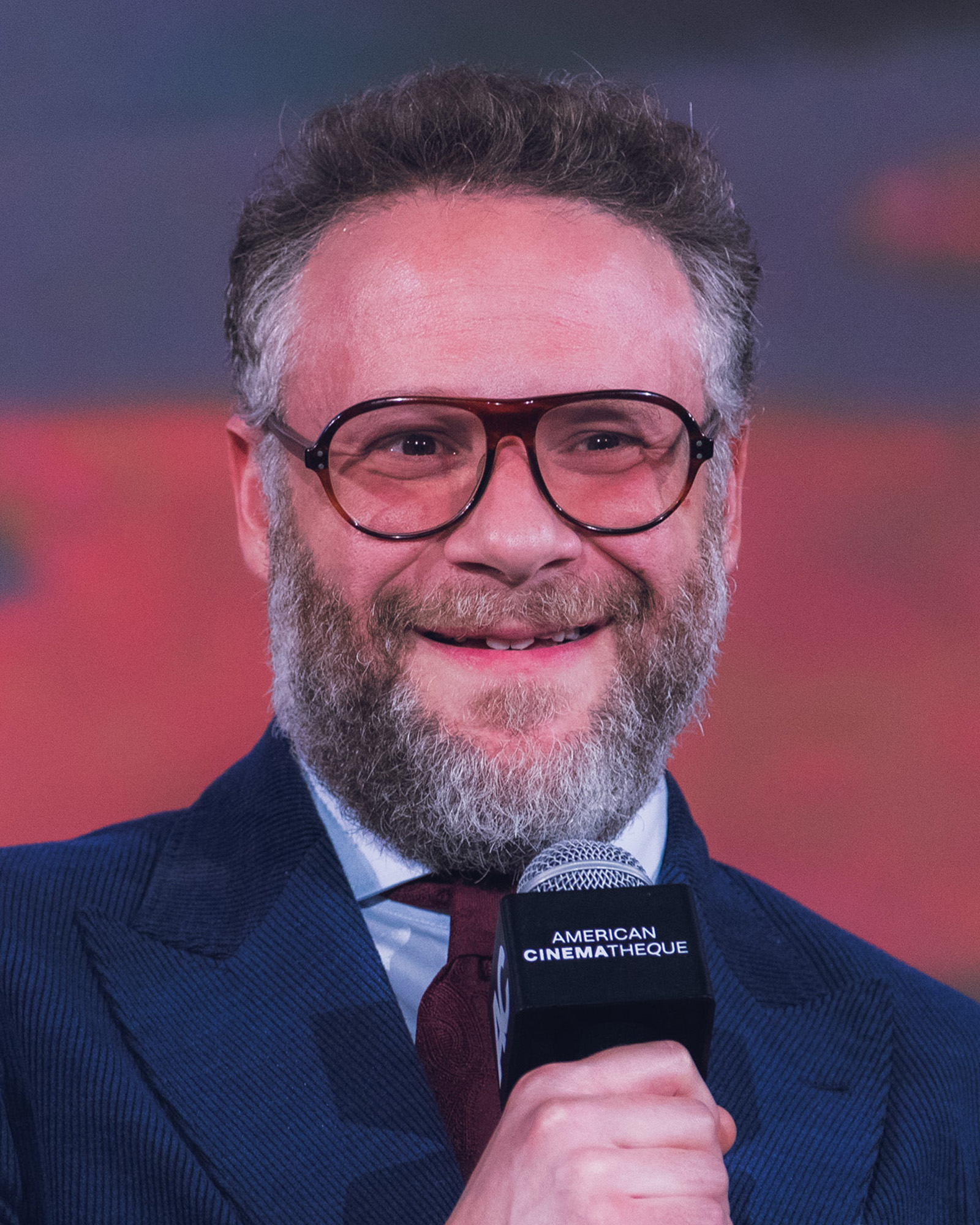
Seth Rogen, Breakthrough Comedy Series co-winner

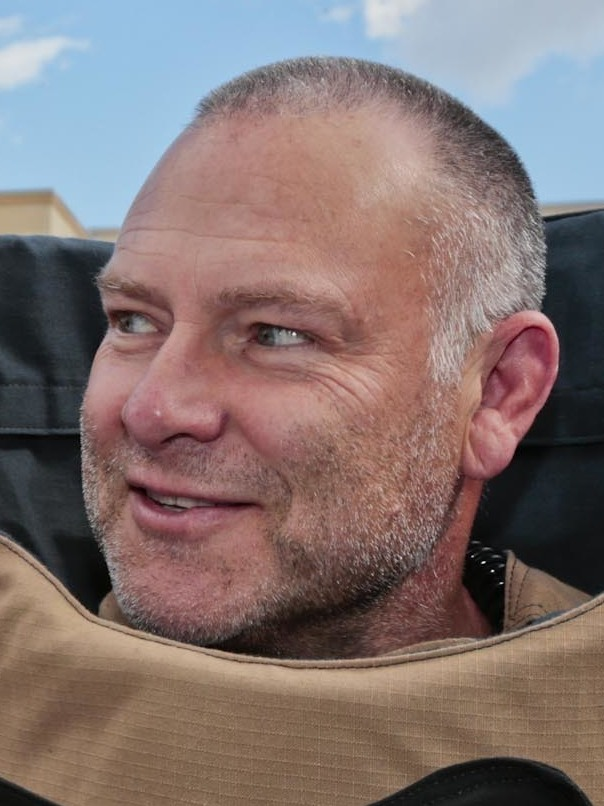
R. Scott Gemmill, Breakthrough Drama Series co-winner

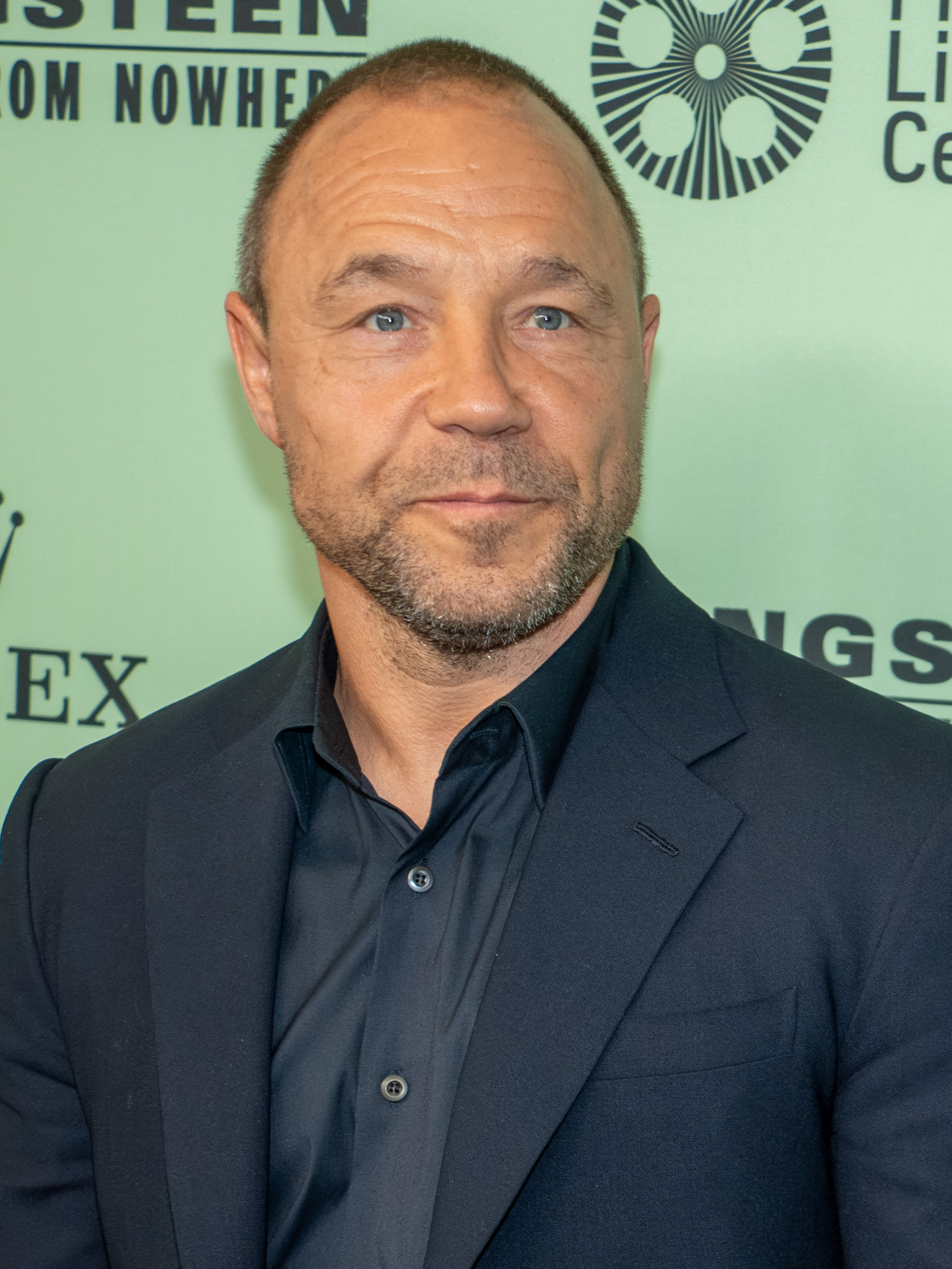
Stephen Graham, Breakthrough Limited Series co-winner and Outstanding Lead Performance in a Limited Series winner

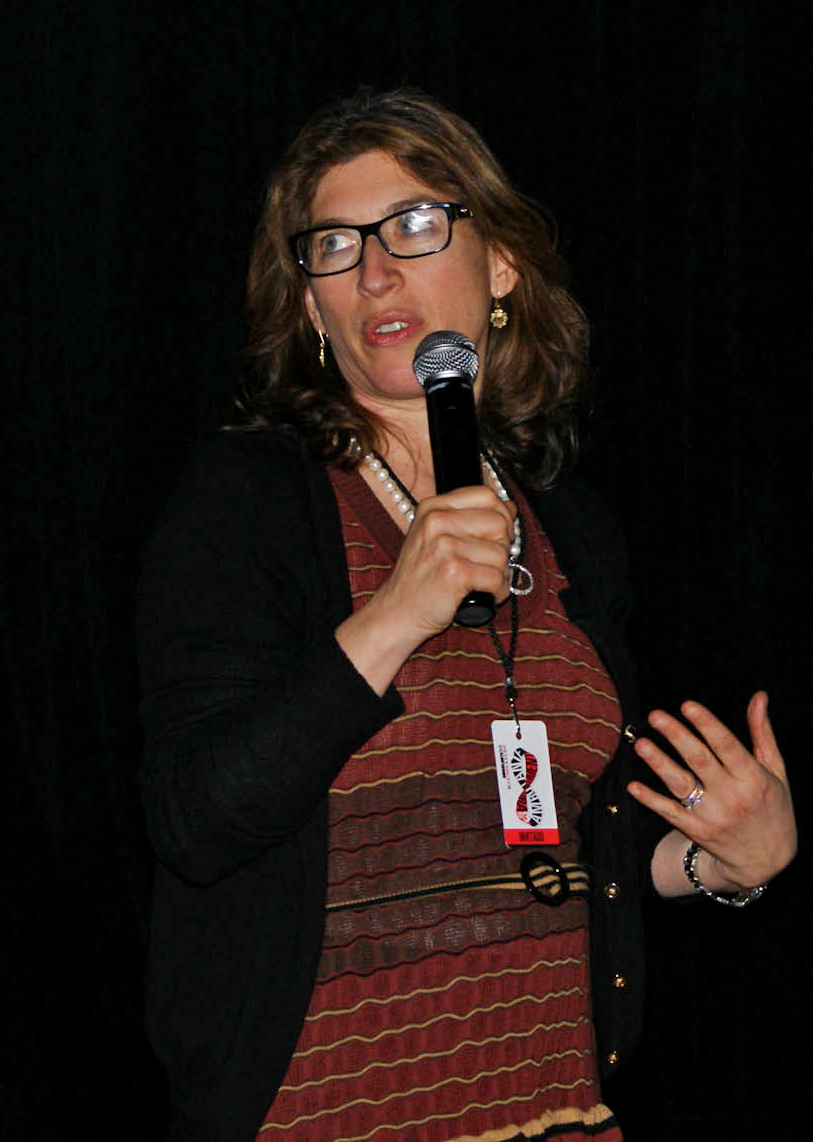
Lauren Greenfield, Breakthrough Nonfiction Series co-winner

=== Programs ===
Breakthrough Comedy Series: The Studio – Evan Goldberg, Alex Gregory, Peter Huyck, Frida Perez, Seth Rogen, creators; Josh Fagan, Evan Goldberg, Alex Gregory, Peter Huyck, Alex McAtee, Frida Perez Seth Rogen, James Weaver, executive producers (Apple TV+); #1 Happy Family USA – Pam Brady, Ramy Youssef, creators; Pam Brady, Andy Campagna, Mona Chalabi, Ravi Nandan, Josh Rabinowitz, Alli Reich, Hallie Sekoff, Ramy Youssef, executive producers (Amazon Prime Video); English Teacher – Brian Jordan Alvarez, creator; Brian Jordan Alvarez, Dave King, Jonathan Krisel, Paul Simms, executive producers (FX / Hulu); Fantasmas – Julio Torres, creator; Alex Bach, Olivia Gerke, Dave McCary, Daniel Powell, Emma Stone, Julio Torres, executive producers (HBO / Max); Overcompensating – Benito Skinner, creator; Josh Bachove, Matt Dines, Sam French, Alison Goodwin, Jonah Hill, Scott King, Daniel Gray Longino, Alli Reich, Benito Skinner, Charli XCX, executive producers (Amazon Prime Video)	Breakthrough Drama Series: The Pitt – R. Scott Gemmill, creator; Simran Baidwan, R. Scott Gemmill, Michael Hissrich, Erin Jontow, John Wells, Noah Wyle, executive producers (HBO / Max); Black Doves – Joe Barton, creator; Joe Barton, Jane Featherstone, Chris Fry, Keira Knightley, executive producers (Netflix); Forever – Mara Brock Akil, creator; Mara Brock Akil, Judy Blume, Susie Fitzgerald, Erika Harrison, Anthony Hemingway, Regina King, Reina King, Shana C. Waterman, Sara White, executive producers (Netflix); Matlock – Jennie Snyder Urman, creator; Kathy Bates, Kat Coiro, Joanna Klein, Eric Christian Olsen, Frank Siracusa, Jennifer Snyder Urman, John Weber, John Will, executive producers (CBS); One Hundred Years of Solitude – Josep Amorós, Gonzalo García Barcha, Carolina Caicedo, Andrés Calderón, Rodrigo García, Alex García López, Juliana Flórez Luna, Laura Mora, José Rivera, Diego Ramírez Schrempp, executive producers (Netflix)
Breakthrough Limited Series: Adolescence – Stephen Graham, Jack Thorne, creators; Philip Barantini, Emily Feller, Dede Gardner, Stephen Graham, Mark Herbert, Jeremy Kleiner, Brad Pitt, Jack Thorne, Hannah Walters, Nina Wolarsky, executive producers (Netflix); Dying for Sex – Kim Rosenstock, Elizabeth Meriwether, creators; Nikki Boyer, Kathy Ciric, Elizabeth Meriwether, Shannon Murphy, Katherine Pope, Kim Rosenstock, Michelle Williams, executive producers (FX / Hulu); Get Millie Black – Marlon James, creator; Marlon James, Leopoldo Gout, Simon Maxwell, Jami O'Brien, executive producers (HBO / Max); Penelope – Mark Duplass, Mel Eslyn, creators; Jay Duplass, Mark Duplass, Mel Eslyn, Shuli Harel, executive producers (Netflix); Say Nothing – Joshua Zetumer, creator; Nina Jacobson, Patrick Radden Keefe, Michael Lennox, Monica Levinson, Edward L. McDonnell, Brad Simpson, Joshua Zetumer, executive producers; (FX / Hulu)	Breakthrough Nonfiction Series: Social Studies – Lauren Greenfield, creator; Frank Evers, Lauren Greenfield, executive producers (FX / Hulu); Conbody vs Everybody – Debra Granik, creator; Joslyn Barnes, Debra Granik, Anne Rosellini, Diane Weyermann, executive producers; (Self-distributed); Hollywood Black – Justin Simien, creator; Nina Yang Bongiovi, Jill Burkhart, Shayla Harris, Jon Kamen, Amy Goodman Kass, Kyle Laursen, Stacey Reiss, Jeffrey Schwarz, Justin Simien, Dave Sirulnick, Forest Whitaker, Michael Wright, executive producers (MGM+); Omnivore – Cary Joji Fukunaga, Matt Goulding, René Redzepi, creators; Michael Antinoro, Matt Goulding, Ben Liebmann, Collin Orcutt, René Redzepi, Chris Rice, Max Wagner, Mateo Willis, executive producers (Apple TV+); Ren Faire – Nancy Abraham, Dani Bernfeld, Ronald Bronstein, Eli Bush, Lisa Heller, David Gauvey Herbert, Lance Oppenheim, Sara Rodriguez, Benny Safdie, Josh Safdie, executive producers (HBO / Max)
Outstanding Original Film, Broadcast, or Streaming: Pee-wee as Himself – Matt Wolf, director; Emma Tillinger Koskoff, producer (HBO / Max); Bridget Jones: Mad About the Boy – Michael Morris, director; Tim Bevan, Eric Fellner, Jo Wallett, producers (Peacock); Ladies & Gentlemen... 50 Years of SNL Music – Oz Rodriguez, Ahmir "Questlove" Thompson, directors; Oz Rodriguez, producer (Peacock); Rebel Ridge – Jeremy Saulnier, director; Neil Kopp, Jeremy Saulnier, Vincent Savino, Anish Savjani, producers (Netflix); Sly Lives! (aka The Burden of Black Genius) – Ahmir "Questlove" Thompson, director; Eric Macdonald, Derik Murray, Joseph Patel, Stephen Sawchuk, producers (Hulu)

=== Performance ===
Outstanding Lead Performance in a Comedy Series: Julio Torres – Fantasmas as Himself (HBO / Max); Ted Danson – A Man on the Inside as Charles Nieuwendyk (Netflix); Anna Lambe – North of North as Siaja (Netflix); Saagar Shaikh – Deli Boys as Raj Dar (Hulu); Benito Skinner – Overcompensating as Benny (Amazon Prime Video)	Outstanding Supporting Performance in a Comedy Series: Poorna Jagannathan – Deli Boys as Lucky (Hulu); Linda Lavin – Mid-Century Modern as Sybil Schneiderman (Hulu); Sean Patton – English Teacher as Markie Hillridge (FX / Hulu); Timothy Simons – Nobody Wants This as Sasha Roklov (Netflix); Chase Sui Wonders – The Studio as Quinn Hackett (Apple TV+)
Outstanding Lead Performance in a Drama Series: Kathy Bates – Matlock as Madeline "Matty" Matlock (CBS); Sterling K. Brown – Paradise as Xavier Collins (Hulu); Aldis Hodge – Cross as Alex Cross (Amazon Prime Video); Lovie Simone – Forever as Keisha Clark (Netflix); Noah Wyle – The Pitt as Dr. Michael "Robby" Robinavitch (HBO / Max)	Outstanding Supporting Performance in a Drama Series: Ben Whishaw – Black Doves as Sam Young (Netflix); Katherine LaNasa – The Pitt as Dana Evans (HBO / Max); James Marsden – Paradise as U.S. President Cal Bradford (Hulu); Skye P. Marshall – Matlock as Olympia Lawrence (CBS); Olivia Williams – Dune: Prophecy as Reverend Mother Tula Harkonnen (HBO / Max)
Outstanding Lead Performance in a Limited Series: Stephen Graham – Adolescence as Eddie Miller (Netflix); Brian Tyree Henry – Dope Thief as Ray Driscoll (Apple TV+); Cristin Milioti – The Penguin as Sofia Falcone (HBO / Max); Megan Stott – Penelope as Penelope (Netflix); Michelle Williams – Dying for Sex as Molly Kochan (FX / Hulu)	Outstanding Supporting Performance in a Limited Series: Owen Cooper – Adolescence as Jamie Miller (Netflix) (TIE); Jenny Slate – Dying for Sex as Nikki Boyer (FX / Hulu) (TIE); Erin Doherty – Adolescence as Briony Ariston (Netflix); Taraji P. Henson – Fight Night: The Million Dollar Heist as Vivian "Sweets" Thomas (Peacock); Diego Luna – La Maquina as Andronico "Andy" Lujan (Hulu)
Outstanding Performance in an Original Film: Aaron Pierre – Rebel Ridge as Terry Richmond (Netflix); Aunjanue Ellis-Taylor – The Supremes at Earl's All-You-Can-Eat as Odette (Searchlight Pictures / Hulu); Dylan O'Brien – Caddo Lake as Paris (HBO / Max); Phoebe-Rae Taylor – Out of My Mind as Melody Brooks (Disney+); Renée Zellweger – Bridget Jones: Mad About the Boy as Bridget Jones (Peacock)

== Special awards ==
=== Creator Tribute ===
- Hwang Dong-hyuk
- Amy Sherman-Palladino and Daniel Palladino – Étoile

=== Ensemble Tribute ===
- The Handmaid's Tale

=== Legend Tribute ===
- Parker Posey

=== Performer Tribute ===
- Brian Tyree Henry – Dope Thief

=== Sidney Poitier Icon Tribute ===
- Sheryl Lee Ralph

=== Visionary Tribute ===
- David E. Kelley

== See also ==
- 41st TCA Awards
- 5th Astra TV Awards
- 77th Primetime Emmy Awards
