= Critics' Choice Television Award for Best Supporting Actor in a Movie/Miniseries =

Television award

Critics' Choice Television Award for Best Supporting Actor in a Limited Series or Movie Made for Television
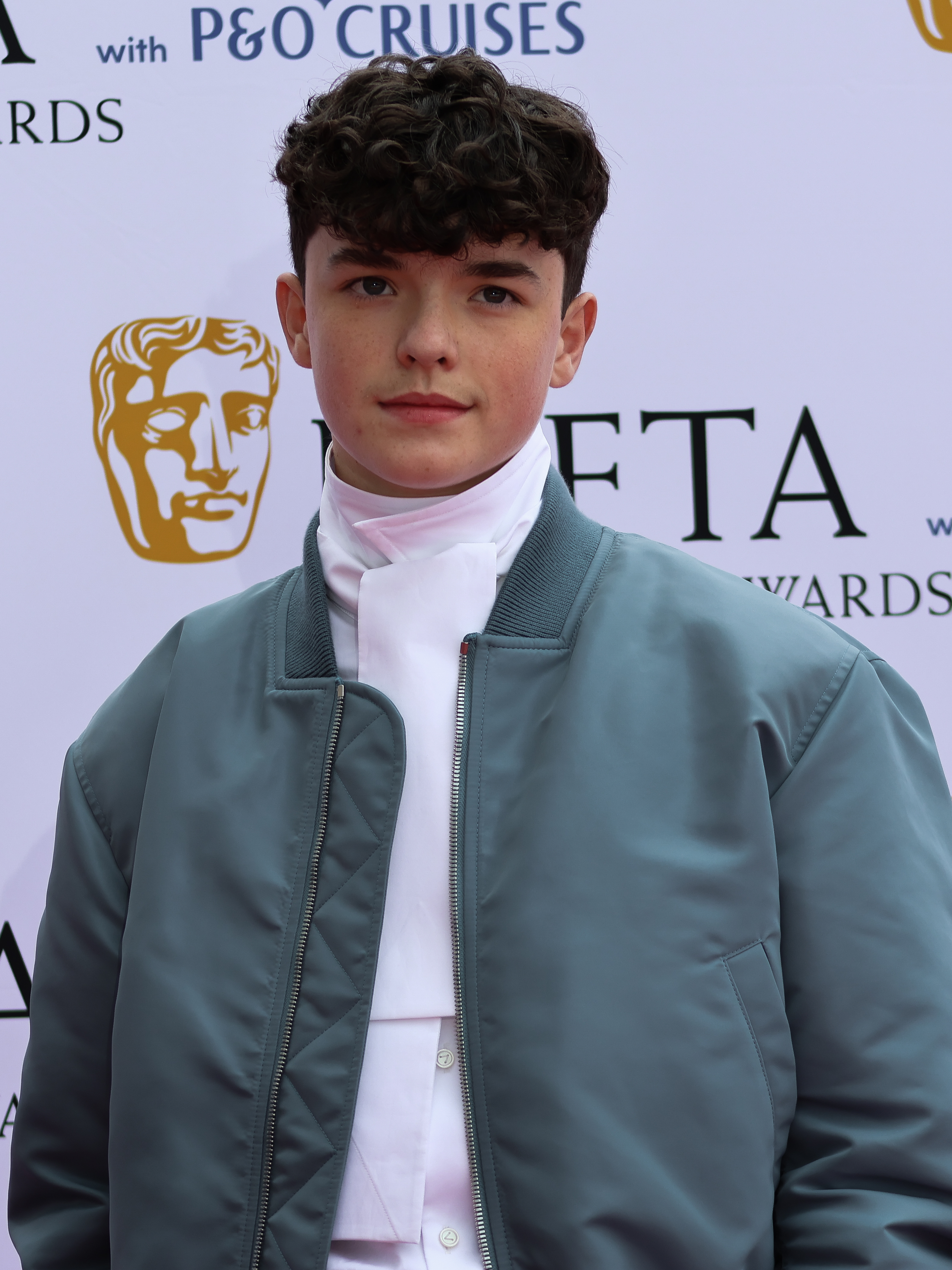
- The 2026 recipient: Owen Cooper
- Country: United States
- Presented by: Critics Choice Association
- First award: 2013
- Currently held by: Owen Cooper – Adolescence (2025)
- Website: criticschoice.com

The Critics' Choice Television Award for Best Supporting Actor in a Limited Series or Movie Made for Television is one of the award categories presented annually by the Critics' Choice Awards (CCA) to recognize the work done by television actors in a supporting role.

The award was introduced in 2013 and the winners are selected by a group of critics that are part of the Critics Choice Association.

Jesse Plemons holds the record with most nominations in this category with three. He was nominated for Fargo (2016), which he won for, and El Camino: A Breaking Bad Movie (2020) and Love & Death (2024).

The current winner in this category is Owen Cooper for Adolescence (2025).

== History ==
It was introduced in 2013. The losers are selected by a group of television critics that are part of the Broadcast Television Critics Association.

== Winners and nominees ==
indicates the winner

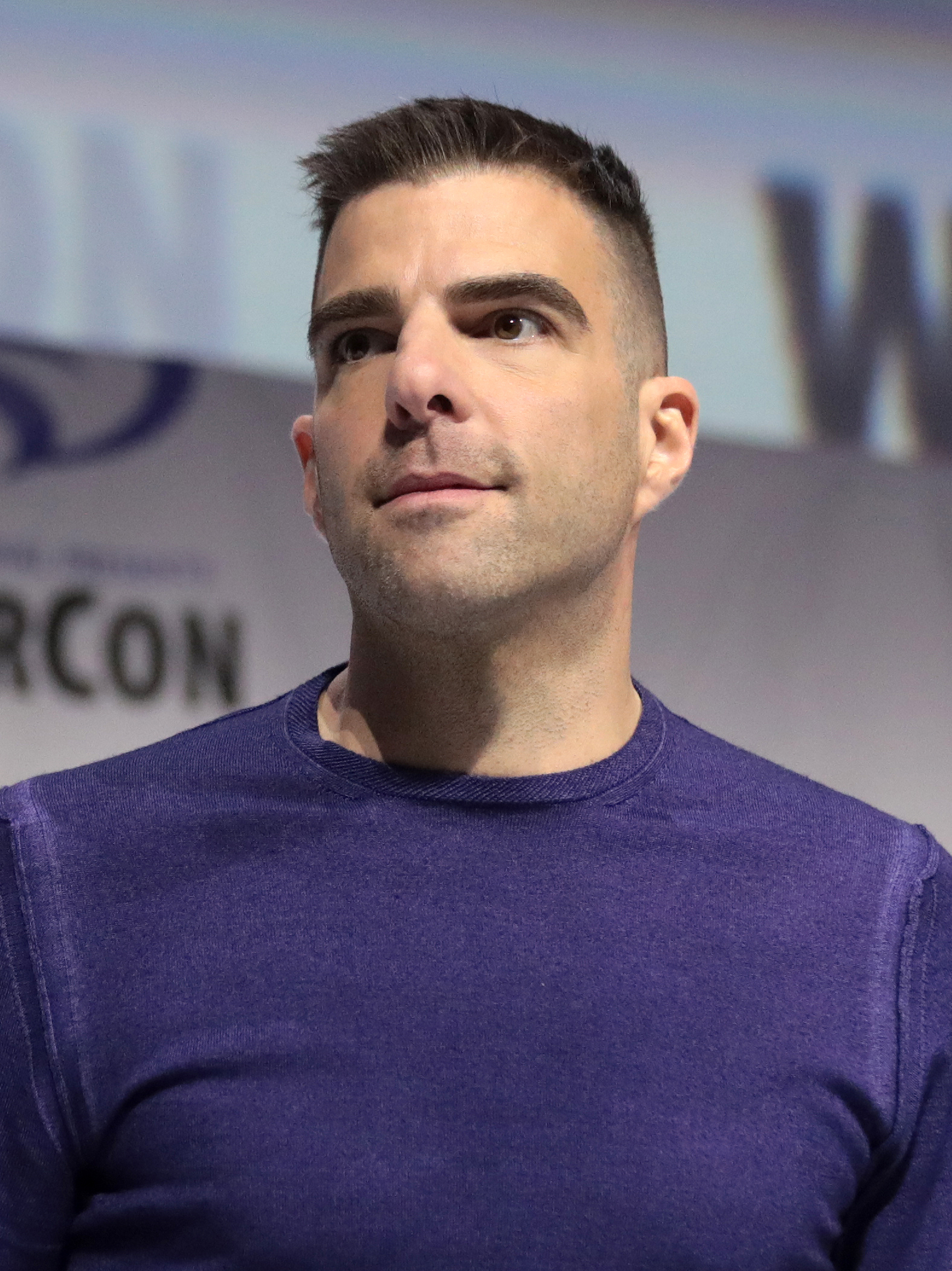
Zachary Quinto won for American Horror Story: Asylum (2013)

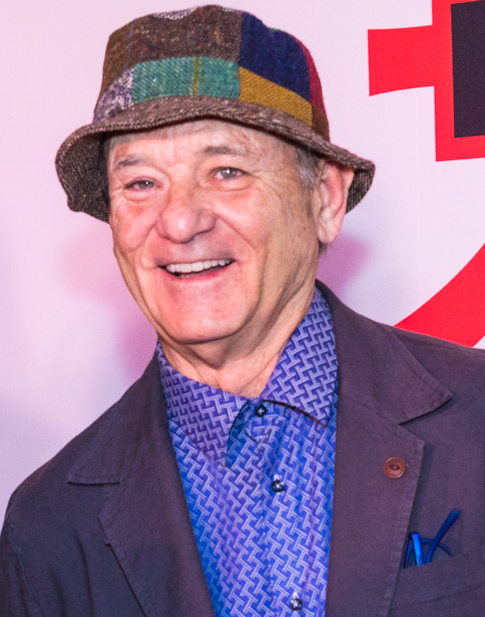
Bill Murray won for Olive Kitteridge (2015)

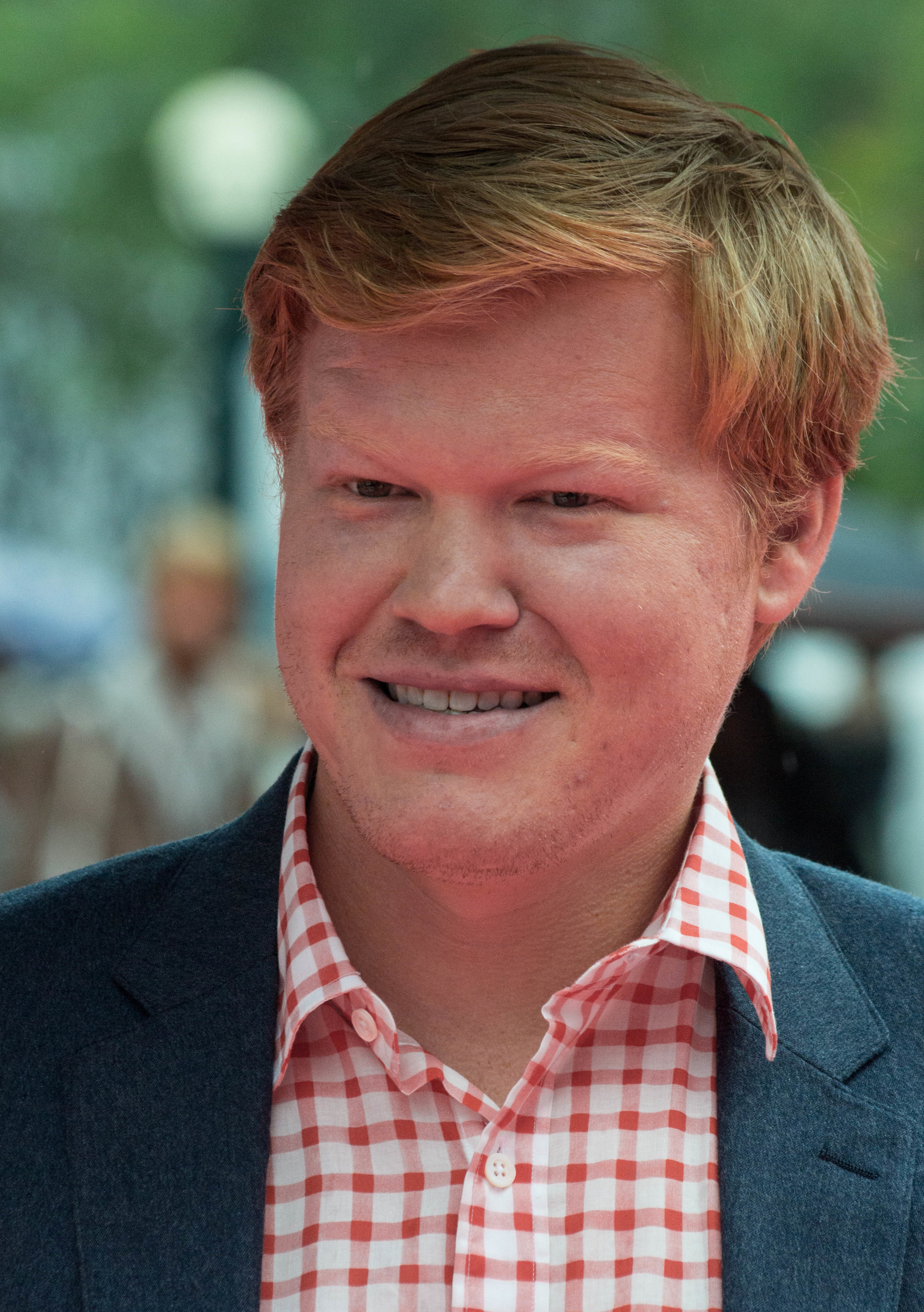
Jesse Plemons won for Fargo (2016)

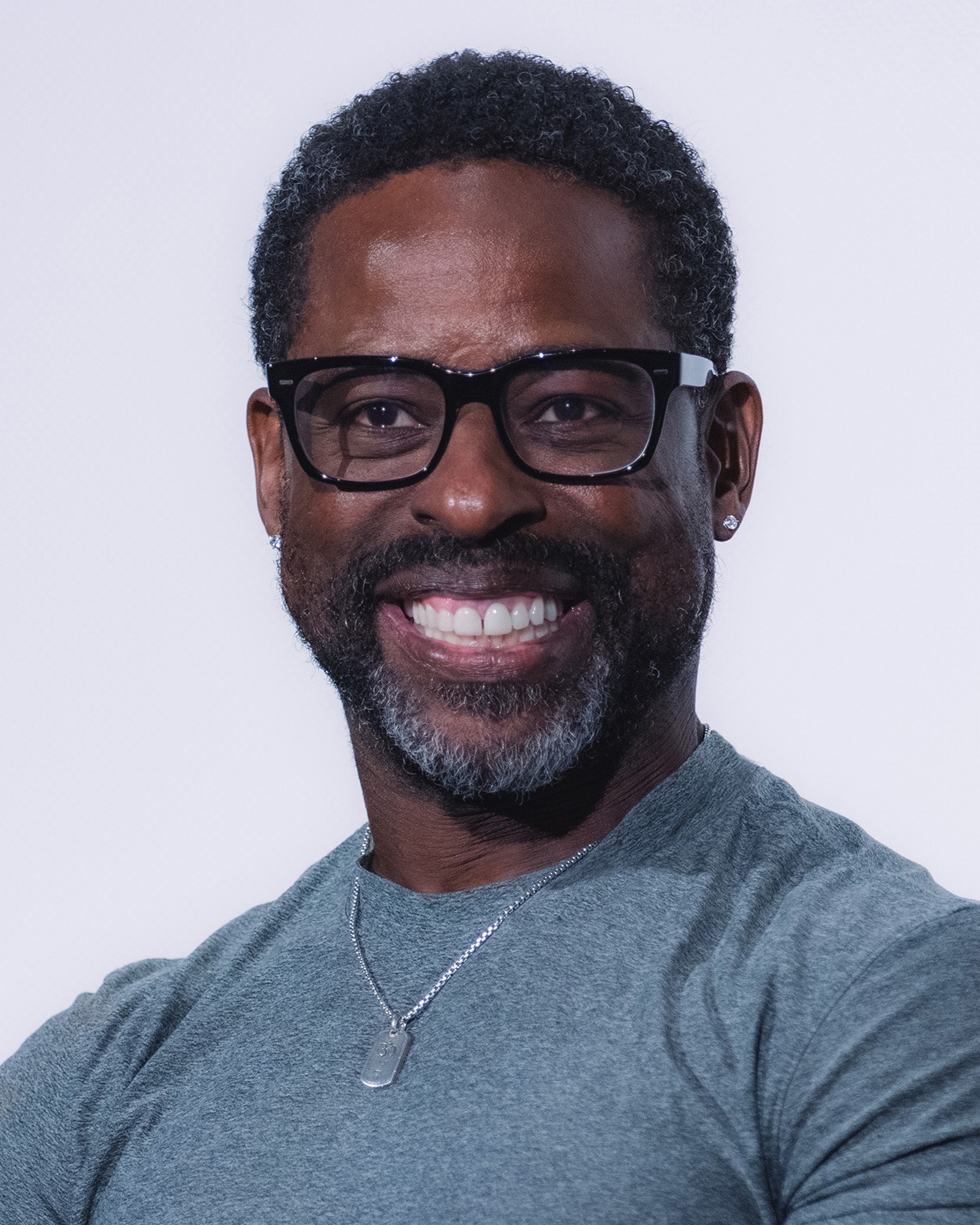
Sterling K. Brown won for The People v. O. J. Simpson: American Crime Story (2016)

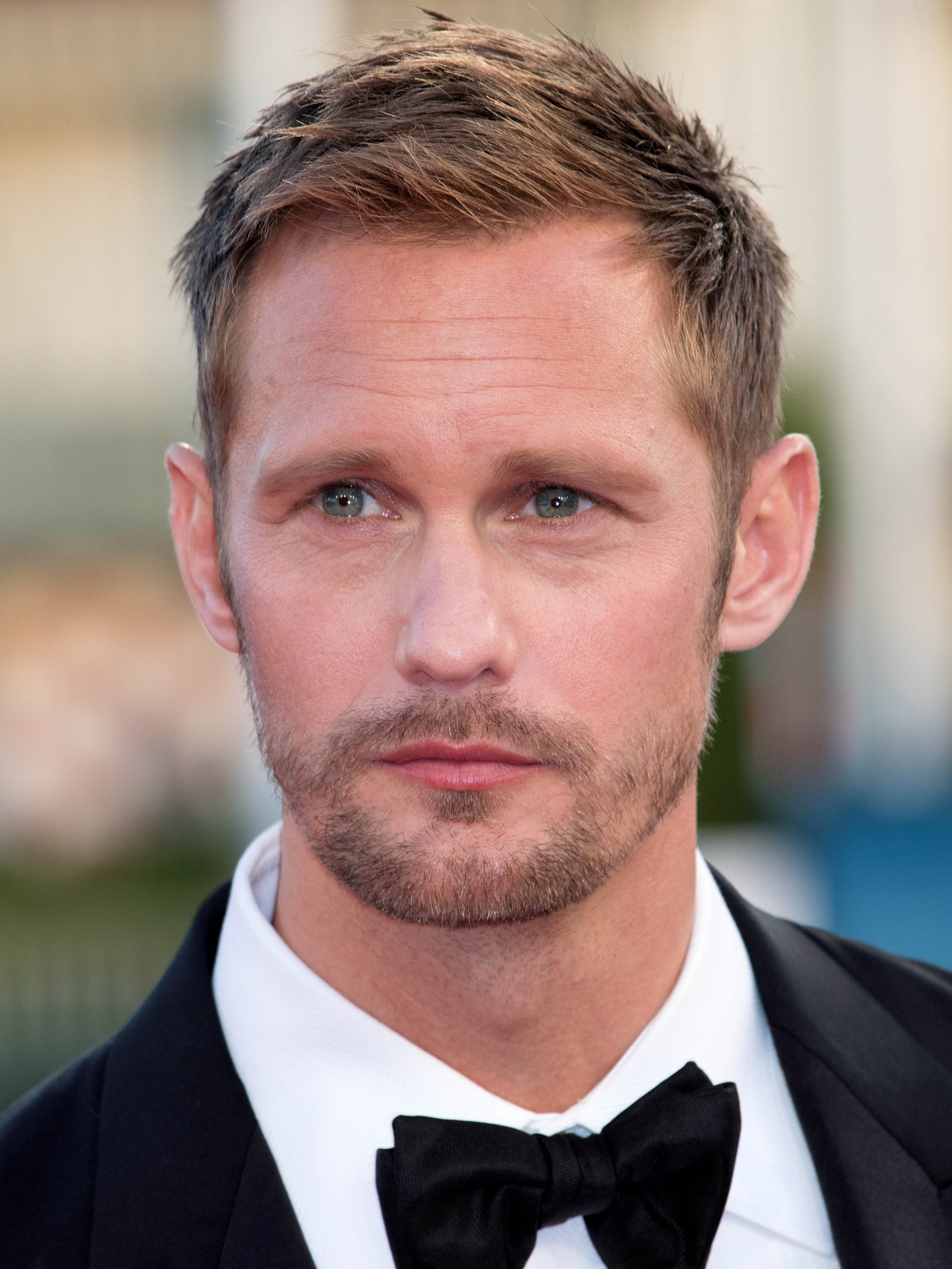
Alexander Skarsgård won for Big Little Lies (2018)

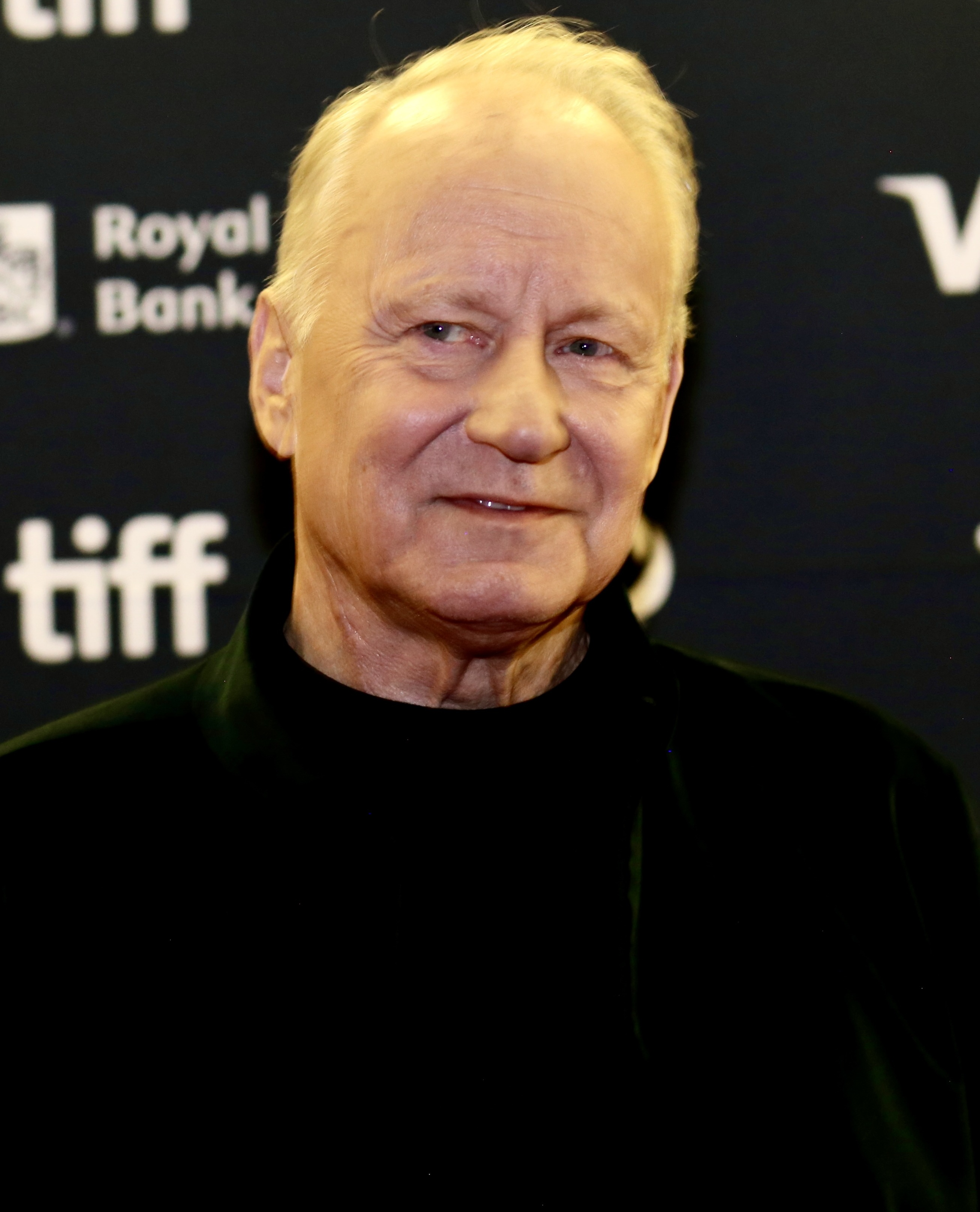
Stellan Skarsgård won for Chernobyl (2020)

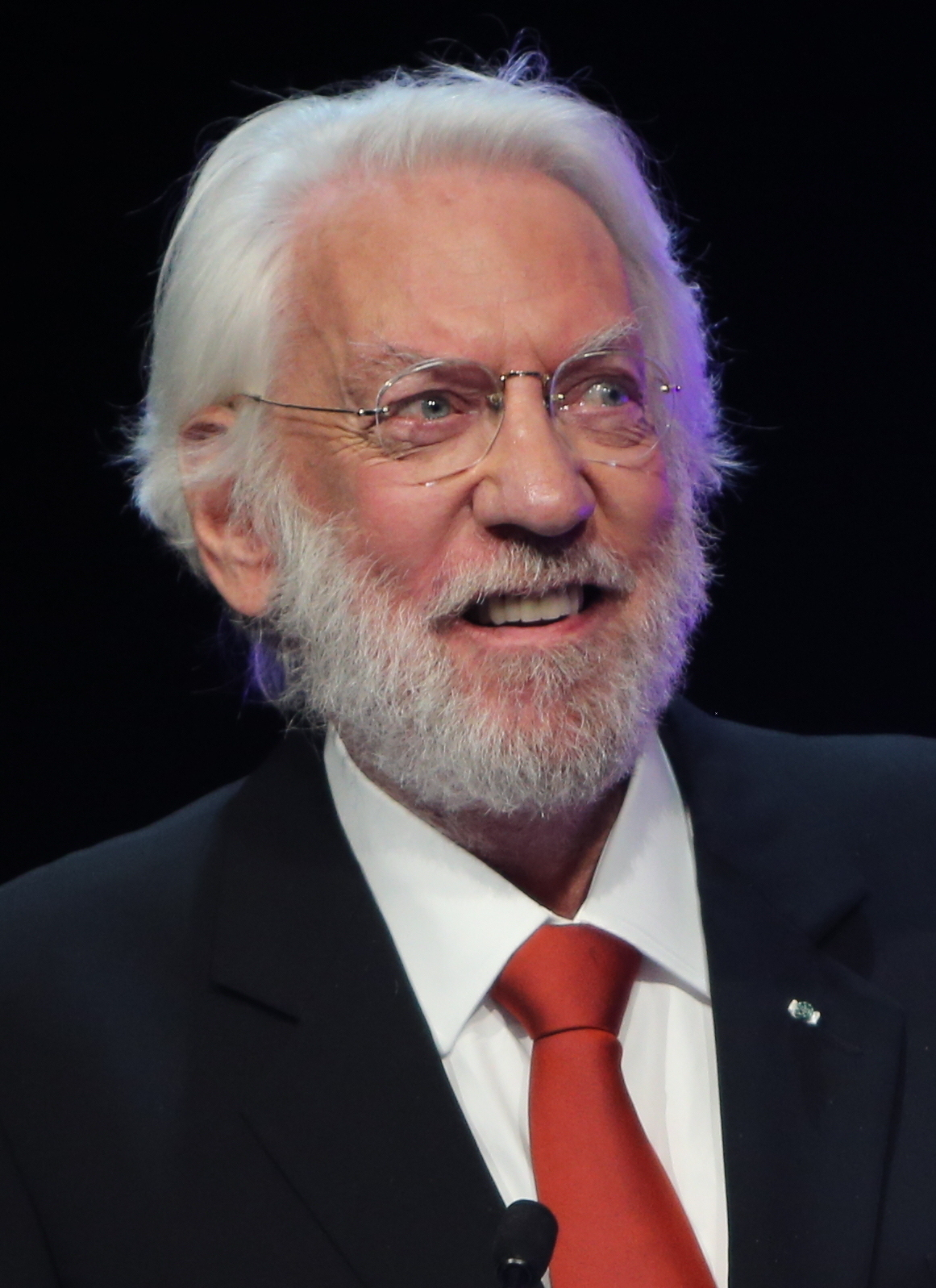
Donald Sutherland won for The Undoing (2021)

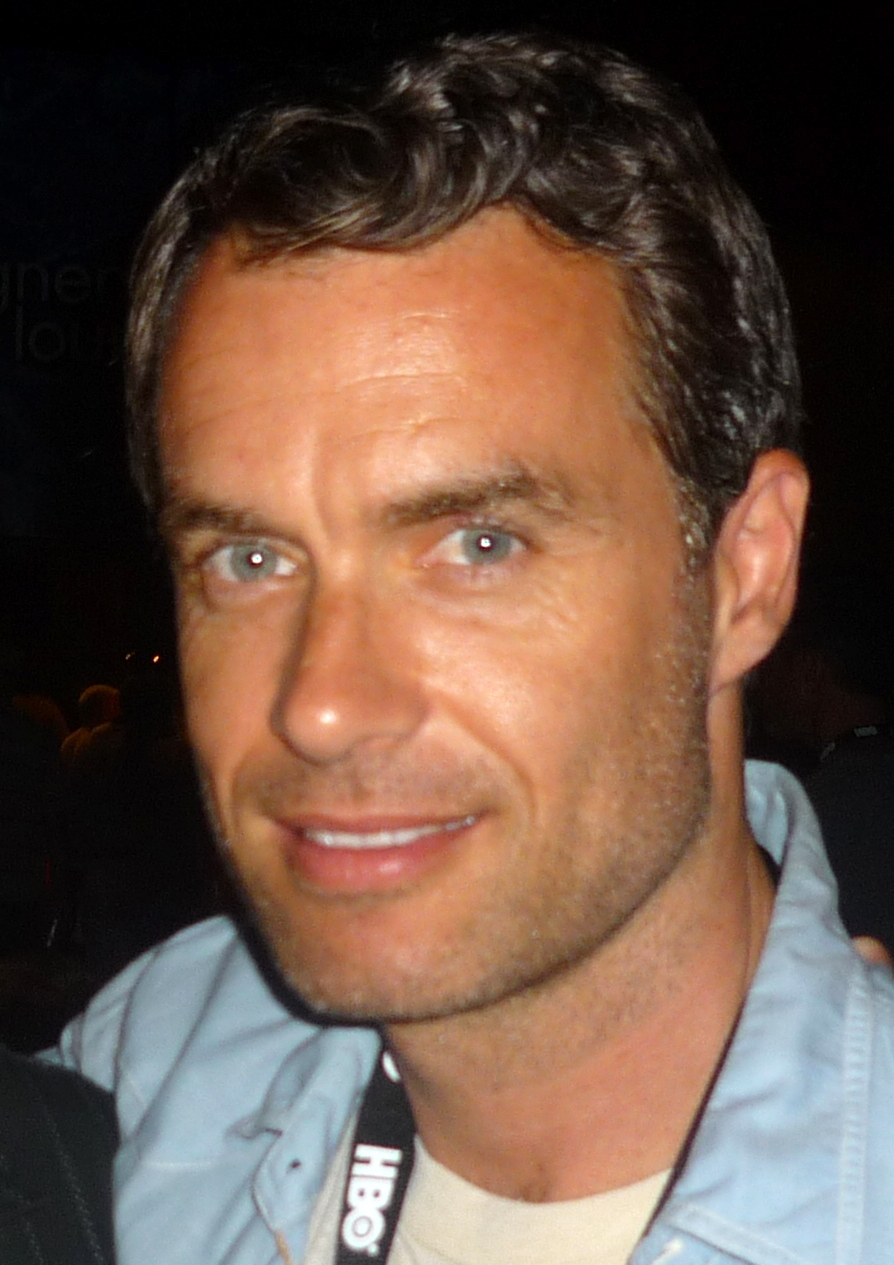
Murray Bartlett won for The White Lotus (2022)

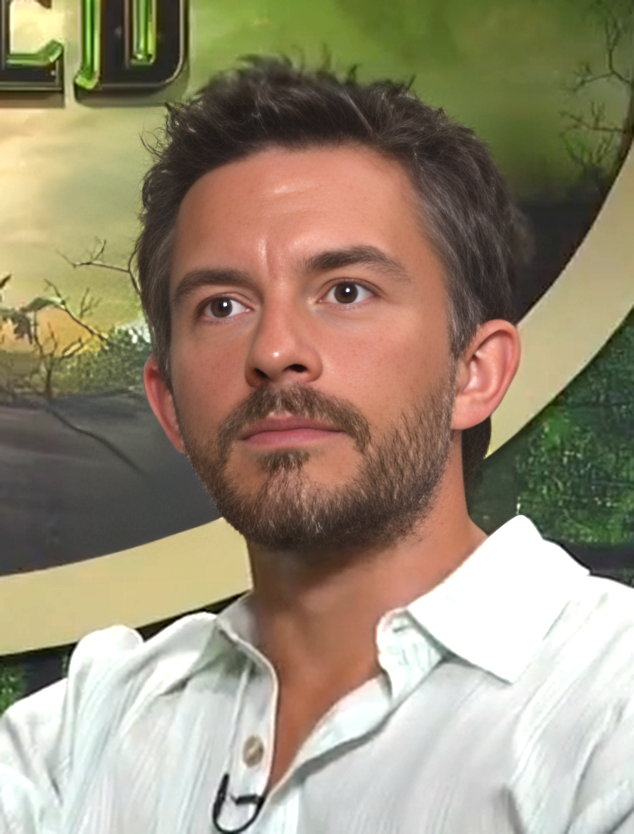
Jonathan Bailey won for Fellow Travelers (2023)

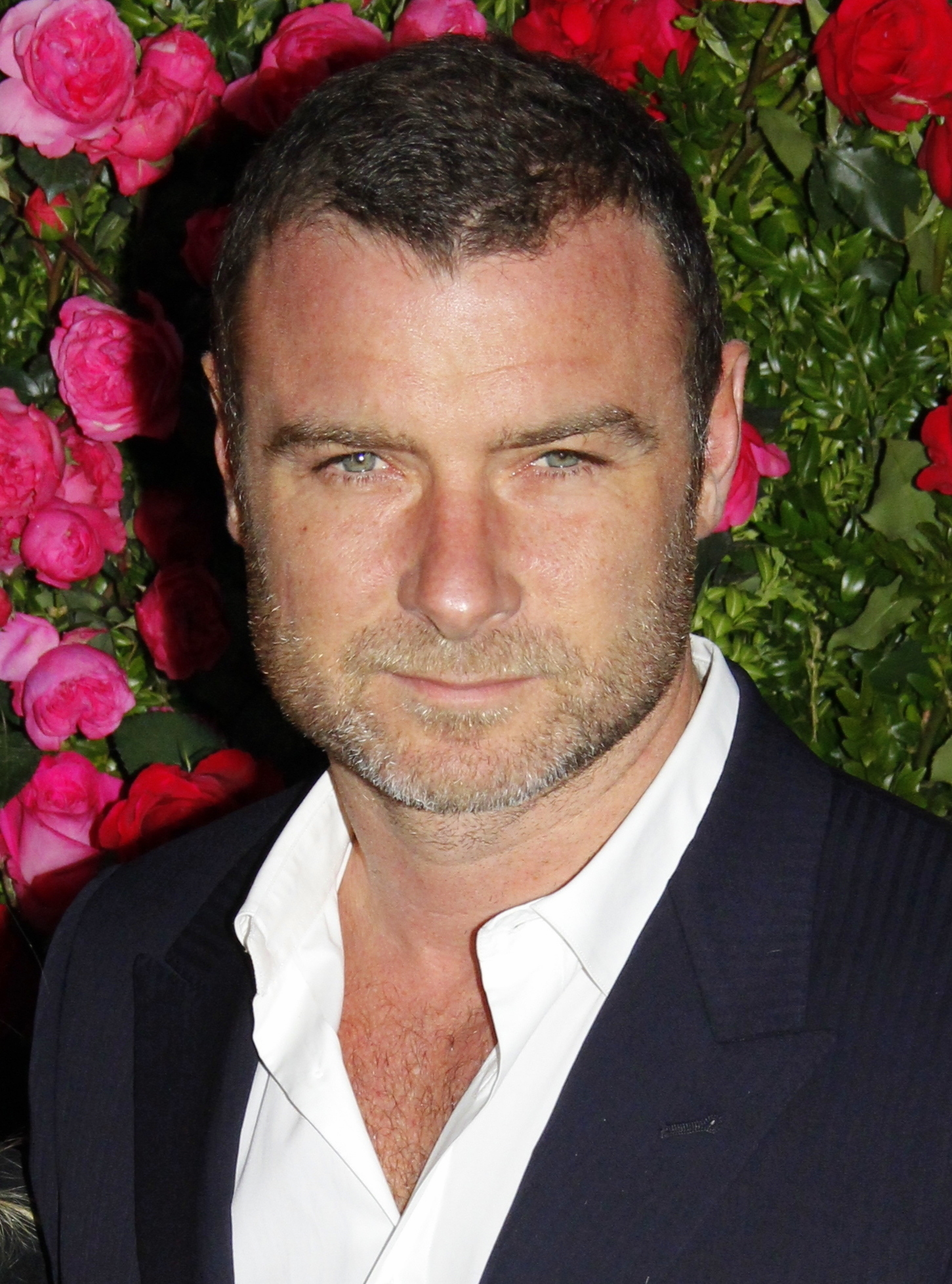
Liev Schreiber won for The Perfect Couple (2025)

=== 2010s ===
Year	Actor	Role	Program	Network
2013	Zachary Quinto	American Horror Story: Asylum	Dr. Oliver Thredson	FX
2013	Peter Mullan	Top of the Lake	Matt Mitcham	Sundance Channel
2013	David Wenham	Top of the Lake	Det. Al Parker	Sundance Channel
2013	Tom Wright	Top of the Lake	Johnno Mitcham	Sundance Channel
2013	James Cromwell	American Horror Story: Asylum	Dr. Arthur Arden / Hans Grüper	FX
2013	Sebastian Stan	Political Animals	Thomas "T.J." Hammond	USA
2014	Matt Bomer	The Normal Heart	Felix Turner	HBO
2014	Warren Brown	Luther	Justin Ripley	BBC America
2014	Martin Freeman	Sherlock: His Last Vow	Dr. John Watson	BBC America
2014	Colin Hanks	Fargo	Officer Gus Grimly	FX
2014	Joe Mantello	The Normal Heart	Mickey Marcus	HBO
2014	Blair Underwood	The Trip to Bountiful	Ludie Watts	Lifetime
2015	Bill Murray	Olive Kitteridge	Jack Kennison	HBO
2015	Jason Isaacs	Stockholm, Pennsylvania	Ben McKay	Lifetime
2015	Elvis Nolasco	American Crime	Carter Nix	ABC
2015	Jonathan Pryce	Wolf Hall	Thomas Wolsey	PBS
2015	Cory Michael Smith	Olive Kitteridge	Kevin Coulson	HBO
2015	Finn Wittrock	American Horror Story: Freak Show	Dandy Mott	FX
2016 (1)	Jesse Plemons	Fargo	Ed Blumquist	FX
2016 (1)	David Alan Grier	The Wiz Live!	Cowardly Lion / Farmhand #2	NBC
2016 (1)	Ne-Yo	The Wiz Live!	Tin Man / Farmhand #1	NBC
2016 (1)	Nick Offerman	Fargo	Karl Weathers	FX
2016 (1)	Bokeem Woodbine	Fargo	Mike Milligan	FX
2016 (1)	Raoul Trujillo	Saints & Strangers	Massasoit	Nat Geo
2016 (2)	Sterling K. Brown	The People v. O. J. Simpson: American Crime Story	Christopher Darden	FX
2016 (2)	Lane Garrison	Roots	Frederick Murray	History
2016 (2)	Forest Whitaker	Roots	Henry (Fiddler)	History
2016 (2)	Frank Langella	All the Way	Richard Russell Jr.	HBO
2016 (2)	Hugh Laurie	The Night Manager	Richard Onslow Roper	AMC
2016 (2)	John Travolta	The People v. O. J. Simpson: American Crime Story	Robert Shapiro	FX
2018	Alexander Skarsgård	Big Little Lies	Perry Wright	HBO
2018	Johnny Flynn	Genius	Young Albert Einstein	NatGeo
2018	Benito Martinez	American Crime	Luis Salazar	ABC
2018	Alfred Molina	Feud: Bette and Joan	Robert Aldrich	FX
2018	Stanley Tucci	Feud: Bette and Joan	Jack L. Warner	FX
2018	David Thewlis	Fargo	V.M. Varga	FX
2019	Ben Whishaw	A Very English Scandal	Norman Josiffe	Prime Video
2019	Brandon Victor Dixon	Jesus Christ Superstar Live in Concert	Judas Iscariot	NBC
2019	Eric Lange	Escape at Dannemora	Lyle Mitchell	Showtime
2019	Alex Rich	Genius: Picasso	Young Pablo Picasso	NatGeo
2019	Peter Sarsgaard	The Looming Tower	Martin Schmidt	Prime Video
2019	Finn Wittrock	The Assassination of Gianni Versace: American Crime Story	Jeff Trail	FX

=== 2020s ===
Year	Actor	Role	Program	Network
2020	Stellan Skarsgård	Chernobyl	Boris Shcherbina	HBO
2020	Asante Blackk	When They See Us	Kevin Richardson	Netflix
2020	John Leguizamo	When They See Us	Raymond Santana Sr.	Netflix
2020	Jesse Plemons	El Camino: A Breaking Bad Movie	Todd Alquist	Netflix
2020	Russell Tovey	Years and Years	Daniel Lyons	HBO
2020	George Clooney	Catch-22	Scheisskopf	Hulu
2020	Dev Patel	Modern Love	Joshua	Prime Video
2021	Donald Sutherland	The Undoing	Franklin Reinhardt	HBO
2021	Daveed Diggs	The Good Lord Bird	Frederick Douglass	Showtime
2021	Joshua Caleb Johnson	The Good Lord Bird	Henry "Onion" Shackleford	Showtime
2021	Dylan McDermott	Hollywood	Ernest "Ernie" West	Netflix
2021	Glynn Turman	Fargo	Doctor Senator	FX
2021	John Turturro	The Plot Against America	Rabbi Lionel Bengelsdorf	HBO
2022	Murray Bartlett	The White Lotus	Armond	HBO
2022	Zach Gilford	Midnight Mass	Riley Flynn	Netflix
2022	William Jackson Harper	The Underground Railroad	Royal	Prime Video
2022	Evan Peters	Mare of Easttown	Detective Colin Zabel	HBO
2022	Christian Slater	Dr. Death	Randall Kirby	Peacock
2022	Courtney B. Vance	Genius: Aretha	C. L. Franklin	NatGeo
2023
2023	Paul Walter Hauser	Black Bird	Larry Hall	Apple TV+
2023	Murray Bartlett	Welcome to Chippendales	Nick De Noia	Hulu
2023	Domhnall Gleeson	The Patient	Sam Fortner	FX
2023	Matthew Goode	The Offer	Robert Evans	Paramount+
2023	Ray Liotta (posthumous)	Black Bird	James "Big Jim" Keene	Apple TV+
2023	Shea Whigham	Gaslit	G. Gordon Liddy	Starz
2024
2024	Jonathan Bailey	Fellow Travelers	Timothy "Tim" Laughlin	Showtime
2024	Taylor Kitsch	Painkiller	Glen Kryger	Netflix
2024	Jesse Plemons	Love & Death	Allan Gore	HBO Max
2024	Lewis Pullman	Lessons in Chemistry	Dr. Calvin Evans	Apple TV+
2024	Liev Schreiber	A Small Light	Otto Frank	National Geographic
2024	Justin Theroux	White House Plumbers	G. Gordon Liddy	HBO Max
2025
2025	Liev Schreiber	The Perfect Couple	Tag Winbury	Netflix
2025	Robert Downey Jr.	The Sympathizer	Claude / Robert Hammer / Ned Godwin / Niko Damianos / The Priest	HBO / Max
2025	Hugh Grant	The Regime	Edward Keplinger	HBO / Max
2025	Ron Cephas Jones (posthumous)	Genius: MLK/X	Elijah Muhammad	National Geographic
2025	Logan Lerman	We Were the Lucky Ones	Addy Kurc	Hulu
2025	Treat Williams (posthumous)	Feud: Capote vs. The Swans	William "Bill" Paley	FX
2026
2026	Owen Cooper	Adolescence	Jamie Miller	Netflix
2026	Wagner Moura	Dope Thief	Manny Carvalho	Apple Tv+
2026	Nick Offerman	Death by Lightning	Chester A. Arthur	Netflix
2026	Michael Peña	All Her Fault	Detective Jim Alcaras	Peacock
2026	Ashley Walters	Adolescence	DI Luke Bascombe	Netflix
2026	Ramy Youssef	Mountainhead	Jeffrey "Jeff" Abredazi	HBO Max

== Multiple wins and nominations ==
=== Nominations ===
3 nominations

- Jesse Plemons

2 nominations

- Murray Bartlett
- Nick Offerman
- Liev Schreiber
- Finn Wittrock

== See also ==
- Golden Globe Award for Best Supporting Actor – Series, Miniseries or Television Film
- Primetime Emmy Award for Outstanding Supporting Actor in a Limited or Anthology Series or Movie
