= Nina Wolarsky =

American producer and media executive

- Education: University of Pennsylvania
- Occupation: Producer
- Years active: 2003–present
- Employer: Plan B Entertainment

Nina Wolarsky is an American film and television producer and media executive.

== Biography ==
Wolarsky attended the University of Pennsylvania, graduating in 1997. She worked as a senior VP of development at Smokehouse Pictures, where she executive produced George Clooney's The Ides of March (2011) and Ben Affleck's Argo (2012). In 2012, she left Smokehouse and joined Netflix to oversee production and development of the platform's original series. She later departed Netflix in 2020. In 2023, she joined Plan B Entertainment as the company's President of Television.

== Filmography ==
=== Film ===
Year	Title	Notes	Ref.
2004	P.S.	Associate producer	
2006	The Night Listener	Associate producer	
2007	Evening	Co-producer	
2008	Revolutionary Road	Co-executive producer	
2011	The Ides of March	Executive producer	
2012	Argo	Executive producer	

=== Television ===
Year	Title	Notes	Ref.
2016	The Crown	10 episodes; executive producer	
2016	The OA	8 episodes; executive producer	
2025	Adolescence	4 episodes; executive producer	

== Awards and nominations ==
Award	Year	Category	Nominated work	Result	Ref.
Film Independent Spirit Awards	2026	Best New Scripted Series	Adolescence	Won	
Gotham TV Awards	2025	Breakthrough Limited Series	Adolescence	Won	
Primetime Emmy Awards	2025	Outstanding Limited or Anthology Series	Adolescence	Won	
Producers Guild of America Awards	2026	Outstanding Producer of Limited or Anthology Series Television	Adolescence	Won	
