= Adolescence (TV series) =

2025 crime drama TV series

- Promotional poster
- Genre: Crime drama; Psychological drama
- Created by: Jack Thorne; Stephen Graham
- Written by: Jack Thorne; Stephen Graham
- Directed by: Philip Barantini
- Starring: Stephen Graham; Ashley Walters; Faye Marsay; Mark Stanley; Christine Tremarco; Owen Cooper; Amélie Pease; Hannah Walters; Jo Hartley; Fatima Bojang; Kaine Davis; Amari Bacchus; Erin Doherty
- Composers: Aaron May; David Ridley
- Countries of origin: United Kingdom; United States
- Original language: English
- No. of episodes: 4

Production
- Executive producers: Jack Thorne; Philip Barantini; Brad Pitt; Jeremy Kleiner; Dede Gardner; Nina Wolarsky; Hannah Walters; Stephen Graham; Mark Herbert; Emily Feller
- Producer: Jo Johnson
- Cinematography: Matthew Lewis
- Running time: 51–65 minutes
- Production companies: Warp Films; It's All Made Up Productions; Matriarch Productions; Plan B Entertainment; One Shoe Films

Original release
- Network: Netflix
- Release: 13 March 2025

Adolescence is a psychological crime drama television series created by Jack Thorne and Stephen Graham, and directed by Philip Barantini. It centres on a 13-year-old schoolboy, Jamie Miller (Owen Cooper), who is arrested after the murder of a girl in his school. Every episode was shot in one continuous take. (Note: Attributed to multiple references:)

The entire series premiered on 13 March 2025 on Netflix, to critical acclaim for its directing, writing and cinematography, with special attention paid to its atmosphere and performances. Adolescence was the first streaming series to place at the top of the Barb Audiences weekly television ratings, and received thirteen nominations at the 77th Primetime Emmy Awards, winning nine, including Outstanding Limited or Anthology Series, Outstanding Directing for a Limited or Anthology Series or Movie for Barantini, and Outstanding Writing for a Limited or Anthology Series or Movie for Thorne and Graham, in addition to acting wins for Lead Actor (Graham), Supporting Actor (Cooper), and Supporting Actress (Erin Doherty).

In April 2025, Deadline Hollywood reported that Netflix and Plan B Entertainment were in talks about developing a second season.

== Plot ==
In a town near Doncaster, South Yorkshire, armed police raid a family home and arrest 13-year-old Jamie Miller on suspicion of the murder of his classmate, Katie Leonard, who had her nude photos leaked and rejected his romantic advances. Jamie is held at a police station for questioning and then remanded in custody at a secure training centre. Investigations at Jamie's school and interviews by a forensic psychologist uncover his manosphere-influenced views on women and the cyberbullying he has received on social media. At home, his family deals with community backlash as they work together to cope with his arrest.

== Cast and characters ==
=== Main ===
- Stephen Graham as Eddie Miller
- Ashley Walters as DI Luke Bascombe
- Faye Marsay as DS Misha Frank
- Mark Stanley as Paul Barlow
- Christine Tremarco as Manda Miller
- Owen Cooper as Jamie Miller
- Amélie Pease as Lisa Miller
- Hannah Walters as Mrs Bailey
- Jo Hartley as Mrs Fenumore
- Fatima Bojang as Jade
- Kaine Davis as Ryan Kowalska
- Amari Bacchus as Adam Bascombe
- Erin Doherty as Briony Ariston

=== Guest ===
- Emilia Holliday as Katie Leonard
- Lewis Pemberton as Tommy
- Austin Haynes as Fredo
- Adam Khan as Tau
- Charlie McSweeney as Shaun
- Alfie Ward as Moray
- Elodie Grace Walker as Georgie
- Amelia Minto as Billie
- Douglas Russell as Victor
- Connor Calland as Evan

== Episodes ==
No.	Title	Directed by	Written by	Original release date
1	"Episode 1"	Philip Barantini	Jack Thorne & Stephen Graham	13 March 2025
On the morning of 8 May 2024, Detective Inspector Luke Bascombe and Detective Sergeant Misha Frank lead a police raid at the home of the Miller family: father Eddie, mother Manda, daughter Lisa, and 13-year-old son Jamie. They arrest Jamie on suspicion of murder and take him to the nearby police station. A tearful Jamie professes his innocence as he is processed and taken to a detention cell while his family arrives at the station. Eddie agrees to be Jamie's "appropriate adult" and accompany him as he is searched and questioned. Eddie privately asks Jamie whether he has committed the crime and believes his denial. Barlow, the solicitor appointed to represent Jamie, arrives and advises Jamie not to respond to questions about the previous night. During Jamie's formal interview, Bascombe and Frank reveal that Jamie has made several sexually explicit comments about female models on Instagram. He is then questioned about his classmate Katie Leonard, whose murdered body was found in a car park the night before. Bascombe plays CCTV footage of Jamie stabbing Katie to death before terminating the interview. Jamie and Eddie weep in the interrogation room. Eddie briefly recoils when Jamie touches him before they tightly embrace.
2	"Episode 2"	Philip Barantini	Jack Thorne & Stephen Graham	13 March 2025
Three days after the murder, Bascombe and Frank visit Jamie's secondary school to speak to Jamie and Katie's classmates, hoping to learn Jamie's motive and the location of the murder weapon. Katie's best friend, Jade, is distraught by the murder and sardonically insults the officers. She later assaults Jamie's friend Ryan during a fire drill, accusing him of getting Katie killed. When Bascombe and Frank interview Ryan, he is initially cooperative but soon turns evasive, leaving the room when the murder weapon is mentioned. Bascombe's estranged son, Adam, a student at the school, informs his father that Katie replied to Jamie's Instagram comments of models using emoji language to accuse him of being an incel, and Bascombe wonders if there was a cyberbullying campaign against Jamie. As Bascombe and Frank attempt to question Ryan again, he flees through a window, and Bascombe chases him out of the school. When Ryan is caught, he reveals that the knife belonged to him; he and another friend, Tommy, had given Jamie the knife, thinking he would use it to intimidate Katie into retracting the Instagram replies. Ryan is arrested for conspiracy to murder. Back at the school, Bascombe meets up with Adam and asks to spend time with him. Adam agrees and they leave the school together. Meanwhile, Eddie visits the site of Katie's murder to leave flowers in respect.
3	"Episode 3"	Philip Barantini	Jack Thorne & Stephen Graham	13 March 2025
Seven months after the murder, forensic psychologist Briony Ariston meets with Jamie at a secure training centre to prepare a pre-trial report on his mental capacity. Briony assures Jamie that her only goal is to evaluate his understanding of the circumstances surrounding the case, not the case itself. Jamie, however, engages in a tenuously gripped game of one-upmanship. Briony questions Jamie about his attitude towards masculinity, women, and himself. Briony recalls that Jamie had said he and his friends had been bullied at school. Jamie recounts that Katie had sent a topless photo to a classmate she was attracted to and that the classmate spread it around the school without her consent. This hurt Katie, which tempted Jamie to ask Katie out, believing she would be more likely to accept him in an emotionally vulnerable state. She rebuffed him and proceeded to cyberbully him by leaving insulting comments on his Instagram page. Throughout the interview, Jamie's mood fluctuates between friendly and aggressive. This includes several outbursts of anger, the confession that he was tempted to grope Katie during the confrontation and that he borrowed the knife to threaten her. After Briony informs Jamie that this session is their last, he demands to know if she likes him personally, but she refuses to answer, further agitating Jamie. The security guard is forced to drag Jamie out of the interview room. Alone, Briony is visibly distressed.
4	"Episode 4"	Philip Barantini	Jack Thorne & Stephen Graham	13 March 2025
One year after the murder, the Millers have made attempts to return to normality as Jamie awaits trial. On Eddie's 50th birthday, his van is spray-painted by teenagers who attend Jamie's school. Eddie plans to take Manda and Lisa to the cinema later that day to lighten the mood, but they first go to a hardware store to buy something to remove the paint from the van. There, Eddie is further distressed by an employee recognising him and awkwardly expressing support for Jamie. Eddie buys some paint to recoat the van. Outside, he spots the teens who tagged the van and angrily threatens them before throwing the contents of the can of paint on his van out of anger. On the drive home, Jamie calls and announces his plan to plead guilty. At the house, Eddie and Manda come to terms with Jamie's predicament, blaming themselves for not paying attention to his online radicalisation. Lisa joins them, expressing support for Eddie's decision not to move the family, knowing their connection to Jamie would eventually catch up with them. They decide instead to rent a film and order Chinese food to turn the day around, with Manda and Lisa leaving to prepare breakfast. Alone, Eddie breaks down on Jamie's bed. He tucks in a teddy bear, kisses its head, and apologises to Jamie for not doing better as a father, before joining his family.

== Production ==
=== Development ===
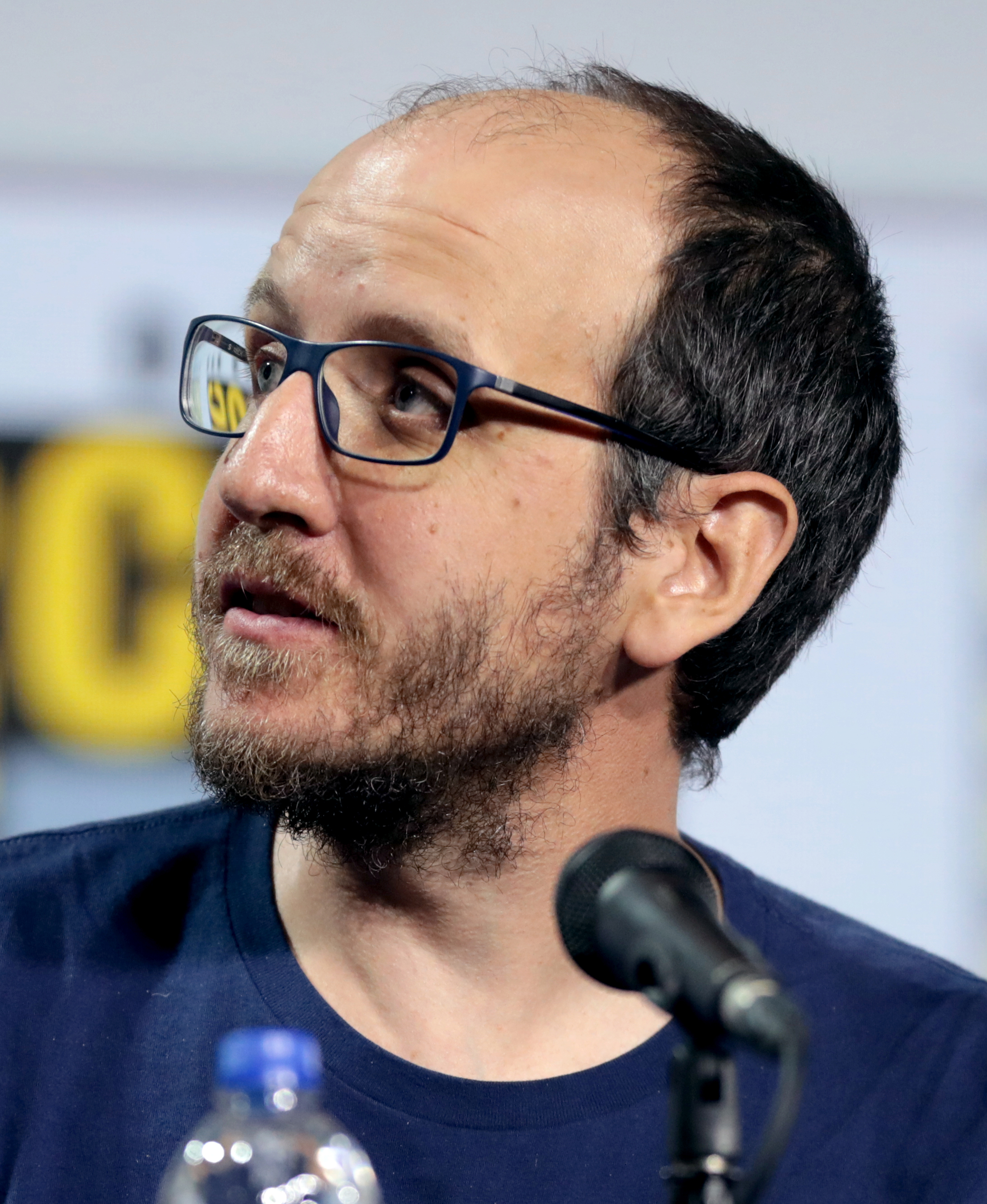
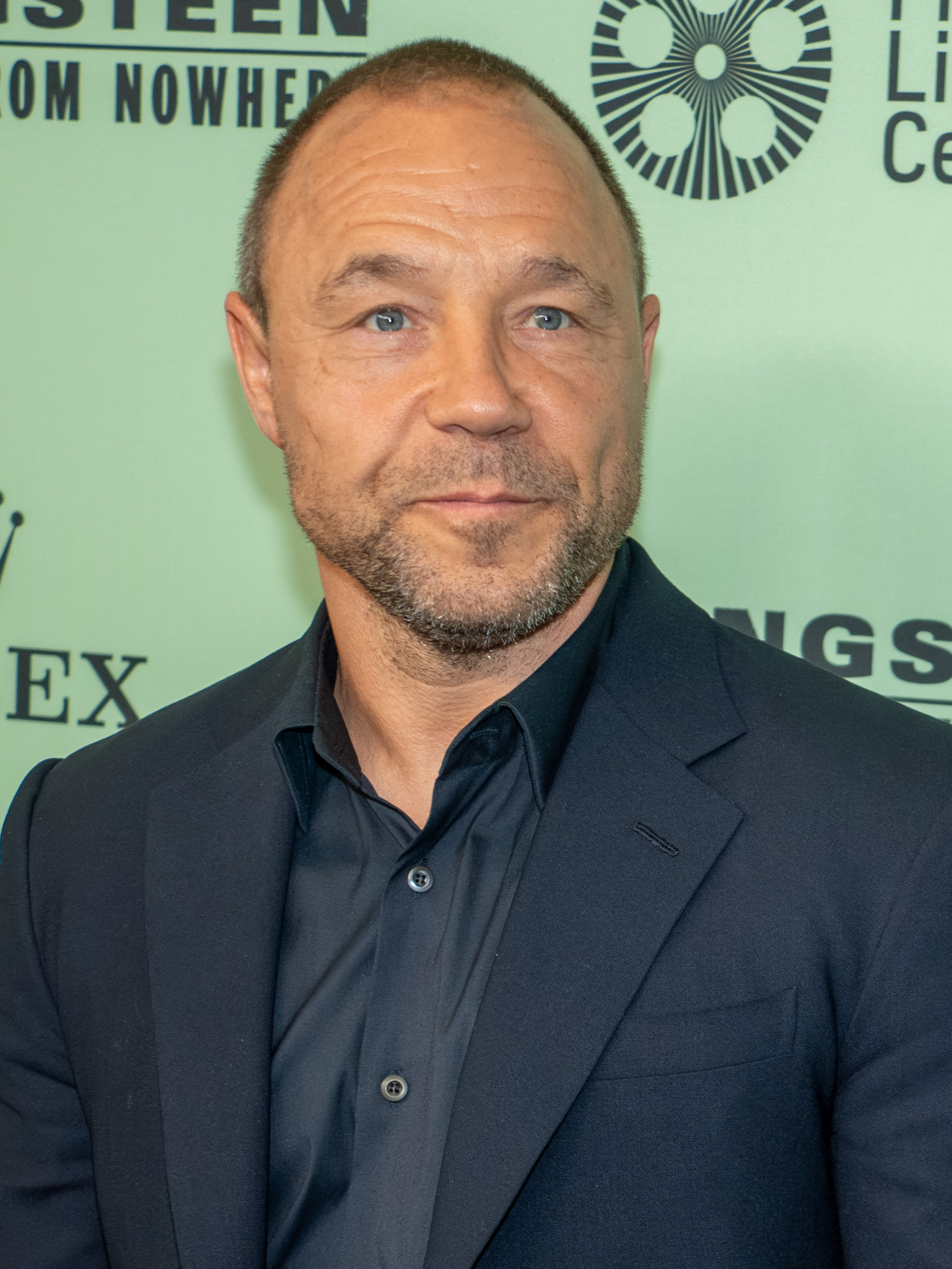
Creators and writers Jack Thorne (left) and Stephen Graham

Adolescence was originally conceived by Stephen Graham as a response to cases of knife crime by male teenagers in the United Kingdom, including the then-recent (2021 and 2023) murders of Ava White, Elianne Andam, and Brianna Ghey. He decided to create a drama exploring the motivation of extreme acts of violence against girls by young boys and collaborated with screenwriter Jack Thorne. "There had been a number of incidents where young boys were stabbing and killing young girls, and I'm calling them young boys because they're not developed to be men", Graham told Rolling Stone UK, adding, "They'd happened up and down the country, and my objective was merely to ask: 'What's going on? Why is this happening? Can we just have a look at it because this kind of thing didn't happen when I was a young lad.'" Thorne stated that no part of the drama is based on a specific true story. Speaking on BBC Radio 4's arts programme Front Row, Thorne stated that the two writers wanted to "look in the eye of modern male rage" and examine the influence of public figures, such as Andrew Tate on boys.

The series was announced in March 2024, with the working title Adolescence, to be written by Thorne and Graham. It is a four-part limited crime drama told in a real-time, one-shot style, with Philip Barantini as director. Barantini and Graham previously collaborated on Boiling Point (2021), which was also shot in one take. Warp Films, Matriarch Productions, and Plan B Entertainment produced the series for Netflix. Jo Johnson served as series producer, and Graham, Thorne and Barantini served as executive producers, alongside Mark Herbert, Emily Feller, Hannah Walters, Brad Pitt, Jeremy Kleiner, Dede Gardner, and Nina Wolarsky.

=== Casting ===
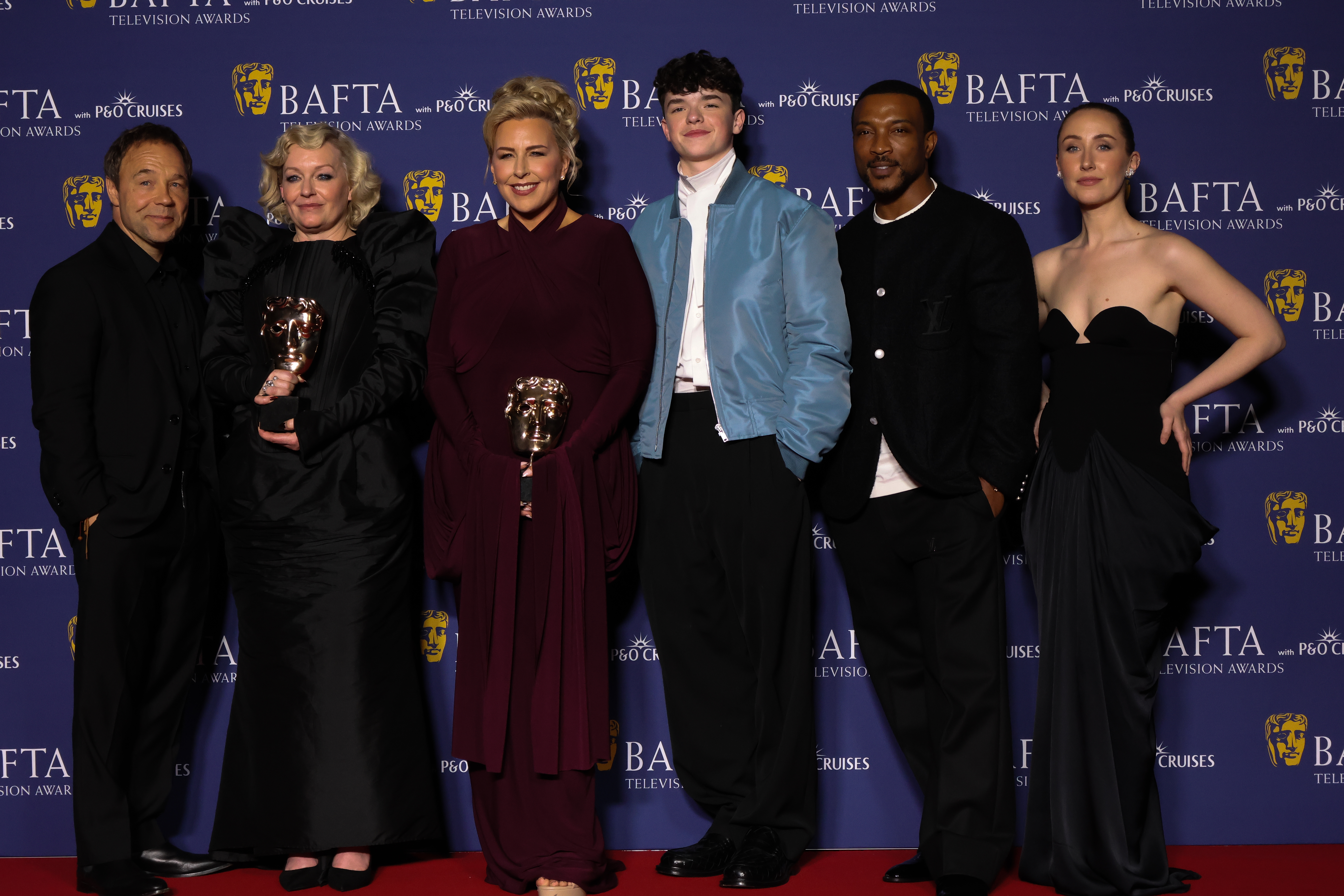
The cast of Adolescence at the 72nd British Academy Television Awards in 2026

Owen Cooper, Erin Doherty, Graham, Faye Marsay, Christine Tremarco, and Ashley Walters star. Cooper was cast in the role of the teenage murder suspect, Jamie Miller, at the age of 13, with no previous professional acting experience. Casting director Shaheen Baig had considered 500 boys for the part, but Cooper attracted her attention after sending her a demo tape and secured the role. Baig found Cooper and several of the other young cast members through Drama MOB in Manchester and Articulate Drama School and Agency in Bradford. Staff members of these drama schools, which serve students from underrepresented and deprived communities, resented the narrative that these actors had "done nothing and came from nowhere" prior to this production.

=== Filming ===
Filming began in the United Kingdom in July 2024 and wrapped around October 2024.

Adolescence is noted for its extensive use of one-shot filming, as each episode is shot in one take by cinematographer Matthew Lewis. Shooting was planned through multiple rehearsals building up to full technical run-throughs, during which the director of photography would plan camera movements. Each one-hour episode was shot around 10 times, with two takes per day. Episodes were shown as completed in one take, with no cuts or blending of shots together with CGI. Graham said that each episode took three weeks in total. The takes used were as follows: first episode, 2nd take; second episode, 13th take; third episode, 12th take; fourth episode, 16th take. The episodes were not shot in chronological order; Cooper's first day on set was shooting episode 3.

Filming locations for Adolescence included South Kirkby, South Elmsall, and Sheffield in Yorkshire. Minsthorpe Community College in South Elmsall was used as a location for the school scenes in episode 2, filmed over 1 week during 2024's summer. The interior scenes at the police station were shot at a specially constructed film set at the Production Park studio facility in South Kirkby in order to accommodate the complexities of single-shot filming.

== Release ==
The series was released on Netflix on 13 March 2025. It became the most-watched streaming television series in the United Kingdom in a single week, beating the record set by the Netflix series Fool Me Once in January 2024.

Adolescence received significant viewership success on Netflix following its release. In its first three weeks, the series garnered 96.7 million views on the platform. For the week ending 30 March 2025, it recorded 30.4 million views and ranked in the Top 10 most-watched lists across all 93 countries tracked by Netflix's Top 10 metrics. This performance has placed Adolescence ninth on Netflix's all-time viewership list, which is based on viewership data collected over the first 91 days of a title's availability.

== Reception ==
=== Critical response ===
Adolescence received widespread praise by critics. (Note: Attributed to multiple references:) On the review aggregator website Rotten Tomatoes, 97% of 112 critics' reviews are positive, with an average rating of 9.1/10. The website's consensus reads: "Stylistically bold and beautifully acted from top to bottom, Adolescence is a masterclass in televisual storytelling and a searing viewing experience that scars." Metacritic, which uses a weighted average, gave a score of 91 out of 100, based on 29 reviews, indicating "universal acclaim".

Writing in The Guardian, Lucy Mangan stated that Adolescence was "the closest thing to TV perfection in decades", singling out the acting by Cooper and Doherty for particular praise. Nandini Balial of RogerEbert.com also praised Cooper's acting for capturing "the quicksilver nature of those fraught years between childhood and adulthood". The Telegraph's Anita Singh found the series to be "quietly devastating" and the acting to be "phenomenal", although she said that the single-take filming technique could feel "like a gimmick". Sophie Butcher of Empire praised the continuous shooting, writing that it was "the most dizzying TV feat of the year" which served to enhance the on-screen emotion.

=== Viewership ===
Adolescence was the first streaming series to attain the top of the Barb Audiences weekly television ratings.

According to data from Showlabs, Adolescence ranked first on Netflix in the United States during the week of 17–23 March 2025.

=== Political impact ===
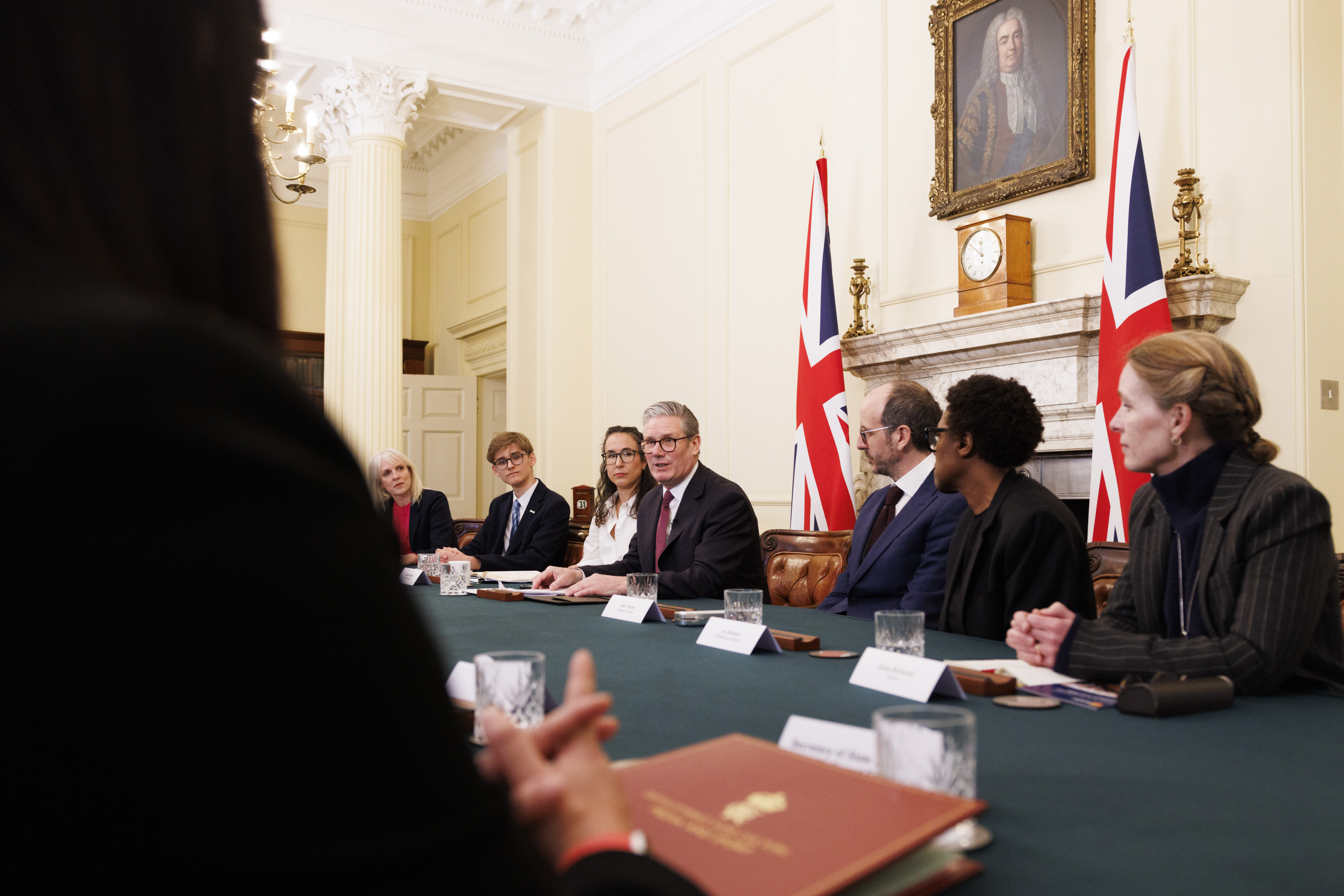
Prime Minister Keir Starmer holding a round table with the creators of the series on 31 March 2025

According to The Guardian, the show highlights the ways in which the manosphere has affected adolescent boys, with characters directly naming Andrew Tate and the "red pill" community as key influences on Jamie Miller and other boys his age. Anneliese Midgley, a member of Parliament, called for the series to be screened to Parliament and in schools, claiming it could help counter misogyny and violence against women and girls. Prime Minister Keir Starmer backed the call, writing on X, "As a father, watching Adolescence with my teenage son and daughter hit home hard." Starmer was however criticised for repeatedly referring to Adolescence as a documentary in his comments. The series was made free for viewing in UK secondary schools after Starmer's backing.

In March 2025, businessman and then-Trump administration advisor Elon Musk described the programme as "anti-white propaganda" and criticised the casting of a white actor to portray Jamie. The theory alleged that the show was based on the 2024 Southport stabbings, whose perpetrator was Black British, and that depicting the perpetrator as white was an intentional choice to demonise white people. Thorne called the claim "ridiculous" and said that the television series was inspired by but not directly based on any real-life events. The show itself was written several months prior to the Southport attack, though the attack occurred early during filming, before episode 2; the show was not filmed chronologically.

=== Accolades ===
In 2025, Cooper won the Primetime Emmy Award for Outstanding Supporting Actor in a Limited or Anthology Series or Movie for his performance as teen murderer Jamie Miller, making him the youngest male winner in the history of the Primetime Emmy Awards. Cooper also won the Actor Award, Critics' Choice Award and Golden Globe Award, becoming the youngest actor to ever win four major television acting awards for a single performance and to achieve this feat for a single season of television.

Award	Date of ceremony	Category	Recipient(s)	Result	Ref.
AACTA Awards	6 February 2026	Audience Choice Award for Favourite TV Series	Adolescence	Nominated	
AACTA International Awards	6 February 2026	Best Drama Series	Adolescence	Won	
AACTA International Awards	6 February 2026	Best Actor in a Series	Owen Cooper	Nominated	
AACTA International Awards	6 February 2026	Best Actor in a Series	Stephen Graham	Nominated	
AACTA International Awards	6 February 2026	Best Actress in a Series	Erin Doherty	Nominated	
AARP Movies for Grownups Awards	10 January 2026	Best TV Series or Limited Series	Adolescence	Nominated	
AARP Movies for Grownups Awards	10 January 2026	Best Actor – Television	Stephen Graham	Nominated	
Actor Awards	1 March 2026	Outstanding Performance by a Male Actor in a Television Movie or Limited Series	Owen Cooper	Won	
Actor Awards	1 March 2026	Outstanding Performance by a Male Actor in a Television Movie or Limited Series	Stephen Graham	Nominated	
Actor Awards	1 March 2026	Outstanding Performance by a Female Actor in a Television Movie or Limited Series	Erin Doherty	Nominated	
Actor Awards	1 March 2026	Outstanding Performance by a Female Actor in a Television Movie or Limited Series	Christine Tremarco	Nominated	
American Film Institute Awards	4 December 2025	Top 10 Television Programs	Adolescence	Won (Note: This award does not have a single winner, but recognizes multiple programs.)	
American Society of Cinematographers	8 March 2026	Limited or Anthology Series or Motion Picture Made for Television	Matthew Lewis (for "Episode 2")	Nominated	
Art Directors Guild Awards	28 February 2026	Television Movie or Limited Series	Adam Tomlinson	Nominated	
Artios Awards	26 February 2026	Limited Series	Shaheen Baig	Won	
Astra Awards	11 June 2025	Best Limited Series	Adolescence	Won	
Astra Awards	11 June 2025	Best Actor in a Limited Series or TV Movie	Stephen Graham	Nominated	
Astra Awards	11 June 2025	Best Supporting Actor in a Limited Series or TV Movie	Owen Cooper	Won	
Astra Awards	11 June 2025	Best Supporting Actor in a Limited Series or TV Movie	Ashley Walters	Nominated	
Astra Awards	11 June 2025	Best Supporting Actress in a Limited Series or Streaming Movie	Erin Doherty	Nominated	
Astra Awards	11 June 2025	Best Directing in a Limited Series or TV Movie	Philip Barantini (for "Episode 3")	Won	
Astra Awards	11 June 2025	Best Writing in a Limited Series or TV Movie	Jack Thorne and Stephen Graham (for "Episode 3")	Won	
Astra Awards	11 June 2025	Best Cast Ensemble in a Limited Series or TV Movie	Adolescence	Nominated	
Astra Awards	11 December 2025	Best Casting – Television	Adolescence	Nominated	
Black Reel TV Awards	18 August 2025	Outstanding Supporting Performance in a TV Movie or Limited Series	Ashley Walters	Nominated	
British Academy Television Awards	10 May 2026	Best Limited Drama	Stephen Graham, Jack Thorne, Philip Barantini, Jo Johnson, Mark Herbert, and Hannah Walters	Won	
British Academy Television Awards	10 May 2026	Best Leading Actor	Stephen Graham	Won	
British Academy Television Awards	10 May 2026	Best Supporting Actor	Owen Cooper	Won	
British Academy Television Awards	10 May 2026	Best Supporting Actor	Ashley Walters	Nominated	
British Academy Television Awards	10 May 2026	Best Supporting Actress	Erin Doherty	Nominated	
British Academy Television Awards	10 May 2026	Best Supporting Actress	Christine Tremarco	Won	
British Academy Television Awards	10 May 2026	Memorable Moment	Jamie snaps at the psychologist	Nominated	
British Academy Television Craft Awards	26 April 2026	Best Director: Fiction	Philip Barantini	Won	
British Academy Television Craft Awards	26 April 2026	Best Writer: Drama	Jack Thorne and Stephen Graham	Nominated	
British Academy Television Craft Awards	26 April 2026	Best Scripted Casting	Shaheen Baig	Nominated	
British Academy Television Craft Awards	26 April 2026	Best Photography & Lighting: Fiction	Matthew Lewis	Nominated	
British Academy Television Craft Awards	26 April 2026	Best Sound: Fiction	James Drake, Jules Woods, Rob Entwistle, Kiff McManus, Kyle Pickford, and Adam Mendez	Won	
British Society of Cinematographers	7 February 2026	Best Cinematography in a Television Drama (International/Streaming)	Matthew Lewis (for "Episode 2")	Nominated	
Broadcasting Press Guild Awards	18 March 2026	Best Single Drama or Mini-Series (1–4 Episodes)	Adolescence	Won	
Broadcasting Press Guild Awards	18 March 2026	Best Actor	Stephen Graham	Won (Note: Also for A Thousand Blows)	
Broadcasting Press Guild Awards	18 March 2026	Best Actress	Erin Doherty	Won	
Broadcasting Press Guild Awards	18 March 2026	Best Writer	Jack Thorne	Won (Note: Also for The Hack and Toxic Town)	
Broadcasting Press Guild Awards	18 March 2026	BPG Breakthrough Talent Award	Owen Cooper	Won (Note: Also for Film Club)	
Cinema Audio Society Awards	7 March 2026	Non-Theatrical Motion Pictures or Limited Series	Kiff McManus, Rob Entwistle, Jules Woods, James Drake, Mike Tehrani, Simon Diggins, and Adam Méndez (for "Episode 1")	Won	
Critics' Choice Awards	4 January 2026	Best Limited Series	Adolescence	Won	
Critics' Choice Awards	4 January 2026	Best Actor in a Limited Series or Movie Made for Television	Stephen Graham	Won	
Critics' Choice Awards	4 January 2026	Best Supporting Actor in a Limited Series or Movie Made for Television	Owen Cooper	Won	
Critics' Choice Awards	4 January 2026	Best Supporting Actor in a Limited Series or Movie Made for Television	Ashley Walters	Nominated	
Critics' Choice Awards	4 January 2026	Best Supporting Actress in a Limited Series or Movie Made for Television	Erin Doherty	Won	
Critics' Choice Awards	4 January 2026	Best Supporting Actress in a Limited Series or Movie Made for Television	Christine Tremarco	Nominated	
Digital Spy Awards	28 December 2025	Best British TV Show (Scripted)	Adolescence	1st place	
Digital Spy Awards	28 December 2025	Best Actor – TV	Erin Doherty	2nd place	
Digital Spy Awards	28 December 2025	Best Actor – TV	Stephen Graham	1st place	
Digital Spy Awards	28 December 2025	Best British Rising Star – TV	Owen Cooper	1st place	
Digital Spy Awards	28 December 2025	Best TV Moment	The national conversation that it sparked	2nd place	
Dorian TV Awards	8 July 2025	Best TV Movie or Miniseries	Adolescence	Won	
Dorian TV Awards	8 July 2025	Best TV Performance – Drama	Stephen Graham	Nominated	
Dorian TV Awards	8 July 2025	Best Supporting TV Performance – Drama	Owen Cooper	Nominated	
Dorian TV Awards	8 July 2025	Best Supporting TV Performance – Drama	Erin Doherty	Nominated	
Dorian TV Awards	8 July 2025	Most Visually Striking TV Show	Adolescence	Nominated	
Edinburgh TV Awards	21 August 2025	Best Drama	Adolescence	Won	
Edinburgh TV Awards	21 August 2025	Best TV Actor – Drama	Owen Cooper	Nominated	
Edinburgh TV Awards	21 August 2025	Best TV Actor – Drama	Stephen Graham	Nominated	
Edinburgh TV Awards	21 August 2025	Breakthrough Performance	Owen Cooper	Won	
Film Independent Spirit Awards	15 February 2026	Best New Scripted Series	Jack Thorne, Stephen Graham, Philip Barantini, Brad Pitt, Dede Gardner, Jeremy Kleiner, Nina Wolarsky, Hannah Walters, Mark Herbert, Emily Feller, Carina Sposato, Niall Shamma, and Peter Balm	Won	
Film Independent Spirit Awards	15 February 2026	Best Lead Performance in a New Scripted Series	Stephen Graham	Won	
Film Independent Spirit Awards	15 February 2026	Best Supporting Performance in a New Scripted Series	Erin Doherty	Won	
Film Independent Spirit Awards	15 February 2026	Best Breakthrough Performance in a New Scripted Series	Owen Cooper	Won	
Golden Globes	11 January 2026	Best Television Limited Series, Anthology Series, or Motion Picture Made for Television	Adolescence	Won	
Golden Globes	11 January 2026	Best Performance by a Male Actor in a Limited Series, Anthology Series, or Motion Picture Made for Television	Stephen Graham	Won	
Golden Globes	11 January 2026	Best Performance by a Male Actor in a Supporting Role on Television	Owen Cooper	Won	
Golden Globes	11 January 2026	Best Performance by a Male Actor in a Supporting Role on Television	Ashley Walters	Nominated	
Golden Globes	11 January 2026	Best Performance by a Female Actor in a Supporting Role on Television	Erin Doherty	Won	
Golden Reel Awards	8 March 2026	Outstanding Achievement in Sound Editing – Broadcast Long Form Dialogue / ADR	James Drake, Emma Butt, and Michele Woods (for "Episode 2")	Won	
Gotham TV Awards	2 June 2025	Breakthrough Limited Series	Stephen Graham, Jack Thorne, Philip Barantini, Emily Feller, Dede Gardner, Mark Herbert, Jeremy Kleiner, Brad Pitt, Hannah Walters, and Nina Wolarsky	Won	
Gotham TV Awards	2 June 2025	Outstanding Lead Performance in a Limited Series	Stephen Graham	Won	
Gotham TV Awards	2 June 2025	Outstanding Supporting Performance in a Limited Series	Owen Cooper	Won	
Gotham TV Awards	2 June 2025	Outstanding Supporting Performance in a Limited Series	Erin Doherty	Nominated	
Hollywood Music in Media Awards	19 November 2025	Best Original Score – TV Show/Limited Series	Aaron May and David Ridley	Nominated	
IndieWire Honors	6 June 2025	Breakthrough Award	Owen Cooper	Honored	
Location Managers Guild International Awards	23 August 2025	Outstanding Locations in a Television Anthology, Mow, or Limited Series	Adolescence	Nominated	
National Film Awards	1 July 2026	Best TV Drama Series	Adolescence	Nominated	
National Film Awards	1 July 2026	Best Actor in a TV Series	Stephen Graham	Nominated	
National Film Awards	1 July 2026	Best Supporting Actor in a TV Series	Ashley Walters	Nominated	
National Film Awards	1 July 2026	Best Supporting Actress in a TV Series	Erin Doherty	Nominated	
National Film Awards	1 July 2026	Best Screenplay in a TV Series	Stephen Graham and Jack Thorne	Nominated	
National Film Awards	1 July 2026	Best Newcomer	Owen Cooper	Nominated	
National Television Awards	10 September 2025	Adolescence	New Drama	Won	
National Television Awards	10 September 2025	Drama Performance	Owen Cooper	Won	
National Television Awards	10 September 2025	Drama Performance	Stephen Graham	Nominated	
Peabody Awards	31 May 2026	Entertainment	Adolescence (Note: Presented to Warp Films, Matriarch Productions, and Plan B for Netflix)	Won	
Primetime Emmy Awards	6 September 2025	Outstanding Casting for a Limited or Anthology Series or Movie	Shaheen Baig	Won	
Primetime Emmy Awards	6 September 2025	Outstanding Cinematography for a Limited or Anthology Series or Movie	Matthew Lewis (for "Episode 2")	Won	
Primetime Emmy Awards	6 September 2025	Outstanding Contemporary Costumes for a Limited or Anthology Series or Movie	Jessica Schofield, William Maher, and Tracey Cliffe (for "Episode 2")	Nominated	
Primetime Emmy Awards	6 September 2025	Outstanding Short Form Nonfiction or Reality Series	Kelly Caton, Jordan Anderson, Bram De Jonghe, Kia Milan, Nyle Washington, and Simon Richards	Won (Note: Specifically for Adolescence: The Making of Adolescence)	
Primetime Emmy Awards	6 September 2025	Outstanding Sound Editing for a Limited or Anthology Series, Movie or Special	James Drake, Michele Woods, Emma Butt, Rob Davidson, Jessica Watkins, Oli Ferris, and Sue Harding (for "Episode 1")	Nominated	
Primetime Emmy Awards	6 September 2025	Outstanding Sound Mixing for a Limited or Anthology Series or Movie	Jules Woods, Kiff McManus, Rob Entwistle, and Adam Méndez (for "Episode 1")	Nominated	
Primetime Emmy Awards	14 September 2025	Outstanding Limited or Anthology Series	Mark Herbert, Emily Feller, Hannah Walters, Stephen Graham, Brad Pitt, Dede Gardner, Jeremy Kleiner, Nina Wolarsky, Jack Thorne, Philip Barantini, Carina Sposato, Niall Shamma, Peter Balm, and Jo Johnson	Won	
Primetime Emmy Awards	14 September 2025	Outstanding Lead Actor in a Limited or Anthology Series or Movie	Stephen Graham	Won	
Primetime Emmy Awards	14 September 2025	Outstanding Supporting Actor in a Limited or Anthology Series or Movie	Owen Cooper (for "Episode 3")	Won	
Primetime Emmy Awards	14 September 2025	Outstanding Supporting Actor in a Limited or Anthology Series or Movie	Ashley Walters (for "Episode 2")	Nominated	
Primetime Emmy Awards	14 September 2025	Outstanding Supporting Actress in a Limited or Anthology Series or Movie	Erin Doherty (for "Episode 3")	Won	
Primetime Emmy Awards	14 September 2025	Outstanding Supporting Actress in a Limited or Anthology Series or Movie	Christine Tremarco (for "Episode 4")	Nominated	
Primetime Emmy Awards	14 September 2025	Outstanding Directing for a Limited or Anthology Series or Movie	Philip Barantini	Won	
Primetime Emmy Awards	14 September 2025	Outstanding Writing for a Limited or Anthology Series or Movie	Jack Thorne and Stephen Graham	Won	
Primetime Emmy Awards	20 May 2026	Television Academy Honors Award	Adolescence	Honored	
Producers Guild of America Awards	28 February 2026	Outstanding Producer of Limited or Anthology Series Television	Mark Herbert, Emily Feller, Hannah Walters, Stephen Graham, Brad Pitt, Jeremy Kleiner, Dede Gardner, Nina Wolarsky, Jack Thorne, Philip Barantini, Carina Sposato, Niall Shamma, Peter Balm, and Jo Johnson	Won	
Producers Guild of America Awards	28 February 2026	Outstanding Short Form Program	Adolescence: The Making of Adolescence	Won	
Queerties Awards	10 March 2026	Best TV Performance	Erin Doherty	Nominated	
Royal Television Society Programme Awards	24 March 2026	Limited Series and Single Drama	Adolescence	Won	
Royal Television Society Programme Awards	24 March 2026	Leading Actor – Male	Stephen Graham	Nominated	
Royal Television Society Programme Awards	24 March 2026	Supporting Actor – Female	Erin Doherty	Nominated	
Royal Television Society Programme Awards	24 March 2026	Supporting Actor – Male	Owen Cooper	Won	
Royal Television Society Programme Awards	24 March 2026	Writer – Drama	Jack Thorne and Stephen Graham	Won	
Royal Television Society Programme Awards	24 March 2026	Breakthrough Award	Owen Cooper	Won	
Satellite Awards	10 March 2026	Best Miniseries & Limited Series or Motion Picture Made for Television	Adolescence	Won	
Satellite Awards	10 March 2026	Best Actor in a Miniseries, Limited Series, or Motion Picture Made for Television	Stephen Graham	Nominated	
Satellite Awards	10 March 2026	Best Actor in a Supporting Role in a Series, Miniseries & Limited Series, or Motion Picture Made for Television	Owen Cooper	Nominated	
Satellite Awards	10 March 2026	Best Actress in a Supporting Role in a Series, Miniseries & Limited Series, or Motion Picture Made for Television	Erin Doherty	Nominated	
Seoul International Drama Awards	15 September 2025	Grand Prize	Adolescence	Won	
Seoul International Drama Awards	15 September 2025	Best Miniseries	Adolescence	Nominated	
Seoul International Drama Awards	15 September 2025	Best Actor	Owen Cooper	Won	
Seoul International Drama Awards	15 September 2025	Best Director	Philip Barantini	Won (Note: Tied with Hirokazu Kore-eda for Asura)	
Seoul International Drama Awards	15 September 2025	Best Screenwriter	Stephen Graham	Nominated	
Television and Radio Industries Club Awards	23 June 2026	Drama Programme	Adolescence	Won	
Television Critics Association Awards	20 August 2025	Program of the Year	Adolescence	Nominated	
Television Critics Association Awards	20 August 2025	Outstanding Achievement in Movies, Miniseries or Specials	Adolescence	Won	
Television Critics Association Awards	20 August 2025	Individual Achievement in Drama	Owen Cooper	Nominated	
Television Critics Association Awards	20 August 2025	Individual Achievement in Drama	Stephen Graham	Nominated	

== Future ==
In April 2025, executive producers and Plan B Entertainment co-presidents Dede Gardner and Jeremy Kleiner confirmed that they spoke with Barantini about the "next iteration" of the series. Gardner said that they had thought about how they can "widen the aperture, stay true to its DNA [and] not be repetitive", but did not reveal too much about their plans; Kleiner added that they hope Graham and Thorne will reteam on the project.

In January 2026, when questioned about the chances of a second season, Graham said, "It's somewhere in the deep recesses of my mind and Jack [Thorne]'s mind, and we'll pull it out in three or four years, so stay tuned."

== See also ==
- 2014 Isla Vista killings – Terrorist attacks in California, U.S.
- Age of criminal responsibility – Minimum age of a child committed crime
- Louis Theroux: Inside the Manosphere – 2026 documentary film by Adrian Choa
- Online Safety Act 2023 – UK law to regulate online content
- Sex differences in crime – Differences between men and women as the perpetrators or victims of crime
