= TCA Award for Individual Achievement in Drama =

Television award

The TCA Award for Individual Achievement in Drama is an award given by the Television Critics Association.

== Winners and nominees ==
Year	Winner	Program	Other nominees
1996–1997 (13th)	Andre Braugher	Homicide: Life on the Street (NBC)	Gillian Anderson – The X-Files (Fox); David Duchovny – The X-Files (Fox); Anthony Edwards – ER (NBC); Dennis Franz – NYPD Blue (ABC); Joe Pantoliano – EZ Streets (CBS)
1997–1998 (14th)	Andre Braugher	Homicide: Life on the Street (NBC)	Kevin Anderson – Nothing Sacred (ABC); Anthony Edwards – ER (NBC); Dennis Franz – NYPD Blue (ABC); Kyle Secor – Homicide: Life on the Street (NBC)
1998–1999 (15th)	James Gandolfini and David E. Kelley	The Sopranos (HBO) The Practice (ABC)	David Chase – The Sopranos (HBO); Dennis Franz – NYPD Blue (ABC); Camryn Manheim – The Practice (ABC); Dylan McDermott – The Practice (ABC)
1999–2000 (16th)	James Gandolfini	The Sopranos (HBO)	Allison Janney – The West Wing (NBC); Martin Sheen – The West Wing (NBC); Aaron Sorkin – The West Wing (NBC); Sela Ward – Once and Again (ABC)
2000–2001 (17th)	James Gandolfini	The Sopranos (HBO)	Edie Falco – The Sopranos (HBO); Sarah Michelle Gellar – Buffy the Vampire Slayer (The WB); Chi McBride – Boston Public (Fox); Martin Sheen – The West Wing (NBC)
2001–2002 (18th)	Michael Chiklis	The Shield (FX)	Lauren Graham – Gilmore Girls (The WB); Rachel Griffiths – Six Feet Under (HBO); Martin Sheen – The West Wing (NBC); Kiefer Sutherland – 24 (Fox)
2002–2003 (19th)	Edie Falco	The Sopranos (HBO)	James Gandolfini – The Sopranos (HBO); Jennifer Garner – Alias (ABC); Neal McDonough – Boomtown (NBC); Kiefer Sutherland – 24 (Fox)
2003–2004 (20th)	Ian McShane	Deadwood (HBO)	Edie Falco – The Sopranos (HBO); James Gandolfini – The Sopranos (HBO); Al Pacino – Angels in America (HBO); Kiefer Sutherland – 24 (Fox)
2004–2005 (21st)	Hugh Laurie	House (Fox)	Kristen Bell – Veronica Mars (UPN); Matthew Fox – Lost (ABC); Ian McShane – Deadwood (HBO); Kiefer Sutherland – 24 (Fox)
2005–2006 (22nd)	Hugh Laurie	House (Fox)	Alan Alda – The West Wing (NBC); James Gandolfini – The Sopranos (HBO); Kyra Sedgwick – The Closer (TNT); Kiefer Sutherland – 24 (Fox)
2006–2007 (23rd)	Michael C. Hall	Dexter (Showtime)	Connie Britton – Friday Night Lights (NBC); Kyle Chandler – Friday Night Lights (NBC); Hugh Laurie – House (Fox); Helen Mirren – Prime Suspect: The Final Act (PBS)
2007–2008 (24th)	Paul Giamatti	John Adams (HBO)	Connie Britton – Friday Night Lights (NBC); Glenn Close – Damages (FX); Jon Hamm – Mad Men (AMC); David Simon – The Wire (HBO)
2008–2009 (25th)	Bryan Cranston	Breaking Bad (AMC)	Glenn Close – Damages (FX); Walton Goggins – The Shield (FX); Jon Hamm – Mad Men (AMC); Hugh Laurie – House (Fox)
2009–2010 (26th)	Julianna Margulies	The Good Wife (CBS)	Bryan Cranston – Breaking Bad (AMC); John Lithgow – Dexter (Showtime); Aaron Paul – Breaking Bad (AMC); Katey Sagal – Sons of Anarchy (FX)
2010–2011 (27th)	Jon Hamm	Mad Men (AMC)	Steve Buscemi – Boardwalk Empire (HBO); Peter Dinklage – Game of Thrones (HBO); Julianna Margulies – The Good Wife (CBS); Margo Martindale – Justified (FX); Timothy Olyphant – Justified (FX)
2011–2012 (28th)	Claire Danes	Homeland (Showtime)	Bryan Cranston – Breaking Bad (AMC); Peter Dinklage – Game of Thrones (HBO); Jon Hamm – Mad Men (AMC); Jessica Lange – American Horror Story (FX)
2012–2013 (29th)	Tatiana Maslany	Orphan Black (BBC America)	Bryan Cranston – Breaking Bad (AMC); Vera Farmiga – Bates Motel (A&E); Monica Potter – Parenthood (NBC); Matthew Rhys – The Americans (FX)
2013–2014 (30th)	Matthew McConaughey	True Detective (HBO)	Bryan Cranston – Breaking Bad (AMC); Julianna Margulies – The Good Wife (CBS); Tatiana Maslany – Orphan Black (BBC America); Matthew Rhys – The Americans (FX)
2014–2015 (31st)	Jon Hamm	Mad Men (AMC)	Viola Davis – How to Get Away with Murder (ABC); Taraji P. Henson – Empire (Fox); Bob Odenkirk – Better Call Saul (AMC); Matthew Rhys – The Americans (FX)
2015–2016 (32nd)	Sarah Paulson	The People v. O. J. Simpson: American Crime Story (FX)	Bryan Cranston – All the Way (HBO); Rami Malek – Mr. Robot (USA); Bob Odenkirk – Better Call Saul (AMC); Keri Russell – The Americans (FX); Courtney B. Vance – The People v. O. J. Simpson: American Crime Story (FX)
2016–2017 (33rd)	Carrie Coon	Fargo (FX) & The Leftovers (HBO)	Sterling K. Brown – This Is Us (NBC); Claire Foy – The Crown (Netflix); Nicole Kidman – Big Little Lies (HBO); Jessica Lange – Feud: Bette and Joan (FX); Elisabeth Moss – The Handmaid's Tale (Hulu); Susan Sarandon – Feud: Bette and Joan (FX)
2017–2018 (34th)	Keri Russell	The Americans (FX)	Jodie Comer – Killing Eve (BBC America); Darren Criss – The Assassination of Gianni Versace: American Crime Story (FX); Elisabeth Moss – The Handmaid's Tale (Hulu); Sandra Oh – Killing Eve (BBC America); Matthew Rhys – The Americans (FX)
2018–2019 (35th)	Michelle Williams	Fosse/Verdon (FX)	Amy Adams – Sharp Objects (HBO); Patricia Arquette – Escape at Dannemora (Showtime); Christine Baranski – The Good Fight (CBS All Access); Jodie Comer – Killing Eve (BBC America); Billy Porter – Pose (FX)
2019–2020 (36th)	Regina King	Watchmen (HBO)	Cate Blanchett – Mrs. America (FX on Hulu); Kaitlyn Dever – Unbelievable (Netflix); Mark Ruffalo – I Know This Much Is True (HBO); Rhea Seehorn – Better Call Saul (AMC); Jeremy Strong – Succession (HBO); Merritt Wever – Unbelievable (Netflix)
2020–2021 (37th)	Michaela Coel	I May Destroy You (HBO)	Ethan Hawke – The Good Lord Bird (Showtime); Thuso Mbedu – The Underground Railroad (Prime Video); Elizabeth Olsen – WandaVision (Disney+); Michaela Jaé Rodriguez – Pose (FX); Omar Sy – Lupin (Netflix); Anya Taylor-Joy – The Queen's Gambit (Netflix); Kate Winslet – Mare of Easttown (HBO)
2021–2022 (38th)	Mandy Moore	This Is Us (NBC)	Lee Jung-jae – Squid Game (Netflix); Michael Keaton — Dopesick (Hulu); Melanie Lynskey – Yellowjackets (Showtime); Bob Odenkirk – Better Call Saul (AMC); Margaret Qualley – Maid (Netflix); Adam Scott – Severance (Apple TV+); Rhea Seehorn – Better Call Saul (AMC); Amanda Seyfried – The Dropout (Hulu); Jeremy Strong – Succession (HBO)
2022–2023 (39th)	Rhea Seehorn	Better Call Saul (AMC)	Christine Baranski – The Good Fight (Paramount+); Kieran Culkin – Succession (HBO); Dominique Fishback – Swarm (Amazon); Betty Gilpin – Mrs. Davis (Peacock); Pedro Pascal – The Last of Us (HBO); Bella Ramsey – The Last of Us (HBO); Sarah Snook – Succession (HBO); Jeremy Strong – Succession (HBO)
2023–2024 (40th)	Anna Sawai	Shōgun (FX)	Jodie Foster – True Detective: Night Country (HBO / Max); Richard Gadd – Baby Reindeer (Netflix); Hiroyuki Sanada – Shōgun (FX); Andrew Scott – Ripley (Netflix); Juno Temple – Fargo (FX)
2024–2025 (41st)	Noah Wyle	The Pitt (HBO Max)	Jacob Anderson – Interview with the Vampire (AMC); Kathy Bates – Matlock (CBS); Owen Cooper — Adolescence (Netflix); Stephen Graham — Adolescence (Netflix); Britt Lower – Severance (Apple TV+); Diego Luna – Andor (Disney+); Adam Scott — Severance (Apple TV+); Tramell Tillman – Severance (Apple TV+)
2025–2026 (42nd)	Rhea Seehorn	Pluribus (Apple TV+)	Marisa Abela – Industry (HBO Max); Sterling K. Brown – Paradise (Hulu); David Harbour – DTF St. Louis (HBO Max); Katherine LaNasa – The Pitt (HBO Max); Ken Leung – Industry (HBO Max); Myha'la – Industry (HBO Max); Connor Storrie – Heated Rivalry (Crave/HBO Max); Hudson Williams – Heated Rivalry (Crave/HBO Max); Noah Wyle – The Pitt (HBO Max)

== Multiple wins ==
3 wins

- James Gandolfini (consecutive)

2 wins

- Andre Braugher (consecutive)
- Jon Hamm
- Hugh Laurie (consecutive)
- Rhea Seehorn

== Multiple nominees ==
6 nominations

- Bryan Cranston
- James Gandolfini

5 nominations

- Jon Hamm
- Kiefer Sutherland

4 nominations

- Hugh Laurie
- Matthew Rhys
- Rhea Seehorn

3 nominations

- Edie Falco
- Dennis Franz
- Julianna Margulies
- Bob Odenkirk
- Martin Sheen
- Jeremy Strong

2 nominations

- Christine Baranski
- Andre Braugher
- Connie Britton
- Sterling K. Brown
- Glenn Close
- Jodie Comer
- Peter Dinklage
- Anthony Edwards
- Jessica Lange
- Tatiana Maslany
- Ian McShane
- Elisabeth Moss
- Keri Russell
- Adam Scott
- Noah Wyle
