= Owen Cooper =

English actor (born 2009)

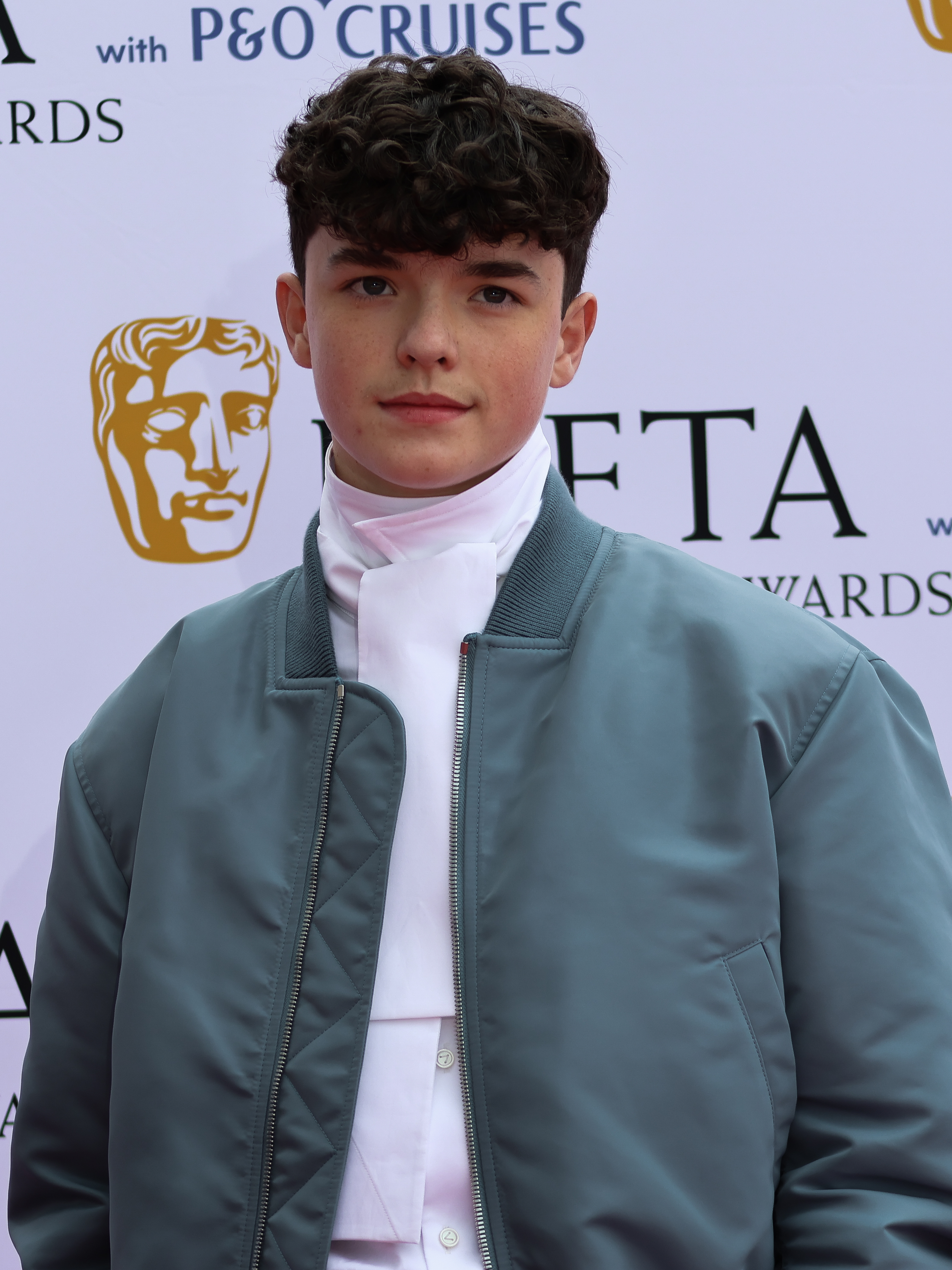
- Cooper at the 2026 British Academy Television Awards
- Born: Owen Patrick Cooper; 5 December 2009 (age 16); Warrington, Cheshire, England
- Occupation: Actor
- Years active: 2025–present

Owen Patrick Cooper (born 5 December 2009) is an English actor. He is best known for his debut role as a teenage murder suspect in the Netflix miniseries Adolescence (2025). For his performance, he became the youngest male actor to win an Actor Award and Primetime Emmy Award, as well as the youngest male actor to win the supporting actor BAFTA TV Award and Golden Globe Award for a series, miniseries, or television film.

== Early life ==
Owen Patrick Cooper was born on 5 December 2009 in Warrington, Cheshire. His mother is a carer and his father works in IT. He has two brothers. A former member of the Warrington Rylands U15 squad, he originally wanted to be a footballer before taking weekly acting lessons with The Drama Mob, a drama school co-created by Coronation Street actress Tina O'Brien and Esther Morgan, in Manchester. He was inspired to pursue acting after watching Tom Holland's performance in The Impossible (2012), and stated that his family was supportive yet "not pushy" during his early interest in drama and acting.

== Career ==
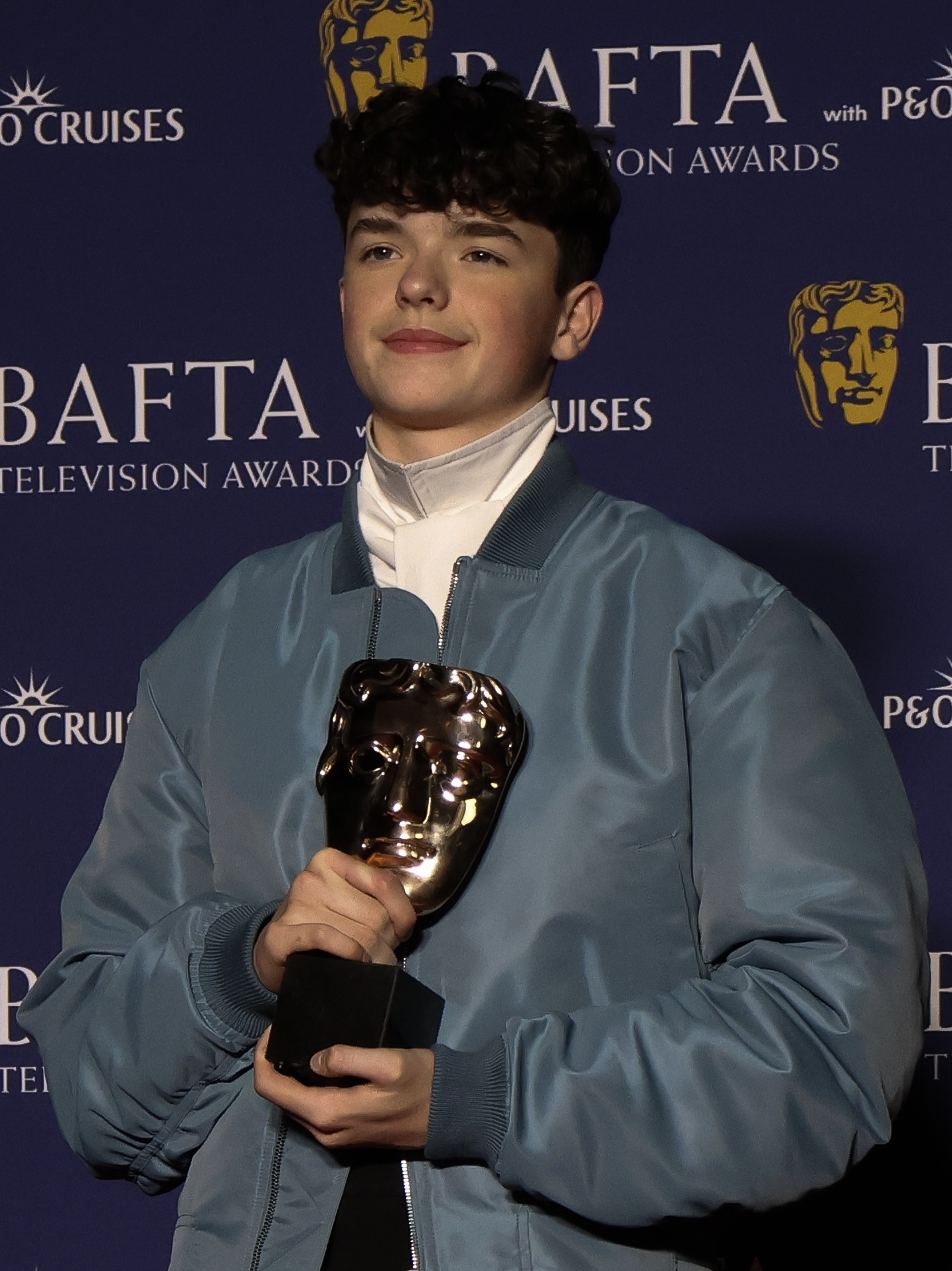
Cooper received widespread critical acclaim for his role as Jamie Miller in Adolescence (2025).

In March 2025, Cooper made his screen debut as Jamie Miller, a 13-year-old accused of murder, in the Netflix miniseries Adolescence. Series co-creator Stephen Graham had sought to cast an unknown actor from northern England for the role. The production team for Adolescence approached Cooper's drama school and asked to view tapes of their strongest northern actors; teachers at the school later stated that they believed that Cooper "just had something" and that the series' production team revisited the school on numerous occasions until he was eventually offered the role. He had been selected from a pool of over 500 auditions. He filmed the series from July to October 2024.

The role earned him widespread critical acclaim, with the Evening Standard writing that "his is a performance that may be the best debut ever seen by a child actor". He subsequently won the Primetime Emmy Award for Outstanding Supporting Actor in a Limited or Anthology Series or Movie at the 77th Primetime Emmy Awards, making him the youngest male actor to win an Emmy and the youngest actor to ever be nominated in the category. He also became the youngest actor to win the British Academy Television Award for Best Supporting Actor and the Golden Globe Award for Best Supporting Actor on Television, while his win for Outstanding Performance by a Male Actor in a Miniseries or Television Movie at the 32nd Actor Awards made him the youngest recipient of the award in any category. Cooper also won the Critics' Choice Television Award for Best Supporting Actor in a Movie/Miniseries, the Gotham TV Award for Outstanding Supporting Performance in a Limited Series, and was named a Screen International Star of Tomorrow.

In May 2025, he was featured in the music video for "Little Bit Closer" by English musician Sam Fender. Later that year, he played Callum in the BBC Three series Film Club. He played young Heathcliff in Emerald Fennell's Wuthering Heights, which was released on 13 February 2026. In August 2026, Cooper provided the narration for the campaign film of Liverpool FC's 2026–27 third kit launch.

== Personal life ==
As of April 2025, Cooper resides in the Warrington suburb of Orford. He is a fan of the football club Liverpool, and delivered the match ball at a Super League rugby match between Warrington Wolves and Hull F.C. on 12 April 2025. On 31 May 2026, he played in Soccer Aid 2026.

== Filmography ==
Key
†	Denotes films that have not yet been released

=== Film ===
Year	Title	Role	Notes
2026	Wuthering Heights	Young Heathcliff	
TBA	Cry to Heaven †	Domenico	Post-production
TBA	Foxfinder †	TBA	Filming

=== Television ===
Year	Title	Role	Notes	Ref.
2025	Adolescence	Jamie Miller	Main role	
2025	Film Club	Callum	Recurring role	

=== Music videos ===
Year	Title	Artist	Ref.
2025	"Little Bit Closer"	Sam Fender	
2026	"In My Life"	The Beatles	

=== Commercials ===
Year	Title	Role	Ref.
2026	"Feel the Anfield Effect"	Himself (narration)	

== Awards and nominations ==
Award	Year	Category	Nominated work	Result	Ref.
AACTA Awards	2026	Best Actor in a Series	Adolescence	Nominated	
Actor Awards	2026	Outstanding Performance by a Male Actor in a Miniseries or Television Movie	Adolescence	Won	
Astra TV Awards	2025	Best Supporting Actor in a Limited Series or TV Movie	Adolescence	Won	
British Academy Television Awards	2026	Best Supporting Actor	Adolescence	Won	
Broadcasting Press Guild Awards	2026	Breakthrough Talent Award	Adolescence	Won	
Critics' Choice Television Awards	2026	Best Supporting Actor in a Movie/Miniseries	Adolescence	Won	
Edinburgh International Television Festival	2025	Best TV Actor – Drama	Adolescence	Nominated	
Edinburgh International Television Festival	2025	Breakthrough Performance	Adolescence	Won	
Gold Derby TV Awards	2025	Breakthrough Performer of the Year	Adolescence	Won	
Gold Derby TV Awards	2025	Limited/Movie Supporting Actor	Adolescence	Won	
Golden Globe Awards	2026	Best Supporting Actor on Television	Adolescence	Won	
Gotham TV Awards	2025	Outstanding Supporting Performance in a Limited Series	Adolescence	Won	
Independent Spirit Awards	2026	Best Breakthrough Performance in a New Scripted Series	Adolescence	Won	
IndieWire Honors	2025	Breakthrough Award	Adolescence	Won	
National Television Awards	2025	Drama Performance	Adolescence	Won	
Primetime Emmy Awards	2025	Outstanding Supporting Actor in a Limited or Anthology Series or Movie	Adolescence	Won	
Royal Television Society Programme Awards	2026	Supporting Actor - Male	Adolescence	Won	
Royal Television Society Programme Awards	2026	Breakthrough Award	Adolescence	Won	
Satellite Awards	2025	Best Supporting Actor on Television	Adolescence	Nominated	
Seoul International Drama Awards	2025	Best Actor	Adolescence	Won	
Sky Arts Awards	2025	The Times Breakthrough Award	Adolescence	Won	
TCA Awards	2025	Individual Achievement in Drama	Adolescence	Nominated	
