= 30th National Television Awards =

British awards ceremony in 2025

- Date: 10 September 2025
- Location: The O2 Arena, London
- Country: United Kingdom
- Presented by: Various
- Hosted by: Joel Dommett
- Most awards: Adolescence, EastEnders (2)
- Most nominations: Adolescence, Coronation Street, EastEnders (3)
- Website: www.nationaltvawards.com

Television/radio coverage
- Network: ITV1
- Runtime: 150 minutes

The 30th National Television Awards were held on 10 September 2025 at the O2 Arena and hosted by Joel Dommett for the fifth year running. The longlist nominations were released on 20 May 2025, and the shortlist was announced on 19 August 2025.

Gary Lineker's win for TV Presenter was notable for breaking a 23-year winning streak held by Ant & Dec.

== Performances ==
- McFly – "Don't Stop Me Now", "5 Colours in Her Hair" and "All About You"
- The Assembly - "Movin' On Up"

== Awards ==
Category and presenter(s)	Winner	Shortlisted
Reality Competition; Presented by Elizabeth Hurley & Robert Rinder	I'm a Celebrity...Get Me Out of Here! (ITV1)	Love Island (ITV2); Race Across the World (BBC One); The Traitors (BBC One)
New Drama; Presented by Anna Friel	Adolescence (Netflix)	Code of Silence (ITV1); Ludwig (BBC One); MobLand (Paramount+); Rivals (Disney+)
Quiz Show; Presented by Alex Jones & Roman Kemp	The 1% Club (ITV1)	Michael McIntyre's The Wheel (BBC One); Richard Osman's House of Games (BBC Two); The Chase (ITV1)
Authored Documentary; Presented by Nicky Campbell & Davina McCall	Molly-Mae: Behind It All (Prime Video)	Boyzone: No Matter What (Sky Documentaries); Flintoff (Disney+); Strictly Amy: Cancer and Me (BBC One); There's Only One Rob Burrow (BBC One)
Returning Drama; Presented by Trevor McDonald & Dermot O'Leary	Call the Midwife (BBC One)	Gangs of London (Sky Atlantic); Heartstopper (Netflix); Slow Horses (Apple TV+); Vera (ITV1)
TV Presenter; Presented by Alesha Dixon	Gary Lineker (Match of the Day – BBC One)	Alison Hammond (This Morning – ITV1); Ant & Dec (I'm a Celebrity...Get Me Out of Here! – ITV1); Claudia Winkleman (Strictly Come Dancing and The Traitors) – (BBC One); Stacey Solomon (Sort Your Life Out – BBC One)
Factual Entertainment; Presented by Olivia Attwood	Clarkson's Farm (Prime Video)	Gogglebox (Channel 4); Sort Your Life Out (BBC One); Stacey & Joe (BBC One); The Martin Lewis Money Show Live (ITV1)
Drama Performance; Presented by Emily Atack	Owen Cooper (as Jamie Miller, Adolescence – Netflix)	Brenda Blethyn (as DCI Vera Stanhope, Vera – ITV1); Rose Ayling-Ellis (as Alison Brooks, Code of Silence – ITV1); Stephen Graham (as Eddie Miller, Adolescence / Sugar Goodson, A Thousand Blows – Netflix / Disney+); Tom Hardy (as Harry Da Souza, MobLand – Paramount+)
The Bruce Forsyth Entertainment Award; Presented by Stacey Solomon & Joe Swash	Michael McIntyre's Big Show (BBC One)	The Graham Norton Show (BBC One); The Masked Singer (ITV1); Would I Lie to You? (BBC One)
Serial Drama; Presented by Tom Fletcher & Danny Jones	EastEnders (BBC One)	Casualty (BBC One); Coronation Street (ITV1); Emmerdale (ITV1); Hollyoaks (Channel 4)
Serial Drama Performance; Presented by Michelle Ryan & Jessie Wallace	Steve McFadden (as Phil Mitchell, EastEnders – BBC One)	Eden Taylor-Draper (as Belle Dingle, Emmerdale – ITV1); Jack P. Shepherd (as David Platt, Coronation Street – ITV1); Jacqueline Jossa (as Lauren Branning, EastEnders – BBC One); Sue Devaney (as Debbie Webster, Coronation Street – ITV1)
Comedy; Presented by Greg Davies	Gavin & Stacey (BBC One)	Brassic (Sky Max); Michael McIntyre's 25th Year Stand-Up Special (BBC One); Mrs Brown's Boys (BBC One/RTÉ One)
Daytime; Presented by Pete Wicks & Sam Thompson	This Morning (ITV1)	James Martin's Saturday Morning (ITV1); Loose Women (ITV1); Scam Interceptors (BBC One)
Talent Show; Presented by Maya Jama	Strictly Come Dancing (BBC One)	Britain's Got Talent (ITV1); The Great British Bake Off (Channel 4); The Great Pottery Throw Down (Channel 4); The Voice UK (ITV1)
Special Recognition; Presented by Jonathan Ross	Wallace & Gromit	

== Multiple wins ==
Programmes with multiple wins
Wins	Programme
2	Adolescence
2	EastEnders

Networks with multiple wins
Wins	Network
7	BBC One
3	ITV1
2	Netflix
2	Prime Video

== Multiple nominations ==
Programmes with multiple nominations
Nominations	Programme
3	Adolescence
3	Coronation Street
3	EastEnders
2	Britain's Got Talent
2	Code of Silence
2	Emmerdale
2	I'm a Celebrity...Get Me Out of Here!
2	MobLand
2	Sort Your Life Out
2	Strictly Come Dancing
2	The Traitors
2	This Morning
2	Vera

Networks with multiple nominations
Nominations	Network
24	BBC One
21	ITV1
4	Channel 4
4	Netflix
3	Disney+
2	Paramount+
2	Prime Video
