= 41st TCA Awards =

2025 television award ceremony

- Date: August 20, 2025

Highlights
- Program of the Year: The Pitt
- Outstanding New Program: The Pitt

The 41st TCA Awards were announced on August 20, 2025. The nominees were announced by the Television Critics Association on July 9, 2025.

== Ceremony information ==
The medical drama The Pitt won four awards: Program of the Year, Outstanding New Program, Individual Achievement in Drama (for Noah Wyle) and Outstanding Achievement in Drama. Other winners include The Studio, SNL50: The Anniversary Special, Adolescene, Pee-Wee as Himself and Sesame Street.

== Winners and nominees ==
Category	Winner	Nominees
Program of the Year	The Pitt (HBO Max)	Adolescence (Netflix); Andor (Disney+); Hacks (HBO Max); The Rehearsal (HBO); Severance (Apple TV+); The Studio (Apple TV+); The White Lotus (HBO)
Outstanding Achievement in Comedy	The Studio (Apple TV+)	Abbott Elementary (ABC); English Teacher (FX); Hacks (HBO Max); Nobody Wants This (Netflix); The Rehearsal (HBO); Shrinking (Apple TV+); Somebody Somewhere (HBO); What We Do in the Shadows (FX)
Outstanding Achievement in Drama	The Pitt (HBO Max)	Andor (Disney+); Industry (HBO); Interview with the Vampire (AMC); The Last of Us (HBO); Matlock (CBS); Severance (Apple TV+); The White Lotus (HBO)
Outstanding Achievement in Movies, Miniseries or Specials	Adolescence (Netflix)	Agatha All Along (Disney+); Disclaimer (Apple TV+); Dying for Sex (FX); The Penguin (HBO); Rebel Ridge (Netflix); Say Nothing (FX); Sirens (Netflix)
Outstanding New Program	The Pitt (HBO Max)	Common Side Effects (Adult Swim); English Teacher (FX); Matlock (CBS); Nobody Wants This (Netflix); North of North (Netflix); Paradise (Hulu); The Studio (Apple TV+)
Individual Achievement in Comedy	Bridget Everett – Somebody Somewhere (HBO)	Liza Colón-Zayas – The Bear (FX); Hannah Einbinder – Hacks (HBO Max); Nathan Fielder – The Rehearsal (HBO); Harrison Ford – Shrinking (Apple TV+); Janelle James – Abbott Elementary (ABC); Seth Rogen – The Studio (Apple TV+); Jean Smart – Hacks (HBO Max); Michelle Williams – Dying for Sex (FX)
Individual Achievement in Drama	Noah Wyle – The Pitt (HBO Max)	Jacob Anderson – Interview with the Vampire (AMC); Kathy Bates – Matlock (CBS); Owen Cooper – Adolescence (Netflix); Stephen Graham – Adolescence (Netflix); Britt Lower – Severance (Apple TV+); Diego Luna – Andor (Disney+); Adam Scott – Severance (Apple TV+); Tramell Tillman – Severance (Apple TV+)
Outstanding Achievement in News and Information	Pee-wee as Himself (HBO)	60 Minutes (CBS); The Americas (NBC); Frontline (PBS); Bad Influence: The Dark Side of Kidfluencing (Netflix); Leonardo da Vinci (PBS); PBS News Hour (PBS); We Will Dance Again (Paramount+)
Outstanding Achievement in Variety, Talk or Sketch	SNL50: The Anniversary Special (NBC)	The Daily Show (Comedy Central); Everybody's Live with John Mulaney (Netflix); Hot Ones (YouTube); Jimmy Kimmel Live! (ABC); Late Night with Seth Meyers (NBC); The Late Show with Stephen Colbert (CBS); Last Week Tonight with John Oliver (HBO); Saturday Night Live (NBC)
Outstanding Achievement in Reality	The Traitors (Peacock)	The Amazing Race (CBS); The Boyfriend (Netflix); Conan O'Brien Must Go (HBO Max); Couples Therapy (Showtime); Culinary Class Wars (Netflix); RuPaul's Drag Race (MTV); Survivor (CBS); Top Chef (Bravo)
Outstanding Achievement in Family Programming	Doctor Who (Disney+)	Forever (Netflix); Heartstopper (Netflix); Jentry Chau vs. the Underworld (Netflix); Star Trek: Prodigy (Netflix); Wizards Beyond Waverly Place (Disney Channel); WondLa (Apple TV+); XO, Kitty (Netflix); Your Friendly Neighborhood Spider-Man (Disney+)
Outstanding Achievement in Children's Programming	Sesame Street (HBO Max)	Bluey Minisodes (Disney+); Carl the Collector (PBS Kids); Daniel Tiger's Neighborhood (PBS Kids); Donkey Hodie (PBS Kids); Odd Squad (PBS Kids); Win or Lose (Disney+); Wonder Pets: In the City (Apple TV+)
Heritage Award	Sesame Street	
Career Achievement Award	Kathy Bates	

=== Shows with multiple nominations ===
The following shows received multiple nominations:

Nominations	Recipient	Category	Network/Platform
5	Severance	Drama	Apple TV+
4	Adolescence	Drama	Netflix
4	Hacks	Comedy	HBO Max
4	The Pitt	Drama	HBO Max
4	The Studio	Comedy	Apple TV+
3	Andor	Drama	Disney+
3	Matlock	Drama	CBS
2	Dying for Sex	Comedy	FX
2	Interview with the Vampire	Drama	AMC
2	Nobody Wants This	Comedy	Netflix
2	The Rehearsal	Comedy	HBO
2	Shrinking	Comedy	Apple TV+
2	Somebody Somewhere	Comedy	HBO
2	The White Lotus	Drama	HBO

=== Shows with multiple wins ===
The following shows received multiple wins:

Wins	Recipient	Category	Network/Platform
4	The Pitt	Drama	HBO Max
2	Sesame Street	Children's Programming	HBO Max
