= Actor Award for Outstanding Performance by a Cast in a Motion Picture =

U.S. film award

- Awarded for: Outstanding Performance by an Ensemble in a Motion Picture
- Location: Los Angeles, California
- Presented by: SAG-AFTRA
- Currently held by: Sinners (2025)
- Website: actorawards.org

The Actor Award for Outstanding Performance by a Cast (or Ensemble) in a Motion Picture (formerly Screen Actors Guild Award for Outstanding Performance by a Cast in a Motion Picture) is an award given by the Screen Actors Guild to honor the finest acting achievements in film. It is the final award presented during the ceremony.

== Eligibility ==
In order for an individual actor to be eligible for an award as part of the cast, they must be credited with a single-card billing in the movie's main titles, although exceptions can be made at the discretion of the awards committee in cases of "special, unusual, or non-billing".

== Winners and nominees ==
indicates the winners.

=== 1990s ===
Year	Film	Cast members
1995 (2nd)	Apollo 13	Kevin Bacon, Tom Hanks, Ed Harris, Bill Paxton, Kathleen Quinlan, Gary Sinise
1995 (2nd)	Get Shorty	Danny DeVito, Dennis Farina, James Gandolfini, Gene Hackman, Delroy Lindo, David Paymer, Rene Russo, John Travolta
1995 (2nd)	How to Make an American Quilt	Maya Angelou, Anne Bancroft, Ellen Burstyn, Samantha Mathis, Kate Nelligan, Winona Ryder, Jean Simmons, Lois Smith, Alfre Woodard
1995 (2nd)	Nixon	Joan Allen, Brian Bedford, Powers Boothe, Kevin Dunn, Fyvush Finkel, Annabeth Gish, Tony Goldwyn, Larry Hagman, Ed Harris, Edward Herrmann, Anthony Hopkins, Bob Hoskins, Madeline Kahn, E. G. Marshall, David Paymer, David Hyde Pierce, Paul Sorvino, Mary Steenburgen, J. T. Walsh, James Woods
1995 (2nd)	Sense and Sensibility	Hugh Grant, Alan Rickman, Emma Thompson, Kate Winslet
1996 (3rd)	The Birdcage	Hank Azaria, Christine Baranski, Dan Futterman, Gene Hackman, Nathan Lane, Dianne Wiest, Robin Williams
1996 (3rd)	The English Patient	Naveen Andrews, Juliette Binoche, Willem Dafoe, Ralph Fiennes, Colin Firth, Jürgen Prochnow, Kristin Scott Thomas, Julian Wadham
1996 (3rd)	Marvin's Room	Hume Cronyn, Robert De Niro, Leonardo DiCaprio, Dan Hedaya, Diane Keaton, Hal Scardino, Meryl Streep, Gwen Verdon
1996 (3rd)	Shine	John Gielgud, Armin Mueller-Stahl, Lynn Redgrave, Geoffrey Rush, Noah Taylor, Googie Withers
1996 (3rd)	Sling Blade	Lucas Black, Natalie Canerday, Robert Duvall, James Hampton, John Ritter, Billy Bob Thornton, J. T. Walsh, Dwight Yoakam
1997 (4th)	The Full Monty	Mark Addy, Paul Barber, Robert Carlyle, Deirdre Costello, Steve Huison, Bruce Jones, Lesley Sharp, William Snape, Hugo Speer, Tom Wilkinson, Emily Woof
1997 (4th)	Boogie Nights	Don Cheadle, Heather Graham, Luis Guzmán, Philip Baker Hall, Philip Seymour Hoffman, Thomas Jane, Ricky Jay, William H. Macy, Alfred Molina, Julianne Moore, Nicole Ari Parker, John C. Reilly, Burt Reynolds, Robert Ridgely, Mark Wahlberg, Melora Walters
1997 (4th)	Good Will Hunting	Ben Affleck, Matt Damon, Minnie Driver, Stellan Skarsgård, Robin Williams
1997 (4th)	L.A. Confidential	Kim Basinger, James Cromwell, Russell Crowe, Danny DeVito, Guy Pearce, Kevin Spacey, David Strathairn
1997 (4th)	Titanic	Suzy Amis, Kathy Bates, Leonardo DiCaprio, Frances Fisher, Bernard Fox, Victor Garber, Bernard Hill, Jonathan Hyde, Danny Nucci, Bill Paxton, Gloria Stuart, David Warner, Kate Winslet, Billy Zane
1998 (5th)	Shakespeare in Love	Ben Affleck, Simon Callow, Jim Carter, Martin Clunes, Judi Dench, Joseph Fiennes, Colin Firth, Gwyneth Paltrow, Geoffrey Rush, Antony Sher, Imelda Staunton, Tom Wilkinson, Mark Williams
1998 (5th)	Life Is Beautiful (La vita è bella)	Roberto Benigni, Nicoletta Braschi, Horst Buchholz, Sergio Bini Bustric, Giorgio Cantarini, Giustino Durano, Amerigo Fontani, Giuliana Lojodice, Marisa Paredes
1998 (5th)	Little Voice	Annette Badland, Brenda Blethyn, Jim Broadbent, Michael Caine, Jane Horrocks, Philip Jackson, Ewan McGregor
1998 (5th)	Saving Private Ryan	Edward Burns, Matt Damon, Jeremy Davies, Vin Diesel, Adam Goldberg, Tom Hanks, Barry Pepper, Giovanni Ribisi, Tom Sizemore
1998 (5th)	Waking Ned Devine	Ian Bannen, Fionnula Flanagan, David Kelly, Susan Lynch, James Nesbitt
1999 (6th)	American Beauty	Annette Bening, Wes Bentley, Thora Birch, Chris Cooper, Peter Gallagher, Allison Janney, Kevin Spacey, Mena Suvari
1999 (6th)	Being John Malkovich	Orson Bean, John Cusack, Cameron Diaz, Catherine Keener, John Malkovich, Mary Kay Place, Charlie Sheen
1999 (6th)	The Cider House Rules	Jane Alexander, Erykah Badu, Kathy Baker, Michael Caine, Kieran Culkin, Delroy Lindo, Tobey Maguire, Kate Nelligan, Paul Rudd, Charlize Theron
1999 (6th)	The Green Mile	Patricia Clarkson, James Cromwell, Jeffrey DeMunn, Michael Clarke Duncan, Graham Greene, Tom Hanks, Bonnie Hunt, Doug Hutchison, Michael Jeter, David Morse, Barry Pepper, Sam Rockwell, Harry Dean Stanton
1999 (6th)	Magnolia	Jeremy Blackman, Tom Cruise, Melinda Dillon, April Grace, Luis Guzmán, Philip Baker Hall, Philip Seymour Hoffman, Ricky Jay, William H. Macy, Alfred Molina, Julianne Moore, Michael Murphy, John C. Reilly, Jason Robards, Melora Walters

=== 2000s ===
Year	Film	Cast members
2000 (7th)	Traffic	Steven Bauer, Benjamin Bratt, James Brolin, Don Cheadle, Erika Christensen, Clifton Collins Jr., Benicio del Toro, Michael Douglas, Miguel Ferrer, Albert Finney, Topher Grace, Luis Guzmán, Amy Irving, Tomas Milian, D. W. Moffett, Dennis Quaid, Peter Riegert, Jacob Vargas, Catherine Zeta-Jones
2000 (7th)	Almost Famous	Fairuza Balk, Billy Crudup, Patrick Fugit, Philip Seymour Hoffman, Kate Hudson, Jason Lee, Frances McDormand, Anna Paquin, Noah Taylor
2000 (7th)	Billy Elliot	Jamie Bell, Jamie Draven, Gary Lewis, Julie Walters
2000 (7th)	Chocolat	Juliette Binoche, Leslie Caron, Judi Dench, Johnny Depp, Alfred Molina, Carrie-Anne Moss, Hugh O'Conor, Lena Olin, Peter Stormare, John Wood
2000 (7th)	Gladiator	Russell Crowe, Richard Harris, Djimon Hounsou, Derek Jacobi, Connie Nielsen, Joaquin Phoenix, Oliver Reed
2001 (8th)	Gosford Park	Eileen Atkins, Bob Balaban, Alan Bates, Charles Dance, Stephen Fry, Michael Gambon, Richard E. Grant, Tom Hollander, Derek Jacobi, Kelly Macdonald, Helen Mirren, Jeremy Northam, Clive Owen, Ryan Phillippe, Kristin Scott Thomas, Maggie Smith, Geraldine Somerville, Sophie Thompson, Emily Watson, James Wilby
2001 (8th)	A Beautiful Mind	Paul Bettany, Jennifer Connelly, Russell Crowe, Adam Goldberg, Jason Gray-Stanford, Ed Harris, Judd Hirsch, Josh Lucas, Austin Pendleton, Christopher Plummer, Anthony Rapp
2001 (8th)	In the Bedroom	William Mapother, Sissy Spacek, Nick Stahl, Marisa Tomei, Celia Weston, Tom Wilkinson, William Wise
2001 (8th)	The Lord of the Rings: The Fellowship of the Ring	Sean Astin, Sean Bean, Cate Blanchett, Orlando Bloom, Billy Boyd, Ian Holm, Christopher Lee, Ian McKellen, Dominic Monaghan, Viggo Mortensen, John Rhys-Davies, Andy Serkis, Liv Tyler, Hugo Weaving, Elijah Wood
2001 (8th)	Moulin Rouge!	Jim Broadbent, Nicole Kidman, John Leguizamo, Ewan McGregor, Richard Roxburgh
2002 (9th)	Chicago	Christine Baranski, Ekaterina Chtchelkanova, Taye Diggs, Denise Faye, Colm Feore, Richard Gere, Deidre Goodwin, Queen Latifah, Lucy Liu, Susan Misner, Mýa, John C. Reilly, Dominic West, Renée Zellweger, Catherine Zeta-Jones
2002 (9th)	Adaptation.	Nicolas Cage, Chris Cooper, Brian Cox, Cara Seymour, Meryl Streep, Tilda Swinton
2002 (9th)	The Hours	Toni Collette, Claire Danes, Jeff Daniels, Stephen Dillane, Ed Harris, Allison Janney, Nicole Kidman, Julianne Moore, John C. Reilly, Miranda Richardson, Meryl Streep
2002 (9th)	The Lord of the Rings: The Two Towers	Sean Astin, Cate Blanchett, Orlando Bloom, Billy Boyd, Brad Dourif, Bernard Hill, Christopher Lee, Ian McKellen, Dominic Monaghan, Viggo Mortensen, Miranda Otto, John Rhys-Davies, Andy Serkis, Liv Tyler, Karl Urban, Hugo Weaving, David Wenham, Elijah Wood
2002 (9th)	My Big Fat Greek Wedding	Gia Carides, Michael Constantine, John Corbett, Joey Fatone, Lainie Kazan, Andrea Martin, Nia Vardalos
2003 (10th)	The Lord of the Rings: The Return of the King	Sean Astin, Sean Bean, Cate Blanchett, Orlando Bloom, Billy Boyd, Bernard Hill, Ian Holm, Ian McKellen, Dominic Monaghan, Viggo Mortensen, John Noble, Miranda Otto, John Rhys-Davies, Andy Serkis, Liv Tyler, Karl Urban, Hugo Weaving, David Wenham, Elijah Wood
2003 (10th)	In America	Emma Bolger, Sarah Bolger, Paddy Considine, Djimon Hounsou, Samantha Morton
2003 (10th)	Mystic River	Kevin Bacon, Laurence Fishburne, Marcia Gay Harden, Laura Linney, Sean Penn, Tim Robbins
2003 (10th)	Seabiscuit	Elizabeth Banks, Jeff Bridges, Chris Cooper, William H. Macy, Tobey Maguire, Gary Stevens
2003 (10th)	The Station Agent	Paul Benjamin, Bobby Cannavale, Patricia Clarkson, Peter Dinklage, Raven Goodwin, Michelle Williams
2004 (11th)	Sideways	Thomas Haden Church, Paul Giamatti, Virginia Madsen, Sandra Oh
2004 (11th)	The Aviator	Alan Alda, Alec Baldwin, Kate Beckinsale, Cate Blanchett, Leonardo DiCaprio, Ian Holm, Danny Huston, Jude Law, John C. Reilly, Gwen Stefani
2004 (11th)	Finding Neverland	Julie Christie, Johnny Depp, Freddie Highmore, Dustin Hoffman, Radha Mitchell, Joe Prospero, Nick Roud, Luke Spill, Kate Winslet
2004 (11th)	Hotel Rwanda	Don Cheadle, Nick Nolte, Sophie Okonedo, Joaquin Phoenix
2004 (11th)	Million Dollar Baby	Clint Eastwood, Morgan Freeman, Hilary Swank
2004 (11th)	Ray	Aunjanue Ellis-Taylor, Jamie Foxx, Terrence Howard, Regina King, Harry J. Lennix, Clifton Powell, Larenz Tate, Kerry Washington
2005 (12th)	Crash	Chris "Ludacris" Bridges, Sandra Bullock, Don Cheadle, Matt Dillon, Jennifer Esposito, William Fichtner, Brendan Fraser, Terrence Howard, Thandie Newton, Ryan Phillippe, Larenz Tate
2005 (12th)	Brokeback Mountain	Linda Cardellini, Anna Faris, Jake Gyllenhaal, Anne Hathaway, Heath Ledger, Randy Quaid, Michelle Williams
2005 (12th)	Capote	Bob Balaban, Marshall Bell, Clifton Collins Jr., Chris Cooper, Bruce Greenwood, Philip Seymour Hoffman, Catherine Keener, Mark Pellegrino
2005 (12th)	Good Night, and Good Luck.	Rose Abdoo, Alex Borstein, Robert John Burke, Patricia Clarkson, George Clooney, Jeff Daniels, Reed Diamond, Tate Donovan, Robert Downey Jr., Grant Heslov, Peter Jacobson, Frank Langella, Tom McCarthy, Dianne Reeves, Matt Ross, David Strathairn, Ray Wise
2005 (12th)	Hustle & Flow	Anthony Anderson, Christopher "Ludacris" Bridges, Isaac Hayes, Taraji P. Henson, Terrence Howard, Taryn Manning, Elise Neal, Paula Jai Parker, DJ Qualls
2006 (13th)	Little Miss Sunshine	Alan Arkin, Abigail Breslin, Steve Carell, Toni Collette, Paul Dano, Greg Kinnear
2006 (13th)	Babel	Adriana Barraza, Gael García Bernal, Cate Blanchett, Rinko Kikuchi, Brad Pitt, Kōji Yakusho
2006 (13th)	Bobby	Harry Belafonte, Joy Bryant, Nick Cannon, Emilio Estevez, Laurence Fishburne, Brian Geraghty, Heather Graham, Anthony Hopkins, Helen Hunt, Joshua Jackson, David Krumholtz, Ashton Kutcher, Shia LaBeouf, Lindsay Lohan, William H. Macy, Svetlana Metkina, Demi Moore, Freddy Rodriguez, Martin Sheen, Christian Slater, Sharon Stone, Jacob Vargas, Mary Elizabeth Winstead, Elijah Wood
2006 (13th)	The Departed	Anthony Anderson, Alec Baldwin, Matt Damon, Leonardo DiCaprio, Vera Farmiga, Jack Nicholson, Martin Sheen, Mark Wahlberg, Ray Winstone
2006 (13th)	Dreamgirls	Hinton Battle, Jamie Foxx, Danny Glover, Jennifer Hudson, Beyoncé, Sharon Leal, Eddie Murphy, Keith Robinson, Anika Noni Rose
2007 (14th)	No Country for Old Men	Javier Bardem, Josh Brolin, Garret Dillahunt, Tess Harper, Woody Harrelson, Tommy Lee Jones, Kelly Macdonald
2007 (14th)	3:10 to Yuma	Christian Bale, Russell Crowe, Peter Fonda, Ben Foster, Logan Lerman, Gretchen Mol, Dallas Roberts, Vinessa Shaw, Alan Tudyk
2007 (14th)	American Gangster	Armand Assante, Josh Brolin, Russell Crowe, Ruby Dee, Chiwetel Ejiofor, Idris Elba, Cuba Gooding Jr., Carla Gugino, John Hawkes, Ted Levine, Joe Morton, Lymari Nadal, John Ortiz, RZA, Yul Vazquez, Denzel Washington
2007 (14th)	Hairspray	Nikki Blonsky, Amanda Bynes, Paul Dooley, Zac Efron, Allison Janney, Elijah Kelley, Queen Latifah, James Marsden, Michelle Pfeiffer, Brittany Snow, Jerry Stiller, John Travolta, Christopher Walken
2007 (14th)	Into the Wild	Brian H. Dierker, Marcia Gay Harden, Emile Hirsch, Hal Holbrook, William Hurt, Catherine Keener, Jena Malone, Kristen Stewart, Vince Vaughn
2008 (15th)	Slumdog Millionaire	Rubina Ali, Tanay Hemant Chheda, Ashutosh Lobo Gajiwala, Azharuddin Mohammed Ismail, Anil Kapoor, Irrfan Khan, Ayush Mahesh Khedekar, Tanvi Ganesh Lonkar, Madhur Mittal, Dev Patel, Freida Pinto
2008 (15th)	The Curious Case of Benjamin Button	Mahershala Ali, Cate Blanchett, Jason Flemyng, Jared Harris, Taraji P. Henson, Elias Koteas, Julia Ormond, Brad Pitt, Phyllis Somerville, Tilda Swinton
2008 (15th)	Doubt	Amy Adams, Viola Davis, Philip Seymour Hoffman, Meryl Streep
2008 (15th)	Frost/Nixon	Kevin Bacon, Rebecca Hall, Toby Jones, Frank Langella, Matthew Macfadyen, Oliver Platt, Sam Rockwell, Michael Sheen
2008 (15th)	Milk	Josh Brolin, Joseph Cross, James Franco, Victor Garber, Emile Hirsch, Diego Luna, Denis O'Hare, Sean Penn, Alison Pill
2009 (16th)	Inglourious Basterds	Daniel Brühl, August Diehl, Julie Dreyfus, Michael Fassbender, Sylvester Groth, Jacky Ido, Diane Kruger, Mélanie Laurent, Denis Menochet, Mike Myers, Brad Pitt, Eli Roth, Til Schweiger, Rod Taylor, Christoph Waltz, Martin Wuttke
2009 (16th)	An Education	Dominic Cooper, Alfred Molina, Carey Mulligan, Rosamund Pike, Peter Sarsgaard, Emma Thompson, Olivia Williams
2009 (16th)	The Hurt Locker	Christian Camargo, Brian Geraghty, Evangeline Lilly, Anthony Mackie, Jeremy Renner
2009 (16th)	Nine	Marion Cotillard, Penélope Cruz, Daniel Day-Lewis, Judi Dench, Fergie, Kate Hudson, Nicole Kidman, Sophia Loren
2009 (16th)	Precious	Mariah Carey, Lenny Kravitz, Mo'Nique, Paula Patton, Sherri Shepherd, Gabourey Sidibe

=== 2010s ===
Year	Film	Cast members
2010 (17th)	The King's Speech	Anthony Andrews, Helena Bonham Carter, Jennifer Ehle, Colin Firth, Michael Gambon, Derek Jacobi, Guy Pearce, Geoffrey Rush, Timothy Spall
2010 (17th)	Black Swan	Vincent Cassel, Barbara Hershey, Mila Kunis, Natalie Portman, Winona Ryder
2010 (17th)	The Fighter	Amy Adams, Christian Bale, Melissa Leo, Jack McGee, Mark Wahlberg
2010 (17th)	The Kids Are All Right	Annette Bening, Josh Hutcherson, Julianne Moore, Mark Ruffalo, Mia Wasikowska
2010 (17th)	The Social Network	Jesse Eisenberg, Andrew Garfield, Armie Hammer, Max Minghella, Josh Pence, Justin Timberlake
2011 (18th)	The Help	Jessica Chastain, Viola Davis, Bryce Dallas Howard, Allison Janney, Chris Lowell, Ahna O'Reilly, Sissy Spacek, Octavia Spencer, Mary Steenburgen, Emma Stone, Cicely Tyson, Mike Vogel
2011 (18th)	The Artist	Bérénice Bejo, James Cromwell, Jean Dujardin, John Goodman, Penelope Ann Miller
2011 (18th)	Bridesmaids	Rose Byrne, Jill Clayburgh, Ellie Kemper, Matt Lucas, Melissa McCarthy, Wendi McLendon-Covey, Chris O'Dowd, Maya Rudolph, Rebel Wilson, Kristen Wiig
2011 (18th)	The Descendants	Beau Bridges, George Clooney, Robert Forster, Judy Greer, Matthew Lillard, Shailene Woodley
2011 (18th)	Midnight in Paris	Kathy Bates, Adrien Brody, Carla Bruni, Marion Cotillard, Rachel McAdams, Michael Sheen, Owen Wilson
2012 (19th)	Argo	Ben Affleck, Alan Arkin, Kerry Bishé, Kyle Chandler, Rory Cochrane, Bryan Cranston, Christopher Denham, Tate Donovan, Clea DuVall, Victor Garber, John Goodman, Scoot McNairy, Chris Messina
2012 (19th)	The Best Exotic Marigold Hotel	Judi Dench, Celia Imrie, Bill Nighy, Dev Patel, Ronald Pickup, Maggie Smith, Tom Wilkinson, Penelope Wilton
2012 (19th)	Les Misérables	Isabelle Allen, Samantha Barks, Sacha Baron Cohen, Helena Bonham Carter, Russell Crowe, Anne Hathaway, Daniel Huttlestone, Hugh Jackman, Eddie Redmayne, Amanda Seyfried, Aaron Tveit, Colm Wilkinson
2012 (19th)	Lincoln	Daniel Day-Lewis, Sally Field, Joseph Gordon-Levitt, Hal Holbrook, Tommy Lee Jones, James Spader, David Strathairn
2012 (19th)	Silver Linings Playbook	Bradley Cooper, Robert De Niro, Anupam Kher, Jennifer Lawrence, Chris Tucker, Jacki Weaver
2013 (20th)	American Hustle	Amy Adams, Christian Bale, Louis C.K., Bradley Cooper, Paul Herman, Jack Huston, Jennifer Lawrence, Alessandro Nivola, Michael Peña, Jeremy Renner, Elisabeth Röhm, Shea Whigham
2013 (20th)	12 Years a Slave	Benedict Cumberbatch, Paul Dano, Garret Dillahunt, Chiwetel Ejiofor, Michael Fassbender, Paul Giamatti, Scoot McNairy, Lupita Nyong'o, Adepero Oduye, Sarah Paulson, Brad Pitt, Michael Kenneth Williams, Alfre Woodard
2013 (20th)	August: Osage County	Abigail Breslin, Chris Cooper, Benedict Cumberbatch, Juliette Lewis, Margo Martindale, Ewan McGregor, Dermot Mulroney, Julianne Nicholson, Julia Roberts, Sam Shepard, Meryl Streep, Misty Upham
2013 (20th)	The Butler	Mariah Carey, John Cusack, Jane Fonda, Cuba Gooding Jr., Terrence Howard, Lenny Kravitz, James Marsden, David Oyelowo, Alex Pettyfer, Vanessa Redgrave, Alan Rickman, Liev Schreiber, Forest Whitaker, Robin Williams, Oprah Winfrey
2013 (20th)	Dallas Buyers Club	Jennifer Garner, Jared Leto, Matthew McConaughey, Denis O'Hare, Dallas Roberts, Steve Zahn
2014 (21st)	Birdman	Zach Galifianakis, Michael Keaton, Edward Norton, Andrea Riseborough, Amy Ryan, Emma Stone, Naomi Watts
2014 (21st)	Boyhood	Patricia Arquette, Ellar Coltrane, Ethan Hawke, Lorelei Linklater
2014 (21st)	The Grand Budapest Hotel	F. Murray Abraham, Mathieu Amalric, Adrien Brody, Willem Dafoe, Ralph Fiennes, Jeff Goldblum, Harvey Keitel, Jude Law, Bill Murray, Edward Norton, Tony Revolori, Saoirse Ronan, Jason Schwartzman, Léa Seydoux, Tilda Swinton, Tom Wilkinson, Owen Wilson
2014 (21st)	The Imitation Game	Matthew Beard, Benedict Cumberbatch, Charles Dance, Matthew Goode, Rory Kinnear, Keira Knightley, Allen Leech, Mark Strong
2014 (21st)	The Theory of Everything	Charlie Cox, Felicity Jones, Simon McBurney, Eddie Redmayne, David Thewlis, Emily Watson
2015 (22nd)	Spotlight	Billy Crudup, Brian d'Arcy James, Michael Keaton, Rachel McAdams, Mark Ruffalo, Liev Schreiber, John Slattery, Stanley Tucci
2015 (22nd)	Beasts of No Nation	Abraham Attah, Kurt Egyiawan, Idris Elba
2015 (22nd)	The Big Short	Christian Bale, Steve Carell, Ryan Gosling, Melissa Leo, Hamish Linklater, John Magaro, Brad Pitt, Rafe Spall, Jeremy Strong, Marisa Tomei, Finn Wittrock
2015 (22nd)	Straight Outta Compton	Neil Brown Jr., Paul Giamatti, Corey Hawkins, Aldis Hodge, O'Shea Jackson Jr., Jason Mitchell
2015 (22nd)	Trumbo	Adewale Akinnuoye-Agbaje, Louis C.K., Bryan Cranston, David James Elliott, Elle Fanning, John Goodman, Diane Lane, Helen Mirren, Michael Stuhlbarg, Alan Tudyk
2016 (23rd)	Hidden Figures	Mahershala Ali, Kevin Costner, Kirsten Dunst, Taraji P. Henson, Aldis Hodge, Janelle Monáe, Jim Parsons, Glen Powell, Octavia Spencer
2016 (23rd)	Captain Fantastic	Annalise Basso, Shree Crooks, Ann Dowd, Kathryn Hahn, Nicholas Hamilton, Samantha Isler, Frank Langella, George MacKay, Erin Moriarty, Viggo Mortensen, Missi Pyle, Charlie Shotwell, Steve Zahn
2016 (23rd)	Fences	Jovan Adepo, Viola Davis, Stephen McKinley Henderson, Russell Hornsby, Saniyya Sidney, Denzel Washington, Mykelti Williamson
2016 (23rd)	Manchester by the Sea	Casey Affleck, Matthew Broderick, Kyle Chandler, Lucas Hedges, Gretchen Mol, Michelle Williams
2016 (23rd)	Moonlight	Mahershala Ali, Naomie Harris, André Holland, Jharrel Jerome, Janelle Monáe, Trevante Rhodes, Ashton Sanders
2017 (24th)	Three Billboards Outside Ebbing, Missouri	Abbie Cornish, Peter Dinklage, Woody Harrelson, John Hawkes, Lucas Hedges, Željko Ivanek, Caleb Landry Jones, Frances McDormand, Clarke Peters, Sam Rockwell, Samara Weaving
2017 (24th)	The Big Sick	Adeel Akhtar, Holly Hunter, Zoe Kazan, Anupam Kher, Kumail Nanjiani, Ray Romano, Zenobia Shroff
2017 (24th)	Get Out	Caleb Landry Jones, Daniel Kaluuya, Catherine Keener, Stephen Root, Lakeith Stanfield, Bradley Whitford, Allison Williams
2017 (24th)	Lady Bird	Timothée Chalamet, Beanie Feldstein, Lucas Hedges, Tracy Letts, Stephen McKinley Henderson, Laurie Metcalf, Jordan Rodrigues, Saoirse Ronan, Odeya Rush, Marielle Scott, Lois Smith
2017 (24th)	Mudbound	Jonathan Banks, Mary J. Blige, Jason Clarke, Garrett Hedlund, Jason Mitchell, Rob Morgan, Carey Mulligan
2018 (25th)	Black Panther	Angela Bassett, Chadwick Boseman, Sterling K. Brown, Winston Duke, Martin Freeman, Danai Gurira, Michael B. Jordan, Daniel Kaluuya, Lupita Nyong'o, Andy Serkis, Forest Whitaker, Letitia Wright
2018 (25th)	BlacKkKlansman	Harry Belafonte, Adam Driver, Topher Grace, Laura Harrier, Corey Hawkins, John David Washington
2018 (25th)	Bohemian Rhapsody	Lucy Boynton, Aidan Gillen, Ben Hardy, Tom Hollander, Gwilym Lee, Allen Leech, Rami Malek, Joe Mazzello, Mike Myers
2018 (25th)	Crazy Rich Asians	Awkwafina, Gemma Chan, Henry Golding, Ken Jeong, Lisa Lu, Harry Shum Jr., Constance Wu, Michelle Yeoh
2018 (25th)	A Star Is Born	Dave Chappelle, Andrew Dice Clay, Bradley Cooper, Sam Elliott, Rafi Gavron, Lady Gaga, Anthony Ramos
2019 (26th)	Parasite (기생충)	Cho Yeo-jeong, Choi Woo-shik, Jang Hye-jin, Jung Hyun-joon, Jung Ziso, Lee Jung-eun, Lee Sun-kyun, Park Myung-hoon, Park So-dam, Song Kang-ho
2019 (26th)	Bombshell	Connie Britton, Allison Janney, Nicole Kidman, John Lithgow, Malcolm McDowell, Kate McKinnon, Margot Robbie, Charlize Theron
2019 (26th)	The Irishman	Bobby Cannavale, Robert De Niro, Stephen Graham, Harvey Keitel, Al Pacino, Anna Paquin, Joe Pesci, Ray Romano
2019 (26th)	Jojo Rabbit	Alfie Allen, Roman Griffin Davis, Scarlett Johansson, Thomasin McKenzie, Stephen Merchant, Sam Rockwell, Taika Waititi, Rebel Wilson
2019 (26th)	Once Upon a Time in Hollywood	Austin Butler, Julia Butters, Bruce Dern, Leonardo DiCaprio, Dakota Fanning, Emile Hirsch, Damian Lewis, Mike Moh, Timothy Olyphant, Al Pacino, Luke Perry, Brad Pitt, Margaret Qualley, Margot Robbie

=== 2020s ===
Year	Film	Cast members
2020 (27th)	The Trial of the Chicago 7	Yahya Abdul-Mateen II, Sacha Baron Cohen, Joseph Gordon-Levitt, Kelvin Harrison Jr., Michael Keaton, Frank Langella, John Carroll Lynch, Eddie Redmayne, Mark Rylance, Alex Sharp, Jeremy Strong
2020 (27th)	Da 5 Bloods	Chadwick Boseman, Paul Walter Hauser, Nguyễn Ngọc Lâm, Lê Y Lan, Norm Lewis, Delroy Lindo, Jonathan Majors, Van Veronica Ngo, Johnny Trí Nguyễn, Jasper Pääkkönen, Clarke Peters, Sandy Hương Phạm, Jean Reno, Mélanie Thierry, Isiah Whitlock Jr.
2020 (27th)	Ma Rainey's Black Bottom	Chadwick Boseman, Jonny Coyne, Viola Davis, Colman Domingo, Michael Potts, Glynn Turman
2020 (27th)	Minari	Noel Kate Cho, Han Ye-ri, Scott Haze, Alan Kim, Will Patton, Steven Yeun, Youn Yuh-jung
2020 (27th)	One Night in Miami...	Kingsley Ben-Adir, Beau Bridges, Lawrence Gilliard Jr., Eli Goree, Aldis Hodge, Michael Imperioli, Joaquina Kalukango, Leslie Odom Jr., Lance Reddick, Nicolette Robinson
2021 (28th)	CODA	Eugenio Derbez, Daniel Durant, Emilia Jones, Troy Kotsur, Marlee Matlin, Ferdia Walsh-Peelo
2021 (28th)	Belfast	Caitríona Balfe, Judi Dench, Jamie Dornan, Jude Hill, Ciarán Hinds, Colin Morgan
2021 (28th)	Don't Look Up	Cate Blanchett, Timothée Chalamet, Leonardo DiCaprio, Ariana Grande, Jonah Hill, Jennifer Lawrence, Melanie Lynskey, Scott Mescudi, Rob Morgan, Himesh Patel, Ron Perlman, Tyler Perry, Mark Rylance, Meryl Streep
2021 (28th)	House of Gucci	Adam Driver, Lady Gaga, Salma Hayek, Jack Huston, Jeremy Irons, Jared Leto, Al Pacino
2021 (28th)	King Richard	Jon Bernthal, Aunjanue Ellis-Taylor, Tony Goldwyn, Saniyya Sidney, Demi Singleton, Will Smith
2022 (29th)	Everything Everywhere All at Once	Jamie Lee Curtis, James Hong, Stephanie Hsu, Ke Huy Quan, Harry Shum Jr., Jenny Slate, Michelle Yeoh
2022 (29th)	Babylon	Jovan Adepo, P.J. Byrne, Diego Calva, Lukas Haas, Olivia Hamilton, Li Jun Li, Tobey Maguire, Max Minghella, Brad Pitt, Margot Robbie, Rory Scovel, Jean Smart, Katherine Waterston
2022 (29th)	The Banshees of Inisherin	Kerry Condon, Colin Farrell, Brendan Gleeson, Barry Keoghan
2022 (29th)	The Fabelmans	Jeannie Berlin, Paul Dano, Judd Hirsch, Gabriel LaBelle, David Lynch, Seth Rogen, Michelle Williams
2022 (29th)	Women Talking	Jessie Buckley, Claire Foy, Kate Hallett, Judith Ivey, Rooney Mara, Sheila McCarthy, Frances McDormand, Michelle McLeod, Liv McNeil, Ben Whishaw, August Winter
2023 (30th)	Oppenheimer	Casey Affleck, Emily Blunt, Kenneth Branagh, Matt Damon, Robert Downey Jr., Josh Hartnett, Rami Malek, Cillian Murphy, Florence Pugh
2023 (30th)	American Fiction	Erika Alexander, Adam Brody, Sterling K. Brown, Keith David, John Ortiz, Issa Rae, Tracee Ellis Ross, Leslie Uggams, Jeffrey Wright
2023 (30th)	Barbie	Michael Cera, Will Ferrell, America Ferrera, Ryan Gosling, Ariana Greenblatt, Kate McKinnon, Helen Mirren, Rhea Perlman, Issa Rae, Margot Robbie
2023 (30th)	The Color Purple	Halle Bailey, Fantasia Barrino, Jon Batiste, Danielle Brooks, Ciara, Colman Domingo, Aunjanue Ellis-Taylor, Louis Gossett Jr., Corey Hawkins, Taraji P. Henson, Phylicia Pearl Mpasi, Gabriella Wilson "H.E.R."
2023 (30th)	Killers of the Flower Moon	Tantoo Cardinal, Robert De Niro, Leonardo DiCaprio, Brendan Fraser, Lily Gladstone, John Lithgow, Jesse Plemons
2024 (31st)	Conclave	Sergio Castellitto, Ralph Fiennes, John Lithgow, Lucian Msamati, Isabella Rossellini, Stanley Tucci
2024 (31st)	Anora	Yura Borisov, Mark Eydelshteyn, Karren Karagulian, Mikey Madison, Aleksei Serebryakov, Vache Tovmasyan
2024 (31st)	A Complete Unknown	Monica Barbaro, Norbert Leo Butz, Timothée Chalamet, Elle Fanning, Dan Fogler, Will Harrison, Eriko Hatsune, Boyd Holbrook, Scoot McNairy, Big Bill Morganfield, Edward Norton
2024 (31st)	Emilia Pérez	Karla Sofía Gascón, Selena Gomez, Adriana Paz, Zoe Saldaña
2024 (31st)	Wicked	Jonathan Bailey, Marissa Bode, Peter Dinklage, Cynthia Erivo, Jeff Goldblum, Ariana Grande, Ethan Slater, Bowen Yang, Michelle Yeoh
2025 (32nd)
2025 (32nd)	Sinners	Miles Caton, Buddy Guy, Michael B. Jordan, Jayme Lawson, Delroy Lindo, Omar Miller, Wunmi Mosaku, Jack O'Connell, Hailee Steinfeld
2025 (32nd)	Frankenstein	David Bradley, Christian Convery, Charles Dance, Jacob Elordi, Mia Goth, Oscar Isaac, Felix Kammerer, Lars Mikkelsen, Christoph Waltz
2025 (32nd)	Hamnet	Joe Alwyn, Jessie Buckley, Noah Jupe, Paul Mescal, Emily Watson
2025 (32nd)	Marty Supreme	Odessa A'zion, Sandra Bernhard, Timothée Chalamet, Emory Cohen, Fran Drescher, Abel Ferrara, Penn Jillette, Koto Kawaguchi, Luke Manley, Tyler Okonma, Kevin O'Leary, Gwyneth Paltrow, Geza Rohrig, Larry Sloman
2025 (32nd)	One Battle After Another	Benicio Del Toro, Leonardo DiCaprio, Regina Hall, Chase Infiniti, Sean Penn, Teyana Taylor

== Trivia ==
=== General ===
- The award was not given at the 1st Screen Actors Guild Awards.

=== Films ===
- The Full Monty, The Lord of the Rings: The Return of the King, and Parasite are the only winning films not to be nominated in any other category.
- Gosford Park has the largest winning cast (20 credited actors).
- Bobby has the largest nominated cast (24 credited actors).
- Sideways has the smallest winning cast (4 credited actors).
- Million Dollar Baby and Beasts of No Nation have the smallest nominated cast (3 credited actors).
- Doubt and The Banshees of Inisherin are the only ensembles to be nominated as a group in addition to individual nominations for each eligible actor.
- Parasite is the first non-English language film to win the award.
- The Birdcage is the only winning film not to be nominated for the Academy Award for Best Picture.
- Braveheart, The Shape of Water, Green Book, and Nomadland are the only films not to be nominated for the award and still go on to win the Academy Award for Best Picture.
- Out of the 31 winning films, 15 went on to win the Academy Award for Best Picture:
  - Shakespeare in Love
  - American Beauty
  - Chicago
  - The Lord of the Rings: The Return of the King
  - Crash
  - No Country for Old Men
  - Slumdog Millionaire
  - The King's Speech
  - Argo
  - Birdman
  - Spotlight
  - Parasite
  - CODA
  - Everything Everywhere All at Once
  - Oppenheimer
- Three non-English language films have been nominated:
  - Life Is Beautiful
  - Parasite
  - Emilia Pérez
- Eighteen nominated films were not nominated in any other category:
  - 3:10 to Yuma
  - Babylon
  - Bobby
  - Crazy Rich Asians
  - Don't Look Up
  - The Full Monty
  - Get Shorty
  - Hairspray
  - How to Make an American Quilt
  - Hustle & Flow
  - In America
  - The Lord of the Rings: The Return of the King
  - The Lord of the Rings: The Two Towers
  - Midnight in Paris
  - Moulin Rouge!
  - My Big Fat Greek Wedding
  - Parasite
  - Straight Outta Compton
  - Women Talking

=== Actors with the most nominations ===
8 nominations

- Leonardo DiCaprio

7 nominations

- Cate Blanchett
- Brad Pitt

6 nominations

- Russell Crowe
- Meryl Streep

5 nominations

- Chris Cooper
- Judi Dench
- Philip Seymour Hoffman
- Allison Janney
- John C. Reilly
- Tom Wilkinson

Note:

- Cate Blanchett has the most consecutive nominations (four, from 2001 to 2004).
- Despite having the most nominations with eight, Leonardo DiCaprio has never won the award.

=== Actors with double nominations in one year ===
- Ed Harris (1995, won for Apollo 13)
- David Paymer (1995)
- John C. Reilly (2002, won for Chicago)
- Meryl Streep (2002)
- Christopher "Ludacris" Bridges (2005, won for Crash)
- Terrence Howard (2005, won for Crash)
- Martin Sheen (2006)
- Josh Brolin (2007, won for No Country for Old Men)
- Russell Crowe (2007)
- Benedict Cumberbatch (2013)
- Edward Norton (2014, won for Birdman)
- Mahershala Ali (2016, won for Hidden Figures)
- Janelle Monáe (2016, won for Hidden Figures)
- Lucas Hedges (2017, won for Three Billboards Outside Ebbing, Missouri)
- Caleb Landry Jones (2017, won for Three Billboards Outside Ebbing, Missouri)
- Al Pacino (2019)
- Margot Robbie (2019)
- Chadwick Boseman (2020)
- Issa Rae (2023)

=== Actors with multiple wins ===
3 wins

- Michael Keaton: Birdman (2014), Spotlight (2015), The Trial of the Chicago 7 (2020)

2 wins

- Ben Affleck: Shakespeare in Love (1998), Argo (2012)
- Alan Arkin: Little Miss Sunshine (2006), Argo (2012)
- Christine Baranski: The Birdcage (1996), Chicago (2002)
- Don Cheadle: Traffic (2000), Crash (2005)
- Colin Firth: Shakespeare in Love (1998), The King's Speech (2010)
- Michael Gambon: Gosford Park (2001), The King's Speech (2010)
- Woody Harrelson: No Country for Old Men (2007), Three Billboards Outside Ebbing, Missouri (2017)
- Derek Jacobi: Gosford Park (2001), The King's Speech (2010)
- Allison Janney: American Beauty (1999), The Help (2011)
- Michael B. Jordan: Black Panther (2018), Sinners (2025)
- Kelly Macdonald: Gosford Park (2001), No Country for Old Men (2007)
- Ryan Phillippe: Gosford Park (2001), Crash (2005)
- Geoffrey Rush: Shakespeare in Love (1998), The King's Speech (2010)
- Andy Serkis: The Lord of the Rings: The Return of the King (2003), Black Panther (2018)
- Octavia Spencer: The Help (2011), Hidden Figures (2016)
- Emma Stone: The Help (2011), Birdman (2014)
- Stanley Tucci: Spotlight (2015), Conclave (2024)
- Tom Wilkinson: The Full Monty (1997), Shakespeare in Love (1998)
- Catherine Zeta-Jones: Traffic (2000), Chicago (2002)

=== Directors ===
- Ryan Coogler is the only director to direct multiple Best Cast winners: Black Panther (2018) and Sinners (2025)

=== Directors with multiple films nominated ===
Note: Winners are indicated in bold type.

4 nominations

- Martin Scorsese: The Aviator (2004), The Departed (2006), The Irishman (2019), Killers of the Flower Moon (2023)

3 nominations

- Paul Thomas Anderson: Boogie Nights (1997), Magnolia (1999), One Battle After Another (2025)
- Ron Howard: **Apollo 13 (1995)**, A Beautiful Mind (2001), Frost/Nixon (2008)
- Peter Jackson: The Lord of the Rings: The Fellowship of the Ring (2001), The Lord of the Rings: The Two Towers (2002), **The Lord of the Rings: The Return of the King (2003)**
- David O. Russell: The Fighter (2010), Silver Linings Playbook (2012), **American Hustle (2013)**
- Ridley Scott: Gladiator (2000), American Gangster (2007), House of Gucci (2021)
- Steven Spielberg: Saving Private Ryan (1998), Lincoln (2012), The Fabelmans (2022)

2 nominations

- John M. Chu: Crazy Rich Asians (2018), Wicked (2024)
- Ryan Coogler: **Black Panther (2018)**, **Sinners (2025)**
- Lee Daniels: Precious (2009), The Butler (2013)
- Stephen Daldry: Billy Elliott (2000), The Hours (2002)
- Clint Eastwood: Mystic River (2003), Million Dollar Baby (2004)
- David Fincher: The Curious Case of Benjamin Button (2008), The Social Network (2010)
- Greta Gerwig: Lady Bird (2017), Barbie (2023)
- Tom Hooper: **The King's Speech (2010)**, Les Miserables (2012)
- Alejandro González Iñárritu: Babel (2006), **Birdman (2014)**
- Spike Jonze: Being John Malkovich (1999), Adaptation. (2002)
- Ang Lee: Sense and Sensibility (1995), Brokeback Mountain (2005)
- Spike Lee: BlacKkKlansman (2018), Da 5 Bloods (2020)
- John Madden: **Shakespeare in Love (1998)**, The Best Exotic Marigold Hotel (2012)
- James Mangold: 3:10 to Yuma (2007), A Complete Unknown (2024)
- Rob Marshall: **Chicago (2002)**, Nine (2009)
- Adam McKay: The Big Short (2015), Don't Look Up (2021)
- Alexander Payne: **Sideways (2004),** The Descendants (2011)
- Jay Roach: Trumbo (2015), Bombshell (2019)
- Quentin Tarantino: **Inglorious Basterds (2009)**, Once Upon a Time in Hollywood (2019)
- Gus van Sant: Good Will Hunting (1997), Milk (2008)

== See also ==
- Academy Award for Best Picture
- Golden Globe Award for Best Motion Picture – Drama
- Golden Globe Award for Best Motion Picture – Musical or Comedy
- BAFTA Award for Best Film
- Critics' Choice Movie Award for Best Acting Ensemble
- Critics' Choice Movie Award for Best Picture
- Independent Spirit Award for Best Film
