= Muse (2019 film) =

- Directed by: Candida Brady
- Written by: Candida Brady
- Produced by: Candida Brady; Titus Ogilvy; Melloney Roffe; Yuriy Karnovsky; Nathan Moore; Jeff Rice
- Starring: Rupert Everett; Alison Doody; Derek Jacobi; Géza Röhrig
- Cinematography: Steve Robson
- Music by: Tobias Lilja
- Distributed by: Blenheim Films
- Release date: 18 October 2019
- Running time: 86 minutes
- Country: United Kingdom
- Language: English

Muse is a 2019 British psychological horror film written, directed and produced by Candida Brady and starring Rupert Everett, Alison Doody, Derek Jacobi and Géza Röhrig. It had its worldwide premiere on 18 October 2019.

== Premise ==
A hugely successful artist spirals into a depression following his new-found fortune and is tormented by his inner demons.

== Cast ==
- Géza Röhrig as Luca
- Rupert Everett as The Demon
- Alison Doody as Grace
- Derek Jacobi as The Lawyer
- Simon Godley as George
- Caroline Goodall as The Nurse
- Rupert Holliday-Evans as The Bailiff
- Jenni Murray as Herself
