= 32nd Actor Awards =

- Official poster
- Description: Outstanding motion picture and primetime television performances
- Date: March 1, 2026
- Location: Shrine Auditorium and Expo Hall, Los Angeles, California
- Country: United States
- Presented by: SAG-AFTRA
- Hosted by: Kristen Bell
- Preshow hosts: Paige DeSorbo; Scott Evans

Highlights
- Most awards: Film; Sinners (2); Television; The Studio (3)
- Most nominations: Film; One Battle After Another (7); Television; The Studio (5)
- Website: www.actorawards.org

Television/radio coverage
- Network: Netflix

The 32nd Actor Awards (formerly known as the Screen Actors Guild Awards), honoring the best achievements in film and television performances for the year 2025, were presented on March 1, 2026, at the Shrine Auditorium and Expo Hall in Los Angeles, California. For the third year in a row, the ceremony streamed live on Netflix, starting at 8:00 p.m. EST / 5:00 p.m. PST.

Actress Kristen Bell hosted the ceremony for the third time, after previously hosting in 2018 and 2025. (Note: Attributed to multiple references:)

Nominations were announced by Janelle James and Connor Storrie on January 7, 2026. One Battle After Another led with seven nominations, the most in Actor Awards history. At the age of 16, Owen Cooper became the youngest performer to win an individual award.

Harrison Ford was announced as the 2025 SAG-AFTRA Life Achievement Award recipient on December 18, 2025.

== Ceremony information ==
This was the first ceremony in which the awards were titled the "Actor Awards". The name change was announced on November 14, 2025. Per the official website, the "changing [of] its name [is] to better reflect its true spirit and position as the only industry honor given to actors, by actors". (Note: Attributed to multiple references:)

Evan Funke served as executive chef for the event.

== Winners and nominees ==
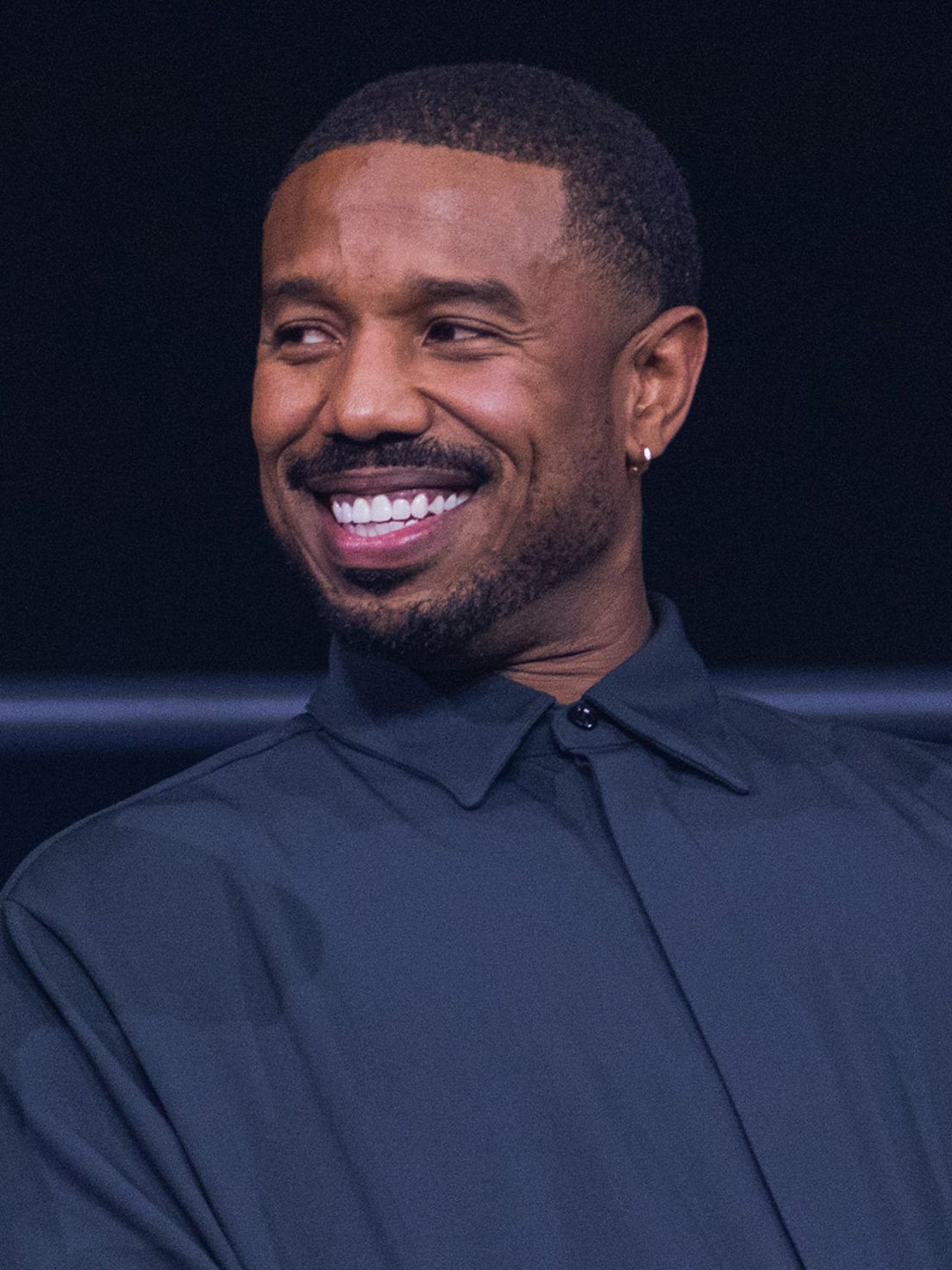
Michael B. Jordan, Outstanding Performance by a Male Actor in a Leading Role winner

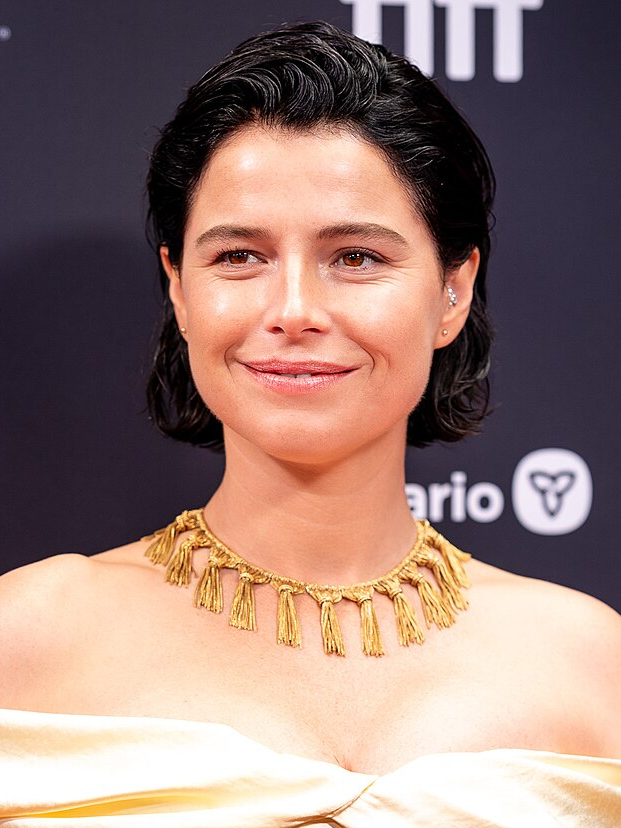
Jessie Buckley, Outstanding Performance by a Female Actor in a Leading Role winner

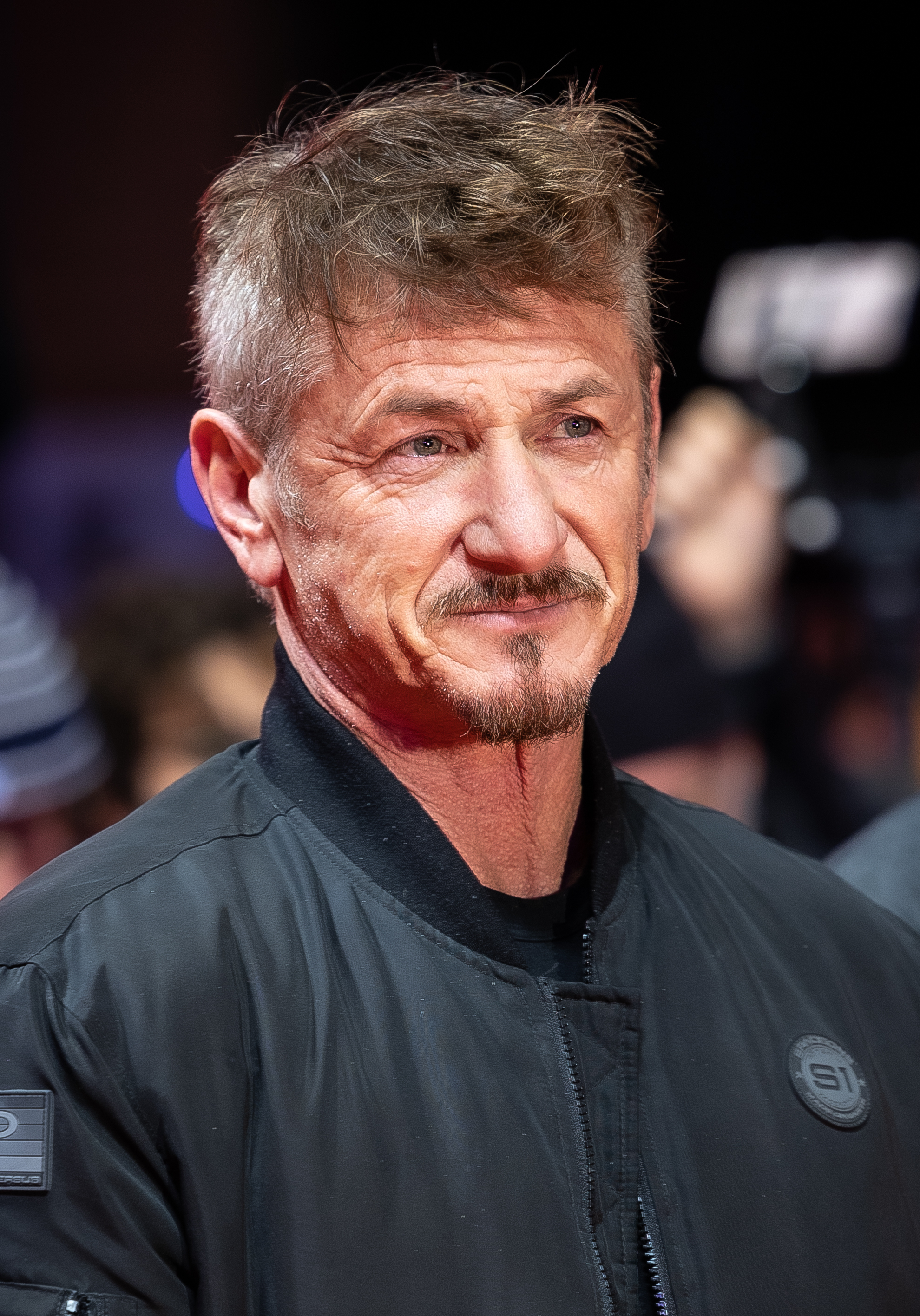
Sean Penn, Outstanding Performance by a Male Actor in a Supporting Role winner

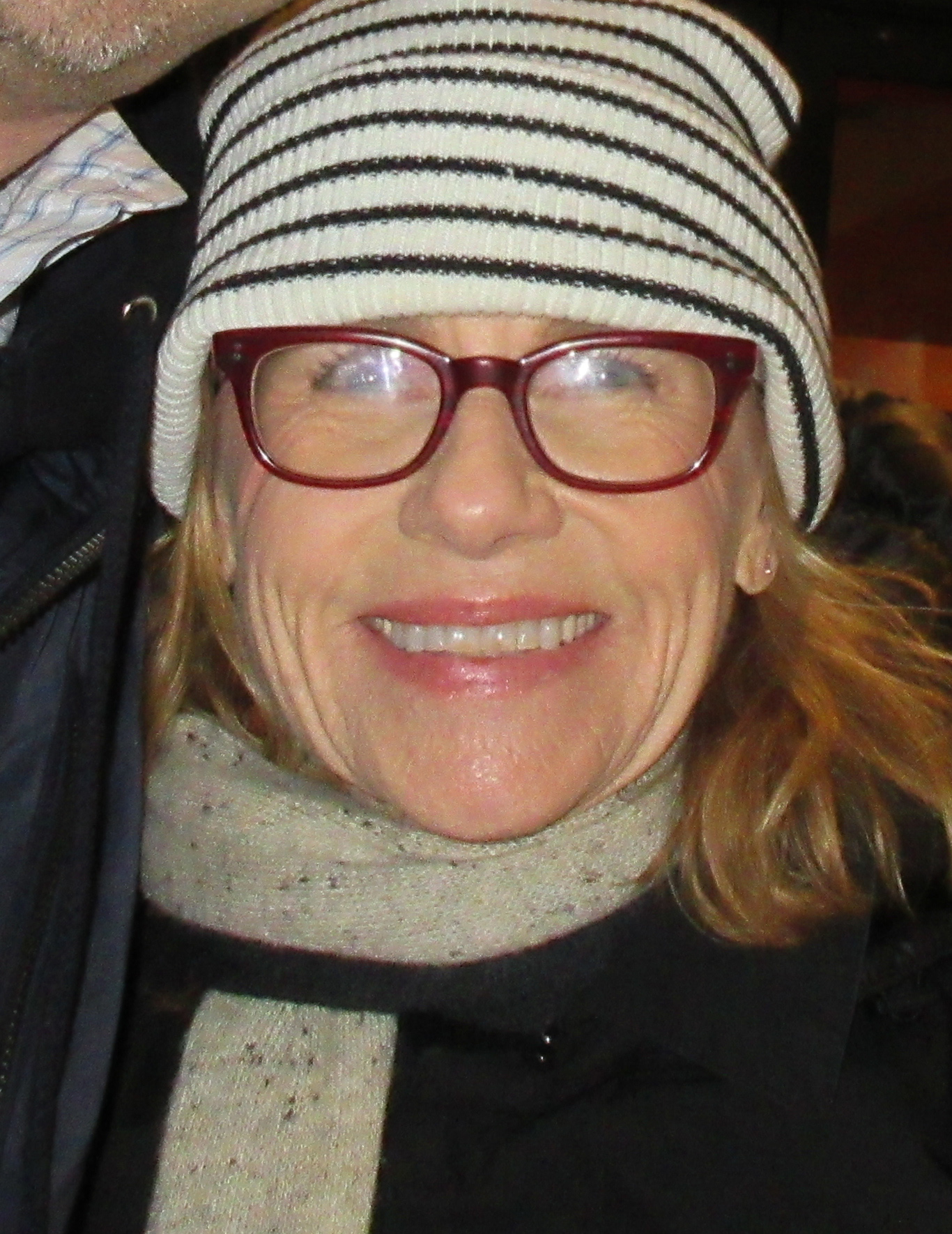
Amy Madigan, Outstanding Performance by a Female Actor in a Supporting Role winner

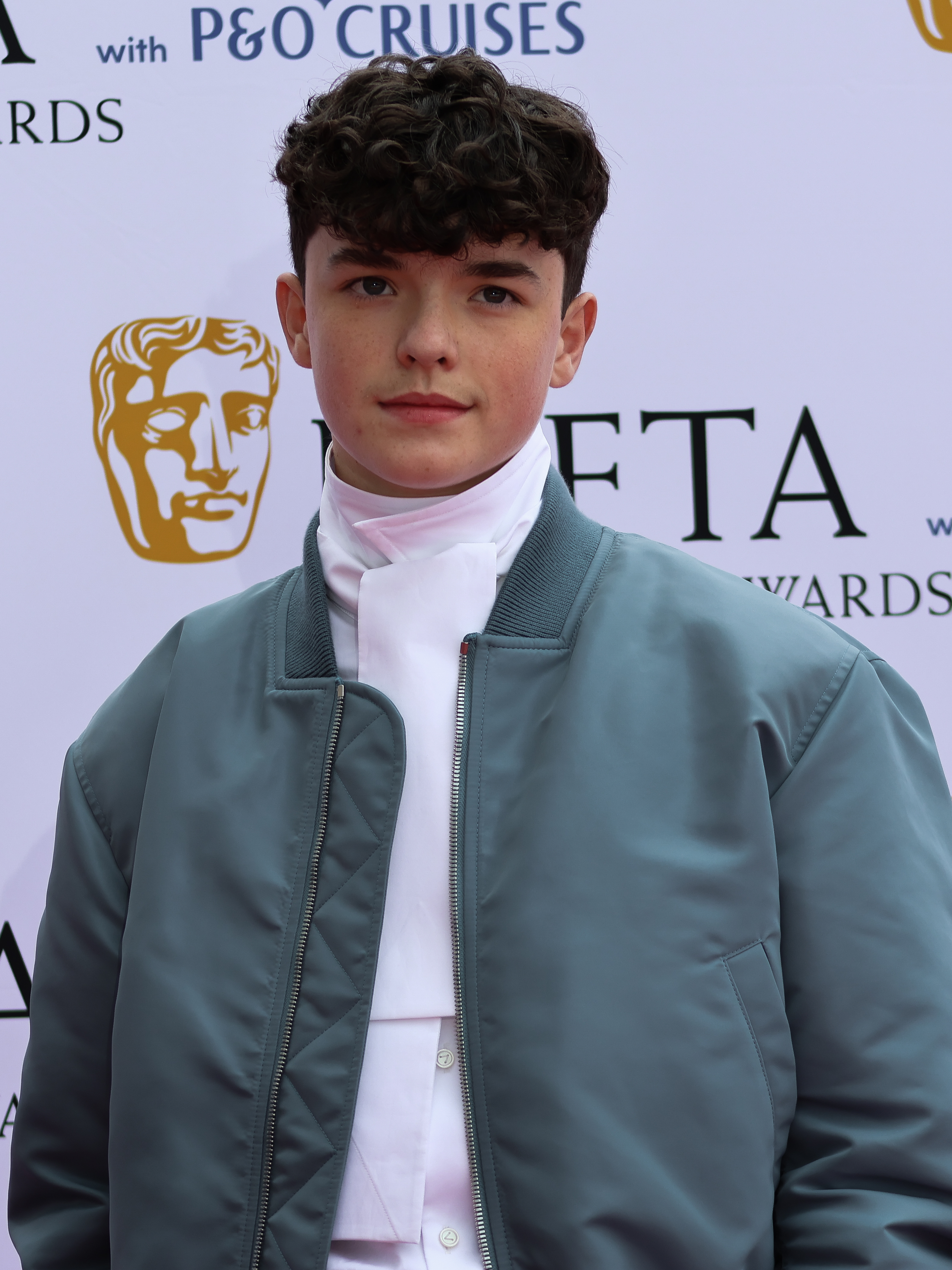
Owen Cooper, Outstanding Performance by a Male Actor in a Television Movie or Limited Series winner

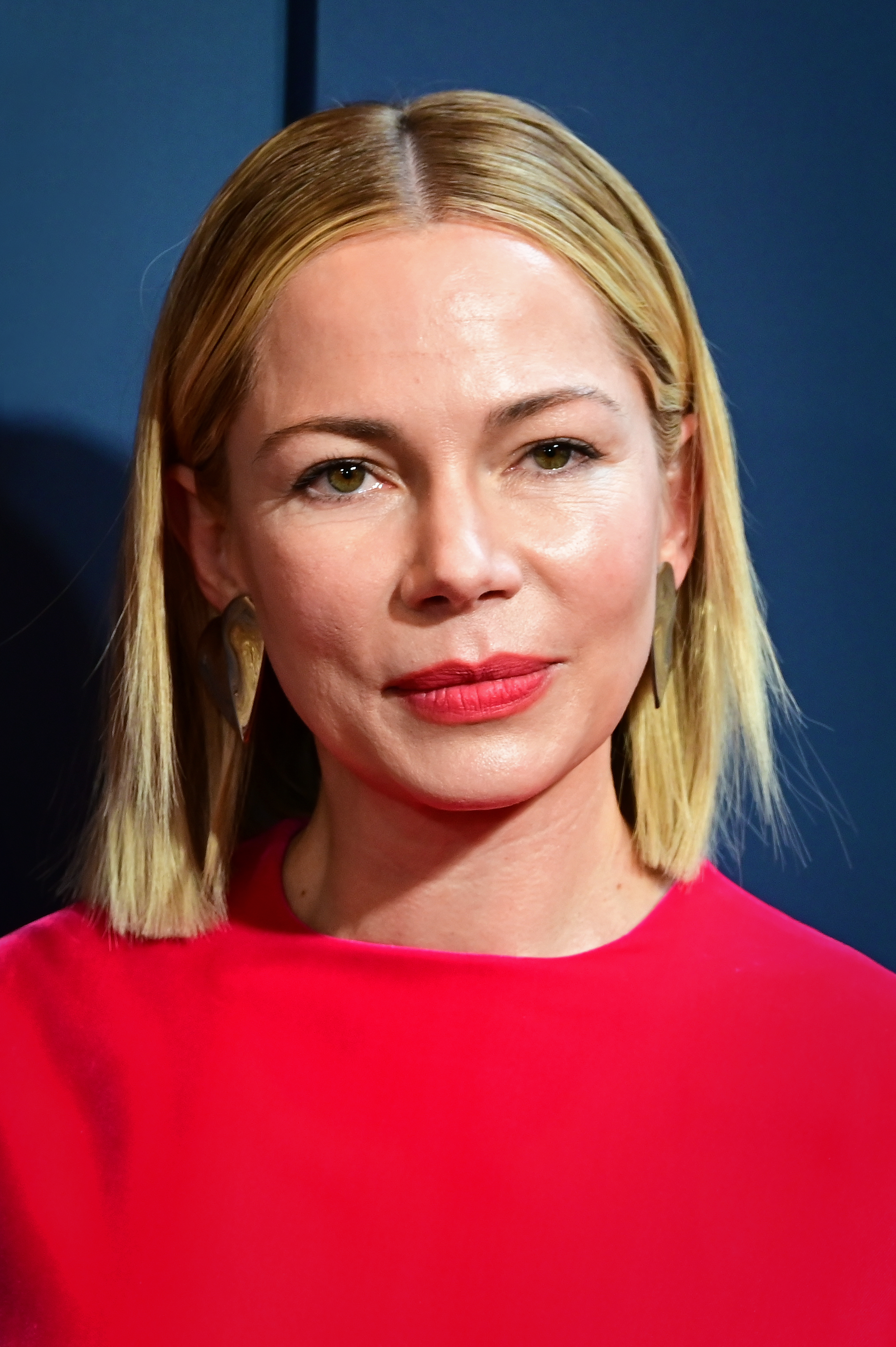
Michelle Williams, Outstanding Performance by a Female Actor in a Television Movie or Limited Series winner

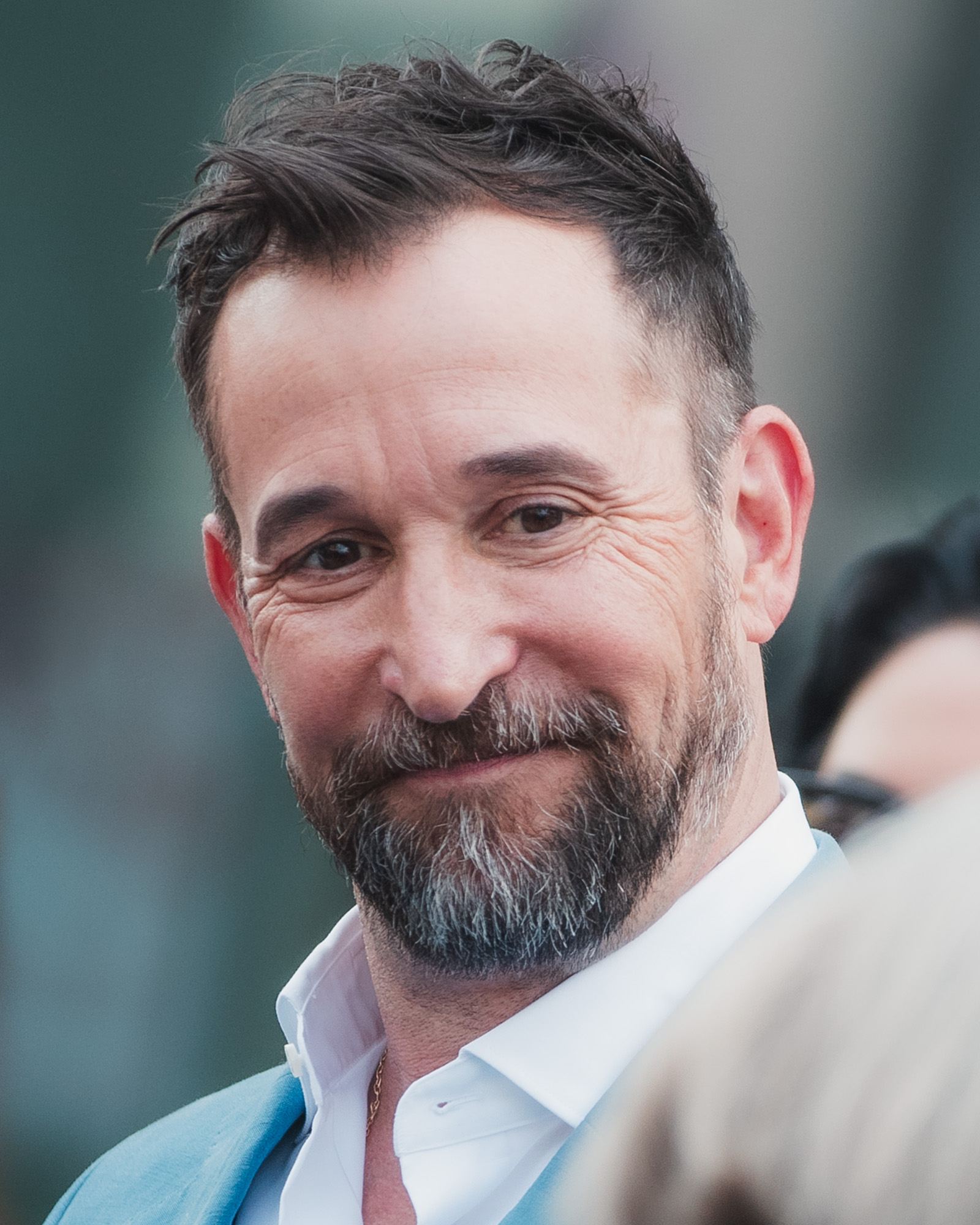
Noah Wyle, Outstanding Performance by a Male Actor in a Drama Series winner

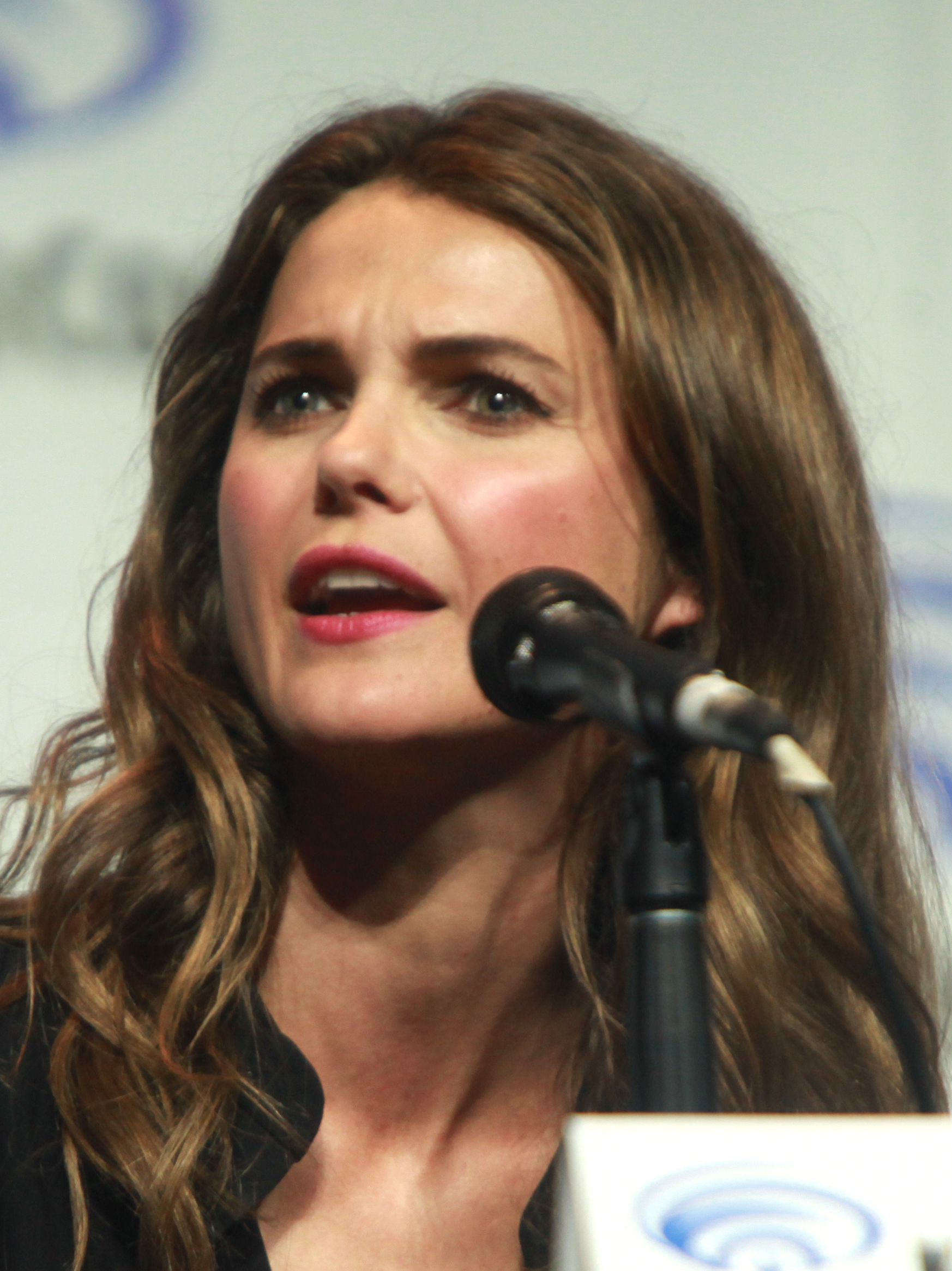
Keri Russell, Outstanding Performance by a Female Actor in a Drama Series winner

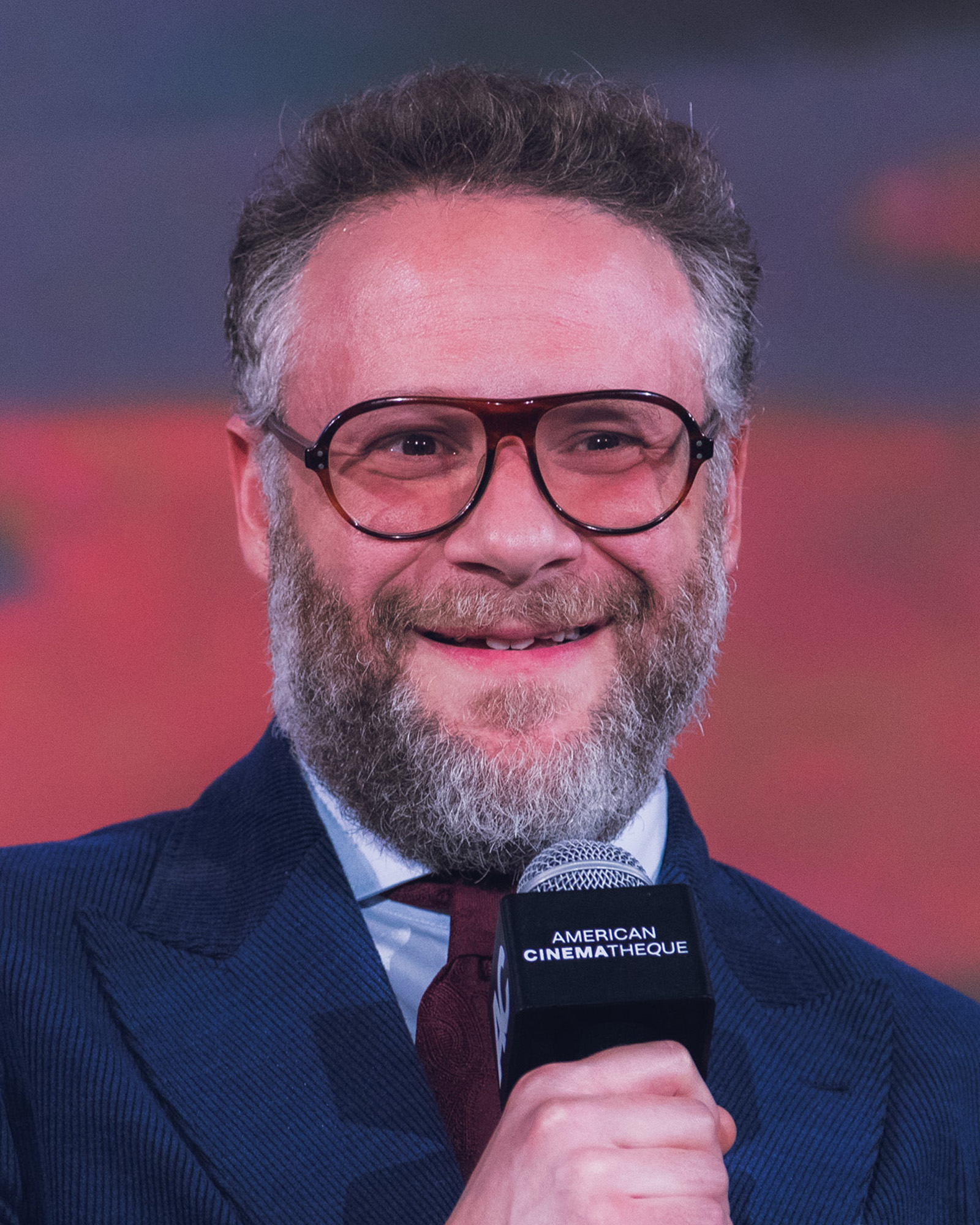
Seth Rogen, Outstanding Performance by a Male Actor in a Comedy Series winner

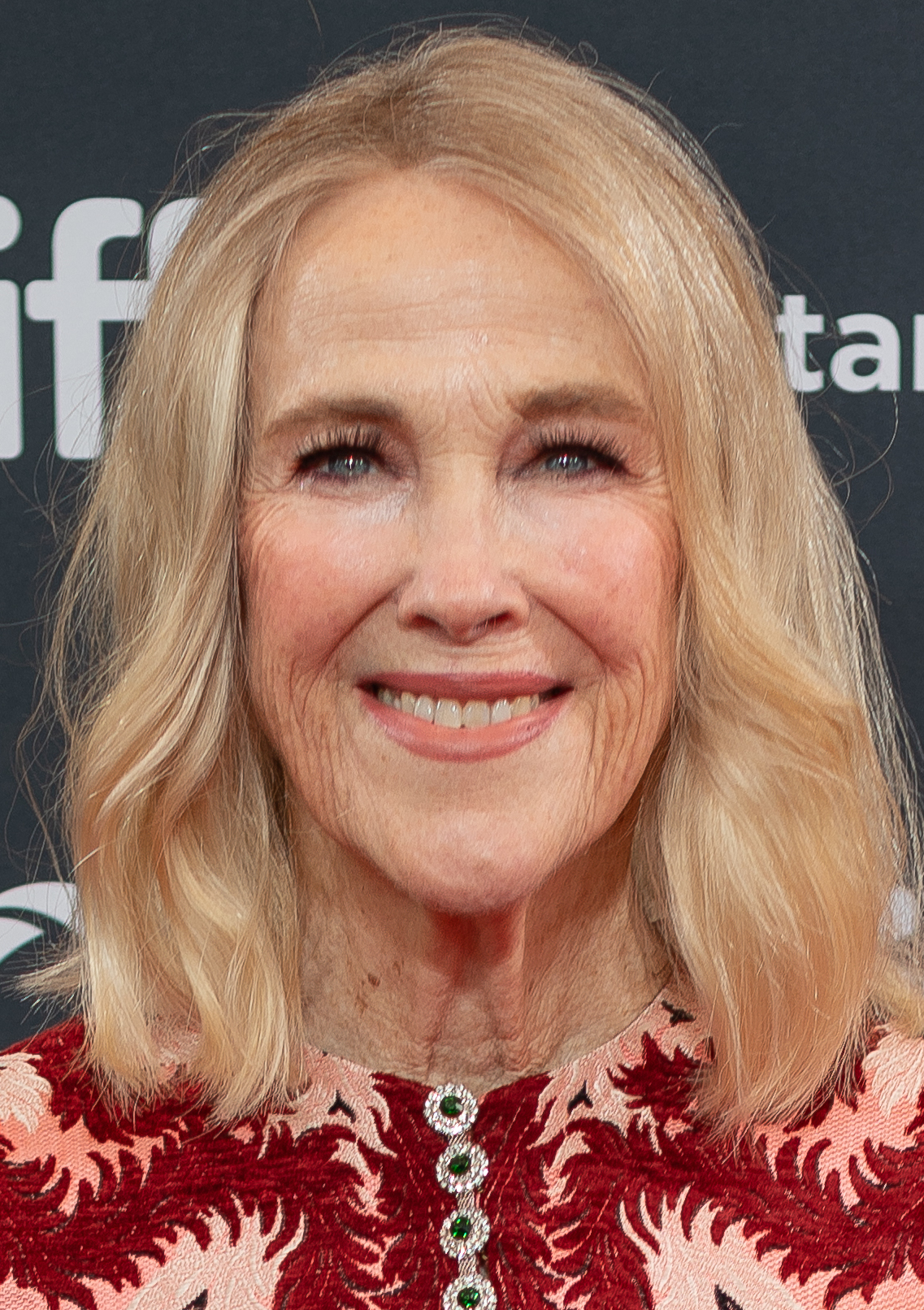
Catherine O'Hara, Outstanding Performance by a Female Actor in a Comedy Series winner

=== Film ===
Outstanding Performance by a Male Actor in a Leading Role: Michael B. Jordan – Sinners as Elijah "Smoke" Moore / Elias "Stack" Moore; Timothée Chalamet – Marty Supreme as Marty Mauser; Leonardo DiCaprio – One Battle After Another as Bob Ferguson; Ethan Hawke – Blue Moon as Lorenz Hart; Jesse Plemons – Bugonia as Teddy Gatz	Outstanding Performance by a Female Actor in a Leading Role: Jessie Buckley – Hamnet as Agnes Shakespeare; Rose Byrne – If I Had Legs I'd Kick You as Linda; Kate Hudson – Song Sung Blue as Claire Sardina; Chase Infiniti – One Battle After Another as Willa Ferguson; Emma Stone – Bugonia as Michelle Fuller
Outstanding Performance by a Male Actor in a Supporting Role: Sean Penn – One Battle After Another as Col. Steven J. Lockjaw; Miles Caton – Sinners as Samuel "Sammie" Moore; Benicio del Toro – One Battle After Another as Sensei Sergio St. Carlos; Jacob Elordi – Frankenstein as The Creature; Paul Mescal – Hamnet as William Shakespeare	Outstanding Performance by a Female Actor in a Supporting Role: Amy Madigan – Weapons as Gladys; Odessa A'zion – Marty Supreme as Rachel Mizler; Ariana Grande – Wicked: For Good as Galinda "Glinda" Upland; Wunmi Mosaku – Sinners as Annie; Teyana Taylor – One Battle After Another as Perfidia Beverly Hills
Outstanding Performance by a Cast in a Motion Picture: Sinners – Miles Caton, Buddy Guy, Michael B. Jordan, Jayme Lawson, Delroy Lindo, Omar Miller, Wunmi Mosaku, Jack O'Connell, and Hailee Steinfeld; Frankenstein – David Bradley, Christian Convery, Charles Dance, Jacob Elordi, Mia Goth, Oscar Isaac, Felix Kammerer, Lars Mikkelsen, and Christoph Waltz; Hamnet – Joe Alwyn, Jessie Buckley, Noah Jupe, Paul Mescal, and Emily Watson; Marty Supreme – Odessa A'zion, Sandra Bernhard, Timothée Chalamet, Emory Cohen, Fran Drescher, Abel Ferrara, Penn Jillette, Koto Kawaguchi, Luke Manley, Tyler Okonma, Kevin O'Leary, Gwyneth Paltrow, Géza Röhrig, and Larry Sloman; One Battle After Another – Benicio del Toro, Leonardo DiCaprio, Regina Hall, Chase Infiniti, Sean Penn, and Teyana Taylor
Outstanding Action Performance by a Stunt Ensemble in a Motion Picture: Mission: Impossible – The Final Reckoning; F1; Frankenstein; One Battle After Another; Sinners

=== Television ===
Outstanding Performance by a Male Actor in a Television Movie or Limited Series: Owen Cooper – Adolescence (Netflix) as Jamie Miller; Jason Bateman – Black Rabbit (Netflix) as Vince Friedken; Stephen Graham – Adolescence (Netflix) as Eddie Miller; Charlie Hunnam – Monster: The Ed Gein Story (Netflix) as Ed Gein; Matthew Rhys – The Beast in Me (Netflix) as Nile Jarvis	Outstanding Performance by a Female Actor in a Television Movie or Limited Series: Michelle Williams – Dying for Sex (FX) as Molly Kochan; Claire Danes – The Beast in Me (Netflix) as Agatha Wiggs; Erin Doherty – Adolescence (Netflix) as Briony Ariston; Sarah Snook – All Her Fault (Peacock) as Marissa Irvine; Christine Tremarco – Adolescence (Netflix) as Manda Miller
Outstanding Performance by a Male Actor in a Drama Series: Noah Wyle – The Pitt (HBO Max) as Dr. Michael "Robby" Robinavitch; Sterling K. Brown – Paradise (Hulu) as Xavier Collins; Billy Crudup – The Morning Show (Apple TV) as Cory Ellison; Walton Goggins – The White Lotus (HBO) as Rick Hatchett; Gary Oldman – Slow Horses (Apple TV) as Jackson Lamb	Outstanding Performance by a Female Actor in a Drama Series: Keri Russell – The Diplomat (Netflix) as Kate Wyler; Britt Lower – Severance (Apple TV) as Helena Eagan / Helly R.; Parker Posey – The White Lotus (HBO) as Victoria Ratliff; Rhea Seehorn – Pluribus (Apple TV) as Carol Sturka; Aimee Lou Wood – The White Lotus (HBO) as Chelsea
Outstanding Performance by a Male Actor in a Comedy Series: Seth Rogen – The Studio (Apple TV) as Matt Remick; Ike Barinholtz – The Studio (Apple TV) as Sal Saperstein; Adam Brody – Nobody Wants This (Netflix) as Noah Roklov; Ted Danson – A Man on the Inside (Netflix) as Charles Nieuwendyk; Martin Short – Only Murders in the Building (Hulu) as Oliver Putnam	Outstanding Performance by a Female Actor in a Comedy Series: Catherine O'Hara – The Studio (Apple TV) as Patty Leigh (posthumous); Kathryn Hahn – The Studio (Apple TV) as Maya Mason; Jenna Ortega – Wednesday (Netflix) as Wednesday Addams; Jean Smart – Hacks (HBO Max) as Deborah Vance; Kristen Wiig – Palm Royale (Apple TV) as Maxine Simmons
Outstanding Performance by an Ensemble in a Drama Series: The Pitt (HBO Max) – Amielynn Abellera, Shabana Azeez, Patrick Ball, Isa Briones, Jalen Thomas Brooks, Taylor Dearden, Fiona Dourif, Supriya Ganesh, Joanna Going, Gerran Howell, Michael Hyatt, Tracy Ifeachor, Katherine LaNasa, Krystel V. McNeil, Brandon Mendez Homer, Alexandra Metz, Tracy Vilar, Kristin Villanueva, and Noah Wyle; The Diplomat (Netflix) – Ali Ahn, Penny Downie, Rosaline Elbay, Ato Essandoh, David Gyasi, Rory Kinnear, Nana Mensah, Graham Miller, Keri Russell, and Rufus Sewell; Landman (Paramount+) – Paulina Chávez, Mark Collie, Sam Elliott, Colm Feore, Andy Garcia, James Jordan, Ali Larter, Jacob Lofland, Caleb Martin, Demi Moore, Michelle Randolph, Mustafa Speaks, Billy Bob Thornton, and Kayla Wallace; Severance (Apple TV) – Patricia Arquette, Sarah Bock, Michael Chernus, Zach Cherry, Dichen Lachman, Britt Lower, Darri Ólafsson, Adam Scott, Tramell Tillman, Jen Tullock, John Turturro, and Christopher Walken; The White Lotus (HBO) – Leslie Bibb, Carrie Coon, Nicholas Duvernay, Arnas Fedaravicius, Christian Friedel, Scott Glenn, Walton Goggins, Jon Gries, Dom Hetrakul, Sarah Catherine Hook, Jason Isaacs, Yuri Kolokolnikov, Julian Kostov, Charlotte Le Bon, Lalisa Manobal, Michelle Monaghan, Sam Nivola, Morgana O'Reilly, Lek Patravadi, Shalini Peiris, Parker Posey, Sam Rockwell, Natasha Rothwell, Patrick Schwarzenegger, Tayme Thapthimthong, and Aimee Lou Wood
Outstanding Performance by an Ensemble in a Comedy Series: The Studio (Apple TV) – Ike Barinholtz, Kathryn Hahn, Catherine O'Hara (posthumous), Seth Rogen, and Chase Sui Wonders; Abbott Elementary (ABC) – Quinta Brunson, William Stanford Davis, Janelle James, Chris Perfetti, Sheryl Lee Ralph, Lisa Ann Walter, and Tyler James Williams; The Bear (FX) – Lionel Boyce, Liza Colón-Zayas, Ayo Edebiri, Abby Elliott, Edwin Lee Gibson, Corey Hendrix, Andrew Lopez, Matty Matheson, Ebon Moss-Bachrach, Oliver Platt, Sarah Ramos, Ricky Staffieri, and Jeremy Allen White; Hacks (HBO Max) – Rose Abdoo, Dan Bucatinsky, Carl Clemons-Hopkins, Paul W. Downs, Hannah Einbinder, Mark Indelicato, Jean Smart, Megan Stalter, and Michaela Watkins; Only Murders in the Building (Hulu) – Michael Cyril Creighton, Beanie Feldstein, Jermaine Fowler, Selena Gomez, Jackie Hoffman, Steve Martin, Martin Short, and Dianne Wiest
Outstanding Action Performance by a Stunt Ensemble in a Television Series: The Last of Us (HBO); Andor (Disney+); Landman (Paramount+); Squid Game (Netflix); Stranger Things (Netflix)

=== SAG-AFTRA Life Achievement Award ===
- Harrison Ford

== In Memoriam ==
The "In Memoriam" segment, introduced by Sarah Paulson, paid tribute to actors who died in 2025 and early 2026.

- James Van Der Beek
- Jerry Adler
- Melanie Watson Bernhardt
- Gil Gerard
- Peter Kwong
- Eric Dane
- Terence Stamp
- Isiah Whitlock Jr.
- Anthony Geary
- Pat Finn
- Jean Marsh
- Elizabeth Franz
- Bobby Sherman
- James McEachin
- Dawn Didawick
- David Johansen
- Richard Chamberlain
- Michelle Trachtenberg
- Valerie Mahaffey
- Denis Arndt
- Peter Greene
- Sally Kirkland
- Lar Park Lincoln
- Ron Dean
- Cary-Hiroyuki Tagawa
- Samantha Eggar
- Udo Kier
- Wings Hauser
- Pat Crowley
- Sheila Ivy Traister
- Jay North
- Connie Francis
- Stephen Mendillo
- Tristan Rogers
- Graham Greene
- Harris Yulin
- Polly Holliday
- Nicky Katt
- Robert Carradine
- Marcia Rodd
- Peter Jason
- Priscilla Pointer
- Gailard Sartain
- Aki Aleong
- Sian Barbara Allen
- Alfie Wise
- Clive Revill
- Eileen Fulton
- Rick Hurst
- Brigitte Bardot
- Robert Trebor
- Joe Don Baker
- James Ransone
- Tom Noonan
- Claudia Cardinale
- T. K. Carter
- Pippa Scott
- Danny Seagren
- Ronnie Rondell Jr.
- Michael Madsen
- Loni Anderson
- Lynn Hamilton
- George Wendt
- Danielle Spencer
- Ruth Buzzi
- Demond Wilson
- Renée Victor
- Jonathan Joss
- Bud Cort
- Loretta Swit
- Diane Ladd
- Julian McMahon
- June Lockhart
- Rob Reiner
- Malcolm-Jamal Warner
- Robert Duvall
- Gene Hackman
- Val Kilmer
- Catherine O'Hara
- Diane Keaton
- Robert Redford

== Presenters ==
The following individuals, listed in order of appearance, presented the following categories:

Presenters
Name(s)	Role
Kristen Wiig; Teyana Taylor; Delroy Lindo; Kate Hudson; Michael J. Fox	"I Am An Actor" segment
Kathryn Hahn; Connor Storrie	Presented Outstanding Performance by a Female Actor in a Drama Series
Jenna Ortega	Presented Outstanding Performance by a Male Actor in a Comedy Series
Jacob Elordi; Mia Goth; Christoph Waltz	Presented the film Frankenstein on the Outstanding Performance by a Cast in a Motion Picture segment
Sterling K. Brown; Janelle James	Presented Outstanding Performance by a Female Actor in a Television Movie or Limited Series
Benicio del Toro; Teyana Taylor; Regina Hall; Chase Infiniti	Presented the film One Battle After Another on the Outstanding Performance by a Cast in a Motion Picture segment
Lisa Kudrow	Presented Outstanding Performance by a Female Actor in a Comedy Series
Jessie Buckley; Paul Mescal	Presented the film Hamnet on the Outstanding Performance by a Cast in a Motion Picture segment
Paul W. Downs; Megan Stalter	Presented Outstanding Performance by a Male Actor in a Drama Series
Jenna Fischer; Mindy Kaling; Ellie Kemper; Angela Kinsey	Presented Outstanding Performance by an Ensemble in a Comedy Series
Damson Idris; Yerin Ha	Presented Outstanding Performance by a Male Actor in a Television Movie or Limited Series
Michael B. Jordan; Wunmi Mosaku; Miles Caton; Delroy Lindo	Presented the film Sinners on the Outstanding Performance by a Cast in a Motion Picture segment
Claire Danes; Damian Lewis	Presented Outstanding Performance by an Ensemble in a Drama Series
Allison Janney	Presented Outstanding Performance by a Male Actor in a Supporting Role
Tyler Okonma; Timothée Chalamet; Odessa A'zion; Gwyneth Paltrow	Presented the film Marty Supreme on the Outstanding Performance by a Cast in a Motion Picture segment
Woody Harrelson	Presented the SAG-AFTRA Life Achievement Award for Harrison Ford
Sean Astin	SAG-AFTRA President's remarks
Orlando Bloom	Presented Outstanding Performance by a Female Actor in a Supporting Role
Sarah Paulson	Presented the In Memoriam tribute
Andy Garcia	Presented Outstanding Performance by a Female Actor in a Leading Role
Viola Davis	Presented Outstanding Performance by a Male Actor in a Leading Role
Samuel L. Jackson	Presented Outstanding Performance by a Cast in a Motion Picture

== Multiple nominations ==
=== Film ===
Nominations	Film
7	One Battle After Another
5	Sinners
3	Frankenstein
3	Hamnet
3	Marty Supreme
2	Bugonia

=== Television ===
Nominations	Series
5	The Studio
4	Adolescence
4	The White Lotus
2	The Beast in Me
2	The Diplomat
2	Hacks
2	Landman
2	Only Murders in the Building
2	The Pitt
2	Severance

== Multiple wins ==
=== Film ===
Wins	Film
2	Sinners

=== Television ===
Wins	Series
3	The Studio
2	The Pitt
