= Undergods =

- Directed by: Chino Moya
- Written by: Chino Moya
- Produced by: Sophie Venner
- Starring: Géza Röhrig; Johann Myers; Michael Gould; Hayley Carmichael; Ned Dennehy; Khalid Abdalla; Eric Godon; Jan Bijvoet; Lorraine Hilton; Tanya Reynolds; Tadhg Murphy; Sam Louwyck; Katariina Unt; Adrian Rawlins; Kate Dickie; Burn Gorman
- Cinematography: David Raedeker
- Edited by: Walter Fasano; Tommaso Gallone; Maya Maffioli
- Music by: Wojciech Golczewski
- Release date: August 30, 2020 (Fantasia)
- Running time: 92 minutes
- Countries: United Kingdom; Belgium; Estonia; Serbia; Sweden
- Language: English

Undergods is a 2020 science fiction thriller drama film written and directed by Chino Moya and starring Géza Röhrig, Johann Myers, Michael Gould, Hayley Carmichael, Ned Dennehy, Khalid Abdalla, Eric Godon, Jan Bijvoet, Lorraine Hilton, Tanya Reynolds, Tadhg Murphy, Sam Louwyck, Katariina Unt, Adrian Rawlins, Kate Dickie and Burn Gorman.

== Plot ==
The movie starts with a pair of vagrants, Z & K, scavenging for corpses in a post-apocalyptic suburb. Whilst driving their van, they begin discussing disturbing dreams they've had, and Z begins describing a recurring one about "a room with a ghost inside". Which leads into the first nested narrative.

Here, middle aged couple Ron (the "ghost") & Ruth are the sole residents of a new apartment building in the modern day. They are visited one night by Harry, who claims to live elsewhere in the building but has locked himself out. Ron lets him in and acts as a good host, only to be plagued by nightmares of Ruth rejecting him and paranoid thoughts that she's cheating on him with Harry. Harry & Ruth indeed sleep together after an outburst from Ron reaches fever pitch, and Ron learns from the building's owner that there is nobody else living in the building. Ron thus confronts Harry at knifepoint, and forces him to leave their home. But not before Harry insults Ruth's sexual performance. Emboldening Ron to follow him into the lift. As the building owner gives a tour of the building to new tenants - Octavius & his young daughter Horatia - the lift doors open in front of them to reveal a dead Ron.

Later, in their new apartment, Octavius tells Horatia a bedtime story: Hans is a divorced merchant who is meeting with an eccentric "Foreigner" regarding their lucrative invention, and decides to swindle them out of it. That evening, he is visited by his adult daughter Maria & her new boyfriend Johann, who rubs them both the wrong way with his egocentrism. Once the Foreigner realizes that Hans has stolen his ideas to profit from without him, he kidnaps Maria & taunts Hans by leaving her copy of E. T. A. Hoffmann's "The Sandman" with his office secretary. By which point, we return to the previous narrative to see that Horatia has fallen asleep and Octavius has stopped telling the story.

Hans recruits Johann to help save Maria by accompanying him to the Foreigner's designated meeting spot. Their rescue attempt is quickly derailed, and upon leaving the building they find themselves in the dilapidated landscape from the start of the film. They are found by Z & K, who proceed to kill Hans to sell his body "for meat" and chain Johann to sell off to a factory of indeterminate purpose, which imprisons multiple other abductees under oppressive miserable conditions. Johann performs thankless menial tasks for an unknown amount of time before eventually dying in squalor. Meanwhile, another prisoner - designated #398 - is shown winning a random-draw "anniversary lottery" held by the guards, and is told he is allowed to leave.

Returning to a modern-day setting, the final narrative introduces senior engineer Dominic impressing in a meeting with his boss, Tim. Dom & his wife Rachel are invited to Tim's upcoming birthday celebration, and he returns home to her & his teenaged step-son Will. That evening, they're shocked by the presence of a still, silent, home invader sitting in the kitchen; it's #398, whom Rachel recognizes as her previous husband & Will's father Sam, having disappeared 15 years ago. Rachel's insistence on curing him of his now-catatonic state quickly causes friction between her & an increasingly-distressed Dom, culminating with Dom attending Tim's party alone, drunkenly making a fool of himself, and being kicked out. He returns home, interrupts Rachel's latest therapeutic session with Sam, and begin a vicious argument regarding ownership of the house. This ends when Sam slowly stands, and speaks for the first time in the film by solemnly admonishing them for "talking too much".

Sam then promptly bludgeons Rachel to death. Followed by Dom. During which, we revert back to Z & K in the van from the beginning of the film, revealing that this is still all them discussing their dreams. K asks what happened to Sam's son, Will. When Z describes Will returning home, none-the-wiser, and peacefully watching flocking birds on the television with Sam unaccosted, K expresses confusion. Which Z responds to with a series of hypotheticals. Both ultimately conclude that things might've been happier for everyone had events happened differently, and make a toast "to families".

== Cast ==
- Géza Röhrig as Z
- Johann Myers as K
- Michael Gould as Ron
- Hayley Carmichael as Ruth
- Ned Dennehy as Harry
- Simon Manyonda as Reed The Estate Agent
- Khalid Abdalla as Octavius the Storyteller
- Maddison Whelan as Horatia The Young Daughter
- Eric Godon as Hans
- Jan Bijvoet as Foreigner
- Tanya Reynolds as Maria
- Tadhg Murphy as Johann
- Lorraine Hilton as Greta the Secretary
- Slavko Labović as Factory Appraiser
- Katariina Unt as Female Supervisor
- Douglas Russell as Uros The Guard
- Sam Louwyck as Sam
- Kate Dickie as Rachel
- Adrian Rawlins as Dominic
- Burn Gorman as Tim
- Jonathan Case as Will
- Tim Plester as Ezequiel The Therapist

== Release ==
The film premiered at the Fantasia International Film Festival in Canada on August 30, 2020. Then it was released in the United States in theaters, on cable and digital VOD on May 7, 2021.

== Reception ==
The film has an 84% approval rating on the review aggregator website Rotten Tomatoes, based on 37 reviews. The website's consensus reads: "Undergods trips over its own storytelling at times, but this stylish sci-fi outing has a unique voice and a message worth contemplating."

Phil Hoad of The Guardian awarded the film four stars out of five. Hanna B. of Film Threat scored the film an 8 out of 10. Peter Debruge of Variety gave the film a positive review and wrote, "Coming at the same themes from different angles, the three lessons serve to upend the comfort and perceived control that fathers, husbands and First World patriarchs have traditionally enjoyed."
