= Koto Kawaguchi =

Japanese actor and table tennis player (born 1999)

- Born: September 7, 1999 (age 26)
- Occupations: Table tennis player; actor
- Known for: Marty Supreme

Koto Kawaguchi (川口 功人, Kawaguchi Kōto; born 1999) is a Japanese deaf table tennis player and actor. He competes in deaf table tennis for Toyota Motor Corporation and won a bronze medal in the men's team event at the 2022 Summer Deaflympics. He made his acting debut as Koto Endo in Josh Safdie's film Marty Supreme (2025).

== Table tennis career ==
Kawaguchi has been playing table tennis professionally since 2019 and is affiliated with Toyota Motor Corporation. He has won multiple titles in Japanese national deaf table tennis competitions, including first place in singles at the 53rd National Sports Competition for the Deaf in 2019. At the 2022 Summer Deaflympics in Caxias do Sul, Brazil, he won a bronze medal in the men's team event.

== Acting career ==
In 2025, Kawaguchi was cast in Josh Safdie's Marty Supreme as Koto Endo, a Japanese table tennis champion who serves as the main rival to Timothée Chalamet's protagonist Marty Mauser. The character, who is depicted as deaf in the film, was partially inspired by Kawaguchi himself and partially by Hiroji Satoh, a Japanese champion who competed against Marty Reisman in the 1950s.

Toyota produced an audition video of Kawaguchi playing table tennis and shared it with the film's production through a translator. Kawaguchi had no prior acting experience and has said he initially thought the casting offer was a scam. The film features live table tennis play in its match sequences, with Kawaguchi performing opposite Chalamet.

== Awards and nominations ==
Award	Year	Category	Nominated work	Result	Ref.
Actor Awards	2026	Outstanding Performance by a Cast in a Motion Picture	Marty Supreme	Nominated	
