= Luke Manley =

American actor (born 1992/93)

- Born: 1992 or 1993 (age 33–34); New York, U.S.
- Education: Washingtonville High School; State University of New York at Oswego

Instagram information
- Page: Luke Manley
- Followers: 64.2 thousand

X information
- Handle: @FatrickEwing
- Display name: Luke Manley
- Followers: 16.4 thousand

Luke Joseph Manley is an American internet personality and actor. He made his feature film debut as Dion Galanis in Josh Safdie's Marty Supreme (2025).

== Career ==
Manley, who posts online as "lukeylunchb0x" and "FatrickEwing", first rose to internet notoriety through a June 3, 2021 Sidetalk video about Trae Young and the New York Knicks during the 2021 NBA playoffs. The same month, he gained further attention via posts on Humans of New York and by New York Nico. He was later featured in content created by Barstool Sports. He made it to the finals and finished in third place in the third season of Barstool Idol.

Director Josh Safdie and casting director Jennifer Venditti discovered Manley through his Sidetalk and New York Nico appearances. Safdie developed the role of Dion Galanis for him while writing Marty Supreme.

Venditti's casting process included a lengthy on-camera personal interview and improvisational scenes. Manley, who had no prior film acting experience, landed the role of Dion Galanis, a friend of protagonist Marty Mauser (Timothée Chalamet). For a scene requiring him to act angry—an emotion Manley said did not come naturally to him—he asked Chalamet to berate him off-camera to provoke the reaction.

Marty Supreme had its world premiere as the secret screening at the New York Film Festival in October 2025, with Manley attending the premiere. The film opened theatrically in the United States on December 25, 2025.

In August 2026, it was announced that Manley would be appearing in the fifth and final season of the BBC Two and HBO drama Industry.

== Personal life ==
Manley graduated from Washingtonville High School in Washingtonville, New York in 2010 and from the State University of New York at Oswego's School of Communication, Media and the Arts in 2015. He lives in the Hudson Valley and works as a dispatcher for a cable company.

== Filmography ==
Year	Title	Role	Notes
2025	No Need to Worry	Vinny	Short film
2025	Marty Supreme	Dion Galanis	

== Awards and nominations ==
Award	Year	Category	Nominated work	Result	Ref.
Actor Awards	2026	Outstanding Performance by a Cast in a Motion Picture	Marty Supreme	Nominated	
