= Géza Röhrig =

Hungarian actor (born 1967)

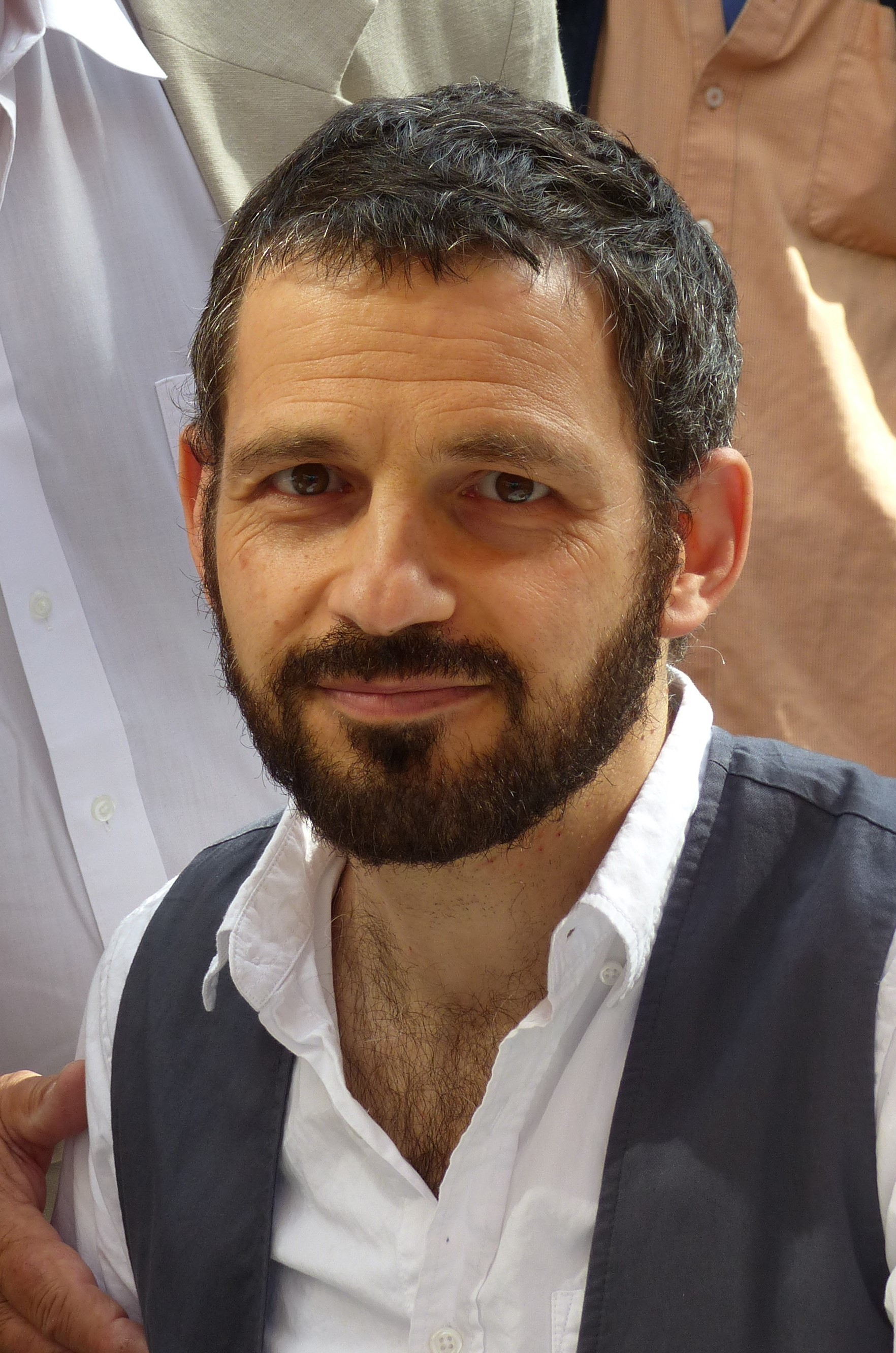
- Röhrig in 2016
- Born: 11 May 1967 (age 59); Budapest, Hungarian People's Republic
- Education: Academy of Drama and Film in Budapest
- Occupations: Actor; poet

Géza Röhrig (Hungarian: Röhrig Géza, pronounced [ˈrøːriɡ ˈɡeːzɒ]; born 11 May 1967) is a Hungarian actor and poet. He is best known for his role in the 2015 film Son of Saul, which won the Grand Prix at the 2015 Cannes Film Festival, the Golden Globe for Best Foreign Language Film and the Academy Award for Best Foreign Language Film.

== Life and career ==
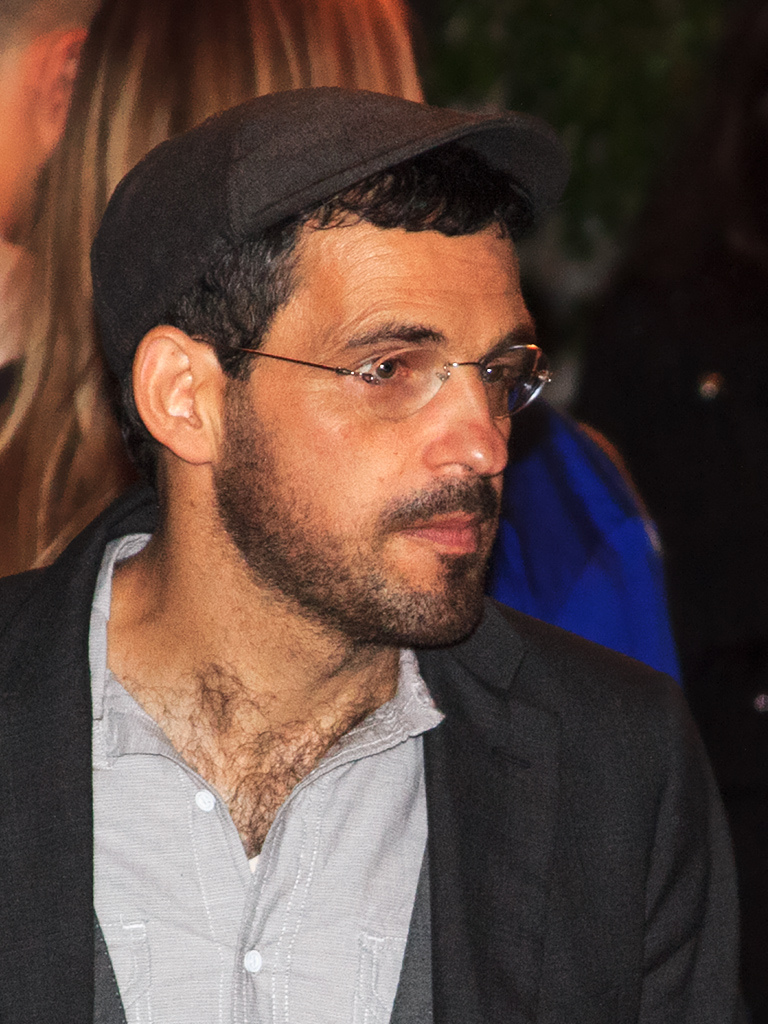
Röhrig in 2015

Géza Röhrig was born in Budapest, Hungary. His mother left the family after he was born, and his father died when he was four, and Röhrig spent his childhood in foster care. From the age of 12 he was raised by a Jewish family. In the 1980s, he was the frontman of an underground music band called Huckleberry (also known as HuckRebelly), whose concerts were often interrupted by the communist authorities. At university he studied Hungarian and Polish, and after a visit to Auschwitz during a study tour in Poland, he decided to become an Orthodox Jew in Brooklyn, United States. He portrayed poet Attila József in a film by József Madaras. He studied filmmaking under István Szabó.

He published two collections of poems on the theme of the Shoah, Hamvasztókönyv ("Book of Incineration", 1995) and Fogság ("Captivity", 1997). He graduated from the Academy of Drama and Film in Budapest with a degree in filmmaking. Since 2000, he has lived in The Bronx borough of New York City, where he received a degree from the Jewish Theological Seminary of America and has been a kindergarten teacher at Hannah Senesh Community Day School in Brooklyn. He is married, and has four children. He has published many collections of poetry.

== Work ==
=== Prose ===
- A Rebbe tollatépett papagája: képzelt haszid történetek (in Hungarian). Budapest: Múlt és Jövő. 1999. ISBN 963-9171-22-0.

=== Poetry ===
- Hamvasztókönyv (in Hungarian). Budapest: Múlt és Jövö. 1995. ISBN 963-85295-2-0.
- Fogság (in Hungarian). Budapest: Széphalom Könyvműhely. 1997. ISBN 963-9028-10-X.
- Éj (in Hungarian). Budapest: Széphalom Könyvműhely. 1999. ISBN 963-9028-56-8.
- Sziget (in Hungarian). Budapest: Széphalom Könyvműhely. 2000. ISBN 963-9028-75-4.
- Törvény : [versek] (in Hungarian). Budapest: Múlt és Jövő. 2006. ISBN 963-9512-20-6.
- Honvágy (in Hungarian). Budapest: Múlt és Jövő. 2010. ISBN 978-963-9512-57-3.
- az ember aki a cipőjében hordta a gyökereit (in Hungarian). Budapest: Magvető. 2016. ISBN 978-963-14-3372-2.
- angyalvakond (in Hungarian). Budapest: Menhely Alapítvány. 2018. ISBN 9786158099912.

== Filmography ==
=== Film ===
Year	Title	Role	Notes
2015	Son of Saul	Saul	
2018	To Dust	Shmuel	
2018	The Chaperone	Joseph	
2019	Muse	Luca	
2019	Bad Art	Gene	
2020	Resistance	Georges Loinger	
2020	Undergods	Z	
2023	Five and a Half Love Stories in a Vilnius Apartment	Philip	
2025	Desert Warrior	Al Hamerz	
2025	Marty Supreme	Bela Kletzki	
TBA	The Way of the Wind	Jesus Christ	Post-production
TBA	Yeti		Filming

=== Television ===
- 1989: Közjáték, episode Mrożek: Levélkék (director)
- 1989: Eszmélet by József Madaras, episodes 1 and 2: Attila József
- 1990: Armelle by Jacek Lenczowski: Piotr

== Awards and nominations ==
Award	Year	Category	Nominated work	Result	Ref.
Actor Awards	2026	Outstanding Performance by a Cast in a Motion Picture	Marty Supreme	Nominated	
