= Marty Supreme =

2025 film by Josh Safdie

- Theatrical release poster
- Directed by: Josh Safdie
- Written by: Ronald Bronstein; Josh Safdie
- Produced by: Josh Safdie; Ronald Bronstein; Eli Bush; Anthony Katagas; Timothée Chalamet
- Starring: Timothée Chalamet; Gwyneth Paltrow; Odessa A'zion; Kevin O'Leary; Tyler Okonma; Abel Ferrara; Fran Drescher
- Cinematography: Darius Khondji
- Edited by: Ronald Bronstein; Josh Safdie
- Music by: Daniel Lopatin
- Production company: Central Pictures
- Distributed by: A24
- Release dates: October 6, 2025 (NYFF); December 25, 2025 (United States)
- Running time: 150 minutes
- Country: United States
- Language: English
- Budget: $60–70 million
- Box office: $192.4 million

Marty Supreme is a 2025 American sports comedy-drama film directed by Josh Safdie, who co-wrote it with Ronald Bronstein. Set in the 1950s, it stars Timothée Chalamet as table tennis player Marty Mauser (loosely based on Marty Reisman) and follows his quest to become world champion. Gwyneth Paltrow, Odessa A'zion, Kevin O'Leary, Tyler Okonma, Abel Ferrara and Fran Drescher appear in supporting roles.

Safdie and Bronstein began developing the film in 2018 after Safdie was given a copy of Reisman's 1974 memoir, The Money Player: The Confessions of America's Greatest Table Tennis Champion and Hustler. Safdie met with Chalamet in 2018 and offered him the lead role. Following a multi-year development period, the project was officially announced in July 2024. It marks Safdie's first solo directorial effort since The Pleasure of Being Robbed (2008), having directed together with his brother Benny their following five films. Cinematographer Darius Khondji shot on 35 mm film stock and Safdie's regular collaborator Daniel Lopatin composed the score. Production design was led by Jack Fisk.

Marty Supreme premiered at the New York Film Festival on October 6, 2025, and was released in the United States on December 25 by A24. It received critical acclaim and was a box-office success, grossing $192 million worldwide and becoming one of A24's highest-grossing films, as well as the year’s highest grossing independent film. The National Board of Review and the American Film Institute each named it one of their top ten films of 2025. It received nine nominations at the 98th Academy Awards (among them Best Picture) and eleven at the 79th British Academy Film Awards, but did not win at either ceremony. Chalamet won Best Actor at the Golden Globes and Critics' Choice for his performance.

== Plot ==
In New York City in 1952, Marty Mauser works as a shoe salesman at his uncle Murray's shop while also competing professionally as a table tennis player. Marty dreams of winning the British Open to bring American attention to the sport. He also pitches selling orange "Marty Supreme" novelty table tennis balls to his friend Dion and Dion's businessman father, and is having an affair with his married childhood friend Rachel Mizler. When Murray refuses to give Marty the $700 he had promised Marty for his London trip, he robs the money from the shop's vault.

In London, Marty is unhappy with the players' barracks inn and stays instead at the Ritz Hotel, where he seduces former actress Kay Stone and meets her wealthy husband and pen tycoon, Milton Rockwell. Marty defeats defending champion Bela Kletzki in the semi-finals but loses the final to Koto Endo, a deaf Japanese player. Marty then tours internationally with Kletzki, performing as a halftime novelty act for the Harlem Globetrotters. Rockwell sees the business value for table tennis and offers Marty an exhibition match against Endo in Tokyo before the World Championship, but Marty angrily refuses upon learning he would be expected to throw the match to appease Japanese audiences.

Back in New York, Marty is arrested for stealing from Murray but escapes and reconnects with Rachel, learning she is pregnant, though he refuses to believe that it is his child. While staying in a run-down hotel with his friend Wally, Marty discovers he has been banned from the World Championships unless he pays a $1,500 fine for fraudulently expensing his Ritz stay. Marty's bathtub collapses through the floor, injuring mobster Ezra Mishkin, who pays Marty to take his dog Moses to a veterinarian. Marty instead hustles patrons at a bowling alley with Wally to raise the money. The bowlers later attack them at a gas station but they escape, damaging Wally's taxi and setting the station on fire. Moses runs away during the scuffle.

Rockwell returns to New York, having financed a play to relaunch Kay's career. After having sex with Kay, Marty attempts to pawn a necklace he stole from her, only to learn it is costume jewelry. Rachel comes to Marty with a black eye alleging her husband was responsible, prompting Marty to assault him. Marty and Rachel stay with Dion, who reveals he had produced the novelty balls but Marty failed to follow up. Marty and Rachel steal Dion's car and attempt to find Moses to extort Mishkin, but flee after being shot at by a farmer who has taken Moses in. Dion throws them out for stealing and damaging his car and discards the balls. Marty learns Rachel faked her black eye to manipulate him and leaves her. Rachel returns to her home, but when she confesses to her husband the baby isn't his, he throws her out.

At the opening of Kay's play, Marty apologizes for stealing her jewelry. Though she sees through him, Kay gives him a valuable necklace to pay his fine and travel. After being caught having sex in Central Park, they bribe the police with the necklace. Kay agrees to give Marty another necklace and reenters the party to retrieve it, but breaks down after receiving a bad review of the play. With Kay indisposed, Marty begs Rockwell to revive the Tokyo exhibition offer. Rockwell agrees after making Marty submit to a humiliating public spanking.

Before Marty leaves, he and Rachel are kidnapped by Mishkin after Rachel attempts to con him. Mishkin forces them to take him to the farmhouse where Moses was found. A shootout ensues in which the farmer kills one of Mishkin's henchmen, and leaves Mishkin and the other bleeding to death. The farmer is also killed in the process, and Rachel is gravely wounded. Before leaving, Marty robs Mishkin and discovers his reward money is mostly clippings from pornography magazines. He takes Rachel to the hospital as she goes into premature labor, and then leaves for Tokyo.

In Japan, Marty learns he is too late to enter the World Championship even if he pays his fine. He loses the exhibition match to Endo as planned, but when Rockwell plans to further humiliate him by making him kiss a pig on-stage, Marty announces that the contest was a sham. He successfully demands a real rematch, which he narrowly wins. Refused passage by Rockwell, Marty instead flies home with U.S. Army soldiers. After reuniting with his mother at the hospital, Marty sees Rachel asleep and embraces her with a kiss followed by breaking down in tears upon meeting his newborn child.

== Cast ==
- Timothée Chalamet as Marty Mauser, an aspiring table tennis champion, fiercely determined to be the best in the sport. The character is loosely based on real-life table tennis player Marty Reisman.
- Gwyneth Paltrow as Kay Stone, a wealthy retired actress and socialite who has a sexual relationship with Marty
- Odessa A'zion as Rachel Mizler, a married childhood friend of Marty who is having an affair with him. The character is loosely based on Geri Falk, Reisman’s first wife.
- Kevin O'Leary as Milton Rockwell, an influential businessman and Kay's husband who takes interest in Marty and table tennis
- Tyler Okonma as Wally, a taxi driver and Marty's friend, also skilled at table tennis
- Abel Ferrara as Ezra Mishkin, a criminal with whom Marty crosses paths
- Fran Drescher as Rebecca Mauser, Marty's mother
- Luke Manley as Dion Galanis, Marty's friend, who lives with his parents
- Emory Cohen as Ira Mizler, Rachel's husband
- Larry "Ratso" Sloman as Murray Norkin, Marty's uncle and shoe shop owner
- Ralph Colucci as Lloyd, Marty's coworker at the shoe shop
- Géza Röhrig as Bela Kletzki, a Holocaust survivor and table tennis champion representing Hungary. The character is loosely based on the table tennis player Alojzy Ehrlich.
- Koto Kawaguchi as Koto Endo, a deaf table tennis champion representing Japan. The character is partially inspired by Kawaguchi and partially by the table tennis player Hiroji Satoh.
- Pico Iyer as Ram Sethi, the head of the International Table Tennis Association
- John Catsimatidis as Christopher Galanis, a businessman and Dion's father
- Sandra Bernhard as Judy, Marty's neighbor, who lives downstairs
- George Gervin as Lawrence, a table tennis club owner
- Ted Williams as Ted, a worker at Lawrence's table tennis club
- Timo Boll as Vladimir Sebek, a table tennis player
- Penn Jillette as Hoff, a territorial farmer in New Jersey
- Isaac Mizrahi as Merle, a publicist working with Kay
- David Mamet as Glenn Nordmann, a stage director working with Kay
- Fred Hechinger as Troy, a stage actor working with Kay
- Spenser Granese as Clark, a man hustled by Marty and Wally
- Levon Hawke as Christian, a man hustled by Marty and Wally
- Isaac Simon as Roger, a man hustled by Marty and Wally
- Hailey Gates as Trish, Roger's girlfriend
- Mitchell Wenig as Mitch, Ezra's henchman
- Mariann Tepedino as Mariann, a shoe store customer
- Philippe Petit as a Brussels MC
- Tracy McGrady as a Globetrotter
- Kemba Walker as a Globetrotter
- Naomi Fry as an assistant to Kay Stone
- Ronald Bronstein as the voice of Blarney Stone Phone
- Ray Tintori as a Wembley cameraman
- Paul Grimstad as a theater production manager
- Robert Pattinson as the voice of the British umpire at the tournament (uncredited)
- Mahadeo Shivraj as himself, Wembley Round 3 umpire

== Production ==
=== Background and development ===
Josh Safdie's interest in table tennis began in his youth, as his grandparents often had "eccentric Jewish immigrant Lower East Side characters" playing the sport at their house. In 2018, Safdie's wife and executive producer on the film, Sara Rossein, bought a copy of table tennis player Marty Reisman's 1974 autobiography The Money Player, thinking Safdie would enjoy it. Safdie was in conversations with Timothée Chalamet at the time, as they had recently become friends, and presented him the project by focusing on Reisman's physical similarities to the actor. Chalamet accepted the role and began taking table tennis lessons that same year. Chalamet named Robert Rossen's The Hustler (1961) and Martin Scorsese's The Color of Money (1986) as references for the film.

In December 2023, Chalamet said his next film would involve table tennis. By July 2024, the project was confirmed as Marty Supreme, to be directed by Safdie, his first solo project without his brother Benny since The Pleasure of Being Robbed (2008). Safdie and Ronald Bronstein wrote the script based on Reisman's life, though "sources close to the production" called the story "a fictionalized original, rather than a biopic". They wrote backstories for every person that appeared on the film. The film was produced by Central Pictures and IPR.VC in addition to A24.

=== Casting ===
Safdie wrote the roles played by Chalamet, Gwyneth Paltrow, Tyler Okonma, and Abel Ferrara with them in mind. However, it was speculated that Julia Roberts had been offered Paltrow's part first, but turned it down. Kevin O'Leary was pursued by Safdie and Bronstein due to his persona in the ABC reality television series Shark Tank (2009–present); they flew out to O'Leary's home to watch him read for the role. Khondji said the film featured around 140 non-actors, including French highwire artist Philippe Petit. Casting director Jennifer Venditti had previously scouted Isaac Simon and Odessa A'zion; Luke Manley was discovered by the team on social media; Isaac Mizrahi was suggested by Safdie, who knew him. Venditti scouted Ralph Colucci at a horse track, as indicated by the backstory Safdie had written for his character. Yale professor Paul Grimstad appeared at the behest of Bronstein, as they were roommates in the late 1990s; Grimstad had previously appeared in Bronstein's film Frownland (2007). Mitchell Wenig was cast as a henchman; he is a friend of Safdie's who previously appeared in Safdie's Uncut Gems (2019) and Adam Sandler: Love You (2024).

The former basketball player Joe Johnson was flown to New York to appear in the film, but did not arrive on set. Professional ping-pong player Wally Green was cast in a small speaking role, but his scene was cut. Venditti set up a ping-pong table to use during improvisational setups as part of the casting process. During post-production, Safdie got Robert Pattinson to make a cameo appearance as the voice of an off-screen British Open umpire. Mordechai Rubinstein, a New York City fashion blogger, and friend of Safdie, appears uncredited as a shoe store salesman. Kim Hastreiter, co-founder of Paper, a New York City magazine, was cast by Venditti and appears uncredited as a shoe store customer.

=== Production design ===
Safdie contacted veteran production designer Jack Fisk to work on the project. Having been inspired by the Ken Jacobs film Orchard Street (1955) after seeing a screening at the Museum of Modern Art, Fisk and the film's crew reportedly studied the film in preparation for creating Marty Supreme's sets. To match the 1950s New York City setting, Fisk and his team built several pieces to block modern buildings and signs, including a delivery truck for Jewish newspaper The Forward, using old reference photos for the design. The original Forward building also appeared in the background of several scenes alongside the truck. Fisk was able to build the Lawrence's Broadway Table Tennis Club, which was demolished, with help from blueprints and black-and-white photos. Rossein was able to get a 16mm recording of the building which gave them an idea of the color palette. Even though Norkin's Shoe Shop, where Marty works, was a real location, the crew built modular units of the storefront to avoid a modern hotel nearby. For the scenes set in Auschwitz, the crew built the barracks inside the same New Jersey house they used to film a scene featuring a farm. Safdie wanted the city to feel real, and became obsessed with the garbage on the streets in particular. Set decorator Adam Willis proposed wetting the trash, so the actors felt the grit of the environment their characters lived in. Safdie wanted Fisk to paint Marty's room white or off-white but Fisk declined to do so as it would not be period-accurate.

=== Filming ===
Principal photography began in New York City on September 23, 2024, with set photos of Chalamet released the following week. Production wrapped on December 5, 2024, with, according to Odessa A'zion, a scene between her and Fran Drescher being filmed. Additional filming later took place in Japan in February 2025. Only key members of the crew traveled to the country, and a Japanese crew was hired, having only a week of prep before shooting.

Cinematographer Darius Khondji, who worked with Safdie on Uncut Gems, shot Marty Supreme mostly on 35mm film (although there were some digital shots), using Arriflex cameras and vintage Panavision C Series and B Series anamorphic lenses to recreate the feel of the 1950s and atmosphere of the movie. Khondji explained: "I knew we were going to be filming very close to (the actors), as if we were using a magnifier ... and so, we selected lenses that would take us in this direction, mostly very long anamorphics, almost like having binoculars or a magnifier when looking at the characters. We used long zooms, too." Khondji used 65mm, 75mm or 100mm anamorphic long lenses for medium or medium-tight shots. Most of the film was shot with two cameras together. The $60–70 million budget made it A24's most expensive film, surpassing Civil War (2024).

Chalamet said that Safdie encouraged him to do some of his own stunts in the movie. For example, according to Kevin O'Leary, a stunt double was initially intended to stand in for Chalamet in the paddle spanking scene opposite O'Leary, but Chalamet insisted on performing it himself. The prop paddle then broke during the first take, so a real paddle had to be used. O'Leary came up with one of his last lines of dialogue, in which he refers to himself as a vampire. In January 2026, during a conversation with Sean Baker for the A24 podcast, Safdie revealed one of the original ideas for the ending was for an older Marty to be taking his granddaughter to a concert in the 1980s, only for O'Leary's Milton Rockwell to be revealed as an actual vampire and bite Marty in the neck. This ending, originally suggested by O'Leary, was initially supported by Safdie and Bronstein, who went as far to make "digital teeth" for O'Leary, but was ultimately rejected by studio executives. O'Leary also suggested that the film should end with A'zion's character dying in childbirth, which Safdie decided was too dark.

The director wanted Chalamet's eyes to look smaller, so he made him wear prescription glasses with contact lenses underneath, which impaired his vision temporarily. Make-up artist Michael Fontaine applied pockmarks, freckles and nicks to Chalamet's face to give him a more weathered, street appearance. The effect was so convincing that Paltrow thought it was real, privately suggesting to the actor that he try micro-needling to fix his acne scars. For the ping-pong scenes, Chalamet trained for months and was coached by Diego Schaaf and former American Olympian Wei Wang.

=== Post-production ===
Marty Supreme was finished on the eve of its premiere at the New York Film Festival. The color grading was done by Yvan Lucas at Company 3. Alongside Khondji, they created a 4K DCP, as well as developing 70mm and 35mm prints. Safdie did not have final cut privilege in his contract but it was not an issue as A24 fully supported his vision. The original ending, playing over the credits and involving showing Marty's future with Chalamet in aging prosthetics, was filmed but not used in the final cut. Several other scenes were cut for pacing.

=== Music ===
The score was composed by electronic artist Daniel Lopatin. Lopatin, who had already worked with the Safdie brothers in their previous films, first read the script in 2023. Lopatin used a Spotify playlist to guide him through the composition, which included music from artists such as New Order, Tears for Fears, Fats Domino and Constance Demby. Safdie and Lopatin worked on the score for around 10 weeks at a studio space in Manhattan. Mixing took place at Electric Lady Studios in New York City. Musician Weyes Blood provided background vocals for the soundtrack. Peter Gabriel's song "I Have the Touch" is featured in the film, which Gabriel was thankful for.

Other songs that appear in the film are:

- "Change" by Tears for Fears
- "Forever Young" by Alphaville
- "I Have the Touch" by Peter Gabriel
- "Everybody's Got to Learn Sometime" by the Korgis
- "How High the Moon" by Les Paul
- "Don't Let the Stars Get in Your Eyes" by Perry Como
- "The Fat Man" by Fats Domino
- "The Order of Death" by Public Image Ltd
- "The Perfect Kiss" by New Order
- "Belle Reve" by Alex North
- "Rile's Wiles" by Paul Sikivie
- "Everybody Wants to Rule the World" by Tears for Fears
- "James Long is a Pretty Cool Guy" by James Long and the Turnbridgers

== Historical accuracy ==
Marty Supreme tells a fictional story. Its protagonist is loosely inspired by Marty Reisman, a New York player who won 22 major table tennis titles between 1946 and 2002, among them two U.S. Opens and a British Open. Safdie learned about Reisman through his memoir The Money Player, although the film's plot does not come from the book. Reisman was born in New York in February 1930 to Russian Jewish immigrants and grew up on the Lower East Side, where his father was a taxi driver and heavy gambler. As a teenager he hustled players into money matches at a club on Broadway, which Paul Stimpson of Table Tennis England wrote the film depicts "reasonably accurately"; Stimpson added that "much of the rest of the storyline is fictitious". Like Mauser, Reisman played at Lawrence's club in Midtown Manhattan, and he did work as a shoe salesman at one point, though not as a young man or in a relative's shop.

The film's tournament rivalry draws on the 1952 World Table Tennis Championships in Bombay, Reisman's last world championships. He lost in the second round to Japan's Hiroji Satoh, who went on to become the first world champion to use sponge on his bat. Satoh's racket was covered in thick foam rubber, which muted the sound of the ball, and Reisman later complained that Satoh and the sponge racket had "destroyed his game". Time noted that the real tournament was held in Bombay (now Mumbai), not in London as the film shows. The film's Koto Endo is a fictional character, based partly on Satoh and partly on the actor who plays him, Koto Kawaguchi, a deaf table tennis champion. Reisman and his teammate Doug Cartland also played a U.S.–Japan match in a packed movie theater in Osaka, sponsored by a Japanese ball maker that paid them to endorse balls bearing their names; Ellin Stein of Slate suggested this may have inspired the film's orange "Marty Supreme" balls.

Several other episodes are adapted from Reisman's life. He toured with the Harlem Globetrotters from 1949 to 1951 with Cartland, but unlike Mauser he enjoyed the experience. During a tournament in London he and a teammate moved into the more expensive Cumberland Hotel and charged the cost to the English Table Tennis Association, which refused to pay; the film turns this into a suite at the Ritz. Milton Rockwell and Kay Stone appear to be invented; Reisman's memoir mentions only one romance from his tours, with an 18-year-old in Rio. Bela Kletzki's account of his time in Auschwitz resembles a true story that Reisman tells in his memoir about the Polish champion Alojzy Ehrlich.

== Themes ==
Safdie and Bronstein have described the film as a story of the Jewish experience; Susan Hornik of Aish added that Marty himself is not an embodiment of Jewish values. Safdie told NPR that after World War II the idea of Jewish pride "kind of blossoms", and that the survival of the Holocaust "was something to kind of be proud of". At a press event for the film he said that because it was "a story about Jewish people" he needed Jewish actors; the cast includes Fran Drescher, Gwyneth Paltrow, Odessa A'zion, Sandra Bernhard and Isaac Mizrahi. Darren Richman of Jewish News noted that Marty proudly shows a Star of David when he plays in front of a crowd. Critics disagreed about how Jewish the film is. On the Jewish Currents podcast On the Nose, Nathan Goldman read it as a postwar white ethnic story about striving and assimilation, while Mitch Abidor argued that Marty is "not enough of a Jew and not enough of a scumbag" for the film to work, and that he reads as Jewish mainly because other characters say so.

The flashback in which Bela Kletzki recounts sharing honey with starving fellow prisoners at Auschwitz, based on the experiences of Alojzy Ehrlich, drew particular attention. Safdie called the story "more evocative and more telling than some Holocaust films" he had seen. Richman found the scene not offensive but "the most moving moment in the film". Drawing on his grandfather and his grandfather's friends, who survived the camps and were "intent on making every second of the rest of their lives count", he wrote that his grandfather "had chutzpah, but, unlike Marty, he was unambiguously a hero", and described Marty's behavior as "dictated by ego and therefore consistently selfish". On On the Nose, David Klion described the honey story as "the exact opposite of how Marty comports himself throughout the entire movie"; Goldman argued that when Marty invokes Kletzki's experience against the antisemitic Rockwell, he borrows "his friend-nemesis's more certifiably meaningful Jewish experience" to assert his own Jewishness.

Writers also connected Marty's ambition with the United States after the war. In Variety, Peter Debruge connected Marty's drive with the country's postwar emergence as a global superpower, describing Marty as "a round-the-clock hustler" who "feels justified in achieving his goals by any means necessary". According to Susan Hornik of Aish, Safdie and Bronstein used the character to explore how winning World War II "ignited the idea of the American dream". Klion read Rockwell's vampire monologue as a picture of capital itself, set against Japan's postwar opening to American markets, and saw Marty's wish to represent America as a bold goal for a Jewish player in 1952.

== Release ==
Marty Supreme had its world premiere as a "secret screening" in the Main Slate of the 2025 New York Film Festival, on October 6, 2025. It was released in the United States on December 25, 2025, by A24.

=== Marketing ===
To promote the film Chalamet posted on his social media a staged recording of a Zoom call with A24's marketing team, where he presented increasingly ridiculous promotional ideas. It was written and directed by Chalamet. The meta-video was praised by GQ as a "pitch-perfect, dryly hilarious satire of both corporate meeting culture and movie star narcissism". One of the ideas presented in the video was actually realized: flying a bright orange rented blimp (tailnumber N614LG) with "Marty Supreme" imprinted on each side across the United States. Chalamet's visual artist drawing of the blimp in the video was also featured as a Google easter egg when searching for Chalamet or Marty Supreme on Google. In December, Safdie and the cast were present to light the Empire State Building orange, similar to another idea featured in the video, ahead of the New York premiere. That same month Chalamet uploaded a video of himself on top of the Las Vegas' Sphere, the first person to do so, to promote the theatrical release. The Sphere's team presented the idea to Chalamet, who later designed and funded the stunt in collaboration with CashApp.

Chalamet collaborated with the clothing brand Nahmias to design merchandise including a jacket that Chalamet sent to athletes and celebrities he considered "great", such as Susan Boyle, Tom Brady, Misty Copeland, Stephen Curry, Karl-Anthony Towns, Anthony Edwards, Charles Leclerc, Patti LuPone, Bill Nye, Michael Phelps, Declan Rice, Ringo Starr, Denis Villeneuve, Victor Wembanyama and Lamine Yamal. Other celebrities such as Kid Cudi, Frank Ocean, Fakemink, Charli XCX, Kendall Jenner, Kylie Jenner, Justin Bieber and his wife Hailey Bieber were also seen sporting the jacket. At first, it was conceived to be worn only by the actor during the press tour, but after becoming involved, A24 decided to also release it to the public. In November, a temporary pop-up store was set up in New York City, which Chalamet visited. Tyler Okonma's Golf Wang street-wear brand sold hoodies, t-shirts and hats branded with Marty Supreme through their website.

During promotional interviews Chalamet was asked about widely reported rumors that he was the secret identity behind the masked British rapper EsDeeKid and gave non-committal answers, such as, "All will be revealed in due time." On December 19, 2025, Chalamet posted a video on social media of him appearing alongside EsDeeKid in a remix of his track "4 Raws", adding a verse of his own to the song in which he mentions Marty Supreme. In January 2026, a statue of Chalamet as Marty Mauser was unveiled at the Italian National Museum of Cinema to promote the film's release in Italy.

=== Home media ===
Marty Supreme was released on VOD on February 10, 2026. On streaming, the film released on April 24, 2026 on HBO Max.

== Reception ==
=== Box office ===
As of November 22, 2026, Marty Supreme has grossed $96 million in the United States and Canada and $96.4 million in other territories for a worldwide total of $192.4 million.

Marty Supreme began its limited release in six theaters in Los Angeles and New York City on December 19. It made $875,000 in its opening weekend for a per-theater average of $145,933, the highest ever for A24 and the best overall since La La Land (2016). It was projected to gross $12–20 million from 2,668 theaters over its four-day Christmas frame. It made $9.8 million on its first day of wide release (which included $2 million from Christmas Eve previews), surpassing projections and finishing second behind Avatar: Fire and Ash, over the four-day Christmas weekend with $27.3 million ($17.7 million in its traditional 3-day weekend). The film made $12.5 million, $7.6 million, and $6.6 million in its second, third and fourth weekends, becoming A24's highest-grossing film at the domestic box office.

Marty Supreme also became A24's highest-grossing film in the UK, earning $21.7 million as of February 24, 2026. According to Box Office Mojo, its largest markets after the UK were France ($8.8 million), Australia ($6.8 million), Germany ($6.4 million), Russia and the CIS ($5.6 million) and Italy ($5.6 million). It grossed $2.9 million in the Netherlands and $1.6 million in Belgium.

=== Critical response ===
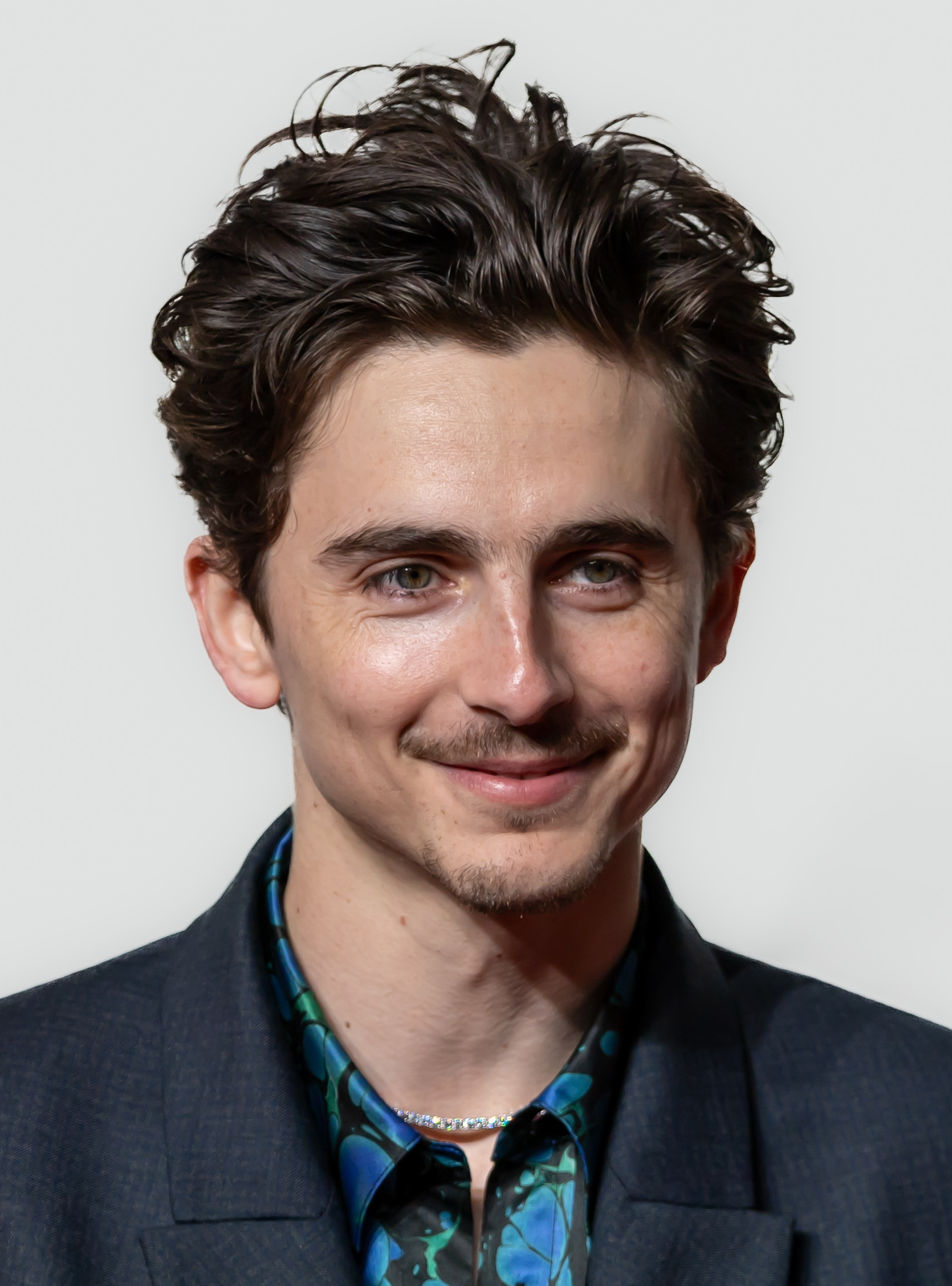
Timothée Chalamet's performance received widespread acclaim, with several critics deeming it his best to date. It won him the Golden Globe and Critics' Choice awards for Best Actor and earned him an Academy Award for Best Actor nomination.

On the review aggregator website Rotten Tomatoes, 93% of 364 critics' reviews are positive, with an average rating of 8.6/10. The website's consensus reads: "Serving up Timothée Chalamet at his most infectiously charismatic, Marty Supreme is a propulsive epic that realizes its sky-high aspirations even while it critiques its indelible hero's toxic ambition." Metacritic, which uses a weighted average, assigned the film a score of 89 out of 100, based on 58 critics, indicating "universal acclaim". Audiences polled by CinemaScore gave Marty Supreme an average grade of "B+" on an A+ to F scale.

Chalamet's performance was praised, with some commentators calling it career-defining. David Ehrlich of IndieWire referred to it as "one of the most colossal movie performances of the 21st century", while Brian Tallerico of RogerEbert.com called it the best performance of Chalamet's career. Caryn James of the BBC described Chalamet as "engaging" and wrote that the film was fresh, funny, and exhilarating largely because of his presence. Rolling Stone critic David Fear likened the performance to the early work of Al Pacino and Dustin Hoffman, describing it as "a constant state of motion even when standing still." IGN critic Michael Calabro wrote that Chalamet's portrayal had the same intensity Pacino displayed in Dog Day Afternoon, combined with the charisma of Paul Newman in The Sting. Critics from Jewish News and The Critic described Marty as embodying Jewish chutzpah, portraying him as an audacious hustler whose arrogance and opportunism drive the film's narrative. Chief film critic Kevin Maher of The Times wrote that Chalamet channeled the classic roles of Robert De Niro through an intense portrayal of ambition and ego. Odessa A'zion was also singled out by Chris Evangelista of /Film and Ian Sandwell of Digital Spy, who described her performance as "immensely charming" and the strongest outside of Chalamet. The performances of Gwyneth Paltrow, Kevin O'Leary, Tyler Okonma, Abel Ferrara, and Koto Kawaguchi were also praised.

The Guardian's Peter Bradshaw gave Marty Supreme five out of five stars, calling it "a spectacular screwball ping-pong nightmare". He praised the pacing, describing it as "a marathon sprint of gonzo calamities and uproar". David Rooney of The Hollywood Reporter described the film as "Uncut Gems meets Catch Me If You Can". Rooney praised the casting in mixing seasoned actors with non-traditional performers such as O'Leary, Okonma, and Kawaguchi, comparing the approach to Ken Jacobs' 1955 documentary short, Orchard Street. Marshall Shaffer of Slant Magazine gave the film four out of four, writing: "Marty Supreme offers a clear-eyed look at the hollow promise of American self-reliance. [Safdie and Bronstein] see through the terminology used to sell outsiders on social advancement—purpose, obligation, sacrifice—as tools that reinforce the stranglehold of the rich."

Critics praised Safdie's direction, with Maher highlighting his "effective bravado" and confident directorial approach. Shaffer commended Safdie's collaboration with Ronald Bronstein on the screenplay and editing. Fear praised Jack Fisk's production design and Daniel Lopatin's musical score. Along with the score, Darius Khondji's cinematography was lauded by Jamie Graham of Empire. In a more critical review, William Bibbiani of TheWrap felt the story became arbitrary by the end. Stephanie Zacharek of Time also felt the film relied too much on amorality and lacked an emotional core, stating: "For Safdie, a movie seems to be just an excuse for a million and one digressions and distractions; he'll throw anything at the wall to see if it sticks."

=== Accolades ===
Marty Supreme received numerous awards and nominations, including eight nominations at the 31st Critics' Choice Awards, three nominations at the 83rd Golden Globe Awards and 32nd Actor Awards, eleven at the 79th British Academy Film Awards and nine nominations at the 98th Academy Awards. The film did not win any of its nine Academy Award nominations; the Best Actor award went to Michael B. Jordan for Sinners. It also lost in all eleven of its BAFTA categories, with Chalamet losing Best Actor in a Leading Role to Robert Aramayo for I Swear; Variety reported that this tied the record for the most BAFTA losses in a single night, shared with Women in Love (1969) and Finding Neverland (2004). Its three nominations at the 32nd Actor Awards, for Chalamet, A'zion and the cast, also went to other nominees. Chalamet's performance has been awarded several accolades, including a Golden Globe Award and Critics' Choice Award for Best Actor. It was selected as one of the top ten films of the year by the National Board of Review and the American Film Institute.

== See also ==
- London in film
- List of films set in New York City
