= Good Sam (TV series) =

American medical drama television series

- Genre: Medical drama
- Created by: Katie Wech
- Starring: Sophia Bush; Jason Isaacs; Skye P. Marshall; Michael Stahl-David; Omar Maskati; Wendy Crewson; Edwin Hodge; Davi Santos
- Music by: Zach Robinson
- Country of origin: United States
- Original language: English
- No. of seasons: 1
- No. of episodes: 13

Production
- Executive producers: Tamra Davis; Frank Siracusa; John Weber; Joanna Klein; Jennie Snyder Urman; Katie Wech
- Producers: Sophia Bush; Jason Isaacs; Norman Denver; Aaron Miller; Chris Agoston
- Production locations: Oakville, Ontario, Canada
- Cinematography: Celiana Cardenas; Michael McMurray; Kristin Fieldhouse
- Editors: David L. Bertman; Gregg Featherman; Benjamin Bumgarner; Christina Castro
- Running time: 43 minutes
- Production companies: Kitchen Door, Inc. (episodes 4–13); Sutton Street Productions; CBS Studios

Original release
- Network: CBS
- Release: January 5 – May 4, 2022

Good Sam is an American medical drama television series created by Katie Wech for CBS, starring Sophia Bush and Jason Isaacs which premiered on January 5, 2022. In May 2022, after receiving low ratings over the course of their 13 episode season, the series was canceled.

== Premise ==
Heart surgeon Dr. Samantha Griffith (Sophia Bush) becomes the top surgeon at Lakeshore Sentinel Hospital after her boss and father, Dr. Rob Griffith (Jason Isaacs), falls into a coma. Her life becomes complicated when he awakens and wants to resume surgery, which means Samantha would be supervising him.

== Cast ==
- Sophia Bush as Dr. Sam Griffith, Cardiac Fellow and Interim Chief at Lakeshore Sentinel Hospital
- Jason Isaacs as Dr. Rob "Griff" Griffith, one of the country's best cardiothoracic surgeons, the hospital's current Chief Medical Officer and Sam's father
- Skye P. Marshall as Dr. Lex Trulie, Sam's best friend who is having an affair with Griff
- Michael Stahl-David as Dr. Caleb Tucker, Sam's ex and member of her team
- Omar Maskati as Dr. Isan M. Shah, a doctor on Sam's team
- Wendy Crewson as Vivian Katz, a former orthopedic surgeon, the hospital's former Chief Medical Officer, Sam's mother, and Griff's ex-wife
- Edwin Hodge as Malcolm A. Kingsley, part of the Kingsley Family Foundation, Lakeshore's main donor, and the hospital's new Director of Finance
- Davi Santos as Dr. Joey Costa, a doctor on Sam's team

=== Recurring ===
- Yanna McIntosh as Dr. Rhonda Glass
- Evan Parke as Byron Kingsley, Malcolm's father
- Stephen Tracey as Tim Davis, Joey's boyfriend of five years
- Sendhil Ramamurthy as Asher Pyne, Vivian's husband
- Victoria Rowell as Tina Kingsley, Malcolm's mother
- Travis Van Winkle as Dr. Eric Kace
- Gerardo Celasco as Dr. Nick Vega

=== Special guest stars ===
- Hilarie Burton as Gretchen Taylor
- Bethany Joy Lenz as Amy Taylor

== Episodes ==
No.	Title	Directed by	Written by	Original release date	U.S. viewers (millions)
1	"Pilot"	Tamra Davis	Katie Wech	January 5, 2022	2.72
Dr. Rob “Griff” Griffith, the Chief of Surgery at Lakeshore Sentinel Hospital, is shot at his hospital and he falls into coma. Six months later Dr. Sam Griffith, his daughter, takes over as the new chief of surgery. Griff wakes from his coma on the night of Sam's reception as the new chief. Sam meets Malcolm A. Kingsley, the hospital's new Director of Finance. Griff rejoins the hospital as a proctor but starts interfering with Sam's work undermining her authority. Sam finds out that Dr. Lex Trulie, her best friend and fellow doctor, is having an affair with Griff. Sam performs a complicated heart transplant successfully with Griff's help.
2	"Natural Order"	Randy Zisk	Katie Wech	January 12, 2022	2.43
Dr. Griffith fights to keep her new leadership role as chief of surgery when her father takes his case for reinstatement to the hospital board. Dr. Caleb Tucker forms an unexpected connection to a patient battling a mystery condition.
3	"Butt of the Joke"	Gina Rodriguez	Jen Klein	January 19, 2022	2.40
When Dr. Sam Griffith (Sophia Bush) refuses to concede her role as chief, her father Griff orchestrates a costly surprise. Also, Sam's mother, hospital administrator Vivian, turns to her new spouse, therapist Asher Pyne, for help navigating the battle between her daughter and ex-husband.
4	"Attachments"	Gina Lamar	Joshua Troke	January 26, 2022	2.63
When Dr. Sam Griffith tracks down a deep-pocketed anonymous hospital donor, she's shocked to discover why the donor is so loyal to her father, Griff. Also, Griff offers to mentor his daughter and assure her succession.
5	"Wake Up"	Kate Woods	Natalia Fernandez	February 2, 2022	2.59
When a gunshot victim is rushed to the emergency room, the incident triggers flashbacks to the aftermath of Griff's own shooting.
6	"Truce"	Marie Jamora	Lydia Teffera	February 23, 2022	1.95
Secrets revealed at a major fundraising gala for the hospital threaten to end a tenuous truce between Dr. Sam Griffith and her father. Cardiothoracic resident Dr. Lex Trulie makes a decision that could alter her career trajectory.
7	"Chronic Insult"	Craig Siebels	Bashir Gavriel	March 2, 2022	1.90
8	"Keep Talking"	Oz Scott	Jeremy Svenson	March 23, 2022	2.15
9	"A Light in the Storm"	Tessa Blake	Sara Casey & Manuel Herrera	March 30, 2022	2.13
10	"I Thought I Lost You"	Bosede Williams	Anna Mackey & Bashir Gavriel	April 6, 2022	1.87
11	"Family/Business"	Jason Isaacs	Lydia Teffera & Jeremy Svenson	April 20, 2022	1.74
12	"The Griffith Technique"	Milena Govich	Natalia Fernandez & Joshua Troke	April 27, 2022	2.05
13	"To Whom It May Concern"	Craig Siebels	Jen Klein	May 4, 2022	2.10

== Production ==
=== Development ===
On September 19, 2019, CBS put Good Sam into development. Writer Katie Wech produced the series with Jennie Snyder Urman through her Sutton St. Productions and CBS Television Studios. In February 2020, the series was given a pilot order, with further development paused during the COVID-19 pandemic. On May 14, 2021, the show was given a series order. On May 12, 2022, CBS canceled the series after one season.

=== Casting ===
In February 2020, Sophia Bush was cast as lead role. In March 2020, Jason Isaacs joined the main cast. In January 2021, Skye P. Marshall and Michael Stahl-David were cast in starring roles. In February 2021, Edwin Hodge joined the cast in a starring role. In January 2022, it was reported that Sendhil Ramamurthy was cast in a recurring role while Hilarie Burton and Bethany Joy Lenz are set to guest star. In February 2022, Victoria Rowell joined the cast in a recurring role.

=== Filming ===
Principal photography for the series began on October 18, 2021 and concluded on March 24, 2022, in Mississauga and Oakville, Ontario. Filming took place at the University of Toronto Mississauga in 2021.

== Reception ==
=== Critical response ===
The review aggregator website Rotten Tomatoes reported a 63% approval rating with an average rating of 7.5/10, based on 8 critic reviews. Metacritic, which uses a weighted average, assigned a score of 56 out of 100 based on 5 critics, indicating "mixed or average reviews".

=== Ratings ===
Viewership and ratings per episode of Good Sam
No.	Title	Air date	Rating (18–49)	Viewers (millions)	DVR (18–49)	DVR viewers (millions)	Total (18–49)	Total viewers (millions)
1	"Pilot"	January 5, 2022	0.3	2.72	—N/a	—N/a	—N/a	—N/a
2	"Natural Order"	January 12, 2022	0.2	2.43	—N/a	—N/a	—N/a	—N/a
3	"Butt of the Joke"	January 19, 2022	0.3	2.40	—N/a	—N/a	—N/a	—N/a
4	"Attachments"	January 26, 2022	0.3	2.63	—N/a	—N/a	—N/a	—N/a
5	"Wake Up"	February 2, 2022	0.4	2.59	—N/a	—N/a	—N/a	—N/a
6	"Truce"	February 23, 2022	0.3	1.95	—N/a	—N/a	—N/a	—N/a
7	"Chronic Insult"	March 2, 2022	0.2	1.90	—N/a	—N/a	—N/a	—N/a
8	"Keep Talking"	March 23, 2022	0.2	2.15	—N/a	—N/a	—N/a	—N/a
9	"A Light in the Storm"	March 30, 2022	0.2	2.13	—N/a	—N/a	—N/a	—N/a
10	"I Thought I Lost You"	April 6, 2022	0.2	1.87	—N/a	—N/a	—N/a	—N/a
11	"Family/Business"	April 20, 2022	0.2	1.74	—N/a	—N/a	—N/a	—N/a
12	"The Griffith Technique"	April 27, 2022	0.2	2.05	—N/a	—N/a	—N/a	—N/a
13	"To Whom It May Concern"	May 4, 2022	0.3	2.10	—N/a	—N/a	—N/a	—N/a
