= Skye P. Marshall =

American actress

- Born: Chicago, Illinois, United States
- Education: Northeastern Illinois University
- Occupation: Actress
- Spouse: Edwin Hodge (m. 2024)
- Relatives: Aldis Hodge (brother-in-law)

Skye P. Marshall is an American actress. She is best known for playing Olympia Lawrence opposite Kathy Bates in the critically acclaimed CBS legal drama Matlock (2024–present). For this role, she has received nominations for two Critics' Choice Television Awards for Best Supporting Actress in a Drama Series, as well as nominations for a Gotham Television Award and an Astra Television Award.

Marshall’s feature work includes comedic thriller Coup!, opposite Peter Sarsgaard and Billy Magnussen, which premiered at the 2023 Venice Film Festival, as well as Qasim Basir’s critically acclaimed Sundance pic To Live and Die and Live.

Marshall's other television roles include Mambo Marie on Netflix's Chilling Adventures of Sabrina (2020), Kara Fowdy on the CW/Berlanti Productions superhero series Black Lightning (2018), and Dr Lex Trulie on CBS' medical drama Good Sam (2022).

In addition to the screen work, Marshall is a veteran of the United States Air Force.

== Early life and education ==
Marshall was born and raised in Chicago. After high school, she attended Hampton University for one year, before joining the United States Air Force. After completing her service, Marshall returned to Chicago where she graduated from Northeastern Illinois University, with honors, earning a Bachelor of Arts degree, majoring in Communication, Media & Theatre (CMT Program). She then moved to New York City to work at a pharmaceutical marketing firm, while also training at the Stella Adler Studio of Acting and the Broadway Dance Center. She later left her corporate job and moved to Los Angeles to pursue an acting career.

== Career ==
=== Film ===
Marshall's first major film role was as Towanda Braxton in the 2016 musical biopic Toni Braxton: Unbreak My Heart. That year she also appeared alongside Josh Duhamel, Al Pacino and Sir Anthony Hopkins in the thriller Misconduct. She later went on to appear in the 2018 war drama film Indivisible. In 2022, she shot the dark comedy film Coup! with Peter Sarsgaard, Billy Magnussen and Sarah Gadon. In 2023, she appeared in Qasim Basir's semi autobiographical film To Live and Die and Live.

=== Television ===
Marshall had guest star appearances on NCIS, Major Crimes, and Grey's Anatomy before having recurring roles on ABC's The Fix, The CW's Black Lightning and Netflix's Chilling Adventures of Sabrina. She landed her first series regular role in 2021 as Dr. Lex Trulie on the CBS medical drama Good Sam alongside Sophia Bush.

In 2023, she joined the cast of a pilot for legal drama series of Matlock, with Kathy Bates in the title role. The project was commissioned for a series, broadcasting on CBS since September 22, 2024. The show has been critically acclaimed and is considered to be Marshall's breakout role, with her performance being praised by critics and receiving numerous Best Supporting Actress in a Drama Series award nominations, including at the 30th and 31st Critics' Choice Awards.

== Personal life ==
Marshall married fellow actor and former Good Sam co-star Edwin Hodge on June 29, 2024 at Carondelet House in Los Angeles.

== Television ==
Year	Title	Role	Notes
2024–present	Matlock	Olympia Lawrence	Main Role Won - Celebration of Black Cinema & Television Supporting Actress Award for Television (2025) Nominated - Critics' Choice Awards Best Supporting Actress in a Drama Series (2025, 2026) Nominated - Black Reel Television Awards Outstanding Supporting Performance in a Drama Series (2025) Nominated - Gotham TV Awards Outstanding Supporting Performance in a Drama Series (2025) Nominated - Astra Television Awards Best Supporting Actress in a Drama Series (2025)
2022–2023	East New York	Nadia Nye	Episodes: "Court on the Street" and "Personal Shopper"
2022	Good Sam	Dr. Lex Trulie	Main Role
2020	Chilling Adventures of Sabrina	Mambo Marie	Recurring (Season 2)
2019	The Hypnotist's Love Story	Rosie	Unaired Pilot
2019	This Is Us	Trish Lawrence	Episode: "The Dinner and the Date"
2019	9-1-1	Sonia Moss	Episode: "Broken"
2019	The Fix	Angela	Recurring; 3 episodes
2018	The Rookie	Kai De Vera	Episode: "The Good, the Bad, and the Ugly"
2018	Black Lightning	Kara Fowdy	Recurring; 10 episodes
2018	NCIS	Sara Carter	Episode: "One Step Forward"
2017	Major Crimes	Makisha Selby	Episode: "Conspiracy Theory: Part 3"
2017	Grey's Anatomy	Mary Hodges	Episode: "Who Is He (And What Is He To You)?"
2016	Shameless	June	2 episodes
2015	In the Cut	Ella	Episode: "Gold Diggers for Dummies"
2015	Public Morals	Tanya Johnson	Episode: "Ladies Night"
2015	Family Time	Brenda	Episode: "Air RNB"
2015	Almost 30	Tiffany	Episode: "Almost Dating"
2014	Love Handles	Jade	7 episodes
2013	Dexter	Receptionist	Episode: "Remember the Monsters?"
2012	The Mentalist	Sharice	Episode: "Cherry Picked"
2011	BlackBoxTV	Sam Palmer	Episode: "More Than You Can Chew"
2011	8 Days a Week	Zoe Daniels	10 episodes
2010	House	Patient Visitor	Episode: "Office Politics"

== Film ==
Year	Title	Role
2025	Park Avenue	Tina O'Neill
2024	Daft State	Sakura
2023	To Live and Die and Live	Asia
2023	Coup!	Ruth Tidwell
2022	A Lot of Nothing	Marley
2022	To Her, with Love	Kayla Scott
2022	MVP	Patricia
2020	A Nice Girl Like You	Dr. Becker
2018	Indivisible	Sgt. Shonda Peterson
2016	Misconduct	Hatty
2016	9 Rides	Abused Woman
2016	Toni Braxton: Unbreak My Heart	Towanda Braxton
2014	For Love or Money	Sapphire
2014	Let's be Cops	DEA Agent
2013	The Advocates	Lucy Lara
2012	A Broken Code	Trixxy Robinson
2012	Paranormal Adoption	Nurse Crystal
2012	Note to Self	Mary Dexter
2011	Detention	News Reporter
2010	Reservation	Tawanna Stewart
2010	The Haunting of Katie Malone	Sorority Girl

== Awards and nominations ==
Year	Award	Category	Nominated work	Result
2025	Critics' Choice Television Awards	Best Supporting Actress in a Drama Series	Matlock	Nominated
2025	Black Reel Television Awards	Outstanding Supporting Performance in a Drama Series	Matlock	Nominated
2025	Celebration of Black Cinema & Television	Supporting Actress Award for Television	Matlock	Won
2025	Gotham TV Awards	Outstanding Supporting Performance in a Drama Series	Matlock	Nominated
2025	Astra Television Awards	Best Supporting Actress in a Drama Series	Matlock	Nominated
2026	Critics' Choice Television Awards	Best Supporting Actress in a Drama Series	Matlock	Nominated
