= Matlock (2024 TV series) =

American legal drama television series

- Genre: Legal drama Crime drama
- Based on: Matlock by Dean Hargrove
- Developed by: Jennie Snyder Urman
- Starring: Kathy Bates; Skye P. Marshall; Jason Ritter; David Del Rio; Leah Lewis; Aaron Harris; Sam Anderson
- Music by: Zach Robinson
- Country of origin: United States
- Original language: English
- No. of seasons: 2
- No. of episodes: 35

Production
- Executive producers: Frank Siracusa; John Weber; John Will; Kat Coiro; Kathy Bates; Joanna Klein; Eric Christian Olsen; Jennie Snyder Urman; Nicki Renna; Jeffrey Lieber; Amanda Tudesco
- Producer: Thom J. Pretak
- Cinematography: Craig Wrobleski; James Bagdonas; John Tanzer
- Editors: Gregg Featherman; Scott Melendez; Kyla Plewes; Christina Castro; Jane Huff; Lance Luckey
- Running time: 44 minutes
- Production companies: Sutton Street Productions; Cloud Nine Productions; CBS Studios

Original release
- Network: CBS
- Release: September 22, 2024 – present

Related
- Matlock

Matlock is an American legal drama television series that premiered with a sneak peek on September 22, 2024, before its timeslot premiere on October 17 on CBS. The show was developed by Jennie Snyder Urman, and while it shares a name with the Matlock TV series which starred Andy Griffith, it features a vastly different premise overall. In October 2024, the series was renewed for a second season which premiered on October 12, 2025. In January 2026, the series was renewed for a third season.

== Premise ==
Wealthy retired lawyer Madeline Kingston vows to get justice for the death of her daughter Ellie in the opioid epidemic. Using the persona of impoverished widow Madeline "Matty" Matlock, Kingston obtains a position at the law firm she believes hid evidence that could have saved her daughter's life. While using her formidable intellect and expertise of the law to assist the firm, she begins slowly digging her way to the truth.

Within the universe of this series, the original Matlock series aired as it did in the real world, and Ellie's love of the series inspires Madeline's alias.

== Cast and characters ==
=== Main ===
- Kathy Bates as Madeline "Matty" Matlock / Madeline Kingston, who claims to be a widowed lawyer, returning to the workforce following decades of retirement due to financial distress from her husband's gambling troubles, and having to raise her grandson following her daughter's death in a car accident. Matlock takes a job as an associate at the law firm Jacobson Moore, working with Olympia, a junior partner at the firm who becomes her boss. In fact, Kingston is wealthy and happily married, though indeed grieving the loss of her daughter who died from an opioid overdose and seeking retribution. She gave herself the alias of "Matlock" after the original television series.
- Skye P. Marshall as Olympia Lawrence, a junior partner at Jacobson Moore who becomes Matlock's boss. In the pilot episode, she is in the midst of divorcing Julian while aiming at a senior partner role with the support of her father-in-law. Olympia is reluctant to take Matty under her wing as she acknowledges that Matty is the threat to her promotion in the law firm due to her exceptional skills.
- Jason Ritter as Julian Markston, a senior partner at Jacobson Moore. In the pilot episode, he is in the midst of divorcing Olympia and engaged in a major settlement action involving a large pharmaceutical corporation.
- David Del Rio as Billy Martinez (seasons 1–2), a first-year associate at Jacobson Moore working with Olympia. Del Rio makes his last appearance in episode 7 of the second season following his dismissal from the series.
- Leah Lewis as Sarah Franklin, a first-year associate at Jacobson Moore working with Olympia
- Aaron Harris as Alfie Kingston (season 2; recurring season 1), Madeline's genius grandson who is in charge of the family's technical operations
- Sam Anderson as Edwin Kingston (season 2; recurring season 1), Madeline's husband

=== Recurring ===
- Eme Ikwuakor as Elijah, an attorney at Jacobson Moore who was in a romantic relationship with Olympia
- Beau Bridges as Howard "Senior" Markston, a managing partner at Jacobson Moore, father of Julian, and soon-to-be ex-father-in-law of Olympia. He guardedly supports Olympia's career and efforts to develop a new revenue stream for the firm, telling her how he believes being father-in-law is a forever role.
- Patricia Belcher as Mrs. B, an administrative manager at Jacobson Moore. It is later revealed her full name is Emmalyn Belvin.
- Yael Grobglas as Shae Banfield, a jury consultant at Jacobson Moore
- Piper Curda as Kira, a woman who works at the information technology (IT) department at Jacobson Moore who begins a relationship with Sarah
- Marnee Carpenter as Ellie Kingston, Matty and Edwin's deceased daughter and Alfie's mother, who appears in flashbacks
- Andrea Londo as Simone, a recently hired junior associate at Jacobson Moore who attended the same law school as Sarah
- Niko Nicotera as Joseph "Joey" Danza, Alfie's father who is a drug addict
- Justina Machado as Eva (season 2), Senior's fourth ex-wife who is also a lawyer and member of the executive committee at Jacobson Moore
- James Lesure as Lester "The Wolf" Logan (season 2)
- Justin Cornwell as Mr. Hodges (season 2), Olympia's love interest who is also a lawyer
- Sarah Wright Olsen as Gwen (season 2), a productivity consultant evaluating Jacobson Moore
- Henry Haber as Hunter (season 2), an eager new associate on Olympia's team

=== Special guest star ===
- Gina Rodriguez as Lida Gutierrez (season 2), a Department of Justice Special Agent

== Episodes ==
=== Series overview ===
Season	Episodes	Originally released		Rank	Average viewers (in millions)
Season	Episodes	First released	Last released	Rank	Average viewers (in millions)
1	19	September 22, 2024	April 17, 2025	3	15.72
2	16	October 12, 2025	April 23, 2026	13	11.50

=== Season 1 (2024–25) ===
No. overall	No. in season	Title	Directed by	Written by	Original release date	U.S. viewers (millions)
1	1	"Pilot"	Kat Coiro	Jennie Snyder Urman	September 22, 2024	7.74
Retired lawyer Madeline "Matty" Matlock lands an associate position at New York City law firm Jacobson Moore, citing financial hardship brought on by her deceased husband's gambling debts. Her first case involves Raymond Harris, who is seeking compensation for being wrongfully convicted and imprisoned for serial rape and murder. Working with fellow associates Billy and Sarah and aspiring senior partner Olympia, Matty tracks down a former prostitute who filed a police report that was not submitted into evidence, earning Raymond a $20 million settlement. Unbeknownst to everyone, Matty is really Madeline Kingston, a wealthy retiree living with her husband and grandson and determined to avenge her daughter's death, which was the result of someone at Jacobson Moore concealing documents that could have helped take opioids off the market.
2	2	"Rome, in a Day"	Kat Coiro	Jennie Snyder Urman	October 17, 2024	6.38
As Matty tries to settle in at Jacobson Moore while also trying to figure out how to get evidence connected to Ellie's death, Olympia is approached by one of her clients, Deidre, whose 18-year-old nephew Michael has been accused of killing 16-year-old Ariana Perez behind the bodega owned by his friend Charlie's family. Michael has developmental delays and has gone mute following the incident. Olympia reluctantly agrees to defend Michael, enlisting Matty, Billy, and Sarah to help her. Matty manages to find a discrepancy in the testimonies between Charlie's father Jimmy and another eyewitness, forcing Jimmy to admit there was a party in the bodega where alcohol was served to minors. A seemingly incriminating video of Michael crops up but, with Matty's help, Olympia proves Charlie doctored the video and that Ariana died in an accident while she went around back to have sex with Charlie. Olympia and her estranged husband Julian argue after she fails to tell him their daughter got sick, but eventually they make amends and decide to try and make their divorce more amicable. Matty is able to manipulate Olympia into visiting her Queens apartment so she can get the passcode for Olympia's phone.
3	3	"A Guy Named Greg"	Brad Silberling	Nicki Renna	October 24, 2024	6.48
Now starting to gain Olympia's trust, Matty is brought on to help her in a lawsuit, where a woman claims she was wrongfully fired after refusing her boss' sexual advances. Shae, a woman with a reputation for detecting lies, is brought in as a jury consultant. Matty is nervous Shae will uncover her ruse, but manages to deflect suspicion. Unable to find any evidence connected to the opioids on Olympia's phone, Matty manages to get into her laptop, but again finds nothing conclusive. The lawsuit starts to go south when a damaging recording is revealed, but Billy discovers the defendant has a history of sexual assault, enabling Olympia and Matty to make a comeback and win the case. Matty sets her sights on gaining access to the file room.
4	4	"The Rabbit and the Hawk"	Kat Coiro	Jeffrey Lieber	October 31, 2024	6.54
Matty is asked to help Olympia represent Robert, an elderly artist who is suing the owners of his building for inadvertently causing the illness that killed his wife Sandy. The case becomes tough for Olympia when her colleague and friend Darius is discovered to be leading the defense. Matty manages to gain access to the files connected to the opioid cover-up, but the ones she was after are encrypted and untraceable. The building owners provide a report insinuating Robert's slight hoarding might have made Sandy sick, derailing the lawsuit. Matty and Edwin fight over Alfie slacking off at school in order to help with her investigation. Matty befriends Robert and soon manages to prove that the building owners really were responsible for Sandy's illness. Robert is offered a settlement which he quickly accepts, but Matty discovers that Howard "Senior" Markston, Julian's father and the senior partner at Jacobson Moore, has done some legal wrangling that makes the settlement worthless. Olympia is crestfallen, but cheers up quickly when Julian takes her side. Matty and Edwin reconcile and he takes over as her investigative partner so Alfie can focus on school. Matty soon finds evidence that suggests Senior was responsible for hiding the opioid files.
5	5	"Claws"	Marie Jamora	Michelle Leibel	November 7, 2024	5.98
Jacobson Moore is tasked with an extremely big class-action case, a female ex-con suing the prison system for mistreating her while she served time for drug use. Matty soon bonds with the plaintiff, whose troubles were similar to Ellie's, but the case quickly goes awry when the plaintiff relapses and disappears; none of the other female prisoners will testify out of fear of being a snitch. Matty manages to track down the plaintiff and discovers she was manipulated into relapsing by the prison warden, so the money meant for the settlement could be used for funding the prison's rehabilitation, allowing Olympia to win the case. Edwin allows Alfie to start helping Matty again on a smaller scale. Against Matty's objections, Billy sets her up on a dating site, only for someone to recognize her.
6	6	"Sixteen Steps"	Kat Coiro	Sara Rose Feinberg	November 14, 2024	6.12
In a flashback to two years earlier, Julian and Olympia represent a lesbian couple suing a baby formula company for making contaminated formula that killed the couple's 9-month-old son. The company wins, causing Julian and Olympia's already shaky marriage to crumble. In the present, Julian and Olympia's relationship is improving and they decide to take another look at the case. Meanwhile, Matty discovers the person who recognized her on the dating site was the father of Ellie's childhood friend Tommy, another addict who has now relapsed and gone missing. Olympia manages to find evidence suggesting the formula was contaminated and, with sentimental testimony from one of the deceased baby's mothers, she wins the case. Afterwards, Julian tells Matty he's bringing her onto the WellBrexa team, which could allow Matty to get the information she needs to expose Senior's crimes.
7	7	"Belly of the Beast"	Tessa Blake	Hennah Sekander	December 5, 2024	6.32
At Christmas, Matty is put on a case for drug company WellBrexa, where a music student sues after claiming a clinical trial caused her to suffer horrible side effects. Despite her efforts, an incriminating text chain allows the case to proceed to trial and, as a result, Senior pulls both Matty and Julian off the team. However, Matty bounces back and finds a technicality that gets the text chain ruled inadmissible, so WellBrexa wins the case. Meanwhile, Julian and Olympia get back together as Billy plans to propose to his long-term girlfriend. Unfortunately, Billy is dumped after he proposes while Sarah has a successful evening with her crush. Trying to start fresh, Julian confesses to Olympia that he had an affair shortly before their separation, while Matty manages to obtain Senior's e-mail password.
8	8	"No, No Monsters"	Yangzom Brauen	Sheridan Watson	December 12, 2024	6.20
Olympia is asked to defend Nadira, a nanny at her children's school who was fired after pictures of her seemingly abusing the child in her care were posted on an online forum. Though still troubled by Julian's confession, Olympia agrees, causing her to face backlash from the other mothers. Billy becomes apathetic after his breakup, so Matty and Sarah try to help him cope. Matty manages to gain access to Senior's computer and retrieve what appears to be an incriminating email to Julian. Olympia eventually discovers that the pictures were posted by one of her friends, who was cheating on her husband, thought Nadira saw her, and therefore wanted to discredit her. Elsewhere, Matty is crestfallen when the email actually shows that Senior was in Australia when the opioid documents arrived at the office, meaning either Julian or Olympia perpetrated the cover-up. However, she manages to plant a recording device in Olympia's office.
9	9	"Friends"	Daniel Willis	John Lowe	January 30, 2025	5.78
Olympia represents Elijah's cousin Sam in a wrongful termination case. Edwin is concerned Matty is becoming too close with Olympia. Matty learns from her recording device that Julian cheated with Shae. Opposing counsel calls a surprise witness with testimony implicating Sam and her friend Khadija in the theft of a company truck. Olympia believes Khadija is framing Sam, but Sam insists that Khadija is innocent. Olympia reveals to Matty that she and Shae worked on WellBrexa's opioid case. They track Sam's stolen bluetooth earbuds to the apartment of a company manager and discover he is a union buster. The manager confesses to framing Sam for the theft after she attempted to unionize. Olympia and Julian decide to compete for a promotion, with the loser leaving the firm. Matty decides to trust Olympia and removes her as a suspect.
10	10	"Crash Helmets On"	Jennifer Lynch	Lizzie Perrin & Nicki Renna	February 6, 2025	6.25
Matty is convinced Julian is the culprit and plans to escalate tensions between him and Olympia so that his financial history is revealed in the divorce proceedings. Olympia defends a nursing home accused in the wrongful death of a resident, Walter Higgins. Matty and Sarah infiltrate the nursing home by posing as grandmother and granddaughter to investigate, but find nothing. Autry asks Matty to defend him in an eviction case and notices that Walter disabled the door sensor to his balcony, so Matty returns to the nursing home. She observes Sarah acting uncharacteristically kind to a resident with dementia; this convinces Matty to have Sarah represent Autry. Olympia finds Matty's recording device in her office, but Matty convinces her it was planted by Julian. Billy notices Matty looking for the recording device and she deflects by telling him to replace Sarah on the case. Walter's girlfriend confesses to assisting Walter in his own death, absolving the nursing home of responsibility. Billy successfully defends Autry, but Sarah swears revenge on Matty.
11	11	"A Traitor in Thine Own House"	Hannah Michielsen	Sara Rose Feinberg	February 13, 2025	5.75
Olympia is assigned to assist a former oil executive turned environmentalist who is accusing a rival company of stealing his technology. Shae is brought on as a consultant and Matty plans to use the opportunity to investigate Shae's potential involvement in hiding the WellBrexa documents. Shae is suspicious of Matty and teams up with Sarah to investigate her in turn. Matty files an HR complaint against Shae, but Shae is emboldened by Sarah discovering "a new lead" to Matty's past and flies to Georgia to meet with an unknown man. Sarah insults Billy for taking Autry's case, causing a rift between them. Using data from the company's tracking devices, Matty discovers the executive leaked his own technology. The "new lead" Shae pursued is revealed to be a ruse created by Alfie; Shae's contact is Edwin in disguise. Shae revealed to Edwin that she used to work in marketing, leading Matty to conclude the leaked documents were marketing-related. Edwin claims he lost his only clue to the identity of Alfie's father, but a final shot reveals he is lying.
12	12	"This is That Moment"	Kat Coiro	David Aguilar & Hennah Sekander	February 20, 2025	5.88
Matty learns Jacobson Moore tracks employee movements through their keycards and devises a plan to steal Julian's keycard. Meanwhile, Olympia is tasked with resolving a custody dispute between Hispanic couple Bruno and Paloma. This reminds Matty of her own custody dispute with Ellie 10 years prior, where Matty fought to gain custody of Alfie after Ellie's neglect caused him to burn his hand. Ellie was distraught and overdosed the last day of the trial, causing Matty to blame herself for Ellie's death. Julian positions himself as opposing counsel, creating tension between him and Olympia. Paloma attempts to take her son Tenoch to Mexico to visit her dying father, but is accused of kidnapping and barricades herself in an office rather than allow social workers to take Tenoch. Matty convinces Paloma to relinquish Tenoch while Sarah discovers Bruno employed a neighbor to spy on Paloma. Julian and Olympia's bickering forces the judge to hold them in contempt of court; while in holding, they reconnect and agree to start fresh. Sarah apologizes to Billy and the two reconcile. Tenoch explains that he wants his parents to stop fighting, which convinces Bruno and Paloma to agree to a 50/50 custody split. Billy is revealed to be dating Simone, Sarah's rival from law school. Matty discovers Edwin lied about losing Joey's email and confronts him.
13	13	"Pregame"	Jude Weng	Michelle Leibel & Sheridan Watson	February 27, 2025	5.77
Olympia defends Zoey, a sorority sister accused of spiking fellow sister Violet's drink with alcohol, which sent her into cardiac arrest. Olympia attempts to convince the ADA to drop the case on the grounds the evidence is circumstantial, but the situation escalates when the victim dies in the hospital. Olympia scouts Zoey's fellow sorority sisters for character witnesses, but all of them believe Zoey is guilty. The situation worsens when a receipt is uncovered linking Zoey's I.D. to an alcohol purchase the day of the party. Matty brings Alfie to Jacobson Moore for a "Family Day" event and has him provide a distraction, allowing her to obtain a record of Julian's movement history using the security station. Examination of videos taken during the party reveal that Kennedy, another student, stole Zoey's I.D. to frame her. Sarah discovers Billy is dating Simone and requests that she and Kira enter a monogamous relationship, but Kira refuses. Matty returns home to discover her younger sister Bitsy has come to visit.
14	14	"Game Day"	Kat Coiro	Jeffrey Lieber	March 6, 2025	6.14
The security record places Julian in the archives the day the WellBrexa documents were stolen. Olympia proceeds with her class action lawsuit against Slamm'd, the alcoholic drink that killed Violet. One of the jurors runs a libertarian blog, making Olympia fear he will side with Slamm'd. Bitsy discovers Matty's scheme to infiltrate Jacobson Moore and is appalled. Olympia considers calling Kennedy to testify. In private, Kennedy reveals damning evidence against Slamm'd, but refuses to testify unless the D.A. drops murder charges. Unfortunately, Olympia discovers that Violet's wealthy mother is pressuring the D.A. Matty attempts to convince Violet's mother to drop the charges, but she refuses. Billy and Sarah uncover evidence that corroborates Kennedy's testimony, but the judge refuses to admit it. Bitsy inspires Matty to show the evidence to Violet's mother, which convinces her to allow Kennedy to testify. However, after the defense digs up embarrassing footage of the lead plaintiff, he drops the case. Careful analysis of the security records makes Matty realize that the person who hid the WellBrexa documents was actually Olympia, who mixed up her keycard with Julian's.
15	15	"Game Face"	Gina Lamar	Nicki Renna & Michelle Leibel	March 13, 2025	5.81
The judge agrees to continue the lawsuit without a lead plaintiff. Matty attempts to contact the Redditor whistleblower; though the Redditor does not respond, they fall for a phishing trap that reveals they still work at Jacobson Moore. Bitsy sees Matty in court and realizes Matty based her Matlock persona on her, which offends her. Bitsy helps Alfie prepare for a date with his girlfriend. Slamm'd offers a settlement that Senior pressures Olympia to accept, but she refuses. Olympia's team discovers that Slamm'd concealed a focus group study proving that they targeted minors; this causes Matty to realize the concealed WellBrexa documents were from a study confirming that a change in the opioid coating increased the risk of addiction. Matty apologizes to Bitsy and asks her to become Alfie's godmother. Matty deduces the whistleblower is Mrs. Belvin and arranges to meet her outside of Jacobson Moore.
16	16	"The Johnson Case"	Kat Coiro	Teleplay by : Jeffrey Lieber & Tommy Cook; Story by : Tommy Cook	April 3, 2025	5.64
Matty speaks to Mrs. Belvin in disguise. Mrs. Belvin says Matty's timeline is wrong, but is offended that Matty won't reveal herself and refuses to give up more information. An old friend of Olympia's asks her to overturn the wrongful conviction of Eugene Molina, a man convicted of murder 21 years ago. Matty sends Mrs. Belvin a ransom note, demanding information in exchange for her pet dog, but Mrs. Belvin calls her bluff by retrieving her dog from her apartment. However, not knowing Matty is the perpetrator, Mrs. Belvin delivers her dog into Matty's custody for safekeeping. The police report for Molina's case reveals one witness was not called to testify; she tells the team she overheard an argument between the victim and her grandson. The team visits the grandson and retrieves a sample of his saliva for testing. Matty lies to Mrs. Belvin that someone claiming to be a friend of hers came by to take her dog, which convinces her to reveal the exact time the documents were stolen. Olympia convinces the ADA to retest a saliva sample from the original crime scene, revealing it belonged to an unrelated serial killer and absolving Molina. Edwin discovers Olympia has an alibi for the time the documents were taken. A series of flashbacks reveals Olympia has been investigating Matty and has uncovered holes in her story.
17	17	"I Was That, Too"	Hanelle Culpepper	Sarah Gertrude Shapiro	April 10, 2025	5.91
Olympia locks Matty in a room at Jacobson Moore, confiscates her phone, and demands she write down every lie she's told her. A distraught pregnant woman named Amy begs Olympia to give her a divorce from her abusive husband before the following morning. Olympia is unable to issue a divorce on such short notice and files for a restraining order instead; however, the judge rules there is not enough evidence. Matty explains her motives to Olympia and insists their friendship was genuine, but Olympia remains distrustful. Amy's husband agrees to a divorce, which Olympia finds suspicious; she tasks Matty with examining the prenuptial agreement. She finds that a divorce would give Amy's husband custody of the child. Olympia realizes that an annulment would void the prenuptial agreement, but one can only be issued with proof the marriage was fraudulent. Billy and Sarah discover Matty's phone in Olympia's purse and follow her to find Matty, but Matty conceals Olympia's actions and agrees to help with the case. An interview with the priest who officiated the marriage reveals that Amy's husband lied about how religious he was, which is sufficient grounds for the annulment. Olympia sees Ellie's obituary on the internet and realizes Matty was telling the truth. Edwin welcomes Matty home to discover she is accompanied by Olympia.
18	18	"Tricks of the Trade"	Kat Coiro	Michelle Leibel & Nicki Renna	April 17, 2025	6.15
19	19	"Tricks of the Trade"	Kat Coiro	Nicki Renna	April 17, 2025	6.15
Part One – Matty explains her theory that Julian obtained a quid pro quo payment in exchange for hiding the WellBrexa documents and suggests they investigate Julian's financials. Olympia demands Matty give her one month to exonerate Julian if they cannot find evidence he is the culprit. Senior throws Olympia a surprise party and reveals she won the partner race. Sarah chooses to defend Dino, a man accused of murdering his business partner Rob, without Olympia's knowledge or approval. Olympia is furious and attempts to pass the case to a public defender, but the judge demands Sarah provide counsel. Security footage implicates Dino in Rob's death, but he maintains his innocence. Olympia contacts Julian's mother to confirm she gave him access to the family trust as Julian claimed, but she cannot remember doing so. Olympia plans to visit the bank in person to look through Julian's accounts. Part Two – Matty dismantles her theory board while reminiscing on her relationships with the cast. Matty tells Edwin that she wants to come out of retirement and continue working as a lawyer, but Edwin does not want to raise Alfie alone. Matty plans to accompany Olympia to the bank after Sarah's court case. However, circumstances force Olympia to leave early. Matty is suspicious and demands to accompany her, but Olympia convinces Matty to trust her. Sarah reveals through documents obtained from Rob's office that Rob was poisoned by the dubious nutritional supplements he was taking, exonerating Dino. Claudia meets with Billy and reveals she is pregnant with his child. The bank records corroborate Julian's story and Olympia arranges to meet with Matty to discuss next steps. However, as Olympia is planning to leave, she discovers the WellBrexa documents hidden in Julian's safety deposit box. Julian sees Olympia and confesses to stealing the documents at Senior's behest, but insists he's a changed man and requests that Olympia help him destroy the evidence. Olympia misses her scheduled meeting with Matty. Instead, Matty finds herself visited by "Joey", a man claiming to be Alfie's father.

=== Season 2 (2025–26) ===
No. overall	No. in season	Title	Directed by	Written by	Original release date	U.S. viewers (millions)
20	1	"The Before Times"	Gina Lamar	Nicki Renna & Jennie Snyder Urman	October 12, 2025	6.58
Matty talks with Joey, who gives her Ellie's old iPod; Joey's story is suspect, and Matty chooses to wait on a paternity test before making a decision. Olympia arrives, but lies that Julian is innocent and insists they pursue Howard as Matty promised. Olympia believes one of Howard's mistresses may have relevant information and attempts to track her down. At Jacobson Moore, Olympia is given a case defending Georgia and Maya, two high school students accused of arson after nitric acid, an accelerant, was found at the scene of the crime. Georgia joins the prosecution and revises her testimony to place Maya at the scene of the crime. Olympia is revealed to have kept the Wellbrexa documents and relocated them to a safe in her house. Edwin is concerned Olympia is manipulating Matty. After examining the witness statements, Edwin realizes that ping pong balls brought to the girls' party could have caused the fire, as they contain nitric acid; with this new evidence, the fire is ruled an accident, dropping the arson charge. Billy informs the team he plans to get back together with Claudia. Olympia uncovers the name of Howard's mistress. The paternity test proves Joey is Alfie's father, but Matty also discovers he isn't sober. A series of flashbacks reveals that Matty deduced Olympia's deceit and retrieved the Wellbrexa documents while visiting her house, and now plans to send her evidence to The New York Times.
21	2	"Another Matlock"	Tessa Blake	Michelle Leibel & Jeffrey Lieber	October 16, 2025	4.20
Alfie wants to send Joey to rehab, but Matty and Edwin refuse. Matty confronts Olympia, who reveals the documents in her safe were a decoy written by generative AI. Olympia is assigned to handle a lawsuit between two gang members, but forces Matty to take the case to prevent her from contacting The New York Times. Matty and Edwin agree to send Joey to rehab. Olympia threatens to expose all of the crimes Matty has committed in her infiltration of Jacobson Moore. Matty gloats that she can manipulate any jury into siding with her, but Olympia secretly records her rant and uses it to blackmail her into withholding her information from the Times.
22	3	"Tomorrow is Still Tomorrow"	Gina Lamar	Damani Johnson & Lizzie Perrin	October 23, 2025	4.44
Because Matty missed her meeting with The New York Times, the paper contacts Jacobson Moore, alerting Senior and the other partners that information was leaked regarding the opioid cover-up. Lester, the firm's head of security, arranges private meetings with all the employees, hoping to find and discredit the leak. Matty easily bluffs her way through her interview and coaches Olympia to help her do the same. During the investigation, the team is hired by Nadine, who is suing her cousin and ex-business partner, Pierre, for opening a food truck that is identical to her fast-food restaurant. The lawsuit hits a snag when Nadine and Pierre's aunt testifies that Nadine gave her consent for Pierre to open the food truck. Mrs. Belvin meets with Matty in person and confesses to writing the Reddit post, not knowing Matty is the one who responded. Pierre offers to take Nadine on as a partner in his food truck if she buys him back into the restaurant. Nadine accepts the settlement after Matty tells her it's the best option for both of them. Olympia makes a slip of the tongue during her interview and is flagged as a person of interest. Matty talks to Mrs. Belvin, who, in order to protect the whistleblower, confesses to the leak herself and is fired.
23	4	"Piece of My Heart"	Mike Listo	Michelle Leibel & Sarah Gertrude Shapiro	October 30, 2025	4.68
The team takes on a wrongful death case where an aging factory worker was killed in a hurricane after being forced to stay at work during the evacuation. The factory owner claims the victim was unable to respond to the evacuation alert due to extenuating factors, so Olympia tries to vilify the supervisor, who left early, only to discover his actions were due to concern over his paraplegic daughter. However, Matty proves that the victim was left alone despite knowledge he wasn't physically strong enough to survive, forcing the factory to provide the maximum settlement amount. Later, Olympia visits Matty in a panic, saying Julian found Matty's correspondence with Mrs. Belvin and now suspects Matty was involved in the leak.
24	5	"Mousetrap"	Jennifer Lynch	Sara Rose Feinberg & Edith D. Rodriguez	November 6, 2025	4.64
As Julian's suspicions of Matty leave Olympia caught between them, the team reopens the case of Daniel Pearson, who was sentenced to life at age fifteen for killing his abusive foster father, and has been granted a resentencing after his original defense lawyer was convicted of fraud. Olympia runs into trouble with the case when it's revealed that Daniel was arrested for assaulting a dancer at a strip club shortly after the murder. Matty and Julian go to the club and learn not only that the dancer in question lied, but that Daniel had undergone medical treatment before coming to the club and his rampage was caused by the medications. Hospital footage ends up revealing that Daniel was at the hospital during the time of death and his foster father simply died in a drunken accident, resulting in Daniel being set free. Matty and Olympia manage to pull off an elaborate cover story that eventually convinces Julian that Matty had no part in Mrs. Belvin's whistleblowing.
25	6	"Harm Reduction"	Gina Lamar	Conway Preston & Nicki Renna	November 13, 2025	4.48
26	7	"Prior Bad Acts"	Tessa Blake	Sheridan Watson & Katie Wech	December 4, 2025	N/A
Olympia and Matty are all set to have Senior voted out of his position, but during the meeting, Senior reveals that he has successfully negotiated a merger with a rival law firm that Jacobson Moore has coveted, and his removal will destroy that merger, forcing the other partners to keep him on. To make matters worse, Olympia's mother Celeste's boyfriend, chiropractor Lionel Carlisle, is sued by a patient who claims he was deliberately misled about the cost of a new back brace Lionel created. Celeste has privately married Lionel and now risks losing her house. While trying to defend Lionel, Olympia recalls when she first met him four years ago, when she and her mother were at odds about whether Celeste could support herself. With Senior on the warpath, Matty and Olympia plot to get Debra Palmer's NDA from his home office safe, but Matty gets upset when she learns Olympia got Julian involved. Although Olympia manages to prove Lionel had no prior knowledge of the cost change, he is still on the hook for medical fraud because he hired actors to portray patients in his commercial for the back brace and did not use disclaimers. Olympia arranges a family dinner at Senior's apartment to get the SD card with the NDA, but just as she's about to do so, Celeste interrupts and chastises her for being too critical of Lionel. Regretful, Olympia takes a closer look at Lionel's case and discovers a text chain revealing the plaintiff intentionally ignored obvious warning signs of fraud, getting the lawsuit dismissed. Olympia and Celeste make amends and the former invites the latter to bring Lionel for the holidays. Matty later gets a call from Olympia, who is ecstatic as Julian managed to get the SD card for her during the dinner.
27	8	"Call It a Christmas Gift"	Mike Listo	Damani Johnson & Katie Wech	December 11, 2025	N/A
During her second Christmas at Jacobson Moore, Matty represents Diego, a former firefighter suing the FDNY, claiming that two of his fellow firefighters sabotaged his equipment because of his homosexuality and the captain covered it up. Senior suffers a stroke and is hospitalized, which leaves Julian conflicted about his feelings towards his father. Matty's star witness suddenly recants and at first it appears the captain beat him into silence, but Matty later discovers that the witness drunkenly injured himself and recanted because the captain has a long-term illness and his medical benefits are threatened by the lawsuit. Unable to avoid sympathizing with the captain, Matty accepts defeat and allows the FDNY to win. Sarah confesses to Olympia how she took pictures of Julian's datebook for Senior; furious, Olympia fires Sarah from the team. Sarah subsequently gets a call from Billy, who reveals that Claudia miscarried. Olympia later gives Matty the genuine WellBrexa document, but Julian, having followed Olympia, witnesses this exchange and realizes he was lied to.
28	9	"Collateral"	Michele LaBrucherie	Conway Preston & Sarah Gertrude Shapiro	February 26, 2026	N/A
With Julian now aware of the deception, Olympia wants to tell him the whole truth, but Matty is dead set against it for fear that Julian will alert Senior. Meanwhile, with Jacobson Moore's merger, Billy has decided not to come back to work, and Sarah starts worrying about her own job stability. Olympia is representing Jack Alvarez, an industrialist, in an injunction he has filed, but the day the trial is to start, Jack is picked up by ICE agents who reveal he is technically an illegal immigrant as his parents had not yet received citizenship when he was born. What's more, a burglary arrest from Jack's college years renders him ineligible for asylum. Upon learning that she is likely to be made redundant without being attached to a senior executive, Sarah pleads with Olympia for a second chance, and Olympia permits her to help with Jack's case. Sarah and Matty prove the owner of the house Jack broke into never actually lived in it, which mitigates the seriousness of the charge. The prosecution offers to let Jack stay, but he will have to resign from his company and could face bankruptcy due to financial repercussions. Jack agrees to the terms as he feels it will be worth it to stay with his family. Sarah confesses to Julian about taking photos of his datebook for Senior; pleased by her honesty, he takes her on as his junior associate, allowing her to stay at Jacobson Moore. Inspired by Jack focusing more on what could go right than wrong, Matty, realizing Olympia was right, lures Julian to her Westchester home where she reveals her true identity and motives to him.
29	10	"The Greater Good"	Helen Shaver	Sara Rose Feinberg	March 5, 2026	N/A
After learning what's really been going on, Julian at first refuses to help take down his father, infuriating Matty since she was willing to work with him despite the fact that he was the one who actually hid the WellBrexa document. Thankfully, at Olympia's insistence, Julian reluctantly agrees to try and identify the two mystery companions who were with Senior and Debra Palmer at the Sydney Opera House. Meanwhile, Billy's replacement, Hunter, arrives and his friendly, upbeat personality irritates Sarah. Shae also returns to the firm and Matty convinces Olympia to work with her. The team defends Louise, a home health care worker charged with manslaughter after her disabled patient dies from taking aspirin (which was lethal due to his condition), while she left him alone. Matty suspects the patient's sister murdered him for his life insurance, but it turns out it wasn't aspirin that caused the death, but Louise's skin cream, which shares a similar compound. Julian identifies the other people at the Opera House as WellBrexa board member Keith Carlson and his former wife Dixie. Matty and Julian track Dixie to an NA meeting, where she originally accuses them of spying on her for Keith, but Julian successfully passes himself off as an addict using the true story of one of his law school friends, angering Matty further. However, Matty still manages to win her case by proving Louise couldn't have known her skin cream would be fatal for her patient. That evening, Julian comes by Matty's house again, where he has a breakdown after meeting Alfie and realizing just how much damage he caused. Julian then gives Matty a genuine apology and she forgives him. Matty manages to learn from Dixie that the board considered someone named Milton a threat, which, thanks to Shae, Julian learns is actually Milton, Massachusetts, where the lab that conducted the opioid study is located.
30	11	"Tail Lights"	Tessa Blake	Bethany Huang & Nicki Renna	March 12, 2026	N/A
Upon tracking down the lawyer who closed the lab in Milton that conducted the WellBrexa study, Matty and Julian stage a car accident in front of him so he takes Matty on as a client, allowing her to get into his office to search his records. During this, Jacobson Moore is preparing a mass lawsuit against the owner of an apartment building which collapsed, causing many fatalities and injuries, with the survivors blaming the tragedy on substandard construction. Despite tremendous efforts from Olympia, several notes contradicting the negligence claims put a damper on the case.
31	12	"The Cavalry Isn't Coming"	Jennifer Lynch	Tommy Cook & Jeffrey Lieber	April 2, 2026	N/A
32	13	"The Future Is Nigh"	Kat Coiro	Helen Childress & Michelle Leibel	April 9, 2026	N/A
33	14	"Day One"	Hanelle Culpepper	Jenny Raftery & Katie Wech	April 16, 2026	N/A
34	15	"Who Are You?"	Kat Coiro	Nicki Renna	April 23, 2026	N/A
35	16	"Matty Matlock"	Kat Coiro	Nicki Renna	April 23, 2026	N/A

== Production ==
=== Development ===
On January 31, 2023, it was announced that a remake version of Matlock was in development, and Jennie Snyder Urman signed on to write a pilot episode to be aired by CBS. Urman is expected to executive produce alongside Joanna Klein, Eric Christian Olsen, and Kathy Bates. On May 9, 2023, the Matlock remake was given a series order. The series is developed by Urman. John Will and Kat Coiro were added as executive producers. Coiro also directed the pilot. Production companies involved with the series are Sutton Street, Cloud Nine, and CBS Studios. Matlock was moved to the 2024–25 season due to strike-related production delays. It was later reported that it was a 19-episode order. On October 22, 2024, CBS renewed the series for a second season. Though set in New York City, the show is filmed at Paramount Studios in California after the pilot was shot in Toronto. On January 22, 2026, CBS renewed the series for a third season.

=== Casting ===
Upon the pilot order announcement, Bates was cast to star. Skye P. Marshall, Jason Ritter, David Del Rio, and Leah Lewis joined the main cast upon the series order announcement. On February 8, 2024, Beau Bridges was cast in a recurring capacity. On April 1, 2024, Yael Grobglas joined the cast in a recurring role. In August 2024, Andrea Londo and Piper Curda were cast in recurring capacities.

On September 8, 2024, Bates said that Matlock was to be her final role before retirement. On October 9, 2024, she walked it back, saying that "I think that they got a bit confused." On August 1, 2025, Justina Machado joined the cast in a recurring role for the second season. On October 9, 2025, it was reported that Del Rio had been fired due to a sexual assault allegation involving Lewis. On December 11, 2025, Henry Haber and Sarah Wright Olsen were cast in recurring capacities for the second season.

=== Lawsuit ===
On June 17, 2026, former Matlock story editor and writer John Lowe (Note: Not to be confused with writer and actor John Owen Lowe) filed a lawsuit against CBS Studios, showrunner Jennie Snyder Urman and executive producers Nicki Renna and Jeffrey Lieber for creating a "hostile work environment." He alleged that "racially stereotyped comments about his body and genitalia" were made toward him and other Black cast and crew members on the series. Lowe stated that he was fired in July 2025, after raising concerns about alleged racist and sexual comments made by Urman and accused the executive producers of allowing "sexually explicit and discriminatory conduct" to fester, such as late-night calls from Urman in her underwear, a perception of indentured servitude, racially offensive remarks about Juneteenth, Renna taking verbal swings at cast members and other staffers of the series, and a racially and sexually derogatory comment about guest star Eme Ikwuakor.

In September 2026, it was reported that CBS was seeking to dismiss the lawsuit, claiming that the allegations were "fabrications and outright lies".

== Broadcast ==
Matlock premiered with a sneak peek on September 22, 2024, before its timeslot premiere on October 17 on CBS. In Canada, the series airs on Global and is available to stream on StackTV. The second season premiered on October 12, 2025.

In Australia, the show premiered on Channel Ten on the November 11, 2024 and has continued to air its second season through January 2026 and also airs on Paramount+.

In Croatia, the show premiered on national HRT 1 starting with the first season on the 15th. June 2026.

== Reception ==
=== Critical response ===
The review aggregator website Rotten Tomatoes reported a 90% approval rating for the first season with an average rating of 8.25/10, based on 42 critic reviews. The website's critics consensus reads, "Case closed—this Matlock reboot is a winner thanks to the ever reliable Kathy Bates and the intriguing wrinkle it puts on the legendary series' original concept." Metacritic, which uses a weighted average, assigned a score of 73 out of 100 based on 12 critics, indicating "generally favorable" reviews.

=== Ratings ===
Viewership and ratings per season of Matlock
Season	Timeslot (ET)	Episodes	First aired		Last aired		TV season	Viewership rank	Avg. viewers (millions)	18–49 rank	Avg. 18–49 rating
Season	Timeslot (ET)	Episodes	Date	Viewers (millions)	Date	Viewers (millions)	TV season	Viewership rank	Avg. viewers (millions)	18–49 rank	Avg. 18–49 rating
1	Sunday 8:00 p.m. (1); Thursday 9:01 p.m. (2, 18); Thursday 9:00 p.m. (3–17); Thursday 10:02 p.m. (19)	19	September 22, 2024	7.74	April 17, 2025	6.15	2024–25	TBD	TBD	TBD	TBD
2	Sunday 8:30 p.m. (1); Thursday 9:01 p.m. (2–5); Thursday 9:00 p.m. (6–TBA)	16	October 12, 2025	6.58	April 23, 2026	TBD	2025–26	TBD	TBD	TBD	TBD

==== Season 1 ====
Viewership and ratings per episode of Matlock
No.	Title	Air date	Rating/share (18–49)	Viewers (millions)	DVR (18–49)	DVR viewers (millions)	Total (18–49)	Total viewers (millions)	Ref.
1	"Pilot"	September 22, 2024	0.4/4	7.74	—N/a	—N/a	—N/a	—N/a	
2	"Rome, in a Day"	October 17, 2024	0.4/4	6.38	0.2	3.89	0.6	10.24	
3	"A Guy Named Greg"	October 24, 2024	0.4/4	6.48	0.2	3.85	0.6	10.31	
4	"The Rabbit and the Hawk"	October 31, 2024	0.4/5	6.54	0.2	3.70	0.7	10.24	
5	"Claws"	November 7, 2024	0.3/4	5.98	0.3	4.05	0.6	10.03	
6	"Sixteen Steps"	November 14, 2024	0.4/3	6.12	0.2	3.86	0.6	9.98	
7	"Belly of the Beast"	December 5, 2024	0.4/4	6.32	0.2	3.74	0.6	10.07	
8	"No, No Monsters"	December 12, 2024	0.3/4	6.20	0.2	3.51	0.6	9.71	
9	"Friends"	January 30, 2025	0.3/5	5.78	0.2	3.86	0.5	9.64	
10	"Crash Helmets On"	February 6, 2025	0.4/5	6.25	0.2	3.38	0.6	9.63	
11	"A Traitor in Thine Own House"	February 13, 2025	0.3/4	5.75	0.2	3.47	0.5	9.22	
12	"This is That Moment"	February 20, 2025	0.3/3	5.88	0.2	3.34	0.5	9.22	
13	"Pregame"	February 27, 2025	0.4/5	5.77	0.2	3.32	0.5	9.09	
14	"Game Day"	March 6, 2025	0.4/6	6.14	0.2	3.19	0.6	9.33	
15	"Game Face"	March 13, 2025	0.3/4	5.81	0.2	3.27	0.5	9.09	
16	"The Johnson Case"	April 3, 2025	0.4/5	5.64	0.2	3.50	0.6	9.14	
17	"I Was That, Too"	April 10, 2025	0.3/5	5.91	0.2	3.26	0.5	9.16	
18	"Tricks of the Trade - Part One"	April 17, 2025	0.5/8	6.15	0.2	3.16	0.7	9.31	
19	"Tricks of the Trade - Part Two"	April 17, 2025	0.5/8	6.15	0.2	3.16	0.7	9.31	

==== Season 2 ====
Viewership and ratings per episode of Matlock
No.	Title	Air date	Rating/share (18–49)	Viewers (millions)	DVR (18–49)	DVR viewers (millions)	Total (18–49)	Total viewers (millions)	Ref.
1	"The Before Times"	October 12, 2025	0.5/5	6.58	0.2	2.76	0.7	9.34	
2	"Another Matlock"	October 16, 2025	0.2/2	4.20	0.2	2.92	0.4	7.12	
3	"Tomorrow is Still Tomorrow"	October 23, 2025	0.2/3	4.44	0.2	2.75	0.4	7.19	
4	"Piece of My Heart"	October 30, 2025	0.2/2	4.68	0.2	2.49	0.4	7.17	
5	"Mousetrap"	November 6, 2025	0.3/4	4.64	0.1	2.20	0.4	6.84	
6	"Harm Reduction"	November 13, 2025	0.3/3	4.48	TBD	TBD	TBD	TBD	

=== Accolades ===
Award	Date of ceremony	Category	Nominee(s)	Result	Ref.
AARP Movies for Grownups Awards	January 10, 2026	Best Actress, Television	Kathy Bates	Won	
Astra TV Awards	June 10, 2025	Best Drama Series	Matlock	Nominated	
Astra TV Awards	June 10, 2025	Best Actress in a Drama Series	Kathy Bates	Won	
Astra TV Awards	June 10, 2025	Best Supporting Actor in a Drama Series	Jason Ritter	Nominated	
Astra TV Awards	June 10, 2025	Best Supporting Actress in a Drama Series	Skye P. Marshall	Nominated	
Astra TV Awards	June 10, 2025	Best Directing in a Drama Series	Hanelle Culpepper (for "I Was That, Too")	Nominated	
Astra TV Awards	June 10, 2025	Best Writing in a Drama Series	Jennie Snyder Urman (for "Pilot")	Nominated	
Astra TV Awards	June 10, 2025	Best Cast Ensemble in a Broadcast Network Drama Series	Matlock	Won	
Astra TV Awards	August 15, 2026	Best Actress in a Drama Series	Kathy Bates	Pending	
Astra TV Awards	August 15, 2026	Best Supporting Actor in a Drama Series	Jason Ritter	Pending	
Astra TV Awards	August 15, 2026	Best Cast Ensemble in a Broadcast Network Drama Series	Matlock	Pending	
Critics' Choice Television Awards	February 7, 2025	Best Actress in a Drama Series	Kathy Bates	Won	
Critics' Choice Television Awards	February 7, 2025	Best Supporting Actress in a Drama Series	Skye P. Marshall	Nominated	
Critics' Choice Television Awards	January 4, 2026	Best Actress in a Drama Series	Kathy Bates	Nominated	
Critics' Choice Television Awards	January 4, 2026	Best Supporting Actress in a Drama Series	Skye P. Marshall	Nominated	
Golden Globe Awards	January 5, 2025	Best Actress in a Television Series – Drama	Kathy Bates	Nominated	
Golden Globe Awards	January 11, 2026	Best Actress in a Television Series – Drama	Kathy Bates	Nominated	
Gotham TV Awards	June 2, 2025	Breakthrough Drama Series	Matlock	Nominated	
Gotham TV Awards	June 2, 2025	Outstanding Lead Performance in a Drama Series	Kathy Bates	Won	
Gotham TV Awards	June 2, 2025	Outstanding Supporting Performance in a Drama Series	Skye P. Marshall	Nominated	
Primetime Emmy Awards	September 14, 2025	Outstanding Lead Actress in a Drama Series	Kathy Bates	Nominated	
Satellite Awards	January 26, 2025	Best Actress in a Drama or Genre Series	Kathy Bates	Won	
Satellite Awards	January 26, 2025	Best Drama Series	Matlock	Nominated	
Screen Actors Guild Awards	February 23, 2025	Outstanding Performance by a Female Actor in a Drama Series	Kathy Bates	Nominated	
Television Critics Association Awards	August 20, 2025	Individual Achievement in Drama	Kathy Bates	Nominated	
Television Critics Association Awards	August 20, 2025	Outstanding Achievement in Drama	Matlock	Nominated	
Television Critics Association Awards	August 20, 2025	Outstanding New Program	Matlock	Nominated	
