= Critics' Choice Television Award for Best Supporting Actress in a Drama Series =

Award category presented by the Critics' Choice Television Awards (BTJA)

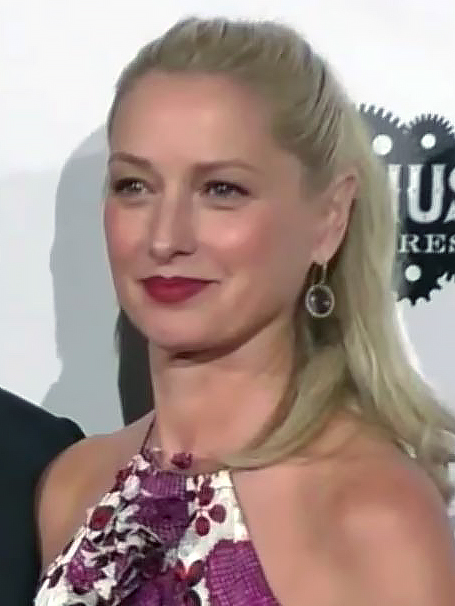
- Country: United States
- Presented by: Critics Choice Association
- First award: 2011
- Currently held by: Katherine LaNasa – The Pitt (2026)
- Website: criticschoice.com

The Critics' Choice Television Award for Best Supporting Actress in a Drama Series is one of the award categories presented annually by the Critics' Choice Television Awards (BTJA) to recognize the work done by television actresses.

It was introduced in 2011, when the event was first initiated. The winners are selected by a group of television critics that are part of the Broadcast Television Critics Association.

Christina Hendricks and Thandiwe Newton both hold the record for most wins in this category with two each.

== Winners and nominees ==
indicates the winner

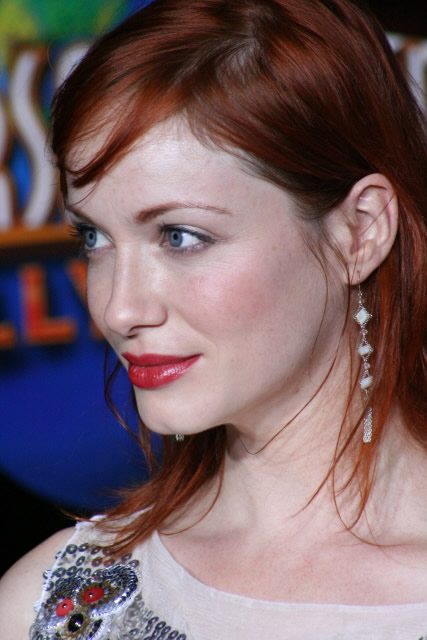
Christina Hendricks won twice consecutively for Mad Men (2011, 2012).

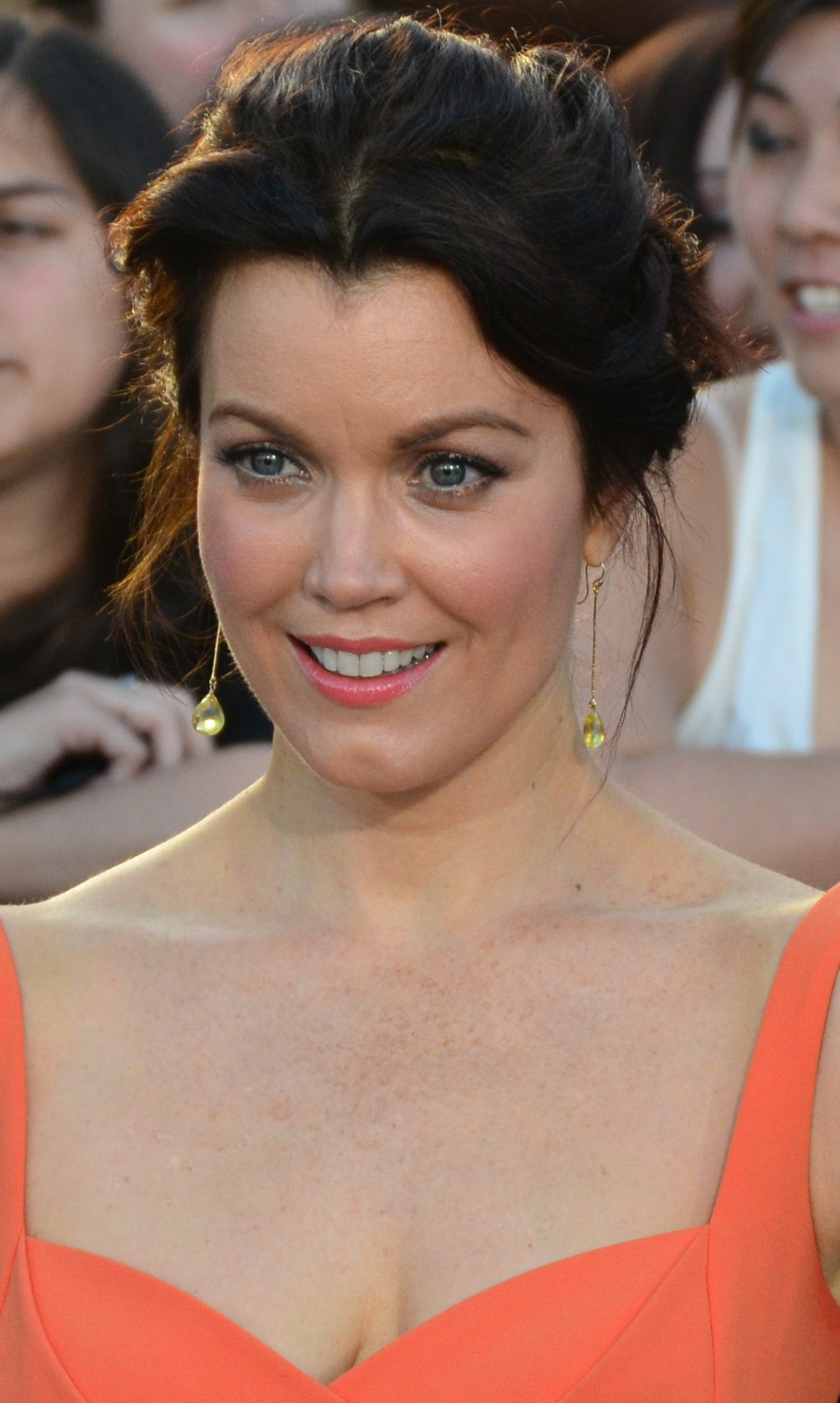
Bellamy Young won for Scandal (2014).

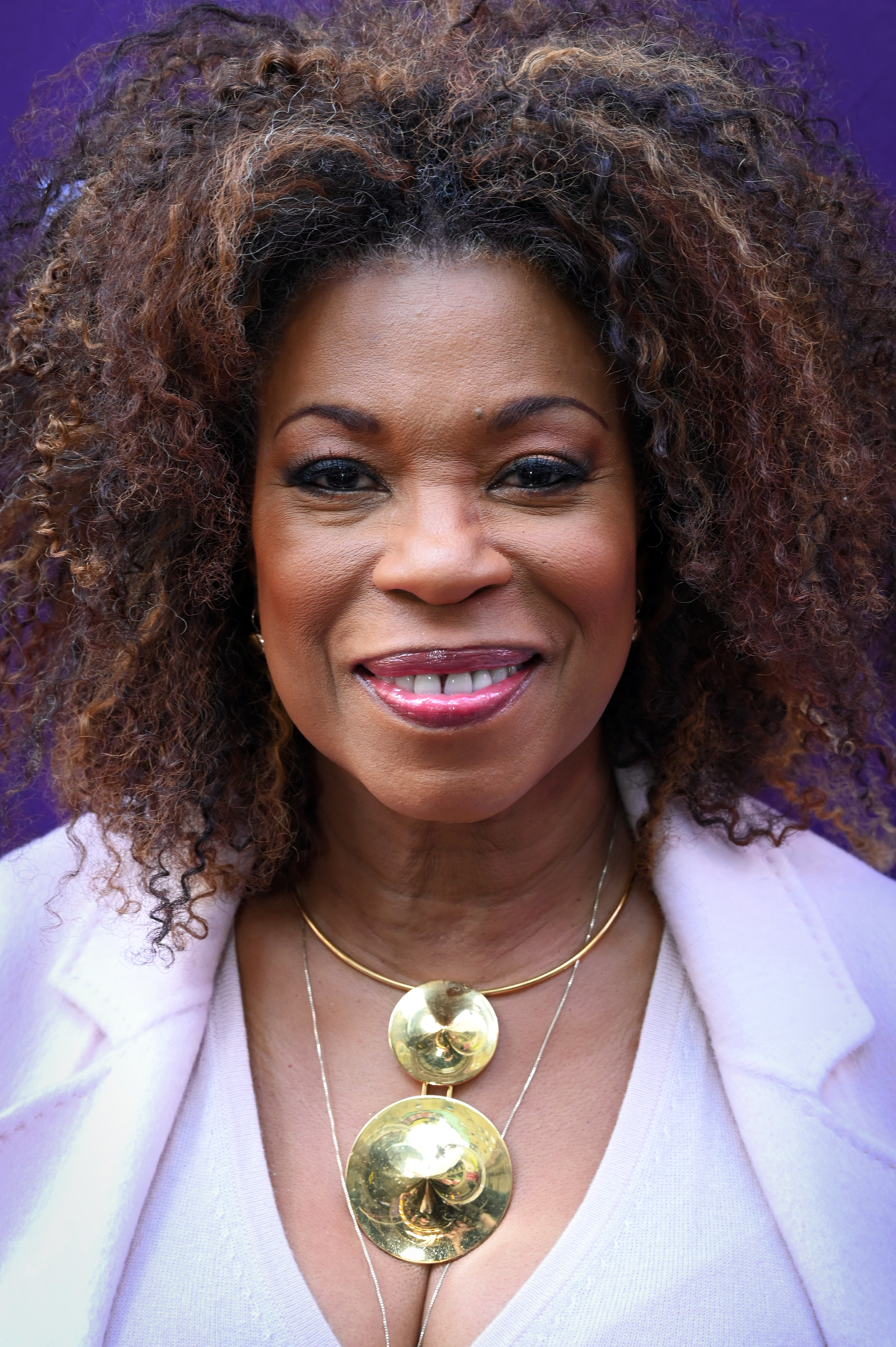
Lorraine Toussaint won for Orange is the New Black (2015).

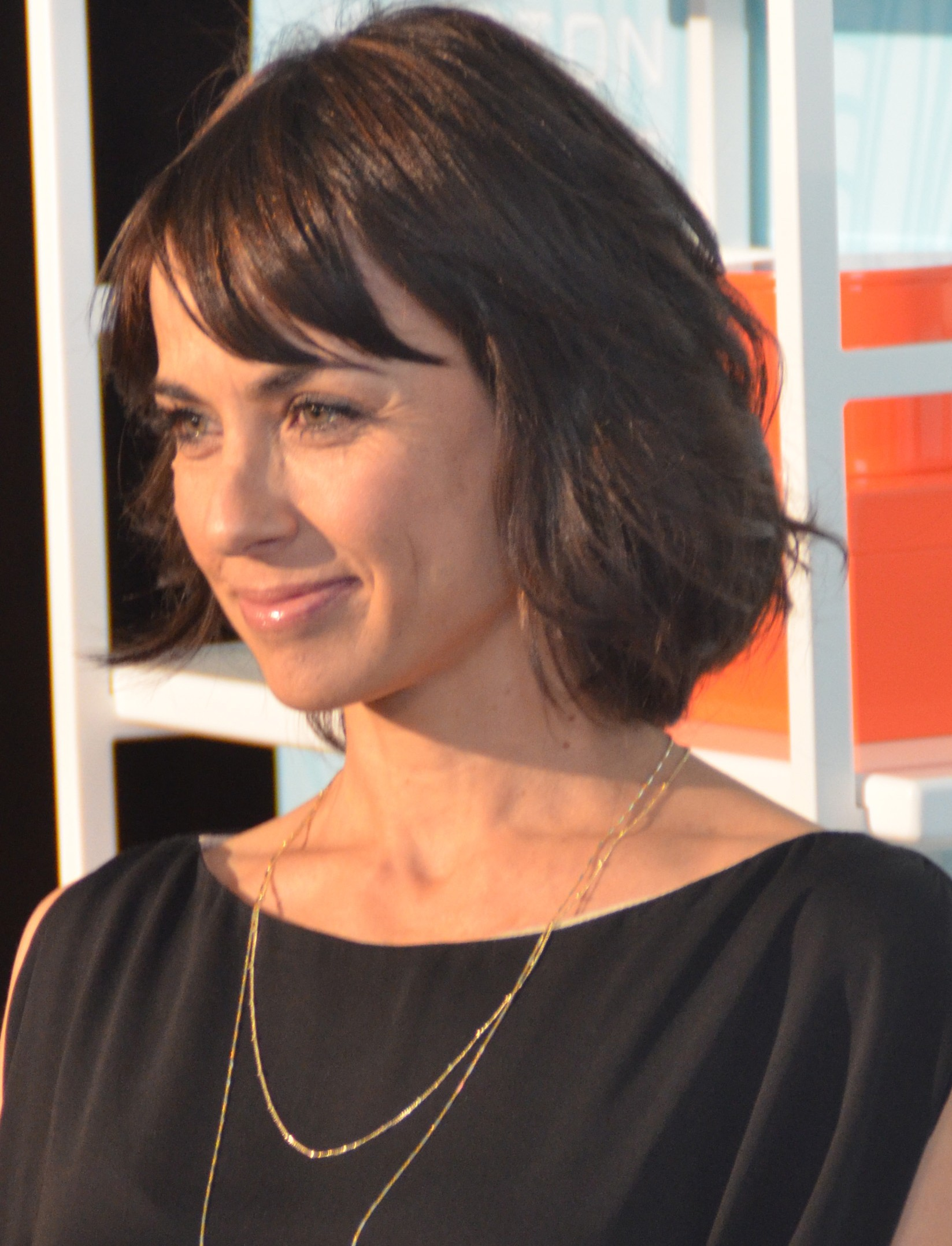
Constance Zimmer won for UnReal (2016).

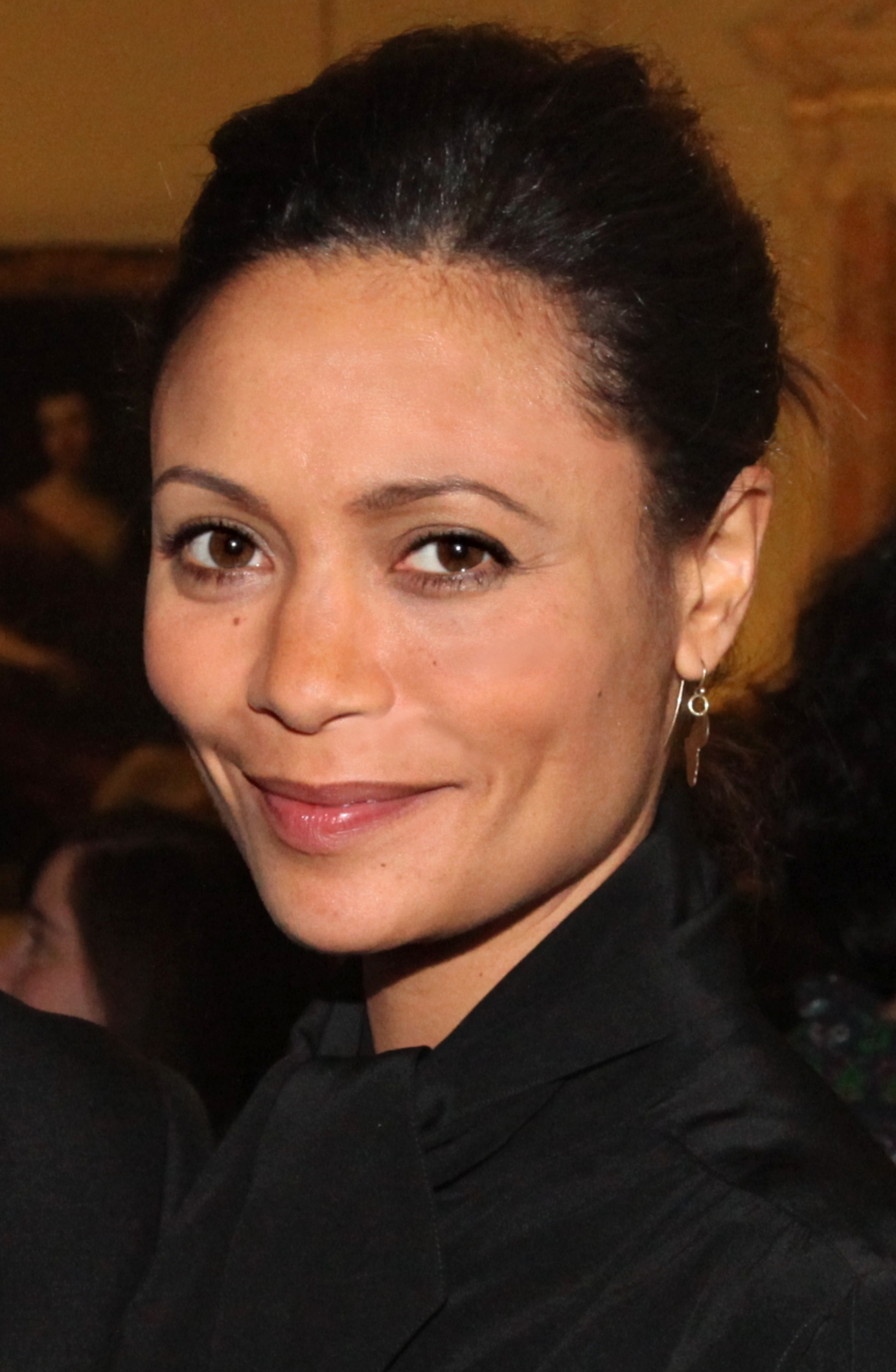
Thandie Newton won twice for Westworld (2016, 2019).

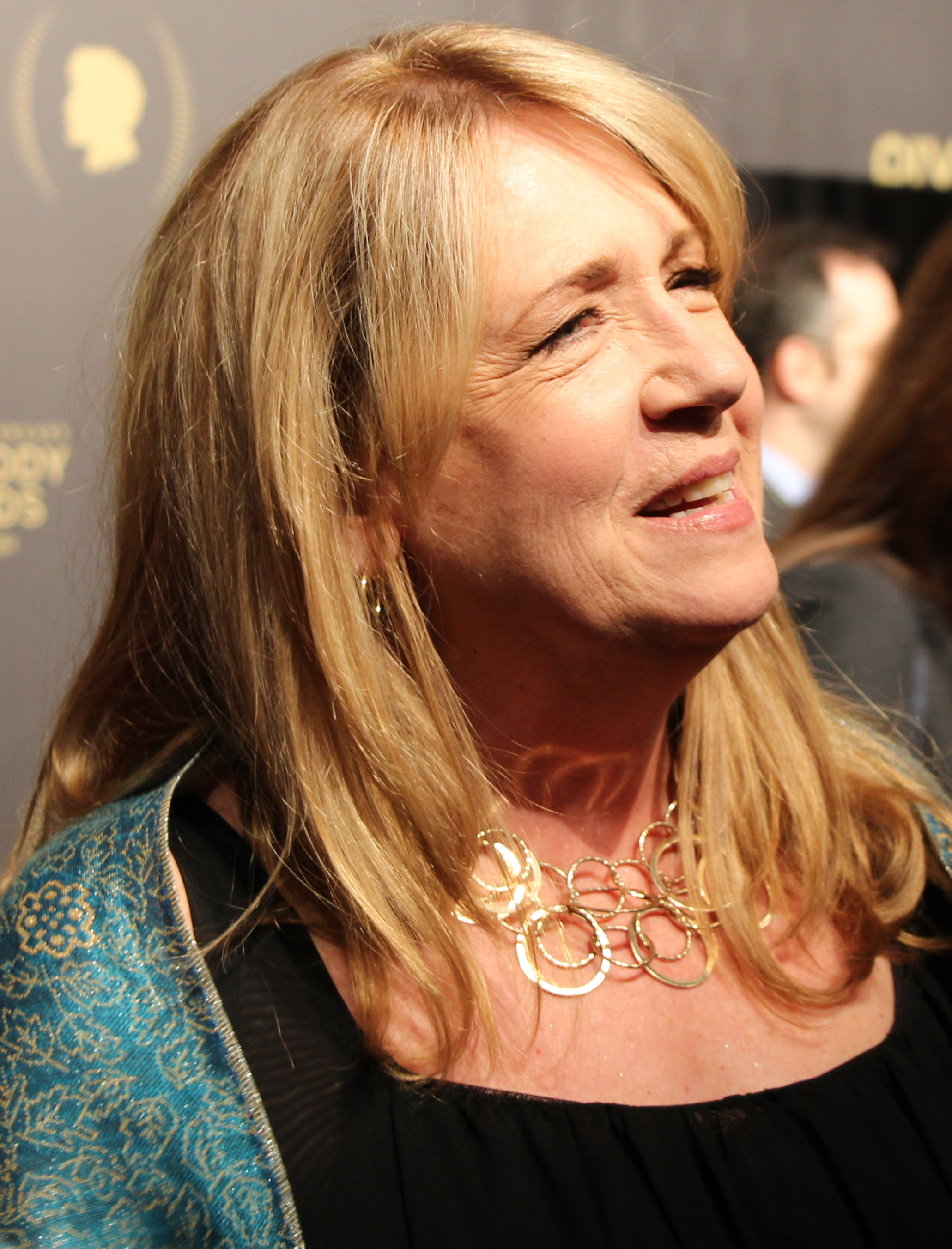
Ann Dowd won for The Handmaid's Tale (2018).

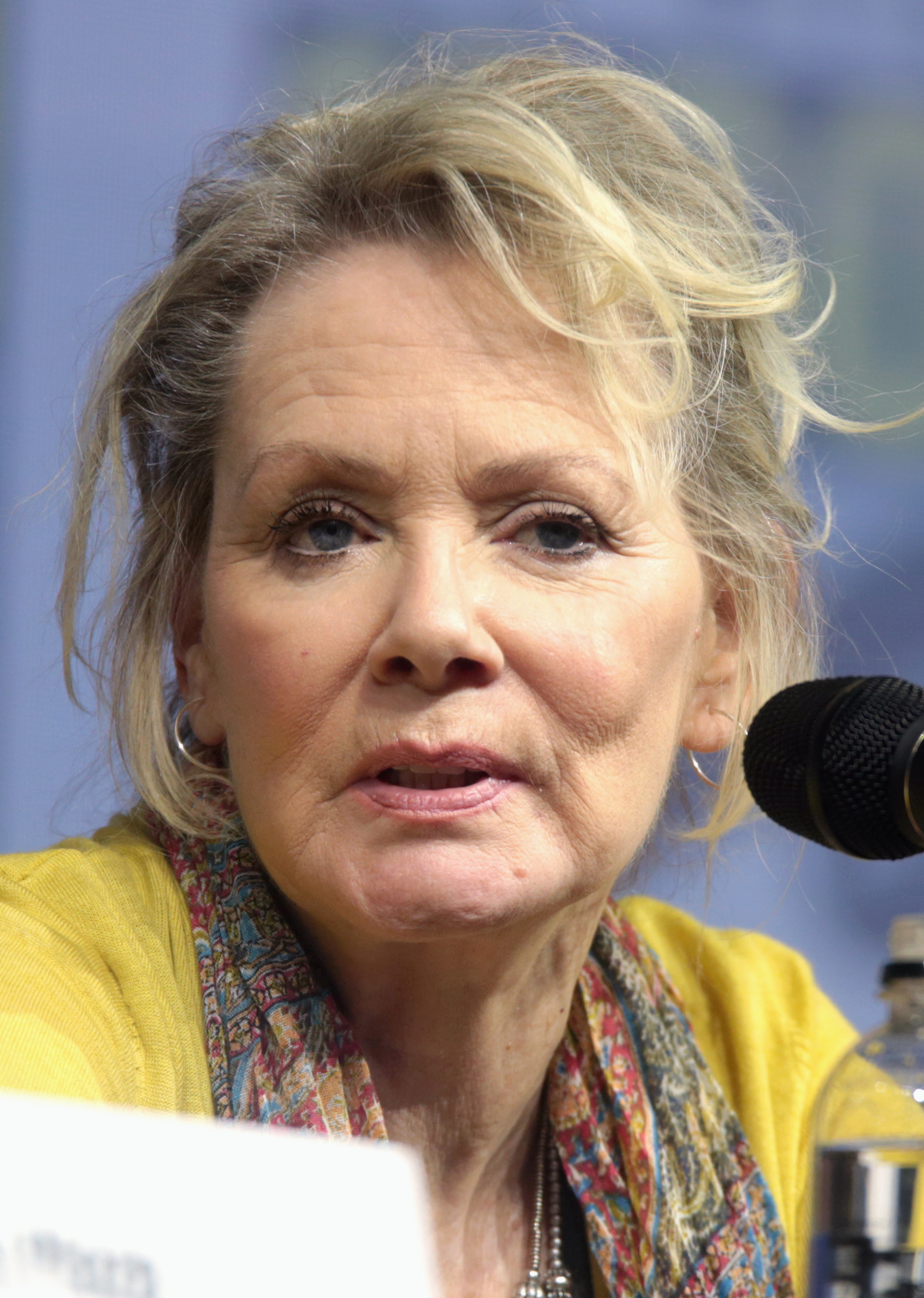
Jean Smart won for Watchmen (2020).

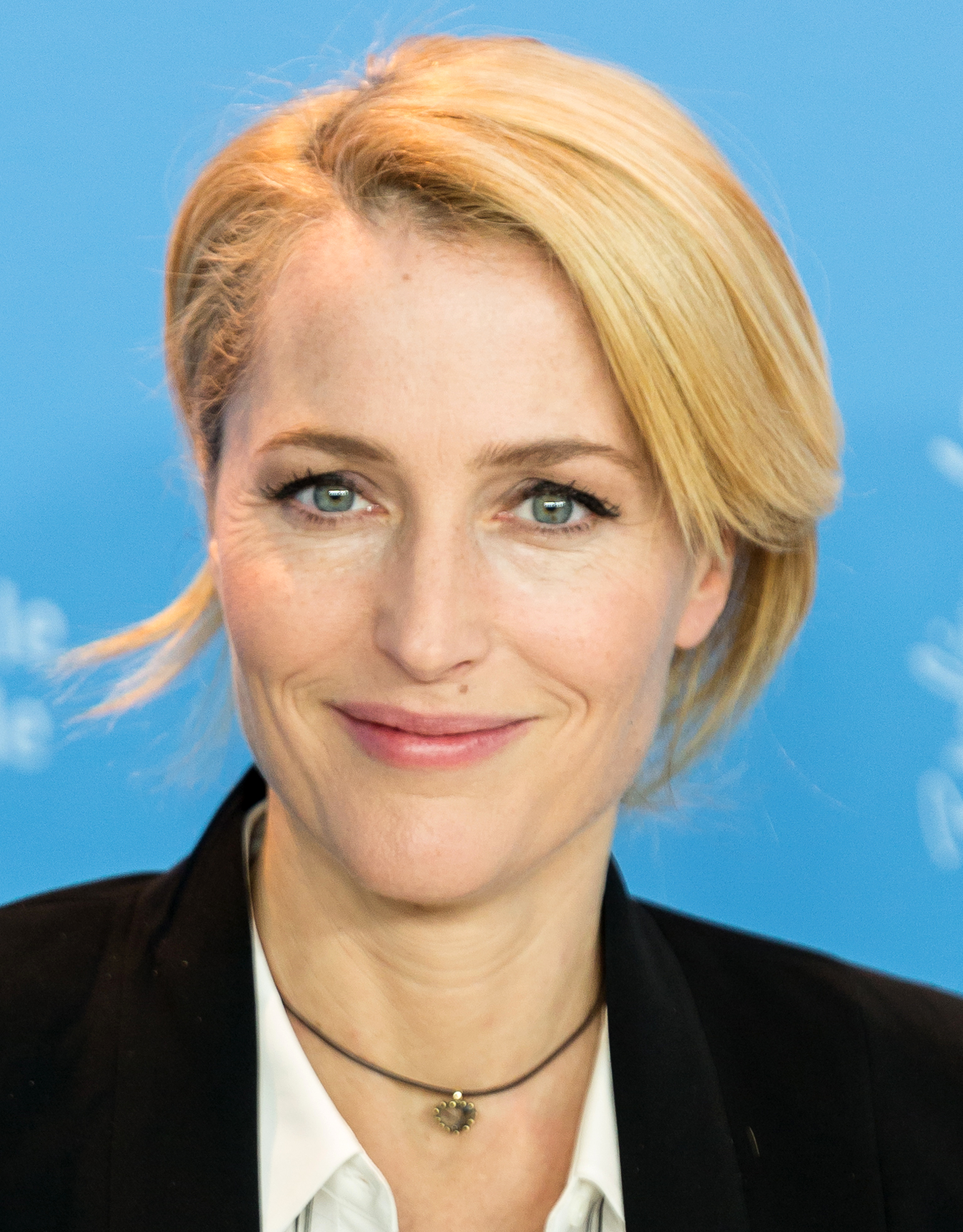
Gillian Anderson won for The Crown (2021).

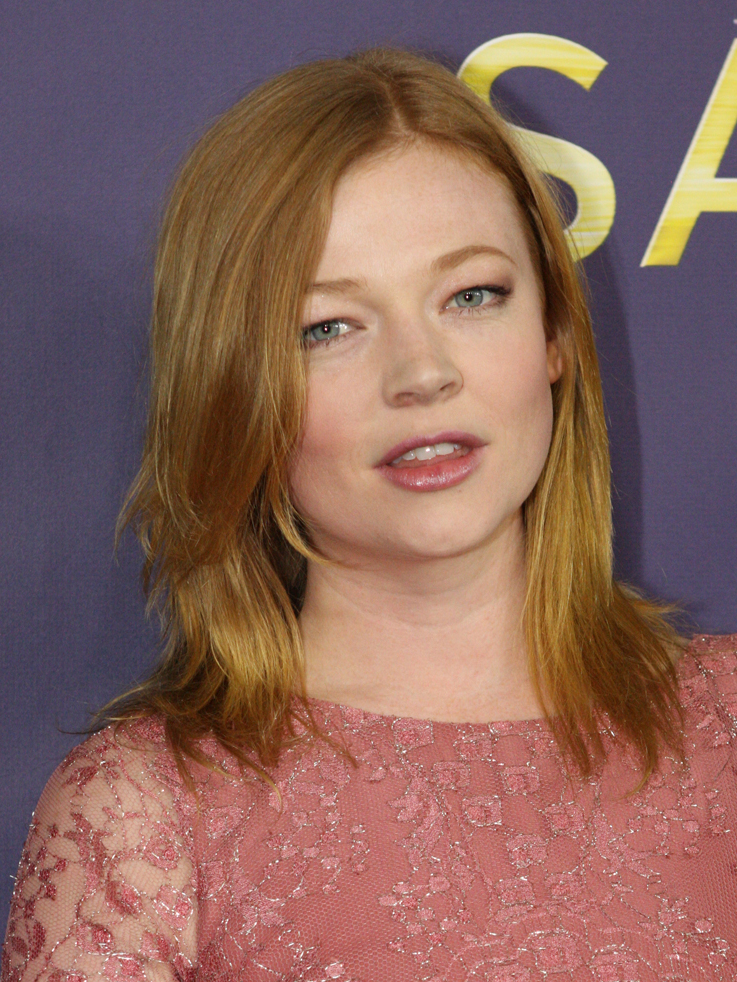
Sarah Snook won for Succession (2022)

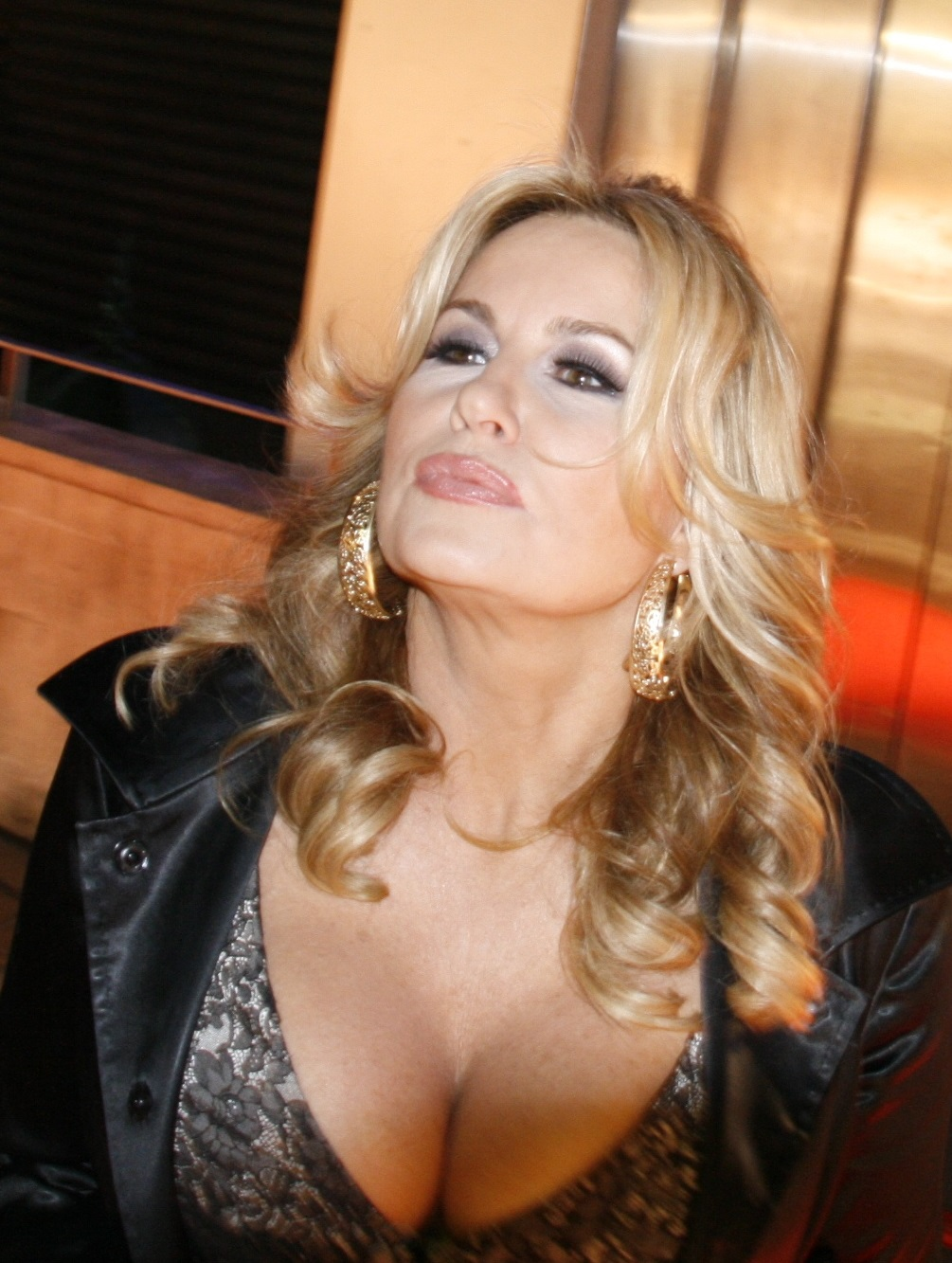
Jennifer Coolidge won for The White Lotus (2023).

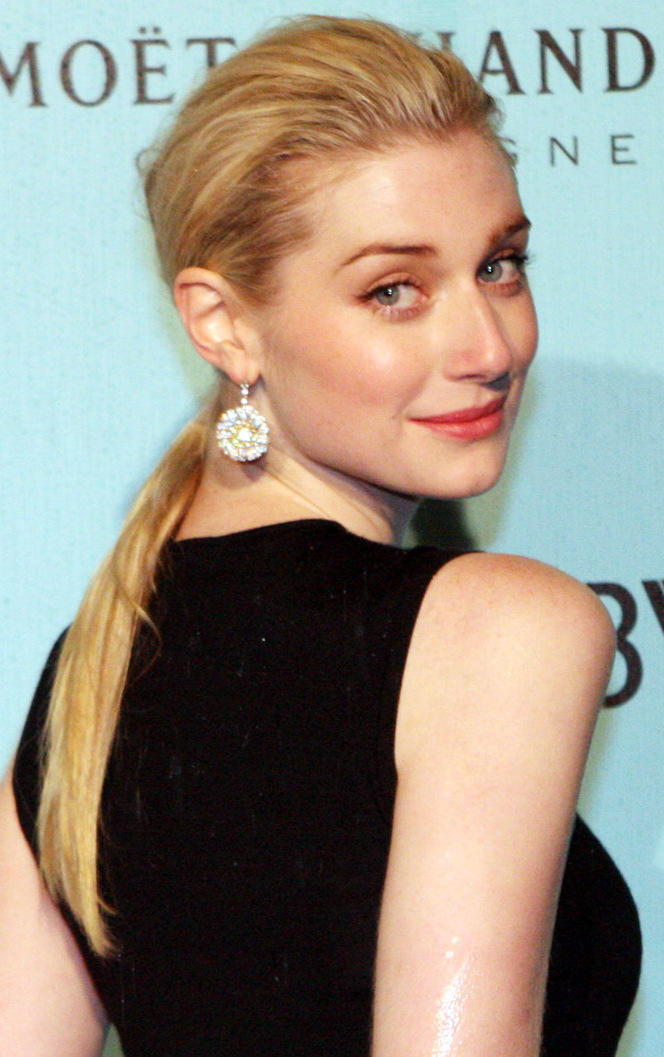
Elizabeth Debicki won for The Crown (2024).

=== 2010s ===
Year	Actress	Program	Role	Network
2011	Christina Hendricks	Mad Men	Joan Holloway	AMC
2011	Margo Martindale	Justified	Mags Bennett	FX
2011	Michelle Forbes	The Killing	Mitch Larsen	AMC
2011	Kelly Macdonald	Boardwalk Empire	Margaret Thompson	HBO
2011	Archie Panjabi	The Good Wife	Kalinda Sharma	CBS
2011	Chloë Sevigny	Big Love	Nicolette Grant	HBO
2012	Christina Hendricks	Mad Men	Joan Holloway	AMC
2012	Christine Baranski	The Good Wife	Diane Lockhart	CBS
2012	Anna Gunn	Breaking Bad	Skyler White	AMC
2012	Regina King	Southland	Det. Lydia Adams	TNT
2012	Kelly Macdonald	Boardwalk Empire	Margaret Thompson	HBO
2012	Maggie Siff	Sons of Anarchy	Tara Knowles	FX
2013	Monica Potter	Parenthood	Kristina Braverman	NBC
2013	Jennifer Carpenter	Dexter	Debra Morgan	Showtime
2013	Emilia Clarke	Game of Thrones	Daenerys Targaryen	HBO
2013	Anna Gunn	Breaking Bad	Skylar White	AMC
2013	Regina King	Southland	Det. Lydia Adams	TNT
2013	Abigail Spencer	Rectify	Amantha Holden	Sundance TV
2014	Bellamy Young	Scandal	First Lady Melody "Mellie" Grant	ABC
2014	Christine Baranski	The Good Wife	Diane Lockhart	CBS
2014	Anna Gunn	Breaking Bad	Skyler White	AMC
2014	Annet Mahendru	The Americans	Nina Sergeevna Krilova	FX
2014	Melissa McBride	The Walking Dead	Carol Peletier	AMC
2014	Maggie Siff	Sons of Anarchy	Tara Knowles	FX
2015	Lorraine Toussaint	Yvonne "Vee" Parker	Orange Is the New Black	Netflix
2015	Christine Baranski	The Good Wife	Diane Lockhart	CBS
2015	Joelle Carter	Justified	Ava Crowder	FX
2015	Carrie Coon	The Leftovers	Nora Durst	HBO
2015	Mae Whitman	Parenthood	Amber Holt	NBC
2015	Katheryn Winnick	Vikings	Lagertha	History
2016 (1)	Constance Zimmer	UnREAL	Quinn King	Lifetime
2016 (1)	Ann Dowd	The Leftovers	Patti Levin	HBO
2016 (1)	Regina King	The Leftovers	Erika Murphy	HBO
2016 (1)	Helen McCrory	Penny Dreadful	Evelyn Poole	Showtime
2016 (1)	Hayden Panettiere	Nashville	Juliette Barnes	ABC
2016 (1)	Maura Tierney	The Affair	Helen Solloway	Showtime
2016 (2)	Thandiwe Newton	Westworld	Maeve Millay	HBO
2016 (2)	Christine Baranski	The Good Wife	Diane Lockhart	CBS
2016 (2)	Emilia Clarke	Game of Thrones	Daenerys Targaryen	HBO
2016 (2)	Lena Headey	Game of Thrones	Cersei Lannister	HBO
2016 (2)	Maura Tierney	The Affair	Helen Solloway	Showtime
2016 (2)	Constance Zimmer	UnREAL	Quinn King	Lifetime
2018	Ann Dowd	The Handmaid's Tale	Aunt Lydia	Hulu
2018	Gillian Anderson	American Gods	Media	Starz
2018	Emilia Clarke	Game of Thrones	Daenerys Targaryen	HBO
2018	Cush Jumbo	The Good Fight	Lucca Quinn	CBS All Access
2018	Margo Martindale	Sneaky Pete	Audrey Bernhardt	Amazon Prime Video
2018	Chrissy Metz	This Is Us	Kate Pearson	NBC
2019	Thandiwe Newton	Westworld	Maeve Millay	HBO
2019	Julia Garner	Ozark	Ruth Langmore	Netflix
2019	Rhea Seehorn	Better Call Saul	Kim Wexler	AMC
2019	Dina Shihabi	Jack Ryan	Hanin Ali	Amazon Prime Video
2019	Yvonne Strahovski	The Handmaid's Tale	Serena Joy	Hulu
2019	Holly Taylor	The Americans	Paige Jennings	FX

=== 2020s ===
Year	Actress	Program	Role	Network
2020	Jean Smart	Watchmen	Laurie Blake	HBO
2020	Helena Bonham Carter	The Crown	Princess Margaret, Countess of Snowdon	Netflix
2020	Gwendoline Christie	Game of Thrones	Brienne of Tarth	HBO
2020	Laura Dern	Big Little Lies	Renata Klein	HBO
2020	Audra McDonald	The Good Fight	Liz Lawrence	CBS All Access
2020	Meryl Streep	Big Little Lies	Mary Louise Wright	HBO
2020	Susan Kelechi Watson	This Is Us	Beth (Clarke) Pearson	NBC
2021	Gillian Anderson	The Crown	Margaret Thatcher	Netflix
2021	Cynthia Erivo	The Outsider	Holly Gibney	HBO
2021	Julia Garner	Ozark	Ruth Langmore	Netflix
2021	Janet McTeer	Ozark	Helen Pierce	Netflix
2021	Wunmi Mosaku	Lovecraft Country	Ruby Baptiste	HBO
2021	Rhea Seehorn	Better Call Saul	Kim Wexler	AMC
2022	Sarah Snook	Succession	Shiv Roy	HBO
2022	Christine Lahti	Evil	Sheryl Luria	CBS / Paramount+
2022	Andrea Martin	Evil	Sister Andrea	CBS / Paramount+
2022	Audra McDonald	The Good Fight	Liz Lawrence	CBS / Paramount+
2022	J. Smith-Cameron	Succession	Gerri Kellman	HBO
2022	Susan Kelechi Watson	This Is Us	Beth Pearson	NBC
2023
2023	Jennifer Coolidge	The White Lotus: Sicily	Tanya McQuoid-Hunt	HBO
2023	Milly Alcock	House of the Dragon	Young Rhaenyra Targaryen	HBO
2023	Carol Burnett	Better Call Saul	Marion	AMC
2023	Julia Garner	Ozark	Ruth Langmore	Netflix
2023	Audra McDonald	The Good Fight	Liz Reddick	Paramount+
2023	Rhea Seehorn	Better Call Saul	Kim Wexler	AMC
2024
2024	Elizabeth Debicki	The Crown	Diana, Princess of Wales	Netflix
2024	Nicole Beharie	The Morning Show	Christine Hunter	Apple TV+
2024	Sophia Di Martino	Loki	Sylvie	Disney+
2024	Celia Rose Gooding	Star Trek: Strange New Worlds	Nyota Uhura	Paramount+
2024	Karen Pittman	The Morning Show	Mia Jordan	Apple TV+
2024	Christina Ricci	Yellowjackets	Misty Quigley	Showtime
2025
2025	Moeka Hoshi	Shōgun	Usami Fuji	FX / Hulu
2025	Allison Janney	The Diplomat	Grace Penn	Netflix
2025	Nicole Kidman	Lioness	Kaitlyn Meade	Paramount+
2025	Skye P. Marshall	Matlock	Olympia Lawrence	CBS
2025	Anna Sawai	Pachinko	Naomi Ichizaki	Apple TV+
2025	Fiona Shaw	Bad Sisters	Angelica Muldoon	Apple TV+
2026
2026	Katherine LaNasa	The Pitt	Dana Evans	HBO Max
2026	Nicole Beharie	The Morning Show	Christine Hunter	Apple TV+
2026	Denée Benton	The Gilded Age	Peggy Scott	HBO Max
2026	Allison Janney	The Diplomat	Grace Hagen Penn	Netflix
2026	Greta Lee	The Morning Show	Stella Bak	Apple TV
2026	Skye P. Marshall	Matlock	Olympia Lawrence	CBS

== Multiple wins ==
2 wins

- Christina Hendricks (consecutive)
- Thandiwe Newton

== Multiple nominations ==
4 nominations

- Christine Baranski

3 nominations

- Emilia Clarke
- Julia Garner
- Anna Gunn
- Regina King
- Audra McDonald
- Rhea Seehorn

2 nominations

- Gillian Anderson
- Nicole Beharie
- Ann Dowd
- Christina Hendricks
- Allison Janney
- Kelly Macdonald
- Skye P. Marshall
- Margo Martindale
- Thandiwe Newton
- Maggie Siff
- Maura Tierney
- Susan Kelechi Watson
- Constance Zimmer

== See also ==
- TCA Award for Individual Achievement in Drama
- Primetime Emmy Award for Outstanding Supporting Actress in a Drama Series
- Golden Globe Award for Best Supporting Actress – Series, Miniseries or Television Film
