= Coup! =

2023 film by Austin Stark

- Theatrical release poster
- Directed by: Austin Stark; Joseph Schuman
- Written by: Austin Stark; Joseph Schuman
- Produced by: Brian Levy; Harris Gurny; Warner Davis; Molly Conners; Amanda Bowers; Jane Sinisi
- Starring: Peter Sarsgaard; Billy Magnussen; Sarah Gadon; Skye P. Marshall; Faran Tahir; Kristine Nielsen; Fisher Stevens
- Cinematography: Conor Murphy
- Edited by: Harrison Atkins; Alan Canant
- Music by: Nathan Halpern
- Production companies: Entertainment 360; Phiphen Pictures; Hemlock Circle; Coup! Media
- Distributed by: Greenwich Entertainment
- Release dates: September 8, 2023 (Venice); August 2, 2024 (United States)
- Running time: 98 minutes
- Country: United States
- Language: English
- Box office: $275,966

Coup! is a 2023 American dark comedy film written and directed by Austin Stark and Joseph Schuman. It stars Peter Sarsgaard, Billy Magnussen, Sarah Gadon, Skye P. Marshall, Faran Tahir, Kristine Nielsen, and Fisher Stevens. Sarsgaard and Magnussen also served as executive producers of the film. It is the first collaboration between writer-director team Austin Stark and Joseph Schuman. Set during the 1918 flu pandemic, the film follows a rebellious servant who leads a revolt against his wealthy employer.

Coup! premiered in the Giornate degli Autori section of the 80th Venice International Film Festival on 8 September 2023. The film had a wide release in the United States on August 2, 2024, by Greenwich Entertainment.

== Plot ==
Isolated on an island mansion during the First World War and the 1918 influenza epidemic, a rich, famous, and overly entitled Progressive journalist from America's White Anglo-Saxon Protestant elite (Billy Magnussen) and his socialite wife (Sarah Gadon) hire a mysterious and Southern-accented grifter (Peter Sarsgaard) as the household's cook. The cook first challenges his orders to prepare only vegetarian meals for his employers and fellow servants. When the epidemic also descends on the island and their meatless food supplies become hard to replace, the wily cook rouses the servants to insurrection and takes over the mansion. The flabbergasted journalist suspects the cook of a more sinister agenda, and the mind games between master and servant escalate into class warfare.

== Cast ==
- Peter Sarsgaard as Floyd Monk
- Billy Magnussen as Jay “J.C.” Horton
- Sarah Gadon as Julie Horton
- Skye P. Marshall as Mrs. Tidwell
- Faran Tahir as Kaan
- Kristine Nielsen as Ms. Catherine McMurray
- Fisher Stevens as Upton Sinclair
- Callum Vinson as Tom
- Willa Dunn as Molly

== Production ==
In November 2022, it was announced that Sarsgaard, Magnussen, Gadon, Marshall, Tahir, Nielsen and Stevens would appear in the film.

In February 2023, it was announced that principal photography wrapped in New Jersey.

== Release ==
Coup! premiered in the 'Giornate degli Autori' section of the Venice Film Festival on September 8th 2023. It was subsequently screened at various film festivals, including the Glasgow Film Festival, Moscow International Film Festival, Santa Barbara International Film Festival, Filmfest Hamburg, and São Paulo International Film Festival.

In February 2024, it was announced that Greenwich Entertainment would distribute Coup! in North America. The film had a theatrical release in the United States on August 2, 2024.

== Reception ==
On the review aggregator website Rotten Tomatoes, 80% of 44 critics' reviews are positive, with an average rating of 6.7/10. The website's consensus reads: “A satire that keeps its knives sharpened, Coup! is a satisfying and swift meal served up with a sly Peter Sarsgaard performance as a garnish.” Metacritic, which uses a weighted average, assigned the film a score of 61 out of 100, based on 10 critics, indicating "generally favorable" reviews.

In his review for Variety, Guy Lodge described the film as "fleet and frisky at just 97 minutes, tidily but not ostentatiously crafted, and in thrall to the pleasurably low-stakes sport of watching one scoundrel outwit another."

Leslie Felperin, in her review for The Hollywood Reporter, praised Peter Sarsgaard's performance and the movie: "Although Coup! has a small cast and unfolds mostly in a secluded mansion during the 1918 influenza pandemic, it packs a lot of flavor, suspense and droll comedy into its slim 97-minute running time."

Xan Brooks of The Guardian wrote about the film: "It is bright and assured and thoroughly enjoyable in the moment, even if its line of satire feels glib and its anger ever so slightly concocted."
