= Miami Medical =

- Genre: Medical drama
- Created by: Jeffrey Lieber
- Starring: Jeremy Northam; Lana Parrilla; Mike Vogel; Elisabeth Harnois; Omar Gooding
- Opening theme: "19th Nervous Breakdown" by The Rolling Stones
- Country of origin: United States
- Original language: English
- No. of seasons: 1
- No. of episodes: 13

Production
- Executive producers: Jerry Bruckheimer; Jeffrey Lieber; Jonathan Littman; Steve Maeda
- Running time: 45 minutes
- Production companies: Jerry Bruckheimer Television; Skim Milk Productions; Bonanza Productions; Warner Bros. Television

Original release
- Network: CBS
- Release: April 2 – July 2, 2010

Miami Medical (formerly titled Miami Trauma) is an American medical drama television series that aired on CBS from April 2 to July 2, 2010. It follows the professional and private lives of a team of trauma surgeons.

The series was created by Jeffrey Lieber and produced by Jerry Bruckheimer Television and Warner Bros. Television.

On May 18, 2010, CBS cancelled the series after one season.

== Cast and characters ==
Matthew Procter, MD, FACS (Jeremy Northam)

Matthew moved to Miami following a successful stint as a GI doctor in Maryland. His transfer was prompted by an accident that caused him to reconsider his life. He was unexpectedly appointed to the position of Chief of Trauma Team Alpha over veteran surgeon Eva Zambrano. He is an Attending Trauma Physician.

Eva Zambrano, MD, FACS (Lana Parrilla)

Eva is an Attending Trauma Physician and the Deputy Chief of Trauma Team Alpha. Her father was a trauma surgeon in Cuba, but when they defected on a raft when Zambrano was six, his ego would not allow him to begin his career again as a resident. Despite being next-in-line to run Alpha Team, she is unexpectedly pitted-to-the-post by Procter.

Chris Deleo, MD, FACS (Mike Vogel)

Chris, known as "C" to his colleagues, is three-years Eva's junior, though still felt he was a viable candidate for the vacant Chief position. During season one, he had been a member of Alpha for two-and-a-half years. He is Chief Resident.

Serena Warren, MD (Elisabeth Harnois)

Serena is a resident assigned to the trauma surgery service, and as such is far more idealistic than her older colleagues. Warren often exhibits an inability to deliver bad news to patients. She is incredibly claustrophobic.

Tuck Brody, RN (Omar Gooding)

Tuck is a Nurse assigned to Trauma. He is often seen giving emotional and moral support to patients, families, and doctors. During season one, Tuck is stabbed, though he later makes a full recovery.

== Episodes ==
No.	Title	Directed by	Written by	Original release date	Prod. code
1	"Pilot"	Kenneth Fink	Jeffrey Lieber	April 2, 2010	2J5241
The team is aided by a new surgeon; a restaurant explosion sends many victims to the hospital.
2	"88 Seconds"	Paul McCrane	Steven Maeda	April 9, 2010	2J5201
A member of the team learns a secret about Dr. Proctor while treating victims of a hotel shooting; Dr. Deleo receives a prestigious offer.
3	"What Lies Beneath"	John Behring	Liz Kruger & Craig Shapiro	April 16, 2010	2J5203
Members of a wedding party are rushed to the hospital; Zambrano and Deleo's flirtation draws attention from the hospital staff.
4	"All Fall Down"	Danny Cannon	Elle Triedman	April 23, 2010	2J5205
A woman injured in a balcony collapse refuses treatment; a patient arrives at the hospital with a large sum of money.
5	"Golden Hour"	Matt Earl Beesley	Story by : Jeffrey Lieber & Scott Shapiro; Teleplay by : Jeffrey Lieber	April 30, 2010	2J5212
Dr. Proctor must give a speech illustrating how vital his team is in the minutes after a major accident.
6	"Calle Cubana"	Nathan Hope	Pamela Davis	May 7, 2010	2J5206
When a city celebration turns violent, the Alpha Team faces an increased workload; Dr. Zambrano takes a special interest in a teenager left for dead outside the hospital.
7	"Man on the Road"	Eagle Egilsson	Jeffrey Lieber	May 14, 2010	2J5207
As the doctors wait for news of their friend's condition, they treat victims of a motorcycle accident and a small plane crash.
8	"An Arm and a Leg"	Paris Barclay	Christina M. Kim & Scott Williams	May 21, 2010	2J5208
A young golf prodigy and three friends are attacked by an alligator.
9	"Like a Hurricane"	Karen Gaviola	Scott Williams	June 4, 2010	2J5202
The Alpha team must treat people injured in a car accident caused by a drunken driver trying to escape an oncoming hurricane; Zambrano's father visits the hospital.
10	"Diver Down"	Paul McCrane	Christina M. Kim	June 11, 2010	2J5204
The team helps adventurers who were injured while exploring underwater wreckage; Zambrano and Deleo grow curious about the new woman in Proctor's life.
11	"Time of Death"	Chris Leitch	Liz Kruger & Craig Shapiro	June 18, 2010	2J5209
Victims of a boating accident cause chaos at the hospital; Dr. Zambrano winds up in a tight spot.
12	"Down to the Bone"	Frederick E. O. Toye	Pamela Davis & Elle Triedman	June 25, 2010	2J5210
A giant sinkhole traps a construction worker underground; Dr. Warren's second encounter with Dr. Kaye has an unexpected result.
13	"Medicine Man"	Alex Zakrzewski	Steven Maeda	July 2, 2010	2J5211
Proctor and Zambrano question how far they will go for their patients in the aftermath of the accidents; Dr C. wonders if his brother's reappearance comes with strings attached.

== Ratings ==
Episode Number	Episode	Airdate	Rating	Share	Rating/Share (18–49)	Viewers (millions)	Rank (Timeslot)	Rank (Night)
1	"Pilot"	April 2, 2010	4.8	9	1.6/5	7.59	1	1
2	"88 Seconds"	April 9, 2010	4.8	9	1.4/5	7.11	1	5
3	"What Lies Beneath"	April 16, 2010	4.6	8	1.2/4	6.86	2	3
4	"All Fall Down"	April 23, 2010	4.1	7	1.0/3	6.08	2	10
5	"Golden Hour"	April 30, 2010						
6	"Calle Cubana"	May 7, 2010				6.27	1	3
7	"Man on the Road"	May 14, 2010				5.93	3	6
8	"An Arm and a Leg"	May 21, 2010			1.2/4	6.55		
9	"Like a Hurricane"	June 4, 2010			1.3/4	6.11		
10	"Diver Down"	June 11, 2010			1.4/5	7.02	1	2
11	"Time of Death"	June 18, 2010			1.1/2	5.90		
12	"Down to the Bone"	June 25, 2010			1.1/4	5.98		
13	"Medicine Man"	July 2, 2010			0.9/3	5.84		

== Broadcast ==
The first and only season of Miami Medical aired on CBS from April 2 until July 2, 2010.

== See also ==
- List of films and television shows set in Miami
