= Brian Levy =

American talent manager and producer

- Born: Denver, United States
- Occupations: Producer and Talent Manager
- Years active: 2007 - present

Brian Levy is an American film producer and literary manager at talent management firm Entertainment 360.

Levy produces feature films, television series and documentaries. He executive produced Lost Transmissions starring Juno Temple and Simon Pegg, Fear and Loathing in Aspen, 30 Minutes or Less starring Jesse Eisenberg and Danny McBride, and documentaries Rudeboy: The Story of Trojan Records and Meet Me in the Bathroom.

== Career ==
Previously, Levy ran the management division of Pulse Films, a subsidiary of Vice Media. In 2020, Levy became a literary manager at Management 360 and an executive at Entertainment 360.

=== Film Production ===
Currently Levy alongside Jamie Neely, Thomas Benski, and Sam Bridger are in production on a documentary film called Meet Me in the Bathroom, an adaptation of Lizzy Goodman's novel Meet Me in the Bathroom. Will Lovelace, Dylan Southern are directing the film.

In 2014, Levy was an executive producer on Revenge of the Green Dragons working closely to directors Andrew Lau and Andrew Loo.

In 2018, Levy executive produced the film Rudeboy: The Story of Trojan Records with director Nicolas Jack Davies. In 2021, Levy worked on Fear and Loathing in Aspen. In 2022, Levy produced Therapy Dogs. The film won the 2022 AGBO fellowship Award at the Slamdance Film Festival, won Best International Feature Film at Guanajuato International Film Festival, and won best film at NOAM Faenza Film Festival. In 2023, Levy was the producer of the film Coup!, a film written by Joseph Schuman and Austin Stark (The God Committee). The movie was premiered at the Venice International Film Festival.
