= Tangled (2001 film) =

2001 film by Jay Lowi

- DVD cover
- Directed by: Jay Lowi
- Screenplay by: Jeffrey Lieber
- Story by: Jeffrey Lieber; Michael Shapiro; Shawn Simons
- Produced by: Peter Abrams; Rachael Leigh Cook; Jennifer Gibgot; Robert L. Levy; Jonathon Komack Martin; Peter Wetherell
- Starring: Rachael Leigh Cook; Shawn Hatosy; Jonathan Rhys Meyers
- Edited by: Emma E. Hickox
- Production companies: Myriad Pictures; Tapestry Films
- Distributed by: Dimension Home Video
- Release dates: November 2, 2001 (Portugal); January 14, 2003 (United States)
- Running time: 100 minutes
- Country: United States
- Language: English

Tangled is a 2001 American romantic thriller film directed by Jay Lowi and starring Rachael Leigh Cook, Shawn Hatosy, and Jonathan Rhys Meyers. The plot is told from the end from David (Hatosy) found unable to remember what led him to be in hospital. As he begins to talk to the detective (Lorraine Bracco) the events slowly unfold. The film flicks between present and past with use of flashbacks to describe the friendship and the love triangle between David, Jenny (Cook) and Alan (Rhys Meyers).

== Plot ==
David (Shawn Hatosy) is wheeled into the emergency room following an accident. Claiming that he and his girlfriend have been kidnapped, a frantic David is interviewed by police detectives, Anders and Nagle (Lorraine Brocco and Dwayne Hill). Because David claims memory loss, the police ask him what time he remembers waking up the day before.

A flashback to the day before begins. David and his girlfriend, Jenny (Rachael Leigh Cook) get up and eat breakfast. They receive a hang-up call from Alan (Jonathan Rhys-Meyers) who, unbeknownst to them, is observing them from across the street.

David and Jenny quarrel briefly before David leaves the apartment to go to the store. Alan slips in while Jenny draws a bath. Alan surprises Jenny as David returns. Alan and David fight; David then retrieves a gun and the two men struggle over it. A shot is fired in Jenny's direction. She hits the floor.

The film resumes in the present when David tells the detectives that he has known Alan for quite some time, having met him in college. Another flashback begins. David and Jenny meet in their junior year of college and strike up a friendship. David is smitten with Jenny, writing poetry for her and spending hours discussing literature with her. Although Jenny enjoys their friendship, she makes it clear that David's romantic feelings are not returned and dates many other men.

David invites Jenny along to a family function. While there, they encounter Alan, who has also been invited. Jenny and Alan feel an immediate chemistry with each other.

Alan returns to school shortly thereafter and moves into an apartment. While David and Jenny help Alan move in, they discover that Alan is in possession of a very large amount of marijuana. Alan claims to be holding it for someone who left the country and hides it in a cookie jar.

Alan soon asks Jenny out. Jenny accepts the date and soon the two are a couple. David resents this and begins avoiding both of them.

Eager to broker a reconciliation, Alan tricks Jenny and David into accompanying him on a trip to the woods. In the woods, Alan brings Jenny and David into a long-abandoned mansion. Alan demands that Jenny and David reconcile; when they initially refuse, Alan cuts the palm of his hand. Horrified, Jenny and David apologize to each other. Alan then takes them on a tour of the property, telling the story of the former owner, a wealthy man with two sons whose rivalry ends in murder.

The three end up staying the night in the abandoned house and have a ménage à trois of sorts. When they return to school, Alan sets David up with Elise (Estella Warren), a girl who has no interest in literature or poetry. David, who is still in love with Jenny, reluctantly begins seeing Elise.

Shortly thereafter, Jenny receives a call from her estranged father who suggests a dinner date. She asks Alan to accompany her. Alan, who is beginning to feel suffocated in the relationship, balks. David offers to go in his place. Jenny's father never shows up for the dinner and David takes a disappointed Jenny home. David makes a play for Jenny's romantic affections; Jenny angrily rejects him and runs into her apartment where she finds Alan and Elise in bed together.

Jenny breaks up with Alan. Alan begins stalking her, begging her to take him back. After a confrontation in the library, David and Alan fight with David punching Alan in the mouth. David before leaving. That night, someone throws a large rock through Jenny's window. Convinced that Alan is responsible and fearing for her safety, Jenny asks David to let her stay with him. David eagerly assents. The next day, David witnesses Alan being led out of his apartment in handcuffs. Someone tipped the police about Alan's supply of drugs. Later that night, Jenny declares her affections for David and the two sleep together.

Alan is sentenced to eighteen months for drug possession and is institutionalized for a time after his release. Meanwhile, David and Jenny, who have become a couple, graduate from college and move in together, being careful to get an unlisted number.

The film resumes in the present. The police, who had already found Alan's car, find Jenny and Alan, both of them clinging to life. Detective Anders briefly puts David under arrest, feeling that he is responsible for what happened. David swears his innocence and asks for an opportunity to finish his story.

David claims that Alan kidnaps both he and Jenny, tying both of them up and driving them back to the abandoned mansion. Once there, he leads Jenny into the house, leaving David tied up in the car. David manages to free himself and runs inside to rescue Jenny. Once inside, he hears Alan demanding that Jenny tell him that he and their relationship had meant something to her. When Jenny does as she is asked, Alan, convinced that she was the one to call the police, asks her why she set him up.

As David finishes his story, a comatose Alan is wheeled into the hospital, followed by Jenny who has recovered well enough from her injuries to walk unassisted. Jenny corroborates much of David's story. The detectives opt not to charge David with a crime. After David is released from the hospital, he and Jenny look in on Alan who is still unconscious.

Jenny tells David that she had been wrong about both Alan and David and that she is glad that she is with David. She asks him to take her home. The two leave the hospital.

As they leave the hospital, another flashback begins from David. It is then revealed that David manipulated Elise into going to Alan's apartment during Jenny's dinner with her father and that he, not Alan, had thrown the rock through Jenny's window. And that Jenny admitted she loved Alan back. And David did not shoot Alan in self-defense, but was consumed with jealousy and shot Alan to get him out of the picture so he could have Jenny for himself. At this point, David reveals himself. The two fight and accidentally knock Jenny over the balcony. Convinced that Jenny is dead, Alan rushes down the stairs past David who follows closely. While Alan kneels over an unconscious Jenny, David pulls out his gun and trains it on Alan. It is then that he reveals that he, not Jenny, was the one who called the police. David tells Alan that he resented the fact that Jenny always rejected him in favor of inappropriate men and that he felt that Jenny would finally see that he was the best partner for her if Alan was out of the picture. He then shoots Alan several times. After the shooting, David leaves the mansion in search of help for Jenny. He was then hit by a car and taken to the hospital.

== Cast ==
- Rachael Leigh Cook as Jenny Kelley
- Shawn Hatosy as David Klein
- Jonathan Rhys Meyers as Alan Hammond
- Lorraine Bracco as Det. Ann Anders
- Dwayne Hill as Det. Dennys Nagel

== Reception ==
Reel Film Reviews gave the film 1/2 star, and wrote: "The film, which generally feels like the pilot episode of a low-rent CW series, has been padded out to a degree that inevitably becomes oppressive". Steve Rhodes of Internet Reviews gave film 2/4 and wrote: "Tangled isn't nearly tangled enough. When this lightweight thriller works at all, it is as a mildly pleasant romance".
