= Misconduct (film) =

2016 film

- Theatrical release poster
- Directed by: Shintaro Shimosawa
- Written by: Adam Mason; Simon Boyes
- Produced by: Ellen Wander
- Starring: Josh Duhamel; Alice Eve; Malin Åkerman; Byung-hun Lee; Julia Stiles; Glen Powell; Al Pacino; Anthony Hopkins
- Cinematography: Michael Fimognari
- Edited by: Gregers Dohn; Henrik Kallberg
- Music by: Federico Jusid
- Production companies: Grindstone Entertainment Group; Mandate Pictures; Mike and Marty Productions
- Distributed by: Lionsgate Premiere
- Release date: February 5, 2016 (United States)
- Running time: 105 minutes
- Country: United States
- Language: English
- Budget: $11 million
- Box office: $2.1 million

Misconduct is a 2016 American thriller film directed by Shintaro Shimosawa in his directorial debut and written by Simon Boyes and Adam Mason. The film stars Josh Duhamel, Alice Eve, Malin Åkerman, Byung-hun Lee, Julia Stiles and Glen Powell, with Al Pacino and Anthony Hopkins in supporting roles. The film was released in a limited release and through video on demand on February 5, 2016, by Lionsgate Premiere.

== Plot ==
Arthur Denning is the owner of a major pharmaceutical firm. He is very controlling of his girlfriend Emily Hynes, and she is physically intimidated by his security guards. She is abducted, and Denning is sent photos of her bruised face. He is ordered to go to an art gallery with the ransom. When a man approaches him, Denning attacks him, but learns that he was the gallery owner.

Before her abduction, Hynes reaches out to her ex-boyfriend Ben Cahill. She hints at Denning's abuse and shares some dirt that she has on him. At her apartment, she shows Cahill some files that she has stolen from Denning's laptop that reveal his criminal behavior during drug trials. She soon convinces a stranger to beat her up for the photo that she sends to Denning.

Cahill uses the information from Hynes to pitch a class-action lawsuit to his boss Charles Abrams that he files against Denning. That evening, Cahill is stunned to find Hynes dead in her apartment. With a bottle of pills in her hand and a lethal cocktail of drugs in her system, her death is suspicious but possibly just a suicide. Cahill decides to leave the scene without reporting it to the police and tries to cover his tracks, secretly telling only his wife about it.

At a preliminary deposition to the lawsuit, Denning suddenly settles the suit for $400 million, provided that the stolen documents are returned to him. Before long, Hynes's body is found in Cahill's home. Convinced that he is being framed, he confronts Denning, who is amused at Cahill's passion, but assures him that he had nothing to do with it.

A hitman kidnaps Cahill and his wife Charlotte (Eve), but Cahill overpowers and kills him. When he inspects the hitman's files, he realizes that the villain is actually his boss. Abrams has been colluding with Denning for years, deliberately losing all of the cases that his clients brought against the pharmaceutical magnate. The settlement was all just an elaborate way of protecting Denning from criminal liability.

Cahill submits the hitman's files to the police, who arrest Abrams. Before he can be taken into custody, however, Abrams grabs an officer's gun and kills himself.

As Cahill packs for a move to a new house, he notices that some of his wife's clothing smells like Hynes's perfume. He asks her what happened between the two of them. Charlotte confesses that she confronted Hynes about her involvement with her husband. They had an argument in which Charlotte hit Hynes, causing her to fall and hit her head. Although Charlotte is a nurse, she did not help her and stages the scene for the police.

== Cast ==
- Josh Duhamel as Ben Cahill
- Alice Eve as Charlotte Cahill
- Malin Åkerman as Emily Hynes
- Al Pacino as Charles Abrams
- Anthony Hopkins as Arthur Denning
- Julia Stiles as Jane Clemente
- Byung-hun Lee as The Accountant
- Glen Powell as Doug Fields
- Skye P. Marshall as Hatty
- Gregory Alan Williams as Richard Hill
- Ara Gelici as Joseph Andolini
- Jason Gibson as Graham
- Chris Marquette as Giffords
- Sara Fletcher as 911 Operator

== Production ==
On February 6, 2015, Hopkins, Pacino, Dan Stevens, Åkerman and Lee joined the cast of the film, at the time titled Beyond Deceit. On March 10, 2015, Duhamel and Eve joined the cast.

=== Filming ===
Principal photography began on March 20, 2015, in New Orleans, Louisiana.

== Release ==
On April 1, 2015, Lionsgate acquired distribution rights to the film through their Lionsgate Premiere label. The film was released in a limited release and through video on demand on February 5, 2016.

It received a limited theatrical release in the UK through Reel Cinemas in June 2016, grossing £97 (£19.40 per screen) in its opening weekend.

== Critical response ==
On the review aggregator website Rotten Tomatoes, Misconduct holds a 7% approval rating based on 27 reviews, with an average rating of 2.5/10. On Metacritic, the film has a score of 24 out of 100, based on 10 critics, indicating "generally unfavorable" reviews.

Joe Leydon of Variety gave the film a negative review, writing, "Misconduct, a flagrantly derivative but modestly diverting drama of the sort that once claimed acres of shelf space at Blockbuster outlets. Anthony Hopkins and Al Pacino saunter through the proceedings while picking up easy paychecks and providing marquee allure, but it’s up to the top-billed Josh Duhamel to do most of the heavy lifting in this neo-noir scenario about an ambitious lawyer who bends the rules during litigation against a corrupt pharmaceutical tycoon, only to become entangled in at least two conspiracies. Limited theatrical play will be a mere formality, as is usually the case for such VOD-ready fare."

Frank Scheck of The Hollywood Reporter also gave the film a negative review, writing, "Although one of its central characters is a ruthless, unscrupulous pharmaceutical company executive, Misconduct, sadly, is not a biopic about Martin Shkreli. Rather, it's the sort of by-the-numbers, forgettable thriller, starring actors whose marquee days are behind them, that is routinely dumped in theaters and on VOD. Showcased here are Anthony Hopkins and Al Pacino, reminding us that the 1970s and 1980s were a long time ago."

The film was also awarded the Barry L. Bumstead Award (For a movie that cost a lot and lost a lot) at the 37th Golden Raspberry Awards.
