= Jeffrey Lieber =

American screenwriter

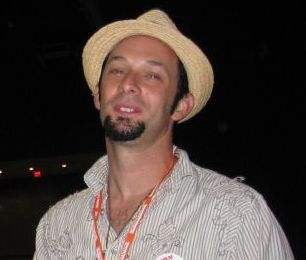
- Lieber at the 2008 Netroots Nation convention
- Born: Evanston, Illinois, United States
- Occupation(s): Film and television producer, director, screenwriter.

Jeffrey Michael Lieber is an American screenwriter for both television and film. He is credited as a co-creator of the television series Lost. In addition to writing for television and film, Lieber blogged (through 2016) at the website dailykos. His blog posts appeared as "diaries" rather than front-page posts and typically had a satirical take on the news.

== Early life ==
He was born in Evanston, Illinois, United States and attended Evanston Township High School. He attended the University of Illinois at Urbana–Champaign and earned a BFA in acting from the Department of Theatre.

== Career ==
Lieber is credited on the films Tuck Everlasting and Tangled, as well as having been creator/executive producer for unaired TV pilots for Fox Broadcasting Company (2004) and Sony Television in (2008).

ABC hired Lieber, based on his pitch with studio Spelling Television, to write a pilot for Lost. Lieber's initial pitch for the series, then titled Nowhere, was a realistic drama series heavily influenced by Lord of the Flies and Cast Away. As the project developed, ABC soured on the direction they had given Lieber, and approached J. J. Abrams and Damon Lindelof, who had an overall deal with their own studio, to rewrite. An industry-standard arbitration was triggered by the competing drafts and the Writers Guild of America (WGA) ultimately recognized Lieber as co-creator of the show (Lieber shares story credit with Abrams and Lindelof on the pilot). Aside from his initial pilot scripts, Lieber had no further input into Lost. Lieber and the Lost writing staff won the Writers Guild of America (WGA) Award for Best Dramatic Series at the February 2006 ceremony for their work on the first and second seasons.

In 2010, Miami Medical was canceled after 13 episodes. From 2011 to 2013, he served as an Executive Producer and Showrunner on the USA Network show Necessary Roughness. He was the co-showrunner and an executive producer on NCIS: New Orleans until 2015. He has also written for Lucifer, Charmed and created the YouTube series Impulse.

== Filmography ==
=== Screenplays for feature films ===
Year	Title	Notes
2001	Tangled	
2002	Tuck Everlasting	Co-wrote with James V. Hart

=== Television ===
Year	Title	Creator	Writer	Executive producer	Notes
2004	Lost	Yes	Story	No	Co-creator, 2 Episodes
2010	Miami Medical	Yes	Yes	Yes	Co-writer, 3 Episodes
2011–2012	Necessary Roughness	No	Yes	Yes	Co-writer, 4 Episodes
2014–2016	NCIS: New Orleans	No	Yes	Yes	4 Episodes
2016	Lucifer	No	Yes	No	1 Episode
2018–2022	Charmed	No	Yes	No	Co-writer, 8 Episodes
2018	Impulse	Yes	Story	Yes	
2024–present	Matlock	No	Yes	Yes	Co-writer, 4 Episodes
