= 5th Astra TV Awards =

2025 American television programming awards

- Date: June 10, 2025
- Site: SLS Hotel Beverly Hills; Hollywood, California
- Hosted by: Maxi Witrak
- Most wins: Adolescence; The Studio (4)
- Most nominations: The Studio (14)
- Website: theastras.com

Television/radio coverage
- Network: KNEKT Television Network; YouTube (@TheAstraAwards)

The 5th Astra TV Awards were presented by the Hollywood Creative Alliance on June 10, 2025, with nominations announced on May 15, 2025.

Apple TV+'s The Studio received the most nominations with 14, including Best Comedy Series, Best Actor (Seth Rogen), Best Supporting Actor (Ike Barinholtz), and Best Supporting Actress (Catherine O'Hara and Chase Sui Wonders). Severance and The Last of Us tied for second place with 13 nominations each. Broadcast comedies also dominated with ABC's Abbott Elementary and CBS' Ghosts receiving 10 nominations each.

Some of the other top contenders with multiple nominations included HBO's The White Lotus with 11, FX's The Bear and HBO Max's Hacks with 10 each, Apple TV+'s Shrinking with 9, HBO's The Penguin, Hulu's Only Murders in the Building and Netflix's Adolescence with 8 each, ABC's Will Trent and HBO Max's The Pitt with 6 each, and Peacock's Poker Face and Showtime's Yellowjackets with 5 each.

== Winners and nominees ==
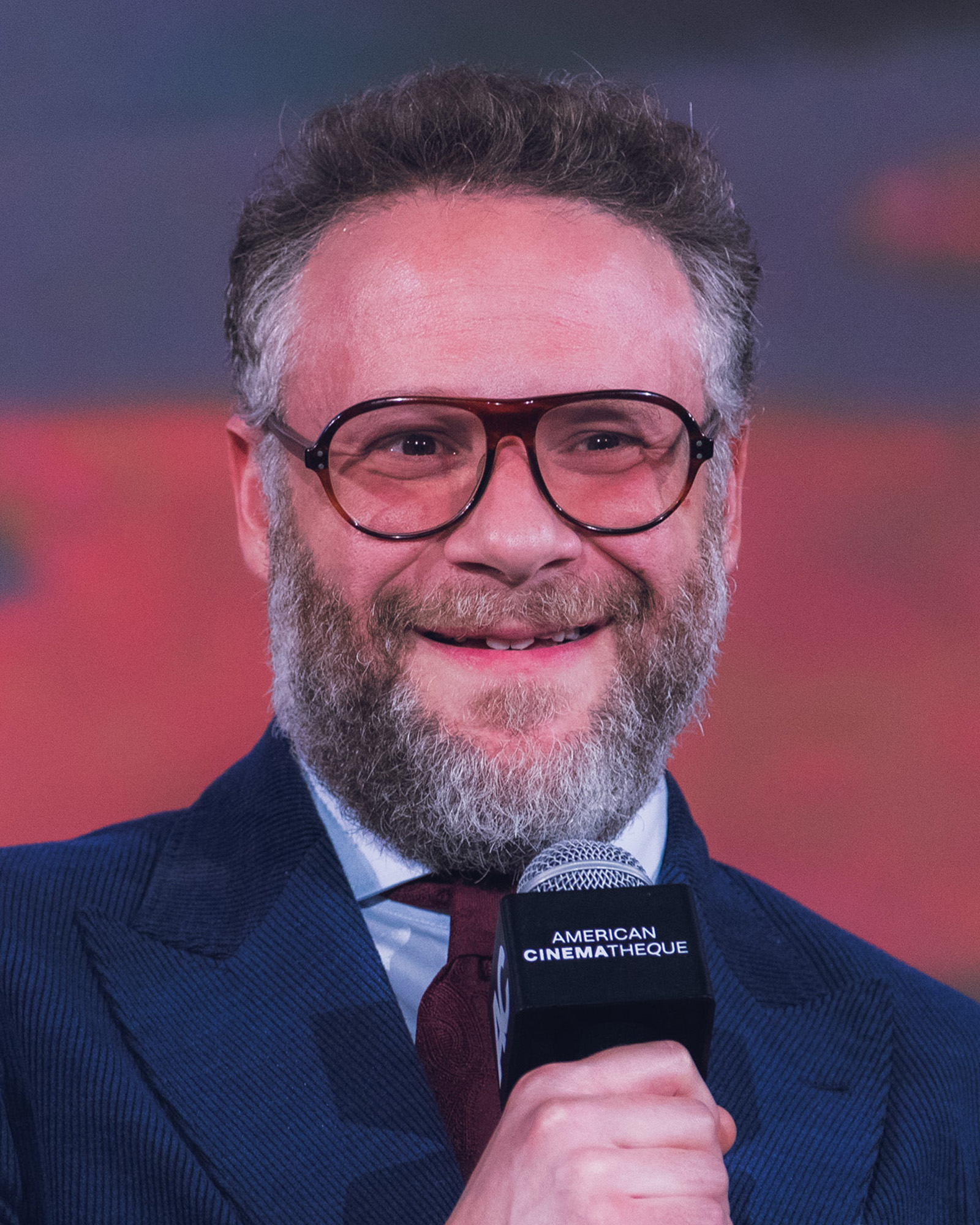
Seth Rogen, Best Actor in a Comedy Series winner

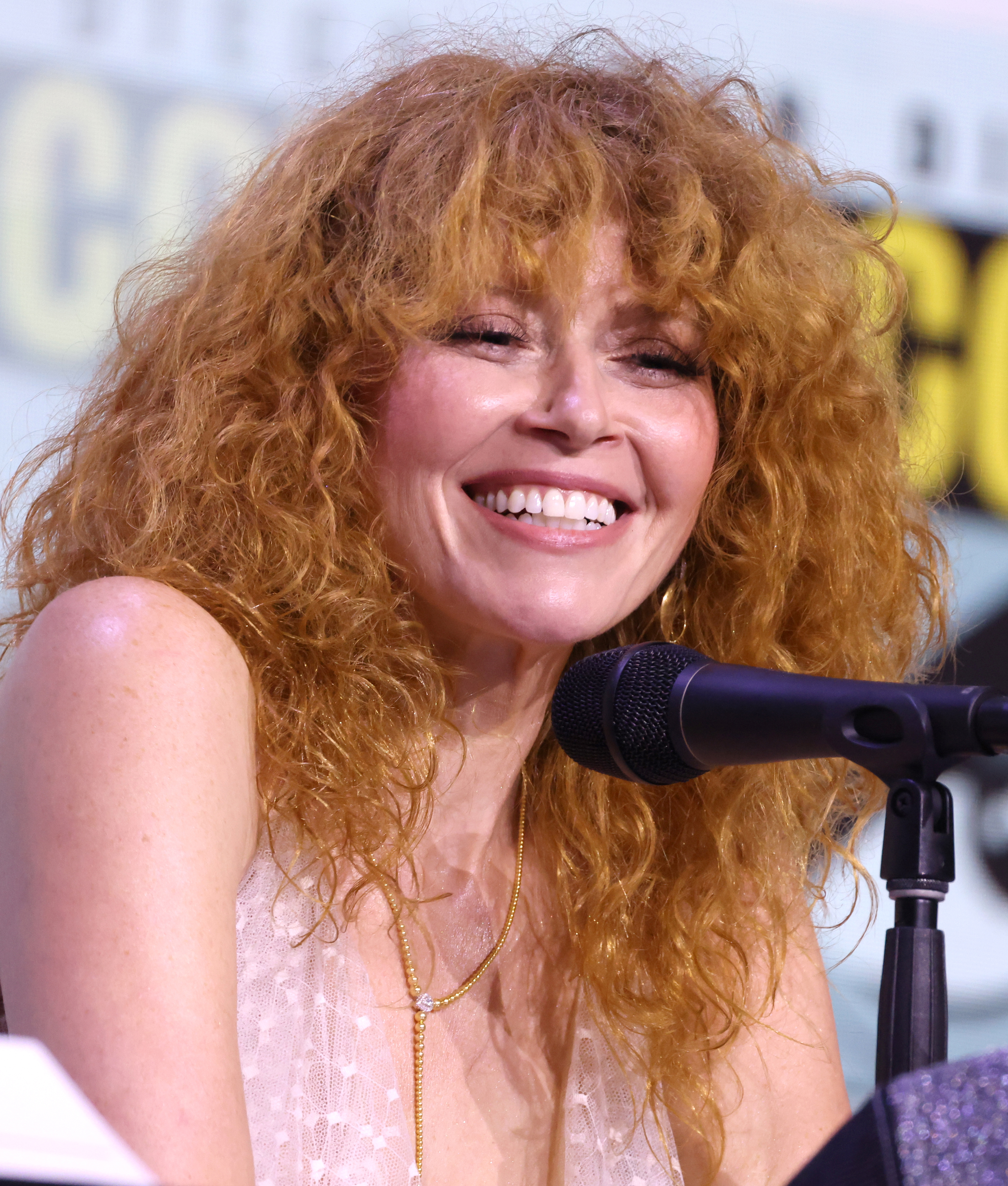
Natasha Lyonne, Best Actress in a Comedy Series winner

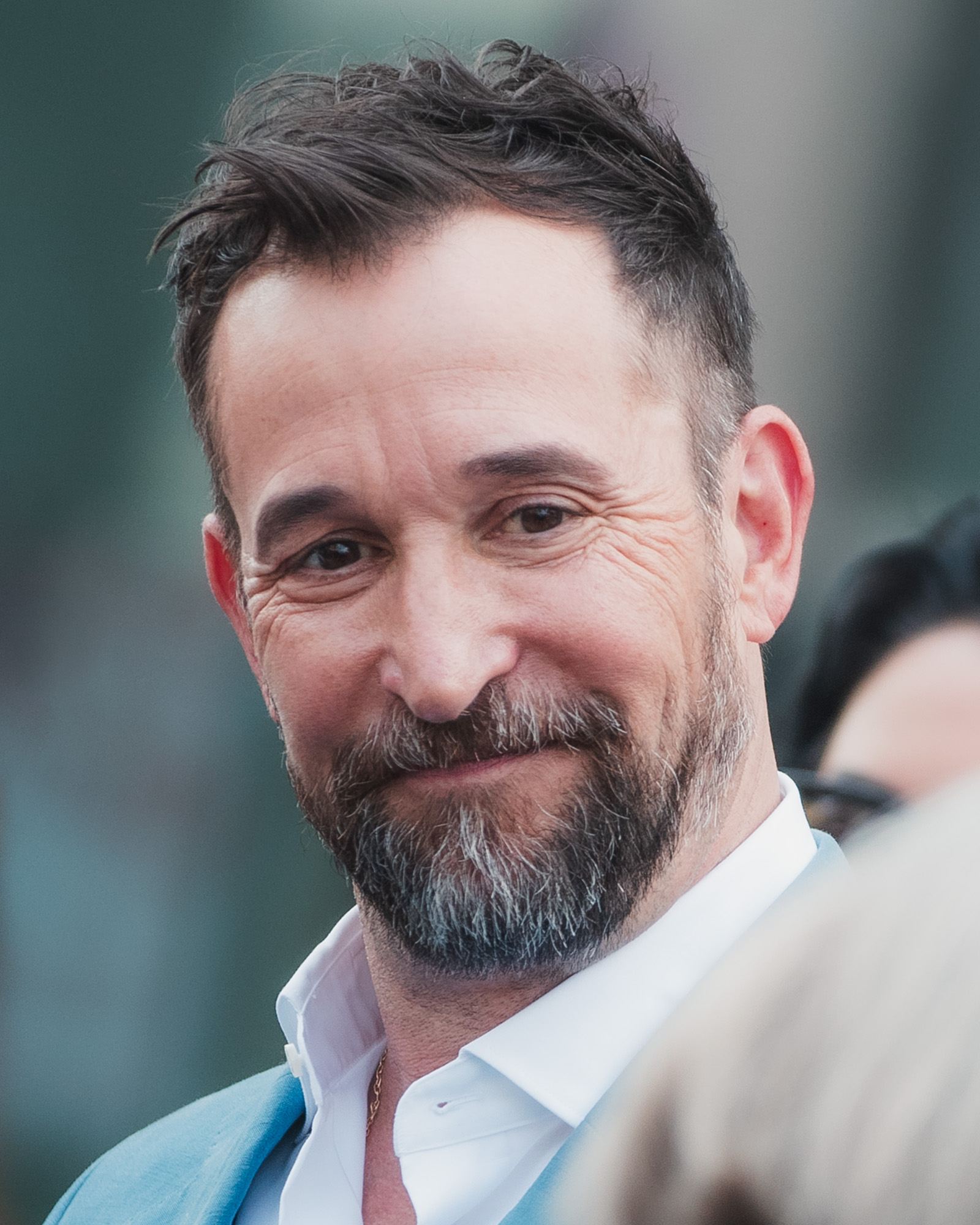
Noah Wyle, Best Actor in a Drama Series winner

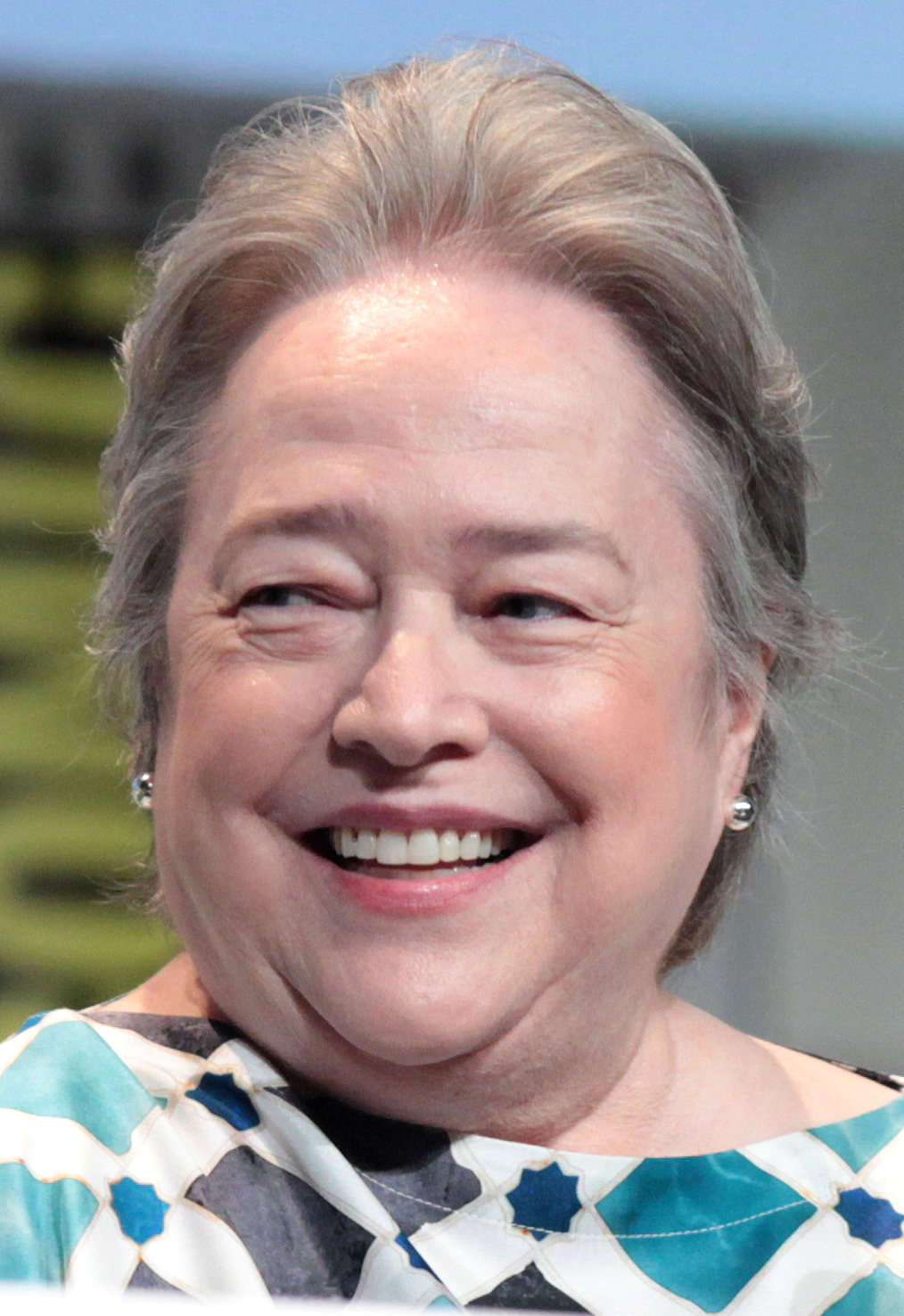
Kathy Bates, Best Actress in a Drama Series winner

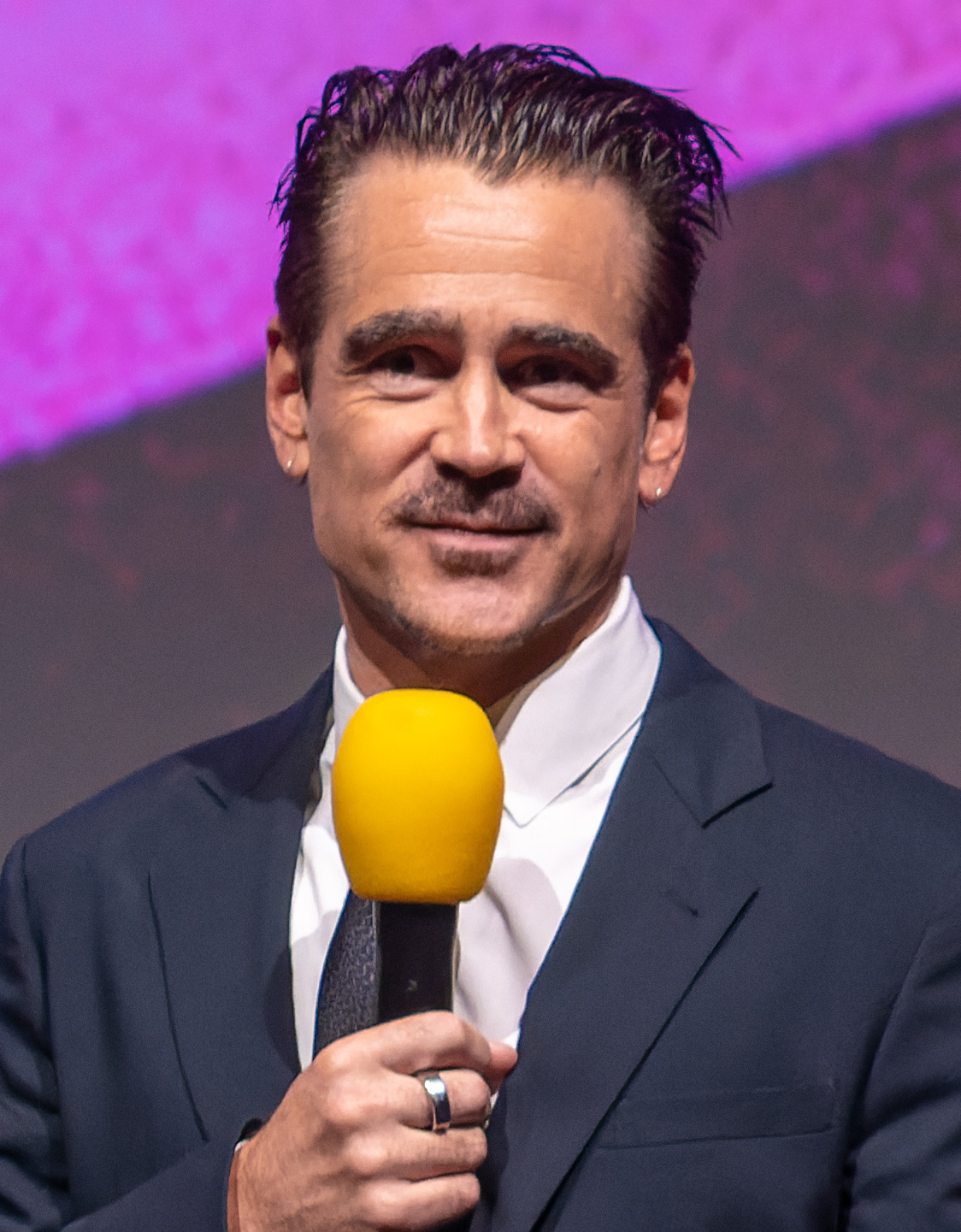
Colin Farrell, Best Actor in a Limited Series or TV Movie winner

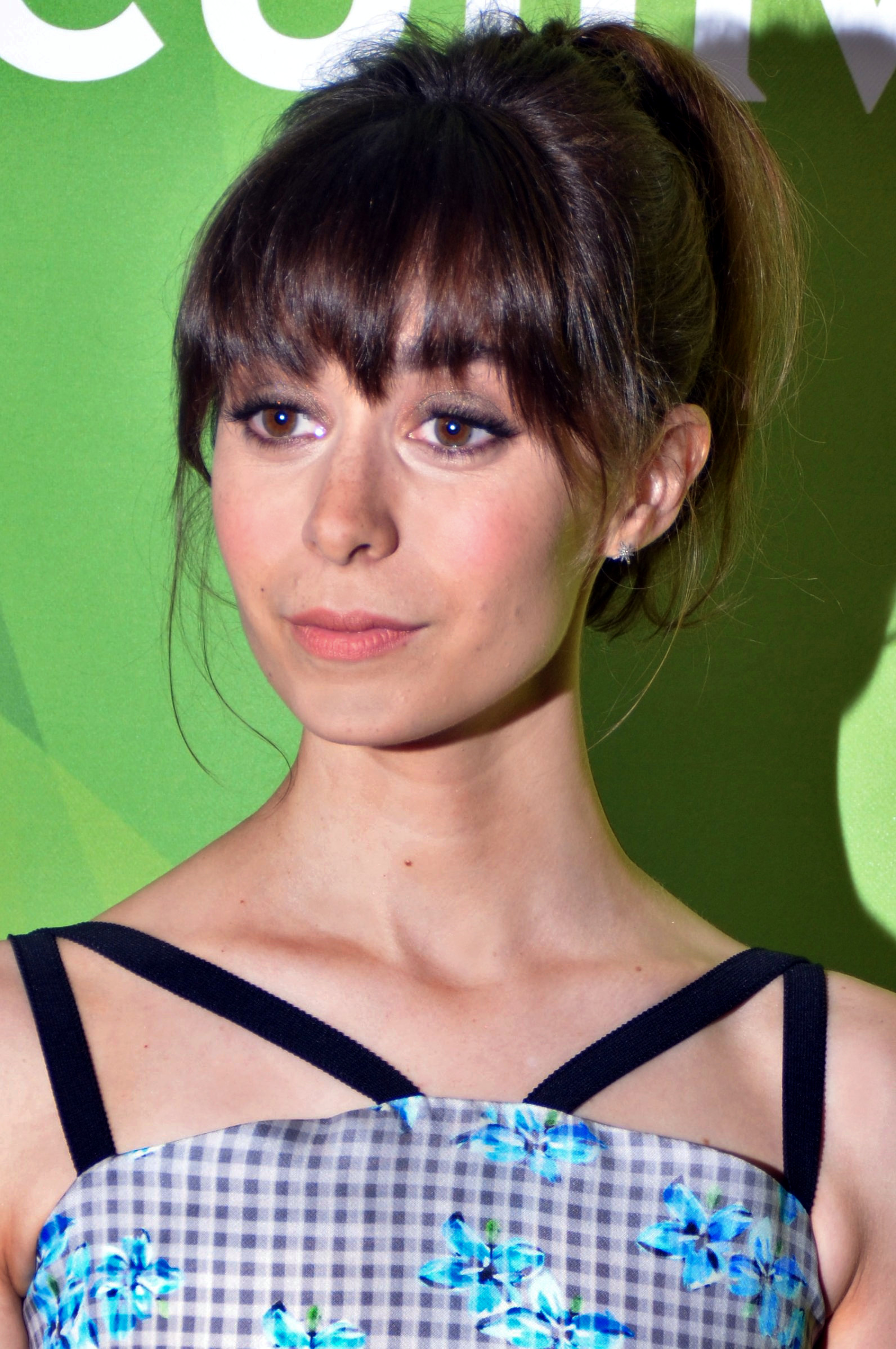
Cristin Milioti, Best Actress in a Limited Series or TV Movie and Best Supporting Actress in a Limited Series or TV Movie winner

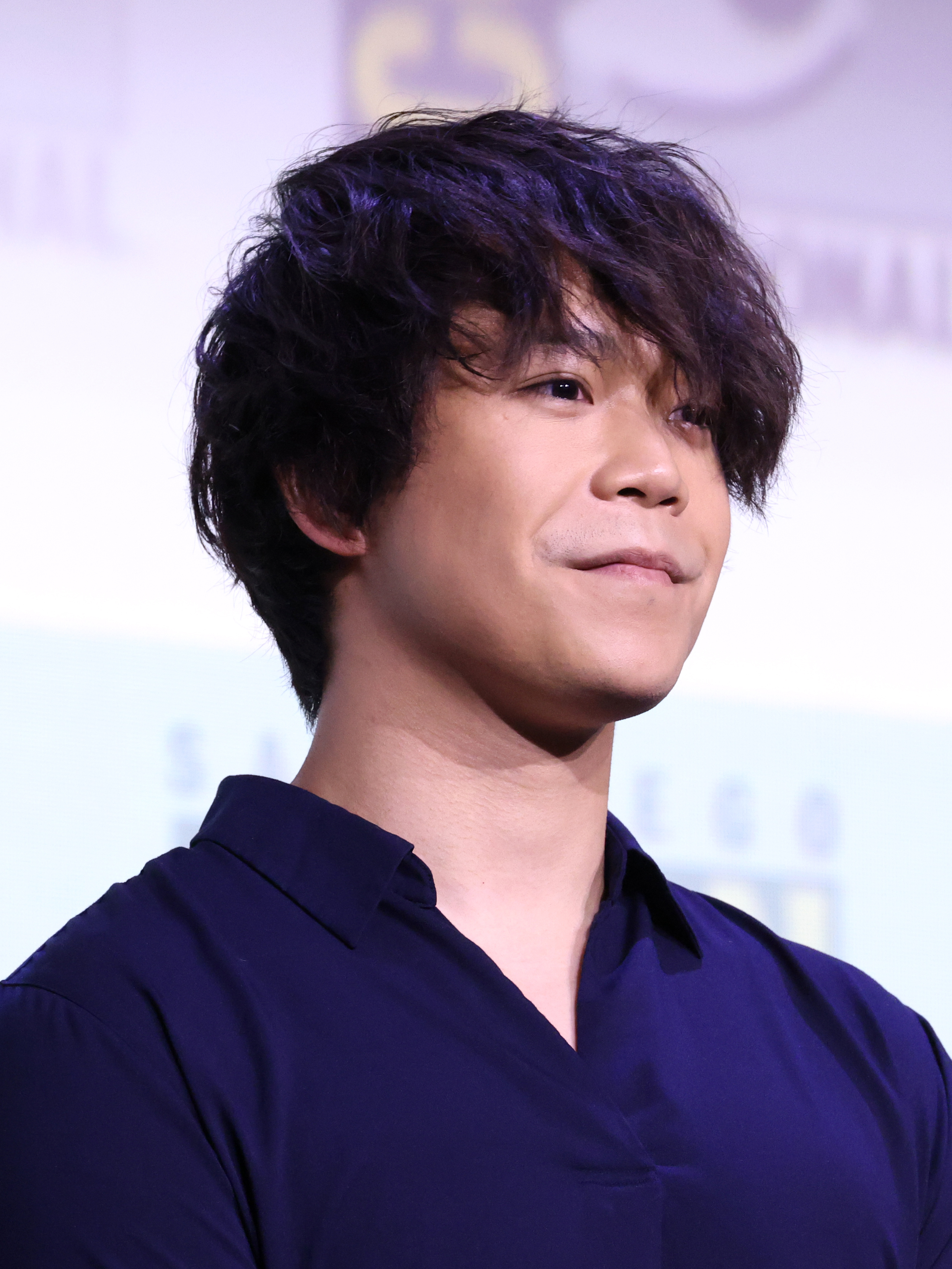
Aleks Le, Best Lead Voice-Over Performance winner

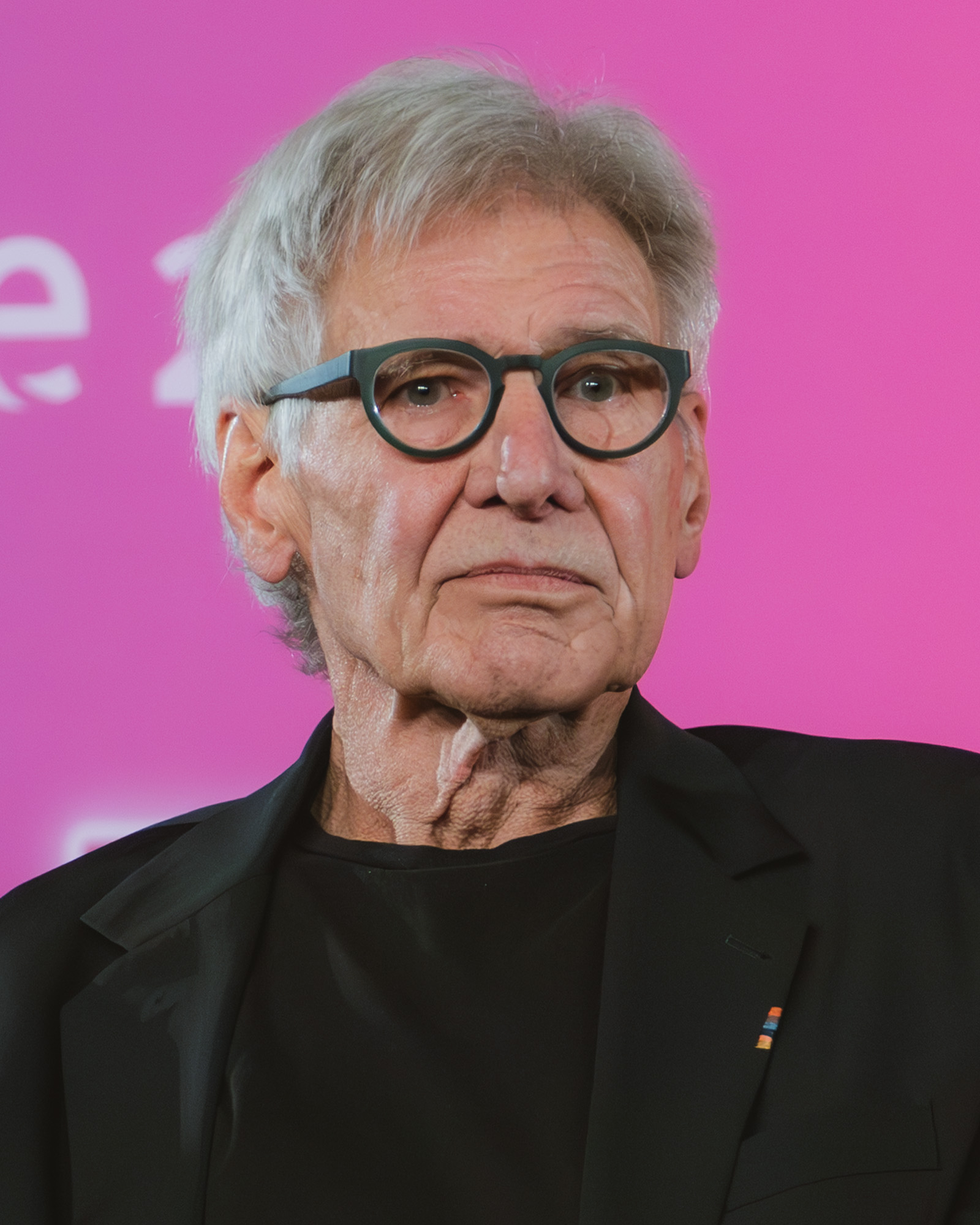
Harrison Ford, Best Supporting Actor in a Comedy Series winner

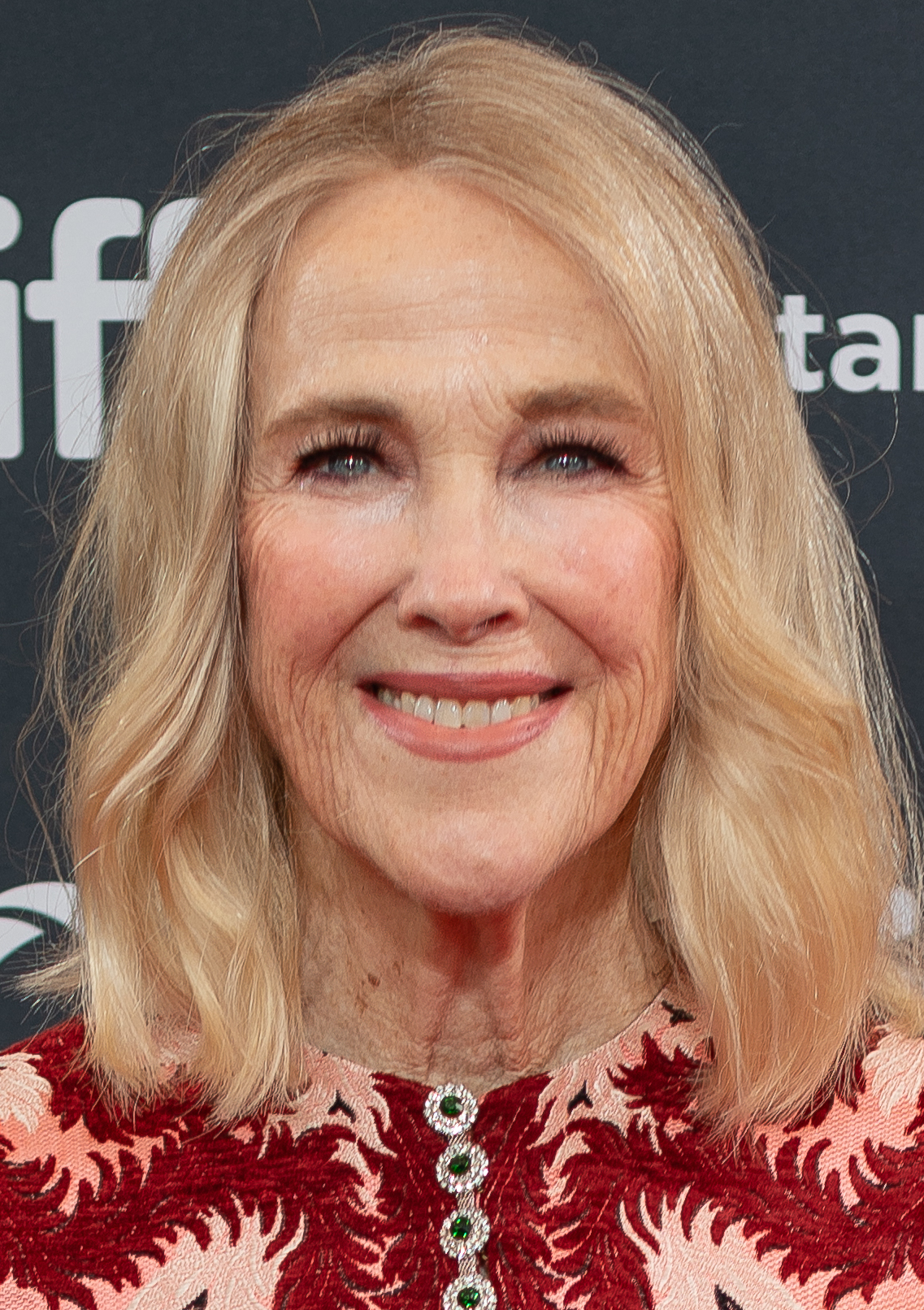
Catherine O'Hara, Best Supporting Actress in a Comedy Series winner

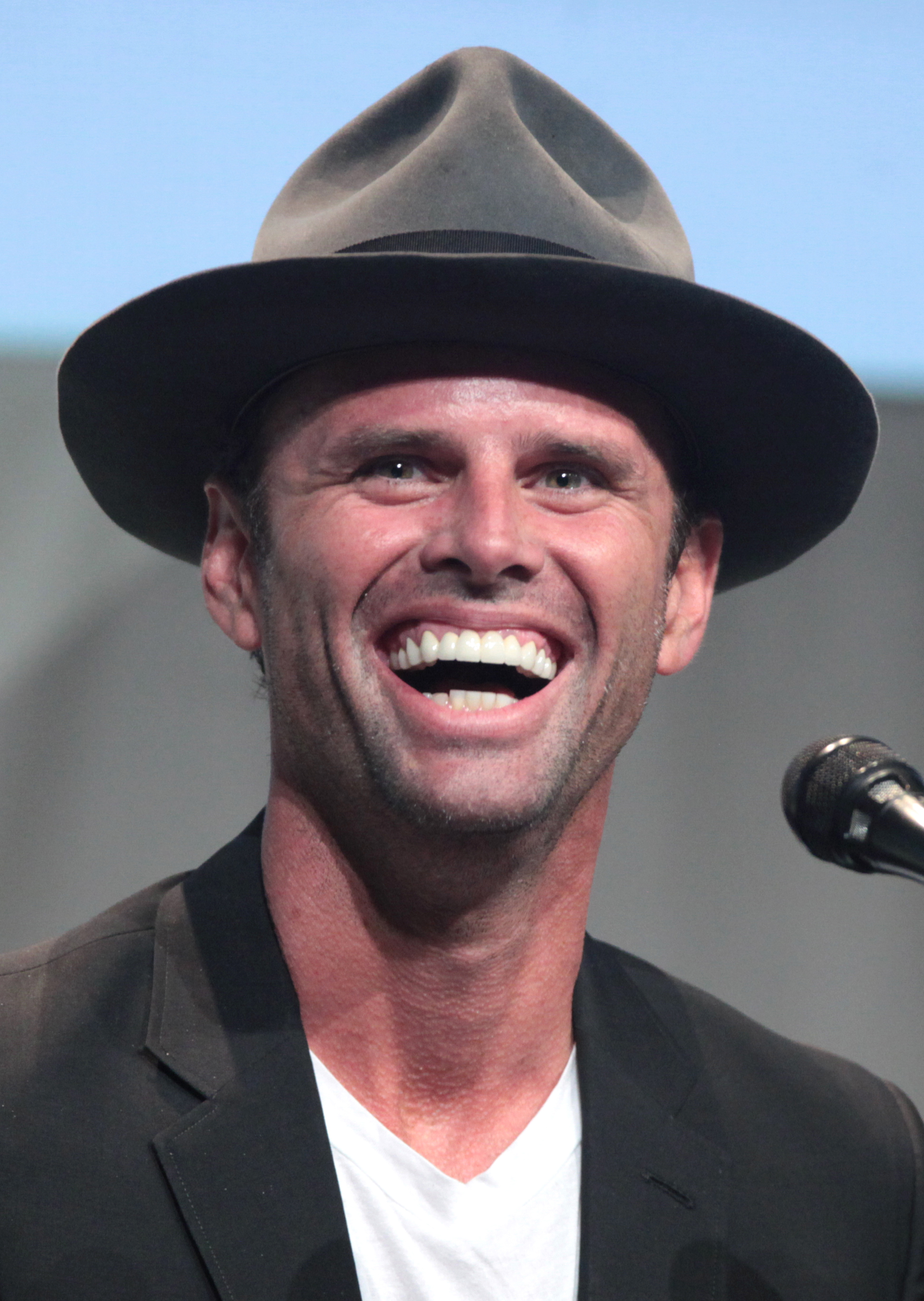
Walton Goggins, Best Supporting Actor in a Drama Series winner

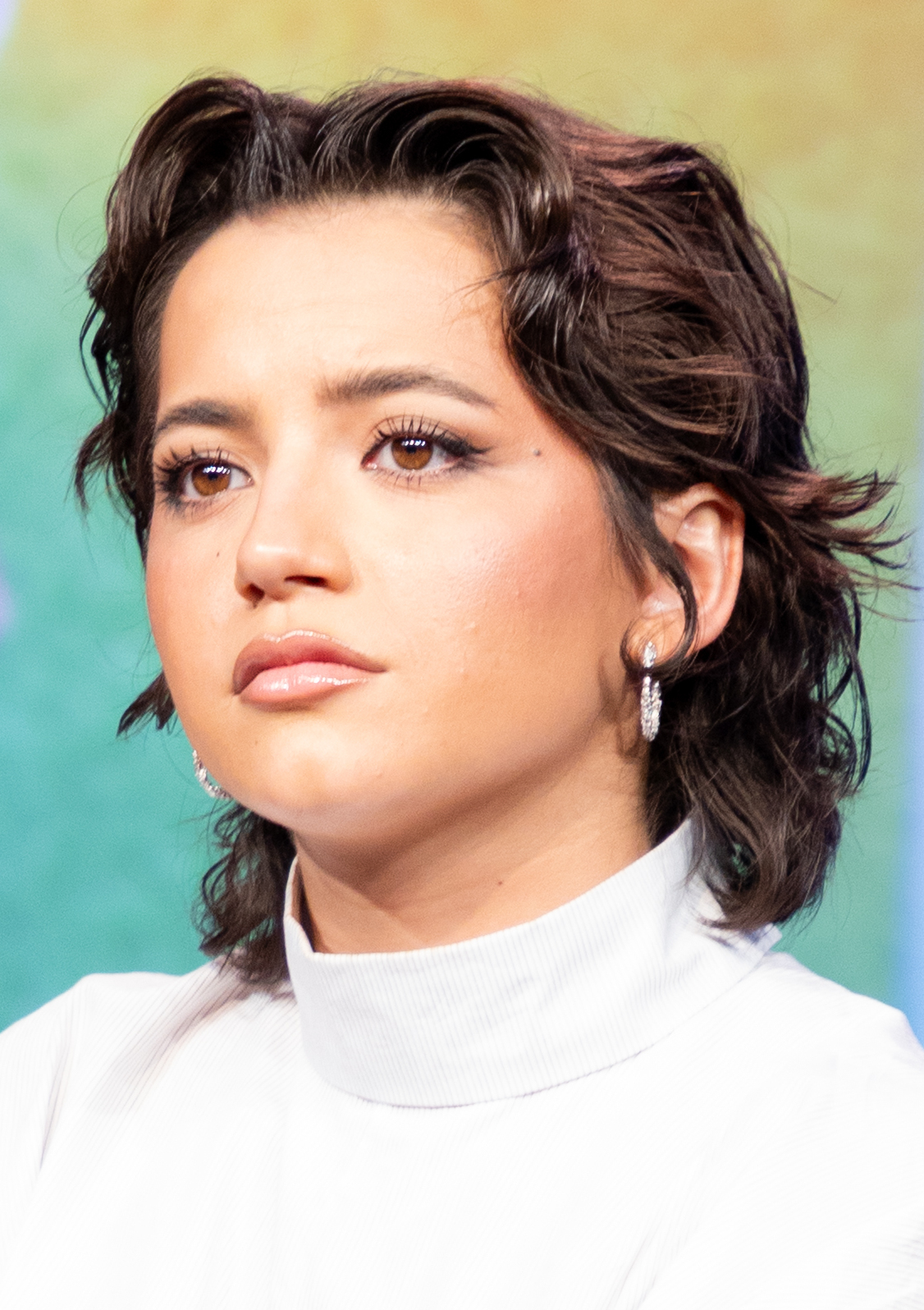
Isabela Merced, Best Supporting Actress in a Drama Series winner

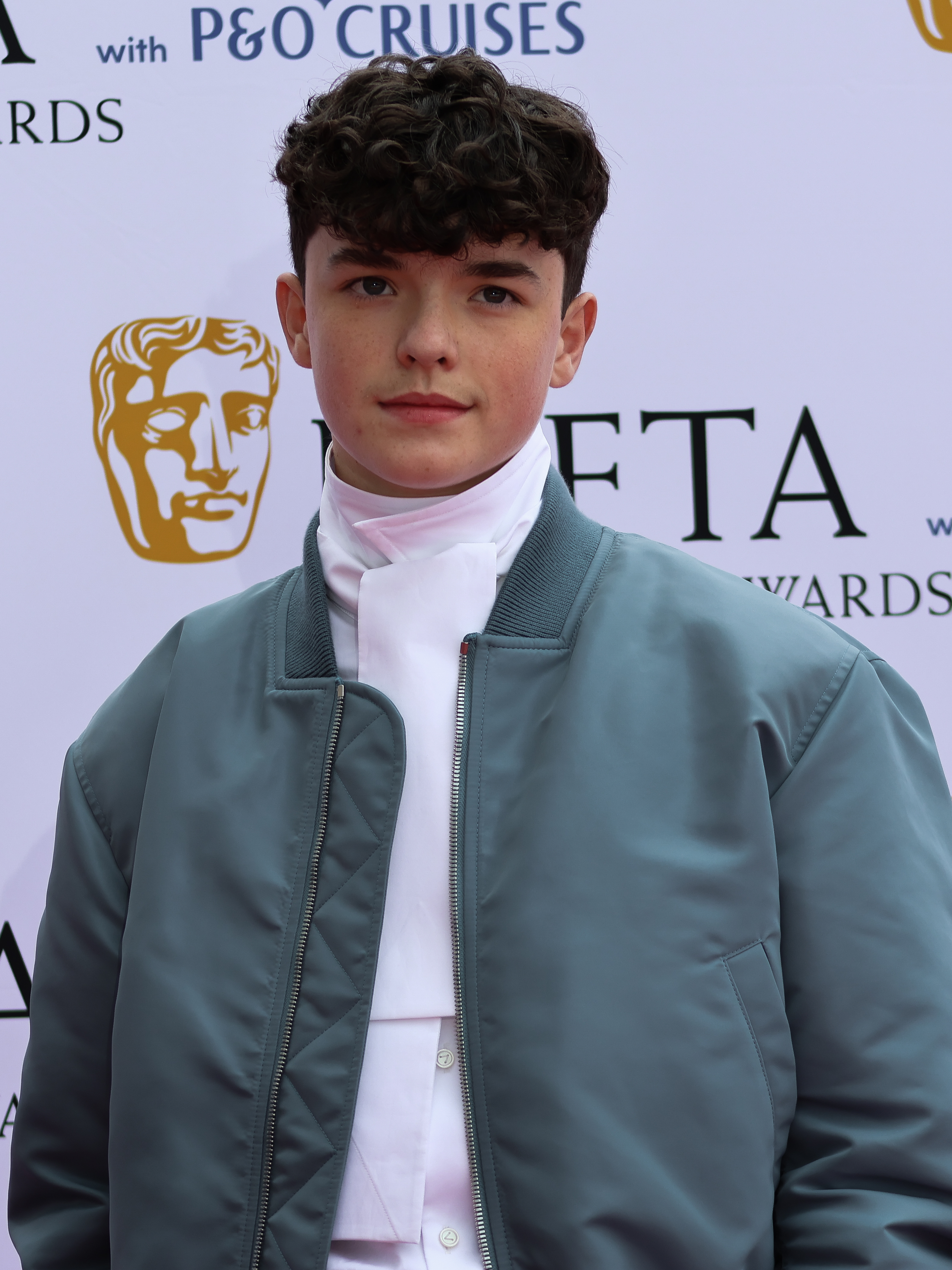
Owen Cooper, Best Supporting Actor in a Limited Series or TV Movie winner

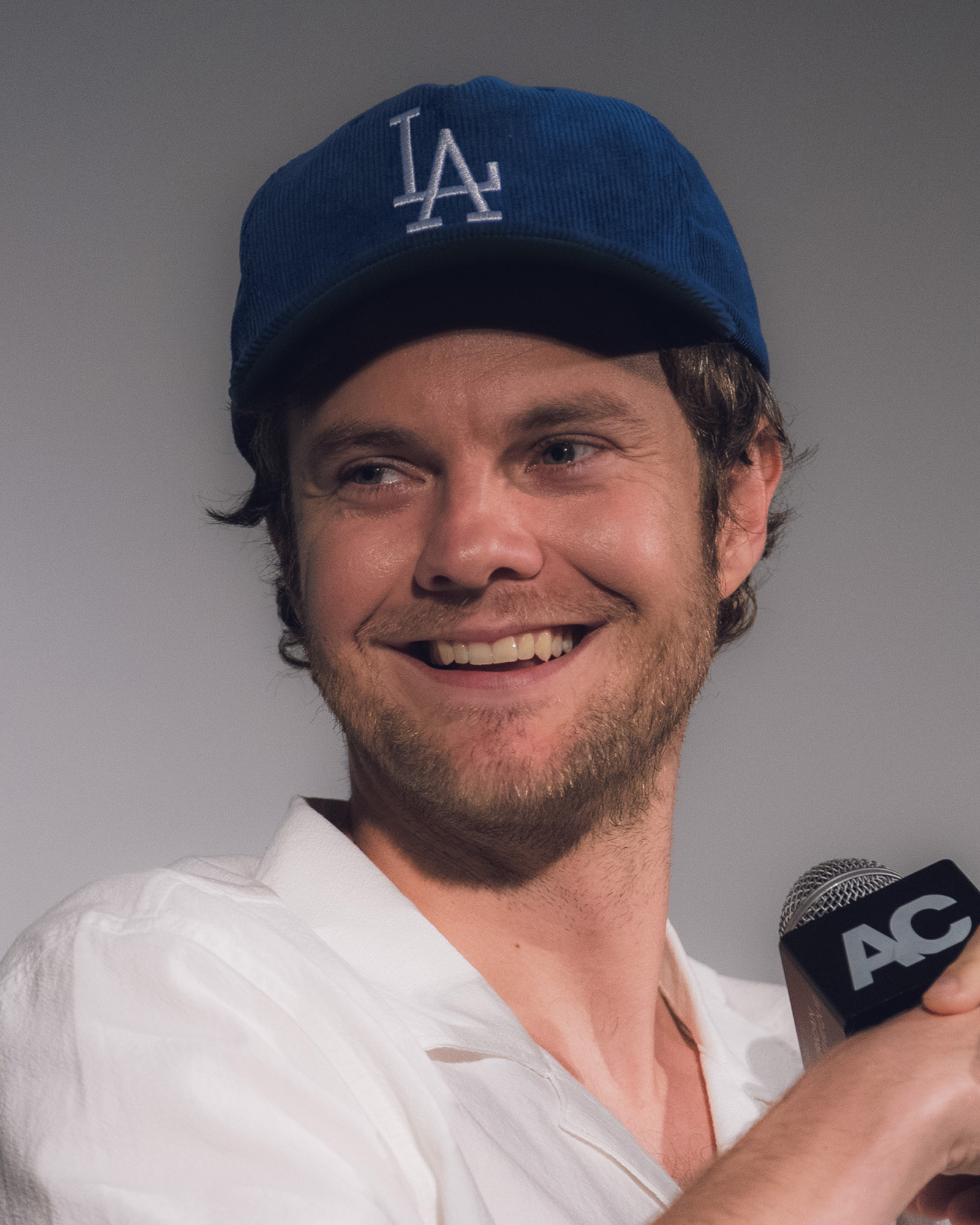
Jack Quaid, Best Supporting Voice-Over Performance winner

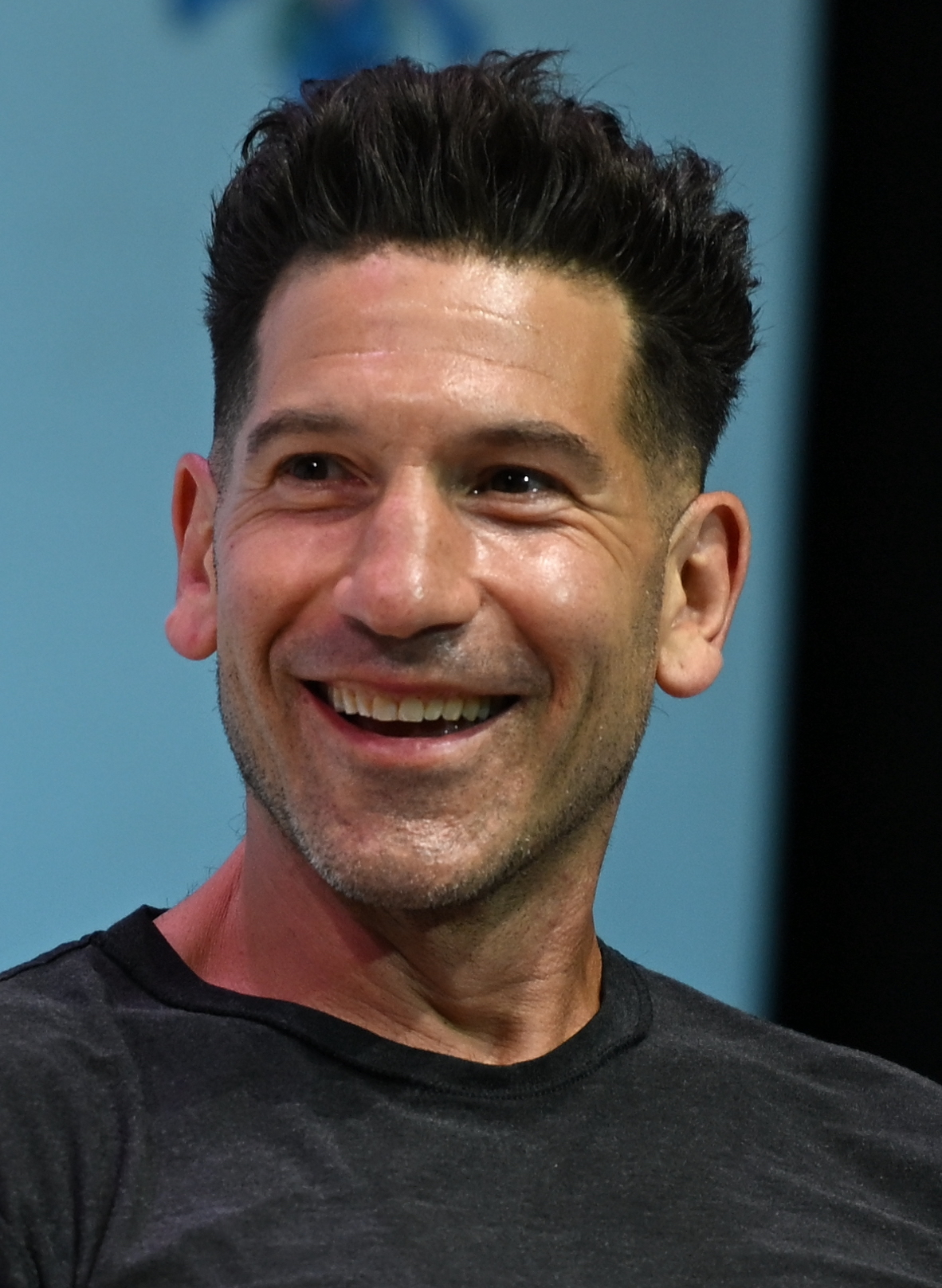
Jon Bernthal, Best Guest Actor in a Comedy Series winner

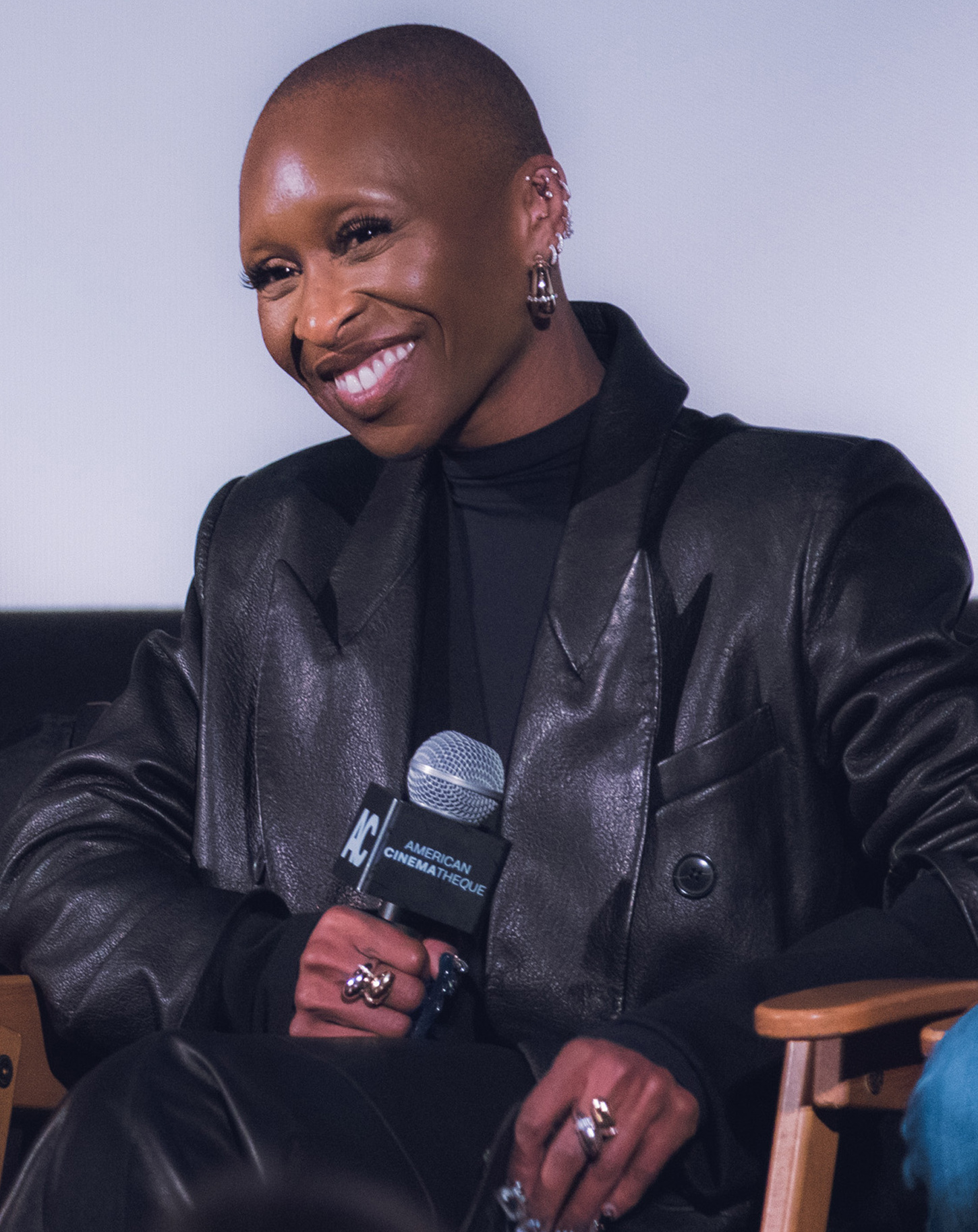
Cynthia Erivo, Best Guest Actress in a Comedy Series winner

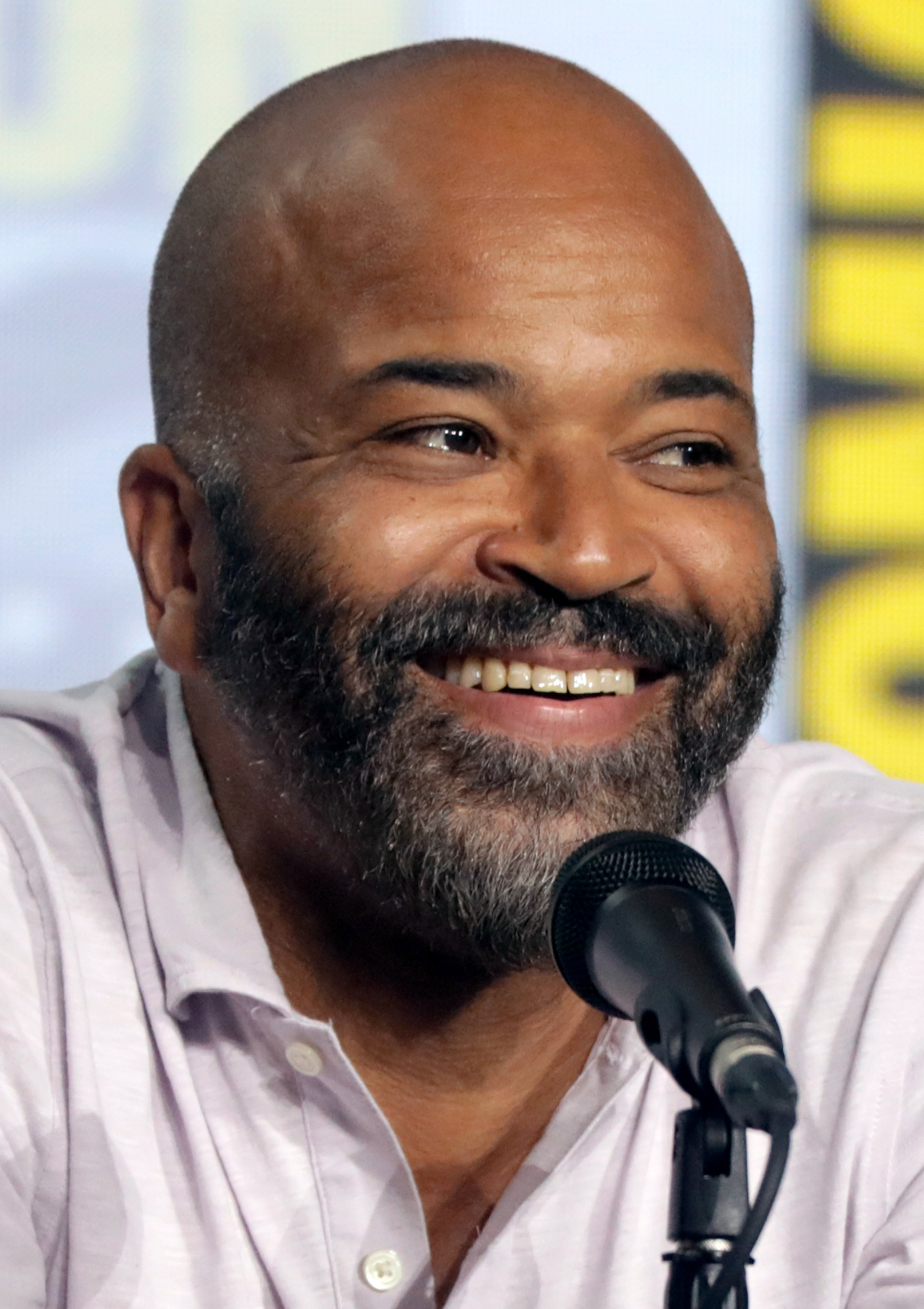
Jeffrey Wright, Best Guest Actor in a Drama Series winner

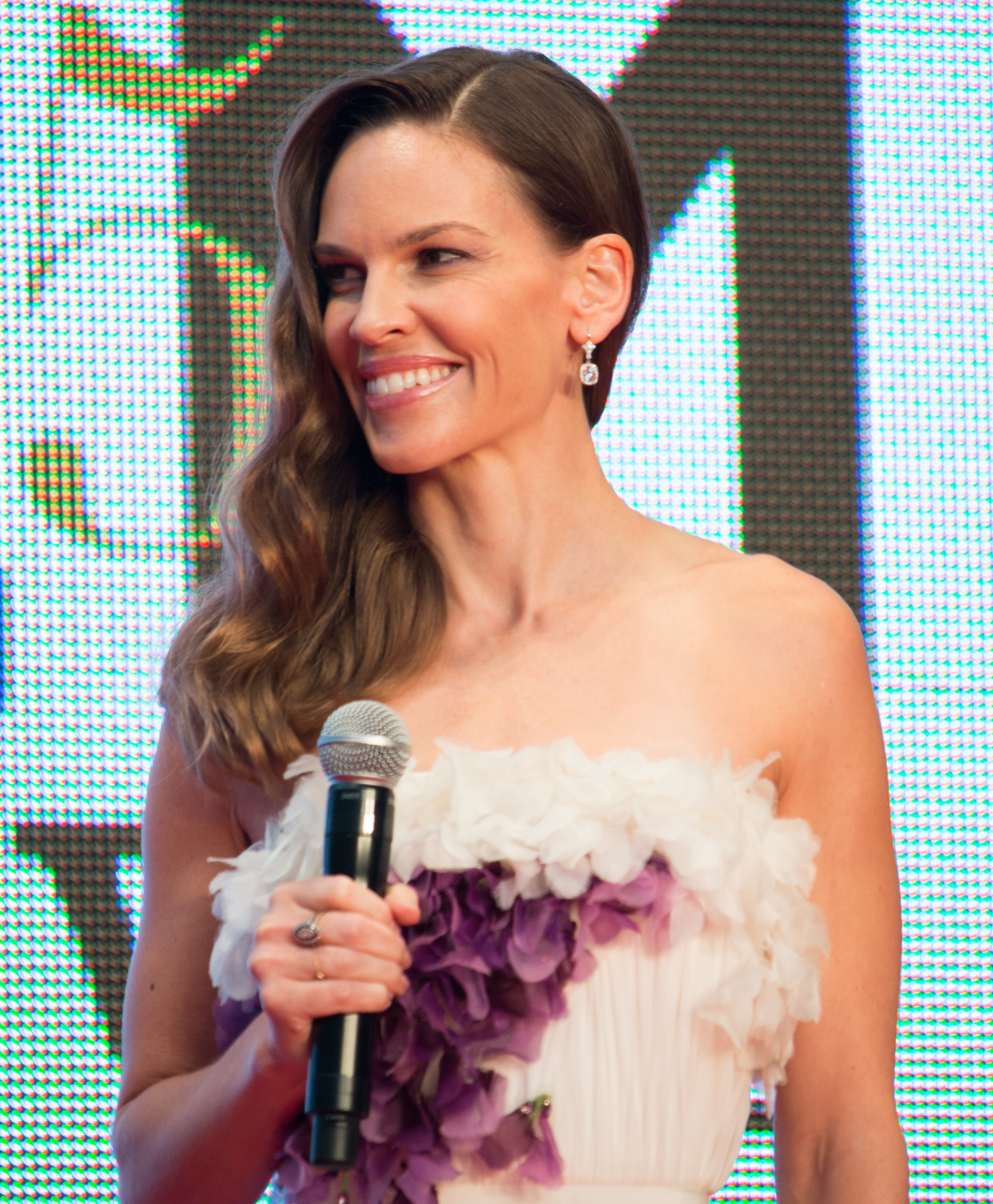
Hilary Swank, Best Guest Actress in a Drama Series winner

Winners are listed first and highlighted with boldface.

=== Programs ===
**Best Comedy Series**: **The Studio (Apple TV+)**; Abbott Elementary (ABC); Ghosts (CBS); Hacks (HBO Max); Nobody Wants This (Netflix); Only Murders in the Building (Hulu); Poker Face (Peacock); The Righteous Gemstones (HBO); Shrinking (Apple TV+); What We Do in the Shadows (FX)	**Best Drama Series**: **Severance (Apple TV+)**; Andor (Disney+); Bridgerton (Netflix); Daredevil: Born Again (Disney+); The Last of Us (HBO); Matlock (CBS); The Pitt (HBO Max); Slow Horses (Apple TV+); The White Lotus (HBO); Will Trent (ABC)
**Best Limited Series**: **Adolescence (Netflix)**; Black Mirror (Netflix); Dope Thief (Apple TV+); Dying for Sex (FX on Hulu); The Penguin (HBO); Presumed Innocent (Apple TV+)	**Best Television Movie**: **Rebel Ridge (Netflix)**; Another Simple Favor (Prime Video); Bridget Jones: Mad About the Boy (Peacock); G20 (Prime Video); The Gorge (Apple TV+); The Supremes at Earl's All-You-Can-Eat (Hulu)
**Best Animated Series**: **Invincible (Prime Video)**; Batman: Caped Crusader (Prime Video); Harley Quinn (HBO Max); Love, Death & Robots (Netflix); The Simpsons (Fox); Star Trek: Lower Decks (Paramount+)	**Best Anime Series**: **Dragon Ball Daima (Netflix)**; The Apothecary Diaries (Crunchyroll); Dandadan (Crunchyroll); Fire Force (Adult Swim); Lazarus (Adult Swim); Solo Leveling (Crunchyroll)
**Best Comedy or Standup Special**: **Brett Goldstein: The Second Best Night of Your Life (HBO)**; Adam Sandler: Love You (Netflix); Ali Wong: Single Lady (Netflix); Bill Burr: Drop Dead Years (Hulu); Hannah Einbinder: Everything Must Go (HBO); Iliza Shlesinger: A Different Animal (Prime Video); Jamie Foxx: What Had Happened Was... (Netflix); Roy Wood Jr.: Lonely Flowers (Hulu); Sarah Silverman: PostMortem (Netflix); Seth Meyers: Dad Man Walking (HBO)	**Best Game Show**: **The Floor (Fox)**; Are You Smarter than a Celebrity? (Prime Video); Celebrity Family Feud (ABC); Celebrity Jeopardy! (ABC); Celebrity Wheel of Fortune (ABC); Jeopardy! Masters (ABC)
**Best Documentary TV Movie**: **Will & Harper (Netflix)**; Beatles '64 (Disney+); I Am: Celine Dion (Prime Video); Megan Thee Stallion: In Her Words (Prime Video); Music by John Williams (Disney+); Number One on the Call Sheet (Apple TV+)	**Best Docuseries or Nonfiction Series**: **Pee-wee as Himself (HBO Max)**; Baylen Out Loud (TLC); Bad Influence: The Dark Side of Kidfluencing (Netflix); Conan O'Brien Must Go (HBO); Shelter Me: The Cancer Pioneers (PBS); Simone Biles Rising (Netflix)
**Best Reality Series**: **Love on the Spectrum (Netflix)**; Diners, Drive-Ins and Dives (Food Network); Love Is Blind (Netflix); The Secret Lives of Mormon Wives (Hulu); Selling Sunset (Netflix); Shark Tank (ABC)	**Best Reality Competition Series**: **The Traitors (Peacock)**; Beast Games (Prime Video); Dancing with the Stars (ABC); The Masked Singer (Fox); RuPaul's Drag Race (MTV); Top Chef (Bravo)
**Best Talk Show**: **The Daily Show (Comedy Central)**; Everybody's Live with John Mulaney (Netflix); Jimmy Kimmel Live! (ABC); My Next Guest Needs No Introduction with David Letterman (Netflix); The Late Show with Stephen Colbert (CBS); The Tonight Show Starring Jimmy Fallon (NBC)	**Best Variety Series or Special**: **Last Week Tonight with John Oliver (HBO)**; Beyoncé Bowl (Netflix); Ladies & Gentlemen... 50 Years of SNL Music (NBC); The Oscars (ABC); Saturday Night Live (NBC); Saturday Night Live 50th Anniversary Special (NBC)

=== Acting ===
==== Lead ====
**Best Actor in a Comedy Series**: **Seth Rogen – The Studio (Apple TV+) as Matt Remick**; Tim Allen – Shifting Gears (ABC) as Matt Parker; Utkarsh Ambudkar – Ghosts (CBS) as Jay Arondekar; Matt Berry – What We Do in the Shadows (FX) as Leslie "Laszlo" Cravensworth; Adam Brody – Nobody Wants This (Netflix) as Noah Roklov; John Goodman – The Conners (ABC) as Dan Conner; Steve Martin – Only Murders in the Building (Hulu) as Charles-Haden Savage; Jason Segel – Shrinking (Apple TV+) as Jimmy Laird; Martin Short – Only Murders in the Building (Hulu) as Oliver Putnam; Jeremy Allen White – The Bear (FX on Hulu) as Carmen "Carmy" Berzatto	**Best Actress in a Comedy Series**: **Natasha Lyonne – Poker Face (Peacock) as Charlie Cale**; Kristen Bell – Nobody Wants This (Netflix) as Joanne; Quinta Brunson – Abbott Elementary (ABC) as Janine Teagues; Natasia Demetriou – What We Do in the Shadows (FX) as Nadja of Antipaxos; Kat Dennings – Shifting Gears (ABC) as Riley Parker; Ayo Edebiri – The Bear (FX on Hulu) as Sydney Adamu; Selena Gomez – Only Murders in the Building (Hulu) as Mabel Mora; Kathryn Hahn – Agatha All Along (Disney+) as Agatha Harkness; Rose McIver – Ghosts (CBS) as Samantha "Sam" Arondekar; Jean Smart – Hacks (HBO Max) as Deborah Vance
**Best Actor in a Drama Series**: **Noah Wyle – The Pitt (HBO Max) as Dr. Michael "Robby" Robinavitch**; Jacob Anderson – Interview with the Vampire (AMC) as Louis de Pointe du Lac; Sterling K. Brown – Paradise (Hulu) as Xavier Collins; Charlie Cox – Daredevil: Born Again (Disney+) as Matthew "Matt" Murdock / Daredevil; Joshua Jackson – Doctor Odyssey (ABC) as Dr. Max Bankman; Gary Oldman – Slow Horses (Apple TV+) as Jackson Lamb; Pedro Pascal – The Last of Us (HBO) as Joel Miller; Eddie Redmayne – The Day of the Jackal (Peacock) as Alexander Duggan / The Jackal; Ramón Rodríguez – Will Trent (ABC) as Will Trent; Adam Scott – Severance (Apple TV+) as Mark S. / Mark Scout	**Best Actress in a Drama Series**: **Kathy Bates – Matlock (CBS) as Madeline "Matty" Matlock / Madeline Kingston**; Angela Bassett – 9-1-1 (ABC) as Athena Grant-Nash; Nicola Coughlan – Bridgerton (Netflix) as Penelope Featherington; Britt Lower – Severance (Apple TV+) as Helly R. / Helena Eagan; Melanie Lynskey – Yellowjackets (Showtime) as Shauna Sadecki; Elisabeth Moss – The Handmaid's Tale (Hulu) as June Osborne; Kaitlin Olson – High Potential (ABC) as Morgan Gillory; Carrie Preston – Elsbeth (CBS) as Elsbeth Tascioni; Bella Ramsey – The Last of Us (HBO) as Ellie Williams; Keri Russell – The Diplomat (Netflix) as Katherine "Kate" Wyler
**Best Actor in a Limited Series or TV Movie**: **Colin Farrell – The Penguin (HBO) as Oswald "Oz" Cobb / The Penguin**; Stephen Graham – Adolescence (Netflix) as Eddie Miller; Jake Gyllenhaal – Presumed Innocent (Apple TV+) as Rusty Sabich; Brian Tyree Henry – Dope Thief (Apple TV+) as Ray Driscoll; Aaron Pierre – Rebel Ridge (Netflix) as Terry Richmond; Miles Teller – The Gorge (Apple TV+) as Levi Kane	**Best Actress in a Limited Series or TV Movie**: **Cristin Milioti – The Penguin (HBO) as Sofia Falcone / Sofia Gigante / The Hangman**; Kaitlyn Dever – Apple Cider Vinegar (Netflix) as Belle Gibson; Amanda Seyfried – Long Bright River (Peacock) as Mickey Fitzpatrick; Anya Taylor-Joy – The Gorge (Apple TV+) as Drasa; Michelle Williams – Dying for Sex (FX on Hulu) as Molly Kochan; Renée Zellweger – Bridget Jones: Mad About the Boy (Peacock) as Bridget Jones
**Best Lead Voice-Over Performance**: **Aleks Le – Solo Leveling (Crunchyroll) as Sung Jin-woo**; Alex Borstein – Family Guy: Holiday Special (Fox) as Lois Griffin; Johnny Yong Bosch – Devil May Cry (Netflix) as Dante; Kaley Cuoco – Harley Quinn (HBO Max) as Harley Quinn; Seth MacFarlane – Family Guy: Holiday Special (Fox) as Peter Griffin / Brian Griffin / Stewie Griffin; Stephanie Nadolny – Dragon Ball Daima (Netflix) as Son Goku

==== Supporting ====
**Best Supporting Actor in a Comedy Series**: **Harrison Ford – Shrinking (Apple TV+) as Paul Rhoades**; Ike Barinholtz – The Studio (Apple TV+) as Sal Saperstein; Paul W. Downs – Hacks (HBO Max) as Jimmy LuSaque Jr.; Walton Goggins – The Righteous Gemstones (HBO) as Baby Billy Freeman; Brett Goldstein – Shrinking (Apple TV+) as Louis Winston; Asher Grodman – Ghosts (CBS) as Trevor Lefkowitz; Ebon Moss-Bachrach – The Bear (FX on Hulu) as Richie Jerimovich; Michael Urie – Shrinking (Apple TV+) as Brian; Tyler James Williams – Abbott Elementary (ABC) as Gregory Eddie; Román Zaragoza – Ghosts (CBS) as Sasappis	**Best Supporting Actress in a Comedy Series**: **Catherine O'Hara – The Studio (Apple TV+) as Patty Leigh**; Sheila Carrasco – Ghosts (CBS) as Susan "Flower" Montero; Liza Colón-Zayas – The Bear (FX on Hulu) as Tina Marrero; Hannah Einbinder – Hacks (HBO Max) as Ava Daniels; Janelle James – Abbott Elementary (ABC) as Ava Coleman; Edi Patterson – The Righteous Gemstones (HBO) as Judy Gemstone; Sheryl Lee Ralph – Abbott Elementary (ABC) as Barbara Howard; Megan Stalter – Hacks (HBO Max) as Kayla Schaeffer; Jessica Williams – Shrinking (Apple TV+) as Gaby Evans; Chase Sui Wonders – The Studio (Apple TV+) as Quinn Hackett
**Best Supporting Actor in a Drama Series**: **Walton Goggins – The White Lotus (HBO) as Rick Hatchett**; Vincent D'Onofrio – Daredevil: Born Again (Disney+) as Wilson Fisk / Kingpin; Jason Isaacs – The White Lotus (HBO) as Timothy Raitliff; James Marsden – Paradise (Hulu) as President Cal Bradford; Sam Reid – Interview with the Vampire (AMC) as Lestat de Lioncourt; Jason Ritter – Matlock (CBS) as Julian Markston; Sam Rockwell – The White Lotus (HBO) as Frank; Daniel Sunjata – High Potential (ABC) as Adam Karadec; Tramell Tillman – Severance (Apple TV+) as Seth Milchick / Mr. Milchick; John Turturro – Severance (Apple TV+) as Irving B. / Irving Bailiff	**Best Supporting Actress in a Drama Series**: **Isabela Merced – The Last of Us (HBO) as Dina**; Carrie Coon – The White Lotus (HBO) as Laurie Duffy; Taylor Dearden – The Pitt (HBO Max) as Dr. Melissa "Mel" King; Jennifer Love Hewitt – 9-1-1 (Fox) as Maddie Han; Allison Janney – The Diplomat (Netflix) as Vice President Grace Penn; Dichen Lachman – Severance (Apple TV+) as Gemma Scout / Ms. Casey; Skye P. Marshall – Matlock (CBS) as Olympia Lawrence; Julianne Nicholson – Paradise (Hulu) as Samantha "Sinatra" Redmond; Parker Posey – The White Lotus (HBO) as Victoria Raitliff; Aimee Lou Wood – The White Lotus (HBO) as Chelsea
**Best Supporting Actor in a Limited Series or TV Movie**: **Owen Cooper – Adolescence (Netflix) as Jamie Miller**; Javier Bardem – Monsters: The Lyle and Erik Menendez Story (Netflix) as José Menendez; Clancy Brown – The Penguin (HBO) as Salvatore Maroni; Hugh Grant – Bridget Jones: Mad About the Boy (Peacock) as Daniel Cleaver; Dan Stevens – Zero Day (Netflix) as Evan Green; Ashley Walters – Adolescence (Netflix) as DI Luke Bascombe	**Best Supporting Actress in a Limited Series or TV Movie**: **Cristin Milioti – Black Mirror (Netflix) as Nanette Cole**; Erin Doherty – Adolescence (Netflix) as Briony Ariston; Ruth Negga – Presumed Innocent (Apple TV+) as Barbara Sabich; Deirdre O'Connell – The Penguin (HBO) as Francis Cobb; AnnaSophia Robb – Rebel Ridge (Netflix) as Summer McBride; Jenny Slate – Dying for Sex (FX on Hulu) as Nikki Boyer
**Best Supporting Voice-Over Performance**: **Jack Quaid – Star Trek: Lower Decks (Paramount+) as Brad Boimler**; Justin Briner – Solo Leveling (Crunchyroll) as Yoo Jin-ho; Jamie Chung – Batman: Caped Crusader (Prime Video) as Dr. Harleen Quinzel / Harley Quinn; Caitlin Glass – One Piece (Crunchyroll) as Nefertari Vivi; Xolo Maridueña – Sakamoto Days (Netflix) as Heisuke Mashimo; J. K. Simmons – Invincible (Prime Video) as Omni-Man

==== Guest ====
**Best Guest Actor in a Comedy Series**: **Jon Bernthal – The Bear (FX on Hulu) as Mikey Berzatto**; John Cena – The Bear (FX on Hulu) as Sammy Fak; Timothée Chalamet – Saturday Night Live (NBC) as Himself; Bradley Cooper – Abbott Elementary (ABC) as Himself; Bradley Cooper – The Righteous Gemstones (HBO) as Elijah Gemstone; Ron Howard – The Studio (Apple TV+) as Himself; Christopher McDonald – Hacks (HBO Max) as Marty Ghilain; Martin Scorsese – The Studio (Apple TV+) as Himself; Adam Scott – The Studio (Apple TV+) as Himself; Martin Short – Saturday Night Live (NBC) as Himself	**Best Guest Actress in a Comedy Series**: **Cynthia Erivo – Poker Face (Peacock) as The Kazinsky Sisters**; Quinta Brunson – Saturday Night Live (NBC) as Herself; Jamie Lee Curtis – The Bear (FX on Hulu) as Donna Berzatto; Ariana Grande – Saturday Night Live (NBC) as Herself; Mary Holland – Ghosts (CBS) as Patience; Zoë Kravitz – The Studio (Apple TV+) as Herself; Melissa McCarthy – Only Murders in the Building (Hulu) as Doreen; Kaitlin Olson – Abbott Elementary (ABC) as Deandra "Dee" Reynolds; Kaitlin Olson – Hacks (HBO Max) as Deborah "DJ" Vance Jr.; Sarah Polley – The Studio (Apple TV+) as Herself
**Best Guest Actor in a Drama Series**: **Jeffrey Wright – The Last of Us (HBO) as Isaac Dixon**; Scott Glenn – The White Lotus (HBO) as Jim Hollinger; Gong Yoo – Squid Game (Netflix) as The Recruiter / The Salesman; Cheyenne Jackson – Doctor Odyssey (ABC) as Bryan; Joel McHale – Yellowjackets (Showtime) as Kodiak; John Noble – Severance (Apple TV+) as Fields; Joe Pantoliano – The Last of Us (HBO) as Eugene Lynden; Danny Ramirez – The Last of Us (HBO) as Manny; Ethan Slater – Elsbeth (CBS) as Reese Chandler; Yul Vazquez – Will Trent (ABC) as Sheriff Caleb Roussard	**Best Guest Actress in a Drama Series**: **Hilary Swank – Yellowjackets (Showtime) as Jenna Burgess**; Angela Bassett – Doctor Odyssey (ABC) as Athena Grant-Nash; D'Arcy Carden – The Handmaid's Tale (Hulu) as Ava / Aunt Phoebe; Gwendoline Christie – Severance (Apple TV+) as Lorne; Kaitlyn Dever – The Last of Us (HBO) as Abby; Catherine O'Hara – The Last of Us (HBO) as Gail; Mary-Louise Parker – Elsbeth (CBS) as Freya Frostad; Alanna Ubach – The Last of Us (HBO) as Hanrahan; Tracey Ullman – Black Doves (Netflix) as Alex Clark; Merritt Wever – Severance (Apple TV+) as Gretchen George

==== Cast Ensemble ====
**Best Cast Ensemble in a Broadcast Network Comedy Series**: **Ghosts (CBS)**; Abbott Elementary (ABC); Animal Control (Fox); The Neighborhood (CBS); Shifting Gears (ABC); St. Denis Medical (NBC)	**Best Cast Ensemble in a Cable Comedy Series**: **The Righteous Gemstones (HBO)**; English Teacher (FX); Somebody Somewhere (HBO); What We Do in the Shadows (FX)
**Best Cast Ensemble in a Streaming Comedy Series**: **Shrinking (Apple TV+)**; Agatha All Along (Disney+); The Bear (FX on Hulu); Cobra Kai (Netflix); Hacks (HBO Max); Mid-Century Modern (Hulu); Nobody Wants This (Netflix); Only Murders in the Building (Hulu); Poker Face (Peacock); The Studio (Apple TV+)	**Best Cast Ensemble in a Broadcast Network Drama Series**: **Matlock (CBS)**; 9-1-1 (Fox); The Cleaning Lady (Fox); Elsbeth (CBS); High Potential (ABC); Will Trent (ABC)
**Best Cast Ensemble in a Cable Drama Series**: **The White Lotus (HBO)**; House of the Dragon (HBO); Industry (HBO); Interview with the Vampire (AMC); The Last of Us (HBO); Outlander (Starz)	**Best Cast Ensemble in a Streaming Drama Series**: **The Pitt (HBO Max)**; Andor (Disney+); The Boys (Prime Video); Bridgerton (Netflix); The Handmaid's Tale (Hulu); Landman (Paramount+); The Lord of the Rings: The Rings of Power (Prime Video); Paradise (Hulu); Severance (Apple TV+); Yellowjackets (Showtime)
**Best Cast Ensemble in a Limited Series or TV Movie**: **The Penguin (HBO)**; Adolescence (Netflix); Black Mirror (Netflix); Bridget Jones: Mad About the Boy (Peacock); Dying for Sex (FX on Hulu); G20 (Prime Video)

=== Directing ===
**Best Directing in a Comedy Series**: **The Studio: "The Oner" – Seth Rogen and Evan Goldberg (Apple TV+)**; Abbott Elementary: "Rally" – Claire Scanlon (ABC); The Bear: "Napkins" – Ayo Edebiri (FX on Hulu); Ghosts: "Ghostfellas" – Rose McIver (CBS); Hacks: "A Slippery Slope" – Lucia Aniello (HBO Max); Only Murders in the Building: "My Best Friend's Wedding" – Jamie Babbit (Hulu); Poker Face: "Last Looks" – Natasha Lyonne (Peacock); The Righteous Gemstones: "Prelude" – Danny McBride (HBO); Shrinking: "The Last Thanksgiving" – Bill Lawrence (Apple TV+); What We Do in the Shadows: "The Finale" – Yana Gorskaya (FX)	**Best Directing in a Drama Series**: **Will Trent: "I'm a Guest Here" – Ramón Rodríguez (ABC)**; Andor: "One Year Later" – Ariel Kleiman (Disney+); The Last of Us: "Through the Valley" – Mark Mylod (HBO); Matlock: "I Was That, Too" – Hanelle Culpepper (CBS); The Pitt: "7:00 A.M." – John Wells (HBO Max); Severance: "Chikhai Bardo" – Jessica Lee Gagné (Apple TV+); Severance: "Cold Harbor" – Ben Stiller (Apple TV+); Squid Game: "Friend or Foe" – Hwang Dong-hyuk (Netflix); The White Lotus: "Full-Moon Party" – Mike White (HBO); Yellowjackets: "Croak" – Jennifer Morrison (Showtime)
**Best Directing in a Limited Series or TV Movie**: **Adolescence: "Episode 3" – Philip Barantini (Netflix)**; Black Mirror: "Eulogy" – Chris Barrett and Luke Taylor (Netflix); The Gorge – Scott Derrickson (Apple TV+); Monsters: The Lyle and Erik Menendez Story: "The Hurt Man" – Michael Uppendahl (Netflix); The Penguin: "Cent'Anni" – Helen Shaver (HBO); Rebel Ridge – Jeremy Saulnier (Netflix)

=== Writing ===
**Best Writing in a Comedy Series**: **Hacks: "A Slippery Slope" – Lucia Aniello, Paul W. Downs, and Jen Statsky (HBO Max)**; Abbott Elementary: "Back to School" – Quinta Brunson (ABC); The Bear: "Napkins" – Catherine Schetina and Christopher Storer (FX on Hulu); Ghosts: "Pinkus Returns" – Skander Halim and Talia Bernstein (CBS); Nobody Wants This: "My Girl Bina" – Barbie Adler and Niki Schwartz-Wright (Netflix); Only Murders in the Building: "My Best Friend's Wedding" – John Hoffman and J. J. Philbin (Hulu); Shrinking: "The Last Thanksgiving" – Neil Goldman, Bill Lawrence, and Brett Goldstein (Apple TV+); Somebody Somewhere: "AGG" – Hannah Bos, Paul Thureen, and Bridget Everett (HBO); The Studio: "The Golden Globes" – Alex Gregory (Apple TV+); The Studio: "The Promotion" – Seth Rogen, Evan Goldberg, Peter Huyck, Alex Gregory, and Frida Perez (Apple TV+)	**Best Writing in a Drama Series**: **The Pitt: "7:00 P.M." – Joe Sachs and R. Scott Gemmill (HBO Max)**; Andor: "One Year Later" – Tony Gilroy (Disney+); The Diplomat: "Dreadnaught" – Debora Cahn (Netflix); High Potential: "Pilot" – Drew Goddard, Nicolas Jean, and Stéphane Carrié (ABC); The Last of Us: "Through the Valley" – Craig Mazin (HBO); Matlock: "Pilot" – Jennie Snyder Urman (CBS); Severance: "Cold Harbor" – Dan Erickson (Apple TV+); Slow Horses: "Hello, Goodbye" – Will Smith (Apple TV+); The White Lotus: "Full-Moon Party" – Mike White (HBO); Will Trent: "Best of Your Recollection" – Rebecca Murga (ABC)
**Best Writing in a Limited Series or TV Movie**: **Adolescence: "Episode 3" – Jack Thorne and Stephen Graham (Netflix)**; Black Mirror: "Eulogy" – Ella Road and Charlie Brooker (Netflix); Dying for Sex: "It's Not That Serious" – Shannon Murphy, Kim Rosenstock, and Elizabeth Meriwether (FX on Hulu); Monsters: The Lyle and Erik Menendez Story: "The Hurt Man" – Ian Brennan (Netflix); The Penguin: "A Great or Little Thing" – Lauren LeFranc (HBO); Rebel Ridge – Jeremy Saulnier (Netflix)

== Honorary Awards ==
- Trailblazer Award – Olivia Munn
- Petco Love Award – Maggie Lawson
- Actor Spotlight Award – David Alan Grier
- Actress Spotlight Award – Melissa Rauch
- Director Spotlight Award – Jennifer Morrison
- Breakthrough Actor Spotlight Award – Saagar Shaikh
- Breakthrough Actress Spotlight Award – Courtney Eaton

== Most wins ==
Wins by series
Wins	Series
4	Adolescence
4	The Studio
3	The Penguin
3	The Pitt
2	The Last of Us
2	Matlock
2	Poker Face
2	Shrinking
2	The White Lotus

== Most nominations ==
Nominations by series
Nominations	Series
14	The Studio
13	The Last of Us
13	Severance
11	The White Lotus
10	Abbott Elementary
10	The Bear
10	Ghosts
10	Hacks
9	Shrinking
8	Adolescence
8	Only Murders in the Building
8	The Penguin
7	Matlock
6	The Pitt
6	The Righteous Gemstones
6	Will Trent
5	Black Mirror
5	Dying for Sex
5	Nobody Wants This
5	Poker Face
5	Rebel Ridge
5	Saturday Night Live
5	What We Do in the Shadows
5	Yellowjackets
4	Andor
4	Bridget Jones: Mad About the Boy
4	Elsbeth
4	The Gorge
4	High Potential
4	Paradise
3	9-1-1
3	Bridgerton
3	Daredevil: Born Again
3	The Diplomat
3	Doctor Odyssey
3	The Handmaid's Tale
3	Interview with the Vampire
3	Monsters: The Lyle and Erik Menendez Story
3	Presumed Innocent
3	Shifting Gears
3	Slow Horses
2	Agatha All Along
2	Batman: Caped Crusader
2	Dope Thief
2	G20
2	Harley Quinn
2	Invincible
2	Somebody Somewhere
2	Squid Game
2	Star Trek: Lower Decks
