= Same Difference (disambiguation) =

Same Difference were a British bubblegum pop duo.

Same Difference may also refer to:

- Same Difference (Entombed album), 1998
- Same Difference (Swae Lee album), 2026
- The Same Difference, a 2015 American documentary film
- Same Difference and Other Stories, a graphic novel by Derek Kirk Kim
