= Dying for Sex (podcast) =

2020 podcast by Molly Kochan and Nikki Boyer

- Language: English

Cast and voices
- Hosted by: Molly Kochan; Nikki Boyer

Technical specifications
- Audio format: MP3

Publication
- Original release: February 12 – March 11, 2020
- Provider: Wondery

Related
- Website: wondery.com/shows/dying-for-sex/

Dying for Sex is a podcast presented by Molly Kochan and Nikki Boyer. Broadcast in early 2020, it features Kochan debriefing her sex life and her terminal cancer journey, and was broadcast after her death. The series won numerous awards including Podcast of the Year at the 2021 Ambies and was adapted for the 2025 television series Dying for Sex.

== History ==
Molly Kochan was diagnosed with Stage IV cancer in 2015 and responded by having cybersex with people on the internet; she left her husband the following year and began having large numbers of sexual liaisons with strangers. In 2018, having already been on two dates that day, Kochan met with Boyer for lunch, where they developed the idea for a podcast depicting her experiences, with the intent that subsequent series would deal with her cancer and childhood trauma and Boyer's IVF. The pair pitched it to television executives, who did not understand it or how to promote it; the pair then made ten episodes themselves across three recording sessions, which addressed nearly 200 of her encounters but did not give Molly's last name.

Production was affected several times by Kochan's failing health; some recording sessions had to be canceled because Kochan could not get up from her bathroom floor, part of episode four was recorded in a hospital as Kochan was receiving treatment for thrombi, and her voice became weaker and raspier towards the end of the series. The original plan had been for Boyer to upload the ten episodes to YouTube; however, after Kochan was hospitalized and it became apparent that she would not leave the hospital, Kochan and Boyer decided to keep recording from Kochan's hospital bed, and the final recordings were made while she was in hospice care on Boyer's phone. After she emailed Hernan Lopez, the then-CEO of Wondery, and then emailed him again, his firm agreed to publish the series themselves. Lopez himself visited Kochan to sign contracts for the series on Valentine's Day 2019; Kochan died shortly afterwards on March 8.

Wondery boiled the podcast down to six episodes, which were published between February and March 2020. Dying for Sex comprised the original ten episodes, Boyer's hospital recordings, Kochan's memoir Screw Cancer: Becoming Whole, and ruminations and journalism conducted by Boyer after Kochan's death. The podcast was listed as one of Apple's Favorite Podcasts of 2020, won Podcast of the Year at the 2021 Ambies, and appeared on multiple "best sex/relationship" podcast listicles. In November 2023, it was announced that the podcast would be serialized for a television series; the show was released on April 4, 2025, and was loosely based on Kochan's experiences.
