= Nneka Onuorah =

American director and producer (born 1988)

- Born: 1988 (age 37–38); Queens, New York, U.S.
- Occupations: Director, producer
- Years active: 2009—present
- Notable work: The Same Difference; Lizzo's Watch Out for the Big Grrrls; The Legend of the Underground; Megan Thee Stallion: In Her Words
- Website: www.nnekafilms.com

Nneka Onuorah (born 1988) is an American director and producer. She is best known for her directorial debut, The Same Difference (2015), about gender roles in the Black lesbian community. She received a 2022 Primetime Emmy Award for Outstanding Directing for a Reality Program for her work on Lizzo's Watch Out for the Big Grrrls.

== Early life and education ==
Onuorah was born in Queens, New York and raised in the LeFrak City neighborhood. Her father is Nigerian and her mother is African-American. She moved to Atlanta to live with her grandmother in fifth grade and moved back to Queens for high school. She studied dance at Broadway Dance Center, and later received her associate degree in psychology from LaGuardia Community College.

== Career ==
In 2009, Onuorah did an internship at BET, and she was subsequently hired as a producer. She worked on Black Girls Rock! and various music documentaries. After six years, Onuorah left the network to work on her first film, The Same Difference. She launched a Kickstarter campaign to fund the film, a documentary about strict behavioral roles for studs and femmes in Black lesbian communities. Her stated inspiration to produce the documentary was the dearth of representations of Black LGBTQIA people in mainstream media. She has spoken about experiencing backlash from other lesbians when she chose to dress feminine rather than her usual masculine of center presentation. Onuorah failed to reach her fundraising goal and instead independently financed the film. The Same Difference premiered in June 2015.

She directed the Netflix series First and Last and produced My House, a Viceland series about New York's Black and Latinx ballroom community. She attended balls during adolescence and walked in the Butch category.

In 2019, Onuorah and co-director/co-producer Giselle Bailey released a documentary called Burn Down the House about Parisian dancer Kiddy Smile, which premiered at NewFest LGBTQ Film Festival.

In 2021, Onuorah and Bailey directed and produced the documentary The Legend of the Underground, about the Nigerian LGBTQ community and its members who have left the country seeking asylum due to anti-LGBTQ laws.

In 2022, Onuorah directed the eight-episode Amazon Prime Video reality series Lizzo's Watch Out for the Big Grrrls. The show, hosted and developed by singer-songwriter Lizzo features plus-size dancers competing to join Lizzo's touring dance group, the Big Grrrls. The show focuses on support, positivity and development of the dancers' inner strength and potential as well as mastering choreography quickly. Onuorah won a Primetime Emmy Award for Outstanding Directing for a Reality Program for her work on the series.

She directed and produced Megan Thee Stallion's 2024 documentary Megan Thee Stallion: In Her Words.

== Personal life ==
Onuorah is a lesbian. She began to identify as a lesbian at age 14. She was raised Christian.
