= The Legend of the Underground =

2021 film by Nneka Onuorah and Giselle Bailey

- Official poster
- Directed by: Nneka Onuorah; Giselle Bailey
- Produced by: Giselle Bailey; Nneka Onourah; Stephen Bailey
- Cinematography: Stephen Bailey
- Edited by: Rabab Haj Yahya
- Production companies: HBO Documentary Films; Get Lifted Film Company; Nala Films
- Distributed by: HBO
- Release dates: June 10, 2021 (Tribeca); June 29, 2021 (United States)
- Running time: 100 minutes
- Countries: United States; Nigeria
- Language: English

The Legend of the Underground is a 2021 American documentary film, directed and produced by Nneka Onuorah and Giselle Bailey. John Legend served as an executive producer under his Get Lifted Film Company banner. It follows several LGBTQ+ and gender non-conforming youth in Nigeria as they deal with discrimination and make decisions about their lives.

The film had its world premiere at the Tribeca Film Festival on June 10, 2021. It was released on June 29, 2021, by HBO.

== Synopsis ==
Several non-conformist youth in Nigeria fight rampant discrimination as they decide whether to stay or flee to live elsewhere in another country. They challenge the ideals of gender, conformity and civil rights in Nigeria.

== Release ==
The film had its world premiere at the Tribeca Film Festival on June 10, 2021. It was released on June 29, 2021.

== Critical reception ==
The Legend of the Underground holds a 100% approval rating on review aggregator website Rotten Tomatoes, based on 8 reviews, with a weighted average of 7.90/10. Reviewers included the New York Times, Vogue, and the Washington Blade.

=== Accolades ===
Year	Award	Category	Recipient(s)	Result	Ref.
2022	GLAAD Media Awards	Outstanding Documentary	The Legend of the Underground	Nominated	
