= Jayla Sullivan =

American dancer and television personality

Jayla Rose Sullivan is an American dancer, burlesque and drag performer, transgender rights advocate, and television personality. She was a contestant on the 2022 American reality television dance competition show Lizzo's Watch Out for the Big Grrrls.

== Biography ==
Sullivan was born in Buffalo, New York and moved to Portland, Oregon in 2011. She trained in gymnastics, tap dance, jazz dance, modern dance, and ballet.

Sullivan performs as a drag queen and burlesque dancer at Hamburger Mary's, Bit House Saloon, Sinferno Cabaret, and at drag brunches around Portland. She was hired by boylesque performer Isaiah Esquire to dance at CC Slaughters and in the cabaret show BOYeurism.

Sullivan competed on the American television reality series Lizzo's Watch Out for the Big Grrrls (WOBG), an eight episode unscripted series that followed ten women competing to earn a spot as a backup dancer for Lizzo. After the airing of the show, she accompanied Lizzo, along with the other dancers, to South by Southwest. Sullivan took the stage with Lizzo during the 48th People's Choice Awards and was recognized for her work "making sure there’s space for transgender and nonbinary performers in the dance community". She won an Emmy Award for WOBG. In 2023, Sullivan introduced Lizzo at the Grammy Awards.

Sullivan has performed as part of Lizzo's Big Grrrls Squad at Global Citizen Festival, Art Basel Miami, the Oregon Museum of Science and Industry, and Treasure Island Resort & Casino.
