= Dying for Sex =

2025 American television miniseries

- Genre: Comedy drama
- Created by: Kim Rosenstock; Elizabeth Meriwether
- Based on: Dying for Sex by Molly Kochan and Nikki Boyer
- Showrunners: Kim Rosenstock; Elizabeth Meriwether
- Directed by: Shannon Murphy; Chris Teague
- Starring: Michelle Williams; Jenny Slate
- Music by: Ariel Marx
- Country of origin: United States
- Original language: English
- No. of episodes: 8

Production
- Executive producers: Elizabeth Meriwether; Kim Rosenstock; Katherine Pope; Kathy Ciric; Hernan Lopez; Jen Sargent; Marshall Lewy; Aaron Hart; Michelle Williams; Nikki Boyer; Shannon Murphy; Leslye Headland
- Producers: Chris Teague; Christina M. Fitzgerald
- Running time: 27-35 minutes
- Production companies: Pasta with Sauce; Elizabeth Meriwether Pictures; Wondery; 20th Television

Original release
- Network: FX on Hulu
- Release: April 4, 2025

Dying for Sex is an American comedy drama miniseries. Based loosely on the real-life experiences of Molly Kochan and written by Liz Meriwether and Kim Rosenstock, the show depicts Molly being diagnosed with terminal cancer and leaving her husband in search of an orgasm. The series stars Michelle Williams and Jenny Slate, with recurring featured appearances from Rob Delaney, David Rasche, Esco Jouléy, Jay Duplass, Kelvin Yu, Sissy Spacek, and Zack Robidas. Broadcast on April 4, 2025, on Hulu and Disney+, the show made the top-10 most streamed series in the U.S. from March 31 to April 6 and received largely positive critical reception.

At the 77th Primetime Emmy Awards, the miniseries received nine nominations, including for Outstanding Limited or Anthology Series and acting nominations for Williams, Slate, and Delaney.

== Plot ==
Molly starts the series ten years into an unhappy marriage with her husband, Steve, a pompous journalist; she is also inhibited by the traumatic effects of her mother's boyfriend forcing oral sex from her at the age of seven. Her doctor calls her during a couple's therapy session with Steve to say that a biopsy they took on her hip shows stage IV metastatic breast cancer that has infiltrated her bones, brain, and liver; she responds by leaving the therapy session to buy a two-liter bottle of white-label diet soda and menthol cigarettes at a bodega across the street. She calls her friend Nikki, who is overwhelmed by the news. Her hormonal anti-cancer drug tamoxifen increases her libido, and Molly attempts to give her husband fellatio in their kitchen, only for him to start crying as her breasts remind him of her death. At the hospital, she tells counselor Sonya that she has never had an orgasm with another person, and their conversation inspires Molly to leave Steve and explore her sexuality.

In the second episode, Molly signs up for a dating app and is pleased to receive multiple dick pics. At a subsequent hospital visit, she is told the doctors will induce menopause. On her way out, she invites an app user to a hotel, but backs out after seeing him; she then does the same for a guy in an elevator, but rescinds the invitation after opting not to risk having to explain her mastectomy scars. Later, she orders a vibrator and orgasms to Keanu Reeves and Sandra Bullock in Speed, to a clownfish entering and exiting a coral reef, and in front of a male webcam model, the last of which infects Nikki's laptop with viruses. She then throws her overheating vibrator into an ice bucket. The man promptly blackmails her, prompting her to call Nikki and then Steve; the latter shames Molly, prompting her to gather her possessions and leave him immediately, and later move in with Nikki. Steve hands Molly's medical records to Nikki, who promptly loses them.

While debriefing with Nikki at a bar, she leaves in an Uber with a patron, who prematurely ejaculates on their way to have sex; the driver dumps them at a highway divider. Having attended a stage IV cancer group in episode three, she visits a group for those with curable cancer but is ejected to avoid disconcerting its members. Following an abortive encounter with an inexperienced 25-year-old, Molly starts masturbating and hears her neighbor also doing so; aroused at the thought that he is doing so to her, she orgasms. The pair subsequently run into each other while he's emptying his trash in the hallway; she orders him to pick it up, moves both of them to run to their rooms and masturbate, and denies him permission to ejaculate. Molly later enters his apartment and orders him to masturbate. At his request, she kicks him in the penis, and the movement causes her femur to snap. Molly begins searching for submissive males online, and finds Hooper, a successful Wall Street trader into penis humiliation and penis cages; she tries to mock his penis but struggles as she considers it beautiful.

At Sonya's suggestion, Molly and Nikki attend a "kink-forward, play-party potluck", where Molly witnesses Sonya's ex, G, slowly instructing a woman to masturbate on a table. Impressed, Molly visits G at her workplace, where G tells Molly to attempt submission before attempting dominance; following an abortive attempt at the latter with the finance bro, Molly submits to G in the back room of her home goods store. That afternoon, she returns to hospital, where she asserts her wants and needs with her doctor, and explores her relationship with Neighbor Guy. She then conquers a man who has a kink for pup play and checks him for ticks. In episode five, Nikki is unavailable due to anaesthesia from dental surgery, so Molly is taken to the hospital by her mother Gail, a recovering addict who brings uninvited guests; Molly also sees Steve and his girlfriend. Nikki does not reply to Molly's texts, so she instead invites her pup player to snuggle with her for shock value. Nikki breaks up with her boyfriend Noah after he switches off her phone post-surgery.

At home, Molly attempts to urinate on her pet, but is interrupted by her mother, and neither can remove Molly's pet's collar; Molly calls Neighbor Guy, and Gail tells him about Molly's cancer. After Gail leaves, Molly and Neighbor Guy discuss her condition and his past, and she resumes kicking his penis. Molly spends Thanksgiving with Neighbor Guy and experiments with butt plugs. She attempts to orgasm with him, but freezes from trauma. At her cancer group, Sonya directs the attendees to write about their fears and then to move their bodies at will while others read their stories. Molly suffers from a deep-vein thrombosis and spends Christmas in the hospital. Wanting to orgasm, she ignores Nikki's plans and Neighbor Guy and orders a dojo owner from Queens to masturbate on New Year's Eve; following an argument with Nikki, Molly runs out to the dojo owner's car, but loses sensation in her hand. She subsequently apologizes to Nikki.

Molly sees Neighbor Guy while out and collapses shortly afterwards, prompting the pair to profess their love for one another; at the hospital, her collapse is revealed to be caused by a collapsed lung, and she is intubated. Faced with the possibility that Molly could die if her breathing tube is removed, Nikki decides to have it removed for Molly's comfort. Molly is able to breathe on her own, and the two resume their goal of helping Molly have an orgasm with another person. Nikki leaves the hospital to collect Neighbor Guy's and Molly's things from her apartment, but is interrupted by her car being towed and then by Noah calling her; he brings Molly a bag of vibrators and Nikki some soup. A subsequent lumbar puncture reveals that her cancer has spread to the spine and she needs to enter hospice care, during which Neighbor Guy makes Molly orgasm. She spends her final weeks with Nikki and Gail, and is being looked after by Nurse Amy, with one final visit from Steve. After Molly's death, Nikki rekindles her relationship with Noah.

== Cast ==
=== Main ===
- Michelle Williams as Molly Kochan
- Jenny Slate as Nikki Boyer

=== Recurring ===
- David Rasche as Dr. Pankowitz, Molly's oncologist
- Esco Jouléy as Sonya, Molly's palliative care social worker
- Sissy Spacek as Gail, Molly's mother
- Kelvin Yu as Noah, Nikki's partner
- Jay Duplass as Steve, Molly's husband
- Rob Delaney as Neighbor Guy
- Zack Robidas as Hooper
- Tracee Chimo as Nikki's sister
- Annabelle Toomey as Young Molly

== Episodes ==
No.	Title	Directed by	Written by	Original release date
1	"Good Value Diet Soda"	Shannon Murphy	Story by : Kim Rosenstock & Elizabeth Meriwether; Teleplay by : Kim Rosenstock	April 4, 2025
2	"Masturbation is Important"	Chris Teague	Sheila Callaghan	April 4, 2025
3	"Feelings Can Become Amplified"	Chris Teague	Keisha Zollar	April 4, 2025
4	"Topping is a Sacred Skill"	Shannon Murphy	Madeleine George	April 4, 2025
5	"My Pet"	Shannon Murphy	Harris Danow	April 4, 2025
6	"Happy Holidays"	Shannon Murphy	Sasha Stewart & Sabrina Wu	April 4, 2025
7	"You're Killing Me, Ernie"	Shannon Murphy	Elizabeth Meriwether	April 4, 2025
8	"It's Not That Serious"	Shannon Murphy	Kim Rosenstock	April 4, 2025

== Production and release ==
The series is loosely based on the real-life experiences of Molly Kochan. After being diagnosed for breast cancer, Kochan underwent chemotherapy, a bilateral mastectomy, radiation therapy, and breast reconstruction treatment. She also started on a hormone therapy that increased her libido. In 2015, she was re-diagnosed with Stage IV breast cancer, which meant her illness was terminal. She went on to co-create along with her real-life friend Nikki Boyer a podcast called Dying for Sex, in which Kochan related how, after the diagnosis, she left her marriage and began a journey of sexual exploration. Kochan died on March 8, 2019, at the age of 45; the podcast and Kochan's memoir Screw Cancer: Becoming Whole was released the following year.

The series was created by Liz Meriwether and Kim Rosenstock, a pair who had started off as playwrights before working together on Meriwether's New Girl. Meriwether, then working on The Dropout, had received the podcast in March 2020 from a producer who thought she might be interested in it; the series was commissioned later that month. The pair started writing the show several months into the COVID-19 pandemic in the United States and consulted Emily Nagoski for Molly's orgasm scene. The pair had nothing to directly compare their scripts with on a narrative or tonal level, but were inspired by I May Destroy You and the sex in Normal People. In 2022, Michelle Williams spoke with Meriwether and Rosenstock via Zoom having been reduced to tears by the podcast, though declined to sign to the project as it was set in Los Angeles. Meriwether and Rosenstock continued to develop the show with five women, one non-binary person, and one man, during which time Williams became pregnant and narrated the audiobook for Britney Spears's The Woman in Me.

Williams eventually signed to the project after her daughter became obsessed with New Girl and after a chance meeting at the 2023 Critics Choice Awards with Meriwether, who told her that she was moving to New York. Her participation was announced in November 2023; it was her first TV role since 2019's Fosse/Verdon, for which she had won an Emmy Award, and contained her first masturbation scene. In January 2024, it was announced that Jenny Slate had joined the cast; at the time of her chemistry read in late 2023, she was looking for something with depth and breadth and had paused looking for other jobs to wait for it. Rob Delaney, David Rasche, Esco Jouléy, Jay Duplass, Kelvin Yu and Sissy Spacek were hired for recurring roles in April. Delaney had been public about his experiences with grief, having lost his toddler-aged son to a brain tumor. Filming on the series began in March 2024 in New York City; one scene, where Williams kicks Delaney's penis, was filmed repeatedly for more than half a day.

The trailer of Dying for Sex was released on March 18, 2025. The series premiered with all eight episodes in the United States on Hulu on April 4, 2025, and internationally on Disney+. The show contains massive amounts of male nudity, so much so that FX once asked the pair to tone it down slightly, though Williams does not herself appear nude. Meriwether and Rosenstock took several creative liberties; while Kochan's sex life with her husband had declined following her cancer treatment, she had already had her first orgasm beforehand, and Molly's real-life husband responded to Molly's terminal diagnosis by requesting that the counselor return to why he was angry. The pair opted to frontload Molly's childhood sexual abuse, rather than revealing it at the end like the podcast did, and she did not break her femur kicking a partner's penis or have her pet visit her in hospital. In addition, the series was set in Brooklyn rather than Los Angeles and many of Kochan's kinkier partners were merged into Neighbor Guy. Time also reported that the real-life Nikki was much more meticulous than her character and did not lose Molly's medical records.

== Reception ==
=== Viewership ===
JustWatch, a guide to streaming content with access to data from more than 45 million users around the world, reported that Dying for Sex was in the top ten most-streamed series in the U.S. from March 31 to April 6. TVision, using its Power Score to evaluate CTV programming through viewership and engagement across over 1,000 apps, estimated that the series was one of the fifteen most-streamed shows between April 7 and 13.

The streaming aggregator Reelgood, which tracks real-time data from 20 million U.S. users for original and acquired content across SVOD and AVOD services, calculated Dying for Sex was in the top ten most-streamed series between April 9–16. Nielsen Media Research, which records streaming viewership on U.S. television screens, reported that the show had been streamed for 5.9 million hours as of May 31.

=== Critical response ===
On the review aggregator website Rotten Tomatoes, Dying for Sex has an approval rating of 98% based on 60 critics' reviews, with an average rating of 8.4/10. The website's consensus reads: "Jaunty and sweet but never flippant, Dying for Sex leverages wonderful performances from Michelle Williams and Jenny Slate to present a bittersweet ode to living life to its fullest." Metacritic, which uses a weighted average, assigned a score of 82 out of 100, based on 15 critics, indicating "universal acclaim". Ben Travers of IndieWire wrote the film "act[ed] as exuberant encouragement for the rest of us to follow", while Nicole Vassell of Elle wrote that it was "thrilling to see a story of a woman's sexual liberation told so frankly" and "revolutionary to see it in the context of life with cancer".

Barbara Ellen of The Guardian loved the series, but felt that the series ran two episodes too long and that "for some the juxtaposition of sexual high jinks and mortality may jar". The same publication's Lucy Mangan complimented the series for "upend[ing] just about every expectation" and for being "a feminist endeavour to its core." Mangan appreciated the show's highlighting of Molly's emotional and physical exploration of her desires, through a "variety of sexcapades," as well as the strong female friendship between Molly and Nikki, wishing, "uniquely in the annals of modern television history," for "longer episodes or a longer season, so that more justice could be done to all parts of Molly's life." Kat Rosenfield of The Free Press wrote that the series's men were all "losers, jerks, weirdos, or predators".

Anita Singh of The Daily Telegraph wrote that the sex became "an annoying distraction" to the tender scenes between Molly and Nikki and felt the series was unrelatable, while Ann Marie Hourihane of the Irish Independent raised eyebrows at Molly not losing her hair or being bloated by treatment and wrote that the show could do with less sex and more death. Mary McNamara of the Los Angeles Times also wrote that the series was somewhat unrealistic, but felt that this could be "easily overlooked by the power of the performances, the hilarious courage of the writing and the glorious reconstruction of a familiar genre" and also compared the series to the 1970 film Love Story. Lili Loofbourow wrote that her one criticism of "a script that largely appreciates humans in all their flawed complexity is that it paints too saintly a picture of Nikki while leaning fearlessly into Molly's flaws", while Dana Dickey of PureWow was frustrated by the image of viewers interpreting Kochan's orgasm as a dying woman's treat, on the grounds that orgasms were "a life essential for everyone".

=== Accolades ===
Year	Award	Category	Nominee(s)	Result	Ref.
2025	Astra TV Awards	Best Limited Series	Dying for Sex	Nominated	
2025	Astra TV Awards	Best Actress in a Limited Series or TV Movie	Michelle Williams	Nominated	
2025	Astra TV Awards	Best Supporting Actress in a Limited Series or TV Movie	Jenny Slate	Nominated	
2025	Astra TV Awards	Best Writing in a Limited Series or TV Movie	Shannon Murphy, Kim Rosenstock, and Elizabeth Meriwether (for "It's Not That Serious")	Nominated	
2025	Astra TV Awards	Best Cast Ensemble in a Limited Series or TV Movie	Dying for Sex	Nominated	
2025	Critics' Choice Television Awards	Best Limited Series	Dying for Sex	Nominated	
2025	Critics' Choice Television Awards	Best Actress in a Limited Series or Television Movie	Michelle Williams	Nominated	
2025	Gotham TV Awards	Breakthrough Limited Series	Kim Rosenstock, Elizabeth Meriwether, Nikki Boyer, Kathy Ciric, Shannon Murphy, Katherine Pope, Kim Rosenstock, and Michelle Williams	Nominated	
2025	Gotham TV Awards	Outstanding Lead Performance in a Limited Series	Michelle Williams	Nominated	
2025	Gotham TV Awards	Outstanding Supporting Performance in a Limited Series	Jenny Slate	Won	
2025	Primetime Emmy Awards	Outstanding Limited or Anthology Series	Elizabeth Meriwether, Kim Rosenstock, Katherine Pope, Kathy Ciric, Hernan Lopez, Jen Sargent, Marshall Lewy, Aaron Hart, Michelle Williams, Nikki Boyer, Shannon Murphy, and Leslye Headland	Nominated	
2025	Primetime Emmy Awards	Outstanding Lead Actress in a Limited or Anthology Series or Movie	Michelle Williams	Nominated	
2025	Primetime Emmy Awards	Outstanding Supporting Actor in a Limited or Anthology Series or Movie	Rob Delaney	Nominated	
2025	Primetime Emmy Awards	Outstanding Supporting Actress in a Limited or Anthology Series or Movie	Jenny Slate	Nominated	
2025	Primetime Emmy Awards	Outstanding Directing for a Limited or Anthology Series or Movie	Shannon Murphy (for "It's Not That Serious")	Nominated	
2025	Primetime Emmy Awards	Outstanding Writing for a Limited or Anthology Series or Movie	Kim Rosenstock, and Elizabeth Meriwether (for "Good Value Diet Soda")	Nominated	
2025	Primetime Creative Arts Emmy Awards	Outstanding Casting for a Limited or Anthology Series or Movie	Jeanie Bacharach and Jessica Daniels	Nominated	
2025	Primetime Creative Arts Emmy Awards	Outstanding Contemporary Costumes for a Limited or Anthology Series or Movie	Melissa Toth, Kenn Hamilton, Caroline Quiroga, Chris Rumery, and David Burnett (for "Topping is a Sacred Skill")	Nominated	
2025	Primetime Creative Arts Emmy Awards	Outstanding Music Composition for a Limited or Anthology Series, Movie or Special (Original Dramatic Score)	Ariel Marx (for "It's Not That Serious")	Nominated	
2025	Television Critics Association Awards	Outstanding Achievement in Movies, Miniseries or Specials	Dying for Sex	Nominated	
2025	Television Critics Association Awards	Individual Achievement in Comedy	Michelle Williams	Nominated	
2026	Film Independent Spirit Awards	Best Lead Performance in a New Scripted Series	Michelle Williams	Nominated	
2026	Film Independent Spirit Awards	Best Supporting Performance in a New Scripted Series	Jenny Slate	Nominated	
2026	Directors Guild of America Awards	Outstanding Directorial Achievement in Limited and Anthology Series	Shannon Murphy	Won	
2026	Golden Globe Awards	Best Limited Series, Anthology Series, or Motion Picture Made for Television	Dying for Sex	Nominated	
2026	Golden Globe Awards	Best Actress in a Limited Series, Anthology Series, or Motion Picture Made for Television	Michelle Williams	Won	
