= Molly Kochan =

American podcaster (1973–2019)

- Born: July 19, 1973; New York, US
- Died: March 8, 2019 (aged 45)
- Presenting career
- Show: Dying for Sex

Molly Kochan (July 19, 1973 – March 8, 2019) was an American podcaster from Los Angeles. After being diagnosed with terminal cancer in 2015, she separated from her husband and launched a blog, "Everything Leads to This". She spent her final years having large amounts of sex with dates and her final months co-presenting the podcast Dying for Sex and writing her memoir, Screw Cancer: Becoming Whole. The podcast and memoir were both released in 2020; the former became a TV series in 2025.

== Biography ==
Kochan was born on July 19, 1973, in New York. Her parents met at a concert and married after she was conceived, divorcing shortly afterwards. Her father, Alex Kochan, later managed REO Speedwagon and Survivor, while her mother struggled with cocaine addiction and anxiety. Aged seven, Molly was molested by her mother's boyfriend, who also drugged her mother. In 1999 or 2000, having recently moved to Los Angeles, she became best friends with Nikki Boyer after being paired with her at an acting class in Los Angeles. The pair were together when they met Kochan's future husband, then a waiter at one of their favorite cafés.

In 2005, after encountering pain during sex and finding a lump in her breast, she made an appointment with her gynecologist, who wrongly told her she was too young to have breast cancer. She asked again in 2011 after it got bigger, by which time it had spread to her lymph nodes, necessitating chemotherapy, a mastectomy, and hormone therapy. The last of these induced insomnia and increased her libido, which she coped with by sending men selfies of herself in lingerie. She later underwent breast reconstruction, and based her new breasts on Boyer's. In 2015, after experiencing hip pain and undergoing a biopsy, she was diagnosed in August with terminal stage IV cancer, which had spread to her bones, brain, and liver. She subsequently set up a blog, "Everything Leads to This", and began having cybersex with strangers. At the time, she and her husband were undergoing couples counseling, and Kochan left her husband in March 2016, outlining her action in a blog post.

She subsequently spent a couple of years having a large number of sexual liaisons; she and Boyer once counted 188 sexual partners. She did not allow penetrative sex due to the effects of an early negative experience and due to the medication she was taking causing menopause, but did encounter a man who wanted to be kicked in the penis, a man with a foot fetish, a man who wanted to be urinated on, and a man who dressed up as a dog and wanted to live in a cage in her house. She bought stilettos for the first of these. In 2018, having already been on two dates that day, Kochan met with Boyer for lunch, where they developed the idea for a podcast called Dying for Sex, which would deal with her cancer and trauma and Boyer's IVF. Kochan later started an Instagram account with that name.

The pair pitched Dying for Sex to television executives, who understood neither the concept nor how to promote it. The pair then made ten episodes themselves, which addressed nearly 200 of Kochan's encounters. Production was impacted several times by Kochan's failing health; she recorded part of episode four in a hospital as she was receiving treatment for thrombi and recorded later episodes with a progressively weak and raspy voice. Kochan was hospitalized in December 2018 under the impression that her stay would be brief; she continued to sext during this period and gave one male visitor oral sex. After she was intubated, it became apparent that she would require hospice care, and Kochan and Boyer opted to continue recording on her phone.

Kochan became more confident over this period, directly addressing doctors who patronised her or otherwise treated her inappropriately and turning down visitors that depressed her. She spent her final months writing her memoir, Screw Cancer: Becoming Whole, and died just after midnight on March 8, 2019, having been cared for by Boyer until the end. Dying for Sex was broadcast in six installments between February and March 2020, while Screw Cancer was released in August 2020 and was self-published by Boyer. In November 2023, it was announced that the podcast would be serialized for a TV series; the show was released on April 4, 2025, and was loosely based on Kochan's experiences.
