= Lizzo's Watch Out for the Big Grrrls =

Reality television series

- Genre: Reality television
- Directed by: Nneka Onuorah
- Presented by: Lizzo
- Country of origin: United States
- No. of seasons: 1
- No. of episodes: 8

Production
- Executive producers: Kevin Beisler; Glenda N. Cox; Myiea Coy; Farnaz Farjam; Kimberly Goodman; Makiah Green; Lizzo; Julie Pizzi
- Producer: Katie Kildahl
- Production companies: Bunim/Murray Productions; Lizzo Bangers; Amazon Studios

Original release
- Network: Amazon Prime Video
- Release: March 25, 2022

Lizzo's Watch Out for the Big Grrrls is an American reality television series in which 13 women compete to be dancers for singer Lizzo, who also hosts the show. It premiered on March 25, 2022, on Amazon Prime Video. In April 2023, the series team began casting for a second season, but this never materialized.

At the 74th Primetime Emmy Awards, the series received six nominations, and won three including one for Primetime Emmy Award for Outstanding Competition Program.

== Contestants ==
=== Season 1 ===
- Jayla Sullivan
- Sydney Bell
- Charity Holloway
- Arianna Davis
- Ashley Williams
- Asia Banks
- Kiara Mooring
- Moesha Perez
- Isabel Jones
- Jasmine Morrison
- Crystal Williams
- Kimberly Arce
- Ki'ana Rowland

== Episodes ==
No.	Title	Original release date
1	"Becoming 100% That Bitch"	March 25, 2022
2	"HBCYOU Band"	March 25, 2022
3	"Curves and Confidence"	March 25, 2022
4	"Naked"	March 25, 2022
5	"Mirror Mirror on the Wall"	March 25, 2022
6	"Girl Run That Shit Back"	March 25, 2022
7	"Boss Up and Change Your Life"	March 25, 2022
8	"Good As Hell"	March 25, 2022

== Reception ==
The series received mostly positive reviews. Laura Bradley of The Daily Beast wrote, "On paper, Watch Out for the Big Grrrls might sound like a pretty safe prospect; to a cynic's ear, a house full of women getting along and supporting one another in their dreams doesn't sound like a breeding ground for compelling stakes. But even if the series can veer dangerously close to treacly territory at times, it's never saccharine or inauthentic in its tone."

=== Accolades ===
Year	Award	Category	Nominee(s)	Result	Ref.
2022	Critics' Choice Real TV Awards	Best Competition Series: Talent/Variety	Lizzo's Watch Out for the Big Grrrls	Won	
2022	Hollywood Critics Association TV Awards	Best Streaming Reality Show or Competition Series	Lizzo's Watch Out for the Big Grrrls	Won	
2022	People's Choice Awards	The Competition Show of 2022	Lizzo's Watch Out for the Big Grrrls	Nominated	
2022	Primetime Emmy Awards	Outstanding Competition Program	Lizzo, Makiah Green, Kevin Beisler, Julie Pizzi, Farnaz Farjam, Myiea Coy, Kimberly Goodman, Glenda N. Cox, Alana Balden, Marco Franzitta, Brittany Matthews, and Chelsea Bray	Won	
2022	Primetime Creative Arts Emmy Awards	Outstanding Directing for a Reality Program	Nneka Onuorah (for "Naked")	Won	
2022	Primetime Creative Arts Emmy Awards	Outstanding Casting for a Reality Program	Lynne Spillman, Blair Kim, and Jazzy Collins	Nominated	
2022	Primetime Creative Arts Emmy Awards	Outstanding Cinematography for a Reality Program	Michael Jacob Kerber (for "HBCYOU Band")	Nominated	
2022	Primetime Creative Arts Emmy Awards	Outstanding Picture Editing for a Structured Reality or Competition Program	Deidre Panziera, Hannah Carpenter, Brian Murphy, and Jeanie Phillips (for "Naked")	Won	
2022	Primetime Creative Arts Emmy Awards	Outstanding Sound Mixing for a Nonfiction or Reality Program (Single or Multi-Camera)	Erik Brena, Ross D'Alessandro, Julianne Kane, and Deanna Decenario (for "Becoming 100% That Bitch")	Nominated	
2022	Set Decorators Society of America Awards	Best Achievement in Décor/Design of a Variety, Reality or Competition	Bryant Berry and James McGowan	Nominated	
2023	Art Directors Guild Awards	Excellence in Production Design for a Variety, Reality or Competition Series	James McGowan (for "HBCYOU Band")	Nominated	
2023	Costume Designers Guild Awards	Excellence in Variety, Reality-Competition, Live Television	Carrie Cramer & Jason Rembert (for "Girl Run That Sh*t Back")	Won	
2023	GLAAD Media Awards	Outstanding Reality Competition Program	Lizzo's Watch Out for the Big Grrrls	Nominated	
2023	Make-Up Artists and Hair Stylists Guild Awards	Best Contemporary Hair Styling in a Television Special, One Hour or More Live Program Series or Movie for Television	Chantelle Johnson Mosley, Shelby Swain	Nominated	
2023	Producers Guild of America Awards	Best Game & Competition Television	Lizzo's Watch Out for the Big Grrrls	Won	
