= Megan Thee Stallion: In Her Words =

2024 film by Nneka Onuorah

- Release poster
- Directed by: Nneka Onuorah
- Produced by: Kisha Imani Cameron; Carmen Cee
- Starring: Megan Thee Stallion
- Edited by: Chris McNabb; Samuel Nalband
- Music by: Megan Thee Stallion
- Production companies: Roc Nation; Time Studios; Amazon MGM Studios
- Distributed by: Amazon Studios
- Release date: October 31, 2024
- Running time: 112 minutes
- Country: United States
- Language: English

Megan Thee Stallion: In Her Words is a 2024 documentary film centered on the life and career of American rapper and songwriter Megan Thee Stallion. Directed by Nneka Onuorah, in collaboration with Roc Nation and Time Studios, the film follows Megan Thee Stallion as she discusses her music, growth as an artist, and the challenges she has faced in the music industry. Visually, In Her Words combines live action with an anime art style.

The film premiered at the TCL Chinese Theatre on October 30, 2024, and was released worldwide via Amazon Prime Video the following day.

== Synopsis ==
The film follows the career of Megan Thee Stallion, starting from when she was just coming up in Houston, Texas to her rise to fame. It examines how she navigates herself in a male-dominated genre, as well as the various career issues that she encounters along the way. It touches on the effect of her deceased mother on both her career and life in general. And also addresses the widely publicized 2020 shooting involving Tory Lanez and its impact on her.

== Release ==
On October 14, 2024, Megan Thee Stallion and Amazon Studios announced that the film would be released on Amazon Prime Video on October 31, 2024. The film received a wider international release on October 31, 2024, with Megan Thee Stallion making an appearance at the film's premiere event.

== Accolades ==
Awards and nominations for Megan Thee Stallion: In Her Words
Year	Ceremony	Category	Result	Ref.
2025	NAACP Image Awards	Outstanding Directing in a Documentary (Nneka Onuorah)	Nominated	
2025	iHeartRadio Music Awards	Favorite On Screen (Megan Thee Stallion)	Nominated	
2025	Gracie Awards	Best Documentary	Honoree	
2025	The Astra Awards	Best Documentary TV Movie	Nominated	
