= The Same Difference =

- Directed by: Nneka Onuorah
- Produced by: Anthony Allred and Nneka Onuorah
- Cinematography: Paris Holmes
- Edited by: Anthony Vario
- Release date: June 23, 2015
- Running time: 78 minutes
- Country: United States
- Language: English

The Same Difference is a 2015 documentary, directed by Nneka Onuorah. The documentary provides an insightful look at lesbians who discriminate against other lesbians based on gender roles. The film follows a series of lesbian women stories, discusses the hypocrisy in terms of gender roles and the performative expectations attached.

== Background ==
Onuorah told AfterEllen that she wanted to make a documentary about discrimination in the lesbian community because she saw a lot of it growing up. She had faced discrimination herself for not picking a side—for not picking the more masculine side all the time and not necessarily picking the more feminine side. Her intent with this film was to create content that liberated and changed lives, she said. All the while she wanted to raise media representation of queer urban women's experiences because of lack of representation in LGBT content. She also said she hoped people will be less judgmental and more open-minded and that people will have the strength and confidence to be their complete authentic self, even if that is outside the lines of the norm.

== Content ==
The documentary is about lesbians who discriminate against other lesbians based on gender roles. Onuorah takes an in-depth look at the internalized heteronormative gender roles that have become all too familiar within the African American lesbian and bisexual community. Onuorah shows how these behaviors reproduce the homophobic oppression and masculine privilege of the straight world, while looking for solutions in compelling discussions with community members. Self-identified studs—and the women who love them—discuss hypocrisy in terms of gender roles, performative expectations, and the silent disciplining that occurs between community members.

This film features many queer celebrities, including actress Felicia "Snoop" Pearson from the HBO drama The Wire, AzMarie Livingston from FOX's Empire, and Lea DeLaria from Netflix's Orange Is the New Black, living daily with opinions about how identity should be portrayed. Onuorah's engaging documentary shines a light on the relationships and experiences within the queer black female community, intersecting race, gender and sexuality.

== Awards, festivals, and screenings ==
- Audience Award for Outstanding Documentary Feature, NewFest LGBT Film Festival
- Frameline, San Francisco International LGBTQ Film Festival
- Out Fest Fusion
- Reel Affirmations LGBT Film Festival
- QFest St Louis
- Queer Screen Mardi Gras Film Festival
- Q Films Long Beach
- Sacramento International Gay and Lesbian Film Festival

== See also ==
- List of lesbian filmmakers
