= Nikki Boyer =

American actress and singer-songwriter (born 1975)

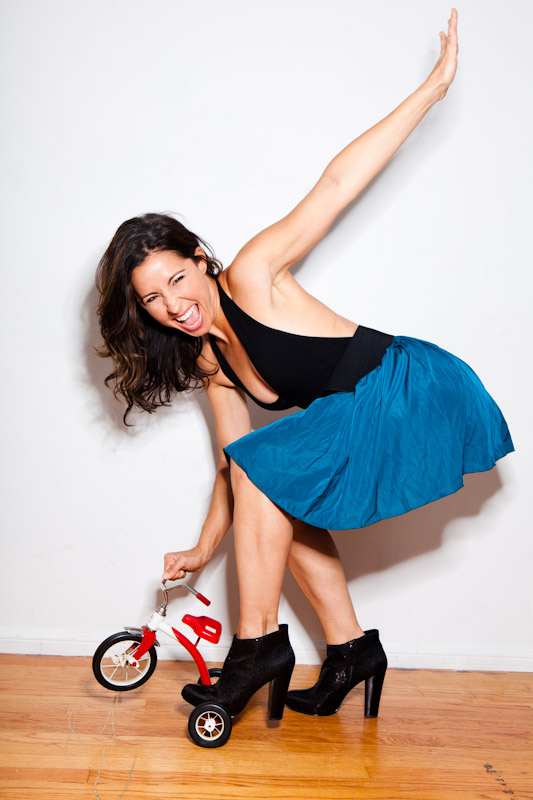

Background information
- Born: July 22, 1975 (age 51); St. Louis, Missouri, U.S.
- Occupations: Actress, singer, songwriter, executive producer
- Instrument: Vocals
- Years active: 1998–present

Nikki Boyer (born July 22, 1975) is an American actress, singer-songwriter and executive producer. She served as executive producer of the FX show Dying for Sex, based on the Wondery podcast of the same name she co-created. Boyer is the former host of Yahoo!'s "Daytime in No Time", receiving millions of hits per day. Boyer is also the former co-host of Watch This! on the TV Guide Channel.

== Career ==
Boyer moved to Los Angeles, California in 1998 and began singing with The Spirit Theory.

In 2003 and 2004, Boyer hosted TLC's reality television series Perfect Proposal. In 2007, she became the co-host of Watch This! on the TV Guide Channel.

In 2008, her latest album, Underlying Poetry was released with her band The Spirit Theory. She now performs with "The Cardboard Cutouts" - her band with Tommy Fields. Boyer also regularly appears on The Tonight Show's Ross "The Intern" Mathews' podcast "Straight Talk with Ross".

Until recently, Boyer hosted Yahoo TV's Daytime in No Time, a spin-off of Primetime in No Time. For a short time, she also co-hosted Yahoo TV's What's so funny? with Mike Bachman.

Boyer is the host and co creator of the hit Wondery Podcast, "Dying for Sex". Listed as one of the top 20 Pods on Apple Podcasts, Boyer helps her best friend Molly tell her story. When Molly is diagnosed with Stage IV breast cancer, she decides to do something bold. She leaves an unhappy marriage and embarks on a series of sexual adventures to feel alive. The television adaptation premiered on April 4, 2025, on FX as an 8 episode limited series starring Michelle Williams and Jenny Slate, with Boyer as executive producer. Liz Meriwether and Kim Rosenstock are co-showrunners.

== Filmography ==
- 1999: A Vow to Cherish (TV movie); as Cindy
- 2000: GamePro Minutes (TV series); as the Hostess
- 2002: The Jersey; 3 episodes
- 2004: Perfect Proposal (TV series); as the Hostess
- 2005: The Dry Spell; as the College Girl
- 2005: The Late Late Show with Craig Ferguson; episode: #1.107 (sketch comedy actor)
- 2006: Midnight Clear; as Megan
- 2006: So NoTORIous; episode: "Street" (scary voice)
- 2006: Malcolm In The Middle; episode: "Morp"
- 2006: Watch This! (TV series); co-host
- 2007: According To Jim (TV series); episode: "The Flannelsexual" as Tanya Mountains
- 2007: The L Word (TV series); episode: "Livin' La Vida Loca" as Student #2
- 2007: Cake: A Wedding Story; as the Nurse
- 2009: Coyote County Loser; as Lauren Hartford
- 2012: Slap Therapy (movie short)
- 2012: All the Wrong Notes (TV series; also producer)
- 2012–13: Sketchy (TV series; also producer and writer)
- 2025: Dying for Sex (TV series); as Cousin Shelia (also executive producer)

== Discography ==
The Spirit Theory

- 2000: Hoping To Make Sense
- 2003: The Calmness in the Riot
- 2008: Underlying Poetry
