= 2011 in American television =

In American television in 2011, notable events include television show debuts, finales, cancellations, and channel launches, closures and re-branding, as well as information about controversies and carriage disputes.

== Events ==
=== January ===
Date	Event
1	PBS member station KCET/Los Angeles becomes an independent public/educational station. KOCE-TV/Huntington Beach, a secondary PBS affiliate serving nearby Orange County, replaces KCET as the LA market's primary PBS member station, rebranding as PBS SoCal.
1	Dish Network and Frontier Radio Management fail to reach a new carriage agreement, leaving Macon customers without both ABC and Fox, where both networks come from WGXA.
1	DirecTV removes the stations of Northwest Broadcasting due to a carriage dispute. The sides reach a temporary deal on February 1, in time for Super Bowl XLV.
1	Comedy Central retires the skyscraper-and-globe-themed logo, which it used in one form or another since its 1991 debut, and adopts a new logo mark featuring two "C"'s (which resemble a copyright symbol), with one of them and the word "Central" turned upside-down.
3	The Second Circuit Court of Appeals throws out a fine the FCC levied against ABC for a 2003 episode of NYPD Blue in which Charlotte Ross' character was viewed with a bare back.
3	ESPN fires play-by-play announcer Ron Franklin for making derogatory remarks to colleague Jeannine Edwards during prep work for a December 31 telecast of the 2010 Chick-fil-A Bowl. Prior to the firing, Franklin was pulled from ESPN Radio's January 1 coverage of the Fiesta Bowl over the incident.
5	The 37th People's Choice Awards are aired from the Nokia Theatre on CBS.
7	History announces that its first scripted miniseries, The Kennedys, will not air on the network, with a spokesperson stating, "This dramatic interpretation is not a fit for the History brand." The content of the 8-part multimillion-dollar project (produced in Canada in partnership with History's Canadian counterpart, History Television) had been the source of controversy; various sources claimed inaccuracies in the script, while the miniseries' director and production company countered that History officials gave approval on the final draft script and final cuts before dropping their broadcast plans. The producers would then begin shopping the production around to other networks, and on February 1 reached a deal with ReelzChannel, which would air the miniseries in April (this after Showtime, Starz, FX, and Audience Network took a pass).
7	Both Joan and Melissa Rivers announce that they will no longer do red carpet specials.
15	After a lengthy dispute and two deadline extensions, Sinclair Broadcast Group and Time Warner Cable reach an agreement in principle to keep 28 Sinclair-owned-or-operated stations in 17 markets on Time Warner cable television systems. A more formal agreement would be announced on February 2, which includes plans for TWC to produce newscasts for Sinclair's ABC affiliate in the Greensboro market, WXLV-TV, beginning in 2012.
17	Citing lack of air time, Marissa Jaret Winokur announces she will leave CBS' daytime series The Talk.
17	Piers Morgan Tonight, the replacement for the long-running Larry King Live, debuts on CNN, with Oprah Winfrey as Morgan's first guest.
18	Turner Broadcasting System announces it will turn over day-to-day control of its Atlanta station WPCH-TV to Meredith Corporation, who will operate the station through its CBS affiliate WGCL-TV. Additionally, production for Atlanta Braves broadcasts on WPCH (45 per year) will be handled by cable rights-holders Fox Sports South and SportSouth, making 2011 the first Braves season since 1972 in which Turner Sports will not produce local Braves telecasts.
18	After a lengthy review process, the FCC and Department of Justice approve (with conditions) Comcast's purchase of a controlling share of NBC Universal. The deal officially closes before midnight on January 28, with Comcast owning 51% of NBCU and General Electric 49%. GE completed a purchase of Vivendi's 12.3% share of NBCU on January 26.
20	Houston PBS outlet KUHT announces that they will merge their operations with its FM sister station to become Houston Public Media.
20	The American version of Skins premieres on MTV. The series' controversial content prompts the Parents Television Council to ask the show's producers be charged with child pornography and exploitation, alleging a violation of 18 USC 1466A. The controversy also leads major advertisers to pull their advertising from the program, among them Taco Bell, Wrigley Company, General Motors, Subway, H&R Block and Schick. MTV would cancel the show in June after one season.
21	Countdown with Keith Olbermann airs for the final time on MSNBC after its titular host abruptly departs the network.
25	U.S. President Barack Obama delivers his second State of the Union Address, which is followed by not one but two opposition responses: the official Republican Party rebuttal from Congressman Paul Ryan (R-Wisconsin 1st) and a Tea Party response by Congresswoman Michele Bachmann (R-Minnesota 6th). CNN is the only major network to carry Bachmann's response live, during which she does not speak directly to the TV camera.
28	CBS announced that Two and a Half Men would go on a production hiatus after series star Charlie Sheen is admitted into a rehabilitation center, one day after his hospitalization for a hernia condition.

=== February ===
Date	Event
1	FitTV rebrands as Discovery Fit & Health, reflecting the migration of programming from the former Discovery Health Channel since that network's conversion to Oprah Winfrey Network exactly one month earlier.
2	Several American reporters are attacked during the protests in Egypt: Anderson Cooper is kicked and punched, Katie Couric gets rocks thrown at her, and several others are harassed, held or beaten by the angry mobs.
3	After ten weeks, Comcast SportsNet California and Dish Network end their carriage dispute, and the regional sports network is returned to the satellite provider.
3	Una Vez Mas purchases two Texas stations from the bankrupt Johnson Broadcasting, KNWS/Houston and KLDT/Dallas. The stations' call signs are respectively changed to KYAZ and KAZD, and their affiliations also change to Azteca America.
4	Viacom (the American company that owns Nickelodeon) becomes a co-owner of the Italian television studio Rainbow S.p.A. after purchasing a 30% stake. Following the purchase, Nickelodeon collaborated with Rainbow on multiple shows, including Winx Club and Club 57.
6	The Green Bay Packers's 31–25 defeat of the Pittsburgh Steelers in Super Bowl XLV attracts 111 million viewers, making the Fox broadcast the most-watched program in American TV history, surpassing the previous record of 106.5 million viewers for Super Bowl XLIV one year earlier.
8	Current TV announces that Keith Olbermann will join the network as its Chief News Officer and will have an equity stake in the network's parent company, Current Media. Olbermann will also anchor and executive produce a nighttime broadcast for the network. That show, which would start on June 20, bears the same name as his former MSNBC show, Countdown.
10	Simon Cowell, a former American Idol judge and show founder of The X Factor, based on the British series of the same name, announced that the show's grand prize would include a US$5 million prize package with a recording contract, billed as its biggest prize in reality-competition.
11	Fox Entertainment Group announces that its MyNetwork TV service has been renewed for three more years, through 2014.
13	Sony, IMAX and Discovery Communications launch 3net, a new 3DTV channel.
14	Disney Channel's daily morning program block for preschoolers, Playhouse Disney, rebrands as Disney Jr., as part of the network's plan to establish Disney Junior as a stand-alone network in 2012 (replacing SOAPNet). That same day, Jake and the Never Land Pirates premiered.
14	ESPN 3D is upgraded to a 24-hour channel.
14	Time Warner Cable announces the formation of two new Southern California-based regional sports networks named TWC SportsNet and TWC Deportes (one in English, one in Spanish) that would launch in 2012. The networks would serve as exclusive local TV homes of basketball's Los Angeles Lakers for 20 years beginning with the 2012–2013 NBA season.
14–16	The Watson computer built by IBM competes on the game show Jeopardy! and defeats two well-known Jeopardy! champions, Ken Jennings and Brad Rutter.
20	Xfinity 3D, a Comcast-owned 24-hour 3DTV channel, commences programming with coverage of the 2011 Heritage Classic.
22	NBC announces deals to broadcast all three races in the Triple Crown of Thoroughbred Racing—the Kentucky Derby, Preakness Stakes, and Belmont Stakes—through 2015. The deals reunite all three Triple Crown races on NBC for the first time since 2005, and will also include coverage on Versus of the races' Friday and Saturday undercards, including the Kentucky Oaks and Black-Eyed Susan Stakes. (ABC had aired the Belmont since 2006, while the undercards had aired on ESPN for several years.)
23–24	A unique daytime-primetime crossover airs involving ABC's All My Children and TV Land's Hot in Cleveland: the premise involves Wendie Malick's Cleveland character, Victoria Chase, landing a bit role on AMC as a housekeeper. Malick (as Victoria) appears on the AMC broadcast of the 24th; AMC castmembers Susan Lucci, Darnell Williams and Michael E. Knight appear on Cleveland's episode of the 23rd.
24	Following a series of angry public rants by star Charlie Sheen, including comments directed at his employers, CBS and Warner Bros. announce that production on Two and a Half Men will be canceled for the remainder of the season.
25	CNN announces that Parker Spitzer co-host Kathleen Parker will leave the show to concentrate on writing her syndicated news column (though she will continue to be a CNN contributor). On February 28, the show is revamped and retitled In the Arena, with sole host Eliot Spitzer presiding over roundtable discussions with journalists and contributors.
26	The seventh season of Game Show Network's High Stakes Poker premieres, with a 3D television simulcast on N3D, the first for a serial program.

=== March ===
Date	Event
3	Portsmouth, New Hampshire-based Carlisle One Media, Inc. announces an agreement to purchase WZMY-TV/Derry, New Hampshire from ShootingStar Broadcasting of New England. The deal for the MyNetworkTV and Universal Sports station, which is operated by New Age Media, would close in May, when the station changes call sign to WBIN-TV.
4	Twenty-seven stations owned and operated by LIN TV Corporation that serve 17 markets vanish from Dish Network at midnight after the two companies fail to reach a retransmission consent deal. The stations are restored by March 13, when the companies reach a new deal.
4	The 42nd NAACP Image Awards are aired from the Shrine Auditorium on Fox.
7	After a week of interviews in which he continues criticizing his employers, but also appears at times rambling and incoherent, Charlie Sheen is fired from Two and a Half Men.
14	Aflac fires Gilbert Gottfried as the voice of its Aflac Duck after his comments on Twitter about the earthquake and tsunami in Japan three days prior are deemed insensitive by the press.
15	The 2011 NCAA Division I men's basketball tournament begins play, as does a multi-year broadcast partnership with CBS Sports and Turner Sports that will allow, for the first time, nationwide broadcasts of all tournament games in their entirety on CBS, TBS, TNT, and TruTV (it's the first sports programming for the latter network, which is known for true crime and reality programming).
18	Netflix announces a deal with Media Rights Capital for North American distribution of the original drama series House of Cards, which will premiere on the online and video distribution service in late 2012. It is Netflix's first announced foray into distributing original episodic content. (Lilyhammer would be Netflix's first original show, debuting in February 2012.)
18	As part of an effort to end state funding of South Carolina ETV and turn over operations to private interests, South Carolina Republican Governor Nikki Haley replaces the entire board of directors that oversee the radio/TV network.
19	Tribune-owned CW affiliate KIAH/Houston converts its hour-long 5 and 9 p.m. evening newscasts to NewsFix, a new format that de-emphasizes the traditional use of anchors and reporters, uses voiceover narration (by local radio personality Greg Onofrio) for continuity, and emphasizes visual storytelling, including graphics and camerawork.
22	A court-appointed receiver approves the sale of insolvent WLNE-TV/New Bedford, Massachusetts to Citadel Communications. Citadel, whose purchase attempt gained the approval of ABC (of which WLNE is an affiliate), close on the sale on June 1.
25	Amanda Knox, an American woman who was appealing her conviction of the 2007 murder of her roommate in Italy, filed an injunction to block a television film based on her case from airing on Italian television, claiming the movie (which premiered in the U.S. on Lifetime on February 22) left her "exploited" and "very disturbed." Knox also sought to block the film from running on the internet. YouTube has obliged by removing clips of and references to the movie from its website. On October 4, an Italian jury overturned her conviction and Knox was freed. As a result, Lifetime announced that it will alter the TV movie to reflect the outcome.
28	BBC World News America moves from BBC America to sister network BBC World News and is shortened from 60 to 30 minutes. The move is part of an effort to expand BBC News' U.S. operations (including efforts to increase cable/satellite carriage of BBC World News in the U.S.), as well as to more clearly define BBC America as an entertainment channel ( WNA still airs on several public television stations).
29	AMC announces that the new season of Mad Men, its fifth, will be delayed into early 2012, the side effect of ongoing contract negotiations between AMC, Lions Gate Entertainment, and series creator/producer Matthew Weiner. Weiner would ink a deal to continue as Mad Men showrunner on March 31.
30	Avoiding a blackout, LIN TV Corporation reaches a retransmission deal with cable provider Cox Communications, covering 9 LIN stations in 5 markets.
31	New York City-based regional sports network SNY announces they are in a carriage dispute with Dish Network. The dispute comes to light the same day as the 2011 Major League Baseball season commences play (SNY is the cable home of the New York Mets). SNY was later removed from Dish Network, prompting SNY to take out ads attacking the satellite TV company, and encouraging their customers to switch providers.
31	Another New York City based regional sports network YES Network (cable home of the New York Yankees and New Jersey Nets) informed DirecTV customers of a carriage dispute, which would have resulted in a loss of the channel beginning April 2. After a week of good faith negotiations and a temporary agreement that allowed the channel to remain on DirecTV for another six days, a new long-term carriage agreement was reached on April 7 with no interruption of service.
31	Time Warner Cable removes 12 cable networks owned by Discovery Communications, Fox Cable Networks and Viacom from its iPad streaming video app after the companies complain their addition on the app was a violation of their distribution agreements with TWC. Animal Planet, FX, and MTV are among the networks removed from the app. The next day it replaces them with 17 new channels, among them those owned by The Walt Disney Company, NBC Universal, and AMC Networks.

=== April ===
Date	Event
1	Four Fox Sports Net-affiliated regional sports networks serving Pittsburgh, the Pacific Northwest, the Rocky Mountains and Utah, adopt a new branding, Root Sports. The networks, all owned by DirecTV Sports Networks, continue programming relationships with FSN as well as their own local team contracts.
1	Citing the station's lack of financial viability, the owners of Orlando PBS affiliate WMFE-TV announce that the station will be sold. The buyer is religious broadcaster Daystar, who plans to eventually change WMFE to a Daystar station upon FCC approval.
1	SJL Broadcasting completes its reacquisition of WJRT-TV/Flint and WTVG/Toledo from ABC.
2	Elton John hosts Saturday Night Live and is the musical guest as well. It was John's first appearance on the NBC show in almost 30 years.
2	The 2011 Kids' Choice Awards are aired on Nickelodeon at the Galen Center.
4	In an effort to expand its programming beyond college athletics, CBS College Sports Network rebrands as CBS Sports Network.
4	Cablevision unveils its own iPad app, featuring 300 live channels streaming over its own proprietary Advanced Digital Cable network. In response, YES Network claims its inclusion on the app is a violation of their distribution agreement. Viacom files a similar complaint on April 7.
5	Dish Network buys bankrupt video rental chain Blockbuster Inc. for $320 million at auction.
6	Fox News Channel and Glenn Beck announce that Beck's self-titled show will end later in the year (June 30 would be its final airing), although Beck plans to develop new content for the network.
7	Nexstar Broadcasting Group announces its purchase of CBS affiliates WFRV-TV/Green Bay and WJMN-TV/Marquette, a deal that would close on July 2. It also reveals its intentions for a separate local newscast on the latter station, which currently simulcasts news from the former.
7	WWE announces its plans to launch its own 24-hour cable channel in 2012.
11	Hearst Corporation announces it will purchase a stake in reality producer Mark Burnett's eponymous production company.
11–15	Wheel of Fortune introduced a gameplay element in which picking up two such car plates would win a car. The debut featured was in a form similar to the Million Dollar Wedge (with the car plate sandwiched between two $500 spaces), and it would become a permanent format starting September 26 (which now became regular car plates covering a full wedge), until its retirement at the end of the 36th season.
14	ABC announces the cancellation of two of its long-running daytime dramas—All My Children, which will end its 41-year run in September, and One Life to Live, whose 43-year run will end in January 2012. Both shows will be replaced by lifestyle and talk programming. The moves will leave General Hospital as ABC's last remaining daytime drama.
14	Cellular phone company Verizon Wireless announces it will phase out its "Can You Hear Me Now?" campaign. The catchphrase had been uttered on Verizon commercials since 2002 by the "Verizon Test Guy" (actor Paul Marcarelli), who last appeared in February promos for Verizon's iPhone 4.
14	The studios of NBC affiliate WDIV-TV/Detroit are evacuated after a suspicious package is left in the station foyer. Though no explosives are discovered, the scare forces the station's 11 p.m. newscast to be delayed by 15 minutes.
18	In protest over ABC's cancellation of All My Children and One Life to Live, floor care company Hoover announces it will pull all advertising from the network as of April 22 and start a campaign to save both shows.
18	GSN, ESPN, and Fox Sports Net begin to pare down or cancel airings of poker broadcasts and poker website advertising in the wake of United States v. Scheinberg, in which websites Full Tilt Poker and PokerStars are seized by federal authorities. ESPN and FSN would pull broadcasts of PokerStars-sponsored events, while GSN would reduce the number of weekly airings of High Stakes Poker, airing them without any mentions of poker website sponsorship.
18	George Gray, former host of the syndicated version of The Weakest Link, officially becomes the fourth announcer of CBS's The Price Is Right.
19	NBC Sports and the National Hockey League reach a new 10-year broadcast deal, running through the 2020–2021 season. The new deal will include national broadcasts of all Stanley Cup playoff games on NBC or sister channel Versus.
20	20th Television announces that it will develop a new talk show for Ricki Lake, which will debut in September 2012.
20	Dave Willis announces that after 10 years on air, the title Aqua Teen Hunger Force, the longest running series on Cartoon Network's program block Adult Swim, would officially be changed to Aqua Unit Patrol Squad 1. The first official episode of the series to premiere as an Aqua Unit Patrol Squad 1 eventually aired on May 8, 2011.
21	DirecTV launches its Home Premiere pay-per-view service, which allows subscribers to watch movies only 60 days after their theatrical release at a price of $29.99 each.
25	Public broadcasting station KCET/Los Angeles, beset by drops in ratings and revenues after disaffiliating with PBS, announces it will sell its longtime Sunset Boulevard studios to the Church of Scientology. In June, KCET would announce plans to move to a smaller studio in suburban Burbank by April 2012.
27	NBC affiliate WALB in Albany, Georgia begins airing ABC programming on WALB-DT2, marking ABC's first full-time affiliate in Albany since the demise of WVGA (now CBS affiliate WSWG) in 1992. This also gives Albany in-market affiliates of all four major commercial networks.
28	The CW names Mark Pedowitz as its new president, replacing Dawn Ostroff, who left the network at the end of May.
28	In a "supersized" episode (from 30 to 50 minutes), Steve Carell makes his last appearance as a regular on The Office.
29	An estimated 22.8 million viewers in 18.6 million American households watch live coverage from Great Britain of the wedding of Prince William and Catherine Middleton, which airs in the U.S. at 6 a.m. (EDT).

=== May ===
Date	Event
1	In an interview with 60 Minutes colleague Scott Pelley, CBS' Lara Logan recounts her sexual assault by male protestors in Cairo's Tahrir Square while covering the Egyptian protests the previous February.
1	A special crossover storyline involving Family Guy, The Cleveland Show and American Dad! is pulled by Fox in the wake of a recent series of devastating storms and tornadoes that destroyed portions of the Southeastern United States. The planned episodes had the characters in all three shows bracing for a hurricane that was headed their way. The episodes later aired October 2, 2011.
1	The major networks break into prime time programming (Brothers and Sisters on ABC, CSI: Miami on CBS, and The Celebrity Apprentice on NBC) to report the killing of Osama bin Laden by U.S. forces in Pakistan, which is confirmed by a late night (11:30PM ET) address from the White House by President Obama.
2	Dish Network and EchoStar announce that it will pay TiVo $500 million to settle their seven-year-long patent infringement battle over DVR technology used by Dish.
3	An estimate released by Nielsen indicates that the number of households with television sets will decrease in 2012 for the first time in 20 years.
4	The soon-to-be Pac-12 Conference announces a broadcast deal with ESPN and Fox Sports that goes into effect in 2012. The agreement will feature game broadcasts on ESPN's and Fox's sister networks (including ABC and FX), as well as their sharing broadcast duties for the conference's football and men's basketball championships on an alternating basis.
5	Judy McGrath announces her resignation as chairman/CEO of MTV Networks.
5	Fox News Channel ends the contracts of two of its political contributors, Newt Gingrich and Rick Santorum. Both men, who were suspended by Fox on March 2, failed to meet a network-imposed May 1 deadline for their decisions on not running for president. (Gingrich would formally declare his candidacy on May 11, Santorum on June 6.)
6	Oprah Winfrey Network CEO Christina Norman is dismissed and replaced on an interim basis by Peter Liguori, the chief operating officer of OWN's co-owner Discovery Communications. Winfrey would move into the CEO position in the fall.
6	Spanish Broadcasting System (SBS) acquires KTBU/Conroe, Texas from USFR Media Group for $16 million. Upon the completion of the sale, KTBU will join SBS-TV.
8	With contract negotiations finishing at the last minute, Paula Abdul formally joins the judging panel on Fox's The X Factor for this date's taping of the first judging session.
13	CBS announces that Ashton Kutcher will replace the fired Charlie Sheen on Two and a Half Men when new episodes resume in the fall.
14	At the closing of his weekly Fox News program, Mike Huckabee announces that he will not run for President of the United States in 2012.
15	After four attempts in Survivor, Rob Mariano emerged as the sole survivor on the twenty-second season of Survivor; at 117 days of participation, he surpassed Parvati Shallow's record of 114 days as the longest played player in the show's history at the time of the finale. As of his fifth played season in Winners at War, Mariano played a cumulative 152 days (excluding his involvement in Island of the Idols), surpassing Ozzy Lusth's 127 which was surpassed during Game Changers six years later.
16	After seriously flirting with the idea for months, businessman and The Apprentice host Donald Trump announces that he will not run for President of the United States in 2012. Eight months later on December 23, Trump switches his party affiliation from Republican to Independent due to a possible opening to enter the race as a third-party candidate.
16	NBC and its affiliates announce plans for a "proxy" agreement that would see the network handle cable/satellite retransmission negotiations for any consenting affiliates. NBC, in exchange, would receive a percentage of the retrans fees the stations receive.
16	Charlie Ergen steps down from his position as CEO of Dish Network. He would be succeeded in June by Joe Clayton.
16	Fox announces that Seth MacFarlane will create a new version of the classic animated series The Flintstones. Production will begin in Fall 2011 for a projected 2013 premiere.
17	Telemundo announces that Cristina Saralegui will host a weekend talk show on the Spanish-language network beginning later in 2011. Saralegui had hosted a long-running talk show on competitor Univision until its cancellation in November 2010.
18	On NBC, Christopher Meloni makes his final full-time appearance as Detective Elliot Stabler on Law & Order: Special Victims Unit in its twelfth season finale.
19	After failing to reach a new contract with owner Comcast, Dick Ebersol announces his resignation as chairman of NBC Sports after 22 years, with Mark Lazarus, who heads NBC Sports Cable Group, being tapped to replace Ebersol. (Ebersol's second-in-command, NBC Sports president Ken Schanzer, would announce his retirement one week later on May 26, effective at the end of summer.)
19	Katie Couric ended her less-than-five-year tenure as anchor of the CBS Evening News.
20	After 29 years, Mary Hart anchors Entertainment Tonight for the final time.
22	During a coverage of a tornado, Rockford, Illinois station WREX is hit by one.
24	ACME Communications announces it has completed the sale of 3 of its stations: WBXX-TV/Knoxville (to Lockwood Broadcast Group), WCWF/Green Bay (to LIN TV Corporation), and WBDT/Dayton (to WBDT Television, LLC, which will have LIN TV operate the station).
24	ABC announces that it will turn over its Saturday morning kids' programming block to Litton Entertainment, who will launch a new lineup billed as Litton's Weekend Adventure on September 3.
24	Nancy Grace steps down as host of Swift Justice with Nancy Grace to remain in Atlanta and continue with her eponymous HLN show. Former Las Vegas judge Jackie Glass will take over as host for the show's second season, which will relocate from Atlanta to Los Angeles.
25	After 25 years in syndication, Oprah Winfrey hosts the final original episode of her eponymous program, a guest-free retrospective and "thank you" to her viewers.
25	MSNBC talk host Ed Schultz takes a one-week unpaid leave from his MSNBC primetime show for comments directed at conservative commentator Laura Ingraham on his syndicated radio program the previous day, in which Schultz twice referred to Ingraham as a "slut". Schultz addresses the remarks and makes an on-air apology to Ingraham during the opening four minutes of the evening's broadcast, after which he turns it over to MSNBC anchor Thomas Roberts and begins his leave. Schultz returned as host of his primetime program on June 6.
26	The University of Central Florida's Board of Trustees approves a TV partnership with Brevard Community College, operator of WBCC/Cocoa, Florida. The partnership, which will be branded as WUCF-TV, will become Orlando's full-time PBS affiliate on July 1, when WMFE-TV disaffiliates from PBS and moves up V-me from a subchannel to its main channel while Daystar awaits FCC approval of its purchase of WMFE.

=== June ===
Date	Event
1	DirecTV rebrands The 101 Network as Audience Network.
6	ABC announces it has signed Katie Couric to host an eponymous daytime talk show that will be distributed by the network's syndication arm and premiere on September 6, 2012. At that time, ABC is expected to turn over the 3-4PM (ET/PT) hour of its daytime network schedule back to its affiliates (General Hospital currently airs in that time slot, and its future after September 2012 has yet to be determined). Also as part of the deal, Couric will contribute to ABC News programming.
6	Fox confirms that Cheryl Cole has been dropped as a judge on The X Factor. Nicole Scherzinger, who was originally tapped to co-host the show with Steve Jones, while remaining sole host, would fill Cole's void on the judging panel alongside Paula Abdul, Simon Cowell, and L.A. Reid.
6	Scott Pelley takes over as anchor of the CBS Evening News.
6	Jim Lehrer steps down as a regular anchor of PBS NewsHour after 36 years, although he continues to make contributions to the program.
7	NBCUniversal outbids ESPN/ABC and Fox to retain rights to air the Olympic Games through 2020. The deal between NBC and the International Olympic Committee is valued at $4.38 billion.
8	Meredith Vieira anchors her final broadcast of Today after five years. Ann Curry, the NBC show's newsreader since 1997, moves into the co-host role with Matt Lauer the following day.
8	Science Channel rebrands with a new logo, graphics, and name, going as simply "Science."
13	NBC affiliate KSL-TV/Salt Lake City announced that it would not air the drama The Playboy Club when it premieres in September, citing the station's policy to screen content its audience may find objectionable (KSL's parent company, Bonneville International, is owned by The LDS Church). The show will air instead on the market's MyNetworkTV station, KMYU/St. George, and its Salt Lake City simulcast, KUTV-DT2. NBC later canceled the series after airing only three episodes.
13	Comcast SportsNet Bay Area began providing daily sports reports for KNTV/San Jose, California. It is the first instance since Comcast's takeover of NBCUniversal that a Comcast regional sports network provides sportscasts for an NBC O&O in the same market (CSN-produced broadcasts of San Francisco Giants games have aired on KNTV since 2008).
13	KNX radio announcer Jim Thornton officially becomes the announcer of Wheel of Fortune. Earlier, Thornton made his debut as announcer on a majority of the season starting on December 20, 2010.
15	NBC's broadcast of Game 7 of the 2011 Stanley Cup Finals, in which the Boston Bruins defeat the Vancouver Canucks to win their first Stanley Cup in 39 years, was watched by 8.5 million viewers, the largest audience for an NHL game in the U.S. since 1973.
20	NBC issued an apology for running an opening montage during its U.S. Open broadcast the previous day that featured a partially redacted recitation of the Pledge of Allegiance.
20	Citing a Major League Baseball rule that forbids franchises to borrow on future assets in order to pay current bills, MLB Commissioner Bud Selig rejects a proposed local TV contract between the Los Angeles Dodgers and Fox Sports Net's Prime Ticket. As a result, the Dodgers filed for Chapter 11 bankruptcy a week later. (Dodgers owner Frank McCourt had been in a protracted divorce case, the settlement of which was contingent on MLB's approval of the team's deal with Fox.)
23	Viacom sues Cablevision over the latter company's iPad app, claiming it is in violation of their distribution agreement.
24	The State of Hawaii Department of Commerce and Consumer Affairs issues a 15-year cable franchise license to Hawaiian Telcom, thus ending Oceanic Time Warner's 35-year monopoly as the state's sole cable TV provider. Hawaiian Telcom launched the service on July 1, after a year of testing in the Honolulu area, with statewide expansion to start in 2012.
26	The 11th BET Awards are aired on BET.
27	New Moon Communications, a minority-owned broadcasting company based in Tulsa, Oklahoma, announces it will acquire four LPTV stations, all of them former TBN affiliates, from The Minority Media and Telecommunications Council. The stations—WDON/Dothan, Alabama, WZMC/Jackson, Tennessee, KJNE/Jonesboro, Arkansas and KUMK/Ottumwa, Iowa—were slated for NBC affiliation starting in September, but eventually were either sold off or never had digital facilities built out and their licenses canceled. Of the four, only WDON ever came to air as an NBC affiliate, after being sold to Gray Television and becoming WRGX-LD.
29	In NBC, Javier Colon, who was coached by Maroon 5's lead singer Adam Levine, was crowned as the first-ever winner of The Voice; Dia Frampton, coached by country singer Blake Shelton, became the runner-up.
30	Five months after joining Univision as its executive vice president and COO, Randy Falco is promoted to the president and CEO positions at the network.
30	MSNBC analyst Mark Halperin calls President Obama a "dick" during a live broadcast of Morning Joe. Halperin warned he was about to use the vulgarity and asked for a 7-second delay so it could be censored, but the show's new executive producer didn't know how to do so and the profanity was aired uncensored. Though Halperin would issue an on-air apology, he would be suspended by the network.

=== July ===
Date	Event
1	Control of public television's New Jersey Network shifts from the State of New Jersey to a subsidiary of WNET/New York City, which rebrands the stations as NJTV while the state retains the stations' licenses. The changeover comes 4 days after the New Jersey Senate, by one vote, fails to block the plan.
1	Cablevision completes its spinoff of Rainbow Media, changing its name to the publicly held company AMC Networks. On the same day, the new company shuts down Wedding Central.
1	PBS member station KTEH/San Jose, rebrands to KQED Plus (KQEH) for another channel of quality Public Television, where KQED was not related to KTEH.
3	NBC airs Wimbledon for the 43rd and final time, with the network stating later in the day that they have been outbid for future US broadcast rights to the annual British tennis tournament. The winning bidder would be ESPN, who has carried early round coverage since 2003 and will carry all rounds exclusively (and live to all time zones) until 2023.
4	OTA Broadcasting wins the bankrupt independent station KFFV/Seattle from North Pacific International Television, Inc., with a bid of $5.2 million in auction.
6	NBC transferred the ownership of one of its three stations in Los Angeles, Spanish-language independent station KWHY-TV, to local businessman Alex Meruelo, who had acquired the station for $43 million in January. The station became a MundoFox affiliate in 2012.
7	Media/production company Prospect Park announces it has picked up the license to produce and air new episodes of All My Children and One Life to Live on an in-development website similar to Hulu after the shows conclude their runs on ABC. Prospect Park would be unable to reach deals with all parties involved (from actors to financial backing), and by November 23 would announce it would shut down production development on both soaps, thus preventing both from being the first of the genre to transfer their first-run broadcasts from conventional television to online broadcasting.
7	The Philadelphia-based 3rd Circuit Court of Appeals rules in favor of the Federal Communications Commission over their 2008 decision to keep the cross-ownership rules for TV/radio stations as it is. The ruling also includes keeping current limits on local ownership rules, including the "sub-caps" for AM and FM stations, and that the commission was correct in not counting HD Radio simulcasts against the ownership limits.
8	Al Michaels teams with Bob Costas to broadcast a Major League Baseball game between the New York Mets and San Francisco Giants from San Francisco on the MLB Network. This marked the first time that Michaels called a baseball game since Game 5 of the 1995 World Series on ABC. Michaels and Costas also made appearances on SportsNet New York and Comcast SportsNet Bay Area during the game's middle innings, since the MLB Network broadcast was blacked out in the Mets' and Giants' respective home markets.
9	Nickelodeon's The Fairly OddParents marks its ten-year anniversary with a live-action adaptation of the popular cartoon called A Fairly Odd Movie: Grow Up, Timmy Turner!. The direct-to-TV movie stars Drake & Josh star Drake Bell as Timmy Turner.
11	Bahakel Communications announces its purchase (subject to FCC approval) of Montgomery's CW affiliate, WBMM, from SagamoreHill Broadcasting, as well as a shared services agreement to operate SagamoreHill's ABC affiliate, WNCF. Both stations will be operated through Bahakel's CBS affiliate, WAKA.
11	Law & Order: LA airs its series finale on NBC, leaving the network's Law & Order: Special Victims Unit as the last remaining show in the Law & Order franchise.
13	The 19th ESPY Awards are aired from the Nokia Theatre.
17	The United States women's national soccer team's shootout loss to Japan in the 2011 FIFA Women's World Cup Final gives ESPN its highest ratings ever for a soccer telecast, with an average of nearly 13.5 million viewers.
18	Citing fatigue in the position and difficulty with boxing broadcast negotiations, Ross Greenburg announces he will leave as president of HBO Sports after 11 years in the position and 33 years with the network.
20	After a six-month stint as a fill-in for MSNBC's 6 pm timeslot, The Young Turks' Cenk Uygur turns down a deal to sign with the network and parts ways. Al Sharpton, who took his spot and saw the ratings for his appearance increased, took over the hour on a permanent basis and was later given his own show called PoliticsNation, which premiered August 29.
21	Nexstar Broadcasting Group announces that it will put all of its 65 television stations, including 15 stations operated by Mission Broadcasting, up for sale.
25	Nickelodeon launches a block of reruns of its 1990s programming to cater to its twentysomething viewers. Dubbed The '90s Are All That, the block airs on its older-skewing sister channel, TeenNick.
26	The Parents Television Council sends letters to all NBC affiliates urging them to not air the new series The Playboy Club. NBC later canceled the series after airing only three episodes.
27	Both MSNBC and host Rachel Maddow are sued by conservative preacher-musician Bradlee Dean (the founder of the religious group You Can Run But You Cannot Hide International) for $50 million in damages, claiming that Maddow took his comments that homosexuals should be executed in accordance with Islamic Sharia law out of context during a segment on her show in 2010, despite a disclaimer about his personal views (including a posted retraction by Dean about the statement) made by Maddow. MSNBC has stated that Dean's lawsuit has no merit.
27	The Pac-12 Conference announces it will launch a group of one national and six regional networks dedicated to airing sporting events featuring the conference's schools. The networks are set to debut in August 2012.
28	Una Vez Mas acquires KFTY/Santa Rosa, California from High Plains Broadcasting (operated through a joint sales agreement with Newport Television) for $5.2 million. By September 29, the station will end 39-years as an English-language independent station (and 3 months with MeTV) and become the San Francisco Bay Area's Azteca America affiliate (under the new call sign KEMO-TV).
31	Johnathan A. Rodgers steps down as president and CEO of TV One. Wonya Lucas replaces him.

=== August ===
Date	Event
1	Starz Entertainment makes several changes and additions to its Encore premium multiplex service: an eighth channel, Encore Español, launches as a Spanish-language simulcast of the primary Encore channel; Encore Mystery and Encore WAM are rebranded as Encore Suspense and Encore Family respectively; and high definition feeds of Encore Action and Encore Drama launch. Additionally, MoviePlex discontinues its rotating daily simulcasts of programming from Encore's multiplex channels and becomes a standalone channel. On this date and August 2, Encore aired its first original programming: the mini-series Moby Dick. Additional original programs scheduled for Encore this year are the mini-series The Take and the documentary Method to the Madness of Jerry Lewis.
1	The Fox affiliation in Fort Wayne, Indiana moves from WFFT-TV to WISE-TV, a subchannel of Fort Wayne's NBC affiliate that retains secondary affiliation with MyNetworkTV. WFFT-TV becomes an independent station, which was its status from its 1977 launch until joining Fox in 1986. The swap occurs 6 days after WFFT owner Nexstar Broadcasting Group, which had been going through a falling out with Fox in several of its markets, files a federal antitrust lawsuit against WISE owner Granite Broadcasting over Granite's monopolization of operating 2 TV stations with 4 network affiliations in the Fort Wayne market (Granite operates, through an LMA, ABC/CW affiliate WPTA, which is owned by Malara Broadcasting).
1	MTV celebrates the 30th anniversary of its launch. Sister network VH1 Classic joins in by airing the channel's original first hour (including the original commercials and technical difficulties) in addition to some of the network's most memorable shows and moments throughout the weekend.
1	PBS announces that it is launching a PBS-branded channel in the United Kingdom in November.
1	Comcast and NBCUniversal announce that Versus will be rebranded as NBC Sports Network on January 2, 2012.
4	Comcast sues DirecTV for false advertising for ads that claim its exclusive out of market sports package NFL Sunday Ticket is now free for new customers. Comcast dropped the case on August 19 after DirecTV altered the ads to remove the word "free".
7	The 2011 Teen Choice Awards are aired at the Gibson Amphitheatre on Fox.
8	Verizon Communications accuses striking workers of vandalizing its systems.
10	Major League Soccer announced a three-year deal, effective in 2012, with NBC Sports that will see MLS regular season and playoff games, as well as United States men's national soccer team games, carried by NBC and NBC Sports Network. The deal will replace MLS' relationship with Fox Soccer and Fox Deportes that dates back to 2003 (deals with ESPN and Univision will remain in place).
12	Cinemax, the Time Warner-owned premium cable channel known for running mainstream feature films and late night adult programming under the "Max After Dark" banner, expands its original programming into mainstream content with the U.S. launch of the primetime British action series Strike Back (the series, which will be aired in the United States for the first time, originally debuted on Sky1 in the U.K. in 2010, with first-run episodes set to air on Cinemax being from the second season). Additional action series Transporter: The Series, The Sector, Banshee, and Sandbox are in production and are scheduled to premiere in 2012. Earlier in the month on August 1, the channel retired its logos that have been used since 1997 (the logo in use at the time, a modification of the 1997 version, dates back to 2008), changing to a new ones with a different font and color scheme.
15	Fox begins next-day streaming of its shows to paying customers of approved cable and satellite distributors. People who want to see the episodes the following day for free on Hulu will have to wait eight days after the first-run telecasts.
15	Time Warner Cable announces it will buy out Insight Communications for $3 billion.
17	Christine O'Donnell becomes the first guest to walk out on Piers Morgan Tonight after the host asked her questions on her views on same-sex marriage, which she thought were rude.
18	CBS announces that both Holly Robinson Peete and Leah Remini will no longer be co-hosts of The Talk when the second season starts. Kris Jenner has been tapped as a temporary co-host while comedian Sheryl Underwood is expected to be a permanent regular.
19	Bravo announces it will reedit the upcoming season of The Real Housewives of Beverly Hills after Russell Armstrong, husband of Taylor Armstrong, is found dead from an apparent suicide. The couple was reportedly having marital problems.
26	Longhorn Network, a 24-hour cable channel dedicated to the University of Texas at Austin launches, with Verizon FiOS as the only major provider to reach a carriage deal.
29	Univision-owned WUVC-DT/Raleigh premieres a weeknight half-hour 6 p.m. newscast, titled Noticias 40. It is the first Spanish-language local newscast in the state of North Carolina.

=== September ===
Date	Event
1	Mediacom fails to reach a new carriage agreement with LIN Media, resulting in LIN stations in Mobile, Alabama, Pensacola, Florida, Grand Rapids, Michigan, Green Bay, Wisconsin, Fort Wayne, Terre Haute and Lafayette, Indiana being removed from Mediacom systems. The signals would be restored by October 15, when the two sides reach a retransmission agreement.
4	Tennis Channel removes its signal from Cablevision and Verizon FiOS due to carriage disputes with both providers.
4	Major changes take place on the MDA Labor Day Telethon: The show is shortened to six hours (less than one third its previous length), airs live only on the East Coast, and abandons its nominal and traditional carryover to Labor Day (instead airing only on this date). It also does not include any live appearance by Jerry Lewis, the telethon's founder and host since its inception, although a tribute to him is featured in the telecast's opening and closing segments (Lewis was "released" from his post at the Muscular Dystrophy Association on August 3).
8	Sinclair Broadcast Group announces its acquisition of 7 TV stations from Four Points Media Group for $200 million, a deal that closes the first week of January 2012. The stations involved in the transaction are KUTV and KMYU/Salt Lake City, KEYE/Austin, WTVX, WWHB and WTCN/West Palm Beach, and WLWC/Providence. The deal brings Sinclair into these four TV markets for the first time.
8	The same day the 2011 NFL regular season kicks off, ESPN extends its contract for Monday Night Football for another eight seasons, giving it rights to the broadcasts until 2021. The new deal, valued between $14.2 billion and $15.2 billion, also gives them rights to expanded highlights, international and digital rights, and possibly a Wildcard game. The deal also draws rebukes from cable operators over its cost and the likelihood of an increase in ESPN's already record-high retransmission consent fees.
8	After his original date (September 7) is turned down by House leadership, President Barack Obama delivers a speech on jobs to the United States Congress on this date. The speech is delivered at an unusual time for a Presidential speech to Congress: the prime time "access" slot of 7PM (ET), so as to avoid potential conflict with the NFL's season opener between New Orleans and Green Bay. The president's speech finishes well before the game's start time of 8:30PM (ET).
11	Broadcast and cable networks air programming to mark the 10th anniversary of the September 11 terrorist attacks. Notable programs include live coverage of the dedication of the 9/11 Memorial on the site of the World Trade Center in New York City plus memorial services at The Pentagon and Shanksville, Pennsylvania, and the real-time airing of the documentary 102 Minutes That Changed America across A&E Television Networks at 8:46 a.m. EDT.
12	Seeking to expand the network's coverage and possibly add HD content, NBC Sports announces it will move its Universal Sports from an over-the-air digital multicast network to a cable/satellite network, beginning in early 2012. DirecTV already offers the channel on its national lineup.
12	Wichita CBS affiliate KWCH begins producing half-hour 4 and 9 p.m. newscasts for CW affiliate KSCW-DT (both stations are owned by Schurz Communications). The latter KSCW-DT newscasts will compete with an existing 9 p.m. newscast KWCH produces for Fox affiliate KSAS-TV, owned by Newport Television, since 2004 (KSAS' news share arrangement with KWCH will expire at the end of the year). As a result, KWCH will become the first U.S. television station to simultaneously produce newscasts for four stations in the same market (in addition to its own newscasts and the outsourced news programs for KSCW-DT and KSAS, it also produces a newscast for Univision affiliate KDCU-DT) and the first U.S. station to produce competing outsourced primetime newscasts for two stations in the same market.
13	Journal Communications announces that they will drop The Cool TV from their stations and plan to sue parent company Cool Music Network for $257,500, claiming that they were not paid for broadcasting services prior to June 1. The channels will be replaced with programming from other providers, such as Live Well Network and Me-TV.
13	The 63rd Primetime Emmy Awards airs on Fox. This telecast, which was produced for the first time by Mark Burnett, is part of an eight-year renewal deal with the four major over-the-air networks (Fox, ABC, CBS, and NBC), ending speculations that it would move to cable.
21	Kelli Giddish makes her first appearance as Detective Amanda Rollins in the season 13 premiere of NBC's Law & Order: Special Victims Unit.
23	After more than 10,000 episodes in 41 years, the soap opera All My Children airs its final episode on ABC.
25	Fast food chain Wendy's unveils a new ad campaign based on its "Where's the beef?" ad campaign of the 1980s, using a new slogan that answers that question: "Here's the beef."
26	Bounce TV, an over-the-air digital broadcast television network aimed at an African-American audience, commences programming.
26	A&E Networks rebrands History International as H2, which includes broadcasts of more recent documentary programming to it from parent channel History.
27	ALN (American Life Net) is rebranded as Youtoo TV, with a new format featuring Internet based programs as well as viewer contributed videos via social networking sites.
28	The Price Is Right airs its 7,500th CBS daytime episode.

=== October ===
Date	Event
1	AT&T Uverse removes NHL Network due to a carriage dispute.
2	Ending a 33-year run, and just one month before his November 4 death, Andy Rooney makes his last appearance as a commentator on 60 Minutes.
3	ESPN pulls Hank Williams Jr.'s longtime opening intro to its Monday Night Football telecast after the singer makes remarks on Fox and Friends earlier in the day comparing President Obama to Adolf Hitler. Although Williams later apologized for the comments, Williams and ESPN mutually agreed to no longer use the song as the theme for Monday Night Football.
4	HD Theater is rebranded as Velocity to more naturally fit its increased focus on male-oriented programming.
11	Roberts Broadcasting, whose portfolio includes four CW affiliates and one My Network TV affiliate, files for Chapter 11 bankruptcy due to the company defaulting on payments to Warner Bros. Television Distribution that resulted in the latter pulling their properties from Roberts' stations, and an earlier lawsuit of the same from CBS Television Distribution.
14	After considering a sale of the online video service in June, News Corporation, The Walt Disney Company, Comcast and Providence Equity Partners decide to continue their joint ownership of Hulu and pull it from the sale block.
14	The FCC orders that Madison Square Garden, Inc. has to make a carriage agreement with Verizon FiOS and AT&T Uverse for the high definition feeds of regional sports networks MSG and MSG Plus by October 22, and launch them on the providers by November 14.
18	Inspired by actor Zachary Quinto's decision to come out as a gay man, ABC World News Now anchor Dan Kloeffler announces on air that he is also coming out as a gay man as well.
20	CBS commemorates the 60th anniversary of its eye logo.
21	FIFA, soccer's governing body, reaches U.S. broadcast deals with Fox Sports (English language) and Telemundo (Spanish language) for FIFA championship events from 2015 to 2022, including the 2018 and 2022 Men's World Cup championships. Fox's bid surpasses those from incumbent ESPN and NBC Sports, while Telemundo's bests Spanish incumbent Univision.
27	14 years after ending its original run, Beavis and Butt-Head returned to MTV with its all new season 8 and 9 premiere, the combined episode Werewolves of Highland/Crying.
28	Game 7 of the World Series is broadcast on Fox. The St. Louis Cardinals defeat the Texas Rangers (in their second consecutive appearance). It was the team's eleventh world championship. David Freese was awarded the series Most Valuable Player due to his iconic walk-off home run in the 11th inning during Game 6.
31	Averting a midnight deadline, DirecTV reaches a carriage agreement with News Corporation to preserve the signals of News Corp-owned channels FX, National Geographic Channel, Speed, Fuel TV, Fox Soccer, Fox Soccer Plus, Fox Movie Channel, Fox Deportes and the 19 Fox Sports Net channels, which would have gone dark on DirecTV had the deal not been reached. The agreement also covers Fox Business Network, Fox News Channel, National Geographic Wild, and the Fox owned and operated local broadcast stations, which were part of a separate deal that expired at years-end. (DirecTV filed a complaint with the FCC Media Bureau on October 27 about News Corp's false claims that the Fox broadcast stations were part of the networks' dispute.) In a separate deal, DirecTV reaches a carriage deal with Belo for that company's broadcast stations, which also would have been removed on November 1 had that deal not been reached.

=== November ===
Date	Event
2	Sinclair Broadcast Group makes its second station purchase of 2011, acquiring the eight stations (mainly ABC and CBS affiliates) put up for sale by Freedom Communications earlier in the year. The deal (pending FCC approval) is worth $385 million.
2	NBCUniversal announces that is reorganizing its local NBC Nonstop digital broadcast channels carried on ten of the 11 NBC stations owned by the company's NBC-Owned Television Stations division into one national network. The national NBC Nonstop, which will feature news and lifestyle programming (along with locally produced content by its affiliates) is set to launch in early 2012, and will also be made available for distribution to NBC affiliates not owned by NBCUniversal (it will be the second news and information digital multicast network venture by NBC, the weather-focused NBC Weather Plus operated from 2004 to 2008).
3	Bounce TV announces an affiliation deal with Fox Television Stations Group. The digital multicast network will initially be available to Fox's MyNetworkTV stations in Los Angeles (KCOP) and New York City (WWOR-TV), with eventual subchannel carriage on additional Fox-owned MNT stations. The deal is FTSG's first subchannel venture, and makes Bounce TV the second outside-owned multicaster to reach an affiliation agreement with a major O&O group (The Local AccuWeather Channel was carried on ABC's O&O stations from 2006 to 2010).
3	Conan O'Brien ends his week-long return to New York City by officiating what is believed to be the first televised same-sex marriage between a staff member and his partner on Conan.
7	ABC affiliate WBBJ-TV in Jackson, Tennessee announces that they have signed an affiliation deal with CBS and will carry their programs on their DT3 subchannel, beginning January 1, 2012. This will be the first time since 1968 that WBBJ carried CBS programming when it was WDXI-TV (as it was a CBS affiliate from its 1955 sign on until its network switch to ABC that year).
9	At approximately 2:00 PM EST, all television and radio stations in the Emergency Alert System are tested simultaneously, the first nationwide test of the system since its 1997 inception.
9	The Ellen DeGeneres Show welcomes its first ever Muppet-related guest Kermit the Frog.
14	NBC announces that it has signed Chelsea Clinton to their news division as their special correspondent.
15	Belo Corporation and Raycom Media announces a shared services agreement for their Tucson outlets. As a result of this deal, Raycom's CBS affiliate KOLD will take over the programming and newscasts operations of Belo's Fox outlet KMSB and sister My Network TV affiliate KTTU, starting in February 2012. Belo will continue to own KMSB and KTTU and retain their sales department.
18	After 28 years, Regis Philbin appears on Live! for the last time.
20	The American Music Awards airs, with the program being led into by its first official red carpet pre-show with a performance by Hot Chelle Rae.
24	Actor-director Hugh Laurie announces that he will retire from performing on television after 30 years in the business. Laurie states that he will transition more into directing and big-screen roles once his Fox series House M.D. concludes its run after its eighth season.
29	The 2011 Victoria's Secret Fashion Show is broadcast on CBS. 10.3 million people tune in.
29	On NBC Nightly News episode a fire alarm went off in the studio.

=== December ===
Date	Event
1	A station sale and shared services agreement announced on August 8 takes effect in the Evansville, Indiana market: Nexstar Broadcasting Group acquires ABC affiliate WEHT from Gilmore Communications, while selling independent WTVW to Mission Broadcasting. Both stations combine operations on this date out of WEHT's studios, and WEHT's sports subchannel affiliated with Wazoo Sports is discontinued completely. Additionally, their news operations are combined under one banner, Eyewitness News.
2	ABC announces that Brian Frons, who has served as the president of the network's ABC Daytime division since August 2002 and faced criticism over the April cancellation of longtime soap operas All My Children and One Life to Live, will step down from the position upon the expiration of his contract with ABC in January 2012. Vicki Dummer, currently serving as ABC's Senior Vice President of Current Series and Specials, will take over as president of the division, which will be internally renamed within the company as Times Square Studios.
5	Citing its "different business model" as an independent station (it lost its Fox affiliation on September 1), KTRV-TV/Boise suspends its news operations.
8	On Fox, criticisms surfaced about The X Factor where judge Nicole Scherzinger received death threats after she voted for a deadlock which caused one of the front-runners, Rachel Crow, to be eliminated. It was later revealed that Scherzinger will leave at the end of the season to become a judge in the flagship British edition of The X Factor the following year.
10	The 2011 Spike Video Game Awards are aired on Spike TV.
12	CBS Corporation announces it will purchase Long Island-based independent station WLNY-TV/Riverhead, New York from WLNY Limited Partnership. The sale gives CBS a duopoly with its O&O flagship WCBS-TV and allow it to expand WLNY's on-air staff and local news programming.
12	Disney XD announces that actor/singer Mitchel Musso will not return for the third and final season of Pair of Kings, with Adam Hicks (star of fellow Disney XD series Zeke and Luther) replacing Musso in a new role. The move comes after Musso's October 16 arrest and December 9 arraignment on 2 misdemeanor counts of DUI (for which a not guilty plea was entered in a Burbank district court). Additionally, his monthly Disney Channel series PrankStars was canceled immediately, with the remainder of the already filmed episodes never airing in the United States and burned off in the United Kingdom. Despite the arrest, Musso would remain as the voice of Jeremy Johnson on Phineas and Ferb, until the show's series finale in June 2015 and appearances beyond.
13	Citing a desire to return to international reporting, ABC announced that Christiane Amanpour will step down as host of This Week, but will continue to work for both ABC and prior employer CNN, where she will host a daily show for CNN International, where she hosted a show until 2010. George Stephanopoulos, whom Amanpour succeeded as host, will return to hosting This Week in January 2012 while continuing as co-host on Good Morning America.
14	The National Football League announces an extension of its contracts with broadcast partners CBS (AFC package), Fox (NFC package), and NBC (Sunday Night Football) through the 2022 season at an average total fee of $3 billion/year (the networks' current deals do not expire until 2013).
15	Howard Stern confirms he will join the judges panel of America's Got Talent in 2012, replacing Piers Morgan, who announced his departure from the show on November 9 in order to focus on his CNN program.
15	The First episode of Impractical Jokers airs on truTV.
20	ESPN on ABC announces changes to its NBA Countdown pregame show, including the elimination of the host position (leaving out Hannah Storm and Stuart Scott), a reliance on color commentators (including Magic Johnson), and a shift in production from ESPN's Bristol, Connecticut headquarters to its facility at LA Live.
22	The FCC puts forth a proposal that would loosen cross-ownership restrictions, including a move to allow common ownership of radio, TV, and print outlets in the top 20 U.S. markets (where restrictions are already tighter), and modifications to existing rules, including radio-TV ownership in smaller markets.
22	On Fox, Melanie Amaro (mentored by former American Idol judge Simon Cowell) was crowned the first U.S. winner of The X Factor, beating Chris Rene and Josh Krajcik.
30	The E. W. Scripps Company completes its $212 million purchase of McGraw-Hill's portfolio of TV stations.

== Programs ==
=== Debuts ===
Date	Show	Network	Source
January 1	Dan Vs.	The Hub	
January 1	House of Anubis	Nickelodeon	
January 1	Off the Air	Adult Swim	
January 1	Justice with Judge Jeanine	Fox News Channel	
January 3	Wild Kratts	PBS Kids Go!	
January 4	Live to Dance	CBS	
January 9	Bob's Burgers	Fox	
January 9	Downton Abbey	PBS	
January 9	The Cape	NBC	
January 9	Infested!	Animal Planet	
January 9	Episodes	Showtime	
January 9	Shameless	Showtime	
January 11	Lights Out	FX	
January 11	Onion SportsDome	Comedy Central	
January 12	Off the Map	ABC	
January 13	Beyond Scared Straight	A&E	
January 17	Being Human	Syfy	
January 17	Harry's Law	NBC	
January 17	Piers Morgan Tonight	CNN	
January 17	Skins	MTV	
January 17	Supah Ninjas	Nickelodeon	
January 19	Retired at 35	TV Land	
January 20	Fairly Legal	USA Network	
January 21	Ebert Presents: At the Movies	PBS	
January 21	Onion News Network	IFC	
January 21	Portlandia	IFC	
January 21	Spartacus: Gods of the Arena	Starz	
January 23	Kourtney and Kim Take New York	E!	
January 24	Bubble Guppies	Nickelodeon	
January 25	Kitchen Boss	TLC	
January 26	Face Off	Syfy	
January 28	Working Class	CMT	
February 1	One Born Every Minute	Lifetime	
February 1	Seriously Funny Kids	Lifetime	
February 7	The Chicago Code	Fox	
February 8	Traffic Light	Fox	
February 9	Quad Squad	Lifetime	
February 9	Mr. Sunshine	ABC	
February 11	Bar Karma	Current TV	
February 12	Must Love Cats	Animal Planet	
February 14	Babar and the Adventures of Badou	Disney Jr.	
February 14	Tinga Tinga Tales	Disney Jr.	
February 14	Jake and the Never Land Pirates	Disney Jr.	
February 14	Mad Love	CBS	
February 16	Criminal Minds: Suspect Behavior	CBS	
February 25	Camelot	Starz	
February 28	Martin Bashir	MSNBC	
March 6	America's Next Great Restaurant	NBC	
March 6	Breakout Kings	A&E	
March 6	Coming Home	Lifetime	
March 6	Taking On Tyson	Animal Planet	
March 6	Love & Hip Hop: New York	VH1	
March 7	All About Aubrey	Oxygen	
March 22	Brian the Fortune Seller	truTV	
March 29	All on the Line	Sundance TV	
March 29	Body of Proof	ABC	
March 31	Mobbed	Fox	
April 1	CHAOS	CBS	
April 3	The Borgias	Showtime	
April 3	The Kennedys	ReelzChannel	
April 3	The Killing	AMC	
April 4	Dr. Drew On Call	HLN	
April 4	Intentional Talk	MLB Network	
April 4	The Problem Solverz	Cartoon Network	
April 5	Pregnant in Heels	Bravo	
April 6	Breaking In	Fox	
April 6	Tori & Dean: sTORIbook Weddings	Oxygen	
April 6	Workaholics	Comedy Central	
April 6	Glamour Belles	Lifetime	
April 7	Gigolos	Showtime	
April 8	CMT's Next Superstar	CMT	
April 10	The Dance Scene	E!	
April 10	Khloé & Lamar	E!	
April 11	Drew Carey's Improv-A-Ganza	GSN	
April 12	Police POV	truTV	
April 12	Sinbad's Family Affair	WE tv	
April 13	Happy Endings	ABC	
April 14	The Paul Reiser Show	NBC	
April 17	Game of Thrones	HBO	
April 26	Repo Games	Spike	
April 26	The Voice	NBC	
May 3	The Looney Tunes Show	Cartoon Network	
May 3	The Amazing World of Gumball	Cartoon Network	
May 6	A.N.T. Farm	Disney Channel	
May 7	Pretty Hurts	Logo	
May 8	Why Not? with Shania Twain	Oprah Winfrey Network	
May 9	Eye Opener	Syndication	
May 10	Swamp Brothers	Discovery Channel	
May 26	4th and Forever	Current TV	
May 30	Extreme Weight Loss	ABC	
May 30	Platinum Hit	Bravo	
May 31	Million Dollar Decorators	Bravo	
May 31	Love Handles	Lifetime	
June 1	Franklin & Bash	TNT	
June 1	Haunted Collector	Syfy	
June 1	Twist of Fate	The Weather Channel	
June 1	The World According to Paris	Oxygen	
June 2	Love Bites	NBC	
June 5	So Random!	Disney Channel	
June 5	Teen Wolf	MTV	
June 6	Switched at Birth	ABC Family	
June 12	Ice Loves Coco	E!	
June 12	The Protector	Lifetime	
June 12	The Glee Project	Oxygen	
June 13	Almost Naked Animals	Cartoon Network	
June 13	Sidekick	Cartoon Network	
June 13	Kickin' It	Disney XD	
June 14	The Nine Lives of Chloe King	ABC Family	
June 14	Proving Ground	G4	
June 15	Happily Divorced	TV Land	
June 15	Rocco's Dinner Party	Bravo	
June 16	Voltron Force	Nicktoons	
June 19	Falling Skies	TNT	
June 22	Life on a Wire	Discovery Channel	
June 23	Expedition Impossible	ABC	
June 23	Suits	USA Network	
June 23	Wilfred	FX	
June 27	My Babysitter's a Vampire	Disney Channel	
June 27	Winx Club	Nickelodeon	
June 29	Love in the Wild	NBC	
June 29	Necessary Roughness	USA Network	
June 29	State of Georgia	ABC Family	
July 1	Bucket & Skinner's Epic Adventures	Nickelodeon	
July 4	Operation Osmin	NuvoTV	
July 8	Say Yes to the Dress: Bridesmaids	TLC	
July 11	The Five	Fox News Channel	
July 11	Alphas	Syfy	
July 13	Legend Quest	Syfy	
July 13	Dance Moms	Lifetime	
July 13	Roseanne's Nuts	Lifetime	
July 13	The Franchise	Showtime	
July 14	Sweet Home Alabama	CMT	
July 14	Texas Women	CMT	
July 15	PrankStars	Disney Channel	
July 17	Bar Rescue	Spike	
July 17	Big Rich Texas	Style Network	
July 17	Heat Seekers	Food Network	
July 19	Awkward	MTV	
July 19	It's Worth What?	NBC	
July 19	Ludo Bites America	Sundance TV	
July 19	Web Therapy	Showtime	
July 22	NTSF:SD:SUV::	Adult Swim	
July 24	Same Name	CBS	
July 31	Against the Wall	Lifetime	
August 1	Secret Mountain Fort Awesome	Cartoon Network	
August 2	Take the Money & Run	ABC	
August 5	Friends with Benefits	NBC	
August 7	Curiosity	Discovery Channel	
August 9	Scaredy Squirrel	Cartoon Network	
August 12	Strike Back	Cinemax	
August 15	The Lying Game	ABC Family	
August 19	Chemistry	Cinemax	
August 28	I Just Want My Pants Back	MTV	
August 29	PoliticsNation with Al Sharpton	MSNBC	
August 29	Carfellas	Discovery Channel	
September 7	Paranormal Witness	Syfy	
September 12	Anderson Live	Syndication	
September 12	Dish Nation	Syndication	
September 12	Excused	Syndication	
September 12	Right This Minute	Syndication	
September 12	We the People with Gloria Allred	Syndication	
September 13	Ringer	The CW	
September 14	H8R	The CW	
September 14	Free Agents	NBC	
September 14	Up All Night	NBC	
September 15	The Secret Circle	The CW	
September 17	Killer Instinct	Cloo	
September 17	Weekends with Alex Witt	MSNBC	
September 18	On the Spot	Syndication	
September 19	The Bill Cunningham Show	Syndication	
September 19	The Jeremy Kyle Show	Syndication	
September 19	Kung Fu Panda: Legends of Awesomeness	Nickelodeon	
September 19	Lifechangers	The CW	
September 19	The Playboy Club	NBC	
September 19	2 Broke Girls	CBS	
September 20	Unforgettable	CBS	
September 20	New Girl	Fox	
September 21	The X Factor	Fox	
September 21	Revenge	ABC	
September 22	Charlie's Angels	ABC	
September 22	Whitney	NBC	
September 22	Prime Suspect	NBC	
September 22	Person of Interest	CBS	
September 23	A Gifted Man	CBS	
September 25	Dirty Soap	E!	
September 25	Pan Am	ABC	
September 26	The Chew	ABC	
September 26	Emeril's Table	Hallmark Channel	
September 26	Hart of Dixie	The CW	
September 26	Last Shot with Judge Gunn	Syndication	
September 26	Terra Nova	Fox	
September 28	Suburgatory	ABC	
September 29	How to Be a Gentleman	CBS	
September 30	Jessie	Disney Channel	
September 30	Search for the Worst Dressed	Style Network	
October 2	Around the World in 80 Ways	History	
October 2	China, IL	Adult Swim	
October 2	Homeland	Showtime	
October 3	Erin Burnett OutFront	CNN	
October 5	American Horror Story	FX	
October 5	Penn & Teller Tell a Lie	Discovery Channel	
October 6	Gabriel Iglesias Presents Stand Up Revolution	Comedy Central	
October 10	The A-List: Dallas	Logo	
October 10	American Guns	Discovery Channel	
October 10	Enlightened	HBO	
October 10	Oprah's Lifeclass	Oprah Winfrey Network	
October 10	The Rosie Show	Oprah Winfrey Network	
October 11	Last Man Standing	ABC	
October 11	Reed Between the Lines	BET	
October 15	Welcome to Sweetie Pie's	Oprah Winfrey Network	
October 16	Super Soul Sunday	Oprah Winfrey Network	
October 16	Talking Dead	AMC	
October 18	Man Up!	ABC	
October 19	American Hoggers	A&E	
October 21	Boss	Starz	
October 21	My Extreme Animal Phobia	Animal Planet	
October 23	Glam Fairy	Style Network	
October 23	Once Upon a Time	ABC	
October 24	Monster In-Laws	A&E	
October 25	Flip Men	Spike	
October 25	Homicide Hunter	Investigation Discovery	
October 27	Good Vibes	MTV	
October 28	Grimm	NBC	
October 29	The Incredible Dr. Pol	Nat Geo Wild	
October 30	Allen Gregory	Fox	
October 31	Rock Center with Brian Williams	NBC	
November 4	Bad Sex	Logo	
November 6	Hell on Wheels	AMC	
November 9	Coast Guard Alaska	The Weather Channel	
November 11	Green Lantern: The Animated Series	Cartoon Network	
November 14	Now with Alex Wagner	MSNBC	
November 17	Big Shrimpin'	History	
November 21	You Deserve It	ABC	
November 25	Tyler Perry's For Better or Worse	TBS	
November 30	The Exes	TV Land	
November 30	I Hate My Teenage Daughter	Fox	
December 1	Weed Wars	Discovery Channel	
December 2	Austin & Ally	Disney Channel	
December 6	Storage Wars: Texas	A&E	
December 9	Invention USA	History	
December 11	Luck	HBO	
December 15	Impractical Jokers	truTV	
December 19	Who's Still Standing?	NBC	
December 20	Best in the Business	Discovery Channel	

=== Entering syndication this year ===
Show	Seasons	In Production	Source
A.N.T. Farm	July 4, 2011 - June 30, 2018	Yes	
Futurama	September 12, 2011 - September 6, 2014	Yes	
It's Always Sunny in Philadelphia	September 12, 2011 - January 29, 2016	Yes	
Kickin' It	September 5, 2011 - August 28, 2020	Yes	
Jake and the Never Land Pirates	April 4, 2011 - August 30, 2019	Yes	
Jessie	October 10, 2011 - December 31, 2025	Yes	
30 Rock	September 12, 2011 - June 19, 2016	Yes	
'Til Death	September 12, 2011 - June 7, 2015	No	
So Random!	August 29, 2011 - February 25, 2018	No	
The Big Bang Theory	September 19, 2011-present	Yes	

=== Changes of network affiliation ===
Show	Moved from	Moved to	Source
BBC World News America	BBC America	BBC World News	
Torchwood	BBC America	Starz	
Countdown with Keith Olbermann	MSNBC	Current TV	
Damages	FX	Audience Network	
Dangerous Encounters with Brady Barr	Nat Geo	Nat Geo Wild	
Can You Teach My Alligator Manners?	Playhouse Disney	Disney Jr.	
Tasty Time with ZeFronk	Playhouse Disney	Disney Jr.	
Mickey Mouse Clubhouse	Playhouse Disney	Disney Jr.	
Deliver Me	Discovery Health	Oprah Winfrey Network	
Mystery Diagnosis	Discovery Health	Oprah Winfrey Network	
911: The Bronx	Discovery Health	Discovery Fit & Health	
Dr. G: Medical Examiner	Discovery Health	Discovery Fit & Health	
I'm Pregnant and...	Discovery Health	Discovery Fit & Health	
Untold Stories of the ER	Discovery Health	Discovery Fit & Health	
Bay City Blues	NBC	ESPN Classic	
Southland	NBC	TNT	
The Game	The CW	BET	
Lou Dobbs Tonight	CNN	Fox Business Network	
Power Rangers	ABC Kids	Nickelodeon	
Miss America	TLC	ABC	
Billboard Music Awards	Fox	ABC	
Secret Millionaire	Fox	ABC	
America's Most Wanted	Fox	Lifetime	
WWE Tough Enough	UPN	USA Network	
The Backyardigans	Nickelodeon	Nick Jr. Channel	
Little Robots	Cartoon Network	Qubo	
Peppa Pig	Cartoon Network	Nick Jr. Channel	
120 Minutes	MTV	MTV2	
LazyTown	Nick Jr. Channel	PBS Kids Sprout	

=== Returning this year ===
The following shows returned with new episodes after being canceled previously:

Show	Last aired	Previous network	New title	New network	Returning	Source
God, the Devil and Bob	2000	NBC	Same	Adult Swim	January 8	
The Game	2009	The CW	Same	BET	January 11	
Lou Dobbs Tonight	2009	CNN	Same	Fox Business Network	March 14	
WWE Tough Enough	2004	UPN	Same	USA Network	April 4	
Loonatics Unleashed	2007	Kids WB	The Looney Tunes Show	Cartoon Network	May 3	
Billboard Music Award	2006	Fox	Same	ABC	May 22	
Lingo	2007	GSN	Same	Same	June 6	
Chaotic	2010	Cartoon Network	Same	Same	June 14	
ThunderCats	1989	Syndication	Same	Cartoon Network	July 29	
120 Minutes	2003	MTV	Same	MTV2	July 30	
Pop-Up Video	2002	VH1	Same	Same	October 3	
Beavis and Butt-head	1997	MTV	Same	Same	October 27	
Fear Factor	2006	NBC	Same	Same	December 12	
Bay City Blues	1983	NBC	Same	ESPN Classic	December 12	

=== Milestone episodes ===
Show	Network	Episode #	Episode title	Episode air date	Source
Supernanny	ABC	100th	"The George Family"	January 7	
Brothers & Sisters	ABC	100th	"Safe At Home"	January 16	
The Tonight Show with Jay Leno	NBC	4,000th	Simon Cowell, Jeff Gordon & Travis Barker	March 2	
The Penguins of Madagascar	Nickelodeon	100th	"Pets Peeved"	September 24	
Wizards of Waverly Place	Disney Channel	100th	"Wizards of Apartment 13B"	October 7	N/A
Beavis and Butt-Head	MTV	200th	"Crying"	October 27	

=== Ending this year ===
Date	Show	Network	Debut	Status	Source
January 2	Sonny with a Chance	Disney Channel	2009	Ended	
January 4	Caprica	Syfy	2010	Cancelled	
January 9	Sarah Palin's Alaska	TLC	2010	Cancelled	
January 11	1 vs. 100	GSN	2006	Cancelled	
January 13	Pictureka!	The Hub	2010	Cancelled	
January 16	Hannah Montana	Disney Channel	2006	Cancelled	
January 17	WordWorld	PBS Kids	2007	Cancelled	
January 18	Glory Daze	TBS	2010	Cancelled	
January 18	Life Unexpected	The CW	2010	Cancelled	
January 21	Medium	CBS	2005	Cancelled	
January 22	Ghost Lab	Discovery Channel	2009	Cancelled	
January 24	Robotomy	Cartoon Network	2010	Cancelled	
January 31	Lie to Me	Fox	2009	Cancelled	
February 9	Human Target	Fox	2010	Cancelled	
February 9	Friday Night Lights	The 101 Network	2006	Ended	
February 9	Live to Dance	CBS	2011	Cancelled	
February 13	Ooh, Aah & You	Playhouse Disney	2005	Cancelled	
February 17	$#*! My Dad Says	CBS	2010	Cancelled	
March 7	Greek	ABC Family	2007	Ended	
March 8	PitchMen	Discovery Channel	2009	Ended	
March 11	The Cape	NBC	2011	Cancelled	
March 11	The Defenders	CBS	2010	Cancelled	
March 15	V	ABC	2009	Cancelled	
March 18	Supernanny (returned in 2020)	ABC	2005	Ended	
March 20	Big Love	HBO	2006	Ended	
March 20	Detroit 1-8-7	ABC	2010	Cancelled	
March 21	Skins	MTV	2011	Cancelled	
March 24	Are You Smarter than a 5th Grader? (returned in 2015, 2019 and 2024)	Syndication	2007	Cancelled	
March 25	Comedy Central Presents	Comedy Central	1998	Ended	
March 26	Olivia	Nick Jr.	2009	Cancelled	
March 26	God, the Devil and Bob	Adult Swim	2000	Cancelled	
April 1	Working Class	CMT	2011	Cancelled	
April 4	The Electric Company	PBS Kids	2009	Cancelled	
April 5	Lights Out	FX	2011	Cancelled	
April 5	No Ordinary Family	ABC	2010	Cancelled	
April 6	Off the Map	ABC	2011	Cancelled	
April 6	Mr. Sunshine	ABC	2011	Cancelled	
April 7	Perfect Couples	NBC	2010	Cancelled	
April 9	Sym-Bionic Titan	Cartoon Network	2010	Cancelled	
April 21	The Paul Reiser Show	NBC	2011	Cancelled	
April 22	Gigantic	TeenNick	2010	Cancelled	
April 29	Bar Karma	Current TV	2011	Cancelled	
May 1	America's Next Great Restaurant	NBC	2011	Cancelled	
May 3	My Life as Liz	MTV	2010	Cancelled	
May 6	The Suite Life on Deck	Disney Channel	2008	Ended	
May 8	Brothers & Sisters	ABC	2006	Cancelled	
May 9	Stargate Universe	Syfy	2009	Cancelled	
May 11	Better with You	ABC	2010	Cancelled	
May 12	Outsourced	NBC	2010	Cancelled	
May 13	Smallville	The CW	2001	Ended	
May 13	Silent Library	MTV	2009	Cancelled	
May 15	The Family Crews	BET	2010	Cancelled	
May 16	Mad Love	CBS	2011	Cancelled	
May 17	Hellcats	The CW	2010	Cancelled	
May 19	I'm Alive	Animal Planet	2009	Cancelled	
May 21	Chase	NBC	2010	Cancelled	
May 21	Running Wilde	Fox	2010	Cancelled	
May 23	The Event	NBC	2010	Cancelled	
May 23	The Chicago Code	Fox	2011	Cancelled	
May 25	Criminal Minds: Suspect Behavior	CBS	2011	Cancelled	
May 25	The Oprah Winfrey Show	Syndication	1986	Ended	
May 25	Judge Jeanine Pirro	Syndication	2008	Cancelled	
May 27	Don't Forget the Lyrics! (returned in 2022)	Syndication	2007	Cancelled	
May 28	Unwrapped	Food Network	2001	Cancelled	
May 30	The Hard Times of RJ Berger	MTV	2010	Cancelled	
May 31	The Nutshack	Myx	2007	Cancelled	
June 3	Drew Carey's Improv-A-Ganza	GSN	2011	Cancelled	
June 10	Camelot	Starz	2011	Cancelled	
June 18	The Mighty B!	Nickelodeon	2008	Cancelled	
June 20	United States of Tara	Showtime	2009	Cancelled	
June 24	Jamie Oliver's Food Revolution	ABC	2010	Cancelled	
June 25	Dessert First with Anne Thornton	Food Network	2010	Cancelled	
June 26	Law & Order: Criminal Intent	USA Network	2001	Ended	
June 30	Glenn Beck	Fox News Channel	2006	Ended	
July 6	Men of a Certain Age	TNT	2009	Cancelled	
July 11	Law & Order: LA	NBC	2010	Cancelled	
July 15	Jimmy Two-Shoes	Disney XD	2009	Cancelled	
July 16	Hot Wheels Battle Force 5	Cartoon Network	2009	Cancelled	
July 20	Web Soup	G4	2009	Cancelled	
July 21	Love Bites	NBC	2011	Cancelled	
July 23	G.I. Joe: Renegades	The Hub	2010	Cancelled	
August 1	Lingo (returned in 2023)	GSN	1987	Cancelled	
August 4	In the Arena	CNN	2010	Cancelled	
August 9	Aftermath with William Shatner	The Biography Channel	2010	Cancelled	
August 12	Lopez Tonight	TBS	2009	Cancelled	
August 14	Same Name	CBS	2011	Cancelled	
August 16	Hawthorne	TNT	2009	Cancelled	
August 16	The Mo'Nique Show	BET	2009	Cancelled	
August 16	Memphis Beat	TNT	2010	Cancelled	
August 16	The Nine Lives of Chloe King	ABC Family	2011	Cancelled	
August 17	State of Georgia	ABC Family	2011	Cancelled	
August 20	True Jackson, VP	Nickelodeon	2008	Ended	
August 21	Ni Hao, Kai-Lan	Nickelodeon	2008	Cancelled	
August 25	Expedition Impossible	ABC	2011	Cancelled	
August 28	The Marriage Ref	NBC	2010	Cancelled	
September 6	Proving Ground	G4	2011	Cancelled	
September 6	Take the Money & Run	ABC	2011	Cancelled	
September 7	Minute to Win It (returned in 2013)	NBC	2010	Cancelled	
September 7	Rescue Me	FX	2004	Ended	
September 9	Friends with Benefits	NBC	2011	Cancelled	
September 11	Entourage	HBO	2004	Ended	
September 12	Kate Plus 8	TLC	2010	Cancelled	
September 13	It's Worth What?	NBC	2011	Cancelled	
September 14	Deadliest Warrior	Spike	2009	Cancelled	
September 15	LA Ink	TLC	2007	Cancelled	
September 21	Destroy Build Destroy	Cartoon Network	2009	Cancelled	
September 21	Dude, What Would Happen	Cartoon Network	2009	Cancelled	
September 23	All My Children (returned in 2013)	ABC	1970	Cancelled	
September 29	The Problem Solverz	Cartoon Network	2011	Cancelled	
October 3	The Playboy Club	NBC	2011	Cancelled	
October 5	Free Agents	NBC	2011	Cancelled	
October 5	H8R	The CW	2011	Cancelled	
October 14	The Super Hero Squad Show	Cartoon Network	2009	Cancelled	
October 14	Peep and the Big Wide World	Public television syndication	2004	Cancelled	
November 7	Glenn Martin, DDS	Nickelodeon	2009	Cancelled	
November 10	Charlie's Angels	ABC	2011	Cancelled	
November 12	Back at the Barnyard	Nickelodeon	2007	Cancelled	
November 18	Batman: The Brave and the Bold	Cartoon Network	2008	Cancelled	
November 18	Chemistry	Cinemax	2011	Cancelled	
November 18	Tyler Perry's Meet the Browns	TBS	2009	Cancelled	
November 28	The Sing-Off (returned in 2013)	NBC	2009	Cancelled	
December 3	Poker After Dark (returned in 2013)	NBC	2007	Cancelled	
December 6	Man Up	ABC	2011	Cancelled	
December 9	I'm in the Band	Disney XD	2009	Cancelled	
December 15	The Joy Behar Show	HLN	2009	Ended	
December 18	Allen Gregory	Fox	2011	Cancelled	
December 19	Terra Nova	Fox	2011	Cancelled	
December 20	Noodle and Doodle	Sprout	2010	Cancelled	
December 22	Weed Wars	Discovery Channel	2011	Cancelled	
December 26	You Deserve It	ABC	2011	Cancelled	
December 29	Good Vibes	MTV	2011	Cancelled	
December 29	Beavis and Butt-Head (returned in 2022)	MTV	1993	Cancelled	
December 30	American Morning	CNN	2001	Cancelled	

=== Made-for-TV movies, television specials, and miniseries ===
Premiere date	Title	Channel	Ref.
March 12	Best Player	Nickelodeon	
March 25	The Suite Life Movie	Disney Channel	
April 15	Lemonade Mouth	Disney Channel	
April 19	Sharpay's Fabulous Adventure	Disney Channel	
June 11	iParty with Victorious	Nickelodeon	
July 9	A Fairly Odd Movie: Grow Up, Timmy Turner!	Nickelodeon	
August 5	Phineas and Ferb the Movie: Across the 2nd Dimension	Disney Channel	
September 12	Mickey Mouse Clubhouse: Space Adventure	Disney Channel	
November 11	Geek Charming	Disney Channel	
November 23	Level Up	Cartoon Network	
December 2	Good Luck Charlie, It's Christmas!	Disney Channel	

== Awards ==
Category	Critics' Choice Awards June 20, 2011	TCA Awards August 6, 2011	Emmy Awards September 18, 2011	Golden Globe Awards January 15, 2012	SAG Awards January 29, 2012
Best Drama Series	Mad Men			Homeland	Boardwalk Empire
Best Comedy Series	Modern Family				
Best Actor – Drama	Jon Hamm – Mad Men	Jon Hamm – Mad Men	Kyle Chandler – Friday Night Lights	Kelsey Grammer – Boss	Steve Buscemi – Boardwalk Empire
Best Actress – Drama	Julianna Margulies – The Good Wife	Jon Hamm – Mad Men	Juliana Margulies – The Good Wife	Claire Danes – Homeland	Jessica Lange – American Horror Story
Best Supporting Actor – Drama	John Noble – Fringe	Jon Hamm – Mad Men	Peter Dinklage – Game of Thrones		—N/a
Best Supporting Actress – Drama	Christina Hendricks – Mad Men – Margo Martindale – Justified	Jon Hamm – Mad Men	Margo Martindale – Justified	Jessica Lange – American Horror Story	—N/a
Best Actor – Comedy	Jim Parsons – The Big Bang Theory	Ty Burrell – Modern Family – Nick Offerman – Parks and Recreation	Jim Parsons – The Big Bang Theory	Matt LeBlanc – Episodes	Alec Baldwin – 30 Rock
Best Actress – Comedy	Tina Fey – 30 Rock	Ty Burrell – Modern Family – Nick Offerman – Parks and Recreation	Melissa McCarthy – Mike & Molly	Laura Dern – Enlightened	Betty White – Hot in Cleveland
Best Supporting Actor – Comedy	Neil Patrick Harris – How I Met Your Mother	Ty Burrell – Modern Family – Nick Offerman – Parks and Recreation	Ty Burrell – Modern Family	—N/a (Note: The Golden Globe award for Best Supporting Actor is a combined award. Nominees include actors from drama and comedy series, TV films, and miniseries. The winner is only listed once, based on the genre of the series they are a part of.)	—N/a
Best Supporting Actress – Comedy	Busy Philipps – Cougar Town	Ty Burrell – Modern Family – Nick Offerman – Parks and Recreation	Julie Bowen – Modern Family	—N/a	—N/a
Best TV Film or Miniseries	—N/a	Sherlock	Downton Abbey		—N/a
Best Actor – TV Film or Miniseries	—N/a	—N/a	Barry Pepper – The Kennedys	Idris Elba – Luther	Paul Giamatti – Too Big to Fail
Best Actress – TV Film or Miniseries	—N/a	—N/a	Kate Winslet – Mildred Pierce		
Best Supporting Actor – TV Film or Miniseries	—N/a	—N/a	Guy Pearce – Mildred Pierce	—N/a	—N/a
Best Supporting Actress – TV Film or Miniseries	—N/a	—N/a	Maggie Smith – Downton Abbey	—N/a	—N/a

== Networks and services ==
=== Launches ===
Network name	Type	Launch Date	Notes	Source
VIETV	Cable television	Unknown		
Antenna TV	Cable television	January 1		
Oprah Winfrey Network	Cable television	January 1		
3net	Cable television	February 13		
Amazon Prime Instant Video	Subscription video-on-demand/OTT streaming	February 22		
Encore Espanol	Cable television	August 1		
One World Sports	Cable television	August 25		
Longhorn Network	Cable television	August 26		
FNX	Cable television	September 25		
Bounce TV	Cable television	September 26		
Semillitas	Cable television	October 24		
WeatherNationTV	Cable television	October 27		

=== Conversions and rebrandings ===
Old network name	New network name	Type	Conversion Date	Notes	Source
Discovery Health Channel	Oprah Winfrey Network	Cable television	January 1		
Fox Soccer Channel	Fox Soccer	Cable television	Unknown		
HD Theater	Velocity	Cable television	Unknown		
Encore Wam	Encore Family	Cable television	Unknown		
Encore Mystery	Encore Suspense	Cable television	Unknown		
FitTV	Discovery Fit & Health	Cable television	February 1		
CBS College Sports Network	CBS Sports Network	Cable television	April 4		
Si TV	NuvoTV	Cable television	July 4		
Sleuth	Cloo	Cable television	August 15		
VeneMovies	ViendoMovies	Cable television	September 6		
The 101 Network	Audience Network	Cable television	Unknown		
History Channel International	H2	Cable television	September 26		
AmericanLife TV Network	YouToo TV	Cable television	September 27		

=== Closures ===
Network	Type	Launch Date	Notes	Source
Wedding Central	Cable television	July 1		
The 3 from Epix	Cable television	December 31		

== Television stations ==
=== Stations changing network affiliation ===
The following is a list of television stations making noteworthy network affiliation changes during 2011.

Date	Market	Station	Channel	Prior affiliation	New affiliation	Source
January 1	Los Angeles	KCET-TV	28.1	PBS	Public independent	
April 18	Salinas/Monterey	KSBW	8.2	independent	ABC	
April 27	Albany, Georgia	WALB-DT2	10.2	This TV	ABC	
May 1	Toccoa, Georgia	WUGA-TV	32.1	independent (as WNEG-TV)	PBS/GPB	
July 1	Evansville, Indiana	WEVV-DT2	44.2	MyNetworkTV	Fox (primary); MyNetworkTV (secondary)	
July 1	Evansville, Indiana	WTVW	7.1	Fox	independent	
July 1	Orlando	WMFE-TV	24.1	PBS	V-me	
August 1	Buffalo, New York	WBBZ-TV	67.1	This TV (as WNGS)	Me-TV	
August 1	Fort Wayne, Indiana	WFFT-TV	55.1	Fox	independent	
August 1	Fort Wayne, Indiana	WISE-TV	33.2	MyNetworkTV	Fox (primary); MyNetworkTV (secondary)	
September 1	Springfield, Missouri	KRBK	49.1	MyNetworkTV	Fox (primary); MyNetworkTV (secondary)	
September 1	Springfield, Missouri	KOZL-TV	27.1	Fox (as KSFX-TV)	independent	
September 1	Terre Haute, Indiana	WAWV	38.1	Fox (as WFXW)	ABC	
September 1	Terre Haute, Indiana	WTHI-DT2	10.2	TheCoolTV	Fox (primary); MyNetworkTV (secondary)	
September 1	Boise, Idaho	KNIN-TV	9.1	The CW	Fox	
September 1	Boise, Idaho	KTRV-TV	12.1	Fox	independent	
September 12	Boise, Idaho	KYUU-LP; KBOI-DT2	35; 2.2	RTV	The CW	
September 12	Victoria, Texas	KUNU-LP; KAVU-DT3	41; 25.3	MyNetworkTV	CBS	
September 19	Derry, New Hampshire	WBIN-TV	50.1	MyNetworkTV	independent	
September 19	Boston, Massachusetts	WSBK-TV	38.1	independent station	MyNetworkTV	
September 29	Santa Rosa, CA	KEMO-TV	50.1	MeTV (as KFTY)	Azteca America	

=== Station launches ===
Date	Market	Station	Channel	Affiliation	Ref.
February 18	Erie, Pennsylvania	WLEP-LD	9.1	RetroTV	
February 22	Farmington, Missouri	KDKZ-LD	18.1	RetroTV	
February 27	Traverse City/Cadillac, Michigan	WMNN-LD	26.1	MI News 26	
June 24	Evansville, Indiana	W47EE-D	47.1	Fox (primary); MyNetworkTV (secondary)	
September 1	Juneau, Alaska	KJUD-DT3	8.3	Fox	
September 22	Evansville, Indiana	WTSN-CD	20.1	Me-TV	
September 29	Topeka, Kansas	KSQA	12.1	Independent	

=== Station closures ===
Date	Market	Station	Channel	Affiliation	Sign-on debut	Source
March 31	Hagåtña, Guam	KTKB-LD	26	The CW/Universal Sports	April 20, 2009	
December 9	Davenport, Iowa	WBQD-LP	26	MyNetworkTV	June 1, 2002	
December 31	Frederiksted, U.S. Virgin Islands	WEON-LP	60	Fox	2005	

== Births ==
Date	Name	Notability
April 22	Violet McGraw	Actress
August 10	Jeremy Maguire	Actor
October 6	Ryan Kaji	Actor

== Deaths ==
=== January ===
Date	Name	Age	Notability	Source
January 2	Anne Francis	80	Actress (Honey West, Dallas, Riptide)	
January 10	John Dye	47	Actor (Touched by an Angel)	
January 10	Margaret Whiting	86	Singer and actress (Those Whiting Girls)	
January 11	David Nelson	74	Actor and producer (The Adventures of Ozzie and Harriet)	
January 12	Paul Picerni	88	Actor (The Untouchables)	
January 13	Dan Filie	56	Screenwriter (Spartacus: Blood and Sand), producer (Hercules: The Legendary Journeys, Xena: Warrior Princess)	
January 15	Susannah York	72	Actress (Jane Eyre)	
January 17	Don Kirshner	76	Music executive, producer, and host (Don Kirshner's Rock Concert, ABC In Concert, The Monkees)	
January 19	Bob Young	87	News reporter/anchor (ABC Evening News, WCBS-TV)	
January 20	Bruce Gordon	94	Actor (The Untouchables)	
January 20	Liz Dribben	73	Journalist (Dialing for Dollars on WKBW-TV, CBS News)	
January 23	Jack LaLanne	96	Fitness, exercise, and nutrition instructor (The Jack LaLanne Show)	
January 24	David Frye	77	Political impressionist-comedian (The Smothers Brothers Comedy Hour)	
January 26	Stefanie Kowal	69	Former production executive with Universal Television (Centennial, The Four Seasons)	
January 27	Charlie Callas	83	Actor and stand-up comedian (Love, American Style; Switch; Hart To Hart)	
January 30	John Barry	77	British music composer (Eleanor and Franklin, USA Today: The Television Show)	

=== February ===
Date	Name	Age	Notability	Ref.
February 5	Marcia Adams	75	Cooking expert & author, host of Marcia Adams' Kitchen (PBS)	
February 5	Peggy Rea	89	Character actress (The Waltons and The Dukes of Hazzard)	
February 9	Robert F. Schenkkan Sr.	93	Public broadcasting executive (co-founder of KLRN/San Antonio) and advocate (advised President Johnson on Public Broadcasting Act of 1967)	
February 10	Jon Petrovich	63	Former local news reporter (WHAS-TV), news director (WDIV-TV, WBAL-TV), and executive with CNN	
February 11	Tom Carnegie	91	Indianapolis radio/TV sportscaster (WFBM/WRTV, 1953–85), public address voice of Indianapolis Motor Speedway	
February 12	Betty Garrett	91	Actress, singer, dancer and comedian (Laverne & Shirley and All in the Family)	
February 12	Kenneth Mars	75	Comedic actor (Malcolm in the Middle, Fernwood Tonight, He & She) and voice actor (The Jetsons, Uncle Croc's Block, The Little Mermaid)	
February 14	John Strauss	90	Musician-composer (themes to Car 54, Where Are You? and The Phil Silvers Show; sound editing on The Amazing Howard Hughes)	
February 16	Len Lesser	88	Actor (Uncle Leo on Seinfeld)	
February 17	Bill Monroe	90	Washington, D.C. bureau chief for NBC News, moderator of Meet the Press	
February 18	Nancy Carr	50	American television and PR executive for CBS, Fox and Hallmark Channel	
February 21	Dwayne McDuffie	49	Writer (Ben 10, Ben 10: Alien Force, Ben 10: Ultimate Alien, Static Shock, Justice League/Justice League Unlimited)	
February 28	Jane Russell	89	Actress and TV spokesperson for Playtex	

=== March ===
Date	Name	Age	Notability	Ref.
March 3	Al Morgan	91	Novelist/playwright, producer of Today from 1961 to 1968	
March 4	Annie Fargé	76	French actress (Angel)	
March 4	Frank Chirkinian	84	Director/producer for CBS Sports (including 38 years on Masters golf telecasts)	
March 9	David S. Broder	81	Political columnist (panelist on Meet The Press from 1960 to 2008)	
March 15	James Pritchett	88	Soap opera actor (As the World Turns, The Doctors, Guiding Light)	
March 15	Nate Dogg	41	Hip-hop singer and actor (guest appearances on The Sopranos and The Boondocks)	
March 21	Barry Ackerley	76	Former chairman/CEO of Ackerley Group (TV/radio station ownership)	
March 23	Elizabeth Taylor	79	Actress (Malice in Wonderland, These Old Broads, Divorce His, Divorce Hers; supporting roles on General Hospital, All My Children, North and South)	
March 24	Lanford Wilson	73	Playwright (his play The Hot l Baltimore was adopted for a 1975 TV series)	
March 26	Geraldine Ferraro	75	Politician and television political analyst/commentator (Crossfire)	
March 26	Jobie Martin	93	Television/radio personality, businessman, and educator (host of The Jobie Martin Show at WLBT/Jackson, Mississippi)	
March 26	Larry Fraiberg	89	TV executive (VP/GM of WTTG and WNEW-TV, president of Metromedia and Group W)	
March 27	DJ Megatron	32	Television/radio personality, presenter, musician and remixer (106 & Park)	
March 28	David Smith	55	President and CEO of Mission Broadcasting	

=== April ===
Date	Name	Age	Notability	Ref.
April 9	Sidney Lumet	86	producer, director, playwright, and screenwriter (Danger, Mama, You Are There, Playhouse 90, Kraft Television Theatre)	
April 14	Jon Cedar	80	Actor (Corporal Langenscheidt on Hogan's Heroes)	
April 16	Sol Saks	100	Comedy writer (My Favorite Husband, Mr. Adams and Eve, I Married Joan; creator of Bewitched)	
April 17	Michael Sarrazin	70	Canadian actor (The Christmas Choir, "The Quickening" episode of Star Trek: Deep Space Nine, 1978 host on Saturday Night Live)	
April 20	Hubert Schlafly	91	Satellite television pioneer, inventor of the teleprompter	
April 20	Madelyn Pugh	90	Comedy series writer/producer (I Love Lucy, The Lucy-Desi Comedy Hour, The Lucy Show, The Mothers-in-Law, Here's Lucy, Alice, Life With Lucy)	
April 21	William J. McCarter Jr.	81	Public television executive (WETA-TV/Washington, WTTW/Chicago), creator of Washington Week in Review and The McLaughlin Group	
April 26	John Cossette	54	Executive producer for the Grammy Award telecasts	
April 26	Phoebe Snow	60	Singer and songwriter (appearances on Reading Rainbow, Roseanne, Saturday Night Live; wrote and performed WDIV/Detroit's "Go 4 It" promos)	
April 26	Roger Gimbel	86	Producer (A War of Children, The Autobiography of Miss Jane Pittman)	
April 27	Marian Mercer	75	Actress (Nancy Bebe on It's a Living)	
April 29	Howard J. Brown	87	Owner, president and founder of United Communications Corporation, an owner of TV stations and newspapers	

=== May ===
Date	Name	Age	Notability	Ref.
May 3	Jackie Cooper	88	Actor (The People's Choice, Hennesey), executive with Screen Gems, director (Hennesey, M*A*S*H, The White Shadow)	
May 4	Sada Thompson	83	Actress (Kate Lawrence on Family, Mrs. Gibbs in 1977 TV production of Our Town)	
May 9	Jeff Gralnick	84	News reporter/producer for CBS; news executive for ABC, NBC, and CNN; executive producer for ABC World News Tonight and NBC Nightly News	
May 10	Burt Reinhardt	91	First president of CNN	
May 10	Mia Amber Davis	36	Plus-size model and actress (appearances in The Tyra Banks Show and Rip the Runway; stand-in for Queen Latifah in the 2007 HBO film Life Support)	
May 10	Norma Zimmer	87	Singer (The Lawrence Welk Show)	
May 11	Tina Gulland	62	Reporter for Washington, D.C. area radio and TV stations and former head of television and radio projects for The Washington Post and co-owned Post-Newsweek Stations	
May 12	Daryl Hawks	38	Sportscaster, WMAQ-TV/Chicago, among other stations	
May 14	Joseph Wershba	90	Reporter/producer with CBS News (See It Now, 60 Minutes)	
May 15	Barbara Stuart	81	Actress (I Led Three Lives, Pete and Gladys, Gomer Pyle, USMC, Our Family Honor, Huff)	
May 19	Phyllis Avery	88	Actress (Meet Mr. McNutley, The Secret Storm)	
May 20	Randy Savage	58	Wrestler, actor (WWE/F and WCW, as "Macho Man Randy Savage"), commercial spokesperson (Slim Jim)	
May 24	Mark Haines	65	Journalist (co-anchor of CNBC's Squawk on the Street and Squawk Box)	
May 25	Paul Splittorff	64	Baseball pitcher and TV color commentator, both for the Kansas City Royals	
May 27	Jeff Conaway	60	Actor (Taxi) and reality show participant (Celebrity Fit Club, Celebrity Rehab with Dr. Drew)	
May 30	Clarice Taylor	93	Actress (Anna Huxtable on The Cosby Show, Harriet on Sesame Street)	
May 30	Robert Foster	72	Writer/producer (Run for Your Life, Knight Rider)	

=== June ===
Date	Name	Age	Notability	Ref.
June 3	Andrew Gold	59	Singer and songwriter, wrote theme songs to The Golden Girls and Mad About You	
June 3	James Arness	88	Actor (Marshal Matt Dillon in Gunsmoke, How the West Was Won, McClain's Law)	
June 7	Leonard B. Stern	87	Producer, director and writer (Get Smart, McMillan and Wife)	
June 10	Art Balinger	96	Character actor (Dragnet 1967, Adam-12)	
June 10	Jim Rodnunsky	54	Camera pioneer (inventor of the cablecam)	
June 15	Bob Banner	89	Director/producer (The Dinah Shore Chevy Show, The Carol Burnett Show, Candid Camera, Solid Gold, Star Search)	
June 18	Clarence Clemons	69	Saxophonist (member of E Street Band) and actor (appearances on Diff'rent Strokes, The Wire, My Wife and Kids)	
June 20	Ryan Dunn	34	Reality TV participant, stuntman, actor (Jackass, Viva La Bam)	
June 23	Fred Steiner	88	Television composer (Perry Mason, Star Trek, The Twilight Zone)	
June 23	Peter Falk	83	Actor (Columbo)	
June 25	Alice Playten	63	Actress/singer (The Lost Saucer)	
June 25	Nick Charles	64	Sportscaster (co-anchor of Sports Tonight; boxing analyst for Showtime)	
June 27	Elaine Stewart	81	Actress (appearances on Bat Masterson, Burke's Law and Perry Mason) and game show hostess (Gambit, High Rollers)	

=== July ===
Date	Name	Age	Notability	Ref.
July 1	Bud Grant	79	Programming executive with NBC and CBS, independent producer	
July 8	Sam Denoff	83	Comedy screenwriter, creator and producer (co-writer for The Dick Van Dyke Show, co-creator of That Girl)	
July 12	Sherwood Schwartz	94	Producer and writer (creator of Gilligan's Island and The Brady Bunch)	
July 21	Bruce Sundlun	91	Politician (Governor of Rhode Island) and former CEO of The Outlet Company, which later became Outlet Communications	
July 22	Tom Aldredge	83	Actor (Ryan's Hope, The Sopranos)	
July 23	Amy Winehouse	27	English singer and songwriter	
July 24	G. D. Spradlin	90	Actor (Gomer Pyle, USMC, I Spy, Dragnet, War and Remembrance)	
July 26	Elmer Lower	98	Journalist and news executive (president of ABC News, 1963–74)	

=== August ===
Date	Name	Age	Notability	Ref.
August 3	Annette Charles	63	Actress and dancer (appearances in Man from Atlantis, Centennial, Magnum, P.I., The Flying Nun, Gunsmoke, Barnaby Jones)	
August 3	Bubba Smith	66	Football player, actor (appearances in Married... with Children) and spokesperson (Miller Lite's "Great Taste, Less Filling" ad campaign)	
August 8	Carolyn Chambers	79	Founder/CEO of Chambers Communications Corporation, founder of Liberty Communications	
August 13	Vic Dunlop	62	Comedian, actor (Harper Valley PTA, Make Me Laugh)	
August 19	Lane Venardos	67	News producer for CBS News and consultant on CBS' reality-based programs	
August 20	Patricia Hardy	79	Actress (The Loretta Young Show, Perry Mason, Lassie, Schlitz Playhouse of Stars)	
August 24	Mike Flanagan	59	Pitcher and announcer for the Baltimore Orioles	

=== September ===
Date	Name	Age	Notability	Ref.
September 5	Charles S. Dubin	92	Director (Omnibus, Twenty-One, Lou Grant, M*A*S*H, Square One TV)	
September 6	Donald F. Taffner Sr.	80	Producer and distributor (Three's Company, Too Close for Comfort, The Benny Hill Show)	
September 7	Gardner Baldwin	60	Actor, known for his role as Carl Ziktor / Grimlord in VR Troopers	
September 8	Mary Fickett	83	Actress (All My Children)	
September 11	Andy Whitfield	39	Welsh actor (Spartacus: Blood and Sand)	
September 15	Frances Bay	92	Actress (Seinfeld, Happy Days, The Middle)	

=== October ===
Date	Name	Age	Notability	Ref.
October 2	Don Lapre	47	Infomercial pitchman	
October 3	Arthur C. Nielsen Jr.	92	President (1957–75) and chairman (1975–83) of the ACNielsen ratings and marketing research service	
October 4	Doris Belack	85	Actress (One Life to Live, Law & Order, Law & Order: Special Victims Unit)	
October 4	Joe Aceti	76	Director for ABC Sports, CBS Sports, and Fox Sports	
October 5	Charles Napier	75	Character actor (The Oregon Trail, Murder, She Wrote) and voice actor (The Simpsons, The Critic)	
October 5	Steve Jobs	56	Founder, and later CEO, of Apple Inc. (Oversaw the creation of, and helped adapted, television programs and other media platforms, for use on Apple's iPod, iPad, Apple TV, and iPhone devices)	
October 15	Sue Mengers	79	Entertainment talent/booking agent and manager for television, film and music performers	
October 16	Dan Wheldon	33	British IndyCar Series auto racer (two-time Indianapolis 500 winner), part-time IRL analyst for Versus, guest voice appearance in Hot Wheels Battle Force 5	
October 22	Robert Pierpoint	86	Correspondent for CBS News (1951–90), voiceover appearance on M*A*S*H's series finale	
October 26	Dan Burke	82	President and CEO of Capital Cities Communications and ABC	
October 31	Gilbert Cates	77	Executive Producer for the Academy Awards telecasts and a member of the academy's Board of Governors, president of the Directors Guild of America, composer, and dean of the UCLA School of Theater, Film and Television	

=== November ===
Date	Name	Age	Notability	Ref.
November 2	Sid Melton	94	Actor (Green Acres, Make Room for Daddy, Captain Midnight)	
November 4	Andy Rooney	92	Journalist and writer (60 Minutes)	
November 8	Hal Bruno	83	Reporter and political correspondent for ABC News from 1978 to 1999	
November 8	Heavy D	44	Rapper/singer-songwriter, music producer, record label executive, and actor (composed and performed the theme songs to In Living Color and Mad TV)	
November 21	Jean Yoo	36	Newsanchor for KSCI/Los Angeles	
November 23	Tim Cuprisin	53	Television/radio critic and reviewer for the Milwaukee Journal Sentinel and OnMilwaukee.com	
November 24	James Jespersen	77	Physicist and co-inventor of closed captioning	

=== December ===
Date	Name	Age	Notability	Ref.
December 1	Alan Sues	85	Comedian and actor (Rowan & Martin's Laugh-In)	
December 7	Harry Morgan	96	Actor (M*A*S*H, Dragnet, Pete and Gladys)	
December 11	Bonnie Prudden	97	Physical fitness instructor, author, and health advocate (Host of her own series and contributor to The Today Show)	
December 11	Susan Gordon	62	Actress (Notable role as the handicapped girl in the 1962 Twilight Zone episode "The Fugitive")	
December 28	Kaye Stevens	79	Singer/actress (regular role on Days of Our Lives)	
December 30	Doug Sellars	50	Producer and executive with Fox Sports	

== See also ==
- 2011 in the United States
- List of American films of 2011
