= List of programs broadcast by Lifetime =

Lifetime is an American basic cable channel that features programming geared toward women or features women in lead roles. As of November 2023, it is available to approximately 63,000,000 pay television households in the United States, down from its 2011 peak of 100,000,000 households.

== Current programming ==
=== Original programming ===
==== Reality ====
- Designing Spaces (2005)
- Military Makeover with Montel (2015)
- Meet Marry Murder (2022)
- TLC Forever (2023)
- Prison Brides (2024)
- I Wasn't Expecting a Baby! (2024)
- Theresa Caputo: Beyond The Readings (2024)
- Gypsy Rose: Life After Lockup (2024)
- Outrageous Love with Nene Leakes (2024)
- Parents Gone Wild (2024)
- Dr. Pimple Popper: Breaking Out (2025)
- The 6000 lb Diaries with Dr. Now (2025)
- A Sorority Mom's Guide to Rush (2025)
- The Chrisleys: Back to Reality (2025)

==== Talk shows ====
- The Balancing Act (2008)

=== Syndicated programming ===
- Married at First Sight: Australia (2020)
- Rizzoli & Isles (2020)
- Castle (2021)
- Married at First Sight: UK (2023)
- The Rookie (2024)
- NCIS (2024)

==== Religious programming ====
- Amazing Facts with Doug Batchelor
- Creflo Dollar
- Dr. David Jeremiah
- Harvest with Pastor Greg Laurie
- Life Today with James & Betty Robison
- Joel Osteen
- Joyce Meyer Ministries: Enjoying Everyday Life

== Former programming ==
=== Original programming ===
- Dr. Ruth (1984–1991)
- Mother's Day with Joan Lunden (1984–89)
- Regis Philbin's Lifestyles (1984–89)
- What Every Baby Knows (1984–1998)
- Attitudes (1986–92)
- This Evening (1989–90)
- Rodeo Drive (1990)
- Supermarket Sweep (1990–95)
- Shop 'til You Drop (1991–94)
- Born Lucky (1992–93)
- Intimate Portrait (1994–2005)
- Debt (1996–1998)
- Kids These Days (1996–98)
- Three Blind Dates (1996–97)
- Denise Austin's Daily Workout (1997–2008)
- Beyond Chance (1999–2002)
- Ruby (1999)
- Who Knows You Best? (2000–01)
- Speaking of Women's Health (2001, 2003–04)
- Head 2 Toe (2003–08)
- I Do Diaries (2003–05)
- Merge (2003–05)
- What Should You Do? (2003–06)
- How Clean Is Your House? (2004–05)
- Queen for a Day (2004)
- I Married a Princess (2005)
- You're Not the Man I Married (2005)
- Cheerleader Nation (2006)
- Inspector Mom (2006–07)
- Not Like Everyone Else (2006)
- Gay, Straight or Taken? (2007)
- Lisa Williams: Among the Dead (2007–08)
- Blush: The Search for the Next Great Makeup Artist (2008)
- The Big Match (2008)
- How to Look Good Naked (2008)
- Your Mama Don't Dance (2008)
- Cook Yourself Thin (2009)
- DietTribe (2009)
- Mission: Makeover (2009–10)
- Models of the Runway (2009–10)
- Project Runway (2009–17)
- Project Runway: All Star Challenge (2009)
- The Fairy Jobmother (2010)
- On the Road with Austin & Santino (2010)
- One Born Every Minute (2010)
- America's Most Wanted (2011–12)
- America's Supernanny (2011–12)
- Coming Home (2011–12)
- Dance Moms (2011–17, 2019)
- Glamour Belles (2011)
- Project Accessory (2011)
- Roseanne's Nuts (2011)
- Russian Dolls (2011)
- Seriously Funny Kids (2011)
- 7 Days of Sex (2012)
- 24 Hour Catwalk (2012)
- Abby's Ultimate Dance Competition (2012–2013)
- Dance Moms: Miami (2012)
- The Houstons: On Our Own (2012–13)
- My Life Is a Lifetime Movie (2012)
- Project Runway All Stars (2012–19)
- Prom Queens (2012)
- Teen Trouble (2012–13)
- Chasing Nashville (2013)
- Come Dine with Me (2013)
- Double Divas (2013)
- Preachers' Daughters (2013–15)
- Pretty Wicked Moms (2013)
- Supermarket Superstar (2013)
- Abby's Studio Rescue (2014)
- Access Health (2014–22)
- Betty White's Off Their Rockers (2014)
- Bring It! (2014–2019)
- Girlfriend Intervention (2014)
- Kim of Queens (2014)
- Little Women: LA (2014–19)
- Project Runway: Threads (2014)
- Raising Asia (2014)
- Relative Insanity (2014)
- True Tori (2014)
- Under the Gunn (2014)
- Big Women: Big Love (2015)
- BlackLove (2015)
- Fashionably Late with Rachel Zoe (2015)
- The Jacksons: Next Generation (2015)
- Jump (2015)
- Kosher Soul (2015)
- Life Flight: Trauma Center Houston (2015)
- Little Women: NY (2015)
- Living with the Enemy (2015)
- Seven Year Switch (2015–18)
- Atlanta Plastic (2016)
- Little Women: Atlanta (2016–21)
- The Mother/Daughter Experiment: Celebrity Edition (2016)
- Little Women: Dallas (2016)
- Pitch Slapped (2016)
- Project Runway: Junior (2016–17)
- The Rap Game (2016–19)
- American Beauty Star (2017)
- Married at First Sight (2017-25)
- Growing Up Supermodel (2017)
- The Pop Game (2017)
- So Sharp (2017)
- Live PD Presents: Women on Patrol (2018)
- Love at First Flight (2018)
- Making a Model (2018)
- My Partner Knows Best (2018)
- Cheerleader Generation (2019)
- Escaping Polygamy (2019)
- Marrying Millions (2019–21)
- Ms. T's Music Factory (2019)
- Surviving R. Kelly (2019–2020)
- Married at First Night: Couples' Cam (2020–21)
- Surviving Jeffrey Epstein (2020)
- Supernanny (2020)
- Hopelessly in Love (2020)
- Married at First Sight: Unmatchables (2021)
- 5 Guys a Week (2022)
- #TextMeWhenYouGetHome (2022–23)
- 24 Hour Flip (2023)
- Property Virgins (2023)
- Zombie House Flipping (2023)
- Theresa Caputo: Raising Spirits (2024)

==== Scripted ====
- The Days and Nights of Molly Dodd (1989–1992)
- Veronica Clare (1991–1992)
- Old MacDonald's Sing-A-Long Farm (1994–95)
- Any Day Now (1998–2002)
- Maggie (1998)
- Oh Baby (1998–2000)
- Strong Medicine (2000–2006)
- The Division (2001–2004)
- For the People (2002–2003)
- 1-800-Missing (2003–06)
- Wild Card (2003–05)
- Beach Girls (2005)
- Angela's Eyes (2006)
- Lovespring International (2006)
- Monarch Cove (2006)
- Army Wives (2007–2013)
- Side Order of Life (2007)
- Blood Ties (2007)
- State of Mind (2007)
- Rita Rocks (2008–2009)
- Drop Dead Diva (2009–2014)
- Sherri (2009)
- Against the Wall (2011)
- The Protector (2011)
- The Client List (2012–2013)
- Devious Maids (2013–2016)
- Witches of East End (2013–2014)
- The Lottery (2014)
- The Lizzie Borden Chronicles (2015)
- UnREAL (2015–18, moved to Hulu for the final season)
- Mary Kills People (2017–18)
- You (2018, moved to Netflix after season 1)
- American Princess (2019)

==== Miniseries ====
- The Prison Confessions of Gypsy Rose Blanchard (2024)

=== Former syndicated programming ===
- The Lazarus Syndrome (1985–87)
- Nurse (1985–86, 1988–89)
- Berrenger's (1986–87)
- Call to Glory (1986)
- Cassie & Co. (1986)
- Cover Up (1986–89)
- Family (1986–87)
- From Here to Eternity (1986)
- Hometown (1986)
- King's Crossing (1986)
- Partners in Crime (1986–1987)
- Two Marriages (1986–87)
- Apple's Way (1987)
- Falcon Crest (1987–88)
- Flamingo Road (1987)
- Jack and Mike (1987–1988)
- Kay O'Brien (1987)
- Lady Blue (1987–88)
- Lime Street (1987)
- Marcus Welby, M.D. (1987–1989)
- Wok with Yan (1987–1989)
- Cagney & Lacey (1988–1990, 1995–1996)
- Easy Street (1988–89)
- E/R (1988–1992)
- Foley Square (1988)
- Leg Work (1988–89)
- MacGruder and Loud (1988–90)
- Day by Day (1989–1991)
- The Frugal Gourmet (1989–1997)
- HeartBeat (1989–90)
- Spenser: For Hire (1989–91, 1995–96)
- E.N.G. (1990–1992)
- Hotel (1990–92)
- L.A. Law (1990–1997)
- Moonlighting (1990–91, 1993–94)
- She's the Sheriff (1990)
- Sister Kate (1990–92)
- The Tracey Ullman Show (1990–92, 1993–95)
- China Beach (1991–1993)
- Duet (1991–92)
- It's Garry Shandling's Show (1991–92)
- Thirtysomething (1992–98)
- Unsolved Mysteries (1992–2006; 2010–19)
- Anything but Love (1993)
- The Commish (1994–97, 1999–2000)
- Designing Women (1994–2006)
- Mary Hartman, Mary Hartman (1994)
- Midnight Caller (1994–95)
- Sisters (1994–98)
- Martha Stewart Living (1995–97)
- Nurses (1995–97)
- Hope & Gloria (1996, 1998)
- Scarecrow and Mrs. King (1996)
- Traders (1996)
- Almost Perfect (1997–1998)
- The Golden Girls (1997–2009)
- Homicide: Life on the Street (1997–1999)
- Night Court (1997–98)
- One West Waikiki (1997–1998)
- Chicago Hope (1998–2000)
- Ellen (1998–2000)
- Party of Five (1998–2000)
- Murphy Brown (2000–01)
- Mad About You (2002–05)
- The Nanny (2002–2008)
- Caroline in the City (2003–04)
- Laverne & Shirley (2004)
- Providence (2004–2008)
- The Golden Palace (2005)
- Suddenly Susan (2005)
- Will & Grace (2005–2013)
- Desperate Housewives (2006–12)
- Frasier (2006–2016)
- Medium (2006–12)
- Reba (2006–12)
- Still Standing (2006–2009)
- Wife Swap (2008–20)
- Cybill (2009)
- How I Met Your Mother (2009–18)
- Less than Perfect (2009)
- Airline (2010)
- American Pickers (2010–11)
- The New Adventures of Old Christine (2010–14)
- Charmed (2013–2014)
- Hoarders (2014–15)
- Rules of Engagement (2017)
- Live PD: Police Patrol (2018–19)
- The King of Queens (2019–20)
- The Mentalist (2022)
- The First 48 (2022)
- Grey's Anatomy (2007-2026)
- The Closer (2018-2026)
- Major Crimes (2021, 2023-2026)
- The Equalizer (2025-2026)
