= Living with the Enemy =

Living with the Enemy may refer to:

- Living with the Enemy (Australian TV series), 2014
- Living with the Enemy (radio programme), 2006
- Living with the Enemy (U.S. TV series), 2015
