= Osmin =

Osmin may refer to:

- Osmín, a given name
- Osmin, a fictional character in the 1672 play Bajazet by Jean Racine
- Osmin, a fictional character in the 1676 play Abdelazer by Aphra Behn
- Osmin, a fictional character in the 1780 opera Zaide and the 1782 opera Die Entführung aus dem Serail by Wolfgang Amadeus Mozart
- Operation Osmin, a television series
