= Kids These Days =

Kids These Days may refer to:

- Kids these days, stereotype about young people
- Kids These Days (TV series), an American TV series (1996–1998)
- Kids These Days (band), a band based in Chicago (2009–2013)
- Kids These Days, a 2014 album by Judah & the Lion
- Kids These Days, the first episode of American TV series Star Trek: Starfleet Academy (2026)
