= Osmín =

Osmín is a given name. Notable people with the given name include:

- Osmín Aguirre y Salinas (1889–1977), Salvadoran military officer and politician
- Osmín Hernández (born 1972), Cuban footballer

== See also ==
- Osmin, fictional characters
