= Coast Guard Alaska =

American documentary-style reality television series

- Coast Guard Alaska title card
- Genre: Reality television
- Country of origin: United States
- Original language: English
- No. of seasons: 4
- No. of episodes: 41

Production
- Executive producers: Al Roker; C. Russell Muth
- Camera setup: Multiple
- Running time: 60 minutes (including ads)
- Production company: Al Roker Entertainment

Original release
- Network: The Weather Channel
- Release: November 9, 2011 – April 13, 2015

Related
- Coast Guard Florida; Coast Guard Cape Disappointment: Pacific Northwest

Coast Guard Alaska is an American reality documentary television series on The Weather Channel that premiered on November 9, 2011. The series follows members of the United States Coast Guard stationed in Kodiak, Alaska, on the job.

After a seven episode first season, the series was renewed for a split second season, of five and eight episodes premiering in April and October 2012 respectively. The first season saw ratings increase for The Weather Channel of 95% on the same timeslot the year prior. A third season premiered on July 17, 2013, again made up of a split season of seven then six episodes. A fourth and final eight episode season premiered on February 23, 2015.

A 13 episode spin-off titled Coast Guard Florida premiered in October 2012. This was followed on December 5, 2012 with an hour-long special, Coast Guard: HMS Bounty Rescue, detailing the Coast Guard's attempt to rescue the replica of HMS Bounty and its crew during Hurricane Sandy. Another 13 episode spin-off series, Coast Guard Cape Disappointment/Pacific Northwest, premiered in February 2014.

== Episodes ==
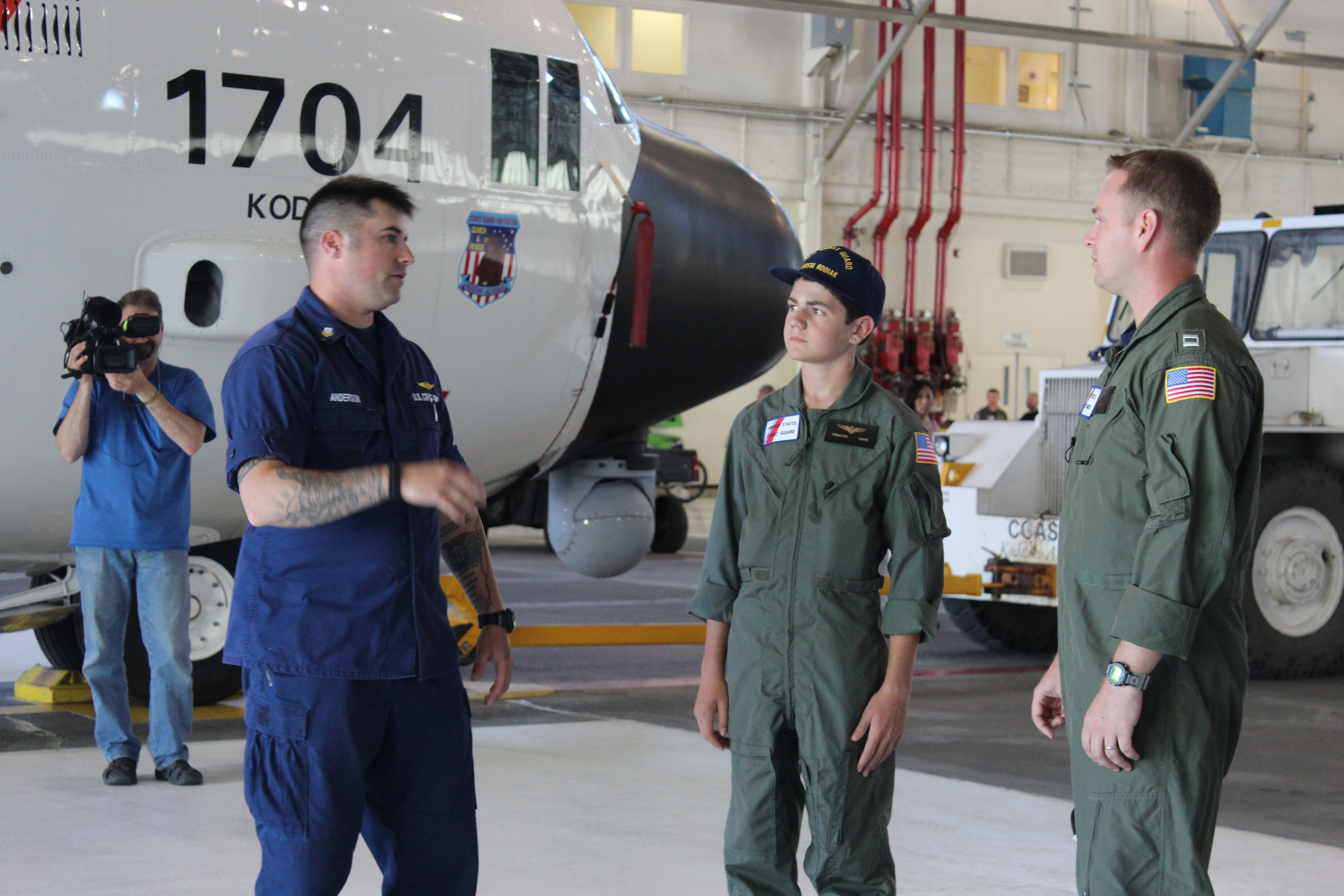
A cameraman records a scene in the Season 3 episode "Touching Lives" on July 24, 2013.

Season	Episodes	Originally released	
Season	Episodes	First released	Last released
1	7	November 9, 2011	January 18, 2012
2	13	April 18, 2012	January 16, 2013
3	13	July 17, 2013	December 30, 2013
4	8	February 23, 2015	April 13, 2015

=== Season 1 (2011—2012) ===
No. overall	No. in season	Title	Original release date
1	1	"Welcome to Kodiak"	November 9, 2011
The series opener examines life for Coast Guard men and women at Air Station Kodiak, where they police the area, perform rescues, protect the environment and oversee safety of marine transportation.
2	2	"To The Rescue"	November 16, 2011
Helicopter rescue crews encounter rough weather that threatens operations.
3	3	"Search and Rescue"	November 23, 2011
A helicopter rescue onboard a tanker in rough Alaskan seas; a race to reach a victim who fell off a 200-foot cliff; a rescue endeavor after a bush-plane crash a few miles from base.
4	4	"North Pole Bound"	November 30, 2011
The captain races to the North Pole; two helicopter rescue crews go on a mission to save injured fishermen; an aerial search is launched for a missing person in the North Pacific.
5	5	"Into the Wild"	December 7, 2011
At Station Ketchikan, a local man requires help from the boat crew; at Sitka, a helicopter-rescue team battles powerful winds to get to a vessel in trouble; back in Kodiak, there's an unknown distress call in the middle of the night. Meanwhile, a young AST struggles to make the grade.
6	6	"Land Ho"	January 18, 2012
The team races to Sitka, where a hunter's been shot in the back; two men in Kodiak abandon a sinking boat; guardsmen load a sleigh with holiday cheer and visit remote Alaskan villages.
7	7	"Surf's Up"	January 11, 2012
Rough seas are battled to reach a small boat; a surfer who sought shelter from the waves must be hoisted off a 200-foot cliff.

=== Season 2 (2012—2013) ===
No. overall	No. in season	Title	Original release date
8	1	"Into The Night"	April 18, 2012
The second season of Coast Guard Alaska kicks off with an epic story. On the night of January 24, 2012, Air Station Kodiak is hit by a pair of daunting rescue missions. When two distressed fishing vessels call for help, the Guardsmen muster all of their resources on the ground and in the air as they battle hurricane-force winds and bitter, subzero temperatures to rescue 11 passengers whose lives are on the line.
9	2	"Remote Rescue"	April 25, 2012
where the Guardsmen are often the first and only option for safe passage. Among those they must rescue are a man who suffers a heart attack, a woman who goes into labor, and an injured hunter who makes a desperate call for help after spending a bone-chilling night in the Alaskan wilderness.
10	3	"Survival Of The Fittest"	May 2, 2012
The Guardsmen race to the scene when a damaged vessel goes drifting across the tumultuous Bering Sea, an injured man needs to be hoisted off a freighter, and three hunters go stranded in the woods near Sitka. Back in Kodiak, rescue swimmers are embedded in the forest for a "survival school" that teaches them the most important lesson of all--how to stay alive in the treacherous Alaskan landscape.
11	4	"Come Heck or High Water"	May 9, 2012
Coast Guard Alaska takes to the skies and the seas on dramatic missions where not everything goes according to plan--and where the rescuers become the rescued. The helicopter crew is faced with a tough decision when one of their own calls for help, and on the Coast Guard cutter Alex Haley, a small boat team faces a serious situation when they attempt to board a fishing vessel in the turbulent waters of the Bering Sea.
12	5	"Family Matters"	May 16, 2012
In Alaska, while the seasons change, the dangers remain the same. The Coast Guard launches to a remote Alaskan village when an infant's life hangs in the balance. An injured woman aboard a fishing vessel must be airlifted to safety. And when a Coast Guard crewman is hurt in the line of duty, Air Station Kodiak takes the call to save one of their own.
13	6	"Lost and Found"	June 27, 2012
Coast Guard rescuers at Air Station Sitka race to save a fisherman struggling with deadly seizures, and to the scene of an accident when a man is pinned under a truck. And when a teenager goes missing in the woods, it's up to the Coast Guard to bring her home before time runs out.
14	7	"Precious Cargo"	July 11, 2012
Rescue missions in Cordova, Sitka and Kodiak tell the compelling stories of a fisherman whose life hangs in the balance, four hunters whose skiff goes lost at sea, and a crucial medevac for a woman facing agonizing pain.
15	8	"The Same Sheet of Music"	November 28, 2012
Air station Kodiak launches on varied rescue missions including medevacs for a heart attack victim and a violently injured fisherman. And when a damaged ship begins taking on water in the Bering Sea, the Coast Guard comes to their aid.
16	9	"True Guardian"	December 5, 2012
The Coast Guard faces off against gale force winds, relentless waves and dizzying heights to rescue the crew of a battered fishing vessel, an injured hiker, and a pair of ailing patients in Kodiak and Sitka.
17	10	"A Shocking Rescue"	December 12, 2012
Four action-packed rescue missions see the Coast Guard race to a medevac in the remote Bering Sea, bail out a vessel taking on water and save a pair of fisherman who suffer grave accidents.
18	11	"Changing of the Guard"	December 19, 2012
Air Station Sitka rushes to the aid of both an unconscious woman on a cruise ship and a small child suffering from seizures. And when a vessel is in danger of going under, the guardsmen answer their call for help.
19	12	"Into the Mist"	January 9, 2013
In Sitka, the Coast Guard drops to a commercial cruise ship to medevac a critically ill patient. And the crew is pushed to their limits as they face two critical rescue missions in the course of a single work day.
20	13	"A Good Day For A Bad Day"	January 16, 2013
In Sitka, an epic mission sets off when multiple air crews scour the seas for two missing fishermen. A newly-appointed Rescue Swimmer takes on his first case. And at air-station Kodiak, rescuers must fly through blinding fog to rescue an ailing man off of a container ship.

=== Season 3 (2013) ===
No. overall	No. in season	Title	Original release date
21	1	"An Eye-Opening Experience"	July 17, 2013
As the commander of Air Station Kodiak retires, the Coast Guard ramps up on dramatic SAR cases including a flight to pick up a fisherman gone overboard and a medevac for a badly injured veteran. And when a colossal oil rig goes rogue with eighteen souls trapped aboard, the Guardsmen take on a daring rescue mission.
22	2	"We Have the Watch"	July 24, 2013
The men and women of Air Station Sitka take on three perilous missions including an intense medevac for a heart attack victim on the brink of death, a risky hoist down to a fishing vessel taking on water, and a nighttime search along the frigid coastline for a fisherman lost ashore.
23	3	"A Pretty Severe Condition"	July 21, 2013
Wild turbulence, freezing temperatures and extreme heights are some of the obstacles facing the Coast Guard in Kodiak as they come to the rescue of a patient in a remote town, a boater stranded on a freezing beach and a hunter trapped in the mountains.
24	4	"Open Water"	August 14, 2013
Air Station Sitka responds to a call to medevac a man suffering from internal bleeding. Meanwhile, the Coast Guard in Kodiak gear up to rescue kayakers stranded in the ice, a man with several broken ribs, and the severely beleaguered crew of an overdue fishing vessel.
25	5	"All You Can Do"	August 21, 2013
When a sailboat loses its engines in rough seas, the Coast Guard in Sitka and Kodiak respond to the call. And the crew takes on a pair of medevacs--one for a sick child in a remote Alaskan village and the other for a man in grave condition aboard a charter vessel.
26	6	"Out on a Limb"	August 28, 2013
Amidst low visibility, the guardsmen in Sitka rush to medevac an elderly male in critical condition. Air Station Kodiak battles challenging weather and rough terrain to rescue a missing hiker stranded on a dangerous cliff, a crew from a tugboat that's aground and an elderly male injured in the mountains.
27	7	"Back to Back"	September 4, 2013
Air Station Sitka launches to save a man who suffers a bad spill while riding an ATV. The team takes on back-to-back cases for a man who falls on a charter vessel and a woman with a serious back injury. The Coast Guard diverts to the scene of a sightseeing vessel taking on water with 84 people on board.
28	8	"A Very Sitka Sendoff"	November 6, 2013
Air Station Sitka is launched on three time-sensitive missions for a fisherman with severed fingers, an injured hiker, and a cruise ship passenger experiencing stroke-like symptoms.
29	9	"With Purpose"	November 20, 2013
Air Station Kodiak moves rapidly to rescue a boat crew who has abandoned ship, a man suffering severe injuries after an ATV accident and a boat crewman suffering from internal bleeding. In Sitka, the crew launches to medevac a woman off of a cruise ship.
30	10	"In the Thick of It"	November 20, 2013
Air Station Kodiak launches to medevac a man suffering from heart attack symptoms. Sitka aircrews are on high alert as they search for a downed aircraft with 7 people on board, and for two boat crewmen who have gone overboard.
31	11	"Pucker Factor"	November 27, 2013
Air Station Sitka pushes through low visibility to rescue a man crushed in a motor vehicle accident, while Air Station Kodiak launches on a long-range mission to medevac a male suffering a brain injury. In Cordova, aircrews launch to medevac a boat crewman suffering a stroke and provide assistance to a vessel taking on water.
32	12	"Touching Lives"	December 4, 2013
Air Station Kodiak opens their arms to a young man battling a life-threatening illness. Meanwhile, the crews launch to medevac three boat crewmen affected by a deadly chemical leak and a male crushed by a tractor. A Sitka aircrew is diverted to medevac a male suffering a heart attack.
33	13	"Alaska's Dangerous Lure"	December 30, 2013
Lured by Alaska's beauty, four individuals find themselves in need of Coast Guard assistance - a woman fulfilling her dreams of fishing in Alaska suffers intense abdominal pain, hikers are stranded overnight in the frigid cold and a man suffers severe injuries after a biking accident.

=== Season 4 (2015) ===
No. overall	No. in season	Title	Original release date	U.S. viewers (thousands)
34	1	"The Wind Was Raging"	February 23, 2015	N/A
A hunter, stranded for 7 days in Alaska's inhospitable weather is rescued by Air Station Sitka, while in Kodiak, an aircrew battles rough weather to rescue four fishermen forced to abandon ship.
35	2	"In A Land Far Away"	March 2, 2015	N/A
Air Station Kodiak faces harsh weather en route to a man with a severed finger, and launches on a long-range SAR for a man injured from a 75-foot fall. In Sitka, aircrews medevac an elderly heart attack patient and a man severely burned in a house fire.
36	3	"Sitka Responds"	March 9, 2015	243,000
Air Station Sitka departs in deteriorating weather to medevac an infant in dire condition, search for a male aboard an overdue skiff and assist a vessel being pounded by waves.
37	4	"To Final Flights"	March 16, 2015	177,000
Air Station Sitka crews must find the quickest route to rescue a logger with severe head trauma and bleeding, and a man whose health is quickly deteriorating. In Kodiak, a motor vessel is hit by a rogue wave that causes multiple injuries.
38	5	"Saving The Fallen"	March 23, 2015	168,000
There's a heightened sense of urgency as the Coast Guard launches for a fisherman at risk of losing his arm, a young man that suffered a dangerous fall and a man that experienced a life-threatening heart attack.
39	6	"Hook, Line and Sinker"	March 30, 2015	171,000
Coast Guard crews brave hazardous weather and low visibility to effect multiple rescues - a fisherman with a fishhook lodged in his eye, a woman experiencing a heart attack and a boat in distress following a heated dispute.
40	7	"All Their Efforts"	April 6, 2015	132,000
Time is critical for an overturned skiff with two people in the water, a man experiencing kidney failure and two stranded individuals. The Coast Guard must respond amidst rapidly deteriorating conditions.
41	8	"Thank You Coast Guard Alaska"	April 13, 2015	191,000
Aircrews launch into unforgiving conditions to rescue a young woman gone missing, an elderly woman with heart pain and two severely injured males. When no one else will fly, the Coast Guard will launch to the rescue. Thank you, Coast Guard Alaska.

== Streaming releases ==
The series is streaming on Amazon Prime Video.
