= Jeff Gralnick =

- Born: Jeffery Charles Gralnick; April 3, 1939; Brooklyn, New York, U.S.
- Died: May 9, 2011 (aged 72); Weston, Connecticut, U.S.
- Occupations: Broadcast journalist, professor
- Spouses: Carol Beckmann (m. 1963; div. 1969); Elizabeth Baumgart (m. 1969)
- Children: 3

Jeffery Charles "Jeff" Gralnick (April 3, 1939 – May 9, 2011) was an American broadcast journalist and professor new media at Columbia University and Fairfield University.

== Early life and education ==
Gralnick was born April 3, 1939 in Brooklyn, New York, the oldest son of Abe Gralnick and Mildred Gralnick (née Feinstein), into a Jewish family. He graduated from New York University in 1961.

== Professional career ==
Gralnick served as a news consultant for NBC until his death. His experience includes: reporting on the field in Vietnam for CBS News. He served as a vice president and Executive Producer for ABC's World News Tonight, as an Executive Producer of NBC's Nightly News with Tom Brokaw, and as an Executive overlooking the creation of ABCNews.com. He covered the astronaut Alan Shepard's mission in 1961, produced the coverage for every U.S. space flight through Apollo 11, and also covered man's return to space in 1988 after the space shuttle Challenger's accident.

Assignment Desk editor at CBS News 1961 (CBS-TV, New York City) - at CBS, worked with/for Mike Wallace, Don Hewitt, Walter Cronkite, Hughes Rudd, Sandy Sokolow, Harry Reasoner, and in New Orleans after the JFK assassination with Nelson Benton, Lew Wood and correspondent Bill Stout.

== Personal life ==
In 1963, Gralnick married firstly to Carol Beckmann, with whom he had one child;

- Leslie Michel Gralnick (born 1965)

During this marriage which ended in divorce he resided in New Orleans, Lousiana. In 1969, he married secondly to Elizabeth "Beth" Baumgart (1942–2026), a daughter of Robert Baumgart and Stella Baumgart (née Lacher), of New York City. They had two children;

- Robert Howard "Bob" Gralnick, a teacher, firstly married Amy Elizabeth Peterson, secondly to Phebe Parkin.
- Kate Gralnick, married to Timothy Surber, one son.

Gralnick died May 9, 2011 at his home in Weston, Connecticut aged 72.
