= My Extreme Animal Phobia =

- Genre: Reality television
- Starring: Dr. Robin Zasio
- Country of origin: United States
- Original language: English
- No. of seasons: 1
- No. of episodes: 6 (1 unaired)

Production
- Executive producers: Tom Forman; Julie Jones; Jon Beyer; Brad Bishop; Lisa Lucas
- Running time: 60 minutes
- Production company: RelativelyREAL

Original release
- Network: Animal Planet
- Release: October 21 – November 18, 2011

My Extreme Animal Phobia is an Animal Planet television miniseries that premiered on October 21, 2011. Each episode of the series focuses upon three patients who are assisted by Dr. Robin Zasio in overcoming their various animal phobias through exposure therapy over the course of five days.

== Episodes ==
=== Season 1: 2011–2011 ===
Season 1 premiered on October 21, 2011 and ran during the Friday night 10 p.m. timeslot on Animal Planet.

No.	Title	Patients	Original release date
1	"They Hide in the AC"	Marvin (pitbulls), Seth (snakes), Jahara (spiders)	October 21, 2011
2	"Worse Than Halloween"	Tom (bats), Roxanna (rats), Laura (cockroaches)	November 4, 2011
3	"My Worst Fear"	Andrew (cockroaches), Jackie (butterflies), Katie (spiders)	November 4, 2011
4	"Swarms of Venom"	Shelly (sharks), Kurt (bees), Tameeka (millipedes)	November 11, 2011
5	"It's Trying to Get Me"	Donyale (moths), Tino (lizards), Luann (birds)	November 18, 2011
6	"Petrified of Pets"	Sandra (cats), Shereese (dogs), Patrick (spiders)	Unaired

== Critical reception ==
My Extreme Animal Phobia received mixed reviews. Neil Genzlinger of The New York Times was quite critical of the show, calling it "fairly ridiculous" and "a disservice, really, to those afflicted with debilitating phobias."
