= Life Flight: Trauma Center Houston =

American reality medical show, 2015

- Genre: Reality
- Country of origin: United States
- Original language: English
- No. of seasons: 1
- No. of episodes: 6

Production
- Running time: 30 minutes

Original release
- Network: Lifetime
- Release: March 2 – March 16, 2015

Life Flight: Trauma Center Houston is an American reality series created and executive produced for Lifetime Television by the Boardwalk Entertainment Group, Timothy Scott Bogart, Gary A. Randall, and Brad Bogart. The series had one season consisting of six episodes, airing two back-to-back weekly for three weeks in March of 2015.

== Format ==
Life Flight follows Houston Texas' only hospital-based air ambulance service, which since 1976 has retrieved critically ill and injured patients within a 150-mile radius of the TMC with helicopters and worldwide using fixed-wing transport. Filming takes place on the helicopters and at the hospital associated with the team at the Memorial Hermann Texas Trauma Institute at Texas Medical Center - the only level 1 trauma center for adults and children in Houston. The show followed both first responders and doctors at the hospital.

CEO of Memorial Hermann-Texas Medical Center, Craig Cordola, said one purpose of the show is that "we hope people will have a better appreciation of how prevalent trauma is, and how preventable."

== Episodes ==
| No. in series | No. in season | Title | Original air date |
|---|---|---|---|
| 1 | 1 | "Life Flight" | March 2, 2015 |
| 2 | 2 | "It Takes a Village" | March 2, 2015 |
| 3 | 3 | "Cinco de Mayo" | March 9, 2015 |
| 4 | 4 | "Getting You Wings" | March 9, 2015 |
| 5 | 5 | "Keep Up or Burn Out" | March 16, 2015 |
| 6 | 6 | "Hog Versus Man" | March 16, 2016 |
