= Pretty Hurts (TV series) =

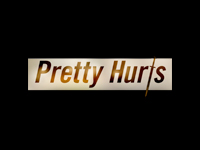
- Genre: Reality
- Country of origin: United States
- Original language: English
- No. of seasons: 1
- No. of episodes: 10

Production
- Executive producers: Julie Auerbach; Gary Auerbach; Tina Gazzerro; Douglas Segal; Christopher Willey; Dave Mace
- Production location: Los Angeles
- Production company: Go Go Luckey Productions

Original release
- Network: Logo
- Release: May 7 – July 19, 2011

Pretty Hurts is an American reality television series from the LGBT-interest network Logo. The show revolves around Rand Rusher, a Botox/Restylane injectionist to the starlets, Hollywood wives, and the wannabes of Beverly Hills. The setting is Rusher's office on S. Bedford Drive in Beverly Hills.

== Cast ==
- Rand Rusher: Rusher is a registered nurse with over 20 years experience in all specialties relating to surgical and dermatological medicine. Rand spent his early career years working as a surgical nurse at the University of Southern California Norris Cancer Hospital and Research Center. While in practice at USC for seven years as a critical care nurse, he received national recognition and certification from the Association of Preoperative Nurse's Association for his outstanding knowledge and skills in operating room nursing and all related surgical specialties. In 2002 Rand joined Dr. Norman Leaf in creating Leaf & Rusher Skincare – an advanced skincare program focused on non-acid technology with active and botanical ingredients.
- Curt W. Meeuwsen: In 2004 Curt became the Chief Executive Officer of Leaf & Rusher Corporation, a beauty products company located in Beverly Hills. In his role he oversees all aspects of Operations, Brand Management, Marketing, Product Development, Sales and Finance.

== Episodes ==
No.	Title	Original release date
1	"Mr. Fix It"	May 7, 2011
2	"Birthdays Hurt"	May 14, 2011
3	"Love Hurts"	May 21, 2011
4	"Selling Hurts"	May 28, 2011
5	"Time Hurts"	June 4, 2011
6	"P.R. Hurts"	June 11, 2011
7	"Ex-Mother-In-Laws Hurts"	June 18, 2011
8	"Fasting Hurts"	June 25, 2011
9	"Feedback Hurts"	July 9, 2011
10	"Issues Hurt"	July 16, 2011
