= Twist of Fate (2011 TV series) =

- Genre: Weather; Documentary
- Country of origin: United States
- Original language: English
- No. of seasons: 2

Original release
- Network: The Weather Channel
- Release: June 1, 2011

Twist of Fate is an American documentary television series that airs on The Weather Channel. It premiered on June 1, 2011.

The series follows survivors of natural disasters who were in severe danger at one point. In each episode, it details the split-second choices and twists of fate that got them to and out of those situations.

== Production ==
The series was put together using interviews with the survivors intermingled with actor portrayals of what approximately happened. An exception to this rule was an episode in season 2 which included footage from one of the survivors' helmet camera.

== Reception ==
The New York Daily News's David Hinkley gave Twist of Fate a generally positive review, stating that the series had "drama that feels so tense you'd almost think it was scripted". However, he didn't like that "the narration in "Twist of Fate" is turned up to full volume almost all the time", because "the stories don't need that kind of rhetoric to be compelling."
