= Wedding Central =

American digital cable television channel

- Country: United States
- Headquarters: Jericho, New York, United States

Programming
- Language: American English

Ownership
- Owner: Rainbow Media Networks

History
- Launched: August 18, 2009; 16 years ago
- Closed: July 1, 2011; 14 years ago

Wedding Central was an American digital cable television channel that focused on programming involving brides and weddings, which was a spin-off of the programming which made up much of WE tv's schedule at the network's launch on August 18, 2009. The network was launched by the Rainbow Media subsidiary of Cablevision. Much of the network's programming was taken from previously aired WE tv wedding programming and wedding-related motion pictures, with little new content offered outside of promotions and on-screen quizzes. Also offered solely on Cablevision systems was interactive television components such as quizzes, polls, voting, and advertising opportunities for national and local wedding retailers.

Unlike WE tv, which was a successful spin-off of AMC itself in 1997, the network had only limited distribution, only being carried on the systems of Cablevision, a limited amount of Time Warner Cable and Mediacom systems. When Cablevision spun off Rainbow Media into a separate public company known as AMC Networks via an initial public offering on July 1, 2011, the new company closed Wedding Central on the same day. Wedding-related programming returned to have a focus on WE tv, and Wedding Central's website now redirects to WE tv's weddings section.

== Programming ==
Series formerly featured on Wedding Central included:

- Always a Bridesmaid
- Amazing Wedding Cakes
- Beach Weddings
- Bridezillas
- Girl Meets Cowboy
- How to Marry a Prince
- My Big Fat Fabulous Wedding
- Rich Bride Poor Bride
- Single in the City
- The Wedding Planners
- Wedding Cake Masters
