= Taking On Tyson =

Television show about pigeon racing, starring Mike Tyson

- Starring: Mike Tyson; Mario Costa; Vinnie Torre; Junie Roman; Rickie Roman
- Country of origin: United States
- No. of seasons: 1
- No. of episodes: 6

Production
- Running time: 43 minutes

Original release
- Network: Animal Planet
- Release: March 6 – April 4, 2011

Taking On Tyson is a television show on Animal Planet. The show stars the American boxer Mike Tyson competing in pigeon racing. Animal rights critiques criticized the series as being "animal cruelty."
