= Seriously Funny Kids =

- Genre: Reality; Comedy
- Directed by: Hal Grant; Jeffrey A. Fisher
- Starring: Heidi Klum
- Narrated by: Mocean Melvin
- Country of origin: United States
- Original language: English
- No. of seasons: 1
- No. of episodes: 20

Production
- Running time: 30 minutes
- Production companies: Full Picture Entertainment; LMNO Productions

Original release
- Network: Lifetime
- Release: February 1 – April 11, 2011

Seriously Funny Kids is an American comedy television show hosted by Heidi Klum that aired from February 1 until April 11, 2011.

== Premise ==
Heidi Klum interviews kids and brings out unpredictable remarks.

== Production ==
On October 12, 2010, Lifetime ordered 20 episodes of Seriously Funny Kids.

== Episodes ==
No.	Title	Original release date
1	"Does He Do tricks?"	February 1, 2011
2	"Booyah!"	February 1, 2011
3	"Laker Idol"	February 8, 2011
4	"Klumosaurus Rex"	February 8, 2011
5	"Lying, Cheating and Hypnotizing"	February 15, 2011
6	"What is a Heidi Klum?"	February 15, 2011
7	"Heidi Gets Made-up and Over"	February 22, 2011
8	"Two Brothers and a SuperModel"	February 22, 2011
9	"Break It to Me Gently"	February 28, 2011
10	"Heidi Talks Money walks"	February 28, 2011
11	"Mind-Reading Goat"	March 7, 2011
12	"X Marks the Spot"	March 7, 2011
13	"Tony Hawk on TV"	March 14, 2011
14	"I Dream of Heidi"	March 14, 2011
15	"Heidi Gone Bananas"	March 21, 2011
16	"The Difference Between boys and Girls"	March 28, 2011
17	"Don't Hold Your Breath!"	March 28, 2011
18	"The Tortoise and the Heidi"	April 4, 2011
19	"What is a Zombie?"	April 4, 2011
20	"Driving Miss Heidi"	April 11, 2011

== Reception ==
The show's first episode was watched by 1.1 million viewers. When the February 15 episode was watched by only 409,000 viewers, the show was moved from 9:30 PM to 11:00 PM. On February 25, Lifetime announced that they were moving the show to Mondays at 6:00 PM.

== See also ==
- Kids Say the Darndest Things
