= Kids These Days (TV series) =

- Presented by: Dana Fleming
- Country of origin: United States
- Original language: English

Production
- Running time: 30 minutes

Original release
- Network: Lifetime
- Release: 1996 – 1998

Kids These Days is an American discussion series that aired on Lifetime Cable in the morning Monday through Friday from 1996 to 1998. It is a half-hour show, hosted by Dana Fleming. It took over for the canceled series Your Baby and Child.

The series discussed issues on parenting, children and teenagers. Initially the focus was on children in the age range 6 to 12. The subjects included safety at home and at school, childhood fears, kids and divorce, single parents, child care, dealing with death, and parent-teacher relations. The debut episode had an interview with child psychologist David Elkind, and featured a child who received benefit from medication for ADHD.

The series was part of a two-hour programming block that Lifetime hoped would appeal to women aged 18 through 34. In a generally positive review, critic Suzanne Gill wrote that the show is more likely than other such shows to allow for family viewing with the children included, because each episode has a child describing the challenges in their own words.
