= Living with the Enemy (American TV series) =

- Genre: Reality television
- Country of origin: United States
- Original language: English
- No. of seasons: 1
- No. of episodes: 6

Production
- Executive producers: Travis Shakespeare; Patrick Costello; Alex Weresow; Jane Tranter; Eli Lehrer; Mary Donahue; Paul Hardy
- Producer: BBC Worldwide
- Running time: 42 minutes

Original release
- Network: Lifetime
- Release: July 9 – August 21, 2015

Living with the Enemy is an American reality television series that premiered on July 9, 2015 on Lifetime. The series chronicles two advocates with opposing views on a particular subject over an eight-day period; the first four days are spent at the home of the person who is in favor of the subject, while the last four days are spent at the home of the person who is against the subject.

== Episodes ==
No.	Title	Original release date
1	"Don't Fat Shame Me"	July 9, 2015
Topic: Fat acceptance
2	"Mommy Wars"	July 16, 2015
Topic: Lenient vs. strict parenting styles
3	"Put a Ring on It"	July 23, 2015
Topic: Same-sex marriage
4	"One Man, Four Wives"	July 30, 2015
Topic: Polygamy vs. monogamy
5	"What's the Beef?"	August 6, 2015
Topic: Hunting vs. veganism
6	"Naked or Afraid"	August 13, 2015
Topic: Pornography
