= Glamour Belles =

- Genre: Reality
- Country of origin: United States
- Original language: English
- No. of seasons: 1
- No. of episodes: 6

Production
- Executive producers: Brian Flanagan; Gena McCarthy; Laura Palumbo Johnson; JoAnn Alfano; David Hillman; Matthew Ostrom
- Running time: 30 mins.
- Production company: Magilla Entertainment

Original release
- Network: Lifetime
- Release: April 6 – April 20, 2011

Glamour Belles is an American reality television series that aired from April 6 until April 20, 2011.

== Premise ==
Paige Burcham Carlton runs a pageant-dress shop in Union City, Tennessee.

== Cast ==
- Paige Burcham Carlton
- JoAnn Burcham
- Jared Hamlin
- Nikki Williams
- Brooke Beachum
- Stephanie Sergerson

== Episodes ==
No.	Title	Original release date
1	"Where Queens Shop and Jaws Drop"	April 6, 2011
A former pageant contestant looks for the perfect dress for her wedding reception. A young customer wants to replace a ruined pageant dress. A customer wants to win a pageant for her sick father.
2	"JoAnn Strikes Back"	April 6, 2011
A former beauty queen wants to make a comeback. An athlete wants to advance in the world of pageants. A young customer has a fit.
3	"Doggone Glamour"	April 13, 2011
A teenager searches for a conservative homecoming dress. Paige helps Jared with a sale. Paige has a surprise for an underprivileged customer. Jared and JoAnn signs their dogs up for a costume contest.
4	"Big Glitz in a Small Town"	April 13, 2011
A girl looks for a dress to use in the talent portion of a pageant. A former Miss Tennessee looks for a new gown. Paige is concerned about Stephanie's sewing project.
5	"Where Good Dresses Go To Die"	April 20, 2011
Paige helps a friend with a beach-wedding dress. A woman needs a torn dress fixed before the next pageant. A mom and daughter argue over a pageant-dress purchase. The staff helps clean out a closet full of old dresses.
6	"How Much is that Dress in the Window"	April 20, 2011
A customer brings her family to look at a dress. A rival of Paige visits the shop. Two sisters look for new pageant dresses. Paige wants Jared to redress the store window.
