= Operation Osmin =

- Starring: Osmin Hernandez
- Country of origin: United States
- No. of seasons: 2
- No. of episodes: 23

Production
- Running time: 60 minutes

Original release
- Network: nuvoTV (2011-present)
- Release: July 4, 2011 – present

Operation Osmin is a television series produced by American cable network nuvoTV. The fitness reality show debuted on July 4, 2011 as part of the relaunch of nuvoTV from the former Sí TV. Each episode focuses on out-of-shape challengers who participate in grueling, unconventional training from fitness trainer Osmin Hernandez, who was part of an elite Cuban military unit.

On Operation Osmin, the trainer has 30 days to get his challengers into the best shape of their lives by using his signature “the world is your gym” technique. This involves training in unusual places, like busy streets or parking lots, sometimes combined with extreme weather conditions like storms. Participants are also required to maintain a diet of fish, salad and water.

The first season of Operation Osmin aired from July to August 2011 and consisted of ten episodes. Season one registered as the highest rated original series ever produced for the network.

Season 2 premiered on nuvoTV on January 13, 2012 consisting of 13 episodes.

Operation Osmin was created by Eric Evangelista and Osmin Hernandez. The program is produced by Evangelista's New York-based production company Hot Snakes Media for nuvoTV.

== Seasons ==
=== Season 1 ===
- Premiered: July 4, 2011

Episode 1: "Joe"

Episode 2: "Biankha"

Episode 3: "Willy"

Episode 4: "Khalia"

Episode 5: "Adriana"

Episode 6: "Drew"

Episode 7: "Domina"

Episode 8: "Louisa"

Episode 9: "Christian"

Episode 10: "Adam"

=== Season 2 ===
- Premiered: January 13, 2012

Episode 1: "Lawyer In Lust"

Episode 2: "Osmin Obsession"

Episode 3: "Fire-Hot Fitness"

Episode 4: "Hot for Hollywood"

Episode 5: "Centerfold Slimdown"

Episode 6: "Family Betrayals"

Episode 7: "Pole Dancer Diet"

Episode 8: "Flabby Night Lights"

Episode 9: "Baby Mama Drama"

Episode 10: "Cheater Blues"

Episode 11: "Bikini Body Dreams"

Episode 12: "Cuffed & Stuffed"

Episode 13: "Plus Sized Sexy"
