= Coming Home (American TV series) =

American reality television series

- Presented by: Matt Rogers
- Country of origin: United States
- No. of seasons: 2
- No. of episodes: 25

Production
- Executive producers: Tom Forman; Star Price
- Production company: RelativityReal

Original release
- Network: Lifetime
- Release: March 6, 2011 – July 18, 2012

Coming Home is an American reality television series on the Lifetime network that premiered on March 6, 2011. The series is paired with Lifetime's drama series Army Wives.

== Premise ==
The series focuses on the family reunions that occur as United States military personnel return home from active duty overseas, and the lengths that the returning member goes through to make the reunion a surprise.

== Episodes ==
=== Season 1 (2011) ===
No.	Title	Original release date
1	"A Knight's Tale"	March 6, 2011
2	"Daddy's Little Girl"	March 13, 2011
3	"The Hat Trick"	March 20, 2011
4	"Paying Tribute"	March 27, 2011
5	"A Proper Wedding"	April 3, 2011
6	"Finding Dad"	April 10, 2011
7	"Holy Surprise"	April 17, 2011
8	"A Wild Ride Home"	May 1, 2011
9	"Birthday Roundup"	May 8, 2011
10	"Short-Stack Surprise"	May 15, 2011
11	"A Little Bit of Country"	May 22, 2011
12	"Three Cheers for Dad"	May 29, 2011
13	"A Day at The Circus"	June 5, 2011

=== Season 2 (2012) ===
No.	Title	Original release date
1	"Raider Reunion"	March 11, 2012
2	"Daddy's Girls"	March 18, 2012
3	"Hula Homecoming"	March 25, 2012
4	"Strike Up the Band"	April 1, 2012
5	"We'll Be Here for You"	June 1, 2012
6	"Slam Dunk"	June 13, 2012
7	"Birthday Splash"	June 13, 2012
8	"Photo Finish"	June 20, 2012
9	"Out of Thin Air"	June 27, 2012
10	"Daddy's Little Dancer"	July 4, 2012
11	"In Honor of Dad"	July 11, 2012
12	"Love and Laughter"	July 18, 2012
