= Discovery Home & Health (Southeast Asian TV channel) =

Discovery Home & Health Southeast Asia
- Broadcast area: Hong Kong, Philippines, Indonesia, Singapore, Thailand and Malaysia

Ownership
- Owner: Discovery Networks Asia Pacific (Asia); Discovery Communications (Asia)

History
- Launched: 1 January 2006
- Closed: 31 July 2014
- Replaced by: Eve

Discovery Home & Health Southeast Asia was a television channel based in Asia. Discovery Home & Health Southeast Asia was available in Hong Kong, the Philippines, Indonesia, Singapore, Thailand, and Malaysia. The channel was launched on 1 January 2006.

On 1 August 2014, Discovery Home & Health was replaced by Eve, while Discovery Home & Health shows were moved to TLC on 7 July 2014, coinciding the change of Discovery Turbo to DMAX.

== Programming ==
- 18 Kids and Counting
- 19 Kids and Counting
- A Baby Story
- A Makeover Story
- Aerobic Conditioning
- Big Medicine
- Body Invaders
- Bringing Home Baby
- Bulging Brides
- Call 911
- Deliver Me
- Deliver Me: Home Edition
- Fixing Dinner
- Human Stories
- Here Comes Honey Boo Boo
- I Didn't Know I Was Pregnant
- Jon & Kate Plus 8
- Last Chance Salon
- Little People, Big World
- Long Island Medium
- Last Chance Salon
- Make Room For Multiples
- Perfect Housewife
- Runway Moms
- Say Yes To The Dress
- Secretly Pregnant
- Shalom in the Home
- Strictly Dr. Drew
- Surviving Sextuplets and Twins
- The Fat Family
- Til Debt Do Us Part
- Total Body Sculpt With Gilad
- Wedding Day Makeover
- When Sleep Goes Bad
- Yummy Mummy

== See also ==
- Discovery Home & Health (UK & Ireland)
- Discovery Home & Health
