= List of programmes broadcast by Discovery Home & Health =

The following are the list of programmes that are broadcast by Discovery Home & Health.

== A ==
- A&E
- The A-List Diet
- Adoption Stories
- Aerobic Conditioning
- All Star Workouts
- Amazing Births

== B ==
- Babes in the Wood
- Baby Days
- A Baby Story
- Baby Tales
- Baby's Room
- Berman & Berman
- Big Medicine
- BirthDay
- Body Spectacular
- Bringing Home Baby

== C ==
- Catwalk Mums
- Celebrity Slimming
- Charm School
- Chicago Medical
- Cleanaholics
- Come Dine with Me
- Cover Shot
- Crash Test Mommy
- Critical Condition
- The Critical Hour

== D ==
- A Dating Story
- Desperate Dieters
- Desperate Houses
- Dietbusters
- Downsize Me
- Dr. G: Medical Examiner
- Dr. Know
- The Dummies Guide - contains 4 "mini-programmes"; Dating, Marriage, Parenting and Pregnancy for Dummies
- Dwarf Stories

== E ==
- Emergency
- Emergency Medics

== F ==
- Face The Family
- Fat Academy
- Fat Doctor
- Fifty Stone Man...
- Fifty Stone Woman...
- Fixing Dinner
- From Here to Maternity

== H ==
- Help Me to Speak
- Home Birth Diaries
- House of Babies
- How Clean is Your House?
- How to Live Longer
- Human Stories
- Homes Under The Hammer

== I ==
- I'd Kill For A Baby

== K ==
- Kitchen Crimes

== L ==
- Lisa Williams: Life Among the Dead
- Little People, Big World
- Losing It: Tales From Fat Camp

== M ==
- Make Room for Baby
- Maternity Ward
- Medical Miracles
- Mini Models
- A Model Life...
- Multiple Mums
- Mum + One
- Mums The Word
- My Big Foot...
- My Greek Kitchen

== N ==
- Nanny School
- National Body Challenge

== P ==
- Perfect Housewife
- Perfect Proposal
- A Place in the Sun
- Plastic Surgeons
- Plastic Surgery: Before and After
- Portland Babies
- Prison Doctors
- Purely Cosmetic

== R ==
- The Real ER
- Rebuilt: The Human Body Shop
- Renovate My Wardrobe
- Rescue Mediums
- Resident Life
- Rich Bride Poor Bride
- Room 2B You

== S ==
- Save Us From Our House!
- Sex Change
- Sex Tips For Girls
- Sextuplets
- Shalom in the Home
- Silicone Chicks
- Slimming Club
- Smooth Movers
- Strictly Dr. Drew
- Student Midwives
- Style By Jury
- Super Humans
- Supernanny
- Surviving Sextuplets and Twins

== T ==
- Take Home Chef
- Test Tube Babies
- Texas Cheer Moms
- Things I Hate About You
- Til Debt Do Us Part
- Trauma Team
- Twins by Surrogacy
- Twins in Peril
- The Biggest Loser

== U ==
- Untold Stories of the E.R.

== W ==
- A Wedding Story
- What Men Want
- What Women Want
- When Surgical Tools...
- Who Rules the Roost
- Who'll Age Worst
- World's Fattest Kids...

== Y ==
- Yorkhill Hospital
- Yummy Mummy
