= List of programs previously broadcast by Southern Broadcasting Network =

Below the programs previously aired by Southern Broadcasting Network and ETC. Broadcasts a variety of programming through its UHF terrestrial television station SBN-TV 21 Manila. For the current shows on SolarFlix of this network, see List of programs broadcast by SolarFlix.

== Local defunct shows ==
=== Newscasts ===
- Ito Ang Balita (2002–2004)
- Philippine Headline News (1992–2007)
- PSE Live: The Stock Market Today (1995–1998)
- Solar Daybreak^{1} (2012–2013)
- Solar Headlines^{1} (2012–2013)
- Solar Network News^{1} (2012–2013)
- Solar News Cebuano^{1} (2013)
- Solar Newsday^{1} (2012–2013)
- Solar Nightly News^{1} (2012–2013)
- Solar Sports Desk^{1} (2012–2013)

=== Public affairs ===
- Biblia at Balita (2001)
- Elections 2013^{1} (2012–2013)
- Fora Medica
- Gabay at Aksyon (2003-2007)
- Inform in 100 (Election Special Reports)^{1} (2013)
- Legal at Espiritual (2001)
- Legal Help Desk^{1} (2012–2013)
- MedTalk^{1} (2012–2013)
- The New Bob Garon Debates (2001)
- News Café^{1} (2012–2013)
- News.PH^{1} (2012–2013)
- Opposing Views^{1} (2013)
- TownHall: The Solar News-PPCRV Election Series^{1} (2013)
- Usapang Legal with Willie (2006–2007)

=== Informative ===
- Amazing Lifestyle (2001–2003)
- Barangay Uniting for Chess (2006–2007)
- Buhay Pelota (2003–2007)
- Buhay Pinoy (2002–2007)
- Talk TV/Solar News Channel: Billboard^{1} (2011–2013)
- ETC Hotlist^{1} (2009–2011, 2013–2022)
- ETC Location^{1} (2016–2022)
- ETC Vibe^{1} (2008–2011, 2013–2016)
- Morning! Umaga Na! (2006–2007)
- Something to Chew On^{1} (2013)
- Talk TV/Solar News Channel: The Scoop^{1} (2011–2013)
- What I See^{1} (2012–2013)

=== Entertainment ===
- Celebrity Night of Dance and Music (2006–2007)
- Chill Spot^{1} (2008–2009)
- Cyber Jam (1996–1999)
- ETC HQ (December 3, 2013)
- ETCETERA^{1} (2013–2015)
- For Women Only
- Friday Night Live (2001)
- Gen M^{1} (2010–2011)
- Let the Music Live (2001)
- Rated Oh!^{1}
- SBN 21 Live (1996–2001)
- Stylized (2014)
- The Journey to the Crown^{1} (2016–2017)
- World TV Mag (1992–1996)
- XYZ Young Women's TV

=== Reality ===
- I Am Meg (2013–2015)
- Mega Fashion Crew (2013–2014)
- Project Runway Philippines^{1} (2008–2009, 2015)

=== Religious ===
- Ang Dating Daan (2000–2004)
- Ang Tamang Daan (2001–2003)
- Bible Quiz Bee (2001)
- Bible Stories : Comics on T.V. (2001-2004)
- Friends Again (2003–2007)
- Give Us This Day! with Pastor Apollo C. Quiboloy (2003–2006; now aired on SMNI)
- Jesus: Lord of the Nations (2004–2007)
- Kerygma TV (2003–2007)
- Oras ng Katotohanan (2003–2007)
- Tinig ng Kanyang Pagbabalik (2004–2007)

=== Other programs ===
- Eventure (2001)
- The H-Files (2001)

=== Movie blocks/specials ===
- ETC A-List (2008–2011)
- ETCinema (2020–2022)
- ETC Flix (2013–2018, 2020–2022)
- ETC Music Specials (2013–2019)
- ETC Presents (2013–2019)
- Mondays Hollywood Big Hits
- Thursday Ninja Specials
- Tuesday War Movies
- Wednesday Sci-Fi Theatre

=== Music ===
- SBN Karaoke (2001–2006)
- SBN Music Videos (2000–2007)

=== TV shopping ===
- EZ Shop (2022)
- Home Shopping Network (2004–2007)
- Metro TV
- New Life TV Shopping
- Sell-A-Vision
- Shop TV (2022–2023)
- The Quantum Channel (1996–2005)
- TV Window Shop
- Value Vision (1998–2007)
- Winner TV Shopping (2002–2007)

=== Sports ===
- Jai-Alai Games (2003)
- World TV Boxing

^{1}in cooperation with ETC/Talk TV/Solar News Channel

== Foreign defunct shows ==
- 2 Broke Girls (2013–2017)
- 20/20
- 60 Minutes^{1} (2012–2013)
- A to Z (2014–2015)
- ABC World News
- Age of Love^{1}
- Ambush Makeover^{1}
- American Dreams^{1}
- American Idol ^{1} (2014–16, 2018–2020)
- America's Best Dance Crew^{1}
- America's Funniest Home Videos
- America's Funniest People
- America's Next Top Model^{1} (2008–2011, 2013–2015, 2016–present)
- Anderson Live^{1} (2011–2013)
- Assignment: Earth
- Average Joe^{1}
- B-fighter
- B-fighter Kabuto
- Bachelor Pad^{1}
- Bad Girls Club
- Beauty & the Beast^{1} (2013–2016)
- Beauty and the Geek
- Blind Date
- Blood, Sweat & Heels
- Brave New Girls
- Breaking Up with Shannen Doherty
- Broke Back Mountain: The Animated Series
- Built^{1} (2014)
- Candid Camera
- Candidly Nicole
- Camp^{1}
- Celebrity Night of Music and Dance
- Change of Heart
- Changeman
- Chasing Maria Menounos^{1}
- Chelsea Lately^{1} (2008–2010)
- Child's Play
- City Girl Diaries^{1} (2014)
- CNN Headline News
- CNN Showbiz
- CNN World News
- Complete Savages
- Dates
- Date My Mom^{1}
- Dateline NBC^{1} (2011)
- Dirty Dancing^{1}
- Dracula (2015)
- Dress My Nest
- Dukes of Melrose
- E! News^{1} (2008–2011)
- Early Today^{1} (2011–2013)
- Earthwatch
- Ed^{1}
- ElimiDate
- Emergency Call
- Emily Owens, M.D.^{1}
- Entourage^{1}
- Everwood^{1}
- EWTN
- Eye Candy^{1}
- Farmer Wants a Wife^{1}
- Finding Carter
- Foody Call^{1}
- For the Juniors
- For Love or Money^{1}
- Formal Wars^{1} (2014–2015)
- Four Weddings
- Freddie^{1}
- Friday Night Lights^{1}
- Friends^{1} (2008–2011, 2013–2014)
- Friends with Better Lives^{1}
- Froggy Call^{1}
- Gallery Girls^{1}
- Gerber
- Girls Behaving Badly^{1}
- Glee^{1} (2009–2011, 2013–2015)
- Good Morning, Miami^{1}
- Gossip Girl^{1} (2008–2011)
- Here Come the Newlyweds^{1} (2009–2010)
- High School Confidential
- High School Reunion^{1}
- Hindsight
- House of Carters^{1}
- Hot Guys Who Cook
- How I Met Your Mother^{1} (2008–2011)
- I Propose
- Inside Edition^{1} ETC: (2008–2011; 2018–present), Talk TV: (2011–2012), Solar News Channel: (2012–2013)
- Is She Really Going Out With Him?
- iZombie (2015–2019)
- Jake in Progress (2008–2009)
- Joan of Arcadia^{1} (2008)
- Just Say No
- Keeping Up with the Kardashians^{1} (2008–2011)
- Kendra (2010–2011)
- Kitchen Confidential^{1}
- Knock First^{1}
- Launch My Line^{1} (2010–2011)
- Late Night with Conan O'Brien^{1}
- Late Show with David Letterman^{1} World TV: (1993–1996), ETC: (2008), Talk TV: (2011–2012), Solar News Channel: (2012–2013)
- Make Me a Supermodel^{1}
- Married Away
- Masked Rider Black
- Material Girl^{1}
- Meet My Folks^{1}
- Miss Advised^{1}
- MLB on World TV
- Mr. Squiggle and Friends
- Models NYC (2009)
- Models of the Runway (2010–2011)
- Mondays Hollywood Big Hits
- Momma's Boys^{1} (2010)
- Movie Juice
- Mulligrubs
- My Boys
- My Crazy Love (2015)
- NBC Nightly News^{1} (Talk TV/Solar News Channel: 2011–2013)
- New Girl (2013–2018)
- New Life TV Shopping
- New York Fashion Week: Catwalk Review
- New Zoo Revue
- Newshour
- Nightline
- Nikita^{1}
- Nip/Tuck^{1}
- NYC Prep^{1} (2010–2011)
- One Tree Hill^{1} (2008–2011)
- Open House Overhaul
- Outback Jack^{1}
- Parental Control^{1}
- Pitch
- Playschool
- Powerless
- Pretty Little Liars^{1} (2010–2011, 2013–2017)
- Pretty Wicked^{1} (2010)
- Primetime Live
- Privileged^{1} (2009–2010)
- Project Runway^{1} (2008–2011; 2013–2019)
- Project Runway: All Stars
- Project Runway: Threads
- Project Runway: Under the Gunn (2015–2016)
- Pussycat Dolls Present: Girlicious
- Pussycat Dolls Present: The Search for the Next Doll^{1}
- Quarterlife^{1}
- Queer Eye for the Straight Guy^{1}
- Ravenswood^{1}
- Ready for Love^{1}
- Relationship Rehab
- SBN Music Videos (Sony and BMG)
- Sally Jessy Raphaël / Sally
- Saturday Night Live^{1}
- Seinfeld^{1}
- Selfie (2015)
- Sell-a-Vision
- Sexiest^{1}
- Shear Genius^{1}
- Snoop Dogg's Father Hood^{1}
- Solar News Channel Presents: Stories^{1} (2013)
- Split Ends^{1}
- Stalker (2014–2015)
- Star-Crossed^{1} (2014)
- Step It Up and Dance^{1}
- Super Bowl
- Super Fun Night^{1} (2013–2014)
- Super Rescue Solbrain
- Superboy
- Takeshi's Castle
- The 5th Wheel^{1}
- The A-List
- The Adventures of Wonder Woman
- The Arsenio Hall Show
- The Bachelor^{1}
- The Bachelor: Rome^{1}
- The Bachelorette^{1}
- The Carrie Diaries^{1} (2013–2014)
- The Catalina^{1} (2013)
- The Class^{1}
- The Daily 10^{1} (2008–2011)
- The Dish^{1}
- The Fashion Fund
- The Fashion Show
- The Flying Doctors
- The Game^{1}
- The Girls of the Playboy Mansion^{1}
- The Insider^{1} (2013–2017)
- The Jamie Kennedy Experiment^{1}
- The Lying Game^{1} (2014)
- The Millionaire Matchmaker^{1} (2009–2011, 2013–2016)
- The Next Big Thing: New York^{1}
- The O.C.^{1}
- The Originals^{1} (2013–2018)
- The Phil Donahue Show
- The Rachel Zoe Project^{1} (2009–2011; 2014)
- The Shepherd's Voice
- The Simple Life^{1}
- The Spectacular World of Guinness Records
- The Talk^{1} (2011–2013)
- The Tonight Show with Jay Leno^{1} (2011–2013)
- Thursday Ninja Specials
- Tim Gunn's Guide to Style^{1}
- Titans^{1} (2012)
- TMZ^{1} (2008–2011, 2013–2018)
  - TMZ Weekend (2008–2009)
- The Tudors
- Today^{1} (2011–2013)
- Today Weekend^{1} (2011–2013)
- Today's Talk^{1} (2011–2013)
- Top 20 (2016)
- Top Gear^{1} (2012–2013)
- True Beauty^{1} (2011)
- Try My Life^{1}
- Tuesday War Movies
- The Tyra Banks Show^{1} (2008–2011)
- Ultimate Style^{1}
- Undercover Boss^{1} (2012–2013)
- Underemployed
- Unhitched^{1}
- Value Vision (1996–2007)
- The Vampire Diaries^{1} (2010–2011, 2013–2017)
- Veronica Mars^{1} (2008)
- Voltron (later on ABS-CBN in 2000)
- Wednesday Sci-Fi Theatre
- Welcome to the Parker^{1}
- What I Like About You^{1}
- What It Takes
- Who Wants to Marry My Dad?^{1}
- Wildfire^{1}
- Will and Grace^{1}
- World News Tonight
- World TV Boxing
- Yan Can Cook

^{1}in cooperation with ETC/Talk TV/Solar News Channel

== Defunct shows on ETC/SolarFlix ==
=== Local shows ===
- Chill Spot (2008–2009)
- Etcetera (2011–2015)
- ETC HQ (2012–2013)
- The Journey to the Crown (2016–2017)
- Rated Oh! (2004–2008)
- Stylized (2014)

=== Foreign shows ===
- 2 Broke Girls (2011–2017)
- Age of Love
- Ambush Makeover
- American Dreams
- American Idol (2012–2016; 2018–2020)
- America's Best Dance Crew
- America's Next Top Model
- Average Joe
- Bachelor Pad
- Bachelorette Party Las Vegas
- Beauty & the Beast (2012–2016)
- Bitten
- Bubble Up
- Candidly Nicole (2014–2016)
- Chelsea Lately (2008–2010)
- Cyrus vs. Cyrus: Design and Conquer (2020)
- Date My Mom
- Dirty Dancing
- E! News
- Ed
- Emily Owens, M.D.
- Endless Love
- Entertainment Tonight (2004–2007, 2018–2020)
- Entourage
- ETC A-List
- Everwood
- Everywhere I Go (2020, 2021)
- Extra (2011–2018)
- Faking It
- Famous in Love (2017–2018)
- Fashion Hunters
- For Love or Money
- Freddie
- Friday Night Lights
- Friends (2005–2014)
- Friends to Lovers?
- Friends with Benefits
- Friends with Better Lives (2014)
- Froggy Call
- Gallery Girls
- Get Out of My Room (2020)
- Girls Behaving Badly
- Glee (2009–2015)
- Guest Star (2019)
- Good Morning, Miami
- Gossip Girl (2007–2012)
- Hayat (2021)
- Hellcats
- Here Come the Newlyweds
- High School Reunion
- House of Carters
- House of Glam
- House of Jazmin
- How I Met Your Mother (2006–2011)
- Is She Really Going Out With Him?
- Jake in Progress (2007–2009)
- Jane the Virgin (2019–2021)
- Joan of Arcadia
- Keeping Up with the Kardashians
- Kitchen Confidential
- Knock First
- Kourtney and Kim Take Miami
- Last Comic Standing
- Late Night with Conan O'Brien
- LA to Vegas (2018)
- Life Sentence (2018)
- Madam Secretary (2020)
- Make Me a Supermodel
- Making It (2021)
- Meet My Folks
- Miss Advised (2013)
- Models of the Runway (2010–2013)
- My Boys
- NBC Nightly News (2004–2007)
- New Girl (2011–2018)
- Nikita (2011–2014)
- Nip/Tuck (2004–2007)
- One Tree Hill (2004–2012)
- Outback Jack
- Parental Control
- Pretty Little Liars (2010–2017)
- Privileged
- Project Accessory
- Project Runway: Fashion Startup (2018)
- Project Runway (2005–2019)
- Project Runway Philippines (2008–2015)
- Pussycat Dolls Present: The Search for the Next Doll
- Quarterlife
- Queer Eye for the Straight Guy
- Ravenswood (2013–2014)
- Reign (2013–2017)
- Revenge Body with Khloé Kardashian (2018–2019)
- Saturday Night Live
- Scream Queens (2015–2016)
- Sexiest
- Shear Genius
- Significant Others (2004–2007)
- Split Ends
- Starting Over
- Step It Up and Dance
- Style Factory
- Sweet Home Oklahoma
- The Bachelor
- The Bachelorette
- The Catalina (2013)
- The Class
- The Daily 10
- The Dish
- The Expandables
- The F Word
- The Fashion Show
- The Game
- The Girls of the Playboy Mansion
- The Glee Project
- The Jamie Kennedy Experiment
- The Lying Game (2012–2014)
- The Millionaire Matchmaker (2009–2016)
- The Next Big Thing: NY
- The Next: Fame Is at Your Doorstep
- The O.C. (2004–2008)
- The Originals
- The Rachel Zoe Project (2009–2014)
- The Secret Circle
- The Simple Life
- The World According to Paris (2012)
- Tim Gunn's Guide to Style
- Today (2004–2005)
- Top Chef Junior (season 2) (2020–2021)
- TMZ on TV (2008–2018, 2019–2020)
- True Beauty
- Try My Life
- The Tyra Banks Show (2005–2011)
- Ultimate Style
- The Vampire Diaries (2010–2017)
- Veronica Mars (2005–2008)
- Welcome to the Parker
- What I Like About You
- Who Lives Here?
- Who Wants to Marry My Dad?
- Wildfire
- Will & Grace
- Zoey's Extraordinary Playlist (2020–2021)

=== Sports specials on ETC ===
- 2008 Beijing Olympics (together with C/S, 2nd Avenue, Jack TV, Solar Sports and Basketball TV)

== Sports specials ==
- 2008 Beijing Olympics^{1}
- 2012 London Olympics^{13}
- Super Bowl 1993
- Cotto vs. Mayweather HBO Sports 24/7 Documentary Special^{2} (2012)
- National Cheerleading Championship: 2016 Qualifiers^{12} (January 23 – February 13, 2016)
- National Cheerleading Championship 2016 National Finals^{12} (March 19–20, 2016)
- Pacquiao vs. Marquez HBO Sports 24/7 Documentary Special^{2} (2011)
- Pacquiao vs. Mosley HBO Sports 24/7 Documentary Special^{2} (2011)
- Pacquiao vs. Rios HBO Sports 24/7 Documentary Special^{2} (November 2013)

^{1}in cooperation with ETC/Talk TV/Solar News Channel
^{2}in cooperation with Solar Sports
^{3}in cooperation with Sports5

== Special coverage/TV specials ==
- 2000 Today (1999–2000)
- American Idol season 13 Grand Finale^{1} (May 22, 2014)
- American Idol season 14 Grand Finale^{1} (May 13 and 14, 2015)
- American Idol: The Farewell Season: Grand Finale Week^{1} (April 6–8, 2016)
- American Idol season 16 Grand Finale Week^{1} (May 21 and 22, 2018)
- American Idol season 17 Grand Finale^{1} (May 20, 2019)
- The 59th Annual Grammy Awards 2017^{1} (February 13, 2017)
- The 60th Annual Grammy Awards 2018^{1} (January 29, 2018)
- The 61st Annual Grammy Awards 2019^{1} (February 11, 2019)
- BBC Radio 1's: Big Weekend 2014^{1} (December 21, 2014, re-run, May 9, 2015)
- Beyonce: Destined for Stardom (December 12, 2015)
- Coldplay: Ghost Stories^{1} (December 28, 2014, re-run, May 23, 2015)
- Election 2013^{2} (May 10–11, 2013)
- News.PH: Miting de Avance Special^{1} (May 1 and 8, 2013)
- Impeachment of Renato Corona^{1} (January 16–May 2012)
- FIRST: The Story of the London 2012 Olympic Games^{1} (February 23, 2013)
- State of the Nation Address (July 1992-July 2007, July 2012-July 2013)^{1}
- 2013 US Presidential Elections Coverage^{1} (November 2012)
- Congressional Debate on RH Bill^{1} (December 12 and 17, 2012)
- Ed Sheeran: Live in Dublin^{1} (February 14, 2015)
- Jason Mraz: Live at the Avocado Ranch^{1} (December 28, 2014)
- Jason Mraz Special^{1} (October 25 and 27, 2014)
- JT: Reflections (May 21, 2016)
- Miss Universe 2016^{1} (January 30, 2017)
- Olivia Newton-John: Hopelessly Devoted to You (October 10, 2018)
- Philippine Fashion Week: Spring Summer^{1} (February 7 and 21, 2016)
- Philippine Fashion Week: Holiday 2016^{1} (July 3 – August 7, 2016)
- Senate Probe on Pork Barrel^{1} (August–November 2013)
- 2012: A Solar News Year End Report^{1} (December 31, 2012)
- Teen Choice Awards 2014^{1} (August 11, 2014)
- Teen Choice Awards 2015^{1} (August 17, 2015)
- Teen Choice Awards 2016^{1} (August 1, 2016)
- Teen Choice Awards 2017^{1} (August 14, 2017)
- TownHall: Ninoy, The Shot that Rang Out ^{1} (August 21, 2013)
- TownHall: Throwback Martial Law: Never Again ^{1} (September 20, 2013)
- TownHall: Aftershocks^{1} (October 18, 2013)
- Macy's Thanksgiving Day Parade^{1} (2012–2013)
- Gaga by Gaultier^{1} (February 14, 2014)
- Skechers Street Dance Battle Finals Night (2008–2010, 2013–2014)
  - Skechers Streetdance Battle : Year 4^{1} (December 14 and 21, 2008)
  - Skechers Streetdance Battle : Year 5^{1} (December 13 and 20, 2009)
  - Skechers Streetdance Battle : Year 6^{1} (December 12 and 19, 2010)
  - Skechers Streetdance Battle : Year 9^{1} (December 8 and 15, 2013)
  - Skechers Streetdance Battle : Year 10^{1} (December 7 and 14, 2014)
- MEGA Fashion Crew Reloaded in Paris TV Special^{1} (June 14, 2014)
- The Today Show Toyota Concert Series^{1} (May 25 – September 21, 2013)
- MEGA YDC20 Special^{1} (April 26, May 3 and 10, 2015)

^{1}in cooperation with ETC/Talk TV/Solar News Channel

== See also ==
- Nine Media Corporation
- Southern Broadcasting Network
- Solar Entertainment Corporation
- SolarFlix
- List of programs broadcast by SolarFlix
