= Deliver Me (American TV series) =

American reality television series

- Written by: (Varies by episode)
- Starring: Dr. Yvonne Bohn; Dr. Allison Hill; Dr. Alane Park; Dr. Cliff Bochner
- Narrated by: Dr. Yvonne Bohn; Dr. Allison Hill; Dr. Alane Park
- Theme music composer: Arden Kaywin & Ziv
- Composer: (Varies by episode)
- Country of origin: United States
- No. of seasons: 4
- No. of episodes: 32

Production
- Executive producer: Eric Schiff
- Producer: (Varies by episode)
- Production location: Los Angeles, California
- Running time: 60 minutes (including commercials)
- Production company: Banyan Productions in association with Eric Schiff Productions

Original release
- Network: Discovery Health Channel (2008-2010); OWN: Oprah Winfrey Network (2011)
- Release: March 4, 2008 – November 19, 2011

Deliver Me is a reality television series airing on Discovery Life. The show is centered on three female doctors in Los Angeles, California who are partners in a high-risk OB/GYN practice. The show follows a selection of their patients' trials and tribulations with pregnancy as well as the doctors' own lives. The general theme is depicted in the opening montage: "Three mothers, Three friends, Three doctors -- One practice." Each doctor narrates the scenes for her own patient or situation.

Dr. Clifford (Cliff) Bochner, the only male doctor to appear regularly (first appeared in episode 1), is a specialist (perinatologist) whom the practice consults for the most difficult cases. Dr. John Jain, a reproductive endocrinologist and Dr. Hill's ex-husband, appeared in a few episodes when Dr. Hill had eggs frozen for later implantation and for Dr. Bohn's successful in-vitro fertilization (featured in Season 3).

The series premiered on Discovery Health Channel on March 4, 2008. Season 3 began on June 16, 2009 and concluded on October 27, 2009 with a total of ten episodes. Deliver Me was one of two original Discovery Health series (the other was Mystery Diagnosis) to be continued when the channel was replaced by OWN in January 2011. Season 4 debuted May 1, 2011 and ended November 19, 2011. When OWN cancelled the series, reruns moved to Discovery Health's replacement, Discovery Fit & Health, now known as Discovery Life.

== Other projects ==
The trio also hosted a July 16, 2010 Discovery Health "Baby Week 2010" special about The 10 Most Unbelievable Births shown on the channel (including their series, I'm Pregnant and..., and I Didn't Know I Was Pregnant), and wrote The Mommy Docs' Ultimate Guide to Pregnancy and Birth (with Melissa Jo Peltier), published May 3, 2011.

== Episodes ==
=== Series overview ===
Season	Episodes	Originally released	
Season	Episodes	First released	Last released
1	7	March 4, 2008	May 11, 2008
2	10	November 11, 2008	March 24, 2009
3	10	June 16, 2009	October 27, 2009
4	5	May 1, 2011	November 19, 2011

=== Season 1 (2008) ===
No. overall	No. in season	Title	Original release date
1	1	"Doctors and Mothers"	March 4, 2008
2	2	"Expecting the Unexpected"	March 11, 2008
3	3	"Size Matters"	March 18, 2008
4	4	"First Fears"	March 25, 2008
5	5	"Eleventh Hour"	April 1, 2008
6	6	"Crash Course"	April 8, 2008
7	7	"Now or Never"	May 11, 2008

=== Season 2 (2008-2009) ===
No. overall	No. in season	Title	Original release date
8	1	"Out of Control"	November 11, 2008
9	2	"Holding Fast"	November 18, 2008
10	3	"Safe Passage"	November 25, 2008
11	4	"Bringing It On"	December 2, 2008
12	5	"Fighting Chance"	February 17, 2009
13	6	"No Matter What"	February 24, 2009
14	7	"Rhythm of Life"	March 3, 2009
15	8	"Don't Look Back"	March 10, 2009
16	9	"Best Laid Plans"	March 17, 2009
17	10	"Word to the Wise"	March 24, 2009

=== Season 3 (2009) ===
No. overall	No. in season	Title	Original release date
18	1	"High Hopes"	June 16, 2009
19	2	"Saying Goodbye"	June 23, 2009
20	3	"Stitch in Time"	June 30, 2009
21	4	"To the Mat"	July 7, 2009
22	5	"In the Cards"	September 22, 2009
23	6	"No Fear"	September 29, 2009
24	7	"The Doctor Delivers"	October 6, 2009
25	8	"Whatever Works"	October 13, 2009
26	9	"Back on Board"	October 20, 2009
27	10	"Inside Job"	October 27, 2009

=== Season 4 (2011) ===
No. overall	No. in season	Title	Original release date
28	1	"Trouble and Grace"	May 1, 2011
29	2	"Tough Enough"	November 19, 2011
30	3	"Paid in Full"	November 19, 2011
31	4	"Time Tells"	November 19, 2011
32	5	"On the Brink"	November 19, 2011

== Spin-offs ==
=== Deliver Me: Home Edition ===
Deliver Me: Home Edition ran on Discovery Health from December 26, 2008 to May 1, 2009. This 30 episode half-hour update series differs from the main series in that Rebecca Flint narrates the entire episode, it covers one or two pregnancies from earlier Deliver Me episodes from start to finish plus a follow-up with the families 9–10 months later (hence the "Home Edition" tag), and does not include the doctors' personal lives. Reruns of Deliver Me: Home Edition began airing on OWN in February 2011 until cancellation of the main series.
