= I'm Pregnant and... =

- Country of origin: United States
- No. of seasons: 3
- No. of episodes: 20

Production
- Executive producers: Valerie Haselton Drescher, Rebecca Toth Diefenbach
- Running time: 30 minutes (including commercials)
- Production company: Sirens Media LLC

Original release
- Network: Discovery Health Channel (2009–2010); Discovery Life (2011)
- Release: December 1, 2009 – September 29, 2011

I'm Pregnant and... is an American reality television series broadcast on Discovery Fit & Health. The series tells the stories of women who face serious emotional, physical or mental issues or circumstances during their pregnancies. The ellipsis in the series title acts as a blank, filled in by the title of the week's episode; e.g.: "I'm Pregnant and... A Nudist" or "I'm Pregnant and... Homeless".

The series began on Discovery Health Channel on November 10, 2009. Season 1 concluded on December 29, 2009, after 6 episodes. Season 2 ran from July 20, 2010, to October 19, 2010, with 8 episodes. Season 3 ran from September 1 to 29, 2011, with 6 episodes.

The series moved to Discovery Fit & Health in 2011 after OWN replaced Discovery Health. Select episodes returned to OWN in April 2011 as one of several series from OWN's sister networks (also including Discovery Channel, TLC, Animal Planet and Investigation Discovery) to fill gaps in OWN's programming while they built their own library of original programs.

== Social significance/issues ==
The issues or circumstances covered have social significance or consequences that make the casual viewer question why that mother is pregnant in the first place, and answer that question as the show unfolds. This is a notable departure from other pregnancy-themed reality series such as Deliver Me or I Didn't Know I Was Pregnant, where the pregnancies are not so socially complicated.

== Episodes ==
No.	Title	Original release date
1	"In Prison"	November 10, 2009
2	"So Is My Daughter"	December 1, 2009
3	"Homeless"	December 8, 2009
4	"Have an Eating Disorder"	December 15, 2009
5	"55 Years Old"	December 22, 2009
6	"Bi-Polar"	December 29, 2009
7	"May Be Having a Dwarf"	July 20, 2010
8	"A Drug Dealer"	July 27, 2010
9	"A Hoarder"	August 17, 2010
10	"HIV Positive"	August 24, 2010
11	"A Nudist"	August 31, 2010
12	"Have OCD"	October 5, 2010
13	"Have Cancer"	October 12, 2010
14	"Morbidly Obese"	October 19, 2010
15	"My Husband Wants to Become a Woman"	September 1, 2011
16	"A Little Person"	September 1, 2011
17	"Addicted to Crystal Meth"	September 8, 2011
18	"I Sniff Toxic Fumes"	September 15, 2011
19	"A Stripper"	September 22, 2011
20	"A Trucker"	September 29, 2011
