= Call 911 =

Call 911 may refer to:

- Call 911 (song)
- Call 911 (TV series)
