= Shimmy (TV series) =

- Genre: Fitness
- Written by: Kim Pechet
- Directed by: Ian Kerr
- Starring: Gillian Cofsky, Shivaun Corry, Simone Leblanc
- Narrated by: Kim Pechet
- Composer: Tim McCauley
- Country of origin: Canada
- Original language: English
- No. of seasons: 2
- No. of episodes: 26

Production
- Executive producers: Michael Chechik, Gabriela Schonbach
- Production locations: Vancouver, Canada
- Cinematography: Ian Kerr, CSC
- Running time: 23 min
- Production company: Omnifilm Entertainment

Original release
- Network: ONE
- Release: October 1, 2007

Shimmy is a fitness television series broadcast in Canada on ONE: The Mind and Body Channel that emphasizes the health benefits of belly dance. The twenty-six episode series was designed by and created by Kim Pechet, a belly dance instructor and fitness professional. An original Canadian production, Shimmy premiered October 1, 2007 on ACCESS and CLT in Canada as well as in the United States on Discovery Health and OWN. Shimmy has been broadcast throughout Central and South America, Germany, and India as well as in Canada and the United States.

== Episode structure ==
Each episode begins with a warm up to increase flexibility and to prepare the body for the teaching section. In the teaching section, each episode leads viewers through four to six belly dance movements. The repeated motions are designed to tone hips, thighs, glutes, and abdominals through traditional Middle-Eastern belly-dance movements. In the performance section, dancers in full costume combine the movements into a low-impact choreography designed to burn calories. The episode ends with a display of freestyle belly dance from the dancers.

== Episode list ==
=== Season 1 ===
Episode 1 "Hips, Hops and a Shimmy"

- Dance Level: beginner
- Fitness Category: calorie-burner
- Target Zones: hips and thighs
- Moves Taught: Shoulder Shimmy, Hip Rotation, 1-2-3-Hop, Hip Pop, Head Slide
- Synopsis: The Shimmy Dancers lead viewers through a series of fundamental belly dance moves. This episode is aimed towards beginners and those wanting to go back to basics.

Episode 2 "Cairo to Istanbul"

- Dance Level: beginner to intermediate
- Fitness Category: stretch and strengthen
- Target Zones: hips and glutes
- Moves Taught: Head Slide, Basic Egyptian Step, Hip Circles, Turkish Figure-Eight
- Synopsis: The variations taught in this episode aim to give dance routines an exotic flavour as Gillian leads viewers through the sensual 'Turkish figure-eight.'

Episode 3 "Sharp and Sexy with a Shimmy"

- Dance Level: beginner to intermediate
- Fitness Category: tighten and tone
- Target Zones: arms and hips
- Moves Taught: Hip-piston, Snake Arms, Expressive Hand Gestures, Three-Quarter Shimmy
- Synopsis: Expressive hand gestures aim to give performances an authentic feel, while moves like the ‘three-quarter shimmy’ will show your technical skills.

Episode 4 "The Hippy Camel"

- Dance Level: beginner
- Fitness Category: tighten and tone
- Target Zones: back and glutes
- Moves Taught: Shoulder Rolls, Village Shimmy, M and M's, Chest Camel
- Synopsis: The ‘chest camel’ and ‘shoulder rolls’ are fluid dance moves that help increase strength and flexibility. Adding on ‘M and M’s’ and a vigorous ‘village shimmy’, the Shimmy Dancers lead you through a perfect lunchtime office workout.

Episode 5 "From Camp to Cabaret"

- Dance Level: beginner
- Fitness Category: Calorie-Burner
- Target Zones: Thighs and Arms
- Moves Taught: Three-Step Turn, Hip Bounce, Ghawazee Step, Cabaret Shimmy, Side-Step Arm Sweep
- Synopsis: The Shimmy Dancers’ favorite combination in the series was the ‘Three Step Turn’ and ‘Hip Bounce’.

Episode 6 "The Sultan's Chest"

- Dance Level: beginner to intermediate
- Fitness Category: tighten and tone
- Target Zones: back and glutes
- Movies Taught: Step-Touch-Step, Egyptian Figure-Eight, Turkish Bump, Chest Circles, Liquid Arms
- Synopsis: ‘Chest circle’ and ‘liquid arms’ aim to ease shoulder and upper back pain from sitting at a computer, as well as prevent future aches by strengthening those muscles.

Episode 7 "The Hanging Garden"

- Dance Level: beginner
- Fitness Category: tighten and tone
- Target Zones: thighs and belly
- Moves Taught: Grapevine, Falling Leaves, Head Slide, Ronde de Jambe, Hip Circle
- Synopsis: The Shimmy Dancers display a variety of traditional and cabaret upper arm and hand movements like ‘Falling Leaves’ and how a basic travelling step like the ‘Grapevine’ and the ballet-inspired ‘Ronde de Jambe’ take on a sensual middle-eastern flavour simply by emphasizing the hip.

Episode 8 "Shimmies and Turns"

- Dance Level: intermediate to advanced
- Fitness Category: calorie-burner
- Target Zones: glutes and thighs
- Moves Taught: Shoulder Shimmy, Shimmy Layered Hip Circle, Cut Turn, Sa’idi Step, Hip Rotation, Tremor Layered Figure-Eight
- Synopsis: In this episode we practice moves like the ‘Cut Turn’ and a quick spin on the ‘Sa’idi Step’ to enable you to engage the audience members all around you.

Episode 9 "Hips and Hops on a Snake"

- Dance Level: beginner
- Fitness Category: calorie-burner
- Target Zone: glutes and arms
- Moves Taught: Hip Piston, Hip Pop, 1-2-3-Hop, Snake Arms
- Synopsis: The teaching section is excellent for those interested in tribal belly dance as we combine the sharp ‘Hip Piston’ with ‘Snake Arms’—a classic combo in tribal style.

Episode 10 "Hips Galore"

- Dance Level: beginner to intermediate
- Fitness Category: calorie-burner
- Target Zones: thighs and glutes
- Moves Taught: Three Step Turn, Hip Bounce, Maya Hips, Egyptian Figure-Eight
- Synopsis: In this episode highlights correct positioning and movement of the hips with moves like the playful ‘Hip Bounce,’ ‘Maya Hips,’ and the ultra-sexy ‘Egyptian Figure-Eight.’

Episode 11 "Salome and the Sultan"

- Dance Level:beginner to intermediate
- Fitness Category: tighten and tone
- Target Zones: glutes, hips and thighs
- Moves Taught: Head Slide, Hip Circle, Egyptian Figure Eight, Turkish Bump
- Synopsis: The moves from the teaching section represent some of the best-loved Middle-Eastern dance moves like the ‘Head Slide’ and the ‘Hip Circle’ while mastering the ‘Egyptian Figure-Eight’ and the ‘Turkish Bump,’ will make you a truly international dancer.

Episode 12 "Bellies in Beirut"

- Dance Level: intermediate to advanced
- Fitness Category: tighten and tone
- Target Zones: belly and back
- Moves Taught: Shoulder Rolls, Village Shimmy, Lebanese Hip-Circle, Zar Head, Belly Roll
- Synopsis: From the ‘Village Shimmy’, to the ‘Lebanese Hip-Circle’, to ‘Zar Head’, moves taken from Middle Eastern folk dances give this episode a particularly authentic feel while ‘Shoulder Rolls’ add sensuality.

Episode 13 "Ottoman Nights"

- Dance Level: advanced
- Fitness Category: calorie-burner
- Target Zones: glutes and thighs
- Moves Taught: Basic Egyptian Step, Turkish Figure-Eight, Shimmy Layered Hip Circle, Tremor Layered Figure-Eight, Sa’idi Step
- Synopsis: In this episode we take the basics to a new level, adding variations, to create the most challenging moves in the whole series: the ‘Tremor Layered Figure-Eight’ and the ‘Shimmy Layered Hip Circle’.

=== Season 2 ===
Episode 14 "Shimmying Circles": This episode begins with a gentle floor and standing warm-up. The teaching sequence covers moves such as the sensual ‘frontal chest circles’ and ‘liquid arms’, the flirty ‘shoulder shimmy’ and two variations of hip isolations: the ‘hip rotation’ and the ‘cut turn’. The performance combines these moves in a fluid choreography and inspiring freestyle belly dance finale.

Episode 15 "Camel in the Cabaret": This episode begins with a relaxing warm-up that prepares the body to dance. Five core moves are showcased in the teaching sequence: the ‘ghawazee step’, ‘m and m’s’, the ‘cabaret shimmy’, the ‘chest-camel’, and the beautiful ‘side-step arm-sweep’. The choreography section provides the viewers an opportunity to practice these moves in sequence. The finale is a lively display of freestyle belly dance.

Episode 16 "Hop through Flames": This episode begins with a gentle combination of stretches and warm-up exercises. The teaching sequence demonstrates the sensual ‘flame’ and ‘ripple’ and the energetic ‘1,2,3 hop’ and ‘hip pop’. For the performance, viewers display these moves in an authentic belly dance choreography. The finale of the episode is a gorgeous display of freestyle belly dance.

Episode 17 "Slides, Turns and Layers": This episode begins with a combination of gentle warm-up moves. In the teaching sequence the viewers practice ‘head-slides’, ‘hip-circles’, and the more challenging ‘shimmy-layered hip-circles’, ‘tremor figure-eights’ and ‘sa’idi turns’. The combined moves are demonstrated in the choreography section and showcased in a beautiful freestyle belly dance finale.

Episode 18 "The Camel's Garden": This episode guides viewers through a gentle warm-up introduction. The teaching sequence introduces the traveling step ‘grapevine’ and the elegant ‘falling leaves’. Familiar moves such as the ‘hip-down ronde-de-jambe’, the ‘m and m’s’ and the beautiful ‘chest camel’ are also practiced. The episode closes with a freestyle belly dance.

Episode 19 "Turns with a Bounce": This episode begins with a gentle warm-up of stretches that prepares the body to dance. The teaching sequence includes the ‘three-step turn’, ‘hip-bounce’, expressive ‘facial gestures’, and the challenging ‘three-quarter shimmy’. The performance sequence combines these moves into an exhilarating choreography. The episode concludes with a freestyle belly dance.

Episode 20 "The Camel and the Snake": This episode begins with a gentle but thorough warm up that prepares the body to dance. In the teaching sequence, viewers practice the ‘chest camel’ and the ‘ripple’ which are then combined with the sultry ‘full camel.’ ‘Hip pistons’ and ‘snake arms’ are added to create an authentic belly dance choreography. A freestyle finale concludes the episode.

Episode 21 "Ethnic Fluidity": This episode prepares the viewers to dance with a gentle warm-up. The teaching sequence includes: ‘chest-circles’, ‘liquid-arms’, ‘shoulder-rolls’, and the energetic ‘village-shimmy’. Viewers are given the opportunity to use what they have practiced in a choreographed belly dance performance. Finally, inspiration transforms these moves into a freestyle belly dance finale.

Episode 22 "Turkish Delight": This episode begins with a relaxing warm-up that prepares the body to dance. The teaching sequence demonstrates three hip moves: the ‘basic Egyptian step’, the ‘Turkish figure eight’ and ‘m and m’s’ and the sensual upper body move: the ‘chest camel’. The episode concludes with a beautiful dance choreography and inspiring freestyle belly dance.

Episode 23 "Rippling": This episode begins with a combination of warm-up moves to prepare the body to dance. The teaching sequence includes the ‘chest camel’, the ‘ripple’, the sultry ‘full camel’, the traveling step ‘grapevine’, as well as the elegant ‘falling leaves’ and ‘hip-down ronde de jambe’. These movements then take shape in a fun and energetic choreography. Closing is a transformation of these moves into a freestyle belly dance.

Episode 24 "Down the Nile": This episode begins with seated and standing warm-up moves. The teaching sequence breaks down and demonstrates five authentic belly dance moves: the hip isolations ‘maya hips’ and its reverse, the ‘Egyptian figure-eight’, the ‘cabaret shimmy’, the ‘ghawazee step’, and the ‘side-step arm-sweep’. . The performance sequence combines these moves into a lively and fun belly dance choreography. The finale is a mesmerizing display of freestyle belly dance.

Episode 25 "Slithering Circles": This episode begins with a gentle combination of stretches and warm-up exercises. The teaching sequence practices key belly dance moves such as ‘Hip Piston’ and ‘Snake Arms’ as well as the more challenging ‘Belly Rolls,’ ‘Lebanese Hip Circles, and the ‘Zar Head’. The combined moves are demonstrated in the choreography section and showcased in a freestyle belly dance finale.

Episode 26 "Bumps": This episode begins with a gentle combination of movements in preparation for dancing. The teaching sequence leads the viewers through the energetic ‘1,2,3 Hop’ and ‘Hip Pop’, the ‘Turkish Bump’, and the ‘Egyptian Figure Eight’. The finale guides the viewers through an exciting choreography of what they've just learned and concludes with stunning freestyle belly dance.

== Awards ==
Shimmy won the 2008 Leo Award for Best Cinematography for an Information or Lifestyle Series for the Episode "Slithering and Circling". The show was also nominated for Best Information or Lifestyle Series and Best Direction in an Information or Lifestyle Series.
