= List of Mystery Diagnosis episodes =

The following is an episode list of the Discovery Health Channel, and later OWN, series, Mystery Diagnosis.

== Series overview ==
| Season | Episodes | Originally released | | |
| Season | Episodes | First released | Last released | Network |
|---|---|---|---|---|
| 1 | 9 | March 7, 2005 | December 5, 2005 | Discovery Health Channel |
| 2 | 10 | January 9, 2006 | June 19, 2006 | Discovery Health Channel |
| 3 | 8 | April 9, 2007 | September 3, 2007 | Discovery Health Channel |
| 4 | 6 | October 8, 2007 | December 17, 2007 | Discovery Health Channel |
| 5 | 10 | January 14, 2008 | April 14, 2008 | Discovery Health Channel |
| 6 | 12 | November 24, 2008 | April 20, 2009 | Discovery Health Channel |
| 7 | 8 | August 10, 2009 | November 30, 2009 | Discovery Health Channel |
| 8 | 6 | March 8, 2010 | April 12, 2010 | Discovery Health Channel |
| 9 | 10 | June 7, 2010 | October 4, 2010 | Discovery Health Channel |
| 10 | 10 | January 5, 2011 | June 29, 2011 | OWN |

== Episodes ==
=== Season 1 (2005) ===
| No. overall | No. in season | Title | Original release date |
|---|---|---|---|
| 1 | 1 | "Grasping For Straws" | March 7, 2005 |
A baby girl's face mysteriously swells up; A basketball player has pain in his joints; Doctors are baffled by a woman's mysterious gastrointestinal problem. Featuring Cushing's syndrome, gout, carcinoid cancer.
| 2 | 2 | "Like Mother, Like Son" | October 16, 2005 |
A child with celiac disease is intolerant of gluten; a woman has her left frontal lobe removed to stop seizures; another woman suffers from fatigue and mood swings. Featuring celiac disease, mitral valve prolapse (MVP), epilepsy.
| 3 | 3 | "Not A Normal Newborn" | October 21, 2005 |
A child with Hurler's disease undergoes a stem-cell transplant procedure; a woman is diagnosed with myasthenia gravis; A father has seizures and fainting spells due to a heart arrhythmia. Featuring Hurler syndrome, myasthenia gravis, cardiac arrhythmia.
| 4 | 4 | "Isaac's Nightmare" | October 28, 2005 |
A young boy's body is not producing antibodies to fight infections; a cancerous tumor must be removed; a woman loses the ability to walk. Featuring common variable immunodeficiency (CVID), gastrointestinal stromal tumor (GIST), reflex sympathetic dystrophy (RSD).
| 5 | 5 | "Why is Emily Screaming?" | November 4, 2005 |
A baby who cries and holds her cheek; a woman who gained 100 pounds in three months and developed severe acne; and an avid athlete struggling to catch his breath. Featuring trigeminal neuralgia, polyendocrine metabolic ovarian syndrome and alpha-1 antitrypsin deficiency.
| 6 | 6 | "Blood & Fire" | November 11, 2005 |
A firefighter and paramedic is diagnosed with acquired immunodeficiency syndrome (AIDS); A 12-year-old girl experiences abdominal pains and severe headaches until she is diagnosed with a retroflexed odontoid and Chiari One malformation.
| 7 | 7 | "Desperate For A Cure" | November 28, 2005 |
A 5-year-old has a persistent fever and stomachache. A man crippled with a neck tilt. A woman falls ill after traveling abroad. Featuring Crohn's disease, cervical dystonia, brucellosis.
| 8 | 8 | "Blood Brothers" | December 5, 2005 |
Two brothers suffer the same heart problem. Joanne suffers from joint pain, mouth ulcers, genital sores, skin lesions, and vision problems. Featuring Barth Syndrome, Behcet's Disease

=== Season 2 (2006) ===
| No. overall | No. in season | Title | Original release date |
|---|---|---|---|
| 10 | 1 | "A Puff of Smoke" | January 9, 2006 |
A baby, Daphne, is irritable, has trouble nursing and stops gaining weight. When the infant begins suffering repeated seizures and eventually begins sustaining rapid-onset cerebral ischemia, she is diagnosed with moyamoya disease, and must be treated before she suffers lethal brain damage from the repeated ischemic incidents. A man, Larry, initially diagnosed with hypoglycemia finds out he's got a tumor in his lung. A woman, Heather battling coughs, hives, and muscle weakness, was revealed to have an elevated eosinophil count. She is eventually diagnosed with a rare autoimmune disorder.
| 11 | 2 | "An Unquenchable Thirst" | January 16, 2006 |
A baby, Joey, drinks excessively, projectile vomits and stops growing. A professional baseball player's wife struggles to get pregnant due to a brain tumor. An old man is robbed of his eyesight.
| 12 | 3 | "Lethal Diet" | January 22, 2006 |
Parents deal with a son with sinus infections and unsteady feet; a woman gains weight and has oily skin, hair loss, body cramps and irritable bowel syndrome. A reverend has trouble sleeping.
| 13 | 4 | "Falling Through the Cracks" | March 6, 2006 |
A man has suffered from vertigo and ear infections since childhood. A 16-year-old girl has headaches and neck twitching, that led to preeclampsia. A girl has a serious heart condition and stops growing and gaining weight.
| 14 | 5 | "Eaten Alive" | March 27, 2006 |
A baby's hair appears brittle, and she is slow in developing after a case of whooping cough. Following a hernia repair procedure, Jackie contracted a flesh-eating disease. A boy develops nosebleeds, a sign of something much more terrifying.
| 15 | 6 | "The Man Who Never Sweats" | April 3, 2006 |
A baby shows signs of a genetic disorder. A college graduate developed bloating, decreased sex drive, and yellowing of the eyes. Since childhood, Scott has battled an array of symptoms—severe joint pain, strange rashes, and an inability to sweat. Could his symptoms be related to his kidneys?
| 16 | 7 | "Fatal Secret" | April 10, 2006 |
Roman was a baby when his parents noticed his head always tilting to one side and his eyes rolling back into his head when he looked up. Could the cause be just one condition? Sharon was an active varsity diver but after a car accident, she developed an unquenchable thirst that would soon take over her life. Peggy lived a healthy and active lifestyle, until one day when the mother of two experienced coughing, joint pain, and swelling.
| 17 | 8 | "The Stabbing Sensation" | June 5, 2006 |
Nicky was a healthy five-year-old boy until terrifying symptoms landed him in the hospital, fighting for his life. Kristine was a super mom until crippling abdominal pains would change her life forever. Jackie was active until mysterious pains wracked her entire body, eventually becoming so bad that she had to drop out of school.
| 18 | 9 | "The Man With Rocks in His Chest" | June 12, 2006 |
A baby boy suffers from the same symptoms that killed off male offspring on his mother's side of the family, Could doctors figure out what it is before it's too late? A man in his late thirties experiences a constant, painful burning sensation in his chest, making breathing difficult, but an initial trip to the ER reveals nothing. A woman lives with joint pain, redness in her eyes, and a blood test revealed an elevated anti-nuclear antibody.

=== Season 3 (2007) ===
| No. overall | No. in season | Title | Original release date |
|---|---|---|---|
| 20 | 1 | "Sleeping Beauty" | April 9, 2007 |
A girl sleeps for ten days in a row, but tests are normal and doctors are perplexed; A motivational speaker is left speechless when abdominal pain and bloody stool take over his life.
| 21 | 2 | "The Man Who Turned Orange" | April 16, 2007 |
A doctor makes an unexpected discovery when he operates on a young woman; doctors try to reach a diagnosis when a marathon runner experiences mysterious fatigue.
| 22 | 3 | "Deadly Sore Throat" | April 23, 2007 |
A man suffers from a series of debilitating symptoms; doctors cannot diagnose his illness, but thanks to a chance meeting, this mystery will be solved; a woman undergoes a risky left temporal craniotomy.
| 23 | 4 | "The 13 Year Stomach Ache" | May 14, 2007 |
A teenager is rushed to the hospital after taking aspirin to help alleviate altitude sickness; a woman has pain in her arm that mysteriously spreads.
| 24 | 5 | "The Bearded Lady" | May 21, 2007 |
A woman and her husband decide to start a family after numerous negative pregnancy tests; a man appears to suffer an embolism.
| 22 | 6 | "The Boy Who Couldn't Breathe" | August 20, 2007 |
A 3-month-old boy has breathing difficulties; a woman has stomach problems; stepping on a crochet hook causes strange problems for a patient.
| 26 | 7 | "Frenetic Genetics" | August 27, 2007 |
An infant shows diverse symptoms; an ER nurse gets a diagnosis of lymphoma, before another symptom reveals her true illness.
| 27 | 8 | "The Baby Who Changed Colors" | September 3, 2007 |
Brenda and Jake are delighted when their daughter Isabel is born, but their euphoria quickly turns to panic when Isabel stops eating and her skin turns grey. Noah and Alexis were healthy twins until they suddenly lost all their milestones. Charlie, an active pastor, has difficulty reading; doctors must act quickly to save his eyesight.

=== Season 4 (2007) ===
| No. overall | No. in season | Title | Original release date |
|---|---|---|---|
| 28 | 1 | "The Girl Who Couldn't Eat" | October 8, 2007 |
Doctors wonder why an apparently healthy baby fails to achieve its developmental goals; on the other hand, a woman who seemed to be in good health suddenly becomes ill.
| 29 | 2 | "Bizarre Visions" | October 15, 2007 |
A woman experiences chronic stomach pain and diarrhea attributed to irritable bowel syndrome; another faces extreme fatigue and night sweating while pregnant.
| 30 | 3 | "The Woman Who Craved Pickles" | October 22, 2007 |
A baby boy could not keep any food down; an X-Ray revealed that he had been born with a diaphragmatic hernia. A woman who suffers from extreme fatigue has strange cravings for pickles; when her heart nearly stops, doctors try to find the cause of her problems.
| 31 | 4 | "Donor Disaster" | December 3, 2007 |
A pregnant woman experiences stomach pains and headaches; another woman experiences eye inflammation and joint stiffness.
| 32 | 5 | "The Purple Puzzle" | December 10, 2007 |
An abnormality on the ultrasound alarms parents expecting a baby; a biology teacher has a series of strange symptoms.
| 33 | 6 | "A Case of Paralysis" | December 17, 2007 |
An aspiring actress awakens to an excruciating pain on the right side of her face; Bill experiences nausea and strange tingling in his legs; doctor visits and MRI tests show how these two different cases reveal paralysis.

=== Season 5 (2008) ===
| No. overall | No. in season | Title | Original release date |
|---|---|---|---|
| 34 | 1 | "The Girl Who Couldn't Be Touched" | January 14, 2008 |
Trisha and David Kielb's baby is born, but soon afterwards the heart stops, turning their joy into fear; a woman experiences excruciating headaches.
| 35 | 2 | "The Girl Who Gagged" | January 21, 2008 |
A woman has shortness of breath, chest and joint pain, extreme fatigue, and a cough; strange symptoms appear in an energetic kindergartener.
| 36 | 3 | "The Woman Who Kept Falling Down" | January 28, 2008 |
A baby boy has bouts of vomiting and diarrhea from the day of his birth; a young woman experiences blackouts after she hits puberty.
| 37 | 4 | "A Deadly Cough" | March 3, 2008 |
A young college student named Mary Ann Piazza is misdiagnosed with pneumonia, but her cough keeps worsening accompanied with extreme fatigue. An infant, Danielle, throws up after eating every meal, and experiences stomach protrusion.
| 38 | 5 | "The Girl Nobody Believed" | March 10, 2008 |
A husband is rendered helpless by back pain. An overweight girl experiences dizziness and shortness of breath with any physical exertion.
| 39 | 6 | "The Headache That Wouldn't Go Away" | March 17, 2008 |
Lavelle Fernandez and Roddy Palma's baby girl inexplicably turns blue 30 minutes after her birth; Laurie Scott suffers from excruciating headaches that won't go away.
| 40 | 7 | "The Sickest Patient in the Hospital" | March 24, 2008 |
A father who recently underwent an operation begins to suffer from swollen legs, insomnia, and sudden attacks of vomiting; An active woman experiences joint pain and purple urine.
| 41 | 8 | "Terrifying Tremors" | March 31, 2008 |
When Heather and Toddy bring their baby Gabby home from the hospital, a strange rash soon appears on the baby's skin and it begins to suffer frequent fevers. Jennifer's mysterious abdominal pains, vertigo and extremely heavy periods haunt her life.
| 42 | 9 | "The Woman Who Couldn't Cry" | April 7, 2008 |
Doctors can't pinpoint the cause of the array of debilitating ailments a woman has been suffering from for more than 50 years. Another woman mysteriously gains water weight and has swollen ankles.
| 43 | 10 | "The Woman With a Knife in Her Head" | April 14, 2008 |
Amanda Coveler, a woman who successfully gives birth to a second daughter after two miscarriages, faces challenges after giving birth. Anne Hummel, a successful real estate agent, suffered from constant sinus headaches.

=== Season 6 (2008–09) ===
| No. overall | No. in season | Title | Original release date |
|---|---|---|---|
| 44 | 1 | "The Woman With the Giant Lump" | November 24, 2008 |
A very active 41-year-old bodybuilder realizes that a strange lump has grown in her jaw while training for a competition; a boy has infrequent bowel movements.
| 45 | 2 | "The Woman Who Couldn't Stop Rocking" | December 1, 2008 |
A woman starts failing after a family vacation; another woman, who has suffered from stomach pains for years, has problems with swelling during menstruation.
| 46 | 3 | "The Baby Who Wouldn't Stop Crying" | December 8, 2008 |
A baby develops a mysterious set of symptoms, including a bulging forehead and eye color changes. A teen suffers severe hand pain during swim practice.
| 47 | 4 | "The Girl Who Couldn't Wake Up" | December 15, 2008 |
A young woman experiences bizarre episodes where they sleep for almost the entire day after a car accident causes them to develop Hypopituitarism. An 11-year-old suffers a terrible headache, indicative of pseudotumor cerebri
| 48 | 5 | "The Girl Who Couldn't Move" | March 2, 2009 |
A couple adopts a girl and they find a huge and swollen lump on her shoulder. Initially suspected to be severe neurofibromatosis, the efforts of doctors to relieve the child's condition by conducting an amputation of the affected arm only makes things worse when bone begins overrunning the site of the amputation, revealing her condition to be the lethal and progressive disease fibrodysplasia ossificans progressiva. A young student begins to suffer from paralyzing pain in his back caused by a pilonidal cyst. Eventually, he experiences fatigue. A routine blood test revealed that he had thrombotic thrombocytopenic purpura.
| 49 | 6 | "The Boy Who Kept Swelling" | March 9, 2009 |
A mother of two children begins to suffer a series of very debilitating headaches. An 18-month-old baby suddenly starts screaming one afternoon in the pool, and begins exhibiting extremely painful symptoms when exposed to sunlight, with porphyria later found to be the culprit.
| 50 | 7 | "The Boy Who Stopped Walking" | March 16, 2009 |
Rachele Lacount and Mike West are delighted that their baby has started to walk and talk, but suddenly they realize that something is wrong with his right eye. Since middle school, Cherryl Marshall struggled with taming her obscene body odor.
| 51 | 8 | "The Boy Who Bit Himself" | March 23, 2009 |
Parents notice their 7-month-old son has troubling physical impairments, then begins violently harming himself, culminating in a horrifying incident where the child bites off his own lower lip; he is later diagnosed with the genetic condition Lesch-Nyhan syndrome. A woman traveling the world starts experiencing unusual back pain and tingling in her feet that rapidly develops into a spreading paralysis; following the successful use of plasmapheresis, the cause of the dangerous condition is identified as Devic's disease, an inflammation of the spinal cord.
| 52 | 9 | "The Boy Who Could Break" | March 30, 2009 |
Bob was an outstanding middle school teacher who never got sick a day in his life until he was struck by night sweats, headaches, light sensitivity, and blindness in his left eye. Diane and Howard have a baby boy with a mystery illness. Eventually, another doctor sees the newborn and diagnoses a rare and fatal disease, seen less than 100 times.
| 53 | 10 | "The Black and Blue Baby" | April 6, 2009 |
Holly is overjoyed at the birth of her second baby, Hannah Hannum, but soon realizes that she has Down syndrome; Carly and Nathan have just gotten married, when Carly falls extremely ill with strong nausea.
| 54 | 11 | "The Baby Who Couldn't Stop Eating" | April 13, 2009 |
Doctors try to understand diseases that are often misdiagnosed, including a case of a newborn who has a cleft in the chest, and is later diagnosed with Marfan syndrome after they begin exhibiting the telltale signs of the condition as they grow older, and another who shows very worrying symptoms.
| 55 | 12 | "The Girl Who Fell Apart" | April 20, 2009 |
Marylyn and Randall House become alarmed when their young daughter's motor skills begin to deteriorate; Amanda Gray experiences extreme fatigue after the birth of her second daughter.
| 56 | 13 | "The Girl Who Fell To Pieces" | April 27, 2009 |
After passing out during a soccer game, Allie Isaacson suffers excruciating pain in her legs; Molly Bigford experiences a miscarriage with her first pregnancy and high blood pressure with her second.

=== Season 7 (2009) ===
| No. overall | No. in season | Title | Original release date |
|---|---|---|---|
| 56 | 1 | "The Breasts That Changed Color" | August 10, 2009 |
A woman experiences strange symptoms after breast reduction surgery; though the symptoms are initially attributed to the surgery, she is eventually diagnosed with inflammatory breast cancer. A baby has severe developmental delays, difficulty eating, and jerky movements; her unusually happy demeanor eventually leads to a diagnosis of Angelman syndrome.
| 57 | 2 | "The Woman Who Saw Pink" | August 17, 2009 |
A woman experiences numerous unusual symptoms as a result of being infected by the bacteria Serratia marcescens, including an incident where her breast milk turns pink after being dyed with a chemical produced by the bacteria. An infant begins experiencing intense pain in their hip.
| 58 | 3 | "The Girl With Holes in Her Jaw" | August 24, 2009 |
Over the first several years of their life, a young girl experiences bouts of debilitating pain and degradation to her bones caused by lymphangiomatosis.
| 59 | 4 | "The Woman Who Went Crazy" | August 31, 2009 |
A young mother begins to have panic attacks and has a seizure; she experiences episodes of paranoia and delusions after being released from the hospital, which later escalate to outbreaks of intense violence after she is admitted once again. The cause is later found to be a teratoma and the body's attempts to get rid of it with an immune response, inadvertently targeting the brain in the form of Anti-NMDA receptor encephalitis. A truck driver and father of two had been caught off guard by mysterious pains in his feet. Later, he was experiencing temperature changes and the pain increased to the point where he had to quit his job. All hope was lost until a vascular specialist diagnosed him with Buerger’s disease on account of his heavy smoking.
| 60 | 5 | "The Woman Who Couldn't Stop Burping" | September 7, 2009 |
For years, Mary has had a problem with constant belching; now having difficulty breathing, she is seen by gastroenterologist Dr Chey, who discovers something he has never seen before and diagnoses her with Congenital diaphragmatic hernia. Pam was an excellent ER nurse who seemed to have a good handle on her health, until she was struck with headaches, unequal pupils, and facial numbness; When cardiologist Dr Yadav saw her angiogram, he diagnosed her with Fibromuscular dysplasia
| 61 | 6 | "The Boy Who Never Cried" | November 16, 2009 |
A couple fear for their child when they discover that he does not cry when he is in pain (he is eventually diagnosed with congenital insensitivity to pain with anhidrosis); a woman in her thirties suffers inexplicable seizures.
| 62 | 7 | "The Girl With Half a Face" | November 23, 2009 |
Nicole is a teenager who feels excruciating pain in her jaw and her face starts to sink, with her affliction later found to be the result of Parry-Romberg syndrome. Kevin thinks he has food poisoning, but he starts to lose motor coordination.
| 63 | 8 | "The Girl Who Stopped Growing" | November 30, 2009 |
Baby Samantha has surgery to remove congenital cataracts that could lead to blindness; as the months pass, Samantha is unable to roll, crawl or talk, and her head is unusually small for her age; her parents seek help. When her newborn brother begins exhibiting the same symptoms, a genetic test finds that the two children are sufferers of Cockayne syndrome, a genetic disorder which causes premature aging. Eileen was considered the loud soccer mom, from cheering on her daughter to being the top sales person. That was until she woke up with a raspy voice that gradually lasted all day long. Dismissed by her family and doctors, she had to prove that her symptoms were real. A laryngologist diagnosed her with Spasmodic Dysphonia.

=== Season 8 (2010) ===
| No. overall | No. in season | Title | Original release date |
|---|---|---|---|
| 64 | 1 | "The Woman Whose Legs Turned Black" | March 8, 2010 |
Diane finds two small, red bumps on her foot; within hours her foot is swollen and appears black and blue; despite undergoing tests, the medical team has no diagnosis.
| 65 | 2 | "The Man Who Tripled in Size" | March 15, 2010 |
Walt has always been in good health until one day he suddenly faints; when he arrives at hospital, his blood pressure is very low and he has gained 100 lb (45 kg) of weight in water. It is eventually discovered that he is suffering from systemic capillary leak syndrome.
| 66 | 3 | "The Boy Who Couldn't Stop Eating" | March 22, 2010 |
After blisters appear all over the body of young Julie McCawley, she appears to have Stevens-Johnson syndrome; Conor Heybach's weight gain and uncontrollable appetite is a mystery until a doctor discovers he has Prader-Willi syndrome.
| 67 | 4 | "The Girl Whose Skin Came Off" | March 29, 2010 |
A college student's body is covered in blisters and her colleagues fear it will be contagious; a nurse has paralyzing back spasms and may lose her job.
| 68 | 5 | "The Girl Who Was Covered in Bumps" | April 5, 2010 |
A woman feels uncontrollable pain in her menstrual period; a girl tries to lead a normal life, despite being covered by tumors.
| 69 | 6 | "The Baby Who Smelled Like Pancakes" | April 12, 2010 |
Carole, a 65-year-old woman, has a hard time walking in a straight line; Sonya and Sherwood are delighted with their second daughter, but they begin to worry when the baby does not stop crying. When a particularly unusual symptom emerges, followed by uncontrollable seizures, it is discovered that the infant is affected by maple syrup urine disease.

=== Season 9 (2010) ===
| No. overall | No. in season | Title | Original release date |
|---|---|---|---|
| 70 | 1 | "The Woman Whose Flesh Was Eaten Alive" | June 7, 2010 |
June has a biopsy and, when a mark appears on the site, she has surgery, leaving her with a growing open wound. Her doctor diagnoses her with a flesh eating virus. Can June's life be saved?
| 71 | 2 | "The Boy Who Only Hopped" | June 14, 2010 |
After moving houses, and months of strange behavior, 12-year-old Sammy stops walking and only hops; the doctors are the only hope to discover the cause of his bizarre symptoms. He is eventually diagnosed with PANDAS, a condition in which antibodies mistake his brain for Streptococcus bacteria.
| 72 | 3 | "The Man With Hundreds of Lumps" | June 21, 2010 |
Jessica is stricken with fevers and crippling migraines, and after Jake starts a military training program he finds hundreds of painful, fatty lumps appearing on his body.
| 73 | 4 | "The Baby Who Bruised Easily" | August 9, 2010 |
A baby continuously gets bruises and spots all over her body, and even the smallest cuts cause her to lose shocking amounts of blood. Genetic tests reveal that the infant has the rare coagulopathy Glanzmann's thrombasthenia, a recessive genetic condition which prevents platelets from forming blood clots.
| 74 | 5 | "The Girl With No Bowel" | August 16, 2010 |
After suffering a series of debilitating incidents believed to be the result of Crohn's disease, Karen, an albino, has to have most of her colon removed. Several decades later, at the age of 38, she receives a phone call from someone who suggests she is suffering from a rare and fatal disease, Hermansky-Pudlak syndrome, which is also the cause of her albinism.
| 75 | 6 | "The Man Covered in Boils" | August 23, 2010 |
Lonnie's dreams of playing in the NFL are destroyed when boils develop on his head as a symptom of the painful skin condition hidradenitis suppurativa. Theresa suffers sight loss during her pregnancy; physicians struggle to find a diagnosis.
| 76 | 7 | "The Toddler That Went Through Puberty" | August 30, 2010 |
A three-year-old's unexplained vaginal bleeding sends her parents searching for answers to help their baby girl (she is eventually diagnosed with McCune-Albright syndrome). Also, a student plagued by cramps is unable to hold her food down.
| 77 | 8 | "The Toddler That Stopped Walking" | September 6, 2010 |
A mother rushes her toddler to hospital when she loses the ability to walk or stand. Plus, a runner tries to sleep off a numbness in his foot, but finds the sensation spreading.
| 78 | 9 | "The Woman With Unusual DNA" | September 20, 2010 |
When Jeanne fails to hit puberty, doctors discover that something truly bizarre is the cause; analysis of her DNA finds that she is genetically male, possessing Y chromosomes, but due to the rare genetic disorder Swyer syndrome, she appears outwardly female. Mary is stricken with a collapsed lung and breathing problems.
| 79 | 10 | "The Boy With the 150 Lb Leg" | October 4, 2010 |
By the time Adrian is in high school his right leg weighs 150 lb (68 kg) and limits his mobility. Kathy is struggling to treat a rash and is experiencing weight loss. Can doctors help? Featuring Klippel-Trénaunay syndrome, and Glucagonoma

=== Season 10 (2011) ===
| No. overall | No. in season | Title | Original release date |
|---|---|---|---|
| 80 | 1 | "Fight to the Last Breath" | January 5, 2011 |
A man tries to ease his wife's sinus pains, while a woman faces her own mortality when she experiences a series of debilitating symptoms.
| 81 | 2 | "Trapped Inside Their Bodies" | January 12, 2011 |
A young man has strange growths; toddler rapidly gains weight.
| 82 | 3 | "Dangerous Growths" | January 19, 2011 |
A woman starts growing uncontrollably. A boy coughs up raspberry-like growths.
| 83 | 4 | "When the Body Shuts Down" | January 26, 2011 |
When Kylie is born struggling to breathe, doctors aren't sure whether they will find a cure. Also, athlete Michael is left fighting for his life when a sore throat turns deadly.
| 84 | 5 | "A Family's Desperate Search" | February 2, 2011 |
Since birth, Ricky is plagued by respiratory infections and a bizarre inability to grow. Noel is a healthy, active man until mysterious spasms start taking over his life.
| 85 | 6 | "Time Is Running Out" | June 1, 2011 |
A 14-year-old develops a rash that leaves her fighting for her life; a young father's body begins to shut down.
| 86 | 7 | "Too Young to Be Sick" | June 8, 2011 |
Harry's body starts to undergo a mysterious transformation. Sadie finds herself on the brink of starvation after her doctor dismisses her complaints.
| 87 | 8 | "A Search for Answers" | June 15, 2011 |
A girl is born with shocking deformities; a college student suffers from fluid around his heart and lungs.
| 88 | 9 | "Stolen Senses" | June 22, 2011 |
A viral infection paralyzes Tammy from the chest down. Nadine's world is disappearing before her eyes as an unknown condition slowly steals her eyesight.
| 89 | 10 | "Simple Symptoms Turn Threatening" | June 29, 2011 |
Weak muscles make walking and using hands difficult; bump on the finger could be the first sign of a deadly infection.
