= A Dating Story =

A Dating Story is a Pie Town Productions, Banyan Productions, American-centric television show that featured a real-life matchmaker selecting two people whom the matchmaker always wanted to "fix up." The program then followed the new couple's pre-date preparations as well as the blind date itself. In June 2003, 8 episodes were filmed in Chicago.

A Dating Story was created to complement the shows A Wedding Story, A Baby Story, and A Makeover Story on The Learning Channel (TLC) and Discovery Channel. The show is no longer in production.
