= Namaste Yoga =

- Genre: Fitness
- Created by: Tim McCauley
- Written by: Kate Potter, Erica Blitz
- Directed by: Howard Dancyger, Ian Kerr
- Narrated by: Kate Potter, Erica Blitz
- Composer: Tim McCauley
- Country of origin: Canada
- Original language: English
- No. of seasons: 4
- No. of episodes: 52

Production
- Executive producers: Michael Chechik; Gabriela Schonbach
- Production location: Vancouver
- Cinematography: Ian Kerr, CSC
- Running time: 30 minutes
- Production company: Omnifilm Entertainment

Namaste Yoga is an instructional yoga as exercise television series produced by Namaste TV, a division of Omnifilm Entertainment, headquartered in Vancouver. In 2021, the company launched an online fitness platform and app called Movement by NM where Namaste Yoga episodes are available for streaming.

== About ==
An original Canadian production, Namaste Yoga premiered April 1, 2005, on ACCESS and Canadian Learning Television in Canada and debuted April 23, 2005, on HDnet and June 28, 2006, on FitTV in the United States. The show aired in Canada on ONE: The Mind and Body Channel and has been broadcast internationally in France, Portugal, Spain, Scandinavia, Latin America, Central and South Asia, the Middle East, India and the United States. Seasons 3 and 4, narrated and choreographed by yoga instructor Erica Blitz, were released in 2014. Seasons 1 and 2, narrated and choreographed by yoga instructor Kate Potter, were released in 2005. Each episode of Namaste Yoga teaches a unique Hatha Vinyasa style movement sequence.

== Series overview ==
Season	Episodes	Release date
1	13	2005
2	13	2005
Namaste: The Five Elements	4	2010
3	13	2014
4	13	2014

== Episodes ==
=== Season 1 ===
- 101: "Exalted Warrior" – Exalted Warrior sequence is a standing series focused on moving through various warrior and triangle poses. Invigorating and strengthening, this series focuses on reaching up and reaching out.
- 102: "Sun Moon" – To balance the energy of right and left sides of the body, Sun Moon sequence blends strengthening postures with balancing poses to create equilibrium throughout the body and mind. This series also provides an excellent hamstring and hip flexor stretch.
- 103: "Firebird" – Firebird starts out as a standing sequence and moves to the floor in a dynamic yet gentle flow. The emphasis is on increasing flexibility in the spine and hips.
- 104: "Gate Opening" – Gate Opening sequence creates a graceful flow using both strength and balance. In this uplifting practice, you will increase upper body strength and flexibility of the shoulders.
- 105: "Dancing Sun" – Dancing Sun stimulates energy flow throughout the entire body and is a beautiful presentation of some the classic standing poses. Focus on lengthening all points of the body.
- 106: "Half Moon" – Half Moon is a challenging sequence with a combination of warrior poses and half moon balancing. Working with balance poses increases overall coordination and strength while informing physical grace.
- 107: "Earth" – Earth sequence begins kneeling and continues with floor poses that are both gentle and invigorating. This slow, gentle series builds core strength and spinal flexibility.
- 108: "Lotus Link" – Lotus begins as a standing series and moves gracefully through seated poses returning again to the standing Lotus and completion of the cycle.
- 109: "Water Light" – Water Light is a smooth, flowing practice that will open your hips, increase flexibility in the spine, back and shoulders, and stretch the hamstrings.
- 110: "Revolved Triangle" – This challenging sequence requires concentration, physical strength and balance. Revolved Triangle is a great practice to test the balance points of your unique constitution and explore all the angles of the body.
- 111: "Head to Knee" – Head to Knee Sequence is the perfect yoga practice for distance runners. This sequence helps to relieve tension in the hips and calves and hamstrings. Standing poses are woven together with calming breath and deep stretches.
- 112: "Crane" – Crane is one of the most challenging sequences in the Namaste Yoga series. Both the standing and arm balances are to be practiced and learned slowly. Progress and not perfection is the goal with Crane.
- 113: "Riding the Wind" – Riding the Wind is a very dynamic series that once learned is exhilarating and grounding at the same time. This sequence is great for strengthening the legs and abdominal muscles, adjusting your posture and fine-tuning your balance.

=== Season 2 ===
- 201: "Sunbird" – Sunbird sequence wakes up the spine, and energizes the limbs. With cat roll, sunbird and dog poses, this energy freeing series allows you to move completely through the spine and practice asymmetrical balances.
- 202: "Heart Opening" – Heart Opening sequence stimulates the flow of energy from the core to the limbs by moving through classic standing posture in a gentle manner. This series explores balance while also strengthening and improving flexibility of the hips, legs and spine.
- 203: "Triangle" – Triangle sequence is not easy to do perfectly, but it will give great benefit to those who give it an honest effort. The emphasis is on lengthening the spine, as the hamstrings are stretched, and strengthening the knees while the hips are loosened.
- 204: "Warrior" – The Warrior series encourages confidence, relieves sluggishness and brings mindful awareness of balance.
- 205: "Sun Wind" – Sun Wind sequence is both challenging and encouraging. With leg extensions and chest lifts to generate heat in the body, moving with grace through this flow will encourage flexibility while strengthening the legs, shoulders and abdominal muscles.
- 206: "Seated Twist" – With a slower pace that is excellent for deep, full breathing, Seated Twist sequence is a workout for the mind and lungs. This rejuvenating and restorative floor series features hip openers and spinal rolling.
- 207: "Extended Leg Balancing" – Mixing easy standing poses with difficult balances, the Extended Leg Balance sequence challenges the practitioner to maintain integrity of breath from start to finish.
- 208: "Swan" – The postures in Swan Sequence flow together with elegance and include all the spinal curves of Cat and Swan rolling, to the deep hip flexor stretches of Pigeon and One Legged Down Dog.
- 209: "Third Eye" – Third Eye sequence is a challenging series that features postures that stay close to the floor with plenty of hip openers and leg stretches.
- 210: "Heart Mind" – Heart Mind Sequence will test shoulder and leg flexibility while improving core strength. This series includes both Sunbird Bow and One Legged Down Dog.
- 211: "Lord of the Fishes" – Lord of the Fishes sequence begins standing and quickly moves to the floor to deeply stretch the spine, shoulders and hips. By exploring standing, seated and prone postures, this sequence allows the practitioner to be invigorated by continual change.
- 212: "Dove" – Using balances, twists and side bends, Dove sequence aims to tone the waistline while increasing flexibility in the back and hips. A challenging flow that draws the practitioner to pay close attention to the body's alignment and placement in each pose.
- 213: "Dancing Shiva" – Dancing Shiva is one of the most challenging of all the Namaste Yoga sequences. A rigorous workout for the whole body, this flow will test strength, balance and good humour.

=== Season 3 ===
- 301: "Soften the Edges" – Soften the Edges is a sequence that encourages a sense of ease in both body and breath while moving through a dynamic series of confident poses. Tap into a quality of inner peace and learn to return to that feeling whenever you are most challenged, on and off the mat.
- 302: "Align Your Axis" – Detoxify your whole body with this cleansing sequence. Learn to be softer on the outside, as you awaken the power of your core. Align Your Axis provides an opportunity to wring out any unwanted emotions, and let go of any thoughts or ideas that cloud your perspective.
- 303: "Warrior Wisdom" – With a steady focus on the breath, Warrior Wisdom cultivates presence that is attentive, aware and complete. Moving slowly with the breath allows a deeper connection of mind and body that will leave you with greater clarity, confidence and strength.
- 304: "Release and Restore" – Release and Restore is a sequence that brings you full circle through a series of poses that create space for reflection. You will release tension in your spine while attuning to the changes even the smallest actions create. What change will you make today?
- 305: "Create Your Calm" – Cultivate a sense of peace and stability with the Create Your Calm sequence. This balancing flow allows for a deeper connection to the earth and its grounding energy. Feel the presence of your inner strength, and welcome a softer awareness with this gentle practice.
- 306: "Reflect and Connect" – Encourage movement from a thoughtful, more centered place with the Reflect and Connect sequence. Engage your whole body with a grounding series of poses that calm and center the mind while releasing tension from shoulders, hips and hamstrings.
- 307: "Balance and Bend" – Stand tall and find your truest state of focus and center with this balancing flow. Use the breath to align your posture and learn to experience your practice, rather than thinking it through. Let go of your mind and connect with the asanas, or physical yoga poses.
- 308: "Bhakti Flow" – Bhakti Flow calls for an expansion of your entire being through the practice of bhakti, devotion. A practice of balance and strength that will call attention to the places in the body where tension hides, Learn to be spacious with your breath, encourage a deeper connection with your center, and move forward with purest intent
- 309: "Open and Ground" – A dynamic sequence for your upper body, Open and Ground will work your torso with a series of heart opening poses. By keeping a steady connection to the earth and lifting and opening the chest, the experience of feeling grounded while moving energy up and outward can be more fully explored.
- 310: "Stabilize and Center" – Stabilize and Center allows for the creation of a deeper connection with your core, as well as the present moment. Through the practice of conscious breathing, movement and attention to the postures, a state of centered awareness can be cultivated.
- 311: "Prana Flow" – This vinyasa flow pulses between moments of stillness and dynamic movement with every breath. Prana Flow calls for a constant presence of mind and steadiness of breath. Through this moving meditation, you will explore how the stability and consistency of breath offers you freedom of spirit.
- 312: "Grace and Gratitude" – A joyous and elegant sequence, Grace and Gratitude opens your front body with a series of dynamic backbends. Shine the light of your heart by learning to be spacious with your breath. This practice encourages action stirred from intentions of love, forgiveness, and gratitude.
- 313: "Reconnect and Refine" Connect with the essence of your being with Reconnect and Refine. This exhilarating sequence encourages you to find comfort in the present moment, and let go of preconceived expectations or agendas. It is not about where you are going, but where you are.

=== Season 4 ===
- 401: "Strengthen and Surrender: Lower Body Balance for Hips and Hamstrings" – A foundational and strengthening practice for the core and lower body, this sequence aims to cultivate space, stillness and stability.
- 402: "Anahata Flow: Open Hips, Shoulders and Heart" – Anahata Flow is a moving meditation that allows the body to seek the freedom of the sky while unifying with the breath.
- 403: "Recharge and Revitalize: Hip and Shoulder Opening" – Allow your breath to be bigger than the movements of your body in this invigorating sequence.
- 404: "Core Connection: Strengthen Your Center to Cultivate Core and Balance" – A bold sequence, Core Connection uses confident poses to help you learn to embrace your inner strength and let go of any tensions you might encounter.
- 405: "The Power of One: Hip Opening and Hand Balancing" – It's time to play! Explore the balance points of your hands. A dynamic practice, this thread of poses encourages you to find balance between ease and effort, while bringing curiosity to your response to every posture.
- 406: "Strong, Slow and Steady: Hand Balancing and Hip Opening" – Arrive at your practice, prepared to find comfort in your own abilities.
- 407: "Home is at Heart: Open and Strengthen Your Shoulders" – A mesmerizing sequence, Heart Flow encourages you to feel, rather than force your way through the poses.
- 408: "Awaken Shakti: Strengthen Your Legs and Open Your Hips" – Leave all expectations behind as you move through this enlightening sequence.
- 409: "Twist to Reveal: Balancing Twists" – Strengthen and detoxify with this powerful and challenging sequence.
- 410: "Expand and Empower: Open Your Chest, Shoulders and Hips" – Enjoy this strengthening sequence while taking the opportunity provided by the Expand and Empower practice to observe your alignment.
- 411: "Root to Rise: Balance, Twist, Hamstrings" – Learn to stay open, no matter what happens, with the Root to Rise sequence.
- 412: "Revolve to Evolve: Twists, Balance and Hamstrings" – A challenging and strengthening sequence, Revolve to Evolve seeks to reveal moments of relaxation in which truths can be more readily accessed.
- 413: "Balanced Being: Open Your Hips and Strengthen Your Arms/Upper Back" – Balanced Being is a powerful, flowing sequence set to create presence and strength. Use this practice to root down, then rise up with confidence and an incredibly centered and balanced energy. It is not about where you are going, but where you are.

== Namaste: The Five Elements ==
"Namaste: The Five Elements" is an extended Namaste Yoga episode that incorporates the teachings of Ayurveda while maintaining the same format as the original Namaste Yoga series. This episode premiered in Canada on November 23, 2010, on ONE: The Mind and Body Channell and was released on DVD on December 6, 2010, with additional features including breathing practices and slow motion yoga practice tips. In addition to designing and narrating the sequences, Kate Potter also demonstrates the poses in this session.
