= Discover Magazine (TV series) =

American television documentary series

Discover Magazine is a 1992–2000 documentary television series that aired on the Disney Channel from 1992 to 1994 and then on Discovery Channel from 1996 to 2000. The series is named after the magazine of the same name, Discover Magazine. The Disney Channel series was narrated by actor Joseph Campanella. Discovery Channel series was hosted by Peter DeMeo from 1996 to 1998. The series was nominated for an Emmy Award for "Outstanding Informational Series" in 1996, 1997 for "Outstanding Non-Fiction Series", and one other time

== Overview ==
The series was created by producer-director Les Guthman at the Walt Disney Company in 1991, after Guthman licensed the television rights to Discover Magazine from Family Media in 1990. (Disney subsequently bought Discover Magazine in 1991.) Guthman produced the series for two seasons on The Disney Channel, 1992–1994, and then working with Disney President and CEO Frank Wells sold the series to Discovery Communications in late 1994, after The Disney Channel abandoned its family-adult prime time schedule.

== Episodes ==
=== On Discovery Channel ===
(in alphabetical order; there may be others)

- "A Monster's Tale": Komodo dragons in Indonesia
- "Avalanche: Bracing for Disaster"
- "Bones": Dinosaur fossils
- "Cops and Robbers": Crime-fighting technology
- "Crime Lab": Crime-solving techniques; Pan Am Flight 103; World Trade Center bombing
- "Catastrophes" : MGM Grand fire, Titanic
- "Engineering Secrets"
- "Fear": Soldiers are trained to overcome fear, exposure to prolonged fear causes brain damage in humans, Walt Disney World's Tower of Terror ride; features Martin Samuels (Chief of Neurology at Brigham and Women's Hospital), neuroscientist Joseph E. LeDoux, Roger Pitman, Michael Davis, Larry Cahill; produced by Big Rock Productions.
- "Forensic Detectives": One of the most shocking crimes of the 19th century has a new twist.
- "Ghost Ships of Pisa": Roman ships in Pisa, Italy
- "Hidden Temples": People continue to find temples of the ancient Khmer empire.
- "Hidden Worlds": Mammoth Cave in Kentucky; underground sewage tunnels.
- "Imagining the Devil"
- "Immortality"
- "Inside an Earthquake"
- "Internet Safety Spot" Episode Notes: This Episode has the Callistos hosting and this episode is Produced by Banyan Productions.
- "Islands of Mystery"
- "Lost in Time"
- "Mummies"
- "Mummies of the Philippines"
- "Nature's Greatest Hits"
- "Science Detectives"
- "Secrets of the Samurai"
- "Speed": Physical limitations of race horses; mechanics of drag racers; fast airplanes; slowing down atoms.
- "The Body Electric"
- "The Last Neanderthals": Neanderthals disappear without a trace.
- "The Mysteries of Jade"
- "The New Alcatraz"
- "The Next Plague": How Malaysia struggled to contain the deadly Pinna Virus affecting pigs.
- "The Pioneers of Flight"
- "Uranium Cops"
- "Who Were the First Americans?"

=== On Disney Channel ===
- "The Ten Great Unanswered Questions of Science"
- "Ants, with Edward O. Wilson"
- "First Humans, with Jared Diamond"
- "Dinosaur Heresies, with Bob Bakker"
- "Keck Telescope"
- "Magellan Explores Venus"
- "Super Computer Graphics"
- "The Prehistoric Origins of Art"
- "Solar Aquatics"
- "Ocean Drifters: Charting the Currents"
- "DNA and Disease"
