= Champions of the Wild =

- Genre: Documentary
- Narrated by: Andrew Gardner

Production
- Production company: Omnifilm Entertainment

Original release
- Network: Discovery Channel
- Release: 1998 – 2003

Champions of the Wild is a documentary about animals and the effort to protect them and their habitat. The show aired on Discovery Channel in 1998 and 2003, and was narrated by Andrew Gardner. The series was initially co-produced by Omni Film Productions and the National Film Board of Canada.

== Episodes ==
- Manatee
- Bengal tiger
- Siberian tiger
- Spotted hyena
- Crocodile (Cuban crocodile)
- Uganda kob
- Wildebeest
- Hippopotamus
- Cheetah
- Elephant
- Octopus
- Bonobo
- Sea horse
- Chimpanzee
- Gibbon
- Howler monkey, capuchin monkey, spider monkey
- Tarantula
- Lion
- Kenya Wildlife vet
- Nyzinga Game reserve
- African wild dog
- Grévy's zebra
- Caribou
- Elk
- Wolverine
- Moose
- Przewalski's horse
- Mountain lion
- Bighorn sheep
- Canada lynx
- Giraffe
- American badger
