= Makeover =

Radical change in appearance

A makeover is a radical change in appearance. When the word is used to describe a change in human physical appearance, it may imply a change in clothing, haircut, or cosmetics. A personal makeover might also include weight loss, plastic surgery, dental veneers, or contact lenses. Sometimes a makeover is used to refer to non-physical things, such as a makeover of character, personality or attitude. It can also refer to a dramatic change in construction, such as when a building is renovated or is refurbished. Makeovers are usually referred to in a positive manner, as a way to start fresh or improve your life.

== In media ==
=== Television ===
Makeovers are often popular television subjects. Long a staple subject of daytime talk shows, they have recently moved into the limelight in television shows such as Queer Eye. Other popular makeover shows include What Not to Wear, How to Look Good Naked, Plain Jane, Extreme Makeover, MADE, Ambush Makeover and Pimp My Ride. There is also a category of reality TV based on giving makeovers to homes, such as Extreme Makeover: Home Edition, 60 Minute Makeover and Property Brothers.

See makeover reality television series.

Computer software and online tools can also be used for performing what are known as virtual makeovers. Using a photograph of a human face, software can apply cosmetics, hairstyles, and various eyewear such as contact lenses and sunglasses in order to allow users to visualize different looks without physically trying them on. Today, virtual makeup works in real-time using phone camera tracking, and examples are Visage Technologies's MakeApp, L'Oréal's Makeup Genius, and Oriflame's Makeup Wizard.

=== Film ===
In film there is a trope of a character, usually a girl, undergoing a dramatic makeover in appearance or personality. Some examples include:

- Now, Voyager (1942)
- Cinderella (1950)
- My Fair Lady (1964)
- Grease (1978)
- The Breakfast Club (1985)
- Desperately Seeking Susan (1985)
- Moonstruck (1987)
- Clueless (1995)
- She's All That (1999)
- Miss Congeniality (2000)
- The Princess Diaries (2001)
- Mean Girls (2004)
- The Devil Wears Prada (2006)
- The House Bunny (2008)

=== Books ===
There is also a series of books, aimed at teenage girls, called The Makeover Series, written by Suzanne Weyn. There are several experts who perform the art of makeovers. Usually makeover artists specialize in hair styling, make-up or clothing.

"The Makeover Guy" is a registered trademark for author and makeover expert Christopher Hopkins who is known for his television head-to-toe makeovers. He has a book called Staging Your Comeback: A Complete Beauty Revival for Women Over 45.

== See also ==
- Pygmalion (play)
- Don't Make Me Over (song)
