= Runway Moms =

American reality television program

- Country of origin: United States
- Original language: English
- No. of seasons: 2

Production
- Executive producer: Steven Engel
- Production company: Engel Entertainment

Original release
- Network: Discovery Health Channel
- Release: January 2, 2006

Runway Moms is an American reality television program created for the Discovery Health Channel. It is a documentary style show profiling women that work for Expecting Models, a modeling agency that specializes in pregnant models and actresses.

Each episode highlights a different model mom-to-be and her unique pregnancy and birth story. The models are followed on their photo shoots and share their prenatal secrets to staying fit and glamorous. Agency owner Liza Elliott-Ramirez, mother of two, acts as both an agent and confidant for the models.

Runway Moms was broadcast on the Discovery Health Channel in the United States, the Discovery Channel in Australia, and on Discovery Home & Health in southeast Asia.
