= Kim Jones (digital creative) =

Australian digital creative and fashion influencer on social media

Kim Jones-Rosales
- Born: Kimberly Camilla Jones; 4 August 1987 (age 39); United Kingdom
- Occupation: Fashion influencer
- Spouse: Jericho Rosales (m. 2014; sep. 2019)
- Modelling information
- Height: 170 cm (5 ft 7 in)
- Hair colour: Dark brown
- Eye colour: Hazel
- Website: http://www.kimcamjones.com

Kimberly Camilla Jones (born 4 August 1987) is a British-born Australian digital creative and fashion influencer on social media. She is also a blogger, stylist, designer and photographer. Her website Miss Jones is an online platform of editorials featuring fashion, travel and lifestyle.

== Early life ==
Jones was born in the United Kingdom on 4 August 1987, but spent most of her life in Australia.

== Professional career ==
Jones began her career as a model when she moved to the Philippines in 2010. She started her fashion website in 2011. Jones has worked with Christian Dior, Louis Vuitton, Tommy Hilfiger, IWC Schaffhausen and Shoes of Prey. In 2016, Jones designed and launched a five-piece capsule shoe collection with US-based label Shoes of Prey.

Her television credits include a short stint as TV presenter on ETC's Etcetera and a guest appearance on Asia's Next Top Model.

Jones has appeared on the cover of a number of fashion magazines including Rogue, L'Officiel Manila, L'Officiel Singapore and Preview and been featured in Coveteur.

== Personal life ==
Jones married actor Jericho Rosales on 1 May 2014 in Boracay, Philippines.

Jones and Rosales announced their separation on 29 January 2024, after 10 years of marriage; they had lived separately since 2019.
