= List of programs broadcast by SolarFlix =

This is a list of programs broadcast by SolarFlix, a Philippine free-to-air television network owned by Solar Entertainment Corporation through its subsidiary Southern Broadcasting Network. Its programming includes Turkish dramas, Latin American telenovelas, classic Filipino movies and independent Filipino films, and Hollywood and foreign acquired movies.

== Current programming ==
=== Film presentation ===
- Late Night Delight (2022; Tagalog classic movies)
- Pinoy Mega Hits (2022; Tagalog classic movies)
- Reel Time (2022; Hollywood and foreign acquired movies)
- Sine Siesta (2022; Tagalog classic movies)
- Weekend Sine Nights (2022; Tagalog independent movies, shorts and documentaries)

=== Lifestyle ===
- Etcetera (Season 5 only, re-run) (2022)
- The Peep Show (re-run) (2022)
- In Her Shoes (re-run) (2022, 2023)
- Stylized (re-run) (2023)

=== Infomercials ===
- E-Novation TV (2026)

=== Religious ===
- Oras ng Himala (2003–2007, 2023)
- The Word Exposed (2022)

=== Drama ===
- Forbidden Fruit (2023)
- My Sweet Lie (2022)
- The Secret of Feriha (2024)
- The Legend of Bruce Lee (2024)
