= Garth Davis (surgeon) =

American bariatric surgeon

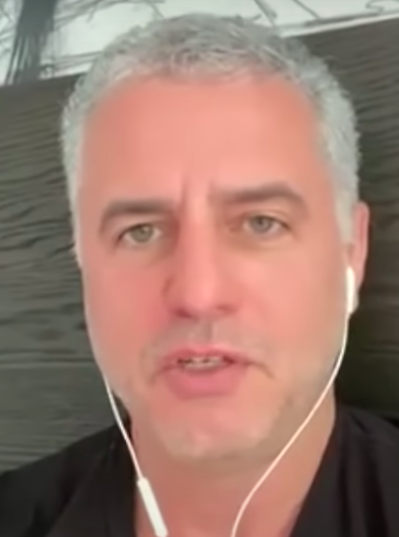
- Garth Davis in 2020
- Born: January 28, 1970 (age 56); Johannesburg
- Occupations: Surgeon, writer

Garth Philip Davis (born January 28, 1970) is an American bariatric surgeon, physician, and author. Davis specializes in weight management and is known for his advocacy of plant-based nutrition.

== Biography ==
Davis was born in South Africa and moved to the United States as a child. He graduated Phi Beta Kappa from the University of Texas at Austin and from Baylor College of Medicine with high honors. Davis completed his surgical residency at the University of Michigan where he was elected to the position of Chief Administrative Resident.

Davis was the medical director of the Davis Clinic in Houston, Texas, and was the medical director for bariatric surgery at the Memorial Hermann Memorial City Hospital. He went on to be the medical director of the weight management center at Mission Hospital in Asheville, North Carolina.

Davis is a board-certified surgeon who specializes in bariatric surgery and Medical Weight Loss at Mission Weight Management Center in Asheville, North Carolina.He is now back in Houston, Texas, working for Houston Methodist and Methodist West, and is serving as the medical director for the Comprehensive Metabolic Disease Management Center.

Davis is certified by the American Board of Surgery and is a fellow of the American College of Surgeons and the American Society for Metabolic and Bariatric Surgery and the American Board of Obesity Medicine.

In 2007, Davis and his father Robert Davis were featured on the reality television show Big Medicine which contained footage from their bariatric surgery practice.

Davis is a vegan in his personal life and supports animal rights.

== Media work ==
Davis has gained media recognition for helping several people, including a celebrity, lose hundreds of pounds by using bariatric surgery in combination with lifestyle changes. One person became a triathlete.

Davis has partnered with Memorial Hermann Memorial City Medical Center and Rawfully Organic Co-Op to open Houston's first hospital-based organic produce stand. They have launched a "Farmacy" program with specialized prescription pads for this purpose. Patients are prescribed fruits and vegetables.

== Use of identity by scammers ==
Davis's photograph has been used in a tag team money transfer scam, including forged documents and multiple scammers impersonating authorities. One victim involved lost her entire life savings to a romance scammer using Davis's photograph, under the alias "Frank Harrison". Garth Davis made a Facebook post in 2021 warning of fake Instagram accounts that have been using his image, stating "I am not on any dating sites. And I do not need you to send me money. Lots of people stealing pics and making fake accounts."

== Proteinaholic ==
Davis is best known for his book Proteinaholic: How Our Obsession with Meat Is Killing Us and What We Can Do About It, which argues that a high-protein diet of animal source foods causes people to be overweight and more susceptible to certain diseases, such as cancer and diabetes. Davis states that people can get all the protein they need from a plant-based diet. Davis has written that there is "a broad consensus that including plants and limiting animals in our diets is the single best thing we can do for our health".

== Selected publications ==
=== Journal publications ===
- Chang VC, Pan P, Shah SK, Srinivasan A, Haberl E, Wan C, Kajese TM, Primomo JA, Davis G. "Routine preoperative endoscopy in patients undergoing bariatric surgery." Surg Obes Relat Dis. 2020 Jun;16(6):745-750.
- Primomo JA, Kajese T, Davis G, Davis R, Shah S, Orsak M, Morrison C. "Decreased access to bariatric care: an analysis of referral practices to bariatric specialists. " Surg Obes Relat Dis. 2016 Nov;12(9):1725-1730.
- Davis R, Davis GP. "Ensuring safe passage of the OrVil anvil utilizing a corkscrew maneuver." Surg Obes Relat Dis. 2013 Mar-Apr;9(2):329-30.
- Scheffer C, Blanckenberg M, Garth-Davis B, Eisenberg M. "Biomedical engineering education through global engineering teams." Annu Int Conf IEEE Eng Med Biol Soc. 2012;2012:5058-61.
- Davis G, Patel JA, Gagne DJ. "Pulmonary considerations in obesity and the bariatric surgical patient." Med Clin North Am. 2007 May;91(3):433-42

=== Books ===
- The Expert's Guide to Weight-Loss Surgery (Penguin Random House, 2010)
- Proteinaholic: How Our Obsession With Meat Is Killing Us and What We Can Do About It (HarperCollins, 2016)

== See also ==
- List of animal rights advocates
- List of vegans
