= Banyan Productions =

American TV production company based in Philadelphia

- Company type: Private
- Industry: Television production
- Founded: 1992
- Founders: Susan Cohen-Dickler; Jan Dickler; Ray Murray
- Headquarters: Philadelphia, Pennsylvania, U.S.
- Products: Television programs
- Services: TV production
- Website: www.banyan.com

Banyan Productions is a production company located in Philadelphia, Pennsylvania, United States. Clients include Discovery Channel, the Food Network, Fox, HGTV, Lifetime, NBC, Nickelodeon/Nick at Nite, TLC, and the Travel Channel. Banyan Productions was founded in 1992 by Susan Cohen-Dickler, Jan Dickler and Ray Murray, the former host of Evening Magazine on KYW-TV 3 in Philadelphia.

== TV shows ==
- A Dating Story (2000-2004)
- A Makeover Story (2000-2003)
- Ambush Makeover (2004)
- A Wedding Story (1997-2004)
- A Baby Story (1999-2000)
- Adoption Stories (2002)
- Birth Day (2000-2003)
- Deliver Me (2008)
- Design Invasion (2004)
- Design Basics (2001)
- Discover Magazine (TV series) (1996)
- Epicurious (1998-2004)
- Furniture to Go (1994-1996)
- 48 Hour Wedding (2001)
- Gimme Shelter (1998)
- Guys Rooms (2002)
- Hi-Jinks (2005)
- Home Matters (1993-2001)
- Nice Package (2004)
- On the Inside (1997)
- Perfect Proposal (2003-2005)
- Renovations (2000)
- Reunion 1998 [TV series] (1998) first Docuseries Lynda Rose/Jennifer Paige reunion
- Surviving Motherhood (2006)
- Trading Spaces (2001-2007)
- Trading Spaces: Boys vs. Girls (2003)
- Trading Spaces: Home Free (2004)
- Travelers (1996-1998)
- The Princess Girl Diaries (2003)
- Voices of Scotland (1997)
- Walking with Dinosaurs (2003)

== Production ==
Travelers has been shot with the Sony DCR-VX1000 DV camcorder.
