= Omnifilm Entertainment =

Canadian television and film production company

- Company type: Private
- Industry: Entertainment
- Founded: 1979; 47 years ago
- Founder: Robert McLachlan
- Headquarters: Vancouver, British Columbia, Canada
- Key people: Michael Chechik; Gabriela Schonbach; Brian Hamilton
- Production output: Television programs; Documentaries
- Services: Production; Post-production; Distribution
- Subsidiaries: Bay City Productions; Middleton Productions; Lakeshore Productions; Gabby Productions
- Website: omnifilm.com

Omnifilm Entertainment is a Canadian independent television and film production company headquartered in Vancouver, British Columbia. The company produces content across a range of genres, including drama, comedy, children's programming, and factual and lifestyle series for Canada and international markets. With sister companies Omnifilm Post and Omnifilm Releasing, Omnifilm handles the development, production, post-production, and distribution of its content worldwide for both broadcast and digital platforms.

== Productions ==
=== Comedy ===
- Mech-X4
- Fast Layne
- Gabby Duran & the Unsittables
- Kim Possible

=== Drama ===
- Alice I Think
- Arctic Air
- The Bletchley Circle: San Francisco
- Defying Gravity
- Dragon Boys
- Edgemont
- Fakes
- Primeval: New World
- Robson Arms
- The Odyssey
- This Space for Rent

=== Factual ===
- Ancient Clues: aka Mysteries of the Dead
- Beachcombers –True Stories
- Bush Wreck Rescue
- Can't Stop Laughing
- CannaBiz
- Cantata For the King
- Champions of the Wild
- Creepy Crypts
- Dambusters FlyAgain
- Dinosaur Cold Case
- Dolphin Dealer
- Firestorm, The Fire Suppression Paradox
- Greenpeace: Making a Stand
- Greenpeace:Voyages to Save the Whales
- Gwaii Haanas
- Hi-Tech Culture
- Ice Pilots NWT
- In a Sacred Way We Build
- Jade Fever
- Keepers of the Fire
- Killer Whales in the Wild
- Make Some Noise
- Must Love Dogs
- Mysteries of the River Giant
- Mystery of the Toxic Swans
- Mystics, Mechanics & Mind Bombs
- Older Women/Younger Men
- Pyros
- Running on a Dream:The Legacy of Terry Fox
- Shock/Wave
- Singing Our Stories
- Slammin' Iron: Rebuilding the World
- Spidermania
- Stuntdawgs
- System Crash
- The Disappearance of the PX-15
- The Living Coast
- The Man Who Would be Moose
- Transplant Stories
- Touch the Wilderness
- Trailblazers
- Visions of Carmanah
- Weird Sex and Snowshoes
- Wild Bear Rescue
- Wild Horses of the Nemiah
- Within Reach
- Word Travels
- Wrestling with Destiny: The Life and Times of Daniel Igali
- Yukon's Wild Grizzlies

=== Lifestyle ===
- Healthy Home
- Namaste Yoga
- Namaste: The Five Elements
- Pure Design
- Quiet Mind
- Quiet Places
- She's Crafty
- Shimmy
- Smart Cookies
- Strong by NM
