= Desperate Houses! =

- Genre: Makeover
- Presented by: Clodagh Conroy (Series 1,3); Avril Murphy Allen (Series 2,3); Fiona Wilson (Series 4)
- Country of origin: Ireland
- Original language: English

Production
- Production location: Ireland
- Running time: 30 minutes
- Production company: COCO Television

Related
- RTÉ News: Six One; EastEnders; Desperate Housewives

Desperate Houses! is a television programme broadcast on RTÉ One. It is presented by interior designer Fiona Wilson and features the building contractor Ivan Duggan. Clodagh Conroy hosted the first series and the second series was presented by Avril Murphy Allen. The third series was an amalgamation of revisited houses from the previous two series. Each week the team helps declutter, revamp and redecorate a different home inside three days and with a budget limited to €2000. The fourth series began on 11 November 2008 and aired each Tuesday at 19:00.

== Episodes ==
=== Series one ===
Series one has been wiped from the online records.

=== Series two ===
Series two has been wiped from the online records.

=== Series three ===
In 2007, a number of "Desperate Houses" were revisited. The first three episodes revisited the first series. The final three episodes revisited the second series.

Date	Desperate House/Person(s)	Background	Ref
2007	Andrew and Denise Farrell and their two daughters Mia and Holly; Laytown, County Meath	A self-confessed compulsive buyer and hoarder, on Denise's previous appearance on the show she admitted she was unable to walk into a shop without buying something. Back then the house was cluttered with clothes upstairs and downstairs and the girls hardly ever wore the same outfit on two separate occasions.	Programme 1
2007	Florence Roche; Ballymun, Dublin	Roche is described as a busy mother with little time for organization. She lives in Poppintree in Ballymun with her husband Sean and their four sons, 14-year-old Keith, 12-year-old Kieran, seven-year-old Calum, and five-year-old Calvin. The house is a three-bedroom semi and the family have been living there for three years.	"Programme 2 - Ballymun"
2007	Marie Melia and her daughter Caitriona; Milltown	Melia has not been able to pass a charity shop or resist a car boot sale for as long as she could remember. This has resulted in a home which was overrun with clutter which included ornaments, tea-sets and books.	"Programme 3 - Milltown"
2007	Mary Anne Mullen and her seven-year-old son Shane; Rahoon, Galway	About three years ago, Mullen opened a charity shop in Galway to support an orphanage her mother is running in Kenya which provides a home to over 60 children who have been affected by AIDs. Mullen's home in Galway had three bedrooms; her daughter Sarah's old bedroom was a store room full to the brim with black bags for the charity shop. Mullen and Shane's bedrooms were not much better.	"Programme 4 - Galway"
2007	Geraldine and her daughter Sinéad; Finglas, Dublin	Geraldine lives in a small three-bedroom semi-detected house in Finglas East, with her 14-year-old daughter Sinéad. She has two sons, 21-year-old Aidan and 25-year-old Sean, who live with their father. Geraldine and the children's father have been separated for several years. Geraldine's own family have lived in this house for a long time – in fact Geraldine was born in the front bedroom. Geraldine's family have had a difficult time in the last few years. Her elderly parents, who had been living in the house, both died – Geraldine had been their primary carer. As well as this, her son Owen committed suicide. At about the same time, Patricia Reid got to know Geraldine and began to help her around the house. It was Reid who initially rang Desperate Houses. Her daughter is the same age as Geraldine's daughter Sinéad and they are best friends. Reid felt that Geraldine really deserved a helping hand from the Desperate Houses crew. Much of the clutter in the house belongs to either her deceased parents or her deceased son.	"Programme 5 - Finglas"
2007	Anna; Galway via Athlone/Letterkenny to Carlow	Anna is a native of Galway, although when she was in her teens she moved with her family (three brothers and one sister) to Athlone. A couple of years after finishing school, she got a job in Letterkenny with An Post. After completing her training in Letterkenny, she was transferred to Carlow. There she met "Pat the farmer" as she calls him. Her father had worked in the Department of Agriculture for years and she always swore that she would never marry a farmer. However she settled down to life on the farm and they have four kids, named David, Sarah, James and Andrew. Although Anna was based in Carlow, she remained very close with her two parents. Her mother died three years ago just as Anna was recovering from postnatal depression after giving birth to Andrew. Her mother's unexpected death worsened her depression. For months, her eldest daughter Sarah (then an 11-year-old) took over the running of the house. A friend suggested she see a homeopath and Anna's condition started to improve. All this affected the tidiness of the house. Pat's working hours were long due to the nature of his work. Anna has since retired from the post office and has enrolled herself in college to do a childcare course which she claims to love. Her home is a "good sized" detached house. The rooms in the worst condition are the playroom, the upstairs landing and her daughter's room. The entire house is fairly cluttered.	"Programme 6 - Carlow"

=== Series four ===
The fourth series contained six episodes and was broadcast over November and December 2008.

Date	Desperate House/Person(s)	Background	Ref
11 November 2008	Angie Williams; Letterfrack, County Galway	Williams, an artist and wood-turner originally from Liverpool, has been living in Letterfrack for nearly thirty years. She lives in a two-storey artisan cottage with her children Florence and Daniel. Her mother was from the area. Clutter includes wooden chairs hanging from her sitting room wall, an old cash register, several stained glass windows, many handbags and an elephant-calling hat.	Angie Williams - Letterfrack, County Galway
18 November 2008	Pat Barry; South Circular Road, Dublin	Barry's grandparents bought the house on South Circular Road in 1924 and Barry has lived there all his life. A home to three generations of the same family. Barry worked as a post office driver for twenty five years before his retirement, a keen pigeon fancier he used to cycle to races with his pigeons on the back of his bike. He's still in contact with racing crowd but no longer attends races, due to his arthritis. His childhood friend Rita Gill lives around the corner and every week Barry and Gill go to their local pub. Despite the fact they have been lifelong friends, Gill has never been inside Barry's house until now. Clutter includes newspapers from 1962, childhood toys and Barry's old ration book.	"Pat Barry - South Circular Road, Dublin"
25 November 2008	GG and MN; Lucan, Dublin	GG and MN claim to live in the "largest toy box in Ireland". The couple are both self-employed and live with their two children. MN is an insurance broker and GG runs an on-line baby store and is a baby massage instructor. It is impossible to walk down their hallway. It contains, amongst other things, GG's grandmother's hundred-year-old piano that they inherited six months ago. Even though it cannot be repaired GG refuses to part with it.	"GG and MN - Lucan, County Dublin"
2 December 2008	Carolann Brady; Donabate, County Dublin	Carolann is a full-time mother who lives with her two sons, 12-year-old Conor and 10-year-old Rónán. Conor recently received treatment for a rare form of cancer and their family routine has been disrupted as a result. Conor spent an amount of time in hospital with his mother, Rónán stayed with family friends and their dogs Ruby and Neo were fostered. Carolann wants the team to tackle the spare bedroom and transform it into a bedroom and play area for her boys. She would like to convert the bedroom the boys use into a study and guest bedroom.	"Carolann Brady - Donabate, County Dublin"
9 December 2008	Kay Roycroft; Bandon, County Cork	Kay is slowly coming to terms with her children's departure from the family home. She still buys three of everything, one for each sibling and this has added to the clutter in her home. Her living room is described as "completely unusable", whilst the tumble dryer is located in her bedroom. She also has the contents of several charity shops in her house.	"Kay Roycroft - Bandon, County Cork"
16 December 2008	Anne and Ashley Kerr Lim; Boyle, County Roscommon	Ashley (who is Chinese but was raised in Malaysia) is a retired pilot. He studies cookery in Killybegs. Anne is retired but works part-time in a call centre in Carrick-on-Shannon. The problem is not the living quarters of their house. Their clutter is in the loft and attic. This is largely because they have moved from a large house to a cottage. The two have travelled extensively and have collected items from across the world. They have no storage and Ashley desires a study area to complete his cookery studies.	"Anne & Ashley Kerr Lim - Boyle, County Roscommon"
