= Mystery Diagnosis =

- Narrated by: David Guion (2005–2009); David Scott (2009–2011)
- Country of origin: United States
- No. of seasons: 10
- No. of episodes: 89 (list of episodes)

Production
- Running time: 42 minutes (approximately)
- Production company: True Entertainment

Original release
- Network: Discovery Health (2005–2010); Oprah Winfrey Network (2011)
- Release: March 7, 2005 – June 29, 2011

Mystery Diagnosis is a television docudrama series that aired on Discovery Health Channel and OWN: Oprah Winfrey Network. Each episode focuses on two or more individuals who have struggled with obscure medical ailments, and their quest for a diagnosis. The program details the patients' and doctors' difficulty in pinpointing a diagnosis; often due to nonspecific symptoms, masquerading syndromes, the rarity of the condition or disease, or the patient's case being an unusual manifestation of said condition or disease.

The series debuted on Discovery Health Channel in 2005, and was continued when the Oprah Winfrey Network replaced Discovery Health on January 1, 2011. The last season premiered January 5, 2011.

== Description ==
Each episode tells the stories of two patients who experienced difficult to diagnose medical conditions. Each segment generally begins with a short description of the patient's life before they fell ill (or in the case of a young child, the parents' life before the child was born). The symptoms that the person experienced are described from their onset, usually becoming progressively worse; the progression is often re-enacted by actors while the original patient narrates. The show chronicles the patient's visits from doctor to doctor, where they may receive misdiagnoses or be told that the doctors have found nothing wrong. After continuing to experience symptoms for an extended period of time, the person discovers a doctor who is able to solve their case. The doctor reviews the patient's medical records, notices a symptom that his or her colleagues overlooked, performing tests, and finally reaching the correct diagnosis and giving the proper treatment. However, some episodes occasionally make inaccurate statements about the lack of treatment for certain conditions. This is due to the show's focus on showcasing unusual or rare conditions and the narrative structure, which prioritizes the medical mystery aspect rather than precise medical details, and may also oversimplify complex medical situations to fit the dramatic format, leading to highlighting less typical presentations or outcomes for dramatic impact, potentially creating a skewed perception of medical realities, as well as outdated information and oversimplification of conditions or treatments, potentially sacrificing some accuracy, such as in the case of Prader-Willi syndrome in the episode "The Boy Who Couldn't Stop Eating", which is incorrectly said that there is no treatment as well as omitting the loss of function of genes on the chromosome 15 from the father, even though the patient Conor Heybach went through therapy. This narrative structure may lead to certain details being emphasized or downplayed to enhance the dramatic arc, rather than providing a perfectly balanced and objective medical account. This is followed by a brief explanation of why the disorder was so difficult to diagnose, and a description of what the person's life is like today, and some have died after the episode's release.

The series has no regular cast except for its narrator, David Guion (2005–2009) and David Scott (2009–2011), who describes the patients' lives and the destruction their illnesses bring. The patients along with their friends and family help to narrate their stories.

While the majority of the conditions examined in the series are unusual or rare conditions (such as cryoglobulinemia) or genetic disorders, well-known conditions such as epilepsy, Myasthenia gravis, Alpha 1-antitrypsin deficiency, heart disease, Crohn's disease, pulmonary hypertension, Lyme disease, endocarditis and cancer have featured on the show. A significant number of episodes revolve around autoimmune disorders, ranging from Pyoderma gangrenosum to Paraneoplastic cerebellar degeneration.

== Episodes ==
Season	Episodes	Originally released		
Season	Episodes	First released	Last released	Network
1	9	March 7, 2005	December 5, 2005	Discovery Health Channel
2	10	January 9, 2006	June 19, 2006	Discovery Health Channel
3	8	April 9, 2007	September 3, 2007	Discovery Health Channel
4	6	October 8, 2007	December 17, 2007	Discovery Health Channel
5	10	January 14, 2008	April 14, 2008	Discovery Health Channel
6	12	November 24, 2008	April 20, 2009	Discovery Health Channel
7	8	August 10, 2009	November 30, 2009	Discovery Health Channel
8	6	March 8, 2010	April 12, 2010	Discovery Health Channel
9	10	June 7, 2010	October 4, 2010	Discovery Health Channel
10	10	January 5, 2011	June 29, 2011	OWN

== Other activities ==
In 2009, Mystery Diagnosis was named the program partner in organizing Rare Disease Day, an observance intended to raise awareness of rare diseases among the general public and policy-makers. Mystery Diagnosis worked with the United States coordinator, National Organization for Rare Disorders, to organize events across the country for observing Rare Disease Day at the end of February.

All episodes formerly premiered on Discovery Health channel, The Learning Channel (TLC), and sometimes on the Discovery Channel. As of January 2011, new episodes were aired on OWN. The show later re-aired on Discovery Life.

The show is not currently on Discovery+, the streaming service offered by Discovery.
