= Ambush Makeover =

- Genre: Reality TV
- Created by: Benjamin Ringe; Chris Deaux
- Written by: John Bertholon; Michelle Pollino
- Starring: William Whatley; Nicole Williams; Mary Alice Haney; Anthony Perinelli (season 2); Gigi Berry; Nancy Brensson; Rob Talty (season 1)
- Country of origin: United States
- Original language: English
- No. of seasons: 2
- No. of episodes: 130

Production
- Executive producers: Susan Cohen Dickler; Jan Dickler; Ray Murray; Julie G. Rose
- Producer: Michael Newport
- Production location: Atlanta, Georgia
- Editors: Jeff Kohr; Eddie Machado; Tim Johnson
- Camera setup: Chris Selvard; Ian Saladyga; Dan Crapfl; Doug Snowden
- Running time: 30 minutes
- Production companies: Banyan Productions; 20th Television

Original release
- Network: Syndication; Discovery Channel
- Release: September 1, 2004 – September 9, 2005

Ambush Makeover is an American reality television series which aired in syndication and the Discovery Channel from 2004 to 2005. The show aired on Fox-owned stations during its first season, and then went into national syndication for the second season before being cancelled by Discovery. Reruns aired on Ion Life.

== Premise and format ==
Each episode follows a regular outline:

- Style Agent Intro - There are a number of "style agents" that act as the host and present ideas for the makeover of an individual. The agents are well dressed and hip to the local fashion scenes they invade. The agents's names are: Anthony Perinelli (season 2), Mary Alice Haney, Gigi Berry, Nancy Brensson, Nicole Williams, William Whatley (all from seasons 1-2), and Rob Talty (season 1).
- Search - The host is on the streets of a large city and is looking for a target which is sporting a bad hairdo, old fashion, etc. The host tells the target how bad they look. Some targets reject this opportunity to be on the show.
- Salon Intro - The target is walked to a salon and meets the team that will work on him/her. Each member tells the camera what they are planning to do with the target.
- Coloring - Most episodes include a part in which the target is given a new hair color.
- Outfit Shopping - The host takes the target to a boutique and tries on a variety on outfits that might be suitable for the event that evening. This involves negotiation between the target and style agent.
- Final Cut, Makeup - The target is given the finishing touches to his/her makeover. This includes the haircut and if in the case of a female target makeup is also done.
- Results Revealed - The target is shown the results of their makeover. Most are comfortable with their new look and thank the salon crew and the agent.
- Event - The target is taken to the event held especially for them. The guests are asked to close their eyes before getting the surprise of the targets makeover. A close relative speaks to the camera about their loved ones makeover.
