= Christopher Hopkins =

American singer

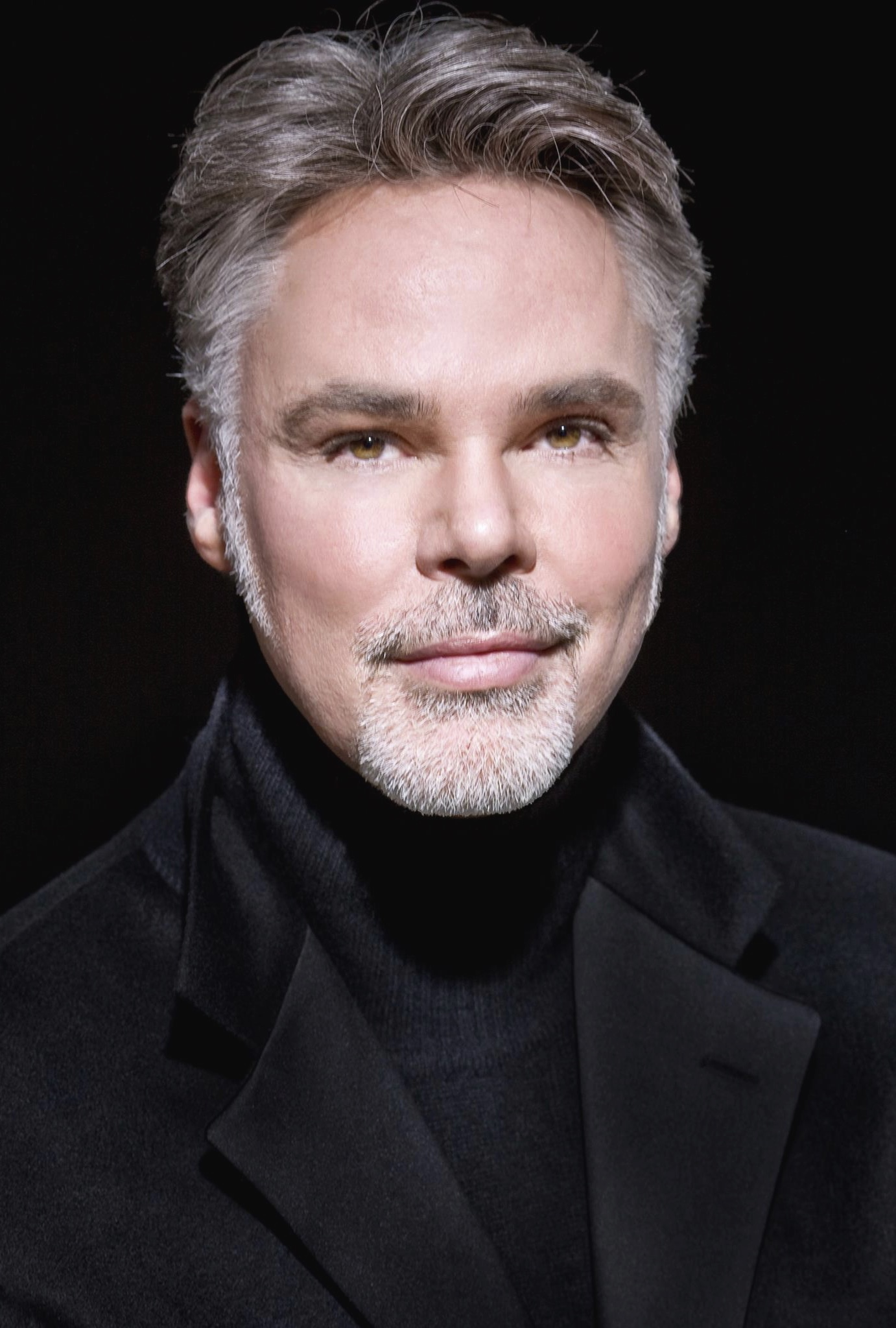
Christopher Hopkins in 2016

Christopher Jon Hopkins (January 24, 1964, in Minneapolis, Minnesota - November 22, 2025) was an entrepreneur, author, content creator, singer and makeover artist.

== Early life ==
Hopkins was raised in Redwood Falls, Minnesota, where he received state honors in declamation, piano and voice at Redwood Falls High School. In 1982 he attended St. Olaf College in Northfield, Minnesota, where he soloed as a freshman with the St. Olaf Choir.

== Career ==
In 1990, Hopkins opened Christopher Hopkins Salon, located in the Hubbard Broadcasting building, home of KSTP, KSTP-FM, and KSTP-TV. There he was responsible for the looks of the on-air talent and became a regular contributing guest on Good Company, a local daytime talk show hosted by Steve Edelman and Sharon Anderson.

Hopkins relocated his company to downtown Minneapolis in 1994, renaming it Christopher Hopkins Image Center (CHIC). He appeared on national television including HGTV, The Oprah Winfrey Show, and the Today Show. Hopkins has worked with celebrities including Hillary Clinton.

As a baritone vocal soloist he performed with the Minnesota Orchestra, a PBS televised performance with the Erie Philharmonic, the Grand Teton Music Festival, and the Hannover Radio Philharmonic (Norddeutscher Rundfunk) in Germany. His 1999 debut vocal album I'll Be Seeing You was nominated for the 1999 Gay Lesbian American Music Awards for the song "A Nightingale Sang in Berkeley Square".

In March 2008, Hopkins authored his first book, Staging Your Comeback: A Complete Beauty Revival for Women Over 45. He is the founder and former co-owner of reVamp! salon and spa in Minneapolis.

Frustrated by the laborious process of negotiating a television series, Hopkins created his own internet series entitled Whadja Do Today? in September 2009. What began as an attempt to speed the process and showcase a more authentic approach to his persona ended after 100 daily episodes on December 24 of that year.

Following the success of Whadja Do Today?, Hopkins began a new series of makeover videos in June 2010. This series showcases dramatic real makeovers of men and women from around the world. Originally entitled The Makeover Guy Reveals, the series name was changed to The Power of Pretty brand makeovers in 2013.

Hopkins and Robert Lindquist left reVamp! salon and spa and opened "MAKEOVERGUY" in September 2017, located on the Mississippi Riverfront in Minneapolis. reVamp! salon and spa closed its doors on November 30, 2019.

Until Mr. Hopkins’ death, he and Lindquist continued to own and operate MAKEOVERGUY® with a focus on online content and makeover services.

== Death ==
Hopkins died on November 22, 2025.
