= CNBC Titans =

CNBC Titans is a documentary television series airing on CNBC featuring some of the most famous personalities, companies, and entrepreneurs in the world of business.

Those featured on the show are the following.

- George Foreman (August 11, 2010)
- Ted Turner (September 22, 2010)
- Hugh Hefner (October 13, 2010)
- Donald Trump (November 17, 2010)
- Merv Griffin (December 2, 2010)
- Steve Jobs (June 23, 2011)
- Procter & Gamble (July 7, 2011)
- Herb Kelleher (July 14, 2011)
- Quincy Jones (July 21, 2011)
- Milton Hershey (July 28, 2011)
- Lee Iacocca (August 11, 2011)
- Barry Diller (August 18, 2011)
- Leo Burnett (August 25, 2011)
