= Call 911 (TV series) =

American reality TV series (2007–2012)

- Genre: Docudrama
- Directed by: Tom Jennings
- Theme music composer: Lenny Williams
- Composer: 5 Alarm Music
- Country of origin: United States
- Original language: English
- No. of seasons: 2
- No. of episodes: 60 + original TV special

Production
- Executive producer: Tom Jennings
- Producer: Marcus Yasui
- Running time: 30 minutes

Original release
- Network: Court TV, Investigation Discovery, Discovery Fit & Health
- Release: August 21, 2007 – May 23, 2012

Call 911 is a television show that premiered as a Court TV special on August 21, 2007, and began airing as a series on July 30, 2008 on Investigation Discovery. The series began airing on Discovery Fit & Health in February 2011. Each episode documents real 911 calls from people in trouble to emergency dispatchers. Call 911 was initially picked up as a twenty-episode series, but Investigation Discovery ordered a second season which consisted of 40 additional episodes.
