= Etcetera (TV program) =

- Created by: Solar Entertainment Corporation (2011-15); Nine Media Corporation (2011-14); Radio Philippines Network (2011–13); Southern Broadcasting Network (2013–15)
- Developed by: ETC Productions
- Creative director: Sheila de Asis
- Presented by: Melania le Troyes; Mari Jasmine
- Country of origin: Philippines
- Original language: English
- No. of seasons: 6
- No. of episodes: 72

Production
- Executive producers: Joanna Rodriguez; Georgett Tengco
- Running time: 30 minutes
- Production company: ETC Productions

Original release
- Network: ETC
- Release: October 23, 2011 – December 3, 2015

Etcetera (stylized in all lowercase since 2014) is a Philippine lifestyle and magazine show produced by Solar Entertainment Corporation and broadcast by ETC from October 23, 2011, to December 3, 2015.

== Background ==
=== 2011–2013; Grandiage and Jones era ===
The show was launched on October 23, 2011, on ETC, then airing via RPN Channel 9, as a result of Solar Entertainment Corporation's launching ETC Productions. Originally airing as a 15-minute capsule-based program, it expanded to a full 30-minute program during its third season in 2013. It was hosted by model and lifestyle blogger Patti Grandidge with Kim Jones as a roving reporter. On November 30, 2013, ETC switched its affiliation to SBN Channel 21 and the program was continued to air with the channel.

=== 2013–2015; Jones, Jasmine and LeTroyes ===
Grandidge gave up her hosting duties shortly after the fourth season ended and on July 27, 2014, the 5th season of the show premiered with Jones remaining as host joined by newcomer Mari Jasmine. After a successful five-season run on Etcetera, Jones left to pursue other opportunities. For the sixth-season premiere which aired in 2015, Fil-Canadian-Spanish model and opera singer Melania le Troyes (née Solano) was introduced as the new host alongside Jasmine.

== Hosts ==
=== Final hosts ===
- Mari Jasmine (2014–15)
- Mélania le Troyes (Mélania Solano) (2015)

=== Former hosts ===
- Kim Jones (2011–14)
- Patti Grandidge (2011–13)

== Program format ==
Etcetera covers many topics relevant to their main audience which is the "stylish Filipina youth" and presents the different segments as capsules about fashion, beauty, TV, music and lifestyle. The series has been praised for its consistency in presenting its brand as well as being loyal to the imaging of ETC channel, in general. Various celebrities have appeared in the show such as supermodel Tweetie de Leon and America's Next Top Model winner Sophie Sumner.

== Gallery ==
Logo used from seasons 1 to 3

Logo used only in season 4

== See also ==
- List of programs previously broadcast by SolarFlix
