= A Makeover Story =

- Genre: Reality Television
- Country of origin: United States
- Original language: English

Production
- Running time: 30 minutes
- Production company: Banyan Productions

Original release
- Network: TLC Network; Discovery Channel
- Release: 25 September 2000

A Makeover Story is a reality show on TLC Network in the United States. Each episode ran for 30 minutes and featured two people who get makeovers including clothes, hairstyling, and makeup. Richard Monahan was the executive producer of the premier season, which was the #1 rated daytime series for TLC. The show ran for five seasons and is the original of the "makeover show" formats.

In its later seasons, "A Makeover Story" added hosts in the form of fashion experts, featuring fashion consultant Dan Brickley, costume designer Alison Freer, hairstylist Moses Jones, and salon owner Gretchen Monahan.
