= The Next Big Thing: NY =

- Genre: Reality
- Presented by: Trapper Felides
- Country of origin: United States
- Original language: English
- No. of seasons: 1
- No. of episodes: 6

Production
- Executive producers: David St. John; Eric Cyphers; Izzie Pick Ashcroft; Jane Tranter; Jo Honig; Stacey Angeles
- Production companies: BBC Worldwide Productions; Omelette Bar Productions

Original release
- Network: Oxygen
- Release: June 12 – July 11, 2012

The Next Big Thing: NY is an American reality television series on Oxygen. The series debuted on June 12, 2012, and follows performance coaches that mentoring a group of entertainers seeking their breakthrough in show business.

== Episodes ==
| No. | Title | Original release date |
|---|---|---|
| 1 | "Showtime at The Apollo!" | June 12, 2012 |
| 2 | "Trapper Nose Best" | June 19, 2012 |
| 3 | "Not So Sweet 17" | June 27, 2012 |
| 4 | "Stage Mommy Dearest" | July 4, 2012 |
| 5 | "It's a Hard Knock Life for Trapper" | July 11, 2012 |
| 6 | "Nobody Puts Baby T in a Corner" | July 11, 2012 |
