= Mary Alice Haney =

American fashion designer

- Occupation: Fashion designer

Mary Alice Haney is an American fashion designer.

== Early life ==
Mary Alice Haney grew up in Chattanooga, Tennessee, attended Parsons School of Design in Paris while working with Harper's Bazaar, and earned an MFA in film studies from the American Film Institute. She worked alongside legendary editor Polly Allen Mellen at Allure, where her first shoot was for Angelina Jolie’s first cover. As West Coast fashion editor for GQ and Marie Claire, she collaborated with photographers Mario Testino, Regan Cameron, Mark Seliger and Norman Jean Roy.

== HANEY ==
In 2013 Mary Alice launched HANEY, based in downtown Los Angeles, to bring a Hollywood sensibility to every woman. Her signature style is a sophisticated sexiness that exudes luxury and confidence, creating dresses that are red carpet–glamorous but still easy and relaxed. Celebrity clientele include Jennifer Lawrence, Emily Ratajkowski, Chrissy Teigen, Kate Hudson. Taylor Swift wore a HANEY navy blue Gia dress at the 2016 GLAAD Awards.
