= Big Medicine =

- Genre: Reality
- Created by: Stephen David; Darryl M. Silver
- Country of origin: United States
- Original language: English
- No. of seasons: 3
- No. of episodes: 31

Production
- Producers: Laura Cannon, Mark D'Anna
- Production company: The Idea Factory

Original release
- Network: TLC
- Release: May 28, 2007 – November 18, 2009

Big Medicine is an American reality television show that examined the effects of bariatric surgery, both physical and emotional, on obese patients. It also chronicled the ordeals of the patients leading up to surgery. It aired on TLC from May 28, 2007, until November 18, 2009. Big Medicine was taped at the Weight Management Center of The Methodist Hospital in Houston, Texas. Operating on the patients are the father and son surgical team of Dr. Robert Davis and Dr. Garth Davis. Before the final determination to operate is reached, patients are examined psychologically by Psychotherapist Mary Jo Rapini. Often, patients with excess skin after their weight-loss is achieved will be referred to Dr. John LoMonaco, a plastic surgeon.
