= One (Canadian TV channel) =

Canadian TV channel

- Current logo of One
- Country: Canada
- Broadcast area: Nationwide
- Headquarters: Toronto, Ontario

Programming
- Language: English
- Picture format: 1080i (HDTV) (2017-present); 480i (SDTV) (2001-present)

Ownership
- Owner: ZoomerMedia

History
- Launched: September 7, 2001, 23 years ago
- Former names: One: The Body, Mind & Spirit Channel (2001-2011); The Brand New One: Body, Mind, Spirit, Love Channel (2011-2015); One: Get Fit (2015-2021)

Links
- Website: One

One (often referred to as ONE: Get Fit or ONETV) is a Canadian English language discretionary cable and satellite specialty channel owned by ZoomerMedia. It offers lifestyle and entertainment programming devoted to programming on yoga and meditation, weight loss and fitness, sex and relationships, natural health and nutrition, and alternative medicine. Additionally, it provides general entertainment programming during primetime.

== History ==
Original logo used from September 7, 2001, to May 1, 2011

On November 24, 2000, a consortium consisting of Vision TV Digital (a subsidiary of S-VOX), Radio Nord Communications and Wisdom Media Group, were granted approval for a Category 1 television licence by the Canadian Radio-television and Telecommunications Commission (CRTC). The channel was tentatively known as Wisdom: Canada's Body, Mind & Spirit Channel. Prior to the channel's launch, its ownership was restructured giving Alliance Atlantis and Renewal Partners Company a minority stake in the channel, while Wisdom Media Group's stake was sold. The channel was launched as One: the Body, Mind & Spirit channel on September 7, 2001.

On January 18, 2008, a joint venture between Canwest and Goldman Sachs Alternatives, known as CW Media, bought Alliance Atlantis and gained its minority interest in One. In June 2009, S-VOX announced it would sell its broadcasting assets, including One, to ZoomerMedia, a company controlled by Moses Znaimer. The sale was approved by the CRTC on March 30, 2010. ZoomerMedia assumed control of S-VOX's broadcasting assets on June 30, 2010.

Logo used from 2011 to 2015

On October 27, 2010, Shaw Communications completed its acquisition of Canwest and Goldman Sachs' interest in CW Media, giving it control of CW Media's 37.77% interest in One. However, in March 2011, Shaw and the other minority stake holders sold their shares in the channel to ZoomerMedia, giving it 100% ownership.

On April 26, 2011, ZoomerMedia announced that it would rebrand the channel as The Brand New ONE: Body, Mind, Spirit, Love Channel on May 1, 2011. In addition to a new name, the rebrand introduced a new logo, on-air presentation, and programming, through a licensing agreement with the U.S.-based Veria TV. Although the channel introduced new programming, the channel focuses largely on the same genre of programming as it previously did with the addition of programs related to romantic relationships, as indicated by the addition of "Love" to its moniker.

One: Get Fit logo

On October 29, 2015, via a Facebook post, the channel announced that it was rebranding as One which will coincide with a national free preview of the channel on November 2, 2015. The rebrand will introduce new on-screen graphics, a website, logo, and programming; however, the channel will focus largely on the same programming genre.

In the fall of 2021, the channel dropped the "Get Fit" from its logo and name, instead replacing it with "TV" and marketing itself as an exercise and entertainment channel, airing general entertainment programming in primetime.

== International expansion ==
ONETV US logo

In the spring of 2021, ONE TV launched as a fitness channel in the United States as ONE TV US on the online streaming service, Distro TV, marking the first time it has launched in a country other than Canada.

== One HD ==
On March 23, 2017, ZoomerMedia launched One HD, a 1080i high definition simulcast of the standard definition feed. The HD feed is currently available on Bell Fibe TV, Optik TV, and Shaw Direct.
