= I Didn't Know I Was Pregnant =

American documentary television series

- Genre: Documentary
- Country of origin: United States
- No. of seasons: 4
- No. of episodes: 58

Production
- Running time: 21 minutes (excluding commercials)
- Production company: Mike Mathis Productions

Original release
- Network: Discovery Fit & Health; TLC
- Release: May 26, 2009 – October 19, 2011

I Didn't Know I Was Pregnant is an American documentary television series that aired on Discovery Fit & Health and TLC. The series debuted on May 26, 2009 on Discovery Fit & Health. Each episode features two or more women who were unaware that they were pregnant until they went into labor.

Frequent reasons for the subjects not recognizing pregnancy include:

- Mistaking the symptoms for another condition or illness.
- Believing they were infertile, and thus not considering pregnancy a possible cause of symptoms.
- Not having any of the "traditional" symptoms (weight gain, extended abdomen, feeling of movement in stomach, morning sickness, unusual food cravings).
- Assuming their birth control methods were 100% effective.
- Vaginal bleeding during pregnancy being misinterpreted as a period.
- False negative pregnancy tests.

== Production history and cancellation ==
The series is shown on Discovery en Español and the OWN.

TLC pulled the series from its schedule on July 15, 2011 citing low ratings. TLC announced in late July that the series would return to finish its fourth and final season on August 17, 2011. The final episode aired on October 19, 2011.

TLC reprised the series in 2015 for special episodes titled I Still Didn't Know I Was Pregnant, featuring women who have had two surprise pregnancies.
