= A Baby Story =

American reality series

- Genre: Reality
- Written by: Jennifer MacLean
- Directed by: Sitarah Pendelton; Les Sekely
- Country of origin: United States
- Original language: English

Production
- Production locations: Los Angeles, California, United States
- Production companies: Pie Town Productions; Banyan Productions; True Entertainment

Original release
- Network: TLC; Discovery Channel
- Release: January 1, 1998 – August 29, 2007

Related
- Bringing Home Baby

A Baby Story is an American reality series that began airing on TLC and Discovery Channel in 1998 and continued until 2007.

== Overview ==
The series follows a couple through the late days of their pregnancy, sometimes presenting a baby shower, last family outing, or dinner party. Then, it always shows the family getting ready to go to the hospital, birth center, or preparing for a home birth. It films the labor and birth, which is shown in the series. At the end, the family talks about life after the newborn and offers the baby a few weeks after birth. The couple then spends some time playing with their child before the episode ends.

== Storyline ==
According to the producers of the series, the intent was to include a happy ending at the end of every episode.

== Return ==
In 2016, TLC revived the show by livestreaming a childbirth via Facebook.
