= Discovery Life =

American pay television network

- Headquarters: Silver Spring, Maryland, U.S.

Programming
- Picture format: 1080i HDTV (downscaled to letterboxed 480i for the SDTV feed)

Ownership
- Owner: Skydance Corporation
- Sister channels: see list of assets owned by Skydance Corporation

History
- Launched: February 1, 2011; 15 years ago
- Replaced: Discovery Health Channel; FitTV
- Former names: Discovery Fit & Health; (2011–2015)

Links
- Website: discoverylife.com

Availability

Streaming media
- Service(s): Hulu with Live TV, Philo, Vidgo

Discovery Life is an American cable television network owned by Skydance Corporation. Launched on February 1, 2011 as Discovery Fit & Health, it was the result of the merger of the Discovery Health Channel and FitTV, following the former's replacement in its channel space by the Oprah Winfrey Network. The channel primarily focuses on reality programming dealing with "life events". Its programming targets a female audience, and consists of reruns drawn from the libraries of its predecessors and TLC.

As of November 2023, Discovery Life is available to approximately 24,000,000 pay television households in the United States-down from its 2017 peak of 47,000,000 households. Along with American Heroes Channel, Boomerang, Cooking Channel, Destination America, Discovery Family, and Science Channel, Discovery Life is among the less prevalent networks of Warner Bros. Discovery.

In recent years, Discovery Life has lost carriage with the growth of streaming alternatives including its parent company's HBO Max, and has generally been depreciated by Warner Bros. Discovery in current retransmission consent negotiations with cable and streaming providers.

== History ==
Logo used until 2016.

On January 17, 2011, Discovery Communications announced that FitTV would be re-launched as Discovery Fit & Health on February 1, 2011. Its formation was the result of Discovery Health's replacement with the Oprah Winfrey Network (OWN) at the beginning of the year; the company noted that Discovery Health's programming still had loyal viewership, even as the network was being wound down in favor of OWN. Initially, the channel's programming was similar to what was being carried by Discovery Health, but with a fitness-oriented block in the morning featuring FitTV programs. On January 15, 2015, the channel was re-branded as Discovery Life. The rebranding was meant to reflect a broadening of the network's concept targeting women aged 25–54, focusing upon life events and "the drama inherent in our everyday lives".

== Predecessors ==
=== Discovery Health Channel ===

Discovery Health Channel was an American subscription television channel. Launched in July 1998, it was owned by Discovery Communications as a spin-off of Discovery Channel, focusing on health and wellness-oriented programming.

In the beginning, DHC's programming consisted of reruns of medical- and health-themed programming from other Discovery networks, particularly TLC. As the network matured, it began producing its own reality series, mostly dealing with babies (Babies: Special Delivery, Birth Day), bodies (Plastic Surgery: Before and After, National Body Challenge), and medicine (The Critical Hour, Dr. G: Medical Examiner). DHC also showed episodes of the CBS medical drama series Chicago Hope on a semi-regular basis. DHC also aired fitness-related programming, most of which later spun off to its sister network FitTV. DHC won its first Daytime Emmy in 2004 for its original series about adoptive families, Adoption Stories.

=== FitTV ===

FitTV was an American pay television channel, owned by Discovery Communications. The channel focused on fitness and exercise-related programming. FitTV offered programming with such fitness celebrities as Cathe Friedrich, Sharon Mann, Gilad Janklowicz, Marilu Henner, Tamilee Webb and others.

==== History ====
International Family Entertainment (IFE) introduced a continuous preview of the Cable Health Club on August 20, 1993. Beginning August 31 of that year, the channel would be available in a half-hour continuous programming format to cable system operators for free. In October, the channel moved to 24-hour programming. Jake Steinfeld, who had starred on the network's Big Brother Jake, hosted its first program and was a constant presence on the channel in its early years.

The original formatting of an hour on Cable Health Club included a 20-minute aerobic conditioning workout at the top of the hour featuring Tamilee Webb; a segment on healthy living; a Body by Jake workout starting at the bottom of the hour; and "Fitness Plus", a home shopping segment for fitness items and equipment.

In 1994, Cable Health Club received new sponsors and minority partners, Reebok International (its first charter advertiser) and Liberty Media. By this time, the channel was received in one million homes and carried for two hours a day on the Family Channel. By November 1994, the Club was sharing a channel with Prime Sports Northwest on Seattle cable.

In January 1997, Cox Communications paired the service with Home Team Sports between the hours of 5:30–11 a.m. The service took out full-page ads in The Virginian-Pilot newspaper through May 4, requesting viewers to call a toll free number to register support for the channel to be 24 hours with responses forwarded to Cox.

By April 1997, the Cable Health Club was renamed Fit TV. In June 1997, IFE was acquired by a joint venture of Fox Entertainment Group and Saban Entertainment; the companies were primarily targeting its sister network The Family Channel.

America's Health Network was in separate operation from FitTV from March 1996 until 1999. The channel was based in Orlando, Florida and had an $11 million production center with 16,500-square-foot (1,530 m^{2}) soundstage built at Universal Studios in late 1995. The executives at the channel were Joe Maddox (a former Discovery Channel executive) and Webster "Web" Golinkin, who had spent two and a half years planning, raising $75 million in capital, and building the channel. The majority owner was the Providence Journal Company. The channel also had a five-year agreement with Mayo Clinic and IVI Publishing, its electronic publisher, to provide medical information and illustrative graphics. Mayo and IVI were also minority owners of the channel, and other investors included venture capital firm Medical Innovation Partners, Inc.

15 minutes an hour on AHN was devoted to shopping. The "Health Mall" carried upscale, harder-to-find items for a healthy living. AHN had a deal with Clearwater, Florida-based Home Shopping Network to provide orders and shipping infrastructure. For cable operators, carriage deals included a small percentage of advertising and shopping revenue.

With an initial cable audience of 200,000 subscribers, America's Health Network had reached 700,000 subscribers by May 1996 and 6 million by the time of the sale of its first majority owners. However, cable carriage was a long struggle for AHN and other cable outlets that launched in this time frame (Electronic Media, now TV Week magazine, described the environment many cable networks launched in 1996 faced as a "jungle"). Time Warner Cable, the primary cable provider in Orlando, did not carry AHN, and so many people in the channel's own hometown were unable to see its programs.

In 1997, Providence Journal was bought by the A.H. Belo Corporation. It was Belo's first venture into cable television; according to Golinkin, Belo did not desire to gain any market share in cable. 161 of the channel's 200 employees were laid off, and they ceased producing live programs. The 39 employees that remained (including the entire management team) were a skeleton crew to keep the channel running. A sale of most of the Belo stake to Columbia/HCA Health Care Corp. for $50 million was soon proposed. Columbia wanted to put AHN in its nearly 500 hospitals and surgery centers, plus many more outpatient clinics. However, during this time period, federal investigations over its billing practices; government raids; charges of Columbia officials with conspiracy and fraud; and changes in management at Columbia/HCA "turned [the company] upside down", according to a senior official. This turmoil spurred reviews of company strategies and the cancellation of some transactions, including the sale of the AHN stake. New York real estate tycoon Howard Milstein offered a bridge loan, which was accepted. Belo's stake eventually was brought back by AHN. An investment group of former Columbia/HCA officials, including Richard Scott and David Vandewater, took control of the network in late 1997, and live series resumed.

During this time, another minority investor in the channel was Access Health, a referral service.

On June 16, 1998, AHN presented the first human birth carried live over the Internet, from Orlando's Arnold Palmer Hospital for Children. The birth brought AHN major national and worldwide media attention and was even the focus of an editorial cartoon two days later in USA Today. By this time, it reached 8 million cable homes, comparable to the CNN/SI cable network (which would fold in 2002) and the Game Show Network.

By June 1999, Scott and Vandewater had reduced their stake in America's Health.

On September 12, 1999, Fox Cable Networks Group bought America's Health Network, owned by Rick Scott & David Vandewater, and merged it with FitTV, which Fox Cable already owned. The resulting network was named The Health Network. In December, Fox Cable sold 50% of the channel to WebMD.

By the start of the year 2000, The Health Network reached 17.5 million homes. At the start of 2000, the station began new headquarters in Los Angeles, and about half of its Orlando workforce was laid off, leaving 40 people out of work. The station also ran supplementary offices in New York and Nashville. At the time, The Health Network stated it was moving more of its production to New York and Los Angeles so it could feature more celebrities on its lineup. In the fall of 2000, it very nearly relaunched as WebMD Television, with new programs and the removal of the AHN studio program library from its schedule; that plan was put on hold, and Fox received the 50% of the channel it had sold back from WebMD, which had lost $2 billion in 2000.

On September 1, 2001, Discovery Communications bought The Health Network from Fox Entertainment Group for $255 million in cash and equity. On January 1, 2004, Discovery reinstated the "FitTV" name, as Discovery recently owned its own health channel, Discovery Health.

In March 2006, New York-based Cablevision dropped the channel from its systems, resulting in the loss of some three million subscribers (down to 35 million). In January 2011, the channel's carriage remained significantly lower than most cable networks, only holding a reach of 50 million homes.

==== Former programs ====
- Total Body Sculpt with Gilad
- Shimmy
- Gilad's Bodies in Motion
- Namaste Yoga
- Power Hour
- In Shape with Sharon Mann
- Cathe Friedrich
- All Star Workouts
- Marilu Henner's Shape Up Your Life
- Art of the Athlete
- Blaine's Low Carb Kitchen
- FitNation
- Housecalls
- Ultimate Goals
- Diet Doctor
- The Gym
- No Opportunity Wasted
- Reunion Story
- Lyon in the Kitchen
- Get Fresh with Sara Snow
- Cardio Blast
- Caribbean Workout

== Programming ==
The network's schedule consists primarily of library programs (including series and specials) from TLC. Programs span the topics of medical emergencies (Untold Stories of the E.R., Mystery Diagnosis), addiction and mental illness (Cracking Addiction, Hoarding: Buried Alive), pregnancy and childbirth (A Baby Story, Outrageous Births: Tales from the Crib), and sex (Sex Sent Me to the ER). The channel does not currently originate any first-run programming.
