= Wizards of Drag =

- RuPaul's Drag Race episode
- Episode no.: Season 8 Episode 6
- Presented by: RuPaul
- Original air date: April 11, 2016

Guest appearances
- Todrick Hall (guest judge); Marc Jacobs (guest judge); cast members of Little Women: LA, including Christy McGinity Gibel and Terra Jolé

Episode chronology
← Previous "Supermodel Snatch Game"	Next → "Shady Politics"
- RuPaul's Drag Race season 8

"Wizards of Drag" is the sixth episode of the eighth season of the American television series RuPaul's Drag Race. It originally aired on April 11, 2016, and was followed by an episode of RuPaul's Drag Race: Untucked. The episode's main challenge tasks the contestants with giving makeovers to women from the television series Little Women: LA. Todrick Hall and Marc Jacobs are guest judges. Naomi Smalls wins the main challenge. Robbie Turner is eliminated from the competition after placing in the bottom and losing a lip-sync contest against Derrick Barry to "I Love It" (2012) by Icona Pop.

== Episode ==
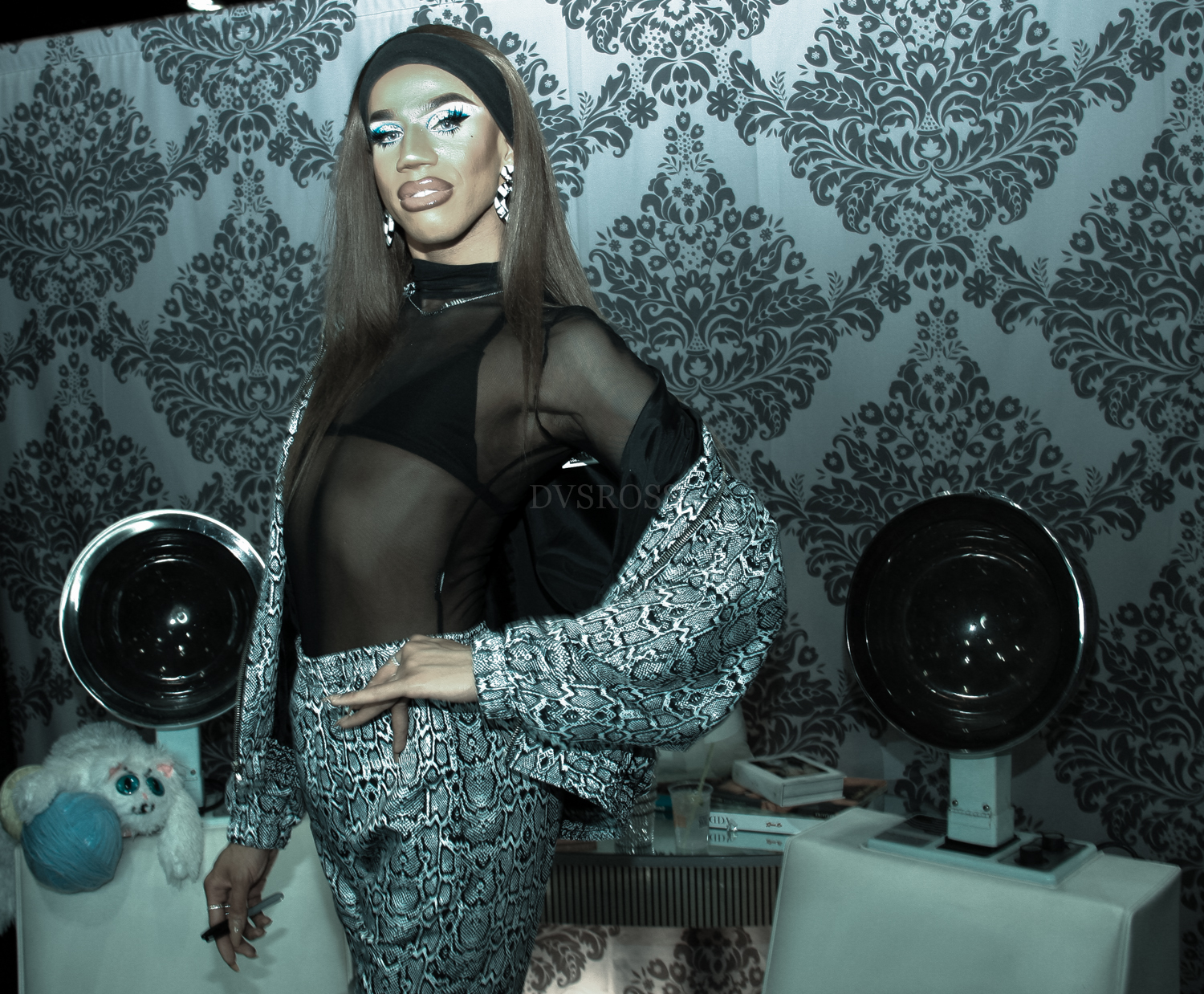
Naomi Smalls (pictured at RuPaul's DragCon LA in 2019) wins the episode's main challenge.

The contestants return to the workroom after Acid Betty's elimination on the previous episode. On a new day, RuPaul and a writer from Entertainment Weekly greet the group and reveal the mini-challenge, which tasks the contestants with "reading" (playfully insulting) each other. Bob the Drag Queen is declared the winner. RuPaul then reveals the Wizard of Oz-themed main challenge, which tasks the contestants with giving makeovers based on fictional characters to women from the television series Little Women: LA. Following are the teams and Oz characters:

- Briana – The Wicked Witch – Kim Chi
- Brittney – The Citizen of Emerald City – Thorgy Thor
- Christy – The Cowardly Lion – Robbie Turner
- Elena – Glinda the Good Witch – Bob the Drag Queen
- Terra – Tin Woodman – Derrick Barry
- Jasmine – The Scarecrow – Naomi Smalls
- Tonya – Dorothy – Chi Chi Devayne
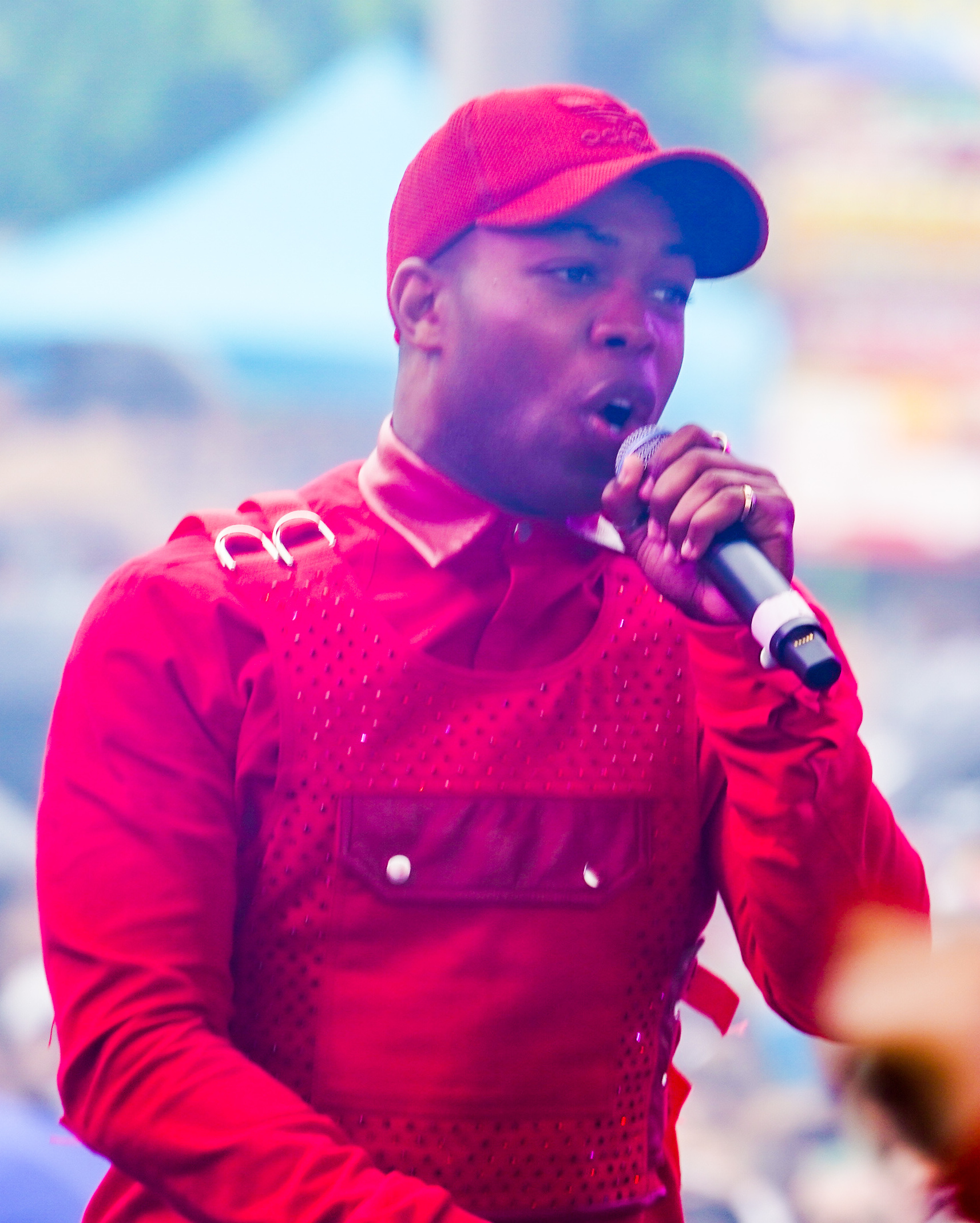
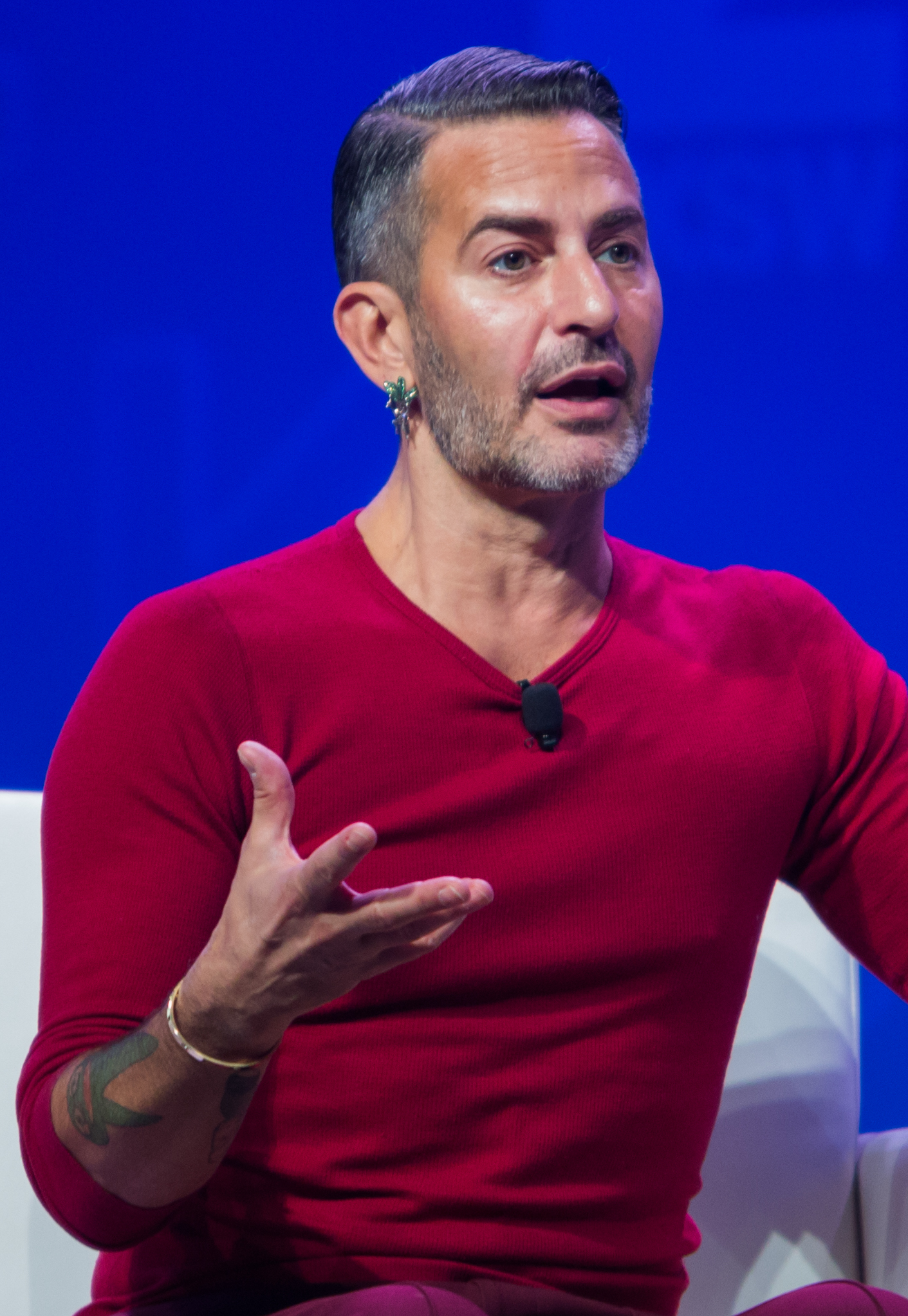
Todrick Hall (left, pictured in 2019) and fashion designer Marc Jacobs (right, pictured in 2017) are guest judges.

The pairs get acquainted and begin to collaborate. RuPaul returns to the workroom to meet with each team, asking questions and offering advice. Before leaving, RuPaul reveals that each pair must also perform an interpretive dance on the main stage. The teams assemble their looks and rehearse choreography. On elimination day, the pairs make final preparations for the fashion show. Some of the Little Women cast members talk about their experiences as little people and their dislike for derogatory terms.

On the main stage, RuPaul welcomes fellow judges Michelle Visage and Ross Mathews, as well as guest judges Todrick Hall and Marc Jacobs. The pairs present their runway looks, then the "dream sequence" with interpretive dancing commences. The judges deliver their critiques, then RuPaul asks the contestants to say who they think should be eliminated from the competition. The judges deliberate while the pairs wait backstage, then share the results with the group. Naomi Smalls is declared the winner of the main challenge. Derrick Barry and Robbie Turner place in the bottom and face off in a lip-sync contest to "I Love It" (2012) by Icona Pop. Derrick Barry wins the lip-sync and Robbie Turner is eliminated from the competition.

== Production and broadcast ==
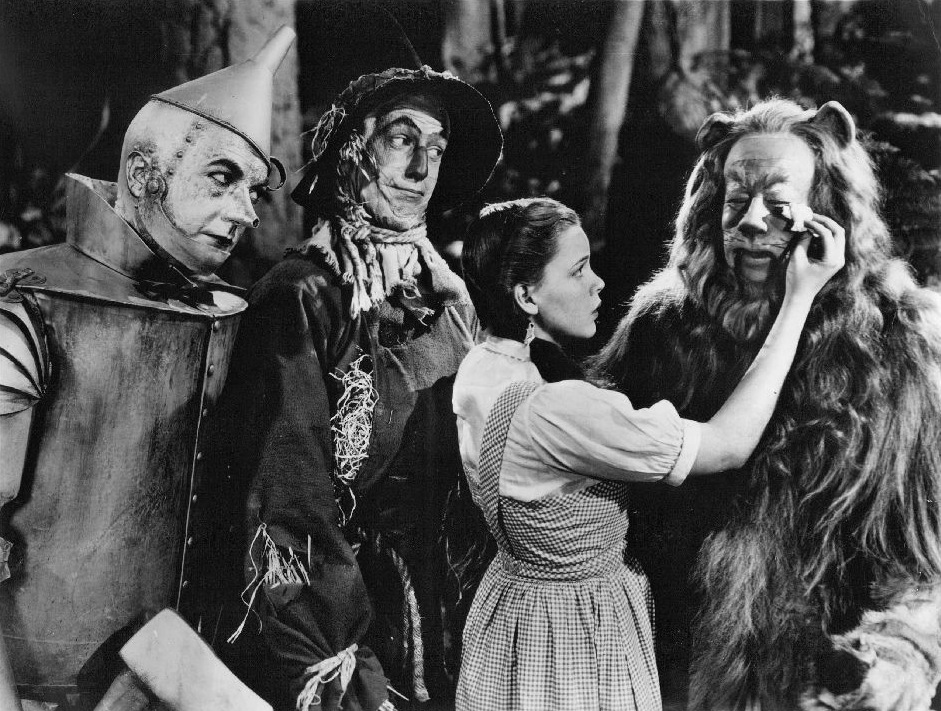
For the episode's main challenge, contestants are tasked with giving makeovers based on characters from The Wizard of Oz; pictured is a publicity photo of American entertainers (left to right) Jack Haley as the Tin Woodman, Ray Bolger as The Scarecrow, Judy Garland as Dorothy Gale, and Bert Lahr as the Cowardly Lion, promoting the 1966 CBS broadcast of the 1939 MGM feature film The Wizard of Oz.

The episode originally aired on April 11, 2016. Christy McGinity Gibel and Terra Jolé are among the Little Women cast members who receive makeovers. Tonya later appeared at RuPaul's DragCon LA.

=== Fashion ===
Chi Chi DeVayne and Ti Ti DeVayne wear matching light blue outfits and carry baskets. Bob the Drag Queen and Rob the Faux Queen have white outfits and red hair. Naomi Smalls and Jazzy Jems have short blonde wigs. Derrick Barry and Terra Barry wear similar silver outfits. Robbie Turner and Hedda Turner have similar brown outfits, blonde wigs, and crowns. Thorgy Thor and Thorgeous have similar green outfits, sunglasses, and green wigs. Kim Chi and Miso Chi have black-and-white outfits and carry brooms.

== Reception ==
Oliver Sava of The A.V. Club gave the episode a rating of 'A-'. Brian Moylan of Vulture rated the episode three out of five stars . John Walker of BK Mag said Robbie Turner "made the fatal mistake of removing her wig mid-performance, so it was her turn to go". Kevin O'Keeffe ranked the "I Love It" performance number 93 in INTO Magazine's "definitive ranking" of the show's lip-sync contests to date. Sam Brooks ranked the contest number 124 in The Spinoff's "definitive ranking" of the show's 162 lip-syncs to date.

== See also ==
- Adaptations of The Wonderful Wizard of Oz
- Cultural depictions of dwarfism
