= Corsicana, Texas =

City in the United States

- City
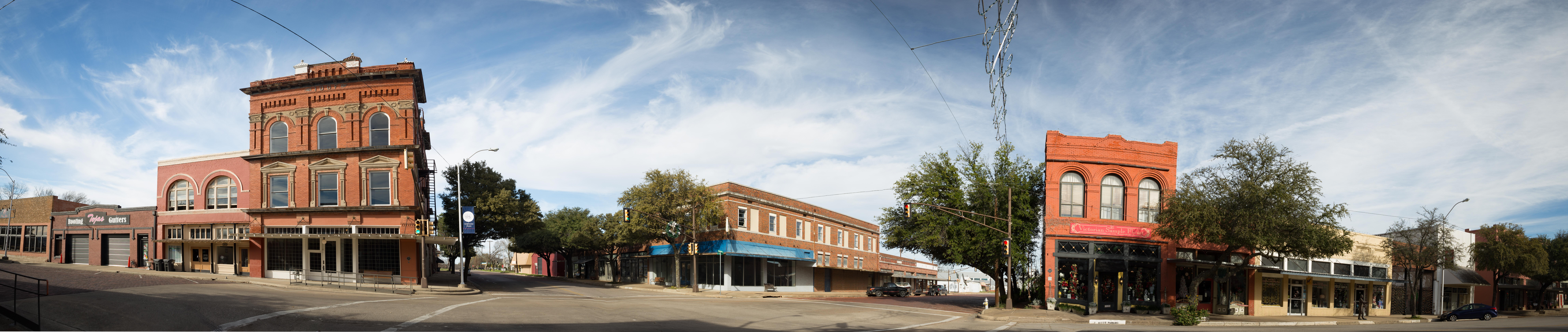
- Downtown Corsicana Texas
- Nickname: "903 Can, Tx "
- Motto: "Live, work, play!"
- Location within Navarro County and Texas
- Coordinates: 32°05′53″N 96°29′10″W
- Country: United States
- State: Texas
- County: Navarro

Government
  - Type: Council–manager

Area
  - Total: 24.00 sq mi (62.17 km^{2})
  - Land: 22.98 sq mi (59.53 km^{2})
  - Water: 1.02 sq mi (2.64 km^{2})
- Elevation: 423 ft (129 m)

Population (2020)
  - Total: 25,109
  - Density: 1,092/sq mi (421.8/km^{2})
- Time zone: UTC-6 (Central (CST))
  - Summer (DST): UTC-5 (CDT)
- ZIP codes: 75109, 75110, 75151
- Area code: 903/430
- FIPS code: 48-17060
- GNIS feature ID: 2410235
- Website: cityofcorsicana.com

Corsicana is a city in and the county seat of Navarro County, Texas, United States. Corsicana is part of the Dallas–Fort Worth metroplex and is located on Interstate 45, 50 mi (80 km) southeast of Dallas. Its population was 25,109 at the 2020 census. Corsicana is considered an important agribusiness center.

== History ==
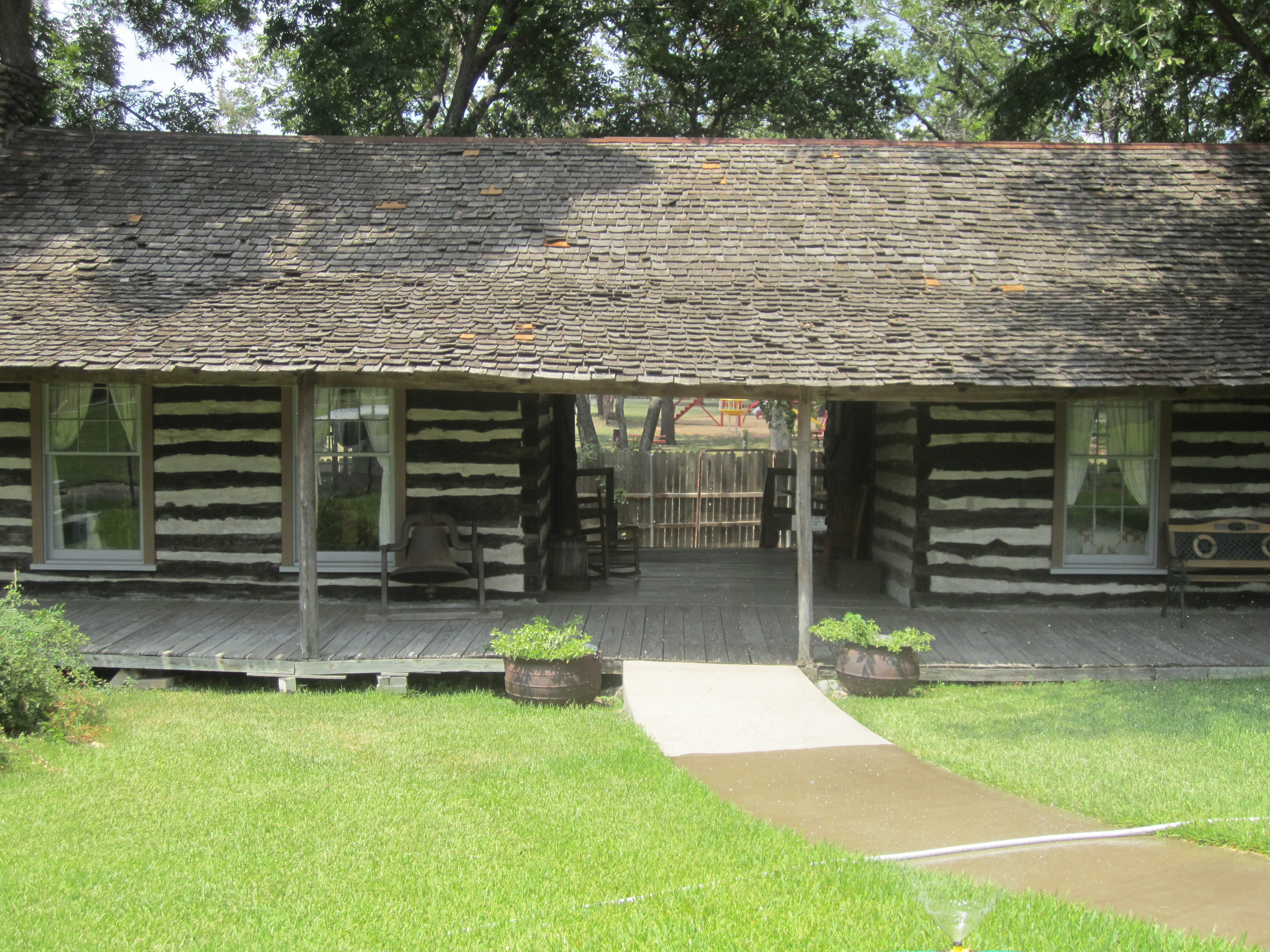
Pioneer Village in Beauford H. Jester Park in Corsicana

Founded in 1848, Corsicana was named by José Antonio Navarro after the Mediterranean island of Corsica, the birthplace of his father. He had died when Navarro and his many siblings were young. The first school opened shortly afterwards in 1849.

Women's groups have had a strong role throughout the history of the city. They established the Corsicana Female Literary Institute, a school that operated from 1857 through 1870. The first public library in Corsicana opened in 1901 by effort of the women's clubs of the city. A 1905 library matching gift by Andrew Carnegie gave the library a permanent home and its first full-time, professionally trained librarian. The library today is housed in a dedicated building downtown and boasts more than 52,283 books, 6,306 audio materials, 783 video materials, and 122 serial subscriptions.

The Corsicana YMCA was founded in 1884, and has grown with patron funding. In its earliest days, it was supported by George Taylor Jester (1847–1922), a wealthy dry-goods and cotton distributor, banker, store clerk and politician. He served as lieutenant governor of Texas (1895–1899), and his son Beauford H. Jester served as governor (1947–1949).

Oil was accidentally discovered in June, 1894, by the American Well and Prospecting Company, hired by the Corsicana Water Development Company, when oil seeped into an artesian well being drilled within the city limits. In October 1895, the first commercial oil well was drilled by the Corsicana Oil Development Company, founded by Ralph Beaton, H.G. Damon, and John Davidson. It was the first commercially significant oilfield find in Texas. A refinery was in operation by January 1899, through the efforts of Joseph S. Cullinan. The Powell oil field was discovered in 1900, a few miles east of Corsicana. Rotary drilling, used to drill water wells, was introduced to the oil industry by M.C. Baker and C.E. Baker, with tools manufactured by the American Well and Prospecting machine shop, owned by N.G. Johnson, E.H. Akin, and Charles Rittersbacker.

During World War II, an airman flying school called Corsicana Air Field, now known as C. David Campbell Field, trained thousands of pilots.

== Geography ==
According to the United States Census Bureau, the city has a total area of 21.7 square miles (56 km^{2}), of which 1.0 square mile (2.6 km^{2}) is covered by water.

Corsicana is home to the Lake Halbert dam and recreational park, and is less than 15 mi (24 km) from Richland Chambers Reservoir, with recreational fishing, public boat ramps, and 330 mi (530 km) of tree-lined and green shorelines. Richland Chambers Reservoir is the third-largest lake by surface area and the eighth-largest reservoir by water volume in Texas.

=== Climate ===
Corsicana has a moderate humid subtropical climate. The range of low-high average temperatures in January, April, July, and October is 34/55, 53/75, 73/95, and 55/79 °F, respectively.

Corsicana rainfall averages 42.23 inches (1,073 mm) per year. Leafy oak, pecan, magnolia, and walnut trees are common, and grasses grow tall and green. Rain is fairly evenly distributed throughout the year, with small, wetter peaks in May and October.

Climate data for Corsicana, TX 1991–2020, extremes 1893–present
Month	Jan	Feb	Mar	Apr	May	Jun	Jul	Aug	Sep	Oct	Nov	Dec	Year
Record high °F (°C)	89 (32)	96 (36)	95 (35)	99 (37)	104 (40)	108 (42)	113 (45)	112 (44)	112 (44)	101 (38)	91 (33)	90 (32)	113 (45)
Mean daily maximum °F (°C)	57.7 (14.3)	62.0 (16.7)	68.7 (20.4)	76.1 (24.5)	83.0 (28.3)	90.5 (32.5)	94.9 (34.9)	96.0 (35.6)	90.0 (32.2)	79.5 (26.4)	67.7 (19.8)	59.9 (15.5)	77.4 (25.2)
Mean daily minimum °F (°C)	35.2 (1.8)	39.3 (4.1)	46.1 (7.8)	53.0 (11.7)	62.9 (17.2)	70.7 (21.5)	74.0 (23.3)	73.6 (23.1)	66.6 (19.2)	55.1 (12.8)	45.0 (7.2)	37.6 (3.1)	55.2 (12.9)
Record low °F (°C)	−5 (−21)	−4 (−20)	12 (−11)	29 (−2)	31 (−1)	41 (5)	56 (13)	53 (12)	41 (5)	27 (−3)	19 (−7)	−1 (−18)	−5 (−21)
Average precipitation inches (mm)	3.08 (78)	3.27 (83)	4.00 (102)	4.03 (102)	4.28 (109)	3.77 (96)	2.11 (54)	2.48 (63)	3.35 (85)	4.99 (127)	3.20 (81)	3.67 (93)	42.23 (1,073)
Average snowfall inches (cm)	0.4 (1.0)	0.0 (0.0)	0.0 (0.0)	0.0 (0.0)	0.0 (0.0)	0.0 (0.0)	0.0 (0.0)	0.0 (0.0)	0.0 (0.0)	0.0 (0.0)	0.0 (0.0)	trace	0.7 (1.8)
Average precipitation days (≥ 0.01 in)	7	8	9	7	8	7	5	5	6	7	7	8	82
Average snowy days (≥ 0.1 in)	0.0	0.0	0.0	0.0	0.0	0.0	0.0	0.0	0.0	0.0	0.0	0.0	0.0
Source: NWS Nowdata for Corsicana (Dallas/Fort Worth Area)

== Demographics ==
Historical population
Census	Pop.	Note	%±
1870	80		—
1880	3,373		4,116.3%
1890	6,285		86.3%
1900	9,313		48.2%
1910	9,749		4.7%
1920	11,356		16.5%
1930	15,202		33.9%
1940	15,232		0.2%
1950	19,211		26.1%
1960	20,344		5.9%
1970	19,972		−1.8%
1980	21,712		8.7%
1990	22,911		5.5%
2000	24,485		6.9%
2010	23,770		−2.9%
2020	25,109		5.6%
U.S. Decennial Census

=== Racial and ethnic composition ===
Corsicana city, Texas – Racial and ethnic composition Note: the US Census treats Hispanic/Latino as an ethnic category. This table excludes Latinos from the racial categories and assigns them to a separate category. Hispanics/Latinos may be of any race.
Race / Ethnicity (NH = Non-Hispanic)	Pop 2000	Pop 2010	Pop 2020	% 2000	% 2010	% 2020
White alone (NH)	12,687	10,707	9,738	51.82%	45.04%	38.78%
Black or African American alone (NH)	5,727	4,874	4,782	23.39%	20.50%	19.04%
Native American or Alaska Native alone (NH)	67	63	47	0.27%	0.27%	0.19%
Asian alone (NH)	139	160	245	0.57%	0.67%	0.98%
Native Hawaiian or Pacific Islander alone (NH)	108	303	664	0.44%	1.27%	2.64%
Other race alone (NH)	13	23	80	0.05%	0.10%	0.32%
Mixed race or Multiracial (NH)	242	249	717	0.99%	1.05%	2.86%
Hispanic or Latino (any race)	5,502	7,391	8,836	22.47%	31.09%	35.19%
Total	24,485	23,770	25,109	100.00%	100.00%	100.00%

=== 2020 census ===
As of the 2020 census, Corsicana had 25,109 people, 8,752 households, and 5,643 families residing in the city. The median age was 34.1 years. 26.8% of residents were under the age of 18 and 15.3% of residents were 65 years of age or older. For every 100 females there were 93.3 males, and for every 100 females age 18 and over there were 89.3 males age 18 and over.

96.8% of residents lived in urban areas, while 3.2% lived in rural areas.

There were 8,752 households in Corsicana, of which 37.0% had children under the age of 18 living in them. Of all households, 42.0% were married-couple households, 17.9% were households with a male householder and no spouse or partner present, and 33.2% were households with a female householder and no spouse or partner present. About 27.8% of all households were made up of individuals and 12.6% had someone living alone who was 65 years of age or older.

There were 9,661 housing units, of which 9.4% were vacant. Among occupied housing units, 54.3% were owner-occupied and 45.7% were renter-occupied. The homeowner vacancy rate was 1.3% and the rental vacancy rate was 8.4%.

Racial composition as of the 2020 census (NH = Non-Hispanic) (Note: Note: the US Census treats Hispanic/Latino as an ethnic category. This table excludes Latinos from the racial categories and assigns them to a separate category. Hispanics/Latinos can be of any race.)
Race	Number	Percent
White	11,268	44.9%
Black or African American	4,885	19.5%
American Indian and Alaska Native	234	0.9%
Asian	248	1.0%
Native Hawaiian and Other Pacific Islander	664	2.6%
Some other race	4,106	16.4%
Two or more races	3,704	14.8%

=== 2010 census ===
As of the census of 2010, 23,770 people, 8,490 households, and 5,966 families were residing in the city. The population density was 1,048 inhabitants per square mile (405/km^{2}). The 9,491 housing units averaged 461 per square mile (178/km^{2}). The racial makeup of the city was 58.1% White, 20.9% African American, 0.6% Native American, 0.7% Asian, 1.3% Pacific Islander, 16% from other races, and 2.4% from two or more races. Hispanics or Latinos of any race were 31.1% of the population.

Of the 8,490 households, 28.8% had children under 18 living with them in 2010, 48.6% were married couples living together, 15.0% had a female householder with no husband present, and 31.9% were not families. About 27.3% of all households were made up of individuals, and 13.7% had someone living alone who was 65 or older. The average household size was 2.64, and the average family size was 3.21.

In the city, the population was distributed as 27.3% under 18, 12.6% from 18 to 24, 26.6% from 25 to 44, 18.6% from 45 to 64, and 15.0% who were 65 or older. The median age was 32 years. For every 100 females, there were 94.2 males. For every 100 females age 18 and over, there were 89.9 males.

The median income for a household in the city was $27,203, and for a family was $33,078. Males had a median income of $27,516 versus $19,844 for females. The per capita income for the city was $14,001. About 17.4% of families and 22.3% of the population were below the poverty line, including 29.4% of those under age 18 and 15.1% of those age 65 or over.

The housing stock in 2007 consisted of 12,313 houses and condominiums. About two-thirds were owner-occupied, and one-third rented. The median price asked for vacant for-sale houses and condos in 2007 was $87,955. The median amount of real estate property taxes paid for housing units in 2007 was $912.

== Arts and entertainment ==
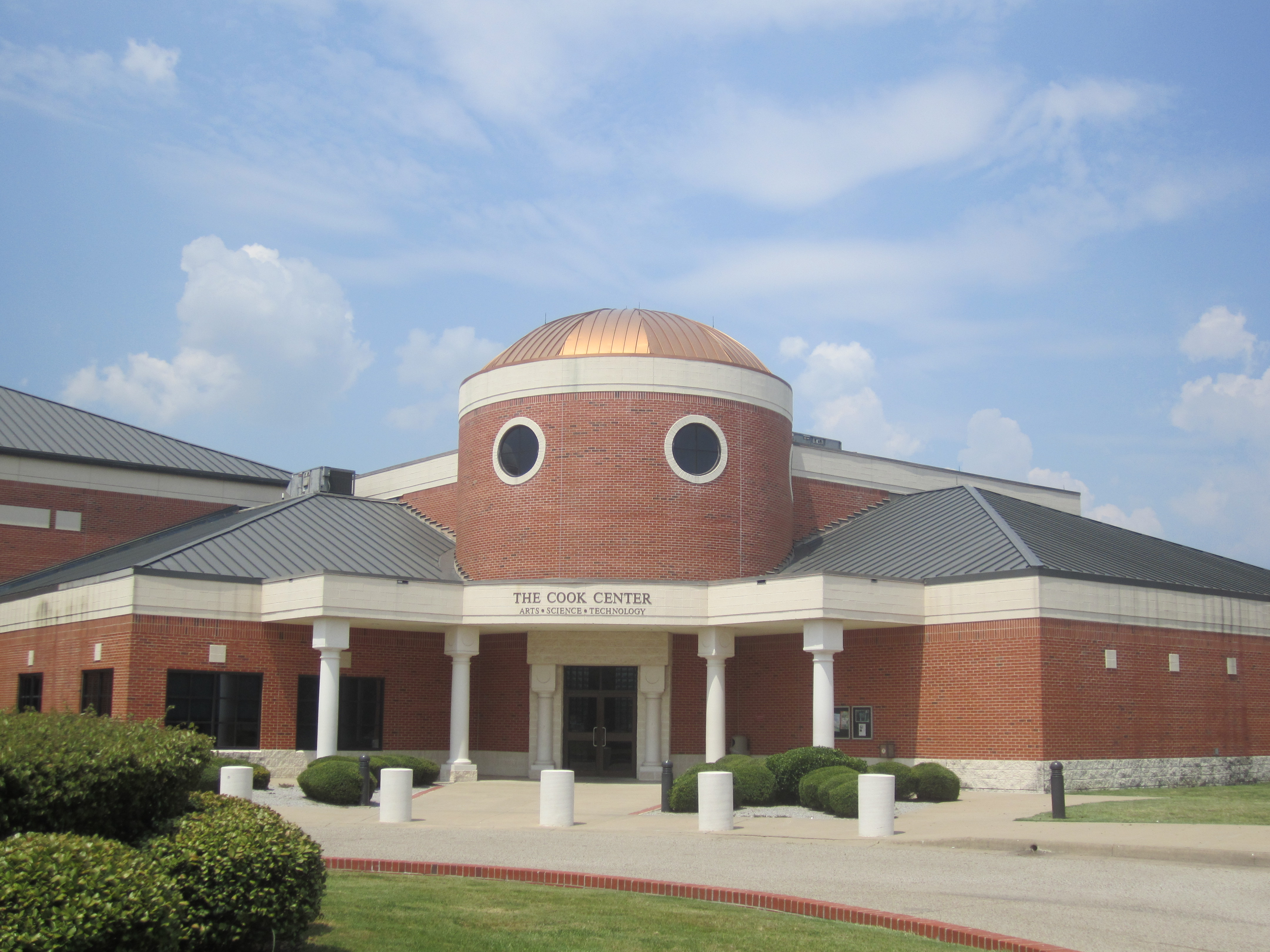
Cook Center on the Navarro College campus

Today's downtown supports an active performing-arts community, with year-round live theater, art exhibits, and music performances in a corner of downtown anchored by the Warehouse Living Arts Center and the Palace Theater. Also, an art contest was started in 2018. Downtown also features the historic State National Bank building (built in 1926), several coffeeshops and eateries, an art gallery, several bric-à-brac outlets, and many brick-faced storefronts of historical interest.

A green park a short walk from the county courthouse downtown has meandering creeks and walking, jogging, and biking trails. Other amenities include lighted tennis courts, a children's play area with a retired fire truck, spray park, and designated skate area. At one end of the community park is the town YMCA, with a year-round indoor pool, basketball courts, cardio- and free-weight equipment, and instructor-led fitness workshops.

The town has several museums: Pioneer Village, located by Jester Park, offers reconstructed buildings and artifacts from the early historical period of the area. A museum is dedicated to Lefty Frizzell, a Nashville singer born in town during the late 1920s.

The Cook Education Center, located on the Navarro College campus, is a multifaceted venue offering event space, gift shop, a planetarium, Civil War museum, and Western Art gallery. The planetarium is among the largest in Texas, featuring a 60-foot (18 m) dome and 200 seats. The planetarium offers narrated astronomical shows and 70 mm film for nominal admission.

The center is also home to the Pearce Collections Museum, which boasts a collection of Civil War memorabilia and a Western Art gallery featuring a number of renowned Western artists. The Cook Education Center hosts the annual Navarro College Foundation fundraiser Elegance, which benefits scholarship programs for Navarro College students. The Navarro College Performing Arts Department stages several musical recitals and two staged plays a year at the Dawson Auditorium on the west side of town.

== Government and infrastructure ==
The Texas Youth Commission and later the Texas Department of Juvenile Justice formerly operated the Corsicana Residential Treatment Center in the city.

== Economy ==
Oil City Iron Works, Inc., today a ductile and gray iron foundry, was started in 1866 to make parts for the owner's cotton gin. Wolf Brand Chili, a national brand named for the owner's pet wolf, Kaiser Bill, started in 1895 as a downtown by-the-bowl lunch wagon. Wolf Brand Chili was made in Corsicana until 1986. Corsicana is best known as the home of the Collin Street Bakery, which has been making fruitcakes since 1896.

Today's economy no longer relies on oil and gas. Major employers include Russell Stover Candies and Collin Street Bakery, Guardian Industries (glass), Corsicana Bedding, and Kohl's distribution centers, Navarro Regional hospital (160+ beds), Trinity/Mother Francis Health System, and the Texas State Home. There are several 24/7 pharmacies, grocery stores and chain department stores scattered about the town. College Park Mall is an enclosed shopping mall that primarily houses a clothing store.

Corsicana was the home of Tradewest, a coin-arcade and video game company founded in 1986. Tradewest was known for publishing such Nintendo Entertainment System classics as "Double Dragon" and "Battletoads". Tradewest was acquired by WMS Industries in 1994, becoming Williams Entertainment briefly before becoming Midway Home Entertainment in 1996 after the spin-off of Midway Games. The Corsicana offices were closed by Midway in late 2002.

== Schools ==
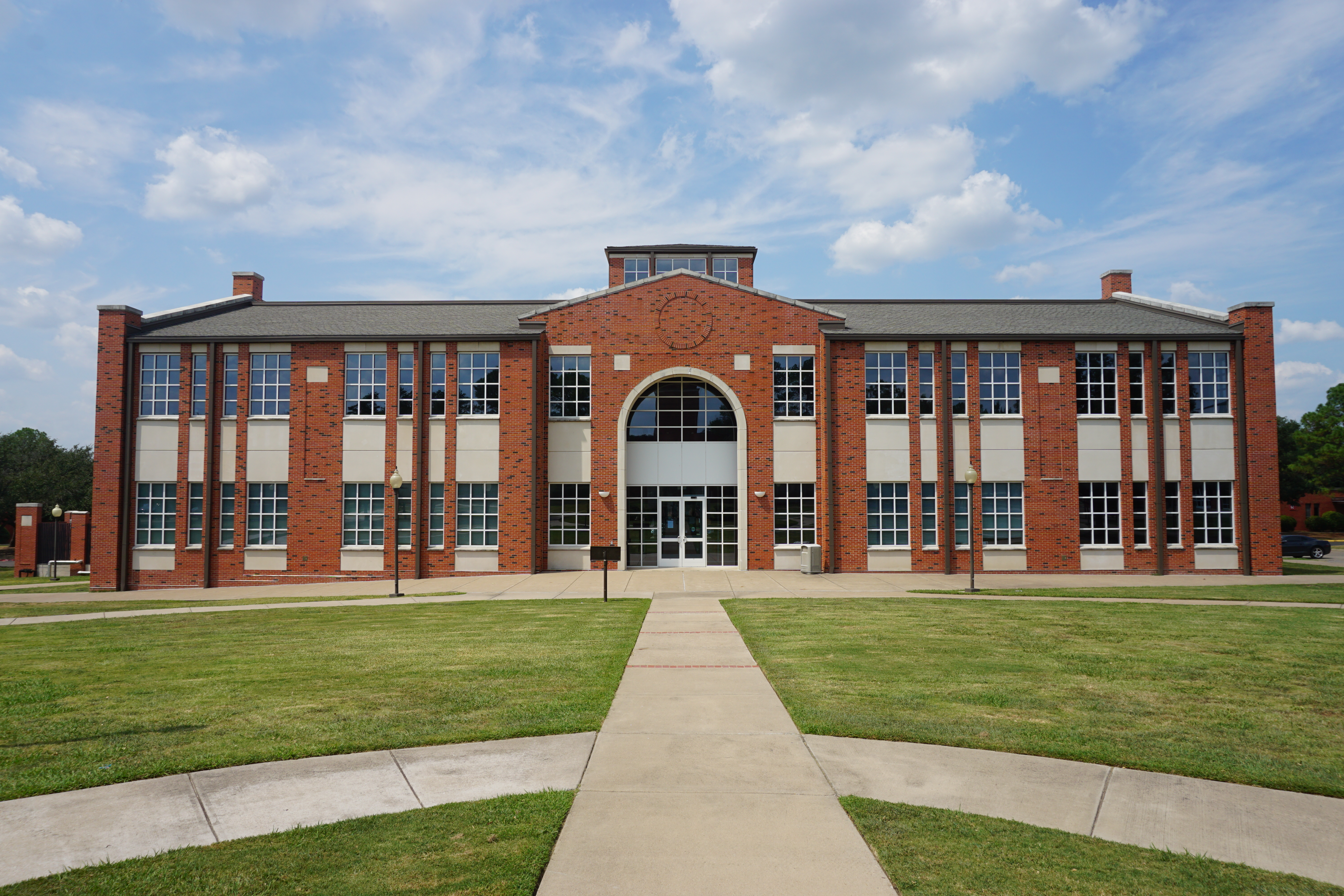
The Richard M. Sanchez Library at Navarro College

Corsicana is home to Navarro College, which offers associate degrees and is also a satellite facility of Texas A&M University-Commerce, through which students can receive bachelor's and graduate degrees. Navarro College came to international prominence in 2020 owing to its dominant coed cheerleading team, which was featured that year in the Netflix docuseries Cheer. centering on the team's preparation for the National Cheerleaders Association national championships in Daytona Beach, Florida. The cheerleading squad is currently coached by Monica Aldama, who, since 2000, has led the Bulldogs to 14 championships in their division, as well as five "Grand National" designations (for the highest overall score in competition that year).

The Corsicana Independent School District (CISD) has an enrollment over 6,500 students. Five CISD schools have been lauded by the Texas Education Agency (TEA): Bowie, Fannin, Carroll, and Navarro Elementary Schools and Drane Intermediate School all achieved "recognized" status.

Collins Middle School and Corsicana High School were rated "academically acceptable" by the TEA. The CISD received Academically Acceptable status from the state.

Corsicana also has one private school, James L. Collins Catholic School, for kindergarten through eighth grade. Founded in 1953 by a bequest from its namesake benefactor, the school today has an enrollment of 270 students.

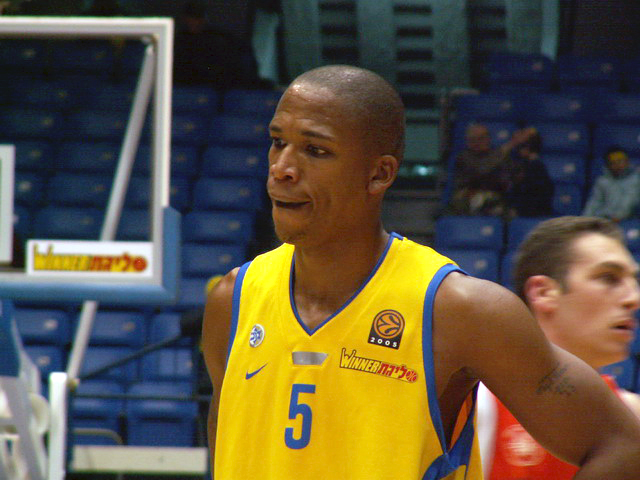
Maceo Demond Baston

== Notable people ==
- James B. Adams, lawyer, Texas legislator, director of the Federal Bureau of Investigation
- Monica Aldama, cheerleading coach
- Aaron Allston, science-fiction novelist
- Maceo Baston, professional basketball player
- Mary Brian, silent film era movie star (1906–2002)
- Danny Colbert, football player
- Cottrell Laurence Dellums, organizer and official of the Brotherhood of Sleeping Car Porters (1900–1989)
- Lefty Frizzell, Country Music Hall of Fame singer and songwriter (1928–1975)
- Tyree Glenn, trombone player, (1912–1974)
- Allyn Gordon, watercolor artist (1909–1978)
- John Hardee, jazz saxophonist (1918–1984)
- Julie Haus, a.k.a. Julie Ann Hoeinghaus, fashion designer
- Skip Hicks, former NFL running back for the Washington Redskins
- Omarius Hines, NFL wide receiver for the Baltimore Ravens
- V. E. Howard, Church of Christ clergyman, founder of radio International Gospel Hour; married in Corsicana in 1931
- Herschel Ray Jacobs (American Football), NFL Denver Broncos & Miami Dolphins 1963-1969
- Beauford Jester, governor of Texas 1947–1949, (1893–1949)
- Wesley Johnson, basketball player in the NBA.
- John Larry Kelly, Jr., scientist and mathematician (1923–1965)
- Danzell Lee, football player
- Danieal Manning, NFL defensive back for the Houston Texans
- Roger Q. Mills, U.S. Senator (1892-1899), U.S. Congressional Representative (1873-1892), and Chairman of the House Ways and Means Committee (1887-1889)
- James C. Neill, politician, soldier in the Texas Revolution, Alamo commander
- David "Fathead" Newman, jazz saxophonist (1933–2009)
- Shirlene Pearson, Little Women: Atlanta star
- Billy Joe Shaver, Texas Country Music Hall of Fame singer and songwriter
- Martha Simkins, painter
- Spice 1, rapper
- Herold J. Weiler (1886–1945), United States Army officer who served as Chief of the National Guard Bureau 1935-36
- Cameron Todd Willingham, controversially convicted of triple murder and arson; executed (1968–2004)
- Louis Vasquez, NFL Guard, San Diego Chargers, Denver Broncos (Super Bowl)
- David Hawthorne, NFL linebacker, Seattle Seahawks, New Orleans Saints, Buffalo Bills
- Nic Shimonek, NCAA and NFL Quarterback, Texas Tech, Los Angeles Chargers
