= Terra Jolé =

American television personality

- Born: Terra Jolé Odmark; May 25, 1980 (age 46); Comal County, Texas
- Occupation: Television personality
- Height: 4 ft 2 in (127 cm)
- Spouse: Joe Gnoffo (m. 2015)
- Children: 3

Terra Jolé Odmark (born May 25, 1980) is an American reality television personality known for Little Women: LA and its spinoffs and Dancing with the Stars. She stands at 4 ft 2 in (127 cm) as a person with dwarfism.

== Career ==
Jolé is part of the cast and one of the executive producers of the Lifetime television shows Little Women: LA and Terra's Little Family. Both shows began in 2014. She also works as executive producer of spinoffs Little Women: ATL and Little Women: NY and Little Women: Dallas. She is a member of the Producers Guild of America.

In 2016, Jolé released a full album of children's songs titled Penny's Playlist. The project was dedicated to her daughter.

Jolé launched MiniMama.com, a website that features original content for mothers and children.

On August 30, 2016, Jolé was announced as one of the celebrities who would take part in season 23 of Dancing with the Stars. Her professional partner was Sasha Farber. The couple were eliminated in Week 10 of the competition, after receiving two perfect scores and therefore finished in fifth place.

== Personal life ==
In 1998, Jolé graduated from Douglas MacArthur High School in San Antonio, Texas.

She resides in Los Angeles, California and is married to fellow Little Women: LA star Joe Gnoffo. On March 16, 2015, the couple had a daughter named Penelope Charlevoix Gnoffo. On August 1, 2016, their son, Grayson Vincent D'Artagnan Gnoffo, was born. On March 11, 2020, their second daughter, Magnolia August, was born.

Jolé is a supporter of the non-profit organization Forte Animal Rescue. She is passionate about animals and has adopted and cared for dozens of pets without homes over the years.

== Filmography ==
=== Television ===
Year	Title	Role	Notes
2014–2019	Little Women: LA	Herself	Creator and Executive Producer Main Cast (Seasons 1–8)
2015–2016	Little Women LA: Terra's Little Family	Herself	Executive Producer
2016	Rupaul's Drag Race	Herself	Season 8, Episode 6
2016	Dancing with the Stars	Dancer	Eliminated 9th (season 23)
2019	Hollywood Medium with Tyler Henry	Herself	Season 4, Episode 2
2021	Rugrats		Voice

=== Film ===
Year	Title	Role	Notes
1998	Jerry Springer	Terra	Episode: Invasion of the little people part 2
2001	My First Day		
2008	Midgets vs. Mascots	Little person	
2010	Jackass 3D	Herself	Guest appearance
2014	The Hungover Games	Teddy	

== Books ==
- Fierce at Four Foot Two (2017)
