= International Dwarf Fashion Show =

Nonprofit dwarifsm activism group

- Founded: New York City, U.S. (2014)
- Founders: Creative Business House & Donnons Leur Une Chance
- Location: New York City, Paris, Berlin
- Key people: Myriam Chalek (founder)
- Website: www.thedwarfashionshow.com

The International Dwarf Fashion Show, also known as The National Dwarf Fashion Show, is a non-profit organization which seeks to empower and raise awareness to people living with dwarfism by putting on fashion shows consisting entirely of people living with dwarfism. They are best known for their contribution to fashion week in Paris, New York and Berlin.

== History ==
After seeing a dwarf woman struggling to find appropriate clothes, CEO of CBH Model Management Myriam Chalek decided she wanted to raise awareness about achondroplasia (a form of dwarfism) by exposing the fashion and modeling industry to the unexplored market of dwarfism.

Chalek and the nonprofit Donnons Leur Une Chance founded The Dwarf Fashion Show, consisting entirely of dwarf models. The Dwarf Fashion Show took part in Paris's annual fashion week and received extensive media coverage.

In 2015, due to the heightened success of The Dwarf Fashion Show, Chalek took what was supposed to be a single event and created the non-profit The International Dwarf Fashion show.

The mission of the International Dwarf Fashion Show is "to reverse the discriminatory diktats of beauty and to give the opportunity to little people to express themselves by bringing an innovative perspective to the fashion industry. Also, while giving people opportunity, they also highly edited photos of people to make their image not look like them anymore.

== Involvement in Fashion Weeks ==
- Paris Fashion Week, September 27, 2014: In collaboration with the French non profit Donnons leur une chance association, CBH model management and Creative Business House, the International Dwarf Fashion Show makes its debut at the Pavillon Gariel during Paris Fashion Week.
- New York Fashion Week, February 12, 2015: The International Dwarf Fashion Show opened as part of New York City Fashion Week and featured Jordanna James, dancer of Miley Cyrus and celebrity cast of the TV show Little Women New York in a "Dollar Dress" made entirely of real $100 bills. Also walking was Misty Irwin, a celebrity guest of Little Women New York.
- Berlin Fashion Week, July 11, 2015: Berlin based fashion designer Sema Gedik presented a street wear collection called "Auf Augenhöhe" ("At Eyelevel") for people with dwarfism. She credits her cousin (who has achondroplasia) as a source of inspiration.
- Paris Fashion Week, October 2, 2015: Fifteen dwarfin models showing off sparkly cocktail and evening dresses walked the runway at the Grand Room at the French Ministry of Culture as part of a government supportive initiative to promote alternative standards of beauty in an industry than values tall and thin.
- Tokyo Fashion Week, October 26, 2016: The International Dwarf Fashion Show expands to Asia. Little women models from the US, Britain walk the runway with little Japanese women during the Amazon Fashion Week held in Shibuya.
- Arab Fashion Week: After overcoming both logistical issues and various rumors the International Dwarf Fashion Show took part in Arab Fashion week. Seven models walked the runway in the United Arab Emirates city of Dubai in order to raise awareness for the need for more inclusivity in the fashion industry.

A special show at the White House to commemorate the passing of the Americans with Disabilities Act is being planned.
