= Myriam Chalek =

French fashion designer and entrepreneur

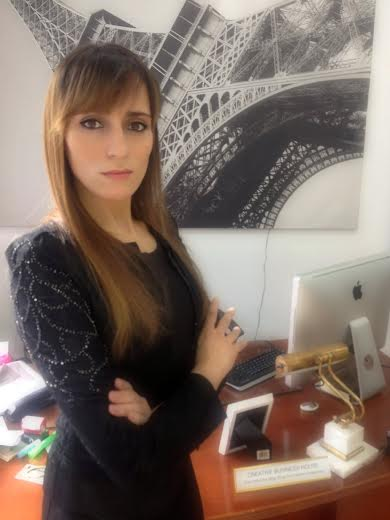
- Occupation: Fashion Designer
- Organization(s): Creative Business House, Donnons Leur Une Chance & American Wardrobe
- Known for: International Dwarf Fashion Show

Myriam Chalek is a French fashion designer, entrepreneur, and diversity and inclusion advocate. She is known for putting on alternative fashion shows meant to challenge the idea of beauty and empower people living with disabilities.

== Early life and education ==
Chalek was born in France and raised in Paris, in the suburbs of Seine-Saint-Denis. After secondary school, she enrolled at Paris V Descartes Law School, where she participated in a student exchange program with the University of Laval. She then returned to France and graduated with a master's degree in international business law from the University of Paris.

== Career ==
After graduating with her Masters of Law, Chalek worked for a number of organizations before ultimately deciding to become an entrepreneur.

Chalek traveled to New York on an F1 student visa and was offered a full-time position by the director of the school as a business professor. Through her work at the business institute and New York's fashion industry, she met various designers and learned about the product marketing process that designers work through. Chalek saw an opportunity to guide young designers in the process of product marketing and development combined with intellectual property law which led to the start of her first company, Creative Business House.

As her business grew, Chalek found that various event organizations were lacking in skills to support her clients, so she created an event company, White Tie Affairs, to work with Creative Business House clients. Soon after, the philanthropic organization Association Let's Give a Chance, offered her the position of vice president, which she accepted making her one of its main benefactor partners. A year later, as part of this partnership, she launched "a physical annex in New York City under the name Do Not Be Cheap."

In April, 2018, Chalek traveled to Cambodia with the non-profit organization "Donnons Leur Une Chance" to distribute tools, sewing machines, and 1000 chickens to families living in poverty.

== International Dwarf Fashion Show ==
While shopping for clothes, Chalek encountered a woman with dwarfism struggling to find clothing in the children's section. Chalek realized that people living with dwarfism, through no fault of their own, struggled to obtain clothing that fit often needing to go to a tailor to have apparel custom-made; shop in the children's department of stores, make their own clothes, or alter oversized clothing.

Chalek decided to leverage her years working in the fashion industry to challenge the discrimination and idea of beauty and what it means to be beautiful. Utilizing her network within the fashion industry and driven by her need of philanthropy, Chalek created The National Dwarf Fashion Show.

In September 2014 The National Dwarf Fashion Show had its debut performance at the Pavillon Gabriel as part of Paris's annual Fashion week. The event put the spotlight on dwarfism and brought attention to the existing discriminations within the fashion industry. The event received press coverage and appealed to the Lifetime network which subsequently produced the reality show Little Women New York. A collaboration with Chalek ensued and resulted in a New York Fashion Week show featuring Jordanna James of Little Women New York.

In 2015, Berlin based fashion designer Sema Gedik learned about Chalek's alternative fashion shows that were parts of Fashion Week in major cities like Tokyo (Paris and New York). Inspired by the concept, Gedik held a small fashion show as a tribute to her cousin who was also living with dwarfism.

Also in 2015, the first international dwarf fashion show debuted in Paris at its Fashion Week, leading to an invitation to the French Ministry of Culture which hoped to support and promote alternative standards of beauty in an industry where the values of tall and thin are the norm.

Since its inception. The International Dwarf Fashion Show has taken part in fashion weeks in major cities including Tokyo and Dubai.

== Blind Fashion Show ==
Following the success of the Dwarf Fashion Shows, Chalek, wanting to continue to orchestrate and plan activist fashion shows to raise awareness and empower other marginalized groups. In February 2016, Chalek closed New York Fashion Week with a show highlighting the visually impaired community with the first-ever fashion show consisting of all blind models. Although Chalek encountered some controversy as one of the criteria for models to apply was to walk without their guide dogs or canes, the visually impaired community was positively receptive to the show.

After the success of the New York's Fashion week show, Chalek hosted a second blind fashion Show at the Pavillon Vendome as part of Paris's 2016 Fashion Week. The Show featured blind and visually impaired models Among them was 2012 Mrs. America and Mrs. World pageant winner, April Lufriu who walked the runway with her daughter Savannah both who currently live with Retinitis Pigmentosa.

== #MeToo Movement ==
Continuing her fashion world activism, Chalek sought to raise awareness of sexual abuse, combining her efforts with the MeToo movement. On February 9, 2018 the #MeToo Fashion Show took place at The Green Room 42, in Manhattan. Chalek used her own American Wardrobe label as a platform to benefit women. Eight models each survivors of rape, sexual harassment, child sexual abuse, groping and incest walked the runway wearing garments that represented their abuse. Each of the survivors walked accompanied by a male model wearing a pig mask which was an oblique reference to the #MeToo movement in France translated as #exposeyourpig. The male models were handcuffed to a chair as victims shared with the audience their experience as a victim of assault or/and sexual misconduct in “vivid and disturbing detail”. Among the survivors participating in this fashion show was Alicia Kozakiewiecz, a young woman who was abducted in 2002 near her Pittsburgh home.
