= Ms. Juicy Baby =

American TV personality

Ms. Juicy
- Born: Shirlene King Pearson; January 5, 1972 (age 54); Corsicana, Texas, U.S.
- Other name: The Queen of Atlanta
- Occupations: Radio host; television personality; entrepreneur
- Height: 4 ft 0 in (1.22 m)

Shirlene King Pearson (born January 5, 1972), better known as Ms. Juicy Baby, or simply Juicy, is an American television and radio personality, entertainer, actress, executive producer, and talent manager. She is best known for appearing on the Lifetime reality show, Little Women: Atlanta from 2016 to 2021.

== Life and career ==
Pearson was born and raised in Corsicana, Texas, where she attended Corsicana High School, and Navarro College, before graduating from DeVry University where she received her BA in Computer Information Systems.

While at a nightclub in Dallas, Pearson was discovered by theatrical producer Shelley Garrett, who approached her to be a leading role in his stage play Beauty Shop, in the replacement of Kym Whitley. Soon thereafter, she began traveling with Garrett, and appearing in his subsequent plays You Gonna Make Me Love Somebody Else and Doing The Right Thing With The Wrong Man, leading to her role as the Mayor in Fred Hammond's Christmas... Who Needs It.

In 2008, Pearson began her career in radio, regularly appearing on The Rickey Smiley Morning Show, and later making appearances on Smiley's sitcom, The Rickey Smiley Show. Pearson remained a full time personality until leaving the radio show in December 2019 after twelve years. Though the show's producers claimed her exit was a result of filming conflicts with Pearson's reality show, Little Women: Atlanta, Pearson asserted the real reason was because she was not offered a contract following the show's company switch.

She was a cast member and executive producer on the Lifetime reality television show Little Women: Atlanta. Pearson has stated she hopes Little Women: Atlanta "teaches and informs people about who little people are." From 2018 to 2022, Pearson appeared in the TNT series Claws, playing the recurring role of Tabitha throughout the show's duration alongside Niecy Nash.

On April 28, 2022, Pearson was hospitalized in the ICU amid suffering a stroke, which caused a brain bleed, resulting in her being put in a medically induced coma. On May 27, Pearson returned to social media, revealing she was recovering from memory loss (caused by the brain bleed) and in speech therapy.

== Filmography ==
Year	Title	Role	Notes
2012–2014	The Rickey Smiley Show	Receptionist; Juicy	Recurring role
2016–2021	Little Women: Atlanta	Herself	Recurring (season 1); Main cast (seasons 2–6) Executive producer (season 6)
2016–2018	Rickey Smiley For Real	Herself	Main cast (Seasons 3–5)
2016	The Real Housewives of Atlanta	Herself	Episode: "Who's Been Naughty, Who's Been Nice"; Cameo
2017	Hap and Leonard	Stella Goodhart	3 episodes
2018–2022	Claws	Tabitha	Recurring role
2020	Braxton Family Values	Herself	Episode: "Bachelorette Braxton Style"; Cameo
2022	Married to Medicine	Herself	Episode: "The Beauty Shop"; Cameo
2023	The Drone That Saved Christmas	Star	
2025	The Exotic Life of Dr. Ollie	Donna	
