= Oil City Iron Works, Inc. =

Oil City Iron Works, Inc

Oil City Iron Works
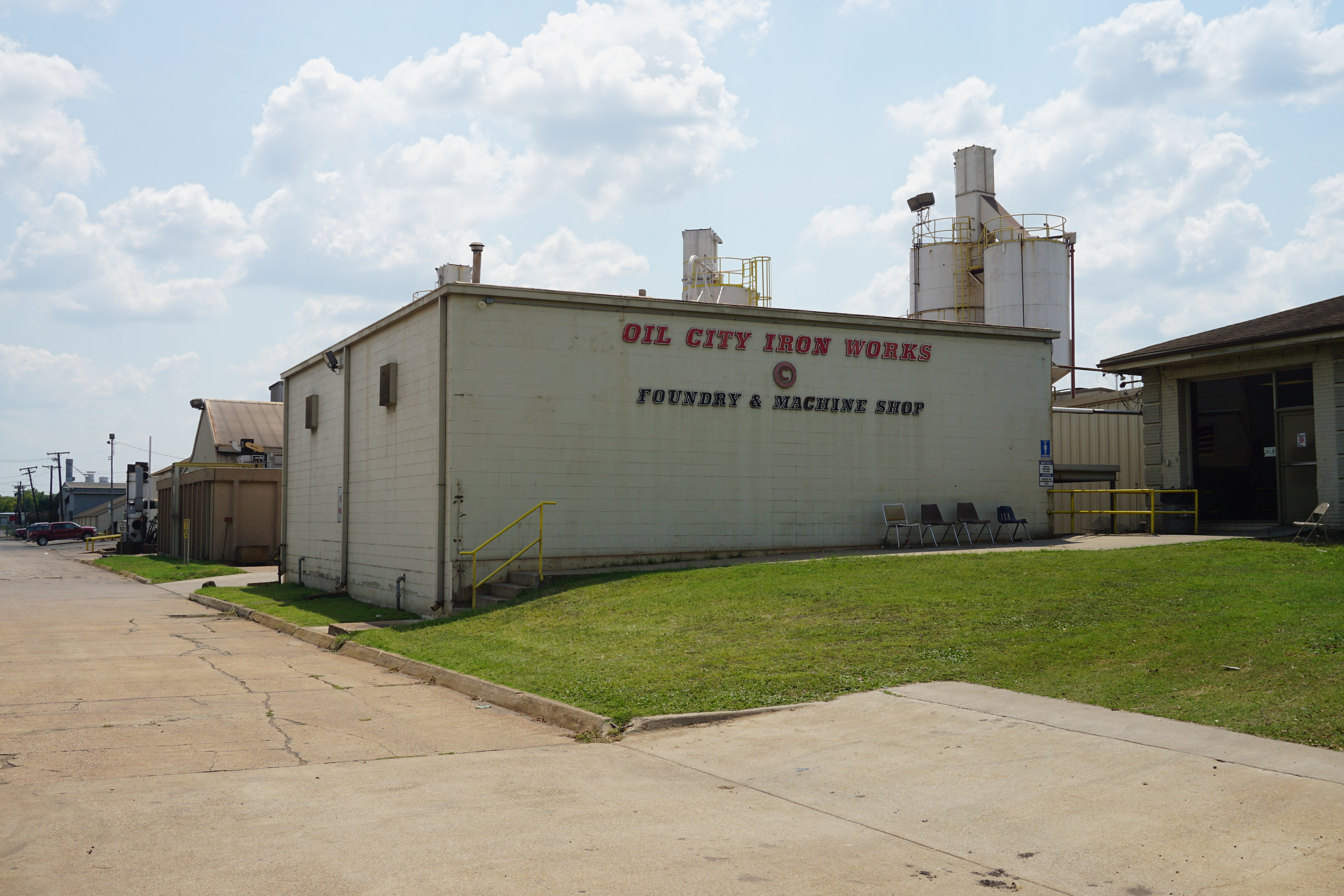
- Company type: Private
- Industry: Foundry
- Founded: Corsicana, Texas (1886)
- Founder: John Winship
- Headquarters: Corsicana, Texas, United States
- Products: Valves, pumps, gas turbines, general oilfield equipment
- Services: Foundry, Machine Shop & Pattern Making
- Revenue: $33.6 million (2007)
- Number of employees: 255
- Website: https://ociw.com/

Oil City Iron Works, Inc. is an iron foundry in Texas.

== History ==
The modern Oil City Iron Works plant grew from a small machine shop and foundry started in Corsicana, Texas in 1866 by John Winship (1826–86) to make parts for his cotton gin. He sold the operation in 1886 to businessmen Joseph Huey (1827–1904), James Garitty (1842–1925), and J. E. Whiteselle (1851–1915), who named it the Corsicana Manufacturing Company. In 1898, the cotton gin manufacturing division (formerly Winship Manufacturing Company and later Corsicana Manufacturing Company) was sold to Continental Gin Company, and the factory was leased to William Clarkson (1858–1941), a South Carolina native who came to Texas after the Civil War. After the sale of the manufacturing division the company functioned as a repair specialist for cotton gins and oil mills in East Central Texas. Clarkson renamed the company the Oil City Iron Works, because the area was then in the midst of an oil boom. He bought the company in 1908 and became president after it was incorporated in 1921.

In addition to parts for cotton gins, the plant began making castings for the oil and building industries. It was converted to defense production during World War II (1941–45). After the war the cotton industry in Navarro County declined and Oil City Iron Works diversified its operation to provide castings for the oil field, road building, farm machinery, and other industries.

In 1926 the foundry division was completely destroyed by fire. The company rebuilt and business recovered to normal levels by 1927.

In 1960 it pioneered in the usage of ductile iron in herring-bone gears for power transmission equipment principally used in deep well pumping units, and today supplies major companies around the United States.

With a workforce of 255, the plant now ranks among the fifteen largest employers in Navarro County.
