= Little Women: Dallas =

Television spin-off series of Little Women: LA

- Genre: Reality TV
- Starring: Amanda Loye; Caylea Woodbury; Tiffani Chance; Bri Barlup; Asta Young; Emily Fernandez; Brichelle Humphrey
- Country of origin: United States
- Original language: English
- No. of seasons: 2
- No. of episodes: 25

Production
- Camera setup: Multiple
- Running time: 42 minutes
- Production company: Kinetic Content

Original release
- Network: Lifetime
- Release: November 2, 2016 – May 17, 2017

Related
- Little Women: LA; Little Women: NY; Little Women: Atlanta

Little Women: Dallas is an American reality television series that debuted on November 2, 2016, on Lifetime. It is the fourth spin-off series of the Little Women: LA franchise. The series chronicles the lives of a group of women with dwarfism living in Dallas, Texas.

== Cast ==
- Caylea Woodbury
- Tiffani Chance
- Bri Barlup
- Asta Young
- Emily Fernandez
- Amanda Loy
- Brichelle Humphrey (recurring, season 1)

== Episodes ==
=== Series overview ===
Season	Episodes	Originally released	
Season	Episodes	First released	Last released
1	14	November 2, 2016	May 17, 2017
2	11	October 4, 2017	December 6, 2017

=== Season 1 (2016–2017) ===
No. overall	No. in season	Title	Original release date	US viewers (millions)
1	1	"Everything's Bigger in Texas"	November 2, 2016	0.959
In the series premiere, the ladies celebrate Caylea's 21st birthday; Bri and Emily decide whether they should part ways or stay together; Tiffani's boyfriend makes a surprise visit, which upsets some people.
2	2	"Dallas, Not Austin"	November 9, 2016	0.884
Tiffani throws a Texas-style BBQ party to introduce her boyfriend to the group; Bri invites the ladies out to the lake, but drama arises after Tiffani tells Caylea some life-disrupting news.
3	3	"Trading Spaces"	November 16, 2016	0.785
Caylea moves out of Tiffani's house, as Austin moves in; Wooda leaves Bri; Later, Emily finally feels ready to say goodbye to her son that she lost after months of mourning.
4	4	"Right to Refuse"	November 23, 2016	0.737
Amanda is getting ready for her bodybuilding competition, but she is thrown off when she is asked to take a drug test; Tiffani confronts Caylea over a pricey expense; Later, Caylea's football party ends in disaster.
5	5	"Friday Night Fights"	November 30, 2016	0.772
A huge fight breaks out at Caylea's football party; Amanda goes on a date with one of the tallest men in Texas.
6	6	"Party Crasher"	December 7, 2016	0.880
Brichelle attempts to apologize to the group, but the ladies aren't ready to forgive her; Asta's cosplay party gets cut short when Caylea gets a surprise visitor.
7	7	"Man Up"	December 14, 2016	0.820
Tiffani and Austin run into trouble; Asta gets genetic testing so that she can find out what kind of dwarfism she has; Amanda reconnects with an old flame.
8	8	"Hello! Goodbye!"	December 21, 2016	1.1
Emily and Asta argue about their new business venture; After hitting a rough patch, Tiffani breaks up with Austin; Amanda and her ex get serious with each other after reuniting.
9	9	"Birthday Blow-out"	April 12, 2017	0.835
Bri pressures Wooda to define their relationship; Emily decides to open a mini-bar in Dallas without Asta and Ty; tensions rise at Asta's birthday party.
10	10	"A New Chapter"	April 19, 2017	0.914
Asta considers an offer that could launch her art career; Caylea is confronted about her backstabbing behavior; Emily decides that she is ready to have another baby; Tiffani has a health scare.
11	11	"Not So Silent Partner"	April 26, 2017	0.822
Emily asks Terra to be her partner in business; Bri has no choice but to make a tough decision about Meek's health; Caylea gets surprising pregnancy test results.
12	12	"Dallas Strong"	May 3, 2017	0.765
Amanda enters her first bodybuilding competition in Dallas; Asta tries to flake on her business deal with Emily; Caylea deals with some big changes; Tiffani gets the surprise of a lifetime.
13	13	"Mini-Disaster"	May 10, 2017	0.811
Asta is under pressure with competing deadlines for her art show and mini bar logo; Emily and Terra butt heads over their vision of the bar; all the girls are shocked to learn about what is going on with Tiffani and Austin.
14	14	"Season 1 Reunion"	May 17, 2017	0.730
Cast members join Terra Jolé to reminisce about the season; the ladies answer tough questions about their relationships; surprise guests join the ladies on stage; a preview of next season.
