= Little Women: Atlanta =

Reality television series about women with dwarfism

- Genre: Reality TV
- Starring: Bri Barlup; Tiffany 'Monie' Cashette; Emily Fernandez; Ashley 'Minnie' Ross; Andrea Salinas; Amanda Salinas; Shirlene 'Ms. Juicy' Pearson; Tanya Scott; Samantha Ortiz; Abira Greene
- Opening theme: Just Like Dynamite by Photronique
- Country of origin: United States
- Original language: English
- No. of seasons: 6
- No. of episodes: 95

Production
- Executive producers: Chris Coelen; Eric Detwiler; Scott Teti; Vanessa Butler; Rob Schwarze; Katie Griffin; Karrie Wolfe; Terra Jolé; Shirlene "Ms. Juicy" King; Gena McCarthy; Brie Miranda Bryant; Cat Rodriguez
- Camera setup: Multiple
- Running time: 42 minutes
- Production company: Kinetic Content

Original release
- Network: Lifetime
- Release: January 27, 2016 – September 23, 2021

Related
- Little Women: LA; Little Women: NY; Little Women: Dallas; Little Women: Terra's Little Family

Little Women: Atlanta is an American reality television series that debuted on January 27, 2016, on Lifetime. It is the third spin-off series to Little Women: LA. The series chronicles the lives of a group of little women living in Atlanta, Georgia. For the third season, Briana Barlup & Emily Fernandez moved to the show Little Women: Dallas concurrent with their move to Texas.

== Cast ==
=== Overview ===
==== Season 1-3 ====
The first season follows the lives of Ashley "Minnie" Ross (also called "Mama Bear"), Tiffany "Monie" Cashette, Briana Barlup (Bri) & Emily Fernandez, also known as "the Cheeks", and Amanda & Andrea Salinas, also called "Tiny Twinz" as the main cast, with Shirlene "Ms. Juicy" Pearson in a recurring capacity.

The second season premiered on July 13, 2016, with the same cast, with Shirlene Pearson promoted to a main cast member while Samantha Ortiz and Tanya Scott make guest appearances, and with Melissa Hancock and the Drummond twins in the recurring guest capacity. Briana Barlup and Emily Fernandez announced at the reunion that they would no longer be part of the show and were moving to Little Women: Dallas.

The third season premiered on January 4, 2017, with Tanya Scott promoted to a main cast member, Samantha Ortiz in a recurring capacity and Abira Greene appeared in a guest recurring capacity.

==== Season 4-6 ====
The fourth season premiered on December 14, 2017, with the same cast, with Samantha Ortiz promoted to a main cast member. However, after season four ended, Samantha and Tanya announced that they would no longer be a part of the show. According to Tanya, she felt as if the show did not bring positive energy into her life. She felt as if two seasons were enough. It is unclear whether Samantha had been asked to return to the show despite rumors hinting of the failed retention as her termination.

The fifth season saw the departure of both Scott and Ortiz, and the return of Barlup and Fernandez after departing the series after the second season. Tiffany "Monie" Cashette returned as a recurring member for the fifth season, citing a move to Houston as the reason for her departure. Both Barlup and Fernandez departed the series a second time at the end of the fifth season.

The sixth season premiered on January 22, 2021, with Cashette returning to the series as a main cast member, as well as Abira Greene, who had been featured for the past three seasons, promoted to a main cast member. This season also features the death of original cast member, Ashley "Minnie" Ross, who died on April 27, 2020, after sustaining injuries in a head-on-collision. Barlup and Scott return in recurring roles, and Tamera MacLaughlin joins the cast in a recurring capacity.

| Main cast | Seasons | | | | | |
| Main cast | 1 | 2 | 3 | 4 | 5 | 6 |
|---|---|---|---|---|---|---|
| Ashley "Minnie" Ross | Main | | | | | |
| Amanda Salinas | Main | | | | | |
| Andrea Salinas | Main | | | | | |
| Tiffany "Monie" Cashette | Main | | | | Recurring | Main |
| Briana Barlup | Main | | | | Main | Recurring |
| Emily Fernandez | Main | | | | Main | |
| Shirlene "Ms. Juicy" King | Recurring | Main | | | | |
| Tanya Scott | | Guest | Main | | | Recurring |
| Samantha Ortiz | | Guest | Recurring | Main | | |
| Abira Greene | | | Recurring | | | Main |
| Melissa Hancock | | Guest | | | | |
| Hope and Charity Drummond | | Guest | | | | |
| Tamera McLaughlin | | | | | | Recurring |

== Episodes ==
=== Series overview ===
| Season | Episodes | Originally released | |
| Season | Episodes | First released | Last released |
|---|---|---|---|
| 1 | 9 | January 27, 2016 | March 23, 2016 |
| 2 | 16 | July 13, 2016 | October 26, 2016 |
| 3 | 27 | January 4, 2017 | June 28, 2017 |
| 4 | 14 | December 14, 2017 | March 14, 2018 |
| 5 | 16 | March 28, 2019 | July 18, 2019 |
| 6 | 17 | January 22, 2021 | September 23, 2021 |

=== Season 1 (2016) ===
| No. overall | No. in season | Title | Original release date | U.S. viewers (millions) |
|---|---|---|---|---|
| 1 | 1 | "Twerk Off!" | January 27, 2016 | 1.30 |
The newest group of Little Women chase big dreams down south in Atlanta! The ladies hit the town for a night at the club, but things get heated when the tiny twins, Andrea and Amanda, face off against Bri and Emily. Minnie's love life becomes a point of contention in the group and one of the girls is brought to tears when she reveals her pregnancy to the father.
| 2 | 2 | "Juicy Gossip" | February 3, 2016 | 1.10 |
As tensions continue to escalate between the Twins and Cheeks, Emily decides it's time to reveal her pregnancy to the group. Meanwhile Minnie confronts Miss Juicy about her lies!
| 3 | 3 | "Tiny Twins Takeover" | February 10, 2016 | 1.22 |
Emily invites all the girls horseback riding, causing Amanda and Andrea to doubt whether she's really pregnant. Bri wants more from her relationship with her baby daddy Wooda, but when he won't commit, she goes looking for someone who will.
| 4 | 4 | "Birthday Blowout" | February 17, 2016 | 1.40 |
Andrea and Chris' relationship problems come to a head. Struggling with their own interpersonal issues, Bri invites Emily and Minnie into the wilderness for a "Relationship ReBootcamp." Meanwhile, Minnie plans a birthday party and all hell breaks loose when an unexpected guest crashes her big night.
| 5 | 5 | "Bad Apples" | February 24, 2016 | 1.45 |
The girls struggle to make sense of Monie's recent behavior and a peaceful day of apple picking unearths a secret from Minnie that rocks the group. Tensions reach an all-time high as "The Cheeks," Emily and Bri, and the twins, Amanda and Andrea, find themselves caught up in an all out turf-war.
| 6 | 6 | "Mo Monie, Mo Problems" | March 2, 2016 | 1.51 |
Emily's pregnancy helps mend her relationship with her boyfriend Lontel. Bri's attempt to get closer to her baby's father ends in a difficult choice. The girls come together to dance in Monie's friend's music video, but when the director insults little people, the girls threaten to walk.
| 7 | 7 | "Savannah Showdown" | March 9, 2016 | 1.16 |
The Cheeks and Twins find themselves working together when Emily books the girls a gig and a vacation in Savannah, but Bri isn't convinced the Twins can play nice. Meanwhile tensions run high between Minnie and Monie over the disastrous music video shoot, causing a divide within the group.
| 8 | 8 | "Little Women Big Changes" | March 16, 2016 | 1.29 |
When the man Minnie believes is her father agrees to a paternity test, she decides to throw a party to reveal the emotional results. Emily learns the sex and size of her baby while Amanda makes a choice that will impact her relationship with her twin sister Andrea forever.
| 9 | 9 | "Reunion" | March 23, 2016 | 1.16 |
Host Terra Jolé sits down with the ladies of Little Women: Atlanta to revisit all the excitement and drama from this season. The girls answer tough questions about their relationships and things get serious when some surprise guests join them on stage.

=== Season 2 (2016) ===
| No. overall | No. in season | Title | Original release date | U.S. viewers (millions) |
|---|---|---|---|---|
| 10 | 1 | "Little Babies, Big Lies" | July 13, 2016 | 1.02 |
Juicy and the girls plan a surprise baby shower for Minnie that doesn't go as planned. Meanwhile, Emily and Lontel travel to Dallas for the birth of their child, where Emily doubts if Lontel is ready to be a father.
| 11 | 2 | "Tammie Turns Up" | July 20, 2016 | 1.19 |
Juicy and Monie form a united front against Minnie after her miscarriage story fails to convince them she was ever pregnant to begin with. Meanwhile, Bri provides a shoulder to cry on for Emily, who's struggling with her newborn son's health issues. And when Tammie finds out what went down at the baby shower, she sets out for revenge.
| 12 | 3 | "Beach Bound" | July 27, 2016 | 1.25 |
The Tiny Twins' visit to Dallas takes a turn when Chris disappears, leaving Andrea feeling abandoned again. As the ladies hit the road to Myrtle Beach, Minnie prepares to confront Ms. Juicy over a recent discovery.
| 13 | 4 | "Booty and the Beach" | August 3, 2016 | 1.31 |
Sparks continue to fly in Myrtle Beach after the girls bring their drama along for the ride. Ms. Juicy hosts an event at an all-male strip club and Amanda boils over when new girl Melissa refuses to mind her business. Meanwhile, Andrea is rushed to the hospital with dangerous contractions.
| 14 | 5 | "Law and Disorder" | August 10, 2016 | 1.33 |
Romance and tension are in the air as the girls take a trip to a local winery. Juicy, Minnie and Tammie square off in court, and Bri faces a major decision with Wooda. Meanwhile, Andrea learns whether her baby girl will be average or a little person.
| 15 | 6 | "Counterfeit Monie" | August 17, 2016 | 1.18 |
At the Chattahoochee River, Minnie challenges Monie on her status as a little person, because Monie stands taller than the rest, at 4' 5", and has not been tested or diagnosed. Tensions rise between Andrea and Amanda over Andrea's relationship with Chris.
| 16 | 7 | "Sister Act" | August 24, 2016 | 1.31 |
Minnie works up the courage to reach out to her recently discovered half-sister in hopes of reconnecting with her estranged father. Meanwhile, Emily is forced to make a difficult decision regarding the health of her newborn son, JJ. And after Monie's status as a little person was called into question, she sets out to prove she has dwarfism, once and for all by doing genetic testing.
| 17 | 8 | "Rock the Boat" | August 31, 2016 | 1.38 |
When Minnie decides to put herself back out there, her boss sets her up on an unexpected blind date. Juicy's friends Hope and Charity, another set of little twins, make a big splash when they invite all the girls to a boat party on Lake Lanier.
| 18 | 9 | "Unhappy Birthday" | September 7, 2016 | 1.45 |
Bri invites the girls to celebrate Meek's 3rd birthday, but when Juicy shows up with the new twins, Hope and Charity, tensions mount and Monie loses her cool. And when sudden contractions force Andrea to have an emergency C-section, Chris is nowhere to be found.
| 19 | 10 | "All the Juicy Details" | September 14, 2016 | 1.42 |
Juicy decides to take a huge step in her radio career by launching her own sex advice talk show. Meanwhile Andrea is left to fend for herself after her boyfriend Chris does the unthinkable. And Hope and Charity try to make amends with the group by throwing a dinner party, but the night takes a turn when they surprise the girls with psychic readings and Minnie's past comes back to haunt her.
| 20 | 11 | "Welcome Home Aubrey" | September 21, 2016 | 1.25 |
Minnie moves in with Andrea to help when baby Aubrey comes home. But when the rest of the girls come over to meet the baby, it isn’t long before Ms. Juicy is stirring up trouble. Meanwhile things get heated when Bri and Wooda disagree about whether to get Meek involved in child modeling. And Chris’ sudden return to Atlanta comes as a shock to everyone but Andrea.
| 21 | 12 | "Three's a Crowd" | September 28, 2016 | 1.28 |
Chris’ surprise return to Atlanta forces Andrea to make an agonizing decision regarding Minnie. Meanwhile Juicy attempts to rebuild her friendship with Minnie, but a trip to the Atlanta bridal expo opens old wounds and ends in an explosive argument.
| 22 | 13 | "Say Yes to the Mess" | October 5, 2016 | 1.34 |
Tensions build when Andrea confronts Chris about his lack of help taking care of their daughter Aubrey. As the girls celebrate Monie's bachelorette, Monie makes an unexpected wedding announcement that puts her and Ms. Juicy's friendship on the line.
| 23 | 14 | "Little Women, Big Hair" | October 12, 2016 | 1.48 |
Amanda comes to Andrea's rescue when Chris reverts to his old ways. As Bri grapples with a decision that threatens to divide her family, Monie prepares to share some big news with the group: the fact that she has a rare form of dwarfism related to a mutant NPR2 gene. And the girls wig out as they take the runway at Atlanta's premiere hair show!
| 24 | 15 | "Reunion, Part 1" | October 19, 2016 | 1.28 |
The ladies come together with host Kevin Frazier to recap Season 2. Chris and Jordan stop by to discuss their relationships with the twins, Andrea and Amanda. Meanwhile, Miss Juicy puts Minnie in the hot seat when it comes to her pregnancy. Minnie's mom, Tammie, also makes an appearance to let Miss Juicy know exactly how she feels about her.
| 25 | 16 | "Reunion, Part 2" | October 26, 2016 | 1.34 |
The reunion continues when Monie makes it known that she only wants one Maid of Honor for her wedding. But a surprise guest and some new information comes to light, putting Monie's wedding plans in jeopardy. Charity and Hope make an appearance to try to set the record straight on all the drama they caused. And finally, we get a sneak peek at the new series, Little Women: Dallas.

=== Season 3 (2017) ===
| No. overall | No. in season | Title | Original release date | U.S. viewers (millions) |
|---|---|---|---|---|
| 26 | 1 | "Party Foul" | January 4, 2017 | 1.30 |
Tanya invites the ladies over for a party, where things get heated between some of the ladies. Minnie makes a shocking confession to Juicy.
| 27 | 2 | "The Truth Hurts" | January 11, 2017 | 1.13 |
Monie's biological brother and father pay her a visit unannounced. The twins feel backstabbed because of Minnie's confession. Sam confronts Minnie about a newly discovered mugshot, and about the lies that she's told in the past.
| 28 | 3 | "Masquerade Ballers" | January 18, 2017 | 0.997 |
With Chris being away, Andrea deals with her daughter's health issues by herself; Sam and Monie offer to help Tanya make custody arrangements with her ex; The ladies attend a masquerade ball for charity, where they get attention for the wrong reasons.
| 29 | 4 | "Just a Friend" | January 25, 2017 | 0.904 |
Minnie's mother asks if she can live with her; Tanya's ex visits Atlanta, which leads the group to question whether their relationship is strictly nonphysical.
| 30 | 5 | "Mama Drama" | February 1, 2017 | 1.13 |
Tanya discloses the truth about her relationship with Nico; Ms.Juicy invites the ladies to the taping of her TV pilot; Andrea shares some news with Amanda that could divide their family.
| 31 | 6 | "Dinner Reservations" | February 8, 2017 | 1.06 |
Monie confesses to Morlin that she lost her engagement ring, which causes him to make a decision; Andrea goes to counseling after a quarrel with her mother and sister; Juicy invites the ladies out to dinner to meet her mother.
| 32 | 7 | "Pregnant Pause" | February 15, 2017 | 0.991 |
The twins attend speech therapy and meet their new managers; After her breakup with Morlin, Monie is devastated; Minnie tries to cheer Monie up by inviting her and the ladies to a camping trip, where Tanya reveals some big news.
| 33 | 8 | "Insignificant Other" | February 22, 2017 | 1.06 |
Minnie asks the ladies for advice on her relationship with Gary; Amanda and Andrea get ready for a visit from their parents; Later, Tanya announces that Nico is moving in with her, and Sam makes her true feelings on the situation known.
| 34 | 9 | "Houston, We Have a Problem" | March 1, 2017 | 0.918 |
Monie goes to Houston to pay her son D2 a visit. When she asks her ex-husband if D2 can live in Atlanta with her, she doesn't get the response that she was expecting; Tanya is concerned about her future with Nico; Minnie deals with a scary medical issue.
| 35 | 10 | "Bad Romance" | March 8, 2017 | 0.805 |
Tanya has a housewarming party to reintroduce Nico to the ladies, but things don't go as planned; Minnie and Juicy come up with a plan to reunite Monie and Morlin; Later, Amanda celebrates her second anniversary with Jordan, and gets a surprise.
| 36 | 11 | "Bobbleheads Will Roll" | March 15, 2017 | 0.939 |
Amanda talks to Jordan about the future of their relationship; Monie throws Morlin a casino party; Minnie throws shade after Ms.Juicy exhibits a new venture of hers.
| 37 | 12 | "Spill The Tea" | March 22, 2017 | 0.910 |
Ms.Juicy is having a birthday party, and Minnie isn't invited to it after she denies responsibility for her actions. Regardless, Minnie crashes the event, which causes Juicy to take drastic measures.
| 38 | 13 | "In It to Twin It" | March 29, 2017 | 0.946 |
Sam returns to Atlanta, but not all of the ladies in the group are happy to see her. Later, Andrea and Amanda host their first event at a popular nightclub, but Abira (Tanya's friend), steals the spotlight which results in a throw-down in the parking lot.
| 39 | 14 | "Not So Little Surprises" | April 5, 2017 | 0.867 |
The twins must choose if they want to squash their beef with Abira. Nico reaches out to Ms.Juicy to chat with her. Later, Tanya's mom confronts Nico at Tanya's gender reveal party.
| 40 | 15 | "Escape From Atlanta" | April 12, 2017 | 0.922 |
Minnie invites the ladies to an escape room, and hopes to repair her friendship with Juicy while there. Later, Tanya meets with Nico, after his confession spreads throughout the group.
| 41 | 16 | "Stage Fight" | April 19, 2017 | 1.00 |
When Juicy doesn't include Minnie in an acting workshop, it causes a breech between the twins. Tanya has a hard time accepting her kids' genetic results. Monie, Juicy, and Sam do a play, but Sam's stage fright might affect the performance.
| 42 | 17 | "Good Deed Gone Bad" | April 26, 2017 | 0.866 |
The ladies do some volunteering with the Rickey Smiley Foundation, but their good deed goes bad when Minnie asks Juicy's boss for some help getting into radio. Tanya's birth plan hits a barrier when her doctor is concerned about Tanya's wish to have a natural birth.
| 43 | 18 | "Miami Vices" | May 3, 2017 | 0.838 |
When the twins book a gig in South Beach, they invite all the ladies along for some fun in the sun; Juicy and Minnie's rivalry threatens to ruin everyone's trip; Andrea struggles with being away from her children.
| 44 | 19 | "Cruise Control" | May 10, 2017 | 0.824 |
The ladies set out on a cruise to the Bahamas; Amanda continues to doubt Andrea's commitment to the Tiny Twinz; Tanya and Andrea form an unlikely bond over their similar family situations; Monie worries there may not be a future for her and Morlin.
| 45 | 20 | "Unexpected Ending" | May 17, 2017 | 0.826 |
Monie must take matters into her own hands when Morlin refuses to commit to a wedding; Andrea makes a shocking decision that blindsides Amanda; Tanya attempts to bring Nico and DeVon together with disastrous results.
| 46 | 21 | "Season 3 Reunion: Part 1" | May 24, 2017 | 0.918 |
The ladies come together with host Terra Jolé to recap season three; Minnie's mother stirs up conflict with the entire cast; Tanya's complicated relationships take center stage; Abira returns.
| 47 | 22 | "Season 3 Reunion: Part 2" | May 31, 2017 | 1.34 |
The “Little Women: Atlanta” reunion continues as Minnie and Abira’s conflict boils over, with Tammie adding more fuel to the fire backstage. Once host Terra Jolé gets things back under control, the ladies look back at happier times including their trip to the Bahamas. And finally, we get a sneak peek at Monie’s upcoming wedding specials.
| 48 | 23 | "Monie Gets Married: New Beginnings" | June 7, 2017 | N/A |
Monie and Morlin are finally on the path to marriage! But, Monie’s plans to say “I do” on the beach in Jamaica are quickly derailed when a family conflict means her stepfather might not be there to walk her down the aisle. With this shocking news, Monie scrambles to get her dream wedding back on track.
| 49 | 24 | "Monie Gets Married: Runaway Groom" | June 14, 2017 | N/A |
Monie, Morlin and the whole wedding party hit Vegas for a dual Bachelor and Bachelorette weekend. Maid of Honor Juicy plans Monie a night to remember, but when Morlin doesn’t come home after his night out with the boys, Monie’s left questioning whether his heart is still in it.
| 50 | 25 | "Monie Gets Married: Best Man Betrayal" | June 21, 2017 | N/A |
With only one week till the wedding, Monie and Morlin arrive in Houston only to discover that the venue isn’t going to work. Meanwhile, Amanda lets Minnie in on a secret that could change the Tiny Twinz forever. Tensions between Morlin and his best man begin to mount resulting in an explosive showdown.
| 51 | 26 | "Monie Gets Married: Wedding Bells and Farewells" | June 28, 2017 | N/A |
The big day has arrived and Monie is ready to say “I Do”, but when the wedding cake is nowhere to be found, the bridezilla comes out! Amanda asks Andrea to move back to Atlanta after the wedding, but Andrea has other plans. Sam warns Minnie not to steal the spotlight on Monie’s special day, but Minnie has her own agenda.
| 52 | 27 | "A Little Thankful" | November 22, 2017 | N/A |
The ladies get together for a special holiday dinner to talk turkey and spill the tea. They reminisce about moments from the past three seasons and when things get heated, the knives literally come out! But, save room for dessert: after dinner, there’s a special sneak peek of season four of Little Women: Atlanta.

=== Season 4 (2017–18) ===
| No. overall | No. in season | Title | Original release date | U.S. viewers (millions) |
|---|---|---|---|---|
| 53 | 1 | "Rumor Has It" | December 14, 2017 | 1.29 |
On the season premiere, Monie finally has her happily ever after, but when Juicy reveals some damaging information about Morlin, it threatens to end Monie's marriage. Back in Atlanta following their couples retreat, Andrea struggles to find balance between her relationship with Chris and her friendship with her sister.
| 54 | 2 | "Caught in the Middle" | December 20, 2017 | 0.744 |
Monie finds herself caught in the middle after Juicy and Morlin's blowup at Tanya's baby shower; Minnie helps Sam confront her worsening hair loss; a trip to the doctor forces Andrea to reveal a big secret to Amanda.
| 55 | 3 | "Big Little News" | December 27, 2017 | 0.894 |
Juicy is presented with a new business venture; Monie makes a final plea to her ex in hopes of getting her son to move to Atlanta; with her parents in town for Aubrey's first birthday, Andrea fears they will disapprove of her pregnancy.
| 56 | 4 | "You're Fired" | January 3, 2018 | 0.888 |
Minnie trains for her first 5K run; Amanda has a showdown with the Tiny Twinz's manager, Gayle; new manager Juicy signs her first artist; dangerous complications arise as Tanya prepares to give birth at home.
| 57 | 5 | "Skinny Minnie" | January 10, 2018 | 0.687 |
Sam steps in when Minnie decides to try a dangerous weight-loss procedure; Amanda lands an apprenticeship at a nail salon, but her first job without her sister is not what she expected; Tanya is reluctant to bring her baby around some of the girls.
| 58 | 6 | "Radio Wars" | January 17, 2018 | 0.785 |
During Monie's surprise birthday party for Morlin, Minnie announces she has landed a new gig in radio; with another baby on the way, Andrea gives Chris an ultimatum; Tanya is forced to make a difficult decision regarding her other children.
| 59 | 7 | "Juicy's Got Talent" | January 24, 2018 | 0.798 |
Following a heated argument, Nico finally expresses his true feelings for Tanya; Minnie's health takes a dangerous turn; Sam and the twins learn Caylea from Dallas is performing in Juicy's talent showcase, turning her big night into a big disaster.
| 60 | 8 | "Road Trippin' Part 1" | January 24, 2018 | 0.728 |
Amanda and Jordan convince the group to go on a fishing trip, but Jordan has ulterior motives; Tanya makes a decision regarding Tahirih that impacts the entire group; all hell breaks loose after Minnie finds out Abira has been invited on the trip.
| 61 | 9 | "Road Trippin' Part 2" | January 31, 2018 | 0.837 |
The drama heats up during the group's fishing trip in Tennessee; Minnie worries she has ruined Jordan's surprise for Amanda; Andrea and Chris fall back into their old ways when Chris' jealousy gets the best of him.
| 62 | 10 | "Another Bad Romance" | February 7, 2018 | 0.736 |
Tanya contemplates her future with Devon; Minnie becomes forced to deal with her worsening health issues; Andrea's jealousy over not being included in Jordan's surprise has catastrophic consequences for her and Minnie's friendship.
| 63 | 11 | "Cover Girls" | February 21, 2018 | 0.803 |
Juicy lands her first magazine cover shoot but takes a risk by hiring Sam to do her makeup; Minnie debates whether to forgive Andrea and attend her baby shower; Monie realizes things might be moving too fast with Morlin.
| 64 | 12 | "Girl Power" | February 28, 2018 | 0.632 |
Monie and Minnie help Sam overcome her commitment issues; Andrea experiences serious pregnancy complications, putting her and the baby at risk; the girls rally around Juicy after she receives an unexpected health scare. Juicy and Abira clash.
| 65 | 13 | "Big Little Decisions" | March 7, 2018 | 0.762 |
Sam helps Devon plan a romantic surprise for Tanya; Juicy sets out to buy her dream home, but Monie thinks she is making a big mistake; Andrea struggles with a decision that could change her life forever.
| 66 | 14 | "Ex & The City" | March 14, 2018 | 0.957 |
Tanya plans a trip to New York City with some of the girls, but an unannounced guest throws her plans into turmoil; Sam worries about introducing her new boyfriend to the girls and her parents; Andrea is rushed to the hospital.

=== Season 5 (2019) ===
| No. overall | No. in season | Title | Original release date | U.S. viewers (millions) |
|---|---|---|---|---|
| 67 | 1 | "Guess Who's Back" | March 28, 2019 | 0.682 |
After firing their manager, the Twinz are under a deadline to get their career back on track. Juicy meets with Atlanta rap moguls The Street Execs and gets offered a huge opportunity. Monie is devastated by news that could change her and her family's lives, and the return of familiar faces ushers in a new level of drama.
| 68 | 2 | "Diss Means War" | April 4, 2019 | 0.629 |
Juicy drops the bomb that makes the Cheeks and the Twinz reconsider their shot with Street Execs. The Cheeks uproot their families to Atlanta for a career break, despite the secret Emily is carrying. Meanwhile, Minnie devises a plan to use her podcast to trick Juicy into helping Abira and the Twinz are upset by a song dissing them at an event thrown by the Street Execs.
| 69 | 3 | "Put a Ring On It" | April 11, 2019 | 0.746 |
Chris shocks Amanda with his plan to propose to Andrea. Emily throws a pregnancy wrench in Juicy's plans for the Cheeks and the Street Execs. Meanwhile, Minnie lands a legendary hip hop artist to co-host her podcast and things get tense when the Twinz and Abira collaborate on a track.
| 70 | 4 | "Show Up And Show Out" | April 18, 2019 | 0.543 |
The Cheat Code concert is coming up which will decide who's going to be the opening act on the Street Execs tour. Juicy and the Cheeks worry that Emily's pregnancy will knock the Cheeks out of the running so Juicy's forced to look for back-up. Meanwhile, Minnie sees it as an opportunity to get The Twinz and Abira in the door but that doesn't sit well with Juicy. A lifetime of ear issues threatens Andrea's ability to record the Twinz track and exacerbate her ongoing problems with new fiancé, Chris.
| 71 | 5 | "On The Dotted Line" | April 25, 2019 | 0.662 |
With proceeds for album sales and concert tour on the line, Minnie and Juicy hustle to officially sign their artists but Juicy has a trick up her sleeve. The Twinz bump heads when they realize how difficult it is to plan a double wedding and maintain their music career. Meanwhile, Minnie's health reaches critical condition and she is forced to make a life changing decision.
| 72 | 6 | "Why You Mad, Sis?" | May 2, 2019 | 0.532 |
Juicy and Minnie are given another challenge to prove their clients have what it takes to land a spot on the Street Execs Tour. Emily's ego threatens to sabotage the Cheek's reputation. Monie Love sets Minnie up with a new love interest and Minnie throws down with Juicy over trying to poach her clients.
| 73 | 7 | "Collaborate, Not Hate" | May 9, 2019 | 0.712 |
After a disastrous meeting at the Street Execs, Juicy and Minnie have their work cut out for themselves to repair their relationship with the record label and keep Abira and Emily from tanking the compilation LP, an opportunity of a lifetime. Meanwhile, the friction among the artists leads to an unlikely electric collaboration between Bumpman and Abira. The Twinz push forward planning their double wedding despite Chris being M.I.A. and Minnie reveals intimate details about her health and her love life in her podcast with Monie Love.
| 74 | 8 | "Getting Schooled" | May 16, 2019 | 0.653 |
With the LP album dead, Minnie needs to develop The Twinz as artists to keep them in the running for the Street Execs tour. She convinces the Twinz to collaborate with an up and coming artist who's never worked with Little People before, which soon proves the prejudice that they're up against. Fed up with Emily's bad attitude, Juicy gives The Cheeks a time out which puts Emily on the offensive. Abira and Andrea attempt to learn how to manage their anger but it might be too little too late.
| 75 | 9 | "Collabing With The Enemy" | May 23, 2019 | 0.628 |
After Emily goes behind Bri's back, Bri makes a drastic move and approaches their long-time arch enemies, the Tiny Twinz, in the hopes of a collaboration. Minnie bravely accepts Odell's comedy challenge and Emily leaves Atlanta and Bri goes back to Texas.
| 76 | 10 | "For Better Or Worse" | May 30, 2019 | 0.716 |
As the Twinz continue to plan their double wedding, Andrea runs into issues with Chris which threatens to tear apart their joint wedding plans. Now with Emily gone from Atlanta, Bri decides to try a solo career behind Emily's back. Abira and Bumpman decide to take their relationship to the next level.
| 77 | 11 | "Maid Of Dishonor" | June 6, 2019 | 0.640 |
The ATL gang descend upon Dallas for Amanda's wedding. Juicy lands the Cheeks an interview with Salute Magazine, and Bri gets mad when Emily takes all the attention. Meanwhile, Minnie finds out she's been demoted from Maid of Honor and it threatens to ruin Amanda's bachelorette party.
| 78 | 12 | "Crazy, Stupid Love" | June 13, 2019 | 0.686 |
Everyone's in Texas for Amanda's wedding except Chris, who has tried to make amends with Andrea but she's on the fence. All the while, Juicy spills the beans to Emily, and Bri has been recording behind her back and causes a rift between them. And Amanda's father questions her marrying Jordan, just before he walks her down the aisle.
| 79 | 13 | "Stealing My Shine" | June 20, 2019 | 0.669 |
Abira goes ballistic when she thinks Minnie is doing more for the Twinz than for her; Juicy approaches Bri with great career opportunity, but worries if Bri is Emily's puppet; Andrea receives a big surprise that could ruin her night.
| 80 | 14 | "Jealously Is Not A Good Look" | June 27, 2019 | 0.586 |
Juicy continues to build her clientele by scoping out new artists and inventors; Andrea wants to leave the music biz to focus on family; Emily tries to convince Bri not to perform solo; Abira pops off at Minnie's birthday party.
| 81 | 15 | "The Final Count" | July 11, 2019 | 0.663 |
Abira's anger issues toward the Twinz and Minnie's mismanagement puts everyone's performance chances at risk; Bri stands to miss out on a once-in-a-lifetime opportunity after Emily summons her back to Dallas due to pregnancy complications.
| 82 | 16 | "Burying The Hatchet With Ms. Ratchet" | July 18, 2019 | 0.767 |
Abira's drunken outburst as the Final Cut causes friction; Emily gives birth to her son in an emergency cesarean section; the Street Execs' decision on who will be the opening act on their upcoming tour leaves everyone stunned.

=== Season 6 (2021) ===
| No. overall | No. in season | Title | Original release date | U.S. viewers (millions) |
|---|---|---|---|---|
| 83 | 0 | "Kick-off Special" | January 22, 2021 | N/A |
The ladies reunite with host Terra Jole to look back at the last five seasons; the girls answer tough questions about their relationships.
| 84 | 1 | "No Respect For The Queen" | January 29, 2021 | N/A |
Monie makes her return to Atlanta looking for support and a place to stay; the long-standing feud between Abira and the Twinz erupts.
| 85 | 2 | "Minnie's Got a Man" | February 5, 2021 | N/A |
Monie struggles to make sense with her crumbling marriage; Amanda deals with a health issue; the Twinz and Abira continue to battle it out; tensions run high when Minnie introduces her new man to the group.
| 86 | 3 | "Spiritual Smackdown" | February 12, 2021 | N/A |
As Amanda takes control of her music career, Minnie's management skills come into question; Tanya makes a surprise return to Atlanta to celebrate Abira's birthday and attempt to bring the fractured group back together through some spiritual healing.
| 87 | 4 | "Miss Management" | February 19, 2021 | N/A |
After the showdown with the Twinz, Abira gains some perspective on how being little affected her; the Twinz put Minnie on notice; Andrea attempts to walk the runway; Juicy insults the rest of the girls when a St. Patrick's Day gig goes awry.
| 88 | 5 | "A Life Worth Celebrating" | February 26, 2021 | N/A |
After losing their sister Ms. Minnie in a devastating car accident, the ladies of Atlanta come together to honor her legacy and celebrate her beautiful life; as the girls mourn their beloved friend, the reality of Minnie's loss proves too much to bear for some.
| 89 | 6 | "Little Women, Big Voices" | March 5, 2021 | N/A |
Abira shows up tipsy to a self-defense class; Monie is undermined by Morlin; Amanda gets lifechanging news; Ms. Juicy holds a rally against racial injustice.
| 90 | 7 | "All the Rage" | March 12, 2021 | N/A |
A relaxing day on the lake turns tense when Ms. Juicy surprises the girls with a new friend; Andrea encounters tough competition as she struggles to impress at her first modeling audition; Ms. Juicy's friend pushes Monie too far.
| 91 | 8 | "Don't Give Up On Me" | March 19, 2021 | N/A |
| 92 | 9 | "Model Mayhem" | August 26, 2021 | 0.36 |
| 93 | 10 | "Music City Meltdown" | August 26, 2021 | 0.27 |
| 94 | 11 | "Stop Horsing Around!" | September 2, 2021 | 0.40 |
| 95 | 12 | "Sharing is NOT Caring" | September 2, 2021 | 0.37 |
| 96 | 13 | "Rise to the Occasion" | September 9, 2021 | 0.32 |
| 97 | 14 | "Cupid Crisis" | September 9, 2021 | 0.37 |
| 98 | 15 | "Skating On Thin Ice" | September 16, 2021 | 0.35 |
| 99 | 16 | "What Would Minnie Do?" | September 16, 2021 | 0.37 |
| 100 | 17 | "The Reunion Special" | September 23, 2021 | 0.33 |
