= Powell oil field =

Oil field in Navarro County, Texas, U.S.

Coordinates: 32.01778°N 96.385°W

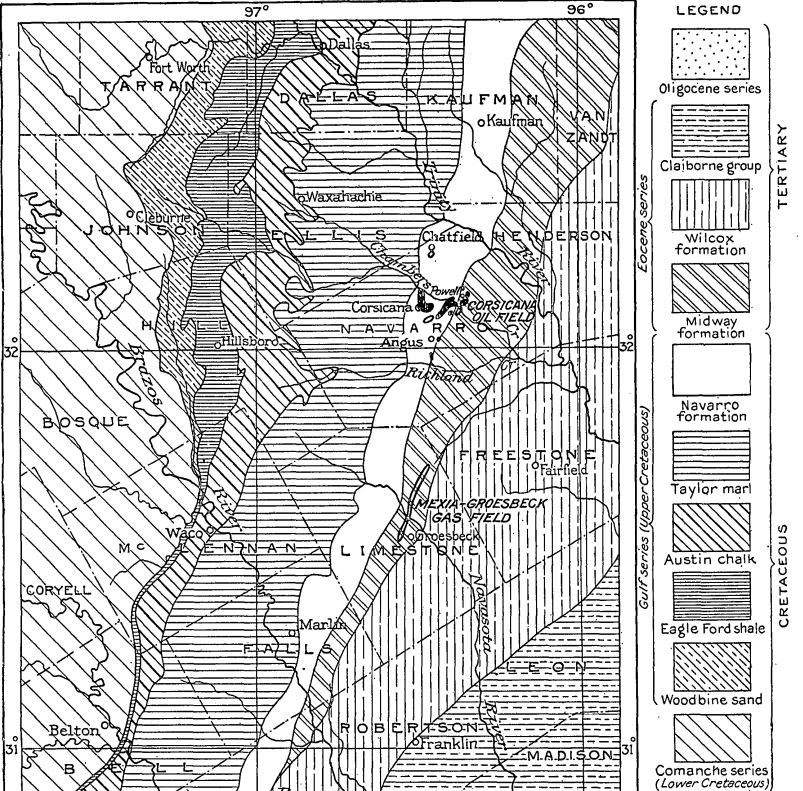
Corsicana and Powell oil fields geological map

The Powell Oil Field was an oil field developed in eastern Navarro County, Texas in 1900.

Encouraged by nearby discoveries in Mexia and Wortham, the Corsicana Deep Well Company announced plans to drill for oil in the Powell area in the June 9, 1897 issue of the Corsicana Daily Sun. However the drilling effort yielded a dry hole and was abandoned six months later.

A second attempt also failed. Finally, on January 7, 1900, now more than three years from the announcement, oil was found.

By July 14, 17 wells were in operation. Seven more came in on a single day, August 1, 1923. Soon the Powell field was pumping more oil than the combined oil production of the day in the states of Colorado, Illinois, Iowa, Kansas, Kentucky, New York, Ohio, Pennsylvania, Tennessee, and West Virginia.

By 1924, the field contained 611 producing wells. Production peaked in November 1923 at 356,000 BOPD.

The Powell oil field produced wealth and tragedy in great proportions. On May 10, 1923, a spark ignited the derrick floor. The fire caused 13 men to die from horrible burns.

By the late 1920s the Powell field had been pumped dry and was abandoned.

== See also ==
- List of oil fields
