= Christy McGinity Gibel =

American actress and reality star (born 1977)

Christy McGinity
- Born: August 19, 1977 (age 47); Burbank, California
- Occupation(s): Reality Star, actress
- Spouse: Todd Gibel (m. 2014-div. 2020)
- Children: 3

Christy McGinity (born August 19, 1977, in Burbank, California) is an American actress and reality star known for Death to Smoochy and Little Women: LA.

== Personal life ==
Christy McGinity was married to Todd Gibel since May 16, 2014. In 2019, she asked for an annulment from their marriage.

She has two children from her first marriage. She gave birth to a girl named Violet Eva Carazo on March 6, 2020, with her partner, Gonzalo Carazo. The child passed two weeks later.

== Career ==
Gibel stars on Little Women: LA and has also appeared as herself on RuPaul's Drag Race.

She has worked as an actress on such television shows as Ghost Whisperer and MADtv and her first film role came in Death to Smoochy.
