= Little Women: LA =

American reality TV series (2014–19)

- The cast of Season 3 (left–right): Briana, Jasmine, Christy, Brittney, Tonya, Elena, Terra
- Genre: Reality TV
- Created by: Terra Jolé
- Starring: Tonya Banks; Elena Gant; Traci Harrison Tsou; Terra Jolé; Christy McGinity; Briana Manson; Jasmine Arteaga Sorge; Brittney Guzman
- Opening theme: "Take Me Away" by Clooney
- Country of origin: United States
- Original language: English
- No. of seasons: 8
- No. of episodes: 138

Production
- Executive producers: Kathleen Burns; Chris Coelen; Mary Donahue; Katie Griffin; Greta Gerwig; Terra Jolé; Eli Lehrer; Karrie Wolfe
- Camera setup: Multiple
- Running time: 42 minutes
- Production company: Kinetic Content

Original release
- Network: Lifetime
- Release: May 27, 2014 – August 15, 2019

Related
- Little Women: NY; Little Women: Terra's Little Family; Little Women: Atlanta; Little Women: Dallas

Little Women: LA is an American reality television series that debuted on May 27, 2014, on Lifetime. The series chronicles the lives of a group of women with dwarfism living in Los Angeles.

== Cast ==
Main cast	Seasons							
Main cast	1	2	3	4	5	6	7	8
Terra Jolé	Main							
Tonya Renée Banks	Main							
Elena Gant	Main							
Christy McGinity	Main							
Briana Manson	Main							
Traci Harrison Tsou	Main							
Jasmine Arteaga Sorge			Main					
Brittney Guzman			Main			Guest		
Mika Aguilar Winkler							Recurring	

== Episodes ==
=== Series overview ===
Season	Episodes	Originally released	
Season	Episodes	First released	Last released
1	9	May 27, 2014	July 22, 2014
2	14	January 1, 2015	April 1, 2015
3	13	July 29, 2015	October 21, 2015
4	17	January 27, 2016	May 18, 2016
5	19	July 13, 2016	November 16, 2016
6	30	February 28, 2017	September 13, 2017
7	18	March 21, 2018	July 25, 2018
8	18	April 4, 2019	August 15, 2019

=== Season 1 (2014) ===
No. overall	No. in season	Title	Original release date	US viewers (millions)
1	1	"The "M" Word"	May 27, 2014	0.82
2	2	"Little Women, Big Drama"	June 3, 2014	0.90
3	3	"Who Do You Think You Are?"	June 10, 2014	0.84
4	4	"The Ex-Factor"	June 17, 2014	1.18
5	5	"Movin' On Up"	June 24, 2014	N/A
6	6	"She's Booty-ful"	July 1, 2014	1.08
7	7	"Miss-Conception"	July 8, 2014	1.36
8	8	"Sinner Takes All"	July 15, 2014	1.27
9	9	"Here Comes the Bride"	July 22, 2014	1.20

=== Season 2 (2015) ===
No. overall	No. in season	Title	Original release date	US viewers (millions)
10	1	"Baby on Board"	January 1, 2015	1.53
11	2	"Mama Drama"	January 7, 2015	1.06
12	3	"Baby Bump"	January 14, 2015	1.10
13	4	"A Little Fired Up"	January 21, 2015	1.11
14	5	"Stage Fight"	January 28, 2015	1.18
15	6	"The Ex-Files"	February 4, 2015	1.29
16	7	"Pain in the Butt"	February 11, 2015	1.38
17	8	"Into The Woods"	February 18, 2015	1.23
18	9	"Home Wreckers"	February 25, 2015	1.14
19	10	"Little Women, Big Easy"	March 4, 2015	1.19
20	11	"New Orleans, New Engagement?"	March 11, 2015	1.17
21	12	"Friendtervention"	March 18, 2015	1.34
22	13	"Little Women: LA Reunion Special Part 1"	March 25, 2015	1.13
23	14	"Little Women: LA Reunion Special Part 2"	April 1, 2015	1.21

=== Season 3 (2015) ===
No. overall	No. in season	Title	Original release date	US viewers (millions)
24	1	"LA Safari"	July 29, 2015	1.31
25	2	"Big Secrets"	August 5, 2015	1.13
26	3	"Seattle or Bust"	August 12, 2015	1.18
27	4	"A Group Divided"	August 19, 2015	1.32
28	5	"Love and War"	August 26, 2015	1.56
29	6	"Working Girls"	September 2, 2015	1.32
30	7	"Friendship on the Rocks"	September 9, 2015	1.30
31	8	"No Pain, No Gain"	September 16, 2015	1.24
32	9	"Off to the Races"	September 23, 2015	0.93
33	10	"Bachelorette or Burst"	September 30, 2015	0.99
34	11	"Truth and Lies"	October 7, 2015	1.05
35	12	"Hawaiian Couples Retreat"	October 14, 2015	1.07
36	13	"Big Vow Renewal"	October 21, 2015	1.05

=== Season 4 (2016) ===
No. overall	No. in season	Title	Original release date	US viewers (millions)
37	1	"MotoCrossed"	January 27, 2016	1.26
38	2	"Beauty Brawl"	February 3, 2016	1.34
39	3	"Sour Apples"	February 10, 2016	1.41
40	4	"Oh Baby!"	February 17, 2016	1.33
41	5	"Couples Party Catastrophe"	February 24, 2016	1.45
42	6	"Special Pizza Delivery"	March 2, 2016	1.62
43	7	"Hostile Housewarming"	March 9, 2016	1.42
44	8	"Cancun or Bust"	March 16, 2016	1.36
45	9	"The Party Continues"	March 23, 2016	1.50
46	10	"Crossing the Line"	March 30, 2016	1.22
47	11	"Media Frenzy"	April 6, 2016	1.06
48	12	"Ride or Die Wedding"	April 13, 2016	1.13
49	13	"Baby Showers and Blindsides"	April 20, 2016	1.43
50	14	"Reunion Part 1"	April 27, 2016	N/A
51	15	"Reunion Part 2"	May 4, 2016	1.31
52	16	"Matt and Briana - Part 1"	May 11, 2016	1.04
53	17	"Matt and Briana - Part 2"	May 18, 2016	0.98

=== Season 5 (2016) ===
No. overall	No. in season	Title	Original release date	US viewers (millions)
54	1	"Spa Day Sparring"	July 13, 2016	1.13
55	2	"Drama & Drag Queens"	July 20, 2016	1.20
56	3	"Lost and Found"	July 27, 2016	1.46
57	4	"Twins and Tears"	August 3, 2016	1.45
58	5	"Deconstructive Criticism"	August 10, 2016	1.42
59	6	"Tough as Nails"	August 17, 2016	1.38
60	7	"Wild West Showdown"	August 24, 2016	1.50
61	8	"Pre-Pop Party"	August 31, 2016	1.49
62	9	"Murder She Wrote"	September 7, 2016	1.64
63	10	"Plastic Problems"	September 14, 2016	1.57
64	11	"Birthday Blowout"	September 21, 2016	1.41
65	12	"Belly Dance Battle"	September 28, 2016	1.45
66	13	"Terra's Growing Family"	October 5, 2016	1.47
67	14	"Name Game"	October 12, 2016	1.55
68	15	"High Stakes Friendship"	October 19, 2016	1.36
69	16	"Playing With Fire"	October 26, 2016	1.34
70	17	"Sail Away"	November 2, 2016	1.23
71	18	"Reunion, Part 1"	November 9, 2016	1.07
72	19	"Reunion, Part 2"	November 16, 2016	1.18

=== Season 6 (2017) ===
No. overall	No. in season	Title	Original release date	US viewers (millions)
73	1	"Ballroom Blitz"	February 28, 2017	0.91
74	2	"Tough Crowd"	March 7, 2017	0.88
75	3	"Things Fall Apart"	March 14, 2017	0.99
76	4	"On Thin Ice"	March 21, 2017	0.95
77	5	"The Girl Who Cried Divorce"	March 28, 2017	1.06
78	6	"Vision Quest"	April 4, 2017	0.95
79	7	"Big Little Lies"	April 4, 2017	1.01
80	8	"March Madness"	April 11, 2017	0.97
81	9	"Bringing Sexy Back"	April 18, 2017	0.93
82	10	"Model Behavior"	April 25, 2017	0.92
83	11	"Shady Business"	May 2, 2017	1.01
84	12	"Baptism Blowout"	May 9, 2017	1.02
85	13	"Fractured Friendships"	May 16, 2017	0.94
86	14	"Big Trouble, Little Video"	May 23, 2017	0.88
87	15	"Fierce Fight"	May 31, 2017	1.10
88	16	"Warrior Dash"	June 7, 2017	1.10
89	17	"Alaska Adventure"	June 14, 2017	1.12
90	18	"Interventions and Infidelity"	June 21, 2017	1.04
91	19	"Crazy in Love"	June 28, 2017	1.22
92	20	"'80s Prom"	July 5, 2017	1.09
93	21	"Season 6 Reunion: Part 1"	July 12, 2017	1.17
94	22	"Season 6 Reunion: Part 2"	July 19, 2017	1.16
95	23	"Couples Retreat: Trouble in Paradise"	July 26, 2017	0.87
96	24	"Couples Retreat: Express Yourself"	August 2, 2017	1.14
97	25	"Couples Retreat: Breakfast Beef"	August 9, 2017	0.80
98	26	"Couples Retreat: Don't Poke the Bear"	August 16, 2017	0.88
99	27	"Couples Retreat: Busting Up"	August 23, 2017	0.98
100	28	"Couples Retreat: Twin Explosions"	August 30, 2017	0.93
101	29	"Couples Retreat: Flight or Fight"	September 6, 2017	0.85
102	30	"Couples Retreat: Girls on Top"	September 13, 2017	0.86

=== Season 7 (2018) ===
No. overall	No. in season	Title	Original release date	US viewers (millions)
103	1	"Lucky 7"	March 21, 2018	0.79
104	2	"The Boss is Back"	March 28, 2018	0.71
105	3	"The Blame Game"	April 4, 2018	0.75
106	4	"Sour Grapes"	April 11, 2018	0.70
107	5	"Injections And Rejections"	April 18, 2018	0.79
108	6	"Backstabbing Beauties"	April 25, 2018	0.82
109	7	"Sober Celebration"	May 2, 2018	0.70
110	8	"Sundae Funday"	May 9, 2018	0.64
111	9	"Lil Panty Droppers"	May 16, 2018	0.77
112	10	"Get Happy"	May 23, 2018	0.64
113	11	"The Ultimatum"	May 30, 2018	0.76
114	12	"Stage Fright And Heartache"	June 6, 2018	0.73
115	13	"Extreme Therapy"	June 13, 2018	0.76
116	14	"Welcome to Solvang"	June 20, 2018	0.70
117	15	"Sideways in Solvang"	June 27, 2018	0.75
118	16	"Kicking And Screaming"	July 11, 2018	0.80
119	17	"Beauty And The Booze"	July 18, 2018	0.72
120	18	"Sins And The City"	July 25, 2018	0.80

=== Season 8 (2019) ===
No. overall	No. in season	Title	Original release date	US viewers (millions)
121	1	"Uphill Battle"	April 4, 2019	0.58
122	2	"Rollin' with the Homies"	April 11, 2019	0.71
123	3	"Ghost, Guns, Girls Trip"	April 18, 2019	0.59
124	4	"Hoarders and Performers"	April 25, 2019	0.59
125	5	"Little Issues"	May 2, 2019	0.62
126	6	"Marriage on the Rocks"	May 9, 2019	0.61
127	7	"Chili Dog Dreams"	May 16, 2019	0.58
128	8	"Hen Party Fiasco"	May 23, 2019	0.70
129	9	"I Do's and Don'ts"	July 11, 2019	0.70
130	10	"Social Media Intervention"	July 18, 2019	0.77
131	11	"Meddling Queen"	July 25, 2019	0.54
132	12	"The Snowball Effect"	July 25, 2019	0.57
133	13	"Russian Roulette"	August 1, 2019	0.59
134	14	"Truth and Dare"	August 1, 2019	0.57
135	15	"Totally Shady"	August 8, 2019	0.64
136	16	"Barring It All"	August 8, 2019	0.66
137	17	"Big Little Retreat"	August 15, 2019	0.65
138	18	"The End of an Era"	August 15, 2019	0.72
