= Little Women: NY =

American reality television series

- Genre: Reality television
- Starring: Lila Call; Misty Irwin; Jordanna James; Dawn Lang; Jazmin Lang; Jason Perez; Kristin Zettlemoyer; Jessica Capri; Katie Snyder
- Country of origin: United States
- Original language: English
- No. of seasons: 2
- No. of episodes: 17

Production
- Executive producers: Christ Coelen; Karrie Wolfe; Katie Griffin; Elizabeth Grizzle Voorhees; Kathleen Burns; Terra Jolé; Eli Lehrer; Mary Donahue; Mariana Flynn
- Camera setup: Multiple
- Running time: 42 minutes
- Production company: Kinetic Content

Original release
- Network: Lifetime
- Release: March 25, 2015 – June 15, 2016

Related
- Little Women: LA; Little Women: Atlanta; Little Women: Dallas; Little Women: Terra's Little Family

Little Women: NY is an American reality television series that debuted on Lifetime on March 25, 2015, and concluded on June 15, 2016. It is the first spin-off series of Little Women: LA, except the series chronicles the life of a group of little women living in New York City. The second season of Little Woman: NY premiered on May 4, 2016, with Jessica Capri and Katie Snyder replacing Misty Irwin, Jordanna James, and Kristin Zettlemoyer. Regardless of the title, both seasons featured male cast member Jason Perez.

== Episodes ==
=== Series overview ===
Season	Episodes	Originally released	
Season	Episodes	First released	Last released
1	10	March 24, 2015	May 27, 2015
2	7	May 4, 2016	June 15, 2016

=== Season 1 (2015) ===
No. overall	No. in season	Title	Original release date	US viewers (millions)
1	1	"Big City, Little Women"	March 24, 2015	1.1
2	2	"Moving Out"	April 1, 2015	1.1
3	3	"Burlesque Brawl"	April 8, 2015	1.2
4	4	"Mardi Gras Melee"	April 15, 2015	1.1
5	5	"The Intervention"	April 22, 2015	1.2
6	6	"Cabin Fever"	April 29, 2015	1.0
7	7	"The Little People Fashion Show"	May 6, 2015	1.0
8	8	"The Vagina Monologues"	May 13, 2015	1.0
9	9	"Puerto Rico Fever"	May 20, 2015	1.0
10	10	"The Big Question"	May 27, 2015	0.8

=== Season 2 (2016) ===
No. overall	No. in season	Title	Original release date	US viewers (millions)
11	1	"New Roommates, New Drama"	May 4, 2016	N/A
12	2	"Agree to Disagree"	May 11, 2016	N/A
13	3	"Into the Wild"	May 18, 2016	N/A
14	4	"A Rough Patch"	May 25, 2016	N/A
15	5	"Jason Gets His Groove Back"	May 25, 2016	N/A
16	6	"It's Go Time"	June 8, 2016	N/A
17	7	"The Newest Little Person"	June 15, 2016	N/A
