= Daytime Emmy Award for Outstanding Special Class Writing =

American TV writing award

The Daytime Emmy Award for Outstanding Special Class Writing is an Emmy award honoring writing in special television programming. Both series and specials are eligible for this category.

== Winners and Nominees ==
Winners in bold

=== Outstanding Writing for a Daytime Special Program ===
==== 1970s ====
1974

- **Lila Garrett** and **Sandy Krinski** - The ABC Afternoon Playbreak ("Mother of the Bride") (ABC)
  - Art Wallace - The ABC Afternoon Playbreak ("Alone with Terror") (ABC)
  - Robert J. Shaw - CBS Daytime 90 ("Once in her Life") (CBS)

1975

- **Audrey Davis Levin** - The ABC Afternoon Playbreak ("Heart in Hiding") (ABC)
  - Ruth Brooks Flippen - The ABC Afternoon Playbreak ("Oh, Baby, Baby, Baby...") (ABC)
  - Lila Garrett and Sandy Krinski - The ABC Afternoon Playbreak ("The Girl Who Couldn't Lose") (ABC)

1976

- **Audrey Davis Levin** - First Ladies Diaries ("Edith Wilson") (NBC)
  - Ethel Frank - First Ladies Diaries ("Martha Washington") (NBC)

=== Outstanding Achievement in Coverage of Special Events - Writing ===
==== 1980s ====
1981

- Barry Downes - Macy’s Thanksgiving Day Parade (NBC)

1982

- **Bernard Eismann** - The Body Human ("The Loving Process: Women") (CBS)

=== Special Classification of Outstanding Individual Achievement - Writers ===
==== 1980s ====
1980

- Team - The Hollywood Squares (NBC)

1981

- **Merrill Markoe, Rich Hall, David Letterman, Gerard Mulligan, Paul Raley, Ron Richards** - The David Letterman Show (NBC)
- Betty Cornfield, Mary Ann Donahue, and Edward Tivnan - FYI: For Your Information (ABC)
- Team - The Hollywood Squares (NBC)

1982

- **Team** - FYI: For Your Information (SYN)

1983

- Team - FYI: For Your Information (SYN)

1984

- Team - FYI: For Your Information (SYN)

1985

- Helen Marmor - Hong Kong on Borrowed Time (NBC)
- Team - Breakaway (SYN)
- Team - One to Grow On (NBC)

1986

- **Catherine Faulconer** - Chagall's Journey (NBC)
  - Jane Paley - ABC Notebook ("War In The Family") (ABC)
  - Peter Restivo - Soap Opera Special (SYN)
  - Team - Jeopardy! (SYN)
  - Team - One to Grow On (NBC)

1987

- Team - Jeopardy! (SYN)
- Team - One to Grow On (NBC)
- John William Corrington and Joyce Hooper Corrington - Superior Court (SYN)
- Ben Logan - Taking Children Seriously (NBC)

1988

- David Forman and Barry Adelman - Soap Opera Digest Awards (NBC)
- Team - Scrabble (NBC)
- Team - The Wil Shriner Show (SYN)

=== Outstanding Special Class Writing ===
==== 1980s ====
1989

- Scott J.T. Frank and Tom Avitabile - When I Grow Up (CBS)
- David Forman and Barry Adelman - Soap Opera Digest Awards (NBC)

==== 1990s ====
1990

- **Robert Kirk** - Remembering World War II ("Pearl Harbor") (SYN)
- **Glenn Kirschbaum** - Remembering World War II ("Hitler: Man & Myth") (SYN)
  - Team - The Home Show (ABC)
  - Hester Mundis and Toem Perew - The Joan Rivers Show (SYN)
  - David Forman and Barry Adelman - Soap Opera Digest Awards (NBC)

1991

- **Team** - Jeopardy! (SYN)
  - Joan Rivers, Hester Mundis, and Toem Perew - The Joan Rivers Show (SYN)
  - David Forman and Barry Adelman - Soap Opera Digest Awards (NBC)

1992

- **Kerry Millerick**, **Julie Engleman**, and **Neal Rogin** - Spaceship Earth: Our Global Environment (Disney Channel)
  - Team - Jeopardy! (SYN)
  - Joan Rivers, Hester Mundis, and Toem Perew - The Joan Rivers Show (SYN)
  - Robert Thornton - The Streets (ABC)

1993

- **Victoria Costello** - This Island Earth (Disney Channel)
  - Team - Jeopardy! (SYN)
  - Joan Rivers, Hester Mundis, and Toem Perew - The Joan Rivers Show (SYN)

1994

- **Team** - Jeopardy! (SYN)
  - Robert Thornton - Northern Lights (ABC)

1995

- **Bob Carruthers** - Dinosaurs Myths & Reality (Disney Channel)
  - Team - Jeopardy! (SYN)
  - Robert Thornton - Wings as Eagles (ABC)
  - Rosser Mcdonald - Nicaragua: Finding Peace (NBC)

1996

- **Team** - Jeopardy! (SYN)
  - Rosser Mcdonald - Haiti: Mountains and Hopes (NBC)
  - Brad Gyori, Stan Evans, and Mark Tye Turner - Talk Soup (E!)

1997

- **Team** - Jeopardy! (SYN)
  - Team - Leeza (NBC)
  - Brad Gyori, Stan Evans, and John Henson - Talk Soup (E!)

1998

- **Team** - Jeopardy! (SYN)
  - Team - Leeza (NBC)
  - Team - The Rosie O'Donnell Show (SYN)
  - Team - Win Ben Stein's Money (Comedy Central)

1999

- **Team** - Win Ben Stein's Money (Comedy Central)
  - Team - Jeopardy! (SYN)
  - Team - Pop-Up Video (Vh1)
  - Team - The Rosie O'Donnell Show (SYN)
  - Christian McKiernan, Beverly Kopf, and Andrew Smith - The View (ABC)

==== 2000s ====
2000

- **Team** - Win Ben Stein's Money (Comedy Central)
  - Team - Jeopardy! (SYN)
  - Team - Pop-Up Video (Vh1)
  - Team - The Rosie O'Donnell Show (SYN)
  - Christian McKiernan, Beverly Kopf, and Andrew Smith - The View (ABC)

2001

- **Christian McKiernan**, **Julie Siegel**, and **Andrew Smith** - The View (ABC)
  - Team - Pop-Up Video (Vh1)
  - Team - Jeopardy! (SYN)
  - Team - The Rosie O'Donnell Show (SYN)
  - Team - Win Ben Stein's Money (Comedy Central)

2002

- **Team** - Jeopardy! (SYN)
  - Team - Pop-Up Video (Vh1)
  - Team - Spyder Games (MTV)
  - Christian McKiernan, Julie Siegel, and Andrew Smith - The View (ABC)
  - Team - Win Ben Stein's Money (Comedy Central)

2003

- **Team** - Jeopardy! (SYN)
  - Team - Surprise by Design (Discovery Channel)
  - Team - Pop-Up Video (Vh1)
  - Christian McKiernan, Julie Siegel, and Andrew Smith - The View (ABC)
  - Team - Win Ben Stein's Money (Comedy Central)

2004

- **Team** - Win Ben Stein's Money (Comedy Central)
  - Team - The Ellen DeGeneres Show (SYN)
  - Team - Jeopardy! (SYN)
  - Christian McKiernan, Julie Siegel, and Andrew Smith - The View (ABC)

2005

- **Team** - The Ellen DeGeneres Show (SYN)
  - Team - Jeopardy! (SYN)
  - Christian McKiernan, Julie Siegel, and Andrew Smith - The View (ABC)

2006

- **Team** - The Ellen DeGeneres Show (SYN)
  - Alex Paen - Animal Rescue (SYN)

2007

- **Team** - The Ellen DeGeneres Show (SYN)
  - John Scheinfeld - Biography ("Child Stars: Teen Rockers") (A&E)
  - Alex Paen - Animal Rescue (SYN)

2008

- **Christian McKiernan**, **Janette Barber**, and **Andrew Smith** - The View (ABC)
  - Team - The Ellen DeGeneres Show (SYN)
  - Scott Gardner - Today's Homeowner with Danny Lipford (SYN)

2009

- **David Dunlop and Connie Simmons** - Landscapes Through Time with David Dunlop (PBS)
  - Alex Paen - Animal Rescue (SYN)
  - Mark Waxman - Macy’s Thanksgiving Day Parade (NBC)
  - Laura McKenzie - Laura McKenzie's Traveler (SYN)
  - Team - The Ellen DeGeneres Show (SYN)

==== 2010s ====
2010

- **Michael Stevens**, **Sara Lukinson**, and **George Stevens Jr.** - We Are One: The Obama Inaugural Celebration at the Lincoln Memorial (HBO)
  - Team - The Bonnie Hunt Show (SYN)
  - Alex Paen - Animal Rescue (SYN)
  - Team - The Ellen DeGeneres Show (SYN)

2011

- **Team** - The Ellen DeGeneres Show (SYN)
  - Chip Ward and Darley Newman - Equitrekking (PBS)
  - Alan J. Weiss, Douglas Arvid Wester, and Deborah Gobble - Teen Kids News (SYN)
  - Team - Rally to Restore Sanity and/or Fear (Comedy Central)

2012

- **Team** - The Ellen DeGeneres Show (SYN)
  - Mark Waxman - Macy's Thanksgiving Day Parade (NBC)
  - Team - Pop-Up Video (Vh1)
  - Christine Ferraro - Sesame Street ("All Together Against Hunger") (PBS)

2013

- **Team** - The Ellen DeGeneres Show (SYN)
  - Chip Ward and Darley Newman - Equitrekking (PBS)
  - Anthony Knighton and Brooke Ninowski - The Joni Show (Daystar)

2014

- **Team** - The Ellen DeGeneres Show (SYN)
  - Andrew Ames and Mercedes Ildefonso Velgot - Born to Explore with Richard Wiese (SYN)
  - Dave Boone - Disney Parks Christmas Day Parade (ABC)
  - Joseph Rosendo - Travelscope (PBS)
  - Erin Zimmerman - Made in Israel (ABC Family)

2015

- **Andrea Levin**, **John Redmann**, and **Anjie Taylor** - The Talk (CBS)
  - Andrew Ames and Mercedes Ildefonso Velgot - Born to Explore with Richard Wiese (SYN)
  - Team - The Ellen DeGeneres Show (SYN)
  - Jim Lichtenstein, Stephanie Himango, and John Murphy - The Henry Ford’s Innovation Nation (CBS)

2016

- **Jim Lichtenstein**, **Stephanie Himango**, and **John Murphy** - The Henry Ford’s Innovation Nation (CBS)
  - Team - 30th Independent Spirit Awards (IFC)
  - Erin Zimmerman - The Hope: The Rebirth of Israel, Part 2 (ABC Family)
  - Bianca Giaever - Videos 4 U: I Love You (This American Life)
  - Vince Sherry - Xploration Earth 2050 (FOX)

2017

- **Tim McKeon**, **Mark De Angelis**, and **Adam Peltzman** - Odd Squad: The Movie (PBS)
  - Brad Lachman and Mark Waxman - Macy's Thanksgiving Day Parade (NBC)
  - Team - The Ellen DeGeneres Show (SYN)
  - Team - 31st Independent Spirit Awards (IFC)
  - John Chester - SuperSoul Shorts ("Maggie the Cow") (OWN)

2018

- **Team - Super Soul Sunday: The Orphan** (OWN)
  - Team - The Ellen DeGeneres Show (SYN)
  - Team - The Henry Ford's Innovation Nation (CBS)
  - Team - Xploration Earth 2050 (SYN)
  - Team - Xploration Outer Space (SYN)

==== 2020s ====
2021

- **Xploration Outer Space** (SYN)
  - The Henry Ford's Innovation Nation (CBS)
  - Life 2.0 (SYN)
  - Lucky Dog with Brandon McMillan (CBS)
  - This Old House (PBS)
  - Rock the Park (SYN)
