= Daytime Emmy Award for Outstanding Special Class Series =

Annual television award

The Daytime Emmy Award for Outstanding Special Class Series is an Emmy award given to television programs that do not "fall into other established categories." Prior to 2000, the category was referred to as Special Class Program and both series and specials competed in the same category. A separate category for singular specials was created in 2000.

== Winners and Nominees ==
Winners in bold

=== Outstanding Daytime Drama Special ===
==== 1970s ====
1974

- **The ABC Afternoon Playbreak** ("The Other Woman") (ABC)
  - The ABC Afternoon Playbreak ("A Special Act of Love") (ABC)
  - CBS Daytime 90 ("Tiger on a Chain") (CBS)

1975

- **The ABC Afternoon Playbreak** ("The Girl Who Couldn't Lose") (ABC)
  - The ABC Afternoon Playbreak ("The Last Bride of Salem") (ABC)

1976

- **First Ladies Diaries** ("Edith Wilson") (NBC)
  - First Ladies Diaries ("Martha Washington") (NBC)
  - First Ladies Diaries ("Rachel Jackson") (NBC)

1977

- **The American Woman: Portraits of Courage** (ABC)

=== Special Classification of Outstanding Program Achievement ===
==== 1970s ====
1978

- **Live from Lincoln Center** ("Recital Of Tenor Luciano Pavarotti From The Met") (PBS)
  - Mutual of Omaha's Wild Kingdom (SYN)
  - Camera Three (CBS)
  - Good Morning America (ABC)

1979

- **Camera Three** (CBS)
  - Beethoven Festival (PBS)
  - Cinematic Eye (PBS)

=== Special Classification - Program Achievements ===
==== 1980s ====
1980

- **FYI: For Your Information** (ABC)
  - Giselle (NBC)
  - New American Bandstand 1965 (ABC)

=== Special Classification of Outstanding Program Achievement ===
==== 1980s ====
1981

- **FYI: For Your Information** (ABC)
  - Good Morning America (ABC)

1982

- **FYI: For Your Information** (ABC)
  - The Body Human ("The Loving Process - Women") (CBS)
  - The Body Human ("The Loving Process - Men") (CBS)

1983

- **New American Bandstand 1965** (ABC)
  - FYI: For Your Information (ABC)

1984

- **FYI: For Your Information** (ABC)
  - I Remember It Well: ABC Daytime's 25th Anniversary Minutes (ABC)
  - New American Bandstand 1965 (ABC)

=== Outstanding Special Class Program ===
==== 1980s ====
1985

- **For Our Times** ("To See A World") (CBS)
  - ABC Notebook ("Teen Suicide") (ABC)
  - New American Bandstand 1965 (ABC)
  - For Our Times ("Family Farms") (CBS)
  - For Our Times ("Is Anyone Listening?") (CBS)
  - For Our Times ("Exiles Who Never Left Home") (CBS)
  - The People's Court (SYN)
  - Tournament of Roses Parade (CBS)
  - Macy's Thanksgiving Day Parade (NBC)

=== Special Classification of Program Achievement ===
==== 1980s ====
1986

- **Chagall's Journey** (NBC)
- **Live from Lincoln Center** ("Chamber Music Society of Lincoln Center with Irene Worth and Horacio Gutierrez") (PBS)
  - For Our Times ("Reality Is Becoming") (CBS)
  - Tournament of Roses Parade (CBS)
  - Living in Hope (NBC)
  - America's Musical Theater ("Treemonisha") (PBS)
  - America's Musical Theater ("The Cradle Will Rock") (PBS)
  - New American Bandstand 1965 (ABC)
  - The People's Court (SYN)

1987

- **ABC Notebook** ("The Children of Ellis Island") (ABC)
- **Taking Children Seriously** (NBC)
- **One to Grow On** (NBC)
  - ABC Notebook ("Learn To Read") (ABC)
  - The 700 Club (SYN)
  - The People's Court (SYN)

=== Outstanding Special Class Program ===
==== 1980s ====
1988 (Winner unknown)

- New American Bandstand 1965 (SYN)
- For Our Times ("From the AIDS Experience: Our Spirits to Heal") (CBS)
- The People's Court (SYN)
- Soap Opera Digest Awards (NBC)
- Macy's Thanksgiving Day Parade (NBC)

1989

- **China: Walls and Bridges** (ABC)
- **James Stewart's Wonderful Life** (HBO)
  - Fight Back! with David Horowitz (SYN)
  - Siskel & Ebert (SYN)
  - Soap Opera Awards (CBS)

==== 1990s ====
1990 (Winner unknown)

- Fight Back! with David Horowitz (SYN)
- Good Morning America (ABC)
- Siskel & Ebert (SYN)
- Soap Opera Awards (NBC)
- The Berlin Celebration Concert (PBS)

1991

- **Live from Lincoln Center** ("Yo-Yo Ma in Concert") (PBS)
  - Good Morning America (ABC)
  - Live from Lincoln Center ("Mozart Bicentennial Birthday Serenade") (PBS)
  - Siskel & Ebert (SYN)

1992

- **Spaceship Earth: Our Global Environment** (Disney Channel)
  - CNN Newsroom (CNN)
  - Macy's Thanksgiving Day Parade (NBC)
  - NBA All-Star Stay in School Jam (NBC)
  - The Streets (ABC)

1993

- **Great Wonders of the World** ("Wonders of Nature") (Disney Channel)
  - This Island Earth (Disney Channel)
  - Live from Lincoln Center ("Chamber Music Society: Masters & Masterpieces") (PBS)
  - What Every Baby Knows (Lifetime)
  - CNN Newsroom (CNN)

1994

- **Macy's Thanksgiving Day Parade** (NBC)
  - Good Morning America (ABC)
  - CNN Newsroom (CNN)
  - The Victory Garden (PBS)

1995

- **Talk Soup** (E!)
  - Good Morning America (ABC)
  - Macy's Thanksgiving Day Parade (NBC)
  - E! News Live (E!)
  - CNN Newsroom (CNN)

1996

- **World AIDS Day Special** (VH1)
  - CNN Newsroom (CNN)
  - E! News Live (E!)
  - Good Morning America (ABC)
  - Talk Soup (E!)

1997

- **Macy's Thanksgiving Day Parade** (NBC)
  - Hollywood Moments (AMC)
  - CNN Newsroom (CNN)
  - E! News Live (E!)
  - Talk Soup (E!)

1998

- **Macy's Thanksgiving Day Parade** (NBC)
  - Behind the Screen with Nick Clooney (AMC)
  - CNN Newsroom (CNN)
  - Judge Judy (SYN)
  - Live from Lincoln Center ("A Celebration of Brahms") (PBS)

1999

- **Macy's Thanksgiving Day Parade** (NBC)
  - Behind the Screen with Nick Clooney (AMC)
  - Judge Judy (SYN)
  - Earth Matters (CNN)
  - Pop Up Video (VH1)

=== Outstanding Special Class Series ===
==== 2000s ====
2000

- **Film Preservation Classics** (AMC)
  - Behind the Screen with John Burke (AMC)
  - CNN Newsroom (CNN)
  - Judge Judy (SYN)
  - Pop Up Video (VH1)

2001

- **Behind the Screen with John Burke** (AMC)
  - A Baby Story (TLC)
  - Celebrity Homes (E!)
  - Judge Judy (SYN)
  - Pop Up Video (VH1)

2002

- **Behind the Screen with John Burke** (AMC)
  - Cool Women in History (WE)
  - Judge Judy (SYN)
  - Pop Up Video (VH1)
  - Trading Spaces (TLC)

2003

- **A Baby Story** (TLC)
  - Breakfast with the Arts (A&E)
  - Judge Judy (SYN)
  - Pop Up Video (VH1)
  - While You Were Out (TLC)

2004

- **When I Was a Girl** (WE)
  - Animal Rescue with Alex Paen (SYN)
  - A Baby Story (TLC)
  - Judge Judy (SYN)
  - Trading Spaces: Boys vs. Girls (NBC)

2005

- **Starting Over** (SYN)
  - Animal Rescue with Alex Paen (SYN)
  - A Baby Story (TLC)
  - Breakfast with the Arts (A&E)
  - Judge Judy (SYN)

2006

- **A Baby Story** (TLC)
  - Animal Rescue with Alex Paen (SYN)
  - Judge Judy (SYN)
  - Starting Over (SYN)
  - Trading Spaces: Boys vs. Girls (NBC)

2007

- **Made** (MTV)
  - Animal Rescue with Alex Paen (SYN)
  - A Baby Story (TLC)
  - Judge Judy (SYN)
  - Starting Over (SYN)

2008

- **Made** (MTV)
  - Cause Effect (MTVU)
  - Instant Beauty Pageant (Style)
  - Samantha Brown: Passport to Latin America (Travel)
  - Split Ends (Style)

2009

- **True Life** (MTV)
  - Equitrekking (PBS)
  - Made (MTV)
  - Split Ends (Style)
  - We Mean Business (A&E)

==== 2010s ====
2010

- **The Relic Hunter with Ian Grant** (Travel)
  - Travelscope (PBS)
  - Ruby (Style)
  - Equitrekking (PBS)
  - Laura McKenzie's Traveler (SYN)

2011

- **Made** (MTV)
  - Housecat Housecall (Animal Planet)
  - Private Sessions (A&E)
  - Too Fat for 15: Fighting Back (Style)

2012

- **Super Soul Sunday** (OWN)
  - Ask This Old House (PBS)
  - Made (MTV)
  - Pop Up Video (VH1)
  - Quiet Campus (MTV)
  - Sanjay Gupta MD (CNN)

2013

- **Made** (MTV)
  - Sanjay Gupta MD (CNN)
  - Super Soul Sunday (OWN)

2014

- **Super Soul Sunday** (OWN)
  - Ask This Old House (PBS)
  - Lucky Dog (CBS)
  - Sanjay Gupta MD (CNN)

2015

- **The Henry Ford’s Innovation Nation** (CBS)
  - Got Your 6 (MTV)
  - Intelligence for Your Life (SYN)
  - Xploration Earth 2050 (SYN)

2016

- **Lucky Dog** (CBS)
  - Crime Watch Daily (SYN)
  - The Henry Ford’s Innovation Nation (CBS)
  - Super Soul Sunday (OWN)
  - Xploration Earth 2050 (SYN)

2017

- **Super Soul Sunday** (OWN)
  - Close Up With The Hollywood Reporter (Sundance TV)
  - Crime Watch Daily With Chris Hansen (SYN)
  - Landscapes Through Time with David Dunlop (PBS)
  - Working in the Theatre (American Theatre Wing)

2018

- **Xploration Earth 2050** (SYN)
  - The Great Big Show (Great Big Story)
  - Lucky Dog (CBS)
  - Roman Atwood's Day Dreams (YouTube Red)
  - Super Soul Sunday (OWN)

2019

- **Variety Studio: Actors on Actors** (PBS)
  - Close Up With The Hollywood Reporter (Sundance TV)
  - Lucky Dog (CBS)
  - Mysteries & Scandals (Oxygen)
  - To Life: How Israeli Volunteers Are Changing the World (Freeform)
  - Working in the Theatre (American Theatre Wing)

==== 2020s ====
2020

- **The Day I Picked My Parents** (A&E)
  - Retro Tech (YouTube Originals)
  - Returning the Favor (Facebook Watch)
  - Super Soul Sunday (OWN)
  - Welcome Home (The CW)
