= Travels with Darley =

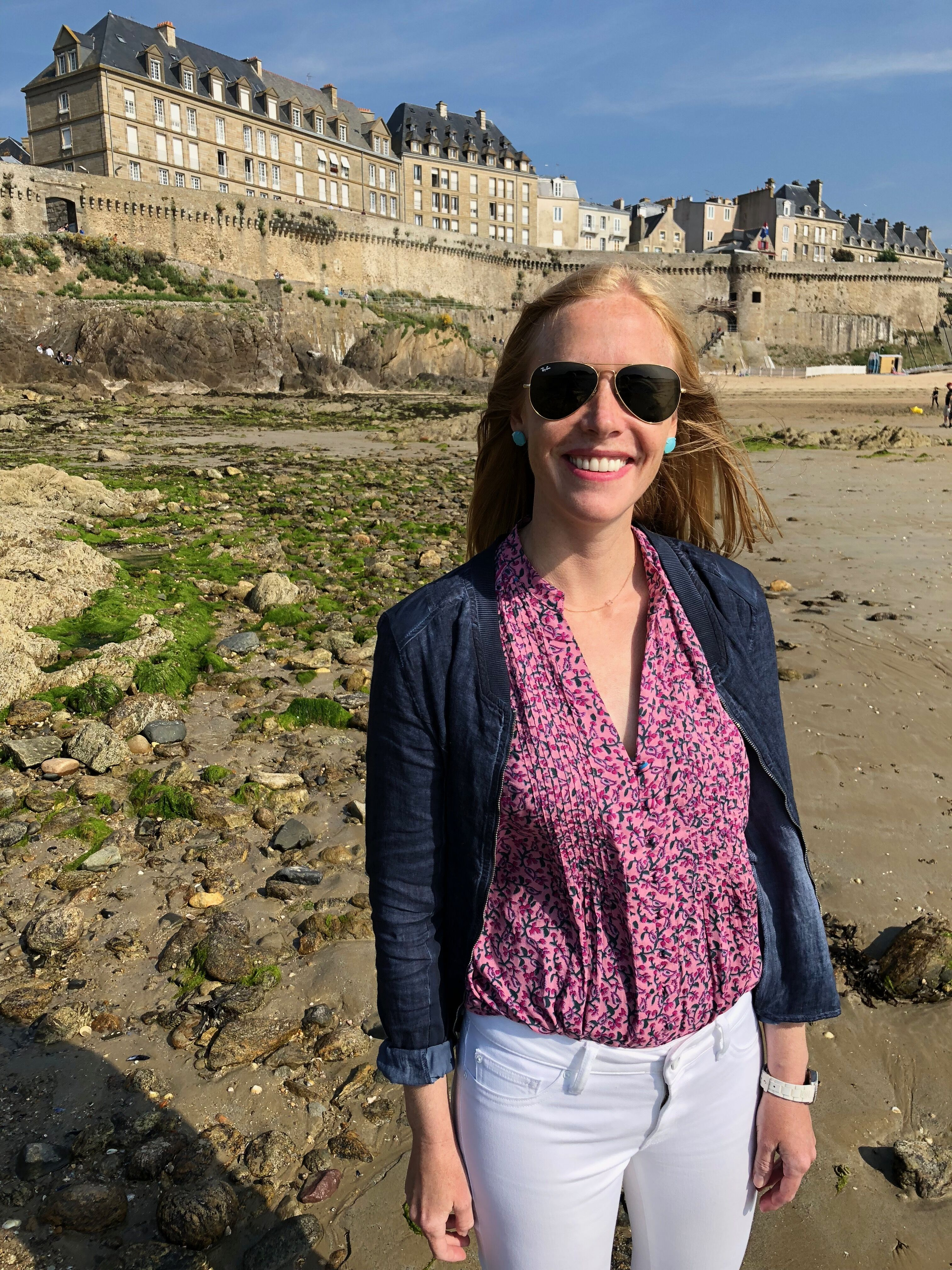
- Host Darley Newman in Saint-Malo during the filming of Travels with Darley Season 6's "Brittany, France" episode in 2018.
- Created by: DCN Creative
- Presented by: Darley Newman
- Country of origin: United States
- No. of seasons: 6
- No. of episodes: 36

Production
- Executive producers: Darley Newman; Chip Ward
- Running time: 30 minutes

Original release
- Network: PBS
- Release: June 1, 2016 – February 27, 2019

Travels with Darley is a PBS and Amazon Prime travel television series. The show is hosted by American Darley Newman and documents Newman's experiences with locals around the world. It premiered on PBS in 2016, taking audiences to Europe, the Caribbean, Asia, and the United States. It can also be viewed on demand on Amazon Prime, Samsung, Koren Airlines, YouTube, and Roku. The series has additionally appeared on international broadcast networks as well as on over 2,000 partner sites such as MSN and HuffPost. Since its debut, the program has aired thirteen seasons, and the fourteenth (including the 100th episode) will premiere in January 2027.

== Episodes ==
=== Season 1 (2016) ===
No. in series	Title	Original air date
1	"Guadeloupe Islands Caribbean Adventures"	June 1, 2016
2	"Maryland's Eastern Shore"	June 8, 2016
3	"Belgium: Castles, Cities & Countryside"	June 15, 2016
4	"Belgium: Brussels & Beyond"	June 22, 2016
5	"Southern States Road Trip"	June 29, 2016
6	"Michigan's Upper Peninsula"	July 6, 2016
7	"Road Trip: Maryland, Virginia and South Carolina"	July 13, 2016
8	"Guadeloupe Islands Caribbean Escape"	July 20, 2016

=== Season 2 (2016) ===
No. in series	Title	Original air date
9	"England: Manchester, Liverpool & the Lake District"	September 22, 2016
10	"Wales: Isle of Anglesey & the Coast"	September 29, 2016
11	"Northern England and Wales"	October 6, 2016
12	"Little Rock, Arkansas"	October 13, 2016
13	"Hong Kong Island Hopping"	October 20, 2016

=== Season 3 (2017) ===
No. in series	Title	Original air date
14	"Martinique Adventures"	March 13, 2017
15	"Hong Kong Urban Adventures"	March 20, 2017
16	"Wyoming National Forests"	March 27, 2017
17	"Route 66: Illinois & Midewin"	March 3, 2017
18	"Illinois: Ottawa & Beyond"	April 10, 2017

=== Season 4 (2017) ===
No. in series	Title	Original air date
19	"West Virginia Adventures"	September 25, 2017
20	"France's Western Front Part I"	October 2, 2017
21	"France's Western Front Part II"	October 9, 2017
22	"Missouri's Route 66 & St. Louis"	October 16, 2017
23	"Tokyo, Japan"	October 23, 2017
24	"Martinique Caribbean Culture"	October 30, 2017

=== Season 5 (2018) ===
No. in series	Title	Original air date
25	"New York's Southern Finger Lakes"	March 16, 2018
26	"New Mexico's Continental Divide Trail"	March 23, 2018
27	"Santa Fe Arts & Culture"	March 30, 2018
28	"Finger Lakes & Monogahela Forests"	April 6, 2018
29	"French Riviera"	April 13, 2018
30	"Santa Fe Adventures"	April 20, 2018

=== Season 6 (2019) ===
No. in series	Title	Original air date
31	"California's Central Coast"	January 23, 2019
32	"North Dakota"	January 30, 2019
33	"Culpeper, Virginia"	February 6, 2019
34	"Brittany, France"	February 13, 2019
35	"Alabama & Arkansas"	February 20, 2019
36	"Darley's Global Food Guide"	February 27, 2019

== Notable guests and places ==
- Chef Sang-Hoon Diegiembre – In Season 1's "Belgium: Castles, Cities & Countryside" episode, Newman cooks and dines with Chef Sang-Hoon Diegiembre at the two-star Michelin restaurant, L'air du temps in Éghezée, Belgium.
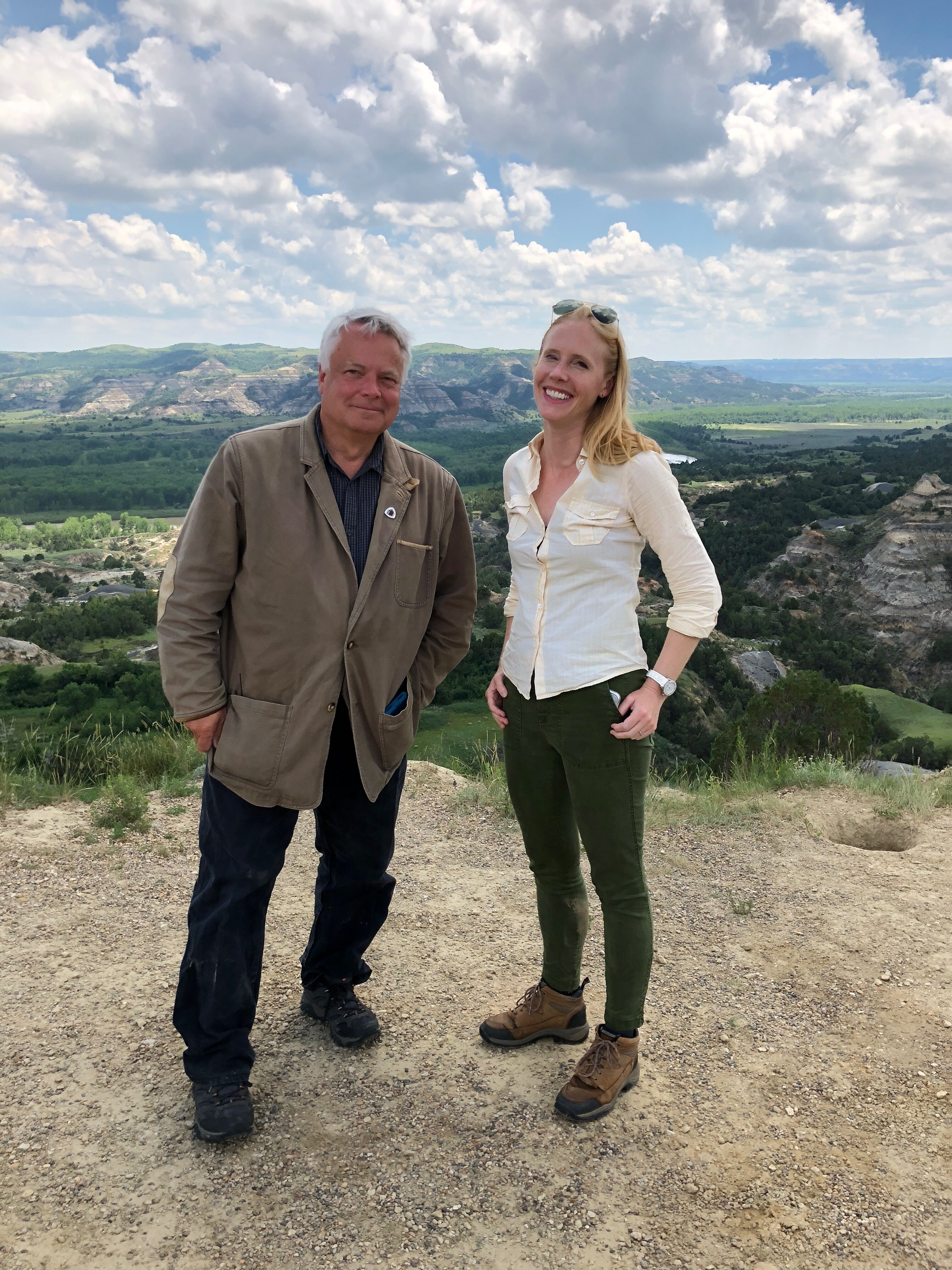
  Newman and Clay Jenkinson in Theodore Roosevelt National Park during the filming of Travels with Darley Season 6's "North Dakota" episode in 2018.
- Chef Matthew McClure – In Season 1's "Southern States Road Trip" episode, Newman cooks and dines with Chef Matthew McClure, a semifinalist for “Best Chef: South” in the James Beard Foundation Awards, at The Hive at The 21c Museum Hotel in Bentonville, Arkansas.
- Gareth Wyn Jones – In Season 2's "Wales: Isles of Anglesey & The Coast" episode, Newman interviews Gareth Wyn Jones, a sheep farmer turned celebrity due to his social media and advocacy work in Conwy, Wales.
- Chef Guy Ferdinand/"Chef Hot Pants" – In Season 3's "Martinique Adventures" episode, Newman cooks and dines with Chef Guy Ferdinand, also known as "Chef Hot Pants," at Le Petibonum, a seafood restaurant located on a black sand beach in Le Carbet, Martinique.
- Chef Mango Tsang Chiu Lit – In Season 3's "Hong Kong Urban Adventures," Newman cooks and dines with Chef Mango Tsang Chiu Lit at Michelin-star restaurant, Ming Court at the Cordis Hotel in Hong Kong.
- Ottawa Mayor Robert M. Eschbach – In Season 3's "Illinois: Ottawa & Beyond" episode, Newman goes on a biking tour of the city of Ottawa, Illinois with Mayor Robert M. Eschbach.
- Restaurateur Florence Jaramillo – In Season 5's "Santa Fe Adventures" episode, Newman eats with Restaurateur Florence Jamillo at Jamillo's restaurant, Rancho de Chimayó Restaurante, a James Beard Foundation Award-winning establishment for American Classic in Chimayó, New Mexico.
- Clay S. Jenkinson – In Season 6's "North Dakota" episode, Newman goes hiking in Theodore Roosevelt National Park with Clay Jenkinson, American humanities scholar, author, and educator from North Dakota known for The Thomas Jefferson Hour.

== Notable events ==
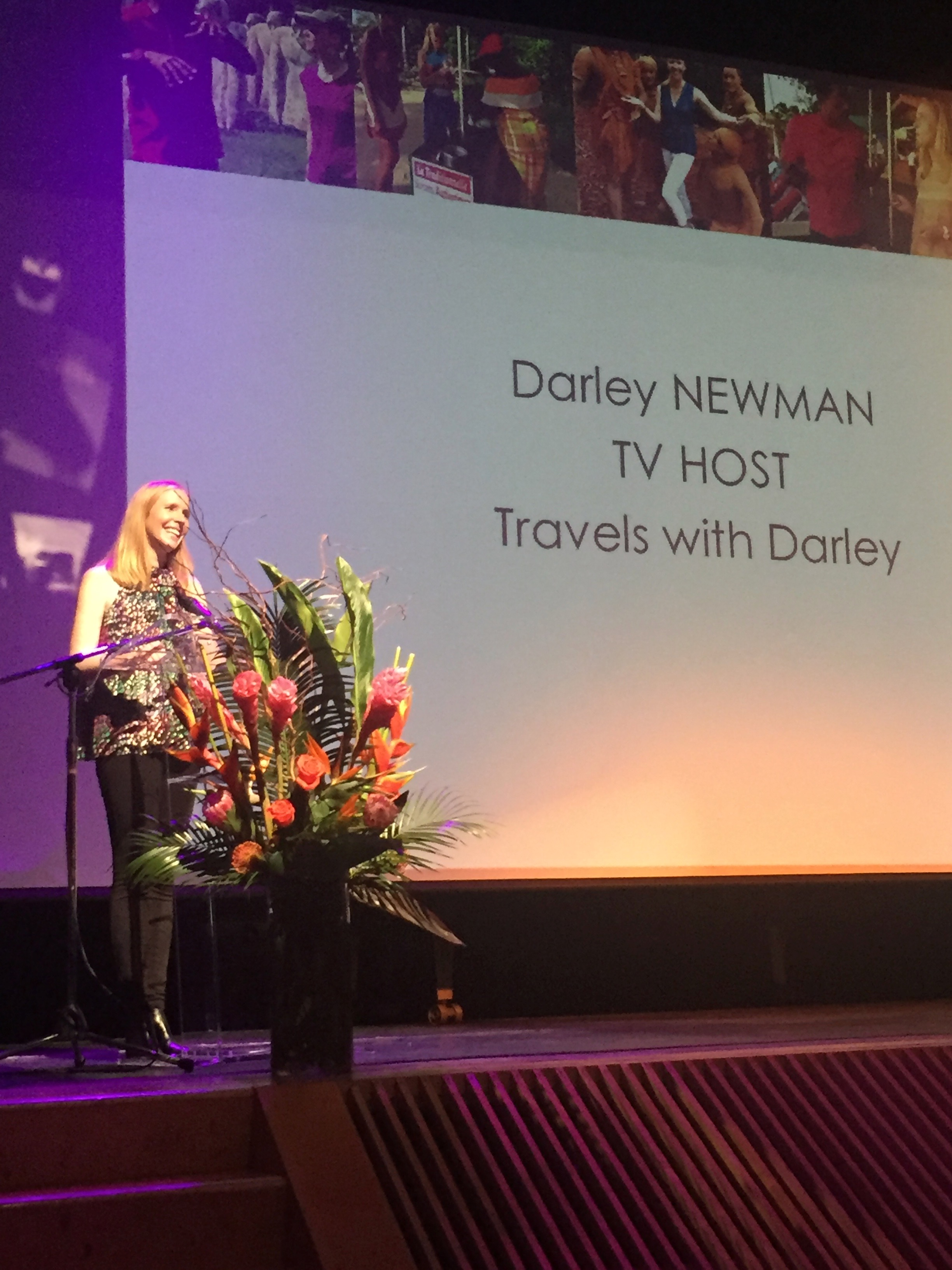
Newman speaking at the French Embassy in Washington, D.C., on February 22, 2017 during the Travels with Darley in Martinique Preview Party.

- February 22, 2016: Travels with Darley Viewing Party at The Cotton Gin in Five Points, Columbia, South Carolina – The Columbia Convention and Visitors Bureau (CVB) and Amy Beth Franks with the Five Points Association invited locals to view an advanced screening of Season 1's "Road Trip: Maryland, Virginia and South Carolina" episode and the chance to meet host Newman. Columbia Mayor Stephen K. Benjamin was in attendance.
- February 23, 2017: Travels with Darley in Martinique Preview Party at the Embassy of France in Washington, D.C. – The Martinique Tourism Authority invited nearly 200 attendees to get an exclusive behind-the-scenes look of the show's filming for Season 3's "Martinique Adventures" episode. Presenters included host Newman, First Counselor of the French Embassy Patrick Lachaussée, General Director of the Martinique Tourism Authority Joëlle Desir, Martinique-based Chef Guy Ferdinand/"Chef Hot Pants," and French Embassy Chef Daniel Labone.
- April 1, 2017: Travels with Darley Screening and Q&A event at The Mar Theatre in Wilmington, Illinois – Organized by Veronica Hinke of the Midewin National Tallgrass Prairie, over 100 people attended this event to get an inside look of both of Season 3's "Route 66: Illinois & Midewin" and "Illinois: Ottawa & Beyond" episodes. Newman was unable to attend but Midewin Archaeologist Joe Wheeler moderated a stand-up Q&A panel featuring locals involved in the production.
- April 9, 2017: Travels with Darley Screening and Q&A Event at Roxy Cinemas in Ottawa, Illinois – The Ottawa CVB and the Heritage Corridor CVB invited guests to watch both of Season 3's "Route 66: Illinois & Midewin" and "Illinois: Ottawa & Beyond" episodes. The Q&A panel was led by Heritage Corridor CVB President and CEO Robert Navarro which included host Newman, Ottawa Mayor Robert M. Eschbach, and Ottawa Visitors Center Executive Director Curt Bedei who also helped organize the event.
- April 11, 2017: Travels with Darley Screening and Q&A Event at the Joliet Area Historical Museum in Joliet, Illinois – This was the third and final Illinois event which invited the public to view both of Season 3's "Illinois Route 66 & Midewin" and "Illinois: Ottawa & Beyond" episodes. After the screening, Executive Director of the Joliet Area Historical Museum Greg Peerbolte held a Q&A with host Newman, her production team, and locals featured on the episodes. Notable guests included Joliet Mayor Bob O'Dekirk and National Forest Foundation Executive Vice President Mary Mitsos.
- September 14, 2017: Tokyo Revealed: PBS Preview with Darley Newman at the Smithsonian in Washington, D.C. – Smithsonian Associates hosted a special premiere party for Travels with Darley Season 4's "Tokyo, Japan" episode held inside the S. Dillon Ripley Center. Host Newman presented attendees with behind-the-scenes clips and insider tips from her trip. Guests were treated to an evening of saké tasting following the screening.
- November 14, 2018: Travels in France with Darley Newman: The Best Beyond Paris at the Smithsonian in Washington, D.C. – Smithsonian Associates hosted an exclusive screening for Travels with Darley Season 6's "Brittany, France" episode held inside the S. Dillon Ripley Center. Host Newman spoke before a sold-out crowd providing insight on her experience filming in Brittany and showing extended footage beyond the episode. There was a reception with French wine and appetizers immediately after the program.

== Awards and nominations ==
- 2018: Caribbean Travel Media Award for Best Broadcast Feature in the Golden Mic category for the "Travels with Darley Martinique" episode of Travels with Darley at the Caribbean Tourism Industry Awards and Fashion Show in New York City
