= Darley Newman =

American producer, television host, writer, and entrepreneur

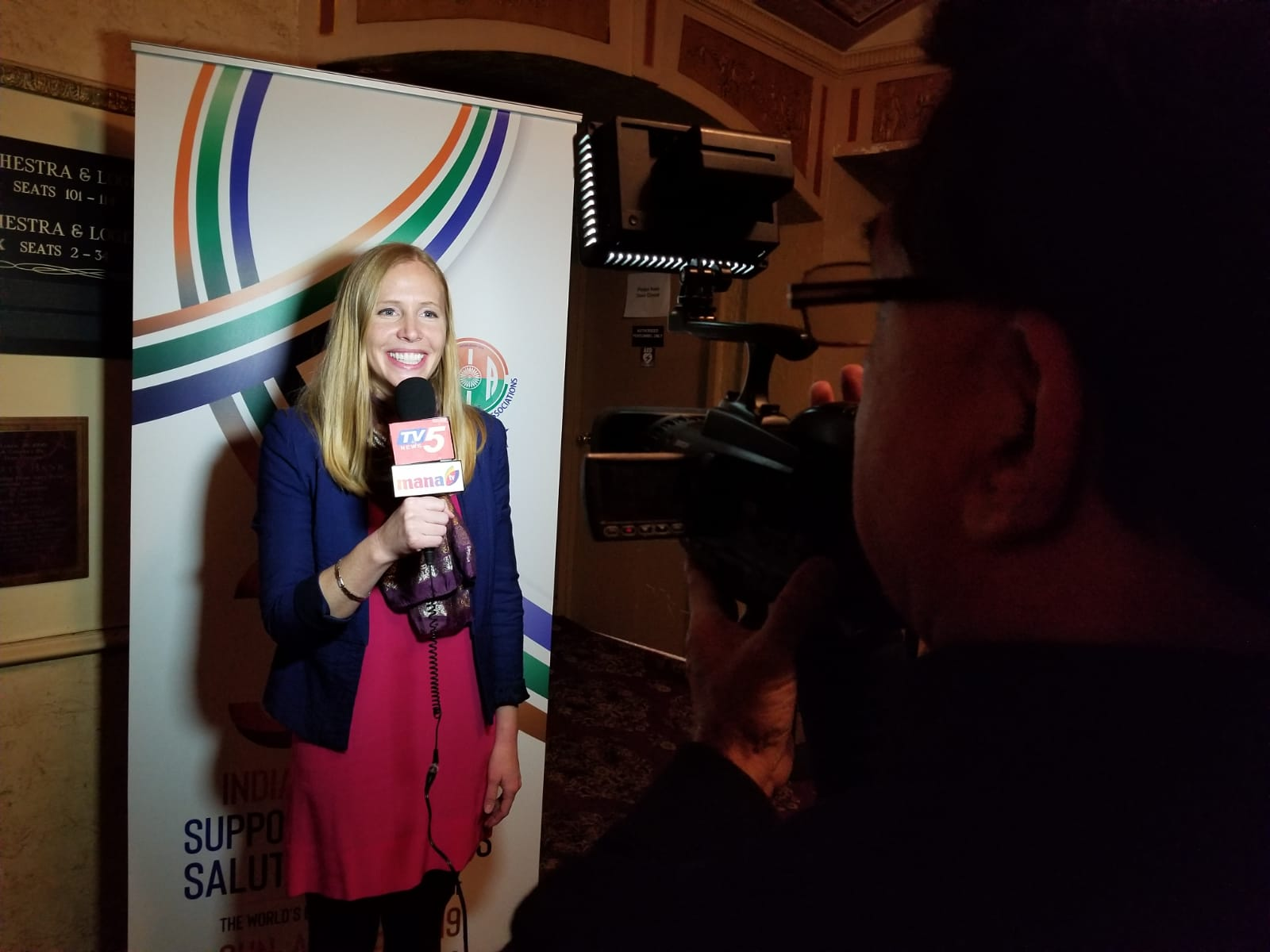
- Newman being interviewed at the Dance Pe Chance celebration at Union County Performing Arts Center in February 2019.
- Born: Darley Carol Newman; Washington, D.C.
- Education: George Washington University
- Occupation(s): producer, TV host, writer, entrepreneur
- Website: darleycnewman.com

Darley Carol Newman is an American producer, television host, writer, and entrepreneur. Newman is the creator and host of Equitrekking, an Emmy Award-winning equestrian themed travel TV show on PBS, and Travels with Darley, a PBS and Amazon Prime series that documents her experiences traveling with the locals around the world.

== Early life ==
Newman was born in Washington, D.C. She grew up in Myrtle Beach, South Carolina, and began horseback riding at the age of nine. In 1997, Newman graduated from St. Catherine's School in Richmond, Virginia. Her grandparents immigrated from both Sweden and Finland.

== Education ==
In 2001, Newman graduated with a Bachelor of Arts degree in electronic media from The George Washington University's School of Media and Public Affairs. Newman created her own minor in international business and cultures. She studied abroad in Florence, Italy for one semester which she credits as one of her favorite travel destinations.

== Career ==
Newman started her career as a cameraperson in a summer job for a local station in South Carolina. Newman became a correspondent for The Talk Radio News Service covering briefings at The White House and meetings at Capitol Hill.

In Washington, D.C., Newman became a programming assistant for WBDC-TV. She was named Tribune Media's "Employee of the Year" in 2002. Newman became a production associate for FRONTLINE and NOW with Bill Moyers broadcast on PBS at Washington Media Associates, a production company.

Newman moved to New York City in 2003. There, she worked on the prime-time news program, 48 Hours, on CBS and also did freelance research and camera work for PBS documentaries and series. During this time, she founded her production company, DCN Creative, and launched the websites, Equitrekking.com and EquitrekkingTravel.com, producing early micro-niche online video for Brightcove that was cited in BusinessWeek's "Blogspotting." While in New York City, she produced the pilot episode of Equitrekking, the first ever travel TV show to explore the world on horseback.

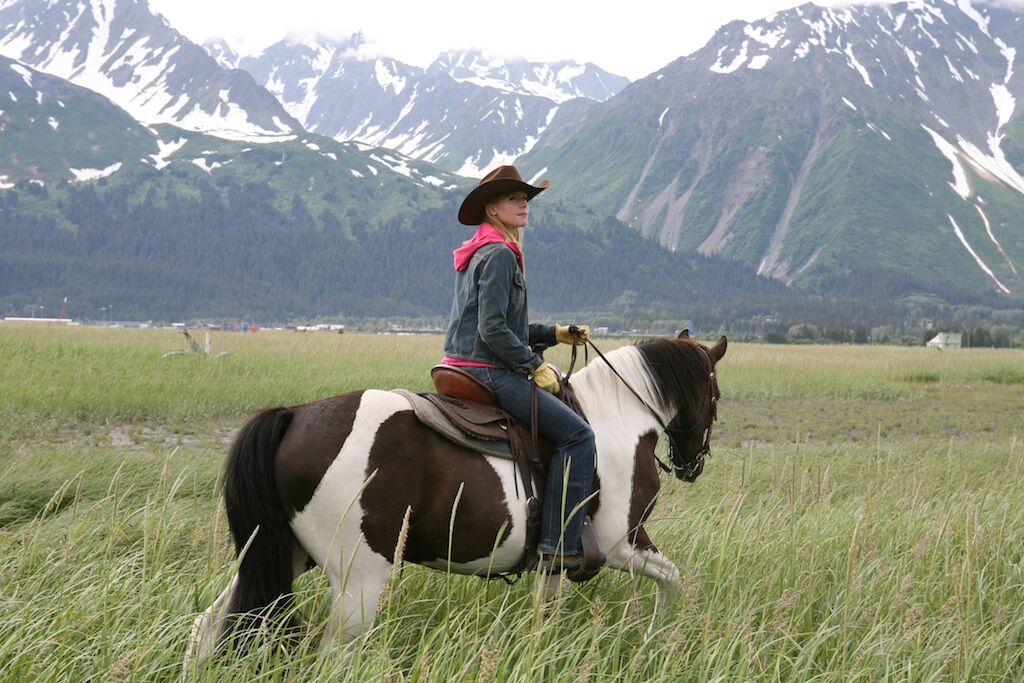
Newman horseback riding in Seward, Alaska during the filming of Equitrekking's "Alaska" episode in 2009

In 2007, Newman moved back to Washington, D.C. to expand her productions with DCN Creative. She created more episodes of Equitrekking, which would go on to be distributed to networks in over 85 nations and win three Daytime Emmy Awards as well as be honored with nine nominations. It has run for five seasons with a total of 35 half-hour episodes to date.

Newman authored Equitrekking: Travel Adventures on Horseback published by Chronicle Books in 2008. She provides readers with recommendations and tips based on her firsthand experiences on equestrian vacations she took with locals. The book went on to win the North American Travel Journalist Award Merit Award for Best Travel Book. Later in the year, Ralph Lauren TV premiered a digital video series with Newman, showcasing Equitrekking spots in Hawaii, Alaska, Ireland and the American West.

Broadening the Equitrekking brand, in 2009, Newman went on to launch Equitrekking's Top20Ranches.com which highlights top North American dude ranches. That same year, she created a series of broadcast interstitials, taking viewers "equitrekking" in locations where famous American Westerns and movies filmed and detailing related history, shown on the Starz Encore network.

In 2014, Newman produced the digital original series "Travel Like the Locals with Darley" for Scripps Network Interactive. She started hosting and producing a second, new digital series, Travels with Darley, launched on the AOL On Network, dedicated to food, culture, and adventures across the globe with locals as the guides. In 2016, Travels with Darley debuted its first season on PBS, taking viewers to Europe, the Caribbean and the United States. It can also be streamed on Amazon Prime and has appeared on international broadcast networks as well as over 2,000 partner sites like MSN and HuffPost. The show has aired 36 half-hour episodes over the span of six seasons and is currently shooting its seventh season.

== Accolades ==
=== Emmy Awards and nominations ===
Year	Association	Nominated work	Result
2009	Daytime Emmy Award for Outstanding Single Camera Photography	Greg Barna for Equitrekking	Won
2009	Daytime Emmy Award for Outstanding Special Class Series	Darley Newman & Chip Ward for Equitrekking	Nominated
2010	Daytime Emmy Award for Outstanding Special Class Series	Darley Newman & Chip Ward for Equitrekking	Nominated
2011	Daytime Emmy Award for Outstanding Special Class Writing	Darley Newman & Chip Ward for Equitrekking	Nominated
2012	Daytime Emmy Award for Outstanding Single Camera Photography	Greg Barna for Equitrekking	Won
2013	Daytime Emmy Award for Outstanding Single Camera Photography	Greg Barna for Equitrekking	Won
2013	Daytime Emmy Award for Outstanding Travel and Adventure Program	Darley Newman & Chip Ward for Equitrekking	Nominated
2013	Daytime Emmy Award for Outstanding Special Class Writing	Darley Newman & Chip Ward for Equitrekking	Nominated
2019	Daytime Emmy Award for Single Camera Directing	Darley Newman & Greg Barna for Travels with Darley	Nominated

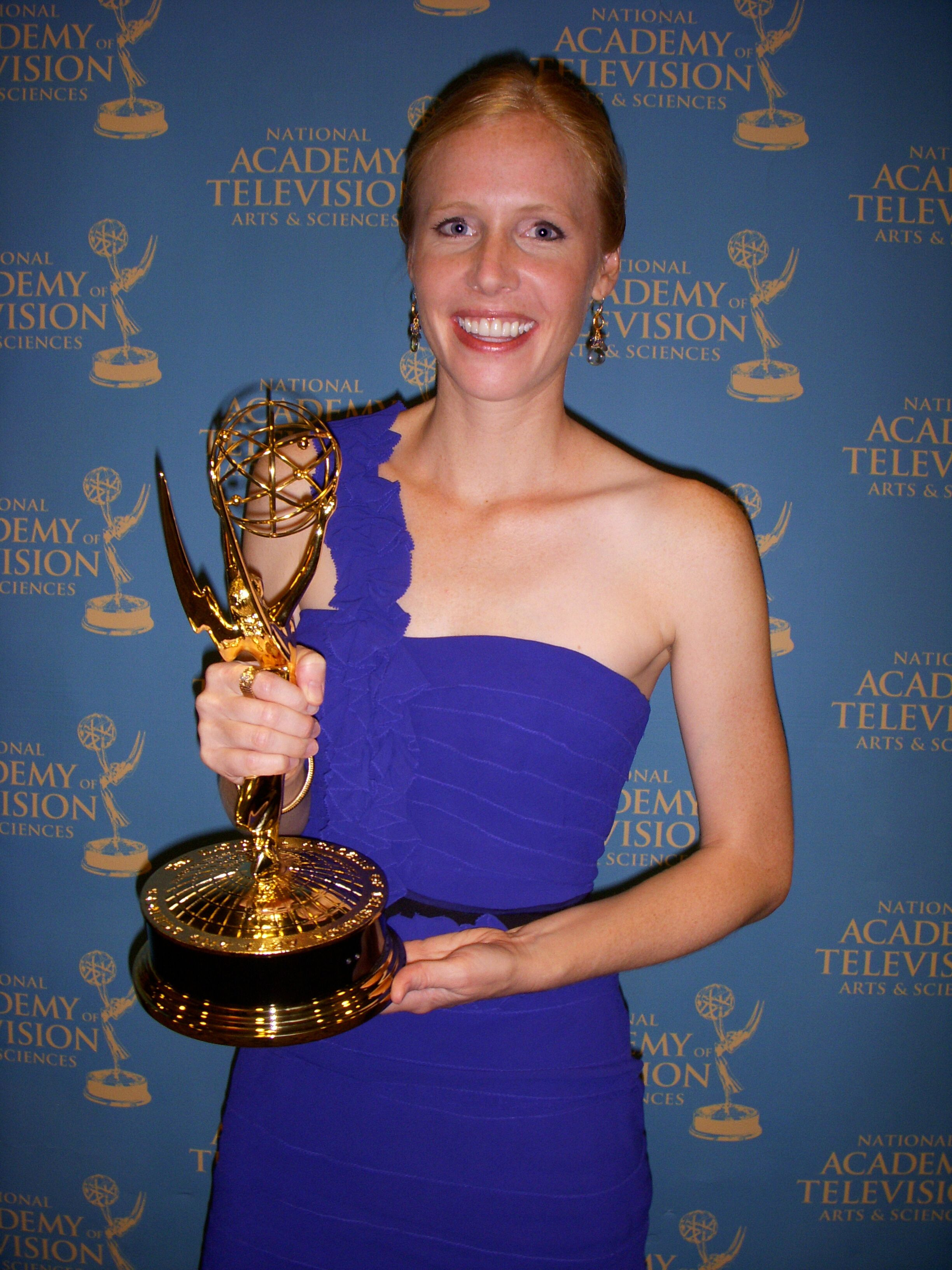
Newman at The 36th Annual Daytime Emmy Awards in 2009

=== Other honors ===
- 2008: North American Travel Journalists Association (NATJA) First Place Award for Best Travel Broadcast (Video) for Equitrekking
- 2008: North American Travel Journalists Association (NATJA) Award of Merit for Best Travel Book for Equitrekking: Travel Adventures on Horseback
- 2009: North American Travel Journalists Association (NATJA) First Place Award for Best Travel Broadcast (Video) for Equitrekking
- 2012: Inspiring Woman Award from Women in Philanthropy & Leadership (WIPL) at a conference hosted by Coastal Carolina University
- 2012: Silver Telly Winner for The Telly Awards' Film/Video TV Programs, Segments, or Promotional Pieces - Videography/Cinematography for DCN Creative's Equitrekking
- 2012: Bronze Telly Winner for The Telly Awards' Film/Video TV Programs, Segments, or Promotional Pieces - Travel/Tourism for DCN Creative's Equitrekking
- 2018: Caribbean Travel Media Award for Best Broadcast Feature in the Golden Mic category for the "Travels with Darley Martinique" episode of Travels with Darley at the Caribbean Tourism Industry Awards and Fashion Show in New York City
