= Consumer Buyline =

Consumer Buyline may refer to:

- Consumer Buyline, originally California Buyline, and later Fight Back! with David Horowitz, American TV programme
- Consumers' Buyline Inc. (CBI), defunct multi-level marketing company
