= Hal Linden =

American actor (born 1931)

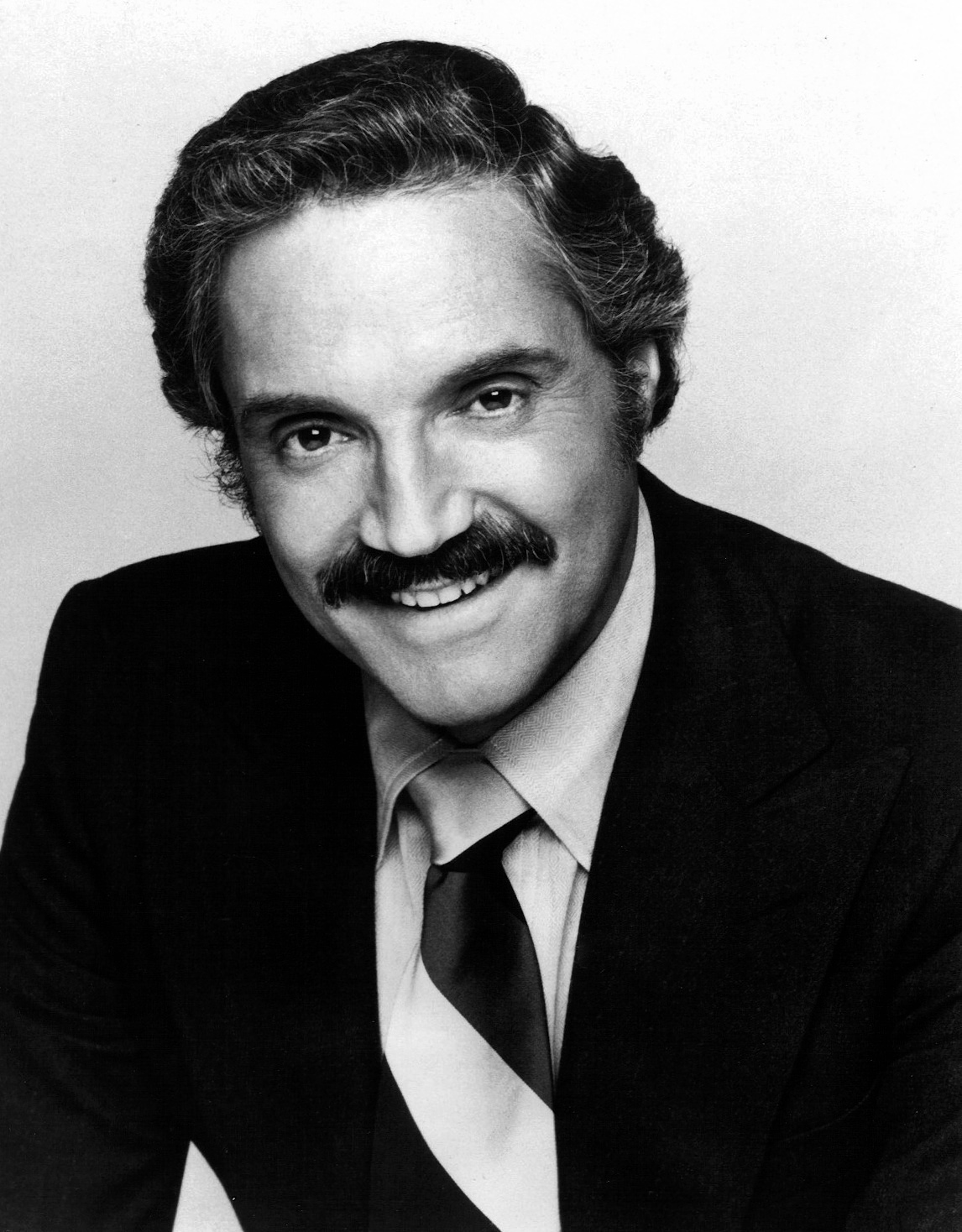
- Publicity photo for FYI (1981)
- Born: Harold Lipshitz; March 20, 1931 (age 95); The Bronx, New York City, U.S.
- Education: High School of Music & Art
- Alma mater: Queens College; City College of New York (BA)
- Occupations: Actor, television director, musician
- Years active: 1956–present
- Spouse: Frances Martin (m. 1958; died 2010)
- Children: 4

Hal Linden (born Harold Lipshitz; March 20, 1931) is an American stage and screen actor, television director and musician.

Linden began his career as a big band musician and singer in the 1950s. After a stint in the United States Army, he began an acting career, first working in summer stock and off-Broadway productions. Linden found success on Broadway when he replaced Sydney Chaplin in the musical Bells Are Ringing. In 1962, he starred as Billy Crocker in the off-Broadway revival of the Cole Porter musical Anything Goes. In 1971, he won a Best Actor Tony Award for his portrayal of Mayer Rothschild in the musical The Rothschilds.

In 1974, Linden landed his best-known role as the title character in the television comedy series Barney Miller. The role earned him seven Primetime Emmy nominations and three Golden Globe Award nominations. During the series' run, Linden also hosted two educational series, Animals, Animals, Animals and FYI. He won two special Daytime Emmy Awards for the latter series. Linden won a third Daytime Emmy Award for a guest-starring role on CBS Schoolbreak Special in 1995. Linden has since continued his career on the stage, in films and guest-starring roles on television. He released his first album of pop and jazz standards, It's Never Too Late, in 2011.

== Early life ==
Hal Linden was born on March 20, 1931, in The Bronx, New York City, New York, the youngest son of Frances (née Rosen) and Charles Lipshitz, a Lithuanian Jew who immigrated to the United States in 1910 and owned a printing shop. Hal's older brother, Bernard, became a professor of music at Bowling Green State University. Linden attended Herman Ridder Junior High School and the High School of Music and Art, going on to study music at Queens College, City University of New York. He later enrolled in Baruch College and then City College of New York, where he received a Bachelor of Arts in business.

During his youth, Linden wanted to be a big band singer and bandleader. Before embarking on a career in music, he decided to change his name, stating, "'Swing and Sway with Harold Lipshitz' just didn't parse." While riding on a bus from Philadelphia to New York through the town of Linden, New Jersey, he saw the name Linden on the water tower and changed his name to Hal Linden. During the 1950s, he toured with Sammy Kaye, Bobby Sherwood, and other big bands of the era. Linden played the saxophone and clarinet and also sang.

He enlisted in the United States Army in 1952 and was sent to Fort Belvoir and played in the United States Army Band. While he was in Fort Belvoir, a friend recommended that he see the touring production of Guys and Dolls playing in Washington, D.C. After seeing the show, Linden decided to become an actor. He was discharged from the Army in 1954.

== Career ==
Linden replaced Sydney Chaplin in the Broadway production of Bells Are Ringing in 1958. He made a further breakthrough on the New York City stage in 1962 when he was cast as Billy Crocker in the revival of Cole Porter's Anything Goes.

Linden's career slowed in the 1960s. During this time, he dubbed English dialogue for various foreign films, did voiceover work for commercials and sang jingles, and performed in industrial musicals such as Diesel Dazzle (1966). His career was revived in the 1970s when he was cast as Mayer Rothschild in the 1971 musical The Rothschilds. The role earned him a Tony Award for Best Actor in a Musical. In 1973, he co-starred opposite Tony Lo Bianco in the NBC television film Mr. Inside/Mr. Outside. The film was intended to be the pilot for a proposed series but was not picked up by the network.

=== Barney Miller ===
In 1974, Linden landed the starring role in the ABC television police sitcom Barney Miller. He portrayed the captain of the 12th Precinct in Greenwich Village, Manhattan, New York City. He earned seven Emmy Award nominations for his work on the series. Linden is tied with Matt LeBlanc and John Goodman for the most Outstanding Lead Actor in a Comedy Series Emmy Award nominations without ever winning. He also earned four Golden Globe Award nominations for Best Actor in a Musical or Comedy. The series aired from 1975 to 1982. Linden later said that leaving Broadway to work on Barney Miller was his most irrational act and also one of his best decisions.

During the run of Barney Miller, Linden served as the narrator and host of the ABC children's shows Animals, Animals, Animals and FYI. He won two Daytime Emmys for Outstanding Individual Achievement for his host work on FYI. in 1984 and 1985.

=== Later career ===
After Barney Miller ended in 1982, Linden appeared in several television films, including I Do! I Do! (1982), the television adaptation of the musical of the same name, and Starflight: The Plane That Couldn't Land (1983). Also in 1982, he was the producers' first choice for the starring role of Dr. Donald Westphall in St. Elsewhere, but he turned down the opportunity without reading the script or meeting the producers because he wanted to take a break from television. (The role was then given to Ed Flanders.)

In 1984, he costarred in the television film Second Edition. The film was intended to be a series but was not picked up by CBS. The following year, Linden portrayed studio head Jack L. Warner in the television biopic My Wicked, Wicked Ways: The Legend of Errol Flynn.

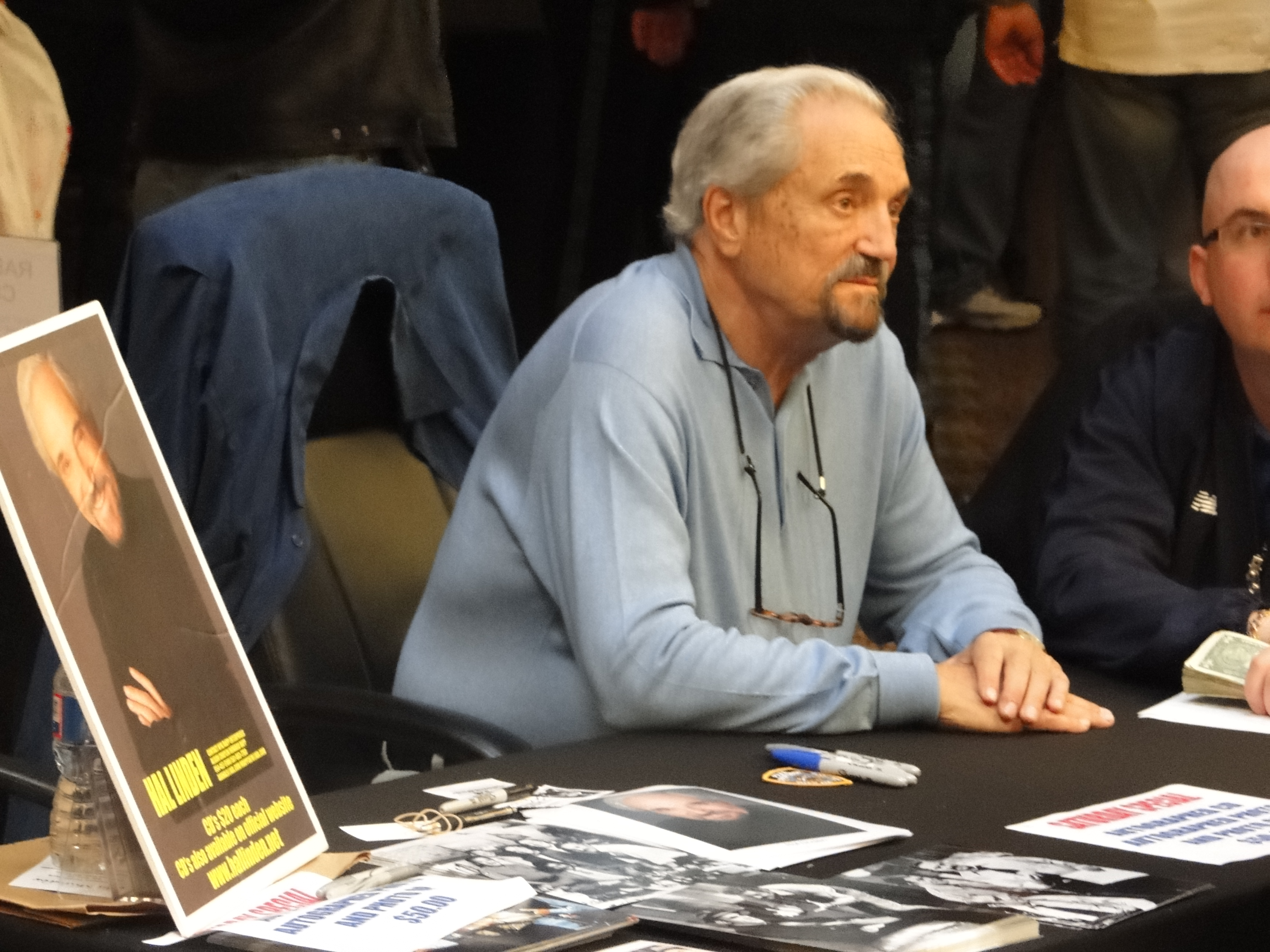
Linden at Chiller Theatre on April 30, 2011

In 1986, Linden returned to episodic television in the NBC series Blacke's Magic. He played the lead character, Alexander Blacke, a magician who solves mysteries with the help of his father Leonard (Harry Morgan), a retired carnival magician and sometimes confidence man. The series was canceled after 13 episodes. In 1988, he co-starred in the romantic comedy A New Life, directed by Alan Alda. In 1991 he guest-starred in an episode of “The Golden Girls” in the part of John Neretti, Bea Arthur's character's love interest. In 1992, Linden tried his hand at television again with the leading role in the comedy-drama series Jack's Place. In the series, Linden portrayed Jack Evans, a retired jazz musician who ran a restaurant that was frequented by patrons who learned lessons about love. The show was often compared to The Love Boat by critics as it featured a different weekly guest star. The series premiered as a mid-season replacement but did well enough in the ratings for ABC to order additional episodes. Viewership soon declined and ABC chose to cancel the series in 1993. The next year, Linden appeared in the CBS sitcom The Boys Are Back. That series was also low rated and canceled after 18 episodes. In 1995, Linden won his third Daytime Emmy Award for his 1994 guest-starring role as Rabbi Markovitz on CBS Schoolbreak Special.

In 1996, Linden had a supporting role in the television film The Colony, opposite John Ritter and June Lockhart. The role was a departure for Linden, as he played the villainous head of a home owner's association of a gated community. In 1999, he had a guest role in the last The Rockford Files reunion TV film, The Rockford Files: If It Bleeds... It Leads. In 1997, he played Ebeneezer Scrooge in the yearly Madison Square Garden production of A Christmas Carol. He continued his career in the late 1990s and 2000s with guest roles on Touched by an Angel, The King of Queens, Gilmore Girls, Law & Order: Criminal Intent, and Hot in Cleveland. In 2001, he played the lead in the Broadway production of The Gathering at the Cort Theater, in a role that had been played off-Broadway by Theodore Bikel. He also narrated episodes of Biography and The American Experience, and voiced Eli Selig, Zeta's creator, on the animated series The Zeta Project. In 2002, Linden received a Golden Palm Star on the Palm Springs, California, Walk of Stars.

In 2008, he played Arvide Abernathy in Guys and Dolls at Hilbert Circle Theatre. Linden continued to have an active stage career. He appeared in the Toronto production of Tuesdays with Morrie in 2009. In July 2011, he appeared opposite Christina Pickles in the Colony Theatre's production of On Golden Pond. In 2011, Linden starred in a touring production of Shine featuring local professional talent. Linden also starred in Under My Skin, which premiered at the Pasadena Playhouse on September 19, 2012, and ran through October 2012. In 2013, Linden guest-starred in a season eight episode of Supernatural as a rabbi and played the Interlocutor in the Ahmanson Theatre production of The Scottsboro Boys. In 2014, Linden guest-starred in an episode of the comedy series 2 Broke Girls. In 2015, he appeared at the Old Globe Theatre in the West Coast premiere of The Twenty Seventh Man starring as Yevgeny Zunser.. In 2023, Linden played an elderly relative of Jonah Hill’s character in the film You People, directed by Kenya Barris and starring Hill, Lauren London, Eddie Murphy, and Julia Louis-Dreyfus.

=== Music ===
After the success of Barney Miller, Linden decided to revive his music career with a nightclub act. In his act, Linden played the clarinet, performed pop and Broadway standards backed by a big band, and discussed his life and career. In March 2011, he began touring with the cabaret show An Evening with Hal Linden: I'm Old Fashioned. The show, which ran through 2012, was later released on DVD. In April 2011, Linden released his first album, It's Never Too Late. The album features a collection of jazz, Broadway and pop standards that Linden began recording around the time he was touring in the early 1980s. Due to a lack of interest, he shelved the songs. Linden decided to finish the album on the advice of his tour booker.

== Personal life ==
Linden is the spokesman for the Jewish National Fund, a position he has held since 1997.

Linden met dancer Fran Martin while doing summer stock in 1955. They married in 1958 and had four children. Martin died in 2010.

In 1984, Linden narrated a short film on former President Harry S. Truman, which was shown during that year's Democratic National Convention.

== Broadway credits ==
Date	Production	Role
November 29, 1956 – March 7, 1959	Bells Are Ringing	Jeff Moss (Replacement)
December 16, 1960 – June 3, 1961	Wildcat	Matt (Replacement)
May 8, 1962 - December 9, 1962	Anything Goes (Off-Broadway revival)	Billy Crocker
November 10 – 21, 1964	Something More!	Dick
October 17, 1965 – June 11, 1966	On a Clear Day You Can See Forever	Dr. Mark Bruckner, Edward Moncrief
April 11, 1967 – January 13, 1968	Illya Darling	No Face
April 4 – 27, 1968	The Education of H*Y*M*A*N K*A*P*L*A*N	Yissel Fishbein
October 16, 1969 – January 10, 1970	Three Men on a Horse	Charlie
October 19, 1970 – January 1, 1972	The Rothschilds	Mayer Rothschild
January 26 – 29, 1972	The Sign in Sidney Brustein's Window	Sidney Brustein
December 9, 1973 – February 3, 1974	The Pajama Game	Sid Sorokin
November 19, 1985 – January 17, 1988	I'm Not Rappaport	Nat (Replacement)
March 18, 1993 – July 16, 1994	The Sisters Rosensweig	Mervyn Kant (Replacement)
April 29 – August 2002	Cabaret	Herr Schultz (Replacement)
April 24 – May 13, 2001	The Gathering	Gabe

== Industrial musicals ==
Year	Production	Company
1963	Going Great!	Rambler Motors
1966	Diesel Dazzle	Detroit Diesel Corporation

== Filmography ==
Film
Year	Title	Role	Notes
1960	Bells Are Ringing	Singer of "The Midas Touch"	
1964	That Man from Rio	Voice role	English version Alternative title: L'Homme de Rio
1967	Godzilla vs. the Sea Monster	Yoshimura (Akira Takarada)	Voice, English version
1968	Destroy All Monsters	Captain Katsuo Yamabe (Akira Kubo)	Voice, English version
1979	When You Comin' Back, Red Ryder?	Richard Ethridge	
1980	Deathquake	Narrator	English version
1988	A New Life	Mel Arons	
1996	Just Friends	Mr. Barton	
1997	The Others	Principal Richard Meltzer	
1997	Out to Sea	Mac Valor	
1999	Jump	Shrink	
2001	Dumb Luck	Blaine Mitchell	
2002	Time Changer	The Dean	
2005	Freezerburn	Roderick Carr the Cult Leader	
2008	Light Years Away	Grandpa Sommers	
2016	Stevie D	Max Levine	
2018	The Samuel Project	Samuel	
2019	Grand-Daddy Day Care	Gabe	
2023	You People	Mr. Greenwald	
2024	Micro Budget	Russel	

Television
Year	Title	Role	Notes
1957	Producers' Showcase		Episode: "Ruggles of Red Gap"
1963	Car 54, Where Are You?	Assistant DA Clark	Episode: "Joan Crawford Didn't Say No"
1969	Search for Tomorrow	Larry Carter	Unknown episodes
1970	Hastings Corner	District Attorney Corey Honker/Morey Honker	Television film
1972	Circle of Fear	David Wells	Segment: "Elegy for a Vampire"
1973	Mr. Inside/Mr. Outside	Det. Lou Isaacs	Television film
1973	The F.B.I	Abel Norton	"The Confession"
1975–1982	Barney Miller	Capt. Barney Miller	170 episodes
1976	The Love Boat	Andrew Canaan	Television film
1976	How to Break Up a Happy Divorce	Tony Bartlett	Television film
1978	Dorothy Hamill Presents Winners		Variety special
1980	Father Figure	Howard	Television film
1981	The Muppet Show	Himself	Season 5, Episode 17
1982	I Do! I Do!	He (Michael)	Television film
1983	Starflight: The Plane That Couldn't Land	Josh Gilliam	Television film
1983	The Other Woman	Lou Chadway	Television film
1984	Second Edition	Cliff Penrose	Television film
1985	My Wicked, Wicked Ways: The Legend of Errol Flynn	Jack L. Warner	Television film
1986	Blacke's Magic	Alexander Blacke	13 episodes
1987	The Grand Knockout Tournament	Himself	Television special; provided commentary for American telecast
1989	Dream Breakers	Harry Palliser	Television film
1990	The Ray Bradbury Theater	Captain Black	Episode: "Mars Is Heaven"
1991	The Golden Girls	John Neretti	Episode: "What a Difference a Date Makes"
1992–1993	Jack's Place	Jack Evans	18 episodes
1994	American Experience	Narrator	Episode: "America and the Holocaust: Deceit and Indifference"
1994	CBS Schoolbreak Special	Rabbi Markovitz	Episode: "The Writing On the Wall"
1994–1995	The Boys Are Back	Fred Hansen	18 episodes
1995	The Colony	Philip Denig	Television film
1996	Nowhere Man	Senator Wallace	Episode: "Gemini"
1996–2001	Touched by an Angel	Various roles	Two episodes
1998	Biography	Narrator	Episode: "Confucius: Words of Wisdom"
1998	Killers in the House	Arthur Pendleton	Television film
1999	The Nanny	Maury Sherry	Episode: "California, Here We Come"
1999	The Rockford Files: If It Bleeds... It Leads	Ernie Landale	Television film
1999	The Drew Carey Show	Mr. Van Zandt	Episode: "Brotherhood of Man"
2000	Rude Awakening	Judge Howard Barrett	Episode: "Judging Billie"
2001	Lloyd in Space	Old Lloyd Nebulon (voice)	Episode: "Halloween Scary Fun Action Plan"
2002	Gilmore Girls	Chad	Episode: "There's the Rub"
2002	The Zeta Project	Dr. Eli Selig (voice)	Episode: "The Hologram Man"
2002	The Glow	Arnold Janusz	Television film
2003	Law & Order: Criminal Intent	Mr. Turner	Episode: "Suite Sorrow"
2004	Will & Grace	Alan	Episode: "A Gay/December Romance"
2005	Huff	Judge Bork	Episode: "The Sample Closet"
2005	The King of Queens	Bernard	Episode: "Catching Hell"
2006	Living with Fran	Hal	Episode: "The Whole Clan with Fran"
2006–2007	The Bold and the Beautiful	Jerry Kramer	Six episodes
2008	A Kiss at Midnight	Arthur Wright	Television film
2010	In Security		Television film
2010	Hot in Cleveland	Alex	Episode: "Meet the Parents"
2011	Outside the Box	Father Merrin	Unknown episodes
2012	NTSF:SD:SUV::	C.T. Dalton	Episode: "Prairie Dog Companion"
2013	The Mindy Project	Manny	Episode: "Mindy's Brother"
2013	Supernatural	Rabbi Isaac Bass	Episode: "Everybody Hates Hitler"
2014	2 Broke Girls	Lester	Episode: "And the New Lease on Life"
2016	Royal Pains	Dr. Joe Whitcomb	Episode: "Saab Story"
2016	American Housewife	MR. Montez	Episode: "Krampus Katie"
2018	Law & Order: Special Victims Unit	Leonard Maxwell	Episode: "Mama"
2019	Grey's Anatomy	Bird	Episode: "Reunited"
2024	Hacks	Biff Cliff	Episode: "Bulletproof"

== Awards ==
Year	Award	Category	Title of work
1971	Tony Award	Best Actor in a Musical	The Rothschilds
1983	Daytime Emmy Award	Special Classification of Outstanding Individual Achievement - Performers	FYI
1984	Daytime Emmy Award	Special Classification of Outstanding Individual Achievement - Performers	FYI
1995	Daytime Emmy Award	Outstanding Performer in a Children's Special	CBS Schoolbreak Special
