= Timberly Whitfield =

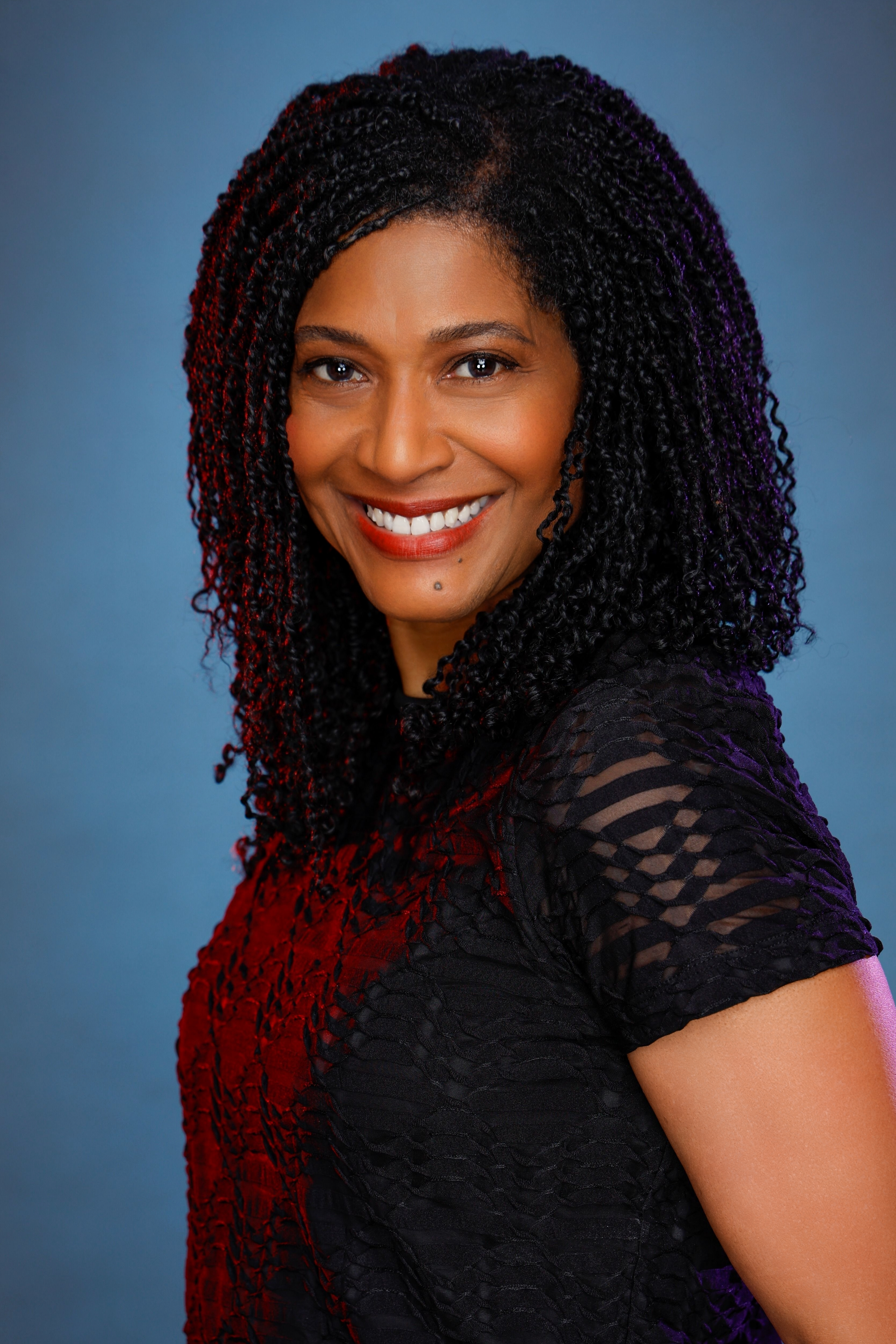
- Born: Kansas City, Missouri
- Occupation: Talk show host
- Website: Timberly Whitfield official site

Timberly Noe Whitfield is an American talk show host.

== Biography ==
=== Early life ===
Born in Kansas City, Missouri, U.S., her United Methodist Church lay missionary parents (who were also civil rights activists and Black Panthers) moved Whitfield and her brother to Tanzania, East Africa, when she was six. As a Swahili-speaking eight-year-old, Whitfield taught English to local Tanzanian children. The family later lived in Nigeria, West Africa.

=== Career ===
Whitfield began hosting the award-winning, magazine-style television series New Morning with Timberly Whitfield in 2002. The show ran for six seasons on Hallmark Channel. On December 28, 2007, the show concluded its six-season run with its 541st episode. After that, Whitfield transitioned to the Internet where, at FaithStreams.com, she regularly posted her “Video Reflections.” She currently appears live on network affiliates around the country as a parenting expert and spokesperson for PLUS Media, a national marketing firm.

Whitfield appeared as a correspondent on Naomi’s New Morning, a talk show hosted by Naomi Judd, which was broadcast by Hallmark Channel from 2005 to 2007.

Whitfield graduated with a master's degree from Columbia University Graduate School of Journalism, where she was honored with the John M. Patterson Award. Whitfield quickly rose in the industry. Her early credits (on both sides of the camera) include co-hosting The History Channel’s Field Trips USA and Year by Year for Kids, and interviewing celebrities (ranging from Oprah Winfrey and Gwyneth Paltrow to classical performing artists) for A&E Television Networks’ Breakfast with the Arts . For over seven years she served as programming executive and producer for several series on A&E.

=== Personal life ===
Whitfield is married to Robert Allen, a former lieutenant in the New York City Police Department.

Whitfield has been a vegetarian since she was nine years old.

In late 2007 she delivered a speech at the Green Festival in Washington, D.C. about the many different ways in which mainstream media have gone green.

=== Education ===
- Columbia University, New York City, New York, U.S., M.S. Journalism.
- Clark Atlanta University, Atlanta, Georgia, U.S., B.A. Mass Communications/Religion & Philosophy.
- Schiller International University, Heidelberg, Germany, Exchange Student.

== Television and other media ==
- All Together Now, ABC News Now, hosted by Father Edward L. Beck, March 7, 2008: "Part One". ABC News. and "Part Two". ABC News.
- DarynKagan.com, “New Morning with Timberly Whitfield,” October 12, 2007.
- Meet The Faith, Black Entertainment Television , “Black & Green,” hosted by Dr. Ian Smith, Fall 2007.

== Press ==
- Savedge, Jenn. The Green Parent: A Kid-Friendly Guide to Environmentally-Friendly Living (interview), April 2008.
- Eversley, Melanie. “"Who Does She Think She Is? She's Timberly Whitfield, Journalist and Woman of the World".” Sister 2 Sister Magazine, March 2008.
- Weeks, Alexia. "There’s So Much Good Happening in the World,” Lifescape Magazine, December 2007.
- Paschal, Jan. “Her Destiny: Upbeat News,” Columbia University Graduate School of Journalism Alumni Journal, Winter 2007.
- Bar Geffen, Linoy. “The Next Oprah,” Yedioth Acharonoth (Israeli newspaper), July 8, 2007.
- Holloway, Lynette R. “Fitness at Any Age,” Ebony Magazine, July 2007.
- Waldron, Clarence. "Timberly Whitfield: Host of Daily Show ‘New Morning’ on Hallmark Channel,” Jet Magazine, June 25, 2007.
- Ritchie, Kathy. "Faith, Race & Family,” Child Magazine, June/July 2007.
- Goldstein, Alison. “"In Her Family's Footsteps: Broadcaster Draws Inspiration from Tradition". Archived from the original on 2011-08-07. B’nai B’rith Magazine, Summer 2007.
- Chapman-Mushnick, Melissa. “Defying Boundaries,” Lifestyles Magazine, Summer 2007.

== Articles by Timberly Whitfield ==
- “"5 Things I Learned from Growing Up in Africa . . ".” Positive Thinking Magazine, January/February 2008.
- “"Strange Reality". Spirituality & Health, March/April 2007.
