= Equitrekking =

Equitrekking is the Emmy award-winning equestrian themed travel television show on public television. Myrtle Beach, South Carolina native Darley Newman, the show's host, writer and producer, and a 2001 graduate of George Washington University, takes viewers to locations around the world for horseback riding and other adventure activities with local people. The show features tourist-friendly ranches, trail rides, horse breeds, and equestrian events, as well as a variety of locations in the United States and abroad. The series visits off the beaten path destinations with local people to give viewers a greater sense of the history and culture of each locale.

== History and development ==
Equitrekking first aired a pilot episode filmed in Ireland in July 2004 on Horse TV. The series then filmed a New Mexico episode which broadcast on KNME-TV in New Mexico. "Equitrekking" then began national broadcasts on Public Television through American Public Television.

The 33-episode series now airs on Public Broadcasting Service stations across the country and on international networks. "Equitrekking" is also broadcast on CREATE TV, a Public Television lifestyle network. Equitrekking's companion book "Equitrekking Travel Adventures on Horseback," published by Chronicle Books and written by Darley Newman with photographs from Equitrekking's Executive Producer Chip Ward, who is also her husband, features dozens of scenic rides in the U.S. and around the globe from "Equitrekking's" first 13 episodes. Hundreds of photographs paired with Darley Newman's travelogue bring to life a mix of landscape, history, culture, and horses.

Equitrekking is the first television series to explore the world on horseback and each episode is filmed in high-definition television (HDTV). "Equitrekking" Won First Prize for Best Travel Broadcast in 2008 and 2009 and the "Equitrekking Travel Adventures on Horseback" book won the Merit Award for Best Travel Book in the 2008 North American Travel Journalist Association Competition. In May 2009, Equitrekking was nominated for two Daytime Emmys for Outstanding Special Class Series and Outstanding Single Camera Photography.

In August 2009, Equitrekking won a Daytime Emmy for Outstanding Single Camera Photography. In May 2010, Equitrekking was nominated for a Daytime Emmy for Outstanding Special Class Series. In May 2011, "Equitrekking" was nominated for a Daytime Emmy for Outstanding Special Class Writing.

"Equitrekking" has a companion website at Equitrekking.com that features travel video clips, travel articles and travel tips related to horse riding and adventure travel, Darley’s blog, photos and a monthly e-newsletter. The Equitrekking Vacation Guide, which has been featured in the Chicago Tribune, showcases great horse riding vacation destinations including dude and guest ranches, horse safaris, pack trips, cattle drives, equestrian resorts and horse holiday destinations around the world. EquitrekkingTravel.com launched in January 2010 and features global equestrian vacations inspired by the Equitrekking TV series.

== Episodes ==
Episodes take viewers to Virginia Hunt Country, Ireland, Hawaii, Iceland, California Wine Country, North Carolina, South Carolina, Wyoming, Georgia Coast, Vermont, Colorado, Spain, Belize, Costa Rica, Kentucky, Quebec, Arizona, Utah, Quebec City, Scotland, Wales, Alaska, Turkey, Alberta, Canada, Jordan, and Uruguay. The series has two specials on Great National Parks and Great American Ranches.

== Accolades ==
=== Emmy Awards and nominations ===
| Year | Association | Nominated work | Result |
|---|---|---|---|
| 2009 | Daytime Emmy Award for Outstanding Single Camera Photography | Greg Barna for Equitrekking | Won |
| 2009 | Daytime Emmy Award for Outstanding Special Class Series | Darley Newman & Chip Ward for Equitrekking | Nominated |
| 2010 | Daytime Emmy Award for Outstanding Special Class Series | Darley Newman & Chip Ward for Equitrekking | Nominated |
| 2011 | Daytime Emmy Award for Outstanding Special Class Writing | Darley Newman & Chip Ward Equitrekking | Nominated |
| 2012 | Daytime Emmy Award for Outstanding Single Camera Photography | Greg Barna for Equitrekking | Won |
| 2013 | Daytime Emmy Award for Outstanding Single Camera Photography | Greg Barna for Equitrekking | Won |
| 2013 | Daytime Emmy Award for Outstanding Travel and Adventure Program | Darley Newman & Chip Ward for Equitrekking | Nominated |
| 2013 | Daytime Emmy Award for Outstanding Special Class Writing | Darley Newman & Chip Ward for Equitrekking | Nominated |

=== Other honors ===
- 2008: North American Travel Journalists Association (NATJA) First Place Award for Best Travel Broadcast (Video) for Equitrekking
- 2008: North American Travel Journalists Association (NATJA) Award of Merit for Best Travel Book for Equitrekking: Travel Adventures on Horseback
- 2009: North American Travel Journalists Association (NATJA) First Place Award for Best Travel Broadcast (Video) for Equitrekking
- 2012: Silver Telly Winner for The Telly Awards' Film/Video TV Programs, Segments, or Promotional Pieces - Videography/Cinematography for DCN Creative's Equitrekking
- 2012: Bronze Telly Winner for The Telly Awards' Film/Video TV Programs, Segments, or Promotional Pieces - Travel/Tourism for DCN Creative's Equitrekking
