= The Thomas Jefferson Hour =

Radio program & podcast

- Genre: Educational
- Running time: 60 minutes
- Country of origin: United States
- Language: English
- Syndicates: Prairie Public Radio
- Hosted by: David Swenson
- Starring: Clay Jenkinson
- Created by: Clay Jenkinson
- Recording studio: Makoché Recording Studios; Bismarck, North Dakota
- Original release: 1994 – 2023
- No. of episodes: 1548 (Note: This count reflects the current episode number. In episode #987, however, Swenson explains that a numbering discontinuity was introduced when the program moved to North Dakota.)
- Website: jeffersonhour.com
- Podcast: jeffersonhour.libsyn.com/rss

The Thomas Jefferson Hour was a syndicated public radio program and podcast produced in Bismarck, North Dakota. It featured author-historian Clay S. Jenkinson in a first-person portrayal of Thomas Jefferson, the third US President, and was co-hosted by David Swenson. Jenkinson remained in-character as Jefferson throughout the first half of the program, delivering monologues and answering listener questions regarding Jefferson's personal and political life and the history of early America. The character of Jefferson generally confined his discussion to matters of history, politics, and philosophy as indirect context for modern times, but at times provided a limited analysis of current events (carefully attempting to limit his analysis to matters on which the actual Jefferson's view might be meaningfully determined). In the second portion of the program, Jenkinson stepped out of character to discuss his in-character answers during the first half of the show and also to talk generally about the topic of the episode.

== History ==
The Jefferson Hour began production in Reno, Nevada in the 1990s. For 12 years, Jenkinson collaborated with co-host Bill Chrystal (not to be confused with commentator Bill Kristol), a Congregational pastor and fellow historical interpreter. Chrystal was not the original co-host of the program, however. Jenkinson moved back to North Dakota in 2005, and introduced himself at Swenson's Makoché Recording Studios. Swenson agreed to co-host the program for a few transitional weeks, but was ultimately the "semi-permanent guest host" for 21 years. The Thomas Jefferson Hour was superseded by Listening to America with Clay Jenkinson in May 2023.
