= The ABC Afternoon Playbreak =

- Genre: Anthology
- Country of origin: United States
- Original language: English
- No. of seasons: 2
- No. of episodes: 9

Production
- Running time: 90 mins.

Original release
- Network: ABC
- Release: October 31, 1973 – February 13, 1975

The ABC Afternoon Playbreak is an American television anthology series that was broadcast on ABC from 1973 to 1975. The ninety-minute dramas aired once a month and featured some of the more popular television and film stars of the 1970s (Diana Hyland, Bradford Dillman, Patty Duke, Diane Baker, David Hedison).

== Episodes ==
Season 1

1. "A Gift Of Terror" (April 5, 1973)
2. "The Things I Never Said" (October 31, 1973)
3. "A Special Act of Love" (November 14, 1973)
4. "Mother of the Bride" (January 9, 1974)
5. "Miss Kline, We Love You" (February 27, 1974)
6. "Last Bride of Salem" (May 8, 1974)

Season 2

1. "Can I Save My Children?" (October 17, 1974)
2. "Heart in Hiding" (November 14, 1974)
3. "Oh, Baby, Baby, Baby..." (December 5, 1974)
4. "The Girl Who Couldn't Lose" (February 13, 1975)

== ABC's Matinee Today ==
The series was preempted in December 1973 for the pilot of ABC's Matinee Today, another dramatic anthology series. The pilot ran daily for five days, but never returned to the ABC schedule. The five episodes are frequently listed as part of The ABC Afternoon Playbreak.

1. "I Never Said Goodbye" (December 3, 1973)
2. "The Other Woman" (December 4, 1973)
3. "Alone with Terror" (December 5, 1973)
4. "My Secret Mother" (December 6, 1973)
5. "The Mask of Love" (December 7, 1973)

== Awards ==
The 14 episodes of these two related anthologies won 18 Daytime Emmy Awards and were nominated an additional 16 times.

Episode	Award Season	Award(s)
"A Special Act of Love"	1973-1974	Richard Clements, Outstanding Music Direction
"The Other Woman"	1973-1974	Outstanding Drama Special; Pat O'Brien, Outstanding Actor in Daytime Drama (Special); Pat O'Brien, Daytime Actor of the Year
"The Mask of Love"	1973-1974	Cathleen Nesbitt, Outstanding Actress in Daytime Drama (Special); Cathleen Nesbitt, Daytime Actress of the Year; Bill Jobe, Outstanding Costume Design; Douglas D. Kelly, Outstanding Makeup
"Miss Kline, We Love You"	1973-1974	H. Wesley Kenney, Outstanding Directing in a Special Program; H. Wesley Kenney, Daytime Director of the Year; Outstanding Editing
"Mother of the Bride"	1973-1974	Lila Garrett, Sandy Krinski, Outstanding Writing in a Special; Lila Garrett, Sandy Krinski, Daytime Writer of the Year
"The Girl Who Couldn't Lose"	1974-1975	Outstanding Drama Special; Mort Lachman, Outstanding Directing in a Special
"The Last Bride of Salem"	1974-1975	Bradford Dillman, Outstanding Actor in a Drama Special
"Heart in Hiding"	1974-1975	Kay Lenz, Outstanding Actress in a Drama Special; Audrey Davis Levin, Outstanding Writing in a Special
