= Breakfast with the Arts =

- Genre: Arts, music
- Country of origin: United States
- Original language: English

Production
- Executive producers: Emilio Nunez, John T. Bence (Senior Producer 1991-2004)
- Producers: Liisa Lunden, Kevin Koltz, Scott Kerbey, Nic Harcourt, Kathleen Murtha, Robert Urband, Haewon Yom, Taimi Strehlow, Gregory Dagostino, Laura Marini, Janel Bladow
- Production location: New York
- Cinematography: Srael Boruchin, Ed Staebler
- Editors: Rob Mott, James Kelly, Nico Agostino, Josh Cramer
- Running time: 60-120 minutes

Original release
- Network: A&E
- Release: 1991 – June 24, 2007

Related
- Private Sessions

Breakfast with the Arts is a television program that aired on A&E (Arts & Entertainment) from 1991 until 2007.

== Overview ==
In its first decade the program focused on classical music, dance, opera, jazz, the visual arts, theater, and film. American television audiences first heard live performances and interviews with Juan Diego Florez, Deborah Voigt, Richard Bona, Michel Camillo, Janet McTeer, Pierre Laurent Aimard, and Susan Graham on Breakfast with the Arts. Other notable guests included Catherine Deneuve, Kenneth Branagh, Michael Caine, Vanessa Redgrave, Kirk Douglas, Yoko Ono, Plácido Domingo, Daniel Barenboim, Michael Tilson Thomas, Jeremy Irons, Kate Mulgrew, Audra McDonald, Uta Hagen, Arturo Sandoval, Dave Brubeck, Terence Blanchard, Ron Howard, and Robert Altman.

Later the programming was broadened to include rock music. Guests included country musician Bonnie Raitt, rock band Los Lobos, pop artist Avril Lavigne, actress Lauren Bacall, and pop singer Natasha Bedingfield. The host for the first 12 years was Peabody Award winning broadcaster Elliott Forrest; later episodes were hosted by Karina Huber.

TV personality Timberly Whitfield also served as a correspondent and interviewed celebrities for the program.

In 2003 and in 2005, the series was nominated for several Daytime Emmy Award. After the cancellation of the series in summer 2007, A&E debuted a new Sunday morning arts program titled Private Sessions, formatted similarly to Breakfast and hosted by Lynn Hoffman, with executive producers Thomas Moody and Nicholas Van Hoogstraten, senior producer Liisa Lunden and series producer Scott Kerbey.
