= Split Ends (American TV series) =

- Country of origin: United States
- No. of seasons: 5
- No. of episodes: 46

Production
- Executive producers: Rasha Drachkovitch; Sarah Weidman; Glen Meehan; Stephanie Drachkovitch

Original release
- Network: Style Network
- Release: November 17, 2006 – October 10, 2009

Split Ends is an American reality television series on the Style Network that debuted on November 17, 2006 and ran for five seasons. The series follows high-end salon workers who swap jobs with small-town hair stylists for three days. Each stylist must see if they can keep the clients happy and be able to adjust to each other's environment.

== Series overview ==
| Season | Episodes | Originally released | |
| Season | Episodes | First released | Last released |
|---|---|---|---|
| 1 | 9 | November 17, 2006 | January 13, 2007 |
| 2 | 8 | June 23, 2007 | August 11, 2007 |
| 3 | 9 | April 5, 2008 | June 7, 2008 |
| 4 | 10 | November 22, 2008 | January 24, 2009 |
| 5 | 10 | August 8, 2009 | October 10, 2009 |

== Episodes ==
=== Season 1 (2006–2007) ===
| No. overall | No. in season | Title | Original release date |
|---|---|---|---|
| 1 | 1 | "Peter Ishkans & Susan Clark" | November 17, 2006 |
| 2 | 2 | "Vinnie Tunnero & Jody Jack" | November 25, 2006 |
| 3 | 3 | "Allen Edwards & Liz Savage" | December 2, 2006 |
| 4 | 4 | "Christina May & Tony Rossi" | December 9, 2006 |
| 5 | 5 | "Aslana Schilf & Robert Garcia" | December 16, 2006 |
| 6 | 6 | "Michelle Jones Smith & Amber Carter" | December 16, 2006 |
| 7 | 7 | "Brandon Martinez & Yasmin Giles" | December 30, 2006 |
| 8 | 8 | "Rebecca Goodson & Charise Braunwalde" | January 6, 2007 |
| 9 | 9 | "Peter Ishkhans and Tracy Whitenack" | January 13, 2007 |

=== Season 2 (2007) ===
| No. overall | No. in season | Title | Original release date |
|---|---|---|---|
| 10 | 1 | "Tami Jensen & Heather Mills" | June 23, 2007 |
| 11 | 2 | "Evie Pearson & Andrea Skidmore" | June 30, 2007 |
| 12 | 3 | "Marcia Hamilton & Sneice Bassett" | July 7, 2007 |
| 13 | 4 | "Steven Noss & Melanie Shelley" | July 14, 2007 |
| 14 | 5 | "Venita Saluto & Paul Parkey" | July 22, 2007 |
| 15 | 6 | "John Barrett & Lynn Mikels" | July 28, 2007 |
| 16 | 7 | "John Bickford & Symantha Lawrence" | August 4, 2007 |
| 17 | 8 | "Joe Hamer & Scott Adams" | August 11, 2007 |

=== Season 3 (2008) ===
| No. overall | No. in season | Title | Original release date |
|---|---|---|---|
| 18 | 1 | "Susan Summers & Mary Lamb" | April 5, 2008 |
| 19 | 2 | "Hasblady Guzman & Dayna Gamba" | April 13, 2008 |
| 20 | 3 | "Gina Chiccanello & Danielle Kreske" | April 19, 2008 |
| 21 | 4 | "Gina Forestieri & Alexander Hernandez" | April 26, 2008 |
| 22 | 5 | "Krisanna Conrad & Shauna Raisch" | May 10, 2008 |
| 23 | 6 | "Tara Nalty & Enrique Cruz" | May 17, 2008 |
| 24 | 7 | "Dontez Love and Chris Do" | May 24, 2008 |
| 25 | 8 | "Arsenio Amadis & Julia Papworth" | May 31, 2008 |
| 26 | 9 | "Terre Steed & DJ Dermott" | June 7, 2008 |

=== Season 4 (2008–2009) ===
| No. overall | No. in season | Title | Original release date |
|---|---|---|---|
| 27 | 1 | "Christian Rea & Candace Mulllins" | November 22, 2008 |
| 28 | 2 | "JP Shaffer & Tracie Kennedy" | November 29, 2008 |
| 29 | 3 | "Rachael Epstein and April Petty" | December 6, 2008 |
| 30 | 4 | "David Lujan and Caitlin Richardson" | December 13, 2008 |
| 31 | 5 | "Amy Bland and Jake Desrouchers" | December 20, 2008 |
| 32 | 6 | "Estrella Elliott and Lauren Viccellio" | December 27, 2008 |
| 33 | 7 | "Leslie Howard and Lee Stafford" | January 3, 2009 |
| 34 | 8 | "Tricia Delgado and Kookie Maffett" | January 10, 2009 |
| 35 | 9 | "Richard Glass and Amanda Mock" | January 17, 2009 |
| 36 | 10 | "Lewis Powell and Clark Russell" | January 24, 2009 |

=== Season 5 (2009) ===
| No. overall | No. in season | Title | Original release date |
|---|---|---|---|
| 37 | 1 | "Shi Salon, St. Louis, MO; Elgin Charles, Beverly Hills, CA" | August 8, 2009 |
| 38 | 2 | "Keleigh Laier; Kamryn Weis" | August 15, 2009 |
| 39 | 3 | "Samantha Skudlarek; Alireza "Denis" Chetzan" | August 22, 2009 |
| 40 | 4 | "Martin Ormaza & Seth Bogard" | August 22, 2009 |
| 41 | 5 | "Bo Stegall & Ozell Graham" | September 5, 2009 |
| 42 | 6 | "Adi Simadi & Anthony Pazos" | September 12, 2009 |
| 43 | 7 | "Kim "Tweet" Jones; Lensi White" | September 19, 2009 |
| 44 | 8 | "Sammy Mar; Stacy Padden" | September 26, 2009 |
| 45 | 9 | "Monica Boccella; Tamika Bonner" | October 3, 2009 |
| 46 | 10 | "The Big Cut Off" | October 10, 2009 |
