= Private Sessions =

Private Sessions is a 2007 television series produced by the A&E Network featuring top entertainers interviewed by host Lynn Hoffman. Most guests are musicians that perform several of their songs during the hour-long episode, but actors also have appeared on the show.

The show premiered July 22, 2007 on A&E, succeeding Breakfast with the Arts. The debut program featured Avril Lavigne, and has featured musical guests Bon Jovi, Barenaked Ladies, Blues Traveler, Counting Crows, Duran Duran, En Vogue, The Goo Goo Dolls, Ann and Nancy Wilson (interviewed) of Heart (performed), Boyz II Men, Backstreet Boys, James Blunt, Maroon 5, Meat Loaf, Queen Latifah, Ringo Starr, Seal, Chicago, and Toby Keith, as well as actors John Cusack, Michael Douglas, and Anthony Hopkins. Additional guests include Annie Lennox, Journey, Sting, Mary J. Blige, Brooks & Dunn, Cyndi Lauper, Carly Simon, Lionel Richie and Dustin Hoffman. Series taped in the A&E studio, however many episodes were shot on location. Executive Producers: Thomas Moody and Nicholas Van Hoogstraten. Senior Producer: Liisa Lunden. Series Producer: Scott Kerbey. Line Producer: James Tomlinson.
