= Clay S. Jenkinson =

American historian

Clay Straus Jenkinson
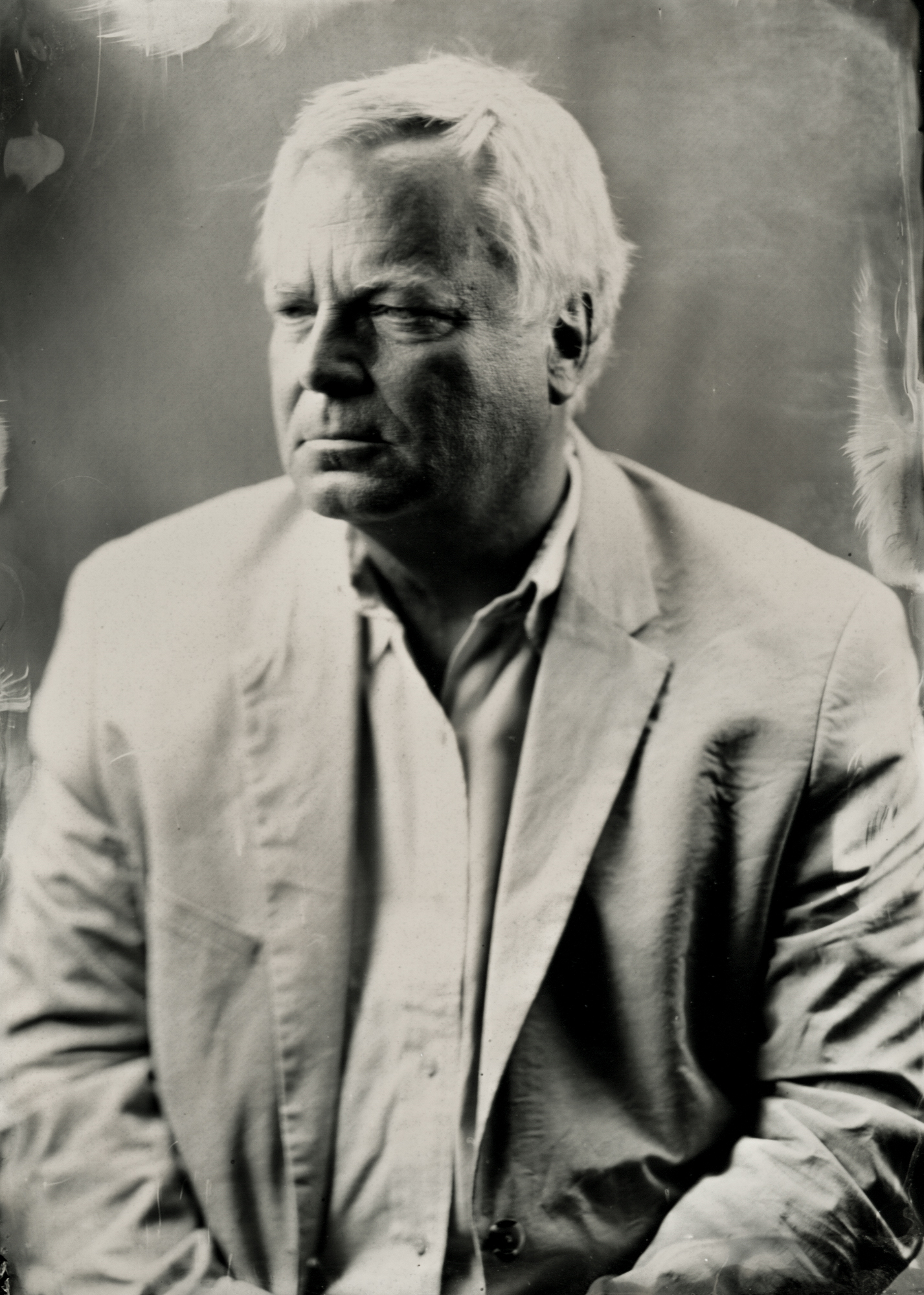
- Clay Jenkinson Wet Plate Collodion
- Born: February 4, 1955; Dickinson, North Dakota, U.S.

Clay Straus Jenkinson (born February 4, 1955, in Dickinson, North Dakota) is an American humanities scholar, author and educator. He is currently the director of The Dakota Institute, where he co-hosts public radio's Listening to America, formerly The Thomas Jefferson Hour, and creates documentary films, symposia, and literary projects. He lectures at Dickinson State University and Bismarck State College.

== Life ==
Jenkinson was born in Dickinson, in southwestern North Dakota; his father was a banker and his mother a schoolteacher. Although the family moved quite often when he and his sister were children, Jenkinson grew up mostly in Dickinson. He graduated from Dickinson High School in 1973 and then attended Vanderbilt University and the University of Minnesota. He graduated in 1977 with a degree in English, and was then a Rhodes scholar at Oxford.

In 2005 at the age of 50 Jenkinson returned to North Dakota as a permanent resident; he resides in Bismarck. He is currently the Director of The Dakota Institute through The Lewis & Clark Fort Mandan Foundation, Chief Consultant to The Theodore Roosevelt Center through Dickinson State University, and a Distinguished Humanities Scholar at Bismarck State College. He is James Marsh Professor-at-Large at the University of Vermont.

Jenkinson has one child, Catherine Missouri Walker Jenkinson, from his marriage to Etta L. Walker (they married on 16 March 1986 and divorced in 1997). His daughter was named after the Little Missouri River.

Jenkinson has appeared in a number of Ken Burns' documentaries, including Thomas Jefferson, The Roosevelts and in Burns’ 2023 documentary The American Buffalo.

== Portrayal of Jefferson ==
Jenkinson first achieved fame for his portrayal (first-person historical interpretation) of Thomas Jefferson. On April 11, 1994, he was the first public humanities scholar to present a program at a White House-sponsored event when he presented Thomas Jefferson for a gathering hosted by President and Mrs. Clinton. As co-founder of the modern Chautauqua movement, Jenkinson has also portrayed Sir Francis Bacon, Jonathan Swift, J. Robert Oppenheimer, John Wesley Powell, Jean-Jacques Rousseau, Theodore Roosevelt, and Meriwether Lewis.

Jenkinson's public portrayals take the form of lengthy monologues followed by Q & A sessions as the character (in costume) featured for that performance. At the end of his performances, he steps out of character and answers questions as himself. Another performance variation is represented by his nationally syndicated radio show, The Thomas Jefferson Hour:

"While staying resolutely in character, Mr. Jenkinson permits Jefferson to answer audience questions on a broad range of historical subjects and comment carefully on contemporary social and political topics."

On November 15, 2006, Clay appeared as Jefferson on The Colbert Report with two other Jefferson impersonators, Bill Barker and Steven Edenbo.

== Awards ==
In 1989, Jenkinson became one of the first winners of the nation's highest award in the humanities, the Charles Frankel Prize, awarded by President George H.W. Bush for his achievements. The National Endowment for the Humanities once described Jenkinson as "A leader in the revival of Chautauqua, a forum for public discussion about the ideas and lives of key figures in American history." He has been awarded the Robert J. Laxalt Writer of the Year Award from University of Nevada-Reno and is a Rhodes scholar and Danforth Scholar. Jenkinson was a senior fellow for the Center for Digital Government, based in California, and was scholar-in-residence at Lewis & Clark College in Portland, Oregon from 2002 to 2006, and Roosevelt scholar-in-residence at Dickinson State University from 2005 to 2008. In 2004, Jenkinson was inducted into the Scandinavian-American Hall of Fame, a signature event of Norsk Høstfest.

== Selected publications ==
=== Books and articles ===
- "The Bill Of Rights And Beyond: Thomas Jefferson's Perspective" (1996) ISSN 0887-6851
- Message on the Wind: A Spiritual Odyssey on the Northern Plains (2002)
- A Vast and Open Plain: The Writings of the Lewis and Clark Expedition in North Dakota, 1804-1806 (2003) ISBN 9781891419263
- Becoming Jefferson's People: Re-Inventing the American Republic in the Twenty-First Century (2004)
- Lewis and Clark in Iowa (2004) ISBN 9780975375105
- Theodore Roosevelt in the Dakota Badlands: An Historical Guide (2008) ISBN 9780978626709
- The Character of Meriwether Lewis: Explorer in the Wilderness (2011)
- A Free and Hardy Life: Theodore Roosevelt's Sojourn in the American West (2011) ISBN 9780982559789
- For the Love of North Dakota and Other Essays: Sundays with Clay in the Bismarck Tribune (2012) ISBN 9780983405917
- The Language of Cottonwoods: Essays on the Future of North Dakota (2021) ISBN 9781646631001

=== Documentaries ===
- When the Landscape is Quiet again: the Legacy of Art Link
