= Fight Back! with David Horowitz =

American reality television series

- Also known as: California Buyline (1976–1977); Consumer Buyline (1977–1980)
- Genre: Consumer information
- Created by: David Horowitz
- Directed by: Glen Swanson
- Presented by: David Horowitz
- Opening theme: "Fight Back! Theme", sung by Steve Donn (1985–1992)
- Ending theme: "Fight Back! Theme", sung by Steve Donn (1985–1992)
- Country of origin: United States
- Original language: English
- No. of seasons: 16
- No. of episodes: 582 (including California/Consumer Buyline)

Production
- Executive producer: David Horowitz
- Producers: Lloyd Thaxton; Merrill M. Mazuer (Season 1)
- Production location: Los Angeles, California
- Editors: Steve Purcell; Rich Thorne
- Camera setup: Bob Betzner
- Running time: 30 minutes
- Production companies: Consuming Media, LTD.

Original release
- Network: First-run syndication
- Release: September 20, 1976 – 1980
- Release: February 11, 1980 – 1992

Related
- Consumer Buyline; Money Tonight (special news segments aired from 1994 to 1995)

Fight Back! with David Horowitz was a weekly consumer advocate television show that ran from 1976 to 1992. The show, hosted by David Horowitz, informed consumers about corporations and other big businesses whose products were of poor quality. The format of the show allowed for some humorous segments, such as allowing people to send in photos of unintentionally funny signs. In 1987, the show was awarded best public affairs series for a network station and Horowitz also received a regional Emmy for host/moderator.

== History ==
Fight Back! originated as a weekly program on KNBC in Los Angeles called California Buyline, which premiered in September 1976, and was retitled Consumer Buyline for its second season. The program was created and hosted by KNBC consumer advocacy reporter and editor David Horowitz. After achieving high ratings locally during its first season, Consumer Buyline entered limited national syndication in January 1978, and began appearing on the other NBC owned-and-operated stations–at the time located in New York, Washington, D.C., Cleveland, and Chicago.

In January 1980 Westinghouse Broadcasting's Group W Productions unit purchased the production and syndication rights to Consumer Buyline, and in February 1980, the pilot episode of Fight Back! With David Horowitz was broadcast. As explained in a news article, Fight Back! was the same show as Consumer Buyline, but with a "larger budget." The pilot episode featured a segment shot in North Carolina, as well as a commercial challenge of a Volkswagen Rabbit. Fight Back! formally replaced Consumer Buyline in September 1980.

After the television show wrapped, David Horowitz continued work under the Fight Back! banner. Since 2013 the Fight Back! brand has been owned and operated by David Horowitz's daughter Amanda Horowitz, who has continued the work after her father's 2019 death.
