= FYI (1980 TV series) =

- Genre: information
- Presented by: Hal Linden
- Country of origin: United States
- Original language: English

Production
- Running time: 60 seconds

Original release
- Network: ABC
- Release: January 14, 1980 – December 30, 1983

FYI was an information series seen on the ABC network in the early 1980s. Hosted by Hal Linden (at the time the star of Barney Miller), the program features answers to questions that many viewers ask, from common questions such as, "What's the leading cause of burns in children?" to questions not many ask, but may be interesting to know, like "Can a child dance his/her way to better grades?" just to name a couple.

With each show lasting sixty seconds (including intros and outros), FYI was seen three times a day on weekdays, following ABC's popular soaps Ryan’s Hope, One Life to Live and General Hospital, using a formula not unlike ABC's Saturday morning mini-programs, such as Time for Timer, The Bod Squad and Schoolhouse Rock!

Two books based on the television series have been published, both by M. Evans and Company: FYI (For Your Information): Unexpected Answers to Everyday Questions (1982) and More FYI (For Your Information): Further Tips for Healthful Living (1983).
