= List of awards and nominations received by 24 =

This is the list of awards and nominations received by the television series 24 (2001–2010).

== By Awards ==
=== Primetime Emmy Award ===
Year	Category	Nominee(s)	Episode	Result
2002	Outstanding Drama Series	Robert Cochran, Howard Gordon, Brian Grazer, Stephen Hopkins, Tony Krantz, Joel Surnow, Cyrus Yavneh	—	Nominated
2002	Outstanding Lead Actor in a Drama Series	Kiefer Sutherland	"11:00 p.m. – 12:00 a.m"	Nominated
2002	Outstanding Directing for a Drama Series	Stephen Hopkins	"12:00 a.m. – 1:00 a.m."	Nominated
2002	Outstanding Writing for a Drama Series	Robert Cochran, Joel Surnow	"12:00 a.m. – 1:00 a.m."	Won
2002	Outstanding Single-Camera Picture Editing for a Series	Chris Willingham	"7:00 a.m. – 8:00 a.m."	Won
2002	Outstanding Single-Camera Picture Editing for a Series	David Thompson	"12:00 a.m. – 1:00 a.m."	Nominated
2002	Outstanding Art Direction for a Single-Camera Series	Carlos Barbosa, Tim Beach, Ellen Brill	"12:00 a.m. – 1:00 a.m."	Nominated
2002	Outstanding Casting for a Drama Series	Debi Manwiller	—	Nominated
2002	Outstanding Music Composition for a Series, Dramatic Underscore	Sean Callery	"7:00 a.m. – 8:00 a.m."	Nominated
2002	Outstanding Single-Camera Sound Mixing for a Series	William Gocke, Mike Olman, Ken Kobett	"12:00 a.m. – 1:00 a.m."	Nominated
2003	Outstanding Drama Series	Jon Cassar, Robert Cochran, Howard Gordon, Brian Grazer, Michael Loceff, Tony Krantz, Norman Powell, Joel Surnow, Kiefer Sutherland	—	Nominated
2003	Outstanding Lead Actor in a Drama Series	Kiefer Sutherland	"Day 2: 10:00 p.m. – 11:00 p.m."	Nominated
2003	Outstanding Directing for a Drama Series	Ian Toynton	"Day 2: 10:00 p.m. – 11:00 p.m."	Nominated
2003	Outstanding Music Composition for a Series, Dramatic Underscore	Sean Callery	"Day 2: 10:00 p.m. – 11:00 p.m."	Won
2003	Outstanding Single-Camera Picture Editing for a Series	Chris Willingham	"Day 2: 5:00 a.m. – 6:00 a.m."	Won
2003	Outstanding Single-Camera Picture Editing for a Series	Chris Willingham, David Latham	"Day 2: 8:00 a.m. – 9:00 a.m."	Nominated
2003	Outstanding Casting for a Drama Series	Debi Manwiller, Peggy Kennedy, Richard Pagano	—	Nominated
2003	Outstanding Single-Camera Sound Mixing for a Series	William Gocke, Mike Olman, Ken Kobett	"Day 2: 10:00 p.m. – 11:00 p.m."	Nominated
2003	Outstanding Stunt Coordination	Eddy Donno	"Day 2: 10:00 a.m. – 11:00 a.m."	Nominated
2004	Outstanding Drama Series	Jon Cassar, Robert Cochran, Howard Gordon, Brian Grazer, Tim Iacofano, Evan Katz, Stephen Kronish, Michael Loceff, Tony Krantz, Joel Surnow, Kiefer Sutherland	—	Nominated
2004	Outstanding Lead Actor in a Drama Series	Kiefer Sutherland	"Day 3: 12:00 p.m. – 1:00 p.m."	Nominated
2004	Outstanding Single-Camera Picture Editing for a Series	Chris Willingham, David Latham	"Day 3: 10:00 a.m. – 11:00 a.m."	Won
2004	Outstanding Single-Camera Sound Mixing for a Series	William Gocke, Mike Olman, Ken Kobett	"Day 3: 5:00 p.m. – 6:00 p.m."	Won
2004	Outstanding Sound Editing for a Series	William Dotson, Cathie Speakman, Pembrooke Andrews, Jeffrey Whitcher, Paul Menichini, Todd Morrissey, Shawn Kennelly, Jeff Charbonneau, Laura Macias, Vince Nicastro	"Day 3: 12:00 a.m. – 1:00 a.m."	Nominated
2004	Outstanding Music Composition for a Series, Dramatic Underscore	Sean Callery	"Day 3: 6:00 a.m. – 7:00 a.m."	Nominated
2004	Outstanding Casting for a Drama Series	Debi Manwiller, Peggy Kennedy, Richard Pagano	—	Won
2004	Outstanding Stunt Coordination	Gregory J. Barnett	"Day 3: 10:00 a.m. – 11:00 a.m."	Won
2005	Outstanding Drama Series	Jon Cassar, Robert Cochran, Howard Gordon, Brian Grazer, Tim Iacofano, Evan Katz, Stephen Kronish, Peter M. Lenkov, Michael Loceff, Joel Surnow, Kiefer Sutherland	—	Nominated
2005	Outstanding Lead Actor in a Drama Series	Kiefer Sutherland	Day 4: 2:00 a.m. – 3:00 a.m.	Nominated
2005	Outstanding Single-Camera Picture Editing for a Series	David Latham	"Day 4: 7:00 a.m. – 8:00 a.m."	Nominated
2005	Outstanding Single-Camera Picture Editing for a Series	Scott Powell	"Day 4: 6:00 a.m. – 7:00 a.m."	Nominated
2005	Outstanding Single-Camera Picture Editing for a Series	Chris Willingham	"Day 4: 7:00 p.m. – 8:00 p.m."	Nominated
2005	Outstanding Single-Camera Sound Mixing for a Series	William Gocke, Mike Olman, Ken Kobett	"Day 4: 6:00 a.m. – 7:00 a.m."	Won
2005	Outstanding Sound Editing for a Series	William Dotson, Cathie Speakman, Pembrooke Andrews, Jeffrey Whitcher, Shawn Kennelly, Jeff Charbonneau, Laura Macias, Vince Nicastro	"Day 4: 12:00 p.m. – 1:00 p.m."	Won
2005	Outstanding Music Composition for a Series, Dramatic Underscore	Sean Callery	"Day 4: 2:00 a.m. – 3:00 a.m."	Nominated
2005	Outstanding Stunt Coordination	Matthew Taylor	"Day 4: 12:00 p.m. – 1:00 p.m."	Won
2005	Outstanding Casting for a Drama Series	Debi Manwiller, Peggy Kennedy, Richard Pagano	—	Nominated
2005	Outstanding Cinematography for a Single-Camera Series	Rodney Charters	"Day 4: 5:00 a.m. – 6:00 a.m."	Nominated
2006	Outstanding Drama Series	Jon Cassar, Robert Cochran, Manny Coto, David Fury, Howard Gordon, Brian Grazer, Michael Klick, Evan Katz, Stephen Kronish, Michael Loceff, Joel Surnow, Kiefer Sutherland, Brad Turner	—	Won
2006	Outstanding Lead Actor in a Drama Series	Kiefer Sutherland	"Day 5: 7:00 a.m. – 8:00 a.m."	Won
2006	Outstanding Directing for a Drama Series	Jon Cassar	"Day 5: 7:00 a.m. – 8:00 a.m."	Won
2006	Outstanding Music Composition for a Series, Dramatic Underscore	Sean Callery	"Day 5: 6:00 a.m. – 7:00 a.m."	Won
2006	Outstanding Single-Camera Picture Editing for a Series	David Latham	"Day 5: 7:00 a.m. – 8:00 a.m."	Won
2006	Outstanding Single-Camera Picture Editing for a Series	Scott Powell	"Day 5: 9:00 p.m. – 10:00 p.m."	Nominated
2006	Outstanding Supporting Actor in a Drama Series	Gregory Itzin	"Day 5: 3:00 a.m. – 4:00 a.m." + "Day 5: 6:00 a.m. – 7:00 a.m."	Nominated
2006	Outstanding Supporting Actress in a Drama Series	Jean Smart	"Day 5: 5:00 a.m. – 6:00 a.m." + "Day 5: 6:00 a.m. – 7:00 a.m."	Nominated
2006	Outstanding Stunt Coordination	Jeff Cadiente	"Day 5: 9:00 p.m. – 10:00 p.m."	Nominated
2006	Outstanding Cinematography for a Single-Camera Series	Rodney Charters	"Day 5: 9:00 p.m. – 10:00 p.m."	Nominated
2006	Outstanding Single-Camera Sound Mixing for a Series	William Gocke, Mike Olman, Ken Kobett	"Day 5: 7:00 a.m. – 8:00 a.m."	Nominated
2006	Outstanding Sound Editing for a Series	William Dotson, Cathie Speakman, Pembrooke Andrews, Jeffrey Whitcher, Shawn Kennelly, Jeff Charbonneau, Laura Macias, Vince Nicastro, Rich Polanco	"Day 5: 9:00 p.m. – 10:00 p.m."	Nominated
2007	Outstanding Sound Editing for a Series	William Dotson, Cathie Speakman, Pembrooke Andrews, Jeffrey Whitcher, Shawn Kennelly, Jeff Charbonneau, Laura Macias, Vince Nicastro, Rich Polanco, Vic Radulich	"Day 6: 10:00 p.m. – 11:00 p.m."	Won
2007	Outstanding Lead Actor in a Drama Series	Kiefer Sutherland	"Day 6: 6:00 a.m. – 7:00 a.m."	Nominated
2007	Outstanding Guest Actress in a Drama Series	Jean Smart	"Day 6: 6:00 a.m. – 7:00 a.m."	Nominated
2007	Outstanding Music Composition for a Series, Dramatic Underscore	Sean Callery	"Day 6: 6:00 p.m. – 7:00 p.m."	Nominated
2007	Outstanding Stunt Coordination	Jeff Cadiente	"Day 6: 2:00 p.m. – 3:00 p.m."	Nominated
2007	Outstanding Sound Mixing for a Comedy or Drama Series, One Hour	William Gocke, Mike Olman, Ken Kobett, Jeff Gomillion	"Day 6: 10:00 p.m. – 11:00 p.m."	Nominated
2009	Outstanding Supporting Actress in a Drama Series	Cherry Jones	"Day 7: 7:00 a.m. – 8:00 a.m."	Won
2009	Outstanding Lead Actor in a Miniseries or a Movie	Kiefer Sutherland	24: Redemption	Nominated
2009	Outstanding Music Composition for a Miniseries, Movie or Special, Original Dramatic Score	Sean Callery	24: Redemption	Nominated
2009	Outstanding Music Composition for a Series, Dramatic Underscore	Sean Callery	"Day 7: 7:00 a.m. – 8:00 a.m."	Nominated
2009	Outstanding Single-Camera Picture Editing for a Miniseries or Movie	Scott Powell	24: Redemption	Nominated
2009	Outstanding Sound Mixing for a Miniseries or Movie	William Gocke, Mike Olman, Ken Kobett, Colin McFarlane	24: Redemption	Nominated
2009	Outstanding Sound Mixing for a Comedy or Drama Series, One Hour	William Gocke, Mike Olman, Ken Kobett	"Day 7: 10:00 p.m. – 11:00 p.m."	Nominated
2009	Outstanding Sound Editing for a Miniseries, Movie or Special	William Dotson, Cathie Speakman, Pembrooke Andrews, Jeffrey Whitcher, Shawn Kennelly, Melissa Kennelly, Daryl Fontenault, Jeff Charbonneau, Laura Macias, Vince Nicastro	24: Redemption	Nominated
2009	Outstanding Sound Editing for a Series	William Dotson, Cathie Speakman, Pembrooke Andrews, Jeffrey Whitcher, Shawn Kennelly, Melissa Kennelly, Daryl Fontenault, Jeff Charbonneau, Laura Macias, Vince Nicastro	"Day 7: 10:00 p.m. – 11:00 p.m."	Nominated
2009	Outstanding Single-Camera Picture Editing for a Drama Series	Scott Powell	"Day 7: 7:00 a.m. – 8:00 a.m."	Nominated
2009	Outstanding Stunt Coordination for a Drama Series	Jeff Cadiente	"Day 7: 5:00 p.m. – 6:00 p.m."	Nominated
2010	Outstanding Music Composition for a Series, Dramatic Underscore	Sean Callery	"Day 8: 3:00 p.m. – 4:00 p.m."	Won
2010	Outstanding Sound Editing for a Series	William Dotson, Cathie Speakman, Pembrooke Andrews, Jeffrey Whitcher, Shawn Kennelly, Melissa Kennelly, Daryl Fontenault, Jeff Charbonneau, Laura Macias, Vince Nicastro	"Day 8: 4:00 a.m. – 5:00 a.m."	Won
2010	Outstanding Guest Actor in a Drama Series	Gregory Itzin	"Day 8: 1:00 p.m. – 2:00 p.m."	Nominated
2010	Outstanding Stunt Coordination for a Drama Series	Jeff Cadiente	"Day 8: 6:00 p.m. – 7:00 p.m."	Nominated
2010	Outstanding Sound Mixing for a Comedy or Drama Series, One Hour	William Gocke, Mike Olman, Ken Kobett, Larold Rebhun	"Day 8: 3:00 p.m. – 4:00 p.m."	Nominated

=== Golden Globe Awards ===
Year	Category	Nominee(s)	Result
2001	Best Drama Series		Nominated
2001	Best Actor in a Drama Series	Kiefer Sutherland	Won
2002	Best Drama Series		Nominated
2002	Best Actor in a Drama Series	Kiefer Sutherland	Nominated
2002	Best Supporting Actor – Series, Miniseries, or Television Film	Dennis Haysbert	Nominated
2003	Best Drama Series		Won
2003	Best Actor in a Drama Series	Kiefer Sutherland	Nominated
2004	Best Drama Series		Nominated
2005	Best Actor in a Drama Series	Kiefer Sutherland	Nominated
2006	Best Drama Series		Nominated
2006	Best Actor in a Drama Series	Kiefer Sutherland	Nominated
2008	Best Actor in a Miniseries or TV Movie	Kiefer Sutherland for 24: Redemption	Nominated

=== Screen Actors Guild Awards ===
Year	Category	Nominee(s)	Result
2002	Outstanding Performance by a Male Actor in a Drama Series	Kiefer Sutherland	Nominated
2002	Outstanding Performance by an Ensemble in a Drama Series	Reiko Aylesworth; Xander Berkeley; Carlos Bernard; Jude Ciccolella; Sarah Clarke; Elisha Cuthbert; Michelle Forbes; Laura Harris; Dennis Haysbert; Leslie Hope; Penny Johnson Jerald; Phillip Rhys; Kiefer Sutherland; Sarah Wynter	Nominated
2003	Outstanding Performance by a Male Actor in a Drama Series	Kiefer Sutherland	Won
2004	Outstanding Performance by a Male Actor in a Drama Series	Kiefer Sutherland	Nominated
2004	Outstanding Performance by an Ensemble in a Drama Series	Reiko Aylesworth; Carlos Bernard; Elisha Cuthbert; James Badge Dale; Joaquim de Almeida; Dennis Haysbert; Mary Lynn Rajskub; Paul Schulze; Kiefer Sutherland	Nominated
2005	Outstanding Performance by a Male Actor in a Drama Series	Kiefer Sutherland	Won
2006	Outstanding Performance by a Male Actor in a Drama Series	Kiefer Sutherland	Nominated
2006	Outstanding Performance by an Ensemble in a Drama Series	Jayne Atkinson; Jude Ciccolella; Roger Cross; Gregory Itzin; Louis Lombardi; James Morrison; Glenn Morshower; Mary Lynn Rajskub; Kim Raver; Jean Smart; Kiefer Sutherland	Nominated
2007	Outstanding Performance by a Stunt Ensemble in a Television Series	Jeff Cadiente; Terri Cadiente; Troy Gilbert; Tracy Hite; Dustin Meier; Laurence Rosenthal; Erik Stabenau; Justin Sundquist	Won
2008	Outstanding Performance by a Male Actor in a Miniseries or Television Movie	Kiefer Sutherland for 24: Redemption	Nominated
2009	Outstanding Performance by a Stunt Ensemble in a Television Series	Jeff Cadiente; Brian Hite; Norman Howell; Christopher Leps; Dustin Meier; John Meier; Gary Price; Jimmy Sharp, Jr. Erik Stabenau; Justin Sundquist	Won

=== Satellite Awards ===
Year	Category	Nominee(s)	Result
2002	Best Drama Series		Won
2002	Best Actor in a Drama Series	Kiefer Sutherland	Won
2003	Best Drama Series		Nominated
2003	Best Actor in a Drama Series	Kiefer Sutherland	Won
2003	Best Supporting Actor – Television Series	Dennis Haysbert	Nominated
2003	Best Supporting Actress – Television Series	Sarah Clarke	Won
2004	Best DVD Release of TV Shows	24: Season Two (DVD)	Nominated
2005	Best DVD Release of TV Shows	24: Season Four (DVD)	Won
2005	Best DVD Release of TV Shows	24: Season Three (DVD)	Nominated
2005	Best Supporting Actress	Shohreh Aghdashloo	Nominated
2006	Best Drama Series		Nominated
2006	Best Supporting Actress	Jean Smart	Nominated
2008	Best Television Film	24: Redemption	Nominated
2009	Best Supporting Actress	Cherry Jones	Nominated

=== Directors Guild of America Awards ===
Year	Category	Nominee(s)	Result
2001	Best Directing for a Drama Series	Stephen Hopkins for "12:00 a.m. – 1:00 a.m."	Nominated
2003	Best Directing for a Drama Series	Jon Cassar for "Day 2: 7:00 a.m. – 8:00 a.m."	Nominated
2006	Best Directing for a Drama Series	Jon Cassar for "Day 5: 7:00 a.m. – 8:00 a.m."	Won

=== Producers Guild of America Awards ===
Year	Category	Nominee(s)	Result
2002	Television Producer of the Year Award in Episodic – Drama	Brian Grazer; Tony Krantz; Howard Gordon; Robert Cochran; Joel Surnow; Cyrus Yavneh	Won
2003	Television Producer of the Year Award in Episodic – Drama	Joel Surnow; Robert Cochran; Brian Grazer; Howard Gordon; Norman Powell	Nominated
2005	Television Producer of the Year Award in Episodic – Drama	Joel Surnow; Robert Cochran; Howard Gordon; Brian Grazer; Evan Katz; Jon Cassar; Stephen Kronish; Michael Loceff	Nominated
2006	Television Producer of the Year Award in Episodic – Drama	Joel Surnow; Robert Cochran; Howard Gordon; Evan Katz; Jon Cassar; Michael Loceff; Michael Klick	Nominated
2008	Television Producer of the Year Award in Long Form	Brian Grazer; Jon Cassar; Howard Gordon; Michael Klick for 24: Redemption	Nominated

=== Writers Guild of America Awards ===
Year	Category	Nominee(s)	Result
2003	Episodic Drama	Evan Katz for "Day 2: 7:00 p.m. – 8:00 p.m."	Won
2006	Dramatic Series	Robert Cochran; Manny Coto; Duppy Demetrius; David Ehrman; David Fury; Howard Gordon; Evan Katz; Stephen Kronish; Michael Loceff; Matt Michnovetz; Steve Mitchell; Sam Montgomery; Nicole Ranadive; Joel Surnow; Craig Van Sickle	Nominated

=== Television Critics Association Awards ===
Year	Category	Nominee(s)	Result
2002	Program of the Year		Won
2002	Outstanding New Program		Won
2002	Outstanding Achievement in Drama		Nominated
2002	Individual Achievement in Drama	Kiefer Sutherland	Nominated
2003	Outstanding Achievement in Drama		Nominated
2003	Individual Achievement in Drama	Kiefer Sutherland	Nominated
2004	Outstanding Achievement in Drama		Nominated
2004	Individual Achievement in Drama	Kiefer Sutherland	Nominated
2005	Outstanding Achievement in Drama		Nominated
2005	Individual Achievement in Drama	Kiefer Sutherland	Nominated
2006	Program of the Year		Nominated
2006	Outstanding Achievement in Drama		Nominated
2006	Individual Achievement in Drama	Kiefer Sutherland	Nominated
2009	Outstanding Achievement in Movies, Miniseries, and Specials	24: Redemption	Nominated
2010	Heritage Award		Nominated
