= List of awards and nominations received by Gilmore Girls =

List of awards and nominations for Gilmore Girls
Awards and nominations
Award	Wins	Nominations
AFI Awards	1	1
ALMA Awards	0	3
Family Television Awards	3	3
Golden Globe Awards	0	1
Golden Reel Awards	0	1
Make-Up Artists and Hair Stylists Guild Awards	0	1
People's Choice Awards	0	1
Primetime Emmy Awards	0	1
Satellite Awards	0	10
Screen Actors Guild Awards	0	2
TCA Awards	1	7
Teen Choice Awards	5	21
Young Artist Awards	3	6

Totals (Note: Certain award groups do not simply award one winner. They acknowledge several different recipients, have runners-up, and have third place. Since this is a specific recognition and is different from losing an award, runner-up mentions are considered wins in this award tally. For simplification and to avoid errors, each award in this list has been presumed to have had a prior nomination.)
- Wins: 13
- Nominations: 58

This is the list of awards and nominations received by the American comedy drama television series Gilmore Girls (2000–2007).

== Awards and nominations ==
Awards and nominations received by Weeds
Award	Year (Note: The listed year refers to the date of the ceremony, not necessarily the year in which the corresponding season or episode aired.)	Category	Nominee(s)	Result	Ref.
AFI Awards	2002	TV Program of the Year	Gilmore Girls	Won	
ALMA Awards	2001	Outstanding Actress in a New Television Series	Liz Torres	Nominated	
ALMA Awards	2006	Outstanding Actress in a Television Series	Alexis Bledel	Nominated	
ALMA Awards	2006	Outstanding Supporting Actress in a Television Series	Liz Torres	Nominated	
Family Television Awards	2001	New Series	Gilmore Girls	Won	
Family Television Awards	2001	Actress	Lauren Graham	Won (Note: Tied with Jane Kaczmarek for Malcolm in the Middle)	
Family Television Awards	2002	Actress	Alexis Bledel	Won	
Golden Globe Awards	2002	Best Performance by an Actress in a Television Series – Drama	Lauren Graham	Nominated	
Golden Reel Awards	2005	Best Sound Editing in Television Short Form – Dialogue & ADR	Eileen Horta, Sonya Lindsay, David Beadle, Patrick Hogan (Note: Additional crew: David Davenport (assistant dialogue/ADR editor), Daniel Church (production sound mixer), Edie Mirman (loop group supervisor), Troy Porter, Jeff Courdie, Dean St. John (ADR mixers), Dennis Kirk (dialogue re-recording mixer)) (for "You Jump, I Jump, Jack")	Nominated	
Make-Up Artists and Hair Stylists Guild Awards	2003	Best Period Hair Styling – Television Series	Patricia Vecchio, Maria Elena, Romy Fleming	Nominated	
People's Choice Awards	2005	Favorite TV Dramatic Series	Gilmore Girls	Nominated	
Primetime Creative Arts Emmy Awards	2004	Outstanding Makeup for a Series (Non-Prosthetic)	Marie Del Prete, Malanie Romero, Mike Smithson (for "The Festival of Living Art")	Won	
Satellite Awards	2002	Best Performance by an Actress in a Series, Musical or Comedy	Lauren Graham	Nominated	
Satellite Awards	2003	Best Television Series, Musical or Comedy	Gilmore Girls	Nominated	
Satellite Awards	2003	Best Performance by an Actress in a Series, Musical or Comedy	Lauren Graham	Nominated	
Satellite Awards	2003	Best Performance by an Actress in a Series, Musical or Comedy	Alexis Bledel	Nominated	
Satellite Awards	2003	Best Actress in a Supporting Role in a Series, Musical or Comedy	Kelly Bishop	Nominated	
Satellite Awards	2004	Best Performance by an Actress in a Series, Musical or Comedy	Lauren Graham	Nominated	
Satellite Awards	2004	Best Actress in a Supporting Role in a Series, Musical or Comedy	Kelly Bishop	Nominated	
Satellite Awards	2005	Best Television Series, Musical or Comedy	Gilmore Girls	Nominated	
Satellite Awards	2005	Best Performance by an Actress in a Series, Musical or Comedy	Lauren Graham	Nominated	
Satellite Awards	2005	Best Performance by an Actress in a Series, Musical or Comedy	Lauren Graham	Nominated	
Screen Actors Guild Awards	2001	Outstanding Performance by a Female Actor in a Drama Series	Lauren Graham	Nominated	
Screen Actors Guild Awards	2002	Outstanding Performance by a Female Actor in a Drama Series	Lauren Graham	Nominated	
TCA Awards	2001	Program of the Year	Gilmore Girls	Nominated	
TCA Awards	2001	Outstanding New Program of the Year	Gilmore Girls	Won	
TCA Awards	2001	Outstanding Achievement in Drama	Gilmore Girls	Nominated	
TCA Awards	2002	Outstanding Achievement in Drama	Gilmore Girls	Nominated	
TCA Awards	2002	Individual Achievement in Drama	Lauren Graham	Nominated	
TCA Awards	2005	Outstanding Achievement in Comedy	Gilmore Girls	Nominated	
TCA Awards	2006	Individual Achievement in Comedy	Lauren Graham	Nominated	
Teen Choice Awards	2001	TV – Choice Drama	Gilmore Girls	Nominated	
Teen Choice Awards	2001	TV – Choice Actress	Alexis Bledel	Nominated	
Teen Choice Awards	2001	TV – Choice Sidekick	Keiko Agena	Nominated	
Teen Choice Awards	2002	TV – Choice Drama	Gilmore Girls	Nominated	
Teen Choice Awards	2002	TV – Choice Actress	Alexis Bledel	Nominated	
Teen Choice Awards	2002	TV – Choice Actor	Jared Padalecki	Nominated	
Teen Choice Awards	2002	TV – Choice Breakout TV Star: Male	Milo Ventimiglia	Nominated	
Teen Choice Awards	2002	TV – Choice Sidekick	Keiko Agena	Nominated	
Teen Choice Awards	2003	Choice TV – Comedy	Gilmore Girls	Nominated	
Teen Choice Awards	2003	Choice TV Sidekick	Keiko Agena	Nominated	
Teen Choice Awards	2004	Choice TV – Comedy	Gilmore Girls	Nominated	
Teen Choice Awards	2004	Choice TV Actress – Comedy	Alexis Bledel	Nominated	
Teen Choice Awards	2005	Choice TV – Comedy	Gilmore Girls	Won	
Teen Choice Awards	2005	Choice TV Actress – Comedy	Alexis Bledel	Won	
Teen Choice Awards	2005	Choice TV – Male Breakout Star	Matt Czuchry	Nominated	
Teen Choice Awards	2005	Choice TV – Chemistry	Alexis Bledel, Matt Czuchry	Nominated	
Teen Choice Awards	2005	Choice TV – Parental Unit	Lauren Graham	Won	
Teen Choice Awards	2006	Choice TV – Comedy	Gilmore Girls	Nominated	
Teen Choice Awards	2006	Choice TV Actress – Comedy	Alexis Bledel	Won	
Teen Choice Awards	2006	Choice TV – Chemistry	Alexis Bledel, Matt Czuchry	Nominated	
Teen Choice Awards	2006	Choice TV – Parental Unit	Lauren Graham	Won	
Young Artist Awards	2001	Best Family TV Drama Series	Gilmore Girls	Won	
Young Artist Awards	2001	Best Performance in a TV Drama Series – Leading Young Actress	Alexis Bledel	Won	
Young Artist Awards	2002	Best Performance in a TV Drama Series – Leading Young Actress	Alexis Bledel	Nominated	
Young Artist Awards	2002	Best Performance in a TV Drama Series – Leading Young Actress	Keiko Agena	Won	
Young Artist Awards	2002	Best Performance in a TV Series (Comedy or Drama) – Young Actor Age Ten or Under	Kendall Schmidt	Nominated	
Young Artist Awards	2004	Best Performance in a TV Series – Recurring Young Actress	Scout Taylor-Compton	Nominated	
