= List of awards and nominations received by Everybody Hates Chris =

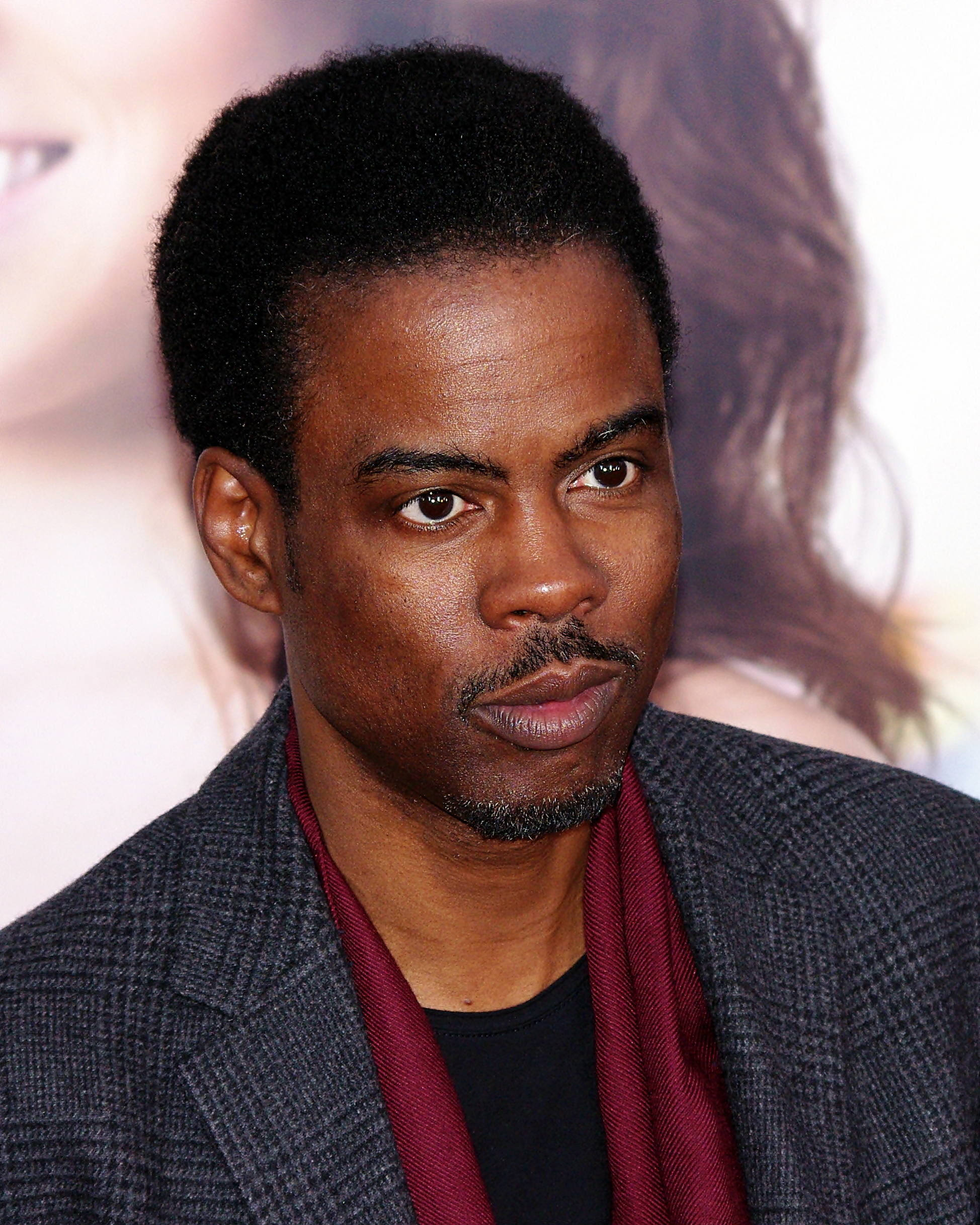
Series creator Chris Rock in 2012.

Everybody Hates Chris is an American television period sitcom. Inspired by the teenage years of comedian Chris Rock, the show is set from 1982 to 1987. The show was created by Rock and Ali LeRoi. It debuted on UPN on September 22, 2005. The following year, UPN merged with The WB to form The CW, where the sitcom aired for its remaining three seasons. Its final episode aired on May 8, 2009.

During its run, the series was nominated for numerous awards including a Golden Globe Award, three Emmy Awards, a People's Choice Award, and a Writers Guild of America Award. The series won NAACP Image Awards for outstanding actor, actress, and writing in a comedy series.

Award	Year	Category	Nominee	Result	Ref.
AFI Awards	2007	Top 10 Television Programs		Won	
Environmental Media Awards	2008	Episodic Comedy		Nominated	
Golden Globe Awards	2006	Best TV Series		Nominated	
Motion Picture Sound Editors Awards	2005	Best Sound Editing in TV Short Form - Music	Stan Jones and Joshua Winget for episode "Everybody Hates Halloween"	Nominated	
Motion Picture Sound Editors Awards	2005	Best Sound Editing in Television Short Form - Dialogue and ADR	Wilson Dyer and Marti D. Humphrey for episode "Everybody Hates Basketball"	Nominated	
NAACP Image Awards	2010	Outstanding Actor in a Comedy Series	Tyler James Williams	Nominated	
NAACP Image Awards	2010	Outstanding Actress in a Comedy Series	Tichina Arnold	Nominated	
NAACP Image Awards	2010	Outstanding Comedy Series		Nominated	
NAACP Image Awards	2010	Outstanding Directing in a Comedy Series	Ali LeRoi for the episode "Everybody Hates the G.E.D."	Nominated	
NAACP Image Awards	2009	Outstanding Actor in a Comedy Series	Tyler James Williams	Nominated	
NAACP Image Awards	2009	Outstanding Actor in a Comedy Series	Terry Crews	Nominated	
NAACP Image Awards	2009	Outstanding Actress in a Comedy Series	Tichina Arnold	Nominated	
NAACP Image Awards	2009	Outstanding Comedy Series		Nominated	
NAACP Image Awards	2009	Outstanding Directing in a Comedy Series	Ali LeRoi for episode "Everybody Hates Port Authority"	Nominated	
NAACP Image Awards	2008	Outstanding Writing in a Comedy Series	Ali LeRoi for episode "Everybody Hates Guidance Counselor”	Won	
NAACP Image Awards	2008	Outstanding Actor in a Comedy Series	Tyler James Williams	Nominated	
NAACP Image Awards	2008	Outstanding Supporting Actor in a Comedy Series	Terry Crews	Nominated	
NAACP Image Awards	2008	Outstanding Actress in a Comedy Series	Tichina Arnold	Nominated	
NAACP Image Awards	2008	Outstanding Comedy Series		Nominated	
NAACP Image Awards	2008	Outstanding Directing in a Comedy Series	Ali LeRoi for episode "Everybody Hates Baseball"	Nominated	
NAACP Image Awards	2008	Outstanding Directing in a Comedy Series	Millicent Shelton for episode "Everybody Hates the Substitute"	Nominated	
NAACP Image Awards	2007	Outstanding Actor in a Comedy Series	Tyler James Williams	Won	
NAACP Image Awards	2007	Outstanding Actress in a Comedy Series	Tichina Arnold	Nominated	
NAACP Image Awards	2007	Outstanding Supporting Actor in a Comedy Series	Terry Crews	Nominated	
NAACP Image Awards	2007	Outstanding Supporting Actor in a Comedy Series	Antonio Fargas	Nominated	
NAACP Image Awards	2007	Outstanding Supporting Actress in a Comedy Series	Whoopi Goldberg	Nominated	
NAACP Image Awards	2007	Outstanding Comedy Series		Nominated	
NAACP Image Awards	2007	Outstanding Directing in a Comedy Series	Ali LeRoi for episode "Everybody Hates Elections"	Nominated	
NAACP Image Awards	2007	Outstanding Directing in a Comedy Series	Millicent Shelton for episode "Everybody Hates Valentine's Day"	Nominated	
NAACP Image Awards	2006	Outstanding Actress in a Comedy Series	Tichina Arnold	Won	
NAACP Image Awards	2006	Outstanding Comedy Series		Won	
NAACP Image Awards	2006	Outstanding Actor in a Comedy Series	Tyler James Williams	Nominated	
NAACP Image Awards	2006	Outstanding Supporting Actor in a Comedy Series	Terry Crews	Nominated	
NAACP Image Awards	2006	Outstanding Directing in a Comedy Series	Ken Whittingham	Nominated	
People's Choice Awards	2006	Favorite New Television Comedy		Nominated	
Primetime Emmy Awards	2009	Outstanding Cinematography for Single-camera Series	Mark Doering-Powell for episode "Everybody Hates Back Talk"	Nominated	
Primetime Emmy Awards	2006	Outstanding Cinematography for Single-Camera Series	Mark Doering-Powell for episode "Everybody Hates Funerals"	Nominated	
Primetime Emmy Awards	2006	Outstanding Costumes for a Series	Darryle Johnson and Sharlene Williams	Nominated	
Satellite Awards	2006	Best TV Series		Nominated	
Teen Choice Awards	2006	TV - Choice Actor: Comedy	Tyler James Williams	Nominated	
Teen Choice Awards	2006	TV - Choice Actress: Comedy	Tichina Arnold	Nominated	
Teen Choice Awards	2006	TV - Choice Sidekick: Comedy	Vincent Martella	Nominated	
Teen Choice Awards	2006	TV - Choice Parental Unit	Tichina Arnold and Terry Crews	Nominated	
Teen Choice Awards	2006	TV - Choice Comedy/Musical Show		Nominated	
Teen Choice Awards	2006	TV - Choice Breakout Show		Nominated	
Television Critics Association Awards	2006	Outstanding Achievement in Comedy		Nominated	
Television Critics Association Awards	2006	Outstanding New Program of the Year		Nominated	
Writers Guild of America Awards	2006	New Series	Aron Abrams, Rodney Barnes, Craig DiGregorio, Alyson Fouse, Howard Gewirtz, Ali LeRoi, Courtney Lilly, Chris Rock, Gregory Thompson, and Kriss Turner	Nominated	
Young Artist Awards	2009	Best Performance in a TV Series - Guest Starring Young Actress	Car'ynn Sims	Nominated	
Young Artist Awards	2008	Best Performance in a TV Series - Leading Young Actor	Tyler James Williams	Nominated	
Young Artist Awards	2008	Best Performance in a TV Series (Comedy) - Supporting Young Actor	Vincent Martella	Nominated	
Young Artist Awards	2007	Best Performance in a TV Series (Comedy or Drama) - Leading Young Actor	Tyler James Williams	Nominated	
Young Artist Awards	2006	Best Television Series - Comedy		Won	
Young Artist Awards	2006	Best Performance in a TV Series (Comedy or Drama) - Leading Young Actor	Tyler James Williams	Nominated	
Young Artist Awards	2006	Best Performance in a TV Series (Comedy) - Supporting Young Actor	Vincent Martella	Nominated	
