= List of awards and nominations received by Matt LeBlanc =

Matt LeBlanc awards and nominations
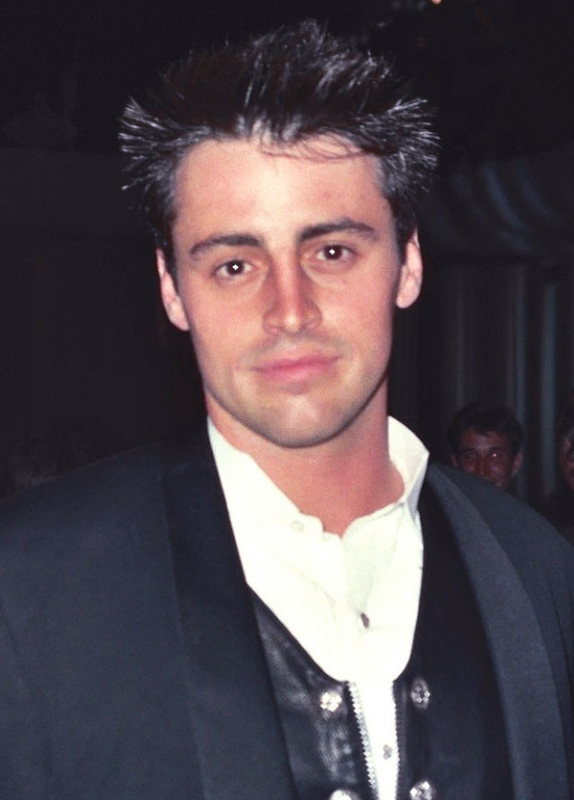
- LeBlanc at the 1995 Emmy Awards
Award	Wins	Nominations
Primetime Emmy Award	0	8
Screen Actors Guild Award	1	8
Golden Globe Awards	1	5

Matt LeBlanc is an American actor, comedian, writer, and producer.

LeBlanc gained worldwide recognition for his role as Joey Tribbiani in the American sitcom Friends (1994-2004). He followed the series within a short lived spinoff series featured on his character entitled, Joey (2004-2006). He then starred as himself in the critically acclaimed British-American series Episodes (2011-2017). He then starred as Adam Burns in the CBS sitcom Man with a Plan (2016-2020).

He has received various awards and nominations including seven Primetime Emmy Award for Outstanding Lead Actor in a Comedy Series nominations for his work in Friends and Episodes. He also received eight Screen Actors Guild Award nominations winning in 1995 for Outstanding Performance by an Ensemble in a Comedy Series with the cast of Friends.

== Major associations ==
=== Primetime Emmy Awards ===
Year	Category	Nominated work	Result	Ref.
2002	Outstanding Lead Actor in a Comedy Series	Friends	Nominated	
2003	Outstanding Lead Actor in a Comedy Series	Friends	Nominated	
2004	Outstanding Lead Actor in a Comedy Series	Friends	Nominated	
2011	Outstanding Lead Actor in a Comedy Series	Episodes	Nominated	
2013	Outstanding Lead Actor in a Comedy Series	Episodes	Nominated	
2014	Outstanding Lead Actor in a Comedy Series	Episodes	Nominated	
2015	Outstanding Lead Actor in a Comedy Series	Episodes	Nominated	
2021	Outstanding Variety Special (Pre-Recorded)	Friends: The Reunion	Nominated	

=== Golden Globe Awards ===
Year	Category	Nominated work	Result	Ref.
2003	Best Actor in a Television Series – Musical or Comedy	Friends	Nominated	
2004	Best Actor in a Television Series – Musical or Comedy	Friends	Nominated	
2005	Best Actor in a Television Series – Musical or Comedy	Joey	Nominated	
2012	Best Actor in a Television Series – Musical or Comedy	Episodes	Won	
2013	Best Actor in a Television Series – Musical or Comedy	Episodes	Nominated	

=== Screen Actors Guild Awards ===
Year	Category	Nominated work	Result	Ref.
1996	Outstanding Ensemble in a Comedy Series	Friends	Won	
1999	Outstanding Ensemble in a Comedy Series	Friends	Nominated	
2000	Outstanding Ensemble in a Comedy Series	Friends	Nominated	
2001	Outstanding Ensemble in a Comedy Series	Friends	Nominated	
2002	Outstanding Ensemble in a Comedy Series	Friends	Nominated	
2003	Outstanding Ensemble in a Comedy Series	Friends	Nominated	
2003	Outstanding Male Actor in a Comedy Series	Friends	Nominated	
2004	Outstanding Ensemble in a Comedy Series	Friends	Nominated	

== Miscellaneous awards ==
=== American Comedy Awards ===
Year	Category	Nominated work	Result	Ref.
2000	Funniest Supporting Male - Television Series	Friends	Nominated	

=== Nickelodeon Kids' Choice Awards ===
Year	Category	Nominated work	Result	Ref.
2002	Favorite Television Actor	Friends	Nominated	

=== People's Choice Awards ===
Year	Category	Nominated work	Result	Ref.
2005	Favorite Male Television Star	Joey	Won	
2017	Favorite Actor in a New TV Series	Man with a Plan	Won	

=== Teen Choice Awards ===
Year	Category	Nominated work	Result	Ref.
2002	Choice TV Actor - Comedy	Friends	Won	
2003	Choice TV Actor - Comedy	Friends	Nominated	
2004	Choice TV Actor - Comedy	Friends	Nominated	
2005	Choice TV Actor - Comedy	Joey	Nominated	

=== Television Critics Association Awards ===
Year	Category	Nominated work	Result	Ref.
2002	Outstanding Individual Achievement in Comedy	Friends	Nominated	

=== Satellite Awards ===
Year	Category	Nominated work	Result	Ref.
2003	Best Lead Actor in a Series - Comedy or Musical	Friends	Nominated	
2004	Best Supporting Actor - Musical or Comedy Series	Friends	Nominated	
2011	Best Lead Actor in a Series - Comedy or Musical	Episodes	Nominated	

=== TV Guide Awards ===
Year	Category	Nominated work	Result	Ref.
2000	Editor's Choice Award	Friends	Won	
