= TCA Award for Outstanding Achievement in News and Information =

Annual US television award

The TCA Award for Outstanding Achievement in News and Information is an award given by the Television Critics Association.

== Winners and nominees ==
Year	Winner	Other Nominees
1984–1985 (1st)	Ted Koppel – Nightline (ABC)	n/a
1985–1986 (2nd)	Ted Koppel – Nightline (ABC) and Bill Moyers – The Vanishing Family: Crisis in Black America (CBS)	CNN
1986–1987 (3rd)	Eyes on the Prize (PBS)	n/a
1987–1988 (4th)	CNN and Nightline (ABC)	n/a
1988–1989 (5th)	CNN	C-SPAN; Frontline (PBS); Nightline (ABC)
1989–1990 (6th)	CNN	Eyes on the Prize II (PBS); Frontline (PBS); Nightline (ABC); World News Tonight with Peter Jennings (ABC)
1990–1991 (7th)	Gulf War coverage (CNN)	Peter Arnett; The Civil War (PBS); Frontline (PBS); Nightline (ABC)
1991–1992 (8th)	Frontline (PBS)	C-SPAN; Russian coup coverage (CNN); Nightline (ABC)
1992–1993 (9th)	Frontline (PBS)	60 Minutes (CBS); Nightline (ABC); POV (PBS); World News Tonight with Peter Jennings (ABC)
1993–1994 (10th)	Nightline (ABC)	60 Minutes (CBS); CBS News Sunday Morning (CBS); Frontline (PBS); The MacNeil/Lehrer NewsHour (PBS)
1994–1995 (11th)	Frontline (PBS) and Nightline (ABC)	CNN; The O. J. Simpson Trial coverage (CNN); The MacNeil/Lehrer NewsHour (PBS)
1995–1996 (12th)	Frontline (PBS)	CNN; 20/20 (ABC); 60 Minutes (CBS); Nightline (ABC)
1996–1997 (13th)	The American Experience (PBS)	20/20 (ABC); 60 Minutes (CBS); Frontline (PBS); Nightline (ABC)
1997–1998 (14th)	The American Experience (PBS)	60 Minutes (CBS); Dateline (NBC); Frontline (PBS); Nightline (ABC)
1998–1999 (15th)	Cold War (CNN)	60 Minutes (CBS); The American Experience (PBS); The Century (ABC / The History Channel); The Farmer's Wife (PBS)
1999–2000 (16th)	ABC 2000: The Millennium (ABC)	60 Minutes (CBS); The American President (PBS); Frontline (PBS); Walking with Dinosaurs (Discovery Channel)
2000–2001 (17th)	Jazz (PBS)	60 Minutes (CBS); America Undercover (HBO); Frontline (PBS); On Our Own Terms: Moyers on Dying (PBS)
2001–2002 (18th)	Frontline (PBS)	60 Minutes (CBS); American Masters (PBS); Nightline (ABC); The O'Reilly Factor (Fox News Channel)
2002–2003 (19th)	Frontline (PBS)	David Bloom (NBC); 60 Minutes (CBS); The Daily Show with Jon Stewart (Comedy Central); Nightline (ABC)
2003–2004 (20th)	The Daily Show with Jon Stewart (Comedy Central)	60 Minutes (CBS); Frontline (PBS); Meet the Press (NBC); Nightline (ABC)
2004–2005 (21st)	Frontline (PBS)	60 Minutes: Sunday Edition (CBS); The Daily Show with Jon Stewart (Comedy Central); Meet the Press (NBC); The News Hour with Jim Lehrer (PBS); Nightline (ABC)
2005–2006 (22nd)	Frontline (PBS)	60 Minutes (CBS); American Masters: Newhart (PBS); Broadway: The Golden Age (PBS); Country Boys (PBS)
2006–2007 (23rd)	Planet Earth (Discovery Channel)	Baghdad ER (HBO); Bill Moyers Journal (PBS); Galápagos (National Geographic Channel); When the Levees Broke (HBO)
2007–2008 (24th)	The War (PBS)	Alive Day Memories: Home from Iraq (HBO); Frontline (PBS); Nimrod Nation (Sundance Channel); This American Life (Showtime)
2008–2009 (25th)	The Alzheimer's Project (HBO)	60 Minutes (CBS); Frontline (PBS); The Rachel Maddow Show (MSNBC); We Shall Remain (PBS)
2009–2010 (26th)	Life (Discovery Channel)	30 for 30 (ESPN); America: The Story of Us (History); The Daily Show with Jon Stewart (Comedy Central); The Rachel Maddow Show (MSNBC)
2010–2011 (27th)	Restrepo (National Geographic Channel)	30 for 30 (ESPN); 60 Minutes (CBS); If God Is Willing and da Creek Don't Rise (HBO); The Rachel Maddow Show (MSNBC)
2011–2012 (28th)	60 Minutes (CBS)	Anderson Cooper 360° (CNN); The Daily Show with Jon Stewart (Comedy Central); Frontline (PBS); The Rachel Maddow Show (MSNBC)
2012–2013 (29th)	The Central Park Five (PBS)	60 Minutes (CBS); Anderson Cooper 360° (CNN); The Daily Show with Jon Stewart (Comedy Central); The Rachel Maddow Show (MSNBC)
2013–2014 (30th)	Cosmos: A Spacetime Odyssey (Fox / National Geographic Channel)	60 Minutes (CBS); CBS News Sunday Morning (CBS); The Daily Show with Jon Stewart (Comedy Central); Frontline (PBS)
2014–2015 (31st)	Last Week Tonight with John Oliver (HBO)	60 Minutes (CBS); CBS News Sunday Morning (CBS); The Daily Show with Jon Stewart (Comedy Central); Frontline (PBS)
2015–2016 (32nd)	Full Frontal with Samantha Bee (TBS)	CBS Sunday Morning (CBS); Jackie Robinson (PBS); Last Week Tonight with John Oliver (HBO); Real Time with Bill Maher (HBO); United Shades of America (CNN)
2016–2017 (33rd)	O.J.: Made in America (ESPN)	Full Frontal with Samantha Bee (TBS); Last Week Tonight with John Oliver (HBO); The Lead with Jake Tapper (CNN); Planet Earth II (BBC America); Weiner (Showtime)
2017–2018 (34th)	Anthony Bourdain: Parts Unknown (CNN)	60 Minutes (CBS); Blue Planet II (BBC America); The Rachel Maddow Show (MSNBC); The Vietnam War (PBS); Wild Wild Country (Netflix)
2018–2019 (35th)	Leaving Neverland (HBO)	60 Minutes (CBS); America to Me (Starz); Our Planet (Netflix); The Rachel Maddow Show (MSNBC); Surviving R. Kelly (Lifetime)
2019–2020 (36th)	The Last Dance (ESPN)	60 Minutes (CBS); Frontline (PBS); Hillary (Hulu); McMillions (HBO); The Rachel Maddow Show (MSNBC)
2020–2021 (37th)	Framing Britney Spears (FX/FX on Hulu)	60 Minutes (CBS); Allen v. Farrow (HBO); City So Real (National Geographic); Frontline (PBS); I'll Be Gone in the Dark (HBO); Oprah with Meghan and Harry: A CBS Primetime Special (CBS); The Rachel Maddow Show (MSNBC)
2021–2022 (38th)	The Beatles: Get Back (Disney+)	60 Minutes (CBS); Benjamin Franklin (PBS); Frontline (PBS); George Carlin's American Dream (HBO); How To with John Wilson (HBO); Prehistoric Planet (Apple TV+); The Tinder Swindler (Netflix); We Need to Talk About Cosby (Showtime)
2022–2023 (39th)	The U.S. and the Holocaust (PBS)	The 1619 Project (Hulu); 30 for 30 (ESPN); Free Chol Soo Lee (PBS); Frontline (PBS); Pepsi, Where's My Jet? (Netflix); Stolen Youth: Inside the Cult at Sarah Lawrence (Hulu); Taste the Nation with Padma Lakshmi (Hulu)
2023-2024 (40th)	Quiet on Set: The Dark Side of Kids TV (Investigation Discovery)	America Outdoors with Baratunde Thurston (PBS); Frontline (PBS); The Jinx: Part Two (HBO / Max); Queens (National Geographic); Telemarketers (HBO / Max)
2024-2025 (41st)	Pee-wee as Himself (HBO)	60 Minutes (CBS); The Americas (NBC); Frontline (PBS); Bad Influence: The Dark Side of Kidfluencing (Netflix); Leonardo da Vinci (PBS); PBS News Hour (PBS); We Will Dance Again (Paramount+)
2025–2026 (42nd)	The American Revolution (PBS)	60 Minutes (CBS); CBS This Morning (CBS); Disneyland Handcrafted (Disney+); Frontline (PBS); Have I Got News For You (CNN); Marty, Life Is Short (Netflix); Mr. Scorsese (Apple TV)

== Networks with multiple wins ==
- PBS - 16
- ABC - 6
- CNN - 6
- HBO/Max - 4
- Discovery Channel – 2
- ESPN - 2
- National Geographic Channel – 2
- Investigation Discovery – 1

== See also ==
- Peabody Awards
- Primetime Emmy Award for Outstanding Documentary or Nonfiction Series
- Primetime Emmy Award for Outstanding Documentary or Nonfiction Special
