= 4th TCA Awards =

US television awards ceremony in 1988

- Date: August 5, 1988
- Venue: Registry Hotel, Los Angeles, California

Highlights
- Program of the Year: Dear America: Letters Home from Vietnam

The 4th TCA Awards were presented by the Television Critics Association. The ceremony was held on August 5, 1988, at the Registry Hotel in Los Angeles, Calif.

== Winners ==
Category	Winner
Program of the Year	Dear America: Letters Home from Vietnam (HBO)
Outstanding Achievement in Comedy	Frank's Place (CBS) and The Wonder Years (ABC)
Outstanding Achievement in Drama	St. Elsewhere (NBC)
Outstanding Achievement in Specials	Dear America: Letters Home from Vietnam (HBO)
Outstanding Achievement in Children's Programming	Degrassi Junior High (PBS)
Outstanding Achievement in News and Information	CNN and Nightline (ABC)
Outstanding Achievement in Sports	1988 Winter Olympics (ABC)
Career Achievement Award	David Brinkley

=== Multiple wins ===
The following shows received multiple wins:

Wins	Recipient
2	Dear America: Letters Home from Vietnam
