= 6th TCA Awards =

US television awards ceremony in 1990

- Date: July 20, 1990
- Venue: Century Plaza Hotel, Los Angeles, California

Highlights
- Program of the Year: Twin Peaks

The 6th TCA Awards were presented by the Television Critics Association. The ceremony was held on July 20, 1990, at the Century Plaza Hotel in Los Angeles, Calif.

== Winners and nominees ==
Category	Winner	Other Nominees
Program of the Year	Twin Peaks (ABC)	Eyes on the Prize II (PBS); L.A. Law (NBC); The Simpsons (Fox)
Outstanding Achievement in Comedy	The Simpsons (Fox)	Designing Women (CBS); Murphy Brown (CBS); Newhart (CBS); The Wonder Years (ABC)
Outstanding Achievement in Drama	Twin Peaks (ABC)	The Final Days (ABC); L.A. Law (NBC); Shannon's Deal (NBC); thirtysomething (ABC)
Outstanding Achievement in Specials	Sammy Davis Jr.'s 60th Anniversary Celebration (ABC)	Billy Crystal; Carmen on Ice (HBO); Comic Relief '90 (HBO); Kennedy Center Honors (CBS)
Outstanding Achievement in Children's Programming	Jim Henson	Babar (HBO); Degrassi High (PBS); Sesame Street (PBS); WonderWorks (PBS)
Outstanding Achievement in News and Information	CNN	Eyes on the Prize II (PBS); Frontline (PBS); Nightline (ABC); World News Tonight with Peter Jennings (ABC)
Outstanding Achievement in Sports	1989 World Series (ABC)	1990 Kentucky Derby (ABC); Mike Tyson vs. Buster Douglas (HBO); SportsCenter (ESPN)
Career Achievement Award	Jim Henson	Roone Arledge; Carol Burnett; Bob Newhart; Ted Turner

=== Multiple wins ===
The following shows received multiple wins:

Wins	Recipient
2	Twin Peaks

=== Multiple nominations ===
The following shows received multiple nominations:

Nominations	Recipient
2	Eyes on the Prize II
2	L.A. Law
2	The Simpsons
2	Twin Peaks
