= 7th TCA Awards =

US television awards ceremony in 1991

- Date: July 26, 1991
- Venue: Universal City Hilton, Los Angeles, California

Highlights
- Program of the Year: The Civil War

The 7th TCA Awards were presented by the Television Critics Association. The ceremony was held on July 26, 1991, at the Universal City Hilton in Los Angeles, Calif.

== Winners and nominees ==
Category	Winner	Other Nominees
Program of the Year	The Civil War (PBS)	Gulf War coverage (CNN); Northern Exposure (CBS)
Outstanding Achievement in Comedy	Murphy Brown (CBS)	Cheers (NBC); Northern Exposure (CBS); The Simpsons (Fox)
Outstanding Achievement in Drama	thirtysomething (ABC)	The Civil War (PBS); Law & Order (NBC); Northern Exposure (CBS); Separate but Equal (ABC)
Outstanding Achievement in Specials	The Civil War (PBS)	Billy Crystal; The Very Best of the Ed Sullivan Show (CBS)
Outstanding Achievement in Children's Programming	War in the Gulf: Answering Children's Questions (ABC)	Nickelodeon; Dinosaurs (ABC); Pee-wee's Playhouse (CBS); Sesame Street (PBS); Tiny Toon Adventures (Syndicated)
Outstanding Achievement in News and Information	Gulf War coverage (CNN)	Peter Arnett; The Civil War (PBS); Frontline (PBS); Nightline (ABC)
Outstanding Achievement in Sports	1991 NCAA Final Four (CBS)	Super Bowl XXV (ABC); Baseball Tonight (ESPN); SportsCenter (ESPN)
Career Achievement Award	Brandon Tartikoff	Roone Arledge; Bill Moyers; Ted Turner

=== Multiple wins ===
The following shows received multiple wins:

Wins	Recipient
2	The Civil War

=== Multiple nominations ===
The following shows received multiple nominations:

Nominations	Recipient
4	The Civil War
3	Northern Exposure
