= 3rd TCA Awards =

US television awards ceremony in 1987

- Date: July 28, 1987

Highlights
- Program of the Year: Eyes on the Prize

The 3rd TCA Awards were presented by the Television Critics Association. The ceremony was held on July 28, 1987.

== Winners ==
Category	Winner
Program of the Year	Eyes on the Prize (PBS)
Outstanding Achievement in Comedy	It's Garry Shandling's Show (Showtime)
Outstanding Achievement in Drama	L.A. Law (NBC)
Outstanding Achievement in Specials	Robin Williams: An Evening at the Met (HBO)
Outstanding Achievement in Children's Programming	Pee-wee's Playhouse (CBS)
Outstanding Achievement in News and Information	Eyes on the Prize (PBS)
Outstanding Achievement in Sports	1987 America's Cup (ESPN)
Career Achievement Award	Hill Street Blues (NBC)

=== Multiple wins ===
The following shows received multiple wins:

Wins	Recipient
2	Eyes on the Prize
