= TCA Award for Outstanding Achievement in Youth Programming =

Television award

The TCA Award for Outstanding Achievement in Youth Programming is an award given by the Television Critics Association. Beginning with the 39th ceremony in 2023 the category was split into programming created for children under seven, awarded under "Children's Programming", and programs for older youths, awarded under "Family Programming".

== Winners and nominees ==
| Year | Category | Winner | Other Nominees |
|---|---|---|---|
| 1984–1985 (1st) | —N/a | Faerie Tale Theatre (Showtime) | —N/a |
| 1985–1986 (2nd) | —N/a | WonderWorks (PBS) | Jim Henson; ABC Afterschool Special (ABC); The Disney Sunday Movie (ABC); Mister Rogers' Neighborhood (PBS); Sesame Street (PBS) |
| 1986–1987 (3rd) | —N/a | Pee-wee's Playhouse (CBS) | —N/a |
| 1987–1988 (4th) | —N/a | Degrassi Junior High (PBS) | Nickelodeon |
| 1988–1989 (5th) | —N/a | The Jim Henson Hour (NBC) | Reading Rainbow (PBS); Sesame Street (PBS); WonderWorks (PBS) |
| 1989–1990 (6th) | —N/a | Jim Henson | Babar (HBO); Degrassi High (PBS); Sesame Street (PBS); WonderWorks (PBS) |
| 1990–1991 (7th) | —N/a | War in the Gulf: Answering Children's Questions (ABC) | Nickelodeon; Dinosaurs (ABC); Pee-wee's Playhouse (CBS); Sesame Street (PBS); Tiny Toon Adventures (Syndicated) |
| 1991–1992 (8th) | —N/a | Peggy Charren, founder of Action for Children’s Television | Linda Ellerbee (Nickelodeon); 3-2-1 Contact Special: What Kids Want to Know About Sex and Growing Up (PBS); Nickelodeon Special Edition: A Conversation with Magic (Nickelodeon); Where in the World Is Carmen Sandiego? (PBS) |
| 1992–1993 (9th) | —N/a | Linda Ellerbee (Nickelodeon) | Beakman's World (The Learning Channel / Syndicated); Mister Rogers' Neighborhood (PBS); Sesame Street (PBS); Where in the World Is Carmen Sandiego? (PBS) |
| 1993–1994 (10th) | —N/a | Linda Ellerbee (Nickelodeon) | Animaniacs (Fox); Beakman's World (The Learning Channel / CBS); Bill Nye the Science Guy (PBS); Sesame Street (PBS); Where in the World Is Carmen Sandiego? (PBS) |
| 1994–1995 (11th) | —N/a | Nick News with Linda Ellerbee (Nickelodeon) | Mister Rogers' Neighborhood (PBS); Rugrats (Nickelodeon); Sesame Street (PBS) |
| 1995–1996 (12th) | —N/a | Wishbone (PBS) | Goosebumps (Fox); Nick News with Linda Ellerbee (Nickelodeon) |
| 1996–1997 (13th) | —N/a | Bill Nye the Science Guy (PBS) and Wishbone (PBS) | Arthur (PBS); The Magic School Bus (PBS); Mister Rogers' Neighborhood (PBS); Rugrats (Nickelodeon) |
| 1997–1998 (14th) | —N/a | Blue's Clues (Nickelodeon) | Nick News with Linda Ellerbee (Nickelodeon); Science Court (ABC); Teletubbies (PBS); Wishbone (PBS) |
| 1998–1999 (15th) | —N/a | Blue's Clues (Nickelodeon) | Arthur (PBS); Bear in the Big Blue House (Disney Channel); Teletubbies (PBS); Wishbone (PBS) |
| 1999–2000 (16th) | —N/a | Between the Lions (PBS) | Arthur (PBS); Bear in the Big Blue House (Disney Channel); Blue's Clues (Nickelodeon); Sesame Street (PBS) |
| 2000–2001 (17th) | —N/a | Between the Lions (PBS) and Sesame Street (PBS) | Blue's Clues (Nickelodeon); Dora the Explorer (Nickelodeon); Rugrats (Nickelodeon) |
| 2001–2002 (18th) | —N/a | SpongeBob SquarePants (Nickelodeon) | Between the Lions (PBS); Little Bill (Nickelodeon); Samurai Jack (Cartoon Network) |
| 2002–2003 (19th) | —N/a | Reading Rainbow (PBS) | Dora the Explorer (Nickelodeon); Liberty's Kids (PBS); Nick News with Linda Ellerbee (Nickelodeon); Sesame Street (PBS) |
| 2003–2004 (20th) | —N/a | Nick News with Linda Ellerbee (Nickelodeon) | Dora the Explorer (Nickelodeon); The Fairly OddParents (Nickelodeon); The Proud Family (Disney Channel); Sesame Street (PBS) |
| 2004–2005 (21st) | —N/a | Degrassi: The Next Generation (The N) | Dora the Explorer (Nickelodeon); Nick News with Linda Ellerbee (Nickelodeon); Postcards from Buster (PBS); SpongeBob SquarePants (Nickelodeon) |
| 2005–2006 (22nd) | —N/a | High School Musical (Disney Channel) | Dora the Explorer (Nickelodeon); Foster's Home for Imaginary Friends (Cartoon Network); Nick News with Linda Ellerbee (Nickelodeon); Sesame Street (PBS) |
| 2006–2007 (23rd) | —N/a | Kyle XY (ABC Family) | Dora the Explorer (Nickelodeon); Johnny and the Sprites (Disney Channel); Lincoln Heights (ABC Family); SpongeBob SquarePants (Nickelodeon) |
| 2007–2008 (24th) | —N/a | WordGirl (PBS) | Curious George (PBS); Hannah Montana (Disney Channel); High School Musical 2 (Disney Channel); Yo Gabba Gabba! (Nickelodeon) |
| 2008–2009 (25th) | —N/a | Yo Gabba Gabba! (Nickelodeon) | Camp Rock (Disney Channel); The Electric Company (PBS); Nick News with Linda Ellerbee (Nickelodeon); Sid the Science Kid (PBS) |
| 2009–2010 (26th) | —N/a | Yo Gabba Gabba! (Nick Jr. Channel) | Dinosaur Train (PBS); iCarly (Nickelodeon); Star Wars: The Clone Wars (Cartoon Network); WordGirl (PBS) |
| 2010–2011 (27th) | —N/a | Sesame Street (PBS) | A Child's Garden of Poetry (HBO); iCarly (Nickelodeon); Nick News with Linda Ellerbee (Nickelodeon); R. L. Stine's The Haunting Hour: The Series (The Hub); Yo Gabba Gabba! (Nick Jr.) |
| 2011–2012 (28th) | —N/a | Switched at Birth (ABC Family) | iCarly (Nickelodeon); Phineas and Ferb (Disney Channel); Sesame Street (PBS); Yo Gabba Gabba! (Nick Jr.) |
| 2012–2013 (29th) | —N/a | Bunheads (ABC Family) | Adventure Time (Cartoon Network); Daniel Tiger's Neighborhood (PBS); Sesame Street (PBS); Switched at Birth (ABC Family) |
| 2013–2014 (30th) | —N/a | The Fosters (ABC Family) | Adventure Time (Cartoon Network); Daniel Tiger's Neighborhood (PBS); Sesame Street (PBS); Switched at Birth (ABC Family) |
| 2014–2015 (31st) | —N/a | The Fosters (ABC Family) | Daniel Tiger's Neighborhood (PBS); The Legend of Korra (Nickelodeon / Nick.com); Sesame Street (PBS); Switched at Birth (ABC Family) |
| 2015–2016 (32nd) | —N/a | Daniel Tiger's Neighborhood (PBS) | Doc McStuffins (Disney Junior); Nature Cat (PBS); Odd Squad (PBS); Sofia the First (Disney Junior) |
| 2016–2017 (33rd) | —N/a | Speechless (ABC) | Daniel Tiger's Neighborhood (PBS); Doc McStuffins (Disney Junior); Elena of Avalor (Disney Channel); Odd Squad (PBS); Sesame Street (HBO) |
| 2017–2018 (34th) | —N/a | Sesame Street (HBO) | Daniel Tiger's Neighborhood (PBS Kids); Elena of Avalor (Disney Channel); Muppet Babies (Disney Junior); Odd Squad (PBS Kids); Sofia the First (Disney Junior) |
| 2018–2019 (35th) | —N/a | Arthur (PBS Kids) | Carmen Sandiego (Netflix); Daniel Tiger's Neighborhood (PBS Kids); Muppet Babies (Disney Junior); Odd Squad (PBS Kids); Sesame Street (HBO) |
| 2019–2020 (36th) | —N/a | Molly of Denali (PBS Kids) | Carmen Sandiego (Netflix); Daniel Tiger's Neighborhood (PBS Kids); Odd Squad (PBS Kids); Wild Kratts (PBS Kids); Xavier Riddle and the Secret Museum (PBS Kids) |
| 2020–2021 (37th) | —N/a | The Baby-Sitters Club (Netflix) | Bluey (Disney Junior); Donkey Hodie (PBS Kids); Emily's Wonder Lab (Netflix); Odd Squad (PBS Kids); Sesame Street (HBO); Waffles + Mochi (Netflix); Xavier Riddle and the Secret Museum (PBS Kids) |
| 2021–2022 (38th) | —N/a | The Baby-Sitters Club (Netflix) | Ada Twist, Scientist (Netflix); El Deafo (Apple TV+); Mira, Royal Detective (Disney Junior); Octonauts: Above & Beyond (Netflix); Odd Squad (PBS Kids); Ridley Jones (Netflix); Sesame Street (HBO Max) |
| 2022–2023 (39th) | Children's Programming | Bluey (Disney+) | Alma's Way (PBS Kids); Daniel Tiger's Neighborhood (PBS Kids); Donkey Hodie (PBS Kids); Eva the Owlet (Apple TV+); Molly of Denali (PBS Kids); Ridley Jones (Netflix); Sesame Street (HBO / Max); Star Wars: Young Jedi Adventures (Disney Junior / Disney+) |
| 2022–2023 (39th) | Family Programming | Ms. Marvel (Disney+) | American Born Chinese (Disney+); High School Musical: The Musical: The Series (Disney+); Jane (Apple TV+); Love, Victor (Hulu); Moon Girl and Devil Dinosaur (Disney Channel); The Mysterious Benedict Society (Disney+); Never Have I Ever (Netflix); Star Trek: Prodigy (Paramount+) |
| 2023–2024 (40th) | Children's Programming | Bluey (Disney+) | Daniel Tiger's Neighborhood (PBS Kids); Frog and Toad (Apple TV+); Pokémon Concierge (Netflix); Sesame Street (HBO / Max); Snoopy Presents: Welcome Home, Franklin (Apple TV+) |
| 2023–2024 (40th) | Family Programming | Doctor Who (Disney+) | Heartstopper (Netflix); My Adventures with Superman (Adult Swim); Percy Jackson and the Olympians (Disney+); Renegade Nell (Disney+); X-Men '97 (Disney+) |
| 2024–2025 (41st) | Children's Programming | Sesame Street (HBO / Max) | Bluey Minisodes (Disney+); Carl the Collector (PBS Kids); Daniel Tiger's Neighborhood (PBS Kids); Donkey Hodie (PBS Kids); Odd Squad (PBS Kids); Win or Lose (Disney+); Wonder Pets: In the City (Apple TV+) |
| 2024–2025 (41st) | Family Programming | Doctor Who (Disney+) | Forever (Netflix); Heartstopper (Netflix); Jentry Chau vs. the Underworld (Netflix); Star Trek: Prodigy (Netflix); Wizards Beyond Waverly Place (Disney Channel); WondLa (Apple TV+); XO, Kitty (Netflix); Your Friendly Neighborhood Spider-Man (Disney+) |
| 2025–2026 (42nd) | Children's Programming | Snoopy Presents: A Summer Musical (Apple TV) | Carl the Collector (PBS Kids); The First Snow of Fraggle Rock (Apple TV); Mickey Mouse Clubhouse+ (Disney+/Disney Jr.); Phoebe & Jay (PBS Kids); Sofia the First: Royal Magic (Disney+/Disney Jr.); Weather Hunters (PBS Kids); The Wonderfully Weird World of Gumball (Hulu) |
| 2025–2026 (42nd) | Family Programming | Percy Jackson and the Olympians (Disney+/Hulu) | Disney Twisted-Wonderland: The Animation (Disney+); Electric Bloom (Disney+/Disney Channel); Phineas and Ferb (Disney+/Disney Channel); Stranger Things: Tales from '85 (Netflix); Vampirina: Teenage Vampire (Disney+/Disney Channel); Wizards Beyond Waverly Place (Disney+/Disney Channel); WondLa (Apple TV) |

== See also ==
- Daytime Emmy Award for Outstanding Children's Animated Program
