= 26th TCA Awards =

US television awards ceremony in 2010

- Date: July 31, 2010
- Venue: Beverly Hilton Hotel

Highlights
- Program of the Year: Glee
- Outstanding New Program: Glee

The 26th TCA Awards were presented by the Television Critics Association. Dax Shepard hosted the ceremony on July 31, 2010, at the Beverly Hilton Hotel.

== Winners and nominees ==
Category	Winner	Other Nominees
Program of the Year	Glee (Fox)	Breaking Bad (AMC); Friday Night Lights (NBC/The 101 Network); Lost (ABC); Modern Family (ABC)
Outstanding Achievement in Comedy	Modern Family (ABC)	The Big Bang Theory (CBS); Glee (Fox); Parks and Recreation (NBC); Party Down (Starz)
Outstanding Achievement in Drama	Breaking Bad (AMC) and Lost (ABC)	The Good Wife (CBS); Mad Men (AMC); Sons of Anarchy (FX)
Outstanding Achievement in Movies, Miniseries and Specials	The Pacific (HBO)	Life (Discovery Channel); Temple Grandin (HBO); Torchwood: Children of Earth (BBC America); You Don't Know Jack (HBO)
Outstanding New Program	Glee (Fox)	The Good Wife (CBS); Justified (FX); Modern Family (ABC); Parenthood (NBC)
Individual Achievement in Comedy	Jane Lynch - Glee (Fox)	Ty Burrell - Modern Family (ABC); Nick Offerman - Parks and Recreation (NBC); Jim Parsons - The Big Bang Theory (CBS); Eric Stonestreet - Modern Family (ABC)
Individual Achievement in Drama	Julianna Margulies - The Good Wife (CBS)	Bryan Cranston - Breaking Bad (AMC); John Lithgow - Dexter (Showtime); Aaron Paul - Breaking Bad (AMC); Katey Sagal - Sons of Anarchy (FX)
Outstanding Achievement in Youth Programming	Yo Gabba Gabba! (Nick Jr. Channel)	Dinosaur Train (PBS); iCarly (Nickelodeon); Star Wars: The Clone Wars (Cartoon Network); WordGirl (PBS)
Outstanding Achievement in News and Information	Life (Discovery Channel)	30 for 30 (ESPN); America: The Story of Us (History); The Daily Show with Jon Stewart (Comedy Central); The Rachel Maddow Show (MSNBC)
Heritage Award	M*A*S*H (CBS)	24 (Fox); Law & Order (NBC); Lost (ABC); Twin Peaks (ABC)
Career Achievement Award	James Garner	Bill Moyers; Sherwood Schwartz; William Shatner; Dick Wolf

=== Multiple wins ===
The following shows received multiple wins:

Wins	Recipient
3	Glee

=== Multiple nominations ===
The following shows received multiple nominations:

Nominations	Recipient
5	Modern Family
4	Breaking Bad
4	Glee
3	The Good Wife
3	Lost
2	The Big Bang Theory
2	Life
2	Parks and Recreation
2	Sons of Anarchy
