= TCA Heritage Award =

Award given by the Television Critics Association

The TCA Heritage Award is an award given by the Television Critics Association.

== Winners and nominees ==
Year	Winner	Other nominees
2001–2002 (18th)	The Simpsons (Fox)	60 Minutes (CBS); Hallmark Hall of Fame (CBS); Law & Order (NBC); Saturday Night Live (NBC)
2002–2003 (19th)	Buffy the Vampire Slayer (The WB / UPN)	60 Minutes (CBS); Law & Order (NBC); Reading Rainbow (PBS); Saturday Night Live (NBC)
2003–2004 (20th)	60 Minutes (CBS)	Frasier (NBC); Friends (NBC); Frontline (PBS); Saturday Night Live (NBC)
2004–2005 (21st)	Nightline (ABC)	Frontline (PBS); M*A*S*H (CBS); Saturday Night Live (NBC); Sesame Street (PBS)
2005–2006 (22nd)	The West Wing (NBC)	Hallmark Hall of Fame (CBS); Will & Grace (NBC)
2006–2007 (23rd)	The Sopranos (HBO)	M*A*S*H (CBS); The Mary Tyler Moore Show (CBS); Roots (ABC); Sesame Street (PBS)
2007–2008 (24th)	The Wire (HBO)	M*A*S*H (CBS); Roots (ABC); Saturday Night Live (NBC); Sesame Street (PBS)
2008–2009 (25th)	ER (NBC)	M*A*S*H (CBS); Saturday Night Live (NBC); The Shield (FX); Star Trek (NBC)
2009–2010 (26th)	M*A*S*H (CBS)	24 (Fox); Law & Order (NBC); Lost (ABC); Twin Peaks (ABC)
2010–2011 (27th)	The Dick Van Dyke Show (CBS)	All in the Family (CBS); Freaks and Geeks (NBC); Twin Peaks (ABC)
2011–2012 (28th)	Cheers (NBC)	Lost (ABC); Saturday Night Live (NBC); Star Trek (NBC); Twin Peaks (ABC)
2012–2013 (29th)	All in the Family (CBS)	Lost (ABC); Saturday Night Live (NBC); Star Trek (NBC); Twin Peaks (ABC)
2013–2014 (30th)	Saturday Night Live (NBC)	Lost (ABC); South Park (Comedy Central); Star Trek (NBC); Twin Peaks (ABC)
2014–2015 (31st)	Late Show / Late Night with David Letterman (CBS / NBC)	Friends (NBC); The Shield (FX); Star Trek (NBC); Twin Peaks (ABC)
2015–2016 (32nd)	The Mary Tyler Moore Show (CBS)	The Larry Sanders Show (HBO); Seinfeld (NBC); Star Trek (NBC); Twin Peaks (ABC)
2016–2017 (33rd)	Seinfeld (NBC)	No other nominees
2017–2018 (34th)	Friends (NBC)	No other nominees
2018–2019 (35th)	Deadwood (HBO)	No other nominees
2019–2020 (36th)	Star Trek (NBC)	No other nominees
2020–2021 (37th)	The Golden Girls (NBC)	No other nominees
2021–2022 (38th)	I Love Lucy (CBS)	No other nominees
2022–2023 (39th)	The Carol Burnett Show (CBS)	No other nominees
2023–2024 (40th)	Twin Peaks (ABC)	No other nominees
2024–2025 (41st)	Sesame Street (NET / PBS / HBO / HBO Max)	No other nominees
2025–2026 (42nd)	In Living Color (Fox)	No other nominees
