= TCA Award for Outstanding Achievement in Movies, Miniseries and Specials =

Annual US television award

The TCA Award for Outstanding Achievement in Movies, Miniseries, and Specials is an award given by the Television Critics Association.

== Winners and nominees ==
Year	Winner	Other Nominees
1984-1985 (1st)	The Burning Bed (NBC)	1984 Summer Olympics – Opening Ceremony (ABC); Farrah Fawcett – The Burning Bed (NBC); Fatal Vision (NBC); Heartsounds (ABC); The Jewel in the Crown (PBS); Kenny & Dolly: A Christmas to Remember (CBS); Threads (PBS); Wallenberg: A Hero's Story (NBC)
1985-1986 (2nd)	Live Aid (ABC / MTV)	Comic Relief (HBO); Horowitz in Moscow (CBS); The Kennedy Center Honors (CBS); Putting It Together: The Making of The Broadway Album (HBO)
1986-1987 (3rd)	Robin Williams: An Evening at the Met (HBO)	n/a
1987-1988 (4th)	Dear America: Letters Home from Vietnam (HBO)	n/a
1988-1989 (5th)	What's Alan Watching? (CBS)	42nd Tony Awards (CBS); Comic Relief III (HBO); Glory! Glory! (HBO)
1989-1990 (6th)	Sammy Davis Jr.'s 60th Anniversary Celebration (ABC)	Billy Crystal; Carmen on Ice (HBO); Comic Relief '90 (HBO); The Kennedy Center Honors (CBS)
1990-1991 (7th)	The Civil War (PBS)	Billy Crystal; The Very Best of the Ed Sullivan Show (CBS)
1991-1992 (8th)	Billy Crystal – 64th Academy Awards (ABC)	MGM: When the Lion Roars (TNT); When It Was a Game (HBO)
1992-1993 (9th)	Fallen Champ: The Untold Story of Mike Tyson (NBC)	Michael Jackson Talks... to Oprah: 90 Primetime Minutes with the King of Pop (ABC); Rowan & Martin's Laugh-In: 25th Anniversary Reunion (NBC); Women of Country (CBS)
1993-1994 (10th)	Prime Suspect III (PBS)	Gypsy (CBS); One for the Road with Charles Kuralt and Morley Safer (CBS); Tales of the City (PBS)
1994-1995 (11th)	Baseball (PBS)	500 Nations (CBS); Barbra: The Concert (HBO); Tales from the Far Side (CBS)
1995-1996 (12th)	Pride and Prejudice (A&E)	68th Academy Awards (ABC); Barbara Walters: 20 Years at ABC (ABC); The Beatles Anthology (ABC)
1996-1997 (13th)	Bastard out of Carolina (Showtime)	The Last Don (CBS); Moll Flanders (PBS); The Odyssey (NBC); The West (PBS)
1997-1998 (14th)	From the Earth to the Moon (HBO)	Don King: Only in America (HBO); Merlin (NBC); Moby Dick (USA); Tom Jones (A&E); What the Deaf Man Heard (CBS)
1998-1999 (15th)	Joan of Arc (CBS)	Alice in Wonderland (NBC); The Farmer's Wife (PBS); Hornblower (A&E); Shot Through the Heart (HBO)
1999-2000 (16th)	The Corner (HBO)	Annie (ABC); Arabian Nights (ABC); Fail Safe (CBS); Jesus (CBS)
2000-2001 (17th)	Life with Judy Garland: Me and My Shadows (ABC)	61* (HBO); Anne Frank (ABC); Horatio Hornblower (A&E); Wit (HBO)
2001-2002 (18th)	Band of Brothers (HBO)	9/11 (CBS); America: A Tribute to Heroes (ABC / CBS / Fox / NBC); The Blue Planet: Seas of Life (Discovery Channel); Frontier House (PBS)
2002-2003 (19th)	Taken (Sci Fi)	Door to Door (TNT); Hitler: The Rise of Evil (CBS); Live from Baghdad (HBO); Manor House (PBS)
2003-2004 (20th)	Angels in America (HBO)	The Lion in Winter (Showtime); Prime Suspect: The Last Witness (PBS); Soldier's Girl (Showtime); State of Play (BBC America)
2004-2005 (21st)	The Office: Christmas Special (BBC America)	Lackawanna Blues (HBO); The Life and Death of Peter Sellers (HBO); Something the Lord Made (HBO); Sometimes in April (HBO)
2005-2006 (22nd)	No Direction Home: Bob Dylan (PBS)	Bleak House (PBS); Elizabeth I (HBO); Sleeper Cell (Showtime); Viva Blackpool (BBC America)
2006-2007 (23rd)	Planet Earth (Discovery Channel)	Broken Trail (AMC); Prime Suspect: The Final Act (PBS); The State Within (BBC America); When the Levees Broke (HBO)
2007-2008 (24th)	John Adams (HBO)	The Complete Jane Austen (PBS); Cranford (PBS); A Raisin in the Sun (ABC); The War (PBS)
2008-2009 (25th)	Grey Gardens (HBO)	2008 Summer Olympics (NBC); 24: Redemption (Fox); Generation Kill (HBO); Taking Chance (HBO)
2009-2010 (26th)	The Pacific (HBO)	Life (Discovery Channel); Temple Grandin (HBO); Torchwood: Children of Earth (BBC America); You Don't Know Jack (HBO)
2010-2011 (27th)	Sherlock (PBS)	Cinema Verite (HBO); Downton Abbey (PBS); Mildred Pierce (HBO); Too Big to Fail (HBO)
2011-2012 (28th)	Downton Abbey (PBS)	Game Change (HBO); Hatfields & McCoys (History); Hemingway & Gellhorn (HBO); Sherlock (PBS)
2012-2013 (29th)	Behind the Candelabra (HBO)	American Horror Story: Asylum (FX); Downton Abbey (PBS); Rectify (Sundance Channel); Top of the Lake (Sundance Channel)
2013-2014 (30th)	True Detective (HBO)	American Horror Story: Coven (FX); Broadchurch (BBC America); Fargo (FX); The Returned (SundanceTV)
2014-2015 (31st)	The Jinx: The Life and Deaths of Robert Durst (HBO)	Bessie (HBO); The Honourable Woman (SundanceTV); Olive Kitteridge (HBO); Wolf Hall (PBS)
2015-2016 (32nd)	The People v. O. J. Simpson: American Crime Story (FX)	All the Way (HBO); Fargo (FX); The Night Manager (AMC); Roots (History); Show Me a Hero (HBO)
2016-2017 (33rd)	Big Little Lies (HBO)	Fargo (FX); Feud: Bette and Joan (FX); Gilmore Girls: A Year in the Life (Netflix); The Night Of (HBO); The Wizard of Lies (HBO)
2017-2018 (34th)	The Assassination of Gianni Versace: American Crime Story (FX)	Alias Grace (Netflix); Howards End (Starz); Patrick Melrose (Showtime); The Tale (HBO); Twin Peaks: The Return (Showtime)
2018-2019 (35th)	Chernobyl (HBO)	Deadwood: The Movie (HBO); Escape at Dannemora (Showtime); Fosse/Verdon (FX); Sharp Objects (HBO); When They See Us (Netflix)
2019-2020 (36th)	Watchmen (HBO)	Little Fires Everywhere (Hulu); Mrs. America (FX on Hulu); Normal People (Hulu); The Plot Against America (HBO); Unbelievable (Netflix)
2020-2021 (37th)	Mare of Easttown (HBO)	Bo Burnham: Inside (Netflix); The Good Lord Bird (Showtime); I May Destroy You (HBO); It's a Sin (HBO Max); The Queen's Gambit (Netflix); The Underground Railroad (Amazon); WandaVision (Disney+)
2021-2022 (38th)	Dopesick (Hulu)	The Dropout (Hulu); The Girl from Plainville (Hulu); Maid (Netflix); Midnight Mass (Netflix); The Staircase (HBO Max); Station Eleven (HBO Max); Under the Banner of Heaven (FX)
2022-2023 (39th)	Beef (Netflix)	Black Bird (Apple TV+); Daisy Jones & The Six (Amazon); Fleishman Is in Trouble (FX); Mrs. Davis (Peacock); The Patient (FX); A Small Light (NatGeo); Weird: The Al Yankovic Story (Roku Channel)
2023-2024 (40th)	Baby Reindeer (Netflix)	The Fall of the House of Usher (Netflix); Fargo (FX); Fellow Travelers (Showtime); Ripley (Netflix); The Sympathizer (HBO / Max)
2024-2025 (41st)	Adolescence (Netflix)	Agatha All Along (Disney+); Disclaimer (Apple TV+); Dying for Sex (FX); The Penguin (HBO); Rebel Ridge (Netflix); Say Nothing (FX); Sirens (Netflix)
2025–2026 (42nd)	Death by Lightning (Netflix)	All Her Fault (Peacock); The Beast in Me (Netflix); Beef (Netflix); DTF St. Louis (HBO Max); Half Man (HBO Max); Lord of the Flies (Netflix); Love Story: John F. Kennedy Jr. & Carolyn Bessette (FX)

== Total awards by network ==
- HBO/Max – 16
- PBS – 6
- ABC – 4
- Netflix – 4
- CBS – 2
- FX – 2
- NBC – 2
- A&E – 1
- BBC America – 1
- Discovery Channel – 1
- Hulu — 1
- MTV – 1
- Sci Fi – 1
- Showtime – 1

== Total nominations by network ==
- HBO/Max – 62
- PBS – 24
- CBS – 20
- Netflix - 19
- FX – 17
- ABC – 15
- NBC – 11
- Showtime – 9
- BBC America – 6
- Hulu - 5
- A&E – 4
- SundanceTV - 4
- Discovery Channel – 3
- Amazon - 2
- AMC - 2
- Apple TV+ - 2
- Disney+ - 2
- Fox - 2
- History - 2
- Peacock - 2
- TNT - 2
- MTV – 1
- NatGeo - 1
- Roku Channel - 1
- Sci Fi – 1
- Starz - 1
