= Cyrus Yavneh =

American television and film producer

- Born: October 14, 1942; New York, New York, U.S.
- Died: January 26, 2018 (aged 75); Santa Monica, California, U.S.
- Education: City College of New York
- Occupations: Television and film producer
- Known for: 24; Supernatural

Cyrus Yavneh (October 14, 1942 – January 26, 2018) was an American television and film producer, most known for his producing role on the Fox action series 24 and The CW series Supernatural.

== Biography ==
Born in New York to a Belarusian Jewish father (Zalman) and an Israeli mother (Anna), Yavneh was an alumnus of City College of New York. He worked as a musician and bottle washer before entering the entertainment business, beginning with an assistant director position on the CBS series Lou Grant.

Yavneh produced 34 episodes of 24, and received a Producers Guild of America Award for Best Episodic Drama as well as a Primetime Emmy Award.

In addition to television, Yavneh produced the 1994 Saturday Night Live spinoff movie It's Pat, as well as Warren Beatty's Town & Country and Arnold Schwarzenegger's directorial debut Christmas in Connecticut. Prior to his death, he was working on the Netflix comedy Insatiable.

Yavneh died of lung cancer on January 26, 2018, in Santa Monica at the age of 75. His funeral was held at Mount Sinai Memorial Park Cemetery.
