= 25th TCA Awards =

US television awards ceremony in 2009

- Date: August 1, 2009
- Venue: Langham Huntington Hotel and Spa, Pasadena, California

Highlights
- Program of the Year: Battlestar Galactica
- Outstanding New Program: True Blood

The 25th TCA Awards were presented by the Television Critics Association. Chelsea Handler hosted the ceremony on August 1, 2009 at the Langham Huntington Hotel and Spa in Pasadena, Calif.

== Winners and nominees ==
Category	Winner	Other Nominees
Program of the Year	Battlestar Galactica (Syfy)	Lost (ABC); Mad Men (AMC); Saturday Night Live (NBC); The Shield (FX)
Outstanding Achievement in Comedy	The Big Bang Theory (CBS)	30 Rock (NBC); The Daily Show with Jon Stewart (Comedy Central); How I Met Your Mother (CBS); The Office (NBC)
Outstanding Achievement in Drama	Mad Men (AMC)	Breaking Bad (AMC); Friday Night Lights (NBC/The 101 Network); Lost (ABC); The Shield (FX)
Outstanding Achievement in Movies, Miniseries and Specials	Grey Gardens (HBO)	2008 Summer Olympics (NBC); 24: Redemption (Fox); Generation Kill (HBO); Taking Chance (HBO)
Outstanding New Program of the Year	True Blood (HBO)	Fringe (Fox); The Mentalist (CBS); The No. 1 Ladies' Detective Agency (HBO); United States of Tara (Showtime)
Individual Achievement in Comedy	Jim Parsons - The Big Bang Theory (CBS)	Alec Baldwin - 30 Rock (NBC); Steve Carell - The Office (NBC); Tina Fey - 30 Rock (NBC); Neil Patrick Harris - How I Met Your Mother (CBS)
Individual Achievement in Drama	Bryan Cranston - Breaking Bad (AMC)	Glenn Close - Damages (FX); Walton Goggins - The Shield (FX); Jon Hamm - Mad Men (AMC); Hugh Laurie - House (Fox)
Outstanding Achievement in Children's Programming	Yo Gabba Gabba! (Nickelodeon)	Camp Rock (Disney Channel); The Electric Company (PBS); Nick News with Linda Ellerbee (Nickelodeon); Sid the Science Kid (PBS)
Outstanding Achievement in News and Information	The Alzheimer's Project (HBO)	60 Minutes (CBS); Frontline (PBS); The Rachel Maddow Show (MSNBC); We Shall Remain (PBS)
Heritage Award	ER (NBC)	M*A*S*H (CBS); Saturday Night Live (NBC); The Shield (FX); Star Trek (NBC)
Career Achievement Award	Betty White	No other nominees

=== Multiple wins ===
The following shows received multiple wins:

Wins	Recipient
2	The Big Bang Theory

=== Multiple nominations ===
The following shows received multiple nominations:

Nominations	Recipient
4	The Shield
3	30 Rock
3	Mad Men
2	The Big Bang Theory
2	Breaking Bad
2	How I Met Your Mother
2	Lost
2	The Office
2	Saturday Night Live
