= 19th TCA Awards =

US television awards ceremony in 2003

- Date: July 19, 2003
- Venue: Renaissance Hollywood Hotel

Highlights
- Program of the Year: American Idol
- Outstanding New Program: Boomtown

The 19th TCA Awards were presented by the Television Critics Association. Wanda Sykes hosted the ceremony on July 19, 2003, at the Renaissance Hollywood Hotel.

== Winners and nominees ==
Category	Winner	Other Nominees
Program of the Year	American Idol (Fox)	24 (Fox); Boomtown (NBC); The Daily Show with Jon Stewart (Comedy Central); The Wire (HBO)
Outstanding Achievement in Comedy	The Daily Show with Jon Stewart (Comedy Central)	Andy Richter Controls the Universe (Fox); Curb Your Enthusiasm (HBO); Everybody Loves Raymond (CBS); The Office (BBC America)
Outstanding Achievement in Drama	Boomtown (NBC)	24 (Fox); The Shield (FX); Six Feet Under (HBO); The Sopranos (HBO); The Wire (HBO)
Outstanding Achievement in Movies, Miniseries and Specials	Taken (Sci Fi)	Door to Door (TNT); Hitler: The Rise of Evil (CBS); Live from Baghdad (HBO); Manor House (PBS)
Outstanding New Program of the Year	Boomtown (NBC)	American Dreams (NBC); Everwood (The WB); Lucky (FX); The Wire (HBO)
Individual Achievement in Comedy	Jon Stewart - The Daily Show with Jon Stewart (Comedy Central)	Larry David - Curb Your Enthusiasm (HBO); Brad Garrett - Everybody Loves Raymond (CBS); Bonnie Hunt - Life with Bonnie (ABC); Tony Shalhoub - Monk (USA)
Individual Achievement in Drama	Edie Falco - The Sopranos (HBO)	James Gandolfini - The Sopranos (HBO); Jennifer Garner - Alias (ABC); Neal McDonough - Boomtown (NBC); Kiefer Sutherland - 24 (Fox)
Outstanding Achievement in Children's Programming	Reading Rainbow (PBS)	Dora the Explorer (Nickelodeon); Liberty's Kids (PBS); Nick News with Linda Ellerbee (Nickelodeon); Sesame Street (PBS)
Outstanding Achievement in News and Information	Frontline (PBS)	David Bloom (NBC); 60 Minutes (CBS); The Daily Show with Jon Stewart (Comedy Central); Nightline (ABC)
Heritage Award	Buffy the Vampire Slayer (The WB/UPN)	60 Minutes (CBS); Law & Order (NBC); Reading Rainbow (PBS); Saturday Night Live (NBC)
Career Achievement Award	Carl Reiner	Larry Gelbart; Don Hewitt; Aaron Spelling; Oprah Winfrey

=== Multiple wins ===
The following shows received multiple wins:

Wins	Recipient
2	Boomtown
2	The Daily Show with Jon Stewart

=== Multiple nominations ===
The following shows received multiple nominations:

Nominations	Recipient
4	Boomtown
4	The Daily Show with Jon Stewart
3	24
3	The Sopranos
3	The Wire
2	60 Minutes
2	Curb Your Enthusiasm
2	Everybody Loves Raymond
2	Reading Rainbow
