= TCA Award for Program of the Year =

Annual US television award

- Awarded for: Best Television Program
- Presented by: Television Critics Association
- First award: 1985
- Currently held by: Heated Rivalry (2026)
- Website: tvcritics.org

The TCA Award for Program of the Year is an award given by the Television Critics Association. It was first presented in 1985 with British television serial The Jewel in the Crown being the first recipient of the award. The category includes both drama and comedy television series as well as limited series.

Only two programs have received the award more than once, HBO's The Sopranos in 1999 and 2001, and AMC's Breaking Bad in 2013 and 2014. HBO's Game of Thrones holds the record of most nominations in the category with seven followed by Hacks, Homicide: Life on the Street, Lost and The Sopranos with five nominations each.

== Winners and nominees ==
Year	Winner	Other Nominees
1984–1985 (1st)	The Jewel in the Crown (PBS)	1984 Summer Olympics (ABC); The Burning Bed (NBC); Cheers (NBC); The Cosby Show (NBC); Fatal Vision (NBC); Miami Vice (NBC); St. Elsewhere (NBC)
1985–1986 (2nd)	Death of a Salesman (CBS) and The Vanishing Family: Crisis in Black America (CBS)	Anne of Green Gables (PBS); The Cosby Show (NBC); An Early Frost (NBC)
1986–1987 (3rd)	Eyes on the Prize (PBS)	Liberty Weekend coverage (ABC); L.A. Law (NBC); Promise (CBS); St. Elsewhere (NBC)
1987–1988 (4th)	Dear America: Letters Home from Vietnam (HBO)	Frank's Place (CBS); L.A. Law (NBC); St. Elsewhere (NBC); The Wonder Years (ABC)
1988–1989 (5th)	Lonesome Dove (CBS)	Murderers Among Us: The Simon Wiesenthal Story (HBO); War and Remembrance (ABC)
1989–1990 (6th)	Twin Peaks (ABC)	Eyes on the Prize II (PBS); L.A. Law (NBC); The Simpsons (Fox)
1990–1991 (7th)	The Civil War (PBS)	Gulf War coverage (CNN); Northern Exposure (CBS)
1991–1992 (8th)	Northern Exposure (CBS)	Brooklyn Bridge (CBS); I'll Fly Away (NBC); The Simpsons (Fox)
1992–1993 (9th)	Barbarians at the Gate (HBO)	Cheers (NBC); Homicide: Life on the Street (NBC); Seinfeld (NBC); The Simpsons (Fox)
1993–1994 (10th)	Late Show with David Letterman (CBS)	1994 Winter Olympics (CBS); The Great Depression (PBS); Gypsy (CBS); NYPD Blue (ABC); Prime Suspect 3 (PBS)
1994–1995 (11th)	ER (NBC)	Baseball (PBS); Homicide: Life on the Street (NBC); My So-Called Life (ABC); The X-Files (Fox)
1995–1996 (12th)	Homicide: Life on the Street (NBC)	ER (NBC); Gulliver's Travels (NBC); Murder One (ABC); NYPD Blue (ABC)
1996–1997 (13th)	EZ Streets (CBS)	Homicide: Life on the Street (NBC); The Odyssey (NBC); Seinfeld (NBC); The X-Files (Fox)
1997–1998 (14th)	From the Earth to the Moon (HBO)	Ally McBeal (Fox); Homicide: Life on the Street (NBC); Nothing Sacred (ABC); South Park (Comedy Central)
1998–1999 (15th)	The Sopranos (HBO)	Everybody Loves Raymond (CBS); The Farmer's Wife (PBS); NYPD Blue (ABC); The Practice (ABC); Sports Night (ABC)
1999–2000 (16th)	The West Wing (NBC)	Buffy the Vampire Slayer (The WB); Sex and the City (HBO); The Sopranos (HBO); Who Wants to Be a Millionaire? (ABC)
2000–2001 (17th)	The Sopranos (HBO)	Buffy the Vampire Slayer (The WB); Gilmore Girls (The WB); Survivor (CBS); The West Wing (NBC)
2001–2002 (18th)	24 (Fox)	Band of Brothers (HBO); The Osbournes (MTV); The Shield (FX); Six Feet Under (HBO)
2002–2003 (19th)	American Idol (Fox)	24 (Fox); Boomtown (NBC); The Daily Show with Jon Stewart (Comedy Central); The Wire (HBO)
2003–2004 (20th)	Angels in America (HBO)	The Apprentice (NBC); Arrested Development (Fox); The Daily Show with Jon Stewart (Comedy Central); The Sopranos (HBO)
2004–2005 (21st)	Desperate Housewives (ABC)	Arrested Development (Fox); The Daily Show with Jon Stewart (Comedy Central); Deadwood (HBO); Lost (ABC)
2005–2006 (22nd)	Grey's Anatomy (ABC)	24 (Fox); Lost (ABC); The Office (NBC); The Sopranos (HBO)
2006–2007 (23rd)	Heroes (NBC)	American Idol (Fox); Friday Night Lights (NBC); Planet Earth (Discovery Channel); When the Levees Broke (HBO); The Wire (HBO)
2007–2008 (24th)	Mad Men (AMC)	John Adams (HBO); Lost (ABC); The War (PBS); The Wire (HBO)
2008–2009 (25th)	Battlestar Galactica (Syfy)	Lost (ABC); Mad Men (AMC); Saturday Night Live (NBC); The Shield (FX)
2009–2010 (26th)	Glee (Fox)	Breaking Bad (AMC); Friday Night Lights (NBC / The 101 Network); Lost (ABC); Modern Family (ABC)
2010–2011 (27th)	Friday Night Lights (NBC / Audience Network)	Boardwalk Empire (HBO); Game of Thrones (HBO); Justified (FX); Parks and Recreation (NBC)
2011–2012 (28th)	Game of Thrones (HBO)	Breaking Bad (AMC); Downton Abbey (PBS); Homeland (Showtime); Mad Men (AMC)
2012–2013 (29th)	Breaking Bad (AMC)	The Americans (FX); Game of Thrones (HBO); House of Cards (Netflix); The Walking Dead (AMC)
2013–2014 (30th)	Breaking Bad (AMC)	Game of Thrones (HBO); The Good Wife (CBS); Orange Is the New Black (Netflix); True Detective (HBO)
2014–2015 (31st)	Empire (Fox)	The Americans (FX); Game of Thrones (HBO); Mad Men (AMC); Transparent (Amazon)
2015–2016 (32nd)	The People v. O. J. Simpson: American Crime Story (FX)	The Americans (FX); Fargo (FX); Game of Thrones (HBO); Making a Murderer (Netflix); Mr. Robot (USA); UnREAL (Lifetime)
2016–2017 (33rd)	The Handmaid's Tale (Hulu)	Atlanta (FX); Big Little Lies (HBO); The Leftovers (HBO); Stranger Things (Netflix); This Is Us (NBC)
2017–2018 (34th)	The Americans (FX)	Atlanta (FX); The Good Place (NBC); The Handmaid's Tale (Hulu); Killing Eve (BBC America); This Is Us (NBC)
2018–2019 (35th)	Fleabag (Amazon)	Chernobyl (HBO); Game of Thrones (HBO); Pose (FX); Russian Doll (Netflix); When They See Us (Netflix)
2019–2020 (36th)	Watchmen (HBO)	Better Call Saul (AMC); Mrs. America (FX); Schitt's Creek (Pop TV); Succession (HBO); Unbelievable (Netflix)
2020–2021 (37th)	Ted Lasso (Apple TV+)	Bridgerton (Netflix); Hacks (HBO Max); I May Destroy You (HBO); Mare of Easttown (HBO); The Queen's Gambit (Netflix); The Underground Railroad (Amazon Prime Video); WandaVision (Disney+)
2021–2022 (38th)	Abbott Elementary (ABC)	Better Call Saul (AMC); Hacks (HBO Max); Severance (Apple TV+); Squid Game (Netflix); Succession (HBO); The White Lotus (HBO); Yellowjackets (Showtime)
2022–2023 (39th)	Succession (HBO)	Abbott Elementary (ABC); Andor (Disney+); The Bear (FX); Better Call Saul (AMC); The Last of Us (HBO); The Other Two (HBO Max); Poker Face (Peacock); The White Lotus (HBO)
2023–2024 (40th)	Shōgun (FX)	Baby Reindeer (Netflix); The Bear (FX); Hacks (HBO / Max); Reservation Dogs (FX); Ripley (Netflix)
2024–2025 (41st)	The Pitt (HBO Max)	Adolescence (Netflix); Andor (Disney+); Hacks (HBO Max); The Rehearsal (HBO); Severance (Apple TV+); The Studio (Apple TV+); The White Lotus (HBO)
2025–2026 (42nd)	Heated Rivalry (Crave/HBO Max)	The Comeback (HBO Max); Hacks (HBO Max); Industry (HBO Max); The Late Show with Stephen Colbert (CBS); The Pitt (HBO Max); Pluribus (Apple TV); Shrinking (Apple TV); Widow's Bay (Apple TV)

== Multiple wins ==
2 wins

- Breaking Bad (consecutive)
- The Sopranos

== Multiple nominees ==
7 nominations

- Game of Thrones

5 nominations

- Hacks
- Homicide: Life on the Street
- Lost
- The Sopranos

4 nominations

- The Americans
- Breaking Bad
- Mad Men

3 nominations

- 24
- Better Call Saul
- The Daily Show with Jon Stewart
- Friday Night Lights
- L.A. Law
- NYPD Blue
- The Simpsons
- St. Elsewhere
- Succession
- The White Lotus
- The Wire

2 nominations

- Abbott Elementary
- American Idol
- Andor
- Arrested Development
- Atlanta
- The Bear
- Buffy the Vampire Slayer
- Cheers
- The Cosby Show
- ER
- The Handmaid's Tale
- Northern Exposure
- The Pitt
- Seinfeld
- Severance
- The Shield
- This Is Us
- The West Wing
- The X-Files

== Total awards by network ==
- HBO/Max – 11
- CBS – 6
- NBC – 5
- ABC – 4
- Fox – 4
- AMC – 3
- FX – 3
- PBS – 3
- Amazon – 1
- Apple TV+ – 1
- Audience Network – 1
- Crave – 1
- Hulu – 1
- Syfy – 1

== Total nominations by network ==
- HBO/Max – 53
- NBC – 40
- ABC – 24
- FX – 17
- CBS – 16
- Fox – 15
- AMC – 12
- PBS – 11
- Apple TV – 7
- Amazon Prime Video – 3
- The WB – 3
- The 101 Network/Audience Network – 2
- Hulu – 2
- Crave – 1
- Discovery Channel – 1
- Syfy – 1

== See also ==
- Primetime Emmy Awards
