= 21st TCA Awards =

US television awards ceremony in 2005

- Date: July 23, 2005
- Venue: Beverly Hilton Hotel

Highlights
- Program of the Year: Desperate Housewives
- Outstanding New Program: Lost

The 21st TCA Awards were presented by the Television Critics Association. Craig Ferguson hosted the ceremony on July 23, 2005, at the Beverly Hilton Hotel.

== Winners and nominees ==
Category	Winner	Other Nominees
Program of the Year	Desperate Housewives (ABC)	Arrested Development (Fox); The Daily Show with Jon Stewart (Comedy Central); Deadwood (HBO); Lost (ABC)
Outstanding Achievement in Comedy	Arrested Development (Fox)	The Daily Show with Jon Stewart (Comedy Central); Desperate Housewives (ABC); Everybody Loves Raymond (CBS); Gilmore Girls (The WB)
Outstanding Achievement in Drama	Lost (ABC)	24 (Fox); Deadwood (HBO); House (Fox); Rescue Me (FX)
Outstanding Achievement in Movies, Miniseries and Specials	The Office Special (BBC America)	Lackawanna Blues (HBO); The Life and Death of Peter Sellers (HBO); Something the Lord Made (HBO); Sometimes in April (HBO)
Outstanding New Program of the Year	Lost (ABC)	Desperate Housewives (ABC); House (Fox); Rescue Me (FX); Veronica Mars (UPN)
Individual Achievement in Comedy	Jon Stewart - The Daily Show with Jon Stewart (Comedy Central)	Jason Bateman - Arrested Development (Fox); Marcia Cross - Desperate Housewives (ABC); Teri Hatcher - Desperate Housewives (ABC); Ray Romano - Everybody Loves Raymond (CBS)
Individual Achievement in Drama	Hugh Laurie - House (Fox)	Kristen Bell - Veronica Mars (UPN); Matthew Fox - Lost (ABC); Ian McShane - Deadwood (HBO); Kiefer Sutherland - 24 (Fox)
Outstanding Achievement in Children's Programming	Degrassi: The Next Generation (The N)	Dora the Explorer (Nickelodeon); Nick News with Linda Ellerbee (Nickelodeon); Postcards from Buster (PBS); SpongeBob SquarePants (Nickelodeon)
Outstanding Achievement in News and Information	Frontline (PBS)	60 Minutes: Sunday Edition (CBS); The Daily Show with Jon Stewart (Comedy Central); Meet the Press (NBC); The News Hour with Jim Lehrer (PBS); Nightline (ABC)
Heritage Award	Nightline (ABC)	Frontline (PBS); M*A*S*H (CBS); Saturday Night Live (NBC); Sesame Street (PBS)
Career Achievement Award	Bob Newhart	No other nominees

=== Multiple wins ===
The following shows received multiple wins:

Wins	Recipient
2	Lost

=== Multiple nominations ===
The following shows received multiple nominations:

Nominations	Recipient
5	Desperate Housewives
4	The Daily Show with Jon Stewart
4	Lost
3	Arrested Development
3	Deadwood
3	House
2	24
2	Everybody Loves Raymond
2	Frontline
2	Nightline
2	Rescue Me
2	Veronica Mars
