= TCA Award for Individual Achievement in Comedy =

Annual US television award

The TCA Award for Individual Achievement in Comedy is an award given by the Television Critics Association.

== Winners and nominees ==
Year	Winner	Program	Other nominees
1996–1997 (13th)	David Hyde Pierce	Frasier (NBC)	Drew Carey – The Drew Carey Show (ABC); Kelsey Grammer – Frasier (NBC); John Lithgow – 3rd Rock from the Sun (NBC); Rip Torn – The Larry Sanders Show (HBO)
1997–1998 (14th)	David Hyde Pierce	Frasier (NBC)	Jenna Elfman – Dharma & Greg (ABC); Calista Flockhart – Ally McBeal (Fox); Michael Richards – Seinfeld (NBC); Jerry Seinfeld – Seinfeld (NBC)
1998–1999 (15th)	Ray Romano	Everybody Loves Raymond (CBS)	Calista Flockhart – Ally McBeal (Fox); Kelsey Grammer – Frasier (NBC); Matt Groening – Futurama & The Simpsons (Fox); Sean Hayes – Will & Grace (NBC); Megan Mullally – Will & Grace (NBC)
1999–2000 (16th)	Jane Kaczmarek	Malcolm in the Middle (Fox)	Sean Hayes – Will & Grace (NBC); Megan Mullally – Will & Grace (NBC); Frankie Muniz – Malcolm in the Middle (Fox); Ray Romano – Everybody Loves Raymond (CBS)
2000–2001 (17th)	Jane Kaczmarek	Malcolm in the Middle (Fox)	Bryan Cranston – Malcolm in the Middle (Fox); Robert Downey Jr. – Ally McBeal (Fox); Chris Isaak – The Chris Isaak Show (Showtime); Ray Romano – Everybody Loves Raymond (CBS)
2001–2002 (18th)	Bernie Mac	The Bernie Mac Show (Fox)	Denis Leary – The Job (ABC); Matt LeBlanc – Friends (NBC); John C. McGinley – Scrubs (NBC); Ray Romano – Everybody Loves Raymond (CBS)
2002–2003 (19th)	Jon Stewart	The Daily Show with Jon Stewart (Comedy Central)	Larry David – Curb Your Enthusiasm (HBO); Brad Garrett – Everybody Loves Raymond (CBS); Bonnie Hunt – Life with Bonnie (ABC); Tony Shalhoub – Monk (USA)
2003–2004 (20th)	Ricky Gervais	The Office (BBC America)	Jason Bateman – Arrested Development (Fox); Larry David – Curb Your Enthusiasm (HBO); Jon Stewart – The Daily Show with Jon Stewart (Comedy Central); Jeffrey Tambor – Arrested Development (Fox)
2004–2005 (21st)	Jon Stewart	The Daily Show with Jon Stewart (Comedy Central)	Jason Bateman – Arrested Development (Fox); Marcia Cross – Desperate Housewives (ABC); Teri Hatcher – Desperate Housewives (ABC); Ray Romano – Everybody Loves Raymond (CBS)
2005–2006 (22nd)	Steve Carell	The Office (NBC)	Stephen Colbert – The Colbert Report (Comedy Central); Lauren Graham – Gilmore Girls (The WB); Jason Lee – My Name Is Earl (NBC); Jon Stewart – The Daily Show with Jon Stewart (Comedy Central)
2006–2007 (23rd)	Alec Baldwin	30 Rock (NBC)	Stephen Colbert – The Colbert Report (Comedy Central); America Ferrera – Ugly Betty (ABC); Tina Fey – 30 Rock (NBC); Jon Stewart – The Daily Show with Jon Stewart (Comedy Central)
2007–2008 (24th)	Tina Fey	30 Rock (NBC)	Christina Applegate – Samantha Who? (ABC); Alec Baldwin – 30 Rock (NBC); Stephen Colbert – The Colbert Report (Comedy Central); Ray Wise – Reaper (The CW)
2008–2009 (25th)	Jim Parsons	The Big Bang Theory (CBS)	Alec Baldwin – 30 Rock (NBC); Steve Carell – The Office (NBC); Tina Fey – 30 Rock (NBC); Neil Patrick Harris – How I Met Your Mother (CBS)
2009–2010 (26th)	Jane Lynch	Glee (Fox)	Ty Burrell – Modern Family (ABC); Nick Offerman – Parks and Recreation (NBC); Jim Parsons – The Big Bang Theory (CBS); Eric Stonestreet – Modern Family (ABC)
2010–2011 (27th)	Ty Burrell and Nick Offerman	Modern Family (ABC) Parks and Recreation (NBC)	Louis C.K. – Louie (FX); Amy Poehler – Parks and Recreation (NBC); Danny Pudi – Community (NBC); Jon Stewart – The Daily Show with Jon Stewart (Comedy Central)
2011–2012 (28th)	Louis C.K.	Louie (FX)	Lena Dunham – Girls (HBO); Julia Louis-Dreyfus – Veep (HBO); Jim Parsons – The Big Bang Theory (CBS); Amy Poehler – Parks and Recreation (NBC)
2012–2013 (29th)	Louis C.K.	Louie (FX)	Lena Dunham – Girls (HBO); Jake Johnson – New Girl (Fox); Julia Louis-Dreyfus – Veep (HBO); Amy Poehler – Parks and Recreation (NBC)
2013–2014 (30th)	Julia Louis-Dreyfus	Veep (HBO)	Louis C.K. – Louie (FX); Mindy Kaling – The Mindy Project (Fox); Jim Parsons – The Big Bang Theory (CBS); Amy Poehler – Parks and Recreation (NBC)
2014–2015 (31st)	Amy Schumer	Inside Amy Schumer (Comedy Central)	Julia Louis-Dreyfus – Veep (HBO); Gina Rodriguez – Jane the Virgin (The CW); Jeffrey Tambor – Transparent (Amazon); Constance Wu – Fresh Off the Boat (ABC)
2015–2016 (32nd)	Rachel Bloom	Crazy Ex-Girlfriend (The CW)	Aziz Ansari – Master of None (Netflix); Samantha Bee – Full Frontal with Samantha Bee (TBS); Aya Cash – You're the Worst (FXX); Julia Louis-Dreyfus – Veep (HBO); Constance Wu – Fresh Off the Boat (ABC)
2016–2017 (33rd)	Donald Glover	Atlanta (FX)	Pamela Adlon – Better Things (FX); Aziz Ansari – Master of None (Netflix); Kristen Bell – The Good Place (NBC); Julia Louis-Dreyfus – Veep (HBO); Issa Rae – Insecure (HBO); Phoebe Waller-Bridge – Fleabag (Amazon)
2017–2018 (34th)	Rachel Brosnahan	The Marvelous Mrs. Maisel (Amazon)	Pamela Adlon – Better Things (FX); Rachel Bloom – Crazy Ex-Girlfriend (The CW); Ted Danson – The Good Place (NBC); Donald Glover – Atlanta (FX); Bill Hader – Barry (HBO)
2018–2019 (35th)	Phoebe Waller-Bridge	Fleabag (Amazon)	Pamela Adlon – Better Things (FX); Bill Hader – Barry (HBO); Julia Louis-Dreyfus – Veep (HBO); Natasha Lyonne – Russian Doll (Netflix); Catherine O'Hara – Schitt's Creek (Pop)
2019–2020 (36th)	Catherine O'Hara	Schitt's Creek (Pop)	Pamela Adlon – Better Things (FX); Christina Applegate – Dead to Me (Netflix); Elle Fanning – The Great (Hulu); Issa Rae – Insecure (HBO); Ramy Youssef – Ramy (Hulu)
2020–2021 (37th)	Jean Smart	Hacks (HBO Max)	Bo Burnham – Bo Burnham: Inside (Netflix); Kaley Cuoco – The Flight Attendant (HBO Max); Maya Erskine – PEN15 (Hulu); Renée Elise Goldsberry – Girls5eva (Peacock); Charlotte Nicdao – Mythic Quest (Apple TV+); Jason Sudeikis – Ted Lasso (Apple TV+); Hannah Waddingham – Ted Lasso (Apple TV+)
2021–2022 (38th)	Quinta Brunson	Abbott Elementary (ABC)	Pamela Adlon – Better Things (FX); Bridget Everett – Somebody Somewhere (HBO); Bill Hader – Barry (HBO); Janelle James – Abbott Elementary (ABC); Steve Martin – Only Murders in the Building (Hulu); Jean Smart – Hacks (HBO Max); Jason Sudeikis – Ted Lasso (Apple TV+)
2022–2023 (39th)	Natasha Lyonne	Poker Face (Peacock)	Quinta Brunson – Abbott Elementary (ABC); Ayo Edebiri – The Bear (FX); Harrison Ford – Shrinking (Apple TV+); Bill Hader – Barry (HBO); Janelle James – Abbott Elementary (ABC); James Marsden – Jury Duty (Amazon Freevee); Jeremy Allen White – The Bear (FX)
2023–2024 (40th)	Jean Smart	Hacks (HBO / Max)	Quinta Brunson – Abbott Elementary (ABC); Ayo Edebiri – The Bear (FX); Renée Elise Goldsberry – Girls5eva (Netflix); Devery Jacobs – Reservation Dogs (FX); Jeremy Allen White – The Bear (FX)
2024–2025 (41st)	Bridget Everett	Somebody Somewhere (HBO)	Liza Colón-Zayas – The Bear (FX); Hannah Einbinder – Hacks (HBO Max); Nathan Fielder – The Rehearsal (HBO); Harrison Ford – Shrinking (Apple TV+); Janelle James – Abbott Elementary (ABC); Seth Rogen – The Studio (Apple TV+); Jean Smart – Hacks (HBO Max); Michelle Williams – Dying for Sex (FX)
2025–2026 (42nd)	Kate O'Flynn	Widow's Bay (Apple TV)	Hannah Einbinder — Hacks (HBO Max); Elle Fanning — Margo's Got Money Troubles (Apple TV); Harrison Ford – Shrinking (Apple TV); Lisa Kudrow – The Comeback (HBO Max); Matthew Rhys – Widow's Bay (Apple TV); Jean Smart — Hacks (HBO Max); Tim Robinson — The Chair Company (HBO Max)

== Multiple wins ==
2 wins

- Louis C.K. (consecutive)
- Jane Kaczmarek (consecutive)
- David Hyde Pierce (consecutive)
- Jean Smart
- Jon Stewart

== Multiple nominees ==
7 nominations

- Julia Louis-Dreyfus

6 nominations

- Jon Stewart

5 nominations

- Pamela Adlon
- Ray Romano
- Jean Smart

4 nominations

- Louis C.K.
- Bill Hader
- Jim Parsons
- Amy Poehler

3 nominations

- Alec Baldwin
- Quinta Brunson
- Stephen Colbert
- Tina Fey
- Harrison Ford
- Janelle James

2 nominations

- Aziz Ansari
- Christina Applegate
- Jason Bateman
- Rachel Bloom
- Ty Burrell
- Steve Carell
- Larry David
- Lena Dunham
- Ayo Edebiri
- Hannah Einbinder
- Bridget Everett
- Elle Fanning
- Calista Flockhart
- Donald Glover
- Renee Elise Goldsberry
- Kelsey Grammer
- Sean Hayes
- David Hyde Pierce
- Jane Kaczmarek
- Natasha Lyonne
- Megan Mullally
- Nick Offerman
- Catherine O'Hara
- Issa Rae
- Jason Sudeikis
- Jeffrey Tambor
- Phoebe Waller-Bridge
- Jeremy Allen White
- Constance Wu
