= TCA Award for Outstanding Achievement in Drama =

Annual US television award

The TCA Award for Outstanding Achievement in Drama is an award given by the Television Critics Association.

== Winners and nominees ==
Year	Winner	Other Nominees
1984-1985 (1st)	The Jewel in the Crown (PBS)	Farrah Fawcett – The Burning Bed (NBC); American Playhouse (PBS); The Burning Bed (NBC); Cagney & Lacey (CBS); Call to Glory (ABC); Fatal Vision (NBC); Hill Street Blues (NBC); Miami Vice (NBC); St. Elsewhere (NBC)
1985-1986 (2nd)	Death of a Salesman (CBS)	Anne of Green Gables (PBS); An Early Frost (NBC); Love Is Never Silent (NBC); Nobody's Child (CBS); St. Elsewhere (NBC)
1986-1987 (3rd)	L.A. Law (NBC)	St. Elsewhere (NBC)
1987-1988 (4th)	St. Elsewhere (NBC)	L.A. Law (NBC); thirtysomething (ABC)
1988-1989 (5th)	Lonesome Dove (CBS)	China Beach (ABC); L.A. Law (NBC); thirtysomething (ABC); War and Remembrance (ABC)
1989-1990 (6th)	Twin Peaks (ABC)	The Final Days (ABC); L.A. Law (NBC); Shannon's Deal (NBC); thirtysomething (ABC)
1990-1991 (7th)	thirtysomething (ABC)	The Civil War (PBS); Law & Order (NBC); Northern Exposure (CBS); Separate but Equal (ABC)
1991-1992 (8th)	I'll Fly Away (NBC)	Civil Wars (ABC); Homefront (ABC); Law & Order (NBC); Northern Exposure (CBS)
1992-1993 (9th)	I'll Fly Away (NBC)	Barbarians at the Gate (HBO); Homefront (ABC); Homicide: Life on the Street (NBC); Law & Order (NBC); Prime Suspect 2 (PBS)
1993-1994 (10th)	NYPD Blue (ABC)	Homicide: Life on the Street (NBC); Law & Order (NBC); Prime Suspect 3 (PBS); The X-Files (Fox)
1994-1995 (11th)	My So-Called Life (ABC)	ER (NBC); Homicide: Life on the Street (NBC); NYPD Blue (ABC); The X-Files (Fox)
1995-1996 (12th)	Homicide: Life on the Street (NBC)	ER (NBC); Murder One (ABC); NYPD Blue (ABC); The X-Files (Fox)
1996-1997 (13th)	Homicide: Life on the Street (NBC)	EZ Streets (CBS); Law & Order (NBC); NYPD Blue (ABC); The X-Files (Fox)
1997-1998 (14th)	Homicide: Life on the Street (NBC)	ER (NBC); Law & Order (NBC); The Practice (ABC); The X-Files (Fox)
1998-1999 (15th)	The Sopranos (HBO)	Homicide: Life on the Street (NBC); Law & Order (NBC); NYPD Blue (ABC); The Practice (ABC)
1999-2000 (16th)	The West Wing (NBC)	Buffy the Vampire Slayer (The WB); Freaks and Geeks (NBC); Once and Again (ABC); The Practice (ABC); The Sopranos (HBO)
2000-2001 (17th)	The Sopranos (HBO) and The West Wing (NBC)	Buffy the Vampire Slayer (The WB); CSI: Crime Scene Investigation (CBS); Gilmore Girls (The WB)
2001-2002 (18th)	Six Feet Under (HBO)	24 (Fox); CSI: Crime Scene Investigation (CBS); Gilmore Girls (The WB); The Shield (FX)
2002-2003 (19th)	Boomtown (NBC)	24 (Fox); The Shield (FX); Six Feet Under (HBO); The Sopranos (HBO); The Wire (HBO)
2003-2004 (20th)	The Sopranos (HBO)	24 (Fox); Deadwood (HBO); The Shield (FX); The Wire (HBO)
2004-2005 (21st)	Lost (ABC)	24 (Fox); Deadwood (HBO); House (Fox); Rescue Me (FX)
2005-2006 (22nd)	Lost (ABC)	24 (Fox); Grey's Anatomy (ABC); House (Fox); The Sopranos (HBO)
2006-2007 (23rd)	The Sopranos (HBO)	Friday Night Lights (NBC); Heroes (NBC); Lost (ABC); The Wire (HBO)
2007-2008 (24th)	Mad Men (AMC)	Damages (FX); Friday Night Lights (NBC); Lost (ABC); The Wire (HBO)
2008-2009 (25th)	Mad Men (AMC)	Breaking Bad (AMC); Friday Night Lights (The 101 Network / NBC); Lost (ABC); The Shield (FX)
2009-2010 (26th)	Breaking Bad (AMC) and Lost (ABC)	The Good Wife (CBS); Mad Men (AMC); Sons of Anarchy (FX)
2010-2011 (27th)	Mad Men (AMC)	Friday Night Lights (The 101 Network / NBC); Game of Thrones (HBO); The Good Wife (CBS); Justified (FX)
2011-2012 (28th)	Breaking Bad (AMC)	Game of Thrones (HBO); Homeland (Showtime); Justified (FX); Mad Men (AMC)
2012-2013 (29th)	Game of Thrones (HBO)	The Americans (FX); Breaking Bad (AMC); Homeland (Showtime); Mad Men (AMC)
2013-2014 (30th)	The Good Wife (CBS)	The Americans (FX); Breaking Bad (AMC); Game of Thrones (HBO); House of Cards (Netflix)
2014-2015 (31st)	The Americans (FX)	Empire (Fox); Game of Thrones (HBO); Justified (FX); Mad Men (AMC)
2015-2016 (32nd)	The Americans (FX)	Better Call Saul (AMC); Game of Thrones (HBO); The Leftovers (HBO); Mr. Robot (USA); UnREAL (Lifetime)
2016-2017 (33rd)	The Handmaid's Tale (Hulu)	The Americans (FX); Better Call Saul (AMC); The Crown (Netflix); Stranger Things (Netflix); This Is Us (NBC)
2017-2018 (34th)	The Americans (FX)	The Crown (Netflix); The Good Fight (CBS All Access); The Handmaid's Tale (Hulu); Killing Eve (BBC America); This Is Us (NBC)
2018-2019 (35th)	Better Call Saul (AMC)	The Good Fight (CBS All Access); Homecoming (Amazon); Killing Eve (BBC America); Pose (FX); Succession (HBO)
2019-2020 (36th)	Succession (HBO)	Better Call Saul (AMC); The Crown (Netflix); Euphoria (HBO); The Good Fight (CBS All Access); Pose (FX)
2020-2021 (37th)	The Crown (Netflix)	Bridgerton (Netflix); For All Mankind (Apple TV+); The Handmaid's Tale (Hulu); Lovecraft Country (HBO); The Mandalorian (Disney+); Pose (FX); P-Valley (Starz)
2021-2022 (38th)	Succession (HBO)	Better Call Saul (AMC); The Good Fight (Paramount+); Pachinko (Apple TV+); Severance (Apple TV+); Squid Game (Netflix); This Is Us (NBC); Yellowjackets (Showtime)
2022-2023 (39th)	Succession (HBO)	Andor (Disney+); Better Call Saul (AMC); The Good Fight (Paramount+); Interview with the Vampire (AMC); The Last of Us (HBO); The White Lotus (HBO); Yellowjackets (Showtime)
2023-2024 (40th)	Shōgun (FX)	Baby Reindeer (Netflix); Fallout (Amazon); Fargo (FX); Ripley (Netflix); True Detective: Night Country (HBO / Max)
2024-2025 (41st)	The Pitt (HBO Max)	Andor (Disney+); Industry (HBO); Interview with the Vampire (AMC); The Last of Us (HBO); Matlock (CBS); Severance (Apple TV+); The White Lotus (HBO)
2025-2026 (42nd)	The Pitt (HBO Max)	Heated Rivalry (Crave / HBO Max); Industry (HBO); Interview with the Vampire (AMC); The Lowdown (FX); Matlock (CBS); Pluribus (Apple TV); Task (HBO)

== Multiple wins ==
4 wins

- The Sopranos

3 wins

- The Americans (2 consecutive)
- Homicide: Life on the Street (consecutive)
- Lost (2 consecutive)
- Mad Men (2 consecutive)
- Succession (2 consecutive)

2 wins

- Breaking Bad
- I'll Fly Away (consecutive)
- The Pitt (consecutive)
- The West Wing (consecutive)

== Multiple nominees ==
7 nominations

- Homicide: Life on the Street
- Law & Order
- Mad Men
- The Sopranos

6 nominations

- The Americans
- Better Call Saul
- Game of Thrones
- Lost

5 nominations

- 24
- Breaking Bad
- The Good Fight
- NYPD Blue
- The X-Files

4 nominations

- The Crown
- Friday Night Lights
- L.A. Law
- The Shield
- St. Elsewhere
- Succession
- thirtysomething
- The Wire

3 nominations

- ER
- The Good Wife
- The Handmaid's Tale
- Interview with the Vampire
- Justified
- Pose
- The Practice
- This Is Us

2 nominations

- Andor
- Buffy the Vampire Slayer
- CSI: Crime Scene Investigation
- Deadwood
- Gilmore Girls
- Homefront
- Homeland
- House
- I'll Fly Away
- Industry
- Killing Eve
- The Last of Us
- Matlock
- Northern Exposure
- The Pitt
- Severance
- Six Feet Under
- The West Wing
- The White Lotus
- Yellowjackets

== Total awards by network ==
- HBO/Max – 11
- NBC – 10
- ABC – 7
- AMC – 6
- FX – 4
- CBS – 3
- Hulu – 1
- Netflix - 1
- PBS – 1

== Total nominations by network ==
- NBC – 47
- HBO/Max – 40
- ABC – 31
- FX – 22
- AMC – 21
- CBS – 14
- Fox - 13
- Netflix - 10
- PBS – 6
- Apple TV - 5
- Showtime - 4
- The WB - 4
- CBS All Access - 3
- Hulu – 3
- Amazon - 2
- BBC America - 2
- Disney+ - 3
- Paramount+ - 2
- The 101 Network - 2
- Lifetime - 1
- Starz - 1
- USA - 1
