= TCA Award for Outstanding Achievement in Comedy =

Television award

The TCA Award for Outstanding Achievement in Comedy is an award given by the Television Critics Association.

== Winners and nominees ==
Year	Winner	Other Nominees
1984-1985 (1st)	The Cosby Show (NBC)	Bill Cosby – The Cosby Show (NBC); Martin Short – Saturday Night Live (NBC); Brothers (Showtime); Cheers (NBC); Family Ties (NBC); Kate & Allie (CBS); Late Night with David Letterman (NBC); Newhart (CBS); Night Court (NBC); Not Necessarily the News (HBO)
1985-1986 (2nd)	The Cosby Show (NBC)	Cheers (NBC); The Golden Girls (NBC); Moonlighting (ABC); Newhart (CBS)
1986-1987 (3rd)	It's Garry Shandling's Show (Showtime)	n/a
1987-1988 (4th)	Frank's Place (NBC) and The Wonder Years (ABC)	n/a
1988-1989 (5th)	Murphy Brown (CBS)	Roseanne (ABC); The Wonder Years (ABC)
1989-1990 (6th)	The Simpsons (Fox)	Designing Women (CBS); Murphy Brown (CBS); Newhart (CBS); The Wonder Years (ABC)
1990-1991 (7th)	Murphy Brown (CBS)	Cheers (NBC); Northern Exposure (CBS); The Simpsons (Fox)
1991-1992 (8th)	Seinfeld (NBC)	Brooklyn Bridge (CBS); Murphy Brown (CBS); Northern Exposure (CBS); The Simpsons (Fox)
1992-1993 (9th)	Seinfeld (NBC)	Cheers (NBC); The Larry Sanders Show (HBO); Roseanne (ABC); The Simpsons (Fox)
1993-1994 (10th)	Frasier (NBC)	The Larry Sanders Show (HBO); Late Show with David Letterman (CBS); Seinfeld (NBC); The Simpsons (Fox)
1994-1995 (11th)	Frasier (NBC)	Friends (NBC); The Larry Sanders Show (HBO); Mad About You (NBC); Seinfeld (NBC)
1995-1996 (12th)	Frasier (NBC)	3rd Rock from the Sun (NBC); The Larry Sanders Show (HBO); Seinfeld (NBC); The Simpsons (Fox)
1996-1997 (13th)	The Larry Sanders Show (HBO)	3rd Rock from the Sun (NBC); Frasier (NBC); King of the Hill (Fox); Seinfeld (NBC)
1997-1998 (14th)	The Larry Sanders Show (HBO)	Ally McBeal (Fox); Everybody Loves Raymond (CBS); Frasier (NBC); Seinfeld (NBC)
1998-1999 (15th)	Sports Night (ABC)	Ally McBeal (Fox); Everybody Loves Raymond (CBS); Friends (NBC); Will & Grace (NBC)
1999-2000 (16th)	Malcolm in the Middle (Fox)	Everybody Loves Raymond (CBS); Frasier (NBC); Sex and the City (HBO); Will & Grace (NBC)
2000-2001 (17th)	Malcolm in the Middle (Fox)	Ed (NBC); Everybody Loves Raymond (CBS); The Job (ABC); Sex and the City (HBO)
2001-2002 (18th)	The Bernie Mac Show (Fox)	Everybody Loves Raymond (CBS); Friends (NBC); The Osbournes (MTV); Scrubs (NBC)
2002-2003 (19th)	The Daily Show with Jon Stewart (Comedy Central)	Andy Richter Controls the Universe (Fox); Curb Your Enthusiasm (HBO); Everybody Loves Raymond (CBS); The Office (BBC America)
2003-2004 (20th)	Arrested Development (Fox)	Curb Your Enthusiasm (HBO); The Daily Show with Jon Stewart (Comedy Central); The Office (BBC America); Sex and the City (HBO)
2004-2005 (21st)	Arrested Development (Fox)	The Daily Show with Jon Stewart (Comedy Central); Desperate Housewives (ABC); Everybody Loves Raymond (CBS); Gilmore Girls (The WB)
2005-2006 (22nd)	The Office (NBC)	The Daily Show with Jon Stewart (Comedy Central); Everybody Hates Chris (UPN); My Name Is Earl (NBC); Scrubs (NBC)
2006-2007 (23rd)	The Office (NBC)	30 Rock (NBC); The Daily Show with Jon Stewart (Comedy Central); Entourage (HBO); Ugly Betty (ABC)
2007-2008 (24th)	30 Rock (NBC)	The Colbert Report (Comedy Central); The Daily Show with Jon Stewart (Comedy Central); Flight of the Conchords (HBO); The Office (NBC)
2008-2009 (25th)	The Big Bang Theory (CBS)	30 Rock (NBC); The Daily Show with Jon Stewart (Comedy Central); How I Met Your Mother (CBS); The Office (NBC)
2009-2010 (26th)	Modern Family (ABC)	The Big Bang Theory (CBS); Glee (Fox); Parks and Recreation (NBC); Party Down (Starz)
2010-2011 (27th)	Modern Family (ABC)	Community (NBC); Louie (FX); Parks and Recreation (NBC); Raising Hope (Fox)
2011-2012 (28th)	Louie (FX)	The Big Bang Theory (CBS); Community (NBC); Modern Family (ABC); Parks and Recreation (NBC)
2012-2013 (29th)	The Big Bang Theory (CBS) and Parks and Recreation (NBC)	Louie (FX); New Girl (Fox); Veep (HBO)
2013-2014 (30th)	Louie (FX) and Veep (HBO)	The Big Bang Theory (CBS); Brooklyn Nine-Nine (Fox); The Mindy Project (Fox)
2014-2015 (31st)	Inside Amy Schumer (Comedy Central)	The Big Bang Theory (CBS); Jane the Virgin (The CW); Transparent (Amazon); Unbreakable Kimmy Schmidt (Netflix)
2015-2016 (32nd)	Black-ish (ABC)	Crazy Ex-Girlfriend (The CW); Master of None (Netflix); Silicon Valley (HBO); Veep (HBO); You're the Worst (FXX)
2016-2017 (33rd)	Atlanta (FX)	Black-ish (ABC); Fleabag (Amazon); The Good Place (NBC); Master of None (Netflix); Veep (HBO)
2017-2018 (34th)	The Good Place (NBC)	Atlanta (FX); Barry (HBO); GLOW (Netflix); The Marvelous Mrs. Maisel (Amazon); One Day at a Time (Netflix)
2018-2019 (35th)	Fleabag (Amazon)	Barry (HBO); The Good Place (NBC); The Marvelous Mrs. Maisel (Amazon); Russian Doll (Netflix); Schitt's Creek (Pop); Veep (HBO)
2019-2020 (36th)	Schitt's Creek (Pop)	Better Things (FX); Dead to Me (Netflix); The Good Place (NBC); Insecure (HBO); What We Do in the Shadows (FX)
2020-2021 (37th)	Ted Lasso (Apple TV+)	The Flight Attendant (HBO Max); Girls5eva (Peacock); Hacks (HBO Max); Mythic Quest (Apple TV+); PEN15 (Hulu); Superstore (NBC); Zoey's Extraordinary Playlist (NBC)
2021-2022 (38th)	Abbott Elementary (ABC)	Atlanta (FX); Barry (HBO); Ghosts (CBS); Hacks (HBO Max); Only Murders in the Building (Hulu); Reservation Dogs (FX); Ted Lasso (Apple TV+)
2022-2023 (39th)	The Bear (FX)	Abbott Elementary (ABC); Barry (HBO); The Other Two (HBO Max); Poker Face (Peacock); Reservation Dogs (FX); Shrinking (Apple TV+); What We Do in the Shadows (FX)
2023-2024 (40th)	Hacks (HBO / Max)	Abbott Elementary (ABC); The Bear (FX); Girls5eva (Netflix); Reservation Dogs (FX); We Are Lady Parts (Peacock)
2024-2025 (41st)	The Studio (Apple TV+)	Abbott Elementary (ABC); English Teacher (FX); Hacks (HBO Max); Nobody Wants This (Netflix); The Rehearsal (HBO); Shrinking (Apple TV+); Somebody Somewhere (HBO); What We Do in the Shadows (FX)
2025–2026 (42nd)	Widow's Bay (Apple TV)	Abbott Elementary (ABC); The Comeback (HBO Max); The Fall and Rise of Reggie Dinkins (NBC); Hacks (HBO Max); The Lowdown (FX); Margo's Got Money Troubles (Apple TV); Shrinking (Apple TV)

== Multiple wins ==
3 wins

- Frasier (consecutive)

2 wins

- Arrested Development (consecutive)
- The Big Bang Theory
- The Cosby Show (consecutive)
- The Larry Sanders Show (consecutive)
- Louie
- Malcolm in the Middle (consecutive)
- Modern Family (consecutive)
- Murphy Brown
- The Office (US) (consecutive)
- Seinfeld (consecutive)

== Multiple nominees ==
7 nominations

- The Daily Show with Jon Stewart
- Everybody Loves Raymond
- Seinfeld

6 nominations

- The Big Bang Theory
- Frasier
- The Larry Sanders Show
- The Simpsons

5 nominations

- Abbott Elementary
- Hacks
- Veep

4 nominations

- Barry
- Cheers
- The Good Place
- Louie
- Murphy Brown
- The Office (U.S.)
- Parks and Recreation

3 nominations

- 30 Rock
- Atlanta
- Friends
- Modern Family
- Newhart
- Reservation Dogs
- Sex and the City
- Shrinking
- What We Do in the Shadows
- The Wonder Years

2 nominations

- 3rd Rock from the Sun
- Ally McBeal
- Arrested Development
- The Bear
- Black-ish
- Community
- The Cosby Show
- Curb Your Enthusiasm
- Fleabag
- Girls5eva
- Malcolm in the Middle
- The Marvelous Mrs. Maisel
- Master of None
- Northern Exposure
- The Office (U.K.)
- Roseanne
- Schitt's Creek
- Scrubs
- Ted Lasso
- Will & Grace

== Total awards by network ==
- NBC – 23
- ABC – 6
- Fox – 6
- CBS – 4
- FX – 4
- HBO/Max – 4
- Apple TV – 3
- Comedy Central – 2
- Amazon – 1
- Pop – 1
- Showtime – 1

== Total nominations by network ==
- NBC – 58
- HBO/Max – 35
- CBS – 28
- ABC – 20
- Fox – 20
- FX – 18
- Apple TV - 9
- Comedy Central – 9
- Netflix - 9
- Amazon – 5
- Peacock - 3
- BBC America - 2
- The CW - 2
- Hulu - 2
- Pop – 2
- Showtime – 2
- FXX - 1
- MTV - 1
- Starz - 1
- UPN - 1
- The WB - 1
