= 22nd TCA Awards =

US television awards ceremony in 2006

- Date: July 23, 2006
- Venue: The Ritz-Carlton Huntington Hotel and Spa, Pasadena, California

Highlights
- Program of the Year: Grey's Anatomy
- Outstanding New Program: My Name Is Earl

The 22nd TCA Awards were presented by the Television Critics Association. Mary Lynn Rajskub hosted the ceremony on July 23, 2006 at the Ritz-Carlton Huntington Hotel and Spa in Pasadena, California.

== Winners and nominees ==
| Category | Winner | Other Nominees |
|---|---|---|
| Program of the Year | Grey's Anatomy (ABC) | 24 (Fox); Lost (ABC); The Office (NBC); The Sopranos (HBO) |
| Outstanding Achievement in Comedy | The Office (NBC) | The Daily Show with Jon Stewart (Comedy Central); Everybody Hates Chris (UPN); My Name Is Earl (NBC); Scrubs (NBC) |
| Outstanding Achievement in Drama | Lost (ABC) | 24 (Fox); Grey's Anatomy (ABC); House (Fox); The Sopranos (HBO) |
| Outstanding Achievement in Movies, Miniseries and Specials | No Direction Home: Bob Dylan (PBS) | Bleak House (PBS); Elizabeth I (HBO); Sleeper Cell (Showtime); Viva Blackpool (BBC America) |
| Outstanding New Program of the Year | My Name Is Earl (NBC) | Big Love (HBO); The Colbert Report (Comedy Central); Everybody Hates Chris (UPN); Prison Break (Fox) |
| Individual Achievement in Comedy | Steve Carell - The Office (NBC) | Stephen Colbert - The Colbert Report (Comedy Central); Lauren Graham - Gilmore Girls (The WB); Jason Lee - My Name Is Earl (NBC); Jon Stewart - The Daily Show with Jon Stewart (Comedy Central) |
| Individual Achievement in Drama | Hugh Laurie - House (Fox) | Alan Alda - The West Wing (NBC); James Gandolfini - The Sopranos (HBO); Kyra Sedgwick - The Closer (TNT); Kiefer Sutherland - 24 (Fox) |
| Outstanding Achievement in Children's Programming | High School Musical (Disney Channel) | Dora the Explorer (Nickelodeon); Foster's Home for Imaginary Friends (Cartoon Network); Nick News with Linda Ellerbee (Nickelodeon); Sesame Street (PBS) |
| Outstanding Achievement in News and Information | Frontline (PBS) | 60 Minutes (CBS); American Masters: Newhart (PBS); Broadway: The Golden Age (PBS); Country Boys (PBS) |
| Heritage Award | The West Wing (NBC) | Hallmark Hall of Fame (CBS); Will & Grace (NBC) |
| Career Achievement Award | Carol Burnett | No other nominees |

=== Multiple wins ===
The following shows received multiple wins:

| Wins | Recipient |
|---|---|
| 2 | The Office |

=== Multiple nominations ===
The following shows received multiple nominations:

| Nominations | Recipient |
|---|---|
| 3 | 24 |
| 3 | My Name Is Earl |
| 3 | The Office |
| 3 | The Sopranos |
| 2 | The Colbert Report |
| 2 | The Daily Show with Jon Stewart |
| 2 | Everybody Hates Chris |
| 2 | Grey's Anatomy |
| 2 | House |
| 2 | Lost |
| 2 | The West Wing |
