= TCA Award for Outstanding New Program =

Annual US television award

The TCA Award for Outstanding New Program is an award given by the Television Critics Association.

== Winners and nominees ==
Year	Winner	Other Nominees
1997-1998 (14th)	Ally McBeal (Fox)	Dawson's Creek (The WB); Dharma & Greg (ABC); Nothing Sacred (ABC); South Park (Comedy Central)
1998-1999 (15th)	The Sopranos (HBO)	Cupid (ABC); Felicity (The WB); It's Like, You Know... (ABC); Sports Night (ABC); Will & Grace (NBC)
1999-2000 (16th)	The West Wing (NBC)	Freaks and Geeks (NBC); Judging Amy (CBS); Malcolm in the Middle (Fox); Once and Again (ABC)
2000-2001 (17th)	Gilmore Girls (The WB)	CSI: Crime Scene Investigation (CBS); Ed (NBC); The Job (ABC); Survivor (CBS)
2001-2002 (18th)	24 (Fox)	Alias (ABC); The Osbournes (MTV); The Shield (FX); Six Feet Under (HBO)
2002-2003 (19th)	Boomtown (NBC)	American Dreams (NBC); Everwood (The WB); Lucky (FX); The Wire (HBO)
2003-2004 (20th)	Arrested Development (Fox)	Deadwood (HBO); Joan of Arcadia (CBS); The O.C. (Fox); Wonderfalls (Fox)
2004-2005 (21st)	Lost (ABC)	Desperate Housewives (ABC); House (Fox); Rescue Me (FX); Veronica Mars (UPN)
2005-2006 (22nd)	My Name Is Earl (NBC)	Big Love (HBO); The Colbert Report (Comedy Central); Everybody Hates Chris (UPN); Prison Break (Fox)
2006-2007 (23rd)	Friday Night Lights (NBC)	30 Rock (NBC); Dexter (Showtime); Heroes (NBC); Ugly Betty (ABC)
2007-2008 (24th)	Mad Men (AMC)	Breaking Bad (AMC); Damages (FX); Flight of the Conchords (HBO); Pushing Daisies (ABC)
2008-2009 (25th)	True Blood (HBO)	Fringe (Fox); The Mentalist (CBS); The No. 1 Ladies' Detective Agency (HBO); United States of Tara (Showtime)
2009-2010 (26th)	Glee (Fox)	The Good Wife (CBS); Justified (FX); Modern Family (ABC); Parenthood (NBC)
2010-2011 (27th)	Game of Thrones (HBO)	Boardwalk Empire (HBO); The Killing (AMC); Terriers (FX); The Walking Dead (AMC)
2011-2012 (28th)	Homeland (Showtime)	Girls (HBO); New Girl (Fox); Revenge (ABC); Smash (NBC)
2012-2013 (29th)	The Americans (FX)	Elementary (CBS); House of Cards (Netflix); The Mindy Project (Fox); Orphan Black (BBC America)
2013-2014 (30th)	Orange Is the New Black (Netflix)	Brooklyn Nine-Nine (Fox); Fargo (FX); Sleepy Hollow (Fox); True Detective (HBO)
2014-2015 (31st)	Better Call Saul (AMC)	Empire (Fox); The Flash (The CW); Jane the Virgin (The CW); Transparent (Amazon)
2015-2016 (32nd)	Mr. Robot (USA)	Crazy Ex-Girlfriend (The CW); Marvel's Jessica Jones (Netflix); Master of None (Netflix); Underground (WGN America); UnREAL (Lifetime)
2016-2017 (33rd)	This Is Us (NBC)	Atlanta (FX); The Crown (Netflix); The Good Place (NBC); The Handmaid's Tale (Hulu); Stranger Things (Netflix)
2017-2018 (34th)	Killing Eve (BBC America)	Barry (HBO); Counterpart (Starz); GLOW (Netflix); The Marvelous Mrs. Maisel (Amazon); Mindhunter (Netflix)
2018-2019 (35th)	Russian Doll (Netflix)	Dead to Me (Netflix); The Other Two (Comedy Central); Pose (FX); Succession (HBO); What We Do in the Shadows (FX)
2019-2020 (36th)	Watchmen (HBO)	The Great (Hulu); The Mandalorian (Disney+); The Morning Show (Apple TV+); Never Have I Ever (Netflix); Zoey's Extraordinary Playlist (NBC)
2020-2021 (37th)	Ted Lasso (Apple TV+)	Bridgerton (Netflix); The Flight Attendant (HBO Max); Hacks (HBO Max); I May Destroy You (HBO); Mare of Easttown (HBO); P-Valley (Starz); WandaVision (Disney+)
2021-2022 (38th)	Abbott Elementary (ABC)	Ghosts (CBS); Only Murders in the Building (Hulu); Pachinko (Apple TV+); Reservation Dogs (FX on Hulu); Severance (Apple TV+); The White Lotus (HBO); Yellowjackets (Showtime)
2022-2023 (39th)	The Bear (FX)	Andor (Disney+); Interview with the Vampire (AMC); Jury Duty (Amazon Freevee); The Last of Us (HBO); Mrs. Davis (Peacock); Poker Face (Peacock); Shrinking (Apple TV+)
2023-2024 (40th)	Shōgun (FX)	Baby Reindeer (Netflix); Fallout (Amazon); Mr. & Mrs. Smith (Amazon); Ripley (Netflix); X-Men '97 (Disney+)
2024-2025 (41st)	The Pitt (HBO Max)	Common Side Effects (Adult Swim); English Teacher (FX); Matlock (CBS); Nobody Wants This (Netflix); North of North (Netflix); Paradise (Hulu); The Studio (Apple TV+)
2025–2026 (42nd)	Widow's Bay (Apple TV)	Alien: Earth (FX); The Fall and Rise of Reggie Dinkins (NBC); Heated Rivalry (Crave/HBO Max); A Knight of the Seven Kingdoms (HBO Max); The Lowdown (FX); Margo's Got Money Troubles (Apple TV); Pluribus (Apple TV)

== Total awards by network ==
- HBO/Max – 5
- NBC – 5
- Fox – 4
- FX – 3
- ABC – 2
- AMC – 2
- Apple TV – 2
- Netflix – 2
- BBC America – 1
- Showtime – 1
- USA – 1
- The WB – 1

== Total nominations by network ==
- HBO/Max – 24
- FX – 17
- NBC – 16
- Netflix – 16
- ABC – 15
- Fox – 15
- Apple TV – 9
- CBS – 9
- AMC – 6
- Amazon – 4
- Disney+ – 4
- Hulu – 4
- Showtime – 4
- The WB – 4
- Comedy Central – 3
- The CW – 3
- BBC America – 2
- Peacock – 2
- Starz – 2
- UPN – 2
- Adult Swim – 1
- Amazon Freevee – 1
- Crave – 1
- Lifetime – 1
- MTV – 1
- USA – 1
- WGN America – 1
