= 18th TCA Awards =

US television awards ceremony in 2002

- Date: July 20, 2002
- Venue: Ritz-Carlton Huntington Hotel and Spa, Pasadena, California

Highlights
- Program of the Year: 24
- Outstanding New Program: 24

The 18th TCA Awards were presented by the Television Critics Association. Bob Newhart hosted the ceremony on July 20, 2002, at the Ritz-Carlton Huntington Hotel and Spa in Pasadena, California.

== Winners and nominees ==
Category	Winner	Other nominees
Program of the Year	24 (Fox)	Band of Brothers (HBO); The Osbournes (MTV); The Shield (FX); Six Feet Under (HBO)
Outstanding Achievement in Comedy	The Bernie Mac Show (Fox)	Everybody Loves Raymond (CBS); Friends (NBC); The Osbournes (MTV); Scrubs (NBC)
Outstanding Achievement in Drama	Six Feet Under (HBO)	24 (Fox); CSI: Crime Scene Investigation (CBS); Gilmore Girls (The WB); The Shield (FX)
Outstanding Achievement in Movies, Miniseries and Specials	Band of Brothers (HBO)	9/11 (CBS); America: A Tribute to Heroes (all networks); The Blue Planet: Seas of Life (Discovery Channel); Frontier House (PBS)
Outstanding New Program of the Year	24 (Fox)	Alias (ABC); The Osbournes (MTV); The Shield (FX); Six Feet Under (HBO)
Individual Achievement in Comedy	Bernie Mac - The Bernie Mac Show (Fox)	Denis Leary - The Job (ABC); Matt LeBlanc - Friends (NBC); John C. McGinley - Scrubs (NBC); Ray Romano - Everybody Loves Raymond (CBS)
Individual Achievement in Drama	Michael Chiklis - The Shield (FX)	Lauren Graham - Gilmore Girls (The WB); Rachel Griffiths - Six Feet Under (HBO); Martin Sheen - The West Wing (NBC); Kiefer Sutherland - 24 (Fox)
Outstanding Achievement in Children's Programming	SpongeBob SquarePants (Nickelodeon)	Between the Lions (PBS); Little Bill (Nickelodeon); Samurai Jack (Cartoon Network)
Outstanding Achievement in News and Information	Frontline (PBS)	60 Minutes (CBS); American Masters (PBS); Nightline (ABC); The O'Reilly Factor (Fox News Channel)
Heritage Award	The Simpsons (Fox)	60 Minutes (CBS); Hallmark Hall of Fame (CBS); Law & Order (NBC); Saturday Night Live (NBC)
Career Achievement Award	Bill Cosby (rescinded in 2018)	Carol Burnett; Larry Gelbart; Aaron Spelling; Mike Wallace

=== Multiple wins ===
The following shows received multiple wins:

Wins	Recipient
2	24
2	The Bernie Mac Show

=== Multiple nominations ===
The following shows received multiple nominations:

Nominations	Recipient
4	24
4	The Shield
4	Six Feet Under
3	The Osbournes
2	60 Minutes
2	Band of Brothers
2	The Bernie Mac Show
2	Everybody Loves Raymond
2	Friends
2	Gilmore Girls
2	Scrubs
