= Deadbeat parent =

Pejorative term

Deadbeat parent is an American English pejorative term referring to parents who do not fulfill their parental responsibilities, especially when they evade court-ordered child support obligations or custody arrangements. They are also referred to as absentee fathers and mothers. The gender-specific deadbeat father and deadbeat mother are commonly used to refer to people who have parented a child and intentionally fail to pay child support ordered by a family law court or statutory agency.

== Child support arrears ==
According to the United States Census Bureau, 42% of custodial mothers (as "obligees") received all child support that they were owed and 70.5% received some in 2009. Additionally, 34.1% of custodial fathers (as "obligees") received all child support that they were owed and 72.9% received some.

Child support assessments are made based on a variety of formulae, and vary from state to state in the United States. According to one study 38% of Illinois "obligor" parents not paying child-support said they lacked the money to pay; 23% used non-payment to protest a lack of visitation rights; and 69% complained of no accountability over the spending of their child support money, while 13% said they did not want their child or children and 12% denied parentage, (see paternity fraud).

According to a California study, 76% of the $14.4 billion in child support arrears in California has been attributed to "obligors" who lack the ability to pay (see Figure 1, pp. 5-4). In California, the "deadbeat" parents had a median annual income of $6349, arrears of $9447, ongoing support of $300 per month. One reason given for this was that 71% of the orders were set by default—meaning that person who supposedly owes support was not personally served with a notice to appear before the court or administrative agency. A notice is sent to the last known address, which may have changed.

Alternative terms for deadbeat parents who lack the ability to pay are "deadbroke" and "turnip" (as in "you can't get blood out of a turnip").

== Child support enforcement in the United States ==
=== Legislation ===
The U.S. law known as the Bradley Amendment was passed in 1986 to automatically trigger a non-expiring lien whenever child support becomes overdue.

- The law overrides any state's statute of limitations.
- The law disallows any judicial discretion, even from bankruptcy judges.
- The law requires that the payment amounts be maintained without regard for the physical capability of the person owing child support to promptly notify the authorities of changes in their circumstances, or their awareness of the need to make the notification.

The Personal Responsibility and Work Opportunity Reconciliation Act (PRWORA) of 1996, 42 U.S.C. 653a, established in 1997 a New Hire Registry in which all employers in the United States, private or public, State and Federal, must report all newly hired employees within 20 days or less depending on how they report. The report includes name, address and Social Security number of each new employee. States are required to match reports of newly hired employees against social security numbers of persons having outstanding child support orders, and to issue an order to the employer to withhold and forward unpaid child support payments.

Many U.S. states have passed laws that allows the Department of Public Safety in the state to use its information to find the non-compliant parent and call them to account for their actions.

There are now many collections-oriented sites on the Internet that mention or highlight deadbeat parents, some even showing mug shots and marking the photos as "found" in the style of the FBI's "most wanted" list.

=== Action taken against defaulting parents ===
In the United States, persons in arrears for child support payments are potentially subject to incarceration. Other penalties for child-support non-payment also exist. Many U.S. states suspend an individual's licenses (i.e. driver's license, business license, contractor license) if that individual has significant arrearage in support payments or does not consistently pay support. This authority does not extend to professionals who receive licensure through non-governmental agencies. In 2000, the state of Tennessee revoked the driver's licenses of 1,372 people who collectively owed more than $13 million USD in child support. In Texas non-custodial parents behind more than three months in child-support payments can have court-ordered payments deducted from their wages, can have federal income tax refund checks, lottery winnings, or other money that may be due from state or federal sources intercepted by child support enforcement agencies, can have licenses (including hunting and fishing licenses) suspended, and a judge may sentence a nonpaying parent to jail and enter a judgment for past due child support. However, on 4 September 1998, the Supreme Court of Alaska upheld a law allowing state agencies to revoke driver's licenses of parents seriously delinquent in child support obligations.

== See also ==
- California Child Support Guideline Review
- Child custody
- Child neglect
- Child Support Agency Australia
- Child support in the United States
- Divorce
- Family law
- Paternity
- Paternity fraud
- Tax refund interception
