= Income shares =

Formula used by some states to establish the child support amount of each child

An income shares formula is used by many states to establish the child support amount of each child rather than what it actually costs to raise a child. According to the National Conference of State Legislatures, in income shares model, both parents are responsible for contributing financially to the children. Income shares tables calculating child support are not based directly on actual spending on children but rather on indirect estimates of child costs. Income shares model depend on that a child receive the same proportion of parental income and also it assumes that child costs reflect the spending necessary to restore a family's standard of living back to what it was prior to the divorce or having a child. It is very reasonable for the children who their parents divorced. It is consistent with the Uniform Marriage and Divorce Act. This technique was first developed in the 19th century to answer economic questions among different family types, but was never intended to measure the cost of rearing children. The purpose of the income shares- child support lead to more fair and regular fundamental child support awards. Also, governments should regard different political balances that are equality and transparency.

Approximately half of all guidelines for child support in the United States are based on the income shares child support model. The income shares model for child support was developed by economist Dr. Robert G. Williams and was based on the work of Thomas Espenshade. Espenshade analyzed the 1972–1973 Consumer Expenditure Survey to determine the costs of raising children in the United States. The number of states using the income shares model is decreasing.

Forty states are using the income shares model in the U.S.A : '' Alabama, Arizona, California, Colorado, Connecticut, Florida, Georgia, Idaho, Illinois, Indiana, Iowa, Kansas, Kentucky, Louisiana, Maine, Maryland, Massachusetts, Michigan, Minnesota, Missouri, Nebraska, New Hampshire, New Jersey, New Mexico, New York, North Carolina, Ohio, Oklahoma, Oregon, Pennsylvania, Rhode Island, South Carolina, South Dakota, Tennessee, Utah, Vermont, Virginia, Washington, West Virginia, Wyoming, Guam, Virgin Islands.''

Child support and the income shares have some purposes like these are creating a support for children consistent with the suitable needs of children and parents to pay, making child support orders coherent and giving guidance to courts and parents to set child support. Child support is prorated between each parent depend on their total income.

== Child support guidelines and transition to income share model ==
Child support guidelines are used to calculate support spending. These ones have replaced court assumed support payments in the late 1970s and the government mandated that in 1988. There are two different types of guidelines about encouragement of divorce: Income shares and percentage of obligor income. In the parents who have high income, obligor income models are unstable and it has problematic process. So, most government have turned to income share model from percentage of obligor income. Problems of divorce results are usually resolved with income share models.

== Income shares calculations ==
Calculations is related with how much money is necessary to grow a child in that a certain country. There are too many factors for calculating the amount of cost which child should receive each month: Adjusted gross income of parents, special needs the child can have, including mental or physical illnesses which may require the parents, time that parents spend with the children, medical costs, child care expenses, extraordinary school costs and healthcare insurance. Totally incomes of the parents form the income shares calculations. The court decides that how much incomes the child needs to fulfill primary costs. Also, the number of children is so important for the court order. Finally, It determines how much each of the parents support to the total income. In some conditions, the court can decide to change an existing child support judgement. It can increase or decrease the amount of child support. The non-custodial parent pays the money to the custodial parent for the child. The custodial parent pays all of the money straight to the child's needs. Forty states of U.S.A have taken into account this process since 2019. The net income of each parent, the income shares guidelines are tied to the actual costs of raising a child — as measured by the Bureau of Labor Statistics'

=== Health Insurance ===
The total insurance premium of the child add to the basic child support. There are the rate based on the parents' net incomes. If one of them pays the health insurance, they receive credit for pay. The parents start the insurance coverage for the children. If the parents have no health insurance, one of these parents have to provide the health insurance when they are available.

=== Medical Expenses ===
Court can want from parents to contribute to these obligations. It can usually be in same rate as net incomes.

=== Child Care Expenses ===
Child care expanses are proportional for parents. It contains after/before school cares.

== Some strong aspects and failings of income shares ==
When the income increases, the rate of spending income of child support decreases. Also, researchers claimed that the income shares depend on economic researches. '' One study has suggested that the underlying economic data failed to reflect true child-related expenditures in upper income families including such non-consumer expenditures as principal on home, savings, and trusts for the benefit of children. Thus, the income shares model does not accomplish the goal of ensuring that parents, after they break up, continue to spend on the children the same percentage of income that they would have spent if they were together.''

== Importance of income shares and child support ==
Divorce usually affect women negatively. In contrast to men, divorce causes decreasing of the women's economic welfare. ''Bartfeld (1997) estimates that one year after separation, not only did mothers and children lose, on average, 35 to 45% of needs-adjusted income, but 31% of mothers lived below the poverty threshold.'' Income shares is one of the policies that support the women for child-care in the divorce process. ''Bartfeld (2000) uses the Survey of Income and Program Participation (SIPP) and finds that though custodial mothers remain more economically disadvantaged than noncustodial fathers, child support narrowed the gap in needs-adjusted incomes by 30%.''

- Bradley Amendment
- California Child Support Guideline Review
- Child Support Agency (UK)
- Child Support Agency Australia
- Child support in the United States
- Costs of raising a child
