= Child support in the United States =

In the United States, child support is the ongoing obligation for a periodic payment made by an "obligor" (or paying parent or payer) to an "obligee" (or receiving party or recipient) for the financial care and support of children of a relationship or a (possibly terminated) marriage. The laws governing this kind of obligation vary dramatically state-by-state and tribe-by-tribe among Native Americans. Each individual state and federally recognized tribe is responsible for developing its own guidelines for determining child support.

Typically the obligor is a non-custodial parent. Typically the obligee is a custodial parent, caregiver or guardian, or a government agency, and does not have to spend the money on the child. In the U.S., there is no gender requirement for child support; for example, a father may pay a mother or a mother may pay a father. In addition, where there is joint custody, in which the child has two custodial parents and no non-custodial parents, a custodial parent may be required to pay the other custodial parent.

Today, the federal child support enforcement program is the responsibility of the Office of Child Support Enforcement, an office of Administration for Children and Families in the Department of Health and Human Services. Federal regulations promulgated pursuant to Title IV-D of the Social Security Act require uniform application of child support guidelines throughout a state, but each state can determine its own method of calculating support. At a minimum, 45 CFR 302.56 requires each state to establish and publish a Guideline that is presumptively (but rebuttably) correct, and review the guideline, at a minimum, every four years. Most states have therefore adopted their own "Child Support Guidelines Worksheet" which local courts and state Child Support Enforcement Offices use for determining the "standard calculation" of child support in that state. Courts may choose to deviate from this standard calculation in any particular case. The US has reciprocal agreements with a number of countries regarding recovery of child support and is a party to the Hague Maintenance Convention 2007.

== History ==
Historically, the right of a child to the support of his or her parents was regulated solely by the separate states, territories, and Native American tribes.

Prior to criminal nonsupport laws, financial support could only be obtained through the doctrine of necessaries, poor law, and legal separation. Enforcement of child support obligations began in the United States as a criminal measure. The effort to criminalize failure to pay child support began in the late 19th century, with moral condemnation, the desire for stronger punishments, and the need for extradition primary factors in this movement. Whether to make nonsupport a felony or a misdemeanor was hotly contested, leading eventually to the passage of the Uniform Desertion and Non-Support Act described below. By the 1910s, nearly every state in the United States had criminal nonsupport statutes on the books.

The criminalization of nonsupport also led to a heightened role of probation officers in nonsupport judgments. Though incarceration was and still remains a popular penalty for nonsupport, early proponents of criminal nonsupport wanted a penalty that would "maximize deterrence, preserve the family...and lighten the burden on charities and the state to support women and children." New York, which authorized probation as a penalty for nonsupport in 1901, advanced four benefits to probation over incarceration: "'(1) Punishment without disgrace, and effective without producing embitterment, resentment or demoralization," (2) judicial discretion to make the punishment fit the crime, (3) "[p]unishment that is borne solely by the guilty and displacing a system that frequently involved the innocent and helpless," and (4) punishment 'attended by increased revenue to the city and by a saving in expense.'" The passing of criminal nonsupport statutes began the blurring of the civil-criminal line in child support cases that continues to spark debate among legal scholars.

The federal government of the United States became involved in providing welfare assistance to impoverished children in 1935 through the Aid to Families with Dependent Children program. In turn, the federal government realized that many children were entering that program because noncustodial parents were often avoiding their fair share of the costs of raising their children, and began to develop the foundation of today's overarching federal framework for child support enforcement.

== Support models ==
States follow one of three basic models, or formulas, for calculating a child support obligation: (1) the Incomes Shares model, (2) the Percentage of Income model, or (3) the Melson Formula model.

- The Income Shares Model asserts that minor children should receive the same amount of parental support as if the parents lived together. This model calculates support as the approximate share of each parent's income that would have been devoted to the child in a shared household. Calculations vary by state but essentially add both parents' income. The amount needed to support each child is then determined using basic parameters and then adjusted according to the specific case and varies by state. Finally, the support obligation is pro-rated between the parents depending on their share of the total income. In other words, if a child's custodial parent makes $2,000 a month and the noncustodial parent brings in $3,000, the noncustodial parent assumes 60% of the support obligation.
- The Percentage of Income model calculates support as a percentage of the noncustodial parent's income. This model assumes that the custodial parent's support is spent entirely on the child. The support amount is adjusted as in the prior model. (Note: The District of Columbia and Massachusetts apply a formula that is a hybrid, of the Income Shares and the Percentage of Income models.)
- The Melson Formula is a more complex version of the Income Shares model. One of its special features is a Standard of Living Adjustment (SOLA), which automatically enables the child to share in a parent or parents’ increased income. This is a six-step process which considers the children's primary support needs, child care and extraordinary medical expenses, and the SOLA. These amounts are added together, and then the courts look at each parent's minimal self-support needs and percentage of total net income to determine the support obligation. The formula is named for Judge Elwood F. Melson, Jr. of the Delaware Family Court, who developed the formula in the 1970s and 1980s.

== Executive branch concerns ==
President Gerald Ford issued a signing statement on signing the Social Services Amendments of 1974 on January 4, 1975. Although generally favorable, Ford expressed concern about what he saw as excessively "injecting the Federal Government into domestic relations".

== State by state provisions ==
State	Guidelines	Enforcement
Alabama	Child Support Guidelines	Division of Child Support Enforcement
Alaska	Civil Rule 90.3	Division of Child Support Enforcement
Arizona	Child Support Guidelines is based on the Income Shares model.	Division of Child Support Enforcement
Arkansas	Administrative Order of the Supreme Court No. 10	Division of Child Support Enforcement
California	Family Code §§ 4050-4076 is based on the Income Shares model The Judicial Council of California is required to conduct the California Child Support Guideline Review at least every four years.	Department of Child Support Services (DCSS) provides public child support enforcement
Colorado	Rev. Stat. §§ 14-10-115 et seq., based on the Income Shares model	Division of Child Support Enforcement
Connecticut	Child Support Guidelines Booklet	Bureau of Child Support Enforcement
Delaware	Child Support Guidelines	Division of Child Support Enforcement
District of Columbia	Code Ann. § 16-916.1, based on the Income Shares model	Child Support Enforcement Division
Florida	Child Support Guidelines, based on the Income Shares model	Child Support Enforcement Program
Georgia	Child Support Guidelines	Office of Child Support Services
Hawaii	Child Support Guidelines	Child Support Enforcement Agency
Idaho	R. Civ. Pro. 6(c)(6)	Child Support Services
Illinois	Child Support Guidelines	Child Support Enforcement
Indiana	Child Support Guidelines, based on the Income Shares model	Child Support Bureau
Iowa	Child Support Guidelines, based on the Income Shares model	Department of Human Services
Kansas	Child Support Guidelines	Child Support Enforcement
Kentucky	Rev. Stat. §§ 403–210 to -213, based on the Income Shares model	Division of Child Support Enforcement
Louisiana	Rev. Stat. 9:315.1 et seq., based on the Income Shares model	Support Enforcement Services, Office of Family Support
Maine	Revised Statute Ann. tit. 19-A, §§ 2001–2010, based on the Income Shares model	Division of Support Enforcement & Recovery
Maryland	Family Law Code Ann. §§ 12-201 et seq., based on the Income Shares model	Child Support Enforcement Administration
Massachusetts	Child Support Guidelines, based on the Income Shares model	Dep't of Revenue, Child Support Enforcement Division
Michigan	child Support Formula, based on the Income Shares model	Family Independence Agency
Minnesota	Stat. Ann. §§ 518.551 et seq.	Child Support Enforcement Division Minnesota Worksheets
Mississippi	Code §§ 43-19-101 et seq.	Division of Child Support Enforcement
Missouri	Child Support Guidelines, based on the Income Shares model	Child Support Enforcement
Montana	Child Support Guidelines	Division of Child Support Enforcement
Nebraska	Child Support Guidelines, based on the Income Shares model	Child Support Enforcement Office
Nevada	Revised Statute §§ 125B.070 to -.080	Office of Child Support Enforcement
New Hampshire	Revised Statute §§ 458-C:1 to -:7, based on the Income Shares model	Division of Child Support Services
New Jersey	Rules of Court Appendix IX, based on the Income Shares model	Office of Child Support Enforcement
New Mexico	Statute §§ 40-4-11.1 to -11.6, based on the Income Shares model	Child Support Enforcement Division
New York	Domestic Relations Law. § 240(1-b), and articles 4, 5, 5A, and 5B of the Family Court Act, based on the Income Shares model	Division of Child Support Enforcement
North Carolina	Child Support Guidelines, based on the Income Shares model	Child Support Enforcement
North Dakota	Child Support Guidelines	Child Support Enforcement Agency
Ohio	Rev. Code §§ 3119.01 et seq., based on the Income Shares model	Office of Child Support
Oklahoma	State title 43, §§ 118 to 120	Department of Human Services
Oregon	Child Support Guidelines, based on the Income Shares model	Division of Child Support
Pennsylvania	Revisede Civil Procedures 1910.16-1 to -5	Child Support Program
Rhode Island	Child Services Guidelines Administrative Order	Dep't of Human Services
South Carolina	Social Services Regulation 114–4710 to -4750	Child Support Services Division
South Dakota	Code Laws §§ 25-7-6.1 et seq.	Office of Child Support Enforcement
Tennessee	Child Support Guidelines	Child Support Services
Texas	Family Code §§ 154.001 et seq.	Attorney General Child Support Services
Utah	Code §§ 78B-12-202 et seq., based on the Income Shares model	Office of Recovery Services
Vermont	Stat. title 15, §§ 653-657	Office of Child Support
Virginia	Code §§ 20–108.1, 20–108.2	Department of Social Services, Division of Child Support
Washington	Revised Code of Washington §§ 26.19.001 et seq.	Division of Child Support
West Virginia	Child Support Guidelines, based on the Income Shares model	Bureau for Child Support Enforcement
Wisconsin	Child Support Guidelines	Bureau of Child Support
Wyoming	Child Support Guidelines	Child Support Enforcement

== Penalties ==
In 2000, the state of Tennessee revoked the driver's licenses of 1,372 people who collectively owed more than $13 million in child support. In Texas non-custodial parents behind more than three months in child-support payments can have court-ordered payments deducted from their wages, can have federal income tax refund checks, lottery winnings, or other money that may be due from state or federal sources intercepted by child support enforcement agencies, can have licenses (including hunting and fishing licenses) suspended, and a judge may sentence a nonpaying parent to jail and enter a judgment for past due child support. Some have taken the view that such penalties are unconstitutional. On September 4, 1998, the Supreme Court of Alaska upheld a law allowing state agencies to revoke driver's licenses of parents seriously delinquent in child support obligations. And in the case of United States of America v. Sage, U.S. Court of Appeals (2nd Cir., 1996), the court upheld the constitutionality of a law allowing federal fines and up to two years imprisonment for a person willfully failing to pay more than $5,000 in child support over a year or more when the child resides in a different state from that of the non-custodial parent.

The U.S. law commonly known as the Bradley Amendment was passed in 1986 to automatically trigger a non expiring lien whenever child support becomes past-due. The law overrides any state's statute of limitations; disallows any judicial discretion, even from bankruptcy judges; and requires that the payment amounts be maintained without regard for the physical capability of the person owing child support (the obligor) to make the notification or regard for their awareness of the need to make the notification. The obligee may forgive such debts.

When past-due child support is owed to a state as a result of welfare paid out, the state is free to forgive some or all of it under what's known as an offer in compromise.

== Interstate enforcement ==
=== Final judgment ===
Under the United States Constitution Article Four, full faith and credit shall be given in each state to the public acts, records and judicial proceedings of every other state. Courts have used this article to enforce final judgments that have been registered within a state. Normally a judgment must be final before it can be registered. The Restatement of Conflict (Second), under the topic of Defenses to Recognition and Enforcement, states that a judgment rendered in one state need not be recognized or enforced in a sister state insofar as the judgment remains subject to modification. A local court is free to recognize or enforce a judgment that remains subject to modification under the local law.

Child support orders are considered judgments of this sort. To satisfy full faith and credit, the local law of the state of rendition will be applied to determine whether a judgment is modifiable—particularly in respect to past and future financial obligations.

=== Uniform Desertion and Non-Support Act of 1910 ===
In 1910, the National Conference of Commissioners on Uniform State Laws approved the Uniform Desertion and Non-Support Act. The act made it a punishable offense for a husband to desert, willfully neglect or refuse to provide for the support and maintenance of his wife in destitute or necessitous circumstances, or for a parent to fail in the same duty to his child less than 16 years of age. The 1910 act sought to improve the enforcement of the duties of support, but it did not take into account payers who fled the jurisdiction. With the increasing mobility of the population, welfare departments had to support the destitute families because the extradition process was inefficient and often unsuccessful.

=== Uniform Reciprocal Enforcement of Support Act of 1950 (URESA) ===
In 1950, The National Conference of Commissions on Uniform State Laws published the Uniform Reciprocal Enforcement of Support Act (URESA). The Commission stated that, "The purposes of this act are to improve and extend by reciprocal legislation the enforcement of duties of support and to make uniform the law with respect thereto." URESA sought to enforce the provisions in two ways: criminal enforcement and civil enforcement. Criminal enforcement relied upon the obligee state demanding the extradition of the obligor, or for the obligor to surrender. Civil enforcement relied upon the obligee to initiate proceedings in his/her state. The initiating state would determine if the obligor had a duty of support. If the initiating court upheld the claim, the initiating court would forward the case to the obligor's state. The responding state, having personal jurisdiction over the obligor, would provide notice and a hearing for obligor. After this hearing, the responding court would enforce the support order.

=== Revised Uniform Reciprocal Enforcement of Support Act of 1958 (RURESA) ===
In 1958, the Uniform Laws Commission again amended URESA, which later became known as the Revised Uniform Reciprocal Enforcement of Support Act (RURESA). The amendments involved two important changes to URESA.

The amendments sought to correct a problem created by URESA. In some cases, the responding court only had evidence from the obligor and not have any evidence from the initiating state or the obligee. The responding court, with only one side represented tended to benefit the obligor. The commission's solution was to amend URESA so the initiating state and the obligee would provide evidence to the responding court along with the original case file, so the responding court would have positions from both parties.

The commission also provided a second method to obtain redress via civil enforcement. The new method permitted the obligee to register the foreign support order in a court of the obligor's state, and present that case directly to the foreign court.

RURESA provided new protection for mothers against noncompliant fathers; however, RURESA created a new problem—multiple support orders. Since every state could both enforce and modify a support order, a new support order could be entered in each state. Thus, if the father moved from State A to State B to State C to State D, and if the mother continually registered and had the order modified, then there would be four separate and independent support orders. RURESA allowed state courts to modify the original order so long as the court applied its own procedural law and the law of the original state, unless that contravened its own public policy. The Commission intended to correct the problem of inconsistent multiple orders by only allowing the support orders to be modified based upon a single state's law. In theory, states A, B and C could only modify a support order based upon the original state's substantive law; thus, all the support orders should be identical. In practice, however, this rule created ambiguities concerning whether child support guidelines are procedural or substantive, and if substantive, whether application of that substantive law contravened some public policy. The multiple order issue remained a problem.

=== Uniform Interstate Family Support Act of 1992 (UIFSA) ===
In 1992, NCCUSL completely revised and replaced URESA and RURESA with the Uniform Interstate Family Support Act (UIFSA) to correct the problem of multiple orders. UIFSA corrected this problem by providing that only one state would possess the power to make or modify child support at any one time ("continuing exclusive jurisdiction"). The state with continuous exclusive jurisdiction would use its own child support guidelines. Thus, if the child or either one of the parents remained in the original state, then that state retained jurisdiction and only that state could modify the support order. Only if both parents and the child left the state could another state assume child support jurisdiction (although any state could enforce the original state's order, regardless of residence of parent or child).

In 1996, NCCUSL revised UIFSA and the United States Congress passed the Personal Responsibility and Work Opportunity Reconciliation Act of 1996 (PRWORA), which required that all states adopt the 1996 version of UIFSA. In 2001, NCCUSL adopted additional amendments to UIFSA. As of 2011, only a few states had adopted the 2001 amendments.

In 2008, UIFSA was revised to allow implementation of the Hague Maintenance Convention which ensures a uniform policy amongst countries and a way to organize child support issues globally. Critically, orders are recognized and enforced between parties to the convention. After the federal government made implementation of the 2008 version a requirement for federal child support system funding, it was adopted in all states. The Convention entered into force in the United States on 1 January 2017.

UIFSA consists of five main parts: General Provisions, Establishing a Support Order, Enforcing a Support Order, Modifying a Support Order, and Parentage.

== Statutory conflicts ==
Every state's guidelines are unique, so every state awards different monetary amounts. Between two states, the difference in award's amounts may be nominal when taken on a weekly basis. Over long periods, however, these weekly differences accumulate to material sums. A conflict of laws issue can confront courts.

For simplicity, this article uses the model where the mother becomes the parent with custody of the children and the father makes child support payments, with the understanding that this model has become less typical. For example, a man and a woman marry in West Virginia. During the marriage, the husband and the wife have children. In West Virginia, the husband and the wife divorce. West Virginia issues a divorce decree that gives the wife custody of the children and orders the husband to pay child support. Subsequently, the wife moves to Connecticut with the children. Due to a change in circumstances, the husband, who may or may not still reside in West Virginia, seeks a modification of West Virginia's divorce decree. The conflict was over which state's guidelines are to apply.

The commission, which Congress created in 1988 to recommend `how to improve the interstate establishment and enforcement of child support awards,' favored a system under which the modifying jurisdiction's law would apply. Some witnesses testified that the law most advantageous to the child should govern, others testified that the law where the obligor resides should govern, and still others testified that the law where the child resides should govern. The Commission ultimately recommended `that the procedural and substantive law of the forum state should govern in establishment and modification proceedings,' citing the `ease and efficiency of application of local law by decision-makers' as an important consideration. The official UIFSA commentary [to UIFSA section 303] echoes this concern for efficiency.

=== District of Columbia ===
In 1993, the District of Columbia Court of Appeals held that the child's domicile governs which guidelines should apply. In this case the parents married in the District and family moved to Maryland. The divorced father returned to the District, and the mother and the children remained in Maryland. The court granted the father's request that Maryland's guidelines apply following precedent while stating that the "governmental interest analysis test" would lead to the same result.

== Deadbeat parents ==
Non-custodial parents who avoid their child support obligations are sometimes termed deadbeat parents. Parents who share an equal role in parenting are far more likely to comply, with child support compliance going up above 90% when the payer states she (or he) believes he has a relatively equal role in parenting.

The US Department of Health and Human Services estimates that 68% of child support cases had arrears owed in 2003, a 15% increase from 53% in 1999. It is claimed that some of these arrearage cases are due to administrative practices such as imputing income to parents where it does not exist and issuing default orders of support.

According to one study reasons given for non-payment of support were as follows:

Reason	Percent
Inability to pay	38%
Protesting lack of visitation	23%
Lack of accountability	14%
Prefer to give up a child	13%
Denied paternity	12%

According to another study, 76% of the $14 billion in child support arrears in California was by parents who lacked the ability to pay. The "deadbeat" parents had a median annual income of $6,349, arrears of $9,447 and an ongoing support of $300 per month because 71% of the orders were set by default.

== Child support and welfare ==
Since the 1996 Personal Responsibility and Work Opportunity Reconciliation Act (PRWORA), a major impetus to collection of child support is the Welfare law. A custodial parent receiving public assistance, e.g., via Temporary Assistance for Needy Families (TANF), is required to assign child support to the Department of Welfare to receive assistance. The custodial parent must also pursue child support. Any payment is diverted to the welfare program as partial reimbursement. Typically the amount of child support equals or exceeds the assistance grant, allowing the family to leave the cash assistance program (potentially remaining eligible for food stamps, etc.) Other provisions of PRWORA require and assist the custodial parent to find employment (such as buying new work clothes). Child support enforcement programs in all 50 states are primarily federally funded. States whose enforcement is not in PRWORA compliance risk a 5% penalty.

Despite concerns that this provision generates government revenue, HHS reported that in fiscal year 2003, 90% of child support collections went directly to families. In 47 states the percent of payments going to families was 86% or more and in seven states exceeded 95%. Half of unpaid child support is owed to the government. Sherri Z. Heller, Ed.D., Commissioner of U.S. Office of Child Support Enforcement stated, "We need to be more aggressive about leveraging older debt owed to the government as an incentive to obtain more reliable payments of current support to families." Towards this end, the Social Security Administration provides up to $4.1 billion in financial incentives to states that create support and arrearage orders, and then collect.

== Housing and common wages ==
Some states (such as California) automatically garnish up to 50% of pre-tax income to pay child support arrears. This can present a hardship in states whose cost of living is high. The Out of Reach report produced by the National Low Income Housing Coalition sets 30% of household income as an affordable level for housing costs. After a loss of 50% of takehome income, the suggested expenditure on rent also decreases 50%.

California's Fair market rent (FMR) for a two-bedroom apartment is $1,149. In order to afford rent and utilities, without paying more than 30% of income on housing, a household must earn $3,829 monthly or $45,950 annually. Assuming a standard work schedule, housing alone requires a wage of $22.09, far above California's $8.00 minimum. Adding child support essentially doubles the necessary income. If the obligor has no other child support debts, earns California minimum wage working 40 hours a week, has no benefits, and the custodial spouse does not work, the expected payment is closer to $320.

== Audits ==
In many counties, such as Illinois’ Cook and Kane counties, the division audit themselves. However, other jurisdictions adopt different methods—for example, in 2003 independent auditors reviewed and audited the Child Support Enforcement Agency of Hawaii. Texas has also conducted an independent audit. Clark County, Nevada's, district attorney office was independently audited in 2003 regarding child support payment collections. In 2003, Maryland recommended outside audits on its five child support enforcement operations.

While county reports are the official records, states also have their reports.

== Imprisonment ==
Most courts addressing the issue of imprisonment for child support deficiencies since the United States Supreme Court's ruling in Lassiter vs Department of Social Services, 452 U.S. 18 (1981) have held that appointed counsel is required if the obligor's liberty is at stake. In March 2006, the Supreme Court of New Jersey, upheld this principle in the case of Anne Pasqua, et al. v. Hon. Gerald Council, et al. As of August 2006, at least four states (New Hampshire, Pennsylvania, Virginia, and South Carolina) do not consistently appoint attorneys in enforcement proceedings. As of 2011 court challenges were pending in Pennsylvania and New Hampshire.

In 2011, the United States Supreme Court ruled in Turner v. Rogers South Carolina had no legal obligation to provide appointed counsel to Turner, who was jailed for child support non-payment. The Court held that Turner was not entitled to a public defender in cases regarding family nonsupport. However, in cases in which a state is not required to provide counsel, it must provide some other safeguard to reduce the risk of erroneous deprivation of liberty in civil contempt cases, and the Court ruled that the State of South Carolina had failed to provide sufficient safeguards.

The right to a jury trial is abridged in criminal non-support cases when the defendant is charged with misdemeanor non-support. The judge can incarcerate the obligor for contempt of court for some time, presumably until the balance is brought current, similar to debtors' prisons of prior eras. Jail complicates child support payments, which is why some states suspend sentences and impose a probationary period during which payments must be made and/or employment searches conducted, with jail reserved for uncooperative offenders.

== Paternity fraud, not-adopted, non-biological children ==
Paternity questions which complicate the issue of child support can be due to incorrect information, fraudulent intent, or default judgements. Misattributed paternity refers to any situation where the incorrect man is identified as or determined by a court to be the father of a child that is not biologically his. Misattributed paternity often occurs as result of unintentional error, typically on the part of the birth mother. In contrast, paternity fraud occurs when a man is deliberately misled to believe or misidentified as the father of a child that is not biologically his. Financial incentives, such as child support, are often perceived to be a major motivation for a birth mother to commit paternity fraud. The non-biological father may be liable for child support even if paternity fraud is proven as many jurisdictions limit the amount of time allowed to challenge paternity. In most jurisdictions, the courts can declare the male who acts as the child's father to be the father through the equitable operation of an estoppel. Once a man declares a child as his offspring and lives with the child for a period of time, the court may assign the putative father all of the obligations of parenthood even if the child is not biologically his.

== Criticism ==
Current child support guidelines and policies have been criticized by fathers' rights advocacy groups, as well as by feminists advocating gender equality and reproductive choice for men.

One persuasive criticism of the current legal regime of child support in the United States is that it is only facially civil in nature and circumvents the procedural protections of the criminal law while still using criminal enforcement machinery. Because nonsupport began as a criminal offense, it still retains many criminal enforcement mechanisms (incarceration, driver's license suspension, denial of passport applications, etc.). However, because child support enforcement is now branded as part of the civil law, respondents do not have the constitutional protections afforded by criminal procedure. This includes right to trial by jury (excluding Texas), right to counsel, and right to cross-examination, among others. Scholars argue that nonsupport should be fully decriminalized, as returning to criminal enforcement would create more stigma while not necessarily afforded more protections to respondents.

Current child support guidelines and policies have also been criticized for requiring boys and men who are victims of rape to pay child support to the women who rape them. Men who assert that a child was conceived as a result of deception, birth control fraud or sperm theft have also challenged their obligation to pay child support.

Melanie McCulley, a South Carolina attorney coined the term male abortion in 1998, suggesting that a father should be allowed to disclaim his obligations to an unborn child early in the pregnancy. Proponents hold that concept begins with the premise that when an unmarried woman becomes pregnant, she has the option of abortion, adoption, or parenthood; and argues, in the context of legally recognized gender equality, that in the earliest stages of pregnancy the putative (alleged) father should have the same human rights to relinquish all future parental rights and financial responsibility—leaving the informed mother with the same three options.

McCulley's male abortion concept aims to equalize the legal status of unwed men and unwed women by giving the unwed man by law the ability to 'abort' his rights in and obligations to the child. If a woman decides to keep the child the father may choose not to by severing all ties legally.

This same concept has been supported by a former president of the feminist organization National Organization for Women, attorney Karen DeCrow, who wrote that "if a woman makes a unilateral decision to bring pregnancy to term, and the biological father does not, and cannot, share in this decision, he should not be liable for 21 years of support...autonomous women making independent decisions about their lives should not expect men to finance their choice."

The legal concept was tried in Dubay v. Wells and was dismissed. This was not surprising, since legislation in the various jurisdictions currently sets forth guidelines for when child support is owed as well as its amount. Accordingly, legislation would be required to change the law to implement McCulley's concept.

== See also ==
- Bradley Amendment
- California Child Support Guideline Review
- Child Support
- Debtor's prison
- Wage slavery
- Filial responsibility laws, support money is paid from adult children to impoverished elders.
- Hermesmann v. Seyer
- Uniform Child Custody Jurisdiction And Enforcement Act
- Tax refund interception
