= Maintenance regulation =

Regulation of EU, determining which court has jurisdiction in the event of a conflict

Regulation (EC) No 4/2009
- European Union regulation
- Title: Council Regulation (EC) on jurisdiction, applicable law, recognition and enforcement of decisions and cooperation in matters relating to maintenance obligations
- Applicability: all EU Member States (in part except Denmark)
- Made by: European Council
- Made under: Article 61(c) and Article 67(2) TEC
- Journal reference: OJ L 7, 10 January 2009, pp 1–79

History
- Date made: 18 December 2008
- Entry into force: 30 January 2009
- Implementation date: 18 June 2011

The Maintenance Regulation (EC) No 4/2009, formally the Council Regulation (EC) on jurisdiction, applicable law, recognition and enforcement of decisions and cooperation in matters relating to maintenance obligations, is a European Union Regulation on conflict of law issues regarding maintenance obligations (e.g. alimony and child maintenance). The regulation governs which courts have jurisdiction and which law it should apply. It further governs the recognition and enforcement of decisions. The regulation amends the Brussels Regulation, which covers jurisdiction in legal disputes of a civil or commercial nature between individuals more broadly.

The content of the regulation is strongly aligned with the Hague Maintenance convention and the Hague Maintenance Protocol of 2007.

The member states of the European Union originally conclude a convention amongst themselves on maintenance payments, which was signed on 11 June 1990 but never entered into force as it was not ratified by all EU member states. The substance of this convention was replaced by the regulation, which originally applied directly to all member states except the United Kingdom and Denmark. The UK subsequently accepted the regulation, and was approved to participate by the Commission in June 2009. It applied to the UK until 1 January 2021 (the end of the transition period, following Brexit). Denmark has a full opt-out from implementing regulations under the area of freedom, security and justice. However, in 2005 Denmark signed an international agreement with the European Community to apply the provisions of the 2001 Brussels Regulation between the EU and Denmark. Denmark notified the Commission of its acceptance of the amendments to the Brussels Regulation made by the Maintenance regulation in January 2009. As such, it partially applies the maintenance regulation, in so far as it amends the Brussels regulation on jurisdiction.

== Jurisdiction ==
The regulation grants jurisdiction to

- The EU country where the defendant is habitually resident
- The EU country where the creditor (the -proposed- receiver of maintenance) is habitually resident
- The EU country responsible for determining the status of a person (if this is related to the maintenance question)
- The EU country where governing parental responsibility (if this is related to the maintenance decision)

Parties may however (in cases not involving children below 18) conclude an agreement giving (exclusive) jurisdiction to

- The EU nationality of one of the partners
- The EU country of habitual residence of one of the partners
- A non-EU country party to the Lugano convention (Iceland, Norway, Switzerland); subject to the requirements of the convention
- Their last common residence of over 1 year (in the EU; for spouses or former spouses only)
- The country governing the matrimonial regime (for spouses or former spouses only)

In addition, if a defendant appears in court proceedings in an EU country (while not disputing jurisdiction), then that court shall also have jurisdiction. If these rules do not grant jurisdiction to a Brussels regime (EU, Iceland, Norway, Switzerland) court, the court of the common nationality has jurisdiction. If also that is not possible, and if there is a connection to an EU member state, that state has jurisdiction in exceptional circumstances.

If multiple eligible EU courts are seized, then the court seized first, has jurisdiction, and all other courts have to stay proceedings.

== Applicable law ==
The law applicable to the maintenance proceedings is not automatically that of the chosen court (law of the forum). For the EU countries bound by the Hague Maintenance Protocol (all, except Denmark and the UK), the law of the creditor (the person obtaining maintenance) applies. However, in relations of parents to children, children to parents and by other persons towards persons below 21 (if they have never been spouses), the law of their common nationality or the law of the habitual residence of the debtor (the person who -is alleged to- owe maintenance) does apply. The parties may furthermore designate a law to apply -one of their nationalities, habitual residences, their property regime or divorce- except in cases regarding maintenance obligations towards vulnerable persons and children (under 18). In the case of Denmark and the United Kingdom, the applicable law is determined by their respective national laws.

== Applicability and scope ==
The differences and relationships between the Regulation, Convention, and the Protocol are shown below.

	Maintenance Regulation	Hague Convention	Hague Protocol
EU Applicability	European Union (partly excluding Denmark)	European Union (excluding Denmark)	European Union (excluding Denmark)
Non-EU	–	Albania, Brazail, Bosnia-Herzegovina, Guyana, Honduras, Kazakhstan, Montenegro, Nicaragua, Norway, Turkey, Ukraine, United Kingdom, United States	Brazil, Kazakhstan, Serbia
Entry into force	18 June 2011	1 January 2013; EU: 1 August 2014	1 August 2013; EU: Applied provisionally since 18 June 2011
Scope	All maintenance from family relationships	Child maintenance (can be extended to others)	All maintenance from family relationships
Jurisdiction provisions	yes	only for change of existing maintenance agreements	yes
Choice of law provisions	yes (for Protocol parties)	no	yes
Central authority system	yes (excl. Denmark)	yes	no

== See also ==
- Brussels II regulation (jurisdiction in other family law matters)
- Rome III (applicable law to divorce)
