= SDU =

Sdu or SDU may refer to:

== Communications ==
- Satellite Data Unit, a part of a satellite telecommunication system for aircraft
- Service Data Unit, a telecommunications term related to the layered protocol concept

== Universities ==
- University of Southern Denmark, Danish: Syddansk Universitet (SDU)
- Süleyman Demirel University, a university in Isparta, Turkey
- Suleyman Demirel University, a university in Almaty, Kazakhstan
- Shandong University (山东大学 SDU), a university in Shandong, China
- Sanda University (上海杉达学院 SDU), a university in Shanghai, China

== Other ==
- Single dwelling unit, a single-family, free-standing residential building (home). It is defined in opposition to a multi-family residential dwelling (e.g. apartment).
- Special Detective Unit, a specialist branch of the Garda Síochána, Ireland's national police
- Special Duties Unit, a paramilitary special force of the Hong Kong Police Force
- Surveillance Detection Unit, a surveillance program connected to US embassies.
- Santos Dumont Airport, the smaller of the two airports in Rio de Janeiro, Brazil (IATA code)
- SDU: Sex Duties Unit, a 2013 Hong Kong action comedy film
- Social Development Unit, a matchmaking agency in Singapore
- Social Democratic Union (disambiguation), a name of a number of political parties
- Sonic Diver Unit, special mecha unit piloted by the Sky Girls (Japanese anime)
- Sodium diuranate, a uranium salt that is an intermediate in the production of the metal
- Sdu (publishing company), a Dutch publishing company, formerly the Staatsdrukkerij en Uitgeverij
- Sweden Democratic Youth, the former youth league of the Swedish political party Sweden Democrats
- State Disbursement Unit, a government agency in the United States that handles child support payments
- NHS Sustainable Development Unit in the United Kingdom
