= FMEP =

FMEP may refer to:

- FMEP friction mean effective pressure
- British Columbia Family Maintenance Enforcement Program (FMEP)
- FMEP Pierrefonds Airport
- FMEP, extended play by Fireball Ministry
