= Robert Franco =

Robert Franco may refer to:

- Robert J. Franco (fl. 1980–1996), film set designer
- Robert Franco (skier) or Robby Franco (born 1993), American-Mexican freestyle skier

== See also ==
- Robert Franks (disambiguation)
- Robert Frank (disambiguation)
