= International matrimonial law =

International matrimonial law is an area of private international law (or conflict of laws in the United States). The area specifically deals with relations between spouses and former spouses on issues of marriage, divorce and child custody. In the last 50 years, the States Members of the Hague Conference on Private International Law have attempted to harmonize domestic matrimonial laws and judicial rulings across international borders in these areas.

== Marriage ==
=== Hague Marriage Convention ===
The Hague Convention that harmonizes different marriage laws, the Convention on the Celebration and Recognition of the Validity of Marriages, was concluded at The Hague on 14 March 1978 and entered into force on 1 May 1991. Article 9 of the Convention holds that, “A marriage validly entered into under the law of the State of celebration or which subsequently becomes valid under that law shall be considered as such in all Contracting States, subject to the provisions of this Chapter.” In short, one Contracting State must recognize a marriage legally performed in another contracting state. Currently only three states (Australia, Luxembourg, and the Netherlands) have ratified the Convention. Another three (Egypt, Finland, and Portugal) have signed it. One of the reasons that the Convention may have so few Contracting States is that states have long observed the principle of comity which has been defined in the United States as the “recognition that one nation allows within its territory to the legislative, executive or judicial acts of another nation, having due regard both to the international duty and convenience and to the rights of its own citizens who are under the protection of its laws.”

== Divorce ==
=== Hague Convention of 1970 ===
The Hague Convention that compels Contracting States to recognize divorces and legal separations obtained legally in another contracting state is the Hague Convention on the Recognition of Divorces and Legal Separations concluded on 1 June 1970 and entered into force 24 August 1975. Article 1 of the Convention states, “ The present Convention shall apply to the recognition in one Contracting State of divorces and legal separations obtained in another Contracting State which follow judicial or other proceedings officially recognized in that State and which are legally effective there.” The Convention makes clear that it does not apply to any determinations about property or child custody that may accompany a divorce. Only the state of being divorced or legally separated must be recognized. There are certain exceptions. According to the Convention a divorce need not be recognized if both parties were nationals of a state which did not provide for divorce at the time of the divorce (Article 7), if the respondent in a divorce proceeding was not given an adequate chance to present his or her case (Article 8), if to do so would be “incompatible” with a previous determination as to the status of the spouses in the State where they are seeking recognition (Article 9), or if to recognize such a divorce would be manifestly incompatible with the state's public policy (Article 10). In addition, Article 20 of the Constitution allows a Contracting State to file a reservation stating that that state will not recognize a divorce if at the date of the divorce, “one of the spouses was a national of a state whose laws did not provide for divorce.”

There are 19 states that are parties the Convention, all of which are in Europe. Many states, including the United States, which is not a Contracting State to the Convention, recognize divorces obtained abroad through the above-mentioned legal principle of comity. The convention also applies to Hong Kong, to which it was extended before its transfer from the United Kingdom to China.

=== Property Issues ===
As the Convention on the Recognition of Divorces and Legal Separations does not deal with matrimonial property in a divorce, the Hague Conference concluded a separate convention on 14 March 1978. The Convention on the Law Applicable to Matrimonial Property Regimes, which entered into force on 1 September 1992, allows spouses in a marriage to decide which jurisdiction's laws will apply to their property. The Convention provides that they may select the laws of any State of which one of the spouses is a national of at the time of selection, the laws of any state in which one of the spouses has his or her “habitual residence” at the time of selection, or the law of the first state in which one of the spouses establishes a new habitual residence after the marriage. If no such selection is made, the laws of the first state in which the couple had their habitual residence after marriage govern the property.

The convention has only been ratified by three states (France, Luxembourg, and the Netherlands) and signed by another two (Austria and Portugal). As such, international divorce cases that take place outside of the authority of the convention are not clear-cut. For instance, questions arise when assets are held in trust in a country that neither spouse has an actual connection to through residence or nationality and neither the state in which the trust is located nor the state in which suit is brought (the state of nationality or residence) is a member of the Convention. Some courts have found ways around the jurisdictional issue at hand (i.e. that they have no jurisdiction in another country) especially if the assets are marital and under the control of only one spouse. Such was the case in the New York case of Riechers v. Riechers. In this case the husband had used marital assets to fund a Cook Islands trust; even though the New York court had no jurisdiction over the trust money, they ordered the wife's share of that money paid from other assets.

=== The European Union ===
Not all efforts to deal with and harmonize the matrimonial aspects of private international law take place at the global level or amongst the members of the Hague Conference. The European Union has been moving towards a common divorce law. The European Commission promulgated the so-called Brussels II regulation in March 2001 in an effort to settle the conflict of laws relating to divorce between the members of the European Union. The regulation, amended in 2005, determines which courts will have jurisdiction over what matters. But even with this regulation, which binds all member states save Denmark, within the EU large differences in divorce laws exist. As one legal scholar has noted: “The substantive law pertaining to legal separation continues to differ widely between the Member States: from Maltese law where there is a prohibition of divorce to Finnish of Swedish law where no actual grounds of divorce are required.” In addition, legal culture in these countries is different on issues of divorce and marital property. Observers note that the generosity of settlements and alimony differ from state to state. With Brussels II holding that the first valid court to process a filing for divorce is the court that will have jurisdiction, it can matter a great deal where in the EU a ruling is made. This is true also in divorces that take place between a European Union citizen and a citizen of another country. High-profile divorce cases such as the one between American pop-star Madonna and her British husband Guy Ritchie, must deal with such issues, especially if one party stands to gain by filing in a certain jurisdiction. (In this case, Ritchie, who is comparatively less well off, would benefit from filing in Britain where settlements tend to be larger and alimony more generous).

Several EU countries have further harmonized their choice of law provisions regarding divorce in the European Union Divorce Law Pact, which entered into force in 2012. Also this regulation does not provide substantive law provisions.

== Child Custody ==
While the Hague Conference has not concluded any agreements specifically on the issue of child custody, it has dealt with two incidental issues: parental child abduction and child support (or maintenance) payments.

=== Parental Child Abduction ===
The Hague Convention on the Civil Aspects of International Child Abduction was concluded on 25 October 1980 and entered into force on 1 December 1983. Its goal is to provide that if a child is removed from his habitual residence and custodial status to another country, the child can be returned to the country of his habitual residence thus maintaining the custodial status quo prior to the removal.

One of the primary issues with this convention is the vagueness of the term “habitually resident.” Because the term is open to interpretation by national courts, the Convention is not necessarily applied uniformly amongst the Contracting States. For example, although a plain-text reading of the convention seems to support the notion that a child is habitually resident in the state he or she lived in prior to abduction, some courts have disagreed. For example, in the 2001 case of Mozes v. Mozes where the wife and children had travelled to the United States from Israel for a period of fifteen months with the consent of the father, during which time the wife obtained a divorce and temporary custody of the children in Los Angeles, the Ninth Circuit Court of Appeals ruled that habitual residence can change. It found that the United States had supplanted Israel as the children's habitual residence, rejecting the father's petition for return of the children under the convention.

There are also cases where the child may not be returned to the habitual residence. If the child is old enough and chooses to stay with the parent, they won't be forced to their habitual residence. A child might also not be forced to return if a year has passed since the child was taken out of the country by a parent or if he or she may be put in danger if returned.

=== Child Support ===
Among the more recent Hague conventions is the Convention on the International Recovery of Child Support and Other Forms of Family Maintenance concluded on 23 November 2007, which entered into force in 2013. This Convention complements the United Nations Convention on the Recovery Abroad of Maintenance of 1956. Child support was an area where comity was not always observed, even after the entry into force of the UN convention. There were few signatories of the convention and many people were able to avoid child support payments by moving overseas. The Hague Convention would attempt to solve this problem at least among the Contracting States. It would compel individuals who moved from one Contracting State to another to continue to remit payment by forcing the second Contracting State to enforce the child support agreement from the first. Currently the Convention has signed the entire European Union, plus Albania, Bosnia and Herzegovina, Norway, Ukraine and the United States . In the message he sent to the United States Senate asking them to ratify the treaty, United States President George W. Bush called on the body to act quickly citing the increasing number of 15 million US child support cases that involved “parties who live in different nations.”

== See also ==
- Conflict of laws
- International law
- Family law
- Hague Conference on Private International Law
