= Uniform Reciprocal Enforcement of Support Act =

The Uniform Reciprocal Enforcement of Support Act (URESA), passed in 1950, concerns interstate cooperation in the collection of spousal and child support. The law establishes procedures for enforcement in cases in which the person owing alimony or child support is in one state and the person to whom the support is owed is in another state (hence the word "reciprocal").

The original Act was first passed in 1950 by the National Conference of Commissioners on Uniform State Laws. It was amended in 1952 and again in 1958. The most recent amendments were enacted in 1968 and included improved machinery for finding the person owing support; guidelines for the conduct of the trial in the responding state; guidelines for cases where paternity is in question or where there has been interference with visitation rights; and simplified procedures for registering and enforcing out-of-state support orders. Such acts, substantially similar in content, have been passed in all 50 states.

== Full faith and credit applicability ==
Child support is established in proceedings in which the court has personal jurisdiction over both parties, i.e. the mother and father. For post-divorce obligations, this may be the inter parte divorce proceeding itself, where the issues implicate res judicata and are entitled to full faith and credit. Under Article 4 of the United States Constitution, "Full faith and credit shall be given in each state to the public acts, records, and judicial proceedings of every other state." Courts therefore may use the full-faith-and-credit article to enforce final judgments that have been entered by the courts of another state.

When a judgment is not final, there is a problem of giving full faith and credit to that judgment in another state. The Second Restatement states, under the topic of Defenses to Recognition and Enforcement, that a judgment rendered in one state need not be recognized or enforced in another state insofar as the judgment remains subject to modification in the state of rendition either as to sums that have accrued and are unpaid or as to sums that will accrue in the future. A court is free to recognize or enforce a judgment that remains subject to modification under the local law of the state of rendition. Child support orders are modifiable based on changing circumstances, and are therefore not final.

Under full faith and credit, the local law of the state of rendition will be applied to determine whether the judgment is modifiable and, if so, in what respects. This law will determine whether the judgment is modifiable with respect to past due installments and with respect to future installments. As between states, full faith and credit requires application of the local law of the state of rendition to determine whether the judgment is modifiable and, if so, in what respects.

== Uniform Reciprocal Enforcement of Support Act (URESA) ==
In 1910, the National Conference of Commissions on Uniform State Laws approved the Uniform Desertion and Non-Support Act. The act made it a punishable offense for a spouse to desert, willfully neglect, or refuse to provide for the support and maintenance of the other spouse in destitute or necessitous circumstances, or for a parent to fail in the same duty to their child less than 16 years of age. The 1910 act sought to improve the enforcement of the duties of support, but it did not take into account husbands, wives, fathers, and mothers who fled the original jurisdiction. With the increasing mobility of the population, welfare departments had to support the destitute families because the extradition process was inefficient and often unsuccessful.

In 1950, The National Conference of Commissions on Uniform State Laws published the Uniform Reciprocal Enforcement of Support Act (URESA). The Commission stated that, "The purposes of this act are to improve and extend by reciprocal legislation the enforcement of duties of support and to make uniform the law with respect thereto." URESA contained both civil and criminal provisions designed to enforce child support laws that were already passed by state legislatures. The criminal enforcement section focused on making extradition easier, the procedures for which relied upon the obligee state demanding that the obligor state extradite the obligor to the obligee state, or for the obligor to submit himself/herself to the jurisdiction of the obligee state. The civil enforcement section was much more detailed, imposing duties on both the responding and initiating states. These provisions relied upon a system where the obligee would initiate proceedings in his/her state, then the initiating state would determine if the obligor had a duty of support. If the initiating court held that the obligor had a duty of support, the initiating court would forward the case to the obligor's state. The responding state, which would have personal jurisdiction over the obligor, would provide notice and a hearing for obligor. After this hearing, the responding court would enforce the support order. By 1955, all 48 states and several U.S. territories had adopted either URESA or the Uniform Support of Dependents Law, making recovery for nonsupport much easier and routine.

== Revised Uniform Reciprocal Enforcement of Support Act (RURESA) ==
In 1968, the Commission on Uniform State Laws again amended URESA, which later became known as the Revised Uniform Reciprocal Enforcement of Support Act (RURESA). The amendments involved two important changes to URESA. First, the amendments sought to correct a problem created by URESA where the responding court would only have evidence from the obligor and not have any evidence from the initiating state or the obligee. The responding court with one-sided representation would hold for the obligor; thus, the result would not serve the purpose of URESA. The Commission's solution was to amend URESA so that the initiating state and the obligee would provide evidence to be sent to the responding court along with the case file. The initiating court presented to the responding court evidence of the obligee's case, so the responding court would have both representations of the case. Second, the Commission provided a second method for obtaining redress under the category of civil enforcement. The new method provided for the obligee to register the foreign support order in a court of the obligor's state, and present that case directly to the foreign court.

RURESA provided new protection for obligees against noncompliant obligors; however, RURESA created the problem of multiple support orders. Since every state could enforce and modify a support order, the possibility of having multiple support orders arose. If the obligor moved from State A to State B to State C to State D, and if the obligee continually registered and had the order modified, then there would be four separate and independent support orders. RURESA provided that the state courts could modify the original order so long as the court applied its own procedural law and the substantive law of the original state, unless that application of substantive law contravened its own public policy. The Commission intended to correct the problem of inconsistent multiple orders by only allowing the support orders to be modified based upon a single state's law. In theory, states A, B and C could only modify a support order based upon the original state's law; thus, all the support orders should be identical. In practice, however, this rule created ambiguities concerning whether child support guidelines are procedural or substantive, and if substantive, whether application of that substantive law contravenes some public policy. Therefore, it became possible that there could be multiple orders based upon different states' child support guidelines.

== URESA and the Uniform Interstate Family Support Act ==
URESA provided additional procedures for the deserted spouse. applying both to the enforcement of support orders and to original claims for support. Its procedures enabled the claimant to file in the local forum, which forwarded the complaint to the state where the defendant was present. The court of the second state then exercised personal jurisdiction over the defendant and entered the appropriate support order. Particularly important was the act's choice-of-law provision stating that the support obligation was to be determined according to the law of the state where the defendant was present at and during the time for which support is claimed.

In 1992, the National Conference of Commissioners of Uniform State Laws approved the Uniform Interstate Family Support Act (UIFSA) to update and replace URESA. Since 1992, UIFSA has been enacted by all 50 states; while some states completely repealed URESA, some states retained aspects of URESA, and some states retained the entirety of URESA.

== See also ==
- List of Uniform Acts (United States)
