= Death of a Salesman (1985 film) =

1985 film by Volker Schlöndorff

- Poster
- Genre: Tragedy
- Based on: Death of a Salesman (1949 play) by Arthur Miller
- Written by: Arthur Miller
- Directed by: Volker Schlöndorff
- Starring: Dustin Hoffman; Kate Reid; John Malkovich; Stephen Lang; Charles Durning
- Music by: Alex North
- Country of origin: United States
- Original language: English

Production
- Producer: Robert F. Colesberry
- Production locations: Kaufman Astoria Studios, New York, U.S.
- Cinematography: Michael Ballhaus
- Editors: David Ray; Mark Burns
- Running time: 136 minutes
- Production companies: Roxbury Productions; Punch Productions

Original release
- Network: CBS
- Release: September 15, 1985

Death of a Salesman is a 1985 American tragedy television film directed by Volker Schlöndorff, adapted from Arthur Miller's 1949 play. It stars Dustin Hoffman as Willy Loman, Kate Reid as Linda, John Malkovich as Biff, Stephen Lang as Happy, and Charles Durning as Charley. The film is based upon the 1984 Broadway revival, and features the same principal cast. It closely follows Miller's original stage script, with only minor differences.

The film premiered on CBS September 15, 1985. It earned 10 nominations at the 38th Primetime Emmy Awards ceremony, and four Golden Globe nominations at the 43rd Golden Globe Awards ceremony, winning three and one, respectively.

== Plot ==
Willy Loman returns home exhausted after a canceled business trip. Worried over Willy's state of mind and recent car crash, his wife Linda suggests that he asks his boss Howard Wagner to allow him to work in his home city so he will not have to travel anymore. Willy complains to Linda that their son Biff, who is visiting, has yet to be successful in life. Despite Biff's promise as an athlete in high school, he flunked senior year math and never went to college.

Willy is prone to frequent flashbacks in which he sees events and figures from his past, such as his long-deceased older brother Ben, Willy's idol. Unable to distinguish between his memories and present-day reality, he speaks to the people in his flashbacks as if they were real, startling those around him. Biff and his brother Happy, who is also visiting, discuss their father's mental degradation while reminiscing about their childhood together. When Willy walks in, angry that the two boys have never amounted to anything, Biff and Happy tell Willy that Biff plans to make a business proposition the next day in an effort to pacify their father.

The next day, Willy goes to ask Howard for a job in town, and Biff goes to make a business proposition, but neither are successful. Willy gets angry, and ends up getting fired when Howard tells him that he needs a rest and can no longer represent the company. Biff waits hours to see a former employer who does not remember him and turns him down. As a result of this, Biff impulsively steals a fountain pen. Then, Willy goes to the office of his neighbor Charley, where he runs into Charley's son Bernard (now a successful lawyer). Bernard tells him that Biff originally intended to go to summer school to salvage his academic and athletic career after flunking math, but when Biff made an emergency trip to Boston to seek help from Willy, who was then on a sales trip, something occurred there that changed Biff's mind.

Happy, Biff and Willy meet for dinner at a restaurant, but Willy refuses to hear bad news from Biff. Happy tries to get Biff to lie to their father, but Biff opposes this and attempts to tell him what happened. Willy, then, begins to become angry and slips into a flashback of what happened in Boston the day Biff came to see him. Willy had been in a hotel on a sales trip with a young woman named Miss Francis when Biff unexpectedly arrived and realized that Willy was cheating on his wife, Linda. From that moment, Biff's view of his father, and all of his father's cherished hopes and dreams for him, changed irrevocably, setting Biff adrift.

Biff leaves the restaurant in frustration, followed by Happy and two girls, Miss Forsythe and Letta, who Happy has picked up. They leave a confused and upset Willy behind in the restaurant restroom. When they return home later, their mother angrily confronts them for abandoning their father, while Willy talks to himself outside. Biff goes outside to try reconciling with Willy. The discussion quickly escalates into another argument, at which point Biff forcefully tries to convey to his father that he is not meant for anything great; that he is simply ordinary, insisting they both are. Willy cannot accept this and insists that he is "not a dime a dozen." The feud culminates with Biff hugging Willy, crying as he tries to get his father to let go of the unrealistic dreams he still carries for him. He wants instead for Willy to finally accept him for who he really is. He also tells his father he loves him.

Rather than listen to what Biff actually says, Willy realizes that his son has forgiven him, and thinks Biff will now pursue a career as a businessman. Willy — with encouragement from Ben, with whom he interacts in one of his flashbacks — kills himself by intentionally crashing his car so that Biff can use the life insurance money to start his business. However, at the funeral, Biff retains his belief that he does not want to become a businessman. Happy, on the other hand, chooses to follow in his father's footsteps.

== Cast ==
- Dustin Hoffman as Willy Loman
- Kate Reid as Linda Loman
- John Malkovich as Biff Loman
- Stephen Lang as Happy Loman
- Charles Durning as Charley
- David S. Chandler as Bernard
- Louis Zorich as Ben Loman
- Kathy Rossetter as the Woman from Boston
- Jon Polito as Howard Wagner
- Anne McIntosh as Jenny
- Tom Signorelli as Stanley
- Linda Kozlowski as Ms. Forsythe
- Karen Needle as Letta
- Michael Quinlan as Waiter

== Reception ==
=== Critical response ===
On review aggregation website Rotten Tomatoes, 100% of 11 reviews are positive, with an average rating of 8.2 out of 10.

=== Awards and nominations ===
Year	Award	Category	Nominee(s)	Result	Ref.
1986	Golden Globe Awards	Best Miniseries or Motion Picture Made for Television		Nominated	
1986	Golden Globe Awards	Best Actor in a Miniseries or Motion Picture Made for Television	Dustin Hoffman	Won	
1986	Golden Globe Awards	Best Supporting Actor in a Series, Miniseries or Motion Picture Made for Television	John Malkovich	Nominated	
1986	Golden Globe Awards	Best Supporting Actress in a Series, Miniseries or Motion Picture Made for Television	Kate Reid	Nominated	
1986	Primetime Emmy Awards	Outstanding Drama/Comedy Special	Arthur Miller, Dustin Hoffman, and Robert F. Colesberry	Nominated	
1986	Primetime Emmy Awards	Outstanding Lead Actor in a Miniseries or a Special	Dustin Hoffman	Won	
1986	Primetime Emmy Awards	Outstanding Supporting Actor in a Miniseries or a Special	Charles Durning	Nominated	
1986	Primetime Emmy Awards	Outstanding Supporting Actor in a Miniseries or a Special	John Malkovich	Won	
1986	Primetime Emmy Awards	Outstanding Directing in a Miniseries or a Special	Volker Schlöndorff	Nominated	
1986	Primetime Emmy Awards	Outstanding Art Direction for a Miniseries or a Special	Tony Walton, John Kasarda, and Robert J. Franco	Won	
1986	Primetime Emmy Awards	Outstanding Costume Design for a Miniseries or a Special	Ruth Morley	Nominated	
1986	Primetime Emmy Awards	Outstanding Editing for a Miniseries or a Special – Single Camera Production	David Ray	Nominated	
1986	Primetime Emmy Awards	Outstanding Achievement in Music Composition for a Miniseries or a Special (Dramatic Underscore)	Alex North	Nominated	
1986	Primetime Emmy Awards	Outstanding Sound Mixing for a Miniseries or a Special	Tom Fleischman	Nominated	
1986	Television Critics Association Awards	Program of the Year		Won (Note: Tied with The Vanishing Family: Crisis in Black America.)	
1986	Television Critics Association Awards	Outstanding Achievement in Drama		Won	

== Home media ==
The film was released on DVD January 28, 2003, by Image Entertainment. A Blu-ray edition by Shout! Factory was released November 15, 2016.
