= Robert Franks =

Robert Franks may refer to:

- Bobby Franks (1909–1924), American murder victim of Leopold and Loeb
- Bob Franks (1951–2010), U.S. Representative from New Jersey
- Robert Franks (basketball) (born 1996), American basketball player

== See also ==
- Robert Frank (disambiguation)
- Robert Franco (disambiguation)
