= New Hire Registry =

The New Hire Registry is a program established in the United States pursuant to the Personal Responsibility and Work Opportunity Reconciliation Act (PRWORA) of 1996, 42 U.S.C. 653a, which required each state, the District of Columbia, and the Federal Government for its own employees, to establish - or contract with a provider to operate - a system where all new hires by any employer must be reported to a state-established New Hire Registry for that state. All employers of employees for wages have been required since 1997 to register with their state for reporting, and to report new hires within 20 days of employment, except employers who file new hire reports electronically, who must file a report every 12 to 16 days. The ostensible purpose of the program is to check for "deadbeat parents", e.g. persons not paying required child support orders, but may also be used for abuse of other payment-related programs such as unemployment insurance.

== Who is required to comply ==
All employers of employees for wages, including a labor union, must register with their state's New Hire Registry, and are required to report to the registry all new hires or all rehires of former employees who have been separated from the employer for more than 60 days. All employees must be reported, including employees who were hired or worked for less than one day, and seasonal employees. Domestic employees such as a maid, gardener, cook, etc., must be reported if paid more than $1,000 in a calendar quarter. The law's reporting requirements strictly include all employees for wages. An employer must report all persons who would be considered employees under federal rules for withholding of employment taxes to the state's New Hire Registry.

Federal law does not mandate reporting of independent contractors, but is encouraged. Some states, however, require reporting of independent contractors pursuant to State Law.

Federal Government agencies may either report employees to the national registry, or to the state registry of where the agency is located.

While reporting of employees who are no longer working for the employer may not seem to be helpful, since the report includes the address of the employee, it may be useful in tracking down an employee who has unpaid child support payments or might be committing unemployment insurance fraud.

== Exemptions ==
No employer is exempt from reporting new hires, with the exception of (1) Employees of Federally Recognized Indian Tribes (as the employer has Tribal Sovereignty) and (2) Federal intelligence agencies where the director of the agency has determined that reporting may jeopardize the safety of certain employees or may compromise National Security.

== Report Format ==
The report which is required to be filed includes the name, address and social security number of every new hire, as well as the name, address, and Federal Employer Identification Number of the employer, for each new hire made within the last 20 days or within the last two weeks for employers filing electronically.

== Single State vs. Multistate Employers ==
An employer within a single state files with the New Hire Registry of the state where they operate.

Multistate employers not filing electronically may choose to either file new hire reports with each state where the employee works, or instead may file a single combined report for all employees for all states where it operates with one state's New Hire Registry, but must not make both reports. Multistate employers who file electronically must pick one state, file all reports with that state, and notify all other states where they operate to which state they are reporting.

== Requirement of States operating the Registry ==
States are required to check for domestic child support orders that a parent is not collecting, and if a person is found, to send an order to the person's employer to withhold at each paycheck the amount of unpaid prior child support, up to a maximum of 50% of the employee's salary, until all outstanding child support orders have been paid.

== Non-compliance penalties ==
Failure of the employer to file the report is subject to a penalty of $20 per report not filed, unless the employer conspired with the employee to not file, in which the penalty is $500 per report not filed.
