= 2nd TCA Awards =

US television awards ceremony in 1986

- Date: June 10, 1986
- Venue: Beverly Wilshire Hotel, Los Angeles, California

Highlights
- Program of the Year: Death of a Salesman and The Vanishing Family: Crisis in Black America

The 2nd TCA Awards were presented by the Television Critics Association. The ceremony was held on June 10, 1986, at the Beverly Wilshire Hotel in Los Angeles, Calif.

== Winners and nominees ==
Category	Winner	Other Nominees
Program of the Year	Death of a Salesman (CBS) and The Vanishing Family: Crisis in Black America (CBS)	Anne of Green Gables (PBS); The Cosby Show (NBC); An Early Frost (NBC)
Outstanding Achievement in Comedy	The Cosby Show (NBC)	Cheers (NBC); The Golden Girls (NBC); Moonlighting (ABC); Newhart (CBS)
Outstanding Achievement in Drama	Death of a Salesman (CBS)	Anne of Green Gables (PBS); An Early Frost (NBC); Love Is Never Silent (NBC); Nobody's Child (CBS); St. Elsewhere (NBC)
Outstanding Achievement in Specials	Live Aid (ABC/MTV)	Comic Relief (HBO); Horowitz in Moscow (CBS); Kennedy Center Honors (CBS); Putting It Together: The Making of The Broadway Album (HBO)
Outstanding Achievement in Children's Programming	WonderWorks (PBS)	Jim Henson; ABC Afterschool Special (ABC); The Disney Sunday Movie (ABC); Mister Rogers' Neighborhood (PBS); Sesame Street (PBS)
Outstanding Achievement in News and Information	Ted Koppel - Nightline (ABC) and Bill Moyers - The Vanishing Family: Crisis in Black America (CBS)	CNN
Outstanding Achievement in Sports	No award given	1985 World Series (ABC); Roone Arledge; John Madden; Monday Night Football (ABC); Wide World of Sports (ABC)
Career Achievement Award	Walter Cronkite	Roone Arledge; Bill Moyers; Brandon Tartikoff; David L. Wolper

=== Multiple wins ===
The following shows received multiple wins:

Wins	Recipient
2	Death of a Salesman
2	The Vanishing Family: Crisis in Black America

=== Multiple nominations ===
The following shows received multiple nominations:

Nominations	Recipient
2	Anne of Green Gables
2	The Cosby Show
2	Death of a Salesman
2	An Early Frost
2	The Vanishing Family: Crisis in Black America
