= The Vanishing Family =

1986 CBS television documentary

The Vanishing Family: Crisis in Black America is a CBS News special report hosted by Bill Moyers that aired in January 1986. It explores changes in African-American family structure at a time when 60% of Black children were born to single mothers.

The Vanishing Family received numerous awards and widespread acclaim from newspaper columnists. Its influence led Sen. Bill Bradley (D–NJ) to introduce the Bradley Amendment, which since its passage in 1986 has enforced the provision of child support.

== Summary ==
Moyers interviews several unwed Black mothers in Newark, New Jersey and explores the dynamics of their families. The special also includes a discussion about social welfare programs. The program includes commentary from Dr. George Jackson of Howard University, Rev. Jesse Jackson, Georgetown University Professor of Law Eleanor Holmes Norton, and Harvard University Professor of Political Economics Glenn Loury.

== Reception ==
At a time when The Cosby Show was the most watched show on television, The Vanishing Family presented a radically different image of Black American families to the American public. The special was immediately controversial and received numerous awards.

The Christian Science Monitor described The Vanishing Family as "a hard-hitting news special" on "the current state of the black family in America." The New York Times noted that the special had "no negative racial stereotypes" and praised it as using "intelligence and grace" to describe its subjects.

The Vanishing Family won an Alfred I. duPont–Columbia University Award Gold Baton for excellence in broadcast journalism. It won Program of the Year and Outstanding Achievement in News and Information at the 2nd TCA Awards. The special won a Peabody Award in 1986. The special also won the Hillman Prize and the Humanitas Prize.

Angela Davis wrote an essay criticizing The Vanishing Family, arguing that there was a flaw in the statistic that impelled the report. In Women, Culture & Politics, she attributed the percentage of black children born to single mothers to the low, and declining, number of married black women having children.

== Legacy ==
Authors Kathryn Edin and Timothy J. Nelson credit The Vanishing Family with the introduction of the Bradley Amendment, a legislative amendment that prohibits retroactive reduction of child support obligations.

Bob Ehrlich sees The Vanishing Family as validating the concerns from Daniel Patrick Moynihan, whose 1965 publication The Negro Family: The Case for National Action had attracted criticism.
