= Robert Frank (disambiguation) =

Robert Frank (1924–2019) was an important figure in American photography and film.

Robert Frank may also refer to:

- Robert Frank (cricketer) (1864–1950), English first class cricketer
- Robert Frank (sculptor) (1902–1975), Swiss sculptor
- Robert Frank (SS officer) (1910–1944), German officer, Knight’s Cross recipient
- Robert H. Frank (born 1945), American economist
- Robert G. Frank (born 1952), American psychologist and academic administrator
- Robert Frank (table tennis) (born 1990), Australian table tennis player
- Whizzer (Robert Frank), a Golden Age comic book character
- Nuklo or Robert Frank Jr., a comic book character appearing in Marvel Comics

== See also ==
- Bob Franke (1947–2025), American singer-songwriter
- Robert Franco (disambiguation)
- Robert Franks (disambiguation)
