= Law applicable to divorce and legal separation regulation =

European agreement about cross-border divorces

Regulation (EU) No. 1259/2010
- European Union regulation
- Text adopted under the Enhanced cooperation procedure
- Title: Regulation implementing enhanced cooperation in the area of the law applicable to divorce and legal separation
- Applicability: Austria; Belgium; Bulgaria; Estonia; France; Germany; Greece; Hungary; Italy; Latvia; Lithuania; Luxembourg; Malta; Portugal; Romania; Slovenia; Spain
- Made by: Council of the European Union
- Made under: Article 81(3) of the TFEU
- Journal reference: L343, 20 December 2010, pp. 10-16

History
- Date made: 20 December 2010
- Entry into force: 21 June 2012

EU countries participating EU countries not participating

The European Union Divorce Law Pact or Rome III Regulation, formally Council Regulation (EU) No. 1259/2010 of 20 December 2010 implementing enhanced cooperation in the area of the law applicable to divorce and legal separation is a regulation concerning the applicable law regarding divorce valid in 17 countries. The regulation dictates which law should be used in cross-border divorces, while which courts should be used is determined by the Brussels II Regulation, which is valid for all European Union countries, except Denmark. The agreement, approved by Council of the European Union on 20 December 2010, took effect in the 14 original contracting parties on 21 June 2012 and makes use of the enhanced co-operation mechanism which allows a minimum of nine EU member states to establish advanced integration or cooperation in an area within EU structures but without all members being involved.

== History ==
The European Union has been moving towards a common applicable law provisions for divorce law. The European Commission promulgated the Brussels II regulation in March 2001 to settle which court of an EU member state was competent to hear cases related to divorce between the members of the European Union. This regulation, amended in 2005, determines which courts will have jurisdiction over what matters. But this regulation, which binds all member states save Denmark, does not address which law EU courts should use, and due to the large diversity in divorce laws in the EU, the results may vary strongly depending on which law is used. As one legal scholar noted: “The substantive law pertaining to legal separation continues to differ widely between the Member States: from Maltese law where there is a prohibition of divorce to Finnish of Swedish law where no actual grounds of divorce are required.” In addition, the law and legal culture in these countries varies on issues of divorce and marital property. Observers note that the generosity of settlements and alimony differ from state to state. With Brussels II holding that the first valid court to process a filing for divorce is the court that will have jurisdiction, and without a regulation on which law is used, it can matter a great deal where in the EU a ruling is made.

== Enhanced co-operation ==
With the rise in cross border divorce in the EU, common rules were put forward to settle the issue of where and under which law trans-national couples can divorce in the EU. However Sweden blocked the new rules, fearing their impact on the applicability of its liberal divorce law (divorce law differs strongly, with Nordic liberalism being in contrast to more conservative countries with more complicated procedures such as Malta which has only recently permitted it). In order to allow those willing states to proceed without Sweden, in July 2008 nine countries put forward a proposal to use enhanced cooperation: Austria, France, Greece, Hungary, Italy, Luxembourg, Romania, Slovenia and Spain. Belgium, Germany, Lithuania and Portugal were considering joining them.

At a meeting of the justice ministers on 25 July 2008, the nine states decided to formally seek the measure of enhanced cooperation; eight states (the nine states above minus France) formally requested it from the European Commission on 28 July 2008. On 24 March 2010, when the law was formally proposed by the commission, Bulgaria was the tenth state to join the aforementioned eight and France. Belgium, Germany and Latvia formally joined them on 28 May 2010, while Greece withdrew.

MEPs backed the proposal in June 2010 with 14 states willing to adopt enter the proposed cooperation: Austria, Belgium, Bulgaria, France, Germany, Hungary, Italy, Latvia, Luxembourg, Malta, Portugal, Romania, Slovenia and Spain. These states were then authorised by the Council to proceed with enhanced cooperation on 12 July 2010. Following the adoption of Council Regulation (EU) No. 1259/2010 on 20 December 2010, the new Regulation, known as the Rome III Regulation, took effect in the 14 participating states on 21 June 2012. Other EU Member state are permitted to sign up to the pact at a later date. Lithuania became the first state to request to join the enhanced co-operation on divorce law in June 2012, and their participation was approved by the Commission on 21 November 2012. The provisions of the agreement applied to Lithuania as of 22 May 2014. Greece submitted a request to participate in the regulation in October 2013, and the Commission granted their approval on 27 January 2014 making it the 16th country to join the regulation, which applied to Greece as of 29 July 2015. Estonia's participation was approved by the Commission in August 2016, and the regulation applied to the country as of 11 February 2018.

== Content ==
The applicable law is determined based on a number of criteria. If a higher ranked criterion is not applicable the evaluation moves one lower. The main criteria for the choice of law are

1. The choice of the couple (choosing from the law of one of their nationalities, their current or previous place of residence, or the law of the court being used)
2. The place of their residence
3. Their last place of residence (maximum 1 year ago, 1 of the spouses should still live there)
4. Their nationality
5. The law of the court being used (lex fori)

In case a separation is not possible within the determined law according to the scheme (for example in case of divorce of a same sex couple), the law of the court seized applies. The regulation is also applicable to legal separation and conversion of legal separation to divorce.
