= British Columbia Family Maintenance Enforcement Program =

The BC Family Maintenance Enforcement Program (FMEP) is a provincial government service established by the British Columbia Ministry of Justice in 1988. The program monitors and enforces maintenance orders and agreements for child support and spousal support. Annually, the program assists approximately 45,000 families, 58,000 children and collects and disburses over $200 million (CAD) in maintenance payments each year.

The Canadian courts recognize the ongoing financial responsibility of separated spouses to their children and to each other and regularly issue maintenance orders, which are court orders requiring one party (the payor) to provide payments to another party (the recipient) for the support of the children and/or the other party. By providing services to both payors and recipients, the FMEP ensures that the terms of these maintenance orders are fulfilled. The FMEP's services are available on an opt-in basis to most parents who live in British Columbia and who have valid maintenance orders or agreements filed with any court in Canada, the United States, or in other countries with which British Columbia has reciprocal agreements.

== Legislative Authority ==
Federal and provincial legislation, including the Family Maintenance Enforcement Act (the Act) and the Family Law Act provide the FMEP with authority to enforce maintenance payments. Under the Family Maintenance Enforcement Act, the FMEP is responsible for monitoring and enforcing all maintenance orders and agreements that are filed with the program.

== Services ==
Both payors and recipients have the option of enrolling in the FMEP, although, it only requires one party to enroll both. There is no cost for the program's services but default fees and interest charges apply if support payments are not made on time. While many maintenance payments are made on time, clients often register with the FMEP with the goal of having a third party track payments. If a payment is not made, the FMEP contacts the payor to request voluntary compliance and to make a plan for payment of arrears.

If payors fail to comply with maintenance payments, the FMEP will issue administrative enforcement as well as court enforcement to ensure collection of unpaid maintenance. Administrative enforcement actions include Notices of Attachment, which require the garnishment of wages and other sources of income or the interception of federal payments (such as employment insurance benefits and income tax returns), reporting arrears to the credit bureau, refusing to issue or renew a payor's driver's license, and placing a lien on a payor's land or personal property. Court enforcement mechanisms involve requiring a payor to attend in court to explain the non-payment of maintenance and, ultimately, incarceration for the willful failure to pay court ordered maintenance. Cases are assessed individually in order to determine which type of enforcement is appropriate. This decision depends on factors such as the payor's history and the amount of money owed. Under section 11.1 of the Act, the FMEP has the authority to charge payors interest on late and unpaid maintenance. This interest goes to the recipient.

Most of the payors and recipients enrolled in the FMEP live in British Columbia, although, out of the current caseload there are approximately 8,400 cases where one parent lives outside British Columbia. These cases involve cooperation with maintenance programs in other Canadian jurisdictions, as well as with international partners, to collect and disburse maintenance payments. The province of Alberta accounts for more than 50% of the program's out-of-province cases in Canada, while the State of Washington accounts for one third of the FMEP's reciprocal cases with the United States.

== Administration ==
The Director of Maintenance Enforcement manages the Family Maintenance Enforcement Program. The Director is a civil servant appointed by the Minister of Justice and Attorney General and acting in a position established by the Act.

== Clients ==
The FMEP monitors child support for just over 58,000 children. Almost one third of the children on the FMEP caseload are 11 years of age and under, and one in four children is over 19 years of age. The percentage of older children on the FMEP caseload reflects the widespread need for ongoing financial support from parents through high school and post-secondary school. Most parents registered with the FMEP are in their early 40s; the average age of payors is 45, and the average recipient age is 43.

== Payments and Disbursement ==
The average child support order registered with the program requires payment of just under $400 per month. Following registration, payors are required to send all maintenance payments to the FMEP, rather than send payments directly to the recipient. Payors are encouraged to make payments electronically. Payments are recorded by the FMEP and then disbursed to recipients, usually on the same day they are received. Payments are disbursed to recipients through direct deposit to bank accounts. An average of just under 43,000 payments per month are processed by the FMEP.

As an incentive for prompt payment, where a payor misses or is late making a payment twice in a calendar year, the program charges a default fee. The fee is equal to one month's maintenance up to a maximum of $400 and is paid to the provincial government. These fees help offset the costs of the FMEP, and together with funds collected for clients in receipt of income assistance, help to ensure that the FMEP is a cost-neutral program for the government. In 2015-16 just under $1.3 million was collected in default fees.

== Program Costs ==
The FMEP is a very cost efficient program. The total funding for the FMEP in 2015-2016 was $18 million which translates to $1 spent for every $11.67 collected.
