= Tax refund interception =

Forcible use of a tax refund to pay an outstanding obligation

A tax refund interception (also referred to as a tax refund offset) is the act of an agency responsible for sending tax refunds using all or part of a refund to fulfill an obligation of the taxpayer rather than sending the money to the taxpayer him/herself.

Some common obligations for which tax refunds are intercepted include student loans, child support, fines, restitution, and wage garnishments; however this is usually done if said debts are in considerable arrears. Debtors who have been making agreed payments on the dot are usually not subject to this as creditors often feel interception unnecessary. It can take years for an agency to initiate Tax intercept. While taxes are sometimes intercepted to pay off the balance to a government-operated collection agency, few jurisdictions allow refunds to be intercepted to pay a private collection agency.

In the United States, the Internal Revenue Code allows the Internal Revenue Service (IRS) to divert overpayments of taxes to satisfy other federal taxes, certain past-due support obligations, debts owed to other Federal agencies, state income tax obligations, county taxes, local taxes and unemployment compensation debts. Unlike private debts, refund interception for the said taxation will often occur even if prompt prior payments were made.

In many cases, the Department of Revenue (DOR) has the authority to intercept state tax refunds or refundable credits to repay debts owed to government agencies. Tax refunds may be intercepted to repay debts that are owed to the DOR, child support debts, court ordered restitution debts, debts owed to state or local governments, debts owed to the IRS or federal government, or debts owed across states. If one disagrees with the interception of their refund, then contacting the DOR is the best way to dispute the interception.

Tax refunds are intercepted with the purpose of forcing citizens to comply to their required debts. If one has student loan payments, child support payments, or worker's compensation payments that they have not fulfilled, then their refund will be intercepted and put towards the payments of those obligations.

In order for a debt to be permitted for interception it must: Be a debt greater than or equal to $100 in value. Be owed to a claimant agency that is legally obliged or contractually obligated to collect said debt. Be owed through contract, tort, or some other operation of the law.

When a tax refund has been intercepted, the debtor will receive a notice from the treasury departments Financial Management Service (FMS) that the interception has occurred. This notice will contain information on the original tax refund amount and how much was offset in the interception. It will also contain information on what agency is intercepting the refund along with information on how to contact that agency.

In cases where one feels that their tax refund has been wrongfully intercepted, there are some options for the interception to be appealed. For example, if one has divorced their spouse then the debt is no longer theirs to pay and a copy of your divorce paperwork should be sent to the intercepting agency. In cases where there are disputes, but no direct paperwork to prove ones cause, then it is best to contact the internal revenue service or the other collecting agency directly.

There are other miscellaneous sources of income that are subject to interception. For example lottery winnings and state issued vendor payments may be intercepted if they are over a certain amount of money.

== See also ==
- Garnishment
