= State Disbursement Unit =

In the United States, a State Disbursement Unit (SDU) is a state government agency that collects and disburses child support payments from one parent to the other.

States are required to establish as State Disbursement Unit by federal law, specifically Title 45 of the Code of Federal Regulations.

== Tasks ==
SDUs do not determine child support payments, this happens in court. The court also decides whether child support is to be paid directly to the receiving parent, or via the responsible SDU. The main tasks of a SDU are:

- collecting payments from the parent required to pay support - usually either by direct payment or by directing the parent's employer to withhold the payments from their wages
- in some cases, deducting money to recollect state welfare paid previously to the receiving parent
- distributing the money to the receiving parent
- keeping track of the money received and disbursed, to aid all parties in determining whether payments were made and disbursed correctly
