= NHS Sustainable Development Unit =

British government agency

Agency overview
- Formed: 2008
- Dissolved: July 2022
- Jurisdiction: England
- Headquarters: Cambridge, England
- Minister responsible: Minister of State for Health
- Agency executives: Sonia Roschnik, Director; Jerome Baddley, Head of Unit
- Website: www.england.nhs.uk/greenernhs/whats-already-happening/sustainable-development-unit-archive/

The Sustainable Development Unit (SDU) was a British government agency with the purpose of embedding the principles of sustainable development, social value and the wider determinants of health across the health and social care system in England. In July 2022, as part of 'net zero' plans for the NHS, the SDU was replaced with the Greener NHS National Programme.

== History ==
NHS SDU was set up in 2008 by the CEO of the NHS, Sir David Nicholson. It was formed by the NHS in England under the auspices of the Office of the Strategic Health Authorities (OSHA) and originally hosted by NHS East of England and its chief executive, Sir Neil McKay.

In 2013 the SDU dropped ‘NHS’ from its title when it took on responsibility for the whole health and care sector. It was at this point that it became co-funded by and accountable to both NHS England and Public Health England, and began reporting to a cross-system advisory board with representation from the Department of Health, DEFRA, DoH arm's length bodies (including NHS Improvement, NICE, Care Quality Commission, NHS Digital, Health Education England) and key national agencies such as NHS Property Services, King's Fund, the NHS Confederation and NHS Providers.

=== Replacement ===
The Health and Care Act 2022 amended the National Health Service Act 2006 to require NHS England to contribute towards compliance with the UK's net zero emissions target (the 2050 goal set by the Climate Change Act 2008) and other environmental targets. In response, a 'Greener NHS' national programme was developed, which was described in July 2022 as building on the work of the former Sustainable Development Unit.

== Structure and role ==
The SDU developed tools, policy and research to help people and organisations to promote sustainable development and adapt to climate change. The SDU was co-funded by NHS England and Public Health England, and hosted within NHS England. It had a cross-system advisory group that included the Department of Health, DEFRA and most of the major national health agencies. SDU staff were based in Cambridge.

The SDU calculated the first comprehensive carbon footprint for the NHS in 2008, and in 2012 for the whole health and social care system. In 2008, the NHS was the first major organisation to measure its Scope 3 supply chain carbon emissions, and recognise that it was impossible to achieve its carbon reduction targets without also working to achieve a significant reduction in supply chain emissions.
