= Hermesmann v. Seyer =

1993 American child support case in Kansas

- Court: Supreme Court of Kansas
- Full case name: State of Kansas, ex rel., Colleen Hermesmann v. Shane Seyer, a minor, and Dan and Mary Seyer, his parents
- Decided: 5 March 1993
- Citations: 252 Kan. 646, 847 P.2d 1273 (Kan. 1993)

Case history
- Prior action: State ex rel. Hermesmann v. Seyer (Kan. Dist. Ct. Shawnee County 1992)

Case opinions
- Decision by: Richard Winn Holmes

Hermesmann v. Seyer (State of Kansas ex rel. Hermesmann v. Seyer, 847 P.2d 1273 (Kan. 1993)) was a precedent-setting Kansas, United States, case in which Colleen Hermesmann successfully argued that a woman is entitled to sue the father of her child for child support even if conception occurred as a result of a criminal act committed by the woman. The case was brought in her name by the then Kansas Department of Social and Rehabilitation Services.

== Background ==
Colleen Hermesmann was a 16-year-old babysitter who in 1987 was hired to take care of 12-year-old Shane Seyer. The two began a sexual relationship, and when Hermesmann was 17 and Seyer was 13, the former became pregnant. The baby, a daughter, was born in 1989. Criminal charges were brought against Hermesmann by Shawnee County, Kansas, accusing her of "engaging in the act of sexual intercourse with a child under sixteen". Hermesmann ultimately took a plea bargain, pleading guilty to the lesser offense of "contributing to a child's misconduct".

In 1991, the Kansas Department of Social and Rehabilitation Services, in Hermesmann's name, took Seyer to court seeking child support. Hermesmann's criminal culpability was not addressed in this trial, as this was purely a civil court case. The department also sought and was awarded $7,000, equivalent to $16,500 in 2025, for its own costs. However, in the later Supreme Court hearing, the department stated it never had any intention of collecting its award.

== Kansas Supreme Court case ==
In 1993, the Kansas Supreme Court rejected an appeal by Seyer that he was not liable to pay for child support. The court held that the admitted facts established that, because being under 16 he had been legally unable to consent to sex, a crime against him had been committed under statutory rape law, but that Seyer had actually given consent to the acts under civil law. The court ruled that "at no time did Shane register any complaint to his parents about the sexual liaison with Colleen". The court also ruled that a mother's potential culpability under criminal statutes was of no relevance in determining the father's child support liability in a civil action. The court stated "The State's interest in requiring minor parents to support their children overrides the State's competing interest in protecting juveniles from improvident acts, even when such acts may include criminal activity on the part of the other parent".

== Precedents set ==
The case established a precedent which has subsequently been used in the Kansas courts. It is one of the earlier cases now cited in U.S. child-support guidelines which say that in every case that has addressed the issue the court has decided that an underage boy is liable for the support of his child even when the conception was the result of criminal conduct by the mother.

In a 1997 case before the Florida District Court of Appeal, the court's decision cited Hermesmann, saying that the Kansas decision was taken even though the Kansas statute states "a person under 15 years of age is incapable of consent as a matter of law". The court also remarked that "the Kansas court did not address the question of whether lack of actual consent (apart from the statutory definition) could form the basis of a defense to an action to establish paternity". In this case also the question of whether actual non-consent might be a defense was not before the court.

== See also ==
- Forced fatherhood
- Statutory rape
- Sex crime
