= Hague Convention on the International Recovery of Child Support and Other Forms of Family Maintenance =

Treaty regarding child support

Convention of 23 November 2007 on the International Recovery of Child Support and Other Forms of Family Maintenance
- Parties Signatories that did not ratify Party (treaty not entered into force)
- Signed: 23 November 2007
- Location: The Hague, The Netherlands
- Effective: 1 January 2013
- Condition: Ratification by 2 states
- Signatories: 21
- Parties: 30 covering 55 countries
- Depositary: Ministry of Foreign Affairs (Netherlands)
- Languages: English and French

The Hague Convention on the International Recovery of Child Support and Other Forms of Family Maintenance, also referred to as the Hague Maintenance Convention or the Hague Child Support Convention is a multilateral treaty governing the enforcement of judicial decisions regarding child support (and other forms of family support) extraterritorially. It is one of a number of conventions in the area of private international law of the Hague Conference on Private International Law in 2007. The convention is open to all states as well as to Regional Economic Integration Organizations as long as they are composed of sovereign states only and have sovereignty in (part of) the content of the convention. The convention entered into force on 1 January 2013 between Norway and Albania and applies now in 55 countries worldwide.

== Forms of maintenance ==
Three forms of maintenance form the core of the convention and are defined in article 2:

1. obligations towards children below the age of 21 (or 18, if a reservation is made)
2. spousal support in a case linked to child support
3. spousal support (with limited governmental assistance in obtaining results)

A country can further declare to apply the convention to other forms of family maintenance: "any maintenance obligation arising from a family relationship, parentage, marriage or affinity, including in particular obligations in respect of vulnerable persons". Such a wider scope is only valid between two member states if both have an increase to scope.

== Procedure ==
States Parties are to establish a Central Authority for the convention. The Authority in the country of residence of the requester is the authority through which requests for enforcement of judicial or administrative decisions can be made, while the authority in the country to which the request is lodged should provide further -free- help with the application. As the convention is based on enforcement of judicial decisions, the merit of the decision itself may not be taken into account. The request should include the decision as well as proof that the "respondent had proper notice of the proceedings and an opportunity to be heard, or that the respondent had proper notice of the decision and the opportunity to challenge or appeal it on fact and law". The receiving authority is required to actively enforce the decisions by means which are at least as effective as those used when enforcing decisions within that country. They may include withholding of wages or social security payments or garnishments from bank accounts. Also public bodies may request enforcement if they are eligible to receive payments because one of the parties has made a claim to public funds.

== States parties ==
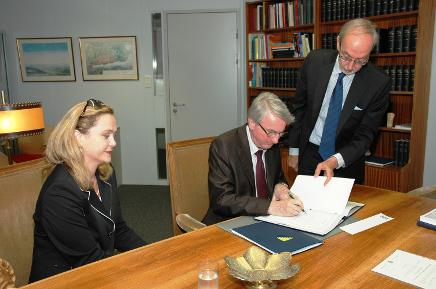
Signature of Bosnia-Herzegovina by Safet Halilović, Minister of human rights and refugees

The convention entered into force on 1 January 2013 following ratification by two states: Albania and Norway. For Bosnia-Herzegovina and Ukraine, the convention entered into force later in 2013. The European Union became a party in 2014 as a Regional Economic Integration Organization. Because the subject matter of the convention fully falls within EU competency, the EU rather than the individual member states became a party. The convention is applicable to all 27 member states and only applies to those territories that form part of the European Union. Also the UK was covered by the European Union territory with regards to this convention until 1 January 2021 (the end of the transition period, when it became a member itself. As the EU ratification did not cover Denmark, the convention appies there only after it ratified in 2025. In December 2015, and July 2016, Montenegro and Turkey respectively acceded to the convention, which entered into force for it on 1 January 2017 and February 2017 respectively, for those parties that have not objected to the accession. The convention entered into force for the US on 1 January 2017 following ratification in September 2016. The United States Senate approved the treaty in 2010, and implementation legislation has been passed on a federal level (Preventing Sex Trafficking and Strengthening Families Act, public law 113-183). Ratification could only take place after legislation at state level (UIFSA 2008) had been passed in 54 jurisdictions (the 50 states, DC, Virgin Islands, Puerto Rico, Guam), which was done in March 2016.

Signatories that did not ratify are Burkina Faso and North Macedonia.

Party	Entry into Force	Spousal Support	Support to adult children until	other recognized support
Albania	1 January 2013	check	21 (25, high school or university students)	
Azerbaijan	27 November 2024		18	
Belarus	1 June 2018	✗	18	
Botswana	16 November 2023			
Bosnia and Herzegovina	1 February 2013	✗	21	
Brazil	1 November 2017	check		collateral or direct kinship, or affinity, including vulnerable persons
Cabo Verde	12 January 2025	✗		
Canada (British Columbia, Manitoba, Nova Scotia, Ontario and Saskatchewan)	1 February 2024	check	21	vulnerable adult children; Entry into force for British Columbia: 1 March 2024, for Ontario and Saskatchewan: 1 December 2026
Colombia	1 July 2025			
Denmark	1 October 2025	✗		
Dominican Republic	23 March 2025	✗	18	vulnerable persons
Ecuador	2 July 2022			
El Salvador	7 February 2026			
European Union (Note: The convention applied to the UK as part of the European Union until Brexit on 1 February 2020, and until 1 January 2021, the European Union membership still encompassed the United Kingdom for this convention. The accession of the UK as a party in its own right, deposited on 2 January 2019, was first suspended and finally retracted on 30 January. The UK ratified the convention on 28 September 2020 with entry into force on 1 January 2021)	1 August 2014	check	21	
Georgia	1 September 2024	✗	18	
Guyana	7 March 2020			
Honduras	19 October 2018	✗		
Kazakhstan	14 June 2019	✗		
Kyrgyzstan	1 November 2024	✗		
Montenegro	1 January 2017	✗	✗ (reserves the right to limit to children under 18)	
New Zealand	1 November 2021	check		
Nicaragua	18 April 2020	✗		
Norway	1 January 2013	check	21 (25 may be recognized)	
Paraguay	1 February 2025	✗	18	family relationship, parentage, marriage or affinity, especially regarding vulnerable persons
Serbia	1 February 2021		21 (26 if education continues)	adult children incapable for work and lacking the funding to support themselves
Turkey	1 February 2017	check	21 (25 if education continues)	mentally and physically disabled children (irrespective of age); and parents in need of care
Ukraine	1 November 2013	✗	18 (23, students)	incapacitated adults (from adult children, parents, siblings) children raised by grand parents
United Kingdom (Note: Including Gibraltar)	1 January 2021	check		
United States	1 January 2017	✗		

The convention will not apply between Denmark and Azerbaijan, Botswana, Cabo Verde, Dominican Republic, El Salvador, Guyana, Honduras, Kazakhstan, Kyrgyzstan, Montenegro and Nicaragua. The convention also does not apply between the United States and 4 states: Azerbaijan, Botswana, Guyana and Kazakhstan following the objection of the US to the accession those countries. The US has indicated for some of those objections the lack of information about their child support legislation and procedures as a reason for the objection.

== Relationship to other Conventions ==
The convention revises two Hague Conventions as well a United Nations convention relating to family support. When the convention is in force on the territories of members which are also parties to one of those conventions, the 2007 convention is applicable.

Year	Title	States covered by 2007 convention	States not covered by 2007 convention
1973	Hague Convention on the Recognition and Enforcement of Decisions Relating to Maintenance Obligations	21	3
1958	Hague Convention concerning the recognition and enforcement of decisions relating to maintenance obligations towards children	16	4
1956	United Nations Convention on the Recovery Abroad of Maintenance	38	26

== Protocol ==
Hague Maintenance Protocol
Protocol on the Law Applicable to Maintenance Obligations
- Parties Signatory that did not ratify Party (treaty not entered into force)
- Signed: 23 November 2007
- Location: The Hague, The Netherlands
- Effective: 1 August 2013
- Condition: Ratification by 2 states
- Signatories: 9
- Parties: 8, covering 33 countries Albania; Brazil; Ecuador; European Union (all 27 Member States, except Denmark); Georgia; Kazakhstan; Paraguay; Serbia; Ukraine
- Depositary: Government of the Netherlands
- Languages: English and French

Which law is applicable on maintenance obligations is not governed by the conventions but by a protocol concluded on the same day. In 2010, it was ratified by the European Union, which declared it had competence over all matters concerning the protocol with regards to all its member states except for Denmark and the United Kingdom. It applied the Protocol since 2011 provisionally, also between its member states within the Maintenance regulation. Serbia has ratified the Protocol on 10 April 2013, leading to entry into force of the convention on 1 August 2013. Afterwards Kazakhstan (2016), Brazil (2017), Ecuador (2022), Ukraine (2022), Georgia (2024), Albania (2024) and Paraguay (2024) became parties. North Macedonia has signed the convention, but did not ratify it.

=== Applicable law ===
The applicable law that is determined by the convention is not restricted to the laws of the parties to the convention: it is therefore possible that a law of a non-state party is chosen. As a general rule, the law of the habitual residence of the creditor (the person obtaining maintenance) habitual residence applies. In cases of parents towards their children, children towards their parents, and persons regarding young persons (under 21, and if there is no spousal relationship) the following 3 laws are considered in a so-called cascade:

1. Law of the debtor (general rule under the convention), but if that leads to no maintenance
2. Law of the forum, and if that leads to no maintenance:
3. Law of the common nationality

If the court seized is the debtor's habitual residence, the first two applicable laws are reversed leading to the following cascade:

1. Law of the forum (the law of the debtor's habitual residence), but if that leads to no maintenance
2. Law of the creditor (general rule under the convention), and if that leads to no maintenance:
3. Law of the common nationality

In the cases of (former) spouses, either party may object to the use of the law of the creditor's habitual residence, instead using the law which as a closer connection with the marriage if "the law of another State, in particular the State of their last common habitual residence, has a closer connection with the marriage". In cases where both parties share a nationality and the law of that nationality as well as the law of the debtor's habitual residence would not lead to maintenance, a debtor may also contest to use of the law of the creditor's habitual residence, provided it is not a case relating to child support. In cases not concerning child support (for children below 18) or vulnerable adults, both parties may choose the law governing the maintenance, choosing from:

- law of nationality (of one of the parties)
- law of the habitual residence (of one of the parties)
- law applied to their property regime
- law applied to their divorce or legal separation

== See also ==
- International matrimonial law
