= Convention on the Recovery Abroad of Maintenance =

1956 United Nations treaty

- Signatories Parties
- Signed: 20 June 1956
- Location: New York, US
- Effective: 25 May 1957
- Condition: 3 ratifications
- Signatories: 24
- Parties: 64
- Depositary: Secretary-General of the United Nations
- Languages: Chinese, English, French, Russian and Spanish

The Convention on the Recovery Abroad of Maintenance is a 1956 United Nations treaty which allows individuals to enforce judicial decisions regarding child support and alimony extraterritorially. It can be used only if the person seeking maintenance and the person paying maintenance are both resident in states that have ratified the Convention.

The Convention was concluded on 20 June 1956 at the United Nations Conference on Maintenance Obligations, held at UN headquarters in New York from 29 May to 20 June. It was signed by 24 and entered into force on 25 May 1957. As of 2015, there are 64 states that have ratified the Convention, which includes 63 United Nations member states plus the Holy See.

The principles contained in the Convention were updated in 2007 with the conclusion of the Hague Convention on the International Recovery of Child Support and Other Forms of Family Maintenance.
