= Childwite =

Fine paid to the lord in medieval England

In medieval England, childwite (also childwit, childwyte; lit. 'child-punishment') was a fine levied by the feudal lord on the reputed father when an unmarried unfree woman gave birth to a child. The Oxford English Dictionary cites the following use of the term from 1672: "Within the Mannor of Writtle in Com. Essex, every reputed Father of a Bastard gotten there, pays to the Lord for a Fine three shillings four pence [one-sixth of a pound], and the custome is there also called Childwit."

== See also ==
- Manorialism
