= Robert J. Franco =

American set decorator

- Occupation: Set decorator
- Years active: 1980-1996

Robert J. Franco is an American set decorator. He was nominated for an Academy Award in the category Best Art Direction for the film The Age of Innocence. He also won a Primetime Emmy Award in the category Outstanding Art Direction for a Miniseries or a Special for his work on the television film Death of a Salesman.

== Selected filmography ==
- The Age of Innocence (1993; co-nominated with Dante Ferretti)
