= California Child Support Guideline Review =

Each U.S. state is responsible for developing a child support enforcement program that complies with federal requirements, including a guidelines method of calculating child support. At minimum, 45 C.F.R. 302.56 requires each state to establish and publish a guideline that is presumptively (but rebuttably) correct, and review the guideline, at a minimum, every four years.

== Background ==
California has codified its guideline in its Family Code sections 4050–4076.

The California child support guideline is "presumptively" (but rebuttably) correct and directed toward the following principles or goals:

- (a) A parent's first and principal obligation is to support his or her minor children according to the parent's circumstances and station in life.
- (b) Both parents are mutually responsible for the support of their children.
- (c) The Guideline takes into account each parent's actual income and level of responsibility for the children.
- (d) Each parent should pay for the support of the children according to his or her ability.
- (e) The guideline seeks to place the interests of children as the state's top priority.
- (f) Children should share in the standard of living of both parents. Child support may therefore appropriately improve the standard of living of the custodial household to improve the lives of the children.
- (g) Child support orders in cases in which both parents have high levels of responsibility for the children should reflect the increased costs of raising the children in two homes and should minimize significant disparities in the children's living standards in the two homes.
- (h) The financial needs of the children should be met through private financial resources as much as possible.
- (i) It is presumed that a parent having primary physical responsibility for the children contributes a significant portion of available resources for the support of the children.
- (j) The Guideline seeks to encourage fair and efficient settlements of conflicts between parents and seeks to minimize the need for litigation.
- (k) The Guideline is intended to be presumptively correct in all cases, and only under special circumstances should child support orders fall below the child support mandated by the guideline formula.
- (l) Child support orders must ensure that children actually receive fair, timely, and sufficient support reflecting the California's high standard of living and high costs of raising children compared to other states.

The Judicial Council of California is required by law to review its guideline every four years at a minimum. In conducting the review the following broad cross-section of groups must be consulted:

- Custodial parents and non-custodial parents.
- Representatives of established women's rights and fathers' rights groups.
- Representatives of established organizations that advocate for the economic well-being of children.
- Members of the judiciary, district attorney's offices, the Attorney General's office, and the Department of Child Support Services.
- Certified family law specialists.
- Academicians specializing in family law.
- Persons representing low-income parents.
- Persons representing recipients of assistance under the CalWORKs program seeking child support services.

== Guideline reviews ==
=== 1993 ===
In 1993, the first California Child Support Guideline Review was prepared under the guidance of the Judicial Council Family and Juvenile Law Standing Advisory Committee. In the 1993 Review, focus groups including stakeholders identified in the statute were not consulted with. In the 1993 Review, the Judicial Council recommended that:

- No major changes be made to the Guideline for several years.
- California have a single Guideline, with no alternates.
- Research be done on the operation of the Guideline.
- Require courts to report the basis (findings) of the support awards.
- Make a clear rule on how to apply hardship deductions.
- Conduct a detailed study on how low income cases are handled.
- Set an annual high income limit of $204,000 (combined), where the Guideline would be replaced by judicial discretion.
- Provide a "simplified" income and expense declaration.
- Set a presumption of 20% timeshare unless the actual timeshare is below 15% or above 25%.
- Specify factors for imputing income.
- After three children, the Guideline would be replaced by judicial discretion.

=== 1998 ===
In 1998, the second California Child Support Guideline Review was prepared under the guidance of the Judicial Council Family and Juvenile Law Standing Advisory Committee. In the 1998 Review, focus groups including stakeholders identified in the statute were not consulted with. In the 1998 Review, the Judicial Council recommended that:

- No change be made to the Guideline.
- Studies be conducted regarding: Lack of documentation in court files; Low income adjustments; Lack of orders for mandatory additional support; Consideration of prior or subsequent families; Pro se litigants; Funding for further research.

=== 2001 ===
In 2001, the third California Child Support Guideline Review was outsourced to Policy Studies Inc. (PSI) of Denver, CO. Since 1991 PSI has been providing "full service" private child support services, and is currently the leading provider of child support services, operating 13 full-service offices throughout the nation (locating non-custodial parents, establishing paternity and child support orders, securing health coverage for children, and enforcing child support payments). In the 2001 Review, the Judicial Council directed PSI to investigate predefined questions. In the 2001 Review, PSI did consult with focus groups including stakeholders identified in the statute. In the 2001 Review, the Judicial Council recommended that:

- No change be made to the Guideline (i.e., continue to use disposable net income instead of gross income, and no change regarding treatment of additional dependents).
- If California decides to introduce a low income adjustment, then the current low income threshold of $1000 should be reconsidered, especially in light of the findings of the Urban Institute's study on child support debt, as it may provide insight on why low income obligors are unable to pay.

=== 2005 ===
In 2005, the fourth California Child Support Guideline Review was again outsourced to Policy Studies Inc. (PSI) of Denver, CO. In the 2005 Review, PSI only consulted with a focus group of family court commissioners, instead of all stakeholders identified in the statute. In the 2005 Review, the Judicial Council recommended that:

- No change be made to the Guideline.
- Research the impact of support orders on low income families.
- Increase the low income threshold for low income adjustments.
- Treat child's health insurance as additional support (similar to child care).
- Make a clear rule on how to apply hardship deductions.
- Encourage better and more detailed documentation in court files.

=== 2009–2011 ===
November 10, 2009, the Judicial Council issued a "Notice of Intent to Award", outsourcing the fifth California Child Support Guideline Review directly to Center for Policy Research of Denver, CO.

November 30, 2010, the Judicial Council released its Draft Report recommendations for public comment.

June 2011, the Judicial Council published its Final Report. The study arrived at five recommendations as follows:

- No change be made to the Guideline
- Update and/or modify the low-income adjustment in the Guideline.
- Evaluate the current income attribution policies as it applies to both parents. This includes codifying case law on income imputation and reviewing the existing income presumption provision to determine if it continues to be consistent with the legislative principles regarding child support.
- Educate stakeholders and equip them with information so that they can make the current system work better. In addition, develop strategies to engage stakeholders and encourage their active participation in the child support process.
- Adopt any necessary conforming changes so that California can meet the 2008 federal medical support rules, but also recognize that the 2010 national health reform may produce future changes to the federal rules as well as changes in how states approach medical support.
- Encourage better and more detailed information in the case file.

=== 2016 ===
As of now the Judicial Council is out of compliance with state law in reviewing its Child Support Guidelines. The Judicial Council has announced an intent to begin its review process. Final product is not expected until 2017. Child Support Review began (In Secret) in January 2017 by a group that calls itself "Center for Support of Families". They gave private notice to certain groups to provide feedback 10 days prior to closing review in March 2017.

On August 18, 2017, the California Judicial Council released the document SP17-05 that is an invitation for public comment on its review of California's Child Support Guidelines that is a report from the Center for the Support of Families that won the contract from the Judicial Council in January 2016. The public comment period ended on September 22, 2017.

== Background ==
California has codified its Guideline in its Family Code sections 4050–4076.

== See also ==
- Child custody
- Child support
- Child support in the United States
