= Bradley Amendment =

United States legal amendment concerning child support

In United States law, the Bradley Amendment (42 U.S.C. § 666(a)(9)(c)) is an amendment intended to improve the effectiveness of child support enforcement. It is named after Senator Bill Bradley, who introduced it.

The Bradley Amendment requires state courts to prohibit retroactive reduction of child support obligations. Specifically, it automatically triggers a non-expiring lien whenever child support becomes past-due; overrides any state's statute of limitations; and disallows any judicial discretion, even from bankruptcy judges.

== History ==
Authors Kathryn Edin and Timothy J. Nelson attribute the Bradley Amendment's origin to a January 1986 CBS News special report, The Vanishing Family: Crisis in Black America, hosted by Bill Moyers. Edin and Nelson noted that The Vanishing Family "went on to win every major award in journalism" and inspired overwhelmingly sympathetic reactions from influential commentators, leading to the amendment's proposal in May 1986.

The amendment text was included in the Sixth Omnibus Budget Reconciliation Act, 1986, bill S.2706.

Subtitle C: Miscellaneous Provisions - Amends part D Child Support of title IV of the Act to prohibit the retroactive modification of child support arrearages except with respect to such arrearages which accumulate after the obligee and entity which is issued the child support order receive notice that the obligor has pending an active application for modification of such order.

Senator Bill Bradley, Democrat of New Jersey, introduced the amendment in an earlier bill on May 5, 1986. It passed in the Senate with amendments with an 88–7 vote on September 20, 1986. The related House resolution H.R. 5300 was signed into law on October 21, 1986.

== Criticism ==
Legislators and scholars have called for reform of the Bradley Amendment.

From 2004, the Bradley Amendment was challenged as unconstitutional and was the subject of a repeal effort; in February 2006, the court case was dismissed.

In 2011, William S. Boyd School of Law professor Ann Cammett published a scholarly article which criticized the Bradley Amendment for compounding prisoners' debts and for preempting other approaches to child support.

Columnist Diane Dimond cited the Bradley Amendment as "working against the wronged man," criticizing the amendment for prohibiting state judges from retroactively modifying orders for persons to pay child support even when a purported father later proves that he is not the parent.

In 2018, Lynne Haney, a sociology professor at New York University, wrote an opinion article in the Los Angeles Times calling for reform of the Bradley Amendment. Haney noted the significant number of child support debtors, particularly African American fathers, who have been imprisoned for failing to pay their child support obligations.
