= Child support =

Ongoing, periodic payment made by a parent for the financial benefit of a child

Child support (or child maintenance) is an ongoing, periodic payment made by a parent for the financial benefit of a child (state or parent, caregiver, guardian) following the end of a marriage or other similar relationship. Court-ordered child maintenance is paid directly or indirectly by an obligor to an obligee for the care and support of children of a relationship or marriage that has been terminated, or in some cases never existed. Often the obligor is a non-custodial parent. The obligee is typically a custodial parent, a caregiver, or a guardian.

Depending on the jurisdiction, a custodial parent may pay child support to a non-custodial parent. Typically one has the same duty to pay child support irrespective of sex, so a mother is required to pay support to a father just as a father must pay a mother. In some jurisdictions where there is joint custody, the child is considered to have two custodial parents and no non-custodial parents, and a custodial parent with a higher income (obligor) may be required to pay the other custodial parent (obligee). In other jurisdictions, and even with legally shared residence, unless they can prove exactly equal contributions, one parent will be deemed the non-resident parent for child support and will have to pay the other parent a proportion of their income; the "resident" parent's income or needs are not assessed.

Child support is often arranged as part of a single parent, divorce, marital separation, annulment, determination of parentage or dissolution of a civil union and may supplement alimony (spousal support) arrangements.

The right to child support and the responsibilities of parents to provide such support have been internationally recognized. The 1992 United Nations Convention on the Rights of the Child is a binding convention signed by every member nation of the United Nations and formally ratified by all but the United States. It declares that the upbringing and development of children and a standard of living adequate for the children's development is a common responsibility of both parents and a fundamental human right for children, and asserts that the primary responsibility to provide such for the children rests with their parents. Other United Nations documents and decisions related to child-support enforcement include the 1956 New York Convention on the Recovery Abroad of Maintenance created under the auspices of the United Nations, which has been ratified by the 64 of the UN member states.

In addition, the right to child support, as well as specific implementation and enforcement measures, has been recognized by various other international entities, including the Council of Europe, the European Union and the Hague Conference.

Within individual countries, examples of legislation pertaining to, and establishing guidelines for, the implementation and collection of child maintenance include the 1975 Family Law Act (Australia), the Child Support Act (United Kingdom) and the Maintenance and Affiliation Act (Fiji). Child support in the United States, 45 C.F.R. 302.56 requires each state to establish and publish a Guideline that is presumed correct (but rebuttable), and Review the Guideline, at a minimum, every four years. Child-support laws and obligations are known to be recognized in a vast majority of world nations, including the majority of countries in Europe, North America and Australia, as well as many in Africa, Asia and South America.

== Legal theory ==
Child support is based on the policy that both parents are obliged to financially support their children, even when the children are not living with both parents. Child support includes the financial support of children and not other forms of support, such as emotional support, intellectual support, physical care, or spiritual support.

When children live with both parents, courts rarely, if ever, direct the parents on how to provide financial support for their children. However, when the parents are not together, courts often order one parent to pay the other an amount set as financial support for the child. In such situations, one parent (the obligee) receives child support, and the other parent (the obligor) is ordered to pay child support. The amount of child support may be set on a case-by-case basis or by a formula estimating the amount thought that parents should pay to financially support their children.

Child support may be ordered to be paid by one parent to another when one is a non-custodial parent and the other is a custodial parent. Similarly, child support may also be ordered to be paid by one parent to another when both parents are custodial parents (joint or shared custody) and they share the child-raising responsibilities. In some cases, a parent with sole custody of their children may even be ordered to pay child support to the non-custodial parent to support the children while they are in the care of that parent.

Child support paid by a non-custodial parent or obligor does not absolve the obligor of the responsibility for costs associated with their child staying with the obligor in their home during visitation. For example, if an obligor pays child support to an obligee, this does not mean that the obligee is responsible for food, shelter, furniture, toiletries, clothes, toys or games, or any of the other child expenses directly associated with the child staying with the non-custodial parent or obligor.

In most jurisdictions, there is no need for the parents to be married, and only paternity and/or maternity (filiation) need to be demonstrated for a child-support obligation to be found by a competent court. Child support may also operate through the principle of estoppel where a de facto parent that is in loco parentis for sufficient time to establish a permanent parental relationship with the child or children.

Canadian courts differ in that the "Divorce Act" sets out in detail, the financial responsibilities of the "Non-Custodial" parent whilst the "Custodial" parent's responsibilities are not mentioned. Consequently, Canadian courts limit themselves to dividing the "Non-Custodial" parents income and providing it to the "Custodial" parent. While the courts recognize that the child has an "expectation of support from both parents", there is no legal precedent under the "Divorce Act" indicating that the "Custodial" parent has any obligation to support the child. In addition, courts have vehemently opposed any attempt by "Non-Custodial" parents to ensure "Child Support" is actually used for the child.

== Child support vs. contact ==
While the issues of child support and visitation or contact may be decided in the same divorce or paternity settlement, in most jurisdictions the two rights and obligations are completely separate and individually enforceable. Custodial parents may not withhold contact to "punish" a noncustodial parent for failing to pay some or all child support required. Conversely, a noncustodial parent is required to pay child support even if they are partially or fully denied contact with the child. Furthermore, child support is established between parents also if joint custody is awarded, but the child spends most of the time with one of the parents.

Additionally, a non-custodial parent is responsible for child-support payments even if they do not wish to have a relationship with the child. Courts have maintained that a child's right to financial support from parents supersedes an adult's wish not to assume a parenting role.

While child support and contact are separate issues, in some jurisdictions, the latter may influence the former. In the United Kingdom, for example, the amount of support ordered may be reduced based on the number of nights per week the child regularly spends at the support-giving parent's home.

== Use of child support payments ==
Most international and national child-support regulations recognize that every parent has an obligation to support their child. Under this obligation, both parents are expected to share the responsibility for their child(ren)'s expenses. What differs between jurisdictions is which "expenses" are covered by "Child Support" and which are "Extraordinary" and fall outside the definition of "Child Support".

Support moneys collected are often assumed to be used for the child's expenses, such as food, clothing, and ordinary educational needs, but that is not required. Under California law, for example, child-support money may be used to "improve the standard of living of the custodial household" and the recipient does not have to account for how the money is spent.

Child support orders may earmark funds for specific items for the child, such as school fees, day care, and medical expenses. In some cases, obligors parents may pay for these items directly. For example, they may pay tuition fees directly to their child's school, rather than remitting money for the tuition to the obligee. Orders may also require each parent to assume a percentage of expenses for various needs. For instance, in the U.S. state of Massachusetts, custodial parents are required to pay for the first $100 of annual uninsured medical costs incurred by each child. Only then will the courts consider authorizing child-support money from a non-custodial parent to be used for said costs. Canadian courts provide child support through the "Federal Child Support Guidelines" based on income; however, "Extraordinary Expenses" can be ordered.

Many American universities also consider non-custodial parents partially responsible for paying college costs, and will consider parents' income in their financial aid determinations. In certain states, non-custodial parents may be ordered by the court to assist with these expenses. Canadian Universities all have different standards but essentially mimic the provincial standards required for student loan eligibility. While both parents are expected to provide support, "Custodial Parents" are rarely ordered to provide it whilst "Non-Custodial" parents are required to provide it under the law.

In the United States, obligors may receive a medical order that requires them to add their children to their health insurance plans. In some states both parents are responsible for providing medical insurance for the child/children. If both parents possess health coverage, the child may be added to the more beneficial plan, or use one to supplement the other. Children of active or retired members of the U.S. armed forces are also eligible for health coverage as military dependents, and may be enrolled in the DEERS program at no cost to the obligor.

Accountability regulations for child support money vary by country and state. In some jurisdictions, such as Australia, child support recipients are trusted to use support payments in the best interest of the child, and thus are not required to provide details on specific purchases. In California, there is no limitations, accountability, or other restriction on how the obligee spends the child support received, it is merely presumed that the money is spent on the child. However, in other jurisdictions, a child support recipient might legally be required to give specific details on how child support money is spent at the request of the court or the non-custodial parent. In the United States, 10 states (Colorado, Delaware, Florida, Indiana, Louisiana, Missouri, Nebraska, Oklahoma, Oregon, and Washington) allow courts to demand an accounting on expenses and spending from custodial parents. Additionally, Alabama courts have authorized such accounting under certain specific circumstances.

== Obtaining child support ==
Child-support laws and regulations vary around the world. Legal intervention is not mandatory: some parents have informal or voluntary agreements or arrangements that do not involve the courts, where financial child support and/or other expenses are provided to the other parent to assist in supporting their child(ren). A voluntary maintenance arrangement can in certain jurisdictions be approved by judicial authorities.

A major impetus to collection of child support in many places is recovery of welfare expenditure. A resident or custodial parent receiving public assistance, as in the United States, is required to assign their right to child support to the Department of Welfare before cash assistance is received. Another common requirement of welfare benefits in some jurisdictions is that a custodial parent must pursue child support from the non-custodial parent.

=== Court procedures ===
In divorce cases, child-support payments may be determined as part of the divorce settlement, along with other issues, such as alimony, custody and visitation. In other cases, there are several steps that must be undertaken to receive court-ordered child support. Some parents anticipating that they will receive child support may hire lawyers to oversee their child support cases for them; others may file their own applications in their local courthouses.

While procedures vary by jurisdiction, the process of filing a motion for court ordered child support typically has several basic steps.

1. One parent, or their attorney, must file an application or complaint with the local court for the establishment of child support. The information required varies by jurisdiction, but generally collects identifying data about both parents and the child(ren) involved in the case, including their names, social security or tax identification numbers and dates of birth. Parents may also be required to furnish details relating to their marriage and divorce, if applicable, as well as documents certifying the identity and parentage of the child(ren). Local jurisdictions may charge fees for filing such applications, however, if the filing parent is receiving any sort of public assistance, these fees may be waived.
2. The other parent is located, and served a court summons by a local sheriff, police officer, bailiff or process server. The summons informs the other parent that they are being sued for child support. Once served, the other parent must attend a mandatory court hearing to determine if they are responsible for child-support payments.
3. In cases where parentage of a child is denied, has not been established by marriage or is not listed on the birth certificate, or where paternity fraud is suspected, courts may order or require establishment of paternity. Paternity may be established voluntarily if the father signs an affidavit or may be proven through DNA testing in contested cases. Once the identity of the father is confirmed through DNA testing, the child's birth certificate may be amended to include the father's name.
4. After the responsibility for child support is established and questions of paternity have been answered to the court's satisfaction, the court will notify the obligor and order that parent to make timely child support payments, fees (which may be 0, $60, or more) and establish any other provisions, such as medical orders. Generally the father will be required to pay for genetic testing.

=== Calculating the amount ===
Various approaches to calculating the amount of child-support award payments exist. Many jurisdictions consider multiple sources of information when determining support, taking into account the income of the parents, child custody shares, the number and ages of children living in the home, basic living expenses and school fees. If the child has special needs, such as treatment for a serious illness or disability, these costs may also be taken into consideration.

Guidelines for support orders may be based on rules that require obligors to pay a percentage of their annual income or a flat amount toward their children's expenses. In the United Kingdom, for instance, there are four basic rates of child support based on the obligors' income, which are then modified and adjusted based on several factors. In the United States, the federal government requires all states to have guideline calculations. Guidelines are either a percentage of income or more usually in the form of tables listing incomes and the amount needed to support one to six children. These computations are often performed by computer programs upon input of certain financial information including, earnings, visitation (overnights with the non-custodial parent (NCP)), health insurance costs, and several other factors. If tables are used in the guidelines those tables are computed by economists such as Policy Studies, Inc. They examine spending patterns of couples without children and couples with children in the consumer expenditure survey. The amount of additional money spent on the children (for expenses such as automobile insurance; AP exams; cell phones and plans; Christmas presents; educational expenses (trips, pictures, study guides, tutoring, AP and SAT exams, books, supplies, and uniforms); laptops; music lessons; parking fees; private school tuition; sports activities; and summer camps is computed and reduced to a table. Separating parents then find their incomes in the table and how much average intact families pay on children. In the widely used income shares model that amount is divided in proportion to the parents income. The child support amounts can be compared with child benefit amounts.

=== Change of circumstances ===
Once established, child-support orders typically remain static unless otherwise reviewed. Obligors and obligees reserve the right to request a court review for modification (typically six months to one year or more after the issuance of the order or if the circumstances have changed such that the child support would change significantly). For instance, if the obligor has a change in income or faces financial hardship, they may petition the court for a reduction in support payments. Examples of financial hardship include supporting other children, unemployment, extraordinary healthcare expenses, etc. Likewise, if the obligor is spending more time with the child, they may petition the court for a reduction or even a reversal in support payments. Conversely, if the child's expenses increase, the obligee may ask the court to increase payments to cover the new costs

Although both parents have the right to petition the court for a support order adjustment, modifications are not automatic, and a judge may decide not to alter the amount of support after hearing the facts of the case. That is to say, simply because an obligors's income has decreased, a court may find that the decrease in income is of no fault of the child, and will not decrease the child's expenses, and therefore should not affect him or her financially. Likewise, a court may find that an increase in the child's expenses may have been calculated by the receiving parent and is not necessary, and therefore the support obligation of the paying parent should not increase.

In United States law, the Bradley Amendment (1986, 42 U.S.C. § 666(a)(9)(c)) requires state courts to prohibit retroactive reduction of child-support obligations. Specifically, it:

- automatically triggers a non-expiring lien whenever child support becomes past-due.
- overrides any state's statute of limitations.
- disallows any judicial discretion, even from bankruptcy judges.
- requires that the payment amounts be maintained without regard for the physical capability of the person owing child support (the obligor) to promptly document changed circumstances or regard for his awareness of the need to make the notification.

=== Distribution and payment ===
Child-support payments are distributed in a variety of ways. In cases where an obligor is liable for specific expenses such as school tuition, they may pay them directly instead of through the obligee.

In some jurisdictions, obligors (paying parents) are required to remit their payments to the governing federal or state child-support enforcement agency (State Disbursement Unit). The payments are recorded, any portion required to reimburse the government is subtracted, and then the remainder is passed on to the obligee (receiving parent), either through direct deposit or checks.

The first payee for child support depends on the current welfare status of the payee. For example, if the obligee is currently receiving a monthly check from the government, all current support collected during said month is paid to the government to reimburse the monies paid to the obligee. Regarding families formerly on assistance, current support is paid to the family first, and only after said support is received, the government may then collect additional payments to reimburse itself for previously paid assistance to the obligee (receiving parent). See 42 USC 657: "(A) Current Support Payments: To the extent that the amount so collected does not exceed the amount required to be paid to the family for the month in which collected, the State shall distribute the amount so collected to the family.".

Within the United States, a 2007 study conducted through the University of Baltimore estimates that 50% of all child-support arrears are owed to the government to reimburse welfare expenses. Half of U.S. states pass along none of the child support they collect to low-income families receiving welfare and other assistance, instead reimbursing themselves and the federal government. Most of the rest only pass along $50.00 per month. The bipartisan 2006 Deficit Reduction Act and other measures have sought to reduce the amount of money claimed by the government and to ensure that more funds are accessible by children and families, noting that more obligors (paying parents) are willing to pay child support when their children directly benefit from payments.

Most U.S. states deliver child-support benefits through direct deposit, but many states make payments to recipients who do not have a bank account through a prepaid debit card. State use of prepaid cards has helped increase the popularity of federal benefit debit cards, such as the Direct Express Debit MasterCard prepaid debit card offered by MasterCard, Visa, Chase, and Comerica Bank.

=== Duration of support orders ===
The duration of support orders varies both by jurisdiction and by case. Requirements for support typically end when the child reaches the age of majority, which may range in age from 16 to 23 (Massachusetts and Hawaii) or graduates from high school. Some countries and states have provisions that allow support to continue past the age of majority if the child is enrolled as a full-time, degree-seeking post-secondary student. If the obligor owes back child support, they must continue to make payments until the debt is satisfied, regardless of the age of the child.

Several circumstances allow for the termination of a support order for a child under the age of majority. These include the child's marriage, legal emancipation or death.

== Compliance and enforcement issues ==
=== "Deadbeat" parents ===
With respect to child support obligations, a deadbeat parent is one who has refused to provide child support payments or expenses.

US Governmental child support agencies typically refer to clients as being in compliance, not in compliance or criminally non-compliant. Compliance is judged by the paying party's performance in meeting the financial terms of the legal child support court order. In some circumstances, obligors found "not in compliance" or "criminally non-compliant" have even had their professional (e.g. doctors, lawyers, dentists, etc.) and other (e.g. driver's) licenses suspended or revoked in an effort to collect monies for support and shared expenses.

While the US has an extremely negotiable system, Canadian laws are fairly automatic and "No-Fault". Child support is determined by the number of children and the obligor's income.

=== Enforcement ===
Regulations and laws on the enforcement of child-support orders vary by country and state. In some jurisdictions, such as Australia, enforcement is overseen by a national office. In others, such as Canada, the responsibility to enforce child-support orders rests with individual provinces, with financial and logistical assistance from the federal government. In the United States, child-support enforcement is also handled largely at the state level, but non-compliant parents who meet certain criteria, such as traveling across state lines to circumvent orders or owing more than two years of support payments, may be subjected to federal prosecution under the Federal Deadbeat Punishment Act.

One focus of Article 27 of the Declaration of the Rights of the Child is the establishment and strengthening of international treaties to further aid in child-support order enforcement across national and international boundaries. Under these agreements, orders established in one country are considered valid and enforceable in another country, and may be pursued through local court processes. The goal of such conventions is to ensure that noncompliant parents will not be able to evade support payments by crossing an international border.

To this end, various international conventions regarding interjurisdictional enforcement of maintenance orders have been created, including the 1956 United Nations Convention on the Recovery Abroad of Maintenance, the Hague Conference's 1973 Convention on the Recognition and Enforcement of Decisions relating to Maintenance Obligations and the 1956 United Nations Convention on the Recovery Abroad of Maintenance and the 2007 Hague Maintenance Convention.

More than 100 nations currently have reciprocal arrangements for child support orders. Examples of reciprocal agreements include the UK Reciprocal Enforcement of Maintenance Orders (REMO) and those of Canada, Australia and New Zealand, the United States and the European Union.

Consequences of non-payment vary by jurisdiction, the length of time the parent has been noncompliant, and the amount owed. Typical penalties include wage garnishment and denial or suspension of drivers, hunting and professional licenses. In the United States, noncompliant parents who are more than $2500 in arrears may be denied passports under the Passport Denial Program. Australia, Austria, and Finland do not imprison persons for failure to pay child-support arrears. In the U.S., in contrast, non-payment of child support may be treated as a criminal offense or a civil offense, and it can result in a prison or jail term. In New York, continuous failure to provide child support is an E felony punishable by up to 4 years in prison. In addition, child-support debtors are subject to fines and property seizure.

Since the duty to provide child support is separate from the civil requirement to obey a court order regarding visitation, it is exceptionally rare for a parent to be jailed for violating that part of the court order.

== Criticism ==
=== Implementation flaws and side effects ===
In jurisdictions where child support is reduced or partially reduced when care is provided by both parents, there may be a financial incentive for the resident parent to restrict the amount of time the other parent can see the children. If a parent seeks a custody order with the goal of maximizing child support, the effect could be to reduce the amount of contact that the children have with the other parent without regard to their needs or wishes.

Payment is not made to children but between parents, and the payee is not required to account for how child-support money is spent. Critics of child support argue that, as a result, the support payments do not need to be used to support the child and can be regarded as a punishment to the parent who is paying child support. A response to that criticism is that if a parent is caring for the children, that parent will incur costs in providing that support, even if they have no duty to account for their expenditures in support of the child.

Critics of child support, such as fathers' rights groups, complain that the law does not necessarily require that the child support money be used for the child. Barring unusual circumstances, most jurisdictions do not require accountings on the request of a child support payor. The custodial parent also has a duty to support the children, yet in countries like Canada, it has been shown that "over a wide range of reasonable assumptions, the [custodial parent] does not financially contribute to the support of the children but in fact receives a net wealth transfer from the system." Child-support amounts are considerably higher than the costs of raising children.

Critics of child support suggest that support orders carry the threat of state violence to give the resident parent a degree of financial control over the non-resident parent, and even that the enforcement of child support can be considered domestic violence or abuse. No jurisdiction has accepted that argument, and a parent ordered to pay child support will not face any legal consequence if payments are made as ordered by the court.

Some parents argue that they should be permitted to directly provide for their children, with those provisions being credited against child support or taking the place of any payment to the other parent. Some argue that being ordered to pay child support reduces their ability to directly provide for their children. However, courts uniformly recognize that the custodial parent will incur expenses for the care of children that a non-custodial parent might prefer not to pay, and that giving the non-custodial parent direct control over how child support is used would in many cases result in abusive or controlling behavior by the child support payor.

Some child-support laws and formulas do not adequately reflect the extent to which the child-support payor supports the children, and the expenses the payor incurs in caring for the children. Many jurisdictions have tried to develop child-support formulas and models that take into account the extent to which parents share custody, and adjust child-support amounts in shared parenting arrangements in relation to the division of parenting time. In the UK a "non-resident" parent caring for the children 174 nights a year would have to pay the other parent (4/7) 57% of the maintenance they would have paid if they had provided no care. Thus, a "non-resident" parent may be obligated to pay up to 17% (31%*4/7) of their income as child support.

In the United States, each state receives money from the federal government to offset some of the expenses it incurs in processing paternity, spousal support and child-support cases. It has been argued that this creates an incentive for each state to enforce larger than necessary support orders, since doing so creates a larger financial incentive for each state. However, as a matter of law, when the federal government mandates state action it is broadly required to reimburse the state for the cost of the required action. It has also been argued that a Defendant in a child-support matter cannot get a fair trial due to the fact that the Courts have a financial interest in keeping child-support orders higher than necessary. However, there has never been a showing that states have created or modified their child-support formulas in such a manner, nor would doing so actually increase federal reimbursements.

Another criticism of child support is that it can be difficult for a man who has been mistakenly identified as a child's father, or who later discovers that he is not a child's biological parent, to be excused from an order to pay child support, and recover the money already taken from him.

=== A man's right to choose ===
Child-support policies have been criticized by fathers' rights advocacy groups, as well as by some feminists, who state that child-support policy violates gender equality and denies reproductive choice to men. Child support is based principally upon income and custody arrangements and not on gender, and male and female parents report similar levels of satisfaction with support awards. As child support is payable for the benefit of the children, not the parent, courts are not sympathetic to the idea that a parent should be able to refuse to support a child by claiming that he would have preferred that the child not be born.

Child-support guidelines and policies have also been criticized for requiring boys and men that are victims of sexual assault to pay child support to the women who sexually assaulted them; a precedent-setting case in US law is Hermesmann v. Seyer, whereby a male victim of statutory rape was required to pay child support to the mother. In the case of S.F. vs T.M. (1996), a man who produced evidence that the mother of the child raped him while he was unconscious was nevertheless ordered to pay child support. Men who assert that a child was conceived as a result of deception, birth-control fraud or sperm theft have also challenged their obligation to pay child support.

Melanie McCulley, a South Carolina attorney, coined the term male abortion in 1998, suggesting that a father should be allowed to disclaim his obligations to an unborn child early in the pregnancy. Proponents hold that concept begins with the premise that when an unmarried woman becomes pregnant, she has the option of abortion, adoption, or sole parenthood; and argues, in the context of legally recognized gender equality, that in the earliest stages of pregnancy, the putative (alleged) father should have the same human rights to relinquish all future parental rights and financial responsibility—leaving the informed mother with the same three options. McCulley's male-abortion concept aims to equalize the legal status of unwed men and unwed women by giving the unwed man by law the ability to 'abort' his rights and obligations to the child. If a woman decides to keep the child, the father may choose not to by severing all ties legally (in the same way a sperm donor usually rescinds all parental rights).

This same concept has been supported by a former president of the feminist organization National Organization for Women, attorney Karen DeCrow, who wrote that "if a woman makes a unilateral decision to bring pregnancy to term, and the biological father does not, and cannot, share in this decision, he should not be liable for 21 years of support...autonomous women making independent decisions about their lives should not expect men to finance their choice."

The legal concept was tried in the case of Dubay v. Wells and was rejected by the court, since legislation in the various jurisdictions currently sets forth guidelines for when child support is owed as well as its amount. Accordingly, legislation would be required to change the law to implement McCulley's concept.

== See also ==
- Aliment
- Child custody
- Costs of raising a child
- Debtor's prison
- Filial responsibility laws, payments from adult children are made to impoverished parents or their caregivers
- Joint custody
- Parental Alienation Syndrome
- Parenting plan
- Shared parenting
- List of largest divorce settlements
- Unfunded mandate

US-specific:

- Bradley Amendment
- California Child Support Guideline Review
- Child support in the United States
- Hermesmann v. Seyer

UK and Australia:

- Child Support Agency (UK)
- Child Support Agency Australia
- Shared residency in English law
- Children's centre

Canada:

- British Columbia Family Maintenance Enforcement Program

Historical:

- Childwite
