= 2000 in American television =

In American television in 2000, notable events included television series debuts, finales, cancellations, and channel initiations, closures and rebrandings, as well as information about controversies and disputes.

== Events ==
=== January ===
Date	Event
5	All My Children celebrates its 30th anniversary on ABC.
8	The series finale of Saved by the Bell: The New Class airs on NBC, ending a consecutive run for the Saved by the Bell franchise that began on July 11, 1987, when NBC broadcast the pilot for Good Morning, Miss Bliss. The franchise would remain dormant until 2020.
9	The pilot episode for Malcolm in the Middle is broadcast on Fox.
15	David Letterman undergoes quintuple heart bypass surgery in New York-Presbyterian Hospital, following an angiogram that revealed that one of his arteries was constricted seriously.
17	Robin Givens replaces Mother Love as host of the talk show series Forgive or Forget.

=== February ===
Date	Event
8	Chris-Craft Broadcasting (the 50% owner of UPN) files a lawsuit against Viacom in the New York Supreme Court to block its partner's merger with CBS, claiming that a pact signed between the two partners in 1997 had prevented either from owning "any interest, financial or otherwise" in "any competing network," including CBS, for a four-year period through January 2001. The following month, New York Supreme Court rules against Chris-Craft's move for a permanent injunction to curtail the Viacom-CBS merger and the enforcement of Viacom's ultimatum.
15	Rick Rockwell marries stranger Darva Conger watched by 22 million viewers on the Fox reality show Who Wants to Marry a Multi-Millionaire? While he and Darva are honeymooning, it becomes apparent that Rockwell — who is sometimes a comedian — had a restraining order against a former girlfriend, and is not really a multi-millionaire. As a result, Fox cancels a rerun scheduled the next week, and does not broadcast any new installments. In addition the couple end their relationship soon after the show's taping.
15	David Legler wins a combined $1,765,000 from the six episodes he has appeared in on the NBC game show Twenty One, surpassing Curtis Warren's total of $1,546,988, and becoming, at the time, the largest winner in game show winnings totals. (Warren had set the record 4 days earlier on Fox's Greed, winning $1,000,000 by correctly answering a special Million Dollar Moment question.)
21	David Letterman resumes hosting Late Show with David Letterman on CBS following his quintuple heart bypass surgery in January. On the show, Letterman (whose father died of heart failure in his 50s) brings all of the doctors that had performed the operation out on stage with him, including Dr. O. Wayne Isom and physician Louis Aronne, who makes frequent appearances on the show. In an unusual show of emotion, Letterman is nearly in tears as he thanks the doctors. The episode will earn an Emmy Award nomination.
18	Just as FCC's duopoly rules relax, Fox Television Stations buy out KDFI from Dallas Media Inventors, creating the first television duopoly to be owned by Fox (the same strategy is used when Fox buys the Chris-Craft company and WPWR-TV the following year).
22	Paramount Stations Group and ACME Communications sign an agreement to broadcast shared WB and UPN affiliations in markets without competition. This results in UPN affiliates WWHO in Columbus, Ohio, WTVX in West Palm Beach, Florida and WLWC in Providence, Rhode Island taking secondary WB affiliations, and WB affiliates WBUI-TV in Champaign, Illinois, WBXX in Knoxville, Tennessee, and KPLR-TV in St. Louis, Missouri taking secondary UPN affiliations.

=== March ===
Date	Event
20	Viacom acquires Chris-Craft Broadcasting's 50% share of UPN for $5 million, making Chris-Craft's UPN stations (including New York and Los Angeles) the network's de facto owned-and-operated flagship stations.

=== April ===
Date	Event
1	Boomerang, a Saturday-morning block from Cartoon Network, is launched as a cable television channel. The channel's visual identity (made by Primal Screen) would become well known for its bumpers involving vintage Hanna-Barbera toys from the 1960s to 1980s. The bumpers remain the same for almost fifteen years until the channel relaunches with a new logo in January 2015.
3	WWHO in Columbus, Ohio, and WLWC in Providence, Rhode Island, became primary UPN affiliates, and, eventually, secondary WB affiliates.
12	The Fox series Get Real airs its 20th and final aired episode (leaving 2 more unaired). Both Annie Hathaway and Jesse Eisenberg subsequently appear in successful movie roles.

=== May ===
Date	Event
1	The WWF receives the 2nd highest rated episode of Raw is War with a 7.4 rating, where The Rock defeats Shane McMahon.
14	After four years (since KEVN-TV left the network to join Fox in 1996), NBC returns to the Black Hills area of South Dakota when KNBN signs-on from Rapid City.
17	16.8 million American viewers watch the 2-hour final episode of Beverly Hills, 90210 on Fox.
19	The 27th Daytime Emmy Awards presentation is broadcast by ABC.
24	The WB broadcasts the third-season finale of Dawson's Creek, entitled "True Love". The episode features the first male gay kiss on American primetime television, which has been called "a milestone in the timeline of gay representation in pop culture".
31	The first season of CBS's long-running reality competition of Survivor, titled Survivor: Borneo, based on Sweden's game show Expedition Robinson, premieres its first episode. Sonja Christopher is the first contestant to be eliminated.

=== July ===
Date	Event
3	KNTV (channel 11) in San Jose, California drops its ABC affiliation for the Monterey Bay area and begins carrying minimal programming from The WB. (At this time, The WB affiliate for the Bay Area is KBWB channel 20).
5	The first season of CBS's long-running reality competition of Big Brother, based on the Dutch series of the same name, premieres its first episode. It is the only televised American season to use the traditional format to eliminate contestants via televoting; however, the season receives negative reception.
11	The Major League Baseball All-Star Game from Atlanta's Turner Field is broadcast on NBC. This ultimately proves to be NBC's final telecast of the "Midsummer Classic" to date. All subsequent Major League Baseball All-Star Games would air on Fox.
14	After over a year of rotating guest critics, Buena Vista Television announces that Richard Roeper, columnist for the Chicago Sun-Times, will become permanent co-host alongside Roger Ebert on the newly renamed program Ebert & Roeper and the Movies (renamed to Ebert & Roeper the following year) as successor to Gene Siskel (who dies from complications following his May 1998 brain surgery in early 1999).
15	CBS broadcasts its final NASCAR event, the Chevy Silverado 200. Dennis Setzer would win the race.
20	Will & Grace moves permanently to Thursday nights, ending two years of airing the series on different nights. On July 25, Frasier moves back to Tuesday nights after two years on Thursday nights due to competition from Who Wants to Be a Millionaire?, confirming the swap NBC had discussed their schedule in May.
28	Kathie Lee Gifford makes her final appearance as co-host on Live!, after 17 years (eleven and a half years for national syndication). Regis Philbin will continue to serve the only host until Kelly Ripa is introduced as new co-host the following year.

=== August ===
Date	Event
3	KBEJ Channel 2 (later KCWX) commences programming in Fredericksburg, Texas, taking the Austin market's UPN affiliation from low-powered station KVC 13 and returning full-time UPN service to San Antonio (between KRRT ( KMYS)'s switch to The WB in 1998 and KBEJ's sign-on, NBC affiliate KMOL-TV aired UPN programming on a secondary basis).
23	In CBS, corporate trainer Richard Hatch is declared the inaugural "Sole Survivor" in Survivor and wins the $1,000,000 grand prize; Kelly Wiglesworth is named the runner-up.

=== September ===
Date	Event
10	The 52nd Primetime Emmy Awards presentation is broadcast on ABC.
15	The 2000 Summer Olympics are televised by NBC. Opening ceremonies are watched by 27 and a half million viewers.
16	After the completion of Viacom's $37 billion merger with the CBS Corporation, the CBS Kidshow block is replaced with Nick Jr. on CBS, programmed by new corporate sister Nickelodeon.
21	ABC Sports celebrates the 30th anniversary of Monday Night Football on this night.
26	NBC declines to renew its broadcast agreement with Major League Baseball. After 50 seasons — 1947–1989 and 1994–2000 — Game 6 of the 2000 American League Championship Series is the last Major League Baseball game that NBC would televise for the next 22 years. The New York Yankees would defeat the Seattle Mariners 9–7 to advance to the World Series (which they would beat the New York Mets in five games). In Houston, due to the coverage of the 2000 Presidential Debate, KPRC-TV elects to carry NBC News' coverage of the debate while KNWS-TV carries NBC's final baseball game.
29	Eddie McGee wins the first American season of Big Brother and wins the $500,000 grand prize. It is the only season at the time the final vote was determined by public viewers instead of a jury vote.
30	PBS Kids Bookworm Bunch debuts. The block is programmed for PBS by Canada-based Nelvana, which had programmed the CBS Kidshow until the block was cancelled by CBS on September 16.

=== October ===
Date	Event
3	Jim Lehrer moderates the first 2000 presidential debate between Vice President Al Gore and Texas Governor George W. Bush at the University of Massachusetts Boston.
5	CNN's Bernard Shaw moderates the 2000 vice presidential debate with Senator Joe Lieberman and former Secretary of Defense Dick Cheney.
11	The second presidential debate is held at Wake Forest University.
17	NBC broadcasts Game 6 of the American League Championship Series between the New York Yankees and Seattle Mariners. With Bob Costas and Joe Morgan at the call, the Yankees would defeat the Mariners 9–7, to advance to the World Series against their cross–town rivals, the Mets. As previously mentioned, this proves to be NBC's final Major League Baseball telecast until the 2022 season.
17	Lehrer moderates the third and final presidential debate between Gore and Bush at Washington University in St. Louis.
20	On NBC, Ice-T and Stephanie March make their first appearances on Law & Order: Special Victims Unit as Junior Detective Odafin "Fin" Tutuola and Assistant District Attorney Alexandra Cabot respectively.
26	The Game 5 of the World Series airs on Fox. The New York Yankees win their third consecutive title (and first three-peat since the Oakland Athletics from 1972 to 1974) and 26th in franchise history, defeating their crosstown opponent the New York Mets 4–2.
30	Lancaster, Pennsylvania, college student Brad Rutter makes his historical first appearance in the Jeopardy! game show; he would go on set a record for its largest J! career winnings as of 2005 ($4,788,440), and as of 2020, becoming one of the largest winners in American game show history with winnings accumulating over $5,000,000, including $100,000 he won from Million Dollar Mind Game in 2014.
31	Charles Barkley makes his debut as an analyst on TBS/TNT's Inside the NBA.

=== November ===
Date	Event
4	The final episode of All That's first-run airs on Nickelodeon. After 13 episodes the show is put on hiatus. To keep the show running, the producers compile a series called Best of All That. Eventually, Nickelodeon cancels All That, due to crew disputes and a general desire to move on. However, All That still has a strong following and is one of the most popular shows on the network. Nickelodeon plans to revive the show, starting from scratch.

=== December ===
Date	Event
14	Barker's Beauties Janice Pennington and Kathleen Bradley both quit CBS' series The Price Is Right. (On her broadcast run, Pennington has been on the series since its premiere during 1972.) Starting the following day, auditions to find new Barker's Beauties are held for several months. In the end, Claudia Jordan and Heather Kozar are selected as permanent models.
22	Bianca Montgomery, played by Eden Riegel for the soap opera All My Children, reveals herself as a lesbian to her mother, Erica Kane (played by Susan Lucci).
31	ABC broadcasts "Dick Clark's Primetime New Year's Rockin' Eve" at 10 p.m. ET for the first time, followed by local news or programming and then the main "New Year's Rockin' Eve".

== Programs ==
=== Debuts ===
Date	Show	Network
January 3	Your Weather Today	The Weather Channel
January 8	Rainbow Fish	HBO
January 8	Winning Lines	CBS
January 9	Malcolm in the Middle	Fox
January 10	The Ainsley Harriott Show	Syndication
January 12	18 Wheels of Justice	TNN
January 12	Higher Ground	Fox Family
January 13	EGG, the Arts Show	PBS
January 16	City of Angels	CBS
January 17	I Dare You: The Ultimate Challenge	UPN
January 17	Cleopatra 2525	Syndication
January 22	Jack of All Trades	Syndication
January 24	Brutally Normal	The WB
January 24	Hollywood Showdown	PAX TV
January 24	Slime Time Live	Nickelodeon
February 5	The Others	NBC
February 11	Miracle Pets	PAX TV
February 12	Power Rangers Lightspeed Rescue	Fox Kids
February 16	Diary	MTV
February 25	Max Steel	Kids' WB
February 26	The Weekenders	ABC
March 5	Cover Me	USA Network
March 7	Secret Agent Man	UPN
March 9	God, the Devil and Bob	NBC
March 11	Caitlin's Way	Nickelodeon
March 14	Son of the Beach	FX
March 20	First Outlook	The Weather Channel
March 20	Titus	Fox
March 21	The Beat	UPN
March 22	Then Came You	ABC
March 23	Battery Park	NBC
March 23	Daddio	NBC
March 24	Making the Band	ABC
March 27	Crush	USA Network
March 30	Wonderland	ABC
March 31	Call of the Wild	Animal Planet
April 1	MasterChef USA	PBS
April 2	D.C.	The WB
April 3	Between the Lions	PBS Kids
April 3	The Dooley and Pals Show	Syndication
April 4	Falcone	CBS
April 11	Talk to Me	ABC
April 13	Food 911	Food Network
April 23	Genesis	PAX TV
April 30	A Walk In Your Shoes	Noggin
May 15	Secrets of the Dead	PBS
May 31	Clerks: The Animated Series	ABC
May 31	Survivor	CBS
June 5	Maggie and the Ferocious Beast	Nick Jr.
June 6	M.Y.O.B.	NBC
June 16	Strip Mall	Comedy Central
June 16	Totally Circus	Disney Channel
June 17	Even Stevens	Disney Channel
June 20	Shooting Gallery	Outdoor Channel
June 26	Spy Groove	MTV
June 26	Resurrection Blvd.	Showtime
June 28	Soul Food	Showtime
July 3	Masters of Illusion	PAX TV
July 5	Big Brother	CBS
July 10	Crossing Over with John Edward	Sci Fi
July 12	Young Americans	The WB
July 17	Opposite Sex	Fox
July 23	The Brothers García	Nickelodeon
July 23	Strong Medicine	Lifetime
July 23	The War Next Door	USA Network
July 24	Mysterious Ways	PAX TV
July 28	Baby Blues	The WB
August 8	Sammy	NBC
August 9	Live Through This	MTV
August 23	BattleBots	Comedy Central
August 14	Dora the Explorer	Nick Jr.
March 15	Oobi	Noggin
August 25	Encounters With the Unexplained	PAX TV
August 26	In a Heartbeat	Disney Channel
August 26	Generation O!	Kids' WB
September 4	Clifford the Big Red Dog	PBS Kids
September 4	Caillou	PBS Kids
September 4	Judge Hatchett	Syndication
September 9	Jackie Chan Adventures	Kids' WB
September 9	Teacher's Pet	ABC
September 11	106 & Park	BET
September 11	2 Minute Drill	ESPN
September 11	Dr. Laura	Syndication
September 11	Girlfriends	UPN
September 12	MTV Cribs	MTV
September 22	Grosse Pointe	The WB
September 22	Fear	MTV
September 23	Static Shock	Kids' WB
September 23	Just Deal	NBC
September 30	Corduroy	PBS Kids
September 30	Elliot Moose	PBS Kids
September 30	George Shrinks	PBS Kids
September 30	Marvin the Tap-Dancing Horse	PBS Kids
September 30	Seven Little Monsters	PBS Kids
September 30	Timothy Goes to School	PBS Kids
October 1	That's Life	CBS
October 1	Jackass	MTV
October 2	Buzz Lightyear of Star Command	UPN and ABC
October 2	Yes, Dear	CBS
October 2	Deadline	NBC
October 2	Tucker	NBC
October 2	History IQ	History
October 2	Gene Roddenberry's Andromeda	Syndication
October 2	Moral Court	Syndication
October 2	Street Smarts	Syndication
October 3	Dark Angel	Fox
October 4	Titans	NBC
October 5	Gilmore Girls	The WB
October 5	Pelswick	Nickelodeon
October 6	FreakyLinks	Fox
October 6	Madigan Men	ABC
October 6	The Trouble with Normal	ABC
October 6	CSI: Crime Scene Investigation	CBS
October 6	The Fugitive	CBS
October 7	The District	CBS
October 7	Noah Knows Best	Nickelodeon
October 7	Maximum Exposure	Syndication
October 7	Queen of Swords	Syndication
October 7	Sheena	Syndication
October 8	Ed	NBC
October 8	Hype	The WB
October 9	Nikki	The WB
October 10	The Geena Davis Show	ABC
October 10	Gideon's Crossing	ABC
October 11	Bette	CBS
October 11	Welcome to New York	CBS
October 11	A Makeover Story	TLC
October 13	Trading Spaces	TLC
October 15	Curb Your Enthusiasm	HBO
October 21	Cheaters	Syndication
October 21	The Fearing Mind	Fox Family
October 23	Scariest Places on Earth	Fox Family
October 23	Boston Public	Fox
October 24	The Michael Richards Show	NBC
October 25	As Told By Ginger	Nickelodeon
October 26	Cursed	NBC
October 27	Freedom	UPN
October 27	Level 9	UPN
November 1	Normal, Ohio	Fox
November 1	The Street	Fox
November 4	X-Men: Evolution	Kids' WB
November 14	DAG	NBC
November 17	Sheep in the Big City	Cartoon Network
December 3	The Living Century	PBS
December 3	Queer as Folk	Showtime
December 6	TV Funhouse	Comedy Central
December 7	The Jeff Corwin Experience	Animal Planet
December 8	Dot Comedy	ABC
December 8	Wolf Blitzer Reports	CNN
December 21	The Brak Show	Cartoon Network
December 21	Sealab 2021	Cartoon Network
December 30	Aqua Teen Hunger Force	Cartoon Network
December 30	Harvey Birdman, Attorney at Law	Cartoon Network

=== Returning this year ===
Show	Last aired	Previous network	New title	New network	Returning
Twenty One	1958	NBC	Same	NBC	January 9
Ripley's Believe It or Not!	1986	ABC	Same	TBS	January 12
Double Dare	1993	Nickelodeon, Fox	Double Dare 2000	Same	January 24
Grapevine	1992	CBS	Same	Same	February 28
Supermarket Sweep	1995	Lifetime	Same	PAX TV	April 3
Shop 'til You Drop	1998	The Family Channel	Same	PAX TV	April 3
Cartoon Cartoon Weekend	1999	Cartoon Network	The Cartoon Cartoon Show (Cartoon Cartoons or The Big Pick)	Same	June 9
This Week in Baseball	1998	Syndication	Same	Fox	July 12
To Tell the Truth	1991	NBC	Same	Syndication	September 18
The Critic	1995	Fox	Same	Comedy Central	November

=== Ending this year ===
Date	Show	Network	Debut	Status
January 1	Random Acts of Comedy	Fox Family	1999	Cancelled
January 5	It's Like, You Know...	ABC	1999	Cancelled
January 7	Odd Man Out	ABC	1999	Cancelled
January 8	The Brothers Flub	Nickelodeon	1999	Cancelled
January 8	Saved by the Bell: The New Class	NBC	1993	Ended
January 22	Science Court	ABC	1997	Cancelled
January 22	Flying Rhino Junior High	CBS	1998	Cancelled
January 22	KaBlam!	Nickelodeon	1996	Cancelled
January 30	Ace Ventura: Pet Detective	CBS	1995	Cancelled
February 4	Sliders	Sci Fi Channel	1995	Cancelled
February 12	Superman: The Animated Series	Kids' WB	1996	Cancelled
February 12	The New Batman/Superman Adventures	Kids' WB	1997	Cancelled
February 13	Linc's	Showtime	1998	Cancelled
February 14	Brutally Normal	The WB	2000	Cancelled
February 16	Noddy	PBS Kids	1998	Cancelled
February 18	Winning Lines	CBS	2000	Cancelled
February 19	Voltron: The Third Dimension	Syndication	1998	Cancelled
February 22	Pulp Comics	Comedy Central	1996	Cancelled
February 22	Archie's Weird Mysteries	PAX TV	1999	Cancelled
February 26	The Avengers: United They Stand	Fox Kids	1999	Cancelled
February 27	Animorphs	Nickelodeon	1998	Cancelled
March 2	I Am Weasel	Cartoon Network	1997	Cancelled
March 4	Oh Baby	Lifetime	1998	Cancelled
March 7	Gullah Gullah Island	Nickelodeon	1994	Cancelled
March 15	Tenacious D	HBO	1997	Cancelled
March 25	Detention	Kids' WB	1999	Cancelled
March 28	God, the Devil and Bob (returned in 2011)	NBC	2000	Cancelled
March 31	Histeria!	Kids' WB	1998	Cancelled
April 1	Crashbox	HBO Family	1999	Cancelled
April 3	Hope Island	PAX TV	1999	Cancelled
April 6	Wonderland	ABC	2000	Cancelled
April 9	Pacific Blue	USA Network	1996	Cancelled
April 12	Get Real	Fox	1999	Cancelled
April 12	Falcone	CBS	2000	Cancelled
April 13	Battery Park	NBC	2000	Cancelled
April 22	Godzilla: The Series	Fox Kids	1998	Cancelled
April 23	The Journey of Allen Strange	Nickelodeon	1997	Cancelled
April 23	The Beat	UPN	2000	Cancelled
April 25	D.C.	The WB	2000	Cancelled
April 25	Talk to Me	ABC	2000	Cancelled
April 26	Then Came You	ABC	2000	Cancelled
April 28	Cosby	CBS	1996	Cancelled
May 1	George and Martha	HBO Family	1999	Cancelled
May 3	Party of Five (returned in 2020)	Fox	1994	Ended
May 4	Chicago Hope	CBS	1994	Cancelled
May 5	Now and Again	ABC	1999	Cancelled
May 5	Boy Meets World (returned in 2014)	ABC	1993	Ended
May 5	A Little Curious	HBO	1998	Cancelled
May 11	Mobile Suit Gundam Wing	Cartoon Network	2000	Cancelled
May 12	G vs E	Sci Fi Channel	1999	Cancelled
May 13	The Pretender	NBC	1996	Cancelled
May 13	Martial Law	CBS	1998	Cancelled
May 16	Sports Night	ABC	1998	Cancelled
May 17	Beverly Hills, 90210 (returned in 2008)	Fox	1990	Cancelled
May 19	Harsh Realm	FX	1999	Cancelled
May 19	Donny & Marie	Syndication	1998	Cancelled
May 20	Malibu, CA	Syndication	1998	Cancelled
May 20	Pensacola: Wings of Gold	Syndication	1997	Cancelled
May 22	Grown Ups	UPN	1999	Cancelled
May 22	Malcolm & Eddie	UPN	1996	Cancelled
May 25	The Dooley and Pals Show	Syndication	2000	Cancelled
May 25	Jesse	NBC	1998	Cancelled
May 26	Forgive or Forget	Syndication	1998	Cancelled
May 26	Storytime with Thomas	Fox Family	1999	Cancelled
May 27	Early Edition	CBS	1996	Cancelled
May 28	Twenty-One	PAX TV	1956	Cancelled
May 30	I Dare You: The Ultimate Challenge	UPN	2000	Cancelled
June 9	The Dating Game	Syndication	1965	Cancelled
June 10	The Others	NBC	2000	Cancelled
June 11	Are You Afraid of the Dark? (returned in 2019)	Nickelodeon	1992	Cancelled
June 11	Zoe, Duncan, Jack and Jane	The WB	1999	Cancelled
June 16	Higher Ground	Fox Family	2000	Cancelled
June 21	Time of Your Life	Fox	1999	Cancelled
June 23	Kids Say the Darndest Things (returned in 2019)	CBS	1998	Cancelled
June 26	Call of the Wild	Animal Planet	2000	Cancelled
June 27	M.Y.O.B.	NBC	2000	Cancelled
June 27	Veronica's Closet	NBC	1997	Cancelled
July 1	Profiler	NBC	1996	Cancelled
July 3	The Magnificent Seven	CBS	1998	Cancelled
July 7	The Strip	UPN	1999	Cancelled
July 8	Freaks and Geeks	Fox Family	1999	Cancelled
July 13	Stark Raving Mad	NBC	1999	Cancelled
July 15	Kenan & Kel	Nickelodeon	1996	Cancelled
July 16	Mission Hill (returned in 2002)	The WB	1999	Cancelled
July 18	Happily Ever After: Fairy Tales for Every Child	HBO	1995	Cancelled
July 18	Love & Money	CBS	1999	Cancelled
July 25	Dilbert	UPN	1999	Cancelled
July 28	Secret Agent Man	UPN	2000	Cancelled
August 1	Shasta McNasty	UPN	1999	Cancelled
August 18	WCW Saturday Night	TBS	1971	Cancelled
August 24	Baby Blues (returned in 2002)	The WB	2000	Cancelled
August 30	Young Americans	The WB	2000	Cancelled
September 1	Jep!	GSN	1998	Cancelled
September 2	The Bugs Bunny Show	ABC	1960	Cancelled
September 4	Opposite Sex	Fox	2000	Cancelled
September 24	Totally Circus	Disney Channel	2000	Cancelled
September 24	The War Next Door	USA Network	2000	Cancelled
October 2	Strangers with Candy	Comedy Central	1999	Cancelled
October 6	ECW on TNN	The Nashville Network	1999	Cancelled
October 17	Major League Baseball on NBC (returned in 2022)	NBC	1947	Cancelled
October 23	PB&J Otter	Playhouse Disney	1998	Cancelled
October 23	Daddio	NBC	2000	Cancelled
October 23	Tucker	NBC	2000	Cancelled
November 10	The Trouble with Normal	ABC	2000	Cancelled
November 10	Double Dare 2000 (returned in 2018)	Nickelodeon	1986	Cancelled
November 18	Pepper Ann	UPN	1997	Cancelled
November 18	Power Rangers Lightspeed Rescue	Fox Kids	2000	Cancelled
November 18	Beast Machines	Fox Kids	1999	Cancelled
November 24	The Roseanne Show	Syndication	1998	Cancelled
November 25	The Chris Rock Show	HBO	1997	Cancelled
December 2	The Fearing Mind	Fox Family	2000	Cancelled
December 2	Jack of All Trades	Syndication	2000	Cancelled
December 8	Dot Comedy	ABC	2000	Cancelled
December 13	Normal, Ohio	Fox	2000	Cancelled
December 13	The Street	Fox	2000	Cancelled
December 15	Madigan Men	ABC	2000	Cancelled
December 16	Hang Time	NBC	1995	Cancelled
December 16	Mickey Mouse Works	ABC	1999	Cancelled
December 17	Adventures from the Book of Virtues	PBS	1996	Cancelled
December 18	Titans	NBC	2000	Cancelled
December 19	The Michael Richards Show	NBC	2000	Cancelled
December 21	City of Angels	CBS	2000	Cancelled
December 26	Suddenly Susan	NBC	1996	Cancelled
December 31	ECW Hardcore TV	Syndication	1993	Cancelled

=== Entering syndication this year ===
Show	Seasons	In Production	Source
7th Heaven	September 4, 2000 - June 4, 2004	Yes	
Cosby	September 11, 2000 - August 22, 2004	No	
Early Edition	September 4, 2000 - September 15, 2002	No	
The Jamie Foxx Show	October 2, 2000 - January 10, 2015	Yes	
Moesha	October 2, 2000 - February 8, 2015	Yes	
Nash Bridges	September 25, 2000 - August 17, 2003	Yes	
The Pretender	September 18, 2000 - June 27, 2004	No	
Sabrina the Teenage Witch	September 18, 2000 - June 11, 2006	Yes	
Spin City	October 2, 2000 - September 23, 2005	Yes	
Suddenly Susan	October 2, 2000 - December 29, 2003	No	

=== Changes of network affiliation ===
Show	Moved from	Moved to
Forensic Files	TLC	Court TV
Budgie the Little Helicopter	Fox Kids	Fox Family
The Hughleys	ABC	UPN
Ripley's Believe It or Not!	ABC	TBS
Sabrina the Teenage Witch	ABC	The WB
The PJs	Fox	The WB
This Week in Baseball	Syndication	Fox
Macy's Fourth of July Fireworks Spectacular	Syndication	NBC
Twenty One	NBC	Pax TV
Supermarket Sweep	Lifetime	Pax TV
Shop 'til You Drop	Fox Family	Pax TV
WWF Raw Is War	USA Network	TNN
WWF LiveWire	USA Network	TNN
WWF Superstars	USA Network	TNN
WWF Sunday Night Heat	USA Network	MTV
To Tell the Truth	NBC	Syndication
The Critic	Fox	Comedy Central

=== Miniseries ===
Title	Channel	Premiere
The 10th Kingdom	NBC	February 27
The Corner	HBO	April 16
Arabian Nights	ABC	April 30
Jesus	CBS	May 14

== Networks and services ==
=== Launches ===
Network	Type	Launch date	Notes	Source
Hispanic Television Network	Cable television	Unknown		
VH1 Uno	Cable and satellite	Unknown		
BYU TV	Cable and satellite	January 1		
PBS YOU	Cable television	January 15		
Soapnet	Cable and satellite	January 20		
Oxygen	Cable and satellite	February 2		
V-Me	Cable television	March 5		
Boomerang	Cable and satellite	April 1	Boomerang was originally a programming block on Cartoon Network, which continued until 2004.	
New Urban Entertainment Television	Cable television	July 17		
Azteca America	Cable television	July 28		
Venevisión Continental	Cable television	August 28		
HBO Latino	Cable television	November 1		
RFD-TV	Cable and satellite	December 1		

=== Conversions and rebrandings ===
Old network name	New network name	Type	Conversion Date	Notes	Source
SportsChannel Florida	Fox Sports Net Florida	Cable television	March 1		
VH1 Classic Rock	VH1 Classic	Cable and satellite	May 8		
CBS Telenoticias	Telemundo Internacional	Cable television	September		
ZDTV	TechTV	Cable and satellite	September 18		
The Nashville Network	The National Network	Cable television	September 25		
ValueVision	ShopNBC	Cable television	November		

=== Closures ===
Network name	Type	Closure Date	Notes	Source
Discovery People	Cable television	Unknown		
Z Music Television	Cable television	Unknown		
Boyz Channel	Cable television	August 18		
Girlz Channel	Cable television	August 18		
Romance Classics	Cable and satellite	December 31		

== Television stations ==
=== Station launches ===
Date	City of License/Market	Station	Channel	Affiliation	Notes/Ref.
January 3	Palm Springs, California	KPSE-LP	38	UPN	
April 23	Orlando, Florida	WRDQ	27	Independent	
May 24	Scranton, Pennsylvania	W26CD	26	TBN	
May 25	Stuart/West Palm Beach, Florida	WHDT	9	Deutsche Welle	
June 17	Grand Junction, Colorado	KFQX	4	Fox	
June 19	Eureka Springs/Fort Smith, Arkansas	KWBS-TV	34	Pax TV	
June 19	Syracuse, New York	WAWA-LP	14	Independent	
August 3	San Antonio, Texas	KBEJ	2	UPN	
September 6	Tacoma/Seattle, Washington	KWDK	56	Daystar	
October 1	Duluth, Minnesota	K60EZ	60	UPN (primary); AIN (secondary)	
October 18	Wichita Falls, Texas	KUWF-LP	36	Univision	
November	Grand Forks, North Dakota	KXJC-LP	35	CBS	
November 24	Montgomery, Alabama	WRJM-TV	67	UPN	
December	Flagstaff, Arizona	KTFL	4	FamilyNet	
December	Los Angeles, California	KXLA	44	America One	
December 12	Orlando, Florida	WLCB-TV	45	Christian independent	
December 20	Flagstaff, Arizona	KCFG	9	America One	
Unknown date	Binghamton, New York	W10CO	10	UPN	
Unknown date	Calipatria, California	KAJB	54	Independent	
Unknown date	Christiansted, U.S. Virgin Islands	WVIF	15	Pax TV	
Unknown date	Farmington, New Mexico	KOBG-TV	6	NBC	Satellite of KOB-TV/Albuquerque
Unknown date	Fond du Lac, Wisconsin	WMMF-TV	68	FamilyNet	
Unknown date	Madison, Wisconsin	WISC-DT2	3.2 (digital)	The WB	Over-the-air digital relaunch of the cable-only TVW; one of the first digital subchannels to launch in the United States
Unknown date	Naples/Fort Myers, Florida	W43AY	43	Telemundo	
Unknown date	Las Vegas, Nevada	KNVV-LP	41	Univision	
Unknown date	Sioux Falls, South Dakota	KAUN	36	Pax TV	

== Births ==
Date	Name	Notability
January 7	Marcus Scribner	Actor (Black-ish, She-Ra and the Princesses of Power)
January 8	Noah Cyrus	Actress (Hannah Montana) and daughter of Billy Ray Cyrus
January 20	Montse Hernandez	Voice actress (Gwen Tennyson on Ben 10)
January 26	Anthony Turpel	Actor (Love, Victor)
January 28	Julia Lester	Actress (High School Musical: The Musical: The Series)
February 1	Paris Smith	Actress (Every Witch Way)
February 10	Yara Shahidi	Actress (Black-ish, Grown-ish)
February 23	Christian Martyn	Canadian actor (Anne With An E, Home Alone: The Holiday Heist)
February 25	Angelina Wahler	Voice actress (Fee on Harvey Beaks)
February 25	Tucker Albrizzi	Actor (Big Time Rush, Good Luck Charlie)
March 5	Gabby Barrett	Singer (American Idol)
March 6	Jacob Bertrand	Actor (Bubble Guppies, Marvin Marvin, Kirby Buckets, Cobra Kai)
March 21	Jace Norman	Actor (Henry Danger, The Adventures of Kid Danger, Danger Force)
March 27	Sophie Nélisse	Canadian actress (Yellowjackets)
March 30	Regan Mizrahi	Voice actor (Boots on Dora the Explorer (2008–12))
April 3	Ella Bleu Travolta	Actress, singer and daughter of John Travolta and Kelly Preston
April 8	Ella Beatty	Actress and daughter of Warren Beatty and Annette Bening
May 4	Amara Miller	Actress
May 7	Maxwell Perry Cotton	Actor (Brothers & Sisters)
May 18	Addison Holley	Actress
May 30	Jared S. Gilmore	Actor (Once Upon a Time)
May 31	Gable Steveson	Wrestler
June 2	Lilimar Hernandez	Venezuelan actress (Bella and the Bulldogs, Knight Squad)
June 13	Daniella Perkins	Actress (Legendary Dudas, Knight Squad)
June 17	Odessa A'zion	Actress (Fam, Grand Army)
June 22	Maliq Johnson	Actor (Grand Army)
July 8	Benjamin Stockham	Actor (Sons of Tucson, 1600 Penn, About a Boy)
July 19	Owen Joyner	Actor (100 Things to Do Before High School, Knight Squad)
July 25	Mason Cook	Actor (Speechless)
July 25	Meg Donnelly	Actress (American Housewife) and singer
July 27	Savannah Lee Smith	Actress (Gossip Girl)
August 3	Landry Bender	Actress (Crash & Bernstein, Best Friends Whenever, The Lion Guard, Looking for Alaska)
August 3	Chandler Kinney	Actress (Zombies 2, Pretty Little Liars)
August 5	Augie Isaac	Actor (Mighty Med)
August 12	Savannah May	Actress (Knight Squad)
August 19	Trenton Rogers	Voice actor (Leo on Little Einsteins (2007–09))
August 20	Fátima Ptacek	Voice actress (Dora the Explorer, Dora and Friends: Into the City!)
August 24	Griffin Gluck	Actor (Private Practice, Red Band Society)
August 26	Brady Reiter	Actress (100 Things to Do Before High School)
September 28	Frankie Jonas	Actor (Jonas)
September 28	Brenna D'Amico	Actress (Descendants: Wicked World)
September 12	Laine Hardy	Singer (American Idol)
September 30	Amina Alzouma	Actress (I Am Frankie)
October 10	Aedin Mincks	Actor (A.N.T. Farm)
October 11	Hayden Byerly	Actor (The Fosters)
October 13	Gail Soltys	Actress (Talia in the Kitchen)
October 14	Mekai Curtis	Actor (Kirby Buckets, Milo Murphy's Law)
October 31	Willow Smith	Actress, singer and daughter of Will Smith and Jada Pinkett Smith
November 7	Dara Reneé	Actress (High School Musical: The Musical: The Series)
November 8	Jade Pettyjohn	Actress (School of Rock)
November 10	Mackenzie Foy	Actress
November 11	Kristi Beckett	Actress (I Am Frankie)
November 13	Armani Barrett	Actor (I Am Frankie)
November 22	Ariel Martin	Actress and singer
November 22	Auliʻi Cravalho	Actress and singer
December 16	Lance Lim	Actor (School of Rock)
December 21	Lucas Jade Zumann	Actor (Anne With An E, Sinister 2, 20th Century Women)
December 22	Joshua Bassett	Actor (High School Musical: The Musical: The Series)

== Deaths ==
Date	Name	Age	Notability
January 15	Fran Ryan	83	American character actress (Doris Ziffle #2 on Green Acres)
January 16	By Saam	85	American sportscaster
January 18	Nancy Coleman	87	American film, stage, television and radio actress
January 18	Jester Hairston	98	American composer, songwriter, arranger, choral conductor, and actor (Amen)
February 10	Jim Varney	50	American actor; creator of the Ernest P. Worrell character (Hey Vern, It's Ernest!)
February 12	Charles M. Schulz	77	American cartoonist, creator of Peanuts
March 11	Alex Dreier	83	American news reporter
March 15	Durward Kirby	88	American television host and announcer
March 25	Helen Martin	90	American character actress (Pearl Shay on 227)
April 10	Larry Linville	60	American actor (Major Frank Burns on M*A*S*H)
April 12	Christopher Pettiet	24	American television and film actor (The Young Riders)
May 7	Douglas Fairbanks Jr.	90	American actor and producer (Douglas Fairbanks Presents), son of Douglas Fairbanks
May 10	Craig Stevens	81	American film and television actor (Peter Gunn)
June 18	Nancy Marchand	71	American actress (Livia Soprano on The Sopranos, Mrs. Pynchon on Lou Grant)
July 1	Walter Matthau	79	American actor and comedian
July 14	Meredith MacRae	56	American actress and singer (Billie Jo Bradley #3 on Petticoat Junction)
July 28	Jaime Cardriche	32	American actor (Malcolm & Eddie)
August 12	Loretta Young	87	American actress (The Loretta Young Show)
September 14	Beah Richards	80	American stage, screen, and television actress
September 26	Richard Mulligan	67	American television and film actor (Burt Campbell on Soap, Dr. Harry Weston on Empty Nest)
October 6	Richard Farnsworth	80	American actor and stuntman
October 9	David Dukes	55	American actor
October 16	Rick Jason	77	American actor (Lt. Gil Hanley on Combat!)
October 18	Julie London	74	American singer and actress (Nurse Dixie McCall on Emergency!)
October 30	Steve Allen	78	American comedian, composer (original The Tonight Show host)
December 2	Gail Fisher	65	American actress (Peggy Fair on Mannix)
December 6	Werner Klemperer	80	German-American actor (Colonel Wilhelm Klink on Hogan's Heroes)
December 12	George Montgomery	84	American actor, director, producer, writer and stuntman
December 23	Victor Borge	91	Danish comedian and pianist
December 26	Jason Robards	78	American stage, film and television actor (The Day After)

== See also ==
- 2000 in the United States
- List of American films of 2000
