= NUE =

NUE or Nue may refer to:

- Nuremberg Airport's IATA code
- Nucor, an American steel making company's NYSE stock symbol
- New Urban Entertainment Television, a defunct American cable network targeting African-Americans
- Nue, a Japanese legendary creature
- Nue (album), a 2001 album by Lara Fabian
- Nitrogen use efficiency, the ratio between the amount of nitrogen taken up by a crop and the amount present in the soil
- Nue Houjuu, a fictional character from Undefined Fantastic Object in the video game series Touhou Project

== See also ==
- NNUE, a neural network-based evaluation function for strategy game engines
