= WAST-LP (Wisconsin) =

Television station in Ashland, Wisconsin (1997–2006)

- Ashland, Wisconsin; United States
- Channels: Analog: 25 (UHF)
- Branding: True North TV-25

Programming
- Affiliations: America One (1997–2005); UPN (2005–2006)

Ownership
- Owner: Martinsen Investments; (True North T.V. 25 LLC)

History
- Founded: January 12, 1995
- First air date: May 14, 1997
- Last air date: August 1, 2006 (license canceled on January 3, 2014)
- Former call signs: W25CA (1995–2000)
- Call sign meaning: Wisconsin Ashland Television

Technical information
- Licensing authority: FCC
- Facility ID: 8612
- Class: TX
- ERP: 52 kW
- HAAT: 163 m (535 ft)
- Transmitter coordinates: 46°41′16.98″N 90°54′23.05″W

Links
- Public license information: LMS

WAST-LP (channel 25) was a low-power television station in Ashland, Wisconsin, United States. The station was a semi-satellite of the UPN-affiliated second digital subchannel of KBJR-TV in Duluth, Minnesota, then-called Northland UPN and Northland 9, but was owned by a separate entity, Martinsen Investments. WAST-LP sold local advertising specifically for the Ashland area, preempting KBJR-DT2's advertising breaks.

Since 1997, WAST-LP had been owned by Superior Water Logged Lumber. It struggled financially. A 2001 attempt to sell the station to ESI Broadcasting Corporation of Montana failed; ESI hoped to combine the station with KDUL-LP, then Duluth's UPN affiliate. The station then went off the air.

In December 2005, Hank Martinsen and Julie Nuutinen put WAST-LP back on the air. The station featured two daily newscasts focusing on Wisconsin-area news. It had news sharing agreements with KBJR-TV and KUWS radio in Superior. The effort was short-lived. On May 2, news director Julie Moravchik was fired; she claimed she was dismissed for not making ownership-ordered staffing cuts. Newsroom employees refused to work for anyone else; 10 of them were fired the following day. To fill the void, newscast replays from KDLH-TV, commonly operated with KBJR, were added to the station's programming. Moravchik was then hired to set up the newsroom at KQDS-TV in Duluth.

On August 1, 2006, the station ended operations and went off the air, a month short of KBJR-DT2's conversion to MyNetworkTV. Despite being off the air for eight years, long after most stations licenses are canceled for not broadcasting, WAST-LP's license remained active until January 3, 2014, when its previous license to broadcast was fully exhausted.
