= List of Kirby Buckets episodes =

Kirby Buckets is an American comedy television series that aired on Disney XD from October 20, 2014 to February 2, 2017. Although a live-action series, the series also includes animated cartoon sequences of Kirby's drawings. The series stars Jacob Bertrand, Olivia Stuck, Mekai Curtis, Cade Sutton, and Tiffany Espensen.

== Series overview ==
Season	Episodes	Originally released	
Season	Episodes	First released	Last released
1	21	October 20, 2014	August 19, 2015
2	25	October 7, 2015	August 29, 2016
3	13	January 16, 2017	February 2, 2017

== Episodes ==
=== Season 1 (2014–15) ===
No. overall	No. in season	Title	Directed by	Written by	Original release date	Prod. code	U.S. viewers (millions)
1	1	"Cars, Buses and Lawnmowers"	Walt Becker	Mike Alber & Gabe Snyder	October 20, 2014	101	0.69
Kirby learns about a character design contest, with the prize being a chance to meet Mac McCallister in addition to winners being able to show their animated character on TV. He planned to go with Fish and Eli, but when they are stuck at school shortly before the contest, they have a plan that puts them in "Clown Town," an abandoned area of the city where creepy clowns live. Meanwhile, Dawn is angry at Kirby for using an embarrassing drawing of her titled "Dawnzilla" as his submission for the contest, so she and Belinda attempt to stop him. Dawn later wants it because she wants to be popular, only to get made fun of at school.
2	2	"Flice of the Living Dead"	Savage Steve Holland	Shawn Simmons	October 27, 2014	105	0.46
Kirby and their friends are old enough to attend the Forest Hills Ninth Annual Fright Night Film Festival. However, when their biology teacher accidentally breaks open a container of Forest Hills Super Flice, the principal keeps the class within the school and they aren't able to attend. Meanwhile, Dawn and Belinda are invited to a Halloween party hosted by Evan, one of the coolest kids in school; however, the party was for Evan's little bro. Kirby chooses not to go to Fright Fest in the end.
3	3	"The Legend of Prank Williams, Jr."	David Kendall	Joe Stillman	November 3, 2014	TBA	0.53
Every year the people of Forest Hills celebrate a special holiday called Prank Williams Jr. Day, in which the townsfolk prank each other to honor Prank Williams Jr. Every year Dawn always pranks Kirby and no matter how hard he tries he can't get back at her. But this year, he finds out about the ultimate prank created by Prank Williams Jr. himself called: "The Jeffery". Which he hopes will put Dawn in her place.
4	4	"The Year of Fridays"	Walt Becker	Kristofor Brown	November 10, 2014	TBA	0.47
Kirby plans to spend his 52nd consecutive Friday night with Fish and Eli to mark a full year of Friday nights together. However, Kirby is grounded for defacing a poster of Dawn's favorite boy band, Ume4evr (you me forever). While Kirby and his father stay at home, his mother takes Dawn and Belinda to spend a night at the same hotel where Ume4evr is staying, to make up for failing to get tickets to their show. Kirby manages to spend Friday night with Fish and Eli by inviting them to his house after his father goes to sleep. However, they inadvertently wake his father while noisily playing a video game. Fish and Eli hide, while Kirby says that he was having a difficult time sleeping and decided to play a game. Kirby's father decides that he and Kirby will sleep outside in a tent, saying that it will help him fall asleep by being out of the house. The next morning, Kirby's father discovers evidence that someone was in the house, while Kirby finds that Fish and Eli have not left yet. Kirby's father has a policeman, Sergeant Pounder, come to the house to investigate what he believes to be a break-in. On bicycles, Kirby leads Fish and Eli away from the house. Pounder spots the children and believes they are the burglars, but they evade him after a police chase.
5	5	"Kirby Almighty"	Savage Steve Holland	Joe Stillman	November 17, 2014	TBA	0.46
During a spitball fight at school, Kirby accidentally hits a bully known as Pearly Todd, who has large teeth. Todd then threatens to get revenge on Kirby. Later, Kirby finds a pen at school and begins using it. Several of Kirby's drawings wind up coming true in reality, which leads Kirby, Fish and Eli to believe that the pen is magical and has the ability to make things happen. Meanwhile, Dawn keeps getting her outfit dirty on the day that she is to have a school picture taken. Dawn is initially dismissive of Belinda's suggestion that Kirby is using a magical pen to sabotage her picture, but she eventually decides to steal the pen. Dawn sketches a drawing of how she wants her school picture to turn out, but she becomes upset at her poor drawing and decides to forget the pen. Meanwhile, Kirby is put up against Todd in a school wrestling match, and he is distraught to learn that the magical pen is missing. Fish and Eli find the pen and toss it to Kirby during his wrestling match so he can use it to his advantage. Todd notices Kirby's Todd drawing and tells him that he wishes people would stop mocking his large teeth. Kirby and Todd then forgive each other. Guest star: Austin Fryberger as Pearly Todd
6	6	"Killer Puppies"	Walt Becker	Mike Alber & Gabe Snyder	November 24, 2014	102	0.45
Kirby accidentally burns a food dish in his home economics class and then fakes an illness to avoid being punished by Coach Batchelder, who is in charge of the class and disciplines students by making them do push-ups. The school nurse, Nurse Hearse, diagnoses Kirby with a deadly disease known as Peripheral Uvular Para-Patellum Interpullar Esophatoric Syndrome (P.U.P.P.I.E.S.). Kirby continues to fake his illness so he can receive special treatment at school. Meanwhile, Dawn is upset that Mandy McDaniels is now the most popular girl in school because of her charitable contributions. Mandy decides to throw a school event for Kirby to raise awareness about P.U.P.P.I.E.S. At the event, Dawn attempts to expose the truth about Kirby's illness by having him eat pig intestines, as one of the symptoms of P.U.P.P.I.E.S. is the inability to taste anything. When Kirby refuses to eat the intestines, Dawn believes that she has succeeded until Nurse Hearse declares that he has been cured of P.U.P.P.I.E.S. Meanwhile, Eli does well in his home economics class with the help of a rat who is a picky eater; and Fish wants to ask out local news reporter Samantha Foxworthy to an upcoming school dance. Foxworthy covers Kirby's event for the news, but Fish misses his opportunity to ask her out, and Eli's rat temporarily gets loose during the event, causing a brief panic. Guest stars: Michael Naughton as Dad, Mark Christopher Lawrence as Coach Batchelder, Paula Sorge as Nurse Hearse, Jessalyn Wanlim as Samantha Foxworthy, Keely Marshall as Mandy McDaniels, Elliott James Thomas Moore as Jean Luc
7	7	"Art Attack"	Steven Tsuchida	Nicole Shabtai	December 1, 2014	TBA	0.53
Kirby forgets to create a project to submit for his school's upcoming student art fair, Art-mageddon. At the last minute, Kirby sketches a poor drawing of a cat, which is rejected by his art teacher, Mrs. Statsky. Kirby meets a man named Shard, an artist who is impressed by the cat drawing. Shard introduces Kirby to his artist friends, and Kirby decides to join the group. Meanwhile, Dawn discovers that Eli used to be a fashion model, so she forces him to accompany her to a fashion shoot with hopes that he can help her become a model. Eli's former fashion agent, Kourtney, mostly ignores Dawn while insisting that Eli model a new wearable blanket. With no one to talk to, Fish is lonely and befriends a talking stuffed frog toy. Shard reveals to Kirby that his friends will be disrupting the Art-mageddon as revenge against Mrs. Statsky, who had rejected artwork done by him and his friends. Shard and his group plan to use a painting that will shoot paint onto the other projects at the art fair. When Kirby declines to help carry out the plot, he is locked in a maintenance closet and contacts Fish and Eli for help. Eli leaves the photoshoot, and Dawn models the wearable blanket, but she is rejected. Fish and Eli free Kirby, and Eli then models the stuffed frog toy as a hat, to distract the art fair attendees while Kirby sabotages Shard's plot. Kirby later creates a new animated character named Dippy the Frog. Guest stars: Connor Del Rio as Shard, Nathan Barnatt as Wild Gil, Elizabeth Ho as Kourtney Kang; Co-star: Melissa Greenspan as Mrs. Statsky; Absent: Tiffany Espensen as Belinda
8	8	"Kirby's Choice"	Steven Tsuchida	Ed Bedrosian	February 2, 2015	107	N/A
In a radio contest, Kirby wins two tickets to the Z3 video game convention, but he has difficulty deciding which friend to take with him: Fish or Eli. Kirby envisions what it would be like if he took Fish to the convention. In this scenario, Fish has Z3 founder Larry Zantron look at his notebook containing ideas for a video game. However, Zantron takes the notebook without intention to credit Fish for the game, so Kirby helps Fish retrieve the notebook. Fish ultimately feels flattered that someone like Zantron would be interested in his ideas enough to steal them, so he allows Zantron to keep the notebook. Kirby also imagines taking Eli to Z3. In this scenario, Eli realizes that Nancy, his virtual wife from an online life simulation game, is at the convention working as a security guard. Eli wants to divorce his troublesome wife, but he does not want to upset her, so he has Kirby deliver the news to her instead. Nancy becomes upset and chases Kirby and Eli throughout the convention. In both scenarios, Kirby wants to become famous by playing all 123 games at the convention, a feat that has never been accomplished; however, his goal is disrupted in both instances. Kirby decides to let Fish and Eli go to the convention without him. Meanwhile, Dawn wants an expensive hat, so she gets a job at Z3 in which she dresses up as an axe-wielding character known as Axe Girl, who is disliked by most people at the convention. When young children attack Dawn with fake swords, she fights back with her fake axe, leading her boss Ceith to fire her. Guest stars: Timm Sharp as Larry Zantron, Eric Isenhower as Ceith, Grace Bannon as Nancy Absent: Tiffany Espensen as Belinda
9	9	"Mac's Back"	Eyal Gordin	Mike Alber & Gabe Snyder	February 9, 2015	111	N/A
Kirby, Eli and Fish are upset over the cancellation of their favorite television show, Big Bald Oaf, which is about a heavy bald man who enjoys eating chili. They learn that the show creator, Mac McCallister, had a disagreement with his executive boss, Bob, who did not believe that the show's use of chili was funny; in response, Mac poured chili onto Bob's head. Mac, depressed after the show's cancellation, has grown long hair and a beard, and is now living in a cardboard box. Kirby and his friends arrange for Bob to visit Forest Hills so Mac can apologize to him and get the show back on the air. When Mac tells the children that he will not apologize, Kirby has his father pose as Mac instead. Mac arrives and foils Kirby's plan, although they eventually convince Bob to bring the show back. Meanwhile, at school, Dawn believes that she has a spider in her hair and flails her arms around erratically to get it off. Dawn's movements are filmed by several students who then upload the footage onto the Internet, giving her unwanted fame as the creator of a new craze known as Dawning, in which other children mimic her arm flailing. Guest stars: Michael Naughton as Dad, Michael Daniel Cassady as Mac McCallister, Phil Morris as Bob Bruchow
10	10	"Kick the Buckets"	David Kendall	Joe Stillman	February 23, 2015	109	0.49
When Kirby is wrongly accused by Principal Mitchell of adding cartoon graffiti to the walls at school, he teams up with Dawn, the new class constable, to find the person who really did it to prove his innocence and keep himself from being expelled. During their investigation, Dawn and Kirby reminisce to a time when they got along years earlier, in which they teamed up to solve a mystery of who was eating their mother's favorite cheese snacks; the culprit was a boy named Stubby McHale. When Kirby and Dawn come up empty-handed in their current investigation, Kirby loses his school cartoonist job to Jean Luc and Dawn loses her gold star sticker as class constable. Dawn and Kirby then discover that Dawn's school crush, a bad boy named Carver, had defaced the property and framed Kirby to get revenge on him. Carver reveals himself to be Stubby. He says that Dawn had told him years ago that Kirby framed him for eating the cheese snacks. After Stubby was framed, his family moved away before recently returning to Forest Hills, at which point he had changed his name to Carver. Stubby is expelled from school, but Kirby does not get his cartoonist job back, as Mitchell considers Jean Luc's cartoons to be better. Meanwhile, Fish is impressed with Eli's new arm wrestling skill and puts him in multiple matches at school to prove he is strong. Guest stars: Stephen Kearin as Principal Mitchell, Glenn McCuen as Carver, Elliott James Thomas Moore as Jean Luc Absent: Tiffany Espensen as Belinda
11	11	"It's a Brad, Brad, Brad, Brad World"	Eyal Gordin	Shawn Simmons	March 16, 2015	110	0.37
Kirby accidentally drops his burrito and his phone in a school toilet and then inadvertently flushes it, causing it to clog. Dave the Ripper, a student who mocks other children, nicknames Kirby "The Turdinator" for clogging the toilet. To avoid passing by Dave after school, Kirby, Fish and Eli take an alternate route through the Bradlands, the name given to an abandoned part of Forest Hills that is only inhabited by people named Brad, according to a local myth. Eli takes some pin buttons that he finds in the Bradlands, and the buttons become popular among the students. Kirby returns to the Bradlands and takes the remaining buttons, which he gives to students to improve his reputation following the toilet clogging incident. Although Kirby's plan works, Gil warns him to return the buttons. Gil reveals that he used to be a Brad before he changed his name, and that Brads are bad and arrogant people. Later, a man named Brad reveals that he and other Brads have kidnapped Gil and will not release him unless the buttons are returned. Kirby and his friends return the buttons and rescue Gil. Meanwhile, Dawn signs up for a school counseling program, but she is removed from the position because she only took it so she could learn gossip and secrets from other students. Guest stars: Nathan Barnatt as Wild Gil, Adam Hagenbuch as Brad, Noland Ammon as Dave the Ripper
12	12	"Gimme Some Room"	Alex Winter	Nicole Shabtai	March 23, 2015	112	N/A
When Kirby's father clears out his exercise room, Kirby and Dawn have their own ideas on how the room should be used. Dawn wants to turn it into a room where the family can apply skin bronzer, while Kirby wants to turn it into a "break room" where they can go to relieve their anger by breaking things. Kirby's idea is chosen. Later, Pearly Todd discovers that Dawn is Kirby's sister and then demands that Kirby arrange a date between him and Dawn, who takes advantage of her new fake relationship. Dawn has Todd intimidate Kirby into converting the break room into a bronzing room. Hoping to end the relationship, Kirby throws a surprise party for Todd and Dawn at the house. When Todd attempts to kiss Dawn, she rejects him and confesses that she only used him to get her bronzing room. Kirby sympathizes with Todd and encourages him to relieve his anger in the old break room, which is restored. Meanwhile, Fish is tired of Eli being an overly nice pushover, so he gives Eli a fur coat and encourages him to adopt an attitude. However, Eli becomes more aggressive towards people than Fish had wanted. On his way to the break room, Todd takes the coat from Eli, returning him to normal. Guest stars: Michael Naughton as Dad, Suzi Barrett as Mom, Austin Fryberger as Pearly Todd Absent: Tiffany Espensen as Belinda
13	13	"Day of the Cat"	Jay Karas	Steve Leff	April 6, 2015	114	0.43
Principal Mitchell brings his cat, Laughy Cat, to school. Laughy Cat is an Internet video celebrity known for his ability to laugh. Mitchell catches Kirby skateboarding inside the school and, as punishment, decides to have him sketch a portrait of Laughy Cat for the cat's upcoming birthday on the following day. Mitchell departs the school to find Swedish mice for Laughy Cat's birthday party, leaving Kirby there to sketch the portrait. Afterwards, Laughy Cat escapes from Mitchell's office. Kirby, Fish, and Eli search the school for Laughy Cat and eventually retrieve him before Mitchell returns. Meanwhile, Dawn finds flowers at her school locker and brags to nearby students that she has a secret admirer. However, she learns that the flowers were actually sent by her mother, a fact that she withholds. Devon, a handsome student, offers to protect Dawn in the event that she feels uncomfortable with her secret admirer. Dawn accepts the offer and makes it appear that the fictional admirer is obsessed with her, so she can be near Devon. However, she soon becomes annoyed with his overprotective tactics and eventually admits that she made up the admirer. Guest stars: Stephen Kearin as Principal Mitchell, Hudson Thames as Devon
14	14	"The Rise and Fall of 4th Period"	Jay Karas	Joe Stillman	June 17, 2015	TBA	N/A
Mr. Bostwick, the fourth period medieval class teacher at Forest Hills High, quits after Kirby makes repeated requests for less homework. With no teacher, Kirby and the other classmates are free to do what they want in the classroom, although Eli is uncomfortable not having a teacher. After Principal Mitchell nearly discovers that Bostwick is gone, Kirby decides that the class needs a few rules to prevent Mitchell from discovering the truth. Fish disagrees and convinces the other students to act like it is medieval times in which there are no rules, plunging the classroom into chaos. When Mitchell discovers the truth, Kirby tells him that Bostwick was having his class reenact medieval times. Bostwick then resumes his role as teacher. Meanwhile, Mitchell enacts a school ban on hairdryers because they can blow fuses. Dawn and Belinda are upset by the ban because it results in frizzy hair. They decide to go on a hygiene strike until the ban is lifted, but they are unable to get other students to join them. They then follow Mitchell around, hoping that their odor will convince him to end the ban. When the girls discover that Mitchell has been hoarding school electricity for his own hairdryer, he decides to let them use his hairdryer on the condition that they not tell anyone else about him ignoring the ban. Guest stars: Stephen Kearin as Principal Mitchell, Richard Moll as Mr. Bostwick, Jack Foley as Big Ricky, Cody Sullivan as Kid Pinned to Wall
15	15	"The Hurt Box"	Eyal Gordin	Shawn Simmons	June 24, 2015	116	N/A
Each year, Principal Mitchell installs a suggestion box for students to suggest ideas to improve the school. Meanwhile, Kirby has completed a comic titled Teacher Creatures, which features exaggerated depictions of the school's teachers. Fish accidentally submits Kirby's comic, along with his own ideas, into the suggestion box. That night, Kirby, Fish and Eli infiltrate the school and sneak past Sergeant Pounder, who is moonlighting as a school security guard. The children discover that Mitchell and the teachers gather once a year for a secret school party in which they mock the students and their suggestions. The children retrieve the comic but are caught by Mitchell and the teachers, who discover the comic. Eli helps Kirby and Mitchell realize that they both have been disrespectful, and the two apologize. Meanwhile, Dawn and Belinda are hesitant to dissect a frog for a school project, so they have Gil do it for them at the S&P Mart. Before Gil dissects the frog, he accidentally spills a drink onto a lamp and a nearby hot dog cooker, causing electricity to zap the frog and bring it back to life. The frog escapes the mini-mart and is run over by a vehicle. Guest stars: Stephen Kearin as Principal Mitchell, Nathan Barnatt as Wild Gil, Gregg Binkley as Mr. Jenkins, David Figlioli as Sergeant Pounder
16	16	"Get a Grip"	Eyal Gordin	Kevin A. Garnett	July 1, 2015	117	N/A
For their school science fair project, Kirby, Fish and Eli practice the tri-five, in which they each bounce off of a trampoline and high-five each other in mid-air. Fish believes that the high-speed high-five will result in a shockwave capable of breaking glass, but instead Kirby breaks his right hand. Kirby's hand is put in a cast, and he is unable to draw until it heals in eight weeks. Kirby begins experiencing behavioral outbursts and realizes that he is acting like his animated characters. He realizes that they are taking him over as he now has no way to express his creativity. Meanwhile, Dawn believes that the universe is unfairly kind to Kirby and that it does not want her to be happy. Dawn suddenly begins experiencing various instances of good luck, and realizes that it started when Kirby broke his hand. Dawn wins a date with Ume4evr band member Chadwin, which makes her popular among other girls at school. Belinda wants to restore the universe as it was before, so she coaches Kirby to draw with his left hand. Kirby begins drawing again, and Dawn's date with Chadwin takes a downturn when she experiences food poisoning and vomits on him. With the universe restored, Kirby, Fish and Eli perform their tri-five at the science fair and each end up breaking one of their hands, including Kirby's left hand. Guest stars: Michael Naughton as Dad, Suzi Barrett as Mom, Nathan Barnatt as Wild Gil, Gregg Binkley as Mr. Jenkins, Carlos Luna as Soft Hands, Caleb Hoffman as Chadwin
17	17	"All Hands on Dexter"	Alex Winter	Ed Bedrosian	July 8, 2015	113	N/A
Gil holds a televised hands-on contest at the S&P Mart in which contestants keep their hand on a pinball machine titled Demolition Dexter, with the last remaining contestant winning the machine. Kirby, at the age of eight, met Fish six years earlier while playing the game, which Gil then put into storage. Kirby and Fish join the contest as Team Firby. Zorro, a skilled hands-on player, is also among the contestants. Zorro uses various tactics to make other contestants get out of the contest, leaving only him and Team Firby. Zorro turns Team Firby against each other by mentioning that Kirby planned to put the pinball machine in his house, and by questioning why Fish's name comes first in their team name. Kirby and Fish reconcile, and discover that Zorro's twin brother was trading places with Zorro during bathroom breaks in order to win the competition. Team Firby wins and decides to leave the pinball machine in the mini-mart. Meanwhile, Kirby and Dawn's father redeems a birthday coupon in which they must complete his chore list. Kirby has Eli fill in for him, and when Dawn learns that a television crew is filming the hands-on competition, she has Belinda fill in for her so she can attempt to sing at the contest to showcase her vocal ability. Eli and Belinda become overly competitive with their chores. Guest stars: Michael Naughton as Dad, Nathan Barnatt as Wild Gil, Samm Levine as Zorro, Samm Levine as Twin Zorro
18	18	"The AV Kid"	Walt Becker	Mike Alber & Gabe Snyder	July 15, 2015	TBA	N/A
Kirby is unable to remove an embarrassing Internet video of him losing a rap battle to his mother. Kirby learns that the school's AV club can remove the video, but the club's sole member, Chip, will not do it for two to three weeks. Chip says that he will remove the video sooner if Kirby joins the AV club, which Kirby agrees to do. Chip then removes the video immediately, but he becomes an annoying and obsessive friend to Kirby afterwards, which includes texting Kirby multiple times a day. Meanwhile, Eli learns that for the past 10 years, his grandmother has been sending him money for special occasions, including Christmas and his birthday. However, she has been sending it to the wrong address, with the money being stored at the post office until now. With $3,000, Eli and Fish decide to invest in Principal Mitchell's Fly Spy device, which automatically keeps his pants fly zipped in the event that he forgets to do it himself. Kirby becomes tired of Chip and devises a lie to end the friendship, telling Chip that he no longer has time for friends and is therefore quitting the AV club. Chip, realizing that Kirby has continued spending time with Fish and Eli, creates a plan to get rid of Kirby's two friends so he and Kirby can be friends instead. Chip sabotages Mitchell's Fly Spy presentation at the school by remotely unzipping his pants, with the hope of framing Fish and Eli. However, Kirby proves that Chip was responsible for the failed presentation. Chip apologizes to Kirby and explains that he has difficulty making friends, although he realizes how easy it is when he reveals that he is wealthy and suddenly gains multiple friends. Chip invests in the Fly Spy, and Eli's $3,000 is returned. Meanwhile, Dawn and Belinda become addicted to popping bubble wrap. Guest stars: Michael Naughton as Dad, Suzi Barrett as Mom, Stephen Kearin as Principal Mitchell, Alex Calloway as Chip, Elliott James Thomas Moore as Jean Luc
19	19	"The Mother of All Lies"	Walt Becker	Joe Stillman	July 22, 2015	TBA	0.52
Kirby avoids school tests and homework by telling his teachers various lies about his mother, but his plot is threatened when Mrs. Buckets decides to become a substitute teacher at Forest Hills Jr./Sr. High. Dawn, embarrassed by her mother, instructs Mrs. Buckets to act as if they do not know each other while they are at school. Mrs. Buckets teaches under the name of Mrs. Bu to keep her relationship with Dawn a secret. Meanwhile, the school is having a ceremony later that day to unveil a 20-year-old time capsule. Dawn is unsuccessful at obtaining a position in a dance troupe that will be performing at the ceremony. When Mrs. Buckets becomes popular among the students, Dawn wants her mother to reveal the truth in hopes of joining the troupe, but her mother continues the ruse. Meanwhile, to prevent his lies from becoming known, Kirby and his friends ensure that Mrs. Buckets has limited contact with his teachers. Later, Mrs. Buckets reveals to Kirby that she placed eggs in the time capsule 20 years earlier as revenge against Principal Mitchell, who gave her detention for a prank in which she secretly stuffed an egg into a boy's back pocket so he would sit on it. The eggs were left to rot in the capsule for the next two decades, with Mrs. Bucket's intention being to demonstrate that Mitchell stinks as a principal. Although Kirby likes her prank, he agrees to help her retrieve the capsule before it is opened, as she now considers the prank to be inappropriate. Unable to stop the capsule from being opened, they are blasted with the rotting eggs and forced by Mitchell to clean up the mess. Guest stars: Suzi Barrett as Mom, Stephen Kearin as Principal Mitchell, Olivia Chan Shipp as Skyler Absent: Tiffany Espensen as Belinda
20	20	"Send in the Clowns"	Kristofor Brown	Kristofor Brown, Mike Alber & Gabe Snyder	August 12, 2015	120	0.37
Gil wants Kirby to create a clown-themed commercial for the S&P Mini-Mart, but Kirby has had a fear of clowns ever since he and his friends were chased out of Clown Town. Fish and Eli help Kirby overcome his fear so he can create animated clowns for the advertisement. Gil, Fish and Mandy McDaniels star in the commercial, and after it is finished, they watch it air on television from the mini-mart along with Kirby and Eli. After the commercial airs, a trio of clowns visit the S&P Mini-Mart and tell Gil that they were offended by the advertisement's cheerful and stereotypical depiction of clowns. The clowns overtake the S&P Mini-Mart and demand to know who created the commercial, while Kirby sneaks out of the store and returns to his house. Kirby returns to the mini-mart and rescues everyone with help from Dawn and Belinda. Guest stars: Michael Naughton as Dad, Nathan Barnatt as Wild Gil, Keely Marshall as Mandy McDaniels, Brendan Hunt as Angry Clown, Michael "Tuba" Heatherton as Clown #2, Joe Gieb as Clown #3, Noel Batandas as Grim Reaper
21	21	"Viva la Dad"	David Kendall	Ed Bedrosian	August 19, 2015	203	0.35
Brothers Trav and Trev Babcock, students at Kirby's school, have created a series of web cartoons starring themselves. Kirby believes that Trav and Trev are untalented, and in bragging about his own artistic talent, he tells the two boys that he is starting a web show. The Babcocks challenge Kirby to a competition where they let the public decide who is more talented. If Kirby loses, then he loses the right to draw his Macho Taco character, who will become part of the Babcocks' cartoon. If the Babcocks lose, they must stop making their cartoon. Kirby helps his father prepare for his one-man show by videotaping his clumsy rehearsals, which gives Kirby much-needed inspiration for his web show. Kirby adds his animated characters into the videos and uploads them to the Internet for his web show, but his father is disappointed when he finds out about the videos, because they make fun of him. Kirby's father forgives him, and Kirby later stars in costume as his animated characters for his father's show. Kirby live streams the show on the Internet as part of his web show and is declared the winner of the competition, although Kirby is convinced to let the Babcocks keep making their cartoon. Meanwhile, Belinda has broken her leg and Dawn is embarrassed to be seen with her because of her ugly motorized cart. Belinda joins a school group known as the Cast Aways, consisting of injured students who use motorized carts and crutches, but she and Dawn eventually reconcile. Guest stars: Michael Naughton as Dad, J. Michael Trautmann as Trav, Dawson Fletcher as Trev, Zachary Mitchell as Cage

=== Season 2 (2015–16) ===
No. overall	No. in season	Title	Directed by	Written by	Original release date	Prod. code	U.S. viewers (millions)
22	1	"Failure to Launch"	Eyal Gordin	Mike Alber & Gabe Snyder	October 7, 2015	201	0.36
Kirby is preparing to launch a web channel called Kirblammo, and Dawn is jealous because she believes that their parents like Kirby more than her. While Kirby is sleeping, Dawn takes his tablet computer and sabotages the web channel ahead of its launch by uploading embarrassing home videos of him. When Kirby discovers what Dawn did, he retaliates by uploading an old home video of Dawn giving an embarrassing dance performance. Kirby and Dawn agree to end their feud, but their father accidentally uploads Dawn's video and deletes Kirby's videos. Kirby decides to retrieve copies of his videos from the Forest Hills Claude, a cloud storage service located underground. Although Dawn's video is deleted from the Internet, she accompanies Kirby so she can retrieve a copy of the video to prevent it from being spread. Upon arriving at the storage facility, Dawn and Kirby meet The Claude, a man who operates the service. The Claude dislikes technology, and uses paper and VCR tapes to store information. The Claude chases Kirby and Dawn out of the facility when he learns that they use modern technology. Kirby retrieves his videos, but Dawn is unsuccessful. Fish and Eli prepare the Kirblammo launch party at their school, and they invite Big Ricky, who is an influential web critic. Big Ricky gives Kirblammo a positive review. Meanwhile, Kirby's father and Belinda feel like they are being ignored by everyone. Guest stars: Michael Naughton as Dad, Suzi Barrett as Mom, Stephen Kearin as Principal Mitchell, Nathan Barnatt as Wild Gil, Martin Starr as The Claude, Jack Foley as Big Ricky, Ellery Davidson as Young Dawn
23	2	"The Gil in My Life"	David Kendall	Timothy Stack	October 14, 2015	204	0.30
Gil's mini-mart is closed for health violations. When Kirby discovers that Gil had also been living there and is now homeless, he allows Gil to move into the Buckets' house. However, Gil reopens the S&P Mart inside the Buckets' house, which inconveniences the family. Eventually, Kirby's father invites his boss, Mr. Sands, to the house for dinner to discuss a job opportunity for Gil. However, the meeting ends badly after Gil accidentally sets Mr. Sands' pants on fire. Kirby then devises a way for the mini-mart to reopen by getting it declared as a historic building. Meanwhile, Dawn intends to perform a song for a commercial audition being judged by Principal Mitchell as well as judges for an advertisement agency. Dawn discovers her singing voice is enhanced when she sings into one of the toilets in her house. Dawn arranges to do her audition through a video message so the judges do not realize that she is singing into a toilet. However, when the judges realize she is singing in her bathroom, they believe the situation is odd and request her to audition in person at the school. Mitchell and the other judges close their eyes as requested by Dawn when she begins performing her song on stage. However, they open their eyes during the performance and disqualify her, but they choose to have her toilet used by a professional singer after seeing how well it worked for her. Dawn is upset that her toilet has been chosen over her, and destroys it by throwing it off the stage. Guest stars: Michael Naughton as Dad, Suzi Barrett as Mom, Stephen Kearin as Principal Mitchell, Nathan Barnatt as Gil, Gregg Binkley as Mr. Jenkins, Gabriel Tigerman as Chuck, Robert Alan Beuth as Mr. Sands, Jason Boegh as Inspector Absent: Tiffany Espensen as Belinda
24	3	"The School Spirit"	Eyal Gordin	Kristofor Brown	October 21, 2015	202	0.49
As the school homecoming approaches, Kirby notices the lack of enthusiasm and school spirit among the students. Fish blames the low morale on the school's sports teams, which consistently lose. Kirby wonders why the school does not have a mascot, as he believes that having one would increase enthusiasm. However, Principal Mitchell rejects Kirby’s ideas for a mascot, saying that the school has never had one and does not need one. In the school library, Kirby, Fish and Eli discover an old yearbook from more than 100 years earlier that shows a picture of a school mascot costume. Mitchell then confiscates the yearbook and buries it in his yard. When Kirby and his friends dig it up, they also discover the torn remains of the mascot costume. Fish briefly tries on the mascot head; after taking it off, his body becomes possessed by the spirit of the mascot, who needs high levels of school spirit so he can return to his own body. At school the next day, Kirby gets the students' spirits up by convincing them that their school sports teams are the best at being the worst. The mascot spirit returns to his costume, which comes to life and terrorizes the students. Fish explains that the mascot was buried by students long ago because they believed him to be a curse on their losing sports teams. Fish also says that the mascot is now angry because he does not remember what kind of animal he is. The boys then learn that Mitchell is from a family of mascot slayers, and that he has slayed multiple mascots. After Kirby helps the mascot remember that he is a dog, Mitchell strikes the mascot with an arrow, making him inanimate again so he can be reburied. Guest stars: Stephen Kearin as Principal Mitchell, Jack Foley as Big Ricky, Nathan Barnatt as Mascot Ghost
25	4	"War and Pizza"	Linda Mendoza	Shawn Simmons	October 28, 2015	205	0.24
Kirby and Dawn's parents go out to a restaurant, and they have a list of rules for the children, which includes forbidding Kirby from inviting his friends over to the house. Kirby ignores the rule and invites Eli and Fish for a night together. They order a pizza but do not have sufficient money to tip Wayne, the pizza delivery man, who vows to get revenge on the boys. Wayne attempts to sabotage their night by breaking each of the rules set by Kirby's parents and framing him unless the boys disclose secrets they have kept from each other, which leads to arguments between them. The boys learn that Wayne is part of a brotherhood of pizza delivery men who are helping him get revenge, but the men disapprove of him after the boys get him to admit his dislike for pizza. Meanwhile, Belinda helps Dawn plot revenge against Rebecca, a student who recently took Dawn's dress in the school locker room, forcing Dawn to wear a soccer ball bag through the school the rest of the day. Dawn plans to leave a bag of foul-smelling contents on Rebecca's porch, but Rebecca sees Dawn and Belinda and invites them into her house. Rebecca apologizes for accidentally taking Dawn's dress. Dawn becomes friends with Rebecca and her family, but Rebecca's young sister Meaghan takes the bag and accidentally unleashes the contents onto her family, exposing Dawn's plot. Guest stars: Michael Naughton as Dad, Suzi Barrett as Mom, Kevin Michael Martin as Wayne, Madison Iseman as Rebecca Vanderbluff, Caroline Rich as Rebecca's Mom, Ivy George as Meaghan, Dean Sharpe as Big Pizza Guy
26	5	"The Kirbinator"	Linda Mendoza	JD Ryznar	November 4, 2015	206	0.36
Guest stars: Stephen Kearin as Principal Mitchell, Corin Nemec as Future Kirby, Elliot Moore as Jean Luc
27	6	"Balloonacy!"	David Kendall	Farhan Arshad	November 18, 2015	208	0.32
Absent: Tiffany Espensen as Belinda
28	7	"Kirby Sells Out"	Eyal Gordin	Kyle Mack	November 25, 2015	209	0.32
29	8	"It's a Kirbyful Life!"	David Kendall	Marissa Berlin	November 30, 2015	207	0.31
Shortly before Christmas, Kirby becomes overwhelmed by numerous requests to use his artistic talent for various things, such as Christmas cards for his relatives, and an elf cutout for Principal Mitchell. Kirby wishes that he had never learned how to draw, and then wakes up the next morning to find that his wish has come true. He is now a skilled French horn player, and Dawn now thinks of the two of them as best friends. Fish and Eli try to help Kirby undo his wish through various methods, but none are successful. Gil then tells Kirby that he has to have fun drawing again to undo the wish. After missing his horn performance at a school holiday concert, Kirby's parents become convinced that he is troubled and decide to send him to a school for troubled boys that is run by Mitchell. Kirby evades Mitchell and remembers that he became interested in drawing nine years earlier during a Christmas in which Dawn became enraged because one of his presents was bigger than hers; her anger inspired him to draw her as a monster. To become inspired, Kirby, Fish and Eli try to anger Dawn by disrupting her Christmas present charity event at school, but they are unsuccessful. However, Dawn becomes enraged when Mitchell tries to take Kirby away, giving Kirby inspiration to draw her as a monster, thereby undoing the wish. Guest stars: Michael Naughton as Dad, Suzi Barrett as Mom, Stephen Kearin as Principal Mitchell, Nathan Barnatt as Wild Gil, Gregg Binkley as Mr. Jenkins
30	9	"Atta Boy"	Jay Karas	Ed Bedrosian	December 2, 2015	212	0.37
Kirby's father turns into a monster on game days and asks Kirby to make sure that nothing happens to his special pants. However, while working on improving his throw, Kirby spills water on the pants and then tries to dry them, but essentially removes the while hand print left on the backside as an autograph, which is what made them special, while doing so. Meanwhile, Dawn and Belinda babysit a baby; however, Dawn accidentally glues eyebrows and an axe on the baby with industrial strength glue. When the baby's father comes back, he doesn't suspect a thing because the police are on the search for a criminal who was last seen with big brows and an axe. Later, Kirby, Fish, and Eli steal Trace's hand replica in order to attempt to re-apply the hand print, but it goes wrong when Kirby's father discovers what's going on. However, he's later proud of Kirby for going through all that just for him.
31	10	"I, Gregory"	Eyal Gordin	Mike Alber & Gabe Snyder	January 27, 2016	210	0.27
32	11	"Weekend with Inga"	Jay Karas	Shawn Simmons	February 10, 2016	211	N/A
Absent: Tiffany Espensen as Belinda
33	12	"Ripper Impossible"	Eyal Gordin	Ben Glass & Ross Zimmerman	February 17, 2016	214	0.32
34	13	"Kirby to the Max"	David Kendall	Timothy Stack	February 24, 2016	215	0.30
At school, Pearly Todd takes Kirby's skateboard, but falls off of it and hits his head. The school children mistakenly believe that Kirby knocked Todd out, and they hail him as a hero. Kirby accepts the credit. Todd does not remember what happened, and is now scared of Kirby. At the request of Todd's parents, Principal Mitchell holds a hearing at the school to determine what happened. Kirby claims that he beat up Todd to spare the other children of his bullying ways. Mitchell sentences Kirby to detention on Saturdays. On Saturday, the school is transformed into a maximum detention center, for which Mitchell has hired a private firm to operate, as he is too afraid of the children who attend the detention program. During detention, Kirby meets The Colonel, who runs the detention program. During detention, The Colonel operates a secret tickle pit inside the school in which he charges business people to watch as children face off in a ring: the first one to laugh from being tickled is the loser. The Colonel is fired and his business operation is ended when Principal Mitchell comes to the school to take free school supplies. Meanwhile, Dawn is upset that an unflattering online picture of her is now being used for Morning Breeze yogurt, which helps diarrhea and nausea. Mandy nicknames her "Dawnarrhea." Dawn and Belinda attempt to rid the town of all Morning Breeze yogurt. Guest stars: Stephen Kearin as Principal Mitchell, Nathan Barnatt as Gil, Jack Foley as Big Ricky, Blake Clark as The Colonel, Shak Ghacha as Shivers, Austin Fryberger as Pearly Todd, Keely Marshall as Mandy
35	14	"Oh Bros, Where Are Thou?"	David Kendall	Marissa Berlin	March 2, 2016	216	0.32
For "Bro-morial Day", Kirby, Fish and Eli pull a prank in the school cafeteria in which they pretend that Kirby's pet rabbit, Dog, has accidentally been cooked in a pot of chili and served to the school children. Principal Mitchell cannot prove that Kirby pulled the prank, but he knows that Fish and Eli were involved and requests that their mothers meet with him. Kirby hires actresses to fill in as their mothers so their real mothers will not find out about the prank, but Mitchell realizes that the women are actresses. Fish and Eli's real mothers are informed of the prank and are also requested to attend Mitchell's book club. The mothers forbid their sons from spending time with Kirby, and attach ankle monitors to the boys to prevent them from getting near each other. Fish develops an interest for science while Eli starts working out. When Fish and Eli realize how dull their life is without Kirby, they decide to throw balloons full of sour cream at zoo animals. They later dig through a trash dumpster and get tossed into a garbage truck. When they do not return, Kirby is informed by their mothers about their disappearance and tracks them down. Kirby rescues Fish and Eli, whose mothers allow the boys to hang out again on the condition that Kirby has the actresses fill in for them during Mitchell's book club. Meanwhile, Dawn, who has a dislike of dentists and waiting in dental offices, has signed up for a "surprise dentist," who will randomly arrive to pull her tooth out when she least expects it. Belinda realizes that Dawn's dentist is Dan the Bounty Hunter Dentist, who resembles a biker and wears a necklace made up of teeth. Belinda, a former client of Dan's, convinces Dawn that she should be fearful of Dan. Dawn later realizes that the tooth removal is simple and that Dan is actually a nice person. Guest stars: Stephen Kearin as Principal Mitchell, Abraham Benrubi as Dan The Dentist, Jenica Bergere as Eli's mom, Debra Wilson as Fish's mom, Abby Wathen as Eli's fake mom, Lauren McCarroll as Fish's fake mom
36	15	"Twinsies"	Eyal Gordin	Kyle Mack	March 9, 2016	217	0.37
A hurricane is expected to hit Forest Beach High School. As a result, "beach kids" are temporarily transferred to Kirby's school. Kirby meets a look-alike boy named Bucky who also has a web channel, although his videos are live-action and are meant to inspire serious thought, unlike Kirby's cartoons. Kirby and Bucky become enemies and pull pranks on each other. Dawn meets a new student named Dawn Biscuits, who is Bucky's sister. Everyone confuses the two Dawns because of their similar appearances. The Dawns team up to prank their brothers by luring them into a room, where they are then locked in. Kirby and Bucky team up to escape through the sewer. Kirby and Bucky discover that their friends, Eli and his look-alike Levi, know each other from an incident a few years ago in which their mothers accidentally left them in a taffy store at a mall. Meanwhile, Fish and Bucky's friend, Bird, have fallen in love with each other, although neither of them will admit their feelings for one another. The beach kids return to their own school after the hurricane passes. Guest stars: Stephen Kearin as Principal Mitchell, Jack Foley as Big Ricky, Cooper Roth as Bucky, Thomas Barbusca as Levi, Genneya Walton as Bird, Lottie Shudde as Dawn Biscuits Absent: Tiffany Espensen as Belinda
37	16	"Say Uncle"	Eyal Gordin	JD Ryznar	March 16, 2016	213	0.39
Kirby is caught by his mother attempting to watch a film at a movie theater with Fish and Eli. Kirby's mother is upset that he tried to watch the film before she could make sure it was age-appropriate. As punishment, Kirby must untangle "The Ball," a mass of junk that has accumulated in the family's basement. In The Ball, Kirby discovers an old birthday card addressed to him from his Uncle Leon, who he did not realize existed. Kirby's mother explains that her brother Leon's "solids" are like favors that he does for people, but they wind up backfiring. She explains that when they were children, she wanted a dog, so Leon brought home a wolf that ate one of her butt cheeks, forcing her to get a fake butt cheek. She forbids Kirby from contacting Leon. Kirby contacts Leon, who does several solids for Kirby, including a crab lunch at school, and increasing his website subscriber count to 20,000. Kirby tells Leon that he wants to be as cool as him. However, Leon's solids later turn out not to be as good as they initially seem, as Kirby vomits from the crab lunch and his website is shut down after it is discovered that someone had tampered with it to increase the subscriber count. Leon then arrives at Kirby's school with a car stolen from the Brads, who then become angry with Kirby and Leon. Kirby's mother later reveals that she set all this up as revenge against Kirby for seeing the film without her permission, saying that Leon owed her a solid after the butt cheek incident. Meanwhile, Dawn saves Principal Mitchell from choking on a turkey leg. Mitchell mistakenly believes that a nearby stray dog was the one who saved him. Mitchell declares the dog a hero. Big Ricky has video footage which proves that Dawn is the one who saved Mitchell. Dawn agrees to be Big Ricky's girlfriend in exchange for the video. When Dawn reveals that she is the true hero, everyone boos her, as they would rather have a dog as the hero. Guest stars: Stephen Kearin as Principal Mitchell, Suzi Barrett, Nathan Barnatt as Gil, Jack Foley as Big Ricky, Zach LaVine as himself, Adam Hagenbuch as Brad, Zach Selwyn as Uncle Leon Absent: Tiffany Espensen as Belinda
38	17	"When Mitchell Met Dad"	Eyal Gordin	Mike Alber & Gabe Snyder	March 23, 2016	218	0.26
39	18	"Mitchell's Gauntlet"	Savage Steve Holland	Mike Alber & Gabe Snyder	March 30, 2016	220	0.32
Absent: Tiffany Espensen as Belinda
40	19	"Call of Doodie"	Joe Menendez	Joe Stillman	June 20, 2016	221	0.30
41	20	"Tunnel Babies"	Joe Menendez	JD Ryznar	June 27, 2016	222	N/A
Dawn and Kirby discover from news host Dallas Cleveland that they were the center of an old news story when they were toddlers, in which their parents lost them and they wandered into the city's tunnels, becoming known as the "Tunnel Babies." Dawn and Kirby learn that it was Dawn who rescued Kirby from the tunnels and was labeled as a hero. Kirby subsequently feels the reluctant urge to behave friendly toward Dawn for saving his life. Dawn and Kirby appear on Cleveland's news program. Kirby has a plan to rescue Dawn from a falling sandbag during the program, so he can be her hero and end his friendly feelings for her. However, Kirby's idea does not go as planned and he unintentionally pushes Dawn under the falling sandbag. While Dawn is unconscious in a hospital, Kirby discovers that her condition improves each time he insults her. Their mother then reveals to Dawn that she never rescued Kirby, but actually brought him into the tunnels because of her dislike for him. Dawn regains consciousness upon hearing the truth. Meanwhile, Fish and Eli begin selling wigs at school, but must do so covertly because of Principal Mitchell's ban on disguises.
42	21	"Buckets of Money"	David Kendall	Bijan Shams-Pirzadeh	July 11, 2016	224	0.34
Kirby wants to save up his money for a new video game console. When Chip Willis complains about how difficult it is to live a rich lifestyle, Kirby makes a cartoon that mocks Chip, who then decides to give Kirby all his money so he can see what it is like to live rich. A trio of men, dressed in business suits and known as the Suits, appear and begin offering Kirby financial advice. Kirby develops an obsession with protecting his money and making more. Kirby purchases his own battleship, the USS Kirblamo, where he stores his money. The Suits convince Kirby that Fish and Eli want the money for themselves. Fish and Eli reach Kirby aboard the ship and try to help him end his obsession. Kirby realizes that the Suits are not real and that he has actually been getting his financial advice from a tax accounting video game. The money is shot out of a battleship cannon. Meanwhile, Dawn has received a free sub sandwich after months of flirting with the restaurant's manager. However, a person sneezes on her sandwich, leading her to wonder why situations never work out for her. The next day, Dawn arrives at school as a guru and begins preaching "Dawn-lightenment". Dawn gains many followers, including Principal Mitchell, although she abandons them when the money from Kirby's battleship falls upon her outside the school.
43	22	"Torched"	David Kendall	Ed Bedrosian	July 25, 2016	223	0.35
44	23	"Me Time: The Ballad of Mac and Mom"	Savage Steve Holland	Shawn Simmons	August 15, 2016	219	N/A
Mac McCallister visits Kirby's house. Kirby discovers that his mother and Mac have a substantial dislike for each other, as they were in a high school band that broke up after a disagreement. A CD player is left by an unknown individual at the doorstep of the Buckets' house, and Kirby learns that it has the ability to transport him to the high school during the band's final performance in 1994. Attempting to keep the band from breaking up, Kirby relives the experience several times and ultimately succeeds. Meanwhile, Dawn begins taking fashion advice from a talking parrot, after deeming Belinda a poor fashion adviser. Guest stars: Michael Naughton as Dad, Suzi Barrett as Mom, Stephen Kearin as Principal Mitchell, Michael Daniel Cassady as Mac McCallister
45	24	"Battle of the Ballot"	Kristofor Brown	Kristofor Brown	August 22, 2016	225	N/A
Kirby is caught having a party in Principal Mitchell's office. As punishment, Kirby must eat lunch with Mitchell for the next 100 school days. Kirby convinces Eli to run for class president, so Eli can pardon Kirby from his punishment. Dawn, who does not like listening to Kirby chew food with his mouth open in the school cafeteria, plots to keep Kirby's punishment ongoing. Dawn convinces a student named Sad Randy to run for class president, using his sad life history to persuade other students to vote for him. Eli decides he cannot run against Sad Randy, for whom he feels sorry. Kirby then convinces Fish to run for president, despite his initial reluctance, as he claims to become overly obsessive with school politics. Despite falling down a well, Sad Randy participates in the school debate via cell phone video. Eli appears at the school debate to announce that he has been meeting with an elderly woman who enjoys pinching his cheeks, in exchange for money to pay for expensive campaign supplies. Eli officially withdraws from the school election. With Belinda's help, Kirby discovers that Sad Randy is actually in Dawn's closet, and that the well story was fabricated by Dawn to help him win the election. Fish wins the election and pardons Kirby. As punishment, Dawn must now eat 100 lunches with Mitchell.
46	25	"The Goods"	Kristofor Brown	Mike Alber & Gabe Snyder	August 29, 2016	226	0.18
Big Bald Oaf has ended, and series creator Mac McCallister is now seeking ideas for a new series. Kirby plans to attend an audition where he can present his idea. However, Kirby is unable to devise a good idea and realizes that he has lost his creative talent, which he refers to as "The Goods". Eli turns into an arrogant fashion model after repeatedly hearing the phrase, "The Goods". Eli explains to Kirby and Fish that he was a top fashion model when he was younger, until jealous models hypnotized him with their model poses to make him believe that he was a nice and modest person. Kirby then agrees to be hypnotized by Eli's model poses. Kirby is sent into a deep sleep, where he enters his subconscious mind to search for a good idea. Kirby awakens and realizes that his life and family and friends make up the perfect idea for a television series. Mac McCallister agrees with Kirby's idea. Meanwhile, Dawn believes that her vision board can predict her future, but Belinda disagrees, saying that her psychic, Philip, is the best at predicting future events. The girls disagree and make a bet: the loser must attend Big Ricky's "Masque-rage" ball. Big Ricky then tells the girls that the dreams of his friend, Douglas, are the best at predicting the future. Big Ricky bets the girls that if they are wrong, they both must attend his ball. All of Douglas' dreams come true, and the girls are forced to attend Big Ricky's ball. Guest stars: Michael Naughton as Dad, Suzi Barnett as Mom, Stephen Kearin as Principal Mitchell, Jack Foley as Big Ricky, Michael Daniel Cassady as Mac McCallister

=== Season 3: Warped (2017) ===
No. overall	No. in season	Title	Directed by	Written by	Original release date	Prod. code	U.S. viewers (millions)
47	1	"Yep, This Is Happening"	Kristofor Brown	Mike Alber & Gabe Snyder	January 16, 2017	301	0.14
Kirby has been sued by Dawn for drawing cartoons that mock her, and is legally no longer allowed to draw his characters. Principal Mitchell, who is upset at Kirby for promising him a role in a television show that failed to materialize, has Kirby clean up his office as punishment. While cleaning Mitchell's office, Kirby discovers a secret orb and takes it home with him. While arguing with Kirby, Dawn throws the orb and inadvertently opens up a portal to another dimension of reality. The children's parents enter through the portal. Mitchell arrives to retrieve his orb and uses it to close the portal, before being informed by the children that their parents had entered it. Kirby and Dawn travel through a portal to search for their parents, despite Mitchell's insistence that they not do so. Mitchell sets up a device to destroy the portal in two hours, whether or not Kirby and Dawn have returned. Meanwhile, Belinda invites children to the Buckets' house to throw a party for Kirby. Mitchell DJs the party to keep it from becoming too exciting, which would interfere with his device. In the alternate dimension, Kirby and Dawn rescue their parents from a wasteland that is run by clowns and a group of people known as Mad Brads. Upon their return, Kirby and Dawn discover that they actually rescued two barbaric individuals named Brad who are only identical to their parents. Guest stars: Michael Naughton as Dad, Suzi Barrett as Mom, Stephen Kearin as Principal Mitchell, Nathan Barnatt as Clown Gil, Adam Hagenbuch as Main Mad Brad, Barrett James as Cool Janitor
48	2	"Bad Seed"	Mathew Rudenberg	Kristofor Brown	January 17, 2017	302	0.13
After Principal Mitchell explains the rules of inter-dimensional travel, Kirby goes through a portal in search of his real parents. Kirby brings Eli and Fish with him, despite Principal Mitchell's warning not to do so. In the alternate dimension, Kirby's school is a clean and organized facility in which all of its students wear uniforms and behave appropriately. Kirby, Fish and Eli take the place of their alternate selves. Fish is upset to discover that in this dimension, his alternate self is highly athletic unlike himself. Also in this dimension, Eli is considered a bad student by the school's principal, Mr. Jenkins. In the alternate dimension, Kirby works at the school as a botanist for Jenkins. In the laboratory, Kirby discovers that his alternate self, along with Jenkins, have a process to treat misbehaving children by turning them into seeds and re-growing them with improved obedience. Jenkins attempts to re-grow Kirby after feeling that he has spent too much time with Eli. Fish discovers his athletic abilities and uses them to fight off Jenkins' henchmen, allowing the three children to escape. Meanwhile, Dawn stays at the house with Belinda, to watch over the Brad parents, who harass her for her candy snacks, ultimately resorting to kidnapping Belinda to get them. Guest stars: Michael Naughton as Dad, Suzi Barrett as Mom, Stephen Kearin as Principal Mitchell, Gregg Binkley as Mr. Jenkins, Austin Fryberger as Pearly Todd
49	3	"Queen for a Dawn"	Trish Sie	Timothy Stack	January 18, 2017	303	0.13
To search for their parents, Kirby and Dawn use Mitchell's orb to set up a portal in their school's janitorial closet. Kirby and Dawn go through the portal and enter a medieval world where Dawn is the queen. Dawn chooses to forget the search for her parents so she can rule over her kingdom and receive special treatment. Kirby later helps rescue Dawn after discovering that she is to be sacrificed to a giant spider. He recruits the help of Apollo, a peasant known for his attractive calves, and Sad Randy, a miserable boy who prefers being locked in a dungeon to his normal life. Meanwhile, Fish and Eli attempt to stop Big Ricky from revealing the existence of the portal. Belinda accidentally goes through the portal and becomes trapped in a dungeon. Guest stars: Michael Naughton as Dad, Suzi Barrett as Mom, Jack Foley as Big Ricky, David Figlioli as Sergeant Pounder, Carsen Warner as Sad Randy, Davi Santos as Apollo
50	4	"Forest Hills Blues"	Trish Sie	Romanski	January 19, 2017	304	0.16
As Kirby continues the search for his parents, Principal Mitchell warns him that there is a Mitchell portal guardian in each dimension who will capture him if possible. Kirby enters an alternate dimension where he is a police officer. His partner is Officer Mitchell, an alternate version of Principal Mitchell. In the alternate dimension, Fish is Kirby's boss, while Eli and Jean-Luc are criminals who want to meet with Kirby. Eli and Jean-Luc capture Mitchell. When Kirby finds Eli and Jean-Luc, he is informed by them that they all three used to be horses together until a witch granted them a wish Kirby made to become humans. Eli and Jean-Luc have a potion that will turn them all back into horses, but it will only work if they all drink it. Eli and Jean-Luc are arrested, and Officer Mitchell reveals to Kirby that he is aware of the search for his parents. Mitchell allows Kirby to go free, and gives him the coordinates to the dimension in which his parents are located. Meanwhile, the Brad parents make a deal with Dawn to get her a dog. Instead, they give her Big Ricky, who they have brainwashed into behaving like a dog. Guest stars: Michael Naughton as Dad, Suzi Barrett as Mom, Stephen Kearin as Principal Mitchell, Nathan Barnatt as Gil, Jack Foley as Big Ricky, Elliott Moore as Jean-Luc, David Mattey as Big Dude Absent: Tiffany Espensen as Belinda
51	5	"Cool Chad"	Jay Karas	Mike Alber & Gabe Snyder	January 20, 2017	305	0.13
The Brad parents are returned to their own world. Dawn and Kirby then enter the dimension where their real parents are located: a world where their school is run by a computer program named Cool Chäd, who only allows young people to roam the school and hands out free taquitos to students who report adult sightings. Dawn and Kirby locate their parents, but they are all captured and sent inside a Mario-like computer program. Kirby manages to disrupt Cool Chäd's program, and everyone is set free. Meanwhile, Fish and Eli are put in charge of cleaning Kirby's house ahead of his parents' arrival. However, Fish and Eli use the opportunity to do things in Kirby's house that they could not normally do, resulting in more messes. Eventually, they are forced to open the house to a party in order to pay for cleaning services, but when one of the guests flushes the money down the kitchen sink, the two decide to throw the trash into the portal. Guest stars: Michael Naughton as Dad, Suzi Barrett as Mom, Jack Foley as Big Ricky, DC Pierson as Mr. Krause, Christian Gehring as Cool Chäd, Megan Truong as Paula, Hunter Buch as Kid Statue Absent: Tiffany Espensen as Belinda
52	6	"The Unpranked"	Jay Karas	Ed Bedrosian	January 23, 2017	306	N/A
For Prank Williams Jr. Day, Kirby steals Principal Mitchell's orb and convinces Fish and Eli to accompany him on trips to alternate dimensions to pull pranks on alternate versions of himself. The three arrive in a dimension where their school is run by Principal Prank Williams Jr., who drains energy from each child that he pranks so he can stay young. The children believe that Kirby is "The Chosen One" who can stop Prank Williams Jr. Kirby succeeds by pranking Prank Williams Jr., restoring youthfulness to all the children he had pranked. Meanwhile, in Kirby's original dimension, Mitchell hires Dawn to prank children at the school, as he is unable to do so because of his job as principal. In exchange, Mitchell promises to send Kirby to an alternate dimension occupied by bees that will sting him. Mitchell later reveals to Dawn that she has been pranked by him, informing her that there is no bee dimension and that she was tricked into acting as his "prank assassin". Dawn gets revenge on Mitchell by unleashing bees on him. Guest stars: Stephen Kearin as Principal Mitchell, Jack Foley as Big Ricky, Tim Johnson Jr as Briefcase, Burt Grinstead as Prank Williams Jr. Absent: Tiffany Espensen as Belinda
53	7	"Commander Kirbo"	David Kendall	Kyle Mack	January 24, 2017	307	0.08
Kirby, Eli and Fish are enjoying their day and are glad to be free of inter-dimensional travel. In an alternate universe in outer space, Commander Kirbo, along with Lieutenant Eli and medical doctor Fish, retrieve a piece of an orb that exists in their universe. Commander Kirbo and his friends then respond to a distress call by his ex-girlfriend, Man-D, whose spaceship is being terrorized by a person who has been infected with an alien virus. After arriving, Kirbo sends Dawn-Slug, a slug alien, to retrieve space pizza for the group. Kirbo and his friends take down the infected person, the universe's counterpart of Big Ricky, and discover a robotic space leech attached to his neck, which they realize is being operated from the spaceship's control room. Kirbo and his friends discover that Man-D was controlling the space leech, and that she is working with the evil Lord Mitchell. Dawn-Slug returns with the space pizza, and her slime trail causes Lord Mitchell to fall, saving Kirbo and his friends. However, Lord Mitchell manages to obtain Kirbo's piece of the orb and uses it to escape with Man-D to another dimension. Guest stars: Stephen Kearin as Principal Mitchell, Nathan Barnatt as Gil, Jack Foley as Big Ricky, Keely Marshall as Mandy Absent: Tiffany Espensen as Belinda
54	8	"Dr. Mac 'n' Cheese's Labyrinth of Horrors"	David Kendall	Erin Wagoner	January 25, 2017	308	0.15
It is Kirby's turn to decide on a family vacation, and he struggles to devise one that will satisfy his parents, who are still upset with Dawn for her chosen vacation, during which it rained the entire time. Kirby convinces his reluctant parents to go on an inter-dimensional vacation using Principal Mitchell's orb. A blindfolded Dawn, although initially refusing to go on the vacation, trips over the family luggage and falls into the portal with the rest of her family. The family is transported to a maze of concrete hallways that is overseen by a talking guinea pig named Dr. Mac 'n' Cheese, who is an evil scientist. Dr. Mac 'n' Cheese captures Kirby and switches bodies with him so he can finally reach a jar of applesauce on a high shelf. Meanwhile, in Forest Hills, Fish is upset because today is the five-year anniversary of the death of his pet guinea pig, Mr. Mac 'n' Cheese. Gil remarks that Mr. Mac 'n' Cheese sounds a lot like his own pet guinea pig, Señor Mac 'n' Cheese, who disappeared five years ago today. Fish and Gil argue over who was the real owner of Mac 'n' Cheese. Principal Mitchell overhears the argument and says that this animal sounds like his guinea pig, Mademoiselle Mac et Fromage, who was stolen from him five years ago. Using his magical powers, Mitchell performs a séance with Gil, Fish and Eli to contact the guinea pig's spirit and determine its true owner. Kirby – still in the body of Dr. Mac 'n' Cheese – is briefly transported to the séance, where he informs the group of his identity. Mitchell realizes that they contacted the wrong guinea pig, and says that the séance can only be conducted once every 100 years, concluding that they may never know who the guinea pig's true owner was. Kirby switches bodies with Dr. Mac 'n' Cheese, and he and his family return home, where his parents conclude that his vacation was still better than Dawn's. Guest stars: Michael Naughton as Dad, Suzi Barrett as Mom, Stephen Kearin as Principal Mitchell, Nathan Barnatt as Gil, Barrett James as Cool Janitor Absent: Tiffany Espensen as Belinda
55	9	"Closing Time"	Troy Rowland	Bijan Shams-Pirzadeh	January 26, 2017	309	0.11
Kirby has developed an obsession with Principal Mitchell's orb. Mitchell warns Kirby that over-using the orb can cause an inter-dimensional collapse. Kirby disobeys Mitchell's warning and steals the orb, which results in numerous rifts—tears in the fabric between universes—appearing all over Forest Hills. Mitchell attempts to close all the rifts with the power of the orb, although he cannot keep up with them as they keep appearing. Meanwhile, Dawn is upset about Mandy's specially themed upcoming "Dawn's Gonna Show Up With Big Ricky" dance, which results in Big Ricky pestering her to go to the dance with him. A boy with squid tentacles appears out of one of the rifts. Dawn promises to get the boy back home, as long as he first accompanies her to the dance. Dawn attaches fake hands to the boy to conceal his tentacles. Kirby steals back the orb from Mitchell, who then takes him to a dimension consisting of a wrestling ring. In the ring, Mitchell has Kirby wrestle his obsession, which has taken the appearance of a man with a giant version of Mitchell's orb for a head. Kirby overcomes his obsession. At the dance, Big Ricky exposes the boy's tentacles, causing everyone to flee. Belinda appears at the dance, after escaping the dungeon. Mitchell detonates the orb in order to seal up all the rifts at once. Guest stars: Stephen Kearin as Principal Mitchell, Nathan Barnatt as Gil, Jack Foley as Big Ricky, Keely Marshall as Mandy, Michael Ensign as The Superintendent, Chase Austin as Sebastian
56	10	"A Tale of Two Kirbys"	Skot Bright	Mike Alber & Gabe Snyder	January 30, 2017	310	0.15
During a fight, Lord Mitchell and Commander Kirbo go through a portal leading to Kirby's dimension, where they take control of their alternate selves. Kirbo eventually convinces Fish and Eli that he is not the Kirby they know but is actually from another dimension. Lord Mitchell enlists Trav and Trev to aide him in his quest to destroy Kirby's universe. Lord Mitchell finds Kirbo, Fish and Eli at the S&P Mart. After winning a fight, Lord Mitchell changes Kirbo into Kirby. Principal Mitchell then briefly regains control of his body long enough to inform Kirby and his friends of a serum that can permanently dispel Lord Mitchell. Kirby locates the serum. Meanwhile, Dawn is upset that she had to spend time with an annoying girl while Belinda was trapped in another dimension. However, Dawn says she forgives Belinda, who feels upset by Dawn's comments and believes that she deserves an apology from her. Belinda decides to end her friendship with Dawn, who then becomes convinced that this is a different Belinda from another universe who wants to destroy the world. Kirby, Fish, Eli and Belinda face off against Lord Mitchell in the school. As Kirby is about to use the serum on Lord Mitchell, Dawn intervenes and uses it instead on Belinda, with no effect. Lord Mitchell sends the five children through a portal to another dimension. Guest stars: Michael Naughton as Dad, Suzi Barrett as Mom, Stephen Kearin as Principal Mitchell, Jack Foley as Big Ricky, J. Michael Trautmann as Trav, Dawson Fletcher as Trev
57	11	"That Sinking Feeling"	Savage Steve Holland	Ben Glass & Ross Zimmerman	January 31, 2017	311	0.19
Kirby, Fish, Eli, Dawn and Belinda are banished to a desert wasteland in another dimension. After a week, everyone starts blaming Dawn for their current situation. Dawn chooses to leave the group. After a day, the children decide to search for Dawn. They discover this dimension's version of the S&P Mart, buried underground and fully stocked with food. They also discover that the mart is inhabited by an alternate version of Mitchell, who informs Kirby that his sister may be at the local high school. While Kirby goes to the school, the other children play a board game with Mitchell for a chance to use his orb and return to their own dimension. At the school, Kirby encounters children who had been performing in a school play when the area was contaminated by toxic volcano gas, which results in savage behavior of anyone who inhales it. The children force Kirby to face off against Dawn in an audition for a play, with the loser being thrown down into lava below the stage. Dawn, who has been infected by the volcano gas, now refers to herself as Dusk. She kicks Kirby off the stage and is declared the winner of the audition. The theatrical children bring their director to meet Dawn. The director is not a real person and is made up of inanimate objects, including an orb, which Mitchell did not actually have. Dawn steals the orb and rescues Kirby, who managed to land safely on a rock in the lava. Dawn explains to Kirby that she only pretended to be part of the theatrical group so she could obtain the orb. The children return to their own dimension. Guest stars: Stephen Kearin as Principal Mitchell, Nathan Barnatt as Gil, Alexandra Doke as Janis
58	12	"Orbed and Dangerous"	Savage Steve Holland	Kristofor Brown	February 1, 2017	312	0.18
Kirby, Fish, Eli, Dawn and Belinda return to their dimension and discover that Lord Mitchell is planning a pancake charity dinner at the school, using special pancakes that will turn everyone into his minions. The children are unsuccessful in stopping Lord Mitchell, who sends his new minions to alternate dimensions to retrieve orbs that he can use to become stronger. Lord Mitchell's ultimate goal is to become a god that can dunk basketballs, to overcome childhood memories of his father always beating him at basketball. Fish, Eli and Belinda go undercover as minions to gain information on Lord Mitchell, but they discover that Eli could not resist the pancakes and is now a real minion. Kirby and Dawn go to alternate dimensions to build up a small army, which includes Dr. Mac 'n' Cheese, the Brad Dad, and a clown. However, Eli feeds the army with pancakes, turning them into minions. Dawn distracts the army to allow Kirby to escape. At the S&P Mart, Fish and Belinda inform Kirby of the coordinates to an alternate dimension to which Mitchell refused to send any minions and which he declined to speak about. Lord Mitchell arrives at the S&P Mart, but is unsuccessful in preventing Kirby from escaping to the dimension. Kirby meets Mitchell Prime, who plans to train him to become a gatekeeper. Special guest star: John Wall as himself Guest stars: Michael Naughton as Dad, Stephen Kearin as Principal Mitchell, J. Michael Trautmann as Trav, Dawson Fletcher as Trev, David Figlioli as Sergeant Pounder, Carsen Warner as Sad Randy
59	13	"Yep, Still Happening"	Kristofor Brown	Mike Alber & Gabe Snyder	February 2, 2017	313	0.16
Kirby is trained by Mitchell Prime to become a gatekeeper over the course of 15 years, although time works differently in this dimension, which will allow Kirby to return to his own dimension with very little time passed. Kirby is disappointed that much of his gatekeeper training consists of cutting onions and learning from flashcards. During his 15 years in this dimension, Kirby gains a son named Kirby Jr. Lord Mitchell enters the dimension and takes down Mitchell Prime, then brings Kirby back with him to the high school. Lord Mitchell forces Kirby to use his artistic talent to draw pictures that mock other people, including his own parents. Meanwhile, Dawn is convinced that this will be her last day on Earth before Lord Mitchell destroys the universe, so she reluctantly decides to spend it with Big Ricky, who is upset that all his friends have been turned into minions. Kirby texts a drawing to Dawn that mocks her, leading her and Big Ricky to come to the school for revenge. Kirby has Lord Mitchell pose for his own drawing in front of a door. Dawn and Big Ricky enter the school and knock over Lord Mitchell, allowing Kirby to take control of Mitchell's magical staff. Kirby banishes Lord Mitchell. Principal Mitchell and the minions regain control of their bodies. Mitchell Prime reveals that he has fully recovered from Lord Mitchell's attack, and he informs Kirby that he has raised Kirby Jr. into adulthood. Principal Mitchell informs Mitchell Prime that he is retiring as a principal and as a gatekeeper so he can pursue an acting career in Hollywood. Later, Dawn and Big Ricky become a couple, and Kirby says goodbye to Eli and Fish before boarding a school bus with his animated characters. The school bus is driven by an alternate version of Mitchell, who takes Kirby through a portal to another dimension. Guest stars: Michael Naughton as Dad, Suzi Barrett as Mom, Stephen Kearin as Principal Mitchell, Nathan Barnatt as Gil, Jack Foley as Big Ricky, J. Michael Trautmann as Trav, Dawson Fletcher as Trev, Barbara Fitchett as Lunch Lady Helen
