= KCFG =

Television station in Flagstaff, Arizona (2000–2011)

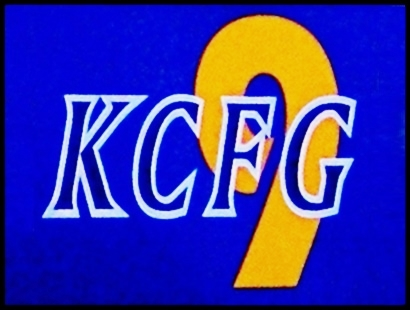
- Flagstaff, Arizona; United States
- Channels: Digital: 32 (UHF); Virtual: 9

Programming
- Affiliations: America One

Ownership
- Owner: KM Communications; (KM Television of Flagstaff, LLC)

History
- First air date: December 20, 2000
- Last air date: September 6, 2011; (10 years, 260 days)
- Former channel numbers: Analog: 9 (VHF, 2000–2009)

Technical information
- Licensing authority: FCC
- Facility ID: 35104
- ERP: 1,000 kW
- HAAT: 343 m (1,125 ft)
- Transmitter coordinates: 34°58′6″N 111°30′32″W

Links
- Public license information: Public file; LMS

KCFG (channel 9) was a television station in Flagstaff, Arizona, United States, owned by KM Communications. The station's transmitter was located atop Mormon Mountain, about 20 miles (32 km) south of Flagstaff in the Coconino National Forest.

== History ==
KCFG began with an original construction permit granted to KM Communications on February 10, 1997, to transmit from Mount Elden north of Flagstaff. Although KCFG was to be a full-service station, environmental restrictions at the transmitter site limited it to 1 kW ERP. The station went on-air December 20, 2000, and was licensed July 18, 2001. Immediately, KCFG applied to move their transmitter site to Mormon Mountain south of Flagstaff, intending to build both full 316 kW analog and 1,000 kW digital facilities there. However, the construction permit was not granted until nearly two years later and the analog facilities went unbuilt.

KCFG had originally elected to remain on channel 32 after the DTV transition in February 2009, but has since applied to the Federal Communications Commission (FCC) to move to VHF digital channel 9.

On November 6, 2012, the license assigned to KCFG was canceled and the call letters were deleted, due to the station's signal being silent since September 6, 2011.

=== FCC rule violations ===
The FCC proposed a $10,000 fine against KCFG in March 2006 because the station did not keep adequate records on commercial limits in children's TV programs. On March 9, 2007, the fine was reduced to $8,000 on the basis that the station had "a history of overall compliance with the Commission’s rules". The FCC eventually waived the fine on KCFG, but instead, KM was admonished "for its willful and repeated violation".
