= KDUL-LP =

Television station in Duluth, Minnesota (2000–2001)

- Duluth, Minnesota; United States
- Channels: Analog: 12 (VHF)

Programming
- Affiliations: UPN, AIN

Ownership
- Owner: Duluth TV Partners, GP
- Operator: ESI Broadcasting

History
- First air date: September 14, 2000
- Last air date: August 31, 2001
- Former call signs: K60EZ (1992–2000)
- Former channel numbers: Analog: 60 (UHF, 1990s–2000)
- Call sign meaning: Duluth

Technical information
- Licensing authority: FCC
- Facility ID: 52444
- Class: TX
- ERP: 0.253 kW
- HAAT: 290 m (951 ft)
- Transmitter coordinates: 46°47′27.6″N 92°6′57.59″W

Links
- Public license information: LMS

KDUL-LP (channel 12) was a low-power television station in Duluth, Minnesota, United States, which operated from October 2000 to August 2001. The station was owned by Duluth TV Partners and managed by ESI Broadcasting. KDUL-LP's office and master control were located in Fitger's Brewery Complex, a popular shopping and entertainment venue. Its transmitter was located on Duluth's Observation Hill.

== History ==
KDUL-LP was originally K60EZ (channel 60), which carried a scrambled version of Nickelodeon as part of an eight-channel subscription TV service which operated between 1993 and 1998.

The existence of KDUL-LP was announced in Duluth in January 2000, with a planned April debut, as a UPN affiliate with additional programs from America One as well as a local show, The Average Guys, that had been airing on public-access television. The station was owned by Duluth TV Partners and managed by ESI Broadcasting, which owned television stations in multiple states and had acquired the license originally from Tiger Eye Broadcasting. KDUL-LP would have offices in the Fitger's Brewery Complex and a transmitter on a tower owned by Shockley Communications. The April date was missed, and a May 15 launch was promised; by July, critical equipment had yet to arrive. The secondary network had changed from America One to the American Independent Network. ESI also acquired W25CA in Ashland, Wisconsin, with plans to run the station from the KDUL-LP facilities.

KDUL-LP began broadcasting on September 14, 2000, at half power. It initially struggled to air the American Independent Network programs and broadcast at half power. When it debuted, KBJR-TV lost the ability to air new episodes of Star Trek: Voyager, and UPN programs on KMSP-TV on the local cable system were blacked out. ESI lacked the funds to fix all the technical problems, some of which stemmed from the studio's proximity to the radar of ships passing on Lake Superior. Additionally, cash flow was poor, as advertisers shunned the station due to its delayed start and reduced reach. By June 2001, the station had one employee and was in danger of leaving the air at the end of the month when its lease expired. ESI withdrew from its attempted purchase of the Ashland station. After July 1, the station was managed by the National Bank of Commerce.

KDUL ceased broadcasting on August 31, 2001, when the transmitter was turned off by Midwest Communications, which bought Shockley's Duluth radio operations. The studios were managed for another three weeks until a new tenant leased the space. KBJR resumed its secondary affiliation with UPN to air the new Star Trek: Enterprise. During its entire run on Channel 12, KDUL-LP operated under program test authority. The construction permit for Channel 12 was canceled after KDUL-LP went silent. The Federal Communications Commission (FCC) deleted KDUL-LP on May 15, 2008, nearly seven years after its last broadcast.
