= Kirby Buckets =

American television series

- Genre: Comedy
- Created by: Gabe Snyder; Mike Alber
- Starring: Jacob Bertrand; Mekai Curtis; Cade Sutton; Olivia Stuck; Tiffany Espensen
- Country of origin: United States
- Original language: English
- No. of seasons: 3
- No. of episodes: 59 (list of episodes)

Production
- Executive producers: Gabe Snyder; Mike Alber; Kristofor Brown
- Camera setup: Single-camera
- Running time: 22–23 minutes
- Production companies: Horizon Productions, Inc; Titmouse, Inc. (animation)

Original release
- Network: Disney XD
- Release: October 20, 2014 – February 2, 2017

Kirby Buckets is an American comedy television series that aired on Disney XD from October 20, 2014 to February 2, 2017. Although a live-action series, the series also includes animated cartoon sequences of Kirby's drawings. The series stars Jacob Bertrand, Olivia Stuck, Mekai Curtis, Cade Sutton, and Tiffany Espensen.

== Plot ==
Kirby Buckets dreams of becoming a famous animator like his idol, Mac McCallister, and interacts with his cartoon creations. Similar to Nicholas Martin in McGee and Me!, Kirby sees his drawings take shape as he and his two best friends, Fish and Eli, go on outrageous and unpredictable adventures.

In the third season, Kirby is sued by Dawn and forbidden from drawing ever again. During a trip to the principal's office he finds a small orb device which allows him to travel to alternate realities. Using it, Kirby accidentally sends his parents to an alternate dimension, and picks up their counterparts from a Mad Max-like universe. Now Kirby must find his parents, while having a little fun along the way.

== Episodes ==
Season	Episodes	Originally released	
Season	Episodes	First released	Last released
1	21	October 20, 2014	August 19, 2015
2	25	October 7, 2015	August 29, 2016
3	13	January 16, 2017	February 2, 2017

== Cast and characters ==
=== Main ===
- Jacob Bertrand as Kirby Buckets, a boy who dreams of becoming a famous animator
- Mekai Curtis as Fish, Kirby's best friend alongside Eli
- Cade Sutton as Eli, Kirby's best friend alongside Fish
- Olivia Stuck as Dawn Buckets, Kirby's older sister who dislikes Kirby’s drawings of her
- Tiffany Espensen as Belinda, Dawn's best friend

=== Recurring ===
- Suzi Barrett as Mom, Kirby's mother
- Michael Naughton as Dad, Kirby's father
- Stephen Kearin as Principal Mitchell, the principal at Kirby's school
- Jack Foley as Big Ricky, a student at Kirby's school

== Production ==
Disney XD first developed and piloted Kirby Buckets in 2012 with producers Gabe Snyder and Mike Alber, David Bowers, and Kristofor Brown. Kirby Buckets was picked up as a series in February 2014. Production started in summer 2014 set for a fall 2014 premiere. On January 13, 2015, the series was renewed for a second season with production resuming in March. The second season premiered on October 7, 2015. On March 4, 2016, Disney XD renewed the series for a third season. The third season premiered on January 16, 2017.

== Broadcast ==
Kirby Buckets premiered on Disney XD in Australia on April 11, 2015, and in New Zealand on April 14, 2015.

== Ratings ==
Viewership and ratings per season of Kirby Buckets
Season	Episodes	First aired		Last aired		Avg. viewers (millions)
Season	Episodes	Date	Viewers (millions)	Date	Viewers (millions)	Avg. viewers (millions)
1	13	October 20, 2014	0.69	August 19, 2015	0.35	0.47
2	21	October 7, 2015	0.36	August 29, 2016	0.18	0.32
3	12	January 16, 2017	0.14	February 2, 2017	0.16	0.14
