= New Urban Entertainment Television =

American cable television network

New Urban Entertainment Television (NUE-TV) was an American cable network targeted toward African-American audiences. It was a direct competitor to Black Entertainment Television (BET), but was aiming for a more mature audience with more news. It operated between July 17, 2000 and October 31, 2002 and reached close to 3 million subscribers. In 2003, it was permanently shut down due to financial difficulties. A big investor was Radio One and many employees came from BET.

== See also ==
- Black Entertainment Television
- Urban One
- Black Family Channel (formerly MBC)
