= 2026 in American television =

Certain American television events in 2026 have been scheduled. Events listed include television show debuts, finales, and cancellations; channel launches, closures, and rebrandings; stations changing or adding their network affiliations; information on controversies, business transactions, and carriage disputes; and deaths of those who made various contributions to the medium.

== Notable events ==
=== January ===
Date	Event	Ref.
2	The spinoff of cable channels previously owned by NBCUniversal (among them CNBC, MS NOW (formerly MSNBC), and USA Network) into a separate publicly traded company controlled by Comcast shareholders called Versant formally completes just before midnight (ET). Bravo remained under the NBCUniversal umbrella, due to the channel being a major content provider to Peacock.	
3	Two days before he was originally scheduled to do so, and in order to cover the U.S. attack on Venezuela and arrest of its president Nicolás Maduro, Tony Dokoupil makes his first appearance as anchor of the CBS Evening News.	
4	The 31st Critics' Choice Awards airs on E! and USA Network from the Barker Hangar in Santa Monica, California. Chelsea Handler returns for her fourth consecutive year as host.	
5	The board of the Corporation for Public Broadcasting formally votes to dissolve the organization, a move that comes six months after a rescission act was signed into law by president Donald Trump that withdrew $1.1 billion in funding to CPB, which it used to fund PBS, radio counterpart NPR, and most notably local member stations and their parent organizations who relied more heavily on federal funds to cover the costs of station operations and programs.	
8	Nine Major League Baseball teams (the St. Louis Cardinals, Milwaukee Brewers, Atlanta Braves, Los Angeles Angels, Cincinnati Reds, Kansas City Royals and Detroit Tigers, as well as both Florida teams) announce they had terminated their contracts with FanDuel Sports Network and would explore transitioning to other unspecified platforms. The move comes as FDSN parent Main Street Sports Group, which exited a lengthy bankruptcy process at the beginning of 2025, reportedly missed a rights payment deadline for the Cardinals among the 29 MLB, NBA, and NHL teams whose games are carried by FDSN, and a proposal to sell itself to British-based streaming service DAZN (and avoid a shutdown of operations) reportedly failed.	
11	The 83rd Golden Globe Awards airs on CBS from The Beverly Hilton with Nikki Glaser as host.	
12	Three days before it was scheduled to air, an episode of Law & Order: Special Victims Unit guest starring Timothy Busfield is removed from the schedule after an arrest warrant was issued for the actor following allegations of child sexual abuse made against him by the parents of child actors from Fox's The Cleaning Lady, a series canceled several months before where he served as a director and executive producer.	
14	The Washington Nationals announce they would become the seventh Major League Baseball team to join the league's in-house service, MLB Local Media, for production and distribution of their local television broadcasts beginning with the 2026 season. The move means an end to the Nationals' 21-year relationship with MASN, the regional network primarily owned by the Baltimore Orioles that involuntarily controlled the Nats' television rights since that club relocated from Montreal to Washington, D.C. in 2005, which had long been part of the Orioles' home territory.	(Note: The Seattle Mariners also had their local broadcasts distributed by MLB Local Media beginning in 2026; the Mariners announced their move in 2025, as the network that carried their games, Root Sports Northwest, shut down.)
26	Amid the ongoing effort to acquire Warner Bros. Discovery and the potential split of its cable assets, the company signs a six-year contract ensuring WBD-owned Turner Classic Movies access to the Looney Tunes and Merrie Melodies filmography, which began airing on the channel on February 2.	
30	Amid the national shutdown by the University of Minnesota, the ABC medical drama Grey's Anatomy pauses production for the day after its crew members were absent in support. Filming resumed the following day.	
31	The Walt Disney Company and the National Football League announce that, with federal regulators having granted approval, they have completed a deal to have the NFL acquire a 10% stake in Disney's ESPN, in exchange for NFL Network and NFL RedZone becoming ESPN-owned-and-operated networks.	

=== February ===
Date	Event	Ref.
1	The 68th Annual Grammy Awards airs on CBS from Los Angeles' Crypto.com Arena, and streams on Paramount+. Notable winners include Bad Bunny's Debí Tirar Más Fotos (for Album of the Year), Kendrick Lamar and SZA's "Luther" (for Record of the Year), and Billie Eilish and Finneas O'Connell's "Wildflower" (for Song of the Year). Trevor Noah returned as the host for the sixth consecutive year, and according to producer Ben Winston, it was Noah's final time hosting the event. It was also the final Grammys ceremony to be broadcast by CBS, ending a 53-year run for the network that began in 1973; Disney-ABC is set to begin a ten-year contract to broadcast the Grammys starting with the 69th ceremony in 2027.	
1	KGO-TV/San Francisco rebrands its newscasts as ABC 7 Eyewitness News and (along with co-owned Los Angeles station KABC-TV) begins using an updated, unified version of the Circle 7 logo in line with their fellow owned-and-operated stations WABC-TV/New York City and WLS-TV/Chicago, marking the first time that the ABC-owned station used the Eyewitness News or Action News brand for its newscasts (The Eyewitness News branding was first used in the Bay Area by CBS station KPIX-TV from 1965 to 1994 and again from 1995 to 2013).	
2	Less than a month after terminating their contracts with FanDuel Sports Network (see 1/8 entry), Major League Baseball's Milwaukee Brewers, Miami Marlins, Kansas City Royals, St. Louis Cardinals, Cincinnati Reds, and Tampa Bay Rays announce they would partner with MLB Local Media for production and distribution of their local telecasts beginning in 2026. The Detroit Tigers would announce on February 9, that both they and the NHL's Detroit Red Wings, both of which are owned by Ilitch Holdings, would also join MLB Local Media.	
5	NBC News and Today co-host Savannah Guthrie announces she would take a leave of absence, in the search of her mother Nancy Guthrie, who was reported missing during the week and later revealed to have been kidnapped from her Tucson, Arizona, home on February 1. Guthrie withdrew from her hosting duties for the opening ceremony of NBC's live coverage of the 2026 Winter Olympics in Milan, Italy. She was replaced by Mary Carillo for the live coverage, while Today co-host Craig Melvin would also withdraw from his co-hosting duties for NBC's Olympics coverage on this date in help for the search. It marked the first time that Guthrie and Melvin missed NBC's Olympics coverage since 2014 and 2016 respectively.	
6–22	The 2026 Winter Olympics airs on NBC and streams on Peacock. Highlights include the American women's and men's ice hockey teams winning the gold medals over their Canadian counterparts in overtime, with the men's ice hockey game (the first gold medal for the men's Team USA since 1980) having 26 million American viewers, ranking among the most-watched hockey telecasts in American history, while the women's game peaked at over seven million viewers during its overtime period, a record for a women's hockey telecast.	
8	The Seattle Seahawks defeat the New England Patriots 29–13 to win Super Bowl LX, which was broadcast at Levi's Stadium in Santa Clara on NBC, with Spanish language coverage on Telemundo and streaming on Peacock. The game drew particular attention for its halftime show with Puerto Rican rapper Bad Bunny as its headliner, who performed his set almost entirely in Spanish (a first for the event); opposition to the selection led to a competing halftime counterprogram, the All-American Halftime Show, featuring country musicians and drawing several million viewers against the official broadcast.	
11	On the day Rehab Addict was scheduled to return on HGTV with new episodes, the network announces the show's immediate cancellation and removal from HBO Max and Discovery+, as well as the firing of its host, Nicole Curtis, following a video being posted online of Curtis using a racial slur during filming for the series.	
11	Charter Communications announces it would purchase New England Cable News from NBCUniversal, and that it would merge NECN's operations with Spectrum News channels in New England (including those in Massachusetts and Maine) under the name Spectrum News NECN.	
13	Following the death of James Van Der Beek due to colorectal cancer, Fox announces it would reair the special The Real Full Monty on February 18 to honor the actor, replacing repeats of The Masked Singer and Fear Factor: House of Fear. A QR code was displayed throughout the broadcast to encourage viewers to donate to the Colorectal Cancer Alliance.	
13	With the sale of its last remaining broadcast license, WTVH/Syracuse, New York, to Deerfield Media, Granite Broadcasting discontinues operations.	
16	Anderson Cooper departs as a correspondent for 60 Minutes after contributing to the news program since 2006. His departure came amidst turbulence within CBS's news division.	
26	Hours after the board of Warner Bros. Discovery declares an increased competing bid by Paramount Skydance superior, Netflix, Inc. announces it would decline to add to the $83 billion purchase price it struck in a December 2025 agreement with WBD and not match Paramount's bid. Pending regulatory approval, this leads to Paramount to acquire all of WBD including its film and television production operations and cable networks including CNN, TBS, and TNT (Netflix had intended to only acquire WBD's film and television studios as well as the HBO premium channels and HBO Max, while the cable networks would have been spun off to a separate company).	
28	While anchoring CNN and CNN International's overnight breaking news coverage on the strikes in Iran by Israeli and the United States on CNN Newsroom, at the network's studio in Abu Dhabi, host Becky Anderson was forced to evacuate as the tones of the city's emergency sirens became audible in the background of the studio feed.	

=== March ===
Date	Event	Ref.
1	The 32nd Actor Awards (formerly the Screen Actors Guild Awards) streams live on Netflix.	
9	Instead of aligning with MLB Local Media as other teams formerly shown on FanDuel Sports Network had done (see 2/2 entry), Major League Baseball's Los Angeles Angels announce they would instead buy Main Street Sports Group's portion of FanDuel Sports Network West, which would continue operation under that name and serve as local television home to the Angels and, through at least its 2026–2027 season, the NHL's Los Angeles Kings.	
13	NBCUniversal announces that it would discontinue producing first-run content for broadcast syndication, resulting in the cancellations of its remaining programming, including the entertainment newsmagazine Access Hollywood (and its daytime counterpart Access Daily) and the daytime talk shows Karamo, and The Steve Wilkos Show. The decision comes a month after The Kelly Clarkson Show (also produced by NBCU) was announced to end after its seventh season. New episodes of the cancelled shows continued to be released to stations through September, and reruns from the NBCU library continuing to be available to stations.	
15	The 98th Academy Awards airs on ABC from the Dolby Theatre in Los Angeles. Conan O'Brien returned as host for the second consecutive year.	
16	Reruns of the 1985–1992 NBC sitcom The Golden Girls return to broadcast television for the first time since the end of its off-network syndication run in 1997, as Weigel's classic television service MeTV begins carrying the series, which had been exclusive to pay television channels and services during that period and remained popular among viewers of all ages in that time span. The Golden Girls continues to be available on pay television channels and streaming services, in addition to its return to broadcast television.	
19	The FCC votes to approve Nexstar Media Group's $6.2 billion acquisition of fellow station operator Tegna. Hours later, the companies announce their merger was complete, creating a company that owns and operates 265 stations in 44 states and D.C. The deal, however, is met with criticism by attorney generals in eight states, along with satellite operator DirecTV, who on March 20, file temporary restraining orders to block the merger out of concerns over job losses in markets where the combined Nexstar–Tegna own multiple stations, as well as the increased leverage the company would exert on cable and satellite distributors to pay more in retransmission fees to carry their channels. On March 26, U.S. District judge Troy Nunley of California's Eastern District orders a fourteen-day temporary restraining order on the merger, saying that "private benefits Nexstar could obtain by acquiring Tegna are outweighed by the harm to" DirecTV; the judge orders Nexstar and Tegna to pause integration efforts and operate separately, and also sets an April 7 hearing on whether a more permanent injunction to halt the deal should be made.	
19	Three days before its twenty-second season was scheduled to premiere on March 22, ABC pulls The Bachelorette from its lineup amid a domestic assault investigation against star Taylor Frankie Paul.	
26	The 2026 iHeartRadio Music Awards airs on Fox from Los Angeles' Dolby Theatre with Ludacris as host.	
31	A carriage dispute begins between Xfinity and the E. W. Scripps Company, causing affiliate stations owned by Scripps to be removed from Xfinity.	

=== April ===
Date	Event	Ref.
10	Paramount Skydance announces that Nickelodeon Animation Studio would no longer operate as a separate company and would be a label of CBS Eye Animation Productions with Alec Botnick serving as president.	
17	QVC Group, owner of the QVC and HSN shopping channels, files for Chapter 11 bankruptcy, which company CEO David Rawlinson states it was made to ease into a transition from television to social media retailing.	
17	Ten days after a hearing on the Nexstar–Tegna merger (see 3/19 entry), U.S. District Court Judge for Eastern California Troy Nunley issues a preliminary injunction, effective April 21, that halts the merger on grounds that it would hinder competition and violate antitrust laws. Nexstar indicates that they would appeal the ruling.	
18–19	WrestleMania 42 broadcasts from Allegiant Stadium in Las Vegas on ESPN. It was originally set to be held in New Orleans, but was moved to Las Vegas. This was the second time WrestleMania was held at the same venue in consecutive years, after WrestleMania IV and WrestleMania V in 1988 and 1989, which were held at the Boardwalk Hall in Atlantic City.	
19	Hours before it was to premiere on ESPN2, the documentary Rachel, Breathe is removed from the schedule, with the film's director/co-producer, Frank Marshall, indicating on social media that the reason was a disagreement with ESPN over rights to the film, which documents the story of Rachel Foster's recovery from a lengthy coma to compete in, and finish, the 2023 Boston Marathon five months later.	
25	Kenny Albert calls TNT Sports' broadcast of a National Hockey League playoff game between the Pittsburgh Penguins and Philadelphia Flyers; this marks Albert's 1,545th national television game assignment among the four major North American pro sports leagues (NHL, NFL, NBA, and Major League Baseball), setting the record for a play-by-play announcer (surpassing Dick Stockton's 1,544).	

=== May ===
Date	Event	Ref.
12–16	The 70th anniversary edition of the Eurovision Song Contest (held at Wiener Stadthalle in Vienna, Austria) streams live on Peacock and YouTube, marking the first time that the song competition is broadcast via live streaming on the video streaming platform in the United States in almost a decade. The move comes after the European Broadcasting Union (EBU) (to which Peacock's sister broadcast network and major content provider NBC is among the alliance of public service media organizations' American associate member broadcasters) addressed several controversies, including Israel's participation in the context of the Gaza and Iran wars, that led to five countries withdrawing from the competition, Iceland, Ireland, the Netherlands, Slovenia, and "Big Five" member country Spain, who participated each year since 1961. As a result, this is the largest number of non-participating countries in the contest's history since the 1970 edition. Bulgaria (represented by singer-songwriter Dara with the song "Bangaranga") wins the competition with 516 points, marking the country's first Eurovision win and the first entry to win both the jury vote and televote since Portugal (represented by Salvador Sobral with "Amar pelos dois") in 2017, as well as setting the record for the largest winning margin at 173 points, surpassing Norway's margin of 169 points with Alexander Rybak's "Fairytale" in 2009.	
17	The 61st Academy of Country Music Awards streams live on Prime Video from the MGM Grand Garden Arena in Las Vegas, with Shania Twain as host.	
21	After eleven years, The Late Show with Stephen Colbert airs its final episode, and with it, CBS discontinues its franchise that originated with David Letterman in 1993, and producing original programming in the 11:30 p.m. (ET) time slot that follows local news. CBS cites the cancellation was due to financial reasons and a decline in advertising revenue for its late-night programming. The move came one year after CBS canceled After Midnight (which aired in the slot following The Late Show) and sold that airtime to Allen Media Group for Comics Unleashed. Following Late Show's conclusion, Comics Unleashed was moved to the time slot, as Allen purchased another hour of late-night airtime from CBS and used it for the 2017 revival of Funny You Should Ask in the 12:35 a.m. (ET) time slot.	
25	The 52nd American Music Awards airs on CBS from Las Vegas' MGM Grand Garden Arena, with Queen Latifah hosting for the first time since 1995.	
27	Sharyn Alfonsi reveals that CBS News would not renew her contract and dismiss her once it expires. Alfonsi had been a correspondent with 60 Minutes, and had been critical of CBS leadership over her report that examined poor conditions at El Salvador's Terrorism Confinement Center, where Venezuelan migrants to the U.S. (some of whom were in the country legally) were being deported was pulled hours before it was scheduled to air in December 2025. Although it would air one month later mostly unaltered (with a new intro and outro by Alfonsi that included statements from White House and DHS officials), Alfonsi defended the report as thoroughly vetted by CBS' Standards and Practices, and described the decision to pull it from air as a political appeasement to the Trump administration (officials of whom declined to participate in the original story).	
31	Fifty-four local television stations owned by the E. W. Scripps Company are removed from DirecTV over a retransmission dispute.	(Note: KZTV in Corpus Christi, Texas, WFLX in West Palm Beach, Florida, Ion Television, Grit, and Bounce TV were not affected from the dispute as they were carried on a different contract.)

=== June ===
Date	Event	Ref.
2	Scott Pelley reveals that he was fired from 60 Minutes and CBS News after having a verbal confrontation with the program's new executive producer, Nick Bilton, over the direction of the show.	
7	The 79th Tony Awards airs on CBS from New York's Radio City Music Hall, with Pink as host.	
11–July 19	The 2026 FIFA World Cup airs on Fox and FS1 (English language) as well as Telemundo (Spanish language). Jointly hosted in 16 cities across Canada, Mexico, and the United States, the 23rd edition of the tournament is the first to feature three host nations, the first since 1994 to be held in North America, and the first to feature 48 teams.	
12	Longtime WABC-TV/New York City news anchor Bill Ritter announces his retirement from the anchor desk following an early stage Alzheimer's disease diagnosis. Ritter joined the station in September 1999, as an evening anchor, after six years working at ABC News.	
14	UFC Freedom 250 airs on Paramount+ from the South Lawn of the White House.	
15	Fox announces that it plans to acquire streaming device and content provider Roku for $22 billion.	
19	KWQC-TV/Davenport, Iowa morning news anchor Dustin Nolan announces on-air his resignation from the Gray Media-owned NBC affiliate and departure from the television news industry, stating that he believes local news stations "have to be more than trends or sanitized news". Although initially reported as a spur-of-the-moment decision on his part, Nolan later states that his departure had been planned for some time, and that KWQC had been working to fill his role for several weeks prior.	
26	MS NOW announces a restructuring of its weekend programming that features an emphasis on video podcasts and taped programming during primetime hours and content from outside partners, as well as the departure of longtime anchor Alex Witt from the network later in the year.	
26	Linda Cohn anchors her final SportsCenter episode on ESPN before retiring from the network four days later.	
28	The 26th BET Awards airs on BET from the Peacock Theater in Los Angeles, with Druski as host.	
29	Comcast announces a plan to split into two companies, with Comcast retaining its cable and technology operations and NBCUniversal splitting into a separate entity (owned by Comcast shareholders) that includes the NBC and Telemundo broadcast networks, streaming services Peacock and Hayu, as well as cable network Bravo and other related media properties.	
30	Dish DBS, the operator of Dish Network and Sling TV, files for Chapter 11 bankruptcy protection.	

=== July ===
Date	Event	Ref.
1	NJ PBS transfers operations from WNET to Montclair State University after the university made a successful bid to acquire operations from The WNET Group (the original operator of NJ PBS), which announced in 2025, that it would not be able to reach an agreement with the New Jersey Public Broadcasting Authority to renew their agreement.	
3–4	The Walt Disney Company celebrates the United States Semiquincentennial with Disney Celebrates America, an over-24-hour commemoration that airs across Disney-owned networks; including ABC, as well as Freeform, FX, and National Geographic; and the Disney+ and Hulu streaming services. David Muir serves as primary anchor of the round-the-clock coverage that began at 10 PM (ET) on July 3, and ran through 11 PM on July 4.	
7	The New York City studios of WPIX and NewsNation (both operated by Nexstar Media Group) are among several buildings evacuated after debris falls from a building across the street, the result of support structures buckling and floors partially collapsing during a remodeling project. The stations are given the "all clear" to return to their studios later that night, but not before WPIX spends much of its day originating from news vehicles temporarily set up on streets outside the cordoned-off area (NewsNation's daytime programming originated as normal from its base in Chicago).	
15	The 2026 ESPY Awards airs on ABC and ESPN from the David H. Koch Theater in New York City, with Marcello Hernández as host.	
15	Optimum announces that it would consolidate News 12 Networks' news bureaus in The Bronx, Brooklyn, Connecticut, and Westchester County, resulting in approximately thirty employees being dismissed.	
30	The Walt Disney Company announces that it plans to sell its 50% stake in A+E Global Media to Hearst Communications for $1 billion.	

=== August ===
Date	Event	Ref.
6	In a 2–1 vote, the Federal Communications Commission repeals the longstanding television station ownership cap that prevented a single owner from controlling stations that covered more than 39% of U.S. television households. While the repeal would result in open sales or consolidation among station ownership groups, the decision may face legal challenges based on the belief that Congress and not the FCC has the authority to remove the restriction.	
18	ABC files a First Amendment lawsuit against the Federal Communications Commission, claiming that the Trump administration, through investigative and regulatory actions by the FCC (including an early renewal review of the network's broadcast licenses), is retaliating against ABC and its free speech rights based on critiques of President Donald Trump by network personalities (in particular Jimmy Kimmel and the host panel of The View).	
20	Cable television companies Charter Communications and Cox Communications close their $34.5 billion merger, with the combined company transitioning to the Cox Communications corporate name and adopting Charter's Spectrum brand for its cable/internet services to 37 million customers across 45 states.	
21	Less than a week before they were to air both events, The CW removes the 2026 editions of the Miss USA and the Miss Teen USA pageants from its broadcast schedule. The network does not provide a reason for the change, while the pageants, in a statement, cite only "a contractual issue with our production arrangements" that occurred two weeks earlier "could not be resolved within the necessary time frame".	
27	Two days after originally postponing its premiere at the last minute (from August 25 to September 1), Golf Channel announces that the revival of reality competition series The Big Break (titled The Big Break × Good Good) would be removed from the schedule completely. The initial delay was to remove references to a presenting sponsor (reportedly equipment retailer Golf Galaxy) that requested its branding be withdrawn from the show following a commercial for Callaway Golf Company featuring Garrett Clark and other figures from Good Good (the digital media company co-producing Big Break) that included a woman being shoved to the ground; the commercial and scene were criticized as being misogynist in tone and promoting violence against women.	

=== September ===
Date	Event	Ref.
1	Sony Pictures Television suspends Jim Thornton from his role as announcer for Wheel of Fortune amid an investigation stemming from allegations relating to a reported incident involving him and a passenger on an American Airlines flight in May 2026. Three days later, on September 4, he was fired from the show after photos, taken by a passenger who was sitting near Thornton on the Charlotte-to-Los Angeles flight, were released showing a chatroom for pedophilic individuals on his laptop, featuring explicit conversations about children and other sexual material, which he was alleged to have been in for at least 57 minutes. Thornton's attorney claimed that, as a suicide prevention advocate, he regularly visited the Suicide and Crisis Lifeline's chat forum, which has a domain similar to the site that Thornton was allegedly seen visiting, which he claimed was sent to him by an acquaintance. Thornton had served as a guest announcer in 2010, following the death of longtime announcer Charlie O'Donnell, before assuming the role on a permanent basis in 2011. In addition to Thornton's role being recast, the voiceovers he had already recorded for the show's 44th season at the time of his firing were also re-recorded.	
1	For the first time since 2020, Saturday Night Live cast member Kenan Thompson returns to America's Got Talent as a guest judge, filling for main judge Simon Cowell, who was absent following back surgery.	
2	Six National Hockey League teams, the Anaheim Ducks, Carolina Hurricanes, Columbus Blue Jackets, Dallas Stars, Minnesota Wild, and St. Louis Blues, announce they would partner with Amazon Prime Video for local, in-market game broadcasts beginning with the 2026–2027 season. The agreement replaces each team's former media partners as a result of financial difficulties that led to those services' closure: the Ducks and Stars join Prime Video from another streaming service, Victory+, while the Hurricanes, Blue Jackets, Wild, and Blues join after terminating their respective contracts with FanDuel Sports Network (see Closures).	
3	Fox News dismisses Maria Bartiromo from the company, a move the network states was a "business decision". Bartiromo reportedly violated guidance given to employees by Fox News senior staff, stemming from a defamation lawsuit filed by Dominion Voting Systems that Fox settled in 2023 for $787.5 million, concerning claims made by the network's hosts and guests of election fraud in 2020 involving the company's voting machines, to avoid validating President Donald Trump's claims of foreign interference directed towards his campaign during the 2016, 2020 and 2024 presidential elections, despite him winning two of the three, and his longstanding claims that his 2020 loss was the result of rigging being debunked, by communicating to White House officials of the network's decision to limit coverage of Trump's July 16 primetime address, in which he made the election tampering claims to help advocate for the passage of the Safeguard American Voter Eligibility Act. Bartiromo joined Fox in 2014 after two decades at CNBC, and primarily served as the titular anchor of Fox Business' Mornings with Maria (which was renamed to Mornings with Fox Business following her dismissal) and Fox News' Sunday Morning Futures.	
5	Crimetime Saturday ceased operations permanently, and was replaced by CBS Encores beginning with the 2026–27 season.	
14	The 78th Primetime Emmy Awards airs on NBC from Los Angeles' Peacock Theater. Law & Order: Special Victims Unit actress Mariska Hargitay hosted the ceremony, and became the first woman to host the Primetime Emmys since Jane Lynch in 2011; as well as the first host who was not primarily a comedian, comedy series actor, reality host, or news personality since Angela Lansbury in 1993. It was the final Primetime Emmys ceremony to air on broadcast television, as Prime Video is set to began a six-year contract to stream the Primetime Emmys starting in 2027 (see 10/6 entry).	
15	An Airbus AS350 B2 news-gathering helicopter utilized by NBC and Telemundo's Los Angeles owned-and-operated stations, KNBC and KVEA, crashes between two buildings in an industrial storage area in the city's Chatsworth neighborhood around 6:55 p.m. PT, while covering a traffic collision that occurred at a nearby intersection approximately two hours earlier in which an SUV collided into a Los Angeles Metro Bus, killing at least two people and injuring six others. The chopper crash killed reporter Eliana Moreno and pilot George Marciniw, who worked for the NBCUniversal-owned West Coast flagship stations under a helicopter leasing agreement with Pacoima-based aerial production services firm Angel City Air, along with another person on the ground; four cars and two storage containers in the vicinity of the crash site were damaged due to the resulting fire.	
19	CNN and MS NOW journalists are denied access to the White House a day after President Donald Trump announced that he would be banning both networks, as well as the political news website Politico, from the White House.	
27	The 2026 MTV Video Music Awards, hosted by Snoop Dogg, simulcasts on CBS and MTV from the Peacock Theater in Los Angeles, with streaming on Paramount+.	

=== October ===
Date	Event	Ref.
2	CBS Sports announced that their lead NFL game analyst Tony Romo had departed from the network. Romo, who had been with CBS since 2017, was placed on indefinite leave by the network on July 31 following his arrest in Milwaukee on suspicion of operating a motor vehicle while intoxicated, for which Romo pleaded no contest to the citation. J. J. Watt, who had been a fill-in analyst for Romo since the start of the 2026 NFL season, remained in that role and became Romo's permanent replacement soon after.	
2	The Wizard of Oz airs on broadcast television for the first time since 2005, as the Weigel-owned classic terrestrial television network MeTV and Nexstar's The CW acquire broadcast rights to the film, which first aired on television in 1956, and had aired almost annually on broadcast television until moving exclusively to cable television beginning in 2006 (as a result of The WB being merged into The CW network). MeTV aired The Wizard of Oz several times as part of its Halloween lineup, while the CW will air the film twice on November 25 and December 20.	
6	Paramount Skydance closes its $110.9 billion purchase of Warner Bros. Discovery, forming Skydance Corporation. The merger results in the combined company owning television networks such as CBS, TBS, TNT, CNN, Discovery Channel, Cartoon Network, Food Network, MTV, Nickelodeon, BET, Comedy Central, HBO and Showtime (giving it ownership of approximately one-third of all linear basic pay channels and two of the four major U.S. premium services), streaming services HBO Max and Paramount+, as well as the Paramount and Warner Bros. film and television studios, which continue to operate separately under the terms of various settlements with state, federal and international authorities under antitrust law.	
6	The Academy of Television Arts & Sciences announces that its Primetime Emmy Awards ceremonies would move to Amazon Prime Video in a six year, global-exclusive deal that will begin with the September 2027 ceremony. The move to streaming concludes the 77-year run of the Primetime Emmys on broadcast television that began with the first ceremony in 1949, moved to national broadcasts in 1955, and had aired on a rotating basis among the four major broadcast networks (ABC, CBS, Fox, and NBC) since 1995. The move to Prime Video also means that the Emmys will be the first of the EGOT award ceremonies (the Emmys, Grammys, Oscars, and Tonys) to air exclusively on a streaming platform.	(Note: In December 2025, the Academy of Motion Picture Arts and Sciences was the first EGOT organization to announce that it would be moving its award ceremonies out of broadcast television; the Academy Awards will move from ABC to YouTube in 2029.)
17	Val Chmerkovskiy is temporarily suspended from Dancing with the Stars, after making a remark alluding to the incident at the 94th Academy Awards, in which Will Smith slapped Chris Rock over a monologue joke about Smith's wife Jada Pinkett Smith, in a TikTok story post directed at judge Carrie Ann Inaba’s criticism of a foxtrot routine performed by actor Harry Shum Jr. and pro partner Jenna Johnson (the latter whom Chmerkovskiy married in 2019) during the October 13 "Super Bowl Night" episode, in which Inaba observed an improper lift during their performance. In his place, Chmerkovskiy's celebrity partner, actress Jenna Dewan, performed her Viennese waltz in the October 20 "Dedication Night" episode with pro dancer Alan Bersten, who was paired earlier in season 35 with chef Giada De Laurentiis until they were eliminated from the show on September 22. Chmerkovskiy returned to the competition following that week's episode.	
18	For the first time since the season 29 premiere episode "The Serfsons" in October 2017, The Simpsons character Apu Nahasapeemapetilon is heard in the season 38 episode "Treehouse of Horror Presents: The Revengening", with Indian-American actor Sunil Malhotra now voicing Apu. The character (an Indian immigrant who runs the Kwik-E-Mart convenience store) and the actor who previously voiced him (Hank Azaria, a white actor) faced criticism after the 2017 documentary The Problem with Apu accused both of negatively fostering South Asian stereotypes; in response, Azaria departed from voicing Apu, who from 2017 until this date only occasionally appeared in non-speaking situations.	
19	Christiane Amanpour announces she would leave CNN in June 2027. Amanpour had been with CNN for 43 years; she would maintain a weekly show for CNN until the end of 2026, when daily production on both her CNN International show Amanpour as well as her show for PBS, Amanpour & Company will end.	
22	Bianna Golodryga announces that she is leaving CNN after being with the network for nine years.	
28	Ernie Johnson Jr. announces that he is retiring from the TNT Sports-produced ESPN NBA game review program Inside the NBA after the 2026-27 NBA season, which will end a run that lasted over 35 years.	

=== November ===
Date	Event	Ref.
7	Druski hosts NBC's Saturday Night Live, and by doing so he makes history to become the first digital content creator to guest host on the show.	
9	ESPN announces it has extended its rights to the College Football Playoff in a new deal that begins with the 2027 season (when the CFP will expand from 12 to 24 teams) and run through 2032.	
14	The 2026 Kids' Choice Awards simulcasts on CBS and Nickelodeon from Television City in Los Angeles, with Alex Warren as host. This was the first Kids' Choice Awards ceremony to air on CBS and on broadcast television, as well as the first ceremony to be held in November since 1992.	
16	Willie Geist announces he will depart MS NOW's Morning Joe at the end of the year, and will focus on NBC News's Sunday Today with Willie Geist and expanding his presence on Today. Geist, who was able to work with both NBC News and MS NOW following the latter's spin-off from NBCUniversal into Versant, said it was "never intended to last forever".	
18	Skydance announces it will combine the television studios of Paramount and Warner Bros. into a single entity in 2027 under the name Warner Bros. Television Studios. Skydance-owned CBS' own self-named studio will remain a standalone unit, though its BET Studios will be placed under Warner Bros. Television Studios' watch.	
18	The 60th Annual Country Music Association Awards airs on ABC from Nashville, Tennessee, with Lainey Wilson returning for her third consecutive year as host.	

== Future events ==
=== November ===
Date	Event	Ref.
27	The Soul Train Music Awards will air on television for the first time since 2023 from the Harris Theater in Chicago. The 2026 ceremony will simulcast on BET and CBS, making it the first Soul Train Music Awards ceremony to air on CBS and the first to air on broadcast television since 2007, and the return of Soul Train branded content to over-the-air television 20 years after its flagship series ended on first run syndication in 2006. Anthony Anderson is set to host the ceremony for the first time since 2013.	

=== December ===
Date	Event	Ref

== Television shows ==
=== Shows debuting in 2026 ===
First aired	Title	Channel	Source
January 1	The Cult of the Real Housewife	TLC	
January 1	Second Chance Love	Hallmark+	
January 1	Crime in Progress	A&E	
January 3	Donkey King	Weekend Adventure (ABC stations)	
January 4	Best Medicine	Fox	
January 5	Baking Championship: Next Gen	Food Network	
January 6	The Cult Behind the Killer: The Andrea Yates Story	Investigation Discovery	
January 7	Harlan Coben's Final Twist	CBS	
January 7	Leader's Playbook	CNBC	
January 7	Neighborhood Watch	HGTV	
January 8	His & Hers	Netflix	
January 8	The Valley: Persian Style	Bravo	
January 10	Maxxed Out	OWN	
January 13	Hey A.J.!	Disney Jr.	
January 13	Suddenly Amish	TLC	
January 13	Killer Confessions: Case Files of a Texas Ranger	Investigation Discovery	
January 13	Pole to Pole with Will Smith	Disney+	
January 14	Dirty Talk: When Daytime Talk Shows Ruled TV	ABC	
January 15	Star Trek: Starfleet Academy	Paramount+	
January 15	Ponies	Peacock	
January 17	Iyanla: The Inside Fix	OWN	
January 18	A Knight of the Seven Kingdoms	HBO	
January 18	The Hillside Strangler	MGM+	
January 18	The Fall and Rise of Reggie Dinkins	NBC	
January 19	120 Hours Behind Bars	Discovery Channel	
January 20	Handsome Devil: Charming Killer	Paramount+	
January 21	The Beauty	FX/Hulu	
January 22	Free Bert	Netflix	
January 22	Finding Her Edge	Netflix	
January 22	Mel Brooks: The 99 Year Old Man!	HBO	
January 25	Memory of a Killer	Fox	
January 25	It's Not Like That	Amazon Prime Video	
January 26	History's Deadliest with Ving Rhames	History Channel	
January 27	Wonder Man	Disney+	
January 30	On the Edge: World Cup Ski Racing	ESPN	
February 1	L.A. Firestorm: Inside the Inferno	Reelz	
February 1	Rise of the 49ers	AMC/AMC+	
February 1	Vanished	MGM+	
February 2	Phoebe & Jay	PBS Kids	
February 3	Black & Jewish America: An Interwoven History	PBS	
February 4	The Coach Vick Experience	BET	
February 6	The White House	Fox Nation	
February 8	The 'Burbs	Peacock	
February 11	Origin: The Story of the Basketball Africa League	ESPN	
February 11	The Scream Murder: A True Teen Horror Story	Hulu	
February 12	Soul Power: The Legend of the American Basketball Association	Amazon Prime Video	
February 12	Love Story	FX/Hulu	
February 13	Neighbors	HBO	
February 15	Love, Ted Bundy	Oxygen	
February 16	Reality Check: Inside America's Next Top Model	Netflix	
February 18	56 Days	Amazon Prime Video	
February 18	Wild Boys: Strangers in Town	Paramount+	
February 19	Murder in Glitterball City	HBO	
February 19	Girl on the Run: The Hunt for America's Most Wanted Woman	Hulu	
February 20	Strip Law	Netflix	
February 22	History's Greatest Picks with Mike Wolfe	History Channel	
February 23	CIA	CBS	
February 23	The CEO Club	Amazon Prime Video	
February 25	The Greatest Average American	ABC	
February 26	The Gray House	Amazon Prime Video	
February 26	David: King of Israel	Fox Nation	
February 28	Crooked on MS NOW	MS NOW	
March 1	Marshals	CBS	
March 1	American Classic	MGM+	
March 1	DTF St. Louis	HBO	
March 1	Disaster: The Chernobyl Meltdown	CNN	
March 2	Bachelor Mansion Takeover	HGTV	
March 2	Wild Vacation Rentals	HGTV	
March 2	BeddyByes	Disney Jr.	
March 2	Bedtime Stories with Ryan	Nick Jr.	
March 3	R.J. Decker	ABC	
March 4	America's Culinary Cup	CBS	
March 4	Flavortown Food Fight	Food Network	
March 4	Dirty Rotten Scandals	E!	
March 4	Body Bizarre	TLC	
March 5	Vladimir	Netflix	
March 5	Predator Hunters	A&E	
March 5	This City Is Ours: A Crime Family Saga	AMC+	
March 6	Friends Like These	Disney+/Hulu	
March 6	The Dinosaurs	Netflix	
March 8	Rooster	HBO	
March 9	The Ultimate Baking Championship	Food Network	
March 11	Scarpetta	Amazon Prime Video	
March 11	Age of Attraction	Netflix	
March 13	Dynasty: The Murdochs	Netflix	
March 13	Celebrity Jeopardy! All-Stars	ABC	
March 14	The Madison	Paramount+	
March 15	Rooster Fighter	Adult Swim	
March 15	Property Brothers: Under Pressure	HGTV	
March 16	Born to Bowl	HBO	
March 18	Imperfect Women	Apple TV	
March 18	Bad Foot Clinic	TLC	
March 19	That Thrifting Show with Lara Spencer	Freeform	
March 21	Hope Valley: 1874	Hallmark+	
March 22	The Faithful: Women of the Bible	Fox	
March 22	Standoff: The FBI, Power and Paranoia	CNN	
March 23	Magicampers	Disney Jr.	
March 25	K9 PD with Jim Belushi	A&E	
March 26	Something Very Bad Is Going to Happen	Netflix	
March 26	Love Overboard	Hulu	
March 27	Martha Graham Dance Company: We Are Our Time	PBS	
March 31	Evil Lives Here: My Child the Killer	Investigation Discovery	
March 31	Secrets of the Bees	Nat Geo	
April 1	Conspiracies & Coverups	Discovery Channel	
April 2	The Real Housewives of Rhode Island	Bravo	
April 4	Made for March	Paramount+	
April 6	Maul – Shadow Lord	Disney+	
April 6	Foul Play with Anthony Davis	TBS	
April 7	Lucy Worsley Investigates: The American Revolution	PBS	
April 8	The Testaments	Hulu	
April 9	The Miniature Wife	Peacock	
April 9	Big Mistakes	Netflix	
April 10	Belle Collective: Birmingham	OWN	
April 11	Kara Swisher Wants to Live Forever	CNN	
April 11	Building Back America's Trades	Magnolia Network	
April 11	Million Dollar Mountain Homes	A&E	
April 12	The Audacity	AMC/AMC+	
April 12	Eva Longoria: Searching for France	CNN	
April 13	Boy Band Confidential: A Hollywood Demons Event	Investigation Discovery	
April 14	You Don't Know Where I'm From, Dawg	Paramount+	
April 14	The Dark Wizard	HBO	
April 14	World's Bargain Dream Homes	HGTV	
April 15	Margo's Got Money Troubles	Apple TV	
April 15	One Day in My Body	TLC	
April 20	Kevin	Amazon Prime Video	
April 20	4X20: Quick Hits	Hulu	
April 20	Funny AF with Kevin Hart	Netflix	
April 22	Killing Grounds: The Gilgo Beach Murders	Amazon Prime Video	
April 22	This Is a Gardening Show	Netflix	
April 22	Hulk Hogan: Real American	Netflix	
April 23	Stranger Things: Tales from '85	Netflix	
April 23	Sugarcreek Amish Mysteries	UPtv	
April 24	My Brother the Minotaur	Apple TV	
April 27	This First House	The Roku Channel	
April 28	My Killer Father: The Green Hollow Murders	Paramount+	
April 28	The Cult of Natureboy	Hulu	
April 29	Widow's Bay	Apple TV	
April 29	Shared Planet	PBS	
April 30	Man on Fire	Netflix	
May 5	Designed to Last	Hulu	
May 7	M.I.A.	Peacock	
May 7	Mom's the Bride	Hallmark+	
May 10	Home Town: Inn This Together	HGTV	
May 12	U.S. Against the World: Four Years with the Men's National Soccer Team	HBO	
May 12	Chopped Castaways	Food Network	
May 12	Squatters	A&E	
May 12	Last Train to North America	ESPN	
May 13	The Face Doctors	TLC	
May 13	Off Campus	Amazon Prime Video	
May 14	Nemesis	Netflix	
May 14	The Old Stories: Moses	Amazon Prime Video	
May 15	Dutton Ranch	Paramount+	
May 17	Naked and Afraid: Global Showdown	Discovery Channel	
May 17	In the Eye of the Storm: Chasers	Discovery Channel	
May 18	You're Killing Me	Acorn TV	
May 19	In the City	Bravo	
May 19	The Nightmare Upstairs: What Happened to Ty and Bryn?	Hulu	
May 20	Maximum Pleasure Guaranteed	Apple TV	
May 21	The Boroughs	Netflix	
May 22	Mating Season	Netflix	
May 22	America's Awesome Kids	PBS Kids	
May 24	The Vampire Lestat: After Dark	AMC+	
May 25	Sofia the First: Royal Magic	Disney Jr.	
May 25	Spider-Noir	MGM+	
May 25	The Many Lives of Benjaman Kyle	Investigation Discovery	
May 25	Food Network's Top 10	Food Network	
May 27	The Other Football	Tubi	
May 28	I Gotta Ask	Amazon Prime Video	
May 29	Star City	Apple TV	
May 29	Calabasas Confidential	Netflix	
May 29	This Is Poly	We TV/All Reality	
May 30	Zombie House Flipping: Family Business	A&E	
May 30	Craig Ferguson: American on Purpose	CNN	
June 1	Bring Me the Beauties: A Model Cult	HBO	
June 2	Not Suitable for Work	Hulu	
June 3	Michael Jackson: The Verdict	Netflix	
June 3	Toon World Express	Tubi	
June 4	Deestroying the Pitch	Tubi	
June 4	Squatters: Get the F*** Out of My House	Hulu	
June 4	The Witness	Netflix	
June 5	Cape Fear	Apple TV	
June 5	Among Us	Paramount+	
June 7	100 Cooks	Food Network	
June 9	Dragon Striker	Disney XD	
June 10	Every Year After	Amazon Prime Video	
June 10	Big Girls Wanted: Escaping Pearadise	Investigation Discovery	
June 10	Outlast: The Jungle	Netflix	
June 11	Surviving Earth	NBC	
June 11	FIFA World Cup on Fox After Hours with James Corden	Fox Sports	
June 11	Mark vs. The Mountain	Great American Pure Flix	
June 12	City Island: USA!	PBS Kids	
June 15	Little Singles	TLC	
June 17	Million Dollar Nannies	Freeform	
June 17	OG Stories	BET	
June 24	The American Experiment	Netflix	
June 26	Life, Larry and the Pursuit of Unhappiness	HBO	
June 26	The Doomies	Disney+	
June 29	Jack Carr Investigates: Carlos the Jackal	Fox Nation	
June 30	Lot Patrol	BET	
July 1	Elle	Amazon Prime Video	
July 1	Road to the Show	Peacock	
July 8	ER: Off the Charts	TLC	
July 8	Guy's Grocery Games: Global Games	Food Network	
July 8	Kitchen Chaos	Food Network	
July 9	Little House on the Prairie	Netflix	
July 9	The Five-Star Weekend	Peacock	
July 9	The Man Will Burn	HBO	
July 12	The Westies	MGM+	
July 13	Dancing with the Stars: The Next Pro	ABC	
July 13	Pitmasters	Food Network	
July 13	Murder 101	Amazon Prime Video	
July 13	Hot Ones: Extra Heat	Netflix	
July 13	Rabbit Hole	Hulu	
July 14	Homestead Rescue: Intervention	Discovery Channel	
July 14	The Real Wolf of Wall Street	Paramount+	
July 15	Lucky	Apple TV	
July 15	Nation's Dumbest	Fox	
July 15	Ride or Die	Amazon Prime Video	
July 16	The Hawk	Netflix	
July 16	Scott Peterson: The New Evidence	A&E	
July 23	Stuart Fails to Save the Universe	HBO Max	
July 24	Roast My Rental	HGTV	
July 24	Breaking Bear	Tubi	
July 26	President Curtis	Adult Swim	
July 27	Furious	Hulu	
July 28	Kitchen Undercover	Food Network	
July 29	House of Stassi	Freeform	
July 29	The Trade with Kelley L. Carter	ESPN+	
July 29	The Idaho Murders: College Nightmare	Netflix	
July 30	Paris Is Always a Good Idea	Hallmark+	
July 31	Fightland	Starz	
July 31	Put a Ring on It: Cheathab	OWN	
August 2	Naked and Afraid: Shipwrecked	Discovery Channel	
August 5	Let's Marry Harry	Netflix	
August 5	Sterling Point	Amazon Prime Video	
August 5	Star Wars: Visions Presents	Disney+	
August 5	The Shards	FX/Hulu	
August 5	How to Catch a Dirtbag	Discovery Channel	
August 6	Monsters of God	HBO	
August 7	Anna Pigeon	USA Network	
August 7	Age Inappropriate	We TV/All Reality	
August 9	The Chosen in the Wild with Bear Grylls	Amazon Prime Video	
August 9	Double Lives of Suburban Wives	TLC	
August 9	NASCAR Americana	USA Network	
August 10	Somebody Knows Something	Freeform	
August 10	State of Play with Peter Alexander	MS NOW	
August 12	Conversations with a Killer: The Charles Manson Tapes	Netflix	
August 13	Jep & Jess: Beyond the Bayou	Great American Pure Flix	
August 16	Lanterns	HBO	
August 18	Cocktail Wars	E!	
August 19	ER: Caught on Camera	TLC	
August 19	Lion	Nat Geo	
August 21	The Dynasty: UConn Huskies	Apple TV	
August 21	The Girls: A Khloé Kardashian Project	Hulu	
August 21	9/11 Reunited	Nat Geo	
August 24	NFL Hometown Eats	The Roku Channel	
August 26	Death of the Pastor's Wife	Netflix	
August 29	Totally '90s House	HGTV	
September 1	The Varnell Hill Show	Paramount+	
September 2	Botched Homes	HGTV	
September 4	Earle Meets World	Netflix	
September 6	A Tale of Two Cities	MGM+	
September 8	The Drop: A Snowfall Saga	FX/Hulu	
September 8	Bobby Flay's The Line	Food Network	
September 8	Dang!	Netflix	
September 9	NFL Play Action	Paramount+	
September 10	A Killer Story	HBO	
September 12	The Assignment with Antonia Hylton	MS NOW	
September 13	High Value Target: The Hunt for Saddam	TNT	
September 13	The Terrors of Jordan Mendoza	Adult Swim	
September 14	Adam's Law	Syndication	
September 15	A Very Haunted Renovation	HGTV	
September 16	Neagley	Amazon Prime Video	
September 16	Ages of Ice	PBS	
September 16	Golden Axe	Paramount+	
September 16	The Great American Road Rally	The CW	
September 17	The Traitors: New Blood	NBC	
September 17	Building Buffalo	ESPN	
September 18	Jay-Z in 8	HBO	
September 19	American Mayhem	Syndication	
September 20	American Hostage	MGM+	
September 20	The Detour with David Chang	CNN	
September 20	Youth	HBO	
September 20	Setting the Tempo	ESPN	
September 21	Line of Fire	NBC	
September 22	House Shock	HGTV	
September 23	Brothers	Apple TV	
September 23	The Golden Ticket	Netflix	
September 24	Team Moms: Baseball	Paramount+	
September 25	S.W.A.T. Exiles	Starz	
September 28	Still Flipping Out	Bravo	
September 29	Secret Life of a Vegas Casino	Discovery Channel	
October 1	War	HBO	
October 1	Coven Academy	Freeform	
October 1	East of Eden	Netflix	
October 1	Archive X: Unexplained Phenomena	AMC+/All Reality/Sundance TV	
October 2	Love After Lockup: Relationship Rehab	We TV/All Reality	
October 2	Bite Size Terror	Tubi	
October 3	Get Jiro	Adult Swim	
October 3	Big Bridal Giveaway	UPtv	
October 5	Super Why's Comic Book Adventures	PBS Kids	
October 5	Sweet Deceit	Food Network	
October 6	NCIS: New York	CBS	
October 7	Carrie	Amazon Prime Video	
October 7	The Serial Killer Connection	Investigation Discovery	
October 8	Eternally Yours	CBS	
October 8	Cupertino	CBS	
October 8	Saban	ESPN	
October 9	Avatar: Seven Havens	Paramount+	
October 9	Great Musicians of Our Time	PBS	
October 11	Treasure Island	MGM+	
October 11	The Pet Cemetery Murders: A Ghost Story	HBO	
October 12	Megan and Cupcake Ready for Preschool	Disney Jr.	
October 13	Tyson	Netflix	
October 14	VisionQuest	Disney+	
October 14	Houdini: Back from the Dead	Fox Nation	
October 14	America's Next Top Cryptid	Tubi	
October 15	Crystal Lake	Peacock	
October 15	Hollywood Arts	Netflix	
October 20	The Golden Life	E!	
October 20	Vanderpump Rules: Lisa Las Vegas	Bravo	
October 20	Nick Cannon @ Night	BET	
October 20	Phony	Hulu	
October 21	Just One Before I Die	Tubi	
October 23	Newlyweds	NBC	
October 25	A Course Called Ireland	Paramount+	
October 26	The Mob	Hulu	
October 26	Minimum Wage	Netflix	
October 27	The One About Matthew Perry	Netflix	
November 1	OJ's Accomplice	Peacock	
November 2	The Promise: Finding My Mother's Killer	Hulu	
November 3	Bass X Machina	Netflix	
November 4	The Greatest	Amazon Prime Video	
November 4	Church Wives	BET	
November 4	MP3	Dropout	
November 6	Awkwafina: The Unlikely Cook	Apple TV	
November 6	Merry Everything!	HSN+/QVC+	
November 7	Cue the Laughs	All Reality/AMC+/IFC	
November 9	Doozie's Doghouse	Netflix	
November 9	The Well	Hulu	
November 10	Love & Hip Hop: The Final Chapter	VH1	
November 10	Get Huge: Looksmaxxing to Death	Hulu	
November 10	Michael Strahan's Iconic	ABC	
November 11	The Body	Netflix	
November 11	The Vow	Fox Nation	
November 12	The Secret Lives of Mormon Wives: Orange County	Hulu	
November 12	The Good Daughter	Peacock	
November 12	Crown of Deceit: Inside the Miss Universe Scandal	TLC	
November 13	12 12 12	Apple TV	
November 13	Snooki: The Paranormal Rookie	All Reality	
November 16	Crime and Punishment in America	PBS	
November 16	America's Funniest People	VH1	
November 17	He Said, She Said: Till Death Do Us Part	Paramount+	
November 18	Win the Mall	Netflix	
November 18	Small Town Trouble: Texas	Bravo	
November 19	The Altruists	Netflix	
November 19	The Airport	Tubi	
November 20	Melania, The Series	Amazon Prime Video	
November 22	Oobah: Scams for a Better Tomorrow	HBO	
November 23	Dig	Peacock	
November 23	The Anania Show	Tubi	
November 23	Billy Bob Thornton Presents: The Mayflower	Fox Nation	
November 23	The Trials of Karen Read	Netflix	
November 23	Ancient Secrets With Erica Hill	CNN	
November 24	I Want to Kill My Boss	Investigation Discovery	
November 25	Andrew Tate: Toxic Empire	Investigation Discovery	
November 25	Blade Runner 2099	Amazon Prime Video	
November 27	The Team: Michigan Football	Fox	
November 28	Salish's 12 Games of Christmas	Netflix	
November 30	The Boy Who Stole Billions?	Amazon Prime Video	
December 1	Collect & Praise	Netflix	
December 1	Trinity	Netflix	
December 3	Can You Hide... Shaq?	ABC/ESPN	
December 3	My Favorite Murder	HBO	
December 8	The Elite: Army Rangers	Paramount+	
December 9	Gabby's Dollhouse: Makers and Bakers	Netflix	
December 10	The Murder of JonBenét Ramsey	Netflix	
December 11	Garfield	Paramount+	
December 14	90 Day: Florida	TLC	
December 15	Sunshine Girls	Netflix	
December 17	Unaccustomed Earth	Netflix	
December 17	Ted: The Animated Series	Peacock	
December 18	Frisco King	Paramount+	
December 18	Raising The Cannons	Netflix	
December 18	Living The Dream	Netflix	
December 25	Harry Potter	HBO	
December 27	Fixer Upper: Chip Bought a Mansion	HGTV/Magnolia Network	
December 30	Life's a Beach	HGTV	
Late	Bad Girls Club: Unfinished Business	Fandango	

=== Shows changing networks ===
Show	Moved from	Moved to	Source
House of Villains	E!	Peacock	
American Dad!	TBS	Fox	
Adults	FX	FXX	
Welcome to Wrexham	FX	FXX/Hulu	
Pop Culture Jeopardy!	Amazon Prime Video	Netflix	
Sunday Night Baseball	ESPN/ESPN2	NBC/Peacock	
MLB Sunday Leadoff	The Roku Channel	NBC/Peacock	
TNA Impact!	AXS TV	AMC/AMC+	
Dana White's Contender Series	ESPN+	Paramount+	
The Ultimate Fighter	ESPN+	Paramount+	
The Ms. Pat Show	BET+	Paramount+	
Divorced Sistas	BET+	Paramount+	
Zatima	BET+	Paramount+	
All the Queen's Men	BET+	Paramount+	
Ruthless	BET+	Paramount+	
Diarra from Detroit	BET+	Paramount+	
Average Joe	BET+	Paramount+	
Lil Kev	BET+	Paramount+	
The Agency	Showtime	Paramount+	
The Challenge	MTV	Paramount+	
Jury Duty	Amazon Freevee	Amazon Prime Video	
NASCAR: Full Speed	Netflix	Amazon Prime Video	
Conan O'Brien Must Go	HBO Max	HBO	

=== Television films and specials ===
First aired	Title	Channel	Source
January 1	I'm Chevy Chase and You're Not	CNN	
January 3	Stolen Girl	Lifetime	
January 3	Lost in Paradise	Hallmark Channel	
January 8	Golden Eve	CBS	
January 10	A Melbourne Match	Hallmark Channel	
January 10	Accused: The Karen Read Story	Lifetime	
January 16	Phineas and Ferb: VENDPOCALYPSE: THE MUSICAL	Disney Channel	
January 17	I Am Mary Jo Buttafuoco	Lifetime	
January 17	Love on the Amazon	Hallmark Channel	
January 22	Disneyland Handcrafted	Disney+	
January 24	Caught by Love	Hallmark Channel	
January 24	Skyscraper Live	Netflix	
January 30	Paw Patrol: Rocky's Cat-astrophe	Nickelodeon	
January 31	Missing the Boat	Hallmark Channel	
January 31	Terry McMillan Presents: Tempted 2 Love	Lifetime	
February 3	The Turpins: A New House of Horror – A Diane Sawyer Special Event	ABC	
February 4	The Muppet Show: Sabrina Carpenter with Seth Rogen	ABC/Disney+	
February 4	Is It Cake? Valentines	Netflix	
February 7	The Way to You	Hallmark Channel	
February 12	Huz: Drawn to Life	PBS	
February 14	Because of Cupid	Hallmark Channel	
February 14	The Dating App Killer: The Monica White Story	Lifetime	
February 17	John and Carolyn – Love, Beauty and Loss	ABC	
February 18	Jesse Jackson: In His Own Words	BET	
February 19	Descendants/ZOMBIES Worlds Collide: Concert Special	Disney Channel	
February 19	TMZ Presents: Michael Jackson: 30 Fatal Seconds	Fox	
February 21	The Stars Between Us	Hallmark Channel	
February 21	Double Double Trouble	Lifetime	
February 21	A CNN & Variety Town Hall Event: Timothée Chalamet and Matthew McConaughey	CNN	
February 27	Chris Fleming: Live at the Palace	HBO	
February 28	Romance at Hope Ranch	Hallmark Channel	
February 28	Pushed off a Plane and Survived	Lifetime	
March 1	Shockwaves: The Attack on Iran	ABC	
March 7	Vanished In an Instant	Lifetime	
March 7	Sugar & Vice: A Hannah Swensen Mystery	Hallmark Channel	
March 10	Fukushima: A Nuclear Nightmare	HBO	
March 12	OWN Spotlight: Roberta	OWN	
March 14	The Boy with My Son's Face	Lifetime	
March 15	The Bachelorette: Before the First Rose	ABC/Hulu	
March 21	I Killed Him in My Sleep	Lifetime	
March 24	Hannah Montana 20th Anniversary Special	Disney+	
March 27	Color Theories by Julio Torres	HBO	
March 28	The Man in the Window	Lifetime	
April 4	Rescued By Faith: The Connie and Larry Van Oosten Story	Lifetime	
April 5	Finding Harry: The Craft Behind The Magic	HBO	
April 5	HBCU AWAREFEST Benefit Concert Special	BET	
April 6	The Neighborhood: A Farewell Special	CBS	
April 10	The Reunion: Laguna Beach	The Roku Channel	
April 10	CBS News: Artemis II Return to Earth	CBS	
April 16	Artemis II: To the Moon and Back	Discovery Channel	
April 17	Ramy Youssef: In Love	HBO	
April 24	America Laughs with Matt Friend	CNN	
May 1	Wowsabout	PBS Kids	
May 2	Kentucky Roses	Hallmark Channel	
May 2	Kidnapped in Her Own Home: The Martha Carelli Story	Lifetime	
May 4	Weather Hunters: Mother's Day Rainbow	PBS Kids	
May 7	We Are Jeni	Investigation Discovery	
May 9	Love, Again	Lifetime	
May 10	Messi: The Forgotten Tape	ESPN	
May 12	The Punisher: One Last Kill	Disney+	
May 12	The Mystery of Richard Simmons: A Diane Sawyer Special	ABC	
May 13	The A List: 15 Stories From Asia And Pacific Diasporas	HBO	
May 14	Fear Factor: 48 Hours of Fear Part 1	Fox	
May 16	The 500: Immortality at Indy	Fox	
May 16	Faith & Forgiveness: A Duck Dynasty Love Story	Lifetime	
May 19	Forever Young: A Grammy Salute to Rod Stewart Live	CBS/Paramount+	
May 21	Fear Factor: 48 Hours of Fear Part 2	Fox	
May 22	Josh Johnson: Symphony	HBO	
May 23	Summer of '94	Fox	
May 23	When I Said I Do	Lifetime	
May 25	Why We Dream	CNN	
May 29	Miss You, Love You	HBO	
May 29	WWE: Made in America	USA Network	
May 30	Where the Heart Lands	Lifetime	
June 6	Thou Shall Not Commit Adultery	Lifetime	
June 6	The Greek Aisle	Hallmark Channel	
June 7	Earth, Wind & Fire (To Be Celestial vs That's the Weight of the World)	HBO	
June 13	The Jealous Bride	Lifetime	
June 13	Texas Two-Step	Hallmark Channel	
June 17	The Simpsons: Extreme Makeover: Homer Edition	Disney+	
June 19	The Clash of Nations: Joe Louis vs. Max Schmeling	History Channel	
June 20	Don't Trust the Girls Upstairs	Lifetime	
June 20	The Love Heist	Hallmark Channel	
June 21	Celebrity Crime Scene: Marilyn Monroe	Fox	
June 22	All American: The Final Season Special	The CW	
June 23	The Welcome Table	HBO	
June 25	CMA Fest Presented by SoFi	ABC	
June 27	Single Black Tenant	Lifetime	
June 27	A Castle of Our Own	Hallmark Channel	
June 29	Disney Celebrates America: The Pursuit of Happiness	ABC	
June 30	Presidential 1776 Award	CBS	
July 2	The Americas: A Wild 250th	NBC	
July 3	The Simpsons: Simpsley	Disney+	
July 3	Independence Eve Live with Anderson & Andy: Celebrating 250	CNN	
July 4	The Great American Block Party 250	CBS	
July 4	Christmas Under Construction	Hallmark Channel	
July 10	This Is UFC: McGregor vs. Holloway	CBS	
July 11	Iyanu: The War of Twin Princes	Cartoon Network	
July 11	O Little Christmas Market	Hallmark Channel	
July 11	He Couldn't Let Go	Lifetime	
July 13	Alma's Way: Alma in Oz: The Musical!	PBS Kids	
July 16	Descendants: Wicked Wonderland	Disney Channel	
July 18	Crowning at the Prom	Lifetime	
July 18	Snowbound for the Holidays	Hallmark Channel	
July 25	Love Under the Mistletoe	Hallmark Channel	
July 25	Girl in the Coffin	Lifetime	
July 26	KPop Shark Heroes	Discovery Channel	
July 30	Mickey Mouse Clubhouse+: Mickey's Country Farm	Disney Jr.	
July 31	Snoopy Presents: There's No Place Like Home, Snoopy	Apple TV	
July 31	Adults: Marathon Day	FXX/Hulu	
August 1	Killer Clown	Lifetime	
August 3	Storm on Sesame Street	Netflix/PBS Kids	
August 6	SuperKitties: The New SuperKitty	Disney Jr.	
August 7	The Day You Begin	PBS Kids	
August 8	She Stole My Son's Heart	Lifetime	
August 13	Camp Rock 3	Disney Channel	
August 14	Whitmer Thomas: Terminal Crew of Dudes	HBO	
August 20	Celebrity Crime Scene: Princess Diana	Fox	
August 20	Disney Worldbuilders	Disney+	
August 22	The Run for a Million	CBS	
August 25	A CBS News Special: Dolly Parton - An American Icon	CBS	
August 25	Dolly Parton: An American Original - Special Edition of 20/20	ABC	
August 26	The Simpsons: Yellow Mirror	Disney+	
August 26	Dolly: An NBC News Special	NBC	
August 29	Much About Love	Hallmark Channel	
August 30	Robot Chicken Adult Swim 25th Anniversary Special	Adult Swim	
August 30	Entertainment Tonight: Remembering Dolly: A Rhinestone Life	CBS	
September 1	9/11: United We Stand – 25 Years Later	ABC	
September 2	LEGO Star Wars: The Mandalorian	Disney+	
September 3	Clash of the Thundermans	Nickelodeon/Paramount+	
September 5	Surviving the Silence: The Roxane Gay Story	Lifetime	
September 5	Haunted Harmony Mysteries: Prelude to a Wedding	Hallmark Channel	
September 11	102 Minutes Inside the Towers	History Channel	
September 11	9/11: We Remember	CBS	
September 11	Daughters of 9/11	CBS	
September 12	Falling Into Place	Hallmark Channel	
September 12	Robin Roberts Presents Angel in the Rubble: The Genelle Guzman Story	Lifetime	
September 13	Best of VMAs: Iconic Vanguard Performances	CBS	
September 15	14 Days in Gainesville	ESPN	
September 19	Sole Survivor of Flight 119	Lifetime	
September 19	Garage Sale Mysteries: Murder Takes the Stage	Hallmark Channel	
September 20	Kimora Lee: On Her Own	Lifetime	
September 20	Best of VMAs: Unforgettable Moments	CBS	
September 22	Judge Judy: Unfiltered, Unforgettable	CBS	
September 22	Siren: The Voices of Shelley Beattie	HBO	
September 24	Spidey and the Avengers: Halloween Team-Up!	Disney Jr.	
September 26	The Ocean Between Them	Lifetime	
September 26	Pumpkin Regatta Romance	Hallmark Channel	
September 29	LEGO One Piece	Netflix	
September 29	Comics Unleashed with Byron Allen 20th Anniversary Special	CBS	
September 29	The Amazing Race: 25 Years Around the World	CBS	
October 3	A Doctor to Die For: The Sarah Harris Story	Lifetime	
October 3	A Knight to Remember	Hallmark Channel	
October 5	Family Guy: Happy Hell-o-ween	Hulu	
October 10	The Spirit of Halloween	Hallmark Channel	
October 10	The Monster She Married	Lifetime	
October 12	The Patrick Star Show: Scary Tales	Nickelodeon	
October 16	'Tis the Season for Setups	Hallmark Channel	
October 16	Kate Berlant: Parmesan	HBO	
October 17	Holiday Touchdown: A Bears Love Story	Hallmark Channel	
October 17	Super Scam Me	Nat Geo	
October 17	Sins of an Amish Husband	Lifetime	
October 18	Mr. & Mrs. Christmas	Hallmark Channel	
October 20	Hot Wheels Let's Race: Attack of the T-Rex	Netflix	
October 21	CMA Presents I Will Always Love You: A Celebration of Dolly Parton	ABC	
October 23	Battle of the Streaming Stars I	The Roku Channel	
October 23	Winter Wonderlanes	Hallmark Channel	
October 24	Forgotten Holiday	Hallmark Channel	
October 24	Secrets of Mercy Hospital	Lifetime	
October 25	What If Christmas	Hallmark Channel	
October 26	The Daily Show Presents: Jordan Klepper Fingers the Pulse: Red Flags	Comedy Central	
October 27	Toxic: What Happened in the Haight House?	Investigation Discovery	
October 29	Ghosts: Halloween 6: The Mirror	CBS	
October 30	Paw Patrol: Ahoy, Dude! A Zuma Pirate Adventure	Nickelodeon	
October 30	Who's Coming for Christmas?	Hallmark Channel	
October 31	Untitled The Kitchen special	Food Network	
October 31	Adopting St. Nick	Hallmark Channel	
November 1	A Danish Christmas	Hallmark Channel	
November 1	Barbie in the Nutcracker	Netflix	
November 6	JonBenét Ramsey: Race Against Time, Who Is 'Unknown Male 1'? – A New Diane Sawyer Investigation	ABC	
November 6	Merry Memories	Hallmark Channel	
November 7	Holiday Unplugged	Hallmark Channel	
November 7	Terry McMillan Presents: Paradise with You	Lifetime	
November 8	A Season of Promises	Hallmark Channel	
November 10	We Chose to Go to the Moon	PBS	
November 11	Forged by War: The Navy SEALs	History Channel	
November 11	Mission to Honor: A 250th Salute to American Veterans	History Channel	
November 13	Expedition: Saving Our Seas	Nat Geo	
November 13	My Christmas Cowboy	Hallmark Channel	
November 13	Snoopy Presents: 12 Days of Snoopy	Apple TV	
November 14	One Last Shot	Lifetime	
November 14	The Nights Before Christmas	Hallmark Channel	
November 14	A Proud Family Wizmas	Disney+	
November 15	Mistletoe and Mimosas	Hallmark Channel	
November 16	Carnival of the Animals	PBS Kids	
November 17	Darius, Dolly and 60 Years of Celebration: Countdown to the CMAs with Robin Roberts	ABC	
November 18	The Hotline	HBO	
November 19	The Mad Pooper	TLC	
November 20	Our Holiday Playbook	Hallmark Channel	
November 21	Christmas in Blue Dog Valley	Hallmark Channel	
November 21	Love On The Vineyard	Lifetime	
November 22	Double Booked for the Holidays	Hallmark Channel	
November 23	Pillsbury Bake-Off Classic	CBS/Paramount+	
November 25	The Slightest Touch	HBO	
November 26	Mickey's Home Alone	Disney Jr.	
November 26	The JLO Show: Live in Las Vegas	CBS/Paramount+	
November 26	The Crossbow Cannibal	All Reality	
November 26	Christmas Delivered	Hallmark Channel	
November 27	SpongeBob SquarePants: Merry Christmas, Mr. Plankton	Nickelodeon/Paramount+	
November 27	You Can Go Home Again	BET	
November 27	The Christmas Eve Feast	Hallmark Channel	
November 27	Return to Santa	Hallmark Channel	
November 28	The Most Wonderful Secret	Hallmark Channel	
November 28	Holiday Ever After: A Disney World Wish Come True	Hallmark Channel	
November 28	The Christmas Showdown 2	OWN	
November 29	Eight Nights for Love	Hallmark Channel	
November 29	Miles to Christmas	Hallmark Channel	
November 30	Family Guy: The Peter Clause	Hulu	
December 1	Seized	HBO	
December 2	Christmas With Snoop	NBC	
December 4	Fraggle Rock: A Holiday Gift	Apple TV	
December 4	Love After Lockup: Home for the Holidays	All Reality/We TV	
December 4	The Snowflake Effect	Hallmark Channel	
December 5	A Grand Biltmore Christmas	Hallmark Channel	
December 5	Tapping Into Christmas	OWN	
December 6	An Angel in My Stocking	Hallmark Channel	
December 8	Alan Jackson: The Last Show	NBC	
December 10	Died Hard: A Ghosts Christmas Special	CBS	
December 10	NBC100: The Live Celebration	NBC/Peacock	
December 11	Christmas in Canterbury	Hallmark Channel	
December 12	Snow Globe Town	Hallmark Channel	
December 13	Noelle Nomads	Hallmark Channel	
December 13	The Price Is Right: Live Holiday Special	CBS	
December 14	The Chosen: The Three Kings	Fox	
December 15	The Price Is Right: 20 Seasons of Drew Carey	CBS	
December 16	World's Funniest Moments: Christmas	The CW	
December 17	The Light of Christmas with the Tabernacle Choir	The CW	
December 17	Entertainment Tonight: I Love Lucy: 75 Years of Laughter	CBS	
December 18	Hearts All Aglow	Hallmark Channel	
December 19	Barking All the Way	Hallmark Channel	
December 20	Save the Date for Christmas	Hallmark Channel	
December 28	Popstar! Best of 2026	The CW	
December	Gary Gulman: Grandiloquent	HBO	
TBA	Untitled Paw Patrol special	Nickelodeon	
TBA	Christmas Everyday Again	Lifetime	

=== Milestone episodes and anniversaries ===
Show	Network	Episode #	Episode title	Episode airdate	Source
Spidey and His Amazing Friends	Disney Jr.	100th episode	"A Helping Handful/Adventures Down the Drain"	January 9	
Saturday Night Live	NBC	1,000th episode	"Alexander Skarsgård/Cardi B"	January 31	
The Muppet Show	ABC/Disney+	50th anniversary	"Sabrina Carpenter with Seth Rogen"	February 4	
Family Guy	Fox	450th episode	"Bringing Up Brady" (Note: "The Edible Arrangement", which aired on February 15 two weeks earlier, was publicized as the 450th episode.)	March 1	
The Loud House	Nickelodeon	200th episode	"Hologram Jam"	March 6	
The Loud House	Nickelodeon	200th episode	"Sick as a Dad"	April 24	
PAW Patrol	Nickelodeon	300th episode	"Pups Solve a Snap-N-Wrap Problem"	March 9	
PAW Patrol	Nickelodeon	300th episode	"Pups Save Helga and the Dingers"	March 10	
Hannah Montana	Disney+	20th anniversary	Hannah Montana 20th Anniversary Special	March 24	
NCIS	CBS	500th episode	"All Good Things"	March 24	
Bar Rescue	Paramount Network	300th episode	"Hair of the Big Dog"	April 26	
Outlander	Starz	100th episode	"Pharos"	May 8	
Snapped	Oxygen	700th episode	"Jacqueline Johnson-Cabrera"	July 26	
Teen Titans Go!	Cartoon Network	450th episode	"TV Knight 10"	August 1	
Big Brother	CBS	1,000th episode	"Episode 25"	August 27	
American Dad!	Fox	400th episode	"400?!"	September 13	
Comics Unleashed	CBS	20th anniversary	Comics Unleashed with Byron Allen 20th Anniversary Special	September 29	
Pardon the Interruption	ESPN	25th anniversary	TBD	October 22	
Chicago Fire	NBC	300th episode	"Three Hundred"	November 4	
Batwheels	HBO Max	100th episode	"Rearview Window"	November 6	
Law & Order: Special Victims Unit	NBC	600th episode	"Obedience"	November 12	
Abbott Elementary	ABC	100th episode	"One Hundred"	December 2	

=== Shows returning in 2026 ===
Show	Last aired	Type of return	Previous channel	New/returning/same channel	Return date	Source
Alaska State Troopers	2015	Revival	Nat Geo	A&E	January 7	
My Strange Addiction	2015	New season	TLC	same	January 7	
Primal	2022	New season	Adult Swim	same	January 11	
The Night Manager	2016	Revival	AMC	Amazon Prime Video	January 11	
Fear Factor (as Fear Factor: House of Fear)	2018	Revival	MTV	Fox	January 11	
Star Search	2004	Reboot	CBS	Netflix	January 20	
Scrubs	2010	Revival	ABC	same	February 25	
Ladies of London (as Ladies of London: The New Reign)	2017	Revival	Bravo	same	March 5	
Jury Duty	2023	New season	Amazon Freevee	Amazon Prime Video	March 20	
The Comeback	2014	New season	HBO	same	March 22	
Malcolm in the Middle (as Malcolm in the Middle: Life's Still Unfair)	2006	Revival	Fox	Hulu	April 10	
Euphoria	2022	New season	HBO	same	April 12	
Beef	2023	New season	Netflix	same	April 16	
American Gladiators	2008	Reboot	NBC	Amazon Prime Video	April 17	
Running Wild with Bear Grylls (as Bear Grylls Is Running Wild)	2023	New season	Nat Geo	Fox	April 21	
The Terror (as The Terror: Devil in Silver)	2019	New season	AMC	AMC+/Shudder	May 7	
Regular Show (as Regular Show: The Lost Tapes)	2017	Revival	Cartoon Network	same	May 11	
Everyone Is Doing Great	2021	New season	Hulu	Netflix	May 11	
WNBA on NBC	2002	Revival	NBC	same	May 17	
House of the Dragon	2024	New season	HBO	same	June 21	
Adventure Time (as Adventure Time: Side Quests)	2018	Reboot	Cartoon Network	Hulu	June 29	
Restaurant: Impossible (as Restaurant Impossible: Last Call)	2023	Reboot	Food Network	same	July 23	
Ted Lasso	2023	New season	Apple TV	same	August 5	
NFL Total Access	2024	Revival	NFL Network	same	September 8	
A Different World	1993	Revival	NBC	Netflix	September 24	
Untold Stories of the E.R.	2020	Revival	Discovery Life	TLC	October 14	
Deadly Women (as Deadly Women 2.0)	2021	Reboot	Investigation Discovery	same	November 10	
The Circle	2024	Reboot	Netflix	Hulu	November 17	
P-Valley	2022	New season	Starz	same	December 4	
Man v. Food (as Men v. Food)	2022	Reboot	Cooking Channel	Discovery Channel	December 8	
Later Daters	2024	New season	Netflix	same	December 30	
Rescue 911	1996	Revival	CBS	Discovery Channel	Late	

=== Shows ending in 2026 ===
End date	Show	Channel	First aired	Status	Source
January 11	PBS News Weekend	PBS	2013	Canceled	
January 14	Palm Royale	Apple TV	2024	Canceled	
January 15	The Upshaws	Netflix	2021	Ended	
January 15	Ponies	Peacock	2026	Canceled	
January 16	Banfield	NewsNation	2021	Ended	
January 16	Power Book IV: Force	Starz	2022	Ended	
January 21	Queer Eye	Netflix	2018	Ended	
January 27	Wonder Man	Disney+	2026	Canceled	
February 6	Spartacus: House of Ashur	Starz	2025	Canceled	
February 17	Tell Me Lies	Hulu	2022	Ended	
February 20	Strip Law	Netflix	2026	Canceled	
March 5	Ted	Peacock	2024	Canceled	
March 8	It's Not Like That	Amazon Prime Video	2026	Canceled	
March 13	Stumble	NBC	2025	Canceled	
March 25	Heartbreak High	Netflix	2022	Ended	
March 26	Love Overboard	Hulu	2026	Canceled	
April 12	Smiling Friends	Adult Swim	2022	Ended	
April 19	Skillsville	PBS Kids	2025	Canceled	
April 20	Kevin	Amazon Prime Video	2026	Canceled	
April 23	The Gilgo Beach Killer: House of Secrets	Peacock	2025	Ended	
April 23	Going Dutch	Fox	2025	Canceled	
April 30	Ladies of London	Bravo	2014	Canceled	
May 1	Early Start with Rahel Solomon	CNN	2025	Canceled	
May 3	Watson	CBS	2025	Canceled	
May 7	The Hunting Party	NBC	2025	Canceled	
May 7	M.I.A.	Peacock	2026	Canceled	
May 10	The Comeback	HBO	2005	Ended	
May 11	The Neighborhood	CBS	2018	Ended	
May 11	DMV	CBS	2025	Canceled	
May 13	Good Omens	Amazon Prime Video	2019	Ended	
May 15	Outlander	Starz	2014	Ended	
May 19	Love & Hip Hop: Atlanta	MTV	2012	Ended	
May 20	The Boys	Amazon Prime Video	2019	Ended	
May 21	The Late Show with Stephen Colbert	CBS	2015	Canceled	
May 21	Sherri	Syndication	2022	Canceled	
May 21	The Boroughs	Netflix	2026	Canceled	
May 22	The Yogurt Shop Murders	HBO	2025	Ended	
May 26	Karamo	Syndication	2022	Canceled	
May 27	Spider-Noir	Amazon Prime Video	2026	Canceled	
May 28	Hacks	HBO Max	2021	Ended	
May 28	Deli Boys	Hulu	2025	Canceled	
May 31	Euphoria	HBO	2019	Ended	
June 11	Sweet Magnolias	Netflix	2020	Canceled	
June 14	Rugrats	Nickelodeon Global	2021	Ended	
June 21	The Way Home	Hallmark Channel	2023	Ended	
June 23	Not Suitable for Work	Hulu	2026	Canceled	
June 24	Love & Hip Hop: Miami	BET	2018	Canceled	
June 25	The Bear	FX on Hulu	2022	Ended	
July 1	Brilliant Minds	NBC	2024	Canceled	
July 2	Survival of the Thickest	Netflix	2023	Ended	
July 15	Ride or Die	Amazon Prime Video	2026	Canceled	
July 23	Ransom Canyon	Netflix	2025	Canceled	
July 26	The Chi	Showtime	2018	Ended	
July 29	The Proud Family: Louder and Prouder	Disney+	2022	Ended	
August 4	Wizards Beyond Waverly Place	Disney Channel	2024	Ended	
August 7	Power Book III: Raising Kanan	Starz	2021	Ended	
August 20	Outer Banks	Netflix	2020	Ended	
August 31	The Kelly Clarkson Show	Syndication	2019	Ended	
September 3	Jersey Shore: Family Vacation	MTV	2018	Ended	
September 6	MS NOW Reports	MS NOW	1996	Canceled	
September 6	Alex Witt Reports	MS NOW	2011	Canceled	
September 10	Access Daily with Mario & Kit	Syndication	2010	Canceled	
September 11	Access Hollywood	Syndication	1996	Canceled	
September 28	All American	The CW	2018	Ended	
October 7	The Steve Wilkos Show	Syndication	2007	Canceled	
October 12	Rock Paper Scissors	Nickelodeon	2024	Canceled	
October 14	The Oval	BET	2019	Ended	
October 22	Judy Justice	Amazon Prime Video	2021	Ended	
November 11	Stay Tuned	NBC News Now	2023	Canceled	
December 2	All the Queen's Men	Paramount+	2021	Ending	
December 24	Emily in Paris	Netflix	2020	Ending	
Late	Amanpour	CNN International	2009	Ending	
Late	Amanpour & Company	PBS	2018	Ending	
TBA	Ridiculousness	MTV	2011	Canceled	
TBA	House of David	Amazon Prime Video	2025	Ending	

Notes:

- On July 17, 2025, Stephen Colbert announced on The Late Show that the show would be ending in May 2026, which received some controversy. Although some sources and CBS claim that the network ended the show for financial reasons, other sources claim that the show was canceled for political reasons due to Colbert's comments regarding the second Trump administration as well as Paramount's settlement with Donald Trump's lawsuit regarding Kamala Harris' October 2024 60 Minutes interview (which also came as the Paramount-Skydance merger still awaited to be closed), with Colbert's comments occurring just three days before his announcement of the show's cancellation.

=== Entering syndication in 2026 ===
A list of programs (current or canceled) that have accumulated enough episodes (typically between 65 and 100) or seasons (three or more) to be eligible for off-network syndication or basic cable runs.

Show	Seasons	In production	Notes	Source
America's Funniest Home Videos	36	Yes	Broadcast syndication in local markets of Alfonso Ribeiro's hosting run	
Police 24/7	2	Yes		
Scrabble	2	Yes	First season excluded	
Trivial Pursuit	2	Yes		

== Networks and services ==
=== Launches ===
Network	Type	Launch date	Notes	Sources
Scripps Sports Network	FAST	March 24	On March 24, the E. W. Scripps Company announced the launch of its free streaming network Scripps Sports Network, which relies on content that Scripps has acquired for Ion Television and its local stations, including the Professional Women's Hockey League, National Women's Soccer League, Major League Volleyball, and replays of the Women's National Basketball Association, along with the National Arena League.	
Hasbro Legends	FAST, over-the-air multicast	July 13	On April 13, Get After It Media announced a deal with Hasbro to launch a new channel based on the company's television properties, including content that was produced under license from Hasbro for the syndication market and for its previous linear offering, the Hub Network, which was rebranded as Discovery Family in October 2014, and Hasbro had since divested. To fill in open slot for the network among its suite of networks, GAI merged the programming of automotive channel Rev'n and the Action Channel into one feed, rebranded as Rev'n Action.	

=== Conversions and rebrandings ===
Old network name	New network name	Type	Conversion date	Notes	Source
Motor Trend	Discovery Turbo	Cable/satellite	January 9	Following the December 2024 sale of Motor Trend Group to Hearst Magazines, Warner Bros. Discovery quietly renamed the Motor Trend television network Discovery Turbo, a brand otherwise used in international markets.	
Get	Great Entertainment Television	Over-the-air television network	February 16	Without fanfare, the Sony Pictures Television-owned digital network quietly removes the GET acronym in favor of the full name "Great Entertainment Television." The network was called getTV from its 2014 launch until rebranding to GET in 2023.	

=== Closures ===
Network/ service	Type	End date	Notes	Source
Root Sports Northwest	Regional sports network	January 1	On September 26, 2025, days before the end of the Mariners' regular season, the team announced that Root Sports would close, with MLB Local Media serving as the team's distribution rights starting in 2026.	
Fave TV	Over-the-air television network	February 2	Fave TV, which launched as an exclusive subchannel for CBS-owned stations in December 2020, quietly shut down on this date as a result of CBS agreeing to carry either Outlaw or 365BLK (both owned by Free TV Networks) on several of its owned stations. Although no public announcement confirmed the closure, the network's website stated that no programming would air after 6AM ET.	
Merit TV	Over-the-air television network	March 21	The digital multicast network owned by Phil McGraw quietly closed on or around this date without any notice, as a result of a court order to convert the company to Chapter 7 liquidation in October 2025, with McGraw moving his focus on a new channel, Envoy TV in mid-2025, and former production/distribution partner Trinity Broadcasting Network contractually maintained a feed of previously-recorded programming until the agreement's ultimate termination. TBN-owned stations that previously carried Merit replaced it with a mostly unbranded infomercial channel known as TV Deals (similar to the ministry's prior replacement of its in-house children's network, Smile, with OnTV4U after Smile's closure in January 2025).	
BET+	Over-the-top streaming service	July 22	On March 13, Paramount Skydance announced that they had acquired Tyler Perry Studios' stake in BET+, and would shut down the service and merge its programming into Paramount+.	
Victory+	Over-the-top streaming service	September 1	Launched in 2024 with the NHL's Dallas Stars as its first rights deal (the team was a part-owner in the venture), Victory+ was a FAST service that carried several local-level pro and high school teams. The service would encounter financial and funding difficulties, missed payments to teams and leagues (notably to the Anaheim Ducks, Texas Rangers, and National Women's Soccer League) and subsequent termination of rights deals. The Dallas Morning News reported that Victory+ dissolved on September 1, with Sports Business Journal later reporting that the service had terminated its staff one day earlier. A Parent Media Company, Victory+'s Alberta-based parent, would be placed into receivership on September 4 at the request of its primary lender.	
FanDuel Sports Network	Regional sports networks	September 30	On February 1, Main Street Sports Group informed the teams to which it held rights that it had begun the process of shutting down the remaining regional sports networks in its portfolio, with Sports Business Journal reporting on April 2 that Main Street's lenders signed to a closure plan that would begin with the end of the NBA's regular season on April 12 and last through April 30, the day of the last game in the first round NHL's Stanley Cup Playoffs that featured a team to which the network held rights, in order to fulfill the remaining contracts Main Street held with those leagues' teams. The closure of the channels ended a regional sports service that was originally established as Prime Sports in 1989; rebranded to Fox Sports Networks in 1996 (subsequently acquiring the assets of SportsChannel and three independent networks); and, after Main Street was formed in 2019, as the Sinclair/Allen Media joint venture Diamond Sports Group (the result of regulators requiring ESPN owner The Walt Disney Company to sell FSN during its acquisition of 21st Century Fox), rebranded through promotional partnerships to Bally Sports in 2021, and to FanDuel Sports Network in 2024. In recent years, Main Street encountered financial difficulties operating the channels due to cable subscription revenue declines (compounded by carriage disputes under Sinclair/Allen ownership, with the Bally/FanDuel networks losing their linear streaming pay television distribution), resulting in bankruptcies, missed rights payments, and the termination of team broadcast contracts (most notably the termination of FanDuel Sports' relationships with nine Major League Baseball teams on January 8). With no live sports programs remaining, Xfinity removed the channels on May 7. The channel fully closed on September 30, two days after its removal from DirecTV. One of the channels remains operational: its first channel, the Los Angeles-based Prime Ticket (FDSN West at the time of the closure), came under the ownership of the Los Angeles Angels and became Angels Broadcast Television (ABTV).	
News 12+	Cable and satellite	December 27	In October 2026, Optimum Communications, the owner of News 12 Networks, announced that it would discontinue the operations of News 12+ at the end of the year due to the owner’s financial problems. The sister channel to the main News 12 networks launched as part of the MSG Metro Channels package in August 1998 and provided round-the-clock traffic and weather information in areas which were served by News 12.	

== Television stations ==
=== Subchannel launches ===
Date	Market	Station	Channel	Affiliation	Notes	Source
February 5	Pocatello–Idaho Falls, Idaho	KPIF	15.13	Newsmax2		
February 26	Tulsa, Oklahoma	KOKI-TV	23.4	Charge!	Sinclair Broadcast Group, which owns KTUL, began operating KOKI on this date, and three subchannels launched on the station.	
February 26	Tulsa, Oklahoma	KOKI-TV	23.5	Comet	Sinclair Broadcast Group, which owns KTUL, began operating KOKI on this date, and three subchannels launched on the station.	
February 26	Tulsa, Oklahoma	KOKI-TV	23.6	The Nest	Sinclair Broadcast Group, which owns KTUL, began operating KOKI on this date, and three subchannels launched on the station.	
April 1	New York City, New York	WNET	13.3	World Channel	As part of WNET's sister station, WLIW, adding NHK World-Japan, the station moved the World Channel from WLIW to a new subchannel of WNET.	
August 1	Albuquerque, New Mexico	KOAT-TV	7.4	CBS	See CBS entry on "Stations changing network affiliations"	
August 1	Birmingham, Alabama	WVTM-TV	13.4	CBS	See CBS entry on "Stations changing network affiliations"	
August 1	Greenville, South Carolina	WYFF	4.3	CBS	See CBS entry on "Stations changing network affiliations"	
August 1	Jackson, Mississippi	WAPT	16.4	CBS	See CBS entry on "Stations changing network affiliations"	
September 1	Nashville, Tennessee	WTVF	5.4	Ion Plus		
September 1	St. Louis, Missouri	KMOV	32.2	MyNetworkTV		
September 4	Rochester, New York	WBGT-CD	46.8	Jewelry TV		
November 1	Fort Walton Beach–Pensacola, Florida; Mobile, Alabama	WPAN	53.5	Blab TV	See WPAN entry on "Stations changing network affiliations"	
November 1	Fort Walton Beach–Pensacola, Florida; Mobile, Alabama	WPAN	53.6	PBS Kids	See WPAN entry on "Stations changing network affiliations"	

=== Stations changing network affiliations ===
Date	Market	Station	Channel	Prior affiliation	New affiliation	Notes	Source
February 5	Idaho Falls–Pocatello, Idaho	KIDK	3.1	Dabl	MeTV		
February 5	Idaho Falls–Pocatello, Idaho	KXPI-LD	3.1	Dabl	MeTV		
March 2	Tulsa, Oklahoma	KOKI-TV	23.1	Fox	Roar	On February 6, it was announced that Sinclair Broadcast Group (which owned local ABC affiliate KTUL) acquired the Fox affiliation, owned by Rincon Broadcasting Group. On February 9, KOKI's main Fox affiliation moved to KTUL-DT2, with a simulcast on 23.1 continuing until March 1, when KOKI's main station switched to Roar.	
March 19	San Diego, California	KUSI-TV	51.1	Independent	The CW	On that date, Nexstar Media Group completed its acquisition of Tegna Inc., owner of KFMB-TV. After the sale, some of The CW's programming had started to air and later move to KUSI-TV. KUSI became a sole CW outlet on March 23, when KFMB-DT2 ended its nearly nine-year affiliation with the network.	
March 31	New York City, New York	WASA-LD	24.1	Estrella TV	Hot 97 TV	On March 30, MediaCo announced that WASA-LD would remove Estrella TV in favor of the company's network Hot 97 TV, a free ad-supported streaming television (FAST) channel produced by New York City sister urban contemporary radio station WQHT that features programming on hip-hop music and culture. This made WASA-LD the second television station in the United States overall to affiliate with Hot 97 TV; the first was CNZ Communications-owned WHOT-TV in Atlanta.	
April 1	Pendleton, Oregon; Pasco–Richland–Kennewick, Washington	KFFX-TV	11.1	Fox	Roar	Sinclair and Rincon entered into a joint sales agreement involving KEPR-TV, KFFX, and KYCU in February 2026. As part of the agreement, the entire schedules of KFFX and KYCU would be moved to a digital subchannel of KEPR-TV.	
April 1	Yakima, Washington	KCYU-LD	41.1	Fox	Roar	Sinclair and Rincon entered into a joint sales agreement involving KEPR-TV, KFFX, and KYCU in February 2026. As part of the agreement, the entire schedules of KFFX and KYCU would be moved to a digital subchannel of KEPR-TV.	
June 29	Franklin–Nashville, Tennessee	WNPX-TV	28.1	Ion Television	Independent	WNPX returned to independence for the first time since 1995, and adopted "The Spot" identity used on other Scripps-owned independents, in preparation to becoming the new television home of the NHL's Nashville Predators.	
July 1	Vincennes, Indiana	WVUT	22.1	PBS	Educational independent	On April 4, 2026, Vincennes University announced that WVUT would end its PBS membership on June 30, 2026, following a review of operations and sustainability prompted by the 2025 end of federal public broadcasting funding.	
July 1	Pensacola, Florida	WSRE	23.1	PBS	Educational independent	WSRE disaffiliated from PBS after a board decision by the Pensacola State College trustees in September 2025, due to cuts in state and federal funding to public media.	
August 1	Birmingham, Alabama	WIAT	42.1	CBS	Independent	In July 2026, Nexstar renewed the majority of its affiliation contracts with CBS, but was unable to reach an agreement in six markets. Forum Communications Company and Hearst Television reached affiliation agreements with the network which featured a gain in carriage on their stations' digital subchannels in those areas.	
August 1	Greenville, South Carolina/Asheville, North Carolina	WYCW	62.1	The CW	Independent	In July 2026, Nexstar renewed the majority of its affiliation contracts with CBS, but was unable to reach an agreement in six markets. Forum Communications Company and Hearst Television reached affiliation agreements with the network which featured a gain in carriage on their stations' digital subchannels in those areas.	
August 1	Greenville, South Carolina/Asheville, North Carolina	WSPA-TV	7.1	CBS	The CW	In July 2026, Nexstar renewed the majority of its affiliation contracts with CBS, but was unable to reach an agreement in six markets. Forum Communications Company and Hearst Television reached affiliation agreements with the network which featured a gain in carriage on their stations' digital subchannels in those areas.	
August 1	Jackson, Mississippi	WJTV	12.1	CBS	The CW	In July 2026, Nexstar renewed the majority of its affiliation contracts with CBS, but was unable to reach an agreement in six markets. Forum Communications Company and Hearst Television reached affiliation agreements with the network which featured a gain in carriage on their stations' digital subchannels in those areas.	
August 1	Albuquerque, New Mexico	KRQE	13.1	CBS	Fox	In July 2026, Nexstar renewed the majority of its affiliation contracts with CBS, but was unable to reach an agreement in six markets. Forum Communications Company and Hearst Television reached affiliation agreements with the network which featured a gain in carriage on their stations' digital subchannels in those areas.	
August 1	Roswell, New Mexico	KBIM-TV	10.1	CBS	Fox	In July 2026, Nexstar renewed the majority of its affiliation contracts with CBS, but was unable to reach an agreement in six markets. Forum Communications Company and Hearst Television reached affiliation agreements with the network which featured a gain in carriage on their stations' digital subchannels in those areas.	
August 1	Durango, Colorado	KREZ-TV	6.1	CBS	Fox	In July 2026, Nexstar renewed the majority of its affiliation contracts with CBS, but was unable to reach an agreement in six markets. Forum Communications Company and Hearst Television reached affiliation agreements with the network which featured a gain in carriage on their stations' digital subchannels in those areas.	
August 1	Bismarck, North Dakota	KXMB-TV	12.1	CBS	The CW	In July 2026, Nexstar renewed the majority of its affiliation contracts with CBS, but was unable to reach an agreement in six markets. Forum Communications Company and Hearst Television reached affiliation agreements with the network which featured a gain in carriage on their stations' digital subchannels in those areas.	
August 1	Rapid City, South Dakota	KCLO-TV	15.1	CBS	The CW	In July 2026, Nexstar renewed the majority of its affiliation contracts with CBS, but was unable to reach an agreement in six markets. Forum Communications Company and Hearst Television reached affiliation agreements with the network which featured a gain in carriage on their stations' digital subchannels in those areas.	
September 1	Bessemer, Alabama	WDBB	17.1	The CW	Independent	In July 2026, Nexstar renewed the majority of its affiliation contracts with CBS, but was unable to reach an agreement in six markets. Forum Communications Company and Hearst Television reached affiliation agreements with the network which featured a gain in carriage on their stations' digital subchannels in those areas.	
September 1	Birmingham, Alabama	WTTO	21.1	The CW	Independent	In July 2026, Nexstar renewed the majority of its affiliation contracts with CBS, but was unable to reach an agreement in six markets. Forum Communications Company and Hearst Television reached affiliation agreements with the network which featured a gain in carriage on their stations' digital subchannels in those areas.	
September 1	Birmingham, Alabama	WIAT	42.1	Independent	The CW	In July 2026, Nexstar renewed the majority of its affiliation contracts with CBS, but was unable to reach an agreement in six markets. Forum Communications Company and Hearst Television reached affiliation agreements with the network which featured a gain in carriage on their stations' digital subchannels in those areas.	
September 1	St. Louis, Missouri	KDNL-TV	30.1	ABC	Independent	KDNL, which had served as the market's ABC affiliate from August 1995, disaffilied with the network as it moved to a digital subchannel of KMOV. Outside of ABC network newscasts and syndicated news programming provided by Sinclair, the station had not aired traditional news programming since the closure of its local news operation in October 2001.	
September 1	Harlingen–McAllen–Brownsville, Texas	KGBT-TV	4.1	MyNetworkTV	The CW Plus	In August 2026, it was reported that KGBT would become a CW affiliation, effective September 1, moving MyNetworkTV to the 4.2 subchannel.	
November 1	Fort Walton Beach–Pensacola, Florida; Mobile, Alabama	WPAN	53.1	Blab TV	PBS	On October 2, 2026, it was announced that WPAN would become a new PBS member station for the Pensacola area effective November 1 under the name Emerald Coast PBS. This marks Pensacola regaining a PBS member station after WSRE ended its PBS member station status on July 1.	

=== Subchannels changing network affiliations ===
Date	Market	Station	Channel	Prior affiliation	New affiliation	Notes	Source
January 26	Seattle–Tacoma, Washington	KSTW	11.3	Fave TV	Outlaw	See Fave TV entry on "Closures"	
January 29	Atlanta, Georgia	WUPA	69.5	Fave TV	365BLK	See Fave TV entry on "Closures"	
January 29	Dallas–Fort Worth, Texas	KTVT	11.4	Fave TV	Outlaw	See Fave TV entry on "Closures"	
January 29	St. Petersburg–Tampa, Florida	WTOG	44.3	Fave TV	Outlaw	See Fave TV entry on "Closures"	
February 2	Baltimore, Maryland	WJZ-TV	13.4	Fave TV	365BLK	See Fave TV entry on "Closures"	
February 2	Boston, Massachusetts	WBZ-TV	4.4	Fave TV	Outlaw	See Fave TV entry on "Closures"	
February 2	Chicago, Illinois	WBBM-TV	2.4	Fave TV	365BLK	See Fave TV entry on "Closures"	
February 2	Detroit, Michigan	WWJ-TV	62.4	Fave TV	365BLK	See Fave TV entry on "Closures"	
February 2	Los Angeles, California	KCBS-TV	2.4	Fave TV	365BLK	See Fave TV entry on "Closures"	
February 2	Miami, Florida	WFOR-TV	4.4	Fave TV	Outlaw	See Fave TV entry on "Closures"	
February 2	Minneapolis–Saint Paul, Minnesota	WCCO-TV	4.4	Fave TV	Outlaw	See Fave TV entry on "Closures"	
February 2	New York City, New York	WCBS-TV	2.4	Fave TV	365BLK	See Fave TV entry on "Closures"	
February 2	Philadelphia, Pennsylvania	WPSG	57.5	Fave TV	365BLK	See Fave TV entry on "Closures"	
February 2	Pittsburgh, Pennsylvania	KDKA-TV	2.4	Fave TV	365BLK	See Fave TV entry on "Closures"	
February 2	Sacramento–Stockton, California	KOVR	13.4	Fave TV	Outlaw	See Fave TV entry on "Closures"	
February 2	San Francisco, California	KPIX-TV	5.4	Fave TV	365BLK	See Fave TV entry on "Closures"	
February 2	Sacramento–Stockton–Modesto, California	KVIE	6.3	World Channel (full-time)	Create / World Channel (both part-time)		
February 5	Pocatello–Idaho Falls, Idaho	KPIF	15.4	MeTV	WEST		
February 5	Pocatello–Idaho Falls, Idaho	KPIF	15.9	Antenna TV	Jewelry Television		
February 5	Pocatello–Idaho Falls, Idaho	KPIF	15.12	Newsmax2	Ace TV		
February 5	Pocatello–Idaho Falls, Idaho	KVUI	31.11	RVTV	Antenna TV		
February 5	Pocatello–Idaho Falls, Idaho	KVUI	31.13	Ventana TV	Shop LC		
February 9	Tulsa, Oklahoma	KTUL	8.2	Charge!	Fox	See KOKI-TV entry on "Stations changing network affiliations"	
February 9	Tulsa, Oklahoma	KTUL	8.4	Roar	Rewind TV	See KOKI-TV entry on "Stations changing network affiliations"	
February 9	Tulsa, Oklahoma	KTUL	8.5	Comet	—N/a	See KOKI-TV entry on "Stations changing network affiliations"	
February 9	Tulsa, Oklahoma	KTUL	8.6	The Nest	—N/a	See KOKI-TV entry on "Stations changing network affiliations"	
February 9	Tulsa, Oklahoma	KTUL	8.7	Rewind TV	—N/a	See KOKI-TV entry on "Stations changing network affiliations"	
March 23	San Diego, California	KFMB-TV	8.2	The CW (primary); MyNetworkTV (secondary)	MyNetworkTV (sole primary)	See KUSI-TV entry on "Stations changing network affiliations"	
April 1	New York City, New York	WLIW	21.3	World Channel	NHK World	Originally on NJ PBS, NHK World moved to WLIW. Most viewers of NJ PBS in Southern and parts of Central New Jersey, including in the Philadelphia area, could no longer access NHK World by over-the-air television, requiring viewers to watch it via the internet.	
April 1	Yakima, Washington	KIMA-TV	29.3	Roar	Fox	See KFFX-TV and KCYU-LD entries on "Stations changing network affiliations"	
April 1	Pasco–Richland–Kennewick, Washington	KEPR-TV	19.3	Roar	Fox	See KFFX-TV and KCYU-LD entries on "Stations changing network affiliations"	
June 29	Nashville, Tennessee	WTVF	5.2	Independent	Ion Television	See WNPX-TV entry on "Stations changing network affiliations"	
August 1	Albuquerque, New Mexico	KRQE	13.2	Fox	Independent	See CBS entry in "Stations changing network affiliations"	
August 1	Roswell, New Mexico	KBIM-TV	10.2	Fox	Independent	See CBS entry in "Stations changing network affiliations"	
August 1	Durango, Colorado	KREZ-TV	6.2	Fox	Independent	See CBS entry in "Stations changing network affiliations"	
August 1	Bismarck, North Dakota	KXMB-TV	12.2	The CW Plus	Antenna TV	See CBS entry in "Stations changing network affiliations"	
August 1	Bismarck, North Dakota	KBMY	17.2	True Crime Network	CBS	See CBS entry in "Stations changing network affiliations"	
August 1	Rapid City, South Dakota	KNBN	21.2	MyNetworkTV	CBS	See CBS entry in "Stations changing network affiliations"	
August 1	Rapid City, South Dakota	KCLO-TV	15.2	The CW Plus	Independent	See CBS entry in "Stations changing network affiliations"	
September 1	St. Louis, Missouri	KMOV	32.1	MyNetworkTV	ABC	See KDNL entry in "Stations changing network affiliations"	
September 1	Nashville, Tennessee	WNPX-TV	28.5	Ion Plus	Outlaw		
September 1	West Palm Beach, Florida	WPXP-TV	67.7	HSN2	QVC 365		
September 1	New Orleans, Louisiana	WPXL-TV	49.8	HSN2	QVC 365		
September 1	Dallas–Fort Worth, Texas	KPXD-TV	68.7	HSN2	QVC 365		
September 1	Salt Lake City, Utah	KUPX-TV	16.9	HSN2	QVC 365		
September 1	Peoria–Bloomington–Normal, Illinois	WMBD-TV	31.3	Laff	Grit		
September 1	Harlingen–McAllen–Brownsville, Texas	KGBT-TV	4.2	Rewind TV	MyNetworkTV	See KGBT-TV entry on "Stations changing network affiliations"	
September 1	Harlingen–McAllen–Brownsville, Texas	KGBT-TV	4.4	Estrella TV	Antenna TV		
September 4	Tulsa, Oklahoma	KGEB	53.2	Shop LC	Jewelry TV		

=== Station closures ===
Date	Station	Channel	Affiliation	Market	Notes	Source
May 15	WEIU-TV	51.1	Educational independent	Charleston, Illinois	On April 26, 2026, the station announced that they were shutting down the broadcast station effective May 15, 2026, due to budget cuts and the station's disaffiliation with PBS in September 2025. Some of the station's programming continues online after that date.	
