= Michael Jackson: The Verdict =

2026 American documentary series

- Release poster
- Genre: Documentary
- Showrunner: David Herman
- Directed by: Nick Green
- Country of origin: United States
- Original language: English
- No. of episodes: 3

Production
- Executive producers: Fiona Stourton; James Goldston; David Herman
- Producer: Fiona Stourton
- Running time: 157 minutes
- Production company: Candle True Stories

Original release
- Network: Netflix
- Release: June 3, 2026

Michael Jackson: The Verdict is a 2026 American documentary series directed by Nick Green and produced by Candle True Stories. It revisits the 2005 criminal trial of the American singer Michael Jackson. The documentary premiered on Netflix on June 3, 2026.

== Summary ==
The series examines the 2005 trial of Michael Jackson, an event that drew massive attention from both the media and the public. It includes interviews with jurors, eyewitnesses, journalists who covered the proceedings, and individuals connected to both the prosecution and defense, while incorporating archival footage to reconstruct the events of the trial and its aftermath. The docuseries tracks the case over its 12-week run, which concluded with Jackson's acquittal on all charges.

Each interviewee provides their perspective on the evidence, witness statements, and closing arguments, as well as their personal views on the verdict. The series also explores the enduring public interest in the trial and the ongoing debate surrounding Jackson's legacy.

== Cast ==
=== Legal team ===
- Ron Zonen — prosecutor
- Mark Geragos — defense attorney
- Brian Oxman — Michael Jackson family attorney

=== Media ===
- Martin Bashir — journalist
- Diane Dimond — investigative journalist
- Trent Copeland — CBS trial analyst
- Kevin Smith — Splash News Agency

=== Jurors ===
- Melissa Herard — juror No. 8
- Tammy Evans — juror No. 6

=== Connections to Jackson ===
- J. Randy Taraborrelli — Jackson's biographer
- Raymone Bain — Jackson's publicist
- Stacy Brown — former Jackson family friend
- Vincent Amen — Jackson associate, 2002–2003
- Kerry Anderson — Director of security

== Production ==
Michael Jackson: The Verdict was directed by Nick Green and produced by Candle True Stories, with David Herman serving as showrunner and executive producer alongside Fiona Stourton and James Goldston. According to statements released through Netflix's Tudum, Green and Stourton said the project was developed as a re-examination of the trial from a historical perspective. They noted that because cameras were not allowed inside the courtroom during the proceedings, much of the public understanding of the case had been shaped by outside reporting and commentary. According to Los Angeles Times, the production also interviewed journalists who covered the case at the time, with the intention of presenting the trial through the experiences of people who directly witnessed the events.

== Release ==
Netflix announced the series on May 20, 2026, alongside the release of its official trailer and confirmation of a June 3 premiere date. The trailer included archival footage related to the investigation at Neverland Ranch, courtroom coverage and interviews reflecting on the allegations and public reaction to the case.

== Reception ==
=== Critical response ===
The series holds a Rotten Tomatoes critic's score of 82%. Critics noted that the documentary covers the 2005 child molestation trial and legal controversies that the estate-approved theatrical biopic excluded. While some reviewers found the retrospective look into mid-2000s media hysteria and courtroom logistics insightful, others criticized the series for offering no new details or historical insights.

=== Audience viewership ===
Audience viewing figures show Michael Jackson: The Verdict was watched by 17.8 million people in its first five days of digital release worldwide in the English language the week ending June 7, 2026. It also was the most-viewed show reaching #1 in 61 countries during the same week with 17 in the Americas (including United States, Brazil, Canada), 29 in Europe (United Kingdom, Germany, France, Ireland), and #1 in Australia and New Zealand. It reached the top 10 in 89 countries the same week. In the second week ending June 14, 2026, it remained in the top 10 in 81 countries with 7.2 million views that week, remaining at #1 in eight countries including Canada, the United States, Switzerland and Austria.
