= The People vs. Michael Jackson =

2025 Australian documentary television film

- Directed by: Stephanie Soechtig
- Starring: Nancy Grace; Linda Deutsch; Farai Chideya; Jane Velez-Mitchell; Alicia Quarles; Jem Aswad; Steve Knopper; Thomas Mesereau; Ray Hultman; Tammy Bolton; Melissa Herard; J. Randy Taraborrelli; Dan Abrams; Ron Zonen; Kenneth Lanning; Stan Katz; Vincent Amen; Azja Pryor
- Country of origin: Australia
- Original language: English

Production
- Running time: 162 minutes
- Production company: Nine Network

Original release
- Network: Nine Network
- Release: 13 April 2025

The People vs. Michael Jackson is a two-part Australian documentary film detailing the 2005 criminal trial of pop musician Michael Jackson. It sheds light on the legal, media, and social contexts of the trial, which caused a worldwide sensation. The documentary consists of two parts, each about 80 minutes long.

== Plot ==
The documentary reconstructs the criminal trial against Michael Jackson, who stood trial in 2005 on charges of sexually abusing the then 13-year-old Gavin Arvizo and was acquitted on all 14 charges. The trial attracted international attention and was described as the trial of the century.

The documentary combines previously unpublished video footage, court transcripts and over 30 interviews with jury members, lawyers, reporters, observers and prominent witnesses. The focus is on original testimony from those involved in the trial, including brothers Gavin and Star Arvizo, who appeared as key witnesses, and Jackson's defence lawyer at the time, Thomas Mesereau. TV personalities such as Larry King and reporters at the time also have their say.

The documentary shows the course of the trial and at the same time sheds light on how the media, public opinion, fame, wealth and power influenced the justice system.

== Release ==
The documentary was produced as early as 2022, but was not broadcast publicly until 2025. The first part was first broadcast on 13 April 2025 on the Australian television channel Nine and its streaming service 9Now. The second part followed a week later.

== See also ==
- Leaving Neverland
- Living with Michael Jackson
- The Michael Jackson Interview: The Footage You Were Never Meant To See
