= My Killer Father: The Green Hollow Murders =

2026 American TV series

- Genre: Documentary
- Directed by: Aengus James
- Country of origin: United States
- Original language: English
- No. of episodes: 3

Production
- Executive producer: Paul Lima Terence Wrong Susan Zirinsky
- Producer: Aengus James
- Running time: 2
- Production companies: Skydance Television; See It Now Studios; This is Just a Test Productions

Original release
- Network: Paramount+
- Release: April 28, 2026

My Killer Father: The Green Hollow Murders is an American true crime documentary television series that premiered on Paramount+ on April 28, 2026. The three-part series was directed by Aengus James and produced by See It Now Studios in association with This Is Just a Test Productions.

The series examines allegations against Donald Dean Studey, an Iowa man known locally as "The Monster of Green Hollow," who is accused of killing dozens of women over several decades, including three of his wives whose deaths had previously been ruled suicides. The investigation centers on his daughter, Lucy Studey McKiddy, who alleges that she and her siblings were forced as children to help bury bodies in an old well on the family's rural property. Her public allegations divided the Studey family and prompted renewed law enforcement and journalistic interest in long-standing local rumors. In 2022, the FBI was working with the Iowa Division of Criminal Investigation to investigate the claims. The docuseries draws on a three-year investigation by the filmmakers, incorporating witness interviews, archival material, forensic reexamination, and on-site excavation footage.

All three episodes were released simultaneously at launch. Episode one, "The Women," introduces Lucy's claims and their effect on her family and community. Episode two revisits the deaths of Studey's wives and surfaces additional accusations of abuse from former partners. The third episode, "The Wells," follows the excavation effort and presents a deathbed confession along with new forensic analysis of one wife's death.

The series carries a TV-MA rating for its subject matter, which includes domestic abuse, alleged homicide, and discussion of remains. It is available exclusively on Paramount+ in the United States and Canada, with no theatrical or alternate streaming release.

== Developments ==
Because earlier law enforcement efforts had stalled after a December 2022 dig by the FBI and the Iowa Division of Criminal Investigation produced no conclusive evidence, the production company financed its own forensic excavation of the Green Hollow site to support the documentary. The work was led by William Belcher, an associate professor of forensic anthropology at the University of Nebraska–Lincoln, who was joined by five graduate students. Crews used cadaver dogs and ground-penetrating radar to identify potential well shafts on the hillside, and a five-day dig was conducted in late May 2025, with reporters and a photographer from Lee Enterprises on site.

The privately funded excavation did not locate any additional wells beyond the same wet well already examined by federal and state investigators in 2022, and no human remains were recovered. Belcher, Studey-McKiddy and a third collaborator agreed to continue searching for further well locations and to notify law enforcement in the event of a discovery. Studey-McKiddy publicly called for a more extensive dig of the property.

The production team also pursued a parallel inquiry into the 1983 death of Charlotte Studey, one of Donald Studey's wives, whose death had been ruled a suicide. Working with Charlotte's surviving daughters, the filmmakers said they had developed evidence supporting a homicide finding. Following an exhumation and second autopsy commissioned in connection with the documentary, her manner of death was reclassified as undetermined, although no homicide ruling has been issued. A separate legal dispute between Charlotte Studey's daughters and the Omaha Police Department over the release of original investigative records remained ongoing during production.

== Episodes ==
No.	Title	Original release date
1	"The Women"	April 28, 2026
Lucy's allegation about her father's alleged murders causes conflict with her sisters and problems in a small town.
2	"The Wives"	April 28, 2026
All five women who had been married to Don had accused him of abuse; two of the three are dead.
3	"The Wells"	April 28, 2026
A second excavation occurs; the death of a former wife is reexamined to see if the cause of death was murder.
