= Fave TV =

American digital subchannel television network

- Country: United States

Programming
- Picture format: 480i (SDTV, widescreen)

Ownership
- Owner: Paramount Skydance Corporation
- Parent: CBS Entertainment Group

History
- Launched: December 15, 2020; 5 years ago
- Closed: February 2, 2026; 9 months ago

Links
- Website: https://www.favetv.com/ (redirects to Paramount+)

Fave TV was an American digital multicast television network owned by the CBS Entertainment Group, a subsidiary of Paramount Skydance Corporation. The channel launched in the markets covered by CBS Television Stations on December 15, 2020, usually as a DT4 subchannel. The network had no other distribution channels outside that limited over-the-air availability and rare distribution over local cable systems.

The channel quietly shut down on February 2, 2026, and was replaced with either Outlaw or 365BLK from Free TV Networks if already not replaced, as some stations had done before the end of January, with no public statement of its winddown outside its website indicating no further program listings after February 2, and a subsequent redirection of its website to Paramount+.

== Programming ==
The network's programming was mostly taken from the program archives of Paramount Skydance's adult networks, along with syndicated sitcom repeats from its suite of cable networks, and overnight paid programming.

== Former affiliates ==
City of license / Market	Station	Channel TV (RF)
Atlanta	WUPA	69.5 (36)
Baltimore	WJZ-TV	13.4 (11)
Boston	WBZ-TV	4.4 (20)
Chicago	WBBM-TV	2.4 (12)
Dallas - Fort Worth	KTVT	11.4 (19)
Detroit	WWJ-TV	62.4 (21)
Los Angeles	KCBS-TV	2.4 (31)
Miami - Fort Lauderdale	WFOR-TV	4.4 (22)
Minneapolis - St. Paul	WCCO-TV	4.4 (32)
Minneapolis - St. Paul	KCCW-TV (satellite of WCCO-TV)	12.4 (12)
New York City	WCBS-TV	2.4 (36)
Philadelphia	WPSG	57.5 (33)
Pittsburgh	KDKA-TV	2.4 (25)
Sacramento - Stockton - Modesto	KOVR	13.4 (25)
San Francisco - Oakland - San Jose	KPIX-TV	5.4 (29)
Seattle - Tacoma	KSTW	11.3 (11)
Tampa - St. Petersburg	WTOG	44.3 (19)
