= The Coach Vick Experience =

2026 television documentary series

- Genre: Documentary
- Starring: Michael Vick
- Country of origin: United States
- Original language: English
- No. of series: 1
- No. of episodes: 8

Production
- Executive producers: Constance Schwartz-Morini; FredAnthony Smith; Michael Vick; Kijafa Vick; Michael Strahan; Deion Sanders; Tiffany Lea Williams; Angela Aguilera
- Production company: SMAC Entertainment

Original release
- Network: BET
- Release: February 4 – March 25, 2026

The Coach Vick Experience is an American television documentary series that premiered on February 4, 2026 and ended on March 25, 2026 on BET.

== Episodes ==
No.	Title	Original release date	U.S. viewers (millions)
1	"All Eyes On Norfolk"	February 4, 2026	N/A
2	"Big State vs. Little State"	February 11, 2026	N/A
3	"The Money Game"	February 18, 2026	N/A
4	"Battle of the Baes"	February 25, 2026	N/A
5	"Homecoming"	March 4, 2026	N/A
6	"The Philly HBCU Showdown"	March 11, 2026	N/A
7	"The Breaking Point"	March 18, 2026	N/A
8	"The Portal and the Pressure"	March 25, 2026	N/A
