= Million Dollar Nannies =

Reality television series

- Genre: Reality
- Country of origin: United States
- Original language: English
- No. of seasons: 1
- No. of episodes: 8

Production
- Executive producers: Andrea Metz; Michelle Peerali; Patrick Agans; Ross Weintraub; Reinout Oerlemans
- Running time: 60 minutes

Original release
- Network: Hulu; Freeform
- Release: June 17, 2026 – present

Related
- Supernanny; Supernanny (American TV series)

Million Dollar Nannies is an American reality television series which premiered on Hulu and Freeform on June 17, 2026. The show features eight nannies who are housed in Ibiza as they try to gain employment with high net worth clients. Andrea Metz and Michelle Peerali serve as executive producers and Omid Kahangi serves as the showrunner.

== Nannies ==
The eight nannies are:

- Leah Bares, who has worked as a nanny for the Kardashian/Jenner family
- Jack McCann
- Hannah Joy Davis
- Mitchell Bienvenue
- Taylor Hayward
- Olivia McMahon
- Tamaya Denae
- Sydney Siegel

== Families ==
The families include a three-father unit with Mark Ebinger, Tom Freeman, and Moke Coffey, and entrepreneur Nicola Wills.

== Episodes ==
Million Dollar Nannies, season-one episodes
No.	Title	Directed by	Written by	Original release date
1	"Where's the Nanny?"	Unknown	Unknown	June 17, 2026
2	"Princess for an Hour"	Unknown	Unknown	June 17, 2026
3	"Cardinal Sin"	Unknown	Unknown	June 24, 2026
4	"I Know Your Secret"	Unknown	Unknown	July 1, 2026
5	"She's a Dangerous Lady"	Unknown	Unknown	July 8, 2026
6	"Coup d'Jack"	Unknown	Unknown	July 15, 2026
7	"The King of Ibiza"	TBA	TBA	July 22, 2026
8	"By Nannies for Nannies"	TBA	TBA	July 22, 2026

== Reception ==
Amber Dowling of The Globe and Mail gave the show a poor review. Writing for Slate, Rebecca Onion faulted the show for treating the children as "baggage" and "non-entities".
