= Trent Copeland (lawyer) =

American trial lawyer

- Education: George Washington University Law School
- Known for: Lawyer to celebrities
- Website: www.trentcopeland.com

Trent Copeland (born December 24) is an American trial lawyer.

Copeland received a bachelor's degree from Dartmouth College and a Juris Doctor (J.D.) from George Washington University Law School. Copeland represented Shannen Doherty in her arrest for drunk driving and he successfully defended Jean-Claude Van Damme in his Beverly Hills criminal matter. His clients have included Hollywood celebrities and studio executives. Copeland also represented a music producer in an assault case stemming from an altercation with Mötley Crüe lead singer Vince Neil.

Copeland is often seen on CBS News and CNN's "Larry King Live" commenting and providing legal analysis on celebrity or national legal news stories.

Copeland is licensed to practice law in California.
