= 2009–10 United States network television schedule =

The 2009–10 network television schedule for the five major English-language commercial broadcast networks in the United States covers primetime hours from September 2009 through August 2010. The schedule is followed by a list per network of returning series, new series, and series canceled after the 2008–09 season.

Fox was the first to announce its fall schedule on May 18, 2009, followed by ABC and NBC on May 19, CBS on May 20, and The CW on May 21, 2009.

PBS is not included; member stations have local flexibility over most of their schedules and broadcasts times for network shows may vary. Ion Television is also not included since the network's schedule consisted mainly of syndicated reruns and movies. NBC stripped The Jay Leno Show weeknights at 10 p.m. Eastern/9 p.m. Central, but removed it after the 2010 Vancouver Winter Olympics. The CW eliminated its Sunday night programming block and returned that time to local affiliates; it returned to programming Sunday nights in the 2018-19 season. After four years as a network, MyNetworkTV became a programming service similarly to The CW Plus and therefore not recognized as a network.

New series are highlighted in bold.

All times are U.S. Eastern and Pacific Time (except for some live sports or events). Subtract one hour for Central, Mountain, Alaska and Hawaii–Aleutian times.

Note: From February 12 to February 28, 2010, all NBC primetime programming was pre-empted for coverage of 2010 Winter Olympics in Vancouver.

Each of the 30 highest-rated shows is listed with its rank and rating as determined by Nielsen Media Research.

== Legend ==
- Light blue indicates local programming.
- Gray indicates encore programming.
- Blue-gray indicates news programming.
- Light green indicates sporting events.
- Red indicates series being burned off and other regularly scheduled programs, including specials and movies.
- Light gold indicates programming produced outside of the United States.
- highlight Yellow highlights indicates the top-10 most watched programs of the season.
- highlight Cyan highlights indicates numbers 11-20 most watched programs of the season.
- highlight Magenta highlights indicates numbers 21-30 most watched programs of the season.
- highlight Highlights indicates that it falls in multiple of the above categories.

== Sunday ==
Network		7:00 p.m.	7:30 p.m.	8:00 p.m.	8:30 p.m.	9:00 p.m.	9:30 p.m.	10:00 p.m.	10:30 p.m.
ABC	Fall	America's Funniest Home Videos		Extreme Makeover: Home Edition		Desperate Housewives (13/8.8)		Brothers & Sisters (23/7.0)	
ABC	Winter	America's Funniest Home Videos		Extreme Makeover: Home Edition		Desperate Housewives (13/8.8)		Brothers & Sisters (23/7.0)	
ABC	Spring	America's Funniest Home Videos		Extreme Makeover: Home Edition		Desperate Housewives (13/8.8)		Brothers & Sisters (23/7.0)	
ABC	Summer	America's Funniest Home Videos		Extreme Makeover: Home Edition		**Scoundrels**		**The Gates**	
CBS	Fall	60 Minutes (17/8.4)		The Amazing Race (26/6.6)		**Three Rivers**		Cold Case (29/6.3) (Tied with Private Practice)	
CBS	Late fall	60 Minutes (17/8.4)		Various programming		Cold Case (29/6.3) (Tied with Private Practice)		Cold Case (R)	
CBS	Winter	60 Minutes (17/8.4)		The Amazing Race (26/6.6)		**Undercover Boss** (8/9.8) (Tied with **NCIS: Los Angeles**)		Cold Case (29/6.3) (Tied with Private Practice)	
CBS	Spring	60 Minutes (17/8.4)		Various programming				Cold Case (29/6.3) (Tied with Private Practice)	
CBS	Summer	60 Minutes (17/8.4)		Big Brother		**Undercover Boss** (R)		Cold Case (29/6.3) (Tied with Private Practice)	
Fox	Fall	Fox NFL (4:15 p.m.)	The OT	The Simpsons	The Cleveland Show	Family Guy	American Dad!	Local programming	
Fox	Winter	'Til Death		The Simpsons	The Cleveland Show	Family Guy	American Dad!	Local programming	
Fox	Late winter	'Til Death		The Simpsons	The Cleveland Show	Family Guy	**Sons of Tucson**	Local programming	
Fox	Spring	'Til Death	The Simpsons (R)	The Simpsons	The Cleveland Show	Family Guy	American Dad!	Local programming	
Fox	Summer	'Til Death	**Sons of Tucson**	The Simpsons	The Cleveland Show	Family Guy	American Dad!	Local programming	
Fox	Mid-summer	**Sons of Tucson**	American Dad! (R)	The Simpsons	The Cleveland Show	Family Guy	Family Guy (R)	Local programming	
Fox	Late summer	American Dad! (R)	The Simpsons (R)	The Simpsons	The Cleveland Show	Family Guy	Family Guy (R)	Local programming	
NBC	Fall	Football Night in America		NBC Sunday Night Football (8:15 p.m.) (continued to game completion) (5/11.3)					
NBC	Winter	Dateline NBC				Various programming			
NBC	Spring	Dateline NBC		**Minute to Win It**		The Apprentice			
NBC	Summer	Dateline NBC		Law & Order: Criminal Intent (R)		America's Got Talent (R)			

== Monday ==
Network		8:00 p.m.	8:30 p.m.	9:00 p.m.	9:30 p.m.	10:00 p.m.	10:30 p.m.
ABC	Fall	Dancing with the Stars (3/12.6)				Castle (24/6.9) (Tied with Lost)	
ABC	Mid-fall	Holiday specials		**Find My Family**		Castle (24/6.9) (Tied with Lost)	
ABC	Winter	The Bachelor (21/7.8)				Castle (24/6.9) (Tied with Lost)	
ABC	Spring	Dancing with the Stars (3/12.6)			**Romantically Challenged**	Castle (24/6.9) (Tied with Lost)	
ABC	Summer	The Bachelorette				True Beauty	
ABC	Late summer	**Bachelor Pad**				Dating in the Dark	
CBS	Fall	How I Met Your Mother	**Accidentally on Purpose**	Two and a Half Men (12/8.9)	The Big Bang Theory (14/8.5) (Tied with Criminal Minds and The Good Wife)	CSI: Miami (18/8.1)	
CBS	Winter	How I Met Your Mother	**Accidentally on Purpose**	Two and a Half Men (12/8.9)	The Big Bang Theory (14/8.5) (Tied with Criminal Minds and The Good Wife)	CSI: Miami (18/8.1)	
CBS	Spring	How I Met Your Mother	Rules of Engagement	Two and a Half Men (12/8.9)	The Big Bang Theory (14/8.5) (Tied with Criminal Minds and The Good Wife)	CSI: Miami (18/8.1)	
CBS	Summer	How I Met Your Mother	Rules of Engagement	Two and a Half Men (12/8.9)	The Big Bang Theory (14/8.5) (Tied with Criminal Minds and The Good Wife)	CSI: Miami (18/8.1)	
The CW	Fall	One Tree Hill		Gossip Girl		Local programming	
The CW	Winter	One Tree Hill		**Life Unexpected**		Local programming	
The CW	Spring	**Life Unexpected**		Gossip Girl		Local programming	
The CW	Mid-spring	One Tree Hill		Gossip Girl		Local programming	
The CW	Summer	90210 (R)		Gossip Girl		Local programming	
Fox	Fall	House (22/7.5)		Lie to Me		Local programming	
Fox	Winter	House (22/7.5)		24 (28/6.4)		Local programming	
Fox	Spring	House (22/7.5)		24 (28/6.4)		Local programming	
Fox	Summer	Lie to Me		**The Good Guys**		Local programming	
NBC	Fall	Heroes		**Trauma**		**The Jay Leno Show**	
NBC	Winter	Chuck		Heroes		**The Jay Leno Show**	
NBC	Spring	Chuck		**Trauma**		Law & Order	
NBC	Summer	Last Comic Standing				**Persons Unknown**	
NBC	Mid-summer	Last Comic Standing				Dateline NBC	

== Tuesday ==
Network		8:00 p.m.	8:30 p.m.	9:00 p.m.	9:30 p.m.	10:00 p.m.	10:30 p.m.
ABC	Fall	Shark Tank		Dancing with the Stars (Results) (7/9.9)		**The Forgotten**	
ABC	Mid-fall	**V**		Dancing with the Stars (Results) (7/9.9)		**The Forgotten**	
ABC	Winter	Scrubs (R)	Better Off Ted (R)	Scrubs	Better Off Ted	**The Forgotten**	
ABC	Mid-winter	Lost (R)		Lost (24/6.9) (Tied with Castle)		**The Forgotten**	
ABC	Spring	Dancing with the Stars (Results) (7/9.9)		Lost (24/6.9) (Tied with Castle)		**V**	
ABC	Summer	Wipeout		**Downfall**		Primetime	
ABC	Mid-summer	Wipeout		Shaq Vs.		Primetime	
CBS		NCIS (4/11.5)		**NCIS: Los Angeles** (8/9.8) (Tied with **Undercover Boss**)		**The Good Wife** (14/8.5) (Tied with The Big Bang Theory and Criminal Minds)	
The CW	Fall	90210		**Melrose Place**		Local programming	
The CW	Winter	90210		**Melrose Place**		Local programming	
The CW	Spring	90210		**Melrose Place**		Local programming	
The CW	Mid-spring	90210		**Life Unexpected** (R)		Local programming	
The CW	Summer	One Tree Hill (R)		**Life Unexpected** (R)		Local programming	
The CW	Mid-summer	**18 to Life**		**Life Unexpected** (R)		Local programming	
Fox	Fall	So You Think You Can Dance				Local programming	
Fox	Winter	American Idol (1/13.7)		Various programming		Local programming	
Fox	Mid-winter	American Idol (1/13.7)				Local programming	
Fox	Spring	American Idol (1/13.7)		**Glee**		Local programming	
Fox	Late spring	Hell's Kitchen				Local programming	
Fox	Summer	Hell's Kitchen		**MasterChef**		Local programming	
Fox	Late summer	**Glee** (R)				Local programming	
NBC	Fall	The Biggest Loser				**The Jay Leno Show**	
NBC	Winter	The Biggest Loser				**The Jay Leno Show**	
NBC	Spring	The Biggest Loser				**Parenthood**	
NBC	Summer	**Losing It with Jillian**		America's Got Talent		Law & Order (R)	
NBC	Mid-summer	**Losing It with Jillian**		America's Got Talent			

== Wednesday ==
Network		8:00 p.m.	8:30 p.m.	9:00 p.m.	9:30 p.m.	10:00 p.m.	10:30 p.m.
ABC	Fall	**Hank**	**The Middle**	**Modern Family**	Cougar Town	**Eastwick**	
ABC	Mid-fall	**Modern Family** (R)	**The Middle**	**Modern Family**	Cougar Town	**Eastwick**	
ABC	Winter	**Modern Family** (R)	**The Middle**	**Modern Family**	Cougar Town	Ugly Betty	
ABC	Late winter	Scrubs	**The Middle**	**Modern Family**	Cougar Town	Ugly Betty	
ABC	Spring	**Modern Family** (R)	**The Middle**	**Modern Family**	Cougar Town	Ugly Betty	
ABC	Late spring	**The Middle** (R)	**The Middle**	**Modern Family**	Cougar Town	**Happy Town**	
ABC	Summer	**The Middle** (R)	**The Middle**	**Modern Family**	Cougar Town	Castle (R)	
CBS	Fall	The New Adventures of Old Christine	Gary Unmarried	Criminal Minds (14/8.5) (Tied with The Big Bang Theory and The Good Wife)		CSI: NY (19/7.9) (Tied with Survivor)	
CBS	Winter	The New Adventures of Old Christine	Gary Unmarried	Criminal Minds (14/8.5) (Tied with The Big Bang Theory and The Good Wife)		CSI: NY (19/7.9) (Tied with Survivor)	
CBS	Spring	The New Adventures of Old Christine	**Accidentally on** **Purpose**	Criminal Minds (14/8.5) (Tied with The Big Bang Theory and The Good Wife)		CSI: NY (19/7.9) (Tied with Survivor)	
CBS	Summer	Big Brother		Criminal Minds (14/8.5) (Tied with The Big Bang Theory and The Good Wife)		CSI: NY (19/7.9) (Tied with Survivor)	
The CW	Fall	America's Next Top Model		**The Beautiful Life**		Local programming	
The CW	Winter	America's Next Top Model		Various programming		Local programming	
The CW	Spring	America's Next Top Model		**Fly Girls**	High Society	Local programming	
The CW	Summer	America's Next Top Model		**Plain Jane**		Local programming	
Fox	Fall	So You Think You Can Dance		**Glee**		Local programming	
Fox	Winter	**Human Target**		American Idol (2/13.3)		Local programming	
Fox	Spring	Lie to Me (R)		American Idol (2/13.3)		Local programming	
Fox	Late spring	So You Think You Can Dance				Local programming	
Fox	Summer	**MasterChef**				Local programming	
NBC	Fall	**Mercy**		Law & Order: Special Victims Unit		**The Jay Leno Show**	
NBC	Winter	**Mercy**		Law & Order: Special Victims Unit		**The Jay Leno Show**	
NBC	Spring	**Minute to Win It**		**Mercy**		Law & Order: Special Victims Unit	
NBC	Summer	America's Got Talent (R)		America's Got Talent		Law & Order: Special Victims Unit	

NOTES: On NBC, Parenthood was supposed to have started the night at 8–9, but it was delayed to midseason at the last minute and placed Mercy instead. On Fox, Our Little Genius was supposed to debut on January 10, 2010 but was cancelled and replaced with American Idol.

== Thursday ==
Network		8:00 p.m.	8:30 p.m.	9:00 p.m.	9:30 p.m.	10:00 p.m.	10:30 p.m.
ABC	Fall	**FlashForward**		Grey's Anatomy (11/9.0)		Private Practice (29/6.3) (Tied with Cold Case)	
ABC	Winter	**The Deep End**		Grey's Anatomy (11/9.0)		Private Practice (29/6.3) (Tied with Cold Case)	
ABC	Spring	**FlashForward**		Grey's Anatomy (11/9.0)		Private Practice (29/6.3) (Tied with Cold Case)	
ABC	Summer	Wipeout		**Rookie Blue**		**Boston Med**	
ABC	Late summer	Wipeout		**Rookie Blue**		**Head Cases**	
CBS	Fall	Survivor (19/7.9) (Tied with CSI: NY)		CSI: Crime Scene Investigation (10/9.7)		The Mentalist (6/10.6)	
CBS	Winter	Survivor (19/7.9) (Tied with CSI: NY)		CSI: Crime Scene Investigation (10/9.7)		The Mentalist (6/10.6)	
CBS	Spring	Survivor (19/7.9) (Tied with CSI: NY)		CSI: Crime Scene Investigation (10/9.7)		The Mentalist (6/10.6)	
CBS	Summer	Big Brother		CSI: Crime Scene Investigation (10/9.7)		The Mentalist (6/10.6)	
The CW	Fall	**The Vampire Diaries**		Supernatural		Local programming	
The CW	Winter	**The Vampire Diaries**		Supernatural		Local programming	
The CW	Spring	**The Vampire Diaries**		Supernatural		Local programming	
The CW	Summer	**The Vampire Diaries**		Moonlight (R)		Local programming	
Fox	Fall	Bones (27/6.5)		Fringe		Local programming	
Fox	Winter	Bones (27/6.5)		**Past Life**		Local programming	
Fox	Spring	Bones (27/6.5)		Fringe		Local programming	
Fox	Late spring	**Glee** (R)		So You Think You Can Dance		Local programming	
MNT		My Thursday Night Movie				Local programming	
NBC	Fall	Saturday Night; Live Weekend; Update Thursday	Parks and Recreation	The Office	**Community**	**The Jay Leno Show**	
NBC	Mid-fall	**Community**	Parks and Recreation	The Office	30 Rock	**The Jay Leno Show**	
NBC	Winter	**Community**	Parks and Recreation	The Office	30 Rock	**The Jay Leno Show**	
NBC	Spring	**Community**	Parks and Recreation	The Office	30 Rock	**The Marriage Ref**	
NBC	Summer	**Community**	**100 Questions**	The Office	30 Rock	The Office (R)	Parks and Recreation (R)
NBC	Mid-summer	**Community**	30 Rock (R)	The Office	Parks and Recreation (R)	Law & Order: Special Victims Unit (R)	

== Friday ==
Network		8:00 p.m.	8:30 p.m.	9:00 p.m.	9:30 p.m.	10:00 p.m.	10:30 p.m.
ABC	Fall	Supernanny		Ugly Betty		20/20	
ABC	Winter	Supernanny		Shark Tank		20/20	
ABC	Spring	Wife Swap		**Jamie Oliver's Food Revolution**		20/20	
ABC	Summer	Wife Swap		Primetime		20/20	
CBS	Fall	Ghost Whisperer		Medium		Numb3rs	
CBS	Winter	Ghost Whisperer		Medium		Numb3rs	
CBS	Spring	Ghost Whisperer		Medium		**Miami Medical**	
CBS	Summer	Medium (R)		Flashpoint		**Miami Medical**	
CBS	Mid-summer	Medium (R)		CSI: NY (R)		Flashpoint	
The CW	Fall	Smallville		America's Next Top Model (R)		Local programming	
The CW	Winter	Smallville		America's Next Top Model (R)		Local programming	
The CW	Spring	Smallville		America's Next Top Model (R)		Local programming	
The CW	Summer	Smallville		Supernatural (R)		Local programming	
Fox	Fall	**Brothers**	'Til Death	Dollhouse		Local programming	
Fox	Mid-fall	House (R)		Bones (R)		Local programming	
Fox	Late fall	Dollhouse				Local programming	
Fox	Winter	House (R)		Kitchen Nightmares		Local programming	
Fox	Spring	**Past Life**		House (R)		Local programming	
Fox	Summer	Bones (R)		House (R)		Local programming	
MNT		WWE Friday Night SmackDown				Local programming	
NBC	Fall	Law & Order		Dateline NBC		**The Jay Leno Show**	
NBC	Winter	Law & Order		Dateline NBC		**The Jay Leno Show**	
NBC	Spring	**Who Do You Think You Are?**		Dateline NBC			
NBC	Summer	Friday Night Lights (R)		Dateline NBC			

NOTE: On NBC, Southland would have to be aired 9–10, but it was cancelled at the last minute and it was picked up by TNT.

== Saturday ==
Network		8:00 p.m.	8:30 p.m.	9:00 p.m.	9:30 p.m.	10:00 p.m.	10:30 p.m.
ABC	Fall	ESPN Saturday Night Football (continued to game completion)					
ABC	Winter	ABC Saturday Movie of the Week				Castle (R)	
CBS	Fall	Crimetime Saturday				48 Hours	
CBS	Summer	**Three Rivers**		Crimetime Saturday		48 Hours	
CBS	Mid-summer	**The Bridge**		Crimetime Saturday		48 Hours	
CBS	Late summer	Crimetime Saturday				48 Hours	
Fox		COPS	COPS (R)	America's Most Wanted		Local programming	
NBC	Fall	**Mercy** (R)		Law & Order (R)		Law & Order: Special Victims Unit (R)	
NBC	Spring	**Parenthood** (R)		Law & Order (R)		Law & Order: Special Victims Unit (R)	
NBC	Summer	**Persons Unknown**		Law & Order: Criminal Intent (R)			

== By network ==
=== ABC ===
Returning series:

- 20/20
- ABC Saturday Movie of the Week
- America's Funniest Home Videos
- The Bachelor
- The Bachelorette
- Better Off Ted
- Brothers & Sisters
- Castle
- Dancing with the Stars
- Dating in the Dark
- Desperate Housewives
- Extreme Makeover: Home Edition
- Grey's Anatomy
- Lost
- Primetime
- Primetime: What Would You Do?
- Private Practice
- Saturday Night Football
- Scrubs
- Shaq Vs.
- Shark Tank
- Supernanny
- True Beauty
- Ugly Betty
- Wipeout
- Wife Swap

New series:

- **Bachelor Pad** *
- **Cougar Town**
- **The Deep End** *
- **Downfall** *
- **Eastwick**
- **Find My Family**
- **FlashForward**
- **The Forgotten**
- **The Gates** *
- **Hank**
- **Happy Town** *
- **Jamie Oliver's Food Revolution** *
- **The Middle**
- **Modern Family**
- **Romantically Challenged** *
- **Rookie Blue** *
- **Scoundrels** *
- **V**

Not returning from 2008–09:

- According to Jim
- Boston Legal
- Crash Course
- Cupid
- Dirty Sexy Money
- Eli Stone
- The Goode Family
- Homeland Security USA
- In the Motherhood
- I Survived a Japanese Game Show
- Life on Mars
- Opportunity Knocks
- Pushing Daisies
- Samantha Who?
- The Superstars
- Surviving Suburbia
- The Unusuals

=== CBS ===
Returning series:

- 48 Hours
- 60 Minutes
- The Amazing Race
- The Big Bang Theory
- Cold Case
- Criminal Minds
- CSI: Crime Scene Investigation
- CSI: Miami
- CSI: NY
- Flashpoint
- Gary Unmarried
- Ghost Whisperer
- How I Met Your Mother
- Medium (moved from NBC)
- The Mentalist
- NCIS
- The New Adventures of Old Christine
- Numb3rs
- Rules of Engagement
- Survivor
- Two and a Half Men

New series:

- **Accidentally on Purpose**
- **Arranged Marriage**
- **The Bridge** *
- **The Good Wife**
- **Miami Medical** *
- **NCIS: Los Angeles**
- **Three Rivers**
- **Undercover Boss** *

Not returning from 2008–09:

- Eleventh Hour
- The Ex List
- Game Show in My Head
- Harper's Island
- Million Dollar Password
- The Unit
- Without a Trace
- Worst Week

=== The CW ===
Returning series:

- 90210
- America's Next Top Model
- Gossip Girl
- Moonlight (only reruns, previously on CBS)
- One Tree Hill
- Smallville
- Supernatural

New series:

- **18 to Life** *
- **The Beautiful Life: TBL**
- **Blonde Charity Mafia** (Canceled before airing any episodes)
- **Fly Girls** *
- **High Society** *
- **Life Unexpected** *
- **Melrose Place**
- **Plain Jane** *
- **The Vampire Diaries**

Not returning from 2008–09:

- 13: Fear Is Real
- 4Real
- The CW Sunday Night Movie
- Easy Money
- Everybody Hates Chris
- The Game (moved to BET in 2011)
- In Harm's Way
- Privileged
- Reaper
- Stylista
- Valentine

=== Fox ===
Returning series:

- 24
- America's Most Wanted
- American Dad!
- American Idol
- Bones
- Cops
- Dollhouse
- Family Guy
- Fringe
- Hell's Kitchen
- House
- Kitchen Nightmares
- Lie to Me
- NFL on Fox
- The OT
- The Simpsons
- So You Think You Can Dance
- 'Til Death

New series:

- **Brothers**
- **The Cleveland Show**
- **Glee**
- **The Good Guys** *
- **Human Target** *
- **MasterChef** *
- **Past Life** *
- **Sons of Tucson** *

Not returning from 2008–09:

- Are You Smarter than a 5th Grader? (returned for 2014–15)
- Do Not Disturb
- Don't Forget the Lyrics! (revived for 2021–22)
- Hole in the Wall (moved to Cartoon Network)
- King of the Hill (moved to syndication in 2010)
- Mad TV (returning on The CW in 2016)
- Mental
- More to Love
- Osbournes Reloaded
- Prison Break (returned for 2016–17)
- Secret Millionaire (moved to ABC in 2010–11)
- Sit Down, Shut Up
- Terminator: The Sarah Connor Chronicles

=== MyNetworkTV ===
Returning series:

- Are You Smarter than a 5th Grader? (first run syndication)
- Magic's Biggest Secrets Revealed (repeats, airs in place of movies some weeks)
- Deal or No Deal (first run syndication)
- Law & Order: Criminal Intent (syndicated repeats)
- My Thursday Night Movie (feature film repeats)
- The Unit (syndicated repeats)
- WWE SmackDown

New series:

- None, due to MyNetworkTV's decision to air syndicated programming only

Not returning from 2008–09:

- Celebrity Exposé
- Comics Unleashed
- Jail
- Masters of Illusion
- My Saturday Night Movie
- Street Patrol
- The Tony Rock Project
- The Twilight Zone
- Under One Roof
- Vice Squad
- Whacked Out Videos
- World's Funniest Moments

=== NBC ===
Returning series:

- 30 Rock
- America's Got Talent
- The Apprentice
- The Biggest Loser
- Chuck
- Football Night in America
- Heroes
- Last Comic Standing
- Law & Order
- Law & Order: Special Victims Unit
- NBC Sunday Night Football
- The Office
- Parks and Recreation
- Saturday Night Live Weekend Update Thursday

New series:

- **100 Questions** *
- **Community**
- **The Jay Leno Show**
- **Losing It with Jillian** *
- **The Marriage Ref** *
- **Mercy**
- **Minute to Win It** *
- **Parenthood** *
- **Persons Unknown** *
- **The Sing-Off**
- **Trauma**
- **Who Do You Think You Are?** *

Not returning from 2008–09:

- America's Toughest Jobs
- The Chopping Block
- Crusoe
- Deal or No Deal (revived by CNBC in 2018)
- ER
- The Great American Road Trip
- Howie Do It
- I'm a Celebrity...Get Me Out of Here!
- Kath & Kim
- Kings
- Knight Rider
- Life
- Lipstick Jungle
- The Listener (moved to Ion Television in 2012–13)
- Medium (moved to CBS)
- Merlin (moved to Syfy)
- Momma's Boys
- My Name Is Earl
- My Own Worst Enemy
- The Philanthropist
- Southland (moved to TNT)
- Superstars of Dance

== Renewals and cancellations ==
=== Full season pickups ===
ABC

- Castle – picked up for a full 22-episode season on October 20, 2009. An additional 2 episodes were ordered for a 24-episode season on January 27, 2010.
- Cougar Town – picked up for a full 22-episode season on October 8, 2009. An additional 2 episodes were ordered for a 24-episode season on January 6, 2010.
- FlashForward – picked up for a full 22-episode season on October 12, 2009. 3 additional episodes ordered later the same day for a 25-episode season.
- The Forgotten – picked up for 5 additional episodes for an 18-episode season on November 10, 2009.
- The Middle – picked up for a full 22-episode season on October 8, 2009.
- Modern Family – picked up for a full 22-episode season on October 8, 2009.

CBS

- Accidentally on Purpose – picked up for 5 additional episodes for an 18-episode season on November 3, 2009. Cancelled.
- The Good Wife – picked up for a full 22-episode season on October 7, 2009. One additional episode was later ordered for a 23-episode season.
- NCIS: Los Angeles – picked up for a full 22-episode season on October 7, 2009. An additional 2 episodes were picked up, making a 24-episode season on November 4, 2009.

The CW

- Melrose Place- The CW ordered 6 additional scripts on September 24, 2009. Five of these were then picked up for an 18-episode season on October 21, 2009.
- One Tree Hill – picked up for a full 22-episode season on September 24, 2009.
- The Vampire Diaries – The CW ordered 9 additional scripts on September 24, 2009. Picked up for a full 22-episode season on October 21, 2009.

Fox

- The Cleveland Show – picked up for a full 22-episode first season on November 10, 2008.
- Glee – picked up for a full 22-episode season on September 21, 2009.
- Lie to Me – picked up for a full 22-episode season on November 24, 2009

NBC

- Chuck – picked up for an additional 6 episodes, bringing the total to 19, on October 28, 2009.
- Community – picked up for a full 22-episode season on October 23, 2009. An additional 3 episodes were ordered January 20, 2010 for a 25-episode season.
- Law & Order – picked up for an additional 3 episodes on January 20, 2010, for a 22-episode season.
- Law & Order: Special Victims Unit – picked up for an additional 2 episodes on January 20, 2010, for a 25-episode season.
- Mercy – picked up for a full 22-episode season on October 23, 2009.
- Parks and Recreation – picked up for a full 22-episode season on October 23, 2009. An additional 3 episodes were ordered January 20, 2010 for a 25-episode season.
- Trauma – picked up for an additional 3 episodes, bringing the total to 16, on November 19, 2009. An additional 4 episodes were ordered January 20, 2010 for a 20-episode season.

=== Renewals ===
ABC

- Brothers & Sisters – Renewed for a fifth season on March 5, 2010.
- Castle – Renewed for a third season on March 30, 2010.
- Cougar Town – Renewed for a second season on January 12, 2010.
- Desperate Housewives – Renewed for a seventh season on May 14, 2010.
- Grey's Anatomy – Renewed for a seventh season on May 14, 2010.
- The Middle – Renewed for a second season on January 12, 2010.
- Modern Family – Renewed for a second season on January 12, 2010.
- Private Practice – Renewed for a fourth season on May 14, 2010.
- Rookie Blue – Renewed for a second season on July 12, 2010.
- V – Renewed for a second season on May 13, 2010.

CBS

- The Amazing Race – Renewed for a seventeenth season on January 25, 2010.
- The Big Bang Theory – Renewed for two additional seasons in March 2009, running through its fourth season in 2010/11.
- The Good Wife – Renewed for a second season on January 14, 2010.
- How I Met Your Mother- Renewed for a sixth season on January 25, 2010.
- The Mentalist – Renewed for a third season on May 19, 2010.
- NCIS – Renewed for an eighth season on May 19, 2010.
- NCIS: Los Angeles – Renewed for a second season on January 14, 2010.
- Rules of Engagement – Renewed for a fifth season on May 18, 2010.
- Survivor – Renewed for two additional installments on January 25, 2010.
- Two and a Half Men – Renewed for three additional seasons in March 2009, running through its ninth season in 2011/12.
- Undercover Boss – Renewed for a second season on March 9, 2010.

The CW

- 90210 – Renewed for a third season on February 16, 2010.
- America's Next Top Model – Renewed on February 16, 2010.
- Gossip Girl – Renewed for a fourth season on February 16, 2010.
- Life Unexpected – Renewed for a second season on May 18, 2010.
- One Tree Hill – Renewed for an eighth season on May 18, 2010.
- Smallville – Renewed for a tenth and final season on March 4, 2010.
- Supernatural – Renewed for a sixth season on February 16, 2010.
- The Vampire Diaries – Renewed for a second season on February 16, 2010.

Fox

- American Dad! – Renewed for an additional season in October 2009, running through its sixth season in 2010/11.
- Bones – Renewed for two additional seasons in May 2009, running through its sixth season in 2010/11.
- The Cleveland Show – Renewed for an additional season in October 2009, running through its second season in 2010/11.
- Family Guy – Renewed for a ninth season (airing 2010/11) prior to the 2009/10 season premiere.
- Fringe – Renewed for a third season on March 6, 2010.
- Glee – Renewed for a second season on January 11, 2010.
- House – Renewed for a seventh season on May 17, 2010.
- Human Target – Renewed for a second season on May 12, 2010.
- Lie to Me – Renewed for a third season on May 12, 2010.
- The Simpsons – Renewed for two additional seasons in February 2009, running through its twenty-second season in 2010/11.

NBC

- 30 Rock – Renewed for a fifth season on March 5, 2010.
- The Apprentice – Renewed for a tenth season on March 17, 2010.
- Chuck – Renewed for a fourth season on May 13, 2010.
- Community – Renewed for a second season on March 5, 2010.
- Law & Order: Special Victims Unit – Renewed for a twelfth season on May 14, 2010.
- The Marriage Ref – Renewed for a second season on April 5, 2010.
- Minute to Win It – Renewed for a second season on April 5, 2010.
- The Office – Renewed for a seventh season on March 5, 2010.
- Parenthood – Renewed for a second season on April 20, 2010.
- Parks and Recreation – Renewed for a third season on January 29, 2010
- The Sing-Off – Renewed for a second season on February 28, 2010.
- Who Do You Think You Are? – Renewed for a second season on April 5, 2010.

=== Cancellations/Series endings ===
==== ABC ====
- Better Off Ted – Canceled on May 13, 2010, after two seasons. ABC announced it would air the final two episodes in June 2010 if the 2010 NBA Finals did not require a seventh game, however a seventh game was played and the two episodes did not air on ABC.
- The Deep End – Canceled on May 14, 2010.
- Defying Gravity – Canceled due to low ratings during the summer.
- Eastwick – Canceled on November 9, 2009.
- FlashForward – Canceled on May 13, 2010.
- The Forgotten – Canceled on May 18, 2010.
- Hank – Canceled on November 11, 2009.
- Happy Town – Canceled on May 18, 2010.
- Lost – It was announced on January 19, 2010, that season six would be the final season. The series concluded on May 23, 2010.
- Romantically Challenged – Canceled on May 13, 2010.
- Scrubs – Canceled on May 13, 2010, after nine seasons. On July 10, 2025, it was announced that the series would return for a tenth season.
- True Beauty – It was canceled with the last episode airing on July 19, 2010.
- Ugly Betty – Canceled on April 14, 2010, after four seasons.

==== CBS ====
- Accidentally On Purpose – Canceled on May 18, 2010.
- Cold Case – Canceled on May 18, 2010, after seven seasons.
- Gary Unmarried – Canceled on May 18, 2010, after two seasons.
- Ghost Whisperer – Canceled on May 18, 2010, after five seasons.
- Miami Medical – Canceled on May 18, 2010.
- The New Adventures of Old Christine – Canceled on May 18, 2010, after five seasons.
- Numb3rs – Canceled on May 18, 2010, after six seasons.
- Three Rivers – Canceled on January 9, 2010.

==== The CW ====
- The Beautiful Life: TBL – Canceled on September 25, 2009, after two low rated episodes. This is the first cancellation of the 2009–10 season. The remaining episodes aired on YouTube in December 2009.
- Blonde Charity Mafia – Canceled on May 20, 2010.
- Fly Girls – Canceled on May 20, 2010.
- High Society – Canceled on May 20, 2010.
- Hitched or Ditched – Canceled on May 20, 2010.
- Melrose Place – Canceled on May 20, 2010.

==== Fox ====
- 24 – It was announced on March 26, 2010, that season eight would be the final season. The series concluded on May 24, 2010. On May 13, 2013, it was announced that the series would return as a limited series, titled 24: Live Another Day in May 2014.
- Brothers – Canceled on March 29, 2010.
- Dollhouse – Canceled on November 11, 2009, after two seasons.
- Past Life – Canceled after three episodes on February 19, 2010, due to low ratings.
- Sons of Tucson – Canceled after four episodes on April 5, 2010, due to low ratings.
- 'Til Death – Brad Garrett confirmed the show's cancellation on March 23, 2010.

==== MyNetworkTV ====
- WWE SmackDown – Moved to Syfy in October 2010. The move leaves MyNetworkTV with no original programming.

==== NBC ====
- Heroes – Canceled on May 14, 2010, after four seasons. It was returned as miniseries titled Heroes: Reborn in 2015.
- The Jay Leno Show – Canceled on January 7, 2010. See the 2010 Tonight Show conflict.
- Law & Order – Canceled on May 13, 2010, after twenty seasons (tying it with Gunsmoke as the longest-running primetime drama). The series concluded on May 24, 2010. On September 28, 2021, it was announced that the series would return for a twenty-first season.
- Mercy – Canceled on May 14, 2010.
- The Philanthropist – Canceled on October 21, 2009.
- Southland – Canceled on October 8, 2009. The series moved to TNT in January 2010.
- Trauma – Canceled on May 14, 2010.

== Top weekly ratings ==
- Data sources: AC Nielsen, TV by the Numbers

=== Total viewers ===
Week	Name	Viewers (in millions)	Network
August 31–September 6	America's Got Talent 9/1	12.81	NBC
September 7–September 13	Sunday Night Football: Chicago Bears at Green Bay Packers	21.10	NBC
September 14–September 20	Sunday Night Football: New York Giants at Dallas Cowboys	24.82	NBC
September 21–September 27	NCIS	20.60	CBS
September 28–October 4	NCIS	21.37	CBS
October 5–October 11	NCIS	20.72	CBS
October 12–October 18	NCIS	21.04	CBS
October 19–October 25	NCIS	21.25	CBS
October 26–November 1	2009 World Series Game 4: New York Yankees at Philadelphia Phillies	22.76	FOX
November 2-November 8	2009 World Series Game 6: Philadelphia Phillies at New York Yankees	22.34	FOX
November 9–November 15	Sunday Night Football: New England Patriots at Indianapolis Colts	22.39	NBC
November 16–November 22	NCIS	20.34	CBS
November 23–November 29	Dancing with the Stars 11/23	20.41	ABC
November 30–December 6	Sunday Night Football: Minnesota Vikings at Arizona Cardinals	20.89	NBC
December 7–December 13	Sunday Night Football: Philadelphia Eagles at New York Giants	20.88	NBC
December 14–December 20	NCIS	20.69	CBS
December 21–December 27	Sunday Night Football: Dallas Cowboys at Washington Redskins	19.04	NBC
December 28–January 3	Sunday Night Football: Cincinnati Bengals at New York Jets	16.33	NBC
January 4–January 10	NFC Wild Card Playoff: Philadelphia Eagles at Dallas Cowboys	32.12	NBC
January 11–January 17	AFC Divisional Playoff: Baltimore Ravens at Indianapolis Colts	30.57	CBS
January 18–January 24	NFC Championship Game: Minnesota Vikings at New Orleans Saints	57.93	FOX
January 25–January 31	52nd Grammy Awards	25.87	CBS
February 1–February 7	Super Bowl XLIV: New Orleans Saints vs. Indianapolis Colts	106.48	CBS
February 8–February 14	2010 Winter Olympics Opening Ceremonies	32.64	NBC
February 15–February 21	2010 Winter Olympics Day 5	29.42	NBC
February 22–February 28	2010 Winter Olympics Day 14	24.52	NBC
March 1–March 7	82nd Academy Awards	41.70	ABC
March 8–March 14	American Idol 3/9	22.75	FOX
March 15–March 21	American Idol 3/16	22.91	FOX
March 22–March 28	American Idol 3/23	24.21	FOX
March 29–April 4	Dancing with the Stars 3/29	22.97	ABC
April 5–April 11	2010 Final Four National Championship: Butler vs. Duke	23.94	CBS
April 12–April 18	American Idol 4/14	21.02	FOX
April 19–April 25	Dancing with the Stars 4/19	21.07	ABC
April 26–May 2	Dancing With The Stars 4/26	20.40	ABC
May 3–May 9	Dancing with the Stars 5/3	19.64	ABC
May 10–May 16	American Idol 5/12	19.57	FOX
May 17–May 23	Dancing with the Stars 5/17	19.04	ABC
May 24–May 30	American Idol 5/26	24.22	FOX
May 31–June 6	2010 NBA Finals Game 2: Boston Celtics at Los Angeles Lakers	15.72	ABC
June 7–June 13	2010 NBA Finals Game 5: Los Angeles Lakers at Boston Celtics	18.65	ABC
June 14–June 20	2010 NBA Finals Game 7: Boston Celtics at Los Angeles Lakers	28.20	ABC
June 21–June 27	America's Got Talent 6/23	12.37	NBC
June 28–July 4	America's Got Talent 6/30	12.94	NBC
July 5–July 11	America's Got Talent 7/7	11.95	NBC
July 12–July 18	2010 Major League Baseball All-Star Game	12.12	FOX
July 19–July 25	America's Got Talent 7/20	10.48	NBC
July 26–August 1	America's Got Talent 7/28	9.76	NBC
August 2–August 8	The Bachelorette	11.74	ABC
August 9–August 15	America's Got Talent 8/11	10.67	NBC
August 16–August 22	NFL Preseason Football: Minnesota Vikings at San Francisco 49ers	10.82	NBC
August 23–August 29	62nd Primetime Emmy Awards	13.50	NBC

=== 18–49 viewers ===
Week	Name	Viewers (in millions)	Network
August 31–September 6	Hell's Kitchen	3.4	FOX
September 7–September 13	Sunday Night Football: Chicago Bears at Green Bay Packers	8.6	NBC
September 14–September 20	Sunday Night Football: New York Giants at Dallas Cowboys	9.8	NBC
September 21–September 27	Sunday Night Football: Indianapolis Colts at Arizona Cardinals	6.8	NBC
September 28–October 4	Sunday Night Football: San Diego Chargers at Pittsburgh Steelers	7.4	NBC
October 5–October 11	Sunday Night Football: Indianapolis Colts at Tennessee Titans	6.2	NBC
October 12–October 18	Sunday Night Football: Chicago Bears at Atlanta Falcons	7.2	NBC
October 19–October 25	Sunday Night Football: Arizona Cardinals at New York Giants	5.9	NBC
October 26–November 1	2009 World Series Game 4: New York Yankees at Philadelphia Phillies	7.8	FOX
November 2–November 8	Sunday Night Football: Dallas Cowboys at Philadelphia Eagles	8.5	NBC
November 9–November 15	Sunday Night Football: New England Patriots at Indianapolis Colts	8.6	NBC
November 16–November 22	Sunday Night Football: Philadelphia Eagles at Chicago Bears	6.6	NBC
November 23–November 29	Sunday Night Football: Pittsburgh Steelers at Baltimore Ravens	7.7	NBC
November 30–December 6	Sunday Night Football: Minnesota Vikings at Arizona Cardinals	7.8	NBC
December 7–December 13	Sunday Night Football: Philadelphia Eagles at New York Giants	7.8	NBC
December 14–December 20	Sunday Night Football: Minnesota Vikings at Carolina Panthers	8.6	NBC
December 21–December 27	Sunday Night Football: Dallas Cowboys at Washington Redskins	6.9	NBC
December 28–January 3	Sunday Night Football: Cincinnati Bengals at New York Jets	6.1	NBC
January 4–January 10	NFC Wild Card Playoff: Philadelphia Eagles at Dallas Cowboys	11.8	NBC
January 11–January 17	American Idol 1/12	11.8	FOX
January 18–January 24	NFC Championship Game: Minnesota Vikings at New Orleans Saints	21.3	FOX
January 25–January 31	52nd Grammy Awards	9.9	CBS
February 1–February 7	Super Bowl XLIV: New Orleans Saints vs. Indianapolis Colts	38.6	CBS
February 8–February 14	American Idol 2/9	10.1	FOX
February 15–February 21	American Idol 2/16	8.2	FOX
February 22–February 28	American Idol 2/23	9.0	FOX
March 1–March 7	82nd Academy Awards 3/3	13.3	ABC
March 8–March 14	American Idol 3/9	8.2	FOX
March 15–March 21	American Idol 3/16	8.1	FOX
March 22–March 28	American Idol 3/23	8.4	FOX
March 29–April 4	American Idol 3/30	7.7	FOX
April 5–April 11	2010 Final Four National Championship: Butler vs. Duke	8.2	CBS
April 12–April 18	American Idol 4/13	7.3	FOX
April 19–April 25	American Idol 4/20	7.1	FOX
April 26–May 2	American Idol 4/27	6.9	FOX
May 3–May 9	American Idol 5/5	6.5	FOX
May 10–May 16	American Idol 5/11	6.8	FOX
May 17–May 23	American Idol 5/18	6.7	FOX
May 24–May 30	American Idol 5/26	8.2	FOX
May 31–June 6	2010 NBA Finals Game 2: Boston Celtics at Los Angeles Lakers	6.5	ABC
June 7–June 13	2010 NBA Finals Game 5: Los Angeles Lakers at Boston Celtics	7.2	ABC
June 14–June 20	2010 NBA Finals Game 7: Boston Celtics at Los Angeles Lakers	11.4	ABC
June 21–June 27	America's Got Talent 6/23	3.5	NBC
June 28–July 4	America's Got Talent 6/30	3.5	NBC
July 5–July 11	America's Got Talent 7/6	3.4	NBC
July 12–July 18	2010 Major League Baseball All-Star Game	3.8	FOX
July 19–July 25	The Bachelorette	3.4	ABC
July 26–August 1	Hell's Kitchen	2.9	FOX
August 2–August 8	2010 Pro Football Hall of Fame Game: Cincinnati Bengals vs. Dallas Cowboys	4.2	NBC
August 9–August 15	Hell's Kitchen	3.3	FOX
August 16–August 22	NFL Preseason Football: Minnesota Vikings at San Francisco 49ers	3.6	NBC
August 23–August 29	62nd Primetime Emmy Awards	4.1	NBC

== See also ==
- 2009–10 United States network television schedule (daytime)
- 2009–10 United States network television schedule (late night)
