= 2008–09 United States network television schedule =

The 2008–09 network television schedule for the six major English language commercial broadcast networks in the United States covers the prime time hours from September 2008 to August 2009. The schedule is followed by a list per network of returning series, new series, and series canceled after the 2007–08 season. The schedule omits the Public Broadcasting Service (whose programming is listed here).

NBC was the first to announce its fall schedule on April 2, 2008, followed by ABC and The CW on May 13, CBS on May 14, Fox on May 15, and MyNetworkTV on May 22. The CW unveiled its Sunday lineup on May 27, 2008.

PBS is not included; member stations have local flexibility over most of their schedules and broadcasts times for network shows may vary. Ion Television is also not included since the network's schedule consisted mainly of syndicated reruns and movies.

Each of the 30 highest-rated shows released in May 2009 is listed with its rank and rating as determined by Nielsen Media Research.

New series to broadcast television are highlighted in bold. Repeat airings or same-day rebroadcasts are indicated by (R).

All times are U.S. Eastern and Pacific Time (except for some live sports or events). Subtract one hour for Central, Mountain, Alaska, and Hawaii–Aleutian times.

All sporting events air live in all time zones in U.S. Eastern time, with local and/or late-night programming scheduled by affiliates after game completion.

== Legend ==
- Light blue indicates local programming.
- Gray indicates encore programming.
- Blue-gray indicates news programming.
- Light green indicates sporting events.
- Red indicates series being burned off and other irregularly scheduled programs, including specials and movies.
- Light gold indicates programming produced outside of the United States.
- Bronze indicates reairs of programming that originally aired on a cable channel or streaming service.
- highlight Yellow highlights indicates the top-10 most watched programs of the season.
- highlight Cyan highlights indicates numbers 11-20 most watched programs of the season.
- highlight Magenta highlights indicates numbers 21-30 most watched programs of the season.
- highlight Highlights indicates that it falls in multiple of the above categories.

== Sunday ==
Network		7:00 p.m.	7:30 p.m.	8:00 p.m.	8:30 p.m.	9:00 p.m.	9:30 p.m.	10:00 p.m.	10:30 p.m.
ABC	Fall	America's Funniest Home Videos		Extreme Makeover: Home Edition		Desperate Housewives (9/9.9)		Brothers & Sisters (23/7.2)	
ABC	Summer	America's Funniest Home Videos		Extreme Makeover: Home Edition		**Shark Tank**		**Defying Gravity**	
CBS	Fall	60 Minutes (14/8.9)		The Amazing Race		Cold Case (20/7.5) (Tied with The Bachelor)		The Unit	
CBS	Winter	60 Minutes (14/8.9)		Million Dollar Password		Cold Case (20/7.5) (Tied with The Bachelor)		The Unit	
CBS	Mid-winter	60 Minutes (14/8.9)		The Amazing Race		Cold Case (20/7.5) (Tied with The Bachelor)		The Unit	
CBS	Spring	60 Minutes (14/8.9)		Various programming		Cold Case (20/7.5) (Tied with The Bachelor)		Without a Trace (R)	
CBS	Summer	60 Minutes (14/8.9)		Big Brother		Cold Case (20/7.5) (Tied with The Bachelor)		Without a Trace (R)	
CBS	Mid-summer	60 Minutes (14/8.9)		Big Brother		**There Goes the Neighborhood**		Cold Case (R)	
The CW	Fall	**In Harm's Way**		**Valentine**		**Easy Money**		Local programming	
The CW	Late fall	Jericho (R) (Note: On select weeks when Jericho airs regular 60-minute episodes at 6:30 p.m., an additional episode of The CW Sunday Night Movie will air at 7:30 p.m. on top of its regular 8 p.m. airing.)		**The CW Sunday Night Movie**				Local programming	
The CW	Summer	**Valentine**		**The CW Sunday Night Movie**				Local programming	
The CW	Mid-summer	**Easy Money**		**The CW Sunday Night Movie**				Local programming	
Fox	Fall	Fox NFL (4:15 p.m.)	The OT	The Simpsons	King of the Hill	Family Guy	American Dad!	Local programming	
Fox	Winter	Are You Smarter than a 5th Grader?		The Simpsons	King of the Hill	Family Guy	American Dad!	Local programming	
Fox	Mid-winter	**Hole in the Wall**		The Simpsons	King of the Hill	Family Guy	American Dad!	Local programming	
Fox	Spring	American Dad! (R)	King of the Hill (R)	The Simpsons	King of the Hill	Family Guy	American Dad!	Local programming	
Fox	Mid-spring	American Dad! (R)	King of the Hill	The Simpsons	**Sit Down, Shut Up**	Family Guy	American Dad!	Local programming	
Fox	Late spring	**Sit Down, Shut Up**	American Dad! (R)	The Simpsons	King of the Hill	Family Guy	American Dad!	Local programming	
Fox	Summer	King of the Hill (R)	American Dad! (R)	The Simpsons	King of the Hill	Family Guy	American Dad!	Local programming	
Fox	Mid-summer	'Til Death (R)	American Dad! (R)	The Simpsons	King of the Hill	Family Guy	The Simpsons (R)	Local programming	
Fox	Late summer	'Til Death (R)	American Dad! (R)	The Simpsons	The Simpsons (R)	Family Guy	American Dad! (R)	Local programming	
NBC	Fall	Football Night in America		NBC Sunday Night Football (8:15 p.m.) (8/10.0)					
NBC	Winter	Dateline NBC				Special programming			
NBC	Late winter	Dateline NBC		**Kings**		The Apprentice			
NBC	Spring	Dateline NBC				The Apprentice			
NBC	Summer	Dateline NBC		**Merlin**		Law & Order: Criminal Intent (R)		Law & Order (R)	

Notes:

- On Sundays, The CW programming begins at 6:30 p.m. (EST).
- CBS' Sunday Night primetime lineup is often delayed due to NFL on CBS game coverage running longer than scheduled, except in the Pacific and Mountain time zones, where the lineup airs as scheduled.
- The 7 p.m. hour on Fox features animated series reruns in the Pacific and Mountain time zones during the NFL season.

== Monday ==
Network		8:00 p.m.	8:30 p.m.	9:00 p.m.	9:30 p.m.	10:00 p.m.	10:30 p.m.
ABC	Fall	Dancing with the Stars (3/12.9)			Samantha Who?	Boston Legal	
ABC	Winter	The Bachelor (20/7.5) (Tied with Cold Case)				**True Beauty**	
ABC	Spring	Dancing with the Stars (3/12.9)			**Surviving Suburbia**	**Castle** (25/6.9)	
ABC	Late spring	The Bachelorette				Here Come the Newlyweds	
ABC	Summer	The Bachelorette				**Dating in the Dark**	
CBS	Fall	The Big Bang Theory	How I Met Your Mother	Two and a Half Men (12/9.1) (Tied with CSI: Miami)	**Worst Week**	CSI: Miami (12/9.1) (Tied with Two and a Half Men)	
CBS	Winter	The Big Bang Theory	How I Met Your Mother	Two and a Half Men (12/9.1) (Tied with CSI: Miami)	Rules of Engagement (24/7.1)	CSI: Miami (12/9.1) (Tied with Two and a Half Men)	
CBS	Summer	How I Met Your Mother (R)	Rules of Engagement (R)	Two and a Half Men (12/9.1) (Tied with CSI: Miami)	The Big Bang Theory (R)	CSI: Miami (12/9.1) (Tied with Two and a Half Men)	
The CW	Fall	Gossip Girl		One Tree Hill		Local programming	
The CW	Summer	One Tree Hill (R)		Gossip Girl (R)		Local programming	
Fox	Fall	Terminator: The Sarah Connor Chronicles		Prison Break		Local programming	
Fox	Winter	House (17/8.1)		24 (22/7.3)		Local programming	
Fox	Spring	House (17/8.1)		**Lie to Me** (R)		Local programming	
MNT	Fall	Celebrity Exposé		**Magic's Biggest Secrets Finally Revealed**		Local programming	
MNT	Mid-fall	Twilight Zone (R)		**Magic's Biggest Secrets Finally Revealed**		Local programming	
MNT	Winter	Twilight Zone (R)		Masters of Illusion		Local programming	
MNT	Late winter	Twilight Zone (R)		**Magic's Biggest Secrets Finally Revealed**		Local programming	
MNT	Spring	Masters of Illusion (R)		**Magic's Biggest Secrets Finally Revealed**		Local programming	
MNT	Summer	Twilight Zone (R)		**Magic's Biggest Secrets Finally Revealed**		Local programming	
NBC	Early fall	Deal or No Deal		**America's Toughest Jobs**		Dateline NBC	
NBC	Fall	Chuck		Heroes		**My Own Worst Enemy**	
NBC	Winter	**Superstars of Dance**				**Momma's Boys**	
NBC	Mid-winter	Chuck		Heroes		Medium	
NBC	Spring	Deal or No Deal		Various programming		Medium	
NBC	Late spring	I'm a Celebrity...Get Me Out of Here!		Law & Order: Criminal Intent (R)		Dateline NBC	
NBC	Summer	**The Great American Road Trip**		Law & Order: Criminal Intent (R)		Dateline NBC	

== Tuesday ==
Network		8:00 p.m.	8:30 p.m.	9:00 p.m.	9:30 p.m.	10:00 p.m.	10:30 p.m.
ABC	Fall	**Opportunity Knocks**		Dancing with the Stars (7/10.7)		Eli Stone	
ABC	Mid-fall	Special programming		According to Jim		Eli Stone	
ABC	Winter	**Homeland Security USA**		Scrubs		Primetime: What Would You Do?	
ABC	Spring	According to Jim		Dancing with the Stars (7/10.7)		**Cupid**	
ABC	Summer	**The Superstars**		**Better Off Ted** (R)	Scrubs (R)	Primetime	
ABC	Mid-summer	Various programming		**Shaq Vs.**		Primetime	
CBS	Fall	NCIS (5/10.9)		**The Mentalist** (6/10.8)		Without a Trace (16/8.4)	
CBS	Spring	NCIS (5/10.9)		**The Mentalist** (6/10.8)		48 Hours (R)	
CBS	Summer	NCIS (5/10.9)		Big Brother		Medium (R)	
The CW	Fall	**90210**		**Privileged**		Local programming	
The CW	Winter	Reaper		**90210**		Local programming	
The CW	Spring	**90210** (R)		**Hitched or Ditched**		Local programming	
Fox	Fall	House (17/8.1)		**Fringe**		Local programming	
Fox	Winter	American Idol (2/14.6)		**Fringe**		Local programming	
Fox	Mid-winter	American Idol (2/14.6)				Local programming	
Fox	Spring	American Idol (2/14.6)		**Fringe**		Local programming	
Fox	Late spring	House (R)		**Mental**		Local programming	
Fox	Summer	Hell's Kitchen		**More to Love**		Local programming	
MNT	Fall	Street Patrol	Street Patrol (R)	JAIL	JAIL (R)	Local programming	
MNT	Winter	Street Patrol	Street Patrol (R)	**Vice Squad**	**Vice Squad** (R)	Local programming	
MNT	Late winter	Street Patrol		JAIL	JAIL (R)	Local programming	
NBC	Fall	The Biggest Loser				Law & Order: Special Victims Unit (26/6.7) (Tied with ER and Bones)	
NBC	Spring	I'm a Celebrity...Get Me Out of Here!		Law & Order: Criminal Intent (R)		Dateline NBC	
NBC	Summer	**The Great American Road Trip**		Law & Order: Criminal Intent (R)		Dateline NBC	

== Wednesday ==
Network		8:00 p.m.	8:30 p.m.	9:00 p.m.	9:30 p.m.	10:00 p.m.	10:30 p.m.
ABC	Fall	Pushing Daisies		Private Practice		Dirty Sexy Money	
ABC	Winter	Lost (R)		Lost (29/6.6) (Tied with Ghost Whisperer and Numb3rs)		**Life on Mars**	
ABC	Late winter	Scrubs	**Better Off Ted**	Lost (29/6.6) (Tied with Ghost Whisperer and Numb3rs)		**Life on Mars**	
ABC	Spring	Scrubs	**Better Off Ted**	Lost (29/6.6) (Tied with Ghost Whisperer and Numb3rs)		**The Unusuals**	
ABC	Late spring	Wipeout		I Survived a Japanese Game Show		Primetime	
CBS		The New Adventures of Old Christine	**Gary Unmarried**	Criminal Minds (11/9.4)		CSI: NY (15/8.6)	
The CW	Fall	America's Next Top Model		**Stylista**		Local programming	
The CW	Late fall	**Stylista** (R)		**Stylista**		Local programming	
The CW	Winter	**13: Fear is Real**		**90210** (R)		Local programming	
The CW	Mid-winter	**Privileged**		**90210** (R)		Local programming	
The CW	Late winter	America's Next Top Model		**90210** (R)		Local programming	
The CW	Spring	America's Next Top Model		**Hitched or Ditched** (R)		Local programming	
The CW	Summer	America's Next Top Model (R)				Local programming	
Fox	Fall	Bones (26/6.7) (Tied with Law & Order: Special Victims Unit and ER)		'Til Death	**Do Not Disturb**	Local programming	
Fox	Mid-fall	Bones (26/6.7) (Tied with Law & Order: Special Victims Unit and ER)		House (R)		Local programming	
Fox	Winter	American Idol (1/15.1)		**Lie to Me**		Local programming	
Fox	Late winter	**Lie to Me**		American Idol (1/15.1)		Local programming	
Fox	Spring	So You Think You Can Dance				Local programming	
MNT	Fall	**The World's Funniest Moments**		**The Tony Rock Project**	Under One Roof	Local programming	
MNT	Spring	**The World's Funniest Moments**		Comics Unleashed (R)		Local programming	
MNT	Late spring	**The World's Funniest Moments**		The Twilight Zone (R)		Local programming	
NBC	Fall	**Knight Rider**		Deal or No Deal		Lipstick Jungle	
NBC	Mid-fall	**Knight Rider**		Law & Order: Special Victims Unit (R)		Law & Order	
NBC	Winter	**Knight Rider**		Life		Law & Order	
NBC	Late winter	**The Chopping Block**		Life		Law & Order	
NBC	Spring	Law & Order (R)		Law & Order: Special Victims Unit (R)		Law & Order	
NBC	Late spring	I'm a Celebrity...Get Me Out of Here!				Law & Order	
NBC	Summer	America's Got Talent (R)		America's Got Talent		**The Philanthropist**	

== Thursday ==
Network		8:00 p.m.	8:30 p.m.	9:00 p.m.	9:30 p.m.	10:00 p.m.	10:30 p.m.
ABC	Fall	Ugly Betty		Grey's Anatomy (10/9.6)		**Life on Mars**	
ABC	Winter	Ugly Betty		Grey's Anatomy (10/9.6)		Private Practice	
ABC	Spring	**In the Motherhood**	Samantha Who?	Grey's Anatomy (10/9.6)		Private Practice	
ABC	Mid-spring	Ugly Betty		Grey's Anatomy (10/9.6)		Private Practice	
ABC	Summer	Samantha Who?		Grey's Anatomy (10/9.6)		Private Practice	
ABC	Mid-summer	Grey's Anatomy (R)				Private Practice	
CBS	Fall	Survivor: Gabon – Earth's Last Eden (18/7.8) (Tied with Eleventh Hour)		CSI: Crime Scene Investigation (4/11.5)		**Eleventh Hour** (18/7.8) (Tied with Survivor)	
CBS	Winter	Various programming		CSI: Crime Scene Investigation (4/11.5)		**Eleventh Hour** (18/7.8) (Tied with Survivor)	
CBS	Mid-winter	Survivor: Tocantins – The Brazilian Highlands (18/7.8) (Tied with Eleventh Hour)		CSI: Crime Scene Investigation (4/11.5)		**Eleventh Hour** (18/7.8) (Tied with Survivor)	
CBS	Spring	Survivor: Tocantins – The Brazilian Highlands (18/7.8) (Tied with Eleventh Hour)		CSI: Crime Scene Investigation (4/11.5)		**Harper's Island**	
CBS	Late spring	Survivor: Tocantins – The Brazilian Highlands (18/7.8) (Tied with Eleventh Hour)		CSI: Crime Scene Investigation (4/11.5)		Various programming	
CBS	Summer	Big Brother		CSI: Crime Scene Investigation (4/11.5)		**The Mentalist** (R)	
The CW	Fall	Smallville		Supernatural		Local programming	
The CW	Summer	Supernatural (R)				Local programming	
Fox	Fall	**Hole in the Wall**		Kitchen Nightmares		Local programming	
Fox	Mid-fall	Various programming		Kitchen Nightmares		Local programming	
Fox	Winter	Bones (26/6.7) (Tied with Law & Order: Special Victims Unit and ER)		Hell's Kitchen		Local programming	
Fox	Spring	Bones (26/6.7) (Tied with Law & Order: Special Victims Unit and ER)		So You Think You Can Dance		Local programming	
MNT		My Thursday Night Movie				Local programming	
NBC	Fall	My Name Is Earl	**Kath & Kim**	The Office	**Saturday Night**; **Live Weekend**; **Update Thursday**	ER (26/6.7) (Tied with Law & Order: Special Victims Unit and Bones)	
NBC	Mid-fall	My Name Is Earl	**Kath & Kim**	The Office	30 Rock	ER (26/6.7) (Tied with Law & Order: Special Victims Unit and Bones)	
NBC	Spring	My Name Is Earl	**Parks and Recreation**	The Office	30 Rock	**Southland**	
NBC	Summer	I'm a Celebrity...Get Me Out of Here!		The Office	30 Rock	**The Listener**	
NBC	Mid-summer	30 Rock (R)	The Office (R)	The Office	30 Rock	**The Listener**	
NBC	Late summer	30 Rock (R)	**Parks and Recreation** (R)	The Office	30 Rock	Law & Order (R)	

Notes:

- The Moment of Truth was originally scheduled to air Thursdays at 8:00 on Fox, but was instead shelved, effectively canceling it.

== Friday ==
Network		8:00 p.m.	8:30 p.m.	9:00 p.m.	9:30 p.m.	10:00 p.m.	10:30 p.m.
ABC	Fall	Wife Swap		Supernanny		20/20	
ABC	Spring	**Surviving Suburbia**	**The Goode Family**	According to Jim (R)		20/20	
ABC	Summer	Supernanny (R)		Ugly Betty (R)		20/20	
CBS	Fall	Ghost Whisperer (29/6.6) (Tied with Lost and Numb3rs)		**The Ex List**		Numb3rs (29/6.6) (Tied with Ghost Whisperer and Lost)	
CBS	Mid-fall	Ghost Whisperer (29/6.6) (Tied with Lost and Numb3rs)		Various programming		Numb3rs (29/6.6) (Tied with Ghost Whisperer and Lost)	
CBS	Winter	Ghost Whisperer (29/6.6) (Tied with Lost and Numb3rs)		Flashpoint		Numb3rs (29/6.6) (Tied with Ghost Whisperer and Lost)	
The CW	Fall	Everybody Hates Chris	The Game	America's Next Top Model (R)		Local programming	
The CW	Winter	Everybody Hates Chris	The Game	Everybody Hates Chris (R)	The Game (R)	Local programming	
The CW	Mid-winter	Everybody Hates Chris	The Game	**13: Fear Is Real**		Local programming	
The CW	Late winter	Everybody Hates Chris	The Game	America's Next Top Model (R)		Local programming	
The CW	Spring	**Privileged** (R)		Everybody Hates Chris (R)	The Game (R)	Local programming	
Fox	Fall	Are You Smarter than a 5th Grader?		Don't Forget the Lyrics!		Local programming	
Fox	Winter	Terminator: The Sarah Connor Chronicles		**Dollhouse**		Local programming	
Fox	Spring	Prison Break		**Dollhouse**		Local programming	
Fox	Late spring	Don't Forget the Lyrics!		House (R)		Local programming	
Fox	Summer	Are You Smarter than a 5th Grader?		**Mental**		Local programming	
MNT		WWE Friday Night SmackDown				Local programming	
NBC	Fall	**America's Toughest Jobs**		Various programming		Life	
NBC	Mid-fall	Deal or No Deal		**Crusoe**		Lipstick Jungle	
NBC	Late fall	Deal or No Deal		Lipstick Jungle		Dateline NBC	
NBC	Winter	**Howie Do It**		Friday Night Lights (R)		Dateline NBC	
NBC	Spring	**Howie Do It**		Dateline NBC			
NBC	Late spring	**The Chopping Block**		Dateline NBC			
NBC	Summer	**Southland** (R)		Dateline NBC			

== Saturday ==
Network		8:00 p.m.	8:30 p.m.	9:00 p.m.	9:30 p.m.	10:00 p.m.	10:30 p.m.
ABC	Fall	Saturday Night Football (continued to game completion)					
ABC	Late fall	Various programming					
ABC	Spring	ABC Saturday Movie of the Week					
ABC	Late spring	ABC Saturday Movie of the Week				Pushing Daisies	
ABC	Early summer	Wipeout (R)		Castle (R)		Eli Stone	
ABC	Summer	Wipeout (R)		Castle (R)		Dirty Sexy Money	
ABC	Mid-summer	Various programming					
CBS	Fall	Crimetime Saturday				48 Hours	
CBS	Winter	**Game Show in My Head**		Crimetime Saturday		48 Hours	
CBS	Mid-winter	Crimetime Saturday				48 Hours	
CBS	Spring	Crimetime Saturday		**Harper's Island**		48 Hours	
CBS	Summer	Crimetime Saturday				48 Hours	
Fox	Fall	COPS	COPS (R)	America's Most Wanted		Local programming	
Fox	Spring	COPS (R)	COPS	America's Most Wanted		Local programming	
MNT		My Saturday Night Movie				Local programming	
NBC	Fall	Various programming		**Knight Rider** (R)		Law & Order: Special Victims Unit (R)	
NBC	Mid-fall	**Knight Rider** (R)		Various programming		Law & Order: Special Victims Unit (R)	
NBC	Late fall	**Crusoe**		Various programming		Law & Order: Special Victims Unit (R)	
NBC	Winter	Law & Order: Criminal Intent (R)		Law & Order: Special Victims Unit (R)		Law & Order (R)	
NBC	Spring	Law & Order: Special Victims Unit (R)		**Southland** (R)		Law & Order (R)	
NBC	Late spring	**Kings**		Law & Order (R)		Law & Order: Special Victims Unit (R)	
NBC	Summer	Law & Order: Criminal Intent (R)		Law & Order (R)		Law & Order: Special Victims Unit (R)	

== By network ==
=== ABC ===
Returning series:

- 20/20
- ABC Saturday Movie of the Week
- According to Jim
- America's Funniest Home Videos
- The Bachelor
- The Bachelorette
- Boston Legal
- Brothers & Sisters
- Dancing with the Stars
- Desperate Housewives
- Dirty Sexy Money
- Eli Stone
- Extreme Makeover: Home Edition
- Grey's Anatomy
- Here Come the Newlyweds
- I Survived a Japanese Game Show
- Just for Laughs
- Lost
- Primetime
- Primetime: What Would You Do?
- Private Practice
- Pushing Daisies
- Samantha Who?
- Saturday Night Football
- Scrubs (moved from NBC)
- Supernanny
- Ugly Betty
- Wife Swap
- Wipeout

New series:

- **Better Off Ted** *
- **Castle** *
- **Crash Course** *
- **Cupid** *
- **Dating in the Dark** *
- **Defying Gravity** *
- **The Goode Family** *
- **Homeland Security USA** *
- **Life on Mars**
- **Opportunity Knocks**
- **Shaq Vs.** *
- **Shark Tank** *
- **The Superstars** *
- **Surviving Suburbia** *
- **True Beauty** *
- **The Unusuals** *

Not returning from 2007–08:

- The ABC Friday Night Movie
- Big Shots
- Carpoolers
- Cashmere Mafia
- Cavemen
- Dance Machine
- Dance War: Bruno vs. Carrie Ann
- Duel
- High School Musical: Get in the Picture
- Hopkins
- Men in Trees
- Miss Guided
- The Mole
- Notes from the Underbelly
- October Road
- Oprah's Big Give
- Wanna Bet?
- Women's Murder Club
- The Wonderful World of Disney (returned for 2019–20)

=== CBS ===
Returning series:

- 48 Hours
- 60 Minutes
- The Amazing Race
- The Big Bang Theory
- Big Brother
- Cold Case
- Criminal Minds
- CSI: Crime Scene Investigation
- CSI: Miami
- CSI: NY
- Flashpoint
- Ghost Whisperer
- How I Met Your Mother
- Million Dollar Password
- NCIS
- The New Adventures of Old Christine
- Numb3rs
- Rules of Engagement
- Survivor
- Two and a Half Men
- The Unit
- Without a Trace

New series:

- **Eleventh Hour**
- **Elite XC Saturday Night Fights**
- **The Ex List**
- **Game Show in My Head** *
- **Gary Unmarried**
- **Harper's Island** *
- **The Mentalist**
- **There Goes the Neighborhood** *
- **Worst Week**

Not returning from 2007–08:

- Cane
- Jericho (reruns to broadcast on The CW, from late 2008)
- Kid Nation
- Moonlight
- Power of 10
- Secret Talents of the Stars
- Shark
- Swingtown
- Viva Laughlin
- Welcome to The Captain

=== The CW ===
Returning series:

- America's Next Top Model
- Everybody Hates Chris
- The Game
- Gossip Girl
- Jericho (reruns) (Note: A CBS original series; airs repeats.)
- One Tree Hill
- Reaper
- Smallville
- Supernatural

New series:

- **13: Fear is Real** *
- **90210**
- **The CW Sunday Night Movie**
- **Easy Money**
- **Hitched or Ditched** *
- **In Harm's Way**
- **Privileged**
- **Stylista**
- **Valentine**

Not returning from 2007–08:

- Aliens in America
- Beauty and the Geek
- Crowned: The Mother of All Pageants
- CW Now
- Farmer Wants a Wife (moved to Fox in 2022–23)
- Girlfriends
- Life Is Wild
- Online Nation
- Pussycat Dolls Present: Girlicious
- WWE SmackDown (moved to MyNetworkTV)

=== Fox ===
Returning series:

- 24
- America's Most Wanted
- American Dad!
- American Idol
- Are You Smarter than a 5th Grader?
- Bones
- Cops
- Don't Forget the Lyrics!
- Family Guy
- Hell's Kitchen
- House
- King of the Hill
- Kitchen Nightmares
- NFL on Fox
- The OT
- Prison Break
- The Simpsons
- So You Think You Can Dance
- Terminator: The Sarah Connor Chronicles
- 'Til Death

New series:

- **Dollhouse** *
- **Do Not Disturb**
- **Fringe**
- **Hole in the Wall**
- **Lie to Me**
- **Mental** *
- **More to Love** *
- **Osbournes Reloaded** *
- **Secret Millionaire**
- **Sit Down, Shut Up** *

Not returning from 2007–08:

- Back to You
- Canterbury's Law
- Fox Friday Night Movie
- K-Ville
- The Moment of Truth
- Nashville
- New Amsterdam
- The Next Great American Band
- The Return of Jezebel James
- Unhitched

=== MyNetworkTV ===
Returning series:

- Magic's Biggest Secrets Revealed
- Celebrity Exposé
- Jail
- Masters of Illusion
- My Thursday Night Movie
- My Saturday Night Movie
- Street Patrol
- Under One Roof
- WWE SmackDown (moved from The CW)

New series:

- **Dead Man Running**
- **The Tony Rock Project**
- **Vice Squad**
- **The World's Funniest Moments**

Not returning from 2007–08:

- The Academy
- The Best of In Living Color
- Control Room Presents
- Decision House
- IFL Battleground
- Meet My Folks
- My Friday Night Movie
- NFL Total Access
- Paradise Hotel 2
- Whacked Out Videos

=== NBC ===
Returning series:

- 30 Rock
- America's Got Talent
- The Celebrity Apprentice 2
- The Biggest Loser
- Chuck
- Dateline NBC
- Deal or No Deal
- ER
- Football Night in America
- Heroes
- I'm a Celebrity...Get Me Out of Here!
- Law & Order
- Law & Order: Criminal Intent (reruns) (Note: A USA Network original series; airs repeats; previously aired on NBC from 2001 to 2007.)
- Law & Order: Special Victims Unit
- Life
- Lipstick Jungle
- Medium
- My Name Is Earl
- NBC Sunday Night Football
- The Office

New series:

- **America's Toughest Jobs**
- **The Chopping Block** *
- **Crusoe**
- **The Great American Road Trip** *
- **Howie Do It**
- **Kath & Kim**
- **Kings** *
- **Knight Rider**
- **The Listener** *
- **Merlin** *
- **Momma's Boys**
- **My Own Worst Enemy**
- **Parks and Recreation** *
- **The Philanthropist** *
- **Saturday Night Live Weekend Update Thursday**
- **Southland** *
- **Superstars of Dance** *

Not returning from 2007–08:

- 1 vs. 100 (moved to GSN)
- American Gladiators
- Amnesia
- The Baby Borrowers
- Bionic Woman
- Celebrity Circus
- Celebrity Family Feud (moved to ABC in 2014–15)
- Clash of the Choirs
- Fear Itself
- Friday Night Lights (moved to The 101 Network)
- Journeyman
- Last Comic Standing
- Las Vegas
- Most Outrageous Moments
- My Dad Is Better Than Your Dad
- Nashville Star
- Phenomenon
- Quarterlife
- Scrubs (moved to ABC)
- The Singing Bee (moved to CMT)

== Renewals and cancellations ==
=== Full-season pickups ===
==== ABC ====
- Private Practice—On October 22, 2008, it was picked up for a full-season order.
- Samantha Who?—On October 31, 2008, it received a full-season order, adding seven episodes.

==== CBS ====
- Gary Unmarried—On November 14, 2008, it was picked up for a full 22-episode season.
- The Mentalist—On October 15, 2008, it was picked up for a full-season order.

==== The CW ====
- 90210—On September 22, 2008, it was picked up for a full-season order.

==== Fox ====
- Fringe—On October 1, 2008, it was picked up for a full-season order.
- Terminator: The Sarah Connor Chronicles—On October 17, 2008, it was picked up for a full-season order, despite its declining ratings this season.
- 'Til Death—Despite lower ratings, Fox ordered a fourth season of the show.

==== MyNetworkTV ====
- WWE SmackDown—The only program to carry over in the network's conversion to a programming service.

==== NBC ====
- Chuck—On August 28, 2008, it was picked up for a full-season order, one month before the new season even premiered.
- Knight Rider—On October 21, 2008, it was picked up for a full-season order, then on December 3, 2008, NBC cut the order down to 17.
- Kath & Kim—On October 31, 2008, was given a full-season order.
- Life—On November 7, 2008, NBC picked up Life for a full season.
- Howie Do It—Twelve additional episodes were ordered by NBC.

=== Renewals ===
==== ABC ====
- America's Funniest Home Videos—Renewed for twentieth season on April 23, 2009.
- Brothers & Sisters—Renewed for a fourth season on April 23, 2009.
- Castle—Renewed for a second season on May 15, 2009.
- Desperate Housewives—Renewed for a sixth season on April 23, 2009.
- Grey's Anatomy—Renewed for a sixth season on April 23, 2009.
- Private Practice—Renewed for a third season on April 23. 2009.
- Scrubs—Renewed for a ninth season on April 23, 2009.
- Shark Tank—Renewed for a second season in August 2009.

==== CBS ====
- The Amazing Race—Renewed for a fifteenth season on April 17, 2009.
- The Big Bang Theory—Renewed for a third and fourth season on March 18, 2009.
- Cold Case—Renewed for a seventh season.
- Criminal Minds—Renewed for a fifth season.
- CSI: Crime Scene Investigation—Renewed for a tenth season.
- CSI: Miami—Renewed for an eighth season.
- CSI: NY—Renewed for a sixth season.
- How I Met Your Mother—Renewed for a fifth season.
- Gary Unmarried—Renewed for a second season.
- Ghost Whisperer—Renewed for a fifth season on March 13, 2009.
- The Mentalist—Renewed for a second season.
- NCIS—Renewed for a seventh season.
- The New Adventures of Old Christine—Renewed for a fifth season.
- Numb3rs—Renewed for a sixth season.
- Rules of Engagement—Renewed for a fourth season.
- Survivor—Renewed for a nineteenth and twentieth season on March 1, 2009.
- Two and a Half Men—Renewed for a seventh, eighth and ninth season on March 18, 2009.

==== The CW ====
- 90210—Renewed for a second and third season on February 24, 2009.
- Gossip Girl—Renewed for a fourth season on February 24, 2009.
- One Tree Hill—Renewed for a seventh season on February 24, 2009.
- Smallville—Renewed for a ninth season.
- Supernatural—Renewed for a fifth season on February 24, 2009.

==== Fox ====
- 24—Renewed for an eighth and final season on May 16, 2007.
- American Dad!—Renewed for a fifth and sixth season on October 30, 2008.
- Bones—Renewed for a fifth and sixth season on May 16, 2009.
- Dollhouse—Renewed for a second season on May 15, 2009.
- Family Guy—Renewed for an eighth season on May 5, 2008.
- Fringe – Renewed for a second season on April 26, 2009.
- House—Renewed for a sixth season.
- Lie to Me—Renewed for a second season on May 13, 2009.
- Kitchen Nightmares—Renewed for third season on March 22, 2009.
- The Simpsons—Renewed for a twenty-first and twenty-second season on February 26, 2009.
- So You Think You Can Dance—Renewed for a sixth and seventh season on May 15, 2009.
- 'Til Death—Renewed for a fourth season on January 9, 2009.

==== NBC ====
- 30 Rock—Renewed for a fourth season on January 15, 2009.
- The Apprentice—Renewed for a ninth season.
- Chuck—Renewed for a third season on May 17, 2009.
- Heroes—Renewed for a fourth season on March 5, 2008.
- Law & Order—Renewed for a twentieth season.
- Law & Order: Special Victims Unit—Renewed for an eleventh season on April 3, 2009.
- The Office—Renewed for a sixth season on January 15, 2009.
- Parks and Recreation—Renewed for a second season.

=== Cancellations/Series endings ===
==== ABC ====
- According to Jim—Canceled on May 19, 2009, after eight seasons. The series concluded on June 2, 2009.
- Boston Legal—It was announced on May 13, 2008 that season five would be the final season. The series concluded on December 8, 2008.
- Cupid —Canceled on May 18, 2009.
- Defying Gravity—Canceled on October 29, 2009.
- Dirty Sexy Money—Canceled on November 20, 2008 six episodes into the second season.
- Eli Stone—Canceled on November 20, 2008 five episodes into the second season.
- The Goode Family—Canceled on August 8, 2009.
- Homeland Security USA—Canceled on May 19, 2009.
- In the Motherhood—Canceled on May 15, 2009.
- Just for Laughs—Canceled on April 7, 2010, after three seasons.
- Life on Mars—Canceled on March 3, 2009. The series concluded on April 1, 2009.
- Opportunity Knocks—Canceled on October 16, 2008.
- Pushing Daisies—Canceled on November 20, 2008 six episodes into the second season.
- Samantha Who?—Canceled on May 18, 2009, after two seasons.
- Surviving Suburbia—Canceled on August 8, 2009.
- The Unusuals—Canceled on May 17, 2009.

==== CBS ====
- Eleventh Hour – Canceled on May 19, 2009.
- Elite XC Saturday Night Fights – On October 20, Elite XC shut down operations, thus cancelling the show.
- The Ex List – This was the first new drama of the season cancelled. The series was replaced with repeats of CBS dramas and new episodes of The Price Is Right Primetime.
- Game Show in My Head – Due to declining ratings, CBS decided not to air any more episodes.
- Harper's Island Cancelled on July 14, 2009.
- Million Dollar Password – Canceled due to declining ratings.
- The Unit – Canceled on May 19, 2009, after four seasons.
- Worst Week – Canceled on May 20, 2009.
- Without a Trace – Canceled on May 19, 2009, after seven seasons.

==== The CW ====
- 13: Fear Is Real—Canceled on May 21, 2009.
- Easy Money—MRC canceled the series on November 16, 2008.
- Everybody Hates Chris—Chris Rock chose to end the series after four seasons.
- The Game—Canceled on May 20, 2009. Moved to BET in January 2011.
- In Harm's Way—The CW decided to get end the MRC Sunday night on November 23, 2008, effectively canceling the show.
- Privileged—Canceled on May 19, 2009.
- Reaper—Canceled on May 20, 2009, after two seasons.
- Stylista—Canceled on May 21, 2009.
- Valentine—Canceled on November 23, 2008.

==== Fox ====
- Are You Smarter than a 5th Grader?—It was announced on August 4, 2009, that the series would move to syndication. On November 6, 2014, it was announced that the series would return for a fourth season.
- Do Not Disturb—Canceled on September 25, 2008, marking the first cancellation of the season.
- Don't Forget the Lyrics!—Canceled on August 3, 2009, after two seasons. On January 25, 2010, it was announced that the series would move to syndication. On April 28, 2021, it was announced that the series would return for a third season.
- Hole in the Wall—Pulled from the schedule and canceled on May 18, 2009, due to poor ratings. On July 20, 2010, It was announced that Cartoon Network would pick up the series for another season.
- King of the Hill—It was announced on October 30, 2008, that season thirteen would be the final season. The series concluded on September 13, 2009. The last four episodes were aired on syndication on May 3 to 6, 2010. On January 31, 2023, it was announced that a revival on Hulu was officially confirmed to be ordered.
- Mental—Canceled on March 9, 2010.
- More to Love—Canceled on March 9, 2010.
- Osbournes Reloaded—Canceled on May 18, 2009.
- Prison Break—It was announced on January 13, 2009, that season four would be the final season. The series concluded on May 15, 2009. On January 15, 2016, it was announced that the series would return for a fifth season.
- Secret Millionaire—Canceled on May 18, 2009. On September 10, 2009, it was announced that ABC would pick up the series for another season.
- Sit Down, Shut Up—Pulled from the schedule and canceled on May 18, 2009. The remaining nine episodes aired on Saturdays at midnight from later in the year.
- Terminator: The Sarah Connor Chronicles—Canceled on May 18, 2009, after two seasons.

==== MyNetworkTV ====
The entire schedule of programs for MyNetworkTV except for WWE SmackDown did not pass on to the 2009/10 season due to the network's conversion to a programming service.

- Celebrity Exposé
- Comics Unleashed (syndicated program on MyNetworkTV's schedule)
- Jail
- Magic's Biggest Secrets Revealed
- Masters of Illusion
- My Saturday Night Movie (the network's time on Saturday nights was given back to local affiliates for their own purposes)
- Street Patrol
- The Tony Rock Project
- The Twilight Zone (repeats of 2002 UPN series)
- Under One Roof
- Vice Squad
- World's Funniest Moments

==== NBC ====
- America's Toughest Jobs—Canceled on March 13, 2009.
- The Chopping Block—Canceled on March 26, 2009.
- Crusoe—The series concluded on January 31, 2009.
- Deal or No Deal—Canceled on May 19, 2009. The syndicated version of the show got picked up by MyNetworkTV when it transitioned to a programming service.
- ER—It was announced on April 2, 2008 that season fifteen would be the final season. The series concluded on April 2, 2009.
- Howie Do It—Canceled on May 19, 2009.
- Kath & Kim—Canceled on May 19, 2009.
- Kings—Canceled on April 21, 2009.
- Knight Rider—Canceled on May 19, 2009.
- Life—Canceled on May 4, 2009, after two seasons.
- Lipstick Jungle—Canceled on March 28, 2009, after two seasons.
- The Listener—Pulled from the schedule on July 23, 2009, after 8 episodes.
- Medium—It was announced on May 19, 2009 that Medium will be moving to CBS next season.
- Merlin—Canceled during the summer due to declining ratings.
- Momma's Boys—Canceled on March 13, 2009.
- My Name Is Earl—Canceled on May 19, 2009, after four seasons.
- My Own Worst Enemy—Canceled on November 12, 2008. The series concluded on December 15, 2008.
- The Philanthropist—Canceled on October 20, 2009.
- Superstars of Dance—Canceled on May 19, 2009.

== See also ==
- 2008–09 Canadian network television schedule
- 2008–09 United States network television schedule (late night)
- 2008–09 United States network television schedule (overnight)

== Top weekly ratings ==
- Data sources: AC Nielsen, TV by the Numbers

=== Total Viewers ===
Week	Name	Viewers (in millions)	Network
August 25-August 31	America's Got Talent 9/1	11.12	NBC
September 1-September 7	Sunday Night Football: Chicago Bears at Indianapolis Colts	18.35	NBC
September 8-September 14	Sunday Night Football: Pittsburgh Steelers at Cleveland Browns	17.83	NBC
September 15-September 21	Sunday Night Football: Dallas Cowboys at Green Bay Packers	22.23	NBC
September 22-September 28	Dancing with the Stars 9/22	21.34	ABC
September 29-October 5	Dancing with the Stars 9/29	18.88	ABC
October 6-October 12	CSI	23.49	CBS
October 13-October 19	CSI	19.28	CBS
October 20-October 26	CSI	19.49	CBS
October 27-November 2	2008 World Series Game 5: Tampa Bay Rays at Philadelphia Phillies (conclusion)	19.84	FOX
November 3-November 9	60 Minutes	18.47	CBS
November 10-November 16	60 Minutes	25.10	CBS
November 17-November 23	Dancing with the Stars 11/17	19.63	ABC
November 24-November 30	Dancing with the Stars 11/24	21.10	ABC
December 1-December 7	The Mentalist	18.74	CBS
December 8-December 14	Sunday Night Football: New York Giants at Dallas Cowboys	23.05	NBC
December 15-December 21	NCIS (Repeat)	19.94	CBS
December 22-December 28	Sunday Night Football: Denver Broncos at San Diego Chargers	14.85	NBC
December 29-January 4	AFC Wild Card Playoff: Indianapolis Colts at San Diego Chargers	27.79	NBC
January 5-January 11	2009 BCS National Championship Game: Florida vs. Oklahoma	26.77	FOX
January 12-January 18	AFC Championship Game: Baltimore Ravens at Pittsburgh Steelers	40.65	CBS
January 19-January 25	American Idol 1/21	25.90	FOX
January 26-February 1	Super Bowl XLIII: Pittsburgh Steelers vs. Arizona Cardinals	98.73	NBC
February 2-February 8	American Idol 2/3	26.60	FOX
February 9-February 15	American Idol 2/10	24.94	FOX
February 16-February 22	81st Academy Awards	36.31	ABC
February 23-March 1	American Idol 2/25	24.54	FOX
March 2-March 8	American Idol 3/3	24.31	FOX
March 9-March 15	American Idol 3/10	25.77	FOX
March 16-March 22	American Idol 3/18	23.71	FOX
March 23-March 29	American Idol 3/25	26.03	FOX
March 30-April 5	American Idol 3/31	24.41	FOX
April 6-April 12	American Idol 4/8	22.98	FOX
April 13-April 19	American Idol 4/14	24.38	FOX
April 20-April 26	American Idol 4/21	23.96	FOX
April 27-May 3	American Idol 4/28	23.26	FOX
May 4-May 10	American Idol 5/6	23.57	FOX
May 11-May 17	American Idol 5/13	24.67	FOX
May 18-May 24	American Idol 5/20	28.84	FOX
May 25-May 31	NCIS (Repeat)	12.46	CBS
June 1-June 7	2009 NBA Finals Game 2: Orlando Magic at Los Angeles Lakers	14.06	ABC
June 8-June 14	2009 NBA Finals Game 4: Los Angeles Lakers at Orlando Magic	15.96	ABC
June 15-June 21	NCIS (Repeat)	10.39	CBS
June 22-June 28	America's Got Talent 6/23	11.46	NBC
June 29-July 5	America's Got Talent 6/30	13.15	NBC
July 6-July 12	America's Got Talent 7/8	11.91	NBC
July 13-July 19	2009 Major League Baseball All-Star Game	14.59	FOX
July 20-July 26	America's Got Talent 7/21	13.75	NBC
July 27-August 2	America's Got Talent 7/28	13.25	NBC
August 3-August 9	America's Got Talent 8/4	12.96	NBC
August 10-August 16	America's Got Talent 8/11	12.88	NBC
August 17-August 23	America's Got Talent 8/18	11.88	NBC
August 24-August 30	America's Got Talent 8/25	11.46	NBC

=== 18-49 Viewers ===
Week	Name	Viewers (in millions)	Network
August 25-August 31	America's Got Talent 9/1	3.1	NBC
September 1-September 7	Sunday Night Football: Chicago Bears at Indianapolis Colts	7.4	NBC
September 8-September 14	Sunday Night Football: Pittsburgh Steelers at Cleveland Browns	7.2	NBC
September 15-September 21	Sunday Night Football: Dallas Cowboys at Green Bay Packers	9.0	NBC
September 22-September 28	Grey's Anatomy	7.4	ABC
September 29-October 5	Desperate Housewives	5.9	ABC
October 6-October 12	CSI	7.1	CBS
October 13-October 19	Grey's Anatomy	5.9	ABC
October 20-October 26	Desperate Housewives	5.8	ABC
October 27-November 2	2008 World Series Game 5: Tampa Bay Rays at Philadelphia Phillies (conclusion)	6.2	FOX
November 3-November 9	Sunday Night Football: New York Giants at Philadelphia Eagles	6.7	NBC
November 10-November 16	Sunday Night Football: Dallas Cowboys at Washington Redskins	7.4	NBC
November 17-November 23	Grey's Anatomy	6.2	ABC
November 24-November 30	Sunday Night Football: Chicago Bears at Minnesota Vikings	6.1	NBC
December 1-December 7	The OT	6.3	FOX
December 8-December 14	Sunday Night Football: New York Giants at Dallas Cowboys	8.6	NBC
December 15-December 21	Sunday Night Football: Carolina Panthers at New York Giants	6.8	NBC
December 22-December 28	Sunday Night Football: Denver Broncos at San Diego Chargers	5.4	NBC
December 29-January 4	AFC Wild Card Playoff: Indianapolis Colts at San Diego Chargers	10.0	NBC
January 5-January 11	2009 BCS National Championship Game: Florida vs. Oklahoma	9.5	FOX
January 12-January 18	AFC Championship Game: Baltimore Ravens at Pittsburgh Steelers	14.7	CBS
January 19-January 25	American Idol 1/21	9.2	FOX
January 26-February 1	Super Bowl XLIII: Pittsburgh Steelers vs. Arizona Cardinals	36.7	NBC
February 2-February 8	American Idol 2/3	10.0	FOX
February 9-February 15	American Idol 2/11	9.5	FOX
February 16-February 22	81st Academy Awards	12.1	ABC
February 23-March 1	American Idol 2/25	9.1	FOX
March 2-March 8	American Idol 3/3	9.0	FOX
March 9-March 15	American Idol 3/10	9.5	FOX
March 16-March 22	American Idol 3/18	8.7	FOX
March 23-March 29	American Idol 3/25	9.3	FOX
March 30-April 5	American Idol 3/31	8.9	FOX
April 6-April 12	American Idol 4/7	8.1	FOX
April 13-April 19	American Idol 4/14	8.5	FOX
April 20-April 26	American Idol 4/22	8.3	FOX
April 27-May 3	American Idol 4/28	8.1	FOX
May 4-May 10	American Idol 5/5	8.3	FOX
May 11-May 17	American Idol 5/13	8.7	FOX
May 18-May 24	American Idol 5/20	10.0	FOX
May 25-May 31	So You Think You Can Dance 5/28	3.6	FOX
June 1-June 7	2009 NBA Finals Game 2: Orlando Magic at Los Angeles Lakers	5.8	ABC
June 8-June 14	2009 NBA Finals Game 4: Los Angeles Lakers at Orlando Magic	6.4	ABC
June 15-June 21	So You Think You Can Dance 6/17	3.1	FOX
June 22-June 28	America's Got Talent 6/23	3.2	NBC
June 29-July 5	America's Got Talent 6/30	3.7	NBC
July 6-July 12	America's Got Talent 7/8	3.3	NBC
July 13-July 19	2009 Major League Baseball All-Star Game	4.7	FOX
July 20-July 26	America's Got Talent 7/21	3.4	NBC
July 27-August 2	America's Got Talent 7/28	3.5	NBC
August 3-August 9	America's Got Talent 8/4	3.6	NBC
August 10-August 16	America's Got Talent 8/11	3.6	NBC
August 17-August 23	Hell's Kitchen	3.5	FOX
August 24-August 30	Hell's Kitchen	3.6	FOX
