= Top-rated United States television programs of 2008–09 =

This table displays the top-rated primetime television series of the 2008–09 season as measured by Nielsen Media Research.

Rank	Program	Network	Rating
1	American Idol — Wednesday	FOX	15.1
2	American Idol — Tuesday	FOX	14.6
3	Dancing with the Stars — Monday	ABC	12.9
4	CSI: Crime Scene Investigation	CBS	11.5
5	NCIS	CBS	10.9
6	The Mentalist	CBS	10.8
7	Dancing with the Stars — Tuesday	ABC	10.7
8	Sunday Night Football	NBC	10.0
9	Desperate Housewives	ABC	9.9
10	Grey's Anatomy	ABC	9.6
11	Criminal Minds	CBS	9.4
12	Two and a Half Men	CBS	9.1
12	CSI: Miami	CBS	9.1
14	60 Minutes	CBS	8.9
15	CSI: NY	CBS	8.6
16	Without a Trace	CBS	8.4
17	House	FOX	8.1
18	Survivor	CBS	7.8
18	Eleventh Hour	CBS	7.8
20	Cold Case	CBS	7.5
20	The Bachelor	ABC	7.5
22	24	FOX	7.3
23	Brothers & Sisters	ABC	7.2
24	Rules of Engagement	CBS	7.1
25	Castle	ABC	6.9
26	Law & Order: Special Victims Unit	NBC	6.7
26	ER	NBC	6.7
26	Bones	FOX	6.7
29	Ghost Whisperer	CBS	6.6
29	Lost	ABC	6.6
29	NUMB3RS	CBS	6.6
