= Top-rated United States television programs of 2009–10 =

This table displays the top-rated primetime television series of the 2009–10 season as measured by Nielsen Media Research.

Rank	Program	Network	Rating
1	American Idol — Tuesday	FOX	13.7
2	American Idol — Wednesday	FOX	13.3
3	Dancing with the Stars	ABC	12.6
4	NCIS	CBS	11.5
5	Sunday Night Football	NBC	11.3
6	The Mentalist	CBS	10.6
7	Dancing with the Stars — Results	ABC	9.9
8	NCIS: Los Angeles	CBS	9.8
8	Undercover Boss	CBS	9.8
10	CSI: Crime Scene Investigation	CBS	9.7
11	Grey's Anatomy	ABC	9.0
12	Two and a Half Men	CBS	8.9
13	Desperate Housewives	ABC	8.8
14	The Big Bang Theory	CBS	8.5
14	Criminal Minds	CBS	8.5
14	The Good Wife	CBS	8.5
17	60 Minutes	CBS	8.4
18	CSI: Miami	CBS	8.1
19	CSI: NY	CBS	7.9
19	Survivor	CBS	7.9
21	The Bachelor	ABC	7.8
22	House	FOX	7.5
23	Brothers & Sisters	ABC	7.0
24	Castle	ABC	6.9
24	Lost	ABC	6.9
26	The Amazing Race	CBS	6.6
27	Bones	FOX	6.5
28	24	FOX	6.4
29	Cold Case	CBS	6.3
29	Private Practice	ABC	6.3
