= The Chopping Block =

2008 Australian reality TV series

- Genre: Reality
- Presented by: Matt Moran; Catriona Rowntree
- Country of origin: Australia
- Original language: English
- No. of seasons: 2
- No. of episodes: 16

Production
- Producers: David Barbour; Julian Cress
- Running time: 60 minutes (including commercials)

Original release
- Network: Nine Network
- Release: 6 February – 2 December 2008

Related
- The Chopping Block (American TV series)

The Chopping Block is an Australian reality television series which began airing on the Nine Network on 6 February 2008. Produced by Granada Productions, it was hosted by chef Matt Moran. Catriona Rowntree co-hosted the show with Moran in its first season. It ran for two series of 8 episodes each.

== Format ==
Each week two Melbourne and Sydney restaurants were reviewed by a secret critic (ABC Radio National broadcaster and food critic Alan Saunders) and given A$5,000. With assistance from restaurateur Matt Moran, they were given 72 hours to use that money to overhaul their menu, service and décor in an effort to win both his and the critics' approval.

== Episodes ==
=== Season 1 ===
Episode		Original airdate	Ratings	Ref.
01	"Café Parlo vs Café 43"	6 February 2008	718,000	
02	"Bella Vita vs Mamma Teresa's"	13 February 2008	1,040,000	
03	"Dimitris vs Morris'"	20 February 2008	918,000	
04	"Grace vs Wild Oscars"	27 February 2008	943,000	
05	"Cafe Burgundy vs Cafe Matto"	5 March 2008	979,000	
06	"La Bella Vista vs Sophocles"	12 March 2008	1,062,000	
07	"The Olive Drum vs Unwine"	19 March 2008	1,025,000	
08	"Michelinos vs Zingarella"	2 April 2008	1,081,000	

=== Season 2 ===
Episode		Original airdate	Ratings	Ref.
01	"Angelina’s vs Tandoori Junction"	14 October 2008	825,000	
02	"Emad's vs Gloria's Cafe"	21 October 2008	825,000	
03	"Anacapri vs La De Da's"	28 October 2008	856,000	
04	"Piazza Navona vs South Yarra China House"	4 November 2008	962,000	
05	"Courthouse Restaurant vs Hotel Eden"	11 November 2008	902,000	
06	"Mambo Italiano vs Spargo Espresso"	18 November 2008	953,000	
07	"Baja Cantina vs Modena 88"	25 November 2008	913,000	
08	"Morri's Place vs Pizza Piazza"	2 December 2008	952,000	

== Ratings ==
The first episode of The Chopping Block had a disappointing debut, with only 718,000 viewers nationally, a low figure for its 7:30–8:30 timeslot. An uncut repeat of the first episode was aired the following night at 10:30pm, managing a reasonable 546,000 viewers for its timeslot. The second episode fared much better, managing 1,040,000 viewers nationally - nearly 300,000 more viewers than the first episode.

Overall, ratings for the second series were generally higher than the first, and both series averaged 959,517 viewers across the year.

== American version ==
NBC and Granada America have picked up the rights to produce the series in the United States. The American version is hosted by Marco Pierre White, and features a number of changes to the format, such as multiple contestants, an ongoing objective instead of self-contained episodes, and an emphasis on competition.

The first episode premiered on 11 March 2009, but was canceled due to low ratings after three episodes. After a 3-month hiatus, 'Chopping Block' returned to complete its season.
