= Jay Bienstock =

American television producer

Jay Bienstock is an American television producer. His credits include Behind the Music, Survivor, The Apprentice, 13: Fear is Real with film director Sam Raimi, Bachelor Pad, and The Voice.

In 2010, he formed Bienstock Young Media and over the next several years, the company produced projects for CBS, A&E, TLC, CMT, VH1, and ABC Family, as well as the series Animal Intervention hosted by Alison Eastwood for Nat Geo Wild and Time’s Up for MTV.

In 2014, Bienstock became CEO of Talpa Media USA, the American arm of global Dutch powerhouse Talpa, owned by John de Mol, one of the biggest names in unscripted programming. Their global game show hit Divided is currently airing 75 episodes on Game Show Network

Bienstock has been nominated eight times for an Emmy Award, winning three. He's been nominated three times for Producer of the Year in non-fiction television by the Producers Guild of America, winning twice, and nominated two times for Program of the Year by the Television Critics Association.

Bienstock grew up on Long Island where he graduated from Syosset High School and later earned his BFA at Emerson College in Boston.
