= Bankable Productions =

American film and television company founded by Tyra Banks

Bankable Productions (previously known as "Ty Ty Baby Productions") is an independent film and television production company founded by former model Tyra Banks who is its CEO. In 2023, the company renamed itself to SMiZE Productions. The name was chosen for its connection with SMiZE & Dream, the ice cream company of Banks. The company announced it would produce a graphic novel series featuring personified forms of ice cream characters inspired by the Banks family.

== Projects ==
=== Television ===
- America's Next Top Model (UPN & The CW) (2003–2012; production rights transferred to the separate "The Tyra Banks Company")
- The Tyra Banks Show (syndication & The CW) (2005–2010; co-production with Handprint Entertainment and Telepictures)
- Stylista (The CW) (2008: co-production with Warner Horizon Television)
- True Beauty (ABC) (2009–2010; co-production with Warner Horizon Television and Katalyst Media)

=== Film ===
- The Clique (2008)
- Life-Size 2 (2018)

=== Web productions ===
- Fa-Fa-Fa Fashion (2011)

== Deal with Warner Bros. ==
In October 2007, Banks signed an Exclusive Multiyear Development and Production Deal between Bankable Productions and Warner Bros. Entertainment. Under terms of the multiyear pact, Bankable Productions will create and produce original primetime television series programming via the Studio's Warner Bros. Television (WBTV) and Warner Horizon Television (WHTV) production units, as well as original movies for Warner Premiere, the Studio's direct-to-consumer production arm.
