= Blonde Charity Mafia =

- Starring: Katherine Kennedy; Sophie Pyle; Krista Johnson
- Country of origin: United States
- No. of seasons: 1
- No. of episodes: 6

Production
- Executive producers: Julie Pizzi; Patty Ivins

Original release
- Network: MTV Australia
- Release: August 5 – September 9, 2009

Blonde Charity Mafia is a reality television series produced by Patty Ivins and Julie Pizzi of PB&J Television that followed the lives of three socialites whose lives revolved around charity events. Although the show never aired in the United States, it did air on MTV Australia, MTV UK, and MTV New Zealand, as well as on Star! and other channels in multiple other countries. The show was bootlegged from Europe, and had a cult-like following in the United States for a brief period of time.

== Network and premiere date changes and cancellation ==
Blonde Charity Mafia was developed by the Lifetime network, and filmed in September 2008 on location in Washington, D.C. After production was completed, Lifetime decided to sell the series to The CW rather than airing it. The CW scheduled the series premiere for July 7, 2009 at 9 p.m. Eastern/8 p.m. Central. However, the network later decided to forgo all new programming for that summer, and planned to broadcast the series in the winter as a midseason replacement. Sometime after that, The CW apparently lost interest in the show; it removed references to the series from its websites, and on December 29, officially confirmed that it would not air on the network. Blonde Charity Mafia was apparently dropped in favor of two reality series developed by The CW, Fly Girls, about Virgin America flight attendants, and High Society, which followed socialite Tinsley Mortimer. On May 20, 2010, not long after completing their eight-episode runs, both of these series were canceled as well.
