= Easy Money (TV series) =

- Genre: Comedy drama
- Created by: Diane Frolov; Andrew Schneider
- Directed by: Alik Sakharov
- Starring: Laurie Metcalf; Jeff Hephner; Jay R. Ferguson; Katie Lowes; Marsha Thomason; Nick Searcy
- Country of origin: United States
- Original language: English
- No. of seasons: 1
- No. of episodes: 8

Production
- Executive producers: Diane Frolov; Andy Schneider; Jimmy Mulville
- Producers: Bobby Gaylor; Alyson Evans
- Production locations: Albuquerque, New Mexico
- Running time: 42 minutes
- Production companies: Hat Trick Productions; Media Rights Capital

Original release
- Network: The CW
- Release: October 5, 2008 – August 16, 2009

Easy Money is an American comedy-drama television series that aired on The CW from October 5, 2008 to August 16, 2009. The series was created by Diane Frolov and Andrew Schneider. The show, along with Valentine, Surviving Suburbia, and In Harm's Way, are shows programmed by Media Rights Capital (MRC), an independent producer of television programming. The Sunday night block (5pm–10pm) was sold to the producers on a leased-time basis from The CW after the network had no ratings success with the night.

Production of the series was put on hold in mid-October and was expected to resume within four to six weeks. Two weeks later, MRC decided to cancel both Easy Money and Valentine. On November 20, 2008, The CW announced that it was ending its Sunday Night agreement with MRC, removing the current shows and programming the night itself. On July 6, 2009, The CW announced that beginning July 26, the series would begin burning off the remaining episodes Sundays at 7 p.m.

== Plot ==
28-year-old Morgan Buffkin (Hephner) finds himself in charge of Prestige Payday Loans, his eccentric family's enormously successful short-term loan business. Any doubts Morgan has about running his family's business are quickly replaced by dealing with family business. Morgan's brother Cooper (Ferguson) insists on driving a silver-plated Hummer, Morgan's sister Brandy (Lowes) has questionable morals, he suspects that his mother (Metcalfe) and father (Searcy) are not being completely honest with him about his relation to the family, and every so often, part-time detective Barry (Reinhold) drops in.

== Cast ==
- Laurie Metcalf as Bobette Buffkin
- Nick Searcy as Roy Buffkin
- Marsha Thomason as Julia Miller
- Jeff Hephner as Morgan Buffkin
- Jay R. Ferguson as Cooper Buffkin
- Katie Lowes as Brandy Buffkin
- Judge Reinhold as Barry

== International syndication ==
Fox Life Serbia has aired the complete series. Fox Life Turkey aired all 8 episodes in 2009.

== Episodes ==
No.	Title	Directed by	Written by	Original release date	U.S. viewers (millions)
1	"DNA"	Alik Sakharov	Diane Frolov, Andrew Schneider	October 5, 2008	1.077
In the opener of a drama following a family that runs a high-interest loan business, matriarch Bobette Buffkin has problems from new competitors and middle son Morgan steps in to help. Meanwhile, Morgan probes a childhood secret with the help of beautiful grad student Julia Miller.
2	"Sub-Prime"	Alik Sakharov	Diane Frolov, Andrew Schneider	October 12, 2008	0.753
Brandy tires of Mike's get-rich-quick schemes, while Mike takes desperate measures to pay off his debts. Thanks to Julia's research, Morgan believes he's not related to his family and seeks the truth. Dr. Bowers (Peter Bogdanovich) may have answers regarding Morgan's past. Bobette gets help from Morgan, who confronts her new business rival (Peter Navy Tuiasosopo).
3	"Collateral Damage"	Rick Wallace	Bob Lowry, Diane Frolov, Andrew Schneider	October 19, 2008	0.712
Morgan angers Bobette when he confronts her about the discrepancies in her stories about his childhood. She responds by revealing the rest of the secrets about his past. Meanwhile, Julia is guarded when Detective Yapp becomes curious about her research; and Brandy and Mike continue to struggle financially.
4	"Chock Full O' Nuts"	Rob Thompson	Bobby Gaylor	October 26, 2008	0.659
Morgan continues his research into his past while he and Bobette press a failed businessman who owes money on a loan. Meanwhile, Brandy takes matters into her own hands regarding Mike's financial problems.
5	"Extra Mayo"	Nick Marck	Stephen Hootstein	July 26, 2009	0.506
Morgan gets a surprise when a man claims to be a long-lost cousin, but soon he and Bobette doubt the man's story; Cooper discovers that a bank owner is unfairly charging Prestige clients, and Bobette has an angry borrower who is eager to get revenge on the man; Mike leaves town in fear after another encounter with the Mamayo Brothers.
6	"Bassmaster"	Kenneth Johnson	Steve Kornacki	August 2, 2009	0.65
A defaulting borrower hands Morgan the keys to his fishing boat, but the boat is locked in a storage facility that belongs to a nemesis who refuses to turn over the vessel. Meanwhile, Cooper tries to rekindle the romance in his marriage, but the results are less than he hoped for; and Brandy visits Pastor Jeff to talk about her indiscretion.
7	"Bella Roma"	Max Tash	Diane Frolov, Andrew Schneider	August 9, 2009	0.614
Julia meets all the Buffkins when Bobette invites her to join Morgan for a family dinner. Elsewhere, an RV salesman who is late on a payment pulls a gun on Bobette and Morgan; and two prostitutes who owe money ask for help with finding a place to live.
8	"Bags, Bangles & Booty"	Stephen Cragg	Stephen Hootstein	August 16, 2009	0.59
Morgan confronts Bobette about the way she has manipulated Julia as his relationship with Julia hangs in the balance. Elsewhere, Bobette and Brandy attend Madison's bridal shower, where they receive the cold shoulder from Madison's mother.
