= Fly Girls (TV series) =

- intertitle of Fly Girls
- Genre: Reality
- Created by: Bradley Bredeweg; Peter Paige; Jeff Collins
- Starring: see Starring
- Country of origin: United States
- Original language: English
- No. of seasons: 1
- No. of episodes: 8

Production
- Running time: 20–22 minutes
- Production company: Collins Avenue Productions

Original release
- Network: The CW
- Release: March 24 – May 5, 2010

Fly Girls is an American reality television series that follows the personal lives of five flight attendants working for Virgin America.

The first and only season of Fly Girls consisted of 8 episodes. It premiered on March 24, 2010 and finished May 5, 2010.

== Overview ==
=== Background ===
The show was picked up by The CW on September 23, 2009 for eight half-hour episodes. The show followed the cast as they fly to a range of locations including Las Vegas, South Beach and New York City while also focusing on their home life, at their "crash-pad" in Los Angeles. The show is produced by Collins Avenue Productions, with executive producers Jeff Collins and Colin Nash along with co-executive producers Bradley Bredeweg and Peter Paige.

=== Starring ===
- Louise Nguyen
- Farrah Williams - Flight Attendant for Virgin America since its inaugural flight.
- Tasha Dunnigan
- Mandalay Roberts
- Nikole Rubyn
- Rachel Moore- Australian Flight Attendant (seen on 'The Bachelor Australia' in 2015)

=== Cancellation ===
On May 20, 2010 The CW canceled the series of Fly Girls after one season.

== Episodes ==
No.	Title	Original release date	U.S. viewers (millions)
1	"Prepare for Take-Off"	March 24, 2010	1.162
Five flight attendants for Virgin America reveal what is behind the curtain of the lives and their profession. An IFB ("in-flight boyfriend") invites Louise and Mandy to a party. Tasha and Farrah get ready to welcome their new roommate, Nikole.
2	"Turbulent Relationships"	March 31, 2010	1.120
Mandy and Louise fly to New York to visit a rocker who Mandy hopes will become more than a friend. Nikole and Tasha work a Virgin American charity event and attempt to overcome their differences. Farrah contemplates a career move from flight attendant to a corporate position.
3	"Rocking the Boat"	April 7, 2010	1.022
Tasha spends the weekend with her son while the rest of girls attend a yacht party accompanied by Louise's sister and Nikole's boyfriend.
4	"Destination: Sin City"	April 14, 2010	0.895
The girls head to Las Vegas for Tasha's birthday where Nikole gets a little too close to the DJ.
5	"Cabin Pressure"	April 21, 2010	0.904
Tasha has a disagreement with a passenger on board a flight and accuses Farrah of reporting her.
6	"High Expectations"	April 28, 2010	0.919
Louise is confronted by her family about her career and party lifestyle. Nikole tells Jon what happened in Las Vegas.
7	"The Third Wheel"	May 5, 2010	1.105
In Miami, Louise takes a man Mandy liked. Meanwhile back in LA, Farrah receives disappointing news.
8	"Unexpected Departures"	May 5, 2010	0.859
Louise chooses her boyfriend over her friendship with Mandy. Farrah decides to move out of the crash pad feeling it is the next step in her life and Nikole receives a shock proposal from Jon, in the air.
