= Dating in the Dark (American TV series) =

- Genre: Reality
- Starring: Rossi Morreale (Host)
- No. of seasons: 2
- No. of episodes: 12

Production
- Running time: 45 minutes

Original release
- Network: ABC
- Release: 20 July 2009 – 13 September 2010

Related
- Dating in the Dark

Dating in the Dark is a reality television series that premiered on ABC on 20 July 2009. The show's format is based on a Dutch dating show called Daten in het Donker (meaning "Dating in the Dark").

== Format ==
=== Dating ===
Three men and three women are sequestered in separate wings of the house, unable to have any conversation or contact with the opposite sex unless in the dark room. Initially, all six contestants have a group date in which they all sit at a table in the dark room exchanging names and getting to know one another's voices and personality types. After this date, each contestant can invite another contestant for a one-on-one date; these dates are also held in the dark room.

Throughout the show, the host, Rossi Morreale, provides the men and women with additional insights by providing personality profiles showing which contestants are their best matches and also allowing them to view items the others have brought to the house, such as items of clothing or luggage. Other episodes include sketch artists drawing contestants' impressions of each other.

After the one-on-one dates, each contestant can choose to invite another that they wish to see. The contestants enter the dark room for the final time and are revealed to each other one at a time. During the reveal process the couple must remain silent.

=== The Reveal Process ===
While being shown in the light, a contestant cannot see the other contestant's reaction. Each contestant is standing at opposite ends of the dark room with a very large two-way mirror between them. A color camera films from the dark side of the mirror while the other is illuminated on the other side. A separate infrared camera films the person on the dark side's reaction; the two images are combined in post-production. This is done, in part, by using video editing software to fade the infrared image of the person being revealed to black before they are illuminated, then seamlessly showing the color image of the person being revealed as it is faded in and out. During the reveal process the couple must remain silent.

=== The Balcony ===
The show culminates with each contestant choosing whether to meet another on the balcony of the house. The contestant will go to the balcony and wait for his or her prospective partner to join him or her. Joining the other on the balcony signifies that the contestants both want to pursue a relationship; exiting the house through the front door signifies that they do not want to pursue a relationship. Cameras are set up to show both the meeting balcony and the front door.

== Episodes ==
=== Season 1 (2009) ===
Episode 1 (20 July 2009)

Female's	Age	Male's Name	Age	Chooses to Date/Meet on Balcony?
Melanie	31	Allister	29	Him-Yes Her-Yes
Christina	28	Seth	31	Him-Yes Her-No
Leni	27	Stephen	31	Him-Yes Her-Yes

Episode 2 (27 July 2009)

Female's Name	Age	Male's Name	Age	Chooses to Date/Meet on Balcony?
Chrystee	32	Jason	31	Him-No Her-Yes
Megan	31	Matt	28	Him-Yes Her-Yes
Lindsey	26	Doug	31	Him-Yes Her-Yes

Episode 3 (3 August 2009)

Female's Name	Age	Male's Name	Age	Chooses to Date/Meet on Balcony?
Sasha	30	Chris	26	Him-No Her-No
Megan	23	Chris	26	Him-No Her-No
Jennifer	30	Chris	26	Him-Yes Her-No

- Chris was chosen by all three girls for the final date and the reveal.
- Chris was chosen by all three girls to meet on the balcony, however, none of them did meet him.
- The other guys are Philip(27) and Billy Ray(33).

Episode 4 (10 August 2009)

Female's Name	Age	Male's Name	Age	Chooses to Date/Meet on Balcony?
Lisa	39	Dion	37	Him-Yes Her-Yes
Tawny	37	Leo	26	Him-Yes Her-No
Tanya	24	Malek	29	Him-Yes Her-No

Episode 5 (17 August 2009)

Female's Name	Age	Male's Name	Age	Chooses to Date/Meet on Balcony?
Deanne	27	Jeff	30	Him-Yes Her-Yes
Renee	28	Jose	30	Him-Yes Her-No
Gina	24	Matt	32	Him-Yes Her-No

Episode 6 (24 August 2009)

Female's Name	Age	Male's Name	Age	Chooses to Date/Meet on Balcony?
Shannon	34	Jeff	33	Him-Yes Her-No
Misty	35	Amit	30	Him-Yes Her-No
Kelly	35	Cormac	33	Him-Yes Her-Yes

=== Season 2 (2010) ===
Episode 1 (9 August 2010)

Female's Name	Age	Male's Name	Age	Chooses to Date/Meet on Balcony?
Natasha	23	Joey	31	Him-Yes Her-No
Jessica	24	Dave	26	Him-Yes Her-Yes
Kym	27	Storm	27	Him-Yes Her-Yes

- Joey (31) didn't get chosen for a final date or reveal.
- Both Jessica and Natasha wanted Dave, so they waited on the patio and in the piano room respectively.

Episode 2 (16 August 2010)

Female's Name	Age	Male's Name	Age	Chooses to Date/Meet on Balcony?
Becky	23	Michael	25	Him-Yes Her-Yes
Karolina	28	Christian	30	Him-Yes Her-Yes
Summer	30	Michael	25	Him-No Her-No

- Joshua and Summer didn't get pictures, while Michael and Becky got two pictures.
- Joshua (28) didn't participate in the reveal or the waiting.

Episode 3 (23 August 2010)

Female's Name	Age	Male's Name	Age	Chooses to Date/Meet on Balcony?
Lisa	25	Brian	24	Him-No Her-Yes
Nikki	28	Jonny	29	Him-Yes Her-Yes
Chelsea	27	Billy	33	Him-Yes Her-Yes

Episode 4 (30 August 2010)

Female's Name	Age	Male's Name	Age	Chooses to Date/Meet on Balcony?
Katy	25	Drew	27	Him-Yes Her-Yes
Jill	27	Brad	32	Him-Yes Her-Yes
Kate	27	Brad	32	Him-No Her-No

- John (29) didn't participate in the reveal or the waiting.
- Both Jill and Kate wanted Brad, so they waited on the patio and in the piano room respectively. Kate left before Brad made a decision.

Episode 5 (6 September 2010)

Female's Name	Age	Male's Name	Age	Chooses to Date/Meet on Balcony?
Violet	27	Chad	33	Him-Yes Her-Yes
Randi	28	Kyle	25	Him-Yes Her-Yes
Melanie	30	Jason	27	Him-Yes Her-No

Episode 6 (13 September 2010)

Female's Name	Age	Male's Name	Age	Chooses to Date/Meet on Balcony?
Kahleel	27	Harrison	25	Him-Yes Her-Yes
Kayla	23	Harrison	25	Him-No Her-Yes

- For the first time, twin brothers (Ray and Shawn)(26) participate on the show at the same time but they were not chosen for a final date or reveal.
- Harrison was chosen by all three girls for a final date and by Kahleel and Kayla for the final reveal.
- Suzanne (24) decided to not date anyone so she did not wait on the patio.
- Kayla and Kahleel both choose to wait for Harrison on the patio and in the piano room respectively.

== Ratings ==
=== Season 1 (2009) ===
Order	Rating	Share	Rating/Share (18–49)	Viewers (millions)	Rank (Night)	Rank (Timeslot)	Rank (Week)
1	4.1	7	2.5/7	6.34	6	1	7
2	4.2	7	2.5/7	6.36	6	1	8
3	2.4	4	1.6/5	3.64	6	3	17
4	3.0	5	1.7/5	4.50	8	3	14
5	2.9	5	1.8/5	4.60	9	4	15
6	2.8	4	1.7/5	4.18	10	5	18

=== Season 2 (2010) ===
Order	Rating	Share	Rating/Share (18–49)	Viewers (millions)	Rank (Night)	Rank (Timeslot)
7	2.9	5	1.8/5	4.44	4	1
8	2.5	4	1.6/4	3.76	8	1
9						
10						
11						
12						
