= Game Show in My Head =

- Written by: Todd Hurvitz
- Directed by: David Franke; Bob McKinnon; Billy Rainey
- Starring: Joe Rogan
- Country of origin: United States
- Original language: English
- No. of seasons: 1
- No. of episodes: 8

Production
- Executive producers: Michael Binkow; Karey Burke; Jason Goldberg; Ashton Kutcher; Jimmy Mulville; Leon Wilde
- Producers: Paul Hardy; Sara K. Sanders; Kate Harrington; Aaron Sandler
- Editors: Miles Barken; Justin Curran; Tato Maizza; Paul Makkos; Martin Skibosh; Jimmy Tartanella; Brian Horn; Spencer Standler
- Running time: 30 Minutes
- Production companies: Hat Trick Productions; Katalyst Films; Fox 21

Original release
- Network: CBS
- Release: January 3 – January 24, 2009

Game Show in My Head is an American television game show produced by Ashton Kutcher and hosted by Joe Rogan. The show premiered on CBS on January 3, 2009, and aired on Saturdays at 8PM Eastern Standard Time.

== History ==
CBS originally ordered a pilot of Game Show in My Head hosted by Chris Kattan, but later decided to re-shoot the pilot with a new host, Joe Rogan. CBS ordered an unnamed number of episodes of the series. In March 2008, the show began seeking contestants. In December 2008, CBS announced that they would begin airing episodes of the new version of the show on Saturdays, starting January 3, 2009.

Saturdays are the least-watched night of the week, this move has inspired speculation that the network has a lack of faith in the program.

== Gameplay ==
Game Show in My Head is a hidden camera show in which contestants must perform a series of five "hilarious and embarrassing" tasks in front of strangers, which they are instructed to do by the host via an earpiece.

Each of the tasks is worth $5,000, and contestants can also double their money in a "no-holds-barred bonus round." Therefore, the maximum amount of money that a contestant can earn is $50,000. The show is similar to the classic Nickelodeon game show You're On!. That is, the contestants have to get strangers to complete tasks while they're caught on a hidden camera. The contestants on location and in studio are taped live.

Game Show in My Head premiered with Two Back-to Back Episodes on Saturday, January 3, 2009 (8:00-9:00 PM, ET/PT). Shalisse Pekarcik, a 26-year-old personal trainer from Salt Lake City, Utah, and Craig Scime, a 32-year-old entrepreneur from Buffalo, New York, competed for the chance to win $50,000 each.

== Ratings ==
Viewership and ratings per episode of Game Show in My Head
No.	Title	Air date	Timeslot (ET)	Rating/share (18–49)	Viewers (millions)	Ref.
1	"Shalisse Pekarcik"	January 3, 2009	Saturday 8:00 p.m.	2.2/4	3.3	
2	"Craig Scime"	January 3, 2009	Saturday 8:30 p.m.	2.2/4	3.4	
3	"Ron Ramsey"	January 10, 2009	Saturday 8:00 p.m.	4.3/7	7.2	
4	"Michael Rinzler"	January 10, 2009	Saturday 8:30 p.m.	3.3/5	5.6	
5	"Seth McLaughlin"	January 17, 2009	Saturday 8:00 p.m.	2.2/4	3.4	
6	"Debbie Speicher"	January 17, 2009	Saturday 8:30 p.m.	2.3/4	3.6	
7	"Wendy Taubin"	January 24, 2009	Saturday 8:00 p.m.	2.1/4	3.6	
8	"Eric Lokke"	January 24, 2009	Saturday 8:30 p.m.	2.3/4	3.9	
