= The Chopping Block (American TV series) =

- Presented by: Marco Pierre White
- Theme music composer: Duffy (Mercy)
- Original language: English
- No. of seasons: 1
- No. of episodes: 8

Production
- Executive producers: David Barbour and Julian Cress
- Producer: Granada America

Original release
- Network: NBC
- Release: 11 March – 24 July 2009

Related
- The Chopping Block (Australian version)

The Chopping Block is an American reality television series, based on the Australian reality television series of the same name. The series aired on the NBC network and followed participants in an attempt to open a restaurant. It is hosted by British celebrity chef Marco Pierre White.

The first episode premiered on March 11, 2009, to low ratings. Two more episodes aired, each with worse ratings than the last. On March 26, 2009, NBC canceled the series, choosing to run repeats of Law & Order: Criminal Intent in the timeslot. The series completed "airing" on NBC.com and Hulu, releasing one a week.

On April 24, 2009, NBC announced the series would return to television in Friday, June 19, despite airing on the internet already. After the fourth episode aired on the 19th, it was pre-empted on June 26 by television coverage surrounding the deaths of Farrah Fawcett and Michael Jackson the day before. The show returned Friday, July 3. It then proceeded to air until Friday, July 24, the day the final episode aired on NBC.

On April 27, 2009, British TV began showing the series on ITV2, immediately following the finale of Hell's Kitchen, also hosted by Marco Pierre White, on ITV1 of which 6 of the episodes being aired, although episode 7 was not shown on Monday at 8 o clock as would be expected, and there has been no explanation as to what has happened to the series in the UK or why the episode was not shown.

== Format ==
Eight contestant pairs, each consisting of a chef and a front-of-house member with an existing relationship, are divided into two teams of four pairs each. The teams are each assigned an empty restaurant space, across the street from each other in downtown Manhattan. Each week, the teams are given a task, and open their restaurants for a service. The team judged to have lost that service has its weakest pair eliminated from the show by chef White. Each week, the teams also have a challenge to compete in (sometimes relating to the kitchen, and sometimes relating to front-of-house), the winner of which gains an advantage during the subsequent service.

The format of the American version differs markedly to that of the original Australian version.

== Contestants ==
The first season consisted of 8 teams of 2 participants each:

- Angela Brown-Johnson & Samantha Johnson from Philadelphia, Pennsylvania
- Alex (Zan) McCoy & Nate (Than) McCoy from Cabin John, Maryland
- Panya Rice & Michael Holmes from Atlanta, Georgia
- Mikey Torres & Chad Phillips from Washington, D.C.
- Lisa Stalvey & Michael Anapol from Los Angeles, California
- Denise Nguyen & Khoa Nguyen from Washington, D.C.
- Kelsey Henderson & Vanessa Henderson from Los Angeles, California
- Dean Della Ventura & Shari Della Ventura from Millbury, Massachusetts

== Episode results ==
Teams	Relationship	1	2	3^{1}	4^{2}	5^{2}	6^{2}	7^{2}*	FINALE^{2}
Head Chef		Lisa [Red] Than [Black]	Michael [Red] Dean [Black]	Kelsey [Red] Dean [Black]	Lisa [Red] Than[Black]	Kelsey [Red] Angie [Black]	Lisa [Red] Dean [Black]	Lisa vs. Kelsey	Kelsey [Red] Lisa [Black]
Kelsey & Vanessa	Sisters	WIN	IN	IN	WIN	WIN	WIN	WIN	WINNER
Anapol & Lisa	Ex-Husband & Wife	WIN	IN	IN	WIN	WIN	WIN	FINALIST	RUNNER-UP
Dean & Shari	Married	IN	WIN	WIN	IN	IN	OUT		
Angie & Samantha	Mother & Daughter	IN	WIN	WIN	IN	OUT			
Zan & Than	Brothers	LOW	WIN	WIN	OUT				
Panya & Michael	Engaged	WIN	IN	OUT					
Mikey & Chad	Friends	WIN	OUT						
Denise & Khoa	Cousins	OUT							

^Note 1: The show was cancelled after three episodes.
^Note 2: The remaining shows are broadcast each Wednesday night on NBC.com. These episodes then air on NBC with Episode 4 having started off the airing of the episodes on June 19, and a break on June 26 because of the Farrah documentary.

^Note *: This episode had no elimination.

Hotpink background and WINNER means that team was the winner of the competition
Cornflowerblue background and RUNNER-UP means that team was the runner-up of the competition
Green background and WIN means that the team was crowned winner for that week
Blue background and LOW means that the team was up for elimination
Orange background and OUT means that the team bowed out
Brown background and OUT means that the team was told to take off their aprons and was eliminated
Violet background and WIN means that the team was a finalist and won the challenge, but there was no elimination in that episode

Black background means that the team is a member of the black team
Red background means that the team is a member of the red team
Lightgrey background means that the couple(s) were the final two

== U.S. nielsen ratings ==
=== U.S. ratings ===
Order	Episode	Rating	Share	Rating/Share (18–49)	Viewers (millions)
1	"Episode 101"	TBA	4	1.5/4	3.98
2	"Episode 102"	2.4	4	1.3/4	3.46
3	"Episode 103"	1.8	3	0.9/2	2.60
4	"Episode 104"	TBA	TBA	0.6/2	1.94
