= Crash Course (game show) =

- Created by: Bruce Beresford-Redman; Rick Hurvitz
- Presented by: Dan Cortese; Orlando Jones
- No. of episodes: 3 (1 unaired)

Production
- Running time: 60 minutes
- Production companies: A. Smith & Co. Productions; Mindcrime

Original release
- Network: ABC
- Release: August 26 – September 16, 2009

Crash Course is an American game show that premiered on ABC on August 26, 2009. It is hosted by Orlando Jones and Dan Cortese. The series has teams of two competing for a golden steering wheel and $50,000.

The series failed to get an audience and has been canceled after three aired episodes.

== Premise ==
Hosted by Orlando Jones and Dan Cortese. Five teams of two are revealed at the beginning (Siblings, Mother-Son, Best Friends, Single Moms, Roommates, Neighbors etc.). The first round has all five teams competing, for example, in car bowling, the team with the lowest amount of pins would be eliminated.

For round two, the four teams would tackle an even more difficult challenge, another example, in Catch Me If You Can, the teams would fight through barrels to get up on a platform. Some cars don't make it and fall upside-down sometimes. The team who doesn't make it up as far or with the slowest time is eliminated.

For round three, the three teams fight against each other in a challenging course. For example, in Car Dominoes (What Orlando Jones says, "DON'T TRY THIS AT HOME!!"), the teams must slam into exploding cars and the team that completes it in the slowest time would be eliminated.

In the final crash course, the two remaining teams would go through an almost impossible obstacle course. They would start by going through barrels and then through a pourdown of barrels and tubes. Then through Wreck Alley, where they go through some exploding on-fire cars following a mud track. Then the teams would stop in front of a dead end and switch drivers while being sprayed by some intense water. Then they back up and go through one of the garages with water barrels on the other side, then through Animal Crossing where they would have to look out for animals (Like Orlando Jones says "NOT REAL ANIMALS!"). Finally, they would go through a gate where fire would leap beside it and finish. The team with the faster time would get the $50,000 and the golden steering wheel.

== Stats ==
Episode One:

Team Siblings (1st, won in the final crash course)

Team Married (2nd, lost by 48 seconds in the final crash course)

Team Roommates (3rd, failed to beat Team Married's time in Car Dominoes)

Team Best Friends (4th, failed to go as high as Team Roommates on CMIYC)

Team Single Moms (5th, was further away from the 100 than Team Married)

Episode Two:

Team Brothers In-Law (1st, won in the final crash course)

Team Mother-Son (2nd, lost by 52 seconds in the final crash course)

Team Best Friends (3rd, finished last in Tow Tow Tow Your Boat)

Team Married (4th, got the shortest distance on Roof Slide)

Team Neighbors (5th, lost in tie breaker bowl-off with Team Married)

== Premiere ==
The series premiered after Wipeout on August 26, 2009, and premiered to good ratings and was at #3 that night behind Wipeout and America's Got Talent.

The third episode was originally going to air on September 9, 2009, but due to a Presidential Address, it was postponed. It aired the next week, September 16, as the series finale.
