= Stylista =

American television series

- Created by: Eli Holzman
- Starring: Anne Slowey; Joe Zee; Keegan Allen; Chelsea Kane; Robert Wisdom; Tristan Wilds; Jessica Stroup; AnnaLynne McCord; Trevor Donovan; Jamal Duff; Gideon Emery; Daniella Alonso; Zosia Mamet; Johnny Pacar; Kristy Wu; Madison Pettis; Amber Skye Noyes; Jared Padalecki; Valerie Cruz
- Country of origin: United States
- No. of seasons: 1
- No. of episodes: 9

Production
- Executive producers: Tyra Banks; Ken Mok; Eli Holzman; Desiree Gruber; Jane Cha
- Production companies: Warner Horizon Television; 10 by 10 Entertainment; Bankable Productions; Eli Holzman Productions; Full Picture Entertainment; Development Hell; Magic Molehill Productions

Original release
- Network: The CW
- Release: October 22 – December 17, 2008

Stylista is an American fashion reality competition series that premiered on The CW in the United States, and Citytv in Canada on October 22, 2008 and ran for one season. The series was produced by Warner Horizon Television and Tyra Banks through her Bankable Productions. On January 30, 2008, The CW approved the series for production.

Johanna Cox was named the winner on December 17, 2008, at the 9th episode conclusion. She won a paid editorial position at Elle magazine, a paid lease on an apartment in Manhattan, and a clothing allowance at H&M, all for one year, valued at $100,000.

== Contestants ==
Contestant	Occupation
Johanna Cox	Military Analyst
Dyshaun Burton	Wardrobe Stylist
Meghan Johnson	Boutique Owner
Ashlie Butler	Fashion Buyer
Kate Gallagher	Former Law Student
Danielle Scott	Clothing Store Manager
Devin VanderMaas	New York University Fashion Student
William Buckley	Freelance Fashion Assistant
Cologne Schmidt	University of California, Berkeley Student
Jason	Aspiring Fashion Designer
Arnaldo	Ivy League Graduate

== Elimination chart ==
Placement	Contestants	Episode								
Placement	Contestants	1	2	3	4	5	7	8	9	
1	Johanna	WIN	LOW	IN^{[r]}	LOW	LOW^{[r]}	WIN	WIN	IN	WINNER
2	DyShaun	WIN	LOW	IN	LOW	WIN	WIN^{[r]}	LOW	IN	RUNNER-UP
3	Megan	LOW	LOW^{[r]}	IN	WIN	WIN^{[r]}	WIN	WIN^{[r]}	OUT	
4	Ashlie	WIN^{[r]}	IN	LOW	WIN	WIN	LOW	OUT		
5	Kate	IN	IN	LOW	WIN	IN	OUT			
6	Danielle	LOW	WIN	WIN	WIN	OUT				
7	Devin	IN	IN	WIN	OUT					
8	William	IN	WIN	WIN	OUT					
9	Cologne	WIN	WIN	OUT						
10	Jason	IN	OUT							
11	Arnaldo	OUT								

This contestant won Stylista
This contestant won the Editorial challenge
This contestant was on the losing team but not eliminated
This contestant was in the bottom 2 or 3
This contestant was eliminated

- Episode 6 was the recap episode

== Episodes ==
Episode	U.S. Air Date	Rating/Share (18-49)	Viewers (Millions)
"Pilot"	October 22, 2008	1.2	2.45
"Hidden Gems"	October 29, 2008	0.9	1.87
"No More Mr. Nice Guy"	November 5, 2008	1.0	2.00
"Shop It Like It's Hot"	November 12, 2008	0.9	1.73
"It's All About Who You Know"	November 19, 2008	1.0	2.16
"Clip Show"	November 26, 2008	n/a	n/a
"Model Behavior"	December 3, 2008	0.6	1.41
"Fashion Show 101"	December 10, 2008	n/a	n/a
"The Right Fit"	December 17, 2008	n/a	n/a
