= 13: Fear Is Real =

- Show logo
- Created by: Jay Bienstock; Gunnar Wetterberg
- Country of origin: United States
- Original language: English
- No. of seasons: 1
- No. of episodes: 8

Production
- Running time: 60 minutes
- Production companies: Jay Bienstock Productions; Ghost House Pictures; Warner Horizon Television; Magic Molehill

Original release
- Network: The CW
- Release: January 7 – February 20, 2009

13: Fear Is Real is an American horror reality competition series which aired on The CW from January 7 to February 20, 2009. It follows a group of 13 contestants as they are trying to survive in a setting inspired by horror movies. On May 27, 2009, The CW canceled the series after one season.

== About the show ==
13: Fear Is Real was produced by Magic Molehill Productions, Inc. and Warner Horizon Television Inc. in association with Jay Bienstock Productions and Ghost House Pictures with executive producers Jay Bienstock (Survivor, The Apprentice), Sam Raimi (the Spider-Man films, the Evil Dead films) and Robert Tapert (the Evil Dead films, The Grudge films).

The show involved 13 people competing against each other to avoid elimination in situations utilising their "deepest fears". The 13 will face shocking surprises, psychological scares and many "beware of the dark" moments, all designed by a "mastermind" of terror. In addition to frightening them, he will also entice individuals to work in concert with him and against the others, creating a situation in which the 13 will not only look over their shoulders but will also never be certain who is real before them. Each week, one or two unlucky victims will be "killed off" via frightening challenges and game-playing until only one person is left to win the grand prize of—fittingly—$66,666.

=== Challenges ===
Each round of the game consisted of two challenges: a "ritual" and an "execution ceremony."

==== Rituals ====
"Rituals" were challenges designed to prey on players' deepest fears. They were played either as two-player teams or as individuals. In team rituals, if there is an odd number of players, one sits out and is granted immunity for that round.

The ritual was set up so that either one team or two individual players would fail the challenge. The two players that failed the challenge were "condemned" to the "execution ceremony."

==== Execution Ceremonies ====
The "execution ceremony" was an elimination challenge normally played between the two players that failed the "ritual." If the current "killer" was successfully accused, they would also participate in the execution ceremony, as would any player who falsely accused another player of being the "killer."

Normally, the execution ceremony would consist of the players racing to escape a death trap of some sort. If a player successfully escaped, they would return to the game. The last player still in the death trap will be "killed" and eliminated from the game.

Prior to the execution ceremony, players would record "last words" on video as a farewell to the group in case they lost. The player who was "killed off" would have their video viewed by the rest of the group.

=== The Death Box ===
The death box was introduced the day after the contestants arrived. It was able to kill off a total of three players. Whoever had the death box became the "killer" and could kill off any other player at any time other than during a challenge. Any player who was killed off by the death box was eliminated from the game immediately, without any chance to give any last words. A bloody glove would be left on the bed of any player who was killed off by the death box.

Possessing the death box posed a risk to the killer. If another player believed that a particular player held it, they could accuse that player of being the killer. In that situation, all of the remaining players had to decide whether they agreed with the accusation. If so, the accusation would stand, and if correct, the killer would have to surrender the death box and would be sent to the execution ceremony.

Accusing another player of being the killer itself carried a risk. If the accusation was false, the accuser would then be sent to the execution ceremony.

If a player was killed off while in possession of the death box and it still had one or more uses remaining, it would be re-introduced to the game prior to the next ritual.

== Contestants ==
Elimination Chart
Name	Age	Occupation	Hometown	1^{1}	2^{2}	3	4	5	6^{3}	7	8^{4}
Ted Kirner	30	Carpenter	Philadelphia, PA	Safe	Safe	Safe	Safe	Safe	Safe	Risk	WINNER
Nasser Goins	20	Concierge	Philadelphia, PA	Safe	Risk	Safe	Safe	Safe	Safe	Safe	Dead
Erica Johnson	21	PR Consultant	Waycross, GA	Safe	Immune	Risk	Risk	Safe	Safe	Safe	Dead
Melyssa Nocar	24	Trainer	Columbus, OH	Safe	Safe	Safe	Safe	Safe	Safe	Dead	
Adam Wood	25	Musician	Seattle, WA	Safe	Risk	Safe	Safe	Safe	Risk	Dead	
Leah Lucas	21	Bartender	Philadelphia, PA	Safe	Safe	Safe	Safe	Risk	Dead		
Cody Minshew	22	Ghosthunter	Austin, TX	Immune	Safe	Safe	Safe	Safe	Dead		
Rodney Craft	26	Salesman	Los Angeles, CA	Safe	Safe	Safe	Safe	Dead			
Kelly Marquardt	23	Event Planner	San Diego, CA	Risk	Safe	Safe	Dead				
Ryan Norys	24	Sports Executive	Yorba Linda, CA	Safe	Safe	Dead					
Steffinie Phrommany	29	Assistant	North Hollywood, CA	Safe	Safe	Dead					
Laura Paul	27	Nursing Student	Medford, OR	Safe	Dead						
Lauren Harris	21	Model	Cherry Hill, NJ	Dead							

^1: In episode 1, Rodney found the death box and became the killer.
^2: In episode 2, Nasser falsely accused Laura of possessing the death box, and was forced into the execution ceremony and did not take part in the ritual. As there was an odd number for the ritual, Erica sat out and got immunity.
^3: In episode 6, Erica found the death box and became the killer.
^4: In episode 8, Nasser found the death box and became the killer.

The contestant won 13: Fear is Real, and claimed The $66,666 prize from The Mastermind.
The contestant was "condemned" into the execution ceremony and was at risk of being “killed off”, but won the task thus saving themselves from being executed.
The contestant lost the execution ceremony and was eliminated and "killed off".
The contestant was "killed off" by the contestant who is in possession of the death box.
The contestant was immune from the execution ceremony.

== Episodes ==
=== Execution Ceremonies ===
This Contestant was eliminated after their first time in the execution ceremony.
This Contestant was eliminated after their second time in the execution ceremony.
This Contestant was eliminated in the final execution ceremonies during the finale.

Episode	Contestant(s)			Challenge	Eliminated	Cause of Death
1	Kelly	vs.	Lauren	The first contestant to escape their coffin that's buried underneath the ground and climb up out back onto the surface is saved from being executed.	Lauren	Suffocated from being buried alive
2	Adam vs. Laura vs. Nasser			The first two contestants to escape steel chains and a mask containing rats are saved from being executed.	Laura	Face eaten alive by rats
3	Ryan	vs.	Erica	The first contestant to break free of ropes while tied to a tree and being distracted by dogs, falling trees, and explosions is saved from being executed.	Ryan	Crushed by a falling tree taken down by a chainsaw
4	Kelly	vs.	Erica	The first contestant to unlock the word lock (password: fried) and free themselves is saved from being executed.	Kelly	Chained and burned alive at the stake
5	Leah	vs.	Rodney	The first contestant to untie themselves before the swinging pendulum chops them in half is saved from death.	Rodney	Sliced in half by a pendulum
6	Leah	vs.	Adam	The first contestant to unlock the handcuffs and solve the clues before the bathroom is fully flooded is saved from being executed.	Leah	Drowned and attacked by snakes in a locked bathroom filling with water
7	Ted	vs.	Melissa	The first contestant to escape from the trunk of their car and get out of the car compactor is saved from being executed.	Melyssa	Crushed to death in the trunk of a car
Finale
8 (1)	Ted vs. Erica Vs. Nasser			Contestants had to locate one of three single-use death boxes hidden in the woods. The challenge did not end until one contestant found a death box and used it to kill off another player.	Erica	Killed by Nasser using the death box.
8 (2)	Nasser	vs.	Ted	The first contestant to find bolt cutters in an animal grave, find a barrel, cut it open, and get the key covered in body organs inside is saved from execution.	Nasser	Ambushed and killed by a minion wielding an axe
8 (3)	Ted			The final remaining contestant has to unlock a hut in which there is a bag containing the prize money. The hut is booby trapped with a trip wire connected to a time bomb set to detonate after 60 seconds. The contestant has to take the money, get out of the cabin, and row out of the blast radius before the bomb explodes.	None: Ted was successfully able to extract the $66,666 cash prize and escape the cabin before the bomb's detonation, becoming the sole survivor and "winner" of the Mastermind's twisted game.	

=== Rituals and Death Box Eliminations ===
No.	Ritual	Killed By Death Box
1	MEET THE MASTERMIND. The contestants paired up and had to locate their partner, who was tied up in the woods. The last team whose contestant located their partner failed the ritual. In Order: Ted/Erica 1st, Melyssa/Ryan 2nd, Laura/Adam 3rd, Rodney/Leah 4th, Steffinie/Nasser 5th, Kelly/Lauren (6th, Last Place)	Death box introduced
2	THE ACCUSED. The contestants paired up and got into boats, which they then rowed into the middle of an alligator-infested lake. Initially, they would simply have to sit in the boat, but as the challenge continued, they would have to remove plugs in the bottom of the boat (allowing water to flow in), bailing the boat out with scoops found in a box with two snakes, and then, ultimately, one of the players on each team would have to take a snake in each hand and hold them above their heads. The first team to wave a white flag found in the bottom of the boat (signifying a wish to end the ritual and return to shore) would fail the ritual. The teams were advised that the ritual would last as long as necessary to produce a losing team.	No one, but Laura falsely accused by Nasser
3	A KILLER AMONGST US. Prior to the ritual, the contestants were directed to repair a broken raft and use it to get to the other side of the swamp. The mastermind stated that he had left something for the contestants on the other side, and that it was up to them to choose whether or not to take what was left for them. Upon discovery of the crate, it was revealed to contain bottles of beer for each of the contestants. In the ritual, the contestants paired up. One member of each pair looked for pieces of a pentagram in scary locations while the other gave directions using a walkie-talkie and a map. Once the searching player found four pieces of the pentagram (to go with one they were provided at the beginning), they had to return to the starting point (a Satanic altar) and reassemble their pentagram. The last team to complete their pentagram failed the ritual.	Steffinie- killed by Rodney
4	FORT FEAR. The contestants headed to an old, abandoned military fort. They individually searched for keys which could each be used to unlock a box, inside which was a note saying, "REPRIEVE - You are safe". There were two fewer reprieves than players, so that the two players left without reprieves failed the ritual.	No one
5	A LESSON IN TERROR. The contestants were transported to an abandoned high school. They individually searched for rings, which would be found in the favorite classrooms of the school's students who had been murdered. Hints as to where specifically in the classrooms the rings might be found were written on the classroom chalkboards. There were two fewer rings than players, so that the two players left without rings failed the ritual.	No one – Rodney revealed as the killer
6	A DEAL WITH THE DEVIL. The contestants were transported to a slaughterhouse. Partners were chosen by who was sitting in the room with them at the time of the ritual. One partner was locked in a cage, and the other partner had to find them. The partner then had to find a key to unlock the cage, which could have been in any of the holes in the wall marked "?". The last team to have the caged partner freed failed the ritual.	Cody – killed by Erica
7	ALONE. The contestants are put into a dark room with a large snake. They were then put into straitjackets, and had to escape them. The last two contestants to escape their straitjackets failed the ritual.	Adam – killed by Erica
8	BOOM. The final three contestants are taken to an isolated part of the woods in the Bayou and forced to outwit each other in the final ceremonies. Prior to the final ceremonies, the contestants are directed to a shrine with pictures of the ten players who had previously been killed off. They are then directed to make a voodoo doll of the opponent who they believe poses the biggest threat to them and place a drop of their own blood on the doll (to "sanctify" it); they are provided with lancets to prick their fingers for this purpose.	Erica- killed by Nasser during Part One
