= More to Love =

Television series

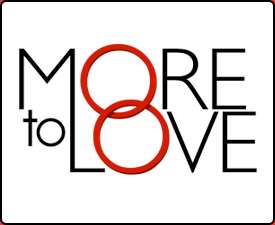
- Created by: Mike Fleiss
- Starring: Emme (host); Luke Conley
- Country of origin: United States
- No. of seasons: 1
- No. of episodes: 9

Production
- Executive producer: Mike Fleiss
- Production companies: Next Entertainment; 495 Productions; Warner Horizon Television

Original release
- Network: Fox
- Release: July 28 – September 15, 2009

More to Love is a reality game show (or dating game show) that premiered on Fox on July 28, 2009. The series was hosted by plus-sized model Emme. The show was created by Mike Fleiss (who also created The Bachelor).

== About the show ==
The series followed Luke Conley of Santa Maria, California, a single plus size man (age: 26, height: 6 ft 3 in [191 cm], weight: 330 lb [150 kg]) trying to find love among twenty plus size women. The first episode featured Luke giving a promise ring to each of the 20 ladies, with the promise he would not judge them by their size.

== Contestants ==
Name	Age	Height (ft in)	Weight (lbs)	Eliminated	Hometown
Tali Giat	26	5' 4"	165	Winner	New York, NY
Malissa A.	26	5' 4"	170	Episode 8	Covina, CA
Mandy	25	5' 7"	180	Episode 7	Long Beach, CA
Anna	27	6' 2"	230	Episode 6	San Francisco, CA
Heather	22	5' 5"	200	Episode 5	Ankeny, IA
Kristian	26	5' 5"	225	Episode 5	Wallington, NJ
Lauren	26	5' 9"	210	Episode 4	Atlanta, GA
Melissa	21	5' 6"	220	Episode 4	Baton Rouge, LA
Amanda	22	5' 10"	235	Episode 3	Glendora, CA
Bonnie	25	5' 11"	201	Episode 3	Portland, OR
Christina	23	5' 6"	206	Episode 3	Brighton, MI
Danielle	25	5' 9"	240	Episode 3	Baltimore, MD
Arriane	37	5' 10"	279	Episode 2	Wichita, KS
Magali	24	5' 7"	193	Episode 2	Sylmar, CA
Vanessa	32	5' 8"	194	Episode 2	Glendale, CA
Michelle	32	5' 5"	230	Episode 1	Orange County, CA
Natalia	28	5' 10"	229	Episode 1	Dallas, TX
Natasha	25	5' 9"	197	Episode 1	Canoga Park, CA
Sandy	30	5' 8"	200	Episode 1	Meyer, IA
Shari	34	5' 4"	180	Episode 1	Miami, FL
