= Opportunity Knocks (game show) =

- Opportunity Knocks logo with host J. D. Roth
- Genre: Game show
- Written by: Anna Lotto
- Directed by: Rich DiPirro
- Presented by: J. D. Roth
- Country of origin: United States
- Original language: English
- No. of seasons: 1
- No. of episodes: 3

Production
- Executive producers: Ashton Kutcher; Jason Goldberg; J. D. Roth; Karey Burke; Todd A. Nelson
- Running time: 60 minutes

Original release
- Network: ABC; City
- Release: September 23 – October 14, 2008

Opportunity Knocks is a 2008 game show hosted by J. D. Roth and executive produced by Ashton Kutcher and his Katalyst Productions. It premiered on September 23, 2008 on ABC and City in Canada, but received low ratings, especially in the 18–34-year-old age demographic, and was canceled after three episodes.

== Gameplay ==
At the beginning of the episode, a family is surprised by the ABC crew knocking on their door and telling them they have been selected to be on the show. They then have to answer questions about the other members of their family.

Each of the four family member contestants gets asked a series of four questions, worth, in order, $2,500, $5,000, $7,500, and $10,000. Getting all four correct (or, at some points in the game, buying the prize for a portion of their winnings, similar to Let's Make a Deal's "sure thing") wins the family member a prize package (usually having to do with the family member's interests) in addition to all the money won. Incorrect answers do not deduct from the score, but unless the family member decided to buy the prize beforehand, they forfeit the additional prize if the family member answers any questions incorrectly.

Some questions may be tasks, such as finding a diary. Some questions involve identifying the real thing out of a group of fakes, such as picking out a bedspread out of 15 or identifying which picture a non-playing family member drew and throwing the fakes into a shredder. Other questions are just trivia questions about the family member, such as which of four girls a family member has a crush on, or about their interests, such as identifying Nick from the Jonas Brothers. Many other questions include choosing which cookies the players mother made and remembering what time the clock the father made in school is stopped on.

In the final round, one member of the family, chosen by the family, tries to match the answers the other family members give to questions about themselves. The chosen contestant can try to double the family's cash winnings—without risk—by correctly matching two answers, or to risk the family's cash (but not prizes) for a chance at the grand prize of $250,000 by matching all three. The contestant must make his or her choice before hearing the questions asked. If the contestant chooses to make two matches, he or she must decide which two to match; if either of those two answers is wrong, the contestant does not get a third chance. If either of the three answers are wrong, the game is over and the contestant walked away without any money, but all prizes that are not cash are kept.

== Pilot ==
On October 25, 2025 the YouTube channel "The Game Show Vault" (previously known as Wink's Vault prior to Martindale's death) uploaded a 2002 pilot version of Opportunity Knocks hosted by Dave Coulier.

== International versions ==
Country	Name	Host	Network	Date premiered	Prize
Brazil	Gugu bate em sua porta	Augusto Liberato	Rede Record	2009	R$1.000.000
