= Hitched or Ditched =

- Genre: Reality
- Presented by: Tanya McQueen
- Country of origin: United States
- Original language: English
- No. of seasons: 1
- No. of episodes: 6

Production
- Executive producers: Mike Fleiss; Chris Coelen
- Production companies: Next Entertainment; RDF USA; Warner Horizon Television

Original release
- Network: The CW
- Release: May 26 – June 30, 2009

Hitched or Ditched refers to either a relationship book published in 2026 by Rupa Publications or a 2009 reality series that aired on The CW from May 26 to June 30, 2009.

== The Book ==
A non-fiction book written by Paromita Bannerjee and Rahul Singh that explores why modern relationships succeed or break down. It appeals a wide audience, including individuals who are single, dating, married, healing, or navigating a separation.

The book decodes the seven key factors that determine whether a relationship will survive, thrive or ultimately break down. By blending behavioural science, cultural observations, real-life case studies and practical advice, the authors offer a deeper understanding of modern companionship. Ultimately, it provides the rare emotional clarity needed to understand which relationships are worth saving and which require letting go.

== The Show ==
Hosted by Tanya McQueen, each episode is focusing on couples who are in long-term relationships but have not yet taken that big leap into marriage. Nominated by a friend who believes it's either time for the couple to tie to the knot or break up, each episode features a different couple who accept their friend's proposition to set a wedding date in one week's time. The series premiere gained 1.42 million viewers and a 0.7 rating in both Adults 18-49 and 18-34 demo. It was ultimately canceled after just 6 episodes.

== Development ==
It was announced on October 13, 2008 that The CW had ordered six episodes of a new wedding-themed reality series from RDF USA and The Bachelor producer Mike Fleiss, under the working title "For Better Or Worst". On April 6, 2009 the network announced that the show will premiere during summer on Tuesday, May 26 at 9/8c after the season finale of Reaper.

== Ratings ==
Order	Episode	Viewers (millions)
1	"Don't hate the player"	1.43
2	"Rescue me from your mum"	1.40
3	"Bastards out of California"	1.48
4	"The White Devil"	1.19
5	"A Cheater In Bean Town"	1.14
6	"Windy City Dilemma"	1.03
