= In Harm's Way (TV series) =

- Created by: Craig Piligian
- Country of origin: United States
- Original language: English
- No. of episodes: 8 (3 unaired)

Production
- Executive producer: Craig Piligian
- Running time: 60 minutes
- Production companies: Pilgrim Studios; Media Rights Capital

Original release
- Network: The CW
- Release: October 5 – November 2, 2008

In Harm's Way is a one-hour American reality television series on The CW that looked at the lives of people who perform dangerous jobs. Each unscripted episode followed the individuals who risk their lives in life-threatening jobs, including war photographers, oil well cappers, the Alaskan Coast Guard, bicycle messengers in Boston and minesweepers. The show was hosted by a former US Navy fighter pilot, Hunter Ellis.

The first episode was broadcast on October 5, 2008, at 7 pm Eastern time. The season averaged 0.69 million viewers and 0.2 of adults 18–49.

It was cancelled after just five episodes, along with the other MRC-produced series, and was replaced by re-runs of Jericho, with three produced episodes unshown. It was later shown in Hungary and Sweden.

== Ratings ==
Episode	U.S. air date	Rating/share (18-49)	Viewers (Millions)
"Coast Guard Swimmers"	October 5, 2008	0.3	0.67
"Pro Bull Riders"	October 12, 2008	0.3	0.73
"Live Animal Capture"	October 19, 2008	0.2	0.63
"War Photographer"	October 26, 2008	0.3	0.64
"Mine Sweepers"	November 2, 2008	0.2	0.84
"Landmine Clearance"	Unshown	n/a	n/a
"Volcanologist"	Unshown	n/a	n/a
"Hurricane Hunters"	Unshown	n/a	n/a
