= Collins Denny Jr. =

American lawyer

- Born: June 10, 1899; Nashville, Tennessee, U.S.
- Died: January 14, 1964 (aged 64); Powhatan County, Virginia, U.S.
- Resting place: Hollywood Cemetery
- Education: Princeton University; University of Virginia School of Law
- Occupation: Lawyer
- Spouse: Rebecca Smith Miller
- Children: 2 sons
- Parent(s): Collins Denny; Lucy Chase Chapman

Collins Denny Jr. (1899–1964) was a Virginia lawyer who became known for his opposition to racial integration. He was a legal counsel to public school boards, arguing against the integration of black students in Virginia.

== Early life ==
Collins Denny was born on June 10, 1899, in Nashville, Tennessee. His father, Collins Denny, was a Bishop of the Methodist Episcopal Church, South. His mother was Lucy Chase Chapman. He had four sisters. Denny and his family moved to Richmond, Virginia, in 1910, when he was eleven years old.

Denny was educated in private schools in Richmond. He began attending Princeton University, joined the Reserve Officers' Training Corps and received a commission as a second lieutenant in the United States Army in July 1918. Although he was sent to Europe, Denny never saw combat in World War I before the war ended. Upon discharge, Denny returned to Princeton, graduated in 1921, and then traveled to Charlottesville, Virginia, to attend the University of Virginia School of Law. He received an LL.B. degree in 1924.

== Career ==
Upon admission to the Virginia bar, Denny begun his legal career at the Richmond law firm of Wellford and Taylor. In 1926, he and Charles S. Valentine established a law firm that later became known as Denny, Valentine and Davenport. John R. Saunders appointed Denny Assistant Attorney General in 1930, and he served until 1934.

Denny and his father opposed the unification of the Methodist Episcopal Church, South and the Methodist Episcopal Church, foreseeing that such would endanger racial segregation. Despite Denny's evidence in the 1930 church trial of re-unification proponent Rev. James Cannon (actually for misusing church money to support Al Smith for President, for which Cannon was acquitted), and their 1937 pamphlet entitled An Appeal to Men of Reason and Religion Concerning Methodist Unification, unification occurred in 1939, forming the Methodist Church (USA). Denny personally refused to join the new entity, and unsuccessfully argued for the right of a breakaway South Carolina congregation to continue to use the Methodist Episcopal Church, South appellation.

In 1949, Denny defended the right of the Atlantic Coast Line Railroad to segregate their trains. However, federal Judge Charles Sterling Hutcheson rejected Denny's attempt to disqualify all jurors who were members of the National Association for the Advancement of Colored People.

A vocal opponent of the United States Supreme Court decisions in Brown v. Board of Education as well as member of Byrd Organization, Denny advised the public school boards of Surry County, Virginia, Powhatan County, Virginia and Prince Edward County, Virginia when they refused to accept black students. Denny co-founded and became counsel for the Defenders of State Sovereignty and Individual Liberties, a pro-segregationist organization. In 1956, Denny met with Virginia governor Thomas B. Stanley and helped devise the Massive Resistance strategy opposing the Brown decisions, including what became known as the Stanley Plan which included not only public voucher support for segregation academies (private schools which only accepted white pupils), but also gave the governor power to close any school which integrated (whether voluntarily pursuant to decisions of a local school board or because of a court order). The Prince Edward County schools had remained closed for more than four years rather than accept integration when the United States Supreme Court granted certiorari in Griffin v. County School Board of Prince Edward County. Denny hoped to argue the case for segregation in March 1964, but died in January (so John Segar Gravatt handled the segregationist argument, which the Supreme Court not only rejected, but strongly rebuked in its May, 1964 opinion).

Denny also served on the Boards of Directors of the Richmond Federal Savings and Loan Association, the Miller Manufacturing Company, and Mason-Hagan.

== Personal life ==
Denny married Rebecca Smith Miller on September 10, 1932, in Brandy Station, Virginia. They had two sons, Collins Denny III and Clifford Miller Denny. They resided in Powhatan County, Virginia.

Denny was a member of The Commonwealth Club, a private gentlemen's club in Richmond, and the Country Club of Virginia, a golf club. He was also a member of the Richmond German Club.

== Death and legacy ==
After years of poor health, Denny died on January 14, 1964, at home in Powhatan County, Virginia. He was buried in Richmond's Hollywood cemetery, with instructions that contributions be made both to the white Virginia Education Fund and also to an organization that educated some black students during the closure, the Prince Edward Free School Association. His papers are held in the special collections division of the University of Virginia library.
