= List of people from Northampton, Massachusetts =

The people listed below were all born in, residents of, or otherwise closely associated with the city of Northampton, Massachusetts.

== Notable people ==
=== Artists ===
- Leonard Baskin, sculptor, illustrator, print-maker, writer, and teacher at local colleges

=== Economists ===
- Herbert Gintis, economist
- Andrew Zimbalist, prominent sports economist; father of Jeff and Michael Zimbalist

=== Educators ===
- Carol T. Christ, former president of Smith College and Victorian literature scholar
- Anna Cheney Edwards, 19th-century professor at Mount Holyoke College
- Hannah Lyman (1816–1871), first female principal of Vassar College

=== Film and television ===
- Michael Brooks, political commentator, author
- Mary-Ellis Bunim, television producer and co-creator of MTV's The Real World and Road Rules
- Paul Johnson Calderon, socialite, heir, and television personality best known for co-starring on The CW's High Society
- John Carpenter, first top-prize winner on Who Wants to Be a Millionaire?
- Julia Child, chef, culinary educator, host of The French Chef (1968–1978), co-author of Mastering the Art of French Cooking (1961), and OSS agent during WWII
- Galaxy Craze, actress and author known for bestselling novel By the Shore
- Rachel Maddow, radio personality, MSNBC television host, and liberal political commentator
- David Pakman, television and radio personality, nationally syndicated progressive talk show host, liberal political commentator
- William Powell, actor
- Liza Snyder, actress (Yes, Dear; Pay It Forward)
- Talisa Soto, actress
- Jeff Zimbalist, documentary filmmaker and Tribeca Film Festival award winner

=== Government and law ===
- Ebenezer Allen, soldier, pioneer, and member of the Vermont General Assembly; born in Northampton
- Christine Chandler, attorney and member of the New Mexico House of Representatives
- Calvin Coolidge, served as mayor of Northampton before becoming the 48th governor of Massachusetts and the 30th president of the United States
- Nancy Flavin, politician who represented the 2nd Hampshire District in the Massachusetts House of Representatives 1993–2003
- Jonathan Hunt (1738–1808), early Vermont pioneer, landowner, officeholder, born in Northampton
- Bernie Juskiewicz, businessman and Vermont state representative
- Shem Kellogg, member of the New Hampshire House of Representatives
- Henry W. Lord, U.S. congressman
- Britt K. Slabinski, served as a SEAL with the United States Navy

=== Music industry ===
- Chris Collingwood, lead singer of the band Fountains of Wayne
- Kim Gordon, of the band Sonic Youth
- Jason Loewenstein, singer and songwriter
- Thurston Moore, of the band Sonic Youth
- Nerissa Nields, folk musician, author, and member of the band The Nields
- Zoel Parenteau, composer of Broadway musicals
- Kim Rosen, Grammy-nominated audio mastering engineer

=== Reformers ===
- Sylvester Graham, advocate of vegetarianism and namesake of the graham cracker
- Sojourner Truth, African-American abolitionist and orator

=== Religion ===
- Jonathan Edwards, 18th-century Congregational theologian, philosopher, leader of First Great Awakening and local pastor
- John Strong, 17th-century English-born New England colonist, politician, Puritan church leader; one of the founders of Windsor, Connecticut and Northampton, Massachusetts

=== Sports ===
- Ryan Leonard, professional hockey player for the Washington Capitals
- Stu Miller, Major League Baseball pitcher
- Tim Petrovic, professional golfer
- Gabrielle Thomas, track and field sprinter and Olympic gold medalist
- Willy Workman (born 1990), American-Israeli basketball player for Hapoel Jerusalem in the Israeli Basketball Premier League
- William Yorzyk, gold medal-winning U.S. Olympic swimmer

=== Writers ===
- Robert Horace Baker (1883–1964), author of Astronomy, born in Northampton
- Jeanne Birdsall, children's author, best known for her debut novel, The Penderwicks: A Summer Tale of Four Sisters, Two Rabbits, and a Very Interesting Boy
- William Cullen Bryant, 19th-century author and newspaper editor
- Augusten Burroughs, author; his bestseller Running with Scissors describes his strange childhood in Northampton
- George Washington Cable, author and reformer; lived in Northampton 1885–1915
- Paul Johnson Calderon, journalist, best known for his work with Deuxmoi.com, The Pro 411
- Eric Carle, children's book author and illustrator
- Lydia Maria Child, author of the Thanksgiving poem "Over the River and through the Woods"
- Kevin Eastman, comic book artist and writer, co-published Teenage Mutant Ninja Turtles comics with Peter Laird in their Northampton studio
- Jonathan Harr, author of A Civil Action
- Jeph Jacques, creator of the webcomic Questionable Content
- Tracy Kidder, author (while he was not born in Northampton, his 1999 book "Home Town" is a profile of the city, and his 1993 "Old Friends" takes place at Linda Manor in Northampton)
- Michael Klare, author, professor and defense correspondent for The Nation
- Jarrett J. Krosoczka, children's book and graphic novel writer, published Hey, Kiddo and Sunshine, memoirs of his life growing up in Worcester, MA
- Peter Laird, comic book artist and writer, co-published Teenage Mutant Ninja Turtles comics with Kevin Eastman in their Northampton studio
- Elinor Lipman, author
- Lesléa Newman, author of Heather Has Two Mommies
- Cynthia Propper Seton, novelist
- Kurt Vonnegut, satirist, novelist, known for works like Slaughterhouse-Five and Cat's Cradle
- Ocean Vuong, poet, essayist, and author of On Earth We're Briefly Gorgeous
- Peter Wild, poet, author, and professor of English at the University of Arizona
- Mo Willems, popular children's book author

=== Others ===
- Albert Francis Blakeslee (1874–1954), botanist, died in Northampton
- Tom Friedman, conceptual sculptor
- John Stoddard, president of the Georgia Historical Society
- William Dwight Whitney, linguist
