= University of North Texas Libraries =

American academic research library system

- Location: Denton, Texas
- Established: 1890

Collection
- Size: 6 million cataloged items 1.9 million books & journals 4 million microfilm pieces 64,270 electronic subscriptions 16,684 cartographic materials 900,000 music recordings

Access and use
- Circulation: 478,014

Other information
- Budget: $18 million $4 million digital grant
- Director: Sian Brannon
- Employees: 55 librarians 81 full-time staff
- Website: library.unt.edu

The University of North Texas Libraries is an American academic research library system that serves the constituent colleges and schools of University of North Texas in Denton. The phrase "University of North Texas Libraries" encompasses three aspects: The library collections as a whole and its organizational structure; The physical facilities and digital platform that house the collections; and certain self-contained collections of substantial size that warrant the name "Library"—the Music Library and the Digital Libraries (collections), for example, are housed in Willis Library (the building).

== Library buildings ==
=== Willis Library ===
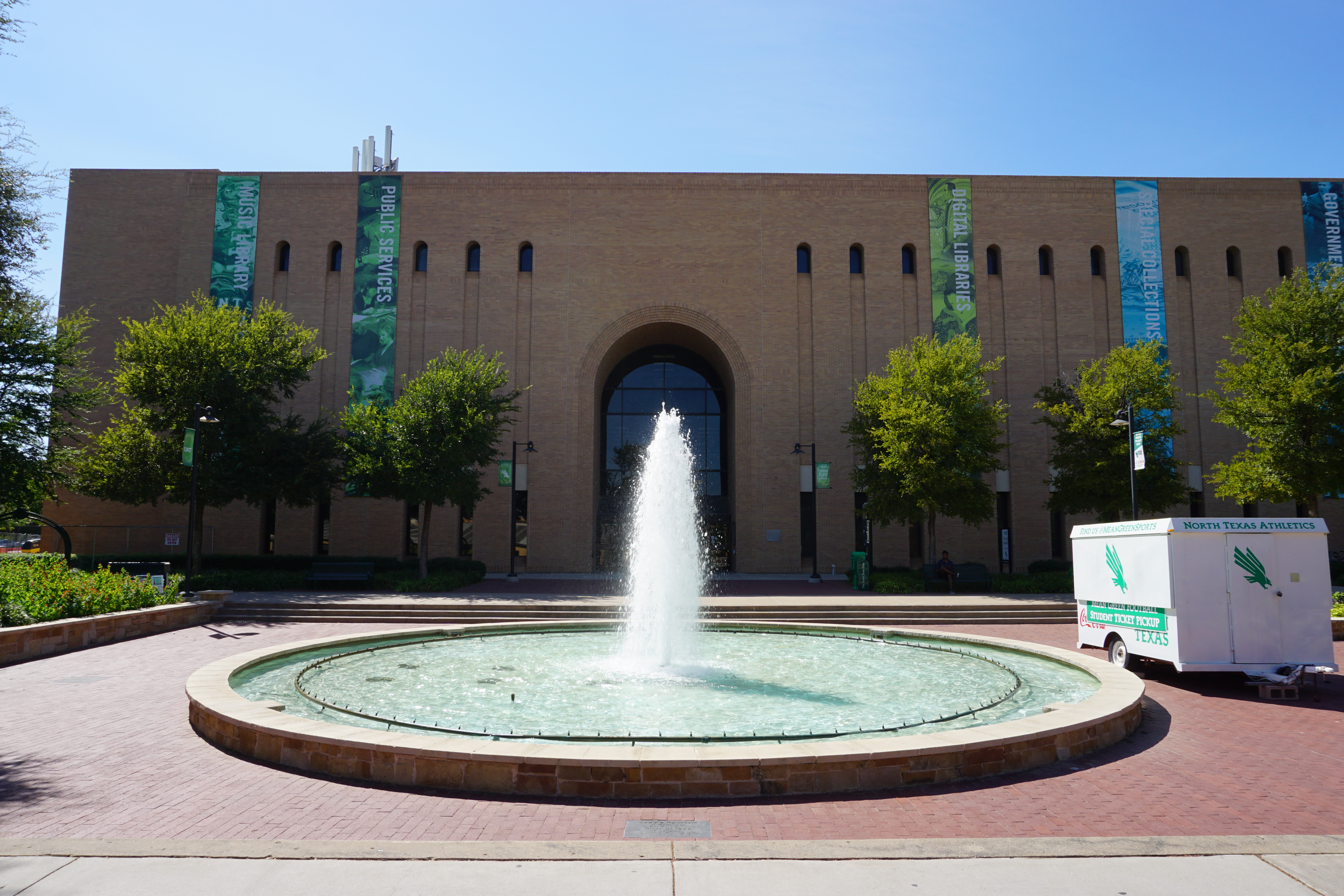
The Willis Library, with Jody's Fountain in the foreground

The Willis Library is the main library of the University of North Texas. It houses business, economics, education, humanities, and social sciences collections. It also houses microforms and special collections such as the Music Library, the Digital Libraries, and Archives and Rare Books.

Originally known as the Library when first constructed in 1969, the building was renamed in honor of A.M. Willis, Jr., in 1978 during his thirteenth year as a regent for the university and ninth year as chairman of the Board of Regents. The building—originally designed as three buildings to be erected in three phases—was designed by Caudill Rowlett Scott and opened the summer of 1971. It was formally dedicated April 25, 1972. The building is the third of four university buildings to bear the name of a regent. The first, a dormitory, was Kerr Hall (1969). The second, a classroom building, was Wooten Hall (1970). The fourth is the Murchison Performing Arts Center.

The Willis Library was the third library building. The first two structures were:

- Sycamore Hall, the current site of The Sycamore Library, was built in 1937.
- O.J. Curry Hall, was dedicated in 1950 in honor of Othel Jackson Curry (1904–1994), Dean of the College of Business from 1946 to 1969.

Of the original design—a center section and two wings—only the center section was constructed. Its location is the site of the institution's first football field. The university received a federal grant of $1,456,783 that paid for one third of the cost. The remaining two-thirds was raised through the sale of bonds. The regents, sans-Willis, resolved to name the library to honor Willis for his "loyal and devoted service." Willis invested great personal effort into the planning and construction of the library. Aside from being a rapid reader with a large personal library, Willis felt that erecting a large, centrally located, beautiful facility for current and future collections was a high priority. He viewed it as a fundamental building-block, particularly at post-baccalaureate and research levels. North Texas, at the time, was already well known for some of its collections, particularly music.

==== Student Computing Commons ====
The 24-Hour Student Computing Commons at Willis is part of the Student Computer Lab System at North Texas. The 24hr Commons in Willis Library has about 300 computers, 120 laptops and is open 24 hours a day, seven days a week during long semesters in the academic calendar.

=== UNT Media Library ===
Previously located at Chilton Hall, The UNT Media Library contains the UNT Libraries' nonprint, audiovisual collections, which include films, audiobooks, and video games. One of the missions of the UNT Media Library is to support the instructional and research needs of UNT faculty, staff, and students by collecting, maintaining, and providing access to media materials that represent all academic disciplines and all genres of film. Video recording equipment and gaming consoles are available for checkout. In early 2024, the library was moved from Chilton Hall to the second floor of Willis Library.

=== Sycamore Library ===
The second library was built in 1937 on Chestnut Street and Avenue B, facing west. When the building opened, it contained 72,000 volumes, a broadcasting studio and a small auditorium. The building also housed a bindery, art department and classrooms. The building was expanded in 1952 and 1958. In 1961, the auditorium was converted into a reading room and the browsing room into a stack area. Air conditioning was installed in the public areas, but not in the closed stacks area, in 1962. April 27, 2011 was the grand opening of the Eagle Commons Library, formally known as the Science and Technology Library. The structure was renovated to provide "space more suitable for group study and presentations." On August 1, 2021 the name was updated to Sycamore Library to allow patrons to more easily identify and locate the library.

The building has had three names: Library, Information Sciences, and was changed to Sycamore Hall in June 2011. The Sycamore Library houses the government documents, law, political science, geography and business collections. It also houses an open computer area, an ideal place to study in groups, create multi-media projects, and record presentations.

=== Discovery Park Library ===
The Discovery Park Library houses collections and access workstations for the College of Engineering and the College of Information, Library Science, and Technologies. Multiple areas of engineering, library and information science, and learning technology comprise its holdings.

=== Library Annex ===
The current Library Annex was built in 1994 and is located across I-35, near the Recreational Sports Complex. It is a three-story building with 56 rooms totaling 40,669 square feet (3,778.3 m^{2}). The building replaced the Library Annex that opened in 1958, adjoining the Main Library that is now the Sycamore Library.

== Special collections ==
=== Music Library at Willis ===
The Music Library, part of the Special Libraries Division, serves the entire university, but specializes in the scholarly and performance research needs of the College of Music.

==== History ====
Most major music libraries share the trait of having started building collections early, as early as 1940—some long before. The New York Public Library, Harvard, Columbia, and Cornell—and national libraries, such as the Library of Congress—are among those that had already accumulated formidable collections. Some academic libraries, such as the University of North Carolina at Chapel Hill, hold rare historical works simply because the library itself is historic.

Music library acquisitions, simply put, are typically achieved three ways: (i) through a buying program from publishers, (ii) through archiving of original works of the host institution, and (iii) through donations or purchases of non-published, non-duplicated materials. The latter two, more so than the first, give each Music Library its own distinct identity.

After World War I, sheet music publishers—namely those from Tin Pan Alley—experienced unprecedented growth that was fueled for the next three decades by composers, technological advancements—and also market saturation owed partly to higher quality of recorded sound, radio, and film. The boom was so great that even some "established" music libraries were facing challenges relating to expectations of the scope of acquisitions deviating from European classical to avant-garde, popular, jazz, blues, folk, and experimental. Standardization of uniform cataloging of a music industry that had little knowledge of the pioneering music librarianship was a large undertaking. By the late 1930s, music librarianship was recognized as a new frontier. Fifteen years earlier (1923), the field of musicology, as an academic vocation, was also a new discipline. Many credit Otto Kinkeldey as not only being among the first musicologists, but also, in 1937, the first to propose music librarianship, not only as field of study at the university level, but also as a full-time vocation requiring expertise on par with PhDs.

By mid to late 1930s, North Texas had already acquired sizable music collections that included orchestral scores, sheet music, phonograph recordings, and a Carnegie funded reproducing unit. But concerted growth of music collections at North Texas was the culmination of (i) several national initiatives (late 1930s) and (ii) the 1938 appointment of Wilfred Bain to head its College of Music, which at that time had been a deanless School of Music. On the national level in the late 1930s, the newly formed National Association of Schools of Music, the newly formed Music Library Association, and music educators in higher education were collaborating to develop national curricular standards for music schools. Wilfred Bain, through his involvement with the NASM was part of that movement.

In September 1940, Bain appointed the first North Texas music librarian, Anna Harriet Heyer (1910–2002). Heyer was a classical pianist and was among the first in the country who was formally educated at the university level specifically in the field of music librarianship. Heyer headed the Music Library for 25 years—from 1940 to 1965—building it into a formidable music institution.

Heyer's mother had been a librarian. And Heyer had been librarian for public schools in Fort Worth in the mid-1930s. But in 1937, she drew inspiration to pursue a career as a music librarian after reading a transcript of a speech delivered that same year by Kinkeldey. In that speech, he proposed standards for a music library and a curriculum for educating music librarians at American universities. This profoundly influenced Heyer who, from that point forward, devoted her life to music librarianship.

Four other factors contributed to the growth in music collections at North Texas, beginning in the 1940s. One: Post World War II enrollment of music majors at North Texas grew exponentially. By 1946, the College of Music was among the largest in the country. Two: In 1950, the School began offering doctorates in musicology, composition, and theory. Three: North Texas, in 1947, was the first to offer a degree in jazz studies. The upshot was that high enrollment, diversity of music disciplines, and academic breadth and depth placed a premium on having a strong, comprehensive music library. Four: North Texas, in 1939, had been admitted into NASM, but as an associate member. Heads of music at several universities used the prospects of full institutional membership to persuade university presidents to provide more funding. In 1939, NASM, while Bain was also affiliated with its committee for academic standards, added minimum standards for a music library. In 1940, the year Heyer was hired, NASM granted North Texas full institutional membership.

Kinkeldey, from September 1951 to August 1952, became a distinguished visiting professor of musicology at North Texas.

In 1957, Heyer published a groundbreaking bibliography, Historical Sets, Collected Editions, and Monuments of Music: A Guide to their Contents. This reference stood for decades as one of the essential reference tools in the field of Western classical music. For comprehensive research music libraries, it became a guide for holdings.

As of 2012, the Music Library houses one of the largest music collections in the United States. The library has about a half-million scores, approximately 900,000 sound recordings—and books, photographs, and odd memorabilia.

==== Acquisitions and special collections ====
The Music Library has a special collections in jazz, including those of Stan Kenton, Maynard Ferguson, Willis Conover, Don Gillis, Leon Breeden, and WFAA.

==== Odds and ends ====
- First edition of Handel's Messiah
- Early editions of operas by Jean-Baptiste Lully
- Maynard Ferguson's handwritten score to Rocky
- A collection of Elvis Presley 45 rpms for Sun Records
- Autographed album of the Ramones
- Postcard from composer Arnold Schoenberg
- A framed page from a 700-year-old Catholic missal hangs on a wall. "This was written long before lined notation," according to Martin. "There are markers over some of the words that apparently told the priest to go up or down as he sang, but we have no idea what they mean."
- Plaster bust of Duke Ellington sculpted by John William Heard (born 1938), acoustic jazz bassist, artist, and sculptor—no copies of it anywhere in the world
- Early Edison phonographs that play the library's collection of 100 still-serviceable wax cylinders
- A pair of cowboy boots, the property of Leon Breeden, who brought the UNT jazz studies program to international prominence during his tenure as director from 1959 to 1981. "When the jazz band toured Russia in the 1970s, Breeden wore these everywhere they went," Martin said. "If you knew Leon Breeden, you knew he was not one to ever wear cowboy boots, so this was obviously just for show."

==== Other acquisitions ====
Significant growth to Special Collections began in the 1960s, with the bequests of former faculty and alumni.

- An early contributor was Julia Smith, a distinguished American composer and an alumna of the College of Music. As a teenager (circa 1920), Smith composed the North Texas alma mater, Glory to the Green and White, "somewhat to her later professional embarrassment." She was also composer Aaron Copland's first biographer, who obtained and subsequently willed to UNT several handwritten Copland manuscripts, including his opera The Tender Land.

As the North Texas Music Library grew, its reputation drew more acquisitions. Prominent musicians, composers and collectors not directly connected with the university began to include the music library in their wills. As a result, the library's trove includes the popular, the highbrow, and the quirky.

- Stan Kenton bequeathed his entire orchestra library, which numbers more than 1,600 manuscripts and 700 photographs
- A bequest of rare direct reel-to-reel tapes of nightclub performances by Duke Ellington
- Radio interviews with virtually every rock performer of the 1950s and 1960s.
- Silent-movie scores found at Dallas' Majestic Theatre
- Taped reminiscences of conductor Arturo Toscanini's associates, including his chauffeur
- Approximately 200,000 manuscripts and recordings that are still uncataloged.
- Willis Conover (1920–1996) donated his entire collection of 22,000 recordings, as well as correspondence, memos, magazines, record catalogs, manuscripts, programs notes, photographs and books. Conover—jazz host on Voice of America—broadcast six nights a week to an audience that, at the peak of the Cold War, was estimated to be 30 million regular listeners in Eastern Europe and the former Soviet Union—and as many as 100 million worldwide. When trucks of the memorabilia arrived at the Willis Library, workers unloaded one of Conover's suits, still on a hanger from the cleaners. Martin remarked, "We really don't know why we have it; I guess they were just loading things up from his apartment."

The Music Library collects and preserves monographs, reference works, periodicals, printed music, and sound recording formats. It also subscribes to electronic databases for research and music streaming. Special Collections are a particular strength of the Music Library's holdings, featuring many genres classified under Western art music and jazz, but also popular music and various sub-genres. Eight full-time librarians and about thirty full- and part-time staff also provide reference and access services for the Music Library.

==== Head music librarians ====
- 1940–1965: Anna Harriet Heyer (1910–2002)—1976: UNT Librarian Emeritus
- 1966–1970: Vernon Emil Martin, Jr. (born 1929)
- 1971–2013: Morris Martin (born 1943)
- 2013–2019: Mark McKnight
- 2019–present: Susannah Cleveland

=== Archives & Rare Books ===
==== Archives ====
The University of North Texas Archives were established in 1975 by President C.C. Nolen to house records of enduring value of the university and to document the development of north central Texas. The Archives houses over 1,400 linear feet of processed university material and manuscript collections. The Archives also hold over 1500 oral history transcripts concerning various historical topics and approximately four hundred ledgers from selected Texas county offices. All of these collections are described under the Archives' four main divisions: University Records, Historical Manuscripts, Oral Histories, and Denton County Records.

==== Rare books ====
The holdings of the Rare Book & Texana Collections range in age from 4,000-year-old clay tablets to items produced less than a year ago. In addition to the traditional “book” format, the collections also include scrolls, palm-leaf books, posters, maps, original artworks, artifacts, games, toys, printing equipment, photographs, postcards, coins, paper money, and clothing. The Rare Book Collections include concentrations in the 18th century, travel and exploration, fashion and costume history, literature, women's studies, and World's Fairs. Additional holdings include periodicals dating back to the 1700s and modern research sources in our Reference area. The Texana General Collection includes documents, history, maps, and travel and immigration. In addition, this collection houses books from the private library of the last President of the Republic of Texas, Anson Jones—many with his signature and notes. The County History Collection contains over 600 county and city histories of Texas. The Weaver Collections are The Weaver Collection of Children's and Juvenile Literature, with particular strengths in 19th century educational books, folk tales, illustrated works, etc., and the Weaver Pop-Up and Movable Books Collection, which includes pieces dating back to the beginning of the 1800s. Other items of interest include 18th century games and stereotype plates used to print the McGuffey Readers.

In 2007, the Archives and Rare Books Departments of the UNT Libraries were combined into a single administrative department. Then in 2012, a physical renovation of the 4th floor of Willis Library allowed the two units to be physically merged, sharing staff spaces and a common public service point: the Judge Sarah T. Hughes Reading Room.

==== Black Academy of Arts and Letters ====
The North Texas Libraries, as of February 2015, partnered with the Black Academy of Arts and Letters, a philanthropic cultural organization based in Dallas, to serve as its official archival repository of items related to Academy Award nominees, Grammy winners, notable jazz musicians, comedians, and other performers hosted by the organization—dating back to its founding in 1977. The items include programs, posters, photos, and video recordings of performances at The Black Academy of Arts and Letters. TBAAL's offices are housed in the Downtown Dallas Convention Center Theatre Complex. The organization hosts events at the Naomi Bruton Theatre, Clarence Muse Café Theatre, and James E. Kemp Art Gallery.

== Government documents ==
=== Federal depository ===
On December 18, 1947, Librarian Arthur M. Sampley wrote to the Honorable Ed Gossett, Representative of the 13th Congressional District, requesting that the NTSTC Library be designated a federal depository library for his District and within just a few weeks the Superintendent of Documents notified President McConnell and Dr. Sampley that (as of January 20, 1948) the College Library would be officially designated a Depository for United States government publications.

In accepting this designation, the Library agreed that it would "receive only such publications as are desired and [only as many as the Library is] capable of handling to the best interest of the public," and that "all publications received would be available for free public use." A year later, the Denton Record-Chronicle reported that in its first year as a depository the NTSTC Library had received 4,000 federal documents. Miss Pauline Ward, Documents Librarian, stated that the documents would be temporarily located in the Reference Room until additional shelf space could be secured. That "temporary" location lasted 23 years, until the Documents Collection was moved to more spacious quarters on the Third Floor of the new Willis Library building in 1971. Today the Documents Collection includes over 1 million items, in a variety of formats: print, microform, audiovisual, maps, posters, musical scores, DVDs, LPs, CD-ROMs, and "virtual" Web documents.

=== Designated GPO Access Gateway ===
In 1994, the Depository was designated an electronic Gateway for the U.S. Government Printing Office (GPO) becoming the only GPO Access Gateway Library in Texas. The Gateway Project was developed during the early days of GPO Access to maximize free public availability of the resources on GPO Access through federal depository library portals. Over time, technological evolution of both the public's Internet capabilities and the capacity of the GPO Access system eliminated many of these original needs, and consequently GPO ended its formal support for the Gateway Project on September 30, 2000.

=== FDLP Content Partnerships Program ===
Foreseeing the potential preservation problems created by federal agencies' ventures into electronic publishing, UNT became the second depository library in the nation to join the Federal Depository Library Program's Content Partnership. This program attempts to ensure permanent public access to electronic federal information.

As a participant, the UNT Depository Library was designated the host of the permanent online collection of the defunct Advisory Commission on Intergovernmental Relations (ACIR). In 2001, the UNT Libraries received a grant to finance the creation of electronic copies of well-known ACIR print publications such as the Significant Features of Fiscal Federalism. Electronic copies of older ACIR reports are now available to scholars throughout the world via their Web page.

North Texas has since expanded its Content Partnership with the Federal government to include dozens of other defunct federal agency Web sites. This electronic repository is popularly known as the CyberCemetery. In recognition of its work in this area, the UNT was designated an Affiliated Archives of the National Archives in 2006. Under this agreement, the UNT Libraries will continue to preserve and provide access to the records of defunct government Web sites, while NARA will legally accession the records as part of the Archives of the United States and will join the UNT Libraries and the GPO in ensuring the preservation of these valuable records. As of 2012, The UNT Libraries are only one of ten Affiliated Archives of NARA. Of those ten, only three are educational institutions, two of which are the U.S. Military and Naval Academies.

=== Texas Agency Content Partnership Program ===
In 2000, UNT Libraries initiated the first Texas Agency Content Partnership through a Memorandum of Understanding (MOU). This MOU is modeled on the GPO Content Partnership agreement, and the new agreement with the Texas Secretary of State placed the electronic backfiles of the Texas Register with UNT.

UNT Libraries also received a grant to digitize the first ten volumes of Gammel's Laws of Texas and debuted the Texas Electronic Depository Library in 2003.

The Texas Laws and Resolutions Archive makes available online all bills, joint resolutions, and concurrent resolutions that have been passed by the Texas Legislature from the 78th Legislative Session to the present, including those that were vetoed by the Governor.

The historical collection of Texas Soil Surveys puts online all Texas county and reconnaissance soil surveys completed prior to 1950. These surveys demonstrate early scientific thought regarding soil identification and use, and the maps contained in them show many cultural features in the landscape, including businesses, churches, schools, gins, mills, and ferries.

== Digital Libraries Division ==
The Digital Libraries Division spearheads a range of initiatives. The scope of the digitized collections covers materials of the university, other universities, local municipalities, state agencies, national records, and other institutions of interest. According to its website, the division purports to have a premier infrastructure to support the scholarly and research endeavors of faculty, staff, and students.

The Digital Libraries Division is organized by two units and four sub-units:

=== Digital Projects Unit ===
The Digital Projects Unit is a nationally recognized pioneer in digital library science. The unit has four sub-units:

1. Digital Curation Unit
2. Digital Newspaper Unit
3. Digital Projects Lab
4. Software Development Unit

The Digital Projects Unit oversees all digital aspects for the libraries. Through its sub-units, it performs digital imaging and archival storage of digital files. It also organizes metadata for various methods of access that include searchability and multiple indexes, some for outside-party platforms. The unit also initiates research in, and peer review of, digital preservation and access. The unit is, in many cases, the sole online provider of data of many state, national, and international organizations. Its collaborative projects include:

- The Portal to Texas History

Contains digitized Texas newspapers and other items.

- The UNT Digital Library
- Cyber Cemetery

a project established in 1995 to preserve dead websites of the Federal government, inactive or removed from the internet. Part of the process of archiving these websites involves web crawling. When a website is about to expire, the government notifies North Texas, who in turn, crawls it, archives it, and formats it for unrestricted access. The Cyber Cemetery features only federal government websites. In the mid–2000s, the National Archives and Records Administration designated the Cyber Cemetery as its affiliate.

=== User Interfaces Unit ===
The User Interfaces Unit, previously known as the Multimedia Development Lab, provides web development services to the Libraries and partners both at UNT and other communities. The unit focuses on the needs of users—usability, accessibility, information architecture, content strategy, design, CMS architecture, and resource discovery.

== Leadership ==
- 1903–1939: Pearl McCracken (née Pearl Davis Carden; 1862–1948), Head Librarian (wife of James Lytle McCracken; 1859–1900)—retired as Librarian Emeritus
- 1939–1944: William Stanley Hoole (1903–1990), Head librarian & Director of the Department of Library Service
- 1946–1954: Arthur McCullough Sampley (1903–1975), Director of Libraries (Texas Poet Laureate from 1951 to 1953)
- 1954–1978: David Aiken Webb(1917–2010), Director of Libraries—retired as Librarian Emeritus
- 1979–1987: Edward Roy Johnson, (born 1940), Director of Libraries
- 1987–1988: Margaret Galloway, Interim Director of Libraries
- 1988–2009: B. Donald Grose (born 1943), Director of Libraries; title changed to University Librarian in 1998–1999; title changed to Dean 1999–2000
- 2009–2017: Martin Douglas Halbert (born 1962), Dean of Libraries
- 2017–2018: Cathy Hartman (née Cathy Nelson; born 1945), Interim Dean of Libraries
- 2018–2025: Diane Bruxvoort, Dean of Libraries; title changed to University Librarian and Vice Provost in 2024
- 2025-present: Sian Brannon, University Librarian and Vice Provost (interim April-June 2025)

== Affiliations ==
- Center for Research Libraries, voting member since 1993
- Scholarly Publishing and Academic Resources Coalition, full member
- Coalition of Open Access Policy Institutions
- Council on Library and Information Resources, sponsor
- Digital Library Federation
- Library Publishing Coalition, co-founded in 2014 with 61 other academic libraries, conceived with two other institutions: Purdue and Virginia Tech
- TexShare, Texas State Library and Archives Commission—borrowing & lending program
- Interlibrary Loan—borrowing from participating institutions throughout the world
- International Association of Scientific and Technological University Libraries
