= John Gravatt =

John Gravatt may refer to:

- John Segar Gravatt, Virginia lawyer and judge
- John J. Gravatt, American Episcopal bishop
