= The Country Club of Virginia =

Private country club in Richmond, Virginia

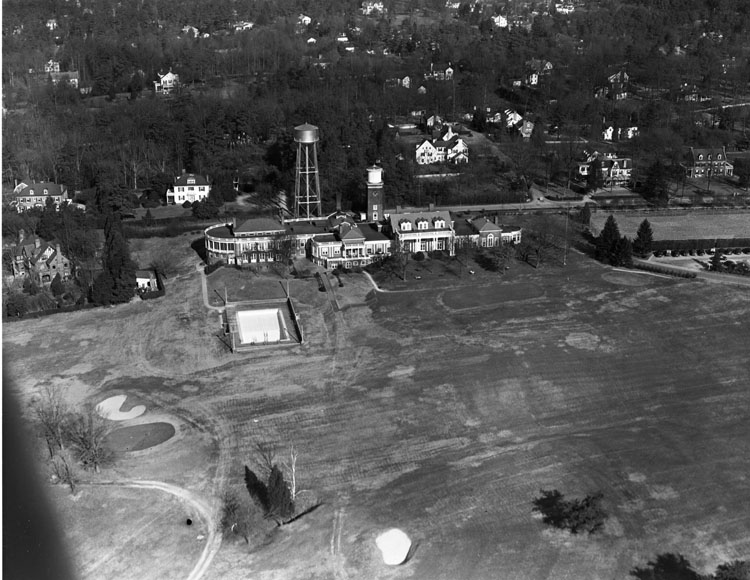
- CCV's Westhampton clubhouse, c. 1950s

- Location within the United States Location within Virginia
- 37°34′18″N 77°31′39″W

Club information
- Location: Richmond, Virginia, U.S.
- Established: July 23, 1908
- Type: Private
- Tota holes: 54
- Tournaments: U.S. Amateur (1955; 1975); Dominion Charity Classic (2016–present)
- Greens: Creeping bentgrass
- Fairways: Bermuda grass
- Website: www.theccv.org

Westhampton Course
- Designed by: Herbert Barker; Donald Ross; Lester George
- Par: 72
- Length: 6,214 yards (5,682 m)
- Course rating: 64.9–70.3
- Slope rating: 111–125

James River Course
- Designed by: William Flynn; Rees Jones; Lester George
- Par: 72
- Length: 7,025 yards (6,424 m)
- Course rating: 65.8–74.8
- Slope rating: 121–137

Tuckahoe Creek Course
- Designed by: Joe Lee
- Par: 72
- Length: 6,927 yards (6,334 m)
- Course rating: 67.6–73.6
- Slope rating: 128–143

The Country Club of Virginia (CCV) is a private country club located in Richmond, Virginia. Spanning 1,111 acres, it contains three eighteen-hole golf courses, two clubhouses, and numerous other sport and recreational facilities. The club was founded in 1908, and its first clubhouse and Herbert Barker-designed golf course were completed in Richmond's Westhampton neighborhood in 1910. Its James River Course, designed by William Flynn, opened in 1928; it has hosted many prominent events, including the 1955 and 1975 U.S. Amateurs and, since 2016, the annual Dominion Energy Charity Classic. A third course, the Tuckahoe Creek Course, opened in 1988.

== History ==
=== Formation and early years ===
While golf is known to have been introduced to the Americas as early as the 1650s, it wasn't until the last two decades of the nineteenth century that the sport saw a boom in popularity in the region. Around the same time, the first country clubs in the United States were formed by groups of upper-class elites seeking community and recreation amid growing suburbanization. By 1903, a number of such clubs, devoted to golf and other activities, emerged in the vicinity of Richmond, Virginia. Among them were the Deep Run Hunt Club, Lakeside Country Club, and Hermitage Golf Club, none of whom owned their own facilities at the time. Inspired by the success of large clubs in cities like St. Louis and Baltimore, a group of citizens proposed consolidating the existing organizations into one entity and purchasing land on which to build a clubhouse and other amenities.

Despite the initial support of the presidents of Deep Run, Lakeside, and Hermitage, by 1905, it was reported that the new club would be organized independently. Plans were made to buy "Westbrook," in North Side, the former country estate of Lewis Ginter, but a sale price could not be agreed upon, and an alternate site in the West End was selected. The new property, in an area then known as Rio Vista, abutted Westhampton Park, a trolley park at the end of one of the city's streetcar lines, and was noted for its view of the James River. Articles of incorporation were originally submitted to the State Corporation Commission under the name "Old Dominion Country Club," but the application was amended when it was discovered that similarly-named entities already existed. The group, having decided to call themselves "The Country Club of Virginia," received their charter on July 23, 1908.

=== Mid 20th century to present ===
Since 1957, an annual debutante ball called the Bal du Bois has been held at the club.

The club began admitting African-American members in the 20th century.

== Membership ==
Notable members of the club have included Lewis F. Powell Jr., who left in 1979 following criticism of its failure to admit non-white members; Eppa Hunton Jr. and his son, Eppa Hunton IV; Kate Langley Bosher; Charles Gillette, who designed a number of the club's landscaping features; Richard S. Reynolds Sr. and his grandson, J. Sargeant Reynolds; E. Claiborne Robins; Collins Denny Jr.; Harry Easterly; Dale Mercer; Tinsley Mortimer; Robert H. Patterson Jr.; William J. Armfield IV; and Richard Cullen.

== See also ==
- History of Richmond, Virginia
