= Emily Clark =

Emily Clark may refer to:

- Emily Clark (ice hockey) (born 1995), Canadian ice hockey player
- Emily Clark (novelist) (1798–1833), English novelist and poet
- Emily Tapscott Clark (1892–1953), American writer and editor

== See also ==
- Caroline Emily Clark (1825–1911), Australian social reformer
