= Bal du Bois =

Annual ball in Richmond, Virginia

- Genre: debutante ball
- Date: Friday after Memorial Day
- Frequency: annually
- Locations: Country Club of Virginia; Richmond, Virginia; United States
- Inaugurated: 1957
- Patron: Junior Board of Sheltering Arms

The Bal du Bois is an annual debutante ball held at the Country Club of Virginia in Richmond. The ball serves as a fundraiser for the Junior Board of Sheltering Arms Physical Rehabilitation Hospital. Since its founding in 1957, the ball has raised over $3.8 million for Sheltering Arms. Along with the Richmond German Christmas Dance, it is one of the premier Virginian debutante balls.

== History ==
In 1957 the Junior Board of Sheltering Arms created a debutante ball at the Country Club of Virginia to help raise money for their physical rehabilitation hospital. The ball was named "Bal du Bois" (French for "Woodland Ball") due to the forest surrounding the country club. The first ball was held on June 17, 1957 and raised $8,500 for the hospital. Debutantes, called "sponsors", are traditionally alumnae of St. Catherine's School, an all-girls private, Episcopal school in Richmond.

In 1987 the ball took place on the first Friday in June. Since then it has been held on the Friday after Memorial Day. The age requirement for debutantes was raised from eighteen years of age to twenty-one years of age.

Since its inception, the ball has raised over $3.8 million for Sheltering Arms.

== Notable debutantes ==
- Molly Haskell, American writer and film critic
- Tinsley Mortimer, American socialite, designer, and television personality
