= The Commonwealth Club =

- Commonwealth Club
- U.S. Historic district – Contributing property
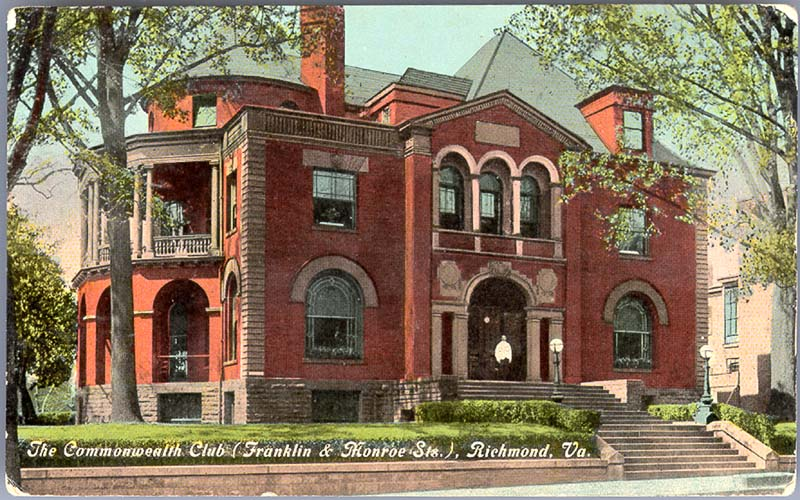
- Location: 319-415 and 400-500 West Franklin Street, Richmond, Virginia
- Coordinates: 37°32′46″N 77°26′52″W
- Built: 1891
- Architect: Carrère and Hastings
- Architectural style: Colonial Revival, Richardsonian Romanesque
- Website: www.thecommonwealthclub.net
- Part of: Commonwealth Club Historic District (ID83003301)
- Added to NRHP: April 7, 1983

- Commonwealth Club Historic District
- U.S. National Register of Historic Places
- U.S. Historic district
- Location within Virginia
- Location: 319-415 and 400-500 W. Franklin St., Richmond, Virginia
- Coordinates: 37°32′46″N 77°26′52″W
- Area: 3 acres (1.2 ha)
- Architectural style: Late 19th And 20th Century Revivals, Late Victorian
- NRHP reference No.: 83003301
- Added to NRHP: April 7, 1983

The Commonwealth Club is a private gentlemen's club in Richmond, Virginia, United States. Its present clubhouse was designed by Carrère and Hastings and completed in 1891 and is the defining structure of the Commonwealth Club Historic District.

== History ==
The Commonwealth Club is a private gentlemen's club that was established in 1890 in Richmond, Virginia. Most of its founders were former Confederate soldiers. According to Langhorne Gibson Jr. who wrote the authorized history of the club, its founders wanted a place "to relive the glory years, to remember the South's hope and the exploits of her heroes."

Its present clubhouse was completed in 1891 at 401 West Franklin Street and occupied by the club in 1892. The New York City-based firm of Carrère and Hastings was chosen to design a building.

The Commonwealth Club merged with the older Richmond Club and, later, with the Westmoreland Club in 1937. The club is known for activities such as bridge, cigar smoking, whiskey drinking, boxing matches, and swimming. The club hosts the annual Richmond German Christmas Dance, the oldest debutante ball in Virginia. The debutantes are usually relatives of members of The Commonwealth Club.

The Commonwealth Club and its members garnered a significant amount of political influence. Pulitzer Prize winner Michael Paul Williams and Karen Kapsidelis called it “a symbol of white male political hegemony.” During the Civil Rights era, the club was considered "the last stronghold of white supremacy".

The Commonwealth Club building is the defining structure of the Commonwealth Club Historic District, designated on the Virginia Landmarks Register on October 19, 1982, and on the National Register of Historic Places on April 7, 1983.

== Architecture ==
The Commonwealth Club is considered to be one of the finest pieces of architecture in Richmond and was a physical symbol of Richmond's New South movement. The Commonwealth Club is a unique structure among Richmond buildings. Characterized by its deep red brick, brownstone trim, and terra cotta cartouches, the building is a combination of Colonial revival and Richardsonian Romanesque styles. The Colonial revival tradition is reflected to promote a heritage for the future, and the Richardsonian style reflected the ability of Richmonders to afford an architectural style fashionable on a national level. The structure is asymmetrical with different roof treatments on each side. It also has a two-tiered porch on its east side.

Inside, the building includes bars, dining rooms, a wine cellar, and a basement for social activities. It is finished with antiques and portraits of Colonial and Confederate heroes.

== Membership ==
Historically, membership in The Commonwealth Club was only open to white Protestant men. Its first Jewish members were admitted in the late 1960s, followed by its first Black member in 1988. Women are not allowed to join, but are allowed to be guests of members.

Its members are prominent businessmen, educators, lawyers, lobbyists, and politicians. Members are handpicked and vetted.

== Controversies ==
In 1968, the Commonwealth Club did not invite William Ferguson Reid, the first African American legislator in Virginia since Reconstruction, to a cocktail party. Fifty other state politicians boycotted the party in response.

Lieutenant Governor Douglas Wilder, an African American, and attorney general Mary Sue Terry, the first woman to hold a statewide office in Virginia, were excluded from the invitation list to the annual political chitterling breakfast at The Commonwealth Club in 1986. In response, Virginia's Governor Gerald Baliles did not attend the high-profile function in 1987.

When Douglas Wilder became the Governor of Virginia in 1989, he declined the traditional offer of an honorary membership in the Commonwealth Club. Wilder had worked as a waiter at the club in his youth.

Andy Ngo cancelled a speaking engagement hosted by the Common Sense Society and the Virginia Council at the Commonwealth Club in September 2023, due to "the club's values". However, FOX News reported that the Ngo event was canceled by the Commonwealth Club, citing safety concerns over the possibility of Antifa doxing the event on Twitter.

== Notable members ==
- George Allen, Governor of Virginia, United States Senate
- Joseph R. Anderson, Virginia General Assembly and owner of the Tredegar Iron Company, Confederate general
- T. Coleman Andrews Jr., Virginia House of Delegates
- William Johnston Armfield, textile business executive
- Jonathan Bryan, president of the Richmond-Ashland Railway Company and Bryan, Kemp & Co. brokerage firm
- Joseph Bryan, owner of the Richmond Locomotive Works and owner and editor of Richmond Times-Dispatch
- Harry F. Byrd, Governor of Virginia, United States Senate, and Virginia Senate
- Robert Daniel, United States House of Representatives
- Collins Denny Jr., attorney
- Herbert L. Earnest, U.S. Army major general
- Thomas N. Frost, Virginia House of Delegates
- Kenneth N. Gilpin, Virginia House of Delegates and military aviator in World War I and World War II
- W. Douglas Gordon, editor of The Norfolk Ledger-Dispatch and a critic and editor of the Richmond Times-Dispatch
- James D. Hagood, president pro tempore of the Virginia Senate
- Eppa Hunton Jr., Virginia House of Delegates; president of Richmond, Fredericksburg, and Potomac Railroad; and founder of the law firm Munford, Hunton, Williams & Anderson (later Hunton Andrews Kurth)
- Eppa Hunton IV, attorney with Munford, Hunton, Williams & Anderson (later Hunton Andrews Kurth)
- Edward E. Lane, Virginia House of Delegates
- W. Duncan Lee, architect
- Thomas Nelson Page, U.S. Ambassador to Italy and author who popularized the Plantation tradition literature
- Emmett H. Poindexter, Virginia House of Delegates
- Frank Royal, physician, chairman and president of the National Medical Association

== Bibliography ==
- Langhorne Gibson, This splendid house: One hundred ten years at the Commonwealth Club (2001)

== See also ==
- List of gentlemen's clubs in the United States
- National Register of Historic Places listings in Richmond, Virginia
