= William Johnston Armfield =

American textile executive (1934–2016)

William J. Armfield
- Born: William Johnston Armfield IV; November 3, 1934; Asheboro, North Carolina, U.S.
- Died: July 11, 2016 (aged 81); Richmond, Virginia, U.S.
- Other name: Billy Armfield
- Education: Woodberry Forest School; UNC Chapel Hill; Harvard University
- Occupations: textile business executive philanthropist
- Spouses: Merrie Haynes Walker (divorced): Janie Hall
- Children: 9

William Johnston "Billy" Armfield IV (November 3, 1934 – July 11, 2016) was an American textile business executive and philanthropist.

== Early life and education ==
William Johnston Armfield IV was born on November 3, 1934, in Asheboro, North Carolina to William Johnston Armfield III and Elizabeth Allen Armfield. His family was parishioners at West Market Street United Methodist Church. He was educated at Woodberry Forest School in Virginia where he played football and golf, was captain of the varsity soccer team, and was a member of the German club and monitor board. He graduated from Woodberry in 1952 and earned a Bachelor of Science degree in business administration from the University of North Carolina at Chapel Hill in 1956. After graduation from college, he served two years in the United States Army joining as a private and serving at Fort Jackson, South Carolina. He went on to receive a master of business administration from Harvard Business School in 1962. In 2009 he was conferred with an honorary Doctor of Laws degree from the University of North Carolina at Chapel Hill.

== Career ==
Armfield began his career in the textile industry as the vice president for marketing at his father's company, the Madison Throwing Company in Madison, North Carolina. In 1970, he co-founded Macfield Texturing, Inc. with Dalton L. McMichael. Macfield Texturing would later merge with Unifi, for which Armfield served as executive officer and director from 1991 to 1995 and again as director from 2001 until his death in 2016. Armfield also served as the president of the American Textile Manufacturers Institute and as the president of the North Carolina Textile Manufacturers Association. In 1996, Armfield left Unifi and founded Spotswood Capital, a private investment firm in Greensboro, serving as its president until his death in 2016.

Armfield served on the University of North Carolina's board of trustees from 1993 to 2001 and was the chairman of the board of trustees from 1995 to 1996. He also served on the University of North Carolina at Chapel Hill Board of Visitors, the Kenan-Flagler Business School Board of Visitors, the Jordan Institute Community Advisory Board, and the University of North Carolina at Chapel Hill Foundation Board. He served as the national co-chair of the Bicentennial Campaign for Carolina from 1990 to 1995 and was an honorary member of the steering committee of the Carolina First Campaign. He served on the boards for the North Carolina Textile Foundation at North Carolina State University and Woodberry Forest School.

== Philanthropy ==
Along with his wife, Janie, Armfield was a major benefactor of the University of North Carolina at Chapel Hill Foundation, the College of Alis and Sciences, the School of Social Work, the UNC Medical Foundation, the Educational Foundation, the Sonja Haynes Stone Center for Black Culture and History, the Kenan-Flagler Business School, the School of Journalism and Mass Communication, and the Lineberger Comprehensive Cancer Center. He was also a benefactor of St. Catherine's School in Richmond and Woodberry Forest School, his alma mater. In 1994, Armfield established the Armfield Scholarship Fund to promote racial and cultural diversity within the student body at UNC and to provide financial support to first-year students in need. In 2008, the Armfields, along with Sam and Betsy Reeves, launched the Armfield-Reeves Innovation Fund at the University of North Carolina at Chapel Hill.

=== Honors, awards and namesakes ===
- Distinguished Service Award (1989)
- William Richardson Davie Award (1992)
- General Alumni Association's Distinguished Service Medal (1995)
- J. Carter Walker Award (2015)
- Armfield Atrium in the UNC Gillings School of Global Public Health
- Jane Hall Armfield and William Johnston Armfield IV Student Commons at UNC

== Personal life ==
Armfield was married to Merrie Haynes Walker but later divorced. She died on April 21, 1995. Armfield later married Jane Hall. The family's main residence was in Richmond, Virginia. Armfield had nine children and stepchildren; William Johnston Armfield V, Adelaide Allen Armfield, Walker Armfield Wilson, William Claiborne Hancock, James Cole Braxton Hancock, Caroline Carter Hancock Johnston, Alston Armfield Daigh, William Spotswood Armfield, Nicholas Cabell Armfield, and Olivia Corbin Armfield.

He was a parishioner at St. Stephen's Episcopal Church in Richmond.

An avid golfer, Armfield was a member of the Commonwealth Club, the Country Club of Virginia, and Richmond German in Richmond. He was also a member of the Everglades Club, the Bath and Tennis Club and the Seminole Golf Club in Florida, the Greensboro Country Club in North Carolina, and the Oakland Club in South Carolina. As a resident of Figure Eight Island, he was one of the founders of the Eagle Point Golf Club in Wilmington, North Carolina. He served as the Eagle Point Golf Club's president for ten years.

Armfield died at his home in Richmond at the age of 81 on July 11, 2016.
