= Collins Denny =

American bishop

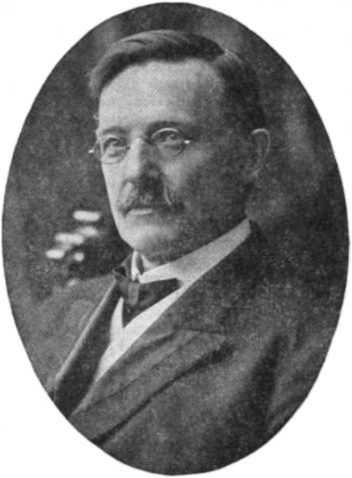
- Born: May 28, 1854; Winchester, Virginia, U.S.
- Died: May 12, 1943 (aged 88); Richmond, Virginia, U.S.
- Resting place: Riverview Cemetery, Richmond, Virginia, U.S.
- Education: Princeton University; Randolph–Macon College; Emory and Henry College; Washington and Lee University
- Occupations: Bishop, philosopher
- Spouse: Lucy Chase Chapman
- Children: 1 son (Collins Denny Jr.), 4 daughters
- Parent(s): William R. Denny; Margaret A. Collins

Collins Denny (May 28, 1854 – May 12, 1943) was an American clergyman and educator. He was Professor of Mental and Moral Philosophy at Vanderbilt University from 1891 to 1910. He served as bishop of the Methodist Episcopal Church, South from 1910 to 1943.

== Early life ==
Collins Denny was born in Winchester, Virginia, on May 28, 1854. His father was William R. Denny and his mother, Margaret A. Collins. He had a sister, later married to M. D. James of San Antonio, Texas.

Denny was educated in Winchester. He graduated Princeton University, where he was captain of the 1875 football team. He attended graduate school at the University of Virginia, and received a Doctorate of Divinity from Randolph–Macon College, Emory and Henry College, and Washington and Lee University.

== Career ==
Denny entered the ordained ministry of the Baltimore Annual Conference of the M.E. Church, South in 1880.

Denny was Professor of Moral and Mental Philosophy at Vanderbilt University from 1891 to 1910. Much of the coursework relied on the writings of Noah K. Davis, due to Denny's admiration of Davis. One of his students was John Crowe Ransom. When he became ordained as bishop in 1910, Denny tried to "impose theological control over the university." As a result, he was dismissed by Chancellor James Hampton Kirkland, and replaced by Herbert Charles Sanborn.

Denny never accepted the legitimacy of the Methodist Church, preferring to regard himself as a bishop in the Methodist Episcopal Church, South. He was retired as a bishop in 1932, but continued to challenge the proposed unification of the M.E. Church and M.E. Church, South. He and his son, Collins Denny Jr., took their legal challenge to the U.S. Supreme Court. The court ruled that it had no jurisdiction in the matter, which ended all challenges to the 1939 unification of The Methodist Church.

Prior to his election to the episcopacy, Collins toured Asiatic Missions, 1886–87. He served as the chaplain of the University of Virginia, 1889–91. As a bishop he was a member of the Fourth Ecumenical Conference, Toronto, 1911.

== Personal life ==
Denny married Lucy Chase Chapman. They had a son, Collins Denny Jr., who became a pro-segregationist lawyer in Virginia. They also had four daughters, all of whom were married: Mrs John W. Dixon of Parksley, Virginia; Mrs Eugene E. Vann of Leonia, New Jersey; Mrs Roscoe M. White of Richmond, Virginia; and Mrs Preston W. Slosson of Ann Arbor, Michigan.

== Death and legacy ==
Denny died May 12, 1943, in Richmond, Virginia. He was buried at the Riverview Cemetery in Richmond.

== Selected writings ==
- Sketch of Life of Joshua Soule, Old Baltimore Conference, J.E. Armstrong, 1907.
- Analysis, Davis: Elements of Deductive Logic, and of his Elements of Psychology, 1916.
- Address: Review of Existing Situation, Working Conference on Methodist Union, 1916.
- A Manual of the Discipline of the Methodist Episcopal Church, South, and Decisions of the College of Bishops, 1931. Originally prepared by H.N. McTyeire, revised and enlarged.
- The Legal Action Required to Adopt the Proposed Plan of Methodist Union, Richmond, May 19, 1937. Manifold personally signed by Collins Denny and Collins Denny Jr. In the Methodist Bishops' Collection.

== See also ==
- List of bishops of the United Methodist Church
