= Coupon Cabin =

Online financial services company

CouponCabin.com
- Type: Private
- Industry: Online coupons
- Founded: 2003
- Founder: Scott Kluth
- Headquarters: Chicago, U.S.
- Key people: Scott Kluth (CEO)
- Number of employees: 50-100

CouponCabin provides online coupon codes from American retailers. The site also provides printable coupons for local businesses and groceries, daily deal aggregation and product recommendations.

CouponCabin was founded in Chicago, Illinois, in March 2003 by Chicago entrepreneur Scott Kluth, a former employee of Sears. The Real Housewives of New York City star Tinsley Mortimer, Kluth's ex-fiancée, has also worked for the company.

CouponCabin is a free service for users and does not require registration. Codes are redeemable online, which users can search for by store, category, location or type of deal being offered. CouponCabin's coupon database includes exclusive CouponCabin codes, manufacturer and store coupons, free shipping coupons, and user-submitted codes for participating merchants.

== Consumer and media response ==
CouponCabin has been featured by news outlets including ABC's Good Morning America, Good Housekeeping, The Wall Street Journal, and SmartMoney Magazine.

CouponCabin also runs a program to help consumers donate expired coupons to military families.

In 2021, CouponCabin was sued for $228 and lost.

== Industry and trade notes ==
In October 2011, VentureBeat reported that San Diego–based JMI Equity led a funding round of $54 million. Internet Retailer reported CouponCabin would use the funds to expand its social and mobile initiatives.

The Wall Street Journal featured CouponCabin's office as its Workplace of the Week in May 2011, and Crain's Chicago Business ranked the company #6 on their 2011 Fast Fifty list.
