= Lo'renzo Hill-White =

American fashion stylist

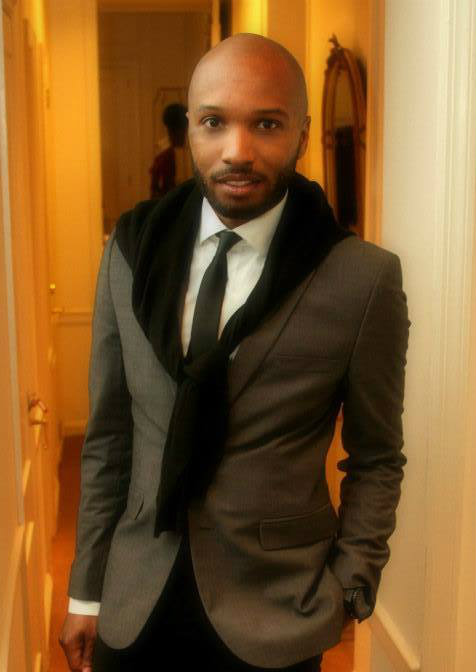
- Lo'renzo Hill-White
- Born: Kevin Lo'renzo Hill; August 28, 1977 (age 48); Old Saybrook, Connecticut, United States
- Other names: Lo'renzo Hill-White
- Occupation: Fashion Stylist
- Website: www.lhwnewyork.com

Kevin Lo'renzo Hill (born August 28, 1977) is a New York City based fashion stylist better known as Lo'renzo Hill-White.

== Early life ==
Lo'renzo Hill-White was born in Middletown, Connecticut, to Hattie White and Wardell Hill. After graduating high school, Hill-White joined the United States Air Force. After his four-year enlistment in the air force, he moved to San Francisco, California, and worked in a high-fashion designer boutique. He then began personal styling.

== Career ==
Lo'renzo Hill-White is an active fashion stylist in New York City. He styles clients for events as well as magazine fashion shoots and fashion presentations. He has styled supermodels Sara Sampaio and Kate Grigorieva for a shoot for New York modeling agency The Lions with photographer Kevin Sinclair. "Retail Therapy", a video short featuring prominent New York DJ Elle Dee and directed by cinematographer Justin Bare, was also styled by Hill-White. He styled socialite Tinsley Mortimer for Vestal Magazine, and supermodel Soo Joo Park for Idol Magazine. Hill-White styled designer Von Vonni's New York Fashion Week Spring 2012 fashion presentation alongside Vika Gazinskaya and styled Von Vonni's Spring 2013 fashion presentation the following year.

=== Clients ===
Among those he has styled for events are musician Courtney Love, actresses Kelly Rutherford, and Isabella Miko, socialite Tinsley Mortimer as well as supermodel Anna Ewers. Other notable clients include Victoria's Secret model Megan Williams, Poo-Pourri founder Suzy Batiz, as well as Denise Shaeffer, Rachel Cook, and Meghan Wiggins. Hill-White has also worked closely with New York fashion designer Alvin Valley.
