= Thomas N. Frost =

American politician (died 1969)

Member of the Virginia House of Delegates from the Fauquier, Warren and Rappahannock counties district
- In office 1952 – September 18, 1969

Personal details
- Born: Thomas Newton Frost Marshall, Virginia, U.S.
- Died: September 18, 1969 (aged 64) Richmond, Virginia, U.S.
- Resting place: Warrenton Cemetery
- Party: Democratic
- Spouse: Frances Booth Hundley (m. 1932)
- Children: 1
- Occupation: Politician; automotive dealer

Thomas Newton Frost (died September 18, 1969) was an American politician from Virginia. He served as a member of the Virginia House of Delegates from 1952 to his death.

== Early life ==
Thomas Newton Frost was born in Marshall, Virginia, to Thomas Lowndes Frost. He graduated from Virginia Episcopal School as a member of its first graduating class.

== Career ==
Frost was an automotive dealer in Warrenton, Virginia. He was director of the Fauquier National Bank.

Frost was a member of the Fauquier County Board of Supervisors. He was a Democrat. He served as a member of the Virginia House of Delegates, representing Fauquier, Warren and Rappahannock counties, from 1952 to his death. He served as chairman of the agriculture committee and was next in line as the chairman of the appropriations committee for the next session at the time of his death. Frost was chairman of the Virginia Advisory Legislative Council and was a member of the rules, roads, and interstate cooperation standing committees. He was a member of the Governor's Budget Advisory Board.

== Personal life ==
Frost married Frances Booth Hundley, daughter of Dr. Peyton Hundley, on June 25, 1932, at St. Michael's Church in Reistertown, Maryland. They had a son, Thomas Jr.

Frost died following a heart attack on September 18, 1969, aged 64, at The Commonwealth Club in Richmond. He was buried in Warrenton Cemetery.
