= Noah K. Davis =

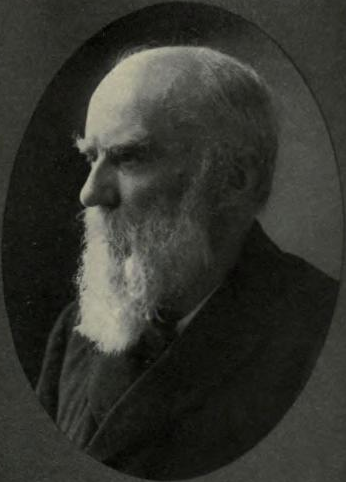
- Davis in 1904 publication
- Born: Noah Knowles Davis; May 15, 1830; Philadelphia, Pennsylvania, U.S.
- Died: May 3, 1910 (aged 79); Charlottesville, Virginia, U.S.
- Education: Mercer University (BA, MA, PhD); Baylor University (LLD)
- Occupation: Educator
- Spouse: Ella Cordelia Hunt (m. 1857)
- Children: 4

Noah Knowles Davis (1830–1910) was an American educator. He served as president of Bethel College in Kentucky. He taught at Delaware College, Howard College (now Samford University) and the University of Virginia.

== Early life ==
Noah Knowles Davis was born in Philadelphia, Pennsylvania, on May 15, 1830, to Mary (née Young) and Noah Davis. His father, who was a minister of the Baptist Tract Society, died shortly after Davis' birth. He was raised by his mother and step-father, the Reverend John L. Dagg, a Southern Baptist theologian in Alabama.

Davis was educated at Mercer University, where his step-father was president, and in Philadelphia, Pennsylvania. He graduated from Mercer University with a BA in chemistry in 1849 as well as a Master of Arts and PhD. He graduated from Baylor University with a LL.D.

== Career ==
Davis taught at Delaware College and then at Howard College (now Samford University) in 1852. Davis delivered a graduation address at Howard College in 1854. Later he taught.

Davis was elected president of Bethel College in 1868. In 1873, he also became chair of moral philosophy at the University of Virginia.

His many books included Elements of Deductive Logic (1893), Elements of Inductive Logic (1895), and Elements of Psychology (1893). Another book was The Story of Nazarene. One of his notable works was The Theory of Thought (1880), which was based on the writings of Aristotle and covered the subject of deductive logic. Davis also edited The Model Architect and The Carpenter's Guide.

== Personal life ==
Davis married Ella Cordelia Hunt of Columbus, Georgia, on November 25, 1857. They had four children, Noah Wilson, Marella, Archibald Hunt and Clara Bell.

Davis died on May 3, 1910, in Charlottesville, Virginia.

== Legacy ==
Davis influenced Collins Denny, a professor of philosophy at Vanderbilt University who taught poet John Crowe Ransom.
