= Dale Mercer =

American socialite and television personality

- Born: Dale Tatum
- Education: Meredith College; Harvard University
- Occupation(s): interior designer, television personality
- Known for: High Society; The Real Housewives of New York City
- Spouse: George Riley Mercer II (divorced)
- Children: Tinsley Mortimer; Dabney Mercer
- Parent(s): William Louis Tatum; Otine Baird Tatum

Dale Tatum Mercer is an American socialite, interior designer, and television personality. She is known for her appearances, alongside her daughter Tinsley Mortimer, on the American reality television series High Society and The Real Housewives of New York City.

== Biography ==
Mercer, born Dale Tatum, is the daughter of William Louis Tatum and Otine Baird Tatum. She is descended from various First Families of Virginia. Mercer grew up in Richmond. Mercer received a Bachelor of Arts degree from Meredith College and a Masters of Liberal Arts from Harvard University.

She married George Riley Mercer II, a businessman from Richmond. Her husband was a real estate developer, architectural consultant, and partner in the Mercer Rug and Carpet Company, the GII Corporation, and the George-Marshall Corporation. They have two daughters, Tinsley Randolph Mercer Mortimer and Dabney Winston Mercer. The family lived at Graymont, an early-20th-century mansion in central Richmond. She and Mercer later divorced after being married for 28 years. Her ex-husband died in 2015.

Mercer lives in Palm Beach, Florida and works as an interior designer there and in Manhattan.

Mercer was listed in the Social Register in 2006. She is a member of the Jamestowne Society and the Colonial Dames of America.

Mercer was a cast member of the 2010 reality television series High Society on The CW. In July 2010 Mercer appeared, alongside her daughter Tinsley, on the Dr. Phil episode Meddling Moms. Since 2017 Mercer has made appearances on Bravo's reality television series The Real Housewives of New York City.
