= Devorah Rose =

American journalist

- Born: Deborah Denise Trachtenberg; Plano, Texas
- Education: Barnard College
- Occupation(s): Editor-in-Chief, socialite, television personality, entrepreneur
- Television: Cake Boss; Married to Jonas; High Society; The Real Housewives of New York City; The Fashionista Diaries; Styled by June; MADE; Dina's Party; NYC Prep
- Website: www.devorahrose.com

Devorah Rose, born Deborah Denise Trachtenberg, is the Editor-in-Chief of Social Life Magazine, a television personality and entrepreneur. In 2011, The New York Observer named Rose one of the top 50 Media Power Bachelorettes. Rose has been described by The New Post as a “real life Blair Waldorf” and by The New York Times as “One part Lily Bart, one part Holly Golightly.”

== Early life and education ==
Rose was born Deborah Denise Trachtenberg in Plano, Texas, to a Venezuelan mother and Guatemalan father. She moved to Venezuela when she was three months old and moved back to the States when she was six or seven. Rose was raised primarily in Newton, Massachusetts. Rose graduated from Barnard College with a bachelor's degree in English and later worked towards her MFA in Columbia University's creative writing program.

== Career ==
=== Social Life Magazine ===
Rose is the Editor-in-Chief of Social Life Magazine. Rose has represented the magazine on TV shows. In June 2011, she was profiled for her work in launching the magazine. Social Life Magazine is referred to as "a bible of sorts" of social life in the Hamptons

=== TV appearances ===
Rose appeared on TLC's American reality television series, Cake Boss, in which she had a $30 million cake studded with diamonds, emeralds, rubies and sapphires made for her. The record-breaking cake was created by baker Buddy Valastro and his staff.

Rose starred alongside Tinsley Mortimer in The CW's High Society, and her feud with Mortimer became a New York Post cover story. On Dina's Party, Dina Manzo dedicated an episode to decorating Rose's Hamptons home. Rose has also appeared on The Real Housewives of New York City, after Bethenny Frankel made the front cover of her magazine.
