= Anna Harriet Heyer =

- Heyer in 1954
- Born: August 30, 1909; Little Rock, Arkansas
- Died: August 12, 2002 (aged 92); Fort Worth, Texas
- Resting place: Greenwood, Ft. Worth
- Education: TCU — 1930 BA; TCU — 1930 BMus; Illinois — 1938 BLib; Columbia — 1939 MSLS; Michigan — 1943 MMus
- Occupations: Music Librarian; UNT; TCU

Anna Harriet Heyer (30 August 1909 Little Rock, Arkansas – 12 August 2002 Fort Worth, Texas) was a distinguished American academic music librarian, musicologist, and bibliographer who for 26 years, from 1940 to 1966, headed the Music Library at University of North Texas.

== Career ==
Otto Kinkeldey, a renowned music librarian and musicologist, had given a lecture in 1937 at the first joint meeting between the American Library Association and the Music Library Association in New York City. In his lecture, Kinkeldey outlined a concept for an appropriate education in music librarianship. Until reading the transcript, Heyer had never contemplated a specialization in music librarianship — she had not even known it existed. The concept intrigued her because, in her words, "It would give me a chance to be within an interest that I like and still do library work."

Heyer traveled to the Columbia University School of Library Service during the summer of 1938 to enroll in a course taught by Richard Angell in "Music Library Administration" — the first any such course had been offered in the country. She stayed on at Columbia for the academic year 1938–1939, earning a Master of Science in Library Science, June 1939.

After spending a year working for the libraries at the University of Texas at Austin, Heyer, in 1940, accepted a position as the first full-time Music Librarian at the University of North Texas, whose College of Music (then referred to as School of Music), had, that same year, upgraded its 1939 induction as Associate member of the National Association of Schools of Music to Institutional member.

Heyer rapidly strengthened the Music Library, which already housed formidable collections, into a major music resource institution. She also forged music librarianship as a field of academic study by teaching the first known academic courses in the discipline. When she arrived, North Texas had acquired sizable collections that included orchestral scores, sheet music, phonograph recordings, and the Carnegie Corporation reproducing unit.

While working for North Texas, she earned a Master of Music degree from the University of Michigan in 1943.

In 1957, Heyer published a groundbreaking bibliography, Historical Sets, Collected Editions, and Monuments of Music: A Guide to their Contents. This reference stood for decades as one of the essential reference tools in the field of Western classical music. For comprehensive research music libraries, it became a guide for holdings.

== Education ==
- 1930: Bachelor of Arts, Mathematics with a minor in piano, Texas Christian University
- 1930: Bachelor of Music, Texas Christian University
- 1933: Bachelor of Science in Library Science, University of Illinois
- Summer 1938: Studied Music Library Administration under Richard Sloane Angell (1905–1985), School of Library Service, Columbia University — Angell was the music librarian at Columbia
- 1939: Master of Science in Library Science, Columbia University
- 1943: Master of Music, University of Michigan

== Selected publications ==
- Policies of Cataloging and Classification in Self-Contained Music Libraries (masters thesis), by Anna Harriet Heyer, Columbia University (1939) OCLC 14448022
- State and Resources of Musicology in the United States (masters thesis), by Anna Harriet Heyer, University of Michigan (August 1943) OCLC 41149927
- A Check-list of Publications of Music, compiled Anna Harriet Heyer, University of Michigan (1944) OCLC 855071
- A Bibliography of Contemporary Music in the Music Library, University of North Texas (March 1955) OCLC 3921901
- Historical Sets, Collected Editions, and Monuments of Music: A Guide to Their Contents, by Anna Harriet Heyer, American Library Association

First Edition (1957) OCLC 560206907
Third Edition (1980) OCLC 6815602, 311496010, 644277165

- Bibliography of Music Bibliographies, by Anna Harriet Heyer, self-published (1967) OCLC 2646864
- University of North Texas Music Library: Its History: 1940–1965, by Anna Harriet Heyer, University of North Texas (1991) OCLC 316125039
