= Dalton L. McMichael =

American textile executive and philanthropist

- Born: Dalton Larkin McMichael; March 10, 1914; Wentworth, North Carolina, US
- Died: July 27, 2001 (aged 87); Winston-Salem, North Carolina, US
- Resting place: Woodland Cemetery
- Education: University of North Carolina at Chapel Hill
- Occupations: textile business executive philanthropist
- Spouses: Dorothy Louise Ragsdale; Hanne Andersen
- Children: 4

Dalton Larkin McMichael Sr. (March 10, 1914 – July 27, 2001) was an American textile executive and philanthropist. He was ranked among the top fifty most influential textile executives in the twentieth century by Textile World Magazine. He was inducted into the Class of 2003 American Textile Hall of Fame by the American Textile History Museum.

== Early life ==
Dalton Larkin McMichael was born in Wentworth, North Carolina. He was named after his maternal grandparents, Susan Victoria Dalton and Lieutenant Larkin DeShazo, a confederate officer who served in May's Company of the 45th Infantry Regiment. He attended the University of North Carolina at Chapel Hill for pre-medicine, later switching to accounting, graduating in 1938.

== Career ==
McMichael's first textile job was for the Cost Accounting Department at Burlington Industries in Greensboro, North Carolina. He later moved to sales in the hosiery division of the company. He then moved to New York for three years where he met William Johnston Armfield III, the general manager of the hosiery division at Burlington Industries. In 1946, they joined C.T. Sutherland in forming the Madison Throwing Company, a nylon producer based in Madison. In 1970, the company was acquired by Burlington Industries and renamed Burlington Madison Yarns. McMichael shortly thereafter resigned as president of the subsidiary and joined colleague and son of the late Armfield III, Billy Armfield, in launching Macfield Texturing. The company's name was shortened to Macfield in 1987. It merged with Unifi in 1991.

In 1982, McMichael, along with other textile industry leaders, formed Vintage Yarns, which was sold to Unifi in 1993. In 1992, McMichael created Mayo Yarns and Dan Valley Yarns. These two companies later merged, and then merged with Frontier Spinning in 2000, when McMichael retired.

In 1998, McMichael received Textile World's Lifetime Achievement Award for his work in the textured yarn business.

McMichael served as chairman of the Madison-Mayodan School Board for 15 years. Dalton L. McMichael High School in Mayodan, North Carolina was named in his honor.

== Philanthropy ==
McMichael was a benefactor of the University of North Carolina at Chapel Hill, the UNC School of Dentistry, Elon University, Salem College, Davidson College, Morehead Memorial Hospital and it's John Smith Jr./Dalton McMichael Cancer Center.

== Personal life ==
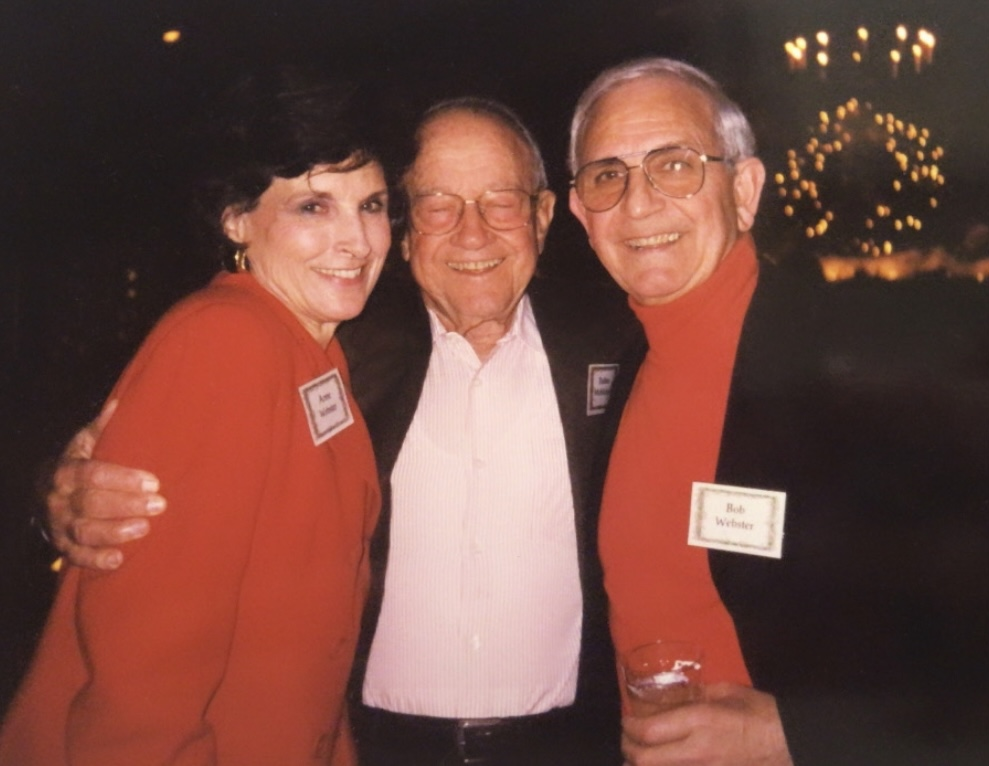
McMichael (center) with Anne Fisher Carter Webster and Robert Penn Webster

McMichael married Dorothy Louise Ragsdale and had four children; Gail McMichael Drew, Flavel McMichael Godfrey, Dalton Larkin McMichael Jr., and Louise McMichael Miracle. When his first wife died, McMichael was remarried to Hanne Andersen. McMichael died on July 27, 2001, at Wake Forest University Baptist Medical Center in Winston-Salem at the age of eighty-seven. His funeral was held on July 30, 2001, at Madison Presbyterian Church, where he was a parishioner. He is buried in Woodland Cemetery in Madison, North Carolina.
