= Darius Gray (American football) =

American football player

No. 77 – South Carolina Gamecocks
- Position: Offensive lineman
- Class: Freshman

Personal information
- Listed height: 6 ft 3 in (1.91 m)
- Listed weight: 302 lb (137 kg)

Career information
- High school: St. Christopher's School (Richmond, Virginia)
- College: South Carolina (2026–present)
- Stats at ESPN

Darius Gray is an American college football offensive lineman for the South Carolina Gamecocks.

== Early life ==
Gray attended St. Christopher's School in Richmond, Virginia. He played both the offensive and defensive line in high school. As a senior in 2025, he was the VISAA Defensive Player of the Year. Gray was selected to play in the 2025 Navy All-American Bowl. A five-star recruit, he committed to the University of South Carolina to play college football. Gray also played basketball in high school and was the Virginia Prep League co-Player of the Year his junior year in 2024.

== College career ==
Gray entered his freshman year at South Carolina in 2026 as a starter.
