= Harry Easterly =

Harry Watkey Easterly Jr. (August 31, 1922 – June 16, 2005) served as president of the United States Golf Association, one of the World's two ruling bodies of Golf (the other being The R&A), in 1976 and 1977 and later as its first executive director. Though as a competitor he distinguished himself locally, winning both the Richmond City Championship and the Country Club of Virginia Championship many times and making many nearly successful campaigns for the Virginia State Championship, it was in the administration of golf organizations, running golf competitions, and writing and applying the rules of golf that he made his mark on the sport. He was noted for a near obsession with the rules of golf and was instrumental in consolidating those rules into a single globally recognized document.

He was a graduate of St. Christopher's School in Richmond, Virginia, and Virginia Military Institute in Lexington, Virginia, where he was the president of the Class of 1944. He served with the Marine Corps during World War II and was involved in their actions on Okinawa and Iwo Jima.
