= St. Christopher's School (Richmond, Virginia) =

Private K-12 School in Virginia, US

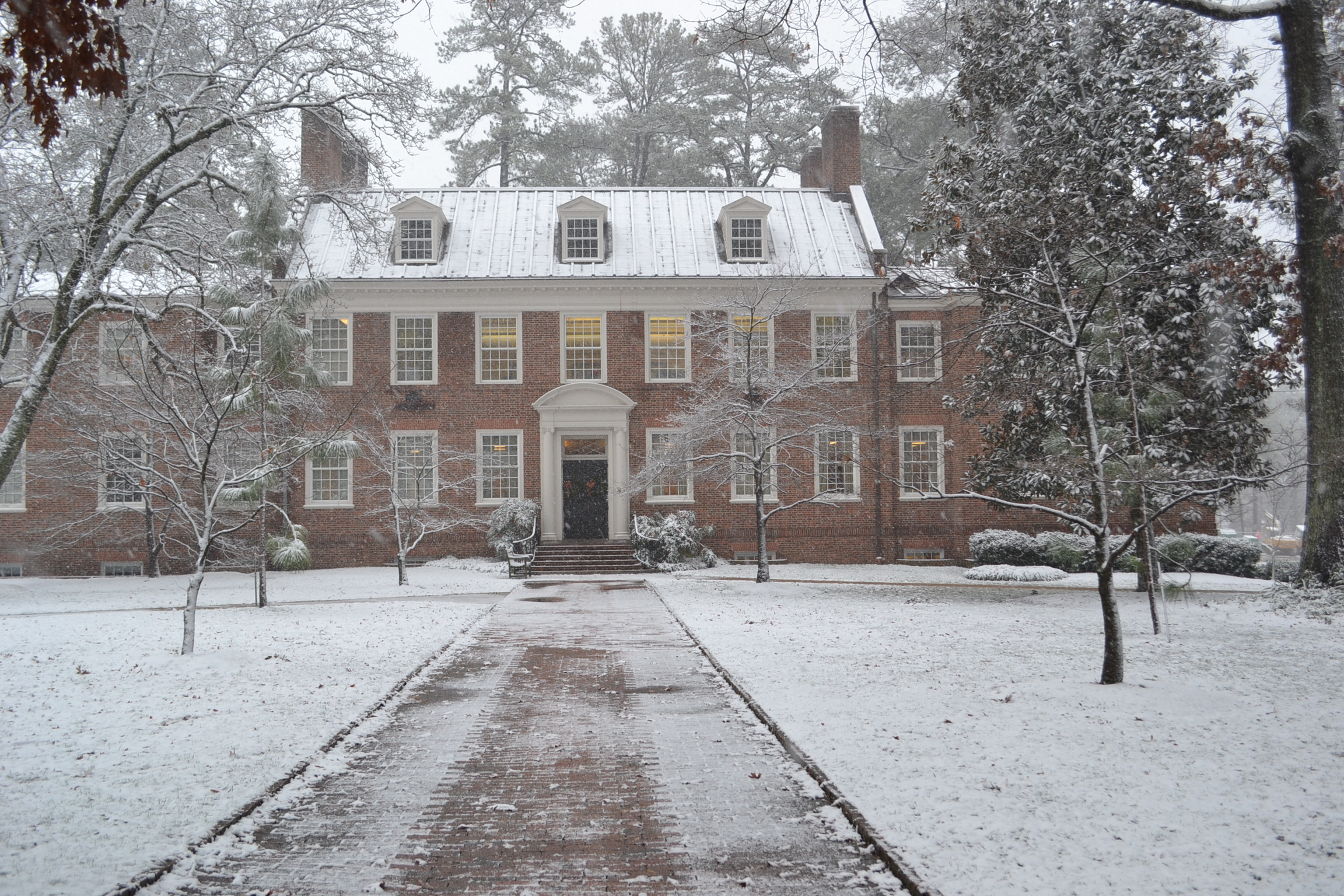
- St. Christopher's School in winter
- Richmond, Virginia; United States

Information
- Type: Private School
- Motto: "Initium Sapientiae Timor Domini"
- Religious affiliation: Episcopal
- Established: 1911
- Headmaster: Mason Lecky
- Grades: Jr. K - 12
- Enrollment: 938
- Student to teacher ratio: 9:1
- Campus size: 8.6 acres
- Campus type: Suburban
- Colors: Red and Gray
- Mascot: Saints
- Newspaper: The Pine Needle
- Yearbook: Raps and Taps
- Feeder schools
- St. Christopher's School
- U.S. National Register of Historic Places
- Virginia Landmarks Register
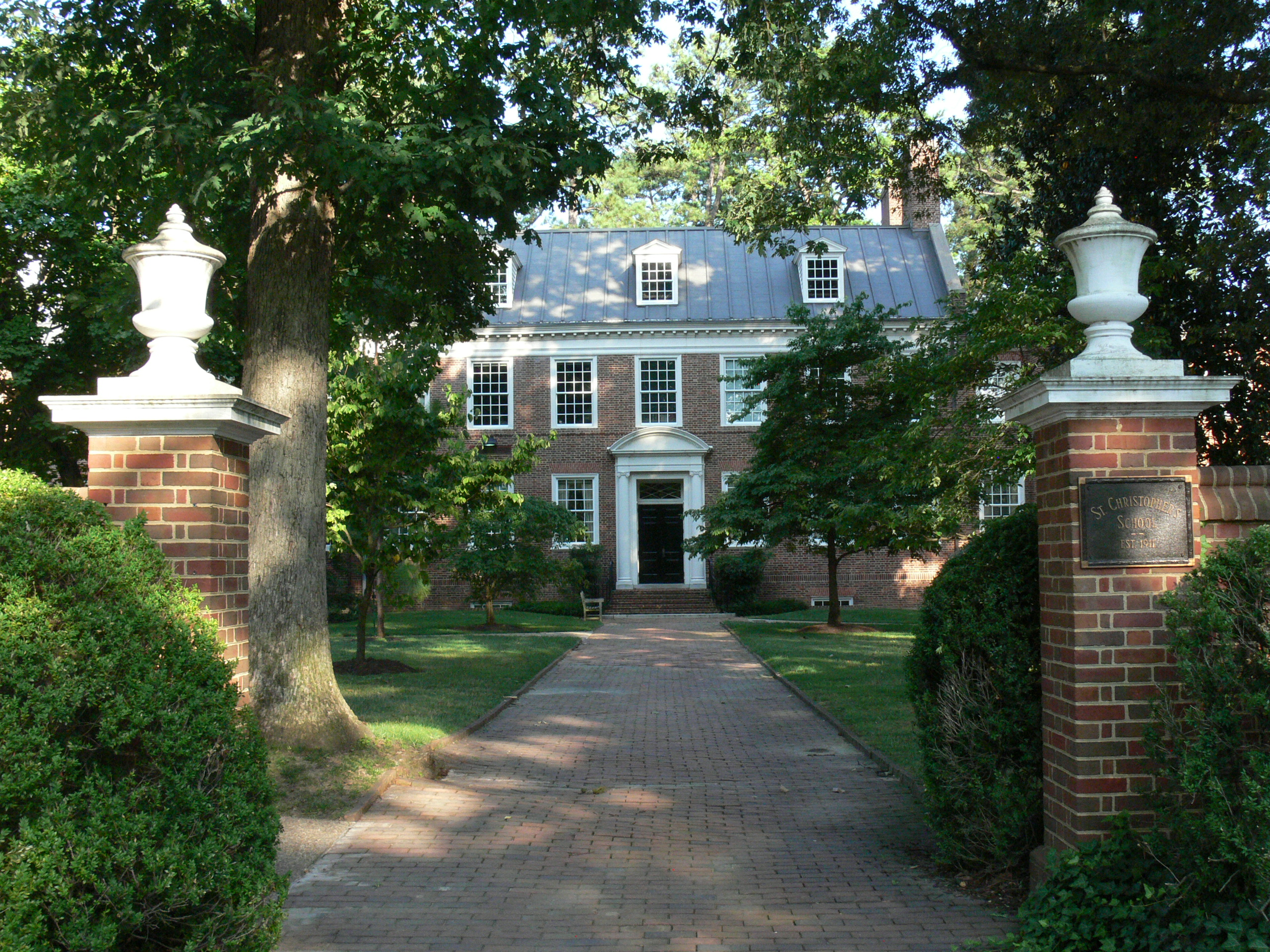

- Location within Virginia Location within the United States
- Location: 711 St. Christopher's Rd., Richmond, Virginia
- Coordinates: 37°34′49″N 77°31′16″W
- Area: 8.6 acres (3.5 ha)
- Built: 1911
- Architects: Baskerville & Sons
- Architectural style: Colonial Revival, Classical Revival
- NRHP reference No.: 02000183
- VLR No.: 127-5995

Significant dates
- Added to NRHP: March 13, 2002
- Designated VLR: December 5, 2001
- Website: http://www.stchristophers.com

St. Christopher's School is an American private college preparatory school for boys located in Richmond, Virginia. The school is listed on the National Register of Historic Places.

== History ==
Dr. Churchill Gibson Chamberlayne founded St. Christopher's School in 1911 as The Chamberlayne School. On June 11, 1920, a system of church schools was established by the Episcopal Diocese of Virginia, at which time The Chamberlayne School was renamed St. Christopher's School, after Saint Christopher.

The campus includes frame buildings from the era of its founding as well as brick buildings added in the second–quarter of the 20th–century. The campus became a Virginia Landmark on December 5, 2001, and was listed on the National Register of Historic Places on March 13, 2002.

== Students ==
As of 2022, the student population is 938. The students are all male and are 63% White, 11% Asian, 9% African American, 8% Hispanic, 6% Multiracial, and 0% Native American and Pacific Island.

The student-to-teacher ratio is 9 to 1.

== Academics ==
St. Christopher's includes junior kindergarten through 12th grade. It offers more than 25 Advanced Placement courses. A program of coordination with nearby St. Catherine's School allows a broader selection of courses at the Upper School level, taught in coeducational classes on both campuses. After graduating, 100% of its students attend a four–year college.

Niche ranks the school as the number two all-boys high school and the number 8 K through grade twelve school in Virginia.

== Student life ==
=== Athletics ===
St. Christopher's School belongs to two athletic associations, the Virginia Prep League and the Virginia Independent Schools Athletic Association (VISAA). St. Christopher's has longstanding athletic rivalries with Benedictine College Preparatory, Collegiate School, and Woodberry Forest School.

The wrestling program, considered one of the best in Virginia, holds a streak of 21 straight Virginia Prep League titles and 3 consecutive VISAA State championships, as well as 16 of the last 22.

=== Student publications ===
- The Pine Needle Online (web-based newspaper)
- Raps and Taps (yearbook)
- Hieroglyphic (arts journal)

== Accreditations and memberships ==
St. Christopher's School is accredited or a member of the following organizations:

- National Association of Independent Schools (NAIS)
- Virginia Association of Independent Schools (VAIS)
- International Boys' Schools Coalition (IBSC)

== Notable alumni ==
- Edmund Archer (1904–1986), artist
- Penn Badgley (born 1986), actor in television series Gossip Girl
- Mason Bates (born 1977), composer
- Brent Bookwalter (born 1984), professional cyclist, Tour de France contender in 2010
- Harry Easterly (1922–2005), President of the United States Golf Association
- Darius Gray, college football offensive lineman for the South Carolina Gamecocks
- Henry G. Hager (1934–2024), a politician
- Will Hardy (born 1988), professional basketball coach and current head coach of the Utah Jazz
- Trent Hendrick, college football linebacker for the UCLA Bruins
- Dean H. King (born 1962), novelist
- G. Manoli Loupassi (born 1967), politician, a former member of the Virginia House of Delegates
- Don Mancini (born 1963), filmmaker, producer, and director
- Donald McEachin (1961–2022), politician, member of the United States House of Representatives
- Griff O'Ferrall (born 2003), baseball player
- Chris Peace (born 1976), former member of the Virginia House of Delegates
- Robert Pratt (born 1951), professional football player
- Ted Price, CEO of Insomniac Games
- Harrison Ruffin Tyler (1928–2025), American chemical engineer, businessperson, and preservationist
- Stephan Said (born 1968), musician and activist
- Tom Slater (born 1968), baseball coach
- Charlie Swanson (born 1998), Olympic swimmer
- James Harvie Wilkinson III (born 1944), a federal judge serving on the United States Court of Appeals for the Fourth Circuit
- Monk Willis (1916–2011), LBJ political adviser, regent for the University of North Texas
- Martin Williams (1924–1992), jazz critic
- Tom Wolfe (1931–2018), novelist
