= Tinsley Mortimer =

American socialite and television personality

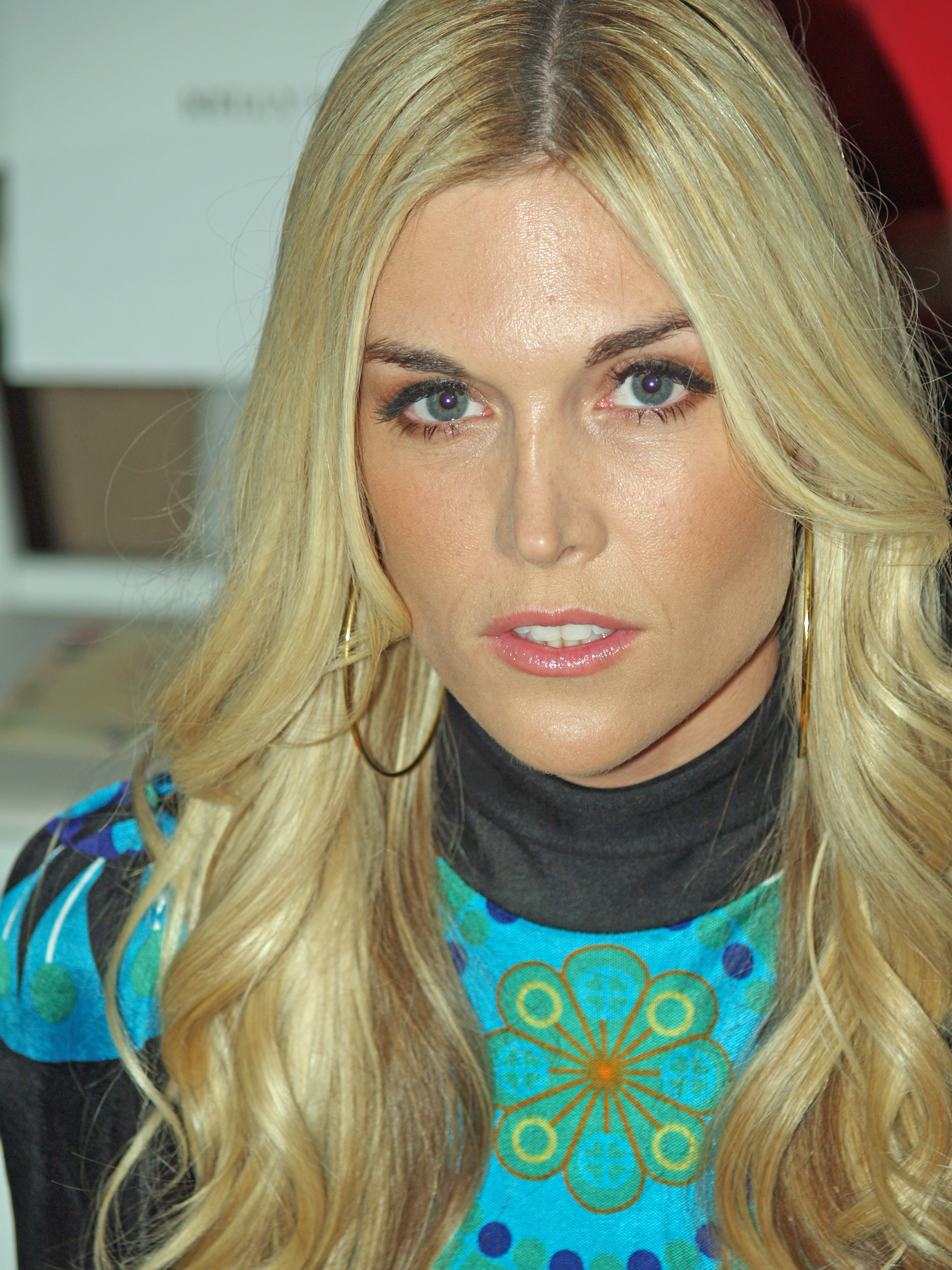
- Mortimer in 2007
- Born: Tinsley Randolph Mercer; August 11, 1976 (age 50); Richmond, Virginia, U.S.
- Education: Columbia University (BA); Cooper Hewitt, Smithsonian Design Museum (MA)
- Occupations: Socialite; television personality; fashion designer; writer; actress
- Known for: High Society; The Real Housewives of New York City
- Spouses: Robert Livingston Mortimer (m. 2002; div. 2010) Robert Bovard (m. 2023)
- Parents: George Riley Mercer Jr.; Dale Tatum

Tinsley Randolph Mortimer (née Mercer; born August 11, 1976) is an American socialite, television personality, and fashion designer. She is known for starring in the reality television series High Society and The Real Housewives of New York City.

== Early life ==
Mortimer was born Tinsley Randolph Mercer in Richmond, Virginia. Her father was George Riley Mercer Jr., a real estate investor, and her mother is Dale Tatum Mercer, an interior designer and socialite. She has a younger sister, Dabney Winston Mercer. Her paternal grandfather, George Riley Mercer Sr., founded Mercer Rug Cleansing in 1936. Mortimer is descended from multiple First Families of Virginia. She grew up at Graymont, her family's estate in Richmond.

Mortimer attended St. Catherine's School, a private all-girls Episcopal school in Richmond, and later the Lawrenceville School, a boarding school in Lawrenceville, New Jersey, where she was a member of the Kirby House. Mortimer was a debutante and was presented to Richmond society during the Bal du Bois at the Country Club of Virginia.

She went to the University of North Carolina at Chapel Hill as a freshman in college, but later transferred to Columbia University. At Columbia, she was a member of St. Anthony Hall. She was also a nationally ranked tennis player and played varsity tennis for Columbia. She graduated from Columbia with a bachelor of arts degree in art history, and later obtained her master's degree in decorative arts from the Cooper Hewitt design museum.

== Career ==
Early in her career, Mortimer worked as a beauty assistant at Vogue and an event planner for Harrison & Shriftman. Mortimer had a line of handbags and clothing in Japan for Samantha Thavasa, for which she was featured in an advertising campaign. Her handbag line, "Samantha Thavasa by Tinsley Mortimer", debuted in winter 2006 with its American flagship store in New York City. She was also featured prominently in Samantha Thavasa USA's online promotional materials and in the company's Madison Avenue store, which also carried her handbags. She subsequently formed her own clothing line, Riccime by Tinsley Mortimer, which was sold exclusively in Japan. In 2008, Mortimer became involved in branding and design for a condominium development.

Mortimer served as Christian Dior's beauty ambassador and helped to create a lip gloss named Tinsley Pink. She has appeared in several magazine editorials, including Vogue, WWD, Harper's Bazaar, and Marie Claire. In May 2012, she appeared on the cover of Vestal magazine, which also featured an editorial styled by Lo'renzo Hill-White and shot by fashion photographer Kevin Sinclair. She has appeared on the magazine covers of Page Six Magazine, Virginia Living, Avenue, CVLUX, Maniac, and New York.

She made a cameo on the season 2 premiere episode of Gossip Girl, which aired on September 1, 2008, on The CW. In an interview for Vanity Fair, Gossip Girl's costume designers Eric Daman and Meredith Markworth-Pollack cited Mortimer and fellow New York socialite Arden Wohl when asked if they were influenced by New York socialites. Daman and Markworth-Pollack said that "if you put Blair and Serena together, you get Tinsley Mortimer. Tinsley's hair is always set and she always looks perfect, but she takes risks." On March 10, 2010, Mortimer debuted her own reality television show called High Society, starring Mortimer along with other socialites such as Paul Johnson Calderon and Devorah Rose. The show documented the lives of Mortimer and her friends in New York City, but it was critically panned and cancelled after eight episodes because of low ratings. The failure of the show was credited with causing Mortimer's subsequent "downfall" as a New York socialite.

Mortimer wrote a novel titled Southern Charm, which follows Minty Davenport from South Carolina to New York, where she is the victim of rumors. It was published by Simon & Schuster in April 2013. Mortimer also wrote a chapter in the book The Park Avenue Diet, which outlines recommendations on improving one's conversation and social skills, written by Manhattan diet doctor Stuart Fischer. She has been a contributor for Town & Country magazine since 2017. In 2017, Mortimer joined the cast of Bravo's reality television series The Real Housewives of New York City for the show's ninth season.

In 2014, she launched a home goods collection manufactured by Pop Culture Living, an e-commerce site featuring curated collections of home accessories. Her line of home goods products was sold at Bed Bath & Beyond and Wayfair. The collection included dinnerware, decorative glasses, barware, and ice buckets. In June 2019, Mortimer launched a new collaboration of false eyelashes with the beauty brand Winky Lux titled "XXO Tinsley for Winky Lux." She also designed the product packaging. In September 2019, Mortimer walked the runway for Garo Sparo's fashion show at New York Fashion Week. In October 2019, Mortimer announced that she had partnered up with RuMe to launch a Resort 2020 collection, which consisted of travel, fashion, and beauty accessories.

List of fashion and beauty collections by Tinsley Mortimer
Year	Title	Brand	Notes
2006–2012	Samantha Thavasa by Tinsley Mortimer	Samantha Thavasa	Handbag collection
2007–2010	Riccime by Tinsley Mortimer	Riccime	Clothing line
2014	Tinsley Mortimer Collection	Pop Culture Living	Home goods line
2019	XXO Tinsley for Winky Lux	Winky Lux	Eyelashes line
2019	Tinsley by RuMe	RuMe	Bag and accessories line
2021	Tinsley x Jennifer Zeuner	Jennifer Zeuner Jewelry	Jewelry collection

== Advocacy ==
In July 2020, Mortimer appeared in the pro-adoption billboard "Buy Shoes, Not Dogs" for PETA. The billboard was located in Chicago, Illinois, and Mortimer also appeared in a video, where she encouraged people to adopt dogs from shelters. Mortimer adopted her two dogs named Strawberry and Shortcake following the death of her dog Bambi.

== Personal life ==
Mortimer met Robert Livingston "Topper" Mortimer (son of John Jay Mortimer) at Lawrenceville School and eloped when they were both 18. However, their parents forced them to annul the marriage. On May 4, 2002, they remarried in Richmond, Virginia. The Mortimers divorced in 2010.

On July 23, 2010, Mortimer was featured with her mother Dale on the Dr. Phil show discussing her divorce and her differences with her mother. Mortimer's father died on March 26, 2015, in Providence, Rhode Island.

In April 2016, Mortimer was arrested for trespassing on her former boyfriend Alexander "Nico" Fanjul's property in Palm Beach, Florida. The charges were later dismissed.

On February 11, 2017, Mortimer was introduced to Chicago-based Coupon Cabin CEO Scott Kluth by her Real Housewives of New York City castmate Carole Radziwill. The pair then entered an on-again, off-again long distance relationship between New York and Chicago, and by October 2018, the couple had separated. Mortimer and Kluth were then engaged in November 2019 but ended their engagement in March 2021.

In November 2023, Mortimer married businessman Robert Bovard and became a stepmother to his three children.

== Filmography ==
Year	Title	Role	Notes
2007	The Manny	Herself	Uncredited
2008	Gossip Girl	Herself	Episodes: "The Serena Also Rises", "Summer, Kind of Wonderful"
2009–2011	The Fashion Show	Herself / Judge	16 episodes
2010	Dr. Phil	Herself	Episode: "Meddling Moms"
2010	America's Next Top Model	Herself	Episode: "New York Women"
2010	High Society	Herself	Main role, creator, and executive producer; 8 episodes
2017–2020	The Real Housewives of New York City	Herself	Main cast member (seasons 9–12); 75 episodes
2019	The Other Two	Herself	Episode: "Chase Goes to a Premiere"
2023	Queenmaker: The Making of an It Girl	Herself	Hulu original documentary

== Bibliography ==
- Fischer, Stuart (2008). The Park Avenue Diet: The Complete 7-Point Plan for a Lifetime of Beauty and Health. Chapter by Tinsley Mortimer. Hatherleigh Press.
- Mortimer, Tinsley (2013). Southern Charm: A Novel. Simon & Schuster.
