= John Segar Gravatt =

American lawyer

Personal details
- Born: February 26, 1909 Blackstone, Virginia, United States
- Died: December 9, 1983 (aged 74)
- Party: Democratic
- Spouse: Isbell Turnbull
- Education: University of Virginia (B.A.); University of Virginia School of Law (LL.B.)

John Segar Gravatt (February 26, 1909 – December 9, 1983) was a Virginia lawyer and trial judge. He is often known as J. Segar Gravatt, although this is also the appellation of his youngest daughter, Jacqueline Segar Gravatt, who was the first woman ordained as an Episcopal minister in Virginia.

He drew national attention for defending the Massive Resistance policy of the Prince Edward County, Virginia School Board to the United States Supreme Court decisions in Brown v. Board of Education and Davis v. County School Board of Prince Edward County, its companion case. Also in Griffin v. School Board of Prince Edward County.

== Early life and education ==
Gravatt was born at "Birdwood" in Blackstone, Nottoway County, Virginia. He was the eldest son of William Moncure Gravatt (1883-1961) and Rebecca Dupuy Epes Gravatt ("Birdie") (1882-1959). He had an elder sister, a brother, and three younger sisters.

He attended the local public school, then Episcopal High School. After graduation, Gravatt attended the University of Virginia and the University of Virginia Law School, receiving an LLB degree in 1933. He was a member of The Eli and Imp Societies, Delta Kappa Epsilon, and the University's Board of Visitors from 1948-1958. During high school and college, he also earned letters in four sports.

During the Great Depression, Gravatt lived with his parents and at least two of his siblings. When he gained a financial footing, he married Isbell Turnbull (1918-1997), daughter of Judge Needham Stuart Turnbull. They had three daughters, Mary Rebecca and the twins, Isbell Stuart Turnbull and Jacqueline Segar Epes, all of whom outlived their parents.

== Career ==
After his admission to the Virginia bar, Gravatt established a private legal practice with his father. He briefed and argued dozens of cases before the Virginia Supreme Court and in federal courts. He continued his legal practice until his death in 1983, and he was also heavily involved in Rotary club. For 35 years Gravatt was also a part-time trial judge in Nottoway County, after his election to the position by the Virginia General Assembly. He also served in Nottoway Juvenile and Domestic Relations Court.

Gravatt represented Dinwiddie and Nottoway Counties and the City of Petersburg in the limited 1956 Virginia Constitutional Convention, held between March 5 and March 7, 1956. He handily defeated Wyatt T. Walker, whom Gravatt referred to as a "negro of the City of Petersburg", and who later became Executive Secretary of the Southern Christian Leadership Conference. The convention was necessary to amend the state Constitution to allow tuition grants to private schools, called segregation academies because they primarily served white parents who wanted their children educated in an environment isolated from non-white students, including African Americans. On July 23, 1956, Gravatt gave a speech advocating continued segregation before the Defenders of State Sovereignty and Individual Liberties, with which he was heavily involved.

Gravatt assisted David J. Mays in the litigation which gave rise to the U.S. Supreme Court decisions in Harrison v. NAACP (1959) and NAACP v. Button (1963). He was also a member of the Commission for Constitutional Government, which Mays and James J. Kilpatrick led, and which couched segregation policies in constitutional terms to appeal to Northerners.

From at least early 1955, Gravatt represented the Prince Edward County Commonwealth's Attorney or Board of Supervisors in several cases. He was among those advising the county board that it could choose not to appropriate any funds for public education, and thereby close its schools to avoid desegregation. Prince Edward County thus closed its schools in 1959 to avoid mandated racial integration. In March 1964, after nearly five years of the school closure, and after fellow lawyer Collins Denny, Jr., head of the Defenders of State Sovereignty had died, Gravatt argued Griffin v. County School Board of Prince Edward County before the United States Supreme Court. When he attempted to highlight the new integrated county school built using federal grants (after severe disturbances in August 1963), as well as argue that schools were solely a matter of state jurisdiction, Justice Hugo Black chided Gravatt for evasiveness and Chief Justice Earl Warren tartly questioned him as to whether that meant black children had a "freedom to go through life without an education." Justice Black wrote the Court's decision, which was issued on May 25, questioning the county's long deliberation and lack of speed in implementing Brown, as well as denouncing the closure policy for subverting the court's decision for the unconstitutional reasons of race and opposition to desegregation.

Gravatt also assisted on the briefs in Board of Supervisors of Prince Edward County cert. denied 385 U.S. 960 (1966) and School Board of City of Richmond, Virginia v State Board of Education of Virginia, which was affirmed by an equally divided Supreme Court on May 21, 1973

== Death and legacy ==
Gravatt died in 1983 and was survived by his wife and daughters. He is buried in Lakeview Cemetery in Nottoway County.

After his death, it was revealed that he was a member of the Secret Seven Society, devoted to performing anonymous good deeds. His papers beginning in 1941 are held by the Special Collections division of the University of Virginia Library.
