= A. M. Willis Jr. =

American business executive and political adviser

Achille Murat Willis Jr. (a.k.a. "Monk"; Murat rhymes with "hurrah;" 9 October 1916 Richmond, Virginia — 14 January 2011 Longview, Texas) was an American insurance executive, civic leader, political adviser, Congressional staffer, and public university regent. From age 30 on, he lived in Longview, Texas. From 1965 to 1983, Willis was one of nine regents for the University of North Texas. Three consecutive six-year appointments by three Texas governors added-up to eighteen years of public service. During that time, the UNT Board of Regents elected Willis chairman for ten consecutive annual terms, from 1969 to 1979.

Willis was the son of A. Murat Willis Sr., a nationally known surgeon, prolific professor of surgery at the Medical College of Virginia and founder of several hospitals.

== Career ==
=== Campaign staff, presidential race ===
Although Willis was a lifelong Democrat, his conviction ran along philosophical lines that, at least once in his life, overrode party lines. Willis had worked for the 1940 Republican presidential candidate Wendell Willkie when he ran against Franklin D. Roosevelt; and in doing so, wrote some of his speeches.

=== Adviser to Lyndon Johnson ===
When Willis moved to Texas in 1948, newly married, he worked for Lyndon B. Johnson's senate campaign. Having served as a delegate to the Democratic National Convention in 1956, 1960, and 1968, he became a friend and adviser to President Johnson.

=== U.S. Congressional staffer ===
In 1972, three years before the end of the Vietnam War, Willis joined the staff of U.S. Congressman Ray Roberts. In 1976, a year after the U.S. pulled out of Vietnam, Roberts appointed Willis as chief of staff of the House Veterans Affairs Committee, of which Roberts was chairman. Willis held that position until 1983. Willis' oldest daughter, Catherine, had been a member of Roberts' staff in 1971.

=== University of North Texas regent ===
In 1965, Governor John Connally appointed Willis to the nine-member Board of Regents of the University of North Texas. He was reappointed in 1972 by Governor Preston Smith and again in 1979 by Governor Dolph Briscoe. In 1969, the Board elected him to a one-year term as chairman, making him the second chairman in the board's twenty-year history. As chairman, he replaced Dallas banking executive Benjamin Harrison Wooten (1894–1971), who had held the position since the board was created in May 1949. The board reelected Willis annually as chairman for nine more years, until 1979. Willis remained on the board until 1983.

Willis was regarded as a highly active regent, which drew praise and criticism. He also presided during an era of student activism in civil rights, anti-Vietnam War protests, free speech, and academic policies.

==== University of North Texas Health Science Center ====
In 1979, while chairman, Willis led a successful defense on behalf of the board against a bill introduced in the Texas Legislature by Gib Lewis to transfer UNT's Texas College of Osteopathic Medicine (TCOM, now known as the University of North Texas Health Science Center) to the University of Texas System. At the time, critics — who were impatient over the progress during the start-up of TCOM — harbored a view that North Texas had little experience running a medical school and that managing by a university system steeped with experience, such as the University of Texas System, would benefit TCOM. Willis attributed concerns about management to start-up and growing pains and argued that folding TCOM into the UT System would pit the state's new venture into osteopathic medicine against the state's highly established, powerful medical education and research establishment. TCOM soon emerged as a stand-alone public institution, the University of North Texas Health Science Center, providing health care, medical and bio-medical research, and professional medical physician education.

==== A.M. Willis, Jr., Library ====
On August 24, 1978, the other regents resolved to name the new library the "A.M. Willis, Jr., Library" for his "loyal and devoted service." Willis invested great personal effort into the planning and construction of the library. Aside from being a rapid reader with a large personal library, Willis felt that erecting a large, centrally located, beautiful facility for current and future collections was a high priority. He viewed it as a fundamental building-block, particularly at post-baccalaureate and research levels. North Texas, at the time, was already well known for some of its collections, particularly music.

The building — originally designed as three buildings to be erected in three phases — was designed by Caudill Rowlett Scott and opened the summer of 1971. It was formally dedicated April 25, 1972. The building is the third of four university buildings named after a regent. The first, a classroom building, was Wooten Hall. The second, a dormitory, was Kerr Hall. The fourth was the Murchison Performing Arts Center.

In the words of then North Texas President C.C. Nolen, "He [Willis] is the complete board chairman." The naming was not without controversy. The Faculty Senate, by resolution on October 11, 1978, opposed the name on grounds that it violated an erstwhile board policy of not naming anything on campus after living people, regents in particular. President Nolen, a non-academic who had been a fund raiser for Texas Christian University, insisted on relaxing the policy with an eye towards soliciting large capital gifts that would lead to naming facilities after donors.

=== Early career ===
After studying a year at Harvard Business School during the fall and spring of 1938 and 1939, Willis left and accepted a position at Johns-Manville in New York City, where he helped run the company's exhibit at the 1939 New York World's Fair. He then worked on Wendell Willkie's presidential campaign, later explaining that he wasn't a Republican, but was against Franklin D. Roosevelt's court-packing scheme. Willkie lost and Willis joined the U.S. Navy in 1942, serving until 1946 in the Pacific during World War II, rising to the rank of lieutenant commander. In 1946, he moved back to New York City, where he met and in 1948 married Frances Maxine Hundahl (1918–1995) of Tulsa. They moved to Longview, Texas, where, from the late 1940s until 1976, Willis was a district manager for Mutual of Omaha under his father-in-law, David Jasper Hundahl (1895–1968).

== Education ==
Willis earned a Bachelor of Arts degree in English and economics from Washington & Lee University in 1938 and studied at the Harvard Business School during the 1938–1939 school-year. He received his primary and secondary education at St. Christopher's School in Richmond, Virginia, graduating in 1934. Willis was a lover of books and rapid reader who typically read three books a week. He had an extensive personal library and was a reciter of poetry.

== Civic involvement ==
Local
- Co-recipient of the first Unity Awards presented in 2005 by the Unity and Diversity Committee (formerly known as the Race Relations Committee), founded in 1995 by the Partners in Prevention sponsored by the City of Longview
- Chairman of the Board of Trustees of the Nicholson Memorial Library, Longview, Texas
- President of the Longview Mental Health Association
- President of the Longview Civic Music Association (1960)
- Chairman of the Longview Planning & Zoning Commission
- President of the Longview Museum and Arts Center
- Chairman of the Gregg County, Texas Red Cross
- Director of the Gregg County, Texas United Fund
- Vice-President of the Longview YMCA (1953)

State
- Director of the Texas State Commission on Mental Health
- Director of the Texas Commission for Better Schools
- In 1972, Willis was elected chairman of the Committee of Governing Boards of Texas State Colleges and Universities; he replaced Frank Craig Erwin Jr. (1920–1980), regent for the University of Texas System from 1963 to 1975, and chairman from 1966 to 1971. Both Willis and Erwin had received their appointments to become regents by their friend, John Connally, and both were friends with Lyndon B. Johnson.

== Professional & social affiliations ==
- Willis was inducted into The Society of the Cincinnati

== Family ==
Willis was married twice. His first was to Courtnay Marshall Jones (1916–1984) on April 1, 1940. They divorced the 1940s and in 1947 Courtnay remarried Zalpheus Reed Dillingham (1910–1977). Willis' second was to Frances Maxine Hundahl (1918–1995) on June 3, 1948. He and Frances remained married until her death. Together, they had three daughters:

1. Catherine Hucheson Willis
2. Elizabeth Gold Willis (married to Rick Kackley)
3. Mary Murat Willis (married to John Lewis Tabor)

Willis' father, Achille Murat Willis, MD (1878–1929), was a nationally known surgeon and, from 1922 until his death, professor of surgery at Medical College of Virginia in Richmond. He had co-founded the Rocky Mount Hospital in North Carolina, the George Ben Johnston Hospital in Abingdon, Virginia, the Community Hospital in Nassawadox, and the Johnson-Willis Hospital in Richmond. In 1929, when A.M. Willis Jr. was twelve years old, his father committed suicide in his office at the Johnston-Willis Hospital after successfully completing surgery. There was a consensus by colleagues that he had been despondent over strong disagreements on curricular matters with the Medical College and possible clinical depression. The tragic loss bothered Monk Willis for rest of his life.

== See also ==
- University of North Texas System
