= Otto Kinkeldey =

American music academic (1878–1966)

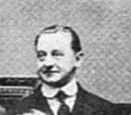
- Born: November 27, 1878; New York City
- Died: September 19, 1966 (aged 87)
- Occupation: Librarian, musicologist
- Employer: Cornell University; Harvard University; New York Public Library; University of Texas at Austin; University of Wrocław

Otto Kinkeldey (November 27, 1878 – September 19, 1966) was an American music librarian and musicologist. He was the first president of the American Musicological Society and held the first chair in musicology at any American university.

== Biography ==
Kinkeldey was born in Manhattan, New York City on November 27, 1878. He received his B.A. in 1898 from City College of New York and his M.A. from New York University in 1900. In a somewhat unusual step for an American at the time, he studied for his doctorate at a German university, the Royal Academic Institute for Church Music in Berlin, where he received his Ph.D. in 1909. In 1910, Kinkeldey was appointed Royal Prussian Professor at the University of Breslau

Returning to New York, he served in the United States Army during World War I. He became head of the New York Public Library's Music Division, serving in that capacity from 1915 to 1923.

In 1923, he moved to Cornell University, becoming a professor of musicology and in 1930 the fourth librarian of the Cornell University Library. He retired in 1946 as Professor Emeritus of Cornell and continued to teach at other universities. From 1946 to 1948, Kinkeldey was Visiting Professor of musicology at Harvard University; from 1948 to 1950 he was Visiting Professor of Musicology at University of Texas at Austin; and for the 1951–1952 school year, he was Distinguished Visiting Professor of musicology at the University of North Texas College of Music While at North Texas, Kinkeldey profoundly influenced Anna Harriet Heyer (1909–2002), the head music librarian at North Texas.

He was elected the first president of the American Musicological Society in 1935, which honored him posthumously in creating the Otto Kinkeldey Award. The award is given each year to recognize the most distinguished book in musicology published during the previous year.

Kinkeldey died in South Orange, New Jersey, September 19, 1966.

== Honors and awards ==
- Townsend Harris Medal, City College of New York
- Honorary Doctor of Letters, Princeton University
