= Emily Tapscott Clark =

American editor and writer (1892–1953)

- Born: September 8, 1892; Richmond, Virginia, U.S.
- Died: July 2, 1953 (aged 60); Philadelphia, Pennsylvania, U.S.
- Resting place: Hollywood Cemetery
- Other names: Emily Tapscott Clark Balch
- Occupations: Writer, editor
- Spouse: Edwin Swift Balch (m. 1924)

Emily Tapscott Clark Balch (September 8, 1892 – July 2, 1953) was an American writer and editor. She is best known for co-founding the literary magazine The Reviewer.

== Biography ==
Born Emily Tapscott Clark on September 8, 1892, in Richmond, Virginia, United States, to Nancy Douglas Tapscott and William Meade Clark, she attended Virginia Randolph Ellett School for Girls (now St. Catherine's School).

She wrote reviews for the Richmond Evening-Journal until the book page was no longer published. In 1920, she co-founded the literary magazine The Reviewer. The other founders were fellow Richmond residents Margaret Waller Freeman, Hunter Taylor Stagg, and Mary Dallas Street. The publication existed from 1921 through 1925.

In 1924, Clark married Edwin Balch and left the magazine. The couple resided in Baltimore. Edwin died in 1927.

Clark's novel Stuffed Peacocks was published in 1927 by Alfred A. Knopf. In 1931, Knopf published her book Innocence Abroad.

Clark died on July 2, 1953, in Philadelphia, Pennsylvania, aged 60. She was buried in Hollywood Cemetery in Richmond.
