= Griffin v. County School Board of Prince Edward County =

Griffin v. School Board
- Supreme Court of the United States

Argued March 30, 1964 Decided May 25, 1964
- Full case name: Griffin v. County School Board of Prince Edward County
- Citations: 377 U.S. 218 (more) 84 S. Ct. 1226; 12 L. Ed. 2d 256; 1964 U.S. LEXIS 1210

Holding
- Closing public schools for the sole purpose of race and providing incentives to attend private segregated schools are violations of the Equal Protection Clause. United States Court of Appeals for the Fourth Circuit reversed.

Court membership
- Chief Justice Earl Warren Associate Justices Hugo Black · William O. Douglas; Tom C. Clark · John M. Harlan II; William J. Brennan Jr. · Potter Stewart; Byron White · Arthur Goldberg

Case opinion
- Majority: Black, joined by Warren, Douglas, Brennan, Stewart, White, Goldberg, Clark (in part), Harlan (in part)

Laws applied
- U.S. Const. Amend. XIV

Griffin v. County School Board of Prince Edward County, 377 U.S. 218 (1964), is a case decided by the Supreme Court of the United States that held that the County School Board of Prince Edward County, Virginia's decision to close all local, public schools and provide vouchers to attend private schools were constitutionally impermissible as violations of the Equal Protection Clause of the Fourteenth Amendment.

== Background ==
In response to the court's holding in Brown v. Board of Education, Virginia initiated a coordinated policy known as massive resistance to maintain segregationist policies. A legislative package known as the Stanley Plan was enacted. Numerous public schools had been closed through the tactics of massive resistance. However, when the Prince Edward County Board of Supervisors was ordered to integrate the public schools under its jurisdiction in June 1959, it took the unusual and extreme step of not appropriating any money for the school system, forcing all public schools in the county to close for the next five years.

Instead of funding public schools, Prince Edward County provided tuition grants for all students, regardless of their race, to use for private nonsectarian education. No private schools existed for blacks, resulting in the total deprivation of formal education to black children in the county from 1959 to 1963. All private schools in the region remained racially segregated. A private foundation proposed opening a private school for black children, but the offer was rejected in part because many of the black residents of Prince Edward County wanted "to continue the legal battle for desegregated public schools." In 1963, "federal, state, and county authorities cooperated to have classes conducted for Negroes and whites in school buildings owned by the county," but the county-funded schools remained closed until the Supreme Court's 1964 ruling on the litigation arising from the county's 1959 closure of the schools.

In 1959, the United States Court of Appeals for the Fourth Circuit had ordered the United States District Court for the Eastern District of Virginia to require that the schools open without segregation. The District Court initially refrained from ordering the schools opened pending the separate question whether the Virginia state constitution required the operation of public schools. In 1962, the District Court ordered the county board to fund the schools. The Fourth Circuit reversed, holding that the District Court should have awaited the state law determinations of whether the county was required to operate schools. The black schoolchildren appealed to the Supreme Court.

The case was argued by Robert L. Carter for the NAACP (Samuel W. Tucker and Frank D. Reeves on the brief); Virginia assistant attorney general R.D. McIlvaine (Attorney General Robert Young Button and Assistant Attorney General Frederick Thomas Gray on the brief) and Judge John Segar Gravatt for the school board, and Solicitor General Archibald Cox argued on behalf of the United States as an amicus curiae, urging reversal.

== Decision ==
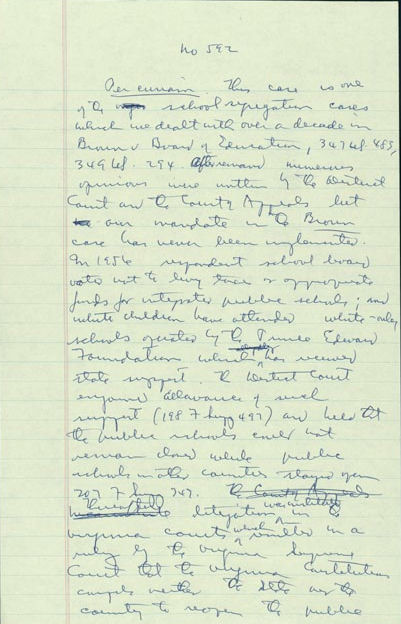
Draft of first page of decision

The Supreme Court, in a decision authored by Justice Hugo Black, ordered the schools reopened. It held that the supervisors' action of refusing to fund the public schools violated the Equal Protection Clause of the 14th Amendment, where the county offered only private school vouchers for students and where no private schools accepted black students.

For the same reasons the District Court may, if necessary to prevent further racial discrimination, require the Supervisors to exercise the power that is theirs to levy taxes to raise funds adequate to reopen, operate, and maintain without racial discrimination a public school system in Prince Edward County like that operated in other counties in Virginia.

— Griffin v. School Bd. of Prince Edward Cty., 377 U.S. 218, 233 (1964)

This case marked the first time that the Supreme Court ordered a county government to exercise their power of taxation.

This unusual level of intervention in the function of local government provoked a dissent by Justices Clark and Harlan:

MR. JUSTICE CLARK and MR. JUSTICE HARLAN disagree with the holding that the federal courts are empowered to order the reopening of the public schools in Prince Edward County . . .

— Griffin v. School Bd. of Prince Edward Cty., 377 U.S. 218, 234 (1964)

== See also ==
- Davis v. County School Board of Prince Edward County
- List of United States Supreme Court cases, volume 377
