= Richmond German Christmas Dance =

Annual ball in Richmond, Virginia

- Genre: debutante ball
- Date: December
- Frequency: annually
- Locations: The Commonwealth Club; Richmond, Virginia; United States
- Inaugurated: 1866
- Patron: Richmond German Society

The Richmond German Christmas Dance is an annual ball held during the Christmas season at The Commonwealth Club in Richmond, Virginia. Founded in 1866, shortly after the end of the American Civil War, it is the oldest debutante ball in Virginia.

== About ==
The Richmond German Christmas Dance was founded in 1866, shortly after the end of the American Civil War by the city's civil leaders. It was named after a popular Prussian dance. The ball served as a way for prominent families of the Antebellum period to maintain their status in the new era.

The dance is one of two premier debutante balls in Richmond, the other being the Bal du Bois. The dance is held annually at The Commonwealth Club, a private gentlemen's club. It is hosted by the Richmond German, a gentlemen's secret dance society. Debutantes are typically relatives of members of the society.
