= Paul Johnson Calderon =

American television personality

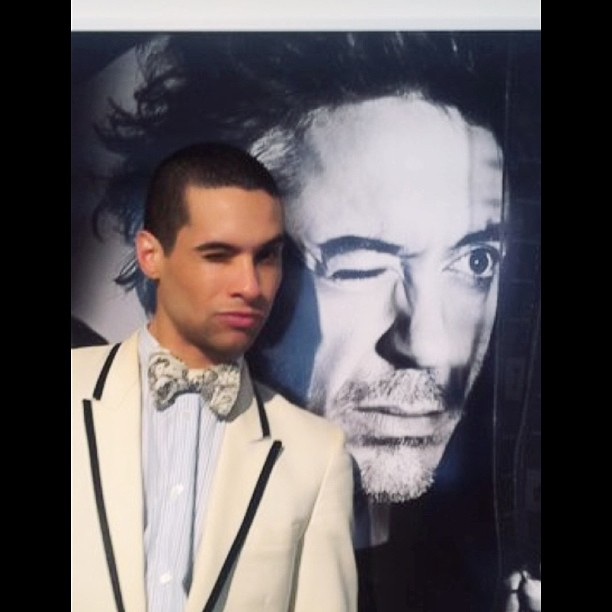
- Johnson in 2013
- Education: Deerfield Academy
- Alma mater: Trinity College; Sarah Lawrence College
- Occupation(s): writer television personality socialite

Paul Reid Johnson Calderon is an American writer, television personality, and socialite known for starring alongside Tinsley Mortimer in The CW's 2010 television series High Society.

== Personal life ==
Calderon was raised in New England, mainly Maine, and Northampton, Massachusetts, but also for a time resided in Berkeley, California. He has a close relationship with his mother. He is gay. Calderon attended Deerfield Academy and graduated in the class of 2003. He then went on to attend Trinity College and Sarah Lawrence College.

In 2011 Calderon was arrested after allegedly breaking into the Pi Kappa Alpha fraternity house at the University of Massachusetts.

In 2013 Calderon announced via social media that he was sober after admitting himself to McLean Hospital for treatment and partaking in the SMART Recovery program.

== Career ==
Calderon worked as a fashion stylist and assistant for Lauren Davis of Vogue Magazine for a short time. He is a former guest columnist, blogger, and market editor for Paper Magazine and also wrote for Deuxmoi.com.

After leaving Vogue, Johnson Calderon starred in The CW's reality television show High Society alongside other socially prominent New Yorkers.
