= Graymont (mansion) =

House in Richmond, Virginia

Coordinates: 37°33′49.75″N 77°30′30.49″W

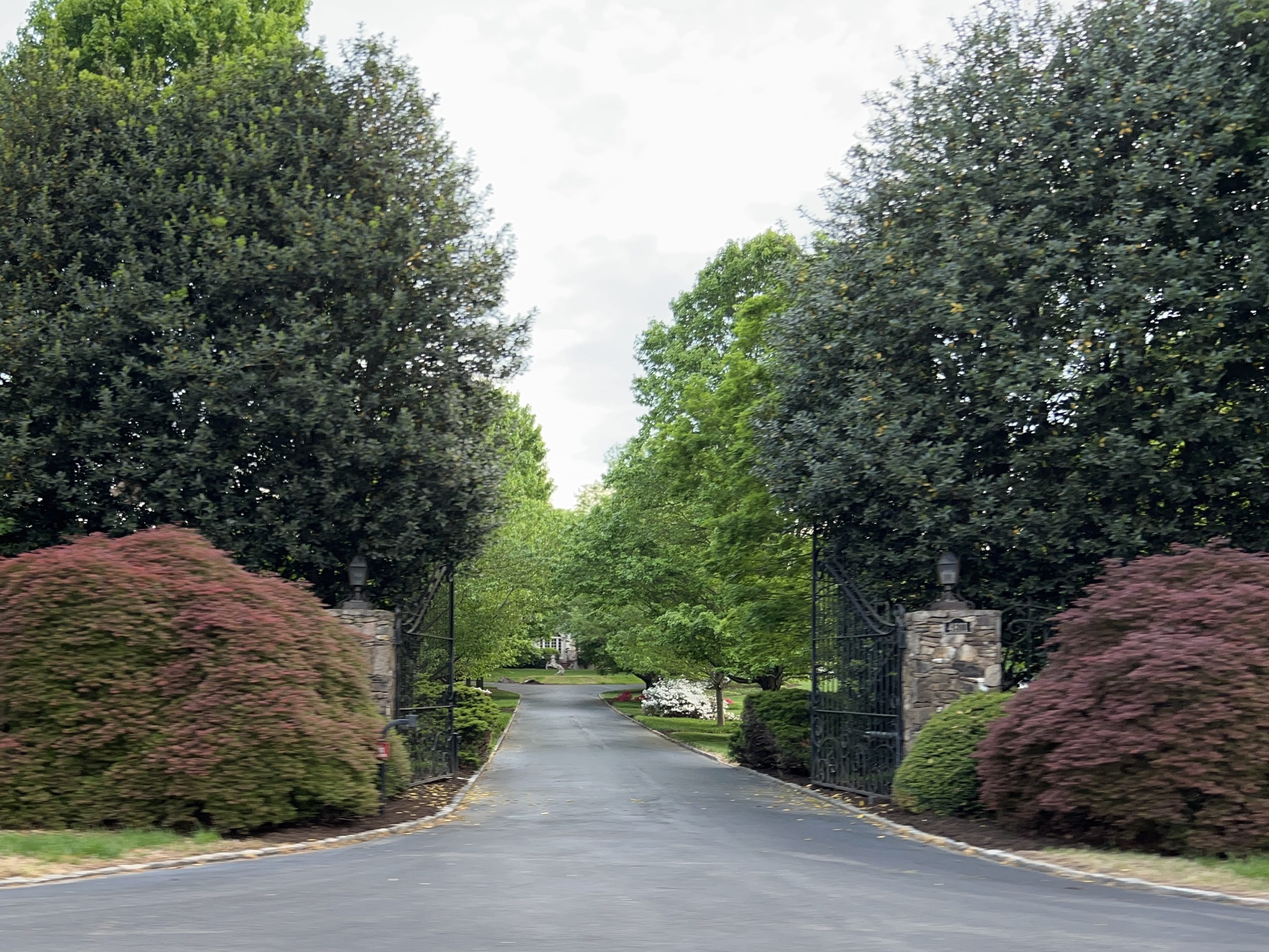
Entrance to Graymont.

Graymont is a historic mansion in Richmond, Virginia, US. The house, located near the Carytown District, was the childhood home of the socialite Tinsley Mortimer.

== History ==
The Graymont mansion was built in 1902 by tobacco businessman and attorney Archibald W. Patterson. The house, which is 7,000 square feet, is located on Cary Street in the Wilton neighborhood, near the Carytown district. The mansion was the childhood home of socialites Dabney Mercer and Tinsley Mortimer. In the 1990s the home was the source of a feud between two prominent Richmond families, the Mercers and the Gottwalds. A previous owner of Graymont, George R. Mercer II, was sued in 1994 by Bruce C. Gottwald II, who accused him of failing to disclose defects with the house at the time of the sale. The families eventually settled out of court. Gottwald then sold the house to Paul Mahefky, who spent two years renovating the house before selling it to David and Lucy Trebour.

In 2003 it was featured at Richmond's Historic Garden Week.
