= High Society (2010 TV series) =

- Genre: Reality
- Created by: Andrew Glassman; Tinsley Mortimer; Mike Aho
- Starring: Tinsley Mortimer; Paul Johnson Calderon; Dabney Mercer; Jules Kirby; Devorah Rose; Alexandra Osipow; Dale Mercer
- Opening theme: All the Right Moves by OneRepublic
- Country of origin: United States
- Original language: English
- No. of seasons: 1
- No. of episodes: 8

Production
- Executive producers: Andrew Glassman; Mike Aho
- Cinematography: Horea Laptes (Paris); Danny Stocker (Paris)
- Camera setup: Multi-camera
- Running time: approx. 20 mins
- Production companies: Glassman Media; IMG Media

Original release
- Network: The CW
- Release: March 10 – April 28, 2010

Related
- The Real Housewives of New York City

High Society is a reality show following the lives of Tinsley Mortimer, a Manhattan socialite, and her friends, which premiered on The CW on March 10, 2010.

It was originally scheduled to air every Wednesday at 9 pm after America's Next Top Model but due to low ratings the network decided to push it back half hour to air after Fly Girls.

== Starring ==
- Tinsley Mortimer, a famous New York City socialite. The series follows her through a widely publicized divorce from her husband Topper, the descendant of a Standard Oil president, and her dating a German prince whom her mother Dale does not approve.
- Dabney Mercer, Tinsley's younger sister and shoulder to cry on. Dabney lives with Jules Kirby at the Empire hotel, until Kirby is evicted.
- Paul Johnson Calderon, a fame-hungry socialite from the Upper West Side and admitted alcoholic who has already been through rehab several times and still drinks. He survives by repeatedly asking his mother for more money from his trust fund. He is the only male cast member of the series.
- Alexandra Osipow, Tinsley's loyal friend. She is an attorney and married to a Wall Street man.
- Jules Kirby, daughter of a successful lawyer, lives with Dabney at the Empire hotel before being evicted for her abusive behavior toward hotel staff.
- Devorah Rose (Deborah Denise Trachtenberg), editor-in-chief at Social Life magazine, and the series' main antagonist.
- Dale Mercer, mother of Tinsley and Dabney, divorced and later widowed from her daughters' father, joins a dating club for older women during filming.
- Prince Casimir zu Sayn-Wittgenstein-Sayn, a German aristocrat, son of Alexander, Prince zu Sayn-Wittgenstein-Sayn, and Tinsley's boyfriend. Dale disapproves of his relationship with her daughter. He appears in a recurring capacity.
- Tommy DiDario, a model who begins to date Paul Johnson Calderon, he decides to stop seeing him in the series finale.

== Episodes ==
=== Season 1 ===
The first season of High Society consisted of 8 episodes. It premiered on March 10, 2010 and finished Season 1 on April 28, 2010. The series premiered on March 10, 2010 on The CW, with 1.26 million viewers. The second episode of High Society improved over its premiere 22% in women 18-34 (1.1/3) and 13% in women 18-49 (0.9/2). The series averaged 0.8 million viewers. It was the lowest-rated primetime series on an American broadcast network for the 2009-10 television season.

No.	Title	Original release date	Prod. code	U.S. viewers (millions)
1	"She's Flying Solo"	March 10, 2010	101	1.26
2	"Prince Un-Charming"	March 17, 2010	102	1.20
3	"Plus One"	March 24, 2010	103	0.79
4	"Page Sixed"	March 31, 2010	104	0.75
5	"The War Is On"	April 7, 2010	105	1.04
6	"The Uninvited"	April 14, 2010	106	0.77
7	"Retail Therapy"	April 21, 2010	107	0.87
8	"Last Call"	April 28, 2010	108	0.80

=== Season 2 ===
A second season of High Society was rumored for a 2011 airdate. However, the show was officially cancelled on May 20, 2010.
