= St. Catherine's School (Richmond, Virginia) =

American Episcopal girls school

Location
- 6001 Grove Avenue; Richmond, Virginia 23226; United States; 37°34′16″N 77°31′17″W

Information
- Type: Private, day, college-prep
- Motto: Quæ Teneamus Perdimus, Quæ Demus Nobis Sunt (Latin) (What we keep we lose; what we give remains our own.)
- Denomination: Episcopal
- Established: 1890
- Oversight: Episcopal Diocese of Virginia
- Head of school: Cindy L. Trask
- Teaching staff: 103.5 (on a FTE basis)
- Grades: Early Learners (age 3)–12
- Gender: Girls
- Enrollment: 978, including 30 junior kindergarten (2016-17)
- Student to teacher ratio: 9.1
- Colors: Gold and white
- Athletics conference: Virginia Independent Schools Athletic Association
- Nickname: Saints
- Rival: The Collegiate School
- Yearbook: The Quair
- Website: www.st.catherines.org
- St. Catherine's School
- U.S. National Register of Historic Places
- U.S. Historic district
- Virginia Landmarks Register
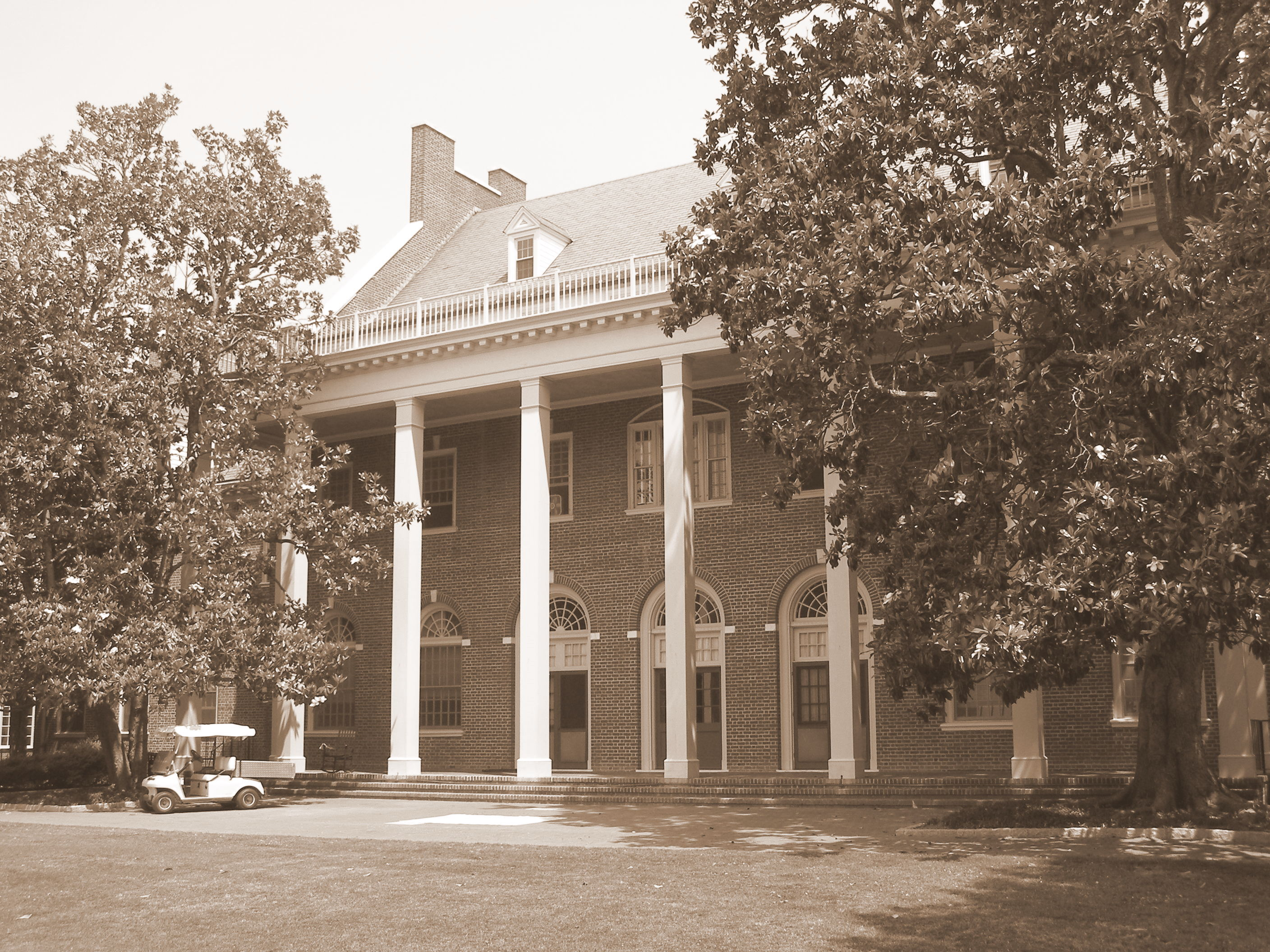

- Location within Virginia Location within the United States
- Location: 6001 Grove Ave., Richmond, Virginia
- Area: 14.9 acres (6.0 ha)
- Built: 1917
- Architect: Hobart Upjohn
- Architectural style: Colonial Revival
- NRHP reference No.: 07000400
- VLR No.: 127-5886

Significant dates
- Added to NRHP: May 04, 2007
- Designated VLR: March 7, 2007

St. Catherine's School is an independent Episcopal diocesan school in Richmond, Virginia, US. It is the oldest private, all-girls school in Richmond and the only independent all-girls school in Virginia for age 3 to grade 12. St. Catherine's is the sister school to St. Christopher's. The school was listed on the National Register of Historic Places and the Virginia Landmarks Register in 2008.

== History ==
St. Catherine's was founded in 1890 by Virginia Randolph Ellett during the middle of Richmond's New South movement.

In 1917, the school was incorporated and moved to its present site in the Westhampton area of Richmond. It was sold to the Episcopal Church in 1920 and renamed for St. Catherine, the patron saint of young women, especially those undergoing education.

St. Catherine’s School is an independent PK–12 school dedicated to educating girls. St. Catherine's equips students with the intellect and courage to enter a changing world with a confident voice and the sure-footed expectation that they are prepared for a life without limits.

Located in the heart of Richmond, Virginia, St. Catherine’s provides a well-rounded educational experience rooted in more than a century of history and tradition.

The School Motto is "What we keep we lose; only what we give remains our own."

The school has produced at least three newspapers: The Scrap Basket, Odds 'n' Ends and Arcadian. The longest running being The Arcadian, which was published from 1940 to 2007.

== Notable alumnae ==
- Adele Goodman Clark (1901), suffragette
- Nancy Astor, Viscountess Astor (1898), first female member of Parliament
- Anna Hill Johnstone (1930), costume designer
- Penny Williams (1955), Oklahoma State Senator
- Molly Haskell (1957), film critic, author
- Lee Smith (1963), author
- Charlotte Fox (1975), mountaineer
- Dagen McDowell (1987), news anchor and analyst
- Catharine F. Easterly (1988), judge of the District of Columbia Court of Appeals
- Tinsley Mortimer (1994), American socialite
- Darley Newman (1997), producer, TV host, writer
- Anne H. Charity Hudley, linguist
- Emily Tapscott Clark (1909), writer
- Kristin Rossum (1994), convicted murderer

== Notable faculty ==
- Lisa Grabarek, teacher and Baptist preacher
