= Defenders of State Sovereignty and Individual Liberties =

American pro-segregation group during the Civil Rights Era

- Formation: October 1954; 72 years ago
- Founded at: Petersburg, Virginia
- Dissolved: July 17, 1967; 59 years ago
- Headquarters: Richmond, Virginia
- Services: advocacy for strict segregation
- Members: 12,000 (1955)
- President: Richard Crawford

The Defenders of State Sovereignty and Individual Liberties was a political group dedicated to strict segregation in Virginia schools. In June 1955 it published its Plan for Virginia. The words of Richard Crawford, president of the Defenders, are recognizable today as dog-whistle politics.

The Defenders advocated an amendment to the state constitution to allow the creation of state tuition vouchers and to withdraw state funding for integrated schools. A ballot measure on January 9, 1956, passed by a vote of 304,154 to 146,164.

The organization was disbanded July 17, 1967.
