= 2007–08 United States network television schedule =

The 2007–08 network television schedule for the six major English language commercial broadcast networks in the United States covers the prime time hours from September 2007 to August 2008. The schedule is followed by a list per network of returning series, new series, and series canceled after the 2006–07 season. The schedule was affected by the 2007–08 Writers Guild of America strike (which began on November 5 and ended on February 12). After that, the next disruption to the networks' primetime schedules would not occur until the 2020–21 season, whose network schedules were affected by the suspension of film and television productions as a result of the COVID-19 pandemic.

NBC was the first to announce its fall schedule on May 14, 2007, followed by ABC on May 15, CBS on May 16, Fox and The CW on May 17, and MyNetworkTV on August 24, 2007.

This was the first TV season where Nielsen Media Research kept track of DVR ratings (live plus same day; C3; live plus 7).

PBS is not included; member stations have local flexibility over most of their schedules and broadcasts times for network shows may vary. Ion Television is also not included since the network's schedule consisted mainly of syndicated reruns and movies.

Each of the 30 highest-rated shows released in May 2008 is listed with its rank and rating as determined by Nielsen Media Research.

New series to broadcast television are highlighted in bold. Repeat airings or same-day rebroadcasts are indicated by (R).

All times are U.S. Eastern and Pacific Time (except for some live sports or events). Subtract one hour for Central, Mountain, Alaska, and Hawaii–Aleutian times.

All sporting events air live in all time zones in U.S. Eastern time, with local and/or late-night programming scheduled by affiliates after game completion.

All NBC programming from August 8, 2008, to August 24, 2008, was pre-empted for coverage of the 2008 Summer Olympics in Beijing.

== Impact of the 2007–08 Writers Guild of America strike ==
On November 5, the Writers Guild of America went on strike. During the strike, production on scripted television series across all of the major television networks was suspended. The writers' strike forced the networks to postpone the start of the fall 2007 schedule later than usual; rather than the traditional late-September/early-October start, new and returning series had their premieres delayed until late October and into November. The Writers Guild of America strike ended on February 12. The 2007–08 television season was thus the first of three television seasons to have its start delayed due to issues outside of the control of the major networks; the other instances were the 1988–89 season (due to the 1988 Writers Guild of America strike) and the 2001–02 season (due to the networks' news coverage of the September 11 attacks). The next major disruption to the primetime television schedules of the major television networks would not occur until the 2020–21 season (due to a suspension of television productions as a result of the COVID-19 pandemic). The third major disruption to the primetime television schedules of the major television networks were the 2022–23 season and the 2023–24 season (due to the 2023 Writers Guild of America strike, and the 2023 SAG-AFTRA strike).

== Legend ==
- Light blue indicates local programming.
- Gray indicates encore programming.
- Blue-gray indicates news programming.
- Light green indicates sporting events.
- Red indicates series being burned off and other irregularly scheduled programs, including specials and movies.
- Light gold indicates programming produced outside of the United States.
- Bronze indicates reairs of programming that originally aired on a cable channel or streaming service.
- highlight Yellow highlights indicates the top-10 most watched programs of the season.
- highlight Cyan highlights indicates numbers 11-20 most watched programs of the season.
- highlight Magenta highlights indicates numbers 21-30 most watched programs of the season.
- highlight Highlights indicates that it falls in multiple of the above categories.

== Sunday ==
Network		7:00 p.m.	7:30 p.m.	8:00 p.m.	8:30 p.m.	9:00 p.m.	9:30 p.m.	10:00 p.m.	10:30 p.m.
ABC	Fall	America's Funniest Home Videos		Extreme Makeover: Home Edition (21/7.7)		Desperate Housewives (6/11.6)		Brothers & Sisters (22/7.6) (Tied with CSI: NY, Heroes and Law & Order: Special Victims Unit)	
ABC	Winter	America's Funniest Home Videos		Extreme Makeover: Home Edition (21/7.7)		**Oprah's Big Give**		**Here Come the Newlyweds**	
ABC	Spring	America's Funniest Home Videos		Extreme Makeover: Home Edition (21/7.7)		Desperate Housewives (6/11.6)		Brothers & Sisters (22/7.6) (Tied with CSI: NY, Heroes and Law & Order: Special Victims Unit)	
ABC	Summer	America's Funniest Home Videos		**High School Musical: Get in the Picture**		Extreme Makeover: Home Edition (R)		Desperate Housewives (R)	
ABC	Mid-summer	America's Funniest Home Videos		Extreme Makeover: Home Edition (R)				Desperate Housewives (R)	
CBS	Fall	60 Minutes (17/8.4)		The Amazing Race		Cold Case (28/7.1) (Tied with Deal or No Deal)		Shark (30/7.0) (Tied with The Unit and Hell's Kitchen)	
CBS	Winter	60 Minutes (17/8.4)		Big Brother		Cold Case (28/7.1) (Tied with Deal or No Deal)		Dexter (R)	
CBS	Spring	60 Minutes (17/8.4)		**Million Dollar Password**		Cold Case (28/7.1) (Tied with Deal or No Deal)		Various programming	
CBS	Summer	60 Minutes (17/8.4)		Big Brother		**Million Dollar Password**		Cold Case (R)	
The CW	Fall	**CW Now**	**Online Nation**	**Life Is Wild**		America's Next Top Model (R)		Local programming	
The CW	Mid-fall	**CW Now**	**Aliens in** **America** (R)	**Life Is Wild**		America's Next Top Model (R)		Local programming	
The CW	Late fall	**CW Now**	**Aliens in** **America** (R)	**Life Is Wild**		**Crowned: The Mother of All Pageants** (R)		Local programming	
The CW	Winter	**CW Now**	Everybody Hates Chris (R)	Everybody Hates Chris	**Aliens in America**	Girlfriends (R)	The Game (R)	Local programming	
The CW	Spring	America's Next Top Model (R)		Everybody Hates Chris	**Aliens in America**	The Game	Girlfriends (R)	Local programming	
The CW	Summer	One Tree Hill (R)		Everybody Hates Chris	**Aliens in America**	The Game	Girlfriends (R)	Local programming	
Fox	Fall	Fox NFL (4:15 p.m.)	The OT	The Simpsons	King of the Hill	Family Guy	American Dad!	Local programming	
Fox	Winter	Various programming		The Simpsons	King of the Hill	Family Guy	American Dad!	Local programming	
Fox	Late winter	King of the Hill (R)	American Dad! (R)	The Simpsons	King of the Hill	Family Guy	**Unhitched**	Local programming	
Fox	Spring	King of the Hill (R)	The Simpsons (R)	The Simpsons	King of the Hill	Family Guy	American Dad!	Local programming	
Fox	Late spring	Don't Forget the Lyrics! (R)		The Simpsons	King of the Hill	Family Guy	American Dad!	Local programming	
Fox	Summer	'Til Death (R)		The Simpsons	King of the Hill	Family Guy	American Dad!	Local programming	
NBC	Fall	Football Night in America		NBC Sunday Night Football (8:15 p.m.) (10/9.7)					
NBC	Winter	Dateline NBC				Various programming			
NBC	Mid-winter	**American Gladiators** (R)				Various programming			
NBC	Late winter	Dateline NBC				Law & Order (R)		Law & Order: Special Victims Unit (R)	
NBC	Spring	Dateline NBC		Monk (R)		Psych (R)		Law & Order: Special Victims Unit (R)	
NBC	Mid-spring	Dateline NBC		The Office (R)				Law & Order: Special Victims Unit (R)	
NBC	Late spring	NBC Sports programming				Dateline NBC			
NBC	Summer	Most Outrageous Moments (R)		America's Got Talent (R)		Dateline NBC			

Notes:

- Extreme Makeover: Home Edition aired two-hour episodes on January 13 through January 27.
- Viva Laughlin aired two episodes (the pilot on October 18 and the 2nd episode on October 21) before it was cancelled.

== Monday ==
Network		8:00 p.m.	8:30 p.m.	9:00 p.m.	9:30 p.m.	10:00 p.m.	10:30 p.m.
ABC	Fall	Dancing with the Stars (3/14.0)			**Samantha Who?** (19/8.0)	The Bachelor	
ABC	Late fall	Special programming		**Samantha Who?** (19/8.0)	Notes from the Underbelly	October Road	
ABC	Winter	**Dance War: Bruno vs. Carrie Ann**			Notes from the Underbelly	October Road	
ABC	Spring	Dancing with the Stars (3/14.0)			**Samantha Who?** (19/8.0)	The Bachelor	
ABC	Late spring	The Bachelorette				The Mole	
ABC	Summer	**High School Musical: Get in the Picture**		**Wanna Bet?**		The Mole	
ABC	Mid-summer	**High School Musical: Get in the Picture**		**Samantha Who?** (R)		The Mole	
CBS	Fall	How I Met Your Mother	**The Big Bang Theory**	Two and a Half Men (15/8.5) (Tied with Survivor)	Rules of Engagement	CSI: Miami (11/9.2) (Tied with NCIS)	
CBS	Winter	How I Met Your Mother	**Welcome to the Captain**	Two and a Half Men (15/8.5) (Tied with Survivor)	The New Adventures of Old Christine	CSI: Miami (11/9.2) (Tied with NCIS)	
CBS	Late winter	**The Big Bang Theory**	How I Met Your Mother	Two and a Half Men (15/8.5) (Tied with Survivor)	The New Adventures of Old Christine	CSI: Miami (11/9.2) (Tied with NCIS)	
CBS	Spring	**The Big Bang Theory**	How I Met Your Mother	Two and a Half Men (15/8.5) (Tied with Survivor)	Rules of Engagement	CSI: Miami (11/9.2) (Tied with NCIS)	
CBS	Summer	**The Big Bang Theory**	How I Met Your Mother	Two and a Half Men (15/8.5) (Tied with Survivor)	The New Adventures of Old Christine (R)	CSI: Miami (11/9.2) (Tied with NCIS)	
The CW	Fall	Everybody Hates Chris	**Aliens in America**	Girlfriends	The Game	Local programming	
The CW	Winter	**Gossip Girl** (R)		Girlfriends	The Game	Local programming	
The CW	Mid-winter	**Gossip Girl** (R)		**Pussycat Dolls Present: Girlicious**		Local programming	
The CW	Spring	**Gossip Girl**		One Tree Hill		Local programming	
Fox	Fall	Prison Break		**K-Ville**		Local programming	
Fox	Late fall	House (R)		**K-Ville**		Local programming	
Fox	Winter	Prison Break		**Terminator: The Sarah Connor Chronicles**		Local programming	
Fox	Late winter	**New Amsterdam**		Various programming		Local programming	
Fox	Spring	Bones		House (8/10.5)		Local programming	
MNT	Fall	**Celebrity Exposé**		Various programming		Local programming	
MNT	Mid-fall	Breaking The Magician's Code (R)		**Celebrity Exposé**		Local programming	
MNT	Late fall	Special programming				Local programming	
MNT	Winter	**Celebrity Exposé**		Meet My Folks (R)		Local programming	
MNT	Mid-winter	**Celebrity Exposé**		**Paradise Hotel**		Local programming	
MNT	Spring	**Celebrity Exposé** (R)				Local programming	
MNT	Summer	**Celebrity Exposé** (R)		**Decision House**		Local programming	
NBC	Fall	**Chuck**		Heroes (22/7.6) (Tied with Brothers & Sisters, CSI: NY and Law & Order: Special Victims Unit)		**Journeyman**	
NBC	Winter	**American Gladiators**		Deal or No Deal (28/7.1) (Tied with Cold Case)		Medium	
NBC	Late winter	**My Dad Is Better than Your Dad**		Deal or No Deal (28/7.1) (Tied with Cold Case)		Medium	
NBC	Spring	Deal or No Deal (28/7.1) (Tied with Cold Case)				Medium	
NBC	Late spring	**American Gladiators**		Nashville Star		Dateline NBC	

Notes:

- NBC aired **Clash of the Choirs** for four consecutive nights starting on December 17, 2007.
- ABC aired **Duel** for six nights for the week starting on December 17, 2007.
- American Gladiators premiered Sunday, January 6, 2008, at 9:00 pm Eastern/8:00 pm Central before moving to Mondays at 8:00 pm Eastern/7:00 pm Central.
- Terminator: The Sarah Connor Chronicles premiered Sunday, January 13, 2008, at 8:00 pm Eastern/7:00 pm Central before moving to Mondays at 9:00 pm Eastern/8:00 pm Central.
- Season 7 of 24 was supposed to start in 2008, but delayed to 2009 due to the WGA strike.

== Tuesday ==
Network		8:00 p.m.	8:30 p.m.	9:00 p.m.	9:30 p.m.	10:00 p.m.	10:30 p.m.
ABC	Fall	**Cavemen**	**Carpoolers**	Dancing with the Stars (5/12.3)		Boston Legal	
ABC	Late fall	Special programming		According to Jim (R)		Boston Legal	
ABC	Winter	Just for Laughs	Just for Laughs (R)	According to Jim	**Carpoolers**	Boston Legal	
ABC	Late winter	Just for Laughs	Just for Laughs (R)	According to Jim	**Carpoolers**	**Primetime: What Would You Do?**	
ABC	Spring	According to Jim	According to Jim (R)	Dancing with the Stars (5/12.3)		Boston Legal	
ABC	Mid-spring	According to Jim	According to Jim (R)	Dancing with the Stars (5/12.3)		**Women's Murder Club**	
ABC	Late spring	According to Jim	According to Jim (R)	**Samantha Who?** (R)		Boston Legal (R)	
ABC	Summer	**Wipeout**		**I Survived a Japanese Game Show**		Primetime	
ABC	Mid-summer	**Wipeout**		**Wanna Bet?**		Primetime	
CBS	Fall	NCIS (11/9.2) (Tied with CSI: Miami)		The Unit (30/7.0) (Tied with Shark)		**Cane**	
CBS	Winter	NCIS (11/9.2) (Tied with CSI: Miami)		The Unit (30/7.0) (Tied with Shark)		48 Hours	
CBS	Mid-winter	NCIS (11/9.2) (Tied with CSI: Miami)		Big Brother		Jericho	
CBS	Spring	NCIS (11/9.2) (Tied with CSI: Miami)		Shark (30/7.0) (Tied with The Unit and Hell's Kitchen)		Various programming	
CBS	Late spring	NCIS (11/9.2) (Tied with CSI: Miami)		48 Hours		Without a Trace	
CBS	Summer	NCIS (11/9.2) (Tied with CSI: Miami)		Big Brother		Without a Trace	
The CW	Fall	Beauty and the Geek		**Reaper**		Local programming	
The CW	Winter	**Reaper** (R)		One Tree Hill		Local programming	
The CW	Late winter	Beauty and the Geek		One Tree Hill		Local programming	
The CW	Spring	Beauty and the Geek		**Reaper**		Local programming	
Fox	Fall	Bones		House (8/10.5)		Local programming	
Fox	Winter	American Idol (1/16.1)		House (8/10.5)		Local programming	
Fox	Mid-winter	American Idol (1/16.1)				Local programming	
Fox	Spring	American Idol (1/16.1)		Hell's Kitchen (30/7.0) (Tied with Shark and The Unit)		Local programming	
Fox	Late spring	**The Moment of Truth** (13/8.8) (Tied with Without a Trace)		Hell's Kitchen (30/7.0) (Tied with Shark and The Unit)		Local programming	
Fox	Summer	House (R)		Various programming		Local programming	
MNT	Fall	The Academy (R)		**JAIL**	**JAIL** (R)	Local programming	
MNT	Late fall	Special programming				Local programming	
MNT	Winter	**Street Patrol**	**Street Patrol** (R)	**JAIL**	**JAIL** (R)	Local programming	
NBC	Fall	The Singing Bee	The Biggest Loser			Law & Order: Special Victims Unit (22/7.6) (Tied with Brothers & Sisters, CSI: NY and Heroes)	
NBC	Winter	The Biggest Loser				Law & Order: Special Victims Unit (22/7.6) (Tied with Brothers & Sisters, CSI: NY and Heroes)	
NBC	Spring	Most Outrageous Moments	Most Outrageous Moments (R)	Law & Order: Special Victims Unit (R)		Law & Order: Special Victims Unit (22/7.6) (Tied with Brothers & Sisters, CSI: NY and Heroes)	
NBC	Summer	**Celebrity Family Feud**		America's Got Talent		Law & Order: Special Victims Unit (22/7.6) (Tied with Brothers & Sisters, CSI: NY and Heroes)	

Notes:

- According to Jim premiered on January 1, 2008, with two 30-minute episodes. Then on January 9, 2008, it only aired one episode for the night.
- One Tree Hill premiered on January 8, 2008, with a two-hour premiere.
- American Idol premiered on January 15 to 16, 2008 with two hour episodes each night.
- NBC aired **quarterlife** on February 26, 2008. After the first episode failed to earn the ratings the network had hoped, NBC announced that the series would be canceled after airing only one episode. Its remaining episodes would air on sibling channel Bravo.
- **Miss Guided** aired a "sneak-peek" on Tuesday, March 18, 2008, following Dancing with the Stars at 10:30 pm Eastern/9:30 pm Central. It then moved to its regular timeslot on March 20 at 8:00 pm Eastern/7:00 pm Central with back-to-back episodes filling in for Ugly Betty through April 3.
- On April 8, 2008, CBS premiered **Secret Talents of the Stars** at 10 pm Eastern/9 pm Central. The show was cancelled the following day.

== Wednesday ==
Network		8:00 p.m.	8:30 p.m.	9:00 p.m.	9:30 p.m.	10:00 p.m.	10:30 p.m.
ABC	Fall	**Pushing Daisies**		**Private Practice** (26/7.3)		**Dirty Sexy Money**	
ABC	Winter	Wife Swap		Supernanny		**Cashmere Mafia**	
ABC	Late winter	Wife Swap		Supernanny		Men in Trees	
ABC	Spring	Wife Swap		Supernanny		Boston Legal	
ABC	Late spring	Wife Swap		Supernanny		Men in Trees	
ABC	Summer	Wife Swap		Supernanny		Primetime: Crime	
CBS	Fall	**Kid Nation**		Criminal Minds (18/8.2)		CSI: NY (22/7.6) (Tied with Brothers & Sisters, Heroes and Law & Order: Special Victims Unit)	
CBS	Winter	Power of 10		Criminal Minds (18/8.2)		CSI: NY (22/7.6) (Tied with Brothers & Sisters, Heroes and Law & Order: Special Victims Unit)	
CBS	Mid-winter	Big Brother		Criminal Minds (18/8.2)		CSI: NY (22/7.6) (Tied with Brothers & Sisters, Heroes and Law & Order: Special Victims Unit)	
CBS	Spring	The Price Is Right $1,000,000 Spectacular		Criminal Minds (18/8.2)		CSI: NY (22/7.6) (Tied with Brothers & Sisters, Heroes and Law & Order: Special Victims Unit)	
CBS	Summer	**Greatest American Dog**		Criminal Minds (18/8.2)		CSI: NY (22/7.6) (Tied with Brothers & Sisters, Heroes and Law & Order: Special Victims Unit)	
The CW	Fall	America's Next Top Model		**Gossip Girl**		Local programming	
The CW	Late fall	**Crowned: The Mother of All Pageants**		**Gossip Girl**		Local programming	
The CW	Winter	America's Next Top Model		**Pussycat Dolls Present: Girlicious**		Local programming	
The CW	Spring	America's Next Top Model		**Farmer Wants a Wife**		Local programming	
The CW	Summer	America's Next Top Model		**Pussycat Dolls Present: Girlicious** (R)		Local programming	
Fox	Fall	**Back to You**	'Til Death	**Kitchen Nightmares**		Local programming	
Fox	Winter	American Idol (2/15.9)		**The Moment of Truth** (13/8.8) (Tied with Without a Trace)		Local programming	
Fox	Late winter	**The Moment of Truth** (13/8.8) (Tied with Without a Trace)		American Idol (2/15.9)		Local programming	
Fox	Spring	'Til Death	**Back to You**	American Idol (2/15.9)		Local programming	
Fox	Late spring	So You Think You Can Dance				Local programming	
MNT	Fall	**Decision House**		**Meet My Folks** (R)		Local programming	
MNT	Winter	**Whacked Out Videos**	**Whacked Out Videos** (R)	Special programming		Local programming	
MNT	Mid-winter	**Whacked Out Videos**	**Whacked Out Videos** (R)	**Masters of Illusion** (R)		Local programming	
MNT	Spring	**Under One Roof**	The Best of In Living Color	Breaking The Magician's Code (R)		Local programming	
MNT	Late spring	**Under One Roof**	The Best of In Living Color	**Masters of Illusion** (R)		Local programming	
MNT	Summer	**Under One Roof**	**Whacked Out Videos** (R)	The Twilight Zone (R)		Local programming	
MNT	Mid-summer	The Twilight Zone (R)		**Whacked Out Videos** (R)		Local programming	
NBC	Fall	Deal or No Deal		**Bionic Woman**		**Life**	
NBC	Mid-fall	**Phenomenon**		**Bionic Woman**		**Life**	
NBC	Winter	Deal or No Deal		Law & Order: Criminal Intent (R)		Law & Order (27/7.2)	
NBC	Spring	Deal or No Deal				Law & Order (27/7.2)	
NBC	Summer	**The Baby Borrowers** (R)		**The Baby Borrowers**		**Celebrity Circus**	
NBC	Mid-summer	America's Got Talent (R)		**The Baby Borrowers**		Law & Order (R)	

Notes:

- American Idol premiered on January 15, 2008, and January 16, 2008, with two-hour episodes each night.
- Crowned: The Mother of All Pageants premiered on December 12, 2007, at 9:00 pm Eastern/8:00PM Central before moving to Wednesdays at 8:00 pm Eastern/7:00PM Central.
- Law & Order had a two-hour season premiere (two episodes) on January 2, 2008.
- Supernanny aired back to back episodes on January 2, 2008.

== Thursday ==
Network		8:00 p.m.	8:30 p.m.	9:00 p.m.	9:30 p.m.	10:00 p.m.	10:30 p.m.
ABC	Fall	Ugly Betty		Grey's Anatomy (9/10.4)		**Big Shots**	
ABC	Winter	Lost (R)		Lost (20/7.9)		**Eli Stone**	
ABC	Spring	**Miss Guided**		Lost (20/7.9)		**Eli Stone**	
ABC	Mid-spring	Ugly Betty		Grey's Anatomy (9/10.4)		Lost (20/7.9)	
ABC	Summer	Ugly Betty		Grey's Anatomy (9/10.4)		**Hopkins**	
CBS	Fall	Survivor: China (15/8.5) (Tied with Two and a Half Men)		CSI: Crime Scene Investigation (7/10.6)		Without a Trace (13/8.8) (Tied with The Moment of Truth)	
CBS	Winter	Various programming		CSI: Crime Scene Investigation (7/10.6)		Without a Trace (13/8.8) (Tied with The Moment of Truth)	
CBS	Mid-winter	Survivor: Micronesia – Fans vs. Favorites (15/8.5) (Tied with Two and a Half Men)		CSI: Crime Scene Investigation (7/10.6)		Without a Trace (13/8.8) (Tied with The Moment of Truth)	
CBS	Spring	Various programming		CSI: Crime Scene Investigation (7/10.6)		**Swingtown**	
CBS	Summer	**Greatest American Dog**		CSI: Crime Scene Investigation (7/10.6)		**Swingtown**	
CBS	Mid-summer	Big Brother		CSI: Crime Scene Investigation (7/10.6)		**Flashpoint**	
The CW		Smallville		Supernatural		Local programming	
Fox	Fall	Are You Smarter than a 5th Grader?		Don't Forget the Lyrics!		Local programming	
Fox	Spring	So You Think You Can Dance				Local programming	
Fox	Late spring	Are You Smarter than a 5th Grader?		So You Think You Can Dance		Local programming	
MNT		My Thursday Night Movie				Local programming	
NBC	Fall	My Name Is Earl	30 Rock	The Office		ER	
NBC	Mid-fall	My Name Is Earl	30 Rock	The Office	Scrubs	ER	
NBC	Winter	My Name Is Earl	The Office (R)	Celebrity Apprentice		ER	
NBC	Mid-winter	Various programming		Celebrity Apprentice		**Lipstick Jungle**	
NBC	Spring	My Name Is Earl	30 Rock	The Office	Scrubs	ER	
NBC	Mid-spring	My Name Is Earl	Scrubs	The Office	30 Rock	ER	
NBC	Late spring	Various programming	Last Comic Standing			**Fear Itself**	
NBC	Summer	Last Comic Standing				**Fear Itself**	

Notes:

- Reaper moved to 9:00 pm Eastern/8:00 pm Central on February 28, 2008, replacing Supernatural.
- Miss Guided aired a "sneak-peek" on Tuesday March 18, 2008, following Dancing with the Stars at 10:30 pm Eastern/9:30 pm Central. It then moved to its regular timeslot on March 20 at 8:00 pm Eastern/7:00 pm Central with back-to-back episodes filling in for Ugly Betty through April 3.

== Friday ==
Network		8:00 p.m.	8:30 p.m.	9:00 p.m.	9:30 p.m.	10:00 p.m.	10:30 p.m.
ABC	Fall	20/20		**Women's Murder Club**		Men in Trees	
ABC	Mid-fall	Men in Trees		**Women's Murder Club**		20/20	
ABC	Winter	Grey's Anatomy (R)		Desperate Housewives (R)		20/20	
ABC	Mid-winter	Grey's Anatomy (R)		20/20			
ABC	Spring	America's Funniest Home Videos (R)		**Duel**		20/20	
ABC	Late spring	America's Funniest Home Videos (R)		According to Jim (R)		20/20	
ABC	Summer	**Dance Machine**		**Duel**		20/20	
ABC	Mid-summer	The ABC Friday Night Movie				20/20	
CBS	Fall	Ghost Whisperer		**Moonlight**		Numb3rs	
CBS	Winter	The Price Is Right $1,000,000 Spectacular		Ghost Whisperer		Numb3rs	
CBS	Spring	Ghost Whisperer		**Moonlight**		Numb3rs	
CBS	Late spring	Ghost Whisperer		Numb3rs (R)			
CBS	Summer	Ghost Whisperer		Numb3rs (R)		**Flashpoint**	
CBS	Mid-summer	Ghost Whisperer		Numb3rs (R)		**Swingtown**	
The CW		WWE Friday Night SmackDown				Local programming	
Fox	Fall	**The Next Great American Band**				Local programming	
Fox	Mid-fall	**The Next Great American Band**		Don't Forget the Lyrics!		Local programming	
Fox	Late fall	Don't Forget the Lyrics! (R)		**The Next Great American Band**		Local programming	
Fox	Winter	Bones (R)		House (R)		Local programming	
Fox	Spring	Bones (R)		**Canterbury's Law**		Local programming	
Fox	Mid-spring	Fox Friday Night Movie				Local programming	
MNT	Fall	My Friday Night Movie				Local programming	
MNT	Spring	Meet My Folks (R)		**Paradise Hotel** (R)		Local programming	
MNT	Summer	**The Academy** (R)		**Paradise Hotel** (R)		Local programming	
NBC	Fall	Deal or No Deal		Friday Night Lights		Las Vegas	
NBC	Winter	1 vs. 100		Friday Night Lights		Las Vegas	
NBC	Late winter	Amne$ia		Dateline NBC			
NBC	Spring	Most Outrageous Moments (R)		Dateline NBC			

Notes:

- Amne$ia premiered on February 22, 2008, at 9:00 pm Eastern/8:00 pm Central, before moving to its regular timeslot on February 29, 2008, at 8:00 pm Eastern/7:00 pm Central.

== Saturday ==
Network		8:00 p.m.	8:30 p.m.	9:00 p.m.	9:30 p.m.	10:00 p.m.	10:30 p.m.
ABC	Fall	Saturday Night Football (continued to game completion)					
ABC	Winter	ABC Saturday Movie of the Week					
ABC	Summer	The Wonderful World of Disney				**Eli Stone** (R)	
CBS		Crimetime Saturday				48 Hours	
Fox		COPS	COPS (R)	America's Most Wanted		Local programming	
MNT	Fall	IFL Battleground		**NFL Total Access**		Local programming	
MNT	Mid-fall	**NFL Total Access**		IFL Battleground		Local programming	
MNT	Winter	**NFL Total Access**		Paradise Hotel (R)		Local programming	
MNT	Spring	Meet My Folks (R)		**Decision House** (R)		Local programming	
MNT	Late spring	My Saturday Night Movie				Local programming	
NBC	Fall	Various programming		**Chuck** (R)		Law & Order: Special Victims Unit (R)	
NBC	Mid-fall	**Bionic Woman** (R)		**Chuck** (R)		Law & Order: Special Victims Unit (R)	
NBC	Winter	Law & Order: Criminal Intent (R)		Law & Order: Special Victims Unit (R)		Law & Order (R)	
NBC	Spring	Medium (R)		Law & Order: Criminal Intent (R)		Law & Order (R)	
NBC	Summer	Various programming		Law & Order (R)		Law & Order: Criminal Intent (R)	

== By network ==
=== ABC ===
**Returning series**

- 20/20
- The ABC Friday Night Movie
- ABC Saturday Movie of the Week
- According to Jim
- America's Funniest Home Videos
- The Bachelor
- The Bachelorette (Note: Series revival; previously aired on ABC in 2005.)
- Boston Legal
- Brothers & Sisters
- Dancing with the Stars
- Desperate Housewives
- Extreme Makeover: Home Edition
- Grey's Anatomy
- Just for Laughs
- Lost
- Men in Trees
- The Mole
- Notes from the Underbelly
- October Road
- Primetime
- Saturday Night Football
- Supernanny
- Ugly Betty
- Wife Swap
- The Wonderful World of Disney

**New series**

- **Big Shots**
- **Carpoolers**
- **Cashmere Mafia** *
- **Cavemen**
- **Dance Machine** *
- **Dance War: Bruno vs. Carrie Ann** *
- **Dirty Sexy Money**
- **Duel** *
- **Eli Stone** *
- **Here Come the Newlyweds** *
- **High School Musical: Get in the Picture** *
- **Hopkins** *
- **I Survived a Japanese Game Show** *
- **Miss Guided** *
- **Oprah's Big Give** *
- **Private Practice**
- **Primetime: What Would You Do?** *
- **Pushing Daisies**
- **Samantha Who?**
- **Wanna Bet?** *
- **Wipeout** *
- **Women's Murder Club**

Not returning from 2006–07:

- Big Day
- Day Break
- Extreme Makeover
- The Ex-Wives Club
- Fast Cars and Superstars
- Fat March
- George Lopez
- The Great American Dream Vote
- Help Me Help You
- i-Caught
- In Case of Emergency
- The Knights of Prosperity
- Masters of Science Fiction
- National Bingo Night
- The Next Best Thing
- The Nine
- Set for Life
- Shaq's Big Challenge
- Show Me the Money
- Six Degrees
- Traveler
- What About Brian

=== CBS ===
**Returning series**

- 48 Hours Mystery
- 60 Minutes
- The Amazing Race
- Big Brother
- Cold Case
- CSI: Crime Scene Investigation
- CSI: Miami
- CSI: NY
- Criminal Minds
- Dexter (reruns) (Note: A Showtime original series; airs repeats.)
- Ghost Whisperer
- How I Met Your Mother
- Jericho
- NCIS
- The New Adventures of Old Christine
- Numb3rs
- Power of 10
- Rules of Engagement
- Shark
- Survivor
- Two and a Half Men
- The Unit
- Without a Trace

**New series**

- **The Big Bang Theory**
- **Cane**
- **Flashpoint** *
- **Greatest American Dog** *
- **Kid Nation**
- **Million Dollar Password** *
- **Moonlight**
- **Secret Talents of the Stars** *
- **Swingtown** *
- **Viva Laughlin**
- **Welcome to The Captain** *

Not returning from 2006–07:

- 3 lbs
- Armed & Famous
- The Class
- Close to Home
- The King of Queens
- Smith

=== The CW ===
**Returning series**

- America's Next Top Model
- Beauty and the Geek
- Everybody Hates Chris
- The Game
- Girlfriends
- One Tree Hill
- Pussycat Dolls Present: Girlicious
- Smallville
- Supernatural
- WWE SmackDown

**New series**

- **Aliens in America**
- **Crowned: The Mother of All Pageants**
- **CW Now**
- **Farmer Wants a Wife** *
- **Gossip Girl**
- **Life Is Wild**
- **Online Nation**
- **Reaper**

Not returning from 2006–07:

- 7th Heaven
- All of Us
- Gilmore Girls
- Hidden Palms
- Reba
- Runaway
- Veronica Mars (revived to Hulu in 2019)

=== Fox ===
**Returning series**

- America's Most Wanted
- American Dad!
- American Idol
- Are You Smarter than a 5th Grader?
- Bones
- Cops
- Don't Forget the Lyrics!
- Family Guy
- Fox Friday Night Movie
- Hell's Kitchen
- House
- King of the Hill
- NFL on Fox
- The OT
- Prison Break
- The Simpsons
- So You Think You Can Dance
- 'Til Death

**New series**

- **Back to You**
- **Canterbury's Law** *
- **K-Ville**
- **Kitchen Nightmares**
- **Nashville**
- **New Amsterdam** *
- **The Moment of Truth** *
- **The Next Great American Band**
- **The Return of Jezebel James** *
- **Terminator: The Sarah Connor Chronicles** *
- **Unhitched** *
- **When Women Rule the World**

Not returning from 2006–07:

- 24 (returned for 2008–09)
- Drive
- Happy Hour
- Justice
- Nanny 911 (Moved to CMT)
- The O.C.
- The Rich List
- Standoff
- Vanished
- The War at Home
- The Wedding Bells
- The Winner

=== MyNetworkTV ===
**Returning series**

- Breaking the Magician's Code: Magic's Biggest Secrets Finally Revealed (moved from Fox)
- IFL Battleground
- Meet My Folks (moved from NBC)
- My Thursday Night Movie
- My Friday Night Movie
- My Saturday Night Movie (summer)
- Paradise Hotel 2 (season one on Fox)
- The Best of In Living Color (moved from Fox)
- The Twilight Zone (moved from UPN)

**New series**

- **The Academy**
- **Celebrity Exposé**
- **Control Room Presents**
- **Decision House**
- **Jail**
- **Masters of Illusion**
- **NFL Total Access**
- **Street Patrol**
- **Under One Roof** *
- **Whacked Out Videos**

Not returning from 2006–07:

- American Heiress
- Desire
- Fashion House
- Saints & Sinners
- Wicked Wicked Games
- Watch Over Me

=== NBC ===
**Returning series**

- 1 vs. 100
- 30 Rock
- America's Got Talent
- The Apprentice
- The Biggest Loser
- Deal or No Deal
- ER
- Friday Night Lights
- Football Night in America
- Heroes
- Las Vegas
- Last Comic Standing
- Law & Order
- Law & Order: Criminal Intent (reruns) (Note: A USA Network original series; airs repeats; previously aired on NBC from 2001 to 2007.)
- Law & Order: Special Victims Unit
- Medium
- Monk (reruns) (Note: A USA Network original series; airs repeats.)
- Most Outrageous Moments
- My Name Is Earl
- Nashville Star (moved from USA Network)
- NBC Sunday Night Football
- The Office
- Psych (reruns)
- Scrubs

**New series**

- **American Gladiators** *
- **Amnesia** *
- **The Baby Borrowers** *
- **Bionic Woman**
- **Celebrity Circus** *
- **Celebrity Family Feud** *
- **Chuck**
- **Clash of the Choirs**
- **Fear Itself** *
- **Journeyman**
- **Life**
- **Lipstick Jungle** *
- **My Dad Is Better Than Your Dad** *
- **Phenomenon**
- **Quarterlife** *
- **The Singing Bee**

Not returning from 2006–07:

- Andy Barker, P.I.
- The Black Donnellys
- Crossing Jordan
- Grease: You're the One that I Want!
- Identity
- Kidnapped
- Law & Order: Criminal Intent (moved to USA Network)
- Raines
- The Real Wedding Crashers
- Studio 60 on the Sunset Strip
- Thank God You're Here
- Twenty Good Years

== Full season orders and cancellations ==
=== Full season orders ===
The following are shows that have been given full seasons during the 2007/08 television season. Shows listed in Bold returned for the 2008/09 television season.

ABC

- Private Practice – On October 19, 2007, the show was given a full 22-episode season.
- Pushing Daisies – On October 23, 2007, the show received the order for nine additional episodes comprising a full season.
- Samantha Who? – On October 30, 2007, the show received a full season order due to solid retention of the audience from Dancing with the Stars in both total viewers, consistently finishing 1st place in its timeslot, and the key 18-49 demographic, consistently finishing in 2nd in its timeslot.
- Dirty Sexy Money – On November 16, 2007, the show was given a full season order, making it the first show to be ordered a full season since the writers strike began on November 5.

CBS

- The Big Bang Theory – On October 19, 2007, the show was given a full 22-episode season.
- The Unit - On October 19, 2007, the show was given a full 22-episode season order.

Fox

- Kitchen Nightmares – On October 16, 2007, the show was renewed for another season of 10 episodes.
- The Moment of Truth – On February 1, 2008, Fox ordered an additional 13 episodes, bringing the total episode order to 25.

NBC

- Chuck– On November 26, 2007, NBC gave a full 22-episode season to the show.
- Life – On November 26, 2007, NBC gave a full 22-episode season to the show.

The CW

- Gossip Girl – On October 9, 2007, the show was given a full 22-episode season, making it the first new show to do so.
- Aliens in America – Although a full season order has not been officially announced, sources have reported that despite the writers strike this show will have 17 episodes for the season.

=== Cancellations ===
==== ABC ====
- Big Shots – All 11 produced episodes aired and on February 12, 2008, ABC announced no new episodes would be produced after the strike, effectively cancelling the show.
- Carpoolers – 13 produced episodes aired and on February 12, 2008, ABC announced no new episodes would be produced after the strike, effectively cancelling the show.
- Cashmere Mafia – ABC announced on March 13, 2008, that the show will not return.
- Cavemen – 6 of the 13 produced episodes aired, and on February 12, 2008, ABC announced no new episodes would be produced after the strike, effectively cancelling the show.
- Men in Trees – ABC announced on May 4, 2008, that the show will not return next season.
- Miss Guided – Canceled on May 12, 2008
- Notes from the Underbelly – Canceled on May 12, 2008
- October Road – Canceled on May 12, 2008.
- Women's Murder Club – Canceled on May 12, 2008.

==== CBS ====
- Cane – Canceled on May 14, 2008.
- Jericho – CBS announced on March 21, 2008, that the show will not return for another season.
- Kid Nation – Canceled on May 14, 2008.
- Moonlight – Canceled on May 14, 2008
- Power of 10 – The show was canceled on April 30, 2008, in favor of The Price Is Right $1,000,000 Spectacular; the two series shared the same host (Drew Carey).
- Secret Talents of the Stars – Canceled after one episode due to low ratings.
- Shark - Canceled on May 14, 2008
- Viva Laughlin – Canceled on October 22, 2007, after airing only two episodes. The previously unscheduled The Amazing Race started early and took over the timeslot.
- Welcome to The Captain – After the 5th episode aired, the show was canceled due to poor ratings.

==== The CW ====
- Aliens in America – Canceled on May 9, 2008. The final episode aired on May 18, 2008.
- Girlfriends – After 8 seasons and 172 episodes, on February 12, 2008, The CW announced no more new episodes will be produced and the show was officially canceled. While there will not be any additional episodes produced for the season, a series finale/retrospective for the show is in talks.
- Life Is Wild – All 13 produced episodes aired and on February 12, 2008, The CW announced no new episodes would be produced after the strike, effectively cancelling the show.
- Online Nation – First show to be canceled in the 2007–08 season. This show set a record for the lowest ratings in The CW's brief history.
- WWE SmackDown – On February 8, 2008 World Wrestling Entertainment and The CW had ended negotiations to keep Friday Night SmackDown! on the network. WWE stated that Friday Night SmackDown! would continue to air on The CW through the end of the 2007/08 broadcast season. On February 26, 2008, WWE announced that MyNetworkTV picked up Friday Night Smackdown for the 2008/09 television season.
- CW Now – It was announced that in early February, 2008, that CW Now would be going on hiatus. However, on February 13, 2008, The CW announced that they were cancelling CW Now after the February 24 episode.

==== Fox ====
- Back to You—Canceled on May 10, 2008.
- Canterbury's Law—Canceled on May 15, 2008.
- K-Ville—Canceled on February 12, 2008.
- The Moment of Truth—Canceled on August 6, 2009.
- Nashville—Canceled on October 19, 2007.
- New Amsterdam—Canceled on May 11, 2008.
- The Next Great American Band—Canceled on May 15, 2008.
- The Return of Jezebel James—Canceled on March 24, 2008.
- Unhitched—Canceled on May 15, 2008.

==== NBC ====
- 1 vs. 100 – Canceled at the 2008 upfront presentation.
- American Gladiators – NBC decided not to renew the show for a third season, even though there were plans that got canceled
- Amne$ia – Canceled at the 2008 upfront presentation.
- Bionic Woman – All 8 produced episodes aired and on February 12, 2008, NBC announced no new episodes would be produced after the strike, effectively cancelling the show.
- My Dad Is Better Than Your Dad – Canceled at the 2008 upfront presentation.
- Journeyman – The last of 13 produced episodes aired on December 19, 2007. NBC did not order a full-season run by the deadline of December 11, 2007, effectively cancelling the series.
- Las Vegas – After 5 seasons and 106 episodes, NBC announced the cancellation of the series on February 20. The final episode, which aired on February 15, was a cliffhanger.
- Phenomenon – Canceled at the 2008 upfront presentation.
- Quarterlife – The web-series-turned-network-program was canceled on NBC after one episode due to low ratings, the lowest NBC had received in that time slot in 17 years. NBC Universal announced the series would continue on co-owned cable network Bravo.
- Heroes: Origins – The series was canceled before it aired and was confirmed at the upfronts.
- Scrubs – After seven seasons, NBC announced that the show would not return. However, ABC picked it up for the 2008/09 season.
- The Singing Bee – Canceled at the 2008 upfront presentation.
