= List of programs broadcast by MyNetworkTV =

This is a list of programming which has been or will be carried on the American broadcast programming service MyNetworkTV.

== Current programming ==
=== Acquired programming ===
==== Dramas ====
- Chicago Fire (2021–present)
- Chicago P.D. (2018–24; 2025–present)
- FBI: Most Wanted (2026–present)

==== Reality/non-scripted ====
- Dateline (2017–present)

== Former programming ==
=== Original programming ===
==== Dramas ====
- Desire (2006)
- Fashion House (2006)
- Watch Over Me (2006–07)
- Wicked Wicked Games (2006–07)
- American Heiress (2007)
- Saints & Sinners (2007)

==== Comedies ====
- Under One Roof (2008–09)

==== Reality/non-scripted ====
- The Academy (2007)
- Breaking the Magician's Code (2007–09)
- Celebrity Exposé (2007–09)
- Control Room Presents (2007–08)
- Decision House (2007–08)
- IFL Battleground (2007–08)
- Jail (2007–09)
- Masters of Illusion (2009)
- My GamesFever (2006–07, broadcast only on MyNetworkTV's Fox owned-and-operated stations)
- NFL Total Access (2007–08)
- Paradise Hotel (2008)
- Street Patrol (2008–09)
- The Tony Rock Project (2008–09)
- WWE SmackDown (2008–10)
- World's Funniest Moments (2008–09)

=== Movies ===
- My Friday Night Movie (2007–08)
- My Saturday Night Movie (2008–09)

=== Specials ===
- World Music Awards (2007)
- Happy Birthday, Elton (2007)
- Hawaiian Tropic International Beauty Pageant (2007)
- Ujena Bikini Jam (2007)
- Hooters Dream Girl Challenge
- Night of a Million Laughs: Comics Unleashed (2007)
- Eddie Murphy: 25th Anniversary of 'Delirious' (2007)
- Taurus World Stunt Awards (2007)
- Celebrity Daredevils (2007)
- AVP Volleyball specials (2007–08)
- Santa's Funniest Moments (2007)
- Holidaze: The Christmas That Almost Didn't Happen (2007; originally aired on various local channels in 2006)
- Christmas Glory: In the Key of Love (2007)
- Christmas at the Cathedral (2007)
- World Magic Awards (2007)
- Masters of Illusion: Impossible Magic (2008)
- Secrets of Psychics Revealed (2008)
- The Harlem Globetrotters 80th Anniversary Special (2008)
- Impossible Escapes (2008)
- Heroes Among Us: The 2008 Hero Awards (2008)
- The Tour of Gymnastics Superstars (2008)
- WrestleMania XXIV (2008)

=== Acquired programming ===
==== Dramas ====
- The Twilight Zone (2008–09)
- Law & Order: Criminal Intent (2009–11; 2013–15; 2017–21)
- The Unit (2009–10)
- Burn Notice (2010–12)
- Without a Trace (2010–12)
- Monk (2010–14)
- Cold Case (2011–12)
- Law & Order: Special Victims Unit (2011–18; 2019–2026)
- House (2012–14)
- Numbers (2012–13)
- White Collar (2012–13)
- Bones (2013–17)
- The Mentalist (2014–16)
- The Walking Dead (2014–16)
- The Closer (2015–16)
- Agents of S.H.I.E.L.D. (2016–17)
- The X-Files (2016–18)
- CSI: Miami (2018–20)
- The Good Wife (2018–19)
- Suits (2024–25)

==== Reality/non-scripted ====
- America's Funniest Home Videos (some affiliates + O&Os) (2006–13)
- American Ninja Warrior (2016–18)
- Are You Smarter than a 5th Grader? (2009–11)
- Comics Unleashed (2008–09)
- Deal or No Deal (2009–10)
- Don't Forget the Lyrics! (2010–11)
- The Best of In Living Color (2007–08)
- Meet My Folks (2007–08)
- Whacked Out Videos (2008–09)
- Vice Squad (2009)
