= Christopher Dorner shootings and manhunt =

2013 murders in California

Christopher Jordan Dorner shootings and manhunt
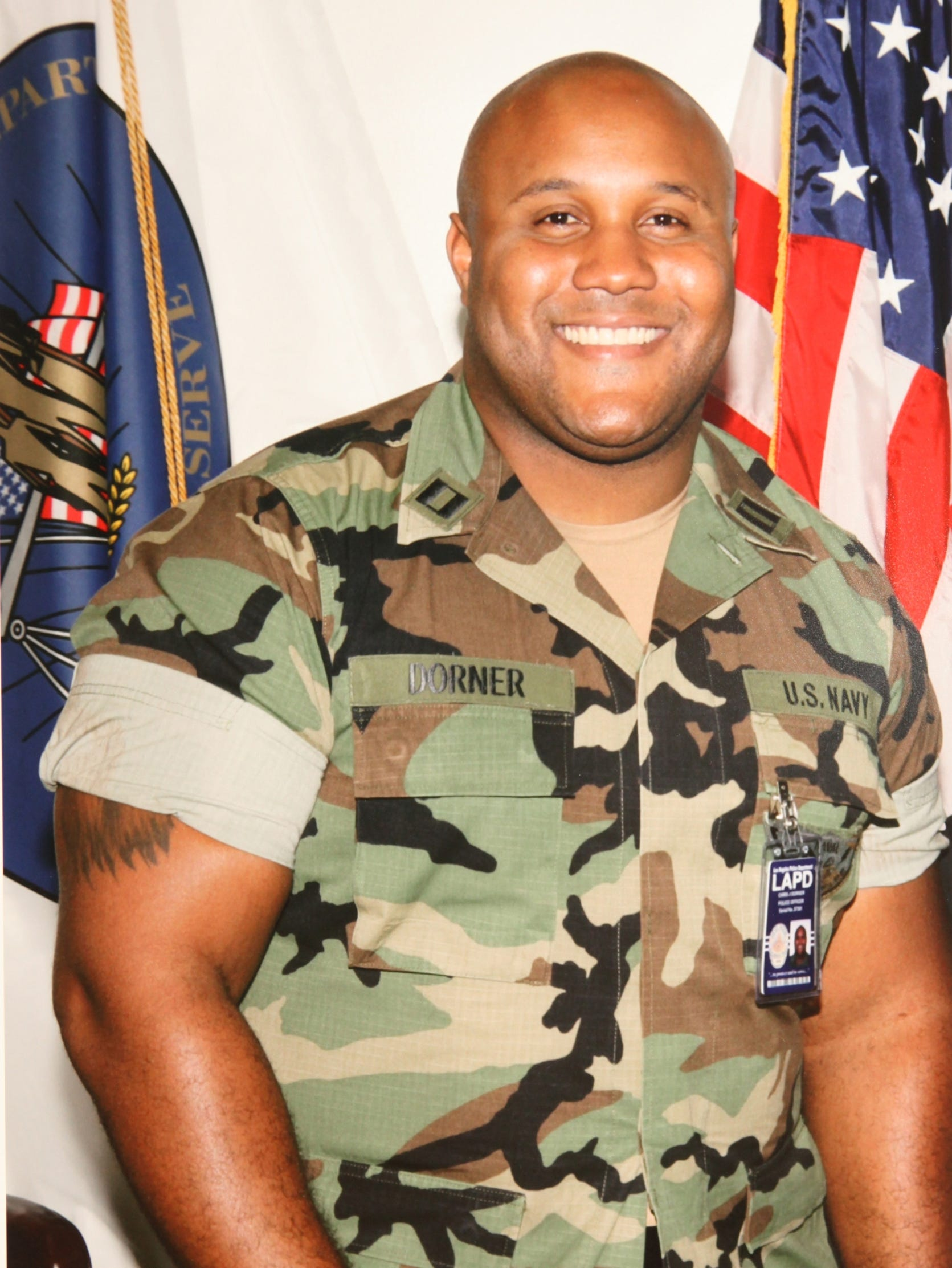
- Los Angeles Police Department faculty photograph of Dorner
- Location: Los Angeles County, Orange County, Riverside County, San Bernardino County, San Diego County
- Date: February 3–12, 2013
- Attack type: Siege, spree killing, shootout, domestic terrorism, murder-suicide
- Weapons: Bushmaster XM-15; Remington 700; Smoke bombs; Suppressed Walther P22
- Deaths: 5 (including the perpetrator)
- Injuries: 6 (3 by the perpetrator, 2 by LAPD, 1 by Torrance P.D.)
- Perpetrator: Christopher Jordan Dorner

Christopher Jordan Dorner (June 4, 1979 – February 12, 2013) was a former officer of the Los Angeles Police Department (LAPD) who, beginning on February 3, 2013, committed a series of killings against the LAPD in Orange County, Los Angeles County, Riverside County and San Bernardino County in the U.S. state of California. The victims were law enforcement officers and the daughter of a retired police captain. Dorner killed four people and wounded three others. On February 12, Dorner was cornered by police in a cabin in the woods that was set on fire where he killed himself after a shootout with the San Bernardino County Sheriff's Department deputies in the San Bernardino Mountains.

A manifesto posted by Dorner on social media declared "unconventional and asymmetric warfare" upon the LAPD, their families and their associates unless the department admitted publicly he was fired in retaliation for reporting excessive force.

== Background ==
=== Early life ===
Christopher Jordan Dorner was born on June 4, 1979, and grew up in southern California. He attended Cypress High School in Cypress, California, where he graduated in 1997. He later graduated from Southern Utah University in 2001, with a major in political science and a minor in psychology. While there, he was a running back on the university's football team from 1999 to 2000.

Dorner later stated that he was the only African-American student in his school from first grade to seventh grade, and that he had altercations due to racism. When he was a teenager, he decided to become a police officer and joined a youth program offered by the police department in La Palma, where he lived at the time of the shootings. Neighbors described Dorner as belonging to an admired, well-liked family and a man who usually kept to himself. He was previously married, with two children. Court records show his wife filed for divorce in 2007.

=== Navy reservist ===
Dorner was a United States Navy Reserve officer, commissioned in 2002. He commanded a security unit at the Naval Air Station Fallon in Nevada, served with a Mobile Inshore Undersea Warfare Unit from June 2004 to February 2006, and was deployed to Bahrain with Coastal Riverine Group Two from November 2006 to April 2007. He was honorably discharged from the Navy Reserve on February 1, 2013, with the rank of lieutenant.

In 2002, while a student in Undergraduate Pilot Training at Vance Air Force Base in Enid, Oklahoma, Dorner and a classmate found a bag containing nearly US$8,000 (equivalent to about $14,300 in 2025) that belonged to the nearby Enid Korean Church of Grace. The two handed the money to the police. When asked their motive, Dorner replied that, "The military stresses integrity. ... There was a couple of thousand dollars, and if people are willing to give that to a church, it must be pretty important to them." Dorner also stated his mother taught him honesty and integrity. During his time as a reservist, Dorner received a Navy Rifle Marksmanship Ribbon and a Navy Pistol Shot Ribbon with expert device.

=== Los Angeles Police Department ===
During his time as a naval reservist, Dorner joined the Los Angeles Police Department (LAPD). He entered the police academy in 2005 and graduated in 2006. Shortly afterwards, his duties as a probationary officer were interrupted when he was deployed by the Navy Reserve to Bahrain. On his return from duty in July 2007, Dorner was paired with training officer Teresa Evans to complete his probationary training. According to the Los Angeles Times, Evans said that on Dorner's first day working with her, he told her that he planned to sue the LAPD after he completed his probationary period, in response to how the department had responded to complaints he had previously made against his classmates.

==== Allegations against training officer ====
On July 28, 2007, Dorner and Evans responded to the Doubletree Hotel in San Pedro regarding a disturbance being caused by Christopher Gettler, who had schizophrenia with severe dementia. Dorner filed a report alleging that Evans had used excessive force in her treatment of Gettler, accusing her of twice kicking Gettler in the chest and once in the face while he was handcuffed and lying on the ground. Gettler's father testified that his son told him he had been kicked by a police officer. Dorner filed the report the day after being told that Evans's evaluation said Dorner needed to improve his performance.

The LAPD investigated Dorner's complaint, examining the allegation against Evans and the truthfulness of Dorner's report, through an internal review board of three members—two LAPD captains and a criminal defense attorney. During the seven-month investigation of the complaint, Evans was assigned to desk duty and was not allowed to earn money outside of her LAPD job. Dorner's attorney at the board hearing was former LAPD captain Randal Quan.

The review board heard testimony from a number of witnesses. Two hotel employees testified that they did not see Evans kick Gettler. Additionally, a port police officer testified that he did not see Evans kick Gettler, though some aspects of his statement contradicted photographs from the scene. Gettler was brought to the police station and given medical treatment for injuries to his face, but did not mention being kicked at that time. According to his father, later that day, Gettler claimed that he had been kicked by an officer, and his father testified to that at Dorner's disciplinary hearing. In a videotaped interview with Dorner's attorney, shown at the hearing, Gettler stated that he was kicked in the face by a female police officer on the day and in the place in question; however, when Gettler testified at the hearing, his responses to questioning were described as "generally ... incoherent and nonresponsive." The investigation concluded that the kicking incident did not take place and, later, decided that Dorner had lied.

==== Termination and failed appeal ====
In 2008, Dorner was fired by the LAPD for making false statements in his report and in his testimony against Evans. Dorner's attorney, Quan, stated that he was treated unfairly and was being made a scapegoat. Dorner appealed his termination by filing a petition for a writ of mandamus with the Los Angeles County Superior Court. Judge David Yaffe wrote that he was "uncertain whether the training officer kicked the suspect or not" but nevertheless upheld the department's decision to fire Dorner, according to the Times. Yaffe ruled that he would presume that the LAPD's accusations that Dorner's report was false would stand, even though he did not know if the report was indeed false. This enraged Dorner, who yelled out in disbelief at the end of the hearing: "I told the truth! How can this [ruling] happen?"

Dorner appealed to the California Court of Appeal, which affirmed the lower court's ruling on October 3, 2011. Under California law, administrative findings (in this case by the LAPD) are entitled to a presumption of correctness and the petitioner (in this case Dorner) bears the burden of proving that they were incorrect. The appeals court concluded that the LAPD had substantial evidence for its finding that Dorner was not credible in his allegations against Evans.

==== Manifesto ====
In early February 2013, coincident with the start of a series of revenge shootings, Dorner was purported to have posted a detailed note on his Facebook page, discussing his history, motivations and plans. This 11,000-word post became known as his "manifesto".

Dorner listed forty law enforcement personnel whom he was prepared to kill and stated: "I know most of you who personally know me are in disbelief to hear from media reports that I am suspected of committing such horrendous murders and have taken drastic and shocking actions in the last couple of days", the posting began. "Unfortunately, this is a necessary evil that I do not enjoy but must partake and complete for substantial change to occur within the LAPD and reclaim my name. The department has not changed since the Rampart and Rodney King days. It has gotten worse...." Dorner issued a single demand: a public admission by the LAPD that his termination was in retaliation for reporting excessive force. He also asked journalists to pursue "the truth", pointing out specific lines of investigation for them to follow under the Freedom of Information Act.

On February 9, 2013, in response to the manifesto and the start of the killing spree (February 3), LAPD Chief Charlie Beck informed Dorner through the media that there would be a review of the disciplinary case that led to his dismissal. Beck said officials would re-examine the allegations by Dorner that his law enforcement career was undone by racist colleagues.

== Timeline of killings and manhunt ==
Dorner's actions began with a package stating his complaints, sent to Anderson Cooper and arriving at CNN on February 1, 2013. After the first killings, the threats in his manifesto caused law enforcement to mount a widespread manhunt that spread from California to Nevada and Mexico. Protection details were set up for over forty potential targets of Dorner, and thousands of police officers were assigned to patrol highways across southern California. The LAPD also took patrol officers off motorcycles for their protection.

=== February 1 ===
Anderson Cooper received a package at his office containing a DVD that stated Dorner's case against the LAPD. The package also contained a bullet-riddled challenge coin issued by LAPD Chief William Bratton and a note inscribed with "1MOA" (one minute of angle), implying that the coin was shot at 100 yards (91 metres) at a grouping of 1 inch (2.5 centimetres), boasting of his accuracy with a rifle.

=== February 3 ===
In Irvine, California, during the evening hours, 28-year-old Monica Quan and her fiancé, 27-year-old Keith Lawrence, were shot dead in Lawrence's parked white Kia Optima outside their condominium complex. Quan, a women's basketball assistant coach at Cal State Fullerton, was the daughter of Randal Quan, the former LAPD captain who represented Dorner at his 2008 dismissal hearing. Lawrence was a campus public safety officer for the University of Southern California.

=== February 4 ===
Dorner's "manifesto" was posted online, stating his motive for the shootings. (Note: An unredacted copy of Dorner's manifesto was published online, but then had redactions added: "Read Murder Suspect Chris Dorner's Online Manifesto About Slayings (redacted)". KTTV/MyFoxLA.com. February 6, 2013. Archived from the original on February 28, 2015.) He wrote, "I will not be alive to see my name cleared. That's what this is about, my name."

=== February 5 ===
According to military sources, Dorner checked into Naval Base Point Loma in San Diego, but skipped checkout procedures when leaving.

=== February 6 ===
Dorner's manifesto specifically named Randal Quan and his family as targets, leading Irvine police to name Dorner as the prime suspect in the murders of Monica Quan and Keith Lawrence. The manifesto claimed Quan had failed to represent Dorner's interests in favor of those of the LAPD. Dorner reported specific acts of specific officers participating in the retaliation, but their names were redacted by media sources at the request of law enforcement who cited officer safety concerns.

=== February 7 ===
Two LAPD officers were driving to a protection detail, where they were assigned as security for one of the officers potentially targeted by Dorner, when they were flagged down by R. L. McDaniel at about 1:00 am. McDaniel reported seeing a man matching Dorner's description at a gas station in Corona. The officers investigated the report, and they were following a pickup truck when the driver stopped, got out, and fired a rifle at them, grazing the head of one officer.

About twenty minutes after the Corona shooting, two officers of the police department in neighboring Riverside were ambushed and shot while stopped in their marked patrol unit at a red traffic light. One officer, Michael Crain, died shortly after the shooting; the other was rushed to a nearby hospital in critical condition for surgery and survived.

About an hour and 25 minutes after the Riverside shooting, at approximately 3:00 am, a man matching Dorner's description tried to steal a boat in San Diego, telling the boat's captain that he would take the boat to Mexico. A federal criminal complaint was filed against Dorner this same day for allegedly fleeing California to avoid prosecution.

Hours later, the burning remains of Dorner's vehicle, a dark gray 2005 Nissan Titan, were found on a remote fire trail by a local, Daniel McGowan, near Big Bear Lake, about 80 miles (130 km) from Los Angeles. Investigators spread out to search for Dorner in the surrounding area, and about 125 officers went from door to door. All schools in the Bear Valley Unified School District were placed into a state of lockdown.

Around this time Dorner occupied a cabin owned by a family named Reynolds.

=== February 9 ===
CNN reported that the LAPD was re-opening its investigation into Dorner's dismissal so as to reassure the public that the police were doing everything in their power to capture Dorner.

=== February 10 ===
Authorities offered a $1 million reward for information leading to the capture of Dorner. For the first time, his actions were described as a form of domestic terrorism. With Dorner believed to be hiding somewhere in the San Bernardino Mountains, an unmanned aerial vehicle was deployed to aid the search from the air during fears that he would head for the Mexican border. Later in the day, a Lowe's store in Northridge was evacuated based on reports of a possible sighting of Dorner.

=== February 11 ===
The Riverside District Attorney filed formal charges against Dorner for the murder of a police officer and the attempted murder of three other officers.

=== February 12 ===
Police raided a hotel in Tijuana, Mexico, based on a tip that Dorner was there. Authorities also discovered surveillance footage of Dorner purchasing scuba diving gear at a sporting goods store in Torrance. A message posted to the Twitter account of the San Bernardino County district attorney's office said:

The sheriff has asked all members of the press to stop tweeting immediately. It is hindering officer safety. #Dorner

The message was removed within a few hours.

Some time on the morning of 12 February the Reynoldses returned to their Big Bear Lake cabin, where Dorner had been holed up for five days. Dorner captured them and tied them up before stealing their vehicle, and moving to another nearby cabin. The Reynoldses quickly freed themselves and called the police.

==== Final mountain cabin standoff ====
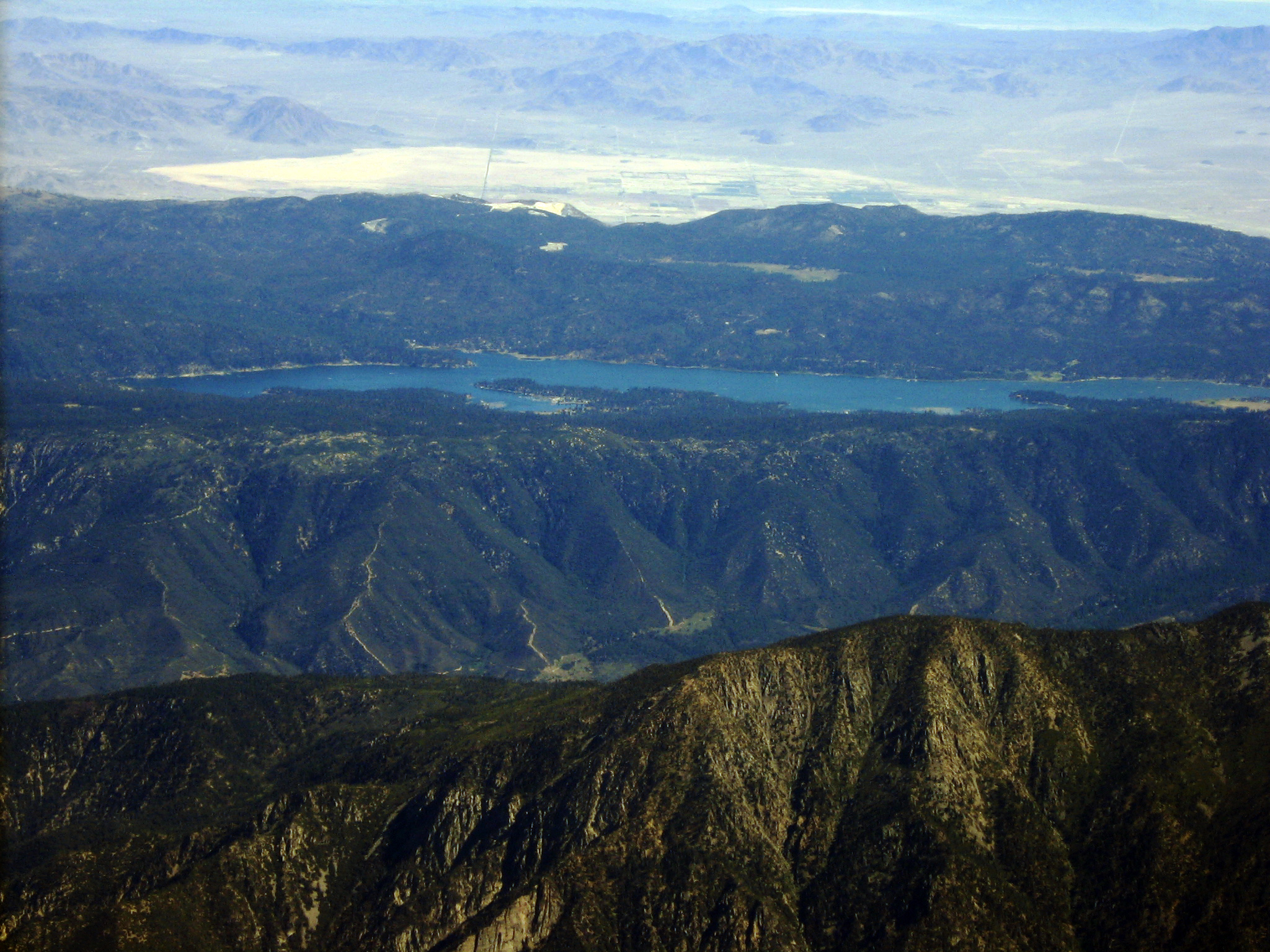
Aerial photograph of the San Bernardino Mountains near Big Bear Lake, California: the general location of the final standoff between Dorner and the San Bernardino County Sheriff's Department

On February 12, deputies of the San Bernardino County Sheriff's Department (SBSD) responded to a report of the carjacking of a white Dodge truck at 12:22 pm (PST) and began looking for the vehicle on the ground and from the air. The truck's driver had not been harmed. Fish and Wildlife officers were the first to spot the vehicle and recognized Dorner as the driver. Officers from numerous agencies chased Dorner to a cabin near Big Bear Lake.

Dorner opened fire on two SBSD officers, hitting both. The officers were airlifted to Loma Linda University Medical Center, where Detective Jeremiah MacKay was pronounced dead. The SBSD confirmed to the media that Dorner was barricaded in a cabin near the command center set up for the manhunt, in a mountainous rural area northeast of Angelus Oaks, and that the building was surrounded by law enforcement. The Times reported that there were possibly hostages in the cabin with Dorner. A three-mile (5 km) perimeter was set up around the cabin and residents were told to remain inside with their doors locked.

Police initially attempted to force Dorner out of the cabin by using tear gas and demanding his surrender over loudspeakers. When Dorner did not respond, police used a demolition vehicle to knock down most walls of the building. They then shot pyrotechnic tear gas canisters, nicknamed "burners", into the cabin, which resulted in the cabin catching fire. Shortly thereafter, a single gunshot was heard from the cabin. As the fire continued, ammunition was exploding from within the cabin, making it dangerous for officials to try to put out the fire. Law enforcement examiners differ on whether it was justified to use pyrotechnic devices to end the standoff instead of waiting for Dorner to come out.

In the evening of February 12, the LAPD and the SBSD denied reports that Dorner's body had been recovered from the burned cabin. In a press conference, LAPD commander Andrew Smith stated that no body had been removed from the site, adding that reports of a body being identified were untrue as the cabin area was "too hot to make entry".

=== Aftermath ===
On February 13, it was reported that human remains had been found in the search of the cabin's ruins. A wallet with a California driver's license with the name "Christopher Dorner" was also found in the rubble. That same day, San Bernardino County Sheriff John McMahon disputed rumors that deputies had intentionally burned down the cabin. It was also revealed that deputies had knocked on the door of the cabin earlier during the search for Dorner, but moved on when they received no answer.

On February 14, medical examiners confirmed during an autopsy, using dental records, that the charred body found in the burned-out cabin was in fact that of Dorner. The following day, the SBSD announced the autopsy showed Dorner died from a single self-inflicted gunshot wound to the head. At the same news conference, Sheriff John McMahon reiterated the claim that deputies had not deliberately set the cabin on fire. SBSD captain Gregg Herbert, who led the assault on the cabin, claimed that the canisters were a last resort, adding that the potential for fire was considered.

== Police shooting of unrelated civilians ==
In two separate incidents in the early morning hours of February 7, 2013, police fired on people who turned out to be unrelated to Dorner. Dorner was not present at either of the incidents.

At about 5:30 am (PST), at least seven LAPD officers on a protection detail of an unnamed LAPD official's residence in the 19500 block of Redbeam Street in Torrance opened fire on the back of a light blue Toyota Tacoma and shot its two occupants, Emma Hernandez (71) and her daughter, Margie Carranza (47) delivering newspapers for the Los Angeles Times. The vehicle, according to officers, was spotted exiting a freeway and heading to the area of the residence that officers were protecting, was thought by police to match the description of Dorner's Nissan Titan and was moving without its headlights on. Hernandez was shot in the back and Carranza received wounds to her hand. Their attorney claimed police "had no idea who was in that vehicle" when they opened fire, and that nothing about his clients or their vehicle matched the descriptions given of the suspect or his truck. The two women stated that they were given no warning before being fired upon. A neighbor said the truck was used every day to deliver newspapers, and the women who used it kept their headlights off so as to not wake people up. The two women were injured, but both survived. The LAPD started an internal investigation into the shooting. According to their attorney Glen Jonas, 102 bullet holes were found in the truck. The LAPD declined to confirm the total number of officers involved or how many bullets were fired or if any verbal warnings were given to the women before the shooting began.

Approximately 25 minutes after that incident, officers from the Torrance Police Department (TPD) opened fire on and struck another vehicle. Like the first shooting, the incident involved a vehicle that police claimed resembled the description of Dorner's truck, but was later discovered to be a black Honda Ridgeline driven by David Perdue, a white male. A TPD police cruiser slammed into Perdue's pickup and officers opened fire. Perdue, who was on his way to the beach to surf, was not hit by any of the bullets, but reportedly suffered injuries as a result of the car impact. Police claim that Perdue's pickup truck "matched the description" of the one belonging to Dorner. However, the Times reported that the vehicle involved was once again a different make and color to that of the suspect's, and that Perdue "looks nothing like" the suspect.

=== Settlement paid ===
In April 2013 the LAPD paid a $4.2 million settlement to Margie Carranza and Emma Hernandez. The city of Torrance initially offered a $500,000 settlement to David Perdue, who rejected the offer. With the Perdue case set to go to trial in August 2014, the parties reached an agreement in July 2014 for a $1.8 million settlement.

=== Use-of-force policy violation ===
On February 4, 2014, LAPD chief Charlie Beck announced that eight officers had violated the LAPD's use-of-force policy and would be disciplined. Beck noted that California state law prevents him from disclosing the nature of the discipline publicly, but that discipline could range "from extensive retraining up to termination." Disciplinary actions for the officers involved did not include criminal charges.

== Reward ==
On February 10, 2013, Mayor Antonio Villaraigosa announced a $1 million reward for information leading to the capture of Dorner and, because the terms of the offer were not carefully stipulated, judges had to later decide how the reward would be divided. Ultimately the reward was divided four ways, with $800,000 going to James and Karen Reynolds, who were tied up by Dorner in their Big Bear Lake cabin before he stole their vehicle; $150,000 to Daniel McGowan; and $50,000 to R. L. McDaniel.

== Protests against the LAPD ==
There were online protests against the LAPD as well as a protest outside the department's headquarters on February 16, 2013. Protesters stated that they objected to the manner in which Dorner's dismissal was handled, the shooting of civilians by the LAPD during the manhunt, and the tactics used which resulted in the fire in the cabin in which Dorner was hiding.

== See also ==
- 2010 Northumbria Police manhunt
- 2016 shooting of Dallas police officers
- List of homicides in California
- Primorsky Partisans
- Manhunt for the perpetrators of the 2013 Boston Marathon bombing
