= Romy Monteiro =

Dutch singer, theater actress and television presenter

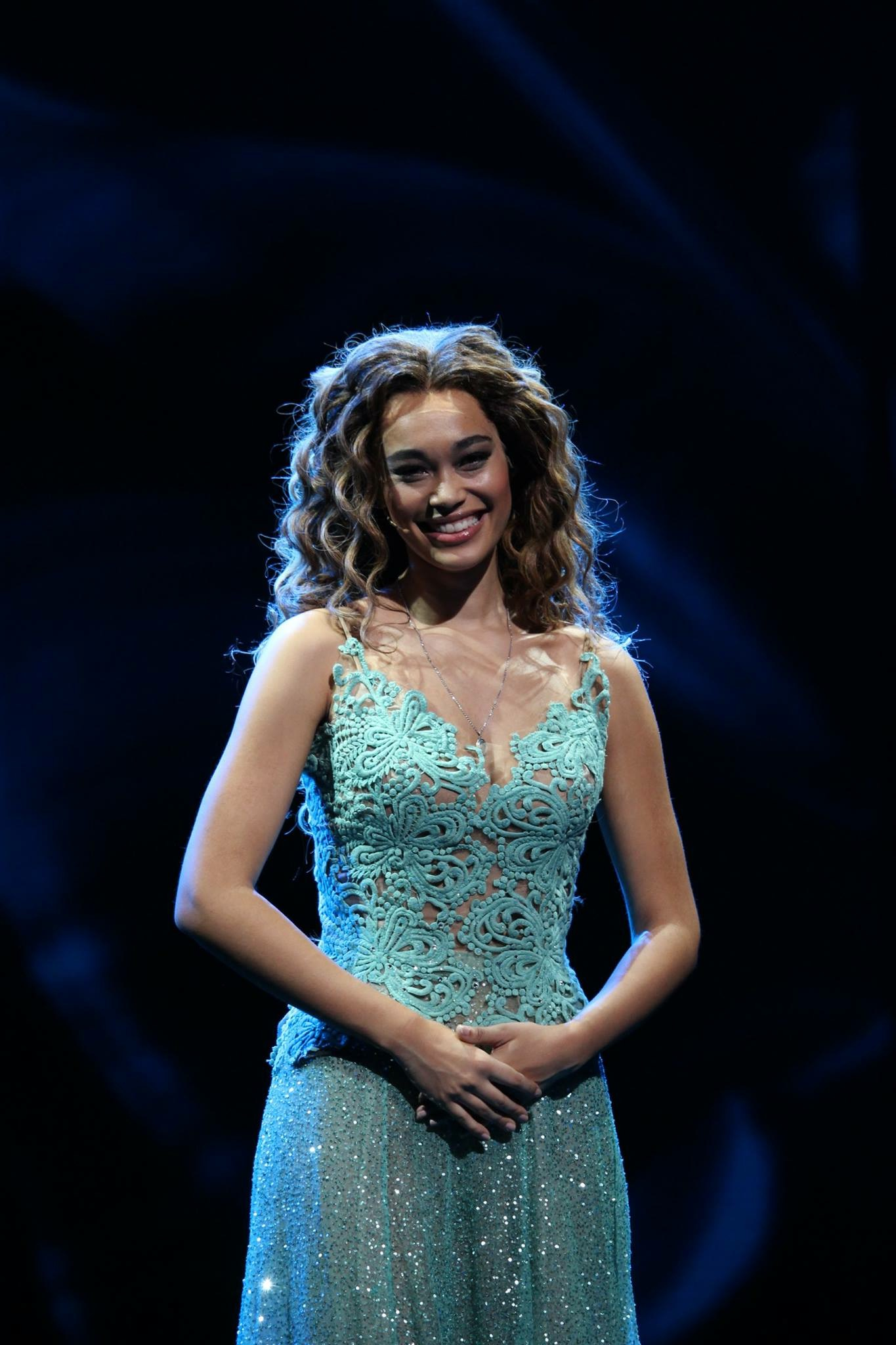
- Monteiro in 2016

Background information
- Born: Romy Truggelaar; 13 November 1992 (age 33); Utrecht, Netherlands
- Occupations: Singer, actress, television presenter
- Years active: 2014–present
- Presenting career
- Show: Mijn vader is de beste Junior Songfestival; DanceSing; De Hit Kwis
- Stations: AVROTROS; SBS6

Romy Truggelaar (Dutch pronunciation: [ˈroːmi ˈtrʏɣəlaːr]; born 13 November 1992), better known as Romy Monteiro (pronounced [ˈroːmi mɔnˈteːroː]), is a Dutch singer, actress and television presenter. After taking part in the singing competition The Voice of Holland in 2014, she was cast for the lead role in the Dutch musical The Bodyguard in 2015.

== Career ==
In 2014, Monteiro took part in the fifth season of The Voice of Holland. She advanced to the live shows with Trijntje Oosterhuis as her coach, but was eliminated in the quarter-finals. In September 2015, she made her acting debut in the musical The Bodyguard, in which she played the role of Rachel Marron. In 2016, she won the Musical Award for Upcoming Talent for her role in The Bodyguard.

In the same year, Monteiro participated in the talent show Dance Dance Dance with her mother Antje Monteiro. They were eliminated in the fourth episode. On 10 February 2017, Monteiro released her debut album "A Tribute to Whitney", containing covers of songs by Whitney Houston. This album reached number 1 in the Dutch Album Top 100.

In 2017, she presented the children's show Mijn vader is de beste for AVROTROS. Since 2017, she also presents the singing competition Junior Songfestival, which serves as the Dutch preselection for the Junior Eurovision Song Contest.

In 2018, she was a coach in the singing competition It Takes 2 on SBS6. In 2019, she co-presented the talent show DanceSing with Johnny de Mol, also on SBS6.

In 2020, Monteiro returned to the public broadcaster AVROTROS to present De Hit Kwis together with Kees Tol. She portrays the role of Indra Kalkhoven in the RTL 4 soap opera Goede tijden, slechte tijden.

On 22 May 2021, Monteiro announced the votes from the Dutch jury at the Eurovision Song Contest 2021, replacing Duncan Laurence who had tested positive for COVID-19 earlier that week.
