= The Baby Borrowers =

- Genre: Reality television
- Country of origin: United Kingdom
- Original language: English
- No. of series: 2
- No. of episodes: 8

Production
- Executive producer: Richard McKerrow
- Running time: 50 min
- Production company: Love Productions

Original release
- Network: BBC Three
- Release: 8 January – 19 January 2007

Related
- The Baby Borrowers (U.S.); Pati Patni Aur Woh

The Baby Borrowers is a British reality television series produced by Love Productions for BBC Three. The series premiered 8 January 2007. The show features five couples aged between 16 and 19. They start off attempting to look after a baby for three days, before moving onto toddlers, pre-teens, teenagers and finally an elderly person.

There were also two spin off shows; The Baby Borrowers: Compilation showing highlight moments from the previous week, and The Baby Borrowers: Friends and Family asking what the teenage couples dearest and nearest think.

== Criticism ==
Before being broadcast, the program received bad publicity as it was seen to be immoral to allow inexperienced teenagers to look after real babies. However, the BBC assured viewers that the parents of the babies had given consent, and that a nanny was on hand at all times to intervene if need be.

In actuality, when the show aired in the UK, few parents intervened even when their babies were extremely upset, and the nannies gave controversial advice, including letting babies "cry it out". One older baby was refused a clean nappy because he had been potty-trained before the show started.

== Episodes ==
=== Series 1 ===
No.	Original release date
1	8 January 2007
The teenage couples settle into their new homes and prepare for parenthood. They go on an afternoon training course and the females need to wear a two stone "empathy belly".
2	9 January 2007
The couples are all given a baby to look after. The day starts with the trainee parents dealing with rounds of constant crying, nappy changing, and feeding. The parents of the babies watch via monitors and some have to step in and warn the teenagers over their behaviour.
3	11 January 2007
For the final 48 hours of having their baby, one person from each couple returns to work, leaving a stay-at-home parent to care single-handedly for their baby. After having their baby taken away yesterday, Ava and Fisnik must prove they are fit to care for another youngster. Carl and Kayleigh have a real-life scare of their own as it appears Kayleigh could actually be pregnant, however it appears it is just a scare.
4	12 January 2007
The couples get toddlers to look after where one is in the middle of toilet training. The nannies have to interrupt due to poor care by the teenage couples. The weekend kicks off with a children's party, hosted by Kallai and Raiesa who are not talking to each other.
5	15 January 2007
The couples move on to looking after super-charged six- to eleven-year-olds. With no manual or nannies, the teens have to discover how to be a parent to a walking, talking child with attitude and opinions. Alex and Sam have two hell-raisers called Aiden and Connor to contend with. These hyperactive kids run them into the ground with their early starts and constant demands.
6	16 January 2007
The couples are given younger teenagers to look after for an entire weekend. Saturday night kicks off with a party and it is not long before the young teens are giving their new "parents" the run-around. Ryan and Lauren find their rose-tinted view of parenthood is challenged by Jack, a 13-year-old with cerebral palsy. It proves to be a taxing weekend where the couples learn that parenting does not necessarily get easier as the kids grow up.
7	18 January 2007
It is the final few days on Archer Close, and the teens are challenged by the arrival of five demanding Old Age Pensioner guests. Kallai and Raiesa's relationship reaches a breaking point – and with 82-year-old Margaret trying to play counsellor they are forced to confront the issues they have pushed aside for weeks. Meanwhile, Fisnik confides in pensioner Sheila and finally opens up about his brutal past.
8	19 January 2007
After four weeks of living together and surviving parenthood for the very first time, the experiment is drawing to an end. But have the teens learned anything? All five couples are revisited and discuss whether the experiment has had any effect on them.
