= The Academy (American TV series) =

- The Academy title card
- Country of origin: United States
- No. of seasons: 3

Production
- Running time: 60 minutes

Original release
- Network: Fox Reality Channel; MyNetworkTV
- Release: May 2007 – July 26, 2008

The Academy is a reality television series that provides a behind-the-scenes look at police recruits of the Los Angeles County Sheriff's Academy as they go through an 18-week training course to become deputies of the Los Angeles County Sheriff's Department. The program premiered in May 2007 on Fox Reality Channel with class 355. As of fall 2007, the series is also aired on MyNetworkTV. There were 111 recruits to start out and 24 were separated. Separations occur when recruits fail make-up exams, simply decide to resign due to injury or by personal choice, or when the instructors feel the recruit shouldn't continue with training.

The lead drill instructor was Deputy Miley a.k.a. "The Ramrod". Class 355 was mostly made of recruits for the Los Angeles County Sheriff's Department, but there were recruits for other agencies as well such as the Los Angeles Port Police, Torrance Police Department, Inglewood Police Department, Redondo Beach Police Department, and the Pomona Police Department. The finale for the first season was on Thursday, August 2, 2007.

Fox Reality started taping the second season of the show in early November 2007 at the STARS Center, the Los Angeles County Sheriff academy. The second-season premiere aired on May 24, 2008, and the second-season finale aired on July 26, 2008. The third season of The Academy, which premiered on October 24, 2009, provides a behind-the-scenes look at recruits of the Orange County Fire Authority, California.

== Drill instructors ==
- Sgt. Mark Wilkins – Los Angeles County Sheriff's Department
- Dep. Dwight Miley – Los Angeles County Sheriff's Department, Industry Station – "The Ramrod".

Deputy Dwight Miley holds the Los Angeles County Sheriff's Department Medal of Valor, the highest honor of the Department, which was awarded June 21, 2000, "in consequence of your heroic actions on April 12, 1998, when you unselfishly placed yourself in immediate danger to save the lives of fellow deputies." Miley won this in association with six other deputies after Sgt. Dean Scoville was shot responding to a domestic dispute.

- Dep. Rene Garcia – Los Angeles County Sheriff's Department, Norwalk Station
- Dep. Ray Jones – Los Angeles County Sheriff's Department, Carson Station
- Dep. Sidra Sherrod – Los Angeles County Sheriff's Department, Lennox Station
- Dep. Pete Enciso – Los Angeles County Sheriff's Department, East Los Angeles Station
- Ofcr. Jeremiah Hart – Torrance Police Department – Season 1
- Ofcr. Ryan Peterson – Torrance Police Department – Season 2

=== Season 3 (Orange County Fire Class 36) ===
Class 36 consists of recruits from various backgrounds, including EMTs, firefighters from other cities, a construction manager, dispatchers, a corporate vice president, and a former professional football player. The class started out with 28 recruits (the top one percent of all applicants). Through the entire 18-week program, four were released:

- Lefebvre (week 9): Failed remedial Mid-Term test, but still active with Orange County Fire Authority as a dispatcher
- Adelman (week 11): Failed remedial test
- Westphal (week 14): Repeated failure to follow directions and numerous safety concerns
- Kermott (week 17): Failed remedial Final test
