= Toni Jeričević =

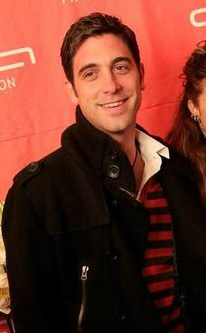
- Born: Toni Jeričević; July 17, 1983 (age 42); Zadar, SR Croatia, SFR Yugoslavia
- Occupations: Businessman, Actor, TV host, Real Estate agent
- Years active: 2006–present

Toni Jeričević (born July 17, 1983) is a businessman turned actor and TV host who appeared in American and Croatian theatre plays, commercials and national television productions. He is best known as the TV host of the prime time reality sports TV show My Dad Is Better Than Your Dad which was originally produced by Mark Burnett for the U.S. broadcasting network NBC and later franchised to the Croatian broadcasting television station Nova TV. He lived in China and worked for The Walt Disney Company. He currently works in the real estate industry.

== Early life ==
He graduated from Ord High School in Ord, Nebraska, earning an athletic and academic scholarship for the Midwestern private Midland University (previously Midland Lutheran College). Jeričević graduated summa cum laude with a Bachelor's degree in Marketing and Management among top 20 students overall, also earning a Wall Street Journal Student Achievement Award.

== Career ==
In 2007 Jeričević left his business position to live and work in Budapest, Hungary to become a TV host of the national phone-in television game show Nova Lova for Nova TV. After that, he was invited to audition for the reality show My Dad Is Better Than Your Dad and got the part of leading TV host. During that time Jeričević appeared in a theatre play Tablica Dijeljenja directed by Ivan Leo Lemo in the INK, going back to hosting phone-in game shows until the beginning of 2010.

In 2012 Jeričević was cast as the main villain in the short movie Unexpected Delivery. He also appeared as the criminal inspector in the Croatian television series Ruža Vjetrova.

== Theatre ==
- The Milan Tarot Show (2013), cabaret
- All In The Timing (2011/02), comedy
- Master Class of Maria Callas (2001/02), drama
- Rhinoceros (2002/03), drama
- You Can't Take It with You (2003/04), comedy
- It's Just A Play (2004/05), comedy
- One Thousand and One Nights (2006/07), drama
- The Liar (2007), comedy
- The Fish Tales (2007), comedy
- The Division Table (2008/09), children play

== Television ==
- Glazbena Prskalica (2013), Mreža TV
- Najbrzi Igrac (2012), OBN
- Ruža Vjetrova (2012), RTL
- My Dad Is Better Than Your Dad (2008), NovaTV
- Nova Lova (host, 2007–2009), NovaTV
- Bitange i princeze (2005), episode #39, HRT2
- Pazi zid (2008)
- MOL reklam (2009)
- Fear Factor (2007)

== Film ==
- Unexpected Delivery (2012), Your Film Festival
