= Amnesia (game show) =

- Logo
- Also known as: Amne$ia
- Created by: Mark Burnett
- Presented by: Dennis Miller
- Country of origin: United States
- No. of episodes: 8

Production
- Running time: 60 minutes
- Production companies: Mark Burnett Productions; Super Delicious

Original release
- Network: NBC
- Release: February 22 – April 11, 2008

Amnesia (stylized as Amne$ia) is an American television game show that aired on Fridays at 8:00 PM ET on NBC, after debuting on February 22, 2008, at 9:00 PM ET after 1 vs. 100. Contestants win money by answering questions about their own lives. The program was produced by Mark Burnett, producer of other shows like Survivor, The Apprentice, and Are You Smarter than a 5th Grader?, and was hosted by comedian Dennis Miller. Contestants were able to win up to $250,000.

== Gameplay ==
The game was played in five rounds:

=== Round 1: You in 60 Seconds ===
Instead of standard welcome intros, Amnesia began with a speed round. The contestant had 60 seconds to answer seven questions, winning $1,000 for each correct answer, for a maximum of $7,000. There was no penalty for wrong answers, and the money won in this round was the contestant's to keep.

=== Rounds 2–4 ===
Round	Questions	Value	Maximum total
2	3	$5,000	$15,000
3	2	$10,000	$20,000
4	2	$20,000	$40,000
Maximum possible total			$75,000

In the next three rounds, the contestant was sent to a soundproof booth and a loved one was asked about various events they have shared with the player. The contestant then returned and was asked questions. Occasionally, in lieu of a question, the contestant had to complete a stunt to be credited with a correct answer (such as trying to place the names of five obscure body parts on a dummy within 30 seconds); a frequent stunt was a blindfolded taste test of a familiar family recipe, with three imitation dishes. A total of seven questions were played throughout those rounds, and the maximum possible total was $75,000.

=== Round 5: Total Amnesia ===
Question	Value
1	$25,000
2	$50,000
3	$100,000

Risk was a factor in this round, so the player was given the option to stop or proceed before each question in this round.

If they chose to proceed, a question was chosen by picking one of their supporters, each holding an envelope that contained a question about their relationship. The contestant did not need to have the full value of a question in their bank in order to attempt it (e.g., a player with $5,000 was still allowed to play the $100,000 question).

A right answer to a question in that round added money to the player's bank, but a wrong answer subtracted that amount. Before each question, the player had the option to stop and take the money already won, but if at any time the bank fell to $0, the game ended, and the player left with whatever they earned in round 1.

If the player correctly answered all 10 questions in the main game, they won a maximum total of $250,000.

== U.S. standard ratings ==
The ratings for Amnesia were as follows while competing for another game show My Dad Is Better than Your Dad.

#	Air Date	Timeslot	Rating	Share	18–49	Viewers	Weekly Rank
1	February 22, 2008	9:00 P.M.	4.6	8	2.4/7	7.44	TBA
2	February 29, 2008	8:00 P.M.	3.4	6	1.3/4	5.10	TBA
3	March 7, 2008	8:00 P.M.	3.4	6	1.4/5	4.73	75
4	March 14, 2008	8:00 P.M.	3.2	6	1.4/5	4.81	76
5	March 21, 2008	8:00 P.M.	3.5	7	1.3/5	5.15	64
6	March 28, 2008	8:00 P.M.	3.5	7	1.3/5	5.02	69
7	April 4, 2008	8:00 P.M.	3.0	6	1.3/4	4.51	73
8	April 11, 2008	8:00 P.M.	2.8	5	1.0/4	4.06	79

== International versions ==
Country	Name	Presenter	Channel	Date of transmission
Australia	Amnesia	?	Nine Network	2008
Brazil	Você Se Lembra?	Joe Americo	SBT	July 6, 2009 – February 22, 2010
United Kingdom (pilot)	Amnesia	Terry Wogan	Channel 4	Unknown

== See also ==
- Opportunity Knocks
