= The Baby Borrowers (American TV series) =

- Created by: Ashley Potterton; Richard McKerrow
- Starring: Various
- Narrated by: Craig Zimmerman
- Country of origin: United States
- Original language: English
- No. of seasons: 1
- No. of episodes: 6

Production
- Executive producers: Richard McKerrow; Tom Shelly; Kevin Harris
- Running time: 60 minutes
- Production company: Love Productions

Original release
- Network: NBC
- Release: June 25 – August 6, 2008

Related
- The Baby Borrowers (UK)

The Baby Borrowers is an American version of The Baby Borrowers reality television show based on the British television series of the same name originally aired in 2007. The show features five couples aged between 18 and 20 who either believe that being parents is easy, or are divided upon the issue. They start off attempting to look after a baby for three days, before moving onto toddlers, pre-teens, teenagers and finally an elderly person.

The show is produced by Love Productions, the same company that produces the original British version.

On March 13, 2009, it was confirmed that the series had been canceled and would not be returning for a second season.

== Format ==
Each week a teenage couple aged 18–20 will set up a home and become parents beginning with a baby, then a toddler, pre-teens, teenagers, and finally elderly adults over the course of one month. The couples will participate in pre-natal classes prior to the arrival of the baby, every three days the couples will advance to the next stage. Some couples may have an only child while some may have the responsibility of taking care of siblings. There are no eliminations or prizes (with the exception of experience).

Married couples volunteered to participate in the experiment by letting the teenage couple "borrow" their child. They would deliver the child to their home, offer advice about how to respond in certain situations and gave a manual with instructions (e.g. child likes/dislikes, favorite food or toys, when to feed them, etc.) The couples cared for the child (or children) away from their parents for 3 days. The parents stayed across the street in a home and were able to monitor their child and the couple on surveillance video that was set up all around the home. If at any time they felt they were needed or wanted to help, they were able to step in. A professional nanny also stayed with the couple and their child and monitored them. The nanny was only allowed to "shadow" to ensure the safety of the child and could only come forth in the event of an emergency. Once the age turned to the teenagers, there was no more parent or nanny monitoring.

== Season 1 ==
The Baby Borrowers was first announced on March 12, 2007 as a mid-season replacement with a six episode commitment. Originally the show was scheduled to air on Monday nights at 8:00 PM ET/PT beginning February 18, 2008 but on January 28, 2008 NBC announced The Baby Borrowers would be pushed back and aired at a later date. On March 5, 2008 NBC announced The Baby Borrowers would air on Wednesday nights at 8:00 PM ET/PT beginning June 25, 2008 as part of the network's All-American Summer. The Show also airs on Women's Entertainment Channel on Thursdays at 9 pm central.

=== Substitute parents ===
Parents, their hometown, and their age at time of filming:

Girl/Boy
Name	Hometown	Age	Name	Hometown	Age
Jordan Cameron	Katy, Texas	18	Sasha Anderson	Easton, Texas	18
Daton Morris	San Diego, California	19	Morgan Mitchell*	San Diego, California	18
Austin Trizzino	Dunwoody, Georgia	18	Kelly Young	Dunwoody, Georgia	18
Alicea Davis	Houston, Texas	18	Cory Davila	Houston, Texas	20
Kelsey Lampman	Kensington, New Hampshire	18	Sean Graham	Seabrook, New Hampshire	18

- On episode 5, Daton left the house; leaving Morgan a "single mom".

=== After the show ===
The season 1 finale aired on July 30, 2008 and at the end of the show gave an update to the status and whereabouts of each teen couple.

- Austin & Kelly - "Kelly is now a second year MBA student at Auburn University in Alabama. She is currently engaged. Austin now works in Atlanta. They are together still."
- Alicea & Cory - "Alicea is attending Cy-Fair College in Cypress, TX. She wants to become a make-up artist. Cory is majoring in Business at Texas State University. Cory and Alicea still see each other."
- Kelsey & Sean - "Kelsey and Sean had decided to go their separate ways."
- Jordan & Sasha - "Sasha is studying to become a pharmacist. Jordan is studying to become an airline pilot. Despite becoming closer during the experiment, they have since questioned their relationship but are still together."
- Daton & Morgan - "After the experiment, Daton and Morgan gave their relationship another try.

The day after the show aired, it replayed on the WE Channel and had different information during the credits about the status of some of the couples.

- Austin & Kelly - "Kelly is now a sophomore at Auburn University in Alabama. Austin is a freshman at the same university. Despite their problems they are still together."
- Alicea & Cory - "Alicea and Cory are trying to make their relationship work and got back together."
- Daton & Morgan - "After walking out on Morgan during the experiment, Daton began calling Morgan. They are determined to make their relationship work."

The update also indicated both times that all the teens said none of them have plans to become parents any time soon.

=== Production note ===
The season 1 finale was dedicated to the memory of Reggie. Her husband, George, participated in the show during the "elderly phase" and was looked after by Sasha and Jordan. She died after the filming of the program.

=== Film location ===
- Eagle, Idaho

== Criticism ==
The Natural Child Project, a child advocacy group, expressed concern regarding the premise of the television show. In a letter sent by The Natural Child Project to NBC, the group expresses concern mainly over the emotional health of the babies and young children involved in the show. The letter goes on to mention that babies that lose their primary caregiver can go into mourning, emotional depression and have no way to know that they will be returned to their natural family. The letter also refers to the criticism over the original British version.

Additionally, the American Academy of Child and Adolescent Psychiatry made a formal request on July 2, 2008 to NBC to pull the show. The AACAP stated that "Separating babies and toddlers from their parents for extended periods of time can lead children to feel distress and anxiety. After prolonged separation, a child can feel distrust for his or her primary caregiver. Separation can damage a healthy attachment and a child's sense of safety." The president of the AACAP, Dr. Robert Hendren, stated "A child's sense of security should not be gambled with... a more constructive approach would have had the teenagers shadow a family of a toddler or baby, keeping parents close."

On July 7, NBC took the unusual step of setting up an online forum where parents who allowed their infants to be on the show could defend themselves against critics.
