= Secret Talents of the Stars =

- Genre: Reality competition
- Directed by: Don Weiner
- Presented by: John O'Hurley
- Judges: Debbie Reynolds; Brian McKnight; Gavin Polone
- Country of origin: United States
- No. of seasons: 1
- No. of episodes: 1

Production
- Executive producers: Robyn Nash; Don Weiner
- Running time: 48 mins.
- Production companies: Magic Molehill Productions; Robyn Nash Productions; Don Weiner Productions

Original release
- Network: CBS
- Release: April 8, 2008

Secret Talents of the Stars is an American interactive reality game show where celebrities competed against each other in a tournament-like format in areas that differed from their normal professions, like singing, dancing, and acrobatics. Viewers were to vote on the most talented celebrity. The show premiered on CBS on April 8, 2008, but was canceled the following day due to low ratings, making it one of the few series to be canceled after one episode.

== Format ==
While the contestants' performances were critiqued by the show's judging panel of actress Debbie Reynolds, singer Brian McKnight, and producer/agent Gavin Polone, the real judging was done by home viewers, who were to vote online during each episode to determine which two celebrities stayed in the competition and which two were sent home. Voting was open only during the initial live broadcast to the Eastern and Central time zones as the results were to be announced at the end of each episode.

Secret Talents of the Stars was to follow a seven-week, tournament-style broadcast format.

Four acts were to each perform during both the show's live broadcasts on April 8 and 15, with home viewer votes determining two semi-finalists from each of those episodes. Those four semi-finalists would then have performed during a live broadcast on April 22, after which home viewer votes would determine the show's first two finalists.

Four more acts were to each perform during both the show's live broadcasts on April 29 and May 6, with home viewer votes determining two semi-finalists from each of those episodes. Those four semi-finalists would have then performed during a live broadcast on May 13, after which home viewer votes would determine the show's second two finalists.

The live finale broadcast would have aired on May 22, with all sixteen contestants appearing together, and the four finalists competing one last time for home viewers—who would have been able to vote during the broadcast. The winner would be revealed at the finale's conclusion and then perform the winning entry one last time. But because of the show's cancellation, there were, of course, no results or winner.

CBS ordered Secret Talents of the Stars in January. The show was produced by Magic Molehill Productions, Inc., in association with Robyn Nash Productions and Don Weiner Productions. Robyn Nash and Don Weiner served as executive producers.

== Contestants ==
Participants in the show, as well as the "secret talents" they would be performing, include:

Celebrity	Occupation	Secret Talent
Clint Black	country singer-songwriter	performing comedy
Danny Bonaduce	former child actor	maneuvering a unicycle with members of the Ringling Bros. and Barnum & Bailey Circus
Sasha Cohen	Olympic figure skater	performing with the New Shanghai Circus, a Chinese acrobat troupe
Ric Flair	former professional wrestler	salsa dancing
Joe Frazier	former professional boxer	singing R&B
Roy Jones Jr.	professional boxer	rapping
Marla Maples	ex-wife of Donald Trump and co-host of The Ex-Wives Club	doing a gymnastics routine with The Anti-Gravity Troupe
Cindy Margolis	actress and model	performing magic
Bridget Marquardt	actress and model	performing trapeze with the former masters of Cirque du Soleil
Jo Dee Messina	country singer-songwriter	performing a hip-hop meets step-dancing routine
Joshua Morrow	The Young and the Restless actor	performing a rock-n-roll juggling routine with Marcus Monroe
Mýa	actress and singer	tap dancing
Sheila E.	musician and former judge on The Next Great American Band	juggling with The Flying Karamazov Brothers
Ben Stein	comedian, attorney and commentator	dancing the jitterbug
George Takei	former Star Trek actor	crooning as a country singer
Malcolm-Jamal Warner	former Cosby Show actor	performing an original song on bass guitar as part of a hip hop orchestra

== Episode ==
During the single April 8, 2008, episode, the judges uniformly expressed their preference for the performances of Mýa and Clint Black. However, the audience votes advanced Sasha Cohen and Clint Black while sending Mýa and George Takei home.

After Takei performed, Polone joked that he looked like one of the main characters in Brokeback Mountain, the Oscar-nominated film about two gay cowboys. Takei, who is openly gay, mustered a smile during the live broadcast, but in a later interview with Entertainment Tonight, he admitted to being offended. Polone did not apologize for his words.

== Ratings ==
#	Air Date	Rating	Share	18–49	Viewers (m)	Weekly Rank
1	April 8, 2008	3.2	5	1.5/4	4.61	71

In comparison, the notorious flop Quarterlife, which had also been canceled after one episode by NBC several weeks earlier, had a 3.1 rating in the 10 p.m. time slot, where fewer networks broadcast. CBS then decided not to make the remaining six episodes.
