= Torrance Police Department =

Law enforcement agency serving Torrance, California

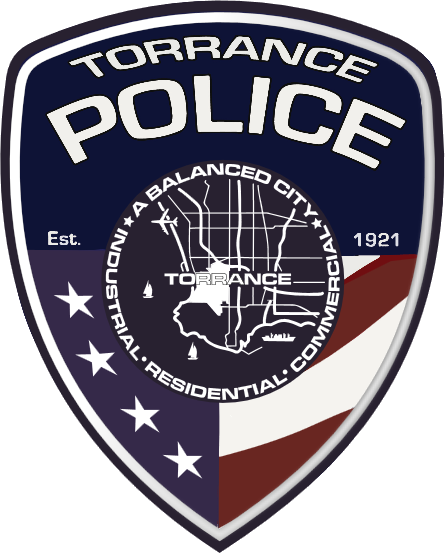
- Patch of the Torrance Police Department

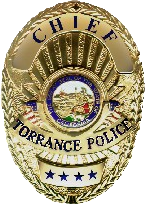
- Badge of the TPD's chief
- Common name: Torrance Police
- Abbreviation: TPD

Agency overview
- Employees: 246

Jurisdictional structure
- Operations jurisdiction: Torrance, California, U.S.
- jurisdiction of Torrance Police Department
- Area: 20.553 sq mi (53.233 km2)
- Population: 147,027
- Legal jurisdiction: Torrance, California
- General nature: Local civilian police

Operational structure
- Headquarters: 3300 Civic Center Drive Torrance, California 90503
- Officers: 219
- Civilians: 140
- Agency executive: Jay Hart, Chief of Police

Website
- Official website

The Torrance Police Department is the police department serving Torrance, California.

The department employs 219 sworn officers and 140 civilians. The department is the largest law enforcement agency in South Bay, and is one of the largest police departments in Los Angeles County.

Since June 2021, the Chief of Police has been Jay Hart.

== Overview ==
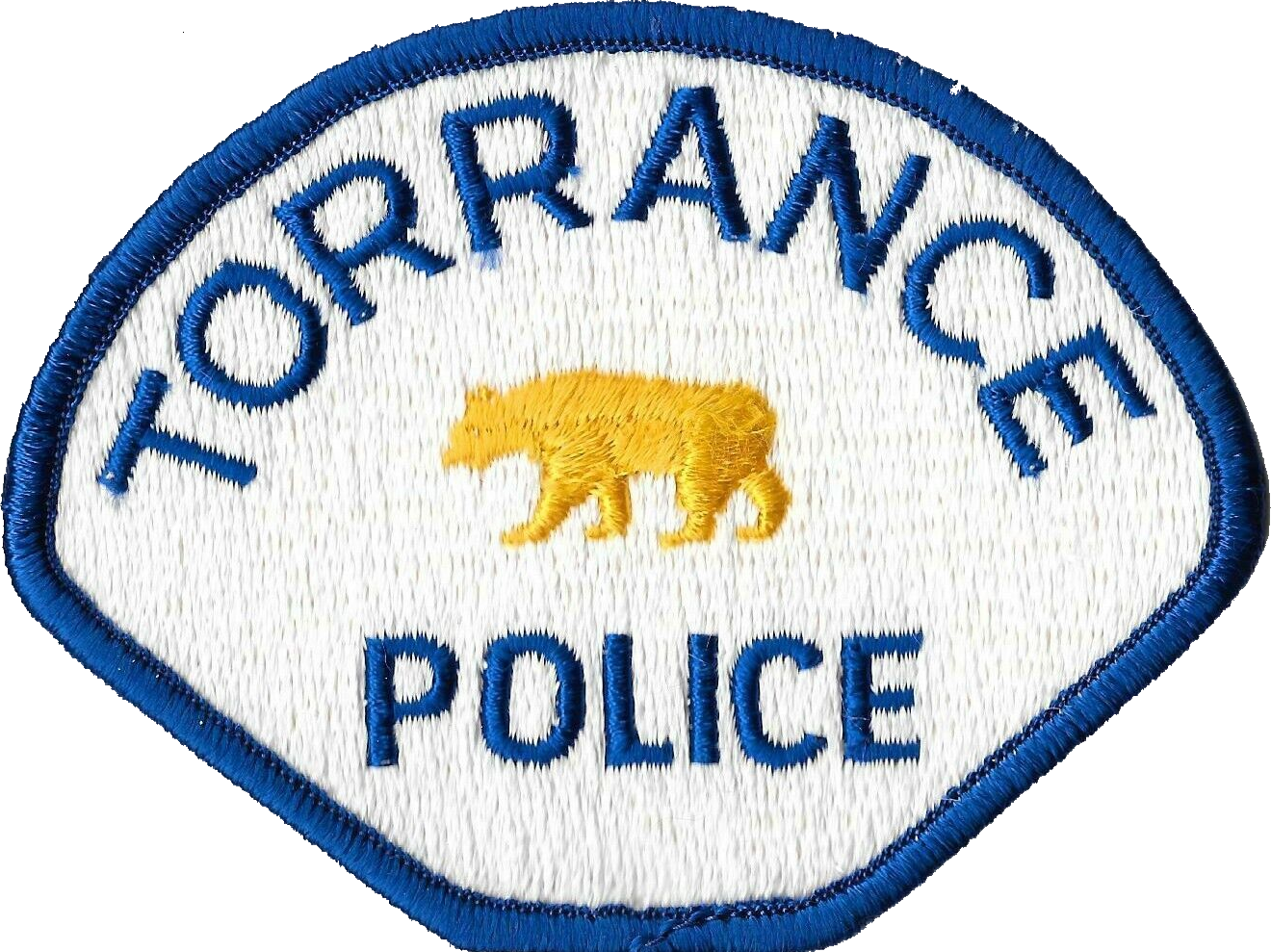
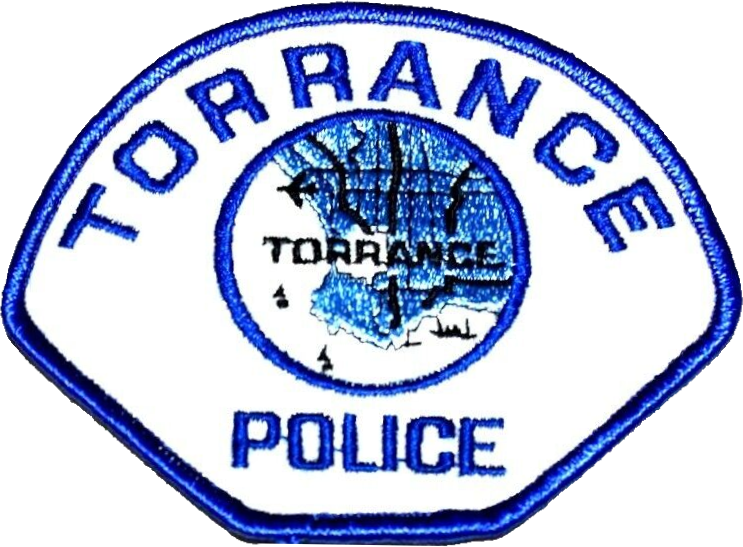
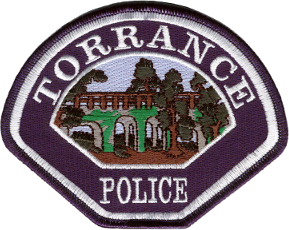
Former TPD patches

The Torrance Police Department has jurisdiction in the city limits of Torrance. Other sections with a "Torrance, CA" address are served by either the Los Angeles Police Department (the Harbor Gateway area east of Western Avenue) or the Los Angeles County Sheriff's Department in an unincorporated area adjacent to the Harbor Freeway with the ZIP code of 90502. Both areas are easily identified by their Los Angeles County-styled street signage. The department patrols an approximate one mile (1.6 km) area of Torrance Beach.

Officers carry the Glock 21 .45 Auto as the primary sidearm and the holster of choice is made and produced by Safariland.

=== Bureaus/Units ===
- Administrative Bureau; consisting of the Personnel, Research & Training and Records Divisions
- Support Services Bureau; consisting of the Communications and Services Divisions
- Patrol Bureau; consisting of the Patrol and Community Affairs Divisions
- Special Operations Bureau; consisting of the Special Investigations and Detective Divisions
- Special Units include; Robbery/Homicide, Cold Case Homicide, SWAT, Crisis Negotiation Team (CNT), K-9, Motors, School Resource Officer (SRO), Community Lead Officer (CLO), etc...

== Controversy ==
=== 2013 Southern California shootings ===
During the massive multi-agency manhunt for Christopher Jordan Dorner, the prime suspect in the 2013 Southern California shootings, in two separate incidents in the early morning hours of February 7, 2013, police shot at people unrelated to Dorner. Dorner was not present at either incident. Officers of the Torrance Police Department initiated the shooting in the second of these two cases.

Torrance police officers first rammed the truck with their car, then opened fire. The vehicle was being driven by David Perdue who was on his way to the beach for some early morning surfing before work. Police claim that Perdue's pickup truck "matched the description" of the one belonging to Dorner. However, the Los Angeles Times reports that "the pickups were different makes and colors ... Perdue looks nothing like Dorner: He's several inches shorter and about a hundred pounds lighter ... Perdue is white; Dorner is black."

Six months after the assault, the police paid Perdue $20,000 for the damage to his truck. The city has offered Perdue a half million dollars to settle the case, but he insists on almost four million dollars. As of August 2013, the city has not allowed outside investigators to see the truck.

In contrast, the Los Angeles Police Department paid two women who were attacked a sum of $4.2 million in damages without going to court.

=== Texting scandal ===
In 2021, an investigation into the Torrance Police Department found that at least 18 current and former police officers and recruits were involved in an exchange of racist and homophobic texts that promoted violence and police brutality against various people, including those who were Black, Jewish, or LGBTQ. According to the Los Angeles Times, the officers connected to the texting scandal were involved in at least seven use of force incidents since 2013, of which three resulted in the death of a Black or Latino person. Anthony Chavez and Matthew Concannon, two officers involved in the scandal, were initially cleared of any wrongdoing by Los Angeles County District Attorney Jackie Lacey for the 2018 fatal shooting of Christopher DeAndre Mitchell, a Black man who was holding an air rifle at the time of the shooting. Upon taking office in 2020, Lacey's successor, George Gascón, reopened the case against Chavez and Concannon. By April 13, 2023, the two officers were indicted for the shooting.

Two more officers involved in the scandal, Corey Weston and Christopher Tomsic, were fired by the department and charged by the district attorney's office in 2020 for their part in a vandalism of a Jewish suspect's car. Kiley Swaine and two of his friends were arrested by Weston and Tomsic in January 2020 for suspected mail theft. After being released, Swaine retrieved his car at a tow yard, finding it trashed with cereal and protein powder and a swastika spray-painted on one of the back seats. In March 2023, Swaine won a $750,000 settlement in a lawsuit against the City of Torrance and the two officers.

== In popular culture ==
In the 2015 film Straight Outta Compton, members of the Torrance Police Department harass members of N.W.A.

== See also ==
- Law enforcement in Los Angeles County
- List of law enforcement agencies in California
