= My Dad Is Better than Your Dad =

Reality sports television series

- Created by: Mark Burnett
- Presented by: Dan Cortese
- Country of origin: United States
- No. of seasons: 1
- No. of episodes: 8

Production
- Running time: 60 minutes

Original release
- Network: NBC
- Release: February 18 – April 7, 2008

My Dad Is Better than Your Dad is a reality sports television show on NBC that premiered on February 18, 2008. The show was produced by Mark Burnett, producer of other shows like Survivor, The Apprentice, and Are You Smarter than a 5th Grader, and was hosted by actor Dan Cortese. Four teams of children and their fathers competed in each episode, with the winning team having the chance to win up to $50,000.

The series was cancelled on April 2, 2008, after NBC announced its 2008–2009 schedule.

== Gameplay ==
Four fathers, paired up with their kids, compete in each episode, playing in stunts and answering questions, in what may have been a cross between Double Dare and American Gladiators.

Round 1—My Dad Is Faster
All four teams participate in a stunt that tests how fast Dad is. For example, on the first episode, the fathers had two minutes to destroy desks, and putting each piece of their desk into a bin to determine the weight. The team who has scored the least in that round is given a 15-second penalty carried into the next round.

Round 2—My Dad Is Stronger
This tests how strong the dads really are. For example, in most episodes, they have to swing their kids into an oversized dartboard, with their kids carrying large foam darts with sticky pads on the bottom (they only counted if the darts were simply put on the board, throwing them didn't count, and if a dart fell off, it still counted [note: As of the third episode, throwing a dart now counts, and a dart falling off doesn't count]). The team that scores the least in the round is eliminated and sent to "The Garage", but they leave with an Xbox 360 as a consolation prize.

Round 3—My Dad Is Smarter
Another test—this time to determine how smart Dad is. A question and four choices appear on a video screen to their left. The child rings in, but it's the dad who has to answer. A right answer earns 1 point, but a wrong answer causes the other teams to have the chance to answer from the remaining choices. The first two teams to score 3 points move on to the final round, while the losers get sent to the Garage with the Xbox 360.

Final Round—My Dad Is Braver
For the final round, this tests how brave Dad is. An example from the first episode is when each father had two minutes to score points by shooting newspapers from an air gun through windows worth 100 and 500 points. The opponent has to dodge the windows and make sure the newspaper doesn't break them. The winning team goes to the bonus round to play for $50,000 (and it all depends on how well a dad knows his son/daughter) while the losers get the Xbox 360.

Bonus Round—My Dad Knows Me Better
Before the round begins, the winning team earns a mountain bike and the Xbox 360 no matter what happens in the game. In the bonus round, similar to another NBC game show Amne$ia, the father was asked up to six questions about his child, earning his team $10,000 for each right answer. Unlike most primetime game shows of this era (not counting another NBC show, The Singing Bee), a wrong answer does not take away money. The round ends when the team hit $50,000 or two wrong answers have been given. During the show's run, no one walked away with the full $50,000. The most ever won was $40,000. Also, not one team has failed to answer any question correctly, thus winning no money.

== Winners ==
- Mark and Jim Fier (defeated Teams Kirby, Rutherford, and Kang)
- Leo and Christopher Li (defeated Teams Sass, Kabat, and Stephenson)
- Rick and Dustin Avila (defeated teams Grayston, Martin, and Basile)
- Dave and Mickey Cortez (Philippines version at GMA 7 hosted by Paolo Contis episode 11 defeated teams Carbungco, Salas, Gonzales)

== Replacement ==
During the third episode's first-round stunt, "Uphill Battle" (in which dads had three minutes to push as many balls up a hill into giant holes), contestant Al Gaines had a very strong lead over his opponents at the start, but towards the end, he ended up struggling to get more balls down the holes, even at the urging of his son. At the end of the round, it was quite apparent that Gaines was suffering from a heart attack, as teaser trailers show him being rushed from the Sony studios to an ambulance. According to the rules, if a father or child is unable to compete, a replacement family takes their place. The replacement family was the Gavero Family.

== International versions ==
Country	Local name	Host	Network	Date premiered
Brazil	Meu Pai é Melhor que Seu Pai	Celso Portiolli	SBT	April 18, 2010
China	老爸拼吧; Lao ba pin ba	Lóng Fēng	Xiamen Star	June 1, 2013
Croatia	Moj tata je bolji od tvog tate	Toni Jeričević	Nova TV	August 23, 2008
Ecuador	Mi Papa es el Mejor	Roberto Angelelli	Ecuavisa	2012
Egypt	الفائز أبى; El Faez abi	Mohammad El Qusi	Channel 1	September, 2009
Finland	Meidän isä on parempi kuin teidän isä	Ville Klinga	Nelonen	2008
Kazakhstan; Russia	Мой папа круче! Moy papa kruche!	Mikhail Porechenkov	Channel 7 STS	March 17, 2016; May 1, 2016
Netherlands	Mijn Vader is de Beste	Yolanthe Sneijder-Cabau; Monique Smit; Romy Monteiro	TROS	2010
Panama	Mi Papá es mejor que Tu Papá	Miguel Esteban	TVN	September 11, 2011
Philippines	My Dad is Better Than Your Dad	Paolo Contis	GMA Network	February 8, 2009
Sweden	Min pappa är bättre än din pappa	Adam Alsing	TV3	May 9, 2012
