= Masters of Illusion (TV series) =

American television magic show

- Genre: Stage magic
- Presented by: Dean Cain
- Country of origin: United States
- Original language: English
- No. of seasons: 14
- No. of episodes: 194 (and 1 special)

Production
- Executive producers: David McKenzie; David Martin; Gay Blackstone
- Production location: Hollywood, California
- Production company: Associated Television International

Original release
- Network: Pax TV (2000–01); MyNetworkTV (2009); First-run syndication (2012); The CW (2014–present)
- Release: October 2, 2000 – present

Related
- Masters of Illusion: Impossible Magic

Masters of Illusion is an American television series featuring performances by magicians. The first season, featuring illusionists on the grand stage at the Magic Castle in Hollywood, California, was broadcast on Pax TV from 2000 to 2001. MyNetworkTV aired a second season in 2009. In 2012, four syndicated episodes were broadcast. The series was revived by The CW in 2014, with Dean Cain as host. Since then, The CW has continued to renew the show, ordering a twelfth season on January 20, 2022, and a thirteenth season on May 18, 2023.

The fourteenth season premiered on January 24, 2025.

== Episodes ==
=== Series overview ===
| Season | Episodes | Originally released | | |
| Season | Episodes | First released | Last released | Network |
|---|---|---|---|---|
| 1 | 13 | October 2, 2000 | 2001 | Pax TV |
| 2 | 13 | January 5, 2009 | May 18, 2009 | MyNetworkTV |
| 3 | 4 | 2012 | 2012 | Syndication |
| 4 | 13 | August 1, 2014 | February 6, 2015 | The CW |
| 5 | 13 | July 10, 2015 | October 2, 2015 | The CW |
| 6 | 13 | May 20, 2016 | September 30, 2016 | The CW |
| 7 | 13 | June 30, 2017 | September 22, 2017 | The CW |
| 8 | 13 | June 29, 2018 | October 5, 2018 | The CW |
| 9 | 13 | June 7, 2019 | September 27, 2019 | The CW |
| 10 | 18 | May 15, 2020 | October 23, 2020 | The CW |
| 11 | 18 | April 9, 2022 | September 17, 2022 | The CW |
| 12 | 16 | February 11, 2023 | June 17, 2023 | The CW |
| 13 | 18 | November 6, 2023 | August 29, 2024 | The CW |
| 14 | 20 | January 24, 2025 | January 30, 2026 | The CW |

=== Season 1 (2000–01) ===
| No. overall | No. in season | Title | Original release date |
|---|---|---|---|
| 1 | 1 | "Episode 1" | October 2, 2000 |
| 2 | 2 | "Episode 2" | October 9, 2000 |
| 3 | 3 | "Episode 3" | October 16, 2000 |
| 4 | 4 | "Episode 4" | October 23, 2000 |

=== Season 2 (2009) ===
| No. overall | No. in season | Title | Original release date |
|---|---|---|---|
| 14 | 1 | "Episode 1" | January 5, 2009 |
| 15 | 2 | "Episode 2" | January 12, 2009 |
| 16 | 3 | "Episode 3" | January 19, 2009 |
| 17 | 4 | "Episode 4" | January 26, 2009 |
| 18 | 5 | "Episode 5" | March 2, 2009 |
| 19 | 6 | "Episode 6" | March 9, 2009 |
| 20 | 7 | "Episode 7" | March 16, 2009 |
| 21 | 8 | "Episode 8" | March 23, 2009 |
| 22 | 9 | "Episode 9" | March 30, 2009 |
| 23 | 10 | "Episode 10" | April 27, 2009 |
| 24 | 11 | "Episode 11" | May 4, 2009 |
| 25 | 12 | "Episode 12" | May 11, 2009 |
| 26 | 13 | "Episode 13" | May 18, 2009 |

=== Season 4 (2014–15) ===
| No. overall | No. in season | Title | Original release date | US viewers (millions) |
|---|---|---|---|---|
| 27 | 1 | "Jaws of Death" | August 1, 2014 | 1.06 |
| 28 | 2 | "Blindfold" | August 8, 2014 | 1.07 |
| 29 | 3 | "Vanish in Mid Air" | August 15, 2014 | 0.98 |
| 30 | 4 | "Selbit Sawing" | August 22, 2014 | 1.39 |
| 31 | 5 | "Walk Through Steel" | August 29, 2014 | 1.19 |
| 32 | 6 | "Chained" | September 5, 2014 | 1.59 |
| 33 | 7 | "Levitation" | September 12, 2014 | 1.37 |
| 34 | 8 | "Under Water" | September 19, 2014 | 1.48 |
| 35 | 9 | "Evil Met His Match" | September 26, 2014 | 1.01 |
| 36 | 10 | "Behind the Illusion" | January 9, 2015 | 0.65 |
| 37 | 11 | "Twist" | January 16, 2015 | 1.02 |
| 38 | 12 | "Close Up" | January 30, 2015 | 0.88 |
| 39 | 13 | "Quick Change" | February 6, 2015 | 0.95 |

=== Season 5 (2015) ===
| No. overall | No. in season | Title | Original release date | US viewers (millions) |
|---|---|---|---|---|
| 40 | 1 | "Spinning the Classics" | July 10, 2015 | 1.19 |
| 41 | 2 | "Jet Engines, Magic Ducks and Missing Torsos" | July 17, 2015 | 1.19 |
| 42 | 3 | "Metamorphosis and Imagine Dragons" | July 24, 2015 | 1.39 |
| 43 | 4 | "Perception, Piranhas and Pendragon" | July 31, 2015 | 1.24 |
| 44 | 5 | "Big Cats, Dream Girls and Fun Physics" | August 7, 2015 | 1.32 |
| 45 | 6 | "Very Sharp Objects and Flying Pianos" | August 14, 2015 | 1.23 |
| 46 | 7 | "Quick Change Duo, Box of Knives and Floating Beauty" | August 21, 2015 | 1.47 |
| 47 | 8 | "Gravity Defiers, Compactors and Transformations" | August 28, 2015 | 1.27 |
| 48 | 9 | "Spinning the Classics... Too!" | September 11, 2015 | 1.64 |
| 49 | 10 | "Deadly Desires and Non-Sensory Sensibilities" | September 18, 2015 | 1.29 |
| 50 | 11 | "Dancing Tables and Dodging Daggers" | September 25, 2015 | 1.35 |
| 51 | 12 | "Razzle Dazzle!" | October 2, 2015 | 1.31 |
| 52 | 13 | "Separating Mind, Body and Spirit" | October 2, 2015 | 1.34 |

=== Season 6 (2016) ===
| No. overall | No. in season | Title | Original release date | US viewers (millions) |
|---|---|---|---|---|
| 53 | 1 | "Techno Magic, Quick Change and a Guillotine" | May 20, 2016 | 1.38 |
| 54 | 2 | "A Magical Smorgasbord" | May 20, 2016 | 1.30 |
| 55 | 3 | "Classic Magic Mashups" | June 3, 2016 | 1.13 |
| 56 | 4 | "Beatbox Magic and the Human Beverage Dispenser" | June 10, 2016 | 1.02 |
| 57 | 5 | "Magical Metamorphoses and Masked Men" | June 17, 2016 | 1.05 |
| 58 | 6 | "Invisible Cards, Multipliers and One Chipper" | June 24, 2016 | 1.12 |
| 59 | 7 | "Extreme Levitations, Mind Melds and Water into Wine" | July 8, 2016 | 1.11 |
| 60 | 8 | "Altered States, Great Escapes, and the Return of the Mask" | July 15, 2016 | 0.99 |
| 61 | 9 | "Money Matters, Separation Anxiety and One Ninja Turtle" | July 29, 2016 | 0.86 |
| 62 | 10 | "Body Piercings, Mind Over Matters and Those Crazy Cards" | September 9, 2016 | 1.28 |
| 63 | 11 | "Magic in a Flash, From Thin Air, and One Nail" | September 16, 2016 | 1.01 |
| 64 | 12 | "A Loaf of Bread, A Magic Dollhouse, and Bound By Music" | September 23, 2016 | 0.73 |
| 65 | 13 | "Magic Pup, When Doves Fly, the Physical Transformations" | September 30, 2016 | 0.98 |

=== Season 7 (2017) ===
| No. overall | No. in season | Title | Original release date | US viewers (millions) |
|---|---|---|---|---|
| 66 | 1 | "Crazy, Crazy Cards and Silly Silhouettes" | June 30, 2017 | 1.00 |
| 67 | 2 | "Turbo Tech Magic and Card Connection" | June 30, 2017 | 0.92 |
| 68 | 3 | "Manipulation, Transformation and Two Impalers" | July 7, 2017 | 0.95 |
| 69 | 4 | "Maximum Separation and Chipper's Chipper" | July 7, 2017 | 0.88 |
| 70 | 5 | "Technological Beverages and Rapid-Fire Card" | July 14, 2017 | 0.98 |
| 71 | 6 | "Warped, Wacky and Weird" | July 21, 2017 | 1.22 |
| 72 | 7 | "Dancing Broomstick, Fast Coins, and One Giant Buzzsaw" | July 28, 2017 | 1.00 |
| 73 | 8 | "From the Exotic to Defying the Law of Physics" | August 4, 2017 | 1.17 |
| 74 | 9 | "Spiked Table and Spiked Faces" | August 11, 2017 | 0.87 |
| 75 | 10 | "Mirror Mirror and Money Movers" | August 18, 2017 | 1.02 |
| 76 | 11 | "Old School with a Twist" | September 8, 2017 | 1.37 |
| 77 | 12 | "The Things You Can Do with an Umbrella" | September 15, 2017 | 1.02 |
| 78 | 13 | "Of Mice, Men and a Kidd" | September 22, 2017 | 0.89 |

=== Season 8 (2018) ===
| No. overall | No. in season | Title | Original release date | US viewers (millions) |
|---|---|---|---|---|
| 79 | 1 | "It’s All In the Cards" | June 29, 2018 | 0.94 |
| 80 | 2 | "A Self-Inflicted Slice, Creepy Crawlies and Passing Glass" | July 6, 2018 | 1.09 |
| 81 | 3 | "The Fastest Illusion in the World... and More!" | July 13, 2018 | 1.07 |
| 82 | 4 | "Fast Hands, Classic Tricks, New Twists" | July 20, 2018 | 0.97 |
| 83 | 5 | "Twisted Classics" | July 27, 2018 | 0.75 |
| 84 | 6 | "The One with a Floating Orb and One Nasty Power Saw" | August 10, 2018 | 0.81 |
| 85 | 7 | "Broken Glass, a Box of Swords and Cards that Really Cut" | August 17, 2018 | 0.84 |
| 86 | 8 | "The Mind Freaks and the Million Dollar Trick" | August 31, 2018 | 0.79 |
| 87 | 9 | "Smart Money, Smart Phones and a Rising Pianist" | September 7, 2018 | 1.11 |
| 88 | 10 | "More Twists on the Classics" | September 14, 2018 | 0.83 |
| 89 | 11 | "All about the Benjamin’s and One Switcheroo" | September 21, 2018 | 0.87 |
| 90 | 12 | "A Symphony of Magic" | September 28, 2018 | 0.67 |
| 91 | 13 | "Fast Hands, Loose Change and a Bird Out of a Cannon" | October 5, 2018 | 0.82 |

=== Season 9 (2019) ===
| No. overall | No. in season | Title | Original release date | US viewers (millions) |
|---|---|---|---|---|
| 92 | 1 | "Goth Magic, Deceptive Antics, and Water Submersion" | June 7, 2019 | 0.94 |
| 93 | 2 | "Dancing Objects, Neon Magic, and Ed Alonzo" | June 7, 2019 | 0.90 |
| 94 | 3 | "Card Darts, Speed Magic, and Figaro" | June 14, 2019 | 0.84 |
| 95 | 4 | "Human Voodoo Doll and a Seance" | June 21, 2019 | 0.79 |
| 96 | 5 | "Putting Our Cards on the Table" | June 28, 2019 | 0.81 |
| 97 | 6 | "Floating Fire, Quick Hands, and One Spidey" | July 19, 2019 | 0.80 |
| 98 | 7 | "Ultimate Mind Readers and One Big Green Bag" | July 26, 2019 | 0.82 |
| 99 | 8 | "A Kidd, The Wind, And Dan Sperry's Eyeball of Thread" | August 2, 2019 | 0.77 |
| 100 | 9 | "Perishing Piano, Mesmerizing Minds, and a Little Red Ball" | August 9, 2019 | 0.65 |
| 101 | 10 | "Random Feats of Magic and One Fireball" | August 23, 2019 | 0.78 |
| 102 | 11 | "Amazing Twist on the Classics and Spray Paint Designer" | August 30, 2019 | 0.70 |
| 103 | 12 | "Going Mental, Stretching the Money, and Houdini on the Rope" | September 20, 2019 | 0.66 |
| 104 | 13 | "Game Show Magic, Money Fun Box, and Breaking the Chain" | September 27, 2019 | 0.67 |

=== Season 10 (2020) ===
| No. overall | No. in season | Title | Original release date | US viewers (millions) |
|---|---|---|---|---|
| 105 | 1 | "Quick Changes, The Bird King, and Very Sharp Objects" | May 15, 2020 | 0.76 |
| 106 | 2 | "The Sphere of Fog, Crossbows, and More Ed Alonzo" | May 15, 2020 | 0.58 |
| 107 | 3 | "Alex, I'll Take Pickpockets and Monkeys for $1000" | May 22, 2020 | 0.85 |
| 108 | 4 | "Virtual Magic, Psychic Worms, and Hans Klok" | May 29, 2020 | 0.79 |
| 109 | 5 | "The Blind Magician and Floating Off a Barstool" | June 5, 2020 | 0.66 |
| 110 | 6 | "Crossbow Roulette and Magic Just for the Funovits" | June 12, 2020 | 0.75 |
| 111 | 7 | "Video Magic and the Magical Murder Mystery Tour" | June 19, 2020 | 0.70 |
| 112 | 8 | "Laughs, Levitations, and Lies" | June 26, 2020 | 0.77 |
| 113 | 9 | "Cell Phone Hack, Water Torture, and Alonzo's Shop of Horrors" | July 10, 2020 | 0.73 |
| 114 | 10 | "All the Kings Clubs, Motorcycles, and Let's Get Small" | July 17, 2020 | 0.72 |
| 115 | 11 | "The Sound of Magic and the Intrusive Rop" | August 7, 2020 | 0.53 |
| 116 | 12 | "Copycats, Magical Matrimony, and Moments in Time" | August 28, 2020 | 0.67 |
| 117 | 13 | "Insane Twists on the Classics" | September 18, 2020 | 0.63 |
| 118 | 14 | "Brick Walls, Plexiglass, and a Fish Hook Endoscopy" | September 25, 2020 | 0.59 |
| 119 | 15 | "Window Panes, Ring Crushers, and the Magic Earthworm" | October 2, 2020 | 0.49 |
| 120 | 16 | "A New Twist on the Classics" | October 9, 2020 | 0.52 |
| 121 | 17 | "Body, Mind and Transformations" | October 16, 2020 | 0.67 |
| 122 | 18 | "Supercharging Your Very First Magic Tricks" | October 23, 2020 | 0.66 |

=== Season 11 (2022) ===
| No. overall | No. in season | Title | Original release date | US viewers (millions) |
|---|---|---|---|---|
| 123 | 1 | "Matters of the Head" | April 9, 2022 | 0.45 |
| 124 | 2 | "The William Tell Experiment" | April 16, 2022 | 0.26 |
| 125 | 3 | "The Classics Remixed" | April 23, 2022 | 0.31 |
| 126 | 4 | "Music and Tech Magic" | April 30, 2022 | 0.24 |
| 127 | 5 | "The One About a Chipper, Sawchuck and a Cook" | May 7, 2022 | 0.36 |
| 128 | 6 | "The Bed of Nails and the Magic Wand" | May 14, 2022 | 0.26 |
| 129 | 7 | "Of Mind and Body" | May 21, 2022 | 0.44 |
| 130 | 8 | "Body Transformation" | June 4, 2022 | 0.27 |
| 131 | 9 | "Cool Cards, Coins and Close-Ups" | June 11, 2022 | 0.26 |
| 132 | 10 | "A Smorgasbord of Magic" | June 18, 2022 | 0.26 |
| 133 | 11 | "Mind or Magic?" | June 25, 2022 | 0.32 |
| 134 | 12 | "Mystery Magic, Techno Time Travel, And Math Magic" | July 9, 2022 | 0.32 |
| 135 | 13 | "Right Before Your Very Eyes" | July 16, 2022 | 0.38 |
| 136 | 14 | "Up Close and Personal" | August 13, 2022 | 0.25 |
| 137 | 15 | "When Goth Meets the Art of the Illusion" | August 20, 2022 | 0.32 |
| 138 | 16 | "Funky Magic and the Dancing Flame" | August 27, 2022 | 0.39 |
| 139 | 17 | "A Magical Musical" | September 10, 2022 | 0.28 |
| 140 | 18 | "The Extreme Exotic" | September 17, 2022 | 0.29 |

=== Special (2022) ===
| Title | Original release date | US viewers (millions) |
|---|---|---|
| "Masters of Illusion: Christmas Magic 2022" | December 14, 2022 | 0.50 |

=== Season 12 (2023) ===
| No. overall | No. in season | Title | Original release date | US viewers (millions) |
|---|---|---|---|---|
| 141 | 1 | "Deception, Heights, and One Crossbow" | February 11, 2023 | 0.46 |
| 142 | 2 | "Blocks, Crystals, and Cocktails" | February 18, 2023 | 0.44 |
| 143 | 3 | "Flash, Shine, and Wonderland" | February 25, 2023 | 0.53 |
| 144 | 4 | "History, Mystery and Hilarity" | March 4, 2023 | 0.44 |
| 145 | 5 | "Mind Tricks, Time Travel, and Sharp Things" | March 11, 2023 | 0.41 |
| 146 | 6 | "Love, Fashion and Money" | March 18, 2023 | 0.37 |
| 147 | 7 | "Conjurors, A Darling, and the Most Dangerous Card Trick" | April 8, 2023 | 0.33 |
| 148 | 8 | "Fire, Crush, and the Wacky Tacky Box" | April 15, 2023 | 0.39 |
| 149 | 9 | "Science, Oracles, and a Twist on Houdini" | April 22, 2023 | 0.29 |
| 150 | 10 | "Bubbly Pop, Magic Tech, and the Impaler" | April 29, 2023 | 0.34 |
| 151 | 11 | "Old School Remix Volume I" | May 6, 2023 | 0.24 |
| 152 | 12 | "A Very Sperry Cherry, Darling" | May 13, 2023 | 0.31 |
| 153 | 13 | "A Carpenter, Endless Wine and ... Ed Alonzo?" | May 20, 2023 | 0.29 |
| 154 | 14 | "Old School Remix Volume II" | June 3, 2023 | 0.26 |
| 155 | 15 | "Twists, Turns and the Magic Body Shop" | June 10, 2023 | 0.30 |
| 156 | 16 | "Fire, Bubbles, and Soul Mates" | June 17, 2023 | 0.25 |

=== Season 13 (2023–24) ===
| No. overall | No. in season | Title | Original release date | US viewers (millions) |
|---|---|---|---|---|
| 157 | 1 | "Knives Out and Other Strange Magic" | November 6, 2023 | 0.27 |
| 158 | 2 | "Giant Drill, Magic on the Edge, Floating Objects" | November 13, 2023 | 0.22 |
| 159 | 3 | "Trial By Fire, Quick Change, and the Uncanny" | November 20, 2023 | 0.27 |
| 160 | 4 | "Real, Tech, and the Triple Threat" | November 27, 2023 | 0.27 |
| 161 | 5 | "Dark, Darling and Twisted" | December 4, 2023 | 0.32 |
| 162 | 6 | "Cool, Crazy and Close-up" | January 12, 2024 | 0.37 |
| 163 | 7 | "Pushing the Limits of Crazy Fun Magic" | January 19, 2024 | 0.39 |
| 164 | 8 | "True Magic, Lollipops, and Blades of Death" | January 26, 2024 | 0.40 |
| 165 | 9 | "Flames, Floating, and Out of this World" | June 20, 2024 | 0.30 |
| 166 | 10 | "The Beauty of Magic, Through the Metal Door, and My Magic Robot" | June 27, 2024 | 0.26 |
| 167 | 11 | "Mystic Roses, the Lucky Ring, and a Magical Romance" | July 4, 2024 | 0.19 |
| 168 | 12 | "Pup Magic, Twisted Cards, and a Buzzsaw of Death" | July 11, 2024 | 0.25 |
| 169 | 13 | "The Gospel of Magic, Finding Aces, Elephant in the Room" | July 18, 2024 | 0.32 |
| 170 | 14 | "Fun with Cards, Fruit Bouquet, and Mass Audience Magic" | July 25, 2024 | 0.28 |
| 171 | 15 | "Ropes, Fears, and Dark Magic" | August 8, 2024 | 0.20 |
| 172 | 16 | "Bullet Catch, AI Magic, and the Magic Lamp" | August 15, 2024 | 0.28 |
| 173 | 17 | "The Magic Bartender, Master Class Close-Up, Rapid Fire Cards" | August 22, 2024 | 0.28 |
| 174 | 18 | "Magical Gamble, Mayhem, and Passing Through Metal" | August 29, 2024 | 0.31 |

=== Season 14 (2025–26) ===
| No. overall | No. in season | Title | Original release date | US viewers (millions) |
|---|---|---|---|---|
Part 1
| 175 | 1 | "Logically Illogical, AI Mind Reader, and Phone-y Magic" | January 24, 2025 | 0.48 |
| 176 | 2 | "Sizzles, Twists, and Blurred Realities" | January 31, 2025 | 0.49 |
| 177 | 3 | "The Bold and the Beauty with a Crossbow" | February 7, 2025 | 0.33 |
| 178 | 4 | "Optics, Glass, and a Rubberband Man" | February 14, 2025 | 0.37 |
| 179 | 5 | "Blind Sight, Sensual Magic, and The Butterfly Effect" | February 21, 2025 | 0.39 |
| 180 | 6 | "Magic Game Shows, Coins, and Prison Bars" | February 28, 2025 | 0.34 |
| 181 | 7 | "Feet, Forks, and Felines" | March 7, 2025 | 0.34 |
| 182 | 8 | "Straitjacket Surfing, Winning the Lottery, and Channeling Houdini" | March 14, 2025 | 0.38 |
| 183 | 9 | "Science, Whips, and Flush Paper" | March 21, 2025 | 0.37 |
| 184 | 10 | "Spikes, Love, and Hen Solo" | March 28, 2025 | 0.40 |
Part 2
| 185 | 11 | "Gothic Birds, Vacuums, and the Letters of Fate" | October 10, 2025 | 0.35 |
| 186 | 12 | "Poker, Liars, and the Jaws of Death" | October 17, 2025 | 0.30 |
| 187 | 13 | "Pickpockets, Blinded Crossbow, and a Magic Bunny" | October 24, 2025 | 0.43 |
| 188 | 14 | "Woman of Fire, Levitation, and a Dean Cain Amputation" | November 7, 2025 | 0.37 |
| 189 | 15 | "Mind Matters, Premonitions and the Circus of Magic" | November 14, 2025 | 0.32 |
| 190 | 16 | "The Magic Fly, Bent Forks, and the Floating Orb" | November 21, 2025 | 0.37 |
| 191 | 17 | "Impressions, Birdmen, and the Magic Mirror" | December 5, 2025 | N/A |
| 192 | 18 | "Blades, Fire, and Random Risks" | January 9, 2026 | N/A |
| 193 | 19 | "Vivisection, Sacred Riana, and 28 Steel Spikes" | January 16, 2026 | N/A |
| 194 | 20 | "Cellophane Escape, The Surreal, and The Magic of Tomorrow" | January 30, 2026 | N/A |

== See also ==
- Academy of Magical Arts
