= Los Angeles Port Police =

Port of Los Angeles Police
- Los Angeles Port Police patch

- Badge of the Los Angeles Port Police
- Common name: Los Angeles Port Police
- Motto: "Sworn to protect, dedicated to serve"

Agency overview
- Formed: 1911
- Employees: 261

Jurisdictional structure
- Operations jurisdiction: Los Angeles, California, United States
- Legal jurisdiction: 7,500 acres (3035 hectares)
- Secondary governing body: Los Angeles City Council
- General nature: Civilian police

Operational structure
- Police Officers: Approx. 135
- Civilian Staffs: 96
- Agency executive: Thomas E. Gazsi, Chief of Police

Notables
- Anniversary: 2011

Website
- Official Site

The Los Angeles Port Police (LAPP) is a specialized law enforcement agency at the Port of Los Angeles, under the control of the Los Angeles Harbor Department (WorldPort LA) and the City of Los Angeles. They are one of the few agencies in the nation that has a dedicated 24-hour marine unit. They have officers on boats 24 hours a day 7 days a week, and they are one of the few U.S. police forces dedicated exclusively to port activities. Los Angeles Port Police officers are sworn California Peace Officers and have the same rights and abilities as any other law enforcement officer. All port police officers respond to general calls for service, including domestic violence issues, commercial burglary calls, and drug busts.

== Divisions and task forces ==
- The regular patrol division: Officers patrol the waterways, Terminal Island, San Pedro, and Wilmington by boat, vehicle, motorcycle and bicycle.
- Motor Unit: Mostly used for truck safety on Terminal Island and other container terminals.
- K-9s: Used for entries on land & on the water, used to search vessels and to detect bombs or narcotics at cruise terminals, containers, etc.
- A marine unit.
- A full-time dive unit
- Bicycle patrol
- Community relation

Physical Operations:

- Tactical Planning
- Intelligence & Investigate Section
- Training Section: N/A

The Port Police does joint boardings with the U.S. Coast Guard to prevent crimes such as narcotics smuggling and human trafficking.

The Port Police train at the LAPD Academy.

The Los Angeles Port Police staff 125 sworn officers and 96 civilian staff as of March 2015. Their motto is "sworn to protect, dedicated to serve."

== See also ==
- Los Angeles Police Department
- Los Angeles Fire Department
- Port Authority of New York and New Jersey
