= Control Room Presents =

American television series

Control Room Presents is a series which aired on MyNetworkTV in the United States from October 1, 2007, to March 15, 2008.

The program aired previously recorded music concerts from various popular artists.
