= Celebrity Exposé =

American television series

Celebrity Exposé is a reality television series from the producers of Access Hollywood which premiered on MyNetworkTV in fall 2007. Hosted by Access Hollywood's Tony Potts, Celebrity Exposé gave "viewers an in-depth, hour-long look at all the sizzling details and latest developments on stories and events on some of the hottest Hollywood stars.".

On October 25, 2008, Celebrity Exposé ended its run on MyNetworkTV.
