= SAFE =

SAFE may stand for:

== Acts and projects ==
- SAFE Act, one of many passed or proposed laws with this name
- Strategic Action For Emergencies, a fictional group to counter S.H.I.E.L.D. in Marvel Comics
- Synchronized Armed Forces Europe, the concept of synchronising of the European military forces

== Organisations ==
- SAFE (New Zealand organisation), Save Animals From Exploitation, a New Zealand animal advocacy organisation
- SAFE Society of Aviation and Flight Educators, a professional aviation organization
- SAFE Stroke Alliance for Europe, a coalition of charities that support stroke survivors
- SAFE (Struggle Against Financial Exploitation), a UK Parliamentary Working Group who campaign against financial fraud and deception
- Safe Ireland, anti-domestic violence organization, fund-raised for by Hozier's song "Cherry Wine"
- Security Action for Europe (SAFE), an EU financial instrument for defense spending
- State Administration of Foreign Exchange (SAFE), an agency of the People's Republic of China

== Science and technology ==
- Scaled agile framework (SAFe), a process framework for running Agile software development projects at scale
- SAFE (cable system), South Africa Far East cable, an underwater communications cable linking South Africa and Malaysia
- Safe affordable fission engine, a series of small experimental nuclear reactors designed by NASA
- Survivor Activating Factor Enhancement, a metabolic pathway

== Investing ==
- Simple agreement for future equity (SAFE), a financing vehicle for startup businesses providing an alternative to a priced equity round or to a convertible note

== See also ==
- Safe (disambiguation)
