= Safe (disambiguation) =

A safe is a secure lockable box used for securing valuable objects against theft or damage.

Safe may also refer to:

== Films ==
- Safe (1995 film), a 1995 drama film by Todd Haynes, starring Julianne Moore
- Safe (2012 film), a 2012 action film by Boaz Yakin, starring Jason Statham

== Music ==
- Safe (band), a Russian rock-band from Palekh
- Safe (musician), singer, rapper, and songwriter
- Safe (EP), the second EP by Kittie in 2002
- "Safe" (Cardi B song), 2025
- "Safe" (Westlife song), 2010
- "Safe" (Phil Wickham song), 2009
- "Safe", a song by 2hollis from Star, 2025
- "Safe", a song by All Time Low from Wake Up, Sunshine, 2020
- "Safe", a song by David Bowie from Heathen, 2002

== Television ==
- Safe (1993 film), a 1993 television film directed by Antonia Bird that won the BAFTA Television Award for Best Single Drama
- Safe (TV series), a 2018 television drama mini-series created by crime author Harlan Coben
- "Safe" (Firefly), the fifth episode of television science fiction drama series Firefly
- "Safe" (Fringe), the tenth episode of the first season of television science fiction drama series Fringe
- "Safe" (House), the sixteenth episode of the second season of television medical drama series House
- "Safe", the finale episode of television police procedural drama series The Protector

== Laws and regulations ==
- New York Safe Act of 2013
- Secure and Fair Elections Act, or SAFE, Kansas's Voter identification law, enacted in 2011
- Secure and Fair Enforcement for Mortgage Licensing Act of 2008, or SAFE
- Securing Adolescents From Exploitation-Online Act of 2007, or SAFE
- Security and Freedom Ensured Act of 2003, or SAFE

== Other uses ==
- Safe, Missouri, a community in the United States
- Safe, an object classification in the SCP Foundation storytelling project
- Safe (baseball), baseball terminology
- Safe house
- Safe room
- "Safe" seat, in the nomenclature of political forecasting, a seat that is unlikely to change hands
- Scaled Agile Framework, or SAFe
- State Administration of Foreign Exchange, or SAFE, the Chinese Ministry responsible for foreign currency exchange
- Security Action for Europe, or SAFE, a European Union program created in 2025 to facilitate joint purchases of arms and military equipment
- Simple Agreement for Future Equity, or SAFE (occasionally written 'Safe'), a mechanism for seed investment financing

== See also ==
- SAFE (disambiguation)
- Child-safe environment, see Child protection
- Fail-safe (disambiguation)
- Safe from Harm (disambiguation)
- Safety
- Strong box (disambiguation)
