= 2010–11 United States network television schedule =

Television schedule for the fall of 2010

The 2010–11 network television schedule for the five major English language commercial broadcast networks in the United States covers prime time hours from September 2010 through August 2011. The schedule is followed by a list per network of returning series, new series, and series canceled after the 2009–10 season. As in previous years, the schedule omits the Public Broadcasting Service (whose programming is listed here).

NBC was the first to announce its fall schedule on May 16, 2010, followed by Fox on May 17, ABC on May 18, CBS on May 19, and The CW on May 20, 2010.

PBS is not included; member stations have local flexibility over most of their schedules and broadcast times for network shows may vary. Ion Television is also not included since the network's schedule consisted mainly of syndicated reruns and movies. The CW is not included on weekends, since it does not offer network programming. Beginning this season, MyNetworkTV is completely excluded similarly to The CW Plus; with the loss of WWE Friday Night SmackDown to Syfy, it has a schedule of all archived and rerun programming.

New series are highlighted in bold.

All times are U.S. Eastern and Pacific Time (except for some live sports or events). Subtract one hour for Central, Mountain, Alaska, and Hawaii–Aleutian times.

Each of the 30 highest-rated shows is listed with its rank and rating as determined by Nielsen Media Research.

== Legend ==
- Light blue indicates local programming.
- Gray indicates encore programming.
- Blue-gray indicates news programming.
- Light green indicates sporting events.
- Light purple indicates movies.
- Red indicates series being burned off and other regularly scheduled programs including specials.
- Yellow indicates the top-10 most watched programs of the season.
- Cyan indicates the top-20 most watched programs of the season.
- Magenta indicates the top-30 most watched programs of the season.

== Sunday ==
Network		7:00 p.m.	7:30 p.m.	8:00 p.m.	8:30 p.m.	9:00 p.m.	9:30 p.m.	10:00 p.m.	10:30 p.m.
ABC	Fall	America's Funniest Home Videos		Extreme Makeover: Home Edition		Desperate Housewives (17/7.5) (Tied with The Voice, Hawaii Five-0 and Grey's Anatomy)		Brothers & Sisters	
ABC	Winter	America's Funniest Home Videos		Extreme Makeover: Home Edition		Desperate Housewives (17/7.5) (Tied with The Voice, Hawaii Five-0 and Grey's Anatomy)		Brothers & Sisters	
ABC	Spring	America's Funniest Home Videos		Secret Millionaire		Desperate Housewives (17/7.5) (Tied with The Voice, Hawaii Five-0 and Grey's Anatomy)		Brothers & Sisters	
ABC	Late spring	America's Funniest Home Videos		Extreme Makeover: Home Edition		Desperate Housewives (17/7.5) (Tied with The Voice, Hawaii Five-0 and Grey's Anatomy)		Brothers & Sisters	
ABC	Summer	America's Funniest Home Videos		Extreme Makeover: Home Edition		Castle (R)		**Body of Proof** (R)	
CBS	Fall	60 Minutes (12/8.4) (Tied with CSI: Crime Scene Investigation)		The Amazing Race		Undercover Boss (25/7.1) (Tied with Modern Family)		CSI: Miami (22/7.3) (Tied with **Harry's Law** and Undercover Boss)	
CBS	Winter	60 Minutes (12/8.4) (Tied with CSI: Crime Scene Investigation)		CSI: Miami (22/7.3) (Tied with **Harry's Law** and Undercover Boss)		Undercover Boss (25/7.1) (Tied with Modern Family)		CSI: Miami (22/7.3) (Tied with **Harry's Law** and Undercover Boss)	
CBS	Mid-winter	60 Minutes (12/8.4) (Tied with CSI: Crime Scene Investigation)		The Amazing Race		Undercover Boss (25/7.1) (Tied with Modern Family)		CSI: Miami (22/7.3) (Tied with **Harry's Law** and Undercover Boss)	
CBS	Spring	60 Minutes (12/8.4) (Tied with CSI: Crime Scene Investigation)		The Amazing Race		Undercover Boss (25/7.1) (Tied with Modern Family)		CSI: Miami (22/7.3) (Tied with **Harry's Law** and Undercover Boss)	
CBS	Summer	60 Minutes (12/8.4) (Tied with CSI: Crime Scene Investigation)		Big Brother		**Same Name**		CSI: Miami (22/7.3) (Tied with **Harry's Law** and Undercover Boss)	
CBS	Mid-summer	60 Minutes (12/8.4) (Tied with CSI: Crime Scene Investigation)		Big Brother		The Good Wife (R)		CSI: Miami (22/7.3) (Tied with **Harry's Law** and Undercover Boss)	
Fox	Fall	Fox NFL (4:15 p.m.)	The OT	The Simpsons	The Cleveland Show	Family Guy	American Dad!	Local programming	
Fox	Winter	The Simpsons (R)	American Dad!	The Simpsons	**Bob's Burgers**	Family Guy	The Cleveland Show	Local programming	
Fox	Spring	The Simpsons (R)	American Dad!	The Simpsons	**Bob's Burgers**	Family Guy	The Cleveland Show	Local programming	
Fox	Summer	American Dad! (R)	**Bob's Burgers** (R)	The Simpsons	The Cleveland Show (R)	Family Guy	American Dad! (R)	Local programming	
NBC	Fall	Football Night in America		NBC Sunday Night Football (8:15 p.m.) (continued to game completion) (4/12.7)					
NBC	Winter	Dateline NBC		Various Movies, repeats or Specials					
NBC	Spring	Dateline NBC		**America's Next Great Restaurant**		The Apprentice			
NBC	Summer	Dateline NBC		Encore programming				The Marriage Ref	

== Monday ==
Network		8:00 p.m.	8:30 p.m.	9:00 p.m.	9:30 p.m.	10:00 p.m.	10:30 p.m.
ABC	Fall	Dancing with the Stars (2/13.8)				Castle (22/7.3) (Tied with **Harry's Law** and CSI: Miami)	
ABC	Late fall	Holiday specials		**Skating with the Stars**		Castle (22/7.3) (Tied with **Harry's Law** and CSI: Miami)	
ABC	Winter	The Bachelor (27/7.0) (Tied with Bones)				Castle (22/7.3) (Tied with **Harry's Law** and CSI: Miami)	
ABC	Spring	Dancing with the Stars (2/13.8)				Castle (22/7.3) (Tied with **Harry's Law** and CSI: Miami)	
ABC	Summer	The Bachelorette				**Extreme Makeover: Weight Loss Edition**	
ABC	Mid-summer	Bachelor Pad				**Extreme Makeover: Weight Loss Edition**	
CBS	Fall	How I Met Your Mother	Rules of Engagement	Two and a Half Men (16/7.7)	**Mike & Molly** (29/6.9) (Tied with Criminal Minds: Suspect Behavior)	**Hawaii Five-0** (17/7.5) (Tied with The Voice, Desperate Housewives and Grey's Anatomy)	
CBS	Winter	How I Met Your Mother	**Mad Love**	Two and a Half Men (16/7.7)	**Mike & Molly** (29/6.9) (Tied with Criminal Minds: Suspect Behavior)	**Hawaii Five-0** (17/7.5) (Tied with The Voice, Desperate Housewives and Grey's Anatomy)	
CBS	Spring	How I Met Your Mother	**Mad Love**	Two and a Half Men (16/7.7)	**Mike & Molly** (29/6.9) (Tied with Criminal Minds: Suspect Behavior)	**Hawaii Five-0** (17/7.5) (Tied with The Voice, Desperate Housewives and Grey's Anatomy)	
CBS	Summer	How I Met Your Mother	**Mad Love**	Two and a Half Men (16/7.7)	**Mike & Molly** (29/6.9) (Tied with Criminal Minds: Suspect Behavior)	**Hawaii Five-0** (17/7.5) (Tied with The Voice, Desperate Housewives and Grey's Anatomy)	
The CW	Fall	90210		Gossip Girl		Local programming	
The CW	Winter	90210		Gossip Girl		Local programming	
The CW	Spring	90210		Gossip Girl		Local programming	
The CW	Summer	Gossip Girl (R)		One Tree Hill (R)		Local programming	
Fox	Fall	House		**Lone Star**		Local programming	
Fox	Mid-fall	House		Lie to Me		Local programming	
Fox	Winter	House		**The Chicago Code**		Local programming	
Fox	Spring	House		**The Chicago Code**		Local programming	
Fox	Summer	MasterChef				Local programming	
NBC	Fall	Chuck		**The Event**		**Chase**	
NBC	Winter	The Sing-Off				**Chase**	
NBC	Mid-winter	Chuck		**The Cape**		**Harry's Law** (22/7.3) (Tied with CSI: Miami and Castle)	
NBC	Spring	Chuck		**The Event**		**Harry's Law** (22/7.3) (Tied with CSI: Miami and Castle)	
NBC	Mid-spring	Chuck		**The Event**		**Law & Order: LA**	
NBC	Summer	Various programming				Law & Order: Criminal Intent (R)	

Note: In February 2011, CBS and Warner Bros. stop producing Two and a Half Men for the rest of the season because of the firing of Charlie Sheen. So it aired reruns of the show.

== Tuesday ==
Network		8:00 p.m.	8:30 p.m.	9:00 p.m.	9:30 p.m.	10:00 p.m.	10:30 p.m.
ABC	Fall	**No Ordinary Family**		Dancing with the Stars (Results) (5/11.8) (Tied with NCIS)		**Detroit 1-8-7**	
ABC	Winter	Holiday specials		**No Ordinary Family**		**Detroit 1-8-7**	
ABC	Mid-winter	**No Ordinary Family**		V		**Detroit 1-8-7**	
ABC	Spring	Jamie Oliver's Food Revolution		Dancing with the Stars (Results) (5/11.8) (Tied with NCIS)		**Body of Proof** (9/9.0)	
ABC	Mid-spring	Dancing with the Stars (R)		Dancing with the Stars (Results) (5/11.8) (Tied with NCIS)		**Body of Proof** (9/9.0)	
ABC	Summer	Wipeout		**101 Ways to Leave a Game Show**		**Combat Hospital**	
CBS		NCIS (5/11.8) (Tied with Dancing with the Stars (Results))		NCIS: Los Angeles (7/10.1)		The Good Wife (11/8.5)	
The CW	Fall	One Tree Hill		Life Unexpected		Local programming	
The CW	Winter	One Tree Hill		**Hellcats**		Local programming	
The CW	Spring	One Tree Hill		**Hellcats**		Local programming	
The CW	Summer	90210 (R)		**Shedding for the Wedding** (R)		Local programming	
Fox	Fall	Glee		**Raising Hope**	**Running Wilde**	Local programming	
Fox	Winter	Glee		**Million Dollar Money Drop**		Local programming	
Fox	Mid-winter	Glee		**Raising Hope**	**Traffic Light**	Local programming	
Fox	Spring	Glee		**Raising Hope**	**Traffic Light**	Local programming	
Fox	Summer	MasterChef		**Raising Hope**	**Raising Hope** (R)	Local programming	
Fox	Mid-summer	Hell's Kitchen		MasterChef		Local programming	
Fox	Late summer	Glee (R)		**Raising Hope** (R)		Local programming	
NBC	Fall	The Biggest Loser				Parenthood	
NBC	Mid-fall	Holiday specials		The Biggest Loser			
NBC	Winter	The Biggest Loser				Parenthood	
NBC	Spring	The Biggest Loser		**The Voice** (17/7.5) (Tied with Hawaii Five-0, Desperate Housewives and Grey's Anatomy)			
NBC	Mid-spring	The Biggest Loser				**The Voice** (17/7.5) (Tied with Hawaii Five-0, Desperate Housewives and Grey's Anatomy)	
NBC	Summer	America's Got Talent				Parenthood (R)	

== Wednesday ==
Network		8:00 p.m.	8:30 p.m.	9:00 p.m.	9:30 p.m.	10:00 p.m.	10:30 p.m.
ABC	Fall	The Middle	**Better with You**	Modern Family (25/7.1) (Tied with Undercover Boss)	Cougar Town	**The Whole Truth**	
ABC	Winter	The Middle	**Better with You**	Modern Family (25/7.1) (Tied with Undercover Boss)	Cougar Town	**Off the Map**	
ABC	Late winter	The Middle	**Better with You**	Modern Family (25/7.1) (Tied with Undercover Boss)	**Mr. Sunshine**	**Off the Map**	
ABC	Spring	The Middle	**Better with You**	Modern Family (25/7.1) (Tied with Undercover Boss)	Cougar Town	**Happy Endings**	
ABC	Summer	The Middle	The Middle (R)	Modern Family (25/7.1) (Tied with Undercover Boss)	**Happy Endings** (R)	Primetime	
ABC	Mid-summer	The Middle	Modern Family (R)	Modern Family (25/7.1) (Tied with Undercover Boss)	**Happy Endings** (R)	Primetime	
ABC	Late summer	The Middle	The Middle (R)	Modern Family (25/7.1) (Tied with Undercover Boss)	Modern Family (R)	Primetime	
CBS	Fall	Survivor: Nicaragua (21/7.4)		Criminal Minds (10/8.7)		**The Defenders**	
CBS	Winter	**Live to Dance**		Criminal Minds (10/8.7)		**Blue Bloods** (14/8.0) (Tied with The Big Bang Theory)	
CBS	Spring	Survivor: Redemption Island (21/7.4)		Criminal Minds (10/8.7)		**Criminal Minds: Suspect Behavior** (29/6.9) (Tied with Mike & Molly)	
CBS	Summer	Big Brother		Criminal Minds (10/8.7)		CSI: Crime Scene Investigation (R)	
The CW	Fall	America's Next Top Model		**Hellcats**		Local programming	
The CW	Winter	America's Next Top Model		**Shedding for the Wedding**		Local programming	
The CW	Spring	America's Next Top Model (R)		America's Next Top Model		Local programming	
The CW	Summer	America's Next Top Model (R)				Local programming	
Fox	Fall	Hell's Kitchen				Local programming	
Fox	Mid-fall	Human Target		Hell's Kitchen		Local programming	
Fox	Winter	Human Target				Local programming	
Fox	Mid-winter	American Idol (1/14.5)				Local programming	
Fox	Late winter	American Idol (1/14.5)		Human Target		Local programming	
Fox	Spring	American Idol (1/14.5)				Local programming	
Fox	Mid-spring	American Idol (1/14.5)			**Breaking In**	Local programming	
Fox	Late spring	So You Think You Can Dance				Local programming	
Fox	Summer	**Buried Treasure**		**Buried Treasure** (R)		Local programming	
NBC	Fall	**Undercovers**		Law & Order: Special Victims Unit		**Law & Order: LA**	
NBC	Winter	The Sing-Off		Law & Order: Special Victims Unit		**Law & Order: LA**	
NBC	Mid-winter	Minute to Win It		**Chase**		Law & Order: Special Victims Unit	
NBC	Late winter	Minute to Win It				Law & Order: Special Victims Unit	
NBC	Spring	Minute to Win It				Law & Order: Special Victims Unit	
NBC	Summer	Minute to Win It		America's Got Talent		**Love in the Wild**	

== Thursday ==
Network		8:00 p.m.	8:30 p.m.	9:00 p.m.	9:30 p.m.	10:00 p.m.	10:30 p.m.
ABC	Fall	Grey's Anatomy (R)		Grey's Anatomy (17/7.5) (Tied with The Voice, Hawaii Five-0 and Desperate Housewives)		Private Practice	
ABC	Winter	Holiday Specials		Grey's Anatomy (17/7.5) (Tied with The Voice, Hawaii Five-0 and Desperate Housewives)		Private Practice	
ABC	Mid-winter	Wipeout		Grey's Anatomy (17/7.5) (Tied with The Voice, Hawaii Five-0 and Desperate Housewives)		Private Practice	
ABC	Spring	Wipeout		Grey's Anatomy (17/7.5) (Tied with The Voice, Hawaii Five-0 and Desperate Housewives)		Private Practice	
ABC	Summer	**Expedition Impossible**		Grey's Anatomy (17/7.5) (Tied with The Voice, Hawaii Five-0 and Desperate Housewives)		Rookie Blue	
ABC	Late summer	**Take the Money & Run**		Grey's Anatomy (17/7.5) (Tied with The Voice, Hawaii Five-0 and Desperate Housewives)		Rookie Blue	
CBS	Fall	The Big Bang Theory (14/8.0) (Tied with Blue Bloods)	$#*! My Dad Says	CSI: Crime Scene Investigation (12/8.4) (Tied with 60 Minutes)		The Mentalist (8/9.6)	
CBS	Winter	The Big Bang Theory (14/8.0) (Tied with Blue Bloods)	Rules of Engagement	CSI: Crime Scene Investigation (12/8.4) (Tied with 60 Minutes)		The Mentalist (8/9.6)	
CBS	Spring	The Big Bang Theory (14/8.0) (Tied with Blue Bloods)	Rules of Engagement	CSI: Crime Scene Investigation (12/8.4) (Tied with 60 Minutes)		The Mentalist (8/9.6)	
CBS	Summer	The Big Bang Theory (14/8.0) (Tied with Blue Bloods)	Rules of Engagement	Big Brother		The Mentalist (8/9.6)	
The CW	Fall	The Vampire Diaries		**Nikita**		Local programming	
The CW	Winter	The Vampire Diaries		**Nikita**		Local programming	
The CW	Spring	The Vampire Diaries		**Nikita**		Local programming	
The CW	Summer	The Vampire Diaries		Plain Jane (R)		Local programming	
Fox	Fall	Bones (27/7.0) (Tied with The Bachelor)		Fringe		Local programming	
Fox	Winter	**Million Dollar Money Drop**		Bones (27/7.0) (Tied with The Bachelor)		Local programming	
Fox	Mid-winter	American Idol (3/13.4)		Bones (27/7.0) (Tied with The Bachelor)		Local programming	
Fox	Spring	American Idol (3/13.4)		Bones (27/7.0) (Tied with The Bachelor)		Local programming	
Fox	Summer	So You Think You Can Dance		Glee (R)		Local programming	
NBC	Fall	Community	30 Rock	The Office	**Outsourced**	The Apprentice	
NBC	Winter	Community	**Perfect Couples**	The Office	Parks and Recreation	30 Rock	**Outsourced**
NBC	Spring	Community	**The Paul Reiser Show**	The Office	Parks and Recreation	30 Rock	**Outsourced**
NBC	Mid-spring	Community	The Office (R)	The Office	Parks and Recreation	30 Rock	**Outsourced**
NBC	Summer	Community	30 Rock (R)	The Office	Parks and Recreation	**Love Bites**	
NBC	Mid-summer	Community	Parks and Recreation (R)	The Office	30 Rock (R)	**Love Bites**	
NBC	Late summer	Community	Parks and Recreation (R)	The Office	30 Rock (R)	Law & Order: Special Victims Unit (R)	

== Friday ==
Network		8:00 p.m.	8:30 p.m.	9:00 p.m.	9:30 p.m.	10:00 p.m.	10:30 p.m.
ABC	Fall	Supernanny		Primetime		20/20	
ABC	Winter	Supernanny		Primetime		20/20	
ABC	Spring	Shark Tank		Primetime		20/20	
ABC	Summer	Shark Tank		Primetime		20/20	
CBS	Fall	Medium		CSI: NY		**Blue Bloods** (14/8.0) (Tied with The Big Bang Theory)	
CBS	Winter	**The Defenders**		CSI: NY		Criminal Minds	
CBS	Mid-winter	**The Defenders**		CSI: NY		**Blue Bloods** (14/8.0) (Tied with The Big Bang Theory)	
CBS	Spring	**CHAOS**		CSI: NY		**Blue Bloods** (14/8.0) (Tied with The Big Bang Theory)	
CBS	Mid-spring	Flashpoint		CSI: NY		**Blue Bloods** (14/8.0) (Tied with The Big Bang Theory)	
CBS	Summer	Flashpoint		CSI: NY		**Blue Bloods** (14/8.0) (Tied with The Big Bang Theory)	
The CW	Fall	Smallville		Supernatural		Local programming	
The CW	Winter	Smallville		Supernatural		Local programming	
The CW	Spring	Smallville		Supernatural		Local programming	
The CW	Summer	**Nikita** (R)		Supernatural		Local programming	
Fox	Fall	House (R)		The Good Guys		Local programming	
Fox	Winter	Kitchen Nightmares		Fringe		Local programming	
Fox	Spring	Kitchen Nightmares		Fringe		Local programming	
Fox	Summer	Bones (R)		House (R)		Local programming	
NBC	Fall	Dateline NBC				**Outlaw**	
NBC	Mid-fall	**School Pride**		Dateline NBC			
NBC	Winter	Who Do You Think You Are?		Dateline NBC			
NBC	Spring	Friday Night Lights (R)		Dateline NBC			
NBC	Summer	**Friends with Benefits**		Dateline NBC			

== Saturday ==
Network		8:00 p.m.	8:30 p.m.	9:00 p.m.	9:30 p.m.	10:00 p.m.	10:30 p.m.
ABC	Fall	Saturday Night Football (continued to game completion)					
ABC	Winter	ABC Saturday Movie of the Week					
ABC	Spring	ABC Saturday Movie of the Week					
ABC	Summer	ABC Saturday Movie of the Week					
CBS		Crimetime Saturday				48 Hours	
Fox	Fall	COPS	COPS (R)	America's Most Wanted		Local programming	
Fox	Winter	COPS	COPS (R)	America's Most Wanted		Local programming	
Fox	Spring	Fox Sports programming				Local programming	
Fox	Late spring	COPS	COPS (R)	America's Most Wanted		Local programming	
Fox	Summer	COPS	COPS (R)	Family Guy (R)	The Cleveland Show (R)	Local programming	
Fox	Late summer	COPS	COPS (R)	American Dad! (R)	The Cleveland Show (R)		
NBC	Fall	**Law & Order: LA** (R)		**Chase** (R)		Law & Order: Special Victims Unit (R)	
NBC	Mid-fall	**Outlaw** (R)		**Law & Order: LA** (R)		Law & Order: Special Victims Unit (R)	
NBC	Winter	**Chase** (R)		**Law & Order: LA** (R)		Law & Order: Special Victims Unit (R)	
NBC	Mid-winter	**Harry's Law** (R)		**Law & Order: LA** (R)		Law & Order: Special Victims Unit (R)	
NBC	Spring	**Chase**		**Law & Order: LA** (R)		Law & Order: Special Victims Unit (R)	
NBC	Summer	**Chase**		**Law & Order: LA** (R)		Law & Order: Special Victims Unit (R)	

== By network ==
=== ABC ===
**Returning series**

- 20/20
- ABC Saturday Movie of the Week
- America's Funniest Home Videos
- The Bachelor
- Bachelor Pad
- The Bachelorette
- Brothers & Sisters
- Castle
- Cougar Town
- Dancing with the Stars
- Desperate Housewives
- Extreme Makeover: Home Edition
- Grey's Anatomy
- Jamie Oliver's Food Revolution
- The Middle
- Modern Family
- Primetime
- Primetime: What Would You Do?
- Private Practice
- Rookie Blue
- Saturday Night Football
- Secret Millionaire (moved from Fox)
- Shark Tank
- Supernanny
- V
- Wipeout

**New series**

- **101 Ways to Leave a Game Show** *
- **Better with You**
- **Body of Proof** *
- **Combat Hospital** *
- **Detroit 1-8-7**
- **Expedition Impossible** *
- **Extreme Makeover: Weight Loss Edition** *
- **Happy Endings** *
- **Mr. Sunshine** *
- **My Generation**
- **No Ordinary Family**
- **Off the Map** *
- **Skating with the Stars**
- **Take the Money and Run** *
- **The Whole Truth**

Not returning from 2009–10:

- Better Off Ted
- Dating in the Dark
- The Deep End
- Defying Gravity
- Downfall
- Eastwick
- Find My Family
- FlashForward
- The Forgotten
- The Gates
- Hank
- Happy Town
- Lost
- Romantically Challenged
- Scoundrels
- Scrubs (returned for 2025–26)
- Shaq Vs.
- True Beauty
- Ugly Betty
- Wife Swap

=== CBS ===
**Returning series**

- 48 Hours Mystery
- 60 Minutes
- The Amazing Race
- The Big Bang Theory
- Criminal Minds
- CSI: Crime Scene Investigation
- CSI: Miami
- CSI: NY
- Flashpoint
- The Good Wife
- How I Met Your Mother
- Medium
- The Mentalist
- NCIS
- NCIS: Los Angeles
- Rules of Engagement
- Survivor
- Two and a Half Men
- Undercover Boss

**New series**

- $#*! My Dad Says
- **Blue Bloods**
- **CHAOS** *
- **Criminal Minds: Suspect Behavior** *
- **The Defenders**
- **Hawaii Five-0**
- **Live to Dance** *
- **Mad Love** *
- **Mike & Molly**
- **Same Name** *

Not returning from 2009–10:

- Accidentally on Purpose
- Cold Case
- Gary Unmarried
- Ghost Whisperer
- Miami Medical
- The New Adventures of Old Christine
- Numb3rs
- Three Rivers

=== The CW ===
**Returning series**

- 90210
- America's Next Top Model
- Gossip Girl
- Life Unexpected
- One Tree Hill
- Smallville
- Supernatural
- The Vampire Diaries

**New series**

- **Hellcats**
- **Nikita**
- **Shedding for the Wedding** *

Not returning from 2009–10:

- The Beautiful Life: TBL (Moved to YouTube)
- Fly Girls
- High Society
- Hitched or Ditched
- Melrose Place

=== Fox ===
**Returning series**

- America's Most Wanted
- American Dad!
- American Idol
- Bones
- The Cleveland Show
- Cops
- Family Guy
- Fringe
- Glee
- The Good Guys
- Hell's Kitchen
- House
- Human Target
- Kitchen Nightmares
- Lie to Me
- NFL on Fox
- The OT
- The Simpsons
- So You Think You Can Dance

**New series**

- **Bob's Burgers** *
- **Breaking In** *
- **Buried Treasure**
- **The Chicago Code** *
- **Lone Star**
- **Million Dollar Money Drop**
- **Mobbed** *
- **Raising Hope**
- **Running Wilde**
- **Traffic Light** *

Not returning from 2009–10:

- 24 (returned as a limited series in 2013–14)
- Brothers
- Dollhouse
- Past Life
- Sons of Tucson
- 'Til Death

=== NBC ===
**Returning series**

- 30 Rock
- America's Got Talent
- The Apprentice
- The Biggest Loser
- Chuck
- Community
- Dateline NBC
- Football Night in America
- Law & Order: Special Victims Unit
- The Marriage Ref
- Minute to Win It
- NHL on NBC
- NBC Sunday Night Football
- The Office
- Parenthood
- Parks and Recreation
- The Sing-Off
- Who Do You Think You Are?

**New series**

- **America's Next Great Restaurant** *
- **The Cape** *
- **Chase**
- **The Event**
- **Friends with Benefits** *
- **Harry's Law** *
- **It's Worth What?** *
- **Law & Order: LA**
- **Love Bites** *
- **Love in the Wild** *
- **Outlaw**
- **Outsourced**
- **The Paul Reiser Show** *
- **Perfect Couples** *
- **School Pride**
- **Undercovers**
- **The Voice** *

Not returning from 2009–10:

- 100 Questions
- Heroes
- The Jay Leno Show
- Law & Order (returned for 2021–22)
- Mercy
- Trauma

== Renewals and cancellations ==
=== Full season pickups ===
==== ABC ====
- Better With You – On October 25, 2010, ABC ordered a full 22-episode season of the series.
- Brothers & Sisters – On October 14, 2010, ABC ordered 4 additional scripts for the series. and then on October 25, 2010, ABC ordered a full 22-episode season.
- Detroit 1-8-7 – Picked up for 5 additional episodes for an 18-episode season on October 25, 2010.
- No Ordinary Family – On October 14, 2010, ABC ordered 4 additional scripts for the series, and then on October 25, 2010, ABC ordered a full 22-episode season.
- Off the Map – On October 14, 2010, ABC ordered 1 additional script for the series. On October 26, 2010, they ordered an additional 5 scripts, bringing the series order to 7 episodes plus 6 scripts.

==== CBS ====
- $#*! My Dad Says – On October 21, 2010, CBS ordered a 19-episode season of the series plus 3 additional scripts.
- Blue Bloods – On October 21, 2010, CBS ordered a full 22-episode season of the series.
- The Defenders – On October 21, 2010, CBS ordered a 19-episode season of the series plus 3 additional scripts.
- Hawaii Five-0 – On October 21, 2010, CBS ordered a full 22-episode season of the series.
- Mike & Molly – On October 21, 2010, CBS ordered a full 22-episode season of the series.

==== The CW ====
- Hellcats – On September 23, 2010, The CW ordered 6 additional scripts for the series and then on October 22, 2010, The CW ordered a full 22-episode season of the series.
- Nikita – On October 22, 2010, The CW Ordered a full 22-episode season of the series.
- One Tree Hill – On September 23, 2010, The CW ordered 6 additional scripts for the series and then on October 22, 2010, The CW ordered a full 22-episode season of the series.

==== Fox ====
- Human Target – On October 22, 2010, FOX ordered 2 additional scripts for the series.
- Raising Hope – On October 6, 2010, the show was given a full 22-episode season, making it the first new show to ever get a full season order.

==== NBC ====
- Chase – Picked up for a full 22-episode season on October 19, 2010, although this was later reduced to 18 episodes.
- Chuck – Picked up for a 24-episode season October 19, 2010.
- Community – On November 3, 2010, NBC ordered 2 additional episodes, bringing its current season to 24 episodes.
- The Event – Picked up for a full 22-episode season on October 18, 2010.
- Law & Order: LA – Picked up for a full 22-episode season on October 18, 2010.
- Outsourced – Picked up for a full 22-episode season on October 18, 2010.

=== Renewals ===
==== ABC ====
- 20/20 – Announced on the fall schedule on May 17, 2011.
- America's Funniest Home Videos – Announced on the fall schedule on May 17, 2011.
- The Bachelor – Picked up for a sixteenth season on March 14, 2011.
- The Bachelorette – Picked up for a seventh season on March 14, 2011.
- Body of Proof – Picked up for a second season on May 13, 2011.
- Castle – Picked up for a fourth season on January 10, 2011.
- Cougar Town – Picked up for a third season on January 10, 2011.
- Dancing with the Stars– Announced on the fall schedule for a thirteenth season on May 17, 2011.
- Desperate Housewives– Announced on the fall schedule for an eighth season on May 17, 2011.
- Extreme Makeover: Home Edition– Announced on the fall schedule for a ninth season on May 17, 2011.
- Grey's Anatomy – Picked up for an eighth season on January 10, 2011.
- Happy Endings – Picked up for a second season on May 13, 2011.
- The Middle – Picked up for a third season on January 10, 2011.
- Modern Family – Picked up for a third season on January 10, 2011.
- Private Practice – Picked up for a fifth season on January 10, 2011.
- Secret Millionaire – Picked up for a third season on May 13, 2011.
- Shark Tank – Picked up for a third season on May 13, 2011.

==== CBS ====
- 48 Hours Mystery – Announced on the 2011/12 schedule for May 18, 2011.
- 60 Minutes – Announced on the 2011/12 schedule for on May 18, 2011.
- The Amazing Race – Picked up for a nineteenth season on March 28, 2011.
- The Big Bang Theory – Picked up for three additional seasons on January 12, 2011, running through its seventh season in 2013/14.
- Blue Bloods – Picked up for a second season on May 15, 2011.
- Criminal Minds – Announced on the 2011/12 schedule for a seventh season on May 18, 2011.
- CSI: Crime Scene Investigation – Announced on the 2011/12 schedule for a twelfth season on May 18, 2011.
- CSI: Miami – Announced on the 2011/12 schedule for a tenth season on May 18, 2011.
- CSI: NY – Picked up for an eighth season on May 17, 2011.
- The Good Wife – Announced on the 2011/12 schedule for a third season on May 18, 2011.
- Hawaii Five-0 – Picked up for a second season on May 15, 2011.
- How I Met Your Mother – Picked up for two additional seasons on March 4, 2011, running through its eighth season in 2012/13.
- The Mentalist – Announced on the 2011/12 schedule for a fourth season on May 18, 2011.
- Mike & Molly – Picked up for a second season on May 15, 2011.
- NCIS – Picked up for a ninth season on February 2, 2011.
- NCIS: Los Angeles – Announced on the 2011/12 schedule for a third season on May 18, 2011.
- Rules of Engagement – Picked up for a sixth season on May 17, 2011.
- Survivor – Picked up for two additional seasons on March 9, 2011.
- Two and a Half Men – Previously picked for an eighth and ninth season, but the show's eighth season was speculative after the firing of its star Charlie Sheen. However, CBS and Warner Bros. officially announced that Ashton Kutcher would join the cast as Sheen's replacement for the ninth season.
- Undercover Boss – Picked up for a third season on March 28, 2011.

==== The CW ====
- 90210 – Picked up for a fourth season on April 26, 2011.
- America's Next Top Model – Picked up for two more cycles in the 2011/12 season on April 26, 2011.
- Gossip Girl – Picked up for a fifth season on April 26, 2011.
- Nikita – Picked up for a second season on May 17, 2011.
- One Tree Hill – Picked up for a ninth season on May 17, 2011.
- Supernatural – Picked up for a seventh season on April 26, 2011.
- The Vampire Diaries – Picked up for a third season on April 26, 2011.

==== Fox ====
- America's Most Wanted - Scheduled to air as two-hour monthly specials for the 2011/12 TV season.
- American Dad! – Picked up through the 2012/13 television season (seventh and eighth season) on February 23, 2011.
- American Idol – Details for the season eleven auditions were announced on May 5, 2011.
- Bob's Burgers – Picked up for a second season on April 7, 2011.
- Breaking In – Picked up for a second season on August 24, 2011.
- Bones – Picked up for a seventh season on May 3, 2011.
- The Cleveland Show – Picked up for a third season on June 10, 2010.
- Family Guy – Picked up in 2008 through at least 2012.
- Fringe – Picked up for a fourth season of 22 episodes on March 24, 2011.
- Glee – Picked up for a third season on May 23, 2010.
- House – Picked up for an eighth and final season on May 10, 2011.
- Mobbed – Picked up for eight episodes on April 1, 2011, after a successful special debut.
- Raising Hope – Picked up for a second season on January 11, 2011.
- The Simpsons – Picked up for a twenty-third season on November 11, 2010.

==== NBC ====
- 30 Rock – Picked up for a sixth season on November 15, 2010.
- The Biggest Loser – Picked up for a twelfth season on February 22, 2011.
- Celebrity Apprentice – Announced as being on NBC's fall schedule on May 15, 2011.
- Chuck – Picked up for a fifth and final season of 13 episodes on May 13, 2011.
- Community – Picked up for a third season on March 17, 2011.
- Harry's Law – Picked up for a second season on May 12, 2011.
- Law & Order: Special Victims Unit – Announced as being on NBC's fall schedule for a 13th season on May 15, 2011 after departure of its star-Christopher Meloni.
- The Office – Picked up for an eighth season on March 17, 2011.
- Parenthood – Picked up for a third season on May 12, 2011.
- Parks and Recreation – Picked up for a fourth season on March 17, 2011.
- The Sing-Off – Picked up for a third season on February 22, 2011.
- The Voice – Announced as being on NBC's fall schedule for a 2nd season on May 15, 2011.
- Who Do You Think You Are? – Picked up for a third season on February 22, 2011.

=== Cancellations/Series endings ===
==== ABC ====
- Better With You – Canceled on May 13, 2011.
- Brothers & Sisters – Canceled on May 13, 2011, after five seasons.
- Detroit 1-8-7 – Canceled on May 13, 2011.
- Jamie Oliver's Food Revolution - Canceled on June 24, 2011, after two seasons.
- Mr. Sunshine – Canceled on May 13, 2011.
- My Generation – Canceled on October 1, 2010, after two episodes.
- No Ordinary Family – Canceled on May 13, 2011.
- Off the Map – Canceled on May 13, 2011.
- Skating with the Stars – ABC announced the show will not have a second season.
- Supernanny – Jo Frost announced on November 7, 2010, that she is leaving the show to start a family of her own, thus ending the series' run after seven seasons.
- V – Canceled on May 13, 2011, after two seasons.
- The Whole Truth – Canceled on October 25, 2010.

==== CBS ====
- $#*! My Dad Says – Canceled on May 15, 2011.
- CHAOS – Canceled on April 18, 2011, after three episodes.
- Criminal Minds: Suspect Behavior – Canceled on May 17, 2011.
- The Defenders – Canceled on May 15, 2011.
- Flashpoint – CBS will pick up 7 of the 18 episodes from Season 4 to air with the 6 unaired Season 3 segments for a 13-episode run during the summer. Soon after that, ION is expected to begin airing all 51 episodes of the show that will have aired on CBS. Additionally, ION will premiere the remaining 11 episodes of Flashpoint's fourth season.
- Live to Dance – Due to dismal ratings, it was announced that the show will not return for a second season.
- Mad Love – Canceled on May 15, 2011.
- Medium – Canceled on November 18, 2010, after seven seasons. The series has been concluded on January 21, 2011.

==== The CW ====
- Hellcats – Canceled on May 17, 2011.
- Life Unexpected – The show's cancellation was confirmed when Warner Brothers chose to release both seasons of the show on DVD. The series ended on January 18, 2011.
- Smallville – It was announced on March 4, 2010, that season ten would be the final season. The series has been concluded on May 13, 2011.

==== Fox ====
- America's Most Wanted - Canceled on May 16, 2011, after twenty-four seasons. The series moved to Lifetime for its twenty-fifth season. On January 22, 2021, it was announced that the series would return for a twenty-sixth season.
- The Chicago Code – Canceled on May 10, 2011.
- The Good Guys – Fox announced the show will not have a second season.
- Human Target – Canceled on May 10, 2011.
- Lie to Me – Canceled on May 10, 2011, after three seasons.
- Lone Star – Canceled on September 28, 2010, after airing only two episodes. This was the first cancellation of the season.
- Million Dollar Money Drop – Canceled on August 5, 2011.
- Running Wilde – The show was pulled from November sweeps, with the remaining episodes to air through December. On November 30, 2010 FOX announced that no new episodes would be ordered.
- Traffic Light – Canceled on May 10, 2011.

==== NBC ====
- America's Next Great Restaurant – Canceled on May 13, 2011.
- The Cape – The show was officially canceled on March 2, 2011, due to low ratings. At that time, only 9 out of 10 episodes have aired as NBC announced the series finale would be aired on their website.
- Chase – Officially placed on hiatus on February 3, 2011, and eventually canceled. The remaining five episodes were burned off on Saturdays through April 23, 2011.
- The Event – Canceled on May 13, 2011.
- Friday Night Lights – The fifth season premiered on April 15, 2011, after ending the series broadcast on DirecTV's owned The 101 Network. The series finale aired on July 8, 2011.
- Law & Order: LA – Canceled on May 13, 2011.
- Outlaw – Canceled on October 11, 2010.
- Outsourced – Canceled on May 13, 2011.
- The Paul Reiser Show – Canceled on April 22, 2011, after two episodes.
- Perfect Couples – Canceled on May 13, 2011. It was placed on hiatus, then canceled and replaced by The Paul Reiser Show on April 14, 2011, with two episodes left to air.
- School Pride – Canceled on May 13, 2011.
- Undercovers – Canceled on November 4, 2010, after seven episodes.

== See also ==
- 2010–11 United States network television schedule (daytime)
- 2010–11 United States network television schedule (late night)

== Top weekly ratings ==
- Data sources: AC Nielsen, TV by the Numbers

=== Total Viewers ===
Week	Name	Viewers (in millions)	Network
August 30-September 5	America's Got Talent 8/31	11.50	NBC
September 6-September 12	NFL Thursday Night Opener: Minnesota Vikings at New Orleans Saints	27.49	NBC
September 13-September 19	Sunday Night Football: New York Giants at Indianapolis Colts	23.10	NBC
September 20-September 26	Dancing with the Stars 9/20	21.29	ABC
September 27-October 3	Dancing with the Stars 9/27	21.34	ABC
October 4-October 10	Dancing with the Stars 10/4	19.89	ABC
October 11-October 17	Dancing with the Stars 10/11	19.53	ABC
October 18-October 24	Sunday Night Football: Minnesota Vikings at Green Bay Packers	25.68	NBC
October 25-October 31	Dancing with the Stars 10/25	20.41	ABC
November 1-November 7	Dancing with the Stars 11/1	19.93	ABC
November 8-November 14	Sunday Night Football: New England Patriots at Pittsburgh Steelers	21.18	NBC
November 15-November 21	Sunday Night Football: New York Giants at Philadelphia Eagles	23.20	NBC
November 22-November 28	Dancing with the Stars 11/23	24.20	ABC
November 29-December 5	Sunday Night Football: Pittsburgh Steelers at Baltimore Ravens	22.51	NBC
December 6-December 12	Sunday Night Football: Philadelphia Eagles at Dallas Cowboys	25.73	NBC
December 13-December 19	Sunday Night Football: Green Bay Packers at New England Patriots	24.17	NBC
December 20-December 26	NCIS (Repeat)	12.25	CBS
December 27-January 2	NFL Tuesday Night Special: Minnesota Vikings at Philadelphia Eagles	23.74	NBC
January 3-January 9	AFC Wild Card Playoff: New York Jets at Indianapolis Colts	33.35	NBC
January 10-January 16	AFC Divisional Playoff: New York Jets at New England Patriots Postgame	31.24	CBS
January 17-January 23	AFC Championship Game: New York Jets at Pittsburgh Steelers	54.85	CBS
January 24-January 30	American Idol 1/26	25.33	FOX
January 31-February 6	Super Bowl XLV: Pittsburgh Steelers vs. Green Bay Packers	111.01	FOX
February 7-February 13	53rd Grammy Awards	26.67	CBS
February 14-February 20	American Idol 2/16	23.20	FOX
February 21-February 27	83rd Academy Awards	37.92	ABC
February 28-March 6	American Idol 3/3	25.26	FOX
March 7-March 13	American Idol 3/9	24.40	FOX
March 14-March 20	American Idol 3/16	22.58	FOX
March 21-March 27	American Idol 3/23	23.95	FOX
March 28-April 3	American Idol 3/30	24.18	FOX
April 4-April 10	American Idol 4/6	23.13	FOX
April 11-April 17	American Idol 4/13	23.03	FOX
April 18-April 24	American Idol 4/20	22.54	FOX
April 25-May 1	Dancing With The Stars 4/25	22.38	ABC
May 2-May 8	Dancing with the Stars 5/2	21.40	ABC
May 9-May 15	American Idol 5/11	23.05	FOX
May 16-May 22	American Idol 5/18	23.56	FOX
May 23-May 29	American Idol 5/25	29.29	FOX
May 30-June 5	2011 NBA Finals Game 2: Dallas Mavericks at Miami Heat	15.52	ABC
June 6-June 12	2011 NBA Finals Game 6: Dallas Mavericks at Miami Heat	23.88	ABC
June 13-June 19	America's Got Talent 6/14	12.59	NBC
June 20-June 26	America's Got Talent 6/22	13.50	NBC
June 27-July 3	America's Got Talent 6/29	13.71	NBC
July 4-July 10	America's Got Talent 7/5	15.78	NBC
July 11-July 17	America's Got Talent 7/12	14.07	NBC
July 18-July 24	America's Got Talent 7/19	13.04	NBC
July 25-July 31	America's Got Talent 7/26	11.54	NBC
August 1-August 7	America's Got Talent 8/2	11.92	NBC
August 8-August 14	America's Got Talent 8/9	11.46	NBC
August 15-August 21	NFL Preseason Special: San Diego Chargers at Dallas Cowboys	10.68	NBC
August 22-August 28	America's Got Talent 8/23	11.99	NBC

=== 18-49 Viewers ===
Week	Name	Viewers (in millions)	Network
August 30-September 5	America's Got Talent 8/31	3.0	NBC
September 6-September 12	NFL Thursday Night Opener: Minnesota Vikings at New Orleans Saints	10.7	NBC
September 13-September 19	Sunday Night Football: New York Giants at Indianapolis Colts	9.2	NBC
September 20-September 26	Sunday Night Football: New York Jets at Miami Dolphins	7.3	NBC
September 27-October 3	Sunday Night Football: Chicago Bears at New York Giants	8.0	NBC
October 4-October 10	Sunday Night Football: Philadelphia Eagles at San Francisco 49ers	6.7	NBC
October 11-October 17	Sunday Night Football: Indianapolis Colts at Washington Redskins	7.4	NBC
October 18-October 24	Sunday Night Football: Minnesota Vikings at Green Bay Packers	9.8	NBC
October 25-October 31	Sunday Night Football: Pittsburgh Steelers at New Orleans Saints	7.3	NBC
November 1-November 7	Sunday Night Football: Dallas Cowboys at Green Bay Packers	7.4	NBC
November 8-November 14	Sunday Night Football: New England Patriots at Pittsburgh Steelers	8.1	NBC
November 15-November 21	Sunday Night Football: New York Giants at Philadelphia Eagles	8.8	NBC
November 22-November 28	Sunday Night Football: San Diego Chargers at Indianapolis Colts	7.1	NBC
November 29-December 5	Sunday Night Football: Pittsburgh Steelers at Baltimore Ravens	8.3	NBC
December 6-December 12	Sunday Night Football: Philadelphia Eagles at Dallas Cowboys	9.5	NBC
December 13-December 19	Sunday Night Football: Green Bay Packers at New England Patriots	8.6	NBC
December 20-December 26	The OT	4.2	FOX
December 27-January 2	NFL Tuesday Night Special: Minnesota Vikings at Philadelphia Eagles	8.1	NBC
January 3-January 9	AFC Wild Card Playoff: New York Jets at Indianapolis Colts	11.8	NBC
January 10-January 16	NFC Divisional Playoff: Green Bay Packers at Atlanta Falcons	11.2	FOX
January 17-January 23	AFC Championship Game: New York Jets at Pittsburgh Steelers	19.7	CBS
January 24-January 30	American Idol 1/26	9.2	FOX
January 31-February 6	Super Bowl XLV: Pittsburgh Steelers vs. Green Bay Packers	39.9	FOX
February 7-February 13	53rd Grammy Awards	10.0	CBS
February 14-February 20	American Idol 2/16	8.2	FOX
February 21-February 27	83rd Academy Awards	11.8	ABC
February 28-March 6	American Idol 3/3	8.2	FOX
March 7-March 13	American Idol 3/9	8.1	FOX
March 14-March 20	American Idol 3/16	7.6	FOX
March 21-March 27	American Idol 3/23	7.9	FOX
March 28-April 3	American Idol 3/30	7.7	FOX
April 4-April 10	American Idol 4/6	7.3	FOX
April 11-April 17	American Idol 4/13	7.3	FOX
April 18-April 24	American Idol 4/20	7.1	FOX
April 25-May 1	American Idol 4/27	7.1	FOX
May 2-May 8	American Idol 5/4	6.6	FOX
May 9-May 15	American Idol 5/11	7.1	FOX
May 16-May 22	American Idol 5/18	7.4	FOX
May 23-May 29	American Idol 5/25	9.2	FOX
May 30-June 5	2011 NBA Finals Game 1: Dallas Mavericks at Miami Heat	6.5	ABC
June 6-June 12	2011 NBA Finals Game 6: Dallas Mavericks at Miami Heat	9.7	ABC
June 13-June 19	The Voice	4.6	NBC
June 20-June 26	The Voice 6/21	4.4	NBC
June 27-July 3	The Voice 6/28	4.4	NBC
July 4-July 10	America's Got Talent 7/5	4.6	NBC
July 11-July 17	America's Got Talent 7/12	4.0	NBC
July 18-July 24	America's Got Talent 7/19	3.6	NBC
July 25-July 31	America's Got Talent 7/26	3.1	NBC
August 1-August 7	America's Got Talent 8/2	3.1	NBC
August 8-August 14	America's Got Talent 8/9	3.0	NBC
August 15-August 21	NFL Preseason Football: San Diego Chargers at Dallas Cowboys	3.7	NBC
August 22-August 28	America's Got Talent 8/23	3.3	NBC
