= Top-rated United States television programs of 2010–11 =

This table displays the top-rated primetime television series of the 2010–11 season as measured by Nielsen Media Research.

| Rank | Program | Network | Rating |
|---|---|---|---|
| 1 | American Idol — Wednesday | FOX | 14.5 |
| 2 | Dancing with the Stars | ABC | 13.8 |
| 3 | American Idol — Thursday | FOX | 13.4 |
| 4 | Sunday Night Football | NBC | 12.7 |
| 5 | NCIS | CBS | 11.8 |
| 5 | Dancing with the Stars — Results | ABC | 11.8 |
| 7 | NCIS: Los Angeles | CBS | 10.1 |
| 8 | The Mentalist | CBS | 9.6 |
| 9 | Body of Proof | ABC | 9.0 |
| 10 | Criminal Minds | CBS | 8.7 |
| 11 | The Good Wife | CBS | 8.5 |
| 12 | 60 Minutes | CBS | 8.4 |
| 12 | CSI: Crime Scene Investigation | CBS | 8.4 |
| 14 | The Big Bang Theory | CBS | 8.0 |
| 14 | Blue Bloods | CBS | 8.0 |
| 16 | Two and a Half Men | CBS | 7.7 |
| 17 | The Voice | NBC | 7.5 |
| 17 | Hawaii Five-0 | CBS | 7.5 |
| 17 | Desperate Housewives | ABC | 7.5 |
| 17 | Grey's Anatomy | ABC | 7.5 |
| 21 | Survivor | CBS | 7.4 |
| 22 | Harry's Law | NBC | 7.3 |
| 22 | CSI: Miami | CBS | 7.3 |
| 22 | Castle | ABC | 7.3 |
| 25 | Undercover Boss | CBS | 7.1 |
| 25 | Modern Family | ABC | 7.1 |
| 27 | The Bachelor | ABC | 7.0 |
| 27 | Bones | FOX | 7.0 |
| 29 | Criminal Minds: Suspect Behavior | CBS | 6.9 |
| 29 | Mike & Molly | CBS | 6.9 |
