= Yu-Gi-Oh! Trading Card Game =

Trading card game

- Backside of an English-language Yu-Gi-Oh! Trading Card Game card.
- Alternative names: Yu-Gi-Oh! Official Card Game
- Named variant: Yu-Gi-Oh! Rush Duel
- Publishers: Japan and SEA: Konami Digital Entertainment; North America and Europe: Upper Deck (2002–2008); Konami Digital Entertainment (2008–present); South Korea: Daewon; China: Shanghai Windo Entertainment
- Release date: February 4, 1999; 27 years ago
- Players: 2 (1 vs. 1)
- Age range: OCG: 12 and up (1999–2015); 9 and up (2015–present); TCG: 6 and up
- Cards: 40 to 60 (Main Deck) ≤15 (Extra Deck) ≤15 (Side Deck)
- Playing time: 50 minutes
- Website: yugioh-card.com

The Yu-Gi-Oh! Trading Card Game (Note: Yu-Gi-Oh! Official Card Game (遊☆戯☆王オフィシャルカードゲーム, Yū☆Gi☆Ō Ofisharu Kādo Gēmu) in Asia.) is a collectible card game developed and published by Konami Digital Entertainment, based on the manga series Yu-Gi-Oh! created by Kazuki Takahashi and Studio Dice. The card game is based on the fictional game of Duel Monsters (originally known as Magic & Wizards), which appears in portions of the manga series and is the central plot device throughout its various anime adaptations and spinoff series.

As the Official Card Game (OCG), it was launched by Konami in 1999 in Japan. It was later launched in March 2002 in North America, where it was originally sold under license by the Upper Deck Company until they lost rights in 2009. It was named the top-selling trading card game in the world by Guinness World Records on July 7, 2009, having sold over 22 billion cards worldwide. As of March 31, 2011, Konami Digital Entertainment Co., Ltd. Japan sold 25.2 billion cards globally since 1999. As of January 2021, the game is estimated to have sold about 35 billion cards worldwide. Yu-Gi-Oh! Speed Duel, a faster and simplified alternate format, was launched worldwide in January 2019. Another faster-paced variation but with different cards and rules, Yu-Gi-Oh! Rush Duel, launched in Japan in April 2020.

== Gameplay ==
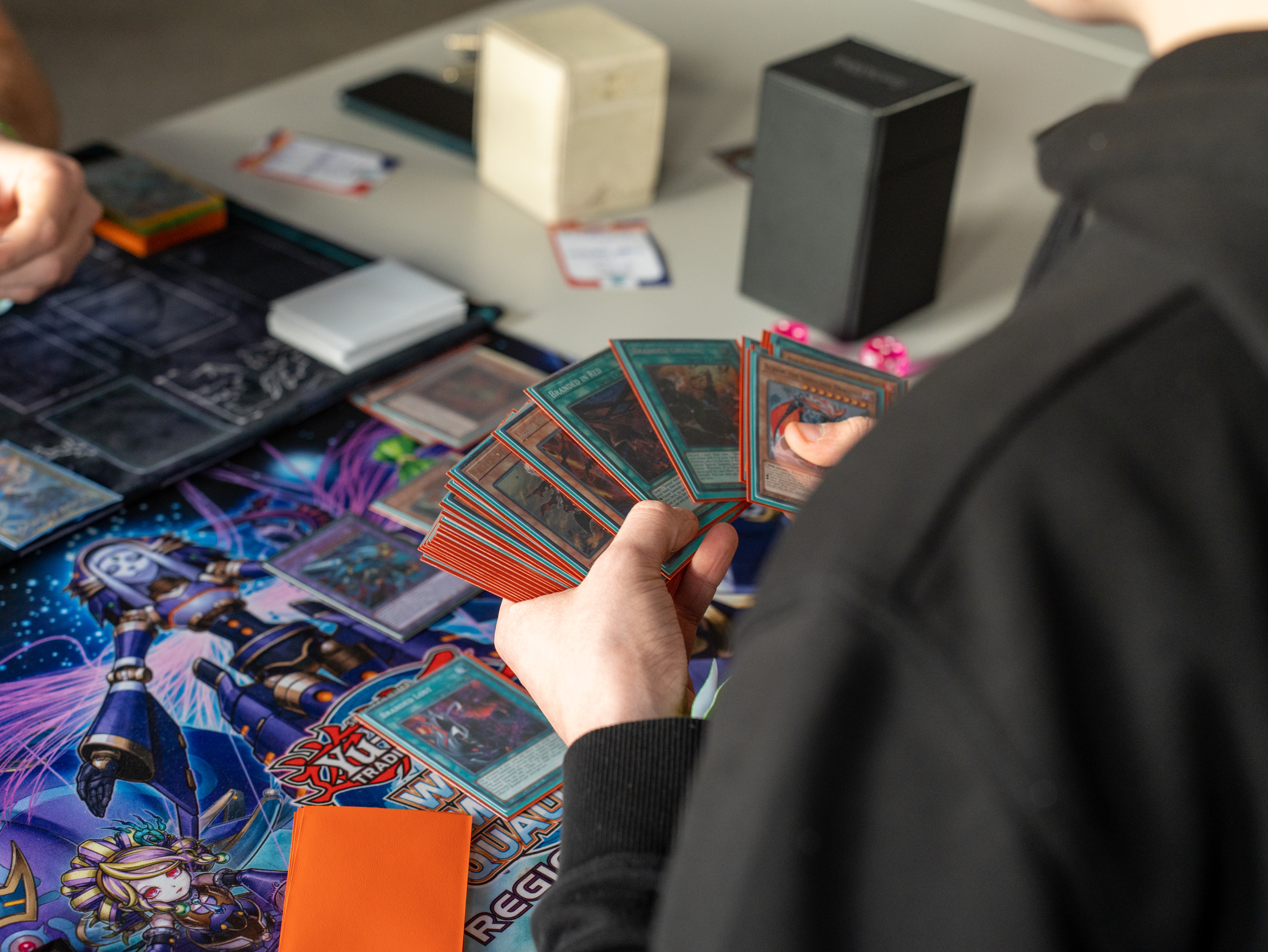
A player looking through their Deck of cards during a Duel

In the Trading Card Game, players draw cards from their respective Decks and take turns playing cards onto the field. Each player uses a Deck containing forty to sixty cards, and an optional "Extra Deck" of up to fifteen cards. There is also an optional fifteen-card Side Deck, which allows players to swap cards from their Main Deck and/or Extra Deck between games. Players are restricted to a maximum of three of each card per Deck and must follow any additional restriction of the format they are playing in. Each player usually starts with 8,000 "Life Points" (LP), though the players can decide to start with a different number in casual games. The main aim of the game is to use monster attacks (and sometimes card effects) to reduce the opponent's Life Points. The game ends upon reaching one of the following conditions:

- When a player's LP reaches 0, That player then loses the Duel.
- When a player runs out of cards in their Main Deck and has to draw, either through their draw phase or by card effect. This is called "Decking Out", and that player loses the Duel.
- When the conditions on certain cards have been met to trigger an automatic win or loss for a particular player (e.g. having all five cards of "Exodia the Forbidden One" in one's hand, or having a monster Summoned by the effect of "Relay Soul" leave the field).
- When a player's Deck Master leaves the field (if playing using "Deck Master" rules).
- When a player surrenders the Duel to their opponent.

If both players trigger a win/lose condition at the same time (e.g. both players' Life Points reach zero), the game ends in a draw.

For beginners, the most practical way to start is with an official Structure Deck or Starter Deck rather than random booster packs, as these provide a coherent strategy, a clear win condition, and a lower barrier to understanding the game's fast pace, chain system, and Extra Deck restrictions under the current Master Rules.

=== Zones ===
In a Duel, cards are usually laid out on a table between the players, or on a playmat with the dedicated zones marked out. They are as follows:

- Main Deck: The Main Deck is placed here face-down. Main Decks may contain anywhere from 40 to 60 cards, which includes Normal, Effect, Ritual, and Pendulum Monsters, as well as Spells and Traps. During a Duel, players may not look through their Main Deck, unless allowed to do so by a card's effect. When that effect resolves, the player must shuffle their Deck.
- Extra Deck: The Extra Deck is placed here face-down (if a player has one). Extra Decks may contain up to 15 cards, consisting of Fusion, Synchro, Xyz, and Link Monsters. Unlike the Main Deck, players may look through their Extra Decks at any time during a Duel to search for and Summon monsters from it, if able. Pendulum Monsters are also placed face-up over the Extra Deck if they would be sent from the field to the Graveyard.
- Graveyard (shortened to GY on card effects only): The Graveyard is where cards are sent to if they are discarded or destroyed. Most monsters which have been Tributed or destroyed by battle are sent to their owner's Graveyard face-up. Spells and Traps are also sent to the Graveyard, once their effects have been resolved. The cards in a player's Graveyard are public knowledge, and may be checked by either player at any time, but the order of the cards in the Graveyard may not be changed. If multiple cards would be sent to the Graveyard, their owner player decides on their order.
- Main Monster Zones: A row of five spaces where Monster Cards are placed when successfully Summoned. Prior to the addition of Link Monsters, any kind of monster could be placed there at any time. After Link Monsters were introduced, monsters from the Extra Deck could only be Special Summoned from the Extra Deck to the Extra Monster Zone, or a Main Monster Zone a Link Monster "points to", up until the rule change for April 2020 onward, where only Link Monsters, and Pendulum Monsters Summoned from the Extra Deck while face-up, follow this restriction.
- Extra Monster Zones: Introduced with Link Monsters, this is a zone where monsters from the Extra Deck can be Summoned. An Extra Monster Zone is not a part of either player's field until they Summon a monster to the Extra Monster Zone, meaning they are shared between the players.
- Spell & Trap Zones: Five spaces in which either Spell or Trap Cards can be placed. The leftmost and rightmost Spell & Trap Zones can optionally be treated as "Pendulum Zones" by placing Pendulum Monsters there, allowing players to use Pendulum Effects and perform Pendulum Summons.
  - The Pendulum Zones previously were their own zones at the left and right sides of the field when introduced, but were integrated into the Spell & Trap Zones with the release of Link Monsters.
- Field Zone: A zone where Field Spell Cards are placed.
- Banished cards: Where cards that are "banished" by card effects are sent. Previously known as "cards removed from play", banished cards are considered out of the game instead of destroyed (though there are some effects that can recover them anyway, and even cards with effects that activate upon being banished), and officially being in no actual zone or location. Because of this, card effects simply refer to it as the "banishment".

=== Phases ===
Each player's turn contains six phases that take place in the following order:

- Draw Phase: The turn player draws one card from their Deck.
- Standby Phase: No specific action occurs, but players may activate or resolve card effects and maintenance costs during this phase.
- Main Phase 1: The turn player may perform any of the following actions:
  - Normal or Tribute Summon a monster in face-up Attack Position (the monster is placed face-up on the field, oriented vertically), or Normal or Tribute Set a monster in face-down Defense Position (the monster is placed face-down on the field, oriented horizontally). The turn player may do either of these only once per turn, unless allowed otherwise by card effects.
  - Change the battle position of a monster Summoned on a previous turn. A face-up Attack Position monster is changed to face-up Defense, but a face-down Defense Position monster is changed to face-up Attack, which constitutes a "Flip Summon".
  - Play Spell Cards from their hand. The turn player may use them on the same turn, or Set them face-down on the field to use at a later time.
  - Set Spell or Trap Cards face-down, for use at a later time.
  - Activate monster effects, or cards that were Set on previous turns.
- Battle Phase: The turn player may choose to attack their opponent, using any monsters on their field that are in Attack Position. Depending on the position of the opponent's monster, the attacking monster's ATK (Attack Points) are taken into account against the opponent's monster's ATK or DEF (Defense Points). The turn player can choose not to conduct their Battle Phase – in this case, they progress straight to the End Phase of their turn.
  - If both monsters are in Attack Position, the monster with fewer ATK is destroyed and its owner takes battle damage equal to the difference between both monster's ATK. The battle damage is subtracted from the owner's LP. If both monsters have the same number of ATK, they are both destroyed, and neither player takes damage. If both monsters have zero ATK, neither monster is destroyed.
  - If the opponent's monster is in Defense Position and has fewer DEF than the attacking monster's ATK, it is destroyed, and its owner takes no battle damage, unless the attacking monster is able to inflict "piercing" battle damage. In the latter case, the defender takes battle damage equal to the difference between the two values.
  - If the opponent's monster is in Defense Position and its DEF are equal to or higher than the attacking monster's ATK, neither monster is destroyed, and the attacker takes battle damage equal to the difference between the two values.
  - Some monsters (such as "Elemental HERO Rampart Blaster" and the "Superheavy Samurai" monsters) may attack in face-up Defense Position. These cards will specify which of their values is used for damage calculation, usually being the DEF.
  - If the defending player controls no monster, or an attacking player's monster has the ability to do so, a player may declare a direct attack on their opponent's LP. The defender loses Life Points equal to the attacking monster's ATK.
  - During the Battle Phase, the number of monsters on the field may change at any time. When this happens before the beginning of the "Damage Step", a replay occurs. During a replay, the attacking player has the choice to continue their attack on their original target, choose a new target, or cancel their attack.
- Main Phase 2: The player may do all the same actions that are available during Main Phase 1, though they cannot Normal Summoning or Set again if they already did so, nor change the battle position of a monster that was Summoned, has battled, or already had their battle position changed during the same turn. This phase is only accessible if the turn player conducted their Battle Phase.
- End Phase: The player declares the end of their turn. Certain card effects and maintenance costs may activate or resolve during this phase. If the turn player has seven or more cards in their hand, they must discard until they have six left, which is known as the "hand size limit".

At the start of a Duel, the player going first does not draw in the Draw Phase nor attack. They may only do so on their subsequent turns.

=== Card Types ===
Gameplay revolves around three types of cards: Monster, Spell, and Trap Cards.

==== Monster Cards ====
Monster Cards represent beings which are Summoned to the field by players to attack opponents and defend themselves. Typical Monster Cards have their name, Attribute, Types, Level, ATK, and DEF printed on them, which may affect the way they interact with other related cards and their effectiveness in a Deck. Most players (in real life, manga, and anime) use Decks that are themed around certain Attributes, Types, or archetypes (words shared in the card names).

The name, Attribute, and Level are printed at the top of the card. The Attribute is a colored sphere with a kanji character inscribed within, which represents an alignment to one of six elements (LIGHT, DARK, EARTH, WATER, FIRE, WIND). The Level is represented by orange and yellow stars aligned to the right of the card; these (roughly) indicate the monster's relative power, and whether it needs Tributes to be played.

The Types are in the middle, between the artwork and effect. The first Type is a general descriptor of the monster's appearance (e.g. Warrior, Machine, Reptile), while the other ones are gameplay-related labels.

ATK and DEF are printed on its bottom-right corner, which determine the monster's offensive and defensive power in battles. These values are used in calculating battle damage (as detailed in the previous section), and may frequently change due to card effects.

Players may Normal Summon or Normal Set one monster per turn, during Main Phase 1 or 2 of their turn. The monster is placed face-up and vertically (if Summoned in Attack Position), or face-down and horizontally (if set in Defense Position), in an available Main Monster Zone. Players may only have up to five monsters in their Main Monster Zone at any time. When a Set monster is attacked, it is flipped face-up and revealed to the other player.

Players may Tribute Summon or Set a monster, by Tributing monsters they control, i.e. sending them to the Graveyard. The number of Tributes required depends on the Level of the monster to be played: Level 5 and 6 monsters need one Tribute, while Level 7 or higher monsters need two Tributes. Some high-Level monsters such as the Egyptian God cards require three Tributes (this is not an inherent requirement of Level 9 or higher monsters, as it is sometimes believed), and cannot be Normal Set. Some monsters cannot be Normal Summoned or Set (even with Tributes), and must be Special Summoned via their stipulated effects.

Players may also Special Summon monsters to the field, using card effects or fulfilling Summoning conditions. These do not count as Normal Summons or Sets, and a player may Special Summon as many monsters as they are able to. Some monsters cannot be Special Summoned, and they can only be Normal or Flip Summoned. Certain monsters located in a player's Extra Deck may only be Special Summoned through unique methods, as listed below.

Players may also perform a Flip Summon during their turn, if they have a monster already Set on their field. The player flips the card over and orients it vertically. This is considered both a Summon and a battle position change, and it does not take up the turn player's Normal Summon for that turn. Some cards cannot be Normal or Special Summoned (such as "Amaterasu"), and must be Set and Flip Summoned.

The game currently features the following types of monsters:

- Normal (yellow): A monster with no effects, instead simply having a description of the monster. Stored in the Main Deck and can be Normal, Tribute, or Special Summoned.
- Effect (orange): A monster that possesses at least one effect. These are stored in the Main Deck, and can be Summoned in the same manner as Normal Monsters unless stated otherwise.
- Ritual (blue): A monster that must be Ritual Summoned. To Ritual Summon, the player must play its corresponding Ritual Spell Card. They then Tribute monsters whose combined Levels are equal to or greater than that of the Ritual Monster (though sometimes exact matching is required), or fulfill other conditions stipulated on the Ritual Spell Card to Summon it. Ritual Monsters are stored in the Main Deck.
- Fusion (purple): A monster that must be Fusion Summoned. To Fusion Summon, the player must use a card or effect that allows for a Fusion Summon, such as the Spell Card "Polymerization", and have the appropriate monsters listed on the Fusion Monster as material in the locations listed by the Spell Card (usually in their hand or on the field). The player then fulfils the conditions on the Fusion Monster to Summon it. Fusion Monsters are stored in a player's Extra Deck, and cannot be returned to a player's hand or Main Deck.
- Synchro (white): A monster that must be Synchro Summoned. To Synchro Summon, the player must use Synchro Materials, i.e. one Tuner monster and any number of non-Tuner monsters on the field, by sending them to the Graveyard. The sum of the Levels of all Synchro Materials must equal the Level of the Synchro Monster. Synchro Monsters are stored in a player's Extra Deck, and cannot be returned to a player's hand or Main Deck.
- Xyz (black): A monster that must be Xyz Summoned. Unlike most other monsters, Xyz Monsters have Ranks as opposed to Levels. To Xyz Summon, the player usually must have at least two monsters whose Levels are the same number as the Xyz Monster's Rank. The player then stacks those monsters in a single zone and the Xyz Monster on top of them, which are referred to as Xyz Materials in the TCG/OCG and "Overlay Units" in the anime and manga. Xyz Monsters usually require their controller to detach (send to the Graveyard) the Xyz Materials to use their own effects, but they may have additional Xyz Materials attached to them with other card effects. Xyz Monsters are stored in a player's Extra Deck, and cannot be returned to a player's hand or Main Deck.
- Pendulum (green gradient with another color): A monster with a special kind of effect known as a "Pendulum Effect". To activate this effect, the monster must be placed into the player's Pendulum Zones, which are the leftmost and rightmost Spell & Trap Zones. While face-up in a player's Pendulum Zones, Pendulum Monsters are treated as Spell Cards that remain on the field, though of no particular Spell type. Pendulum Monsters may also be used to conduct a Pendulum Summon, by having two monsters with "Pendulum Scales" of different values printed on them in both Pendulum Zones. Players may Pendulum Summon once per turn, Special Summoning any monsters from their hand, and face-up Pendulum Monsters from their Extra Deck, whose Levels lie between the two Pendulum Scale values (exclusive). Pendulum Monsters are sent face-up to their owner's Extra Deck instead of being sent from the field to the Graveyard (regardless of what zone they are in), but unless they're also Fusion/Synchro/Xyz Monsters, they start in a player's Main Deck, may be returned to the hand.
- Link (dark blue): A monster with a "Link Rating" and "Link Arrows" (a set of 8 triangles that surround the artwork and can be highlighted in red to point at the adjacent Monster Zones, with the Rating and number of active arrows always being equal) instead of a Level, that must be Link Summoned. To Link Summon, players must send a number of face-up monsters they control (known as Link Material) equal to the Link Rating of the Link Monster they intend to Summon to the Graveyard. The Link Monster is then Summoned to an Extra Monster Zone, or a Main Monster Zone that another Link Monster on the field points to. Link Monsters have no DEF, and hence they cannot be placed in Defense Position; only in face-up Attack Position. Link Monsters themselves can be treated as a number of Link Materials equal to either 1 or their own Link Rating. Aside from guiding Link Summons, Link Monsters often also have effects that interact with monsters in the zones they point to. Link Monsters are stored in a player's Extra Deck, and cannot be returned to a player's hand or Main Deck.
- Token (grey): A "virtual" monster which exclusively exists face-up on the field, and can only be Summoned through specific card effects. Monster Tokens are not included in the Main, Extra, or Side Decks, cannot be changed to face-down Defense Position, and simply vanish from play when removed from the field by any means. They never have effects, and so are considered Normal Monsters. They count towards the five-monster limit on their controller's field but not the rule of three copies, so there can be up to 10 of the same Token on the field. Monster Tokens may be used as Tribute or material for Special Summoning methods (except Xyz Summon, as Xyz Materials are not treated as being on the field), but cannot be used to pay any cost that involve a monster moving to a specific location (they can be banished, as the banishment is not considered a location, but will still disappear permanently since they are leaving the field). Most Monster Tokens do not have physical versions, so players may use any object that can indicate battle position to represent them, and their stats are listed on the cards that Summon them.

There are also certain subtypes of monster with special effects, such as:

- Flip: Flip monsters have effects that activate when they are flipped face-up.
- Union: Union monsters may equip themselves to certain other monsters, granting them special abilities, and then Special Summons themselves back.
- Gemini: Gemini monsters are treated as Normal Monsters when initially Summoned or in the Graveyard. While on the field, their controller may use up one Normal Summon to enable their effects.
- Spirit: Spirit monsters return to their owner's hand during the End Phase of the turn they are Summoned or flipped face-up.
- Tuner: Tuner monsters are required to perform Synchro Summons.

==== Spell Cards ====
Spell Cards (initially known as Magic Cards) are cards with a wide variety of effects. They may be activated directly from a player's hand on their turn, or Set in a player's Spell & Trap Zone to be activated at a later time. Players may use as many Spell Cards as they are able to on their turn, or may choose not to activate any at all. When a Spell Card's effect resolves, or when it is removed from the field, it is usually sent to the Graveyard.

There are six types of Spell Card, distinguished by symbols placed where monsters have Levels:

- Normal: A Spell that can only be played from the hand or Set during Main Phase 1 and 2. Players may activate Normal Spell Cards on the same turn they were Set. They have no symbol.
- Quick-Play: A Spell that may be activated from the turn player's hand, or Set and activated at a later time. Players may activate these Spell Cards from their hand whenever they want during their turn, and if they were Set, at any time on any player's turn except during the turn they were Set. Their symbol resembles a lightning bolt.
- Continuous: A Spell which remains face-up on the field after it is activated. They usually have continuously applying effects that last until they are removed from the field. They have the infinity symbol.
- Equip: A Spell that is equipped to a monster, providing it with one or more effects (such as raising ATK). If the equipped monster leaves the field by any means or is flipped face-down, the Equip Spell is destroyed and sent to the Graveyard. They have a plus-shaped symbol.
- Field: A Spell which that can affect both players. Field Spells have a dedicated zone, the Field Zone, and consequently each player may only have one Field Spell active at a time. However, players are allowed to activate a Field Spell even if they already control one, in which case the old Field Spell is destroyed. They a compass rose symbol.
- Ritual: A Spell that is required to Summon a Ritual Monster. Ritual Spells will stipulate the conditions needed to successfully complete them and Summon the desired monster. Their symbol which resembles a flame.

==== Trap Cards ====
Trap Cards have a variety of effects which may be used to stop or counter the opponent's moves. They must usually be Set on the field, and may be activated at any time after the turn they were, including during an opponent's turn.

There are three types of Trap Cards, also distinguished by symbols:

- Normal: A regular Trap Card. Once its conditions have been fulfilled, it is sent to the Graveyard. No symbol.
- Continuous: A Trap Card which remains on the field once activated. Its effect persists until it leaves the field. They have an infinity symbol.
- Counter: A Trap Card that can only be countered by another Counter Trap Card, usually having effects that negate the Summon of a monster and/or the activation of a cards or effect. They have a curved arrow symbol.

== Rules ==
=== Chains ===
A chain is a sequence of card effects activated in response to the same event or to one another. It exists for the management of multiple simultaneous card effects.

A chain is created because card effects are not instantaneous, but have a delay between activation and resolution (costs and targets are still paid and chosen at activation, however), which is what allows them to be countered. If the effect of a card is activated, the opponent always has the possibility to respond with an effect of their own cards before it is applied:

- If the opponent responds, the player can choose to respond back and create the chain.
- If the opponent chooses not to respond, the player can add a second effect and create a chain off of the activation of their own card, at which point the opponent has again the option to respond.

Each player can then continue to add effects to the chain. The chain ends when both players choose not to (or are unable to) play any more cards. Should this happen, the chain is resolved: the resolution is performed in reverse order of activation, starting with the effect of the most recently played card.

If triggered, mandatory effects must be activated at the start of chain or right after the chain resolves, before anyone is allowed to activate optional effects, with the turn player's ones having precedence over the opponent's. Also, as mentioned above, once either player plays a Counter Trap Card, no other card or effect can be chained except more Counter Traps.

It is not allowed to resolve card effects until one has ensured that a chain has or has not been created, and in the former case, is ready to be resolved. This is to be done by always confirming with one's opponent if they would like to respond to any action.

==== Example ====
The turn player plays "Raigeki", a Normal Spell which destroys all the monsters their opponent controls.

Since a monster would be destroyed, the opponent responds by activating "Destruction Jammer", a Counter Trap which allows them to negate the activation of an effect which would destroy a monster on their field, and also destroys the card which would do so, by discarding a card from their hand.

Since a Trap Card was activated, the turn player activates "Solemn Judgement", a Counter Trap which allows them to negate the activation of any card and destroy it, by paying half of their current Life Points.

In this case, the activation of "Raigeki" is Chain Link 1, the activation of "Destruction Jammer" is Chain Link 2, and the activation of "Solemn Judgement" is Chain Link 3. The opponent and the turn player are obligated to immediately discard a card and pay half their Life Points, respectively. If the turn player's opponent does not have any other Counter Traps to play, or chooses not to use them, the chain is resolved, beginning with the highest Chain Link. This results in the following:

1. "Solemn Judgement" is resolved successfully. "Destruction Jammer" is destroyed.
2. "Destruction Jammer" would have resolved here, negating the effects of "Raigeki" and destroying it. However, since "Destruction Jammer" was negated by "Solemn Judgement", its effect is not applied.
3. "Raigeki" resolves successfully, destroying all the monsters the opponent controls.

As only effects are negated, the opponent does not get to take back the card they discarded.

Chains only begin when a player activates a card or its effects. Summoning or Tributing a monster, changing the battle position of a monster, or paying the maintenance cost of a card are not considered card effects, and they do not start chains by themselves.

Banlist

Throughout the game’s history it has received banlists (roughly 3-4 months) to cap the power of certain strategies, whether to keep the game fresh and feeling new to players or to stop the shocking combos known as FTK’s (First Turn Kill) or to give the upcoming decks a chance to compete with the meta. Also it can bring life to previous decks who have had cards on the list, they can come off and be legal to play. And the structure is as follows.

Forbidden

- Cards that have been labeled as Forbidden cannot be played in the main/side/extra deck in legal tournaments in any capacity ergo 0 copies allowed.

Limited

- Cards that have been labeled as limited can only be played at 1 copy max for legal tournaments and that includes both the main/side/extra deck.

Semi-Limited

- Cards that have been labeled as semi-limited can only be played at 2 copies max for legal tournaments and that includes both the main/side/extra deck.

Unlimited

- Cards that have been labeled as unlimited can be played at max copies which in Yu-Gi-Oh is 3 for legal tournaments and includes both the main/side/extra deck.

This portion of the list usually takes cards that have been affected by the banlist before and allows them to be played at max copies, giving certain powerful cards a chance for the spotlight once again.

As of November 11/14/2026 the game has received its biggest banlist in the games history which became effective on October 19, 2026 in which Konami banned 34 cards and limited 8 cards as well semi-limiting 1 card, over the course of YCS Houston, which took care of problematic and frustrating cards to deal with as well as curve the power of certain decks, and to prevent certain cards to become problematic in the future.

== Product information ==
Yu-Gi-Oh! cards are available in Starter Decks, Structure Decks, booster packs, collectible tins, and occasionally as promotional cards.

=== Booster packs ===
As in all other collectible card games, booster packs are the primary avenue of card distribution. In Konami's distribution areas, five or nine random cards are found in each booster pack depending on the set and region, and each set contains varying numbers of different cards. Early Upper Deck booster packs contained a random assortment of nine cards (rarity and value varied), with the whole set ranging around one hundred and thirty cards, as to catch up with the Japanese card pool, two or more original sets were combined into one. Once they did, they changed to simply duplicating the original sets. Some secondary booster packs are reprinted/reissued (e.g. Dark Beginnings Volume 1 and 2); this type of set usually contained a larger number of cards (around 200 to 250), and they contained twelve cards along with one tip card rather than the normal five or nine. Since the release of Tactical Evolution in 2007, all booster packs that have a Holographic/Ghost Rare card, will also contain a rare. Current main booster packs have 101 different cards per set. There are also special booster packs that are given to those who attend a tournament. These sets change periodically and have fewer cards than a typical booster pack, and sometimes switch name altogether (Tournament Packs, Champion Packs, Turbo Packs, Astral Packs, etc.).

=== Duelist Packs ===
Duelist Packs are a type of booster pack focused around the cards used by characters in the various anime series. Cards in each pack were reduced from nine to five making it slightly harder to pull higher rarity cards. They have been discontinued.

=== Promotional cards ===
Some cards in the TCG/OCG have been released by other means, such as inclusion in video games, movies, and Jump magazine issues. These cards are often exclusive and have a special rarity. Occasionally, existing cards that have been forbidden are re-released with revised effects.

== Formats ==
Tournaments are often hosted either by players or by card shops. In addition, Konami, Upper Deck (now no longer part of Yu-Gi-Oh!'s organized play), and Shonen Jump have all organized numerous tournament systems in their respective areas. These tournaments attract hundreds of players to compete for prizes such as rare promotional cards.

In non-Asian territories, there are two main formats, each with its own restrictions on what cards are allowed to be used during events.

The Advanced Format is used in all sanctioned tournaments (with the exception of certain Pegasus League formats). This format follows all the normal rules of the game, but also places a complete ban on certain cards that are deemed too powerful or are unsuitable for tournament play. There are also certain cards that are limited to only 1 or 2, which affects the total number of copies across all three of a player's Decks. This list is updated roughly every three months and is followed in all tournaments that use this format. Asia and the rest of the world have different lists.

Traditional Format, created in October 2004, is a format where all cards that are banned by the Forbidden & Limited List are instead allowed at 1 copy per Deck, while all other rules are identical. This format is rarely used in competitive play and is not recognized altogether in Asia.

The game formerly incorporated worldwide rankings, including a rating system called "COSSY" (Konami card game official tournament support system). COSSY was retired on March 23, 2017.

With the introduction of the Battle Pack: Epic Dawn, Konami has announced the introduction of drafting tournaments. This continued with a second set for sealed play: Battle Pack: War Of The Giants in 2013. The third and final Battle Pack, Battle Pack 3: monster League, was released on July 25, 2014.

There is also Time Wizard, a format that relies on the ruleset, card pool, and limitations of a specific past date in the Trading Card Game's history.

=== Alternate formats ===
==== Yu-Gi-Oh! Speed Duel ====
Yu-Gi-Oh! Speed Duel is a specialized format of the Yu-Gi-Oh! Trading Card Game which launched worldwide (except Asia) in January 2019. The format had an on-going, dedicated product line that was paused at the end of 2024. Inspired by the videogame Yu-Gi-Oh! Duel Links, it features a smaller field and simplified rules, along with a new type of card called Skill Card. Skill Cards are themed around a particular character of the Yu-Gi-Oh! or Yu-Gi-Oh! GX series. To use a card in Speed Duel, it needs to have the "Speed Duel" symbol in the card. Cards without the symbol are not legal in the format, but Speed Duel cards can be used in all other TCG formats. Skill Cards can only be used in Speed Duels.

Speed Duel is known for its rapid matches, averaging on 10 minutes.

The Speed Duel format has the following differences compared to Advanced format:

- Each player has only 3 Main Monster Zones, 3 Spell & Trap Zones, 1 Field Zone and a Graveyard.
- There are no Extra Monster Zones. (except for Duel Links)
- There is no Main Phase 2.
- Each player begins the Duel with 4000 Life Points.
- Each player has a starting hand of 4 cards.
- Main Deck size is 20 to 30 cards.
- Extra Deck size is up to 6 cards.
- Side Deck size is up to 6 cards.

The format also has its own Forbidden & Limited List, which places cards in groups: Forbidden, Limited 1, Limited 2 and Limited 3. All cards and copies of the same card count towards the total of the limit of their respective group.

=== Yu-Gi-Oh! Genesys ===
The Genesys format has following differences:

- No Link Monsters or Pendulum Monsters are allowed.
- The field layout from 2013 and earlier is used, with no Extra Monster Zones nor Pendulum Zones.
- There is no Forbidden & Limited List.
- Deck construction uses a point system. Some cards are assigned a point value; most cards cost zero points. The total point cost of cards in your Main Deck, Extra Deck, and Side Deck (combined) cannot exceed the point cap. The standard point cap is 100, but events and games can be played with any point cap.

== Yu-Gi-Oh! Rush Duel ==
Yu-Gi-Oh! Rush Duel (遊戯王ラッシュデュエル, Yūgiō Rasshu Dueru) is a variant of the Yu-Gi-Oh! Trading Card Game which launched in April 2020 alongside the release of the Yu-Gi-Oh! Sevens anime series, and is currently exclusive to Japan and Korea. Contrary to other formats, it uses a different set of cards from the TCG/OCG entirely (though certain cards get adapted for it), making it more of a sister game. Rush Duel features reworked rules similar to those introduced in Speed Duels, expanded upon and streamlined to make the game even faster.

- Players may Normal Summon or Set as many monsters as they wish in a single turn. Level 5 or higher monsters must still be Tribute Summoned using the number of Tributes required.
- Players start the Duel with four cards in their hand. During their Draw Phase, the turn player draws cards until they have five cards in their hand. If the turn player already has five or more cards in their hand, they draw one.
  - The player going first may draw on their first turn.
  - There is no hand size limit.
- The field now has only three Monster Zones and three Spell & Trap Zones; Extra Monster Zones and Pendulum Zones are not featured.
- There is no Standby Phase or Main Phase 2.
- Certain cards, such as "Blue-Eyes White Dragon", are marked with a "Legend" icon. Each player may only have one Legend Card of each card type (Monster, Spell, and Trap) in their Deck.
- Each card only has one effect, and only Trap Cards can be used outside the Main Phase.
- Monster effects are limited to once per turn per copy by default.
- There are no Synchro, Xyz, Pendulum, and Link Monsters. The game does however feature the exclusive Maximum Monsters, which are sets of three matching Monster Cards that, when gathered in the hand, can be Summoned to the field in "Maximum Mode", where they are treated as a single powerful monster whose ATK is represented by the "Maximum ATK" value on the central card. Since they are still phsically made of three cards, Maximum Monsters cannot be placed in Defense Position, and prevent the player from controlling any other monster.
  - Some Fusion Monsters feature special Types not found among Main Deck monsters, which are based their fusion materials', e.g. certain Fusion Monsters created by fusing a Machine monster with a monster that has a different Type are labelled as "Cyborg" Type. Fusion Monsters have an exclusive on "Multi-Choice Effects", allowing them to bypass the rule of one effect per card, though those effects still share the same activation requirements and cannot be used in the same turn.
  - Ritual Monsters are stored in the Extra Deck instead of the Main Deck.
- Card effects are applied immediately with no activation-resolution window, so there are no chains, and only 1 Trap Card can be activated in response to each action.

== Comparison to other media ==
In its original incarnation in Kazuki Takahashi's Yu-Gi-Oh! manga series, Duel Monsters, originally known as Magic & Wizards, had a rather basic structure, not featuring many of the restricting rules introduced later on, and often featuring peculiar exceptions to the rulings in the interest of providing a more engrossing story. Beginning with the Battle City arc of the manga and Yu-Gi-Oh! Duel Monsters anime series, more structured rules such as Tribute requirements were introduced to the story, with the series falling more in line with the rules of the real life card game by the time its spin-off series began. From the Duel Monsters anime onwards, characters use cards which resemble their TCG/OCG counterparts, though some effects differ between the two media, with some cards created exclusively for one of them. Some of those anime-original cards have been printed since, usually through various side sets, with their effects being adjusted for real life. Yu-Gi-Oh! 5D's featured an anime-original type monster known as Dark Synchro, which involved using "Dark Tuners" to Summon Dark Synchro monsters with negative Levels. Dark Synchro cards were featured as-in in the PlayStation Portable video game series Yu-Gi-Oh! Tag Force, but were released as standard Synchro Monsters. Yu-Gi-Oh! Arc-V features Action Cards, Spell/Trap Cards that are physically picked up in the series' unique Action Duels, which are not possible to perform in real life. In the film Yu-Gi-Oh!: The Dark Side of Dimensions, an exclusive form of Summoning known as Dimension Summoning is featured, which allows players to Summon a monster with ATK or DEF lowered from their original values, and receive damage equal to those when the monster is destroyed instead of normal battle damage. The Yu-Gi-Oh! VRAINS anime series features Speed Duels, with the difference that Skills are special abilities of the Duelist that can be used in most situations but once per Duel, rather than cards that must be played during one's Main Phase (for example, the protagonist Yusaku can generate a random monster when his Life Points are below 1000). A similar ruleset was also featured in the Duel Terminal arcade machine series.

With the exception of the films Pyramid of Light and The Dark Side of Dimensions, where cards match their real-life English appearances, all western releases of the Yu-Gi-Oh! Duel Monsters anime and its subsequent spin-off series, produced by 4Kids Entertainment and later Konami Cross Media NY, edit the appearance of cards to differentiate them from their real-life counterparts in accordance with U.S. Federal Communications Commission regulations in concerning program-length commercials, as well as to make the show more marketable across non-English speaking countries. These cards are edited to only display their artwork, Level/Rank, Attribute, ATK, DEF, and background.

== Spin-offs ==
There are anime and manga spin-offs of the Yu-Gi-Oh! Trading Card Game. Yu-Gi-Oh! Card Game The Chronicles and Yu-Gi-Oh! OCG Stories are both spin-offs which focus on storylines featured on cards. Yu-Gi-Oh! OCG Structures is a series which depicts the card game in a realistic manner, as it is actually played, as opposed to how it is played in other series.

== Controversies ==
=== Tokyo Dome riot ===
In August 1999, Konami held an invite-only tournament in Tokyo Dome, where participants could buy packs containing limited edition cards. Despite being invite-only, the venue quickly become overcrowded with over 55,000 kids and their parents. Fearing the danger of overcrowding, Konami decided to cancel the event midway. Unfortunately, this incited the crowds, as some participants were waiting for four hours only to find out that they will be unable to get the exclusive cards. Police were called to defuse the situation.

After this, no Yu-Gi-Oh! events were held in Tokyo Dome until 2024, almost 25 years after the accident.

=== Konami–Upper Deck lawsuit ===
From March 2002 to December 2008, Konami's trading cards were distributed in territories outside of Asia by the Upper Deck Company. In that month, Konami filed a lawsuit against Upper Deck alleging that it had distributed counterfeit Yu-Gi-Oh! cards, made without Konami's authorization. In response, Upper Deck sued Konami, alleging breach of contract and slander. A few months later, a federal court in Los Angeles issued an injunction preventing Upper Deck from acting as the authorized distributor and requiring it to remove the Yu-Gi-Oh! TCG from Upper Deck's website. In December 2009, the court decided that Upper Deck was liable for counterfeiting Yu-Gi-Oh! TCG cards, and dismissed Upper Deck's countersuit against Konami.

=== Legal dispute with Beyond Comics ===
In 2008, Beyond Comics and its founder Graig Weich filed a lawsuit in the United States District Court for the Southern District of New York against Konami, Nihon Ad Systems, 4Kids Entertainment, Upper Deck, and others, alleging copyright infringement, trade dress infringement, and unfair competition. The complaint stated that Konami and its partners had unlawfully copied the design of Weich's comic book character Ravedactyl, created in 1993, in the design of the card "Elemental Hero Air Neos" from the Yu-Gi-Oh! Trading Card Game and the Yu-Gi-Oh! GX series.

According to the court filing, Ravedactyl had been widely promoted at industry conventions, including San Diego Comic-Con and MIPCOM, and featured in comic books, films, and toy prototypes. Konami also did promotion at many of these events, which included Yu-Gi-Oh! creator Kazuki Takahashi.

Beyond Comics claimed that Konami and Nihon Ad Systems had direct access to the character and that "Air Neos" allegedly misappropriated multiple distinctive elements of Ravedactyl's design, including its helmet, wings, color scheme, and overall stance. The lawsuit also cited statements by Takahashi, who had acknowledged drawing inspiration from American comic book superheroes when designing the "Elemental Hero" cards, including "Neos", and that had Takahashi and/or other Konami staff had been at most of said events.

The "Elemental Hero Air Neos" card, which was originally printed in 2007, had not seen an official reprint by Konami as of 2005. Other cards which referenced "Elemental Hero Air Neos" also had their art edited to remove it. The lawsuit is speculated to be the cause for this. However, in 2025, Graig Weich was interviewed about the lawsuit. While he confirmed that the case did happen, and that it was settled out of court, he also stated that he did not opposed "Elemental Hero Air Neos" continuing to appear in the series. Instead, it was Konami's choice to do so.
