= Treasure Box (disambiguation) =

Treasure Box is a horror novel by Orson Scott Card.

Treasure Box may also refer to:

- Treasure Box (T-ara album)
- Treasure Box – The Complete Sessions 1991–1999, a compilation boxset from the Cranberries
- "Treasure Box", an episode of the television series Teletubbies

== See also ==
- Five Treasure Box, an album by F.T. Island
- Buried treasure (disambiguation)
- Treasure chest (disambiguation)
- Strong box (disambiguation)
- "Vinayak's Treasure Box", track by Jesper Kyd from the 2018 Indian film Tumbbad
