= Beyond Comics =

American comic book publisher

- Founded: 2001; 25 years ago
- Founder: Graig Weich
- Country of origin: United States
- Headquarters location: New York City, New York
- Distribution: Diamond Comics Distributors
- Key people: Graig Weich, CEO/owner
- Publication types: comics
- Owner: Beyond Comics Inc.
- Official website: www.beyondcomics.tv

Beyond Comics is an American independent comic book publishing company founded by comics writer/artist Graig Weich, through which Weich has published comics featuring his creations, including Code Name: Justice, Ravedactyl, Justice, Gekido, and Gekido vs. Code Name: Justice.

== History ==
Beyond Comics was launched by Graig Weich, who began reading comic books as a child, finding in them a sense of hope and inspiration when he was bullied as a child. "When my friends and I were bullied, I thought, 'If we were superheroes, we could defend the kids being attacked.'"

After the September 11 attacks, Weich spoke with some children who informed him that they did not feel there were any heroes that they could identify with. In response, Weich created the superhero Justice, a man who, following the death of his girlfriend at the World Trade Center, wears an American flag as a mask, and takes it upon himself to confront terrorists. Weich created the character to symbolize hope and empowerment for civilians. The first year's proceeds from the first book featuring the character, titled Civilian Justice, were donated to the Restaurant Opportunities Center of New York, and the families from Windows on the World (ROC NY) HERE Fund, which aided victims and families of non-union workers who lost their lives in the attacks. At the New York City Comic Book Museum's first annual Golden Panel Awards in October 2002, which honors creators who legitimize the comics medium, Beyond Comics and Weich were awarded the Golden Panel Award. An original Civilian Justice piece was also displayed in the exhibit "Heroes Among Us: The Art of 9-11".

=== Media appearances ===
The cover of Gekido No. 1

Weich appeared in the August 24, 2011 series premiere of the FOX reality television appraisal series Buried Treasure, episode "A Comic Book, a Violin and a Hoarder". In the episode Leigh and Leslie Keno of Antiques Roadshow appraise valuable items for their owners.

Weich appeared in "Baby Got Super Powers", the December 2, 2012 episode of the E! network's reality TV series Ice Loves Coco, in which Beyond Comics cast model Coco Austin as a superheroine character in the comic book Gekido. Coco appeared as the scantily-clad super heroine at the 2012 New York Comic Con to promote the comic.

Weich drew radio producer Gary Dell'Abate as a ninja in the comic book Gekido, along with Coco.

According to Weich, the character Gekido (whose name means "rage" in Japanese) is a centuries-old man wearing modern-day samurai-like body armor on a mission to confront the world's oldest ninja clan to stop their plans for world domination, using a mystical artifact that may destroy the world. Other celebrities whom Beyond Comics has cast as characters in their comics include Donald Faison, Adrianne Curry, and Cary Hiroyuki Tagawa.

=== Legal dispute with Konami ===
In 2008, Beyond Comics Inc. and its founder Graig Weich filed a lawsuit in the United States District Court for the Southern District of New York against Konami Digital Entertainment Co., Nihon Ad Systems (NAS), 4Kids Entertainment, Upper Deck Company, and others, alleging copyright infringement, trade dress infringement, and unfair competition. The complaint stated that Konami and its partners had unlawfully copied the design of Weich's comic book character Ravedactyl, created in 1993, in the design of the Elemental HERO Air Neos character from the Yu-Gi-Oh! trading card game and animated series.

According to the court filing, Ravedactyl had been widely promoted at industry conventions, including San Diego Comic-Con and MIPCOM, and featured in comic books, films, and toy prototypes. Beyond Comics claimed that Konami and NAS had direct access to the character and that Air Neos allegedly misappropriated multiple distinctive elements of Ravedactyl's design, including its helmet, wings, color scheme, and overall stance. The lawsuit also cited statements by Yu-Gi-Oh! creator Kazuki Takahashi, who had acknowledged drawing inspiration from American comic book superheroes when designing the "Elemental HERO" series, including "Neos", and that Takahashi/other Konami staff had been at most of said events.
