= Strong box =

Strong box or strongbox may refer to:

== A type of box ==
- Strong box, a strongly built and secured casket (decorative box)
- Safe, a strongly built and secured metal box

== Arts, entertainment, and media ==
- "The Strongbox" (1998 TV episode), the 170th episode of Seinfeld
- The Strongbox Chronicles, a book written as Cate Dermody by C. E. Murphy

== Computing and technology ==
- Strongbox, the former name of SecureDrop, a secure communications platform

== See also ==
- Lockbox (disambiguation)
- Safe (disambiguation)
- Treasure Box (disambiguation)
- Treasure chest (disambiguation)
