= Treasure chest (disambiguation) =

A treasure chest containing buried treasure is part of the popular belief surrounding pirates and Old West outlaws.

Treasure chest may also refer to:

- Treasure Chest (comics), a Catholic-oriented comic book published from 1946–1972
- Treasure Chest (Helloween album), 2002
- Treasure Chest (The Kingston Trio album), 1993
- Treasure chest (video games), chests containing various items, currency, and sometimes monsters in many video games
- Treasure Chest (The Seekers album), 1997
- Treasure Chest, a song from The Wiggles' album Stories and Songs: The Adventures of Captain Feathersword the Friendly Pirate, 1993
- "Treasure Chest" (Star Wars Resistance)

== See also ==
- Treasure (disambiguation)
- Chest (disambiguation)
- Buried treasure (disambiguation)
- Treasure Box (disambiguation)
- Strong-box (disambiguation)
