= Buried treasure (disambiguation) =

Buried treasure is an important part of the beliefs surrounding pirates, organized crime and Old West outlaws. See hoard for the concept in archaeology.

Buried treasure may also refer to:

== Film and television ==
- Buried Treasure (1915 film), a U.S. silent short film featuring Florence Crawford
- Buried Treasure (1921 film), a U.S. silent film featuring Norman Kerry
- Buried Treasure (1926 film), a 1926 Our Gang short
- Buried Treasure (1938 film), a 1938 The Captain and the Kids cartoon
- Buried Treasure (2001 film), aka Hidden Treasure (UK), featuring John Thaw
- "Buried Treasure" (Donkey Kong Country episode), a 1998 episode of cartoon series Donkey Kong Country
- "Buried Treasure" (My Name Is Earl), a 2007 episode of the television series My Name Is Earl
- Buried Treasure (Rocky & Bullwinkle episode), 1961 story arc in the animated series Rocky and His Friends
- Buried Treasure (TV program), a 2011 Fox Broadcasting Company television series
- Buried Treasure (TV programme), a 1954–59 British archaeological TV series hosted by Sir Mortimer Wheeler
- Eveready Harton in Buried Treasure, 1929 pornographic animated cartoon
- "History's Mysteries: Buried Treasure", a 2000 episode of U.S. documentary TV series History's Mysteries
- Barry'd Treasure, a 2014 American reality television series that aired on A&E
- "Buried Treasure", an episode of The Wind in the Willows

== Literature ==
- "Buried Treasure" (short story), a 1936 short story by P. G. Wodehouse
- Buried Treasure (book), a 2007 non-fiction book by Victoria Finlay
- Buried Treasures of Chinese Turkestan, 1928 book by German archaeologist Albert von Le Coq

== Music ==
- "Buried Treasure" (song), a 1983 song from Kenny Rogers's album Eyes That See in the Dark
- "Buried Treasure", a 1986 song from the Vels' album House of Miracles
- "Buried Treasures", a 1978 song from Kenny Rogers's album Love or Something Like It
- Buried Treasures (Dave Brubeck album), a 1967 live album by The Dave Brubeck Quartet, released in 1998
- Buried Treasures Vol. I and Buried Treasures Vol. II, 1992 compilation albums by Lindisfarne
- Tom Petty's Buried Treasure, 2005 radio show hosted by musician Tom Petty
- Buried Treasure: Volume One, 2017 boxset of previously unreleased acoustic tracks by Jimmy Buffett

== See also ==
- Treasure chest (disambiguation)
