= SAVE Act =

SAVE Act may refer to:

- Stop Advertising Victims of Exploitation Act of 2014, a US bill prohibiting advertising relating to unlawful commercial sex acts.
- Strengthening Health Care and Lowering Prescription Drug Costs Act, a 2019 US bill proposed by Representative Andy Kim
- Safeguard American Voter Eligibility Act, a 2025 US bill proposing to require proof of citizenship to register to vote in federal elections.

== See also ==
- SAFE Act (disambiguation)
