= Stroke Alliance for Europe =

European health organization

The Stroke Alliance for Europe (SAFE) is a non-profit coalition of European charities all connected with improving healthcare provided to stroke survivors. It represents a range of patient groups from across Europe whose mutual goal is to drive stroke prevention and awareness and promote prevention of stroke through education.

The Stroke Alliance for Europe was formed by the European Parliament in 2004.
