= Same Name =

- Genre: Reality television
- Country of origin: United States
- Original language: English
- No. of seasons: 1
- No. of episodes: 4

Production
- Executive producers: Adam Small; Cris Abrego; Eugene Young; Fax Bahr
- Camera setup: Multiple
- Running time: 44 minutes
- Production company: 51 Minds Entertainment

Original release
- Network: CBS
- Release: July 24 – August 14, 2011

Same Name is an American reality television series in which an average person swaps lives with a celebrity of the same first and last name. It premiered on July 24, 2011 on CBS. The series received low ratings, and CBS pulled it after four-episodes from its Sunday night lineup.

== Premise ==
On the series, two people with the same name switch lives. One person is a well-known celebrity, while the other person is an ordinary individual who simply shares the first and last name of the celebrity.

By the end of the episode, they resume their original lives, and comment how they enjoyed the experience and how they did not.

== Promotions ==
In an episode of CBS' Big Brother 13 (which aired just prior to the show's premiere), the show was promoted during a luxury competition using both the celebrity David Hasselhoff, and the regular-guy David Hasselhoff. The celebrity Hasselhoff later entered the Big Brother house for a cameo appearance.

== Episodes ==
No.	Guest	Original release date
1	David Hasselhoff	July 24, 2011
2	Kathy Griffin	July 31, 2011
3	Mike Tyson	August 7, 2011
4	Reggie Bush	August 14, 2011
