= Survival activating factor enhancement =

Survivor Activating Factor Enhancement (SAFE) is a metabolic pathway. It is an intrinsic protective signaling program to limit cell death activated by the heart. This pathway allows ischaemic postconditioning that helps protect against reperfusion injury. This path involves the activation of a transcription factor called signal transducer and activator of transcription 3 (STAT3). The SAFE pathway interacts with the reperfusion injury salvage kinase pathway to convey the ischemic postconditioning stimulus from the cell surface to the mitochondria, where many of the prosurvival and death signals appear to converge.

== Pathway description ==
Main players of the SAFE pathway are tumor necrosis alpha (TNF-α) cytokine and STAT3 transcription factor. Different other molecules were found to play a role in the SAFE pathway initiation, such as sphingosine-1 phosphate, melatonin, high density lipoproteins, and erythropoietin. When injured cardiac cells start to produce TNF-α, it activates Jak-STAT and then NF-κB signaling pathway, resulting then into lessen cardiomyocyte death at the time of reperfusion.

== Pathway components ==
TNF-α is the initiator of the SAFE pathway during ischemia, reperfusion, and other cardiac injuries that are causing a major increase in pro-inflammatory cytokines production, including TNF-α. It has two different receptors, TNFR1 and TNFR2; both are found to be present on cardiac myocytes. Since TNF-α may act as both inflammatory and anti-inflammatory agent, there are two hypotheses of how TNF-α induces protection in the case of cardiomyocytes. One of them suggested proinflammatory vs. protective decision is based on the receptor selection, when TNFR2 is able to induce protective program, while TNFR1 could cause more damage to cardiac cells. The second hypothesis suggested that SAFE pathway activation could be dose-dependent, where the lesser concentration of TNF-α plays protective role and reduces infarct damage. TNF-α production also activates the sphingolipid pathway, protein kinase C and the mitochondrial potassium ATP dependent channel, thus limiting uncoupling oxidative phosphorylation and swelling of the mitochondria in order to promote cardiomyocyte survival.

STAT3 induces proliferation and survival of cells through activation of different transcription factors and pro-survival proteins production. It is mediated through NF-κB signaling pathway and via increasing of anti-apoptotic gene Bcl-2 and suppressing the pro-apoptotic protein BAX. An even more important function of STAT3 in SAFE pathway is the metabolic interplay with mitochondria. Cardiac tissue is metabolically active and very energy consuming, so it contains a large number of mitochondria. Metabolism of myocardium is mainly aerobic in a normal state, but during ischemia it turns towards anaerobic phenotype, resulting into pH drop, depression of respiratory chain complex activity and then destroying the mitochondrial membrane potential, promoting cell death. STAT3 promotes mitochondrial respiration and regulates reactive oxygen species homeostasis, contributing to mitochondrial recovery.

Another well-described protective cardiac metabolic pathway, Reperfusion Injury Salvage Kinase (RISK) pathway, also converges to mitochondria protecting functions, despite being separately activated from the SAFE pathway.

== Wine consumption ==
Some researchers reported that the red wine components, such as polyphenols (resveratrol, catechin, epicatechin, quercetin, and anthocyanin), and melatonin could provide protection for cardiac cells, suggesting that protective qualities are operating through the SAFE metabolic pathway. The connection between SAFE pathway and red wine consumption is probably mediated through toll-like receptor 4 (TLR4) which then activates TNF-α/STAT3, and oxidative capacity of polyphenols, which altogether results into protective effect from moderate red wine consumption.

However, chronic stimulation of the SAFE pathway in connection to cardioprotection does not seem to be beneficial for the heart since TNF-α could increase the inflammation and apoptosis through TNFR1. Moreover, the beneficial effect of red wine consumption in a long-term perspective is still a controversial question, despite the large number of in vitro/in vivo experimental models. Reasons for that are possible counteracting effect of ethanol in wine and overall complication with translation from research models to clinical settings.
