= SAFE Act =

SAFE Act may refer to:

== U.S. federal legislation ==
- Safeguarding Americans from Extremism Act of 2023, a proposed bill to prohibit Palestinians from entering the United States
- Secure and Fair Enforcement Banking Act (SAFE Banking Act of 2019), a bill to improve access to banking and financial services for cannabis businesses
- Secure and Fair Enforcement for Mortgage Licensing Act of 2008, a bill to required states to create a Mortgage Loan Originator (MLO) licensing and registration system
- Securing Adolescents From Exploitation-Online Act (2007), a proposed bill aiming to curb online child exploitation
- Security and Freedom Ensured Act (2003), a proposed bill to curtail some aspects of the USA PATRIOT Act
- American Safety Against Foreign Enemies Act (2015), a proposed bill to require background investigations for refugees from Iraq and Syria
- Safe Aviation Flight Enhancement Act, a proposed bill in the U.S. House of Representatives for deployable flight recorders
- Security and Freedom Through Encryption Act of 1999, a proposed bill related to encryption policy

== U.S. state legislation ==
- Save Adolescents From Experimentation (SAFE) Act of 2021, an Arkansas law banning doctors from providing gender-affirming healthcare to transgender youth
- Missouri Save Adolescents from Experimentation (SAFE) Act, a 2023 Missouri law prohibiting medical professionals from administering gender-affirming medical care to minors
- New York Secure Ammunition and Firearms Enforcement Act (NY SAFE Act) of 2013, the New York gun control legislation
- Saving Ohio Adolescents from Experimentation (SAFE) Act, a 2023 Ohio law prohibiting medical professionals from administering gender-affirming medical care to minors
- Secure and Fair Elections Act, Kansas's voter identification law, enacted in 2011

== See also ==
- SAFE-T Act of 2021, an Illinois law pertaining to the criminal justice system
- SAVE Act (disambiguation)
