= Leigh and Leslie Keno =

American antique experts

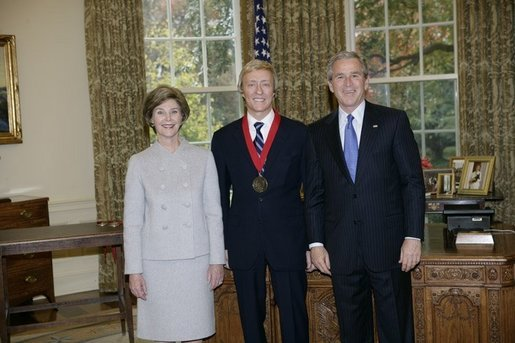
President George W. Bush and First Lady Laura Bush stand with 2005 National Humanities Medal recipient Leslie Keno on November 10, 2005, in the Oval Office.

Leigh Ronald Keno and Leslie Bernard Keno (twins born March 16, 1957) are American antiquarians, authors, historic car judges, preservationists, and television hosts. They specialize in stoneware, early American furniture and vintage automobiles. They are widely known as appraisers on the PBS series Antiques Roadshow, for favoring preservation of antiques over restoration and for their high-energy personalities.

== Background ==
The Kenos were born to Norma and Ronald Keno, who were both antiques dealers, in Herkimer County, New York and grew up in Mohawk, New York. Leigh was born 13 minutes before his brother. Their father collected and restored vintage sports cars and both parents specialized in folk art and country furniture. Their mother would take them out of school on Fridays to regional flea markets and antiques shows. The brothers took interest, were earning $200 or $300 a weekend by the time they were in the fourth grade and by age twelve had entered in their joint diary, "We are Antique Dealers". At age fourteen, the brothers set a world record for American stoneware, paying $3,500 for an American salt-glazed stoneware jug.

Leigh earned an A.A. degree from Herkimer College in 1977 and a BA in the History of Art from Hamilton College in 1979. While there, his activities included an interest in health and fitness as well as in vintage automobiles. While playing drums in three bands (including drumming for the college jazz band "Hamilton Blues"), he produced a catalog of selections from Hamilton's material culture and art. While a senior at Hamilton College, he was responsible for installing on the campus 19th century class monuments which he installed between Minor Theater and Bristol Center that were dumped in a nearby field decades earlier.

Leslie earned an A.A. degree from Herkimer College in 1977 and graduated from Williams College cum laude in 1979.

While a senior vice president and director of American furniture and decorative arts at Sotheby's, Leslie married Emily Becnel, an administrator in the English furniture department at Sotheby's, in New York in 1995. They have two children, Ashley and Schuyler. Leigh has a son, Brandon.

Leigh, who was an appraiser at Christie's, started his own business as a dealer and advisor in fine art and antiques in New York in 1986.

Leigh and Leslie own a 1938 SS 100 Jaguar 3.5-liter, purchased from their father, which they raced on the track at Lime Rock Park and which they drove on Louis Vuitton Classic China Run, a 1000-mile rally from Dalian to Beijing. They serve as judges in pre-war and post-war preservation classes at the Pebble Beach Concours d'Elegance.

The twins' older brother, Mitchell, is an antiques appraiser who has also appeared on Antiques Roadshow.

== Careers ==
The brothers have appeared as furniture appraisers on the PBS series Antiques Roadshow since 1997, have hosted the WGBH series Find! together starting in 2003 and were hosts of the internet show Collect This! with the Keno Brothers on MSN's Tech & Gadgets guide site from 2008 to 2010.

In 2000, they co-authored a book on antique furniture with Joan Barzilay Freund, Hidden Treasures: Searching for Masterpieces of American Furniture.

Leigh opened his own antique dealership in New York City in 1986 and for a number of years Leslie headed the American furniture and decorative arts division at Sotheby's. He now runs Leslie Keno Art Advisory in Wilton, CT.

They were awarded the National Humanities Medal in 2005.

In 2008, they joined then-First Lady Laura Bush on a History Channel televised tour of the White House. It was the first tour of the White House by a first lady since Jackie Kennedy gave hers in 1963.

Leigh founded Keno Auctions in 2009 and continues to advise major clients in the art and antiques world. The company is based in his townhouse on the Upper East Side.

In 2010, they created a lifestyle brand called Keno Bros. designed by them and manufactured by Theodore Alexander. The brand, which embodies contemporary design with clean lines, is sold in retail stores throughout the United States and 30 other countries around the world. In addition, the Keno Bros. brand has a growing presences starting in 2015 in Southeast Asia and China in the form of stand-alone stores in major cities.

In 2011, the brothers co-hosted a reality show, Buried Treasure, on the Fox network in which they visited people's homes searching for valuable art and antiques. Their discoveries, which were subsequently sold, brought much needed cash to the families in need.

In 2014, Leigh was invited to serve on the Board of Directors of the Appraiser's Association of America. Founded in 1949, the Appraisers Association of America, Inc. is the oldest and arguably most respected non-profit professional association of personal property appraisers.

In early 2014, Leigh and Leslie started a private equity fund, the Historic Motor Car Investment Fund, the investment objective of which is to seek capital appreciation exclusively through the acquisition, conservation and/or restoration and eventual sale of classic and historic cars. The fund focuses on acquiring the rarest and most desirable classic cars produced by renowned marques such as Alfa Romeo, Aston Martin, Bugatti, Ferrari, Jaguar, Lamborghini, Maserati and Porsche. The fund's investment manager believes that classic cars with the strongest upside potential are "blue-chip" models with international cachet produced during the 1950s and later. Particular emphasis will be paid to specific models of limited production built during the 1960s through the 1980s that the investment manager believes are undervalued.

Leslie and Leigh co-wrote a chapter with contributors including Fred Simeone, Miles Collier, Ed Gilbertson and Malcolm Collum, "The Stewardship of Historically Important Automobiles," which won the 2013 prestigious International Historic Motoring award "publication of the year". They judge at several Concours events and moderate and/or speak at numerous panels and events, including the inaugural symposium at the 2014 Pebble Beach Concours d'Elegance.
