= Lockbox =

A lockbox or lock box refers to a box, container or otherwise enclosed space with a built-in lock. Examples include:

== Physical storage ==
- Bank vault, a secure space where money, valuables, records, and documents are stored
- Post office box, a rented secure mailbox at a post office
- Safe, a secure lockable box used for securing valuable objects
- Safes for holding keys
  - Knox Box, a small, wall-mounted safe that stores the key to a building, used by firefighters and emergency services
  - Real-estate lock box, a box that stores the keys to a building, used by real-estate agents
- Safe deposit box, a secure container for storage of valuables, usually in a bank

== Other uses ==
- Lockbox (accounts receivable), a service offered to organizations by commercial banks to simplify collection and processing of accounts receivable
- Lockbox (film), an upcoming American supernatural horror film

== See also ==
- Locker, a small lockable storage compartment
- Keychain, small ring or chain of metal to which several keys can be attached
- Time lock, a part of a locking mechanism commonly found in bank vaults and other high-security containers.
