= Fail-safe (disambiguation) =

A fail-safe describes a device which, if or when it fails, will cause a minimum of harm.

Fail-safe may also refer to:

- Fail-Safe (novel), a 1962 novel about an accidental sortie of American nuclear bombers against the USSR
  - Fail Safe (1964 film), a 1964 film, based on the novel, directed by Sidney Lumet
  - Fail Safe (2000 film), a 2000 made-for-television drama, based on the novel, starring George Clooney
- Fail-Safe Investing, a 1999 finance book by Harry Browne
- Failsafe (UK band), a Preston-based punk rock band
- "Failsafe", a 2007 song by the New Pornographers, from the album Challengers
  - This song was first released by The Choir Practice in their The Choir Practice (album)
- "Fail Safe" (Stargate SG-1), an episode of the science fiction television series
- "Fail-Safe" (Legends of Tomorrow), an episode of Legends of Tomorrow
- Failsafe (comics), a character from DC Comics
