= Safe (band) =

Russian band

The Safe (Сейф)
- Origin: USSR, Russia
- Genres: Rock, new wave, fusion, Russian rock
- Years active: 1987–present
- Label: Safe Records
- Members: See Members section below
- Website: Official website

The Safe is a Russian band which has been active since the late 1980s. They are known for their original poetry.

== History ==
=== Formation ===
The Safe was formed in 1987 in Palekh, a town with a long history of Russian lacquer miniature painting. The creative atmosphere of the town is alluded to have helped shape band members Nikolay Kovalev, Sergey Karavaev, Ivan Beketov, Sergey Shamin and Yuriy Petrov, three of whom attended Palekh Art School. The members were also inspired by the movies of Russian director Andrei Tarkovsky, who visited the school; 20 years later, the Safe played at the closing of the first Zerkalo International Film Festival, named after Tarkovsky.

=== 1990s ===
Since 1992, the Safe chose another form of existence. Once a year, the band members got together to record a new album (on their own label, Safe Records) and to play a couple of concerts.

=== 2000s ===
Gradually, a creative association formed around the team that arranged various cultural and art performances. The group released two diverse LPs: Chas Tainstva (Mystery Hour) in 2004 and Pereferiynoe Zrenie (Peripheral Eyesight) in 2005. In 2007, the Safe released a LP Minory Vesny (Minors of Spring). Mikhail Larionov unexpectedly died on 5 October 2007, just one month before their jubilee concert commemorating 20 years of the band.

=== 2010s ===
From 2010 to 2013, the Safe played in a number of local and all-Russian music festivals including the Nashestvie.

== Members ==
- Nikolay Kovalev — vocal, guitar, bass, keyboard
- Sergey Karavaev — bass, back vocal, guitar, keyboard
- Tatyana Sviridenko — keyboard, back vocal
- Pavel Bakharev — drums
- Alexander Leonov — saxophone, flute, bongo

== Discography ==
Their discography includes more than thirty albums.

=== Albums ===
- 1987 — Vorobyiny Tvist (Sparrow's Twist)
- 1988 — Opavshiy Den (Shacked Day)
- 1989 — Vremya Golodnykh Snov (Time of Hungry Dreams)
- 1989 — Deti Blyuza (Children of the Blues)
- 1990 — Zhertvoprinoshenie (Immolation)
- 1991 — Blazhenny Tuman (Blessed Fog)
- 1991 — Vetkhaya Radost (Shabby Joy)
- 1992 — Zovuschaya v Dal (Calling Away)
- 1992 — 12 ½ Mesyatsev (12 ½ Months)
- 1993 — Khranitel Ognya (Fire Keeper)
- 1994 — Prosnuvshis sredi Tsvetov (Woken Up Among Flowers, remix)
- 1994 — Zloy, Plokhoy… (Evil, Bad...)
- 1995 — Trans (Trance)
- 1996 — Suitsidalny Terror (Suicide Terror)
- 1997 — Life-10-live
- 1997 — Reincarnatsiya Chuvstv (Reincarnation of Feelings)
- 1998 — Les (Forest)
- 1999 — Trinadtsaty (The 13th)
- 2000 — Sekretny (Secret)
- 2001 — Tot Bereg & Upadanie (That Shore & Falling Down, soundtracks)
- 2002 — Kody (Codas) 1987–2002
- 2002 — Orkestr Tishiny Odinokikh Vetrov (Orchestra of Lonely Winds Silence)
- 2003 — FM-acoustic
- 2004 — Chas Tainstva (Mystery Hour)
- 2005 — Pereferiynoe Zrenie (Peripheral Eyesight)
- 2006 — Dezhurstvo Uchastkovogo Klochkova (Duty of Police Inspector Klochkov)
- 2007 — Minory Vesny (Minors of Spring)
- 2008 — Safe_mp3 2000—2008 (only in mp3 format on the web-site of the band)
- 2009 — Dolgy I Goryachy (Long and Hot)
- 2010 — Vse Pechali Mira (All Sorrows of the World)
- 2011 — Imya Muzy (Name of the Muse)
- 2012 — Omut Tumanov (Misty Deep Pool, album-book)

=== Compilation appearances ===
- 2004 — Muzyka Palekhskikh Zim (Music of the Winters in Palekh, literary and musical album)
- 2004 — Ona Vsekh Prekrasney (She's the Most Beautiful, remixes)
- 2007 — Okhota (Hunting) — 19 (bomba-piter inc.)

=== Other releases ===
- 2007 — Za Pesney Dozhdya (Following the Song of Rain, promo CD)
- 2007 — Sekretny (Secret — live 2000 Unplugged)
