= Buried Treasure (TV program) =

- Title card
- Starring: Leigh Keno; Leslie Keno
- No. of seasons: 1
- No. of episodes: 4

Production
- Executive producers: Joe Livecchi; Leigh Keno; Leslie Keno; Paul Buccieri; Tim Eagan; Tim Miller
- Production company: ITV Studios

Original release
- Network: Fox
- Release: August 24 – September 14, 2011

Buried Treasure is an American appraisal reality television program that debuted on the Fox network on August 24, 2011. The show is hosted by two professional appraisers, Leigh and Leslie Keno of Antiques Roadshow notability, who travel to people's houses in search of valuable items to appraise and sell for their owners. The show often features home owners who are in need of money, due to illness or other financial difficulties, that would evoke emotion in the audience. The premiere of the show attracted only 3.6 million viewers, while a competing show, Pawn Stars, typically receives twice as many viewers each week. It was not renewed for a second season.

== Episode ==
No.	Title	Original release date
1	"A Comic Book, a Violin and a Hoarder"	August 24, 2011
2	"Rembrandts, a Horse Farm and the Texans"	August 31, 2011
3	"The Recluse & an Ohio Treasure House"	September 7, 2011
4	"The Native American, the Foreclosure & the Classic Car"	September 14, 2011
