= Michael Avenatti =

American attorney and criminal (born 1971)

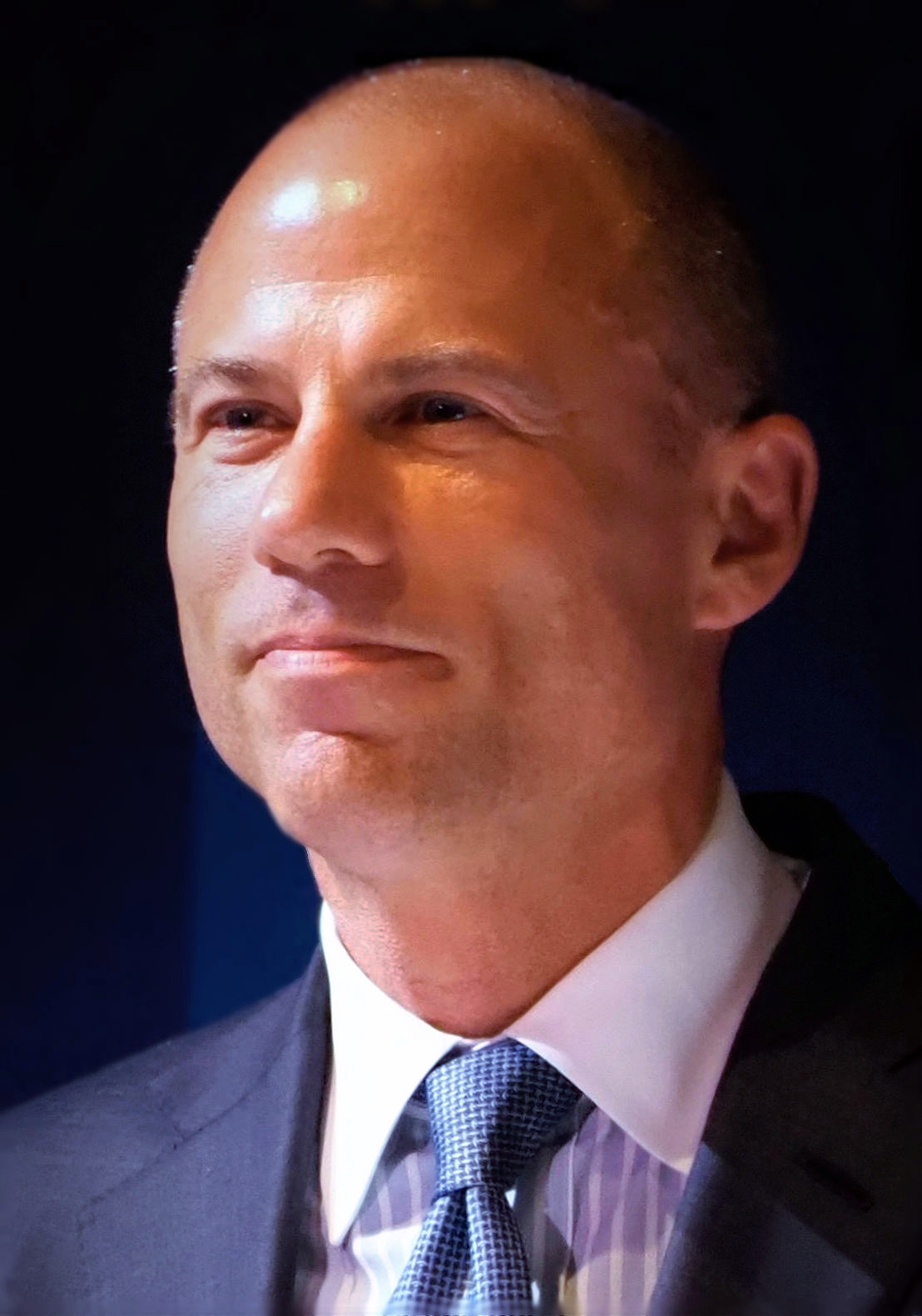
- Avenatti in 2018
- Born: Michael John Avenatti; February 16, 1971 (age 55); Sacramento, California, U.S.
- Education: Saint Louis University; University of Pennsylvania (BA); George Washington University (JD)
- Political party: Democratic
- Spouses: Christine Carlin (divorced) Lisa Storie (m. 2011; div. 2018)
- Children: 3
- Criminal information
- Status: Transferred to a halfway house
- Conviction: Extortion; Communications with intent to extort; Wire fraud (5 counts); Obstruction; Aggravated identity theft
- Penalty: 5 years in prison (Note: 2 1/2 years for Nike extortion; 4 years for defrauding Stormy Daniels with 2 1/2 years consecutive to previous sentence) with an additional sentence to come.
- Website: www.michaelavenatti.com

Michael John Avenatti (born February 16, 1971) is an American former attorney currently incarcerated for felony fraud and extortion. He is best known for his legal representation of adult film actress Stormy Daniels in lawsuits against then U.S. President Donald Trump, and his multiple convictions for attempting to extort sports apparel company Nike and defrauding and embezzling settlement money from a series of other clients. In the late 2010s, Avenatti appeared extensively on television and in print as a legal and political commentator, and as a representative for prominent clients.

In March 2019, Avenatti was indicted in California and New York on various criminal counts including extortion, tax evasion, fraud, and embezzlement. On February 14, 2020, Avenatti was convicted of extorting Nike in a New York court, and on July 8, 2021, he was sentenced to 30 months in prison. In a subsequent case, he was sentenced to four years of prison for a financial crime against Stormy Daniels, with 18 of those months to be served concurrently with the Nike sentence, thus adding 12 months to his total time to serve. He has been imprisoned since February 7, 2022. On June 12, 2025, he was sentenced to 11 years for stealing millions from clients, to be served concurrently with the Stormy Daniels sentence. He was disbarred from practice in California on February 5, 2025.

== Early life and education ==
Avenatti was born on February 16, 1971, in Sacramento, California, into a family of Italian heritage. He spent his early childhood in Colorado and Utah. His father was a manager for Anheuser-Busch. He moved with his family to Chesterfield, Missouri, a suburb of St. Louis, in 1982, where he attended Parkway Central High School.

After graduating in 1989, Avenatti attended Saint Louis University for one year before transferring to the University of Pennsylvania, where he graduated with a Bachelor of Arts in political science in 1996. While in college, he worked as an opposition researcher for Rahm Emanuel's political consulting firm. After college, Avenatti attended the George Washington University Law School. His application was initially wait-listed, and he was eventually admitted to its evening school program. While a law student, Avenatti worked with Professor Jonathan Turley on constitutional issues relating to the Foreign Intelligence Surveillance Act (FISA).

Avenatti graduated in 2000 and ranked first in his class with a Juris Doctor with high honors and Order of the Coif membership. In 2003, the George Washington Law School established the Michael J. Avenatti Award for Excellence in Pre-Trial and Trial Advocacy after Avenatti made five-figure donations to the school. The annual award is given to the member of the graduating Juris Doctor class who demonstrates excellence in pre-trial and trial advocacy. Avenatti was awarded GW's Alumni Recognition Award in 2010.

== Career ==
In college and later in law school, Avenatti worked at The Research Group, a political opposition research and media firm run by Rahm Emanuel (later White House Chief of Staff for President Barack Obama, and Mayor of Chicago). Avenatti worked on over 150 Democratic and Republican campaigns in 42 states while studying at George Washington University.

After law school, Avenatti worked at O'Melveny & Myers in Los Angeles, California, alongside Daniel M. Petrocelli, who previously represented the Ron Goldman family in its case against O. J. Simpson. He assisted Petrocelli on multiple legal matters, including the representation of singer Christina Aguilera and litigation surrounding the movie K-19: The Widowmaker, and worked extensively for Don Henley and Glenn Frey of the musical group the Eagles, including in a suit brought by former bandmate Don Felder against the group and Irving Azoff.

Avenatti later joined Greene Broillet & Wheeler, a Los Angeles boutique law firm. While there, he handled a number of high-profile cases, including a $10 million defamation case against Paris Hilton which was settled out of court, settled an idea-theft lawsuit relating to the show The Apprentice and against producers Mark Burnett and Donald Trump, and a $40 million embezzlement lawsuit involving KPMG.

In 2007, Avenatti formed the law firm Eagan Avenatti, LLP (formerly known as Eagan O'Malley & Avenatti, LLP) with offices in Newport Beach, Los Angeles, and San Francisco, all in California. The firm launched many high-profile lawsuits, including one over allegedly defective hospital gowns. He appeared on 60 Minutes three times in connection with cases he has handled.

Avenatti also served as lead counsel on a number of historically large cases, including an April 2017 $454 million verdict after a jury trial in Federal Court in Los Angeles in a fraud case against Kimberly-Clark and Halyard Health, later reduced to a $21.7 million verdict upon appeal, an $80.5 million class-action settlement against Service Corporation International, and a $41 million jury verdict against KPMG.

In 2013, Avenatti formed a company, Global Baristas, to buy Seattle-based Tully's Coffee out of bankruptcy. Avenatti first formed a partnership with actor Patrick Dempsey, but Dempsey later backed away from the venture after a short legal battle that resulted in a settlement. Since 2015, Global Baristas has been named in more than 50 lawsuits in state and federal courts for breach of contract, unpaid bills, and unpaid taxes.

In 2015, Avenatti prevailed against the National Football League (NFL) following a jury trial in Dallas. He later pursued a class-action suit on behalf of fans who showed up for Super Bowl XLV with tickets that didn't correspond to actual seats, but the courts in Texas declined to certify the class.

In 2016, Avenatti filed another class action lawsuit against the NFL, this time on behalf of ticket-holders to the annual Hall of Fame Game, which was canceled a few hours before kickoff.

In 2017, ex-con Gerald Tobin alleged Avenatti failed to pay him $28,700 for private investigatory work. As a result, Avenatti's firm was abruptly forced into bankruptcy. Tobin, a Floridian with four decades of convictions and jail time, was not a licensed investigator. Tobin's claim forced Avenatti to cancel a deposition in an unrelated lawsuit days later, raising the question of collusion between Avenatti and Tobin. The issue was resolved when the pair entered a non-disclosure agreement, and Avenatti paid Tobin the $28,700.

In 2018, Avenatti's law firm was subjected to a $10 million judgment in a U.S. bankruptcy court. Avenatti has also defaulted on a $440,000 verdict in back taxes, penalties, and interest that he was personally obligated to pay under another bankruptcy settlement. The U.S. Attorney's office asserted in court that a motion seeking payment would soon be filed against Avenatti. Eagan Avenatti had been in Chapter 11 bankruptcy proceedings and, in December 2017, had agreed to pay $4.8 million in unpaid fees to a former partner, $2 million in back taxes, and $1 million to other creditors. In June 2018, the former partner filed a motion in U.S. bankruptcy court asking for a lien on any and all legal fees Avenatti's firm might collect, up to $10 million, from clients in 54 cases including his representation of Stormy Daniels.

In November 2018, a few days after his arrest on suspicion of domestic violence, Avenatti's law firm was evicted from its office in Newport Beach after skipping $213,000 worth of rent payments. In January 2019, a former client filed an arbitration against Avenatti, alleging misuse of settlement funds Eagan Avenatti LLP had received in trust.

On June 3, 2019, the California State Bar filed a 573-page petition to enroll Avenatti in involuntary inactive status pending the outcome of the criminal cases and the disciplinary action which will be filed against him. The primary basis for the action was Avenatti's alleged embezzlement of $1,600,000 in funds from client Greg Barela.

=== Racing ===
Starting in 2010, Avenatti drove in approximately 33 sportscar races, including various American Le Mans Series, FIA World Endurance Championship, Porsche Supercup, and United SportsCar Championship races in the United States and Europe. These races included the 24 Hours of Daytona, 12 Hours of Sebring, 2012 Petit Le Mans, and the Long Beach Grand Prix. Avenatti had been planning to race the 2013 24 Hours of Le Mans, but replaced himself with Patrick Long a few weeks before the event because scheduling conflicts had arisen with his other business interests. At the 2015 24 Hours of Le Mans, Avenatti teamed up with Saudi Prince Abdulaziz bin Turki Al Saud and Polish driver Jakub "Kuba" Giermaziak in the No. 66 JMW Motorsport Ferrari 458 Italia. The team placed seventh in its class.

24 Hours of Le Mans results

| Year | Team | Co-drivers | Car | Class | Laps | Pos. | Class pos. |
|---|---|---|---|---|---|---|---|
| 2015 | (United Kingdom) JMW Motorsport | (Poland) Kuba Giermaziak (Saudi Arabia) Abdulaziz al Faisal | Ferrari 458 Italia GT2 | GTE; Am | 320 | 36th | 7th |

=== Pepsi Points case ===
Prior to the 1999 resolution of the Leonard v. Pepsico, Inc. lawsuit, Avenatti – then a law student – was hired by plaintiff John Leonard as a media relations consultant. Avenatti assisted Leonard in developing relationships and gaining interviews with earned media in order to sway public opinion. The two became close friends. At one stage, Leonard and Avenatti embarked on a road trip to Tulsa, Oklahoma – financed by the former's business partner, Todd Hoffman – in order to meet Victor Miller, who had allegedly given Pepsi right of first refusal for his privately owned Harrier jet.

Through his research, Avenatti discovered that the Pepsi Stuff commercial aired in Canada – also displaying a supposedly redeemable Harrier jump jet – included a disclaimer stating that the offer was in jest. He also unearthed information relating to the 1992 Pepsi Number Fever disaster in the Philippines, as the result of a failed Pepsi marketing campaign. Avenatti eventually left the team over disagreement with his methods.

Avenatti appeared in the 2022 Netflix docuseries Pepsi, Where's My Jet?, recounting his role in Leonard's defense; his interviews were filmed under house arrest.

=== Stormy Daniels lawsuits ===
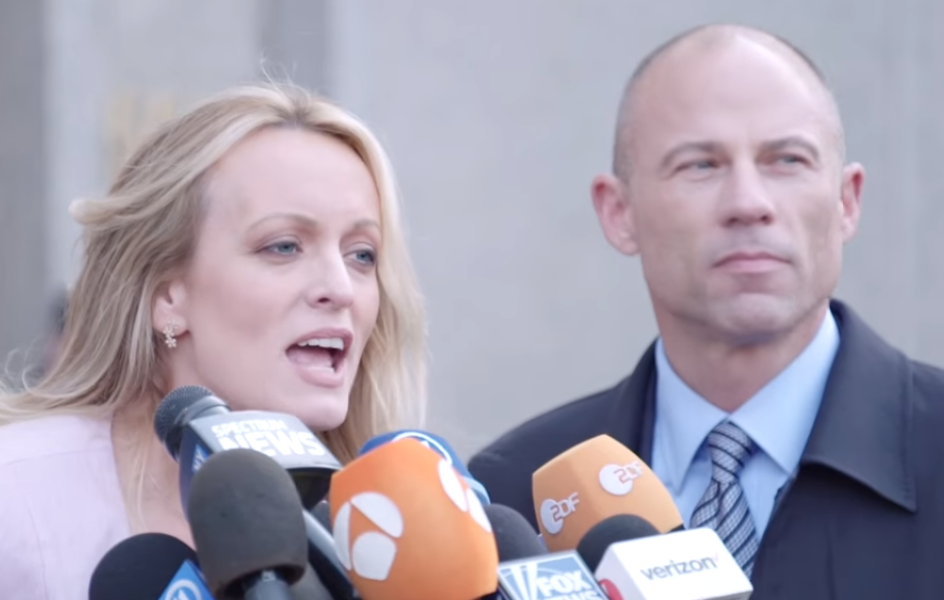
Stormy Daniels and Michael Avenatti in 2018

In March 2018, Avenatti filed a lawsuit on behalf of adult film actress Stormy Daniels seeking to invalidate a 2016 non-disclosure agreement regarding an alleged affair with Donald Trump in 2006, claiming that Daniels had been paid off by Trump's lawyer Michael Cohen not to disclose information covered by the NDA. The non-disclosure agreement had been negotiated in the final days of the 2016 U.S. Presidential campaign. Avenatti also represented Daniels in a related defamation suit against Trump. In October 2018, a federal judge dismissed the defamation lawsuit and ordered Daniels to pay Trump's legal fees. Avenatti said he would appeal that decision; Daniels later said that Avenatti had initiated the suit against her wishes.

Avenatti was a frequent guest on talk shows and cable news programs to discuss the cases, logging 108 CNN and MSNBC appearances between March 7 and May 10, 2018. He also gained a large following on Twitter; he ended his tweets about the case and other Trump-related matters with the Twitter hashtag "#basta" – the Italian word for "enough."

In May 2018, Avenatti released records showing multiple large payments, some from major corporations, into the bank account Cohen had used to pay Daniels. Cohen's lawyers subsequently argued that some of the transactions released by Avenatti involved a different Michael Cohen, but they did not dispute the larger deposits. The US Treasury Department opened an investigation into how Avenatti gained information from Cohen's private bank records. Avenatti had also filed a motion to join the federal investigation of Michael Cohen. The federal judge issued Avenatti "a choice" that if he wanted to join, he would have to end what the judge called his "publicity tour" of TV appearances and tweets about the case. Avenatti withdrew the motion, and appeared on MSNBC that same day.

In early March 2019, Daniels terminated her arrangement with Avenatti, replacing him with attorney Clark Brewster. Later that month, when federal charges against Avenatti were announced, she said, "Knowing what I know now about Michael, I'm saddened but not shocked regarding his arrest." Avenatti faces New York charges of wire fraud, identity theft, and embezzling almost $300,000 from Daniels. On June 2, 2022, Avenatti was sentenced to four years in prison for defrauding Daniels.

=== Immigration ===
Avenatti provided a video to MSNBC, which aired on the June 25, 2018, episode of The Rachel Maddow Show, a "secretly shot" video of a child in the custody of immigration officials who was separated from her mother. The video was leaked by a former employee whom Avenatti represented. The leaked video was part of the response to the Trump administration family separation policy.

=== Julie Swetnick allegations ===
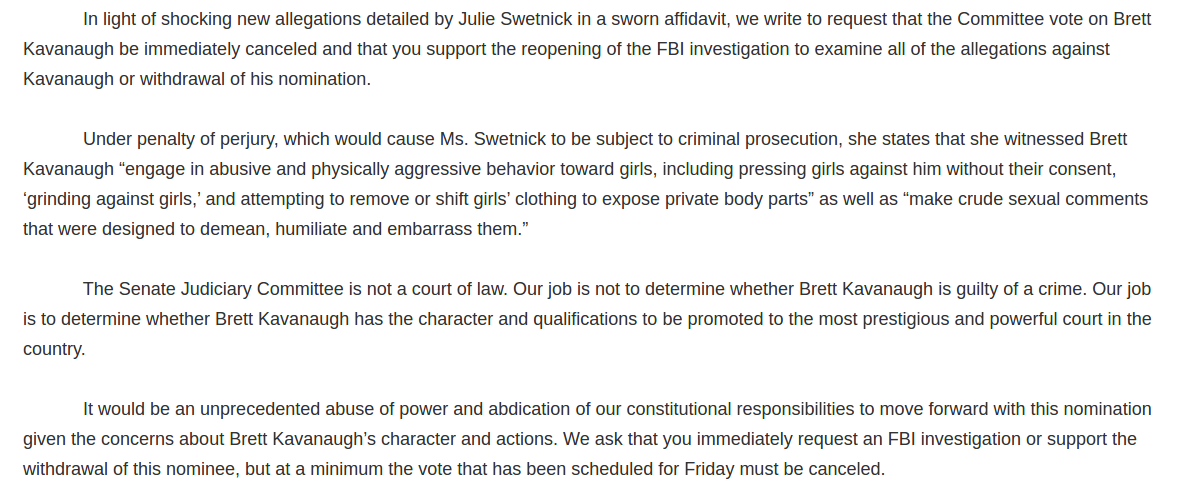
U.S. Senate Judiciary Committee Democrats on declaration of Julie Swetnick

In September 2018, as the nomination of Brett Kavanaugh to the Supreme Court was being evaluated in the Senate, two women accused him of inappropriate sexual conduct while in high school or college. Avenatti then announced that he had a client who made additional allegations against Kavanaugh as both a witness and a victim of his inappropriate behavior and that she would soon come forward publicly. On September 25, the woman was publicly identified by Avenatti as Julie Swetnick, a resident of Washington, D.C., and a 1980 graduate of Gaithersburg High School in Maryland. Swetnick claimed, in an unnotarized declaration, signed under penalty of perjury, that Kavanaugh, as a high school student in the early 1980s, drank excessively and engaged in physically aggressive behavior toward girls. She said he was present at parties where girls were drugged and gang-raped and that he participated in those activities. Swetnick also claimed she was gang-raped at a party where Kavanaugh was present, although he did not personally participate in the attack. Kavanaugh retorted, "I don't know who this is and this never happened." On September 26, Democrats on the Judiciary Committee sent a letter to Chairman Grassley requesting "[i]n light of shocking new allegations detailed by Julie Swetnick" that the vote be immediately canceled and that Grassley should support either the reopening of the FBI investigation or the withdrawal of Kavanaugh's nomination. In an NBC interview, Swetnick provided the names of four people she alleged were friends who had gone to the parties with her – however, one is deceased and another claimed not to know her.

Avenatti announced that he had a sworn declaration by another woman corroborating Swetnick's accusations. Subsequently, NBC News reported that the unnamed declarant told them on September 30 (before Michael Avenatti released her sworn statement on October 3 with her name redacted) that she never thought it was Kavanaugh spiking the punch and that she never witnessed him act inappropriately towards girls. In a text to NBC News on October 4, the unnamed accuser reiterated, "It is incorrect that I saw Brett spike the punch. I didn't see anyone spike the punch...I was very clear with Avenatti from day one," adding that she would never allow anyone to be abusive towards males or females in her presence. She also expressed that she had only given her sworn declaration a cursory look. The response to NBC News by Avenatti was that she read, signed, and repeatedly stood behind the sworn declaration. The unnamed declarant contacted NBC News on October 5 and reiterated her denial of ever seeing Kavanaugh spike punch or act inappropriately toward women, and accused Avenatti of twisting her words.

Kavanaugh was confirmed to the Supreme Court by a margin of 50–48, mostly along party lines. Democratic Senators blamed Avenatti as the Swetnick accusation "gave Republicans an opportunity to shift the narrative away from Ford's allegations and make a broader case that the growing accusations of sexual misconduct amounted to an orchestrated Democratic smear campaign". Senator Susan Collins, a Republican swing vote, called the Swetnick allegation "outlandish...[without] any credible supporting evidence", and ended up supporting Kavanaugh's nomination. Senator Gary Peters said that Avenatti's allegation "turns [sic] it into a circus atmosphere and certainly that's not where we should be", while another Senate aide said that "Democrats and the country would have been better off if Mr. Avenatti spent his time on his Iowa vanity project rather than meddling in Supreme Court fights". Avenatti fired back, criticizing anonymous Democrats as "cowards", arguing that this showed "failed leadership" in the Democratic Party.

Senate Judiciary Chairman Chuck Grassley referred Avenatti and Swetnick to the Department of Justice for a possible criminal investigation over allegations they made false statements to Congress about now-Supreme Court Justice Brett Kavanaugh. Avenatti called the referral "completely baseless."

=== Representation of R. Kelly accusers ===
In February 2019, Avenatti provided Cook County State's Attorney's Office with a tape of R. Kelly having sex with an underage girl, which he received from a whistleblower whom he was representing. The video would later be used in a criminal trial against Kelly. In March 2019, Avenatti represented six different people with links to Kelly including two alleged victims, two whistleblowers, and two parents of the victims. Avenatti accused Kelly of violating the terms of his bail release, but Avenatti's comments led to no legal trouble for Kelly. Avenatti also criticized Kelly's interview with Gayle King in a series of tweets.

=== Potential 2020 presidential campaign ===
Avenatti expressed interest in running for President of the United States in 2020; he started a political action committee, and held his first fundraiser at the Democratic Wing Ding in August. In September 2018, Avenatti said he would run in 2020 only against Trump or Pence. On November 1, 2018, Avenatti released his first political ad, which urged Americans to vote on November 6, 2018; The Washington Post ranked him a top 15 contender. On December 4, 2018, Avenatti announced that he would not be a candidate for president of the United States in 2020. In a Twitter post, he announced, "I do not make this decision lightly – I make it out of respect for my family."

== Arrests and charges ==
=== Domestic violence complaint but not charged ===
In November 2018, Avenatti was arrested on suspicion of domestic violence. The Los Angeles Police Department (LAPD) later confirmed Avenatti was arrested for felony domestic violence and his bail was set at $50,000. An LAPD spokesperson said that the unidentified victim, at the time, later described as his girlfriend, had "visible injuries" and that the case would be referred to the Los Angeles County District Attorney for prosecution. Minutes after the reports of Avenatti's arrest, the Twitter account of Surefire Intelligence, a company created by Jacob Wohl, seemingly claimed responsibility for the arrest, tweeting a news story about it and adding "Surefire Intelligence strikes again."

Later in November, actress Mareli Miniutti's name was released as the woman alleging domestic violence. The filing stated that Miniutti and Avenatti had been residing together, and alleged that they had gotten into an argument over money before Avenatti hit her in the face with pillows and dragged her across their apartment floor.

Avenatti called the allegations "completely bogus" and "fabricated and meant to do harm to my reputation." Both of his ex-wives issued statements that Avenatti had never been violent toward either of them. The county district attorney declined to press charges, and referred the case to the city attorney for possible misdemeanor charges. On February 1, 2019, the city attorney's office announced that their investigation was complete, and that Avenatti would not be charged.

=== Extortion conviction and sentencing ===
Avenatti's settlement offers in his suit against Nike became so overly aggressive that the prosecutors of his case contended that he was engaging in extortion. Nike had agreed to pay a coach damages to settle a case; however, Avenatti concealed this from the coach because Nike's offer didn't include attorney's fees.

On March 25, 2019, Avenatti was arrested in New York City, and federal prosecutors in the Southern District of New York announced that they were charging Avenatti with attempting to extort up to $25 million from U.S. athletic apparel and shoe company Nike by threatening to make damaging charges against the company. Avenatti allegedly claimed that Nike improperly made payments to families of high school basketball players. The arrest came about 15 minutes after Avenatti announced he would be holding a press conference the next day, at which he claimed he would reveal information about a high school and college basketball scandal involving Nike.

During the afternoon of March 25, Avenatti and an unnamed co-conspirator were scheduled to meet with lawyers from Nike, at which prosecutors allege he would have offered to cancel the press conference in exchange for payment. Avenatti's suspected co-conspirator was identified as Mark Geragos. Avenatti was released on a $300,000 bond that evening.

On February 14, 2020, Avenatti was found guilty on all three counts related to the attempted extortion of Nike. He faced potentially more than 40 years in prison. On July 8, 2021, Judge Paul G. Gardephe sentenced him to 30 months in prison.

=== Fraud and embezzlement conviction and sentencing ===
Also, on March 25, 2019, the U.S. Attorney for the Central District of California, Nicola T. Hanna, announced in Los Angeles the filing of a 197-page complaint accusing Avenatti of wire fraud and bank fraud. The indictment said that Avenatti had embezzled money from a client and had defrauded a Mississippi bank by submitting false tax returns to obtain more than $4 million in loans. Prosecutors also alleged that Avenatti had not filed personal tax returns for the years in question.

On April 10, 2019, Avenatti was charged by a federal grand jury in Santa Ana, California with embezzling funds that NBA player Hassan Whiteside had wired to him in January 2017 to pay a settlement to his ex-girlfriend Alexis Gardner, who was represented by Avenatti. Avenatti was accused of withholding client funds and applying most of the settlement money of $1.75 million, along with his included $1 million fees, to invest $2.5 million in a share of a private jet. He was further accused of misrepresenting Whiteside's settlement payment as monthly installments, which he paid out until June 2018, totaling $194,000. Federal agents subsequently seized a Honda HA-420 twin-engine jet from Santa Barbara Airport co-owned by Avenatti and former client, Indigo Systems co-founder William J. Parrish, as the latter was about to embark on a flight. Parrish successfully sued Avenatti in 2017 for $2.1 million for failure to repay a 2013 loan. Avenatti had not appeared in court to defend himself and appealed that judgment. Avenatti denies the charges.

On April 11, 2019, 36 additional financial crime charges were announced by the U.S. Attorney for the Central District of California. Avenatti is accused of stealing money from clients to purchase a $5 million private jet he co-owned, as well as fraud related to tax documents and banking information. According to U.S. Attorney Hanna, "[m]oney generated from one set of crimes was used to further other crimes, typically in the form of payments designed to string along victims." The purpose of his crimes was "to prevent Mr. Avenatti's financial house of cards from collapsing." Vowing to "fully fight" the additional charges and appealing to the public to presume his innocence, Avenatti stated on Twitter that "For 20 years, I have represented Davids vs. Goliaths and relied on due process and our system of justice. Along the way, I have made many powerful enemies."

Avenatti pleaded guilty on June 16, 2022, and on December 5, 2022, he was sentenced by James V. Selna in a California federal court to 14 years in prison for wire fraud as well as obstruction against the IRS in their effort to collect $5 million in unpaid payroll taxes for Tully's Coffee.

The 9th US Circuit Court of Appeals vacated the sentence on October 23, 2024, because the sentence was based on a greater loss than the actual loss suffered, and sent the matter back down for resentencing. On June 12, 2025, Judge Selna resentenced Avenatti to 135 months (just over 11 years) minus 40 months he had already served for a related case. Avenatti, registration number 86743-054, was incarcerated at Federal Correctional Institution, Terminal Island before being transferred to a Hollywood, California-area halfway house in April 2026.

=== Theft of book proceeds from Stormy Daniels ===
On May 22, 2019, Avenatti was charged with wire fraud and aggravated identity theft as a result of allegations that he stole money from former client Stormy Daniels while helping negotiate her 2018 book deal. Avenatti pleaded not guilty. Avenatti was released on a $300,000 bail bond on the conditions that he notify authorities of any travel plans and that he have no contact with Daniels.

On February 4, 2022, Avenatti was convicted in a New York federal court of identity theft and wire fraud for stealing from Daniels. He was ordered to surrender to U.S. Marshals by February 7. In May 2022, Avenatti's attorneys submitted a letter of apology to Daniels saying he was "truly sorry", and that he failed her in many respects.

On June 2, 2022, Avenatti was sentenced to four years in prison with 2 1/2 years consecutive to the 2 1/2 years he is already serving from his previous fraud conviction.

=== State Bar of California proceeding and disbarment ===
On June 5, 2019, the State Bar of California filed with the California State Bar Court a 573-page application under the California Business and Professions Code section 6007(c)(2), to involuntarily enroll Avenatti as an inactive member of the bar. The State Bar Court is the court that decides whether a California attorney committed professional misconduct worthy of discipline, up to and including disbarment. The State Bar contends that the evidence submitted with the petition establishes that Avenatti has committed professional misconduct that has caused or is causing substantial harm to Avenatti's clients or the public. There is a substantial probability that Avenatti's professional misconduct will result in his disbarment. If the State Bar Court finds sufficient evidence to place Avenatti on involuntary inactive enrollment, the State Bar must initiate disciplinary proceedings within 45 days of the effective date of the order. If the State Bar Court rules on disbarment, the California Supreme Court must review and approve it.

Avenatti was disbarred on February 5, 2025.

=== January 2020 arrest ===
Avenatti was again arrested on January 14, 2020, during a recess in court for his disbarment proceedings, for violating the terms of a previous release, and was expected to appear in federal court in Santa Ana, California, on January 15.

According to The Wall Street Journal, Avenatti was scheduled to face trial in New York on charges of attempting to extort millions from Nike when a federal judge in California ordered him jailed until his trial in California. Prosecutors in California accused Avenatti of violating the conditions of his release by committing a series of financial crimes while free on bond: structuring currency transactions to avoid reporting requirements and concealing his personal assets from his creditors. U.S. Marshals were prepared to take Avenatti to Manhattan as early as January 17, 2020, for his trial on the New York charges. Avenatti's trial on the California charges was scheduled for the following May.

== Personal life ==
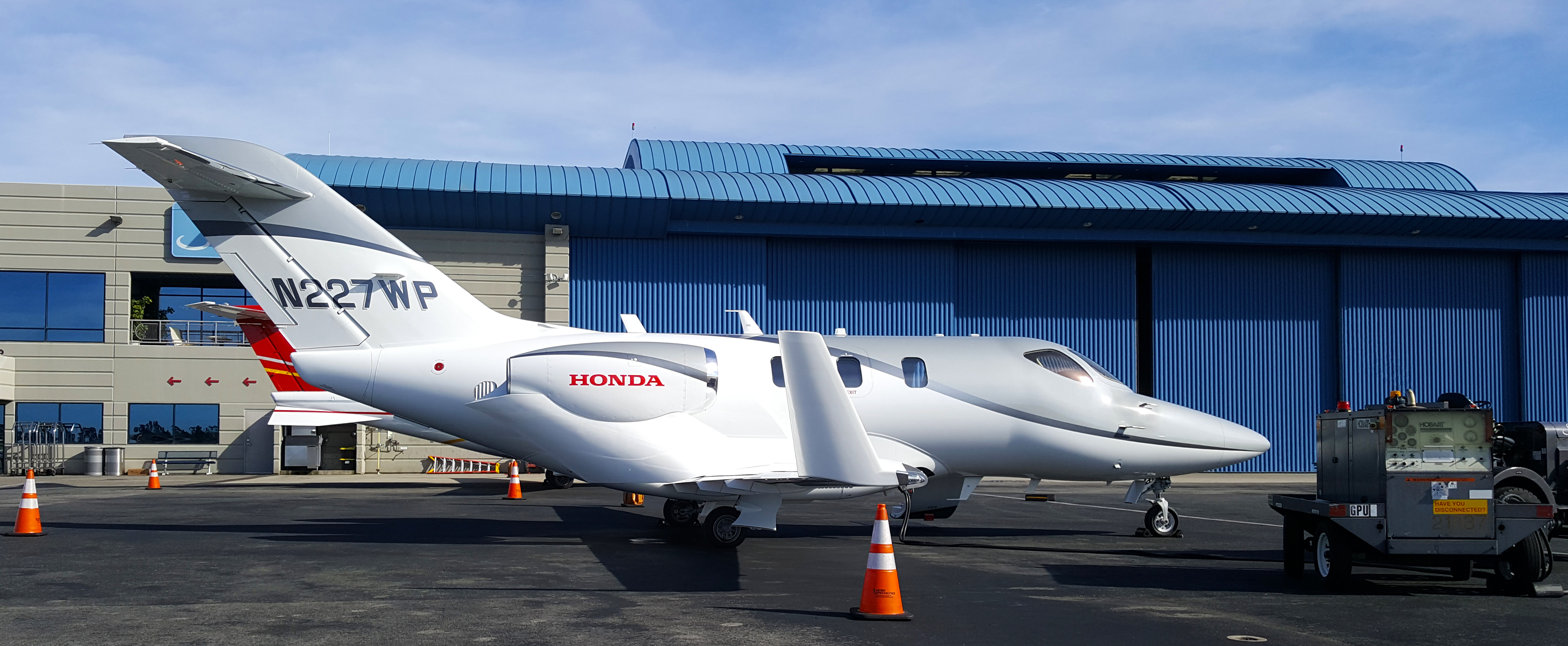
2015 Honda HA-420 HondaJet N227WP co-owned by Avenatti

Avenatti was married for 13 years to Christine Carlin, with whom he has two daughters.

He married Lisa Storie in 2011. They have one son. Lisa Storie-Avenatti filed for divorce in December 2017. On November 30, 2018, the couple signed a temporary agreement which required Avenatti to sign over certain possessions and pay $40,000 a month in family support, with the first payment being due by December 3, 2018. In December 2018, it was reported that Avenatti had agreed to pay Lisa $1,947,540 in child and spousal support, and to transfer ownership of several assets to her, including five luxury wristwatches, a Frank Gehry sculpture, other artwork, and a leased 2017 Ferrari 488 Spider, while his law firm would transfer to Lisa its interest in a 2015 Honda private jet. He responded to the reports, calling them "bogus". The jet was later confiscated by federal agents at the Santa Barbara airport on April 10, 2019, during an asset seizure based on the tax, wire, and bankruptcy fraud indictment filed in the U.S. Central District Court of California.
