= Pepsi, Where's My Jet? =

Documentary miniseries about Leonard v. Pepsico, Inc.

- Promotional poster
- Genre: Documentary
- Directed by: Andrew Renzi
- Composer: Chase Deso
- Country of origin: United States
- Original language: English
- No. of seasons: 1
- No. of episodes: 4

Production
- Executive producers: Andrew Renzi; Andrew Corkin; Nick Boak; Theo James; Andrew Fried; Jordan Wynn; Dane Lillegard; Sarina Roma
- Running time: 36–43 minutes
- Production company: Boardwalk Pictures

Original release
- Network: Netflix
- Release: November 17, 2022

Pepsi, Where's My Jet? is an American Netflix original docuseries directed by Andrew Renzi. Its story explores the Leonard v. Pepsico, Inc. court case. It premiered on Netflix on November 17, 2022.

== Background ==
In the mid-1990s, PepsiCo aired a series of commercials aiming to promote their Pepsi products and associated point system. According to this system, purchasing Pepsi products allowed customers to collect points that could be used to claim prizes such as T-shirts or sunglasses. One commercial showed that, for seven million points, the prize was an AV-8B Harrier II jet. Its value at the time was estimated at US$32 million. (Note: $65,690,600 in 2025 dollars)

While Pepsi later claimed the commercial was tongue-in-cheek, it lacked a disclaimer indicating so. John Leonard, a 21-year-old business student in 1996, found that it was possible to purchase Pepsi Points for 10 cents each: thus seven million points cost US$700,000. (Note: $1,437,000 in 2025 dollars) The rules only required a minimum of 15 Pepsi Points worth of physical tags from Pepsi products beyond the purchased points.

Leonard convinced five investors to help him buy the remaining points. One of these investors was Todd Hoffman. Leonard sent his points and a check to claim the jet. PepsiCo denied his request and argued that the commercial was a joke. They pointed out that the jet was not an item offered in their catalog of products that can be obtained with Pepsi Points.

After initially being sued by PepsiCo in the Southern District of New York, in an effort to establish a favorable venue, Leonard filed a lawsuit in Miami accusing PepsiCo of breach of contract, fraud, deceptive and unfair trade practices, and misleading advertising. He hired political strategist—and later celebrity attorney—Michael Avenatti to be a part of his team. Meanwhile, the company requested that Leonard's claim be deemed frivolous. The lawsuit became known as Leonard v. Pepsico, Inc. and was eventually transferred to a federal court in Manhattan in the Southern District of New York.

In September 1997, the Pentagon announced that the jets were not for sale and would need to be "demilitarized" before being offered to the public. In August 1999, judge Kimba Wood ruled in favor of PepsiCo with the argument that "no objective person could reasonably have concluded that the commercial actually offered consumers a Harrier jet". The company later updated their commercial to increase the number of Pepsi Points required for the jet from seven million to 700 million.

== Production ==
The title of the series was inspired by the comedy film Dude, Where's My Car? (2000). Director Andrew Renzi was initially offered Pepsi, Where's My Jet? as a work of fiction, but shifted to making a documentary after contacting Leonard, who by that point was working as a park ranger in Alaska. Following the success of Tiger King amid the COVID-19 lockdowns in 2020, producers became interested in making more documentaries about "weird historical stories".

Leonard had intended to "keep [the lawsuit] back there, as something funny that happened a long time ago" and turned down several producers who wanted to work with him, but he accepted to work with Renzi because he felt that Renzi was "really sincere". Leonard also discussed the matter with Hoffman, with whom he remained friends, and Hoffman told him that the story "needs to be told." The relationship between Leonard and Hoffman was Renzi's "guiding post" while making the series. Leonard's strategist and legal consultant Michael Avenatti filmed his segments while under house arrest for attempted extortion.

== Summary ==
Over four episodes, Pepsi, Where's My Jet? features interviews with Leonard, Hoffman, PepsiCo executives, and public figures such as Cindy Crawford and Manny Pacquiao. It includes reenactments with actors portraying younger versions of Leonard and Hoffman. The fourth episode also documents Pepsi's Number Fever promotional campaign in the Philippines which resulted in at least five deaths in 1992.

== Episodes ==
No.	Title	Directed by	Original release date
1	"The Kid from Seattle"	Andrew Renzi	November 17, 2022
2	"Let's Make a Deal"	Andrew Renzi	November 17, 2022
3	"The Bad News Bears"	Andrew Renzi	November 17, 2022
4	"Landing the Plane"	Andrew Renzi	November 17, 2022

== See also ==
- Pepsi Number Fever, Philippines, 1992
