= 2006 Nextel All-Star Challenge =

22nd iteration of the NASCAR All-Star Race

Race details
- Date: May 20, 2006
- Location: Concord, North Carolina, Lowe's Motor Speedway
- Course: Permanent racing facility 1.5 mi (2.4 km)
- Distance: Open: 30 laps, 45 mi (72 km); All-Star Challenge: 90 Laps, 135 mi (217 km); Segment 1: 40 laps Segment 2: 30 laps Segment 3: 20 laps
- Avg Speed: Open: 95.801 mph (154.177 km/h); All-Star Challenge: 103.294 mph (166.236 km/h)

Nextel Open
- Pole: Scott Riggs (MBV Motorsports)
- Time: 28.953
- Winner: Scott Riggs (MBV Motorsports)
- Fan Vote winner: Kyle Petty (Petty Enterprises)

Nextel All-Star Challenge
- Pole: Kasey Kahne (Evernham Motorsports)
- Pole: 2:02.296
- Most laps led: Jimmie Johnson (Hendrick Motorsports)
- Laps led: 33
- Winner: Jimmie Johnson (Hendrick Motorsports)

Television
- Network: FX
- Announcers: Mike Joy, Larry McReynolds, Darrell Waltrip
- Network: Motor Racing Network

The 2006 Nextel All-Star Challenge was the second exhibition stock car race of the 2006 NASCAR Nextel Cup Series and the 22nd iteration of the event. The race was held on Saturday, May 20, 2006, in Concord, North Carolina at Lowe's Motor Speedway, a 1.5 miles (2.4 km) permanent quad-oval. The race took the scheduled 90 laps to complete. At race's end, Jimmie Johnson, driving for Hendrick Motorsports, would dominate the late stages of the race to win $1 million and his second Nextel All-Star Challenge. To fill out the podium, Kevin Harvick, driving for Richard Childress Racing, and Jeff Gordon, driving for Hendrick Motorsports, would finish second and third, respectively.

In the preliminary Nextel Open, MBV Motorsports driver Scott Riggs would dominate the race to move on to the main Nextel All-Star Challenge. Meanwhile, Petty Enterprises driver Kyle Petty would win the fan vote to move onto the Nextel All-Star Challenge.

== Background ==
The layout of Lowe's Motor Speedway, the venue where the race was held.

Lowe's Motor Speedway is a motorsports complex located in Concord, North Carolina, United States 13 miles from Charlotte, North Carolina. The complex features a 1.5 miles (2.4 km) quad oval track that hosts NASCAR racing including the prestigious Coca-Cola 600 on Memorial Day weekend and the NEXTEL All-Star Challenge, as well as the UAW-GM Quality 500. The speedway was built in 1959 by Bruton Smith and is considered the home track for NASCAR with many race teams located in the Charlotte area. The track is owned and operated by Speedway Motorsports Inc. (SMI) with Marcus G. Smith (son of Bruton Smith) as track president.

=== Format and eligibility ===
The 90 laps of the Nextel All-Star Challenge was divided into three segments. Caution laps between segment breaks were not counted. The first segment was 40 laps long. Mandatory 10-minute pit stops/breaks were implemented in between both segment breaks. During the first 10-minute break, a random ping pong ball (each ball would have one NASCAR on Fox announcer or pit reporter on it) picked by Chris Myers would lead Myers to open a giant, promotional Nextel flip phone of the corresponding announcer. Each phone had a number that would decide how many cars would be inverted to start Segment 2, a 30-lap segment. After the second 10-minute break, drivers would race in a 20-lap shootout to decide the winner of the Nextel All-Star Challenge.

Drivers who had won in the previous season and the first 11 eleven races of the current season were automatically eligible to qualify for the Nextel All-Star Challenge. In addition, previous champions and former Nextel All-Star Challenge winners within the last 10 years (1995-2004) were also automatically eligible.

Teams who were not automatically eligible to qualify, but still wanted to have a chance at entering the Nextel All-Star Challenge were made to race in a qualifying race called the Nextel Open, a 30-lap shootout event where the winner of the event would qualify to race in the Nextel All-Star Challenge. Teams who were in the Top 50 in the 2005 NASCAR Nextel Cup Series owner's points standings were allowed to race in the Nextel Open. In addition, a televote was made open to the public where the driver who got the most votes from the public would also qualify to move on to the Nextel All-Star Challenge.

=== Entry list ===
- (R) denotes rookie driver.

==== Nextel Open ====
#	Driver	Team	Make	Sponsor
00	Hermie Sadler	MBA Racing	Ford	The ACE and TJ Show
1	Martin Truex Jr. (R)	Dale Earnhardt, Inc.	Chevrolet	Bass Pro Shops, National Wild Turkey Federation
01	Joe Nemechek	MB2 Motorsports	Chevrolet	U.S. Army
4	Scott Wimmer	Morgan–McClure Motorsports	Chevrolet	Aero Exhaust
7	Robby Gordon	Robby Gordon Motorsports	Chevrolet	Jim Beam Black
07	Clint Bowyer (R)	Richard Childress Racing	Chevrolet	Jack Daniel's
10	Scott Riggs	MBV Motorsports	Dodge	Valvoline
11	Denny Hamlin (R)	Joe Gibbs Racing	Chevrolet	FedEx Express
14	Sterling Marlin	MB2 Motorsports	Chevrolet	Ginn Resorts
18	J. J. Yeley (R)	Joe Gibbs Racing	Chevrolet	Interstate Batteries
21	Ken Schrader	Wood Brothers/JTG Racing	Ford	U.S. Air Force
22	Dave Blaney	Bill Davis Racing	Dodge	Caterpillar
25	Brian Vickers	Hendrick Motorsports	Chevrolet	GMAC
27	Kirk Shelmerdine	Kirk Shelmerdine Racing	Chevrolet	Catdaddy Carolina Moonshine
30	Mike Wallace	Rick Ware Racing	Dodge	Pro 30
31	Jeff Burton	Richard Childress Racing	Chevrolet	Cingular Wireless
32	Travis Kvapil	PPI Motorsports	Chevrolet	Tide
38	Elliott Sadler	Robert Yates Racing	Ford	M&M's
40	David Stremme (R)	Chip Ganassi Racing	Dodge	Lone Star Steakhouse & Saloon
41	Reed Sorenson (R)	Chip Ganassi Racing	Dodge	Target
42	Casey Mears	Chip Ganassi Racing	Dodge	Texaco, Havoline
45	Kyle Petty	Petty Enterprises	Dodge	My Coke Rewards
49	Kevin Lepage	BAM Racing	Dodge	State Water Heaters
51	Mike Garvey	Competitive Edge Motorsports	Chevrolet	Marathon American Spirit Motor Oil
61	Chad Chaffin	Front Row Motorsports	Chevrolet	RoadLoans
66	Jeff Green	Haas CNC Racing	Chevrolet	Haas Automation
78	Kenny Wallace	Furniture Row Racing	Chevrolet	Furniture Row
95	Stanton Barrett	Stanton Barrett Motorsports	Chevrolet	The Race Space
96	Tony Raines	Hall of Fame Racing	Chevrolet	DLP HDTV
Official Nextel Open entry list

==== Nextel All-Star Challenge ====
#	Driver	Team	Make	Sponsor
2	Kurt Busch	Penske Racing South	Dodge	Miller Lite
5	Kyle Busch	Hendrick Motorsports	Chevrolet	Kellogg's
6	Mark Martin	Roush Racing	Ford	AAA
8	Dale Earnhardt Jr.	Dale Earnhardt, Inc.	Chevrolet	Budweiser
9	Kasey Kahne	Evernham Motorsports	Dodge	Dodge Dealers
12	Ryan Newman	Penske Racing South	Dodge	Alltel My Circle
16	Greg Biffle	Roush Racing	Ford	National Guard, Charter
17	Matt Kenseth	Roush Racing	Ford	DeWalt
19	Jeremy Mayfield	Evernham Motorsports	Dodge	Dodge Dealers
20	Tony Stewart	Joe Gibbs Racing	Chevrolet	The Home Depot
24	Jeff Gordon	Hendrick Motorsports	Chevrolet	DuPont Performance Alliance
26	Jamie McMurray	Roush Racing	Ford	Irwin Marathon Saw Blades
29	Kevin Harvick	Richard Childress Racing	Chevrolet	GM Goodwrench
43	Bobby Labonte	Petty Enterprises	Dodge	Go-Gurt
48	Jimmie Johnson	Hendrick Motorsports	Chevrolet	Lowe's
55	Michael Waltrip	Bill Davis Racing	Dodge	NAPA Auto Parts
88	Dale Jarrett	Robert Yates Racing	Ford	UPS
99	Carl Edwards	Roush Racing	Ford	Office Depot
Official Nextel All-Star Challenge entry list

== Practice ==
=== Nextel Open ===
The only practice for Nextel Open drivers was held on Friday, May 19, at 12:00 PM EST. The session would last for one hour and 30 minutes. Jeff Green, driving for Haas CNC Racing, would set the fastest time in the session, with a lap of 29.329 and an average speed of 184.118 miles per hour (296.309 km/h).

Pos.	#	Driver	Team	Make	Time	Speed
1	66	Jeff Green	Haas CNC Racing	Chevrolet	29.329	184.118
2	11	Denny Hamlin (R)	Joe Gibbs Racing	Chevrolet	29.337	184.068
3	18	J. J. Yeley (R)	Joe Gibbs Racing	Chevrolet	29.454	183.337
Full Nextel Open practice results

=== Nextel All-Star Challenge ===
The only practice for Nextel All-Star Challenge drivers was held on Friday, May 19, at 1:50 PM EST. The session would last for one hour and 25 minutes. Kasey Kahne, driving for Evernham Motorsports, would set the fastest time in the session, with a lap of 29.531 and an average speed of 182.859 miles per hour (294.283 km/h).

Pos.	#	Driver	Team	Make	Time	Speed
1	9	Kasey Kahne	Evernham Motorsports	Dodge	29.531	182.859
2	19	Jeremy Mayfield	Evernham Motorsports	Dodge	29.719	181.702
3	16	Greg Biffle	Roush Racing	Ford	29.745	181.543
Full Nextel All-Star Challenge practice results

== Qualifying ==
Qualifying for the Nextel Open was held on Friday, May 19, at 6:05 PM EST. Each driver would have two laps to set a fastest time; the fastest of the two would count as their official qualifying lap.

Scott Riggs, driving for MBV Motorsports, would win the pole, setting a time of 28.953 and an average speed of 186.509 miles per hour (300.157 km/h).

=== Nextel Open ===
Pos.	#	Driver	Team	Make	Time	Speed
1	10	Scott Riggs	MBV Motorsports	Dodge	28.953	186.509
2	11	Denny Hamlin (R)	Joe Gibbs Racing	Chevrolet	28.960	186.464
3	66	Jeff Green	Haas CNC Racing	Chevrolet	29.081	185.688
4	18	J. J. Yeley (R)	Joe Gibbs Racing	Chevrolet	29.178	185.071
5	31	Jeff Burton	Richard Childress Racing	Chevrolet	29.319	184.181
6	21	Ken Schrader	Wood Brothers/JTG Racing	Ford	29.392	183.723
7	25	Brian Vickers	Hendrick Motorsports	Chevrolet	29.393	183.717
8	4	Scott Wimmer	Morgan–McClure Motorsports	Chevrolet	29.421	183.542
9	40	David Stremme (R)	Chip Ganassi Racing	Dodge	29.434	183.461
10	42	Casey Mears	Chip Ganassi Racing	Dodge	29.497	183.070
11	14	Sterling Marlin	MB2 Motorsports	Chevrolet	29.518	182.939
12	96	Tony Raines	Hall of Fame Racing	Chevrolet	29.532	182.852
13	1	Martin Truex Jr. (R)	Dale Earnhardt, Inc.	Chevrolet	29.534	182.840
14	7	Robby Gordon	Robby Gordon Motorsports	Chevrolet	29.537	182.822
15	78	Kenny Wallace	Furniture Row Racing	Chevrolet	29.568	182.630
16	41	Reed Sorenson (R)	Chip Ganassi Racing	Dodge	29.585	182.525
17	01	Joe Nemechek	MB2 Motorsports	Chevrolet	29.680	181.941
18	32	Travis Kvapil	PPI Motorsports	Chevrolet	29.872	180.771
19	07	Clint Bowyer (R)	Richard Childress Racing	Chevrolet	29.875	180.753
20	45	Kyle Petty	Petty Enterprises	Dodge	29.940	180.361
21	49	Kevin Lepage	BAM Racing	Dodge	30.010	179.940
22	95	Stanton Barrett	Stanton Barrett Motorsports	Chevrolet	30.182	178.915
23	22	Dave Blaney	Bill Davis Racing	Dodge	30.519	176.939
24	00	Hermie Sadler	MBA Racing	Ford	30.563	176.684
25	61	Chad Chaffin	Front Row Motorsports	Chevrolet	30.620	176.355
26	30	Mike Wallace	Rick Ware Racing	Dodge	49.060	110.069
27	27	Kirk Shelmerdine	Kirk Shelmerdine	Chevrolet	57.464	93.972
28	51	Mike Garvey	Competitive Edge Motorsports	Chevrolet	2:02.758	43.989
29	38	Elliott Sadler	Robert Yates Racing	Ford	-	-
Official Nextel Open qualifying results

=== Nextel All-Star Challenge ===
Qualifying for the Nextel All-Star Challenge was held on Friday, May 19, at 7:10 PM EST. Each driver would run 3 laps each, with each driver having to do a mandatory pit stop within those three laps.

Kasey Kahne, driving for Evernham Motorsports, would win the pole, setting a time of 2:02.296 and an average speed of 44.155 miles per hour (71.061 km/h).

Pos.	#	Driver	Team	Make	Time	Speed
1	9	Kasey Kahne	Evernham Motorsports	Dodge	2:02.296	44.155
2	48	Jimmie Johnson	Hendrick Motorsports	Chevrolet	2:02.938	43.925
3	2	Kurt Busch	Penske Racing South	Dodge	2:03.235	43.819
4	24	Jeff Gordon	Hendrick Motorsports	Chevrolet	2:03.798	43.619
5	12	Ryan Newman	Penske Racing South	Dodge	2:04.131	43.502
6	16	Greg Biffle	Roush Racing	Ford	2:04.294	43.445
7	17	Matt Kenseth	Roush Racing	Ford	2:04.391	43.411
8	20	Tony Stewart	Joe Gibbs Racing	Chevrolet	2:04.571	43.349
9	29	Kevin Harvick	Richard Childress Racing	Chevrolet	2:05.059	43.180
10	5	Kyle Busch	Hendrick Motorsports	Chevrolet	2:05.216	43.125
11	43	Bobby Labonte	Petty Enterprises	Dodge	2:05.218	43.125
12	88	Dale Jarrett	Robert Yates Racing	Ford	2:07.427	42.377
13	99	Carl Edwards	Roush Racing	Ford	2:07.438	42.374
14	55	Michael Waltrip	Bill Davis Racing	Dodge	2:08.547	42.008
15	26	Jamie McMurray	Roush Racing	Ford	2:08.948	41.877
16	6	Mark Martin	Roush Racing	Ford	2:09.198	41.796
17	8	Dale Earnhardt Jr.	Dale Earnhardt, Inc.	Chevrolet	2:23.713	37.575
18	19	Jeremy Mayfield	Evernham Motorsports	Dodge	2:25.106	37.214
Official Nextel All-Star Challenge qualifying results

== NASCAR Pit Crew Challenge ==
The second iteration of the NASCAR Pit Crew Challenge was held on Wednesday, May 17. Dale Earnhardt, Inc.'s No. 1 team managed to win the event, with the team winning $70,000.

=== Format and eligibility ===
To be eligible to compete, a team either had to win a race in 2005 or 2006, win a previous Nextel All-Star Challenge race, or have won the championship within the last 10 years. The Nextel Open and Fan Vote winners from the 2005 Nextel All-Star Challenge were automatically eligible to enter. 24 teams would compete in a tournament-style bracket with four rounds.

==== Round 1 ====
Round 1 would consist of the 24 teams racing against the clock, two teams at a time, in an individual skills/team competition. The teams with the fastest eight overall team times would move on to Round 2.

There were 4 skills that each team had to individually accomplish with their respective members, along with one team exercise at the end:

Front Tire Changer and Front Tire Carrier: The front tire changer and carriers will start from outside the pit box, attacking the right side of the car first, then moving onto the left. The second tire will be pre-positioned by the carrier at the pit wall. Competitors will use their own air guns, and a five second time penalty will be administered for any lugs not properly installed. Tire changer must hit split timer button on exit of pit box.

Rear Tire Changer and Rear Tire Carrier: The rear tire changer and carriers will start from outside the pit box, attacking the right side of the car first, then moving onto the left. The second tire will be pre-positioned by the carrier at the pit wall. Competitors will use their own air guns, and a five second time penalty will be administered for any lugs not properly installed. Tire changer must hit split timer button on exit of pit box.

Gas Man: The gas man and catch can man will be responsible for filling a car with 18 gallons of non-flammable liquid, using two pre-loaded nine gallon cans. Gas men will start with one fuel can in hand from just over the wall near the left rear of the car, and will be timed through setting the second can down. If the fuel cans are not empty, the competitor will receive a time penalty. The gas man must hit the split timer on exit of pit box.

Jack Man: The jack man, using his own jack, must jack each side of the car high enough to lift both tires off the ground. A NASCAR Nextel Cup Series official will signal when the tires on each side of the car are off the ground. The jack man must start from outside of the pit box with his hands off the jack and must set off each light before hitting the split timer button and leaving his pit box.

40 Yard Push: As soon as each team member finishes their respective station, they can go to the center of the Charlotte Coliseum, where a special 40-yard lane is created. Each team will get to push their own 3,200 pound (without driver) race car across the finish line. Timing will begin when the car starts to move, finishing when the nose of the racing machine crosses the electronic finish line.

==== Round 2 ====
The eight teams that moved on from Round 1 would go against each other, with seeds being based on overall team time. Round 2 would have each team doing the same challenge as Round 1. The team who won against the other would move on to Round 3.

==== Round 3 ====
The four teams that moved on from Round 2 would face off in the semifinals. In this round, the teams would perform a regular four-tire pit stop- whoever won their respective battle would move on to the final.

==== Round 4 ====
The two teams that moved on from Round 3 would face off in the final. Similar to Round 3, the teams would perform a regular four-tire pit stop- whoever won the final won the challenge.

=== Bracket ===
Quarterfinals
1	No. 1 of Dale Earnhardt, Inc.	Won
8	No. 6 of Roush Racing	Lost
4	No. 12 of Penske Racing South	Lost
5	No. 19 of Evernham Motorsports	Won
2	No. 99 of Roush Racing	Won
7	No. 26 of Roush Racing	Lost
3	No. 20 of Joe Gibbs Racing	Lost
6	No. 9 of Evernham Motorsports	Won

Semifinals
No. 1 of Dale Earnhardt, Inc.	'Won
No. 19 of Evernham Motorsports	Lost
No. 99 of Roush Racing	Lost
No. 9 of Evernham Motorsports	Won

Finals
No. 1 of Dale Earnhardt, Inc.	Won
No. 9 of Evernham Motorsports	Lost

== Nextel Open results ==
Fin	St	#	Driver	Team	Make	Laps	Led	Status	Winnings
1	1	10	Scott Riggs	MBV Motorsports	Dodge	30	29	running	$53,534
2	3	66	Jeff Green	Haas CNC Racing	Chevrolet	30	0	running	$43,534
3	7	25	Brian Vickers	Hendrick Motorsports	Chevrolet	30	0	running	$39,259
4	2	11	Denny Hamlin (R)	Joe Gibbs Racing	Chevrolet	30	1	running	$37,159
5	4	18	J. J. Yeley (R)	Joe Gibbs Racing	Chevrolet	30	0	running	$36,159
6	9	40	David Stremme (R)	Chip Ganassi Racing	Dodge	30	0	running	$34,159
7	5	31	Jeff Burton	Richard Childress Racing	Chevrolet	30	0	running	$33,159
8	11	14	Sterling Marlin	MB2 Motorsports	Chevrolet	30	0	running	$32,559
9	14	7	Robby Gordon	Robby Gordon Motorsports	Chevrolet	30	0	running	$32,059
10	6	21	Ken Schrader	Wood Brothers/JTG Racing	Ford	30	0	running	$31,809
11	17	01	Joe Nemechek	MB2 Motorsports	Chevrolet	30	0	running	$31,534
12	29	38	Elliott Sadler	Robert Yates Racing	Ford	30	0	running	$31,284
13	19	07	Clint Bowyer (R)	Richard Childress Racing	Chevrolet	30	0	running	$31,034
14	16	41	Reed Sorenson (R)	Chip Ganassi Racing	Dodge	30	0	running	$30,934
15	23	22	Dave Blaney	Bill Davis Racing	Dodge	30	0	running	$30,834
16	18	32	Travis Kvapil	PPI Motorsports	Chevrolet	30	0	running	$30,735
17	21	49	Kevin Lepage	BAM Racing	Dodge	30	0	running	$30,635
18	15	78	Kenny Wallace	Furniture Row Racing	Chevrolet	30	0	running	$30,535
19	12	96	Tony Raines	Hall of Fame Racing	Chevrolet	30	0	running	$30,435
20	13	1	Martin Truex Jr. (R)	Dale Earnhardt, Inc.	Chevrolet	30	0	running	$30,335
21	28	51	Mike Garvey	Competitive Edge Motorsports	Chevrolet	30	0	running	$30,235
22	20	45	Kyle Petty	Petty Enterprises	Dodge	30	0	running	$30,110
23	25	61	Chad Chaffin	Front Row Motorsports	Chevrolet	30	0	running	$30,010
24	22	95	Stanton Barrett	Stanton Barrett Motorsports	Chevrolet	30	0	running	$29,910
25	26	30	Mike Wallace	Rick Ware Racing	Dodge	30	0	running	$29,810
26	24	00	Hermie Sadler	MBA Racing	Ford	30	0	running	$29,710
27	27	27	Kirk Shelmerdine	Kirk Shelmerdine	Chevrolet	23	0	handling	$29,610
28	8	4	Scott Wimmer	Morgan–McClure Motorsports	Chevrolet	19	0	accident	$29,510
29	10	42	Casey Mears	Chip Ganassi Racing	Dodge	3	0	accident	$29,410
Official Nextel Open results

== Nextel All-Star Challenge results ==
Fin	St	#	Driver	Team	Make	Laps	Led	Status	Winnings
1	2	48	Jimmie Johnson	Hendrick Motorsports	Chevrolet	90	33	running	$1,055,007
2	9	29	Kevin Harvick	Richard Childress Racing	Chevrolet	90	23	running	$315,007
3	4	24	Jeff Gordon	Hendrick Motorsports	Chevrolet	90	0	running	$140,007
4	13	99	Carl Edwards	Roush Racing	Ford	90	0	running	$120,007
5	5	12	Ryan Newman	Penske Racing South	Dodge	90	0	running	$105,007
6	11	43	Bobby Labonte	Petty Enterprises	Dodge	90	0	running	$100,007
7	12	88	Dale Jarrett	Robert Yates Racing	Ford	90	0	running	$94,857
8	20	45	Kyle Petty	Petty Enterprises	Dodge	90	0	running	$123,967
9	17	8	Dale Earnhardt Jr.	Dale Earnhardt, Inc.	Chevrolet	90	0	running	$92,857
10	19	10	Scott Riggs	MBV Motorsports	Dodge	90	0	running	$145,391
11	7	17	Matt Kenseth	Roush Racing	Ford	72	0	accident	$90,833
12	8	20	Tony Stewart	Joe Gibbs Racing	Chevrolet	72	2	accident	$109,833
13	6	16	Greg Biffle	Roush Racing	Ford	50	0	accident	$98,833
14	1	9	Kasey Kahne	Evernham Motorsports	Dodge	48	10	accident	$113,333
15	16	6	Mark Martin	Roush Racing	Ford	48	1	accident	$87,733
16	10	5	Kyle Busch	Hendrick Motorsports	Chevrolet	48	21	accident	$162,483
17	18	19	Jeremy Mayfield	Evernham Motorsports	Dodge	48	0	accident	$87,383
18	15	26	Jamie McMurray	Roush Racing	Ford	48	0	accident	$87,283
19	14	55	Michael Waltrip	Bill Davis Racing	Dodge	43	0	accident	$87,183
20	3	2	Kurt Busch	Penske Racing South	Dodge	33	0	engine	$92,083
Official Nextel All-Star Challenge results
