= Kimba Wood =

American judge (born 1944)

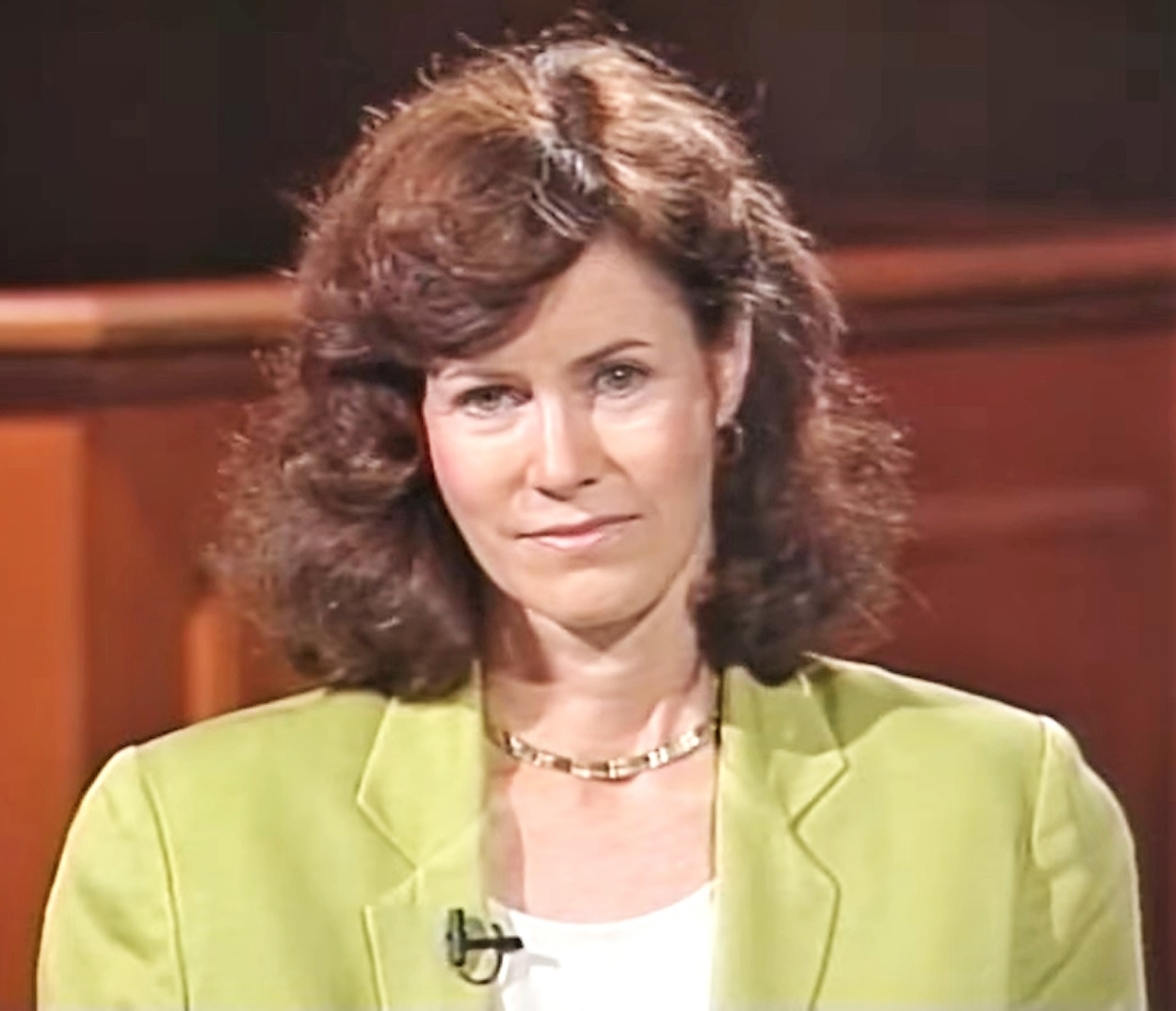
- Wood in 1991

Senior Judge of the United States District Court for the Southern District of New York
- Incumbent
- Assumed office June 1, 2009

Chief Judge of the United States District Court for the Southern District of New York
- In office August 1, 2006 – June 1, 2009
- Preceded by: Michael Mukasey
- Succeeded by: Loretta A. Preska

Judge of the United States District Court for the Southern District of New York
- In office April 20, 1988 – June 1, 2009
- Appointed by: Ronald Reagan
- Preceded by: Constance Baker Motley
- Succeeded by: Vincent L. Briccetti

Personal details
- Born: Kimba Maureen Wood; January 21, 1944 (age 82) Port Townsend, Washington, U.S.
- Party: Democratic
- Education: Connecticut College (BA); London School of Economics (MSc); Harvard University (JD)

Kimba Maureen Wood (born January 21, 1944) is an American judge who is a senior district judge of the United States District Court for the Southern District of New York.

Wood received her undergraduate education at Connecticut College before gaining an MSc at the London School of Economics. In 1969, she earned a J.D. from Harvard Law School. She was appointed by President Ronald Reagan to the U.S. District Court for the Southern District of New York, from which she took senior status in 2009. In 1993, President Bill Clinton unsuccessfully nominated Wood to be United States Attorney General.

Wood has presided over many high-profile cases involving such figures as "Junk Bond King" Michael Milken, Republican majority leader of the New York State Senate Dean Skelos, and Donald Trump's personal attorney, Michael Cohen.

== Early life and education ==
Wood was born in Port Townsend, Washington. Wood was named for the small town of Kimba, South Australia, which her mother saw in an atlas. Her father was a career officer and speechwriter in the United States Army. Wood lived in Europe during her youth, where her father was stationed in several places, and she received early education at the Sorbonne.

In 1965, Wood graduated from Connecticut College with a bachelor's degree in government, cum laude. In 1966, she received a Master of Science in political theory from the London School of Economics. While in London, she spent five days training as a Playboy bunny, but quit before beginning to work at a club. She then earned a Juris Doctor from Harvard Law School in 1969, where there were fewer than twenty women in her class.

== Career ==
From 1969 to 1970, Wood was in private practice in Washington, D.C., working at Steptoe & Johnson where she was the only female attorney. From 1970 to 1971, she worked at the Office of Economic Opportunity. After relocating to New York City in 1971, Wood returned to private practice from 1971 to 1988, working as an antitrust law expert at the firm of LeBoeuf, Lamb, Leiby & MacRae. She became one of the first women to break into the male-dominated world of antitrust law, and became partner at LeBoeuf in 1978.

=== Federal judicial service ===
On December 18, 1987, based upon a recommendation from Senator Al D'Amato, Wood was nominated by President Ronald Reagan to a seat on the United States District Court for the Southern District of New York vacated by Judge Constance Baker Motley. Wood was confirmed by a unanimous United States Senate on April 19, 1988, and received her commission on April 20, 1988. She entered on duty on July 28, 1988. Wood was a member of the Judicial Conference of the United States from 2006 to 2007. She served as Chief Judge from 2006 to 2009 and assumed senior status on June 1, 2009.

=== Proposed nomination as Attorney General ===
In the Nannygate matter of 1993, Wood was Bill Clinton's second unsuccessful choice for United States Attorney General. Like Clinton's previous nominee, Zoë Baird, Wood had hired an illegal immigrant as a nanny, but unlike Baird, she had paid the required taxes on the employee's wages. Wood employed the immigrant at a time when it was legal to do so, before the Immigration Reform and Control Act of 1986 made the hiring of undocumented immigrants unlawful. The threat of a repetition of the same controversy nevertheless led to the withdrawal of Wood from consideration. Janet Reno was later nominated and confirmed for the post. White House officials said they were angry at Wood because she had not told Clinton and other officials about the nanny, even when she had been directly asked. In her statement, however, Wood said she had not misled the White House.

=== Notable cases ===
One of Wood's notable decisions was sentencing Michael Milken, known as "The Junk Bond King", in 1990 to ten years in prison. In 1991, Milken's sentence was reduced to two years' imprisonment and three years' probation at the request of prosecutors, to reward his cooperation in other investigations.

In 1998, Wood presided over the case of the Greek Orthodox Patriarchate of Jerusalem v. Christie's, Inc., in which the ownership of the Archimedes Palimpsest was disputed. Wood also later presided over Leonard v. Pepsico, Inc., 88 F. Supp 2d 116 (S.D.N.Y. 1996), more widely known as the Pepsi Points Case.

On July 8, 2010, Wood was the presiding judge over the US case against ten alleged Russian 'illegals' involved in the Illegals Program. She accepted the defendants' guilty pleas and sentenced all ten to time served. The ten were then deported and exchanged for four prisoners previously held in Russia.

On October 26, 2010, Wood issued an injunction in Arista Records LLC v. Lime Group LLC, forcing LimeWire to disable "the searching, downloading, uploading, file trading and/or file distribution functionality, and/or all functionality" of its software. A trial investigating the damages necessary to compensate the affected record labels was held in 2011 and ended in a negotiated settlement.

On November 19, 2010, Wood received attention in connection with a letter to the court from Bennet M. Epstein, an attorney, who asked for time off from a trial to attend his then-unborn grandson's bris, if the baby proved to be a boy. In response, Wood wrote that Epstein would be permitted to attend the bris, but that "if a daughter is born, there will be a public celebration in court, with readings from poetry celebrating girls and women."

In 2016, Wood presided over the case against Dean Skelos, Republican majority leader of the New York State Senate, who was accused of federal corruption charges.

In April 2018, Wood was assigned to preside over motions arising out of the search pursuant to warrant of the home and office of Michael Cohen, a personal attorney for Donald Trump.

== Personal life ==
In 1970, Wood married Robert Lovejoy, a partner at Davis Polk & Wardwell. She went by the name Kimba Wood Lovejoy from 1970 to 1982, until the time of their divorce. In 1982, Wood married Time magazine political columnist Michael Kramer. They had a son, Ben, in 1986. Wood allegedly had an affair with Frank E. Richardson II, the details of which were detailed in his diaries; those diaries came to light during divorce proceedings between Richardson and his first wife Nancy. The revelations resulted in the breakdown of Wood's marriage to Kramer, and earned her the nickname "The Love Judge". Wood and Richardson married in 1999.

== Leadership roles ==
- 2000–2001: Amherst College Board of Trustees
- Harvard Law School Association of New York City, President (one-year term)

== Works and publications ==
- Wood, Kimba M. (January 1993). "Transitional Advisory Guidelines". Federal Sentencing Reporter. 5 (4): 191. doi:10.2307/20639550. ISSN 1053-9867. JSTOR 20639550. OCLC 5546979730.
- Wood, Kimba M. (May 1994). "Verbatim: The front end of the problem: Salvaging the next generation of children" (Excerpt of Commencement address). Connecticut College Magazine. 3 (6). Connecticut College: 18–19.
- Wood, Kimba M. (1996). "Reexamining the Access Doctrine". Southern California Law Review. 63 (3). ISSN 0038-3910. OCLC 90888693.
- Wood, Kimba M.; Hayes, Roger S.; Carroll, John (November 1990). "United States v. Michael Milken, (S) 89 Cr. 41 (KMW) (S.D.N.Y. November 21, 1990)". Federal Sentencing Reporter. 3 (3): 158–166. doi:10.2307/20639317. ISSN 1053-9867. JSTOR 20639317. OCLC 5546984287.

Legal offices
Preceded by Constance Baker Motley	Judge on the United States District Court for the Southern District of New York; 1988–2009	Succeeded by Vincent L. Briccetti
Preceded by Michael Mukasey	Chief Judge on the United States District Court for the Southern District of New York; 2006–2009	Succeeded by Loretta A. Preska
