= EDIETS =

EDIETS may refer to:

- eDiets.com, an online dietary service website.
- An acronym for Every Day Is Exactly the Same, a Nine Inch Nails single.
