= Halvey =

Halvey is an Irish surname. Notable people with the surname include:

- Eddie Halvey (born 1970), Irish rugby union player
- Marie Halvey (1895–1967), American film editor

== See also ==
- Haley (surname)
- Halley (surname)
- Harvey (name)
- Havey
