= Transactional Records Access Clearinghouse =

Government data collection and research institute at Syracuse University

- Abbreviation: TRAC
- Established: 1989; 37 years ago
- Locations: Syracuse, New York, U.S.; Washington D.C., U.S.
- Coordinates: 43.0403°N 76.1355°W
- Directors: Sue Long; David Burnham
- Parent organization: Syracuse University
- Staff: ~10
- Website: trac.syr.edu

Transactional Records Access Clearinghouse (TRAC) is a nonprofit and nonpartisan data gathering, data research, and data distribution organization in the S. I. Newhouse School of Public Communications at Syracuse University.

TRAC collects big data from the federal agencies and maintains a database of federal enforcement, staffing and financial data. TRAC also focuses on using the Freedom of Information Act to request such data. The FOIA Project is an initiative of TRAC that monitors federal agency FOIA decisions and practices.

Over the years, TRAC has been cited in hundreds of news articles.

== History ==
TRAC was established in 1989 as a research center and was jointly sponsored by the S.I. Newhouse School of Public Communications and the Martin J. Whitman School of Management at Syracuse University. Susan Long, a statistics associate professor in Whitman School, and veteran New York Times reporter David Burnham served as the founding directors.

Barlett and Steele, who won the Pulitzer Prizes for their story on the Internal Revenue Service in 1975 and 1989, couldn't get the data from IRS and received the data from Long & Burnham instead. This and other inquiries led Long to consider starting an organization dedicated to data collection and analysis.

The website was launched in 1996.

== Research and publications ==
TRAC Webpage on March 3, 2021

TRAC makes data available to the public through a variety of interactive data tools, user-generated reports, and original research reports. TRAC uses a variety of statistical techniques to verify data received from government agencies. Where possible, TRAC compares new data with prior data, other publicly available data, and data from other agencies to ensure consistency and accuracy. TRAC works with academic researchers to facilitate more sophisticated research projects. The data warehouse and the specialized data mining tools designed, created and maintained by TRAC are run on SAS software backend.

From its FOIA requests, TRAC adds more than 3 billion new records to its database annually (>250 million records per month). Furthermore more than 300,000 monthly records on civil and criminal proceedings are also obtained.

The TRAC website consists of various subsections that list data from specific government agencies and special projects. These sections include:

- TRACFED offers compiled federal data concerning enforcement (Criminal, Civil, Administrative), staffing, and funding.
- TRAC-FBI provides compiled data information about the FBI, including its staffing and criminal prosecution, enforcement activities and map and tables.
- TRAC-IRS: Data collection from the IRS predates founding of TRAC.
- TRAC-DEA, TRAC-DHS, TRAC-ATF track data related to the specified agencies.
- TRAC-Immigration: TRAC Immigration website was launched in 2006 and contains immigration related written reports, one-click tool access to the latest monthly data on immigration enforcement, library of immigration reports by the Government Accountability Office, Congressional Research Service and inspectors general, and plain English glossary of frequently used words and acronyms. TRAC's immigration court data was featured on an episode of Last Week Tonight with John Oliver. In 2019, TRAC found that immigration data was missing and accused Trump’s Justice Department of systematically deleting immigration court records.
- Judges: TRAC is one of the oldest independent organizations covering federal enforcement and federal judges. In 2014, TRAC launched a Judge Information Tool to provide information on and track Performance of federal district court judges on topics such as disparities in judge asylum decisions. In September 2007, U.S. District Judge Norman A. Mordue ruled against TRAC saying that federal employee information can be withheld by the government from the public. In 2009, a New York Times report cited TRAC data to describe backlogged immigration courts and a 2020 CNN report reported the same issue.

=== FOIA Project ===
The FOIA Project was created by TRAC to track government agencies' responsiveness to public records requests and to document the growing number of FOIA cases litigated in federal court. The Project maintains a public website with information on federal FOIA cases, agency FOIA processing times, a list of the most active FOIA litigators, and research reports written by TRAC researchers. The Project's research on FOIA litigation has been cited by The New York Times and The Washington Free Beacon.

== Evaluation and criticism ==
Kevin Blackwell, a senior research associate at the United States Sentencing Commission criticized TRAC in a 2003 paper in the Federal Sentencing Reporter journal, claiming there were inadequacies and discrepancies in its data.

A 2012 issue of Federal Sentencing Reporter was committed to a debate of TRAC's report and criticisms by federal public defenders.

TRAC has been praised by fellows at the anti-immigration think tank Center for Immigration Studies for the quality of the data it provides on immigration as well as the Federal Courts and federal law enforcement organizations.

== Leadership and staff ==
David Burnham and Susan Long are the founding directors of TRAC. Burham is former New York Times reporter who works from Washington D.C. while Susan Long is the associate professor of managerial statistics in the Martin J. Whitman School of Management at SU. TRAC frequently collaborates with faculties from the S. I. Newhouse School of Public Communications, Maxwell School of Citizenship and Public Affairs, The Knight Chair in Political Reporting, and others.

TRAC employs multiple Resident Faculty Fellows. Annually, many student fellowships are awarded for research purposes. TRAC also provides educational opportunities for Syracuse students in the areas of data analysis, software development, systems administration, research, graphics and instructional design.

== Funding ==
In addition to critical support from Syracuse University, TRAC has been funded by foundations including Carnegie, Ford, Knight, MacArthur, Rockefeller, New York Times, Haas, Open Society, Ethics and Excellence in Journalism Foundation, and the CS Fund. TRAC also charges membership fees from their users to help offset the costs of providing services to academics, reporters, attorneys and others.

== See also ==
- Tully Center for Free Speech
- Burton Blatt Institute
