= Havey =

Havey is a surname (family name) of disputed or unconfirmed origin and varying etymology; purportedly of Irish, English, or French origin and etymology, the name is related to O'Hervery, Harvey, and its derivatives, as well as d'Hevre, d'Havre, and d'Avey. According to some resources, Havey is of Normano-Anglo origin, referring to 'Hae' and 'vy' meaning 'battle-worthy', citing a role in the Norman Conquest. In more Germanic traditions, the name is reputed to relate to the agricultural role of wheat, grain, and milliners.

Notable people called Havey include:

- Allan Havey (born 1954), American stand-up comic and actor
- Julia Griggs Havey (born 1962), American author of several diet books, written after her experience fighting obesity
- Lily Yuriko Nakai Havey, American water color artist and author
- Maie B. Havey, American screenwriter active during the earliest years of Hollywood
- Mark Douglas Havey, physicist

Places or notable locations related to the name may refer to:

- Havey Point, Taunton Bay, Hancock County, Maine
- Macomber's or Havey Landing, Molasses Pond, Eastbrook, Maine
- Havey Beach, Massachusetts

== See also ==
- Night After Night with Allan Havey, unorthodox late night talk show which aired on The Comedy Channel from 1989 to 1992
