= David Burnham =

American investigative journalist (1933–2024)

- Born: David Bright Burnham; January 24, 1933; Boston, Massachusetts, U.S.
- Died: October 1, 2024 (aged 91); Spruce Head, Maine, U.S.
- Education: Harvard University (BA)
- Occupation: Journalist
- Spouses: Sophy Doub (divorced); Joanne Omang (m. 1985)
- Children: 2

David Bright Burnham (January 24, 1933 – October 1, 2024) was an American investigative journalist who worked for The New York Times. His work investigating corruption in the New York Police Department, in which a key source was detective Frank Serpico, served as a basis for the 1973 film Serpico.

== Background ==
Burnham was born in Boston on January 24, 1933, and raised in New Canaan, Connecticut. He served in the U.S. Army in the 11th Airborne Division and 82nd Airborne Division. He studied history at Harvard University.

== Career ==
His career in journalism began in Washington in 1958. He joined The New York Times in 1967, working in New York before returning to Washington. He rose to prominence in 1970 while writing a series of articles for the Times on police corruption, which inspired the 1973 film Serpico. He was also known for writing a series of articles about labor union activist Karen Silkwood, who mysteriously died while en route to meet Burnham to share evidence that the nuclear facility where she worked knew that its workers were exposed to unhealthy levels of plutonium.

Burnham later returned to Washington. In 1986, he left the Times and published several books. He later became the co-director of the Transactional Records Access Clearinghouse, a project of the S.I. Newhouse School of Public Communications at Syracuse University, and continued to be involved with it until his death.

== Personal life and death ==
Burnham and his first wife, writer Sophy Doub, had two children and later divorced. In 1985, he married journalist Joanne Omang.

Burnham owned a vacation home in Spruce Head, Maine. He died there on October 1, 2024, at the age of 91, after choking during a meal.

== Awards and honors ==
- 1968: George Polk Award for Community Service
- 1972: Newspaper Reporters Association of New York City Schaefer Gold Typewriter Award for Public Service
- 1987: Alicia Patterson Foundation Fellowship
- 1990: Investigative Reporters and Editors Award for Best Book: A Law Unto Itself: Power, Politics, and the IRS
- 1992: Rockefeller Foundation Fellowship in Bellagio, Italy
- 2003: John Jay College of Criminal Justice Honorary Doctorate Degree in Humane Letters
- 2006: National Freedom of Information Act Hall of Fame Inductee

== Bibliography ==
=== Books ===
External videos
- Booknotes interview with Burnham on A Law Unto Itself, February 11, 1990, C-SPAN

- The Rise of the Computer State. New York: Random House, 1983. ISBN 978-0394514376
- A Law Unto Itself: Power, Politics, and the IRS. New York: Random House, 1989. ISBN 978-0394560977
- Above the Law: Secret Deals, Political Fixes, and Other Misadventures of the U.S. Department of Justice. New York: Scribner, 1996. ISBN 978-0684806990

=== Selected articles ===
- "Graft Paid to Police Here Said to Run Into Millions." The New York Times, April 25, 1970.
- "Death of Plutonium Worker Questioned by Union Official." The New York Times, November 19, 1974.
