= Vincent L. Briccetti =

American judge (born 1954)

Vincent Briccetti
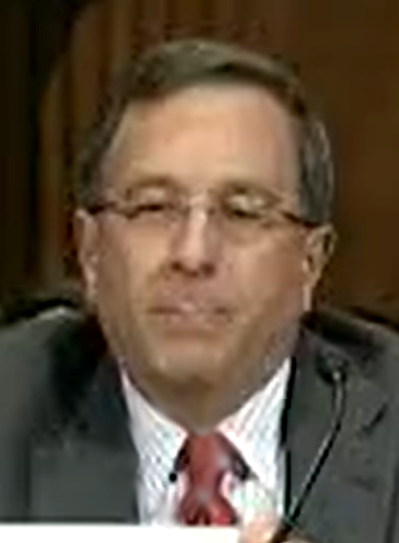

Senior Judge of the United States District Court for the Southern District of New York
- Incumbent
- Assumed office April 21, 2023

Judge of the United States District Court for the Southern District of New York
- In office April 14, 2011 – April 21, 2023
- Appointed by: Barack Obama
- Preceded by: Kimba Wood
- Succeeded by: Margaret Garnett

Personal details
- Born: September 27, 1954 (age 71) Mount Kisco, New York, U.S.
- Education: Columbia University (BA); Fordham University (JD)

Vincent Louis Briccetti (born September 27, 1954) is a Senior United States district judge of the United States District Court for the Southern District of New York.

== Early life and education ==
Born in Mount Kisco, New York, Briccetti graduated from Fox Lane High School in Bedford, New York. He earned an Artium Baccalaureus in 1976 from Columbia University and a Juris Doctor from Fordham University School of Law in 1980. From 1980 until 1982, Briccetti worked as a law clerk for Judge John Matthew Cannella on the United States District Court for the Southern District of New York.

== Career ==
From 1982 until 1984, Briccetti worked as an associate attorney for the now-dissolved New York City law firm Townley & Updike. From 1985 until 1989, Briccetti served as an Assistant United States Attorney in Manhattan. From 1989 until 1992, Briccetti served as an associate attorney for a Stamford, Connecticut law firm. In 1992, Briccetti started his own law firm. From 1992 until 1993, Briccetti worked as a sole practitioner in White Plains, New York and from 1993 he was joined by partners. From 1993 until 2000, he served as a partner in Briccetti & Calhoun, while from 2000 until 2011, he was a partner in Briccetti, Calhoun & Lawrence.

=== Federal judicial service ===
In 2001, Briccetti applied with United States Senator Chuck Schumer for a federal judgeship. Although he was not chosen, he heard from members of Schumer's judicial screening panel from 2002 until 2010 that he was still considered a candidate. In January 2010, the chairman of Schumer's panel asked Briccetti to submit an updated questionnaire to the panel. On November 17, 2010, President Obama nominated Briccetti to a judicial seat on the United States District Court for the Southern District of New York to fill the vacancy created by Judge Kimba Wood's transition to senior status in 2009. On April 12, 2011, the Senate deemed his nomination confirmed by unanimous consent. He received his judicial commission on April 14, 2011. He assumed senior status on April 21, 2023.

=== Notable ruling ===
In December 2018 officials in Rockland County, New York, in the midst of a measles outbreak, banned children who were not vaccinated, from returning to school where the vaccination was less than 95%; parents later sued the county in an effort to allow their students to return to class. On March 14, 2019, Briccetti denied the parents request, ruling that it wasn't in "public interest" to allow the children to go back to school.

Legal offices
Preceded by Kimba Wood	Judge of the United States District Court for the Southern District of New York; 2011–2023	Succeeded by Margaret Garnett
