= Pepsi Number Fever =

1992 Philippines sales promotion

- Logo for the sales promotion
- Date: February – May 25, 1992
- Location: Philippines
- Also known as: 349 incident
- Type: Sales promotion likely as part of the Cola Wars
- Outcome: Market share of Pepsi in the Philippines initially increased from 19.4% to 24.9%. Mistake in ₱1 million grand prize winning bottle cap distribution led to riots and deaths.
- Deaths: 5

Pepsi Number Fever, also known as the 349 incident, was a promotion held by PepsiCo in the Philippines in 1992; the promotion led to riots and the deaths of at least five people.

== Promotion ==
In February 1992, Pepsi Philippines (PCPPI) announced they would print numbers ranging from 001 to 999 inside the caps (crowns) of Pepsi, 7 Up, Mountain Dew and Mirinda bottles. Certain numbers could be redeemed for prizes, which ranged from 100 pesos (about US$4) to 1 million pesos for a grand prize, roughly US$40,000 in 1992, at the time equivalent to 611 times the average monthly salary in the Philippines.

Pepsi allocated a total of US$2 million for prizes. Marketing specialist Pedro Vergara based Pepsi Number Fever on similar, moderately successful promotions previously held in Latin America, Vergara's geographic area of expertise. In April 1992, one month before the 349 incident, a garbled fax led to the wrong winning number being announced on television in Chile, leading to what the Philippine Senate later called a "similar fiasco". The promotion, now known as Numeromania, also later ran in Poland in 1995; however, it did not cause as much controversy.

Pepsi Number Fever was initially successful, increasing Pepsi's monthly sales from $10 million to $14 million and its market share from 19.4% to 24.9%. The winning numbers were announced on television nightly. By May, 51,000 prizes had been redeemed, including 17 grand prizes, and the campaign was extended beyond the originally planned end date of May 8 by another 5 weeks.

== Incident ==
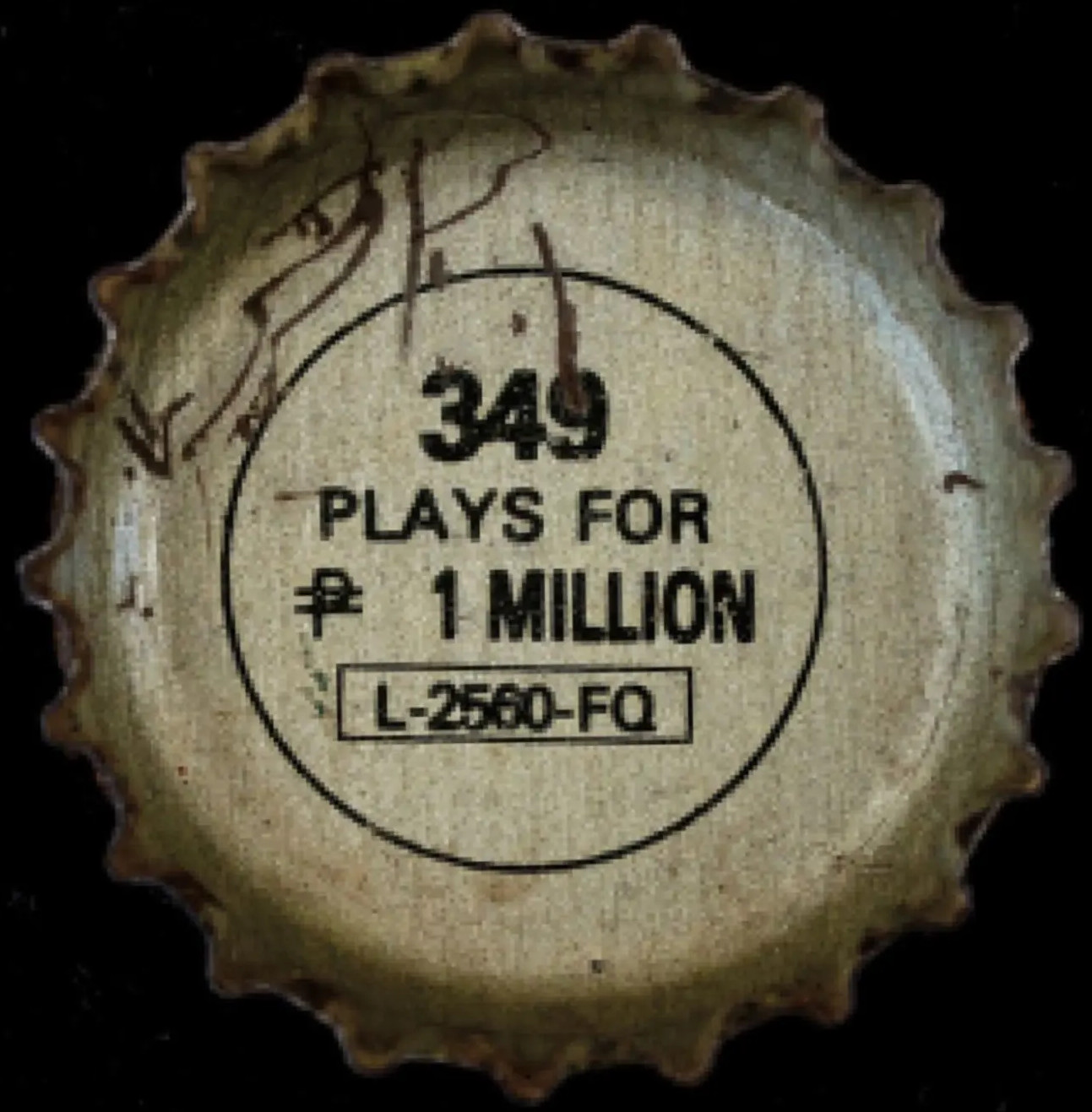
One of the 800,000 "349" bottle caps erroneously announced as a grand prize winner

On May 25, 1992, the ABS-CBN evening news program TV Patrol announced that the grand prize number for that day was 349. Grand prize-winning bottle caps were tightly controlled by PepsiCo. Two bottles with caps with that day's winning number printed inside them and a security code for confirmation had been produced and distributed. However, before the promotion was extended to add new winning numbers, 800,000 regular bottle caps had already been printed with the number 349 but without the security code. Theoretically, these bottle caps were cumulatively worth US$32 billion.

Thousands of Filipinos rushed to Pepsi bottling plants to claim their prizes. PCPPI initially responded that the erroneously printed bottle caps had no confirmation security code and could not be redeemed. The following morning, newspapers announced that the winning number was actually 134, adding to the confusion. After an emergency meeting of PCPPI and PepsiCo executives at 3:00 a.m. on the 27th, the company offered 500 pesos ($18) to holders of mistakenly printed bottle caps as a "gesture of goodwill". This offer was accepted by 486,170 people, costing PepsiCo US$8.9 million (240 million pesos).

== Protests ==
A photograph taken from a protest featuring the 349 Alliance, c. 1992-93

Many irate 349 bottle cap holders refused to accept PCPPI's settlement offer. They formed a consumer group, the 349 Alliance, which organized a boycott of Pepsi products and held rallies outside the offices of PCPPI and the Philippine government. Most protests were peaceful, but on February 13, 1993, a schoolteacher and a 5-year-old child were killed in Manila by a homemade bomb thrown at a Pepsi truck. In May, three PCPPI employees in Davao were killed by a grenade thrown into a warehouse.

PCPPI executives received death threats, and as many as 37 company trucks were overturned, stoned or burned. One of the three men accused by the NBI of orchestrating the bombings claimed they had been paid by Pepsi to stage the attacks to frame the protesters as terrorists. Then-senator Gloria Macapagal Arroyo suggested that the attacks were being perpetrated by rival bottlers attempting to take advantage of PCPPI's vulnerability. The Committee on Trade and Commerce of the Senate of the Philippines accused Pepsi of "gross negligence", noting that it was involved in a similar fiasco in Chile just a month before the 349 incident.

== Legal action ==
About 22,000 people took legal action against PepsiCo. At least 689 civil suits and 5,200 criminal complaints for fraud and deception were filed. In January 1993, Pepsi paid the Department of Trade and Industry a fine of 150,000 pesos for violating the promotion's approved conditions. On June 24, 1996, a trial court awarded the plaintiffs in one of the lawsuits 10,000 pesos (about US$380) each in "moral damages".

Three dissatisfied plaintiffs appealed; on July 3, 2001, the appellate court awarded these three plaintiffs 30,000 pesos (about US$570) each, in addition to attorneys' fees. PCPPI appealed against this decision. The suit reached the Supreme Court of the Philippines, which in 2006 ruled that "PCPPI is not liable to pay the amounts printed on the crowns to their holders. Nor is PCPPI liable for damages thereon", and that "the issues surrounding the 349 incident have been laid to rest and must no longer be disturbed in this decision".

== Legacy ==
To commemorate the promotion, the Ig Nobel Prize, a spoof of the Nobel Prizes organized by the Massachusetts Institute of Technology's Journal of Irreproducible Results, awarded its 1993 Peace Prize to PCPPI for "bringing many warring factions together for the first time in their nation's history".

In the immediate aftermath of the scandal, sales of Pepsi products in the Philippines plunged to 17% of the total market share; however, sales recovered to 21% by 1994.

The number 349 also became strongly associated with the incident, where to be "349ed" became slang for being duped or deceived.

In 2020, during the COVID-19 pandemic, Bloomberg News published a retrospective feature story on the incident in Businessweek, which incorporated accounts from both affected participants and former PepsiCo personnel. In response to a request for comment, PepsiCo issued the following statement to Bloomberg News:

These events took place almost 30 years ago, and none of the executives familiar with this program are at PepsiCo anymore. And given that the Philippines is just emerging from one of the world’s longest Covid lockdowns, we have been unable to access stored records on this matter. We deeply regret any pain and suffering our mistake caused the people of the Philippines.

— PepsiCo

== In popular culture ==
The incident is discussed in the 2022 Netflix documentary Pepsi, Where's My Jet? as a precedent in the Leonard v. Pepsico, Inc. lawsuit in the United States that also involved purportedly false advertising by Pepsi.

== See also ==
- Leonard v. Pepsico, Inc.
- McDonald's Monopoly
- Hoover free flights promotion
- Advertising and marketing controversies in the Philippines
