= Margaret Garnett =

American judge (born 1971)

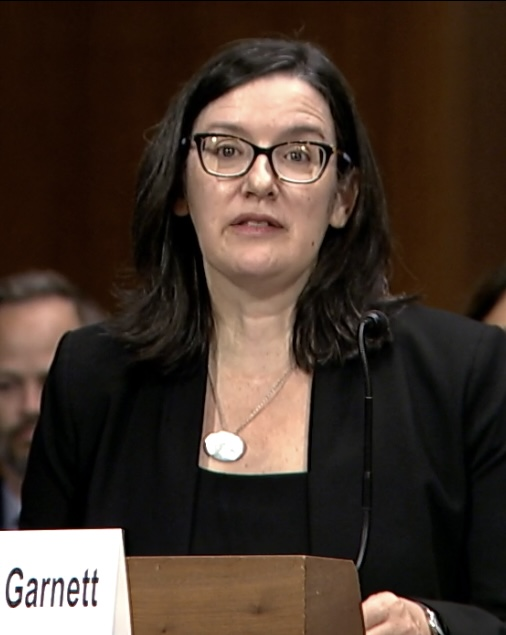

Judge of the United States District Court for the Southern District of New York
- Incumbent
- Assumed office January 9, 2024
- Appointed by: Joe Biden
- Preceded by: Vincent L. Briccetti

Personal details
- Born: 1971 (age 54–55) West Point, New York, U.S.
- Spouse: Seth
- Children: 2
- Education: University of Notre Dame (BA); Yale University (MA, MPhil); Columbia University (JD)

Margaret Merrell Miller Garnett (born 1971) is an American lawyer from New York who is serving as a United States district judge of the United States District Court for the Southern District of New York.

== Education ==
Born in West Point, New York, in 1971, Garnett received a Bachelor of Arts in English and Government from the University of Notre Dame in 1992, a Master of Arts in 1995 and a Master of Philosophy in Political Science in 1997, both from Yale University and a Juris Doctor from Columbia Law School in 2000.

== Career ==
After graduating from law school, Garnett started her career as an associate at Wachtell, Lipton, Rosen & Katz in New York City from 2000 to 2004.

She served as a law clerk for Judge Gerard E. Lynch of the United States District Court for the Southern District of New York.

From 2005 to 2017, Garnett was an Assistant United States Attorney in the U.S. Attorney's Office for the Southern District of New York, which included service as a Chief of the Violent Crimes/Violent and Organized Crime Unit from 2011 to 2014 and as a Chief of Appeals from 2016 to 2017.

During 2017–2018, she served as Executive Deputy Attorney General for Criminal Justice in the New York State Attorney General's Office.

From 2018 to 2021, she was commissioner of the New York City Department of Investigation.

From 2021 to May 2023, she was the deputy United States attorney for the Southern District of New York. From May 2023 to 2024, she served as Special Counsel to the United States attorney in that same district.

=== Federal judicial service ===
Garnett was recommended to the White House by Senator Chuck Schumer. On June 28, 2023, President Joe Biden announced his intent to nominate Garnett to serve as a United States district judge of the United States District Court for the Southern District of New York. On July 11, 2023, her nomination was sent to the Senate. President Biden nominated Garnett to the seat vacated by Judge Vincent L. Briccetti, who assumed senior status on April 21, 2023. On July 26, 2023, a hearing on her nomination was held before the Senate Judiciary Committee. On September 14, 2023, her nomination was reported out of committee by a 12–9 vote. On November 28, 2023, the United States Senate invoked cloture on her nomination by a 49–46 vote. Her nomination was confirmed later that day by a 49–46 vote. She received her judicial commission on January 9, 2024.

=== Notable rulings ===
On January 30, 2026, Judge Garnett ruled that federal prosecutors cannot seek the death penalty and dismissed the death-eligible counts from Luigi Mangione's indictment.

== Personal life ==
Garnett lives in Brooklyn. She and her husband, Seth, a script supervisor, have two children. She is the granddaughter of two generals, and her father served as an Army officer.

Legal offices
Preceded by Vincent L. Briccetti	Judge of the United States District Court for the Southern District of New York; 2024–present	Incumbent
