= My Coke Rewards =

Consumer loyalty program of The Coca-Cola Company

- My Coke Rewards logo
- Website type: Customer loyalty
- Available in: English
- Dissolved: 30 June 2017
- Successor: Coke.com
- Creator: The Coca-Cola Company
- Website: Archived official website at the Wayback Machine (archive index)
- Commercial: Yes
- Registration: Optional
- Launched: 20 February 2006
- Current status: Inactive

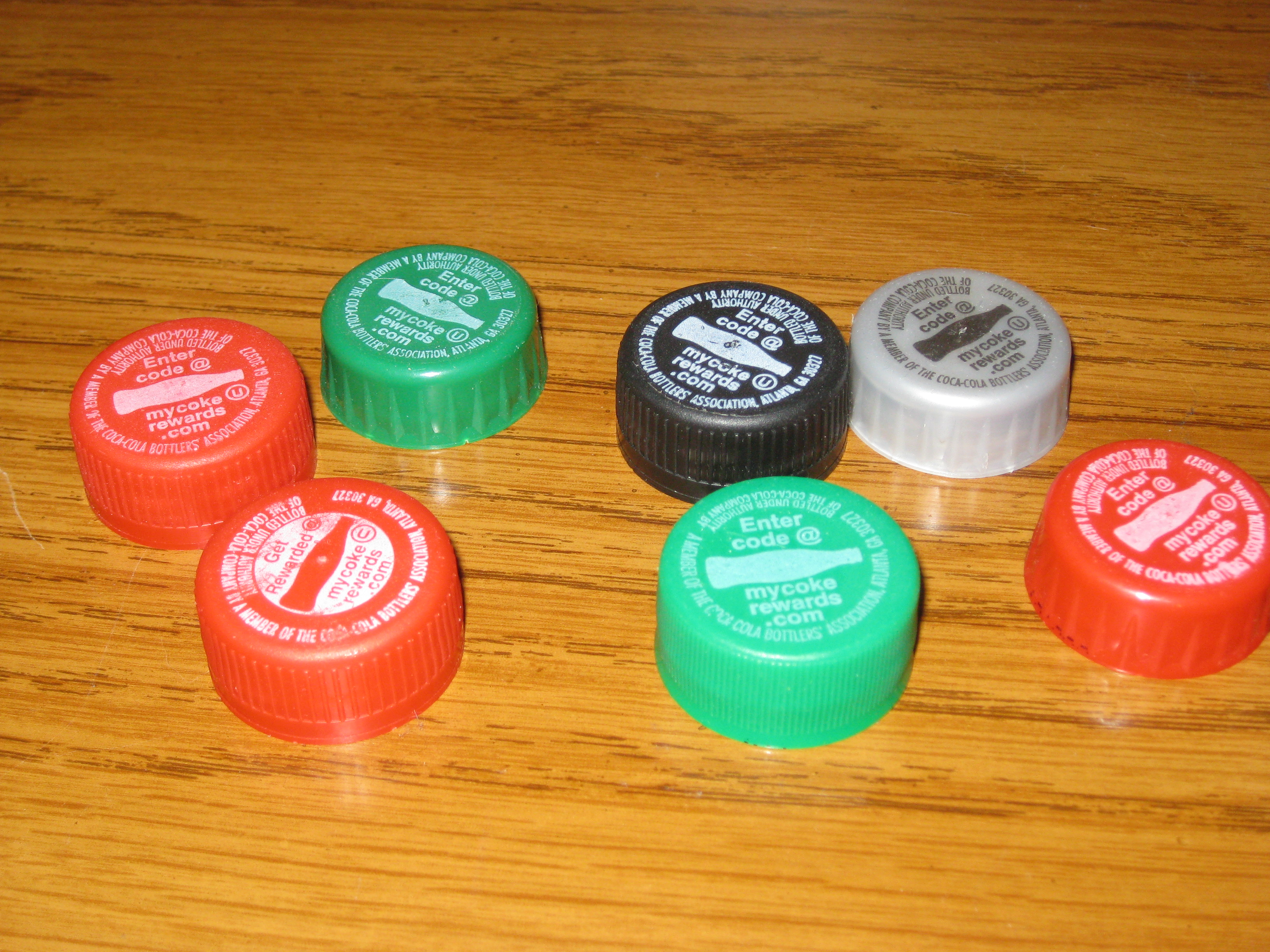
Coca-Cola bottle caps that were eligible for My Coke Rewards; those were awarded 3 points each, while the box tops of 12-packs awarded 10 points each, the 20-packs awarded 18 points each, the 24 or 28-packs awarded 20 points each, and the plastic wraps of 32-packs awarded 25 points each.

My Coke Rewards was a customer loyalty marketing program for The Coca-Cola Company. Customers entered codes found on specially marked packages of Coca-Cola products on a website. Codes could also be entered "on the go" by texting them from a cell phone. These codes were converted into virtual "points" which could in turn be redeemed by members for various prizes or sweepstakes entries. The number of points from each product depended on the brand as well as the item itself.

The program was launched in late February 2006, and ended in late June 2017. By November 2006, over a million prizes had been redeemed. The program had since been extended annually since its inception, but terminated on June 30, 2017. Any points left over from one year by one member carried over into the next, provided the member had accrued or debited points within a 90-day period. Current members had from late March to late June 2017 to redeem any points accumulated over the years. Leftover points were then donated to charity. In September 2013, the My Coke Rewards Beta was launched. The new system which ran on the same website, but with /beta after the .com on the address, used social media challenges and My Coke Rewards codes to gain "status" points to level up, with +5 status points just by creating an account. The levels were bronze, silver, and gold, which replaced the test phase levels of Red, Gold, and Twilight, and points or status were rewarded when a user leveled up. The "status" points were discontinued in mid-June 2016. The program ended in late June 2017.

== Limitations ==
The program always featured limits on the number of codes and points that could be redeemed at one time. Before February 17, 2009, members were limited to entering 10 codes per day, regardless of the number of points that this represented. Members who entered 10 codes from 32-can packages could, under this system, earn a total of 250 points per day, or 1,750 per week. This represented the maximum rate at which points could be accrued without the use of bonus points and similar promotions.

In February 2009, this system was changed. Up until mid-to-late January 2015, members had been limited to entering 100 points per week (through mid-to-late March 2017, 75), regardless of the number of codes redeemed per day (before that, the limit was 120 to early January 2014). Bonus points and promotional offers such as “Double Points Days” were still not subject to this weekly limit. My Coke Rewards had a meter that tells the member how many points they earned during the current week, and whether they have reached the 75 point-per-week limit. Attempts to enter codes that exceed the limit (for example, entering any code which will exceed 75 points) do not cause overflow; the participant was told to “hold on to that code”. (Any bonus points were limited to 2,000 points per week. The limit a member can bank is 10,000 points total weekly.)

Plus, the program had an expiration date on the codes that have been entered, or through end of June 2017. Points expired after that date, meaning a customer had to add points to their account or claim a prize by the deadline.

In the UK version of the program, Coke Zone, customers could also avert point expiration by simply logging on to the website. Their codes are issued on a time-limited basis and expire at the end of the month containing the best before date of the relevant product. This program ended on 15 October 2013, and all points earned were voided at 11:59 pm on that date.

== Code reuse ==
There were two types of codes: single-use and multi-use codes. Single-use codes like those found on Coke products contained a mix of letters and numbers. These codes could only be used once; if they have been entered in any account they will not work again. By contrast, multi-use codes were identified by being all numeric and could be entered by multiple users. The multi-use codes all started with the digits 10008. They had been distributed through email, including during the 2006 Christmas holiday season, as well as through direct mail and print advertising campaigns in various magazines and other publications. Both Blockbuster and Disney (with Pirates of the Caribbean) have participated in such special promotions.

== Controversy ==
The program was one of several marketing campaigns that have come under fire from the Center for Digital Democracy, an advocacy group interested in regulating how food products are marketed to children. Coca-Cola's online marketing techniques were included in a 98-page report issued in May 2007 by the center and the American University called "Interactive Food & Beverage Marketing: Targeting Children and Youth" which criticized the program for collecting personal information from children and for promoting obesity.

Childhood obesity was also a concern for weight-loss instructor Julia Griggs Havey who sued Coca-Cola over the program in 2006, but dropped her lawsuit a few weeks later. The lawsuit was dropped for the specific reason of it being frivolous, since there was a misinterpretation as to what was required of a user in order to accumulate Coke points and obtain the currently available reward prizes. The first assumption—that those who have Coke codes must purchase the product in order to redeem them—was shown to be untrue, as Coke stated they took into consideration that users may obtain codes from others. Second, it was pointed out that the Coca-Cola Company has other products besides Coca-Cola, including Minute Maid juice, Powerade, Powerade Zero and Dasani water, for those who do not wish to consume high amounts of high-fructose corn syrup or caffeine. Additionally, many grocery stores and discount stores offer Coca-Cola products (often imported) that are sweetened with sugar instead of high fructose corn syrup.

Some customers further accused Coca-Cola of utilizing "bait-and-switch" tactics in the program. They claim that the prizes for which they had been saving are either constantly out of stock or are no longer available. Some items experienced steep unexpected price increases, as well; for example the coupons for a free 20 ounce bottle of Coke increased 67% (from 24 points to 40), a $75 Blockbuster gift card which used to cost 722 points went up to 1,020 points (a 41% increase) before being discontinued, a single Napster download went from 35 to 70 points from 2010 to 2011 (and 10 from 350 to 700, a 100% increase), and the price of a GPX docking station went up from 975 points to 1,820 (an 87% increase). These increases took place at the same time as Coca-Cola was taking drastic measures to decrease the number of points awarded (through its February 2009 rule changes which reduced the maximum number of points from 1,750 per week to 75 through 22 March 2017).

For its part, Coca-Cola maintained that all prizes in the My Coke Rewards program are available "while supplies last," and that there was no guarantee expressed or intended that a given prize would either continue to be offered or continue to be offered at the same price.

== See also ==
- Pepsi Stuff — similar program operated by PepsiCo
