= RoadLoans =

- Industry: Financial services
- Founded: 2000
- Headquarters: Dallas, Texas
- Key people: Scott Powell (CEO)
- Products: Auto loans and refinancing, dealer leads services
- Brands: RoadLoans
- Services: Auto Loans
- Parent: Santander Consumer USA Holdings Inc.
- Website: roadloans.com

RoadLoans is a direct-to-consumer auto lender operating online and specializing in subprime auto loans. Established in 2000, RoadLoans finances and services new and used car loans as well as offering auto refinance options.

The Dallas-based company is a provider of subprime auto loans in the United States. It has relationships with automotive dealerships and operates a preferred dealer network in which dealers can receive both consumer leads and financing for customers.

RoadLoans is the online auto lending division of Santander Consumer USA Inc. (“Consumer”), which is a subsidiary of NYSE-listed Santander Consumer USA Holdings Inc. (“Holdings” and together with Consumer collectively referred to herein as “SC”), which is in turn part of the Santander Group.

== History ==
RoadLoans was established in 2000 by Triad Financial Corp., owned by the Ford Motor Credit Co., and in 2005 it was sold to an investment group. RoadLoans was purchased by Santander Consumer USA Holdings Inc. in 2009 as its direct-to-consumer lender.
