= Julia Griggs Havey =

American author

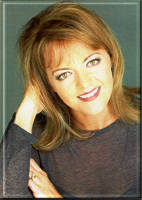
- Julia Havey, 2005
- Born: 1962 (age 63–64); Colorado Springs
- Occupation: Writer
- Writing career
- Notable works: The Vice Busting Diet; Awaken the Diet Within

Julia Griggs Havey (born 1962) is an American author of four diet books, written after her experience with obesity.

== Biography ==
She was born in Colorado Springs, to Colonel Leonard L. Griggs, Jr. and Virginia Spicer. She developed a body weight problem when she was 11 years old.

Havey attended Parkway Central High School, graduating in 1980 and then going on to the University of Missouri, studying communications and journalism. She left college in 1984 to work for TWA as a flight attendant until 1989. Maintaining her weight at the required 125 pounds was difficult, and she often resorted to purging before weight checks.

She met her husband, a union representative, during an airline strike and they married in 1986. Her weight further increased during her pregnancy with her daughter, from 175 to 260 pounds, and then, at age 32, to 290 pounds after the birth of her son. Shortly after that she learned that her husband was having an affair. After divorcing in 1994, she made a series of lifestyle changes and went on to lose 130 pounds. She sent her story to Woman's World magazine, which published it in 1997 under the title Now She Has Her Dream Body!. She went on to write 4 diet books describing her weight-loss regimen, including the autobiographical tale Awaken the Diet Within, published in 2001, "The Vice Busting Diet" published in 2006, and two earlier self-published works (The Easiest Diet I Never Went On and Take Control Recipes). In 1999, she entered and won the "Mrs. Missouri" pageant.

From 1999–2006, she wrote a weekly column for the diet website eDiets.com, holding the title of "master motivator". In January 2007, she was interviewed by Dr. Mehmet Oz on XM satellite radio's "Oprah and Friends"

She currently lives in Nashville, TN with her two children, writes for CBN.com and Diet.com and serves on the board of Turn the Tide Foundation founded by Dr. David L. Katz to fight childhood obesity.

In January 2011, Havey announced that she was launching an anti-obesity campaign and giving out free diet plans.

== Works ==
- The Easiest Diet I Never Went On
- Take Control Recipes
- The Vice Busting Diet (St. Martin's Press) ISBN 0-312-34836-3
- Awaken the Diet Within (Warner Books) ISBN 0-446-69122-4
