= Federal Sentencing Reporter =

- Discipline: Criminal law
- Language: English
- Edited by: Douglas A Berman, Steven Chanenson, Jonathan J Wroblewski

Publication details
- History: 1988–present
- Publisher: Duke University Press (United States)
- Frequency: 5/year

Standard abbreviations
- Bluebook: Fed. Sent'g Rep.
- ISO 4: Fed. Sentencing Report.

Indexing
- ISSN: 1053-9867 (print); 1533-8363 (web)
- LCCN: 88646621
- OCLC no.: 915910518

Links
- Journal homepage

Federal Sentencing Reporter is a law journal published quarterly by Duke University Press. Prior to 2025, the Federal Sentencing Reporter was published by University of California Press, in Berkeley, California for the Vera Institute of Justice.

The Federal Sentencing Reporter was established in 1988 and explores in detail the complex sector of sentencing law, practice, and theory. Each issue is organized around a central topic or theme and will feature articles, cases, and other primary materials written by judges, prosecutors and defense attorneys, probation officers, scholars, and members of sentencing commissions. Along with the presentation of new ideas and viewpoints on existing legislation and sentencing guidelines, the journal examines questions of sentencing policy and the practical application of modern sentencing reforms.

The academic editors of the journal are Douglas A. Berman (Ohio State University Moritz College of Law), Steve Chanenson (Villanova University School of Law), and Jonathan J. Wroblewski.
