= Leonard v. Pepsico, Inc. =

1999 American contract case

Leonard v. PepsiCo, Inc.
- Court: United States District Court for the Southern District of New York
- Full case name: John D.R. Leonard v. Pepsico, Inc.
- Decided: August 5, 1999
- Docket nos.: 96-cv-5320; 96-cv-9069
- Citation: 88 F. Supp. 2d 116

Case history
- Subsequent actions: Affirmed, 210 F.3d 88 (2d Cir. 2000) (per curiam)

Court membership
- Judge sitting: Kimba Wood

Leonard v. Pepsico, Inc., 88 F. Supp. 2d 116, (S.D.N.Y. 1999), aff'd 210 F.3d 88 (2d Cir. 2000), more widely known as the Pepsi Points case, is an American contract law case regarding offer and acceptance. The case was brought in the United States District Court for the Southern District of New York in 1999; its judgment was written by Kimba Wood.

In 1996, PepsiCo began a promotional loyalty program in which customers could earn Pepsi Points which could be traded for physical items. A television commercial for the loyalty program displayed the commercial's protagonist flying to school in a McDonnell Douglas AV-8B Harrier II vertical take off jet aircraft, valued at $37.4 million at the time, which could be redeemed for 7,000,000 Pepsi Points. The plaintiff, John Leonard, discovered these could be directly purchased from Pepsi at 10¢ per point. Leonard delivered a check for $700,008.50 to PepsiCo, attempting to purchase the jet. PepsiCo initially rejected Leonard's offer, citing the humorous nature of the offer in the advertisement. Leonard then sued PepsiCo, Inc. in an effort to enforce the offer and acceptance perceived by Leonard to be made in the advertisement. In her judgment, Wood sided with PepsiCo, noting the frivolous and improbable nature of landing a fighter jet in a school zone that was portrayed by the protagonist. PepsiCo would re-release the advertisement, valuing the jet at 700,000,000 Pepsi Points.

== Background ==
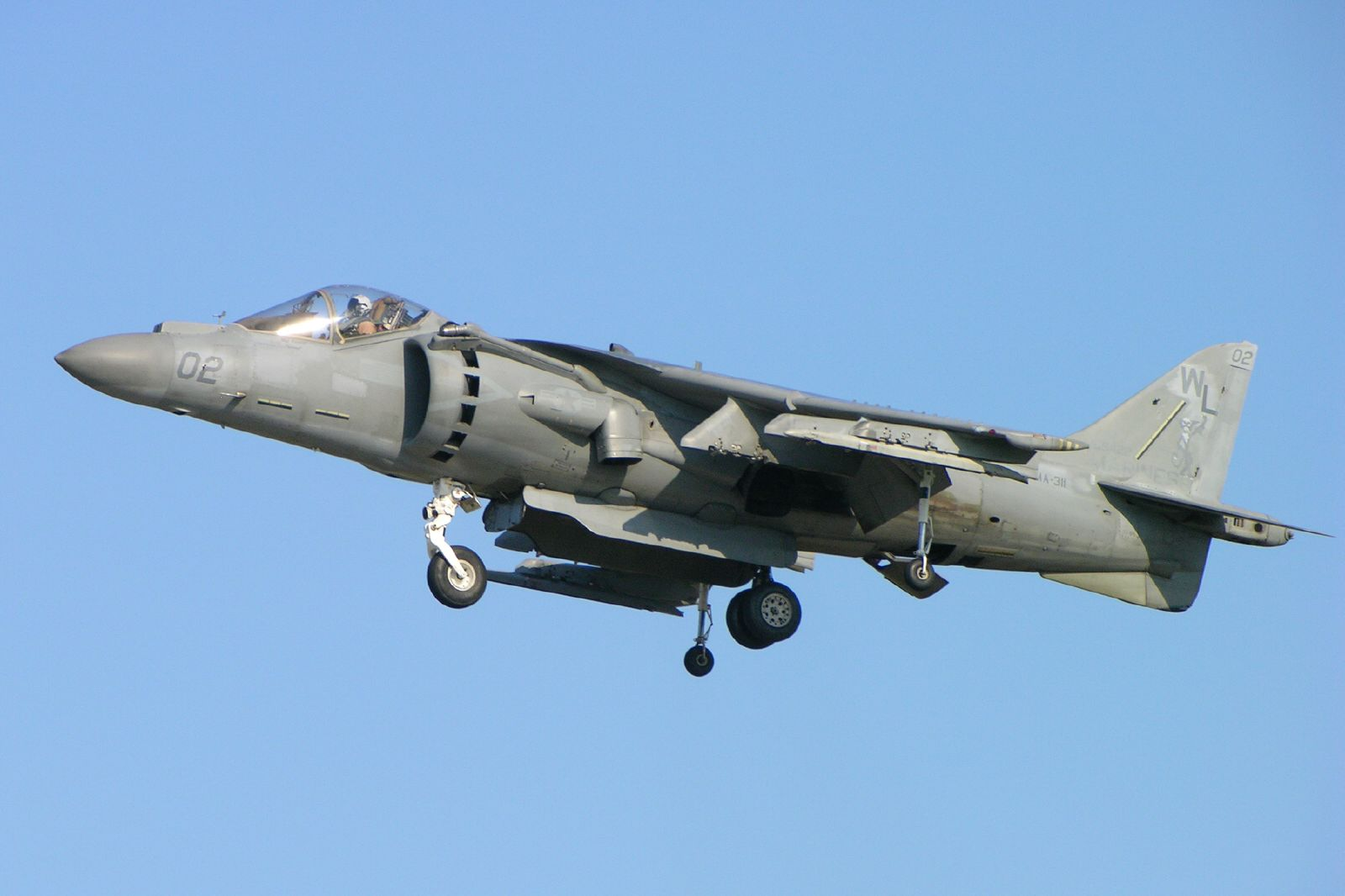
An AV-8 Harrier II jump jet, alleged to be owed to the plaintiff.

The Harrier Jet is not yet visible, but the observer senses the presence of a mighty plane as the extreme winds generated by its flight create a paper maelstrom in a classroom devoted to an otherwise dull physics lesson. Finally, the Harrier Jet swings into view and lands by the side of the school building, bombing everything in sight next to a bicycle rack. Several students run for cover, and the velocity of the wind strips one hapless faculty member down to his underwear. While the faculty member is being deprived of his dignity, the voiceover announces: "Now the more Pepsi you drink, the more great stuff you're gonna get."

— Wood's statement of facts, Leonard v. Pepsico, Inc., 88 F. Supp. 2d 116

In the mid-1990s, Pepsi faced competition from Coca-Cola, and sought to attract a younger audience. In March 1996, Pepsi began the Pepsi Stuff promotional campaign, allowing customers to accrue Pepsi Points that could, in turn, be redeemed for items such as T-shirts and leather jackets. These points could be earned through purchasing Pepsi products, with labels attached to the boxes of such products. The campaign was the largest in Pepsi's history. To advertise the promotion, Pepsi released a series of television commercials; one of these commercials showcased a computer-generated Pepsi-branded AV-8 Harrier II, a Harrier jet manufactured by McDonnell Douglas. The commercial, which offered the jet for 7,000,000 Pepsi Points, caught the attention of John Leonard, a 21-year-old business student. In place of a label, the promotion allowed Pepsi Points to be directly purchased for 10¢ per point, a detail noticed by Leonard, who convinced five investors to lend him a total of $700,000. Leonard sent a check for $700,008.50 (including $10 for shipping and handling), and 15 labels, per promotion rules. The offer was refused by Pepsi, who referred to the promotion of the Harrier jet in the commercial as "fanciful" and stated its intention was to create a "humorous and entertaining ad".

== Procedural history ==
The claim alleged both breach of contract and fraud. The case was originally brought in Florida, but eventually heard in New York. The defendant, PepsiCo, moved for summary judgment pursuant to Federal Rule of Civil Procedure 56. Among other claims made, Leonard claimed that a federal judge was incapable of deciding on the matter, and that instead the decision had to be made by a jury consisting of, among others, members of the "Pepsi Generation" to whom the advertisement would allegedly constitute an offer.

== Judgment ==
The court, presided over by Judge Kimba Wood, rejected Leonard's claims and denied recovery on several grounds, including:

1. It was found that the advertisement featuring the jet did not constitute an offer under the Restatement (Second) of Contracts.
2. The court found that no reasonable person could have believed that the company seriously intended to convey a jet worth roughly $37.4 million for $700,000, i.e., that it was mere puffery.
3. The value of the alleged contract meant that it fell under the provisions of the Statute of Frauds, but the statute's requirement for a written agreement between the parties was not fulfilled, so a contract had not been formed.

In justifying its conclusion that the commercial was "evidently done in jest" and that "The notion of traveling to school in a Harrier Jet is an exaggerated adolescent fantasy," the court made several observations regarding the nature and content of the commercial, including:

- "The callow youth featured in the commercial is a highly improbable pilot, one who could barely be trusted with the keys to his parents' car, much less the prized aircraft of the United States Marine Corps."
- "The teenager's comment that flying a Harrier Jet to school 'sure beats the bus' evinces an improbably insouciant attitude toward the relative difficulty and danger of piloting a fighter plane in a residential area."
- "No school would provide landing space for a student's fighter jet, or condone the disruption the jet's use would cause."

The court also stated that:

In light of the Harrier Jet's well-documented function in attacking and destroying surface and air targets, armed reconnaissance and air interdiction, and offensive and defensive anti-aircraft warfare, depiction of such a jet as a way to get to school in the morning is clearly not serious even if, as plaintiff contends, the jet is capable of being acquired 'in a form that eliminates [its] potential for military use.'

The decision was appealed to the United States Court of Appeals for the Second Circuit, which issued a brief, per curiam opinion concluding, "We affirm for substantially the reasons stated in Judge Wood's opinion."

== Aftermath ==
Pepsi never cashed the check, so there was no case for fraud. Pepsi continued to air the commercial, but it updated the cost of the Harrier Jet to 700 million Pepsi Points and added a clarifying "Just Kidding" disclaimer. The Pentagon stated that the Harrier Jet would not be sold to civilians without "demilitarization".

On November 17, 2022, a docuseries about the case titled Pepsi, Where's My Jet? was released on Netflix.
