= EDiets.com =

American online dietary service

eDiets.com, Inc.
- Type: Public
- Traded as: OTCQB: ASTV
- Industry: Diet/Fitness/Health
- Founded: Florida, USA (1997)
- Headquarters: Clearwater, FL, USA
- Key people: Bob DeCecco, CEO
- Number of employees: N/A
- Website: www.ediets.com

eDiets.com, Inc. is an online service offering professional dietary, nutritional, and exercise advice. The company was formed in 1997. Originally called Practi-cal, the original 12-week weight management program was based on Weighting For Wellness, written by Donna DeCunzo, RD, LD. The program incorporated nutrition, fitness, behavior modification and stress management as part of its tenets. Steve Johnson programmed the database and Dave Humble wrote the business plan.

== Business performance ==
As of June 30, 2006, eDiets.com had over 2 million consumers worldwide and has received the Forbes Spring 2004 and 2005 "Best of the Web" award in the diet and nutrition category, and PC Magazine "Editors' Choice" in May 2004 and 2005.

In 2006, a 45% stake in eDiets was purchased by Prides Capital, a special investment firm that invests in companies poised for rapid growth. eDiets also announced the launch of a meal delivery service called Deliciously Yours making it the only diet company offering delivery of fresh cooked meals. The service has been fully rolled out throughout late 2007 and 2008.

After agreeing a deal with Tesco of the UK, eDiets now trades as Tesco Diets in the UK.

As of February 28, 2013, eDiets became a wholly owned subsidiary of As Seen On TV, Inc. (ASTV)

== Services ==
eDiets bases customer programs on a large diet and food information database which allows customers to personalize diet plans to their own preferences. Meal plans are determined based on three dietary guidelines – clinical, goal and preference. Clinical guidelines are sourced directly from major health organizations or institutes for specific health conditions or considerations. Goals include losing weight or eating sustainably. Preferences include gluten-free, vegan, etc.
