= Pepsi Stuff =

Global loyalty program launched by PepsiCo

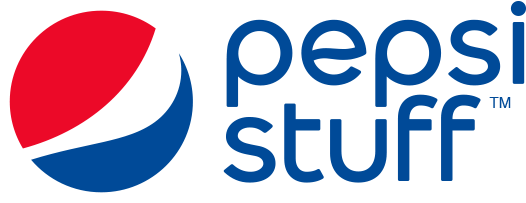
- Website type: Customer loyalty
- Available in: 1 language
- Dissolved: October 31, 1996; 30 years ago (First Version) December 31, 2008; 17 years ago (Second Version) February 28, 2019; 7 years ago (Third Version)
- Predecessor: Pepsi Pass (Third Version)
- Successor: Pepsi Pass (Second Version)
- Creator: PepsiCo
- Website: Archived 28 August 2018 at the Wayback Machine
- Commercial: Yes
- Registration: Optional
- Launched: March 28, 1996 (First Version) February 1, 2008 (Second Version) January 22, 2018 (Third Version)
- Current status: Inactive

Pepsi Stuff was a major loyalty program launched by PepsiCo, first in North America on March 28, 1996 and then around the world, featuring premiums — such as T-shirts, hats, denim and leather jackets, bags, and mountain bikes — that could be purchased with Pepsi Points through the Pepsi Stuff Catalog or online. Customers could acquire points from specially marked Pepsi packages and fountain cups. Additional points were sold both by Pepsi and by consumers, the latter mainly enabled by eBay. The first Pepsi Stuff promotion ended on October 31, 1996. It was relaunched 12 years later on February 1, 2008, ended on December 31, 2008, and was relaunched as Pepsi Pass in August 2015. Pepsi Stuff was relaunched on January 22, 2018 with retro editions of Pepsi, and ended on February 28, 2019.

== History ==
=== Program inception ===
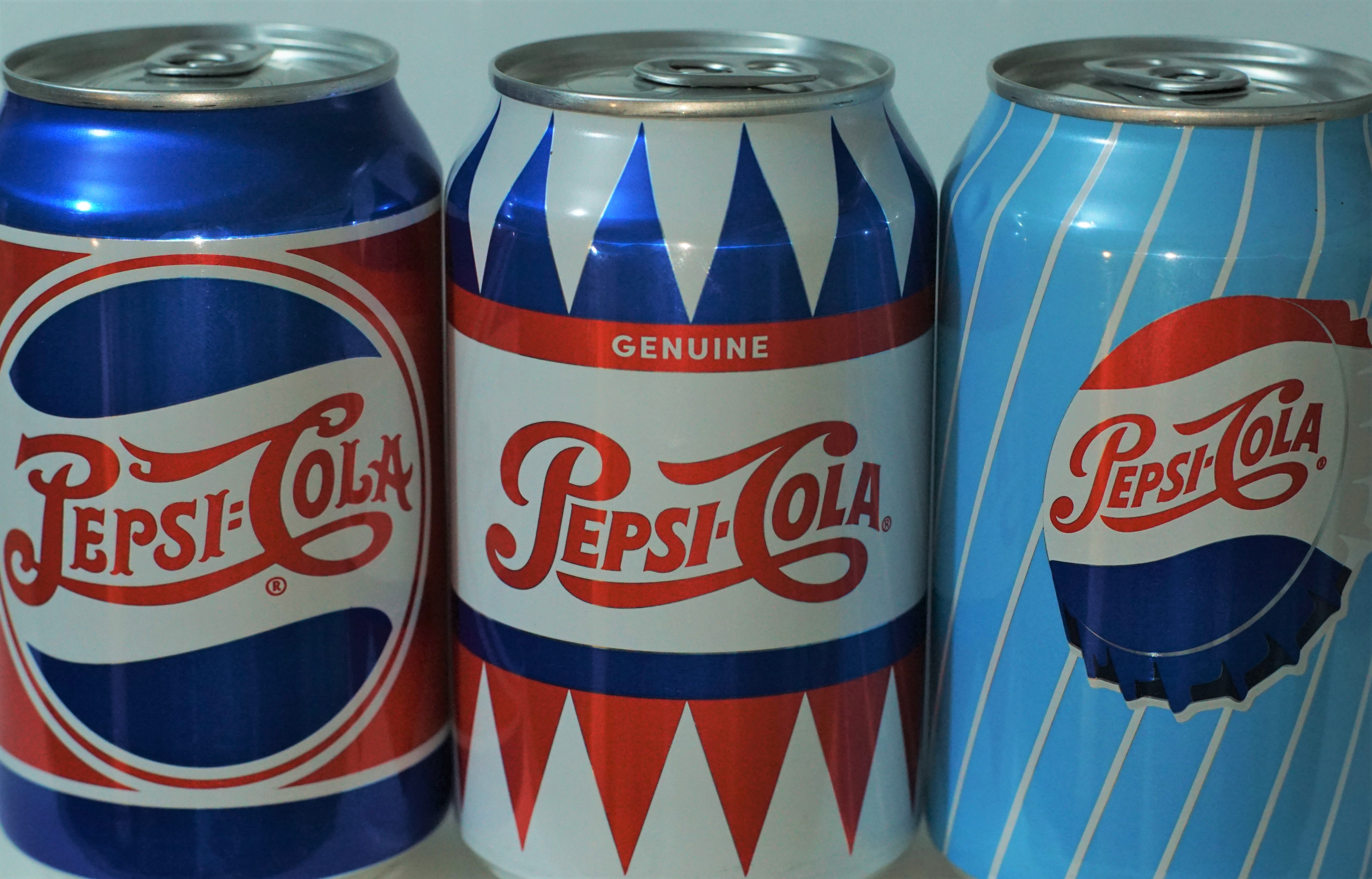
1940s, '50s and '60s versions of the cans

The premium-based loyalty program of PepsiCo called Pepsi Stuff was launched in the United States on March 28, 1996. Points were distributed on four billion packages and billions of cups and millions of consumers participated. According to some sources, the first Pepsi Stuff campaign significantly outperformed The Coca-Cola Company's much-anticipated Atlanta Olympics Summer with growth three times larger than Coca-Cola's and two points of share gained by Pepsi. The Pepsi Stuff campaign ran throughout North America and was expanded to include Mountain Dew and other drinks, and into many international markets. It ended on October 31, 1996. In response to the campaign, The Coca-Cola Company accelerated and extended its discount pricing programs.

=== Partnership with Yahoo! ===
A five-month promotion was launched August 1, 2000 by PepsiCo and Yahoo!. Yahoo! powered the web presence of the Pepsi Points premium program, and a new logo was placed on Pepsi products with the line "Pepsi Stuff.com, Powered by Yahoo!" Pepsi Stuff was one of the first major consumer promotions to feature a dedicated interactive Web site. Celebrities like Andre Agassi, David Beckham, Beyoncé, Cindy Crawford, Jimmy Fallon, Jeff Gordon, Derek Jeter, John Lee Hooker, Shaquille O'Neal, Deion Sanders, Shakira, Britney Spears, and the Spice Girls appeared in TV, print, and Internet advertising promoting Pepsi Stuff. PepsiCo produced over 200 million catalogs each year, billions of Pepsi points, and an extensive line of free merchandise.

=== Lawsuit ===
PepsiCo advertised Pepsi Stuff in a Super Bowl ad in 1996. In that ad, Pepsi advertised a Harrier jump jet as a prize that can be redeemed for 7,000,000 points. John Leonard realized that if he obtained 15 points, and bought the rest of the points, the jet would be cheaper than what it would cost to buy. So Leonard mailed it to Pepsi but the company refused to give him a Harrier jet. A lawsuit was filed in an attempt by a party to obtain a jet for 7 million purchased points. The suit, Leonard v. Pepsico, Inc., 88 F. Supp 2d 116 (S.D.N.Y. 1996) was dismissed and he did not get the jet.

=== Other Pepsi campaigns ===
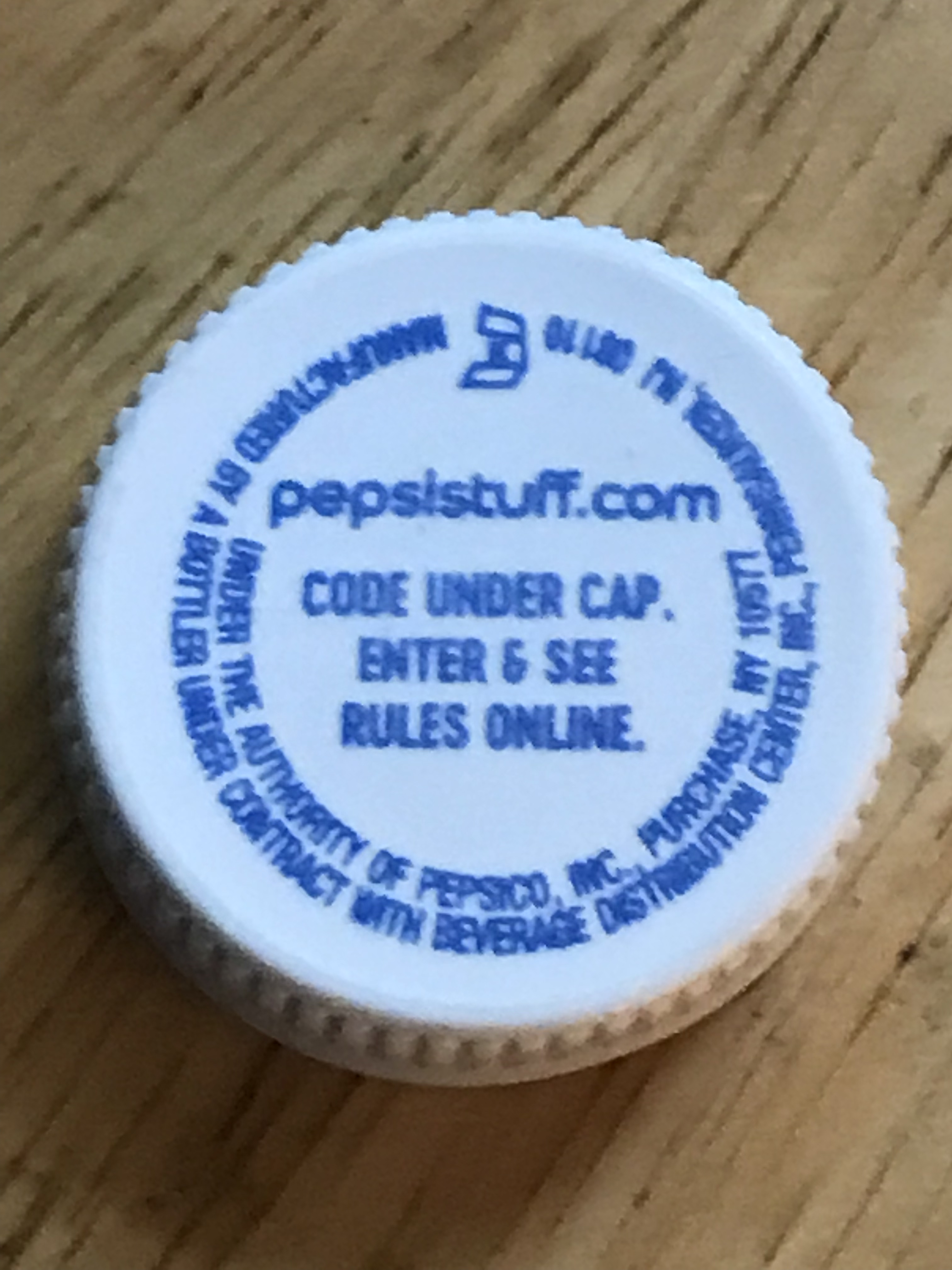
For the bottles Pepsi would provide a code under the bottle cap while for cans the code was printed on the inside of the packaging box in which it was shipped

In the years after the initial Pepsi Stuff promotion, both Pepsi and Coca-Cola have introduced other promotions in a similar vein to the original campaign. Some promotions involved a variety of merchandise, while others involved specific products, such as Cash or MP3s. Pepsi's 2002–2003 iTunes campaign fizzled when only 500 cap codes were redeemed. Also in 2006, Pepsi introduced Pepsi Access in Canada to compete with iCoke, although that campaign ended in 2007.

=== The competition ===
In 2005, The Coca-Cola Company launched iCoke, a very similar program to Pepsi Stuff in which consumers collect points printed on packages in Canada. On February 28, 2006—nearly ten years after the first Pepsi Stuff promotion began—The Coca-Cola Company responded with the launch of its first U.S. loyalty program and biggest promotion ever, My Coke Rewards, a premium program that is managed through four-billion unique codes that consumers can enter online to redeem over $50 million worth of premiums.

=== Rebooting Pepsi Stuff ===
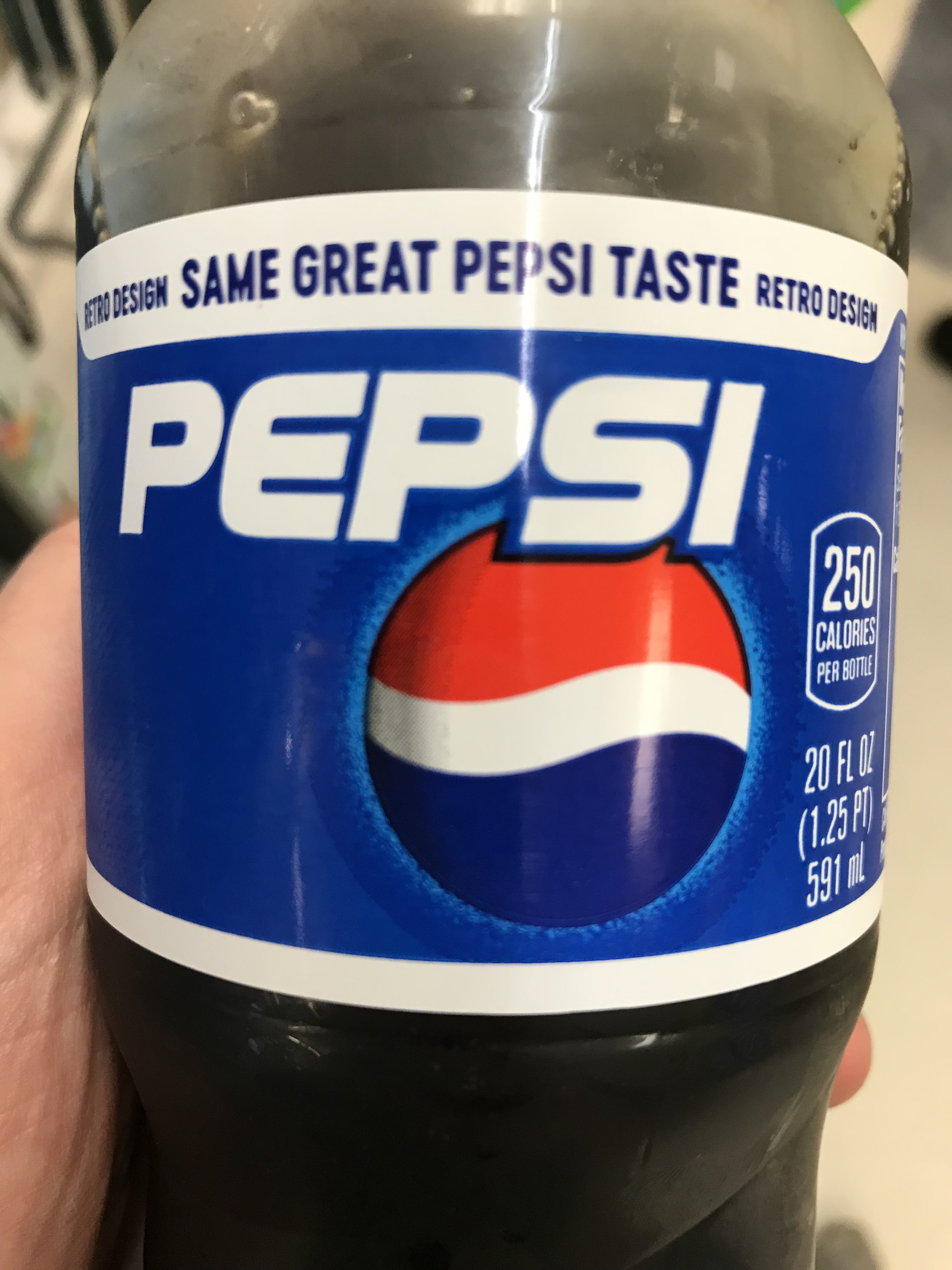
Pepsi re-released the 1998–2008 logo for the 2018 promotion. The 2018 cans and bottles have Britney Spears insignia

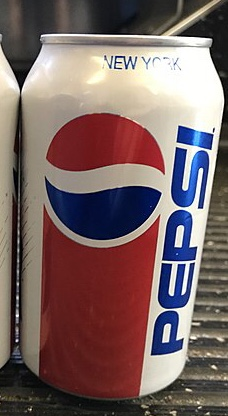
During the 2018 promotion, Pepsi re-released several logos with famous musicians who were featured in their prior ad campaigns, including Ray Charles on a 1990s-style can similar to this one

On February 1, 2008, Pepsi relaunched the program, this time in partnership with Amazon MP3 and with a dedicated website that provides a "shopping" experience modeled on the Amazon website. Amazon's partnership extended to Amazon's website, where the option to pay for certain designated items with Pepsi Points instead of traditional payment methods was available. Pepsi again relied on celebrities to advertise the promotion, including a Super Bowl spot starring Justin Timberlake and featuring Andy Samberg from Saturday Night Live. The promotion ended on December 31, 2008.

=== Relaunch as Pepsi Pass ===
The program relaunched in 2015 as Pepsi Pass, with different ways consumers could earn points: Either through the program's app downloaded through iTunes or Google Play (for 500 points), finding codes under caps (for 1,000 points), or entering the code from the Pepsi website (for 100 points). The prizes were gift cards, electronics, and other items.

=== Relaunch under Pepsi Stuff name ===
The program relaunched on January 22, 2018, reused the old Pepsi Stuff name, and ended on February 28, 2019. Like all programs using the name, points could be earned by finding codes on caps and packaging. But this time, the program partnered with the NFL to add NFL merchandise as part of the possible prizes users could get, in addition to premiums and drawings for concert tickets. Users could also download retro posters with their points as well.

== Point values ==
Products had codes worth different point values; single bottles generally had one point while can 12-packs had two and 24-packs had four. Codes from Pepsi NFL Kickoff 12-packs were worth four points. Items available for redemption through the promotion ranged in value from 5 points (MP3 song download) to 175 points (Vintage Pepsi logo hoodie sweatshirt). Customers could also redeem points for entry in various sweepstakes.

In February 2010, Pepsi launched a similar rewards system in New Zealand on 1.5 litre bottles. Codes on the inside of the labels allowed consumers to purchase MP3s on Bandit.fm. It still is around today and 20 ounce bottles are worth one point along with the taller 16 ounce cans individually.

== See also ==
- My Coke Rewards — now-defunct direct competitor of Pepsi Stuff and Pepsi Pass.
- Pepsi-Cola
- Pepsi Refresh Project
- Premium (marketing)
- Promotion (marketing)
- Leonard v. Pepsico, Inc., a court case involving a Harrier jump jet Pepsi featured in a Pepsi Stuff television commercial.
