= Pop Fiction (TV series) =

American television series

- Opening title card
- Genre: Improv; Comedy
- Starring: Peter Katona
- Country of origin: United States
- Original language: English
- No. of seasons: 1
- No. of episodes: 8 (5 unaired)

Production
- Executive producers: Ashton Kutcher; Jason Goldberg
- Running time: 30 minutes
- Production company: Katalyst Films

Original release
- Network: E!
- Release: March 9 – April 6, 2008

Pop Fiction is an American practical joke television series that debuted on March 9, 2008 on E!. The series is hosted by Peter Katona, and in the spirit of Punk'd, the show creates fake gossip for the paparazzi.

== Tagline ==
Is it real, or is it Pop Fiction? Celebrities who try to trick the reporters say the tagline "Is it real, or is it Pop Fiction?" at the end of the clips, similar to Punk'd, where celebrities say "I just got punk'd!"

== Episodes ==
No.	Title	Original release date
1	"Paris Hilton/Avril Lavigne"	March 9, 2008
Paris Hilton and a guru drove around Los Angeles, eating, shopping, and eventually going into a hotel. Avril Lavigne puts on a fake baby bump, and went shopping for baby clothes in Baby Kitson in Beverly Hills with her husband, Deryck Whibley and some other close family friends.
2	"Eva Longoria/David Spade"	March 16, 2008
Eva Longoria and Mario Lopez had a lunch date together in Café Med. David Spade helps a bachelorette party to get into a hip club, Club Villa, and then he leaves with the bride-to-be on the eve of her wedding.
3	"Audrina Patridge/Lisa Rinna"	April 6, 2008
Audrina Patridge (From the MTV Show The Hills) gets a tattoo with the words "pork fried rice" in Chinese. But while Audrina is getting the tattoo, another star shows up right next to the place she is getting the tattoo.Lisa Rinna has an affair with a younger man on a Malibu beach hotel. Then the next night the paparazzi tell her husband, Harry Hamlin about the affair.
