= List of Punk'd episodes =

The following is a complete episode list for the TV series Punk'd. Bold victims appeared on Punk'd more than once. The show began in 2003 but ended in 2007. The show resumed production after an extended hiatus for a ninth season in 2012.

Punk'd returned in 2020 on the new mobile streaming app Quibi, with Chance the Rapper as the new host. It debuted with 3 episodes for everybody and with an additional 3 episodes lead, if the user's email was entered on Quibi's website prior to launch.

== Series overview ==
Season	Episodes	Originally aired		Network
Season	Episodes	First aired	Last aired	Network
1	8	March 17, 2003	May 5, 2003	MTV
2	8	October 26, 2003	December 14, 2003	MTV
3	8	April 25, 2004	June 13, 2004	MTV
4	8	March 6, 2005	April 24, 2005	MTV
5	8	June 26, 2005	August 14, 2005	MTV
6	8	October 30, 2005	December 18, 2005	MTV
7	8	April 3, 2006	May 22, 2006	MTV
8	8	April 7, 2007	May 29, 2007	MTV
9	12	March 29, 2012	June 7, 2012	MTV
10	8	August 18, 2015	December 8, 2015	BET
11	10	April 6, 2020	April 10, 2020	Quibi

== Episodes ==
=== Season 1 (2003) ===
No. in series	No. in season	Original air date
1	1	March 17, 2003
Frankie Muniz entrusts his $250,000 Porsche Speedster to a valet so that he can meet with Ashton about a proposed movie project. The valet takes the car for a spin around the block a few times, while Dax Shepard poses as the thief who stole Muniz's car and speaks to Muniz on the phone. Meanwhile, Frankie believes his beautiful car was just stolen. Justin Timberlake is led to believe he owes $900,000 in back taxes when government agents appear to confiscate his house and valuables, (Mike Drake is the top FBI agent involved) including his dog, bringing him to tears. The prank was named by Time magazine as No. 3 in their list of 32 Epic Moments in Reality-TV History. Timberlake would later help punk Kelly Osbourne in this season's fourth episode, and would later parody Ashton Kutcher when he hosted Saturday Night Live.
2	2	March 24, 2003
Eliza Dushku is out shopping with friends and they leave her alone but when she tries to leave they find over $500 of clothes and accuse her of trying to steal it. Mandy Moore thinks she's on a new MTV show, and after touring a trailer home, a huge sign crushes it, for which Mandy is blamed.
3	3	March 31, 2003
Browsing a clothing store, Jessica Alba is tormented by a shopper who walks around in the nude while trying on clothes, even attempting to use the same mirror as her. Wilmer Valderrama's SUV gets destroyed by a jealous boyfriend in a love triangle thinking the car belonged to Ashton. Valderrama is left speechless.
4	4	April 7, 2003
Kelly Osbourne is Punk'd by Justin Timberlake: she is given an advice on how to improve her image.
5	5	April 14, 2003
Kevin Richardson is stopped by the MTV security and tells him he cannot go through because the security keeps going off. Trishelle Cannatella is Punk'd the same way as Kevin Richardson. Wilmer Valderrama pranks Seth Green by setting him up for the blame when their craps game is raided by the authorities.
6	6	April 21, 2003
Jessica Biel is at a restaurant and a fan asks her if she'll watch his son, but after she agrees and he starts asking her rude questions. His father accuses her of saying rude things to his son and wants to press charges on her. Nick Lachey is Punk'd by his own then-wife, singer-actress Jessica Simpson, and her mother Tina lead him to believe that a group of people who have shown up to ask for money are their long-lost relatives.
7	7	April 28, 2003
Stephen Dorff is set up to get stuck with an $8,000 bar tab. Pink thinks she is being framed by her boyfriend for running a motorcycle "chop shop". Jack Osbourne and Wee-Man are stopped by MTV security and denied access through the metal detector Segment.
8	8	May 5, 2003
Rosario Dawson is taken for a ride when she is duped into thinking her limo hit a pedestrian. Jason Goldberg is pranked by Britney Spears, who teamed up with Kutcher. Originally, Britney Spears was going to punk Busta Rhymes, and Ashton had an agreement with her that he could not punk her. When they realized they couldn't punk Busta, Britney and the Punk'd crew decide to punk Ashton. Ashton lets Britney know he knows what's going on, and they turn the tables on the Punk'd crew. The Punk'd crew is rude to NFL players, Jerome Bettis, Jeff Garcia and Rod Smith, during a golf tournament. Featuring Jerome Bettis, Jeff Garcia, Rod Smith, Dax Shepard and Punk'd co-creator Jeff Goldberg.

=== Season 2 (2003) ===
No. in series	No. in season	Original air date
9	1	October 26, 2003
Hilary Duff goes for some routine driving lessons. Her driving teacher, however, wants to teach Hilary some very unorthodox driving strategies, resulting in a carjacking that is blamed on poor Duff. Missy Elliott goes to a jewelry store to get some of her necklaces cleaned, but a delivery person has accidentally walked off with the wrong package. The punk ends when Missy issues a harsh ultimatum to get the jewelry back in five seconds lest she become unpleasant. Usher is notified that his little brother is in trouble at a store for shoplifting.
10	2	November 2, 2003
Bow Wow is at a photo shoot and finds out he'll be photographed with a tiger. After he sets down some jewelry he has to wear for the shoot, it turns up missing. They tell him he must replace them with his own money. Bow Wow reappeared in Season 2, Episode 4 to set up his best friend Omarion. Nick Carter thinks he is pranking Tommy Lee. However, when they try to practice, Carter accidentally hits a crew member with his van, for which Carter is blamed. Later, Carter helps to pull the same prank on Tommy Lee.
11	3	November 9, 2003
Katie Holmes finds herself caught between the girlfriend and the lover of a potential film producer. When the girlfriend asks her who he was with, she says she does not know and tries to keep out of it by saying nothing, but that does not work. Eventually the girlfriend thinks she is with him also. Tracy Morgan's car is confiscated by a tow truck whose driver indicates it must be driven to Barstow, California. Morgan refuses to let him, so the truck driver tries to bribe him with his wheels. Mýa finds herself stuck with a guy, who won a date with her in a contest and is in love with her.
12	4	November 16, 2003
Ashanti is Punk'd by Ashton Kutcher along with other people at Los Angeles International Airport. Lara Flynn Boyle and Omarion appear, as well, in this episode. Omarion would later appear again on Season 4 Episode 5 to trick his mentor/friend Marques Houston.
13	5	November 23, 2003
Halle Berry, Rachael Leigh Cook, and Taye Diggs
14	6	November 30, 2003
Travis Barker goes on a date with his girlfriend, Shanna Moakler. Moakler's ex-boyfriend shows up, and Shanna ends up telling Travis what a great boyfriend he was. Jaime Pressly is starting her own clothing line and is met at one of her factories by FBI agents, telling her the factory has had children working at it for under minimum wage.
15	7	December 7, 2003
Dave Mirra is accused of fraud by the IRS. OutKast is told they must pay the bill for a totaled rental car. Amber Tamblyn is asked to watch a dog while she waits for her fiancée but after another person appears indicating that he is the owner and leaves with the dog, the "owner" returns and blames Tamblyn for losing her dog, which is indicated to be a prize show dog.
16	8	December 14, 2003
Beyoncé Knowles visits a group of children for Christmas. After attempting to crown a several story-high Christmas tree with a star, Knowles is led to believe that she caused it to fall over, destroying the presents at its base. Bill Goldberg is led to believe his motorcycle just got run over by a truck but the driver misses the bike, and it blows up without being touched. Kutcher is forced to abort the failed prank. Lindsay Lohan and her assistant are riding in a limousine whose driver's wife is having a baby, and when he stops at a gas station some people tell them they have to take the automobile. He returns and tells them the limo just got stolen. He misses his child being born and blames Lohan.

=== Season 3 (2004) ===
No. in series	No. in season	Original air date
17	1	April 25, 2004
Adam Brody is approached at a restaurant and hit on by woman, who has recently become engaged, resulting in best man and fiancée causing scene and arguing with Adam in middle of restaurant. Eve is in the middle of a fake job interview when assistant knocks over table and blames it on Eve. Resulting in the boss firing the assistant. While shopping for a new Porsche in a warehouse, police break in and seize the illegal operation. Matthew Perry becomes questioned and almost arrested by police officers for not cooperating.
18	2	May 2, 2004
Chris Klein, then Jeremy Sisto, and finally Tisha Campbell-Martin and Vivica A. Fox.
19	3	May 9, 2004
Kaley Cuoco's car at a restaurant had been blocked off by motor home. When motor home is towed away extensive damage occurs resulting in the owners of motor home questioning Kaley in why she had done this. The Rock is blamed for leaving electricity on in a caravan resulting in it exploding and fire department to come put it out. Julia Stiles is asked to try on artifact clothing for new movie, resulting in the sleeve being torn off.
20	4	May 16, 2004
Jennifer Love Hewitt is called into a film studio and offered a role in an upcoming movie. Her meeting goes wrong when violent bookies appear and demand money from the producer. Warren Sapp and Evan Rachel Wood also appear.
21	5	May 23, 2004
Tara Reid is involved in a hit and run when the driver hits a woman and drives away. Carmen Electra and Dave Navarro think they're meeting Kutcher about a new show, but on their way there, they are involved in a hit and run.
22	6	May 30, 2004
Brandy and her brother are driving when the police stop them and accuse them of carrying stolen jewelry, a bag of which they find after searching the car. Brandy breaks into tears when they arrest her brother. Mekhi Phifer gets accused of not paying his tax and tell him he must pay it or he could go to jail. Mike Shinoda finds himself being accused for parking next to a fire hydrant when there was a fire and they had to break his windows to get the hose through. He is told he has to pay a fine.
23	7	June 6, 2004
Carmelo Anthony gets accused of inappropriate contact with an underage girl. Shannon Elizabeth learns of an unauthorized honeymoon video tape. She is advised to release it, but Elizabeth is infuriated at the invasion of her privacy, and intends to sue the hotel. Jena Malone rents a car but after driving a few blocks her friend finds a huge amount of cash in the car and when they return she's accused of trying to steal it.
24	8	June 13, 2004
Tyra Banks is Punk'd by Tasha Smith. Tyra Banks' mom takes her out to dinner at a restaurant, with a sign posted outside saying there is filming going on inside. It's a girl gone wild, when Tyra Banks gets caught on tape. Good Charlotte singer Joel Madden's Range Rover gets put on a tow truck because of car troubles, then swapped with an identical dummy. He, his twin brother Benji, and bandmate take a cab home, during which Joel spots his precious car dropped on top of another car along the way. Joel Madden reappeared in Season 7, Episode 6 to prank Michelle Trachtenberg. Kanye West is shooting a music video for his single "Jesus Walks". He is greeted by the Los Angeles Film Commission, who is outraged by the idea of shooting a film about Jesus on a Sunday. The production is shut down and the material confiscated.

=== Season 4 (2005) ===
No. in series	No. in season	Original air date	Celebrity/Victim	Notes
25	1	March 6, 2005	Salma Hayek	Penélope Cruz helps punk her friend Salma Hayek, who is accused of making a large fecal mess in a women's bathroom, causing a toilet to overflow.
25	1	March 6, 2005	Eva Longoria	Eva Longoria and co-star Jesse Metcalfe are leaving the set of Desperate Housewives, when they get pulled over by the police. Metcalfe flees the scene, leaving the police to discover a false identity and a large amount of cash, implicating Longoria.
25	1	March 6, 2005	Mario	18-year-old Mario thinks he's going to meet a friend in a hotel room, but instead opens the door to a half-naked elderly woman. The hotel manager tries to get to the bottom of the situation and ends up making Mario upset.
26	2	March 13, 2005	Kirsten Dunst	While having dinner at a restaurant, Kirsten Dunst and her two friends are given fake drinks. Later they are stopped at a sobriety checkpoint, where Kirsten's friend hits the front end of a police squad car.
26	2	March 13, 2005	Jesse Metcalfe	Jesse Metcalfe, previously the accomplice of Eva Longoria in the Season 4 premiere is now asked to audition for a supervillain role in a fictitious Spider-Man film. Jesse puts on tights and recites lines for the audition. He follows the casting director's advice for his movements, but this displeases the technician. The equipment breaks and it looks like Jesse is blamed for it.
26	2	March 13, 2005	Michelle Rodriguez	Michelle Rodriguez and her friend Giancarlo go to a convenient store. While there, they start horseplaying. When Michelle Rodriguez pushes her friend into one of the shelves, they all topple over, leaving one man trapped underneath. They lift the shelves, exposing a mess of broken bottles, spilled liquids and an injured man.
27	3	March 20, 2005	Zach Braff	Zach Braff's Scrubs co-star Donald Faison feels that Braff is so protective of his Porsche that he helps punk him. After Braff refuses a group of children's request to buy them beer at a liquor store, they spray paint Braff's car with graffiti, but the children deny it.
27	3	March 20, 2005	Zoe Saldaña	Saldaña discovers Chris and Julia in a romantic embrace, despite the fact that Chris is dating Saldaña's friend Kellee. Despite Saldaña's relating this information to Kellee, Kellee is reluctant to break up with Chris, because she feels he is "the one" for her, much to Saldaña's outrage.
27	3	March 20, 2005	Serena Williams	Serena Williams and her friend stop at a supermarket, and park next to a woman who is having difficulty with her willfully disobedient nephew Rob. When the woman goes into the store and asks Serena to look after the boy, he drives off with the car, leading to a chase by Serena, her friend and the woman. Williams appeared again in Season 6, Episode 6.
28	4	March 27, 2005	Rachel Bilson	Rachel Bilson and her dog are being blamed for the tipping of a mail delivery truck and the breaking of a water main.
28	4	March 27, 2005	Jadakiss	Jadakiss is a passenger in a car that is suddenly stuck in traffic. After motorists yell at him to move the car, he abandons the car and hops in a taxi, driven by Field Agent Chris. When he goes the wrong way, Jadakiss hops out and starts heading down the street on foot.
28	4	March 27, 2005	Dirk Nowitzki	Rob Pinkston plays a fan who asks Dirk Nowitzki, who is eating dinner at a restaurant, to sign a shirt, which he gladly does. But the young fan then requests he sign a large collection of other memorabilia, which Nowitzki does, despite his friends' insistence that he decline. When the fan returns with a second bag filled with memorabilia, Nowitzki declines, but is later told by the Maitre D that he and his party are no longer welcome there.
29	5	April 3, 2005	Marques Houston	Omarion sets up Marques Huston. Omarion brings his girlfriend to meet Marques, but also to break up with her. She reveals to Marques that she's pregnant. Omarion insists that there's no baby and she's making it up. After a while, her ex-boyfriend shows up and he looks angry. He wants to know whose baby it is. He insists that heads are gonna roll, but Marques keeps it pretty cool. Finally the Punk'd crew shows up to slow the roll.
29	5	April 3, 2005	Andy Roddick	Andy Roddick has to get to The Tonight Show with Jay Leno and the driver, Chris, decides to take a shortcut. They hit a roadblock that is set up because of the 2005 Los Angeles mudslides, but cannot go back, and the car is stuck. When the police arrive, an argument breaks out and suddenly Andy is blamed for the matter. The police make him sit there in this no-pass zone, intending to keep him there until 4pm.
29	5	April 3, 2005	Jamie-Lynn Sigler	When Sigler and her husband are given the check after dining at a restaurant, the waitress, Dana, asks for a tip to cover the expense of things accidentally left out of the check, and is fired by her manager, Chris, when he hears about this "tip-begging". Feeling guilty over the woman's need to support her children, Sigler asks that the manager reconsider.
30	6	April 10, 2005	Chingy	Chingy is questioned by police after two of his bodyguards are accused of beating up a fan who approached Chingy as he dined in a restaurant to ask about making a record deal.
30	6	April 10, 2005	Jon Heder	Jon Heder learns that a restaurant he has gone to under the coaxing of his twin brother is actually a high-end brothel when the Los Angeles Police Department Vice Squad raids the establishment.
30	6	April 10, 2005	Joss Stone	Joss Stone is going to a clothing store, and young Rob Pinkston walks in, nervous because he can't find his mom. Joss is asked by the boy's mom to keep after him until she arrives. Rob is troubled and quite mad, as he starts breaking things in the store. He storms out and runs away, but when his mother arrives, everything is blamed on Joss.
31	7	April 17, 2005	Vanessa Carlton	Vanessa Carlton is preparing for a visit on The Tonight Show with Jay Leno, but is assisted by an incompetent back-up band that is really trying her patience.
31	7	April 17, 2005	Ciara	Ciara is being driven to an event when the driver, Jordan, has an altercation with another driver. They engage in typical road-rage activities, until the other car hits several water barrels and leaps off a dirt embankment. The police arrive and start to question Ciara.
31	7	April 17, 2005	Nicole Richie	Nicole Richie and her fiancée go out to eat. The waiter, Chris, takes a liking to Nicole and later asks for her number while the fiancée is using the restroom. Nicole is patient and very kind and takes his number anyway. When Chris comes back, constantly with his hands on Nicole's arm or shoulder, the fiancée takes great offense and starts an argument with the waiter. When the manager gets involved, Richie is blamed for taking the waiter's number.
32	8	April 25, 2005	"Stone Cold" Steve Austin	Kutcher, curious if Stone Cold Steve Austin really is the defender of "the little guy", leads him to believe that he is responsible for losing someone's job, which occurs when a valet manager, Chris, blames one of his employees for stealing Austin's cell phone. Austin excoriates Chris for his refusal to rehire the valet, even after the phone is located.
32	8	April 25, 2005	Bizarre & Proof of D12	When Bizarre withdraws money from an ATM, it gives him much more than he asks for. He is then confronted by a policeman (Steve), who questions him about the ATM.
32	8	April 25, 2005	Ashlee Simpson	Ashlee Simpson visits an art gallery with her two best friends. While talking and viewing the art, she places a jacket next to a candle. It catches fire and the sprinklers come on, ruining all the art. Ashlee is blamed for it by the deceased artist's brother, bringing her to tears.

=== Season 5 (2005) ===
No. in series	No. in season	Original air date	Celebrity/Victim	Notes
33	1	June 26, 2005	Simon Cowell	Sunday Stew's Royally Stewed Winner. Simon Cowell's $400,000 Rolls-Royce is stolen because he gave the keys to the wrong person.
33	1	June 26, 2005	The Game	The Game thinks he's going to meet a producer about a million dollar movie deal, but during the meeting, the Punk'd crew pours cement at the entrance, trapping The Game in.
33	1	June 26, 2005	Raven	When the Punk'd crew turns a parking spot into a handicapped spot, Raven finds herself being blamed by the elderly.
34	2	July 3, 2005	Allen Iverson	Allen Iverson is having a birthday party but the Secret Service refuses him entry because the President's daughter is about to arrive.
34	2	July 3, 2005	George Lopez	George Lopez is told he has built a part of his house over a sewer main, and that part of the house has to be torn down.
34	2	July 3, 2005	Jermaine O'Neal	Jermaine O'Neal is trying to get in to the same party but he is refused entry because he did not bring any girls.
34	2	July 3, 2005	Tyrese	Tyrese is led to believe that the mob is interested in lending him money to shoot a movie.
35	3	July 10, 2005	Tony Hawk	Tony Hawk arrives on a scene where his son Riley just set off an M-80 in a toilet, injuring a girl.
35	3	July 10, 2005	Jesse McCartney	Jesse McCartney gets blamed for damaging a group of motorcycles with his car, angering a group of bikers. The Punk is called off when McCartney panics and locks himself in his car. The event left him shaking afterward, and he described himself as being "almost in tears". McCartney appeared again in Season 5, Episode 6 by playing the role of Ashton Kutcher.
35	3	July 10, 2005	Brittany Snow	Brittany Snow is led to believe that she has knocked over a portable toilet. She later appears in Season 6 Episode 2, in which she pranks One Tree Hill actress Sophia Bush.
36	4	July 17, 2005	Thora Birch	Thora Birch and her brother hear a baby crying in a locked car. When a parking attendant smashes the window, the owner shows up and it turns out the baby was just a doll, and blames Birch for breaking his window.
36	4	July 17, 2005	T.I.	T.I. gets held up at baggage claim when his bag is searched and bullets are found.
36	4	July 17, 2005	Sofía Vergara	When Sofia Vergara tries to help a man in a wheelchair go down a flight of stairs, he falls down the stairs, and she is accused of pushing him.
37	5	July 24, 2005	Akon	Akon is doing a Japanese commercial and is made to say unflattering things about himself like "I'm gullible" and "I'm being Punk'd".
37	5	July 24, 2005	Jason Bateman	Jason Bateman accidentally hits another car and tries to hide it by parking far away from it, but is confronted by the police, who see the paint from the other car on his.
37	5	July 24, 2005	Benjamin McKenzie	Benjamin McKenzie's car is egged by a teenager. When the teen is caught, his father gets angry and smashes eggs on his head and asks McKenzie to do the same, but McKenzie refuses.
38	6	July 31, 2005	Adrien Brody	Adrien Brody asks a 15-year-old boy to move a car without a license so he could get his car out and the teen ends up smashing into another vehicle.
38	6	July 31, 2005	Mila Kunis	Mila Kunis tries to help a little girl get her dog back because it fell into a gutter. After learning it's a toy dog, Andrew gets his hand stuck in the gutter.
38	6	July 31, 2005	Lisa Leslie	Lisa Leslie gets blamed for asking a man to turn on a lamp, who falls over, knocking the lamp over and hitting another table.
39	7	August 7, 2005	Ryan Cabrera	Ryan Cabrera is blamed for neglecting to set his car's emergency brake, resulting in it rolling down a hill and causing an air conditioner to crush another vehicle.
39	7	August 7, 2005	Ja Rule	Ja Rule's car is covered in sewer water, and is told he can't move the car because it is highly toxic.
39	7	August 7, 2005	Laura Prepon	Laura Prepon's friend treats her to a birthday meal at a restaurant. After finding out it wasn't her birthday, her friend gets fired for giving her a free meal.
40	8	August 14, 2005	Avril Lavigne	After Avril Lavigne parks her car, the Punk'd crew puts a car right behind hers and a reserved sign next to it. When others help Lavigne push the car, it rolls into a transformer and blows up.
40	8	August 14, 2005	Shaquille O'Neal	Shaquille O'Neal takes someone else's parking spot and after he leaves, the Punk'd crew takes the air out of his car.
40	8	August 14, 2005	Triple H	Triple H wrecks a wedding by pushing on a door, hitting the bride in the nose, and leading her father to cancel the wedding.

=== Season 6 (2005) ===
No. in series	No. in season	Original air date	Celebrity/Victim	Notes
41	1	October 30, 2005	Mischa Barton	While Mischa Barton and her friend Cisco dine at a restaurant and as they speak to someone at another table, a bus boy takes their day planner, resulting in his being fired.
41	1	October 30, 2005	Bernie Mac	When a stop light at which Bernie Mac and his driver are stopped doesn't change, Mac eventually tells the driver to run it. The police then stop them and arrest the driver.
41	1	October 30, 2005	Ying Yang Twins	The Ying Yang Twins are at a gate that keeps going up and down, denying them passage. Eventually, another driver gets mad and drives through the gate knocking it down, for which the Twins are blamed.
42	2	November 6, 2005	Sophia Bush	Sophia Bush is at a restaurant with Brittany Snow and another friend. Snow accidentally knocks her drink onto Bush, who backs her chair into a waiter, knocking him into a lobster tank and breaking it.
42	2	November 6, 2005	Daddy Yankee	Daddy Yankee is at a radio station for an interview and when he thinks he's off the air he uses profanity, leading listeners to call in to complain, leading to a $463,000 fine imposed on him.
42	2	November 6, 2005	Kelly Monaco	Kelly Monaco parks in a restricted area, resulting in her vehicle being towed. The crew switches her car, and after telling her she has to pay $456, her car slips off the tow truck and gets smashed.
43	3	November 13, 2005	David Boreanaz	David Boreanaz and his wife Jaime are at a restaurant, and after taking a bite of salad his wife finds a piece of glass, causing bleeding in her mouth.
43	3	November 13, 2005	Kristin Cavallari	Kristin Cavalleri gets her door slammed into by Matt, who starts kicking and spitting on Frankie's car. Frankie then beats Matt's car with a gold club. The police arrive, bringing Kristin to tears.
43	3	November 13, 2005	Terrell Owens	When Terrell Owens lends helps a group of elderly people away from an overturned bus, an attorney tells him he is liable for it.
44	4	November 20, 2005	Kristen Bell	Kristen and her boyfriend find a dog and try to save it, but run into the owner who accuses her of taking it.
44	4	November 20, 2005	Bam Margera	Bam Margera waits in a car while his friend Ryan is in a liquor store that's in the process of being robbed. When Bam investigates, the police arrive.
44	4	November 20, 2005	Amber Valletta	Amber Valletta helps a guy choking by hitting him on the back. Matt performs the Heimlich maneuver. He accuses her of pushing him away. Will asks if anyone wants to press charges and the guy tells her it is a hate crime.
45	5	November 27, 2005	Neve Campbell	Campbell and a friend are at a restaurant when a little boy shows up and says he's lost.
45	5	November 27, 2005	Mike Jones	After Mike Jones' driver walks away, a child riding a stolen bicycle flips over the vehicle and two other kids start beating him before fleeing. Matt keeps telling the cops he did it and they arrest him.
45	5	November 27, 2005	Danny Masterson	When Masterson tries to prevent a child try to take some stereo equipment that fell off a truck, Matt arrives and accuses Masterson of trying to steal.
46	6	December 4, 2005	Ellen Pompeo	Pompeo and her fiancée Chris go to a restaurant where they accidentally give a sizable tip to a friendly waitress, now grateful that she can afford to visit her sister in Florida.
46	6	December 4, 2005	Shaun White	Shaun White is at a photo shoot and during the break he starts flying a remote controlled helicopter, which dives into a conduit box and explodes. He gets blamed for causing the electricity to go out in the whole park.
46	6	December 4, 2005	Venus Williams	Serena Williams helps to punk her sister Venus. They are taking photos with people who were injured in an accident. Will says he's faking it because he just wanted to meet Venus. The guard picks up the wrong guy and Will says he wasn't faking it.
47	7	December 11, 2005	Macy Gray	Macy Gray is told there is black mold in the building that houses her music academy, which leads to a woman's refusal to enroll her son there. After reading the paperwork she finds out it wasn't her address.
47	7	December 11, 2005	Justin Long	Justin goes to a restaurant, where he buys two underage girls drinks, resulting in the firing of a waitress, and the anger of the girl's father.
47	7	December 11, 2005	DJ Qualls	DJ Qualls and Telisha from the Pussycat Dolls ruin a surprise birthday party upon entering a restaurant, when they are showered with balloons and confetti intended for the true guest of honor.
48	8	December 18, 2005	Baby Blue	When Pretty Ricky's Baby Blue returns to his hotel room he finds it damaged, for which he is blamed by the hotel manager.
48	8	December 18, 2005	Sean Paul	Sean Paul runs into a blind woman who lost her seeing eye dog, and when Sean tries to help her, a guy on a scooter runs into her, for which Paul is blamed.
48	8	December 18, 2005	Pete Wentz	Wentz was punk'd by Andy, Patrick, and Joe from Fall Out Boy, who lead him to believe he's going to be giving presents to child kids of Hurricane Katrina but is blamed for the derailment of a train that destroys a Christmas display.

=== Season 7 (2006) ===
No. in series	No. in season	Original air date	Celebrity/Victim	Notes
49	1	April 3, 2006	Rob Thomas	After Rob Thomas' wife is locked inside a cafe bathroom, and good Samaritan tries to pry the door open with a crowbar, an alarm is triggered, leading the police to accuse Thomas of trying to break in.
49	1	April 3, 2006	Ashley Parker Angel	As Ashley Parker Angel's fiancé Tiffany's changes in a bathroom, a guy jumps into their car claiming a gorilla is chasing him. Just then a gorilla shows up and moments later starts heading towards Tiffany. A zoo keeper is trying to calm it and Tiffany down but then the park ranger threatens to shoot it or anyone in the way.
49	1	April 3, 2006	Kate Beckinsale	Kate and her ex-partner Michael Sheen go to a hotel restaurant, where a guy starts hitting on her. Michael ends up pushing someone into a pool.
50	2	April 10, 2006	Doug Robb	Doug and his friend are caught searching through a mailbox looking for his friend's keys. He is then blamed for putting in a mysterious box without a forwarding address.
50	2	April 10, 2006	Ne-Yo	Ne-Yo and his friend come across a bag full of money in an alley, and learn it is ransom money when the police arrive and demand to know where a kidnapped child is.
50	2	April 10, 2006	Stephen Colletti	After Stephen Colletti's girlfriend, Hayden Panettiere, sees two construction workers taking pictures while at a tanning salon, she pushes one of them into a ladder, knocking the other man off, implicating Colletti.
51	3	April 17, 2006	DJ Paul	While DJ Paul has dinner with a producer couple, an urn holding the ashes of the husband's father is accidentally dropped as it's handed to Paul.
51	3	April 17, 2006	Stacy Keibler	Stacy Keibler and her boyfriend Geoff are asked for autographs by fans, but their bus is blocking their exit. A valet hoses the fans and blames it on Stacy.
51	3	April 17, 2006	Elisha Cuthbert	Elisha Cuthbert comes across a baby sitting on top of a car, and when the owner of the car calls the police and is about to take it to a hospital the mother shows up and the police take her baby away.
52	4	April 24, 2006	Chris Brown	Chris Brown takes his mother and manager to a restaurant, and when his mom gets sick from the salad, the waiter accuses him of being rude and tells the manager of the restaurant their table was causing problems.
52	4	April 24, 2006	Sonny Sandoval	Sonny Sandoval is informed that he must be decontaminated and quarantined after passing overturned tanker truck spilling waste materials.
52	4	April 24, 2006	E-40	E-40 tries to help a woman get her dog out of her car but after she leaves the real owner comes by and asks him why he's breaking into his car. The owner tells the police he wants both him and his ex-girlfriend arrested. She tells them that she paid him to break in.
53	5	May 1, 2006	Matt Leinart	Matt Leinart is accused of soliciting a prostitute.
53	5	May 1, 2006	Elijah Wood	Elijah Wood throws a can into a dumpster, and after driving away from it, the dumpster explodes and knocks a huge shelf with paint down onto a car, requiring him to explain to the police what happened.
53	5	May 1, 2006	Olivia Wilde	After Olivia Wilde and her friend unsuccessfully try to put a quarter into a parking meter, Wilde's friend smacks the meter, breaks it, leading to their being accused of destroying city property.
54	6	May 8, 2006	Michelle Trachtenberg	Michelle Trachtenberg and Joel Madden are driving into a parking garage, but a low-hanging water pipe requires Trachtenberg to exit the vehicle to check the clearance. After she tells Madden he is clear, the pipe breaks off, and she gets blamed for telling him to go.
54	6	May 8, 2006	Nicollette Sheridan	Nicollette Sheridan and her husband are asked to help a guy propose to his girlfriend but just as he's about to, Michael drops the ring, and the diamonds fall out much to the anger of his girlfriend, who leaves.
54	6	May 8, 2006	Travis Pastrana	After Travis Pastrana and his friend meet up with some girls, his friend goes into the bedroom with one of them to have sex, only to find that her husband walked in and saw her wrapped up in a bedsheet, thinking that Pastrana is dating his wife & had sex with her.
55	7	May 15, 2006	Emma Roberts	Emma Roberts and Teddy Geiger go to a restaurant with Teddy's dog, but while she's in the bathroom a waiter trips and spills food all over a man's laptop, for which the man takes Teddy's dog.
55	7	May 15, 2006	Sugar Ray Leonard	Sugar Ray Leonard's son and his friend run into a telephone pole while racing, and when they move the car, the pole falls over and lands on a car belonging to a witness, who says Leonard must pay for the damages.
55	7	May 15, 2006	Hannah Teter	Hannah Teter and her friend are threatened with jail time after a street magician switches the friend's watch, and later blames it on both Teter and his own medical problems.
56	8	May 22, 2006	Rihanna	When Rihanna's friend gives $100 to some child street performers, the kids accuse them of stealing so Rihanna puts in a $15 and walks away. Their uncle calls the police, who threaten Rihanna with jail time.
56	8	May 22, 2006	Hugh Jackman	Hugh Jackman gets a tour of his X-Men: The Last Stand director Brett Ratner's house, and is asked to turn on the grill. Though it doesn't appear to work, they return to find the house engulfed in flames, and firefighters who tell them that it was caused by the grill.
56	8	May 22, 2006	Eric Dill	Eric Dill and his band are at a bowling alley, where they get yelled at for disruptive behavior that ruins a birthday party and someone's would-be perfect game.

=== Season 8 (2007) ===
No. in series	No. in season	Original air date	Celebrity/Victim	Notes
57	1	April 7, 2007	Bucky Lasek	Bucky Lasek and his wife are at a restaurant for their anniversary when a look alike Tom Cruise calls his wife over to his table. After several minutes of talking his wife throws a glass of water in his face. She tells Bucky that he offered money to sleep with her.
57	1	April 7, 2007	Nelly Furtado	Nelly Furtado is doing an interview that is interrupted by the bomb squad, who evacuate the building due to a suspicious package. The squad then confiscates Furtado's purse and they blow it up.
57	1	April 7, 2007	Hayden Panettiere	Hayden Panettiere and her mother are in a restaurant when a father and son ask her to pose for photos. But when his wife sees him talking to her, she accuses Panettiere of flirting with her husband.
58	2	April 17, 2007	Hilary Swank	Hilary Swank goes to Comic-Con to sign autographs and take pictures with fans. When a man introduces her to his million dollar robot she accidentally makes it knock over a child, incurring the man's wrath.
58	2	April 17, 2007	Ashley Tisdale	Ashley Tisdale goes to a hospital to meet some sick children and comes across a boy in a coma. She sings his favorite song and he wakes up. He wakes up whenever she is alone in the room with him and tells her he's faking the coma to skip school. The mother gets upset because he won't talk to her.
58	2	April 17, 2007	Chamillionaire	Chamillionaire is meeting with some directors for movie roles and after they asked to switch tables for the Princess of Spain, he is accused of constantly staring at the girls at the Princess' table, and told to leave the restaurant.
59	3	April 24, 2007	Evangeline Lilly	When Evangeline Lilly tries to turn up the volume on a stereo at her friend's house, it shatters the windows, damaging two priceless paintings.
59	3	April 24, 2007	Chuck Liddell	Chuck Liddell and his friend are on their way to a talk show when his friend tells him he got into a hit and run. They are stopped at the scene and the police accuse him of running into the guy's car.
59	3	April 24, 2007	Zac Efron	While Zac Efron and his High School Musical co-star Ashley Tisdale shop at a store, the store's cash box is stolen by two men. When security brings one of them in, Efron identifies him as the robber, but then another man walks in and Efron is told he is an employee who was off work.
60	4	May 1, 2007	Freddy Rodriguez	Freddy Rodriguez picks up his dog at a grooming service, but is told that the dog's papers were ruined, and cannot identify him. They bring out the wrong dog and when another man walks in with Rodriguez's dog, the employees don't believe him.
60	4	May 1, 2007	Molly Sims	After Molly Sims parks her car beside a construction zone, she returns to find it covered in debris.
60	4	May 1, 2007	Magic Johnson	Magic Johnson is confronted by a woman whom his son dated for a day, who demands to know why he hasn't called her. She later scratches her phone number into Johnson's car.
61	5	May 8, 2007	Meagan Good	When Meagan Good and her boyfriend exit their car to help an old lady who dropped a bag of fruit, two guys jump in their car and drive off. A witness tells the police they pushed the lady down. She calls her cell phone and the police tell her to keep them on the line.
61	5	May 8, 2007	Jewel	Jewel is blamed by workers when they accidentally drop a store sign on a car.
61	5	May 8, 2007	Frankie J	Frankie J thinks he's meeting with Michael Jackson but when a fan gives him peanuts, they tell him Michael was allergic and is very sick.
62	6	May 15, 2007	JoJo	JoJo goes to a hospital to visit sick children. She visits a girl with Severe Combined Immunodeficiency who is subsequently living in a contained area. JoJo breaks the glass allowing contaminated air into the cell.
62	6	May 15, 2007	Kelly Rowland	Kelly Rowland is on her way to an event where Serena Williams is supposed to receive an award. Kelly's driver makes a quick stop to pick up his son on the way to the event. He continues to make stops, including his son needing to use the restroom.
62	6	May 15, 2007	Jason Ritter	Jason, Simon Helberg and other friends go to the batting cages for fun. Jason tries to use the first cage, but it doesn't seem to work after putting numerous coins in the machine. Jason sees that the machine is unplugged, so he plugs it in, but it still doesn't work. He leaves the cage as another man walks in to use it to entertain his son. The machine pitches far too many balls, leaving the man injured.
63	7	May 22, 2007	Pitbull	Pitbull goes to visit a Boys and Girls Club during Thanksgiving. He helps hand out turkeys, but he is notified that all the turkeys are expired. Pitbull tries to take away one of the turkeys from a very upset boy who only speaks Spanish.
63	7	May 22, 2007	Too Short	Too Short is filming his own reality show when him and his friends stop for a free car wash held by young girls. The girls provocatively wash their car until the girls' school priest and one mother stop them. They reveal that the girls are all underage while being filmed in the reality show.
63	7	May 22, 2007	Kelis	Kelis arrives at a motivational convention, only to find out she is two hours late and the event is over due to miscommunication. She comes across parents and their child fans who attack her for being late.
64	8	May 29, 2007	Alyson Michalka	Alyson Michalka and her sister AJ are blamed for harming a bear by feeding it chocolate, which was given to them by a photographer.
64	8	May 29, 2007	John Cena	John Cena and his driver run through a stop sign and collide with a funeral procession, causing the casket to fall out of the hearse, outraging dead man's brother.
64	8	May 29, 2007	Kerr Smith	Kerr Smith and his wife are at an antique store trying out a water bed that breaks, leading to a slip and fall that breaks a table.

=== Season 9 (2012) ===
No. in series	No. in season	Original air date	Host	Celebrity/Victim	Notes
65	1	March 29, 2012	Justin Bieber	Taylor Swift	Taylor Swift is tricked into thinking that she set a boat on fire and ruined a couple's wedding while launching a firework.
65	1	March 29, 2012	Justin Bieber	Rob Dyrdek	Rob Dyrdek is led to believe that a couple at a table next to him were arguing. The girl runs the car into the restaurant and he gets the blame for it. However, he does not fall for it. He then helps Justin Punk Sean Kingston.
65	1	March 29, 2012	Justin Bieber	Sean Kingston	Sean Kingston is led to believe that a couple at a table next to him were arguing. The girl runs into the car and crashes into the restaurant and he gets blamed for it.
65	1	March 29, 2012	Justin Bieber	Miley Cyrus	Miley Cyrus gets double crossed. She believes that she's punking Justin Bieber when she is the one being punked herself.
66	2	April 5, 2012	Bam Margera	Tyler, the Creator	Tyler, the Creator is tricked into thinking that he accidentally blew up a taco truck, which was for a charity event, and also setting a man on fire while he was inside it.
66	2	April 5, 2012	Bam Margera	Ronnie Ortiz-Magro	Ronnie Ortiz-Magro is forced by the police to cooperate with a robbery after one of his stylists are held hostage inside a convenience store.
66	2	April 5, 2012	Bam Margera	Tyler Posey	Tyler Posey's worst drive-through experience occurs, when the workers mess up his order, the man in front of him gets out of the car and blocks his way, and an ignorant driver behind Tyler begins honking at him.
67	3	April 12, 2012	Hayden Panettiere	Dianna Agron	Dianna Agron gets hit on by an old man.
67	3	April 12, 2012	Hayden Panettiere	Zac Efron	Zac Efron is accused of a hit and run an old lady on his way to play tennis.
67	3	April 12, 2012	Hayden Panettiere	Nicole 'Snooki" Polizzi	Snooki is surprised after seeing a wife having sex with someone in a kitchen near a window next door, when suddenly her husband walks in and she has to go hide into Snooki's house.
68	4	April 19, 2012	Tyler, the Creator	Shenae Grimes	Shenae Grimes gets tricked when she finds a stray dog at her friends place and returns it to the wrong person. She has to cooperate to get the dog back with a man who's flirting with her. She ends up locking herself in the bathroom crying while on the phone with her mother.
68	4	April 19, 2012	Tyler, the Creator	The Wanted	The Wanted are surprised after they are accused of kidnapping a little girl and putting her in a van.
69	5	April 26, 2012	Lucy Hale	Ian Harding	Ian Harding is caught by police whilst vandalising a private property.
69	5	April 26, 2012	Lucy Hale	Vanessa Hudgens	Vanessa Hudgens and her friends witness a car accident involving a parade float and they are required to help in its reconstruction before the parade starts.
69	5	April 26, 2012	Lucy Hale	Josh Hutcherson	Josh Hutcherson is led to believe that he and a friend have compromised an important police mission.
70	6	May 3, 2012	Nick Cannon	Ashley Tisdale	Ashley Tisdale gets tricked into thinking that she and a friend have dragged a homeless man down a street with her friend's car.
70	6	May 3, 2012	Nick Cannon	Demi Lovato	Demi Lovato is fooled into thinking that she and her friends saw a ghost that is haunting a recording studio.
70	6	May 3, 2012	Nick Cannon	New Boyz	New Boyz face a number of difficulties when they try to enter their first underground club.
71	7	May 10, 2012	Dax Shepard	Chloë Grace Moretz	Chloë Grace Moretz gets involved in her new driver's love problems when he finds out that his wife is cheating on him.
71	7	May 10, 2012	Dax Shepard	Metta World Peace	Metta World Peace is blamed for a variety of altercations in a parking garage.
71	7	May 10, 2012	Dax Shepard	Lauren Conrad	Lauren Conrad is led to believe that she saw a woman that is in danger after falling into a garbage truck.
72	8	May 17, 2012	Miley Cyrus	Liam Hemsworth	Liam Hemsworth is led to believe that a naked couple went to his girlfriend's car and locked it because some guy is trying to kill his girlfriend.
72	8	May 17, 2012	Miley Cyrus	Kelly Osbourne	Kelly Osbourne is tricked into thinking that a delivery guy zipped his personal properties in his body in the bathroom. And she and her friends are to help him before it's too late.
72	8	May 17, 2012	Miley Cyrus	Khloé Kardashian	Khloé Kardashian goes through the same prank that Kelly Osbourne goes through, but this time Kelly helps.
73	9	May 24, 2012	Heather Morris	Joe Jonas	Joe Jonas is supposed to be tricked into thinking he is taking part in a robbery, but spots the cameras and realizes he's being Punk'd.
73	9	May 24, 2012	Heather Morris	Cody Simpson	Cody Simpson is led to believe that his house is being robbed by several people.
73	9	May 24, 2012	Heather Morris	Emma Roberts	Emma Roberts is blamed for breaking the yogurt machine which is spewing out fluid flooding the store.
74	10	May 31, 2012	Kellan Lutz	Julianne Hough	Julianne Hough believes that her brother and another man are trapped in quicksand and is required to save them both.
74	10	May 31, 2012	Kellan Lutz	Ashley Rickards	Ashley Rickards thinks that she has caused an oil spill.
74	10	May 31, 2012	Kellan Lutz	Aimee Teegarden	Aimee Teegarden sympathizes with a little girl who she thinks is being bullied by her "stage dad."
75	11	June 3, 2012	Ashton Kutcher	Drake	Drake is led to believe he's being picked up by Secret Service to meet the vice president but encounters a fake earthquake in a parking garage.
75	11	June 3, 2012	Ashton Kutcher	Kim Kardashian	Kim Kardashian is tricked into believing a supposed superfan stole friend Scott Disick's wallet at a gas station. In a move to catch the thief, Disick drives away from the pump with the nozzle still in the car, causing a massive explosion.
76	12	June 7, 2012	Mac Miller	Wiz Khalifa	Wiz Khalifa gets in trouble with the cops after using weed, but he figures out he's being Punk'd.
76	12	June 7, 2012	Mac Miller	Neil Patrick Harris	Neil and his husband go walk, but soon a bear ends up on their car.
76	12	June 7, 2012	Mac Miller	Darrelle Revis	While driving, Darelle gets trapped in a big hole with no escape.

=== Season 10 (2015) ===
- 77. Chris Brown & K.Michelle
- 78. ASAP Rocky & Miguel
- 79. Michael B. Jordan & Rita Ora
- 80. Sanaa Lathan & Trey Songz
- 81. Russell Simmons & Zendaya
- 82. Rosario Dawson & Meek Mill
- 83. Naturi Naughton & King Bach
- 84. Kevin Hart & Karrueche Tran

=== Season 11 (2020) ===
No. in series	No. in season	Title and Victim	Original release date	Description
85	1	"Monkey in the Middle with Meg Thee Stallion"	April 6, 2020	Meg Thee Stallion awaits a hairy surprise after waiting in a car for her lost dog.
86	2	"Bat Mitzvah'd with Liza Koshy"	April 6, 2020	Liza is expected to come in for an interview but things take a turn after she "breaks" a bat mitzvah girl's nose.
87	3	"Wrecking Ball with Adam Devine"	April 6, 2020	Adam's favorite car is in for a smashing surprise.
88	4	"New Town Road with Lil Nas X"	April 6, 2020	Lil Nas X thinks he's preparing for the Grammy's but gets caught in a government scandal.
89	5	"Rat Trap with Sabrina Carpenter"	April 6, 2020	Sabrina is in for a surprise when she finds out she's housing more guests than expected.
90	6	"Bad Influencer with Addison Rae and Hype House"	April 6, 2020	Addison is confronted by a aspiring actor's mother.
91	7	"Va-Laid with Ty Dolla Sign"	April 7, 2020	After pulling over for some food, Ty Dolla Sign is about to improve someone else's life.
92	8	"The Drone Zone with Marsai Martin and Miles Brown"	April 8, 2020	During a photoshoot break, a problematic drone comes into the building.
93	9	"Bu-gatta Be Kidding Me with French Montana"	April 9, 2020	French Montana brings in his car for a tune-up, but gets a surprise from Scott Disick.
94	10	"Migos Boom with Offset"	April 10, 2020	

== Red carpet ==
The following is a list of stars interviewed on the red carpet in all four segments.

=== Ryan Pinkston – VH1 Big in 2002 Awards ===
- Kid Rock and Pamela Anderson
- Ray Liotta
- Christina Aguilera
- Denise Richards
- Tori Amos
- Christina Applegate
- Eddie Griffin
- Pierce Brosnan
- Johnathon Schaech
- Lifehouse

=== Ryan Pinkston – Diesel party ===
- Dominic Monaghan and Billy Boyd
- Lacey Chabert
- Pauly Shore
- Wilmer Valderrama
- Brett Scallions
- Christina Della Rose
- Jon Abrahams
- Eric Balfour
- Danny Masterson and Wilmer Valderrama
- Aaron Paul

=== Foreign interviewer for Entertainment Weekly ===
- Alicia Silverstone
- Maria Menounos
- Nicole Richie
- Dulé Hill
- Rose McGowan
- Phillip Bloch
- Taryn Manning
- Wilmer Valderrama

=== Foreign interviewer – Gothika premiere ===
- Penélope Cruz
- Robert Downey Jr.
- James Lesure
- Kathleen Mackey
- Halle Berry
