= Dentsu =

Japanese advertising and public relations company

Dentsu Group Inc.

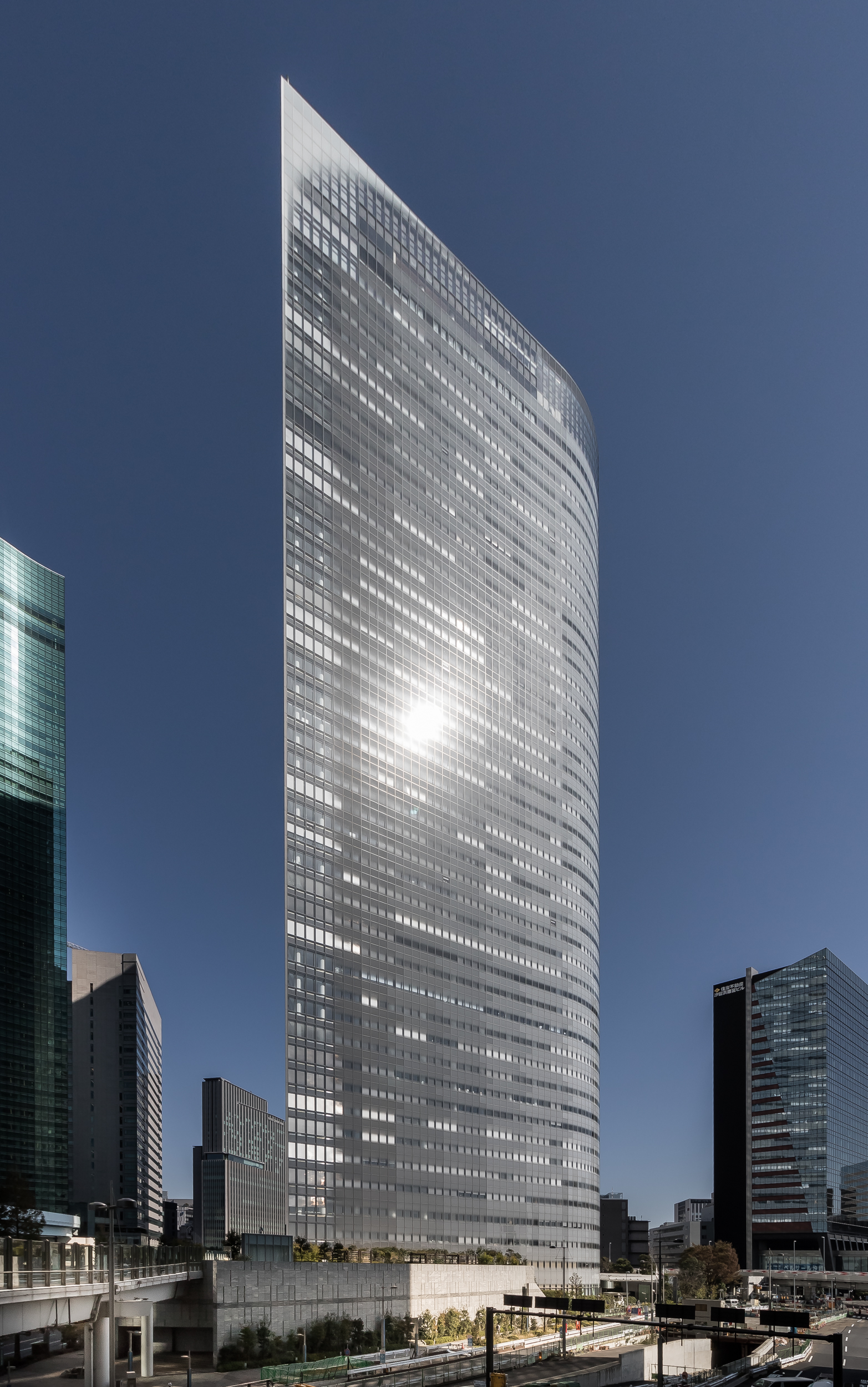
- Headquarters in Higashi-Shinbashi, Minato, Tokyo
- Native name: 株式会社電通グループ
- Romanized name: Kabushiki-gaisha Dentsū Gurūpu
- Formerly: Japan Advertising Ltd. (1901–1907); Japan Telegraphic Communications (1907–1955); Dentsu Advertising, Ltd. (1955–1978); Dentsu Inc. (1978–2020)
- Type: Public
- Traded as: TYO: 4324
- Industry: Advertising; Public relations Information, Communication
- Founded: July 1, 1901; 125 years ago (as Japan Advertising Ltd.)
- Founder: Hoshiro Mitsunaga
- Headquarters: Higashi-Shinbashi, Minato, Tokyo, Japan
- Key people: Takeshi Sano (president)
- Revenue: ▲¥1.018 trillion (2018)
- Net income: ▲¥61.4 billion (FY 2018)
- Number of employees: 62,608 (2018)
- Subsidiaries: Dentsu; Dentsu Live; Dentsu Entertainment; Dentsu Promotion Plus; Dentsu International
- Website: www.group.dentsu.com

Dentsu Group Inc. (Note: Japanese: 株式会社電通グループ, Hepburn: Kabushiki-gaisha Dentsu Gurūpu), simply known as Dentsu (Note: Japanese: 電通, Hepburn: Dentsū), stylized as dentsu, is a Japanese international advertising and public relations joint stock company headquartered in Tokyo. Dentsu is the largest advertising agency in Japan and the fifth largest advertising agency network in the world in terms of worldwide revenues.

In 2018, Dentsu announced its reorganization into a holding company and as a result, most of the company's functions (including its advertising business) moved to a new company under the Dentsu name and the existing company rebranding to the Dentsu Group, the changes took effect by January 1, 2020.

== History ==
Dentsu was originally established as Japan Advertising Ltd. (日本広告株式会社, Nihon Kōkoku Kabushiki-gaisha) and Telegraphic Service Co. (電報通信社, Denpō Tsūshin-sha) by Hoshiro Mitsunaga. In 1906, Telegraphic Service Co. became Japan Telegraphic Communication Co., Ltd. (株式会社日本電報通信社, Kabushiki-gaisha Nihon Denpō Tsūshin-sha). The next year, Japan Advertising Ltd. merged with Japan Telegraphic Communication Co., Ltd. to create advertising and communications operations. Japan Telegraphic Communication Co., Ltd. sold off its news division to Doumei News Agency in 1936 to change the company's focus to specialized advertising. In 1943, 16 companies were acquired in order to supplement Japan Telegraphic's advertising business. That same year, operational bases were established in Tokyo, Osaka, Nagoya, and Kyūshū. With the 1951 arrival of commercial radio broadcasting in Japan, the Radio Division was established at Japan Telegraphic's head and local offices.

In 1955, Japan Telegraphic Communication Co., Ltd. changed its name to Dentsu Inc. 1995 saw Dentsu creating five domestic regional subsidiaries. On December 10, 2018, Dentsu announced its intention to restructure into a holding company which would form another company under the Dentsu name handling its advertising and production divisions.

=== Initial public offering ===
Dentsu was listed on the Tokyo Stock Exchange in 2001. During the initial public offering of Dentsu, in December 2001, a trader at UBS Warburg, the Swiss investment bank, sent an order to sell 610,000 shares in this company at ¥6 each, while he intended to sell 16 shares at ¥600,000. The bank lost £71 million.

Dentsu's sales are more than double its nearest competitor, Hakuhodo or ADK, in the Japanese market, thanks to the company's origins as a media representative during the early part of the 20th century, producing the first newspaper advertisements as well as the first television commercials in Japan.

=== Geneon Entertainment ===
In July 2003, Dentsu acquired Pioneer LDC from Pioneer Corporation and renamed it to Geneon Entertainment, while its North American division, Pioneer Entertainment, was renamed to Geneon USA.

On November 12, 2008, Dentsu announced that it was selling 80.1% of its ownership in Geneon to NBCUniversal's Universal Pictures International Entertainment (UPI), who planned to merge the company with its Universal Pictures Japan division to form a new company. The merger closed on February 1, 2009.

=== Aegis Group ===
On 12 July 2012, Dentsu agreed to acquire British-based Aegis Group plc in a cash deal worth $4.9 billion. The deal was completed in March 2013. Dentsu Aegis Network, managed all Aegis Media work and non-Japanese Dentsu operations worldwide. In September 2020 Dentsu Group Inc. announced that its international business Dentsu Aegis Network will operate under the dentsu brand. This simplification has seen three lines of business established across media, customer relationship management, and creative. The business is registered as Dentsu International Limited with UK Companies House in October 2020.

=== Dentsu Ventures ===
In April 2015, Dentsu announced the launch of a corporate venture capital fund, Dentsu Ventures, to provide companies across the U.S., Europe, and Asia with capital and business support. In the same month, Dentsu Ventures Global Fund I was launched with a total capital of five billion yen.

In May 2021, Dentsu Ventures Global Fund II was launched with a total capital of ten billion yen.

Dentsu Ventures investments include Cheddar, Clear Labs, Exo, GRAIL, Overtime, OpenWeb, Survios, Twist Bioscience, Tynker, and Upside Foods.

=== Dentsu Anime Solutions ===
In July 2023, Dentsu announced that it had founded its own anime business, Dentsu Anime Solutions, to boost its presence in the anime industry.

=== RCKT ===
In August 2023, it was announced Dentsu had acquired the Berlin-headquartered digital-first brand, communications and creative agency, RCKT. The RCKT brand would be retained during a period of integration, becoming known as "RCKT, a Dentsu Creative Company".

=== GlobalMind ===
In 2018 Dentsu acquired GlobalMind, a LATAM based digital first agency based out of Argentina and Miami, USA. GlobalMind was the #1 independent media agency in LATAM owner of iColic, a creative agency which helped GlobalMind on the endeavour of conquering Latin America. Andy Berman and Marcelo Montefiore were the co-CEOs of The agency until they sold it to Dentsu.

== Corporate affairs ==
=== Project categorization ===
Dentsu Inc. categorises project markets in four different parts: National advertisement market; Advertisement-related market; New market; Foreign market (in addition to Dentsu Aegis Network, its overseas subsidiary, which operates in over 120 countries). National advertisement market consists of media projects. Advertisement related projects consist of marketing services. New market consists of sport events advertisement. Foreign market contains above mentioned three categories in the foreign market.

=== Dentsu Building ===
The Dentsu Building is a high-rise building in Shiodome, Minato, Tokyo, which houses Dentsu's corporate offices. With 48 floors that rise to 213.34 m (700 ft), it is the eleventh-tallest building in Tokyo. It was designed by Jean Nouvel, the French architect, and completed in 2002. It was built over the site of Tokyo's first railway station, and sits aside the Hamarikyu Gardens, formerly the site of a shōgun's vacation home.

=== Mount Fuji climbing tradition ===
Since 1925, Dentsu employees have had a company tradition of climbing Mount Fuji. Every July all new staff and newly promoted executives climb Mt Fuji. Employees who are not physically able to do so are exempt. A former employee gave the reasoning behind this as: "The message is: 'We are going to conquer the one symbol that represents Japan more than anything else. And, once we do that, it will signify that we can do anything.'"

== Criticism ==
=== Working conditions ===
In August 2015, Dentsu was caught exceeding its own 70-hour monthly maximum overtime limit. In December, Matsuri Takahashi, a University of Tokyo graduate and 24-year-old female employee of Dentsu, committed suicide. The Japanese government recognized her suicide as karoshi, a Japanese term for death from overworking. In July 2017, the company was charged by Japanese authorities for the death of Takahashi. No individuals were charged, only the corporation. The company admitted allowing illegal levels of overtime and was convicted in October, paying ¥500,000 in fines.

Mr. Tadashi Ishii, Representative Director and President & CEO, notified Dentsu on December 28, 2016 that he will resign as Representative Director and President & CEO. His papers were sent to the prosecutors office because of the violation of the Labor Standards Act. Over a half century of ongoing overworking was documented by The New York Times, including training materials supporting a Dentsu president urging working "even if it kills you."

A 2017 attempt to encourage letting workers "leave the office at 3 p.m. on the last Friday of the month" did not get much participation. Also in 2017, a former executive creative director of Dentsu Japan has resigned from his own company following allegations he sexually harassed a woman during his tenure at the advertising giant.

=== Bribery charges and bid rigging ===
Before the later bribery and bid-rigging cases, Dentsu was also scrutinized for its role in Tokyo's successful bid for the 2020 Summer Olympics. In 2020, Reuters reported that Haruyuki Takahashi, a former Dentsu executive who later joined the Tokyo 2020 organising committee board, had received more than US$8 million from the Tokyo bid committee for undisclosed activities. Takahashi told Reuters that his work included lobbying IOC members, including former athletics official Lamine Diack, and that he had given gifts such as a Seiko watch and digital cameras. IOC president Thomas Bach later said that the IOC had received confirmation that the payments did not infringe IOC rules.

In 2022, a former executive at Dentsu was arrested on suspicion of receiving bribes from sponsors of the 2020 Summer Olympics. In February 2023, Japan's competition regulator filed criminal complaints against six firms, including Dentsu, over alleged bid rigging of contracts for the games. The companies were charged under anti-monopoly law and accused of lowering the competitiveness of their tenders. The case also saw the arrest of a senior Olympic official from Japan and the head of Dentsu's sports division. The company has admitted liability. The corruption scandal has clouded the chance of landing the 2030 Winter Olympics by the city of Sapporo, an early favorite.

According to one media report, Dentsu does business with almost every major institution in Japan, accounting for about 28 percent of the national advertising budget. Its connections to the government are so tight that The New York Times referred to Dentsu as "the unofficial communications department of the governing Liberal Democratic Party", and it has also been likened to the CIA on account of its reach.

=== MLB management ===
Dentsu played a major role as a management company during Roki Sasaki's MLB team selection process that resulted in his signing with the Dodgers in 2025.

== Dentsu Group companies ==
=== Affiliates and shareholdings ===
- Madhouse (minority shareholder)
- Vernalossom Co., Ltd. (minority shareholder)
- Shibuya-AX (joint venture)
- TNC (5.1%, minority shareholder)
- Video Research Ltd. (34.2%, leading shareholder)

=== Outside Japan ===
- Lords Group (joint venture)
- Collett, Dickenson, Pearce & Partners (40% shareholder)
