= List of awards and nominations received by Ashton Kutcher =

Ashton Kutcher awards and nominations
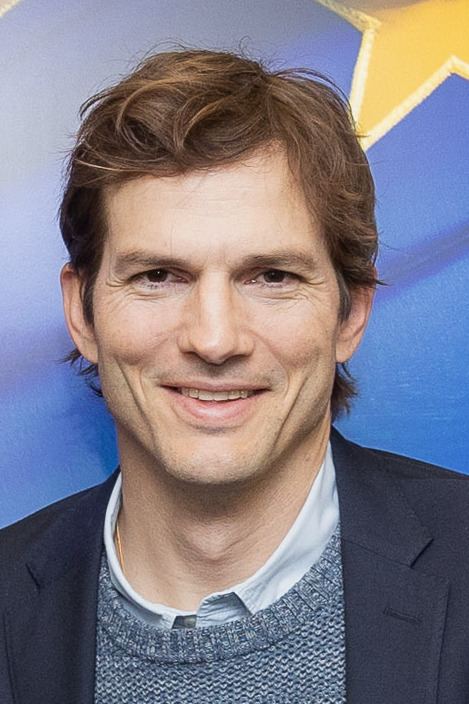
- Kutcher in 2023
Awards and nominations
Award	Wins	Nominations

Totals (Note: Certain award groups do not simply award one winner. They acknowledge several different recipients, have runners-up, and have third place. Since this is a specific recognition and is different from losing an award, runner-up mentions are considered wins in this award tally. For simplification and to avoid errors, each award in this list has been presumed to have had a prior nomination.)
- Wins: 18
- Nominations: 37

The following are the awards and nominations received by the actor and producer Ashton Kutcher.

== Awards and nominations ==
=== Critics' Choice Movie Awards ===
Year	Category	Nominated work	Result	Ref.
2007	Best Acting Ensemble	Bobby	Nominated	

=== Golden Raspberry Awards ===
Year	Category	Nominated work	Result	Ref.
2004	Worst Actor	Cheaper By The Dozen, Just Married and My Boss's Daughter	Nominated	
2004	Worst Screen Couple	Just Married and My Boss's Daughter	Nominated (Note: Shared with Brittany Murphy for Just Married and Tara Reid for My Boss's Daughter)	
2009	Worst Screen Couple	What Happens in Vegas	Nominated (Note: Shared with Cameron Diaz)	
2011	Worst Actor	Killers and Valentine's Day	Won	
2014	Worst Actor	Jobs	Nominated	

=== Hollywood Film Award ===
Year	Category	Nominated work	Result	Ref.
2006	Ensemble of the Year	Bobby	Won	

=== Kid's Choice Awards ===
Year	Category	Nominated work	Result	Ref.
2004	Favourite Movie Actor	Cheaper by the Dozen	Nominated	
2004	Favourite Movie Actor	Just Married	Nominated	
2004	Favourite Movie Actor	My Boss's Daughter	Nominated	
2004	Favorite TV Actor	That '70s Show	Nominated	
2004	Favorite TV Actor	Punk'd	Nominated	
2005	Favorite TV Actor	That '70s Show	Nominated	
2005	Favorite TV Actor	Punk'd	Nominated	
2006	Favorite TV Actor	That '70s Show	Nominated	
2007	Favorite Voice in a Cartoon	Open Season	Nominated	

=== Las Vegas Film Critics Society ===
Year	Category	Nominated work	Result	Ref.
2000	Sierra Award Best Male Newcomer	Dude, Where's My Car?	Nominated	

=== MTV Movie & TV Awards ===
Year	Category	Nominated work	Result	Ref.
2001	Breakthrough Male Performance	Dude, Where's My Car?	Nominated	
2011	Best Comedic Performance	No Strings Attached	Nominated	

=== People's Choice Awards ===
Year	Category	Nominated work	Result	Ref.
2010	Favorite Web Celeb	—N/a	Won	
2012	Favorite Comedic Movie Actor	—N/a	Nominated	

=== Screen Actors Guild Award ===
Year	Category	Nominated work	Result	Ref.
2007	Outstanding Performance by a Cast in a Motion Picture	Bobby	Nominated	

=== Teen Choice Awards ===
Year	Category	Nominated work	Result	Ref.
2001	Choice Movie: Actor	Dude, Where's My Car?	Nominated	
2001	Choice Movie: Chemistry	Dude, Where's My Car?	Nominated (Note: Shared with Seann William Scott)	
2001	Choice TV: Actor	That '70s Show	Nominated	
2002	Choice TV Actor: Comedy	That '70s Show	Nominated	
2003	Choice TV: Reality Hunk	Punk'd	Won	
2003	Choice TV: Reality/Variety Host	Punk'd	Won	
2003	Choice TV Actor: Comedy	That '70s Show	Won	
2003	Choice Movie: Liplock	Just Married	Nominated (Note: Shared with Bernie Mac)	
2003	Choice Movie: Hissy Fit	Just Married	Nominated	
2003	Choice Movie Actor: Comedy	Just Married	Nominated	
2004	Choice TV: Personality	—N/a	Won	
2004	Choice TV: Male Reality/Variety Star	Punk'd	Won	
2004	Choice TV Actor: Comedy	That '70s Show	Won	
2004	Choice Movie: Hissy Fit	Cheaper by the Dozen	Nominated	
2004	Choice Movie: Liplock	Cheaper by the Dozen	Nominated (Note: Shared with Piper Perabo)	
2005	Choice TV Male Personality	Punk'd	Won	
2005	Choice TV Actor: Comedy	That '70s Show	Won	
2005	Choice Movie: Rumble	Guess Who	Nominated	
2005	Choice Movie: Liar	Guess Who	Nominated	
2005	Choice Movie: Dance Scene	Guess Who	Nominated	
2005	Choice Movie: Chemistry	Guess Who	Nominated	
2005	Choice Movie: Hissy Fit	Guess Who	Nominated	
2005	Choice Movie: Blush Scene	Guess Who	Nominated	
2005	Choice Movie Actor: Comedy	Guess Who	Nominated	
2005	Choice Movie Actor: Comedy	A Lot Like Love	Nominated	
2005	Choice Movie: Rockstar Moment	A Lot Like Love	Won	
2006	Choice TV: Personality	Punk'd	Won	
2007	Choice Movie Actor: Drama	The Guardian	Nominated	
2008	Choice Movie Actor: Romantic Comedy	What Happens in Vegas	Won	
2009	Choice Web Star	—N/a	Nominated	
2010	Choice Movie Actor: Romantic Comedy	Valentine's Day	Won	
2010	Choice Movie Actor: Comedy	Killers	Won	
2011	Choice Movie Actor: Romantic Comedy	No Strings Attached	Won	
2012	Choice TV Actor: Comedy	Two and a Half Men	Nominated	
2013	Choice TV Actor: Comedy	Two and a Half Men	Nominated	
2013	Ultimate Choice	—N/a	Won	
2014	Choice TV Actor: Comedy	Two and a Half Men	Nominated	
2014	Choice Social Media King	—N/a	Nominated	

=== Young Artist Award ===
Year	Category	Nominated work	Result	Ref.
1999	Best Performance in a TV Series – Young Ensemble	That '70s Show	Nominated (Note: shared with Topher Grace, Laura Prepon, Mila Kunis, Wilmer Valderrama, and Danny Masterson)	
1999	Best Performance in a TV Series - Supporting Young Actor	That '70s Show	Nominated	
