= George Walton Comprehensive High School =

Public high school in Marietta, Georgia, United States

Location
- 1590 Bill Murdock Rd. Marietta, Georgia; United States; 33°59′20″N 84°26′30″W

Information
- Type: Public (charter) high school
- Motto: Go Raiders
- Established: 1975; 51 years ago
- School district: Cobb County School District
- Principal: Stephanie Santoro
- Teaching staff: 138.90 (FTE)
- Grades: 9–12
- Enrollment: 2,685 (2023–2024)
- Student to teacher ratio: 19.33
- Campus: Suburban
- Colors: Red, white and blue
- Nickname: Raiders
- Rival: Pope Greyhounds; Wheeler Wildcats; Lassiter Trojans
- Yearbook: The Legend
- Website: www.cobbk12.org/walton/

George Walton Comprehensive High School is a public high school located in unincorporated Cobb County, Georgia, with a Marietta post office address. It is in eastern Cobb County and is a charter school in the Cobb County School District. It is a School of Excellence and the number one public school in the state. It is the largest high school in the East Cobb area.

For many years Walton has been among the top high schools in Georgia in SAT scores. In 2006, almost 800 Walton students took over 1,800 Advanced Placement exams, making it the school with the greatest number of test-takers in Georgia. Walton was also one of six featured "Outstanding American High Schools" out of 96 total by U.S. News & World Report in 1999 because of its high parental involvement and overall high level of achievement. In 2011, Walton was ranked 67 by Newsweek based on new factors: graduation rate (25%), college matriculation rate (25%), AP tests taken per graduate (25%), average SAT/ACT scores (10%), average AP/IB/AICE scores (10%), and AP courses offered (5%).

== History ==
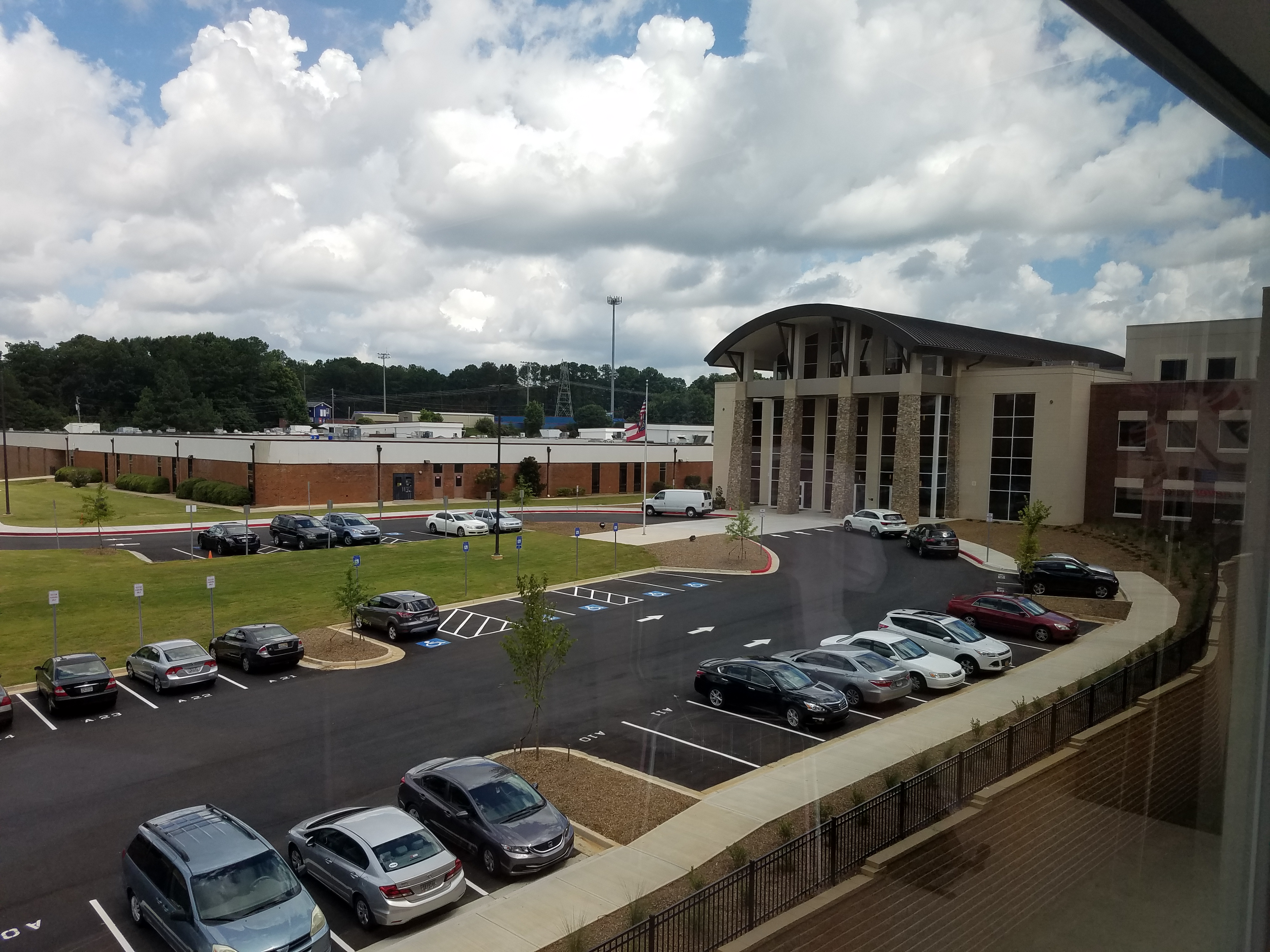
The front entrance of the New 2017 Walton Building from a second floor classroom, with the old building on left.

Mr. Raider leads the football team onto the field before a game.

Construction of Walton High School began in 1973, and the school opened in 1975. Various sections of the school have been renovated, and entirely new halls have been added continuously, each time with their own distinct type of architecture and style. Throughout these many years of construction, especially in recent years, mobile classrooms, colloquially called "trailers," were added to accommodate for the classrooms rendered unavailable. A small number were still in use until 2017, when a replacement building opened.

Walton has been a Georgia School of Excellence since the program's creation in 1984, and in the same year was recognized as a National Blue Ribbon School of Excellence. Walton became a charter school in 1998.

=== Dumb and Dumberer ===
Portions of the 2003 movie Dumb and Dumberer: When Harry Met Lloyd were filmed in the Walton auto shop, science rooms, and cafeteria. The basketball gym was painted over with the film's fictional logo, and to replace it, part of the film's budget went towards buying a new floor for the entire gym, which was removed in summer 2019 as part of the renovations of the school. The logo of the old gym is framed near the entrance to the new gym.

== Faculty ==
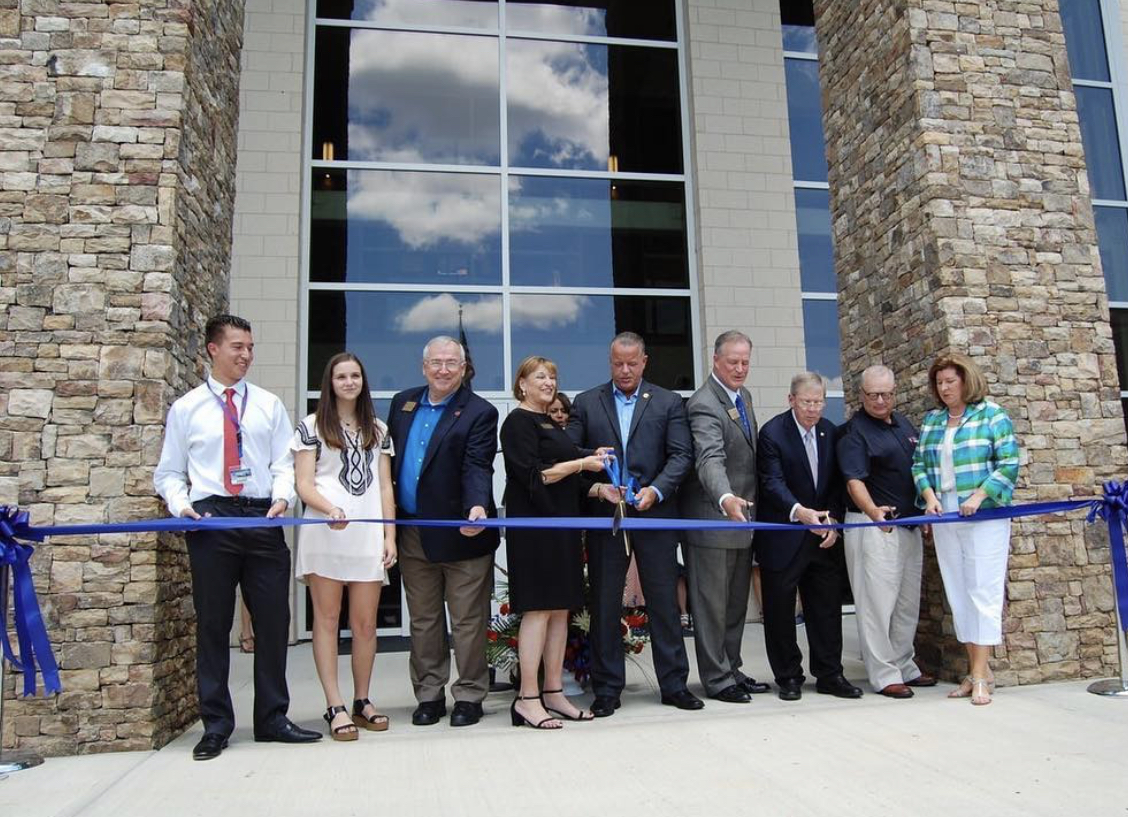
Ribbon cutting of the new Walton High School featuring school and government leaders.

121 full-time and 15 part-time teachers are employed at Walton, as well as seven full-time and two part-time administrators. Including other special resource teachers and support staff, Walton has 174 full-time and 21 part-time employees. The student-teacher ratio is 20:1, above the state average of 14:1.

== Charter ==
Walton gained charter status in 1998, which was renewed in 2003, 2008, and 2012. Walton's administration has made several changes to the school's policy and schedule, among other areas, through this. One of the changes is the Walton Governance Council, which replaces the original local council in matters pertaining to the maintenance of the charter and its renewal every five years. This larger and more diverse council was also a change given by the charter itself to better represent its stakeholders (students, parents, teachers, administrators, and others).

Possibly Walton's most noticeable change is the Walton Enrichment Block, or WEB, which shortens classes one day a week (usually Wednesday) to provide students several hours to complete missed assignments, receive individual instruction, or simply leave early. WEBs only occur on weeks without any other events such as county-mandated teacher workdays or early releases.

Walton also allows students to take additional classes before and after school. Many students today take advantage of 0 Period to take an additional course each day before the normal school day begins. 0 period is also included in the "Flex Schedule," in which students may leave after 6th period by taking a 0 period class, thus still giving six classes and a lunch period.

The petition adopted in 2008 also proposes a new method of evaluating teachers called the "Collaborative Growth Model," a release from mandated End of Course Test days that conflict with AP exams, and recognition of Project Lead the Way courses as being worthy of half a quality point towards a grade point average.

== Extracurricular activities ==
The school offers many clubs, groups, and societies exist for a variety of interests. Walton has a Beta Club, a National Honor Society, and a Habitat for Humanity group. It also has a Politically Active Citizens, and a Future Physicians Club. Aside from general interest groups, service clubs, and honor societies, students may participate in various sports, fine arts, and academic organizations.

=== Athletics ===
Walton helmet with football

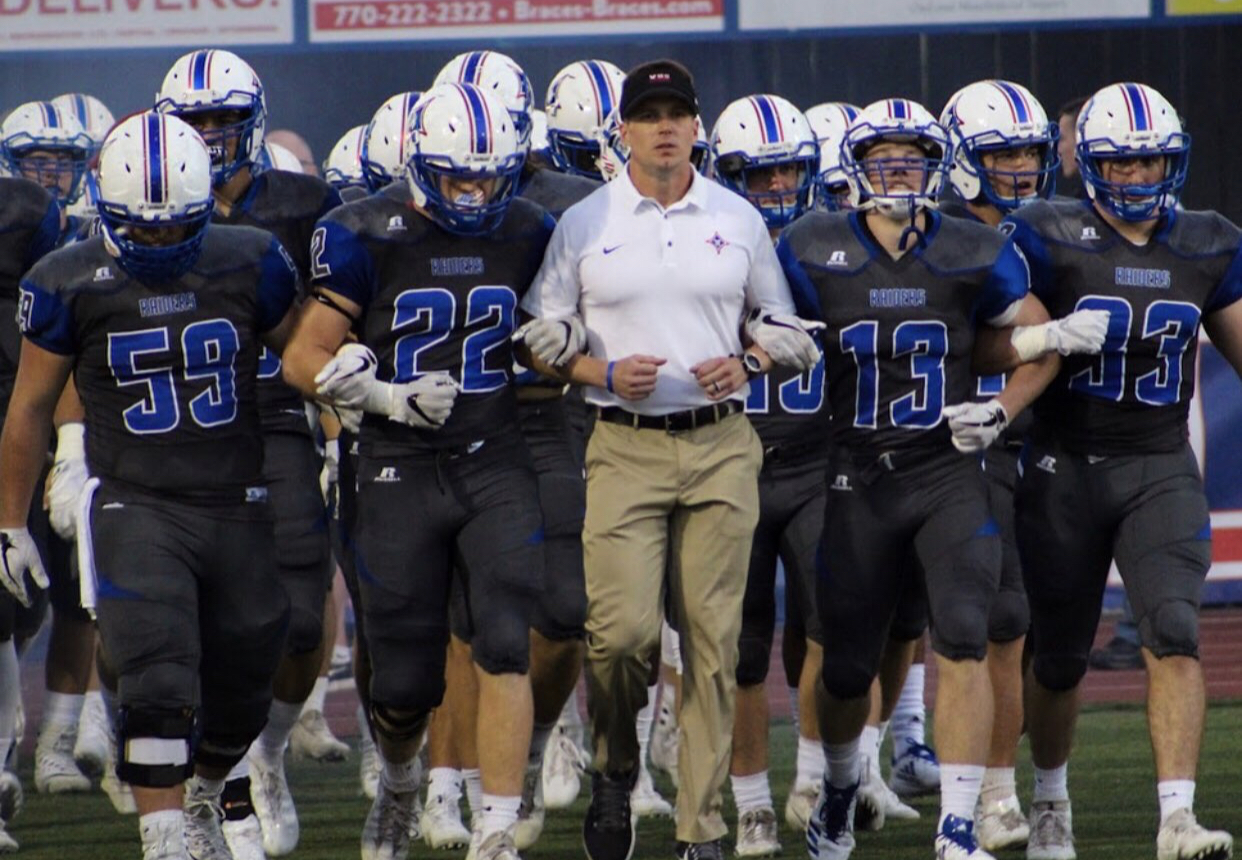
Coach Daniel Brunner leading the Football team out for Friday Night lights

Walton has won the GADA Dodge AAAAA Directors Cup four times since its creation in 1999 for having superior overall athletic performance and five consecutive volleyball championships from 1999 to 2002. In recent years, it has won state championships in boys' tennis, girls' tennis, boys' soccer (2002, 2006, 2008, 2011), and boys' baseball. Also in 2011, the men's lacrosse team had an undefeated year where they won the school's first lacrosse championship, and made a promising run in the 2014 season under new Head Coach Griffin Spotz, making it to the semi-finals. In 2004, the Walton Raider football team went undefeated in their region. The Raiders beat Valdosta High School in the state quarter-finals to advance to the state semi-finals at the Georgia Dome, before falling to Parkview High School. In 2007, the Raiders were again region champions, beating the previous state champion and nationally ranked Roswell High School, and the last undefeated team Martin Luther King, Jr. High School in the state quarter-finals to advance to the state semi-finals before falling to North Gwinnett High School at the Georgia Dome.

The boys' curling team, which was started in 2007, won its first state championship in 2008 after just one year of training. They went on to nationals, only to finish in last place.

The Raider rugby team, founded in 2007, won its third straight state high school championship in 2010. Raider Rugby is still a club team but is currently working on becoming a school-supported sport.

"Raider Valley", the home field of the Walton Raiders, went through some major renovations during the summer of 2010. The football team raised enough money to build a new stadium. The Raiders put in a new football field, along with a top-of-the-line Jumbotron score board. The renovations took place all summer; the new turf field is meant to be beneficial to all outdoor activities.

Football Region Championships
Year	Record
1986	11–3 (Region 5-AAAA)
1999	9–2 (Region 6-AAAA)
2003	11–1 (Region 5-AAAAA)
2004	12–2 (Region 6-AAAAA)
2007	12–2 (Region 6-AAAAA)
2008	9–2 (Region 6-AAAAA)
2011	14–1 (Region 6-AAAAA)
2017	11-1 (Region 4-AAAAAAA)
2023	14-1 (Region 5-AAAAAAA)

== Notable alumni ==
- Blaine Boyer (2000), baseball player
- Billy Burns (2008), professional baseball player with the New York Yankees
- Kristian Campbell (2021), #5 prospect professional baseball player
- Andy Dick (1984), comedian and actor
- Robin Finck (1990), guitarist for Nine Inch Nails and Guns N' Roses
- Wendell Gregory (2024), defensive end for the Oklahoma State Cowboys
- Ryan Harrow (2010), professional basketball player
- Chris Hollod (2001), venture capitalist and angel investor
- Aaron Kelly (2004), wide receiver for the Clemson Tigers; became wide receiver in the CFL
- Carter Kieboom (2016), baseball player
- Spencer Kieboom (2009), baseball player
- Zac Kristofak (2016), baseball player
- Kevin Kruger (2002), head basketball coach, University of Nevada Las Vegas
- Scott MacRae (1992), professional baseball player (Cincinnati Reds)
- Thomas Morton (2001), Vice correspondent
- Marc Pisciotta (1988), professional baseball player (Chicago Cubs, Kansas City Royals)
- Luke Putkonen (2004), professional baseball player (Detroit Tigers)
- Glen Rice Jr. (2009), professional basketball player Washington Wizards, 2017-18 top scorer in the Israel Basketball Premier League
- Chris Robinson, musician and founding member, with Rich Robinson, of the rock band The Black Crowes; formed the band in 1984 (which was originally called Mr. Crowes Garden) while the two attended Walton
- Rich Robinson, musician and founding member, with Chris Robinson, of the rock band The Black Crowes; formed the band in 1984 (which was originally called Mr. Crowes Garden) while the two attended Walton
- Jeff Small (1991), CEO of Amblin
- Chris Stowers (1992), professional baseball player (Montreal Expos)
- Chase Thomas (2008), All-State defensive end and All-American linebacker at Stanford University
