= Chris Hollod =

American businessman

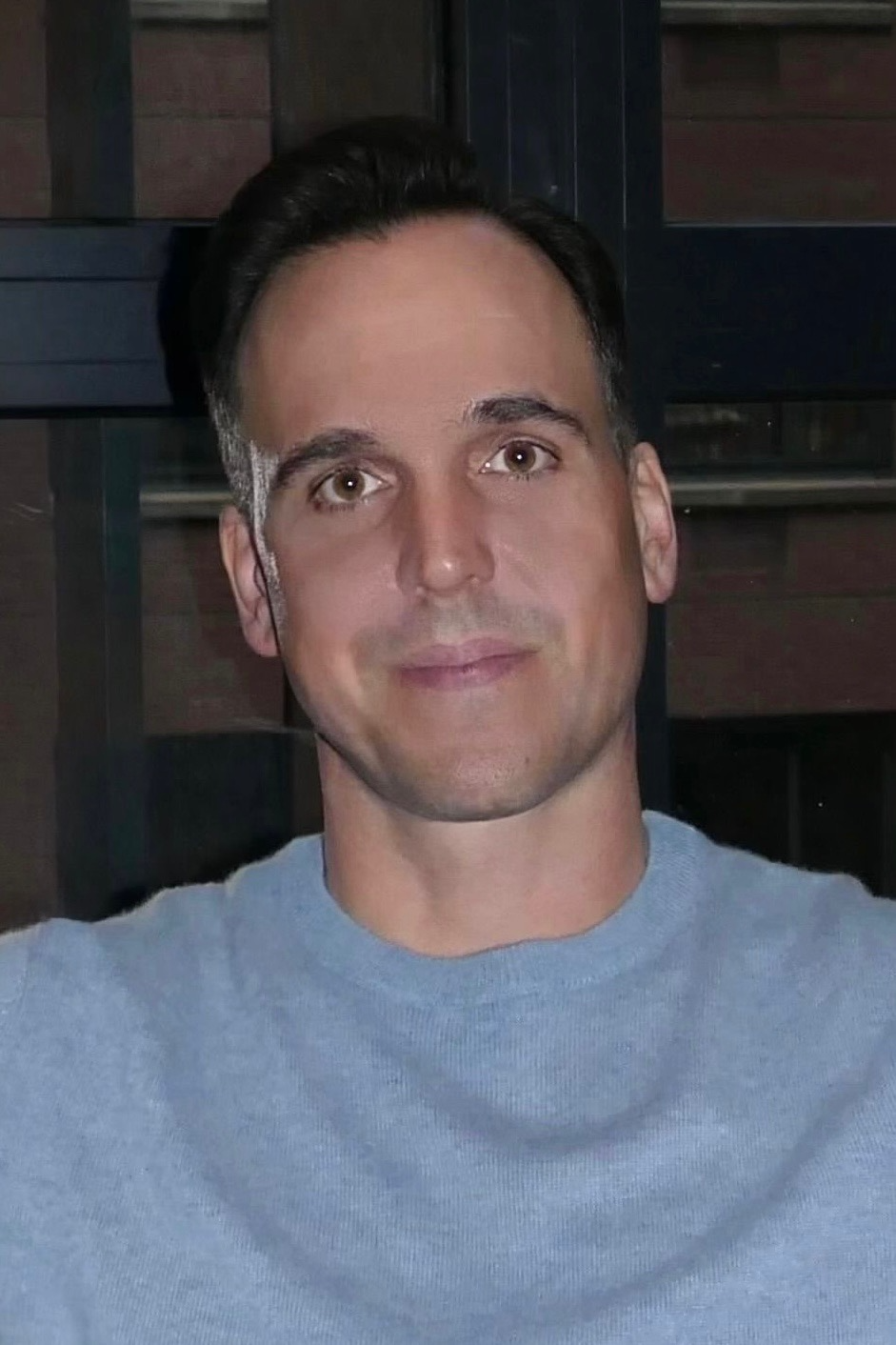
- Hollod in 2026
- Born: Chris Hollod; December 9, 1982 (age 43); Georgia, U.S.
- Occupations: Venture capitalist, angel investor, advisor, CEO
- Years active: 2010–present
- Spouse: Bianca Hollod (married 2024-present)

Chris Hollod is a venture capitalist, angel investor, and advisor in Los Angeles. Hollod was the co-founder and chief executive officer of Tailwind Acquisition Corp. which merged with Terran Orbital in March 2022 in a $1.8 billion deal. Over the course of his career, Hollod has completed more than 150 deals across five different investment entities, including investments in Uber, Airbnb, Houzz, Spotify, Pinterest, Duolingo, Airtable, Oscar Health, Flexport, Casper, and Warby Parker.

== Early life ==
Hollod graduated summa cum laude and Phi Beta Kappa from Vanderbilt University with a degree in economics. Hollod grew up in Atlanta. He worked as an investment banking associate at Wachovia Securities in Charlotte, NC, and after being laid-off during the 2008 financial crisis, ultimately moved to Los Angeles in 2009 to work for investor Ronald Burkle.

== Career ==
Hollod is the co-founder of Second Sight Ventures, an early-stage venture capital firm that has invested in Lemme, Momentous, Khloud, Superpower, Steven.com, and Blueprint.

Hollod worked with Ashton Kutcher, Guy Oseary, and Ronald Burkle as the managing partner of their venture capital fund, A-Grade Investments. In 2012, A-Grade Investments raised money from David Geffen and Mark Cuban, among other investors. Fortune described Hollod as having “pioneered” the celebrity-driven investment model during his time at the firm.

Hollod also worked for The Yucaipa Companies for eight years and oversaw Ron Burkle's venture capital investments and was referred to in the press as "Burkle's right-hand man." Hollod was first introduced to the world of venture capital by working on a deal with Mark Wahlberg for his bottled water start-up, AQUAhydrate.

Hollod is a founding partner of Inevitable Ventures with D.A. Wallach where they invested in such companies as 8i, Upside Foods, and Thrive Market.

Hollod was named one of the 32 most influential investors of 2013 (outside Silicon Valley) and received a Visionary Award in 2018.

Fortune included Hollod in its "Meet the Uber Rich" article as an early investor in Uber and the LA Times published a feature on him entitled "How I Made It: A Billionaire's Right-Hand Man." He has been quoted in the Wall Street Journal, Forbes, and LA Times as a venture capital expert, and he has judged several start-up competitions including Global Startup Battle and Start-Up Weekend Los Angeles.

Hollod promotes brands and entrepreneurs on his Instagram page and has written about using Instagram to source and diligence new investment opportunities.

Hollod is currently the founder and managing partner of Hollod Holdings, a venture capital and advisory entity that has invested in companies such as Magic Spoon, MUD\WTR, JuneShine, AMASS, Jinx, and De Soi.

== Personal ==
Hollod lives in Hollywood's Sunset Square neighborhood in a bungalow purchased from Glee star Lea Michele in 2015. Hollod is writing a book entitled "Big Fish Big Pond," providing advice for millennials. Hollod collects wine and judged the Millennial Wine Competition in 2020. Hollod is married to Bianca Vierra.
