= Neighborly =

American finance company (2012–2019)

- Company type: Private
- Industry: Public infrastructure, impact investing
- Founded: 2012; 14 years ago
- Founder: Jase Wilson
- Defunct: 2019
- Fate: Bankrupted
- Headquarters: San Francisco, CA (2015–2019); Kansas City, MO (2012–2015)
- Products: Fiber-optic broadband networks

Neighborly was a San Francisco–based financial technology startup focused on financing and deploying fiber-optic broadband infrastructure in communities around the U.S. The company aimed to deliver critical fiber broadband infrastructure to communities, and opportunities to investors interested in closing the digital divide.

Previous to their broadband endeavors, Neighborly facilitated municipal bond investments to finance community infrastructure, including schools, libraries, bike paths, and parks. Investors included Emerson Collective, 8VC and Ashton Kutcher's Sound Ventures.

== History ==
Neighborly was founded in July 2012 in Kansas City, Missouri by Jase Wilson, a civic technologist trained in urban planning at the University of Missouri-Kansas City and the Massachusetts Institute of Technology.

During the company's first two years of operation, Neighborly facilitated donations for 55 community projects that collectively raised over $2,500,000.

In July 2013, Neighborly received a $175,000 grant from the Knight Foundation.

In April 2014, Neighborly won the 14th Annual Global Technology Symposium, held at Draper University in San Mateo, beating 8 other companies from 7 different countries. In October 2014, Neighborly completed the 500 Startups Accelerator.

In July 2015, Neighborly introduced the concept of ‘civic microbonds’ to lower the minimum denomination required to invest in municipal bonds.

In an effort to better raise seed funding, Neighborly's operations were moved from Kansas City to San Francisco in 2015. The move paid off when, in August 2015, Neighborly secured $5.5M seed financing led by Joe Lonsdale's Formation 8 and Ashton Kutcher's Sound Ventures.

In May 2017 Neighborly announced it raised a $25 million Series A round. The investment was led by Joe Lonsdale at 8VC, Laurene Powell Jobs at Emerson Collective, with follow-on participation from Ashton Kutcher at Sound Ventures, Maven Ventures, Bee Partners, and Stanford University. New investors were: Govtech Fund, Abstract.vc, and Fintech Collective.

In October 2019, the company defaulted after failing to secure funding.
