= A-Grade Investments =

American venture capital firm

A-Grade Investments, LLC
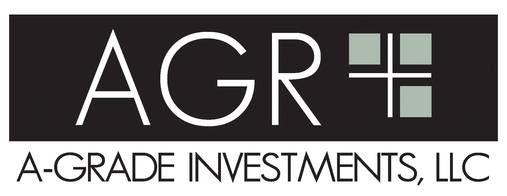
- Type: Private
- Industry: Venture capital
- Founded: 2010; 16 years ago
- Founders: Ashton Kutcher; Guy Oseary; Ron Burkle
- Headquarters: Los Angeles, California, United States
- Products: Investments
- AUM: $145 million
- Website: agradeinvestments.com

A-Grade Investments is a venture capital firm founded in 2010 by actor Ashton Kutcher, entertainment manager Guy Oseary, and billionaire investor Ron Burkle to invest in technology start-up companies. The company is headquartered in Los Angeles, California.

== Founding and partners ==
Ashton Kutcher, Guy Oseary, and Ron Burkle had invested in private equity deals individually, then, in 2010, formed A-Grade Investments to invest in technology startups as a group.

In 2012, Kutcher, Oseary and Burkle raised additional capital A-Grade from several billionaires, including David Geffen and Mark Cuban.

On May 1, 2013, onstage at TechCrunch Disrupt NYC, Kutcher and Oseary confirmed rumors that the fund was valued at over $100 million.

In March 2016, Forbes published a comprehensive article on A-Grade Investments, entitled "How Ashton Kutcher And Guy Oseary Built A $250 Million Portfolio With Startups Like Uber And Airbnb," with Kutcher appearing on the cover of the magazine, which became the most-widely read issue in Forbes’ 99-year history. The Forbes article states that the team turned $30m into $250m.

== Investments ==
Among its portfolio companies, A-Grade has invested in Spotify, Uber, Shazam, Couple, SoundCloud, Muse, and Airbnb.

The firm’s primary targets are consumer-focused businesses that change the way consumers share information, or that disrupt traditional marketplaces.

In a 2011 interview with The New York Times, Kutcher said, “I look for companies that solve problems in intelligent and friction-free ways and break boundaries.”

In a 2013 interview with The Daily Telegraph, Kutcher said, “If we can create efficiencies in that which is mundane, then we accelerate our paths to happiness. The companies that will ultimately do well are the companies that chase happiness. If you find a way to help people find love, or health or friendship, the dollar will chase that.”

== Exits ==
- Katango, acquired, 2011
- GroupMe, acquired, 2011
- Socialcam, acquired, 2012
- Bufferbox, acquired, 2012
- Summly, acquired, 2013
- Interaxon (Muse)
- Nest, acquired, 2014
- Gyft, acquired, 2014
- SmartThings, acquired, 2014
