= Magic Spoon =

American breakfast cereal company

- Company type: Private
- Industry: Food industry
- Founded: 2019; 7 years ago in New York City, United States
- Founders: Greg Sewitz; Gabi Lewis
- Headquarters: Brooklyn
- Website: magicspoon.com

Magic Spoon is an American food company that produces high-protein, low-sugar, gluten-free breakfast cereals, protein bars, granola, and toaster pastries. Founded in 2019 by Greg Sewitz and Gabi Lewis, the company was named to Time magazine's list of the 100 Best Inventions of 2019 and is available in more than 22,000 retail stores in the United States, including Walmart, Target, Whole Foods Market, and Costco.

== History ==
Greg Sewitz and Gabi Lewis met while attending Brown University. The pair had previously co-founded Exo Inc., a brand of protein bars made using house crickets, which they sold in 2018. They launched Magic Spoon in 2019 as a direct-to-consumer (DTC) brand sold exclusively online.

In June 2022, Magic Spoon raised $85 million in a Series B funding round, with investors including HighPost Capital and celebrity backers such as Shakira, Amy Schumer, and Odell Beckham Jr. The company then expanded into physical retail, launching in 1,300 Target stores that same month, followed by 300 Sprouts Farmers Market locations in September. By February 2023, Magic Spoon was available in 6,800 stores nationwide, including Walmart, Kroger, and Albertsons.

In April 2024, The Food Institute reported that Magic Spoon products had appeared in clearance bins at some Sprouts locations, raising questions about whether the brand's retail expansion had outpaced consumer demand.

As of September 2025, Magic Spoon's products were available in more than 22,000 retail stores, and the company described brick-and-mortar retail as its fastest-growing sales channel.

== Products ==
=== Breakfast cereal ===
Magic Spoon's cereals are made with a blend of casein and whey protein concentrate, providing 11 to 14 grams of protein per serving, and are sweetened with monk fruit and allulose. As of January 2025, the company offers six core flavors: Fruity, Frosted, Cocoa, Peanut Butter, Blueberry Muffin, and Cinnamon Toast. To expand their core cereal offerings, Magic Spoon launched protein + fiber cereals in 2025. The flavors consist of Fruity, Cocoa, Honey Nut, and Cinnamon Crunch, with each bowl offering 12-13 grams of protein per serving and 6 grams of prebiotic fiber. In January 2026, the company introduced cereals with marshmallows.

Magic Spoon advertises the amount of "net carbs" per serving by subtracting dietary fiber and allulose from total carbohydrates. However, the term "net carbs" is not defined by the Food and Drug Administration or the American Diabetes Association and has no standardized measurement method.

=== Other products ===
The company has expanded beyond cereal into other product categories. Its marshmallow treat bars contain 12 grams of protein and 9 grams of fiber per bar and are available in several flavors. Magic Spoon's protein treats come in 8 flavors: Marshmallow, Chocolate PB, Double Chocolate, S'mores, Blueberry Muffin, Salted Caramel, Birthday Cake, and Strawberry Milkshake. In January 2026, Magic Spoon introduced a line of toaster pastries in Frosted Strawberry, Cinnamon Brown Sugar, and S'Mores flavors.
