= Couple (app) =

Mobile messaging app

Couple, formerly Pair, was a mobile app that provided a mobile messaging service for two people, especially romantic couples. Like many mobile phone messaging applications, Couple allowed users to share text, photos, video, and other content. It was a competitor to apps like WhatsApp, Facebook Messenger, and KakaoTalk, but it was unique in that its purpose was for communicating with exactly one other person. Couple was one of a slew of mobile applications that intentionally confine their communication to a small group, as opposed to large public or semi-public networks like Twitter.

The app is no longer available on iPhone and Android. The free application garnered more than 100,000 users after only a week. TenthBit, the company producing Couple, is part of the Y Combinator startup incubator.

On February 2, 2013, TenthBit announced that it had acquired rival U.K. app Cupple and changed the name of the merged app from Pair to Couple.

On February 12, 2016, Couple was acquired by Life360.

Since April 22, 2019 (7 years ago), the app is defunct and the web interface returns Error 503.
