= Katalyst Media =

American film and television production company

Katalyst Network
- Type: Private
- Founded: 2000; 26 years ago
- Founders: Ashton Kutcher; Jason Goldberg
- Defunct: 2012
- Fate: Closed
- Headquarters: Los Angeles, California, US
- Products: Beauty and the Geek; Punk'd

Katalyst Network was a company founded by Ashton Kutcher and Jason Goldberg, based in Los Angeles, California. It was the company behind television series such as Beauty and the Geek and Punk'd.

== Founding history ==
The company was launched in 2000 by Ashton Kutcher and Jason Goldberg to develop television and film properties. In 2005, a social media division was added. The mission is to match storytelling with competitive distribution and technology platforms for some of the biggest brands in the world.

The company also founded a YouTube channel, Thrash Lab, to show unscripted content. The channel was partially funded by YouTube in 2012.
