= Ashton Kutcher =

American actor (born 1978)

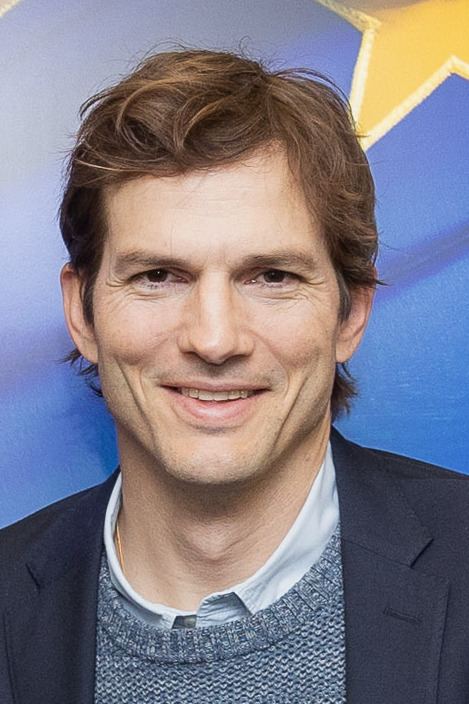
- Kutcher in 2023
- Born: Christopher Ashton Kutcher; February 7, 1978 (age 48); Cedar Rapids, Iowa, U.S.
- Occupations: Actor; film producer; businessman
- Years active: 1998–present
- Spouses: Demi Moore (m. 2005; div. 2013); Mila Kunis (m. 2015)
- Children: 2
- Awards: Full list

Christopher Ashton Kutcher (/ˈkʊtʃər/ KUUTCH-ər; born February 7, 1978) is an American actor, film producer and investor. His accolades include a People's Choice Award and fifteen Teen Choice Awards, in addition to a nomination for a Screen Actors Guild Award.

Kutcher began his acting career portraying Michael Kelso in the Fox sitcom That '70s Show (1998–2006). He made his film debut in the romantic comedy Coming Soon (1999), followed by the comedy film Dude, Where's My Car? (2000), which was a box office success. In 2003, Kutcher starred in the romantic comedies Just Married and My Boss's Daughter. That year, he created and produced the television series Punk'd, also serving as host for the first eight of its ten seasons. Kutcher starred in the science fiction film The Butterfly Effect (2004) and had a voice role in Open Season (2006).

Kutcher appeared in more romantic comedies, including Guess Who (2005), A Lot Like Love (2005), What Happens in Vegas (2008), and No Strings Attached (2011). From 2011 to 2015, he starred as Walden Schmidt on the CBS sitcom Two and a Half Men. In 2013, Kutcher portrayed Steve Jobs in the biographical film Jobs. He also led the Netflix sitcom The Ranch (2016–2020). He has since starred in the comedy thriller Vengeance (2022).

Beyond entertainment, Kutcher is also a venture capitalist. He is a co-founder of the venture capital firm A-Grade Investments. At SXSW in March 2015, Kutcher announced Sound Ventures, the successor to A-Grade Investments, managing a fund backed by institutional funding. Kutcher has also invested in several high technology startups.

== Early life and education ==
Kutcher was born on February 7, 1978, in Cedar Rapids, Iowa, to Diane (née Finnegan), a Procter & Gamble employee, and Larry M. Kutcher, a factory worker.

Kutcher was raised in a "relatively conservative" Catholic family. He has an older sister named Tausha and a fraternal twin brother named Michael, who had a heart transplant when the brothers were young children. Michael also has cerebral palsy and is a spokesperson for the advocacy organization Reaching for the Stars. Michael's cardiomyopathy caused Kutcher's home life to become increasingly stressful. He said he "didn't want to come home and find more bad news" about his brother, stating, "I kept myself so busy that I didn't allow myself to feel." Kutcher stated that, when he was 13, he contemplated committing suicide to save his brother's life with a heart transplant; when he told his father he was considering jumping from a Cedar Rapids hospital balcony, his father dissuaded him from doing so shortly before doctors announced that a transplant had become available from an accident victim in another state.

Kutcher attended Washington High School in Cedar Rapids for his freshman year, before his family moved to Homestead, Iowa, where he attended Clear Creek–Amana High School. During high school, he developed a passion for acting and appeared in school plays. During his senior year, he broke into his high school at midnight with his cousin in an attempt to steal money; he was arrested leaving the scene. Kutcher was convicted of third-degree burglary and sentenced to three years of probation and 180 hours of community service. Kutcher stated that although the experience "straightened him out", he lost his girlfriend and anticipated college scholarships, and was ostracized at school and in his community.

Kutcher enrolled at the University of Iowa in August 1996, where his planned major was biochemical engineering, motivated by the desire to cure his brother's heart ailment. At college, Kutcher was kicked out of his apartment for being too "noisy" and "wild". Kutcher stated, "I thought I knew everything but I didn't have a clue. I was partying, and I woke up many mornings not knowing what I had done the night before. I played way too hard. I am amazed I am not dead." To earn tuition money, Kutcher worked as a college summer hire in the cereal department for the General Mills plant in Cedar Rapids and sometimes sold his blood plasma. While at the University of Iowa, he was approached by a model scout at The Airliner bar in Iowa City, Iowa, and entered the "Fresh Faces of Iowa" modeling competition. Placing first, he won a trip to New York City's International Modeling and Talent Association (IMTA) Convention. Leaving Iowa for a stay in New York City, Kutcher then returned to Cedar Rapids, before relocating to Los Angeles to pursue a career in acting.

== Career ==
=== Modeling ===
After participating in an IMTA competition in 1998, Kutcher signed with Next modeling agency in New York, appeared in commercials for Calvin Klein, and modelled in Paris and Milan.

=== Acting ===
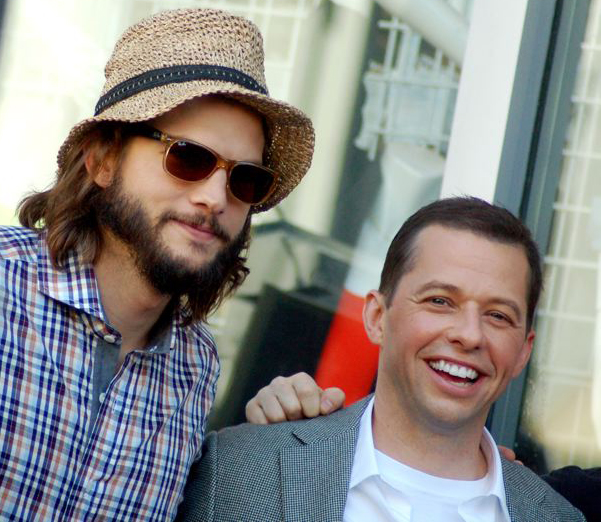
Kutcher (left) with Two and a Half Men co-star Jon Cryer in September 2011

Following his success in modeling, Kutcher moved to Los Angeles after his first audition. He was cast as Michael Kelso in the television series That '70s Show and played that part from 1998 to 2006. Kutcher was cast in a series of film roles; although he auditioned but was not cast for the role of Danny Walker in Pearl Harbor (2001) (replaced by Josh Hartnett), he starred in several comedy films, including Dude, Where's My Car? (2000), Just Married (2003), and Guess Who (2005). He appeared in the 2003 family film Cheaper by the Dozen as a self-obsessed actor. In the 2004 drama film The Butterfly Effect, Kutcher played a conflicted young man who time travels. While the film received negative reviews, it was a box office success.

In 2003, Kutcher produced and starred as the host in his own series, MTV's Punk'd, that involved hidden camera tricks performed on celebrities. He is also an executive producer of the reality television shows Beauty and the Geek, Adventures in Hollyhood (based around the rap group Three 6 Mafia), The Real Wedding Crashers, and the game show Opportunity Knocks. Many of his production credits, including Punk'd, come through Katalyst Films, a production company he runs with partner Jason Goldberg. A 2004 interviewer described Kutcher as a "hunky young actor [who] is heading in all different directions at once", including to "the hot L.A. restaurant Dolce":

"If anything, I'm a trier", says Kutcher between puffs of filtered Lucky Strikes. "I think, more than anything, it comes from the fact that my father always had several irons in the fire. Also, I don't want to fail. If something doesn't work out—if That '70s Show got canceled or if I wasn't going to have a film career—I always wanted to have backup contingency plans. So I just started doing other things; and on a half-hour sitcom, you're really only working for 30 hours a week. It allows a lot of time for sitting around, which I always kind of filled with work.

Because of scheduling conflicts with the filming of The Guardian, Kutcher was unable to renew his contract for the eighth and final season of That '70s Show, although he appeared in its first four episodes (credited as a special guest star) and returned for the series finale. Kutcher produced and starred in the 2010 action comedy, Killers, in which he played a hitman. In May 2011, Kutcher was announced as Charlie Sheen's replacement on the series Two and a Half Men.

Kutcher's contract was for one year and was believed to be worth nearly $20 million. His debut as the character Walden Schmidt, entitled "Nice to Meet You, Walden Schmidt", was seen by 28.7 million people on September 19, 2011. The Nielsen ratings company reported that figure was larger than any episode in the show's first eight seasons with Sheen. Kutcher earned $750,000 an episode on the show. The show ended with a forty-minute series finale "Of Course He's Dead" on February 19, 2015.

Kutcher appeared in a Popchips ad campaign in May 2012. The campaign featured Kutcher as an Indian man named Raj who was "looking for love" in a dating ad-style spoof. Kutcher's use of brown face paint and a stereotypical Indian accent received criticism from online viewers and members of the Indian-American community.

Kutcher appeared as a guest Shark during the seventh season of reality TV show Shark Tank, which premiered on September 25, 2015.

In 2016, he appeared in the "Candy, Quahog Marshmallow" episode of Family Guy. From 2016 to 2020, Kutcher co-starred in the Netflix series The Ranch alongside Danny Masterson, Elisha Cuthbert and Debra Winger, and played the role of Colt Bennett, the son of a Colorado rancher (Sam Elliott), who returned home from a semi-pro football career to run the family-ranch business. On April 30, 2022, it was announced that Kutcher had a guest appearance in the follow-up sitcom, That '90s Show.

=== Venture capital ===
Beyond the entertainment world, Kutcher invested in several high-technology startups. Kutcher invested in six startups as of August 2017: Neighborly, Zenreach, ResearchGate, Duolingo, Kopari Beauty, and most recently, Lemonade.

He was a co-founder of the venture capital firm A-Grade Investments with Guy Oseary, Ron Burkle and fund manager Chris Hollod. Kutcher, Oseary, and Burkle started by initially investing $30 million of their own funds in 2010 when they founded the firm. By 2016, Forbes valued the firms holdings at $236 million. At SXSW, on March 14, 2015, Kutcher announced a new business, called Sound Ventures, a successor to A-Grade Investments, to manage a fund backed by institutional funding.

On October 29, 2013, Lenovo announced that it hired Kutcher as a product engineer. Kutcher was part of the management team for Ooma, a tech start-up launched in September 2007. Ooma was in the Voice over Internet Protocol business and Kutcher's role was Creative Director. He spearheaded a marketing campaign and produced viral videos to promote this service. Ooma revamped its sales and marketing strategy with a new management team in the summer of 2008, and replaced Kutcher with a new creative director. Rich Buchanan, from Sling Media, became Ooma's Chief Marketing Officer.

Kutcher also created an interactive arm of Katalyst called Katalyst Media, with his partner from Katalyst Films, Jason Goldberg. Their first site was the animated cartoon Blah Girls.

Kutcher invested in an Italian restaurant called Dolce (other owners included Danny Masterson and Wilmer Valderrama), and a Japanese-themed restaurant named Geisha House with locations in Atlanta, Los Angeles, and New York City. Geisha House went out of business on June 1, 2013.

In 2019, Ashton Kutcher, Mark Cuban, Steve Watts, and Watts's wife, Angela, invested a 50% stake in Veldskoen Shoes, a fledgling U.S. business.

In 2021, Kutcher invested in MeaTech, an Israeli company that developed meat with 3D printing. During 2026, he announced his departure from Sound to start a new venture firm with former NFX general partner Morgan Beller.

=== Other work ===
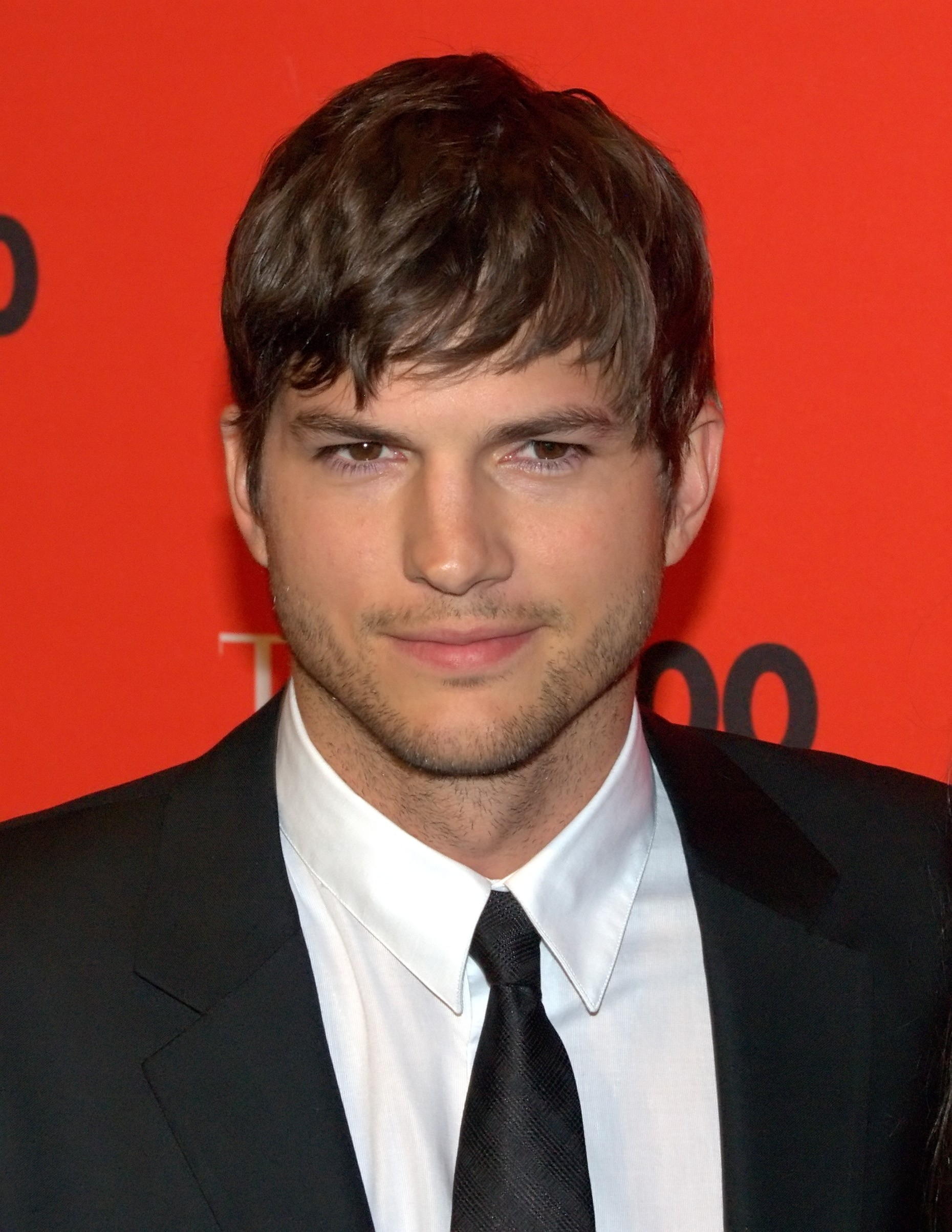
Kutcher in 2010

In 2009, Kutcher established an international human rights organization with his then-wife Demi Moore. DNA Foundation, later known as Thorn: Digital Defenders of Children, worked on a global scale to address the sexual exploitation of children and the proliferation of child pornography.

On March 23, 2011, Kutcher launched his own Twitter client with UberMedia called A.plus. While the app was initially available exclusively for desktop computers with Adobe Air installed, it eventually became available on mobile platforms iPhone, Android, and BlackBerry. To download one of the three mobile platforms, users were compelled to install the UberSocial application on their device and then download A.plus on their browser.

In 2013, Kutcher, Evan Beard, and Kendall Dabaghi launched A Plus; Kutcher served as the chairman of the board. Initially a product discovery service, it morphed, in April 2014, into a social media-driven content platform focused on upbeat stories. It officially launched in that incarnation in January 2015. It reported 27.5 million monthly unique visitors in the United States, had an Alexa rank of about 11,787 (4,019 in the U.S.), and was ranked by Quantcast as a top-50 site in the U.S.

In 2016, while speaking at an Airbnb event in Los Angeles, Kutcher was assailed onstage by a protestor who criticized the company for allowing Israeli settlers to list their homes in the illegally-occupied West Bank on its website. Kutcher was an early investor in the company. In 2018, Kutcher attended the Western Region gala of Friends of the Israel Defense Forces, which raised over $60 million for Israel Defense Forces (IDF) soldiers.

In 2022, Kutcher and his wife Mila Kunis, a native of Ukraine, started a gofundme page to help two online companies, Airbnb and Flexport, to aid refugees from Ukraine, who fled violence perpetrated by Russia's military. They raised $34 million as of March 2022. These two organizations were on the ground to help people in Poland and Romania. The couple promised to match the funding.

== Personal life ==
=== Marriages and relationships ===
In February 2001, Ashley Ellerin, whom Ashton Kutcher was dating at the time, was murdered. While never a suspect, Kutcher testified at the 2019 trial of serial killer Michael Gargiulo. Kutcher stated that on the night that Ellerin was murdered, Kutcher had arrived to pick her up for a date, but that she had not answered the door. His information helped establish the time of death. Gargiulo was found guilty and sentenced to death on July 16, 2021, for her murder.

In late 2002, he began dating Brittany Murphy, his co-star in Just Married.

Kutcher and Demi Moore met in 2003 and married on September 24, 2005. Six years later, on November 17, 2011, Moore announced her intention to end the marriage. After more than a year of separation, Kutcher filed for divorce from Moore on December 21, 2012, in Los Angeles Superior Court, citing irreconcilable differences. The divorce was finalized on November 26, 2013.

Kutcher began dating his former That '70s Show co-star Mila Kunis during the first half of 2012. After they became engaged in February 2014, she gave birth to a daughter in October 2014. Kunis married Kutcher in July 2015. She gave birth to a son in November 2016. The family resides in a sustainable farmhouse, designed by the couple and architect Howard Backen, in Beverly Hills.

=== Interests and beliefs ===
In 2009, Kutcher described himself as a fiscal conservative and a social liberal. He is a gun owner but supports new gun laws to help stop mass shootings. Following the 2017 mass shooting in Las Vegas, he said on Twitter, "I've had a gun since I was 12 yrs old but enough is enough. I'm a hunter and a sportsman but nobody needs assault rifles. Let's pray. Then let's change the law."

On September 17, 2008, Kutcher was named the assistant coach for the freshman football team at Harvard-Westlake School in Los Angeles. However, he was unable to return in 2009 because he was filming Spread.

Kutcher is also a long-time practitioner of Brazilian jiu-jitsu and he was promoted to black belt in the martial art by Rigan Machado in 2025.

Kutcher grew up as a Catholic. As an adult, he practices Kabbalah, and has visited Israel and studied the Torah; his wife Mila Kunis stated that he "taught [me] everything I never knew" about her religion, Judaism, though as of 2018, he has not converted. On trips to Israel, Kutcher visited Kabbalah centers in Tel Aviv and in Tsfat. In 2013, Kutcher remarked, "Israel is near and dear to my heart ... coming to Israel is sort of coming back to the source of creation—trying to get closer to that. And as a creative person, going to the source of creation is really inspiring. And this place has been really inspiring for me—not only on a spiritual level, but also on an artistic and creative level."

=== Social media presence ===
On April 16, 2009, Kutcher became the first Twitter user to reach more than one million followers, beating CNN in the site's "Million followers contest". In November 2011, Kutcher received heavy criticism for his tweet in response to the Jerry Sandusky child sexual abuse scandal, calling the firing of Penn State football coach Joe Paterno "in poor taste". Kutcher subsequently turned over management of his Twitter account to his team at the Katalyst Media company.

In April 2011, Kutcher and then-wife Demi Moore began a public service announcement campaign to end child sex trafficking. Kutcher claimed that 100,000 to 300,000 American children were sold into sexual slavery. The number was criticized by newspaper The Village Voice. Kutcher and others including The New York Times, C-SPAN, and CNN used a peer-reviewed study, which referred to minors at risk for sexual exploitation. The Village Voice, from their research, said it was only hundreds of children. Kutcher claimed the criticism by the Village Voice promoted child prostitution and used Twitter to request that Village Voice advertisers withdraw their advertising from publications owned by its parent company.

=== Health ===
In August 2022, Kutcher revealed that two years earlier he had been diagnosed with vasculitis, which had impaired his hearing, vision, and mobility during the course of a year.

=== Danny Masterson trial ===
After the conviction of That '70s Show and The Ranch castmate, Danny Masterson, for rape, Kutcher, along with Mila Kunis, wrote letters to the judge in support of Masterson. The letters stated that Masterson was a good person and that he treated people with "decency, equality, and generosity". After the letters were made public, Kutcher and Kunis received immediate backlash and criticism for their support of Masterson, especially due to Kutcher's and Kunis's involvement in Thorn, a charity to expose the sexual exploitation of children. After the backlash, Kutcher and Kunis apologized in a video, in which the two claimed that the letters were only intended for the judge and not for the public. The apology was similarly criticized as "performative and insincere". In response to the further backlash, Kutcher stepped down as chairman of the board of Thorn.

== Filmography ==
Key
†	Denotes works that have not yet been released

Film
Year	Title	Role	Notes
1999	Coming Soon	Louie	
2000	Down to You	Jim Morrison	
2000	Reindeer Games	College Kid	
2000	Dude, Where's My Car?	Jesse Montgomery III	
2001	Texas Rangers	George Durham	
2003	Just Married	Tom Leezak	
2003	My Boss's Daughter	Tom Stansfield	
2003	Cheaper by the Dozen	Hank	Uncredited
2004	The Butterfly Effect	Evan Treborn	
2005	Guess Who	Simon Green	
2005	A Lot like Love	Oliver Martin	
2006	Bobby	Fisher	
2006	The Guardian	Jake Fischer	
2006	Open Season	Elliot (voice)	
2008	What Happens in Vegas	Jack Fuller	
2009	Spread	Nikki	
2009	Personal Effects	Walter	
2010	Brother's Justice	Himself	
2010	Valentine's Day	Reed Bennet	
2010	Killers	Spencer Aimes	
2011	No Strings Attached	Adam Franklin	
2011	New Year's Eve	Randy	Segment: "Elevator Story"
2013	Jobs	Steve Jobs	
2014	Annie	Simon Goodspeed	Cameo
2014	The Man Who Saved the World	Himself	Documentary
2022	Vengeance	Quinten Sellers	
2023	Your Place or Mine	Peter Coleman	
TBA	The Long Home †	Nathan Winer Sr.	Post-production
TBA	The Decline of Fucking Western Civilization †	TBA	Post-production

Television
Year	Title	Role	Notes
1998–2006	That '70s Show	Michael Kelso	Main role (seasons 1–7); recurring (season 8)
2001	Just Shoot Me	Dean Cassidy	Episode: "Mayas and Tigers and Deans, Oh My"
2002	Grounded for Life	Cousin Scott	Episode: "Dust in the Wind"
2003–2007; 2012	Punk'd	Himself	Creator, host, producer
2005	Robot Chicken	Michael Kelso; Michael Knight; Templeton 'Faceman' Peck; TiVo Addict (voices)	3 episodes
2008	Miss Guided	Beaux	Episode: "Hot Sub"
2011–2015	Two and a Half Men	Walden Schmidt	Lead role (seasons 9–12)
2013	Men at Work	Eric	Episode: "Long Distance Tyler", uncredited
2016	Family Guy	Himself	Episode: "Candy, Quahog Marshmallow"
2016–2020	The Ranch	Colt Bennett	Main role
2017	The Bachelorette	Himself	Episode: "Season 13, 139 overall"
2022	The Boys	Himself	Episode: "Herogasm"; cameo
2023	That '90s Show	Michael Kelso	Episode: "That '90s Pilot"
2026	The Beauty	Byron Forst / the Corporation	Main role

Producer
Year	Title	Role	Notes
2003–2007; 2012	Punk'd	Executive producer	
2003	My Boss's Daughter	Co-producer	
2004	The Butterfly Effect	Executive producer	
2004	You've Got a Friend	Executive producer	8 episodes
2005–2008	Beauty and the Geek	Executive producer	
2007	Adventures in Hollyhood	Executive producer	8 episodes
2007	Miss Guided	Executive producer	7 episodes
2007	Game Show in My Head	Executive producer	8 episodes
2007	The Real Wedding Crashers	Executive producer	7 episodes
2007	Room 401	Executive producer	8 episodes
2008	Pop Fiction	Executive producer	1 episode
2008–2009	Opportunity Knocks	Executive producer	
2009	True Beauty	Executive producer	4 episodes
2009	The Beautiful Life	Executive producer	
2009	Spread		
2010	Killers	Executive producer	
2012–2013	Rituals	Executive producer	3 episodes
2013	Forever Young	Executive producer	

== Awards and nominations ==
Since he started acting, Kutcher was nominated the most times by the Teen Choice Awards. He also won awards for his romantic comedies A Lot like Love, What Happens in Vegas, and No Strings Attached. In 1999, he was nominated by the Young Artist Award for Best Performance in a TV Series by a Supporting Young Actor as Michael Kelso in That '70s Show. He was also nominated by the Screen Actors Guild Award, Kid's Choice Awards, MTV Movie Awards, People's Choice Awards, and the Golden Raspberry Awards.
