= Jason Goldberg =

American film and television producer (born 1972)

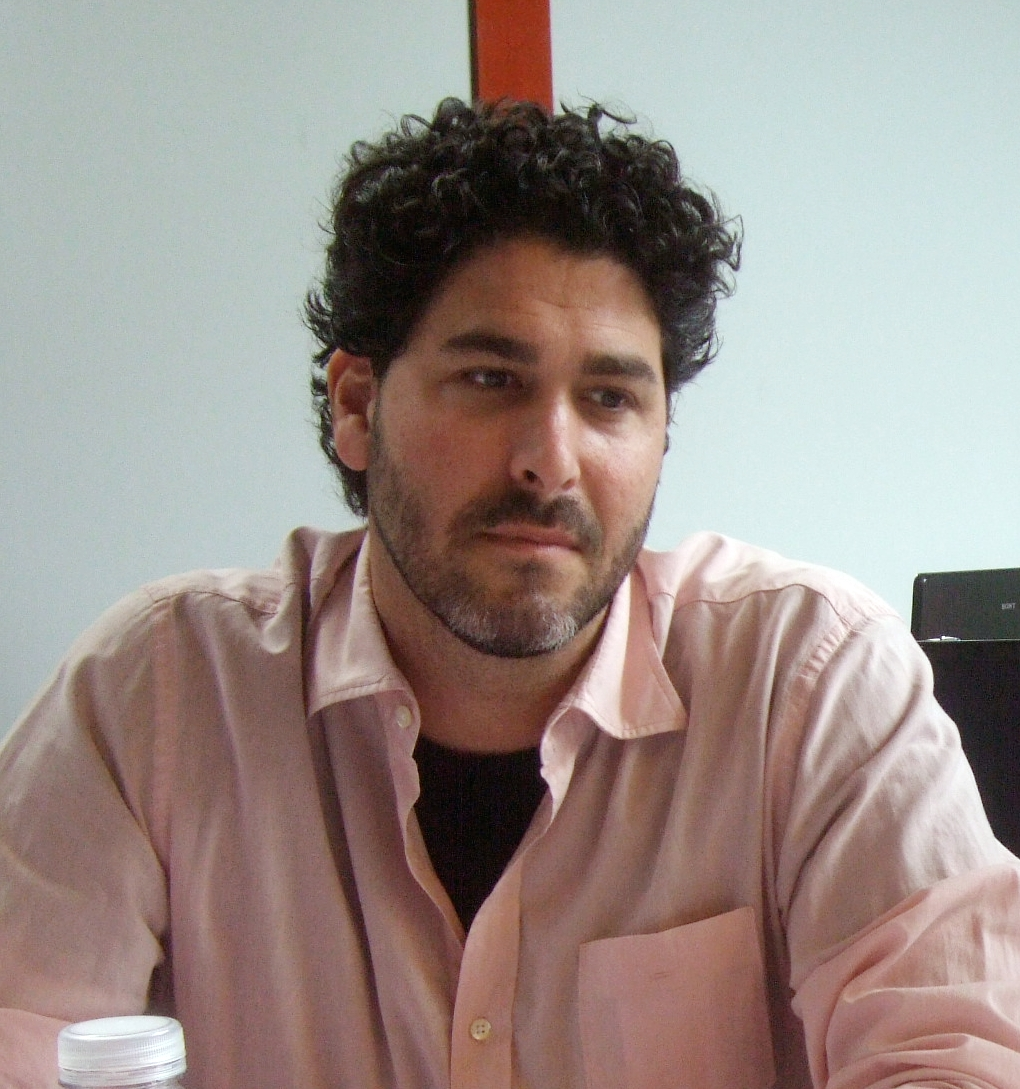
- Goldberg in 2008
- Born: 1972 (age 53–54); Bel Air, Los Angeles, California, US
- Occupations: Film and television producer
- Years active: 1995–present
- Spouse: Soleil Moon Frye (m. 1998; div. 2022)
- Children: 4

Jason Goldberg (born 1972) is an American film and television producer. Goldberg is the producer of the films Guess Who and The Butterfly Effect and executive producer of the shows Beauty and the Geek and Punk'd. He often works with Ashton Kutcher.

== Early life, family and education ==
Jason Goldberg was born in Bel Air, Los Angeles, California.

== Career ==
Goldberg began working as a producer in 1994 on the Blythe Danner film Homage. Next, he produced Cafe Society with Lara Flynn Boyle and Peter Gallagher. He and Ashton Kutcher run a production company, Katalyst Films.

He has been on the board of directors for Environmental Media Association (EMA), an environmental action group based in Los Angeles.

== Personal life ==
Goldberg married actress Soleil Moon Frye (best known as the child actress who portrayed the title character on the 1980s TV sitcom Punky Brewster) on October 25, 1998. They wed in a traditional Jewish ceremony in Los Angeles. They had met in 1996 when as a film student at The New School she "pitched him a movie script." Their first child, daughter Poet Sienna Rose Goldberg, was born on August 24, 2005. Their second child, daughter Jagger Joseph Blue Goldberg, was born on March 17, 2008. Their third child, son Lyric Sonny Roads Goldberg, was born February 9, 2014. Their fourth child, son Story Goldberg, was born May 16, 2016.

Goldberg and Moon-Frye renewed their marriage vows in a ceremony in 2008. However, in 2020, after 22 years of marriage, the couple separated. The divorce was finalized in 2022.
