= Exo Inc. =

Exo is an American insect food company that manufactures protein bars using cricket flour from pulverized house crickets. The products are marketed as a good source of nutrition.

== History ==
The company was founded by Gabi Lewis and Greg Sewitz in 2013, during their graduate program at the Brown University campus. They first ordered 2000 crickets and worked on some of the prototype recipes from them. They later shifted to New York and worked with Kyle Connaughton, an R&D expert at the Fat Duck restaurant, to make a nutritious protein bar that was also appealing to the palate.

Using Kickstarter, the company's founders raised $55,000 in early 2016, exceeding the initial target of $20,000.

By March 2016, the company had raised a total of $5.6 million from early investors and Series A funding.

Exo was acquired by Aspire Food Group in the spring of 2018. All of Aspire's in-house Aketta branded products will now become part of the Exo brand.
