= Punk'd =

American hidden-camera reality show

- 2003 title card
- Created by: Ashton Kutcher; Jason Goldberg
- Starring: Ashton Kutcher (2003–2007) Celebrity guest hosts (2012); King Bach and DeStorm Power (2015); Aditi Garg (2015); Chance the Rapper (2020–2021)
- Theme music composer: Elizabeth Miller: Brian Friedman (Theme); Ricky Friedman (Theme)
- Country of origin: United States
- Original language: English
- No. of seasons: 11
- No. of episodes: 94 (list of episodes)

Production
- Executive producers: Jason Goldberg; Ashton Kutcher (2003–2012); David R. Franzke; Billy Rainey; Lois Clark Curren; Rod Aissa
- Running time: 22 minutes (2003–2007; 2012; 2015); 5–7 minutes (2020–2021)
- Production companies: Katalyst Media (2003–2007 & 2012); STX Television (2015, 2020–2021); MTV Entertainment Studios (2020–2021)

Original release
- Network: MTV
- Release: March 17, 2003 – May 29, 2007
- Release: March 29 – June 7, 2012
- Network: BET
- Release: August 18 – October 6, 2015
- Network: Quibi (2020); The Roku Channel (2021)
- Release: April 6, 2020 – December 10, 2021

Punk'd is an American hidden camera–practical joke reality television series that first aired on MTV in 2003. It was created by Ashton Kutcher and Jason Goldberg, with Kutcher serving as producer and host. It bears a resemblance to both the classic hidden camera show Candid Camera and to TV's Bloopers & Practical Jokes, which also featured pranks on celebrities. Being "punk'd" referred to being the victim of such a prank. New episodes hosted by King Bach and DeStorm Power aired on BET.

A reboot of the series hosted by Chance the Rapper premiered on Quibi in 2020 and moved to The Roku Channel until its cancellation in December 2021.

== History and format ==
Originally, Ashton Kutcher and MTV were developing a program called Harassment, a hidden camera show which would feature pranks on regular everyday anonymous people. However, a January 2002 prank involving a fake dead body at the Hard Rock Hotel in Las Vegas backfired and the couple who were targets of the prank sued Kutcher, MTV, and the hotel for $10 million. The concept was later retooled to involve celebrities instead. Pranks would be set at a variety of locations, public and private. One of the show's first pranks was set at singer Justin Timberlake's home, where he was led to believe that government agents were seizing his home and valuables because of unpaid income taxes. Time magazine ranked the prank #3 on its list of 32 Epic Moments in Reality-TV History. Another (the very first) involved Frankie Muniz's special custom-made limited edition Porsche being stolen.

A frequent segment during the first two seasons was a Punk'd cast member pretending to interview celebrities at red carpet events, only to mock them instead. This segment closely copies what originated on The Howard Stern Show in the 1980s, when Stern and his writers began sending interns (most notably Stuttering John Melendez) to ask celebrities embarrassing questions on the red carpet. During the first season then-fifteen-year-old Ryan Pinkston posed as a reporter from a children's television program, and would insult the celebrities. During season two, the producers then chose a foreign interviewer accompanied by her interpreter who would then ask inane questions to the guests. Several actors, like Jill Wagner, Masi Oka, B. J. Novak, Caitlyn Taylor Love, Dax Shepard, and a then-unknown Bill Hader were accomplices in the pranks. But when the next celebrity targets who saw the show would recognize the members of Punk'd and realized what was happening to them, the show would get new field agents every season.

The series finale aired on MTV on May 29, 2007, and culminated in early June with the Punk'd Awards.

=== Revival ===
In October 2010, New York Magazine revealed that Punk'd was being revived with Justin Bieber replacing Kutcher as the host; however, it stated that Kutcher would remain as executive producer. After a five-year hiatus, the program was revived with a March 2012 premiere. The first episode of the ninth season, featuring Bieber as a guest host, was filmed in late August 2011. On December 31, 2011, MTV confirmed that the program would be revived in 2012, and that a different celebrity guest host would be featured each episode, the guests included: Tyler, the Creator, Justin Bieber, Bam Margera, Hayden Panettiere, Lucy Hale, Nick Cannon, Dax Shepard, Ashley Tisdale, Demi Lovato, Miley Cyrus, Heather Morris, Kellan Lutz, Daniel Tosh, and Mac Miller. Ashton Kutcher made a returning appearance on an episode where he got to punk again.

The ninth season ended on June 7, 2012.

=== BET reboot ===
On May 25, 2013, Katalyst Media stated that a tenth season was in development. At their 2015 upfronts, BET announced that they would be rebooting the program for their network. Although Katalyst had closed by then Goldberg returned as executive producer with a revival of the Katalyst banner without Kutcher. Ryan Good also executive produced. The reboot is tailored for the network's audience and goes behind the scenes of many pranks. The reboot premiered on August 18, 2015.

To promote the program, BET announced the return of BET: Uncut, a block for uncut music videos, on August 11, 2015. In reality, after a revelation and introduction from new hosts, King Bach and DeStorm Power, BET aired highlights from past segments of the program as well as previews for their program.

=== Quibi reboot ===
In 2020, it was announced that a new Punk'd reboot would air on the mobile video platform Quibi hosted by Chance the Rapper. After Quibi was shut down in December 2020, on January 8, 2021, Roku bought the rights to Quibi's content library, including Punk'd for seven years. Season 2 premiered on The Roku Channel on December 10, 2021.

== Syndication ==
Punk'd began in off-network syndication in 2008 and in the fall of that year, Trifecta Entertainment & Media put it into barter syndication and aired on affiliates of Fox, MyNetworkTV, The CW, and Independent stations. However, as of fall 2012, the show has left local syndication along with The Hills and Laguna Beach due to lack of ratings.

As of 2026, the show reruns on Sinclair Broadcast Group's digital multicast network, Roar. It can also be streamed for free on Pluto TV.

== See also ==
- Candid Camera
- List of practical joke topics
