= Ronald Burkle =

American businessman (born 1952)

- Born: Ronald Wayne Burkle; November 12, 1952 (age 73); Pomona, California, U.S.
- Education: California State Polytechnic University, Pomona
- Occupation: Businessman
- Years active: 1986–present
- Title: Co-founder and managing partner, The Yucaipa Companies, LLC
- Spouse: Janet Steeper (m. 1974–2006)
- Children: 3
- Website: Burkle Foundation

Ronald Wayne Burkle (born November 12, 1952) is an American businessman. He is the co-founder and managing partner of The Yucaipa Companies, LLC, a private investment firm that specializes in U.S. companies in the distribution, logistics, food, retail, consumer, hospitality, entertainment, sports and light industrial sectors.

Yucaipa has executed grocery-chain mergers and acquisitions involving supermarket chains including Fred Meyer, Ralphs and Jurgensen's and once owned stakes in about 35 companies, including the grocery chains A&P and Whole Foods Market before their respective demise and takeover.

Burkle's net worth was estimated at US$3.9 billion in March 2026, and ranked 1,072nd globally.

Burkle is an activist and fundraiser for the Democratic Party.

== Early life ==
Ron Burkle was born on November 12, 1952, the elder of two sons, to Betty and Joseph Burkle in Pomona, California. Joseph worked seven days a week, managing a Stater Bros. grocery store in Pomona and investing his savings in apartment buildings. To see his father, Burkle stocked shelves in his father's store with bread and corralled shopping carts.

By age 13, Burkle had joined United Food and Commercial Workers Union Local 770. At age 16, he graduated from high school and entered California State Polytechnic University, Pomona to study dentistry. Less than two years later, Burkle dropped out.

At age 21, he married Janet Steeper, a Stater Bros. clerk and great-grandniece of the aviation pioneers, the Wright brothers. They had three children together. Burkle parlayed a $3,000 investment in American Silver and another metals company into $30,000 and began investing in and flipping undervalued grocery stores. He made at least one deal with the assistance of junk bond financier Michael Milken.

Burkle was promoted to store manager at Stater Bros. and later became a vice president at Petrolane, Inc., Stater's parent company. When he was 29, Petrolane decided to sell Stater Bros. Burkle secretly organized a leveraged buyout with Charles Munger, vice-chairman of Berkshire Hathaway, who agreed to put up half of the equity. Burkle made his bid to Petrolane's board that was 20% lower than Petrolane's internal valuation. The board rejected Burkle's offer and fired him. Burkle's portfolio was by then worth some $5 million, and during the next five years, he continued to invest in stocks and oversaw his family's rental properties.

== Career ==
In 1986, Burkle founded Yucaipa Companies, a private equity firm which invests in U.S. companies in the hospitality, sports, entertainment, logistics, food, consumer, light industrial, retail, manufacturing, and distribution.

During the 1992 Los Angeles riots, Burkle refused to close his inner-city stores, a move for which he received praise.

He has been chairman of the board and controlling shareholder of numerous companies, including Alliance Entertainment, Golden State Foods, Dominick's, Fred Meyer, Ralphs, and Food4Less. He has been a corporate board member of the boards of Occidental Petroleum Corporation, KB Home, and Yahoo!

Burkle is often seen as a businessman who maintains close relationships with labor unions and works with unions to solve business problems.

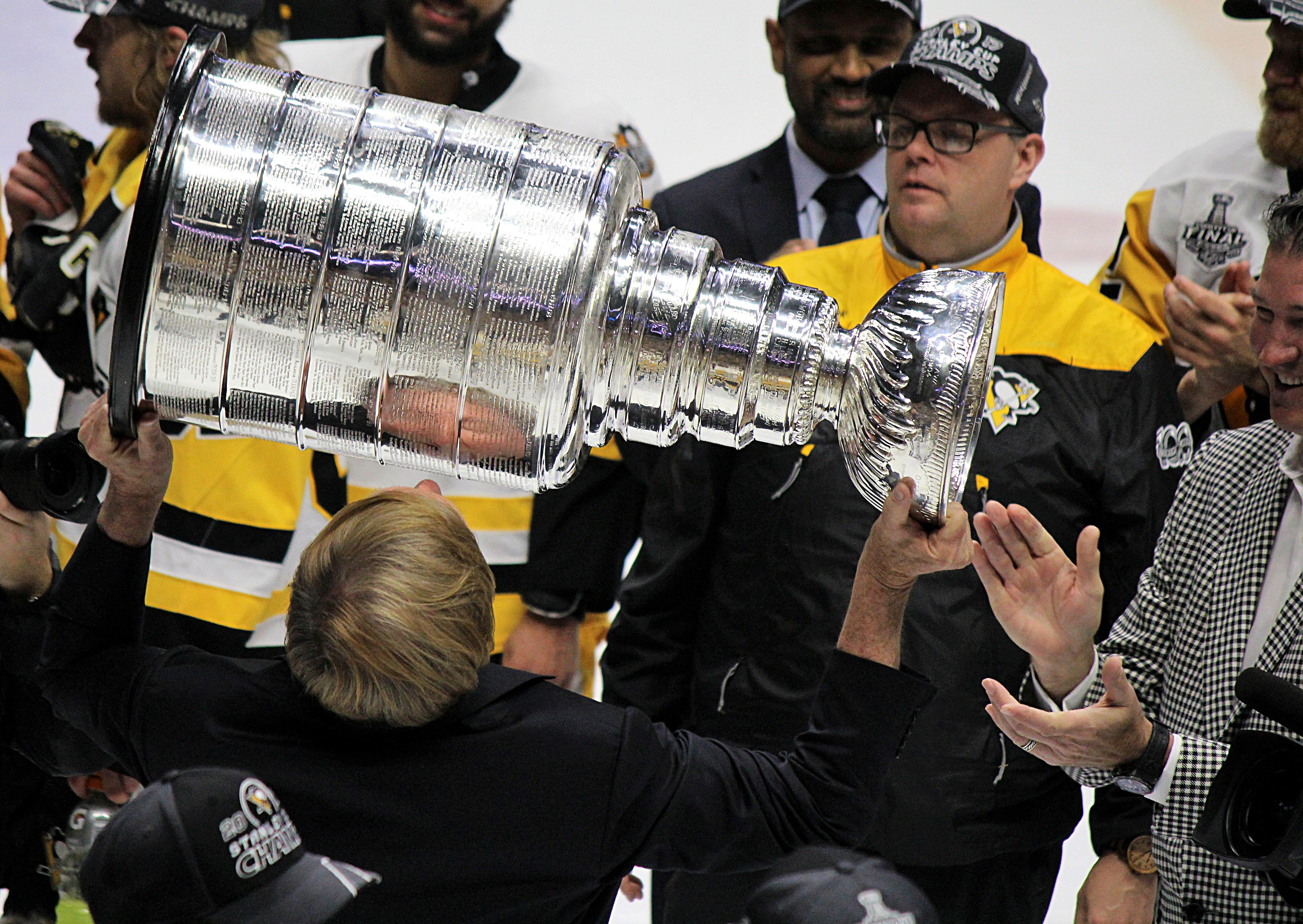
Co-owner Mario Lemieux looks on as Burkle kisses the Stanley Cup in 2017.

=== NHL ===
Burkle is part owner of the Pittsburgh Penguins of the National Hockey League, although his stake in the team is unknown. In 1999, he helped save the team by partnering with former Penguin Mario Lemieux to bring the team out of bankruptcy.

Burkle played an active part in negotiations to construct the PPG Paints Arena for the Penguins.

Burkle's strong ties to union work also led him to be one of the owners helping Commissioner Gary Bettman negotiate an end to the 2012–13 NHL lockout.

The Penguins, under the ownership of Burkle, are the only North American sports team with ties to private equity that has won a championship.

=== MLS ===
On January 22, 2019, Burkle was announced as the new lead investor of Sacramento Republic FC.

On February 26, 2021, Burkle announced that he was pulling out his interests in Major League Soccer expansion club in Sacramento due to the COVID-19 pandemic in California. This move placed Sacramento expansion hopes in doubt.

=== NWSL ===
In January 2021, Lisa Baird, the commissioner of the National Women's Soccer League (NWSL), announced that an expansion team in Sacramento, led by Ron Burkle and in conjunction with Sacramento Republic FC's expansion bid into Major League Soccer, would join the NWSL in 2022. However, Burkle never confirmed the news publicly before exiting the Sacramento Republic's ownership group. Instead, on June 8, 2021, the NWSL announced San Diego as the location for an expansion team owned by Burkle, which began play as San Diego Wave FC in the 2022 NWSL season.

=== Technology investments ===
Burkle has invested in technology startup companies through A-Grade Investments, a venture capital fund he founded with Ashton Kutcher and Guy Oseary. As of 2020, A-Grade's investment portfolio included SeatGeek, SoundCloud, Uber, Warby Parker, Spotify, Foursquare, and Airbnb.

He has also invested in technology startup companies through Inevitable Venture, a venture capital fund founded by D. A. Wallach and Chris Hollod. Inevitable Ventures's investment include Picnic Health, 8i, Thrive Market, and Wiser Care.

=== Media investments ===
In January 2012, Burkle invested in Artist Group International, a concert-booking firm whose clients include Billy Joel, Metallica, and Rod Stewart. In March 2013, Burkle invested in a branded entertainment company, Three Lions Entertainment, which focuses on branded entertainment events and cross platform marketing. In 2014, he bought Artist Group International and, through the Paradigm Talent Agency, partnered with London's CODA Music Agency and X-ray Touring. That same year, Burkle acquired a minority stake in Independent Talent through Yucaipa fund.

Ron Burkle was a close friend and business partner of Harvey Weinstein, with whom he produced several films. Burkle financed the Weinstein brothers' attempt to take over Miramax in 2010. In 2018, Burkle attempted an unsuccessful takeover the bankrupt Weinstein Company as part of an investor consortium.

In 2018, Burkle's investment firm Yucaipa acquired a minority stake in the Spanish music festival Primavera Sound.

In 2020, Burkle made a major investment in the musical festival production Danny Wimmer Presents.

On April 5, 2023, it was announced that Burkle along with Anthony Kiedis and Bob Forrest had formed the production company Said and Done Entertainment. Their first project will be an animated series for TBS called Hellicious which is based on the comic book of the same name. Burkle, Kiedis and Forrest will also serve as executive producers on the series.

Burkle is an Executive Producer with Taylor Sheridan on the hit streaming show "Landman."

=== Other investments ===
Wild Oats Markets was an operator of natural foods stores and farmers' markets in North America. Burkle started buying Wild Oats stock in February 2005. By the time Whole Foods Market, a natural-foods grocer, agreed to pay $565 million for Wild Oats, Burkle was the largest shareholder of Wild Oats.

Burkle sold his majority stake in supplier Golden State Foods to St. Louis-based Wetterau Associates for about $110 million. Golden State, one of McDonald's biggest suppliers, operates 11 distribution centers in the United States and abroad and two U.S. processing plants.

In 2014, Burkle acquired Soho House, a chain of hotels and private members’ clubs.

In 2019, Burkle sold a 50% stake in the Sydell Group to MGM Resorts International. He maintains ownership stakes in a number of other hotel properties.

Burkle's investments and transactions include:

- Sold Dominick's chain to Safeway in 1998 for over $200 million in profit;
- Owns 26% stake in Americold Realty Trust;
- Leveraged buyouts of Jurgensen's, Fred Meyer, Food 4 Less, and Ralphs supermarket chains, and sold to Kroger for $13.5 billion;
- Signed Fleming Companies, Inc. as sole food supplier to Kmart;
- Majority stake in Pathmark grocery stores;
- Cyrk, the former Beanie Baby promotion agency;
- Merged Alliance Entertainment with Source Interlink;
- 49% of British jewelry brand Stephen Webster purchased in 2007;
- Invested $100 million in Sean Combs's (P. Diddy) Sean John clothing line in 2003;
- Purchased Enthusiast Media publications and assets of Primedia for $1.2 billion;
- Burkle's investment firm, Yucaipa Cos., owns 18.7% of the common stock of Barnes & Noble. In early 2010 he sought to raise his stake to 37% without triggering the shareholders' rights plan. B&N Chairman Len Riggio, with 27.8% ownership of the bookseller's common stock, is Barnes & Noble's largest shareholder.
- Burkle offered to purchase the financially troubled Sacramento Kings franchise and prevent the team from relocating to Anaheim; however, a conflict of interest as a part-owner of Relativity Sports forced him to drop out.
- Debt holdings of Relativity Media, an independent studio company. As part of the deal, Burkle joined the board of directors of the company.
- Burkle provided Amalgamated Bank with a $100 million loan in 2011, taking a combined 41% stake in Amalgamated along with Wilbur Ross.

== Political activities ==
Burkle has personally contributed millions of dollars to the Democratic Party and raised an estimated $100 million at celebrity-studded fundraising events he hosted for Democratic Party candidates at his Green Acres Estate in Beverly Hills, California. Burkle has hosted fundraisers for Bill and Hillary Clinton, John Kerry, Cory Booker, and Terry McAuliffe, as well as former Republican California Governor Arnold Schwarzenegger, among others.

In January 2011, he hosted a fundraiser to support efforts to overturn Proposition 8, California's ban on same-sex marriage.

In 2004, Burkle helped finance the launch of Al Gore's Current TV, which was sold in January 2013 to Qatar-based cable news channel Al Jazeera.

During Bill Clinton's presidency, Burkle was a key fundraiser and they became close friends. In 2002, Burkle hired Clinton as a senior advisor on two Yucaipa domestic investment funds. Clinton invested in a Yucaipa global fund focused on foreign companies. In an interview with The Wall Street Journal, then-U.S. Senator Hillary Clinton (D-NY) expressed concern that such investments could be used by foreign governments as "instruments of foreign policy."

In 2009, Bill Clinton ended his relationship with Yucaipa due to potential conflicts of interest. Following "months" of negotiations, the two were not able to agree on a final payment for Clinton's advisory services, estimated at up to $20 million, and Clinton "walked away" from the potential payout.

During a visit to the White House to celebrate the Pittsburgh Penguins' Stanley Cup victory in 2017, US President Donald Trump described Burkle as “a friend of mine for a long time.”

== Awards and recognition ==
Burkle's honors and awards include the Los Angeles County, California Boy Scouts Jimmy Stewart "Good Turn" Award, the AIDS Project Los Angeles Commitment to Life Award, and the Los Angeles Urban League Whitney M. Young Award. He has received numerous honors and awards from labor including the AFL-CIO Murray Green Meany Kirkland Community Service Award and the Los Angeles County Federation of Labor Man of the Year.

== Philanthropy ==
In 1997, Burkle donated $15 million for the construction of Walt Disney Concert Hall.

=== Ronald W. Burkle Foundation ===
Burkle is founder and chairman of The Ronald W. Burkle Foundation. The foundation's stated mission is to "positively influence people around the world and their communities" by supporting programs that "strengthen international understanding, foster worker's rights, empower underserved communities, nurture the arts and architecture, engage children in learning and advance scientific research."

=== Board memberships ===
Burkle is co-chairman of The Ronald W. Burkle Center for International Relations at UCLA, to promote "research on and promotes discussion of international relations, U.S. foreign policy, and complex issues of global cooperation and conflict." The Center has hosted UN Secretary-General Ban Ki-moon, and former U.S. presidents Bill Clinton and Jimmy Carter.

Burkle is a trustee of The Scripps Research Institute, The Carter Center, the National Urban League, Frank Lloyd Wright Building Conservancy and AIDS Project Los Angeles. He is a past board member of the J. Paul Getty Trust, the Los Angeles County Museum of Art, the Los Angeles Music Center, John F. Kennedy Center for the Performing Arts, and the Museum of Contemporary Art, Los Angeles.

=== Fundraising events ===
Burkle hosts fundraising events for the non-profit Share Our Strength and its No Kid Hungry campaign, which focuses on helping end childhood hunger in the United States.

Burkle also hosts events for The Rape Foundation at his Greenacres Estate.

== Personal life ==
Burkle is a fan of historic architecture. In 2011, he purchased the partially restored 1924 Ennis House, a Los Angeles landmark designed by Frank Lloyd Wright. In 2019, Burkle sold the house for $18 million. Burkle owns Greenacres, a 1928 estate in Beverly Hills, California, built for actor Harold Lloyd. Burkle owns two of entertainer Bob Hope's properties, acquiring his John Lautner-designed Palm Springs home for $13 million in 2016 and Toluca Lake, Los Angeles home, originally designed by Richard Finkelhor in the 1930s and expanded in the 1950s by John Elgin Woolf, for $15 million in 2017.

In December 2013, Burkle purchased an Olympic gold medal won by Jesse Owens at the 1936 Berlin Games for $1.4 million and owns William Faulkner's Nobel Prize for Literature.

Burkle owns a Mediterranean-styled mansion overlooking the bluffs of Black's Beach on a nearly six-acre plot in the La Jolla Farms neighborhood of San Diego, California. It was purchased on February 5, 1999, for $15.3 million and the current tax assessment is $34 million.

Burkle has worked with Novak Djokovic, world No.1 tennis player at the time, on strategic marketing and charitable initiatives.

In December 2018, the Serbian government opened a consulate in Montana and Burkle was named honorary consul of Serbia in the U.S. On account of that, he applied for Serbian citizenship, which the Serbian government accepted and he was formally naturalized on November 25, 2019, making him the third Serbian billionaire after Philip Zepter and Miroslav Mišković, according to Forbes's list.

On January 6, 2020, Burkle's son Andrew was found dead in his Beverly Hills home.

In December 2020, Burkle, a former family friend of singer-songwriter Michael Jackson, purchased Jackson's former Neverland Ranch property for $22 million as a "land banking opportunity".

== Controversies ==
After his divorce from his wife Janet, a long-running legal battle over the 1997 divorce settlement was decided in Burkle's favor in 2006, after his former wife accused him of defrauding her. According to court documents, his ex-wife also accused him of spying on her, her young son, and her new boyfriend. According to his own daughter, Burkle told her that he had sex tapes and compromising photos of his ex-wife produced for blackmail purposes. He later denied the allegations.

In April 2006, Burkle accused New York Post columnist Jared Paul Stern of attempting to extort money from him in exchange for stopping the publication of stories in Page Six, the paper's gossip column, about his private life. He secretly videotaped two private meetings between himself and Stern, with the second meeting orchestrated and monitored by the FBI. Stern allegedly asked Burkle for a $220,000 investment in his clothing business in exchange for better coverage. Stern was subsequently fired by the Post.

On April 30, 2008, a Delaware judge dismissed Burkle's lawsuit against Raffaello Follieri, ex-boyfriend of actress Anne Hathaway, after Follieri agreed to repay $1.3 million Burkle loaned to him in the Raffaello Follieri scandal. In 2018, Follieri, who was deported back to Italy in 2012 after serving 4 1/2 years in prison for the scandal, stated that he and Burkle were once again on good terms and that Burkle was among the group of investors helping him acquire 50 percent in the Foggia Calcio soccer club in Southern Italy.

Burkle's name was found in Jeffrey Epstein's black book and on Epstein's private jet log. Burkle took what were described as humanitarian trips to Africa with Bill Clinton on Epstein's private Boeing 727, sometimes referred to as "the Lolita Express". Following the Africa trip, Burkle reportedly returned home via a commercial jet, referring to Epstein as "creepy".

== See also ==
- List of billionaires
