= Wild Oats Markets =

U.S. organic food production company

Wild Oats Marketplace
- Formerly: Wild Oats Markets, Inc.
- Type: Subsidiary
- Industry: Natural and organic food production
- Founded: 1987 in Boulder, Colorado, United States
- Founders: Libby Cook; Mike Gilliland
- Headquarters: Addison, Texas, United States
- Area served: United States
- Key people: Tom Casey (CEO); James W. Keyes (Chairman)
- Owner: Yucaipa Companies
- Parent: Hidden Villa Ranch (2010–2012)
- Website: wildoats.com

The logo previously used by Wild Oats Marketplace.

Wild Oats Marketplace (registered as Wild Oats Marketing, LLC) is a producer of natural and organic food distributed through partnerships in the United States.

== History ==
Founded in 1987 in Boulder, Colorado, Wild Oats Marketplace was originally a chain of natural foods stores operating throughout the Western and Southwestern United States.

Wild Oats Markets acquired their local competitor, the 11-store Boulder-based Alfalfa's Markets chain, in July 1996. Three Capers Community Market natural foods stores, located in British Columbia, were part of the Alfalfa's acquisition and have maintained the Capers name. In 1999, Wild Oats acquired several other chains, including 11 San Diego–based Henry's Marketplace stores, the Nature's Northwest chain of stores in Portland, OR, and nine San Antonio–based Sun Harvest stores. Wild Oats announced that it would close all five Henry's Farmers Market stores in Arizona in December 2006, and would instead focus on the Wild Oats banner in that market.

In 2001, Perry Odak who previously held executive positions at Ben & Jerry's, became president and chief executive officer of Wild Oats Markets. Odak resigned in October 2006 after he and the company were unable to reach an agreement for a new employment contract. Gregory Mays, chairman of the board, was named interim chief executive officer. Mays is a former chief financial officer of Ralphs Grocery Co.

In 2007, Wild Oats Markets was purchased by Whole Foods Market, Inc, but an FTC objection resulted in a reversal of the purchase. In 2010, the company was bought by Luberski Inc. (d.b.a. as Hidden Villa Ranch), a West Coast–based food distributor, who then sold it to The Yucaipa Companies in 2012.

Wild Oats currently produces and distributes various food products, including cereal, beverages, condiments, frozen and fresh items through partnerships with Walmart stores nationally and formerly through Fresh & Easy stores in California, Nevada and Arizona (Fresh & Easy shut down in 2015). The company is headquartered in Addison, Texas.

== Partnerships ==
=== Pathmark stores ===
Wild Oats Markets partnered with Pathmark Stores beginning in February 2007 when Pathmark added Wild Oats brand private-label goods to all of its 141 northeast US stores. About 150 different natural and organic products were included in the partnership, including specialty products such as imported Italian sodas, balsamic vinegar, organic fruit spreads and flatbread crackers.

=== Walmart ===
After a partnership agreement by Yucaipa Cos., the relaunch of the branch occurred in April 2014 as an expansion of the organic selections at Walmart stores nationwide.

=== Fresh & Easy Markets ===
Fresh & Easy tested a new concept under the Wild Oats banner at a single store in Scottsdale, Arizona, in February 2015. The 10,000 square feet (930 m^{2}) store opened on February 6 and “...will help us garner insights and learnings about the [Wild Oats] brand and give customers even more options to shop for healthy convenience items," said a company spokesman. He said Fresh & Easy had no plans to put the Wild Oats name on any additional stores. Fresh & Easy decided to test the new Wild Oats concept in Scottsdale, the spokesman said, “because the original Wild Oats chain had a long history of stores there and we felt consumers there would be excited to have us use it as a test market.” The test was open-ended, he added, with no specific timeframe. The store was formally called Wild Oats by Fresh & Easy. Fresh & Easy went out of business later that year.

== Proposed sale to Whole Foods Market ==
On February 21, 2007, Whole Foods Market announced that it had agreed to acquire Wild Oats for an estimated $565 million (~$821 million in 2024).

On 27 June 2007, the Federal Trade Commission issued an administrative complaint challenging the acquisition. According to the complaint, the FTC believed that the proposed transaction "would violate federal antitrust laws by eliminating the substantial competition between these two uniquely close competitors in the operation of premium natural and organic supermarkets nationwide" and contended that "if the transaction goes forward Whole Foods would have the ability to raise prices and reduce quality and services."

On July 29, 2008, the Court of Appeals for the District of Columbia overturned the district court's decision allowing the merger. The Court of Appeals ruled that "premium natural, and organic supermarkets" ("PNOS"), such as Whole Foods and Wild Oats, constitute a distinct submarket of all grocers. The court ruled that "mission driven" consumers (those with an emphasis on social and environmental responsibility) would be adversely affected by the merger because substantial evidence by the FTC showed that Whole Foods intended to raise prices after consummation of the merger. In 2009, Whole Foods agreed to sell the Wild Oats chain.

== Notable achievements ==
- Supermarket News ranked Wild Oats No. 63 in the 2007 "Top 75 North American Food Retailers" based on 2006 fiscal year estimated sales of $1.2 billion.
- Wild Oats was included in Corporate Responsibility Officer (CRO) magazine's annual “100 Best Corporate Citizens” list for 2007, ranking No. 59 out of 1,100 U.S. public companies surveyed. The ranking is based on measures of corporate service to eight groups: shareholders, community, governance, diversity, employees, environment, human rights and product.
- Wild Oats contributed to the success of fairtrade bananas in its early days by committing to TransFair USA to replace the store's organic bananas with Fair Trade organic bananas. TransFair needed this commitment by a large retail chain to start this business, because of needed economies of scale and turnover speed.
