= Cyrk =

Cyrk may refer to:

- Cyrk (album), 2012 album by Cate Le Bon
- Cyrk (art), a style of contemporary Polish circus posters
- Cyrk (company), a promotions company
