= Marsha Vlasic =

American talent agent

- Born: 1946 (age 79–80); Brooklyn, New York
- Occupation: Talent agent
- Employer(s): Vice chairman, Music, Independent Artists Group
- Awards: Billboard Women In Music Executive of the Year (2025); Billboard Power 100; Pollstar Women of Live Hall of Fame

Marsha Vlasic is an American talent agent. She is president and vice chair, music, at Independent Artist Group.

== Early life ==
Vlasic was born and raised in a poor family in Brooklyn, New York. She described her childhood as unhappy, citing her father's illness and financial difficulties.

== Career ==
Vlasic began her career in the music industry as an assistant to two men who represented go-go dancers and bands. She subsequently assisted two agents for live music at American Talent International. Both agents were men. Later in her career she frequently addressed the gender disparity in the music industry and the difficulties women faced.

In 1993, after a brief stint at William Morris, she launched MVO, an acronym for both Marsha Vlasic Organization and My Very Own. Between 1993 and 2008, when the agency was acquired by ICM, she represented Neil Young, Elvis Costello, Van Morrison, Moby, Muse, Ozzy Osbourne, Lou Reed, Iggy Pop, Ben Folds, the Strokes and Regina Spektor, among others. She helped to pioneer the practice of packaging genre-diverse artists for festivals and tours with Moby’s Area One and Area Two tour, Ozzfest and the Horde tour, among others.

ICM acquired MVO in 2008, and Vlasic became a senior executive in its concerts division. She was appointed president of Independent Artist Group in 2014, where she expanded her roster to include artists including Billy Joel, Cyndi Lauper, and Metallica.

== Philanthropy and advocacy ==
Vlasic helped to create the Bridge School Benefit and held a key role in the annual benefit concert for 30 years. She served as an advisory board member for the Global Poverty Project.

She has been an advocate for women since early in her career. In 2019, in an open letter signed by a small group of senior women in the music industry, she called for Neil Portnow's resignation as president of The Recording Academy after he stated that to be nominated for Grammys, women needed to "step up."

== Recognition and selected awards ==
- Billboard Women in Music Executive of the Year (2025)
- Billboard Power 100 (2018, 2019, 2022, 2023, 2024, 2025, 2026) (Note: Vlasic was also included on the Billboard Power list, which preceded the Power 100, for several years.)
- Billboard Touring Power Players (2024, 2025, 2026)
- Women of Live Hall of Fame, Pollstar, 2024
- International Agent of the Year and Most Powerful Women in Live Music, Canadian Live Music awards
- Keynote speaker, Midem (2019)
- Variety Impact list
