= Vati =

Vati or VATI may refer to:

Places

- Vati (Rhodes) (Greek: βάτι), a village on the Greek island of Rhodes

People

- Daya Vati, mother of Guru Ram Das
- Daya Vati, wife of Dharma Vira

Other

- Vati (novel), 1987 novella by Peter Schneider (writer)
- Vati (German: Daddy), nickname of Werner Mölders
- Vati und Sohn, nickname for the German Mistel aircraft
- VATI, acronym meaning "vote against the incumbents"

== See also ==
- Raffaello Follieri scandal
