= McDonald's Monopoly =

Sales promotion

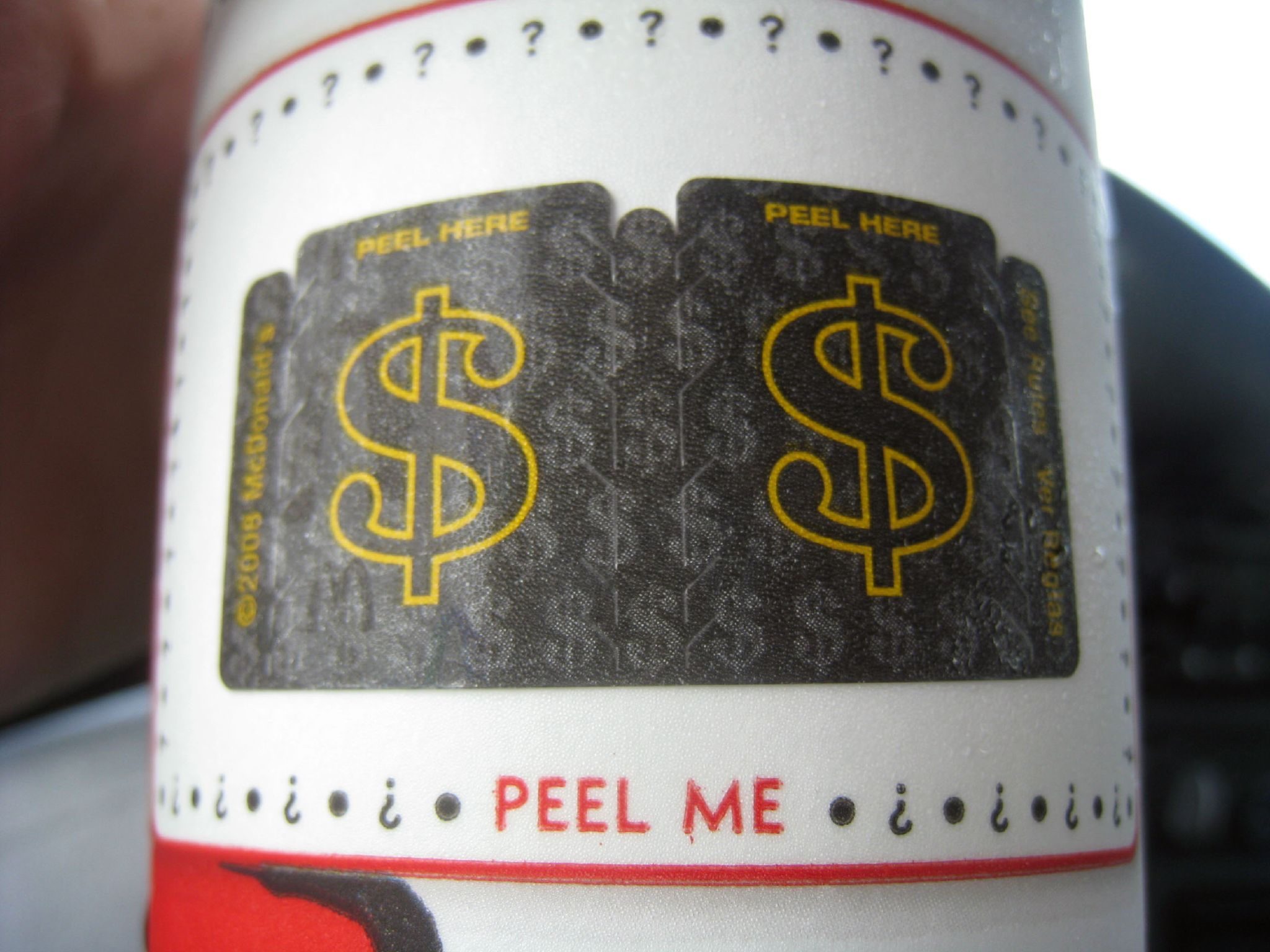
McDonald's Monopoly peel-off tokens

The McDonald's Monopoly game is a sales promotion run by fast food multinational restaurant chain McDonald's, with a theme based on the Hasbro board game Monopoly. The game first ran in the United States in 1987 and has since been used worldwide. In the game, customers collect game pieces based on properties found on the Monopoly board in order to win prizes, such as cash, automobiles and trips by collecting all properties of the same color (known as a Monopoly), but can also receive "instant win" tokens to redeem free food. Game pieces are usually printed on the packaging of certain items, such as a Big Mac or large fries. The top prize is won if a customer gets both of the dark blue properties (Park Place and Boardwalk in the U.S. game), and is usually a US$1,000,000 cash prize.

The promotion has used other names, such as Monopoly: Pick Your Prize! (2001), Monopoly Best Chance Game (2003–2005), Monopoly/Millionaire Game (2013), Prize Vault (2014), Money Monopoly (2016–2024), Get Your Bag (2025), Coast To Coast (2015–2024), Double Play (2024–present) in Canada, Golden Chances (2015), Prize Choice (2016), Win Win (2017), Wiiiin! (2018), V.I.P. (2021), Double Peel (2022-2023), Power Peel (2024), and Monopoly Special Edition (2025) in the United Kingdom.

== History ==
The promotion was first offered in the United States, in 1987. Following countries included Canada, Australia, Austria, France, Germany, Hong Kong, the Netherlands, New Zealand, Poland, Portugal, Romania, Russia, Singapore, South Africa, Spain, Switzerland, Taiwan, the United Kingdom. Argentina and Brazil were included in 2013 as well as South Korea in 2014 and Ireland in 2016, with the first two promos running in the Summer until 2018 when the promotion's dates went in sync with the UK's promotions. From 2003 to 2009, Best Buy was involved in the U.S. version, and later in the Canadian version.

Like many merchants, McDonald's offered sweepstakes to draw customers into its restaurants. Laws generally forbid a company from administering its own contests, in order to prevent fraud and to ensure that all prizes are given away; as a result, such promotions are handled by an impartial third-party company. McDonald's had a relationship with Simon Worldwide Inc., which was responsible for the distribution of the contest pieces and the awarding of major prizes.

In 2015, the Monopoly game was replaced in the US by "Game Time Gold", using an NFL theme. In 2020, in the UK, it was intended to run in the middle of March that year, but due to the COVID-19 pandemic, the promotion was postponed. Instead, the same promotion "Monopoly VIP" was instead run in 2021, with the promotion originally going to run in March but got delayed to August that year. As a result of the promotion being postponed, the stickers for that year's promotion had incorrect dates, as they were originally printed before the delay was made.

McDonald's Monopoly returned to the U.S. in 2025, after a decade-long hiatus.

== Gameplay ==
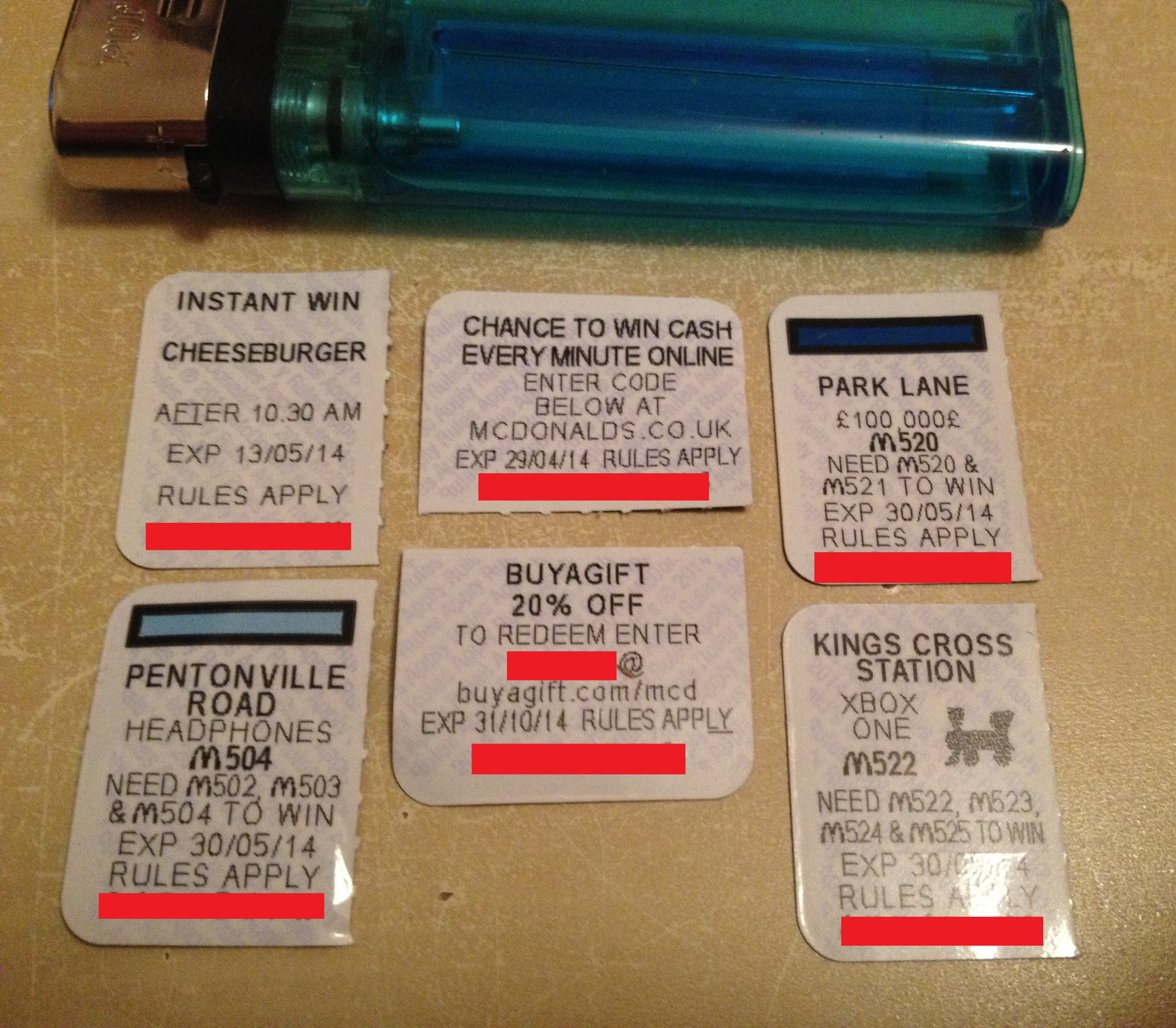
Example of a variety of tokens from the UK version of the game, 2014, with standard disposable cigarette lighter for scale

The promotion mimics the game Monopoly. The game is also advertised with tokens appearing in Sunday newspapers. Originally, customers received a set of two tokens with every purchase, but now tokens come only with certain menu items. Tokens correspond to a property space on the Monopoly board (with the exception of the Golden Avenue/Arches Avenue "properties", which were added in the 2008 edition; and Electric Company/Water Works utilities added in 2014). When combined into color-matched properties, the tokens may be redeemed for money or prizes. Historically, the grand prize ($1 million, annuity only) has been the combination of the two most costly properties, Park Place and Boardwalk, but in the 2006–2007 games the top prize ($5 million, with the traditional $1 million prize for Boardwalk/Park Place) was awarded for collecting the four railroads. In the 2025 game, the $1 million prize could only be won via the "Bonus Play" feature in the McDonalds app, with Bonus Plays being collected each time a customer redeems a game piece.

There are also "instant win" tokens the recipient can redeem for McDonald's food (typically small menu items, such as a free small McFlurry or medium fries) but never for any food item that has game pieces, money, or other prizes. The 2001 edition was titled "Pick Your Prize!", in which winners could choose which of three ways they wanted their prize awarded (i.e., they could choose gold, diamonds, or $50,000 per year for 20 years).

In 2016, the game changed so that all available prizes were cash, including the $1 million for Park Place and Boardwalk, and was titled "Money Monopoly".

In 2025, when the Monopoly promotion returned to the US, McDonalds largely discontinued the physical collecting aspect of the game and moved it to their own smartphone app, which is mainly used to order McDonalds food outside of the restaurant, restricting it to members of their MyMcDonald's Rewards loyalty program. While physical tokens will still be printed for the game, customers must redeem them in the McDonalds app in order to count in the game. Other food items were moved to be exclusively redeemed in the McDonalds app.

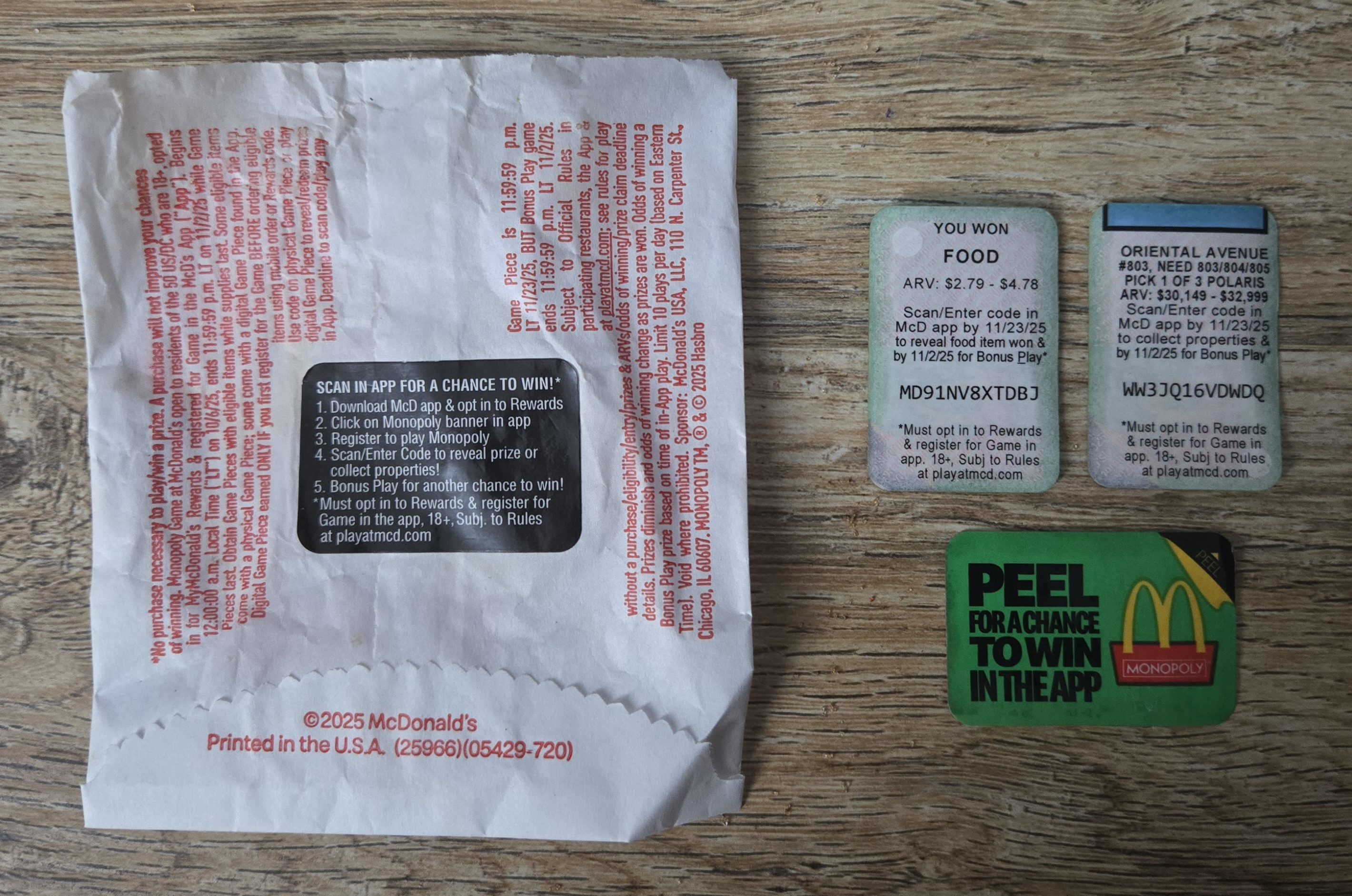
Game pieces for McDonald's Monopoly in 2025

=== Coupon pieces ===
Additionally, in the 2005 edition, certain foods always came with one coupon which could be used at either Best Buy, Toys "R" Us, or Foot Locker (including online stores). The value of each coupon was random, with Toys R Us coupons ranging from $1 to $5; up to $5 in coupons could be used in a single transaction. In 2008, these coupons were redeemed for up to 25% off any Foot Locker item(s). Since 2009, the promotion has not featured any coupons.

Canadian and US laws require that game pieces be available upon request with no purchase necessary (Alternative Method of Entry, "AMOE"), and could traditionally be requested by mailing a handwritten, self-addressed stamped envelope. In the 2025 promotion, McDonald's introduced an online method for obtaining AMOE entries, allowing participants to request entries via e-mail rather than by mail through the official McDonald's AMOE website.

=== Unclaimed prizes ===
Many of the prizes stay unclaimed. For example, in 2018, 25 million instant food prizes were offered in the promotion in the UK. However, only 8 million prizes were claimed overall. Out of 20 Mini Coopers offered, only 6 were claimed.

=== Rare pieces in US/Canada ===
The rare collectible pieces that dictate the odds of winning are as follows:

Property	2019 Canadian Name (Note: In 2016, the Canadian version replaced all properties with Canadian landmarks (such as replacing Boardwalk with Le Château Frontenac, and swapping Kentucky Avenue with the Confederation Bridge) and replaced all train stations with well-known Canadian airports, including Toronto Pearson International Airport and Vancouver International Airport.)	2026 prize	2025 prize	2019 prize	2018 prize	2017 prize	2016 prize	2014 prize	2013 prize	2012 prize	2011 prize	2010 prize	2009 prize
Mediterranean Avenue (Note: Until 2007, Mediterranean and Baltic Avenues were dark purple properties on the traditional Monopoly board; since 2008, they have been brown.)	Rideau Canal	Hilton Resort Getaway (Note: Ten Hilton gift cards valued at $365 each (equivalent to a ten-night stay at a Hilton property) and $3,800 for all other expenses)	Audio-Technica Turntable Bundle	2020 Chevrolet Equinox	Xbox One Forza Bundle	$150,000	$50 (Note: CA$100 in Canada)	$50 (Note: Paid in McDonald's gift cards in Canada.)	$1,000 (Note: CA$25 McDonald's gift card in Canada)	$50			
Vermont Avenue	Mackenzie River	Polaris General XP 1000 Premium, Slingshot S Autodrive or Polaris Patriot	Polaris Ranger XP 1000 Northstar, Indian Challenger or Slingshot SL	Yamaha Wolverine X4 EPS	Yamaha Family Grizzly ATV Bundle	2 Yamaha SnoScoot Snowmobiles & 250 Yamabucks gift cards	$1,000 (Note: Berkley Family Equipment Package in Canada)	Shell fuel for 1 Year (Note: $2,500 in Canada)	$5,000 (Note: $50 McDonald's gift card in Canada)	$5,000	$100		
Virginia Avenue	Percé Rock	$100,000	1,000,000 American Airlines AAdvantage miles	$10,000			$2,000 (Note: CA$10,000 in Canada)	$5,000	$10,000 (Note: $20,000 in Canada)	Beach Resort Vacation	$200 Spa Certificate		
Tennessee Avenue	Tunnels of Moose Jaw	Trip for 4 to Universal Orlando Resort		Cineplex Premiere Card for winner & guest for 1 Year			$5,000 (Note: Cineplex Premiere card in Canada)	Softcard Mobile Wallet Prize + $2,500 for wireless service (Note: $5,000 Wal-Mart Gift Card in Canada)	EA Sports Super Bowl XLVIII trip for 2 (Note: $5,000 Wal-Mart Gift Card in Canada)	$10,000	Beach Resort Vacation	$1,000	$5,000
Kentucky Avenue	Confederation Bridge	VIP Tour and Trip for 4 to Kennedy Space Center Visitor Complex		$5,000 in Prepaid MasterCard Gift Card			$10,000 (Note: $5,000 in Vanilla Prepaid Gift Cards in Canada)	Any Delta Air Lines Vacations Destination for 2			$50,000	Beaches Resorts Vacation	$10,000
Ventnor Avenue	Whistler	2027 Jeep Cherokee	2026 Jeep Grand Cherokee	Cabela's $2,000 Gift Card	Cabela's Barbeque Package	Cabela's Camping Package	$25,000 (Note: Polaris Snowmobile in Canada)	Beaches Resorts Vacation	$20,000 (Note: $10,000 in Canada)	$20,000	$100,000	$25,000	
Pennsylvania Avenue	Portage and Memorial	$500 Circle K Fuel Gift Card	$10,000 Lowe's Shopping Spree	$2,000 Hudson's Bay Gift Card			$50,000 (Note: $2,000 Hudson's Bay gift card in Canada)	Cessna Private Jet Trip	2014 Fiat 500L (Note: 2013 Fiat POP in Canada)	2013 Fiat 500 Sport Hatchback	2012 Nissan Leaf or 370z	$50,000	
Boardwalk	Fairmont Le Château Frontenac	Carnival Cruise Line Vacation Package (Note: $7,000 in Carnival Cruise Line gift cards to pay for a cruise and a $3,000 prepaid gift card for all other expenses)	2026 Winnebago View	5,000,000 RBC Rewards Points or CAN$50,000		2018 Volkswagen Atlas SUV	$1,000,000 (Note: in annuity, 2017 Volkswagen Golf SportsWagen in Canada)	$1,000,000 (Note: as an annuity)	$1,000,000 (Note: as an annuity, $100,000 for Canada)	$1,000,000			
Short Line	Vancouver International Airport	$100,000 (Note: Advertised as "$100,000 from Monopoly GO! usable towards the purchase of Gold Bars")	Trip for Up to Four to a Monopoly GO! Location (Note: Trip to any one of New York City, Paris, London, Tokyo, Los Angeles, Las Vegas, Amsterdam, Barcelona, New Orleans, Monaco or Maui)	Air Transat trip to Playa del Carmen for 4	Air Transat trip to Riviera Maya for 4	3,000 WestJet Dollars	$500 (Note: A "dream vacation" in Canada)	$5,000 Target Shopping Experience on Black Friday (Note: $1,000 in Canada)	Shell Fuel for 1 Year (Note: $5,000 in Canada)	EA SPORTS Fan Trip Championship Get-A-Way	EA SPORTS Trip		$500
Reading Railroad	Route Transcan Highway	$100,000	Trip for Up to Four to a Monopoly GO! Location	Esso/Mobil $2,600 Gift Card "Petrol for 52 Weeks"		Shell "Fuel for a Year"							
Water Works/Electric Company	N/A	$5,000 Best Buy Shopping Spree	Samsung 77-inch TV from Best Buy										

In 2013, McDonald's allowed two Boardwalk pieces to be produced; prior to this only one was produced. McDonald's added Golden Avenue and Arches Avenue for 2008 only; obtaining both won $100,000. For 2014 only, McDonald's added Electric Company and Water Works; obtaining both won $10,000. For 2014 only, Free Parking was added, with a $100,000 prize.

=== Online games ===
In 2005, McDonald's introduced an online counterpart to its traditional game. In addition to the traditional "sticker" game, participants can play online. Each game piece lists a code which can be entered online, to a maximum of 10 entries per 24 hours, a day starts at midnight EDT. Up to 2014, each code entered grants the user one roll on a virtual Monopoly game board, identical to the board game's board. Rolling "doubles" (two dice sharing the same number), as with the real board game, allows the user to move again.

Landing on Electric Company, Income Tax, Jail/Just Visiting, Go to Jail, Water Works, or Luxury Tax does not count towards any prize. If a player lands on an unowned property (not landed upon by the player in a previous turn), the user will "collect" that property. When all properties of a colored set are collected, the user wins a prize, with prize values similar to those of the sticker game. In addition to collecting property sets, users can also win by landing on certain "instant win" spaces, including Go, Chance, Community Chest, and Free Parking. Landing on Go (but not simply passing it) gives the player a code worth one free hour of WiFi access at participating McDonald's restaurants. Landing on Chance is worth money to spend at Foot Locker. Landing on Community Chest allows the user to be given a code worth 25 My Coke Rewards points. Landing on Free Parking is a prize of a $50 refillable gas card from Shell, or alternatively 25 complimentary apple pies.

In 2007, landing on Community Chest won game downloads.

In 2009, the prizes became two hours of Wi-Fi and a $25 Arch Card for landing on Go, an entry into an online roll for $1,000,000 (annuity) for landing on Chance, 25 My Coke Rewards points for landing on Community Chest, and a $50 refillable Shell gift card for landing on Free Parking.

The values of the dice are not random. As stated in the contest rules, one property in each set is "rare", similar to the sticker game. These rare properties are landed on only when the game server "seeds" a winning roll. Winning rolls are seeded at specific times on specific dates, and the first user to roll the dice once a win has been seeded will land on a winning piece. This allows McDonald's to declare the odds of winning certain prizes, a legal requirement for contests in most jurisdictions.

In 2010, the online game was changed, removing the dice and the game board, presenting only three Chance cards from which to pick. One has a prize, starting at 30 My Coke Rewards points, but may be (non-randomly) seeded with a higher-valued prize. Player chooses one card, is asked if that is the choice the player wants to make, and the card is flipped. If it is the pre-selected winning card, the player wins the pre-selected prize.

In 2011, the game was changed again – the mascot, Rich Uncle Pennybags (aka "Mr. Monopoly"), is shown attempting to throw a Chance card into a top hat. If the card lands in the hat, the player can claim a prize. Players must choose a "throwing style", which only changes the animations used – it does nothing to affect one's odds of winning.

In 2012, the game was changed once more. Players must click on "Spin" first, and if it landed on "GO!", the player wins the online prize shown. The next year, players had to click on "Play"; a win resulted in the prize shown onscreen; regardless of the outcome, players received an entry to win a 2013 Fiat 500 Cabrio. For the 2014 game, players must click on "GO!", and if it results in a win, the online prize is shown onscreen; regardless of the outcome, the participant receives an entry to win $50,000.

In 2016, players can enter up to ten codes daily in order to win weekly sweepstakes with a $50,000 grand prize.

=== Restrictions ===
For all versions of the online game, players are restricted to a set number of online entries per day. In the UK, this is restricted to 24 entries. In the US, Guam & Puerto Rico, the limit is 8 total, via Chance cards (bonus Chance card given if designated item is bought) & regular game tickets, starting October 2026.

Players in the UK must be aged 18 years or older. The official rules state: "The purchase, sale, trading, or barter of Game Pieces, Game Stamps, FREE Codes or Game Codes via Online or live auctions, or any other methods, does not constitute Legitimate Channels and is expressly prohibited." This includes eBay.com, where it is also a violation of that site's lottery policy.

== Criticism ==
The promotion has been criticized for incentivizing ordering more and upsizing the portions. In 2019, Deputy Leader of the UK Labour Party, Tom Watson, said that the Monopoly promotion was a "danger to public health" and urged McDonald's to drop the "grotesque marketing strategy".

=== Fraud ===
In 2001, the U.S. promotion was halted after fraud was uncovered. A subcontracting company, Simon Marketing (then a subsidiary of Cyrk), which had been hired by McDonald's to organize and promote the game, failed to recognize a flaw in its procedures. Simon's chief of security Jerome P. Jacobson ("Uncle Jerry"), a former police officer, stole the most valuable game pieces. Jacobson justified his long-running multimillion-dollar crime as his reaction to Simon executives having rerun randomized draws to ensure that high-level prizes went to areas in the United States rather than Canada, although he did not take the stolen pieces to Canada. He began stealing winning game pieces after a supplier mistakenly provided him a sheet of the anti-tamper seals needed to securely conduct the legitimate transfer of winning pieces. Jacobson first offered the game pieces to friends and family but eventually began selling them to Gennaro "Jerry" Colombo of the Colombo crime family, whom he had met by chance at the Atlanta airport. Colombo would then recruit people to act as contest winners in exchange for half of the winnings. In late 1995, Colombo appeared in a nationally televised McDonald's commercial promoting his (fraudulent) win of a Dodge Viper.

In 1995, St. Jude Children's Hospital in Memphis, Tennessee, received an anonymous letter with a Dallas, Texas, postmark that contained a $1 million winning game piece. Although game rules prohibited the transfer of prizes, McDonald's awarded the $1 million as a donation to the hospital, making the final $50,000 annuity payment in 2014. Investigations later revealed that Jacobson had admitted to sending the winning piece to the hospital. In June 1996, Colombo's father-in-law William "Buddy" Fisher came forward as a winner with a stolen $1 million Monopoly piece. After Colombo died in a 1998 traffic accident, Jacobson found new accomplices to help him sell the stolen game pieces.

Jacobson's associates and those of his collaborators won almost all of the top prizes, including cash and cars, between 1995 and 2000, including McDonald's giveaways outside of the Monopoly promotion. The associates netted over $24 million. While the fraud appeared to have been perpetrated by only one key employee of the promotion company, and not by the company's management, eight people were originally arrested, soon growing to 21 indicted people, including members of the Colombo crime family. By the end of the criminal prosecutions, 53 people were indicted, of whom 48 pled guilty: 46 in pretrial plea agreements and two who changed their pleas from not guilty to guilty during their trials.

McDonald's severed its relationship with Simon Marketing and each company filed lawsuits against the other for breach of contract that were eventually settled out of court. The case brought forth by McDonald's was dismissed but Simon received $16.6 million. Four of the putative winners convicted of fraud had their convictions reversed on appeal on grounds of a constitutional violation, as they did not know Jacobson and thus did not know that the winning game pieces were necessarily stolen.

Jacobson pleaded guilty to three counts of mail fraud in federal court in Jacksonville, Florida, and served three years in federal prison. The trial began on September 10, 2001, but was overshadowed in the media by the September 11 attacks that occurred the next day.

In August 2018, 20th Century Fox announced plans for a film based on the Jacobson fraud, with Ben Affleck attached as director, Paul Wernick and Rhett Reese as writers and Matt Damon in an acting role. Separately, HBO produced the docuseries McMillions, which premiered in 2020.

== See also ==
- Pepsi Number Fever
