= Independent Artist Group =

American talent agency from Los Angeles

- Type: Private
- Industry: Talent and literary agency
- Predecessor: Agency for the Performing Arts (APA); Artist Group International (AGI)
- Founded: 2023
- Headquarters: Los Angeles, California
- Number of locations: Los Angeles, New York, Nashville, Atlanta, Toronto, London
- Key people: Jim Osborne (CEO); Dennis Arfa (Chairman, Music); Marsha Vlasic (Vice chairman, Music); Kyle Loftus (President)
- Website: independentartistgroup.com

IAG (also known as Independent Artist Group) is a talent agency in the entertainment industry with headquarters in Los Angeles, New York, Nashville, Atlanta, Toronto, and London. the company represented actors, writers, producers, showrunners, directors, performers, physical production services, film studios, as well as luxury and lifestyle brands across all media platforms worldwide. The company was formed from the merger of two talent agencies, Agency for the Performing Arts (APA) and Artist Group International (AGI). Jim Osborne was named the Agency's CEO and Dennis Arfa was named as the Chairman of the Music Division. Both are members of the board as is IAG President Kyle Loftus.

== History ==
APA was founded in New York in 1962 by former MCA executives David Baumgarten (c. 1917–1995), Roger Vorce (1929–2018) and Harvey Litwin (1931–2020). Early clients included The Doors, Harry Belafonte, Johnny Cash, Tina Turner, Steve Martin, Janis Joplin, Jefferson Airplane, Rosemary Clooney, and Liberace.

The agency also packaged feature films and television series such as Away on Netflix, The Dublin Murders on Showtime, All Rise on CBS, and For Life on ABC, as well as TV series Home Improvement and Roseanne. APA was one of the first among the top 5 packaging agencies to sign the WGA's new franchise agreement on January 21, 2020, when the agency integrated its Television and Motion Picture departments under one APA Scripted Literary banner.

On September 4, 2020, financier Ron Burkle's Yucaipa Companies made a non-equity financial investment in APA .

In 2023 APA and Artist Group International (AGI) merged and rebranded to Independent Artist Group.

=== Divisions ===
The agency's divisions include Alternative & Factual Programming, Scripted Literary, Talent, Intellectual Property, Branding Partnerships, Comedy & Live Podcasts, Global Touring, Physical Production, Theater and Speakers. Predecessor APA was the 5th largest talent agency in the United States after Creative Artists Agency, United Talent Agency, William Morris Endeavor, and ICM Partners. They are larger in size than Paradigm Talent Agency, The Gersh Agency, Innovative Artists, Abrams Artists Agency, and Don Buchwald & Associates.

The agency's on-camera and theatrical talent include such actors as Gary Oldman, Sylvester Stallone, Taraji P Henson, Regina Hall,Curtis "50 Cent" Jackson, Cole Hauser, Lindsay Lohan, Chris Tucker, William H. Macy, Mary J. Blige, Donnie Yen, Sharon Stone, Nathalie Emmanuel, Ken Jeong, Marc Maron, Maria Bello, Lili Taylor, Kate Bosworth, Famke Janssen, Tyrese Gibson, Eddie Izzard, and Lucas Till.

The agency also represents such touring musical artists as Billy Joel, Metallica, 50 Cent, Mary J. Blige, Def Leppard, Rod Stewart, Motley Crue, Ghost, Sleep Token, Disturbed, Neil Young, BigXthaPlug, Ne-Yo, The Strokes, Cage The Elephant, Daryl Hall, Norah Jones, Smashing Pumpkins, Elvis Costello and comedy touring artists, Ronny Chieng, Josh Johnson, Mike Epps, Martin Lawrence, Eddie Izzard, and Ms. Pat.

APA was a driving force behind such non-fiction series as Dance Moms (Lifetime), Leah Remini: Scientology and the Aftermath (A&E), Dr. Pimple Popper (TLC), Unidentified (History), and Blown Away (Netflix). The agency also represents the Executive Producers of hit non-fiction series such as Nailed It (Netflix), So You Think You Can Dance (Fox), Let’s Make a Deal (CBS), and Pyramid (ABC).

The agency represents numerous authors and storytellers in the area intellectual property, whose works have been adapted for film, streaming, television and Broadway, including author Gregory Maguire, author Lee Child, Charlaine Harris , New York Times bestselling fantasy author Brandon Sanderson (Mistborn), New York Times bestselling author C.J. Box (The Highway, adapted by David E. Kelley for the ABC series “Big Sky”), bestselling author James Rollins (Sigma Force franchise), Patrick O’Brian (Master & Commander), New York Times bestselling author and National Book Award winner Neal Shusterman (Challenger Deep), the Truman Capote estate, and the Richard Wright estate, among others.

== Controversies ==
In 2017, then APA agent Tyler Grasham was accused of assaulting several current or former child actors, including Blaise Godbe Lipman (who stated that Grasham assaulted him ten years earlier when he was looking for representation) and Lucas Ozarowski, a film and TV editor who stated that he was also assaulted by Grasham. Stranger Things actor Finn Wolfhard, who was represented by Grasham at the time, parted ways with both the agent and APA in the wake of the allegations. After a prompt investigation, the agency terminated Grasham's employment.

In 2017, a former agent of APA accused the agency of sexual discrimination, harassment and assault, alleging that a partner at the firm sent her graphic text messages and threatened to have her fired for refusing the advances. A private investigation commissioned by APA concluded that the agent fabricated her claims to extort money from the agency. APA subsequently filed a Demand for Arbitration pursuant to the agent's employment agreement. In response, the former agent filed a lawsuit with the California Superior Court, citing the same allegations. APA successfully moved to compel the matter be decided by arbitration.

In 2020 APA's president Jim Osborne and his client, Oscar winner actor Gary Oldman, were defendants in a lawsuit brought by scriptwriter Ben Kaplan over the script for the film Darkest Hour. Other defendants in the ongoing case include NBC Universal, producer Douglas Urbanski, Working Title Film Group and Focus Features. Ben Kaplan claims the defendants plagiarized part of an original screenplay about Winston Churchill that he'd spent years developing, with drafts to which the defendants had had access. He also claims Mr. Oldman had signed to his Churchill script before dropping the project and joining Darkest Hour.
