= Joseph Sequenzia =

- Born: Connecticut
- Occupation: Advertising executive

Joseph Sequenzia is an American advertising executive and entrepreneur. He is the CEO/owner of milk*, a Connecticut based advertising agency, Founder of YUP PUP a health-based dog food and nutrition company, a board member of the West Chester University Poetry Center, a co-founder of Ashe Collection (a support for Africa group), an advising artist of Evolve the Conversation, an endeavor centered on the arts and conversations surrounding them and owner of m2 milk*media. In 2017 Sequenzia founded a cannabis infused all natural protein bar, which through an acquisition became partners with Acreage, a cannabis investment company. In 2019 consulting, Sequenzia became Chief Marketing Officer of Caliva, a cannabis company. While at Caliva, he launched Monogram, the cannabis venture with recording artist and producer JAY-Z.

Educated at Parsons School of Design in New York, he joined Grey Advertising New York where he was employed as an art director working on national and international businesses in the realm of print, television and radio. While at Grey NY he worked on campaigns for Kohler, American Museum of Natural History, Bloomingdale's, Domino's Pizza and Mitsubishi, amongst others.

He then joined startup Ryan Partnership started by ex Marketing Corporation of America executive David Ryan. There he earned awards and praise as he worked on the Pepsi business focusing on the new youth market being identified as "Generation Next" and working with Sir Richard Branson and Simon Wright launching Virgin Megastores in the U.S.

He joined the startup cable network FX in New York as a writer/producer, which was new concept in television programming. The entire network took place live within one large apartment located downtown in New York City, switching between rooms for different shows and dayparts.

Sequenzia then joined the innovation-based agency Fusion 5 as creative director. Working on Nike, Coca-Cola USA bottle and fountain, Champion Athletics, The Atlanta Olympic Games and RJ Reynolds business In 1997 he was hired by Cyrk to be the creative director of their newly formed marketing arm based in New York City. There he worked on initiating consumer loyalty programs for Marlboro, FUSA, MasterCard, McDonald's and the Pepsi-Stuff program Additional clients included Howard Schultz, aiding Starbucks in their loyalty program, and forming a new venture with NBA basketball player Shaquille O'Neal called "TWISM" ("the world is mine"). This led to Cyrk being named PROMO magazine's Agency of the Year in 1998.

Sequenzia was then hired by Interpublic Group's Draft Worldwide Draft Worldwide (now DraftFCB) as executive vice president, executive creative director of Draft NY, under the condition that he run, then shut down their now fledgling acquisition of Marketing Corporation of America through the end of the buyout term of eighteen months.

Sequenzia founded milk* initially in New York, then moving the agency to Connecticut in 2003. In 2011 milk* were hired by entrepreneurial energy buyers to take advantage of deregulated energy policies and launched North American Power. Ultimately growing the business to employ some 5,000 with sales of $300m+. North American Power had several business units, direct sales associates and affiliate programs leading to their acquisition by Calpine Corp in 2016.

milk* launched ready to eat pasta brand for white label pasta manufacturing company Carla's Pasta. Initially as a consulting project to help solidify their relationship supplying pasta for US Foods, milk* quickly saw that the only way for Carla's to "control their own destiny" was to bring forth their own line of ready-to-eat microwavable pasta dinners. The result was "Carla's Pasta" which milk* designed all aspects of the brand. This resulted in business growth from approximately $90m to $160m and a new factory built to accommodate volume demands
