= George Ralphs =

American businessman (1850–1914)

- Born: George Albert Ralphs; September 23, 1850; Joplin, Missouri, U.S.
- Died: June 21, 1914 (aged 63); San Bernardino, California, U.S.
- Resting place: Evergreen Cemetery, Los Angeles
- Occupation: Businessman
- Years active: 1873–1914
- Known for: Founder of Ralphs
- Spouse: Wallula Von Keith (m. 1896–1914)
- Children: 2

George Albert Ralphs (September 23, 1850 – June 21, 1914) was an American businessman. He founded the Ralphs supermarket chain in Southern California, with the help of his brother Walter.

== Early life and career ==
George Albert Ralphs was born in Joplin, Missouri, in 1850. His family moved to California on a prairie schooner and a yoke of oxen when he was a boy. Once he was settled in San Bernardino, George Ralphs was trained as an expert bricklayer and even developed a reputation as the "Champion Bricklayer of California".

Ralphs also worked in Los Angeles. After losing an arm in an accident, he gave up bricklaying and found work as a clerk in a small grocery store. In 1873, he had saved enough money to purchase his own grocery at Sixth and Spring Streets. He opened his first store, Ralphs and Francis, in 1873, in the Spring Street Financial District of Los Angeles with S. A. Francis. From then on, Ralphs prospered, operating three of the largest stores in Los Angeles. In 1879, Ralphs bought Francis's share of the company for $2,000, took his brother Walter as a business partner, and renamed their business Ralphs Brothers. The company was incorporated in 1909 as Ralphs Grocery Company. Today, Ralphs supermarkets are owned by the Kroger Company, with locations in Los Angeles, Orange, San Diego, Ventura, Riverside, and San Bernardino counties.

== Personal life ==
Ralphs married Wallula Von Keith on July 23, 1896. The couple had two children, Annabell and Albert George. Albert later became the vice president and manager of Ralphs Grocery Company.

== Death ==
On June 21, 1914, Ralphs was with his family for a weekend trip to the San Bernardino Mountains. While taking a walk with his wife in Waterman's Canyon, Ralphs stopped to rest on top of a boulder. As he attempted to help his wife up to sit beside him, the boulder became dislodged and began rolling down the mountain side along with Ralphs. In the process, one of his legs got caught and was severely injured. He was taken to Ramona Hospital (now known as Community Hospital of San Bernardino) where he underwent surgery to have his injured leg amputated. Ralphs awoke from the surgery and spoke to his wife for a few minutes, but died of shock later that afternoon.

Ralphs's body was shipped back to Hollywood where he and his family lived. His funeral was held on June 24. He was buried in Evergreen Cemetery in Los Angeles.
