= Golden State Foods =

Food service company

- Type: Private
- Industry: Food packaging, Agriculture, Food industry and Logistics
- Founded: Los Angeles Area, California (1947)
- Headquarters: Irvine, California
- Key people: Brian Dick (President/CEO)
- Products: foods and beverages wholesale
- Revenue: $5.1 billion USD (2022 estimate)
- Number of employees: over 6000 (2024)
- Website: www.goldenstatefoods.com

Golden State Foods (GSF) is a US business-to-business company that serves quick service restaurants, primarily McDonald’s. GSF is one of the biggest and longest-serving suppliers to McDonald's restaurants, including liquid products, and it is McDonald's third-largest beef supplier in the U.S. market. Other restaurants served by GSF include Starbucks, Chick-fil-A, Taco Bell, KFC and Wendy's.

== History ==
=== 1947-1999 ===
The company was founded in 1947 by Bill (William) Moore and Frank Streeter and began as a small meat company to supply products to Los Angeles area restaurants and hotels. It is a 100% management-owned and -operated company. In the early 1950s, it started providing meat products to McDonald's Corporation.

By 1972, the founder William Moore, who was a friend of Ray Kroc, decided to make McDonald's its exclusive and unique client. In 1980, James E. Williams and a group of investors acquired Golden State Foods for $29 million, even though the company was making $330 million in annual revenue.

On June 12, 1984, GSF employee Samuel Vasquez, 22 years old, was ground to death by a meat grinder in Golden State Foods' City of Industry, California facility when his coworker turned on the machine while he was inside. The machine was able to turn on due to the failure of Golden State Foods to practice lockout–tagout procedures mandated by safety regulations. Their practice was to clean with the machine running as it was slightly easier. California OSHA and the Los Angeles County District Attorney filed a criminal charge against the company over this matter. Golden State Foods pleaded no contest to the criminal charge.

With 12 manufacturing plants and distribution centers in the United States, Australia and Egypt, GSF generated $1.5 billion in sales in 1997, still with only one unique customer, McDonald's. In 1998, the Chairman and CEO James E. Williams, along with Butler Capital Corp, sold Golden State Foods to Wetterau Associates, a St. Louis-based investment group led by the CEO Mark Wetterau and The Yucaipa Companies with the latter as the majority stakeholder. The acquirers announced their intention to sell to more customers than just McDonald's.

=== 2000-2011 ===
Chef Gold was launched in 2000 to produce liquid products, such as ketchup and mustard, and cooked meat products for a variety of customers. In the same year, GSF formed a self-serving subsidiary called Centralized Leasing Company (CLC) to provide GSF with leasing services. In 2002 Signature Services was launched to offer customized services such as store painting, lot striping, power washing and landscaping. In partnership with The Arthur Wells Group in St. Louis; GSF formed CFM Logistics to help clients with their freight distribution needs. By 2017, the company serviced approximately 25,000 restaurants.

Prior to 2000, the entirety of GSF's revenue came from McDonald's. With the expansion of its customer base, by 2006, the company's dependency on McDonald's was reduced to 80%. The vice president of distribution said in 2006 that they choose their new customers in such a way to avoid upsetting McDonald's.

GSF established the GSF Foundation, a nonprofit organization, in 2002 to provide support to children and families in need through volunteering and donations.

In 2004, Golden State Foods became a 100% management-owned and operated company with the acquisition of 50.3% of the company that was owned by Yucaipa Companies.

Four GSF distribution centers received awards for food safety in 2004.

In 2006, Quality Custom Distribution (QCD) was formed as a subsidiary of GSF. As of February 2020, QCD delivered supplies to over 7,500 stores, including Starbucks, Chipotle Mexican Grill and Chick-fil-A.

In 2009, an employee was crushed and killed by a robotic palletizer at GSF's City of Industry Plant. The company pleaded guilty to a felony violation of machinery lockout-tagout and fined $2 million. Additionally, the company pleaded guilty to violating California Labor Code 6425 in January 2013 for "the willful violation of Title 8 of the California Code of Regulations § 3314(h)". The manager responsible was convicted of a misdemeanor and placed on probation.

=== 2012-present ===
In May 2012, a 60-foot truck operated by Dawayne Eacret employed by GSF / Quality Custom Distribution (QCD) killed a bicyclist named Kathryn Rickson while making a right turn in downtown Portland, Oregon. The family and GSF settled a subsequent lawsuit on the eighth day of a civil trial, with GSF agreeing to give $700,000 to the family.

In November 2012, GSF acquired KanPak China, a manufacturing company for customers in the quick-service restaurant industry. GSF then acquired KanPak U.S. the next year. In 2013, GSF sold its Rochester, New York distribution facility to another McDonald's supplier, Anderson-DuBose Co.

A company recalled retail packaged walnuts intended to be sold in Kansas City, Kansas supplied by Golden State Foods when they tested positive for listeria in 2014 in a FDA sampling.

GSF's QCD subsidiary acquired restaurant supplier Mile Hi Specialty Foods, which served approximately 1,000 stores. in November 2016. GSF formed QCD Rocky Mountain LLC to run the unit. QCD opened a new facility in Fontana, California, dedicated to servicing Starbucks stores in July 2018. In March 2019, GSF opened a 165,000-square-foot meat processing plant in Opelika, Alabama. Forbes named GSF in its "Blockchain 50" list in April 2019 for its tracking of food safety data across its supply chain. QCD opened a distribution center, in Salt Lake City, in June 2019.

GSF began using RFID to track the movement of their fresh beef as well as Internet of things devices to monitor its temperature in a pilot program with IBM in 2019.

In late 2019, GSF's QCD moved its headquarters to Frisco, Texas and acquired four warehouses in the Midwest and Northeast regions in February 2020, becoming Starbucks' top supplier These four warehouses opened for business between March and September, 2020.

On June 1, 2020, during a protest against police brutality in Portland, Maine, a tractor trailer driver for GSF's Quality Custom Distribution slowly drove into a crowd of protesters following a delivery. The driver was arrested on a felony charge of reckless conduct with a dangerous weapon.

In July 2020, GSF's City of Industry, California facility was closed by the health department after failing to report an outbreak of 43 cases of COVID-19 to the health department as required. The facility reopened less than 24 hours later.

In June 2023, Brian Dick became the president/COO to replace former CEO Mark Wetterau who died in May 2023. Wetterau was the CEO for 25 years. In July 2024, Dick was promoted to president and CEO.

In August 2024, the company sold a controlling interest in its business to the Lindsay Goldberg private equity firm.

In August 2024, it was reported that the company's QCD division planned to close a facility by November 2024 and terminate 54 employees in Schertz, Texas.

In 2025, GSF sold 90% of its Egypt operations to a subsidiary of Kerry Group.

== Operations ==
GSF has five core sectors of business: protein products, like hamburgers; liquid products, like salad dressings; dairy, like ice cream; fresh produce; and logistics. As a supplier of McDonald's, GSF helped create the recipe for Big Mac sauce, among others. The company exports products to more than 50 countries. The company also owns locations in China.
