= Henry's Farmers Market =

Former grocery retailer brand name

Boney’s Market
- Genre: Supermarkets
- Founded: 1943
- Defunct: February 2011 via merger with Sprouts Farmers Market
- Successor: Sprouts Farmers Market
- Headquarters: La Mesa, California, USA
- Owner: Henry Boney https://windmillfarmsmarket.com/about-us/
- Website: henrysmarkets.com

Henry's Farmers Market (also known as Boney’s Market and Henry's) was a natural-foods grocery retailer headquartered in La Mesa, California.

== History ==
Henry’s Farmers Market was an operator of natural-foods stores. The company was established in 1943 when Henry Boney and his family opened a fruit stand on a street corner in San Diego, beginning with a truckload of peaches. Over the following decades, the fruit-stand business expanded into a chain of grocery stores.

=== Mergers and acquisitions ===
The Henry's chain included 23 stores in Southern California and one in Northern California in 1999, when it was acquired by Wild Oats Markets. After the buyout, the Boney family developed the Arizona-based Sprouts Farmers Market; the first store opened in Chandler, Arizona, in 2002.

Following a merger in August 2007, Wild Oats—including the Henry's Farmers Market locations—was acquired by Whole Foods Market.

In October 2007, Whole Foods Market sold all 35 Henry's Farmers Market and Sun Harvest Market stores to a subsidiary of Los Angeles grocer Smart & Final for $166 million (~$241 million in 2024). Earlier in 2007, Smart & Final had been acquired by the private equity firm Apollo Management.

In December 2010, Henry's announced plans to open its first Idaho store in the downtown area of Boise in 2011. However, a week after the announcement, plans for the Boise store were stalled.

In early 2011, the Boney family's second venture, Sprouts, was purchased by Apollo Management, which announced that it would be merging Sprouts and Henry's Farmers Market. The combined company, which operates under the name Sprouts Farmers Market, had 98 stores and more than 7,000 employees at the time the transaction closed in the second quarter of 2011.
