= Cyrk (company) =

Promotions company

- Founded: Gregory Shlopak
- Founder: 1976
- Defunct: 2009

Cyrk was once one of the largest promotions companies in the world with over 2,000 employees worldwide. The company's stock was listed on NASDAQ under the ticker symbol CYRK. It was founded in 1976 by Gregory Shlopak and Paul Butman.

== Rise ==
The bulk of CYRK's revenues were generated from the sale of custom promotional products employed as consumer rewards in points-based consumer loyalty promotions.

CYRK had three very successful public offerings between early 1993 and late 1994 underwritten by Montgomery Securities, all of which were oversubscribed.

In 1997 the company, "already a significant player through its management of the Marlboro Gear and Pepsi Stuff continuity programs" acquired Los Angeles-based Simon Marketing, making it one of the largest agencies in the promotion industry. They were named Agency of the Year by Promo Magazine in 1998. Although CYRK lost the Pepsi Stuff account in 1998 as it moved to a Coca-Cola account that never rivaled the success with Pepsi, they boasted McDonald's and Philip Morris as their two top clients. They also did significant business with Beanie Babies-maker Ty Inc. While Philip Morris accounted for 90% of the companies' business in 1994 through the acquisition of Simon, McDonald's alone accounted for 61% of the consolidated revenue in 1999. On March 31, 1997, CYRK purchased Monroe, WA based Tonkin, Inc. At the time Caterpillar Inc. was Tonkin's largest account. The Tonkin acquisition was intended to allow CYRK to penetrate the business-to-business segment of the promotions industry and to serve as a further diversification initiative.

Although based in Gloucester, Massachusetts, the company's marketing arm from 1994 to 1999 was a New York-based operation called Integrated Marketing Solutions, with President Laurel Rossi, who left the company in February 1999 to move to Hill Holliday Direct as executive VP and director of client services. and Joseph Sequenzia as Executive Creative Director, who left the company in 1998 to join IPG company Draft Worldwide, where he ultimately served as Executive Vice President, Executive Creative Director. In 1999, they had $988M in sales. Shlopak resigned in 1999 to join Louis Marx in an investment firm Equity Enterprises (later Brae Capital). Patrick Brady, who had joined the company in 1989 as a 50% owner of the then privately held company and was, in 1999, already president, was named CEO. At the end of that year, Yucaipa Companies with a $25 million investment, became a substantial-enough owner to replace Patrick Brady as chairman with its own Ronald Burkle. However Patrick and Simon CEO Allan Brown were named as "co-chief executives" of Cyrk.

In late 1999, with the company's share price still well below the intrinsic value of the company, the board of directors launched a strategic initiative with DLJ (Donaldson, Lufkin & Jenrette later CS First Boston) intended to maximize its share price through a plan that would divest certain legacy accounts and certain businesses acquired previously. The plan was consummated in the spring of 2001. In October 2000, the company is described as consisting "... primarily of the Cyrk promotional products operation in Gloucester, the Los Angeles-based Simon Marketing ... and a newly formed Internet division ...." In the June 2001 and upon the successful conclusion of its strategic initiatives, Patrick Brady, EVP-CFO Dominic Mammola and Exec VP Ted Axelrod, all resigned. In or around May 2001, the company split into two pieces. The Corporate Promotions Group was sold "once worth $147 million, for a mere $14 million to investment group Rockridge Partners, Inc.", an investor group led by Gemini Investors, LLC. and the Cyrk name along with that. "Bob Siemering, a principal with Rockridge Partners, was COO of Marketing Incentives", a company acquired by Cyrk in 1998. Siemering became the CEO of the new company The remainder of the company changed its name to Simon Worldwide.

== Fall ==
With the Simon Marketing entity as the principal remaining business in the wake of the earlier divestitures, the enormous reliance on income from McDonald's proved disastrously short-sighted when McDonald's Monopoly Best Chance Game turned out to have been rigged fraudulently by Jerome P. Jacobson, the security officer at then-Cyrk-subsidiary Simon Marketing. Although arrests were announced on 22 August 2001, with convictions following, and only one Cyrk/Simon employee was charged, this did not stop McDonald's from voiding its agreement. Phillip Morris quickly followed suit, thereby together removing more than 70% of Simon Worldwide's revenue.

The fallout erased the benefits of the strategic divestitures and severely hurt the remaining business of Simon Worldwide; Ronald Burkle resigned from the board, and fourteen executives left to join Draft Worldwide (later called FCB) in Chicago, part of the Interpublic Group, in forming a new unit called Premium Surge within their promotional marketing division Surge. Although initially maintaining an amicable relationship, there were still several unresolved issues between Cyrk and Simon. In May 2002, Simon Worldwide went into liquidation.

The Massachusetts-based portion had evidently been sold. On May 20, 2003, PPB Magazine reported that under new owners Sun Capital Partners, Inc., Gary Vonk had replaced Bob Siemering as CEO of Cyrk. In November 2004, Cyrk, now based in Monroe, Washington appointed Alan Patrick as CEO. Patrick quickly returned Cyrk to a break even position and with the company poised for future growth, increased the client list with the addition of GM, developed Caterpillar's new direct-to-consumer website, winning Cat's Platinum Licensee of the Year Award in 2005 and 2006 and managed an acquisition of a European and Asian subsidiary company. Alan Patrick, Cyrk CEO, left the company by mutual agreement in late 2007 to pursue other business interests back on the US's east coast.

Following that, Cyrk introduced Jeffrey Werner as CEO and in January 2008 welcomed Frank Bakirdan as VP of Global Sales. At the same time, Cyrk's financial statements indicate that the cash benefits of layoffs and withheld supplier payments, instituted first by interim leadership and then continued by Werner. As Werner and Bakirdan attempted to formulate their own strategy, further layoffs were executed in a desperate attempt to conserve cash. By the end of October 2008, the bottom fell out of consumer confidence, and sales volumes fell further. Cyrk was forced in November 2008 to release all unessential personnel as well as global sales staff in an attempt to reduce costs, and to sell all business units and assets.

On January 22, 2009, an auction held at Cyrk's headquarters liquidated the company's assets.

Meanwhile, Simon Worldwide was still being traded as late as 2009 as OTCQB: SWWI on pink sheets.
