= Fresh & Easy =

Former chain of grocery stores in the western United States

Fresh & Easy Neighborhood Market Inc.
- Type: Subsidiary
- Industry: Retailing
- Founded: January 2007; 19 years ago
- Defunct: October 23, 2015
- Fate: Liquidation sale Bankruptcy
- Headquarters: El Segundo, California
- Area served: Arizona, California, Nevada
- Key people: Jim Keyes (CEO)
- Products: Groceries; General Merchandise
- Parent: Tesco (2007–2013)
- Website: web.archive.org/web/20120313111146/http://www.freshandeasy.com/ (Archived)

Fresh & Easy Neighborhood Market Inc. was a chain of grocery stores in the Western United States, headquartered in El Segundo, California. It was a subsidiary of Tesco, the world's third largest retailer, based in the United Kingdom, until November 2013 when it was purchased by Yucaipa Companies. It had plans for rapid growth – the first stores opened in November 2007 and, after a pause in the second quarter of 2008, the opening program recommenced. While there were over 200 stores in Arizona, California, and Nevada by December 2012, Tesco confirmed in April 2013 that it was pulling out of the US market, at a reported cost of £1.2 billion. On September 10, 2013, Tesco announced they were transferring ownership and operations of more than 150 stores to supermarket-owner Ron Burkle's Yucaipa Companies group. At the beginning of October 2013, Fresh & Easy filed for Chapter 11 bankruptcy in U.S. bankruptcy court. The sale cost Tesco £150m, taking the total cost of its failed US venture to nearly £2bn. On October 23, 2015, Yucaipa announced that it would close all Fresh & Easy stores.

On October 30, 2015, Fresh & Easy filed for Chapter 11 bankruptcy for the second time in two years.

== History ==
On February 9, 2006, Tesco announced that it planned to move into the United States by opening a chain of small format grocery stores in three Western states (Arizona, California and Nevada) in 2007 named Fresh & Easy. The initial planned capital expenditure was up to £250m ($436m) per year. After Tesco CEO Terry Leahy announced serious resources had been committed to developing a format that would be popular with American consumers, investors responded with some skepticism with a small drop in the company's share price. The markets were expected to be around 1,400 square metres (15,000 sq ft)—good-sized supermarkets in many countries, but about one-third the size of an average supermarket in the US By January 2007, Tesco opened its U.S. headquarters in El Segundo, California. The company initially expanded into Southern California, Phoenix, Arizona, and Las Vegas, Nevada.

On April 21, 2009, Tesco reported a trading loss of £142m from Fresh & Easy. On October 4, 2010 Fresh & Easy announced that it was temporarily closing 13 stores because of shrinking populations, high percentage of housing foreclosures and high unemployment rates. The stores were being mothballed, with hope of reopening them when the economy improved. Six of the stores were in the Las Vegas area, six in the Phoenix area and one in Moreno Valley, California. Most of the closures were "C-level stores", doing less than $50,000 USD in weekly sales. The business was not expected to break even until 2012–13. In the Strategic Review announcement in December 2012, research was showing that the company was not going to make a profit until the end of 2013 or even 2014. An article in the Los Angeles Times estimated that the chain had experienced "about $1.2 billion in cumulative annual losses" prior to 2013.

In February 2013 it was reported that despite rumors, Tesco would not sell or close the chain. This "rumor" was based on the fact that Tesco Chief Executive Philip Clarke announced to shareholders that Tesco would close or sell Fresh & Easy.

Tesco announced the sale of the chain on September 10, 2013, to Yucaipa Companies LLC. In fact, Tesco was not so much selling the chain as "essentially paying Mr. Burkle’s Yucaipa Cos. to take on [Fresh & Easy's] liabilities" at a cost to Tesco of £150 million (approximately $235 million), while also providing the transferred chain with an £80 million loan. On November 27, 2013, the sale to Yucaipa Companies was completed. Yucaipa acquired 167 Fresh & Easy stores and closed approximately 40 of them.

In a statement delivered shortly after the news was released, Burkle confirmed there would be changes to the stores' format, "to complete Tesco’s vision ... [and] make it even more relevant to today’s consumer." In June 2014, Fresh & Easy initiated a reintroduction campaign, emphasizing affordable organics, made-on-the-premises takeout, freshness, and the avoidance of artificial colors and flavors.

In its e-mail announcing the sale, Fresh & Easy said that customers would need to re-enroll in the Fresh & Easy Friends Card Loyalty program because "California state law does not allow the transfer of personal information of Friends Rewards members to the new buyer of Fresh & Easy"; after re-enrolling, "existing points and rewards balance will be honored."

On March 22, 2015, Fresh & Easy announced that 50 of its stores would close to redeploy its money into development of an e-commerce shopping service. 30 of the stores that would close were located in California. The service, named Click & Collect, underwent testing at stores in the Las Vegas Valley in anticipation of a chainwide rollout.

=== Closure ===
On October 21, 2015, Fresh & Easy announced it was closing all of its stores. Brendan Wonnacott, a spokesman for the chain, said Fresh & Easy was starting "the process for an organized wind-down." According to Wonnacott, Fresh & Easy did not have enough cash and could not obtain financing to continue operating the business. In a Chapter 7 manner, stores would be liquidated and closed within the next few weeks. The stores began a liquidation sale on October 24, 2015, and by November 13, 2015, all of their stores were closed, along with the termination of the Friends Rewards program., marking the death of the Fresh & Easy brand.

On October 30, 2015, Fresh & Easy filed for Chapter 11 bankruptcy for the second time in two years.

After negotiations between Fresh & Easy, through their financial advisers, FTI Consulting, Inc. and Industrial Assets Corp., led by Venice Gamble (the Director of Legal & Business Development for Industrial Assets) and Nyk Westbrook (who is the Director of Business Development for Industrial Assets Corp.) for Industrial Assets Corp., and Mary Ann Kaptain (who is a Managing Director for FTI Consulting, Inc.) for Fresh & Easy, to have Industrial Assets Corp. and Maynards Industries become employed as the Auctioneer to liquidate Fresh & Easy's equipment, on November 5, 2015, Fresh & Easy filed an application for court approval to engage a liquidation company, Industrial Assets Corp. and Maynards Industries, to hold a public auction. Venice Gamble, the liquidation firm's Director of Legal & Business Development signed the Declaration in Support of Employment of the Auctioneer. (See Exhibit 1 [Page 50-55] of the Pleadings).

On November 20, 2015, the U.S. Bankruptcy Court approved the request and application to have Industrial Assets Corp. and Maynards Industries employed as the auctioneer.

On December 12, 2015, Industrial Assets Corp. and their subsidiaries, BidItUp Auctions Worldwide, together with Maynards Industries, held a public auction at Fresh & Easy's distribution center in Riverside, California, where all of Fresh & Easy's hard assets, including tractors, trailers, and other furnishings, fixtures, and equipment ("FF&E") were liquidated and sold at auction.

With all Fresh & Easy stores having closed by November 13, 2015, Home Chef (owned by Kroger) now uses the https://www.freshandeasy.com/ domain name, with Fresh & Easy no longer being an active trademark of Tesco or Yucaipa.

== Management ==
Timothy John Rollit Mason is the former President and Chief Executive Officer of Fresh & Easy. He joined Tesco in 1982 and became a member of the Board in 1995. Mason relocated to the U.S. with his family as part of the assignment of building the U.S. presence. He led the team researching the U.S. market prior to the company opening its first American store. In March 2011, Mason took on new roles as deputy chief executive and chief marketing officer within Tesco, and now spends about a third of his time outside of the US.

It was reported in December 2012 that Tim Mason had resigned from Tesco. He got a large bonus check when he resigned, totalling around £5.7 million. Most people criticized the company for giving him such a big payout despite the US stores not turning a profit.

== Stores ==
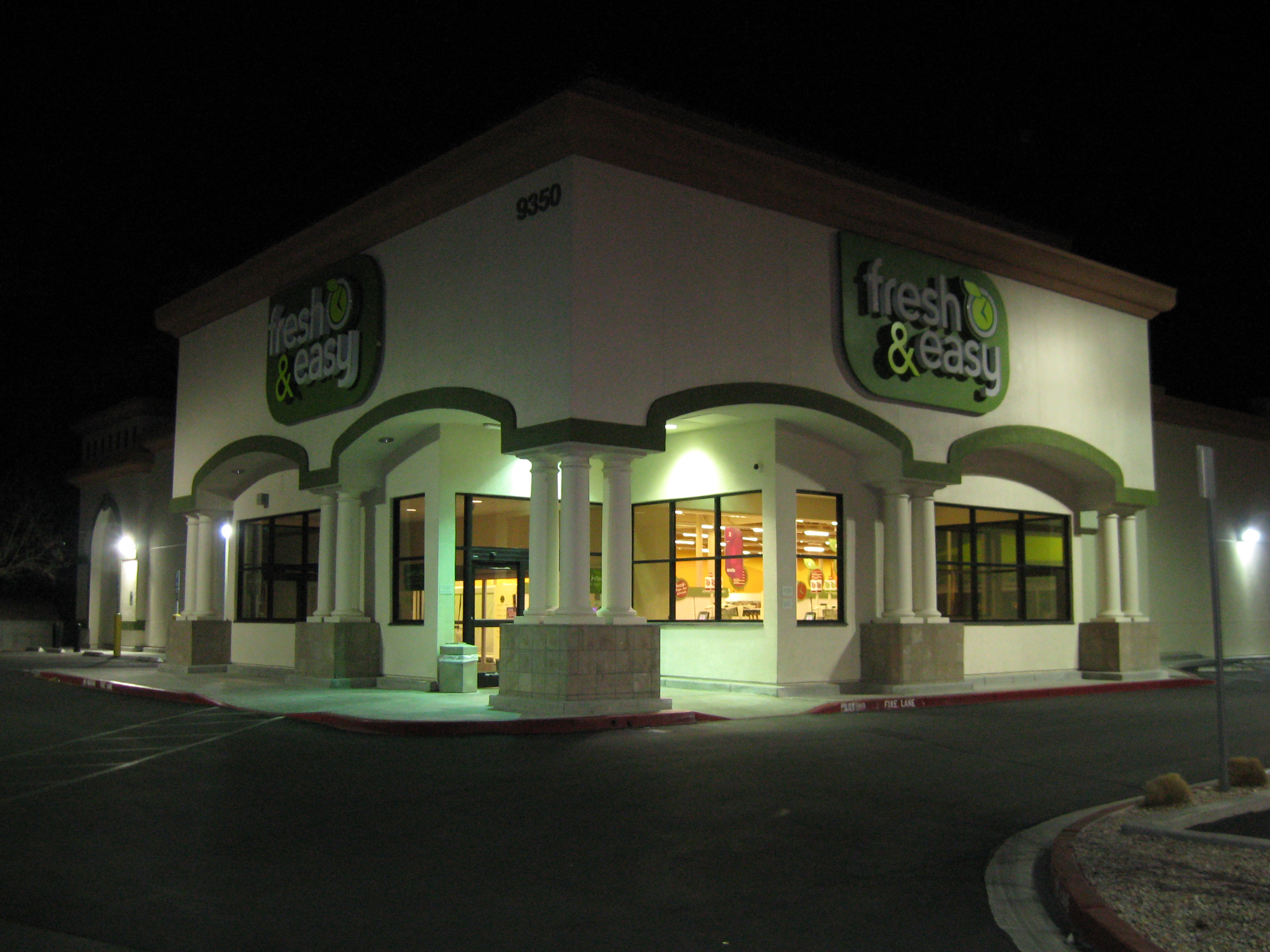
Fresh & Easy market in Las Vegas, Nevada

Fresh & Easy announced in October, 2007, that the first California and Arizona stores would open November 8. However, on November 1, 2007, Fresh & Easy opened its first store, in Hemet, California, as a "soft opening". (Soft openings are traditionally done in the retail business to test systems and store staff, and prepare for a larger "grand opening.") The Hemet store, near the company's distribution center, along with five others in Los Angeles and Orange Counties, then had their "grand opening" on November 8, 2007.

Fresh & Easy Neighborhood Market employed 20 to 30 associates per store. Part-time employees were paid a starting hourly wage of $10 USD per hour. Those store employees who work at least 20 hours per week received a health insurance plan, which they also contributed to. Assistant managers, called Team Leaders, were paid $13 hour (California). In Arizona, each of these positions were paid US$1 per hour less. From April until the end of June 2008, Fresh & Easy took a pause from opening any new stores. That hiatus was lifted with the July 2, 2008, opening of a store in Manhattan Beach, California. As of October 5, 2011, there were 182 stores in Arizona, California, and Nevada.

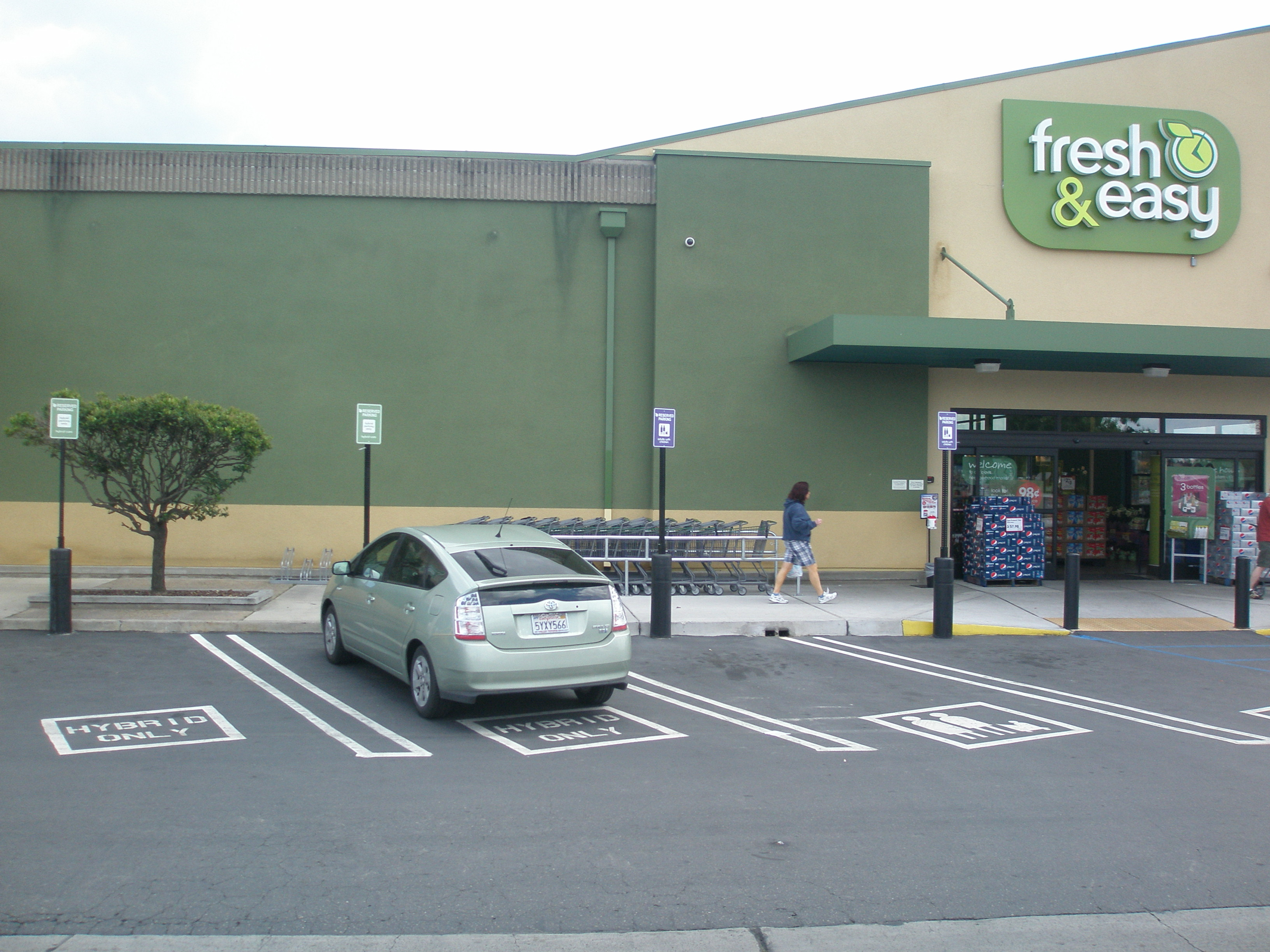
Parking spaces reserved for hybrid cars at Clovis, California store.

California

On September 8, 2010, Fresh & Easy opened 4 new stores in California, marking the 100th store for the state. By August 2011, with the first Northern California stores open, there were 128 stores operating in California. This totalled 130 after opening locations in Brentwood, California, and Antioch, California, between January and March 2012.

Arizona

In July 2007, Tesco announced plans for several Arizona stores. The first Mesa, Arizona, store opened December 5, 2007. There were (as of August 2011) 28 locations in operation in the Phoenix area.

Nevada

The first five Nevada stores opened in the Las Vegas Valley area November 11, 2007. There were 21 stores in operation in and around Las Vegas in August 2011. Many stores were opened in the locations of former Rite-Aid Pharmacies.

== Distribution centres ==
Tesco purchased a 130,000 square metres (1,400,000 sq ft) distribution centre in unincorporated Riverside County, adjacent to the cities of Riverside and Moreno Valley on land that was part of the former March Air Reserve Base. The company was seeking another distribution center location in Stockton, strategic for the Northern California region, and had considered another distribution centre in Phoenix.

On December 12, 2015, Industrial Assets Corp. and Maynards Industries held a public auction sale on behalf of the Chapter 7 Bankruptcy Estate at the Distribution Centre in Riverside, CA

== Environmental goals ==
Fresh & Easy made a commitment to building Leadership in Energy and Environmental Design certified buildings. Its food transportation trailers were hybrid electric-diesel. The company contracted for the installation of a rooftop solar power system for its Riverside distribution center, capable of generating 2.6 million kilowatt hours per year—enough to supply a fifth of the depot's power needs and prevent the emission of 1,200 tons of carbon dioxide pollution per year; the contractor believed that it would be the largest such system in the world at the time. Stores were equipped with LED lights in freezers, coolers and for outdoor signage. Some stores had reserved parking for hybrid cars.
