= Raffaello Follieri scandal =

2008 financial crimes case in the United States

This scandal involved accusations that Italian real estate developer Raffaello Follieri misappropriated an investment from Bill Clinton and billionaire Ronald Burkle meant to buy Roman Catholic churches in the United States. Follieri ultimately pleaded guilty to federal criminal charges in the U.S. and was sentenced to prison.

On July 15, 2008, Bishop Joseph Anthony Galante of the Diocese of Camden, New Jersey, was implicated in the scandal by a New York Post article titled "A Deal with the Devil" that revealed that Follieri had bought Galante's beach house for $400,000 in 2007 shortly after Galante began the study that resulted in his 2008 announcement to sell off half of the Diocese's church properties. Following disclosure of the bishop's involvement in Vati-Con, the Council of Parishes of Southern New Jersey demanded "a complete halt to the Bishop’s planned church closure program". The Galante/Follieri beach house was put back on the market in 2008 and sold almost two years later for $310,000.

On July 24, 2008, the New York Daily News reported that during a second raid of Follieri's apartment in New York City, the FBI had confiscated the private journals of Follieri's former girlfriend, American film actress Anne Hathaway, as part of their ongoing investigation into the scandal. Hathaway did not face any charges related to the scandal.

In October 2008, Follieri pleaded guilty in Manhattan to the charges, and Federal Judge John Koeltl imposed a 4½ year prison sentence. He was released on May 25, 2012, from a federal prison in Pennsylvania. The U.S. Department of Homeland Security's Immigration and Customs Enforcement deported Follieri to Italy on May 25, 2012, immediately after his release from prison. By 2018, Follieri had returned to being an investor and says he is once again on good terms with Burkle, who he said was among the group of investors helping him acquire 50 percent in the Foggia Calcio soccer club in Southern Italy.
