= Yucaipa Companies =

American private equity firm

The Yucaipa Companies, LLC
- Type: Private
- Industry: Private equity
- Founded: 1986; 40 years ago
- Founder: Ronald Burkle
- Headquarters: Los Angeles, California, United States
- Products: Leveraged buyout
- Website: yucaipaco.com

The Yucaipa Companies, LLC is an American private equity firm founded in 1986 by Ronald Burkle. It specializes in a private equity and venture capital, with a focus on middle-market companies, growth capital, industry consolidation, leveraged buyouts and turnaround investments. It generally invests $25–300 million in companies with $300–$500 million in revenues.

Yucaipa has a history of leveraged buyouts in supermarket and grocery chains, beginning with Jurgensen's Markets in 1986. After several standalone investments in the late 1980s, it went on to lead the consolidation of West Coast retail that occurred during the 1990s due in part to the rise of discount centers like Wal-Mart. In November 2013.

== History ==
=== 1986–2000 ===
In 1987, Food 4 Less grocery franchise of Kansas City was acquired for $35 million. In 1989, Boys Markets was acquired for $375 million. In 1991, Alpha Beta California supermarket chain was acquired for $271 million. In 1994, Smitty's Phoenix-based supermarket operator was acquired for $138 million. In 1994, Ralphs Grocery Co. Southern California supermarket chain was acquired for $1.5 billion; Alpha Beta and Boys outlets subsequently were then rebranded as Ralphs In 1997, Ralphs/Food 4 Less merged with Fred Meyer. The following year Fred Meyer sold to Kroger for $8 billion. In 1995, Dominick's, a Chicago-based grocery store chain, was acquired for $750 million. In 1998, Dominick's sold for $1.85 billion to Safeway. In 1999, Yucaipa invested $3 million in GameSpy, and $25 million in Cyrk, Inc.

=== 2000–present ===
In 2004, TDS Logistics was purchased by Yucaipa. Later that year, Yucaipa along with Piccadily Restaurant Investment Group, LLC formed a special purpose entity by Ramy El-Batrawi to acquire Piccadilly Restaurants. In 2005, Yucaipa became the majority shareholder in Aloha Airlines through a $100 million bid to purchase the airline In 2005, the company acquired a 40% stake in Pathmark for $150 million. In 2007, it acquired stake in The Great Atlantic & Pacific Tea Company as part of GA&P's acquisition of Pathmark. In 2008, it acquired stake in Barnes & Noble. In 2009, Yucaipa doubled its stake in Barnes & Noble to 16.8% during e-reader war with Amazon.com, citing corporate governance concerns. In 2012, divested Barnes & Noble shares to Yucaipa investors. In 2011, increases stake in The Great Atlantic & Pacific Tea Company as part of a restructuring following its bankruptcy. In 2012, the company acquired a stake in Barneys New York. In 2014, it acquired Fresh & Easy from Tesco. In 2020, the company made a "major" investment in Agency for the Performing Arts (APA), an American talent agency.

=== Aloha Airlines purchase ===
In February 2006, Aloha Airlines was taken into private ownership by Yucaipa Companies and Aloha Investment Group, LLC head by Ramy El-Batrawi. After 61 years in business, passenger operations shut down on March 31, 2008, due to rising fuel prices, new competition for inter-island travel, a tightening credit market, and dwindling interest by investors in the airline industry. Ramy El-Batrawi died of undisclosed causes on April 23, 2024

In January 2011, Yucaipa won federal Bankruptcy Court approval to buy the Aloha name and other intellectual property for $1.5 million with a stipulation that it not resell the name to Mesa Air Group, the parent of go! Mokulele. It was unknown what the plans were for the Aloha name.

Caught in the pink slime controversy and with interim chief executive Ron Allen citing "ongoing media attention" that has "dramatically reduced the demand for all ground beef products" in 2012, Yucaipa's AFA declared Chapter 11 bankruptcy. Based in King of Prussia, Pennsylvania, AFA at the time the controversy broke had about 850 employees and annual revenues of $958 million.

== Controversy ==
Former U.S. President Bill Clinton, a close friend of founder Ron Burkle, was an advisor to Yucaipa. From 2003 to 2006, Bill and Hillary Clinton's tax returns show total Yucaipa partnership income of $12.5 million. According to the 2007 summary provided by Hillary Clinton's presidential campaign, the Clintons earned $2.75 million from the Yucaipa partnership.
