= Ralphs =

American supermarket chain owned by Kroger

Ralphs Grocery Company

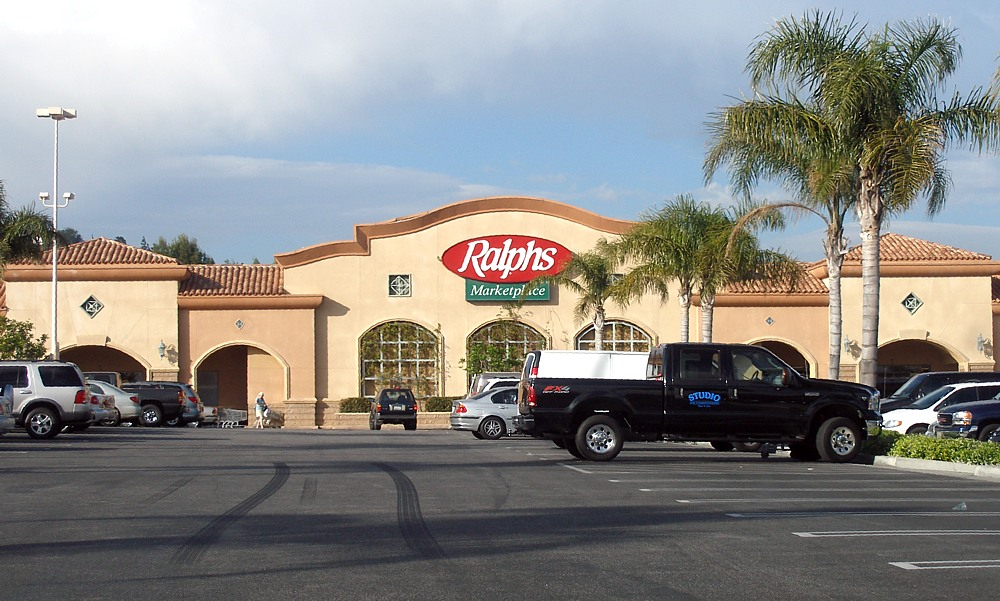
- A Ralphs Marketplace in Porter Ranch, Los Angeles, California (Store #703-00127, which became a Ralphs Fresh Fare in the 2010s)
- Type: Subsidiary
- Industry: Retail (Supermarket)
- Founded: 1873; 153 years ago in Los Angeles, California, U.S.
- Founder: George Ralphs
- Headquarters: 1100 West Artesia Boulevard Compton, California, U.S.
- Number of locations: 187 stores (2026)
- Area served: Southern California
- Key people: Kendra Doyel (president) Josh Fulton (VP of Operations) John Sparkenbach (VP of Merchandising)
- Products: Bakery, dairy, delicatessen, frozen foods, general grocery, liquor, lottery, meats, pharmacy, produce, seafood and snacks
- Services: Supermarket and pharmacy
- Revenue: US$6 billion (2023)
- Owner: Yucaipa Companies (1994–1997)
- Number of employees: 27,000 (2021)
- Parent: Federated Department Stores (1968–1992); Fred Meyer (1997–1998); Kroger (1998–present)
- Website: www.ralphs.com

Ralphs is an American supermarket chain in Southern California. The largest subsidiary of Cincinnati-based Kroger, it is the oldest such chain west of the Mississippi River.

Kroger also operates stores under the Food 4 Less and Foods Co. names in California.

== History ==
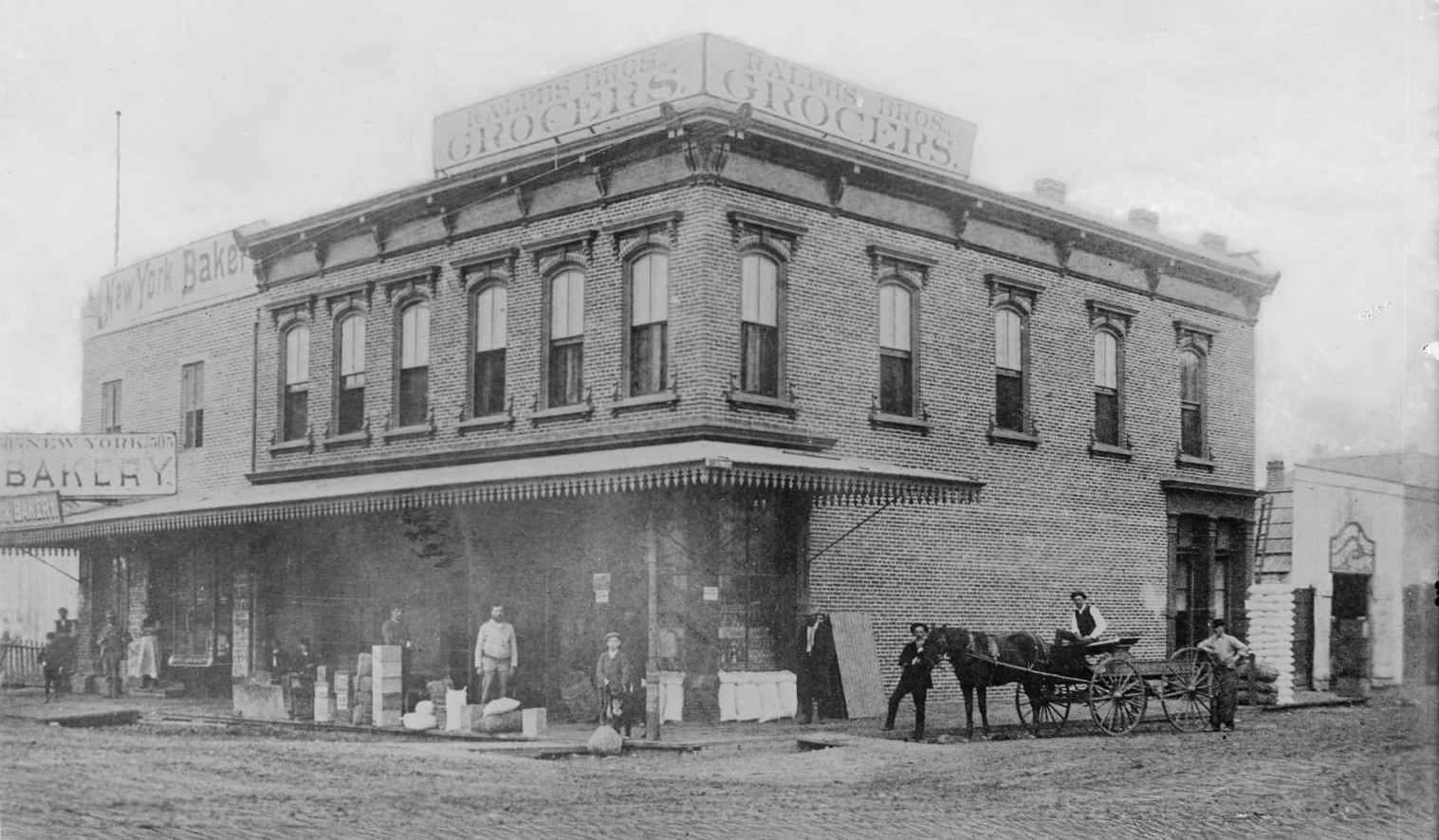
Ralphs Brothers Grocery and New York Bakery, southwest corner of Sixth Street and Spring Street, 1886

Ralphs Grocery Company was founded in 1873 in Los Angeles by George Albert Ralphs and his brother, Walter Benjamin Ralphs. Ralphs teamed with S. A. Francis in 1873 to open the Ralphs & Francis store at 5th and Hill – an area which would become the Historic Core of the city in the early 20th century, but was then a mostly residential area with many single-family houses. In 1875, Ralphs’s brother Walter bought out Francis’s share, and the business became the Ralphs Bros. Grocers, specializing in produce. The business boomed. In 1876, they constructed a two-story building at the southwest corner of Sixth and Spring.

In the 20th century, Ralphs became a grocery pioneer, offering self-service markets with checkout stands in distributed locations. The company employed notable architects in designing its stores, and the former Ralphs Grocery Store building built in 1929 in Westwood Village has been photographed by Ansel Adams, declared a Historic Cultural Monument, and listed on the National Register of Historic Places. In the 1980s, it created a chain of hybrid supermarket/warehouse stores called The Giant, which failed, but the concept returned with the company's merger with the Food 4 Less discount chain. In 1968, Ralphs was acquired by Federated Department Stores, based in Cincinnati.

In 1988, Canada-based Campeau Corporation launched a $4.2 billion hostile takeover of Federated, Ralphs's parent. Ralphs would then be put up for sale, with American Stores (owner of rival chain Lucky) making an offer.

In 1992, Federated, now known as Macy's, Inc., sold Ralphs to a group of owners, led by Edward J. DeBartolo Corporation, after filing for bankruptcy two years earlier in 1990. In 1994, Ralphs was acquired by the Yucaipa Companies for $1.5 billion. Yucaipa owned ABC Markets, Alpha Beta, Boys Markets, and Cala Foods. Soon, all ABC Markets, Alpha Betas, and Boys Markets were rebranded as Ralphs. At the same time, Food 4 Less was merged with Ralphs. In 1997, Yucaipa sold Ralphs to Portland-based Fred Meyer, owner of several chains in the west. Soon, Ralphs Marketplace stores started opening in suburban areas; these stores are based on the Fred Meyer model but without apparel. At the same time, they also acquired the 57-store Hughes Family Markets chain. In October 1998, the parent company, Fred Meyer, merged with Kroger of Cincinnati, Ohio.

In 1999, Ralphs purchased about 30 Albertsons and Lucky stores, mostly in Northern California, as well as stores in the Central Coast region, and one store each in Bakersfield and Laguna Beach. The stores were divested as a result of the Albertsons and American Stores merger and marked the chain's reentry into Northern California after a short-lived expansion in the 1970s.

In 2005, Ralphs exited the Bakersfield market, closing 3 stores.

Ralphs operated in Northern California until January 2006, when they announced that all but one Ralphs in northern California would close. In August 2006, the one remaining Ralphs in northern California, in Grass Valley, was given a 60-day notice of closure, ending Ralphs' presence in northern California for the second time. Also, in August 2006, Ralphs finalized plans to sell eleven (of thirteen remaining) Cala-Bell Stores to Harley DeLano, who previously ran the chain.

On July 20, 2007, Ralphs opened a new 50,000-square-foot (4,600 m^{2}) store on 9th and Hope Street in the South Park neighborhood of downtown Los Angeles. This was the first full-run supermarket downtown in 50 years. In 1950, Ralphs closed a store at 7th Street and Figueroa Street.

In 2024, Ralphs president Tom Schwilke announced plans to open a new Ralphs store within the next two years, the first new store opening in over 10 years.

In 2026, Tom Schwilke, president of the Ralphs Division, announced his plans to retire after seven years with Kroger. Kendra Doyel, president of the Food 4 Less/Foods Co Division, was announced as his successor.

Ralphs competes with chains Albertsons (including Vons/Pavilions), Stater Bros., Trader Joe's and Smart & Final in the Southern California grocery sphere. Its slogan is "Fresh for Everyone", also used by all other Kroger grocery store brands. Ralphs is the current market share leader in Southern California.

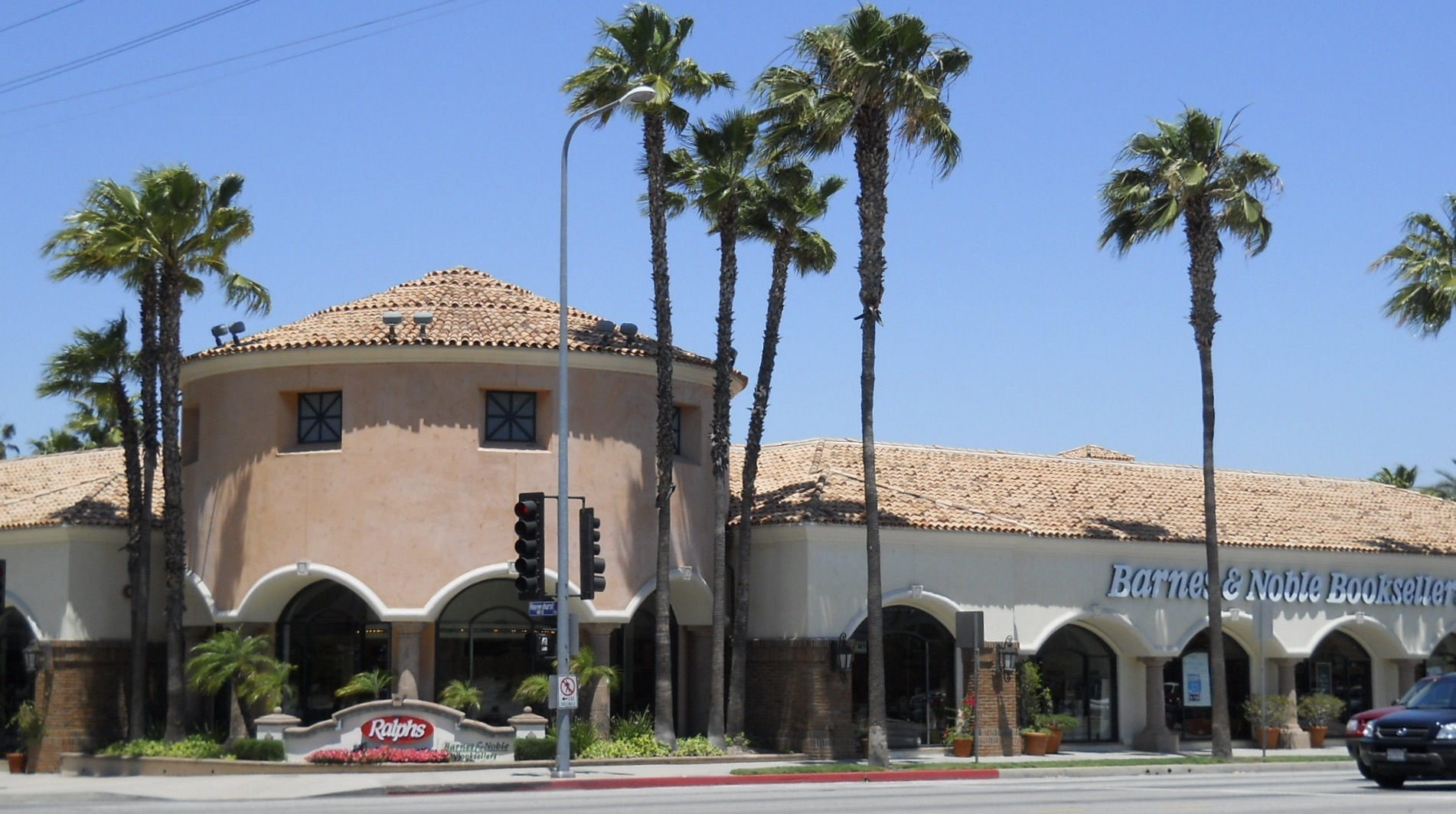
Exterior of a Ralphs store in Encino, Los Angeles which closed in January 2020 (Store #219)

== 2003–04 strike ==
Ralphs Grocery Company has contracts with the United Food and Commercial Workers, the largest grocery union in the United States. In late 2003 and early 2004, Ralphs locked out its workers who were members of the UFCW in sympathy with competitor Vons (owned by Safeway) in Southern California, after the UFCW had declared a strike against Vons. The issues in contract negotiations included healthcare benefits and wage structure, which the supermarkets contended were necessary to reduce costs and remain competitive in the face of the rise of discount chains like Walmart. In March 2004, the strike ended with a settlement regarded as a victory for the grocery chains—new hires would be on a much lower pay scale than existing workers and receive less generous health benefits.

On October 16, 2006, Ralphs agreed to pay $70 million to settle felony charges that it illegally rehired locked out employees using false names and Social Security numbers during the strike. Eligible UFCW members received $50 million of the settlement and the remainder was paid in fines to the federal government.
