= Mangione family of Maryland =

American family

The Mangione family are a prominent family in Maryland, active in business, philanthropy, and politics. The founder of the family business dynasty was Nicholas Mangione, a businessman active in real estate, healthcare, and radio. Nicholas Mangione's descendants remain active in Maryland business and politics. Louis Mangione has inherited the role as head of Mangione Family Enterprises, following the death of his father Nicholas. Nicholas's grandson Nino Mangione is a former member of the Maryland House of Delegates, his grandson Peter Mangione is a professional soccer player, and his grandson Luigi Mangione pleaded guilty to shooting and killing Brian Thompson.

== Family tree ==
- Nicholas Mangione (1925–2008) m. Maria Villano (1898–1964)
  - Louis Mangione m. Kathleen
    - Luigi Mangione (b. 1998)
  - Nick Mangione m. Danielle
    - Nino Mangione (b. 1987)

== Business ==
The Mangione family owned several country clubs, including the Hayfields Country Club and the Turf Valley golf course in Ellicott City, Maryland, was first purchased by Nicholas and Mary Mangione in 1978. The Mangione family maintains ownership of the resort, which was managed by Peter Mangione as of 2024.

== Philanthropy ==
In 1993 and 1996, the Baltimore Committee for Shaare Zedek Medical Center in Jerusalem honored Nicholas and Mary Mangione for their philanthropic activities. In 1994 and 1995, the Mangiones served as chairs and honorary chairs on the board of the committee. They were supporters of the State of Israel and traveled to the country as part of their appreciation for the accomplishments of the Israeli state.

The Mangione family were major donors to the Catholic Church in Maryland, donating millions of dollars to Catholic schools, ministries, and parishes. In 2012, the Mangione family donated a heritage edition of The Saint John's Bible to the Basilica of the National Shrine of the Assumption of the Blessed Virgin Mary in Baltimore.

Nicholas Mangione's widow Mary C. Mangione engaged in philanthropic activities as a music patron and hospital benefactor. She supported a variety of institutions, including the Greater Baltimore Medical Center, the Baltimore Opera Company, and the Walters Art Museum, where she was a trustee of the museum.

Howard Community College has recognized the Mangione family for their support and has maintained ties with Turf Valley through an endowment that helps Turf Valley employees attend the college.

As of 2022, the Mangione Family Foundation had assets worth $4.4 million dollars.

On August 14, 2026, Luigi Mangione pleaded guilty to federal stalking charges and admitted to killing Brian Thompson, former CEO of UnitedHealthcare.

== Politics ==
The Mangione family has ties to the conservative movement and the Maryland Republican Party. The Mangione family has owned several conservative talk radio stations. Nino Mangione is a radio host and conservative Republican.

== See also ==
- History of Maryland
