= Mangione =

- Pronunciation: Italian: [manˈdʒoːne]

Origin
- Language: Italian
- Meaning: 'someone who eats a lot'
- Region of origin: Italy

Other names
- Variant forms: Mangioni, Mangion

Mangione is an Italian surname meaning 'someone who eats a lot', from the verb mangiare. The name is common in southern Italy, primarily in Apulia and Sicily.

== People ==
- Alice Mangione (born 1997), Italian sprinter
- Angelo Mangione (born 2007), Italian taekwondo practitioner
- Francesco Mangione (born 1957), Italian-Australian convicted murderer
- Giuseppe Mangione (1908–1976), Italian screenwriter
- Mike Mangione, American singer-songwriter, guitarist and percussionist
- Salvatore "Salvo" Mangione (1947–2015), Italian artist
- Stéphane Mangione (born 1979), French football player and coach
- Yves Mangione (born 1964), French football player

=== Families ===
- Mangione family of New York:
  - Chuck Mangione (1940–2025), American flugelhorn player, trumpeter and composer
  - Gap Mangione (born 1938), American jazz pianist, composer, arranger, and bandleader
  - Jerre Mangione (1909–1998), American writer and scholar of the Sicilian-American experience
- Mangione family of Maryland:
  - Luigi Mangione (born 1998), American suspect in the killing of UnitedHealthcare CEO Brian Thompson
  - Nicholas Mangione (1925–2008), American businessman
  - Nino Mangione (born 1987), American politician
  - Peter Mangione (born 2001), American soccer player
