= Tom Marr =

American radio host (1942–2016)

Marr

Thomas Aquinas Marr (October 17, 1942 – July 7, 2016) was an American talk radio host on WCBM (680-AM) in Baltimore, Maryland, known for his conservative political views. He spent nearly 20 years as a newsman and sportscaster, including eight seasons as a radio play-by-play broadcaster for the Baltimore Orioles before he embarked on a trail blazing political talk-radio career. His full broadcasting career spanned close to fifty years, mostly in Baltimore, although he worked in other major markets, including Washington, D.C., Philadelphia, and New York City.

== Early life and education ==
Marr's broadcasting career began while still in high school, hosting a high school sports show on WWDC in Washington, D.C., in 1960. After graduating from Montgomery Blair High School in Silver Spring, Maryland, Marr served in the United States Marine Corps until being discharged in 1963.

== Career ==
=== Radio career ===
After his discharge from the U.S. Marine Corps, Marr worked for radio stations in Rhode Island and Salisbury, Maryland and then at WTAR in Norfolk, Virginia.

==== Baltimore ====
In 1967, Marr became a news anchor and reporter for the former WFBR (1300 AM) in Baltimore, and was later named the station's news director. He was also as a featured panelist on the station's award-winning political call-in show Conference Call.

From 1967 to 1975, Marr covered Baltimore's professional sports teams, including the Baltimore Orioles, Baltimore Colts, and Baltimore Bullets for CBS Radio News on their national sportscasts. He supplied the network with more than 150 reports a year including coverage from Super Bowls III and V, the 1969, 1970, and 1971 World Series, and the 1971 NBA Finals. In 1971, Marr broadcast the play-by-play for six Orioles exhibition games against Japanese baseball teams as part of a goodwill trip to Japan. While serving as WFBR's news director and morning drive-time news anchor, Marr also spent three years from 1976 to 1979 as the weekend sports anchor on Baltimore's WMAR-TV (Channel 2).

From 1979 to 1986, Marr was a radio play-by-play broadcaster for the Baltimore Orioles on the team's flagship station WFBR, calling the play-by-play in the 1979 and 1983 World Series, and the exhibition games during another goodwill trip to Japan in 1984. After the 1986 season, the Orioles' broadcast rights went to another station, and Tom utilized his roots as a newsman and political commentator to embark in what would ultimately evolve into a groundbreaking 30-year career in talk radio. In addition to his weekday WFBR talk-show, Marr was hired by WWDB (FM) in Philadelphia in 1987 to host a similar political talk radio show on Saturday nights, which he hosted for seven years before going to work full time for WWDB in 1995.

In 1988, WFBR was sold, and by August of that year the new owners dismissed all of the station's on-air personnel while changing the format from news/talk to oldies rock and roll from the 1950s and early 1960s. At about the same time, rival station WCBM Radio (680-AM) filed for bankruptcy, went silent shortly thereafter, and was put up for sale. In October 1988, WCBM returned to the airwaves under new ownership when Baltimore businessman Nick Mangione, Sr. purchased the station and resurrected it from bankruptcy. Mangione was an avid listener of talk radio and had been a fan of the WFBR's news/talk programming that was discontinued under its new ownership. So once he acquired WCBM, Mangione hired Marr, along with most of the other displaced talk show hosts and news anchors from WFBR to replicate the same format and mostly the same program line-up on WCBM.

==== Philadelphia ====
Marr stayed at WCBM until 1995 when he was offered a full-time weekday show on Philadelphia's WWDB-FM, where he had been hosting a Saturday evening show since 1987. Marr returned to WCBM in 1997 when they offered him a long-term contract to return. Marr cited displeasure with WWDB's programming structure which devoted too much time to commercials, traffic reports, and news updates each hour, along with an ownership that pressured him to avoid hot-button political issues in favor of more light-hearted topics, such as "pizza toppings." Marr had always been a staple on WCBM's talk-radio line-up, and after returning to the station in 1997, his show was the station's lead-in program to the Rush Limbaugh Show.

==== New York City ====
Marr was frequently called on to do fill-in work for nationally syndicated radio hosts such as Bob Grant, which helped lead to Marr's own nationally syndicated weeknight show on the WOR Radio Network in New York City. Marr made frequent television appearances on Fox News, CNN, MSNBC, and C-SPAN. He also routinely filled in for host Mark Levin on the nationally syndicated The Mark Levin Show, and for Lou Dobbs' nationally syndicated program on the United Stations Radio Networks.

As a newsman, sportscaster, and talk show host, Marr has covered events all over the world. On two separate occasions in 1971 and 1984, Marr broadcast Baltimore Orioles exhibition games on the team's goodwill trips in Japan. His show broadcast internationally, including seven times from Israel and from Taiwan, Glasgow and Edinburgh in Scotland, and Bosnia. In July 2006, he spent three weeks with Coalition Forces in Iraq, Kuwait, and Qatar while covering the Iraq War. That same year, he also broadcast from Guantanamo Bay in Cuba. During his career, he broadcast from other international locations, including Great Britain, Germany, Ireland, Belgium, South Africa, China, and the former Soviet Union.

Marr was consistently ranked by Talkers Magazine as one of the most influential talk show hosts in the United States as part of their "Heavy Hundred" list. At the time of Marr's death, TALKER'S publisher Michael Harrison issued the following statement: "All of us at TALKERS are devastated over the loss of our dear friend and broadcasting treasure, Tom Marr. Tom was one of the true greats and a perennial member of the Heavy Hundred. His accomplishments in radio go back well before the modern era of talk radio that he played such an important role in building. He was an outstanding, kind, compassionate man who cared deeply about his fellow human beings – qualities that he brought to the airwaves day-after-day, decade-after-decade. The radio industry has lost one of its greatest players."

Marr had an extensive radio and television background in both news and sports. As a newsman, he broke several stories that received national attention and twice appeared on the CBS Evening News with Walter Cronkite.

In addition to broadcasting, Marr was an avid traveler with a lifelong interest and passion in aviation. He was twice appointed as a commissioner on the Maryland Aviation Administration, first by Governor Bob Ehrlich, in 2003, and again by Governor Larry Hogan in 2015.

== Death ==
Marr died on July 7, 2016 at age 73 following a stroke that was a result of spine surgery. He was the father of five children, ten grandchildren, and had been married for over 50 years at the time of his death.
