= Kevin Ford =

Kevin Ford may refer to:

- Kevin A. Ford (born 1960), U.S. astronaut
- Kevin Ford (boxer) (born 1962), retired American heavyweight boxer
- Kevin Ford (mathematician) (born 1967), American mathematician
- Kevin Ford (Maryland politician), member of the Maryland Senate
- Kevin Ford (Mississippi politician) (born 1979), member of the Mississippi House of Representatives
- Kevin Ford, a fictional character, codename Wither, appearing in Marvel Comics
- Kevin Ford, real name of drum and bass producer DJ Hype
