= Mangone (surname) =

Mangone is an Italian surname. Notable people with the surname include:

- Amedeo Mangone (born 1968), Italian football coach
- Fabio Mangone (1587–1629), Italian architect
- Giovanni Mangone (late 1400s–1543), Italian artist
- Jason Mangone, American college football coach

== See also ==
- Albert Mangonès (1917–2002), Haitian architect
- Mangione, surname
