= Lorien Health Services =

Maryland USA healthcare company

Lorien Health Services is an eldercare services company based in Maryland that operates over a dozen facilities. Lorien Health Services is formally incorporated as Maryland Health Enterprises, Inc.

== History ==
Lorien Health Services was founded by Baltimore area businessman Nicholas Mangione in 1977 as a family owned business.

In the 2010s, Lorien Health Services announced that they were making efforts to improve services for underserved populations, including by opening a specialized unit that caters to the Korean-American community in Howard County, Maryland.

On June 6, 2020, Lorien Health Services was the victim of a ransomware attack that breached the private information of 47,754 individuals.

In 2024, Lorien Health Services agreed to pay $55,192.31 for alleged violations of the Civil Monetary Penalties Law.

As of 2024, Lorien Health Systems operates nine community-focused Maryland facilities including several assisted-living and nursing homes.
