= David Force Natural Resource Area =

Wildlife area in Ellicott City, Maryland

Coordinates: 39°28′59″N 76°54′16″W

The David Force Natural Resource Area is a 221-acre (89 ha) wildlife area in Ellicott City, Maryland. It is located between Route 70 and 40 adjacent to the Turf Valley development in Howard County, Maryland, and operated by the Howard County Department of Recreation and Parks.

The resource area was created to protect water quality, provide habitat for wildlife, and support recreational hiking and nature observation purposes. Part of the area has been identified for a future 36-acre David Force Park to be developed in the 2028 – 2032 time frame at an estimated cost of $6 million.

The area is named after David W. Force (1909–1966), a founder of Force and Christhill construction and former Howard County judge who made national headlines for sentencing an African American to lashings in 1951, and later a county commissioner who ran on a slow growth platform in 1962 who was one of three that approved the development of Columbia for The Rouse Company.
