= Luigi: The Musical =

2025 satirical musical

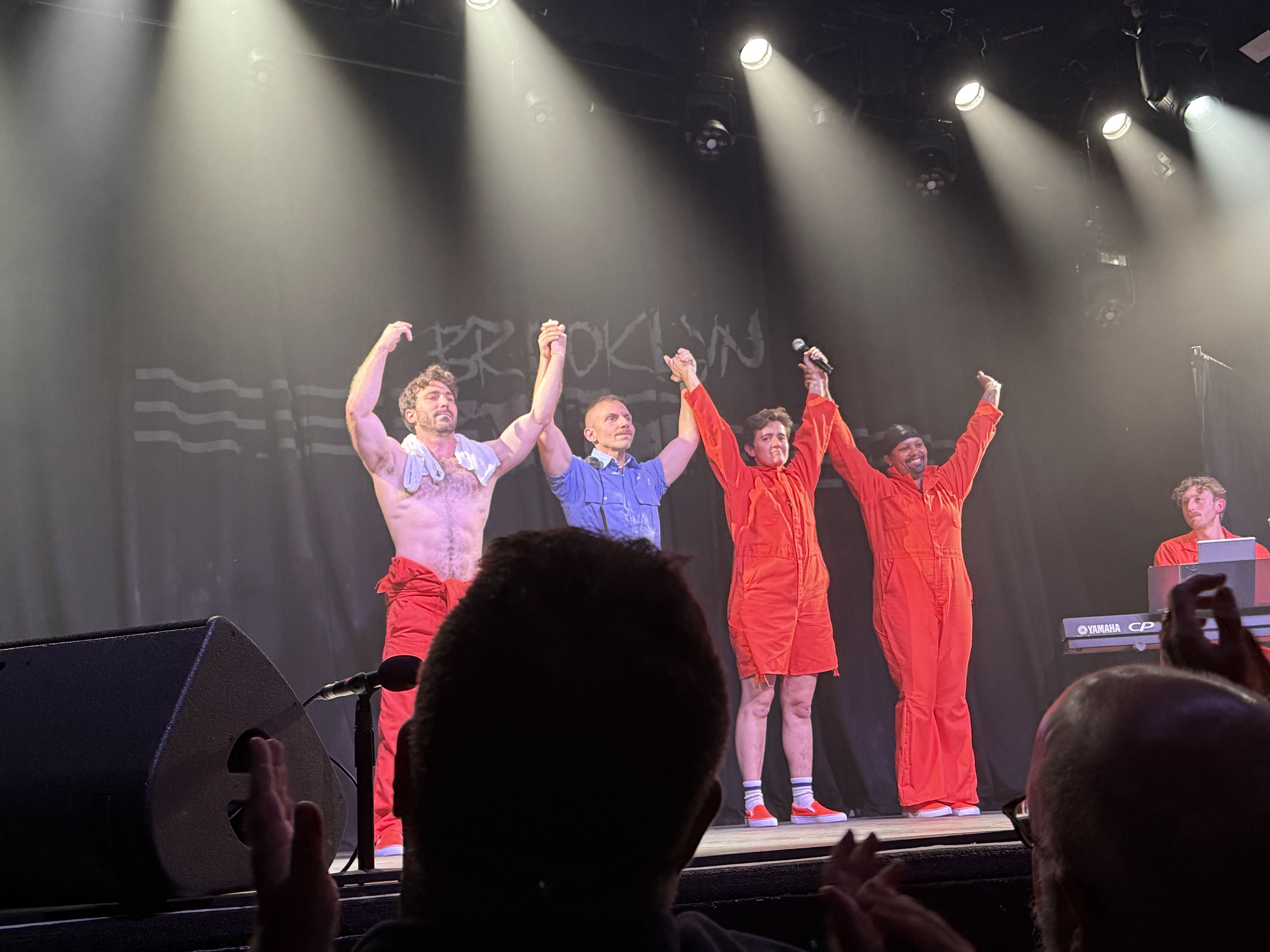
- The cast of "Luigi: The Musical" (Jonny Stein, Caleb Zeringue, André Margatini, and Janeé Lucas) standing for curtain call.
- Music: Arielle Johnson
- Lyrics: Arielle Johnson; Nova Bradford
- Premiere: June 13, 2025: Taylor Street Theater, San Francisco
- Productions: 2025 San Francisco; 2025 Edinburgh Festival Fringe; 2026 New York City Reading

Luigi: The Musical is a satirical comedy musical written by Arielle Johnson and Nova Bradford. It centers around three high-profile inmates, Luigi Mangione, Sam Bankman-Fried and Sean "Diddy" Combs who are inmates at the Metropolitan Detention Center.

The musical premiered in June 2025 at Taylor Street Theatre in San Francisco. The show originally ran from June 13–28, 2025. The initial five-show run was sold out, with additional performances later added at the Independent, a larger venue also in San Francisco, which were also sold out. The musical also had a five-show run at the Edinburgh Festival Fringe from August 19 to 23, 2025.

== Background ==
On December 4, 2024, Brian Thompson, the then CEO of UnitedHealthcare was shot and killed in New York City. American man Luigi Mangione is currently the top suspect in Thompson's killing.

The musical was conceived a few months later during an open mic night at the SF Eagle, a gay bar in San Francisco. While at that bar, the show's creator and director Nova Bradford shared her idea for the musical with Caleb Zeringue, the show's co-writer and producer.

== Synopsis ==
Luigi: The Musical centers on the fictional experiences in prison, at the Metropolitan Detention Center, of Luigi Mangione, the top suspect in the killing of Brian Thompson, former CEO of UnitedHealthcare, as well as that of Sean "Diddy" Combs and Sam Bankman-Fried. After the San Francisco Chronicle panned the show, the review was added to the script as a meta joke.

== Cast recording ==
An original San Francisco cast recording of songs from Luigi: the Musical was released in August 2025. Early access to the recording was one of the perks for backers of the production's Indiegogo campaign to bring the musical to the Edinburgh Fringe Festival.

== Characters and notable casts ==
Character	San Francisco	Edinburgh	New York
Character	2025		2026
Luigi	Jonny Stein	Matthew Solomon	Mike Cefalo
SBF	André Margatini	André Margatini	André Margatini
Diddy	Janeé Lucas	Janeé Lucas	Chine Ikoro
Guard (Sgt. Delarosa)	Caleb Zeringue	Caleb Zeringue	Phillip Taratula

== Productions ==
=== San Francisco (2025) ===
Previews for the musical began on June 13, 2025, at Taylor Street Theatre in San Francisco. The show's initial five-show run was sold out several weeks before it opened.

Due to the show's popularity, an additional performance was later added at The Independent, a larger venue also in San Francisco.

On August 1, the show's run at The Independent was extended, with two additional performances being added on August 6 and August 11. Both performances were sold out. An additional show was later added on September 7.

=== Edinburgh Festival Fringe (2025) ===
Following the popularity of the production in San Francisco, Luigi: The Musical had a five-show run the Edinburgh Festival Fringe from August 19 to 23, 2025.

=== New York City Reading (2026) ===
In March 2026, it was announced that a reading of the show would be occurring at The Green Room 42 in New York City from June 15 to 18, 2026. Soon after, two additional dates were added due to high demand.

== Critical response ==
The original production of the musical received mixed reviews. Several critics panned the show for its subject matter, being produced too soon after Thompson's killing and before Mangione's trial had begun, and for not justifying the hype surrounding it. Other critics praised the production and its message, primarily surrounding healthcare in the United States.

Lily Janiak, in her review of the original production of the show for the San Francisco Chronicle, panned the musical, writing, "If only the show itself could justify the hype, bringing national attention to an often underappreciated Bay Area theater scene. Unfortunately, it just isn’t any good."

In his review of the original production for OnStage Blog, Chris Peterson criticized the show for being produced too soon, writing "No matter how you feel about the accused—whether you see him as a cautionary tale about privilege, a case study in mental illness, or just another man who allegedly snapped—building a musical comedy around him feels gross. It's too soon. The trial hasn’t even started. Families haven’t had their day in court. But sure, let’s add a kickline and call it critique."

Reviewing the original production for the website Wonder Dave, Jonah Price gave a positive review, writing "Sure, as has been pointed out, not every note may have landed cleanly—but that’s part of what made the show feel so alive. In a city like this, in a moment like now, I’m not sure perfected polish is what we need most from our art—or if it is something I was going to expect from an independent production that went from concept to opening night in mere months. I left the theater shaken and inspired."

In a positive review for The Independent, Josh Marcus, who attended the opening show, wrote "Truly excellent satire is like great delivery pizza: it should arrive right on time, nearly too hot to touch. That’s certainly the case for Luigi: the Musical..."

== Adaptations ==
=== Filmed stage production ===
One of the perks for backers who donated $50 or more to the production's 2025 Indiegogo campaign to bring the musical to the Edinburgh Fringe Festival was early access to the first official video recording of the musical. A release date for the video recording has yet to be announced.

== Controversy ==
Various news outlets have called the musical controversial and criticized it for being produced too soon after Thompson's killing and while Mangione remains a suspect in the killing.

== See also ==
- Assassins (1990)
