= Nino Mangione =

American politician (born 1987)

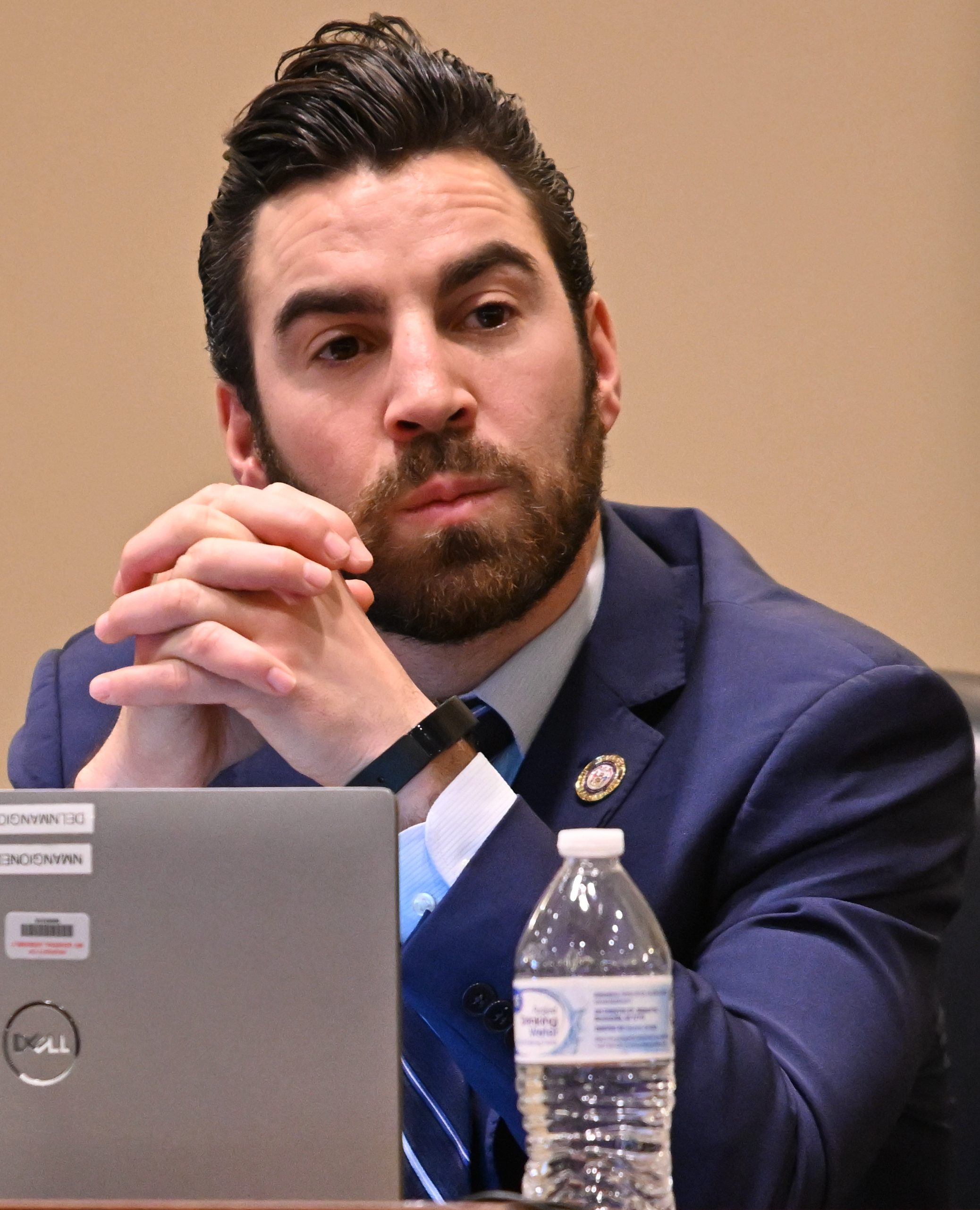
- Mangione in 2023

Member of the Baltimore County Council from the 3rd district
- Incumbent
- Assumed office June 1, 2026
- Preceded by: Wade Kach

Member of the Maryland House of Delegates
- In office January 9, 2019 – June 1, 2026
- Preceded by: Chris West
- Succeeded by: Alex Harlan
- Constituency: District 42B (2019–2023); District 42A (2023–2026)

Personal details
- Born: Antonino David Mangione; April 1, 1987 (age 39) Baltimore County, Maryland, U.S.
- Party: Republican
- Relatives: Nicholas Mangione (grandfather); Luigi Mangione (cousin); Peter Mangione (cousin)
- Education: Towson University (BA)
- Occupation: Radio personality

Antonino D. Mangione (/ˌmændʒiˈoʊni/ MAN-jee-OH-nee; born April 1, 1987) is an American politician and radio host who has been a member of the Baltimore County Council for the 3rd district since 2026. A member of the Republican Party, he served in the Maryland House of Delegates from 2019 to 2026, representing District 42B from 2019 to 2023 and District 42A from 2023 to 2026.

Mangione has described himself as a conservative Republican. In 2020, he served as a Baltimore County co-chair for the state's Trump Victory Leadership County team.

== Early life and education ==
Mangione was born in Baltimore County, Maryland, on April 1, 1987. He graduated from Calvert Hall College High School, where he played as a sweeper for the school's soccer team, and afterwards attended Towson University, where he earned a Bachelor of Arts degree in political science in 2009. After graduating, Mangione worked as an intern, and later a show host from 2017 to 2018, with WCBM 680, a talk radio station owned by his family. His family has close ties to Baltimore's Italian-American community, with his grandfather, Joseph N. Zannino Jr., having been a member of the Order Sons of Italy in America and the steering committee for the first Columbus Day national holiday celebration.

== Political career ==
In July 2017, Mangione filed to run for Maryland House of Delegates. He said that he was inspired to run for office by his late grandfather, Nicholas Mangione, a successful real estate developer who grew up in a poor Italian immigrant family. He won the general election alongside Democrat Michele Guyton with 28.6 percent of the vote.

=== Conflict of interest ===
Mangione has come under criticism for various conflicts of interest that could possibly arise from his relation with WCBM 680. While Mangione was a webmaster and a host, WCBM reposted several videos and posts advertising Mangione's campaign. The promotion from the station was not reported as in-kind contributions. Additionally, Mangione's campaign Facebook page reported that Towson University had offered a new scholarship solely for undocumented students, though according to a university spokesman it had never existed. WCBM then created a web page on its website about the scholarship, linking back to Mangione's campaign Facebook page. Mangione has stated that he does not see WCBM posts or his radio show as in-kind contributions to his campaign.

=== Maryland House of Delegates ===
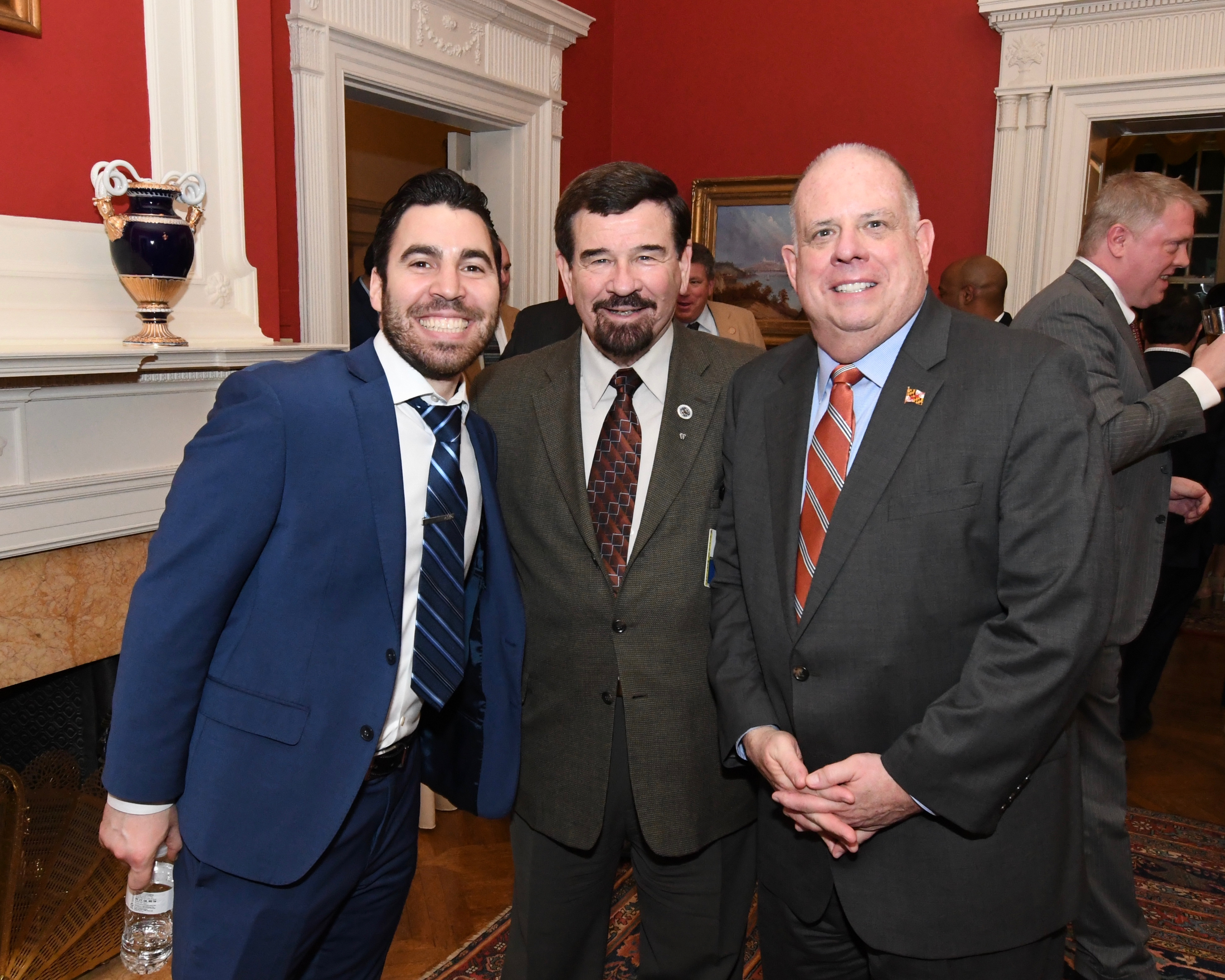
Mangione with Joseph C. Boteler III and Governor Larry Hogan at a Republican caucus reception at the Annapolis Government House, 2019

Mangione was sworn in as a member of the House of Delegates on January 9, 2019. He was a member of the Appropriations Committee from 2019 to 2025, afterwards serving on the Judiciary Committee in 2026. Mangione resigned from the House of Delegates on June 1, 2026, after being nominated to the Baltimore County Council.

=== Baltimore County Council ===
Mangione speaking at the Old Baltimore County Courthouse in Towson, Maryland, 2026

In June 2023, Mangione announced that he would run for the Maryland Senate in District 42 in 2026, challenging incumbent state senator Chris West, who later announced he would not seek re-election. Mangione later announced that he would instead run for the Baltimore County Council, seeking to succeed Wade Kach, who was retiring. During the Republican primary, he ran on a "Strong Republican Leadership" slate with Baltimore County Executive candidate Patrick Dyer and Maryland General Assembly candidates Kevin Ford, Jeff McDonald, and Chuck Murphy. Mangione won the Republican primary election on June 23, 2026, defeating riverkeeper Theaux Le Gardeur. He was defeated by Democratic nominee Shawn McIntosh in the general election.

In May 2026, after Kach suddenly resigned from the county council, Mangione applied to serve the remainder of Kach's term. The District 3 Republican Central Committee voted to appoint Mangione to the Baltimore County Council on May 30, and he was sworn in on June 1.

== Political positions ==
During his tenure in the Maryland House of Delegates, Mangione described himself as a conservative Republican. He criticized policies that he claimed has led to increased crime, added bureaucratic burdens to the state's education system, and shifted tax dollars toward "woke" social policies. Mangione has cited Donald Trump as the person he admires most both inside and outside of politics.

=== Crime ===
During his 2018 campaign, Mangione ran on creating "safe communities" by getting tough on illegal drug dealers. He introduced an amendment to legislation in the 2021 legislative session that would block people convicted as an adult for more than one murder when they were a minor from seeking reconsideration of prior life without parole sentences; his proposal was rejected in a 54–79 vote.

During the 2024 legislative session, Mangione introduced a bill that would sentence people convicted of first-degree murder to death.

During the 2026 legislative session, Mangione opposed proposals to restrict housing of children charged as adults inside adult jails, arguing that adult facilities are likely better equipped to deal with children accused of committing serious offenses.

=== Development issues ===
Mangione is a vocal critic of the Maryland Piedmont Reliability Project, a proposed 70-mile power line that would go through Baltimore, Carroll, and Frederick counties. In February 2026, he told The Baltimore Banner that he supported a 325-apartment compromise for the proposed Lutherville Station apartment complex, adding that development has taken "far too long and should have been resolved years ago". In March 2026, Mangione said he opposed moving the Urban-Rural Demarcation Line, which strictly limits development in rural parts of Baltimore County.

=== Education ===
During his 2018 campaign, Mangione supported expanding charter schools. During the 2020 legislative session, Mangione was one of two legislators to vote against legislation that would provide an additional $577 million in funding over 10 years to historically black colleges and universities in Maryland.

During the 2021 legislative session, Mangione cosponsored legislation that would ban convicted sex offenders from being students at Maryland public schools.

In July 2021, Mangione called for the firing of Baltimore City school administrators after an investigation by WBFF found that 41 percent of all Baltimore City high school students earned less than a 1.0 grade-point average.

In 2022, Mangione signed a pledge to Moms for Liberty. During the 2024 legislative session, Mangione introduced a bill to ban "sexually explicit" material in public school libraries and unsuccessfully sought to add the bill onto the Freedom to Read Act, which prohibits public and school libraries from banning books based on partisan, ideological, or religious reasons, or based an author's origin, background, or views.

=== Immigration ===
During his 2018 campaign, Mangione was a vocal opponent to illegal immigration and said that he would not support legislation that would turn Maryland into a sanctuary state. In January 2020, he voted to sustain Governor Larry Hogan's veto on legislation that would allow Maryland high school graduates including undocumented immigrants to qualify for the lowest tuition rates at public colleges and universities under certain circumstances, saying that he feared the bill would encourage more illegal immigration. During the 2025 legislative session, after a man who had entered the United States illegally was arrested in connection with the murder of Rachel Morin in June 2024, Mangione introduced the Rachel Morin Act, which would prohibit counties and towns from adopting sanctuary city policies and require jurisdictions to fully cooperate with U.S. Immigration and Customs Enforcement (ICE) agents.

During the 2026 legislative session, Mangione opposed bills that would ban 287(g) program agreements between Maryland counties and ICE and prohibit Maryland State Police from hiring anyone who worked for ICE during the second presidency of Donald Trump. In February 2026, he wrote an open letter to Baltimore County Public Schools superintendent Myriam Rogers in which he described student protests against ICE operations as an "insurrection", urging school officials to "take any and all actions necessary to prevent any disruption of BCPS operations" and asking if there was anything he could do to prevent the protests.

=== Policing ===
During the 2026 legislative session, Mangione opposed a bill that would prohibit law enforcement officers from wearing face coverings while on duty, questioning how the state could regulate federal immigration agencies who are constitutionally allowed to operate throughout the U.S.

=== Social issues ===
During protests against the murder of George Floyd in June 2020, protesters in the Little Italy neighborhood of Baltimore tore down and threw a statue of Christopher Columbus into the Jones Falls canal of the Baltimore Harbor. Following this incident, Mangione and state delegate Kathy Szeliga wrote to Governor Larry Hogan calling on him to deploy the Maryland National Guard to protect the statue. He later introduced legislation that would prohibit any person from destroying, damaging, vandalizing or desecrating a monument, memorial, or statue of historical significance.

In 2023, Mangione voted against the Trans Health Equity Act, a bill that would require the state's Medicaid program to cover gender-affirming treatment. He later criticized the legislature for passing the bill, saying that he was upset about the direction of the legislative session: "We've promoted issues like trans equity but we haven't really done anything about crime." During the 2025 legislative session, Mangione introduced a bill to ban "sexually explicit" books in public school libraries.

In February 2026, Mangione was one of three Republicans delegates to support a bill that would prohibit investor-owned utilities from paying employee bonuses and supervisor compensation with ratepayer dollars, saying that while he believed policies passed by Democratic state lawmakers have forced utilities to pay more for their energy, he wanted to "make the point that Baltimore Gas and Electric is out of control".

== Personal life ==
Mangione is the first cousin of Luigi Mangione, a Towson man who in December 2024 was arrested and later charged with first-degree murder in connection with the killing of UnitedHealthcare CEO Brian Thompson. Following his arrest, Nino released a statement on behalf of the Mangione family expressing shock with Luigi's arrest and sympathy toward the Thompson family, and asked the public for prayers for everyone involved. Mangione also postponed a campaign fundraising event that was to be held at Hayfields Country Club, which is owned by the Mangione family, in light of Luigi's arrest. He has since refused to answer questions about Luigi.

== Electoral history ==
Maryland House of Delegates District 42B Republican primary election, 2018
Party	Candidate	Votes	%
Republican	Nino Mangione	4,389	41.4
Republican	Tim Robinson	3,471	32.7
Republican	Raymond C. Boccelli	1,635	15.4
Republican	Justin Kinsey	1,107	10.4

Maryland House of Delegates District 42B election, 2018
Party	Candidate	Votes	%
Republican	Nino Mangione	20,267	28.6
Democratic	Michele Guyton	18,815	26.5
Republican	Tim Robinson	18,090	25.5
Democratic	Sachin Hebbar	13,670	19.3
Write-in		53	0.1

Maryland House of Delegates District 42A election, 2022
Party	Candidate	Votes	%
Republican	Nino Mangione (incumbent)	12,009	58.6
Democratic	Paul V. Konka	8,475	41.3
Write-in		22	0.1

Baltimore County Council District 5 Republican primary election, 2026
Party	Candidate	Votes	%
Republican	Nino Mangione (incumbent)	5,126	72.9%
Republican	Theaux M. LeGardeur	1,906	27.1%
Total votes		7,032	100.0%

Baltimore County Council District 5 election, 2026
Party	Candidate	Votes	%
Democratic	Shawn McIntosh	21,539	49.4%
Republican	Nino Mangione (incumbent)	19,349	44.4%
Independent	Cory Shaffer	2,660	6.1%
Write-in		37	0.1%
Total votes		43,585	100.0%
