= Peter Mangione =

American soccer player (born 2001)

Personal information
- Full name: Peter Timothy Mangione
- Date of birth: August 25, 2001 (age 25)
- Place of birth: Hunt Valley, Maryland, US
- Height: 5 ft 10 in (1.78 m)
- Position: Midfielder

Team information
- Current team: Brooklyn FC
- Number: 27

Youth career
- Baltimore Celtic SC
- Baltimore Armour
- 2017–2018: Orlando City
- Baltimore Armour

College career
| Years | Team | Apps | (Gls) |
| 2020–2023 | Penn State Nittany Lions | 67 | (31) |

Senior career*
| Years | Team | Apps | (Gls) |
| 2021–2023 | Christos FC | 3 | (3) |
| 2024–2025 | FC Cincinnati 2 | 56 | (4) |
| 2025 | → FC Cincinnati (loan) | 0 | (0) |
| 2026– | Brooklyn FC | 26 | (3) |
- * Club domestic league appearances and goals as of November 4, 2026

Peter Timothy Mangione (/ˌmændʒiˈoʊni/ MAN-jee-OH-nee; born August 25, 2001) is an American professional soccer player who plays as a midfielder for USL Championship club Brooklyn FC.

Mangione is an alumnus of the Penn State Nittany Lions and a two-time Big Ten Conference Men's Soccer Player of the Year winner, and he began his professional career with FC Cincinnati 2 in MLS Next Pro.

== Early life ==
Mangione attended Dulaney High School in Timonium, Maryland. He played three seasons of youth soccer with Baltimore Celtic SC, followed by three seasons with Baltimore Armour and then one season with Orlando City Academy in 2017–18.

== College career ==
In 2020, Mangione began attending Pennsylvania State University, where he played for the men's soccer team. On February 19, 2021, he made his debut and scored his first goal in a 3–2 victory over the Maryland Terrapins. The performance earned him his first Big Ten Conference Offensive Player of the Week honor. At the end of the season, he was named to the Big Ten All-Freshman Team.

Ahead of his sophomore season, he was named a vice-captain for the team. On September 21, 2021, he scored a hat trick in a 4–0 victory over the Villanova Wildcats, which again earned him Big Ten Offensive Player of the Week honors. At the end of the season, he was named the Big Ten Offensive Player of the Year, in addition to being named to the All-Big Ten First Team, Big Ten All-Tournament Team, All-North Region First Team, and Academic All-Big Ten honors.

Ahead of his junior season, he was named to the Mac Hermann Trophy Watch List and selected as a league Forward to Watch. He was also named a team captain. In September 2022, he once again earned Big Ten Offensive Player of the Week honors. At the end of the season, he was named to the All-Big Ten First Team, All-North Region Second Team, Academic All-Big Ten, and Academic All-District.

Ahead of his senior season, he was named a Big Ten Player to Watch and Forward to Watch. During the season, he earned Big Ten Offensive Player of the Week twice. At the end of the season, he was named the Big Ten Offensive Player of the Year for the second time in his career, while also being named to the All-Big Ten First Team and All-North Region First Team. He was also named to the Scholar All-America First Team and Academic All-America Third Team. At the end of the season, he was invited to attend the MLS College Showcase. He finished his college career as Penn State's 13th all-time leading scorer, with 31 goals, while also adding 16 assists.

== Club career ==
In 2021, Mangione played with Christos FC in the National Premier Soccer League. He continued with the club as they moved to USL League Two, scoring in their league debut in a victory over Patuxent FA.

In February 2024, he signed a professional contract with FC Cincinnati 2 in MLS Next Pro. On March 17, 2024, he made his debut in a match against Chicago Fire FC II. On April 21, 2024, he scored his first goal in a 4–0 victory over Atlanta United 2. In 2025, he signed a pair of short-term loans with the FC Cincinnati first team for their CONCACAF Champions League matches.

In January 2026, Mangione signed with USL Championship side Brooklyn FC, ahead of their inaugural season. On March 8, Mangione made his debut for Brooklyn FC, drawing a foul in the penalty box in their inaugural match against Indy Eleven, which resulted in Juan Carlos Obregón scoring the resulting penalty kick and winning the game 1–0. On May 31, Mangione scored his first goal for Brooklyn FC in a 2–2 draw at Sporting Club Jacksonville, but the game was abandoned in the 75th-minute due to hazardous weather conditions. In the return fixture on August 29 against Sporting Club Jacksonville, Mangione scored a brace to help secure a 4–1 win.

== Personal life ==
Mangione belongs to the Mangione family of Maryland businesspeople descending from Nicholas Mangione. He is a cousin of politician Nino Mangione, as well as Luigi Mangione, who killed UnitedHealthcare CEO Brian Thompson.

== Career statistics ==
As of October 24, 2026

| Club | Season | League | | | U.S. Open Cup | | Playoffs | | Other | | Total | |
| Club | Season | Division | Apps | Goals | Apps | Goals | Apps | Goals | Apps | Goals | Apps | Goals |
|---|---|---|---|---|---|---|---|---|---|---|---|---|
| Christos FC | 2022 | USL League Two | 3 | 3 | — | | 0 | 0 | — | | 3 | 3 |
| FC Cincinnati 2 | 2024 | MLS Next Pro | 28 | 2 | — | | 1 | 0 | — | | 29 | 2 |
| FC Cincinnati 2 | 2025 | MLS Next Pro | 28 | 2 | 1 | 0 | 1 | 0 | — | | 30 | 2 |
| FC Cincinnati 2 | Total | | 56 | 4 | 1 | 0 | 2 | 0 | 0 | 0 | 62 | 4 |
| FC Cincinnati (loan) | 2025 | Major League Soccer | 0 | 0 | — | | 0 | 0 | 0 | 0 | 0 | 0 |
| Brooklyn FC | 2026 | USL Championship | 26 | 3 | 0 | 0 | — | | 4 (Note: Appearances in USL Cup) | 0 | 30 | 3 |
| Career total | | | 85 | 10 | 1 | 0 | 2 | 0 | 4 | 0 | 92 | 10 |
