= Kevin Ford (Maryland politician) =

American politician

Member-elect of the Maryland Senate from the 42nd district
- Assuming office January 13, 2027
- Succeeding: Chris West

Personal details
- Party: Republican

Kevin Ford is an American politician, farmer, and firefighter who is a member-elect of the Maryland Senate from the 42nd district. He is a member of the Republican Party.

== Background ==
Ford is a fire lieutenant with the Baltimore County Fire Department and owns a small farm in White Hall, Maryland.

== Maryland Senate ==
In 2025, Ford announced that he would run for the Maryland Senate in District 42 in 2026, seeking to succeed Chris West, who was retiring. During the Republican primary, he was backed by then-state delegate Nino Mangione. Ford won the Republican primary on June 23, 2026, receiving 53.6% of the vote, and defeated Democratic nominee Stephanie Popescu in the general election.

Shortly after the Republican primary election in June 2026, Ford joined a lawsuit led by several Republican candidates for the Maryland General Assembly, the U.S. House of Representatives, and county-level offices seeking to block the Maryland State Board of Elections from certifying the results of the election until it contacts every voter whose mail-in ballots were rejected, citing an error that resulted in 437,000 replacement ballots being sent out to voters. Anne Arundel County circuit court judge Robert J. Thompson denied the petition for a restraining order, saying that the complaint would not "have a great likelihood of success on the merits in this matter".

Ford will be sworn in on January 13, 2027. He will be a member of the Senate Judicial Proceedings Committee.
