= Turf Valley, Maryland =

Unincorporated community in Maryland, U.S.

Coordinates: 39°17′43″N 76°53′28″W

Turf Valley is an unincorporated community in Ellicott City, Maryland, United States. The resort is situated in a wedge between Route 70 and U.S. Route 40, with the David Force Natural Resource Area along the northern border.

== Development and Turf Valley Country Club ==
Construction contractor Samuel M. Pistorio (1902–1998) purchased 1000 acres of farmland west of Ellicott City. He introduced the $1 million Turf Valley Country Club in 1958. The 1500 person club featured two 18-hole golf courses designed by Ault and Jaminson. The Clubhouse opened in December 1959.

== Zoning amendments ==
Turf Valley proposed falling under the "New Town" zoning proposed in 1965 or the creation of the Rouse Company development Columbia. Amendments were placed in the New Town Zoning increasing the minimum required acreage owned by a project from 750 to 2500 acres, effectively removing Turf Valley from immediate competition to the project.

== Residential development and cemetery controversy ==
The Resort later was purchased by Nicholas Mangione of Mangione Enterprises. In 1979, Mangione in combination with the Gudelsky family company Percontee, planner William P. Brendle and attorney Bernard F. Goldberg petitioned to rezone the 646 acre project from three-acre lots to half-acre lots claiming 50 acres would be open space. The property was redeveloped for housing units alongside the golf course with sewer service approved in 1989. In 1985, the Catholic Archdioceses sold Donald R. Reuwer Jr. the graveyard of St. Mary's Church for $10,000. In 1991, H. Allen Becker developed Turf Valley Overlook housing development on a 3.5 acre St. Mary's Church parcel that contained Doughoregan Manor worker graves. Protesters requested that Charles I. Ecker purchase the land for open space, but development and clearing were allowed to proceed.
