= WCBM =

- Baltimore, Maryland; United States
- Broadcast area: Baltimore metropolitan area
- Frequency: 680 kHz
- Branding: Talk Radio 680 WCBM

Programming
- Language: English
- Format: Talk radio
- Affiliations: SRN News; Townhall News; Fox News Talk; Premiere Networks; Westwood One

Ownership
- Owner: WCBM Maryland, Inc.
- Sister stations: WQLL

History
- First air date: March 28, 1924
- Call sign meaning: Randomly assigned from a sequential list

Technical information
- Licensing authority: FCC
- Facility ID: 4759
- Class: B
- Power: 50,000 watts (day); 20,000 watts (night)
- Transmitter coordinates: 39°22′27.38″N 76°51′27.92″W
- Translator: 99.9 W260BV (Aberdeen)

Links
- Public license information: Public file; LMS
- Webcast: Listen live
- Website: wcbm.com

WCBM (680 AM) is a commercial radio station in Baltimore, Maryland. It is owned by WCBM Maryland, Inc., and broadcasts a talk radio format, calling itself "Talk Radio 680 WCBM". Studios and offices are on York Road in Lutherville, off the Baltimore Beltway (Interstate 695).

By day, WCBM transmits with 50,000 watts, the maximum allowed for United States AM stations. To protect other stations on 680 kHz at night, it reduces power to 20,000 watts. It uses a directional antenna at all times, with a six-tower array. The transmitter site is off Marriottsville Road in Randallstown.

== Programming ==
Weekdays on WCBM, local hosts are heard from 6 a.m. to 3 p.m. The morning drive time show is "Casey and Company" with Sean Casey and Bruce Elliot. They are followed by Derek Hunter and Rob Carson. The rest of the schedule is made up of nationally syndicated shows: Sean Hannity, Mark Levin, Todd Starnes, Bill O'Reilly and Frank Morano from WABC New York City.

Weekends feature shows on money, health, gardening, cars, movies, technology, travel, veterans affairs, real estate and religion. They include The Money Pit Home Improvement Radio Show, The Lutheran Hour, The RM Travel Show with Rudy Maxa and The Kim Komando Show. Some weekend shows are paid brokered programming. Most hours begin with an update from Townhall News.

== History ==
=== Early years ===
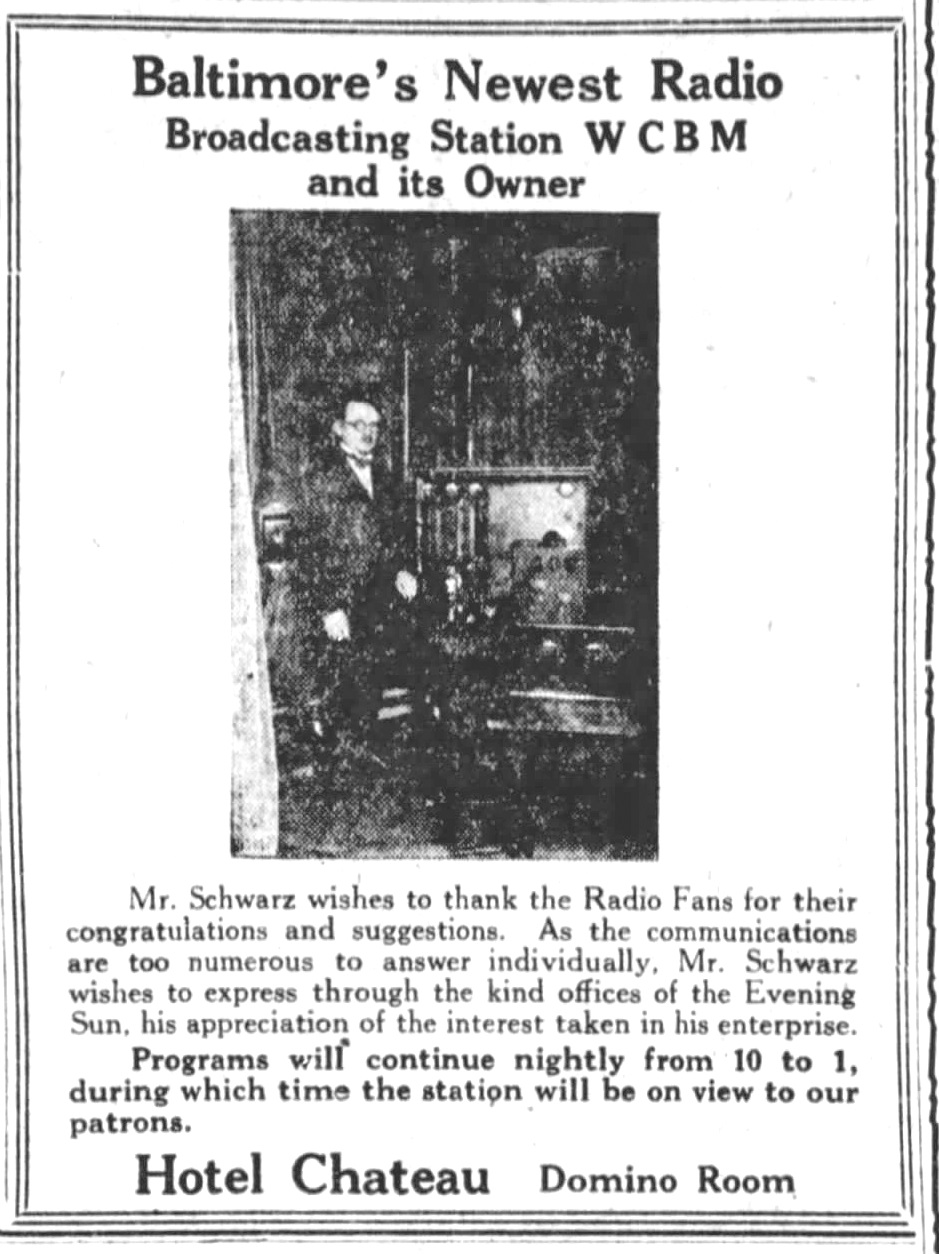
WCBM made its debut broadcast beginning at 10:00 p.m. on March 28, 1924.

WCBM was first licensed in March 1924 to Charles Schwarz on 1310 kHz. After a short series of test transmissions, it made its formal debut on the evening of March 28. The original studios were in the Hotel Chateau, located at the northwest corner of Charles Street and North Avenue. The call letters were randomly assigned from a sequential list of available call signs, although they also could be rendered as standing for "Chateau Baltimore Maryland", the hotel's name.

Following the establishment of the Federal Radio Commission (FRC) in 1927, stations were initially issued a series of temporary authorizations starting on May 3, 1927. In addition, they were informed that if they wanted to continue operating, they needed to file a formal license application by January 15, 1928, as the first step in determining whether they met the new "public interest, convenience, or necessity" standard. On May 25, 1928, the FRC issued General Order 32, which notified 164 stations, including WCBM, that "From an examination of your application for future license it does not find that public interest, convenience, or necessity would be served by granting it." However, the station successfully convinced the commission that it should remain licensed.

On November 11, 1928, the FRC implemented a major reallocation of station transmitting frequencies, as part of a reorganization resulting from its implementation of General Order 40, and WCBM was assigned to 1370 kHz. In the 1930s, WCBM had moved to the Hearst Tower Building in Baltimore. It broadcast with 500 watts by day, 250 watts at night, while competitor WBAL ran 50,000 watts. WCBM was the NBC Blue Network affiliate for Baltimore, carrying its dramas, comedies, news and sports, during the "Golden Age of Radio". The Blue Network later became ABC.

=== Move to 680 AM ===
WCBM changed transmitting frequencies numerous times. With the 1941 implementation of the North American Regional Broadcasting Agreement (NARBA), it switched from 1370 to 1400 kHz. In 1949, it relocated to its current frequency, 680 kHz, which allowed the station to increase its power to 10,000 watts in the daytime and 5,000 watts at night. As network programming shifted from radio to television in the 1950s, WCBM gradually became a full service, middle of the road music and personality station. In 1960, WCBM added an FM station, WCBM-FM at 106.5 MHz, which simulcast the AM station. It was sold to the owner of Channel 2 WMAR-TV in 1968, becoming WMAR-FM and today is WWMX, owned by Audacy.

=== Metromedia ownership ===
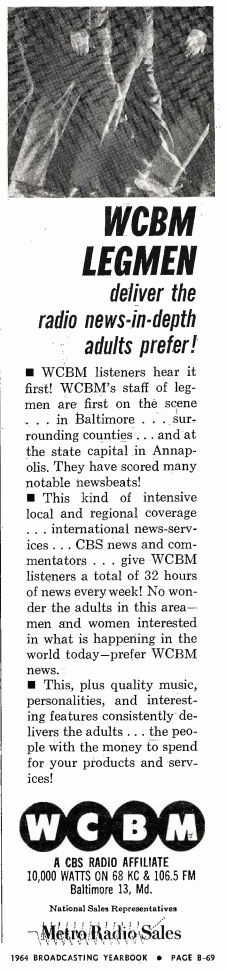
Station's 1964 "Legmen" advertisement

WCBM-AM-FM were sold in 1963, to Metromedia, a large New York City-based broadcasting company. Metromedia also owned WTTG–Washington, D.C.; WNEW, WNEW-FM and WNEW-TV–New York City; WHK and WHK-FM–Cleveland; and WIP and WIP-FM–Philadelphia. The studios were moved to Owings Mills, Maryland.

Metromedia helped WCBM establish a reputation for radio news reporting. It affiliated the station with CBS Radio News and maintained a staff of professional reporters and anchors. An advertisement in the 1964 Broadcasting Yearbook boasted that WCBM aired 32 hours of news each week, and that "WCBM listeners hear it first! WCBM's staff of legmen are first on the scene . . . in Baltimore . . . surrounding counties . . . and at the state capital in Annapolis."

But WCBM had a hard time competing with Hearst Corporation-owned WBAL, which also had a large news-gathering staff, as well as a powerful 50,000-watt signal. By the 1970s, WCBM evolved into more of an adult contemporary music format.

=== Switch to all-talk ===
In 1981, WCBM began running talk programming in the evening, while keeping its music and news in the daytime. As fewer people listened to music on AM radio, WCBM evolved to all talk by 1983. It was also the flagship station of the Baltimore Colts football team. Chuck Thompson and Vince Bagli called the action in the broadcast booth.

The station was sold in 1987, to local owners using the corporate name "Magic 680 Inc." WCBM returned to an adult contemporary format, dropping talk abruptly. After several months, it began playing oldies music, with a playlist of hits from 1955 to 1969. In 1987, when the radio broadcast rights for the Baltimore Orioles baseball team became available, WCBM outbid both WBAL and WFBR which had been the radio home of the Orioles for the previous eight years. Considered to be a major coup at the time, WCBM's tenure as the Orioles flagship lasted only one season, as the station faced severe financial difficulties. By 1988, WCBM had filed Chapter 11 bankruptcy, went dark soon after, and was put up for sale.

=== Rescue from bankruptcy & the Mangione ownership ===
At about the same time that WCBM was in the middle of bankruptcy, rival AM station 1300 WFBR was sold in 1988, and changed its format from news/talk to 1950s' rock & roll. With the format flip, WFBR let go most of the station's talk show hosts that summer. In October 1988, WCBM was bought by Baltimore area businessman and philanthropist Nick Mangione, Sr. who resurrected it from bankruptcy. A World War II veteran, Mangione was an avid listener of talk radio and a fan of WFBR's former talk radio format. Once he acquired the station, Mangione brought most of WFBR's former talk radio line-up to WCBM, including Frank Luber, Joe Lombardo, Tom Marr, Ken Maylath, Les Kinsolving and Stan "The Fan" Charles.

WCBM originally had The Rush Limbaugh Show on its weekday schedule in the early 1990s, but lost it to competitor 1090 WBAL in 1994. With its stronger signal and higher ratings, Limbaugh's syndicator put the program on WBAL. At the time, WCBM was broadcasting at 10,000 watts by day and 5,000 watts night. WCBM had to scramble to replace Limbaugh in the Noon to 3 p.m. slot, choosing Zoh Hieronimus to fill the role. Despite having a following, Zoh Heironimus didn't capture the listeners as well as Limbaugh. So WCBM added Dr. Laura Schlessinger to the 12–3 spot but her ratings dropped further. After WJFK (1300 AM) discontinued his program, WCBM added the syndicated G. Gordon Liddy Show. Liddy improved the ratings numbers for WCBM, although was not as successful as Limbaugh. By the end of 2001, The Sean Hannity Show was added to the 3–6 p.m. time slot, replacing Bob Scherr.

=== Power boost ===
In 2001, WCBM completed construction on a new six-tower transmitter array in Randallstown, Maryland. WCBM went to a daytime power of 50,000 watts in 2004. The nighttime power increased to 20,000 watts. At the end of his contract with WBAL, on July 1, 2006, Limbaugh returned to WCBM. WBAL did not renew its contract with Premiere Networks due to the high cost. The station decided to go with a local host and use the extra money to win back the broadcast rights to the Baltimore Orioles and to go after the rights to the Baltimore Ravens football team. Limbaugh's show replaced G. Gordon Liddy in the early afternoon time slot. The Mark Levin Show, syndicated by Westwood One, debuted on the same day as Limbaugh's return, airing from 7 to 9 p.m.

In 2009, WCBM dropped the ABC News Radio Network and switched to Fox News Radio for its world and national news coverage. This change coincided with competitor 1090 WBAL's change to an all news morning show. For both WCBM and WBAL, new station sweepers, imaging, station IDs and music accompanied the changes in programming. WCBM's imaging now centers on its affiliation with Fox News. During the end of 2020, WCBM changed national news affiliation from Fox News to Townhall News, part of the Salem Radio Network.

=== Lineup changes ===
Previous logo

On October 31, 2019, veteran personality Frank Luber retired after 31 years with WCBM, 27 of them hosting "Maryland's Wake Up Call." Luber's co-host, Sean Casey, was teamed with former late morning host Bruce Elliott for "The Morning Drive with Casey & Elliott". Derek Hunter, formerly of 1090 WBAL, took Elliott's time slot, 9 to 11:45 a.m. Hunter departed the station in 2023.

With the death of syndicated host Rush Limbaugh in February 2021, WCBM management decided to temporarily replace his popular early afternoon show with local programming. Derek Hunter was moved to Limbaugh's early afternoon time slot, with Elliott relocated to late mornings and Casey remaining as the wake-up host.

In September 2021, WCBM began the syndication of "The Rob Carson Show" from Newsmax Radio. The show airs in the early afternoon slot of Noon-3 p.m. "The Morning Drive with Casey & Elliott" returned after to the early morning timeslot after the change.

As of December 2024, the station airs full local programming from 6 a.m. in the mornings, with syndication in the afternoon hours. Former Republican Congressional Candidate, Kimberly Klacik, hosts her own show on the station from 9 a.m. to Noon.
