= Nicholas Mangione =

American businessman (1925–2008)

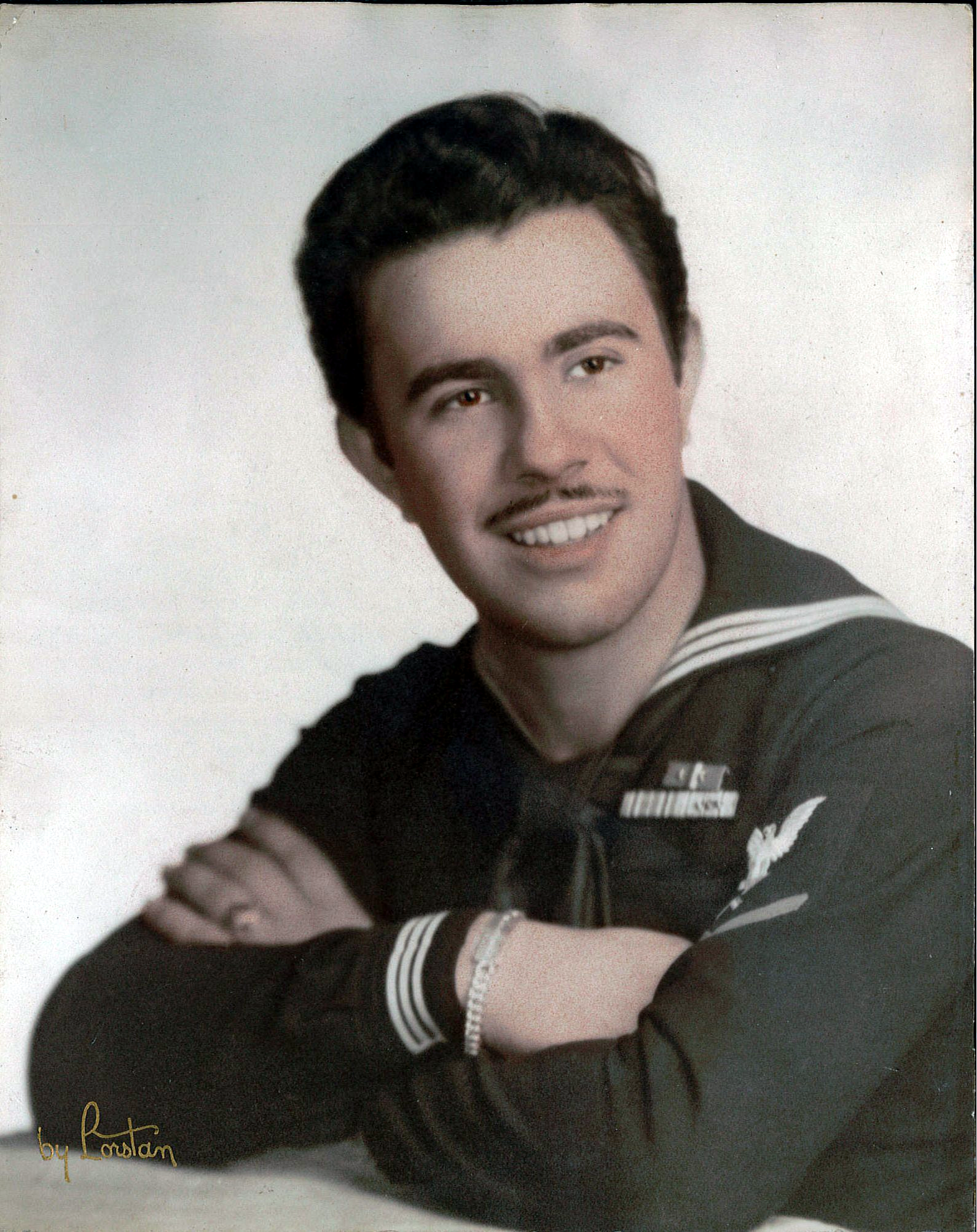
- Nicholas Mangione serving in the U.S. Navy, c. 1943–45
- Born: Nicholas Bernard Mangione; February 17, 1925; Baltimore, Maryland, U.S.
- Died: November 2, 2008 (aged 83); Towson, Maryland, U.S.
- Resting place: Dulaney Valley Memorial Gardens, Timonium, Maryland
- Education: Maryland Institute College of Art
- Occupation: Real estate developer
- Known for: Founding Lorien Health Services
- Spouse: Mary Cuba (m. 1950)
- Children: 10
- Relatives: Nino Mangione (grandson); Luigi Mangione (grandson); Peter Mangione (grandson)
- Military career
- Allegiance: United States
- Branch: United States Navy
- Service years: 1943–1945
- Unit: USS Caperton (DD-650)
- Conflicts: World War II; Battle of the Philippine Sea

Nicholas Bernard Mangione (/ˌmændʒiˈoʊni/ MAN-jee-OH-nee, Italian: [manˈdʒoːne]; February 17, 1925 – November 2, 2008) was an American real estate developer. He was the founder of Lorien Health Services and owner of the radio station WCBM, both in Baltimore. Mangione also owned country clubs, hotels, and resorts in the Baltimore area, including Hayfields Country Club and Turf Valley. Mangione's descendants (including 10 children and some 37 grandchildren) remain a prominent family in Maryland business and politics; they include American killer Luigi Mangione, politician Nino Mangione, and professional soccer player Peter Mangione. He was a World War II veteran.

== Early life and education ==
Mangione was born in Baltimore's Little Italy neighborhood on February 17, 1925. He was the eldest son and the second of four children of Maria "Mary" (née Villano; 1898–1964) and Luigi "Louis" Mangione (1890–1936), an Italian immigrant couple from Castrogiovanni, Sicily. His father was illiterate and worked for Baltimore's water department until he died of pneumonia when Nicholas was 11 years old.

Mangione sold newspapers and peddled shopping bags at the Belair Market while he attended St. James the Less Commercial School. He was working his first full-time job as an accounts-receivable clerk at age 15 and later worked for a different company as a secretary-bookkeeper. In January 1943, a month before Mangione turned 18 years old, he enlisted in the United States Navy and reported to the destroyer USS Caperton. While serving aboard the Caperton, he fought in the Battle of the Philippine Sea. After completing his military service, he returned to the U.S. in December 1945 and attended the Maryland Institute Evening School (now the Maryland Institute College of Art) until 1949. He then became a bricklaying contractor.

== Career ==
In 1949, after two and a half years of working as a contractor, Mangione bought out his estimating partner, Michael Demarino, and founded Mangione & Co., a contract-based construction company. In 1977, Mangione founded the nursing home company Lorien Health Services. His son Louis later became the owner. In July 1970, Baltimore Mayor Thomas D'Alesandro Jr. appointed Mangione to the Baltimore City Board of Education. Mangione's term expired on December 31, 1970, and he was succeeded by Stephen McNierney.

Mangione purchased Turf Valley in Ellicott City, Maryland, in 1978. The club underwent multiple renovations and expansions under Mangione's ownership. In 1988, a group of Black businessmen in Howard County, Maryland criticized Mangione for not hiring enough minority managers at the country club, to which Mangione responded, "I have eight of my kids there. Do they expect me to fire one of them and put somebody else in their place?" Turf Valley later became the center of a boycott after Mangione's nephew and resort manager Frederick B. Grimmel Jr. called a Black NAACP member the N-word during a taped conversation; Mangione was reluctant to fire his nephew, first suspending Grimmel with pay but eventually firing him after pressure from the Black community increased. As part of Grimmel's removal, Mangione signed an agreement calling on the U.S. Department of Justice's Community Relations Office to conduct sensitivity training for club employees and for the Howard County Office of Human Rights to investigate whether the country club was engaging in racially discriminatory hiring practices. The Humans Rights Office did so, and found no evidence of hiring discrimination. Grimmel was rehired several months after his firing, and Mangione later told The Baltimore Sun that he believed he was unfairly criticized by the NAACP.

Mangione alleged that people were skeptical of his success as a businessman because they assumed he must have received money from the Italian Mafia. He told The Baltimore Sun he had experienced discrimination in the 1970s at other country clubs such as the Baltimore Country Club and the Elkridge Club, stating that "It was because I was Italian, plain and simple." He later said that attitudes at both clubs had changed since these incidents, but added that he would never play at either course again.

In December 1986, Mangione purchased the 474-acre Hayfields farm in Hunt Valley, Maryland, for a price between $4 and $5 million, with the intention of developing a 1,600-house community. Hayfields's previous owner, I. H. "Bud" Hammerman, similarly sought to redevelop the farmland into a 1,250-unit residential community, which failed to get zoning approval in 1980 and 1984 after facing opposition from community residents. At the time of Mangione's purchase, Hayfields included seven historic structures, including an 186-year-old farmhouse that housed Union and Confederate troops during the American Civil War. After his initial proposal was rejected by the Baltimore County Planning Board in 1988, Mangione proposed another plan to redevelop 226 of Hayfields's 474 acres to build 50 high-priced houses and a golf course on Hayfields, which was approved by the county zoning board in July 1995. Mangione then proposed another plan to redevelop the remaining 248 acres, which was approved by the Baltimore County Planning Board in May 1996. The Hayfields Country Club opened on July 24, 1998.

Mangione purchased the conservative talk radio station WCBM in 1986. A supporter of conservative radio, Mangione later purchased two other conservative talk radio stations, WWLG and WASA.

== Philanthropy ==
Nicholas Mangione and his family had close ties with the Greater Baltimore Medical Center, which has a ward named in honor of Mangione, and where all of his descendants have been born since 1938.

Mangione and his wife were also members of the board of trustees of Loyola University Maryland and major benefactors to the school, being major donors for the acquisition of the school's copy of The Saint John's Bible and the university fitness and aquatic center.

== Personal life and death ==
Mangione had 10 children with his wife, Mary (née Cuba; 1930–2023), six of whom graduated from Loyola University Maryland in Baltimore. As of December 2024, he had 37 grandchildren, including Nino Mangione, a member of the Maryland House of Delegates representing northern Baltimore County; Luigi Mangione, who was arrested in December 2024 and charged with first-degree murder in connection with the killing of Brian Thompson, the CEO of UnitedHealthcare; and professional soccer player Peter Mangione.

Mangione died on November 2, 2008, at the Greater Baltimore Medical Center in Towson, Maryland, after suffering a stroke. He was 83 years old. His wife, Mary, died in 2023.

== See also ==
- History of Italians in Baltimore
- Mangione family of Maryland
