= Luigi Mangione =

American killer (born 1998)

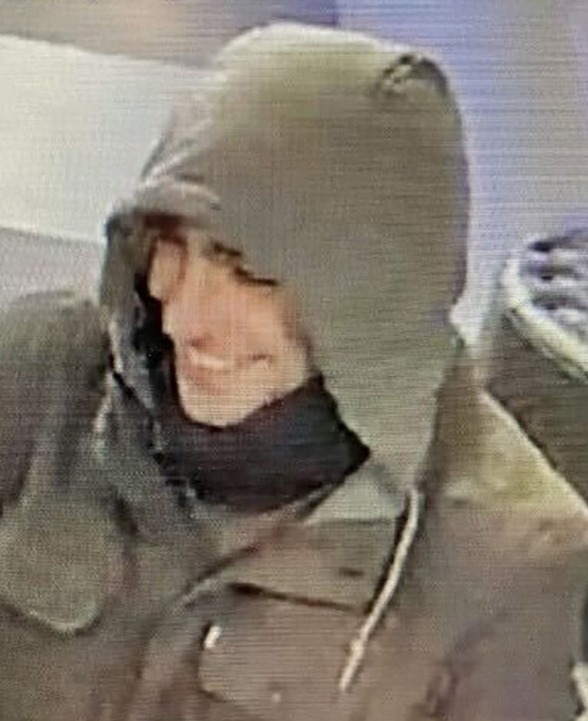
- Mangione captured on CCTV in the days before the killing
- Born: Luigi Nicholas Mangione; May 6, 1998 (age 28); Towson, Maryland, U.S.
- Other name: Mark Rosario; (false name)
- Citizenship: United States; Italy (Note: Since 2008, Mangione has also held Italian citizenship which he acquired through jus sanguinis laws.)
- Education: University of Pennsylvania (BSE, MSE)
- Known for: Killing UnitedHealthcare CEO Brian Thompson
- Relatives: Mangione family of Maryland
- Status: Incarcerated at Metropolitan Detention Center, Brooklyn, New York
- Motive: Opposition to the health insurance industry
- Convictions: Federal: Interstate stalking resulting in death; Stalking through use of interstate facilities resulting in death

Details
- Date: December 4, 2024
- Country: United States
- State: New York
- Locations: Manhattan, New York City
- Killed: 1 (Brian Thompson)
- Weapon: Glock 19–styled 3D-printed firearm
- Date apprehended: December 9, 2024

Luigi Nicholas Mangione (/ˌmændʒiˈoʊni/ MAN-jee-OH-nee; born May 6, 1998) is an American man who is on trial for the killing of Brian Thompson, the CEO of UnitedHealthcare, in 2024.

Born and raised in the U.S. state of Maryland, Mangione attended the University of Pennsylvania and became a software engineer. Claiming severe back pain and disillusionment with the U.S. health insurance industry, he is convicted of the stalking and shooting resulting in Thompson's death in Manhattan, New York City, on December 4, 2024. Following a nationwide manhunt, he was arrested in Altoona, Pennsylvania, five days after the shooting. Mangione was indicted on eleven New York state charges and four federal charges, including first-degree murder (Note: The state of New York defines first- and second-degree murder differently from most states. Usually, premeditated murder is first-degree; in New York, it is second-degree, with first-degree being reserved for a premeditated murder with one of a list of aggravating factors. The only possibly applicable one in Mangione's case is murder committed as an act of terrorism. See Murder in New York law.) in furtherance of terrorism, criminal possession of a weapon, and stalking. His two state terror-related murder charges were dismissed in September 2025; prosecutors initially sought capital punishment in his federal case until the charges that carried the possibility of the death penalty were dismissed in January 2026. In August 2026, Mangione pleaded guilty to the federal stalking charges and admitted to fatally shooting Thompson.

Since his arrest, Mangione has received significant public attention. According to a 2024 YouGov poll conducted shortly after the arrest, Americans on average were more likely to view Mangione unfavorably than favorably; however, Americans under 30 were more likely to view him favorably than unfavorably. Mangione has drawn international support through graffiti, social media, and local court hearings, transforming him into a folk hero for some of those critical of the U.S. health insurance industry and its claim denial practices.

== Early life, education, and career ==
Luigi Nicholas Mangione was born on May 6, 1998, in Towson, Maryland, to Kathleen (née Zannino) and Louis Mangione, a Baltimore-area couple of Italian descent. He has two older sisters. His paternal grandfather, Nicholas Mangione, was a successful Baltimore businessman, with 10 children (five sons and five daughters) and 37 grandchildren; one of his grandchildren being Nino Mangione, a member of the Baltimore County Council.

Mangione attended Gilman School, an all-boys private secondary school in Baltimore, where he participated in sports such as soccer, track, cross country, and wrestling. He developed an interest in video games and video game development, teaching himself how to code, and co-founding an iOS game development company, AppRoar Studios. Mangione graduated as the valedictorian of his class in 2016. His valedictorian speech praised his classmates' achievements, expressed gratitude to teachers and faculty, and thanked parents in attendance for sending him and his classmates to Gilman School, which was "far from a small financial investment". He did not speak about himself.

Mangione attended the University of Pennsylvania, where he graduated cum laude in 2020 with a Bachelor of Science in Engineering (BSE) in computer engineering and a Master of Science in Engineering (MSE) in computer and information science. His undergraduate studies included a minor in mathematics, and his graduate curriculum concentrated on artificial intelligence. In 2016, Mangione founded UPGRADE (University of Pennsylvania Game Research And Development Environment), the university's first game development club, which aimed to connect artists, programmers, and creatives passionate about video games. In a 2018 interview, Mangione said, "We don't turn people away for not having experience. Passion is what we're looking for." The club grew to include about 60 members and remained active as of January 2026.

While an undergraduate student, Mangione completed a robotics research internship at the Whiting School of Engineering at Johns Hopkins University, and was a user interface programming intern with Firaxis Games between May 2016 and August 2017, where he worked on the video game Civilization VI. During the summer of 2019, he served as a counselor for Stanford University's artificial intelligence pre-collegiate (high school) studies program in California.

In November 2020, Mangione began working remotely as a data engineer for TrueCar. He left his job at the end of February 2023, sharing with a former classmate that "Data engineering paid super well but was mind-numbingly boring" and that he wanted to "spend more time reading and doing yoga".

== Killing of Brian Thompson ==
=== Killing ===
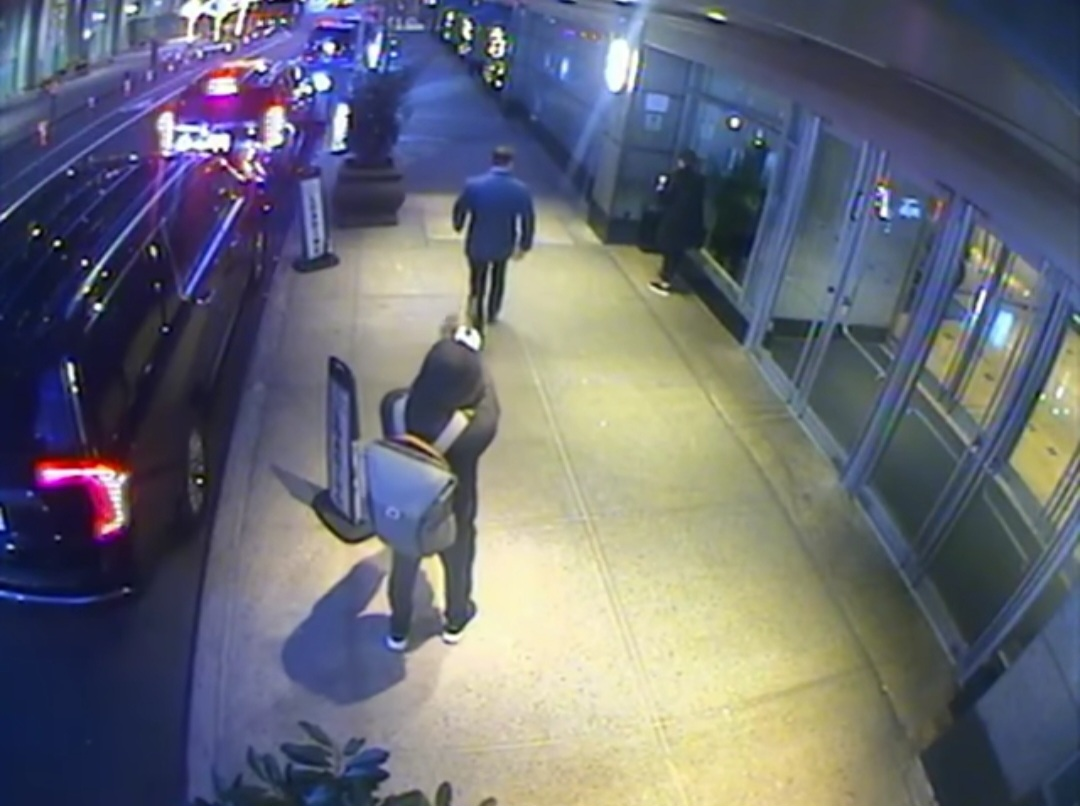
Mangione aiming his firearm at Thompson preparing to shoot him

Brian Thompson, CEO of the American health insurance company UnitedHealthcare, was shot and killed in Midtown Manhattan on December 4, 2024. The shooting occurred early in the morning outside an entrance to the New York Hilton Midtown hotel and was captured on video. Thompson was shot in the leg and the back. He was in the city to attend an annual investors' meeting for UnitedHealthcare's parent company, UnitedHealth Group. The suspect, initially described as a white man wearing a mask, fled the scene. The gunman was masked and had come to New York via a bus from Atlanta. The words delay, deny, and depose were written on the spent cases and an ejected cartridge. The three words are similar to "Delay, Deny, Defend", a well-known phrase in the insurance industry alluding to insurance companies' efforts to avoid paying claims. The suspect was seen at a bus terminal after the killing. In a Central Park wooded area, New York police discovered a backpack—supposedly disposed of by the gunman—that contained Monopoly money and a Tommy Hilfiger jacket.

=== Arrest ===
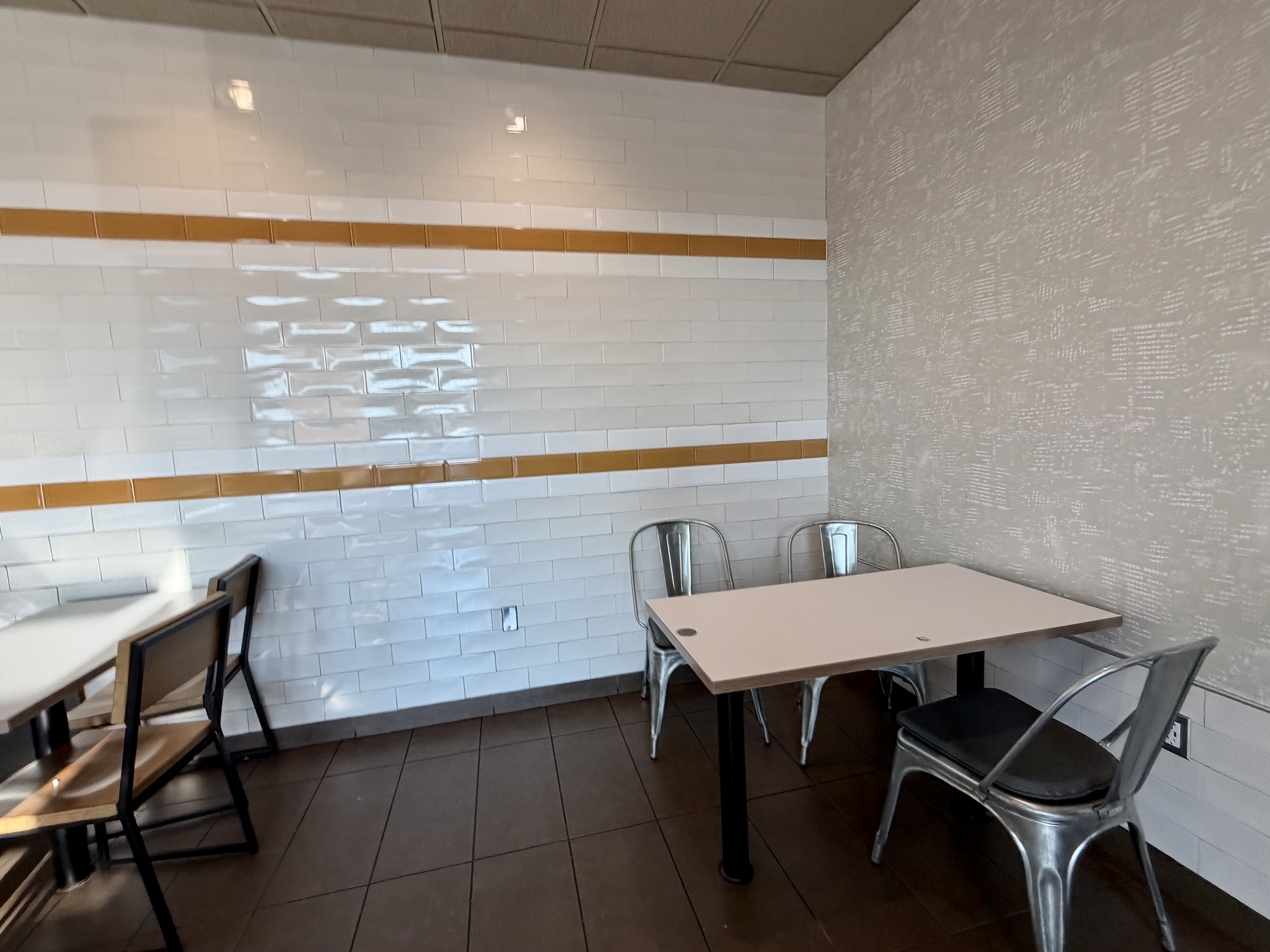
The rear-corner table at the Altoona McDonald’s where Mangione was arrested on December 9, 2024

After a five-day nationwide manhunt, local police arrested Mangione at a McDonald's restaurant on East Plank Road in Altoona, Pennsylvania, on December 9, 2024. Police responded to a call an employee made after a customer noticed similarities between Mangione's appearance and images of Thompson's alleged killer released by the New York City Police Department (NYPD). Altoona is about 280 miles (450 km) west of New York City. Police reported that Mangione was "visibly nervous" when asked if he had recently visited New York City, and during testimony, when asked how he knew that Mangione was nervous, the arresting officer said, "I saw his fingers shaking a little bit."

At approximately 10 a.m., police arrested Mangione for "forgery" and "false identification to law enforcement". He was searched, handcuffed, and transported back to Altoona Police Department's station. His backpack was also searched. After officers found a gun magazine inside the backpack, they decided to take everything back to the police station. Rolling Stone reported that "On the body-worn camera footage, Fox is shown placing a large McDonald's bag full of evidence, including Mangione's laptop, into the trunk of his SUV. Wasser takes the backpack with her." Both officers turned off their body-worn cameras when leaving the McDonald's. There is no video footage for 11 minutes. Wasser testified that she and Fox pulled over on the way to the station so he could give her the McDonald's bag.

At the station, upon searching Mangione's backpack again, police said they found a 3D-printed gun and a 3D-printed suppressor. They stated that they also found a fake New Jersey driver's license bearing the name "Mark Rosario". Reportedly, a man who checked into a Manhattan hostel in late November used an ID with the same name. Police later reported that shell casings found at the crime scene matched the gun found on Mangione. They also said that when they arrested him, they found a 262-word handwritten document (which many media outlets characterized as a "manifesto") partly about the American healthcare system. According to NYPD Commissioner Jessica Tisch, the handwritten document spoke to Mangione's "motivation and mindset". Journalist Ken Klippenstein published a transcription of the document police said was found on him; police confirmed that the transcription was authentic.

Mangione had no prior criminal record. The legality of the search of his backpack has been contested, and a motion to suppress the resulting evidence, including the handwritten document, has been made.

=== State and federal charges ===
Commonwealth v. Mangione
- Court: Blair County Court of Common Pleas
- Full case name: Commonwealth of Pennsylvania v. Luigi Nicholas Mangione
- Docket nos.: Current: CP-07-CR-0002724-2024; Original: MJ-24102-CR-0000623-2024
- Citation: "Selected Postings". The Unified Judicial System of Pennsylvania.

Court membership
- Judge sitting: Jackie Atherton Bernard

After arresting Mangione at McDonald's for forgery and falsely identifying himself to the authorities, a police criminal complaint filed at 5:13 p.m. the same day added charges of carrying a gun without a license, "tampering with records or identification", and possessing "instruments of crime". He was arraigned at the Blair County Courthouse at 6:30 p.m. and was denied bail. Mangione was then transferred to the State Correctional Institution at Huntingdon, a close-security state correctional facility in Huntingdon County, Pennsylvania.

People v. Mangione
- Court: New York Supreme Court
- Full case name: People of the State of New York v. Luigi Mangione
- Docket nos.: IND-75657-24/001
- Citation: CR-036031-24NY

Court membership
- Judge sitting: Gregory Carro

On the day of his arrest, December 9, 2024, NYPD officers and prosecutors from the Manhattan district attorney's office traveled to Altoona to question Mangione. Later that day, Manhattan prosecutors issued an arrest warrant charging him with second-degree murder, three counts of illegal weapons possession, and forgery. The next day, December 10, as he was led into the courthouse for another hearing, Mangione shouted at the press gathered there, "Your coverage of this event is completely out of touch and an insult to the intelligence of the American people and their lived experience."

On December 17, 2024, the Manhattan district attorney's office indicted Mangione on eleven New York state charges:

- one count of first-degree murder in furtherance of terrorism;
- two counts of second-degree murder, one of which as a killing in the act of terrorism;
- two counts of second-degree criminal possession of a weapon;
- four counts of third-degree criminal possession of a weapon;
- one count of fourth-degree criminal possession of a weapon;
- one count of second-degree criminal possession of a forged instrument.

United States v. Mangione
- Court: United States District Court for the Southern District of New York
- Full case name: United States of America v. Luigi Nicholas Mangione
- Docket nos.: 1:25-CR-00176

Court membership
- Judge sitting: Margaret Garnett

Mangione was extradited to New York City on December 19, 2024, the same day federal prosecutors issued a complaint charging Mangione with four federal crimes, including one count of murder through the use of a firearm—a death-penalty eligible charge. On December 23, he was arraigned in the New York Supreme Court and pleaded not guilty to his state charges.

During his second presidency, U.S. president Donald Trump signed an executive order that requires the death penalty to be used wherever possible. U.S. attorney general Pam Bondi announced on April 1, 2025, that because of the president's directive, prosecutors would seek the death penalty in Mangione's federal case. On April 17, 2025, he was formally indicted on four federal charges:

- one count of murder with a firearm;
- one count of another firearms offense;
- two counts of stalking.

The indictment charged that Mangione had crossed state lines in order to stalk and kill Thompson. On April 25, he was arraigned in the Thurgood Marshall United States Courthouse and pleaded not guilty to his federal charges.

Mangione is being held at the Metropolitan Detention Center (MDC) in Brooklyn under Federal Register Number 52503-511.

=== Defense ===
Mangione retained defense attorney Thomas Dickey for his Pennsylvania case. On December 13, 2024, he retained Karen Friedman Agnifilo, a former prosecutor at the Manhattan district attorney's office and former legal analyst with CNN, as his defense attorney for the New York case. He later hired prison consultant Craig Rothfeld to assist with matters related to his incarceration.

Mangione pleaded not guilty to all of the Pennsylvania and New York charges. After the United States Department of Justice announced their intent to seek the death penalty in April, his New York defense team requested that the judge block the Justice Department from pursuing the death penalty, arguing that the decision was a "publicity stunt" and "consistent with the new culture of the highest levels of the Justice Department, one that values personal will over process, publicity over discretion and partisan politics over justice".

By December 13, 2024, crowdfunding platform GoFundMe had removed fundraisers created to support Mangione due to the site's terms of service prohibiting fundraisers for the legal defense of violent crimes. A GiveSendGo fundraiser has remained live and, as of May 2026 (which coincided with Mangione's 28th birthday) has raised over US$1.5 million. Donors have cited the "politicization" of the case, the potential use of the death penalty, due process, and frustrations with the healthcare system as reasons for their donations. Karen Friedman Agnifilo told Newsweek that Mangione is "aware of the fund and very much appreciates the outpouring of support" and "plans on utilizing it to fight all three of the unprecedented cases against him". On February 14, 2025, Mangione's New York defense team launched a website dedicated to providing updates on his prosecutions due to the "extraordinary volume of inquiries and outpouring of support".

=== State proceedings ===
On September 16, 2025, Judge Gregory Carro, presiding over the New York State case, dismissed two terrorism-related murder charges—first-degree murder in furtherance of terrorism and second-degree murder as a crime of terrorism—ruling that prosecutors presented "no evidence" to meet the legal threshold for acts intended to intimidate or coerce the public.

Pre-trial suppression hearings for the New York State case began on December 1, 2025, and lasted three weeks until December 18, 2025. In body camera footage played at the hearing, officers involved in Mangione's arrest were heard arguing over the necessity of a warrant to search Mangione's alleged bag. His defense sought to exclude a gun and notebook from being shown to jurors at trial because police obtained them without a warrant. Judge Carro ruled on May 18, 2026, that the evidence from the search of the backpack at the McDonald's should be suppressed, as it constituted an "improper warrantless search". However, other pieces of evidence obtained at the Altoona police station, including the alleged 3D-printed gun, were allowed.

Judge Carro tentatively scheduled the state trial to begin on September 8, 2026. The trial was postponed indefinitely after Mangione's defense filed a motion seeking dismissal of the state charges on double jeopardy grounds following his federal guilty plea. His next court appearance is scheduled for December 10, 2026.

=== Federal proceedings ===
On January 30, 2026, U.S. district judge Margaret Garnett dismissed two federal charges—a death-eligible "murder through the use of a firearm" and a "firearms offense"—stating that they were "legally incompatible" with the two stalking charges. Mangione no longer faces the death penalty. Judge Garnett allowed evidence seized from Mangione's backpack at the time of his arrest to be used at trial.

On August 14, 2026, Mangione pleaded guilty to the two federal stalking charges and admitted to killing Thompson. During the change of plea hearing, Mangione said that "after years of enduring severe pain from a broken back, navigating the obstacles of the health insurance system and witnessing similar experiences of countless others", he learned about and did research on UnitedHealthcare's annual investor conference, which he said "would be attended by company executives, the board of directors and hundreds of investors, not doctors, nurses and patients." He said he posed as an investor at a firm managing over billions in assets, emailed the UnitedHealthcare leadership team to inquire about the conference, and noted that "Unlike my previous interactions with insurers, I received an immediate response within an hour." Mangione said that on December 4, 2024, the day of the UnitedHealthcare annual investor conference, he "shot Mr. Thompson in Manhattan and he died. When I did so, I understood that my actions would place him in fear of death or serious bodily injury. I knew what I was doing was illegal."

His sentencing is scheduled for December 18.

== Personal life ==
By virtue of his ancestry, Mangione has held dual American and Italian citizenship since 2008. After graduation, he moved to Hawaii and resided at Surfbreak, a co-living space in Honolulu, from January to June 2022. An avid reader of books, he co-founded a book club at Surfbreak in 2023; the book club ended when he left Hawaii later that year. In February 2024, Mangione told a friend that he was "going backpacking for awhile", and did a solo trip through East and Southeast Asia, visiting Japan, Thailand, and other countries.

In June 2024, Mangione stopped posting on social media. His family members reached out to his past friends for help in tracking him down, but they were unsuccessful. On November 18, 2024, his mother reported him missing to the San Francisco Police Department (SFPD); she stated that the family had not heard from him since July. She contacted the SFPD because she believed he was living in San Francisco and still worked for TrueCar, which had an office there.

=== Health ===
Mangione had discussed getting Lyme disease at age 13, and wrote that he had been experiencing brain fog since high school. He had also sought advice online regarding irritable bowel syndrome and visual snow. While studying at the University of Pennsylvania, Mangione wrote in a post online that he had considered dropping out due to worsening health issues but had decided against it, writing, "Staying in college has at least let me maintain some semblance of normality".

Mangione has written that he suffers from spondylolisthesis. While living in Hawaii, his back pain worsened due to a surfing mishap, and he had expressed concerns to others about the pain. He underwent spinal fusion surgery in July 2023 and wrote on social media that the surgery went well. Police have stated that UnitedHealthcare did not insure Mangione.

=== Social media presence ===
After his arrest, several news outlets analyzed Mangione's social media to gather information about his social, political, and religious views. His Twitter account, "PepMangione", posted about topics such as religion, history, ethics, and politics. Analysts found him to be "fascinated by AI and decision theory; pro-technology but anti-smartphones; secular and scientific in his outlook".

Mangione showed a skeptical attitude toward both Joe Biden and Donald Trump. Multiple sources have reported that he followed Democratic representative Alexandria Ocasio-Cortez, independent Robert F. Kennedy Jr., and others. These sources labeled him as politically uncategorized and "anti-system". Time magazine said it could not discern whether his political views were left- or right-wing. The Spectator wrote that his worldview "wasn't pinned to a standard left-right axis". Jacobin stated he held "a hodgepodge of views and political beliefs that don't neatly map onto any one category on the political spectrum". Maryland's state voter records indicate that Mangione is registered as having no party affiliation.

Mangione posted a Goodreads review of "Unabomber" Ted Kaczynski's Industrial Society and Its Future, describing Kaczynski as "rightfully imprisoned" and criticizing his use of violence against innocent individuals. The review was quoted as writing, "Clearly written by a mathematics prodigy. Reads like a series of lemmas on the question of 21st-century quality of life", and "It's easy to quickly and thoughtless [sic] write this off as the manifesto of a lunatic, in order to avoid facing some of the uncomfortable problems it identifies ... but it's simply impossible to ignore how prescient many of his predictions about modern society turned out". The review, which gave the manifesto four out of five stars, also contained a quote the reviewer claimed to have found online. The quote included the lines, "'Violence never solved anything' is a statement uttered by cowards and predators" and "When all other forms of communication fail, violence is necessary to survive".

== Public image ==
Graffiti in support of Mangione

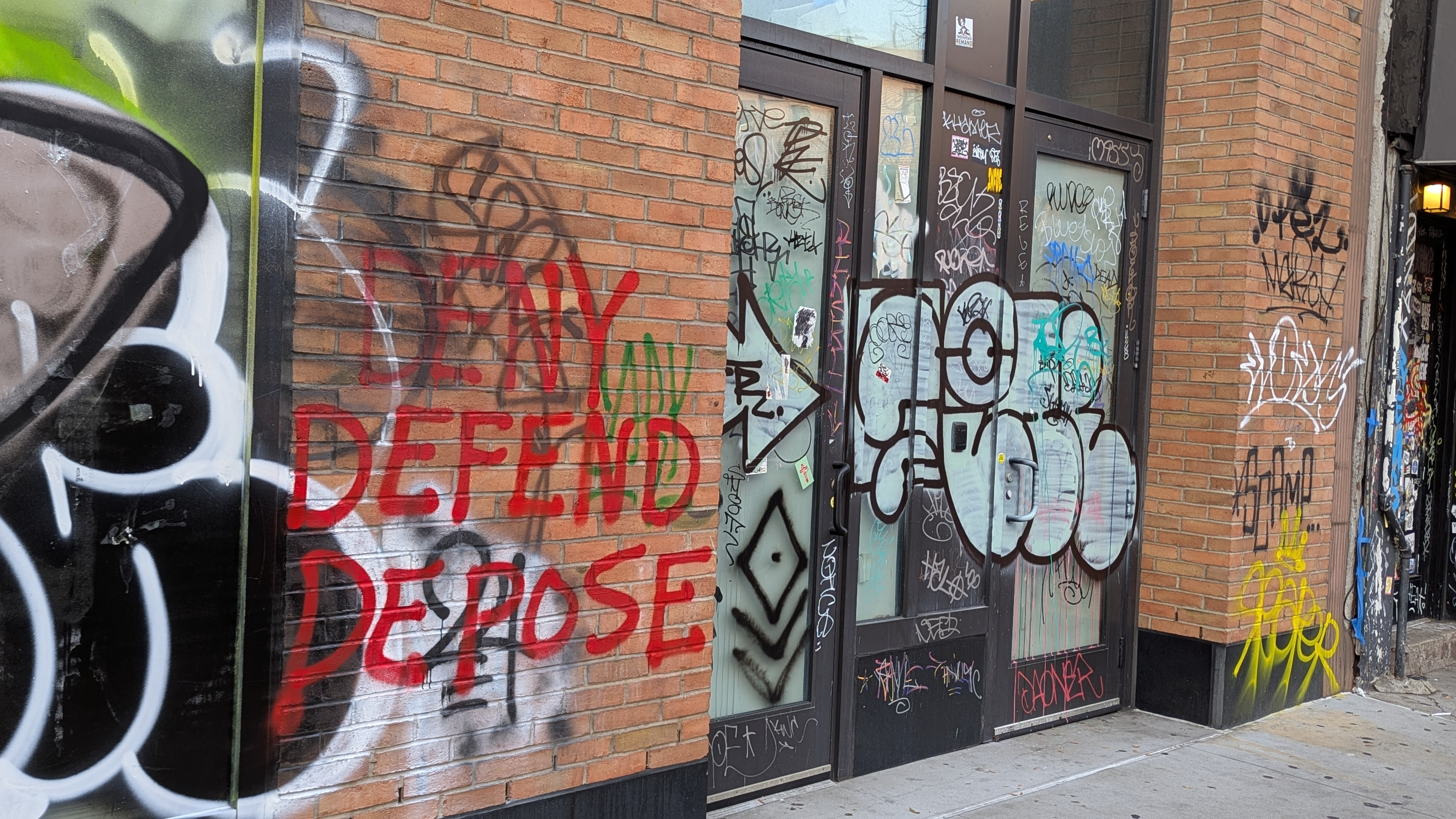
"Deny Defend Depose" in New York City (Note: A senior New York City law enforcement official briefed on the investigation initially stated that shell casings found at the scene had the words "deny," "defend" and "depose" written on them, but police later clarified that it was "delay" and not "defend.")

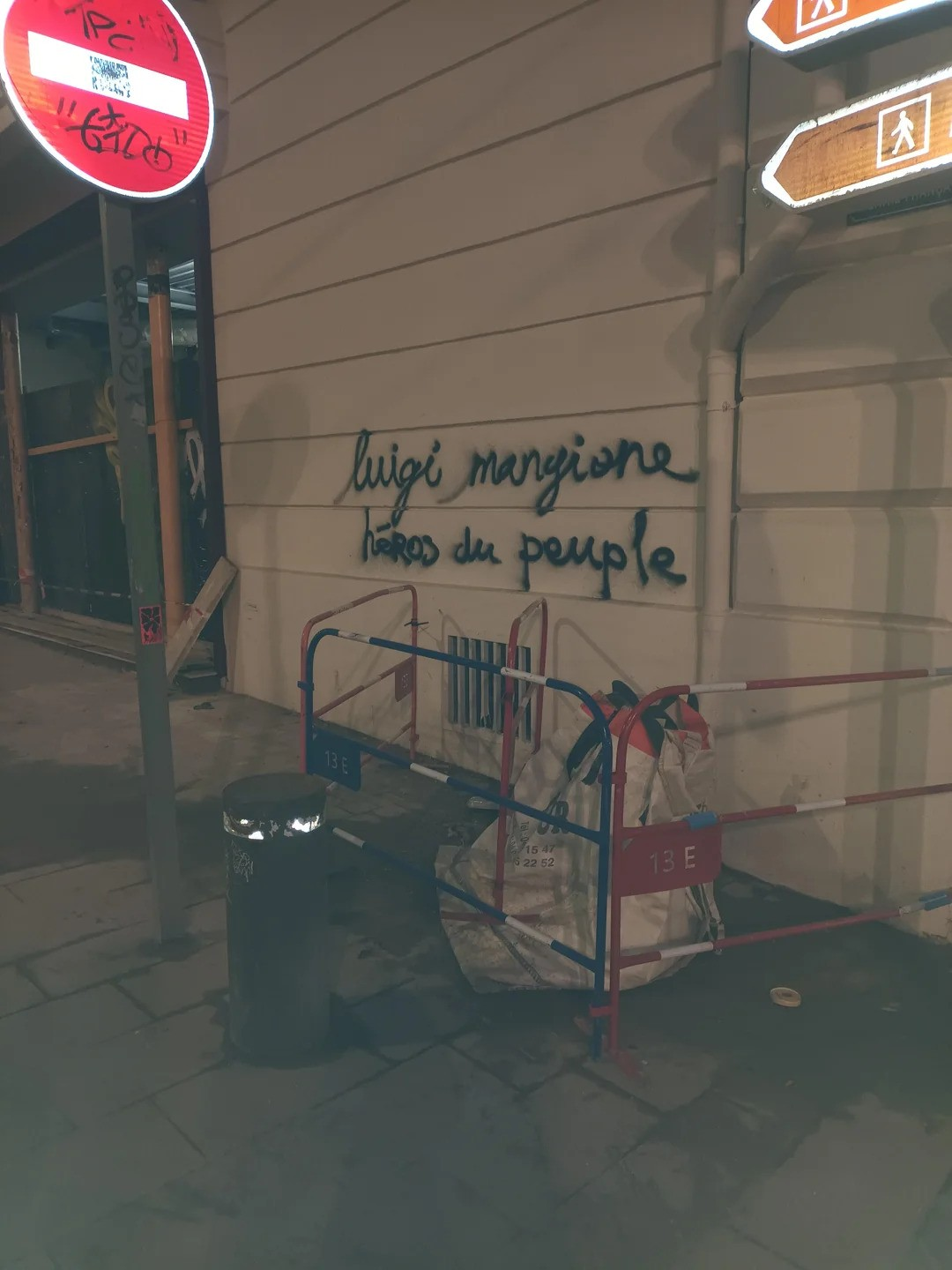
"Luigi Mangione, hero of the people" in Marseille, France

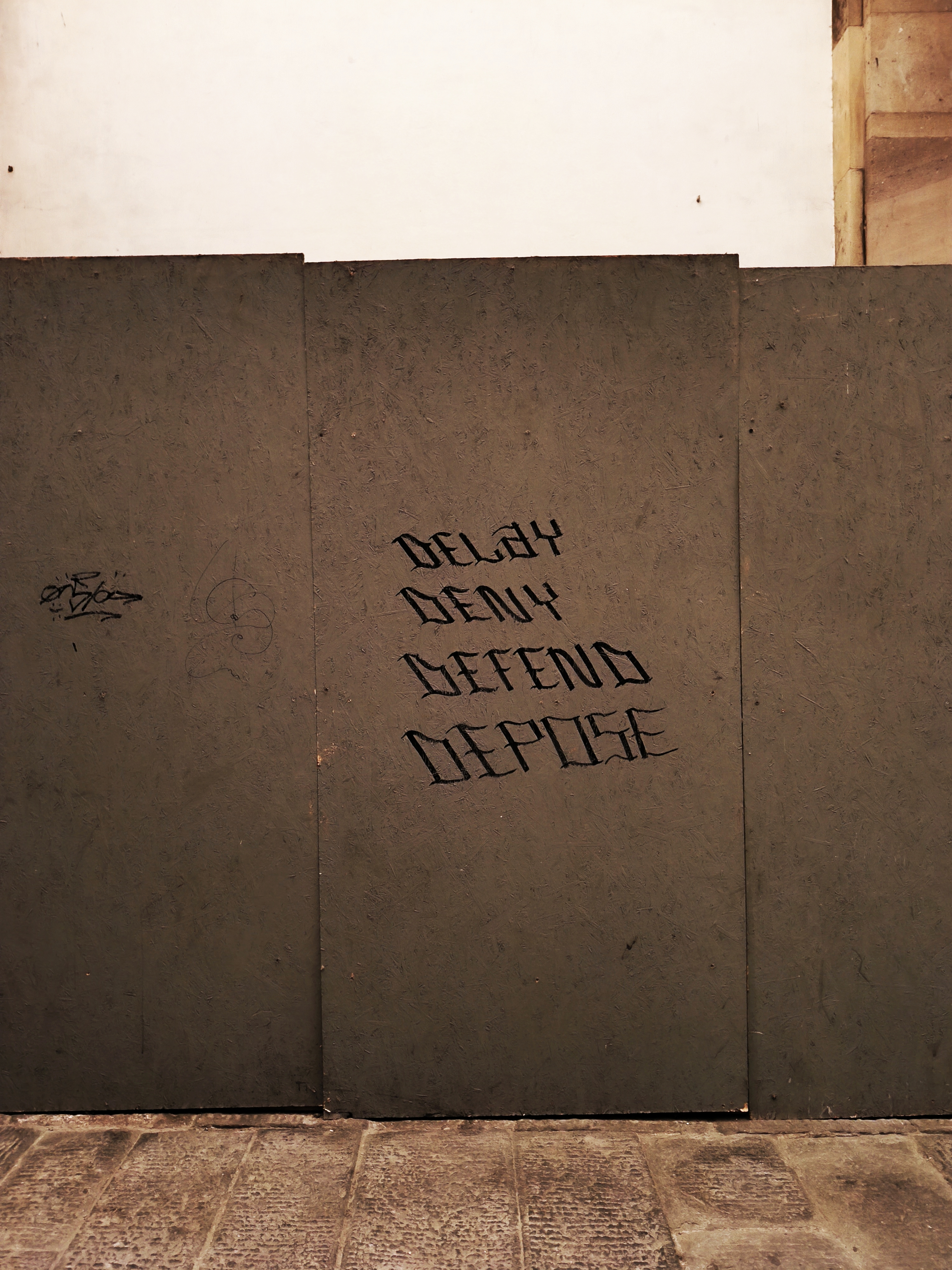
"Delay Deny Defend Depose" in Lucca, Italy

Rolling Stone described Mangione as the "most debated and polarizing murder suspect in recent history". He received significant online support, with many celebrating him as a folk hero and a modern-day Robin Hood. The hashtag "#FreeLuigi" and its variations have been shared over 50,000 times on Twitter by those advocating for his release. Images and memes have circulated online, and items and merchandise in support of Mangione were posted on e-commerce sites such as Etsy and Amazon.

Support for Mangione extended to street art, graffiti, and public signage, including a billboard in Riverside County, California, and a mural in Seattle. Mangione's fellow inmates at SCI Huntingdon in Pennsylvania were heard shouting "Free Luigi" from their cells during a live broadcast interview with NewsNation, and people gathered at the courthouses to express their support for Mangione during his court hearings. On February 14, 2025, Mangione thanked the public in his first official statement since his arrest, stating that "the support has transcended political, racial, and even class divisions".

Charlie Warzel of The Atlantic wrote that to some, Mangione is an "expression of the depth of righteous anger present in American life right now, a symbol of justified violence". Following the Thompson killing, anger erupted on social media platforms at Thompson, UnitedHealth, and the American health insurance system generally, with many praising the killing. The support Mangione has generated has been connected to the public's often negative view of the American health insurance industry and what many consider to be unfair claim denial practices that inflict harm; the case has amplified calls for health insurance reform. A December 2024 NORC at the University of Chicago poll found that most American adults believe that health insurance companies share a moderate amount or a great deal of responsibility for Thompson's death because of their denials for health care coverage and/or profits made by those companies.

Regarded as one of the "most polarizing figures in American pop culture" by The Guardian, public opinion on Mangione has been mixed and split along generational lines. A December 2024 Economist/YouGov poll found that 43% of American citizens held an unfavorable view of Mangione, while 21% viewed him favorably. Support for him was notably higher among citizens aged 18–29 and those identifying as very liberal, while older and more conservative individuals tended to view him unfavorably. Similarly, a December 2024 online poll by the Center for Strategic Politics found that 61% of respondents had a negative perception of Mangione, while 19% held a positive view. They found that opinions on him vary "dramatically" by age, with younger respondents expressing more favorable views than those over 45 and viewing Mangione "far more favorably" than Thompson and UnitedHealthcare.

The Mangione case has also been said to have inspired further acts of violence committed in his name. Prosecutors alleged that the man accused of starting the Palisades Fire in January 2025 was fascinated with Mangione and searched for Mangione-related news after Thompson's death using terms such as "free Luigi Mangione" and "lets take down all the billionaires". A warehouse in Los Angeles was allegedly set on fire in April 2026, causing more than $600 million in damage; authorities said the alleged perpetrator was "motivated by anti-capitalism sentiment" and likened himself to Mangione.

=== Perp walk ===
After being transported from Pennsylvania to New York on December 19, 2024, Mangione received a highly publicized perp walk, escorted by many heavily armed law enforcement officials and New York City mayor Eric Adams. Stanford Law School professor Robert Weisberg said: "The FBI and NYDA could have transported Mangione discreetly, but they opted for a public show". Some legal experts stated that the perp walk was a "blatant and unnecessary attempt at self-promotion". Javed Ali, a law professor at the University of Michigan, compared Mangione's perp walk with that of Timothy McVeigh, the perpetrator of the Oklahoma City bombing when he was arrested in 1995 in Perry, Oklahoma.

Policy director for the Justice Collaboratory at Yale Law School Jorge Camacho said: "In a case like Mangione's, where the suspect has garnered some sympathy and applause from people frustrated with greedy health-care insurance companies, the perp walk can backfire". Memes in support of Mangione circulated on social media, many of which compared his perp walk to the arrest of Jesus, perp walk scenes from Superman movies, and Renaissance paintings. During Mangione's New York court hearing on December 23, 2024, his defense attorney Karen Friedman Agnifilo said the perp walk was the "biggest staged perp walk I've ever seen in my career" and criticized it as "unnecessary" and "utterly political".

=== Physical appearance ===
Mangione has been noted for his perceived physical attractiveness, and Kara Alaimo, writing for Time, stated that he has become "somewhat of an online sex symbol".

After Mangione's Manhattan courtroom appearance on December 23, 2024, Maison Margiela trended on Twitter and Threads after social media users misidentified the brand of the burgundy sweater that Mangione was wearing. It was later determined that he was wearing a "washable Merino crewneck sweater" from Nordstrom, which sold out in one day. After his February 2025 court appearance, photographs of Mangione's shackled bare ankles in brown loafers went viral, with the search terms "luigi mangione loafers" and "luigi mangione ankles" spiking by 1,400% and 500%, respectively, on Google. In early September 2025, a product featuring an edited and AI-generated image of Mangione modelling a shirt was listed for sale by the Chinese online retailer Shein. Shein claimed that the image was provided by a third-party vendor and that it was immediately removed from its site upon discovery. An archived listing of the original advert from the Wayback Machine suggests that before its removal, the shirt had completely sold out in all sizes but one.

Regarding Mangione's online popularity, criminologist Diana Rickard told Women's Wear Daily: "What we see with Mangione is he has quickly become a folk hero and a fashion folk hero".

== In popular culture ==
Mangione has been the subject of multiple documentaries, news specials, and the satirical comedy musical Luigi: The Musical (2025). In September 2025, Ryan Murphy, creator of the Netflix true crime anthology Monster, expressed interest in creating a season of the show based on Mangione. He also has a song in Laibach's album Musick named after him.

Mangione has been referenced in TV shows and comedy sketches, including in the 2025 The Simpsons episode "¡The Fall Guy-Yi-Yi!", when Bart Simpson says, "What's the use of having a badass in the family if you can't brag about him? Now I know how the Mangiones feel."
