= 2009 in American television =

In American television in 2009, notable events included television show debuts, finales, cancellations, and new channel launches.

== Notable events ==
=== January ===
| Date | Event |
|---|---|
| 1 | After 51 years as an NBC affiliate, KBTV/Beaumont-Port Arthur, Texas joins the Fox network. The NBC affiliation moves over to the digital subchannel of ABC affiliate KBMT. |
| 3 | Fox replaces the 4Kids TV block, with the first two hours being returned to affiliates, and 10 am to noon EST becoming Weekend Marketplace infomercials. |
| 5 | NBC affiliate WGBC in Meridian, Mississippi switches its primary affiliation to Fox, taking the affiliation from WTOK-DT2. NBC programming then moves to WGBC-DT2. The move is made to allow Fox programs to be offered in HD. |
| 9 | Nickelodeon begins a year-long celebration of SpongeBob SquarePants tenth anniversary. |
| 15 | Hawaii became the first state in the United States to have all of its television stations switch to digital television. |
| 15 | William Petersen appears for the last time as a regular cast member on CBS's CSI: Crime Scene Investigation as Supervisor Gil Grissom. |
| 20 | The First inauguration of Barack Obama is broadcast live across all major American broadcast and cable news networks. It draws a combined domestic television audience of over 37.8 million viewers, making it one of the most-watched political events in U.S. history. |
| 26 | Illinois governor Rod Blagojevich goes on a media blitz appearing on NBC's The Today Show, ABC's The View, and CNN's Larry King Live while his impeachment trial continues in his homestate. Blagojevich is later removed from office on January 29. |

=== February ===
| Date | Event |
|---|---|
| 1 | Super Bowl XLIII, which saw the Pittsburgh Steelers defeat the Arizona Cardinals 27–23 and give the Steelers their history-making sixth Super Bowl win ever for the franchise, was televised live on NBC in the U.S. Immediately after the Super Bowl, the NBC comedy The Office airs an hour long two part episode called "Stress Relief". The episode was the most viewed episode of The Office, received 22.9 million viewers and received widespread acclaim. The episode was written by Paul Lieberstein and directed by Jeffrey Blitz. Time magazine would name it the best overall television episode of any series in 2009. |
| 1-2 | Nickelodeon quietly retires its' Nick Jr. and TEENick blocks so all of its' daytime programming can be branded under the Nickelodeon name. |
| 10 | MyNetworkTV announced that they would switch from a network to a syndication programming service. |
| 11 | President Barack Obama signed the DTV Delay Act into law, officially moving the digital television transition in the United States cutoff date to June 12, 2009. |
| 12 | Charter Communications files for Chapter 11 Bankruptcy protection. |
| 15 | On Fox, The Simpsons is broadcast in HD for the first time, with the season 20 episode "Take My Life, Please". The event also includes a new opening, during which Bart writes "HDTV is worth every cent" for this episode's chalkboard gag. |
| 17 | 368 American television stations permanently shut off their analog signals on the original February 17 date of the DTV transition in the United States and began broadcasting exclusively in digital. 53 stations qualify for nightlight service status, meaning they must use their analog signals only for DTV transition public service announcements and severe weather alerts. All others must wait until June 12 to go all digital (see DTV Delay Act for further details). |
| 20 | After 16 years on the air, the last episode of Late Night with Conan O'Brien airs on NBC. Conan's favorite band The White Stripes was the final guest. Will Ferrell (impersonating former U.S. President George W. Bush) and former sidekick/O'Brien's Tonight Show announcer Andy Richter made surprise appearances, and pre-recorded clips of John Mayer and Abe Vigoda were shown. Late Night leaves Studio 6A at NBC's Rockefeller Center studios in New York after 27 years. |
| 22 | The 81st Academy Awards presentation was televised live on ABC. Slumdog Millionaire won eight awards including Best Picture, and 14 other films won at least one award. 37 million viewers in the United States watched the ceremony. |

=== March ===
| Date | Event |
|---|---|
| 1 | The traditional Nielsen ratings February sweeps are moved to March. |
| 2 | Late Night with Jimmy Fallon premiered on NBC. The Roots is the house band. Oscar winner Robert De Niro, Grammy winner Van Morrison, and singer/actor Justin Timberlake were Jimmy's first guests. Former host Conan O'Brien also made a cameo appearance. Late Night moves to Studio 6B (the former WNBC-TV news studio) at NBC Studios in Rockefeller Center. |
| 16 | Ion Television affiliates launch their HD channel. |
| 19 | President Barack Obama appears on NBC's The Tonight Show with Jay Leno, marking the first time a sitting president has appeared on a late-night talk show. |
| 23 | American satellite television provider DirecTV paid $4 billion to extend its exclusive contract for the NFL Sunday Ticket package until 2014. After the 2014 season, DirecTV had exclusive U.S. rights for the package for 20 straight seasons, since the package's (and DirecTV's) inception in 1994. |

=== April ===
| Date | Event |
|---|---|
| 2 | The TV Guide Network announces that they would no longer carry local television listing grids on their channel. However, in 2010, they were still displayed only on local cable providers. |
| 2 | Emmy Award-winning medical drama ER airs its series finale on NBC after a one-hour retrospective. |
| 7 | The television special Charlie Brown's All-Stars returns to American television for the first time since 1982, airing on ABC. |
| 16 | Sportscaster John Madden announces his retirement at age 73. |
| 16 | On CBS, Bob Barker returns to the set of his former game show of 35 years, The Price Is Right, to promote his new book, Priceless Memories. |
| 20 | The CW arrives in Guam with the on-air debut of KTKB-LP. |
| 20 | The CW affiliate WLGA/Columbus, Georgia becomes an independent station. The CW affiliation moves to a subchannel for NBC affiliate WLTZ, known as CW Ga-Bama. |
| 27 | ABC launches an HD subchannel network called Live Well HD Network. The channel initially airs on its O&Os before expanding it to other affiliates a year later. |
| 28 | CBS's drama NCIS airs a two-part pilot for its spin-off series NCIS: Los Angeles when the first part of "Legend" airs on this night. The second part airs the following Tuesday. |

=== May ===
| Date | Event |
|---|---|
| 5 | The CW announces that it would give its Sunday night schedule back to its affiliates. Therefore, The CW only broadcast on the weekdays and Saturday mornings, until the Sunday slot was restored in 2018. |
| 6 | Noggin and The N become separate networks on Dish Network. |
| 16 | After 14 years, MADtv's series finale airs on Fox with host Fred Willard, and includes guest appearances by former cast members Alex Borstein, Mo Collins, Artie Lange, Will Sasso and Debra Wilson. |
| 20 | The CW aired the original series finale of The Game, which resulted in there being no scripted series (comedy or drama) on American network television with a predominantly African-American cast. |
| 20 | On Fox, Kris Allen won the eighth installment of American Idol. |
| 25 | Cartoon Network, for the first time, broadcasts the three movies of the popular anime series Sailor Moon; Sailor Moon R: The Movie, Sailor Moon S: The Movie, and Sailor Moon Super S: The Movie, after seven years of not airing in the United States. |

=== June ===
| Date | Event |
|---|---|
| 1 | The Tonight Show with Conan O'Brien premieres at 11:35 p.m. EDT on NBC, with Will Ferrell and Pearl Jam as the show's first guests. Tonight moves to Stage 1 at Universal Studios Hollywood in Universal City, California. |
| 12 | All remaining NTSC full-service television stations in the United States shut down their analog television services and began broadcasting digital television signals only (see DTV transition in the United States for further details). |
| 12 | Four months after the Steelers' Super Bowl win the city of Pittsburgh sees another championship with the Penguins winning the Stanley Cup their third in franchise history and their first since 1992. Game 7 was the last to be broadcast on analog television before switching to digital. |
| 25 | The "King of Pop" Michael Jackson dies at his Los Angeles home at the age of 50. |
| 29 | American cable news channel MSNBC launches its high definition version, becoming the last of the Big 3 cable news channels to do so. |
| 29 | The Michael Jackson-themed episode for American Idol (season 8) is re-aired on Fox due to his death on June 25. |

=== July ===
| Date | Event |
|---|---|
| 7 | A memorial service for Michael Jackson, who died on June 25, is broadcast live around the world, with an estimated audience of one billion. |
| 13 | New Vision Television files for Chapter 11 bankruptcy. |
| 13 | WLIO-DT2 in Lima, Ohio, previously a CW affiliate before simulcasting parent station WLIO, joins Fox (with MyNetworkTV as its secondary affiliation). Fox's former affiliate WOHL-CA, who had been sold to WLIO on February 5, would sign off on July 31 in preparation for a flash-cut to digital channel 35 (as WOHL-CD), and return to the air as an ABC affiliate (with CBS on DT2) on September 28. ABC and CBS's former affiliates (WLQP-LP and WLMO-LP) sign off their analog signals on that same date in preparation for a possible flash-cut to digital. |
| 14 | The 2009 MLB All-Star Game is broadcast on Fox. The ceremonial first pitch is thrown by President Barack Obama. |
| 27 | Ben Silverman, co-chairman of NBC Entertainment and Universal Media Studios, announced that he is leaving the company. |

=== August ===
| Date | Event |
|---|---|
| 4 | Paula Abdul confirms to her fans on her Twitter page that she departed as a judge for American Idol after eight seasons. |
| 5 | Laura Ling and Euna Lee, both Asian-American journalists for Current TV, are released from prison in North Korea through negotiations between the government and Bill Clinton. Both women were sentenced to 12 years of hard labor for accidentally crossing the border from China while doing a story in 2008. |
| 8 | Sonia Sotomayor's swearing in as United States Supreme Court Justice marks the first time that a televised event was shown live at the Supreme Court instead of the White House. |
| 9 | ABC airs Who Wants to Be a Millionaire for 11 episodes in primetime as an event to commemorate the 10th Anniversary of the show. The final episode, which aired on August 23, saw a contestant Ken Basin attempted unsuccessfully on the $1,000,000 final question (a similar situation would later be repeated on September 25, 2013, when Josina Reaves reached the final question and lost). |
| 13 | ABC announced that All My Children will move its production from New York City to Los Angeles in 2010. This marks the first time in its 40-year run that the serial switched studio production locations, and the first soap opera to do so since CBS' The Brighter Day in 1961. |
| 18 | Honolulu, Hawaii television outlets KGMB (CBS), KHNL (NBC) and KFVE (My Network TV) combine their operations under an SSA deal made between Raycom Media and MCG. As part of the deal, Raycom takes over KGMB's programming and newscast and swap channels with MCG, who oversee KFVE and move the station to KGMB's channel. |
| 22 | VH1 cancels the reality shows Megan Wants a Millionaire and I Love Money after Ryan Jenkins, a contestant on both shows, is charged with the murder of his ex-wife, swimsuit model Jasmine Fiore, and is later found dead himself in Hope, British Columbia. |
| 27 | Lifetime Entertainment Services, the parent company of Lifetime Television, is acquired by A&E Television Networks. |
| 28 | After 26 years on the air, and three years of only reruns, PBS Kids' broadcast rights to Reading Rainbow expire. |
| 31 | The Walt Disney Company, parent company of ABC, acquires Marvel Entertainment. |
| 31 | The Late Late Show with Craig Ferguson on CBS begins broadcasting in high-definition, along with a brand new opening, and a change to the theme song. |

=== September ===
| Date | Event |
|---|---|
| 1 | DirecTV removes sports channel Versus due to an ongoing carriage dispute about subscriber fees. |
| 1 | Freedom Communications, the parent company of WPEC/West Palm Beach, Florida and WTVC/Chattanooga, Tennessee, among others, files for Chapter 11 Bankruptcy. |
| 7 | ESPN celebrates its 30th anniversary with a special 90-minute edition of SportsCenter. |
| 9 | Ellen DeGeneres is named the successor to Paula Abdul as judge of American Idol. |
| 10 | John Stossel leaves ABC and his co-hosting duties at 20/20 to join the Fox Business Network and Fox News Channel. |
| 13 | The NFL introduces Red Zone Channel, a special channel with extended highlights available during the regular season. AT&T U-Verse, Comcast, Dish Network, and Verizon FiOS are the first carriers to provide the new channel. |
| 13 | The final two episodes of King of the Hill air on Fox. Four unaired episodes would later be shown in syndication and on Adult Swim. |
| 13 | The 2009 MTV Video Music Awards airs on MTV, notable moments include a tribute to Michael Jackson and Kanye West interrupting Taylor Swift's speech. |
| 14 | Liberman Broadcasting launches a new Spanish-language television network called Estrella TV. |
| 14 | For the first time in years, NBC launches a prime-time weeknight talk/variety show with Jay Leno as host, titled The Jay Leno Show, which airs during the 10:00 p.m. Eastern/9:00 p.m. Central time slots but was canceled after one season. |
| 14 | Barney & Friends is broadcast in HD for the first time. |
| 16 | For the first time ever on television, The Newlywed Game features a gay couple on their show. George Takei and his partner Brad Altman are the celebrity newlyweds that make history on GSN's version of the game show. |
| 18 | Guiding Light, a CBS soap opera that began on radio in 1937 before moving to television in 1952, airs its final episode on the network. CBS retains the time slot and uses it to launch a revival of Let's Make a Deal on October 5. |
| 18 | Astrophysicist and former Nobel laureate George Smoot appeared in Fox's game show Are You Smarter than a 5th Grader?, and became the second contestant (after Kathy Cox) to win the $1 million grand prize. |
| 19 | KEWLopolis, CBS's Saturday morning children's programming block, is renamed Cookie Jar TV by the Cookie Jar Group (who had purchased DIC Entertainment). |
| 20 | Barack Obama makes history by appearing on five Sunday news/talk shows on the same day: CBS's Face the Nation, ABC's This Week, CNN's State of the Union with John King, NBC's Meet The Press and on Univision. |
| 20 | Jimmy Mulville, head of the British production company Hat Trick Productions, announced plans to make a pilot for an American version of the British satirical panel game Have I Got News for You. |
| 20 | Mad Men wins Outstanding Drama Series and 30 Rock wins Outstanding Comedy Series at the 61st Primetime Emmy Awards, hosted by Neil Patrick Harris and televised by CBS. |
| 21 | President Barack Obama appears on CBS's Late Show with David Letterman, marking the first time a sitting U.S. president has been host David Letterman's guest. |
| 22 | ABC World News Now on the ABC television network becomes the first overnight newscast to broadcast in high definition. |
| 25 | The Tonight Show host Conan O'Brien suffers a concussion after hitting his head on the studio floor while taping a stunt with guest Teri Hatcher. Production on that day's episode is halted, and a rerun airs on NBC in its place. O'Brien returned to work the following Monday. |
| 27 | The Season 21 premiere of The Simpsons episode, "Homer the Whopper," establishes the series longest-running prime-time entertainment program in history (overtaking Gunsmoke). |
| 28 | MyNetworkTV converts from a broadcast television network to a syndicated programming service due to disappointing ratings in their original programming, relying mostly on syndicated repeats of recent broadcast and cable television series. |
| 28 | All four Nickelodeon networks (including the Nick@Nite block and Nicktoons) are rebranded with new universal logos, replacing Nick's iconic orange shape logo that had been in use since 1984. Viacom re-brands Noggin as Nick Jr., and The N as TeenNick. Both of the new channels' names, and much of their programming, are taken from former programming blocks on Nickelodeon. In addition, BET J is quietly rebranded as Centric. |

=== October ===
| Date | Event |
|---|---|
| 1 | David Letterman admits on his Late Show to having sexual relationships with female members of his staff. He also tells the audience that he wrote a fraudulent check for $2 million to a 48 Hours producer who planned to blackmail him on the matter. |
| 1 | CBS affiliate KEYE-TV in Austin, Texas relaunches KEYE-DT2 as a Telemundo affiliate, displacing the Retro Television Network and giving Austin its first locally based Telemundo affiliate. |
| 5 | ESPN's broadcast of Monday Night Football between the Green Bay Packers and Minnesota Vikings becomes the most-watched cable television sports program in history, with 15 million homes tuning in to see Vikings quarterback Brett Favre face his former team for the first time. The Vikings won the game 30–23 and Favre became the first quarterback in NFL history to beat all 32 teams. |
| 14 | News Corporation announces that Fox Reality Channel would be replaced by Nat Geo Wild in March 2010. |
| 21 | Nickelodeon (Viacom) acquires global rights to Teenage Mutant Ninja Turtles from Mirage Studios for $60 million. |
| 25 | Steve Phillips is fired by ESPN after the baseball analyst admits to having an affair with Brooke Hundley, a 22-year-old production assistant at the sports network. Hundley, who was later given a court restraining order after trying to stalk Phillips, his soon-to-be-ex-wife and son, was also fired. |
| 26 | The newscasts of Honolulu television outlets KGMB and KHNL/KFVE are combined into one, becoming "Hawaii News Now." KGMB and KHNL will simulcast their early morning show "Sunrise", 5 pm and 10 pm newscast, with the exception of KGMB's 7 am portion of "Sunrise" and 6 pm newscast, KHNL's relocated 5:30 pm newscast and during the 7 am hour when they start airing Today, and during separate programming. KFVE's 6:30 pm and 9 pm newscasts remain intact. Also effective with this move is KGMB moving from DT channel 8 (PSIP RF channel 9) to DT 23 (PSIP 5) and vice versa for KFVE |
| 29 | Washington, D.C. station WJLA-TV, an affiliate of ABC, airs a local special "Touch of Life: The Guide to Breast Self Examination" featuring uncensored self-breast exams. The special is also continued the next day. |
| 30 | For the first time in its 27-year history, The Weather Channel begins showing weekly weather-related movies, including The Perfect Storm and Misery. |

=== November ===
| Date | Event |
|---|---|
| 4 | Game 6 of the World Series airs on Fox. The New York Yankees defeated the Philadelphia Phillies. This is the team's 27th title. It is also their first series clinch at the newly built Yankee Stadium. Ever since then, the Yankees would not appear in another World Series for the rest of the following decade until the 2024 ALCS where they defeat the Cleveland Guardians, thus ending a 15-year drought from winning the pennant. |
| 5 | Scripps Networks Interactive pays $1.1 billion for a 65% share of Travel Channel. |
| 10 | First Lady Michelle Obama appears on the season premiere of Sesame Street, commemorating the PBS show's 40th anniversary. |
| 11 | CNN anchor Lou Dobbs, a mainstay at the channel since its start in 1980, announces he is leaving the network effective immediately. |
| 16 | Who Wants to Be a Millionaire held a special, Tournament of 10 as part of the tenth anniversary of the series, where ten former contestants with the highest winnings during the syndicated run were invited to answer the $1 million question, and the prize is awarded to only one contestant if the contestant holds the highest prior winnings (which was determined by seed) answered the question correctly. The run ended on November 20, when Sam Murray won the $1 million prize as he was the only contestant to answer the $1 million question correctly. |
| 19 | Oprah Winfrey announces that she would end her talk show in 2011, after its 25th season. |
| 26 | The NFL Network airs an expletive uttered by Denver Broncos head coach Josh McDaniels during the team's Thanksgiving night football game with the New York Giants. Play-by-play announcer Bob Papa apologized for the network's gaffe later in the broadcast. |

=== December ===
| Date | Event |
|---|---|
| 1 | The 2009 Victoria's Secret Fashion Show is broadcast on CBS. 8.3 million people tune in. |
| 3 | It is announced that NBC Universal would become a joint venture between General Electric and Comcast, with GE retaining a 49 percent stake in the company and buying current NBC partner Vivendi's share. Comcast, meanwhile, takes a 51 percent controlling interest. The deal is subject to government approval. |
| 7 | Comstar Media acquires semi-religious television and radio network FamilyNet. |
| 7 | The NewsHour with Jim Lehrer is rebranded as PBS NewsHour on PBS after 14 years of the name. |
| 8 | CBS announced that they are canceling As the World Turns (the last of the Procter & Gamble soaps) after more than 50 years on the air. The series ends its run on September 17, 2010, and is replaced four weeks after that with The Talk. |
| 11 | After almost 11 years, Diane Sawyer leaves ABC's Good Morning America to succeed Charles Gibson as anchor of ABC World News beginning December 21. Chief political correspondent George Stephanopoulos replaces Sawyer as GMA co-anchor beginning on December 14. |
| 15 | The FCC considers an order that would close the "terrestrial loophole" which keeps fiber-delivered channels such as Comcast SportsNet Philadelphia and 4SD off of satellite TV systems. |
| 18 | Charles Gibson retires as anchor of ABC World News. The following Monday, Diane Sawyer replaces him as anchor. |
| 23 | E! rehires Joan Rivers to host their specials in 2010. |
| 28 | DirecTV launched a new satellite which, when fully installed, gives the provider the capacity of up to 80 more HD channels. It became fully operational early in the 2nd quarter of 2010. |
| 31 | DirecTV and Rainbow Media reach a last-minute carriage renewal agreement, keeping Rainbow's channels AMC, WE tv, IFC, Fuse TV, SundanceTV, MSG Network and MSG Plus on the satellite system. |

== Programs ==
=== Debuts ===
| Date | Debut | Network | Source |
|---|---|---|---|
| January 3 | Huntik: Secrets & Seekers | The CW4Kids | |
| January 3 | Kamen Rider: Dragon Knight | The CW4Kids | |
| January 7 | 13: Fear Is Real | The CW | |
| January 8 | Greg Behrendt's Wake Up Call | Soapnet | |
| January 9 | Howie Do It | NBC | |
| January 12 | Hannity | Fox News | |
| January 18 | State of the Union with John King | CNN | |
| January 18 | United States of Tara | Showtime | |
| January 19 | The Electric Company | PBS Kids Go! | |
| January 21 | Lie to Me | Fox | |
| January 23 | Wolverine and the X-Men | Nicktoons Network | |
| January 26 | Olivia | Nickelodeon/Nick Jr. Channel | |
| January 26 | Trust Me | TNT | |
| January 27 | Toddlers & Tiaras | TLC | |
| February 2 | RuPaul's Drag Race | Logo | |
| February 2 | For the Love of Ray J | VH1 | |
| February 4 | Billy the Exterminator | A&E | |
| February 8 | The CollegeHumor Show | MTV | |
| February 8 | Rob Dyrdek's Fantasy Factory | MTV | |
| February 8 | Sonny with a Chance | Disney Channel | |
| February 11 | Important Things with Demetri Martin | Comedy Central | |
| February 13 | Dollhouse | Fox | |
| February 13 | Aaron Stone | Disney XD | |
| February 13 | Jimmy Two-Shoes | Disney XD | |
| February 13 | Kid vs. Kat | Disney XD | |
| March 2 | Late Night with Jimmy Fallon | NBC | |
| March 7 | League of Super Evil | Cartoon Network | |
| March 9 | Castle | ABC | |
| March 11 | The Chopping Block | NBC | |
| March 15 | Kings | NBC | |
| March 18 | Better Off Ted | ABC | |
| March 23 | Table for 12 | TLC | |
| March 26 | In the Motherhood | ABC | |
| March 29 | The No. 1 Ladies' Detective Agency | HBO | |
| April 4 | Special Agent Oso | Playhouse Disney | |
| April 6 | The Ed Show | MSNBC | |
| April 6 | Surviving Suburbia | ABC | |
| April 7 | Deadliest Warrior | Spike | |
| April 8 | The Unusuals | ABC | |
| April 9 | Parks and Recreation | NBC | |
| April 9 | Southland | NBC | |
| April 9 | Thursday Night Baseball | MLB Network | |
| April 9 | Harper's Island | CBS | |
| April 15 | The Cougar | TV Land | |
| April 15 | PitchMen | Discovery Channel | |
| April 16 | WWE Superstars | WGN America | |
| April 17 | Stranger Among Bears | Animal Planet | |
| April 18 | World's Strictest Parents | CMT | |
| April 19 | Cake Boss | TLC | |
| April 19 | Sit Down, Shut Up | Fox | |
| April 24 | Iron Man: Armored Adventures | Nicktoons Network | |
| April 26 | Daisy of Love | VH1 | |
| May 2 | Jonas | Disney Channel | |
| May 11 | Charm School with Ricki Lake | VH1 | |
| May 19 | Glee | Fox | |
| May 26 | Mental | Fox | |
| May 26 | Hitched or Ditched | The CW | |
| May 31 | DJ & the Fro | MTV | |
| June 1 | The Tonight Show with Conan O'Brien | NBC | |
| June 4 | The Listener | NBC | |
| June 4 | Hollywood's Best Film Directors | Reelz | |
| June 4 | Royal Pains | USA Network | |
| June 4 | Tosh.0 | Comedy Central | |
| June 7 | Web Soup | G4 | |
| June 8 | Nurse Jackie | Showtime | |
| June 9 | The Wrong Door | IFC | |
| June 10 | Top Chef Masters | Bravo | |
| June 11 | Raising Sextuplets | WE tv | |
| June 14 | Hammertime | A&E | |
| June 15 | It's On with Alexa Chung | MTV | |
| June 15 | Joe Buck Live | HBO | |
| June 15 | Zeke and Luther | Disney XD | |
| June 15 | Silent Library | MTV | |
| June 16 | Hawthorne | TNT | |
| June 16 | The Lazy Environmentalist | Sundance TV | |
| June 17 | The Othersiders | Cartoon Network | |
| June 17 | Survive This | Cartoon Network | |
| June 19 | Jeffery & Cole Casserole | Logo | |
| June 20 | BrainRush | Cartoon Network | |
| June 20 | Destroy Build Destroy | Cartoon Network | |
| June 21 | Merlin | NBC | |
| June 22 | Make It or Break It | ABC Family | |
| June 23 | NYC Prep | Bravo | |
| June 24 | The Philanthropist | NBC | |
| June 29 | Dance Your Ass Off | Oxygen | |
| July 1 | Monsters Inside Me | Animal Planet | |
| July 7 | 10 Things I Hate About You | ABC Family | |
| July 7 | The Great American Road Trip | NBC | |
| July 7 | Warehouse 13 | Syfy | |
| July 8 | Time Team America | PBS | |
| July 10 | The Assistants | TeenNick | |
| July 12 | Drop Dead Diva | Lifetime | |
| July 14 | Miami Social | Bravo | |
| July 15 | Dark Blue | TNT | |
| July 15 | Michael & Michael Have Issues | Comedy Central | |
| July 16 | Stoked | Cartoon Network | |
| July 16 | Watch What Happens: Live | Bravo | |
| July 17 | Catch It Keep It | Science Channel | |
| July 19 | Pawn Stars | History Channel | |
| July 20 | Dating in the Dark | ABC | |
| July 20 | Three Sheets | Fine Living | |
| July 20 | Wake Up with Al | The Weather Channel | |
| July 21 | The Colony | Discovery Channel | |
| July 21 | Ruby & The Rockits | ABC Family | |
| July 25 | Being Human | BBC America | |
| July 28 | More to Love | Fox | |
| July 31 | Lock n' Load with R. Lee Ermey | History Channel | |
| August 1 | Face the Ace | NBC | |
| August 2 | Defying Gravity | ABC | |
| August 2 | Megan Wants a Millionaire | VH1 | |
| August 4 | Addicted to Beauty | Oxygen | |
| August 5 | Giuliana and Bill | Style Network | |
| August 5 | How'd You Get So Rich? | TV Land | |
| August 5 | Make My Day | TV Land | |
| August 9 | Shark Tank | ABC | |
| August 9 | There Goes the Neighborhood | CBS | |
| August 15 | Househusbands of Hollywood | Fox Reality Channel | |
| August 16 | Kourtney and Kim Take Miami | E! | |
| August 17 | Glenn Martin, DDS | Nick at Nite | |
| August 18 | Shaq Vs. | ABC | |
| August 24 | The Fresh Beat Band | Nickelodeon/Nick Jr. Channel | |
| August 24 | Where Is Warehouse Mouse? | Playhouse Disney | |
| August 29 | Frankie & Neffe | BET | |
| August 29 | Hot Wheels Battle Force 5 | Cartoon Network | |
| September 5 | Angelina Ballerina: The Next Steps | PBS Kids | |
| September 7 | Dinosaur Train | PBS Kids | |
| September 7 | Melrose Place | The CW | |
| September 7 | Coolfuel | Planet Green | |
| September 9 | Planet Mechanics | Planet Green | |
| September 10 | The Vampire Diaries | The CW | |
| September 12 | The Troop | Nickelodeon | |
| September 14 | The Dr. Oz Show | Syndication | |
| September 14 | The Jay Leno Show | NBC | |
| September 16 | The Beautiful Life | The CW | |
| September 17 | Archer | FX | |
| September 17 | Community | NBC | |
| September 19 | Busytown Mysteries | Cookie Jar TV | |
| September 19 | Noonbory and the Super Seven | Cookie Jar TV | |
| September 19 | RollBots | The CW4Kids | |
| September 19 | Being Ian | Qubo | |
| September 19 | Class of the Titans | Qubo | |
| September 19 | Spliced | Qubo | |
| September 20 | Bored to Death | HBO | |
| September 21 | Amanpour | CNN | |
| September 21 | Accidentally on Purpose | CBS | |
| September 22 | NCIS: Los Angeles | CBS | |
| September 22 | The Forgotten | ABC | |
| September 22 | The Good Wife | CBS | |
| September 23 | Cougar Town | ABC | |
| September 23 | Eastwick | ABC | |
| September 23 | Mercy | NBC | |
| September 23 | Modern Family | ABC | |
| September 24 | FlashForward | ABC | |
| September 25 | Brothers | Fox | |
| September 26 | The Brian McKnight Show | Syndication | |
| September 27 | The Cleveland Show | Fox | |
| September 27 | Titan Maximum | Adult Swim | |
| September 28 | BrainSurge | Nickelodeon | |
| September 28 | Trauma | NBC | |
| September 29 | The Joy Behar Show | HLN | |
| September 30 | Hank | ABC | |
| September 30 | The Middle | ABC | |
| October 2 | Stargate Universe | Syfy | |
| October 3 | SuperFetch | Animal Planet | |
| October 3 | Top 20 Countdown: Most Shocking | truTV | |
| October 4 | Dallas Divas & Daughters | Bravo | |
| October 4 | Three Rivers | CBS | |
| October 5 | The Mo'Nique Show | BET | |
| October 5 | Sherri | Lifetime | |
| October 5 | Jungle Junction | Playhouse Disney | |
| October 6 | Ghost Lab | Discovery Channel | |
| October 7 | Secret Girlfriend | Comedy Central | |
| October 9 | I'm Alive | Animal Planet | |
| October 10 | Fight Camp 360: Inside The Super Six World Boxing Classic | Showtime | |
| October 12 | Fanboy & Chum Chum | Nickelodeon | |
| October 18 | On the Case with Paula Zahn | Investigation Discovery | |
| October 19 | All Worked Up | truTV | |
| October 21 | The 100 Mile Challenge | Planet Green | |
| October 21 | Living with Ed | Planet Green | |
| October 21 | Nature, Inc. | Planet Green | |
| October 21 | Lock N' Load | Showtime | |
| October 22 | The Jeff Dunham Show | Comedy Central | |
| October 23 | White Collar | USA Network | |
| October 27 | Monica: Still Standing | BET | |
| October 29 | The League | FX | |
| October 30 | Pit Bulls & Parolees | Animal Planet | |
| November 2 | The Garfield Show | Cartoon Network | |
| November 3 | V | ABC | |
| November 7 | The Wanda Sykes Show | Fox | |
| November 9 | Lopez Tonight | TBS | |
| November 9 | Guess with Jess | Qubo | |
| November 15 | The Prisoner | AMC | |
| November 27 | I'm in the Band | Disney XD | |
| November 28 | Big Time Rush | Nickelodeon | |
| December 3 | BBQ Pitmasters | TLC | |
| December 3 | Jersey Shore | MTV | |
| December 6 | Alice | Syfy | |
| December 7 | Men of a Certain Age | TNT | |
| December 9 | Campus PD | G4 | |
| December 12 | American Ninja Warrior | G4 | |
| December 13 | The Jacksons: A Family Dynasty | A&E | |
| December 14 | The Sing-Off | NBC | |
| December 19 | CHRISJayify | Lifetime | |
| December 29 | One Big Happy Family | TLC | |

=== Entering syndication this year ===
! Show || Seasons || In production || Source |- |Bones||4||rowspan=1|Yes|| |- |Criminal Minds||4||rowspan=1|Yes|| |- |Everybody Hates Chris||4||rowspan=1|No|| |- |Ghost Whisperer||4||rowspan=1|Yes|| |- |Grey's Anatomy||4||rowspan=1|Yes|| |- |The Hills||5||rowspan=1|Yes|| |- |Laguna Beach: The Real Orange County||3||rowspan=1|No|| |- |Law & Order: Special Victims Unit||10||rowspan=1|Yes|| |- |My Name is Earl||4||rowspan=1|No|| |- |The Office||5||rowspan=1|Yes|| |}

=== Changes of network affiliation ===
| Show | Moved from | Moved to | Source |
|---|---|---|---|
| Glenn Beck | Headline News | Fox News Channel | |
| Judge Jeanine Pirro | The CW Daytime | Syndication | |
| Let's Make a Deal | NBC | CBS | |
| Medium | NBC | CBS | |
| Scrubs | NBC | ABC | |
| The Singing Bee | NBC | CMT | |
| Nanny 911 | Fox | CMT | |
| Power Rangers | Jetix | ABC Kids | |
| Yin Yang Yo! | Jetix | Disney XD | |
| The Spectacular Spider-Man | The CW4Kids | Disney XD | |
| Chaotic | 4Kids TV and Jetix | Cartoon Network and The CW4Kids | |
| Johnny Test | Kids WB | Cartoon Network | |
| I'm a Celebrity... Get Me Out of Here! | ABC | NBC | |
| Project Runway | Bravo | Lifetime | |
| The Wiggles | Playhouse Disney | PBS Kids Sprout | |
| Three Sheets | MOJO HD | FLN | |
| Imus in the Morning | RFD TV | Fox Business Network | |
| The Tyra Banks Show | Syndication | The CW Daytime | |
| Soul Train Music Awards | WGN America and Syndication | Centric | |
| Are You Smarter than a 5th Grader? | Fox | Syndication | |
| Living With Ed | HGTV | Planet Green | |

=== Returning this year ===
| Show | Previous network | Last aired | New network | Returning | Source |
|---|---|---|---|---|---|
| Nanny 911 | Fox | 2007 | Country Music Television | January | |
| Austin Stevens: Snakemaster (as Austin Stevens Adventures) | Animal Planet | 2007 | Same | February | |
| I'm a Celebrity...Get Me Out of Here! | ABC | 2003 | NBC | June | |
| Who Wants to Be a Millionaire (primetime) | ABC | 2002 | Same | August | |
| Let's Make a Deal | NBC | 2003 | CBS | October 5 | |
| Soul Train Music Awards | WGN America and Syndication | 2008 | Centric | November | |
| Johnny Test | Kids WB | 2008 | Cartoon Network | November 10 | |

=== Milestone episodes ===
| Show | Network | Episode# | Episode title | Episode air date | Source |
|---|---|---|---|---|---|
| Stargate Atlantis | Syfy | 100th | "Enemy at the Gate" (Series Finale) | January 9 | |
| Without A Trace | CBS | 100th | "Friends and Neighbors" | February 3 | |
| Family Guy | FOX | 10th Anniversary | "Ocean's Three and a Half" | February 15 | |
| The Simpsons | FOX | 20th Anniversary | "In the Name of the Grandfather" | March 22 | |
| CSI Crime Scene Investigation | CBS | 200th | "Mascara" | April 2 | |
| King of the Hill | FOX | 250th | "Serves Me Right for Giving General George S. Patton the Bathroom Key" | April 26 | |
| Lost | ABC | 100th | "The Variable" | April 29 | |
| The Fairly OddParents | Nickelodeon | 100th | "Wishology! The Final Ending" | May 3 | |
| Grey's Anatomy | ABC | 100th | "What a Difference a Day Makes" | May 7 | |
| The Office | NBC | 100th | "Company Picnic" | May 14 | |
| SpongeBob SquarePants | VH1 | 10th Anniversary | "Square Roots: The Story of SpongeBob SquarePants" | July 14 | |
| SpongeBob SquarePants | Nickelodeon | 10th Anniversary | SpongeBob's Truth or Square | November 6 | |
| America's Next Top Model | The CW | 150th | "The Early Bird Gets a Makeover" | September 9 | |
| Law & Order: Special Victims Unit | NBC | 10th Anniversary | "Unstable" | September 23 | |
| Medium | CBS | 100th | "Baby Fever" | October 23 | |
| Ed, Edd n Eddy | Cartoon Network | 10th Anniversary | Ed, Edd n Eddy's Big Picture Show | November 8 | |
| Criminal Minds | CBS | 100th | "100" | November 25 | |
| Power Rangers | ABC Kids | 700th | "Danger and Destiny, Part 2" | December 26 | |

=== Ending this year ===
| Date | Show | Channel | Debut | Status |
|---|---|---|---|---|
| January 9 | The Big Spin | Syndication | 1985 | Cancelled |
| January 9 | Hannity & Colmes | Fox News Channel | 1996 | Cancelled |
| January 9 | Lipstick Jungle | NBC | 2008 | Cancelled |
| January 9 | Stargate Atlantis | Syfy | 2004 | Cancelled |
| January 11 | Late Edition with Wolf Blitzer | CNN | 1993 | Cancelled |
| January 18 | Viva Piñata | 4Kids TV/CW4Kids | 2006 | Cancelled |
| January 19 | Momma's Boys | NBC | 2008 | Cancelled |
| January 23 | Disney's Really Short Report | Disney Channel | 2007 | Cancelled |
| January 24 | Game Show in My Head | CBS | 2009 | Cancelled |
| January 24 | Tak and the Power of Juju | Nickelodeon | 2007 | Cancelled |
| January 25 | The Drinky Crow Show | Adult Swim | 2007 | Cancelled |
| January 26 | Superstars of Dance | NBC | 2009 | Cancelled |
| January 31 | Crusoe | NBC | 2008 | Cancelled |
| February 2 | Bromance | MTV | 2008 | Cancelled |
| February 2 | The X Effect | MTV | 2007 | Cancelled |
| February 3 | A Double Shot at Love | MTV | 2008 | Cancelled |
| February 5 | The Principal's Office | truTV | 2008 | Cancelled |
| February 5 | Greg Behrendt's Wake Up Call | SoapNet | 2009 | Cancelled |
| February 19 | Cheat! | G4 | 2002 | Cancelled |
| February 20 | 13: Fear Is Real | The CW | 2009 | Cancelled |
| February 20 | Late Night with Conan O'Brien | NBC | 1993 | Ended |
| February 24 | 10 Items or Less | TBS | 2006 | Cancelled |
| February 24 | Privileged | The CW | 2008 | Cancelled |
| February 28 | Sushi Pack | CBS | 2007 | Cancelled |
| March 4 | Knight Rider | NBC | 2008 | Cancelled |
| March 7 | Gone Country | CMT | 2008 | Cancelled |
| March 8 | The L Word | Showtime | 2004 | Ended |
| March 10 | Homeland Security USA | ABC | 2009 | Cancelled |
| March 12 | Kath & Kim | NBC | 2008 | Cancelled |
| March 15 | Hole in the Wall (returned in 2010) | Fox | 2008 | Cancelled |
| March 15 | The CollegeHumor Show | MTV | 2009 | Cancelled |
| March 16 | Kyle XY | ABC Family | 2006 | Cancelled |
| March 17 | Orangutan Island | Animal Planet | 2007 | Cancelled |
| March 20 | Battlestar Galactica | Syfy | 2004 | Ended |
| March 22 | Flight of the Conchords | HBO | 2007 | Cancelled |
| March 25 | The Chopping Block | NBC | 2009 | Cancelled |
| March 25 | Life with Derek | Disney Channel | 2005 | Cancelled |
| March 28 | D. L. Hughley Breaks the News | CNN | 2008 | Cancelled |
| March 30 | The Replacements | Disney Channel | 2006 | Cancelled |
| March 31 | Schoolhouse Rock! | Disney DVD | 1973 | Cancelled |
| March 31 | DEA | Spike | 2008 | Cancelled |
| April 1 | Life on Mars | ABC | 2008 | Cancelled |
| April 2 | Eleventh Hour | CBS | 2008 | Cancelled |
| April 2 | ER | NBC | 1994 | Ended |
| April 6 | Storm Hawks | Cartoon Network | 2007 | Cancelled |
| April 7 | Trust Me | TNT | 2009 | Cancelled |
| April 8 | Life | NBC | 2007 | Cancelled |
| April 10 | Terminator: The Sarah Connor Chronicles | Fox | 2008 | Cancelled |
| April 17 | Xavier: Renegade Angel | Adult Swim | 2007 | Cancelled |
| April 18 | Yin Yang Yo! | Disney XD | 2006 | Cancelled |
| April 19 | As the Bell Rings | Disney Channel | 2007 | Cancelled |
| April 19 | Rock of Love with Bret Michaels | VH1 | 2007 | Cancelled |
| April 23 | The Beast | A&E | 2009 | Cancelled |
| May 1 | Howie Do It | NBC | 2009 | Cancelled |
| May 2 | My Life as a Teenage Robot | Nicktoons | 2003 | Cancelled |
| May 3 | Foster's Home for Imaginary Friends | Cartoon Network | 2004 | Ended |
| May 8 | Everybody Hates Chris (returned in 2024) | The CW | 2005 | Ended |
| May 10 | The Unit | CBS | 2006 | Canceled |
| May 13 | Room Raiders | MTV | 2003 | Canceled |
| May 14 | My Name Is Earl | NBC | 2005 | Canceled |
| May 15 | Prison Break (returned in 2017) | Fox | 2005 | Canceled |
| May 15 | The Game (returned in 2011) | The CW | 2006 | Canceled |
| May 16 | Talkshow with Spike Feresten | Fox | 2006 | Canceled |
| May 16 | Mad TV (returned in 2016) | Fox | 1995 | Canceled |
| May 19 | Without a Trace | CBS | 2002 | Canceled |
| May 23 | Mr. Meaty | Nicktoons | 2006 | Canceled |
| May 23 | Transformers: Animated | Cartoon Network | 2007 | Ended |
| May 26 | Reaper | The CW | 2007 | Cancelled |
| May 28 | This American Life | Syndication | 2007 | Cancelled |
| May 29 | Eye for an Eye | Syndication | 2003 | Cancelled |
| May 29 | The Tonight Show with Jay Leno (returned in 2010) | NBC | 1992 | Ended |
| June 2 | According to Jim | ABC | 2001 | Cancelled |
| June 3 | The Cougar | TV Land | 2009 | Cancelled |
| June 3 | Make Me a Supermodel | Bravo | 2008 | Cancelled |
| June 4 | Escape to Chimp Eden | Animal Planet | 2008 | Cancelled |
| June 6 | Worst Week | CBS | 2008 | Cancelled |
| June 6 | Nanny 911 | CMT | 2004 | Cancelled |
| June 12 | Best Week Ever (returned in 2014) | VH1 | 2004 | Cancelled |
| June 12 | The Morning Show with Mike and Juliet | Syndication | 2007 | Cancelled |
| June 13 | The Naked Brothers Band | Nickelodeon | 2007 | Cancelled |
| June 13 | Pushing Daisies | ABC | 2007 | Cancelled |
| June 14 | Million Dollar Password (returned in 2022) | CBS | 2008 | Cancelled |
| June 16 | Cupid | ABC | 2009 | Cancelled |
| June 17 | The Unusuals | ABC | 2009 | Cancelled |
| June 19 | Don't Forget the Lyrics! (returned in 2010 and 2022) | Fox | 2007 | Cancelled |
| June 23 | College Hill | BET | 2004 | Cancelled |
| June 25 | Beyond the Break | The N | 2006 | Cancelled |
| June 25 | In the Motherhood | ABC | 2009 | Cancelled |
| June 27 | Groomer Has It | Animal Planet | 2008 | Cancelled |
| June 28 | Three Delivery | Nicktoons | 2008 | Cancelled |
| June 30 | The Best Damn Sports Show Period | Fox Sports Net | 2001 | Cancelled |
| July 8 | Reno 911! (returned in 2020) | Comedy Central | 2003 | Cancelled |
| July 11 | Harper's Island | CBS | 2009 | Cancelled |
| July 11 | Eli Stone | ABC | 2008 | Cancelled |
| July 13 | Here Come the Newlyweds | ABC | 2008 | Cancelled |
| July 13 | Run's House | MTV | 2005 | Cancelled |
| July 18 | Man vs. Cartoon | MTV | 2009 | Cancelled |
| July 18 | DJ & the Fro | MTV | 2009 | Cancelled |
| July 19 | Valentine | The CW | 2008 | Cancelled |
| July 22 | BrainRush | Cartoon Network | 2009 | Cancelled |
| July 23 | Samantha Who? | ABC | 2007 | Cancelled |
| July 25 | Kings | NBC | 2009 | Cancelled |
| July 26 | Hammertime | A&E | 2009 | Cancelled |
| July 26 | Denise Richards: It's Complicated | E! | 2008 | Cancelled |
| July 27 | Charm School | VH1 | 2007 | Cancelled |
| August 5 | I Survived a Japanese Game Show | ABC | 2008 | Cancelled |
| August 6 | Panwapa | PBS Kids Sprout | 2008 | Cancelled |
| August 7 | The Goode Family | ABC | 2009 | Cancelled |
| August 7 | Surviving Suburbia | ABC | 2009 | Cancelled |
| August 8 | Dirty Sexy Money | ABC | 2007 | Cancelled |
| August 8 | Can You Duet | CMT | 2008 | Cancelled |
| August 9 | Z Rock | IFC | 2008 | Cancelled |
| August 12 | The Philanthropist | NBC | 2009 | Cancelled |
| August 14 | Mental | Fox | 2009 | Cancelled |
| August 14 | Random! Cartoons | Nicktoons | 2008 | Cancelled |
| August 16 | Easy Money | The CW | 2008 | Cancelled |
| August 18 | Miami Social | Bravo | 2009 | Cancelled |
| August 19 | Megan Wants a Millionaire | VH1 | 2009 | Cancelled |
| August 26 | Michael & Michael Have Issues | Comedy Central | 2009 | Cancelled |
| September 2 | Wide Angle | PBS | 2002 | Cancelled |
| September 3 | Crime 360 | A&E | 2008 | Cancelled |
| September 4 | Judge David Young | Syndication | 2007 | Cancelled |
| September 5 | The Bill Engvall Show | TBS | 2007 | Cancelled |
| September 5 | VeggieTales on TV! | Qubo | 2006 | Cancelled |
| September 11 | The Assistants | The N | 2009 | Cancelled |
| September 13 | There Goes the Neighborhood | CBS | 2009 | Cancelled |
| September 15 | The Cleaner | A&E | 2008 | Cancelled |
| September 17 | World's Wildest Vacation Videos | truTV | 2008 | Ended |
| September 18 | Are You Smarter Than a 5th Grader? (returned in 2015, 2019 and 2024) | Fox | 2007 | Cancelled |
| September 18 | Guiding Light | CBS | 1952 | Cancelled |
| September 22 | Addicted to Beauty | Oxygen | 2009 | Cancelled |
| September 22 | Ruby & The Rockits | ABC Family | 2009 | Cancelled |
| September 23 | The Beautiful Life | The CW | 2009 | Cancelled |
| September 25 | Money for Breakfast | Fox Business | 2007 | Cancelled |
| October 4 | Raging Planet | Science Channel | 1997 | Cancelled |
| October 10 | Making the Band | MTV | 2000 | Cancelled |
| October 19 | The Mr. Men Show | Cartoon Network | 2008 | Cancelled |
| October 23 | Defying Gravity | ABC | 2009 | Cancelled |
| October 24 | Can You Teach My Alligator Manners? | Playhouse Disney | 2008 | Cancelled |
| October 26 | Real Chance of Love | VH1 | 2008 | Cancelled |
| November 4 | Hank | ABC | 2009 | Cancelled |
| November 8 | Ed, Edd n Eddy | Cartoon Network | 1999 | Ended |
| November 9 | Secret Girlfriend | Comedy Central | 2009 | Cancelled |
| November 11 | Lou Dobbs Tonight (returned in 2011) | CNN | 1980 | Cancelled |
| November 17 | The Prisoner | AMC | 2009 | Cancelled |
| November 18 | The Spectacular Spider-Man | Disney XD | 2008 | Cancelled |
| November 21 | Sit Down, Shut Up | Fox | 2009 | Cancelled |
| November 22 | Dallas Divas & Daughters | Bravo | 2009 | Cancelled |
| November 22 | Titan Maximum | Cartoon Network | 2009 | Cancelled |
| November 29 | Wolverine and the X-Men | Nicktoons | 2009 | Cancelled |
| December 1 | Sherri | Lifetime | 2009 | Cancelled |
| December 4 | Monk (returned in 2023) | USA | 2002 | Ended |
| December 7 | Rita Rocks | Lifetime | 2008 | Cancelled |
| December 7 | Alice | Showcase | 2009 | Cancelled |
| December 8 | Joe Buck Live | HBO | 2009 | Cancelled |
| December 9 | Design Squad | PBS Kids Go! | 2007 | Cancelled |
| December 10 | The Jeff Dunham Show | Comedy Central | 2009 | Cancelled |
| December 10 | Austin Stevens: Snakemaster | Animal Planet | 2004 | Cancelled |
| December 11 | Live at Gotham | Comedy Central | 2006 | Cancelled |
| December 12 | SuperFetch | Animal Planet | 2009 | Cancelled |
| December 17 | It's On with Alexa Chung | MTV | 2009 | Cancelled |
| December 18 | Crash | Starz | 2008 | Cancelled |
| December 22 | Little Einsteins | Playhouse Disney | 2005 | Cancelled |
| December 22 | The Othersiders | Cartoon Network | 2009 | Cancelled |
| December 22 | Table for 12 | TLC | 2009 | Cancelled |
| December 24 | Raising the Bar | TNT | 2008 | Cancelled |
| December 24 | Kamen Rider: Dragon Knight | The CW | 2009 | Cancelled |
| December 26 | Power Rangers RPM | ABC | 2009 | Cancelled |
| December 27 | Brothers | Fox | 2009 | Cancelled |
| December 30 | Eastwick | ABC | 2009 | Cancelled |

=== Made-for-TV movies and miniseries ===
| Premiere date | Title | Channel | Ref. |
|---|---|---|---|
| February 16 | Dadnapped | Disney Channel | |
| February 16 | Spectacular! | Nickelodeon | |
| March 14 | Naked Idol | Nickelodeon | |
| April 11 | The Premiere | Nickelodeon | |
| April 24 | Hatching Pete | Disney Channel | |
| May 1–3 | Wishology | Nickelodeon | |
| June 19 | Mr. Troop Mom | Nickelodeon | |
| June 26 | Princess Protection Program | Disney Channel | |
| July 19 | Deadliest Sea | Discovery Channel | |
| August 28 | Wizards of Waverly Place: The Movie | Disney Channel | |
| September 13 | Scooby-Doo! The Mystery Begins | Cartoon Network | |
| November 8 | Ed, Edd n Eddy's Big Picture Show | Cartoon Network | |
| November 25 | Ben 10: Alien Swarm | Cartoon Network | |

== Networks and services ==
=== Network launches ===
| Network | Type | Launch date | Notes | Source |
|---|---|---|---|---|
| Diya TV | Cable television | Unknown date | | |
| SchlagerTV | Cable television | January | | |
| MLB Network | Pay television | January 1 | Major League Baseball launches MLB Network, becoming the last of the four major American sports leagues to launch its own channel. | |
| The Country Network | Cable television | January 7 | | |
| NBC Nonstop | Cable television | March 9 | NBC's flagship station, WNBC in New York City, launches New York Nonstop, an entertainment/lifestyle channel. | |
| YNN Buffalo | Local cable | March 25 | Regional news channel for western New York state; currently known as Spectrum News Buffalo. | |
| Live Well Network | Over-the-air multicast | April 27 | Lifestyle programming channel launched for the ABC Owned Television Stations. | |
| Tuff TV | Over-the-air multicast | June 30 | Sports and outdoor lifestyle programming channel launched by Luken Communications. | |
| Wedding Central | Cable television | August 18 | Rainbow Media launched the new channel on its parent Cablevision's systems. | |
| NFL RedZone | National cable/satellite television channel | September 13 | The gamy-day exclusive NFL Redzone provides whip-around coverage of all Sunday afternoon regular-season games that are aired in progress on CBS or Fox. It broadcasts every Sunday during the National Football League regular season from 12:55 to 8 p.m. Eastern time (10:55 a.m. to 5 p.m. Pacific Time). | |
| Estrella TV | Spanish-language over-the-air multicast | September 14 | | |
| VasalloVision | Cable television | October 22 | | |
| Halogen TV | Cable television | October 24 | | |
| Epix | Pay television | October 30 | Epix, a new premium channel, launches, with Verizon FiOS being its first carrier. | |
| Wazoo Sports Network | Regional over-the-air multicast network | Unknown date | Local sports network airing local high school, college, and minor league sporting events in the Louisville and Lexington, Kentucky markets. | |
| Epix 3 | Pay television | Unknown date | | |

=== Conversions and rebrandings ===
| Old network name | New network name | Type | Conversion date | Notes | Source |
|---|---|---|---|---|---|
| Toon Disney | Disney XD | Pay television | February 13 | | |
| Sci Fi | Syfy | Pay television | July 7 | Warehouse 13 premiered on the same day the channel relaunched itself. | |
| BET J | Centric | Pay television | September 28 | | |
| Noggin | Nick Jr. | Pay television | September 28 | | |
| The N | TeenNick | Pay television | September 28 | | |
| CaribeVision | America CV Network | Cable television | Unknown | | |

=== Network closures ===
| Network | Type | Launch date | Closure date | Notes | Source |
|---|---|---|---|---|---|
| KET ED | Regional over-the-air multicasting and cable | 2007 | Fall 2009 | A public television service provided by the Kentucky Educational Television network, the channel provided instructional television and professional development programming to schools and libraries, fulfilling the duty of its predecessors KET3, KET4, and Star Channels 703 and 704. KET ED was discontinued as a linear channel, but some of its programming was shown on the Kentucky Channel for the next three years until its programming was made exclusively available through KET's On-Demand Video Service. | |
| Pennsylvania Public Television Network | Regional over-the-air and cable | Unknown | Fall 2009 | | |
| Variety Television Network | OTA multicasting and cable | Unknown | January 2009 | | |
| Nickelodeon Games and Sports for Kids | Cable television | March 1, 1999 | April 23, 2009 | Nick GAS shuts down on Dish Network and is replaced by a Pacific time zone feed of Cartoon Network. | |
| TuVision | Cable television | July 1, 2007 | 2009 | | |
| White Springs Television | OTA broadcasting and cable | January 2007 | October 2009 | | |

== Television stations ==
=== Station launches ===
| Date | City of License/Market | Station | Channel | Affiliation | Notes/Ref. |
|---|---|---|---|---|---|
| January 1 | Beaumont, Texas | KBMT-DT2 | 12.2 | NBC | |
| January 1 | Elmira, New York | WENY-DT2 | 36.2 | CBS | |
| January 5 | Meridian, Mississippi | WGBC-DT2 | 30.2 | NBC | NBC relocated from the station's main channel |
| February 18 | Mobile, Alabama/Pensacola, Florida | WDPM-DT | 4 (now on 18) | Daystar | |
| March 2 | Pueblo/Colorado Springs, Colorado | KVSN-TV | 48 | Univision | |
| June | Glendive, Montana | KXGN-DT2 | 5.2 | NBC | |
| July | Jackson, Mississippi | WWJX | 23 | AMGTV | |
| July | Lima, Ohio | WOHL-CA | 25 / 35.1 | ABC | |
| July 13 | Great Falls, Montana | KTMF-DT2 | 23.2 | Fox (primary); MyNetworkTV (secondary); Jewelry Television (overnights) | |
| August 1 | Springfield, Missouri | KRBK | 49 | MyNetworkTV | |
| August 20 | Derby/Wichita, Kansas | KDCU-TV | 31 | Univision | |
| September 28 | Lima, Ohio | WOHL-CD2 | 35.2 | CBS | |
| October | Oklahoma City, Oklahoma | KWTV-DT2 | 9.2 | News Now 53 | |
| November 30 | Duluth, Minnesota | KCWV | 27 | My Family TV | |
| Unknown date | Billings, Montana | KBGS-TV | 16 | PBS | Part of the Montana PBS network |

=== Network affiliation changes ===
| Date | City of License/Market | Station | Channel | Old affiliation | New affiliation | Notes/Ref. |
|---|---|---|---|---|---|---|
| January 1 | Beaumont, Texas | KBTV-TV | 4 / 4.1 | NBC | Fox | |
| January 1 | Beaumont, Texas | KUIL-LP | 64 | Fox | Independent | |
| January 5 | Meridian, Mississippi | WGBC | 30.1 | NBC | Fox | NBC moves to WGBC-DT2 |
| January 5 | Meridian, Mississippi | WTOK-DT2 | 11.2 | Fox (primary); The Sportsman Channel (secondary) | MyNetworkTV (primary); Jewelry Television (secondary) | |
| June | Glendive, Montana | KXGN-TV | 5 / 5.1 | CBS (primary); NBC and The Sportsman Channel (secondary) | CBS (exclusive) | KXGN launched a DT2 subchannel that now serves as a full-time NBC affiliate. |
| June 12 | Lincoln, Nebraska | KFXL-TV (recalled from KCWL-TV) | 51.1 | The CW Plus | Fox | |
| June 15 | Wilmington, North Carolina | WWAY-DT2 | 3.2 | Independent (local weather) | RTV | |
| July | Marquette, Michigan | WLUC-DT2 | 6.2 | Universal Sports | Fox (primary); America One (secondary) | |
| July 1 | Boise, Idaho | KYUU-LP | 35 / 35.1 | CBS (as a KBOI repeater) | RTV | |
| July 13 | Charlotte Amalie, U.S. Virgin Islands | W52DG | 52 | Religious independent | CBS | |
| Unknown date | Williamson, West Virginia | W45AZ | 45 | TBN | RTV | |

=== Station closures ===
| Date | City of license/Market | Station | Channel | Affiliation | Sign-on date | Notes |
|---|---|---|---|---|---|---|
| March 4 | Lexington, Kentucky | WBLU-LP | 62 | Retro Television Network; Retro Jams | May 3, 1999 | |
| March 20 | Bethel, Alaska | KYUK-TV | 4 | PBS; Alaska One | 1972 | |
| June 12 | Christiansted, U.S. Virgin Islands | WVIF | 15 | Independent | 2000 | |
| June 12 | Sun Valley/Twin Falls, Idaho | KIDK | 5 | Independent | 2003 | |
| September 1 | Nacogdoches, Texas | KETK-LP | 53 (analog) | NBC | 2004 | |
| October 1 | Mercer, Pennsylvania | WFXI-CA | 17 | Fox | 1990 | |

== Births ==
| Date | Name | Notability |
|---|---|---|
| January 26 | YaYa Gosselin | Actress |
| January 29 | Winslow Fegley | Actor |
| March 4 | Dylan Gilmer | Actor |
| April 15 | Julia Butters | Actress |
| May 18 | Hala Finley | Actress |
| September 25 | Leah Jeffries | Actress |

== Deaths ==
=== January ===
| Date | Name | Age | Notability |
|---|---|---|---|
| January 3 | Pat Hingle | 84 | Actor |
| January 6 | Cheryl Holdridge | 64 | Actress (The Mickey Mouse Club) |
| January 8 | Don Galloway | 71 | Actor (Sgt. Ed Brown on Ironside) |
| January 9 | Hager Twins | 67 | Actor/singer (Hee Haw) |
| January 13 | Patrick McGoohan | 80 | Actor (John Drake on Danger Man and Number 6 on The Prisoner) |
| January 14 | Ricardo Montalbán | 88 | Actor (Fantasy Island, Freakazoid!, Kim Possible) |
| January 18 | Bob May | 69 | Actor and stuntman (Lost in Space) |
| January 21 | Veatrice Rice | 59 | television personality (Jimmy Kimmel Live!) |
| January 25 | Kim Manners | 58 | Television producer-director (The X-Files, Supernatural) |
| January 31 | Clint Ritchie | 70 | Actor (One Life to Live) |

=== February ===
| Date | Name | Age | Notability |
|---|---|---|---|
| February 6 | James Whitmore | 87 | Actor and commercial spokesman (The Practice) |
| February 6 | Philip Carey | 83 | Actor and commercial spokesman (Laredo, One Life to Live) |
| February 7 | Molly Bee | 69 | Actress and singer (Hometown Jamboree) |
| February 28 | Paul Harvey | 90 | Radio and television news commentator (The Rest of the Story, Good Morning America) |

=== March ===
| Date | Name | Age | Notability |
|---|---|---|---|
| March 13 | Alan W. Livingston | 91 | Vice-president in charge of programming at NBC; created the character of Bozo the Clown |
| March 13 | Andrew Martin | 33 | Professional wrestler known as Test in the WWF/E & The Punisher in TNA |
| March 15 | Ron Silver | 62 | Actor, director, producer (The West Wing) |
| March 17 | Morton Lachman | 90 | Television writer and producer (All in the Family, Gimme a Break!, Kate & Allie) |
| March 24 | George Kell | 86 | Sportscaster (Detroit Tigers play-by-play announcer [1959–96]) |
| March 27 | Irving R. Levine | 86 | Journalist-correspondent for NBC News |
| March 28 | Maurice Jarre | 84 | Composer (Cimarron Strip, Jesus of Nazareth, Shōgun, The Murder of Mary Phagan) |
| March 29 | Andy Hallett | 33 | Actor (Angel, Angel: Live Fast, Die Never) |

=== April ===
| Date | Name | Age | Notability |
|---|---|---|---|
| April 3 | Thomas Braden | 92 | Television journalist and commentator (Crossfire), whose book Eight Is Enough was adapted into the series of the same name |
| April 8 | Dan Miller | 67 | Television journalist (anchorman at WSMV/Nashville, Tennessee and KCBS-TV/Los Angeles, California; The Pat Sajak Show sidekick) |
| April 13 | Harry Kalas | 73 | Philadelphia Phillies radio-television play-by-play announcer since 1971, narrator of NFL Films and NFL on Westwood One play-by-play |
| April 15 | Merle Harmon | 82 | Television-radio sportscaster, commercial spokesman, and businessman (play-by-play announcer for Milwaukee Brewers and Texas Rangers; ABC and NBC Sports programs) |
| April 25 | Bea Arthur | 86 | Actress (Maude on All in the Family and Maude, Dorothy on The Golden Girls) |

=== May ===
| Date | Name | Age | Notability |
|---|---|---|---|
| May 1 | Danny Gans | 52 | Comedian and musical impressionist (portrayed Dean Martin in 1992 miniseries Sinatra) |
| May 2 | Jack Kemp | 73 | Football player and politician |
| May 4 | Dom DeLuise | 75 | Actor/comedian |
| May 13 | Frank Aletter | 83 | Actor (Bringing Up Buddy, The Cara Williams Show, Nancy) |
| May 18 | Dolla | 21 | Rapper |
| May 18 | Wayne Allwine | 62 | Voice actor (Mickey Mouse) |
| May 21 | Joan Alexander | 94 | Actress and game show panelist (The Name's the Same, The New Adventures of Superman) |
| May 26 | Michael Ross | 89 | Comedy writer/producer (All in the Family, The Jeffersons, Three's Company) |

=== June ===
| Date | Name | Age | Notability |
|---|---|---|---|
| June 3 | David Carradine | 72 | Actor (Kung Fu and Kung Fu: The Legend Continues) |
| June 8 | Johnny Palermo | 27 | Actor (Everybody Hates Chris) |
| June 19 | Ken Roberts | 99 | Voice-over announcer and actor (The Secret Storm, The Electric Company) |
| June 23 | Ed McMahon | 86 | The Tonight Show Starring Johnny Carson sidekick, Star Search host |
| June 25 | Farrah Fawcett | 62 | Actress (Charlie's Angels) |
| June 25 | Michael Jackson | 50 | Entertainer and recording artist (also The Jackson 5) |
| June 27 | Gale Storm | 87 | Actress and singer (My Little Margie, The Gale Storm Show) |
| June 28 | Billy Mays | 50 | Commercial/infomercial pitchman (OxiClean, Orange Glo, ESPN360.com, etc.) |
| June 28 | Fred Travalena | 66 | Impressionist, comedian, actor and game show host (Anything For Money) |

=== July ===
| Date | Name | Age | Notability |
|---|---|---|---|
| July 1 | Karl Malden | 97 | Actor (The Streets of San Francisco, The West Wing) |
| July 11 | Mark Mandala | 72 | Television executive (President of ABC from 1986 to 1994) |
| July 17 | Walter Cronkite | 92 | Television/radio journalist, reporter, author and narrator (CBS Evening News anchor [1962–81]) and Liberty's Kids |
| July 21 | Gidget | 15 | Advertiser for Taco Bell |

=== August ===
| Date | Name | Age | Notability |
|---|---|---|---|
| August 6 | John Hughes | 59 | Writer for (At Ease) |
| August 16 | Ed Reimers | 96 | Television/radio voiceover announcer and actor (voice behind Allstate Insurance's "You're In Good Hands" commercials; Maverick, Star Trek) |
| August 18 | Robert Novak | 78 | Journalist, writer and commentator (Crossfire) |
| August 19 | Don Hewitt | 86 | Producer, creator of 60 Minutes |
| August 26 | Dominick Dunne | 83 | Screenwriter, producer, news contributor/commentator (Adventures in Paradise, The Two Mrs. Grenvilles), more recently host of Dominick Dunne's Power, Privilege, and Justice |
| August 28 | Adam Goldstein | 36 | Reality television participant (Punk'd, The Simple Life) |

=== September ===
| Date | Name | Age | Notability |
|---|---|---|---|
| September 4 | Buddy Blattner | 89 | Sportscaster (most recently for the Atlanta Hawks) |
| September 8 | Army Archerd | 87 | Variety columnist and television personality (Entertainment Tonight, The Movie Show) |
| September 10 | Frank Batten | 82 | Co-founder of The Weather Channel |
| September 11 | Larry Gelbart | 81 | Producer, director and writer (creator of M*A*S*H and others) |
| September 12 | George Eckstein | 81 | Television writer and producer (The Fugitive, Gunsmoke) |
| September 13 | Arnold Laven | 87 | Producer (creator of The Rifleman) |
| September 14 | Henry Gibson | 73 | Actor (Rowan and Martin's Laugh-In, Rocket Power) |
| September 14 | Patrick Swayze | 57 | Actor (The Beast, North and South) |
| September 15 | Fred Cusick | 90 | Sportscaster (Boston Bruins play-by-play announcer for 45 seasons) |
| September 16 | Mary Travers | 72 | Singer, songwriter; member of Peter, Paul and Mary (The Jack Benny Program, What's My Line and Peter Paul & Mary television concert specials) |
| September 21 | Robert Ginty | 60 | Actor (The Paper Chase, Falcon Crest, Hawaiian Heat) and director |

=== October ===
| Date | Name | Age | Notability |
|---|---|---|---|
| October 14 | Lou Albano | 76 | Wrestler and actor (Mario on The Super Mario Bros. Super Show!) |
| October 17 | Jay W. Johnson | 66 | Congressman (Wisconsin's 8th congressional district) and television news anchor/reporter (Alumni of WFRV and WLUK/Green Bay, Wisconsin) |
| October 17 | Vic Mizzy | 93 | Songwriter (The Addams Family and Green Acres theme songs) |
| October 22 | Soupy Sales | 83 | Children's television personality, actor, and comedian (Lunch with Soupy Sales, What's My Line, Junior Almost Anything Goes) |

=== November ===
| Date | Name | Age | Notability |
|---|---|---|---|
| November 3 | Carl Ballantine | 92 | Actor (McHale's Navy, Night Court, Garfield and Friends), comedian, and magician |
| November 10 | David Lloyd | 75 | Screenwriter (The Mary Tyler Moore Show, The Bob Newhart Show, Cheers, Frasier) |
| November 15 | Dennis Cole | 69 | Actor (Felony Squad; Bracken's World; The Young and the Restless) |
| November 15 | Ken Ober | 52 | Actor, host (Remote Control), and producer (The New Adventures of Old Christine) |
| November 27 | Bill Bresnan | 75 | Cable television pioneer (founder of Bresnan Communications) |

=== December ===
| Date | Name | Age | Notability |
|---|---|---|---|
| December 2 | Aaron Schroeder | 83 | Songwriter (Scooby Doo, Where Are You! theme song) |
| December 4 | Eddie Fatu | 36 | Samoan-American professional wrestler known as Umaga in the WWE |
| December 7 | Mark Ritts | 63 | Actor (Beakman's World) |
| December 9 | Gene Barry | 90 | Actor (Bat Masterson, Burke's Law, The Name of the Game, and L.A. 2017) |
| December 14 | Conard Fowkes | 76 | Actor (Dark Shadows, As the World Turns,The Secret Storm,The Edge of Night) |
| December 15 | Oral Roberts | 91 | Televangelist and educator |
| December 16 | Roy E. Disney | 79 | Television station group owner/shareholder (Shamrock Holdings) and senior executive of The Walt Disney Company; nephew of Walt Disney |
| December 17 | Alaina Reed Hall | 63 | Actress and singer (Sesame Street, 227) |
| December 18 | Connie Hines | 78 | Actress (Mister Ed, Love, American Style) |
| December 20 | Arnold Stang | 91 | Actor/voice actor (Texaco Star Theater, Top Cat) |
| December 20 | Brittany Murphy | 32 | Actress (Drexell's Class, King of the Hill) |
| December 22 | Michael Currie | 81 | Actor (Dark Shadows) |
| December 24 | George Michael | 70 | Sportscaster (The George Michael Sports Machine) |
| December 26 | Percy Sutton | 89 | Owner of The Apollo Theater, the setting for Showtime at the Apollo |
| December 29 | Dave Diles | 78 | Sportscaster, journalist and analyst (ABC's Wide World of Sports, The Prudential College Football Scoreboard Show) |
| December 30 | Erik Gates | 47 | Television personality and science contributor (MythBusters) |

== See also ==
- 2009 in the United States
- List of American films of 2009
