= FYI (Canadian TV channel) =

Defunct Canadian television channel

- Country: Canada
- Broadcast area: Nationwide
- Headquarters: Toronto, Ontario

Programming
- Language: English
- Picture format: 1080i (HDTV) (2016–2019); 480i (SDTV) (2001–2019)

Ownership
- Owner: Alliance Atlantis (2001–2008); Canwest (2008–2010); Shaw Media (2010–2016); Corus Entertainment (2016–2019) (Discovery Health Channel Canada ULC)
- Sister channels: History; Crime & Investigation; History2; Lifetime; OWN; W Network; Slice; ABC Spark; Adult Swim; CMT; HGTV; Food Network

History
- Launched: 7 September 2001; 24 years ago
- Closed: 31 December 2019; 6 years ago
- Former names: Discovery Health Channel (2001–2007); Discovery Health (2007–2010); Twist TV (2010–2014)

FYI (stylized as fyi,) was a Canadian English language specialty channel owned by Discovery Health Canada, ULC, a subsidiary of Corus Entertainment. Based on the American cable network of the same name, the channel featured lifestyle programming, with a mix of reality, culinary, home renovation and makeover series.

The channel was launched on September 7, 2001, as Discovery Health Channel by a joint venture of Alliance Atlantis and Discovery Communications, which focused on health and wellness-oriented programming. Discovery Health was acquired by Canwest in 2008 which rebranded the network as Twist TV in 2010 before being taken over by Shaw Media. As Twist TV, the channel shifted to reality programming aimed at a female demographic.

After being rebranded to FYI in 2014 and acquired by Corus in 2016, the channel ended its operations on December 31, 2019.

== History ==
=== As Discovery Health ===
Logo as Discovery Health used from 2001 to 2007

In January 2000, Alliance Atlantis brokered a deal with Rupert Murdoch's News Corporation and several Canadian television providers, including both national satellite companies Bell ExpressVu and Star Choice, to distribute News Corporation's cable channel, The Health Network, in Canada. The deal would mark the first time The Health Network would be available in Canada.

The deal struck to sponsor The Health Network's distribution in Canada was a prelude to the fact that Alliance Atlantis and News Corporation would eventually launch a Canadian version of the channel for the domestic market and remove the American channel from the Canadian market. On November 24, 2000, Alliance Atlantis (which would hold 80% majority interest in the channel) and News Corporation (which would hold the remaining 20% interest) were granted a broadcasting licence for The Health Network Canada by the Canadian Radio-television and Telecommunications Commission (CRTC).

Prior to the launch of the network, in September 2001, Discovery Communications (owners of Discovery Health Channel in the U.S.) bought The Health Network from News Corporation for US$255 million. Through that transaction, Discovery Communications would also acquire News Corporation's 20% interest in The Health Network Canada.

Logo as Discovery Health used from 2007 to 2010

As a result of Discovery Communications' newly acquired interest in the service, the network was launched that same month on September 7, 2001, as the Discovery Health Channel. On the same day as the Canadian channel's launch, the American service, The Health Network, was removed from all Canadian television providers. In February 2002, The Health Network was removed from the CRTC's list of foreign satellite services eligible for carriage on Canadian pay television providers, by request of The Health Network's owners.

On January 18, 2008, a joint venture between Canwest and Goldman Sachs Alternatives, known as CW Media, bought Alliance Atlantis and through that transaction, acquired Alliance Atlantis' interest in Discovery Health. In 2009, CW Media purchased the remaining interest in the channel from Discovery Communications, bringing its ownership to 100%.

=== As Twist TV ===
Logo as Twist TV used from 2010 to 2014

Two deals were announced in late 2009 and early 2010 that affected the future of the Canadian channel. First, Discovery Communications announced that the flagship Discovery Health channel in the U.S. would be replaced by the Oprah Winfrey Network (OWN) in January 2011. OWN later reached an agreement with Corus Entertainment to launch a Canadian version of that channel shortly after the U.S. version's debut. Later in April 2010, Discovery Communications announced an expanded long-term agreement with Bell Media (then CTVglobemedia, Discovery's Canadian partner for most of its other channels) under which Bell holds Canadian broadcast rights to most of the Discovery Communications programming library, including Discovery Health programs, and the right to launch new Discovery-branded channels.

On September 15, 2010, Canwest announced Discovery Health Canada would rebrand as Twist TV on November 1. The rebranded channel would focus on reality shows about "people facing extraordinary situations" aimed at a female demographic including such shows as Nanny 911, Raising Sextuplets, Dad Camp, and Little Miss Perfect. The name came from the narrative "twist" trope common with reality and non-fiction programming. On October 27, 2010, the channel's ownership changed again as Shaw Communications gained control of Discovery Health as a result of its acquisition of Canwest and Goldman Sachs' interest in CW Media. The channel officially rebranded five days later. The network was wholly unrelated to the American Twist network with the same format launched in 2021.

=== Rebrand as FYI ===
In June 2014, it was reported that Twist TV, along with sister network Mystery TV, would be rebranded as Canadian versions of FYI and the Crime & Investigation Network under a licensing agreement with A+E Networks. A+E Networks and Shaw Media had previously partnered to rebrand History Television, Showcase Diva and The Cave as Canadian versions of History, Lifetime and H2 in 2012.

The launch of FYI (as well as CI) was intended to draw in more female viewers, the primary audience of Shaw Media's lifestyle networks. In addition to programming from the U.S. service, as well as other Shaw Media-owned channels, the new channel will air shows from other sources. The channel was relaunched on the morning of September 1, 2014 with a free preview to last the rest of the month. A month prior, a Canadian version of the FYI website went online. Over time, the website was updated to include information pertaining to the channel.

A YouTube channel went online August 28, 2014; on that day, sneak peeks of FYI programming aired on Lifetime and Slice. On April 1, 2016, Shaw Media was sold to Corus Entertainment.

=== Closure ===
In June 2019, at the Corus Entertainment upfronts, Corus Entertainment announced its Fall 2019 schedules of its top-performing specialty channels. However, FYI was not included in the upfronts.

In October 2019, Corus announced that FYI would be shut down at midnight on December 31, 2019, after which the channel space created in 2001 by Discovery Health Channel ceased to exist. The channel's license was surrendered to the CRTC on February 4, 2020.

Some of its programming such as Storage Wars, which aired on this channel, are also available on Disney+ which is accessible in Canada.

== FYI HD ==
In late 2016, Corus launched FYI HD, a 1080i high definition simulcast of the standard definition feed. The HD feed was available on Bell Fibe TV, Bell MTS and Optik TV. On August 8, 2018, it launched on Shaw Direct. The HD feed shut down on December 31, 2019.

== See also ==
- Discovery Life (US)
- Discovery Home & Health (UK)
