= Sherri Papini: Caught in the Lie =

2025 American TV documentary series

- Directed by: Nicole Rittenmeyer
- Country of origin: United States
- Original language: English
- No. of episodes: 4

Production
- Executive producers: Steven Michaels; Jodi Flynn; Bryan O’Connell; Ariel Brozell; Jamie Bovshow; Pamela Deutsch
- Producers: Leah Harari; Chris Karnak; Amanda Perse; Meredith Russell
- Cinematography: Denis Zannatta
- Editors: Dan Shulman-Means; Cody Rogowski; Mike Armes
- Running time: 42-43 minutes
- Production companies: Pantheon Media Group; Lady Moon Entertainment

Original release
- Network: Investigation Discovery
- Release: May 26 – May 27, 2025

Sherri Papini: Caught in the Lie is an American documentary series directed by Nicole Rittenmeyer. It explores the Sherri Papini kidnapping hoax, from the perspective of Papini.

It premiered on May 26, 2025, on Investigation Discovery.

== Premise ==
Explores the Sherri Papini kidnapping hoax, from the perspective of Papini, who gives her first interview. Papini additionally reenacts her disappearance and takes a polygraph test. Interviews include Papini's parents, former sister-in-law and sister.

== Episodes ==
No.	Title	Directed by	Original release date	U.S. viewers (millions)
1	"Exodus"	Nicole Rittenmeyer	May 26, 2025	0.484
2	"I'm A Liar"	Nicole Rittenmeyer	May 26, 2025	0.484
3	"Multiple Truths"	Nicole Rittenmeyer	May 27, 2025	0.325
4	"It's Complicated"	Nicole Rittenmeyer	May 27, 2025	0.325

== Production ==
In July 2024, it was announced Investigation Discovery had ordered a documentary series revolving around the Sherri Papini kidnapping hoax, with Papini set to give her first interview.
