= Pantheon Media Group =

American television production company

Pantheon Media Group LLC
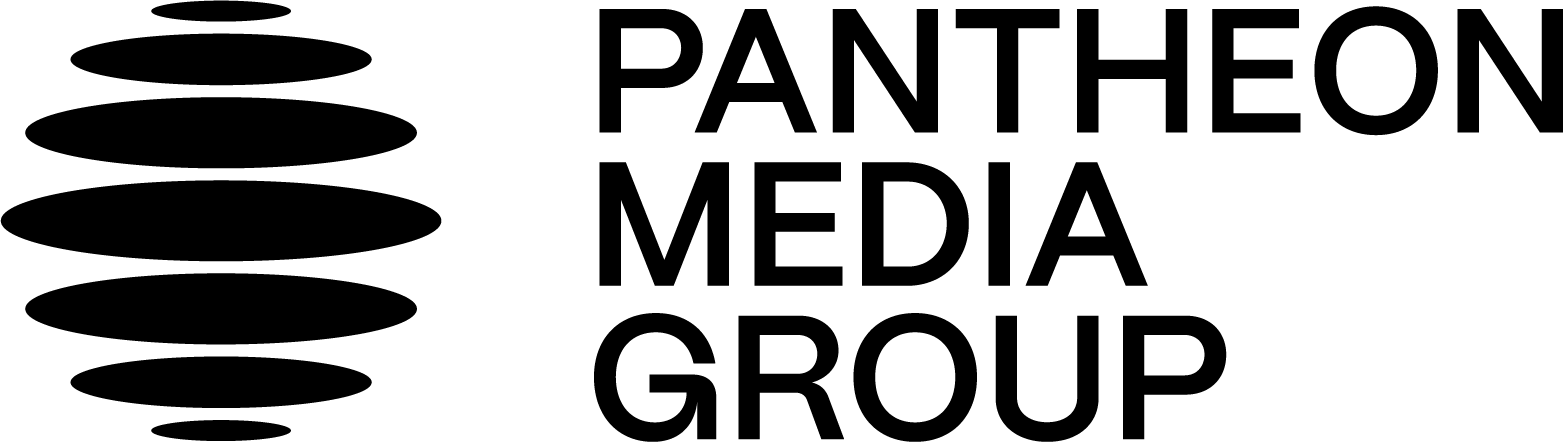
- Company type: Subsidiary
- Industry: Film; Television
- Founder: Steve Michaels
- Key people: Steve Michaels (Chairman); Jennifer O'Connell (CEO)
- Products: Feature films; Television shows
- Parent: Legendary Entertainment (2013–2018); Endeavor (2023–present)
- Subsidiaries: 45Live; Asylum Entertainment; Audity; Big City; Breaklight Pictures; DARE Pictures; Done and Dusted; Film45; Ladywell Films (minority stake); Large Eyes; Moon&Back Media; Pantheon Studios; Pantheon Studios International; Soho Studios Entertainment; Texas Crew Productions; Tyler Perry Studios Unscripted
- Website: www.pantheonmedia.com

Pantheon Media Group LLC (formerly known as Asylum Entertainment Group LLC) is a production company that has produced Emmy and Peabody award winning productions. The company operates several labels around the globe and specializes in unscripted television, film, and content production.

== History ==
Founded as Asylum Entertainment in 2003 by Steve Michaels, Legendary Entertainment purchased the company for $100 million in 2013.

In 2018, Michaels bought the company back and re-launched it as The Content Group.

In 2019, Michaels restored the Asylum Entertainment brand forming new parent company, Asylum Entertainment Group LLC. That year, the company partnered with veteran executive producer Lori Rothschild Ansaldi to launch Big City TV and also launched audio division Audity.

In 2020, Asylum Entertainment Group acquired Dance Moms' producer Collins Avenue Entertainment from Kew Media and launched Breaklight Pictures with veteran producer Dan Johnstone.

In 2022, they acquired Texas Crew Productions.

In 2023, the company bought a stake in the UK producer Moon&Back Media and secured first-look production deals with The New York Post and Comandante Productions, led by Rage Against the Machine's Tom Morello.

In 2023, Endeavor purchased a majority stake in the company.

In early 2024, the company announced a series of new partnerships and acquisitions including a partnership with director Scott Weintrob's Large Eyes Entertainment an investment in UK-based production company Soho Studios Entertainment, an acquired stake in British production company, DARE Entertainment, a minority stake in independent production house Ladywell Films—founded by The Tinder Swindler filmmakers Bernadette Higgins and Felicity Morris— as well as a joint venture with Tyler Perry Studios.

At the end of July 2024, Asylum Entertainment Group announced that they also acquired a significant stake in British-American live and unscripted production company Done and Dusted.

In addition, in December 2024, Asylum Entertainment Group announced that they had rebranded as Pantheon Media Group, hiring veteran unscripted executive producer Jennifer O’Connell as their new CEO with founder Steven Michaels becoming chairman of the rebranded company.

== Filmography ==
=== TV series ===
Year	Series	Distributor
2025	Ruby & Jodi: A Cult of Sin and Influence	Investigation Discovery
2025	Sherri Papini: Caught in the Lie	Investigation Discovery
2024	Zillow Gone Wild	HGTV
2018–2021	Eli Roth's History of Horror	AMC
2018	In Ice Cold Blood	Oxygen
2018	To Rome for Love	Bravo
2017	I Am Elizabeth Smart	Lifetime
2017	Origins: The Journey of Humankind	NatGeo
2015	The Secret Life of Marilyn Monroe	Lifetime
2014–2015	Hollywood Hillbillies	Reelz
2013–2014	Hollywood Scandals	Reelz
2013	Owner's Manual	AMC
2013	Urban Tarzan	Spike
2012	RV Kings	Travel Channel
2012	Travel Unraveled	Travel Channel
2012–2014	10 Things You Don't Know About	History Channel
2011	Two of a Kind	Self-distributed
2011	The Kennedys	Warner Bros. Television Distribution
2008–2009	World's Wildest Vacation Videos	TruTV
2008–2011	The Locator	We TV
2006–2008	American Gangster	BET
2001–2006	Beyond the Glory	Fox Sports

=== Films ===
Year	Film	Director
2025	New York Post Presents: Luigi Mangione Monster or Martyr?	New York Post
2017	Cocaine Godmother	Guillermo Navarro
2017	I Am Elizabeth Smart	Sarah Walker
2017	Britney Ever After	Leslie Libman
2015	Manson's Lost Girls	Susanna Lo
2013	Ring of Fire	Allison Anders

=== Shorts ===
Year	Film	Director
2018	Far Cry 5: Inside Eden’s Gate	Barry Battles
