= Sherri Papini kidnapping hoax =

2016 kidnapping hoax

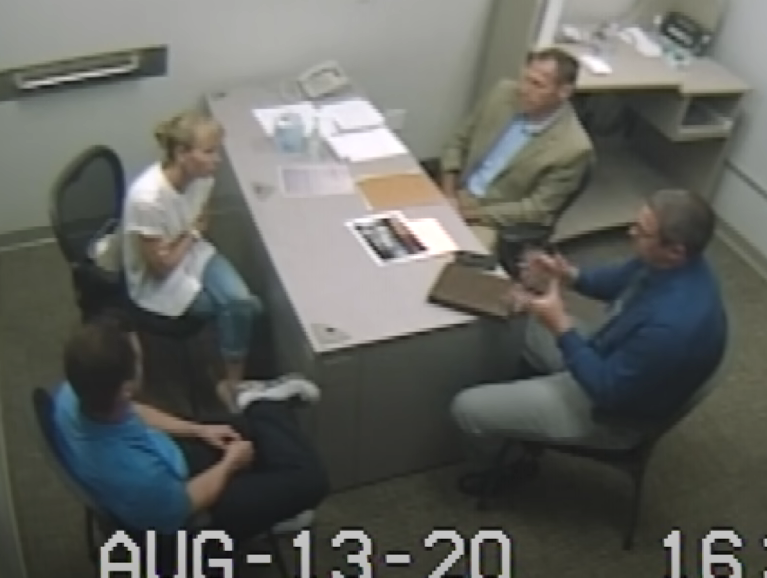
Sherri Papini (top left) with her husband (bottom left) sitting for a police interrogation

Sherri Louise Graeff-Papini is an American woman who disappeared on November 2, 2016, reportedly while out jogging a mile from her home in Redding, California. Papini was 34 years old at the time. She reappeared three weeks later on Thanksgiving Day, November 24, having been reportedly freed by her captors at 4:30 that morning, still wearing restraints, on the side of County Road 17 near Interstate 5 in Yolo County, about 150 miles (240 km) south of where she disappeared.

The case garnered significant media attention; law enforcement experts cited doubts as to her story because of the unlikely details and inconsistencies of the reported abduction. In August 2020, she stood by her story when a federal agent and a detective from the Shasta County Sheriff's Office questioned her. She received more than $30,000 from the California Victim Compensation Board between 2017 and 2021. On March 3, 2022, Papini was arrested on federal charges arising from her fabrication of the abduction; she had reportedly been staying with a former boyfriend, James Reyes, during the time she was supposedly missing and, according to Reyes, allegedly asked that he harm her in order to give credence to her lies.

Six weeks after her arrest, Papini signed a plea deal admitting that she had orchestrated the hoax. She pleaded guilty to one count of mail fraud and one count of making false statements. In September 2022, she was sentenced to 18 months in prison followed by three years of supervised release, and ordered to pay $300,000 (including restitution to cover the costs of the police investigation).

== Background ==
Sherri Louise Graeff was born on June 11, 1982, and grew up in Mount Shasta, California. She married Keith Papini in October 2009. The couple have two children together, one son and one daughter. On March 3, 2022, the day on which Sherri was arrested on federal charges, the couple separated. In April 2022, a few days after Sherri pleaded guilty to fraud charges, Keith filed for divorce from his wife and for sole custody of their children.

== Disappearance and claims ==
On November 2, 2016, Sherri's husband Keith Papini returned from work to find her not at home. He eventually found her cell phone and earbuds at an intersection about a mile away.

According to Shasta County Sheriff Tom Bosenko, in interviews Papini said she was held by two Hispanic women who took steps to keep their faces hidden from her, either by wearing masks or by keeping Papini's head covered. Papini was branded on her right shoulder during her purported captivity with the word EXODUS. When investigators questioned Sherri at a later date, she claimed that it looked like a verse from the Book of Exodus. According to a statement by her husband, Sherri was physically abused during her captivity, had her nose broken and her hair cut off, and weighed 87 pounds (39 kg) when she was released.

At that time, the sheriff said it was still an active investigation and authorities were "looking for a dark-colored SUV with two Hispanic females armed with a handgun." Detectives had authored close to 20 search warrants, including some in Michigan, and said they were examining cellphone records, bank accounts, email, and social media profiles. The FBI provided assistance in the case.

Papini was found with both male and female DNA on her, which matched neither her nor her husband. The FBI ran the samples through the Combined DNA Index System (CODIS) and found no matches. In March 2022, it was reported that DNA found on her clothing matched that of an ex-boyfriend, James Reyes, who confirmed that Papini stayed with him at his residence in Southern California during the time she was allegedly kidnapped.

== Prosecution, guilty plea, and sentence ==
On March 3, 2022, Sherri Papini was arrested by the FBI, accused of lying to federal agents and faking her kidnapping to spend time with her ex-boyfriend, away from her husband and family. In April 2022, six weeks after her arrest, Papini pleaded guilty in the U.S. District Court in Sacramento to one count of making false statements and one count of mail fraud as part of a plea agreement; she admitted to orchestrating the hoax. Thirty-three other counts of mail fraud were dropped as part of the plea agreement. Her husband filed for divorce after her guilty plea.

In the September 2022 sentencing hearing, she apologized and accepted full responsibility. In sentencing submissions, her attorney cited past mental health issues as contributors to her actions. She was sentenced to 18 months in prison and ordered to pay $309,902, including restitution to cover the multi-state police investigation that the hoax prompted. Papini was released from prison in August 2023 and placed in a halfway house.

== Media coverage and in popular culture ==
At the time of her purported kidnapping, Papini's disappearance was featured extensively in national news, and true crime programs, including a front cover People profile. The same outlets have continued to cover the story after the hoax was confirmed, including multiple true crime documentaries, newsmagazine episodes and podcasts. During a 2025 exclusive interview with Inside Edition, Papini admitted difficulty in finding a job due to worldwide attention the case has received.

The first scripted film based on the hoax was the 2023 Lifetime television film Hoax: The Kidnapping of Sherri Papini with Jaime King playing the title role. The lead detective was depicted as female and played by Lossen Chambers, while in real life the lead detective was Shasta County Sheriff Sergeant Kyle Wallace.

Hulu's limited documentary series Perfect Wife: The Mysterious Disappearance of Sherri Papini was released on June 19, 2024.

Eminem references the kidnapping hoax in his song "Houdini" with the line "...Caught sleepin' and see the kidnappin' never did happen (no), Like Sherri Papini, Harry Houdini, I vanish into the thin air as I'm leaving like..."

== Documentary and injury evidence ==
Sherri Papini: Caught in the Lie, a limited documentary series from Investigation Discovery, premiered on May 26, 2025, and featured Papini's first public interview since her conviction. The series explores previously undisclosed aspects of her personal life, including her marriage to Keith Papini, his character and their subsequent custody dispute, her relationship with ex-boyfriend James Reyes, and the post-nuptial agreement in place at the time of her disappearance. It also examines the FBI's investigative approach and rationale for concluding the case was a hoax, and attempts to question the evidentiary basis for some of their conclusions.

In the series and accompanying interviews, Papini claimed that all her injuries—including bruises, a waist chain, and a brand—were inflicted non-consensually by Reyes during her alleged abduction. However, Reyes denied the allegation and passed a law enforcement-administered polygraph, stating that Papini had voluntarily stayed with him and that she both inflicted some injuries herself and asked him to assist in others, including the branding. Medical examiners and an FBI criminal analyst concluded that the wounds were consistent with deliberate, self-inflicted or controlled injuries rather than signs of prolonged abuse or forced captivity. Papini also claimed to have bite marks on her body, which forensic experts later determined were actually rashes.

Papini had a documented history of self-harm and falsely reporting abuse. In 2003, her mother filed a report with the Shasta County Sheriff's Office alleging that Papini had been harming herself and blaming the injuries on others.

== See also ==
- Carlee Russell disappearance hoax
- Fake kidnapping, listing notable recent examples
- Runaway bride case, a 2005 abduction hoax in Georgia, United States
