= Runaway bride case =

Case of Jennifer Wilbanks, who faked a kidnapping

The runaway bride case concerns Jennifer Carol Wilbanks (born February 28, 1973), an American woman who ran away from her home in Duluth, Georgia on April 26, 2005, to avoid her wedding with John Mason, her fiancé, on April 30. Her disappearance sparked a nationwide search and intensive media coverage, including media speculation that Mason had killed her. On April 29, Wilbanks called Mason from Albuquerque, New Mexico, and falsely claimed that she had been kidnapped and sexually assaulted by a Hispanic man and a white woman.

Wilbanks gained notoriety in the United States and internationally, and her story persisted as a major topic of national news coverage for some time after she was found unharmed. Many critics of the mass media attacked the coverage as a "media circus". Journalist Howard Kurtz wrote that the runaway bride had become a "runaway television embarrassment", comparing the story to a TV soap opera.

Wilbanks repeated the false claims that fell apart under FBI interrogation resulting in a felony indictment of providing false information to law enforcement, a charge that could have resulted in up to five years of imprisonment. On June 2, 2005, she pleaded no contest to this charge. As part of her plea bargain, she was sentenced to two years of probation and 120 hours of community service, and she was also ordered to pay $2,250 in restitution to the Gwinnett County Sheriff's Department. As part of the plea bargain, a misdemeanor charge of filing a false police report was dismissed. Wilbanks's criminal record was expunged after her probation ended.

== Timeline ==
On April 26, 2005, Mason notified police that Wilbanks was missing two hours after she failed to return from her evening jog. The next day, people began to take part in the search for Wilbanks. Local police speculated publicly that Wilbanks' disappearance might be "a case of the premarital jitters," but the search continued. The mayor of Duluth later reported the city spent between $40,000 and $60,000 in the search. Police received numerous pieces of evidence that later turned out to be false leads, including large clumps of dark brown hair in an area next to a retention pond, a variety of clothing, and purported murder weapons.

On April 28, Major Donald L. Woodruff of the City of Duluth's Police Department announced that because there were no other explanations, Wilbanks' disappearance was being handled as a criminal investigation. The FBI and the Georgia Bureau of Investigation were now involved in the case.

On April 29, Wilbanks' relatives offered a $100,000 reward and planned vigils. Later that day, Wilbanks called Mason from a pay phone and told him that she had been kidnapped, but had just been released. She also called 911, declaring in a frantic voice that she had been kidnapped and sexually assaulted by a Hispanic man and a Caucasian woman in their 40s driving a blue van. When asked if she knew what direction her captors went after setting her free, she said, "I have no idea. I don't even know where I am." The calls were traced to a pay phone at a 7-Eleven convenience store in Albuquerque, New Mexico, where she was picked up by local police. Her family publicly thanked the media for getting through to the kidnappers. Later, during FBI interrogation, Wilbanks admitted that she had not been abducted, but needed time and space to escape the pressures of her upcoming wedding. On May 9 Wilbanks entered a treatment facility "to address physical and mental issues which, she believes, played a major role in her running from herself."

Wilbanks canceled her engagement to her fiancé on May 17. On May 25 Wilbanks was charged with making false statements. Wilbanks reached an agreement with the city of Duluth on May 31 to repay more than $13,000 in costs incurred by the city in their search.

== Aftermath and lawsuit ==
On May 22, 2006, People magazine reported that Wilbanks and Mason had officially called off their engagement.

According to the BBC, Jennifer Wilbanks sold the media rights to her story to a New York City company for $500,000. Wilbanks did not offer to repay the whole cost of the search for her, which totaled almost $43,000.

In September 2006, Wilbanks filed a lawsuit against her ex-fiancé, claiming that while she was hospitalized and under medication, she granted Mason power of attorney to negotiate the sale of the couple's story to a publisher in New York. According to her, Mason negotiated a deal for $500,000 and then used the money to buy a house, in his name only, from which he later evicted Wilbanks. She claimed $250,000 as her share of the house, and another $250,000 in punitive damages. Mason countersued, claiming emotional distress from being left at the altar. In December 2006, both of the parties dropped their respective lawsuits.

On March 15, 2008, Wilbanks's ex-fiancé, John Mason, married another woman in a quiet ceremony at his parents' home in Duluth, Georgia. In June 2010, Wilbanks announced via Facebook that she had been in a relationship since early in 2009. Wilbanks married businessman Greg Hutson in March of 2010; the couple divorced in April 2021.

== Impact of the events ==
Herobuilders, a manufacturer of action figures, rushed to produce a doll representing Wilbanks, wearing a jogging suit bearing the slogan "Vegas baby". It came with a small towel, to put over the doll's head, to model how she appeared on TV when in the custody of Albuquerque Police.

Wilbanks has inspired a "Runaway Bride" action figure and a hot sauce called "Jennifer's High Tailin' Hot Sauce". An auction on eBay of a slice of toast carved with a likeness of Wilbanks closed with a winning bid of $15,400.

Nearly two years after Wilbanks ran away, the incident was used by the Albuquerque Police Department as a means of attracting new recruits to the police force. The police department used the image of a bride in a white wedding dress and veil being apprehended by Police Officer Trish Hoffman, posted on a billboard with the advertisement reading "Running away from your current job? Call APD Recruiting" followed by the police department's telephone number. Hoffman was the officer who was pictured in the media leading Wilbanks through Albuquerque International Sunport after being taken into custody. The Police Department's reasoning for using the image was that many people would recognize the reference to the incident and that people still talked about the incident.

A musical play based on the story of Jennifer Wilbanks opened on March 13, 2008, at the Red Clay Theater in Duluth, Georgia.

A photo of Wilbanks appears in the trailer of the 2008 movie about professional poker, The Grand, as one of the many women Woody Harrelson's character has been married to in the past.

Wilbanks' case is frequently referenced in both scholarly and popular articles and books. In 2012 Psychology Today wrote an article about cold feet that cited Wilbanks as an example. Diana M. Concannon textbook Kidnapping: An Investigator’s Guide began its chapter on staged kidnappings by using Wilbanks' case as an example.

== See also ==
- Missing white woman syndrome
- Runaway Bride (1999 film)
- Carlee Russell disappearance hoax
- Sherri Papini kidnapping hoax
