= Carlee Russell disappearance hoax =

2023 disappearance hoax

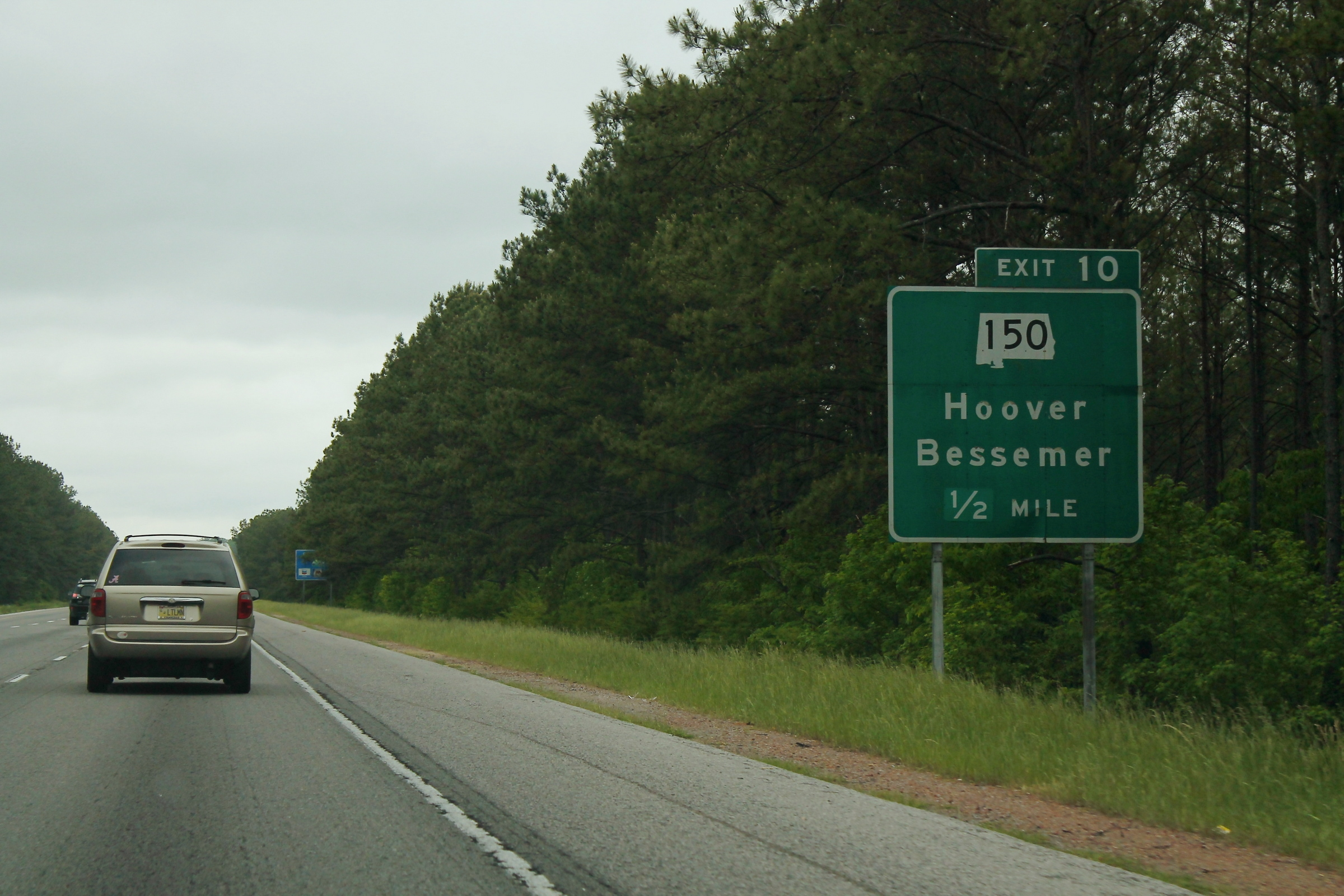
Russell reportedly called 911 from Interstate 459 near the Alabama State Route 150 exit on the evening of July 13, 2023.

On July 13, 2023, nursing student Carlethia Nichole Russell (born July 22, 1997) disappeared for 49 hours in Hoover, Alabama before reappearing and falsely reporting a kidnapping claim to police. The story of her disappearance earned wide attention via social media platforms. On July 24, Russell admitted she had fabricated the story, and had not been abducted. She was sentenced to a year's probation in March 2024.

== Disappearance and claims ==
Russell made a 911 call at 9:34 pm on July 13, which has been publicly released. In the call, she says that she has stopped at the side of Interstate 459 having seen an unattended young child on the side of the highway. She then called a family member to report the same situation, before losing contact with them, with the line remaining open. Russell's car was found by police abandoned at the location she had described.

Russell appeared at her parents' house 49 hours later, on July 15, and was taken to the hospital where she was briefly questioned by police. In that interview, Russell reported having been abducted by a male and placed inside a tractor-trailer. She said she was able to escape, but was recaptured and placed in a car. She claimed to have been undressed and photographed while blindfolded, though not bound at the wrists to avoid causing ligature marks, and said that she escaped again, eventually returning home.

Crime Stoppers raised more than $63,000 in reward money for the search of Russell.

== Doubt and admission ==
The Hoover police department and investigators stated that they had been "unable to verify" most of Russell's statement, and that "continuing investigation had cast doubt on much of Ms. Russell's account." Among her web-searches in the days before her disappearance were "Do you have to pay for an Amber alert", "How to take money from a register without being caught", "Birmingham bus station", "One way bus ticket from Birmingham to Nashville", and the abduction film Taken. The Hoover Police Department stated in a press release that they had "not found any evidence of a child walking on the side of the road" nor did they "receive any additional calls about a toddler walking down the interstate."

On July 24, 2023, Russell later admitted through her attorney, Emory Anthony, that her kidnapping claim was a hoax. Her attorney stated: "There was no kidnapping on Thursday, July 13, 2023. My client did not see a baby on the side of the road. My client did not leave the Hoover area when she was identified as a missing person. My client did not have any help in this incident — this was a single act done by herself. My client was not with anyone or any hotel with anyone from the time she was missing. My client apologizes for her actions to the community, the volunteers who were searching for her, to the Hoover Police Department and other agencies, as well as to her friends and family."

Russell was charged with two class A misdemeanors for faking the abduction: false reporting to law enforcement authorities and falsely reporting an incident.

== Conviction ==
Russell pleaded not guilty to charges of false reporting to law enforcement authorities and falsely reporting an incident, but was found guilty by Municipal Judge Brad Bishop on October 11, 2023 based on the recommendation of state prosecutors. In municipal court, there is no jury trial, however the constitution allows anyone facing jail time to have their case heard by a jury, which Russell's defense attorneys indicated she would be appealing to do.

Bishop recommended one year in jail and $17,874 in restitution for Russell. He also recommended two fines of $831 each. Russell's attorneys argued against jail time, stating it would be unusual for a first time Class A misdemeanor.

In March 2024, Russell pled guilty to two counts of filing false police reports and was sentenced to a year of probation and 100 hours of community service. She was also ordered to pay an $18,000 fine. After pleading guilty, Russell stated that she "made a grave mistake while trying to fight through various emotional issues and stress" and portrayed her actions as a cry for help.

== See also ==
- Runaway bride case
- Sherri Papini kidnapping hoax
