= Brian Cummings =

American voice actor

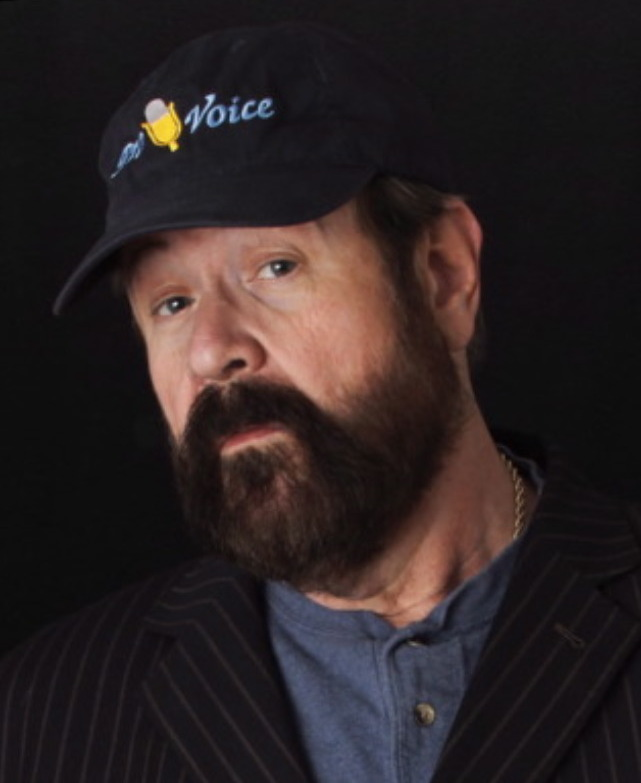
- Born: Brian Cummings
- Occupation: Voice actor
- Years active: 1977–present
- Spouse: Carla Cummings
- Children: 8

Brian Cummings is an American voice actor. He is known for his work in commercials, television and motion picture promos, cartoons and as the announcer on The All-New Let's Make a Deal from 1984 to 1985.

== Life and career ==
Having begun the pursuit of his chosen career at a local radio station (KSDN) in Aberdeen, South Dakota, during his senior year in high school, Brian set his sights high and has continued to "talk" a lot. His mentor was Daws Butler who taught him voiceover.

Brian was the closing announcer for ALF in syndication, and he, along with Mark Elliott, has been one of the long-time voices of Buena Vista Home Entertainment (now Walt Disney Studios Home Entertainment) trailers and promotions. He also did some narrations for some Sony Pictures Home Entertainment trailers, but is perhaps more known for his extensive work for Paramount Home Entertainment.

Cummings has performed in multiple animated series since the 1980s. Among his most famous roles are those of Dimmy in The Snorks, Morton Fizzback and Professor Funt in Denver, the Last Dinosaur, Mr. Hollywood in 2 Stupid Dogs, Doctor Mindbender in G.I. Joe, Clyde Cat in Tom & Jerry Kids, Papa Q. Bear in The Berenstain Bears, and Doofus Drake in DuckTales, he can also be heard as the voice of Dr. Sokolov in the Metal Gear video game franchise.

== Personal life ==
Cummings is married to his wife Carla. They have eight children.

== Filmography ==
=== Animation ===
==== Theatrical films ====
- Jetsons: The Movie (1990) – Movie Announcer
- Beauty and the Beast (1991) – The Stove
- FernGully: The Last Rainforest (1992) – Ock

==== Direct-to-video films ====
- G.I. Joe: The Movie (1987) – Doctor Mindbender
- A Flintstones Christmas Carol (1994) – Ghost of Christmas Present
- Scooby-Doo! in Arabian Nights (1994) – Sultan
- Annabelle's Wish (1997) – Brewster
- K10C: Kids' Ten Commandments (2003 film series) – Aron, God, Raca

==== Television ====
- Spider-Man (1981) – ESU Principal (in "The Pied Piper of New York Town"), General (in "The Pied Piper of New York Town")
- The Little Rascals (1982) – Captain Smokey (in "Cap'n Spanky's Showboat")
- Snorks (1984) – Dimmy Finster
- The Berenstain Bears (1985–1987) - Papa Q. Bear
- G.I. Joe: A Real American Hero (1986) – Doctor Mindbender
- 2 Stupid Dogs (1993–1995) – Mr. Hollywood
- Animaniacs – Announcer (ep. Smell Ya Later 1994)
- The Daltons (2010–2012) – William Dalton
- We Wish You a Merry Walrus (2014) – Merry Walrus

=== Video games ===
- Tron: Solar Sailer (1982) – MCP
- The Mark of Kri (2002) – Baumusu
- Metal Gear Solid 3: Snake Eater (2004) – Sokolov
- Metal Gear Solid: Portable Ops (2006) – Sokolov, Ghost
- Sekiro: Shadows Die Twice (2019) – Sculptor

=== Live-action ===
- Hughes and Harlow: Angels in Hell (1977) – Assistant Director
- California Suite (1978) – Autograph Seeker
- Where the Buffalo Roam (1980) – Richard Nixon (voice)
- ALF (1986) – Announcer (TV promos and closing for syndicated reruns)
- The All-New Let's Make a Deal (1984–1985) – Announcer
- Fun House (1988) – Announcer (pilot episode only)
- Pikes Peak By Rail (1991) – Narrator
- Good Burger (1997) – Announcer (Trailers and promos)
- Most Shocking (2006–2010) – Announcer
- Most Daring (2007–2010) – Announcer
- World's Wildest Vacation Videos (2008–2009) – Narrator
- Transformers: Revenge of the Fallen (2009) – Announcer (for RPMs Toy Promo)
