= One Big Happy Family =

- Country of origin: United States
- No. of seasons: 2
- No. of episodes: 10 (7 unaired)

Production
- Executive producers: Chris Coelen; Julia Silverton; Mike Duffy
- Running time: 25 minutes
- Production company: Zodiak USA

Original release
- Network: TLC
- Release: December 29, 2009 – August 3, 2010

One Big Happy Family is an American reality television series featuring the Coles family, an African-American family of four who reside in Indian Trail, North Carolina. The series premiered on TLC on December 29, 2009. The show deals with their family life and with their efforts to lose weight, (each family member, at the initial episode, weighed in excess of 330 pounds).

== Cast ==
The numbers in parentheses are the age and weight of each family member when the first episode aired.

- Tameka Coles - (36 years old, 380 lbs) Mother of Amber and Shayne and wife of Norris. She works two jobs that leave her little time to get any exercise. She tells the viewers that she began to gain weight after giving birth to Amber and Shayne.
- Norris Coles - (41 years old, 340 lbs) Father of Amber and Shayne and husband of Tameka. He is mainly a stay-at-home parent, though he buys and sells garage sales items for profit.
- Amber Coles - (17 years old, 348 lbs) Amber is the older of the two children. She is a member of the flag corps at her high school.
- Shayne Coles - (14 years old, 336 lbs) Shayne is the younger of the two children.

== Episodes ==
=== Series overview ===
Season	Episodes	Originally released	
Season	Episodes	First released	Last released
1	6	December 29, 2009	January 12, 2010
2	4 (7 unaired)	June 1, 2010	August 3, 2010

=== Season 1 (2009–10) ===
No. overall	No. in series	Title	Original release date
1	1	"Troubling News"	December 29, 2009
We are introduced to the Coles family. The first scenes show them feasting without inhibition before the camera, enjoying large meals of rich comfort food around the dining-room table. Then they visit a water park, hoping, Tameka says, to get some exercise. While there, after enjoying several rides and slides, they discover that they cannot ride a "tunnel" slide because they exceed the allowed weight (a combined 400 pounds for a minimum of two people). They console themselves with several servings of sugary funnel cake. At a doctor's appointment, accompanied by the family, Shayne learns some troubling news about his blood sugar: it is too high, and if he doesn't lose weight, he's told, he can expect to develop Type II diabetes.
2	2	"We Must Change"	December 29, 2009
Tameka and Shayne are anxious to start getting in shape, while Amber and Norris are not. Visits to the family's various doctors disclose that everyone is in danger of complications if he or she doesn't lose weight. Norris has a fit while Shayne throws away groceries that Norris just bought the day before. Everyone realizes that they all must start exercising and eating healthier.
3	3	"Yard Sale"	January 5, 2010
Tameka orders the family to gather up all their surplus junk for a yard sale. Tameka wants to price all the items cheap to sell fast; however, Norris wants to sell his items (which he bought at other yard sales in hopes of making a tidy profit) at higher prices. The night before the yard sale, Tameka shows how little she knows about "cooking healthy" when she must toss out a pan of skinless chicken breasts, then expects the family to dine solely on the broccoli she has boiled to go with it. Most of the broccoli goes uneaten. The next day, Norris drives customers away with his high-pressure sales tactics. One customer audaciously calls Shayne fat to his face; Tameka tells him off. The family does manage to collect more than a hundred dollars from the sale, and the items that did not sell are loaded up for donation to Goodwill.
4	4	"I Love You All Over Again"	January 5, 2010
Norris never proposed to Tameka because she was the one to give him an ultimatum when their children were already six and four years old: marry her or leave. So he married her. He always felt bad about not properly proposing to her. Norris asks his children to help him write out a proposal, and this inspires the kids to write a rap about how great their mother is. Norris and the kids surprise Tameka at a friend's house and she is reminded how much she is loved. Inadvertent comedy is supplied when Amber breaks her chair, but even Shayne empathizes instead of making fun of her.
5	5	"Camping"	January 12, 2010
The family decides to go on a camping trip, riding in an RV because it is a new experience and they aren't sure they're ready to "rough it" as such. Shayne brings his friend Tyler along with them; his slender size makes it obvious he's not one of the family. They prove to be unready to "rough it" when they begin the night outside, but the bugs and night sounds scare them back into the RV. Amber sprains her ankle climbing an artificial rock formation.
6	6	"Family Portrait"	January 12, 2010
Tameka, in charge as always, decides a family portrait is in order to show how far they've come in weight loss already and to show how much farther they'll have come later on. She and Amber go shopping for clothes for the picture and both mother and daughter are gratified to see that each has dropped several sizes. Shayne and his father need new clothes, too, and when they go shopping, Tameka goes along, ordering not just the fourteen-year-old but her husband to dress as Mama dictates. By the time of the actual trip to the photographer, the members of the family are barely speaking to each other, but ultimately the excursion goes well.

=== Season 2 (2010) ===
No. overall	No. in series	Title	Original release date
7	1	"Amber's First Love"	June 1, 2010
The Coles come back to kick start the season with a new and improved outlook on life. Tameka decides this is the perfect time to have a dinner party and invites family and friends. Amber introduces her new love and everyone has an opinion about him.
8	2	"Frills and Bills"	June 1, 2010
Tameka looks for a new career, so the family helps her out with her interviewing skills. Meanwhile, Norris and Shayne have trouble with the car, and Amber is on the hunt for the perfect prom dress.
9	3	"Amber and Tameka's Dance Class"	June 8, 2010
Norris and Tameka worry that Amber and Shayne's weight loss efforts have hit a plateau. When a trip to the doctor's office confirms their fears, Norris and Tameka must think outside the box to inspire and motivate the kids into working out more.
10	4	"Babies and Big Rigs"	August 3, 2010
Tameka is looking for a new career at a truck driving school. Amber and Shayne visit their friend who recently had a baby, and when they come home, their parents want to have a talk with them about the birds and the bees.
