= Charlie Vandergaw =

American who lived with bears in Alaska (1938–2025)

- Born: Charles Edward Vandergaw; June 2, 1938; Lakeview, Oregon, U.S.
- Died: March 30, 2025 (aged 86); Anchorage, Alaska, U.S.
- Occupations: Schoolteacher; Wrestling coach; Lodge operator; Animal behaviorist
- Years active: 1980s–2025

Charles Edward Vandergaw (June 2, 1938 – March 30, 2025) was an American schoolteacher from Anchorage, Alaska. He was known for having spent over 30 years of his life living amongst bears in the state of Alaska. Vandergaw was the subject of a 2009 Animal Planet documentary titled Stranger Among Bears.

== Biography ==
Charles Edward Vandergaw was born on June 2, 1938, in Lakeview, Oregon. Vandergaw moved to Anchorage, Alaska in 1964 and soon found work as a schoolteacher. For much of his career, he worked as a science teacher and wrestling coach at Dimond High School. By 1988, after retiring from this profession, he began pursuing a passion for outdoors-related activities. This included what was originally intended as a hunting lodge, but instead became a facility for viewing bears, located at the foot of a mountain in the Yentna River valley. He was the subject of a 2009 television documentary series titled Stranger Among Bears aired on Animal Planet.

Although against the law of the State of Alaska, the repeated and regular feeding of grizzlies and black bears over many years enabled Vandergaw to habituate these animals to him, thus allowing him to studying their patterns of behavior. In 2010, Vandergaw pleaded guilty to violation of the law, and was given a 180-days suspended jail sentence, plus a $20,000 fine.

Vandergaw died at home on March 30, 2025, after a four-year battle with Parkinson's disease. He was 86.
