= World's Wildest Vacation Videos =

American reality television series (2008–2009)

- Genre: Reality television; Clip show
- Narrated by: Brian Cummings
- Country of origin: United States
- Original language: English
- No. of seasons: 2
- No. of episodes: 19

Production
- Executive producers: David Dean; Jonathan Koch; Steven Michaels
- Producers: Rick Davis; Todd Ludy
- Running time: 21 minutes
- Production company: Asylum Entertainment

Original release
- Network: truTV
- Release: December 10, 2008 – September 17, 2009

World's Wildest Vacation Videos is an American reality television series that aired on TruTV from December 10, 2008 to September 17, 2009 for 19 episodes over 2 seasons. The show was narrated by Brian Cummings (who has previously narrated reality clip shows on other TruTV/Court TV shows).

== Synopsis ==
The series showcases videos recorded by people in frightening and funny situations (presumably on vacation) from disasters to animals.
