= I'm Alive (TV series) =

2009 American reality TV series

- Genre: Reality; Documentary
- Opening theme: "If Everyone Cared" performed by Nickelback
- Country of origin: United States
- Original language: English
- No. of seasons: 2
- No. of episodes: 22

Production
- Running time: 45 minutes
- Production company: Gurney Productions

Original release
- Network: Animal Planet
- Release: October 9, 2009 – May 19, 2011

I'm Alive is an American reality television series that featured death-defying stories of people determined to survive any kind of animal attacks, including reenactments by actors, although deaths had occurred. The series premiered on Animal Planet on October 9, 2009 and ended its run on May 19, 2011. No further episodes were produced beyond the end date.

== Episodes ==
=== Season One (2009) ===
No.	Title	Original release date
1	"Journeys"	October 9, 2009
Mike Makens is bitten by a black widow and spends 7 days in excruciating pain as his family tries to procure antivenom from Mexico. Jeremy McGill is a teacher in China, when a friend suggests he see some wild elephants. He travels 1,400 miles to do that and is promptly gored after spooking them. Animals: Black widow spider and Asian elephant
2	"Blood Saviors"	October 9, 2009
Craig Hutto, 16, is attacked by a bull shark on a beach in Florida, eventually losing his leg. At a wedding deep in the South African bush, Piet van der Walt is mauled by a leopard who was aiming for his head. Animals: Bull shark and leopard
3	"Battlegrounds"	October 16, 2009
Sgt. Monique Munro-Harris is stung by a deathstalker scorpion in Iraq, and needs to be airlifted through enemy positions to survive. Dane Keiser is pulled under a fence by three lions in a South African game reserve and is seriously injured. Animals: Deathstalker scorpion and lion
4	"Saved"	October 23, 2009
While hiking in the woods with a friend, off-duty deputy sheriff Brandon Parker is bitten by an eastern diamondback rattlesnake and he collapses while attempting to walk back to his truck. Tonga Loumoli is eviscerated by a crocodile needlefish while diving at night, and his diving partner must drag him a quarter mile on a raft to shore. Animals: Eastern diamondback rattlesnake and crocodile needlefish
5	"Gold"	October 30, 2009
Achmat Hassiem, a lifeguard and prospective Olympian, has his foot ripped off by a great white during a training exercise. Bruce Kanegai, the karate expert, is struck by a southern pacific rattlesnake while playing golf. Animals: Great white shark and South Pacific rattlesnake
6	"Out of the Blue"	November 6, 2009
Karen and Charlie Folger are swarmed by killer bees while visiting their new house in the Texas countryside. Krishna Thompson is mauled by a bull shark in the Bahamas during a wedding anniversary celebration. Animals: Killer bees and bull shark
7	"Brotherhood"	November 13, 2009
Gary Brown, Melvin Mammah, two other Americans and a local guide are attacked by a massive escaped chimpanzee while visiting a chimpanzee sanctuary. The guide has his entire face eaten off and dies, while some of the others receive serious injuries. A European viper strikes tourist David Dunn in France, leaving his brother to get him to safety. Animals: Common chimpanzee and European viper
8	"Last Man Standing"	November 20, 2009
Dr. John Raster, an ear, nose and throat specialist, is mauled by a brown bear while on vacation, and he is beyond earshot of his friends. Danie Pienaar, a wildlife specialist, is stricken by a black mamba while deep in the African bush, and he needs to hike to his car to drive out and survive. Animals: Brown bear and black mamba
9	"A New Day"	November 27, 2009
During an engagement celebration, 18-year-old Kasey Edwards is mauled by an alligator and loses his arm; Bruce Campton is struck five times by a death adder. Animals: American alligator and death adder
10	"Lost"	December 4, 2009
Susan Cenkus and her two children are attacked by a black bear in a forest in Tennessee, and her daughter Elora Petrasek, 6, dies. Both Susan and Luke, her two-year-old son, are badly injured. Lawrence van Sertima is struck by a taipan on September 11, 2001, and the only antivenom available cannot be accessed; being a six-hour flight away, with all planes grounded due to the attacks on the World Trade Center and the Pentagon. Animals: Black bear and taipan

=== Season Two (2011) ===
No.	Title	Original release date
11	"Living Nightmare"	March 2, 2011
Farmer Vernon Diggins in South Africa is attacked by a Mozambique spitting cobra that was curled up under his pillow, his middle finger nearly needed amputation. Nick Greeve is on a rafting trip in Utah when he is attacked by a black bear. His friends must row him 60 miles, over rapids and in the soaring heat, to help, while he is bleeding to death. Animals: Mozambique spitting cobra and black bear
12	"Trial by Fire"	March 9, 2011
While doing yard work after Hurricane Katrina, teenager Patrick Dodson accidentally rips a bag full of mulch and fire ants, the contents of which are sprayed all over his legs. He suffers an allergic reaction and nearly dies. Game ranger Rudi Lorist is leading tourists through the wilderness in South Africa, when he is charged by a lioness. He shoots it once, then it gets up again and catches him off-guard. Animals: Fire ants and lion
13	"Death Wish"	March 16, 2011
A wildlife specialist and helicopter crash survivor JJ van Altena is charged by an elephant which overturns his truck, leaving him trapped underneath. Eric Ebinger is stricken by a prairie rattlesnake while camping, and his son Rio, just 10 years old, must row him one and a half hours upstream to help. Animals: African elephant and prairie rattlesnake
14	"Eaten Alive"	March 23, 2011
Teenager Hoku Aki is mauled by a tiger shark while surfing in Hawaii, and loses his leg below the knee. Gerald Marois climbs a tree to escape from a black bear, which promptly brings him down and mauls him. Animals: Tiger shark and black bear
15	"Ambushed"	March 30, 2011
Two students, Rusty van Wert and Caleb Snow, are bitten by a cottonmouth snake after it was misidentified by a teacher and allowed to be a class pet. A Marine, Cpl. Justin Trinidad, saves couple Patricia and Javier Franco from a bull hippo in Zimbabwe after they fall from their boat. Animals: Cottonmouth snake and hippo
16	"Sacrifice"	March 30, 2011
Colton Reeb is attacked by a cougar on a camping trip, and Robbie Hamouda is bitten by a redback spider after he and a friend become lost in the Australian Outback. Animals: Cougar and redback spider
17	"Guardians"	March 30, 2011
Yolanda Diaz is bitten by a water moccasin on both arms and risks losing them. Jonathan Skyes is attacked by an elephant in Kenya, his friend must get him to safety. Animals: Water moccasin and African elephant
18	"One Last Shot"	April 20, 2011
Dakota Kilbride is attacked by a crocodile in Costa Rica while surfing. Ron Leming Jr. is mauled by a grizzly in Wyoming while bow hunting with his father. Animals: American crocodile and grizzly bear
19	"Out Of Reach"	April 27, 2011
A humpback whale rams a sailboat, leaving Eugenie Russell and her four crew members no choice but to abandon their sinking ship; Michael Alex White is bitten by a fer-de-lance while in the Guatemalan jungle. Animals: Humpback whale and fer-de-lance
20	"Reborn"	May 3, 2011
Fifteen-year-old Jeanna Giese contracts rabies after being bitten by a bat. In South Africa, Craig Bovim is stalked and attacked by a great white shark on Christmas Day. Animals: Bat and great white shark
21	"Hidden Danger"	May 14, 2011
In Montana, Steve Chamberlain and a friend struggles through miles of dark woods in search of help after being attacked by three grizzly bears. Matt Greenbury is stung by a venomous Irukandji jellyfish while in vacation with his girlfriend, on an island in Australia. Animals: Grizzly bear and Irukandji jellyfish
22	"Resurrection"	May 19, 2011
JP Andrew is attacked by a great white shark while surfing with friends in South Africa. Cathy Hayes is charged by a bison while recording on video in Yellowstone National Park. Animals: Great white shark and bison
