= Veatrice Rice =

American television personality (1949–2009)

- Born: Veatrice Elizabeth Martin; October 1, 1949; Atlanta, Georgia, U.S.
- Died: January 21, 2009 (aged 59); Los Angeles, California, U.S.
- Other name: Miss V
- Occupations: Television personality; security guard; nurse
- Known for: Jimmy Kimmel Live!
- Spouse: John Rice (2002–2009, her death)
- Children: Ronald A. Rice, Kai'chon C. Rice

Veatrice Rice (October 1, 1949 – January 21, 2009) was a nurse turned security guard and television personality, best known for her appearances on Jimmy Kimmel Live!, where she served as a sidekick for comedian Jimmy Kimmel. Born in Atlanta, Georgia, and raised in Bowling Green, Kentucky, Rice worked as a parking lot security guard in the building where Jimmy Kimmel Live! is taped. With the two other security guards on staff at the program, she performed in a variety of skits and the recurring segment "Worst Team on Television". Veatrice was characterized by her wry, sarcastic demeanor, with quiet moments punctuated by outbursts of obscene language.

Rice died of cancer on January 21, 2009. A montage of some of her funniest moments was played in her honor on Jimmy Kimmel Live! the following day.
