= Addicted to Beauty =

American reality television show

- Created by: Scott Dunlop ( creator of Real Housewives of Orange County)
- Starring: Dianne York-Goldman; Gilbert W. Lee, MD, F.A.C.S.; Gary Erwin; Melanie "Mel" Bivins; Natasha Porlas; Ronnie Morgan; Shannyn Pareo
- Country of origin: United States
- No. of seasons: 1
- No. of episodes: 8

Production
- Executive producers: Mike Duffy; Greg Goldman; Chris Coelen
- Running time: 45–48 minutes
- Production companies: RDF USA and Intuitive Entertainment

Original release
- Network: Oxygen
- Release: August 4 – September 22, 2009

Addicted to Beauty is an American reality television show on the Oxygen US television channel about a plastic surgery and day spa located in San Diego, California.

== Synopsis ==
The show focuses on the relationships between the staff at the Changes Plastic Surgery practice (owned by Dr. Lee) and the new business partnership by Dr. Lee and Dianne York-Goldman. Although the show featured the practice being located in the heart of downtown La Jolla, it is actually located in the upscale community of Carmel Valley, San Diego.

== Cast ==
Dianne York-Goldman - Recently divorced after an 11-year marriage, York-Goldman ran a premiere medical spa of her own with her dermatologist husband for 7 years. In the show, York-Goldman entered into a business agreement with Dr. Lee to launch her own day spa with Dr. Lee's practice. Here she is in charge of marketing and promotions.

Gilbert W. Lee, MD, F.A.C.S. -- A San Diego resident and founder of the Changes Plastic Surgery & Spa which opened in 1994.

Gary Erwin - From La Jolla, CA, Gary is a plastic surgery consultant for the practice. He's the token stereotypical gay character and primary instigator.

Melanie "Mel" Bivins - Originally from Fort Lauderdale, Florida, Bivins is the office manager of the practice.

Natasha Porlas - Porlas has been working in the beauty industry since 2004. She was born and raised in San Diego and is also the face for Dr. Lee's skin care line of specialty products. Natasha is Dianne's executive assistant and is also the event coordinator. The show highlights the confrontations between her and Dianne.

Ronnie Morgan - From Johnstown, Ohio, Morgan has been working in the beauty industry since he was 18. He is the concierge at the practice.

Shannyn Pareo - Pareo is from Bosque Farms, New Mexico, and has been in the beauty industry since 1999. She is the spa's marketing director and supervisor. She oversees all operations of the spa under Dianne.

== Episodes ==
No.	Title	Original release date
1	"Changes in the Air"	August 4, 2009
2	"Show Me the Money"	August 11, 2009
3	"Have You Seen Dianne?"	August 18, 2009
4	"The Devil Wears Bronzer"	August 25, 2009
5	"The Ultimate Facelift"	September 1, 2009
6	"Who's the Boss"	September 8, 2009
7	"Mascara-Gate"	September 15, 2009
8	"Coup de Natasha"	September 22, 2009
