= Mark Mandala =

American television executive (1937–2009)

Mark Mandala (born May 1, 1937; died July 11, 2009) was an American television executive who served as the President of the American Broadcasting Company (ABC) from 1985 until 1994. He retired in 1994 after a 32-year career with ABC.

Mandala worked in a number of sales positions in Los Angeles, San Francisco, Chicago and New York City prior to joining ABC in 1962.

He was appointed the President of local ABC owned local stations division of the company in 1983. Mandala was responsible for the management of local stations which were directly owned by ABC, but not its affiliates.

Mandala was married to his wife, Joan Neely Mandala, for 48 years until his death. He had three sons, Steve, Charlie and Michael. He died of a heart attack while playing golf in Dorset, Vermont, on July 11, 2009, at the age of 72.

Preceded by John Severino	President of ABC; 1985-1994	Succeeded by ()
