= Dallas Divas & Daughters =

American reality television series

- Starring: Pamela Martin; Hannah Duarte; Brenda Johnson; Laura Johnson; Kenya Griffin; Chanel Flowers along with an ensemble cast
- Country of origin: United States
- Original language: English
- No. of seasons: 1
- No. of episodes: 8

Production
- Executive producers: Allison Grodner; Merah Chung; Peter Tartaglia; Sarah Weidman
- Production location: Dallas, Texas
- Running time: Approx. 22 minutes
- Production company: Allison Grodner Productions

Original release
- Network: Style Network, Bravo
- Release: October 4 – November 22, 2009

Dallas Divas & Daughters is an American reality television series on the Style Network and Bravo. The series debuted on October 4, 2009.

== Premise ==
The series follows a group of wealthy socialites and their daughters who reside in the Dallas, Texas area starring Pamela Martin Duarte and her daughter Hannah Martin Duarte, Kenya Griffin and daughter Chanel Flowers along with an ensemble cast. One of the goals of the show was to dispel some of the myths and perceptions about Texas lifestyles in a humorous tongue in cheek manner.

== Episodes ==
No.	Title	Original release date
1	"Everything's Bigger in Texas"	October 4, 2009
Five women and their daughters prepare for a polo event that launches the Dallas social season.
2	"Raising the Rich"	October 11, 2009
Daughters Chanel and Hannah prepare for their proms. The divas converse at a local wine bar.
3	"Don't Mess With Mean"	October 18, 2009
Pam attempts to keep an eye on her rebellious daughter as the countdown to the debutante ball begins.
4	"Catty Catwalk"	October 25, 2009
Hannah and Laura intern at a fashion show. Courtney and Danielle weed through a strange selection of characters to find Cindy's Mr. Right.
5	"Wicked Rich"	November 1, 2009
Laura and Hannah plan their mother's Texas-themed birthday party. Chanel hopes to receive a new Range Rover.
6	"Like Mother, Like Daughter"	November 8, 2009
Laura and Hannah display their gowns at the debutante photo shoot. Everyone is left speechless by Patty's graduation gift to Jacky.
7	"Finding Mr. Wrong"	November 15, 2009
Laura wants to invite Brenda's ex to her charity event. Jacky needs to find a job before college.
8	"She Said; She Said"	November 22, 2009
Chanel and Kenya host an end-of-summer music recital. Jacky gets ready to leave for college.
