= Campus PD =

American television show

- Genre: Nonfiction
- Theme music composer: Eddy Grant
- Opening theme: "Police on My Back" performed by The Clash
- Country of origin: United States
- Original language: English
- No. of seasons: 4
- No. of episodes: 46

Production
- Producer: Christine Calvalari
- Production location: Varies
- Running time: 22 minutes
- Production company: Cineflix

Original release
- Network: G4
- Release: December 9, 2009 – March 6, 2012

Campus PD is an American television show on G4. The show was produced by the UK-based production company Cineflix Productions, who also produced American Pickers (which airs on the History Channel in the United States) as well as Canadian Pickers (which airs on Canada's History Television).

The show is similar in style and tone to the TV series Cops. Unlike Cops, Campus PD focuses specifically on college and university campuses and towns and the authorities who patrol them, either using local police departments or the on-campus police departments maintained autonomously by the universities themselves. Filming takes place at various locations across the country. The theme song for the first two seasons was The Clash song "Police on My Back".

From January 10, 2017 to the fall season, reruns of Campus PD were seen on cable network Spike.

== Season 1 locations ==
- Florida State University: Tallahassee, Florida
- University of Cincinnati: The University of Cincinnati is an inner-city college with an enrollment of over 41,000. Agencies followed: University of Cincinnati Police Department; Cincinnati Police Division - District 5.
- Texas State University: Texas State's main campus is in San Marcos, a community of over 50,000 people about halfway between Austin and San Antonio. Located on the edge of the Texas Hill Country, Texas State's 30,000+ students enjoy a setting unique among Texas universities.
- California State University, Chico: The university, commonly called "Chico State", is the second-oldest campus in the California State University system. Situated on 119 acres (0.48 km^{2}) in downtown Chico, Chico State also owns a 1,050-acre (4.2 km^{2}) farm and 5 acres (20,000 m^{2}) of off-campus dorms about one mile (1.6 km) from the main campus. The university also manages 3,950-acre (16.0 km^{2}) Big Chico Creek Ecological Reserve and the 300-acre (1.2 km^{2}) Butte Creek Ecological Reserve.

== Season 2 locations ==
- Florida State University: Tallahassee, FL
- University of Cincinnati: The University of Cincinnati is an inner-city college with an enrollment of over 41,000. Agencies followed: University of Cincinnati Police Department; Cincinnati Police Division - District 5.
- New Mexico State University: The Las Cruces Police Department, also known as the LCPD, is the principal law enforcement agency of Las Cruces, New Mexico, under the jurisdiction of the city council and city manager of Las Cruces. It is the second largest municipal police department in New Mexico, with an authorized strength of 180 officers. Las Cruces Police Department shares responsibility with the New Mexico State University Police Department for the safety of students within the Las Cruces area.
- University of Central Arkansas: The University of Central Arkansas, a state-run institution located in the city of Conway, is the fourth largest university by enrollment in the state of Arkansas, and approximately 10% of UCA's more than 10,000 students belong to one of 21 Greek organizations hosted by the campus. The UCA Police Department has primary jurisdiction on all university properties, and practices the philosophy of community-oriented policing. The PD's relationships with community members are one of the most important tools used to accomplish its primary mission—to promote and maintain a safe and secure environment for UCA students, faculty, staff and visitors.
- Northern Kentucky University: Northern Kentucky University, a growing metropolitan university of more than 15,000 students, is located in the quiet suburb of Highland Heights. Kentucky, but is only seven miles southeast of Cincinnati. Agency followed: Highland Heights Southgate Police Authority.
- Binghamton University: The Binghamton Police Department currently has 141 sworn officers and 10 civilian employees. The Patrol Division is the largest component of the Binghamton Police Department, and is composed of 74 officers and 15 Supervisors. The Binghamton Police Department answered 66,305 calls for service in 2008.

== Season 3 locations ==
- Washington State University
- New Mexico State University
- Northern Michigan University
- Montclair State University
- University of Cincinnati
- University of West Georgia
- University of South Carolina
- Indiana University of Pennsylvania
- Indiana State University

== Season 4 locations ==
- University of North Carolina-Greensboro
- Indiana University of Pennsylvania
- New Mexico State University

== Indiana University of Pennsylvania (IUP) helicopter accident ==
On April 30, 2011 a helicopter associated with Campus PD crashed into student housing in Indiana, Pennsylvania, where the show was gathering video for a segment on Indiana University of Pennsylvania. FAA spokesman Jim Peters was quoted as stating that all the people on the helicopter had injuries ranging from minor to critical with two crew members and the pilot having serious to critical injuries and one crew member being able to walk away from the wreckage. The pilot was taken to Allegheny General Hospital (North Side) in Pittsburgh but his condition was not confirmed by a hospital spokesperson. The three passengers were all Canadian citizens. On May 24, 2011 one of the injured, Greg Jacobsen, died at Memorial Medical Center in Johnstown, PA from complications of his injuries. Jacobsen suffered multiple injuries and died of respiratory problems that developed during his recovery. Students inside the housing had to be relocated for the rest of Finals Week.

University spokeswoman Michelle Fryling said that Campus PD was working with Indiana Borough Police and IUP President Werner issued a statement that said IUP police were not involved and that "We are relieved that there were no injuries to students or others on the ground. The university was neither consulted nor involved in any arrangements related to this project."

Campus PD used footage shot at IUP, but did not use any footage shot from the helicopter. The show ended the season with a memorial episode to Jacobsen.

== Episode guide ==
=== Season 1 ===
The first season consisted of 10 episodes.

Episode number	Original airdate	Notable events
1-1	12-09-2009	House party; hit and run driver; campus preacher; marijuana bust.
1-2	12-16-2009	Possible alcohol overdose; public telephone vandal.
1-3	12-23-2009	Student lies about her age; van breaks down.
1-4	12-30-2009	Noise complaint becomes a drug bust; college women need help breaking up their party.
1-5	01-06-2010	Possible DUI; fight; car smells of marijuana.
1-6	01-13-2010	Rowdy house party; underage drinking; gun report; drunk student.
1-7	01-20-2010	Drunk college student; unconscious man in a parking lot.
1-8	01-27-2010	Student can't find home; drinking kids.
1-9	02-03-2010	Drunk college girl won't give her info.
1-10	02-10-2010	Suspicious students behind a dumpster; freshman has too much to drink.

=== Season 2 ===
The second season premiered on Wednesday, September 1 at 8PM ET.

Episode number	Original airdate	Notable events
2-1 (11)	09-01-2010	Angry man at party confronts officer; pickup truck with eight scantily-clad youths stopped; cops run driver through drunk tests and then find marijuana in the car; police stop a car with expired registration and officer Love finds an intimate stash with the help of the dogs.
2-2 (12)	09-08-2010	House party shut down and underage male busted for possession of alcohol; college student engaged in public urination is interrogated; a call about reckless driving leads to a confused driver who doesn't know who he is and has a pharmacy in his trunk; a party is shut down and a woman is arrested for falsification.
2-3 (13)	09-15-2010	Family feud between disorderly brother and an irate sister at a noisy party; drunk student resists arrest after a domestic dispute; cops interrogate a party-goer bleeding from the head and discover he participated in a fight with weapons.
2-4 (14)	09-22-2010	Intoxicated male resists arrest; shirtless male jogging home from a bar; open container male; rowdy underage non-male at a party in possession of alcohol and drug paraphernalia.
2-5 (15)	09-29-2010	Spring break edition: Underage drinking on the beach; disorderly conduct at the beach; minor banned from beach; stolen motorcycle in the beach area.
2-6 (16)	10-06-2010	Spring break in Florida; underage drinking; beach fight.
2-7 (17)	10-13-2010	Drunk American in Cancún; dancing woman stops traffic.
2-8 (18)	10-20-2010	A student's truck goes out of control on Crystal Beach; public urination.
2-9 (19)	10-27-2010	A partier gets too rowdy on the beach in Galveston.
2-10 (20)	11-03-2010	An unlicensed driver arrested and an underage house party busted in Galveston.
2-11 (21)	11-10-2010	A noise complaint causes an argument; DUI investigation; young woman passed out on a front lawn.
2-12 (22)	11-17-2010	Violent snowball fight with underage drinkers; young man loses a tooth.
2-13 (23)	11-24-2010	Two women fight; a student is unhappy with his noise complaint.
2-14 (24)	12-01-2010	Freshmen house party; traffic stop breaks up a date.
2-15 (25)	12-08-2010	Young man attacked with a baseball bat; drunk young woman.
2-16 (26)	12-15-2010	Student arrested for obstruction; surly party-goer.

=== Season 3 ===
Episode number	Original airdate	Notable events
3-1 (27)	01-19-2011	Cocaine possession suspect; noisy house party is shut down; drunk student knocks himself out.
3-2 (28)	01-26-2011	Uncontrollable house party; injured young woman in bed.
3-3 (29)	02-02-2011	Multiple parties in one apartment complex; verbally-abusive young woman.
3-4 (30)	02-09-2011	Disorderly conduct; tasered man.
3-5 (31)	02-16-2011	Campus cops stop two for illegally skateboarding; a crowd disperses; a house party is shut down.
3-6 (32)	02-23-2011	A party doorman fights with a woman; a woman wears traffic cone on her head; a male is arrested for drunk driving.
3-7 (33)	03-02-2011	A party host faces his third ticket; drunk young woman; alleged stalker is investigated.
3-8 (34)	03-09-2011	An underage woman with an open container tries to run from the law.
3-9 (35)	03-16-2011	A drunk male starts a fight at a bar; a young man's party is shut down; a female student is arrested for refusing to cooperate.
3-10 (36)	03-23-2011	A loud and intoxicated man is given five minutes to shut down his party; a drunk man has no idea where he is going.

=== Season 4 ===
Episode number	Original airdate	Notable events
4-1 (37)	01-03-2012	Noisy party; an assault on a bouncer is investigated; a student who's pulled over has an arrest warrant for marijuana
4-2 (38)	01-10-2012	Passengers drinking in the car; a student blocks police in doorway; a student refuses to pay a cab driver
4-3 (39)	01-17-2012	Noisy 21st birthday; polite DUI offender; beat-up and tired victim
4-4 (40)	01-24-2012	Unpaid lap dance; a girl who aspires to be a detective is detained; a suspect repeatedly shuts the door on an officer
4-5 (41)	01-31-2012	Bar dispute over the quality of a drink; Frat house warfare and vandalism; citation for underage student at noisy party
4-6 (42)	02-07-2012	Police bust up big graduation party; drunk pedestrian; tow truck dispute
4-7 (43)	02-14-2012	Public urination at a party leads to a dispute with the neighbors; drunk kids invite officer to play empty beer can baseball; minors in possession during a traffic stop and then the police call in the dogs.
4-8 (44)	02-21-2012	Drunk minor steals his neighbors flag; street fighting brawl interrupted - reasons behind the fight are unsuccessfully investigated; young couple pulled over near a park; drunk girl kicked out of a club tries to smoke a dollar bill.
4-9 (45)	02-28-2012	Cops clear kids out of party house and underage drinker tries to make a run for it; driver explains that she passed her own sobriety test; officer gets frustrated with a drunken party host whose guests refuse to leave
4-10 (46)	03-06-2012	Police deal with mouthy young men after they get kicked out of a club; a routine traffic stop turns into a baffling scenario in Kentucky; cops deal with the aftermath of a fight which leaves the participants bloodied and battered.
