= Raising Sextuplets =

Television series

- Starring: The Masche family
- Country of origin: United States
- Original language: English

Production
- Production locations: Arizona and Florida
- Running time: 46 minutes
- Production company: Eric Schiff Productions

Original release
- Network: WE tv
- Release: June 11, 2009 – August 12, 2010

Raising Sextuplets is a reality television series produced in the United States by Eric Schiff Productions about the Masche family, consisting of parents Bryan and Jenny Masche and their sextuplets. It aired on WE tv. The family originally appeared in a one-hour special titled OMG! Sextuplets! in 2008. The second season of Raising Sextuplets premiered on WE tv on June 24, 2010. In the United Kingdom, the show is known as "Ouch! Sextuplets".

== Family history ==
Jenny and Bryan met via email while Bryan was stationed in Kuwait with the Air Force. They were married a year later on January 2, 2004. Jenny is a physician assistant and Bryan is now a pharmaceutical salesman. They also own a real estate investment company. The sextuplets are the results of artificial insemination after Jenny had two miscarriages.

The babies were delivered at thirty weeks, four days at Banner Good Samaritan Medical Center in Phoenix, Arizona. The Masche babies were the second set of sextuplets to be born at Banner Good Samaritan Medical Center. The three boys and three girls weighed between 2 lbs., 1 oz. and 3 lbs. and were delivered by Cesarean section within about six minutes beginning at 8:21 a.m.

After delivery, Jenny's heart failed and she was rushed to an intensive care unit, where she nearly died due to complications from the extreme pregnancy. She recovered enough after five days to visit her sextuplets in the NICU. The babies spent about five weeks in the hospital after birth. Prior to Raising Sextuplets, the Masches appeared on television a few times: Bryan asked Jenny to marry him on national television at an Arizona Diamondbacks baseball game in 2003, the couple appeared on the Today show during the pregnancy and afterward, and Jenny competed on Deal or No Deal.

The family used to reside in Lake Havasu City, Arizona. They now reside in Destin, Florida.

On September 11, 2010, Bryan Masche was arrested at his father-in-law's home in Camp Verde, Arizona for resisting arrest, disorderly conduct, and threatening per domestic violence. On September 17, 2010, Jenny Masche filed for legal separation from husband Bryan in Yavapai County, Arizona. The couple were soon divorced. Jenny is remarried to Levi McClendon and they have two sons, Cash and Walker.

== Family ==
Parents

- Bryan John Masche
- Jennifer "Jenny" Lynn Simbric Masche

Sextuplets - born June 11, 2007 (age 19) in birth order:

- Savannah Jane Masche
- Bailey Elizabeth Masche
- Grant William Masche
- Cole Robert Masche
- Molli Grace Masche
- Blake Nickolas Masche

== Overview ==
Season	Episodes	Originally released	
Season	Episodes	First released	Last released
Special		June 18, 2008	
1	6	June 11, 2009	July 16, 2009
2	8	June 24, 2010	August 12, 2010

== Episode guide ==
=== Special (2008) ===
No. overall	No. in season	Title	Original release date
0	Sp.	"OMG! Sextuplets!"	June 18, 2008
This one-hour special introduces Jenny and Bryan Masche, who after a three-year struggle to conceive, find their wishes have multiplied when they receive news that they're expecting six babies.

=== Season 1 (2009) ===
No. overall	No. in season	Title	Original release date
1	1	"Surviving Six"	June 11, 2009
Bryan and Jenny Masche are learning that being first-time parents to sextuplets is harder than they thought. Everything that parents of singletons go through extends to the sixth power in their world. Just washing the family dog, Luke, turns into a major ordeal when half a dozen 16-months-olds get in on the action. And when mom and dad take the six out to a restaurant, all eyes are on them. Though Jenny gained 80 pounds during her pregnancy, she's lost it all through baby wrangling and training for a marathon. Unfortunately, Bryan's 30-plus pounds of sympathy weight won't go away, so Jenny signs him up for a weight-loss program! And life is stressful enough just raising sextuplets, but after 18 months off, family finances finally force Jenny to head back to work in the ER as a physician assistant. Now the juggling act kicks into high gear!
2	2	"Trees and Baby Bees"	June 18, 2009
When the Masches first bought their three-bedroom house, they never realized they would outgrow it so fast. But with sextuplets in the mix, the house is bursting at the seams! After Grandpa Bill offers the services of his construction company for the remodel, they find out Jenny's beloved big tree in the front yard is blocking the way of the addition. She's determined to somehow save it, but Bryan thinks she's crazy. In the midst of the remodeling chaos, Halloween comes and Jenny's determined to celebrate. But once again, she and Bryan don't see eye to eye-and costuming the six babies for trick-or-treating becomes a serious challenge.
3	3	"Making Over Mom"	June 25, 2009
Jenny may have lost her pregnancy weight, but having six babies has done a number on her body. After 18 months, she's ready to reverse the damage through plastic surgery. The problem is, between husband Bryan, her parents and her in-laws, everyone has an opinion about Jenny's plans to go under the knife. She decides to do it her way, but complications during surgery create unexpected anxiety. And after surgery, Jenny just wants to get back to the babies, which jeopardizes her recovery. Her mom, Sue, comes to the rescue, and the extended family all finally joins together for a true Thanksgiving!
4	4	"Christmas Chaos"	July 2, 2009
Christmas is hectic for any family, but it becomes downright crazy when you have sextuplets! There's never a dull moment during the family Christmas tree hunt, a Christmas card photo session and a Vegas shopping spree. The big gift for the family is a field trip to Williams, Arizona for a train ride on the Polar Express. The six Arizona desert babies see snow for the first time... with decidedly mixed reactions. But holiday cheer takes over when Santa shows up bearing gifts for all!
5	5	"Surfside Six"	July 9, 2009
As the babies get older and harder to wrangle, Bryan and Jenny have differing ideas about how they should experience the world. Bryan's the overprotective dad who wants the babies close by his side, while Jenny thinks each of the babies should be free to roam and learn through exploration. Their parenting styles clash on a family trip to Huntington Beach, California. But everyone roots for Jenny and her best friend Melaina when they compete in a half marathon!
6	6	"Water Babies"	July 16, 2009
Bryan and Jenny turn to the experts as their sextuplets head toward the terrible twos! Mom and dad get professional advice on disciplining six increasingly individual personalities. Swimming lessons become a family affair when each of the babies needs their own adult to join them in the pool. Meanwhile, Bryan heads to the diet doctor for his final weigh-in, and gets a big surprise. And Jenny comes face-to-face with the fact that her little ones won't stay that way forever when they start climbing out of their "baby table for six" and she has to admit they've outgrown it. Finally, a trip to a wildlife preserve shifts Bryan's protective-daddy impulses into high gear when the babies come face-to-face with a giraffe and a python!

=== Season 2 (2010) ===
No. overall	No. in season	Title	Original release date
7	1	"Turning Two, Times Six"	June 24, 2010
It's the sextuplets second birthday, and the family ventures to New York to celebrate. Also, Jenny and Bryan work on fixing their relationship and throw a party for the kids, where Bryan dresses up as a bear.
8	2	"We're Moving!"	July 1, 2010
Jenny and Bryan make the decision to move to Florida for Bryan's new job. However, their families are not so supportive of their choice. Also, the sextuplets start potty training and the entire Masche family enjoys a boat trip on Lake Havasu after an eventful trip to the dentists.
9	3	"10 is Enough"	July 8, 2010
The Masche family is moving in with Jenny's parents in order to rent out their house; Jenny and her children spend the night camping with her parents; Bryan and Jenny travel to Arizona where he takes the test that determines whether or not they move to Florida.
10	4	"Househunting Blues"	July 15, 2010
Jenny and Bryan disagree when searching for a home in Florida; a marriage counselor helps them highlight the trust issues in their relationship; the children are farm animals for Halloween; the Masche family says goodbye to their families.
11	5	"The Move"	July 22, 2010
The Masche family's relocation to Florida is hindered when the entire family falls ill the day before they're scheduled to depart; Jenny and Bryan fuss over furniture; car troubles befall the trip before the family arrives at the new home, minus the keys.
12	6	"Home Alone, Just the Eight of Us"	July 29, 2010
Now that Jenny and Bryan are on their own in Florida without their families, it's up to them to manage their parenting responsibilities.
13	7	"Working Mom and Mr. Mom"	August 5, 2010
With Bryan having to build his business from the ground up, Jenny has taken on the role of a working mom and start her new job at a local hospital, leaving Bryan to stay at home to take care of the kids.
14	8	"This Is Home Now"	August 12, 2010
The Masche family is having financial issues due to being supported by only one income, causing tension to rise. Also, Bryan and his dad bond together while they build a porch swing and Bryan's birthday is full of surprises.
