= 2008 in American television =

In American television in 2008, notable events included television show debuts, finales, cancellations, and new channel launches.

== Notable events ==
=== January ===
Date	Event
2	An interim agreement between Worldwide Pants Incorporated and the Writers Guild of America allows the Late Show with David Letterman and The Late Late Show with Craig Ferguson, both on CBS, to return with their full writing staffs, in spite of the ongoing WGA strike. By contrast, NBC's The Tonight Show with Jay Leno, Late Night with Conan O'Brien, and Last Call with Carson Daly and ABC's Jimmy Kimmel Live!, which are all produced by their respective networks, went back on the air without writers (except for Jay Leno, who writes his own material).
4	Jason Luna become the program's first (and only) $1,000,000 winner in the NBC's game show 1 vs. 100 during the program's second-season premiere titled Battle of the Sexes.
7	Due to the writers strike, it is announced that plans to hold the 65th Golden Globe Awards ceremony will be scrapped. A press conference that announced the winners is substituted for the program, and NBC, which would have broadcast the ceremony, airs Golden Globe-related programming in its place.

=== February ===
Date	Event
3	Fox's telecast of Super Bowl XLII surpasses Super Bowl XXX as the most-watched Super Bowl game on television (up to this point), and the most-watched program in the network's history. It also becomes the second most-watched television program trailing the 1983 M*A*S*H series finale and the highest-rated telecast in Nielsen ratings since Super Bowl XXXIV.
3	Animal Planet "relaunched" itself as part of a new branding campaign that "sheds its soft and furry side for programming and an image with more bite." As part of the relaunch, Animal Planet replaced its elephant and spinning globe logo for a starker text image that allows more flexibility in its usage.
8	The CW Television Network and the WWE announced that WWE Friday Night SmackDown would leave the CW primetime schedule at the end of the 2007–2008 season. The news stepped in after negotiations between the CW and WWE failed to reach a deal to keep the show on the CW lineup. Three weeks later on February 26, MyNetworkTV announced that they would pick up the program and would add it to its lineup in September.
9	Both the Writers Guild of America and Alliance of Motion Picture and Television Producers reach a tentative deal resolving the strike. Members vote three days later to end the strike.
17	The conversion of NTSC analog channels to digital channels using the ATSC system begins in the United States, with TV stations making last-minute filings and their intentions about when they will start their switchover ahead of the February 17, 2009, mandatory date. Also, the US government starts mailing out (USD)$40.00 coupons/rebates to consumers to use in buying DTV converters before the switchover.
17	In a two-hour television film, Knight Rider returned to NBC with a new KITT being portrayed as a black 2008 Ford Shelby GT500KR Mustang and voiced by actor Val Kilmer.
22	Adam Rose become the first $1,000,000 winner in Drew Carey's first primetime episode of The Price is Right on CBS. At $1,153,908 cash & prizes won, Rose surpassed Joanne Segeviano's winnings of A$664,667 (about $406,274.45; or $475,593 by Inflation as of 2026) from the Australian version as the franchise's largest winnings record in the show's history. Until James Holzhauer's Jeopardy! appearance in 2019, Rose was placed in the top ten largest game show winners in history until April 24, 2019 (Holzhauer's total game show career winnings at the time after the episode was $1,193,508.33 (including J!'s career winnings of $1,135,175; Holzhauer's final winnings were $2,464,216 after his defeat on his 33rd game on June 3, and $3,022,549 as of Jeopardy! The Greatest of All Time tournament, the latter currently was placed third in the top ten list)).
24	ABC's telecast of the 80th Academy Awards draws record-low ratings in the history of the ceremony's telecast surpassing the ratings from the ceremony that took place in 2003. 31.76 million on average watched the show over its entire run with a Nielsen rating of 18.66 households watching.
25	Fox News Channel rebrands its Fox News Live and Weekend Live telecasts as America's Election Headquarters, a news program related to the 2008 presidential election. The weekday edition replaces The Big Story in the 5 p.m. timeslot. The Fox News Live name would still be used for headline segments through November.
29	CBS's soap opera Guiding Light unveils a new opening for the town of Peapack-Gladstone, New Jersey, while still filming in New York City, New York.

=== March ===
Date	Event
7	Michael Hanes, a former contestant on Press Your Luck, wins $1,127,062 on a prime-time episode of The Price is Right on CBS.
15	Laurie Dhue, anchor of Fox Report Weekend, leaves Fox News Channel after opting not to renew her contract. She is replaced by Julie Banderas, co-anchor of America's Election Headquarters on weekends.
20	The History Channel shortened its name to simply History.
27	WNBC/New York City, NBC's flagship station, scraps a scheduled airing of Access Hollywood in favor of an infomercial for Lend America. Station GM Frank Comerford resigned in the wake of the controversy and the station management apologized a day after the incident. 6 days after the incident, the station restored the "4 New York" branding for non-news programming and News 4 New York for news programming.

=== April ===
Date	Event
4	In CBS, Cynthia Azevedo became the third and final $1,000,000 winner (the only winner who won the $1,000,000 bonus from a pricing game) on a prime-time episode of The Price is Right with a total winning of $1,089,017. Another contestant from the same episode won an $87,910 Dodge Viper on Golden Road, and this was the game's last win until December 23, 2014. Price would later cancel the $1,000,000 spectacular on May 7 due to budget.
7	Bill Self's Kansas Jayhawks defeat John Calipari's Memphis Tigers 75–68 at the 2008 NCAA Men's Division I Basketball Championship Game at the Alamodome in San Antonio, Texas, and celebrate their victory in front of a national television audience on CBS.
17	Former American Idol contestant Kimberley Locke became the first contestant in history to attempt, but unsuccessfully, the final level ($1,000,000 song; Ringo Starr's You're Sixteen) in the game show Don't Forget the Lyrics! and left with $100,000 that was raised for Camp Heartland. Locke, however, announced after the game that she would raise the $400,000 that she risked earlier along with the help of host Wayne Brady.
28	The WB Television Network, relaunches as an online website only.

=== May ===
Date	Event
11	On CBS, former model Parvati Shallow was announced the winner of Survivor: Micronesia. It was also announced that the next season will be filmed in high definition.
11	The ABC drama series Brothers & Sisters airs its second season finale, which depicts the wedding of Kevin Walker and Scotty Wandell. Although it is the ninth same-sex wedding ceremony to be portrayed on American network television, it is the first same-sex wedding of series regulars on an American television series.
16	The Wilmington, North Carolina television market is selected by the FCC to be the first television market in the United States to sign off their analog channels for ATSC early, starting September 8.
21	David Cook became the seventh winner of American Idol.
24	After over thirteen years, Kids' WB, The CW's children's programming block, ceases airing and becomes The CW4Kids when the network sells the air time to 4Kids Entertainment. Kids' WB, like The WB that the block originated, then relaunches as an online-only video on demand service.
24	Superstation WGN changed its name to WGN America (initially, the use of the new name was limited to on-air promotions, as the Superstation WGN channel IDs remained in place). The new WGN America name and logo went into full-time use on May 26, 2008. The new logo was also the first used by the superstation feed to not incorporate WGN-TV's on-air logo branding in some capacity (the "WGN" text was similar in resemblance, although the "G" was not formed into an ovular arrow as it is in WGN-TV's logo), and its design featured the eyes of a female, which was used alongside the new slogan "TV You Can't Ignore".

=== June ===
Date	Event
1	A large fire damages portions of Universal Studios Hollywood near Los Angeles, south of Burbank where NBC's soap opera Days of Our Lives is filmed.
17	Game 6 of the NBA Finals is broadcast on ABC. The Boston Celtics won their 17th world championship, and first since 1986, against the longtime rivals Los Angeles Lakers. Paul Pierce was awarded the Finals MVP. A memorable post-game interview had a very emotional Kevin Garnett claiming out loud that "anything is possible".
19	Big Ten Network and Comcast announced a carriage agreement deal. The channel was added to Comcast on August 15.
28	The first episode of Saturday Night Live is rerun on NBC following the death of first host George Carlin, who died six days earlier on June 22.

=== July ===
Date	Event
7	The Jewelry Channel, an American home shopping service that was shown mostly on DirecTV and Dish Network, launches a going-out-of-business sale for its remaining items that was shown on the channel that would last until December 1. From December 1 onwards, TJC does business as The Liquidation Channel.
21	MGM Television and Weigel Broadcasting announce the launching of a new broadcast network designed for digital subchannels in the United States called This TV.
21	Film critic Richard Roeper announces that he will be leaving the syndicated movie review show At the Movies with Ebert & Roeper after he and Disney-ABC Domestic Television did not reach an agreement on a new contract, with his last show airing the weekend of August 16. Roger Ebert (who had been sidelined from the program for two years due to various cancer surgeries) announced that he would also be no longer be associated with the program after Disney had decided to take the show in a different direction. The following day, Disney announced that E! Entertainment's Ben Lyons and Turner Classic Movies' Ben Mankiewicz would take over as the new hosts of the newly-titled At the Movies beginning the week of September 6–7.

=== August ===
Date	Event
1	Bowing to concerns by the Fox network over its Mexican-based operations, XETV, its affiliate in San Diego licensed to Tijuana, Mexico, swaps affiliations with CW affiliate KSWB-TV.
6	Disney-ABC Television Group announced they would close Toon Disney in early 2009 and replace it with Disney XD, which would be aimed at kids from ages 6 and up.
7	The Florence/Myrtle Beach, South Carolina television market gets its first-ever NBC affiliate, WMBF-TV. This move also gives Florence/Myrtle Beach in-market affiliates of all four major commercial networks.
8	After 50 years of being served by WTAE-TV/Pittsburgh, Pennsylvania, the Wheeling-Steubenville and Clarksburg-Fairmont TV markets get their first full-time ABC affiliates (as well as in-market affiliates of all four major commercial networks), as CBS affiliate WTRF/Wheeling, West Virginia adds an ABC affiliate on its DT3 subchannel and sister station & NBC affiliate WBOY-TV/Clarksburg, West Virginia does the same on its DT2 subchannel. Both stations had been ABC secondary affiliates in the past.
11	Sesame Street is broadcast in HD for the first time.
28	ESPNU launches its HD version to only five American cable television or satellite carriers.
29	After 10 years on the air, PBS pulls Teletubbies off the PBS Kids block.
31	Big Ten Network reached carriage deal agreements with Time Warner Cable, Charter Communications, Brighthouse Networks, Mediacom and Cox Communications, ending the "cable carriage controversies" that the network had in its first year of existence. The network is now on all major cable TV systems in The Big Ten Region.

=== September ===
Date	Event
1	PBS Kids receives new on-air branding produced by Primal Screen; Primal Screen had produced promotional elements for PBS Kids since 2000.
1	Jessica Robinson become the program's first (of two) $1,000,000 winner in NBC's Deal or No Deal during the Million Dollar Mission special. Nearly two months later on October 29, Winnow "Tomorrow" Rodriquez became the second $1,000,000 winner after Rodriquez opened the last non-million briefcase before the final deal.
4	Stand Up to Cancer, an event designed to raise cancer awareness, airs on ABC, CBS, NBC and E! in the United States, and on CTV, Citytv and Global in Canada.
4	Then-Georgian superintendent Kathy Cox became the program's first (of two) $1,000,000 winner in FOX's game show Are You Smarter than a 5th Grader?.
8	The Wilmington, North Carolina television market officially becomes the first TV market in the United States to have all of its stations broadcast exclusively in digital, using the ATSC system.
8	The 26th season of Wheel of Fortune premiered with a new wedge introduced from the Australian version where contestants acquiring said wedge can win up to $1,000,000 in the bonus round, replacing with the usual $100,000 top prize. Its first such bonus round did not occur until October 3, and was not won until the October 14 episode. The first top prize loss happened on April 2, 2015.
15	WTMJ-TV/Milwaukee drops almost all syndicated programming except for Better and weekend niche programs in late night, featuring a lineup that consists of local news (including a four-hour afternoon news block from 3 to 7 pm, a first in the United States Central Time Zone) and NBC programming.
20	Cartoon Network's action-adventure block Toonami ends after 11 years; it would return to Adult Swim three and a half years later.
21	The 60th Primetime Emmy Awards broadcasts on ABC.
26	Programming block Ready Set Learn! ends on TLC. Reruns of TLC children's programming continues to air on Discovery Kids, which would rebrand as The Hub two years later.
26	Senators McCain and Obama participate in the first of three presidential debates with Jim Lehrer moderating.

=== October ===
Date	Event
2	Gwen Ifill moderates the vice presidential debate between Sarah Palin and Joe Biden which ends up being the most watched vice presidential debate of all time.
7	NBC announces that NBC Weather Plus would sign off at the end of the year.
7	McCain and Obama participate in the second presidential debate at Belmont University with Tom Brokaw moderating.
10	Jeopardy! veteran Ken Jennings won $500,000 in the FOX's game show Are You Smarter than a 5th Grader? though he chose not to risk his $475,000 winnings to attempt the $1,000,000 question (in which he answered correctly); with the total winnings accounted to $3,623,414.29, Jennings, for the first time since 2005, surpassed Brad Rutter's (another Jeopardy! veteran and then-current All-time champion) record of $3,455,102 as the biggest game show winner in the history of American and international television, a record which he would hold till this day (Jennings' record was surpassed by Rutter between May 16, 2014, after the finals of Jeopardy! Battle of the Decades until January 14, 2020, on Jeopardy! The Greatest of All Time).
14	Michelle Lowenstein became the first $1,000,000 winner in the game show Wheel of Fortune. At $1,026,080 in cash & prizes won, Lowenstein surpassed Peter Argyropolous and Deborah Cohen's all-time winnings record of $146,529 back in February 1996, and Christine Denos and Jack Wagner's single-day record of $142,550 on February 28, 2006, to become the largest single-day winner in the show's history until on May 30, 2013, where another contestant Autumn Erhard (who won $1,030,340) surpassed Lowenstein's total.
15	Bob Schieffer of CBS News moderates the final presidential debate between senators John McCain and Barack Obama.
17	United States Congresswoman Michele Bachmann (R-Minnesota 6th) makes headlines when she asks for an investigation into whether members of the United States Congress are anti-American during a live interview on MSNBC's Hardball with Chris Matthews.
20	CBS announces it has signed an affiliation deal with ABC affiliate WENY-TV in Elmira, New York, giving the Elmira-Corning market both its first locally based CBS affiliate and in-market affiliates of all four major commercial networks. The affiliation takes effect on cable on February 17, 2009 (when WENY-TV requests a flash-cut from analog to digital broadcasting), and over-the-air on WENY-DT2 at the end of May (when WENY-TV performs its flash-cut).
24	Barack Obama airs a 30-minute infomercial that airs on CBS, NBC, Fox, BET, Univision, MSNBC and TV One. The infomercial is seen by 33.6 million viewers.
25	K07YM in Bend, Oregon, a translator of CBS affiliate KOIN in Portland, Oregon, is converted to a stand-alone station as KBNZ-LD, giving the Bend market both its first-ever CBS affiliate and in-market affiliates of all four major commercial networks.
29	Game 5 of the World Series is broadcast on Fox. The Philadelphia Phillies defeat the Tampa Bay Rays. It was the team's first title since 1980 and second in franchise history. This marked the end of the Curse of Billy Penn.

=== November ===
Date	Event
4	CNN becomes the first channel in history to use hologram technology on television, during the 2008 United States Presidential Election. CNN's Jessica Yellin became the first person to be transmitted via hologram, followed by Will.i.am of The Black Eyed Peas.
5	At the end of the 2008 presidential election, Fox News Channel rebrands America's Election Headquarters as America's News Headquarters; the headline segments also use that name.
17	Kathy Cox, who earlier appeared in Are You Smarter than a 5th Grader? as the first $1,000,000 winner on September 4, along with his husband, declared Chapter 7 Bankruptcy because of a $3.5 million debt that came from the failure of her husband's home construction business. Fidelity Investments, who's responsible for charging a fund for the donor schools, donated the winnings back to Fox in December 2008 from the schools and placed the $1,000,000 prize won in a limbo that would not benefit anyone.
19	Flint, Michigan PBS member station WFUM-TV (a.k.a. Michigan Television) permanently turns off its analog signal and begins broadcasting exclusively in digital, 9 months before the federally mandated analog shut off date of June 12, 2009, becoming the first station in its market, as well as the first PBS station in Michigan, to do so.
20	The CW announces that it has terminated its Sunday night deal with Media Rights Capital. At the end of the season, the network returns its Sunday night programming time to its local affiliates.
29	To settle a court dispute between itself and rival NBC affiliate WLIO, Metro Video Productions, owners of three low-power stations in Lima, Ohio (Fox/MyNetworkTV affiliate WOHL-CA, CBS affiliate WLMO-LP, and ABC affiliate WLQP-LP), sells all three stations to West Central Ohio Broadcasting, a division of Block Communications (parent company of WLIO). The dispute stems from Fox's plans in late 2007 to leave WOHL-CA and enter into talks to join a digital subchannel of full-power WLIO, despite WOHL-CA outrating WLIO in primetime. The sale is finalized on February 5, 2009.

=== December ===
Date	Event
1	WBQC-CA/Cincinnati, Ohio asks the FCC permission to change its callsign to WKRP in honor of the television series that was set in the city.
3	The 2008 Victoria's Secret Fashion Show is broadcast on CBS. 8.7 million people tune in.
4	For the first time ever, a live music special is used to announce the nominees for the 51st Grammy Awards. As usual for the Grammies, the special is broadcast by CBS.
7	In CBS, siblings Nicholas "Nick" Spangler and Emily "Starr" Spangler won the thirteenth season of the five-time Primetime Emmy Award-winning reality show The Amazing Race, with a record of becoming the youngest winning team in the show's history, and a record seven legs won in one season (which would later tie with the winners of the fifteenth season nearly a year later) until the twentieth season, where it was first surpassed by winners Rachel & Dave Brown Jr. with eight legs in May 2012 (tying Rovilson Fernanzes & Marc Nelson's record of eight legs from The Amazing Race Asia 2 in last year, and Tom & Tyler later on The Amazing Race Australia 4 in November 2019).
8	HD versions of Comcast's cable channels The Style Network, E! Entertainment Television and G4 launch. Golf Channel and Versus also break apart from their combined HD network to full simulcasts of their regular schedule on separate HD networks.
8	The Tribune Company, owners of WGN-TV/Chicago and KTLA/Los Angeles, among other properties, files for chapter 11 bankruptcy protection.
16	Contestant Terry Kniess became the first contestant to achieve a perfect showcase bid on The Price Is Right by guessing the exact price ($23,743) of the showcase he was offered, amid allegations of cheating.
27	After over eighteen years, Fox drops children's programming. Its final children's programming block, 4Kids TV, goes off the air, and 4Kids Entertainment directs its programming to The CW4Kids, the block it programs for The CW. 4Kids TV would later launch as an online-only website on the same day.
29	After four years, Adult Swim adds an hour to its operating day (the block, which used to begin at 11:00 p.m., now starts at 10:00 p.m. and runs to 6:00 a.m.)
31	Time Warner Cable and Bright House Networks announce they would no longer carry Viacom channels unless they form a new agreement with Viacom. They reach a new agreement right as the previous one would have expired.

== Programs ==
=== Debuts ===
The following is a list of shows that premiered in 2008.

Date	Show	Network
January 3	The Celebrity Apprentice	NBC
January 6	Biz Kids	PBS Kids GO!
January 8	How Much Is Enough?	GSN
January 8	Street Patrol	MyNetworkTV
January 9	Ghost Hunters International	Sci-Fi Channel
January 12	Betsy's Kindergarten Adventures	PBS Kids
January 13	Terminator: The Sarah Connor Chronicles	Fox
January 19	Panwapa	PBS Kids Sprout
January 20	Breaking Bad	AMC
January 21	Life After People	History
January 23	The Moment of Truth	Fox
January 23	Hollywood Residential	Starz
January 25	Gone Country	CMT
January 26	America's Best Dance Crew	MTV
January 28	In Treatment	HBO
January 31	Eli Stone	ABC
February 4	The Mr. Men Show	Cartoon Network
February 4	Welcome to The Captain	CBS
February 7	Lipstick Jungle	NBC
February 7	Ni Hao, Kai-lan	Nick Jr.
February 8	Escape to Chimp Eden	Animal Planet
February 24	Bakugan Battle Brawlers	Cartoon Network
March 2	Unhitched	Fox
March 4	New Amsterdam	Fox
March 6	Crime 360	A&E
March 8	The Spectacular Spider-Man	Kids' WB
March 10	Canterbury's Law	Fox
March 13	World's Dumbest...	truTV
March 14	The Return of Jezebel James	Fox
March 16	John Adams	HBO
March 18	Miss Guided	ABC
March 30	Tracey Ullman's State of the Union	Showtime
April 1	Delocated	Adult Swim
April 2	DEA	Spike
April 3	Rock the Cradle	MTV
April 7	Andrea Mitchell Reports	MSNBC
April 8	Secret Talents of the Stars	CBS
April 12	Groomer Has It	Animal Planet
April 14	The Paper	MTV
April 14	Can You Duet	CMT
April 16	Under One Roof	MyNetworkTV
April 18	Ben 10: Alien Force	Cartoon Network
April 22	A Shot at Love II with Tila Tequila	MTV
April 22	The Big Green Help	Nickelodeon
April 26	The Mighty B!	Nickelodeon
April 26	Farmer Wants a Wife	The CW
May 2	Speed Racer: The Next Generation	Nicktoons
May 14	1000 Ways to Die	Spike
May 26	Denise Richards: It's Complicated	E!
May 26	Living Lohan	E!
June 1	Million Dollar Password	CBS
June 3	Chasing Classic Cars	Motor Trend
June 5	Swingtown	CBS
June 5	The Marvelous Misadventures of Flapjack	Cartoon Network
June 11	Celebrity Circus	NBC
June 15	Surviving History	History
June 15	Greensburg	Planet Green
June 16	Psychic Kids	A&E
June 21	Can You Teach My Alligator Manners?	Playhouse Disney
June 24	I Survived a Japanese Game Show	ABC
June 24	Wipeout	ABC
June 24	Atom TV	Comedy Central
June 27	Dance Machine	ABC
June 27	Three Delivery	Nicktoons
July 1	The Secret Life of the American Teenager	ABC Family
July 6	I Love Money	VH1
July 9	Click and Clack's As the Wrench Turns	PBS
July 10	Greatest American Dog	CBS
July 11	Flashpoint	CBS
July 11	Queen Bees	The N
July 13	Generation Kill	HBO
July 14	The Wendy Williams Show	Syndication
July 15	Must Love Kids	TLC
July 16	Family Foreman	TV Land
July 21	Wanna Bet?	ABC
July 21	Rome: Rise and Fall of an Empire	History
July 22	Highway 18	Golf Channel
July 23	Buzzin'	MTV
July 29	Jurassic Fight Club	History
August 3	Pam: Girl on the Loose!	E!
August 4	New York Goes to Hollywood	VH1
August 15	Outsiders Inn	CMT
August 18	Gemini Division	NBC
August 21	The Principal's Office	truTV
August 24	Z Rock	IFC
September 1	Raising the Bar	TNT
September 1	Martha Speaks	PBS Kids
September 1	Sid the Science Kid	PBS Kids
September 2	90210	The CW
September 3	Sons of Anarchy	FX
September 6	Imagination Movers	Playhouse Disney
September 7	Hole in the Wall	Fox
September 7	True Blood	HBO
September 7	Wunderkind Little Amadeus	Syndication
September 8	The Bonnie Hunt Show	Syndication
September 8	The Doctors	Syndication
September 8	The Rachel Maddow Show	MSNBC
September 9	Privileged	The CW
September 9	Fringe	Fox
September 10	Do Not Disturb	Fox
September 15	My Family's Got Guts	Nickelodeon
September 22	Worst Week	CBS
September 22	Judge Jeanine Pirro	Syndication
September 23	Family Court with Judge Penny	Syndication
September 23	Opportunity Knocks	ABC
September 23	The Mentalist	CBS
September 24	Gary Unmarried	CBS
September 26	The Suite Life on Deck	Disney Channel
September 27	GoGoRiki	The CW4Kids on The CW
September 28	Little Britain USA	HBO
September 30	Paris Hilton's My New BFF	MTV
October 3	The Ex List	CBS
October 3	The Secret Saturdays	Cartoon Network
October 3	Star Wars: The Clone Wars	Cartoon Network
October 3	You Are Here	Cartoon Network
October 4	1st Look	NBC
October 4	Making Fiends	Nicktoons
October 5	Easy Money	The CW
October 5	In Harm's Way	The CW
October 5	Valentine	The CW
October 6	Lomax, the Hound of Music	PBS Kids
October 6	Worldfocus	PBS
October 7	The Real Housewives of Atlanta	Bravo
October 8	The Tony Rock Project	MyNetworkTV
October 8	Modelville	Syndication
October 9	Eleventh Hour	CBS
October 9	Kath & Kim	NBC
October 9	Saturday Night Live Weekend Update Thursday	NBC
October 9	Life on Mars	ABC
October 9	Testees	FX
October 10	The Starter Wife	USA
October 11	Dogs 101	Animal Planet
October 11	Zane's Sex Chronicles	Cinemax
October 13	My Own Worst Enemy	NBC
October 13	Unsolved Mysteries	Spike
October 13	Solved	Investigation Discovery
October 15	Chocolate News	Comedy Central
October 17	Crash	Starz
October 17	Crusoe	NBC
October 17	Ghost Adventures	Travel Channel
October 17	Jane Velez-Mitchell	HLN
October 18	Giada at Home	Food Network
October 18	Hulk Hogan's Celebrity Championship Wrestling	CMT
October 20	Rita Rocks	Lifetime
October 20	Real Chance of Love	VH1
October 20	Scream Queens	VH1
October 22	Stylista	The CW
October 25	D. L. Hughley Breaks the News	CNN
October 27	Cars Toons	Disney Channel
October 30	Lost Tapes	Animal Planet
November 1	Legend of the Seeker	Syndication
November 2	Pajanimals	PBS Kids Sprout
November 5	America's News Headquarters	Fox News Channel
November 12	Estate of Panic	Sci-Fi Channel
November 8	True Jackson, VP	Nickelodeon
November 8	Tasty Time with ZeFronk	Playhouse Disney
November 14	Batman: The Brave and the Bold	Cartoon Network
November 28	The Penguins of Madagascar	Nickelodeon
December 3	Man v. Food	Travel Channel
December 6	Random! Cartoons	Nicktoons
December 7	Leverage	TNT
December 9	A Double Shot at Love	MTV
December 10	World's Wildest Vacation Videos	TruTV
December 16	Momma's Boys	NBC
December 29	Bromance	MTV
December 29	The City	MTV

=== Entering syndication this year ===
Show	Seasons	In production	Source
Bones	3	Yes	Cable syndication on TNT
Boston Legal	4	No	
CSI: NY	4	Yes	
Desperate Housewives	4	Yes	
Tyler Perry's House of Payne	5	Yes	
Monk	6	Yes	
My Name is Earl	3	Yes	Cable syndication on TBS
Punk'd	8	No	
Storm Stories	7	Yes	
Wife Swap	4	Yes	Cable syndication on Lifetime

=== Changes of network affiliation ===
Show	Moved from	Moved to
The Zula Patrol	PBS Kids	Qubo
Franny's Feet	PBS Kids	PBS Kids Sprout
1st and 10	ESPN	ESPN2
The Contender	ESPN	Versus
Emeril Live	Food Network	Fine Living
Friday Night Lights	NBC	The 101 Network
High School Reunion	The WB	TV Land
Inside the NFL	HBO	Showtime
The Whitest Kids U' Know	Fuse	IFC
Jon & Kate Plus 8	Discovery Health Channel	TLC
Nashville Star	USA	NBC
Futurama	Fox, TBS, and Adult Swim	Comedy Central
Paradise Hotel	Fox	MyNetworkTV
WWE Friday Night SmackDown	The CW	MyNetworkTV
World Poker Tour	Travel Channel and GSN	GSN and Fox Sports Net
Teenage Mutant Ninja Turtles	4KidsTV	The CW4Kids
Viva Piñata	4KidsTV	The CW4Kids
The Spectacular Spider-Man	Kids' WB	The CW4Kids
Johnny Test	Kids' WB	Cartoon Network
Skunk Fu!	Kids' WB	Cartoon Network
Legion of Super Heroes	Kids' WB	Cartoon Network
Shaggy & Scooby-Doo Get a Clue!	Kids' WB	Cartoon Network
Tom and Jerry Tales	Kids' WB	Cartoon Network
Unsolved Mysteries	Lifetime	Spike
Mr. Meaty	Nickelodeon	Nicktoons
My Life as a Teenage Robot	Nickelodeon	Nicktoons

=== Returning this year ===
Show	Previous network	Last aired	New Title	New network	Returning
Paradise Hotel	Fox	2003	Same	MyNetworkTV	February 4
Bratz	4Kids TV	2005	Same	Nicktoons	February 4
My Life as a Teenage Robot	Nickelodeon	2005	Same	Nicktoons	October 4
Futurama	Fox	2003	Same	Comedy Central	March 23
The Bachelorette	ABC	2005	Same	Same	May 19
The Mole	ABC	2004	Same	Same	June 2
ChalkZone	Nickelodeon	2005	Same	Same	August 23
The Batman	Kids WB	2008	Batman: The Brave and the Bold	Cartoon Network	November 14
Knight Rider	NBC	1986	Same	Same	September 24

=== Ending this year ===
Date	Show	Channel	Debut	Status
January 6	I Love New York	VH1	2007	Cancelled
January 7	Higglytown Heroes	Playhouse Disney	2004	Cancelled
January 15	SeeMore's Playhouse	PBS Kids	2006	Cancelled
January 18	Game Head	Cartoon Network	2005	Cancelled
January 21	Codename: Kids Next Door	Cartoon Network	2002	Cancelled
January 23	The Land Before Time	Cartoon Network	2007	Cancelled
January 23	Power of 10	CBS	2007	Cancelled
January 24	Big Shots	ABC	2007	Cancelled
January 30	Crowned: The Mother of All Pageants	The CW	2007	Cancelled
February 1	Star Jones	truTV	2007	Cancelled
February 3	Life Is Wild	Animal Planet	2007	Cancelled
February 4	Animal Precinct	Animal Planet	2001	Cancelled
February 8	Flash Gordon	Sci-Fi	2007	Cancelled
February 11	Notes from the Underbelly	ABC	2007	Cancelled
February 11	Girlfriends	The CW	2000	Cancelled
February 15	Las Vegas	NBC	2003	Cancelled
February 20	Cashmere Mafia	ABC	2008	Cancelled
February 22	1 vs. 100 (returned in 2010)	NBC	2006	Cancelled
February 22	The Big Story	Syndication	2001	Cancelled
February 24	CW Now	The CW	2007	Cancelled
February 24	Fox News Live (returned in 2021)	Fox News Channel	1999	Cancelled
February 24	Weekend Live	Fox News Channel	2002	Cancelled
February 26	Bratz	Fox	2005	Cancelled
February 29	About a Girl	Noggin	2007	Cancelled
March 3	Welcome to The Captain	CBS	2007	Cancelled
March 8	The Batman	Kids' WB	2004	Cancelled
March 9	My Fair Brady	VH1	2005	Cancelled
March 9	Quarterlife	NBC/Bravo	2008	Cancelled
March 9	The Wire	HBO	2002	Ended
March 10	October Road	ABC	2007	Cancelled
March 12	Hollywood Residential	Starz	2008	Cancelled
March 14	Tucker	MSNBC	2005	Cancelled
March 15	Shaggy & Scooby-Doo Get a Clue!	Kids' WB	2006	Cancelled
March 15	Control Room Presents	MyNetworkTV	2007	Cancelled
March 21	Wilbur	Discovery Kids	2007	Cancelled
March 21	The Return of Jezebel James	Fox	2008	Cancelled
March 22	Tom and Jerry Tales	Kids' WB	2006	Cancelled
March 23	Frisky Dingo	Adult Swim	2006	Cancelled
March 24	The Salt-N-Pepa Show	VH1	2007	Cancelled
March 25	Jericho	CBS	2006	Cancelled
March 27	Camp Lazlo	Cartoon Network	2005	Cancelled
March 28	In the Loop with iVillage	IVillage	2006	Cancelled
March 29	How Much Is Enough?	GSN	2008	Cancelled
March 30	Unhitched	Fox	2008	Cancelled
April 3	Miss Guided	ABC	2008	Cancelled
April 5	Legion of Super Heroes	Kids' WB	2006	Cancelled
April 7	My Dad Is Better Than Your Dad	NBC	2008	Cancelled
April 8	Secret Talents of the Stars	CBS	2008	Cancelled
April 11	Amnesia	NBC	2008	Cancelled
April 13	Dirt	FX	2007	Cancelled
April 14	New Amsterdam	Fox	2008	Cancelled
April 15	Ben 10	Cartoon Network	2005	Cancelled
April 15	Rob & Big	MTV	2006	Cancelled
April 16	Human Giant	MTV	2007	Cancelled
April 17	Atomic Betty	Cartoon Network	2004	Cancelled
April 18	Canterbury's Law	Fox	2008	Cancelled
April 20	Oprah's Big Give	ABC	2008	Cancelled
April 23	Pussycat Dolls Present	The CW	2007	Cancelled
April 27	John Adams	HBO	2008	Cancelled
April 28	High School Confidential	We TV	2008	Cancelled
April 29	The Riches	FX	2007	Cancelled
May 2	Zoey 101	Nickelodeon	2005	Cancelled
May 8	Rock the Cradle	MTV	2008	Cancelled
May 9	Merv Griffin's Crosswords	Syndication	2007	Cancelled
May 13	Beauty and the Geek	The CW	2005	Cancelled
May 13	Women's Murder Club	ABC	2007	Cancelled
May 14	Back to You	Fox	2007	Cancelled
May 15	Lil' Bush	MTV	2007	Cancelled
May 16	Moonlight	CBS	2007	Cancelled
May 16	The Montel Williams Show	Syndication	1991	Cancelled
May 18	Aliens in America	The CW	2007	Cancelled
May 19	Paradise Hotel (returned in 2019)	MyNetworkTV	2003	Cancelled
May 20	Shark	CBS	2006	Cancelled
May 23	Judge Hatchett	Syndication	2000	Cancelled
May 23	Temptation	Syndication	2007	Cancelled
May 23	Judge Maria Lopez	Syndication	2006	Cancelled
May 24	Showtime at the Apollo (returned in 2018)	Syndication	1987	Cancelled
May 25	Class of 3000	Cartoon Network	2006	Cancelled
May 26	Flavor of Love	VH1	2006	Cancelled
May 26	Wildfire	ABC Family	2005	Cancelled
May 29	Out of Jimmy's Head	Cartoon Network	2007	Cancelled
May 30	WWE Heat	WWE	1998	Cancelled
May 31	Space Ghost Coast to Coast	Cartoon Network	1994	Cancelled
June 10	ToddWorld	Discovery Kids	2004	Cancelled
June 10	Work Out	Bravo	2006	Cancelled
June 11	Men in Trees	ABC	2006	Cancelled
June 13	America's Pulse with E.D. Hill	Syndication	2007	Cancelled
June 14	World of Quest	Kids' WB	2008	Cancelled
June 18	The Zula Patrol	PBS Kids	2005	Cancelled
June 21	Growing Up Creepie	Discovery Kids	2006	Cancelled
June 25	Farmer Wants a Wife (returned in 2023)	The CW	2008	Cancelled
June 26	I Love the New Millennium	VH1	2008	Cancelled
June 28	Endurance	Discovery Kids	2002	Cancelled
July 1	Signing Time!	Syndication	2002	Cancelled
July 4	Just In	Fox News Channel	2008	Cancelled
July 5	The Future Is Wild	Discovery Kids	2007	Cancelled
July 6	Assy McGee	Adult Swim	2006	Cancelled
July 11	Dance Machine	ABC	2008	Cancelled
July 16	Celebrity Circus	NBC	2008	Cancelled
July 19	Avatar: The Last Airbender	Nickelodeon	2005	Cancelled
July 23	Mind of Mencia	Comedy Central	2005	Cancelled
July 25	Duel	ABC	2007	Cancelled
July 27	Living Lohan	E!	2008	Cancelled
July 29	Celebrity Family Feud (returned in 2015)	NBC	2008	Cancelled
August 4	American Gladiators	NBC	2008	Cancelled
August 7	Passions	The 101 Network	1999	Cancelled
August 11	The Mole	ABC	2001	Cancelled
August 13	Click and Clack's As the Wrench Turns	PBS	2008	Cancelled
August 17	All Grown Up!	Nickelodeon	2003	Cancelled
August 17	Shootout	AMC	2003	Cancelled
August 17	Code Monkeys	G4	2007	Cancelled
August 17	Fat Guy Stuck in Internet	Adult Swim	2007	Cancelled
August 20	Family Foreman	TV Land	2008	Cancelled
August 23	Just Jordan	Nickelodeon	2007	Cancelled
August 23	ChalkZone	Nickelodeon	2002	Cancelled
August 24	Generation Kill	HBO	2008	Cancelled
August 29	Queen Bees	The N	2008	Cancelled
August 30	Disney Channel Games	Disney Channel	2006	Cancelled
August 31	Boohbah	PBS Kids	2004	Cancelled
September 1	The Suite Life of Zack & Cody	Disney Channel	2005	Cancelled
September 5	Swingtown	CBS	2008	Cancelled
September 5	Northwest Afternoon	KOMO-TV	1984	Cancelled
September 10	Greatest American Dog	CBS	2008	Cancelled
September 12	Cory in the House	Disney Channel	2007	Cancelled
September 13	El Tigre: The Adventures of Manny Rivera	Nickelodeon	2007	Cancelled
September 13	The Planet's Funniest Animals	Animal Planet	1999	Cancelled
September 18	Wayside	Nickelodeon	2007	Cancelled
September 20	Kappa Mikey	Nicktoons	2006	Cancelled
September 20	Must Love Kids	TLC	2008	Cancelled
September 20	E!'s Pam: Girl on the Loose!	E!	2008	Cancelled
September 24	Do Not Disturb	Fox	2008	Cancelled
September 26	Fried Dynamite	Cartoon Network	2007	Cancelled
September 27	My Family's Got Guts	Nickelodeon	2008	Cancelled
September 27	Betsy's Kindergarten Adventures	PBS Kids	2008	Cancelled
September 30	Highway 18	Golf Channel	2008	Cancelled
October 2	MTV's Top Pop Group	MTV	2008	Cancelled
October 3	Outsiders Inn	CMT	2008	Cancelled
October 11	Tutenstein	Discovery Kids	2003	Cancelled
October 14	Opportunity Knocks	ABC	2008	Cancelled
October 21	General Hospital: Night Shift	Soapnet	2007	Cancelled
October 22	Jurassic Fight Club	History	2008	Cancelled
October 24	The Ex List	CBS	2008	Cancelled
October 25	America's Toughest Jobs	NBC	2008	Cancelled
October 25	Bindi the Jungle Girl	Discovery Kids	2007	Cancelled
October 26	In Harm's Way	The CW	2008	Cancelled
October 30	Edgar & Ellen	Nicktoons	2007	Cancelled
November 1	Making Fiends	Nicktoons	2008	Cancelled
November 3	Power Rangers Jungle Fury	Jetix and Toon Disney	2008	Cancelled
November 8	Rap City	BET	1989	Cancelled
November 13	3-2-1 Penguins!	Qubo	2006	Cancelled
November 16	Total Request Live (returned in 2017)	MTV	1998	Cancelled
November 17	Estate of Panic	Sci-Fi	2008	Cancelled
November 20	The Emperor's New School	Disney Channel	2006	Cancelled
November 20	Tim Gunn's Guide to Style	Bravo	2007	Cancelled
November 25	The Shield	FX	2002	Ended
November 27	My Gym Partner's a Monkey	Cartoon Network	2005	Cancelled
December 1	Modelville	Syndication	2008	Cancelled
December 2	The Janice Dickinson Modeling Agency	Oxygen	2006	Cancelled
December 6	Hulk Hogan's Celebrity Championship Wrestling	CMT	2008	Cancelled
December 6	Horseland	Cookie Jar TV	2006	Cancelled
December 6	Care Bears: Adventures in Care-a-lot	Cookie Jar TV	2007	Cancelled
December 6	DinoSquad	Cookie Jar TV	2007	Cancelled
December 7	Rugrats Pre-School Daze	Nickelodeon	2008	Cancelled
December 8	Boston Legal	ABC	2004	Ended
December 12	South of Nowhere	The N	2005	Cancelled
December 13	Trading Spaces (returned in 2018)	TLC	2000	Cancelled
December 15	My Own Worst Enemy	NBC	2008	Cancelled
December 17	Chocolate News	Comedy Central	2008	Cancelled
December 17	Stylista	The CW	2008	Cancelled
December 18	Testees	FX	2008	Cancelled
December 18	DragonflyTV	PBS Kids	2002	Cancelled
December 18	Moral Orel	Adult Swim	2005	Cancelled
December 21	Next	MTV	2005	Cancelled
December 21	Brotherhood	Showtime	2006	Cancelled
December 24	The Black Carpet	BET	2006	Cancelled
December 30	Extreme Trains	History	2008	Cancelled

=== Made-for-TV movies ===
Date of airing	Title	Channel
January 25	Minutemen	Disney Channel
February 17	Knight Rider	NBC
March 16	The Cutting Edge: Chasing the Dream	ABC Family
April 20	Princess	ABC Family
June 6	Polar Bears	Nickelodeon
June 8	The Circuit	ABC Family
June 20	Camp Rock	Disney Channel
July 13	Picture This	ABC Family
July 19	Sozin's Comet	Nickelodeon
August 22	The Cheetah Girls: One World	Disney Channel
September 6	Samurai Girl	ABC Family
September 12	Gym Teacher: The Movie	Nickelodeon
October 12	Underfist: Halloween Bash	Cartoon Network
October 18	Polar Bears	Nickelodeon
October 18	Living Proof	Lifetime
November 8	iGo to Japan	Nickelodeon
November 27	Destination: Imagination	Cartoon Network
December 5	Merry Christmas, Drake & Josh	Nickelodeon

=== Miniseries ===
Premiere	Title	Channel
March 16	John Adams	HBO
May 26	The Andromeda Strain	A&E
July 13	Generation Kill	HBO
November 16	Rugrats Pre-School Daze	Nickelodeon

== Networks and services ==
=== Network launches ===
Network	Type	Launch date	Notes	Source
Kentucky Channel	Over-the-air multicast (Kentucky only)	January 1	A public television service provided by the Kentucky Educational Television network, the channel is devoted to Kentucky-related programming from several sources, including the statewide PBS member's vast in-house production archives.	
Hulu	OTT streaming	March 12		
Pursuit Channel	Cable and satellite Over-the-air multicast (in some markets)	April 23	Airs programming centered on outdoor sports, hunting, and fishing	
LAT TV	Cable television	May 20		
SWX Right Now	Regional cable-only/over-the-air multicast	August 30	A regional network providing high school and college sporting events and weather information throughout central and western Montana, the Idaho Panhandle, and eastern Washington state, by way of digital subchannels of several Cowles Company-owned stations.	
This TV	Over-the-air multicast	November 1	Announced on July 21, it is a channel designed for over-the-air stations' digital subchannels featuring movies and a selection of regular series. It originally launched as a joint venture between Metro-Goldwyn-Mayer and Weigel Broadcasting.	
My Family TV	Cable television	December 15		
The Ski Channel	Cable and satellite	December 25		

=== Conversions and rebrandings ===
Old network name	New network name	Type	Conversion date	Notes	Source
CourtTV	TruTV	Cable and satellite	January 1		
Discovery Times	Investigation Discovery	Cable and satellite	January 27	In addition to the television network, an Investigation Discovery website was also launched. Contributors to the website include crime writers David Lohr, Corey Mitchell, and Gary C. King.	
Fox Sports New York	MSG Plus	Cable and satellite	March 10		
College Sports Television	CBS College Sports Network	Cable and satellite	March 16, 2008		
BBC World	BBC World News	Cable television	April 21		
Discovery Home Channel	Planet Green	Cable and satellite	June 4	Facing increased competition in the home-oriented programming sector, Discovery Communications planned a 24-hour channel focused on eco-friendly living in an attempt to capitalize on a rising environmental movement. Discovery Home was relaunched as the environmentally-themed Planet Green at 6:00 p.m. ET.	
World Championship Sports Network	Universal Sports	Cable television	June 16		
Music: High Definition	Palladia	Cable television	September 1		
The Prayer Channel	New Evangelization Television	Cable television	December 8		

=== Network closures ===
Network	Type	Launch date	Closure date	Notes	Source
VH1 Uno	Cable/satellite network	2000	February 2, 2008	VH1 Uno was discontinued by MTV Networks to expand distribution of mtvU beyond college campuses and onto regular cable systems.	
Shop at Home Network	Cable/satellite and over-the-air network	1987	March 8, 2008		
International Channel	Cable television	1990	April 9, 2008		
NBC Weather Plus	Cable/satellite and over-the-air multicast	November 15, 2004	December 31, 2008		

== Television stations ==
=== Station launches ===
Date	City of license/Market	Station	Channel	Affiliation	Notes/Ref.
January 15	Corpus Christi, Texas	KUQI	38	Independent	
February 18	Gainesville, Georgia (Atlanta)	WGGD-LD	15	Daystar	
April 28	Fayetteville, Arkansas	KHOG-DT2	29.2	The CW Plus	
April 28	Fort Smith, Arkansas	KHBS-DT2	40.2	The CW Plus	
May 7	Wilmington, North Carolina	WWAY-DT2	3.2	Independent (local weather)	
May 28	Memphis, Tennessee	WTWV	23.1	Religious independent	
July 8	Tulsa, Oklahoma	KXAP-LP	14	Spanish independent	
August 1	Wheeling, West Virginia	WTRF-DT3	7.2	ABC	
August 7	Florence, South Carolina	WMBF-TV	32	NBC	
August 8	Clarksburg/Fairmont, West Virginia	WBOY-DT2	12.2	ABC	
August 8	Wheeling, West Virginia (Steubenville, Ohio)	WTRF-DT3	7.3	ABC	
October 25	Bend, Oregon	KBNZ-LD	7.1	CBS	Converted from a former translator of KOIN/Portland
November 27	Great Falls, Montana	KFBB-DT2	5.2	Fox	
December 27	Hibbing, Minnesota	WRPT	31	PBS	Satellite of WDSE/Duluth
December 31	Gainesville, Florida	WNBW-DT	9.1	NBC	
Unknown date	Hattiesburg, Mississippi	WDAM-DT2	7.2	This TV	
Unknown date	Jonesboro, Arkansas	KAIT-DT2	8.2	Independent (Local weather)	
Unknown date	Key West, Florida	WEYW-LP	19	Independent	
Unknown date	Nashville, Tennessee	WKRN-DT2	2.2	Independent (Local weather)	Nashville WX Channel
Unknown date	Tupelo, Mississippi	WTVA-DT2	9.2	FamilyNet	

=== Network affiliation changes ===
Date	City of license/Market	Station	Channel	Old affiliation	New affiliation	Notes/Ref.
February 4	Corpus Christi, Texas	KUQI	38	Independent	Fox	
August 1	San Diego, California	KSWB-TV	69.1	The CW	Fox	
August 1	Tijuana, Baja California, Mexico (San Diego, California)	XETV-TV	6.1	Fox	The CW	
December 31	Charlottesville, Virginia	WVIR-DT2	29.2	NBC Weather Plus	Independent (local weather)	
Unknown date	Marquette, Michigan	WLUC-DT2	6.2	NBC Weather Plus	Universal Sports	

=== Station closures ===
Date	City of license/Market	Station	Channel	Affiliation	Sign-on date	Notes
January 25	Havre, Montana	KBBJ	9	NBC	January 2, 2001	Satellite of KTVH-DT/Helena, Montana
January 25	Lewistown, Montana	KBAO	13	NBC	January 3, 2001	Satellite of KTVH-DT/Helena, Montana
May 25	Walla Walla, Washington	KCWK	9	The CW	March 23, 2001 (as KBKI)	
September 30	Rockford, Illinois	WCFC-CA	51	Total Living Network	March 6, 1986 (as W68BR)	
Unknown date	Ontario, Oregon	KMDA-LP	19	America One	September 18, 1985	

== Births ==
Date	Name	Notability
January 3	Raegan Revord	Actress (Young Sheldon)
March 14	Abby Ryder Fortson	Actress (Togetherness)
May 29	Laila Lockhart Kraner	Actress (Gabby's Dollhouse)
July 15	Iain Armitage	Actor (Young Sheldon, Big Little Lies)
August 1	Eliana Su'a	Actress (Pretty Freekin Scary)
August 5	Devin Trey Campbell	Actor (Single Parents)
August 6	Kensington Tallman	Actress (Home Sweet Rome)
September 17	Mia Talerico	Actress (Good Luck Charlie)
October 10	Santino Barnard	Actor (The Kids Are Alright)
October 24	Liamani Segura	Actress (High School Musical: The Musical: The Series) and singer
November 3	Audrey Grace Marshall	Actress (The Flight Attendant, The Fairly OddParents: Fairly Odder)
December 11	Chloe Coleman	Actress (Big Little Lies, Upload)
December 22	Madeleine McGraw	Actress (Secrets of Sulphur Springs)

== Deaths ==
Date	Name	Age	Notability
January 6	Bob LeMond	94	Radio and TV announcer (Ozzie and Harriet, Leave It to Beaver)
January 15	Brad Renfro	25	Actor
January 17	Allan Melvin	84	Actor (Magilla Gorilla, The Brady Bunch, All in the Family)
January 18	Lois Nettleton	80	Actress (In the Heat of the Night)
January 19	Suzanne Pleshette	70	Actress (Emily Hartley on The Bob Newhart Show)
January 22	Heath Ledger	28	Australian actor
January 24	Jahna Steele	49	Transgender entertainer (was "outed" on A Current Affair in 1992, guest-starred on NYPD Blue)
February 1	Shell Kepler	49	Actress and presenter (General Hospital, HSN host)
February 4	Augusta Dabney	89	Actress (Another World, A World Apart, Loving)
February 6	John McWethy	60	ABC News correspondent from 1979 to 2006
February 10	Ron Leavitt	60	Writer and producer (Happy Days, Married... with Children)
February 10	Roy Scheider	75	Actor (Capt. Bridger on seaQuest)
February 10	Steve Gerber	60	Illustrator/animator (Thundarr The Barbarian)
February 12	David Groh	68	Actor (Joe Gerard on Rhoda)
February 14	Perry Lopez	78	Character actor (Star Trek)
February 18	Grits Gresham	85	Outdoor sportscaster (The American Sportsman)
February 27	Myron Cope	79	Sportscaster at WTAE/Pittsburgh and color commentator for Pittsburgh Steelers broadcasts
February 27	William F. Buckley, Jr.	82	Host and commentator (Firing Line)
March 16	Ivan Dixon	76	Actor, producer and director (Hogan's Heroes)
April 5	Charlton Heston	84	Actor (The Colbys)
April 8	Stanley Kamel	65	Actor (Monk)
May 1	Hager Twins	66	One-half of Hager Twins and a regular on Hee Haw
May 2	Beverlee McKinsey	72	Soap opera actress (Another World, Texas, Guiding Light)
May 11	Dick Sutcliffe	90	Christian children's TV producer/animator (Davey and Goliath)
May 15	Alexander Courage	88	Composer (Star Trek theme song)
May 18	Joseph Pevney	96	Director (Bonanza)
May 24	Dick Martin	86	Comedian and director (Rowan & Martin's Laugh-In)
May 25	Mitch Mullany	39	Actor (Nick Freno: Licensed Teacher)
May 26	Earle Hagen	88	Music composer (The Andy Griffith Show)
May 26	Sydney Pollack	73	Producer, director and actor (The Fugitive, Will & Grace, The Sopranos)
May 29	Harvey Korman	81	Actor and comedian (The Carol Burnett Show, The Flintstones, Hey Arnold!)
June 2	Mel Ferrer	90	Actor, producer and director (Falcon Crest, Return of the Saint)
June 7	Jim McKay	86	Sportscaster and journalist for ABC, CBS and NBC Sports
June 7	Neil MacNeil	85	Journalist (Washington Week in Review)
June 12	Charlie Jones	77	Sportscaster for NBC and ABC Sports; play-by-play TV announcer for AFL and NFL games
June 13	Tim Russert	58	Journalist for NBC News and host of Meet the Press from 1991 to 2008
June 15	Tony Schwartz	84	Sound archivist, ad executive and creator of Lyndon B. Johnson's 1964 "Daisy" political ad
June 17	Cyd Charisse	86	Actress, dancer (The Love Boat, Frasier, Fantasy Island, Burke's Law)
June 21	Kermit Love	91	Puppeteer, costume designer, actor (Sesame Street)
June 22	Dody Goodman	93	Actress (Mary Hartman, Mary Hartman)
June 22	George Carlin	71	Actor, writer, comedian (The George Carlin Show, Shining Time Station)
June 29	Don S. Davis	65	Actor (Stargate SG-1, Twin Peaks)
July 3	Larry Harmon	83	Entertainer (Bozo the Clown)
July 4	Jesse Helms	86	Politician and journalist for WRAL-TV, Raleigh, North Carolina
July 12	Tony Snow	53	Commentator (Fox News Sunday) and White House Press Secretary
July 17	Larry Haines	89	Actor (Search for Tomorrow)
July 21	K-Swift	29	Club radio DJ, hip-hop producer and remixer (The Wire, BET's Rap City)
July 22	Estelle Getty	84	Actress (The Golden Girls)
August 6	John K. Cooley	80	Journalist and author (ABC News)
August 7	Bernie Brillstein	77	Producer and agent (Buffalo Bill, ALF, The Larry Sanders Show, NewsRadio)
August 9	Bernie Mac	50	Actor and comedian (The Bernie Mac Show)
August 10	Isaac Hayes	65	Singer, songwriter and voiceover artist (South Park)
August 12	Bill Stulla	97	"Engineer Bill" – children's show host ("Cartoon Express" on KHJ-TV/Los Angeles from 1954 to 1966)
August 19	Julius Carry	56	Actor (Doctor, Doctor, The Adventures of Brisco County, Jr.)
August 22	Jeff MacKay	59	Actor (Magnum, P.I.)
August 31	Ike Pappas	75	News reporter (CBS News)
September 1	Don LaFontaine	68	Voice-over announcer (Entertainment Tonight)
September 1	Jerry Reed	71	Actor and singer (The New Scooby-Doo Movies, The Glen Campbell Goodtime Hour, The Concrete Cowboys, Hee Haw)
September 12	George Putnam	94	News personality
October 5	Lloyd Thaxton	81	Host and producer (The Lloyd Thaxton Show, Fight Back! With David Horowitz)
October 11	Neal Hefti	85	Theme music composer (Batman, The Odd Couple (the film) and the TV series))
October 15	Jack Narz	85	Game show host (Beat the Clock, Concentration)
October 25	Anne Pressly	26	Anchorwoman and special assignment reporter for KATV/Little Rock, Arkansas
November 4	Michael Crichton	66	Author and screenwriter (ER)
November 11	Herb Score	75	Baseball player and TV/Radio play-by-play announcer for the Cleveland Indians
December 1	Paul Benedict	70	Character actor, writer and director (The Jeffersons, Sesame Street)
December 5	Beverly Garland	82	Actress, singer and businesswoman (My Three Sons, Scarecrow and Mrs. King, The Angry Beavers)
December 8	Robert Prosky	77	Actor (Hill Street Blues)
December 12	Van Johnson	92	Actor and singer (Batman, Here's Lucy, The Pied Piper of Hamelin (1957 television film))
December 13	Maddie Blaustein	48	Voice actress (Pokémon, Yu-Gi-Oh!, Dinosaur King)
December 18	Majel Barrett	76	Actress (Star Trek: The Original Series)
December 25	Eartha Kitt	81	Actress, dancer and singer (Batman, My Life as a Teenage Robot, The Emperor's New School)

== See also ==
- 2008 in the United States
- List of American films of 2008
