= List of Chase (2008 TV series) episodes =

This is a list of episodes of the Sci Fi Channel game show Chase.

The show follows 10 contestants, allowed to roam around an area of the Port of Los Angeles, as they try to not get caught by a group of hunters. It was based on a Japanese original.

== Episode 1 ==
Gameboard: The Harbor 1.0

=== Contestants ===
| Name | Gender | Age | From | Occupation | Prize money (USD) | Status |
|---|---|---|---|---|---|---|
| Bill | Male | 33 | Huntsville, AL | Financial Analyst | $25,000 | Winner |
| Demetrios | Male | 35 | Bronx, NY | Yogi and Florist | $0 | Lost |
| Cynthia | Female | 28 | Pittsburgh, PA | Personal Trainer | $0 | Lost |
| Eva | Female | 47 | San Antonio, TX | Translator | $0 | Lost |
| Mecca | Female | 36 | Anaheim, CA | Dancer | $0 | 4th Captured (by Grant) |
| Cleavant | Male | 22 | Los Angeles, CA | Unemployed | $0 | Disqualified |
| Laura | Female | 30 | Chicago, IL | Personal Assistant | $0 | 3rd Captured (by Grant) |
| Arielle | Female | 22 | Oak Park, CA | Sales Associate | $0 | 2nd Captured (by Amazon) |
| Jason | Male | 37 | Boston, MA | Carpenter | $3,000 | Opted Out |
| Bryan | Male | 28 | El Paso, TX | I.T. Consultant | $0 | 1st Captured (by Grant) |

Note: In this and subsequent tables, "Lost" means the player had not been captured when the game ended (either as time expired or a contestant reached the exit point).

=== Episode Summary ===
Map: Terminal Island, a deserted seaside port with two ferries provided for easy shuttling. Only three contestants could ride a ferry at once, and none of the hunters could board them.

The contestants' first mission was to arrange barrels in a specific order. Midway through the first mission, the first two hunters, Grant and Vazquez, were released. The contestants completed the mission, earning each of them a deflector, and then broke off into multiple groups. Bryan, Cleavant, and Demetrios went across the harbor on the ferry (which they had to stay on the entire time). Jason and Mecca stayed together, getting on the boats later with Bill, who had had to use his deflector against Icey shortly after she was released. The rest of the contestants went to explore or hide away from the starting point, where Eva found a $1,000 flag.

After Bryan, Cleavant and Demetrios disembarked from the ferry, Bryan used his deflector against Grant, but was eliminated anyway after Grant came back after him; Cleavant had promised to protect Bryan, but did not.

Shortly thereafter, the host announced that the contestant's backpacks would make a loud alarm sound in 10 minutes. To deactivate the alarm, a contestant would have to stand back-to-back with another contestant and interlock two special panels. Doing so would also award invisibility glasses, however, once deactivated, the contestant could not deactivate anyone else's alarm. Shortly after this announcement, Laura and Arielle used their deflectors on Grant. Bill helped Jason and Mecca deactivate their backpacks on the ferry while Arielle, Cynthia, Eva and Laura then met to do the same thing on land. Shortly before the mission time expired, another hunter, Amazon, was released. Laura, then seeing a hunter, activated her invisibility glasses. Bill, Cleavant and Demetrios were all unable to deactivate their backpack in time, therefore setting off their alarms.

The host called to give a clue: "Stay seaside if you want to see the money." A few minutes later, he called to offer $3,000 for the first player to call him and quit the game. Jason, tempted by an offer, called the host and accepted the $3,000 for leaving the game. Laura also called in, but was too late. She was then forced to cross the ferry, as Cleavant crossed on the other side. The backpack alarms turned off, right before Arielle and Cynthia were sighted by Amazon. Arielle used her invisibility glasses and Cynthia used her deflector to avoid being captured.

The host called to announce that there are Sonic Stunners available at two different locations. On their way to obtain them, Arielle, Cynthia and Eva were cornered by Amazon and Icey. Amazon captured Arielle after the other two contestants used their invisibility glasses, therefore making her the second captured. Bill found one of the two locations, which was marked with a sign that read "Hunter Access Denied." However, he found another hunter, Scott, inside a cage in the middle of the room. It was announced that she, along with another hunter (Kim) at the other location, would be released in 5 minutes, the task to win the Sonic Stunner was to pedal half a mile on a stationary bike next to the cage, and that there was only one Stunner available at each location. Bill climbed onto a bike (and simultaneously teased Scott via asking if she was in there for jaywalking), and earned the Stunner with approximately 90 seconds to spare. Mecca arrived too late, and at the other station Cynthia won her stunner one minute before Kim was released. Laura was captured by Grant as soon as she left the ferry, without even attempting to run.

The contestants were called again, and informed that the hunters in the cages were to be released, and that the top half of the gameboard (top refers to the top side of the map) would be shut down in 5 minutes; any contestants out of bounds at the end of that time would be eliminated from the game. After this announcement, Cleavant had some difficulty orienting himself correctly with the assistance of his map and was out-of-bounds when time expired; as such, he was disqualified.

Wong was then released to spot contestants on a Spyder motorcycle and alert the other hunters (although he could not capture a runner himself). Mecca was quickly spotted, and used her deflector not knowing another hunter was coming, forcing her to use her invisibility glasses. 2 minutes before the end of the game, the finish line was then disclosed as Al Larson's marina; if the contestants failed to cross under the blue gate at the marina by the end of the game, they would win nothing. Grant, using Wong's assistance, was able to capture Mecca on her way to the marina. Bill used his sonic stunner just in time to avoid being captured by Amazon, and made it to the marina first, winning $25,000. Demetrios arrived only a few seconds later. Eva was very angry because she could not find the exit point. Had she made it, she would have won an extra $1,000 because of the money flag she had found.

== Episode 2 ==
Gameboard: The Botanical Gardens 1.0 (In Honor of Green Week)

=== Contestants ===
| Name | Gender | Age | From | Occupation | Prize money (USD) | Status |
|---|---|---|---|---|---|---|
| Dianne | Female | 26 | Kansas City, MO | Bartender | $25,000 | Winner |
| Tyler | Male | 22 | Orange County, CA | Marketer | $0 | Lost |
| Paul | Male | 29 | Philadelphia, PA | Filmmaker | $0 | Lost |
| Portia | Female | 21 | Agoura Hills, CA | Student | $0 | 6th Captured (by Wong) |
| Jessica | Female | 25 | Boise, ID | Marketing Director | $0 | 5th Captured (by Wong) |
| Steve | Male | 36 | New Bedford, MA | Police Sergeant | $0 | 4th Captured (by Grant) |
| Wahed | Male | 22 | Los Angeles, CA | Security Guard | $0 | 3rd Captured (by Vazquez) |
| Lucy | Female | 26 | Cincinnati, OH | Realtor | $2,000 | Opted Out |
| Mardell | Female | 34 | Cupertino, CA | Realtor | $0 | 2nd Captured (by Vazquez) |
| Shane | Male | 37 | Defiance, OH | Mortgage Broker | $0 | 1st Captured (by Vazquez) |

=== Episode Summary ===
Map: Descanso Gardens

The contestants were taken directly to the first mission by the host. They divided into two groups of 5 and entered cages made of bamboo. The mission was for the contestants to move the cages along a predetermined path and obtain tools to cut themselves out of the cages. Going further along the path would give better cutting tools. The teams were given only 5 minutes to escape. The first team to break out of the cage would win a bag of five deflectors; the second group could grab deflectors hidden near the fountain area, but only if they escape in time.

The players in cage 1 (Mardell, Shane, Jessica, Dianne, and Lucy) retrieved all four tools before beginning to cut, while the players in cage 2 (Paul, Wahed, Tyler, Portia, and Steve) cut the cage somewhat between the second and third tools. About two minutes into the mission, the first two hunters, Grant and Wong, were released. The players in cage 2 broke free first, winning the guaranteed deflectors. The players in cage 1 got free with 7 seconds to spare, however, they had to search for their deflectors.

Shortly after breaking out of the cages, Wahed sighted an inactive hunter (Icey), as well as a money flag ($1,000). A few seconds later, another hunter, Vazquez, was introduced into the game.

Mardell dropped her deflector as she was chased by Vazquez, but retrieved it and used it on him just in time. Shane used his own on Wong after taunting him. Icey was then released onto the board. Portia used her deflector on Grant after failing to remain hidden behind a low wall due to a snap of a twig. Paul ran away from Icey and met up with Shane, who had just gotten away from Grant. They both split up after seeing Icey and then Paul used his deflector on Grant.

The host then called with the second mission, a tripwire maze at each of three locations; a Sonic Stunner was available at the center of each one. The mission would only be active for 5 minutes. Some of the wires, if pulled, would activate alarms. Wahed and Portia ran from the mission after Portia activated an alarm. Despite tripping several alarms, Tyler got a Stunner, as did Dianne. Shortly after the end of the mission, Shane was captured by Vazquez. Upon learning of Shane's elimination, Dianne and Lucy both expressed amusement, as Shane had made belittling remarks about them earlier.

Tyler and Steve both used their deflectors as Wong and Icey approached them. Tyler then used his Sonic Stunner on Grant. Wahed gave his map to Dianne and Lucy, who had lost theirs near the beginning of the game. The host called with the exit point clue "Stay on track and you could win." After managing to dodge Icey, Mardell was captured by Vazquez. Shortly afterward, the host offered a $2,000 buy-out for the first person to call him. Lucy accepted the buy-out, and gave Dianne the map she had acquired from Wahed.

Wahed used his deflector on Wong, but was sighted by Vazquez shortly after. He fell into a ditch, and kept slipping in his efforts to get out. Vazquez did not even attempt to capture Wahed until after he escaped the ditch, but captured Wahed as they ran around the fountain. As such, the money flag Wahed had found was nullified. Steve was then captured by Grant while trying to read his map. Shortly afterward, Jessica used her deflector on Icey, and Dianne used her Sonic Stunner on Wong.

The host then called with the final mission: to take a photograph of any active hunter with the camera in the phone in order to earn invisibility glasses. The mission was only available for 10 minutes, and with the start of the mission, a fifth hunter, Kim, was released. Paul was the first to earn his glasses. Portia snapped a photo of Grant to earn hers, but had to use them immediately. Tyler also photographed Grant to earn his glasses, but was able to preserve them by evading him. Paul was nearly taken by Kim, but used his glasses before he was tagged, thus keeping him in the game. After a short chase, Wong captured Jessica. Directly afterwards, the host called with a second exit point clue: "In this game, the early bird catches $25K." Portia was then captured by Wong.

Shortly before the exit point was revealed, T-Bo was released on a Segway Personal Transporter as the "spotter hunter," meaning he would alert the other hunters on sighting a contestant, but would not capture a contestant. He sighted Paul, and alerted the other hunters. Paul ran, and was quickly found by Icey, but he managed to evade her.

The host called to announce that the exit point was maintenance gate #2, and that the players had to open the gate and go through to win. Tyler then used his glasses to avoid being captured by Wong, and made it to the gate first, however, he did not actually push through the gate, leaving an opening for Dianne to push through and win by a split second.

== Episode 3 ==
Gameboard: The Studio Backlot 1.0

Special Guest Hunter: Former WWE wrestler Ricky Ortiz

=== Contestants ===
| Name | Gender | Age | From | Occupation | Prize money (USD) | Status |
|---|---|---|---|---|---|---|
| Trisha | Female | 28 | Santa Monica, CA | Artist | $26,000 | Winner |
| London | Male | 46 | Mt. Holly, NJ | US Coast Guard (Retired) | $0 | Lost |
| Adria | Female | 25 | Seattle, WA | Bartender | $0 | 7th Captured (by Ricky Ortiz) |
| Lucas | Male | 32 | Carlsbad, CA | Student | $0 | 6th Captured (by Kim) |
| Andrew | Male | 21 | Redondo Beach, CA | Student / Lifeguard | $0 | 5th Captured (by Kim) |
| Tracy | Female | 30 | Mililani, HI | Student | $0 | 4th Captured (by Grant) |
| Lynda | Female | 59 | Los Angeles, CA | General Contractor | $0 | 3rd Captured (by Icey) |
| Darin | Male | 46 | Fontana, CA | Sports Official | $0 | 2nd Captured (by Wong) |
| Evan | Male | 29 | Long Island, NY | Teacher | $2,000 | Opted Out |
| Ameenah | Female | 34 | Atlanta, GA | Drummer | $0 | 1st Captured (by Grant) |

=== Episode Summary ===
Map: Universal Studios Backlot

The contestants were separated into 2 teams of 5. Blue team included London, Adria, Ameenah, Lucas, and Trisha. Red team included Tracy, Evan, Andrew, Lynda, and Darin. The host revealed that their first challenge would be to race over to Robertson's Saloon, where the teams would have to bounce a laser off of mirrors and light up a disco ball to earn Deflectors. The losing team would have to search for hidden Deflectors outside the Saloon. The Blue team arrived at the saloon first (Tracy dropped her map, causing Darin to go back and get it) and they managed to light up their disco ball first. The Red team managed to get their ball to light up, and everyone but Lynda found a Deflector. 5 minutes into the game, the first 2 hunters, Grant and Wong, were released.

Lucas began searching and collecting many of the money flags ($1,000 apiece) quickly, and the 3rd hunter (Vazquez) was released shortly afterward. London and Trisha formed an alliance, while Lucas used his Deflector on Grant. Shortly afterward, Trisha used her Deflector on Wong and London used his on Vazquez, who was chasing Evan.

The host then called the runners, informing them of their next challenge, which he titled "Hamper the Hunter". They were to head over to Jaws Lake, where the special guest hunter (ECW's Ricky Ortiz) was placed. The runners were informed to remove a 5-pound weight in their packs and place it in a vest on Ortiz. Once completed, they could grab a Sonic Stunner. On her way to Jaws Lake, Ameenah managed to escape Wong, but had to use her Deflector on Grant right afterward. In the middle of the challenge, the 4th hunter (Icey) was released. Darin hesitated with the challenge, while the rest of the runners received a Sonic Stunner and some insults from Ortiz. Shortly afterward, Ameenah used her Sonic Stunner on Grant, and Ricky Ortiz was then released. Ameenah was once again chased by Grant and ran into a dead end, causing her to become the first runner captured.

The host called to reveal the first clue to the hidden exit point: "Steer clear of the Bates Motel". Lucas continued to collect many of the money flags, while Andrew and Darin met up. The host called to signal the half-point of the game, and to offer $2,000 for the first runner to call him and quit the game. Evan and Darin were tempted by the offer, and Evan received the money while Darin tried to figure out how to call the host.

Darin and Andrew were then chased by Icey, who was deflected by Darin. Seconds later, Darin was captured by Wong and Andrew used his Deflector on Grant. Icey captured Lynda from behind, and Tracy used her Deflector on Ortiz and her Sonic Stunner on Wong back to back. Tracy then met up with Adria and the two of them ducked into an alley. Grant ran in the alley and captured Tracy and Adria used her Sonic Stunner on him afterward.

The host called to reveal the last challenge. They were to head to one of two locations (Denver St. or the War of the Worlds set) where a deactivation station was set up. They would have to swipe their runner cards into the machine, that would deactivate a homing device on their packs. They would also earn the Invisibility Glasses. He also informed the runners that Ortiz would drop the extra weight placed on him earlier, making him faster. Lucas used his Sonic Stunner on Ortiz right in front of the station at Denver St.. Trisha used her Sonic Stunner on Wong and Adria mistakenly used her Deflector on him while he was frozen. Everyone but Andrew got their devices deactivated and Andrew used his Sonic Stunner on Ortiz as a result.

Trisha and Adria spotted an inactive hunter (Kim) on Denver St. and Trisha used her glasses to escape capture from Wong. Kim was released shortly afterward and Adria used her glasses to escape capture from Kim and Wong. However, 30 seconds later, she briefly removed her glasses, causing them to become useless. London used his Sonic Stunner to avoid capture from Grant. Lucas used his glasses to avoid capture from Grant, Kim, and Wong, but later, he made the same mistake as Adria by removing his glasses momentarily. Andrew's device was still going off and he was captured by Kim. London then used his glasses to avoid capture from Vazquez. Lucas was then chased by Ortiz and was captured by Kim, who had come at Lucas unseen and from another direction.

The host then called to reveal the exit point. The exit point was a red flag on the hanging shark at Jaws Lake, and the first runner to grab the flag would win all of their money collected. Adria was chased by Kim and Ortiz on her way there, and was captured by Ortiz inside a building. London managed to stay ahead of Trisha all the way to the hanging shark, but Trisha grabbed the flag off the shark first by a split second, winning the $25,000. She actually won $26,000 because she also found a money flag.

== Episode 4 ==
Gameboard: The Warehouse District 1.0

=== Contestants ===
| Name | Gender | Age | From | Occupation | Prize money (USD) | Status |
|---|---|---|---|---|---|---|
| Davey | Male | 24 | Annapolis, MD | Singer | $26,000 | Winner |
| Anup | Male | 37 | Austin, TX | Graphic Designer | $0 | Lost |
| Apryl | Female | 38 | Los Angeles, CA | Marketing Analyst | $0 | Lost |
| Des | Male | 70 | New York, NY | Real Estate Broker | $0 | Lost |
| Josh | Male | 38 | Austin, TX | Sales | $0 | 6th Captured (by Kim) |
| Cassy | Female | 23 | Aurora, CO | Marketing | $0 | 5th Captured (by Amazon) |
| Brianna | Female | 21 | Los Angeles, CA | Sales Associate | $0 | 4th Captured (by Scott) |
| Dalet | Female | 26 | San Diego, CA | Model | $0 | 3rd Captured (by Scott) |
| Jenny | Female | 32 | Alta Loma, CA | Auto Finance | $0 | 2nd Captured (by Kim) |
| Brian | Male | 25 | Napa, CA | Server | $0 | 1st Captured (by Kim) |

=== Episode Summary ===
Map: The Warehouse District, a busy area where each street is filled with people shopping. The runners and Hunters would also have to obey all traffic laws, which could have been an advantage and a disadvantage as well.

The contestant's first challenge was to run to a nearby shipping warehouse. There, they would have 5 minutes to assemble a series of gears to open the warehouse door, where they would receive a Deflector from inside. 10 gears were provided, but only 7 were needed to open the door. The host released the first Hunter (Vazquez) in the middle of the challenge. After about 4 minutes, they opened the door and received their Deflectors. All the runners split up and some of them paired up. The pairs included Anup & Brian, Dalet & Jenny, and Josh & Cassy. The host released the second Hunter (Wong) onto the gameboard afterwards. While most of the runners headed up north, Davey headed south, stating he wanted to avoid the other runners. Brian and Anup spotted Vazquez before he began to chase them. Brianna and Davey were nearby and ran away from Vazquez as well. Brian ended up having to use his Deflector. Many of the players began alerting each other of the Hunters. Hunter Kim was released shortly afterwards and headed towards Brian and Anup on the south side of the board. Up on the north side Davey spotted Vazquez and ran away, telling Cassy and Josh no one was following him. Davey's plan backfired and Vazquez gave chase to him, forcing Davey to use his Deflector. Brian and Anup stopped in an alley to look at their map. Hunter Kim came around the corner and captured Brian before he could move. Anup then used his Deflector on Kim. Brianna used her Deflector on Wong after a short chase.

The host then called to reveal the second challenge. The runners would have to use their locators given to them earlier in the game to locate a case hidden in one of three locations (Flower shop, fabric mart, or luggage shop) on the game board, inside the cases contained invisibility glasses. Anup and Jenny broke their locators running from hunters and were unable to gain their invisibility glasses and Brianna decided not to take on the mission, since she was alone and far away from any of the mission areas. Josh, Cassy, Davey, Des, Dalet, and Apryl were able to find their glasses within the time limit. While searching for their glasses, two of the older contestants Apryl and Des decided to team up. During the challenge Dalet and Jenny were chased by Hunter Wong but were able to escape through an alleyway. Hunter Scott is released onto the field. Dalet and Jenny once again run into a Hunter. This time, Hunter Vazquez. Jenny uses her deflector on Hunter Vazquez. The host gives the first clue to the exit point telling them to stay near a wall. Des and Apryl figure they are at a "wall" while Josh and Cassy discover they need to stay near Wall St. Dalet and Jenny once again run into a hunter, this time Hunter Scott, but Dalet uses her deflector saving the two of them. Anup notices Dalet and Jenny's screaming. Davey once again runs into Josh and Cassy. Davey tells Josh and Cassy the two need to split from their "alliance" but Josh and Cassy do not listen to Davey and stay together. While Jenny and Dalet try to search for Wall Street, the two become cornered by Hunter Vazquez and a Hunter Kim. Dalet chooses to put on her invisibility glasses but Jenny with no weapons left is cornered by the hunters and is caught by Hunter Kim. Josh and Cassy leave Davey to himself. Davey is then able to find another $1,000 money flag. Hunter Amazon is then released onto the board. Dalet now by herself and wearing her invisibility glasses begins her search for wall street. Little does she know Hunter Scott is right next to her. Dalet removes her glasses to see her map and is spotted and caught by Hunter Scott.

Josh and Cassy are spotted by Hunter Scott. The two run but Hunter Scott is coming up fast. Josh tells Cassy to use her deflector, in which she does, deflecting Hunter Scott. The host calls the seven remaining contestants with the offer of opting out of the game. The only contestant to consider opting out is Brianna, who is alone and defenseless. But while trying to call the host, she is caught by Hunter Scott. The host gives the remaining runners their third and final mission for a sonic stunner. He gives two locations on the map, where they must maneuver a metallic disk through a metal maze. The winners are able to gain the sonic stunner. While Apryl and Des decide not to try to make the long distance to get the sonic stunners, Davey, Anup, Josh, and Cassy decide to go for it. However, en route Josh and Cassy become pinned down by Hunter Amazon. However Josh is able to use his deflector before Hunter Amazon can spot them. Anup and Davey make it to the two locations and each gain a sonic stunner. Josh and Cassy decide to lie low and not go for the sonic stunners. Hunter T-Bo is released onto the game board. Josh and Cassy spot Hunter Scott but Hunter Scott doesn't see them. After Hunter Scott leaves, Hunter Wong appears, keeping Josh and Cassy pinned down. Hunter Wong spots them and the chase begins. Cassy puts on her glasses making her invisible. Josh continues to run and is also spotted by Hunter Scott. Josh puts on his glasses just as Hunter Scott and Hunter Wong have him cornered. Josh and Cassy rejoin one another.

Meanwhile, Apryl and Des are far away from the action on the very south end of the gameboard. Hunter Icey is released as the spotter for the show in a small red truck. Anup decides to stay where he is but Hunter Kim is coming for him. Anup is able to use his Sonic Stunner and escape. The second clue is given. To find the street with the most alleyways. Josh and Cassy feel strongly that they are in the right spot. Davey runs into Hunter T-Bo and uses his sonic stunner. Davey once again runs into a second hunter, Hunter Wong and uses his invisibility glasses. The remaining contestants are given the exit point, a car ramp. The first one to get there wins the money. Apryl and Des feel strongly that they are close while Davey and Anup make a run for the exit point as well. Josh and Cassy make a dash as well but are spotted by Hunter Icey. The Hunters nearest to their location make a dash for Josh and Cassy. Hunter Amazon spots Josh and Cassy. Cassy tells Josh to keep going and gives herself up to Hunter Amazon. Davey is spotted by Hunter Kim but gets away. Davey is able to lose Hunter Kim when Josh comes around the corner and captures him instead. The final four make a run for it but in the end it is Davey that makes it to the exit point in time, winning $26,000 (including one $1,000 money flag bonus).

== Episode 5 ==
Gameboard: The Theme Park 1.0

=== Contestants ===
| Name | Gender | Age | From | Occupation | Prize money (USD) | Status |
|---|---|---|---|---|---|---|
| Haben | Male | 30 | Sacramento, CA | Server's Assistant | $0 | Lost |
| Larry | Male | 31 | Oakland, CA | Comedian / Waiter | $0 | 8th Captured (by Scott) |
| Niki | Female | 26 | Riverside, CA | Interior Designer | $3,000 | Opted Out |
| Nick | Male | 28 | Los Angeles, CA | Office Manager | $0 | 7th Captured (by Amazon) |
| Lauren | Female | 24 | Riverside, CA | Waitress | $0 | 6th Captured (by T-Bo) |
| Whitney | Female | 21 | Anaheim, CA | Receptionist | $0 | 5th Captured (by T-Bo) |
| Kyle | Male | 24 | Glendale, CA | Editor | $0 | 4th Captured (by Amazon) |
| Bernadette | Female | 30 | New York, NY | Attorney | $0 | 3rd Captured (by Amazon) |
| Brittanee | Female | 21 | San Diego, CA | Student | $0 | 2nd Captured (by Amazon) |
| Matthew | Male | 24 | San Francisco, CA | Voice Over Artist | $0 | 1st Captured (by Amazon) |

=== Episode summary ===
Map: Universal Studios Theme Park and CityWalk after closing hours.

The ten contestants were brought into the game zone and split into two teams of five, separated by gender with the attractive females (Bernadette, Brittanee, Lauren, Niki, and Whitney) on one side and the nerdy males (Haben, Kyle, Larry, Matthew, and Nick) on the other side. For their first mission, contestants had to break through a block of ice using various tools (Blow torch, Ice Pick, Hammer & Chisel) in order to gain their first weapon against their hunters, the freeze ray. All contestants were able to gain their freeze rays with the exception of Matthew. During the course of the first mission Hunter Amazon and Hunter T-Bo were released on to the course.

The ten players split up with Whitney, Bernadette, Niki, and Lauren sticking together and the others scattering throughout the course. While the others separated throughout the course and found multiple flags (more than any of the other episodes). They quickly became prey to the Hunters who had a field day with the contestants. Matthew was the first eliminated when he was caught from behind by Hunter Amazon, without even knowing he was being chased. Hunter T-Bo is released.

The alliance of the four girls (Whitney, Bernadette, Niki, and Lauren) walked through the main section of the park, but once Lauren spotted Hunter T Bo, the girls lost their nerve and ran. Whitney, Lauren, and Niki ran towards City Walk while Bernadette got separated from the group and stayed in Universal Studios. While in Universal Studios, Brittanee spots Hunter Amazon. A small chase ensued through the park and Brittanee was captured before she used her freeze ray. Hearing the Brittanee has been eliminated the three girl alliance cheered in celebration, angry at Brittanee earlier for leaving their alliance. Kyle spots Hunter Amazon in the park but is able to remain hidden when Bernadette shows up instead. Hunter T-Bo was already chasing Bernadette but she used her freeze ray on him just in time. Hunter Amazon then took over and caught Bernadette only seconds later.

Larry met up with the three girls in City Walk. Both parties wanted to use the other as bait for the hunters. Kyle is spotted back in the studios by Hunter Amazon, after a short chase Kyle gives up without using his freeze ray, making him the fourth person to be eliminated without using their weapons. After hearing of Kyle's elimination, Larry decides to team up with Lauren, Whitney, and Niki. Hunter Amazon, on a rampage during this game spots Nick and traps him in between a fence. But Nick is able to use his freeze ray and escape just in time.

The remaining six contestants are given their second mission. The remaining runners need to hand cuff one another to a member of the opposite sex within the time limit. If they do hand cuff themselves to another member then they gain deflectors, if they don't however, lights will be turned on in their packs making them easy to spot in the night time. While all three girls try to hand cuff themselves to Larry, Niki is the first to get to him. Leaving Lauren and Whitney without a partner. Desperate to find a male contestant Lauren and Whitney try to call Haben and gets him to meet them in the City Walk. But Hunter T-Bo is waiting for them and a chase begins. Niki and Larry escape, as does Lauren. But Whitney is hunted down and caught by Hunter T-Bo without using her freeze ray, making her contestant number three to not use it. Then Lauren is hunted down with her lights flashing she is caught by a hunter. She had a freeze ray but she froze when she was supposed to use it making her the 4th contestant not to use it.

After the five minutes are up, Haben, and Nick's lights on their packs stop flashing while Niki and Larry are allowed to take off the hand cuffs and get their deflectors. Niki and Larry decide to stick together. The clue tells them they need to remain near stairs. Haben, Niki, and Larry realizing there are plenty of stairs in the City Walk stay down their while Nick remains in the theme park. Hunter Scott is then released.

While Nick is in the theme park, he is spotted by Hunter Amazon. A chase begins. At first Nick gets away from the hunter but is then cornered and caught by Hunter Amazon. Niki and Larry argue about going back into Universal Studios. Larry wishes to go into Universal Studios while Niki wishes to stay in the city. Eventually Larry convinces Niki to go into the City Walk. This, however is not a good idea because Hunter T-Bo and Hunter Amazon are waiting for them. Larry uses his freeze ray on Hunter T-Bo and Niki uses her deflector on Hunter Amazon, keeping them safe.

The three remaining runners are given their third mission, if they succeed they gain invisibility glasses. They must watch a light sequence at one of the two locations then match the sequence with the buttons given to them. But they must do it quick because Hunters Icey and Grant are waiting at each station and are going to be released. Niki and Larry go to one of the locations while Haben goes to the other. Haben is able to complete the sequence quickly and gain the glasses. He blows Hunter Icey a kiss, something she is less than thrilled about. Niki and Larry aren't as quick with the sequence and take several minutes to figure out, but eventually they are able to win the glasses and escape before Hunter Grant is released. Hunter Grant and Hunter Icey are released.

Niki and Larry are spotted by Hunter Grant, but Niki uses her freeze ray, stopping Hunter Grant. The contestants are given their second clue, it isn't a good night to walk in the city. Although the clue tells the contestants to stay out of City Walk, Haben decides to stay stating "Oh... I beg to differ." Larry and Niki return to the Hunter infested Universal Studios. Hunter Scott is first to spot Niki and Larry. Niki puts on her invisibility glasses while Larry continues to run, splitting up the pair. Larry is able to escape from Hunter Scott. Meanwhile, in City Walk, Haben is spotted by Hunter T-Bo. But Haben uses his freeze ray, stopping T-Bo in his tracks.

Hunter Scott spots Larry but Larry uses his invisibility glasses. The host calls the three contestants giving them the opportunity to opt out. Larry and Niki attempt to call the host, but Niki is the one who gains the opt out and leaves the game with 3k, leaving Larry and Haben as the two remaining players. The contestants are given the exit point, the escalator exit from the park at the north section of the map. Haben still thinks the exit is in City Walk while Larry attempts a run for the exit. However, Larry is spotted by Hunter Amazon and Hunter Scott. Larry uses his last weapon on Hunter Amazon but Hunter Scott is right on his tail. Larry would eventually lose the battle with Scott and get caught, leaving Haben as the sole survivor. Haben, realizing where the exit is, makes a dash for Universal Studios but is too late. Time was up in the game making it the first and only episode where everyone loses.

== Episode 6 ==
Gameboard: Twins in the City 1.0

=== Contestants ===
| Name | Gender | Age | From | Occupation | Prize money (USD) | Status |
|---|---|---|---|---|---|---|
| Lisa | Female | 25 | Kaneohe, HI | Bartender | $25,000 | Winner |
| Lauren | Female | 25 | Kaneohe, HI | Marketing | $0 | Lost |
| Kate | Female | 22 | St. Paul, MN | Fit Model | $0 | Lost |
| Brandon | Male | 24 | San Francisco, CA | Medical Student | $0 | Lost |
| Ryan | Male | 24 | San Francisco, CA | Medical Student | $0 | Lost |
| Rory | Male | 30 | Manitoba, Canada | Branding Consultant | $0 | Lost |
| Troy | Male | 30 | Manitoba, Canada | Branding Consultant | $0 | Lost |
| Gary | Male | 33 | Goldsboro, NC | Entrepreneur | $0 | Disqualified |
| Larry | Male | 33 | Goldsboro, NC | Entrepreneur | $0 | Disqualified |
| Anne | Female | 22 | St. Paul, MN | Fit Model | $2,000 | Opted Out |

=== Episode summary ===
Map: Downtown Los Angeles

As in episode 4, the runners and Hunters would also have to obey all traffic laws, which could have been an advantage and a disadvantage as well.

The ten contestants, consisting of 5 pairs of twins are split into two teams, with each twin on different sides of a wall. As they start the first challenge they must think alike to win the first challenge, earning themselves freeze rays. For the challenge, there are a couple of symbols on each side of the wall, each round, they will have to choose the same symbol as their twin though telepathy. Once they do so, they may leave, having a head-start. First, Rory, Ryan, Gary & Lauren choose the bicycle while Anne chose the clock. On the other side Kate chose the train, Brandon & Ryan & Lisa & Lauren made a match. Then, Kate & Anne matched up with a house earning the freeze rays while Rory & Troy got matched up by picking bicycles. Being the only team left, Lary & Gary finally made a match-up with bicycles and all the twins decide to stick together. As Gary and Lary match and find a strategy, Gary decides to be the boss of the two by telling Lary what to do, telling him not to run so fast. As the runners venture off, Lauren finds a money flag, as well as her partner, Lisa. Rory calls Brandon and tells him to team up in order to double up on utilities.

Kate and Anne's strategy are that Kate looks back while Anne looks on forward.
Lisa and Lauren go up to a narrow lane but do not know if it is the right choice.
Lary has overcome Gary's bossiness by telling Gary that they need to get out of the area.
Gary decides this advice isn't right and stays in the area. Finally Brandon & Ryan, Troy & Rory.
After several minutes, Hunter T-Bo is released. Hunter Scott is closing in on Brandon, Ryan, Troy, and Rory. Spotting her, they are unsure if who they are seeing is a hunter, decides to turn around, only to bump into Hunter T-Bo. Troy uses his freeze ray on Hunter T-Bo as the group turns around, seemly forgetting Hunter Scott, as they run back to where she was, as she spots them again. They all make a run as Hunter Scott is running parallel to them but she is unable to catch them as the light turns red at the traffic junction in front of the group. Lary and Gary decide to stay in the mid-way point, deciding to guard from different sides of the street at the corners. At this happening,
Hunter Vasquez is released. Lisa and Lauren decide to try to make it to the perimeter of the game board, not knowing if it would be a good idea. Anne and Kate have just spotted Hunter Vasquez, as they are trying to figure out for the first time what the hunter's actually look like, not sure if they wore tuxedos or jump-suits.

The second mission requires the runners to find another runner and put their communication devices together to unlock a code, which in turn unlocks the invisibility glasses stashed in their partner's backpacks. As many of the twins are together, they easily finish the mission, gaining all of them invisibility glasses. While unlocking each other's glasses, Brandon & Ryan, Troy & Rory are spotted by Hunter T-Bo, leading Ryan to use his freeze ray.

Kate & Anne spot Hunter Vasquez before he spots them and runs into Lary & Gary while running away from them. Hunter Wong is released afterwards. After spotting a hunter, Kate & Anne run, bumping into Brandon/Ryan/Troy/Rory & Lary & Gary, all of them decide to stick together, only Lauren/Lisa decide not to stick with them, hoping to use them as a diversion. Kate & Anne move up forth only to spot Hunter Scott and runs back to the group.

Lisa & Lauren spotting T-Bo, runs off, meeting up with Gary/Lary, managing to run off while Kate & Anne are sandwiched in between Hunter T-Bo and Hunter Vasquez as Anne uses her freeze ray to freeze Hunter T-Bo as they both used their invisibility glasses to evade Hunter Vasquez. Despite having their glasses still active, Kate & Anne, spotting Hunter Scott splits up as Anne bumps into Troy/Rory as the first exit point clue, "Ain't life grand?". who decide to guard her as they tried to get her back to her twin.

A buy-out offer is given as Lisa, Lauren and Anne try to call in as Anne is successful, releasing Hunter Icey directly afterwards. Brandon & Ryan, Rory & Troy bump into each other only to run into Hunter Vasquez, after a mild chase, they run into Hunter Icey and decide to run back to the direction of Hunter Vasquez, leading to Rory to use his freeze ray on him as they get away. Lauren & Lisa then run into Hunter T-Bo, leading to Lisa freezing him as they run pass him. As Troy/Rory run pass the traffic light, Ryan is unable to catch up as Brandon slowed down. After trying to catch-up, Brandon/Ryan spot Hunter T-Bo and decide not to catch-up.

The final mission is then revealed, each runner must go to a location marked X on their map. On their way there, Lary & Gary decide to run pass Hunter Wong, leading to a short chase before Gary froze Wong. As Kate made it first to the maze, she is told that to earn the deflector, and she is told she has to move a ring pass an electric maze, and for every time she touches the side of the maze, an alarm is sounded, each time with a higher volume. Despite ringing the alarm on several attempts, Kate, Lary and Gary manages to get out of the location in time as Lisa & Lauren turn up, only to find out the station they were at was out of deflectors.

Trying to get back to Grand, Brandon & Ryan bump into Icey, deciding to "juke" her instead of using their freeze rays. After almost being caught, Brandon & Ryan evade Icey, only to end up freezing Vasquez. Finally, Hunter Amazon was released. Brandon & Ryan soon bump into Troy & Rory as they decide to stick till the last 7 minutes. It is than revealed that co-ordinates A & D will be sealed off, and whoever stuck inside will be eliminated immediately. Kate panics, but eventually gets to the safe zone. Lisa & Lauren then notices Hunter Amazon directly across the street, leaving Lisa to freeze her in time.

With the last few seconds before the board is closed, Lary & Gary bump into a red light, causing them to be disqualified. Kate runs into Hunter T-Bo, freezing him. Directly after, the exit point is revealed as everyone makes a frantic dash to the finish line, which was the starting point at Pershing Square. Lisa runs pass the tape first with her twin Lauren running past a few second later, as Kate cross the finish a few seconds later.

This is the only episode in which nobody was captured by a Hunter.
