= Lawrence Witmer =

American paleontologist

Lawrence M. Witmer (born October 10, 1959, at Rochester, New York) is an American paleontologist and paleobiologist. He is a Professor of Anatomy and a Chang Ying-Chien Professor of Paleontology at the Department of Biomedical Sciences at the Heritage College of Osteopathic Medicine in Ohio University. Witmer is considered to be one of the world's foremost experts on soft-tissue anatomy of the skull in extinct animals such as dinosaurs and pterosaurs. One of Witmer's largest contributions to vertebrate paleontology was the creation of the extant phylogenetic bracket approach to ancestral character state reconstruction. This methodology incorporates extensive comparative anatomy using physical and digital dissections of extant (not extinct) animals.

He appeared in TV shows such as the Triumph of the Beasts featurette for Walking with Beasts, Jurassic Fight Club (History Channel, 2008), Clash of the Dinosaurs (Discovery Channel, 2009), and Bizarre Dinosaurs (National Geographic Channel, 2009), among others.

Witmer wrote the 1995 book The Search for the Origin of Birds (ISBN 0-5311-1232-2).
