= New Line Television =

Television production company and subsidiary of New Line Cinema

- Type: Division
- Industry: Television production
- Founded: 1988; 38 years ago in New York City, United States
- Defunct: 2008; 18 years ago
- Fate: Folded into Warner Bros. Television
- Successor: Warner Bros. Television (2008–present)
- Headquarters: Burbank, California, United States
- Parent: New Line Cinema

New Line Television was the television production arm of the film studio of the same name. It was active for about 20 years from 1988 to 2008, when it was folded into Warner Bros. Television.

== History ==
The company was founded in 1988 to produce Freddy's Nightmares, a television series based on the studio's Nightmare on Elm Street film series. Following the series's cancellation in 1990, New Line Cinema launched its own television unit a year later. (Note: Freddy's Nightmares was distributed in syndication by Lorimar-Telepictures from 1988–1989. Warner Bros. purchased Lorimar-Telepictures in 1989 and assumed distribution for the remainder of the series's run.)

In 1990, New Line bought a majority stake in Robert Halmi, Inc. Entertainment, a production company specializing in Television films and miniseries. RHI was sold to Hallmark Cards in 1994, shortly after New Line had been acquired by Turner Broadcasting System. New Line once had a television distribution shop, New Line Television Distribution, which was previously affiliated with RHI. On October 21, 1992, New Line and RHI was in negotiations to handle management of RHI catalog product.

On February 15, 1999, producer Trilogy Entertainment Group had signed an exclusive development deal with the studio to produce television projects, mostly for syndication, cable and the networks. On April 28, 2000, it was announced that Matthew Blackheart: Monster Smasher, a program New Line is planning on to debut for syndication would debut instead on the Sci-Fi Channel, eventually making it into a made-for-TV movie.

Turner Broadcasting System merged with Time Warner on October 10, 1996. On June 16, 2000, New Line Television signed an affiliation production contract with Warner Bros. Television to produce network series for a two-year period. From October 2006, MGM Television began distributing New Line's films and television series.

On February 28, 2008, New Line Cinema was merged with Warner Bros. and hence ceased to exist as a separate entity. In turn, New Line Television was folded into Warner Bros.'s television division.

Warner Bros. Television would later revive the New Line brand in 2016 as a speciality producer for new and upcoming television adaptations based on New Line’s forte.

== Television series produced ==
Title	Years	Network	Notes
Freddy's Nightmares	1988–1990	Syndication	with Stone Television; Based on the 1984 film A Nightmare on Elm Street and its sequels by New Line Cinema
Court TV: Inside America's Courts	1993–1997	Syndication	with Court TV
The Mask: Animated Series	1995–1997	CBS	with Film Roman, Dark Horse Entertainment and Sunbow Entertainment; Based on the 1994 film The Mask by New Line Cinema
Dumb & Dumber	1995	ABC	with Hanna-Barbera Productions; Based on the 1994 film Dumb and Dumber by New Line Cinema
Mortal Kombat: Defenders of the Realm	1996	USA Network	with Film Roman, Threshold Entertainment and USA Studios; Based on the 1995 film Mortal Kombat by New Line Cinema
Mortal Kombat: Konquest	1998–1999	Syndication	with Threshold Entertainment; Based on the 1995 film Mortal Kombat by New Line Cinema
Breaking News	2002	Bravo	with Trilogy Entertainment Group
The Twilight Zone	2002–2003	UPN	with Spirit Dance Entertainment, Trilogy Entertainment Group and Joshmax Production Services
Masterminds	2003–2007	History Television	with Red Apple Entertainment
Amish in the City	2004	UPN	with Stick Figure Productions
Kitchen Confidential	2005	Fox	with Hemingson Entertainment, Darren Star Productions and 20th Century Fox Television
Blade: The Series	2006	Spike	with Phantom Four Films and Marvel Entertainment; Based on the 1998 film Blade and its sequels by New Line Cinema
The Real Wedding Crashers	2007	NBC	with Katalyst Films
Friday: The Animated Series	2007	MTV2	with Cubevision and MTV Animation; Based on the 1995 film Friday and its sequels by New Line Cinema
High School Confidential	2008	WE tv	with Herizon Productions
Family Foreman	2008	TV Land	
Poison Ivy: The Secret Society	2008	Lifetime	with Hush Productions Inc. and Insight Film Studios; Film made for TV

== Television distribution series ==
- The Lost World (1999–2002)
