= Estate of Panic =

- Directed by: J. Rupert Thompson
- Presented by: Steve Valentine
- Country of origin: United States
- No. of seasons: 1
- No. of episodes: 6

Production
- Running time: 60 minutes

Original release
- Network: Sci-Fi Channel
- Release: November 12 – December 17, 2008

Related
- Fear Factor, The Crystal Maze

Estate of Panic is an American reality competition show in which seven strangers compete to find cash in a large estate. The show is hosted by Steve Valentine, and produced by Endemol USA.

The first and only season aired on the Sci-Fi Channel from November 12 to December 17, 2008, around the same time as another reality competition series, Chase. The series has also aired on USA Network and Chiller.

== Premise ==
Seven strangers from across the United States arrive at a large, mysterious mansion. The mansion's eccentric owner (Steve Valentine) spends his free time stashing his assets throughout the mansion, and he is assisted by his silent butler, the eighty-year-old maniacal freak, Rupert. Once the players arrive at the estate, The owner challenges them to find the cash he has hidden in a series of rooms. The task is made difficult, however, as the contestants must come face to face with their greatest phobias while in the house. In each room, the last person to leave and the person who collects the least money are both eliminated. After three rooms are explored and six players have been eliminated, the final contestant earns the opportunity to win (and add to) everything collected by all players by completing a final challenge in the estate's Vault.

== Gameplay ==
=== Main game ===
The game is similar in concept to several other shows such as Fear Factor (also produced by Endemol), the Nickelodeon game show Finders Keepers, the French game show Fort Boyard, the British game show The Crystal Maze, and the GSN game show How Much Is Enough? The seven contestants search through a series of three rooms for cash. Bills of smaller denominations ($1, $5, etc.) are hidden in relatively easy locations in the rooms, or even placed out in plain sight; bills of larger denominations (up to $100) are hidden in areas that are either more difficult to reach or protected by various animals (snakes, crabs, spiders, maggots, insects, etc.), all of which are harmless, yet disturbing. Meanwhile, each room takes on a life of its own to make things trickier and scarier for the contestants. For example, the basement floods with water; the study has moving walls and ceiling that "shrink" the room to a very small size; the floor in the kitchen has properties similar to quicksand, and the garden is rigged with electric fences.

Once a contestant believes that he or she has enough money to secure a spot in the next round, the player must leave the room and place all cash collected on a tray held by Rupert. Not all exits remain open the entire time, however, and a contestant might either have to wait for an exit to unlock or take an alternate route to make it out of the room in time.

==== Elimination ====
While there is no explicitly-stated time limit in any of the rooms, the rooms become more uninhabitable as time passes and the number of players shrinks, forcing the players to consider when to exit. In each round, the last player left in the room is eliminated; the show claims that the contestant is "trapped" inside once all the others have exited. In addition: of the contestants who did exit, the one who recovered the least money is also eliminated and escorted from the house by the butler. Should there be a tie for last place, both players advance, but the two players with the least money in the next room are eliminated in addition to the trapped player.

There is no reward for recovering the most money in the first room, but the person who does so in the second room usually receives assistance that may prove useful in the third room. The total money recovered by all eliminated contestants is placed in a cumulative pot, which is then offered as a prize to the last remaining contestant.

==== Extras ====
At times, a monetary bonus is offered to a contestant who can retrieve a certain object or set of objects hidden in one of the rooms. Depending on the object, it could either help or hinder the player's actual progress in the room: carrying some objects around could impede the player's progress, while setting them down would put them at risk of being stolen. Other hidden objects could be worn to protect the player against some unwanted distraction(s) in the room (i.e. rubber-soled slippers, to protect against electric shocks).

=== The Vault ===
The last remaining contestant is given the chance to win all the money recovered by all seven contestants, plus more, in the Vault.

The contestant is restrained (such as by a leg chain, a harness suspended from the ceiling, or a straitjacket) in a vault containing 200 "safety deposit boxes." Some boxes contain cash, while others have worthless items or booby traps such as snakes; a few boxes contain tools the contestant can use to free himself from the restraint.

Unlike the previous rooms, the Vault features a time limit: ten steel balls roll at intervals through a "timing device." Once eight balls have finished dropping, red lights begin flashing to warn the contestant; when all ten have finished dropping, the door locks. If the contestant exits the Vault before the door locks, he or she wins all the money collected that night, plus any money recovered from the Vault. If the door locks, he/she loses all of the money.

As a last resort, the contestant can choose to "panic," pressing a button in the corner of the vault to summon Valentine to the rescue. Alternatively, if the contestant cannot physically reach the button, he/she may shout out, "I'm panicking," to the same effect; in earlier episodes, Valentine told the contestant to do both. A contestant who panics forfeits any money collected in the vault as well as half of the money collected in the first three rooms.

If the contestant makes it out of the Vault, (regardless if they completed or forfeited by "panicking"), The host will state the final amount of prize money the contestant is leaving with, before ordering them to leave with the catchphrase of "Get out of my house". The winning contestant then leaves the mansion and is escorted away from the estate via car.

== Production ==
Estate of Panic is filmed on an estate in Argentina, although some challenges are filmed in a studio because, according to Valentine, "the scope of the challenges is so ambitious and huge that there were times when we couldn't really destroy that person's house." A disclaimer at the end of each episode notes that only one challenge is filmed per day, and the complete show is filmed over the course of four days.

== International versions ==
Country	Name	Host	Network	Date premiered	Prize
Brazil	Jogo Duro	Paulo Vilhena	Rede Globo	June 7, 2009 – July 27, 2009	R$30.000
Ukraine	Замок страху	Sergei Siplivyi	Novyi Kanal	March 5, 2011 – June 30, 2011	₴5.000.000

== Episodes ==
Episode Title	Contestants	Summary
1. Get Out of My House	Chad, Debbie, Eben, Jessica, Jill, Lee, Zondra	Room 1: A basement that floods from a never-ending torrent from "busted" pipes; snakes. Last in room: Jill; Bottom two: Debbie and Zondra; Least money: Debbie Room 2: A garden surrounded with electric wires, the shocks of which grew in intensity as time went on. Players also could not wear socks or shoes during this round. Last in room: Jessica; Bottom two: Eben and Zondra; Least money: Eben; Most money: Chad Room 3: A study constructed to have its walls and ceiling close in, crushing furniture as the space in the room grew smaller. For winning the previous round, Chad won a screwdriver, which could be used to remove the vent covers, which concealed more money, but he simply used his hands. Last in room: Lee; Least money: Zondra; Winner: Chad Vault: Chad had one leg shackled to a chain on the floor that limited his range of movement to just short of the door. He had to either find a key or use some of the tools available in the safe deposit boxes to cut himself free; he found a saw, a wrench, and a crowbar, and used the crowbar to break the wooden pedestal off the floor. Chad escaped the vault, winning $28,511 for the evening.
2. That Sinking Feeling	Adrienne, Cassandra, Deanne, Joey, Royce, Serena, Ted	Room 1: A crawl space containing snakes and tarantulas in some straw. Also hidden in the crawl space were two halves of a painting (which Valentine claimed was a painting of Rupert's parents). Only one player could bring it out, and needed both halves; the player bringing out both halves of the painting won a $1,000 bonus towards his or her score for the room. Last in room: Serena; Bottom two: Adrienne and Cassandra; Least money: Cassandra; Bonus: Deanne (won another half of the painting with a quick rock, paper, scissors contest.) Room 2: A kitchen containing maggoty food. The floor was actually a non-Newtonian fluid into which the contestants would sink if they did not move quickly. Last in room: Deanne; Bottom two: Adrienne and Ted; Least money: Adrienne; Most money: Royce Room 3: The sewers underneath the mansion. Some routes contained dead ends. For winning the previous round, Royce was allowed to wear rubber gloves on his hands. Last in room: Joey; Least money: Ted; Winner: Royce Vault: Royce was suspended from the ceiling with his feet just barely touching the ground. He either had to find cutting tools to cut himself down or find a way to grab a loop above his head to be freed instantly. Royce escaped the vault, winning $26,849 for the evening.
3. Shocked and Dismayed	Andy, Brian, Chris, David, Kristen, Miriam, Nikki	Room 1: An electrical room covered in a web of shock wires, similar to the garden in the first episode; halfway through, the lights would periodically go out, further distracting the players and preventing them from seeing the wires. Also hidden in the room was a pair of slippers; only one player could bring them out, and could also wear them to lessen the effect of the electrical shocks; the player bringing out both slippers won a $1,000 bonus towards his or her score for the room. Last in room: Brian; Bottom two: Kristen and Nikki; Least money: Kristen; Bonus: David Room 2: A wine cellar with spikes that appeared out of the wall and snakes in the barrels; eventually the walls themselves closed in on the contestants. Last in room: Chris; Bottom two: Miriam and Andy; Least money: Miriam; Most money: David Room 3: A refrigerated room filled with ice blocks, ice sculptures, and a deep freeze containing ice cream novelties with cash hidden inside of them. Halfway through the round it began to snow; money also fell with the snow. For winning the previous round, David was allowed to wear gloves on his hands. Last in room: Nikki; Least money: Andy; Winner: David Vault: David's leg was chained to the floor as in the first episode, but his arms were also handcuffed to long chains extending from two of the deposit boxes. He had to free himself from the floor with hidden tools and also find the key to unshackle himself from the cuffs. David could not set himself free from the ankle chain and panicked, winning just under $13,000 of the near $26,000 found that evening.
4. A Raw Deal	Adrian, Chioma, Chris, Courtney, Michael, Ron, Sharon	Room 1: A trash compactor filled with garbage and worms, among which the cash was buried. As the round progressed, a garbage chute spewed more sludge as well as money; the compactor was also activated at points to close the walls in on the contestants. In addition, a mask was buried in the trash; the contestant who found it earned an additional $1,000. Last in room:Courtney; Bottom two: Chioma and Ron; Least money: Ron; Bonus: Adrian (keeps it secret by hiding it and asking if anyone saw it.) Room 2: A meat locker shielded in total darkness (though the audience is able to see, thanks to infrared cameras), with rotten fruit and more garbage strewn across the floor; halfway through, the lights came on briefly, giving the contestants a glimpse into what they were actually touching. The carcasses and garbage concealed money, as well as things cut to feel like money to fool the contestants, such as lettuce, newspaper, and other paper products; there were also dummy "carcasses" containing bricks instead of money to further confuse the players. Last in room: Sharon; Bottom two: Chris and Chioma; Least money: Chris; Most money: Adrian Room 3: A series of giant gopher holes forming a maze of tunnels; as the contestants ventured through the space, additional dirt (as well as money) fell from the ceiling and piled up on and around the contestants. For winning the previous round, Adrian was given knee pads to make it easier to maneuver throughout the tunnels. Last in room: Chioma; Least money: Adrian; Winner: Michael Vault: Michael was shackled to the floor; however this time the key to get out was located in a safe next to him. The safe was held shut by a combination lock, the combination numbers of which were hidden in three separate deposit boxes in the room. Michael had to retrieve the numbers, place them in the correct order, and unlock the lock to obtain the key to unshackle himself. Michael escaped, earning $31,181 for the night.
5. Don't Burst My Bubble	Alex, Bonnie, James, Jenileigh, Jordan, Maya, Nancy	Room 1: Egyptian-themed room filled with artifacts and sarcophagi containing cash, as well as insects, tarantulas, scorpions, and "water snakes". Once underway, sand began pouring from the ceiling, burying the money and making it harder for the contestants to move about. There are also rubies hidden in the room, which were worth $200 each if found. No other gems would generate bonus money, as shown when Bonnie brought a count out of the room. Last in room: Alex; Bottom two: Bonnie, Maya; Least money: Tied; both Bonnie and Maya advanced. Room 2: "Steve's childhood bedroom" filled with toys, balloons and party favors. Giant balloons on the wall filled with air and exploded at random times, spreading confetti and cash all over the room. For that reason, players were given safety glasses for this room. Last in room: Jordan; Bottom three: Bonnie, Maya, Nancy; Least money: Maya, Nancy; Most money: Jenileigh Room 3: The three contestants were put into the storm drains, a maze of pipes with many dead ends. In addition, it was raining, causing large amounts of water to flow through the drain at random times. For winning the previous round, Jenileigh was given a plastic bag, which she used as additional storage space for her money. Last in room: Bonnie; Least money: Jenileigh; Winner: James Vault: All of the winnings from the evening were placed inside a safe in the vault, while James was tied to a chair in the middle of the room; he had to cut himself free from the chair, find the combination to open the safe, place the night's winnings and any other money he found back into the bag they were kept in (which was also left in the room), and escape. The combination to the safe was the number of jewels inside each of three numbered velvet bags hidden in the Vault (each bag was numbered, so the number of jewels in the bag labeled #1 would be the first number in the combination, etc.); the jewels themselves were worth $50 each if they were brought out along with the money. The combination was shown to be 46-15-82, for a total of 143 jewels, thus $7,150. James escaped the vault, winning $36,652 for the evening.
6. A Grave Situation	Chris, Janet, JoAnn, Kaleti, Milo, Ruby, Tenille	Room 1: The estate's attic, which was cluttered with old knick-knacks, cobwebs, and tarantulas. Also in the attic was a hidden compartment that contained cash but also featured a door that closed behind the contestant, trapping him inside until a good amount of force was used to open the door. Inside the room was an urn worth a $1,000 bonus to the person that found it. Last in room: Tenille; Bottom two: Janet, Ruby; Least money: Ruby; Bonus: Chris Room 2: A trophy room, which partway through the round began flooding with mud that spewed from behind the room's pictures and from some of the mounted animal heads. Some of the treasure boxes in the room contained large snakes; others required keys to open, which were hung in giant clusters on the wall. Unlike previous episodes, the special advantage was not given to the player that collected the most money in the round; instead, it was given to the contestant who found a "guardian angel" statue hidden in the room. Last in room: Kaleti; Bottom two: JoAnn and Janet were called out, but neither had the least money. Least money: Chris; Bonus: Milo Room 3: The estate's graveyard, which contained coffins in various states of burial, some filled with crabs and/or garbage; a mausoleum filled with money; one particularly deep coffin that could be used to trap the player(s) who went for its contents (Milo entered and was trapped by JoAnn, but forced his way out); and guard dogs to intimidate the players. For finding the hidden bonus in the previous round, Milo received a 10-second head start. Last in room: Janet; Least money: JoAnn; Winner: Milo Vault: Milo was locked inside a straitjacket with only one hand (and very little arm movement) available to open doors. Milo had to find the key located in one of the deposit boxes and free himself from the straitjacket before escaping the vault. Milo escaped, winning $26,095 for the evening.

== Reaction ==
Brian Lowry in Variety praised host Valentine's "macabre charm" but stated the show overall is a "parade of silly stunts and contests" which becomes "mostly an ordeal for viewers."
