= Jurassic Fight Club =

2008 American TV series

- Cover of the original US DVD release
- Narrated by: Erik Thompson
- Country of origin: United States
- No. of seasons: 1
- No. of episodes: 12

Production
- Running time: 45 minutes

Original release
- Network: History Channel
- Release: July 29 – October 22, 2008

Jurassic Fight Club (titled Dinosaur Secrets in Australia and the United Kingdom) is a paleontology-based television miniseries that premiered in the United States in July 2008 on the History Channel. Jurassic Fight Club was hosted by George Blasing, a self-taught paleontologist, and also features well-known paleontologists such as Thomas R. Holtz Jr., Philip J. Currie, Lawrence Witmer, and others. The show ran for one season of 12 episodes and was not renewed.

== Summary ==
Scientists study the battles of prehistoric creatures, such as dinosaurs, before they became extinct. Each episode features a forensic-styled breakdown of a prehistoric battle. Based on fossil evidence and paleontologic analysis, a computer-generated imagery rendering of the battle, based on the evidence and the imagination of George Blasing (the show's host) is the final act of each episode. In most cases, the battles are based on actual fossil finds, although in several episodes, scientists simply put two contemporaneous prehistoric animals, against each other. It is the second most-watched show on paleontology beaten only by Walking with Dinosaurs, has been quite controversial but has become very popular, for various show reasons.

== Episodes ==
No.	Title	Featuring	Original Air Date	Location and time period
1	"Cannibal Dinosaur"	Male Majungasaurus vs. Female Majungasaurus	29 July 2008	Maevarano Formation, Madagascar, Late Cretaceous (70 mya)
A male Majungasaurus is on the prowl for a mate. He picks up the scent of a female and follows it until she finds her. He uses a courtship display to try and woo her, but she aggressively rejects his advances. Confused, the male soon realizes the female already has a baby and tries to kill it so he can mate with her. They fight fiercely until the female trips on a log. The male seizes the opportunity to grab the baby and kills it. After a brief moment, the female charges him and crushes his neck with a powerful bite. The male drops the baby as he slumps to the ground, paralyzed. Upon realizing that her baby is dead, the female eats both the baby and the male to replenish her energy.
2	"T-Rex Hunter"	Tyrannosaurus vs. Nanotyrannus	5 August 2008	Hell Creek Formation, South Dakota, Late Cretaceous (65 mya)
A pair of adult T. rex leave their babies unguarded to go hunting. They leave a series of scent marks that repel most predators, but the pungent scent attracts a Nanotyrannus, which kills a juvenile Tyrannosaurus to eliminate future competition. A battle ensues, and the Nanotyrannus throws one juvenile T. rex to the ground, seemingly dead. But as the Nanotyrannus faces the second juvenile, the first one bites it on the leg. The retaliating juvenile is quickly killed as the Nanotyrannus snaps its neck. He prepares to kill the remaining juvenile, but the mother Tyrannosaurus returns, having been alerted by the cries of her young. After a brief duel, the mother kills the Nanotyrannus and tears its corpse apart as a warning to others of its kind that may threaten her offspring.
3	"Gang Killers"	Deinonychus vs. Tenontosaurus	12 August 2008	Cloverly Formation, Montana, Early Cretaceous (115 mya)
A pack of nine Deinonychus ambushes a migrating herd of Tenontosaurus, separating the weakest member. They viciously tear into their prey, but he fights back and kills two Deinonychus. The Deinonychus then retreat, following the ornithopod's blood trail as it looks for cover. At night, the pack finds the Tenontosaurus and moves in for the final assault. As he fights for his life, the Tenontosaurus kills four more Deinonychus, but eventually loses consciousness and falls to the ground. The alpha male raptor crushes its windpipe while two remaining raptors begin feasting on the internal organs. They fight for the best parts of the carcass until the alpha pushes his rivals away and begins to taste the morsels.
4	"Bloodiest Battle"	Allosaurus vs. Ceratosaurus vs. Stegosaurus vs. Camarasaurus	19 August 2008	Cleveland-Lloyd Dinosaur Quarry, Utah, Late Jurassic (150 mya)
Set in the Morrison Formation, a mother Stegosaurus and her baby approach a lake to drink, but they get stuck in the mud. Their struggling attracts a Ceratosaurus, who eats the baby Stegosaurus alive. The smell of blood attracts a trio of Allosaurus, who kill the distracted Ceratosaurus. The pack goes after the adult Stegosaurus, but she kills one of them with her spiked tail. Meanwhile, a large bull Camarasaurus approaches the lake and gets stuck too. The two remaining Allosaurus decide to attack him instead. The Camarasaurus swings his tail into one of the Allosaurus, killing it nearly instantly. The momentum temporarily frees the sauropod's front legs, allowing him to rear up and crush the last surviving Allosaurus. The two remaining dinosaurs die a slow, painful death.
5	"Deep Sea Killers"	Megalodon vs. Brygmophyseter	26 August 2008	Northern Pacific Ocean (off Japan), Miocene (15 mya)
A megalodon hunts in the dark Pacific waters north of Neogene Japan. It senses a lone Brygmophyseter, separated from its pod. The great shark ambushes the cetacean, severs its caudal fins, and bites deep into its tail. Unable to swim, the badly injured whale uses echolocation to call its pod for help. Picking up the signal, the pod rallies to rescue their imperiled member. The whales use their superior numbers and sonar to overwhelm the megalodon. When they determine the shark is no longer a threat, the Brygmophyseter return to their injured member. After trying and failing to revive him, the pod leaves and sings a sad death song for their fallen member. The megalodon hears the song and later returns to feed on the now-dead whale.
6	"Hunter Becomes Hunted"	Allosaurus vs. Ceratosaurus	2 September 2008	Garden Park, Colorado, Late Jurassic (150 mya)
Set in the Morrison, a mated pair of Ceratosaurus venture into unfamiliar territory to find prime hunting grounds. Unbeknownst to them, it belongs to an Allosaurus. The female Ceratosaurus hides in a dense grove of trees while her mate chases prey towards her position. As she prepares to spring, the Allosaurus swiftly ambushes and kills her. The male Ceratosaurus reaches the ambush spot, but instead of his mate, he sees the Allosaurus closing in. The male fights back by slashing at the Allosaurus's face with his sharp claws and biting its back. The Allosaurus snatches the Ceratosaurus and breaks his back by slamming him into a tree. Using the enormous foot claws on its feet, the Allosaurus disembowels its helpless prey and roars in victory.
7	"Biggest Killers"	Allosaurus, Utahraptor, Majungasaurus, Albertosaurus and Tyrannosaurus	9 September 2008	Numerous places and times
Allosaurus, Utahraptor, Majungasaurus, Albertosaurus and Tyrannosaurus are compared to find out which was the most dangerous. It also presents a message that humanity will disappear like these predators.
8	"Raptor's Last Stand"	Utahraptor vs. Gastonia	16 September 2008	Yellow Cat Member, Utah, Early Cretaceous (125 mya)
Set in the Cedar Mountain Formation during a drought, a Gastonia searches for water. A scavenging Utahraptor notices the herbivore and prepares to ambush it—small pterosaurs atop its spiked back alert the Gastonia, who shifts sideways towards its attacker. The Utahraptor leaps over the Gastonia and sinks its deadly claws into its soft underbelly. The Utahraptor attacks again, but the Gastonia does not fall for the same trick. The Utahraptor falls, and the Gastonia continues its search for water. But then the Utahraptor bites the ankylosaur's front leg. The Gastonia counterattacks, grabbing the raptor's leg with a pair of spikes on its tail. The Utahraptor breaks free and retreats, but before it can, the Gastonia inflicts several cuts along its side. The Utahraptor survives the battle, but ultimately both succumb to the drought.
9	"Ice Age Monsters"	Short-faced bear vs. American lion	23 September 2008	Natural Trap Cave, Wyoming, Late Pleistocene (10 ka)
An Arctodus and an American lion fight over a bison the feline killed. The fight is not only for food but also to eliminate competition as climate change makes resources scarce. The enormous bear roars to scare the lion, but the lion knocks it down and sinks its sharp teeth into the short-faced bear's back. However, the bear's thick, fat-covered skin prevents it from inflicting significant damage. After shaking off the American lion, the short-faced bear strikes it on the head and bites its stomach. The Arctodus begins devouring the bison, but the American lion rises and launches a surprise attack. It tries to bite the bear's windpipe, but the short-faced bear evades it with its powerful limbs. Finally, the great lion bites the bear in the windpipe. However, the Arctodus reacts before the American lion can kill it, throwing it into a cave, where the lion dies.
10	"River of Death"	Pachyrhinosaurus vs. Albertosaurus	30 September 2008	Wapiti Formation, Alberta, Late Cretaceous (70 mya)
In Pipestone Creek, a pair of Albertosaurus charge at a herd of Pachyrhinosaurus. The herd stampedes towards a raging riverbed, and the predators corner the prey, although one breaks free. One Albertosaurus chases it into a clearing and attempts to kill the Pachyrhinosaurus, knocking it on its side. However, the Pachyrhinosaurus gets back on its feet and gores the tyrannosaurid in the leg, enraging it instead of crippling it. The Albertosaurus then bites down on its neck, flips the herbivore over, and tears at its underbelly. Back at the river, the other Albertosaurus backs the Pachyrhinosaurus herd into the river. They all drown because they are too tightly packed to swim properly, and the Albertosaurus later finds the carcasses further downriver and begins to feast.
11	"Raptors vs. T-Rex"	Edmontosaurus vs. Dromaeosaurus vs. Tyrannosaurus	7 October 2008	Hell Creek Formation, South Dakota, Late Cretaceous (65 mya)
A lone Edmontosaurus looks for a herd to live in but instead wanders into the territory of a pack of Dromaeosaurus. They attack the Edmontosaurus with their claws, but the herbivore's hide is too thick to do any damage, and he shakes off his attackers. The Edmontosaurus crushes one with his front feet and throws another into a fallen tree; however, the raptors keep attacking. Even with one or two pack members killed, they manage to bring down the herbivore. But just as they start feasting on the carcass, a Tyrannosaurus rex, drawn by the noise, comes over and steals the dead Edmontosaurus, leaving the Dromaeosaurus pack with just the tail, which it bit off to lighten the corpse.
12	"Armageddon"	(Numerous species)	22 October 2008	Numerous places, Late Cretaceous (65 mya)
During the Cretaceous–Paleogene extinction event, a giant asteroid struck the coast of the Yucatán Peninsula. This produced the Chicxulub crater and a shower of meteorites, along with a deadly cloud of gas that spread across the planet and killed the dinosaurs. Most dinosaurs (including the Tyrannosaurus rex family, the female Majungasaurus, the Albertosaurus group, Nanotyrannus, the Dromaeosaurus gang, the Edmontosaurus herd, and Pachyrhinosaurus) witnessed the impact. They tried to escape, with many dying in the series of impacts and from the cloud of gas and dust. Soon, dinosaurs like the well-known Tyrannosaurus fell, and humans and other mammals replaced them as Earth's dominant species.

== Scientific errors ==
Nearly all dinosaur media contains several scientific errors or outdated facts. However, Jurassic Fight Club has been among the most widely criticized because many of them were known at the time. Still, some errors result from discoveries made since the show's 2007/early 2008 production.

The most common errors include:

- All of the animals unrealistically make as much noise as possible, even if there is no reason for it.
- Many of the dinosaurs are shrink-wrapped, which no animal today looks like unless it is starving to death.
- All theropods have pronated hands facing backwards, even the Abelisaurids.
- All raptors either have no feathers or very sparse feathers, despite evidence showing they have had feathers since the late 1990s.
- All of the quadrupedal herbivores' feet are more elephantine than they probably were in life.
- Many of the creatures behave irregularly. All the carnivores are unnaturally persistent, not giving up even when they are horribly injured. The herbivores do not fight back as much as they reasonably would and almost let the carnivores kill them, especially Tenontosaurus and Edmontosaurus.
- Likely, dinosaurs did not produce mammalian roaring sounds; rather, most large dinosaurs emitted low, ominous rumbles.
- All the carnivores are said to have insatiable appetites. Though this is not true, since modern predators have shown they actually spend very little of their time hunting, the carnivores shown would likely behave similarly.

== Turf Wars ==
The Jurassic Fight Club game, Turf Wars was a fighting game that could be found on history.com but is no longer available. You could play as one of six dinosaurs, skills are used to defeat the other five. Cheat codes can make players invincible, access special attacks, etc. These dinosaurs are featured in battle order with their own status:

Dinosaur	Offense	Defense	Speed
Female Majungasaurus	4	7	8
Male Majungasaurus	5	8	4
Tyrannosaurus	10	9	8
Stegosaurus	9	10	4
Utahraptor	10	8	6
Pachyrhinosaurus	8	8	8
