= High School Confidential (TV series) =

- Created by: Sharon Liese
- Starring: Lauren, Sara N, Crystle, Courtney, Cappie, Jessi, Beth, Lauren B, Cate, Kim, Allyson, Sarah T
- Country of origin: United States
- Original language: English
- No. of seasons: 1
- No. of episodes: 8

Production
- Running time: 40–45 minutes
- Production company: New Line Television

Original release
- Network: We TV
- Release: March 10 – April 28, 2008

High School Confidential is an eight-part documentary television series created by Sharon Liese, following twelve high school teenagers from Blue Valley Northwest High. The series premiered on We TV on March 10, 2008, and concluded its run on April 28, 2008.
