= DEA (2008 TV series) =

American reality television series

- Genre: Reality
- Narrated by: Lance Henriksen
- Country of origin: United States
- Original language: English
- No. of seasons: 2
- No. of episodes: 15

Production
- Production locations: Detroit, Michigan (Season 1); New York and New Jersey (Season 2)
- Running time: 42 minutes
- Production companies: Al Roker Entertainment; Size 12 Productions

Original release
- Network: Spike
- Release: April 2, 2008 – March 31, 2009

DEA is an American reality television series that ran for fifteen hour-long episodes in two seasons from April 2, 2008, to March 31, 2009, on the Spike television network. DEA follows the jobs of a squad of Drug Enforcement Administration special agents as they track down leads and make narcotics busts on houses suspected of selling, producing, or trafficking drugs. The first season was filmed in Detroit, Michigan, and consisted of six episodes aired from April 2, 2008, to May 7, 2008. The second season in the New York/New Jersey area consisted of nine episodes aired from February 10, 2009, to March 31, 2009, and follows a group of DEA agents and Task Force officers operating out of the DEA's northern New Jersey headquarters located in Newark. The show was produced for Spike TV by Al Roker Entertainment in association with Size 12 Productions.

The first season follows DEA Group 14, while the second season follows a team of agents known as "Group 5-6", based at the DEA Newark Field Division office at 80 Mulberry Street, Newark, New Jersey.

The series was narrated by Lance Henriksen.

== Episodes ==
=== Season 1 (2008) ===
No. overall	No. in season	Title	Original release date
1	1	"DEA vs. Heroin Kingpin"	April 2, 2008
2	2	"Deadly Chase"	April 9, 2008
3	3	"Operation Pill Grinder"	April 16, 2008
4	4	"Up the Ladder"	April 23, 2008
5	5	"Deep Cover"	April 30, 2008
6	6	"Marijuana Grow House"	May 7, 2008

=== Season 2 (2009) ===
No. overall	No. in season	Title	Original release date
7	1	"The Six Million Dollar Heroin Bust"	February 10, 2009
8	2	"DEA vs. the Juarez Cartel"	February 17, 2009
9	3	"Showdown With the Colombian Drug Cartel"	February 24, 2009
10	4	"The Million Dollar Money Drop"	March 3, 2009
11	5	"Flip the Stripper"	March 10, 2009
12	6	"Drug Dealing Deli"	March 17, 2009
13	7	"Two Million Dollar Dead Drop"	March 24, 2009
14	8	"The Undercover Cocaine Bust"	March 31, 2009
15	9	"Big Rig Meth Bust"	March 31, 2009

== Reception ==
A review of show's debut by The New York Times described the series as "an argument that the trend of shows about real people doing their jobs ought to be put out of its misery", while crediting the show as "an extended public service announcement".
