= Lend America =

American mortgage company

Ideal Mortgage Bankers
- Trade name: Lend America
- Industry: financial services
- Defunct: 2009
- Fate: Closed down after fraud
- Headquarters: Melville, New York, United States
- Area served: United States
- Key people: Michael Ashley (Executive Vice President found guilty of fraud)
- Services: Mortgages

Lend America was an American mortgage lending company based on Melville, New York that operated until it was closed in 2009. The company used cable television infomercials and toll-free numbers to promote its services which include refinancing of mortgages with fixed-rate loans guaranteed by the Federal Housing Administration.

Between 2008 and 2009, the company originated around 11,300 FHA-backed loans, ranking it No. 22 among FHA lenders by volume. Around three-quarters of those loans were refinances, and the default rates on the company's loans were between two and three times the national rate. The company's lending operation surged during this period due to the credit crunch and the housing crisis that eliminated private funding sources in the market. Lend America focused on FHA loans because it has less strict loan requirements compared to Fannie Mae and Freddie Mac. It was marred in controversy when US Government alleged that the company had falsely certified to Federal Housing Administration that borrowers met HUD’s lending requirements when the company knew they did not.

On December 1, 2009, after the company was removed from Federal Housing Administration program, it abruptly announced on its website that it was ceasing all lending operation.

== History ==
=== Paid Advertisement Controversy in New York City ===
On March 26, 2008, the company aired a half-hour paid advertisement on WNBC, the NBC owned-and-operated station in New York City. The station scrapped the airing of Access Hollywood for the airtime of the ad. Joe Avellar, a former reporter at the station who was later dropped by the station in 2006 and went to WCBS-AM in 2007 appeared in the ad.

Later on March 27, 2008, the station spokeswoman told the New York Daily News that the spot would not be seen again in the near future. Frank Comerford who was the general manager of the station, resigned on March 31, 2008 due to the controversy and was succeeded by Tom O' Brien a day after.

=== Complaint by the US government relating to practices of fraud ===
On October 20, 2009, The United States Attorney General filed a civil complaint against Lend America, seeking a court-ordered injunction to prevent the company from making loans insured by the Federal Housing Administration (“FHA”) and also seeking relief against Lend America’s Executive Vice President and Chief Business Strategist, Michael Ashley. The complaint alleges that Lend America falsely certified to HUD that borrowers who received over $14 million in loans met HUD’s lending requirements when, in fact, the company knew they did not. In addition, the complaint documents some 40 borrower examples where Lend America made up incomes or otherwise submitted fraudulent loans to the FHA.

In connection with the complaint, The United States Department of Housing and Urban Development's Mortgagee Review Board informed the company, that it has uncovered numerous violations of the Federal Housing Administration's (FHA) origination and underwriting requirements, including submitting false certifications and failing to document the borrower's income and creditworthiness. A court judgment was issued on March 3, 2010, permanently banning Lend America from the FHA and from doing business in the industry. It ended a five-month process that began when the Department of Housing and Urban Development's (HUD) Mortgagee Review Board declared that its parent company, Ideal Mortgage Bankers, committed 12 FHA violations, including origination and underwriting requirements.

=== Removal of Lend America from the FHA program and ceasing of the company's operation ===
On November 30, 2009 the Federal Housing Administration announced that it will no longer back any of Lend America's loans based on the company's failure to document borrower's income and creditworthiness. In connection with this action, FHA Commissioner David Stevens stated that "The evidence in this case points to a disturbing pattern of senior officials and underwriters, either not knowing what they were doing, or not caring."

On December 1, 2009, a day after the FHA announcement, Lend America abruptly announced that it was ceasing all lending operations. This closure is attributed to the fact that FHA lending constitutes 90 percent of Lend America's business.

=== Michael Ashley: Guilty plea and other controversies ===
In 1996, Michael Ashley, Lend America's Executive Vice President and Chief Business Strategist, pleaded guilty to two counts of wire fraud in connection with his work at "Liberty Mortgage", a company that was run by his family. His father, Kenneth Ashley, was sentenced to nearly four years in prison. Recalling the ordeal, Ashley stated: "I was just a pawn in a chess game between my father and the government...It doesn't affect my ability to do lending."

Pursuant to an October 20, 2009 Attorney General Civil Complaint, Ashley worked for numerous mortgage companies despite a State Banking Department ban. According to the complaint, Lend America listed Ashley as involved in "marketing," while his true function was to train the staff to originate FHA-backed mortgages and his pay was tied to the value of the loans the company made. Thus in the fiscal year that ended Sept. 30, 2008, when the company made $1.075 billion in loans, Ashley's compensation was $5.375 million.

Ashley frequently stars in Lend America's late night infomercials. In addition, Ashley, uses his car racing career to promote the company.

In July 2019 Mike Ashley, was sentenced to three years in federal prison for his role in the 2009 collapse of the $1 billion-a-year mortgage lender. In addition to the three-year prison sentence, Ashley was ordered by Judge Joseph Bianco to pay $49 million in restitution and forfeit $800,000.
