= Family Foreman =

- Genre: Reality
- Starring: George Foreman
- Country of origin: United States
- Original language: English
- No. of seasons: 1
- No. of episodes: 6

Production
- Camera setup: Multi-camera
- Running time: 22–24 minutes
- Production company: New Line Television

Original release
- Network: TV Land
- Release: July 16 – August 20, 2008

Family Foreman is an American reality television series starring former heavyweight boxing champion and "grillionaire" George Foreman and his family. The show premiered on TV Land on July 16, 2008, airing a total of six episodes produced by New Line Television. It is the last new series to be produced by New Line Television before it was folded into Warner Bros. Television.

== Synopsis ==
The series follows George Foreman and his family in their day-to-day lives.

== Episodes ==
No.	Title	Original release date
1	"Boxing"	July 16, 2008
George wants to make a boxing comeback and has already started training. Big Wheel comes home from college to celebrate Leola's birthday and unwittingly spills the beans about the comeback to Joan.
2	"Singing/Football"	July 23, 2008
Natalie wants to put off medical school for a singing career. She wants to be on Monk's new record label, but George has always wanted her to be a doctor. At the same time, Red wants to play high school football.
3	"IndyCar Race"	July 30, 2008
The family heads to a professional car race to check out the IndyCar team George just bought a stake in (Team Panther). Red aspires to be a driver while Natalie is asked to sing God Bless America in front of 80,000 people.
4	"Monk Gets Fired"	August 6, 2008
Monk and George have a week filled with appointments such as pitches from inventors, multiple deals, contract negotiations and more meetings. Monk's other client, sister Natalie, is booked to record her first record demo and Monk just can't seem to find the time.
5	"Ranch Visit"	August 13, 2008
The Foremans take their annual family trip to the ranch in Marshall, Texas. George gives the ranch hands the weekend off and his kids will have to do all of the work.
6	"George Buys a Ring"	August 20, 2008
Joan and George plan an intimate dinner, but George is late and misses the dinner. George goes shopping with Natalie to buy a ring for his wife to apologize.
