= Chase (2008 TV series) =

Television series

- A promotional desktop wallpaper featuring the series' logo and its eight "hunters". From left to right: Vazquez, Amazon, T-Bo, Icey, Kim, Grant, Scott, and Wong.
- Directed by: Hans van Riet
- Starring: Trey Farley
- Country of origin: United States
- Original language: English
- No. of seasons: 1
- No. of episodes: 6

Production
- Running time: 60 minutes
- Production companies: ABC Media Productions; Fuji Television

Original release
- Network: Sci Fi
- Release: November 11 – December 16, 2008

Chase (stylized as Cha$e) is a reality competition show. It aired on Sci Fi in the United States around the same time as Estate of Panic. It is based on the successful Japanese show Run for money: Tōsō-chū, also known as (Japanese: run for money 逃走中) which began airing on Fuji Television in June 2004. It was a mid-season replacement for the show Battlestar Galactica.

== Hunters ==
The hunters (who resemble stereotypical Men in Black) in the game are meant to capture the contestants, thus removing them from the game. They are:

Alias	Name	Gender	Height	Weight (lbs.)	BMI	Skill	Captures
Amazon	Amazon Beard	Female	5'5"	138	23.0	Speed Runner	7
Grant	Robert Grant	Male	6'0"	200	27.1	Sprinter	6
Icey	Berglind Icey	Female	5'11"	129	18.0	Endurance	1
Kim	Benjamin Kim	Male	5'9"	180	26.6	Speed Runner	5
Scott	Jilina Scott	Female	5'11"	135	18.8	Agility	3
T-Bo	Thibault Laporte	Male	5'7"	148	23.2	Parkour	2
Vazquez	RJ Vazquez	Male	5'9"	168	24.8	Jumper	3
Wong	James Wong	Male	6'0"	180	24.4	Stealth	3
Ricky Ortiz		Male	6'3"	248	30.2	Pro Wrestler	1

Former ECW wrestler Ricky Ortiz was a guest hunter on episode three, which aired November 25, 2008. Ortiz managed to get at least one capture.

Not all of the Hunters get to hunt; one Hunter is selected in some episodes to be a "Spotter", whose job is to drive around the game board in a special vehicle and locate the contestants for the other Hunters, relaying the contestants' position to the others, though they themselves are forbidden from making any captures. The Hunters are forced to ignore the camera crews, and are only allowed to break chase when they see a Runner. The Hunters do not communicate with any of the contestants, except for guest hunter Ortiz who mocked the contestants in his episode.

== General format ==
10 contestants are released onto a playing field (called a "game board" in the context of the show). They are set a series of challenges, called "missions," for which they may earn "utilities" (see below). All the while, they must avoid being tagged by the show's resident hunters, more of whom are introduced onto the board as the game progresses; if tagged by the hunter, the contestant is "captured" and eliminated from the game, without winning any money.

Contestants earn money by finding "money flags" around the game board, each of which is worth bonus money. Each flag is worth $1,000, and there are 25 flags, thus a total of $25,000 available to be found. However, only the one who reaches the "exit point," or finish line, is able to keep the bonus money that he or she has found.

During the game, additional twists may be introduced by the host, such as making it easier for hunters to find contestants for a period of time for failing a mission, offering an opportunity to accept a guaranteed sum of money in exchange for leaving the game, or declaring a certain area of the game board off-limits.

The missions given to contestants at various parts of the game allow the participants to acquire defensive devices to negate the attacks of a hunter(s). Once the host initiates the mission, the contestants have a certain amount of time to locate the area the item is stationed/hidden, and solve the puzzle in order to unlock/obtain it.

The game lasts a total of 60 minutes. Towards the end of that time, the host will reveal the location of an exit point. The first contestant to reach the exit point wins $25,000 in addition to any money flags collected; the others win nothing, unless they accepted a buy-out. If nobody finds the exit point within the 60 minutes, nobody wins.

The host states that the contestants earn money for the amount of time they survive; a close look at the chart on the back of the players' maps shows that the first 10 minutes are worth $100 each, increasing by that much with each 10 minutes, and jumping to $1,000 for each of the final 10 minutes. However, the format of the game renders this game mechanic moot, since only the first player that reaches the exit point wins this money, and after 60 minutes this accumulation comes out to exactly $25,000.

== Utilities ==
The utilities for the show help the contestants avoid being captured by hunters. Each contestant may use each utility one time only. They include:

- Runner Pack: This is given to the contestant at the start of the game. It has multiple functions, and stays with the contestant the entire game.
- Cell Phone: All contestants are issued a cell phone at the start of the game. This cell phone seems to be an iPhone. This is used to keep the contestants in contact with host Trey Farley and given information on missions as well. As noted in the "Studio Backlot" episode, it can also be used to keep in contact with the other contestants. During certain points in the game the blue button on the phone will supply a direct link to Trey and first one who calls and gets through has the option to drop out for an amount of money. As noted in the "Botanical Gardens" episode, there is also a camera in the phone.
- Deflector: This utility forces the hunter it is used on to turn 180 degrees and walk away.
- Freeze Ray: The freeze ray forces one hunter to remain in place for one minute.
- Invisibility Glasses: When used, these glasses force all hunters to ignore the contestant for two minutes. If, due to a hunter's forward momentum, the hunter tags the player while the glasses are active, that capture is nullified. In addition, once removed, the glasses are deactivated, regardless of remaining invisibility time.
- Sonic Stunner: This forces all hunters within earshot at the time of its use to freeze in place for two minutes. As noted in the "Botanical Gardens" episode, once used, it can be used on any hunters the contestant encounters within the following 30 seconds.

== See also ==
- Manswers another show executive produced by Michael Schelp
