= Highway 18 (TV series) =

- Genre: Sport, reality, game show
- Presented by: Keri Murphy
- Country of origin: United States
- Original language: English
- No. of seasons: 1
- No. of episodes: 10

Production
- Production location: Florida
- Running time: 60 minutes

Original release
- Network: Golf Channel
- Release: July 22 – September 30, 2008

Highway 18 is an American reality television game show that premiered on Golf Channel on July 22, 2008 and ended on September 30, 2008, after being filmed in April 2008. Set in Florida, the series is hosted by Keri Murphy. The show features five teams of twosomes racing against each other in a series of challenges to complete a "Clubhouse Challenge" allowing them to move to the next round, in a format based on The Amazing Race. The show airs Tuesday nights at 10pm on Golf Channel.

== Show format ==
Each week, the five teams are given clues to a location to which they must all race. On arriving, they will have a challenge that will test one part of their golf game.

Once they complete this mini-challenge, they will be given clues to get to their next location. This could be another test, a quiz, or the Clubhouse Challenge.

== Clubhouse Challenge ==
The final showdown each week is the Clubhouse Challenge. The teams must play a hole, either both playing or alternating strokes, and complete the hole as quickly as possible. Once the hole is completed, they must rush back to the Clubhouse and retrieve a golf ball. The team who arrives last will lose that challenge. Losing a challenge once will give the team a strike, but losing a second time will be the end of the road for that team.

=== Locations ===
Season 1

- Week 1: TPC Sawgrass
- Week 2: Golden Ocala Golf & Country Club
- Week 3: LPGA International
- Week 4: Champions Gate Golf Club
- Week 5: Copperhead Course
- Week 6: Sara Bay Country Club (Match play)

== Teams ==
- Andy and Parker (eliminated first)
- Raul and Jameica (eliminated second)
- Jay and Peach (eliminated third)
- Ashley and Ashleigh (eliminated fourth)
- Rob and Charlotte (winners)
