= E!'s Pam: Girl on the Loose! =

American reality television series

- Also known as: Pam: Girl on the Loose!
- Genre: Reality television
- Created by: Pamela Anderson
- Directed by: Nigel Dick
- Starring: Pamela Anderson
- Narrated by: Pamela Anderson
- Country of origin: United States
- Original language: English
- No. of seasons: 1
- No. of episodes: 8

Production
- Executive producers: Pamela Anderson; Fenton Bailey; Randy Barbato; Tom Campbell; Jeff Pollack
- Production location: Los Angeles, California
- Camera setup: Single camera
- Running time: 30 minutes

Original release
- Network: E!
- Release: August 3 – September 23, 2008

Pam: Girl on the Loose! is an American reality television series that debuted on E! on August 3, 2008. The program documented the daily life of actress, producer, model, activist, Playboy Playmate and sex symbol Pamela Anderson, her family, and her friends, as she offers a real raw glimpse into her private life that the public and the tabloids don't get a look at.

== Critical reception ==
The New York Daily News gave it 2 stars and added, "Mainly, it's just another low-rent celebrity show along the lines of Keeping Up with the Kardashians - typical for a genre these days that asks very little of celebrity subjects in exchange for getting them on the air."

Note the Los Angeles Times' Mary McNamara: "Age may have prompted her to prove there is a person underneath all that hair, behind all that décolletage, but it's a crowded genre, honey, and Girl on the Loose seems just a little too little too late."

== Episodes ==
No.	Title	Original release date
1	"The Uncensored Confessions of a Trailer-Camp Tramp"	August 3, 2008
Pamela throws an estate sale to get rid of her old and unused possessions; Pamela poses naked in a photo shoot for David LaChapelle; Pamela goes to Las Vegas to see Elton John's Red Piano concert.
2	"For the Boys"	August 10, 2008
Pamela goes on a USO Tour with Toby Keith, Kathy Griffin and the Pussycat Dolls to Camp Pendleton.
3	"Crazy Bitch"	August 17, 2008
Pamela and PETA's Dan Matthews attend the White House Correspondents' Dinner in Washington, D.C.
4	"Shout It Out"	August 31, 2008
Pamela throws the Pepperdine baseball team a surprise Memorial Day barbecue. To everyone's surprise, Tommy Lee shows up and it ends up being a family affair.
5	"Canadians Do It Better"	September 2, 2008
Pamela travels to Vancouver Island to visit her parents and to give her dad a very special gift. She checks in on a property she owns with a partner, NHL star Geoff Courtnall.
6	"Abracadabra"	September 9, 2008
Pam travels all the way to Abu Dhabi with a group of family and friends to participate in a children's charity event.
7	"All Over the World"	September 16, 2008
While the construction crew works feverishly to finish Pamela's house, Pam travels to the UK and Australia making TV appearances and basking in international fame.
8	"Cliffhanger"	September 23, 2008
Pam and the boys celebrate her birthday when they visit Tommy while he tours with Mötley Crüe. Then it's off to Las Vegas to celebrate with her famous and fabulous friends.
