= How Much Is Enough? =

American game show

- Presented by: Corbin Bernsen
- Country of origin: United States
- No. of seasons: 1
- No. of episodes: 40

Production
- Producer: Stephen Brown
- Running time: 20–22 minutes
- Production company: BBC Worldwide America

Original release
- Network: Game Show Network
- Release: January 8 – March 28, 2008

How Much Is Enough? is an American game show that aired on Game Show Network from January 8, 2008 to March 28, 2008. The show was hosted by Corbin Bernsen with four contestants competing with a "money clock" to avoid being the "greediest" contestant.

Despite high expectations among production staff, with one member calling it a potentially "network-defining" show that would "quickly become an audience favorite,” the series did not meet those expectations and was canceled after its first season.

== Gameplay ==
The general objective of the game is to avoid being the greediest contestant. For each money clock played, a dollar figure is shown that rapidly increases or decreases. Contestants hold lock-out buzzers behind their backs and secretly lock-in at a point when they believe the money clock is high enough to be valuable to them, but low enough not to be the "greediest" contestant, or the contestant who locks-in at the highest value. For each of the five money clocks (ranging from $1,000 to $5,000), the greediest contestant banks nothing for the just-played money clock. For the $5,000 clock, the most cautious (lowest value) contestant and the greediest bank nothing. The other contestants for each clock bank the value they locked in. The $1,000, $3,000, and $5,000 clocks count upward from $0 to that amount, while the $2,000 and $4,000 clocks count down to $0.

After five money clocks, the two contestants with the most money banked go to the final face-off. The contestants' scores are added together and become the top value for the final money clock. The clock counts up from $0, and the first contestant to lock-in wins the value shown on the clock. The other contestant earns nothing. The maximum prize a contestant could win in theory is $30,000.

== Production ==
GSN announced the series on November 27, 2007, with actor Corbin Bernsen hosting the show. Bernsen expressed excitement in anticipation of hosting the series, saying, "I have always been a big fan of game shows and I have been tuning into GSN for years. I am excited to be part of the network and this great new show How Much Is Enough?." Jamie Roberts, GSN's Senior Vice President of Programming, had high expectations for Bernsen and the series as a whole, stating, "Corbin brings the game to life with his unique charm and charisma. Combining the show's inherent drama with such a great host, we know it will quickly become an audience favorite." Roberts also added: "It was so different and fresh, and we knew we wanted to get involved with it. The format is clean, simple and very straightforward, but it has surprising layers, and it takes real strategy to play it. This is going to be a network-defining show." Paul Telegdy, Executive Vice President of Content and Production for BBC Worldwide America, was equally optimistic: "This is a tremendously engaging concept. It conjures up such a heightened atmosphere of tension and anticipation recognized to be a crucial element of today’s massively popular game shows."

The series premiered on January 8, 2008. An online mini game based on the show was released earlier that week. Airing in the 9:00 p.m. time slot. On March 28, 2008, GSN aired the series' final episode.
