= List of 24 characters =

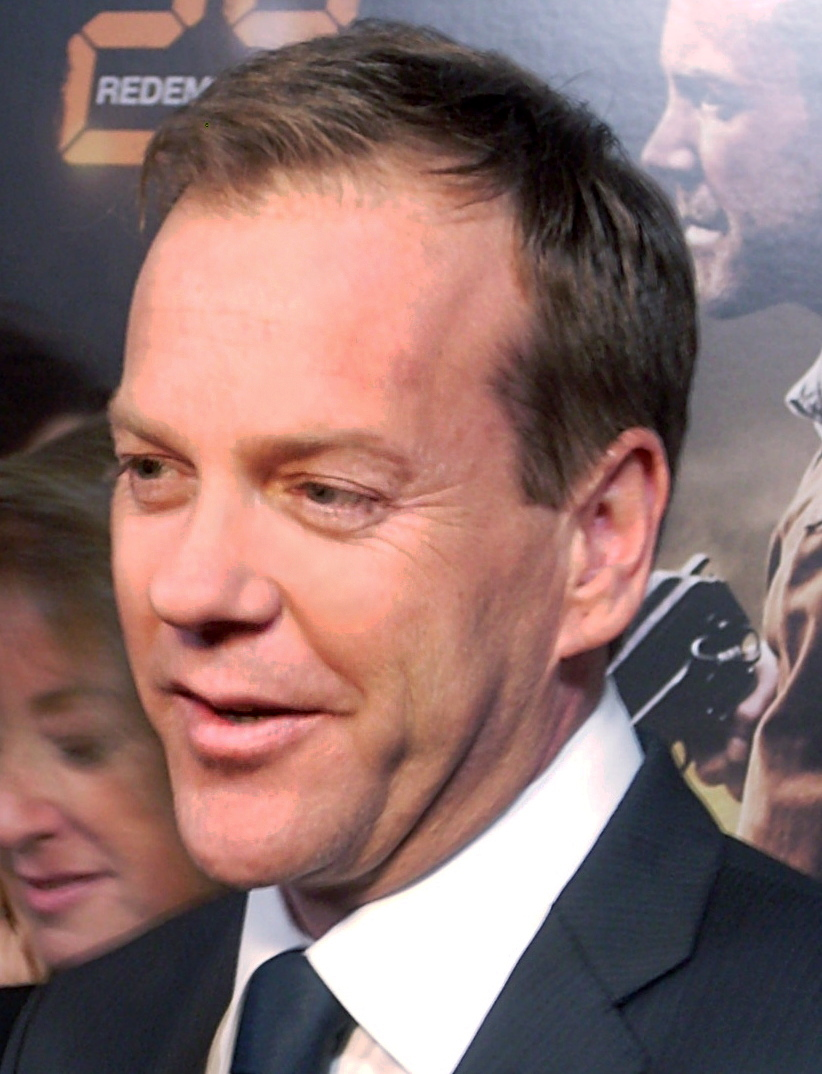
Kiefer Sutherland is the only actor to be a regular cast member in every season of 24.

The following is a list of characters in the American serial drama television series 24, 24: Live Another Day, and 24: Legacy by season and event. The list first names the actor, followed by the character. Some characters have their own pages; see the box below.

The show consists of an ensemble cast. A total of 60 actors have been credited as a part of the starring cast, over the course of eight seasons, one television film, one miniseries, and one spin-off series, international remakes notwithstanding.

== Overview ==
=== Main cast ===
= Main cast (credited)
= Recurring cast (4+)
= Guest cast (1-3)

Actor/actress	Character	Appearances											
Actor/actress	Character	S1	S2	S3	S4	S5	S6	R	S7	S8	LAD	L	Total
Kiefer Sutherland	Jack Bauer	Main	Main	Main	Main	Main	Main	Main	Main	Main	Main		205
Leslie Hope	Teri Bauer	M	P										25
Sarah Clarke	Nina Myers	M	R	R									36
Elisha Cuthbert	Kim Bauer	Main	Main	Main		R			R	R			79
Dennis Haysbert	David Palmer	Main	Main	Main	R	R							80
Carlos Bernard	Tony Almeida	R	Main	Main	R	Main			M			Guest	116
Penny Johnson Jerald	Sherry Palmer	R	M	R									45
Xander Berkeley	George Mason	R	M										27
Eric Balfour	Milo Pressman	R					M						28
Sarah Wynter	Kate Warner		M	G									25
Reiko Aylesworth	Michelle Dessler		Main	Main	R	G							62
James Badge Dale	Chase Edmunds			M									24
Mary Lynn Rajskub	Chloe O'Brian			R	R	Main	Main		Main	Main	Main		137
D. B. Woodside	Wayne Palmer			R		R	M						48
Kim Raver	Audrey Raines				Main	Main	R				M		64
Alberta Watson	Erin Driscoll				M								12
Lana Parrilla	Sarah Gavin				M								12
Roger Cross	Curtis Manning				Main	Main	R						44
William Devane	James Heller				M	R	R				M		32
James Morrison	Bill Buchanan				R	Main	Main		Main				64
Gregory Itzin	Charles Logan				R	M	R			R			45
Louis Lombardi	Edgar Stiles				R	M							37
Jean Smart	Martha Logan					M	G						24
Carlo Rota	Morris O'Brian					R	M		R				29
Jayne Atkinson	Karen Hayes					R	M						30
Peter MacNicol	Tom Lennox						M	G					25
Marisol Nichols	Nadia Yassir						M						24
Regina King	Sandra Palmer						M						9
Bob Gunton	Ethan Kanin						R	Main	Main	R			32
Cherry Jones	Allison Taylor							Main	Main	Main			44
Colm Feore	Henry Taylor							Main	Main				13
Annie Wersching	Renee Walker								Main	Main			37
Jeffrey Nordling	Larry Moss								M				19
Rhys Coiro	Sean Hillinger								M				10
Janeane Garofalo	Janis Gold								M				21
Anil Kapoor	Omar Hassan									M			15
Mykelti Williamson	Brian Hastings									M			17
Katee Sackhoff	Dana Walsh									M			20
Chris Diamantopoulos	Rob Weiss									M			12
John Boyd	Arlo Glass									M			24
Freddie Prinze Jr.	Cole Ortiz									M			24
Yvonne Strahovski	Kate Morgan										M		12
Tate Donovan	Mark Boudreau										M		12
Gbenga Akinnagbe	Erik Ritter										M		11
Giles Matthey	Jordan Reed										M		9
Michael Wincott	Adrian Cross										M		10
Benjamin Bratt	Steve Navarro										M		10
Corey Hawkins	Eric Carter											M	12
Miranda Otto	Rebecca Ingram											M	12
Anna Diop	Nicole Carter											M	11
Teddy Sears	Keith Mullins											M	12
Ashley Thomas	Isaac Carter											M	10
Dan Bucatinsky	Andy Shalowitz											M	12
Coral Peña	Mariana Stiles											M	12
Charlie Hofheimer	Ben Grimes											M	6
Sheila Vand	Nilaa Mizrani											M	8
Raphael Acloque	Jadalla bin-Khalid											M	10
Gerald McRaney	Henry Donovan											M	10
Jimmy Smits	John Donovan											M	12

=== Recurring and guest cast ===
The following recurring guest stars appeared in at least five episodes or were distinguished in the guest star credits.

Key: = Recurring
Key: = Special Guest

Actor/actress	Character	Appearances										
Actor/actress	Character	S1	S2	S3	S4	S5	S6	R	S7	S8	LAD	Total
Tanya Wright	Patty Brooks	9	-	-	-	-	-	-	-	-	-	9
Karina Arroyave	Jamey Farrell	10	-	-	-	-	-	-	-	-	-	10
Jacqui Maxwell	Janet York	6	-	-	-	-	-	-	-	-	-	6
Matthew Carey	Dan Mounts	6	-	-	-	-	-	-	-	-	-	6
Daniel Bess	Rick Allen	18	-	-	-	-	-	-	-	-	-	18
Mia Kirshner	Mandy	3	1	-	3	-	-	-	-	-	-	7
Richard Burgi	Kevin Carroll	11	-	-	-	-	-	-	-	-	-	11
Michael Massee	Ira Gaines	12	-	-	-	-	-	-	-	-	-	12
Vicellous Shannon	Keith Palmer	12	1	-	-	-	-	-	-	-	-	13
Megalyn Echikunwoke	Nicole Palmer	6	-	-	-	-	-	-	-	-	-	6
Glenn Morshower	Aaron Pierce	9	3	9	2	15	1	-	10	-	-	49
Zach Grenier	Carl Webb	9	-	-	-	-	-	-	-	-	-	9
Jude Ciccolella	Mike Novick	11	18	-	8	21	-	-	-	-	-	58
Silas Weir Mitchell	Eli Stram	6	-	-	-	-	-	-	-	-	-	6
Željko Ivanek	Andre Drazen	15	-	-	-	-	-	-	-	-	-	15
Tamara Tunie	Alberta Green	6	-	-	-	-	-	-	-	-	-	6
Misha Collins	Alexis Drazen	7	-	-	-	-	-	-	-	-	-	7
Navi Rawat	Melanie	6	-	-	-	-	-	-	-	-	-	6
Lou Diamond Phillips	Mark DeSalvo	2	-	-	-	-	-	-	-	-	-	2
Dennis Hopper	Victor Drazen	5	-	-	-	-	-	-	-	-	-	5
Skye McCole Bartusiak	Megan Matheson	-	8	-	-	-	-	-	-	-	-	8
Billy Burke	Gary Matheson	-	7	-	-	-	-	-	-	-	-	7
Tamlyn Tomita	Jenny Dodge	-	5	-	-	-	-	-	-	-	-	5
Michelle Forbes	Lynne Kresge	-	18	-	-	-	-	-	-	-	-	18
Laura Harris	Marie Warner	-	14	-	-	-	-	-	-	-	-	14
Phillip Rhys	Reza Naiyeer	-	9	-	-	-	-	-	-	-	-	9
John Terry	Bob Warner	-	12	-	-	-	-	-	-	-	-	12
Marc Casabani	Omar	-	6	-	-	-	-	-	-	-	-	6
John Eddins	Richards	-	5	-	-	-	-	-	-	-	-	5
Innis Casey	Miguel	-	7	-	-	-	-	-	-	-	-	7
Harris Yulin	Roger Stanton	-	9	-	-	-	-	-	-	-	-	9
Francesco Quinn	Syed Ali	-	5	-	-	-	-	-	-	-	-	5
Daniel Dae Kim	Tom Baker	-	8	3	-	-	-	-	-	-	-	11
Randle Mell	Brad Hammond	-	2	3	-	-	-	-	-	-	-	5
Lourdes Benedicto	Carrie Turner	-	10	-	-	-	-	-	-	-	-	10
Donnie Keshawarz	Yusuf Auda	-	6	-	-	-	-	-	-	-	-	6
Alan Dale	James Prescott	-	7	1	-	-	-	-	-	-	-	8
Geoff Pierson	John Keeler	-	-	6	13	-	-	-	-	-	-	19
Joaquim de Almeida	Ramon Salazar	-	-	12	-	-	-	-	-	-	-	12
Christina Chang	Sunny Macer	-	-	6	-	-	-	-	5	-	-	11
Zachary Quinto	Adam Kaufman	-	-	23	-	-	-	-	-	-	-	23
Vincent Laresca	Hector Salazar	-	-	12	-	-	-	-	-	-	-	12
Vanessa Ferlito	Claudia Hernandez	-	-	11	-	-	-	-	-	-	-	11
Jesse Borrego	Gael Ortega	-	-	14	-	-	-	-	-	-	-	14
Riley Smith	Kyle Singer	-	-	6	-	-	-	-	-	-	-	6
Wendy Crewson	Anne Packard	-	-	8	-	-	-	-	-	-	-	8
Agnes Bruckner	Linda	-	-	5	-	-	-	-	-	-	-	5
Andrea Thompson	Nicole Duncan	-	-	5	-	-	-	-	-	-	-	5
Jamie McShane	Gerry Whitehorn	-	-	6	-	-	-	-	-	-	-	6
Greg Ellis	Michael Amador	-	-	9	-	-	-	-	-	-	-	9
Gina Torres	Julia Milliken	-	-	7	-	-	-	-	-	-	-	7
Lothaire Bluteau	Marcus Alvers	-	-	5	-	-	-	-	-	-	-	5
Butch Klein	Eric Richards	-	-	5	-	-	-	-	-	-	-	5
Paul Blackthorne	Stephen Saunders	-	-	10	-	-	-	-	-	-	-	10
Tony Todd	Norris / Benjamin Juma	-	-	1	-	-	-	1	3	-	-	5
Alexandra Lydon	Jane Saunders	-	-	5	-	-	-	-	-	-	-	5
Nestor Serrano	Navi Araz	-	-	-	10	-	-	-	-	-	-	10
Shohreh Aghdashloo	Dina Araz	-	-	-	12	-	-	-	-	-	-	12
Jonathan Ahdout	Behrooz Araz	-	-	-	12	-	-	-	-	-	-	12
Logan Marshall-Green	Richard Heller	-	-	-	6	-	-	-	-	-	-	6
Anil Kumar	Kalil Hasan	-	-	-	5	-	-	-	-	-	-	5
James Frain	Paul Raines	-	-	-	10	-	-	-	-	-	-	10
Tony Plana	Omar	-	-	-	5	-	-	-	-	-	-	5
Leighton Meester	Debbie Pendleton	-	-	-	5	-	-	-	-	-	-	5
Aisha Tyler	Marianne Taylor	-	-	-	8	-	-	-	-	-	-	8
Angela Goethals	Maya Driscoll	-	-	-	5	-	-	-	-	-	-	5
Robertson Dean	Henry Powell	-	-	-	6	-	-	-	-	-	-	6
Arnold Vosloo	Habib Marwan	-	-	-	17	-	-	-	-	-	-	17
Thomas Vincent Kelly	Marc Besson	-	-	-	5	3	-	-	-	-	-	8
Navid Negahban	Abdullah / Jamot	-	-	-	1	-	-	-	-	8	-	9
John Allen Nelson	Walt Cummings	-	-	-	4	7	-	-	-	-	-	11
Tzi Ma	Cheng Zhi	-	-	-	2	1	9	-	-	-	3	15
Jonah Lotan	Spenser Wolff	-	-	-	-	6	-	-	-	-	-	6
Connie Britton	Diane Huxley	-	-	-	-	6	-	-	-	-	-	6
Brady Corbet	Derek Huxley	-	-	-	-	6	-	-	-	-	-	6
Sandrine Holt	Evelyn Martin	-	-	-	-	10	-	-	-	-	-	10
Geraint Wyn Davies	James Nathanson	-	-	-	-	6	-	-	-	-	-	6
Nick Jameson	Yuri Suvarov	-	-	-	-	6	6	-	-	3	-	15
Kathleen Gati	Anya Suvarov	-	-	-	-	5	1	-	-	-	-	6
Mark Sheppard	Ivan Erwich	-	-	-	-	6	-	-	-	-	-	6
Robert Maffia	Andrei	-	-	-	-	6	-	-	-	-	-	6
Sean Astin	Lynn McGill	-	-	-	-	10	-	-	-	-	-	10
Julian Sands	Vladimir Bierko	-	-	-	-	11	-	-	-	-	-	11
Peter Weller	Christopher Henderson	-	-	-	-	11	-	-	-	-	-	11
Ray Wise	Hal Gardner	-	-	-	-	6	-	-	-	-	-	6
Kate Mara	Shari Rothenberg	-	-	-	-	5	-	-	-	-	-	5
Paul McCrane	Graem Bauer	-	-	-	-	5	3	-	-	-	-	8
Stephen Spinella	Miles Papazian	-	-	-	-	10	-	-	-	-	-	10
Adoni Maropis	Abu Fayed	-	-	-	-	-	15	-	-	-	-	15
Alexander Siddig	Hamri Al-Assad	-	-	-	-	-	7	-	-	-	-	7
Harry Lennix	Walid Al-Rezani	-	-	-	-	-	6	-	-	-	-	6
Ryan Cutrona	John Smith	-	-	-	-	-	5	-	6	1	-	11
Rena Sofer	Marilyn Bauer	-	-	-	-	-	12	-	-	-	-	12
Evan Ellingson	Josh Bauer	-	-	-	-	-	10	-	-	-	-	10
Chad Lowe	Reed Pollock	-	-	-	-	-	8	-	-	-	-	8
James Cromwell	Phillip Bauer	-	-	-	-	-	8	-	-	-	-	8
Powers Boothe	Noah Daniels	-	-	-	-	-	14	1	-	-	-	15
Lex Cassar	Ryan	-	-	-	-	-	11	-	-	-	-	11
Rade Serbedzija	Dmitri Gredenko	-	-	-	-	-	8	-	-	-	-	8
Dylan Kenin	Victor	-	-	-	-	-	5	-	-	-	-	5
Kari Matchett	Lisa Miller	-	-	-	-	-	10	-	-	-	-	10
Ricky Schroder	Mike Doyle	-	-	-	-	-	12	-	-	-	-	12
Hakeem Kae-Kazim	Ike Dubaku	-	-	-	-	-	-	1	9	-	-	10
Robert Carlyle	Carl Benton	-	-	-	-	-	-	1	-	-	-	1
Jon Voight	Jonas Hodges	-	-	-	-	-	-	1	10	-	-	11
Mark Aiken	Nichols	-	-	-	-	-	-	1	5	-	-	6
Isaach de Bankolé	Ule Matobo	-	-	-	-	-	-	1	6	-	-	7
Carly Pope	Samantha Roth	-	-	-	-	-	-	1	6	-	-	7
Mark Kiely	Edward Vossler	-	-	-	-	-	-	1	4	-	-	5
Kurtwood Smith	Blaine Mayer	-	-	-	-	-	-	-	7	-	-	7
Warren Kole	Brian Gedge	-	-	-	-	-	-	-	7	-	-	7
Frank John Hughes	Tim Woods	-	-	-	-	-	-	-	17	8	-	25
Lesley Fera	Angela Nelson	-	-	-	-	-	-	-	4	2	-	6
Peter Wingfield	David Emerson	-	-	-	-	-	-	-	5	-	-	5
Ever Carradine	Erika	-	-	-	-	-	-	-	5	-	-	5
Sprague Grayden	Olivia Taylor	-	-	-	-	-	-	-	14	-	-	14
Rory Cochrane	Greg Seaton	-	-	-	-	-	-	-	7	-	-	7
Amy Price-Francis	Cara Bowden	-	-	-	-	-	-	-	6	-	-	6
Will Patton	Alan Wilson	-	-	-	-	-	-	-	5	-	-	5
Akbar Kurtha	Farhad Hassan	-	-	-	-	-	-	-	-	8	-	8
Jennifer Westfeldt	Meredith Reed	-	-	-	-	-	-	-	-	6	-	6
Necar Zadegan	Dalia Hassan	-	-	-	-	-	-	-	-	20	-	20
Nazneen Contractor	Kayla Hassan	-	-	-	-	-	-	-	-	21	-	21
Clayne Crawford	Kevin Wade	-	-	-	-	-	-	-	-	9	-	9
TJ Ramini	Tarin Faroush	-	-	-	-	-	-	-	-	11	-	11
Jürgen Prochnow	Sergei Bazhaev	-	-	-	-	-	-	-	-	7	-	7
David Anders	Josef Bazhaev	-	-	-	-	-	-	-	-	6	-	6
Michael Filipowich	Nick Coughlin	-	-	-	-	-	-	-	-	6	-	6
Callum Keith Rennie	Vladimir Laitanan	-	-	-	-	-	-	-	-	3	-	3
Hrach Titizian	Nabeel	-	-	-	-	-	-	-	-	6	-	6
Mido Hamada	Samir Mehran	-	-	-	-	-	-	-	-	10	-	10
Julian Morris	Owen	-	-	-	-	-	-	-	-	6	-	6
Rami Malek	Marcos Al-Zacar	-	-	-	-	-	-	-	-	3	-	3
Mare Winningham	Elaine Al-Zacar	-	-	-	-	-	-	-	-	2	-	2
Sarah Hollis	Susan	-	-	-	-	-	-	-	-	10	-	10
Graham McTavish	Mikhail Novakovich	-	-	-	-	-	-	-	-	7	-	7
Reed Diamond	Jason Pillar	-	-	-	-	-	-	-	-	8	-	8
Michael Madsen	Jim Ricker	-	-	-	-	-	-	-	-	4	-	4
Julie Claire	Eden Linley	-	-	-	-	-	-	-	-	5	-	5
Eriq La Salle	UN Secretary General	-	-	-	-	-	-	-	-	2	-	2
Christina Chong	Mariana	-	-	-	-	-	-	-	-	-	5	5
Colin Salmon	Coburn	-	-	-	-	-	-	-	-	-	7	7
Ross McCall	Ron Clark	-	-	-	-	-	-	-	-	-	9	9
Branko Tomović	Belcheck	-	-	-	-	-	-	-	-	-	9	9
James Allenby-Kirk	Stosh	-	-	-	-	-	-	-	-	-	7	7
Mandeep Dhillon	Chell	-	-	-	-	-	-	-	-	-	7	7
Charles Furness	Pete	-	-	-	-	-	-	-	-	-	6	6
Emily Berrington	Simone Al-Harazi	-	-	-	-	-	-	-	-	-	7	7
Michelle Fairley	Margot Al-Harazi	-	-	-	-	-	-	-	-	-	8	8
Stephen Fry	Alastair Davies	-	-	-	-	-	-	-	-	-	8	8
Liam Garrigan	Ian Al-Harazi	-	-	-	-	-	-	-	-	-	7	7
Miranda Raison	Caroline Fowlds	-	-	-	-	-	-	-	-	-	6	6
Stanley Townsend	Anatol Stolnavich	-	-	-	-	-	-	-	-	-	5	5
Adam Sinclair	Gavin Leonard	-	-	-	-	-	-	-	-	-	6	6

== 24: Season 1 ==
=== The Bauers ===
- Kiefer Sutherland – Jack Bauer
- Leslie Hope – Teri Bauer
- Elisha Cuthbert – Kim Bauer

=== CTU / Division ===
- Sarah Clarke – Nina Myers
- Carlos Bernard – Tony Almeida
- Karina Arroyave – Jamey Farrell
- Eric Balfour – Milo Pressman
- Michael O'Neill – Richard Walsh
- Scott Denny – Scott Baylor
- Xander Berkeley – George Mason
- Tamara Tunie – Alberta Green
- Paul Schulze – Ryan Chappelle
- Kevin Ramsey – Ted Paulson
- Kirk Baltz – Teddy Hanlin
- Sam Ayers – Jeff Breeher

=== Palmer's family and staff ===
- Dennis Haysbert – David Palmer
- Penny Johnson Jerald – Sherry Palmer
- Megalyn Echikunwoke – Nicole Palmer
- Vicellous Reon Shannon – Keith Palmer
- Jude Ciccolella – Mike Novick
- Tanya Wright – Patty Brooks
- Kara Zediker – Elizabeth Nash
- Zach Grenier – Carl Webb
- Glenn Morshower – Aaron Pierce
- Greg Hartigan – Secret Service Agent Berkin
- Jesse D. Goins – Secret Service Agent Alan Hayes
- Michael Bryan French – Secret Service Agent Frank Simes

=== Other associates of Palmer ===
- Devika Parikh – Maureen Kingsley
- John Prosky – George Ferragamo
- Ivar Brogger – Frank Ames

=== First assassination plot ===
- Michael Massee – Ira Gaines
- Daniel Bess – Rick Allen
- Matthew Carey – Dan Mounts
- Richard Burgi – Kevin Carroll
- Rudolf Martin – Jonathan Matijevich
- Mia Kirshner – Mandy
- Silas Weir Mitchell – Eli Stram
- John Hawkes – Greg Penticoff
- Kim Murphy – Bridgit
- Al Leong – Neill Choi
- Jesse Corti – Charles McLemore

=== Drazen's family and associates ===
- Dennis Hopper – Victor Drazen
- Željko Ivanek – Andre Drazen
- Misha Collins – Alexis Drazen
- Henri Lubatti – Jovan Myovic
- Currie Graham – Ted Cofell

=== Rick's friends outside the plot ===
- Edoardo Ballerini – Frank Allard
- Navi Rawat – Melanie

=== Miscellaneous ===
- Wade Andrew Williams – Robert Ellis
- Jacqui Maxwell – Janet York
- Lou Diamond Phillips – Mark DeSalvo
- Kathleen Wilhoite – Lauren Proctor
- Pauley Perrette – Tanya
- Jason Matthew Smith – Chris
- Rudolf Martin – Martin Belkin
- Keram Malicki-Sánchez – Larry Rogow
- John Cothran Jr. – Sgt. Kiley
- David Barrera – Officer Phillips
- Tony Perez – Srgt. Douglas Newman
- Kim Miyori – Dr. Susan Y. Collier
- Judith Scott – Dr. Rose M. Kent

== 24: Season 2 ==
=== CTU / Division ===
- Kiefer Sutherland – Jack Bauer
- Xander Berkeley – George Mason
- Carlos Bernard – Tony Almeida
- Reiko Aylesworth – Michelle Dessler
- Paul Schulze – Ryan Chappelle
- Randle Mell – Brad Hammond (CTU Division Supervisor)
- Sara Gilbert – Paula Schaeffer
- Lourdes Benedicto – Carrie Turner
- Donnie Keshawarz – Yusuf Auda
- Daniel Dae Kim – Tom Baker
- John Eddins – Agent Richards
- Donzaleigh Abernathy – Barbara Maccabee
- Michael Cudlitz – Rick Phillips

=== Palmer's family and administration ===
- Dennis Haysbert – President David Palmer
- Penny Johnson Jerald – Sherry Palmer
- Vicellous Reon Shannon – Keith Palmer
- Jude Ciccolella – Mike Novick
- Glenn Morshower – Aaron Pierce
- Timothy Carhart – Eric Rayburn
- Harris Yulin – Roger Stanton
- Michelle Forbes – Lynne Kresge
- Alan Dale – Vice President James Prescott
- Steven Culp – Ted Simmons
- John Rubinstein – Alex (Secretary of State)
- Robert Pine – Secretary of Agriculture
- Dean Norris – General Bowden
- Terry Bozeman – Richard Armus
- Tamlyn Tomita – Jenny Dodge (Press Secretary)
- Richard Holden – General Stone
- Greg Hartigan – Secret Service Agent Berkin

=== Kim's story ===
- Elisha Cuthbert – Kim Bauer
- Billy Burke – Gary Matheson
- Tracy Middendorf – Carla Matheson
- Skye McCole Bartusiak – Megan Matheson
- Kevin Dillon – Lonnie McRae
- Innis Casey – Miguel
- Michael McGrady – Officer Raymond Brown
- Miguel Perez – Ranger Mike Kramer
- Victor Rivers – Officer Amis
- Jamison Jones – Deputy Nirman
- Sterling Macer Jr. – Deputy Raynes
- Susan Gibney – Anna
- Lombardo Boyar – Ramon Garcia
- Brent Sexton – Frank Davies

=== Foreign diplomats ===
- Alexander Zale – Ambassador Shareef
- Christopher Maher – Deputy Prime Minister Barghouti
- Nicholas Guilak – Farhad Salim

=== The Warners and the Naiyeers ===
- John Terry – Bob Warner
- Sarah Wynter – Kate Warner
- Laura Harris – Marie Warner
- Phillip Rhys – Reza Naiyeer
- Yareli Arizmendi – Karima Naiyeer
- Shaun Duke – Hasan Naiyeer

=== Traitors involved in terrorist plot ===
- Sarah Clarke – Nina Myers
- Gregg Henry – Jonathan Wallace

=== Wald's crew ===
- Jon Gries – Joseph Wald
- Douglas O'Keeffe – Eddie Grant
- Gregory Sporleder – Dave
- Jimmi Simpson – Chris

=== Ali's family and Second Wave ===
- Francesco Quinn – Syed Ali
- Anthony Azizi – Mamud Rasheed Faheen
- Shaheen Vaaz – Syed Ali's wife
- Ike Bram – Fareed Ali
- Raja Jean Fenske – Asad Ali
- Aki Avni – Mohsen
- Maz Jobrani – Marko Khatami
- Marc Casabani – Omar
- Fred Toma – Basheer

=== Peter Kingsley Group ===
- Tobin Bell – Peter Kingsley
- Thomas Kretschmann – Max
- Eugene Robert Glazer – Alexander Trepkos
- Mia Kirshner – Mandy
- Nina Landey – Eve
- Rick D. Wasserman – Alex Hewitt
- Peter Outerbridge – Ronnie Stark
- Brian Goodman – Raymond O'Hara
- Jeff Wincott – Davis
- Mark Ivanir – Trask

=== Miscellaneous federal agents, police, and medical personnel ===
- Scott Allan Campbell – Dr. Porter (Field medic at warehouse, diagnoses George Mason)
- Sal Landi – Sgt. Arroyo (LAPD officer at warehouse)
- Christopher Murray – FBI Agent Dockerty (Agent at airfield)

=== Miscellaneous characters ===
- Antonio David Lyons – Cam Strocker (Telephone Repairman taken hostage)
- Peter Gregory – Dr. Spire (Doctor at medical center)
- Bernard White – Al-Fulani (Imam)
- Justin Louis – Danny Dessler (Michelle Dessler's brother)
- Jeff Wincott – Davis (kidnaps and tortures Jack)
- Eric Christian Olsen – John Mason (George Mason's son)
- Jim Abele – Ralph Burton (Private Investigator who helps Kate Warner)
- Al Sapienza – Paul Koplin (Ralph Burton's boss)
- Michael Holden – Ron Wieland (Journalist; Held by the President)
- Michael Mantell – Steve Hillenburg (CIA Operative who aides Sherry Palmer)
- Michael James Reed – Foreman (Foreman for a construction crew that Marie Warner talks to)
- Nick Offerman – Marcus (Captures Kate Warner and assaulted Yusuf Auda)
- Raymond Cruz – Rouse (Captures Kate Warner and assaulted Yusuf Auda)
- Maurice Compte – Cole (Captures Kate Warner and assaulted Yusuf Auda)
- Carmen Argenziano – General Gratz

== 24: Season 3 ==
=== CTU / Division ===
- Kiefer Sutherland – Jack Bauer
- Elisha Cuthbert – Kim Bauer
- Carlos Bernard – Tony Almeida
- Reiko Aylesworth – Michelle Dessler
- James Badge Dale – Chase Edmunds
- Jesse Borrego – Gael Ortega
- Mary Lynn Rajskub – Chloe O'Brian
- Zachary Quinto – Adam Kaufman
- Paul Schulze – Ryan Chappelle
- Randle Mell – Brad Hammond
- Daniel Dae Kim – Tom Baker
- Butch Klein – Darren Richards
- Jenette Goldstein – Rae Plachecki
- Carrie Kim – Jade Paik
- David Herman – Dalton Furrelle
- Ed Wasser – Jason Carasone
- Tony Wayne – Robin Powers
- Neal Matarazzo – D.J. Graves

=== Palmer's family and administration and associates ===
- Dennis Haysbert – David Palmer (President of the United States)
- Penny Johnson Jerald – Sherry Palmer(David's ex-wife)
- Glenn Morshower – Aaron Pierce (The head of Palmer's Secret Service detail)
- D. B. Woodside – Wayne Palmer(David Palmer's Brother; Chief of Staff)
- Wendy Crewson – Anne Packard (Palmer's personal doctor; Palmer's girlfriend)
- Jamie McShane – Gerry Whitehorn (Palmer's press chief)
- Albert Hall – Alan Milliken (Major contributor to Palmer's campaign/Ally of his presidency)
- Gina Torres – Julia Milliken (Wife of Alan Milliken)
- Alan Dale – Jim Prescott (Vice President of the United States)
- Conor O'Farrell – Ted Packard (Anne's ex-husband)
- Michael Cavanaugh – Joseph O'Laughlin (Secretary of Homeland Security)
- Greg Hartigan – Secret Service Agent Berkin
- Richard Holden – General Stone

=== Saunders' family and crew ===
- Paul Blackthorne – Stephen Saunders (Former soldier and MI6 agent; turned into terrorist; main villain)
- Greg Ellis – Michael Amador (Seller of biological weapon)
- Lothaire Bluteau – Marcus Alvers (arms dealer; sold the Cordilla Virus; assumed to have a past with Nina Myers)
- Salvator Xuereb – Arthur Rabens (one of Stephen Saunders' couriers, has biological weapon in L.A.)
- Alexandra Lydon – Jane Saunders (Daughter of Stephen Saunders)
- Joe D'Angerio – Osterlind (Saunders' assistant)
- Gabrielle Fitzpatrick – Diana White (lover of Steven Saunders; help fund Saunders' operation)

=== Salazar family and associates ===
- Joaquim de Almeida – Ramon Salazar (Narco-terrorist; Head of the Salazar family)
- Vincent Laresca – Hector Salazar (Ramon's brother; Head of family in Ramon's absence)
- Vanessa Ferlito – Claudia Hernandez (Girlfriend of Hector)
- Josh Cruz – Oriol (Claudia's father)
- Julian Rodriguez – Sergio (Claudia's brother)
- Lorry Goldman – Douglas Shaye (Ramon's lawyer)
- Gino Montesinos – Eduardo (Henchman)
- Eduardo Garcia – Emilio (Henchman)
- Gonzalo Menendez – Pablo (Henchman)
- David Labiosa – David Gomez (Henchman)

=== Singer family and associates ===
- Riley Smith – Kyle Singer (First time "drug dealer")
- Ted Marcoux – Sam Singer (Kyle's unemployed father)
- Lucinda Jenney – Helen Singer (Kyle's mother)
- Agnes Bruckner – Linda (Kyle's girlfriend)
- Kett Turton – Tim (Kyle's best friend)

=== National Health Services ===
- Andrea Thompson – Dr. Nicole Duncan
- Christina Chang – Dr. Sunny Macer

=== Miscellaneous police / Federal employees / Medical ===
- Paul Vincent O’Connor – Police Chief Hendrix
- Tony Todd – Detective Michael Norris (interrogates Julia Milliken)
- Simon Templeman – Trevor Tomlinson (Agent in MI6 office in LA; killed in gunship attack)
- Maria del Mar – Rachel Forrester
- Kevin Chapman – Kevin Mitchell

=== Chandler Plaza Hotel staff and guests ===
- Doug Savant – Craig Phillips (Head of Hotel security)
- Paris Tanaka – Maya
- Sue Jin Song – Annalie Kim
- Scott Klace – Danny
- Brigid Brannagh – Kathy McCartney

=== Miscellaneous characters ===
- Sarah Wynter – Kate Warner (Ex-girlfriend of Jack Bauer)
- Sarah Clarke – Nina Myers (Terrorist; Former CTU agent)
- Geoff Pierson – John Keeler (Republican Presidential Candidate)
- Mark Rolston – Bruce Foxton (professional evidence retriever)
- Carlos Gómez – Luis Annicon (Prison Supervisor; one of Jack's companions in the one year operation that brought down Ramon Salazar)
- Kamala Lopez-Dawson – Theresa Ortega (Gael's wife)
- JF Pryor – Zack Porter (Drug-dealer)
- Jack Kehler – Kevin Kelly
- Matt Salinger – Mark Kanar
- Rick Garcia – Rick Garcia
- Patrick Fabian – William Cole
- Jenni Blong – Susan Cole

== 24: Season 4 ==
=== Department of Defense / Heller's family ===
- Kiefer Sutherland – Jack Bauer (Special Assistant to the Secretary of Defense)
- William Devane – James Heller(United States Secretary of Defense)
- Logan Marshall-Green – Richard Heller (James Heller's son)
- Kim Raver – Audrey Raines(James Heller's daughter; Jack Bauer's girlfriend; Senior Policy Assistant to Heller)
- James Frain – Paul Raines (Audrey's estranged husband)
- David Newsom – Scott Borman (Heller's aide)

=== CTU / Division ===
- Carlos Bernard – Tony Almeida
- Reiko Aylesworth – Michelle Dessler
- Alberta Watson – Erin Driscoll
- Mary Lynn Rajskub – Chloe O'Brian
- James Morrison – Bill Buchanan
- Roger Cross – Curtis Manning
- Lana Parrilla – Sarah Gavin
- Louis Lombardi – Edgar Stiles
- Aisha Tyler – Marianne Taylor
- Robert Cicchini – Howard Bern
- Cameron Bancroft – Lee Castle
- Shawn Doyle – Ronnie Lobell
- Thomas Vincent Kelly – Marc Besson
- Butch Klein – Eric Richards
- Naomi Kirkpatrick – Meredith Atterson
- Brandon Barash – Brandon
- Shannon Becker – Allison Nichols
- Michael Bofshever – Dr. Mark Kaylis
- Gwendoline Yeo – Melissa Raab
- Alicia Coppola – Azara Nasir

=== Terrorist group ===
- Arnold Vosloo – Habib Marwan
- Nestor Serrano – Navi Araz
- Shohreh Aghdashloo – Dina Araz
- Jonathan Ahdout – Behrooz Araz
- Ned Vaughn – Mitch Anderson
- Tony Plana – Omar
- Mia Kirshner – Mandy
- Anil Kumar – Kalil Hasan
- Adam Alexi-Malle – Joseph Fayed
- Dagmara Dominczyk – Nicole
- John Thaddeus – Joseph "Joe" Prado
- Keith Szarabajka – Robert Morrison
- Kris Iyer – Sabir Ardakani
- Faran Tahir – Tomas Sherek
- Matt Gallini – Abdul Mahnesh
- Kiran Rao – Hikmat Palpatine

=== Keeler's family and administration ===
- Geoff Pierson – President John Keeler
- Chris Olivero – Kevin Keeler
- Gregory Itzin – Vice-president Charles Logan
- Jude Ciccolella – Mike Novick
- John Allen Nelson – Logan's Chief of Security Walt Cummings
- Glenn Morshower – Secret Service Agent Aaron Pierce
- Dennis Haysbert – former President David Palmer
- J. Patrick McCormack – Robert Franklin
- Patrick Kilpatrick – Secret Service Agent Dale Spalding
- Matt Salinger – Mark Kanar

=== McLennan-Forster storyline ===
- Robertson Dean – Henry Powell
- Bill Smitrovich – Gene McLennan
- Richard Marcus – Forbes
- Albie Selznick – John Reiss
- Tomas Arana – Dave Conlon
- Amin Nazemzadeh – Naji
- Omid Abtahi – Safa
- Christopher B. Duncan – Specter

=== Chinese Consulate ===
- Tzi Ma – Cheng Zhi
- Peter Chin – Lee Jong
- François Chau – Koo Yin
- Ping Wu – Su Ming

=== Miscellaneous characters ===
- Lukas Haas – Andrew Paige
- Leighton Meester – Debbie Pendleton
- Angela Goethals – Maya Driscoll (Erin Driscoll's daughter)
- Roxanne Day – Jen Slater
- T. J. Thyne – Jason Girard
- Claudette Mink – Kelly Girard
- Evan Handler – David Weiss
- Tim Kelleher – Greg Merfield (Secret Service Agent)
- Lina Patel – Nabilla Al-Jamil
- Phyllis Lyons – Karen Pendleton
- Michael Benyaer – Naseem
- Hector Luis Bustamante – Dr. Martinez
- Rick Garcia – Rick Garcia

== 24: Season 5 ==
=== Bauer's family and associates ===
- Kiefer Sutherland – Jack Bauer
- Elisha Cuthbert – Kim Bauer
- Kim Raver – Audrey Raines
- C. Thomas Howell – Barry Landes

=== Jack's Inner Circle ===
- Mary Lynn Rajskub – Chloe O'Brian (CTU agent) see also CTU / Division / Homeland Security
- Reiko Aylesworth – Michelle Dessler (former CTU Division Deputy Director; Tony's wife)
- Carlos Bernard – Tony Almeida (former CTU Director; Michelle's husband)

=== CTU / Division / Homeland Security ===
- James Morrison – Bill Buchanan(CTU Director/ CTU Division Director)
- Mary Lynn Rajskub – Chloe O'Brian (CTU agent)
- Carlo Rota – Morris O'Brian (Chloe O'Brian's ex-husband)
- Sean Astin – Lynn McGill (Division; takes over as CTU Director)
- Kim Raver – Audrey Raines (DOD liaison for CTU)
- Louis Lombardi – Edgar Stiles(CTU agent)
- Roger Cross – Curtis Manning (CTU agent; Head of Field Ops)
- Jayne Atkinson – Karen Hayes(Homeland Security official)
- Stephen Spinella – Miles Papazian (Hayes' assistant)
- Jonah Lotan – Spenser Wolff (CTU agent)
- Danielle Burgio – Carrie Bendis (CTU agent)
- Kate Mara – Shari Rothenberg (CTU agent)
- Martin A. Papazian – Rick Burke
- Thomas Vincent Kelly – Marc Besson
- Jenny Levine – Valerie Harris
- Peter Asle Holden – Harry Swinton (CTU security guard)
- Carl Edwards – Jim Hill (Homeland Security official)
- Josie Di Vincenzo – CTU Agent Mara Tyler
- David Joyner – CTU S.W.A.T Agent Jones
- Michael Roddy – CTU S.W.A.T Agent Smith
- Tony Wayne – Robin Powers
- Alex Castillo – CTU Guard Hugo
- Marci Michelle – CTU Agent Marcy Reynolds
- Thomas Howell – CTU Guard Henry
- Billy Chamberlain – CTU Agent Fitzpatrick
- John McCain – CTU staffer

=== Sentox Nerve Gas Conspiracy ===
- Gregory Itzin – Charles Logan
- Paul McCrane – Graem Bauer
- Peter Weller – Christopher Henderson
- Geraint Wyn Davies – James Nathanson
- John Allen Nelson – Walt Cummings
- Jeff Kober – Conrad Haas
- Robert Rusler – Hank
- José Zúñiga – Joseph Malina
- Sky Soleil – John Stratton
- John Butox – Steve Miller
- Carl Gilliard – Ron Swanson

=== Federal Government officials, employees and associates ===
- Gregory Itzin – Charles Logan (President)
- Jean Smart – Martha Logan (First Lady)
- Ray Wise – Hal Gardner (Vice President)
- John Allen Nelson – Walt Cummings (Chief of Staff)
- Jude Ciccolella – Mike Novick (Senior advisor)
- Glenn Morshower – Aaron Pierce (Secret Service)
- William Devane – James Heller (Secretary of Defense)
- Sandrine Holt – Evelyn Martin (Martha's personal aide)
- Alla Korot – Suzanne Cummings (Walt's wife)
- Anita Finlay – Wendy Brown (White House aide)
- Robb Reesman – Dr. Hill (Martha's personal doctor)
- Taylor Nichols – Burke
- David McDivitt – White House staffer
- Tracy Howe – Secret Service Agent Justin Adams
- Jason Grutter – Secret Service Agent Doug Masters
- Tim Mikulecky – Secret Service Agent Mark Wexler

=== Palmer family ===
- Dennis Haysbert – David Palmer
- D. B. Woodside – Wayne Palmer

=== Russian Federation ===
- Nick Jameson – Yuri Suvarov
- Kathleen Gati – Anya Suvarov

=== Russian separatists and collaborators ===
- Julian Sands – Vladimir Bierko
- Mark Sheppard – Ivan Erwich
- David Dayan Fisher – Anton Beresch
- Alex Kuznetsov – Ostroff
- Stana Katic – Collette Stenger
- Patrick Bauchau – Jacob Rossler
- Timothy Omundson – Polokoff
- Marat Oyvetsky – Viktor Grigorin
- Taras Los – Chevensky
- Robert Maffia – Andrei
- Timothy V. Murphy – Schaeffer
- Yorgo Constantine – Mikhail

=== People's Republic of China ===
- Tzi Ma – Cheng Zhi

=== Miscellaneous Feds/Police/Medical ===
- John G. Connolly – Sgt. Mike McLaren

=== Miscellaneous characters ===
- Connie Britton – Diane Huxley
- Brady Corbet – Derek Huxley
- Penny Balfour – Jenny McGill
- Henry Ian Cusick – Theo Stoller
- Matthew Boylan – Dwayne Thompkins
- Angela Sarafyan – Inessa Kovalevsky
- Skylar Roberge – Amy Martin
- JoBeth Williams – Miriam Henderson
- Pia Artesona – Joanna Tandy
- Channon Roe – Cal
- Andrew Hawkes – Scott Evans
- Tom Wright – Admiral Kirkland
- Jeremy Ray Valdez – Petty Officer Tim Rooney
- Eddie Mekka – Ned
- Rick Garcia – Rick Garcia

== 24: Season 6 ==
=== Bauer's family and associates ===
- Kiefer Sutherland – Jack Bauer
- James Cromwell – Phillip Bauer
- Paul McCrane – Graem Bauer
- Rena Sofer – Marilyn Bauer
- Evan Ellingson – Josh Bauer
- Kim Raver – Audrey Raines
- Mark Bramhall – Sam

=== CTU / Division / District ===
- James Morrison – Bill Buchanan
- Marisol Nichols – Nadia Yassir
- Mary Lynn Rajskub – Chloe O'Brian
- Carlo Rota – Morris O'Brian
- Roger Cross – Curtis Manning
- Eric Balfour – Milo Pressman
- Rick Schroder – Mike Doyle
- Martin A. Papazian – Rick Burke
- Spencer Garrett – Ben Kram (supervisor from Division)
- James C. Victor – Hal Turner (CTU Agent)
- Robb Weller – CTU Field Agent
- Brian Silverman – CTU Field Agent
- Lauten Richard Metcalfe – CTU Agent Stan Shavers
- Lex Cassar – CTU Agent Ryan
- Merik Tadros – CTU Agent Jamal
- J. R. Bourne – CTU Agent Connell Johnson
- Tony Wayne – Robin Powers

=== Federal Government officials, employees and associates ===
- D. B. Woodside – Wayne Palmer (President of the United States)
- Peter MacNicol – Tom Lennox(President Palmer's Chief of Staff)
- Jayne Atkinson – Karen Hayes (National Security Advisor)
- Regina King – Sandra Palmer
- Powers Boothe – Noah Daniels (vice-president of the United States)
- Chad Lowe – Reed Pollock (Deputy Chief of Staff)
- Kari Matchett – Lisa Miller
- Bob Gunton – Ethan Kanin (Secretary of Defense)
- Michael Shanks – Mark Bishop (Lobbyist)
- Michael Reilly Burke – Bruce Carson
- Jim Holmes – Arthur Welton
- Ray Laska – Kevin Graves (Attorney General)
- D. C. Douglas – Blake Simon (President Palmer's Advisor)
- Matt McKenzie – Agent Hollister (Secret Service Agent)
- Andrea Grano – Ellen Price (President Palmer's press secretary)
- Jolene Kim – Melinda (President Palmer's assistant)
- Jamison Jones – Dan (Head of Secret Service)
- William Bumiller – Agent Lowry (Secret Service Agent)
- Matt Battaglia – Agent Jennings (Secret Service Agent)
- Ajay Mehta – Middle Eastern Ambassador
- Peter Iannone – Homeland Security Official
- Kurt Hueig – Homeland Security Official
- Myra Mawk – Homeland Security Official

=== People's Republic of China ===
- Tzi Ma – Cheng Zhi
- Ian Anthony Dale – Zhou Yong

=== Russian/Islamic Terrorists ===
- Adoni Maropis – Abu Fayed
- Rade Šerbedžija – General Dmitri Gredenko
- David Hunt – Darren McCarthy
- Kal Penn – Ahmed Amar
- Shaun Majumder – Hasan Numair
- Missy Crider – Rita Brady
- Sam Kanater – General Mohmar Habib
- Steven Schub – Samir Hussain
- Dylan Kenin – Victor
- Patrick Sabongui – Nasir
- Said Faraj – Halil
- Sammy Sheik – Masheer
- Adrian R'Mante – Omar

=== Phillip's Conspirators/BXJ Technologies ===
- James Cromwell – Phillip Bauer
- Paul McCrane – Graem Bauer
- Maury Sterling – Kozelek Hacker
- Adrian Neil – Liddy

=== Anacostia Detention Facility ===
- Scott William Winters – Agent Samuels
- Al Faris – Salim
- Haaz Sleiman – Heydar

=== Russian Federation ===
- John Noble – Anatoly Markov
- Nick Jameson – Yuri Suvarov
- Kathleen Gati – Anya Suvarov

=== Miscellaneous characters ===
- William Devane – James Heller
- Glenn Morshower – Aaron Pierce
- Gregory Itzin – Charles Logan
- Jean Smart – Martha Logan
- Alexander Siddig – Hamri Al-Assad
- Harry Lennix – Walid Al-Rezani
- Raphael Sbarge – Ray Wallace
- Megan Gallagher – Jillian Wallace
- Michael Angarano – Scott Wallace
- Chris Kramer – Stuart Pressman
- Pat Healy – Marcus
- Eric Bruskotter – Stan
- Nancy Cartwright – Jeannie Tyler
- Devon Gummersall – Mark Hauser
- Scott Michael Campbell – Brady Hauser

== 24: Redemption and Season 7 ==
The following characters appeared in the television film 24: Redemption and the seventh season of the series.

=== Bauer family and others ===
- Kiefer Sutherland – Jack Bauer
- Elisha Cuthbert – Kim Bauer
- Paul Wesley – Stephen (Kim's husband)
- Claire Geare – Teri (Kim's daughter)

=== FBI ===
- Jeffrey Nordling – Larry Moss (FBI Special Agent in Charge)
- Annie Wersching – Renee Walker (FBI Special Agent)
- Janeane Garofalo – Janis Gold (FBI Analyst)
- Rhys Coiro – Sean Hillinger (FBI Analyst)
- Ever Carradine – Erika (Computer Analyst)
- John Billingsley – Michael Latham (Security specialist)

=== Federal government officials, employees and associates ===
- Powers Boothe – President Noah Daniels
- Cherry Jones – Allison Taylor (President of the United States of America)
- Colm Feore – Henry Taylor (First Gentleman)
- Sprague Grayden – Olivia Taylor (First Daughter)
- Eric Lively – Roger Taylor
- Cameron Daddo – Mitchell Hayworth (Vice President of the United States of America)
- Peter MacNicol as Tom Lennox
- Bob Gunton – Ethan Kanin (White House Chief of Staff)
- Isaach De Bankolé – Prime Minister Ule Motobo
- Glenn Morshower – Aaron Pierce(Former Secret Service Agent)
- Warren Kole – Brian Gedge (Secret Service Agent)
- Mark Kiely – Edward Vossler (Secret Service Agent)
- Frank John Hughes – Tim Woods (Secretary of Homeland Security)
- Kurtwood Smith – Senator Blaine Mayer
- Gil Bellows – Frank Trammell (U.S. Embassy Official in Sengala)
- Ryan Cutrona – Admiral John Smith
- Christina Chang – Dr. Sunny Macer
- Mark Derwin – Joe Stevens (Secretary of State)
- Lesley Fera – Angela Nelson (Press Secretary)
- Sean Michael – Charles Solenz

=== "Underground" CTU ===
- Kiefer Sutherland – Jack Bauer
- Carlos Bernard – Tony Almeida
- Mary Lynn Rajskub – Chloe O'Brian
- James Morrison – Bill Buchanan
- Carlo Rota – Morris O'Brian

=== Juma regime ===
- Tony Todd – General Benjamin Juma (Leader of Coup in Sangala)
- Hakeem Kae-Kazim – Colonel Iké Dubaku
- Peter Wingfield – David Emerson
- Arjay Smith – Laurent Dubaku
- Mark Aiken – Nichols
- Dameon Clarke – Alan Tanner
- Maximiliano Hernández – Donnie Fox
- Nick Chinlund – Masters

=== Starkwood ===
- Jon Voight – Jonas Hodges
- Rory Cochrane – Greg Seaton
- Chris Mulkey – Doug Knowles
- Michael Rodrick – Stokes
- Gabriel Casseus – Robert Galvez
- Sebastian Roché – John Quinn
- Eyal Podell – Ryan Burnett (Senator Mayer's Advisor who is in league with Starkwood)

=== Prion Variant cabal ===
- Will Patton – Alan Wilson
- Amy Price-Francis – Cara Bowden (operative disguised as Hodges' lawyer)

=== Miscellaneous characters ===
- Robert Carlyle – Carl Benton
- Tommy Flanagan – Gabriel Schector
- Kris Lemche – Chris Whitley
- Carly Pope – Samantha Roth (Roger Taylor's Girlfriend)
- Tonya Pinkins – Alama Motobo
- Andi Chapman – Rosa Donoso
- Enuka Okuma – Marika Donoso
- Omid Abtahi – Jibraan Al-Zarian
- Ravi Kapoor – Muhtadi Gohar
- Rafi Gavron – Hamid Al-Zarian
- Siyabulela Ramba – Willie
- Don McManus – Bob Peluso
- Mary Page Keller – Sarah

== 24: Season 8 ==
=== Bauer's family and associates ===
- Kiefer Sutherland – Jack Bauer
- Elisha Cuthbert – Kim Bauer
- Annie Wersching – Renee Walker
- Paul Wesley – Stephen
- Claire Geare – Teri

=== CTU NY ===
- Mykelti Williamson – Brian Hastings
- Mary Lynn Rajskub – Chloe O'Brian
- Freddie Prinze Jr. – Cole Ortiz
- Katee Sackhoff – Dana Walsh
- John Boyd – Arlo Glass
- Julian Morris – Owen
- Matthew Yang King (as Matt Yang King) – King
- Jamie Martz – Nate Burke
- Justin Alston – Beck

=== Federal Government officials, employees and associates ===
- Cherry Jones – President Allison Taylor
- Chris Diamantopoulos – Chief of Staff Rob Weiss
- Bob Gunton – Secretary of State Ethan Kanin
- Gregory Itzin – Former President Charles Logan
- Frank John Hughes – Tim Woods
- Reed Diamond – Jason Pillar
- Michael Gaston – General David Brucker
- Eriq La Salle – UN Secretary General
- Lesley Fera – Angela Nelson
- Merle Dandridge – Kristen Smith
- Julie Claire – Eden Linley
- Michael Irby – Adrion Bishop
- Christina Cox – Molly O'Connor
- Kathryn Winslow – Ellen Kramer
- Chris McGarry – Frank Haynum
- Sarah Hollis – Susan

=== Islamic Republic of Kamistan ===
- Anil Kapoor – President Omar Hassan
- Necar Zadegan – Dalia Hassan
- Nazneen Contractor – Kayla Hassan
- Akbar Kurtha – Farhad Hassan
- T. J. Ramini – Tarin Faroush
- Mido Hamada – Samir Mehran
- Rami Malek – Marcos Al-Zacar
- Hrach Titizian – Nabeel
- Navid Negahban – Jamot
- Ethan Rains – Ali
- Rizwan Manji – Ahman

=== Red Square ===
- Jürgen Prochnow – Sergei Bazhaev
- David Anders – Josef Bazhaev
- Gene Farber – Oleg Bazhaev
- Callum Keith Rennie – Vladimir Laitanan
- Doug Hutchison – Davros
- Jordan Marder – Dimitri
- Jon Sklaroff – Ziya Dakhilov
- Tony Curran – Lugo Elson

=== Russian Federation ===
- Nick Jameson – President Yuri Suvarov
- Graham McTavish – Mikhail Novakovich
- Joel Bissonnette – Pavel Tokarev

=== Miscellaneous characters ===
- Benito Martinez – Victor Aruz
- Clayne Crawford – Kevin Wade
- Jennifer Westfeldt – Meredith Reed
- Michael Filipowich – Nick Coughlin
- Mare Winningham – Elaine Al-Zacar
- Stephen Root – Bill Prady
- D. B. Sweeney – Mark Bledsoe
- Michael Madsen – Jim Ricker
- Joe Nieves – NYPD Officer James "Jim" Koernig
- Sandra Purpuro – Maggie Koernig
- Domenick Lombardozzi – NYPD Officer John Mazoni
- Johnny Wu – NYPD Officer Philip Lu
- Eli Goodman – Dr. Joel Levine
- Thomas Ryan – Gary Klausner
- Alex Carter – Nantz

== 24: Live Another Day ==
=== Bauer and associates ===
- Kiefer Sutherland – Jack Bauer
- Branko Tomović – Belcheck

=== CIA London ===
- Yvonne Strahovski – Kate Morgan
- Gbenga Akinnagbe – Erik Ritter
- Giles Matthey – Jordan Reed
- Benjamin Bratt – Steve Navarro
- Adam Sinclair – Gavin Leonard
- Christina Chong – Mariana

=== Federal Government officials, employees and associates ===
- William Devane – President James Heller
- Tate Donovan – Chief of Staff Mark Boudreau
- Kim Raver – Audrey Boudreau
- Ross McCall – Ron Clark
- Colin Salmon – General Coburn
- John Boyega – First Lieutenant Chris Tanner
- Duncan Pow – Captain Greg Denovo

=== United Kingdom officials, employees and associates ===
- Stephen Fry – Prime Minister Alastair Davies
- Miranda Raison – Caroline Fowlds
- James Puddephatt – Ken

=== Open Cell ===
- Mary Lynn Rajskub – Chloe O'Brian
- Michael Wincott – Adrian Cross
- Joseph Millson – Derrick Yates
- Mandeep Dhillon – Chell
- Charles Furness – Pete

=== Drone terrorist plot ===
- Michelle Fairley – Margot Al-Harazi
- Emily Berrington – Simone Al-Harazi
- Liam Garrigan – Ian Al-Harazi
- Sacha Dhawan – Naveed Shabazz

=== Russian Federation ===
- Stanley Townsend – Anatol Stolnavich

=== Miscellaneous characters ===
- Tzi Ma – Cheng Zhi
- Alex Lanipekun – James Harman
- Tamer Hassan – Aron Bashir/Basher
- Julian Moore-Cook – Marine #1

== List of U.S. presidents ==
Season	Year	Main Location	Time	Election	President	Actor/Actress	VP	Actor	Party
1	April 23	Los Angeles	12:00 a.m. – 12:00 a.m.	N	No U.S. President mentioned				
2	+ 18 months	Los Angeles	8:00 a.m. – 4:58:45 a.m.	+ 1	David Palmer	Dennis Haysbert	Jim Prescott	Alan Dale	Democratic
2	+ 18 months	Los Angeles	4:58:45 a.m. – 7:48:23 a.m.	+ 1	Jim Prescott	Alan Dale	Vacant		Democratic
2	+ 18 months	Los Angeles	7:48:23 a.m. – 8:00 a.m.	+ 1	David Palmer	Dennis Haysbert	Jim Prescott	Alan Dale	Democratic
3	+ 36 months	Los Angeles	1:00 p.m. – 1:00 p.m.	+ 1	David Palmer	Dennis Haysbert	Jim Prescott	Alan Dale	Democratic
4 prequel	+ 3 months	Los Angeles		+ 2	John Keeler	Geoff Pierson	Charles Logan	Gregory Itzin	Republican
4 prequel	+ 12 months			+ 2	John Keeler	Geoff Pierson	Charles Logan	Gregory Itzin	Republican
4 prequel	+ 3 months	Los Angeles		+ 2	John Keeler	Geoff Pierson	Charles Logan	Gregory Itzin	Republican
4	+ 6 hours	Los Angeles	7:00 a.m. – 11:59:12 a.m.	+ 2	John Keeler	Geoff Pierson	Charles Logan	Gregory Itzin	Republican
4	+ 6 hours	Los Angeles	11:59:12 a.m. – 7:00 a.m.	+ 2	Charles Logan	Gregory Itzin	Vacant		Republican
5 prequel	+ 12 months	Chicago	1:47:00 p.m. – 1:54:23 p.m.	+ 2	Charles Logan	Gregory Itzin	Not mentioned		Republican
5	+ 6 months	Los Angeles	7:00 a.m. – 7:00 a.m.	+ 2	Charles Logan	Gregory Itzin	Hal Gardner	Ray Wise	Republican
6 prequel	+ 7 months	China		+ 2	Hal Gardner	Ray Wise	Not mentioned		Republican
6	+ 13 months	Los Angeles	6:00 a.m. – 11:54 a.m.	+ 3	Wayne Palmer	DB Woodside	Noah Daniels	Powers Boothe	Democratic
6	+ 13 months	Los Angeles	11:54 a.m. – 6:00 a.m.	+ 3	Noah Daniels	Powers Boothe	Vacant		Democratic
Debrief	+ 15 hours	Los Angeles	9:00 p.m. – 10:38:29 p.m.	+ 3	Noah Daniels	Powers Boothe	Vacant		Democratic
Redemption	+ 45 months	Sangala	3:00 p.m. – 4:57:14 p.m.	+ 3	Noah Daniels	Powers Boothe	Not mentioned		Democratic
Redemption	+ 45 months	Sangala	4:57:14 p.m. – 5:00 p.m.	+ 4	Allison Taylor	Cherry Jones	Mitchell Hayworth	Cameron Daddo	Republican
7	+ 2 months	Washington, D.C.	8:00 a.m. – 8:00 a.m.	+ 4	Allison Taylor	Cherry Jones	Mitchell Hayworth	Cameron Daddo	Republican
8	+ 18 months	New York City	4:00 p.m. – 4:00 p.m.	+ 4	Allison Taylor	Cherry Jones	Not mentioned		Republican
Chloe's Arrest	+ 1 day			+ 4	No U.S. President mentioned				Republican
Live Another Day	+ 48 months	London	11:00 a.m. – 11:00 a.m.	+ 5	James Heller	William Devane	Not mentioned		Republican
Solitary	+ 30 months			+ 6	No U.S. President mentioned				
Legacy	+ 6 months	Washington, D.C.	12:00 p.m. – 12:00 p.m.	+ 6	No U.S. President mentioned				
