= Chloe O'Brian =

Fictional character

- 24 character
- First appearance: Day 3 – Episode 1
- Last appearance: Live Another Day – Episode 12
- Portrayed by: Mary Lynn Rajskub
- Days: 3, 4, 5, 6, 7, 8, 9
- Other Appearances: 24: The Game

In-universe information
- Spouse: Morris O'Brian (Divorced then re-married)
- Significant others: Milo Pressman; Spenser Wolff

Chloe O'Brian is a fictional character played by actress Mary Lynn Rajskub on the US television series 24. An analyst at CTU Los Angeles (and later New York), she is Jack Bauer's most trusted colleague, often doing unconventional and unauthorized favors for him, even at personal risk to herself. As O'Brian, Rajskub appeared in 125 episodes of 24, more than any other actor except series star Kiefer Sutherland, who appeared in all 204 episodes of the series. UGO.com named her one of the best TV nerds. AOL named her one of the 100 Most Memorable Female TV Characters.

== Characteristics ==
O'Brian is exceptionally intelligent; in particular she displays extraordinary mastery of computer science. Spending most of her time behind a computer terminal, she is rarely sent on field assignments; however, she has demonstrated proficiency with weapons in Day 4, 5, and 8. She works very well under pressure, yet it is obvious when she is under pressure, that she has always demonstrated a degree of social awkwardness. Despite her lack of social graces, Chloe has gained several friends at CTU and has shown to have a great deal of loyalty to them. She helped CTU Agent Chase Edmunds take care of his daughter from a previous relationship after the child's mother abandoned Chase and their child. She even tried to pass the child off as her own, so as to keep Chase's then-girlfriend, Kim Bauer, from knowing.

In interviews to promote the show's return to Fox with the miniseries, 24: Live Another Day, actor Kiefer Sutherland revealed that Rajskub would be reprising Chloe, but hinted that the relationship between her and Jack Bauer would be more adversarial than before. She also suggested that the reason for this was possibly related to her actions during the show's final season.

== Appearances ==
=== 24: Season 3 ===
Introduced in the third season of the series, Chloe O'Brian is a senior analyst at CTU. Her other experience at CTU includes Intelligence Agent and Internet Protocol Manager. She received her education at the University of California-Davis, having received her BSc in Computer Science. In 24: The Game, it is revealed that before coming to CTU Los Angeles, she worked at CTU: Washington DC with Chase Edmunds.

=== 24: Season 4 ===
Chloe continues to work at CTU as an analyst. She continues to help Jack (at the time, not a member of CTU) to follow the terrorists while risking her career. She is detained and fired when Director of CTU Los Angeles Erin Driscoll (the person who fired Jack) discovered Chloe is helping Jack behind her back.

When Driscoll resigns and Michelle Dessler steps in, she is reinstated since none of the other CTU employees were as skilled as Chloe was. When the crisis ends later in the day, she, along with Michelle Dessler, Tony Almeida and former President David Palmer, help Jack to fake his death.

=== 24: Season 5 ===
Chloe is given a love interest, a subordinate named Spenser Wolff. She finds out later that Spenser is a mole (albeit unknowingly), and turns him in immediately. He later states he is not a mole but at CTU as an Internal Affairs investigator.

Chloe is the only person who had continual contact with Jack since he faked his death. Chloe is also the only one involved in the plot to fake his death to survive from murder attempts committed by unknown parties (later discovered to be President Charles Logan and Jack's brother, Graem Bauer), narrowly escaping a car bomb and a subsequent attack by the terrorists who planted the bomb.

She is briefly arrested for aiding Jack, though her skills with computers allow her to avoid the consequences of her actions and returns to work at CTU. Sadly, Edgar Stiles does not survive the events of Day 5 and Chloe watches him die through the glass door. Chloe is visibly shaken by the death of one of her few best friends and regrets having been short with him earlier that day.

Chloe is later forced to work directly against her superiors in Homeland Security in order to help Audrey and Jack. She hacks into a CTU server and interferes with a satellite tracking Audrey's car. She is able to slip into the bathroom just before being caught red handed, but Homeland Security bureaucrat Miles Papazian is very suspicious that she is deliberately interfering with their orders to attempt to apprehend Jack, at that time subject to a warrant by President Logan.

Homeland Security tricks Chloe into calling a pay phone where Audrey is currently located. They track the call to Van Nuys Airport and alert President Logan that they have located Bauer. Chloe is then put into custody by Miles. However, Chloe steals his keycard and escapes from detention. She grabs her laptop and leaves CTU. When leaving she encounters Shari Rothenburg but Chloe blackmails her to stay quiet. Chloe works with Buchanan from his home but Papazian is able to track her. Karen Hayes contacts Bill to alert them that Papazian has sent a team to arrest Chloe and that she has mere minutes to leave the house.

Chloe is able to escape and continues to aid Jack from a nearby hotel. Combined with Hayes, she works to help Jack locate the passenger on a private plane in possession of the audio tape implicating Logan in Palmer's death. Eventually she confirms that it is the co-pilot who has the tape. Hayes and Buchanan bring Chloe back to CTU shortly thereafter to help Jack make an emergency landing, because Logan has ordered an F18 to shoot down the plane. Bill Buchanan is able to locate a 4000 ft. strip on a Los Angeles Highway to use for a landing. Jack eventually lands safely and escapes from Logan's marine force with the help of Curtis Manning. Once Jack gets the audio tape back to CTU, Chloe sets to work preparing the audio tape for the United States Attorney General. Unfortunately, unbeknownst to Chloe, Miles destroys the digital recording while she is distracted.

In the final hours of Day 5, Chloe aids Jack in preventing Bierko from firing missiles from a Russian submarine. After the mission ends successfully, Jack tells her that he is going to attempt to get a confession from Logan and will need her help. With help from Mike Novick, Chloe is able to get Jack the necessary papers to board the presidential helicopter as a co-pilot. After Jack places a listening device on Logan that records his confession to Martha, Chloe transmits the recording to the Attorney General.

When the crisis ends, Bill brings her something from Edgar's locker, a picture of Chloe and Edgar together. An emotionally spent Chloe leaves CTU for the day with her ex-husband Morris O'Brian, whom she had enlisted to help her at CTU.

=== 24: Season 6 ===
After the failed assassination of Assad via military helicopter, Chloe found an image of Jack rescuing the terrorist. She shared the information with Bill Buchanan, who conceded that from Jack's perspective, a rescue was the right action. Chloe suggests if Jack is right, then Fayed should be monitored. Buchanan agrees, and subsequently CTU obtains information that Fayed was indeed behind the latest waves of bombings.

Chloe is later able to recover data from the hard drive of one of Fayed's men that he was particularly interested in a specific set of terrorists Fayed demanded be set free. Later, after Jack notices Curtis Manning's demeanor around Assad, asks her to find out if there is a past connection between the two men. She later confirms that Manning's military unit took heavy losses at Assad's hands and that Assad beheaded two members of Manning's unit on television. Jack uses that information to prevent Manning from killing Assad, though the price is Manning's life.

When chatter is intercepted between Fayed and Darren McCarthy, a profile of the man able to arm the four remaining suitcase nukes is sent, though the message is badly degraded. Morris works on reconstructing the image, while Milo finds information that states Morris's brother has been exposed to the radiation from the Valencia bomb and is in a hospital. Chloe informs him, but while Morris wants to go to his brother's side at once, Chloe insists he retrieve the data. After Morris downloads an illegal program that will speed up the reconstruction of the data, he leaves, and Chloe kisses him goodbye. Chloe then monitors the retrieval to find that the engineer was, in fact, Morris. Bill has her call Morris via cell phone with Jack on the line, and Chloe jumps nervously after hearing gunfire erupt as McCarthy corners and kidnaps Morris from his car and put into his with the help of McCarthy's girlfriend, Rita.

Chloe works to help locate Morris, who was tortured by Fayed into programming a device which would allow the detonation of the suitcase nukes. Chloe gives Jack the needed information in how to disable the suitcase nuke Fayed left behind after CTU assaulted his safe house. Afterwards, Jack and Chloe have a reunion at CTU where she thanks him for saving Morris's life, and she tells him she's glad Fayed didn't kill him. Jack thanks her for everything. She later visits Morris in the infirmary, but her attempts at compassion are dismissed by Morris's claims that he's responsible for Fayed ability to arm the remaining suitcase nukes. He tells her to go away. She later goes back to say they have a lead, and asks him to return to duty. He dismisses it as a ruse to get him to go back to work, and admits he's a coward. Chloe retorts he's pissing her off, and Morris says she can add it to his list of failings. Chloe slaps him, and he tells her if she wants to save somebody, save somebody who is worth saving. She tries to slap him again, but he blocks it. She tells Morris to stop feeling sorry for himself and get back to work.

Later, she finds Morris is not at his work station. She investigates his palmtop, and calls his sponsor, who says she hasn't been in touch with Morris for years. Chloe confronts Morris in the men's room. He tells her he has a different sponsor now – who he did speak to on the phone – and berates Chloe for being 'obsessive' about his contacts. However, when Chloe leaves, he drains what is left of a bottle of whiskey down the sink.

When Milo suspects that Morris has been drinking again, he asks Chloe to check Morris for any signs of alcohol. She reluctantly agrees, and walks over to him and kissed him, when he asked "What was that for?" she responded by saying "Just checking your breath."

Later, she helps Jack to steal the bomb's schematics. However, Morris discovers her act and forces her to tell Bill. When Bill orders everyone to help Jack Bauer under presidential order, he excludes her saying that "I don't trust you" but he changes his mind in the next episode when he tells her he needs his best people working on this.

Chloe is apparently upset and angry at Morris for forcing her to tell Bill the truth and the pair argue until Chloe's anger gets the better of her and she throws the fact that he armed nuclear weapons for terrorists, back in his face. Chloe insists that she didn't mean it but Morris puts in for a transfer out of Com and to no longer work aside Chloe. She is visibly upset and scolds herself for pushing the issue too far. Later, she attempts to apologize, but Morris tells her that their relationship is over. As Morris goes back to work, Chloe bursts into tears. Minutes later, Nadia notices that Chloe is not at her station and Morris claims not to know where she is.

Later, Chloe confronts Morris over his decision to break up. Morris tells Chloe that he ended their relationship because he felt that neither of them would be able to move past the fact that he had armed the nuclear weapons. Soon afterwards, CTU came under attack and the entire staff, including Chloe, was taken hostage. Eventually Nadia, Jack, and Morris attacked the men holding them hostage and Chloe commended Nadia on her bravery.

While at work, Chloe faints and is taken to the CTU medical department. It was revealed near the end of the final episode that she is pregnant. Morris, presumably the father, appears pleased at the news, and the two resume their relationship once again (in typical Morris fashion, he dismisses their breakup with a "Sod that!" comment).

=== 24: Season 7 ===
Chloe does not appear in 24: Redemption, the two-hour TV prequel, which aired on Sunday, November 23, 2008, she and Bill Buchanan first appear in the third episode of the season.

Actress Mary Lynn Rajskub revealed her role in the upcoming seventh season: “I show up, time has passed and I have a 4-year-old and a wedding ring, [and I'm] calling Morris (Carlo Rota) while I'm busy. So far he's taking care of the baby, but he'll be around." "We're a rogue operation – we are working outside of the government to uncover the conspiracy within the government." When asked by Matobo if she is a federal agent, she replies, "No, I'm a stay-at-home-mom." She and Morris have named their son Prescott.

Kiefer Sutherland commented "Chloe is crankier than ever; the dammit count is pretty high."

Chloe was working with Bill Buchanan and Tony Almeida who was undercover with Emerson's gang, to uncover the conspiracy within the US government who had been supporting General Juma and his regime in Sangala, Africa. Chloe co-ordinates numerous operations for the team, until later they become compromised through their efforts to secure the CIP device used by Juma's henchman, Dubaku to launch attacks on America. After this Chloe collaborates with the FBI, working from their headquarters in Washington.

Later on, after Dubaku is captured and the threat seemingly ended, Jack is informed by Tony of another impending attack. Jack enlists Chloe's help while he follows a lead on Ryan Burnett — a US-based conspirator named as a traitor in the files retrieved from Dubaku. Jack asks Chloe to erase Burnett's name from the files to buy him time to get to Burnett and interrogate him. Janis Gold, one of the FBI's analysts, becomes suspicious of Chloe's and finds out what she has done. Janis reports her to Agent Larry Moss, who has Chloe arrested and detained. Chloe is later released when her husband Morris cuts an immunity deal for her, and the two go home to get some sleep. This plot development was partially to work around Rajskub's pregnancy. In earlier episodes, "I sit behind my computer and every time I stand up, they yell cut, and bring in a body double." Chloe's arrest allowed her to be temporarily written out of the show so that Rajskub could go on maternity leave; meanwhile, Morris takes over her role in the story.

Chloe is called back into action by Jack at around 3:30 AM, when CTU's servers are dug out of storage and made available for FBI use; Chloe is (of course) the person best suited to integrating them and getting them running. Jack tells her that Tony has betrayed them, but (as of 4 AM) has not informed her of his own condition. Jack eventually informed her of his condition, but asked her to remain focused and help them find Tony and the pathogen. Thanks to Chloe's help, Jack is able to find and capture Tony. However, the tables are turned and Jack is kidnapped by Tony. When Kim recovers a laptop from one of Tony's lackeys, Chloe is able to track Jack's location and save him.

At the 7:30 am mark, Chloe has decided to stay and be there for Jack in his final hours.

=== 24: Season 8 ===
In Season 8, Chloe is re-employed by the revived CTU, but is at times struggling with the new hardware, software and interfaces; dialogue between her and Head of CTU Brian Hastings (Mykelti Williamson) indicates that Morris has lost his job and Chloe is keeping the family afloat. She is also subordinate to Dana Walsh (Katee Sackhoff), who holds Chloe's usual position of Head Analyst, causing the insecure Chloe additional stress.

Chloe quickly goes head-to-head with her co-workers when evidence is uncovered that implicates journalist Meredith Reed (Jennifer Westfeldt) in an assassination plot against President Omar Hassan (Anil Kapoor). Chloe is suspicious of the ease with which CTU obtained this evidence, feeling that Reed might be being framed by actual conspirators. Hastings refuses to follow up on her suspicions, even threatening her job if she takes time to investigate, so she recruits Jack to do it instead. As it turns out, Chloe's instincts are proved correct, leading CTU to the actual assassin, and Hastings formally apologizes and commends her actions in the official logs. Later, after Dana's behavior in relation to former associate Kevin Wade (Clayne Crawford) affects her job performance, Chloe is then reinstated to Head Analyst, with Dana now reporting to her.

In the 183rd episode of the show (Season 8, 6:00 am – 7:00 am), Chloe surpassed Tony Almeida (Carlos Bernard)'s episode count of 115, becoming the character who has appeared in the most episodes of the show other than Jack Bauer. Perhaps appropriately, just after 8 am that day, Chloe is promoted to (Acting) Director of CTU, replacing Hastings. This puts Chloe in an abnormal position in regard to Jack: normally she helps him carry out clandestine operations in defiance of their mutual boss, but now she is the boss he is defying. This new dynamic is put to the test within two hours of her promotion, when Jack steals a helicopter to pursue justice in direct defiance of orders from President Allison Taylor (Cherry Jones). Chloe sticks with the responsibilities of her position, ordering pursuit instead of supporting Jack; this is the first time in several years the two have pursued clashing goals.

At the end of the 8th season (3:00 pm to 4:00 pm), Chloe manages to talk Jack out of assassinating the Russian president in revenge of a friend's murder earlier that day and gets him to agree to expose the conspiracy her way. Jack orders Chloe to shoot him in order to free herself from suspicion and to expose the cover up of Hassan's murder. Chloe refuses to go through with it until Jack points the gun at his own head, forcing her to either shoot him or having him kill himself. She shoots him in the shoulder. Coordinating with Cole Ortiz, she tries to get evidence collected by Jack vital to expose the cover up, but is stopped by Jason Pillar and CTU. After Jack is saved from death by President Alison Taylor's order, he calls Chloe and makes her promise to protect Jack's family, and along with President Taylor, plans to buy him as much time as she can for him to flee the country before the Americans and Russians come after him for his actions. Jack thanks her for all she has done for him since she joined CTU and forgives her for her actions during the day. Chloe has the distinction of speaking the final line in the series by saying "shut it down" to Arlo Glass in regards to the CTU drone. As Jack looks one last time towards CTU's monitoring, Chloe gives one final tearful look to Jack in CTU's monitor screen before the clock counts down to zero.

In the Season 8 DVD bonuses, it is revealed that Chloe was arrested soon after the events of Day 8 by the FBI for covering up Jack's escape. She returned in the miniseries 24: Live Another Day, which started airing in May 2014.

=== 24: Live Another Day ===
In 24: Live Another Day, four years after the end of Day 8, Chloe is situated in London and has taken to a new, darker appearance. Since being arrested for helping Jack escape, she has become a member of the free information movement and is working with a hacker group named Open Cell, which devotes itself to exposing government secrets. Her new goals are a stark contrast to the loyal CTU agent Chloe once was; it is suggested she was betrayed by the American government, at one point telling Jack not to judge her "after what [she's] been through."

At the start of the miniseries, she was being detained by the CIA for leaking thousands of classified DOD documents. Jack, allowing himself to be captured to gain access to the facility, frees her and then follows her to the hideout of Open Cell's leader, hacker Adrian Cross (Michael Wincott). Chloe convinces her colleagues to assist Jack in locating Derrick Yates (Joseph Millson), a former member of their movement who Jack believes to be involved in a planned assassination attempt on President James Heller (William Devane). By this time, Yates had already managed to commandeer a U.S. drone and fire upon a military convoy in Afghanistan, killing two American and two British soldiers. Together, Jack and Chloe track Yates to an apartment complex, but are circumvented by the CIA's efforts to apprehend them. After losing Yates, Jack evades capture and escapes with Chloe.

In the show's third episode, Jack discovers Yates' corpse, left behind by his female companion, Simone Al-Harazi (Emily Berrington). Chloe loses sight of Al-Harazi after being distracted by a passing family, after which she reveals to Jack that Morris and Prescott were killed as a result of her knowledge of Jack's disappearance following Day 8. Together, they return to Open Cell's headquarters in order to establish a cover for Jack to infiltrate the U.S. embassy in London and question Lieutenant Chris Tanner (John Boyega), the man Yates had framed for the drone attack. However, Cross betrays Jack by botching Jack's cover; Chloe senses something amiss and warns him to escape, giving Jack enough time to create a diversion and enter the embassy.

Throughout the rest of the day Chloe aids Jack as he searches for Margot Al-Harazi. Chloe manages to hack into Al-Harazi's video feed from her drone's cameras and fake President Heller's death and then track her with Adrian Cross' help. Jack kills Al-Harazi and stops an attack on Waterloo station, but Chloe refuses to have anything more to do with him, telling Jack it was good working with him again before rejoining Cross.

After Cross receives the override device from Steve Navarro, Chloe tries to steal it but is forced by Cross to give it back. She is shocked to discover that Cross is working with Jack's old enemy Cheng Zhi who forces Chloe to fix the device and murders Cross who admits that he learned that the death of Morris and Prescott were actually an accident and he kept it from her so she wouldn't leave him. A horrified Chloe can only watch as Cheng uses the override device to order the sinking of a Chinese aircraft carrier by a United States submarine to spark a war between the two countries, but manages to leave a recording of Cheng behind so that Jack knows who is behind everything. As she is being transported, Chloe escapes and contacts Jack. Remorseful over her decisions, Chloe offers Jack her help in guiding him through Cheng's hideout, telling him she's the only friend he's got left. Reluctant to trust her, Jack agrees. Chloe runs satellite surveillance for Jack and Belcheck, but they lose contact with her shortly before Jack captures Cheng. Shortly afterwards, Jack gets a call from the Russians to trade himself for Chloe who they have kidnapped.

The next morning, Jack meets with the Russians and willingly trades himself for Chloe and his family's safety. Before leaving, Jack affirms that Chloe is his best friend and asks her to look after Kim. As Jack leaves with the Russians, a reluctant Chloe drives away with Belcheck.

== Project CHLOE ==
Project CHLOE, a Department of Homeland Security surveillance technology development program aimed at protecting airliners from terrorist missiles, was named after Chloe O'Brian because 24 is former Homeland Security Secretary Michael Chertoff's favorite show.
