= Curtis Manning =

Curtis Manning can refer to:

- Curtis Manning (24 character), fictional character in the TV series 24
- Curtis Manning (lacrosse) (born 1987), Canadian box lacrosse player
