= Sarah Clarke =

American actress

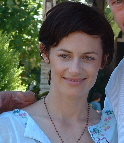
- Clarke on the set of 24 in 2002
- Born: St. Louis, Missouri, U.S.
- Other names: Sarah Berkeley; Sarah Lively
- Occupation: Actress
- Years active: 2000–present
- Spouse: Xander Berkeley (m. 2002)
- Children: 2

Sarah Clarke is an American actress, best known for her role as Nina Myers on 24, and also for her roles as Renée Dwyer, Bella Swan's mother, in the 2008 film Twilight, Erin McGuire on the short-lived TV show Trust Me, and CIA Officer Lena Smith on the show Covert Affairs. She also starred as Eleanor Wish in the police procedural drama Bosch.

== Early life ==
Clarke was born in St. Louis, Missouri, the daughter of Ernest Clarke, an engineer, and Carolyn, a homemaker.

Clarke attended John Burroughs School in St. Louis, Missouri (along with Mad Men star Jon Hamm, her prom date), and Indiana University Bloomington studying Fine Arts and Italian. She dated fellow actor Paul Rudd for a short time. While a student at Indiana University, Clarke became a member of the Kappa Alpha Theta sorority. She was initiated into the Beta chapter in 1990.

Clarke became interested in acting while studying abroad during her senior year in Bologna, Italy. Upon returning to the United States, she began studying architectural photography. She received free acting lessons in return for taking photographs of a cultural arts center, and she studied acting at Circle in the Square Theatre School, Axis Theater Company, and The Willow Cabin Theatre Company.

== Career ==
Clarke began her acting career with an appearance in a 1999 award-winning commercial for Volkswagen. She followed this with a role in the 2000 short film Pas de deux and received an Outstanding Performance award at the Brooklyn Film Festival. Clarke's career soon blossomed with minor roles, including films All About George in 2000 and The Accident in 2001, as well as television shows such as Ed and Sex and the City.

In 2001, Clarke auditioned for the role of CTU agent Nina Myers on 24. She won the role on the day that filming began. The wardrobe department did not have time to fit her, so she had to wear her own outfit for the entire season of filming. In her three seasons with the show, Clarke was featured in a total of 36 episodes. Clarke won a Golden Satellite Award for Best Performance by an Actress in a Supporting Role in a Drama Series for this role. Clarke also lent her voice to 24: The Game, as her 24 character, Nina Myers.

Clarke has guest-starred on House and Life. She played Renée Dwyer, Bella Swan's mother, in Twilight. She accepted a leading role on the TNT series Trust Me, opposite Eric McCormack and Thomas Cavanagh. The series premiered on January 26, 2009 to positive reviews, though it was cancelled after one season due to declining ratings. In 2010, Clarke reprised her role as Renée Dwyer in Eclipse, the third movie in the Twilight series. In 2013, she was cast as Marla Jameson in the US version of The Tomorrow People.

== Personal life ==
Clarke met her husband, Xander Berkeley, while on the set of 24 (he played her supervisor, George Mason) and they were married in September 2002, a year after meeting. They have two daughters.

== Filmography ==
=== Film ===
Year	Title	Role	Notes
2000	Interior. Bedroom – Night	Heather Cinicci	Short film
2000	Pas de deux	The Clown	
2000	All About George	Catherine	Short film
2001	The Accident	Reeny	Short film
2002	Emmett's Mark	Sarah	
2003	Thirteen	Birdie	
2003	The Third Date	Katrina	Short film
2004	Human Error	Company Spokesperson	
2005	Happy Endings	Diane	
2005	Psychic Driving	Selma	Short film
2006	The Lather Effect	Claire	
2007	The Colony	Olga	Short film
2008	Twilight	Renée Dwyer	
2009	Women in Trouble	Maxine McPherson	
2010	Below the Beltway	Anne	
2010	The Twilight Saga: Eclipse	Renée Dwyer	
2010	Bedrooms	Janet	
2011	The Twilight Saga: Breaking Dawn – Part 1	Renée Dwyer	
2012	A Quick Jog	Jogger	Short film
2012	The Twilight Saga: Breaking Dawn – Part 2	Renée Dwyer	
2016	Punk's Dead	Trish	
2017	Shot	Dr. Fisher	
2017	Staring at the Sun	Dolly Alexander	
2018	The Maestro	Clara Castelnuovo-Tedesco	
2021	CODA	Tanya	

=== Television ===
Year	Title	Role	Notes
2000	Sex and the City	Melinda Peters	"Politically Erect" (billed as Sarah Lively)
2001	Ed	Kara Parsons	"The Test"
2001–2004	24	Nina Myers	Main role
2003	Karen Sisco	Barbara Simmons	"The One That Got Away"
2005	House	Carly Forlano	"Control"
2005	Las Vegas	Olivia Duchey	"The Big Ed De-cline", "The Real McCoy"
2006	A House Divided	Jackie	TV film
2006	Commander in Chief	Christine Chambers	"Unfinished Business"
2007	Life	Mary Ann Farmer	"A Civil War"
2007	Alibi	Sarah Winters	TV film
2008	Wainy Days	Rebecca	"Rebecca"
2008	The Cleaner	Lauren Keenan	"To Catch a Fed"
2009	Trust Me	Erin McGuire	Main role
2009–2011	Men of a Certain Age	Dory	Recurring role
2010	The Booth at the End	Sister Carmel	Recurring role
2011–2012	Nikita	Katya Udinov	3 episodes
2012	Covert Affairs	Lena Smith	Recurring role
2013–2014	The Tomorrow People	Marla Jameson	Recurring role
2014	Line of Sight	Dot Bernt	TV film
2015	Couch Surfing USA	Mary	TV series
2015–2018	Bosch	Eleanor Wish	Main role
2016	NCIS	Tess Monroe	2 episodes
2017	Law & Order: Special Victims Unit	Cynthia Hendricks	"Decline and Fall"
2025	FBI	Senator Charlotte Hirsch	"Manifest"

=== Video games ===
Year	Title	Role
2006	24: The Game	Nina Myers (voice)
