= Jacqui Maxwell =

Australian actress (born 1981)

- Born: Sydney, Australia
- Occupation: Actress
- Years active: 2001–2005

Jacqui Maxwell is an Australian retired actress best known for playing Annette in The Dukes of Hazzard and various roles in Gilmore Girls.

== Notable film appearances ==
- The Dukes of Hazzard (2005) as Annette
- Stories of Lost Souls (2001) in the Episode "The Same"

== TV appearances ==
- Charmed (2005; one episode) as Vampire Queen
- CSI: Crime Scene Investigation (2004: one episode) as Vampire #2, Alice, and Luminessa
- 24 (2001; six episodes) as Janet York
- Gilmore Girls (2001; two episodes) as Summer
