= The Lather Effect =

- Directed by: Sarah Kelly
- Written by: Sarah Kelly; Tim Talbott
- Produced by: Rachel Rothman; Gary Bryman; Mike Jackson
- Starring: Connie Britton; Sarah Clarke; Tate Donovan; Peter Facinelli; David Herman; Caitlin Keats; William Mapother; Ione Skye; Eric Stoltz
- Cinematography: Eric Haase
- Edited by: Darren Ayres
- Music by: Dominic Kelly
- Production company: Tangerine Pictures
- Distributed by: Tycoon Entertainment
- Release date: June 26, 2006 (Los Angeles)
- Running time: 92 minutes
- Country: United States
- Language: English

The Lather Effect is a 2006 American comedy drama film written by Sarah Kelly and Tim Talbott, directed by Kelly and starring Connie Britton, Sarah Clarke, Tate Donovan, Peter Facinelli, David Herman, Caitlin Keats, William Mapother, Ione Skye and Eric Stoltz.

== Cast ==
- Connie Britton as Valinda
- Sarah Clarke as Claire
- Tate Donovan as Will
- David Herman as Corey
- Peter Facinelli as Danny
- Caitlin Keats as Katrina
- William Mapother as Jack
- Ione Skye as Zoey
- Eric Stoltz as Mickey

== Release ==
The film was released at the Los Angeles Film Festival on June 26, 2006.

== Reception ==
John Anderson of Variety gave the film a mixed review and wrote, "Audiences connected to a particular place, time and soundtrack may respond well. Others will feel they weren't invited to the party."

Brandon Ciampaglia of IGN gave the film a negative review and wrote, "The Lather Effect had potential but falls short of becoming the kind of film that would appeal to fans of Crowe and Hughes."
