= Powers Boothe =

American actor (1948–2017)

- Boothe in Guyana Tragedy: The Story of Jim Jones, 1981
- Born: Powers Allen Boothe; June 1, 1948; Snyder, Texas, U.S.
- Died: May 14, 2017 (aged 68); Los Angeles, California, U.S.
- Education: Texas State University (BA); Southern Methodist University (MFA)
- Occupation: Actor
- Years active: 1974–2017
- Spouse: Pamela Cole (m. 1969)
- Children: 2

Powers Allen Boothe (June 1, 1948 – May 14, 2017) was an American actor known for his commanding character actor roles on film and television. He received a Primetime Emmy Award and nominations for two Screen Actors Guild Awards.

He won a Primetime Emmy Award for Outstanding Lead Actor in a Limited Series or Movie for his portrayal of Jim Jones in Guyana Tragedy: The Story of Jim Jones (1980). He also played saloon owner Cy Tolliver on Deadwood from 2004 to 2006, President Noah Daniels on 24 in 2007, and Lamar Wyatt in Nashville from 2012 to 2014. He also appeared in the limited series Hatfields & McCoys (2012).

He is also known for his performances as "Curly Bill" Brocius in the western Tombstone (1993) and Alexander Haig in historical drama Nixon (1995). Other notable film roles include Southern Comfort (1981), Red Dawn (1984), The Emerald Forest (1985), Stalingrad (1990), Blue Sky (1994), Sudden Death (1995), Frailty (2001), and Sin City (2005).

He portrayed Gideon Malick in the Marvel Cinematic Universe's The Avengers (2012), and in the ABC series Agents of S.H.I.E.L.D. from 2015 to 2016. He was also the voice of Gorilla Grodd in Justice League and Justice League Unlimited.

== Early life ==
Boothe, the youngest of three boys, was born June 1, 1948, at home on a cotton farm in Snyder, Texas, to Merrill Vestal Boothe, a rancher, and his wife Emily (née Reeves) Boothe. His father named him after his best friend, who had been killed in World War II.

Boothe attended Snyder High School, where he played football and appeared in school plays. He was the first in his family to go beyond high school, graduating with a Bachelor of Arts degree from Southwest Texas State University in San Marcos, and earning a Master of Fine Arts degree in Drama from Southern Methodist University in University Park, Texas.

== Career ==
After graduating from Southwest Texas State University in San Marcos, Texas, Boothe joined the repertory company of the Oregon Shakespeare Festival, with roles in Henry IV, Part 2 (portraying Henry IV of England), Troilus and Cressida, and others. His New York City stage debut was in the 1974 Lincoln Center production of Richard III. Five years later, his Broadway theater debut came in a starring role in the one-act play Lone Star, written by James McLure.

Boothe as Jim Jones in Guyana Tragedy: The Story of Jim Jones, 1980

Boothe first came to national attention in 1980, playing Jim Jones in the CBS TV film Guyana Tragedy: The Story of Jim Jones. Boothe's portrayal of the crazed cult leader received critical acclaim. In Time's story on the production, Boothe was praised: "There is one extraordinary performance. A young actor named Powers Boothe captures all the charisma and evil of 'Dad', Jim Jones." Boothe won the Emmy Award for his role, beating out veterans Henry Fonda and Jason Robards. As the Screen Actors Guild were on strike in the fall of 1980, he was the only actor to cross picket lines to attend the ceremonies and accept his award, saying at the time, "This may be either the bravest moment of my career or the dumbest."

Boothe portrayed Philip Marlowe in a TV series based on Raymond Chandler's short stories for HBO in the 1980s. He appeared in such films as Southern Comfort, A Breed Apart, Red Dawn, The Emerald Forest, Rapid Fire and Extreme Prejudice, as well as the HBO films Into the Homeland and By Dawn's Early Light. In 1989, Boothe appeared in the Mosfilm production of "Stalingrad", in which he played the role of General Chuikov, commander of the Soviet 62nd Army. Additionally, he appeared in the 1990 CBS-TV film Family of Spies, in which he played traitor Navy Officer John Walker. Boothe portrayed Curly Bill Brocius in the hit 1993 Western Tombstone, the disloyal senior Army officer in Blue Sky (opposite Jessica Lange's Oscar-winning performance), and the sinister lead terrorist in Sudden Death. He was also part of the large ensemble casts for Oliver Stone's Nixon (as Chief of Staff Alexander Haig) and U Turn (as the town sheriff).

In 2001, he starred as Flavius Aëtius, the Roman general in charge of stopping the Hun invasion in the made-for-TV miniseries Attila. Boothe played a featured role as brothel-owner Cy Tolliver on the HBO series Deadwood, and the corrupt senator Ethan Roark in the motion picture Sin City (2005), as well as its sequel, Sin City: A Dame to Kill For (2014). He is the voice of one of the characters in the 2005 video game Area 51 and of Gorilla Grodd, the hyper-intelligent telepathic supervillain in Justice League and Justice League Unlimited. He voiced the villain, Kane, in the 2008 video game Turok.

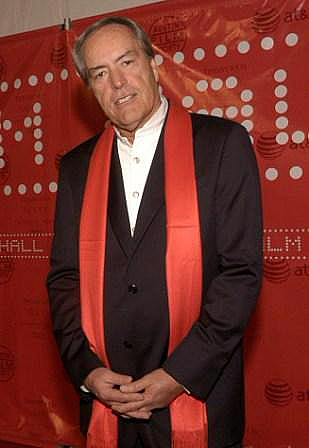
Boothe in 2005

He was a special guest star on 24, where he played Vice President Noah Daniels. He returned in the prequel to the seventh season, 24: Redemption. Just after taking the role as acting President, Boothe is seen exiting Air Force Two with F-15s in the background. Boothe played a downed F-15 pilot in Red Dawn. In March 2008, he narrated a television campaign ad for Senator John McCain's presidential campaign.

In 2012, Boothe appeared in Joss Whedon's The Avengers as Gideon Malick, a shadowy governmental superior to S.H.I.E.L.D. From 2015–16, he reprised the role in the ABC series Agents of S.H.I.E.L.D.

Boothe appeared in the 2012 miniseries Hatfields & McCoys as Judge Valentine "Wall" Hatfield. Boothe was also cast as Lamar Wyatt in the ABC musical drama series Nashville. Boothe also lent his voice to Hitman: Absolution, a 2012 video game developed by IO Interactive, voicing the character of Benjamin Travis.

== Personal life ==
Boothe married his college sweetheart Pam Cole in 1969 and they remained married until his death. They had two children.

Boothe was a member of the Friends of Abe.

Boothe was also a member of the Lambda-Phi Chapter of Lambda Chi Alpha at Southwest Texas State University.

== Death ==
Boothe died in Los Angeles, on the morning of May 14, 2017, from cardiopulmonary arrest caused by pancreatic cancer, aged 68.

== Theatre credits ==
Year	Title	Role	Venue	Notes
1974	Richard III	Ensemble member	Mitzi E. Newhouse Theater, Off-Broadway	
1978	Othello	Roderigo	Roundabout Stage I, Off-Broadway	
1979	Pvt. Wars	Natwick (understudy)	Century Theatre, Broadway	Broadway debut
1979	Lone Star	Roy	Century Theatre, Broadway	

== Filmography ==
=== Film ===
Year	Title	Role	Notes
1977	The Goodbye Girl	Richard III Cast	
1980	Cruising	Hankie Salesman	
1981	Southern Comfort	Corporal Charles Hardin	
1984	A Breed Apart	Mike Walker	
1984	Red Dawn	Lt. Col. Andrew "Andy" Tanner	
1985	The Emerald Forest	Bill Markham	
1987	Extreme Prejudice	Cash Bailey	
1988	Sapphire Man	Ryan	Short film
1990	Stalingrad	General Vasily Chuikov	
1992	Rapid Fire	Lieutenant Mace Ryan	
1993	Tombstone	Bill "Curly Bill" Brocius	
1994	Blue Sky	Colonel Vince Johnson	
1995	Mutant Species	Frost	
1995	Sudden Death	Joshua Foss	
1995	Nixon	Alexander Haig	
1997	Con Air	Officer at leaving ceremony (voice)	Uncredited
1997	U Turn	Sheriff Virgil Potter	
2000	Men of Honor	Captain Pullman	
2001	Frailty	FBI Agent Wesley Doyle	
2005	Sin City	Senator Ethan Roark	
2006	Superman: Brainiac Attacks	Lex Luthor (voice)	Direct-to-video
2007	The Final Season	Jim Van Scoyoc	
2008	Edison and Leo	George T. Edison (voice)	
2010	MacGruber	Colonel Jim Faith	
2012	The Avengers	Gideon Malick	Credited as "World Security Council"
2012	Guns, Girls and Gambling	The Rancher	
2013	Straight A's	Father	
2014	Sin City: A Dame to Kill For	Senator Ethan Roark	

=== Television ===
Year	Title	Role	Notes
1980	Skag	Whalen	6 episodes
1980	The Plutonium Incident	Dick Hawkins	Television film
1980	Guyana Tragedy: The Story of Jim Jones	Jim Jones	Television film
1980	A Cry For Love	Tony Bonnell	Television film
1983–1986	Philip Marlowe, Private Eye	Philip Marlowe	11 episodes
1987	Into the Homeland	Jackson Swallow	Television film
1990	Family of Spies	John A. Walker Jr.	2 episodes
1990	By Dawn's Early Light	Major Cassidy	Television film
1992	Eternal Enemies: Lions and Hyenas	Narrator (voice)	Documentary
1992	Wild Card	Preacher	Television film
1993	Marked for Murder	Mace "Sandman" Moutron	Television film
1994	Web of Deception	Dr. Philip Benesch	Television film
1996	Dalva	Sam	Television film
1997	True Women	Bartlett McClure	Television film
1998	The Spree	Detective Bram Hatcher	Television film
1999	Joan of Arc	Jacques d'Arc	3 episodes
1999	A Crime of Passion	Dr. Ben Pierce	Television film
2001	Attila	General Flavius Aetius	2 episodes
2002–2003	Justice League	Gorilla Grodd (voice)	4 episodes
2003	Second Nature	Kelton Reed	Television film
2004–2006	Deadwood	Cy Tolliver	34 episodes
2005–2006	Justice League Unlimited	Gorilla Grodd (voice)	5 episodes
2006	National Geographic: Lions v. Hyenas	The Narrator	Voice; documentary
2007	24	Noah Daniels	14 episodes
2008	24: Redemption	Noah Daniels	Television film
2009	Ben 10: Alien Force	Sunder (voice)	Episode: "Singlehanded"
2010	Ben 10: Ultimate Alien	Sunder (voice)	Episode: "The Transmogrification of Eunice"
2011	Scooby-Doo! Mystery Incorporated	Dead Justice (voice)	Episode: "Dead Justice"
2011	The Looney Tunes Show	Leslie Hunt (voice)	2 episodes
2012	Hatfields & McCoys	Judge Valentine "Wall" Hatfield	3 episodes
2012–2014	Nashville	Lamar Wyatt	26 episodes
2015–2016	Agents of S.H.I.E.L.D.	Gideon Malick	11 episodes
2015	Moonbeam City	Eo Jaxxon (voice)	Episode: "Glitzotrene: One Town's Seduction"

=== Video games ===
Year	Title	Voice role	Notes
2005	Area 51	Major Bridges	
2008	Turok	Roland Kane	
2010	Ben 10 Ultimate Alien: Cosmic Destruction	Sunder	
2012	Hitman: Absolution	Benjamin Travis	

== Awards and nominations ==
Year	Award	Category	Project	Result
1980	Primetime Emmy Award	Outstanding Lead Actor in a Miniseries or a Movie	Guyana Tragedy: The Story of Jim Jones	Won
1983	CableACE Award	Best Actor in a Dramatic Presentation	Philip Marlowe, Private Eye	Nominated
1987	CableACE Award	Best Actor in a Movie or Miniseries	Into the Homeland	Nominated
1995	Screen Actors Guild Award	Outstanding Cast in a Motion Picture	Nixon	Nominated
2007	Screen Actors Guild Award	Outstanding Ensemble in a Drama Series	Deadwood	Nominated
2012	Satellite Award	Best Supporting Actor – Series, Miniseries or Television Film	Nashville	Nominated
