= Roger Cross =

Jamaican actor (born 1969)

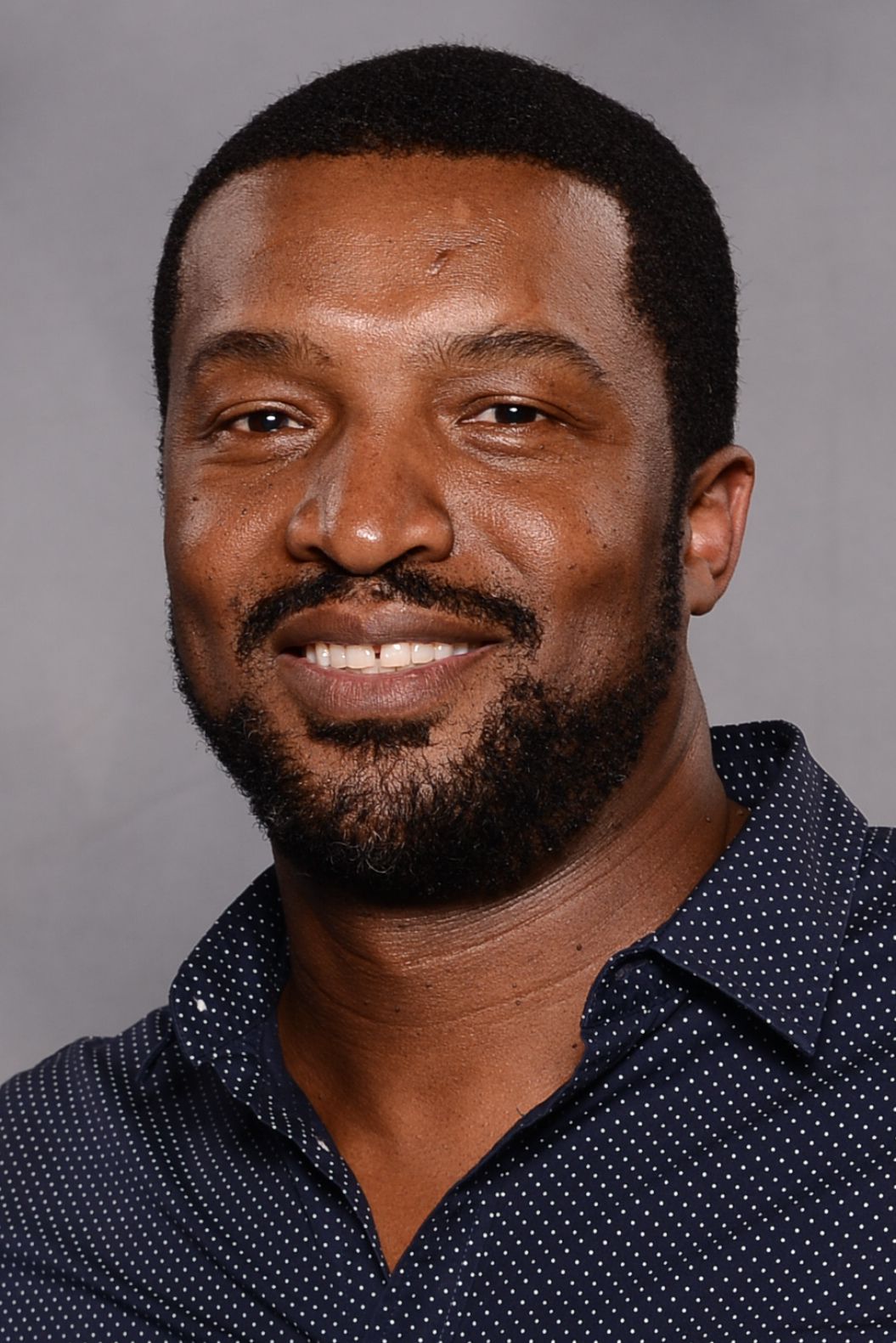
- Cross at the Florida Supercon in 2017
- Born: 19 October 1969 (age 56); Christiana, Jamaica
- Occupation: Actor
- Years active: 1989–present
- Children: 2

Roger Cross (born 19 October 1969) is a Jamaican actor. He is known for his work as Curtis Manning on 24 (2005–2007) and Detective Donovan McAvoy in Coroner (2019-2022). He earned a Canadian Screen Award nomination for Best Lead Actor in a drama series for Coroner and the show was nominated for Best Drama Series, 2020.

Cross also has other television roles that include First Wave (1998–2001), Arrow (2012), Continuum (2012–2015), Motive (2013–2016), Dark Matter (2015–2017), Murdoch Mysteries (2023-2024) Sight Unseen (2024-present). In film, He voiced John Stewart and Swamp Thing in the DC Animated Movie Universe films Justice League Dark (2017) and Justice League Dark: Apokolips War (2020). He also voiced Ulysses in the Lonesome Road expansion of the post-apocalyptic video game Fallout: New Vegas (2010).

== Early life ==
Cross was born in Christiana, Jamaica. When he was eleven, his family emigrated to Canada, settling in Vancouver, British Columbia. He graduated with a degree in Aviation and General Studies from Trinity Western University. Before his acting career, Cross was a professional pilot.

== Career ==
Cross began his career in the 1990s playing guest roles in such series as Street Justice, The X-Files, Sliders, Stargate SG-1, Highlander: The Series, Relic Hunter, The 4400, Higher Ground, Star Trek: Enterprise, and Chuck.

He auditioned for the role of Teal'c in Stargate SG-1, but lost out to Christopher Judge.

From 1998 to 2001, he starred as a lead character, Joshua Bridges, on the sci-fi series First Wave.

From 2005 to 2007, Cross achieved wider recognition for his role as CTU Agent Curtis Manning on the Fox television drama 24. In 2009, he appeared as DJ and drag queen Sunset Boulevard/Sonny Benson in the Showtime series The L Word.

In 2010, Cross did voice-over work as Ulysses in the Fallout: New Vegas add-ons Old World Blues and Lonesome Road.

Cross's other notable television roles include Staff Sergeant Boyd Bloom in Motive, Detective Lucas Hilton in Arrow, Reggie Fitzwilliam in The Strain, Travis Verta in Continuum, and Six in Dark Matter.

In addition to his work on television, Cross has appeared in such films as The Chronicles of Riddick, X2, Ballistic: Ecks vs. Sever, Beautiful Joe, Free Willy 3: The Rescue, World Trade Center, Re-Kill, and Mad Money.

== Personal life ==
Cross is in a long-term relationship with actress and yoga instructor Josephine Jacob. They have two sons, Kaniel Jacob-Cross and actor Gabriel Jacob-Cross, whose appearances include The Man in the High Castle (2015) and Snowpiercer (2020).

== Filmography ==
=== Film ===
Year	Title	Role	Notes
1993	Judgment Day: The John List Story	Dennis	
1993	Miracle on Interstate 880	Calvin	
1993	Woman on the Ledge	Fire Rescue Leader	
1993	Look Who's Talking Now	Pilot	
1994	In Spite of Love	Archie	
1994	The Man Who Wouldn't Die	McKinnon	
1994	Deadly Vows		
1994	The Disappearance of Vonnie	Officer #2	
1995	Dangerous Intentions	Assistant District Attorney Bob Melchor	
1995	Hideaway	Harry	
1995	She Stood Alone: The Tailhook Scandal	Marine Captain Talmadge	
1995	The Surrogate	Guard	
1995	Suspicious Agenda	Johnson	
1995	Gold Diggers: The Secret of Bear Mountain	Paramedic	
1997	Free Willy 3: The Rescue	1st Mate Stevens	
1997	Doomsday Rock	Gibson	
1998	Oklahoma City: A Survivor's Story		
1998	Voyage of Terror	Robert Fernandez	
1998	American Dragons	Detective Dion Edwards	
1999	Double Jeopardy	Hotel Manager	
1999	Aftershock: Earthquake in New York	Allen	
1999	NASCAR Racers: The Movie	Steve 'Flyer' Sharp	
2000	A Father's Choice	Detective Ross	
2000	Beautiful Joe	Roscoe Lee	
2000	Sole Survivor	Dr. Smithie	
2001	Trapped	Chief Edwards	
2001	The Void	Detective	
2002	Liberty Stands Still	Officer Miller	
2002	Ballistic: Ecks vs. Sever	DIA Agent Zane	
2002	Kid Bang	'Cee Note'	
2002	Deadly Little Secrets	Elliot Kincaid	
2002	Interceptor Force 2	Nathan McCallister	
2003	Final Destination 2	Isabella's Husband	
2003	X2	Oval Office Agent Cartwright	
2004	NTSB: The Crash of Flight 323	Co-Pilot	
2004	The Chronicles of Riddick	Commander Toal	
2005	King's Ransom	Byron	
2006	World Trade Center	Will's Doctor	
2008	Mad Money	Barry	
2008	The Day the Earth Stood Still	General Quinn	
2012	Noah's Ark: The New Beginning	Tarkus	
2012	Re-Kill	Sergeant	
2012	Tasmanian Devils	Simon	
2015	12 Rounds 3: Lockdown	Burke	
2017	Justice League Dark	John Stewart, Swamp Thing	Voice, direct-to-video
2017	War for the Planet of the Apes	Captain	
2020	Justice League Dark: Apokolips War	John Stewart, Swamp Thing	Voice, direct-to-video
2020	DC Showcase: Adam Strange	Foreman	Voice, direct-to-video
2023	A Snowy Day in Oakland	Brother Freeman	
2024	Wanted Man	Hernandez	

=== Television ===
Year	Title	Role	Notes
1989	21 Jump Street	Student	Episode: "Old Haunts in a New Age"; uncredited
1990	Wiseguy	Smash Cut	Episode: "Changing Houses"
1992	Neon Rider	Riley	Episode: "Color Lines"
1992	The Hat Squad	Sid	Episode: "Pilot"
1992–1993	Street Justice	Davey / Doug	2 episodes
1993	Madison	Officer Norm Michaels	Episode: "Tough Cries"
1993	The Commish	Officer Terry Cooper	4 episodes
1993	Born to Run	Roscoe	Television film
1994	Cobra	First Robber	Episode: "Lost in Cyberspace"
1994	M.A.N.T.I.S.	Dixon	Episode: "Tango Blues"
1994	Seasons of the Heart		Television film
1994	Beyond Suspicion	Curtis	Television film
1994	Don't Talk to Strangers	Curtis	Television film
1994	The X-Files	Officer Green	Episode: "E.B.E."
1995	Hawkeye	Angel / Anjou	Episode: "Fly with Me"
1995	Sliders	Wilkins	Episode: "Pilot"
1995	Strange Luck	Bryant	Episode: "Blind Man's Bluff"
1995	The X-Files	Private Kittel	Episode: "Fresh Bones"
1995–2001	The Outer Limits	Bartender / Jon / Kevin Flynn / Lt. Lockhart	4 episodes
1996	The Sentinel	Captain Mathis	Episode: "The Switchman"
1996	Viper	Carpenter	Episode: "Winner Take All"
1996	Highlander: The Series	Derek Worth	Episode: "Little Tin God"
1996	Captains Courageous	Hannibal	Television film
1996	The Limbic Region	Brownlee	Television film
1996	The X-Files	Swat Lieutenant	Episode: "Pusher"
1997	Millennium	Officer Shaw	Episode: "Wide Open"
1997	Cloned	Frank Zago	Television film
1997–1998	Stargate SG-1	Captain Conner / Lieutenant Connor	2 episodes
1998	Nick Fury: Agent of Shield	Shield Agent #1	Television film
1998	The Color of Courage	Thurgood Marshall	Television film
1998	The X-Files	Agent Rice	Episode: "Folie à Deux"
1998–2001	First Wave	Joshua / Cain / Joshua Bridges	Recurring role, 27 episodes
1999	War Planets	Voice—uncredited	Episode: "Girl's Night Out"
2000	Higher Ground	Roger Claypool	4 Episodes
2000	Hollywood Off-Ramp	Devon Monk	Episode: "Watch Your Step"
2000	2gether: The Series	Glenn Brummer	2 episodes
2001	Andromeda	Carter	Episode: "All Too Human"
2001	UC: Undercover	Captain Eddie Jackson	Episode: "Zero Option"
2002	Relic Hunter	Masters	Episode: "Hunting with the Enemy"
2002	Taken	Capt. Walker	Television miniseries, 3 episodes
2002–2003	Just Cause	CJ Leon	Main role, 19 episodes
2003	The Twilight Zone	The Leader	Episode: "Eye of the Beholder"
2003	Peacemakers	Isaac Evans	2 episodes
2003	Star Trek: Enterprise	Tret	Episode: "Extinction"
2004	JAG	Lt. Hugh Gaston	Episode: "Trojan Horse"
2004	The Days	Damien Morgan / Trey's Dad	2 episodes
2005	The 4400	Major Culp	Episode: "Lockdown"
2005–2007	24	Curtis Manning	Recurring role (seasons 4, 6); Main role (seasons 4–5); 45 episodes
2007	Bionic Woman	Bomani	Episode: "Trust Issues"
2008	NCIS	Lt. Cmdr. David Warfield	Episode: "Dog Tags"
2008–2009	The Guard	Jim McGregor	Recurring role, 10 episodes
2009	Playing for Keeps	Ty Rivers	Television film
2009	The L Word	Sunset Boulevard / Sonny Benson	6 episodes
2009	Flashpoint	Anton Burrows	Episode: "Just a Man"
2009	Fringe	Hybrid / Smith	2 episodes
2009	What Color Is Love?	Ty Rivers	Television film
2009	Polar Storm	President	Television film
2010	Chuck	Ring Agent	Episode: "Chuck Versus the American Hero"
2010	The Gates	Coach Ross	4 episodes
2011	Obscurus Lupa Presents	Shield Agent #1	Episode: "Nick Fury: Agent of S.H.I.E.L.D"
2011	Charlie's Angels	Detective Bradley Dumont	Episode: "Angels Never Forget"
2012	The Firm	Sergeant Leonard Debbs	Episode: "Chapter Nine"
2012	Eureka	Major William Shaw	3 episodes
2012	Arrow	Detective Hilton	9 episodes
2012	Abducted: The Carlina White Story	Carl	Television film
2012–2015	Continuum	Travis Verta	Main role, 36 episodes
2013–2016	Motive	Staff Sergeant Boyd Bloom / Superintendent Boyd Bloom	Main role
2014	Orphan Black	Carlton	Episode: "Governed as It Were by Chance"
2014–2015	The Strain	Mr. Fitzwilliam	Recurring role
2015	Bones	Kevin O'Donnell	2 episodes
2015	The Returned	Matt	Recurring role
2015–2017	Dark Matter	Six / Griffin Jones / Kal Varrick	Main role
2016	The 100	Commander Cole McAdams	Episode: "Thirteen"
2016	Blue Bloods	James Reed	Episode: "Personal Business"
2017	Dirk Gently's Holistic Detective Agency	Eddie, Farah Black's brother	2 episodes
2017	iZombie	Private Detective Coleman Baker	Episode: "Dirt Nap Time"
2018	Caught	Rodd Murin	2 episodes
2018	The Magicians	Admiral Lacker	2 episodes
2018	The X-Files	Officer Wentworth	Episode: "Familiar"
2019–2022	Coroner	Detective Donovan McAvoy	Main role
2020	The Rookie	Norman Jangus	Episode: "Casualties"
2020	Law and Order: Special Victims Unit	Reverend Delman Chase	Episode: "Garland's Baptism by Fire"
2021	MacGyver	Conor	Episode: "Rails + Pitons + Pulley + Pipe + Salt "
2022	All Saints Christmas	Matthew	Television film (Hallmark)
2022–2023	Murdoch Mysteries	Maurice Majors	6 episodes
2023	Dream Moms	Mark	Television film (Hallmark)
2023	Buying Back My Daughter	Curtis	Television film
2024	Fire Country	Parole Agent	Episode: "I Do"
2024–2025	Sight Unseen	Superintendent Bennett	12 episodes
2026	Anna Pigeon (TV series)	Pastor Nelson	Episode: "The Preacher"

=== Video games ===
Year	Title	Role
2010	Fallout: New Vegas	Ulysses, Biological Research Station
2011	Saints Row: The Third	Additional Voices
2012	Syndicate	Additional Voices
2012	Infex	Grissett
2012	Starhawk	Logan Graves / Outlaw
2013	BioShock Infinite	Additional Voices
