= Thomas Vincent Kelly =

American actor

- Other name: Thomas Kelly
- Occupation: Actor
- Years active: 1996–2009

Thomas Vincent Kelly is an American film and television actor, best known for his work on 24 as Dr. Marc Besson.

In 2002, Kelly played Raymond Pemberthy in The Wind Cries Mary, a play by Philip Kan Gotanda at the San Jose Repertory Theatre in San Jose, California.

== Filmography ==
- Early Edition (4 episodes, 1996–2000)
- The Ride (1997)
- Two Guys, a Girl and a Pizza Place (1 episode, 1998)
- Chicago Hope (1 episode, 1999)
- Bruised Orange (1999)
- Strong Medicine (1 episode, 2002)
- The Practice (1 episode, 2002)
- The Bernie Mac Show Police Officer (1 episode, 2002)
- The District (1 episode, 2003)
- Without a Trace (1 episode, 2003)
- Second Time Around (1 episode, 2004)
- ER (1 episode, 2004)
- Judging Amy (3 episodes, 2004)
- Mommy (2004)
- Leave No Trace (2004)
- JAG (2 episodes, 2004–2005)
- Brooklyn Lobster (2005)
- Blind Justice (1 episode, 2005)
- 24 (7 episodes, 2005–2006)
- The Closer (1 episode, 2007)
- One of Our Own (2007)
- Saving Grace (1 episode, 2009)
