= 24: Redemption =

2008 television film

- Film poster
- Genre: Action; Drama
- Based on: 24 by Joel Surnow; Robert Cochran
- Written by: Howard Gordon
- Directed by: Jon Cassar
- Starring: Kiefer Sutherland; Cherry Jones; Bob Gunton; Colm Feore; Powers Boothe; Robert Carlyle; Peter MacNicol; Gil Bellows; Hakeem Kae-Kazim; Siyabulela Ramba; Jon Voight
- Music by: Sean Callery
- Country of origin: United States
- Original language: English

Production
- Executive producers: Howard Gordon; Brian Grazer; Jon Cassar; Manny Coto; David Fury; Evan Katz; Kiefer Sutherland
- Production locations: Cape Town, South Africa
- Cinematography: Rodney Charters
- Editor: Scott Powell
- Running time: 89 minutes (broadcast); 102 minutes (extended)
- Production companies: Imagine Television; Teakwood Lane Productions; Real Time Productions; 20th Century Fox Television

Original release
- Network: Fox
- Release: November 23, 2008

24: Redemption is a 2008 American television film based on the series 24. Redemption takes place almost four years after the sixth season and two months before the seventh season in real time between 3:00 pm and 5:00 pm (Sangala Time Zone) on Inauguration Day in the United States. The main setting is Sangala, a fictional African country, where ex-Counter Terrorist Unit Agent Jack Bauer (Kiefer Sutherland) tries to find peace with himself, and works as a missionary with Carl Benton (Robert Carlyle), who built the Okavango school to aid war orphans. Bauer is served a subpoena to appear before the United States Senate regarding human rights violations, but refuses to go, and a shadow organization among the United States government aids General Benjamin Juma (Tony Todd) and his militia in a coup d'état. Juma's militia attempts to kidnap the children from the school and Jack has to decide whether or not to give himself up to American authorities in order to keep the children safe.

The film was written by executive producer Howard Gordon and was directed by Jon Cassar. The film's genesis originated with the 2007–2008 Writers Guild of America strike, which delayed the seventh season for a year thus leaving a gap in the series during 2008. It first aired on November 23, 2008, on Fox in the United States, and was released to DVD on November 25. Two versions of the film were released to DVD, the original broadcast version and an extended director's cut. The original airing was seen by just over 12 million Americans, and received widespread critical acclaim, and was praised for showing a more human side to Bauer. 24: Redemption was nominated for a Golden Globe as well as five Emmy Awards. The majority of Redemption was filmed on location outside Cape Town, South Africa since it was difficult to mimic authentic African scenery in America.

== Plot ==
44 months after the events of Day Six, a young boy in the African nation of Sangala is kidnapped at night, indoctrinated, and drafted along with other boys into a rebel militia led by General Benjamin Juma (Tony Todd) so they could take part in a coup d'état, which is being funded by an American shadow organization led by Jonas Hodges (Jon Voight).

While ex-Counter Terrorist Unit Agent Jack Bauer performs missionary work at the Okavango school in Sangala owned by his old friend and fellow former CTU agent Carl Benton (Robert Carlyle), United States Embassy official Frank Trammel (Gil Bellows) serves him a subpoena to appear before the Senate regarding torture charges. Bauer refuses to go, but upon hearing the embassy will cut funding to Benton's school if it continues to protect him, he decides to leave.

Meanwhile, several children playing soccer are ambushed by Juma's rebel soldiers and kidnapped for conscription, and when two boys run away, the soldiers open fire, killing one. Benton learns that the rebels are planning to attack his school and calls Bauer, who hides the children in an underground shelter, and kills several rebels before getting captured and tortured. Benton is able to ambush the remaining soldiers, and Bauer kills the leader, Youssou Dubaku (Zolile Nokwe). His brother, Iké (Hakeem Kae-Kazim), hears of his death and plots revenge, while Bauer and Benton leave with the children to get to the American embassy in the capital before the final helicopter evacuates the country.

In Washington, D.C., stockbroker Chris Whitley (Kris Lemche) is ordered by the conspirators who fund Juma's militia to erase all information that would incriminate them, but instead, he calls his friend Roger Taylor (Eric Lively), the son of President Elect Allison Taylor (Cherry Jones), for help. After Roger hears of the conspiracy, Whitley returns to his home to forward the files, only to be stopped by Hodges' men, Halcott and John Quinn (Sebastian Roché), who take the information, kill Whitley, and bury the body in concrete, staging his death as a suicide.

Benton, Bauer and the boys are spotted by Iké's helicopter. While they flee into the forest, Benton steps on a land mine, and with little time to disarm it, Benton urges Bauer to leave so he can buy time. When he is surrounded by Iké and his men, Benton takes his foot off the trigger and detonates the mine, killing himself and the rebels, though Iké survives. Bauer and the children continue to the capital, where he defeats another rebel ambush. At the gates of the embassy, Trammel denies the children's entry and political asylum due to their legal guardian, Benton, not being present, and blackmails Bauer into surrendering for the children's safety, and Bauer reluctantly accepts, thus sacrificing his freedom. While Taylor is inaugurated President, Bauer and the children evacuate, leaving chaotic Sangala behind.

== Cast and characters ==
=== Starring ===
- Kiefer Sutherland as Jack Bauer
- Cherry Jones as President-elect Allison Taylor
- Bob Gunton as Secretary of Defense Ethan Kanin
- Colm Feore as First Gentleman Henry Taylor

=== Special guest stars ===
- Powers Boothe as President Noah Daniels
- Robert Carlyle as Carl Benton

=== Special guest appearance by ===
- Jon Voight as Jonas Hodges

=== Guest starring ===
- Peter MacNicol as Tom Lennox
- Gil Bellows as Frank Trammell
- Hakeem Kae-Kazim as Colonel Ike Dubaku
- Siyabulela Ramba as Willie
- Isaach de Bankolé as Ule Matobo
- Kris Lemche as Chris Whitley
- Eric Lively as Roger Taylor
- James Joseph O'Neil as Halcott
- Carly Pope as Samantha Roth
- Sebastian Roché as John Quinn
- Tony Todd as General Benjamin Juma
- Mark Kiely as Agent Edward Vossler
- Mark Aiken as Nichols
- Sean Cameron Michael as Charles Solenz
- Siv Ngesi as Thomas
- Zolile Nokwe as Youssou Dubaku
- Mbongeni Nomkonwana as Desmond
- Alude Mahali as the desperate Sangalan mother
- Sonwabisile Jehoshaphat Ngoma as James
- Vincent Kiala as Seville

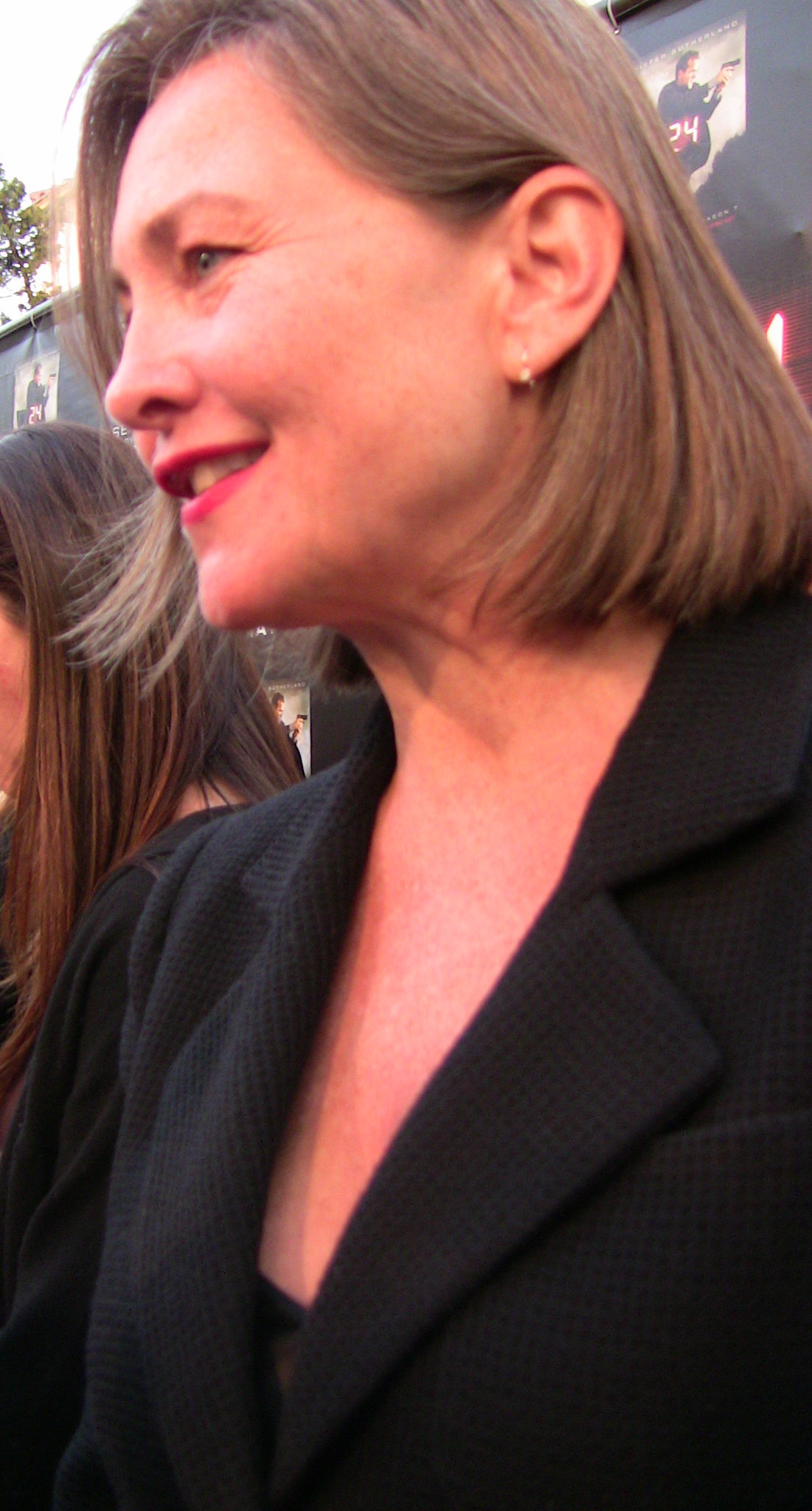
Cherry Jones plays Allison Taylor, America's first female president.

While the majority of the characters are introduced, there are still a small number of original cast who appeared in the past, namely Kiefer Sutherland, who plays Jack Bauer and Bob Gunton, who plays Ethan Kanin from the sixth season and appears as the outgoing Secretary of Defense and new White House Chief of Staff. Powers Boothe continues to play Noah Daniels, the outgoing president. Peter MacNicol reprises his role as Tom Lennox from the sixth season also.

In Sangala, Robert Carlyle plays Carl Benton, an old friend of Jack Bauer, who runs a school for rescued war orphans. Carlyle suggested that there is a very close friendship between Benton and Bauer, since he seems to let Benton come closer to him than others. Towards the end of the film, he sacrifices himself in order to buy time for Bauer and the children to escape. Gil Bellows plays Frank Tramell, a U.S. State Department official who is ordered to subpoena Bauer. Native South African actor Sean Michael plays Charles Solenz, a UN aid worker helping at Benton's school, and later abandons Benton and the children, claiming that the United Nations is "neutral" in the Sangala conflict.

Siyabulela Ramba plays Willie, one of the war orphans under the care of Benton, who befriends Bauer. Ramba felt an emotional connection with Sutherland during filming, and believes their friendship shows through onscreen. Isaach De Bankolé plays Ule Matobo, the prime minister of the nation, who is forced to evacuate the country during the coup. Among the antagonists in Sangala are General Benjamin Juma (Tony Todd), a former dictator and leader of the People's Freedom Army responsible for genocide in Sangala, and Iké Dubaku (Hakeem Kae-Kazim), one of Juma's lieutenants in the coup. Zolile Nokwe plays Youssou Dubaku, Iké's younger brother.

In Washington, Cherry Jones plays Allison Taylor, the first woman to be inaugurated President of the United States. Colm Feore plays Allison's husband and First Gentleman Henry Taylor. Eric Lively plays Roger Taylor, the First Son and son of Taylor, and appears alongside Carly Pope as his girlfriend, Samantha Roth, and Kris Lemche, who plays friend Chris Whitley. Among the antagonists in Washington are Jon Voight, who plays Jonas Hodges, a "very serious villain" involved in a Blackwater-type organization, as well as Mark Kiely, who plays Secret Service Agent Edward Vossler.

== Production ==
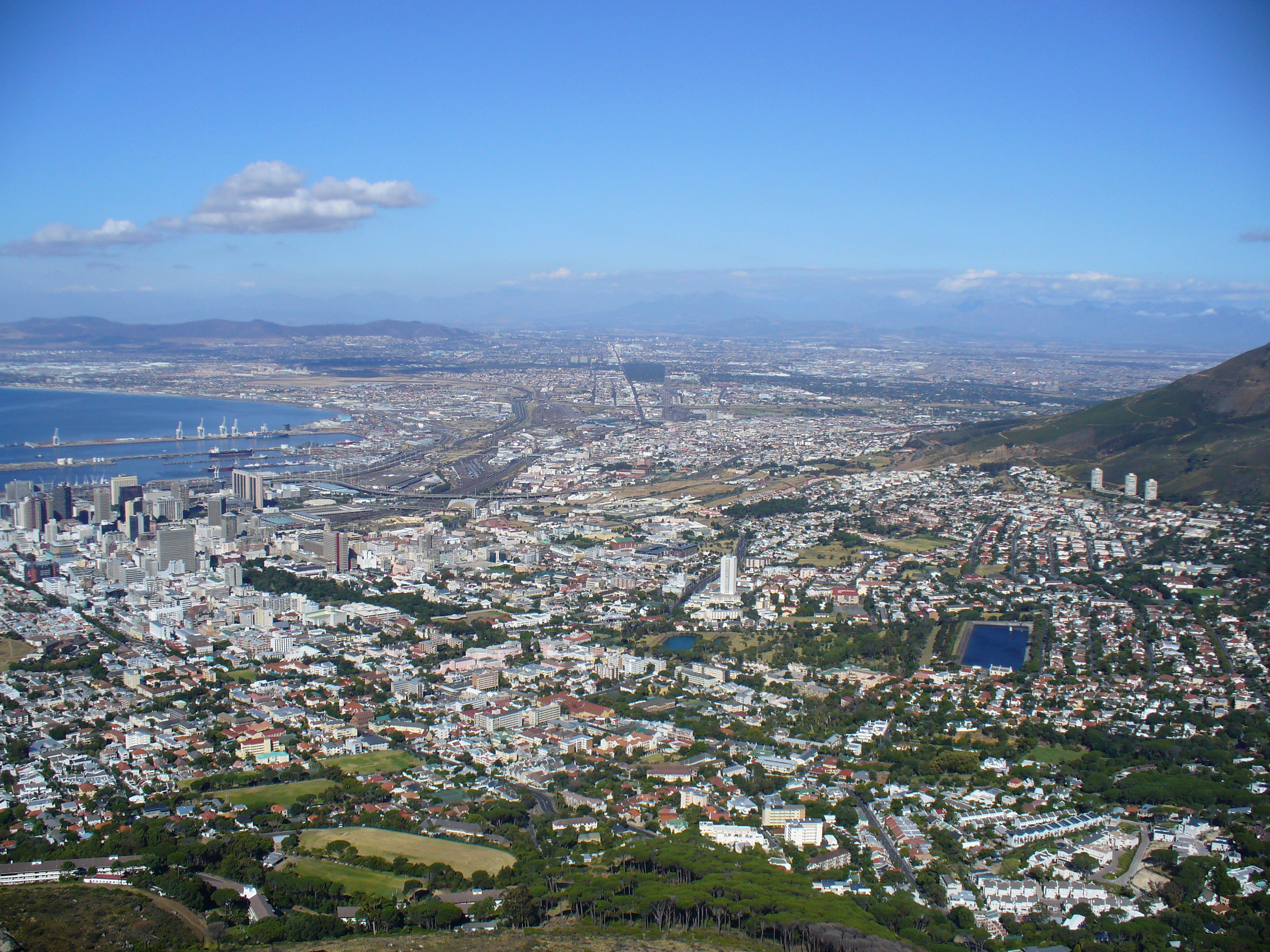
The majority of Redemption was filmed on location around Cape Town, South Africa.

The film was conceived as a result of the 2007–2008 Writers Guild of America strike, which delayed the seventh season for an entire year; the producers were exploring ways to get back on the air earlier. Ideas included airing webisodes or mobisodes. According to the President of Entertainment at Fox, "We were going to be off the air for a while and how do you bridge that gap. We thought about doing something online and after talking with [executive producer] Howard Gordon we decided to do it on air." The working title for the film was 24: Exile, until the change to 24: Redemption.

In an interview, Kiefer Sutherland revealed that Redemption was inspired by the Rwandan genocide and the U.S. Government's response to it. "The truth is, one of the things that was said in the prequel, which I think has been a massive problem with how the Western world has dealt with Africa, no one can justify going there, because they have no viable reason – meaning oil or money. Here [the president's] response is a human one. We can stop a genocide. I think that that's something that Bill Clinton apologized for not doing with Rwanda and we centered a show around that."

On April 30, producers began scouting locations in Africa in order to film the feature in the upcoming weeks. The original plan was to shoot three days worth of scenes in Africa and then have Simi Valley, California fill in for the location. After realizing it would be difficult to fake, it was decided to shoot the majority of the film on location in Cape Town, South Africa. Filming took place from June 4 to June 20 with the final scenes being shot in Los Angeles, California. By July 13, principal shooting of the film had been completed and post-production had begun.

== Reception ==
=== Release and viewership ===
Before release of Redemption, an exclusive six-minute clip was shown to fans at San Diego Comic-Con in 2008, which showed Bauer escorting a group of African children to the U.S. embassy and becomes involved in a gunfight on a crowded street. On September 21, 2008, another trailer was soon uploaded by Fox, focusing more on the conflict in Africa and how Jonas Hodges is involved in the conflict. It premiered on November 23, 2008, in the U.S. with the DVD released two days later. Fox also released an extended creator's cut of the feature. Other extras include an audio commentary, "Making of" and "Children of War" featurettes, a brief summary of the sixth season, an alternate Season 7 trailer featuring scenes from the first thirteen episodes, and the first sixteen minutes of the Season 7 premiere. In the United Kingdom, the film premiered on November 24 on Sky1, one day after first airing in America. It was later released in the UK on December 1, 2008, with both the original and extended versions on DVD. In Australia, Redemption aired on November 24, 2008, on the Seven Network. The DVD was later released on February 11, 2009.

Redemption was placed the second most viewed Fox release on the week it aired, behind House; Redemption drew a total of 12.121 million viewers, with a Nielsen rating of 7.0, 4.0/9 among adults aged 18–49. Redemption was the highest-rated scripted program of the night, and was 3rd overall for the 8:00 pm to 11:00 pm time slot, behind the American Music Awards and Sunday Night Football. It aired on Sky 1 in the UK, and received an average of 405,000 viewers, nearly triple the regular number of viewers for the series.

=== Critical reception ===
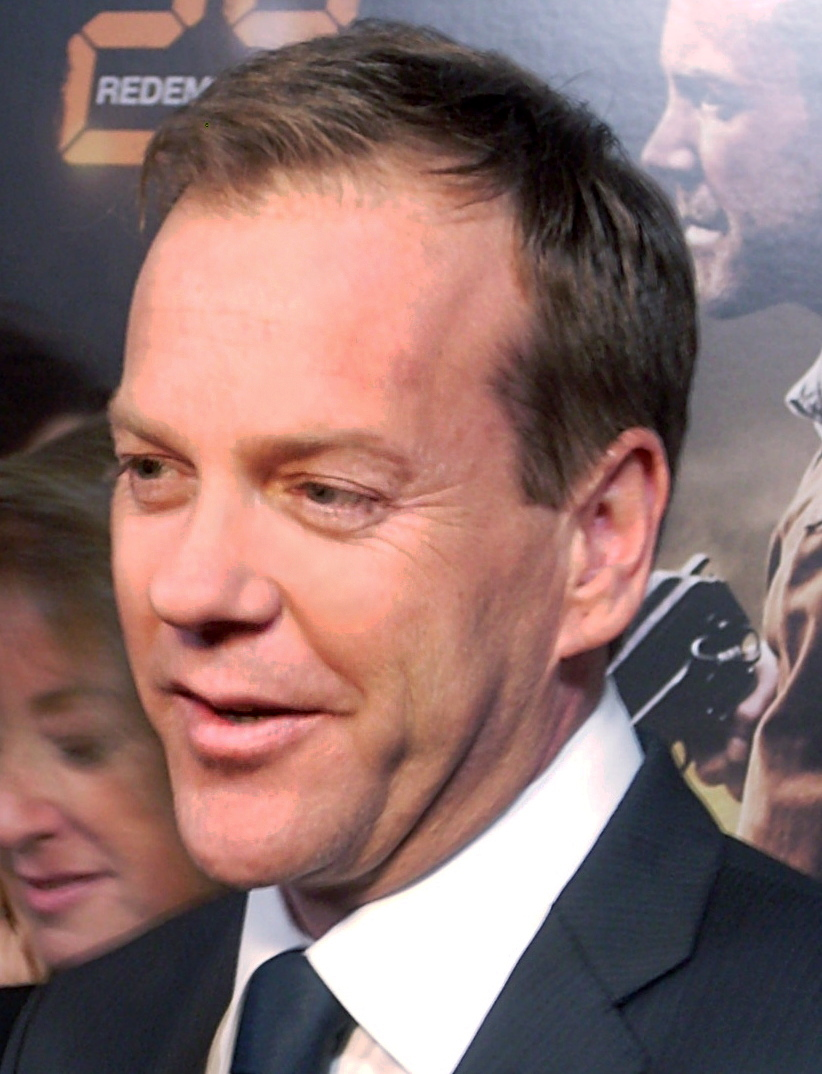
Kiefer Sutherland's performance was praised for showing more of a human side to Jack Bauer.

The film garnered widespread critical acclaim reviews from film critics. It holds an 80% approval rating on review aggregator website Rotten Tomatoes, based on 20 reviews. Alessandra Stanley of The New York Times gave the film a positive review, stating that Redemption is "a more sober, stripped-down version of 24, and that's refreshing," and that it was the first time a terrorist threat did not take place in Southern California, and the depiction of the conflict in Sangala is highly realistic and compelling. Stanley also said that a two-hour version of 24 proves that downsizing isn't always a bad thing. Mary McNamara of the Los Angeles Times praised the film, acknowledging the producers taking on board the criticism and moral issues regarding the use of torture, and stated that a group of innocent young children running for their lives "instantly ratchets up a story's emotional level."

Brian Zoromski of IGN rated it "good", 7.5 out of a possible 10. Zoromski stated that the purpose of Redemption was to allow the introduction of new characters for the seventh season. He further praised the action scenes involving Bauer on his own, stating it as a "sort of Die Hard in Africa," and called the change of setting from Los Angeles a "refreshing change of pace". However, Zormski criticized the film for containing "cludgy dialogue and bland scenes", but suggested that it makes up for it with the action scenes and emotional scenes involving Bauer, allowing Sutherland to show his acting range. Oscar Dah; of BuddyTV stated that the film should make up for the critics' poor outing of the sixth season, and has said that the film works wonderfully as the start of the seventh season, and praised Robert Carlyle's performance.

In addition, some reviews had mixed responses. Simon Brew of Den of Geek rated Redemption 3 out of 5 stars, praising it for showing a more human side of Bauer, the acting of Cherry Jones as Allison Taylor, and named Redemption as a solid bridge between season six and seven. However, Brew was critical that it "plays no havoc" with the world of 24, and that it is "lacking at times in urgency". Gerard Gilbert of The Independent stated that the introduction of Jonas Hodges was promising, and praised Jon Voight's acting, as well as stating that the character is the one most to look forward to in the seventh season. Matthew Gilbert of The Boston Globe gave the film a negative review, giving it a 2 out of 10, calling it "un-fun", and stating that Bauer's character has not changed at all from past seasons, and asking, "When does a rogue hero [Bauer] become a tired joke? Based on this un-fun movie, I would say yesterday."

=== Awards and nominations ===
In total, the film itself and its lead actor, Kiefer Sutherland, were nominated for several awards, but none of them resulted in a win. Sutherland was nominated for this performance as "Best Actor in a Miniseries or TV Film" at the 66th Golden Globe Awards, an award which was won by Paul Giamatti for his performance in John Adams. The TV film was also nominated with five Primetime Emmys, including four Creative Arts Primetime Emmys in its 61st ceremony. Sutherland was again nominated for Outstanding Lead Actor in a Miniseries or Movie for his role as Jack Bauer, but lost to Brendan Gleeson for his role as Winston Churchill in Into the Storm. Sean Callery was nominated for "Outstanding Music Composition for a Miniseries, Movie or a Special (Original Dramatic Score)", but lost to Into the Storm composer Howard Goodall. Scott Powell was nominated for "Outstanding Single-Camera Picture Editing for a Miniseries or a Movie", which was won by Lee Percy and Brian A. Kates for Taking Chance. William D. Dotson, Catherine M. Speakman, Jeffrey R. Whitcher, Pembrooke Andrews, Shawn Kennelly, Daryl Fontenault, Melissa Kennelly, Jeffrey Charboneau, Laura Macias and Vincent Nicastro were nominated for "Outstanding Sound Editing for a Miniseries, Movie or a Special", but lost to the crew of Generation Kill. Lastly, William Gocke, Colin McFarlane, Michael Olman and Kenneth Kobett were nominated for "Outstanding Sound Mixing for a Miniseries or a Movie", which was won again by the crew of Generation Kill. Sutherland was also nominated for the Screen Actors Guild Award for Outstanding Performance by a Male Actor in a Miniseries or Television Movie but once again lost to Paul Giamatti in John Adams. Redemption was also nominated for the Satellite Award for Best Television Film but lost to the BBC docudrama Filth: The Mary Whitehouse Story.
