= Curtis Manning (24) =

Character from the television series 24

- 24 character
- Roger Cross as Curtis Manning
- First appearance: Day 4 – Episode 1
- Last appearance: Day 6 – Episode 4
- Portrayed by: Roger Cross
- Days: 4, 5, 6

In-universe information
- Significant other: Marianne Taylor

Curtis Manning is a fictional character on the television series 24, portrayed by Roger Cross.

== Characterization ==
Before joining CTU, he was a member of the Boston Police Department's SWAT unit and had served in the United States Army Special Forces during Operation Desert Storm. Manning had a B.A. degree in Sociology from the University of Massachusetts Amherst.

== Appearances ==
=== 24: Season 4 ===
Manning was at this time the Chief of Staff of the Los Angeles Domestic Unit of the Counter Terrorist Unit under Special Agent in Charge Erin Driscoll. He used to be Head of Tactical and Assistant Director of Field Operations in that same unit. He came to Los Angeles from the Boston Domestic Unit, where he was a field agent and later that unit's Assistant Director of Field Operations.

Curtis was serving under Ronnie Lobell, who had replaced Jack Bauer as Director of Field Operations. When Lobell was killed in the line of duty, Jack is given the position again, and worked alongside Curtis for much of the day. He was briefly involved with CTU analyst Marianne Taylor, who was revealed to be a traitor. Throughout the day, he heads or takes part in many of the operations to capture Habib Marwan. During the final attempt to capture Marwan, Curtis was wounded in the arm by Marwan himself, but survived and stood alongside Jack to see the nuclear warhead be safely neutralized.

=== 24: Season 5 ===
Curtis, now the Director of Field Operations initially suspects that Jack may be involved in the murders of David Palmer and Michelle Dessler, but Jack regains his trust during a hostage crisis at Ontario National Airport. This coincides with the arrival of a Division bureaucrat Lynn McGill, who is placed in charge of CTU to coordinate their efforts to find 20 canisters of Sentox nerve gas stolen by Vladimir Bierko.

Curtis aids Jack when CTU attempts to bring in terrorist conspirator Jacob Rossler. When in the lobby Curtis takes a bullet in the chest, hitting his bulletproof vest. He also aids in the interrogation of Rossler.

When Lynn begins to exhibit signs of mental instability, Curtis relieves him of command by invoking Article 112 (which allows a ranking agent to remove a mentally unfit director), shortly after which he reinstates Bill Buchanan.

Curtis later prevents a nerve gas attack on Tyler Memorial Hospital, meaning that he was away from CTU during a nerve gas attack that killed 40% of its staff. Afterwards, he again becomes Jack's partner in the field for the remainder of the crisis.

Curtis helps Jack and other CTU agents infiltrate and destroy a Gas Refinery being used as a distribution center for the Sentox nerve gas. Curtis survives and shortly thereafter Jack appears out of the smoke with Bierko. Curtis is told to take Bierko back to CTU Medical. During this time, Homeland Security have taken over CTU and removed all major staff, excluding Chloe O'Brian. Curtis later leads a team that apprehends Christopher Henderson and kills his men.

Later, Curtis meets Jack at a Los Angeles Highway. He is able to avoid the U.S. Marines swarming the area and brings Jack to CTU safely. His last action in Day 5 comes in a sting operation to discover Bierko's last target, in which Curtis is non-critically injured.

=== 24: Season 6 ===
At the start of Day 6, Curtis and Bill Buchanan meet Jack Bauer at an airfield as he is released from Chinese custody. He accompanies Bill primarily as backup in case Jack is mentally unstable.

President Wayne Palmer authorizes a pardon of Assad in exchange for his continued cooperation. Soon after, Jack learns Curtis's history with Assad: shortly after Desert Storm, Assad's fighters ambushed Curtis's Special Forces team, killing five outright and capturing — and later publicly beheading — two. Curtis was badly wounded and could not go after his captured comrades. As Curtis is transporting Assad to CTU, Jack realizes that Assad's life is in danger. Jack rushes outside and sees Curtis holding a gun to Assad's head. Jack raises his weapon and tells Curtis to drop his own, but Curtis refuses. Jack begs Curtis to let Assad go, telling him that he gave his word that he would protect him (Assad), and Jack never breaks his word. Curtis tells Jack that he "can't let this animal live". Left with no other option, Jack shoots Curtis in the neck, killing him.
