= 24 season 7 =

24
- Season 7
- Promotional poster
- Starring: Kiefer Sutherland; Mary Lynn Rajskub; Cherry Jones; James Morrison; Annie Wersching; Colm Feore; Bob Gunton; Jeffrey Nordling; Rhys Coiro; Janeane Garofalo; Carlos Bernard
- No. of episodes: 24

Release
- Original network: Fox
- Original release: January 11 – May 18, 2009

Season chronology
- ← Previous; 24: Redemption; Season 6 Next → Season 8

The seventh season of the American drama television series 24, also known as Day 7, premiered in the United States on Fox on January 11, 2009, and concluded on May 18, 2009. The season was originally scheduled to premiere on January 13, 2008, but was delayed due to the 2007–08 Writers Guild of America strike. On November 23, 2008, Fox aired 24: Redemption, a two-hour TV movie set between seasons. Unlike all of the other seasons, this season's DVD set was released one day after the season finale. The season's storyline begins and ends at 8:00 a.m.

== Season overview ==
The seventh season takes place 46 months after season six and two months after 24: Redemption. Jack Bauer is on trial for alleged crimes he committed while working for CTU. Senator Blaine Mayer has disbanded CTU and strengthened the policies of President of the United States of America Allison Taylor's administration against torture. Bauer is brought into another counter-terrorist operation when FBI Special Agent Renee Walker interrupts the hearing to tell him about an imminent threat.

Day 7 can be divided into four main acts:

1. Warlord Iké Dubaku breaches a government firewall and attempts to cause massive damage, then tries to manipulate President Taylor by kidnapping her husband.
2. A unit of soldiers from Sangala invades the White House and takes President Taylor hostage.
3. Mercenaries from Starkwood acquire a prion weapon and threaten to deploy it on major American cities.
4. Tony Almeida betrays Jack and the FBI by stealing the last canister of the pathogen and attempting to use it against civilians.

=== Major subplots ===
- Senators are trying to send Jack to prison for life to make an example out of him.
- Members of the Taylor family are still mourning the loss of Roger Taylor.
- Tony Almeida's return to the series.
- While Jack is happy to have his old friend back, he feels that something is not quite right.
- Larry Moss tries to keep Renee Walker on the side of the law rather than adopting Jack's ruthless ways.
- Renee has difficulty accepting situations that put civilians at risk for the greater good.
- Allison Taylor begins to rethink the position she took against torture.
- A rivalry between Ethan Kanin and Olivia Taylor unfolds at the White House.
- Chloe clashes with an FBI analyst named Janis Gold.
- Jack becomes infected with a lethal pathogen and struggles to make peace before he dies.
- Kim Bauer has one last opportunity to reconnect with her father.

=== Summary ===
Day 7 begins in a U.S. Senate hearing during which Jack Bauer defends the necessity of his actions to Senator Blaine Mayer. Special Agent Renee Walker postpones the proceedings saying that the Federal Bureau of Investigation (FBI) urgently needs Jack's help. Even though Jack refuses to believe it at first, she reveals that Tony Almeida is still alive and that he is launching an attack against the government that betrayed him. When a contact agrees to talk to Bauer and Walker and is assassinated, the sniper leads them to Tony's location. Jack captures Tony and brings him to the FBI but learns that he is part of an undercover operation involving Bill Buchanan and Chloe O'Brian that aims to expose corruption in the government.

Jack breaks Tony out of the FBI's headquarters and meets with Bill and Chloe at a hideout that serves as a sort of underground CTU. There, he learns that Benjamin Juma and Iké Dubaku have infiltrated the government in order to stop the U.S. from invading Sangala. Dubaku plans to attack government infrastructure using the "CIP device" and have the Sangalan President, Ule Matobo, kidnapped. Jack and Tony team up with one of Dubaku's contacts, David Emerson, and proceed to kidnap Matobo. Along the way, Renee Walker discovers them. Instead of killing her, Jack manages to keep his cover safe by shooting her in the neck, burying her alive and sending her location to Chloe and Bill. After Tony reluctantly kills Emerson, the group hand Matobo over to Dubaku's henchmen and begin an assault once they learn Dubaku's location. During the assault, they rescue Matobo and destroy the CIP device but Dubaku escapes.

Dubaku attempts to manipulate President Taylor by kidnapping Henry Taylor but Jack and Renee find the First Gentleman by interrogating a U.S. Secret Service agent. During the rescue, Henry Taylor suffers a gunshot wound from which he eventually recovers. With Dubaku on the run, Walker and Bauer are able to find him with the help of his girlfriend Marika. Although Dubaku's vehicle crashes in a car chase killing Marika, Dubaku survives with enough strength to provide Bauer with a list of names of his co-conspirators. Buchanan uses this list to begin making arrests. When the arrests are in progress, Tony informs Jack that General Juma is planning an attack and tells him that Senator Mayer's chief of staff Ryan Burnett knows the details. Jack begins to torture Burnett but he is apprehended before he can finish. Juma is able to attack his target—which turns out to be the White House—and Jack, Bill and Taylor find themselves held hostage.

Although Jack plans to save the hostages by sacrificing himself, Bill Buchanan does this instead, saying that a dangerous conspiracy still remains and that Jack is the only person he trusts to unravel it. When Jack tries to get further information out of Burnett, a mercenary arrives who kills Burnett and frames Bauer for the murder. When Jack escapes, he learns that the mercenary, John Quinn, works for Starkwood—a defense contractor with an interest in developing bioweapons—led by a man named Jonas Hodges. After he is framed for the murder of U.S. Senator Mayer, Jack kills Quinn and learns the location of a bioweapon that just arrived from Sangala. He and Tony initiate a raid, which results in Tony's capture by Starkwood. Jack drives the weapon away from the port but is delayed when he stops to seal one of the leaking canisters. This not only exposes him to the pathogen but allows Starkwood to recapture it as well.

Jack learns that he is dying and tries to see the operation through to the end before he dies. He has an emotional meeting with his daughter Kim and tells Kim that he does not want her to try to save him with stem cells. FBI and military forces land in the Starkwood base and meet Tony Almeida but Starkwood forces outnumber them and force them to retreat. Tony sneaks away from the group and is able to remain at the base unseen. Co-ordinating with Jack, he destroys the canisters of the prion which allows the government to move in and arrest Hodges. To everyone's surprise, a Starkwood operative, Robert Galvez is seen with a surviving canister of the pathogen and a helicopter with Tony Almeida and Larry Moss on board gives chase. Tony betrays the FBI by killing Moss and helping Galvez escape the perimeter before escaping himself. Furious, Jack learns from Hodges that Tony has been in league with private military contractors all along and that he is working to have Islamic-Americans carry out a biological attack.

Tony and a co-conspirator named Cara Bowden force an innocent Muslim man to frame himself for a subway attack, by making a video and riding the subway, without knowing the details of what he's being framed for. Bowden delivers the canister of pathogenic agent, with a fifteen-minute timer on it, to the subway car the young man is riding, then exits. Jack intercepts the canister just in time but is forced to turn on the FBI and free Tony when he learns that Bowden's operatives are following Kim. Tony convinces Cara and the leader of their group named Alan Wilson to harvest the pathogen from Jack's body. Tony tells Jack in private that his plan is really to bring Alan Wilson into the open so that he can be murdered; Alan Wilson was the man behind Charles Logan, who had both David Palmer and Michelle Dessler murdered. FBI agents arrive at the compound having learned of Jack's location from a rescued Kim Bauer. A firefight ensues which is ended by Jack and Renee who stop Almeida from killing Wilson. Renee decides to torture Wilson when she learns that he has covered all his tracks. After Jack's doctor induces a coma, Kim arrives and begs her to begin the stem cell procedure that Jack told her not to undergo. The season ends with Kim at her father's side, left with a thread of hope that he may survive.

== Characters ==
Season 7 main cast: (from left to right) Rhys Coiro, Janeane Garofalo, Jeffrey Nordling, Annie Wersching, Carlos Bernard, Kiefer Sutherland, James Morrison, Mary Lynn Rajskub, Colm Feore, Cherry Jones, and Bob Gunton

=== Starring ===
- Kiefer Sutherland as Jack Bauer (24 episodes)
- Mary Lynn Rajskub as Chloe O'Brian (13 episodes)
- Cherry Jones as President Allison Taylor (23 episodes)
- James Morrison as Bill Buchanan (10 episodes)
- Annie Wersching as Renee Walker (24 episodes)
- Colm Feore as First Gentleman Henry Taylor (12 episodes)
- Bob Gunton as Ethan Kanin (18 episodes)
- Jeffrey Nordling as Larry Moss (19 episodes)
- Rhys Coiro as Sean Hillinger (10 episodes)
- Janeane Garofalo as Janis Gold (21 episodes)
- Carlos Bernard as Tony Almeida (20 episodes)

=== Special guest stars ===
- Kurtwood Smith as Senator Blaine Mayer (6 episodes)
- Elisha Cuthbert as Kim Bauer (5 episodes)

=== Special guest appearance by ===
- Jon Voight as Jonas Hodges (10 episodes)

=== Guest starring ===
- Frank John Hughes as Secretary of Homeland Security Tim Woods (16 episodes)
- Sprague Grayden as First Daughter Olivia Taylor (14 episodes)
- Glenn Morshower as Aaron Pierce (10 episodes)
- Hakeem Kae-Kazim as Colonel Iké Dubaku (9 episodes)
- Rory Cochrane as Greg Seaton (7 episodes)
- Warren Kole as Brian Gedge (7 episodes)
- Ryan Cutrona as Admiral John Smith (6 episodes)
- Isaach de Bankolé as Ule Matobo (6 episodes)
- Amy Price-Francis as Cara Bowden (6 episodes)
- Ever Carradine as Erika (5 episodes)
- Christina Chang as Dr. Sunny Macer (5 episodes)
- Will Patton as Alan Wilson (5 episodes)
- Carly Pope as Samantha Roth (5 episodes)
- Peter Wingfield as David Emerson (5 episodes)
- Gabriel Casseus as Robert Galvez (4 episodes)
- Mark Kiely as Edward Vossler (4 episodes)
- Enuka Okuma as Marika Donoso (4 episodes)
- Eyal Podell as Ryan Burnett (4 episodes)
- Omid Abtahi as Jibraan Al-Zarian (3 episodes)
- John Billingsley as Michael Latham (3 episodes)
- Dameon Clarke as Alan Tanner (3 episodes)
- Rafi Gavron as Hamid Al-Zarian (3 episodes)
- Ravi Kapoor as Muhtadi Gohar (3 episodes)
- Carlo Rota as Morris O'Brian (3 episodes)
- Tony Todd as General Benjamin Juma (3 episodes)
- Chris Mulkey as Doug Knowles (2 episodes)
- Mary Page Keller as Sarah (2 episodes)
- Don McManus as Bob Peluso (2 episodes)
- Sebastian Roché as John Quinn (2 episodes)
- Paul Wesley as Stephen (2 episodes)
- Cameron Daddo as Vice President Mitchell Hayworth (2 episodes)

== Episodes ==
No. overall	No. in season	Title	Directed by	Written by	Original release date	Prod. code	US viewers (millions)
145	1	"Day 7: 8:00 a.m. – 9:00 a.m."	Jon Cassar	Howard Gordon & Joel Surnow & Michael Loceff	January 11, 2009	7AFF01	12.61
Two months after the events of Redemption, in a Senate Hearing presided by Senator Mayer, Jack Bauer is answering for one of his previous torture cases, which Bauer believes to be justifiable, while CTU is revealed to be disbanded for illegal interrogation methods. FBI agent Renee Walker interrupts the Hearing and takes Bauer to the Bureau, where she tells him that a technician named Michael Latham was just kidnapped for the purpose of creating an override device called a CIP which can be used for terrorist purposes, in this case intercepting air traffic control. She then shows Bauer a camera image of one of the men involved with the crime, former CTU agent Tony Almeida, leaving Bauer shocked, as he believed Almeida was dead, and is in denial that he's involved with a terrorist activity. FBI Director Larry Moss tasks Walker to accompany Bauer as he helps them to find a man associated with Tony, but when the duo arrives at his house, he is killed by a sniper, and at that moment, Bauer gets a call from Almeida, who warns him not to interfere. Meanwhile, President Allison Taylor is preparing to attack Sangala to overthrow General Benjamin Juma and stop his militia, while her husband Henry is investigating the death of his son, Roger, who is believed to have committed suicide. Latham manages to complete the CIP, which Almeida plans to use to send a warning to the airlines instead of causing two planes to crash.
146	2	"Day 7: 9:00 a.m. – 10:00 a.m."	Jon Cassar	Teleplay by : Joel Surnow & Michael Loceff; Story by : Howard Gordon & Evan Katz	January 11, 2009	7AFF02	12.61
Bauer tells Walker that because the sniper got to their location at the same time they did, he believes there is a mole inside the FBI, but they must work without reporting for now. Alan Tanner, the sniper, poses as an agent and leaves the perimeter, but is spotted by Bauer, who convinces Walker that they follow Tanner to find Almeida and the CIP. Meanwhile, Almeida intentionally causes a near crash of two planes using the CIP, sending a warning to the government, and then gives the CIP to his boss man, who delivers it to Juma's henchman, Iké Dubaku. As Moss gets suspicious of Bauer and Walker because the latter does not report her status properly, the duo follows Tanner to the location associated with Almeida and the CIP, and Tanner is critically wounded. They storm in, and in the ensuing chase and fight, they manage to capture Almeida, while Moss and other agents arrive by helicopter, having tracked the location. In the meantime, Allison convinces de jure Sangalan Prime Minister Ule Matobo to subject Juma to due process instead of immediate execution after the U.S. military assault, while Henry meets Samantha Roth, Roger's former girlfriend, who claims that he did commit suicide, though Henry angrily refuses to believe her claim and vows to find the truth.
147	3	"Day 7: 10:00 a.m. – 11:00 a.m."	Brad Turner	Manny Coto & Brannon Braga	January 12, 2009	7AFF03	12.31
Moss puts Almeida under arrest, and upon arriving at the Bureau, Bauer and Walker reveal to Moss their belief about the mole. Bauer convinces him to let him talk to Almeida first, and Moss warns him not to use extreme methods like he did in the past. Almeida makes Bauer angry during the conversation, but as Bauer attacks him, Almeida gives him a secret message, and when Bauer is taken outside, he calls a number interpreted by that message, and former CTU director Bill Buchanan answers. He reveals that Almeida is working with him and former agent Chloe O'Brian in a covert mission, saying that many people within Taylor's government are aiding Dubaku's regime. Meanwhile, Dubaku sends a message to the White House, demanding that Allison abort the attack on Sangala, and threatening to use the CIP for mass murder, but she refuses to surrender to the demand. Chief of Staff Ethan Kanin reveals to Henry evidence that Roger committed suicide before he was about to be investigated by the SEC for insider trading, and then, Henry gets a call from Roth, who reveals that Roger was actually murdered, and they arrange a meeting. FBI agent Janis Gold is told by Walker to uncover a possible leak in the agency, and Janis finds that someone circumvented the Level 4 lockdown to hack into the FAA database. She sees evidence that co-worker Sean Hillinger is behind the attempted breach, but he claims that he was merely checking up on his wife, who is onboard one of the flights, to see if she had been grounded. Acting on orders from Buchanan, Bauer manages to break Almeida out, and with O'Brian's help, they escape the Bureau and get into Buchanan's car to escape.
148	4	"Day 7: 11:00 a.m. – 12:00 p.m."	Brad Turner	David Fury & Alex Gansa	January 12, 2009	7AFF04	12.31
Bauer is taken to the building that Buchanan, Almeida, and O'Brian are working at, and there, Almeida and Buchanan reveal to Bauer that when Almeida's body was moved outside of CTU at Day 5, he was revived by a man named David Emerson, an associate of Bauer's former CTU boss Christopher Henderson. Bauer and Almeida head to meet Emerson, where Almeida reveals that he was angry with the government and committed a series of crimes during the past years, but when he found out about the CIP and its capabilities of harming innocent people, he contacted Buchanan to help recover it and put a stop to Emerson's goal. Bauer and Almeida are both able to convince Emerson to include Bauer in his plan, which involves capturing Matobo and delivering him to Dubaku, allowing Bauer and Almeida access to Dubaku. In the meantime, Roth reveals to Henry that Roger was investigating a corruption in Allison's government which could be the reason he was killed, and gives him a storage device containing clues. Walker and Janis arrive at the hospital where Tanner is kept, where Walker convinces Gold to cover for her so that she can torture Tanner; he reveals that Emerson's targets are Matobo and his wife, Alama. The FBI warns Matobo's security detail in time, and he and his wife manage to get into their bunker, where Bauer finds it apparently impenetrable.
149	5	"Day 7: 12:00 p.m. – 1:00 p.m."	Jon Cassar	Howard Gordon & Evan Katz	January 19, 2009	7AFF05	12.10
Emerson tries to force Matobo to open the door by threatening to kill the chief guard, but to no avail, though Bauer finds the ventilation pathway of the bunker and manages to prepare a toxic gas, which he pumps into the bunker, forcing Alama to open the door, and she and Matobo are captured by Bauer and Emerson. While an agent from DOJ arrives at the FBI to investigate Walker's torture of Tanner, Walker arrives alone at Matobo's residence just as Bauer and Emerson are leaving, and she is captured as well, as Walker becomes angry, believing that Moss's initial thoughts were correct and that Bauer cannot be trusted. Meanwhile, Brian Gedge, Henry's bodyguard, states his intention to help Henry find the ones responsible for his son's death, and takes Henry to Roth's house, but there, Gedge reveals himself to be the one who killed Roger, and Henry collapses as a result of being poisoned with a paralytic agent. Vossler, another Secret Service agent, approaches Roth and claims that Henry has ordered him to put her under protective custody, offering her to take her necessary belongings from her house first. In the van, Emerson tasks Bauer to kill Walker to prove his loyalty, and as Bauer prepares to do so, he secretly tells Walker that he can get her out of this alive, before shooting her, making her look dead, and he and Almeida start burying her alive.
150	6	"Day 7: 1:00 p.m. – 2:00 p.m."	Jon Cassar	Manny Coto & Brannon Braga	January 26, 2009	7AFF06	12.22
As O'Brian and Buchanan arrive and revive Walker, while explaining the mission to her, Emerson's team heads for a warehouse, during which Emerson reveals that Henderson never intended to kill Almeida because he was too valuable. Upon arrival at the warehouse, Emerson and his men turn on Bauer and Almeida, but in the ensuing confrontation, Bauer and Almeida manage to shoot them down, and Almeida calls Emerson out for fully intending to kill innocent people, causing Emerson to berate Almeida as he ultimately dies. O'Brian, Buchanan and Walker arrive and they tell the Matobos of their mission, convincing them to cooperate until the CIP is secured, while Walker expresses her disbelief at the level of corruption in the government and the FBI. After planting a tracker on Ule Matobo, Dubaku's operatives arrive and attempt to kill Almeida, but Bauer warns them with his sniper rifle, forcing Dubaku's men to take the Matobos without retaliating. Meanwhile, Dubaku causes two planes to crash and threatens another attack in an hour, before picking another high casualty target in Ohio. The Secretary of State demands that Allison abort the attack on Sangala, which she refuses to do and instead demands his resignation, to which he complies, though Kanin believes Henry could dissuade her. In the meantime, Roth arrives at her house, where Gedge fatally stabs her and puts the knife in Henry's hand, intending to frame Henry for Roth's death and stage his own death as a suicide, but Henry manages to recover in time to stop Gedge's attempt, and ultimately ends up killing Gedge himself after a brief struggle.
151	7	"Day 7: 2:00 p.m. – 3:00 p.m."	Milan Cheylov	Teleplay by : Manny Coto & Brannon Braga; Story by : Michael Loceff	February 2, 2009	7AFF07	11.34
The Matobos are brought to Dubaku, who plans to send them back to Sangala and force Ule to reveal intel using his wife as leverage. He then activates his attack on his next target, a chemical plant, and unleashes a deadly gas from the plant, while the lead technician attempts to contain the gas with Gold's help. However, Buchanan's team has already followed Dubaku's men to his location, forcing Dubaku to halt the attack on the plant and averting any huge catastrophes, although the lead technician dies in the process of managing to contain the breach. As O'Brian provides support, the others infiltrate the compound and secure the CIP in the ensuing shootout, but Dubaku manages to escape with the help of Latham, who is killed by a bomb planted on him. Having been rescued, Ule calls Allison and arranges a meeting at the White House, while Almeida chooses to leave to pursue a lead from someone in Emerson's crew, but promises to return and face the consequences of his actions once Dubaku is captured. Meanwhile, a fleeing Dubaku hides in his safe house, and is revealed to be involved with an American waitress named Marika Donoso, while Henry tries to leave the house, but Vossler enters and captures him, and is ordered by Dubaku to deliver Henry to him alive.
152	8	"Day 7: 3:00 p.m. – 4:00 p.m."	Milan Cheylov	Teleplay by : Robert Cochran & Evan Katz; Story by : David Fury	February 9, 2009	7AFF08	10.61
Matobo brings Buchanan, Bauer and Walker to the White House with him, where they inform Allison of the corruption in the government and offer to help uncover the accomplices. Dubaku calls Allison and reveals that Henry has been captured by his associates, demanding the invasion on Sangala be aborted, but even with her husband in danger, she still decides not to give in to his demands, and approves Bauer's request to help find Henry. Bauer and Walker find out about Vossler's involvement in the situation, and Bauer goes after him while Walker goes to his house, where she holds Vossler's wife and child hostage. Bauer overpowers Vossler in a fight and calls Walker, who threatens to kill Vossler's child, forcing him to reveal Henry's location, and he is killed by Bauer when he attempts to finish him off. Afterwards, Bauer and Walker arrive at the location and kill Dubaku's men, but find Henry critically shot. Meanwhile, after Dubaku demands Ule be delivered to him in exchange for Henry, a double is sent to the location as a diversion, but he ends up being killed by Dubaku's men. Marika's sister, Rosa, feels uneasy about Dubaku, who has introduced himself as Samuel, ultimately calling Dubaku to reveal her knowledge of his illegal immigration and fake name, and demands he leave Marika alone.
153	9	"Day 7: 4:00 p.m. – 5:00 p.m."	Milan Cheylov	David Fury	February 16, 2009	7AFF09	11.22
As Henry is taken to a hospital, Buchanan takes command of Allison's security detail and takes her to the hospital as a protection measure. Dubaku, who is revealed to genuinely care for Marika, convinces her to pack up so that they can leave the country together, and then meets with an associate, Ryan Burnett, who also happens to be Mayer's chief of staff, and reveals to have a list of all his associates, including Burnett, threatening to disclose it if anything happens to him, essentially blackmailing Burnett into complying with his demands. After lecturing Walker for her earlier interrogation of Vossler's family, Larry Moss becomes further convinced that there's a mole in the FBI, and O'Brian arrives at the FBI to assist Moss in the covert operation. Gold gets suspicious of Moss' activities and forces Hillinger to give her access so that she can find the truth, and Hillinger looks over Chloe's discovered information. As Marika attempts to leave home, Bauer finds Marika's location and he and Walker storm in, revealing Dubaku's identity to the shocked sisters, and Marika agrees to help them capture Dubaku. As Bauer and Walker are following Dubaku and Marika, they are stopped by the police, as they were alerted by Hillinger, who is revealed to be a mole, while Burnett informs Dubaku about Marika's plan. Meanwhile, Aaron Pierce arrives and informs Allison's daughter Olivia about Henry's condition, and he starts transporting her to the White House.
154	10	"Day 7: 5:00 p.m. – 6:00 p.m."	Milan Cheylov	Manny Coto & Brannon Braga	February 23, 2009	7AFF10	11.68
Dubaku confronts Marika over working with the FBI, but attempts to assure her that he really does care about her, and Marika reluctantly agrees to get in the car to leave the country with Dubaku. The FBI manages to track them in their car, and as Bauer and Walker intercept and chase them, Marika puts her hands over the driver's face, causing a huge car crash that kills Marika and critically wounds Dubaku. Bauer extracts a chip planted in Dubaku's body, deducing it contains the list of his associates, and sends it to O'Brian. Hillinger kills his girlfriend, a fellow agent, and tells Moss that she was the mole, temporarily diverting attention from himself, but as he tries to escape the Bureau, he is ultimately caught and arrested, as O'Brian already opened the list. After Walker is confronted by Rosa for Marika's death, she in turn viciously confronts Bauer for what he forced her to do during the day, questioning his humanity and his priorities. Almeida returns and informs Bauer that there will be another attack on a high-value target, adding that Burnett has the information they need to try to stop the attack, while Burnett receives a message from an associate that the attack operation is ready to be executed. Meanwhile, Buchanan requests that Allison consider getting Jack's Senate hearings cancelled, and Allison requests that Mayer and Burnett come to the White House to discuss the situation further, while refusing to allow Olivia to leave the White House for the hospital.
155	11	"Day 7: 6:00 p.m. – 7:00 p.m."	Brad Turner	Alex Gansa	March 2, 2009	7AFF11	11.14
Bauer secretly convinces O'Brian to delete Burnett's name from the list so that he can question him personally, while Mayer and Burnett arrive at the White House, where Allison tries to convince Mayer to cancel Bauer's hearings in gratitude of his actions during the day, threatening to negate all of Mayer's efforts by pardoning Bauer. As the FBI finds out about O'Brian's actions and arrests her, Bauer breaks into the White House and starts torturing Burnett, but White House agents storm in and arrest him. Meanwhile, Benjamin Juma is revealed to be in Washington, where he sends an operative to kill Iké Dubaku in the hospital, but Walker catches the operative in the act, and follows him to the boat yard where Juma and his men are staging. As Walker calls Moss for reinforcements, the Sangalans board a boat, with Walker sneaking on board, and lay out their plans for attacking the White House. Walker narrowly escapes, with Laurent, Dubaku's son, in pursuit, while Juma and his commando unit begin an underwater infiltration.
156	12	"Day 7: 7:00 p.m. – 8:00 p.m."	Brad Turner	Teleplay by : Evan Katz; Story by : Manny Coto & Brannon Braga	March 2, 2009	7AFF12	11.14
Walker continues running, chased by Laurent Dubaku, who himself is being chased by Larry Moss and his FBI contingent, who arrived just too late; they kill Laurent and Moss alerts the White House. Buchanan, about to turn Jack over for arrest, instead frees him and begins to stage the defense, but at this time, Juma and his men have already made it into the White House and start engaging Secret Service in a shootout. Buchanan removes President Taylor's tracker as a diversion, and Jack manages to get her into a saferoom. Juma lies to the Secret Service that he has taken the President captive, forcing them to exit the White House, while Vice President Hayworth refuses to authorize a rescue attempt until he is sure that Taylor is safe. Juma's men take everyone hostage, including Senator Mayer, and upon finding the bunker impenetrable, Juma calls his associate, Jonas Hodges, and demands his help, threatening to cancel a specific shipment that is due to arrive in port soon unless he gets help; Buchanan takes special note of the call. Hodges, improvising, correctly deduces that Olivia Taylor and Aaron Pierce are not among the captives, suggesting she may be on-site and in hiding, and that capturing her is the key to forcing the President's surrender. Pierce and Olivia, who are in the process of attempting to broadcast a signal to the agents outside, are found by Juma's men and detained, and Allison Taylor, unable to stand by as her only child is mutilated, surrenders to General Juma.
157	13	"Day 7: 8:00 p.m. – 9:00 p.m."	Brad Turner	Manny Coto & Brannon Braga	March 9, 2009	7AFF13	11.37
As Juma has President Taylor read a prepared statement on live stream that will condemn America's actions on Sangala, Bauer reveals to Buchanan that he has filled the bunker space with explosive gas; it will kill most of Juma's men, but also whoever volunteers to set it off. Buchanan charges Jack with getting to the bottom of the conspiracy implied by Juma's call to Hodges, and ultimately sets off the bomb himself, sacrificing himself in the process. At the sound of the explosion, Moss's FBI agents breach the house without orders after the explosion is detected and eliminate Juma's men in a huge shootout, saving the President. Realizing his plans are ruined, Juma attempts to kill the President himself, but is unable to reach her as Bauer confronts him and ultimately shoots him dead. Afterwards, Bauer, mourning Bill's death, tells Moss about the phone call, and suggests he be allowed to speak to Ryan Burnett a second time, but when Moss declines, Walker goes behind his back and informs Kanin, who orders Moss to comply; hurt by Walker's actions, Moss decides to suspend her. Meanwhile, Allison decides to appoint Olivia as her special advisor, though Kanin disagrees because of Olivia's reckless previous actions. When Bauer and Moss arrive at the hospital and Bauer prepares to interrogate Burnett, Hodges' assistant, having anticipated the interrogation, sends an assassin, John Quinn, to kill Burnett and frame Jack for the act. The assassination and frame-up is successful, forcing Bauer to go on the run as Quinn escapes, with Bauer giving chase.
158	14	"Day 7: 9:00 p.m. – 10:00 p.m."	Brad Turner	Evan Katz & Juan Carlos Coto	March 16, 2009	7AFF14	11.36
Bauer, having obtained DVDs of security-camera footage from the hospital, sends Quinn's image to Walker for identification, and she informs Bauer that Quinn is affiliated with Starkwood, a private military company that is supervised by Hodges, also revealing that Mayer is currently investigating Starkwood's activities. Jack goes to Mayer's home and begins rifling through his files, trying to determine Starkwood's motivation. Meanwhile, Moss has figured out that Walker is aiding Bauer behind the scenes; she has passed him a file which turns out to be Sen. Mayer's home address, but it is encrypted to the point that Janis cannot crack it. Morris, who is on-site to inquire why his wife is under arrest, agrees to decrypt the file in exchange for Chloe's release. Meanwhile, Ken Dellao, a reporter asks Kanin about his authorization of the interrogation that caused the death of Burnett, and Kanin confronts Olivia for leaking the information, as this is exactly what got her fired from President Taylor's presidential campaign in the past, but Olivia is able to prove her innocence. Bauer and Mayer determine that Juma has allowed Starkwood to test a biological weapon on Sangalan citizens, and Mayer encourages Bauer to come forward with his accusations and allow the nation to fight on his behalf for once. Bauer accepts and prepares to surrender to the Metro PD, who have apparently arrived at Mayer's house, but when Mayer opens the door, the person who arrived is revealed to be Quinn in disguise. Quinn slays Mayer and chases Jack to a construction site, but Jack manages to gain the upper hand in the resulting fight and kills Quinn. Quinn's cell phone contains a location that may be a clue about the shipment and who else is involved, and Jack calls Almeida and asks him to meet him there.
159	15	"Day 7: 10:00 p.m. – 11:00 p.m."	Jon Cassar	Teleplay by : Alex Gansa; Story by : David Fury	March 23, 2009	7AFF15	10.37
Bauer and Almeida head to the location found on Quinn's phone, a freight yard, where they intercept a security guard, Carl Gadsen, who confesses his involvement with Starkwood mercenaries. Moss tells Kanin about his belief that Bauer has killed Mayer, which prompts Kanin to resign, while Olivia is revealed to have actually leaked the information as Kanin suspected. Moss also reaches out to Renee, admitting that forensic evidence (bullet holes where they shouldn't be, a door broken in Jack's escape) indicate the presence of a third party, and Renee confesses the Starkwood connection, causing Moss to decide to give Bauer the benefit of the doubt. Gadsen allows the Starkwood mercenaries in on Bauer's order, but as they start unloading the shipment, a mercenary takes Carl away to kill him. Almeida tries to dissuade Bauer from saving Carl in order to proceed with the mission, but Jack ultimately chooses saving a life first over continuing the mission, and saves Carl by shooting the mercenary dead. A shootout starts, and Almeida is captured while a mercenary starts driving the truck carrying the shipment, but Bauer intercepts it and takes the wheel, only to find the container damaged and its contents venting into the air. After the mercenaries arrive and reclaim the weapon, Bauer calls Moss, and tells him to send a Hazmat team to evaluate him for the biological agent: while Starkwood has the bioweapon in their possession, Jack has been exposed.
160	16	"Day 7: 11:00 p.m. – 12:00 a.m."	Jon Cassar	Manny Coto & Brannon Braga	March 30, 2009	7AFF16	11.27
The CDC Hazmat technicians start examining Bauer, while Almeida is brought to Starkwood, where Hodges orders his men to torture him for information. Starkwood's bioweapon is revealed to be a non-transmissible version of Creutzfeldt–Jakob disease which causes seizures, dementia and death within several days. President Taylor convenes her cabinet, but they are unable to find a satisfactory strategy (or legal precedent) for pre-emptive action. Allison then appoints Olivia as the Chief of Staff, and Olivia convinces Pierce, who has retired, to stay with her until the crisis is over. The FBI obtains evidence that Starkwood was using the Sangalan population to test the pathogen as the result of a deal made with Juma, and Moss reinstates Walker now that she is revealed to have been right to aid Bauer. Greg Seaton, Hodges' assistant, frees Almeida, claiming an intention to stop Hodges in exchange for immunity, which Allison signs. Seaton informs Almeida, Bauer and the FBI as to the location of the bioweapons, and Moss informs Bauer not to come along due to his condition. Seaton takes the FBI to a compound, which they find empty, and Starkwood mercenaries surround the FBI and demand that they leave, revealing that Seaton had actually led the FBI into a trap.
161	17	"Day 7: 12:00 a.m. – 1:00 a.m."	Brad Turner	Chip Johannessen	April 6, 2009	7AFF17	10.96
The FBI agents are forced to leave Starkwood, but Almeida secretly separates from them to continue searching for the bio weapons. As Allison orders the Air Force to prepare for an air strike, the FBI finds out that Doug Knowles, the Starkwood chairman, was secretly assisting Mayer with his investigation, and they contact Knowles and instruct him to help Almeida, who is able to enter a locked door with Knowles' help. However, Knowles gets captured and is brought to Hodges, who expresses his beliefs that Starkwood has periodically pulled the US government out of predicaments, and then kills Knowles, declaring that he will not be persecuted for "protecting his country". Almeida locates the canisters and informs the FBI, who gives them to the Air Force, but Hodges informs Allison that he has armed missiles with the pathogen ready for launch to populated regions, demanding that she abort the air strike, which she reluctantly does. Meanwhile, Jack starts showing symptoms of the exposure, and the physician informs him of an experimental therapy that requires the genes of a family member, suggesting his daughter Kim, which Jack declines. Meanwhile, Dellao forces Olivia to meet him in his hotel room to disclose the situation and have sex with him, but she secretly films this and later plays it to him, threatening to disclose it if he does not leave her alone.
162	18	"Day 7: 1:00 a.m. – 2:00 a.m."	Brad Turner	Teleplay by : Manny Coto & Brannon Braga; Story by : Howard Gordon	April 13, 2009	7AFF18	10.86
As Hodges arranges a meeting with Allison at the White House, Jack offers her a covert mission by Almeida to destroy the missiles, and she approves it by saying nothing. Almeida manages to find the missiles and captures the chief operative, forcing him to open the hatch to the chamber, and Almeida successfully plants explosives and detonates them. Without any leverage to bribe Allison with, Hodges is arrested for his crimes, but he reveals that he is part of a bigger secret society. Meanwhile, Walker informs Jack that Kim has arrived; he is initially angry with her for involving Kim, but she says that Kim had been attempting to contact him throughout the day since the Senate hearing. Jack visits Kim, and they reconcile their relationship, and Kim tells him that she is ready to try the potential procedure to save his life, though Jack is unwilling to go with it and convinces her to let him die, and she leaves, while Almeida finds out about Kim's presence. The FBI starts arresting Starkwood operatives and securing the premises, but an operative named Robert Galvez is revealed to be carrying a canister of the pathogen. He ultimately kills some agents and engages Moss and his team in an intense confrontation, with only Moss remaining, but Almeida suddenly kills Moss by suffocating him to death, instructing Galvez to leave.
163	19	"Day 7: 2:00 a.m. – 3:00 a.m."	Michael Klick	David Fury	April 20, 2009	7AFF19	10.34
Jack and Walker arrive at the scene, and while Jack begins to suspect that something is wrong, Galvez is tracked to a building, and the FBI surrounds it. Galvez lures the agents inside and causes an explosion that inflicts massive casualty, before posing as an agent as Almeida helps him leave the scene in an ambulance without attracting attention. Jack realizes the truth that Almeida had killed Moss and confronts him over his actions throughout the day, but collapses as a result of his condition, allowing Almeida to take his medications and leaves as the agents arrive to check on him, while Galvez takes control of the ambulance. Meanwhile, a woman named Cara Bowden disguises herself as Hodges' lawyer and visits him in detention, revealed to be working for his associates, and she gives him a pill to commit suicide, threatening his family if he does not comply. During transfer, Hodges takes the pill, and the guards call for medical care, while Kim calls her husband, Stephen, with whom she has a daughter named Teri, and informs him of her flight back to them in Los Angeles.
164	20	"Day 7: 3:00 a.m. – 4:00 a.m."	Michael Klick	Teleplay by : Alex Gansa & Chip Johannessen; Story by : Juan Carlos Coto	April 27, 2009	7AFF20	10.43
While Jack reveals Almeida's actions to the FBI, Almeida and Galvez escape to a motel, where Galvez attempts to double-cross him, but Almeida foils it and kills Galvez. Bowden, who is revealed to be romantically involved with Almeida, visits him, and she starts a secret Internet conference between the members of the secret society, where Almeida suggests that instead of replicating the remaining pathogen, they use it instead for one final attack to cripple the government, and shifting the blame to someone else. In a private chat with Alan Wilson, a member, Bowden convinces him to support Almeida's proposal, and the other members vote in favor of Almeida, who leads a team and captures two Middle-Eastern brothers named Jibraan and Hamid Al-Zarian. Meanwhile, Hodges is revealed to have survived his suicide attempt and is taken to a hidden location, where he reveals that the secret society consists of military company owners who planned the day's attacks in order to paralyze the government, who would then enlist the help of the private sector. Jack deduces that Almeida is planning another attack while diverting attention from the companies, and enlists the help of Chloe. Hodges is granted witness protection, which greatly infuriates Olivia as he had killed her brother, and she calls a man named Martin Collier, arranging a meeting to discuss Hodges.
165	21	"Day 7: 4:00 a.m. – 5:00 a.m."	Brad Turner	Manny Coto & Brannon Braga	May 4, 2009	7AFF21	10.11
After Almeida threatens to kill Hamid if Jibraan does not follow Almeida's instructions, Jibraan announces responsibility for the upcoming attack and promises more in front of the camera. He is then forced to tell a shocked Hamid that he is actually working with Almeida's team to attack the U.S., and Almeida's team and Jibraan leave while one operative stays to watch Hamid. Chloe finds out about Jibraan by his Internet activity, which is actually faked by Almeida, and Jack and Walker head to the neighborhood mosque and question the cleric, who agrees to take them to the Al-Zarians' apartment, where the FBI storms in and Hamid critically wounds the operative, while Almeida's target is revealed to be a subway station. Meanwhile, Olivia is paid a visit by Collier in her office, and she says that she is determined to have Hodges killed, and he leaves to arrange for the plan. A professional hitman calls Olivia and tells her to transfer the money to his account for the hit, but she begins to have second thoughts over her actions and changes her mind, choosing not to transfer the money. However, while Hodges is leaving to be transported for witness protection, he is killed when the car he is in explodes; it is soon revealed that a bomb was placed in the car. Learning of Hodges' assassination, a shocked Olivia calls Collier, who arranges another meeting outside.
166	22	"Day 7: 5:00 a.m. – 6:00 a.m."	Brad Turner	Evan Katz	May 11, 2009	7AFF22	9.79
Jack tortures the captured operative, who reveals a phone number for Almeida, which he calls, and the FBI tracks Almeida's location. Jibraan is given an ear piece and instructed to enter the station where he tries to alert the cops, but a corrupt officer demands that he follow the instructions in the earpiece, and he enters a train, where Bowden leaves the canister in a bag. Jack's team captures Almeida, and after Jack tortures Almeida and calls him out over his betrayal, he contacts Jibraan, who manages to find the canister and get it to Jack, who puts the canister in a chamber for safe detonation, causing no casualties. At the airport, a man, along with his female partner, strike up a friendly conversation with Kim, who is waiting for her flight. However, the man and his partner are revealed to be operatives working for Bowden, and after the man kills an FBI agent assigned to ensure Kim's safety, the pair secretly records live footage of Kim, while Bowden calls Jack and shows him the footage, demanding that he free Almeida. Meanwhile, Collier reveals to Olivia that despite Olivia's second thoughts, he told the assassin to go through with assassinating Hodges anyway, and ultimately convinces Olivia to transfer the money. Pierce gets suspicious of Olivia's activities and asks Kanin how to access her phone conversation logs, which Kanin states that only he can do, and arranges a meeting with Pierce at the White House.
167	23	"Day 7: 6:00 a.m. – 7:00 a.m."	Jon Cassar	David Fury & Alex Gansa	May 18, 2009	7AFF23	9.65
Under Bowden's orders, Jack forcibly orders the FBI to release Almeida and drive to the destination where Bowden is at, although Jack quickly manages to reveal to Walker the reason why he is doing this, and tells her to find a way to save Kim. Upon arriving at Bowden's location, Almeida decides to take Jack with him, telling Bowden that they can extract the pathogen from Jack and replicate it. A captured Jack is taken to a warehouse, where technicians start experiments on him, and Bowden arranges a meeting between Wilson and Almeida now that the latter has proven his capability and apparent loyalty. However, Jack manages to free himself and escape the warehouse, with Almeida and Bowden giving chase. Meanwhile, Walker alerts Kim of Bowden's operatives, who start a shootout with airport security, while the woman attempts to take Kim hostage, but Kim quickly manages to escape the woman's clutches, allowing security to shoot the woman to death. As the man tries to escape, Kim follows him to his car, which he attempts to escape in, but security causes him to crash, and the car burns with the man inside, while Kim manages to extract his laptop, which can be used to trace Almeida and Bowden. In the meantime, Kanin arrives at the White House and after Pierce explains his belief about Olivia's involvement in Hodges' death, Kanin accesses the logs and takes a memory card. Olivia detains him, destroys the card he is carrying, and frees him, but unknown to Olivia, Kanin is revealed to have anticipated that and had given the real card to Pierce, who returns it, allowing Kanin to listen to the recording that incriminates Olivia in the death of Hodges.
168	24	"Day 7: 7:00 a.m. – 8:00 a.m."	Jon Cassar	Teleplay by : Howard Gordon; Story by : Manny Coto & Brannon Braga	May 18, 2009	7AFF24	9.65
Jack is captured by Almeida, who reveals that Alan Wilson was one of the masterminds of the events of Day 5, and thus, Michelle Dessler's death, and reveals that his real plan is to kill Wilson, while he has tried to save the country as his secondary objective during the day, and then puts a bomb on Jack, intending to kill Wilson and Jack with it. As Wilson and his operatives arrive, the FBI suddenly attacks and a battle starts, forcing Wilson and Bowden to attempt to flee. Jack manages to remove the bomb and he pursues Almeida, who kills Bowden and desperately tries to kill Wilson, but is ultimately stopped by Jack, and a defeated and raging Almeida is arrested and taken away, while Wilson denies any involvement in the day's events. In the aftermath, Jack is taken back to the FBI and advises Walker to make choices that she can live with, not those aligning with the law, and Walker later enters Wilson's detention room and decides to torture him for information. Meanwhile, Kanin plays the tape to Allison incriminating Olivia in Hodges' murder and entrusts it to her, and Allison expresses her shock and disappointment with Olivia over her actions. Henry tries to convince her to destroy it, but Allison ultimately refuses to cover up her daughter's crime, and regrettably informs the Justice Department about it, causing Olivia to be arrested. Back at CPL, having chosen to accept his apparent fate, Jack lies in an induced coma, but Kim ultimately convinces the physician to prepare for the treatment mentioned to potentially save his life. As the stem cell procedure is prepared, Kim stands by her father's side, telling him she is not ready to let him go.

== Production ==
Producers were determined to reinvent the series after receiving criticism over the sixth season. They initially devised a storyline which would have Jack Bauer traveling to Sangala trying to find himself, and becoming caught up in a coup with Black Hawk Down-style results.

"The fact is, it was a mutual issue," explains Gordon. "We struggled to do something new this year. We sent Jack Bauer, to Africa and I wrote a script that honestly did not work. Before the network even saw it at the studio level, we were getting kick-back from the idea, especially once we budgeted what Africa would cost. It was a combination of the studio was not enthusiastic to shoot there for budgetary purposes and creatively, it didn't feel like it warranted pushing our case. One day, at the IHOP, I sat across Joel and Bob and we all agreed this story wasn't working and retooled it two weeks ago."

The decision to scrap the storyline and start over delayed production from July to late August. Filming was delayed a second time (from August 27 to September 10) in order for writers to complete additional scripts.

The crew was scheduled to film scenes with Kiefer Sutherland at the Marine Corps Air Station El Toro on Monday October 22, 2007; however, filming was canceled for health reasons due to raging wildfires in the area. Cast and crew had blurry vision and difficulty breathing from the smoke. United States Navy SEALs helped battle fictional terrorists at Camarillo Airport during filming of an episode on August 12–13, 2008.

After completion of the 18th episode, production was temporarily shut down on September 15, 2008, for two weeks in order to perform script rewrites for the final six episodes. In an Entertainment Weekly interview, Howard Gordon responded "We just couldn't get this direction to work, and we found another one that we liked better, so we wound up retooling it."

Executive producer and 24 co-creator Joel Surnow left the series on February 12, 2008. His contract with 20th Century Fox was due to expire on April 30 but he requested an early release. "I did some soul-searching. I took [the strike] as an opportunity to write on my own and do other things. After doing 24, I don't know if I want to do a mainstream show again. I like what's going on in cable; there is an opportunity to stretch dramatically there, which is something I'm trying to do." Series co-creator and executive producer Robert Cochran also left the show after the twelfth episode. The position held by Surnow was filled by showrunner Howard Gordon.

Season 7 was dedicated to the memory of Larry Davenport, who was the assistant editor and editor since the first season. He died January 19, 2009.

Tony Almeida was seemingly killed in Season 5, but was revealed to be alive in this seventh season. Showrunner Howard Gordon mentioned in an interview that they purposely filmed Tony's death in a way that would allow his eventual return.

=== Trailer ===
Jack Bauer testifying.

The debut trailer aired on October 25, 2007. In the trailer, Jack is seen testifying before Congress concerning his past extralegal activities, including the torture of terrorist Ibrahim Haddad. The international version of the trailer is largely identical but features an additional line where Bauer implies personal enjoyment from torturing a suspect. This line is cut from the US version.

A second trailer emphasized the plot concerning the United States losing control of its power lines, water supplies and air traffic control. Jon Cassar confirmed on the Fox message board that the 24: Redemption DVD would have a new alternate trailer for the season as an extra feature and that it contains scenes from the first fourteen episodes.

=== Writers Guild of America strike ===
On October 25, 2007, Fox premiered the first trailer and announced the return date for season 7 as January 13, 2008. Just eleven days later, on November 5, 2007, the 2007–2008 Writers Guild of America strike began. Rather than airing the eight completed episodes, Fox executives immediately postponed the season to ensure that it "can air uninterrupted, in its entirety." Fox scheduling chief, Preston Beckman, admitted "It's not a decision we wanted to make, but it's one based on how we feel the viewers expect us to schedule the show."

Following the conclusion of the writers strike, production resumed on April 22, 2008.

Kiefer Sutherland claims the strike was beneficial to the show: "The time allowed us to do something that has never been done before — create a map of the entire season before we started shooting. So I can tell you without hesitation, I know for a fact, that season 7 is going to be the best season yet." Sutherland reiterated this in an interview with TV Guide on August 18, 2008.

=== 24: Redemption ===
To make up for the lack of any 24 episodes in 2008, Fox aired a two-hour TV movie on Sunday, November 23, 2008, that bridges the gap between seasons 6 and 7.

The storyline takes place during Inauguration Day for the next U.S. President, Allison Taylor, and is shot partially in South Africa. "[Jack] is a soul in turmoil and has been moving from place to place trying to find somewhere he can be at peace," says co-executive producer, Manny Coto. "But he winds up in Sangala, an imaginary country in Africa in the middle of a military coup." While at Sangala, Bauer is subpoenaed to appear before the Senate hearing, but he doesn't want to go. Redemption takes place approximately 42 months after Day 6 and Day 7 takes place 65 days after Redemption.

=== Energy reduction ===
Howard Gordon said that 24 cares about the issue of global warming and takes fighting climate change seriously. Measures were taken during the filming of season 7 to make the show carbon neutral. These measures include increased energy efficiency (hybrid vehicles), burning of cleaner fuels (natural gas, biodiesel), and purchase of renewable energy. Through these efforts, the crew was able to reduce the carbon emissions of the show's production by 43%. The remaining emissions will be eliminated with the purchase of carbon offsets. In addition, a series of PSAs with Kiefer Sutherland and other main cast members were produced to educate the public on what they can do to help with the issue.

== Reception ==
On Rotten Tomatoes, the season has an approval rating of 76% with an average score of 8.3 out of 10 based on 33 reviews. The website's critical consensus reads, "New characters and old faces appear as 24 begins to challenge the ethics and morals of its characters."

Cherry Jones, who played President Allison Taylor, won the Emmy for Best Supporting Actress in a Drama Series, becoming the second Emmy Award-winning performer of the show, after Kiefer Sutherland in 2006. IGN's review of Season 7 praises Jon Voight's performance as Jonas Hodges saying "Hodges ends up being more of a Bond villain than a 24 villain – over the top at times, but creative and willing to stop at nothing to execute his plan." The same review disapproves of the season's focus on the politics of torture saying "it was a bit much, putting too much real world politics into what in the past has been great escapist entertainment." On the review aggregator website Metacritic, the seventh season scored 72 out of 100, based on 21 reviews, indicating "generally favorable" reviews and was considered a huge improvement over the previous season.

=== Award nominations ===
Organization	Category	Nominee(s)	Result
Primetime Emmy Awards	Outstanding Supporting Actress in a Drama Series	Cherry Jones	Won
Primetime Emmy Awards	Outstanding Music Composition for a Series, Dramatic Underscore	Sean Callery	Nominated
Primetime Emmy Awards	Outstanding Sound Mixing for a Comedy or Drama Series, One Hour	William Gocke, Mike Olman, Ken Kobett	Nominated
Primetime Emmy Awards	Outstanding Sound Editing for a Series	William Dotson, Cathie Speakman, Pembrooke Andrews, Jeffrey Whitcher, Shawn Kennelly, Melissa Kennelly, Daryl Fontenault, Jeff Charbonneau, Laura Macias, Vince Nicastro	Nominated
Primetime Emmy Awards	Outstanding Single-Camera Picture Editing for a Drama Series	Scott Powell	Nominated
Primetime Emmy Awards	Outstanding Stunt Coordination for a Drama Series	Jeff Cadiente	Nominated
Screen Actors Guild Awards	Outstanding Performance by a Stunt Ensemble in a Television Series	Jeff Cadiente, Brian Hite, Norman Howell, Christopher Leps, Dustin Meier, John Meier, Gary Price, Jimmy Sharp, Jr., Erik Stabenau, Justin Sundquist	Won
Satellite Awards	Best Supporting Actress	Cherry Jones	Nominated

== Home media releases ==
The seventh season was released on DVD and Blu-ray in region 1 on May 19, 2009 and in region 2 on October 19, 2009.
