= Renee Walker =

Character from the television series 24

- 24 character
- First appearance: Day 7 – Episode 1
- Last appearance: Day 8 – Episode 18
- Portrayed by: Annie Wersching
- Days: 7, 8

In-universe information
- Occupation: FBI Special Agent

Renee Walker is a fictional character in the TV series 24, portrayed by Annie Wersching. She is an FBI special agent appearing in seasons 7 and 8.

== Concept and creation ==
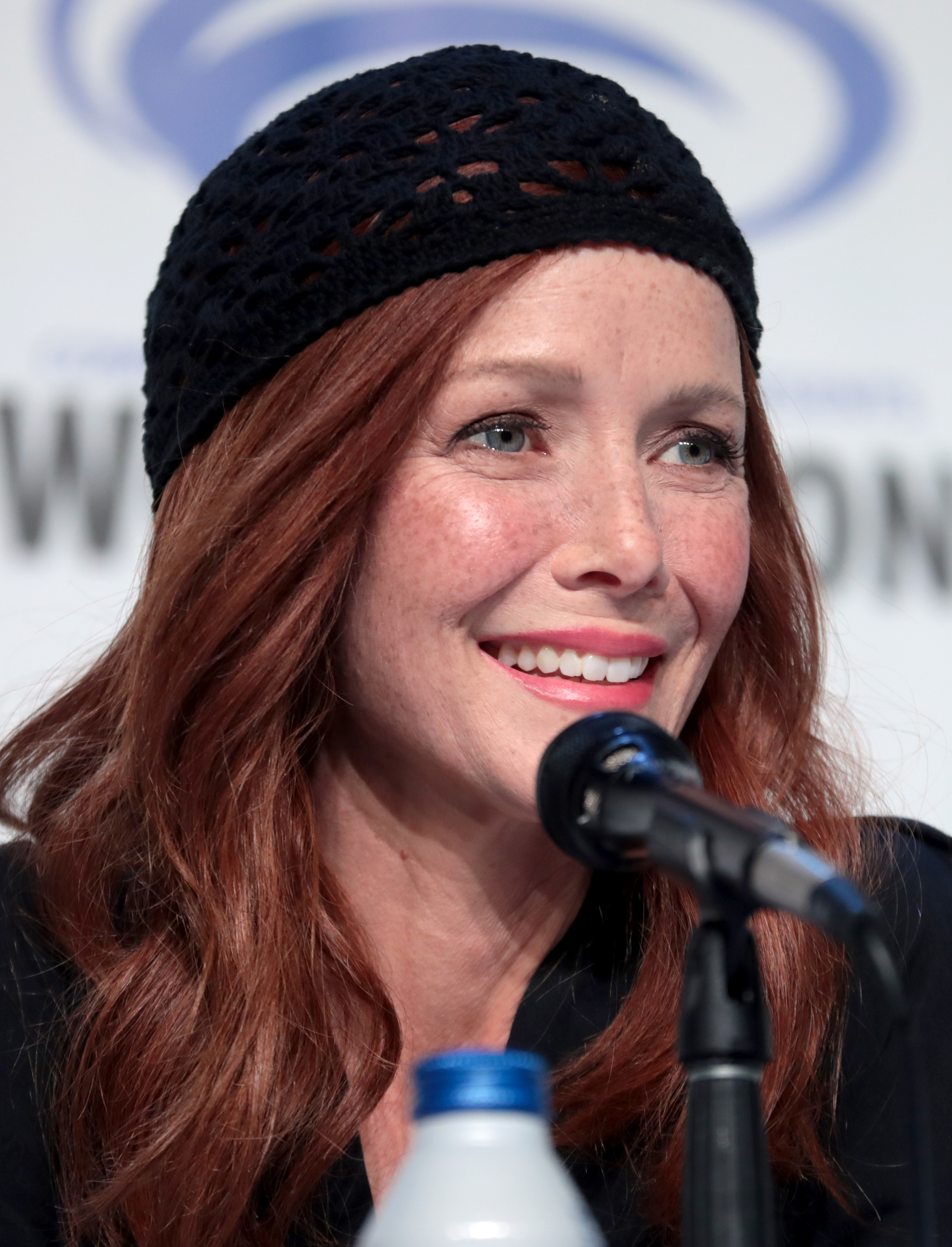
Annie Wersching, who portrayed Walker

Wersching previously had worked together with 24 crew members on a failed television pilot titled Company Man.

She was cast for the part of Renee Walker a week before filming began, saying that "they spent a long time trying to figure this role out. They toyed with the coldness of her and went back and forward a lot."

"The story is being told from her point of view," reveals the show's executive producer, Howard Gordon. "She is somebody who has probably pressed up against the limitations of what's been allowed [according to the law]. Her soul is in balance in the question. Is it worth doing whatever's necessary at the personal price it extracts?"

== Characterization ==
Throughout the series, Renee is portrayed as tough and strong-willed and has been shown to disobey orders or push the limits of the law when she believes such actions are necessary. Throughout Day 7, she takes in what Jack Bauer does and gradually becomes more rogue and puts justice before the job. When first meeting Jack, Renee is reluctant to do things that Jack Bauer would do in order to get what they need (such as torture), but by the end of Day 7, she resorts to torture in order to get the answers that she needs.

== Appearances ==
=== Season 7 ===
In the series, Renee is introduced when she pulls Jack Bauer out of a Senate hearing so he can advise and aid the FBI in tracking down Tony Almeida, who has been involved in terrorist activities. Over time, she gives him more power, allowing him to interrogate Almeida. After Jack subdues her and escapes with Almeida, her anger and guilt over his betrayal lead her to torture a prisoner for information and attempt to track Jack and Tony down personally. While observing them assisting Emerson in the kidnapping of Ule Matobo, she is captured. Jack convinces Emerson to keep her alive temporarily, but is later ordered to shoot her. Jack deliberately shoots off-center, only grazing her neck, but is forced to bury her alive as she plays dead.

She temporarily dies, only to be resuscitated by Bill and Chloe, who explain the situation and the need for her to remain "dark" from the FBI and bring her into their operation.

She aids their operation by using her FBI credentials to bypass security at the building where Dubaku is operating and participates in the assault on Dubaku's control center, resulting in the destruction of the CIP device and the Matobos rescue.

A meeting between the Matobos and the President is arranged, where they explain the situation to her and Ethan Kanin. Renee convinces Jack to trust Larry Moss for help tracking Edward Vossler. To coerce him into talking, Renee goes to Vossler's house and takes his wife and child hostage. With his family in danger, Vossler gives Jack the location of Dubaku's hideout, where Henry Taylor is being held captive, but then attempts to overpower Jack and is killed. Renee is shaken up when Jack informs her of Vossler's death but resolves to continue on. Renee and Jack meet at Dubaku's hideout but are unable to prevent Taylor from being shot and seriously wounded during the rescue attempt.

Larry Moss scolds Renee for her actions involving Vossler's family, but Renee defends her actions as necessary, even though she may not be comfortable with them. Jack and Renee then travel to the residence of Marika Donoso, whom Dubaku has developed a relationship with under an assumed identity and who is preparing to leave the country with Dubaku, along with her sister Rosa. After learning of Dubaku's true identity, Marika agrees to help them by keeping her meeting with Dubaku and allowing Jack and Renee to track them. Rosa objects, but Renee promises to keep Marika safe. While trailing Dubaku and Marika, Jack and Renee run into a police roadblock and are arrested.

With their arrest sorted out and overturned, Jack and Renee resume tracking Dubaku, chasing him until Marika causes Dubaku's car to crash, killing her and seriously injuring Dubaku. Renee is visibly shaken up and after being confronted by Rosa, gets into an argument with Jack in which she slaps him. A kiss was originally scripted into the scene but was written out. Wersching commented that a kiss for that moment would be too much of a cliché.

At the hospital, Dubaku is killed by an assassin sent by Juma. Renee tracks the assassin, which leads her to the Potomac, where Juma is assembling his forces. When Juma and his men leave, Renee jumps to their boat, where she discovers their target to be the White House.

During Juma's siege of the White House, Renee and Larry helped coordinate rescue operations and counterattacks. Later, Jack relays intelligence from Bill on another pending threat, but when he and Renee bring this information to Larry, Larry has Jack arrested, stating he'll "look into it". Renee approaches Ethan Kanin, who orders Larry to allow Jack to proceed with the investigation. Larry suspends Renee indefinitely, saying he can no longer trust her.

During her suspension, Jack is framed for the murders of Ryan Burnett and Senator Mayer. Jack contacts Renee secretly, so she helps him identify and track the killer. She is discovered, though, when a message is intercepted and is arrested. She returns to active duty once Jack is cleared of the murders. She is visibly upset when she discovers that Jack has been fatally exposed to the bioweapon during his attempt to secure it. Afterward, she debriefs Jack back at FBI headquarters, and both of them help coordinate the subsequent raid on the Starkwood compound and Almeida's search for the bioweapon, eventually resulting in its successful destruction.

Renee also encourages Jack to try the experimental procedure suggested by his doctors; using a sample of genetically compatible stem cells from a close relative may cure him of the pathogen's effects and save his life. Jack refuses treatment, and Renee looks into his file. When Kim calls looking for her father, Renee explains the situation to her without Jack's knowledge, upsetting him and causing an emotional clash.

After Larry Moss is killed by Almeida and Galvez in their successful theft of the last canister of the bioweapon, she is visibly upset and personally leads the search for Galvez, Almeida not having been discovered yet. Renee is inside the abandoned building wired with explosives by Galvez when it explodes, but a warning from Jack saves her. After Jack tells her the truth about Almeida, she puts on an APB alert to capture him, though he manages to escape. Renee and Jack later follow up a lead on Jibraan Al-Zarian, who they believe may be involved with the terrorists. Eventually, they locate and raid Jibraan's house, freeing his brother, but are one step behind Almeida and his team, who have already left, having managed to coerce Jibraan into helping them, and are preparing to launch their attack.

At one point in the series, Renee and Jack manage to recapture Almeida, only to have Jack commandeer the vehicle and help Tony escape. As he is doing so, Jack explains that Tony's accomplices have operatives in place, placing his daughter's life in danger, and asks Renee to save her. Renee calls Kim at the airport and warns her about the operatives, but the call is cut off. As security closes in, a firefight breaks out. Renee arrives to find Kim safe after chasing a surviving operative into a parking garage. With Kim's help, she is able to locate Jack and goes with a team to rescue him. Renee is able to disarm an explosive device that Tony has attached to Jack, and the two are able to apprehend Tony just as he is about to exact his revenge for his wife's death on Alan Wilson, the head of the conspiracy. Wilson calmly denies all involvement and refuses to cooperate, so Renee seeks out Jack for advice. She tells him that she knows they do not have a case against Wilson, so he has no reason to cooperate. She also knows that if the rest of his organization is not brought to justice, they will strike again, and she does not know if she will be able to live with herself knowing she could have stopped it. He tells her that he cannot tell her what to do because he has been wrestling with those kinds of problems all his life. For him, when he sees innocent lives in danger, everything else becomes less important, and he will do whatever it takes to save those lives. He denies regretting anything that he has done today but reminds her that she works for the FBI. As such, she has to uphold the law, a law that Jack knows (in his mind) has to be more important than innocent lives; but he does not think his heart could bear to see the lives lost. He tells her the only advice he can give is that she try to make the decisions she can live with. An emotional Renee tells him she does not know what to say, and Jack gently caresses her face and tells her not to say anything. Jack is then taken to the hospital, and Renee takes Wilson to FBI headquarters. Renee enters Wilson's holding room and shuts down all the monitoring equipment. When Janis interrupts with a form for Renee to sign and refuses to leave when she realizes what Renee intends to do, Renee subdues her, forcing her to handcuff herself. Despite Janis' pleas, she puts down her FBI badge, enters the holding room, and closes the door.

=== Season 8 ===
In Season 8 of the series, Renee Walker returns in episode 4 of the 8th season and is now a former FBI special agent after an incident with Alan Wilson in season 7 (it is implied that she tortured him to near death). She is summoned to CTU because of her unique knowledge of the Russian Syndicate in New York after having worked as an undercover agent in their ranks six years prior. Brian Hastings, the current director of CTU, requests that she resume her undercover identity to set up a competing buy for the nuclear fuel rods President Hassan's brother is attempting to procure. Unhappy with her decision to go back undercover, Jack attempts to convince her that she is too mentally fragile to handle the operation.

Despite her inability to return to a normal life, and recent suicide attempt, Renee decides that she will indeed agree to go back undercover. After Jack fails to dissuade Brian Hastings from allowing Renee to go back undercover, he volunteers his field experience as her partner in the operation. The initial stage of the operation involves locating the head of the Russian Syndicate in New York, a man named Vladimir Laitanin. Renee visits an old accomplice in the mob, who is presently on parole, to convince him to take her and Jack to Vladimir.

After a brief conversation with her contact, he declines to help her because of the monitoring device attached to his arm, which is part of the conditions of his parole. She convinces the contact that she is able to remove the device without alerting the authorities. She then proceeds to place her contact's arm in a vise and without warning removes his thumb and the device with a nearby power saw. Upon hearing the contact's screams, Jack rushes into the contacts shop to see what Renee has done and says that she has gone too far.

Jack is persuaded by Renee to continue the mission, and the contact drives Renee to Vladimir as Jack follows. Renee is put through a "test" of sorts by Vladimir, to make sure she is legit. He believes her cover and she is in. She tells Vladimir that she has a buyer for him (Ernst Meier, who is Jack undercover), someone who is interested in fuel rods. He has connections, and she wants him to call them. Laitanin agrees with a steep price of five million to make the calls alone.

She excuses herself to use the shower. She tells Jack over comm that she is going dark. She sleeps with Laitanin to keep her cover. Laitanin reveals to her that his plan is to take the five million "Meier" is willing to pay for Laitanin's phone calls and kill Meier in the process. Renee tries to warn Jack, but Vladimir chokes her, taking the phone away from her. He tells her not to go against him ever again. Meanwhile, Jack is meeting with Laitanin's men in a parking lot. Jack has agent Ortiz and his men set so they can take the men out if need be. Laitanin's men do attempt to eliminate Jack, but Ortiz saves him by eliminating three of the men with support from a sniper on top of a distant building. Jack subdues the fourth and final man and forces Laitanin to meet with him.

After talking with Laitanin, and asking to talk to Renee and being denied, Jack transfers the money. Laitanin's men have their orders to kill Jack, but before their chance, they are killed by Ortiz. Jack is furious at Lugov (Laitanin's man) and orders him to take him to Vladimir to finish their deal. In the next hour, Jack and Lugov arrive at Laitanin's safe house. Jack asks to speak with Renee privately, and she assures Vladimir that it is fine.

Out of earshot, Jack tells Renee that he plans to take her out of play so that he can go undercover in her place. She refuses, saying that she is the only reason Laitanin is still going along with the deal and that pulling her out now will make what she has done for nothing. Laitanin interrupts them, saying that they need to start making calls before the deal takes place. Renee, Jack, and Laitanin go back into his office and he begins making calls. As he hangs up with another contact who knows nothing, he asks Renee to cut him some bread.

He offers a vodka to Jack, which he takes, reluctantly. He goes back to Renee and suggestively helps her cut the bread, thanking "Meier" for breaking in Renee in the six years since he'd seen her. Jack tells him to stop wasting time and make more phone calls. Laitanin gets angry and sends Jack out to wait with Lugov and his other man out to get more vodka. Laitanin apologizes for the late hour before announcing that he has a business proposition regarding nuclear rods newly on the market.

Knowing that Bazhaev is the only person with an organization that could pull off such a deal, he offers to put him on the phone with a buyer, but Bazhaev furiously denies any knowledge, saying that nobody deals in nuclear materials, and hangs up. Laitanin tells Renee that nobody knows anything about her supposed deal and threatens to give up. She manages to persuade him to keep trying.

Jack gets up and moves toward the office, trying to hear what's happening inside. Laitanin hangs up with Roman, who had no knowledge of the rods, and tells Renee that he has called all his contacts and none of them have turned up anything useful. He ignores her pleas that he keep making calls, saying that they have five million dollars, and each other, which isn't so bad. He is angered when she reveals that she only came for the deal, not him, and punches her in the face. Losing control, she grabs the knife and stabs Laitanin in the eye, proceeding to stab him several times in the throat and chest. She ends up impaling him 17 times. Jack races into the office and tries to pull her off him, only for Renee to spin around and stab Jack.

Horrified, she watches as Jack collapses, while Lugov enters and prepares to shoot her. Before he can do so, Jack pulls out the knife and flings it across the room, burying it in Lugov's throat. He then readies his gun and shoots through the wall into the adjacent garage, killing the other guard outside. Jack goes over to Renee and hugs her, noticing the state of Laitanin's body, while she begins to cry.

She tells Jack that she doesn't have anything or anyone. He replies that she has him. Jack and Renee talk about what happened to Vladimir, and Renee seems to need convincing that it was, in fact, self-defense. She doesn't think it would work since she stabbed Valdimir so many times. Jack tells her it was just that, nothing else. It was self-defense. Meanwhile, Jack calls Cole and tells him and his team to come pick them up. He also tells him what happened to Laitanin and his men. It is clear to Jack that someone Vladimir called has to know something, so they start there. Cole tells Jack that he and his team are 10 minutes out. Jack and Renee hear the team entering, and Jack comments that they really did rush over to them. It turns out that it is Bazhaev's men. He allows himself to be captured after assuring Renee's safety in a water heater closet in the bathroom.

When Cole's team gets there, they send video of the safe house. Renee comes out of hiding and immediately wants to know where they took Jack, and Cole says he had no idea what she;s talking about. She tells him she's talking about the Russians. She then asks him about the drones they have, and Cole tells her no movement has been detected outside the warehouse.

Meanwhile, Jack is seen in the tunnel system with Bazhaev's men. Jack is tortured but ultimately gets free and gets Bazhaev personally. He makes a deal with him, giving him and his son, Josef, immunity. He tells them where the rods are, so they send a team out, but the fuel rods are gone. Jack eventually finds his way back to CTU.

Renee is taken back to CTU. They want a statement from her and a psychiatric evaluation done on her in medical. Chloe takes her statement. Hastings gets a call from the DoJ, and they tell him that CTU and Hastings will not take the fall for this (Laitanin's death and the supposed dead end in finding the fuel rods). The DoJ suggests that Renee take the fall, and he tells Hastings that they are sending someone from their office to interview Renee.

Jack calls CTU and gets Chloe. After talking to her, he asks her to patch him through to Renee. Renee asks him what he meant when he said that she has him, and he tells her that he meant it just like it sounded. She asks him what they do next, and he says that they will figure it out.

Jack figures out that they are setting Renee up to have her take the fall, and he busts into the interrogation and chokes the DoD woman, throwing her against the wall. He then leaves with Renee, only to be stopped at the door by a guard. He tells the guard that he better put his weapon away because he's only going to get hurt. Jack and Renee attempt to leave the room, only Jack ends up on the floor, after being shocked with a stun gun. Jack is taken into custody and to Hastings's office, while Renee is taken to medical. Later, Hastings agrees to drop the charges against Walker only if Jack will help CTU until the entire threat is over.

After CTU is taken out by the EMP bomb, Chloe calls Renee to say Jack is missing. She tells Chloe to "do what you have to" to get CTU back online. She leaves to find Jack at the docks area. Just as one of the snipers lines up to kill Jack, she takes him out with a shot to his head. Seconds later, she kills the remaining sniper, saving Jack and Agent Ortiz.

After failing to rescue Hassan, Renee goes to Jack's apartment with him and the two have sex. Shortly after talking with Chloe and being informed that Samir (who executed Hassan) has died, Renee says that she recognized one of the EMTs as possibly being part of the Russian crime ring she infiltrated years ago. Following this, she is shot by a sniper. Jack rushes her to the hospital, but she eventually dies. Renee's death is honored with the final silent clock of the episode.

Her death prompts Jack to seek violent retribution against those responsible. Among others, he brutally tortures and kills the sniper Pavel Tokarev and also kills CTU mole Dana Walsh and Russian foreign minister Mikhail Novakovich (along with seven of his bodyguards). He had planned to assassinate President Yuri Suvarov before being talked out of it by Chloe O'Brian, who told him that Renee would not want him to do this in her name.

== Critical reception ==
Ken Tucker described the character as "dishy" and adds that this "fresh character...mingles nicely with familiar faces." NY Post journalist Jarret Wieselman said Walker's clothes never "looked sharper or sexier" on any other character.
