= Kim Bauer =

Fictional character

- 24 character
- Elisha Cuthbert as Kim Bauer
- First appearance: Day 1 – Episode 1
- Last appearance: Day 8 – Episode 2
- Created by: Joel Surnow; Robert Cochran
- Portrayed by: Elisha Cuthbert
- Days: 1, 2, 3, 5, 7, 8
- Other Appearances: 24: The Game

In-universe information
- Family: Jack Bauer (father); Teri Bauer (mother); Phillip Bauer (paternal grandfather); Graem Bauer (paternal uncle); Josh Bauer (cousin)
- Spouse: Stephen Wesley
- Children: Teri Wesley (daughter); Unnamed son

Kimberly 'Kim' Bauer is a fictional character played by Elisha Cuthbert on the television series 24. She is portrayed as the only daughter of the show's main character, Jack Bauer and his wife Teri. She is a former CTU analyst turned field agent and was a main cast member for the show's first three seasons and has made main guest appearances in other seasons.

Within the 24 storyline, Kim is on multiple occasions brought into perilous situations, causing Jack Bauer's motives to shift from professional to personal. She has also worked under her father as an agent at the Los Angeles Counter Terrorist Unit.

== Characterization ==
Kimberly Bauer was born in Santa Monica, California, in 1984, to Jack and Teri Bauer. She dropped out of Santa Monica High School but obtained an associate degree in Computer Programming at Santa Monica College. She then pursues a career at the Counter Terrorist Unit in Los Angeles.

== Appearances ==
=== 24: Season 1 ===
Kim and her friend, Janet York, sneak out of their homes to meet college men Dan and Rick, who eventually kidnap the girls. Although both girls escape, Kim is re-captured and taken to Ira Gaines, who holds her in an attempt to control her father. Soon Teri Bauer is also captured. However, Rick and Jack Bauer assist them in an escape.

Once freed, Kim and Teri are sent to a safe house. They flee when it is attacked by one of Victor Drazen's thugs, but split up after a car crash so Kim goes to visit Rick to find help. As she leaves Rick's house, Kim is held up by the drug dealer Frank, who is Dan's brother. As other drug dealers arrive, Frank pulls out a gun. The dealers turn out to be undercover police and everyone, including Kim, is arrested. Kim tells the policemen that she has nothing to do with the drug deal and that she is Jack Bauer's daughter. The policemen confirm this and release Kim. As Kim is being driven to CTU in a police car, the car is attacked and Kim is recaptured. She is taken to Victor Drazen where her father is also being held. Jack is allowed to leave but Kim stays with the Drazens. Jack later makes a deal with the Drazens to trade himself for Kim, to which they agree. Kim escapes and returns, safe, to CTU, and embraces her father at the end of the day. Moments after the reunion, Jack finds Kim's mother, Teri Bauer, dead.

=== 24: Season 2 ===
Kim doesn't deal with her mother's death well and drops out of school, becoming an au pair with the Mathesons, a family from Los Angeles. When Jack discovers the plot to detonate a nuclear bomb, he tries to relocate Kim, requesting that she be evacuated if he returns to CTU.

Kim does not respond to Jack's request, but does find herself in serious trouble when she discovers Megan Matheson, her charge, is being abused by her father Gary. Protecting Megan, Kim implores the two should escape Los Angeles, which they proceed to do. This is complicated by the pursuit of Gary, who has inflicted medical problems upon Megan, which only causes additional issues with their escape. Eventually, Kim, her boyfriend Miguel, and Megan leave the hospital by stealing Gary's car, but when they are pulled over for speeding, the highway patrol officer discovers blood dripping from the trunk. Inside is Megan's mother, Carla. Kim and Miguel are arrested for suspected murder and taken back to Los Angeles.

While Miguel and Kim are being transferred to another station, Miguel starts a fire that causes the crash of the transport vehicle. He is too injured to flee, but Kim is not. She loses herself in the wilderness of the Angeles National Forest and is caught in a cougar trap. She is rescued by a survivalist. However, he tells her the bomb has been detonated, and takes her to his fallout shelter. Soon discovering that he lied, Kim confronts him and leaves.

Kim hitchhikes out, and borrows a cell phone to contact CTU. There, she is put in contact with Jack, who is flying the bomb to the desert for safe detonation. Kim breaks down when she realizes her father won't be coming back, and profusely apologizes for her behavior towards him. Jack tells her that nothing was her fault and that he wants her to become someone who would have made her mom proud. Tony Almeida later tells her Jack wasn't in the plane when the bomb was detonated, that George Mason took over.

Kim also has some major problems throughout the rest of the day, such as being in a convenience store when it is robbed, and later turns herself in to the police, only to learn that she is no longer a suspect, as the police had confirmed that Gary Matheson killed his wife. Later, when she goes back to the Mathesons house to pack up her belongings, Gary appears, having shot her police escort. When he proves ready to kill her, Jack tells her to shoot him, which she does, and later, Kate Warner is sent to pick up Kim, who is overwhelmed. She ends the season in the arms of her father, who is going to a hospital for the treatment of the wounds inflicted on him during the day.

=== 24: The Game ===
Kim starts her internship for CTU during the time of Vice President Prescott's assassination. However, Tony Almeida and Michelle Dessler are reluctant to take her in due to the day's events. Instead, CTU analyst Sean Walker welcomes her with open arms, having her work in the tech wing. Tony and Michelle's bad feelings however come true when Peter Madsen and a large number of thugs take over CTU while the other field agents are pre-occupied with the false nerve gas attacks. Michelle escorts Kim to room M3, which serves as a panic room during the event of a hostile take-over. Michelle succeeds in bringing Kim to the designated area, but is captured herself. After Jack and Tony arrive back at CTU's perimeter, Tony tells Kim to encrypt the data files on the undercover CTU agents, though Jack objects. Tony guides Kim through evading the guards and how to encrypt the files.

Her efforts however, are in vain since it results in Sean being killed. In order to prevent Michelle from dying, Kim turns herself in, planting a tracking device on the hard drive and another tracking device on herself. Madsen and Sin-Chung take Kim hostage when CTU tactical teams storm the building to regain their base. After Jack destroys Madsen and Sin-Chung's helicopter, Madsen uses Kim as his human shield, preventing the agent from doing his job. Sin-Chung's plan B is called in, and the driver extracting them is none other than undercover C.T.U. operative Chase Edmunds. Kim is eventually taken to the abandoned water facility in Burbank being used as Madsen's bargaining chip. During the time of her capture, Madsen gives subtle hints to Jack that Chase likes her. While Jack focuses on finding Kim, Chase at one point breaks his cover and tells Kim to warn CTU. Kim has difficulty in trusting Chase, but Chase's concern is genuine telling her the model of a technological item stolen from a laboratory. Under the guise of "having to use the bathroom" with Chase covering for her, Kim sneaks away and sends the call to CTU therefore exposing Madsen's plan to create artificial earthquakes.

An hour after the call, Jack rescues Kim and tells Chase to stay undercover to recover the hard-drive. Jack and Kim blast their way out of Madsen's base and eventually drive back to CTU. During Jack's confrontation with Ryan Chappelle, Kim disappears during the rest of the day staying in Jack's office in order to keep her safe from further harm.

=== 24: Season 3 ===
Kim has obtained a GED and an A.A. in computer science, and is working for CTU. Unbeknown to Jack, she is dating Chase Edmunds, another CTU agent who is partnered with Jack. Despite concerns from one of her colleagues that she was only granted the job due to her father's position as Director, Kim proves her skills and worth. During day 3, Kim tells Jack about her relationship with Chase and later discovers that he has a daughter, Angela. When her mother's killer, Nina Myers, escapes custody and begins a killing spree to break out of CTU, Kim pursues and corners her with a handgun, threatening to kill her if she does not surrender. Nina attempts to shoot Kim but Jack kills her before she can. Kim is eventually brought into the field, as Jane Saunder's double. When her identity is discovered and she is attacked, she is forced to shoot and kill her assailant. Chase ends the series being wheeled into surgery for an operation to re-attach his severed hand; Kim chooses a life with him, and is mentioned to be living with him in Valencia, California, and helping raise his daughter during the events of Day 4.

=== 24: Season 5 ===
After Jack's "death", Chase leaves Kim. She is reunited with Jack after arriving at CTU with Barry Landes, a clinical psychologist. She is romantically involved with Landes, whom Jack instantly dislikes, believing he, being much older, is taking advantage of Kim in her troubled mental state. She survives a Sentox nerve gas attack at CTU and is locked inside the situation room. She initially resents her father for not "trusting her enough" to let her know he was still alive, but Chloe O'Brian tells Kim that of the four people who did know Jack had faked his death, all had been targeted for assassination that very morning; two were now dead and one critically injured.

After the threat of the nerve gas is eliminated Kim leaves CTU, telling her father that though she still loves him, she cannot deal with the fact that every time she is near him, she is surrounded by death and disaster. Barry, after thanking Jack for saving their lives, is simply told by Jack to get Kim out of Los Angeles and not to stop for anything. Jack and Kim have no further contact during Day 5, although the Chinese fake a call from Kim as a ruse to kidnap Jack at the end of the day.

=== 24: Season 7 ===
Kim appeared towards the end of the seventh season. She makes her first appearance with Jack at the FBI in episode 18 of the season. Kim was brought there by Renee Walker and it was revealed that she had been trying to reach Jack all day and track him down for some time, but his constant moving made it impossible. Jack apologizes to her for causing her so much pain, and Kim apologizes to her father for pushing him away, and admitted that what she said to him the last time they talked was "stupid and immature" of her. Kim wants to donate stem cells in an attempt to save Jack's life from the effects of his exposure to the bio-weapon, but Jack refuses to put her at risk for his own life, and asks her to leave.

After leaving the FBI, she is seen talking with her husband Stephen who asks her if she told Jack about his granddaughter, Stephen and Kim's daughter, Teri. She answers negatively, explaining that she didn't want to cause Jack any more unnecessary pain. While waiting on a delayed flight, Kim notices a man she thinks is watching her. She asks a couple to check if the man is actually watching her, and they tell her he is not. It turns out the man watching her is an FBI agent sent by Jack Bauer to make sure Kim leaves D.C. safely. The man from the couple Kim is sitting with kills the FBI agent in the airport bathroom and takes his gun. He then uses his computer to show a live video feed of Kim which is then used as leverage to make Jack break Tony out of FBI custody.

Kim then receives a call from Agent Walker telling her of the terrorists sitting next to her. When the terrorists see the airport security coming, they take Kim hostage and start firing at the security and civilians alike. Kim stabs the person holding her in the leg with a pen and her captor gets shot. Kim then follows the other terrorist down the stairs. As she follows him, she meets up with two airport police, and they are suddenly ambushed. One of the Police is shot, but the other, although wounded, is able to shoot the terrorist in the throat, and his car crashes into a toll booth. Kim attempts to take the computer out of the car, but the terrorist uses his last reserve of strength to pull her arm into a fire. She escapes with the computer, but with a large burn on her right arm.

Reunited with the FBI, Kim gives the laptop to Renee and tells her to track the signal for where Tony is hiding. They are able to apprehend Tony moments before letting off a bomb placed on captive Bauer in an attempt to kill Alan Wilson, his pregnant wife's murderer.

As Jack slowly falls into a morphine induced coma, Kim arrives at the hospital and tells the doctors that she wants to donate stem cells to try to save her dying father. Season 7 ends with her telling Jack, "I'm sorry Daddy, but I'm not ready to let you go."

=== 24: Season 8 ===
At the beginning of Season 8, Kim is staying in New York. Jack comes over frequently and visits with his granddaughter, Teri. Jack plans to move with Kim back to L.A. Once the day's events start, Kim encourages him to help CTU. Jack is reluctant to return to his old kind of life, but Kim tells him that she knows he couldn't live with himself if something happened he could have helped stop. Kim tells Jack to be careful as he heads back inside CTU.

=== 24: Live Another Day ===
In the opening episode of 24: Live Another Day, Jack is being interrogated by the CIA. In exchange for information, they tell him they will arrange for him to see Kim, who has given birth to her second child - a son who remains nameless.
