= 12:00 a.m. – 1:00 a.m. =

- 24 episode
- Mandy (Mia Kirshner), a freelance terrorist, moments before exploding a 747. This scene, broadcast two months after the September 11 attacks, delayed the airing of the 24 pilot. This scene was also edited for sensitive content.
- Episode no.: Season 1 Episode 1
- Directed by: Stephen Hopkins
- Written by: Robert Cochran; Joel Surnow
- Cinematography by: Peter Levy
- Production code: 1AFF79
- Original air date: November 6, 2001
- Running time: 43 minutes

Guest appearances
- Mia Kirshner as Mandy; Carlos Bernard as Tony Almeida; Penny Johnson Jerald as Sherry Palmer; Michael O'Neill as Richard Walsh; Xander Berkeley as George Mason; Rudolf Martin as Martin Belkin; Richard Burgi as Alan York; Daniel Bess as Rick Allen; Matthew Carey as Dan Mounts; Jacqui Maxwell as Janet York; Tanya Wright as Patty Brooks; Karina Arroyave as Jamey Farrell; Devika Parikh as Maureen Kingsley

Episode chronology
← Previous —	Next → "1:00 a.m. – 2:00 a.m"
- 24 season 1

"12:00 a.m. – 1:00 a.m." (retroactively referred to as "Day 1: 12:00 a.m. – 1:00 a.m.") is the pilot episode and the first episode of the first season of the American action drama television series 24. It was written by series creators Joel Surnow and Robert Cochran and directed by Stephen Hopkins and originally aired in the United States on Fox at 9:00 p.m. on Tuesday, November 6, 2001.

The episode takes place between midnight and 1:00 a.m. on the day of the California Presidential Primary. It chronicles one hour in the day of Jack Bauer, a government agent called into work at the Counter Terrorist Unit, his daughter Kim who has snuck out of the house, his wife Teri who goes out searching for Kim, and Senator David Palmer who is seeking to become the first African-American President of the United States. CTU believes that David Palmer is being targeted for assassination.

The 24 pilot was originally scheduled to air on October 30, 2001, but was preempted due to the September 11 attacks. A quick scene of an explosion was also cut from the episode after the attacks. It was met with very positive critical reception. Joel Surnow and Robert Cochran received the Primetime Emmy Award for Outstanding Writing for a Drama Series for this episode.

== Plot ==
The pilot episode intercuts five different storylines, all occurring simultaneously in real-time. It takes place between Midnight and 1:00 a.m. in Los Angeles on Super Tuesday.

Jack Bauer is trying to repair his relationship with his wife, Teri (from whom he was briefly separated) and his teenage daughter Kim, who blames Teri for their separation. Just as Teri and Jack realize that Kim has snuck out of the house, Jack gets a call from colleague Nina Myers, who informs him of an emergency briefing at the Counter Terrorist Unit. Jack reluctantly leaves his worried wife and heads to CTU. Richard Walsh, Jack's mentor, informs the staff that the CTU has a tip that African American presidential candidate David Palmer is a primary target for assassination. Walsh takes Jack aside for a private conversation, asking him to help identify a potential mole in the CTU. "Trust no one," he tells Jack.

Teri Bauer receives a call from a man named Alan York, the father of Kim's schoolmate Janet York, who reveals that his daughter has also run away. Teri and Alan decide to go looking for Kim and Janet by themselves after Jack uses CTU resources to hack Kim's computer. Alan picks up Teri in his car, and they search through the city of Los Angeles.

Kim Bauer and her friend Janet meet with a couple of boys, Dan and Rick, at the empty furniture store where Dan works. Kim and Rick engage in playful flirting and connect over shared experiences, while Janet and Dan get high and have sex in one of the show beds. After the two boys refuse to drive Kim home and instead force her to accompany them and Janet to a party, Kim begins to feel uneasy about her situation.

Senator David Palmer is preparing for a 7 AM victory speech when he gets a call from a journalist named Maureen Kingsley. His wife, Sherry, overhears him lose his temper and mention an "allegation". When Sherry asks what the journalist said, David halfheartedly assuages her and walks out onto his hotel balcony alone to look out over the city.

In a 747 flying towards Los Angeles, photographer Martin Belkin has sex with a lustful woman named Mandy in the bathroom of the airplane. After they finish, Martin ignores her and returns to his seat, having already told Mandy that he is set to photograph Palmer at his speech. Briefly falling asleep, Martin finds his wallet missing; Mandy has stolen it.

Removing an ID card for the event with Martin's picture on it from the wallet, Mandy subdues the flight attendant, removes a hidden bomb which she then rigs to explode, and puts on a flight suit and parachute concealed in her luggage. She parachutes out after blowing a rear door open. Seconds later, her bomb explodes, killing everyone on the plane. (A shot of the 747 exploding in mid-air was edited out of the episode, in light of the September 11 attacks which had occurred just two months before.)

Back at the CTU, Jack blackmails CTU Regional Director George Mason with evidence of embezzlement from seized terrorist assets to obtain the name of Mason's source for the tip about Palmer's assassination. He is about to leave to find Kim when the plane explosion is reported; reluctantly, he stays behind and orders a new investigation into the bombing. Teri and Alan unknowingly pass by the van carrying Kim and Janet as they continue their search.

== Production ==
=== Casting ===
When Kiefer Sutherland took the project, he did not understand that the series was set in real-time, having skipped the line that said, "All events take place in real time." Kiefer said it was, in fact, the interaction between the characters that prompted him to accept the pilot. Sutherland was sent the script by director Stephen Hopkins, with whom he had a previous relationship. Sutherland was attracted to the "shades of grey" in the Jack Bauer character, as well as his status as a "normal guy", citing Jack's inability to handle his own teenage daughter.

The Tony Almeida character was originally called "Geller" in the original script, who Bernard called a "backbiting Jewish techie guy". Bernard didn't understand why they had sent him the script, given his Hispanic ethnicity. Carlos and the crew came up with the Tony Almeida name fifteen minutes before shooting, but the legal department wouldn't let them use it and insisted instead on the name 'Tonio', which Carlos found underwhelming. Bernard said, "So we were filming the very first scene, Kiefer walking down CTU, and he turns to me and says, 'Sorry man, I can't call you Tonio, I'm just gonna call you Tony.' I owe Kiefer everything: Tonio's the name of a guy who gets killed in the first episode."

=== Filming ===
The episode had a $4 million budget with filming in March 2001, mostly done in an old Chatsworth pencil factory. The set of CTU was initially done in a Fox Sports office, with the set reproduced once the series was picked up for the season. The series was supposed to be filmed in Toronto, but due to the variability of Canadian weather, Los Angeles was chosen as a filming location. Director Stephen Hopkins referred to the Los Angeles as presented in the first season as "an unfinished western mining town, a city of one-story warehouses and dirty and dusty". Handheld cameras were used to make the series look less glamorous and to create the feeling that the viewer was in the scene. Lights were used sparingly so as to keep the actors from looking too visually pleasing. Hopkins referred to certain scenes as being shot like "live theatre". The camera was never placed outside the fourth wall or where a person could not be, to keep the viewer "within the room", used notably during the scene where Mandy has sex with Martin Belkin in the bathroom of the plane. Hopkins said he was wary of the real-time element, as the few real-time films that had tried it "didn't work that well".

=== Editing ===
The use of splitscreens were created in response to the amount of phone calls in the first episode, with Hopkins using it as a way to show the viewer where to pay attention. Editor David Thompson said, "Splitscreens are great, boxes are even cooler" and began editing in asymmetrical boxes to the Pilot episode. The "boxes" were first used as a necessity during the scene where Jack calls Kim's ex-boyfriend, Vincent. Surnow explained, "It became an artistic element. [..] It made sense in the story we were telling." Joel Surnow came up with the idea for the onscreen ticking clock. "Jack's Theme" was the first theme that Sean Callery wrote for the series with having only read the script. Callery received the 24th cut of the 24 pilot on April 24, 2001, which was the final cut of the episode. The first cut of the Pilot episode was not received well by test groups, prompting the editors to move scenes, including moving the introduction of the David Palmer character closer to the beginning.

== Reception ==
=== Critical reception ===
The series premiere won outstandingly positive reviews from the television critical community. The premiere episode was cited by The New York Times as a "Critic's Pick" by Caryn James, who noted that it was "a drama sleek, suspenseful and absorbing enough to overcome its blatant gimmick". She added that of the 2001 fall season's new government series that "24 is the most daring and promising" and that "Mr. Sutherland is an unexpectedly sympathetic hero". Ain't It Cool News gave the premiere episode five stars, saying it features "Loads of edgy, complex, compelling characters. Intricate, unpredictable plotting. Lightning-like pacing. A stellar cast. A near-constant, electric undercurrent of sex. It keeps asking questions you’ll be dying to see answered. And, perhaps best of all, it feels like no TV show you’ve ever seen."

Time magazine praised the series, saying "Forget sleeping through this one--you won't even want to blink. 24 is the most distinctive, addictive new TV series this season. As an old-fashioned thriller, it's relentless, tense and deliciously paranoiac, with more twists than a Twizzler. But it's also boldly different. Most notably, there's its clever visual signature: picture-in-picture screens that show two, three and even four different scenes simultaneously." Time also noted that "The show takes to the next level the trend of serial story 'arcs', which began with '80s dramas like Hill Street Blues and Wiseguy and which continues on The West Wing and The Sopranos." Time also praised the performances of Kiefer Sutherland and Dennis Haysbert, saying that "It helps that there's a strong cast driving the train. Haysbert is commanding, if a tad underutilized in the pilot, as an idealist with a dangerous secret. And Sutherland plays the gravel-voiced Bauer with an assurance that belies his teen-movie-star past; his overstressed agent is stalwart but weary, a haunted spook."

TV Barn called the first episode "not to be missed", adding that "Although there really are only two main story lines, each episode has no fewer than six stories to keep track of, full of suspense and action-packed (without seeming like a big-bang action movie). There's a lot going on in 24, but you have to pay attention to truly appreciate it. I predict 24 will have a lot of viewers' undivided attention this fall."

=== Awards ===
Joel Surnow and Robert Cochran won the Outstanding Writing in a Drama Series award at the 54th Primetime Emmy Awards. Stephen Hopkins was also nominated for Outstanding Directing in a Drama Series for his directorial work on this episode. Hopkins was also nominated for a Directors Guild of America Award for Outstanding Directing – Drama Series at the Directors Guild of America Awards 2001.
