= President Palmer =

President Palmer may refer to either of two characters in the television series 24 who have held the office of President of the United States:

- David Palmer, who was running for election in season 1 and is President in seasons 2–3. He was a recurring character in seasons 4 and 5
- Wayne Palmer, David Palmer's brother. Acted as President's Chief of Staff during season 3. He reappeared in season 5 as a recurring character and was a major character again as President in Season 6
