= Tony Almeida =

Fictional character

- 24 character
- Carlos Bernard as Tony Almeida
- First appearance: Day 1 – Episode 1
- Last appearance: Legacy – Episode 12
- Created by: Joel Surnow; Robert Cochran
- Portrayed by: Carlos Bernard
- Days: 1, 2, 3, 4, 5, 7
- Other Appearances: 24: The Game; 24: Solitary; 24: Legacy

In-universe information
- Spouse: Michelle Dessler
- Significant others: Nina Myers; Cara Bowden; Rebecca Ingram; Sidra

Anthony "Tony" Almeida is a fictional character portrayed by Carlos Bernard on the television series 24. Almeida appeared in a total of 126 episodes (including 24: Legacy), the second highest number of episodes of any character in the series, behind Jack Bauer (192, played by Kiefer Sutherland) and just ahead of Chloe O'Brian (125, played by Mary Lynn Rajskub). Despite initially having friction with Jack Bauer, he eventually develops a strong friendship with Jack and becomes one of the few people Jack trusts unconditionally with his life. However, the loss of his wife Michelle Dessler and unborn son at the hands of a government conspiracy drives him into despair and then rage. His descent into darkness and evil to seek revenge against those responsible for destroying his life is widely lamented by fans and showcases a dark contrast to Jack whose life has also been ruined by the government.

== Characterization ==
Tony Almeida was born in Chicago, Illinois, in 1972 to an Italian mother and Portuguese father. He has a Bachelor of Science degree in computer science and engineering from San Diego State University and a Master of Science degree in computer science from Stanford University. He served in the United States Marine Corps and attended Scout Sniper and Surveillance and Target Acquisition training. He was honorably discharged as a first lieutenant and worked as a systems analyst before being hired by CTU. He was previously on more episodes than any other character, second to Jack Bauer, but was surpassed by Chloe O'Brien.

== Appearances ==
=== 24: Day 1 ===
Tony Almeida is a systems analyst and third-in-command at the Counter Terrorist Unit's Los Angeles headquarters, and is romantically involved with fellow agent Nina Myers. Tony consequently has animosity towards the series' protagonist, Jack Bauer, who was formerly in a relationship with Nina.

Just after midnight, word arrives of an imminent assassination attempt on Democratic presidential candidate David Palmer. When Jack is forced to cease contact with CTU, Tony and Division become suspicious and place CTU under lockdown while George Mason interrogates key staff members. Tony's suspicions are aroused further when Jack returns and sneaks Nina out of headquarters at gunpoint. Shortly thereafter, Tony and Nina interrogate Jamey Farrell, leading her to confess to her involvement with Ira Gaines, the terrorist behind the kidnapping of Jack's wife and daughter. Jamey dies in an apparent suicide soon after this.

After Jack succeeds in rescuing Kim and Teri Bauer, both Alberta Green and Ryan Chappelle encourage Tony to report Jack for unnecessarily endangering Senator Palmer. However, Tony refuses. Kim and Teri flee from a CTU safe house when it is attacked by hitmen working for Gaines' employers, Andre and Alexis Drazen. After a confrontation by Nina, Tony visits Jack's home and saves both Teri and Phil Parslow from being killed by Jovan Myovic.

Before the day's end, Palmer is saved and the Drazens are killed. However, Nina is revealed to be a second mole working for the Drazens, having killed Jamey and staged Jamey's suicide when Jamey exposed her (Nina). Jack realizes this by viewing security tapes which show Jamey's murder. Nina is captured, though not before she kills several people while attempting to escape, including Teri. When Jack points the gun at Nina for her betrayal, Tony and George dissuade Jack from pulling the trigger. Tony can only watch in disgust and disbelief as the woman he thought he loved is led away.

=== 24: Day 2 ===
Tony becomes the new chief of staff and Mason's second-in-command at CTU, and is present when Jack returns to the agency to assist in hunting down Second Wave, a Middle Eastern terrorist organization that plots to detonate a nuclear weapon in Los Angeles. When Kate Warner reports Reza Nayieer to CTU, Tony questions Reza and the Warner family. Though financial records link Reza to the leader of Second Wave, Syed Ali, Reza denies any involvement with terrorists. It is later revealed that Reza is indeed innocent and that his fiancée, Marie Warner, was the one collaborating with Ali.

Near the beginning of the second season, Mason was exposed to lethal dose of plutonium, leaving him with radiation sickness. Mason eventually passes along the leadership of CTU to Tony, and leaves the agency. One hour later, in a noble effort to remove the nuclear bomb from a populated area, Mason crashes a plane carrying the bomb into the Nevada desert, sacrificing his own life as it detonates. Under Tony's command, CTU receives recordings of a meeting between Ali and representatives from three Middle Eastern countries at Cyprus.

Jack learns from Jonathan Wallace that the Cyprus recordings were false. After learning the truth himself, Tony, along with Michelle Dessler, begin covertly assisting Jack, and are eventually forced to physically incapacitate Chappelle. After Chappelle is found by Carrie, he orders their arrest. However, when Mike Novick orders Chappelle to assist Jack, Tony and Michelle, they are given immunity and reinstated. With Tony and Michelle's assistance, Jack and Sherry Palmer, the president's ex-wife, are able to get a recording implicating Peter Kingsley, the true manipulator of the day's events, and prevent a war with the Middle East.

Throughout the day, Tony and Michelle begin to realize that they share a mutual attraction. At first, Tony keeps his distance out of hesitancy after what happened with Nina. After receiving parting advice from Mason, however, Michelle expresses an interest. The two become romantically involved and later marry.

=== 24: The Game ===
While Jack Bauer is often pre-occupied with other tasks such as leads to save his daughter or find more information about the terrorist threats, Tony has been out in the field as extensively as both Jack and Chase Edmunds. Throughout the day, Tony apprehended Joseph Sin-Chung, who was currently posing as a crew member of the apprehended cargo boat named Lee Jin-Yu. He prevented a terrorist threat at a metro station prior to the capture of CTU. During the hour that CTU was held hostage, Tony guides Kim Bauer to encrypt the hard-drive containing the data of the undercover CTU agents, significantly slowing down the terrorists' progress in getting the information.

Shortly after Kim's return to CTU, Tony leads one of the tactical teams disarming one of the bombs at a construction site situated along a fault line. Hours after the threat, Tony had to rush to the scene of a crime, which involved a hostage situation with Governor James Radford. After restraining as many confused gunmen as he could, he had to negotiate with the leader, who was merely a desperate man trying to save his sick son. Tony succeeds in calming down the gunman, but the gunman is found dead by the time Tony busts open the locked door. He started becoming suspicious of Radford as he checks the gunman's body. Tony's suspicions came true when an assistant of Governor Radford calls telling him to meet her at Fisher Pier, which was happening approximately at the same time as Chase Edmunds's return to C.T.U.

Tony met up with the assistant and was given a keycard to Radford's office, with the assistant suspecting that Radford was involved in terrorist activity. The suspicion came true as a helicopter ambushed the pair, killing the assistant. Tony barely escapes with his life and drives off to the Governor's office building. After dealing with various gunmen under Radford's payroll and rescuing any trapped civilians, Tony found evidence that showed Radford's involvement with the terrorists. It turned out that Radford was seen conversing with Peter Madsen, Joseph Sin-Chung, and an unknown third man. Tony attempts to track Radford and manages to eavesdrop on Radford's conversation with the unknown man. Radford attempted to walk out, but the assassin Mandy already kills Radford before Tony could do anything. Tony's evidence proved invaluable since CTU was later able to identify the third man as Max.

While Jack and Chase were busy at Fort Lesker, Tony, Michelle, and Chappelle have information that Kate Warner is still alive, but Chappelle restricted Tony from notifying Jack under the guise of completing the established mission. A few hours later, the trace was complete being located at Max's yacht. After berating Chappelle out of disgust, Tony heads back out to the field one more time to assist Jack and Chase at the L.A. Docks in a CTU helicopter. Tony picks up Chase first, and pilots the chopper to have Chase provide support fire for Jack before picking him up.

Tony maneuvers the helicopter around the yacht allowing Chase to mow down gunmen firing at them, while Jack abseils onto the deck of the yacht. As the day ends, Tony stays on the yacht with Kate to clean up the mess while Chase pilots the helicopter with a wounded Jack to a nearby hospital.

=== 24: Day 3 ===
Tony fields promotion offers from several CTU regional divisions. Despite this, he, Jack Bauer and Gael Ortega organize a covert sting operation designed to keep the deadly Cordilla virus out of the hands of the Salazars, a Mexican crime family. During the operation, Tony is shot in the neck in a shopping mall and incapacitated, leaving him comatose. After awakening, Tony returns to his CTU post to resume the operation. Tension mounts between Tony and Michelle over his health and his secrecy towards her. Michelle is later trapped inside a hotel as it becomes infected with the virus, and asks Tony to authorize the use of suicide capsules to the infected patrons.

Against Jack's explicit wishes, Tony uses Kim in a field operation as a replacement for Jane Saunders, the daughter of rogue MI6 agent Stephen Saunders, in an attempt to secure collateral against him. Just as the FBI prepares to corner Saunders, he reveals that he has captured Michelle and will kill her unless Tony aids his escape. Tony acquiesces, allowing Saunders to evade the FBI and free Jane from CTU custody. Jack realizes Tony's motives, and convinces him to work with CTU on a sting. At the arranged meeting, CTU intervenes and captures Saunders. However, Tony is arrested for treason.

=== 24: Day 4 ===
Tony enters the story once again by rescuing Jack and Audrey from armed hostiles at a security firm. It is afterwards revealed that Almeida was sent to prison for treason, but was released early when Jack secured a pardon from President Palmer. Michelle had left Tony due to his alcoholism and depression, leading him to move in with a woman named Jen Slater. There, Tony harbors Jack and Audrey Raines.

Tony considers the rescue a repayment of the debt he owes Jack for getting him out of prison and initially does not wish to be involved in the case any further. Jack respects Tony's wishes, but when setting out from Tony's house to apprehend a suspect on his own, Tony reasons that it would be stupid to let his friend go back out alone after saving his life and offers to help. This leads him to become further involved in the day's events, eventually returning to CTU on a provisional basis.

Tensions rise when the Associate Special Agent in Charge of Division Bill Buchanan and Tony's former wife, Michelle Dessler, take active command of CTU Los Angeles when incumbent Special Agent in Charge Erin Driscoll leaves for personal reasons.

Tony and Michelle clash at first, but gradually the two begin to realize they still have feelings for each other. Near the end of the day, they have agreed to leave CTU together and start a new life once the current threat is dealt with.

An assassin named Mandy who had made an attempt on President David Palmer's life in Season Two, becomes the next lead and Bill Buchanan calls Tony into the field to help apprehend her. Tony is captured and Mandy uses him to coerce Michelle into providing her with an escape route, just as Saunders did to Tony in Season Three. Michelle is about to comply, but decides to tell Bill instead. Mandy attempts to fake her own and Tony's death in a car bomb in order to escape. While being walked out of the building at gunpoint by her, Tony attempts to overcome Mandy, but eventually is rescued by Jack and Curtis, who have, by this point, seen through the ploy.

At the end of Day 4, when Walt Cummings, an overzealous member of the new Logan Administration, decides that Jack Bauer needs to die due to his part in an illegal raid on the Chinese Consulate in Los Angeles, Tony plays an integral part in faking Jack's death. After smuggling him out of CTU, Tony allows himself to have an emotional good-bye to his friend, before he and Michelle drive off to begin their new life.

=== 24: Day 5 ===
By Day 5, Tony and Michelle have left CTU and are living life together as civilians. After receiving news that Palmer has been assassinated, Michelle wants to go into CTU and assist in the investigation. Tony tries to dissuade her but she leaves without him and triggers a bomb planted under her car. Tony rushes from the house to see what has happened to his wife, but as he finds her body, the car's fuel tank explodes, critically injuring him. It is later confirmed through CTU conversations that Michelle is dead.

Tony is transported to CTU Medical, where he undergoes surgery and is stabilized. Later, an assassin infiltrates CTU, impersonates a doctor and lures Jack down to medical by claiming Tony has awoken. Jack manages to foil the attempt on his life. Upon actually waking a few hours later, Tony is not aware that Michelle has died. Having been advised by the doctor that Tony should be kept calm, Bill Buchanan tells him that Michelle's condition is still unknown. However, Tony suspects otherwise and escapes CTU Medical to access a computer, where he learns of his wife's fate. Bill later informs him that CTU have discovered Christopher Henderson to be involved in the murder.

Tony ends up sealed inside CTU Medical along with Henderson when terrorists release Sentox nerve gas into the building, killing many members of the staff. Enraged and feeling he has nothing left to live for, Tony decides to kill Henderson by injecting him a lethal dose of hyoscine-pentothal while he is seemingly in a coma. Jack's attempts to dissuade him eventually cause Tony to hesitate, however, and Henderson is given time to disarm Tony of the syringe and inject him with it before escaping. Before Jack can get him medical help, Tony apparently dies.

=== 24: Day 7 ===
Tony is discovered to be alive and currently working with a terrorist group to disrupt US President Allison Taylor's invasion of Sangala by blackmailing her with terrorist attacks. It is ultimately revealed that Christopher Henderson purposely missed Tony's heart when he stabbed him, and planned on turning him. He had his people take Tony's body, and they were able to revive him within 10 minutes of his apparent death. Jack Bauer and the FBI apprehend Tony. Jack requests to interrogate Tony, but fails to get him to talk. However, during the interrogation, Tony taunts Jack into attacking him and while they fight, Tony is able to discreetly give Jack the code word 'Deep Sky'. Jack recognizes this as an old CTU code for a phone number, which he calls once he is in private. The number leads him to Bill Buchanan and Chloe O'Brian who reveal that Tony was working undercover for them to uncover corrupt US officials working with General Benjamin Juma, the dictator of Sangala and perpetrator of mass genocide. Furthermore, Tony needs to be freed so he can continue his work. Jack breaks Tony out of FBI custody and joins him, Bill and Chloe in resuming their independent operation, which culminates in the elimination of the terrorist group, the unmasking of Juma's allies in the U.S. government, and the deaths of General Juma and his squad of soldiers who storm the White House.

Following the end of the White House siege, Jack and Tony scramble to intercept and then recover a shipment of bioweapons engineered by Jonas Hodges, president of mercenary corporation Starkwood, who intends to blackmail the President and enact Executive legislation benefitting himself. Aided by the FBI, Jack and Tony successfully destroy the chemical weapons in the Starkwood compound, although Jack is exposed to the bio-weapon and infected.

Following the destruction of the weapons, it is revealed that Tony is actually working with the terrorists. He murders FBI Agent Larry Moss and recovers the one remaining canister of the chemical weapon, which he gives to Cara Bowden, a representative of the conspirators, all of whom had planned the day's events and of whom Hodges was previously a member. Tony and the conspirators initiate their operation and attempt to detonate the canister inside the DC Metro tunnels. They are stopped by Jack and the FBI, who apprehend Tony and recover the canister before it can detonate. As they transport Tony to the FBI, Cara contacts Jack and through threats to his daughter Kim Bauer, forces him to help Tony escape custody. Jack hands Tony over to Cara, and they then take Jack hostage to salvage the remains of the virus from Jack's infected blood, tissue and organs. Finally alone with Tony, Jack tries to reason with the man who was once his closest friend. Tony reveals that his true goal was always to get close enough to Alan Wilson, the head conspirator behind the day's attacks and the man responsible for the murders of David Palmer and Michelle Dessler. Tony's actions have convinced Wilson that he could be allowed further into the conspiracy circle and sets up a rare meeting, at which Tony plans to turn on him.

Wilson arrives to speak with Tony, but the group is ambushed by the FBI. Retreating into a warehouse, Tony kills Cara and corners Wilson. As Tony prepares to kill him, he reveals that not only did Wilson kill Michelle, but he also killed their unborn son. Jack and Renee arrive, disabling Tony before he has the chance to carry out his revenge. Tony is led away into FBI custody once again, cursing and raging at Jack.

=== 24: Solitary ===
In the seven-minute special feature exclusive to the Live Another Day Blu-ray set, 24: Solitary, Tony requests to be moved to general population, approximately 8 years after Day 7, so that he can serve as an undercover “inside source” and provide actionable Intel about other prisoners. He states that his desire for revenge consumed him and that Michelle “never would’ve approved of the man I became” following her death. He accepts the fact that he’s going to die in prison, but hopes to save at least one life so that he can be worthy of Michelle’s love again. When the Prison Administrator denies Tony's case due to U.S. Attorney Vanessa Diaz's (who opposes any reduction in Tony's security) evidence, Tony violently attacks her. After Tony is taken out of the room, it is revealed that the attack was a ruse so that Diaz could pass off her glasses to Tony. Vanessa calls her contact on a secure line and informs him that Tony has the plans. Tony puts the glasses on and presses a hidden button on the side of the frame, which reveals a schematic to the prison with a carefully planned escape route on the lenses. He is confident that everything is going according to plan and that, soon, he will be a free man again.

=== 24: Legacy ===
Tony Almeida returns in the 24 spin-off, 24: Legacy, having escaped from prison and become a mercenary. When Henry Donovan withholds information about his dealings with terrorists and CTU is unable to break him, Rebecca Ingram hires Almeida to provide enhanced interrogation. Almeida is later paid to kill Ara Naseri by Donald Simms and comes into conflict with Eric Carter. Almeida refuses to stand down and loses most of his team to Carter. Almeida gets a call from John Donovan revealing the identity of Naseri and the fact that Naseri is their best chance to save Rebecca. Almeida stands down and tells Carter to save Rebecca.
