= 24: The Game =

Third-person shooter video game

- European box art featuring the main cast (clockwise from top left): Jack Bauer, Tony Almeida, Michelle Dessler, Kim Bauer, and David Palmer.
- Developer: SCEE Cambridge Studio
- Publishers: EU: Sony Computer Entertainment; NA: 2K
- Designer: Katie Sorrell
- Artist: Rob Hill
- Writer: Duppy Demetrius
- Composer: Sean Callery
- Platform: PlayStation 2
- Release: NA: February 28, 2006; EU: March 17, 2006; AU: April 22, 2006
- Genre: Third-person shooter
- Mode: Single-player

24: The Game is a 2006 third-person shooter video game developed by SCEE Cambridge Studio and published by Sony Computer Entertainment for the PlayStation 2. It is based on the Fox television series 24. 2K released the game in North America. The player controls many characters from the television series at different points in the game. The musical score was composed by Sean Callery, while the script was written by Duppy Demetrius and the series production team.

24: The Game makes extensive use of actors' voices and likenesses from the TV series, as well as using a script and music score from the same production team. Casting and voice production for 24: The Game were organized and handled by Blindlight. The events contained in the game are set in Los Angeles between the second and third seasons of the show. The story features three plotlines that overlap around a character from Jack Bauer's past named Peter Madsen. Although the game received a mixed reception from critics, it received a BAFTA nomination for its screenplay elements.

== Gameplay ==
Like the series, the game takes place over 24 hours and has the same start and end clocks for each hour, marking the start and end of each part of the game. The hours are broken down into 58 separate missions, of which there are three broad types, each described in further detail below. Some missions are objective-based, while others have a time-restricted element. Each mission is graded out of 100 points, based on the quality of performance, number of objectives completed, shooting accuracy and so on. A grade of 90 points or higher rewards the player by unlocking some form of bonus feature, including three movies (interviews with cast about the game, TV promos), 98 images (wallpaper-like images of main characters) and 23 characters (3D models that the player can view).

Most of the game's missions take place in third-person shooting format, combined with the use of a cover system. When a character is behind a low object like a crate, or at the edge of a corner or doorframe, they can press a button to use the object or edge as cover. Another button will allow the character to peer around and enter a targeting mode, while releasing the button will quickly return them to cover. There is also a stealth mode which has the character stoop, walk silently (unless running), duck behind any low obstacles they can hide behind and be less detectable by sound. A character can sneak up behind an enemy using stealth mode and perform a silent "stealth takedown" by breaking his neck.

A variety of weapons are available including handguns, automatic weapons and shotguns, with various ammunition types also in existence. Ammunition is limited in the game and weapons must be reloaded, although additional ammunition can be collected. Players can also call out to enemies who will sometimes surrender and can then be captured (put in handcuffs) with their ammunition also collected. There are also civilians in the game who can also be called out to and then rescued by the player. Health bars for enemies, vehicles or friendly subjects that must be protected are also sometimes shown. There are health packs that can be picked up, as well as health stations mounted on walls that can be used. Body armor is also sometimes provided or found in levels. A small heads-up-display features a radar/map with an arrow showing the character's direction, red dots for enemies, green dots for civilians, and yellow stars for objectives. The direction and field of vision of enemies is shown on the radar.

In third-person missions and occasionally some other types, a PDA is available. In the PDA the player can view their list of objectives (which can change over the course of a mission), maps of the area if available, a help screen and a list of weapons held with information on each. Characters also typically have cell phones which they sometimes receive calls on during missions. Some missions involve sniping using first-person shooter gameplay. These missions resemble the use of a sniper rifle during normal missions but the player cannot switch to a third-person view.

There are several missions in which the player controls a motor vehicle. Though the game engine is the same as the third-person mode, these missions are based on being in a vehicle. They usually involve getting to a certain location in a certain time period, often while avoiding pursuers while heading to the end point. Weapons can not be used while in a vehicle. While the PDA is not available in these mission types, a map of the city is. Cell phone calls are also sometimes received in these missions.

=== Minigames ===
One of the interrogation mini games in progress, showing a suspect being broken

24's minigames serve as interludes from the main mission, and are primarily interrogation sequences or computer puzzles. They are presented both as single puzzles in third-person missions, and as timed stand-alone missions. The computer puzzles include maze puzzles, where a player must select a coloured path from a starting box to an ending box and sometimes a second and third box, are used to represent bypassing locks and other computer functions. Letter sequence puzzles, where a player swaps adjacent pairs of a series of random letters until they are in the correct sequence, are used to represent code-breaking such as for encrypted files or a locked door. Colour/symbol matching puzzles, where a cursor randomly moves across a field of coloured squares and the player must press the controller button that corresponds to that coloured square, are used to represent unscrambling files from hard drives and other similar functions. A number of other puzzles are used only once, including puzzles to simulate transferring files over a damaged network, infrared scanning of buildings, radar-like scanning of areas, and creating a network link across the entire planet.

The interrogation minigame involves the players character interrogating a suspect. A graph shows the suspect's "stress level" which oscillates in a sort of pseudo-sine wave. The player must choose to act either aggressively, calmingly or neutrally towards the suspect. These actions will raise, lower or maintain the stress level. A horizontal target range is highlighted on the chart, which the player must aim for the stress level to be within in order to advance the interrogation. A marker next to the graph indicates how advance the interrogation. The player must complete interrogation within a set time limit to succeed.

== Plot ==
24: The Game takes place between the events of the second and third seasons. In a similar way to the TV series, it can be split up into three sections or chapters. Section one revolves around an attack on Vice President Jim Prescott, while section two covers an attack on the Counter Terrorist Unit (CTU). Section three covers a major terrorist attack and attempt to gain access to nuclear weapons. A large number of characters from seasons two and three feature in 24: The Game, with each using the original actor's likeness and voice acting. Main characters returning include Jack Bauer, Kimberly "Kim" Bauer, Tony Almeida, Michelle Dessler, Chase Edmunds, David Palmer, Max, Kate Warner, Chloe O'Brian, and Ryan Chappelle, with Peter Madsen being voiced by Christian Kane.

The game begins with Jack Bauer waiting outside a ship in Los Angeles harbor where terrorists are going to release a ricin bomb in the water supply. A CTU team member triggers an alarm causing Jack and his team to storm the ship, discovering the whole ship's crew dead in a cargo hold. He later learns of an assassination attempt on Vice President Prescott through undercover agent Chase Edmunds. Foiling the attack, Jack discovers that the mastermind behind the attempt is an enemy from his past known as Peter Madsen.

A Sarin gas attack on an L.A. Metro station lures CTU agents away from their headquarters. While distracted, terrorists activate an EMP, attacking and taking over the CTU LA main building, holding the staff members hostage. The terrorists execute these hostages, including data analyst Sean Walker and eventually escape with a stolen hard drive. Jack runs into Peter Madsen, who has kidnapped Jack's daughter, Kim Bauer, forcing Jack to do "errands" for the terrorist cell. One of these errands is to sneak into a NSA building and retrieve confidential data for the terrorists. Jack manages to find and rescue Kim and recover the stolen hard drive with the help of undercover agent Chase Edmunds.

A major earthquake occurs in Los Angeles, caused by terrorists detonating explosives at focal points (places where fault lines intersect). Kate Warner is also kidnapped by the terrorist cell, along with Governor James Radford who is kidnapped for assassination but is then rescued by the CTU. A conspiracy involving Radford in the day's attacks is uncovered by the CTU and Radford is killed by the terrorist cell because he attempts to back out. Fort Lesker, U.S. Military base and the epicenter of the earthquakes, is attacked and taken over by terrorists, who then begin stealing weapons-grade plutonium before attempting to smuggle the weapons out of the U.S. to the Middle East. Kate Warner's father is forced to aid the terrorists by helping them smuggle the weapons with his customs passes. Jack finally kills Madsen when he tries to escape by shooting his speedboat with an M-80 assault rifle, causing it to explode. He also shoots and kills Max, the man behind the events of Season 2 and The Game, who was holding Kate Warner hostage, saving her life but in doing so Max manages to shoot Jack once in the stomach before dying. As a result, Chase Edmunds takes Jack to the hospital via helicopter.

== Characters ==
Voice actor	Character
Kiefer Sutherland	Jack Bauer
Elisha Cuthbert	Kim Bauer
Dennis Haysbert	David Palmer
Reiko Aylesworth	Michelle Dessler
Carlos Bernard	Tony Almeida
James Badge Dale	Chase Edmunds
Mary Lynn Rajskub	Chloe O'Brian
Zachary Quinto	Adam Kaufman
Glenn Morshower	Agent Aaron Pierce
Thomas Kretschmann	Max
Paul Schulze	Ryan Chappelle
Alan Dale	VP Jim Prescott
Daniel Dae Kim	Agent Tom Baker
Sarah Clarke	Nina Myers
Sarah Wynter	Kate Warner
Christian Kane	Peter Madsen
Andreas Katsulas	Governor Radford
Tom Sizemore	Sid Wilson

== Development ==
24: The Game was announced on March 30, 2005, by Sony Computer Entertainment Europe through a licensing deal with Twentieth Century Fox to bring 24 to the PlayStation 2, and Sony Computer Entertainment's Cambridge Studio was confirmed to be the developer of the game. The announcement described how the game would sit between seasons two and three of the TV series, answering many questions left unanswered by the TV show storyline. Also included was the news that the game would feature the voices and likenesses of many of the cast of the TV show. The music score had been prepared by Sean Callery, while a script had been created by Duppy Demetrius in collaboration with the 24 production team. Sean Callery, who composed the music for the television show, was announced to collaborating with Nimrod Productions to transfer the music of the show into the gameplay. The press release was accompanied by a press-only video featuring Kiefer Sutherland describing some of the story and gameplay elements.

The game made an appearance later that May at the E3 show in 2005, where four sections were demonstrated: a third-person shootout, an interrogation scene, a computer tech minigame and a driving sequence. Some of the intermediate cut-scenes were also shown at this point. The interrogation scene received praise, while the driving segment was let down by poor mechanics and physics. Originally 100 missions were proposed, with only 58 making it into the final game. In an interview, Mark Green stated that the game style was influenced by the way Lord of the Rings: The Two Towers and Enter the Matrix, while gameplay influences were described as James Bond 007: Everything or Nothing and Alias.

It was originally planned to be released worldwide in the northern fall of 2005 but was delayed. The game was released in North America on February 28, 2006 in Europe on March 17, 2006 (March 16, 2006 in Ireland, due to St. Patrick's Day), and in Australia on April 22, 2006. The musical score to the game, performed by the Nimrod Studio Orchestra and recorded at Abbey Road Studios in London, was made available for digital download after the game was released.

== Reception ==
Reception

Aggregate score
Aggregator	Score
Metacritic	62/100

Review scores
Publication	Score
Edge	6/10
Electronic Gaming Monthly	6.67/10
Eurogamer	6/10
Game Informer	7.5/10
GamePro	3/5
GameRevolution	C
GameSpot	6.2/10
GameSpy	2/5
GameTrailers	7.1/10
GameZone	6.5/10
IGN	4.2/10
Official U.S. PlayStation Magazine	4/5
The A.V. Club	C
Detroit Free Press	2/4

The game received "mixed or average" reviews, according to video game review aggregator Metacritic. The game was nominated for a BAFTA Games Award in the Best Screenplay category at 3rd British Academy Games Awards (2006), losing out to Psychonauts.

Eduardo Vasconcellos of GameSpy praised the game's storyline and high-quality voice work, but criticized the "jagged" visuals that caused character renderings to look "off". He also complained of the lack of responsiveness in the controls, the "disjointed and awkward" camera angles, and the slowness with which some enemies react to the player.

Items from the TV series such as multi-perspective screens (as shown on the box cover) were popular for illustrating multiple viewpoints of an objective. The use of episode start and end graphics to mark the start and end of missions was also liked. The script was generally described as being a redeeming feature of the game, although fans of the series may find that the viewpoints, motives and reasoning of the villains isn't covered well. Cutscenes were singled out for particular praise by IGN, highlighting good use of camera angles and tight focus. Voice acting was generally popular, although some lines suffered from poor direction or emphasis. In contrast, device and ambiance sounds were well received with gunfire getting a particular mention.

Gameplay mechanics were singled out as being particularly poor. The third-person shooter sections suffered from poor camera-angle management, making targeting enemies feel "awkward and disjointed". Enemy artificial intelligence for these sections was described as predictable and basic, adopting repeated firing stances or ignoring the character despite being shot repeatedly. Sniper variants of this fared better. The vehicle sections were also disappointing, with physics and vehicle handling being rated poorly. Vehicles were described as feeling "slow and clapped out", with pursuits described as being "boring". The use of AI in these sections were heavily criticized for being predictable and simplistic, with enemy vehicles having no regard for their own safety. The puzzle games were also received badly, being described as "15 shades of easy and 20 shades of terrible". Interrogation scenes were, in contrast, well liked, with reviewers finding the dialogue during these scenes entertaining.

The Times gave the game four stars out of five and said it was "more for 24 fans, who will instantly love it — so long as they don't mind another TV addiction to feed." The Sydney Morning Herald gave it three-and-a-half stars out of five, stating, "Newcomers to the trials and tribulations of Jack Bauer are unlikely to be impressed by this game's generic shooting and driving action. But fans of 24 will be quaking, thanks to the authentic atmosphere and gripping story, set between season two and three of the TV series." However, The A.V. Club gave it a C and stated that "For once, you'll wish you could skip the action to get to the cutscenes." Detroit Free Press gave it a similar score of two stars out of four and said: "The controls are just too unpolished to make it worthwhile, though. Movements are flaky, and aiming is far too loose. Sometimes, I got into a tight firefight where I couldn't hit a terrorist a few feet in front of me. And the driving missions are worse."

Despite the mixed reception, the Academy of Interactive Arts & Sciences nominated 24: The Game for "Outstanding Achievement in Story and Character Development" at the 10th Annual Interactive Achievement Awards.
