= David Palmer (24) =

Fictional character

- 24 character
- Dennis Haysbert as David Palmer
- First appearance: Season 1 – Episode 1
- Last appearance: Season 5 - Episode 1
- Created by: Joel Surnow; Robert Cochran
- Portrayed by: Dennis Haysbert
- Days: 1, 2, 3, 4, 5
- Other Appearances: 24: The Game

In-universe information
- Family: Keith Palmer (son); Nicole Palmer (daughter); Wayne Palmer (brother); Sandra Palmer (sister)
- Spouse: Sherry Palmer (divorced)
- Home: Baltimore, Maryland
- Political party: Democratic Party

David Palmer is a fictional character, portrayed by Dennis Haysbert in the television series 24. A U.S. Senator and, later in the series, President of the United States, Palmer serves as the show's second-most prominent protagonist, after Jack Bauer, being forced to make hard decisions as president while also facing opposing elements within his own administration. Throughout the series, Palmer's ex-wife Sherry and brother Wayne are both key figures in his administration. He has two children: a son, Keith, and a daughter, Nicole. Palmer is a member of the Democratic Party. He is in the fourth highest number of episodes of any character in the series behind Tony Almeida (126), Chloe O'Brian (125) and main character Jack Bauer (192), portrayed by Carlos Bernard, Mary Lynn Rajskub and Kiefer Sutherland, respectively.

== Characterization ==
David Palmer graduated with a Bachelor of Arts degree in Political Economy from Georgetown University and obtained his Juris Doctor from the University of Maryland School of Law. Prior to his presidency, he served as a Congressman (Representing Baltimore) and senator from Maryland. Season One also includes a reference to Palmer being a college basketball star, hitting a game-winning shot against DePaul in the Final Four. In 1979 DePaul lost to Indiana St. in the Final Four by a score of 76 – 74.

== Appearances ==
David Palmer is a United States Senator from Maryland who runs for President. He is elected after the assassination attempts against him on the day of the California primary election are foiled by CTU agent Jack Bauer. Although he initially seeks a second term, he is blackmailed to bow out of the race after the opposing candidate learns that David has lied to the chief of police in order to protect his ex-wife, Sherry Palmer, who is under suspicion for involvement in the death of one of his key supporters. When Wayne secures evidence against David he changes his mind and wants to continue running. However upon learning of the death of his ex-wife, he again decides to not seek a 2nd term.

Throughout the series, Palmer's role as president is often vital to the successful foiling of terrorist plots. Palmer is seen as a good leader who makes difficult decisions without much hesitation. On several occasions, his intervention as president and the execution of his presidential powers helps the Counter Terrorist Unit.

=== 24: Season 1 ===
David Palmer has had many difficulties due to his political life. In the first season, Palmer is the frontrunner in the race for nomination as Democratic candidate for President of the United States. His life is threatened during the course of Day 1. His political life is threatened on other fronts. His son, Keith, is shown to be a viable suspect in the murder of the man who raped his sister. Palmer investigates, but finds that telling the truth is preferable to covering it up with lies, and takes a stand in favor of his son. However, he finds out his wife, Sherry, is trying to manipulate him, both in that potential scandal, and the one Sherry tries to create. David becomes furious with Sherry, and divorces her.

David Palmer also confronts Jack Bauer in person over the events of the first ten hours, demanding a private, unrecorded interview with Bauer. Palmer, believing that Bauer wants payback for the deaths of his covert operations team, starts by demanding that Jack tell him of the other people involved in the assassination attempt on his life. Jack says he is trying to protect Palmer's life, which ultimately leads Palmer to realize he was wrong about Jack and his motives. The failed covert mission is implied to be the cause of Bauer's marital problems preceding the season, Palmer goes on to defeat his Democratic primary opponent Governor Hodges, a University of Toledo College of Law alumnus, and incumbent president Harold Barnes in the general election.

=== 24: Season 2 ===
Over a year later, David Palmer is now U.S. president. He is alerted to the threat of a nuclear bomb detonating in the U.S. He also is informed that Bauer, now an inactive agent, has contacts with people who could lead them to the bomb. Jack ignores calls from CTU, but responds to the call from President Palmer. Jack becomes an active agent again, eventually finding the bomb and detonating it in a remote area. Palmer orders attacks on the three nations responsible, as revealed by an audio known as the Cyprus Recording. Palmer then reverses course, stating that he believes the recordings to be fake, as advised by Jack, but Mike Novick, his Chief of Staff, and the vice president, Jim Prescott deem this sudden reluctance to attack as an incapability to hold the office. Prescott gathers the Cabinet members, and by one vote, David Palmer is removed from office under the provisions of the 25th Amendment. He sits in a room as a prisoner for the rest of the day, until Jack provides CTU with the evidence that the Cyprus Recording is a forgery, and the attacks are called off by Prescott.

Palmer is reinstated as president, and although Prescott and the Cabinet members who voted against Palmer offer to resign, he does not accept their resignations. Palmer does, however, immediately relieve Mike Novick of his post as chief of staff. Palmer then goes out to make a statement to the press, deeming that the threat is over. He shakes hands with many of the onlookers, one of whom happens to be Mandy, a woman hired in Day 1 to assassinate Palmer. She slips a deadly virus into his hand, and he collapses to the ground, panting.

(The extended ending presented in the 24 Season 2 boxset has him get up and say he's all right; this was filmed to stop the extras on location from leaking the real ending.)

=== 24: The Game ===
Six months after Day 2, Palmer is recovering from his assassination attempt. Although he makes televised appearances to make it appear as if he is strong, healthy, and running the nation, in actuality, vice president Jim Prescott is acting president. The reality is that Palmer is heavily medicated and uses a wheelchair. However, terrorists attempt to assassinate Prescott, leaving the vice-president in critical condition. Palmer decides at this point that he is strong enough to take over the responsibilities of being President of the United States once again.

A few months later (in the comic, 24: Midnight Sun), after the events of Day 2 and 24: The Game, President Palmer allows the opening of the Arctic National Wildlife Refuge near Fairbanks, Alaska. His reasoning behind this controversial decision is to stand up to oil companies (a reference to Max and Peter Kingsley).

=== 24: Season 3 ===
In Day 3, Palmer is faced with re-election; however, he is still the president, and is faced with many problems during the day. His lover Anne is implicated in a scandal, and although she is innocent, she leaves him. Palmer's brother admits his affair with the wife of one of his biggest supporters, and Palmer is forced to choose life or death for Jack. Palmer chooses death, but eventually is informed of a huge terrorist threat where Jack had to go undercover. He does not like it, but his faith in Jack prevails. However, Palmer falters in the end. He brings Sherry Palmer back into his life to help. She does, but in the end David cannot agree to her terms (i.e. remarrying her). After she is killed as a result of a political scandal, he ultimately decides not to run for re-election, again preferring his principles over everything else.

At the end of Season 3, after a Presidential debate, he decides to cancel his re-election campaign. His opponent in the election, U.S. Senator John Keeler of Minnesota, becomes president in Season 4.

=== 24: Season 4 ===
In Day 4, President Keeler is incapacitated when Air Force One (forced to remain in flight during the current attacks, even though just returning from Mexico) is shot down by terrorists.

Despite his initial hesitation, Vice President Charles Logan, under the 25th Amendment, becomes Acting President, due to President Keeler's condition (he is in a coma). From the very beginning, Logan shows poor judgement abilities. He demands the arrest of Jack Bauer, which ruins any opportunity to arrest Habib Marwan. When that raid fails, Logan finally realized he is not up to the task, and seeks Mike Novick for counsel.

Mike Novick, Palmer's former chief of staff, recommends that former president David Palmer be brought in to assist the acting president. Palmer effectively leads the events in the latter part of Day 4, but realizes that Logan is a weak-willed commander in chief unable to demonstrate Presidential leadership. Logan blames Palmer when things go wrong, but takes full credit when things go his way. After the terrorists are finally brought down, Logan infamously tells Palmer, he "played a role", in the season finale.

When David saves Jack's life by warning him about the Secret Service agent being sent to kill him, Palmer becomes one of the four people who knows Jack is alive.

=== 24: Season 5 ===
In the opening moments of Day 5, David Palmer is discussing his memoir with his brother Wayne in his penthouse apartment. Wayne notices David seems distracted and worried about a matter that he quickly disregards. At 7:02 a.m., a sniper from the adjacent building shoots through the window, hitting Palmer in the neck, killing him. It is later revealed that the assassin, a man named Haas, had received his orders from Christopher Henderson, who is secretly working for President Charles Logan and Graem Bauer. The conspirators also order the deaths of Michelle Dessler, Tony Almeida and Chloe O'Brian, although the planned assassinations of Chloe and Tony are unsuccessful (Tony was stabbed by Henderson later on, and was presumed dead). Both Haas and Henderson are killed by Jack Bauer in retribution for their role in the deaths of his friends. David Palmer is found to be the primary target for discovering information about someone within the Logan administration who was working with the terrorists.

At the close of the day, David Palmer is given a state procession, as his body was flown back to Washington, watched on by the President and First Lady. Following a speech by President Logan praising Palmer, the President is taken into custody on orders from the Attorney General who has just heard a recording incriminating Logan in Palmer's assassination.

Dennis Haysbert was disappointed that his character was killed in the fifth season, commenting that it continued an American legacy of killing its popular and charismatic leaders. He did, however, continue to watch the show and remained a fan.

== Reception ==
A poll by Blockbuster named Palmer as respondents' Favorite On-Screen President. Lovefilm.com visitors also named him the TV President they would most like to see in the Oval Office. Haysbert has also been nominated for a Golden Globe, a Satellite Award and three NAACP Image Awards for his portrayal of Palmer.

On an episode of The Daily Show that aired on June 4, 2008, host Jon Stewart remarked (in a clear reference to David Palmer) that newly christened presumptive Democratic nominee Barack Obama will be the first African American candidate for President of the United States "since the first season of 24."

Pundits, and indeed Dennis Haysbert himself, have claimed that Haysbert's portrayal of David Palmer allowed viewers to become more comfortable with the idea of an African American president and consequently may have helped the political campaign of Obama, who was elected the 44th president on November 4, 2008. Commentators have called this influence the "Palmer effect", in contrast to the Bradley effect.
