= Carlos Bernard =

American actor and director

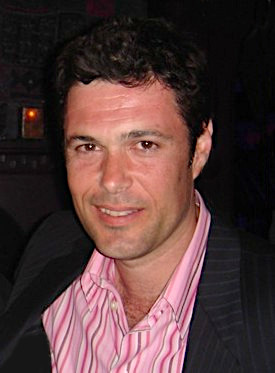
- Carlos Bernard in 2006
- Born: Carlos Bernard Papierski; October 12, 1962 (age 63); Evanston, Illinois, U.S.
- Education: New Trier High School; Illinois State University (BA); American Conservatory Theater (MFA)
- Occupations: Actor; director
- Years active: 1996–present
- Notable work: Tony Almeida on 24
- Spouses: Sharisse Baker (m. 1999–2010); Tessie Santiago (m. 2013)
- Children: 2

Carlos Bernard Papierski (born October 12, 1962) is an American actor and director, best known for his role as Tony Almeida in 24, which he played from 2001 to 2006, and then reprised again in 2009, 2014 in 24: Solitary and 2017 in 24: Legacy. He received a fine arts degree from American Conservatory Theater in San Francisco after receiving an undergraduate degree from Illinois State University.

== Early life and education ==
Bernard, who was born on October 12, 1962, in Evanston, Illinois and grew up in Chicago, Illinois as the youngest of three brothers, is of Polish and Spanish ancestry, with his mother originally from Madrid, Spain. Bernard graduated from New Trier High School in 1980, and showed signs of interest in acting while in his high school years. He then went to Illinois State University, graduating with a bachelor's degree in 1991 and shortly after received his Master of Fine Arts degree in San Francisco in the American Conservatory Theater. Bernard started out on stage but quickly progressed to television.

== Career ==
Bernard performed in A.C.T. stage productions:

- Good with William Hurt
- As You Like It
- Hamlet
- The Diary of Anne Frank
- The Cherry Orchard

At the Mark Taper Forum in Los Angeles, he performed in Scenes from an Execution, with Frank Langella.

Bernard has made guest appearances on Walker, Texas Ranger, Burn Notice, F/X: The Series, Babylon 5, and Silk Stalkings and appeared as a regular on the daytime soap opera, The Young and the Restless. He has appeared in the feature films Alien Raiders, Vegas, City of Dreams, The Killing Jar, and the short film The Colonel's Last Flight.

== Personal life ==
Bernard speaks fluent Spanish, Russian, English, and German.

Bernard has been married to actress Tessie Santiago since 2013. They have a son born in August 2018. He also has one child, who was born in August 2003, with ex-wife Sharisse Baker. He is friends with Kiefer Sutherland, Reiko Aylesworth and Mary Lynn Rajskub, with whom he starred in 24.

== Filmography ==
=== Acting ===
Year	Title	Role	Notes
1997	The Killing Jar	Chajén	
1997	Sunset Beach	Intern	4 episodes
1997	Night Man	Parker's Henchman	Episode: "In the Still of the Night"
1997	Silk Stalkings	Bradley Babcock	Episode: "Pink Elephants"
1997	F/X: The Series	Roberto	Episode: "French Kiss"
1998	Men in White	Alien	TV movie
1999	The Young and the Restless	Rafael Delgado	18 episodes
1999	Babylon 5: A Call to Arms	Communications	TV movie
2000	The Colonel's Last Flight	Rosario	Short
2000	Mars and Beyond	Lt. Ronaldo Alvarez	Short
2001	Vegas, City of Dreams	Chico Escovedo	
2001	Walker, Texas Ranger	Raoul 'Skull' Hidalgo	Episode: "Without a Sound"
2001–2009	24	Tony Almeida	115 episodes plus one special, 24: Solitary
2006	10.5: Apocalypse	Dr. Miguel Garcia	2 episodes
2006	24: The Game	Tony Almeida	Video Game, voice
2007	Nurses	Dr. Richmond	TV movie
2008	Alien Raiders	Aaron Ritter	
2010	Burn Notice	Gabriel	Episode: "Good Intentions"
2010	Full Nelson		
2010	Angel Camouflaged	Jude Stevens	
2010	Scoundrels	Det. Sgt. Mack	Main role
2010	The Blue Wall	David Keenan	Short
2011	Ghost Storm	Sheriff Hal Miller	TV movie
2011	Charlie's Angels	Pajaro / Rodrigo	Episode: "Angel with a Broken Wing"
2011–2012	CSI: Miami	Diego Navarro – Nemesis of Horatio Caine	3 episodes
2012	Hawaii Five-0	Agent Channing	2 episodes
2012–2013	Dallas	Vicente Cano	Recurring role
2013	Castle	Jared Stack	Episode: "The Human Factor"
2014	Motive	Kurt Taylor	Episode: "Overboard"
2014	Major Crimes	Pete Sims	Episode: "Acting Out"
2015	Lavalantula	Interrogator	
2015	Madam Secretary	Manuel Barzan	Episode: "You Say You Want a Revolution"
2015–2017	The Inspectors	Henry Wainwright	Director, 24 episodes
2017	24: Legacy	Tony Almeida	6 episodes
2017	Supergirl	Oscar Rodas	Episode: "Far From the Tree"
2019	The Orville	Capt. Marcos	Episode: "Identity Part II"
2022	The Lincoln Lawyer	Robert Cardone	3 episodes

=== Other work ===
Year	Title	Role	Notes
2012	Your Father's Daughter	Writer / Producer / Director	Short
2015–2017	The Inspectors	Director	5 episodes
2016–2019	Hawaii Five-0	Director	4 episodes
2017	Criminal Minds	Director	Episode: "Unforgettable"
2017–2020	MacGyver	Director	3 episodes
2019	Magnum P.I.	Director	Episode: "Honor Among Thieves"
2020–present	FBI	Director	
2020	Bull	Director	Episode: "The Sovereigns"
2021–2025	FBI: Most Wanted	Director	
2025	Law & Order	Director	Episode: "Folk Hero"
