= Day 5: 7:00 a.m. – 8:00 a.m. =

- 24 episode
- Dennis Haysbert as David Palmer in a pivotal scene from the first hour of 24: Day 5
- Episode no.: Season 5 Episode 1
- Directed by: Jon Cassar
- Written by: Howard Gordon
- Production code: 5AFF01
- Original air date: January 15, 2006
- Running time: 43 minutes

Guest appearances
- Reiko Aylesworth as Michelle Dessler; Jude Ciccolella as Mike Novick; Connie Britton as Diane Huxley; Brady Corbet as Derek Huxley; Sandrine Holt as Evelyn Martin; Jonah Lotan as Spenser Wolff; John Allen Nelson as Walt Cummings; D. B. Woodside as Wayne Palmer; Thomas Vincent Kelly as Marc Besson; Jeff Kober as Conrad Haas; Eric Winzenried as Kohler; Dennis Haysbert as David Palmer

Episode chronology
← Previous "Day 4: 6:00 a.m. – 7:00 a.m."	Next → "Day 5: 8:00 a.m. – 9:00 a.m."
- 24 season 5

"Day 5: 7:00 a.m. – 8:00 a.m." is the fifth season premiere of the American action drama television series 24, and the 97th episode overall. It was written by executive producer Howard Gordon and directed by co-executive producer Jon Cassar. The episode was broadcast as the first hour of a two-night, four-hour season premiere, airing at 8:00 p.m. on Sunday, January 15, 2006, on Fox. The premiere was pre-empted by fifteen minutes on the East Coast by an NFL Playoff Game.

The episode picks up eighteen months after Jack faked his own death in order to avoid assassination by rogue government agents. During this episode, Jack is forced to come out of hiding after a clandestine group begins assassinating those who know he is still alive.

The first hour of the fifth season was both highly controversial and critically acclaimed. It was the most watched episode of 24 of all-time. Kiefer Sutherland won the Primetime Emmy Award for Outstanding Lead Actor in a Drama Series for his work in this season by submitting this episode. Series director Jon Cassar won both a Primetime Emmy Award and a Directors Guild of America Award for directing this episode.

== Plot ==
The fifth season picks up eighteen months after Jack Bauer faked his own death to avoid assassination by corrupt United States government officials. He is now living under the alias 'Frank Flynn' in Mojave, California. He is renting a room in the house of a single mother, Diane Huxley, and her teenage son, Derek, who is antagonistic towards Jack.

Back in Los Angeles, David Palmer paces across the room of his penthouse as he discusses the writing of his memoirs with his brother Wayne. Wayne confronts David about his mood since returning to Los Angeles, just as Palmer lingers over a newspaper headline referring to a peace treaty to be signed that day by current President Charles Logan and the president of Russia. David brushes off Wayne's concerns and turns away to the window. As Palmer looks out on Los Angeles, an assassin's bullet flies through the window and hits him in the neck. Wayne screams for help and cradles his dying brother.

The news of Palmer's assassination spreads quickly through the Counter Terrorist Unit and news media, as President Logan, Mike Novick, Chloe O'Brian and Jack Bauer learn the news. Michelle Dessler and Tony Almeida watch the news from home. They now run their own security company. Despite a meeting the two have scheduled that day with a man named Rick Rosen, Michelle leaves for CTU, citing that the agency will need her. Tony calls Rick and explains that Michelle won't be attending their meeting. Tony thinks for a moment and seemingly changes his mind, saying that he will also be going to CTU. As Tony says this, an explosion rips through his front window. Tony runs out of the house, screaming Michelle's name, as he sees a car bomb has destroyed her car. Tony finds Michelle's body on the ground just as a second explosion knocks him unconscious.

As Chloe leaves her home after a one-night stand, she discovers that a group of men are following her. Chloe connects the dots, calls Jack, and reasons that David, Tony, Michelle, and herself were all targeted because they knew Jack was alive. Jack tells Chloe to meet him at an oil refinery in Los Angeles. As he makes his way to Los Angeles, Jack finds out that Derek has been following him, forcing Jack to take Derek with him.

Outside President Logan's Hidden Valley Retreat, Logan gives a speech memorializing David Palmer. Inside the retreat, First Lady Martha Logan finds out that Palmer was killed from the chief of staff and has a meltdown, nearly causing a scene in front of press corps. Later, Martha tells Charles that she believes Palmer was killed because of something he was going to tell her. Logan dismisses his wife's worries, afterwards telling his chief of staff that Martha is having another one of her delusions.

After stealing a rescue helicopter, Jack meets Chloe at the abandoned oil refinery, with Derek in tow. As Chloe arrives, the group of mercenaries in pursuit attack Jack and Chloe. Jack gives Chloe a gun and tells her to hide with Derek. Jack throws smokebombs and engages in a firefight with the mercenaries. Soon enough, only one of the mercenaries, Conrad Haas, is left standing. Conrad is wounded by Chloe and Jack asks him for information in exchange for medical assistance. Conrad reveals that the main goal was to frame Bauer for the assassinations. Jack puts two and two together and realizes that Conrad was the one who shot President David Palmer. After a moment of consideration, Jack stands up and puts two bullets in the man who killed his friend and president.

== Production ==
=== Casting ===
This episode is notable for the number of cast member deaths. Fox revealed that the season would open with at least one major death prior to the episode's premiere. Dennis Haysbert, who had been with the show since the first season, was reluctant to film the scene where David Palmer is assassinated. The character was originally slated to die in Season 4, but Dennis said he "just refused to do it for a great many months. Then they sent one of my friends, who's now the show's runner, and he convinced me to do it because they needed to launch the season - I believe that was Season Five - and they said they really couldn't do it without me having the characters assassinated. I acquiesced, but if I had to do it over again, I wouldn't do it."

Reiko Aylesworth, who had played the character of Michelle Dessler since the premiere of the second season, was more satisfied with her death. During a press junket for the third season, Reiko noted that "I went in in the second year, so I already knew that major characters get killed off. I was, and am fine with that, I just want to make sure that I go out with a good storyline - give me a good death [laughs]. I was just surprised that they keep bringing me back. I was definitely surprised that I've got the run that I've had so far." In 2008, Reiko said, "I was only bummed with how I went out; I wanted it to be in a hail of bullets."

=== Filming ===
Several last minute changes were made to the episode including the scene in which Bauer watches the news report about Palmer's death. Additionally, Jon Cassar decided to re-film a scene to allow the audience to see Mary Lynn Rajskub's tattoo when he noticed that she had one. Like most seasons of 24, the later plot developments had not yet been decided by the time the premiere was filmed. This is apparent when Tony is being wheeled into the medical room. Half of Tony's face was covered because of uncertainty about what his injury was going to be. The final scene of the episode was shot in an oil refinery owned by Cenco. Kiefer Sutherland remembers that the cast and crew were required to listen to a half-hour safety speech before they were allowed to film.

== Reception ==
=== Ratings ===
The season premiere was preceded by an overrun Panthers-Bears NFL Playoff Game that preempted the premiere by fifteen minutes on the east coast. Nevertheless, the premiere was highly promoted. The New York Times wondered before the premiere "whether "24" can build on its average viewing audience of 12.1 million from Season 4 (an increase of 20 percent over the previous year) and sustain enough new and plausible plotlines to complement its trademark split-screen images and tense action sequences." The New York Times also noted that 24 was Fox's most upscale show and the strongest franchise behind American Idol. It was the most watched episode of 24 of all-time, earning 17 million viewers and a 7.3 rating in the 18-49 demographic. Ratings were up 16 percent in adults 18-49 and 11 percent in total viewers from the previous season premiere. It was Fox's highest rated Sunday since the previous year's Super Bowl telecast.

=== Critical reception ===
Critical response to the episode was very positive. The New York Times reported that the fifth season "provides an irresistible blend of iPodish computer wizardry and "Perils of Pauline" cliffhanger suspense" and that it is one of the few shows that is "sophisticated and also have a childish appeal". USA Today called the four-hour premiere "extraordinary" and the fifth season as the series at its "fast, furious, exaggerated best, filled with well-drawn subsidiary characters and rapid-fire surprises, all held in place by Kiefer Sutherland's great, under-sung performance as Jack." The Hollywood Reporter reviewer Tim Goodman, usually a heavy critic of the series, said after a viewing the premiere, "you need to be a part of this. You need to doff the skepticism and get on the ride." The Chicago Sun-Times said of Season Five that "TV shows don't elicit such high praise often enough. But the fifth season of this filmlike thriller is metaphorically knocking my socks off."

Martha Logan's introductory scene in this episode has been called "the most memorable character debut in 24 history". The scene involved her becoming unsatisfied with her First Lady hairdo and dunking her head into her bathroom sink, idiosyncratically telling her helper "let's start over".

=== Awards ===
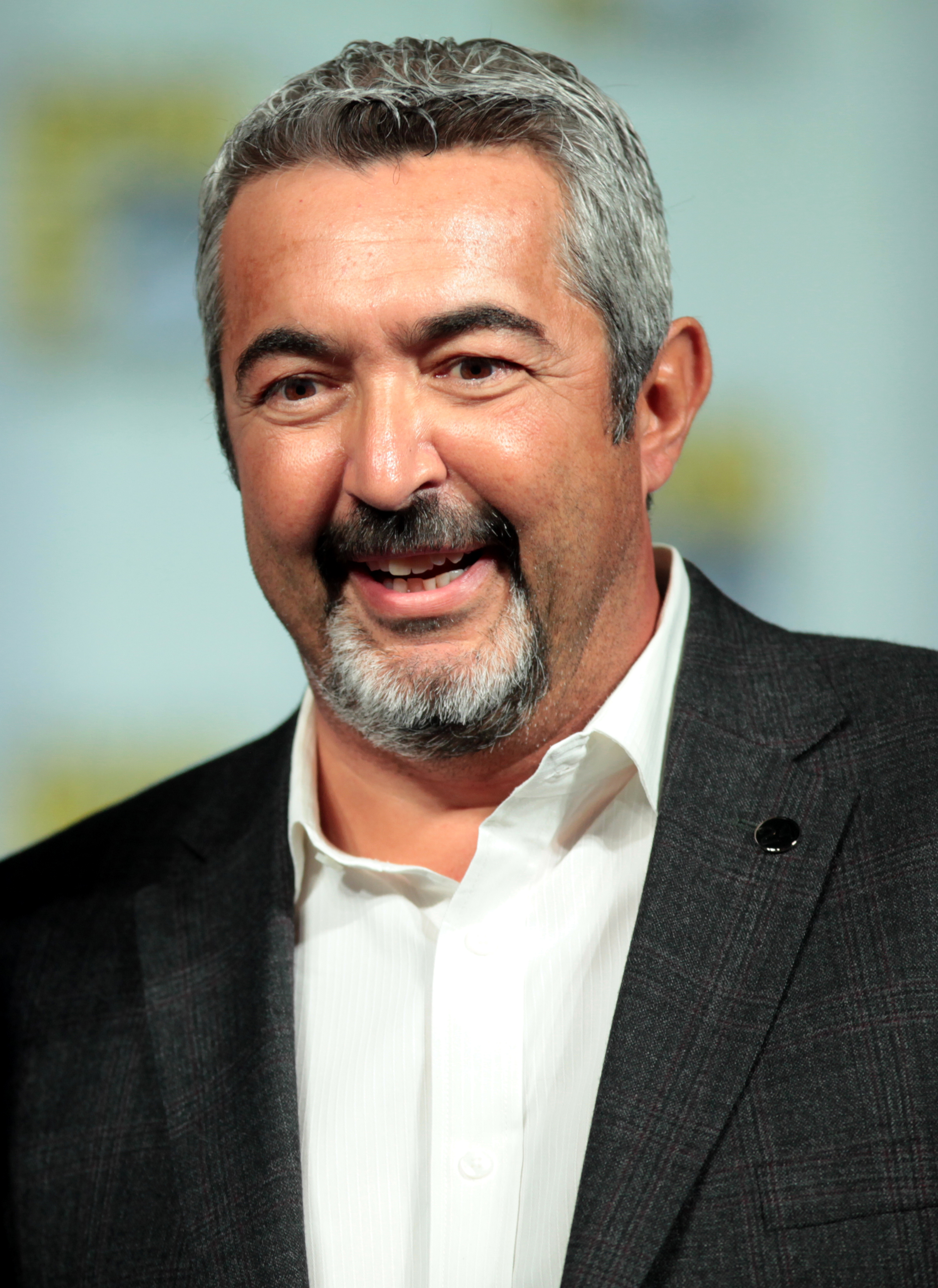
Jon Cassar won several awards for his direction of the episode.

Kiefer Sutherland chose this episode as his Primetime Emmy Award submission for Outstanding Lead Actor in a Drama Series at the 58th Primetime Emmy Awards. He would eventually win for this episode, while this episode was also one of the six submitted to the Emmys for Outstanding Drama Series, which 24 would also win for.

On February 3, 2007, Jon Cassar won the Directors Guild of America Award for Outstanding Directing – Drama Series for directing this hour. On Sunday, August 27, 2006, Cassar won the Primetime Emmy Award for Outstanding Directing for a Drama Series for his work on this episode. In addition, this episode also won the Primetime Emmy Award for Outstanding Single-Camera Picture Editing for a Drama Series for David Latham. This episode also earned a Primetime Emmy Award nomination for Outstanding Single-Camera Sound Mixing for a Series and a Cinema Audio Society Awards nomination for Outstanding Achievement in Sound Mixing for a Television Series for Mike Olman (re-recording mixer), Ken Kobett (re-recording mixer), and William Gocke (production mixer).
