= Martha Logan =

Character from the television series 24

- 24 character
- Jean Smart as Martha Logan
- First appearance: Day 5 – Episode 1
- Last appearance: Day 6 – Episode 13
- Portrayed by: Jean Smart
- Days: 5, 6

In-universe information
- Spouse: Charles Logan (Divorced)

Martha Logan is a fictional character played by Jean Smart in the series 24. As a First Lady of the United States within the 24 universe, she is the capable yet mercurial wife of the corrupt U.S. President Charles Logan. Critics praised Martha Logan as the breakout character of the show's 2005–2006 season.

In developing Martha Logan's character, the show's writers drew upon the historic example of a prominent whistleblower in the Watergate scandal, Martha Beall Mitchell. Similar to the real-life model, Martha Logan becomes contemptuous of her husband's conduct in office and decides to go public and end his career. Martha Logan takes part in a plot to get her husband to confess that he conspired with terrorists. Yet her mental health problems undermine her credibility and raise the possibility that she may be forced into treatment at an inpatient facility. After the events of the fifth season she was committed to a mental health facility.

== Concept and creation ==
The inspiration for Martha Logan was Martha Beall Mitchell, the wife of John N. Mitchell, Attorney General during the Nixon administration. Mrs. Mitchell was a key whistleblower who contacted the press to disclose facts about the Watergate scandal, and for a time her statements were discredited because people believed she had a mental illness. Nixon said that "Watergate would have not occurred without Martha Mitchell."

Howard Gordon, the executive producer of 24, said that, during character development, they "wanted an actress that had the strength and intelligence to be a first lady, yet have the unpredictability of never knowing when she might snap." Jean Smart was their first choice. Smart later told The New York Times that she decided she was eager to play the role after reading the character's introductory scene, and commented that in her almost 30 years of acting she had come across few roles that offered the possibilities that this one did: a character that is sexy, mysterious, and powerful, yet is mentally unstable and has lost her trust and respect for her husband.

Smart also said of the opening scene that: "It encapsulates that character in one moment and says so much about her impulsiveness. We could not have accomplished that with a dozen speeches. When I saw it in the script, I thought 'this is great, this lady is going to be fun to play.'"

On her first day on set, Smart was shocked to learn the producers wanted to cut the scene, a decision she felt was a mistake. She said "They had done this brilliant thing and now they were going to undo it. They were just being practical. They said, "It would be hours to get you back, your hair, your make-up." Smart spoke to the hair and makeup artists and guaranteed producers they could get it right in two takes; they did it in one, and the scene stayed in.

Jean Smart's character and Martha Mitchell were both labeled "unstable." Although the real Martha Mitchell was not mentally ill, the fictional Martha Logan is, and with Smart's input the writers enhanced this aspect of the character. Smart has said of Martha that she is an impulsive, powerful, and capable woman, and that she is intelligent, but has some "chemical problems".

== Characterization ==
Martha received a Bachelor of Arts in Art History from Stanford University. Prior to becoming a figure in politics, she served as a member of the Santa Barbara Museum Board of Trustees. She was once the most trusted adviser for the indecisive President Logan. She has also been portrayed as mentally ill, afflicted by depression and anxiety. Martha is a close personal friend of David Palmer.

== Appearances ==
=== 24: Season 5 ===
Prior to his death, Palmer asks to meet Martha to discuss a "matter of national security" involving Charles Logan. After his death, Martha believes that Palmer was killed to thwart the meeting, not knowing that her husband was involved in his murder.

Several hours later, Martha is frustrated to see her husband negotiating with terrorist Vladimir Bierko and his willingness to compromise Yuri Suvarov and his wife's safety. Aaron Pierce eventually saves her from the ambush on the Suvarovs' motorcade. Martha continues to question Logan's motives as her husband attempts to prevent her from finding out about his role in Palmer's death.

When Charles reveals that he was involved in the plot to assassinate Palmer, she is deeply shocked and says that she can never forgive him. Contemplating suicide, Logan comes into her room, begging for forgiveness. Rather than accepting his apology, Martha tells him that she is horrified to be his wife.

After Jack Bauer fails to obtain a confession from Logan, she screams in public that he is a murderer during Palmer's funeral. Afterwards, President Logan hits her, and threatens to put Martha in an asylum for life. During his tirade, Logan acknowledges all of his misdeeds, unaware that there is a small listening device on his pen. The confession quickly reaches the Attorney General, who orders the U.S. Marshals to arrest Logan. As Charles is escorted away by agents, he turns to stare at Martha, who smiles at him in triumph.

=== 24: Season 6 ===
Following Day 5, Martha was admitted to a mental health facility in Vermont. Martha is romantically involved with Secret Service agent Aaron Pierce. After being persuaded to call Russian first lady Anya Suvarov to enlist her assistance in a diplomatic matter, Martha and Charles have a discussion, in which she verbally assaults Charles, and in a fit of rage, stabs him in the shoulder, severely injuring him. Several minutes after she is arrested, Martha calls Anya.

== Critical reception ==
Joe Rhodes of The New York Times devoted a review to the character on February 19, 2006:

About the only thing viewers might not have been able to anticipate was that this season's break-out character would be a high-strung, sharp-tongued and off-her-meds first lady of the United States, a woman who screams, "I will have your family eating dog food out of a can" at Secret Service agents trying to keep her away from a presidential news conference.

Rhodes described Martha Logan's debut scene as "perhaps the most memorable character debut in 24 history." In the debut scene, she proclaimed, "I look like a wedding cake" just before dunking her face into the bathroom sink. Her marriage to President Logan was described by producer Howard Gordon as "one of the highlights of this year." Smart was also nominated for an Emmy for her performance, Best Supporting Actress in a Drama Category, but lost the award to Blythe Danner.
