= James Morrison (actor) =

American actor (born 1954)

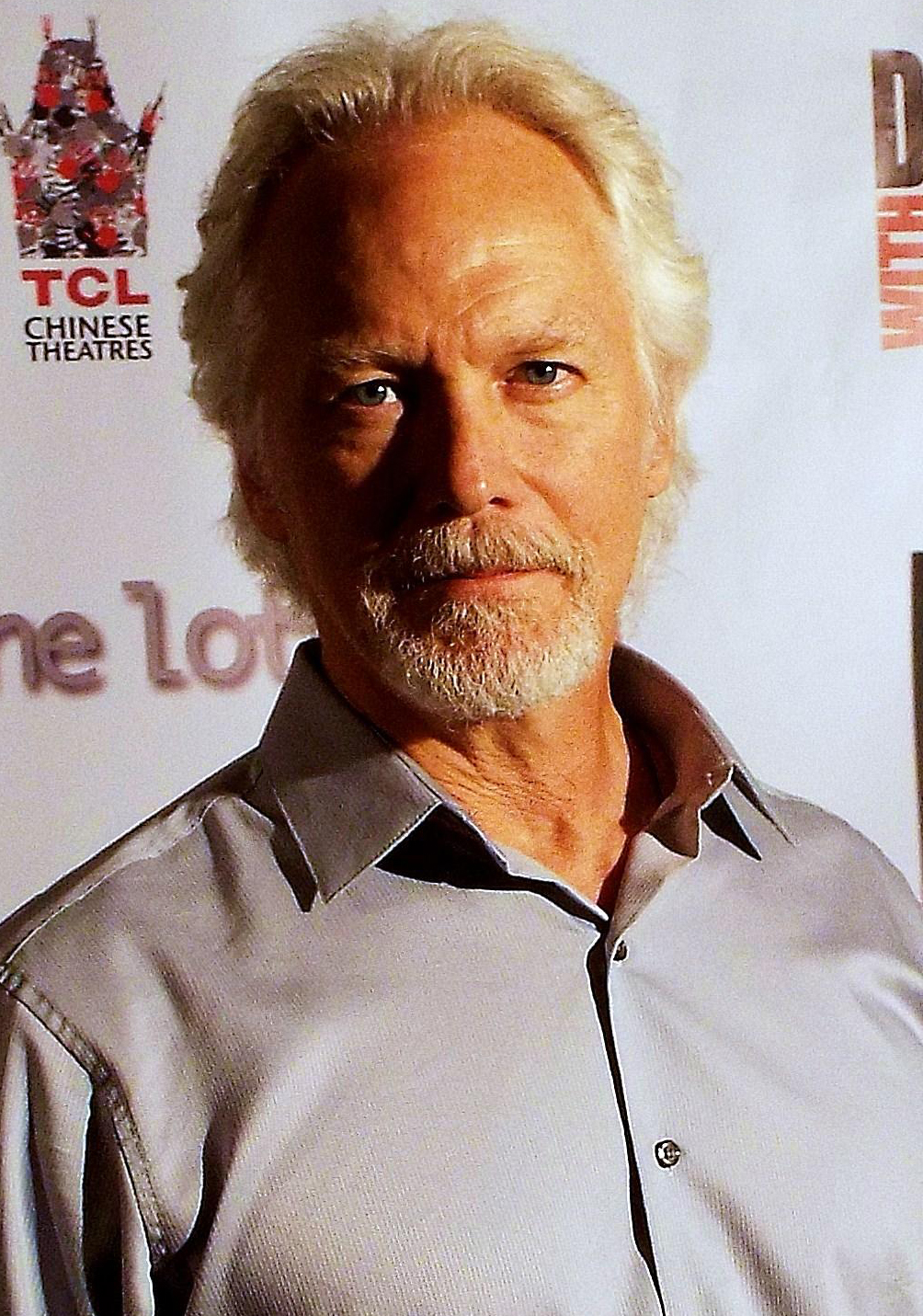
- James Morrison at The Jazz Funeral world premiere (2014)
- Born: James Paige Morrison; April 21, 1954 (age 72); Bountiful, Utah, US
- Occupation: Actor
- Years active: 1984–present
- Spouse: Riad Galayini
- Children: Seamus Morrison
- Website: www.jpmorrison.com

James Paige Morrison (born April 21, 1954) is an American actor best known for his portrayal of CTU Director Bill Buchanan on 24.

== Life and career ==
Morrison was born in Bountiful, Utah, the son of an office manager, and was raised in Anchorage, Alaska. A professional theater actor, Morrison has been on the professional stage since the early 1980s and has won awards such as the Los Angeles Drama Critics Circle Award for Outstanding Performance. He has also directed theater productions. Morrison is a published poet, yoga teacher, and a singer-songwriter. He has composed two albums to date, which can be heard and purchased on his official website.

On television, Morrison has guest-starred in series such as Law & Order: Special Victims Unit, Frasier, Quantum Leap, The X-Files, The West Wing and Six Feet Under. Morrison frequently works with producers Glen Morgan and James Wong, and was a main cast member of their 1995 series Space: Above and Beyond. He also worked with Wong in the movie The One as hero Jet Li's best friend.

He portrayed CTU Director Bill Buchanan on 24. He began as a guest star midway through the fourth season (2005), and was a main cast member in the fifth, sixth, and seventh seasons (2006, 2007, 2009).

His plays have been developed by the Sundance Institute (Idle Wheels) and the Ojai Playwrights Conference (his one-man play, Leave Your Fears Here).

Morrison and his wife, Riad Galayini, co-directed and produced the feature documentary Showing Up. The documentary examines the audition process, with working actors reflecting on the process and how it affects them, including: Kristin Chenoweth, Richard Griffiths, Zoe Kazan, Nathan Lane, Chris Messina, Sam Rockwell, Bill Irwin and Eli Wallach.

== Filmography ==
=== Actor ===
Year	Title	Format	Role
1984	Automan	TV	Gary Baxley
1984	Fatal Vision	TV movie	Green Beret
1986	North and South, Book II	Miniseries	Bradley
1987	Werewolf	TV	
1987	Unfinished Business	Film	Jonathan
1989	Monsters	TV	Steven Rose, PhD
1989	Houston Knights	TV	Steven Kayden
1990	Good Cops, Bad Cops	TV movie	Lt. Brill
1990	An Enemy of the People	TV movie	Captain Horster
1990	Last Flight Out	TV movie	Elliot
1990	Capital News	TV	
1991	Quantum Leap	TV	Joe Deever
1991	Doogie Howser, M.D.	TV	Mr. Stevens, father of Will
1992	L.A. Law	TV	Walter Phelps
1993	Falling Down	Film	Construction Sign Man by Bus Stop
1993	Bob	TV	
1994	Desert Cross	Short Film	Jeremy
1994	Frasier	TV	Brian
1994	Without Warning	TV movie	Paul Whitaker
1994	Walker, Texas Ranger	TV	Ned Travis
1994	Where Are My Children?	TV movie	Handsome Man
1995	White Dwarf	TV movie	Peter
1995	The Marshal	TV	A.D.A. Chet Fields
1995–1996	Space: Above and Beyond	TV	Lt. Col. Tyrus Cassius 'T.C.' McQueen/Col. Tyrus Cassius 'T.C.' McQueen
1996	Millennium	TV	Jim Horn
1997	Brooklyn South	TV	Paul Ingelmann
1998	Seven Days	TV	Agent Carter
1998	Profiler	TV	Will Cook
1998	Shadow of Doubt	Film	Paul Saxon
1998	Diagnosis: Murder	TV	Lloyd Nichols
1998	Prey	TV	Lewis
1998	Beyond Belief: Fact or Fiction	TV	William Corzine
1999	The Wonder Cabinet	TV movie	Dr. Gordon Wayne
1999	Nash Bridges	TV	Pete Callan
1999	Abilene	Film	Bernie
2000	The Others	TV	Simeon Nye/Troy Manheim
2000	The X-Files	TV	Dr. Robert Wieder (Episode: "Theef")
2000–2001	Freedom	TV	Colonel Tim Devon
2001	The One	Film	LAPD Officer Bobby Aldrich/'A' World Inmate No. 1
2002	Catch Me If You Can	Film	Pilot
2002	JAG	TV	Maj. Gen. Lucas West
2002	Six Feet Under	TV	Swinger Husband
2002	The Division	TV	Robert
2003	CSI: Miami	TV	Charles Jeunet
2003	10-8: Officers On Duty	TV	Mark Lowry
2003	The West Wing	TV	Colonel Jesse Weiskopf
2004	Cold Case	TV	Carson Finch
2004	Wilderness Survival For Girls	Film	Ed
2004	NCIS	TV	CIA Director Roper
2005	Jarhead	Film	Mr. Swofford
2005	American Gun	Film	St Anthony's Principal
2005	Point Pleasant	TV	Kingston Nickson
2005–2009	24	TV	Bill Buchanan
2006	The Key	Short Film	Raymond
2006	Crossing	Short Film	Dad
2007	Leo	Short Film	Acting Teacher
2007	Numb3rs	TV	Cmdr. Chris Frederickson
2008	Reflections	Film	Dr. Paul Wolley
2009	Eli Stone	TV	Dan Buckley
2009–2010	Private Practice	TV	William White
2009–2011	HawthoRNe	TV	John Morrissey
2010	Law & Order: LA	TV	Gray Campbell
2010	The Mentalist	TV	Warner Vander Hoek
2010	Raspberry Magic	Film	Henry Hooper
2010	The Deep End	TV	Jonathan Mather
2011	Suits	TV	Jerome Jensen
2011	Finding Hope	Film	U.S. Attorney Peter Gwynn
2011	Charlie's Angels	TV	Jon Cartwright
2011	Seeds of Destruction	TV movie	Frame Marcos
2012	I Am I	Film	Keith
2012	Blue	Web Series	Olsen
2012	Revenge	TV	Gordon Murphy
2012	The Exes	TV	Jonathan Hubner/Mr. Hubner
2013	The Slippery Slope	Short Film	Mr. Penzance
2014	The Jazz Funeral	Film	Nick
2014	The Switch	Film	Boss 2
2014	Swiped	Short Film	Hamilton/Hank
2014	Those Who Kill	TV	Commander Frank Bisgaard
2015	Brooklyn Nine-Nine	TV	Dan Yaeger
2016	Castle	TV	Deputy Commissioner Malone
2017	Call of the Void	Film	Peter
2017	Pray for Rain	Film	Patrick Waring
2017	The Meanest Man in Texas	Film	Sheriff Kilborn
2017	NCIS	TV	CIA Senator Phillips
2017	Twin Peaks	TV	Warden Dwight Murphy
2017	The Orville	TV	Kemka, If the Stars Should Appear
2019	The Twilight Zone	TV	Bob Jeff (voice; in "The Blue Scorpion")
2020	Intersect	Film	Bill Marshall
2020-2021	Law & Order: Special Victims Unit	TV	Jim Rollins

=== Producer ===
Year	Title	Format
1997	Nude Descending	Short Film
2006	Crossing	Short Film
2014	Showing Up	Documentary Feature Film

=== Director ===
Year	Title	Format
1996	Parking	Short Film
2014	Showing Up	Documentary Feature Film

=== Writer ===
Year	Title	Format
1996	Parking	Short Film
1997	Nude Descending	Short Film

== Awards and nominations ==
Awards and nominations
Year	Event	Film/Series	Award	Result
1996	Slamdance Film Festival	Parking	Best Short	Winner
2006	Primetime Emmy Awards	24	Outstanding Drama Series	Winner
2007	Screen Actors Guild Awards	24	Outstanding Performance by an Ensemble in a Drama Series	Nominee
2009	Maverick Movie Awards	Reflections	Best Supporting Actor	Nominee
