= 24 season 5 =

24
- Season 5
- Promotional poster
- Starring: Kiefer Sutherland; Kim Raver; Mary Lynn Rajskub; Carlos Bernard; Gregory Itzin; James Morrison; Roger Cross; Louis Lombardi; Jean Smart
- No. of episodes: 24

Release
- Original network: Fox
- Original release: January 15 – May 22, 2006

Season chronology
- ← Previous; Season 4 Next → Season 6

The fifth season of the American drama television series 24, also known as Day 5, premiered on January 15, 2006, on Fox and aired its season finale on May 22, 2006. The season five storyline starts and ends at 7:00 a.m. – the same time frame as the previous season.

The season received overwhelming critical acclaim and is widely regarded as the show's best season. It received twelve Primetime Emmy Award nominations with five wins, including Outstanding Drama Series.

== Season overview ==
The fifth season is set 18 months after season four. Former Counter Terrorist Unit agent Jack Bauer begins the season, working as a day-to-day laborer at an oil refinery under the alias "Frank Flynn" in Mojave, California. On a monumental day in Charles Logan's presidency, an anti-terrorism treaty with Russian president Yuri Suvarov is about to be signed when events take a tragic turn.

Season 5 is one of the 24 seasons that can be divided into three main acts:

1. In the first act, two murders force Jack to reveal himself. He attempts to save innocent people from a plot involving Russian separatists that is rapidly unfolding.
2. In the second act, the terrorists gain control of nerve gas canisters with help from corrupt officials.
3. In the final act, Jack discovers how deep the conspiracy goes and fights against numerous threats to get hold of a recording that implicates President Logan.

=== Major subplots ===
- Jack is distraught by the loss of David Palmer and Michelle Dessler. This motivates his crusade throughout the day, with him stating "this is personal" several times.
- Jack comes into contact with people who thought he was dead, including his daughter Kim Bauer and his former girlfriend Audrey Raines.
- The First Lady attempts to correct the President's perceived mistakes.
- The Vice President convinces the President to impose martial law in Los Angeles without approval from the U.S. Congress.
- Chloe loses two men in her life when one of them dies and the other is apprehended for his involvement in a murder.
- Bill Buchanan's authority at CTU is undermined first by Lynn McGill and then by Karen Hayes, though both eventually come around to his way of thinking.

=== Summary ===
Former U.S. president David Palmer is assassinated in Los Angeles, California and Jack Bauer is framed for his murder. The assassins also plan to frame Jack for the murders of Tony Almeida, Michelle Dessler and Chloe O'Brian, all of whom helped Jack fake his death. Michelle is killed when her car explodes and Tony is critically injured in a secondary explosion but Jack manages to save Chloe. After investigating David Palmer's death, Jack goes looking for further information at LA/Ontario International Airport, which is subsequently attacked by terrorists.

The terrorists are Russian separatists being coordinated by a former CIA officer named James Nathanson. They take 40 people hostage in an attempt to dissuade President Logan from signing a landmark anti-terrorism treaty with Russian president Yuri Suvarov. Terrorists, led by Vladimir Bierko, use the plot as a diversion to steal 20 canisters of VX nerve gas. While searching for the nerve gas, Jack discovers the involvement of James Nathanson and White House Chief of Staff Walt Cummings. They plan to release nerve gas on Russian soil and use that as an excuse for invoking the military clauses of the treaty, allowing Logan to secure American petroleum interests in Central Asia. David Palmer was killed because he was beginning to find out about their plan. The terrorists weren't aware of this plot, believing they were being assisted by the American conspirators to smuggle the gas to Moscow, through their base in Asia and use it to attack Moscow in retaliation for Russia not giving the country the terrorists come from their independence and freedom from Russian rule.

The nerve gas is deployed at Sunrise Hills Shopping Mall (resulting in 10–20 fatalities out of eight-nine hundred shoppers) and Tyler Memorial Hospital (unsuccessfully due to the actions of CTU and Curtis Manning). Jack questions a former co-worker of his, Christopher Henderson, who he believes is willing to help. Instead, Henderson locks Jack in a room with a bomb, nearly killing him. Jack has Henderson brought to CTU and tortured; however, he refuses to reveal additional knowledge about the conspiracy. When terrorists break into CTU and release nerve gas there, Christopher Henderson, Tony Almeida, Jack Bauer, Kim Bauer, Chloe O'Brian, Audrey Raines and others are spared in sealed safe-rooms. About 40% of the personnel – including Edgar Stiles and Lynn McGill – are killed. When CTU is decontaminated, Jack rushes to the medical room and sees that Henderson apparently killed Tony and escaped.

The fallout from this attack convinces the Vice President to absorb CTU into Homeland Security (DHS). CTU and Homeland Security agents race to find the location of the remaining nerve gas canisters. This turns out to be Wilshire Gas Co. By incinerating the pipelines, Jack stops the nerve gas from being released and captures Vladimir Bierko. Through the assistance of Wayne Palmer (David Palmer's brother) and Evelyn Martin (Special Assistant to the First Lady), Jack discovers that President Logan is responsible for the attacks. He is at the center of a conspiracy involving Cummings, Henderson, Nathanson, a mysterious man known as Graem and a group of men who monitor and influence the actions of Logan from an undisclosed location.

Jack and Wayne retrieve a recording that implicates Logan from a bank vault and attempt to turn it over to U.S. Secretary of Defense James Heller. However, Heller's plan to get Logan to quietly resign backfires when Christopher Henderson uses Audrey as leverage to get the recording from Jack. Jack and Audrey recapture Henderson but they find that he has passed the recording on to a co-conspirator aboard a diplomatic flight. Jack boards the plane and reclaims the recording by taking the co-pilot hostage. This triggers a response from Charles Logan who tries to have the plane shot down, citing that it could be used to attack civilian targets on the ground. This causes others in Logan's inner circle to become suspicious of his motives. Jack Bauer lands the plane and delivers the recording to CTU. Logan decides to commit suicide to avoid the spectacle of a public trial, but before he can do so, a Homeland Security employee intervenes and destroys the recording, and is rewarded with a promotion by Logan.

Meanwhile, Bierko escapes CTU custody, and uses his last nerve gas container to take over a Russian submarine and gain control of twelve multiple-warhead non-nuclear land-attack missiles, each one capable of wiping out several city blocks. After cutting a deal with Christopher Henderson, Jack and Henderson together stop the attack from the submarine, and kill Bierko and his men. During a final standoff, Jack kills Henderson, who tried to shoot Jack with an unloaded pistol.

With the help of the First Lady, Mike Novick, Aaron Pierce, and Chloe, Jack is able to hijack Marine One and attempts to force Logan to confess. Though this venture proves unsuccessful, Jack manages to place a listening device on Logan. Martha then fakes a breakdown and tricks Logan into admitting his crimes, all of which is recorded on the device Jack planted on him. Chloe then forwards the recording to the U.S. Attorney General. At a memorial service for David Palmer, Logan delivers a eulogy while Secret Service agents are informed of his actions, and soon is taken away by U.S. Marshals, under orders from the Attorney General and relieved of the presidency.

Jack reunites with Audrey, however, Jack is kidnapped by Chinese agents, who had somehow discovered he was still alive. The season ends with a bound and beaten Jack on a cargo ship headed for China.

== Characters ==
Season 5 main cast: (from left to right) Carlos Bernard, Louis Lombardi, James Morrison, Mary Lynn Rajskub, Kiefer Sutherland, Kim Raver, Roger Cross, Jean Smart, and Gregory Itzin

=== Starring ===
- Kiefer Sutherland as Jack Bauer (24 episodes)
- Kim Raver as Audrey Raines (23 episodes)
- Mary Lynn Rajskub as Chloe O'Brian (24 episodes)
- Carlos Bernard as Tony Almeida (6 episodes)
- Gregory Itzin as President Charles Logan (23 episodes)
- James Morrison as Bill Buchanan (23 episodes)
- Roger Cross as Curtis Manning (19 episodes)
- Louis Lombardi as Edgar Stiles (13 episodes)
- Jean Smart as First Lady Martha Logan (23 episodes)

=== Special guest stars ===
- Sean Astin as Lynn McGill (10 episodes)
- William Devane as Secretary of Defense James Heller (3 episodes)
- Elisha Cuthbert as Kim Bauer (2 episodes)
- Reiko Aylesworth as Michelle Dessler (1 episode)

=== Special guest appearance by ===
- Dennis Haysbert as David Palmer (1 episode)

=== Guest starring ===
- Jude Ciccolella as Mike Novick (21 episodes)
- Glenn Morshower as Aaron Pierce (15 episodes)
- Jayne Atkinson as Karen Hayes (12 episodes)
- Julian Sands as Vladimir Bierko (11 episodes)
- Peter Weller as Christopher Henderson (11 episodes)
- Sandrine Holt as Evelyn Martin (10 episodes)
- Stephen Spinella as Miles Papazian (10 episodes)
- John Allen Nelson as Walt Cummings (7 episodes)
- D. B. Woodside as Wayne Palmer (7 episodes)
- Connie Britton as Diane Huxley (6 episodes)
- Brady Corbet as Derek Huxley (6 episodes)
- Nick Jameson as Russian President Yuri Suvarov (6 episodes)
- Jonah Lotan as Spenser Wolff (6 episodes)
- Mark Sheppard as Ivan Erwich (6 episodes)
- Ray Wise as Vice President Hal Gardner (6 episodes)
- Geraint Wyn Davies as James Nathanson (6 episodes)
- Kathleen Gati as Russian First Lady Anya Suvarov (5 episodes)
- Kate Mara as Shari Rothenberg (5 episodes)
- Paul McCrane as Graem Bauer (5 episodes)
- Stana Katic as Collette Stenger (3 episodes)
- Henry Ian Cusick as Theo Stoller (2 episodes)
- C. Thomas Howell as Barry Landes (2 episodes)
- Carlo Rota as Morris O'Brian (2 episodes)
- Tzi Ma as Cheng Zhi (1 episode)

== Episodes ==
No. overall	No. in season	Title	Directed by	Written by	Original release date	Prod. code	US viewers (millions)
97	1	"Day 5: 7:00 a.m. – 8:00 a.m."	Jon Cassar	Howard Gordon	January 15, 2006	5AFF01	17.01
18 months after the events of Day 4, President Charles Logan is preparing to sign an anti-terrorism treaty with Yuri Suvarov, the Russian president. Jack Bauer is revealed to be living with another identity while dating a widow named Diane Huxley, whose son, Derek, suspects Bauer. While visiting Wayne Palmer in Los Angeles, David Palmer is assassinated by a man, while Michelle Dessler is killed in an explosion and Tony Almeida is struck by another one, taken to CTU for medical care. CTU acquires evidence that accuses Bauer of David's assassination, also revealing that Bauer is alive. Agent Chloe O'Brian, revealed to be dating her assistant, Spenser Wolff, hears about the incidents and narrowly escapes the assassin and his men. She calls and updates Bauer, who leaves to save her, while he notices Derek following him and abducts him, and Bauer ultimately saves O'Brian and kills the assassin and his men in a battle. Meanwhile, Logan's wife, Martha, revealed to have mental disorders, tells him that David wanted to talk to her about a national security issue involving Logan before his assassination, but he doesn't listen to her.
98	2	"Day 5: 8:00 a.m. – 9:00 a.m."	Jon Cassar	Evan Katz	January 15, 2006	5AFF02	15.48
Bauer deduces that they can find out more in David's computer, which is in Wayne's apartment, and Bauer, Chloe and Derek infiltrate the perimeter set by the FBI. There, Bauer poses as an agent and enters the apartment with O'Brian's help, where he intercepts Wayne, who he is able to convince of his innocence. Bauer and O'Brian find the name of a Russian person who works in an airport, and Bauer and Derek escape the perimeter using the help of O'Brian, who is arrested and delivered to CTU, where she updates Director Bill Buchanan. After delivering Derek to Diane, Bauer enters the airport and finds the target, who kills himself, while Derek sees armed men entering the airport and goes in to warn Bauer, but the armed men start a lockdown and take everyone hostage. Meanwhile, CTU believes that there will be an attack on Suvarov at the time of his arrival at Charles' retreat, but Suvarov and his wife arrive safely. President Logan plays an audio of David talking to Martha stating that he wants to talk about something unimportant, but she believes the audio is fake.
99	3	"Day 5: 9:00 a.m. – 10:00 a.m."	Brad Turner	Manny Coto	January 16, 2006	5AFF03	14.08
Bauer hides in a scouting position at the airport and contacts Buchanan. The lead mercenary in the airport, identified as Anton Beresch, broadcasts a live video demanding President Logan not to sign the treaty, while threatening to kill the hostages, but Charles states that he will not surrender to the demand and orders CTU to save the hostages. Beresch kills one of the hostages as a warning, aired live, and brings up Derek next. Bauer demands agent Curtis Manning to start the rescue fast, but Manning states that they are not ready yet. As Beresch attempts to kill Derek, O'Brian helps Bauer remotely detonate an explosive vest worn by one of the armed men, diverting the attention from Derek. However, Chief of Staff Walt Cummings secretly informs Beresch about Bauer, causing Beresch to hold Derek at gunpoint and force Bauer to surrender. Meanwhile, Martha decides to find the original recording and convinces her personal assistant, Evelyn Martin, to cover for her so that she can escape her room. When she does, she forces a technical staff member to let her enter the archive room, where she finds the recording printout and takes it.
100	4	"Day 5: 10:00 a.m. – 11:00 a.m."	Brad Turner	Joel Surnow & Michael Loceff	January 16, 2006	5AFF04	15.70
Beresch kills another hostage and forces Bauer to tell CTU to attack from an entry that is already guarded by Beresch's men. Agent Lynn McGill arrives from District Command for supervision, while Charles announces in his press conference with Suvarov that he will not surrender to the demand, and Bauer notices Beresch giving an item to one of the hostages. As Manning and his men prepare to breach the booby-trapped entrance, McGill informs Buchanan of a hidden message in Bauer's report that implies he is under duress, making CTU reconsider their positions. As Charles and Suvarov sign the treaty, Manning's team storms in from a surprise point and a shootout starts, ending with the terrorists being eliminated and Beresch killing himself. Meanwhile, McGill orders Bauer to be arrested despite the evidence against him having been proven false, and Bauer tells Manning about the hostage associated with the kidnappers, who has now disappeared and has actually went to meet his associates, while recovering chemical weapon canisters from an underground chamber. Meanwhile, Cummings knocks Martha unconscious and recovers the paper from her.
101	5	"Day 5: 11:00 a.m. – 12:00 p.m."	Jon Cassar	Joel Surnow & Michael Loceff	January 23, 2006	5AFF05	14.22
Bauer, Diane and Derek are brought to CTU, where Bauer reunites with Audrey Raines, who is a DOD liaison there. Manning and his team track the man Bauer informed him about and they find the empty compound where traces of Sentox nerve gas are found. Cummings orders his operative to kill Bauer, and the operative manages to enter CTU with Wolff's help, but O'Brian finds out about Wolff's actions and Buchanan arrests him, though he refuses to talk. Cummings' operative lures Bauer to the medical subunit and attacks him, but Bauer manages to kill him before interrogating Wolff, who reveals Cummings' involvement. Since CTU cannot arrest him without hard evidence, Bauer suggests confronting him alone. Meanwhile, Martha tells Charles what happened to her, but he does not believe her, and Cummings convinces him to send her to a psychiatric institution. She escapes her room and Secret Service is ordered by Charles to find her, while Raines is tasked by McGill to debrief Diane.
102	6	"Day 5: 12:00 p.m. – 1:00 p.m."	Jon Cassar	David Fury	January 30, 2006	5AFF06	13.82
Bauer convinces McGill to let him capture Cummings and interrogate him personally, leaving CTU uninvolved. He contacts Mike Novick and arranges a secret meeting at the Presidential retreat before confirming his love to Raines, while Martha is found by Secret Service and returned, arranged for transfer. Cummings reveals his involvement to a seemingly ignorant President Logan, stating that he and his American associates have aided a group of Russian separatists to acquire the gas and carry it to the Russian region, where the disclosure of the existence of the gas will allow the U.S. Armed Forces to enter the region according to the treaty Charles has signed with Suvarov, and Cummings convinces President Logan to arrest Bauer instead of himself. Bauer persuades agent Aaron Pierce to free him, and they capture and torture Cummings, who reveals the location of the canisters, and President Logan has Cummings arrested, but CTU fails to find the canisters. Cummings receives a call from the operative, who promises upcoming attacks on the U.S. soil with the gas. Logan tells Martha that she was right and thus keeps her at their retreat.
103	7	"Day 5: 1:00 p.m. – 2:00 p.m."	Brad Turner	Manny Coto	February 6, 2006	5AFF07	13.70
Ivan Erwich, the operative Bauer recognized at the airport, contacts a man named Jacob Rossler, who instructs him how to prepare the canisters. One of Erwich's men challenges his decision to attack the U.S. instead of Russia, but Erwich insists on it, and after a technician successfully prepares the canisters, Erwich kills him. President Logan gives Bauer provisional authority at CTU, which intercepts the call between Erwich and Rossler. Bauer, Manning and other agents move to Rossler's residence, storming in and capturing him before finding a scared teenage girl in the bedroom, whom Rossler was keeping as a sex slave. Rossler agrees to help acquire the canisters in exchange for immunity and a safe way abroad with the girl. Bauer starts torturing him instead, but Lynn orders him to accept the deal, only for the girl to fatally shoot Rossler, killing the only known connection to the canisters. Meanwhile, Lynn's sister Jenny convinces him to meet her outside the building, where he is attacked by her boyfriend, who robs Lynn's wallet, and Cummings is found dead as a result of apparent suicide.
104	8	"Day 5: 2:00 p.m. – 3:00 p.m."	Brad Turner	Robert Cochran & Evan Katz	February 13, 2006	5AFF08	12.82
Bauer answers Rossler's phone, arranging a meeting, and heads there while wearing an earpiece. Erwich's operatives take the arranged item from Bauer, and they force him to accompany them to their destination in order to confirm it, where Bauer sees a canister in the van and informs CTU. They arrive at a shopping mall, being followed by CTU, where Bauer and Erwich's operatives enter a room with access to the ventilation system and prepare to release the gas, demanding a code from Bauer necessary to activate the canister. A debate starts at CTU on whether or not to let the operatives kill the people at the mall in order to maintain Bauer's cover and recover the other canisters. They ultimately ask Charles, who approves the sacrifice, but Bauer disobeys the order and gives the wrong code, locking the canister instead, and Erwich instructs his operatives to activate the canister another way. Bauer frees himself and kills one of the operatives while the other escapes, but some of the gas is released before Bauer disables the system. He orders an evacuation before joining agents to chase the operative, who is informed by Erwich and ordered to kill himself, which he does.
105	9	"Day 5: 3:00 p.m. – 4:00 p.m."	Tim Iacofano	Howard Gordon & David Fury	February 20, 2006	5AFF09	13.70
Manning arrests Bauer on Lynn's order, but Bauer gets a call from James Nathanson, an associate of Cummings', offering to help if Jack comes alone. He escapes from Manning and heads to the meeting location, while Erwich is killed by his boss, Vladimir Bierko, for wasting a canister on Americans. Bauer arrives at the location, where Bierko's men also arrive to kill Nathanson. A shootout starts and Nathanson dies after giving a chip to Bauer, who escapes. Analyzing the chip, O'Brian finds the name of Christopher Henderson, a person Bauer knows. Meanwhile, Lynn has Buchanan detained for facilitating Raines' communication with Bauer, then calls Jenny and requests his keycard in the wallet; she agrees but her boyfriend stops her. Bierko calls President Logan and demands the path of the Suvarovs' motorcade, threatening to release the rest of the gas on American soil. Charles accepts it, although Martha disagrees; she ultimately enters the Suvarovs' limousine, hoping to force Logan to cancel the scheme.
106	10	"Day 5: 4:00 p.m. – 5:00 p.m."	Tim Iacofano	Joel Surnow & Michael Loceff	February 27, 2006	5AFF10	13.87
Bauer heads to Henderson's workplace, distracting Henderson's secretary and entering the office, where he is knocked unconscious by Henderson. Lynn angrily ignores O'Brian's intel of an attack on the Suvarovs, but Raines and Manning manage to depose Lynn and detain him while returning Buchanan in charge, and Buchanan alerts Secret Service about the motorcade. Bierko's men attack the motorcade, but due to CTU's last minute warning, those in the Suvarovs' limousine survive the attack while the men are eliminated. After Bauer comes to, it is revealed that Henderson was previously Bauer's superior in CTU before he was framed for leaking classified information. Bauer led the investigation and had Henderson fired, but Henderson never accepted the accusation, and he denies the current one. The two men head to an underground room to search a computer for leads, but Henderson leaves while locking the door and setting a bomb to detonate, though Bauer manages to survive the explosion. Bierko calls President Logan, accusing him of betraying the deal and promising upcoming attacks as retribution.
107	11	"Day 5: 5:00 p.m. – 6:00 p.m."	Jon Cassar	Nicole Ranadive	March 6, 2006	5AFF11	11.89
Bauer heads to Henderson's house, where he captures him and his wife and tries to force Henderson to talk by torturing her, but to no avail, revealing that Henderson is more concerned about something else than his own wife. Bauer ultimately arrests Henderson and orders truth serum to be prepared for him. Meanwhile, CTU discovers that a hospital is the next target for the Sentox gas, and Manning leads a team there. They start checking the camera footage and identify Bierko's operative, who is killed, and Manning manages to find and secure the canister without any casualties. Jenny's boyfriend reveals that there is a man who will pay a large amount of money for Lynn's keycard, but the man is revealed to be one of Bierko's operatives, who arrives, kills the pair, and recovers the keycard, with the intention of infiltrating CTU. Martha gets angry with Charles for not caring for her life, and thanks Pierce for saving her life while the two briefly hold hands. Almeida regains consciousness, but Buchanan does not reveal Dessler's death to him on the physician's advice. However, Almeida secretly accesses the archive and finds the truth, leaving him devastated.
108	12	"Day 5: 6:00 p.m. – 7:00 p.m."	Jon Cassar	Duppy Demetrius & Matt Michnovetz	March 6, 2006	5AFF12	13.98
Raines tells Jack that his daughter Kim will arrive at CTU soon, but she is not informed that he is alive yet, and Raines convinces him to let her reveal it to Kim before the two reunite. An agent starts using the truth serum on Henderson, while Buchanan informs Lynn of Jenny's death, and Lynn finally reveals that his keycard is stolen. However, Bierko's operative has already infiltrated CTU and starts setting the canister at the ventilation system. As Kim arrives with her boyfriend, it is revealed that Chase Edmunds left her after she became depressed following news of Jack's death. Raines tells her about Jack, who arrives and reunites with Kim, who is stunned at him for hiding the truth, while O'Brian comments to Kim on the fates of the few people who knew Jack was alive. CTU finds out about the infiltration, and Jack manages to kill the operative. CTU initiates a lockdown as the canister activates and the gas is released, but while some manage to enter the rooms and be protected from the gas, others, including agent Edgar Stiles, are exposed and die. Meanwhile, Vice President Hal Gardner convinces President Logan to initiate a martial law to stop Bierko's men from easily moving and operating.
109	13	"Day 5: 7:00 p.m. – 8:00 p.m."	Brad Turner	Joel Surnow & Michael Loceff	March 13, 2006	5AFF13	13.72
CTU starts working to pump the gas out of the building air. O'Brian is depressed because of Stiles' death, and Kim's boyfriend reveals that he is a psychologist and starts working with O'Brian to get her to cooperate. In another room, Henderson's interrogation continues until Almeida interrupts, intending to kill him for Dessler's death, but Jack dissuades him, since Henderson is the only lead to find the canisters. Jack uses the walls to get to a room that leads to the main computer controlling the ventilation. Lynn is informed in another room that he'll have to activate the computer from his side in order for the plan to work, but he will be exposed to the gas without the chance to be saved, and he activates it before dying, allowing CTU to pump out the gas. With CTU safe, Jack encourages Kim to leave the city, while Almeida finds interrogation useless and makes another attempt on Henderson but hesitates; this allows Henderson to awaken and inject Almeida with the dangerous substance, apparently killing him, before escaping. Meanwhile, DHS agent Karen Hayes is tasked with going to CTU to replace personnel and assume command, and a woman named Collette Stenger is revealed to be associated with Bierko.
110	14	"Day 5: 8:00 p.m. – 9:00 p.m."	Brad Turner	Teleplay by : Howard Gordon & Evan Katz< Story by : Sam Montgomery	March 20, 2006	5AFF14	13.71
Stenger meets Bierko and sells him the schematics of a specific building. CTU finds Stenger's identity in Henderson's PC, and Bauer leads a team to capture her. They arrive at her hotel room, where they only find her boyfriend, Theo Stoller, who reveals that he is a German intelligence operative and Stenger is his mission, stating that she is too valuable to be handed to the Americans. Bauer secretly makes a deal with him to hand over an important NSA list, and Stoller accepts after seeing the list, which is recovered by O'Brian secretly hacking the NSA server. Stoller leads CTU to an airport where he and Stenger planned to meet, and Stenger is arrested. Bauer hands over the chip containing the list to Stoller, who leaves, but the chip self-destructs later as Bauer had planned. In exchange for immunity, Stenger states that her associate inside CTU is Raines. Meanwhile, Wayne calls Pierce and informs him that a government authority was behind David's assassination. They arrange a meeting at the retreat, but Wayne is attacked on the road and crashes; he escapes into a sewer.
111	15	"Day 5: 9:00 p.m. – 10:00 p.m."	Jon Cassar	David Ehrman	March 27, 2006	5AFF15	14.50
As Hayes prepares the truth serum for Raines, Bauer arrives and is informed that Raines previously had a one-night stand with Cummings, which supports the claim that she is involved in the plot. Bauer convinces Hayes to let him talk to Raines first, but she denies the accusation and claims to be innocent. Bauer believes her and tries to free her by himself, but gets tazed and moved away, and an agent starts using the truth serum on her. With O'Brian's help, Bauer proves that Stenger has other connections with Henderson, which she has not revealed. This annuls the deal, giving Bauer the chance to interrogate Stenger, who is forced to confess Raines' innocence. Stenger reveals that she sold the schematics of a gas distribution center, and after CTU locates the company, Bauer leads a team there, where it is revealed that Bierko's plan is to release a large number of the canisters into the gas pipes, which would kill hundreds of thousands of people. CTU stops the plan, while Bauer and Bierko engage in a confrontation as the center is engulfed in multiple explosions. Meanwhile, Wayne is rescued and transported by Pierce.
112	16	"Day 5: 10:00 p.m. – 11:00 p.m."	Jon Cassar	Manny Coto & Sam Montgomery	April 3, 2006	5AFF16	12.47
After the explosions are cleared, Bauer and Bierko come out unharmed, and Bierko is arrested, while Hayes is ordered to absorb CTU as planned in the first place. Her assistant, Miles Papazian, advises her to find someone to testify against Buchanan so that he can be fired, and try to convince Raines, who initially refuses. Wayne reveals to Pierce that David's source in the government was Martha's assistant Evelyn, who tells the two men that her daughter, Amy, was taken hostage by Henderson. Wayne enlists the help of Bauer, who informs Raines, and she agrees to sign the testimony with the condition that O'Brian is kept temporarily, and Buchanan is fired as a result. Raines secretly informs O'Brian of the situation and tasks her to provide satellite support for Bauer; he joins Wayne near the location where Evelyn is to meet Henderson with the evidence she has of who in the White House was behind Palmer's assassination. Bauer and Wayne infiltrate the compound, killing most of Henderson's operatives and saving Amy, but Henderson escapes, wounding Evelyn, who ultimately reveals the evidence. The political figure is revealed to be none other than President Logan.
113	17	"Day 5: 11:00 p.m. – 12:00 a.m."	Brad Turner	David Fury	April 10, 2006	5AFF17	12.49
Bauer informs his secret teammates, including Pierce, about President Logan, and he and Wayne drop Evelyn and Amy off at a motel before heading to recover a recording that proves Logan's involvement. The two men break in a house and take hostage a man who works at the bank keeping the deposit box containing the tape. On Bauer's advice, Raines calls Secretary James Heller and arranges a meeting. The trio arrives at the bank and recovers the tape, but when they head out, they are attacked by Henderson and his men, who found the location by interrogating Evelyn. The Army arrives and intervenes in the shootout, giving Bauer and Wayne the chance to escape. Meanwhile, Raines leaves CTU with a tracker by Hayes, who knows that Raines is working secretly with Bauer; Hayes and the others are not aware of Logan's involvement. Raines removes the tracker and arrives at the airport where Heller will land, and Papazian and Hayes realize that O'Brian is aiding Bauer.
114	18	"Day 5: 12:00 a.m. – 1:00 a.m."	Brad Turner	Howard Gordon	April 17, 2006	5AFF18	13.26
Bauer arrives with Wayne at Buchanan's house and informs him of the situation. Buchanan takes Wayne to safety while Bauer heads to the airport with the tape, playing it to Heller and giving it to him, asking him to contact the Attorney General for President Logan's arrest. Instead, Heller locks down Bauer and Raines, revealing that he intends to blackmail Charles with the recording to make him resign without prosecution, as he believes the disclosure of Logan's involvement will become a political scandal for the nation. As Heller arrives at the retreat and offers his deal to Charles, Henderson and his men attack the airport, during which Bauer recovers the recording, but surrenders it to Henderson when Raines is taken hostage. Henderson critically wounds her and escapes before informing Logan, who expels Heller from the retreat, demanding his resignation. Meanwhile, Charles tasks the Army instead of CTU to find Bauer, while O'Brian escapes CTU and continues aiding Bauer from Buchanan's. Pierce arranges a secret meeting with Martha to tell her the truth before he is suddenly abducted.
115	19	"Day 5: 1:00 a.m. – 2:00 a.m."	Dwight Little	Steven Long Mitchell & Craig Van Sickle	April 24, 2006	5AFF19	13.04
As Henderson decides to keep the tape instead of destroying it, O'Brian traces his whereabouts and Bauer captures him, but does not find the tape on him. Henderson reveals that there is a helicopter following Heller's car which will be destroyed if he is not released. They inform Heller, who decides to sacrifice himself in order not to have Henderson released, and Heller drives his car into a river in order to avoid the helicopter. O'Brian finds an airstrip on Henderson's route and deduces that he must have entrusted the tape to someone there. Bauer leaves for the airstrip while Raines guards Henderson until Manning and his team can arrive, and Bauer manages to infiltrate the plane that is about to take off. Meanwhile, Henderson's operatives arrive to free him before being neutralized by Manning's team, who arrest Henderson. Hayes begins to believe in the accusation of Logan and warns O'Brian to leave Buchanan's before DHS agents can arrive. Martha is locked in her room by a Secret Service agent, while Logan is forced to reluctantly reveal the truth to his horrified wife.
116	20	"Day 5: 2:00 a.m. – 3:00 a.m."	Dwight Little	Joel Surnow & Michael Loceff	May 1, 2006	5AFF20	13.15
Bauer finds the Air Marshal using O'Brian's help and knocks him unconscious, while O'Brian identifies the potential associate, and Bauer abducts him and takes him to the maintenance room below to interrogate him, but he denies any knowledge. An attendant awakens the Marshal, who orders the pilot to pump out the air of the room below in order to force Bauer to surrender. Bauer accesses the control panel of the plane and diverts its course to crash, forcing the pilot to reverse the pump and open the hatch of the room. Bauer secures the Marshal, and O'Brian uncovers the co-pilot as the actual associate. The co-pilot kills the pilot before Bauer arrives and secures him, recovering the tape and informing CTU. Charles' unknown co-conspirator advises him to shoot down the plane in order to avoid the disclosure and his prosecution. Meanwhile, DHS agents arrest Buchanan, and Hayes orders them to bring him to CTU instead of interrogation on site, slowing down the investigation in order to aid O'Brian, who continues her work at a bar, though Papazian begins to suspect Hayes.
117	21	"Day 5: 3:00 a.m. – 4:00 a.m."	Brad Turner	Manny Coto	May 8, 2006	5AFF21	13.86
Raines is informed that Heller has survived the crash, while President Logan's associate reveals that a technical distress signal has been sent to the Air Force that can justify the shoot-down. Logan is soon notified of the signal, which indicates that Bauer might be targeting populated civilized regions or even the retreat, and thus, the Air Force requests authorization to shoot down the plane, which he grants. Bauer orders the co-pilot to land the plane on the highway, and the Air Force informs Logan that the threat is gone now that Bauer is trying to land, forcing Charles to abort the shoot-down, but orders the Army to arrest Bauer. Manning and his team arrive and secretly extract Bauer from the perimeter without the Army noticing, and Bauer arrives at CTU with the tape. Hayes and Buchanan prepare a conference with the Attorney General, and she informs Papazian, who gets angry for not being told earlier. Logan and his associate mutually agree that suicide is the better option rather than facing a long and shameful trial. As Logan prepares, he gets a call from Papazian, who makes a deal to destroy the tape in exchange for a better job.
118	22	"Day 5: 4:00 a.m. – 5:00 a.m."	Brad Turner	David Fury & Sam Montgomery	May 15, 2006	5AFF22	13.16
During transfer, Bierko is rescued by his operatives, and it is revealed that Bierko has saved one of the canisters, which he believes to be enough for his plan. O'Brian finds the tape empty, and Bauer and Hayes confront Papazian, realizing he destroyed the tape, and after getting told off by Hayes, Papazian gets transferred to another organization on Logan's order. As CTU is notified of Bierko, Bauer offers Henderson immunity in exchange for helping stop Bierko, and Henderson demands disappearing like Bauer did, since the people he worked for are too dangerous to be stopped by immunity. Bauer apparently agrees, and Henderson takes the team to a location where an associate resides. Henderson enters alone and alerts the associate, who is killed by CTU, though Henderson claims that was part of his plan, but Bauer ruined it because of his suspicions. CTU finds the target to be a Russian submarine, which is in Los Angeles as a result of the treaty. Bierko's men releases the canister at the submarine, killing almost everyone on board, before entering the submarine and preparing to fire missiles on the city. Meanwhile, Martha saves Pierce from an agent ordered by Logan to kill him, and Pierce advises her to enlist the help of Novick.
119	23	"Day 5: 5:00 a.m. – 6:00 a.m."	Jon Cassar	Howard Gordon & Evan Katz	May 22, 2006	5AFF23	13.75
The CTU team and Henderson arrive at the submarine, and enlist the help of an engineer inside to open the hatch and enter. A shootout starts and all of Bierko's men are killed while Henderson manages to stop the launch. After Bauer kills Bierko, Henderson tries to escape, but Bauer stops him, holds him responsible for the deaths of his friends, and fatally shoots him, before secretly telling Chloe that he is going after President Logan now. Meanwhile, Pierce and Martha reveal the truth to Novick, and Bauer meets Pierce outside the retreat with a plan to abduct Logan on his way to David's funeral. Martha is tasked with seducing Charles in the bedroom in order to delay him, so that Bauer and Pierce can proceed with the plan, while Bauer tells Novick that he intends to do anything to force Logan to confess. Meanwhile, O'Brian brings her former husband, Morris, who previously worked at CTU, and tasks him with modifying a hearing device.
120	24	"Day 5: 6:00 a.m. – 7:00 a.m."	Jon Cassar	Robert Cochran	May 22, 2006	5AFF24	13.75
Bauer knocks a helicopter pilot unconscious and wears his uniform, entering the chopper set to transport President Logan. After Logan finishes with Martha, he enters the helicopter with two Secret Service agents. On the way, Bauer knocks the other pilot and the agents unconscious before capturing Logan and taking him to a warehouse. Morris arrives and gives the necessary tools to Bauer before leaving. Bauer starts recording a video of Charles, who refuses to confess anything as agents eventually arrive and Bauer surrenders to them. Logan heads to the funeral, where he takes Martha to a secluded place and confronts her for playing with him, meanwhile confessing to his involvement in David's assassination and the day's attacks, which is recorded by the device planted in his pen. O'Brian plays the audio file to the Attorney General, who has Logan arrested in front of a large crowd. Hayes decides not to absorb CTU and gets closer with Buchanan. As Bauer is about to leave peacefully with Raines, he is suddenly abducted by operatives of Cheng Zhi, who reminds him of his attack on the Chinese consulate. Bauer asks Cheng to kill him, but Cheng states that he is too valuable to be killed, while it is revealed that they're on a freighter bound for China.

== Production ==
A 10-minute prequel to the season was available with the fourth season DVD. The prequel, which takes place one year after Day 4, shows Jack and Chloe meeting in Chicago, Illinois. Based on computer intrusion that happened when Chloe accessed Jack's autopsy report, she expresses concern that others might know Jack is still alive. This is confirmed when he tries to leave the meeting place and gets chased by agents in a black car. It was broadcast on Sky One in the United Kingdom before the showing of the fifth season.

=== Trailer ===
The trailer for the fifth season recapped the Season 4 ending and emphasized that the show would be continuously aired. Many scenes shown were from the Season 5 premiere but a scene that shows an aerial view of Jack Bauer was unique to the trailer. Such a scene would not have been used in the show because the camera department prefers to shoot all scenes at eye level.

=== Deaths ===
This season is notable for the high number of major characters killed off. Significant deaths included David Palmer, Michelle Dessler, Edgar Stiles, and Tony Almeida, although the latter's death was retconned in the seventh season. Actor Dennis Haysbert was against the killing of David Palmer and refused to film the scene. He relented after a meeting with the showrunner, though he still disapproved of the storyline. Spoilers released by Ain't It Cool News revealed that two major characters including a politician would die in the premiere episode. Guest characters who died were Walt Cummings and Lynn McGill. The life of Aaron Pierce was threatened, but Martha Logan helped save him.

== Reception ==
On Rotten Tomatoes, the season has an approval rating of 100% with an average score of 8.8 out of 10 based on 22 reviews. The website's critical consensus reads, "24 defies the law of diminishing returns with a spectacular fifth season that features White House intrigue, some of the most harrowing set-pieces in the series yet, and a heroically committed performance by Kiefer Sutherland."

"7:00 a.m. – 8:00 a.m." was the most watched episode and premiere in 24's history. Reviews of "7:00 a.m. – 8:00 a.m." were almost universally positive, with a score of 89/100 from Metacritic. In a positive light The Hollywood Reporter called the episode, "heart-pounding, mesmerizing adventure unlike anything else up or down the dial." while praising the new and returning actors. likewise USA Today gave the episode a positive review, and praised Kiefer Sutherland, who portrayed Jack Bauer.

The New York Times also reacted positively, saying, "all the villains, be they Islamic fundamentalists, drug smugglers, American oil brokers or Russian separatists, keep picking Los Angeles as a target for attack." The Boston Globe praised the returning performances and strong plot. Season five of 24 was nominated for twelve Primetime Emmy Awards, becoming the most nominated series.

=== Award nominations ===
Organization	Category	Nominee(s)	Result
Primetime Emmy Awards	Outstanding Drama Series	Jon Cassar, Robert Cochran, Manny Coto, David Fury, Howard Gordon, Brian Grazer, Michael Klick, Evan Katz, Stephen Kronish, Michael Loceff, Joel Surnow, Kiefer Sutherland, Brad Turner	Won
Primetime Emmy Awards	Outstanding Lead Actor in a Drama Series	Kiefer Sutherland	Won
Primetime Emmy Awards	Outstanding Directing for a Drama Series	Jon Cassar	Won
Primetime Emmy Awards	Outstanding Music Composition for a Series (Dramatic Underscore)	Sean Callery	Won
Primetime Emmy Awards	Outstanding Single-Camera Picture Editing for a Series	David Latham	Won
Primetime Emmy Awards	Outstanding Single-Camera Picture Editing for a Series	Scott Powell	Nominated
Primetime Emmy Awards	Outstanding Supporting Actor in a Drama Series	Gregory Itzin	Nominated
Primetime Emmy Awards	Outstanding Supporting Actress in a Drama Series	Jean Smart	Nominated
Primetime Emmy Awards	Outstanding Stunt Coordination	Jeff Cadiente	Nominated
Primetime Emmy Awards	Outstanding Cinematography for a Single-Camera Series	Rodney Charters	Nominated
Primetime Emmy Awards	Outstanding Single-Camera Sound Mixing for a Series	William Gocke, Mike Olman, Ken Kobett	Nominated
Primetime Emmy Awards	Outstanding Sound Editing for a Series	William Dotson, Cathie Speakman, Pembrooke Andrews, Jeffrey Whitcher, Shawn Kennelly, Jeff Charbonneau, Laura Macias, Vince Nicastro, Rich Polanco	Nominated
Golden Globe Awards	Best Drama Series		Nominated
Golden Globe Awards	Best Actor in a Drama Series	Kiefer Sutherland	Nominated
Screen Actors Guild Awards	Outstanding Performance by a Male Actor in a Drama Series	Kiefer Sutherland	Nominated
Screen Actors Guild Awards	Outstanding Performance by an Ensemble in a Drama Series	Jayne Atkinson, Jude Ciccolella, Roger Cross, Gregory Itzin, Louis Lombardi, James Morrison, Glenn Morshower, Mary Lynn Rajskub, Kim Raver, Jean Smart, Kiefer Sutherland	Nominated
Satellite Awards	Best Drama Series		Nominated
Satellite Awards	Best Supporting Actress	Jean Smart	Nominated
Directors Guild of America Awards	Best Directing for a Drama Series	Jon Cassar	Won
Writers Guild of America Awards	Dramatic Series	Robert Cochran, Manny Coto, Duppy Demetrius, David Ehrman, David Fury, Howard Gordon, Evan Katz, Stephen Kronish, Michael Loceff, Matt Michnovetz, Steve Long Mitchell, Sam Montgomery, Nicole Ranadive, Joel Surnow, Craig Van Sickle	Nominated
Producers Guild of America Awards	Television Producer of the Year Award in Episodic – Drama	Joel Surnow, Robert Cochran, Howard Gordon, Brian Grazer, Evan Katz, Jon Cassar, Stephen Kronish, Michael Loceff	Nominated
Television Critics Association Awards	Best Program of the Year		Nominated
Television Critics Association Awards	Individual Achievement in Drama	Kiefer Sutherland	Nominated
Television Critics Association Awards	Outstanding Achievement in Drama		Nominated

== Home media releases ==
The fifth season was released on DVD in region 1 on December 5, 2006 and in region 2 on November 6, 2006.
