= 24 season 6 =

24
- Season 6
- Promotional poster
- Starring: Kiefer Sutherland; Mary Lynn Rajskub; D. B. Woodside; James Morrison; Peter MacNicol; Jayne Atkinson; Carlo Rota; Eric Balfour; Marisol Nichols; Regina King
- No. of episodes: 24

Release
- Original network: Fox
- Original release: January 14 – May 21, 2007

Season chronology
- ← Previous; Season 5 Next → 24: Redemption; Season 7

The sixth season of the American drama television series 24, also known as Day 6, premiered in the United States on Fox on January 14, 2007, and concluded on May 21, 2007. The season's storyline begins and ends at 6:00 a.m. It is set 20 months after the events of the previous season.

== Season overview ==
The sixth season is set 20 months after season five. Over the last 11 weeks before Day 6, the United States has been targeted coast-to-coast in a series of suicide bombings. A man named Abu Fayed agrees to give the U.S. the location of Hamri Al-Assad, the supposed terrorist mastermind of these attacks, in exchange for former CTU Agent Jack Bauer with whom he has a personal grudge. As a result, President Wayne Palmer has negotiated the release of Bauer, who was illegally captured by Chinese government agents, under "high-price" terms.

Season 6 can be divided into two main acts:

1. Jack is released from the Chinese prison, and works with CTU to take down suitcase nuke-armed terrorists, and discovers links to his own family in the process.
2. After the nukes are recovered, the Chinese manipulate Jack into giving them one of the circuit boards, elevating tensions between the United States and Russia.

=== Major subplots ===
- Karen Hayes clashes with Tom Lennox over the ethics of suspending civil liberties for Muslim Americans.
- Corrupt members of Wayne Palmer's administration attempt to have him killed so that they can take more extreme measures to find the nukes.
- Jack discovers that his father and brother both conspired with Charles Logan during the nerve gas crisis.
- Milo Pressman develops feelings for his boss Nadia Yassir and becomes alarmed at the way CTU agent Mike Doyle treats her.
- Morris O'Brian struggles with the guilt he feels over giving Fayed a working detonator and almost relapses into alcoholism.
- Jack becomes attached to his nephew Josh and insists that losing him as collateral damage is not acceptable.
- Jack struggles with the fact that Audrey has been tortured by the Chinese and will need long term care.

=== Summary ===
Agent Bauer, having been taken prisoner by China 20 months earlier, is released under a deal arranged by President Wayne Palmer. Jack is immediately asked to sacrifice himself to Abu Fayed, who has offered CTU Hamri Al-Assad, who is believed to be the terrorist mastermind behind the suicide bombings of the last 11 weeks. Jack finds out, however, that Assad is actually trying to stop the attacks, which were orchestrated by Fayed. Jack escapes and saves Assad, which requires him to kill Curtis Manning who is bent on revenge for an earlier incident. Having found out that Fayed is planning to detonate five suitcase nuclear bombs, CTU agents attempt to retrieve one of them but they are too late. While crying over the loss of his friend Curtis, Jack watches in horror as a nuclear blast destroys Valencia.

Jack discovers that his father Phillip and brother Graem are working against CTU and have been for some time. This reunites Jack with his nephew Josh Bauer and sister-in-law Marilyn Bauer who tells him that Audrey Raines is dead. Morris O'Brian is lured out of CTU, captured by Fayed and forced to arm the remaining nuclear bombs. After defusing one of them, Jack is aided by former president Charles Logan. Logan claims that his connection with the Russian Consulate General, Anatoly Markov can help Jack find Dmitri Gredenko, a former Russian general planning to arm RQ-2 Aerial Drones with the bombs to attack the U.S. Dissatisfied with Wayne Palmer's leadership during the crisis, Reed Pollock and a co-conspirator named Carson plan to assassinate Palmer and frame Al-Assad for it. Before Tom Lennox can prevent the attack, their bomb explodes, killing Assad and leaving Palmer in critical condition.

Vice President Noah Daniels assumes executive powers and threatens retaliation. Logan fails to blackmail Markov into giving up Gredenko, so Jack breaks into the Russian Consulate and tortures information out of him. President Logan convinces his ex-wife Martha to call the Russian First Lady, Anya Suvarov. As a result, Yuri Suvarov authorizes action against the consulate by a CTU team (led by new Director of Field Operations Mike Doyle). Jack immediately gives CTU Gredenko's location, but it is too late, as Gredenko has already launched a drone toward San Francisco. Jack manages to locate the drone's pilot and crash land the drone, but radiation is released during the crash. Noah Daniels authorizes a nuclear strike against the Middle-East, but Wayne Palmer is brought out of his coma to intervene.

Gredenko is captured by CTU and he agrees to help bring in Fayed in exchange for amnesty, but warns Fayed instead. Gredenko dies and Jack manages to track down Fayed. After a struggle, Jack single-handedly kills Fayed and finds the two remaining bombs. Jack then receives a phone call from Audrey, who is apparently still alive and is then turned over to Cheng Zhi. Cheng demands a Russian circuit board from one of the nukes, information that could start a war, in exchange for Audrey's freedom. President Palmer reluctantly authorizes Jack's plan but collapses during a press conference, allowing Daniels to assume executive duties and reverse the order. Jack goes rogue and goes through with the exchange, learning that Audrey has endured pharmaceutical torture. His plan to destroy the board fails and Cheng gets hold of it.

Russia discovers that the Chinese have the circuit board and threatens military action. Cheng discovers that the board has been damaged and calls Phillip Bauer to fix it. Jack gets a lead from Audrey about Cheng's location but before they can use it, CTU is infiltrated by Chinese mercenaries, led by Zhou, and most members of CTU are taken hostage. Milo is fatally shot when he steps up to protect Nadia. Jack Bauer, Mike Doyle and others are able to kill the mercenaries and they learn that one of Phillip Bauer's conditions for helping the Chinese was that his grandson Josh be delivered to him. Phillip Bauer calls the White House and offers to give the circuit board for Josh, and they agree. Doyle takes Josh from Jack to go ahead with the exchange.

Jack finds out about the deal and gets help from Bill Buchanan, who had been fired from CTU earlier after the Department of Justice needed a fall guy for the escape of Abu Fayed. The exchange fails as Jack predicted and Phillip Bauer manages to capture Josh on an offshore oil rig while still in possession of the circuit board. Daniels decides to launch an air strike against the oil rig but Jack and Bill commandeer a helicopter in order to save Josh. They arrive in time to kill Cheng's men, capture Cheng alive and rescue Josh. Phillip Bauer dies in the subsequent airstrike. Jack confronts and lashes out at Audrey's father, James Heller, who holds Jack responsible for Audrey's torture. While Heller apologizes and acknowledges he was unfair to Jack, he convinces Jack that Audrey would be safer without him. Jack tells a sleeping Audrey that even though he loves her, he must let her go for her own sake. He walks outside to a cliff and stares off at the ocean at an uncertain future.

== Characters ==
Season 6 main cast: (from left to right) Eric Balfour, Marisol Nichols, Carlo Rota, James Morrison, Mary Lynn Rajskub, Kiefer Sutherland, Jayne Atkinson, Peter MacNicol, Regina King, and D. B. Woodside

=== Starring ===
- Kiefer Sutherland as Jack Bauer (24 episodes)
- Mary Lynn Rajskub as Chloe O'Brian (24 episodes)
- D. B. Woodside as President Wayne Palmer (17 episodes)
- James Morrison as Bill Buchanan (21 episodes)
- Peter MacNicol as Tom Lennox (24 episodes)
- Jayne Atkinson as Karen Hayes (18 episodes)
- Carlo Rota as Morris O'Brian (24 episodes)
- Eric Balfour as Milo Pressman (19 episodes)
- Marisol Nichols as Nadia Yassir (24 episodes)
- Regina King as Sandra Palmer (9 episodes)

=== Special guest stars ===
- Powers Boothe as Vice President Noah Daniels (14 episodes)
- James Cromwell as Phillip Bauer (8 episodes)
- Kim Raver as Audrey Raines (5 episodes)
- Gregory Itzin as Charles Logan (4 episodes)
- William Devane as James Heller (2 episodes)
- Jean Smart as Martha Logan (1 episode)

=== Guest starring ===
- Adoni Maropis as Abu Fayed (16 episodes)
- Ricky Schroder as Mike Doyle (12 episodes)
- Rena Sofer as Marilyn Bauer (12 episodes)
- Evan Ellingson as Josh Bauer (10 episodes)
- Kari Matchett as Lisa Miller (10 episodes)
- Tzi Ma as Cheng Zhi (9 episodes)
- Chad Lowe as Reed Pollock (8 episodes)
- Rade Šerbedžija as Dmitri Gredenko (8 episodes)
- Alexander Siddig as Hamri Al-Assad (7 episodes)
- Jim Holmes as Dr. Arthur Welton (6 episodes)
- Nick Jameson as Russian President Yuri Suvarov (6 episodes)
- Harry Lennix as Walid Al-Rezani (6 episodes)
- Ryan Cutrona as Admiral John Smith (5 episodes)
- Michael Angarano as Scott Wallace (4 episodes)
- Roger Cross as Curtis Manning (4 episodes)
- David Hunt as Darren McCarthy (4 episodes)
- Ajay Mehta as the Middle Eastern Ambassador (4 episodes)
- Kal Penn as Ahmed Amar (4 episodes)
- Bob Gunton as Secretary of Defense Ethan Kanin (3 episodes)
- Paul McCrane as Graem Bauer (3 episodes)
- Michael Shanks as Mark Bishop (3 episodes)
- Shaun Majumder as Hassan Numair (2 episodes)
- John Noble as Anatoly Markov (2 episodes)
- Ian Anthony Dale as Zhou Yong (2 episodes)
- Kathleen Gati as Russian First Lady Anya Suvarov (1 episode)
- Glenn Morshower as Aaron Pierce (1 episode)

== Episodes ==
No. overall	No. in season	Title	Directed by	Written by	Original release date	Prod. code	US viewers (millions)
121	1	"Day 6: 6:00 a.m. – 7:00 a.m."	Jon Cassar	Howard Gordon	January 14, 2007	6AFF01	15.79
20 months after the events of Day 5, U.S. cities have been the targets of terrorist attacks for weeks, and Jack Bauer is delivered by Cheng Zhi to CTU as the result of an agreement between the two governments. CTU Director Bill Buchanan tells Bauer that a known terrorist named Hamri Al-Assad is believed to be responsible for the attacks, and a rogue operative named Abu Fayed has demanded Bauer in exchange for giving Assad's location, while it is revealed that Fayed's brother died while being tortured by Bauer years ago. Having spent 20 months in a Chinese prison and having lost the will to go on, Bauer agrees without resistance, while President Wayne Palmer talks to Bauer on the phone and expresses his gratitude. Fayed takes Bauer and gives Assad's location to CTU, while Bauer memorizes the coordinates, but Fayed suddenly starts torturing him and reveals that he is the person behind the attacks, and that Assad has actually come to stop him. Learning this causes Bauer to regain some of his edge, and he fights off his captors and manages to escape. Meanwhile, a debate at the White House ensues between Tom Lennox, the Chief of Staff, and Karen Hayes, Palmer's national security advisor and Buchanan's wife, on how to treat Muslim Americans in order to stop the attacks, while at a neighboring street, Ray Wallace saves Ahmed Amar, a Middle-Eastern neighbor, from local assailants, though Amar is revealed to be working for Fayed.
122	2	"Day 6: 7:00 a.m. – 8:00 a.m."	Jon Cassar	Manny Coto	January 14, 2007	6AFF02	15.79
Bauer contacts Wayne and shares his knowledge of Fayed being the true mastermind, but Hayes and Lennox do not believe him, and Wayne decides to continue with his plan to neutralize Assad. Bauer heads to the location alone and warns Assad, who finds Fayed's spy among his operatives and captures him, just as Army helicopters shoot the house, but Bauer, Assad and the spy survive the attack. They hide in an empty house, where Bauer attempts to torture the spy, but hesitates in continuing; Assad ultimately tortures the spy and finds the next target before killing him, and Bauer and Assad head to the location, which is a subway station, where Bauer picks out the bomber, and Assad chases the bomber's handler. Inside the train, Bauer catches the bomber and engages in a fight with him, managing to throw the bomber outside the train before he detonates his suicide vest, and these events cause Wayne to realize that Bauer was right about Fayed and Assad. Meanwhile, Amar is attacked again by locals, and Scott, Ray's son and Amar's friend, intervenes before Amar kills the assailants and shows hostility towards Scott, taking him hostage. Elsewhere, the FBI arrives at an Islamic American community organization and starts investigating the records, while Sandra, Wayne's sister and the community's lawyer, deletes the records and as a result, she is arrested along with the organization's director Walid Al-Rezani.
123	3	"Day 6: 8:00 a.m. – 9:00 a.m."	Brad Turner	Evan Katz & David Fury	January 15, 2007	6AFF03	15.73
Bauer stages an intentional car crash with the handler, damaging the handler's car, allowing Assad to arrive and offer the handler a ride, which he accepts. Bauer then contacts CTU and tasks them to track Assad's car in order to reach Fayed, who calls Wayne and demands the transfer of dozens of inmates of a specific prison, and Wayne orders the process, while CTU agent Curtis Manning questions Wayne's decision to ally with Assad, believing his past actions to be unforgivable. The handler separates from Assad, who joins Bauer and other agents as they find him at a self-storage warehouse, but the handler spots them and commits suicide with a grenade, which almost completely destroys his laptop. CTU manages to recover the identity of the associate Hasan Numair, who is one of the prisoners scheduled for transfer, and Numair manages to escape with the help of a guard, while Assad reveals that Numair is a nuclear engineer, and CTU deduces that Fayed is planning a nuclear attack. Meanwhile, Amar takes Scott and his mother hostage, forcing Ray to go to an electronics store and acquire a device, where he ends up beating a man to death to gain the device, while the FBI brings Sandra and Rezani to a detention facility, but then frees Sandra on Wayne's order.
124	4	"Day 6: 9:00 a.m. – 10:00 a.m."	Brad Turner	Robert Cochran	January 15, 2007	6AFF04	15.73
Ray calls Amar and demands that he release one of his family members, and Amar releases Jillian, Ray's wife, who then calls and informs CTU. Bauer deduces that Manning has a personal grudge against Assad and tasks CTU agent Chloe O'Brian to investigate it. Bauer leads the team to the Wallaces' house, where Amar, who was about to kill Scott under Fayed's order, is fatally shot after a brief but intense confrontation. Scott recalls the location that Amar had mentioned, which is in Valencia, and CTU sends a team to the location, where Numair starts preparing the nuclear bomb with the device Ray has brought. O'Brian reveals to Bauer that when Manning served in the Army after Desert Storm, Assad killed Manning's soldiers in a live broadcast. Refusing to accept the fact that Assad can change his ways, Manning tries to kill him before being held at gunpoint by Bauer, and when Manning refuses to back down, Bauer is forced to shoot Manning to protect Assad. Manning dies, with Bauer showing heartbreak at his action and telling Buchanan on the phone that he doesn't want to be involved with this situation anymore, just as CTU agents storm into the Valencia facility, but Numair explodes the bomb, killing himself, Ray and thousands of other people nearby. Meanwhile, at the detention facility, Rezani detects a message, which CTU interprets as there being four more bombs.
125	5	"Day 6: 10:00 a.m. – 11:00 a.m."	Milan Cheylov	Joel Surnow & Michael Loceff	January 22, 2007	6AFF05	14.47
In the aftermath of the explosion, Wayne and his staff are moved to the bunker, and Bauer immediately regains his composure upon seeing the explosion and starts helping people in trouble, while CTU checks the records of a Russian associate named Dmitri Gredenko, and finds the name of Phillip Bauer, Jack's father. Buchanan informs Jack, who reveals that he has not talked to Phillip for years, but convinces Buchanan to let him investigate Phillip alone. Jack's brother, Graem, who is revealed to have been Charles Logan's co-conspirator during the events of Day 5, finds out about Jack's investigation before he gets a call from his brother, who tasks him to find Phillip and then pays a surprise visit to Graem at his house, where he meets Graem's son, Josh, and wife, Marilyn, with whom Jack was previously involved. Jack and Graem go to his working room, where Jack locks the door and fully regains his spark, torturing Graem for information. Meanwhile, with Numair gone, Fayed convinces his associate Darren McCarthy to find a new engineer, while at the detention facility, Rezani is welcomed into a group of inmates with the help of the agents.
126	6	"Day 6: 11:00 a.m. – 12:00 p.m."	Milan Cheylov	Joel Surnow & Michael Loceff	January 29, 2007	6AFF06	14.04
After being tortured, Graem states that he made a mistake by dealing with Gredenko, and Phillip got involved trying to fix it, so Jack and Graem head to the family company, where Jack encounters Phillip and convinces him to let CTU investigate the case and stop the upcoming attacks. However, Phillip's mercenaries who came with him are revealed to be loyal to Graem, who takes Jack and Phillip captive and orders his men to take the duo to a secluded place and kill them. Meanwhile, as Hayes continues to question Lennox's restrictive measures on the Muslims, Lennox tasks Reed Pollock, his deputy, to find something to blackmail Hayes into resignation, and Pollock finds evidence that Buchanan had Fayed in custody months ago. Since Buchanan could be blamed for the day's attack, Lennox convinces Hayes to resign quietly for the good of Buchanan. At the detention facility, Rezani steals a cell phone an inmate secretly carries and the FBI gives the call record to O'Brian, who finds out that those inmates are not associated with Fayed, and Rezani ends up being beaten by the inmates for spying before he is rescued by the guards.
127	7	"Day 6: 12:00 p.m. – 1:00 p.m."	Jon Cassar	Howard Gordon & Manny Coto	February 5, 2007	6AFF07	13.60
Jack and Phillip manage to take down Graem's mercenaries and free themselves, and after Jack alerts CTU of what has happened, Graem is ultimately arrested in his house, where he is tortured with hyoscine pentothal, a serum that causes agonizing nerve pain. Marilyn reveals to Jack that she knew of Graem's illegal activities, but stayed silent because of Josh. Amidst the torture, Graem reveals his involvement in the events of Day 5, enraging Jack to the point that he orders excessive serum to be injected, which traumatizes Graem. Afterwards, Phillip has a secret talk with Graem, and it is revealed that Phillip was involved in the events of Day 5 and his association with Gredenko is much more than what is believed. Desiring to cover up his involvement with these events, and believing that Graem will likely expose his involvement, Phillip kills Graem and makes his death appear to be as a result of the injections. Meanwhile, CTU intercepts the message between Fayed and McCarthy, and starts decrypting it, while agent Morris O'Brian, Chloe's ex-husband, gets a call to visit his brother in a hospital, but as he leaves, he is revealed to be McCarthy's proposed engineer, and McCarthy and Rita Brady, his girlfriend, successfully abduct Morris. Lennox apparently convinces Wayne to approve his project, and Wayne convenes the Cabinet, only to reveal that he will not sign it, and remains firm in his decision over the objections of Vice President Noah Daniels.
128	8	"Day 6: 1:00 p.m. – 2:00 p.m."	Jon Cassar	Evan Katz & David Fury	February 12, 2007	6AFF08	13.12
Lennox gets angry with Wayne's decision, and Pollock secretly offers him a plan to assassinate Wayne so that Daniels, a proponent, can ascend, but Lennox initially denies it and tasks Pollock to type a resignation paper for him. Phillip, Marilyn and Josh are brought to CTU as Jack leads a team to rescue Morris, while Brady kills McCarthy and takes Morris to Fayed alone. Instead of paying her, Fayed kills Brady and starts torturing Morris to make him activate the bombs, and Morris finally cracks and performs the deed. Jack's team storms in and saves Morris while eliminating his captors in a shootout, but find Fayed is gone and one armed bomb is left behind, though Jack manages to defuse it. Morris reveals that the other bombs are now functional, and when Lennox hears the news, he decides to hear Pollock's offer instead of resigning. Meanwhile, Assad is transferred to Washington, D.C. and brought to Wayne, who offers Assad a peace initiative proposed on a live broadcast, with Wayne believing that Assad can dissuade some of Fayed's followers.
129	9	"Day 6: 2:00 p.m. – 3:00 p.m."	Brad Turner	Adam E. Fierro	February 12, 2007	6AFF09	13.73
Gredenko is revealed to be preparing the delivery mechanism for the bombs, while Marilyn tells Jack that she remembers an address that is associated with Graem's, and possibly Gredenko's, activities. Marilyn also converses with Phillip, who is able to deduce Jack's plan to find Gredenko and formulates a plan, secretly tasking his operatives to find and kill Gredenko. He then abducts Josh and takes him to a hotel, before calling Marilyn and forcing her to give Jack a decoy address. Jack enters the location with his team, but finds a bomb inside and runs out, managing to survive the explosion. Marilyn and agent Milo Pressman attempt to flee on a truck but are attacked by Phillip's operatives, causing them to crash, and the duo continue on foot while the operatives give chase. Meanwhile, a rescued Morris is returned to CTU before he becomes depressed for helping Fayed with activating the bombs, pushing Chloe away. Lennox secretly meets Pollock, who reveals that there are other people, but not including Daniels, that support the plan, and Lennox expresses his approval and starts gathering the necessary tools and information.
130	10	"Day 6: 3:00 p.m. – 4:00 p.m."	Brad Turner	Howard Gordon & Evan Katz	February 19, 2007	6AFF10	13.05
Jack arrives and saves Milo and Marilyn from Phillip's operatives, arresting the head operative, before confronting Marilyn for lying to him about the address, and she reveals the truth about Phillip's abduction of her son. She gives him the real address, and CTU sends a team to that location, but they find the house to be empty. In order to find Phillip, Jack forces the operative to tell Phillip on the phone that he has captured Marilyn, but she wants to see her son before she gives him Gredenko's address. Phillip gives his location, and Jack and Marilyn head there and enter the empty hotel, where Phillip calls from the building across the street, and Jack offers himself in exchange for Josh, which Phillip accepts. After the exchange is made, Phillip tells Jack that he aided Gredenko because the latter had evidence that proved Phillip's involvement in the events of Day 5. Phillip ultimately spares his son's life and leaves a cell phone with a phone number on it, and when Jack calls it, former president Charles Logan answers the call, revealing that he knows about the situation and offering help. Meanwhile, a guilt-ridden Morris drinks liquor while at work, and Milo informs Chloe of what has happened, but Morris convinces them that he will not do it again. Pollock's associate enters the bunker with the help of Lennox, who later changes his mind about approving Pollock's plan, not wanting a president to be assassinated, and decides to warn Secret Service, before Pollock suddenly appears and knocks him unconscious.
131	11	"Day 6: 4:00 p.m. – 5:00 p.m."	Tim Iacofano	Manny Coto	February 26, 2007	6AFF11	12.80
Jack calls Buchanan, who reveals that while Jack was gone for 20 months, Logan's trial was never made public, and Logan had instead made a deal to resign and go into house arrest. As Jack visits Logan, who offers to help without anything in return, Jack informs Wayne, who expresses his doubts, but eventually approves it. Logan reveals that the Russian consul, Anatoly Markov, is associated with Gredenko, and that he can convince Markov to talk, and they head to the consulate, while Gredenko's delivery devices are revealed to be drones. Meanwhile, Chloe becomes worried that Morris is still drinking and confronts him at several points, and Morris ultimately throws away the bottle he is keeping. Pollock locks Lennox in a room, where the associate arrives and prepares a bomb with the tools he has brought inside without detection, instructing Pollock as to how to detonate the bomb, which Pollock sets at the conference room just as Wayne and Assad are about to rehearse the live press conference in which Assad will officially propose a peace initiative. While Lennox makes an unsuccessful escape attempt, Assad detects the bomb while he is about to rehearse his speech, but is too late to warn everyone in time as Pollock detonates it, and the ensuing explosion critically wounds Wayne, while Assad is killed.
132	12	"Day 6: 5:00 p.m. – 6:00 p.m."	Tim Iacofano	Teleplay by : Evan Katz & David Fury; Story by : Howard Gordon	March 5, 2007	6AFF12	13.05
At the Russian consulate, Logan meets Markov and reveals that he has evidence that can incriminate Markov and will disclose it if he does not help CTU find the bombs, but Markov insists that he does not have any connection with Gredenko, and Logan leaves. After Logan states that Markov is lying, Jack decides to infiltrate the consulate and torture Markov despite Logan's attempts to dissuade him. Jack successfully infiltrates Markov's room and tortures him, learning from Markov that Gredenko is in Shadow Valley, but Jack is arrested by Russian guards before he can contact CTU. He manages to convince a Russian assistant to give the information to CTU, but the assistant is killed by an associate of Markov before he can make any calls. Meanwhile, in the aftermath of the explosion, Pollock apparently convinces Lennox not to reveal the truth behind the assassination attempt and frees him, only for Lennox to immediately reveal the truth to the Secret Service and is arrested along with a stunned Pollock and his associate. With Wayne critically wounded, Daniels assumes command and demands that Lennox announce that Assad was complicit in the assassination attempt by threatening to reveal Lennox's involvement to the Justice Department. As Hayes prepares to leave D.C., Buchanan calls and informs her of the attempt.
133	13	"Day 6: 6:00 p.m. – 7:00 p.m."	Jon Cassar	Joel Surnow & Michael Loceff	March 12, 2007	6AFF13	12.39
Agent Mike Doyle arrives from Division Command and takes over for Manning, setting his agents outside the consulate that Jack is trapped in, struggling to avoid Markov's associates. Charles states that his former wife, Martha, is friends with Russian president Yuri Suvarov's wife, before calling and informing Aaron Pierce, who has married Martha. Charles meets Pierce and Martha at their house, and an intense conversation between Charles and Martha ensues, with Charles attempting to convince Martha to call Suvarov's wife and Martha expressing complete displeasure towards Charles. Just as she finally decides to call Suvarov's wife, she critically stabs Charles, who is taken to the hospital. After Martha makes the call, Suvarov attempts to persuade Markov to free Jack from the consulate, but when Markov defies Suvarov's order, Suvarov realizes he is truly connected with Gredenko, and allows CTU to attack the consulate, starting a battle in which Markov is killed, while Jack finally gets the chance to inform CTU of Gredenko's whereabouts. Meanwhile, Daniels forces Lennox to tell the ambassador of Fayed and Assad's country that Assad was complicit, giving Daniels the opportunity to force that country to start cooperating with CTU to find the other bombs, and Daniels threatens to attack that country if another bomb explodes.
134	14	"Day 6: 7:00 p.m. – 8:00 p.m."	Jon Cassar	Teleplay by : Howard Gordon & Evan Katz; Story by : Manny Coto & David Fury	March 19, 2007	6AFF14	11.80
Jack returns to CTU and informs the others about Shadow Valley, while Marilyn tells Jack that she heard a report that Audrey Raines has died. Shocked at this, Jack tasks Chloe to check it, and she finds the report, which states that Raines died in a car crash in China, where she had come to find him while he was imprisoned, and a devastated Jack confronts Buchanan for hiding the report from him. Chloe states that Gredenko has an inside agent in CTU, and Doyle tasks her to check agent Nadia Yassir first, since she is a Muslim, angering Pressman, who is involved with Yassir, only for Chloe to find that she actually is the mole, which results in Yassir's arrest. Doyle starts interrogating her, until he is informed that the pilot of the drone has been located, and Jack and Doyle lead a team there and kill the pilot, while Jack manages to stop the drone, which gets damaged along with the bomb, leading to a radiation spill. Although the bomb did not detonate, Daniels still orders Secretary of Defense Ethan Kanin to prepare for a nuclear strike on the Middle-Eastern country, ignoring the disagreements of Lennox and Hayes, who has returned to help with the crisis.
135	15	"Day 6: 8:00 p.m. – 9:00 p.m."	Brad Turner	Howard Gordon & Manny Coto	March 26, 2007	6AFF15	11.78
An agent finds evidence that proves Yassir's computer was hacked, proving her innocence, and he shows it to Doyle, who decides not to reveal it for now. The agent finally reveals the evidence himself, and Pressman gets angry with Doyle, who explains that he was investigating more, while Yassir is freed and tries to quit, but Buchanan dissuades her. CTU locates an associate of Gredenko, named Mark Hauser, and Jack leads a team there, storming into Mark's house. Mark reveals that Gredenko will be meeting him there, and tasks his brother, Brady, who has a disability, to cooperate with CTU. Brady meets Gredenko, who is then captured and arrested by CTU, and Gredenko offers to surrender Fayed in exchange for a pardon and the guarantee not to be returned to Russia. Meanwhile, Hayes convinces Sandra to consent with reviving Wayne despite potential health risks, and upon being revived, Wayne orders the Air Force to stand down and abort the nuclear strike, but Daniels claims that Wayne is unfit to run the office and decides to invoke Section 4 of the 25th Amendment of the Constitution.
136	16	"Day 6: 9:00 p.m. – 10:00 p.m."	Brad Turner	Robert Cochran & Evan Katz	April 2, 2007	6AFF16	10.95
Daniels convenes the Cabinet, where both Wayne and Daniels defend their positions before the voting is held, with both parties earning an equal vote. The Attorney General interprets it as Wayne's victory, only for Daniels to claim that Hayes' vote is invalid, since she resigned earlier, and Lennox suggests that the Supreme Court could check the case. As Karen speaks with Buchanan over her contested vote, Daniels and Lisa Miller, his assistant, converse about committing perjury in an attempt to win the case. After CTU plants a tracker in Gredenko's forearm, Jack and Doyle prepare a sting operation to catch Fayed at a pier. There, Gredenko meets Fayed and reveals his deal with CTU, while claiming he had no choice. The agents storm in and find Gredenko's forearm containing the tracker amputated, while Fayed and Gredenko escape into a bar, only for Gredenko to betray Fayed by revealing to the customers that Fayed is a terrorist before escaping by himself. The crowd starts beating Fayed until Jack arrives and ultimately arrests him, while Gredenko succumbs to his wound in the coast. Having recorded Daniels and Miller's conversation about committing perjury, Lennox forces Daniels to drop the case, allowing Wayne to remain President, but to the shock of Lennox and Hayes, Wayne announces his plan to strike as Daniels intended.
137	17	"Day 6: 10:00 p.m. – 11:00 p.m."	Bryan Spicer	David Fury	April 9, 2007	6AFF17	11.45
As Wayne activates a nuclear strike on Fayed's country, the country's ambassador reveals that they have arrested a military general associated with Fayed. Upon receiving the information, Wayne calls off the strike and reveals to Hayes and Lennox that the missile was actually a decoy, as his nuclear strike was actually a ruse to force the Middle-Eastern country to fully cooperate. Jack tortures a captured Fayed, but finds it useless, ordering Fayed be transferred to CTU, but during transfer, CTU forces are attacked by armed people who rescue Fayed, telling him that they've been sent by the general. However, the attack and rescue of Fayed is revealed to be another ruse conducted by CTU in order to lure Fayed to find the bombs, with CTU agents portraying the armed rescuers. Fayed demands to talk to the general on the phone for confirmation that he sent them, and in order to get the general to cooperate, Wayne forces the ambassador to threaten the general's family in addition to torturing him. However, as the general is talking to Fayed, he gives a hidden distress message, and Fayed ultimately kills the others and escapes. Jack chases Fayed to his compound and engages in a vicious fight with him, ultimately managing to kill Fayed and his remaining men and secure the two remaining bombs, averting the crisis. However, Jack then gets a call from Cheng Zhi, who reveals a terrifying truth that Audrey Raines is actually still alive, but he has taken her hostage, and threatens to kill her if Jack does not perform his demands. Meanwhile, Wayne learns from Lennox about his leverage on Daniels.
138	18	"Day 6: 11:00 p.m. – 12:00 a.m."	Bryan Spicer	Matt Michnovetz & Nicole Ranadive	April 16, 2007	6AFF18	11.32
Cheng reveals that he desires to gain a circuit board hidden inside one of the bombs, which contains advanced Russian military technology, and demands that Jack remove from one of the bombs a circuit board in exchange for Raines, but as Jack attempts to remove the circuit board, he is stopped after Morris detects Chloe aiding him. Jack calls Wayne and makes an offer to plant explosives in the circuit board and detonate them after Raines is secured, meeting both wishes but sacrificing his own life. With some reluctance, Wayne approves it, and Doyle is tasked to accompany Jack. Meanwhile, with the information Wayne has learned from Lennox, he demands that Daniels resign, but during a press conference announcing the end of the crisis, he suddenly collapses, and his physician ultimately states that his status is critical, meaning he cannot run the office anymore. Daniels takes over again, and ultimately orders CTU to abort Jack's operation, but when Doyle hears about it and attempts to comply, Jack catches on and stops him, abandoning Doyle on the road and continuing on his own.
139	19	"Day 6: 12:00 a.m. – 1:00 a.m."	Brad Turner	Joel Surnow & Michael Loceff	April 23, 2007	6AFF19	10.41
CTU starts tracing Jack, who manages to lose them temporarily and eventually arrive at the location he's meeting Cheng. There, Jack confronts Cheng and tells him to let Raines leave until she is safe before he hands over the circuit board. As he is handing it over with the intent to use a bomb to detonate and destroy it, CTU agents, who have already arrived at the location, intervene, and in the ensuing shootout, they detain Jack and save Raines, but Cheng ultimately escapes with the circuit board in his possession, while Jack learns that Raines' traumatic experience has inflicted post-traumatic psychosis on her. Meanwhile, Daniels, who is revealed to be involved with Miller, fails to convince Lennox to destroy the tape, while a DOJ agent meets Hayes and plays a video of a captured Pollock revealing that Buchanan had Fayed in custody months before the attack and freed him. The agent advises Hayes to fire Buchanan in order to avoid her own expulsion, since the further the outcast is from the President, the less of a political scandal it will be. She eventually agrees to do it, and a disappointed Buchanan departs, leaving Yassir in command of CTU.
140	20	"Day 6: 1:00 a.m. – 2:00 a.m."	Brad Turner	Howard Gordon & Evan Katz	April 30, 2007	6AFF20	10.93
Back at CTU, a detained Jack claims he can get information from Raines, who is entrusted to a psychiatrist from Division. The psychiatrist intends to use extreme measures to get information from Raines, but while Yassir allows the psychiatrist to use his methods, Doyle disagrees with her opinions, and ultimately chooses to listen to Jack and frees him. Jack reaches out to Raines and escapes with her to a room, locking the door and starting to work on her for a location that could lead to Cheng's whereabouts, but CTU agents break in just as she mentions a name. A convinced Yassir orders the psychiatrist to leave, and sends Jack back to detention, promising she won't let the psychiatrist near Raines again. While driving, Cheng discovers that the circuit board is damaged, and his contact tells him he'll find someone to help him fix it, while Morris becomes more distant from Chloe after an argument. Meanwhile, Miller is revealed to be involved with another man named Mark Bishop, a lobbyist who is actually spying for the Russian government. Suvarov contacts Daniels and reveals his knowledge of Cheng's theft of the circuit board, threatening to attack a U.S. Army base in the region if it is not recovered. Lennox starts investigating and finds out about Bishop, as well as his affair with Miller, and Daniels confronts her, ordering her to cooperate with Lennox to end the crisis, and to make the Russians believe that the circuit board is recovered. Former Secretary of Defense James Heller arrives and takes Raines home after showing displeasure with Jack, blaming him for what happened to Raines and warning him to stay away from her.
141	21	"Day 6: 2:00 a.m. – 3:00 a.m."	Bryan Spicer	Manny Coto	May 7, 2007	6AFF21	10.92
CTU confirms the address Raines revealed, and Doyle leads a team there, but on arrival, they find it empty, only filled with weapons and explosives. Cheng's mercenaries, led by a man named Zhou Yong, enact a surprise attack on CTU and take the agents hostage, and when Zhou demands the director step forward, Pressman introduces himself instead of Yassir, and is killed by Zhou. The mercenaries start looking for Josh, and Jack instructs him to escape using the ventilation system. However, Jack and Marilyn end up being captured, and Zhou announces on the speaker that he will kill Marilyn if Josh does not surrender, which he ultimately does. Cheng is revealed to have made a deal with Phillip to deliver Josh to him in exchange for repairing the damaged circuit board, as Phillip desires to take Josh with him, seeing him as his "legacy". Meanwhile, Lennox plants information into the circuit board in Miller's PDA and instructs her to rendezvous with Bishop at his hotel room and act normal until he can upload the false intel and persuade the Russians to back down, and watches as she visits him and they start having sex.
142	22	"Day 6: 3:00 a.m. – 4:00 a.m."	Bryan Spicer	Howard Gordon & Evan Katz	May 14, 2007	6AFF22	10.57
As the mercenaries prepare to leave with Josh, the captive agents turn on them, killing some of the mercenaries, including Zhou. The others manage to take Josh to Cheng, only for Jack to arrive and save Josh in an ensuing battle, though Cheng manages to escape. Meanwhile, Miller leaves bed as planned to give Bishop the chance to upload the intel, but he finds out and attacks her viciously, but the agents storm in and capture him. As Miller is taken to medical care, Lennox demands that Bishop upload the intel and cooperate to avoid the death penalty, and Bishop is forced to agree. But when Daniels contacts Suvarov to tell him the same news, Suvarov reveals his knowledge of Bishop's capture and threatens to attack the American base soon, and Daniels, Lennox and Hayes deduce that Suvarov is under pressure from the military generals to fight the U.S.. Phillip then calls the White House, claiming that his deal with Cheng was ruined, and offers to give the circuit board to them if they give him Josh and safe passage to a country of his choice. After some debate over risking the life of one boy or the lives of a thousand soldiers going to war with Russia, Daniels approves the deal and informs CTU of it, and upon hearing the order, Doyle gets Josh into a helicopter while other agents prevent Jack from stopping the mission.
143	23	"Day 6: 4:00 a.m. – 5:00 a.m."	Brad Turner	Joel Surnow & Michael Loceff	May 21, 2007	6AFF23	10.31
As Doyle and Josh head to the location, Jack calls Hayes and convinces her that Phillip will never honor the deal he made and will keep the circuit board while taking Josh, and asks her to free him so that he can stop Phillip. Hayes contacts Buchanan, who is soon persuaded to help, and then stages an intentional car crash with the CTU vehicle transporting Jack, who manages to escape with Buchanan. They head to the seaside location where Phillip is to make the trade, while Karen is arrested for aiding Jack. As Jack and Buchanan watch, Phillip's operatives arrive on a boat, and in exchange for Josh, they hand over to Doyle an item which appears to be the circuit board, but it turns out to be a bomb, which explodes at the hands of Doyle, who loses his eyes. The operatives and Josh then board the boat and head to Phillip's location, which is an oil platform owned by his company, and Phillip is revealed to have made another deal with Cheng for asylum along with Josh in China. Meanwhile, Daniels keeps updating Suvarov, hoping to delay the conflict, and Lennox advises Daniels to free Hayes now that she and Jack are revealed to be right about Phillip. Chloe and Morris slowly begin to mend fences with each other while working, but Chloe then mysteriously collapses to the ground.
144	24	"Day 6: 5:00 a.m. – 6:00 a.m."	Brad Turner	Robert Cochran & Manny Coto & David Fury	May 21, 2007	6AFF24	10.31
Daniels learns about Phillip's whereabouts and intends to send an assault team to take out the platform, but his advisers convince him to send Navy pilots to destroy the platform instead so the circuit board will be destroyed, even though Josh's life will be at risk. Rather than return to CTU, Jack and Buchanan decide to take the risk and use the limited time to save Josh, and they fly towards the platform on a helicopter. A battle starts, during which Jack manages to kill all of Phillip's men and capture Cheng. Phillip attempts to escape with Josh, but Josh refuses to go with him, disowning him as a grandfather and denouncing his cruel actions, and ultimately makes his words clear by shooting Phillip in the chest, mortally wounding him. Jack gets Josh to run to safety and confronts his wounded father, ultimately choosing to leave him behind while commenting that he's taking the easy way out. Jack, Josh and Cheng manage to board the helicopter in time and they escape as the Navy jets destroy the platform, killing Phillip and ensuring the destruction of the circuit board. In the aftermath, Jack separates from the helicopter and departs elsewhere, with Buchanan convincing Yassir to let Jack go and not pursue him. Josh reunites with Marilyn, while Cheng, who arrogantly declares that China will not punish him, is arrested by CTU, and a recovering Chloe is informed that she is pregnant, so she decides to move back in with Morris. With the threat resolved, Suvarov aborts the attack, and Daniels frees Hayes and convinces her to resign and leave, declaring that she and Buchanan will have their charges dropped. Lennox also parts on good terms with Hayes and gives the tape to Daniels. Jack breaks in Heller's place and confronts him for his earlier actions, and while Heller acknowledges his unfairness towards Jack and takes back his previous harsh words, he still begs him to leave Raines alone for her safety. Jack ultimately accepts Heller's wishes and visits Raines while she is sleeping and says goodbye to her, before leaving the house and going on to the beach to take some time to reflect as dawn breaks.

== Production ==
A shocking twist from the fourth episode was the detonation of a suitcase nuke that killed twelve thousand civilians. The subsequent episodes, however, hardly showed any of the panic that would result from this. David Fury explained the development by saying that the intended writing direction kept fluctuating. "In the early seasons of 24, [the writers tried] to map out stories and arc out stories [beforehand] a little bit more than they did, say, in seasons four and five, and four and five turned out to be two of most successful seasons." The nuclear threat was defused before the end of the season, leading to a story that was more personal for Jack. A panel of writers at Comic-Con said that they originally planned for Tony Almeida to return in the sixth-season finale.

A ten-minute prequel to the sixth season of 24 is available on the Region-1 version of the Season 5 DVD. The clip begins seven months after Day 5 and shows the Chinese torturing Jack trying to learn the identity of a double agent in their ranks. What appear to be American covert-ops soldiers break into the complex and free Jack, bringing him to a Chinese man named Hong Wai. As Jack flinches in recognition of Hong, the Chinese show up and thank Jack for identifying the double agent they had suspected all along. Cheng Zhi then executes Hong.

Additionally, an epilogue to Season 6 was released called 24: Debrief. It was first made available to American Express cardholders but was later released on the Season 6 DVD.

=== Trailer ===
The original trailer for the sixth season opens with Kiefer Sutherland breaking the fourth wall and thanking the fans. The trailer features scenes from the first four episodes and sets Jack Bauer up to be sacrificed. It was released on October 24, 2006.

=== Casting ===
Eddie Izzard was cast as Darren McCarthy but left the show after one day of filming. According to Izzard, producers wanted to option further dates, but she was unavailable due to working on The Riches. She was replaced by David Hunt.

== Reception ==
On Rotten Tomatoes, the season has an approval rating of 74% with an average score of 7.9 out of 10 based on 31 reviews. The website's critical consensus reads, "24's sixth day still delivers the goods on the action front, but this season's attempt to introduce Jack Bauer's familial angst into proceedings feels more contrived than inspired."

Some members of the production staff cite Season 6 as their most disappointing season. In a 2010 interview, Howard Gordon said "I feel as though the story made a very wrong turn in season 6". In a 2016 interview, Gordon said: "This season was maligned by critics and fans, but there was a real challenge with where we’d left Jack. He had pretty much lost everything he had to lose, so in many ways he was like a walking ghost and even welcomed the chance to sacrifice his life. There’s no episode that stands out to me." Also, when speaking about Season 7, Kiefer Sutherland said "We hit a couple rough spots with a lot of our viewers in Season 6, and we really wanted to remedy that". Nevertheless, the season received many positive reviews, and holds a Metacritic score of 79 out of 100. For this season, Jean Smart received the Emmy nomination for Outstanding Guest Actress in a Drama Series and Kiefer Sutherland received his sixth nomination for Outstanding Lead Actor in a Drama Series.

=== Award nominations ===
Organization	Category	Nominee(s)	Result
Primetime Emmy Awards	Outstanding Sound Editing for a Series	William Dotson, Cathie Speakman, Pembrooke Andrews, Jeffrey Whitcher, Shawn Kennelly, Jeff Charbonneau, Laura Macias, Vince Nicastro, Rich Polanco, Vic Radulich	Won
Primetime Emmy Awards	Outstanding Lead Actor in a Drama Series	Kiefer Sutherland	Nominated
Primetime Emmy Awards	Outstanding Guest Actress in a Drama Series	Jean Smart	Nominated
Primetime Emmy Awards	Outstanding Music Composition for a Series (Dramatic Underscore)	Sean Callery	Nominated
Primetime Emmy Awards	Outstanding Stunt Coordination	Jeff Cadiente	Nominated
Primetime Emmy Awards	Outstanding Sound Mixing for a Comedy or Drama Series (One Hour)	William Gocke, Mike Olman, Ken Kobett, Jeff Gomillion	Nominated
Screen Actors Guild Awards	Outstanding Performance by a Stunt Ensemble in a Television Series	Jeff Cadiente, Terri Cadiente, Troy Gilbert, Tracy Hite, Dustin Meier, Laurence Rosenthal, Erik Stabenau, Justin Sundquist	Won
Producers Guild of America Awards	Television Producer of the Year Award in Episodic – Drama	Joel Surnow, Robert Cochran, Howard Gordon, Evan Katz, Jon Cassar, Michael Loceff, Michael Klick	Nominated

== Home media releases ==
The sixth season was released on DVD in region 1 on December 4, 2007 and in region 2 on October 1, 2007.
