= Charles Logan (24) =

Character from the television series 24

- 24 character
- Gregory Itzin as Charles Logan
- First appearance: Day 4 – Episode 16
- Last appearance: Day 8 – Episode 24
- Created by: Joel Surnow; Robert Cochran
- Portrayed by: Gregory Itzin
- Seasons: 4, 5, 6, 8

In-universe information
- Full name: Charles Logan
- Occupation: President of the United States (Season 4–5); Vice President of the United States (Season 4); United States Senator from California (Pre-series); Lieutenant Governor of California (Pre-series); Member of the California State Assembly from the 37th district (Pre-series)
- Spouse: Martha Logan (divorced)
- Political party: Republican Party
- Hometown: Santa Barbara, California
- Alma mater: Princeton University (Bachelor of Arts)

Charles Logan is a fictional character played by Gregory Itzin in the television series 24. During the show's fourth season, Logan is the Vice President of the United States who is sworn into office as President of the United States when then President John Keeler is critically injured in a terrorist attack. Subsequently, Logan's administration fell into corruption. The show's fifth season sees him engage in a massive conspiracy to solidify United States oil interests. Logan appears in the fifth and eighth seasons as the primary antagonist.

For the role, Itzin received two Primetime Emmy Award nominations for Outstanding Supporting Actor in a Drama Series in 2006 and Outstanding Guest Actor in a Drama Series in 2010.

== Characterization ==
Charles Logan has a Bachelor of Arts degree in History from Princeton University. Prior to his vice-presidency, he served as the CEO of Western Energy Coal & Reserve; he also served in the California State Legislature, as Lieutenant Governor of California and as a United States Senator.

Logan exhibits several characteristics that diminish his capacity to serve as president. In contrast to Palmer, Logan is seemingly incapable of making hard decisions independently, relying on the recommendations of his advisors. If none are available, Logan tries to withdraw himself from the situation entirely. Additionally, his resolve is weak, as he rarely stands behind the decisions he makes. Furthermore, he boasts of his achievements after a crisis is over, even if his claims do not reflect the reality of the situation.

After season 5 revealed that Logan was behind the backfiring conspiracy, show executive producer Evan Katz said that the President was more of a man hiding a secret and was just being a little smarter about how he projects himself. Star Kiefer Sutherland also noted that people like Logan who are underestimated can become very dangerous because it gives them a sort of cover.

In the commentary for the show's fifth season DVD, Itzin mentions how he, with the help of Jean Smart, who played his wife Martha, developed an extensive backstory for Logan to help focus his performance. Among other things, he decided that Logan was the son of a distinguished military and political leader. Logan's father physically abused him as a child, which Logan references twice in the finale; first when he tells Jack that he's a lot tougher than he appears to be, then again when he warns Martha that she doesn't know what pain is.

The backstory also included the Logans' son, who died in his twenties several years ago (which might have been the cause of Martha's mental breakdown). Throughout the day, Logan carried a small chain in his pocket which had been a gift from his son, though most shots that show the chain (such as when his pockets are emptied when Jack interrogates him) were cut for time. Itzin also commented that David Palmer was also a friend to Logan's son and visited him extensively.

Logan's reappearance in the sixth season show a man who is deeply sorry about his actions in the previous season. Logan has all but stated he is now a born again Christian and is searching for redemption. A scene of Logan in private confirms this, showing him grasping a Bible and quoting a passage for comfort. While he showed no ulterior motives, both President Wayne Palmer and Logan's ex-wife Martha understandably showed doubt as to whether Logan has truly changed.

While Logan may have changed during his reappearance in the sixth season, his actions in the eighth season show that he had either reverted to his previous self or he had never actually changed. He was still shown to be obsessed with establishing his legacy, committing more and more ruthless actions to do so and manipulating the new president Allison Taylor into pushing a peace treaty that was built on false premises.

Itzin has acknowledged a physical resemblance between himself and President Richard Nixon: "I have the hairline, and my posture’s mediocre."

== Appearances ==
=== 24: Season 4 ===
Logan is first contacted by President Keeler when it is discovered that Mitch Anderson commandeered a stealth fighter with the intent to shoot down Air Force One. Efforts to neutralize the stealth fighter fail, and Air Force One is shot down. As a result, the incapacitated Keeler was deemed unable to serve as president, and Logan was appointed president as a result of the Twenty-fifth Amendment to the United States Constitution.

After being sworn in, Logan is informed by one of his senior advisors, Mike Novick, that Marwan and his terrorist organization have managed to recover several codes to the nation's nuclear arsenal. While Marwan's people manage to steal a nuclear warhead and successfully launch it on board a missile, CTU Los Angeles desperately attempts to track him.

Unfortunately, Logan proves unprepared for both the office and the crisis. When CTU arrests an American civilian named Joe Prado due to his employment under Marwan, Logan is hesitant to face the political risk of detaining Prado without charge. Logan is slow to act, even though CTU and Novick point out that Prado is their only means of finding Marwan in time.

Unwilling to let Logan waste precious time, CTU agent Jack Bauer convinces his superiors to release Prado; afterwards he tortures Prado into revealing one of Marwan's hideouts. Logan, furious that Bauer has acted without his approval, dispatches the Secret Service to arrest him. However, the Secret Service disrupts Bauer's operation to capture Marwan, allowing him to escape.

Logan begins to doubt his ability to govern during the crisis. In response, Novick recruits David Palmer as an advisor, due to the crises he has faced as president. Though Logan initially welcomes Palmer's counsel, he becomes increasingly isolated as Palmer and Novick assume a more active role in leading the search for Marwan.

Eventually, CTU locates Marwan. Although he kills himself to avoid capture, CTU manages to use Marwan's equipment to track the missile and shoot it down before it reaches its target. Despite his lack of leadership during the crisis, Logan quickly accepts credit for his presumed handling of the situation. His only concession to Palmer is a private statement that he had "played a role".

In the midst of the hunt for Marwan, Palmer authorizes a covert CTU operation led by Bauer to extract Lee Jong, an associate of Marwan's, from the Chinese consulate in Los Angeles. During the incident, the Chinese Consul is killed by friendly fire. Chinese officials eventually link the operation to Bauer and demand his extradition.

Walt Cummings, Logan's aide, suggests arranging Bauer's murder to prevent his knowledge from being exploited by the Chinese. Though Logan vocally rejects this proposal, Novick later overhears a phone conversation in which Cummings orders a Secret Service agent to kill Bauer before he is turned over to Chinese authorities.

Palmer informs Logan of Cumming's actions, but the president disbelieves the story and refuses to take action. Palmer warns Bauer of the threat on his life, causing Bauer and his CTU colleagues to fake his death. While Bauer goes into hiding, Logan remains unaware of the truth, believing that the situation has been resolved.

=== 24: Season 5 ===
Logan prepares to meet Russian president Yuri Suvarov to sign an anti-terrorism defense treaty, seeing the event as the highlight of his presidency. He is startled by the news of David Palmer's assassination, which takes place the morning the treaty is to be signed. First Lady Martha Logan insists that Palmer had previously contacted her, warning of a possible terrorist attack. Logan, while seemingly sympathetic, is skeptical given her history of mental illness. Meanwhile, Eastern European separatists take hostages at an airport in opposition to the treaty. Logan orders CTU to organize a rescue, allowing the treaty to be signed as planned.

Walt Cummings comes to Logan and admits his complicity in Palmer's murder and the airport incident, and further confesses his involvement in an imminent terrorist attack involving the dispersal of nerve gas. Cummings claims that the attack will justify a stronger U.S. presence in Asia, and promote a greater acquisition of oil from the region. He also says that the American agent monitoring the attack has gone dark and is now beyond Cummings' reach. Logan is apparently appalled by Cummings' actions.

Meanwhile, Bauer, who has emerged from hiding to investigate Palmer's assassination, discovers that Cummings knows more about the plot than what he let on to Logan. After convincing Secret Service agent Aaron Pierce to let him speak with Logan, Bauer confronts Cummings and forces him to confess. Logan promptly orders Cummings arrested. Unfortunately, when government forces move in on the location of the nerve gas, they find it missing and the American agent dead. The terrorists had apparently discovered Cummings' plan.

Shortly after reinstating Bauer at CTU, Logan learns that Cummings has committed suicide. Meanwhile, the terrorists plan to release the nerve gas in a Los Angeles shopping mall. CTU head Lynn McGill urges Logan to allow the terrorists to succeed—potentially killing up to nine-hundred Americans—in the hopes of catching them and safeguarding the remaining canisters. Despite Audrey Raines' insistence that such a decision would be immoral, Logan agrees to McGill's plan. However, due to Bauer's last-minute intervention, the attack only kills eleven people.

Immediately thereafter, separatist leader Vladimir Bierko gives an ultimatum to Logan, demanding President Suvarov's motorcade route or else face the release of the remaining nerve gas. Ultimately, Logan caves to their demands. Unbeknownst to Logan, Martha joins Suvarov's motorcade in a successful attempt to have the route changed. After CTU thwarts the planned attack, Logan's vice president, Hal Gardner, suggests that he declare martial law until the end of the crisis. Logan does so, much to the dismay of Martha and Novick.

It is revealed that Logan has collaborated with former CTU agent Christopher Henderson in orchestrating the day's attacks. When CTU finally defeats the terrorists, Logan turns his full attention to eliminating all evidence of his crimes, ordering Henderson to stop Bauer and Wayne Palmer from retrieving an audio tape incriminating him in David Palmer's assassination. Logan has Bauer framed for the murder and issues an executive warrant for his arrest. When questioned, Logan claims to have evidence which he will disclose after Bauer is in custody.

Once Jack retrieves the tape, he heads to Van Nuys Airport to hand it off to Secretary of Defense James Heller, with the intent to bring down Logan. Once Heller is in possession of the recording, he attempts to cut a deal with Logan, requesting he step down quietly, and in return the recording will never see the light of day. Logan prepares to sign his resignation with Gardner being his witness before Henderson reveals he has retrieved the recording from Heller's men and Jack. Logan then asks Heller to tender his resignation.

Later, Logan is told by one of his co-conspirators, Graem, that Martha must be silenced. Logan confesses to Martha his culpability in Palmer's death and implores her to remain quiet for the good of the country. Logan tries one final time to control the situation, when Bauer hijacks a 727 plane being co-piloted by the man who has the recording. Graem fakes a distress signal from the plane, giving Logan the pretext to shoot it down. When the plane makes an emergency landing, Novick talks Logan out of shooting it down. Jack escapes with the tape.

Logan and Graem agree that the president must commit suicide, reasoning that his trial would do irreparable damage to the country. After apologizing to Martha, Logan prepares to shoot himself. Before he can, Logan receives a call from Miles Papazian, telling him that he will prevent the U.S. Attorney General from hearing the tape. Once he learns that Papazian has erased the tape, he cancels Bauer's arrest warrant. Logan meets with Aaron Pierce, whom he had taken prisoner before he could meet with Martha several hours earlier. Pierce refuses any deal with Logan, and Logan orders a Secret Service agent to kill Pierce, although Pierce subsequently escaped with help from Martha and Mike Novick.

At 5:59:03 a.m., Martha stalls the president by sleeping with him, allowing Bauer to sneak aboard Marine One. Once he is aboard, the president is kidnapped and interrogated by Bauer. Jack is unable to extract a confession from Logan, and is arrested by authorities. However, unbeknownst to Logan, Jack secretly placed a microtransmitter which later records him confessing his deeds to Martha. Logan is consequently arrested by U.S. Marshals during his eulogy of David Palmer, and is led away while Martha and Novick look on.

Karen Hayes speculates that Logan may be granted clemency for his actions in exchange for his immediate resignation in order to protect the country from the embarrassment of a trial. Hal Gardner was then expected to be sworn in as the new president. It was revealed during Day 6 that Logan resigned from office after pleading guilty to obstructing justice, and was placed under house arrest. His role in Palmer's assassination and the events of Day 5 were not publicized.

=== 24: Season 6 ===
When Jack Bauer is left a phone number by his father, Phillip, his call is answered by Logan, who has been placed under house arrest since Day 5. Logan agrees to help Bauer find Dmitri Gredenko, a Russian national who has supplied Islamic terrorists with Soviet-made nuclear weapons. Logan reveals that one of Gredenko's supporters, Anatoly Markov, was involved in the conspiracy during Day 5, and that Logan intends to use this knowledge as leverage in order to gain information on Gredenko. He insists that he is looking for redemption, but Bauer and President Wayne Palmer remain deeply distrustful. Palmer reluctantly grants Logan a temporary release in order to confront Markov.

Logan convinces Jack Bauer to let him talk to Anatoly Markov alone.

Logan enters a Russian consulate to confront Markov, threatening to implicate him in the Day 5 conspiracy unless he gives up Gredenko. Markov claims not to know anything. Logan leaves the consulate convinced that Markov is lying, prompting Jack to sneak into the consulate alone to extract information from Markov.

When Jack is in their custody, Logan requests he speak to Martha, who is now institutionalized. During the visit, Martha is disgusted by Logan's presence. Just when it is agreed that Martha would make the call, in a sudden fit of rage she stabs him in the shoulder with a kitchen knife, severing an artery. Logan is rushed to the hospital, but begins to flatline en route, with his last words, "Martha" before losing consciousness. He is not heard from for the rest of the season.

=== 24: Season 8 ===
Charles Logan makes his first appearance in the season when he offers to help President Taylor with the Russian government, who are attempting to back out of a peace treaty following the assassination of President Omar Hassan. The Russians' explanation is they do not believe the new President of the IRK, Hassan's wife Dalia, will be able to hold up the peace agreement; therefore they wish to drop out and have no part in it. Also during this episode it is learned that Logan was granted a presidential pardon from President Daniels.

Later, Jack Bauer learns of Logan's involvement in the government cover-up of Russian involvement in the death of President Hassan when he checks the recent calls of the assassin of Renee Walker. In the following hours, Logan attempts to prevent information about Russian involvement in Hassan's death being released, in order to protect himself and to prevent it undermining the treaty. As in his final hours as president, Logan is willing to go to any lengths to protect himself, including sanctioning murder, torture and press censorship. Logan persuades Taylor to have CTU mole Dana Walsh quietly tortured for the location of the evidence by men hired by him rather than grant her a pardon, and arrest journalist Meredith Reed to prevent her publishing the evidence given to her by Bauer. He also has Taylor place his aide Jason Pillar in charge of the hunt to find Jack Bauer, allowing Pillar to pass on information to Russian agents who will then kill Bauer. Numerous attempts to kill Bauer prove unsuccessful, however, increasing the pressure on Logan.

In the meantime Logan's private escort is attacked by Bauer, who kidnaps him and takes him underground. Bauer threatens to kill Logan unless he gives up the names of those behind the day's events: Logan names Novakovich, the Russian foreign minister. Unbeknown to Logan, Bauer also places a microtransmitter on him; Bauer listens in as Logan incriminates himself further in a conversation with Russian President Yuri Suvarov. Bauer leaves him there unconscious, only fifteen minutes before Novakovich is found dead. Logan is in a hospital bed when the episode ends. Bauer later finds Logan again, intending to use him to lure Suvarov into a trap so Bauer can assassinate him, although he then abandons the plan.

When Bauer is eventually captured, Logan makes arrangements for him to be murdered, taking President Taylor's silence as tacit approval. However, at the last moment she refuses to sign the peace treaty and rescinds the order for Bauer's death. Realizing that his plans to kill Jack Bauer and return to political power have failed, Logan murders his right-hand man Jason Pillar and then shoots himself in the head. However, he survives. EMTs responding to the scene believe that he will suffer permanent brain damage.

== Critical reception ==
Gregory Itzin was commended for his portrayal of a weak president, with some critics commenting that the character was partly inspired by Richard Nixon.

In 2006, Itzin was nominated for the Primetime Emmy Award for Outstanding Supporting Actor in a Drama Series. In 2010, Itzin was also nominated for the Primetime Emmy Award for Outstanding Guest Actor in a Drama Series for his appearance in the eighth season for the episode "Season 8: 1:00 p.m. – 2:00 p.m."
