= Jack Bauer =

Protagonist of the American television series '24'

- 24 character
- Kiefer Sutherland as Jack Bauer
- First appearance: Day 1 – Episode 1
- Last appearance: Live Another Day – Episode 12
- Created by: Joel Surnow; Robert Cochran
- Portrayed by: Kiefer Sutherland
- Days: 1, 2, 3, 4, 5, 6, 7, 8, 9
- Other appearances: 24: The Game; 24: Redemption

In-universe information
- Family: Phillip Bauer (father); Graem Bauer (brother)
- Spouse: Teri Bauer (deceased)
- Children: Kim Bauer
- Relatives: Teri Wesley (granddaughter); Josh Bauer (nephew)

Jack Bauer is a fictional character and the protagonist of the Fox television series 24. Throughout the majority of the series' running, Bauer serves as a key member of the fictional CTU and other institutions. Bauer's job usually involves helping prevent major terrorist attacks on the United States, saving both civilian lives and government administrations. On many occasions, Jack does so at great personal expense, as those he thwarts subsequently target him and his loved ones. Bauer is not a crooked agent, though his frequent use of torture to gather information has generated much controversy and discussion.

Actor Kiefer Sutherland portrays Jack Bauer in the television show and video game. The television series was originally set to end on May 24, 2010, after eight successful seasons but was revived for a limited ninth season, which premiered on May 5, 2014. A feature film was set to be released; however, discussions ended over a contract dispute with Fox.

Bauer has received critical acclaim from audiences and critics. TV Guide ranked him No. 49 on their list of "TV's Top 50 Heroes" and Sky 1 listed Jack as No. 1 on their list of "TV's toughest men". Entertainment Weekly named Jack Bauer one of The 20 All Time Coolest Heroes in Pop Culture. In June 2010, Entertainment Weekly also named him one of the 100 Greatest Characters of the Last 20 Years. Jack is also the only character in the show to have appeared in all episodes.

== Concept and creation ==
24 co-creator Joel Surnow commented that they did not have any actors in mind for the part; "We didn't really know who it was. We were casting a lot of people and then we heard Kiefer Sutherland's name and thought, that's Jack Bauer." In 2000, Sutherland was contacted by his friend, director Stephen Hopkins, who was working on the pilot for the experimental real-time TV show and offered him the lead. Initially Sutherland had reservations about playing Bauer, stating, "I thought, 'This is really clever and different, so there's no way they're going to pick it up. But I could use the money, and no one will ever see it'."

Sutherland must produce around 24 hours of film each season, "which is like making 12 movies, so there are going to be mistakes along the way, but I am incredibly surprised by how many things work well as a result of working at that pace." In 2006, Sutherland signed a contract to play the role of Bauer for three seasons following season five. The contract was reported to be worth $40 million. Sutherland is also an executive producer of 24.

== Fictional biography ==
Jack Bauer was born in Santa Monica, California, on February 18, 1966, to Phillip Bauer, who placed his livelihood in his company, BXJ Technologies. The name of Jack's mother is unknown. Jack had one brother, Graem Bauer. Phillip originally planned to give the company to Jack, but as Jack said in Day 6, "I just had to go my own way."

Jack has a Bachelor of Arts degree in English Literature from the University of California, Los Angeles and a Master of Science degree in Criminology and Law from the University of California, Berkeley. He enlisted in the United States Army and later graduated from Officer Candidate School. His branch was infantry. He first served in the Special Forces, and was later a member of the 1st Special Forces Operational Detachment-Delta (1st SFOD-D), popularly known as Delta Force. Among his awards and decorations are the Silver Star, the Purple Heart, and the Legion of Merit. Apart from Special Forces and Delta training, he received Airborne, Air Assault, and Ranger training. He left the Army with the rank of Captain after twelve years of service.

While in the Army, he married Teri Bauer and had one child, Kim Bauer. Following his military career, Jack worked for both the Los Angeles Police Department's Special Weapons and Tactics unit and for the Central Intelligence Agency (CIA) as a Case Officer in the National Clandestine Service. He was recruited into the Counter Terrorist Unit (CTU) by Christopher Henderson, CTU's Director of Field Operations.

Bauer has shown a high proficiency with firearms (typically using a SIG P228 as his weapon of choice for the first and second seasons, then switching to a USP Compact, until after Season 8 he switches again, this time to a P30). He also can handle explosives and electronic devices, and has a high resistance to torture (after being kidnapped by Chinese agents and tortured for almost two years, it is revealed he didn't speak a single word the whole time). He is fluent in German (Season 8) and has demonstrated some ability to either speak or understand Spanish (Seasons 1 and 3), Serbian (Season 1), Russian (Season 6), and Arabic (Season 8). He is also shown to be capable of flying planes (Season 2) and helicopters (Seasons 3, 5, 8, and 9). Jack is a formidable hand-to-hand combatant from his years in the Army and as a federal agent, and he has killed multiple enemies in hand-to-hand combat.

Bauer generally wishes to live a humble life, but is willing to step forward and protect his country, even at the expense of his own health. His involvement throughout the show had caused him to lose many of his loved ones, despite his leadership and own calls. While the government acknowledges his service, Bauer and his superiors clash over his more rogue and extreme actions he takes without explicit authorization.

Jack has lost his wife Teri, murdered by a traitor who had infiltrated CTU. His relationship with his daughter Kim is at times tumultuous (Season 2, Season 5) while at other times accepting of who he is and what he must do (Season 7, Season 8). In his goal to find peace, he gets involved with Audrey Raines, the daughter of United States Secretary of Defense James Heller, whom Jack works for. The relationship with the Secretary's daughter is all but severed when Jack makes the decision to save a material witness over Audrey's ex-husband. He lost his best friend, Tony Almeida, and former boss, Michelle, to a car bomb. He lost his friend, former President David Palmer, to the same assassin who killed his friends. His girlfriend Renee Walker was killed by an assassin's bullet. His own government that he has sworn to protect has turned on him (former President Logan, President Taylor), and at the beginning of Season 7 he is on trial for his interrogation tactics. Finally, the friend he thought was dead (Tony Almeida), betrays him when he turns to terrorism in order to seek revenge against the person who killed his wife, Michelle.

Jack's final dialogue with FBI Special Agent Renee Walker in Season 7 offers insight into his perspective on torture and its ramifications:

Jack: I've been wrestling with this one my whole life. I see 15 people held hostage on a bus, and everything else goes out the window. I will do whatever it takes to save them- and I mean whatever it takes. I guess maybe I thought if I save them I could save myself.

Renee: [Chuckles] Do you regret anything that you did today?

Jack: [Chuckles] No. But then again, I don't work for the FBI.

Renee: I don't understand.

Jack: You took an oath. You made a promise to uphold the law. When you cross that line, it always starts off with a small step. Before you know it, you're running as fast as you can in the wrong direction just to justify what you started in the first place. These laws were written by much smarter men than me. And in the end, I know that these laws have to be more important than the 15 people on the bus. I know that's right. In my mind I know that's right. I-I just don't think my heart could ever have lived with that. I guess the only advice I can give you is try to make choices that you can live with.

== In other media ==
As the principal character in 24, Jack plays a prominent role in the television series as well as the video game. Jack is the lead protagonist of the 24 series and the books, and has appeared in every episode to date. Kiefer Sutherland has portrayed Jack Bauer in these episodes, including the prequels and the webisodes. Additionally, he voiced the same character in 24: The Game, 24: Day Zero and 24: DVD Board Game.

=== 24 Prequels ===
Jack Bauer is also featured in all four prequels, that can be found on the 24 DVD releases and various websites. These prequels are designed to bridge the gap between seasons. They provide backstory into story arcs for upcoming seasons, namely insight into what Jack's actions have been leading up to the next season. Prequels have been made for Seasons 4, 5, 6, and 7.

=== 24 Webisodes ===
24: Day 6 Debrief takes place 35 hours after the nuclear device exploded in Valencia, California. The series consists of 5 segments, no longer than three minutes in length each. Two agents, Agent Ramirez and Agent Moss, track Jack down to a hotel room and ask him to come to District for debriefing about the recovery of the tactical nukes. The Debrief consists of Agent Ramirez and other agents attempting to discover more about the supposed-death of an undercover agent, Marcus Holt, who disappeared shortly after Jack's imprisonment in China at the hands of Cheng Zhi. Since Holt was involved with the Chinese government, it is believed that Jack leaked information that led to his identity being discovered and execution. At the end of the series, the agents announce that they have no conclusive evidence about his involvement, but Ramirez promises to keep a close eye on him until he is certain. Jack tells Ramirez that if he ever sees him again, he better say "The Lord's Prayer", because it will mean he's come to kill him.

With that, Bauer is released from custody and the interrogation ends.

=== 24: The Game ===
Bauer in 24: The Game, which takes place six months after Day 2.

24: The Game takes place between Day 2 and 3. Jack begins waiting outside a ship where terrorists are going to release a ricin bomb in the water supply. A CTU Team triggers an alarm causing Jack and his team to storm the ship. Jack and his team find the whole ship's crew dead in a cargo hold. He runs into Peter Madsen, an enemy from his past. It is unclear what the story is between them, but it is stated that he framed Jack's family for a vile crime, this is hinted with Jack saying to him: "Eight years ago, my family was not involved". Madsen also states that he no longer takes orders from Jack. It's hinted that Madsen was under Jack's command either in the army or in a SWAT team, and Madsen betrayed Jack. Madsen kidnaps Jack's daughter Kim, and later Kate Warner. Jack finally kills Madsen near the end of the game when he tries to escape by shooting up his speedboat with a Zastava M80 assault rifle, causing it to explode. He also kills Max, who was holding Kate hostage, saving her life. However Max managed to shoot Jack once before dying, the second of two times he was shot in the final hour of the game, the first time by Madsen. As a result, Chase Edmunds takes Jack to the hospital via helicopter.

=== 24 Toys ===
Diamond Select Toys released 1/6 scale figures based on Jack Bauer:

- 2008– Jack Bauer 8:00 AM
- 2009– Jack Bauer 3:00 PM Season 1
- 2009– Jack Bauer 9:00 PM Season 1

Diamond Select Toys released 1/24 scale Minimates based on 24:

- 2007– Season 1 Box Set (Jack Bauer, Nina Myers, David Palmer, Kim Bauer)
- 2007– End of Day 1 Two-Pack, PX Exclusive (Jack Bauer, Andre Drazen)
- 2007– Season 2 Box Set (Season 2 Jack Bauer, Tony Almeda, Michelle Dessler, George Mason)
- 2007– End of Day 2 Two-Pack, Suncoast/FYE Exclusive (Stretcher Jack Bauer, Prisoner Nina Myers)
- Canceled– Season 3 Box Set (Undercover Jack Bauer, Sherry Palmer, Chloe O'Brien, Chase Edmunds)
- Canceled– End of Day 3 Two-Pack (Jack Bauer, Stephen Saunders)

Enterbay released 1/6 scale figures based on 24:

- 2009– Jack Bauer
- 2009– President David Palmer

McFarlane Toys released 1/12 scale figures based on Jack Bauer:

- 2007– Jack Bauer Boxed Set 1
- 2007– Jack Bauer Boxed Set 2

Medicom Toy (Japan) released 1/6 scale figures based on Jack Bauer in their Real Action Heroes line:

- 2005– Jack Bauer (Suit) Season 4 7:00 am – 8:00 am
- 2005– Jack Bauer (Tac) Season 4 11:00 am – 12:00 pm
- 2007– Jack Bauer Season 5

=== 24 comic books ===
IDW has released a series of comic books based on the adventures of Jack Bauer and other members of the 24 Cast. 24's Comic License is published by IDW Publishing

- 24: One Shot (takes place on Jack's first day on the job at the Los Angeles Unit of the Counter Terrorist Unit)
- 24: Midnight Sun (Jack has to stop a naughty environmentalist group from using explosives to get their point across)
- 24: Stories (takes place in the 3-year gap between Seasons 2&3. In Stories, Jack is newly undercover with Ramon Salazar.
- 24: Nightfall – A tale shedding more light on the background and characters of Day 1, including Victor Drazen. Written by J. C. Vaughn and Mark L. Haynes
- 24: Cold Warriors – An original tale of intrigue featuring Jack Bauer and Chloe O'Brian, set in Alaska. Written by Beau Smith and Steve Bryant

== Critical reception ==
Having won an Emmy Award (with 5 other nominations), a Golden Globe (with 4 other nominations), two SAG Awards (with 3 other nominations) and two Satellite Awards, Kiefer Sutherland's performance as Jack Bauer became (award-wise) the third most acclaimed Male Lead Dramatic TV performance of the 2000s behind James Gandolfini (with 3 Emmys, 1 Golden Globe and 3 SAG Awards) and Bryan Cranston (with 4 Emmys, 1 Golden Globe, 2 SAG Awards, and 4 Satellite Awards). He is also one of only two Male Lead Drama TV Actors ever to have won all 4 awards, the other being Bryan Cranston for his role as Walter White on Breaking Bad.

Entertainment Weekly put it on its end-of-the-decade, "best-of" list, saying, "When Kiefer Sutherland's 24 superagent barks "Dammit, Chloe—we're running out of time!" America's ass is about to be saved in some new, heart-stopping way."

Some American politicians and lawyers have used Jack Bauer and his actions to frame the debate on American interrogation techniques (in this case, "torture"), which have become an object of intense controversy. As well, at a 2007 legal conference in Ottawa, Canada, Jack Bauer's tactics were raised during a panel discussion about "terrorism, torture and the law". Panel members, including U.S. Supreme Court Justice Antonin Scalia, discussed the use of torture "in times of great crisis". Scalia was quoted as saying: "Jack Bauer saved Los Angeles. He saved hundreds of thousands of lives. Is any jury going to convict Jack Bauer? I don't think so."

Several philosophers have used Jack Bauer's character to settle challenging moral questions. Twenty philosophers contributed to a 2007 book, 24 and Philosophy: The World According to Jack, which assesses Bauer through the eyes of famous philosophers. For the 24: Live Another Day series, in which anti-hero Jack Bauer and anti-villain Margot Al-Harazi have similar ethical viewpoints, some philosophers have resorted to Iain King's quasi-utilitarian approach to determine that Bauer is morally superior.
