= Raaghav Chanana =

Indian actor and stage director

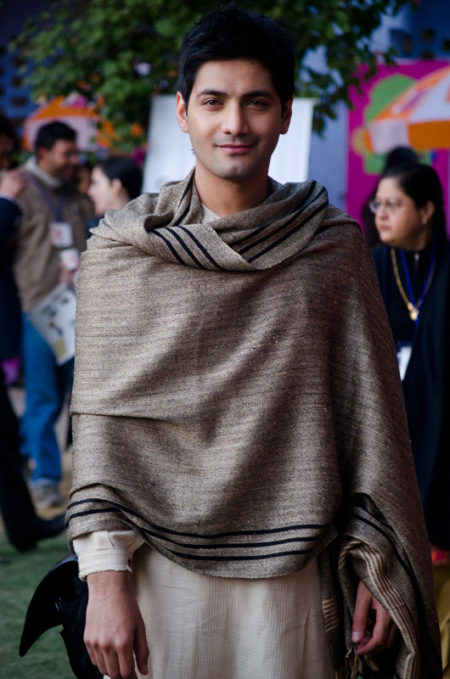
- Raaghav Chanana in 2013.
- Born: Raaghav Chanana; 20 August 1983 (age 42); New Delhi, India
- Occupation: Actor
- Height: (5 ft 8 in (1.73 m))

Raaghav Chanana is an Indian actor and stage director. Chanana studied Economics at London School of Economics before taking up the acting career. He was cast in Shakespeare's Twelfth Night, directed by Stephen Beresford, and performed for 10 weeks in London's West End. He also played the lead role of Rahim, a singing-dancing hero in a Bollywood style musical, Yeh Hai Mumbai Meri Jaan (This Is Mumbai, My Dear), directed by Sanjoy Roy, and which toured across the UK, performed at the Belfast Festival at Queen's, Ireland, and at the Esplanade Festival in Singapore.

He directed Patrick Marber's Closer and John Donnelly's Bone, and then proceeded to form his own theatre company, Fly On The Wall, under which he produced and directed avant-garde theatre.

He has continued working as an actor including with theatre directors Roysten Abel, Sunil Shanbag, Atul Kumar and Rehaan Engineer. He is performing as the NRI American groom in Girish Karnad's Wedding Album, directed by Lilette Dubey.

Chanana played the romantic lead in a telefilm produced by Shahrukh Khan's Red Chillies Entertainment, when he won a nationwide acting contest held by MTV. He hosted travel shows and also worked in music videos and commercials. Chanana's English feature film debut was in Lessons in Forgetting. The film won the National Award for Best English Film.

Chanana has the series regular role of Prithvi Singhania in the Indian version of the American TV series, 24. The cast of the show received the 2013 Golden Petal Award for Best Ensemble Cast on Indian Television.

== Filmography ==
Year	Title	Role	Language	Notes
2010	Luv Ho Jaane De	Rick	Hindi	TV movie
2011	Zindagi Na Milegi Dobara	Nikhil	Hindi	
2011	Lessons in Forgetting	Soman	English	
2011	Among Us	Abhay	English	Short Film
2013	Rangrezz	Joy	Hindi	
2013	24 Season 1	Prithvi Singhania	Hindi	
2014	M Cream	Niz	Hindi	
2015	Zubaan	Surya Kapoor Sikand	Hindi	
2016	24 Season 2	Prithvi Singhania	Hindi	
