= 24 (Indian TV series) =

2013–2016 action thriller series

- Genre: Suspense; Serial drama Political thriller Action
- Created by: Joel Surnow; Robert Cochran
- Based on: 24
- Written by: Rensil D'Silva; Bhavani Iyer; Niranjan Iyengar; Priya Pinto
- Directed by: Rensil D'Silva; Abhinay Deo; Nitya Mehra
- Creative director: Nivedita Basu
- Starring: Anil Kapoor; Neil Bhoopalam; Raaghav Chanana; Anita Raj; Tisca Chopra; Mandira Bedi; Madhurima Tuli; Yuri Suri; Pooja Ruparel; Shivani Tanksale; Adhir Bhatt; Ajinkya Deo; Sapna Pabbi; Akshay Ajit Singh; Rahul Singh; Priyansh Jora; Sakshi Tanwar; Angad Bedi; Sikander Kher; Karanvir Sharma; Sudhanshu Pandey; Ashish Vidyarthi; Naveen Polishetty; Amruta Khanvilkar; Sumit Kaul
- Country of origin: India
- Original language: Hindi
- No. of seasons: 2
- No. of episodes: 48

Production
- Executive producer: Apurba Sengupta
- Producers: Anil Kapoor; Udayan Bhat; Ajinkya Deo; Howard Gordon; Sanaullah Khan; Apurba Sengupta
- Cinematography: Jay Pinak Oza; Tanay Satam; Jitan Harmeet Singh; Anil Devaiah
- Production companies: Ramesh Deo Productions; 20th Century Fox Television Distribution

Original release
- Network: Colors TV
- Release: 4 October 2013 – 9 October 2016

24 is an Indian Hindi-language action thriller television series which aired on Colors TV, based on the American series of the same name. It aired from 4 October 2013 through 21 December 2013. It was written by Rensil D'Silva and Bhavani Iyer, directed by Abhinay Deo and Nitya Mehra, and produced by Ramesh Deo Productions. Season 2 aired from 23 July 2016 to 9 October 2016.

The Hindi version of 24 is the first adaptation of the show; the India rights were acquired from Fox and 24 producer Howard Gordon by the production company of Anil Kapoor, who also plays the lead role in the adaptation. In November 2011, Kapoor's production house signed a ₹ 100 crore ($20 million at the time) deal to adapt the series. The show is set in Mumbai with the main set of the Anti-Terrorist Unit (ATU) being a replica of the one in the original series. Bollywood actors Anupam Kher and Shabana Azmi both have cameo performances in the show.

The season is directed by Abhinay Deo and Rensil D'Silva, written by Rensil D'Silva and Bhavani Iyer and is supervised by Manisha Sharma. The second season aired in July 2016 to October 2016.

Following its original television run on Colors TV, both seasons of the series made their digital debut on JioHotstar starting 24 April 2026. The platform follows a staggered release schedule, dropping eight episodes every Friday.

== Plot ==
=== Season 1 ===
The season focuses on ATU Chief Jai Singh Rathore (Anil Kapoor), who is torn between saving his family and the entire nation from a major terrorist attack. With assassins and attackers on the loose, it is up to Jai to save the country's Prime Minister-elect Aditya Singhania (Neil Bhoopalam), even possibly from members of his own family, with the eye of suspicion lingering on his cousin and Chief of Staff, Prithvi Singhania (Raaghav Chanana).

=== Season 2 ===
Jai gets a terror mastermind Roshan Sherchan (Ashish Vidyarthi) arrested along with accomplice Shivani Malik (Sakshi Tanwar). But Roshan's brother Haroon Sherchan (Sikander Kher) threatens to infect Mumbai with a virus that can put everyone's life at risk. While members of the Anti Terrorism Unit (including Shivani Malik) are trying their best to solve the case, Jai Rathod, unbeknownst to them, is hatching a plan to free Roshan. Jai has drawn further ire from his son for being romantically involved with a new woman Maya (Surveen Chawla). Maya also has a connection to the terrorist brothers and is in a relationship with Haroon. Aditya (Neil Bhoopalam) & Prithvi Singhania (Raaghav Chanana) continue to hold fort on the political front as the country unravels into chaos, while hidden secrets in their family saga begin to unravel.

== Production ==
Kapoor, who had previously featured in the American version of the 24 series playing President Omar Hassan of the fictional Islamic Republic of Kamistan in Series 8 (2010-11), bought the official rights of 24 in November 2011. The show aired in Hindi and was also dubbed in various regional languages. India is the first country outside of the US to get rights to adapt the show. "We hope this will pave the way for many more local versions of this brilliant series in other international territories," Fox International Television president Marion Edwards said in an email reply to ET. Kiefer Sutherland, who starred in the original show has shown interest in acting in the Hindi version.

Colors channel bought the broadcast rights in a deal estimated at Rs 150 crore. Kapoor holds the rights of the 192 episodes for a period of four years extendable to another ten.

The first season featured the Tata Safari Storme as presenting sponsor, whereas the second season featured the Maruti Suzuki S-Cross. Both cars were advertised prominently in the show.

On 21 October 2013, Kapoor launched Tata Safari Storm presents 24 – The Game, a 3D game in which players participate as ATU Chief Jai Singh Rathod, portrayed on-screen by Kapoor.

The second season of the series also known as Day 2, commenced airing on 23 July 2016. The show is written by Rensil D'Silva, Niranjan Iyengar and Priya Pinto, directed by Abhinay Deo. began shooting in February 2016. Sakshi Tanwar, Surveen Chawla, Sikander Kher, Madhurima Tuli and Ashish Vidyarthi were announced as new main cast members. As with the original show, the plot concerns a mission to save the country from a tragedy, and later an attempt to implicate the conspirators responsible for it. Season 2 of 24 is loosely based on the third season of the original series, while borrowing some story elements from the second season.

== Cast ==
=== Main ===
- Anil Kapoor (season 1–2) as Jai Singh Rathore based on Jack Bauer
- Neil Bhoopalam (season 1–2) as Aditya Singhania, based on President David Palmer.
- Raaghav Chanana (season 1–2) as Prithvi Singhania, Aditya's cousin and Chief of Staff, inspired from Wayne Palmer and Mike Novick.
- Anita Raj (season 1–2) as Naina Singhania, Aditya and Divya's mother, inspired from Sherry Palmer.
- Sapna Pabbi (season 1–2) as Kiran Rathod, Jai and Trisha's teenage daughter, based on Kim Bauer.
- Tisca Chopra (season 1) as Trisha Rathod, Jai's wife, based on Teri Bauer
- Mandira Bedi (season 1) as Nikita Rai, a government agent at ATU based on Nina Myers.
- Adhish Khanna (season 1)/Akshay Ajit Singh (season 2) as Veer Singh Rathod, Jai and Trisha's son, based on Kim Bauer.
- Madhurima Tuli (season 2) as Dr. Devyani Bhowmick, Aditya's girlfriend. Inspired from Dr. Anne Packard.
- Sakshi Tanwar (season 2) as Shibani Mallick, based on

=== Recurring ===
- Adhir Bhatt (season 1) as Tejpal Singh Sandhu, a government agent at ATU, based on Tony Almeida.
- Shivani Tanksale (season 1) as Divya Singhania Maurya, sister of Aditya and wife of Vikrant, loosely based on Nicole Palmer.
- Rahul Singh (season 1). as Vikrant Maurya, Divya's husband.
- Pooja Ruparel (season 1) as Pooja Bharadwaj, an aide to the minister.
- Yuri Suri (season 1) as Mahendra Gill, a senior Research and Analysis Wing officer who takes control of the ATU, based on George Mason.
- Shivkumar Subramaniam (season 1) as Kamaljit Sood, a Senior Research and Analysis Wing (RAW) officer who comes to question Jai, inspired from Ryan Chappelle.
- Nissar Khan (season 1) as Murad Ali.
- Suchitra Pillai (season 1) as Mehek Ahuja, a TV Journalist and Vikrant's lover, based on Maureen Kingsley & George Feragamo.
- Shahnawaz Pradhan (season 1) as KK, inspired by Carl Webb.
- Aradhana Jagota (season 1) as Jhanvi Abhay Gupta, Kiran's friend, based on Janet York.
- Priyansh Jora (season 1) as Rohit, based on Rick Allen.
- Kiran Srinivas (season 1) as Dev Sharma, based on Dan Mount.
- Nikunj Malik (season 1) as Simran, the girl whom Veer helps.
- Gurpreet Saini (season 1–2) as Mihir, based on Milo Pressman.
- Kishor Kadam (season 1) as Ravinder, LTFE Chief, based on Victor Drazen of the original show.
- Rajeev Siddhartha (season 1) as Bala Ravinder, Ravinder's son, inspired from Alexis Drazen.
- Dibyendu Bhattacharya (season 1) as Raja, Ravinder's right-hand man, inspired from Andre Drazen.
- Ankur Vikal (season 1) as Yakub Sayeed, terrorist leader, based on Ira Gaines.
- Ajinkya Deo (season 1) as Kartik Chandrashekhar / Abhay Gupta, Jhanvi's Fake father, based on
- Rajat Kaul (season 1) as Gajavathanan & Max Ferraro, an assassin & a free line photographer, based on Martin Belkin.
- Nikkitasha Marwaha (Season 1–2) as Mehr, an assassin based on the character Mandy from the original show.
- Rahul Khanna (season 1) as Tarun Khosla, a young rich businessman.
- Richa Chadda (season 1) as Sapna, a cameo.
- Bikramjeet Kanwarpal (season 1) as Agent Pradhan.
- Shweta Pandit (season 1)
- Vikas Shrivastav as Shinde (season 2)
- Sikander Kher (season 2) as Haroon Sherchan, younger brother of Roshan Sherchan who wants his brother to be out of prison based on Hector Salazar.
- Ashish Vidyarthi (season 2) as Roshan Sherchan, a narcoterrorist caught by Jai, based on Ramon Salazar
- Surveen Chawla (season 2) as Maya, based on Claudia Hernandez
- Harsh Chhaya (season 2) as Siddharth Saigal, Intelligence Bureau Head
- Sumit Kaul (season 2) as Gyan Thakkar, thought at one point to be an enemy mole, he was revealed to have been working with Jai to coordinate an elaborate sting operation in which Jai would infiltrate the Sherchan's operation and gain their trust by breaking Roshan out of prison, based on Gael Ortega.
- Karanvir Sharma (season 2) as Raj Singh Bhakta
- Sudhanshu Pandey (season 2) as Vedant Acharya original cast as Tony Almeida
- Naveen Polishetty (season 2) as Kush Sawant, based on Kyle Singer
- Gunjan Malhotra (season 2) as Zaara
- Akash Khurana (season 2) as Bhisham Bhowmick
- Prerna Wanvari (season 2)
- Angad Bedi (season 2) as Dhruv Awasthi, based on Michael Amador
- Pallavi Patil (season 2) as Mitali
- Sharad Ponkshe (Season 2) as Amar Mane-Shinde, based on Alan Milliken
- Amruta Khanvilkar (season 2) as Antara Mane-Shinde, based on Julia Milliken
- Ritu Shivpuri (season 2) as Dr. Sunny Mehta
- Rajesh Khera (season 2) as Sudeep
- Manasi Rachh (season 2) as Maddy
- Nagesh Bhonsle (season 2) as Marathe
- Faezeh Jalali (season 2) as Jia
- Megha Burman (season 2) as Vaidehi

=== Guest ===
- Anupam Kher (season 1) as Wasim Khan, a Research and Analysis Wing officer based on Richard Walsh
- Shabana Azmi (season 1–2) as Abhilasha Grewal, based on the character Alberta Green.
- Ronit Roy (season 2) as Roy

== Episodes ==
Episode		Original Air Date	Name of the Episode
Overall	Season	Original Air Date	Name of the Episode
Season 1
1	1	4 October 2013	Day 1: 12:00 a.m. – 1:00 a.m.
2	2	5 October 2013	Day 1: 1:00 a.m. – 2:00 a.m.
3	3	11 October 2013	Day 1: 2:00 a.m. – 3:00 a.m.
4	4	12 October 2013	Day 1: 3:00 a.m. – 4:00 a.m.
5	5	18 October 2013	Day 1: 4:00 a.m. – 5:00 a.m.
6	6	19 October 2013	Day 1: 5:00 a.m. – 6:00 a.m.
7	7	25 October 2013	Day 1: 6:00 a.m. – 7:00 a.m.
8	8	26 October 2013	Day 1: 7:00 a.m. – 8:00 a.m.
9	9	1 November 2013	Day 1: 8:00 a.m. – 9:00 a.m.
10	10	2 November 2013	Day 1: 9:00 a.m. – 10:00 a.m.
11	11	8 November 2013	Day 1: 10:00 a.m. – 11:00 a.m.
12	12	9 November 2013	Day 1: 11:00 a.m. – 12:00 p.m.
13	13	15 November 2013	Day 1: 12:00 p.m. – 1:00 p.m.
14	14	16 November 2013	Day 1: 1:00 p.m. – 2:00 p.m.
15	15	22 November 2013	Day 1: 2:00 p.m. – 3:00 p.m.
16	16	23 November 2013	Day 1: 3:00 p.m. – 4:00 p.m.
17	17	29 November 2013	Day 1: 4:00 p.m. – 5:00 p.m.
18	18	30 November 2013	Day 1: 5:00 p.m. – 6:00 p.m.
19	19	6 December 2013	Day 1: 6:00 p.m. – 7:00 p.m.
20	20	7 December 2013	Day 1: 7:00 p.m. – 8:00 p.m.
21	21	13 December 2013	Day 1: 8:00 p.m. – 9:00 p.m.
22	22	14 December 2013	Day 1: 9:00 p.m. – 10:00 p.m.
23	23	20 December 2013	Day 1: 10:00 p.m. – 11:00 p.m.
24	24	21 December 2013	Day 1: 11:00 p.m. – 12:00 a.m.
Season 2
25	1	23 July 2016	Day 2: 10:00 a.m. – 11:00 a.m.
26	2	24 July 2016	Day 2: 11:00 a.m. – 12:00 p.m.
27	3	30 July 2016	Day 2: 12:00 p.m. – 1:00 p.m.
28	4	31 July 2016	Day 2: 1:00 p.m. – 2:00 p.m.
29	5	6 August 2016	Day 2: 2:00 p.m. – 3:00 p.m.
30	6	7 August 2016	Day 2: 3:00 p.m. – 4:00 p.m.
31	7	13 August 2016	Day 2: 4:00 p.m. – 5:00 p.m.
32	8	14 August 2016	Day 2: 5:00 p.m. – 6:00 p.m.
33	9	20 August 2016	Day 2: 6:00 p.m. – 7:00 p.m.
34	10	21 August 2016	Day 2: 7:00 p.m. – 8:00 p.m.
35	11	27 August 2016	Day 2: 8:00 p.m. – 9:00 p.m.
36	12	28 August 2016	Day 2: 9:00 p.m. – 10:00 p.m.
37	13	3 September 2016	Day 2: 10:00 p.m. – 11:00 p.m.
38	14	4 September 2016	Day 2: 11:00 p.m. – 12:00 a.m.
39	15	10 September 2016	Day 2: 12:00 a.m. – 1:00 a.m.
40	16	11 September 2016	Day 2: 1:00 a.m. – 2:00 a.m.
41	17	17 September 2016	Day 2: 2:00 a.m. – 3:00 a.m.
42	18	18 September 2016	Day 2: 3:00 a.m. – 4:00 a.m.
43	19	24 September 2016	Day 2: 4:00 a.m. – 5:00 a.m.
44	20	25 September 2016	Day 2: 5:00 a.m. – 6:00 a.m.
45	21	1 October 2016	Day 2: 6:00 a.m. – 7:00 a.m.
46	22	2 October 2016	Day 2: 7:00 a.m. – 8:00 a.m.
47	23	8 October 2016	Day 2: 8:00 a.m. – 9:00 a.m.
48	24	9 October 2016	Day 2: 9:00 a.m. – 10:00 a.m.

== Reception ==
=== Season 1 ===
An article in the UK newspaper The Independent stated that it was one of the most expensive TV shows ever produced in India and the first to have a major Bollywood star in the lead. The Gulf News praised its production values and writing.

Rediff awarded the show 3.5/5 stars and stated that "The plotting: Two sisters, a man who's had a plastic surgery, a vicious boss, an airplane bombing, the sinister face of 24. What doesn't work? The dialogues. They're clunky, contrived, filmi and, at times, little more than a tacky translation. And this shortcoming ruins some potentially strong scenes or disconnects from the steadily brewing tension. While somewhat underwhelmed by the debut episode, I was hooked to the fast-paced, unflinchingly fierce (chopped finger, et al.), action-packed momentum of the second. 24's premise is such, every episode inches closer to a disclosure. It may not have the finish of the original but when you look at the bigger picture, Anil Kapoor's new show is a step in a desperately needed direction."

The Telegraph stated "... a big thumbs up to its well-chosen cast. Every actor fits perfectly into his or her role, with a special mention for Mandira Bedi's Nikita, Neil Bhoopalam's Aditya and Tisca Chopra's Trisha."

=== Season 2 ===
Anil Kapoor, who was back with Season 2 of 24, received positive feedback from the viewers for his fresh outing. The actor was grateful for the critical acclaim he has been getting and makes sure he replies to every tweet that mentions him or 24. Critics praised Anil Kapoor, Sikander Kher, Raaghav Chanana and Ashish Vidyarthi for their acting skills. Parmita Uniyal of India Today stated "It's dark, it's uncomfortable, it will leave you asking for more".
