= Agneya Singh =

Indian filmmaker and screenwriter (born 1989)

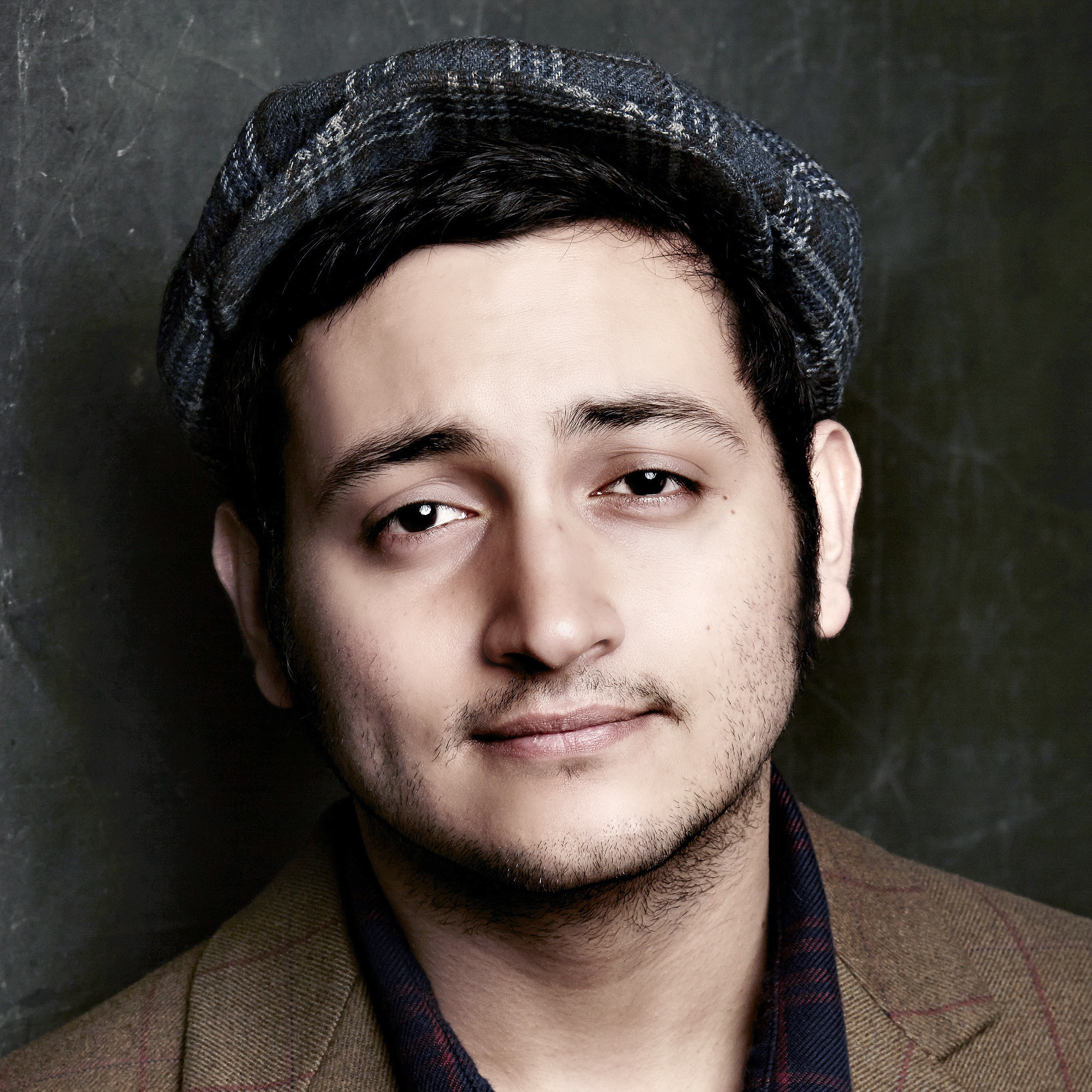
- Agneya Singh
- Born: 21 July 1989 (age 36); New Delhi, India
- Occupations: Filmmaker, Producer, Screenwriter
- Years active: 2007–present
- Notable work: M Cream
- Website: agneyasingh.com

Agneya Singh is an Indian filmmaker and screenwriter. He is best known for writing and directing M Cream.

== Life and career ==
=== Early life ===
Agneya Singh was born in New Delhi, India on 21 July 1989. After working as a photographer and documentary filmmaker, Singh enrolled in NYU Tisch School of the Arts. It was during this time that he assisted filmmaker Lynne Sachs and worked as a projectionist in the experimental Film/TV department at New York University.

His student films and videos have been screened in New York at Anthology Film Archives.

=== First Feature: M Cream ===
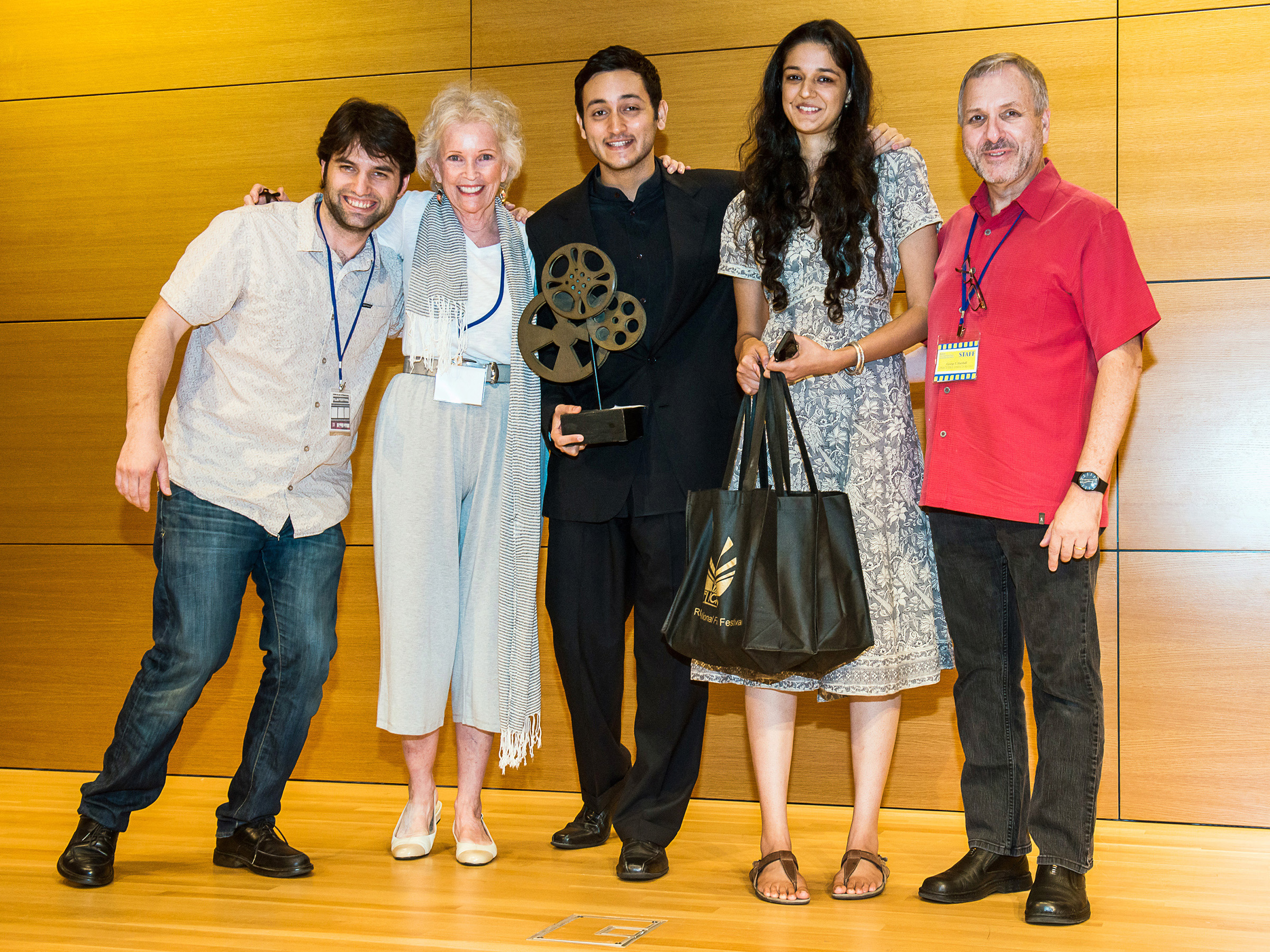
M Cream wins Best Feature at RIIFF

Singh wrote and directed the Indian independent feature film M Cream starring Imaad Shah, Ira Dubey, Barry John and Tom Alter among others. Shot on location in New Delhi and Himachal Pradesh, M Cream follows the exploits of four friends who set out in pursuit of a mythic drug.

M Cream premiered at the Rhode Island International Film Festival in 2014 where it received the ‘Best Feature Film’ award. The film continued to travel to several international festivals throughout 2014 and 2015.

"M Cream" was released theatrically in India on 22 July 2016 by PVR Pictures. The worldwide rights were subsequently acquired by Netflix.
