= Rangrezz =

2013 film by Priyadarshan

- Theatrical release poster
- Directed by: Priyadarshan
- Written by: Mushtaq Shiekh
- Story by: Samuthirakani
- Based on: Naadodigal by Samuthirakani
- Produced by: Vashu Bhagnani
- Starring: Jackky Bhagnani; Priya Anand; Raaghav Chanana; Vijay Varma
- Cinematography: Santosh Sivan
- Edited by: T. S. Suresh
- Music by: Songs: Sajid–Wajid; Background Score & Guest Composition: Sundar C Babu
- Production company: Pooja Entertainment
- Distributed by: UTV Motion Pictures
- Release date: 21 March 2013
- Country: India
- Language: Hindi
- Box office: ₹6.37 crore

Rangrezz (transl. Dyer) is a 2013 Indian Hindi-language action drama film directed by Priyadarshan starring Jackky Bhagnani, Priya Anand, Raaghav Chanana, and Vijay Varma. The film is an official remake of the 2009 Tamil film Naadodigal. The film was titled by Shah Rukh Khan, who had registered it through his production company Red Chillies Entertainment. The film was produced by Vashu Bhagnani under his production banner Pooja Entertainment. Priyadarshan and Santosh Sivan worked together on this film for the first time since Kaalapani (1996). The film was released on 21 March 2013.

== Plot ==
The movie begins with the introduction of Rishi Deshpande (Jackky Bhagnani), a good-hearted young man living in Mumbai. Rishi shares a close bond with his two childhood friends, Winu (Vijay Verma) and Pakkya (Amitosh Nagpal). They are inseparable, always supporting each other in tough situations. Rishi is in a loving relationship with his girlfriend, Megha (Priya Anand), and they are planning to get married and settle down soon.

Rishi gets a call from an old friend, Joy (Raghav), who is in deep distress. Joy tells Rishi that he's in love with a girl named Jasmine, but her family has arranged her marriage to someone else. The wedding is just days away, and Joy begs Rishi to help him elope with Jasmine.

At first, Rishi hesitates, knowing how serious the consequences of such an act could be. But eventually, driven by his sense of loyalty to an old friend, he agrees. Winu and Pakkya also reluctantly agree, despite their doubts.

Rishi and his friends come up with a meticulous plan to kidnap Jasmine right before her wedding. They scout the location, track the schedules, and make preparations to execute the plan with precision. Tensions are high, but the group pushes forward, driven by the belief that they are helping a friend in need.

On the day of the wedding, Rishi, Winu, and Pakkya manage to carry out the daring plan and successfully kidnap Jasmine, sneaking her out without being caught. The trio, along with Joy, feels triumphant after pulling off such a risky endeavor. They believe they've done something great, reuniting two lovers against all odds.

After the kidnapping, Joy and Jasmine get married, and at first, everything seems perfect. Joy is thrilled to be with the woman he loves, and Rishi and his friends believe they've done the right thing by standing by their friend. The atmosphere is celebratory, and the friends think all the drama is behind them.

However, things take a sharp turn for the worse. Joy and Jasmine's relationship starts deteriorating quickly. They fight constantly, and their romanticized love story begins to crumble under the weight of reality. Joy feels trapped in a marriage that's filled with bitterness, and Jasmine resents him for alienating her from her family.

The emotional toll of their toxic relationship begins to affect everyone, especially Rishi and his friends, who start to regret their involvement. They realize that sometimes interfering in personal relationships—even with good intentions—can lead to disastrous consequences.

As Joy and Jasmine's marriage continues to fall apart, the consequences for Rishi, Winu, and Pakkya become even more severe. Jasmine's family, furious about the elopement, comes after the friends with vengeance. This leads to a violent confrontation where Rishi's friends suffer life-altering injuries.

Winu loses his leg in the brutal clash, forever disabling him and altering the course of his life. His carefree attitude is replaced by despair, knowing he'll never be the same again.

Pakkya loses hearing in one ear as a result of the violent altercation. The permanent injury leaves him deeply regretting the group's decision to intervene in Joy's relationship.

The physical injuries to Winu and Pakkya mirror the emotional trauma that all three friends endure. Their lives are now filled with pain, regret, and guilt for getting involved in Joy's love story. The deep bond they shared is now shattered by the consequences of their actions.

Rishi, carrying the heavy burden of guilt, confronts the reality of their failed mission to unite Joy and Jasmine. The love story they tried to protect has disintegrated, and the friends have paid the price for their impulsive decision. The confrontations, the attacks, and the constant threats from Jasmine's family culminate in Rishi understanding how destructive their intervention was.

In the end, Joy and Jasmine separate, and their marriage ends in failure. Joy is left devastated, realizing that what he thought was love was nothing more than an illusion. Rishi, Winu, and Pakkya, physically and emotionally scarred, reflect on their actions.

Winu and Pakkya's injuries serve as a painful reminder of how everything went wrong. Rishi, too, realizes the true value of his own relationship with Megha. He understands that love cannot be forced or manipulated and that it requires patience, understanding, and mutual respect—something that was sorely lacking in Joy and Jasmine's relationship.

The movie ends with Rishi and his friends trying to move on from the mess they've created. Their friendship, once strong and unbreakable, is now burdened by the weight of their poor decisions. They are left to live with the physical and emotional scars, forever changed by the events that unfolded.

== Cast ==
- Jackky Bhagnani as Rishi Deshpande
- Priya Anand as Megha Joshi
- Rajpal Yadav as Man Singh
- Raaghav Chanana as Joy Chaturvedi
- Amitosh Nagpal as Vinod "Vinu"
- Vijay Varma as Pakkya
- Akshara Gowda as Jasmine Pande
- Rishikesh Deshpande as Chacha Chaudhari
- Pankaj Tripathi as Brijbihari Pande
- Lushin Dubey as Rati Chaturvedi
- Sunil Sinha as Devdutta Deshpande
- Sona Nair as Devyani Deshpande
- Sakhi Gokhale as Venu
- Milind Wagh as Major
- Milind Phatak as Carpenter

== Soundtrack ==
Rangrezz

Soundtrack album by Sajid–Wajid Sundar C Babu
- Released: 20 February 2013
- Recorded: 2012
- Genre: Feature film soundtrack
- Length: 23:23
- Language: Hindi
- Label: Sony Music India
- Producer: Sajid–Wajid

Sajid–Wajid chronology
Chashme Baddoor (2013)	Rangrezz (2013)	Ishkq in Paris (2013)

Three songs are composed by Sajid–Wajid. Composer Sundar C. Babu (who composed for the original Tamil film) makes his debut in Hindi with two songs. Musicperk.com rated the album 7/10 quoting "Another predictable album from Sajid–Wajid". The film also features the song "Gangnam Style", sung by PSY. "Yaaro Aisa Hai" was loosely based on "Ulagil Yentha Kathal" from the original Tamil film.

All lyrics are written by Sameer Anjaan.

Track list
No.	Title	Music	Singer(s)	Length
1.	"Dil Ko Aaya Sukoon"	Sajid–Wajid	Rahat Fateh Ali Khan & Hiral Brahmbhatt	4:41
2.	"Govinda Aala Re"	Sajid–Wajid	Wajid Ali	4:36
3.	"Shiv Shambho"	Sundar C. Babu	Wajid Khan	4:35
4.	"Yaaron Aisa Hai"	Sundar C. Babu	Salim Merchant	4:58
Total length:				23:23

== Release ==
The movie was released on 21 March 2013, on the festive season of Holi. The film was cleared with a U/A certificate from the CBFC after a total of 18 cuts. The BBFC gave it a 12A rating for moderate violence and gore.

== Critical reception ==
On release Rangrezz got positive reviews from critics. Ankur Pathak from Rediff.com gave the film 3/5 stars, and said Rangrezz works despite being saddled with a rather clichéd plot. NDTV also similarly rated 3/5, calling it Priyadarshan's "best work in years". Bollywood life rated it 3/5 and said "Priyadarshan's realistic take on friendship is commendable". Filmfare rated it 3/5, thus responding positively. Zee News also similarly rated the movie 3/5, along with a positive verdict. Sify similarly rated it 3/5, along with the statement "Cupid's arrow has never struck a deadlier blow". Daiji World rated the movie 3/5, also responding positively.

== Box office ==
Rangrezz, despite getting positive reviews, did not repeat the same success of Naadodigal. The film had an average opening and collected Rs. 10 million on the first day of its release, along with collecting Rs. 40 million in its opening weekend. The film collected a total of Rs. 6.37 crores in its lifetime run at the box office.
