= M Cream =

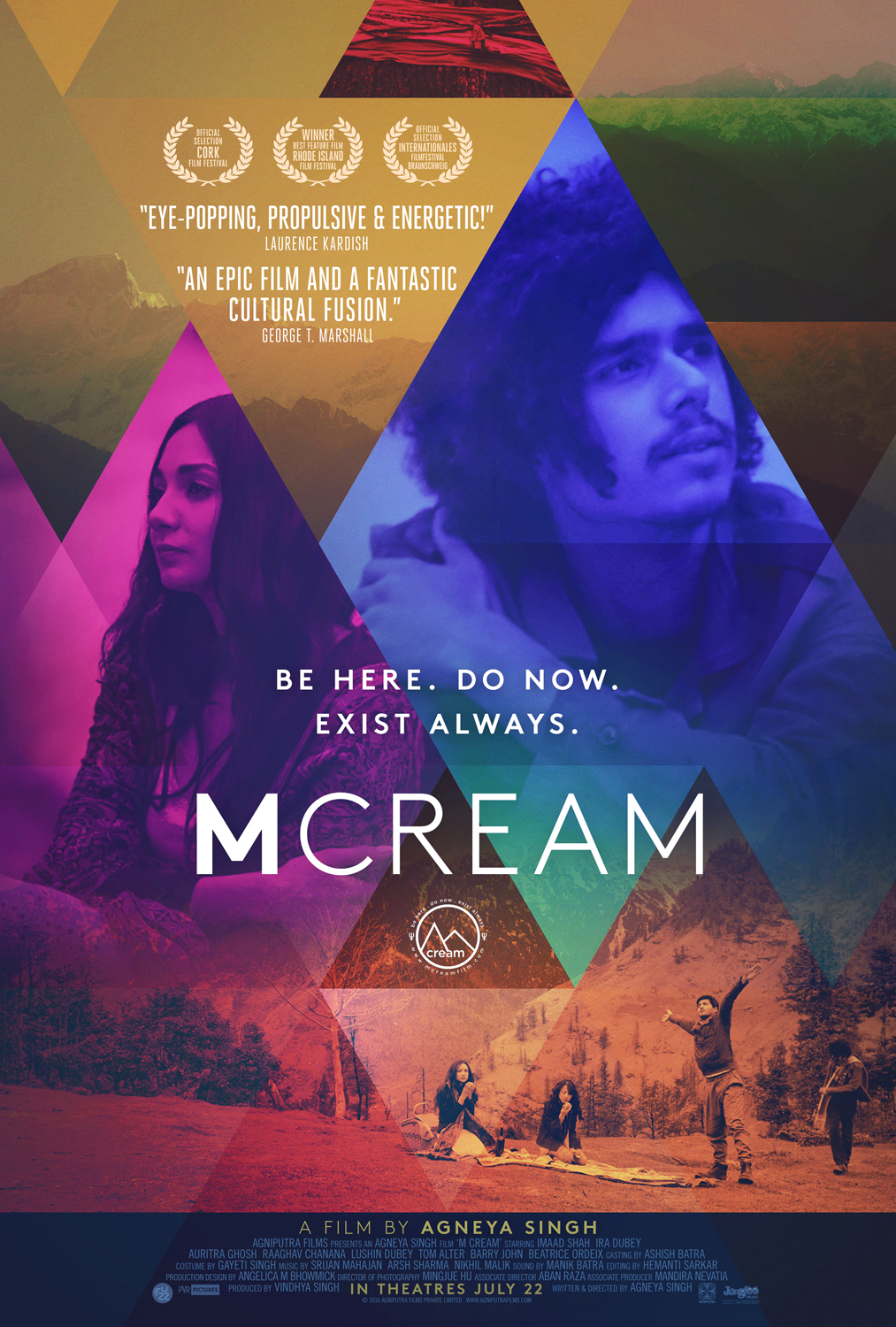
- Directed by: Agneya Singh
- Written by: Agneya Singh
- Produced by: Agniputra Films
- Starring: Imaad Shah; Ira Dubey; Raaghav Chanana; Auritra Ghosh; Tom Alter; Barry John
- Distributed by: All Rights Entertainment
- Release dates: August 10, 2014 (Rhode Island Film Festival); July 22, 2016 (India)
- Running time: 114 minutes
- Country: India
- Language: English/Hindi

M Cream is a 2014 Indian Hindi-language road film written and directed by Agneya Singh. It follows the exploits of four rebellious friends who set out on a road trip in pursuit of a mythical drug. The film was screened at the Rhode Island International Film Festival, where it received the Grand Prize for Best Feature Film. PVR Pictures released M Cream in theaters across India on July 22, 2016. The worldwide distribution rights were subsequently acquired by Netflix.

== Plot ==
Figs is the typical cynic who lurks in the expansive lawns of Delhi University. Entangled in a web of drugged out delirium, he’s the quintessential rebel. His world is thrown into disarray when his conservative parents begin to chalk out a strategy for his future. Things only become worse when a sudden scarcity of hash deprives Figs of his favourite pastime. Unable to cope with the situation, Figs joins forces with his best friend Maggie on a quest to attain M Cream, a mythical form of hash. They hastily devise a plan to trek to the far reaches of the Himalayas in pursuit of this goal. Maggie ropes in her boyfriend Niz, who’s purportedly headed to the hills on a photo assignment. Unbeknownst to Figs, the trio is joined by Jay, a close friend of Niz. Chaos ensues as the reckless travelers journey across the Himalayan expanse. The road trip results in a series of unexpected encounters that begin to unravel the myriad realities of rebellion. Difficult choices are made and uncomfortable sides are taken as Figs and the others begin to comprehend the mysterious ways of the world we live in.

== Cast ==
- Imaad Shah as Figs
- Ira Dubey as Jay
- Raaghav Chanana as Niz
- Auritra Ghosh as Maggie
- Barry John as Vishnu Das
- Tom Alter as Mr Bhardwaj
- Lushin Dubey as Mrs Bhardwaj
- Beatrice Ordeix as Marie Sartre

== Production ==
=== Development ===
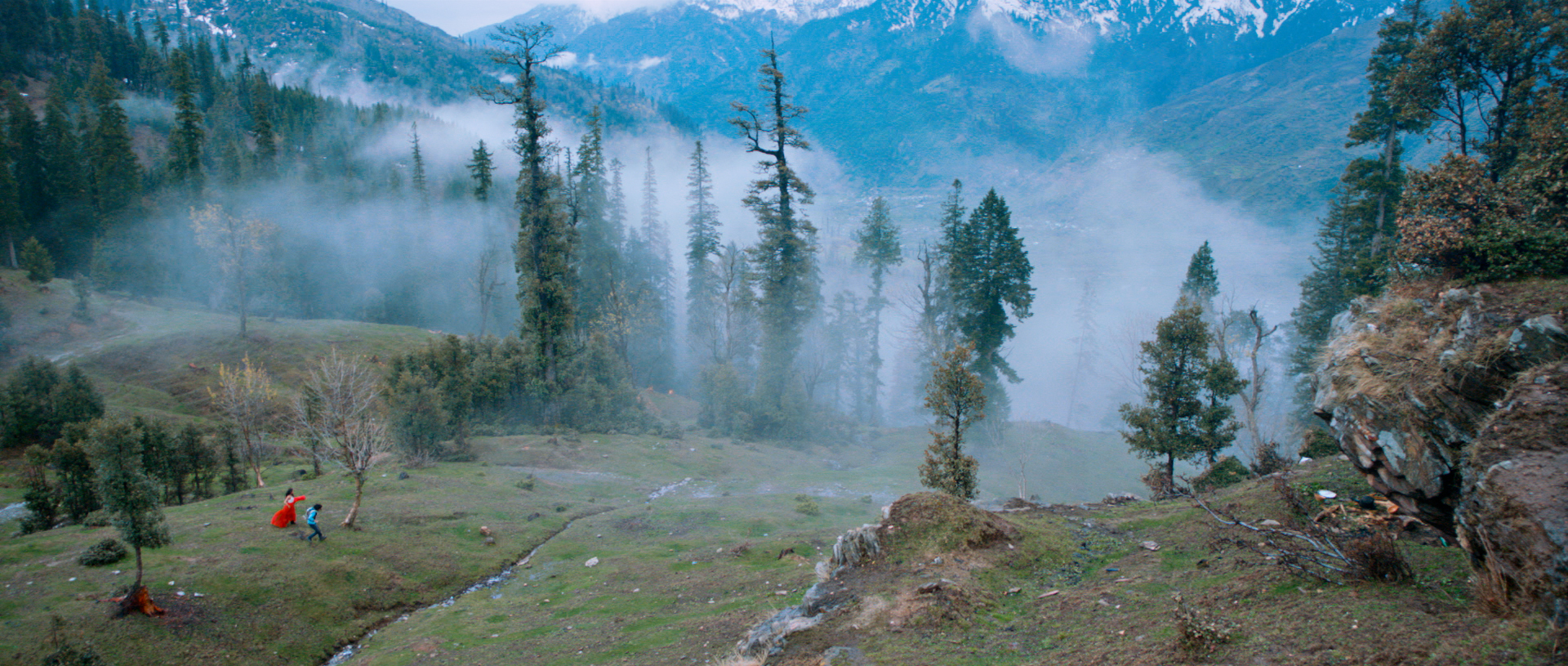
A still from M Cream

Singh is an alumnus of NYU Tisch School of the Arts. Upon graduation, he returned to India and began conceptualizing the script for M Cream, his first feature film. In conversation with Indo-Asian News Service, Singh commented:

"After growing up in the superficial '90s, I was struck by the resurgence of radicalism among the youth of India. This film is really an ode to the spirit of revolution, inspired by the brave and reckless defiance of my own peers and contemporaries."

Highlighting a departure from the traditional tropes of Bollywood storytelling, in an interview with NPR Singh observed:

"Bollywood entertains millions of people, but for me, personally, I couldn't really relate to the dreams and ideas in it. It's really based on escapism. And the fact of the matter is, we are living in turbulent times, and I think there's an audience in India, and internationally as well, that wants to see the more realistic aspects of what's happening in the country rather than the version of what we would like to believe."

The story of M Cream follows the exploits of four friends in search of a magical drug. Through this journey, the film explores various socio-political issues from a youth perspective.

A cast of theatre and film actors including Raaghav Chanana, Tom Alter, Ira Dubey, Imaad Shah, Auritra Ghosh and Barry John joined the project. The film was produced by Agniputra Films, a multi-media production house based in New Delhi, India. Hong Kong based sales agent All Rights Entertainment came on board to represent the project internationally.

=== Filming ===
M Cream was shot on location in New Delhi and Himachal Pradesh. Most notably the filming took place in and around the Kullu and Manali in Kullu district of Himachal Pradesh including popular backpacking locales such as Kasol and Malana.

== Soundtrack ==
The score for M Cream was composed by Studio Fuzz, consisting of Srijan Mahajan, Arsh Sharma and Nikhil Malik. It features Indian classical singer Shubha Mudgal, Brazilian pop star Lili Rocha and French folk-rock group Moriarty.

== Reception ==
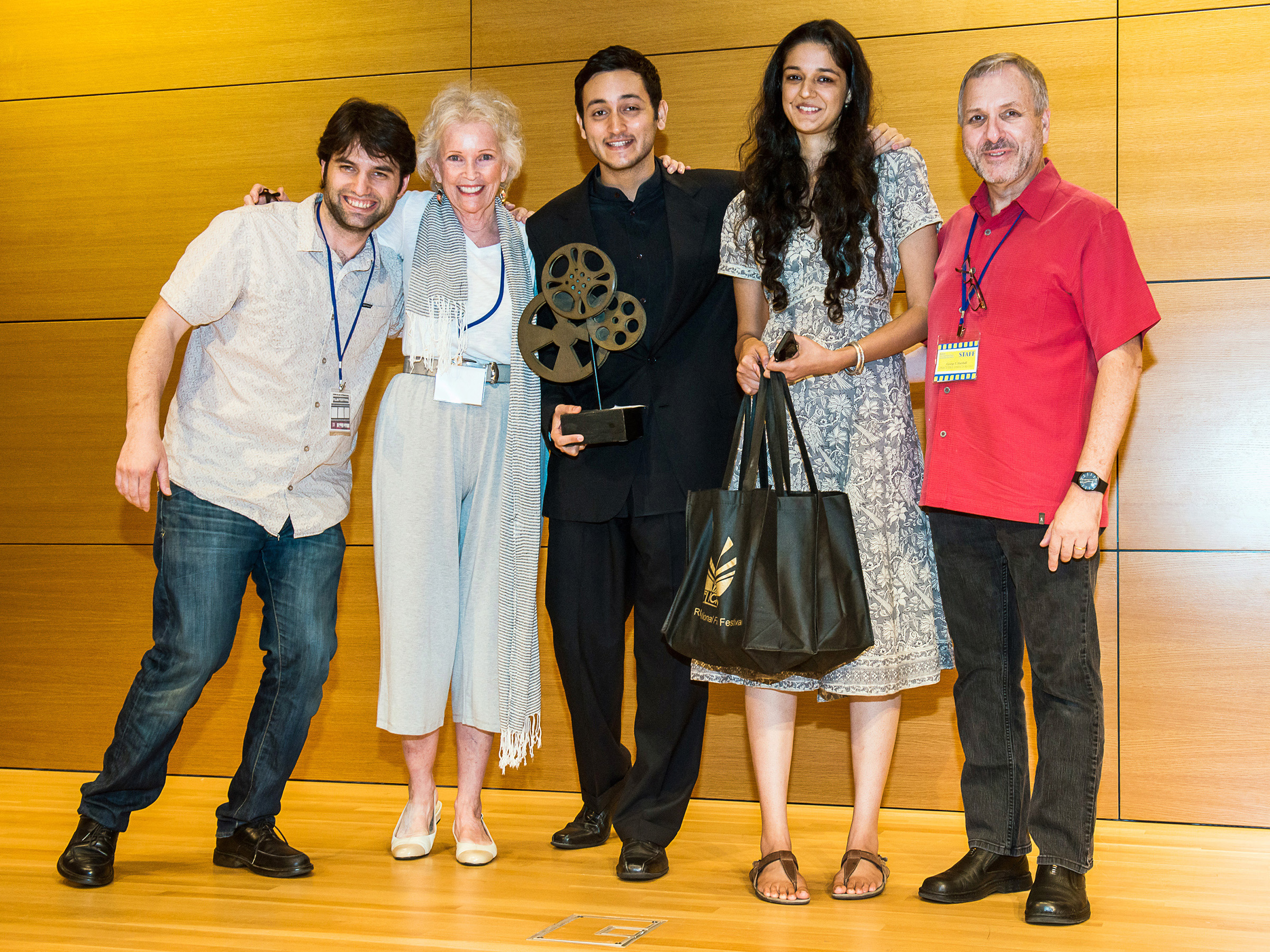
M Cream wins Best Feature at RIIFF.

M Cream premiered at the Rhode Island International Film Festival in 2014 where it received the 'Best Feature Film' award. The film traveled to several international festivals. Most notably, the film has been screened at Cork Film Festival, WorldFest-Houston International Film Festival Internationales Filmfest Braunschweig Indie Spirit Film Festival, FilmColumbia Festival, London Indian Film Festival, New York Indian Film Festival, Chicago South Asian Film Festival, Seattle South Asian Film Festival, Arizona International Film Festival, Oakland International Film Festival and Boston International Film Festival.

Laurence Kardish, curator emeritus of MOMA, commented:

"A refreshing, vivid and occasionally delirious road trip of a film into Dharamshala, and beyond into the snowy mountains and canopied forests of Himachal Pradesh where four young and attractive millennials from New Delhi hope their treasure hunt for a fabled stimulant will end blissfully. Directed with verve and panache by NYU graduate Agneya Singh, M Cream, is not only a wildly promising debut feature film, but an eye-popping, propulsive and energetic hybrid of American independent and Bollywood filmmaking."

The film was released in India by PVR Pictures on 22 July 2016. Rohit Vats of Hindustan Times commented, "M Cream is a raw voice of an energetic director." Mohar Basu of Times of India observed, "M Cream is incomprehensible in parts, poignant in others but it is mostly a pointless movie. Though brimming with raw energy, the narrative lacks vision to use it right."

== Awards ==
Wins

- Grand Prize for Best Feature Film, Rhode Island International Film Festival
- Best Foreign Feature, Indie Spirit Film Festival
- Platinum REMI, WorldFest-Houston International Film Festival
- Yellow Rose, Jaipur International Film Festival
- Honorable Mention, New Jersey Film Festival

Nominations

- Audience Award, London Indian Film Festival
- Best Feature Film, Seattle South Asian Film Festival
- Best Feature Film, River to River. Florence Indian Film Festival
- Best Feature Film, Delhi International Film Festival
- Best Actress, Madrid International Film Festival

Accolades

- One of the Top 10 Indie Movies of 2014 by Pepsi MTV Indies
- One of the "must-see movies" at San Antonio Film Festival by San Antonio Express-News

== Political and social issues ==
Focusing on a realistic appraisal of society and polity, M Cream touches upon several taboo subjects that are indicative of contemporary forms of rebellion. Most notably, the film has portrayed the widespread use of drugs among the youth. Speaking to India Today, Singh commented:

"Hash is hugely popular among the youth and on campuses. It's a counter-cultural movement sweeping our country where the youth is pushing the limits of society and rebelling against social, economic and political uncertainties."

M Cream provides a socio-political commentary on modern India with an emphasis on understanding the role of rebellion in the ongoing struggle to affect change. In an interview with Indo-Asian News Service, Singh further stated:

"I think that we need to bring cinema back into the socio-political sphere and wield it once again as a weapon of the revolution. M Cream is our very own protest against the rising tide of conformity."
