= Zubaan =

2015 Indian film by Mozez Singh

- Directed by: Mozez Singh
- Story by: Mozez Singh
- Produced by: Guneet Monga; Shaan Vyas; Mozez Singh
- Starring: Vicky Kaushal; Sarah Jane Dias; Raaghav Chanana
- Cinematography: Swapnil S. Sonawane
- Edited by: Deepa Bhatia
- Music by: Ashutosh Phatak
- Release dates: 1 October 2015 (Busan); 4 March 2016 (India)
- Running time: 115 minutes
- Country: India
- Languages: Hindi; Punjabi

Zubaan (transl. Promise or voice) is a 2015 Indian musical drama film written and directed by Mozez Singh, starring Vicky Kaushal, Sarah Jane Dias and Raaghav Chanana, with music composed by Ashutosh Phatak.

The film is the coming of age story of a young boy Dilsher (Vicky Kaushal) who loses his faith and develops a fear of music, and of his journey in fighting that fear and finding himself.

== Plot ==
The story starts with the flashbacks of a young man, Dilsher (Vicky Kaushal) who grew up in a village in Gurdaspur, Punjab. His father used to recite Shabad Kirtan in Gurudwaras, but after his death, Dilsher has developed a fear of music. He instead grows up with a speech impairment and stammers. He comes to Delhi to meet a businessman, Gurcharan "Guru" Sikand (Manish Choudhary), who is often referred to as the Lion of Gurdaspur.

A flashback speaks of how, while being bullied by some of his schoolmates, Dilsher met a young Gurcharan who told him about how life often becomes cruel to people, and how one should fight back. He even gives Dilsher a pen, which is symbolic of Gurcharan's own struggles, and his audacity to write his own destiny. Dilsher is encouraged to write his own destiny in Delhi.

Dilsher befriends Tulsi Ram, the leader of a workforce employed in one of Gurcharan's projects, and learns more about Gurcharan from Tulsi Ram. Thereafter, he joins a security agency in hopes of getting to Kapoor Sikand Industries Limited, better known as KSIL, which is owned by Gurcharan. However, he lands a job at a music show, and notices a young girl, Amira (Sarah Jane Dias) dancing to a song.

A bouncer, Yadav, is assigned duty at KSIL for the next day. Dilsher begs Yadav to swap positions with him, but Yadav mocks Dilsher for being too enthusiastic, verily questioning his own sensibilities. As a last straw, Dilsher injures Yadav and announces himself as a substitute. While trying to settle an agreement between Tulsi Ram's workforce and Gurcharan's son Surya Sikand (Raaghav Chanana), he eventually manages to meet Gurcharan, and reminds him of the pen he gave him. Surprised that a stranger would have known him better than his family, Gurcharan is rendered nostalgic, and begins playing a CD of the songs he used to hear in Gurdaspur days.

Tulsi Ram is given a hefty sum to help with his sons' studies. The sum is delivered via Dilsher, who uncannily and sinisterly puts a hidden sum in the same red bag. Sometime later, Dilsher shifts to the construction site where Tulsi Ram works. Surya is angry but much to his shock, Gurcharan orders his assistant Ajmani to arrange a room beside on his own estate for Dilsher.

Surya takes Dilsher to a party, where he meets Amira. She happens to be Surya's friend, but when Surya tries to mock Dilsher, Amira rebukes him. Amira later mentions an event named Dhruvtara, which Surya wants to attend, but Amira refuses, citing that Dhruvtara is only for people who have been close friends to her and Dhruv. Just as he is leaving, Dilsher is attacked by a few thugs sent by Surya who threaten Dilsher, asking him to leave the estate.

Dilsher visits Amira in the meantime, bringing some bananas for her, and learns that she is preparing for Dhruvtara. Both of them get high on alcohol, and the next morning, Amira discovers Dilsher singing. She falls asleep, and wakes up soon, only to end up stopping Dilsher, who however admits that he is not interested in singing. Amira then reveals that he does not stammer while singing, which soon compels Dilsher to recall his childhood with his father.

Seeing how much Dilsher knows about him, Gurcharan bonds quickly with him, giving him a higher preference over Surya, much to the chagrin of Surya's mother Mandira "Mandy" Sikand (Meghna Malik). Mandy orders Gurcharan to fire Dilsher because Surya doesn't like him, but it falls on deaf ears. Dilsher still remains loyal to Gurcharan. That night, after an argument between Mandy and Gurcharan, Dilsher is brutally attacked by some goons who seem to have been sent by Surya. However, this time, Dilsher challenges Surya, vowing that he will become a big man, and that Surya is nothing like his father. A broken Surya then ceases communication with Gurcharan, who is already angry with him for having sent the goons.

Dilsher meets Amira again, this time on his own. He learns that Dhruv was Amira's brother, who for a reason did not like Surya, but was very reactive and aggressive when drunk. During a party, he accidentally fell into a swimming pool and died. After a few days, Gurcharan hosts a party where the Les Twins are to perform. Dilsher tries to apologize to Surya, but leaves him alone in a weak moment. Meanwhile, Gurcharan is furious when he notices Mehta at the party, trying to meet with Mandy, who but warns Gurcharan against creating a scene, and he leaves in disgust.

Dilsher is confronted by Gurcharan and soon reveals that he was the one who injured Yadav to meet him, and Gurcharan, in turn, reveals a number of truths to him: Surya is actually Mandy's son with Mehta, and that Mehta actually belonged earlier to the Kapoor family from KSIL, which is why he doesn't love Surya and Mandy. However, Dilsher is devastated to learn that the goons that day were actually sent by Gurcharan, and not Surya. After a lengthy conversation, Dilsher realizes that KSIL is not the place for him. Instead, he picks up at Amira during her performance with the dancer duo. As the song ends, the two share a kiss.

Recalling through another flashback how his father developed a speech impairment that led to his banishment from the Gurudwara and ultimately desolation resulting in suicide, Dilsher finally lets go of it all as he realizes the lesson Amira gave him on music and life. He leaves Gurcharan for a new life, thus also incriminating Gurcharan with Surya and Mandy. Although he is arrested and imprisoned upon arrival in Gurdaspur under charges pressed by Gurcharan, he is soon released, and writes a message to Amira, finally reuniting with her in the end.

== Cast ==
Star Cast	Movie Character
Vicky Kaushal	Dilsher
Sarah Jane Dias	Amira
Raaghav Chanana	Surya Sikand
Manish Choudhary	Gurucharan Sikand
Meghna Malik	Mandira Sikand
Harmehroz Singh	Young Dilsher
Malkit Rauni	Dilsher's Father
Anita Shabdeesh	Dilsher's Mother
Chittaranjan Tripathy	Ajmani
Rajeev Gaur Singh	H.P. Mehta
Raj Sharma	Tulsi Ram
Kunal Sharma	Yadav
Abhimanyu Garg	Hafiz
Paras Sharma	Dhruv

== Production ==
The shooting for Zubaan began in March 2014. A major part of the shooting took place in Delhi, Punjab and Rajasthan, while the last phase was shot in Mumbai. In Punjab the film was shot in Kila Raipur & Pathankot and in Rajasthan the shooting took place at the Sambar desert.

Zubaan's costumes were designed by Aki Narula, who was the costume designer of Kill Dil, Highway, and Rockstar.

The choreography was done by Uma Gaiti. One of the songs in the film features the choreographers-dancers Les Twins.

== Accolades ==
Zubaan opened the 20th edition of the Busan International Film Festival. This was the first time that a mainstream Bollywood film opened the biggest film festival in Asia.

Here the director of the film, Mozez Singh, won the 'Rising Director Asia Star Award'.

== Music ==
The soundtrack of Zubaan was composed by Ashutosh Phatak. Lyrics were written by Varun Grover, Ashutosh Phatak, and Surjit Patar. The first song "Music is My Art" (Niamat Salaamat) was released on 20 January 2016. The second song "Ajj Saanu O Mileya" (The Anthem of Dreams) sung by Mandar Deshpande was released on 8 February 2016.
