= 24 season 2 =

24
- Season 2
- Promotional poster
- Starring: Kiefer Sutherland; Sarah Wynter; Elisha Cuthbert; Xander Berkeley; Penny Johnson Jerald; Carlos Bernard; Dennis Haysbert
- No. of episodes: 24

Release
- Original network: Fox
- Original release: October 29, 2002 – May 20, 2003

Season chronology
- ← Previous; Season 1 Next → Season 3

The second season of the American drama television series 24, also known as Day 2, was first broadcast from October 29, 2002, to May 20, 2003, on Fox. The season begins and ends at 8:00 a.m. The season premiere originally aired without commercial interruption, and has an extended running time of approximately 51 minutes, as opposed to the standard 43 minutes.

== Season overview ==
The second season is set 18 months after season one. The season's main plot follows the work of now-President of the United States of America David Palmer and Counter Terrorist Unit Agent Jack Bauer to stop terrorists from detonating a nuclear bomb in Los Angeles. Introduced into the situation is Kate Warner, a woman who ends up getting vital information related to CTU's mission.

This season can essentially be broken into two acts:

1. The first act involves CTU attempting to stop a Middle Eastern terrorist cell from detonating a nuclear bomb in Los Angeles.
2. In the second act, Jack and the CTU try to prevent a misdirected retaliatory strike from the U.S. by investigating a possibly forged piece of evidence.

=== Major subplots ===
- Following the death of his wife and his unborn baby at the end of Season 1, Jack Bauer retires from CTU.
- Kim is on the run, having rescued a young girl from her abusive father.
- Kate Warner suspects that her sister's Middle Eastern fiancé is a terrorist.
- CTU is blown up with C4 to cripple its ability to find the bomb.
- George Mason, Director of CTU, is exposed to a lethal dose of radiation.
- Jack tries to repair his relationship with his daughter Kim and spends much of the day worrying about her safety.
- Jack develops a heart condition after being tortured by terrorists.
- President Palmer faces traitors in his own cabinet, who attempt to remove him from power to advance their own agenda.
- The personal relationship between Tony Almeida and Michelle Dessler begins to develop.
- The relationship between Jack Bauer and Kate Warner also begins to develop.

=== Summary ===
The season starts and ends at: 8:00 a.m. (L.A. time); the first scene of the season occurs in Seoul, South Korea (midnight, Seoul time).

The first fifteen hours deal with finding and disposing of the nuclear bomb. After the bomb is detonated away from the city, the story focuses on the United States' response to the thwarted attack, and in particular the nation's retaliation against the people responsible for planning it. A recorded conversation between a terrorist involved with the bomb and high-ranking officials of three Middle Eastern countries (which are never specified) is used to implicate those countries in the plot. However, due to Jack Bauer's doubts, Palmer is reluctant to order military action against them until he has absolute proof that the recording is genuine. A majority of his Cabinet then vote to relieve Palmer of his position as president under Section 4 of the Twenty-fifth Amendment, believing his hesitation to be a sign of indecision and weakness, and therefore indicative of his inability to lead the country effectively. The vice president, James Prescott, is elevated to the presidency and orders military strikes against the three countries to continue.

Jack, Michelle and Tony race to find the evidence that the recording is a forgery, resulting in the discovery that a group of European and American businessmen fabricated it in order to wage war with the Middle East, and planned to benefit from the resulting skyrocketing oil prices. Once the evidence is produced, the strikes are called off and Palmer is reinstated as president, thanks largely to his ex-wife Sherry Palmer who is persuaded by Jack to risk her life to secure the evidence (she had been involved in the conspiracy). The eight cabinet members and Vice President tender their resignations (Palmer does not accept them), and Palmer then tells his staff that he believes that the strictest evidence of hostile intent is required before waging war. The President does, however, relieve his Chief of Staff Mike Novick, who did not support him until the eleventh hour, despite being his most trusted confidant.

Like in Season One, Season Two ends with a surprise twist. The nuclear bomb situation is resolved without massive loss of life (besides George Mason, who had radiation poisoning and convinced Jack to let him fly the plane) but President Palmer collapses after giving a speech, having been attacked with a biological weapon by Mandy in an assassination attempt. Viewers were forced to wait until the third season to see whether Palmer survived the attack. The sudden shift from a nuclear to biological threat also foreshadows the third season, which initially centers on the threat of an engineered virus being set loose on the public.

24: The Game dealt with the time between Seasons Two and Three. President Palmer is incapacitated from the biological weapon inflicted by Mandy, and many of the duties are being handled by his vice president.

== Characters ==
Season 2 main cast: (from left to right, back row) Sarah Wynter, Carlos Bernard, Xander Berkeley, Penny Johnson Jerald, and Dennis Haysbert; (from left to right, front row) Kiefer Sutherland and Elisha Cuthbert

=== Starring ===
- Kiefer Sutherland as Jack Bauer (24 episodes)
- Sarah Wynter as Kate Warner (24 episodes)
- Elisha Cuthbert as Kim Bauer (22 episodes)
- Xander Berkeley as George Mason (15 episodes)
- Penny Johnson Jerald as Sherry Palmer (13 episodes)
- Carlos Bernard as Tony Almeida (24 episodes)
- Dennis Haysbert as President David Palmer (24 episodes)

=== Guest starring ===
- Reiko Aylesworth as Michelle Dessler (24 episodes)
- Jude Ciccolella as Mike Novick (19 episodes)
- Michelle Forbes as Lynne Kresge (18 episodes)
- Laura Harris as Marie Warner (14 episodes)
- John Terry as Bob Warner (12 episodes)
- Lourdes Benedicto as Carrie Turner (10 episodes)
- Phillip Rhys as Reza Naiyeer (10 episodes)
- Harris Yulin as Roger Stanton (9 episodes; uncredited)
- Skye McCole Bartusiak as Megan Matheson (8 episodes)
- Daniel Dae Kim as Tom Baker (8 episodes)
- Billy Burke as Gary Matheson (7 episodes)
- Innis Casey as Miguel (7 episodes)
- Alan Dale as Vice President Jim Prescott (7 episodes)
- Sarah Clarke as Nina Myers (6 episodes)
- Donnie Keshawarz as Yusuf Auda (6 episodes)
- Paul Schulze as Ryan Chappelle (6 episodes)
- Sara Gilbert as Paula Schaeffer (5 episodes)
- Francesco Quinn as Syed Ali (5 episodes)
- Tamlyn Tomita as Jenny Dodge (5 episodes)
- Tobin Bell as Peter Kingsley (4 episodes)
- Timothy Carhart as Eric Rayburn (4 episodes)
- Gregg Henry as Jonathan Wallace (4 episodes)
- Michael Holden as Ron Wieland (4 episodes)
- Michael McGrady as Raymond Brown (4 episodes)
- Tracy Middendorf as Carla Matheson (4 episodes)
- Kevin Dillon as Lonnie McRae (3 episodes)
- Glenn Morshower as Aaron Pierce (3 episodes)
- Douglas O'Keeffe as Eddie Grant (3 episodes)
- Al Sapienza as Paul Koplin (3 episodes)
- Thomas Kretschmann as Max (2 episodes)
- Randle Mell as Brad Hammond (2 episodes)
- Rick D. Wasserman as Alex Hewitt (2 episodes)
- Mia Kirshner as Mandy (1 episode)
- Vicellous Shannon as Keith Palmer (1 episode)
- Eric Christian Olsen as John Mason (1 episode)

== Episodes ==
No. overall	No. in season	Title	Directed by	Written by	Original release date	Prod. code	US viewers (millions)
25	1	"Day 2: 8:00 a.m. – 9:00 a.m."	Jon Cassar	Joel Surnow & Michael Loceff	October 29, 2002	2AFF01	13.50
Eighteen months after the events of Day 1, President David Palmer is informed that a terrorist group called the Second Wave is planning to detonate a nuclear bomb in Los Angeles sometime this day. CTU Los Angeles is ordered to call back resigned agent Jack Bauer, who is trying to talk to his daughter Kim, but she struggles, as seeing him reminds her of her mother's death. After initially refusing to return to CTU, Jack is convinced to by Palmer, and he arrives at CTU, where Director George Mason and agents Tony Almeida, Michelle Dessler, and Paula Schaeffer update the former of the situation. After Jack leaves a message for Kim to get out of the city, he is informed that Joseph Wald, a criminal he previously worked for as cover, is affiliated with Second Wave and there is a witness who will testify against Wald. The witness is brought to CTU, where Jack kills him and prepares for his mission. Kim, who has been living at the Mathesons' house, watching their daughter, Megan, finds out that Megan is abused by her father Gary. Meanwhile, as the Warner family arranges for the wedding of their daughter Marie with Reza Naiyeer, a Middle Eastern man, their other daughter Kate is informed by her private investigator that Reza is apparently affiliated with terrorist organizations.
26	2	"Day 2: 9:00 a.m. – 10:00 a.m."	Jon Cassar	Joel Surnow & Michael Loceff	November 5, 2002	2AFF02	11.88
Jack goes to the location Wald's men work and proves his loyalty by showing them the witness's head, and their boss, Eddie Grant, accepts Jack into the team. Another member still doubts him and searches the criminal record server for Jack's identity, which is found by CTU's hacking into the server, and Grant becomes certain of Jack's loyalty, before taking him on their mission, which is to explode CTU. Palmer meets Ron Wieland, a journalist who is informed by his sources that the threat level has been raised, and tries to convince the journalist not to talk to the press in order to avoid panic, but Weiland refuses and is detained by Secret Service. Kate's investigator requests her help in obtaining information from Reza's passport for him. Gary's wife Carla offers her car so Kim can escape with Megan, but Gary stops the car and the two girls continue on foot, and Kim tells Megan to stay still until she can make sure Gary has lost them. He confronts her and tries to convince her of his benevolence, but she knocks him unconscious and returns to see Megan gone, and starts searching.
27	3	"Day 2: 10:00 a.m. – 11:00 a.m."	James Whitmore, Jr.	Howard Gordon	November 12, 2002	2AFF03	9.88
Jack warns Palmer's assistant, Lynne Kresge, about CTU, and she informs the NSA Deputy Director Eric Rayburn, who convinces her not to warn CTU in order to maintain Jack's cover. Grant's team takes a power supply contractor hostage and forces him to get them inside CTU, which Jack notices not to be evacuated yet. The team poses as contractors and goes in to plant the bombs, while Jack stays to watch the hostage; he frees him and instructs him to go in and warn Almeida. Kresge finally decides to inform Palmer, who orders the evacuation of CTU. As Grant's team leaves, Kim and Megan arrive at CTU as they're evacuating, but the bombs detonate while several agents, including Schaeffer, are still inside. Meanwhile, Mason, having left CTU earlier after receiving a message, joins LAPD to investigate a garage, where he is exposed to the radioactive substance plutonium, and is informed that he only has up to a week before he dies. Gary reports to the police that Kim has kidnapped Megan, while the investigator tells Kate that Reza has certainly been in contact with the terrorists and also tells her to act normal until the authorities, whom he has alerted, arrive.
28	4	"Day 2: 11:00 a.m. – 12:00 p.m."	James Whitmore, Jr.	Remi Aubuchon	November 19, 2002	2AFF04	9.91
After Jack calls Kresge and blames her for the CTU incident, he finds Wald's location, where he kills Grant and his team and heads to the house, capturing Wald and interrogating him until Wald's dog attacks Jack, giving Wald the chance to escape and take refuge in his concrete room. Jack finds breaking the door impossible and manages to convince Wald to open it. He gives Jack the identity of a contact before committing suicide, and Jack finds the contact to be former CTU agent Nina Myers, who is currently imprisoned for her crimes 18 months ago. Meanwhile, Palmer learns from Kresge that Rayburn stopped her, and he fires him. While Mason returns to CTU, Kim takes Megan to a hospital, where the nurse confirms Megan's abuse and believes Kim to be responsible. She calls and informs Carla, who states she is on her way. Kate tells Bob, her father, what she has discovered, but he tells her that Naiyeer is not a terrorist, and he instructs her to go with Reza in his car. She gets scared in the car, believing Naiyeer is on to her, but it is revealed that he only wanted to show her the house he has bought.
29	5	"Day 2: 12:00 p.m. – 1:00 p.m."	Jon Cassar	Gil Grant	November 26, 2002	2AFF05	9.13
Jack informs Mason about Myers, and Mason issues her transfer to CTU where she demands a pardon in exchange for helping them. Palmer tells Jack, whose wife was murdered by Myers, about his decision to pardon her as there is no other choice. Jack finds out about Mason's condition and threatens to reveal it to Division command if Mason doesn't appoint Jack as Myers' handler. Meanwhile, Schaeffer succumbs to her wounds and Almeida leaves to investigate Reza's case. His team arrives at Bob's place and start interrogating Reza, shocking Marie, and Kate explains everything to her. Palmer is joined by Roger Stanton, the NSA Director, and they meet a Middle Eastern ambassador for intel exchange, but the ambassador's helicopter crashes when leaving. Gary arrives at the hospital and forces Kim to leave by threatening to call the police. After getting a call from Jack, who tells her about the bomb, Kim calls Miguel, her boyfriend, and tells him to join her, and when he does, she tells him about the bomb and convinces him to help her break out Megan.
30	6	"Day 2: 1:00 p.m. – 2:00 p.m."	Jon Cassar	Elizabeth M. Cosin	December 3, 2002	2AFF06	11.13
Jack shows the pardon document to Myers, who demands to be released before she reveals information. After Jack threatens to kill her if she doesn't talk, she claims to know the location of a Second Wave insider, and Jack arranges Myers to be transferred to the location. An agent is instructed to accompany them in order to watch Jack, who poisons the agent, rendering him unconscious. Meanwhile, Marie gets angry with Kate for her investigation, while Reza reveals to CTU that Bob instructed him to transfer the funds to Second Wave accounts. David's former wife, Sherry Palmer, visits him and reveals that there has been an evacuation ordered in Los Angeles. David finds out that it was ordered by Stanton, who claims that he believed that to be David's order. David promptly cancels the order, accepts Sherry in his team, and tells her about the bomb. Gary leaves Megan's room to answer a call made by Miguel, and Kim uses the opportunity to take Megan, and despite Gary's attempts to stop them, the trio beats him down and manages to escape.
31	7	"Day 2: 2:00 p.m. – 3:00 p.m."	James Whitmore, Jr.	Virgil Williams	December 10, 2002	2AFF07	9.82
Jack, Myers and other agents arrive at the location that Myers had told them about. Myers is planted a microphone and a camera before she goes in and visits the Second Wave insider. The agents storm in and capture him; Myers tries to escape, but is stopped by Jack, who hesitates to take revenge and she is rearrested. Meanwhile, Bob and Reza are issued for transfer to CTU after Bob is interrogated. Mason calls his son, who dislikes him, and tells him to meet him at CTU, but when his son refuses, Mason brings him in by force, where he reveals his condition and they say goodbye. Mike Novick, David's Chief of Staff, joins him, and David states that he is trying to find Sherry's source. David begins to suspect that Stanton is working against him and teams up with Sherry, Novick and Kresge to investigate Stanton. Kresge begins to dislike Sherry, and their growing tension is witnessed by David, who warns Sherry about her conduct. Kim, Miguel and Megan keep traveling in Gary's car until a policeman stops them, finding Carla's body in it, and he arrests them.
32	8	"Day 2: 3:00 p.m. – 4:00 p.m."	James Whitmore, Jr.	Joel Surnow & Michael Loceff	December 17, 2002	2AFF08	9.42
Myers tries to make the insider talk at the location, but fails. As they get in the plane back to CTU, Myers manages to get a lead on the location of the bomb before she kills the insider, telling Jack that she is the only one to know (the locations of the bomb and of Syed Ali) now, just as the plane is shot by an unknown party. Meanwhile, three Second Wave operatives have an argument while transferring the bomb; two are killed and the third one continues alone. At CTU, Bob reveals to Almeida that he is a CIA consultant and states that he is not a terrorist. Kate meets an analyst who investigates the accounts more, and they find the name Syed Ali, a known terrorist affiliated with Second Wave. As the two leave the house, they are abducted by Second Wave thugs. David notices Wieland, having escaped detainment by an agent's help, revealing his knowledge to the press. Kim tells the policeman, who has brought them to the office, about the bomb, hoping to get released and Megan not be returned to Gary.
33	9	"Day 2: 4:00 p.m. – 5:00 p.m."	Rodney Charters	Howard Gordon	January 7, 2003	2AFF09	9.97
While David accuses Sherry of breaking out Wieland, the plane Jack and Myers are on crashes, and Jack sees military operatives killing the survivors. He and Myers escape and resist until CTU forces arrive and kill the attackers. Having secured a rifle, Myers takes Jack hostage and demands a pardon for an upcoming crime, the murder of Jack. After Jack tells David to accept her demands, Myers reveals the location of Ali. Meanwhile, Reza states that he is ready to cooperate, making Bob angry, and that he needs to go to his office for this, and an agent is instructed to accompany him. Almeida and Dessler find out about Mason's condition and decide to let him remain in charge in his last hours. Sherry and Kresge continue having arguments as their tensions continue growing. Kate and the analyst are brought to Ali, who instructs his henchman to torture the analyst who is eventually killed. The policeman decides to take Kim and Miguel back to Los Angeles, while Megan is entrusted to her aunt and says goodbye to Kim.
34	10	"Day 2: 5:00 p.m. – 6:00 p.m."	Rodney Charters	David Ehrman	January 14, 2003	2AFF10	10.41
Jack is ultimately rescued from Myers, who is rearrested. He recognizes the attacking group by their tattoos and tells David that they are a covert special ops unit working for NSA, and David deduces that they were sent by Stanton. Sherry reveals Stanton's secret communication network, which can be used as evidence against him. She is revealed to be conspiring with him, and has disclosed the network in order to maintain her cover. With the newfound knowledge of the whereabouts of Syed Ali, Jack leads the team to the house where Kate is being tortured; while Ali leaves and heads to a mosque to say prayers, the henchman kills himself using a cyanide capsule in his mouth. Knowing some Arabic, Kate reports Ali's intention for prayers, and Jack orders a list of nearby mosques. Meanwhile, Reza and the agent find out that the account was hacked, and Marie arrives and kills them both, implied to be the hacker and revealed to be affiliated with Second Wave. While being transferred, Kim and Miguel force a crash, where Miguel gets stuck and is unable to escape; Kim calls for medical response and escapes when they arrive.
35	11	"Day 2: 6:00 p.m. – 7:00 p.m."	Frederick King Keller	Gil Grant	February 4, 2003	2AFF11	12.62
The CTU team tracks Ali to a mosque, where Kate is instructed to dress as a Muslim woman, enter the mosque and identify Ali, which she does. Almeida, who is currently getting emotionally close with Dessler, informs Bob about Marie, who accesses an accomplice's workplace locker by seducing his foreman. CTU team waits for Ali to exit the mosque and be followed, but everyone gets out without signs of Ali. They storm in the mosque and find a man burning with Ali's clothes on, but Jack finds out that it is a deception and Ali is still alive and hiding, and orders the agents to continue protecting the exits. Meanwhile, David has Stanton arrested and tries to convince him to talk, to no avail, and orders a professional agent to start torturing Stanton for information, while Sherry fails to persuade David to give her a post in his staff. Kim keeps running in the woods until she gets stuck in an animal trap and notices a cougar approaching.
36	12	"Day 2: 7:00 p.m. – 8:00 p.m."	Frederick King Keller	Evan Katz	February 11, 2003	2AFF12	12.33
After Jack informs the mosque cleric of the situation, CTU manages to find Ali and Jack stops him from taking the cyanide capsule. Jack finds torture useless and the cleric tries to convince him to talk, but to no avail. CTU recovers burnt papers from Ali's clothes and hires a forensics agent to recover the writing on it. Jack instructs Kate to call Marie and keep her on the line so that she can be traced, but Marie already knows the plan and throws the phone away. Bob tells Mason that Marie studied in London when her mother died. Due to the grief, she left home for several weeks, which Bob believes must have been the time period she was introduced to the terrorists. The writing is recovered and Jack forces Ali to talk by apparently killing one of his sons and threatening to kill the other, and Ali reveals the airport where the plane carrying the bomb will take off. Marie joins other Second Wave operatives at the airport and they manage to prepare the bomb. It is revealed that Ali's son wasn't shot and is still alive. Kresge finds out Sherry's involvement with Stanton, while Kim is saved by Lonnie McRae, a hunter.
37	13	"Day 2: 8:00 p.m. – 9:00 p.m."	Jon Cassar	Maurice Hurley	February 18, 2003	2AFF13	13.14
While the CTU team arrives at the airport, Stanton finally decides to talk and reveals a special ops team to be at the airport ordered to kill Second Wave operatives and recover the bomb, an action that will trigger a more strict military policy by the U.S. government. David orders Secret Service to grant Sherry access to the inside facility as she has connections with a Senator revealed to be Stanton's accomplice. CTU finds six commandos with the tattoo dead at the place, but Stanton reveals that there were seven. CTU finds the plane and stops it, capturing the pilot and recovering a device, which the experts find to be a decoy and not the bomb. David asks Stanton for more information, and he reveals Sherry's involvement. Meanwhile, Kim takes refuge in McRae's secluded house, where he is informed by a policeman of her charges, but she convinces him of her innocence. She tells him about the bomb and he shows her a bunker he has made for nuclear catastrophes. He listens to the radio and states that the bomb has just detonated, and they rush to the bunker.
38	14	"Day 2: 9:00 p.m. – 10:00 p.m."	Jon Cassar	Joel Surnow & Michael Loceff	February 25, 2003	2AFF14	12.64
David confronts Sherry, who manages to prove to him that she was leading a secret investigation with a CIA agent against Stanton and offered cooperation with Stanton as cover. David decides to expel her from the facility instead of having her arrested, while CTU starts interrogating the pilot. Kate tracks Marie, who tries to kill her, but CTU manages to capture her. Jack starts torturing her, and Kate tries to persuade her to talk; she finally gives a location, but Jack deduces that it is another decoy and orders a full search of the perimeter, ultimately managing to find the bomb, which experts say could blow any time. With his condition worsening, Mason leaves CTU and appoints Almeida as the Director. Carrie Turner, an agent from Division sent for assistance, is revealed to have a personal problem with Dessler. Kim finds out that there has been no explosion and pulls a knife on McRae, who states that he only wanted company. She insists on leaving and he decides to let her go after giving her a gun to be able to defend herself.
39	15	"Day 2: 10:00 p.m. – 11:00 p.m."	Ian Toynton	Robert Cochran	March 4, 2003	2AFF15	13.15
CTU discovers that defusing the bomb is impossible and it must be delivered to the Mojave Desert for a safe detonation while the pilot can't leave the plane in order to make the hit accurate, making it a suicide mission. Mason arrives and offers to be the pilot, but Jack refuses and chooses to do it himself. Kim is disturbed by a driver, but she uses her gun to force him to leave. As a woman picks her up, she calls Jack and finds out about his mission, as she leaves the car and continues on foot. Meanwhile, CTU recovers a recording from Ali's house seemingly proving the support of three Middle Eastern governments of the terrorist attack. Yusuf Auda, an agent working for one of those governments, is at CTU for updates, but Almeida doesn't tell him anything. The Joint Chiefs prepare the Armed Forces for Palmer's decision to retaliate, but he decides to hold for now. Jack flies the plane to the location, but on the way, he finds out that Mason has boarded, and he convinces Jack to let him do it and save his own life. Jack jumps out with a parachute, lands, and watches the ensuing explosion along with Palmer and Kim, who believes Jack has died.
40	16	"Day 2: 11:00 p.m. – 12:00 a.m."	Ian Toynton	Howard Gordon & Evan Katz	March 25, 2003	2AFF16	12.09
Jack is returned to CTU, where Dessler asks Ali about the recording, which he denies any involvement with. Almeida doesn't believe his claim and tells Palmer that the recording is authentic, while Dessler tells Jack about Ali's claim. While Ali is being transferred to Guantanamo, Jack tells him that his son is alive and asks him about his claim, which Ali confirms before he is killed by an unknown sniper. Jack feels certain that the recording is fake, but Almeida still doesn't believe it, while the authorities push Palmer to order the assault based on the recording which they believe to be authentic. Palmer gets a call from Jack, and Palmer says Jack has a few hours to prove his claim that it is a fake before the assault starts. Jack gets a call from an unknown man with the tattoo who claims to have evidence that disproves the recording, and the man will yield it if Kate is delivered to him. As Dessler helps Jack abduct Kate, Turner witnesses this and informs Almeida, who intercepts Jack, but Almeida breaks his ankle and the duo escapes. Meanwhile, Kim is allowed into a closed store to use the bathroom, where a man breaks into the store. The police arrive and surround the store, and the intruder critically shoots the store clerk in an ensuing struggle.
41	17	"Day 2: 12:00 a.m. – 1:00 a.m."	Jon Cassar	Evan Katz & Gil Grant	April 1, 2003	2AFF17	12.48
While Jack and Kate head to the location requested by the tattooed man, they notice Auda following them, and Jack includes him in the plan as they arrive at the location, where Jack goes in alone. The man introduces himself as Jonathan Wallace, the seventh member who killed the other six at the airport, and explains that the people he worked for control petroleum in the Caspian Sea, and wanted to trigger a U.S. assault on the Middle East in order to make a huge revenue. He claims to have the source recordings that were assembled to make the fake one, but as his employers killed his transport team, he needs Kate's contacts to leave the country. As Wallace puts her in the trunk, they are attacked by a third party. Meanwhile, Vice President Jim Prescott gets angry for Palmer's decision to hold the invasion. Almeida questions Dessler, who denies helping Jack, and he instructs Turner to watch her, while Dessler gets a call from her brother, Danny, who seems to hate Turner. Kim manages to escape from the store, and the police storm in, critically shooting the intruder and capturing him.
42	18	"Day 2: 1:00 a.m. – 2:00 a.m."	Jon Cassar	Joel Surnow & Michael Loceff	April 8, 2003	2AFF18	11.75
Auda holds the third party attackers while the others go into the building, where Jack calls Michelle and asks for satellite images showing the place of the mercenaries. The four manage to kill some of the attackers and escape in the car, but Wallace is critically shot. Almeida finds out about Dessler's deed and she gets him on the phone with Jack, who explains that Wallace doesn't want CTU involved. They get to a hospital where Wallace succumbs to his wound, and Jack recovers a chip planted under Wallace's skin. Meanwhile, riots start in various cities across the U.S. with hostility towards Middle Easterners, and Palmer orders the National Guard and the Army to protect the foreigners and settle the riots. Kim explains her adventures to the police, who tell her the original charges against her are being dropped, as they have confirmed that Gary Matheson killed his wife, though she still has to deal with the charges of escaping police custody. She calls Almeida, who reveals to her that Jack is alive and promises to free her. She then talks to Miguel on the phone, who says that he doesn't want to see her again and hangs up, before he is revealed to have lost his right leg in the crash.
43	19	"Day 2: 2:00 a.m. – 3:00 a.m."	James Whitmore, Jr.	Howard Gordon	April 15, 2003	2AFF19	11.77
Auda finds a transponder on the chip; Jack takes the transponder and escapes with it while Auda and Kate escape with the chip. Jack is captured by the mercenaries and they start torturing him for the chip, but Jack almost dies as a result of the pressure, and they try to revive him. In the meantime, Auda and Kate are attacked by three street criminals, who start beating up Auda because of his ethnicity. At CTU, Dessler explains to Almeida that Turner got involved with Danny, who was married and had children, and she ended the affair while he lost his family and his job for it and attempted suicide. Danny arrives at CTU to talk to Dessler before he sees Turner and assaults her. Kresge notices that Prescott is assembling the Cabinet members and asks Novick about it, and he reveals that Prescott is trying to invoke the Section 4 of the Twenty-fifth Amendment to the United States Constitution, which gives the Cabinet the authority to depose the President and replace him with the Vice President. Kresge tries to inform Palmer, but Novick locks her in a room and orders an agent to watch her.
44	20	"Day 2: 3:00 a.m. – 4:00 a.m."	James Whitmore, Jr.	Neil Cohen	April 22, 2003	2AFF20	11.94
As the mercenaries force a doctor to revive Jack, Peter Kingsley, one of the masterminds, orders the second-in-command to kill the boss man and continue the torture, which he does. After convincing the doctor to help him escape, Jack kills the mercenaries and gets Kingsley's name. Meanwhile, the thugs take Auda's belongings and decide to leave, and Kate demands the chip and offers money in her house in exchange for it. Jack arrives, and after a dying Auda reveals Kate's whereabouts, he arrives at Kate's and kills one of the thugs, while the other two hide in a room with the chip. Ryan Chappelle arrives at CTU and designates the preparation of domestic response to the invasion as the sole task. Turner finds out that Almeida and Dessler, who have become romantically involved, are still following Jack's lead and tells Chappelle, who decides to keep Almeida because of the lack of human resources. Kresge escapes the room, but falls from the stairs and is critically injured, unable to talk to Palmer. Prescott assembles the Cabinet and they discuss Palmer's capability to run the Office in his absence.
45	21	"Day 2: 4:00 a.m. – 5:00 a.m."	Ian Toynton	Robert Cochran & Howard Gordon	April 29, 2003	2AFF21	12.05
Jack captures the thug and recovers the chip; he finds it damaged and tells Almeida to check Kingsley's name. Kate blames herself for not watching after Marie better, but Jack tells her that it was out of her hands, before he talks to Kim, who is released and being transferred. Almeida and Dessler find a hacker named Alex Hewitt, possibly involved in fabricating the Cyprus recording. Jack heads to Hewitt's location, where he hides when Sherry arrives to find Hewitt for her own plan. Meanwhile, after Novick tells David about the meeting, they join it, where Prescott questions David's ability, then brings Wieland for testimony, but Stanton joins them on a video chat, revealing that he was innocent and tortured for nothing. David asks them to play the rest of the interrogation tape, but Prescott states that there is no more. Finally, Prescott asks for the evidence David claims to disprove the recording, and David states that it hasn't been obtained yet. The voting begins, ending with David deposed with eight votes against seven, and Prescott detains David and swears in as the President, before ordering the troops to move towards the three accused countries.
46	22	"Day 2: 5:00 a.m. – 6:00 a.m."	Ian Toynton	Virgil Williams & Duppy Demetrius	May 6, 2003	2AFF22	13.49
Jack locks up Sherry and her bodyguard and finds out her involvement, and they capture Hewitt, who will testify in exchange for immunity. David convinces agent Aaron Pierce, appointed to watch him, to get him a cell phone so that he can talk to Jack for updates. CTU is informed of David's deposition, and Almeida informs Jack about it before telling Chappelle about Hewitt and asking for a helicopter to pick up Jack, which he denies and tells Almeida that he has been reassigned, essentially firing Almeida, but Dessler lures Chappelle to a room, where Almeida knocks him unconscious and sends the helicopter. Novick finds out about the phone and takes it from David, having Pierce arrested and another agent assigned to watch David. Kim arrives at Matheson's to collect her belongings, not knowing that Gary is there. He kills the police officer who escorted Kim there and attacks Kim, who hides in the ceiling. Kim overpowers Gary and takes his gun, calling Jack for help, and he tells her to kill Gary in self-defense, which she does. As he calls Kate and asks her to go and pick up Kim, Hewitt stabs Sherry and escapes, and Jack gives chase.
47	23	"Day 2: 6:00 a.m. – 7:00 a.m."	Jon Cassar	Gil Grant & Evan Katz	May 13, 2003	2AFF23	12.72
Hewitt gets critically wounded, needing the helicopter fast. Division agents arrive and find Chappelle, who returns the helicopter and has Almeida arrested while Dessler is working in a van outside. Hewitt succumbs to his wounds and Jack returns to Sherry and asks her for another way, and she explains that they need to use Kingsley's confession, while Dessler helps Jack produce Hewitt's phonetic template before she is found and arrested. Sherry calls Kingsley and plays Hewitt's forged voice, proving his presence, and she arranges a deal to deliver him in exchange for taking the evidence Kingsley has against her. While driving to the location, Jack has a heart attack as a result of the immense torture he experienced previously, resulting in a crash. Novick informs David that a nearby country needs the latter's authorization to allow the U.S. military planes to pass, as David's deposition hasn't been made public yet. David agrees to talk to that country's head of state, and enlists the help of an operative from the Justice Department for his claim, while Kate arrives and recovers Kim.
48	24	"Day 2: 7:00 a.m. – 8:00 a.m."	Jon Cassar	Teleplay by : Joel Surnow & Michael Loceff; Story by : Robert Cochran & Howard Gordon	May 20, 2003	2AFF24	14.20
Jack and Sherry hijack a car and continue after Jack ultimately convinces a reluctant Sherry to go through with the meeting with Kingsley in order to help Palmer. The DOJ operative tells Novick about his findings, and the latter orders Chappelle to help Jack prove his claim. Sherry has a microphone put on her and enters the Los Angeles Coliseum, where she manages to deceive Kingsley to confess the recording's forgery and his involvement in it. Jack kills the snipers and attacks Kingsley's men while Sherry escapes. In the ensuing shootout, Jack manages to kill the mercenaries before he has another heart attack, and Kingsley attempts to kill him before being fatally shot by CTU agents. In the aftermath, Prescott decides to abort the attack as a result of the new evidence, before revoking his succession and offering David his resignation, which the latter refuses. David also tells Mike Novick that he expected his complete support and thus fires him. Kingsley's co-conspirator, Max, tells another co-conspirator, Trepkos, that he has another plan to trigger the war. Kate and Kim arrive and reunite with Jack, while Almeida and Dessler are released and the former stands up to Chappelle, who leaves the CTU building with Turner. Later, Palmer gives a speech outside before he collapses as a result of being poisoned by Mandy.

== Production ==
Season 2 marked the first of three uses of the show's Air Force One set. Xander Berkeley's character spent much of the season dying of radiation poisoning and various actors commented that they thought the story played out very well. Kiefer Sutherland became a producer for the second season. In an interview, he joked that "Fox originally did not want to give me a raise so they gave me a title." In the same interview, Sutherland mentions that he tried suggesting a storyline detail which got rejected by the writers. One idea that did get accepted by the writers was Carlos Bernard's idea to mention London's "Finsbury Park Mosque" during an interrogation scene. Shortly after the season aired, authorities raided this mosque, having discovered that radical groups were indeed meeting there.

=== Trailer ===
The original trailer titled "Get Ready" aired in early September 2002, slightly more than a month before the season premiere. It is only 15 seconds long and features a number of shots from season 2 in quick succession. It ends with Jack telling his daughter that she has to leave Los Angeles.

== Reception ==
The second season received critical acclaim, scoring a Metacritic rating of 83/100 based on 23 reviews. On Rotten Tomatoes, the season has an approval rating of 95% with an average score of 7.5 out of 10 based on 19 reviews. The website's critical consensus reads, "24's sophomore outing is not as elegantly structured as its predecessor, but the series firmly puts to rest any fears that its propulsive thrills were a one-time novelty."

For this season, Kiefer Sutherland won the Screen Actors Guild Award for Outstanding Performance by a Male Actor in a Drama Series and the Satellite Award for Best Actor – Television Series Drama (for the second time in a row). Sean Callery, the show's composer won the Primetime Emmy Award for Outstanding Music Composition for a Series. The alleged absurdity of Kim Bauer's run-in with the cougar has created an enduring reference in the television review community.

=== Award nominations ===
Organization	Category	Nominee(s)	Result
Primetime Emmy Awards	Outstanding Drama Series	Jon Cassar, Robert Cochran, Howard Gordon, Brian Grazer, Michael Loceff, Tony Krantz, Norman Powell, Joel Surnow, Kiefer Sutherland	Nominated
Primetime Emmy Awards	Outstanding Lead Actor in a Drama Series	Kiefer Sutherland	Nominated
Primetime Emmy Awards	Outstanding Directing for a Drama Series	Ian Toynton	Nominated
Primetime Emmy Awards	Outstanding Music Composition for a Series, Dramatic Underscore	Sean Callery	Won
Primetime Emmy Awards	Outstanding Single-Camera Picture Editing for a Series	Chris Willingham	Won
Primetime Emmy Awards	Outstanding Single-Camera Picture Editing for a Series	Chris Willingham, David Latham	Nominated
Primetime Emmy Awards	Outstanding Casting for a Drama Series	Debi Manwiller, Peggy Kennedy, Richard Pagano	Nominated
Primetime Emmy Awards	Outstanding Single-Camera Sound Mixing for a Series	William Gocke, Mike Olman, Ken Kobett	Nominated
Primetime Emmy Awards	Outstanding Stunt Coordination	Eddy Donno	Nominated
Golden Globe Awards	Best Drama Series		Nominated
Golden Globe Awards	Best Actor in a Drama Series	Kiefer Sutherland	Nominated
Golden Globe Awards	Best Supporting Actor	Dennis Haysbert	Nominated
Screen Actors Guild Awards	Outstanding Performance by a Male Actor in a Drama Series	Kiefer Sutherland	Won
Satellite Awards	Best Drama Series		Nominated
Satellite Awards	Best Actor in a Drama Series	Kiefer Sutherland	Won
Satellite Awards	Best Supporting Actress in a Drama Series	Sarah Clarke	Won
Satellite Awards	Best Supporting Actor in a Drama Series	Dennis Haysbert	Nominated
Writers Guild of America Awards	Episodic Drama	Evan Katz	Won
Producers Guild of America Awards	Television Producer of the Year Award in Episodic - Drama	Brian Grazer, Tony Krantz, Howard Gordon, Robert Cochran, Joel Surnow, Cyrus Yavneh	Won
Television Critics Association Awards	Outstanding Achievement in Drama		Nominated
Television Critics Association Awards	Individual Achievement in Drama	Kiefer Sutherland	Nominated

== Home media releases ==
The second season was released on DVD in region 1 on September 9, 2003 and in region 2 on August 11, 2003.
