= 24 season 1 =

Season of television series

24
- Season 1
- Promotional poster
- Starring: Kiefer Sutherland; Leslie Hope; Sarah Clarke; Elisha Cuthbert; Dennis Haysbert
- No. of episodes: 24

Release
- Original network: Fox
- Original release: November 6, 2001 – May 21, 2002

Season chronology
- Next → Season 2

The first season of the American drama television series 24, also known as Day 1, was first broadcast from November 6, 2001, to May 21, 2002, on Fox. The season's storyline starts at midnight and ends at the following midnight on the day of the California presidential primary.

== Season overview ==
The season's main plot revolves around an assassination attempt on David Palmer, a U.S. Senator from Maryland who is a presidential candidate for the Democratic Party, on the day of the primary election in California. The central character is Jack Bauer, a former United States Army Delta Force operator, who is the Director of the fictional Counter Terrorist Unit (CTU) in Los Angeles. Bauer becomes professionally as well as personally involved when his wife Teri and daughter Kim are kidnapped by the people behind the assassination.

The season is divided into two halves, each with a distinct villain. The first focuses on a mercenary group, led by Ira Gaines, in their efforts to control Bauer by kidnapping his wife and daughter, blackmailing him to kill Senator Palmer. The second half focuses on the Drazen brothers, who hired Gaines and his men, as they execute a contingency plan. As CTU tracks their activities, Bauer learns why he and the Senator are being targeted.

Fox initially ordered only 13 episodes; the successful rescue at the end of the season's first half was planned as a series finale in the event that the show was not renewed.

=== Major subplots ===
The show follows each of the five main characters—Jack Bauer, Teri Bauer, Kim Bauer, Nina Myers, and David Palmer—simultaneously, as well as one main villain: Ira Gaines, Andre Drazen, and finally Victor Drazen. The day's situations and the relationships between these five characters and their associates form the basis for the season's subplots, which include:

- A mole at CTU is sabotaging efforts to stop Palmer's assassination.
- Members of the Bauer family are rebuilding their relationships now that Bauer has moved home after being separated from Teri for six months.
- There are tensions between Bauer and two of his co-workers: Nina Myers and Tony Almeida. Myers is in a relationship with Almeida but was previously involved with Bauer.
- Teri discovers the relationship between Bauer and Myers.
- Kim develops feelings for Rick Allen, even though he was originally hired to kidnap her.
- Political scandals threaten to erupt as Maureen Kingsley, a reporter and friend of Palmer's, learns that Palmer's daughter had been raped seven years prior, and that Palmer's son killed the rapist, Lyle Gibson.
- Sherry Palmer's lies, including helping to cover up Keith's role in Gibson's death, cause Palmer to question Sherry's loyalties and motives.

=== Summary ===
Season 1 starts and ends at 12:00 a.m. PST on the day of the California Presidential Primary. The season focuses on presidential candidate David Palmer, and the repeated attempts on his life prevented by Counter Terrorist Unit agent Jack Bauer, who becomes personally involved when the assassins kidnap his wife Teri and daughter Kim in an attempt to blackmail Bauer.

The first 13 episodes focus on the efforts of a terrorist cell led by Ira Gaines to assassinate Palmer. Bauer becomes an instrument for Gaines after Gaines kidnaps his wife Teri and daughter Kim in order to force him to aid in the assassination and take the fall for Palmer's death. Forced to go rogue from the agency, Bauer gets assistance from Nina Myers and eventually Tony Almeida as they attempt to identify a mole in CTU helping Gaines.

Throughout the day, Palmer also deals with his ethical responsibilities as it is revealed that his son is implicated in the death of his daughter's rapist. He clashes repeatedly with his wife, his son, and his fixer trying to figure out the best way to handle the coming story. Upon discovering his wife Sherry's role in the cover-up, he begins to doubt her motivations. After the first assassination attempt fails, he remembers Bauer, and eventually the two meet and begin to work together to take down the men who hired Gaines, Andre and Alexis Drazen.

Two years prior, to the day, Bauer was sent as part of a classified team to Kosovo on the orders of a Senate subcommittee headed by Palmer to kill Victor Drazen, Slobodan Milošević's "shadow." In order to ensure secrecy, the panel never met nor knew the team of operatives, nor did the team know the panel. Therefore, Palmer and Bauer never knew about each other before the events of the show. The mission went south, resulting in the death of Victor Drazen, as well as his wife and daughter. The Drazens decided to get revenge on Palmer and Bauer by killing Palmer, framing Bauer, and killing Bauer's own wife and daughter.

During the last few hours of the day, Bauer discovered his team had only killed Drazen's body double; the real Victor Drazen is actually a top secret, unofficial prisoner of the U.S. government, and the Drazens' primary goal was to free him.

Eventually, to satisfy the Drazens, Palmer's death is faked, but Sherry exposes the ruse on TV, causing Palmer to divorce her. Out of options, Victor Drazen calls his mole inside CTU, revealed to be Nina Myers, ordering her to call Bauer and tell him that his daughter is dead in an attempt to lure him into a trap and kill him. Bauer ultimately kills Drazen and all his men in retaliation, but learns that Myers lied to him and must be a mole. Before he can take her into custody, she shoots his wife dead, and the season ends with Bauer tearfully apologizing to his dead wife while cradling her in his arms.

== Characters ==
Season 1 main cast: (from left to right) Elisha Cuthbert, Leslie Hope, Kiefer Sutherland, Dennis Haysbert, and Sarah Clarke

=== Starring ===
- Kiefer Sutherland as Jack Bauer (24 episodes)
- Leslie Hope as Teri Bauer (24 episodes)
- Sarah Clarke as Nina Myers (24 episodes)
- Elisha Cuthbert as Kim Bauer (24 episodes)
- Dennis Haysbert as Senator David Palmer (24 episodes)

=== Special guest stars ===
- Carlos Bernard as Tony Almeida (23 episodes)
- Penny Johnson Jerald as Sherry Palmer (22 episodes)
- Richard Burgi as Kevin Carroll (11 episodes)
- Dennis Hopper as Victor Drazen (5 episodes)
- Lou Diamond Phillips as Mark DeSalvo (2 episodes)

=== Guest starring ===
- Daniel Bess as Rick Allen (18 episodes)
- Željko Ivanek as Andre Drazen (15 episodes)
- Xander Berkeley as George Mason (12 episodes)
- Michael Massee as Ira Gaines (12 episodes)
- Vicellous Shannon as Keith Palmer (12 episodes)
- Jude Ciccolella as Mike Novick (11 episodes)
- Karina Arroyave as Jamey Farrell (10 episodes)
- Zach Grenier as Carl Webb (9 episodes)
- Glenn Morshower as Aaron Pierce (9 episodes)
- Tanya Wright as Patty Brooks (8 episodes)
- Eric Balfour as Milo Pressman (8 episodes)
- Misha Collins as Alexis Drazen (7 episodes)
- Matthew Carey as Dan Mounts (6 episodes)
- Megalyn Echikunwoke as Nicole Palmer (6 episodes)
- Jacqui Maxwell as Janet York (6 episodes)
- Silas Weir Mitchell as Eli Stram (6 episodes)
- Navi Rawat as Melanie (6 episodes)
- Tamara Tunie as Alberta Green (6 episodes)
- Rudolf Martin as Jonathon Matijevich/Martin Belkin (4 episodes)
- Vincent Angell as Phil Parslow (4 episodes)
- Henri Lubatti as Jovan Myovic (4 episodes)
- Devika Parikh as Maureen Kingsley (4 episodes)
- Kara Zediker as Elizabeth Nash (4 episodes)
- Edoardo Ballerini as Frank Allard (3 episodes)
- Mia Kirshner as Mandy (3 episodes)
- Paul Schulze as Ryan Chappelle (3 episodes)
- Currie Graham as Ted Cofell (2 episodes)
- John Hawkes as Greg Penticoff (2 episodes)
- Kim Murphy as Bridgit (2 episodes)
- Michael O'Neill as Richard Walsh (2 episodes)
- Wade Andrew Williams as Robert Ellis (2 episodes)
- Pauley Perrette as Tanya (2 episodes)

== Episodes ==
| No. overall | No. in season | Title | Directed by | Written by | Original release date | Prod. code | US viewers (millions) |
|---|---|---|---|---|---|---|---|
| 1 | 1 | "12:00 a.m. – 1:00 a.m." | Stephen Hopkins | Robert Cochran & Joel Surnow | November 6, 2001 | 1AFF79 | 11.64 |
On the day of the California Presidential Primaries, the Counter Terrorist Unit (CTU) of Los Angeles is informed of an assassination attempt on Senator David Palmer, who is running for President. Palmer is contacted by a reporter friend, Maureen Kingsley, but their call ends angrily. CTU agent Jack Bauer is called in to work on the assassination case shortly after his daughter, Kim, sneaks out of the house. CTU director Richard Walsh informs Bauer that a mole has infiltrated CTU, and tasks Bauer with uncovering their identity. Bauer works closely with agent Nina Myers, whom he trusts in part because he had a sexual relationship with her while separated from his wife. Eventually, George Mason, an agent from district command, arrives with intel, but refuses to reveal the source, leading Bauer and Meyers to threaten to disclose Mason's embezzlement in order to get him to talk. Meanwhile, Kim meets up with her friend, Janet York; they meet two boys, Rick Allen and Dan Mounts, at a furniture store. Kim and Rick begin to develop a relationship while Dan drugs Janet. Kim gets suspicious the boys offer her and Janet a ride home, but don't follow her directions. Meanwhile, Bauer's wife Teri joins forces with Janet's father Alan York to find the girls. On a plane, a woman named Mandy steals the ID of a photographer scheduled to photograph Palmer and blows up the plane after jumping out.
| 2 | 2 | "1:00 a.m. – 2:00 a.m." | Stephen Hopkins | Joel Surnow & Michael Loceff | November 13, 2001 | 1AFF01 | 8.77 |
CTU Director Richard Walsh meets an agent with information on the Palmer case. The agent gives Walsh a keycard, before being shot by an unknown assailant. Walsh escapes, but calls Jack Bauer for backup. In the desert, Mandy hides the photographer's ID for her partner Bridgit, as insurance that Ira Gaines, for whom she is working, has payment for the ID. However, Bridgit refuses to deliver it, demanding more money for her and Mandy. Teri and Alan York track Kim and Janet to the furniture store, but are too late. Dan and Rick force Kim to call Teri and state that everything is fine, but Teri realizes from Kim's tone that something's wrong. At Palmer's campaign headquarters, Secret Service agents, led by Aaron Pierce, arrive to enhance the Senator's security. Palmer contacts his fixer Carl Webb with details of Kingsley's story and the two agree to meet. Years prior, Palmer's daughter Nicole was raped by a man named Lyle Gibson, who died on the same day. While the death was initially ruled a suicide, Kingsley has evidence that Palmer's son Keith murdered Gibson and is threatening to reveal it. Meanwhile, Bauer reaches Walsh, and the pair try to escape the gunmen. As they are leaving the building, Walsh is mortally wounded but gives Bauer the keycard, which contains the mole's identity. At CTU, agent Jamey Farrell decrypts the keycard, which implicates Myers as the mole.
| 3 | 3 | "2:00 a.m. – 3:00 a.m." | Stephen Hopkins | Joel Surnow & Michael Loceff | November 20, 2001 | 1AFF02 | 8.18 |
Bauer confronts Myers, who denies being the mole. Farrell continues to investigate the keycard, eventually discovering that it was accessed while Bauer and Myers were spending a weekend together, proving her innocence. Kim and Janet manage to escape from Dan and Rick, but the pair give chase. The girls encounter a homeless man, who initially robs them, but eventually helps them escape. Kim finds a cell phone and calls Teri, revealing the true situation. Before Teri and York can arrive, Janet is hit by a car, causing Dan and Rick to recapture Kim, leaving Janet for dead. Palmer sneaks out of headquarters and meets Webb, who offers to stop Kingsley until the Palmer wins the Primary. Palmer also wants the source dealt with. Webb agrees as the Secret Service arrive to retrieve Palmer. Meanwhile, Bridgit gives the photographer's ID to Gaines and is shot by a sniper, an assassin who has had plastic surgery to resemble the photographer. Mandy is spared after she accepts a job planned for summer. CTU agent Tony Almeida finds out about Walsh's death and reports the situation to district, requesting Bauer's removal.
| 4 | 4 | "3:00 a.m. – 4:00 a.m." | Winrich Kolbe | Robert Cochran | November 27, 2001 | 1AFF03 | 9.15 |
As the team find a clue, Mason arrives from district with his men and issues a lockdown. Bauer manages to escape, causing Mason to interrogate Myers and Farrell to learn his whereabouts. Bauer follows the lead to a warehouse, where he gets into a gunfight with a thug. A policewoman hears the gunshots teams up with Bauer to capture the thug. Eventually, the thug takes the policewoman hostage, and fatally shoots her while Bauer attempts to stop him. Before being taken into custody, the thug reveals to Bauer that Kim is in danger, and that Bauer must free him in exchange for his help. Meanwhile, Dan tries to ensure Janet is dead by running her over with his truck, but an ambulance arrives before he can. Dan and Rick take Kim to Gaines. After being delayed by a policeman, Teri and York arrive where Kim called from, and find out that Janet has been taken to a hospital. Palmer reveals Keith's situation to his wife, Sherry.
| 5 | 5 | "4:00 a.m. – 5:00 a.m." | Winrich Kolbe | Chip Johannessen | December 11, 2001 | 1AFF04 | 7.61 |
At the police station, Bauer tries to get to the thug but is confronted by Mason. Realizing that the thug will only talk to Bauer, Mason allows the two to talk, and Bauer stages an altercation that allows him to slip the thug a note containing his phone number. On the phone, the thug says that he will talk only after the breakout. Bauer manages to steal a guard's keycard and give it to the thug, and they successfully escape. They drive to a payphone, where Gaines has hidden a cellphone; he orders the thug to dispose of a body in a car. Mason and the police track Bauer and the thug, and catch up with them at the car. The thug is arrested while Bauer and Mason recover the mutilated body. Jack then heads to the hospital where Janet, Teri, and York are. Meanwhile, Gaines finds out that Janet is alive and kills Dan as punishment. Palmer arranges a meeting with Kingsley and asks her about her sources. She reveals that the story came from George Ferregamo, Keith's therapist, and is supported by hospital records. Palmer then wakes up Keith and asks him where he was the night Nicole was attacked, but Keith refuses to answer.
| 6 | 6 | "5:00 a.m. – 6:00 a.m." | Bryan Spicer | Howard Gordon | December 18, 2001 | 1AFF05 | 8.17 |
As CTU tries to identify the mutilated body, Myers brings in Milo Pressman, a contractor, to decrypt the keycard that Walsh had given to Bauer. Bauer arrives at the hospital to ask Janet about Kim, but is suspicious of York. York smothers Janet, revealed to be not her father but an assassin working for Gaines. At the same time, Gaines calls Bauer and threatens to kill Kim if he doesn't follow Gaines's instructions. Gaines forces Bauer to wear an earpiece and abandon his phone, while a pair of Gaines's men tail him. York pretends Janet gave him Kim's location, and the two leave the hospital to find her. On the way, Myers calls Teri looking for Bauer, and asks her to pass on the message that the mutilated body was identified as Alan York. Webb tells Palmer that Keith did confront Nicole's rapist Lyle Gibson. Gibson attacked Keith, and Keith killed Gibson in self-defense. Keith then went to Webb, who covered it up for Palmer's career. Palmer angrily fires Webb, who reveals that Sherry had sent Keith to him before he leaves. Palmer confronts Sherry, who admits to the cover-up but claims it was all done to protect Palmer's career. Mike Novick, Palmer's chief of staff, advises him to reveal the story before Kingsley does.
| 7 | 7 | "6:00 a.m. – 7:00 a.m." | Bryan Spicer | Andrea Newman | January 8, 2002 | 1AFF06 | 8.31 |
Palmer debates with his family and staff what to do about Kingsley, with Palmer eventually deciding to reveal the story first at a campaign appearance later that morning, despite the protests of both Sherry and Keith. Meanwhile, following Gaines's instructions, Bauer returns to CTU, where Gaines forces him to replace the keycard Pressman is working on with another one. Gaines learns that York's identity has been compromised, and warns York, who is driving Teri into a secluded section of the hills. Teri attacks York and ties him to a tree, eventually calling CTU for help. Farrell picks up, but Gaines's men arrive and capture Teri, revealing Farrell to be the mole. Meanwhile, Gaines is forcing Kim and Rick to bury Dan's body, and the two begin to plot an escape. Before they can leave, however, Teri arrives at the compound and Kim decides to stay. Meanwhile, Myers discovers that Bauer switched the keycards and confronts him in his office, causing Gaines to order Bauer to kidnap Myers. Bauer brings Myers out to a remote location and shoots her. Suspicious, Almeida looks at the security camera footage of Bauer's office and realizes that Bauer put Myers in a bulletproof flak jacket, and she is revealed to be alive.
| 8 | 8 | "7:00 a.m. – 8:00 a.m." | Stephen Hopkins | Joel Surnow & Michael Loceff | January 15, 2002 | 1AFF07 | 7.51 |
Myers secretly returns to CTU and informs Almeida of the situation. They begin to work together, realizing that if Gaines had access to the cameras, then Farrell must be the mole. They capture her, but she refuses to talk until she gets immunity. Palmer and Sherry arrive at a power plant where he will speak to union leaders. Gaines's assassin also arrives, posing as the photographer, and Gaines orders Bauer to bring in a briefcase with a rifle for the assassin. In the crowd, Bauer tries to warn a friend working on Palmer's campaign, but is prevented by Gaines. His plan is to have the assassin kill Palmer with the rifle Bauer smuggled in, making it look like Bauer was the assassin. As Palmer begins to speak, about to reveal Keith's story, Bauer stops both the speech and the assassination by accosting a Secret Service agent. Gaines orders his men to kill Teri and Kim, but calls off the order after receiving a call from Farrell, who states that the failure wasn't Bauer's fault, as Almeida had called the Secret Service and warned them that Bauer was a potential threat.
| 9 | 9 | "8:00 a.m. – 9:00 a.m." | Stephen Hopkins | Virgil Williams | January 22, 2002 | 1AFF08 | 9.10 |
Bauer fails to convince the Secret Service of his innocence, causing him to escape custody while being transferred. He takes a woman hostage in the office of a construction site, explaining his situation and that he does not intend to hurt her. Bauer calls Myers and asks for a car and other tools. Myers tells him that Farrell was the mole, and Bauer orders her to threaten her son so she will talk. Bauer and his hostage begin to bond, but it is unclear how much she trusts him. Eventually, Bauer instructs her to retrieve the car, but she instead informs the police of Bauer's whereabouts. Bauer narrowly escapes in the car. At Gaines's compound, a guard tries to rape Kim, but Teri convinces him to rape her instead, stealing his cell phone in the process. After the assassination attempt, Palmer is safely returned to headquarters. Informed the assassin was Bauer, the name rings a bell. Sherry uses the attempt to persuade Kingsley to hold her the story about Keith. At CTU, Myers and Almeida find that Farrell has attempted suicide.
| 10 | 10 | "9:00 a.m. – 10:00 a.m." | Davis Guggenheim | Lawrence Hertzog | February 5, 2002 | 1AFF09 | 9.25 |
Farrell is taken to the hospital for her injuries. Using the stolen cellphone, Teri and Kim call Myers at CTU, but are interrupted by the guard looking for his phone. Meanwhile, agent Alberta Green arrives from district and assumes command of CTU as Bauer is seen as a rogue threat. The team begin connecting the dots between Palmer, Bauer, Gaines, and the exploded plane, identifying a man named Ted Cofell as a potential accomplice. Green suspects Myers and Almeida are helping Bauer. Myers has been keeping Bauer informed, telling him about Farrell's death and the lead on Cofell. Bauer calls Cofell's office and is informed that he is leaving for Denver; he arrives in time to catch Cofell, posing as his driver. Meanwhile, Andre Drazen, who planned the attack on Palmer and Bauer, contacts Gaines and arranges a meeting. During a campaign event at an elementary school, Palmer receives a call from an important sponsor, who reveals that other large donors have told Webb to get rid of Keith's problem completely, which frightens Palmer.
| 11 | 11 | "10:00 a.m. – 11:00 a.m." | Davis Guggenheim | Robert Cochran | February 12, 2002 | 1AFF10 | 7.60 |
Bauer kidnaps Cofell and interrogates him, but he denies knowing anything about the assassination plot. He mentions that he is to a meet with a man named Kevin Carroll, and Bauer has Myers investigate Carroll. During the interrogation, Bauer takes Cofell's heart medication. At the compound, Drazen tells Gaines that since he failed to kill Palmer, Drazen will activate a contingency plan, ordering that Teri and Kim be killed. However, they manage to overpower the guard sent to kill them, and shoot him twice to stage their own deaths. Palmer calls Webb, who threatens Palmer, telling him to obey his sponsors, the men they both work for. Palmer, refusing to be bought, calls Ferrgamo, Keith's therapist and Kingsley's source. Meanwhile, Bauer brings Cofell to the meeting with Carroll. Cofell attacks Bauer, revealing himself to be Serbian, and telling Bauer that the assassination plot is personal before dying of a heart attack. Carroll arrives - revealed to be the man impersonating Alan York - and Bauer captures him, promising to free Carroll if he takes Bauer to his family.
| 12 | 12 | "11:00 a.m. – 12:00 p.m." | Stephen Hopkins | Howard Gordon | February 19, 2002 | 1AFF11 | 7.98 |
Bauer enters the compound with Carroll's help. He knocks Carroll unconscious during a struggle and binds him, then proceeds to where Teri and Kim are being held. They reunite but are interrupted by Rick, who has been trying all morning to help Teri and Kim. The four of them team up, and Rick leaves to steal a van for their escape. A patrol finds and frees Carroll, who reveals Bauer's presence, and Gaines makes Rick drive the van he was stealing to Carroll. As Carroll warns Gaines about Bauer, Rick drives away to save the Bauers. Meanwhile, Bauer calls Green at CTU, who has been interrogating Myers and Almeida about their connection with Bauer, revealing his family's situation and requests backup. Rick arrives and the Bauers get in, but are stopped by mercenaries and forced to continue on foot. In the ensuing shootout, Bauer makes Teri and Kim go to the extraction point, while he and Rick cover. They eventually escape, but Rick is shot in the process. Meanwhile, Palmer calls Ferregamo and warns him of the attempt on his life, which Ferregamo interprets as a threat and hangs up. Palmer decides to meet Ferregamo personally, but when he arrives, he finds the office on fire and Ferregamo dead. Palmer realizes Webb murdered Ferregamo.
| 13 | 13 | "12:00 p.m. – 1:00 p.m." | Stephen Hopkins | Andrea Newman | February 26, 2002 | 1AFF12 | 8.93 |
Bauer and Rick continue through the woods, but Bauer is skeptical of Rick's heroism, reminding him that he kidnapped Kim regardless of his actions on the compound. They find the extraction point empty; Kim and Teri have gotten lost. Bauer leaves Rick to find them. Having lost control of the situation, Gaines tries to convince Drazen to let him kill Bauer to prove his loyalty. A mercenary finds Kim and Teri in an abandoned house, but Bauer arrives and saves them. As he leads them to the extraction point, Gaines begins shooting at them, and Bauer confronts him. He tries to convince Gaines to surrender, but is forced to kill Gaines when he pulls his gun. Kim and Teri are rescued by CTU agents, while Rick escapes on a bus, fearing prosecution. Meanwhile, Kingsley decides to drop the case after hearing about Ferregamo and being threatened herself. Palmer fails to dissuade her, so he visits Webb, who states that Keith will be framed for arson if Palmer doesn't comply. As a result, Palmer decides not to reveal the case to the district attorney, intending to cover it up.
| 14 | 14 | "1:00 p.m. – 2:00 p.m." | Jon Cassar | Joel Surnow & Michael Loceff | March 5, 2002 | 1AFF13 | 8.18 |
Back at CTU, Bauer is interrogated by division command director Ryan Chappelle, while Teri and Kim are taken to a hospital for examination with Myers. Green and Chappelle try to convince Almeida to testify against Bauer, but he refuses. At the hospital, Myers becomes suspicious of a strange man claiming to be an FBI agent. After finding out about the rape, the doctor decides to run a pregnancy test for Teri, but Myers decides to move Teri and Kim to a safe house immediately upon discovering that the strange man was not an FBI agent. He is later revealed to be Jovan Myovic, one of Drazen's henchmen. Carroll calls Drazen and tries to make a new deal, but he and Gaines's remaining men are killed by a glasses-wearing assassin. At campaign headquarters, Keith is angered by Palmer's decision to bury the true story of Ferragamo's death, as Ferregamo meant a lot to Keith. Palmer's Chief of Staff Novick discovers his connection with Bauer: two years prior, Bauer had led a covert mission authorized by Palmer's Senate committee targeting the Drazen family. Bauer was the only survivor, leading Palmer to believe that Bauer blames him for the deaths of his teammates and is now seeking revenge. To maintain secrecy, the two have never met nor knew the other's role. Palmer decides to go to CTU to meet Bauer in person. One of Palmer's staff members, Elizabeth Nash, sneaks out to have sex with the assassin who killed Carroll, unaware of his true identity. The team at CTU find three potential assassins through connections with Gaines as Palmer arrives and demands to see Bauer.
| 15 | 15 | "2:00 p.m. – 3:00 p.m." | Jon Cassar | Michael S. Chernuchin | March 12, 2002 | 1AFF14 | 8.86 |
At CTU headquarters, Palmer strong arms his way into a meeting with Bauer. Initially hostile, Bauer is able to convince Palmer of his innocence, and the two begin to work together. They realize that the Drazens must have discovered their role in their family's deaths, seeking revenge by killing Palmer and framing Bauer. They call Robert Ellis, the NSA agent who coordinated the mission, and start investigating who could have revealed their identities to the Drazens. Palmer convinces Chappelle to temporarily reinstate Bauer to continue the mission. At the safe house, Teri takes the pregnancy test, which comes back positive. Kim finds out shortly, and they plan to tell Bauer but are interrupted by Myers, who needs to debrief them. Kim tries to minimize Rick's guilt, but Teri is much more open about his role. During their debriefing, Teri realizes that Myers and Bauer were involved during their separation, though Myers tells Teri that it is over now. While on the phone with Bauer, Ellis is killed by an assassin before he can reveal key information.
| 16 | 16 | "3:00 p.m. – 4:00 p.m." | Stephen Hopkins | Robert Cochran & Howard Gordon | March 19, 2002 | 1AFF15 | 9.20 |
The Secret Service inform Palmer's staff about the three suspects, including Alexis Drazen, whom Nash recognizes as her lover. She is brought to CTU to debrief with Bauer. Mason is sent to CTU to assist Bauer, and the pair decide to forget the past for the sake of the mission. Bauer convinces Nash to work with CTU to capture Alexis. At the safe house, Teri and Myers become increasingly hostile as the debrief continues and Teri cannot contain her anger. Myers leaves the safe house to accompany Bauer in capturing Alexis. While another agent continues to debrief Teri, the safe house is attacked by Myovic, but Teri and Kim escape in a car, with one Myovic following. Teri evades him by taking a dirt path, parking on the crumbling edge of the road. While Teri attempts to see if they're still being followed, the car slides down into a valley and explodes, apparently killing Kim. Teri has a mental breakdown and collapses. Meanwhile, after Palmer promises Keith to watch after him from now on, Keith arranges a meeting with Webb, sneaking out with Nicole's help. He secretly records the meeting, during which Webb threatens to frame him for Ferragamo's death if he does not cooperate. Teri wakes up with amnesia, and is picked up by a concerned woman. It is revealed that Kim survived the car crash, and she continues on foot.
| 17 | 17 | "4:00 p.m. – 5:00 p.m." | Stephen Hopkins | Michael S. Chernuchin | March 26, 2002 | 1AFF16 | 9.33 |
The CTU team, including Bauer and Myers, arrive at Palmer's campaign headquarters. Bauer instructs Nash to put a tracker in Alexis's wallet when they next meet. They bug Alexis's room so they can monitor the situation. Alexis arrives, questioning Nash repeatedly about Palmer's movements for the day. On the road, Teri recognizes a restaurant, and decides to wait there for help. The waiter recognizes her and calls Dr. Phil Parslow, who Teri saw frequently during her separation from Bauer. Parslow arrives and promises to help Teri recover her memories. On her own, Kim calls CTU, but is suspicious when Almeida picks up and can't connect her to either Bauer or Myers. She informs him about the attack on the safe house, but hangs up before he can get her location. She then calls Rick, and takes a cab to his house as she doesn't know who else to trust. At campaign headquarters, Keith plays the recording of Webb to Palmer and gives him the tape. Downstairs, Nash manages to plant the tracker, but stabs Alexis when he claims he loves her. CTU agents storm the room to arrest both Nash and Alexis. Alexis's cell phone rings and Bauer answers for him, arranging a meeting with the caller.
| 18 | 18 | "5:00 p.m. – 6:00 p.m." | Frederick King Keller | Maurice Hurley | April 2, 2002 | 1AFF17 | 8.72 |
Bauer goes to the meeting with $50,000 in bearer bonds with a CTU sniper, Teddy Hanlin, as backup. Hanlin resents Bauer for exposing his old partner's corruption, taunting Bauer about the situation. Parslow offers to take Teri home, but Myovic is waiting for them there. At Rick's house, his girlfriend Melanie grows suspicious of Kim's relationship with Rick and the events of the past night. Rick claims that he and Dan were separated and that he doesn't know where Dan is. Dan's brother Frank arrives at the house, looking for Dan and the payout he and Rick were supposed to receive from Gaines. Finding both missing and suspicious of Kim, Frank prevents anyone from leaving the house. At campaign headquarters, Palmer plays Keith's tape to Sherry and Novick. Palmer wants to release the tape immediately, but Novick suggests he use it as leverage while Sherry suggests they destroy it. Palmer has the tape locked in his safe before leaving the suite, during which time Sherry breaks in and destroys the tape. Upon discovering this betrayal, Palmer reveals that Sherry destroyed a decoy tape, and has just exposed her true personality to him. He immediately orders a press conference. Bauer meets Alexis's contact, who reveals that he will cut the power supply at a specific location before he realizes that Jack is not Alexis. Jack orders the snipers not to shoot, but Hanlin disobeys and kills the contact as he tries to run away.
| 19 | 19 | "6:00 p.m. – 7:00 p.m." | Frederick King Keller | Joel Surnow & Michael Loceff | April 9, 2002 | 1AFF18 | 8.84 |
Myers tries to warn Jack of his family's situation, but Mason stops her to help Jack focus. Meanwhile, Teri and Parslow arrive at the house, and as his friend comes to aid them, the mercenary attacks, kills Parslow's friend, and wounds Parslow, but as he forces Teri to reveal Kim's location, Almeida arrives and kills him. Allard finds out about Mounts and arranges a drug deal in his house, before pulling his gun on the sellers with the intention to kill them and take the merchandise. The lead seller is revealed to be a secret DEA agent, however, and the police storm in and arrest everyone, including Kim and Allen. At lunch, Nicole has a mental trauma when David and Sherry argue about Keith's problem. David proceeds to his press conference, where he reveals the self-defense murder of the rapist, that Keith's only crime was not reporting to the authorities, Ferregamo's murder and the former's sponsors' involvement, and a happy Keith reconciles with David. Jack and Mason head to the location given by the mercenary, and they find only a transformer, before seeing a helicopter flying above them.
| 20 | 20 | "7:00 p.m. – 8:00 p.m." | Stephen Hopkins | Robert Cochran & Howard Gordon | April 16, 2002 | 1AFF19 | 7.70 |
Mason is ordered to return and Jack keeps searching until he finds the entrance before being captured, waking up in a holding room and meeting the warden. Jack tells the warden of his mission, and the warden reveals that it is a DOD facility and a prisoner will be delivered at 7:20, a time Jack asked about. Jack plans a secured delivery and Andre's team are forced by the chief mercenary not to attack, and Jack realizes that the prisoner is Victor Drazen, Andre's father, who was believed to have been killed in the operation. Jack visits Victor and asks him to persuade his sons to stop what they are doing, but the facility is attacked by Andre's group. Meanwhile, Teri and Parslow are transferred by Almeida, while Kim, Allen, and Melanie are all held in custody, where the police don't believe Kim's story after Melanie denies it. David wins the honesty poll after his press conference, but he and Sherry still argue about the consequences of the disclosure.
| 21 | 21 | "8:00 p.m. – 9:00 p.m." | Stephen Hopkins | Joel Surnow & Michael Loceff | April 23, 2002 | 1AFF20 | 8.49 |
Andre's team kills all the agents and corners Jack, who holds Victor while Andre holds the warden, and after Jack is forced to free Victor, the warden is killed and Jack is captured. Chappelle orders Mason to send agents to kill everyone and not try to save Jack, as Victor must not be disclosed to be alive for the government's reputation. The CTU agents arrive after Victor's group is gone, and Victor chooses to keep Jack alive instead of killing him after Jack reveals that Alexis is still alive. Meanwhile, Teri is brought to CTU and begins to remember everything. After Kim has an argument with Melanie in custody room, an inmate throws a joint at Melanie to avoid capture, but Kim reveals the truth and the former is taken away. Melanie confirms Kim's statement to the police and Kim is arranged for transfer to CTU, but the vehicle is attacked by mercenaries on the way and she is abducted. David wins the primaries in the states holding the Super Tuesday, and he and his assistant Patricia Brooks get closer now that he is distant to Sherry.
| 22 | 22 | "9:00 p.m. – 10:00 p.m." | Paul Shapiro | Joel Surnow & Michael Loceff | May 7, 2002 | 1AFF21 | 7.56 |
After talking to Alexis on the phone and getting confirmation that he is alive, Victor offers CTU the exchange of Alexis with Jack, though Mason is ordered to deny it, while Myers calls David, reports the situation and asks for help. Victor is welcomed by his friend and the latter's daughter, and Jack takes the woman hostage to escape, but Victor chooses to kill her and keep him. The father gets angry and attacks Victor, who is forced to kill him as well, while Jack finds out about Kim's predicament. David offers Mason a promotion when David assumes the Oval Office if Mason agrees to perform the exchange. Alexis is returned and the tracker planted is found and thrown away. On another location, Jack is freed after he is informed that Kim will be killed if he doesn't follow instructions after release. Brooks is revealed to be hired by Sherry to get involved with David.
| 23 | 23 | "10:00 p.m. – 11:00 p.m." | Paul Shapiro | Robert Cochran & Howard Gordon | May 14, 2002 | 1AFF22 | 8.47 |
David arranges a tryst with Brooks, but in the room, he reveals that he knows about Sherry's plan and fires Brooks from his staff. Jack is instructed to go and visit David in his hotel, where he convinces David to order Secret Service to let him through. Alexis succumbs to his wound, and Andre decides to kill Kim for it, but Victor stops him. After Jack calls Victor by his cell phone and gives it to David, it is revealed that the phone contains a bomb intended to kill them both, but Jack throws it away in time and they survive. The former convinces David not to reveal his survival to the press until the former saves Kim, though Sherry disagrees with their decision. Andre calls Jack and gets confirmation of David's death, and Jack offers himself in exchange for Kim's release, which is accepted and Jack is informed of the location. Before he heads for the location, Teri calls Jack and tells him about the baby. While Kim manages to escape capture, Myers secretly reports David's survival to Andre, revealing that she has been the mole all along.
| 24 | 24 | "11:00 p.m. – 12:00 a.m." | Stephen Hopkins | Teleplay by : Joel Surnow & Michael Loceff; Story by : Robert Cochran & Howard Gordon | May 21, 2002 | 1AFF23 | 9.25 |
The press reveals that David has survived the explosion confirmed by an inside source; he deduces it to be Sherry and confronts her. The press reveals Jack's involvement in saving David, who decides to divorce Sherry, fully knowing that Sherry used their marriage to further her own political ambitions. Victor instructs Myers to tell Jack that Kim has been killed in order to pull him to a fight, and Myers does so, but Victor's plan backfires as Jack manages to kill the Drazens and all of their men in a vicious shootout, before killing Victor last after a brief confrontation. Jack is informed that Kim is alive, and in the meantime, a video is found that shows Myers killing Farrell while Farrell was cuffed. Myers finds out about Jack's actions and calls her German handler for extraction, but Teri finds Myers in a room, where she exposes her true nature to her and ties her to a chair. Mason orders security to find Myers, who kills several agents on her way outside, but Jack arrives and stops her, and after Mason convinces him not to kill her, she is arrested and taken away. Jack reunites with Kim, only to find Teri in the room dead, having already been murdered by Myers, and a horrified and heartbroken Jack cradles his dead wife in his arms.

== Production ==
The first season introduced split screens into 24, a feature which continued to play a role in all of the seasons. Editors originally wanted the boxes showing separate characters to overlap but Stephen Hopkins decided not to do this. The writers were intentionally secretive about whether Teri Bauer would be killed in the final episode. To cast doubt about the outcome, three endings were filmed, two of which showed that Teri survived. Writers Joel Surnow and Robert Cochran originally planned for Teri to survive, but half-way through the season, they decided that a happy ending would not be as satisfying. They instead went with the ending where Teri dies. Surnow explained, "It made the show feel more real. And it gives our audience a sense when they're going to watch the show next season, of not being able to expect anything they’ve come to expect in a normal television show."

=== Trailer ===
The trailer for the first season aired some time between April and November, 2001. The trailer announces that David Palmer may become the first black U.S. president and shows Jack Bauer learning about the assassination attempt and corruption within his agency. Notably, the trailer shows the explosion of a commercial plane that was edited out of the show in response to the September 11 attacks. All other scenes shown are from the premiere episode.

== Reception ==
The first season received universal acclaim, scoring a Metacritic rating of 88/100 based on 27 reviews. On Rotten Tomatoes, the season has an approval rating of 95% with an average score of 8.7 out of 10 based on 21 reviews. The website's critical consensus reads, "Brimming with tension and political intrigue, 24 successfully introduces its unique, high-concept format and a compelling hero worth watching in Kiefer Sutherland's Jack Bauer."

Kiefer Sutherland won the Golden Globe Award for Best Actor – Television Series Drama and the Satellite Award for Best Actor – Television Series Drama for his role as Jack Bauer for this season. In 2009, the season finale ("11:00 p.m. – 12:00 a.m.") was listed in TV Guide's list of the top 100 episodes of all time, at number 10. In 2005, TV Land included the same episode as part of its "100 Most Unexpected Moments in TV History", ranking it number 32. Teri Bauer's death at the end of the finale was voted by TV Guide as the second-most shocking death in television history.

=== Award nominations ===
| Organization | Category | Nominee(s) | Result |
|---|---|---|---|
| Primetime Emmy Awards | Outstanding Drama Series | Robert Cochran, Howard Gordon, Brian Grazer, Stephen Hopkins, Tony Krantz, Joel Surnow, Cyrus Yavneh | Nominated |
| Primetime Emmy Awards | Outstanding Lead Actor in a Drama Series | Kiefer Sutherland | Nominated |
| Primetime Emmy Awards | Outstanding Directing for a Drama Series | Stephen Hopkins | Nominated |
| Primetime Emmy Awards | Outstanding Writing for a Drama Series | Robert Cochran, Joel Surnow | Won |
| Primetime Emmy Awards | Outstanding Single-Camera Picture Editing for a Series | Chris Willingham | Won |
| Primetime Emmy Awards | Outstanding Single-Camera Picture Editing for a Series | David Thompson | Nominated |
| Primetime Emmy Awards | Outstanding Art Direction for a Single-Camera Series | Carlos Barbosa, Tim Beach, Ellen Brill | Nominated |
| Primetime Emmy Awards | Outstanding Casting for a Drama Series | Debi Manwiller | Nominated |
| Primetime Emmy Awards | Outstanding Music Composition for a Series, Dramatic Underscore | Sean Callery | Nominated |
| Primetime Emmy Awards | Outstanding Single-Camera Sound Mixing for a Series | William Gocke, Mike Olman, Ken Kobett | Nominated |
| Golden Globe Awards | Best Drama Series | | Nominated |
| Golden Globe Awards | Best Actor in a Drama Series | Kiefer Sutherland | Won |
| Screen Actors Guild Awards | Outstanding Performance by a Male Actor in a Drama Series | Kiefer Sutherland | Nominated |
| Screen Actors Guild Awards | Outstanding Performance by an Ensemble in a Drama Series | Xander Berkeley, Carlos Bernard, Jude Ciccolella, Sarah Clarke, Elisha Cuthbert, Michelle Forbes, Laura Harris, Dennis Haysbert, Leslie Hope, Penny Johnson Jerald, Phillip Rhys, Kiefer Sutherland, Sarah Wynter | Nominated |
| Satellite Awards | Best Drama Series | | Won |
| Satellite Awards | Best Actor in a Drama Series | Kiefer Sutherland | Won |
| Directors Guild of America Awards | Best Directing for a Drama Series | Stephen Hopkins | Nominated |
| Television Critics Association Awards | Best New Program of the Year | | Won |
| Television Critics Association Awards | Best Program of the Year | | Won |
| Television Critics Association Awards | Outstanding Achievement in Drama | | Nominated |
| Television Critics Association Awards | Individual Achievement in Drama | Kiefer Sutherland | Nominated |

== Home media releases ==
The first season was released on DVD in region 1 on September 17, 2002, and in region 2 on October 14, 2002. A special-edition version was released in region 1 on May 20, 2008. The season 1 DVD features an alternative ending in which Teri Bauer survives.
