= List of 24 episodes =

24 title card. The television series, created by Joel Surnow and Robert Cochran, first aired on Fox on November 6, 2001.

24 is an American dramatic action/thriller television series co-created by Joel Surnow and Robert Cochran that premiered on Fox on November 6, 2001. The show centers on the fictitious Los Angeles branch of the U.S. government's "Counter Terrorist Unit" (CTU). The series is presented in real time format; each one-hour episode depicts one hour's worth of events, and each season is a 24-hour period in the life of protagonist Jack Bauer (played by Kiefer Sutherland), a CTU agent. The first six seasons of the show are set in Los Angeles and nearby locations – both real and fictional – in California, although other locations have been featured. The television film Redemption is primarily set in the fictional African country, Sangala. The seventh shifts locations to Washington, D.C., and the eighth season is set in New York City. The ninth season Live Another Day takes place in London.

The first three seasons aired over a complete television season between October and May, taking hiatuses between blocks of episodes. Beginning with the fourth season, Fox scheduled 24 to premiere midseason in January with a two-night four-hour premiere, with new episodes airing every week until a two-hour finale in May. Season seven was due to premiere on January 13, 2008, but was delayed an entire year due to the 2007–08 Writers Guild of America strike. Fox aired a two-hour "prequel" film, 24: Redemption, on November 23, 2008, that bridges the gap between seasons six and seven. Season seven premiered on January 11, 2009, with a four-hour premiere over two consecutive nights. Fox announced that the eighth season would be the final season of 24, with the series finale airing May 24, 2010. With the conclusion of the eighth season, 24 aired a total of 192 episodes and the 2-hour television film, 24: Redemption. In 2013, Fox announced that 24 would return with a ninth season titled 24: Live Another Day containing 12 episodes which debuted on May 5, 2014.

Episodes of 24 are also available in various new media formats. All eight seasons and 24: Redemption are available to purchase as DVD boxsets. Fox provided the five episodes at a time as they were released to Hulu and Fox on Demand, the joint venture it holds with NBC to provide video on demand of the two networks' shows. In the United States and United Kingdom, every episode is available at the iTunes Store to download and playback on home computers and certain iPods.

A total of 204 episodes of 24 aired over nine seasons, from November 6, 2001, to July 14, 2014.

== Series overview ==
Season	Episodes	Originally released	
Season	Episodes	First released	Last released
Day 1	24	November 6, 2001	May 21, 2002
Day 2	24	October 29, 2002	May 20, 2003
Day 3	24	October 28, 2003	May 25, 2004
Day 4	24	January 9, 2005	May 23, 2005
Day 5	24	January 15, 2006	May 22, 2006
Day 6	24	January 14, 2007	May 21, 2007
Redemption	1	November 23, 2008	
Day 7	24	January 11, 2009	May 18, 2009
Day 8	24	January 17, 2010	May 24, 2010
Live Another Day	12	May 5, 2014	July 14, 2014

== Episodes ==
=== Season 1 (2001–02) ===
No. overall	No. in season	Title	Directed by	Written by	Original release date	Prod. code	US viewers (millions)
1	1	"12:00 a.m. – 1:00 a.m."	Stephen Hopkins	Robert Cochran & Joel Surnow	November 6, 2001	1AFF79	11.64
2	2	"1:00 a.m. – 2:00 a.m."	Stephen Hopkins	Joel Surnow & Michael Loceff	November 13, 2001	1AFF01	8.77
3	3	"2:00 a.m. – 3:00 a.m."	Stephen Hopkins	Joel Surnow & Michael Loceff	November 20, 2001	1AFF02	8.18
4	4	"3:00 a.m. – 4:00 a.m."	Winrich Kolbe	Robert Cochran	November 27, 2001	1AFF03	9.15
5	5	"4:00 a.m. – 5:00 a.m."	Winrich Kolbe	Chip Johannessen	December 11, 2001	1AFF04	7.61
6	6	"5:00 a.m. – 6:00 a.m."	Bryan Spicer	Howard Gordon	December 18, 2001	1AFF05	8.17
7	7	"6:00 a.m. – 7:00 a.m."	Bryan Spicer	Andrea Newman	January 8, 2002	1AFF06	8.31
8	8	"7:00 a.m. – 8:00 a.m."	Stephen Hopkins	Joel Surnow & Michael Loceff	January 15, 2002	1AFF07	7.51
9	9	"8:00 a.m. – 9:00 a.m."	Stephen Hopkins	Virgil Williams	January 22, 2002	1AFF08	9.10
10	10	"9:00 a.m. – 10:00 a.m."	Davis Guggenheim	Lawrence Hertzog	February 5, 2002	1AFF09	9.25
11	11	"10:00 a.m. – 11:00 a.m."	Davis Guggenheim	Robert Cochran	February 12, 2002	1AFF10	7.60
12	12	"11:00 a.m. – 12:00 p.m."	Stephen Hopkins	Howard Gordon	February 19, 2002	1AFF11	7.98
13	13	"12:00 p.m. – 1:00 p.m."	Stephen Hopkins	Andrea Newman	February 26, 2002	1AFF12	8.93
14	14	"1:00 p.m. – 2:00 p.m."	Jon Cassar	Joel Surnow & Michael Loceff	March 5, 2002	1AFF13	8.18
15	15	"2:00 p.m. – 3:00 p.m."	Jon Cassar	Michael S. Chernuchin	March 12, 2002	1AFF14	8.86
16	16	"3:00 p.m. – 4:00 p.m."	Stephen Hopkins	Robert Cochran & Howard Gordon	March 19, 2002	1AFF15	9.20
17	17	"4:00 p.m. – 5:00 p.m."	Stephen Hopkins	Michael S. Chernuchin	March 26, 2002	1AFF16	9.33
18	18	"5:00 p.m. – 6:00 p.m."	Frederick King Keller	Maurice Hurley	April 2, 2002	1AFF17	8.72
19	19	"6:00 p.m. – 7:00 p.m."	Frederick King Keller	Joel Surnow & Michael Loceff	April 9, 2002	1AFF18	8.84
20	20	"7:00 p.m. – 8:00 p.m."	Stephen Hopkins	Robert Cochran & Howard Gordon	April 16, 2002	1AFF19	7.70
21	21	"8:00 p.m. – 9:00 p.m."	Stephen Hopkins	Joel Surnow & Michael Loceff	April 23, 2002	1AFF20	8.49
22	22	"9:00 p.m. – 10:00 p.m."	Paul Shapiro	Joel Surnow & Michael Loceff	May 7, 2002	1AFF21	7.56
23	23	"10:00 p.m. – 11:00 p.m."	Paul Shapiro	Robert Cochran & Howard Gordon	May 14, 2002	1AFF22	8.47
24	24	"11:00 p.m. – 12:00 a.m."	Stephen Hopkins	Teleplay by : Joel Surnow & Michael Loceff; Story by : Robert Cochran & Howard Gordon	May 21, 2002	1AFF23	9.25

=== Season 2 (2002–03) ===
No. overall	No. in season	Title	Directed by	Written by	Original release date	Prod. code	US viewers (millions)
25	1	"Day 2: 8:00 a.m. – 9:00 a.m."	Jon Cassar	Joel Surnow & Michael Loceff	October 29, 2002	2AFF01	13.50
26	2	"Day 2: 9:00 a.m. – 10:00 a.m."	Jon Cassar	Joel Surnow & Michael Loceff	November 5, 2002	2AFF02	11.88
27	3	"Day 2: 10:00 a.m. – 11:00 a.m."	James Whitmore, Jr.	Howard Gordon	November 12, 2002	2AFF03	9.88
28	4	"Day 2: 11:00 a.m. – 12:00 p.m."	James Whitmore, Jr.	Remi Aubuchon	November 19, 2002	2AFF04	9.91
29	5	"Day 2: 12:00 p.m. – 1:00 p.m."	Jon Cassar	Gil Grant	November 26, 2002	2AFF05	9.13
30	6	"Day 2: 1:00 p.m. – 2:00 p.m."	Jon Cassar	Elizabeth M. Cosin	December 3, 2002	2AFF06	11.13
31	7	"Day 2: 2:00 p.m. – 3:00 p.m."	James Whitmore, Jr.	Virgil Williams	December 10, 2002	2AFF07	9.82
32	8	"Day 2: 3:00 p.m. – 4:00 p.m."	James Whitmore, Jr.	Joel Surnow & Michael Loceff	December 17, 2002	2AFF08	9.42
33	9	"Day 2: 4:00 p.m. – 5:00 p.m."	Rodney Charters	Howard Gordon	January 7, 2003	2AFF09	9.97
34	10	"Day 2: 5:00 p.m. – 6:00 p.m."	Rodney Charters	David Ehrman	January 14, 2003	2AFF10	10.41
35	11	"Day 2: 6:00 p.m. – 7:00 p.m."	Frederick King Keller	Gil Grant	February 4, 2003	2AFF11	12.62
36	12	"Day 2: 7:00 p.m. – 8:00 p.m."	Frederick King Keller	Evan Katz	February 11, 2003	2AFF12	12.33
37	13	"Day 2: 8:00 p.m. – 9:00 p.m."	Jon Cassar	Maurice Hurley	February 18, 2003	2AFF13	13.14
38	14	"Day 2: 9:00 p.m. – 10:00 p.m."	Jon Cassar	Joel Surnow & Michael Loceff	February 25, 2003	2AFF14	12.64
39	15	"Day 2: 10:00 p.m. – 11:00 p.m."	Ian Toynton	Robert Cochran	March 4, 2003	2AFF15	13.15
40	16	"Day 2: 11:00 p.m. – 12:00 a.m."	Ian Toynton	Howard Gordon & Evan Katz	March 25, 2003	2AFF16	12.09
41	17	"Day 2: 12:00 a.m. – 1:00 a.m."	Jon Cassar	Evan Katz & Gil Grant	April 1, 2003	2AFF17	12.48
42	18	"Day 2: 1:00 a.m. – 2:00 a.m."	Jon Cassar	Joel Surnow & Michael Loceff	April 8, 2003	2AFF18	11.75
43	19	"Day 2: 2:00 a.m. – 3:00 a.m."	James Whitmore, Jr.	Howard Gordon	April 15, 2003	2AFF19	11.77
44	20	"Day 2: 3:00 a.m. – 4:00 a.m."	James Whitmore, Jr.	Neil Cohen	April 22, 2003	2AFF20	11.94
45	21	"Day 2: 4:00 a.m. – 5:00 a.m."	Ian Toynton	Robert Cochran & Howard Gordon	April 29, 2003	2AFF21	12.05
46	22	"Day 2: 5:00 a.m. – 6:00 a.m."	Ian Toynton	Virgil Williams & Duppy Demetrius	May 6, 2003	2AFF22	13.49
47	23	"Day 2: 6:00 a.m. – 7:00 a.m."	Jon Cassar	Gil Grant & Evan Katz	May 13, 2003	2AFF23	12.72
48	24	"Day 2: 7:00 a.m. – 8:00 a.m."	Jon Cassar	Teleplay by : Joel Surnow & Michael Loceff; Story by : Robert Cochran & Howard Gordon	May 20, 2003	2AFF24	14.20

=== Season 3 (2003–04) ===
No. overall	No. in season	Title	Directed by	Written by	Original release date	Prod. code	US viewers (millions)
49	1	"Day 3: 1:00 p.m. – 2:00 p.m."	Jon Cassar	Joel Surnow & Michael Loceff	October 28, 2003	3AFF01	11.57
50	2	"Day 3: 2:00 p.m. – 3:00 p.m."	Jon Cassar	Joel Surnow & Michael Loceff	November 4, 2003	3AFF02	8.69
51	3	"Day 3: 3:00 p.m. – 4:00 p.m."	Ian Toynton	Howard Gordon	November 11, 2003	3AFF03	8.84
52	4	"Day 3: 4:00 p.m. – 5:00 p.m."	Ian Toynton	Stephen Kronish	November 18, 2003	3AFF04	8.35
53	5	"Day 3: 5:00 p.m. – 6:00 p.m."	Jon Cassar	Evan Katz	November 25, 2003	3AFF05	9.75
54	6	"Day 3: 6:00 p.m. – 7:00 p.m."	Jon Cassar	Duppy Demetrius	December 2, 2003	3AFF06	10.51
55	7	"Day 3: 7:00 p.m. – 8:00 p.m."	Ian Toynton	Robert Cochran & Howard Gordon	December 9, 2003	3AFF07	8.87
56	8	"Day 3: 8:00 p.m. – 9:00 p.m."	Ian Toynton	Robert Cochran & Howard Gordon	December 16, 2003	3AFF08	8.97
57	9	"Day 3: 9:00 p.m. – 10:00 p.m."	Brad Turner	Teleplay by : Evan Katz & Stephen Kronish; Story by : Robert Cochran & Howard Gordon	January 6, 2004	3AFF09	9.31
58	10	"Day 3: 10:00 p.m. – 11:00 p.m."	Brad Turner	Joel Surnow & Michael Loceff	January 13, 2004	3AFF10	8.67
59	11	"Day 3: 11:00 p.m. – 12:00 a.m."	Jon Cassar	Joel Surnow & Michael Loceff	January 27, 2004	3AFF11	11.14
60	12	"Day 3: 12:00 a.m. – 1:00 a.m."	Jon Cassar	Teleplay by : Robert Cochran & Howard Gordon; Story by : Evan Katz & Stephen Kronish	February 3, 2004	3AFF12	11.32
61	13	"Day 3: 1:00 a.m. – 2:00 a.m."	Bryan Spicer	Teleplay by : Joel Surnow & Michael Loceff; Story by : Robert Cochran & Stephen Kronish	February 10, 2004	3AFF13	9.97
62	14	"Day 3: 2:00 a.m. – 3:00 a.m."	Bryan Spicer	Howard Gordon & Evan Katz	February 17, 2004	3AFF14	10.05
63	15	"Day 3: 3:00 a.m. – 4:00 a.m."	Kevin Hooks	Teleplay by : Robert Cochran & Howard Gordon; Story by : Michael Loceff	February 24, 2004	3AFF15	10.50
64	16	"Day 3: 4:00 a.m. – 5:00 a.m."	Kevin Hooks	Evan Katz & Stephen Kronish	March 30, 2004	3AFF16	11.50
65	17	"Day 3: 5:00 a.m. – 6:00 a.m."	Ian Toynton	Robert Cochran & Stephen Kronish	April 6, 2004	3AFF17	10.77
66	18	"Day 3: 6:00 a.m. – 7:00 a.m."	Ian Toynton	Howard Gordon & Evan Katz	April 18, 2004	3AFF18	6.47
67	19	"Day 3: 7:00 a.m. – 8:00 a.m."	Jon Cassar	Michael Loceff	April 20, 2004	3AFF19	10.54
68	20	"Day 3: 8:00 a.m. – 9:00 a.m."	Jon Cassar	Virgil Williams	April 27, 2004	3AFF20	11.13
69	21	"Day 3: 9:00 a.m. – 10:00 a.m."	Frederick King Keller	Joel Surnow & Michael Loceff	May 4, 2004	3AFF21	11.09
70	22	"Day 3: 10:00 a.m. – 11:00 a.m."	Frederick King Keller	Teleplay by : Evan Katz & Stephen Kronish; Story by : Robert Cochran & Howard Gordon	May 11, 2004	3AFF22	12.19
71	23	"Day 3: 11:00 a.m. – 12:00 p.m."	Jon Cassar	Teleplay by : Robert Cochran & Howard Gordon; Story by : Evan Katz & Stephen Kronish	May 18, 2004	3AFF23	10.97
72	24	"Day 3: 12:00 p.m. – 1:00 p.m."	Jon Cassar	Joel Surnow & Michael Loceff	May 25, 2004	3AFF24	12.31

=== Season 4 (2005) ===
No. overall	No. in season	Title	Directed by	Written by	Original release date	Prod. code	US viewers (millions)
73	1	"Day 4: 7:00 a.m. – 8:00 a.m."	Jon Cassar	Joel Surnow & Michael Loceff	January 9, 2005	4AFF01	15.31
74	2	"Day 4: 8:00 a.m. – 9:00 a.m."	Jon Cassar	Howard Gordon	January 9, 2005	4AFF02	14.34
75	3	"Day 4: 9:00 a.m. – 10:00 a.m."	Brad Turner	Evan Katz	January 10, 2005	4AFF03	11.91
76	4	"Day 4: 10:00 a.m. – 11:00 a.m."	Brad Turner	Stephen Kronish	January 10, 2005	4AFF04	13.35
77	5	"Day 4: 11:00 a.m. – 12:00 p.m."	Jon Cassar	Peter M. Lenkov	January 17, 2005	4AFF05	11.51
78	6	"Day 4: 12:00 p.m. – 1:00 p.m."	Jon Cassar	Matt Michnovetz	January 24, 2005	4AFF06	12.20
79	7	"Day 4: 1:00 p.m. – 2:00 p.m."	Ken Girotti	Joel Surnow & Michael Loceff	January 31, 2005	4AFF07	11.52
80	8	"Day 4: 2:00 p.m. – 3:00 p.m."	Ken Girotti	Teleplay by : Stephen Kronish & Peter M. Lenkov; Story by : Matt Michnovetz	February 7, 2005	4AFF08	11.10
81	9	"Day 4: 3:00 p.m. – 4:00 p.m."	Brad Turner	Howard Gordon & Evan Katz	February 14, 2005	4AFF09	11.42
82	10	"Day 4: 4:00 p.m. – 5:00 p.m."	Brad Turner	Stephen Kronish & Peter M. Lenkov	February 21, 2005	4AFF10	13.16
83	11	"Day 4: 5:00 p.m. – 6:00 p.m."	Jon Cassar	Joel Surnow & Michael Loceff	February 28, 2005	4AFF11	14.55
84	12	"Day 4: 6:00 p.m. – 7:00 p.m."	Jon Cassar	Howard Gordon & Evan Katz	March 7, 2005	4AFF12	13.09
85	13	"Day 4: 7:00 p.m. – 8:00 p.m."	Rodney Charters	Anne Cofell Saunders	March 14, 2005	4AFF13	12.05
86	14	"Day 4: 8:00 p.m. – 9:00 p.m."	Tim Iacofano	Howard Gordon & Evan Katz	March 21, 2005	4AFF14	11.55
87	15	"Day 4: 9:00 p.m. – 10:00 p.m."	Bryan Spicer	Joel Surnow & Michael Loceff	March 28, 2005	4AFF15	11.58
88	16	"Day 4: 10:00 p.m. – 11:00 p.m."	Bryan Spicer	Teleplay by : Howard Gordon & Evan Katz; Story by : Robert Cochran	April 4, 2005	4AFF16	11.06
89	17	"Day 4: 11:00 p.m. – 12:00 a.m."	Jon Cassar	Duppy Demetrius	April 11, 2005	4AFF17	11.64
90	18	"Day 4: 12:00 a.m. – 1:00 a.m."	Jon Cassar	Joel Surnow & Michael Loceff	April 18, 2005	4AFF18	11.08
91	19	"Day 4: 1:00 a.m. – 2:00 a.m."	Bryan Spicer	Howard Gordon & Evan Katz	April 25, 2005	4AFF19	11.03
92	20	"Day 4: 2:00 a.m. – 3:00 a.m."	Bryan Spicer	Peter M. Lenkov	May 2, 2005	4AFF20	10.88
93	21	"Day 4: 3:00 a.m. – 4:00 a.m."	Kevin Hooks	Joel Surnow & Michael Loceff	May 9, 2005	4AFF21	11.00
94	22	"Day 4: 4:00 a.m. – 5:00 a.m."	Kevin Hooks	Matt Michnovetz & Duppy Demetrius	May 16, 2005	4AFF22	11.67
95	23	"Day 4: 5:00 a.m. – 6:00 a.m."	Jon Cassar	Sam Montgomery	May 23, 2005	4AFF23	12.23
96	24	"Day 4: 6:00 a.m. – 7:00 a.m."	Jon Cassar	Robert Cochran & Howard Gordon	May 23, 2005	4AFF24	12.23

=== Season 5 (2006) ===
No. overall	No. in season	Title	Directed by	Written by	Original release date	Prod. code	US viewers (millions)
97	1	"Day 5: 7:00 a.m. – 8:00 a.m."	Jon Cassar	Howard Gordon	January 15, 2006	5AFF01	17.01
98	2	"Day 5: 8:00 a.m. – 9:00 a.m."	Jon Cassar	Evan Katz	January 15, 2006	5AFF02	15.48
99	3	"Day 5: 9:00 a.m. – 10:00 a.m."	Brad Turner	Manny Coto	January 16, 2006	5AFF03	14.08
100	4	"Day 5: 10:00 a.m. – 11:00 a.m."	Brad Turner	Joel Surnow & Michael Loceff	January 16, 2006	5AFF04	15.70
101	5	"Day 5: 11:00 a.m. – 12:00 p.m."	Jon Cassar	Joel Surnow & Michael Loceff	January 23, 2006	5AFF05	14.22
102	6	"Day 5: 12:00 p.m. – 1:00 p.m."	Jon Cassar	David Fury	January 30, 2006	5AFF06	13.82
103	7	"Day 5: 1:00 p.m. – 2:00 p.m."	Brad Turner	Manny Coto	February 6, 2006	5AFF07	13.70
104	8	"Day 5: 2:00 p.m. – 3:00 p.m."	Brad Turner	Robert Cochran & Evan Katz	February 13, 2006	5AFF08	12.82
105	9	"Day 5: 3:00 p.m. – 4:00 p.m."	Tim Iacofano	Howard Gordon & David Fury	February 20, 2006	5AFF09	13.70
106	10	"Day 5: 4:00 p.m. – 5:00 p.m."	Tim Iacofano	Joel Surnow & Michael Loceff	February 27, 2006	5AFF10	13.87
107	11	"Day 5: 5:00 p.m. – 6:00 p.m."	Jon Cassar	Nicole Ranadive	March 6, 2006	5AFF11	11.89
108	12	"Day 5: 6:00 p.m. – 7:00 p.m."	Jon Cassar	Duppy Demetrius & Matt Michnovetz	March 6, 2006	5AFF12	13.98
109	13	"Day 5: 7:00 p.m. – 8:00 p.m."	Brad Turner	Joel Surnow & Michael Loceff	March 13, 2006	5AFF13	13.72
110	14	"Day 5: 8:00 p.m. – 9:00 p.m."	Brad Turner	Teleplay by : Howard Gordon & Evan Katz< Story by : Sam Montgomery	March 20, 2006	5AFF14	13.71
111	15	"Day 5: 9:00 p.m. – 10:00 p.m."	Jon Cassar	David Ehrman	March 27, 2006	5AFF15	14.50
112	16	"Day 5: 10:00 p.m. – 11:00 p.m."	Jon Cassar	Manny Coto & Sam Montgomery	April 3, 2006	5AFF16	12.47
113	17	"Day 5: 11:00 p.m. – 12:00 a.m."	Brad Turner	David Fury	April 10, 2006	5AFF17	12.49
114	18	"Day 5: 12:00 a.m. – 1:00 a.m."	Brad Turner	Howard Gordon	April 17, 2006	5AFF18	13.26
115	19	"Day 5: 1:00 a.m. – 2:00 a.m."	Dwight Little	Steven Long Mitchell & Craig Van Sickle	April 24, 2006	5AFF19	13.04
116	20	"Day 5: 2:00 a.m. – 3:00 a.m."	Dwight Little	Joel Surnow & Michael Loceff	May 1, 2006	5AFF20	13.15
117	21	"Day 5: 3:00 a.m. – 4:00 a.m."	Brad Turner	Manny Coto	May 8, 2006	5AFF21	13.86
118	22	"Day 5: 4:00 a.m. – 5:00 a.m."	Brad Turner	David Fury & Sam Montgomery	May 15, 2006	5AFF22	13.16
119	23	"Day 5: 5:00 a.m. – 6:00 a.m."	Jon Cassar	Howard Gordon & Evan Katz	May 22, 2006	5AFF23	13.75
120	24	"Day 5: 6:00 a.m. – 7:00 a.m."	Jon Cassar	Robert Cochran	May 22, 2006	5AFF24	13.75

=== Season 6 (2007) ===
No. overall	No. in season	Title	Directed by	Written by	Original release date	Prod. code	US viewers (millions)
121	1	"Day 6: 6:00 a.m. – 7:00 a.m."	Jon Cassar	Howard Gordon	January 14, 2007	6AFF01	15.79
122	2	"Day 6: 7:00 a.m. – 8:00 a.m."	Jon Cassar	Manny Coto	January 14, 2007	6AFF02	15.79
123	3	"Day 6: 8:00 a.m. – 9:00 a.m."	Brad Turner	Evan Katz & David Fury	January 15, 2007	6AFF03	15.73
124	4	"Day 6: 9:00 a.m. – 10:00 a.m."	Brad Turner	Robert Cochran	January 15, 2007	6AFF04	15.73
125	5	"Day 6: 10:00 a.m. – 11:00 a.m."	Milan Cheylov	Joel Surnow & Michael Loceff	January 22, 2007	6AFF05	14.47
126	6	"Day 6: 11:00 a.m. – 12:00 p.m."	Milan Cheylov	Joel Surnow & Michael Loceff	January 29, 2007	6AFF06	14.04
127	7	"Day 6: 12:00 p.m. – 1:00 p.m."	Jon Cassar	Howard Gordon & Manny Coto	February 5, 2007	6AFF07	13.60
128	8	"Day 6: 1:00 p.m. – 2:00 p.m."	Jon Cassar	Evan Katz & David Fury	February 12, 2007	6AFF08	13.12
129	9	"Day 6: 2:00 p.m. – 3:00 p.m."	Brad Turner	Adam E. Fierro	February 12, 2007	6AFF09	13.73
130	10	"Day 6: 3:00 p.m. – 4:00 p.m."	Brad Turner	Howard Gordon & Evan Katz	February 19, 2007	6AFF10	13.05
131	11	"Day 6: 4:00 p.m. – 5:00 p.m."	Tim Iacofano	Manny Coto	February 26, 2007	6AFF11	12.80
132	12	"Day 6: 5:00 p.m. – 6:00 p.m."	Tim Iacofano	Teleplay by : Evan Katz & David Fury; Story by : Howard Gordon	March 5, 2007	6AFF12	13.05
133	13	"Day 6: 6:00 p.m. – 7:00 p.m."	Jon Cassar	Joel Surnow & Michael Loceff	March 12, 2007	6AFF13	12.39
134	14	"Day 6: 7:00 p.m. – 8:00 p.m."	Jon Cassar	Teleplay by : Howard Gordon & Evan Katz; Story by : Manny Coto & David Fury	March 19, 2007	6AFF14	11.80
135	15	"Day 6: 8:00 p.m. – 9:00 p.m."	Brad Turner	Howard Gordon & Manny Coto	March 26, 2007	6AFF15	11.78
136	16	"Day 6: 9:00 p.m. – 10:00 p.m."	Brad Turner	Robert Cochran & Evan Katz	April 2, 2007	6AFF16	10.95
137	17	"Day 6: 10:00 p.m. – 11:00 p.m."	Bryan Spicer	David Fury	April 9, 2007	6AFF17	11.45
138	18	"Day 6: 11:00 p.m. – 12:00 a.m."	Bryan Spicer	Matt Michnovetz & Nicole Ranadive	April 16, 2007	6AFF18	11.32
139	19	"Day 6: 12:00 a.m. – 1:00 a.m."	Brad Turner	Joel Surnow & Michael Loceff	April 23, 2007	6AFF19	10.41
140	20	"Day 6: 1:00 a.m. – 2:00 a.m."	Brad Turner	Howard Gordon & Evan Katz	April 30, 2007	6AFF20	10.93
141	21	"Day 6: 2:00 a.m. – 3:00 a.m."	Bryan Spicer	Manny Coto	May 7, 2007	6AFF21	10.92
142	22	"Day 6: 3:00 a.m. – 4:00 a.m."	Bryan Spicer	Howard Gordon & Evan Katz	May 14, 2007	6AFF22	10.57
143	23	"Day 6: 4:00 a.m. – 5:00 a.m."	Brad Turner	Joel Surnow & Michael Loceff	May 21, 2007	6AFF23	10.31
144	24	"Day 6: 5:00 a.m. – 6:00 a.m."	Brad Turner	Robert Cochran & Manny Coto & David Fury	May 21, 2007	6AFF24	10.31

=== Redemption (2008) ===
No.	Title	Directed by	Written by	Original release date	Prod. code	US viewers (millions)
1	24: Redemption	Jon Cassar	Howard Gordon	November 23, 2008	7AFF50	12.12

=== Season 7 (2009) ===
No. overall	No. in season	Title	Directed by	Written by	Original release date	Prod. code	US viewers (millions)
145	1	"Day 7: 8:00 a.m. – 9:00 a.m."	Jon Cassar	Howard Gordon & Joel Surnow & Michael Loceff	January 11, 2009	7AFF01	12.61
146	2	"Day 7: 9:00 a.m. – 10:00 a.m."	Jon Cassar	Teleplay by : Joel Surnow & Michael Loceff; Story by : Howard Gordon & Evan Katz	January 11, 2009	7AFF02	12.61
147	3	"Day 7: 10:00 a.m. – 11:00 a.m."	Brad Turner	Manny Coto & Brannon Braga	January 12, 2009	7AFF03	12.31
148	4	"Day 7: 11:00 a.m. – 12:00 p.m."	Brad Turner	David Fury & Alex Gansa	January 12, 2009	7AFF04	12.31
149	5	"Day 7: 12:00 p.m. – 1:00 p.m."	Jon Cassar	Howard Gordon & Evan Katz	January 19, 2009	7AFF05	12.10
150	6	"Day 7: 1:00 p.m. – 2:00 p.m."	Jon Cassar	Manny Coto & Brannon Braga	January 26, 2009	7AFF06	12.22
151	7	"Day 7: 2:00 p.m. – 3:00 p.m."	Milan Cheylov	Teleplay by : Manny Coto & Brannon Braga; Story by : Michael Loceff	February 2, 2009	7AFF07	11.34
152	8	"Day 7: 3:00 p.m. – 4:00 p.m."	Milan Cheylov	Teleplay by : Robert Cochran & Evan Katz; Story by : David Fury	February 9, 2009	7AFF08	10.61
153	9	"Day 7: 4:00 p.m. – 5:00 p.m."	Milan Cheylov	David Fury	February 16, 2009	7AFF09	11.22
154	10	"Day 7: 5:00 p.m. – 6:00 p.m."	Milan Cheylov	Manny Coto & Brannon Braga	February 23, 2009	7AFF10	11.68
155	11	"Day 7: 6:00 p.m. – 7:00 p.m."	Brad Turner	Alex Gansa	March 2, 2009	7AFF11	11.14
156	12	"Day 7: 7:00 p.m. – 8:00 p.m."	Brad Turner	Teleplay by : Evan Katz; Story by : Manny Coto & Brannon Braga	March 2, 2009	7AFF12	11.14
157	13	"Day 7: 8:00 p.m. – 9:00 p.m."	Brad Turner	Manny Coto & Brannon Braga	March 9, 2009	7AFF13	11.37
158	14	"Day 7: 9:00 p.m. – 10:00 p.m."	Brad Turner	Evan Katz & Juan Carlos Coto	March 16, 2009	7AFF14	11.36
159	15	"Day 7: 10:00 p.m. – 11:00 p.m."	Jon Cassar	Teleplay by : Alex Gansa; Story by : David Fury	March 23, 2009	7AFF15	10.37
160	16	"Day 7: 11:00 p.m. – 12:00 a.m."	Jon Cassar	Manny Coto & Brannon Braga	March 30, 2009	7AFF16	11.27
161	17	"Day 7: 12:00 a.m. – 1:00 a.m."	Brad Turner	Chip Johannessen	April 6, 2009	7AFF17	10.96
162	18	"Day 7: 1:00 a.m. – 2:00 a.m."	Brad Turner	Teleplay by : Manny Coto & Brannon Braga; Story by : Howard Gordon	April 13, 2009	7AFF18	10.86
163	19	"Day 7: 2:00 a.m. – 3:00 a.m."	Michael Klick	David Fury	April 20, 2009	7AFF19	10.34
164	20	"Day 7: 3:00 a.m. – 4:00 a.m."	Michael Klick	Teleplay by : Alex Gansa & Chip Johannessen; Story by : Juan Carlos Coto	April 27, 2009	7AFF20	10.43
165	21	"Day 7: 4:00 a.m. – 5:00 a.m."	Brad Turner	Manny Coto & Brannon Braga	May 4, 2009	7AFF21	10.11
166	22	"Day 7: 5:00 a.m. – 6:00 a.m."	Brad Turner	Evan Katz	May 11, 2009	7AFF22	9.79
167	23	"Day 7: 6:00 a.m. – 7:00 a.m."	Jon Cassar	David Fury & Alex Gansa	May 18, 2009	7AFF23	9.65
168	24	"Day 7: 7:00 a.m. – 8:00 a.m."	Jon Cassar	Teleplay by : Howard Gordon; Story by : Manny Coto & Brannon Braga	May 18, 2009	7AFF24	9.65

=== Season 8 (2010) ===
No. overall	No. in season	Title	Directed by	Written by	Original release date	Prod. code	US viewers (millions)
169	1	"Day 8: 4:00 p.m. – 5:00 p.m."	Brad Turner	Howard Gordon & Evan Katz	January 17, 2010	8AFF01	11.44
170	2	"Day 8: 5:00 p.m. – 6:00 p.m."	Brad Turner	Teleplay by : Manny Coto & Brannon Braga; Story by : Howard Gordon	January 17, 2010	8AFF02	11.44
171	3	"Day 8: 6:00 p.m. – 7:00 p.m."	Milan Cheylov	David Fury & Alex Gansa	January 18, 2010	8AFF03	11.11
172	4	"Day 8: 7:00 p.m. – 8:00 p.m."	Milan Cheylov	Chip Johannessen & Patrick Harbinson	January 18, 2010	8AFF04	11.11
173	5	"Day 8: 8:00 p.m. – 9:00 p.m."	Brad Turner	Teleplay by : Evan Katz & Alex Gansa; Story by : Howard Gordon	January 25, 2010	8AFF05	10.81
174	6	"Day 8: 9:00 p.m. – 10:00 p.m."	Brad Turner	Manny Coto & Brannon Braga	February 1, 2010	8AFF06	9.96
175	7	"Day 8: 10:00 p.m. – 11:00 p.m."	Milan Cheylov	Chip Johannessen & Patrick Harbinson	February 8, 2010	8AFF07	10.27
176	8	"Day 8: 11:00 p.m. – 12:00 a.m."	Milan Cheylov	David Fury	February 15, 2010	8AFF08	8.58
177	9	"Day 8: 12:00 a.m. – 1:00 a.m."	Brad Turner	Teleplay by : Chip Johannessen & Patrick Harbinson; Story by : Alex Gansa	February 22, 2010	8AFF09	8.83
178	10	"Day 8: 1:00 a.m. – 2:00 a.m."	Brad Turner	Manny Coto & Brannon Braga	March 1, 2010	8AFF10	8.63
179	11	"Day 8: 2:00 a.m. – 3:00 a.m."	Nelson McCormick	Evan Katz & David Fury	March 8, 2010	8AFF11	8.86
180	12	"Day 8: 3:00 a.m. – 4:00 a.m."	Nelson McCormick	Chip Johannessen & Patrick Harbinson	March 15, 2010	8AFF12	9.01
181	13	"Day 8: 4:00 a.m. – 5:00 a.m."	Milan Cheylov	Teleplay by : Manny Coto & Brannon Braga; Story by : Howard Gordon	March 22, 2010	8AFF13	8.70
182	14	"Day 8: 5:00 a.m. – 6:00 a.m."	Milan Cheylov	Teleplay by : Alex Gansa; Story by : Evan Katz	March 29, 2010	8AFF14	8.48
183	15	"Day 8: 6:00 a.m. – 7:00 a.m."	Brad Turner	Chip Johannessen & Patrick Harbinson	April 5, 2010	8AFF15	7.42
184	16	"Day 8: 7:00 a.m. – 8:00 a.m."	Brad Turner	Manny Coto & Brannon Braga	April 5, 2010	8AFF16	7.42
185	17	"Day 8: 8:00 a.m. – 9:00 a.m."	Milan Cheylov	David Fury	April 12, 2010	8AFF17	8.33
186	18	"Day 8: 9:00 a.m. – 10:00 a.m."	Milan Cheylov	Chip Johannessen & Patrick Harbinson	April 19, 2010	8AFF18	8.94
187	19	"Day 8: 10:00 a.m. – 11:00 a.m."	Michael Klick	Manny Coto & Brannon Braga	April 26, 2010	8AFF19	9.12
188	20	"Day 8: 11:00 a.m. – 12:00 p.m."	Michael Klick	Teleplay by : Evan Katz & Alex Gansa; Story by : Alex Gansa	May 3, 2010	8AFF20	9.00
189	21	"Day 8: 12:00 p.m. – 1:00 p.m."	Milan Cheylov	Chip Johannessen & Patrick Harbinson	May 10, 2010	8AFF21	8.55
190	22	"Day 8: 1:00 p.m. – 2:00 p.m."	Milan Cheylov	David Fury	May 17, 2010	8AFF22	8.95
191	23	"Day 8: 2:00 p.m. – 3:00 p.m."	Brad Turner	Shauna McGarry & Geoff Aull	May 24, 2010	8AFF23	8.94
192	24	"Day 8: 3:00 p.m. – 4:00 p.m."	Brad Turner	Howard Gordon	May 24, 2010	8AFF24	8.94

=== Live Another Day (2014) ===
No. overall	No. in season	Title	Directed by	Written by	Original release date	Prod. code	US viewers (millions)
193	1	"Day 9: 11:00 a.m. – 12:00 p.m."	Jon Cassar	Evan Katz & Manny Coto	May 5, 2014	9AFF01	8.08
194	2	"Day 9: 12:00 p.m. – 1:00 p.m."	Jon Cassar	Robert Cochran & David Fury	May 5, 2014	9AFF02	8.08
195	3	"Day 9: 1:00 p.m. – 2:00 p.m."	Adam Kane	Sang Kyu Kim & Patrick Somerville	May 12, 2014	9AFF03	6.48
196	4	"Day 9: 2:00 p.m. – 3:00 p.m."	Adam Kane	Patrick Harbinson	May 19, 2014	9AFF04	5.72
197	5	"Day 9: 3:00 p.m. – 4:00 p.m."	Omar Madha	Sang Kyu Kim & Patrick Somerville	May 26, 2014	9AFF05	5.71
198	6	"Day 9: 4:00 p.m. – 5:00 p.m."	Omar Madha	David Fury	June 2, 2014	9AFF06	6.18
199	7	"Day 9: 5:00 p.m. – 6:00 p.m."	Jon Cassar	Tony Basgallop	June 9, 2014	9AFF07	6.28
200	8	"Day 9: 6:00 p.m. – 7:00 p.m."	Jon Cassar	Robert Cochran	June 16, 2014	9AFF08	5.63
201	9	"Day 9: 7:00 p.m. – 8:00 p.m."	Milan Cheylov	Teleplay by : Tony Basgallop & Sang Kyu Kim; Story by : Evan Katz & Manny Coto	June 23, 2014	9AFF09	5.71
202	10	"Day 9: 8:00 p.m. – 9:00 p.m."	Milan Cheylov	Teleplay by : Adam DaSilva; Story by : Robert Cochran & Manny Coto & Evan Katz	June 30, 2014	9AFF10	5.72
203	11	"Day 9: 9:00 p.m. – 10:00 p.m."	Jon Cassar	Robert Cochran & David Fury	July 7, 2014	9AFF11	5.96
204	12	"Day 9: 10:00 p.m. – 11:00 a.m."	Jon Cassar	Manny Coto & Evan Katz	July 14, 2014	9AFF12	6.47
