= 24: Live Another Day =

American television series

- Promotional poster
- Genre: Serial drama; Crime thriller; Espionage; Action
- Created by: Joel Surnow; Robert Cochran
- Starring: Kiefer Sutherland; Yvonne Strahovski; Tate Donovan; Mary Lynn Rajskub; William Devane; Gbenga Akinnagbe; Giles Matthey; Michael Wincott; Benjamin Bratt; Kim Raver
- Music by: Sean Callery
- Country of origin: United States
- Original language: English
- No. of episodes: 12 (list of episodes)

Production
- Executive producers: Brian Grazer; Kiefer Sutherland; Jon Cassar; David Fury; Robert Cochran; Manny Coto; Evan Katz; Howard Gordon
- Production location: London
- Cinematography: Jeffrey C. Mygatt
- Editors: Jordan Goldman; Scott Powell; Casey O. Rohrs; Joe Hobeck
- Running time: 43 minutes
- Production companies: Imagine Television; Real Time Productions; Teakwood Lane Productions; 20th Century Fox Television

Original release
- Network: Fox
- Release: May 5 – July 14, 2014

Related
- 24; 24: Legacy

24: Live Another Day (also known as 24: Season 9 or 24: Day 9) is a 24 limited event television series that aired on Fox from May 5 to July 14, 2014. Sky 1 simulcast the premiere on May 6 in the United Kingdom and Ireland but switched to Wednesday nights for the rest of the episodes. It began airing in Australia on Network Ten on May 12, 2014. Set four years after the events of season 8, it adheres to the real time concept of covering the events of a 24-hour period and begins and ends at 11:00 a.m. However, there is a 12-hour time jump within the final episode.

== Season overview ==
Live Another Day takes place four years after the events of season 8. James Heller, now President of the United States of America, is negotiating a treaty with British Prime Minister Alastair Davies in London, where a hacker collective led by hacker Adrian Cross preaching freedom of information known as Open Cell has enlisted the help of ex-Counter Terrorist Unit Data Analyst Chloe O'Brian. Ex-CTU Agent and federal fugitive Jack Bauer, who has been tracking the activities of Chloe's group while living in exile and being hunted by the CIA, resurfaces when he hears of an imminent assassination attempt on Heller's life.

There are two main acts in Live Another Day:

1. Margot Al-Harazi gains control of six US drones and uses them to attack London.
2. Cheng Zhi attacks his former country China with hijacked American weapons bringing the two countries to the brink of war.

=== Major subplots ===
- Jack Bauer disapproves of the group Chloe O'Brian has joined.
- Margot Al-Harazi grows suspicious of where her daughter's loyalties lie.
- James Heller tries to manage a crisis amid the onset of Alzheimer's disease.
- Mark Boudreau opens himself up to blackmail by forging Heller's signature.
- Kate Morgan has been led to believe that her husband committed treason by selling state secrets.
- The head of the CIA London station, Steve Navarro, is conspiring with the leader of Chloe's group.
- CIA analyst Jordan Reed's hunt for answers puts his life into jeopardy.
- Circumstances reunite Jack and Audrey after nearly a decade.
- America's plans for a treaty are derailed when they lose control of their own weapons.
- Cheng Zhi partners with the Russians who are looking for Jack.

=== Summary ===
While anti-drone protesters gather outside the United States Embassy, where President of the United States James Heller is staying, agents at a CIA station in London find and apprehend federal fugitive and former Counter Terrorist Unit Agent Jack Bauer. Due to her husband's conviction, CIA agent Kate Morgan is being forced to resign. However, she gets herself reinstated when she realizes that Jack is infiltrating the CIA to gain access to ex-CTU Data Analyst turned hacktivist Chloe O'Brian. Kate is too late to intervene and Jack breaks Chloe out of interrogation with the help of his friend Belcheck, an ex-Serbian Mob enforcer. Still distrustful of Chloe, Jack follows her to Open Cell, a hacker collective that specializes in leaking government documents and preaching freedom of information. He explains that he is on the trail of Derrick Yates, a former Open Cell member who has become involved in an assassination attempt on James Heller. The attempt is revealed to involve drones when he programs an unmanned aerial vehicle to fire on British and American troops. The pilot, United States Air Force First Lieutenant Chris Tanner, is falsely arrested on murder charges.

Jack and Chloe learn that Yates' device has been taken by Margot Al-Harazi, a designated terrorist trying to avenge the death of her husband, Mahmoud. When their attempt to capture her daughter Simone fails, Jack breaks into the United States Embassy to analyze Tanner's flight key and prove that the threat is imminent. Jack locks himself in a room with three hostages and tries to upload the data to Open Cell's leader, Adrian Cross. Marines break in before the upload finishes but Kate Morgan is able to place him in CIA custody instead. In the President's quarters, Chief of Staff Mark Boudreau expresses concerns that Bauer is a designated terrorist and drafts an agreement for extraditing him to Russia. Suspecting that dementia has clouded Heller's judgement, he forges the President's signature and vows to protect his wife Audrey from any further pain related to Bauer. Jack is ultimately proven right when Margot broadcasts a video calling for Heller to turn himself in or face attacks on London from six U.S. drones.

When Simone's husband Navid tries to sabotage the attacks, Margot executes Navid, leaving her son Ian to pilot the drones. She sends Simone to silence Navid's family. When a missile kills several CIA agents, Heller authorizes Bauer to go undercover with an arms dealer known for working with Al-Harazi. From transaction records, they are able to track Simone and see that she has been struck by traffic in her pursuit of Navid's niece. When Margot learns that Simone is being interrogated in the hospital, she sends a drone to destroy it. Jack and Kate escape with Simone and convince her to reveal Margot's last known whereabouts. The subsequent raid uncovers enough information to give Chloe access to the drone's camera. Meanwhile, CIA analyst Jordan Reed uncovers evidence that Kate's husband Adam Morgan may have been innocent all along. CIA Station Chief Steve Navarro arranges to have him assassinated in order to cover up his own involvement in selling intel to China and framing Morgan. The assassination does not go as planned and leads to the deaths of both Agent Reed and the hitman.

With Margot's deadline approaching, Heller decides to turn himself in and put an end to the civilian losses though he first pardons Jack for his crimes. Jack delivers Heller to Wembley Stadium where Margot's drone is waiting but convinces him to turn back when Chloe devises a plan to loop the video feed. Thinking that Heller is still inside, Margot and Ian fire on the stadium and then sink five of the six rogue drones. Upon learning that Heller is alive, Margot and Ian try to attack Waterloo station with the last drone. Jack arrives with a CIA tactical team before this can happen and kills both of them. Jack takes Yates' device back to the CIA to be analyzed. Upon arriving, he learns that Jordan's body has been found and identifies the second body as an assassin called James Harman, an ex-CIA Agent and ex-United States Navy SEAL, working for Navarro. Before Jack can apprehend him, Navarro escapes with the device and delivers it to Adrian Cross. Adrian explains to Chloe that some underground dealings with China are needed to finance their activism and takes her to an Open Cell chapter. They find that all of their colleagues have been murdered by ex-Chinese official turned terrorist Cheng Zhi, who wants to reprogram the override to start a war between the United States and China. Cheng kills Adrian, kidnaps Chloe and fabricates a torpedo launch order for an American submarine that sinks a Chinese aircraft carrier.

Russian Deputy Foreign Minister Anatol Stolnavich contacts Boudreau about the rendition order. When Boudreau tries to withdraw it, Stolnavich threatens to reveal that the signature has been forged. Boudreau co-operates and gives him access to a frequency used by Bauer. As a result, Jack is attacked by Russian agents working for Stolnavich on his way to retrieve the override and Cheng has time to escape. Upon discovering that his encrypted frequency was given to the Russians from within the White House, Bauer confronts Boudreau and tells him that Russia will benefit if the United States and China go to war. Heller immediately arrests Boudreau for treason but then delays custody, allowing Boudreau to assist Jack in the raid of a Russian diplomatic compound in which Stolnavich resides. He distracts Stolnavich long enough for Jack and Kate to break in but Stolnavich dies in the ensuing struggle. Audrey meets with a contact of hers, the daughter of a high-ranking Chinese official, hoping to convince her that the naval attacks were perpetrated by Cheng and not the American government. Even though Cheng is unable to stop Chloe from escaping, he uses a sniper and has Audrey's Secret Service detail killed. He contacts Bauer saying that Audrey will die unless he gets safe passage out of England.

From the files in Stolnavich's compound Jack finds out how Cheng is planning to escape and sends Kate to rescue Audrey without attracting attention. Chloe re-establishes contact with Jack and sets up satellite surveillance of the freighter that Cheng has boarded. While Jack and Belcheck raid the ship, Kate eliminates the sniper and tells them that Audrey is safe. However, a second shooter in the area fires several shots and Audrey dies in Kate's arms. Devastated by her loss, Jack kills all of Cheng's bodyguards and transmits proof of Cheng's whereabouts to President Heller and President Wei, the President of China. He kills Cheng immediately after the authenticity is verified. As the military advances are called off, Heller is told that his daughter is dead and Jack and Belcheck see that Chloe has gone missing again. Jack receives a phone call from the Russians demanding that he turn himself in to them.

Twelve hours later (only the second time-skip in the series' history), Kate resigns from the CIA out of regret and Mark awaits trial for committing treason in his attempt to save Audrey. Heller is left to mourn his daughter as his memories start to fade away, and Jack reluctantly gives himself up to Russian agents in exchange for Chloe's freedom despite being pardoned by Heller.

== Characters ==
24: Live Another Day main cast: (from left to right) Michael Wincott, Mary Lynn Rajskub, Giles Matthey, Benjamin Bratt, Yvonne Strahovski, Gbenga Akinnagbe, Kiefer Sutherland, William Devane, Kim Raver, and Tate Donovan

=== Starring ===
- Kiefer Sutherland as Jack Bauer (12 episodes)
- Yvonne Strahovski as Kate Morgan (12 episodes)
- Tate Donovan as Mark Boudreau (12 episodes)
- Mary Lynn Rajskub as Chloe O'Brian (12 episodes)
- William Devane as President James Heller (12 episodes)
- Gbenga Akinnagbe as Erik Ritter (11 episodes)
- Giles Matthey as Jordan Reed (9 episodes)
- Michael Wincott as Adrian Cross (10 episodes)
- Benjamin Bratt as Steve Navarro (10 episodes)
- Kim Raver as Audrey Boudreau (12 episodes)

=== Guest starring ===
- Ross McCall as Ron Clark (9 episodes)
- Branko Tomović as Belcheck (9 episodes)
- Michelle Fairley as Margot Al-Harazi (8 episodes)
- Stephen Fry as British Prime Minister Alastair Davies (8 episodes)
- Emily Berrington as Simone Al-Harazi (7 episodes)
- Mandeep Dhillon as Chell (7 episodes)
- Liam Garrigan as Ian Al-Harazi (7 episodes)
- James Allenby-Kirk as Stosh (7 episodes)
- Colin Salmon as General Coburn (7 episodes)
- Charles Furness as Pete (6 episodes)
- Miranda Raison as Caroline Fowlds (6 episodes)
- Adam Sinclair as Gavin Leonard (6 episodes)
- Stanley Townsend as Anatol Stolnavich (5 episodes)
- John Boyega as First Lieutenant Chris Tanner (4 episodes)
- Sacha Dhawan as Naveed Shabazz (4 episodes)
- Alex Lanipekun as James Harman (3 episodes)
- Tzi Ma as Cheng Zhi (3 episodes)
- Joseph Millson as Derrick Yates (3 episodes)
- Duncan Pow as Captain Greg Denovo (3 episodes)
- Philip Winchester as Colonel Shaw (3 episodes)
- Tamer Hassan as Aron Bashir/Basher (2 episodes)
- Alec Newman as Kevin Cordero (2 episodes)
- David Avery as Donny (2 episodes)
- Christina Chong as Mariana (5 episodes)
- James Puddephatt as Ken (2 episodes)
- David Yip as Chinese President Wei (2 episodes)

== Production ==
In May 2013, Deadline Hollywood first reported that Fox was considering a limited-run "event series" for 24 based on a concept by Howard Gordon, after failed efforts to produce the 24 feature film and the cancellation of Kiefer Sutherland's series Touch. David Fury confirmed on Twitter that he would also be involved, pulling "double duty" with Gordon's new series Tyrant. The following week, Fox officially announced 24: Live Another Day, a limited-run series of twelve episodes that would feature the return of Jack Bauer. Fox CEO Kevin Reilly said that the series would essentially represent the twelve "most important" hours of a typical 24 season, with jumps forward between hours as needed. As with the rest of Fox's push into event programming, the production will have "a big scope and top talent and top marketing budgets."

In the press release, Gordon said:

Jack Bauer has always been an exciting, thrilling character, and I confess that I've missed him. I think the audience has too. The character has evolved through the years, and this new and exciting event series format is perfect to tell the next chapter of his story and continue to reflect how the world is changing. Fans can rest assured that the Jack they know and love will be back.

Kiefer Sutherland, who was confirmed to executive produce and star in the new series, added:

The response to 24 is unlike anything I have ever experienced as an actor before. To have the chance to reunite with the character, Jack Bauer, is like finding a lost friend. The story ideas from Howard Gordon are exciting and fresh, and will not disappoint. Great thanks to 20th Century Fox Television, Imagine Television and the FOX network for this opportunity. Make no mistake, my goal is to knock your socks off. See you soon.

In June 2013, it was announced that former 24 director Jon Cassar was signed on as executive producer and director of Live Another Day, directing six of the twelve episodes. The remaining six episodes were given to former 24 director and producer Milan Cheylov, and new 24 directors, Adam Kane and Omar Madha. Executive producers and writers Robert Cochran, Manny Coto and Evan Katz were also announced to return. Sean Callery returned as the music composer for the series.

The writing process began on July 1, 2013, with David Fury pitching the first episode, which was tentatively titled "6:30–7:30". On July 11, 2013, executive producer Brian Grazer announced in an interview that the 24 miniseries would "be a limited series that would then spin off into a series itself. Fox is doing it, Fox studio and Fox network, and we're totally thrilled by that." In October 2013, it was confirmed the series would be set and filmed in London, England, United Kingdom. Pre-production and location scouting by the crew, including Jon Cassar, began in November 2013. The production offices for Live Another Day were based in the Gillette Building in west London, previously used for Red 2. Production began on January 6, 2014.

In a May 2014 press release, Fox billed the eighth episode as the franchise's 200th episode.

=== Trailer ===
A promotional video was shot on January 22, 2014, with filming beginning for the series on January 26. The first teaser for the show aired on Sky1 on January 21, 2014, but did not show any new footage. The first American trailer, titled "Street Chaos", followed four 10-second teasers during Super Bowl XLVIII on February 2, 2014, but didn't show any footage from the series. Also, a promotional image was sent to Entertainment Weekly on February 20, 2014.

In March, another promo with actual footage was released, showing the President of the United States arriving in London; Bauer being spotted there on camera by the CIA; and him telling Chloe that "there's no going home" for him. A 20-minute preview of Live Another Day was released by Fox on April 7 and broadcast on May 3.

=== Casting ===
Kiefer Sutherland was immediately cast as Jack Bauer on May 13, 2013. Mary Lynn Rajskub was announced as the second official cast member in August 2013, reprising her role as Chloe O'Brian. In October 2013, it was confirmed that Kim Raver and William Devane would reprise their roles as Audrey Raines and James Heller, respectively.

The first new character to be cast was Michael Wincott's hacker character Adrian Cross. One month later, two more characters were added to the cast: CIA agents Erik Ritter and Jordan Reed played by Gbenga Akinnagbe and Giles Matthey, respectively. On December 19, 2013, it was announced that three-time Primetime Emmy Award winner Judy Davis had joined the cast as the villain Margot Al-Harazi. However, Davis later exited the role for "personal family matters"; the role was recast with Michelle Fairley. On January 13, at a TCA panel discussing the show, it was announced that Yvonne Strahovski would play CIA agent Kate Morgan. Benjamin Bratt was cast as her boss Steve Navarro.

On January 21, Tate Donovan was cast as Heller's Chief of Staff and the husband of Audrey Raines, Mark Boudreau. On January 24, Stephen Fry was cast as the British Prime Minister Trevor Davies, later renamed Alastair Davies. On the same day, relatively unknown actor Charles Furness was cast in a "small guest part" as Peter, a member of Chloe's hacker group. On January 26, Ross McCall was revealed to have acted in Live Another Day by Jon Cassar playing Ron Clark, assistant of Mark Boudreau. The next day, John Boyega was announced to be playing drone pilot Chris Tanner. Among the last actors to have his role announced was Colin Salmon playing U.S. General Coburn.

=== 24: Solitary ===
Solitary is a story extension included in the Live Another Day Blu-ray set which was released on September 30, 2014. It takes place approximately three years after the events of Live Another Day and features the return of Carlos Bernard as Tony Almeida as he attempts to be released from solitary confinement. In Solitary, Tony requests to be moved from solitary confinement to general population, in an interview with a Department of Justice attorney and the prison administrator. Tony explains that he could supply inside information to the government regarding other criminals, such as Mexican cartels and al-Qaeda. When the request is denied, and a guard uncuffs him, he attacks the attorney, throwing her to the ground. During the attack, Tony is able to take her glasses without anyone noticing. Later, the attorney calls a man to confirm that Tony has the plans. Back in his cell, Tony puts on the glasses, which reveal they have escape plans in the lenses.

== Episodes ==
No. overall	No. in season	Title	Directed by	Written by	Original release date	Prod. code	US viewers (millions)
193	1	"Day 9: 11:00 a.m. – 12:00 p.m."	Jon Cassar	Evan Katz & Manny Coto	May 5, 2014	9AFF01	8.08
Four years after the events of Day 8 in New York City, the CIA captures federal fugitive and ex-Counter Terrorist Unit Agent Jack Bauer in London, where President James Heller is preparing to sign a military treaty with the British Prime Minister for using drones. Agent Kate Morgan, who is preparing to leave after her resignation because of the prosecution of her husband Adam for the alleged selling of classified information to the Chinese, suspects Jack's capture and starts investigating it. CIA Station Chief Steve Navarro starts questioning Jack, who does not talk at all. Ex-CTU Data Analyst Chloe O'Brian is shown to be in CIA custody, being interrogated by Agent Dean of the CIA’s Special Activities Division with truth serum. Kate finds out that Jack intended to be captured and deduces that he is there for O'Brian. Jack's friend Belcheck, an ex-Serbian Mob enforcer, cuts the power to the CIA station and blows a hole through the street above Jack's location, giving Jack the chance to free himself and O'Brian. The duo escapes in Belcheck's car and Jack later lets her go, intending to follow her to her destination. First Lieutenant Tanner takes control of a drone, which is in Afghanistan supporting British soldiers. The drone is hacked by a man who kills the soldiers with it. Meanwhile, Chief of Staff Mark Boudreau, the husband of Audrey who has recovered from her psychosis, decides to keep the news about Jack's capture away from both Audrey and Heller.
194	2	"Day 9: 12:00 p.m. – 1:00 p.m."	Jon Cassar	Robert Cochran & David Fury	May 5, 2014	9AFF02	8.08
Navarro allows Kate to lead the search for Jack and O'Brian. Jack and Belcheck follow Chloe, and arrive at the hideout of Open Cell, a hacktivist group led by Adrian Cross. The two men storm in and it is revealed that Derrick Yates, one of the Open Cell members, possesses an override device capable of hacking several military firewalls. Cross reveals that he made the override, but Yates stole it and left the group. Jack forces them to find Yates' location, where Jack heads with O'Brian. Yates gets a call from the woman he is intending to sell the override to, arranging the location. He and his girlfriend leave their safehouse, which is owned by a drug dealer named Aron Bashir. Jack infiltrates Bashir's building while Kate and other agents also arrive. A shootout starts, and Yates and his girlfriend manage to escape and go to a bar, where she kills him and takes the override. She calls the buyer, who is revealed to be her mother. Meanwhile, Tanner's claim that his drone was hacked is not believed and he is arrested. Heller decides to give a statement to Parliament. He begins practising because of his senile dementia.
195	3	"Day 9: 1:00 p.m. – 2:00 p.m."	Adam Kane	Sang Kyu Kim & Patrick Somerville	May 12, 2014	9AFF03	6.48
Jack and Chloe start chasing the girl. They identify her as Simone Al-Harazi, daughter of Margot, a known terrorist who lost her husband during a drone strike authorized by Heller. As Jack chases Simone on foot, Chloe loses her as a result of being distracted by witnessing three people reminding her of Morris and their child, both of whom died in a car crash, which she believes was actually intended for her. Simone escapes, and Jack deduces that they can find a clue in Tanner's flight key. Kate forces Bashir to talk. Jack arrives at the American Embassy, where Tanner is brought. Cross secretly manipulates the hack intended to give Jack a fake ID for entering the embassy. Jack escapes and shoots two of the protestors outside, inciting an assault by them inside the embassy, giving Jack the chance to infiltrate while Kate and agent Ritter also arrive. Meanwhile, Mark secretly arranges to surrender Jack to the Russians and fakes Heller's signature for approval. Simone's husband, Naveed Shabaaz, believes Margot's plan for terrorist strikes to be wrong. Heller arrives at Parliament, but the MPs begin a protest against his speech.
196	4	"Day 9: 2:00 p.m. – 3:00 p.m."	Adam Kane	Patrick Harbinson	May 19, 2014	9AFF04	5.72
As Heller manages to gain the approval of the MPs, Jack reaches Tanner and gets his flight key. He escapes to a room and locks the door, taking the staff hostage and threatening to kill them if the guards make any attempt. Jack starts sending the data of the key to O'Brian. Mark is forced to tell Heller and Audrey about the situation. Heller calls Jack, who explains his belief that the drone fleet is not safe with the override outside, which Heller does not believe; he orders the guards to arrest Jack. Mark secretly tells one of the guards to kill Jack. Believing him, Kate infiltrates the room and convinces him to let her help. The guards storm in before the data transfer is complete; and she manages to end the crisis without Jack's death. Meanwhile, Margot forces Shabaaz to pilot the hacked drones by torturing Simone and mutilating one of her fingers.
197	5	"Day 9: 3:00 p.m. – 4:00 p.m."	Omar Madha	Sang Kyu Kim & Patrick Somerville	May 26, 2014	9AFF05	5.71
Kate sends the data on the flight key to O'Brian, who manages to find evidence that proves that Tanner's drone was hijacked and also the existence of the override. Heller orders all U.S. drones to be grounded, but Margot has already managed to take control of a group of drones heading towards the UK. Jack is brought to Heller, to whom he reveals knowing an associate of Margot's who can be used to get to her. However, Jack does not reveal their identity, believing himself to be the only person capable of establishing contact. Shabaaz tells Simone that he has planted evidence in a room and he has made the drone hijack traceable. The trace is found by the CIA, and Navarro leads a team to the location. Cross decides to evacuate the hideout and tries to force O'Brian to leave with him, but Belcheck stops him. Having found out about Shabaaz's betrayal, Margot has him taken away and reveals that her son, Ian, has sent a false trace to the CIA. O'Brian alerts Kate about the trap. Margot kills Shabaaz, and Simone does not challenge it.
198	6	"Day 9: 4:00 p.m. – 5:00 p.m."	Omar Madha	David Fury	June 2, 2014	9AFF06	6.18
Jack is asked about his lead, and he decides to follow it with Kate's help, as she has proven her capabilities to him. She reveals that Adam committed suicide in prison. Jack tells Kate the name of Margot's associate is Karl Rask, a weapons dealer who knows him. The duo heads to Rask's hideout with a scenario of Jack having captured Kate. Rask orders his men to torture her for information. Meanwhile, Jack proves his innocence with O'Brian's help. O'Brian uploads a virus to Rask's computer that starts checking his logs. It finds Simone's phone number, which Chloe starts tracing. However, MI5 agents storm into the hideout on the Prime Minister's order, as he believes Heller's decisions to be ineffective. Rask commits suicide. Meanwhile, Margot tasks Simone to kill Shabaaz's sister and her daughter. Simone kills the sister, but her daughter escapes; Simone gives chase but gets hit by a bus in the street. In the meantime, agent Reed tells Navarro that he has found leads proving Adam's innocence and another agent's involvement. Navarro secretly calls a man and reports it, revealed to be the true seller of the intel.
199	7	"Day 9: 5:00 p.m. – 6:00 p.m."	Jon Cassar	Tony Basgallop	June 9, 2014	9AFF07	6.28
In a broadcast, Margot demands Heller, threatening to attack British cities by the drones. Jack and Kate arrive at the hospital keeping Simone, and he starts questioning her. An operative of Margot's attacks them. They get in a car before a drone piloted by Ian destroys the hospital, and escape, evading the drone, which tries to destroy the car. However, the trio manage to lose it. Jack tells Heller that Simone needs medical care to be able to talk. Heller tasks him to meet him. Heller secretly calls Margot and announces his decision to surrender. Meanwhile, Navarro calls his associate, who is revealed to be Cross, who tasks him to deal quickly with Reed. Navarro sends Reed to a location to run an errand, but Reed is shot by a mercenary and falls into water. Mark secretly meets Russian Deputy Foreign Minister Anatol Stolnavich, who states that the former's faking of a Presidential signature is an act of treason, and that he will reveal it unless the former surrenders Jack as promised. Mark convinces him to give him time until Jack ends the crisis.
200	8	"Day 9: 6:00 p.m. – 7:00 p.m."	Jon Cassar	Robert Cochran	June 16, 2014	9AFF08	5.63
Jack arrives at Heller's residence, where Heller enlists his help in sneaking out and going to Wembley Stadium, the location arranged by Margot. Heller also persuades Mark to help him and not tell Audrey. Jack removes Heller's radar tracker and the two head for the stadium. Heller enters the field, and Margot shoots a missile from one of the drones to the location where Heller is standing in the video, apparently killing him. Meanwhile, Simone regains consciousness and gives a location to Kate, saying that Margot is no longer there but telling her where Shabaaz's case is hidden. In the meantime, Reed, who has survived, escapes to a nearby location. He calls and informs Navarro, who gives the location to the mercenary. Reed attacks him and, revealing he knows about Navarro, asks the mercenary about Navarro's motive. They engage in a duel and kill each other.
201	9	"Day 9: 7:00 p.m. – 8:00 p.m."	Milan Cheylov	Teleplay by : Tony Basgallop & Sang Kyu Kim; Story by : Evan Katz & Manny Coto	June 23, 2014	9AFF09	5.71
Margot starts destroying her drones as promised. However, Ian finds out that Heller left the field before the shooting and is alive. Margot decides to use the remaining drone to strike London. CIA finds Shabaaz's case, and with the help of O'Brian manages to find Margot's location. Jack heads there and kills Ian before stopping the strike, then he kills Margot. Knowing that the CIA will find out about him soon, Navarro asks Cross for help. Cross agrees to help him leave the country in exchange for delivering the override, which Jack brings to the CIA for analysis. The bodies of Reed and the mercenary are found, and Jack tasks a skilled technician to identify the mercenary and his affiliations. Navarro steals the override and escapes the CIA, successfully evading Jack. With her mission accomplished, O'Brian reunites with Cross who arranges a location for Navarro.
202	10	"Day 9: 8:00 p.m. – 9:00 p.m."	Milan Cheylov	Teleplay by : Adam DaSilva; Story by : Robert Cochran & Manny Coto & Evan Katz	June 30, 2014	9AFF10	5.72
The CIA manages to capture Navarro, but does not find the override, which he has given to Cross. Navarro states that he has planted a tracker on the override and will trade the code in exchange for immunity, which makes Kate angry. She and Jack formulate a plan and lure Navarro into revealing the code. Jack and Kate head to the location, but are intercepted by Russian operatives working for Stolnavich, who obtained the information from Mark by blackmailing him. Meanwhile, O'Brian finds out about Cross's actions and tries to escape, but he stops her. They head to a location where they are intercepted by Cheng Zhi, who was delivered to the Chinese government after Day 6 and escaped incarceration during a riot, in which he was believed to have died. He and his operatives force O'Brian to activate the override. Cheng uses it to order an American submarine to destroy a Chinese ship, which could start a war. Cross reveals to O'Brian that her family's death was actually an accident, but he'd kept it hidden in order to keep her at Open Cell. Cheng kills Cross.
203	11	"Day 9: 9:00 p.m. – 10:00 p.m."	Jon Cassar	Robert Cochran & David Fury	July 7, 2014	9AFF11	5.96
As the Chinese President orders a strike against the U.S., Cheng abducts O'Brian. Jack and Morgan defeat the Russians with the help of CIA backup and arrive at the location, finding an audio recorded by O'Brian, revealing to Jack that Cheng is alive and also behind the attack. Mark reveals to Heller and Jack that he gave the information to Stolnavich. They deduce that Stolnavich and Cheng are working together to start a war between China and the U.S., which will bring benefit to Russia and fulfill Cheng's vendetta against China. Jack devises a plan to use Mark to get to Stolnavich. Mark goes to Stolnavich's residence and claims that he is requesting asylum. However, Stolnavich finds the truth and turns on Mark, who accidentally kills him. Meanwhile, Audrey meets a friend of hers at the Chinese Embassy hoping to delay the Chinese strike until Jack can find Cheng, who has Audrey's friend and bodyguards killed and takes her hostage.
204	12	"Day 9: 10:00 p.m. – 11:00 a.m."	Jon Cassar	Manny Coto & Evan Katz	July 14, 2014	9AFF12	6.47
Cheng sends live footage of Audrey to Jack, demanding he stop tracking him until he can leave and then free her. Jack tasks Morgan to save Audrey while he can find and stop Cheng. Using information from Stolnavich's compound, they locate him at a dock, and Jack heads there with Belcheck and O'Brian, who provides satellite support for the other two. Meanwhile, Morgan manages to kill the sniper watching Audrey and saves her. However, Audrey is killed by a backup gunman. Jack and Belcheck manage to infiltrate the ship and find Cheng, whom Jack forces to confess in a video then played to the Chinese president, who aborts the strike, but demands compensation from Heller, who agrees. Jack beheads Cheng. He returns and finds O'Brian gone. He gets a call from the kidnappers and arranges the location and time. Twelve hours later, Jack gives himself up to Russian operatives, who free O'Brian in exchange for him. Mark is put in custody. Morgan and Heller decide to resign.

== Reception ==
24: Live Another Day received positive reviews from critics. On review aggregator site Rotten Tomatoes the series has an approval rating of 82% based on 55 reviews, with an average rating of 7.3/10. The site's critical consensus reads, "Filled with strong action sequences, 24: Live Another Day is a return to the formula that made the original series popular – though it also suffers from familiarity and sameness." On Metacritic the series has a score of 70 out of 100, based on 40 critics, indicating "generally favorable" reviews.

The season's finale was met with critical acclaim, with reviewers praising the performances by Kiefer Sutherland and William Devane, the mix of fast action and emotionally wrenching content and the skilled use of emphatic silences.

The series was nominated for Best Stunt Team at the 21st Screen Actors Guild Awards and for Best Limited Series and Best Actor at the 5th Critics' Choice Television Awards. It also received three nominations for the 67th Primetime Emmy Awards.

=== Ratings ===
Viewership and ratings per episode of 24: Live Another Day
No.	Title	Air date	Rating/share (18–49)	Viewers (millions)
1	"Day 9: 11:00 a.m. – 12:00 p.m."	May 5, 2014	2.6/8	8.08
2	"Day 9: 12:00 p.m. – 1:00 p.m."	May 5, 2014	2.6/8	8.08
3	"Day 9: 1:00 p.m. – 2:00 p.m."	May 12, 2014	2.0/6	6.48
4	"Day 9: 2:00 p.m. – 3:00 p.m."	May 19, 2014	1.7/5	5.72
5	"Day 9: 3:00 p.m. – 4:00 p.m."	May 26, 2014	1.5/4	5.71
6	"Day 9: 4:00 p.m. – 5:00 p.m."	June 2, 2014	1.8/6	6.18
7	"Day 9: 5:00 p.m. – 6:00 p.m."	June 9, 2014	1.6/5	6.28
8	"Day 9: 6:00 p.m. – 7:00 p.m."	June 16, 2014	1.4/4	5.63
9	"Day 9: 7:00 p.m. – 8:00 p.m."	June 23, 2014	1.4/4	5.71
10	"Day 9: 8:00 p.m. – 9:00 p.m."	June 30, 2014	1.4/4	5.72
11	"Day 9: 9:00 p.m. – 10:00 p.m."	July 7, 2014	1.4/4	5.96
12	"Day 9: 10:00 p.m. – 11:00 a.m."	July 14, 2014	1.7/5	6.47

=== Award nominations ===
Organization	Category	Nominee(s)	Result
Primetime Emmy Awards	Outstanding Music Composition for a Limited Series, Movie or Special	Sean Callery	Nominated
Primetime Emmy Awards	Outstanding Sound Editing for a Limited Series, Movie or Special	Pembrooke Andrews, Jeffrey R. Whitcher, Robert W. Guastini, Jeff Charbonneau, Shawn Kennelly, Melissa Kennelly, Vincent Nicastro	Nominated
Primetime Emmy Awards	Outstanding Single-Camera Picture Editing For a Limited Series or Movie	Scott Powell	Nominated
Screen Actors Guild Awards	Outstanding Performance by a Stunt Ensemble in a Television Series	Mark Mottran, Daniel Dow	Nominated
Critics' Choice Television Awards	Best Limited Series		Nominated
Critics' Choice Television Awards	Best Actor in a Movie or Limited Series	Kiefer Sutherland	Nominated

== Home media releases ==
24: Live Another Day was released on DVD and Blu-ray in region 1 on September 30, 2014 and in region 2 on October 6, 2014.

== See also ==
- List of fictional prime ministers of the United Kingdom
