= JAG season 1 =

JAG
- Season 1
- Starring: David James Elliott; Tracey Needham; Andrea Parker
- No. of episodes: 22

Release
- Original network: NBC (episodes 1–21); USA Network (episode 22)
- Original release: September 23, 1995 – July 8, 1996

Season chronology
- Next → Season 2 (on CBS)

The first season of JAG premiered on NBC on September 23, 1995, and concluded on July 8, 1996. The season, initially starring David James Elliott and Tracey Needham, was produced by Belisarius Productions in association with NBC Productions and Paramount Television.

== Premise ==
Lieutenant Harmon "Harm" Rabb Jr. (David James Elliott), a former naval aviator turned lawyer, is employed by the Navy's Judge Advocate General's Corps, the internal law firm of the Department of the Navy. In Washington, D.C., Harm is partnered with Lieutenant Junior Grade Meg Austin (Tracey Needham), a junior officer with drive and determination. Together, Harm and Meg work alongside Commander Alison Krennick (Andrea Thompson), Rear Admiral A.J. Chegwidden (John M. Jackson), and Lieutenant Caitlin Pike (Andrea Parker), as they prosecute and defend the under the Uniform Code of Military Justice (UCMJ). This season, the team investigate the murder of a female naval flight officer ("A New Life"), the death of a civilian contractor ("Shadow"), a training mishap ("Desert Son"), a murder at Arlington National Cemetery with connections to Thai diplomats ("Déjà Vu"), and a murder at the U.S. Embassy in Peru ("War Cries"). Also this season, Harm suffers personal losses when his best friend ("Pilot Error") and girlfriend ("Skeleton Crew") are both killed, Meg faces death when she is critically wounded by a professional assassin ("Hemlock"), and Harm is promoted to the grade of Lieutenant Commander ("Defensive Action").

== Production ==
Production of the first season of JAG was based at Sunset Gower Studios, right in the heart of Hollywood.

In Spring 1996, NBC announced that they were not commissioning Paramount Television to make a second season of JAG. Creator and Executive producer Donald P. Bellisario states that he had already received offers from CBS and ABC to pick up the series. Bellisario also credits the cancellation with allowing him to create "the show he'd always wanted to make", as NBC had "wanted action, and [he had] wanted a mix of legal [drama] and action".

"Dramatic, action adventure programming has all but disappeared from the airwaves. I don't do sitcoms; I don't do urban neurotic dramas. I created JAG because it's the kind of television I like to watch. Besides that, I served four years in the Marine Corps and remain fascinated by the military's code of ethics—God, duty, honor, country—and how, in these rapidly changing times, it still survives. That's what Harm and Mac, and JAG as a whole, represent."

— Donald P. Bellisario (on creating JAG), Paramount website

== Cast and characters ==
=== Main ===
- David James Elliott as Harmon Rabb Jr., Lieutenant Commander
- Andrea Parker as Caitlin Pike, Lieutenant (pilot only; recurring, thereafter)
- Tracey Needham as Meg Austin, Lieutenant J.G. (from episode 1.3)

=== Recurring ===
- John M. Jackson as A. J. Chegwidden, Rear Admiral
- Patrick Labyorteaux as Bud Roberts, Ensign
- Andrea Thompson as Allison Krennick, Commander
- W.K. Stratton as Theodore Lindsey, Commander
- Terry O'Quinn as Thomas Boone, Captain, "CAG"

=== Guest appearances ===
- Kevin Dunn as Rear Admiral Albert Brovo
- Julie Caitlin Brown as Staff Sergeant Carrington
- Jenny Gago as Sergeant Gonzalez
- Sam Jenkins as Private Whitley
- Oliver North as Uncle Ollie
- Rex Linn as Submarine Skipper
- Ryan Hurst as Dirk Grover
- Spencer Garrett as First Lieutenant Vince Boone
- Neal McDonough as First Lieutenant Jay Williams
- Walton Goggins as Communications Officer
- Michael Paul Chan as Ambassador Sonsiri
- Vivian Wu as Angelique Sonsiri
- Ron Livingston as Corporal David Anderson
- Madeline Zima as Kathy Gold
- Catherine Bell as Lieutenant J.G. Diane Schonke

== Episodes ==
No. overall	No. in season	Title	Directed by	Written by	Original release date	Prod. code	US viewers (millions)
1	1	"A New Life"	Donald P. Bellisario	Donald P. Bellisario	September 23, 1995	0101	16.0
2	2	"A New Life"	Donald P. Bellisario	Donald P. Bellisario	September 23, 1995	0102	16.0
When a female F-14 Tomcat RIO (Radar Intercept Officer) goes missing from the aircraft carrier U.S.S. Seahawk while stationed in the Adriatic Sea, the Judge Advocate General of the Navy, Rear Admiral Al Brovo (Kevin Dunn), sends young Lieutenant Harmon Rabb with Lieutenant Junior Grade Caitlin Pike on Bastille Day 1995 out to the carrier where they must find out whether her death was accidental or intentional. (Note: Many of the F-14 Tomcat and aircraft carrier exterior shots include scenes from Top Gun, Flight of the Intruder and The Final Countdown.)
3	3	"Shadow"	Donald P. Bellisario	Donald P. Bellisario	September 30, 1995	0103	11.0
Following the reassignment of Caitlin Pike, Harm is partnered with Meg Austin, a Lieutenant junior grade (LTJG) with a phobia of enclosed spaces. Their first case together is aboard a Los Angeles-class submarine, where a civilian contractor gone rogue has hijacked the systems of the submarine with his laptop, and threatens to sink a civilian cruise ship with an experimental torpedo if ransom is not paid. Together, Harm and Meg must try and trick the computer expert into deactivating the torpedo himself. (Note: Some of the submarine external shots and maneuvers are taken from the film The Hunt for Red October.)
4	4	"Desert Son"	Joe Napolitano	Story by : Robert Crais; Teleplay by : Robert Crais & Evan Katz & Donald P. Bellisario	October 7, 1995	0104	11.1
Harm and Meg are called to investigate when a junior officer and son of retired General Thomas Williams (Charles Hallahan), a former Commandant of the United States Marine Corps is accused of negligence that left several Marines injured during a field artillery training exercise. The case becomes more complex when the son confesses, but Harm doubts his guilt.
5	5	"Déjà Vu"	Doug Lefler	Evan Katz	October 21, 1995	0105	9.9
After the body of a naval officer is found at Arlington National Cemetery following a reception at the Thai Embassy, Harm and Meg are called to investigate. Meanwhile, a new acquaintance prompts Harm to reminisce about a female friend in Southeast Asia, who was murdered by her country's military.
6	6	"Pilot Error"	Les Landau	Story by : Jack Orman; Teleplay by : Jack Orman & Robert Cochran & Donald P. Bellisario	November 4, 1995	0106	10.3
When one of Harm's classmates from Annapolis is killed testing a new type of auto-navigation system on an F-14 Tomcat, Harm and Meg must determine whether the accident was due to pilot error or a mechanical failure. (Note: The USS America landing scenes feature reused footage from Top Gun.)
7	7	"War Cries"	Duwayne Dunham	R. Scott Gemmill	November 11, 1995	0107	10.8
A Peruvian boy is killed inside the U.S. Embassy in Lima, and Harm and Meg must determine his intent before the country explodes in anger. (Note: Part of the scenes for the assault on the convoy were taken from the 1994 movie Clear and Present Danger.)
8	8	"Brig Break"	Jim Johnston	Story by : Robert Cochran; Teleplay by : Reuben Leder & Robert Cochran	December 2, 1995	0108	10.4
Meg is taken hostage during a "brig break" from the SEATAC Naval Base in Washington state, but Harm and Kate suspect that it is merely a decoy for something more serious than just a prison break at a base which houses nuclear weapons.
9	9	"Scimitar"	John McPherson	Robert Cochran	December 9, 1995	0109	9.1
A US Marine Corps Humvee on patrol along the Iraq-Kuwait border accidentally crosses into Iraqi territory, and Harm and Meg are sent to defend the sole surviving crew member in an Iraqi court. Harm is also given a secondary task – help the Marine escape regardless of the outcome of the trial.
10	10	"Boot"	Jim Johnston	Lucian K. Truscott IV	January 6, 1996	0110	11.9
Meg goes undercover as a boot camp recruit at Parris Island after a Marine recruit is found dead and suspicion falls on the drill instructors. (Note: This episode was supposed to be aired after "Defensive Action" (since Harm already got his promotion, and that case is referenced in the beginning).)
11	11	"Sightings"	Tom Del Ruth	Evan Katz	January 13, 1996	0111	10.1
A little girl goes missing and Harm and Meg go looking for her around a closed naval airfield in Texas where several "UFO sightings" have been reported.
12	12	"The Brotherhood"	Michael Zinberg	R. Scott Gemmill & Donald P. Bellisario	February 3, 1996	0112	10.4
When a Marine is found unconscious on a beach, Harm and Meg get drawn into a "turf war" between Marines at Camp Pendleton and a prominent Los Angeles street gang.
13	13	"Defensive Action"	Ray Austin	Terry Curtis Fox	March 13, 1996	0113	12.1
Newly promoted Lieutenant Commander Harmon Rabb defends Captain Thomas Boone, the "CAG" (Terry O'Quinn) who is accused of shooting down a Serbian helicopter, contrary to the rules of engagement.
14	14	"Smoked"	Jim Johnston	Donald P. Bellisario	March 20, 1996	0114	12.6
A lightning-damaged F-14 Tomcat makes an emergency landing in Cuba, so Harm and Meg are sent there to try to "talk" it back before the Cubans have a chance to download the avionics and sell them to Iran (the only user of the F-14 other than the United States). There is a new JAG, Rear Admiral A. J. Chegwidden, with a background as a highly decorated Navy SEAL.
15	15	"Hemlock"	Jim Johnston	Story by : Robert Cochran & Jack Orman and Donald P. Bellisario; Teleplay by : Jack Orman & Donald P. Bellisario	March 27, 1996	0115	14.0
After having received a mysterious message on the fax machine, Meg is critically wounded by an assassin, posing as a commander in the British Royal Navy. The assassin’s real target is Russian president Boris Yeltsin who is secretly coming to the United States to sign a treaty. Oliver North makes a guest appearance as Meg's Uncle Ollie.
16	16	"High Ground"	Ray Austin	Robert L. McCullough & Greg Strangis	April 3, 1996	0116	12.3
A soon to be retired top Marine sniper refuses to be deployed to Bosnia and goes AWOL after being accused of trying to kill his CO.
17	17	"Black Ops"	Ray Austin	Story by : Greg Strangis & Peter Lance & Robert McCullough; Teleplay by : Greg Strangis & Robert L. McCullough	April 10, 1996	0117	12.9
A pilot and son of a female U.S. Senator attached to a team of SEALs dies, apparently due to negligence on the part of the SEALs. The Senator initially wants to put the blame on the SEALs, but Admiral Chegwidden and Harm find that the real cause of the pilot's death lies elsewhere.
18	18	"Survivors"	Greg Beeman	Story by : R. Scott Gemmill; Teleplay by : R. Scott Gemmill & Donald P. Bellisario & Jack Orman	April 17, 1996	0118	10.9
A Marine Colonel believes his son is the reincarnation of his KIA Vietnam War buddy, so he kidnaps the child amidst child custody court proceedings to fulfill an old promise.
19	19	"Recovery"	Joe Napolitano	Jack Orman	May 1, 1996	0119	11.3
An emergency procedures drill during a Space Shuttle "dry run" goes wrong when a cable breaks and an astronaut falls to his death. Harm and Meg have to determine if it was sabotage before the shuttle goes up.
20	20	"The Prisoner"	Michael Zinberg	Evan Katz	May 8, 1996	0120	9.4
While in Hong Kong (one year before the transfer of sovereignty from Britain), Harm is kidnapped by the Chinese and interrogated about anticipated American reaction should China try to take the Matsu Islands by force. While imprisoned, Harm believes the man in the cell next to him (voiced by Richard Crenna) is his missing father.
21	21	"Ares"	Ray Austin	Eric Hall & Jack Orman	May 22, 1996	0121	9.2
When the computerized Ares Combat System onboard the USS Daniel Boone, a U.S. Arleigh Burke-class destroyer suddenly malfunctions, Harm, Kate and Meg have to figure out how to keep the disabled destroyer from falling into North Korean hands.
22	22	"Skeleton Crew"	Donald P. Bellisario	Donald P. Bellisario	July 8, 1996 (Seven Network); December 5, 1999 (USA Network)	0122	N/A
Diane Schonke (Catherine Bell), whom Harm knew at the Naval Academy, turns up dead at Naval Station Norfolk The prime suspect also dies under mysterious circumstances, so Harm falls under suspicion of murder by NCIS agent Brian Turque (John Ashton). This episode includes the second appearance of Bud Roberts (Patrick Labyorteaux) as the Seahawk's Public Relations Officer. (Note: NBC did not air this episode (due to cutting the series from their lineup, and the basic storyline and most of the original shooting (including Andrea Thompson's parts) were later recycled in "Death Watch" (episode 3.19). This episode was aired overseas and later in the United States when aired by the USA Network at the point when the show went into syndication reruns.)

== See also ==
- 1995–96 United States network television schedule
