= 24 (TV series) =

American television series (2001–2010, 2014)

- Genre: Action; Drama; Crime; Political thriller; Spy thriller
- Created by: Joel Surnow; Robert Cochran
- Showrunners: Joel Surnow; Robert Cochran; Howard Gordon
- Starring: Kiefer Sutherland; (and others)
- Composer: Sean Callery
- Country of origin: United States
- Original language: English
- No. of seasons: 9
- No. of episodes: 204 + 24: Redemption (list of episodes)

Production
- Executive producers: Joel Surnow; Robert Cochran; Brian Grazer; Howard Gordon; Evan Katz; Kiefer Sutherland; Jon Cassar; Manny Coto; David Fury; Brad Turner; Brannon Braga; Alex Gansa; Chip Johannessen; Tony Krantz
- Production locations: Los Angeles (seasons 1–8); Cape Town (Redemption); Washington, D.C. (season 7); London (Live Another Day)
- Cinematography: Peter Levy; Rodney Charters; Jeffrey C. Mygatt; Guy Skinner
- Editors: David Latham; Scott Powell; Leon Ortiz-Gil; Chris Willingham; Casey O. Rohrs; Larry Davenport; Elisa Cohen; David Thompson
- Running time: 41–52 minutes
- Production companies: Imagine Television; Real Time Productions (seasons 1–7); Teakwood Lane Productions (seasons 7–9); 20th Century Fox Television

Original release
- Network: Fox
- Release: November 6, 2001 – May 24, 2010
- Release: May 5 – July 14, 2014

Related
- 24: Legacy

24 is an American counterterrorism thriller television series created by Joel Surnow and Robert Cochran for Fox. The series features an ensemble cast, with Kiefer Sutherland starring as American federal agent Jack Bauer. Each season covers 24 consecutive hours using the real time method of narration, which is emphasized by the display of split screens and a digital clock. Multiple ongoing plot lines of intersecting relevance are covered, with Bauer's plot line serving as the link throughout. The show premiered on November 6, 2001, and spanned 204 episodes over nine seasons, with the series finale broadcast on July 14, 2014. In addition, the television film 24: Redemption aired between seasons six and seven, on November 23, 2008. 24 is a joint production by Imagine Television and 20th Century Fox Television.

Bauer is portrayed as a highly proficient agent with an "ends justify the means" approach, willing to lie, threaten, or even harm anyone who refuses to cooperate with him. Throughout the series, the plot elements contain both a political thriller and serial drama, with each episode typically ending on a cliffhanger. Bauer uses people on both sides of the law in his attempts to prevent terrorist attacks and bring down those responsible, sometimes at great personal expense. These attacks include presidential assassination attempts, bomb detonations, bioterrorism and cyberwarfare, as well as conspiracies that involve government and corporate corruption.

24 received generally positive reviews, with the fifth season being universally praised by critics. However, the series also attracted significant criticism for its depictions of torture, as well as its negative portrayal of Muslims. The show won numerous awards throughout its run, including Best Drama Series at the 2004 Golden Globe Awards and Outstanding Drama Series at the 2006 Primetime Emmy Awards. In May 2013, it was announced that 24 would return with a 12-episode limited series titled 24: Live Another Day, which aired from May 5 to July 14, 2014, bringing the episode count to 204. A spin-off series, 24: Legacy, premiered on February 5, 2017, lasting a single 12-episode season. 24 is the longest-running American espionage or counterterrorism-themed television drama, surpassing both Mission: Impossible and Britain's The Avengers.

== Synopsis ==
=== Premise ===
24 is an action thriller starring Kiefer Sutherland as central character Jack Bauer, a Los Angeles-based senior agent initially assigned to the fictional "Counter Terrorist Unit" (CTU), whose mandate is to protect the United States from terrorist plots. The episodes take place over the course of one hour, depicting events as they happen, in real time. However, commercial breaks are normally used to skip several minutes multiple times, which means that about 17 minutes of each hour is not shown. To emphasize the real-world flow of events, a clock is prominently displayed on-screen at certain points during the show, and there is regular use of split screens, a technique used to depict multiple scenes occurring simultaneously.

In addition to Bauer, each episode typically follows other American government officials from CTU/FBI/CIA and the White House, as well as the conspirators who set the events in motion. Because many of these conspirators commit murder for political gain, several of Bauer's contacts are killed as a consequence of government intervention. The grief that Bauer experiences from these deaths is often explored throughout the series. While Bauer does have the utmost respect for most of his colleagues, friends and family members, he always believes himself to know how to provide the best way of saving innocent lives and/or achieving his own sense of justice, often being proven right when taking action.

24 is known for employing plot twists which may arise as antagonists adapt, objectives evolve or larger-scale operations unfold. Stories also involve interpersonal relationships, delving into the private lives of the characters. As part of a recurring theme, characters are frequently confronted with ethical dilemmas. Examples of this are a bombing in season 2, which can only be prevented by blowing Bauer's cover, and an ultimatum in season 3, in which a terrorist agrees not to carry out an attack if a high-ranking CTU official is killed. Also, season 4 is notable for a scene in which two men—one of whom possesses crucial information—are dying in a room with only one surgeon.

=== Overview ===
Season	Episodes	Originally released	
Season	Episodes	First released	Last released
Day 1	24	November 6, 2001	May 21, 2002
Day 2	24	October 29, 2002	May 20, 2003
Day 3	24	October 28, 2003	May 25, 2004
Day 4	24	January 9, 2005	May 23, 2005
Day 5	24	January 15, 2006	May 22, 2006
Day 6	24	January 14, 2007	May 21, 2007
Redemption	1	November 23, 2008	
Day 7	24	January 11, 2009	May 18, 2009
Day 8	24	January 17, 2010	May 24, 2010
Live Another Day	12	May 5, 2014	July 14, 2014

Season 1 begins at midnight on the day of the California presidential primary in Los Angeles. Counter Terrorist Unit Agent Jack Bauer's objective is to protect presidential candidate Senator David Palmer from an assassination attempt and rescue his own family from those responsible, the Drazen syndicate, led by Serbian war criminal Victor Drazen, and his sons, Alexis and Andre, who seek retribution for Jack and Palmer's involvement with a covert American mission in the Balkans.

Season 2, set 18 months later, begins at 8:00 a.m. Jack must stop a nuclear bomb from detonating in Los Angeles, then assist the now-President Palmer in proving who is responsible for the threat and avoid war between the U.S. and three Middle Eastern countries.

Season 3, set three years later, begins at 1:00 p.m. Jack must infiltrate a Mexican drug cartel led by Ramon and Hector Salazar, to seize a deadly virus being marketed underground. President Palmer must deal with a potential scandal that could cost him his presidency.

Season 4, set 18 months later, begins at 7:00 a.m. Jack must save the lives of his new boss, United States Secretary of Defense James Heller, who Jack now works for as a special assistant, and Heller's daughter Audrey Raines (with whom Jack is romantically involved) when they are kidnapped by terrorists. However, Turkish terrorist mastermind Habib Marwan uses this as a disguise to launch further attacks against America, and Jack is forced to use unorthodox methods to stop him, which results in long-term consequences for both Jack and the United States.

Season 5, set 18 months after, begins at 7:00 a.m. Jack is believed to be dead by everyone except a few of his closest friends. He is forced to resurface when some of those friends are assassinated and he is framed by terrorists with connections to the U.S. government. The acquisition of nerve gas by the terrorists poses a new threat, and Jack discovers an insidious conspiracy while trying to stop those responsible.

Season 6, set 20 months later, begins at 6:00 a.m. Jack is released after being captured by Chinese official Cheng Zhi and being detained in a Chinese prison following the events of Season 5. Terrorists led by Abu Fayed who hold a vendetta against Jack plot to set off suitcase nuclear devices in America. Later, Jack is forced to choose between those he loves and national security when the Chinese set their sights on sensitive circuitry that could trigger a war between the U.S. and Russia.

Redemption, set three-and-a-half years later, begins at 3:00 p.m. Jack finds himself caught up in a military coup d'état in the fictional African nation of Sangala. Militants are being provided assistance from officials within the United States, where Senator Allison Taylor is being sworn into office as president. Due to the 2007–08 Writers' Strike, season seven was delayed one year. To bridge the one-and-a-half-year gap between seasons, Redemption was produced. This television film aired on November 23, 2008.

Season 7, set 65 days after the end of Redemption, begins at 8:00 a.m. CTU is disbanded, and Jack is assisted by the FBI and covert operatives when the firewall for America's federal computer infrastructure is breached by the same people responsible for a conflict in Sangala. Jack must uncover corruption within the now-President Taylor's administration, which has allowed the Sangalans to raid the White House and capture Taylor. She is later blackmailed by Starkwood, a fictional private military company led by its CEO, Jonas Hodges, in an attempt to release biological weapons on U.S. soil.

Season 8, set 18 months later, begins at 4:00 p.m. Jack is brought in by the now-reinstated CTU to uncover a Russian plot to assassinate Middle Eastern leader Omar Hassan, the President of the fictional country of the Islamic Republic of Kamistan, during peace negotiations with President Taylor at the United Nations in New York City. Russia's contingency plan involves engineering a dirty bomb, which Islamic extremists threaten to detonate in Manhattan unless Hassan is handed over. Jack later seeks retribution for personal losses suffered, including the death of ex-FBI Special Agent Renee Walker, after former President Charles Logan convinces Taylor to cover up these crimes to protect the peace agreement. Jack finds himself at odds with both the Russian and U.S. governments.

Live Another Day, set four years later, begins at 11:00 a.m. and finds a fugitive Jack in London trying to stop an assassination attempt on the now-President Heller and later a drone terrorist attack on London by terrorist Margot Al-Harazi while being hunted by but later working with the CIA. Later, Jack must prevent an old enemy, Cheng Zhi, and Russian diplomat Anatol Stolnavich, from sparking a war between the U.S. and China.

== Cast and characters ==
The following cast members have been credited as main cast in the opening credits:

Actor/actress	Character	Appearances										
Actor/actress	Character	S1	S2	S3	S4	S5	S6	R	S7	S8	LAD	Total
Kiefer Sutherland	Jack Bauer	Main	Main	Main	Main	Main	Main	Main	Main	Main	Main	205
Leslie Hope	Teri Bauer	Main										24
Sarah Clarke	Nina Myers	Main	Recurring	Recurring								36
Elisha Cuthbert	Kim Bauer	Main	Main	Main		Recurring			Recurring	Recurring		79
Dennis Haysbert	David Palmer	Main	Main	Main	Recurring	Recurring						80
Carlos Bernard	Tony Almeida	Recurring	Main	Main	Recurring	Main			Main		Guest^{[a]}	115
Penny Johnson Jerald	Sherry Palmer	Recurring	Main	Recurring								45
Xander Berkeley	George Mason	Recurring	Main									27
Eric Balfour	Milo Pressman	Recurring					Main					28
Sarah Wynter	Kate Warner		Main	Guest								25
Reiko Aylesworth	Michelle Dessler		Recurring	Main	Recurring	Guest						62
James Badge Dale	Chase Edmunds			Main								24
Mary Lynn Rajskub	Chloe O'Brian			Recurring	Recurring	Main	Main		Main	Main	Main	137
D. B. Woodside	Wayne Palmer			Recurring		Recurring	Main					48
Kim Raver	Audrey Raines				Main	Main	Recurring				Main	64
Alberta Watson	Erin Driscoll				Main							12
Lana Parrilla	Sarah Gavin				Main^{[b]}							12
Roger Cross	Curtis Manning				Main^{[b]}	Main^{[b]}	Recurring					44
William Devane	James Heller				Main	Recurring	Recurring				Main	32
James Morrison	Bill Buchanan				Recurring	Main	Main		Main			64
Gregory Itzin	Charles Logan				Recurring	Main	Recurring			Recurring		45
Louis Lombardi	Edgar Stiles				Recurring	Main						37
Jean Smart	Martha Logan					Main	Guest					24
Carlo Rota	Morris O'Brian					Recurring	Main		Recurring			29
Jayne Atkinson	Karen Hayes					Recurring	Main					30
Peter MacNicol	Tom Lennox						Main	Guest				25
Marisol Nichols	Nadia Yassir						Main					24
Regina King	Sandra Palmer						Main					9
Bob Gunton	Ethan Kanin						Recurring	Main	Main	Recurring		32
Cherry Jones	Allison Taylor							Main	Main	Main		44
Colm Feore	Henry Taylor							Main	Main			13
Annie Wersching	Renee Walker								Main	Main		37
Jeffrey Nordling	Larry Moss								Main			19
Rhys Coiro	Sean Hillinger								Main			10
Janeane Garofalo	Janis Gold								Main			21
Anil Kapoor	Omar Hassan									Main		15
Mykelti Williamson	Brian Hastings									Main		17
Katee Sackhoff	Dana Walsh									Main		20
Chris Diamantopoulos	Rob Weiss									Main		12
John Boyd	Arlo Glass									Main		24
Freddie Prinze Jr.	Cole Ortiz									Main		24
Yvonne Strahovski	Kate Morgan										Main	12
Tate Donovan	Mark Boudreau										Main	12
Gbenga Akinnagbe	Erik Ritter										Main	11
Giles Matthey	Jordan Reed										Main	9
Michael Wincott	Adrian Cross										Main	10
Benjamin Bratt	Steve Navarro										Main	10

Notes

[a] Bernard does not appear in regular Live Another Day episodes, but appears in the story extension mini-episode titled Solitary that was released on the Live Another Day Blu-ray and DVD sets. Bernard also appeared in the 24 spin-off series 24: Legacy.
[b] Both Parrilla and Cross initially appear as guest stars for their first several appearances in season 4 before becoming main cast members.

== Production ==
=== Conception ===
The idea for the series first came from executive producer Joel Surnow, who initially had the idea of a TV show with 24 episodes in a season. Each episode would be an hour long, taking place over the course of a single day. He discussed the idea over the phone with producer Robert Cochran, whose initial response was "Forget it, that's the worst idea I've ever heard, it will never work and it's too hard". They met the next day at the International House of Pancakes in Woodland Hills, Los Angeles, to discuss the idea of this action-espionage series that used the format of real time to create dramatic tension with a race against the clock.

The pilot for 24 was pitched to Fox who immediately bought it, saying they felt that the idea for the series was one that would "move the form of television forward". The episode had a $4 million budget with filming in March 2001. The set of CTU was initially done in a Fox Sports office, with the set reproduced once the series was picked up for the season. The series was supposed to be filmed in Toronto, but due to the variability of Canadian weather, Los Angeles was chosen as a filming location.

The pilot of the series was well received by critics, and was signed on for an initial thirteen episodes. Production began in July 2001, and the premiere was planned for October 30, but because of the September 11 attacks, delayed until November 6. After the first three episodes, Fox greenlit the remaining filmed 11 episodes and following Kiefer Sutherland's Golden Globe win, Fox ordered the second half of the season.

=== Design ===
An example of a 24 split screen with the running clock, from the season 7 finale

Although not the first to do so, 24 embraced the concept of real time. This idea started when producer Joel Surnow thought of the idea of doing "24 episodes in a season, with each episode lasting an hour". They decided that the idea of real time had to make the show a "race against the clock". Each episode takes place over the course of one hour, with time continuing to elapse during the commercial breaks. The exact time is denoted by the digital clock display at the beginning and end of each segment. The protocol is that mundane events, such as travel, sometimes occur during commercial breaks and thus these events are largely unseen. The story time correlates with elapsed viewing time if episodes are broadcast with commercial breaks of set duration inserted at the points prescribed by the episode. In line with the depiction of events in real time, 24 does not use slow motion techniques. The series also does not use flashbacks, except once during the first-season finale. Watched continuously without advertisements, each season would run approximately 17 hours. As a result of the timing nature of the series, a number of visual cues were projected onto the screen.

Another idea was the use of split screens, which was born out of the number of phone calls there were, and because of the element of real time, was used to trace parallel adventures of different characters, and aid in the connecting of characters. It was used by producers to point the audience to where to pay attention, as secondary stories often take place outside of the main plot. The idea of using boxes came later, which made shooting more flexible, as the shot could be cropped and reshaped inside the box. It was from here that the idea of using split screens as an artistic element came into the series.

A major concept used in the series was the idea of a running clock. This initially came from Joel Surnow, who wanted the audience to always know what time it was in the show's fictional timeline. This was done by an on-screen digital clock that appears before and after commercial breaks, and a smaller clock also appears at other points in the narrative. The time shown is the in-universe time of the story. When the running clock is shown full screen, an alternating pulsating beeping noise (like the kind seen on a time bomb) for each second can usually be heard. On rare occasions, a silent clock is used. This usually follows the death of a major character or an otherwise dramatic event.

=== Setting ===
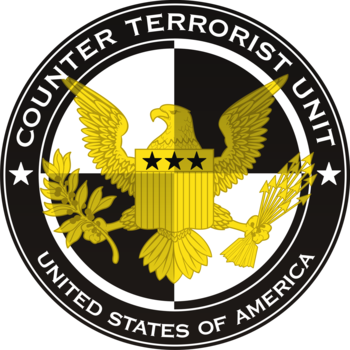
Counter Terrorist Unit

The first six seasons of the show are mostly based in Los Angeles and nearby California locations—both real and fictional. Other locations, such as Washington, D.C., are featured in parts of the fourth, sixth, and seventh seasons. The eighth season takes place in New York City, the TV film Redemption, filmed in South Africa, is mainly set in the fictional African nation of Sangala, and the ninth season Live Another Day is set in London.

The main setting of the show is the fictional Counter Terrorist Unit. Its office consists of two main departments: Field Operations, which involves confronting and apprehending suspects, and Communications, which gathers intelligence and assists those that work in Field Operations. CTU offices are established in various cities with these units reporting to "Divisions", and Divisions reporting to the "District". While CTU itself is a fictional agency, several entities with similar names or duties, like the National Counterterrorism Center, have emerged since the show's debut on television.

The set of CTU was initially filmed in a Fox Sports office, with the set recreated in a studio in Woodland Hills after the series was picked up. The same set was used for the first three seasons, but production moved to an old pencil factory in Chatsworth before the start of the fourth season and the CTU set was redesigned. It was redesigned again before the start of the eighth season. Other sets were also constructed here, such as Charles Logan's presidential retreat shown in seasons five and six, and the White House bunker shown in seasons four and six.

The writers have stated that events in the 24 timeline take place in the "perpetual now," where dates are never specified by the show and concepts of the exact date and year are left vague and unconfirmed; however, in January 2008, producer Howard Gordon confirmed that accounting for the passage of various presidential administrations, the seventh season would be set in 2017.

=== Series conclusion ===
On March 26, 2010, a statement was issued from Fox that explained that season eight would conclude the original series. Kiefer Sutherland gave a statement:

This has been the role of a lifetime, and I will never be able to fully express my appreciation to everyone who made it possible. While the end of the series is bittersweet, we always wanted 24 to finish on a high note, so the decision to make the eighth season our last was one we all agreed upon. This feels like the culmination of all our efforts from the writers to the actors to our fantastic crew and everyone at Fox. Looking ahead to the future, Howard Gordon and I are excited about the opportunity to create the feature film version of 24. But when all is said and done, it is the loyal worldwide fan base that made it possible for me to have the experience of playing the role of Jack Bauer, and for that I am eternally grateful.

Executive producer and showrunner Howard Gordon was also a part of the decision. He was quoted saying:

Kiefer and I have loved every minute of making 24, but we all believe that now is the right time to call it a day. I echo his sentiments of gratitude toward the show's amazing creative team, as well as the studio and network who have always believed in us and shown us unbelievable support.

Peter Rice, Chairman of Entertainment at Fox Networks Group said, "24 is so much more than just a TV show – it has redefined the drama genre and created one of the most admired action icons in television history." Kevin Reilly, President of Entertainment at Fox Broadcasting Company added, "We are extremely proud of this groundbreaking series and will be forever thankful to Kiefer, the producers, the cast and crew for everything they've put into 24 over the years. It's truly been an amazing and unforgettable eight days.

The final episode of season 8 aired on May 24, 2010.

=== Relation to other productions ===
Immediately prior to 24, series co-creators Joel Surnow and Robert Cochran executive-produced La Femme Nikita for its entire five-year run on USA Network. Both series deal with anti-terrorist operations, and the lead characters of both series are placed in situations in which they must make a tragic choice in order to serve the greater good. There are numerous on- and off-screen creative connections between 24 and La Femme Nikita. Several actors from La Femme Nikita have portrayed similar roles on 24, a number of story concepts from La Femme Nikita have been revisited on 24, and many of the creative personnel from La Femme Nikita worked on 24 in their same role.

Similar to the 1997 film, Air Force One, 24 featured the president's personal jumbo-jet (Air Force One). Air Force One was featured in 24 seasons 2 and 4. Air Force Two (carrying the Vice President but not the President) was featured in season 6. Several actors featured in 24, such as Xander Berkeley, Glenn Morshower, Wendy Crewson, Timothy Carhart, Jürgen Prochnow, Tom Everett and Spencer Garrett also appeared in the film Air Force One. The 25th amendment, which deals with succession to the Presidency and establishes procedures for filling a vacancy in the office of the Vice President and responding to presidential disabilities, was also a shared theme between the film and the television series. 24 used the same Air Force One set from another television series, The West Wing.

=== Feature film development ===
A feature film adaptation of 24 was originally planned for the hiatus between the sixth and seventh seasons. Series co-creators Joel Surnow and Robert Cochran were set to write the script with showrunner Howard Gordon working on story. Filming was going to take place in London, Prague, and Morocco. Plans for the film were later put on hold. Kiefer Sutherland explained, "It's impossible to ask writers to work on the show and then come up with an amazing film we can shoot in the break between seasons."

It was later decided that the film would begin after the conclusion of the eighth and final season. It was to be set and shot on-location in Europe. Surnow, Cochran, Gordon, and Sutherland were going to be executive producers on the film, and Billy Ray was going to write the screenplay. Shooting was planned to start in late 2010 or early 2011.

In April 2010, Sutherland said in an interview at a BAFTA event in London that the script was finished and he would be reading it upon his return to the United States. He also said that the film will be a two-hour representation of a twenty-four-hour time frame. Sutherland described the film production as "exciting" because, "It's going to be a two-hour representation of a 24 hour day, so we were not going to be restrained by the real time aspect of the TV show."

In June 2010, it was reported that plans were made to create a film titled Die Hard 24/7, which would serve as a crossover between 24 and the Die Hard franchise, with Sutherland to reprise his role as Jack Bauer alongside Bruce Willis' John McClane. However, these plans never came to fruition, with the studio instead opting to create the film A Good Day to Die Hard.

In November 2010, executive producer Gordon revealed that a "work in progress" screenplay was being read by Fox, but that the film did not yet have a green-light or fixed schedule. In December 2010, Gordon revealed that Fox turned down the script by Ray, stating, "It wasn't strong enough or compelling enough". By that time, Gordon was no longer involved with the project, but stated that director Tony Scott would pitch an idea to Sutherland, an involvement ending with Scott's death in August 2012.

Executive producer Brian Grazer tweeted in April 2011 that the film was planned for a 2012 release. At the 2011 Television Critics Association press tour, former showrunner Gordon stated that "conversations are definitely happening" about the film, and that they are just looking for the right script before moving forward. In September 2011, Sutherland indicated the script was almost complete. After some small script alterations by screenwriter Mark Bomback, filming was announced to begin in spring 2012, after Sutherland became available in April.

In March 2012, 20th Century Fox stopped production before filming could begin. Budgetary issues remained unresolved and Sutherland's narrow time frame for filming were cited as reasons for halting production. However, in July 2012, Sutherland assured the film was still in plans and that they would begin filming in summer 2013. The film was eventually suspended in May 2013 after the announcement that the show would return as a limited series.

Sutherland said in January 2014 that "the film is an ongoing situation." After Live Another Day received highly positive reception, a new idea for the feature film surfaced in September 2014, spearheaded by Grazer. In January 2016, Sutherland stated that he has "no idea if the 24 movie will ever happen, or Jack Bauer might end up finding his way into an episode one day and clarifying all of that, or ending all of that." This was in reference to concluding his character's story arc in a future iteration of the franchise.

In July 2024, it was reported that a 24 feature film was in early development at 20th Century Studios and Imagine Entertainment. In November 2025, Imagine Entertainment president Justin Wilkes said there were plans to continue 24 with Jack Bauer by way of a theatrical film or follow-up television series.

=== Live Another Day ===
In May 2013, Deadline Hollywood first reported that Fox was considering a limited-run "event series" for 24 based on a concept by Howard Gordon, after failed efforts to produce the 24 feature film and the cancellation of Kiefer Sutherland's series Touch. The following week, Fox officially announced 24: Live Another Day, a limited-run series of twelve episodes that would feature the return of Jack Bauer. Fox CEO Kevin Reilly said that the series would essentially represent the twelve "most important" hours of a typical 24 season, with jumps forward between hours as needed. As with the rest of Fox's push into event programming, the production was said to have "a big scope and top talent and top marketing budgets."

In June 2013, it was announced that Jon Cassar was signed to executive produce and direct multiple episodes of Live Another Day, including the first two. Executive producers and writers Robert Cochran, Manny Coto and Evan Katz were also announced to return with Sean Callery returning as the music composer for the series.

Mary Lynn Rajskub was announced as the second official cast member in August 2013, reprising her role as Chloe O'Brian. In October 2013, it was confirmed that Kim Raver and William Devane would reprise their roles as Audrey Raines and James Heller, respectively. New actors joining the cast included Michael Wincott as Adrian Cross, an infamous hacker; Gbenga Akinnagbe and Giles Matthey as CIA agents Erik Ritter and Jordan Reed, respectively; Benjamin Bratt as Steve Navarro, the head of CIA operations tracking Jack Bauer in London; Yvonne Strahovski as Kate Morgan, a "brilliant but impulsive CIA field operative in London"; and Stephen Fry as Alistair Davies, the British Prime Minister. In October 2013, it was confirmed the series would be set and filmed in London, England.

24: Live Another Day premiered on May 5, 2014, on Fox. The series is set four years after the events of season 8, and adheres to the original real time concept: The main plot is set between 11:00 a.m. and 10:50 p.m., with each episode corresponding to an hour; however, the concluding episode's final part features a 12-hour time jump enabling the show to join up the full 24 hour period back to 11:00 a.m.

=== Legacy ===
In January 2015, another installment of the franchise was pitched by executive producers Howard Gordon, Evan Katz, Manny Coto and Brian Grazer, which would revolve around a stable of supporting characters rather than Kiefer Sutherland in the lead role. In January 2016, Fox announced it had ordered a pilot for a spin-off series titled 24: Legacy, which would feature a new cast, with no returning characters except Tony Almeida (Carlos Bernard). The series retains the real-time format, but consists of 12 episodes, using a time jump to cover a single day. Stephen Hopkins, who directed the original 24 pilot and several first-season episodes, directed the Legacy pilot. Jon Cassar also returned to direct and produce 6 of the 12 episodes. Corey Hawkins and Miranda Otto play the two lead characters – Hawkins as Eric Carter, a military hero returning home and Otto as Rebecca Ingram, a former head of CTU. The pilot was officially ordered to series in April 2016 and premiered on February 5, 2017, immediately after Super Bowl LI. In June 2017, the series was canceled after one season.

=== Other spin-offs ===
In July 2018, it was announced that Fox was in the early stages of developing a prequel series that would tell the origin story about Jack Bauer in his early days. Original creators Joel Surnow and Robert Cochran and executive producer Howard Gordon were set to write the script with. In August 2018, it was announced that Fox was also developing another potential spin-off, which would be a legal thriller. In February 2019, Fox passed on the legal thriller, but were continuing to develop the prequel. In January 2020, Fox confirmed that they had scrapped the potential prequel series as well.

In September 2021, Deadline Hollywood reported that Fox was in "active creative talks" to bring the franchise back in a new form. Kiefer Sutherland later denied in January 2022 that such conversations were taking place, although he confirmed that he had been discussing the potential for future seasons of the show with Howard Gordon, the series' showrunner, and that he supports an idea of a series focusing on an entirely new cast tasked with rescuing Jack Bauer from a Russian prison. He later went on to tell Variety in April 2022 that he is open to new seasons of the show, as he views Jack Bauer's story as "unresolved".

=== Other media ===
A significant amount of additional media relating to the series has been created, including Internet-distributed spin-off series such as The Rookie and 24: Conspiracy, as well as a video game. Other media include action figures of some of the main characters, soundtracks from both the series and the video game, and a number of novels covering different events not covered in the series. Additionally, a number of in-universe books were created, as well as behind the scenes books containing information on how the series was created.

== Influence and reception ==
=== Reaction ===
Critical response of 24
Season	Rotten Tomatoes	Metacritic
1	95% (21 reviews)	88 (27 reviews)
2	95% (19 reviews)	83 (23 reviews)
3	93% (15 reviews)	72 (14 reviews)
4	95% (21 reviews)	79 (19 reviews)
5	100% (22 reviews)	89 (21 reviews)
6	74% (31 reviews)	79 (23 reviews)
Redemption	80% (20 reviews)	—N/a
7	76% (33 reviews)	72 (21 reviews)
8	75% (40 reviews)	67 (19 reviews)
Live Another Day	82% (55 reviews)	70 (40 reviews)

Throughout its run 24 was frequently cited by critics as one of the best shows on television. Its fifth season was its most critically acclaimed season, scoring universally positive reviews from critics, with the last three seasons each receiving generally favorable reviews. 24 has been called groundbreaking and innovative with Time stating that the show took "the trend of serial story 'arcs', which began with '80s dramas like Hill Street Blues and Wiseguy and which continues on The West Wing and The Sopranos to the "next level" and another critic saying that it "feels like no TV show you've ever seen". The production and quality of the series has been frequently called "filmlike" and better than most films. The series has been compared to old-fashioned film serials, like The Perils of Pauline.

The quality of the acting was particularly celebrated by critics. Robert Bianco of USA Today described Kiefer Sutherland as indispensable to the series, and that he had a "great, under-sung performance". Dennis Haysbert's "commanding" performance as David Palmer was hailed by critics, with some believing the character helped the campaign of Barack Obama. David Leonhart of The New York Times praised Gregory Itzin's portrayal of President Charles Logan, comparing his character to former U.S. President Richard Nixon. The New York Times characterized Logan's administration as "a projection of our very worst fears" of the government. Jean Smart's portrayal of Martha Logan in the fifth season was equally acclaimed. The character's opening scene (in which she, unsatisfied with her hairdo, dunks her head into a sink) was called "the most memorable character debut in 24 history". The finale of season one is seen by many critics as one of the best episodes of the series and is frequently cited as one of the best television season finales of all time. Teri Bauer's death at the end of the finale was voted by TV Guide as the second-most shocking death in television history.

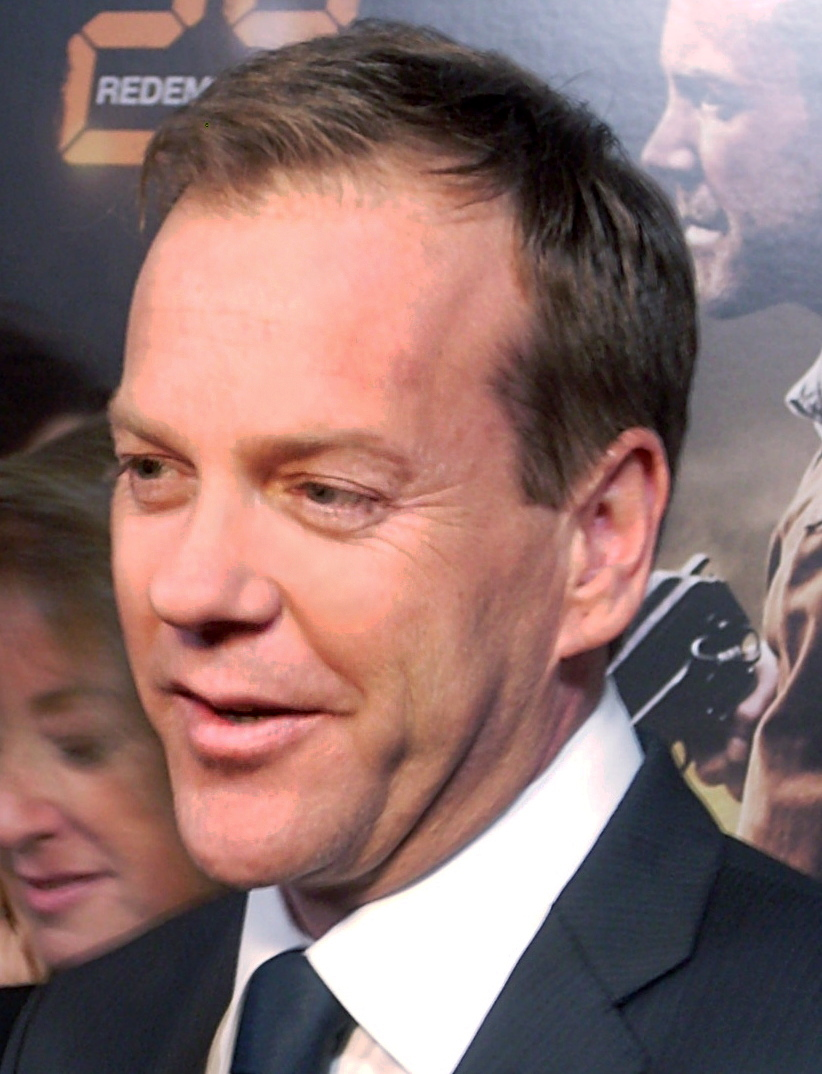
Kiefer Sutherland's portrayal of Jack Bauer revived his career and won many awards.

Towards the middle of 24's run, the series attracted significant criticism for its depictions of torture, as well as its negative portrayal of Muslims. The frequent use of ticking time bomb scenarios in storylines, as well as the main character, Jack Bauer portraying torture as normal, effective, acceptable and glamorous, was criticized by human rights activists, military officials, and experts in questioning and interrogation, with concerns raised that junior U.S. soldiers were imitating techniques shown on the series. In response to these concerns, members of the U.S. military met with the creators of the show. Partly as a result of these discussions, and the military's appeal to the creators of the show to tone down the scenes of torture since it was having an impact on U.S. troops, there was a reduction in torture in subsequent seasons of the series. However, the writers stated that they reduced the number of torture scenes, not as a concession, but because it was starting to overwhelm the storytelling.

The issue of torture on the series was discussed by President Bill Clinton who stated that he does not feel there is a place in U.S. policy for torture, but "If you're the Jack Bauer person, you'll do whatever you do and you should be prepared to take the consequences." Supreme Court Justice Antonin Scalia, during a discussion about terrorism, torture and the law, took offense at a Canadian judge's remark that Canada, "thankfully", did not consider what Jack Bauer would do when setting policy. He reportedly responded with a defense of Bauer, arguing that law enforcement officials deserve latitude in times of great crisis, and that no jury would convict Bauer in those types of situations.

The use of torture and the negative portrayal of Muslims affected the decisions of some actors who intended to join the series. Janeane Garofalo, who portrayed Janis Gold on the series, initially turned down the role because of the way the series depicted torture, but later took up the role, saying that "being unemployed and being flattered that someone wanted to work with me outweighed my stance." Shohreh Aghdashloo, who portrayed Dina Araz, initially had reservations about taking on the role, as she initially felt that taking on the role of a Muslim terrorist would alienate people who support her as an activist, as she had spent many years in Iran advocating for women's rights and fought against the stereotyping of Muslim-Americans. However, she took on the role as she felt that people would understand that the show was fiction.

During an interview for his new television series Homeland, 24 executive producer Howard Gordon addressed the impact of the series, describing it as "stunning – everyone from Rush Limbaugh to Bill Clinton would talk about it, and we knew they were among our fans. I guess when people used it as propaganda for their own ideas—you know, when Justice Scalia mentioned Jack Bauer—that would make me feel uncomfortable." On the topic of torture and Islamophobia within the series, Gordon said, "I think the one thing that we all felt very confident about—although we had a vigorous behind-the-scenes debate—was at what point are we loyal and beholden to good storytelling, and at what level do you hold yourself accountable for things like stoking Islamophobia or promoting torture as a policy? There were just certain things that we needed to portray in order to make it feel thrilling—and real, even. When discussing his regrets, he referred to an advertisement for the show for its fourth season (though mistakenly quoted it as an advertisement for the second season), saying "I actually do have regrets about one particular moment, which had more to do with the promotion of the show. In season four, the story involved a Muslim American family, and the father and the mother—and the son—were party to a terror plot. It was sort of a purple conceit in a way. But it was maybe a year and a half after 9/11, and on the 405 freeway there's this giant electronic billboard, and I think the line was: 'They could be next door.' The writers and the producers were not party to that campaign, but we quickly put an end to it, and realized how dangerous and potentially incendiary this show could be. And I think our awareness of that changed the way we approached the series. So I guess you could call it a regret, but it was really an epiphany."

After the series finale, the Los Angeles Times characterized the series as "an epic poem, with Jack Bauer in the role of Odysseus or Beowulf. Which means he needed to be fighting monsters, not essentially decent people who have made one very bad decision." The critic went on to say that villain Charles Logan encapsulated all that "Jack and 24 fought against for so long: political corruption and cowardice, narcissism and megalomania, ruthlessness and stupidity." One reviewer for BuddyTV said that "I'll remember the legacy of 24 as an action drama that redefined what serialized television can do and provided many shocking twists and turns along the way—the biggest one being the very real impact the show had on American foreign policy." The New York Times said "24 will live on, possibly as a feature film, and surely in classrooms and in textbooks. The series enlivened the country's political discourse in a way few others have, partly because it brought to life the ticking time-bomb threat that haunted the Cheney faction of the American government in the years after 9/11." The show was declared the sixth-highest-rated show for the first ten years of IMDb.com Pro (2002–2012).

=== Ratings ===
Seasonal rankings were based on average total viewers per episode of 24 on Fox. Most American network television seasons start in mid-September and end in late May, which coincides with the completion of May sweeps. 24 aired during both February and May sweeps periods in all of its seasons, and during the November sweeps period in its first three seasons. Beginning with its fourth season, 24 began its season in January and aired new episodes non-stop until May.

Season	Timeslot (EST/EDT)	Number of Episodes	Premiere		Finale		TV Season	Overall rank	Overall viewership
Season	Timeslot (EST/EDT)	Number of Episodes	Date	Viewers (millions)	Date	Viewers (millions)	TV Season	Overall rank	Overall viewership
1	Tuesday; 9:00 p.m.	24	November 6, 2001	11.64	May 21, 2002	9.25	2001–02	76	8.60
2	Tuesday; 9:00 p.m.	24	October 29, 2002	13.50	May 20, 2003	14.20	2002–03	36	11.73
3	Tuesday; 9:00 p.m.	24	October 28, 2003	11.57	May 25, 2004	12.31	2003–04	42	10.30
4	Monday; 9:00 p.m.	24	January 9, 2005	15.31	May 23, 2005	12.23	2005	29	11.90
5	Monday; 9:00 p.m.	24	January 15, 2006	17.01	May 22, 2006	13.75	2006	24	13.78
6	Monday; 9:00 p.m.	24	January 14, 2007	15.79	May 21, 2007	10.30	2007	27	13.00
7	Monday; 9:00 p.m.	24	January 11, 2009	12.61	May 18, 2009	9.65	2009	20	12.62
8	Monday; 9:00 p.m.	24	January 17, 2010	11.50	May 24, 2010	9.31	2010	39	9.31
9	Monday; 9:00 p.m.	12	May 5, 2014	8.08	July 14, 2014	6.47	2014		6.33

=== Awards and nominations ===
24 has changed the face of television–one hour, one minute, one second at a time. This is a masterpiece of episodic storytelling and continues to deal with the bright color issues in America's war on terror with a degree of difficulty that is off today's television charts. Powerful and involving, with characters who are more fully realized with each season, the show still has viewers on the edge of their seats, both riveted to the action and begging, pleading for a modicum of relief.

— Judges of the American Film Institute on the show's inclusion in the 2005 list.

The series was nominated for and won several other television awards including the Emmy Awards, Golden Globe Awards, and Screen Actors Guild Awards. It is one of only five TV series (along with NYPD Blue, The West Wing, Breaking Bad and Homeland) ever to have won the Emmy Award, the Golden Globe and the Satellite Award for Best Drama Series.

24 was nominated in categories for acting, directing, writing, editing, sound, music score, and stunt coordination. The American Film Institute included 24 in its 2005 list of 10 Television Programs of the Year.

The series received 68 Emmy nominations, with 20 wins. It received nominations for Outstanding Drama Series at the Primetime Emmys in 2002, 2003, 2004, 2005, and won the award in 2006. Kiefer Sutherland received nominations in 2002, 2003, 2004, 2005, 2007, and 2009 (for 24: Redemption) and won in 2006. Joel Surnow and Robert Cochran won for Outstanding Writing for a Drama Series in 2002 for the pilot episode. Composer Sean Callery received nine nominations for Outstanding Music Composition for a Series, nominated for every season and 24: Redemption; he won in 2003, 2006, and 2010.

The series' fifth season was its most successful for awards, earning twelve Emmy nominations and five wins, including Outstanding Drama Series and Outstanding Lead Actor in a Drama for Sutherland (after being nominated every year previous). Jon Cassar won for Outstanding Directing in a Drama Series, and Itzin and Smart received Best Supporting Actor/Actress in a Drama Series nominations. In 2009, Cherry Jones won for Outstanding Supporting Actress in a Drama.

The series received twelve Golden Globe nominations with two wins. It received nominations for Best Drama Series at the Golden Globes in 2001, 2002, 2004, and 2006, winning in 2003, and Kiefer Sutherland received nominations at the Golden Globes in 2002, 2003, 2005, 2006, and 2008 (for 24: Redemption), winning in 2001. Dennis Haysbert received a nomination for Best Supporting Role in 2002.

The series received ten Screen Actors Guild nominations with four wins. It was nominated for Outstanding Performance by an Ensemble in a Drama Series in 2003, 2005, and 2007 at the Screen Actors Guild Awards. Kiefer Sutherland was nominated in 2003, 2004, 2005, 2006, and 2007, winning in 2004 and 2006. The series won for Outstanding Performance by a Stunt Ensemble in a TV Series in 2008 and 2010. In 2008, Empire magazine ranked 24 as the sixth-greatest television show of all time. In 2013, the series was listed as #71 in the Writers Guild of America's list of the 101 Best Written TV Series. In September 2019, The Guardian ranked the series 90th on its list of the 100 best TV shows of the 21st century, calling it "the most gripping TV drama of the 00s".

== Distribution ==
24 was distributed across the globe. Kiefer Sutherland attributed the show's strong support from Fox to its early success in the UK. Its viewership in the UK decreased significantly when BBC Two lost the rights to subscription channel Sky One after the second season.

Fox's then-sister cable network FX aired a 24-hour marathon of the first season on September 1, 2002 (Labor Day).

The release of 24 on DVD had a significant impact on the success of the television series. In an interview with IGN in 2002, Sutherland revealed, "[24's] success in [the UK] was phenomenal. It was the biggest show the BBC has ever had. It was the number one DVD there, knocking off The Lord of the Rings, which is unheard of for a television show DVD to actually knock-out every feature DVD available. And that's because they showed it without commercials." The American sales of the season one DVDs increased the audience size of season two by 25%.

A special edition of the first season was released on May 20, 2008. The new set includes a seventh disc of bonus features, while discs 1–6 contain all 24 episodes with deleted scenes, audio commentaries, and 5 extended episodes. The set was packaged in a steel box.

The television film 24: Redemption was released on DVD in Region 1 on November 25, 2008, and in Region 2 on December 1, 2008. The DVD contains the broadcast version as well as an extended version with optional audio commentary, a making-of featurette, child soldiers in Africa featurette, a season 6 recap, and the first 17 minutes of the season 7 premiere episode.

The seventh season was the first season to be released on Blu-ray format. The eighth season, also on Blu-ray, was released simultaneously with the complete series set on DVD. On December 2, 2017, all eight seasons, 24: Redemption, 24: Live Another Day and 24: Legacy were released on Blu-ray individually and in a box set by Fox Japan.

All eight seasons and 24: Redemption are available for purchase or rental on iTunes, Amazon Video on Demand, and previously the Zune Marketplace. 24 was available on Netflix in the United States, but was pulled from the service on April 1, 2014, and also pulled from the UK. The show was pulled from Netflix Canada on January 1, 2018. In 2021, the series was added to streaming service Disney+ worldwide and Hulu in the United States following the acquisition of 21st Century Fox by Disney in 2019. All episodes were made available in HD.

In Australia, 24: The Complete Series was released on December 1, 2010, and was re-issued with a new designed box on November 2, 2016.

DVD release	Episodes	Originally aired	Release date		
DVD release	Episodes	Originally aired	Region 1	Region 2	Region 4
Season One	24	2001–02	September 17, 2002	October 14, 2002	December 3, 2002
Season Two	24	2002–03	September 9, 2003	August 11, 2003	November 11, 2003
Season Three	24	2003–04	December 7, 2004	August 9, 2004	September 7, 2004
Season Four	24	2005	December 6, 2005	August 8, 2005	November 2005
Season Five	24	2006	December 5, 2006	November 6, 2006	December 6, 2006
Season Six	24	2007	December 4, 2007	October 1, 2007	September 19, 2007
24: Redemption	1 (Two hours)	2008	November 25, 2008	December 1, 2008	February 11, 2009
Season Seven	24	2009	May 19, 2009	October 19, 2009	November 11, 2009
Season Eight	24	2010	December 14, 2010	November 8, 2010	December 1, 2010
24: Live Another Day	12	2014	September 30, 2014	October 6, 2014	October 1, 2014

== Adaptations ==
=== India ===
In November 2011, Anil Kapoor purchased the rights to 24 to make an Indian adaptation of the series. Kapoor, who played Omar Hassan in season eight of the original series, plays the lead role in the adaptation that is based on Jack Bauer, and also produces the series. The series debuted in India on the television channel Colors on October 4, 2013.

=== Japan ===
A 24-episode adaptation debuted in Japan on October 9, 2020, on the television channel TV Asahi. It stars Toshiaki Karasawa as CTU agent Genba Shidō.
