= Robert Cochran (TV producer) =

American television producer and writer

- Education: Stanford Law School
- Occupations: Screenwriter; Producer; Author
- Notable work: La Femme Nikita; 24

Robert Cochran (also credited as Bob Cochran) is an American writer and producer for television, most known for co-creating two award-winning series in the 2000s: La Femme Nikita and 24.

== Background ==
Cochran graduated from Stanford Law School in 1974. Prior to a television writing career, he was a lawyer and management consultant. A screenwriter friend once showed him a script he'd written, the first time Cochran had ever seen one. Having written mostly in prose fiction, Cochran was new to the format and began gravitating towards a career in screenwriting, eventually leaving consulting to work in Hollywood.

== Early television writing career ==
Between 1987 and 2001, Cochran wrote for shows such as L.A. Law, Falcon Crest and JAG, and wrote and produced for the cop series The Commish starring Michael Chiklis. He also wrote for the miniseries Attila starring Gerard Butler. In 1997 Cochran and his writing partner Joel Surnow created and produced the spy series La Femme Nikita starring Peta Wilson, also serving as the show's consultants. It ran for five seasons.

== Birth of 24 ==
The concept for 24 initially came from Surnow: a TV show where each episode would play out in real time and the entirety of the first season would cover a 24-hour period. Cochran was unconvinced until they met the next day and fleshed out the idea of an action-espionage series with a dramatic race against the clock. They spent most of 2000 developing the plot and characters and writing the pilot, and pitched it to Fox in early 2001. The network immediately bought the show, confident it would "move the form of television forward." It premiered on November 6, 2001, and was an instant hit.

Cochran and Surnow won an Emmy for Outstanding Writing for a Drama Series in 2002 for 24's pilot episode, and would go on to win multiple Emmy and Golden Globe Awards for the show.

== Other projects ==
In 2006, Cochran and Surnow made partnership with Howard Gordon, another 24 producer, to develop projects at Fox.

In 2007, Cochran and David Hemingson created the medical comedy The Call starring Kal Penn. The pilot went unsold. That same year, Cochran and David Ehrman wrote and executive produced the TV spy movie Company Man starring Jason Behr and Stana Katic. In 2014 Cochran returned to write for 24: Live Another Day. In 2016, he wrote for the spin-off series 24: Legacy.

Cochran's production company is Real Time Productions.

== Books ==
Cochran wrote the young adult fantasy novel The Sword and the Dagger, released by Macmillan Publishers in 2019.
