= Joel Surnow =

American television writer and producer

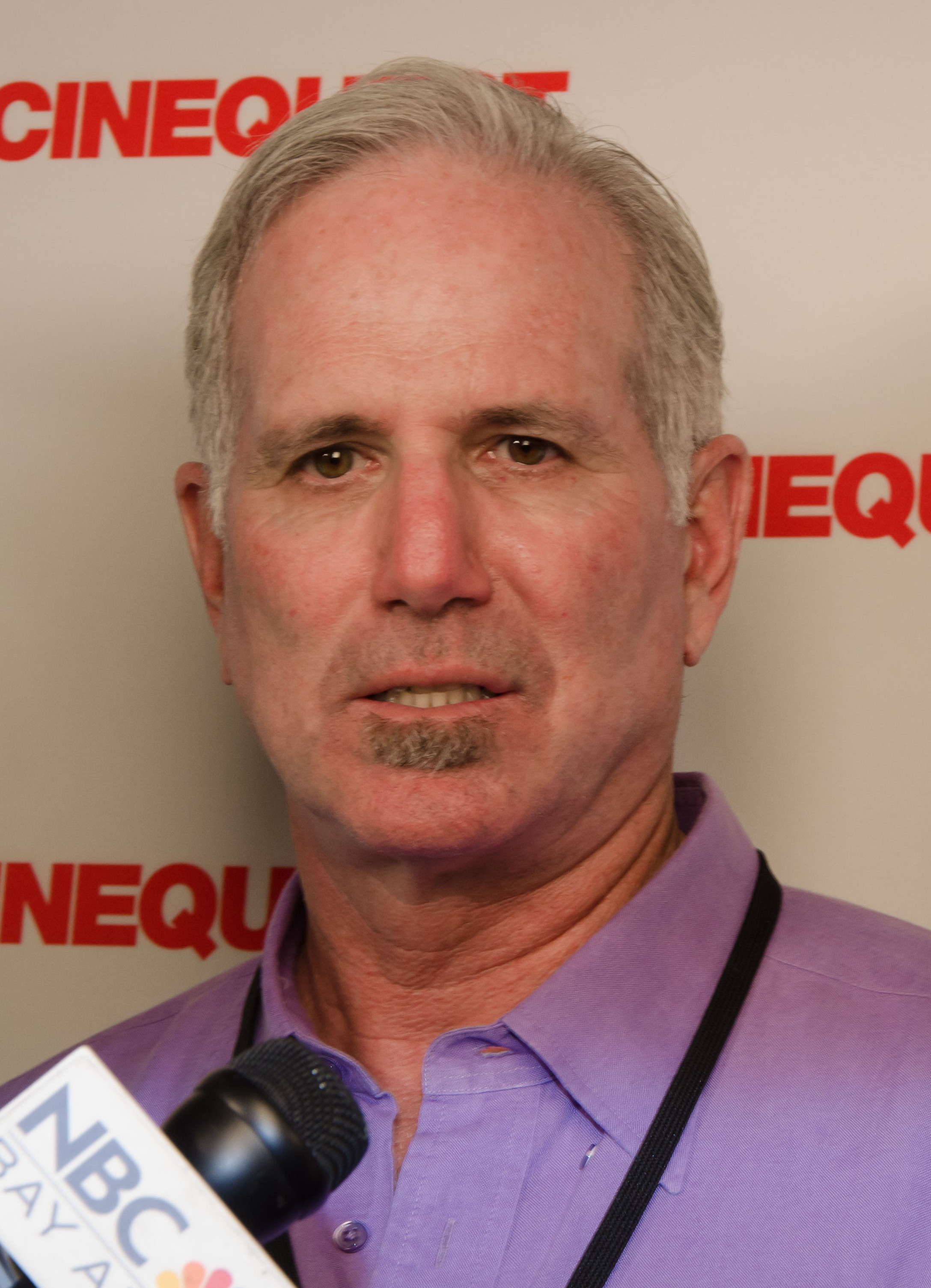
- Surnow in 2014
- Born: December 18, 1955 (age 70); Detroit, Michigan, U.S.
- Occupations: Writer, producer
- Spouse(s): Wendy Cozen; Colleen Surnow (1989–present)
- Children: 5

Joel Surnow (born December 18, 1955) is an American television writer and producer. He is the co-creator of the action series La Femme Nikita and 24.

== Life and career ==
Joel Surnow is of Jewish descent. He was raised in Michigan and later Los Angeles. Surnow attended the University of California, Berkeley for two years, and eventually graduated from UCLA film school in 1976.

Soon after graduation, he began writing for film; he then switched to television. His breakthrough came when he began writing for Miami Vice, in 1984. By the end of the year, Universal Studios, which owned the show, assigned Surnow to The Equalizer, as Supervising Producer, about a CIA officer turned vigilante.

He has five daughters, two from a previous marriage and three with his current wife.

Surnow was the co-creator and executive producer of the 1997–2001 television series La Femme Nikita, which was the top-rated drama on basic cable its first two seasons. In addition to being Supervising Producer and writing for The Equalizer and serving as executive story editor on the first season of Miami Vice, he has written scripts for a number of other TV series, including Nowhere Man and Wiseguy.

Following La Femme Nikita, Surnow's most successful work was on the TV series 24, which he co-created and also executive produced with Robert Cochran. In 2006, 24 won Emmy awards for Outstanding Drama Series, accepted by Surnow and his fellow producers, including Robert Cochran, and Outstanding Lead Actor Kiefer Sutherland, who also won a Golden Globe. Surnow and Cochran had previously won an Emmy for 24 in 2002, for their writing of the series' pilot episode. Surnow quit his role as executive producer of the series on February 12, 2008. His production company was Real Time Productions. In 2006, the duo made partnership with Howard Gordon, another 24 producer to develop projects at Fox under his Real Time Productions company.

Surnow also created The 1/2 Hour News Hour, a comedy show described by Surnow as "The Daily Show for conservatives". The first episode aired on February 18, 2007, receiving poor reviews. Although the initial ratings were very good, subsequent ratings dropped dramatically. The show was canceled six months later, after airing only seven episodes.,

Also in 2007, Surnow teamed up with Six Flags to create "Operation SpyGirl", a stunt show made exclusively for Six Flags Great America in association with Asylum Entertainment. The show followed the story of SpyGirl as she attempted to save Gurnee, Illinois (the park's location) from the evil Max Condor in just 24 minutes. Prior to the show's opening, Six Flags had plans to bring the Operation SpyGirl brand to some of its other parks including the now-cancelled Six Flags Dubailand, as well as a possible extension of the IP to television or film, but those plans were canceled once the show proved to be a failure with guests.

Joel made his directorial debut with Small Time; it was released by Freestyle Releasing on April 18, 2014.

== Personal life ==
Surnow identifies as politically conservative and has spoken about being a political minority in Hollywood. His second wife is Catholic and they sent their three daughters to Catholic schools. He has stated, "I decided I liked Catholics. They're so grounded. I sort of reoriented myself".
