= Howard Gordon =

American television writer and producer (born 1961)

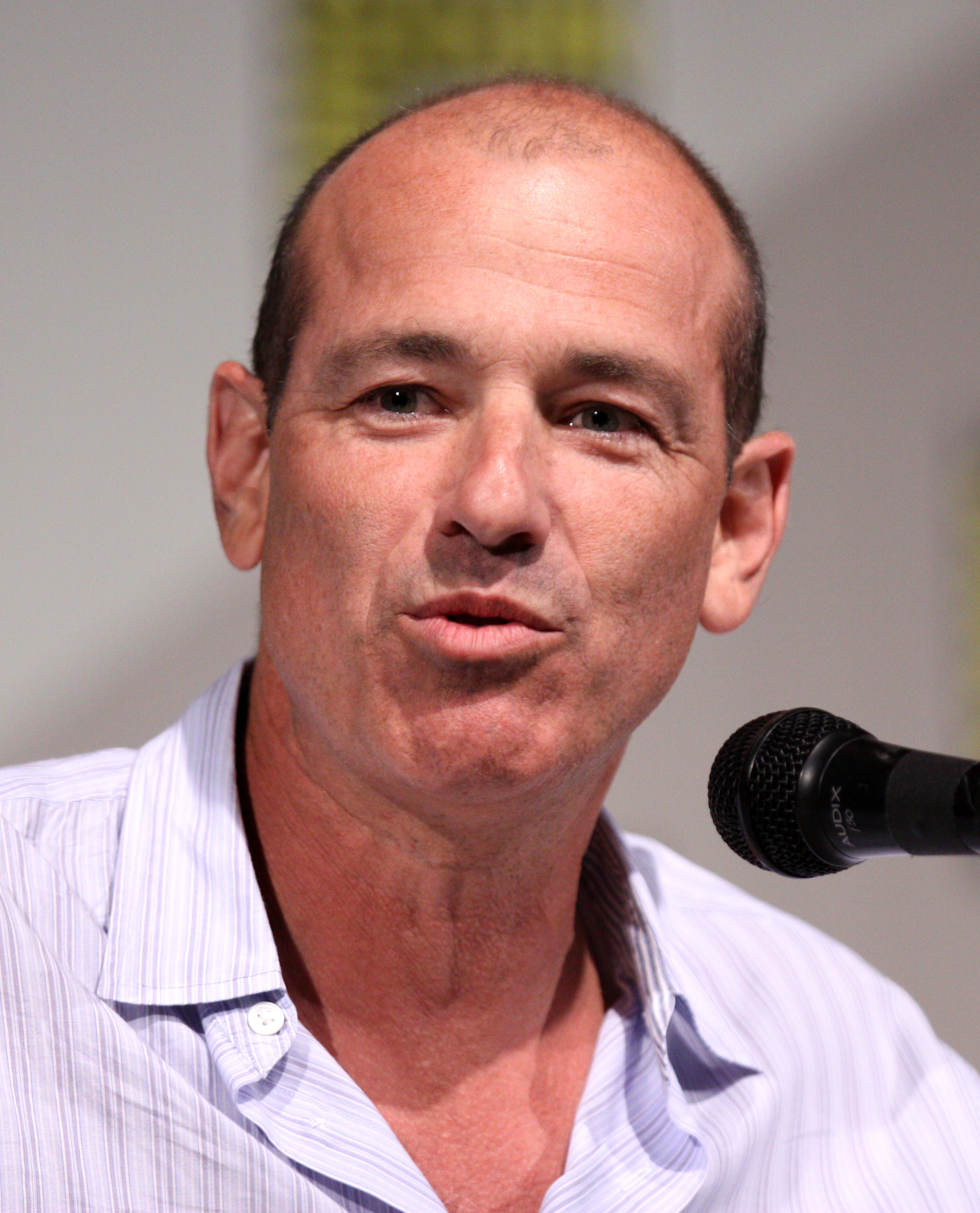
- Gordon at San Diego Comic-Con in July 2011.
- Born: March 31, 1961 (age 65); Queens, New York, U.S.
- Occupations: Screenwriter; producer
- Spouse: Cami Gordon (3 children)
- Awards: Emmy for Outstanding Drama; 2006 24; 2012 Homeland; Emmy for Outstanding Writing; 2012 Homeland: "Pilot Episode" shared with Alex Gansa and Gideon Raff

Howard Gordon (born March 31, 1961) is an American screenwriter and producer. He is well known for his work on the Fox action series 24, on the Showtime thriller Homeland which he co-developed with Alex Gansa; the FX political drama Tyrant, which he co-developed with Craig Wright; and the Fox drama series Accused. He also produced the NBC science fiction thriller Awake.

== Life and career ==
Gordon was born to a Reform Jewish family in Queens, New York City and graduated from Roslyn High School. After graduating from Princeton with a major in creative writing in 1984, Gordon came to Los Angeles with fellow filmmaker Alex Gansa to pursue a career in writing for television. Both broke into the industry with single episodes of ABC's Spenser: For Hire. Their Spenser work turned industry heads, and the pair joined the series Beauty and the Beast as staff writers, and were later named producers.

In 1990, the Gansa-Gordon team was signed to a two-year deal with Witt-Thomas Productions, during which they produced several pilots. One was an ABC project called Country Estates, which caught the attention of producer Chris Carter.

Soon after, Carter invited Gordon and Gansa to join The X-Files as supervising producers; Gordon wrote or co-wrote several scripts each season, before departing from the series in 1997 to pursue other projects.

After co-writing one episode of Buffy the Vampire Slayer, Gordon created his own show, the short-lived Strange World in 1999. Strange World went to seed 13 episodes in, but Gordon and Strange World writer Tim Minear's services were quickly snapped up by Buffy creator Joss Whedon on another project: Angel. After two years with Angel, Gordon jumped ship in 2001 for FOX's successful 24, where he would write several episodes in Seasons 1 & 2, then crafted the entire story arcs for Seasons 3 and 4. Gordon temporarily left 24 in the middle of the 2004 season to re-join Minear, this time as co-creator of another FOX series, The Inside. Despite The Inside's cancellation and short run, talk circulated of including the two Minear-Gordon series, Strange World and The Inside, on a special DVD set sometime in 2006.

Beginning in 2006, Gordon became 24's showrunner, a title he held through its final season. The successful deal led up with his continuing deal at Fox. That same year, he was made partner with 24 creators Joel Surnow and Robert Cochran at Real Time Productions to develop projects, until the duo quit in 2008. In 2019, after a stint at Fox through Teakwood Lane Productions, he signed a deal with Sony.

Gordon is also the author of the Gideon Davis novels.

=== Homeland ===
In 2010, after finishing 24, Gordon began co-developing (along with Gideon Raff and Alex Gansa) the thriller Homeland for Showtime. Based on the Israeli series Prisoners of War, it centers on a woman (Claire Danes) who works for the CIA and is convinced a recently returned American prisoner of war (Damian Lewis) has been turned by al-Qaeda. The show premiered Sunday, October 2, 2011, at 10/9 central. It has been met with major critical acclaim and maintained a steady viewership rating throughout its first season. Showtime premiered its fourth season on October 5, 2014.

In 2012, he won the Primetime Emmy Award for Outstanding Writing for a Drama Series for writing the "Pilot" of Homeland and the series itself won the Primetime Emmy Award for Outstanding Drama Series.

=== Awake ===
In 2011, Gordon signed on to NBC's new Kyle Killen fantasy pilot Awake as an executive producer. When NBC picked the project up to series status, Gordon added writer and showrunner to his occupational duties on the show. The series only ran from March 1 to May 24, 2012, before it was cancelled.

=== Second Chance ===
In 2015, Gordon was executive producer on the horror-drama series Second Chance for Fox Television Network. The pilot for Second Chance is based on a script written by Rand Ravich, who also worked as an executive producer on the series.

=== Accused ===
In May 2021, Fox ordered an American adaptation of Accused, the International Emmy-winning British series and it was announced that Gordon would act as executive producer and show-runner. It will be co-produced between Sony Pictures Television, All3Media America and Fox Entertainment and scheduled to premiere in the 2022–23 television season. Alex Gansa and David Shore will serve as co-executive producers. It premiered on January 22, 2023.

== Novels ==
- Gideon's War (also published in the UK as The Obelisk) - 2011
- Hard Target (also published in the UK as The Chamber) - 2012
