= Evan Katz =

American television producer

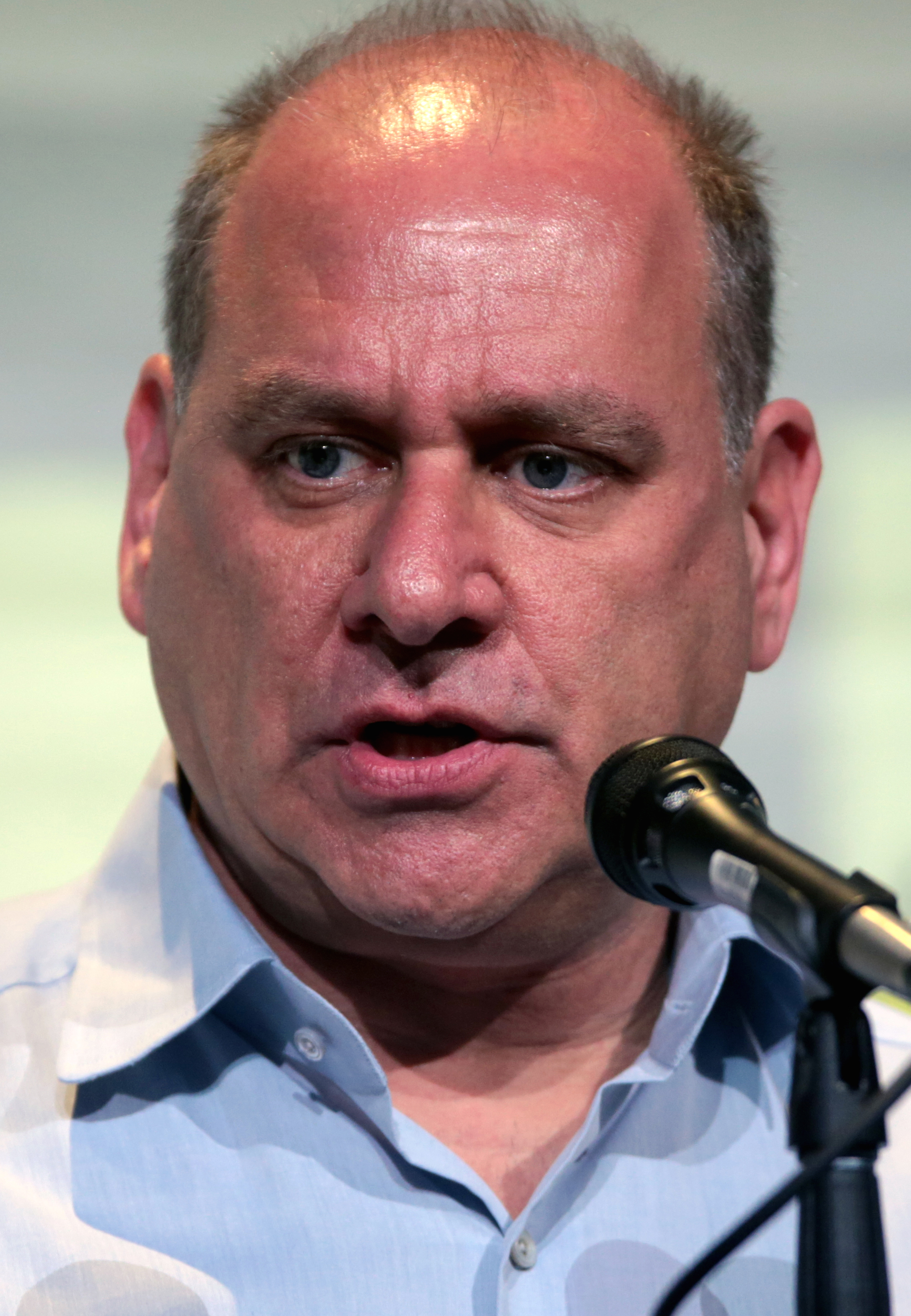
- Katz at the 2016 San Diego Comic-Con
- Occupations: Writer, producer
- Years active: 1990-present

Evan Katz is an American television writer and television producer. He is best known for his work as executive producer of the television series 24.

== Career ==
Katz was an executive producer of the television series 24, which aired original episodes on the Fox Network from 2001 to 2010. Prior to his work on 24 he created, wrote, and executive produced the American sci-fi/comedy television series Special Unit 2, which aired original episodes for two seasons on UPN from April 2001 through February 2002. In May 2010, Katz was signed as showrunner and executive producer for the NBC series The Event.

== Awards ==
He won a 2006 Primetime Emmy Award for Outstanding Drama Series (for 24) and has been nominated for two additional Emmy Awards. Also for 24, he won the Writers Guild of America Award for Best Screenplay – Episodic Drama for the season 2 episode "Day 2: 7:00 p.m. – 8:00 p.m.".

== Influences ==
Katz is a fan of the Australian alternative rock group The Go-Betweens. He named the McLennan-Forster corporation featured in the fourth season of 24 after the group's central members, Robert Forster and Grant McLennan.

== Education and personal life ==
He is a graduate of Wesleyan University and the University of Southern California. His wife, Lisa Miller Katz, was the casting director on Everybody Loves Raymond.
