= Anil Kapoor filmography =

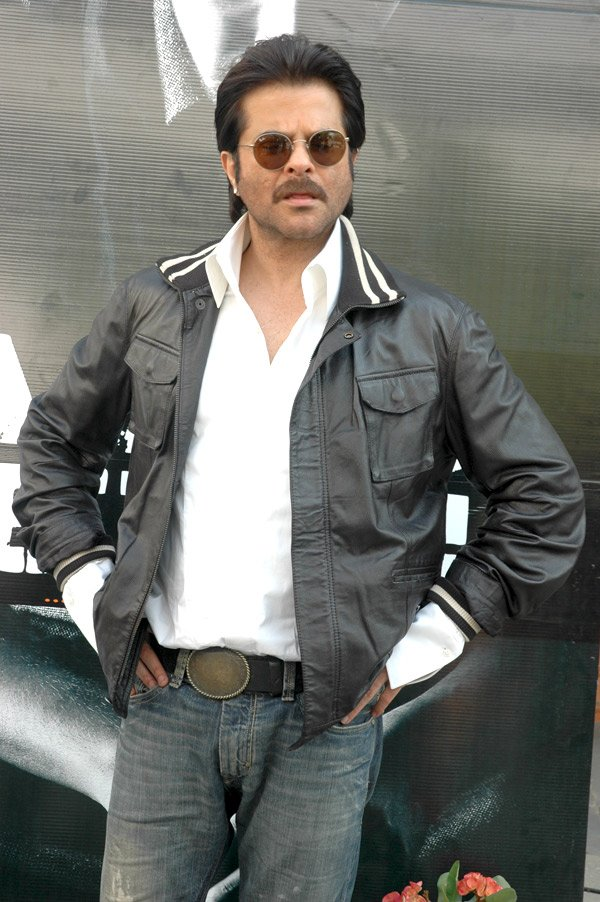
Kapoor at the audio release of Black N White

Anil Kapoor is an Indian actor and producer and has appeared in more than 138 Hindi films, as well as international films and television series. His career has spanned over 47 years as an actor, and as a producer since 2005.

Kapoor appeared in his first film with a small role in the Umesh Mehra's romance Hamare Tumhare (1979). He made his debut film and then starred as a lead actor in the 1980 Telugu film, Vamsa Vruksham directed by Bapu. He was supposed to be launched in Hindi with Kahan Kahan Se Guzar Gaya, but the film was delayed. He then made his Kannada film debut with Mani Ratnam's Pallavi Anu Pallavi (1983). Anil Kapoor got recognition for his lead role in the film "Woh Saat Din" as Prem Partap Patiaale Waale in 1983. He received his first Filmfare Award, in the Best Supporting Actor category, for his role in Yash Chopra's Mashaal (1984).

Kapoor earned his first Filmfare Best Actor Award for his performance in N. Chandra's Tezaab (1988) and another for his performance in Indra Kumar's Beta (1992). Kapoor subsequently starred in many other critically and commercially successful films, including Meri Jung (1985), Karma (1986), Janbaaz (1986), Aap Ke Saath (1986),

Mr. India (1987), Ghar Ho To Aisa (1990), Awaargi (1990), Lamhe (1991), Benaam Badsha (1991), and Virasat (1997), for which he won the Filmfare Critics Award for Best Actor; Taal (1999), for which he won his second Filmfare Best Supporting Actor Award; Pukar (2000), which earned him a National Film Award for Best Actor; No Entry (2005) and Dil Dhadakne Do (2015) for which he won his third Filmfare Best Supporting Actor Award. Kapoor has starred in more than a 100 films.

Kapoor's first role in an international film was in Danny Boyle's Academy Award-winning film Slumdog Millionaire, for which he shared the Screen Actors Guild Award for Outstanding Performance by a Cast in a Motion Picture. His performance in the eighth season of the action series 24 generated rave reviews from the American press. Globally, Kapoor is one of the most recognized Indian film actors.

== Films ==
Key
†	Denotes films that have not yet been released

=== As actor ===
Year	Title	Role	Notes
1971	Tu Payal Mein Geet	Young Shashi Kapoor	Unreleased
1979	Hamare Tumhare	Vipin Bhope	
1980	Vamsa Vruksham	Shesh	Telugu film
1980	Ek Baar Kaho	Student	
1980	Hum Paanch	Aadesh	
1981	Kahan Kahan Se Guzar Gaya	Ravi	
1982	Shakti	Ravi Kumar	
1983	Pallavi Anu Pallavi	Vijay	Kannada film
1983	Rachna	Raj Malhotra	
1983	Woh Saat Din	Prem Pratap Patialawale	
1984	Mashaal	Raja	Won–Filmfare Award for Best Supporting Actor
1984	Andar Baahar	Raja	
1984	Laila	Kumar Deshraj Singh	
1984	Love Marriage	Rajesh	
1985	Saaheb	Sunil Sharma (Saaheb)	
1985	Yudh	Avinash Goel/ Junior	Dual role
1985	Mohabbat	Shekhar Basu	
1985	Meri Jung	Arun Verma	Nominated–Filmfare Award for Best Actor
1986	Chameli Ki Shaadi	Charandas Sood	
1986	Aap Ke Saath	Vimal Roy	
1986	Janbaaz	Amar Singhania	
1986	Pyar Kiya Hai Pyar Karenge	Anand Mhatre	
1986	Karma	Gyaneshwar Singh/ Johnny	
1986	Insaaf Ki Awaaz	Ravi Kumar	
1987	Itihaas	Vijay Singhal	
1987	Mr. India	Arun Verma/Mr. India	
1987	Hifazat	Rajkumar/Ram Kumar Saini	
1987	Thikana	Ravi Mehra	
1988	Kasam	Inspector Krishna	
1988	Ram-Avtar	Avtar	
1988	Vijay	Arjun Thakur	
1988	Sone Pe Suhaaga	Joginder/Ravi Kumar	
1988	Tezaab	Mahesh Deshmukh (Munna)	Won–Filmfare Award for Best Actor
1988	Inteqam	Vikram Dixit (Vicky)	
1988	Akarshan	Himself	Cameo appearance
1989	Ram Lakhan	Lakhan Pratap Singh	Nominated–Filmfare Award for Best Actor
1989	Joshilaay	Karan	
1989	Eeshwar	Ishwarchand	Nominated–Filmfare Award for Best Actor
1989	Rakhwala	Vikram Bose	
1989	Abhimanyu	Abhimanyu /Abdul/ Mannu	
1989	Aag Se Khelenge	Inspector Raja/Ravi Saxena	
1989	Kala Bazaar	Vijay Jain	
1989	Parinda	Karan Choudhry	
1989	Hamaal De Dhamaal	Cameo	Marathi film
1990	Awaargi	Azad Khan	
1990	Kishen Kanhaiya	Kishen & Kanhaiya	Double role
1990	Ghar Ho To Aisa	Amar Jhaveri	
1990	Jeevan Ek Sangharsh	Karan Bhasin	
1990	Amba	Suraj (Sarju)	
1990	Jamai Raja	Raja Joshi	
1991	Jigarwala	Amar Singh	
1991	Benaam Badsha	Deepak Garewal	
1991	Pratikar	Krishna Srivastav	
1991	Lamhe	Viren/ Kunwar saab	Nominated–Filmfare Award for Best Actor
1992	Beta	Raju	Won–Filmfare Award for Best Actor
1992	Zindagi Ek Jua	Harry	
1992	Humlaa	Shiva Pandya	
1992	Khel	Devdas/ Arun Kumar	
1992	Aasmaan Se Gira	Himself	
1992	Heer Ranjha	Deedho/Ranjha	
1992	Apradhi	Shiva Mukund	
1993	Roop Ki Rani Choron Ka Raja	Ramesh "Romeo"	
1993	Gurudev	Gaurav "Guru" Ajmera	
1994	Laadla	Raj "Raju" Verma	
1994	Andaz	Ajay Jagpathi	
1994	1942: A Love Story	Nirendra "Naren" Singh	Nominated–Filmfare Award for Best Actor
1994	Mr. Azaad	Azaad Bakshi	
1995	Trimurti	Anand Singh/Sikander	Nominated–Filmfare Award for Best Supporting Actor
1996	Rajkumar	Rajkumar Raina	
1996	Loafer	Ravi Kumar Chawda	
1996	Mr. Bechara	Anand Verma	
1997	Judaai	Raj Verma	
1997	Virasat	Shakti Thakur	Won–Filmfare Critics Award for Best Actor
1997	Virasat	Shakti Thakur	Nominated–Filmfare Award for Best Actor
1997	Deewana Mastana	Raja	
1997	Chandralekha	Cameo	Malayalam film
1998	Kabhi Na Kabhi	Rajeshwar "Raja" Utekar	
1998	Gharwali Baharwali	Arun Sharma	
1998	Jhooth Bole Kauwa Kaate	Shanker Sharma/ Ramanuj	
1999	Hum Aapke Dil Mein Rehte Hain	Vijay Swaminandan	
1999	Biwi No.1	Dr. Lakhan Khurana	Nominated–Filmfare Award for Best Comedian
1999	Mann	Raj	Special appearance
1999	Taal	Vikrant Kapoor	Won–Filmfare Award for Best Supporting Actor
2000	Bulandi	Dada Thakur/ Arjun	Dual role
2000	Pukar	Major Jaidev Rajvansh	Won–National Film Award for Best Actor
2000	Pukar	Major Jaidev Rajvansh	Nominated–Filmfare Award for Best Actor
2000	Hamara Dil Aapke Paas Hai	Avinash Patel	
2000	Karobaar: The Business of Love	Rajiv Soni	
2001	Lajja	Raveen "Raju" Naagar	
2001	Nayak	Shivaji Rao	Nominated–Filmfare Award for Best Actor
2002	Badhaai Ho Badhaai	Raja Saxena	
2002	Om Jai Jagadish	Om Batra	
2002	Rishtey	Suraj Singh	
2003	Armaan	Dr. Akash Sinha	
2003	Calcutta Mail	Avinash Tripathi	
2004	Musafir	Lucky Jaiswal	
2005	Bewafaa	Aditya "Adi" Sahai	
2005	My Wife's Murder	Ravi Patwardhan	
2005	No Entry	Kishan Khanna	Nominated–Filmfare Award for Best Comedian
2005	Chocolate	Advocate Krishan Pundit	
2006	Humko Deewana Kar Gaye	Karan Oberoi	
2006	Darna Zaroori Hai	Karan Chopra	Segment: Ghostly Audition
2007	Salaam-e-Ishq: A Tribute To Love	Vinay Nandan	
2007	Welcome	Sagar Pandey/Majnu Bhai	Nominated–Filmfare Award for Best Supporting Actor
2008	Black & White	Rajan Mathur	
2008	Race	Inspector Robert D'Costa (RD)	
2008	Tashan	Lakhan Singh Ballebaaz	
2008	Yuvvraaj	Gyanesh Yuvvraaj Singh	
2008	My Name is Anthony Gonsalves	Cameo	
2008	Slumdog Millionaire	Prem Kumar	English film
2008	Slumdog Millionaire	Prem Kumar	Won–Screen Actors Guild Award for Outstanding Performance by a Cast in a Motion Picture
2009	Short Kut	Cameo	
2009	Wanted	Cameo	
2010	No Problem	Inspector Arjun Singh	
2010	Tees Maar Khan	Cameo	
2011	Mission: Impossible – Ghost Protocol	Brijnath Khera	English film
2012	Tezz	Arjun Khanna	
2013	Race 2	Inspector Robert D'Costa (RD)	
2013	Shootout at Wadala	Inspector Affaq Bhagra	
2013	Bombay Talkies	Cameo	Special appearance in the song "Apna Bombay Talkies"
2013	Mahabharat 3D Film	Karna (voice-over)	
2015	Dil Dhadakne Do	Kamal Mehra	Won–Filmfare Award for Best Supporting Actor
2015	Welcome Back	Sagar Pandey/Majnu Bhai	
2017	Mubarakan	Kartar Singh Bajwa	
2018	Race 3	Shamsher Singh	
2018	Fanney Khan	Prashant Kumar Sharma / Fanney Khan	
2018	Mowgli: Legend of the Jungle	Baloo (voice)	Hindi dubbed version
2019	Ek Ladki Ko Dekha Toh Aisa Laga	Balbir Chaudhary	
2019	Total Dhamaal	Avinash Patel	
2019	The Zoya Factor	AK	Special appearance
2019	Pagalpanti	WiFi Bhai	
2020	Malang	Inspector Anjaney Agashe	
2020	AK vs AK	Anil Kapoor	Netflix film
2022	Thar	Surekha Singh	Netflix film
2022	Jug Jugg Jeeyo	Bheem Saini	
2023	Thank You for Coming	Professor	Special appearance
2023	Animal	Balbir Singh / Kailash	Double role
2024	Fighter	Rakesh "Rocky" Jai Singh	
2024	Savi	Joydeep Paul	
2025	War 2	Lt. Col. Vikrant Kaul	
2026	Subedaar	Subedaar Arjun Maurya	
2026	Alpha	Lt. Col. Vikrant Kaul	
2026	King †	TBA	Filming
2027	Dragon †	Chief Raghuveer Rathod	Telugu film; Filming

=== As producer ===
Anil Kapoor produced films under his banner Anil Kapoor Films & Communication Network.

Year	Title	Notes
2002	Badhaai Ho Badhaai	
2005	My Wife's Murder	
2007	Gandhi, My Father	
2009	Short Kut	
2010	Aisha	
2010	No Problem	
2014	Khoobsurat	
2018	Veere Di Wedding	
2018	Fanney Khan	
2022	Thar	
2023	Thank You for Coming	
2024	Crew	
2026	Subedaar	

== Television ==
Key
†	Denotes television productions that have not yet been released

List of television credits
Year	Title	Role	Notes
2010	24	Kamistan President Omar Hassan	Series regular (season 8)
2013–2016	24	Jai Singh Rathore	Also producer
2016	Family Guy	Himself (Host of 'Who wants to be a millionaire')	For 1 episode "Road To India"
2017	Oasis	Vikram Danesh Roy	1 episode only
2023	The Night Manager	Shailendra Rungta	Remake of The Night Manager
2024	Bigg Boss OTT 3	Host	
2026	India Ke Top 1%	Host	
TBA	Family Business †	Jeh Davar	Netflix series
