= List of awards and nominations received by Anil Kapoor =

Anil Kapoor awards and nominations
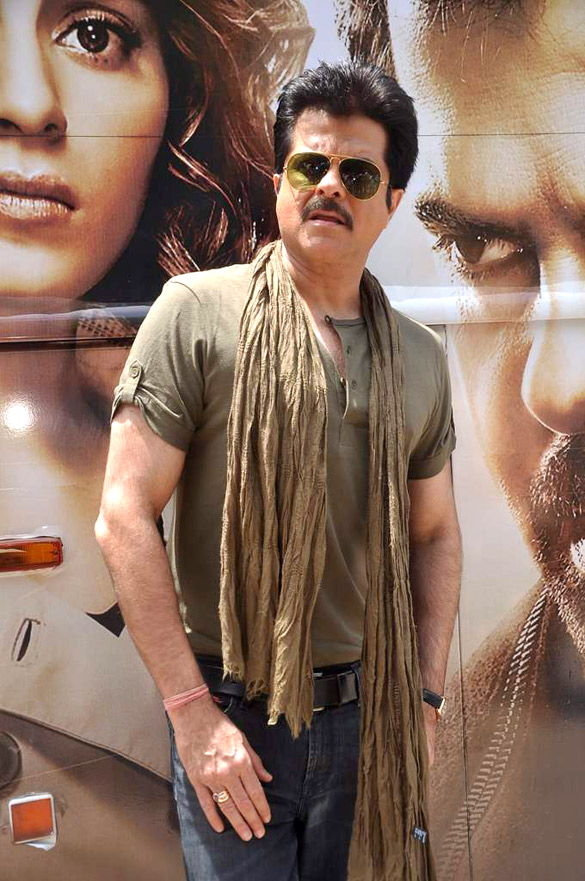
- Kapoor at a promotional event for Tezz in 2012
Awards and nominations
Award	Wins	Nominations
Filmfare Awards	7	10
Screen Awards	3	1
IIFA Awards	5	0
Zee Cine Awards	3	0
National Film Awards	2	0
Bollywood Movie Awards	1	0
Sansui Awards	1	1
Stardust Awards	4	0
Times of India Film Awards	1	0
Producers Guild Awards	1	0
Indian Television Academy Awards	2	0
Other awards	9	1

Totals (Note: Certain award groups do not simply award one winner. They acknowledge several different recipients, have runners-up, and have third place. Since this is a specific recognition and is different from losing an award, runner-up mentions are considered wins in this award tally. For simplification and to avoid errors, each award in this list has been presumed to have had a prior nomination.)
- Wins: 40
- Nominations: 13

Anil Kapoor (born 24 December 1956) is an Indian actor and film producer who has appeared in many Bollywood films and more recently international films. Kapoor's career has spanned for over 30 years as an actor, he turned into producer with his critically acclaimed film Gandhi, My Father (2007). His first role as a lead actor was in the Tollywood Telugu film Vamsa Vruksham (1980). He won his first Filmfare Award for Best Supporting Actor category, for his role in Yash Chopra's Mashaal (1984). Kapoor earned his first Filmfare Award for Best Actor for his performance in N. Chandra's Tezaab (1988) and later again for his performance in Indra Kumar's Beta (1992). He also starred in many other critically and commercially successful films, including Woh Saat Din (1983), Meri Jung (1985), Janbaaz (1986), Karma (1986), Mr. India (1987), Parinda (1989), Lamhe (1991), Virasat (1997) for which he won the Filmfare Award for Best Actor (Critics), Biwi No.1 (1999), Taal (1999) for which he won his second Filmfare Award for Best Supporting Actor, Pukar (2000) for which he won a National Film Award for Best Actor as well as No Entry (2005), Welcome (2007), Race (2008) and Race 2 (2013). He also received two Filmfare Awards for Best Supporting Actor for Dil Dhadakne Do (2015) and Jugjugg Jeeyo (2022).

== National Film Awards ==
Year	Category	Film	Result
2001	Best Actor	Pukar	Won
2009	Special Jury Award	Gandhi, My Father	Won

== Filmfare Awards ==
Year	Category	Film	Result
1985	Best Supporting Actor	Mashaal	Won
1986	Best Actor	Meri Jung	Nominated
1989	Best Actor	Tezaab	Won
1990	Best Actor	Eeshwar	Nominated
1992	Best Actor	Lamhe	Nominated
1993	Best Actor	Beta	Won
1995	Best Actor	1942: A Love Story	Nominated
1996	Best Supporting Actor	Trimurti	Nominated
1998	Best Actor	Virasat	Nominated
1998	Best Actor (Critics)	Virasat	Won
2000	Best Supporting Actor	Taal	Won
2000	Best Comedian	Biwi No.1	Nominated
2001	Best Actor	Pukar	Nominated
2006	Best Comedian	No Entry	Nominated
2008	Best Supporting Actor	Welcome	Nominated
2016	Best Supporting Actor	Dil Dhadakne Do	Won
2023	Best Supporting Actor	Jugjugg Jeeyo	Won
2024	Best Supporting Actor	Animal	Nominated

== IIFA Awards ==
Year	Category	Film	Result
2000	Best Supporting Actor	Taal	Won
2000	Best Comedian	Biwi No.1	Won
2006	IIFA Wall of Fame	For his contribution to Bollywood	Won
2010	Outstanding Achievement by an Indian Internationally	For his contribution to International Cinema	Won
2016	Best Supporting Actor	Dil Dhadakne Do	Won
2019	Best Supporting Actor	Race 3	Nominated

== Screen Awards ==
Year	Category	Film	Result
1998	Best Actor	Virasat	Won
2000	Best Supporting Actor	Taal	Won
2018	Best Comedian	Mubarakan	Nominated

== Zee Cine Awards ==
Year	Category	Film	Result
2000	Best Supporting Actor	Taal	Won
2008	Best Film (Critics)	Gandhi, My Father	Won
2018	Best Supporting Actor	Mubarakan	Won
2023	Best Supporting Actor	Jugjugg Jeeyo	Won

=== Bollywood Movie Awards ===
Year	Category	Film	Result
2001	Most Sensational Actor	Pukar	Won

== Sansui Awards ==
Year	Category	Film	Result
2001	Best Actor	Pukar	Nominated
2001	Best Actor (Jury)	Pukar	Won

== Screen Actors Guild Awards ==
Year	Category	Film	Result
2009	Outstanding Performance by a Cast in a Motion Picture	Slumdog Millionaire	Won

== Stardust Awards ==
Year	Category	Film	Result
2008	Hottest Film Producer	Gandhi, My Father	Won
2009	Special Award for being the first mainstream Indian actor to take India to Hollywood and winning Global Recognition	For his overall contribution	Won
2009	Best Actor in a Negative Role	Tashan	Won
2016	Best Supporting Actor	Dil Dhadakne Do	Won

== Times of India Film Awards ==
Year	Category	Film	Result
2016	Best Supporting Actor	Dil Dhadakne Do	Won

== Other Awards ==
Year	From	Award	Notes	Won
2008	Vodafone Comedy Honors	Performer with All Round Comic Excellence		Yes
2009	Apsara Awards	Best Actor in a Comic Role	Welcome	Yes
2010	AXN Action Awards	Lifetime Achievement Award		Yes
2012	GQ Award	Lifetime Achievement Award		Yes
2014	Indian Telly Awards	Best Actor in a Lead Role (Jury)	24	Yes
2014	Indian Television Academy Awards	Best Actor - Drama	24	Yes
2016	Indian Television Academy Awards	Best Actor - Drama	24 (Season 2)	Yes

2023

Ita Awards nominated for best villain in Night Manager

== Honours ==
Year	From	Award	Won/Honoured
1997	Government of Andhra Pradesh	Nata Kalaratna	Yes
2002	Government of Uttar Pradesh	Awadh Samman	Yes
2006	Brand Ambassador of South Africa	Appointed as global brand ambassador	Honoured
2009	Indian Film Festival of Los Angeles		Honoured
2009	Cairo International Film Festival		Honoured
2010	Tony Blair's Foundation	Selected to be one of the jury members	Honoured
2011	Government of Andhra Pradesh	Conferred with Lalitha Kala Samrat title	Honoured
2012	Teacher's Global Indian Achiever Award		Honoured
2015	Indian Film Festival of Melbourne, 2015.	Excellence in World Cinema Award	Honoured
2016	Government of Maharashtra	Raj Kapoor Special Contribution Award	Honoured

== See also ==
- List of accolades received by Dil Dhadakne Do
- List of accolades received by Slumdog Millionaire
