= Nandana Sen =

Indian-American actress

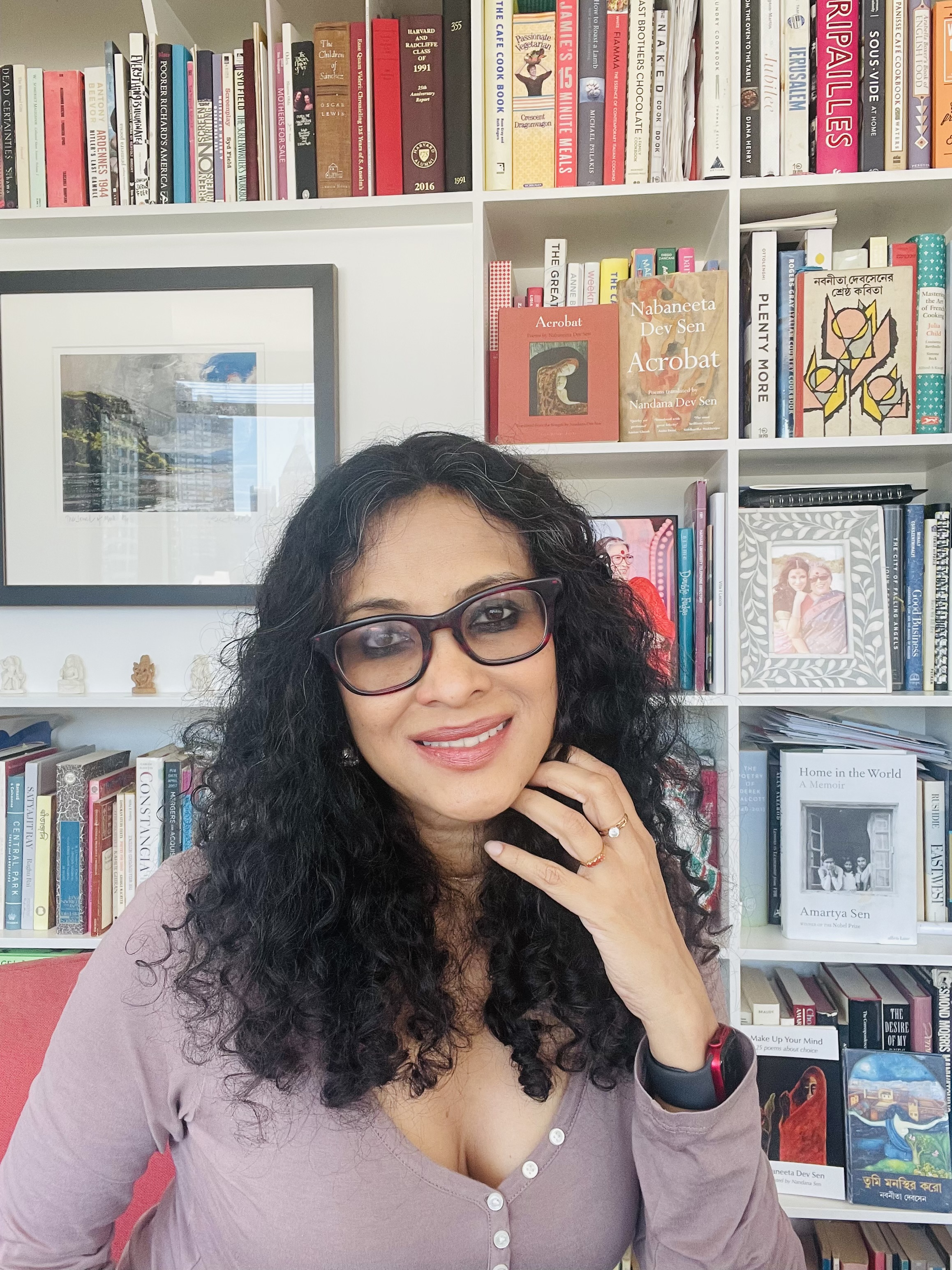
- Nandana Dev Sen in July 2022
- Born: Nandana Dev Sen; Calcutta, West Bengal, India (now Kolkata)
- Citizenship: United States
- Education: Harvard University (BA, MA)
- Occupations: Actress; activist; writer
- Years active: 1997–2014
- Organization(s): Ambassadorships in RAHI, Apne Aap Women Worldwide, Operation Smile, Save the Children India, UNICEF
- Spouse: John Makinson (m. 2013)
- Partner: Madhu Mantena (2002–2013)
- Children: 1
- Parent(s): Amartya Sen; Nabaneeta Dev Sen
- Family: Sen family

Nandana Dev Sen is an Indian-born American actress, screenwriter, children's author, and child-rights activist. Her first film role in Bollywood was Sanjay Leela Bhansali's Black (2005), starring Amitabh Bachchan and Rani Mukherjee, in which she played the role of Rani's 17-year-old younger sister.

After teaming up on a succession of projects with Indian directors including Ram Gopal Varma and Ketan Mehta, Sen signed for one of the principal roles in the jarring, terrorist-themed American drama The War Within (2005), which premiered at the Toronto International Film Festival and, in the process, began to cultivate a reputation for being drawn to offbeat, challenging and demanding roles, often with a social or political theme.

== Early life ==
Sen is the daughter of Nobel Laureate and Bharat Ratna economist Amartya Sen and Padma Shri awardee Nabanita Dev Sen. Nandana was born in New Delhi. Her elder sister Antara Dev Sen is a journalist. Nandana spent few years of her childhood in Delhi and London. After her parents separated, she and her sister moved to Kolkata with their mother Nabanita. After completing her schooling in Kolkata, she went to United States for further studies and completed her BA and Master's in English literature from Harvard University. Nandana Sen's first piece of writing was published when she was a child in the magazine Sandesh, selected by Satyajit Ray. She spent her formative years in various cities across Europe, India and America.

== Education ==
Nandana Sen studied literature at Harvard University, where she was awarded the Detur Prize in her first year for topping her class, and thereafter won both the John Harvard Scholarship and the Elizabeth Cary Agassiz Award for Academic Achievement of the Highest Distinction. As a Junior, she was elected early into the academic honor society Phi Beta Kappa. Subsequently, Sen studied Film Producing at the Peter Stark Producing Program at the USC Film School. She wrote and directed various short films, including her thesis film "Arranged Marriage" which was shown at multiple film festivals. As an actor, Nandana trained at the Lee Strasberg Theatre Institute, New York, as well as the Royal Academy of Dramatic Art, London.

== Professional life ==
=== Child rights ===
Along with acting in theatre and films internationally, Nandana also promotes the cause of child protection. Nandana, who is the Child Protection Ambassador for Save the Children India, was Smile Ambassador for the global children's NGO Operation Smile, UNICEF India's National Celebrity for Child Protection and against Gender Based Violence, and Cause Ambassador for RAHI (India's first organization to break the silence about child sexual abuse). She is a Director for the Women's Refuge Commission, New York, serving also on its Program and Advocacy Committee. She collaborates with the National Commission for Protection of Child Rights (NCPCR) as a Child Rights Expert and Juror for Public Hearings. Nandana has been actively fighting to stop the crisis of child trafficking in India, both with organizations such as the NCPCR and the Terre des hommes foundation as well as addressing this topic in cinema. She has been invited to speak on the cause of child protection in international conferences, including the Global Call to Action Summit for Child Survival and Development organized by USAID and the International Comprehensive Cleft Care Conference of 2013. Nandana Sen has combined her commitment to child rights with her acting work, including originating the role of the traumatized protagonist of the play "30 Days in September" (Prithvi Theatre) and the film "Chuppee/ The Silence" on Child Abuse (UNIFEM).

=== Cinema ===
Sen has starred in over 20 feature films from various countries and in various languages. Her portrayal of Sugandha in Rang Rasiya (2008) has been hailed by critics as "pitch-perfect", "superb", "divine, elegant, and enticing", "innocent and vulnerable", "fearless, uninhibited", "radiant in every frame", "poignant, lustrous", "stunning" and "as refined as it is bold". Sen's groundbreaking performance as artist Ravi Varma's muse in this historical romance on the religious censorship of art subsequently won her the prestigious Kalakar Award for Best Actress in 2015: in her acceptance speech, Nandana went on record saying that the award honours "the greater cause of free speech and expression, now under enormous threat everywhere, as shown by the horrifying Charlie Hebdo killings in Paris. The need to protect our creative freedom – whether we are actors or journalists, film-makers or novelists – is more urgent now than ever."

However, controversial acting choices, Best Actress Awards, and critical acclaim are not unique in Nandana Sen's unconventional career. Sen experienced her first taste of cinema acting while still a student when director Goutam Ghose tapped her to play the lead in his dark and disturbing psychodrama The Doll (Gudia) as one of the targets of a middle-age man's sexual obsession, which premiered at the Un Certain Regard section of the Cannes Film Festival. Sen was first seen on Indian screens as Rani Mukerji's younger sister in Sanjay Leela Bhasali's award-winning film Black. Sen's portrayal of a vulnerable teenager was not only critically appreciated but also earned her a nomination for Breakthrough Performance of the Year (Stardust Awards, 2005).

In the anti-war film Tango Charlie, Sen played the female lead opposite Ajay Devgan starring Sanjay Dutt and Bobby Deol and with Anil Kapoor in My Wife's Murder. Nandana followed this by signing lead roles opposite Salman Khan in the bilingual Hollywood-Bollywood film Marigold, and Vivek Oberoi in Prince, at the same time playing the protagonist in unconventional but acclaimed films such as Strangers and The Forest.

The British television series Sharpe increased her notability. The episode Sharpe’s Peril featured Sen in a pivotal role. In 2007, Sen signed on to portray a young rebellious woman fleeing from law authorities in director Shamim Sarif's lesbian-themed period drama The World Unseen. In 2010, Nandana starred in the Bengali super-hit Autograph, for which she was awarded the TeleCine Award for Best Actress and the Reliance BIG Bangla Rising Star Award.

In theatre as in film, Sen has often played an artist's muse and has been critically appreciated each time, including the off-Broadway production "Modigliani", the Bengali blockbuster "Autograph", and her latest release, "Rang Rasiya". A favorite cover-girl of leading magazines for women as well as men, such as Femina, Savvy, FHM, Man's World and Maxim, Sen is known as much for her performances as for being comfortable with her sexuality and for speaking her mind: "My body is as much a part of my humanity as my brain, my morals, and my heart, and I will never be ashamed of expressing it with the dignity and self-respect it deserves."

=== Writing ===
Sen, whose professional choices have included a tenure as a literary editor at Houghton Mifflin Company, and as Princess Jasmine in Disneyland, is also a children's book author, a screenwriter, a maker of short films, and a published writer in multiple genres, including poetry, narrative non-fiction, and Op Eds. She has authored six children's books, In My Heart (Penguin Random House India, 2019), The Monkey Who Wanted to Fly (Italian: La scimmietta che voleva volare, Fetrinelli Kids, 2018), Talky Tumble of Jumble Farm (Penguin Random House India, 2017), Not Yet! (Tulika Books, 2017), Mambi and the Forest Fire (Puffin, 2016), and Kangaroo Kisses (Otter-Barry Books, 2016). In addition, she has translated and edited a bilingual collection of Bengali poetry, Make Up Your Mind: 25 Poems About Choice (iUniverse, 2013).. In 2021, Acrobat (Archipelago Books), a collection of her mother's poems translated from the Bengali into English, was published. Sen also writes a fiction series for The Wire entitled Youthquake. Sen's first original screenplay to be made into a film was Forever, funded by Telefilm Canada. She was commissioned by Divani Films to adapt R.K. Narayan’s novel Waiting For the Mahatma into a film script, and by Big Bang Company to write an original script focusing on a father-daughter relationship. Currently Nandana is completing the next book in her bestselling Mambi the Marvel series. She is also working on a multigenerational memoir entitled Mother Tongues, which grew from her essays "Shamelessly Female",. , "Every Word a Lifelong Quest" (Lithub, 2021) and "Letter to Ma" (The Ink, 2021)

== Personal life ==
Sen married John Makinson, Chairman of Penguin Random House, in June 2013. The couple adopted a young Bengali girl in 2018. She was previously in a relationship with Indian film producer, Madhu Mantena, for over a decade.

== Filmography ==
| Year | Film | Role | Language | Notes |
|---|---|---|---|---|
| 1997 | The Doll / Gudia | Rosemary Braganza / Urvashi | Hindi | credited as Nandana Dev Sen |
| 1999 | Branchie | Eugenia | Italian | |
| 1999 | Forever | Nadia | English | Short feature |
| 2000 | Seducing Maarya | Maarya | English | |
| 2002 | Bokshu – The Myth | Rati | English | Indian English film |
| 2005 | The War Within | Duri Choudhury | English | |
| 2005 | My Wife's Murder | Reena Wadhwa | Hindi | |
| 2005 | Tango Charlie | Shyamoli | Hindi | |
| 2005 | Black | Sarah McNally | Hindi | |
| 2007 | The World Unseen | Rehmat | English | |
| 2007 | Strangers | Preeti | English / Hindi | |
| 2007 | Marigold | Jaanvi | English / Hindi | |
| 2008 | Sharpe's Peril | Maharani Padmini | English | British TV Movie |
| 2008 | Rang Rasiya | Sugandha | Hindi | |
| 2009 | Kaler Rakhal | | Bengali | |
| 2009 | Perfect Mismatch | Neha | English | |
| 2010 | Autograph | Srinandita | Bengali | |
| 2010 | Prince | Serena | Hindi | |
| 2010 | Jhootha Hi Sahi | Suhana Malik | Hindi | |
| 2012 | The Forest | Radha | English / Hindi | |
