= Madhyanam Hathya =

Madhyanam Hatya
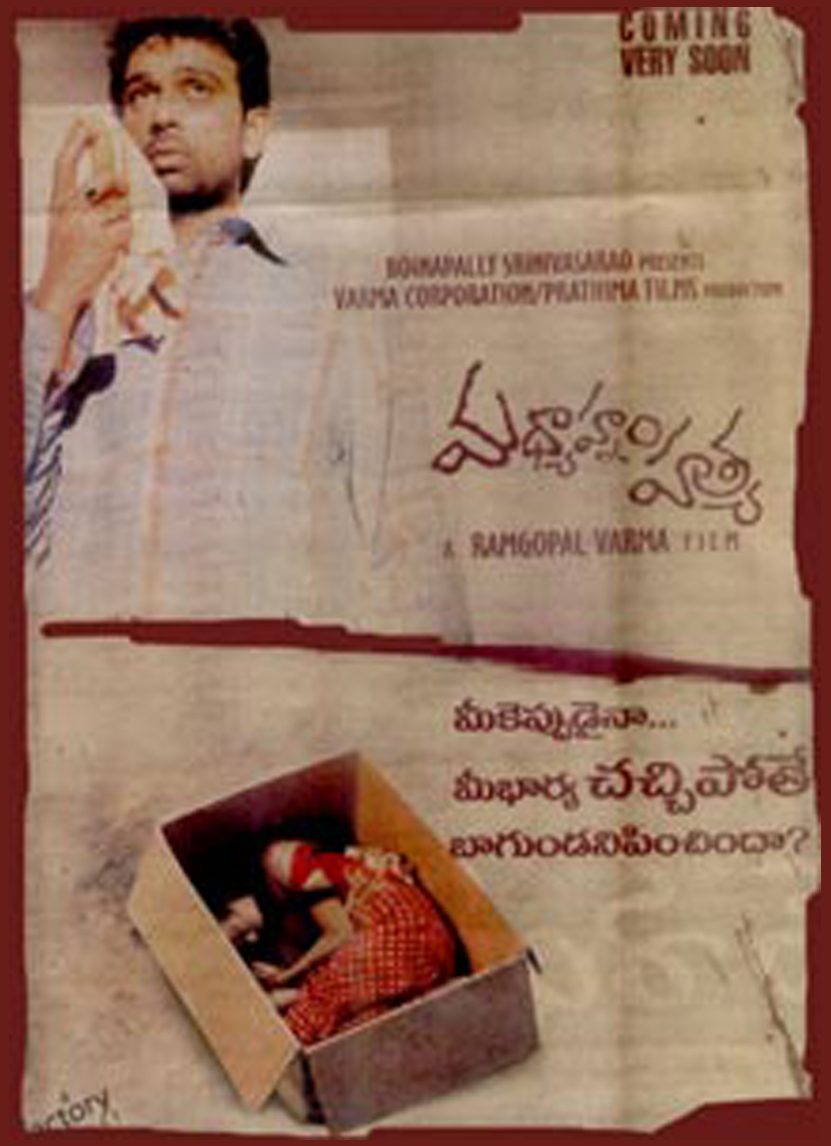
- Theatrical release poster
- Directed by: Ram Gopal Varma
- Written by: Atul Sabharwal
- Produced by: Varma Corporation
- Starring: J. D. Chakravarthy; Aamani; Priyanka Kothari; Bhanuchander
- Cinematography: Chota K. Naidu
- Edited by: Bhanodaya
- Music by: Shailender Swapnil
- Release date: 3 September 2004
- Running time: 103 min
- Country: India
- Language: Telugu

Madhyanam Hathya (English : Afternoon Murder) is a 2004 Telugu language Indian crime thriller film directed by Ram Gopal Varma, with cinematography by Chota K. Naidu. The films seems to closely follow the story of Horace William Manton, the main accused in the Luton Sack Murder case. The soundtrack of the film was arranged by Shailendra Swapnil. It was remade in Hindi as My Wife's Murder (2005) starring Anil Kapoor and Suchitra Krishnamoorthi.

== Plot ==
A police inspector (Bhanuchander) is assigned to investigate the case of the dead woman whose body is recovered from a lake. The police inspector checks if this matter can be linked with a missing person's report filed by film editor Ravi Kumar (J. D. Chakravarthy) and his father-in-law. The dead woman is identified as Lakshmi (Aamani), Ravi's nagging and abusive wife, whom Ravi killed and stuffed in a carton before dumps the box into a river on the city's outskirts.

According to Ravi, Lakshmi had left their home to visit her parents. When she had not arrived at their house 24 hours later, he himself had gone to their house, and on not being able to locate her, had accompanied his father-in-law to the nearest police station and filed a report as she is missing. The Inspector concludes that Lakshmi was waylaid on her way to her parents' house by unknown person(s), beaten, and her body left in the pond. But this case puzzles him, as there was no apparent motive for unknown person(s) to waylay her, as no money was taken, and her body does not shown signs of sexual assault. Taking these facts into consideration, he starts to suspect Ravi. Ravi's assistant (Priyanka Kothari) tries to help Ravi. However, her involvement makes matters worse. The movie then takes the audience through thrilling tale of how Ravi emerges from this matter and truth behind Lakshmi's murder.

== Cast ==
- J. D. Chakravarthy as Ravi Kumar
- Aamani as Sri Lakshmi
- Priyanka Kothari as Nikita
- Venkat as Rohit, Nikita's boyfriend
- Bhanuchander as Police Inspector
- Raghunatha Reddy
- Narsing Yadav
- Brahmaji

== Production ==
The film began production in 2001 as Akarshana., Earlier this film was directed by Indraganti Mohan Krishna who actually becomes his debut film but Ram Gopal Varma who doesn't liked his approach after watching the film which focused more on guilt ridden for his actions by the protagonist. Later, he completely canceled the film and remade under his direction. Though Varma didn't criticize his making of film, and he takes the blame on himself, Mohan Krishna said in one of his interviews.

== Controversy ==
The tagline featured in the film's poster landed in controversy after women's organisation felt it may trigger men to commit violence against women and demanded a ban on the film.

== Reception ==
A critic from Sify wrote that "Though the script is credited to Ramu, it is not well crafted and the suspense element is missing. There are no songs and the lead actors like Chakravarthy, Aamni and Priyanka are first class. The chase in the climax has been well- shot by Horseman Babu. On the whole the film is dark and dreary".
