= Radha Kalyanam (1981 film) =

- Theatrical release poster
- Directed by: Bapu
- Screenplay by: Mullapudi Venkata Ramana
- Based on: Andha 7 Naatkal by K. Bhagyaraj
- Starring: Chandra Mohan; Radhika; Sarath Babu
- Music by: K. V. Mahadevan
- Production company: Saradhi Studios
- Release date: 3 December 1981
- Country: India
- Language: Telugu

Radha Kalyanam (transl. Radha's wedding) is a 1981 Indian Telugu-language romantic drama film written by Mullapudi Venkata Ramana and directed by Bapu It is a remake of the Tamil film Andha 7 Naatkal (1981) directed by K. Bhagyaraj. The film stars Chandra Mohan, Radhika and Sarath Babu. It was released on 3 December 1981. Bapu went on to direct the Hindi version titled Woh Saat Din in 1983.

== Plot ==
The movie is a triangle love story between the lover, the heroine and her husband. Radha (Radhika) is a typical girl from a lower-middle-class family. She falls deeply in love with the new tenant upstairs, Palghat Madhavan (Chandramohan). Madhavan aspires to be a great music director, but struggles to get by. He is attracted to Radha.

Dr. Anand (Sarath Babu), a widower, is forced to marry Radha to fulfill the wish of his dying mother. He fully intends to keep his promise of returning Radha to her rightful owner and partner, Madhavan, after hearing Radha's reason behind attempting suicide on their first night. Events lead to conflict in her mind between the husband and lover. Whom should Radha choose and why?

== Cast ==
- Chandra Mohan as Palghat Madhavan
- Radhika as Radha
- Sarath Babu as Dr. Anand
- Kanta Rao
- Raavi Kondala Rao
- Pushpalata
- Sakshi Ranga Rao
- Radhabai
- Master Haja Sheriff as Gopi

== Production ==
Bhagyaraj's then wife Praveena initially wanted him to reprise his role from the original film, but he decided against doing so due to his lack of fluency in Telugu; the role went to Chandra Mohan.

== Soundtrack ==
The music was composed by K. V. Mahadevan.

- "Bangaru Bala Pichuka" -
- "Chetiki Gajulla" – S. P. Balasubrahmanyam, Jyothirmayi
- "Kalanaina Kshanamaina" - P, Susheela, S. P. Balasubrahmanyam
- "Palaghat Madhavan" -
- "Yemmogudo" -
- "chittikeyave chinadaa" - P. Susheela, S.P. Balasubrahmanyam
- "chittikeya" - P. Susheela, S.P. Balasubrahmanyam
