= John Makinson =

British businessman

John Makinson CBE
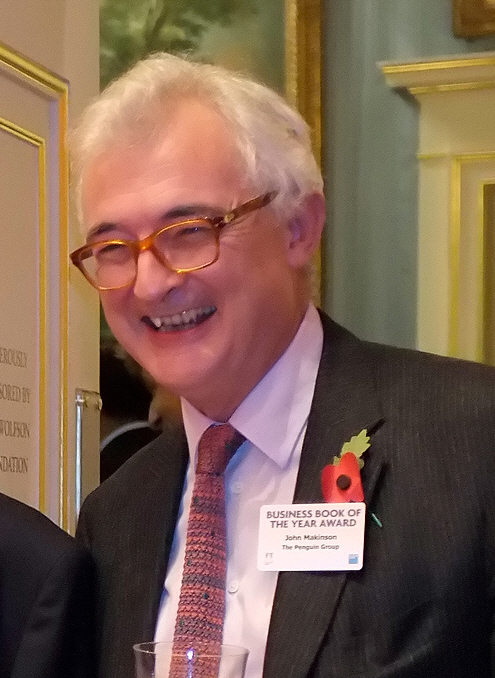
- Makinson on 3 November 2011
- Born: 10 October 1954 (age 71)
- Education: Repton School
- Alma mater: University of Cambridge
- Occupation: Businessman
- Spouse: Nandana Sen

John Makinson CBE (born 10 October 1954) is the Chairman of Kano, a London-based computing company that makes DIY computer and coding kits. He formerly served as chairman of the international publishing company Penguin Random House. He was chairman of The National Theatre from 2010 to 2016. He is a Board member of Harvard University Press and a Director of Mercy Corps, an international humanitarian organisation. In October 2024, he was appointed Chair of the Board of Bradford Literature Festival.

== Biography ==
After being educated at Repton School and completing his degree at Cambridge University, John Makinson started working as a journalist, first at Reuters and then at the Financial Times, where he edited the influential "Lex" column. From there he moved to Saatchi and Saatchi's US holding company, before co-founding Makinson Cowell, a specialist independent financial consultancy firm. After five years, he returned to the Financial Times to become its managing director, before accepting a job as the Pearson Group finance director, where he worked until moving to the Penguin Group, a subsidiary of the Pearson Group. He was Chairman and CEO of Penguin Group (worldwide) from 2002 to 2013.

He was a co-chair of the International Rescue Committee, a humanitarian organisation, for many years. He was also Chairman of the National Theatre from 2010 to 2016.

He is married to actor and activist Nandana Sen, daughter of Nobel Laureate Amartya Sen and Padmashri-awardee Nabaneeta Dev Sen.

He has used his knowledge of business to help compile a report for the British government, called Incentives for Change, and received a CBE in 2001 for his services to public sector productivity. He was also photographed by Harry Borden for the National Portrait Gallery in Britain.
