= Andha 7 Naatkal =

1981 Indian film by K. Bhagyaraj

- Theatrical release poster
- Directed by: K. Bhagyaraj
- Written by: K. Bhagyaraj
- Produced by: P. S. Jayaraman; M. Nachiappan
- Starring: K. Bhagyaraj; Rajesh; Ambika
- Cinematography: P. Ganesh Pandian
- Edited by: R. Bhaskaran
- Music by: M. S. Viswanathan
- Production companies: Srini Creations; Sathya Jyothi Films (presents)
- Release date: 26 October 1981
- Running time: 145 minutes
- Country: India
- Language: Tamil

Andha 7 Naatkal (pronounced [an̪ða eːɻu n̪aːʈkaɭ] transl. Those seven days) is a 1981 Indian Tamil-language romantic drama film written and directed by K. Bhagyaraj. The film stars Bhagyaraj, Rajesh and Ambika, with Kallapetti Singaram and Master Haja Sheriff in supporting roles. It revolves around a woman (Ambika) who is forced into an arranged marriage with a widower (Rajesh), but still longs for her first love (Bhagyaraj).

The story of Andha 7 Naatkal was inspired by the life of the comedian J. P. Chandrababu; his marriage had failed after his wife revealed to him that she was in love with someone else. The film was produced by P. S. Jayaraman and M. Nachiappan for Srini Creations and presented by Sathya Jyothi Films. The music was composed by M. S. Viswanathan, cinematography was handled by P. Ganesh Pandian, and editing by R. Bhaskaran.

Andha 7 Naatkal was released on 26 October 1981, Diwali day. The film was a commercial success, and Bhaskaran won the Tamil Nadu State Film Award for Best Editor. It became a trendsetter in Tamil cinema for highlighting the importance of traditional values and their relevance in society. The film was remade in Telugu as Radha Kalyanam (1981), in Hindi as Woh Saat Din (1983), and in Kannada as Love Maadi Nodu (1989).

== Plot ==
Vasanthi is marrying Anand, a doctor who already has a child from his previous marriage. As soon as they return home from the temple, Vasanthi attempts suicide. Anand saves her and Vasanthi reveals her past.

Palakkad Madhavan is a naïve and aspiring music director. His assistant Gopi is a dholak player. Arriving in Madras, looking for a chance in music direction, they rent a thatched room on the terrace of the house of Vasanthi. Madhavan commences his hunt for a chance in films, but does not succeed and struggles in penury. Madhavan's talents impress Vasanthi and soon she falls in love with him. However, Madhavan is reluctant and avoids her as he is still not settled in life. When he realises that she loves him despite his situation, he reciprocates.

Vasanthi's family is in deep financial trouble; to clear their debts, they arrange her marriage with Anand, a wealthy widower. Seeing the plight of Vasanthi, Madhavan agrees to marry her secretly in a temple. However, just before the wedding, Vasanthi's family members and relatives arrive at the venue, attack Madhavan and take Vasanthi away. Vasanthi is forcibly married to Anand. On their wedding night, Vasanthi consumes poison but is saved in time by Anand.

Learning about Vasanthi's past, Anand promises to send her back to Madhavan with just one request. He had agreed to remarriage due to pressure from his terminally ill mother who is unlikely to survive for more than seven days. He requests Vasanthi to pretend to be his wife for these seven days so that his mother can die peacefully, after which Vasanthi can return to Madhavan. She agrees, but at the same time slowly starts accepting his family and becomes close to Anand's daughter.

Anand locates Madhavan, poses as a film producer and offers Madhavan a chance to compose music for his next film. Madhavan agrees and starts composing music. Anand narrates the love story of Madhavan and Vasanthi and Vasanthi's wedding to Madhavan as the film's plot step by step, but with a different backdrop. Madhavan does not realise that the story being narrated is his real story and fervently focuses on song composition.

After Anand's mother dies on the seventh day, Anand invites Madhavan to come to his home for a discussion. He continues the story to the stage when the sick mother-in-law dies, and the heroine leaves her husband's home to live with her lover. He then asks Madhavan's opinion about the unusual climax. Though Madhavan does not like it, he appreciates it to please the "producer".

Anand takes Madhavan to his room, ostensibly to give him an advance, but actually to offer Vasanthi to him. Madhavan initially hesitates, but soon agrees on the condition that Vasanthi only come in the same way when she was his love, without the thaali. Vasanthi, however, cannot bring herself to remove it. When Anand tries to, she resists. Madhavan then tells Anand that Madhavan's lover can be Anand's wife, but Anand's wife can never be Madhavan's lover again. He concludes that adhering to traditional values is the right ending, wishes the couple well and leaves.

== Cast ==
- K. Bhagyaraj as Palakkad Madhavan
- Rajesh as Anand
- Ambika as Vasanthi
- Kallapetti Singaram as Vasanthi's grandfather
- Master Haja Sheriff as Gopi
- Pandiarajan as the flower seller in the temple (uncredited)

== Production ==
The story of Andha 7 Naatkal was inspired by the life of the comedian J. P. Chandrababu; his marriage had failed after his wife revealed to him that she was in love with someone else. K. Bhagyaraj, besides directing, also wrote the story and screenplay. The film was produced by P. S. Jayaraman and M. Nachiappan for Srini Creations. Cinematography was handled by P. Ganesh Pandian, and editing by R. Bhaskaran. The idea of creating the character of Palakkad Madhavan occurred to Bhagyaraj when he saw composer M. S. Viswanathan conversing in Malayalam with a Tamil-speaking tabla player. Bhagyaraj was initially to play the doctor Anand, but after considering the impact he could create in the role of Madhavan, he took that role and Rajesh was instead cast as Anand. Although Ambika was having consecutive box-office failures, Bhagayaraj was convinced only she could pull off the role of Vasanthi and cast her, though others objected and wanted her replaced.

== Soundtrack ==
The music was composed by M. S. Viswanathan. When poet Kuruvikkarambai Shanmugam was approached by Bhagyaraj to write lyrics for the film, he immediately agreed; the only song he wrote for the film was "Kavithai Arangerum", set in the Carnatic raga known as Suddha Dhanyasi. The song "Thendralathu Unnidathil" is set in Jog raga.

Track listing
No.	Title	Lyrics	Singer(s)	Length
1.	"Kavithai Arangerum"	Kuruvikkarambai Shanmugam	Jayachandran, S. Janaki	4:37
2.	"Swararaaga"	Kannadasan	Jayachandran, Vani Jairam	4:24
3.	"Enni Irundhadhu"	Vairamuthu	Malaysia Vasudevan, Vani Jairam	4:42
4.	"Thendraladhu Unnidathil"	Kannadasan	Jayachandran, S. Janaki	4:52
Total length:				18:35

== Release and reception ==
Andha 7 Naatkal was released on 26 October 1981, Diwali day. Reviewing the film for Ananda Vikatan, Rajesh rated the film 58 out of 100. Nalini Sastry of Kalki praised Bhagyaraj for his acting and direction, while also appreciating the performances of Ambika and Haja Sharif. She praised the climax, calling it the main highlight of the film and concluded that Bhagyaraj had perfected the trick of moving the film in a humorous manner and then making it serious towards the end. Despite facing competition from other Diwali releases such as Tik Tik Tik and Ranuva Veeran, the film emerged a commercial success, and Bhaskaran won the Tamil Nadu State Film Award for Best Editor.Some what similar ending is seen in Lal Jose directorial "Chandran Udikkunna Dikkil" where Bhagyaraj,Ambika and Rajesh replaced by Dileep,Kavya and Samyukta Verma and Biju Menon as additional character.Life situations are beyond languages,same as love, affection and parting!!!!

== Remakes ==
Andha 7 Naatkal was remade in Telugu as Radha Kalyanam (1981), in Hindi as Woh Saat Din (1983), and in Kannada as Love Maadi Nodu (1989).

== Legacy ==
Andha 7 Naatkal became a trendsetter in Tamil cinema for highlighting the importance of traditional values and their relevance in society. Bhagyaraj's role as Madhavan created an such impact that whenever he went to Kerala, people would ask him to speak some dialogues from the film. The 2015 film Palakkattu Madhavan was named after the character. The skit "Enakkum Unakkum" was later used in Mookuthi Amman (2020) as the song Engels Ramasamy (RJ Balaji) has in mind which the title character (Nayanthara) correctly guesses. The film's title was used for a 2025 film of the same name, which featured Bhagyaraj in a supporting role as the makers of the film felt that the title was apt for the story.

== Bibliography ==
- Dhananjayan, G. (2011). The Best of Tamil Cinema, 1931 to 2010: 1931–1976. Galatta Media. OCLC 733724281.
- Rajadhyaksha, Ashish; Willemen, Paul (1998) [1994]. Encyclopaedia of Indian Cinema. British Film Institute and Oxford University Press. ISBN 0-19-563579-5.
