= My Wife's Murder =

- Directed by: Jiji Philip
- Written by: Atul Sabharwal
- Based on: Madhyanam Hathya (Telugu)(2004) by Ram Gopal Varma
- Produced by: Anil Kapoor Film Company; Ram Gopal Varma
- Starring: Anil Kapoor; Suchitra Krishnamurti; Boman Irani; Nandana Sen; Rajesh Tandon
- Cinematography: P. S. Vinod
- Edited by: Ajoy Varma
- Music by: Amar Mohile
- Production company: RGV Film Company
- Release date: 19 August 2005
- Running time: 133 min
- Country: India
- Language: Hindi

My Wife's Murder is a 2005 Indian Hindi-language thriller film directed by Jijy Philip. The cast includes Anil Kapoor, Suchitra Krishnamurti, Boman Irani and Nandana Sen. The film is a remake of 2004 Telugu film, Madhyanam Hathya, directed by Ram Gopal Varma. The movie seems to closely follow the story of Horace William Manton, the main accused in the Luton Sack Murder Case.

== Plot ==
Police Inspector Tejpal Randhawa is assigned to investigate the case of the dead woman whose body is recovered from a small pond. Insp. Tejpal checks if this matter can be linked with a missing person's report filed by Ravi Patwardhan and his father-in-law. The dead woman is identified as Sheela, Ravi's wife. According to Ravi, Sheela had left their home to go visit Shirdi along with her parents. When Ravi is informed by his father-in-law that she had not arrived at their house at all, even 24 hours after her departure, they take the matter seriously, and Ravi accompanies his father-in-law to the nearest police station and files a report that she is missing. Insp. Tejpal concludes that Sheela was waylaid on her way to her parents' house by person(s) unknown, beaten, and her body was left in the pond. But this case puzzles him, as there was no apparent motive for unknown person(s) to waylay her, as no money was taken and her body did not show any sign of sexual molestation. Taking these facts into consideration, Insp. Tejpal starts to disbelieve and suspect Ravi. Ravi's assistant Reena tries to help Ravi. However, her involvement makes the matter worse for her and her boyfriend Raj, who suspects her to have a relationship with Ravi. The movie then takes the audience through a thrilling tale of how Tejpal chases down the fleeing Ravi and ultimately ascertains the truth behind Sheela's murder.

== Cast ==
- Anil Kapoor as Ravi Patwardhan: He is a man whose wife is murdered and he has to make it out of the matter proving himself innocent.
- Suchitra Krishnamoorthy as Sheela Patwardhan: Ravi's wife who gets murdered.
- Boman Irani as Inspector Tejpal Randhawa: He investigates the case of Sheela's murder.
- Nandana Sen: Reena Wadhwa, Ravi's assistant who tries to help Ravi, however, unwillingly gets too much involved making the matter worse for her, her boyfriend and their relationship.
- Rajesh Tandon as Raj, Reena's boyfriend.
- Abhijeet Lahiri as Sheela's father
- Dr Manjali as Sheela's mother
- Manish Khanna as Wagle, Tejpal's assistant in the murder case.
- Abhay Bhargava as Tapan Banerjee
- Meenakshi Verma as Tejpal's wife.
- Geetanjali Rao as Ravi's maidservant.
- Shankar Sachdeva as Singh.
- Lalit Parashar as Hotel owner.
- Aloke Shukla as bus conductor.
- Master Zain Khan as Karan Patwardhan, Ravi's son.
- Baby Maariyah Khatri as Minni Patwardhan, Ravi's daughter.

== Music ==
- Kuch Lamhe Ki Bas - Ghulam Ali, composer: M. M. Kreem
