= Hamare Tumhare =

1979 Indian film directed by Umesh Mehra

Hamare Tummhare
- Promotional Poster
- Directed by: Umesh Mehra
- Written by: Abrar Alvi
- Produced by: F. C. Mehra
- Starring: Sanjeev Kumar; Raakhee; Amjad Khan; Anil Kapoor; Prem Krishen; David; Pucky Ali; Lucky Ali; Mehmood; Asrani; Amrish Puri
- Cinematography: Ashok Mehta
- Edited by: Pran Mehra
- Music by: R. D. Burman
- Production company: Eagle Films
- Release date: 26 January 1979 (India)
- Country: India
- Language: Hindi

Hamare Tumhare is a 1979 Hindi movie, produced by F. C. Mehra and directed by Umesh Mehra. The film stars Sanjeev Kumar, Raakhee, Amjad Khan, Prem Krishen, David, Mehmood, Asrani, Anil Kapoor (In his film debut), Lucky Ali, and Amrish Puri. The film's music is by R. D. Burman. The rights to this film are owned by Shah Rukh Khan's Red Chillies Entertainment.

== Plot ==
Widower Jairaj Verma lives with his four sons in a small apartment. Three of his sons are in their teens, while his youngest son is around 12 years. On the other hand, there is Maya Sinha, a widow, who also lives in a small apartment with three children, two sons and a daughter, Komal, who is about to get married. Then rumors spread abound that Maya and Jairaj are having an affair, and this adversely affects Komal's marriage, leaving her angry and confused. Jairaj and Maya's attempts to pacify their respective children that they are husband and wife, is of no avail, as they are convinced that Maya and Jairaj are having an illicit affair. The only solution to end this dilemma is for Jairaj and Maya to get married, and live together as a family, but will their children and the community accept them as husband and wife?

== Cast ==
- Sanjeev Kumar as Jayraj Verma
- Raakhee as Maya Sinha
- Amjad Khan as Mr. Chaudhary
- Anil Kapoor as Vipin
- Prem Krishen as Vikram Sinha
- David as Mr. Sinha
- Pucky Ali as Vijay
- Lucky Ali as Ajay
- Mehmood as Pandit Brij Bhushan
- Asrani as Gauri Shankar
- Amrish Puri as General Manager
- Rakesh Bedi as Suneel
- Shubha Khote as Mrs. Brij Bhushan
- Gayatri as Komal Sinha
- Radhika as Sonia
- Pinchoo Kapoor as Mr. Verma
- Lalita Kumari as Lady From Family Planning Center

== Soundtrack ==
The music of the film was composed by R.D. Burman, while lyrics were penned by Yogesh.

#	Title	Singer(s)
1	"Hum Aur Tum The Saathi"	Kishore Kumar
2	"Hum Aur Tum The Saathi" (Sad)	Kishore Kumar
3	"Jadu Daar Gayo Re Mope"	Kishore Kumar
4	"Aa Ha Haa Naino Ke Who"	Kishore Kumar
5	"Achha Chalo Ji Baba Maaf Kar Do"	Kishore Kumar, Usha Mangeshkar
6	"Kuchh Tum Karo Kuchh Hum Karen"	Kishore Kumar, Lata Mangeshkar
7	"Maaf Kar Do"	Kishore Kumar, Usha Mangeshkar
8	"Tu Meri Mehbooba Hai"	Amit Kumar
