= Badhaai Ho Badhaai =

2002 film by Satish Kaushik

- Directed by: Satish Kaushik
- Written by: Kavita Choudhary
- Story by: Vikraman
- Based on: Poove Unakkaga by Vikraman
- Produced by: Anish Kapoor
- Starring: Anil Kapoor; Shilpa Shetty; Keerthi Reddy
- Cinematography: Rajiv Jain
- Edited by: Sanjay Verma
- Music by: Anu Malik
- Distributed by: Kapoor & Kaushik Entertainment Pvt.Ltd
- Release date: 14 June 2002
- Country: India
- Language: Hindi
- Budget: ₹ 7.75 crore
- Box office: ₹ 6.99 crore

Badhaai Ho Badhaai (transl. Lots of congratulations) is a 2002 Indian Hindi-language romantic comedy film directed by Satish Kaushik. The film stars Anil Kapoor, Keerthi Reddy, and Shilpa Shetty. It is a Hindi remake of the 1996 Tamil film Poove Unakkaga. It is inspired in part by the 1996 Eddie Murphy film, The Nutty Professor.

== Plot ==
Chaddha and D'Souza were family friends for generations until the time when Mr. Chaddha's daughter Anjali falls in love with Steven D'Souza's son Anthony. Both families oppose since they belong to different religions. The couple elopes and gets married, which leads to the families abandoning them. Thus, enmity is created between the two families, and they start hating each other.

After 27 years, both families receive a letter from Raja, who is born to Anthony and Anjali and who is also visiting the families. Both families get furious seeing the letter and they decide not to permit him to stay in their homes. Raja comes to the town along with his friend but is shocked that he is not allowed inside both houses. Also, Moses D'Souza and Ranjeet Chaddha ask the entire street to not let any house for rent to Raja and Gopi. Ghuman Singh Rathod lives along with his wife, and he permits Raja to stay in his house.

Though Chaddha and Steven do not welcome Raja, they long to see their grandson from far. The Same is the case with their wives Mrs. Chaddha and Rosy D'Souza. Raja understands that only Vasudevan and Moses are still angry, while the other family members just pretend to be angry. So he decides to unite the family. He gets close with his grandparents slowly. Both of his grandmothers want to get Raja married. To escape, Raja lies that he is already married to a girl named Banto Betty.

To Raja's shock, suddenly one day, a girl name Banto arrives at his home introducing herself as Raja's wife. Raja gets confused and cannot reveal the truth as that would further disturb the progress he has made with the families. Banto plays pranks on Raja, which always irritates him. One day, Raja pretends to try to make love with Banto, so that she will reveal her true identity. Banto reveals that she is actually Tina D'Souza, the daughter of Anthony and Anjali. She also says that the only man who stays in touch with her family in the town is Ghuman Singh Rathod, from whom they get frequent updates about the happenings. Now, Banto questions Raja's intention behind trying to unite both families.

Raja reveals a flashback. He is a very fat boy who is called fatty by his friends. In his college met with Florence D'Souza, Moses's daughter. Raja gets attracted seeing Florence and befriends her. Slowly, friendship blossoms into love for Raja. Raja goes under extensive exercise and strict diet routine for six months to loose all the extra weight. After getting fit when Raja is about to convey his love towards Florence, he gets shocked to know that she is already in love with Ranjeet, Jassi Chaddha's son. As there already exists enmity between the two families, the couple fears whether their love would be accepted by their family members.

Raja, upon knowing about the problem, decides to help the couple unite with the approval of their family members. He takes the responsibility of convincing both families and disguises himself as the son of Anthony. Tina gets surprised knowing Raja's intention of getting the family united despite knowing the fact that Florence is in love with Ranjeet. Tina gets attracted towards Raja and falls for him but does not express it.

Meanwhile, both families get to know that Jassi and Florence are in love, and they get furious again. But Raja takes the couple somewhere and brings them back after a few hours. However, Ranjeet gets converted to Christianity while Florence gets converted to Hinduism. Raja makes the family members realize that love is eternal and it knows no religion and caste. Both families get convinced listening to Raja's words and they agree for the wedding between Florence and Ranjeet.

On the day of the wedding, both Anthony and Anjali arrive and the family members happily welcome them and they also apologize for keeping them away for 27 years. Both families mention that it was their son Raja who was responsible for reuniting the families. Anthony and Anjali get surprised and reveal that they have only one child, which is a daughter named Tina. Tina reveals that Raja is Florence's friend and has come to unite the families so that they can get married. Both families feel proud seeing Raja, and they suggest getting Tina married to him. However, Raja denies, saying that he has already fallen in love with someone (Florence) and he can never fall in love with another girl. The film ends with Raja leaving the house and walking away alone.

== Cast ==
- Anil Kapoor as Raja Saxena / Fatty
- Shilpa Shetty as Banto Betty / Tina D'Souza
- Keerthi Reddy as Florence D'Souza
- Amrish Puri as Mr. Chaddha
- Farida Jalal as Mrs. Chaddha
- Kader Khan as Ghuman Singh Rathod
- Anang Desai as Moses D'Souza
- Rohini Hattangadi as Rosy D'Souza
- Vinay Jain as Ranjeet Chaddha
- Dinesh Kaushik as Anthony D'Souza
- Mushtaq Khan as Bali
- Suresh Menon as Lucky Iyer
- Govind Namdeo as Jassi Chaddha
- Hemant Pandey as Writer
- K. Vishwanath as Steven D'Souza
- Aavin Ashta as Ravi, son of Mr. Chaddha
- Rana Jung Bahadur as Khan

== Soundtrack ==
Badhaai Ho Badhaai

Soundtrack album by Anu Malik
- Genre: Feature film soundtrack
- Label: Universal Music India

The soundtrack was composed by Anu Malik with the lyrics are by Javed Akhtar.

#	Title	Singer(s)
1	"Raag Banke"	Shaan, Alka Yagnik
2	"Teri Zindagi Mein Pyar Hai"	KK, Alka Yagnik
3	"Dil Bata Mere Dil Bata"	Sonu Nigam
4	"Badhaai Ho Badhaai"	Udit Narayan, Zubeen Garg & Ila Arun
5	"Jogan Jogan"	Kunal Ganjawala, Preeti, Pinky
6	"Tehro Zaraa"	Sonu Nigam, Alka Yagnik

== Reception ==
Taran Adarsh of IndiaFM gave the film one out of five stars, writing, "On the whole, BADHAAI HO BADHAAI is saddled by a weak script and despite publicising the 'different' look of Anil in its promotion, will not find many takers. Watch it only if you're a die-hard Anil Kapoor fan!" Priya Ganapati of Rediff.com wrote, "Badhaai Ho Badhaai is marred by a poor script, loud acting and slapstick packaged as humor. And despite its attempt to piggyback on one of Hollywood's successful comedy films, it fails to redeem itself."
