= 24 season 8 =

24
- Season 8
- Promotional poster
- Starring: Kiefer Sutherland; Mary Lynn Rajskub; Anil Kapoor; Annie Wersching; Mykelti Williamson; Katee Sackhoff; Chris Diamantopoulos; John Boyd; Freddie Prinze, Jr.; Cherry Jones
- No. of episodes: 24

Release
- Original network: Fox
- Original release: January 17 – May 24, 2010

Season chronology
- ← Previous; Season 7 Next → Live Another Day

The eighth season of the American drama television series 24, also known as Day 8, premiered in the United States on Fox on January 17, 2010. The eighth season was announced as the final season of 24 and the show's series finale aired on May 24, 2010. However, the series returned with a ninth season as 24: Live Another Day, which aired in 2014. The season's storyline begins and ends at 4:00 p.m.

== Season overview ==
Set 18 months after season 7, the story arc involves Jack Bauer contending with assassination threats made during a peace conference between President of the United States Allison Taylor, President Omar Hassan of the fictional Islamic Republic of Kamistan (IRK) and Russia, with a treaty negotiated and ready to be signed by the three parties the following day. The season is set in New York City, with CTU's New York City Office having been re-activated. While there were originally no plans for filming in New York due to budget constraints, some scenes were shot on-location.

The three main acts of season eight are:

1. CTU pursues Hassan's brother who is working with the Russian mafia to have nuclear rods transported to his home country.
2. Multiple government agencies pursue Kamistani terrorists who kill Farhad Hassan and attempt to strike at America directly.
3. Jack wages a one-man war against the members of the Russian government who are responsible for the conspiracy after Allison Taylor refuses to do anything that could jeopardize the treaty.

=== Major subplots ===
- Jack worries that Renee Walker has become a danger to herself and others.
- A relatively inexperienced CTU team is limited in its ability to help Jack.
- Dana Walsh fears that she will lose her job when a stalker threatens to reveal that she has a criminal record.
- A mole at CTU helps the terrorists evade authorities.
- Extremists in the Taylor administration believe that the safest option is to give in to the terrorist demands.
- Charles Logan makes a return and wishes to exact revenge on Jack Bauer.
- Chloe O'Brian attempts to rein Jack in before his rampage either gets him killed or cause an international crisis.

=== Summary ===
The signing of an important treaty between the US and the IRK (Islamic Republic of Kamistan) is about to take place at the UN. Kamistani terrorists, resentful of America and disappointed at Hassan's willingness to concede their attempts at developing nuclear weapons, choose this day to attempt to assassinate the Kamistani president, Omar Hassan. The assassination attempt is initially led by Hassan's brother Farhad.

CTU learns from the rescue of Hassan that terrorists have a plan to acquire nuclear rods from the Russian mob. With the help of Renee Walker, who is struggling to keep her life together, Jack goes undercover and forces the cooperation of Sergei Bazhaev's mob family. The nuclear rods are given to Samir Mehran, when Bazhaev's older son Josef betrays him for killing his younger brother Oleg who was exposed to the rods and was suffering from radiation poisoning who plans to make a dirty bomb on American soil. Hassan's head of security, Tarin Faroush is revealed to be a part of Mehran's group and they present an ultimatum to Taylor's government — she must hand over Hassan for execution or the bomb will be detonated.

When Taylor orders that Hassan still be protected at all costs, a US black-ops team attempts to kidnap him. Jack Bauer and the rest of Hassan's protective detail kill all but one member of the team but upon learning of the ultimatum, Hassan turns himself into Mehran. With the nuclear crisis averted, CTU agents attempt to save Hassan and close in on Mehran. However, they arrive to see that Hassan has already been assassinated. Taylor is able to resurrect the treaty by convincing Hassan's wife Dalia to assume her husband's position as interim president and to sign the treaty on her country's behalf.

Considering their duties to be over, Jack and Renee return to his apartment where they have a romantic encounter. However, a Russian assassin follows them there and fires through the windows to tie up loose ends. Renee is hit and a frantic race ensues as Jack rushes her to the hospital. She dies on arrival whereupon Jack vows to avenge her death and bring everyone involved in the conspiracy and cover-up to justice. He learns that the Russian government are behind everything as they see the treaty as a threat to their influence in the world and supported and funded Mehran's group to destroy the peace process. Allison Taylor though outraged by the conspiracy, still believes that good can come from the signing and decides to continue with the proceedings. She fears that Jack's actions will be enough to have the treaty called off and orders his lockdown. Jack frees himself and at the cost of a third world war, begins to hunt down and kill every member of the conspiracy that killed Walker and Hassan. Chloe who has assumed control of CTU is forced to issue a manhunt for Jack. This leads to a cat and mouse game when Charles Logan approaches Allison Taylor and offers to use the unique resources at his disposal to capture Bauer. Chloe has her authority challenged when Logan has Jason Pillar installed at CTU and tries to prevent him and Logan from having Jack assassinated before he can expose the cover up.

Jack kills Dana Walsh (the mole at CTU), Mikhail Novakovich (the Russian Foreign Minister) and Pavel Tokarev (the assassin who killed Renee). After ambushing Logan, Jack learns that Russian president Yuri Suvarov, who has arrived in New York for the signing is the mastermind behind the conspiracy. Jack aims a sniper rifle at Logan's office and orders him to lure Suvarov there so he can murder them both. Logan is forced to agree and Jack prepares to pull the trigger, but Chloe talks him out of it at the last second. When President Taylor has free rein to sign the treaty and have Jack permanently silenced she has a change of heart and turns herself in to the Attorney General. Wanted by Russian and American forces Jack says goodbye to Chloe who is watching him through the camera feed of a predator drone. She orders that the feed be turned off and sees Jack disappear from the screen as he disappears from her life.

== Characters ==
Season 8 main cast: (from left to right) John Boyd, Katee Sackhoff, Mykelti Williamson, Mary Lynn Rajskub, Freddie Prinze Jr., Annie Wersching, Kiefer Sutherland, Anil Kapoor, Cherry Jones, and Chris Diamantopoulos

=== Starring ===
- Kiefer Sutherland as Jack Bauer (24 episodes)
- Mary Lynn Rajskub as Chloe O'Brian (24 episodes)
- Anil Kapoor as Kamistan President Omar Hassan (15 episodes)
- Annie Wersching as Renee Walker (13 episodes)
- Mykelti Williamson as Brian Hastings (17 episodes)
- Katee Sackhoff as Dana Walsh (20 episodes)
- Chris Diamantopoulos as Rob Weiss (12 episodes)
- John Boyd as Arlo Glass (24 episodes)
- Freddie Prinze Jr. as Cole Ortiz (24 episodes)
- Cherry Jones as President Allison Taylor (20 episodes)

=== Special guest stars ===
- Gregory Itzin as Charles Logan (8 episodes)
- Elisha Cuthbert as Kim Bauer (2 episodes)

=== Guest starring ===
- Nazneen Contractor as Kayla Hassan (21 episodes)
- Necar Zadegan as Dalia Hassan (20 episodes)
- T. J. Ramini as Tarin Faroush (11 episodes)
- Bob Gunton as Secretary of State Ethan Kanin (10 episodes)
- Mido Hamada as Samir Mehran (10 episodes)
- Clayne Crawford as Kevin Wade (9 episodes)
- Reed Diamond as Jason Pillar (8 episodes)
- Frank John Hughes as Secretary of Homeland Security Tim Woods (8 episodes)
- Akbar Kurtha as Farhad Hassan (8 episodes)
- Navid Negahban as Jamot (8 episodes)
- Jürgen Prochnow as Sergei Bazhaev (7 episodes)
- Graham McTavish as Mikhail Novakovich (7 episodes)
- David Anders as Josef Bazhaev (6 episodes)
- Michael Filipowich as Nick Coughlin (6 episodes)
- Julian Morris as Agent Owen (6 episodes)
- Hrach Titizian as Nabeel (6 episodes)
- Jennifer Westfeldt as Meredith Reed (6 episodes)
- Julie Claire as Eden Linley (5 episodes)
- Joel Bissonnette as Pavel Tokarev (4 episodes)
- Gene Farber as Oleg Bazhaev (4 episodes)
- Doug Hutchison as Davros (4 episodes)
- Michael Madsen as Jim Ricker (4 episodes)
- Nick Jameson as Russian President Yuri Suvarov (3 episodes)
- Rami Malek as Marcos Al-Zacar (3 episodes)
- Callum Keith Rennie as Vladimir Laitanan (3 episodes)
- Stephen Root as Bill Prady (3 episodes)
- Eriq La Salle as the UN Secretary General (2 episodes)
- D. B. Sweeney as Mark Bledsoe (2 episodes)
- Paul Wesley as Stephen (2 episodes)
- Mare Winningham as Elaine Al-Zacar (2 episodes)

== Episodes ==
No. overall	No. in season	Title	Directed by	Written by	Original release date	Prod. code	US viewers (millions)
169	1	"Day 8: 4:00 p.m. – 5:00 p.m."	Brad Turner	Howard Gordon & Evan Katz	January 17, 2010	8AFF01	11.44
18 months after the events of Day 7, President Allison Taylor is preparing to sign a nuclear treaty with Omar Hassan, the president of the Islamic Republic of Kamistan, in New York City, where Jack Bauer, having fully retired from federal agent duties, has finished his therapy and is preparing to return to Los Angeles with Kim and her family. As Hassan prepares for the signing, he is revealed to be engaging in a secret affair with journalist Meredith Reed, causing a personal problem with his wife Dalia, and his affair is discouraged by his brother Farhad. After surviving an attempt made by Russian thugs led by Davros, a friend of Jack's named Victor Aruz visits Jack and informs him that there will be an assassination attempt on Hassan, agreeing to cooperate in exchange for immunity. Reluctant to get back into action at the time he is preparing to return to Los Angeles, Jack nevertheless calls and informs Chloe O'Brian, who is currently working at the reestablished CTU, and CTU director Brian Hastings sends a team led by agent Cole Ortiz to bring in Jack and Aruz. The duo evades Davros's men in a tense chase until Jack entrusts Aruz to Ortiz and decides to return to Kim, but Davros destroys the helicopter Aruz is trying to board, and a fatally wounded Aruz reveals that the assassin has an inside associate close to Hassan before dying.
170	2	"Day 8: 5:00 p.m. – 6:00 p.m."	Brad Turner	Teleplay by : Manny Coto & Brannon Braga; Story by : Howard Gordon	January 17, 2010	8AFF02	11.44
Jack is brought to CTU, where he is debriefed and released, while CTU finds evidence that apparently proves Reed to be the inside person, causing her to be arrested and brought to CTU as a result, but she denies the accusations. Suspicious about the fact that it was so easy to find Reed as the inside person, O'Brian asks Jack for help, but he refuses, wishing to return with his family. However, Kim reveals that O'Brian informed her earlier about the situation, and completely understanding that Jack is needed, she convinces him to help O'Brian and accomplish his mission, before departing with her family. Officially getting involved with the current situation, Jack enters the armory to take guns before he is detained by agents, but threatens to reveal Hastings' error of not having enough reinforcements that resulted in the death of Aruz, forcing Hastings to let him do his investigation on who the real insider is, with O'Brian's backup; the pair ultimately detect Davros on the cameras, and Jack heads to the location. Davros is revealed to be a police officer, and he pays a visit to his fellow officer, who is preparing to join Hassan's security detail, ending up holding the officer and his wife at gunpoint and threatening to kill her, forcing him to let Davros replace him. Meanwhile, Dana Walsh, another CTU agent, gets a call from a man named Kevin Wade, who knows her true identity, while Hassan's brother Farhad is revealed to be the true inside person assisting with the assassination.
171	3	"Day 8: 6:00 p.m. – 7:00 p.m."	Milan Cheylov	David Fury & Alex Gansa	January 18, 2010	8AFF03	11.11
As Ortiz arrives at the United Nations to lead Hassan's security detail which now includes Davros, Bauer arrives at the alley and finds the house with the help of a local, only to find Davros' partner and wife dead, having already been killed by Davros. As Bauer exits the house, he is knocked unconscious by two police officers, one of whom starts torturing him as revenge of the deaths of his partner and his wife, but Bauer manages to free himself and convinces the other officer to take him to the UN. Meanwhile, Hastings continues interrogating Reed, and Hassan reveals the affair to him, hoping to prove her innocence, while Wade arrives outside CTU and demands sex from Walsh, threatening to reveal her true identity, and she agrees for one night and gives her apartment key to him. CTU soon gains intel suggesting an attack on the UN, and Hastings orders the evacuation of political figures, including Hassan. However, Bauer learns that the intel is a ruse and that Davros is among Hassan's security, and manages to call Ortiz and reveal his discovery to him. As Davros prepares to detonate a bomb in the street to cause Hassan's car to crash and thus kill him, Ortiz manages to arrive in time in his own car and pushes Hassan's car out of the route just as Davros detonates the bomb, taking the hit instead.
172	4	"Day 8: 7:00 p.m. – 8:00 p.m."	Milan Cheylov	Chip Johannessen & Patrick Harbinson	January 18, 2010	8AFF04	11.11
Ortiz and Hassan both survive the attack, while Farhad, who was traveling in another car with Hassan's wife and daughter, kills a CTU agent and escapes, exposing his involvement in the process. His assassination attempt foiled, Davros attempts to flee, with Ortiz spotting him and pursuing him, only for Davros to quickly gain the upper hand and prepare to kill him after Ortiz refuses to follow Davros's demands of calling CTU to assist in his own escape, but Davros is quickly shot and killed by Bauer just in time. Hastings reveals to Hassan the truth that Farhad is the real inside man, and Reed is ultimately freed, while Hassan decides to end the affair. Walsh, meanwhile, receives another harassing phone call from Kevin Wade, who is now staying at her house. After Jack takes pictures of specific tattoos on Davros' body and sends them to CTU, technicians find radioactive material in the body, and Hassan reveals that people in his government once intended to buy weapons-grade uranium from Russian associates, meaning that the threat is not over. Meanwhile, Farhad visits Sergei Bazhaev, the seller, and demands proof of the existence of the uranium rods, and Sergei reveals his younger son Oleg, who was exposed to radiation. The pictures Bauer sent reveal the involvement of a Russian mafia group led by Vladimir Laitanan, while FBI agent Renee Walker, who had since been fired from her job after torturing Alan Wilson at the end of Day 7, is revealed to have once been an undercover agent in Laitanan's group. Hastings brings Walker to CTU and asks her to infiltrate the group again, while Bauer, concerned about Walker's behavior and believing she may not be able to handle the mission properly, convinces Hastings to let him be her partner. Walker finds an associate at a store and viciously amputates his fingers to remove his GPS device, an act that shocks Bauer and causes him to order her to stop the mission, but Walker insists on continuing.
173	5	"Day 8: 8:00 p.m. – 9:00 p.m."	Brad Turner	Teleplay by : Evan Katz & Alex Gansa; Story by : Howard Gordon	January 25, 2010	8AFF05	10.81
As Walker convinces the associate to take her to Laitanan, Bauer tasks O'Brian with investigating the history between Walker and Laitanan, who is revealed to have attempted to rape her a few times. Laitanan does not trust Walker, and abducts her and the associate to a secluded place, where he kills the associate and holds her at gunpoint. CTU manages to find their location and awaits Bauer's order to attack and rescue her, but Walker manages to make Laitanan trust her, and Bauer orders CTU to stand down. Meanwhile, Hassan orders making arrests of the opposition members in Kamistan as a result of the attempt on his life, while Taylor tries to dissuade him, but to no avail, and an angered Dalia finally decides to leave him. Walsh visits Wade and tries to pay him so that he will leave her alone, but he instead demands that she help him and his friend steal a great amount of money, while Oleg's older brother Josef chooses to take Oleg to a physician for treatment against Sergei's orders.
174	6	"Day 8: 9:00 p.m. – 10:00 p.m."	Brad Turner	Manny Coto & Brannon Braga	February 1, 2010	8AFF06	9.96
Laitanan sends his men to meet Bauer, who introduces himself as a German dealer willing to buy the rods, which Laitanan has no current knowledge about. After Bauer transfers the first part of the money, Laitanan orders his men to kill him, but Ortiz kills all but one of the operatives with his sniper rifle, and Bauer threatens to come after Laitanan if he does not honor the deal, forcing Laitanan to order his operative to bring Bauer to the hideout. Meanwhile, Sergei's operatives find and return Josef and Oleg after killing the physician, and as punishment for Josef defying his orders, Sergei kills Oleg. Growing increasingly alarmed, Hassan orders the arrests to continue, including that of one of his closest cabinet members, Jamot, while the arrests make some of the delegate countries consider withdrawing from the treaty. Walsh calls Wade and informs him of a police warehouse that contains a lot of blocked money, meeting him and his friend outside CTU and arranging the plan, during which Wade gets intimate with her, an act which is seen on the camera by CTU agent Arlo Glass.
175	7	"Day 8: 10:00 p.m. – 11:00 p.m."	Milan Cheylov	Chip Johannessen & Patrick Harbinson	February 8, 2010	8AFF07	10.27
Laitanan starts making calls to find out about the rods, but when Sergei gets the call, he discourages Laitanan from searching, saying that no one deals such material, before sending his men to find out the source of Laitanan. Laitanan finishes calling every associate without finding anything, but Walker demands that he continue searching. Refusing to listen, Laitanan gets abusive towards her, but it provokes Walker into viciously stabbing him several times, killing him; in her rage, she accidentally stabs Bauer, though he still manages to kill Laitanan's remaining operative and calls Hastings, telling him that Walker killed Laitanan in self-defense. Immediately regretting her outburst, a tearful Walker admits that Bauer was right to be concerned about her inability to handle the mission and expresses she has no one to turn to, but Bauer comforts her, telling her that she still has him at her side. Suddenly, Sergei's operatives enter the hideout and manage to abduct Bauer just before Ortiz and other agents arrive on the scene, and Walker, who was told to hide, tells them about Bauer's situation. Meanwhile, Walsh helps Wade and his friend infiltrate the warehouse and find the money, but Wade's friend decides to continue searching for other materials, and when they try to leave, an officer enters, but they beat him and escape. In the meantime, after security agent Tarin Faroush challenges Hassan's decisions, Hassan has him arrested, believing he is not to be trusted as well, though Hassan's daughter Kayla is convinced that Faroush is innocent, while she is revealed to have a secret relationship with him.
176	8	"Day 8: 11:00 p.m. – 12:00 a.m."	Milan Cheylov	David Fury	February 15, 2010	8AFF08	8.58
As a captured Bauer is brought to Sergei, he offers more money than Farhad for the rods, but Sergei instead orders his operative to torture Bauer for his source, believing him to be a law enforcement operative. Bauer eventually manages to free himself and alert CTU, which rescues him in time, and Sergei is ultimately arrested. Bauer offers Sergei immunity for him and Josef in exchange for delivering the rods, which Sergei accepts and calls his men, but it is revealed that Josef has betrayed Sergei and stolen the rods as revenge for his father killing Oleg, and he calls Farhad and arranges a deal for himself. Meanwhile, Kayla reveals her relationship with Faroush to Hassan, hoping to have Faroush released, but Hassan refuses to do so, believing that Faroush's relationship with his own daughter would be the best way to get close to him. Wade dishonors his deal with Walsh that he would leave her alone after taking the money, while Glass shows the picture of the intimacy between Wade and Walsh to Ortiz, who is her fiance.
177	9	"Day 8: 12:00 a.m. – 1:00 a.m."	Brad Turner	Teleplay by : Chip Johannessen & Patrick Harbinson; Story by : Alex Gansa	February 22, 2010	8AFF09	8.83
Josef gets a call from Sergei about the deal with the government, but just as he is persuaded by his father to change his mind about giving the rods to Farhad, Josef is killed by Farhad's associates, who take the rods. Chief of Staff Rob Weiss advises Hastings to put the blame on Walker to avoid his own prosecution, and he sends a DOJ agent to interrogate Walker. Samir Mehran, Farhad's associate, reveals to him his real plan of attacking the U.S., instead of Kamistan, with the rods, but Farhad immediately becomes stunned at this plan and ultimately chooses not to join them, escaping the compound and calling CTU for cooperation, while being shot and pursued by Mehran's operatives. While the DOJ agent accuses Walker of killing Laitanan in cold blood instead of self-defense, Bauer learns of Walker's interrogation and reminds Hastings of his team's low skill status, and offers full cooperation if Hastings stops Walker's investigation, which Hastings accepts. Meanwhile, Walsh prepares to attack Wade and his friend in a secluded place in retaliation for Wade dishonoring their deal, but Ortiz arrives and confronts her, and she explains part of her past to him. Ortiz holds Wade and his friend at gunpoint and threatens to kill them if they do not leave her, but while Wade is persuaded to leave, Wade's friend angrily chooses not to listen to Ortiz. He shoots Wade and attempts to attack the pair while their backs are turned, but a dying Wade manages to warn them in time, and Ortiz quickly shoots and kills Wade's friend.
178	10	"Day 8: 1:00 a.m. – 2:00 a.m."	Brad Turner	Manny Coto & Brannon Braga	March 1, 2010	8AFF10	8.63
As Ortiz and Walsh bury the bodies and return to CTU, Bauer and his team arrive at Mehran's hideout to find Farhad, having been shot by Mehran's operatives, and after Farhad ultimately dies of his wounds, Bauer devises a plan to announce Farhad's survival in order to lure an operative to the hospital. Having already left his hideout, Mehran hears the news announcing that Farhad survived his wounds and sends Marcos Al-Zacar to finish Farhad, while Marcos calls his mother, Elaine, and advises her to leave the city. Marcos arrives at the hospital and is spotted by O'Brian, who manages to recognize the type of the bomb he is wearing with the help of an agent, and defuses it remotely. Marcos enters Farhad's room and shoots the body several times before finding it already dead, and tries to detonate his bomb, but it has already been defused. Bauer and other agents chase Marcos to a containment chamber which he locks himself inside and calls Mehran, who starts instructing him as to how to manually activate the bomb. Meanwhile, Faroush escapes during transfer and goes to a hotel, where Kayla joins him and they start having sex, while Hassan tries to call and inform her about the bomb by telling Dalia, who is about to leave for Kamistan.
179	11	"Day 8: 2:00 a.m. – 3:00 a.m."	Nelson McCormick	Evan Katz & David Fury	March 8, 2010	8AFF11	8.86
As Marcos continues working on the bomb, CTU identifies him and brings Elaine to the hospital, where Bauer informs her about Marcos's actions and affiliations and instructs her to convince Marcos to surrender and cooperate, which she tries, but to no avail. Bauer then threatens Marcos with keeping Elaine at the city to die in the upcoming attack, and this ultimately forces him to open the door. However, at that point, the bomb is fully activated, and Mehran triggers the detonation that ultimately kills Marcos, but not before Marcos reveals that Faroush is actually an associate of Mehran's. Dalia manages to call and inform Kayla about Faroush, and after she reveals their location, she is instructed to act normally until CTU's arrival. Meanwhile, Bill Prady, Wade's probation officer, calls Walsh and asks about him, and she initially refuses to know Wade, but Prady reveals the phone logs and insists on meeting her soon, so they arrange a meeting at CTU.
180	12	"Day 8: 3:00 a.m. – 4:00 a.m."	Nelson McCormick	Chip Johannessen & Patrick Harbinson	March 15, 2010	8AFF12	9.01
Despite (or perhaps due to) the presence of headstrong NYPD SWAT, Tarin escapes with Kayla and brings her to Samir's hideout, an abandoned bank vault. Samir contacts Hassan and offers to trade her life for "File 33," which turns out to be a detailed how-to document on circumventing America's radiological defenses. Jack urges Hassan to stall while CTU tracks down the terrorists, while at CTU, Dana meets with Officer Prady, who has clearance to obtain CTU's records of the security-camera footage of Nick and Kevin's robbery; Dana decides to come clean and calls Cole to wish him a teary good-bye. A captured Kayla convinces Tarin to help her escape, but Tarin is shot as they flee, but Kayla takes his car and calls CTU on Tarin's cell phone. Jack and Cole arrive at the bank vault to find Samir and his confederates gone, while Arlo's drones monitor them on the street, and facial recognition identifies one of them as Tarin, very much alive, as the entire "escape" was actually faked. Jack realizes that Kayla's car, currently arriving at CTU, must be armed with a weapon that can take out the entire office, and the weapon is revealed to be an EMP bomb. Kayla is evacuated from the car before the bomb detonates, but CTU, the linchpin of New York's radiological detection grid, is ultimately incapacitated, giving Samir freedom to launch his attack.
181	13	"Day 8: 4:00 a.m. – 5:00 a.m."	Milan Cheylov	Teleplay by : Manny Coto & Brannon Braga; Story by : Howard Gordon	March 22, 2010	8AFF13	8.70
While Bauer, Ortiz and two more agents chase Mehran and his men, Bauer calls his friend at NSA and tasks him to send a team to assist CTU to become functional again, while O'Brian calls Walker, who has returned home, and informs her about Bauer's situation. Mehran orders his men to hold Bauer's team until he and Faroush leave with the rods on a boat, and after a long, drawn-out shootout, Bauer and Ortiz eventually survive after Walker arrives and saves them in the nick of time. Meanwhile, the NSA agents ignore O'Brian's recovery method, and she enforces her opinion by using a gun, and when her method proves efficient, Hastings demands that the NSA leave, allowing O'Brian to successfully manage to return CTU to functionality. In the meantime, Prady decides to talk to Hastings about Walsh and reveals his intentions to her, while hinting that he knows the truth that Walsh was involved in the robbery, but Walsh kills him and hides his body, before calling and reporting to Mehran, revealed to be a mole.
182	14	"Day 8: 5:00 a.m. – 6:00 a.m."	Milan Cheylov	Teleplay by : Alex Gansa; Story by : Evan Katz	March 29, 2010	8AFF14	8.48
Taylor tasks Bauer to lead Hassan's security detail, and Bauer includes Walker in his mission, but Taylor then gets a call from Mehran, who reveals that the rods have successfully been transformed into a bomb capable of mass murder, and it will be used in New York City unless she surrenders Hassan in less than an hour, while Faroush is tasked to watch the bomb and detonate it when Mehran gives the order. A huge debate starts at the Cabinet on whether to surrender Hassan, which Weiss and General Brucker support, but Secretary of State Ethan Kanin opposes. Ultimately, Taylor decides not to surrender to the demand and tasks CTU to find the bomb, but Brucker and Weiss team up secretly to execute a clandestine operation to capture and deliver Hassan in order to leave the government uninvolved. Weiss recovers Hassan's route from Kanin's computer before Kanin finds out and attempts to stop them, but ends up suffering a heart attack and is ultimately locked in his office. Brucker's team attacks Hassan and his detail, and a battle ensues, but ultimately, Brucker's team are defeated and Bauer captures their chief, Adrion Bishop, who reveals Mehran's demand and the purpose of the operation.
183	15	"Day 8: 6:00 a.m. – 7:00 a.m."	Brad Turner	Chip Johannessen & Patrick Harbinson	April 5, 2010	8AFF15	7.42
Having learned about Mehran's demand and unwilling to let thousands of people die when the bomb is detonated, Hassan attacks Bauer and tells Bishop his desire to surrender. Hassan and Bishop lock Hassan's family, Bauer and Walker and escape, and Bishop calls Mehran, who tells Faroush to stop the detonation. Bauer frees himself and informs Taylor of Hassan's actions, as well as the operation conducted by Brucker and Weiss, and Taylor has Brucker and Weiss arrested while sending Kanin into medical care for his heart attack. After Bishop and Faroush swap Hassan and the bomb, Bishop is arrested and the bomb is secured, and CTU starts chasing Hassan and Faroush on satellite, while Hassan tries to dissuade Faroush from assisting Mehran with his plans, to no avail. Walsh alerts Faroush, who drives inside a parking lot, where he secretly delivers Hassan to a woman before luring the agents away and committing suicide. The woman takes Hassan in her car and leaves the lot, and Bauer deduces the presence of a mole inside CTU.
184	16	"Day 8: 7:00 a.m. – 8:00 a.m."	Brad Turner	Manny Coto & Brannon Braga	April 5, 2010	8AFF16	7.42
CTU finds out that Walsh is the mole assisting Mehran with his plans, and Walsh tries to escape, but is stopped by an angry Ortiz, and she states that she will talk only to Bauer. As Bauer interrogates her, Walsh demands immunity in exchange for cooperation, while claiming she assisted Mehran and his associates for the money, a claim that leaves Bauer angered, though Taylor ultimately signs the immunity, and Walsh gives Mehran's location. Russian Foreign Minister Mikhail Novakovich tells Taylor that Hassan's death will be an end to the upcoming treaty, which makes her believe that Russia does not want to sign it. Bauer, Walker and other agents arrive at Mehran's location, where the latter starts torturing Hassan to force him to confess for a series of crimes in a live broadcast, but despite the increasing lengths of torture, Hassan refuses to confess to any crime, and Mehran, realizing that Hassan will never follow his demand, is forced to announce the crimes himself. Bauer's team starts a shootout and Mehran is critically shot, but Bauer discovers that the broadcast wasn't live and that Hassan has already been executed, and Bauer is left distraught over his failure to save Hassan, while his execution is shown on TV and Taylor reluctantly reveals Hassan's death to Dalia and Kayla.
185	17	"Day 8: 8:00 a.m. – 9:00 a.m."	Milan Cheylov	David Fury	April 12, 2010	8AFF17	8.33
After Bauer expresses his disappointment over his failure to save Hassan, he chooses to depart CTU and tasks Ortiz with handling the transfer and interrogation of a captured and injured Mehran. Pavel Tokarev, a Russian operative, poses as an FBI agent and lethally injects Mehran, but he is recognized by Walker while leaving, and she tasks O'Brian to investigate him. Meanwhile, Hastings is dismissed for his incapabilities including the failure to save President Hassan and for mistakenly hiring Dana Walsh during the day, and O'Brian is appointed as the Interim Director. After Taylor initially considers giving up on the peace treaty in light of the recent tragedy, she and Jamot convince Dalia to take over from Hassan and sign the treaty, which is not accepted by Novakovich, but Kanin convinces Taylor to let former president Charles Logan, who has a long history with the Russians, persuade them to return. Bauer and Walker arrive at Bauer's apartment, where they share a peaceful moment together before engaging in passionate sex. Tokarev calls Novakovich, who is revealed to be involved in the day's events, and reports to him his intention to assassinate Walker and Bauer despite Novakovich being against the idea since their assassinations could draw attention. Using a sniper rifle, Tokarev critically shoots Walker, but fails to hit Bauer, who escapes his apartment and takes Walker to a hospital, but Walker ultimately succumbs to her wounds, leaving Bauer devastated.
186	18	"Day 8: 9:00 a.m. – 10:00 a.m."	Milan Cheylov	Chip Johannessen & Patrick Harbinson	April 19, 2010	8AFF18	8.94
O'Brian tells a heartbroken Bauer about the man Walker recognized, and Bauer heads to Bazhaev's bail court, where he threatens the rest of Bazhaev's family if he does not talk, forcing Bazhaev to reveal that the Russian government were involved in the day's events and Walsh was their agent. Logan pays a visit to Novakovich and reveals to him that he also knows the Russians were involved in the day's events, and forces him to sign the upcoming treaty by threatening to disclose the Russians' involvement. After initially not telling her how he forced the Russians when announcing that the Russians will sign the deal, Logan ultimately reveals the truth to Taylor and Kanin, and despite Kanin's disagreements, he ultimately convinces Taylor to cover up the story in order to reach the treaty. As Bauer offers Walsh another immunity in exchange for her evidence incriminating the Russian government, Taylor personally visits Bauer and announces her choice to not allow him to continue with his current investigation, stating that any evidence about the Russians' involvement in the day's events must be covered up in order to keep the peace treaty intact. Taylor tasks O'Brian to detain Bauer and transfer him outside CTU, but during transfer, Bauer manages to steal the chopper and escape, choosing to go rogue.
187	19	"Day 8: 10:00 a.m. – 11:00 a.m."	Michael Klick	Manny Coto & Brannon Braga	April 26, 2010	8AFF19	9.12
After managing to escape from pursuing choppers, Bauer embarks on his own mission to find the people behind Walker's death, starting with attempting to find Walsh and acquire from her the evidence against the Russian government, and calls his friend, Jim Ricker, ordering a series of weapons and tools for his plan. Bauer's escape causes Taylor to rethink her decision of covering up the story, but Logan comes up with an idea to deliver Walsh to private contractors, who can torture her to find and secure the evidence. Taylor quickly agrees to Logan's idea, but her decision disappoints Kanin, who chooses to resign; before leaving, Kanin advises Logan not to cross the lines, which Logan ignores. As Walsh is delivered to Logan's operatives, Bauer apparently convinces O'Brian to help him find the evidence, and she gives another location to Bauer, tasking Ortiz and his men to capture Bauer there. Having anticipated this, however, Bauer overpowers the agents and locks all of them down except Ortiz, whom he persuades to help him with his investigation, while Taylor holds a press conference announcing her intention to facilitate the treaty's signing no matter the cost.
188	20	"Day 8: 11:00 a.m. – 12:00 p.m."	Michael Klick	Teleplay by : Evan Katz & Alex Gansa; Story by : Alex Gansa	May 3, 2010	8AFF20	9.00
Ortiz tells O'Brian that he has captured Bauer and asks her about Walsh's location, which she divulges. Ortiz and Bauer arrive there and start a shootout, killing all the operatives and saving Walsh, who reveals that her evidence is in a safety deposit box in a bank. Meanwhile, at the press conference, Dalia gives her statement, while Logan and Novakovich decide to team up to contain the crisis. Logan's assistant, Jason Pillar, arrives at CTU and assumes command, challenging O'Brian's decisions to protect Bauer, and is tasked with giving Bauer's whereabouts to Tokarev once Bauer is located. Bauer, Ortiz and Walsh arrive at the bank, where Bauer stays outside while Ortiz and Walsh go inside, where she knocks him unconscious and recovers a memory card from the box, before calling the police about Bauer. Bauer manages to escape and capture Walsh in a construction site, where he recovers the card, but despite Walsh being unarmed and pleading for her life, Bauer chooses to execute her instead of capturing her, since Renee's assassination is still on his mind.
189	21	"Day 8: 12:00 p.m. – 1:00 p.m."	Milan Cheylov	Chip Johannessen & Patrick Harbinson	May 10, 2010	8AFF21	8.55
Bauer finds a video in the card showing Tokarev's involvement and sends Tokarev's photo to Ricker, who identifies him and promises to help Bauer capture him. Meanwhile, Ortiz is arrested and taken to CTU, where Pillar starts interrogating him, but he denies knowing anything useful. Bauer calls Reed and offers the evidence, arranging a meeting at a store; the call is intercepted by CTU and Pillar informs Tokarev while sending agents for help, but Bauer manages to escape with Reed while Ricker captures Tokarev, and Bauer gives the card to Reed, whom Ricker accompanies outside, leaving Bauer alone with Tokarev. Bauer starts brutally torturing him, demanding his superiors' identities while yelling at him for assassinating Walker, but Tokarev does not talk in spite of the increasing torture, and Bauer discovers that his SIM card is missing, deducing that Tokarev swallowed it. Bauer ultimately kills Tokarev by dissecting him and extracts the card from his torso, puts it in the cell phone, and finds Logan's number in it, learning that Logan is involved with the current events.
190	22	"Day 8: 1:00 p.m. – 2:00 p.m."	Milan Cheylov	David Fury	May 17, 2010	8AFF22	8.95
CTU finds Tokarev's body butchered, and O'Brian begins to worry about Bauer, who attacks Logan's motorcade in a vicious shootout and manages to get to Logan without killing any security guards using his body armor. He ultimately forces a frightened Logan out of the bulletproof limousine by throwing a smoke bomb inside and abducts him to a secluded place, where Logan gives Novakovich's name. Bauer soon attacks Novakovich's hotel room and kills him and his bodyguards. As Russian president Suvarov arrives in New York City to sign the treaty, he gets a call from Logan, and Suvarov is revealed to be the mastermind behind the day's events, including the assassinations of both President Hassan and Renee, and Bauer hears the conversation using a bug he secretly planted on Logan when he attacked him and his security detail. Meanwhile, Reed calls her boss and tells him about the video, but Logan convinces Taylor to order the FBI to confiscate the video before it is disclosed. Reed calls and tells Kayla about the Russians before she is arrested and the card is seized, while O'Brian frees Ortiz and tasks him to find Bauer through Ricker.
191	23	"Day 8: 2:00 p.m. – 3:00 p.m."	Brad Turner	Shauna McGarry & Geoff Aull	May 24, 2010	8AFF23	8.94
Bauer infiltrates the building across from the U.N. in Pillar's car by holding him at gunpoint, and forces Pillar to stitch his wound. Pillar asks Bauer why he is embarking on a revenge mission instead of breaking rules for a good cause, to which he responds that he is seeking justice on his own after Taylor chose not to allow him to do so, but chooses to spare Pillar's life, instead knocking him unconscious. As Bauer proceeds to the upper floor and prepares his sniper rifle, Ortiz convinces Ricker to help him find Bauer, while Kayla reveals to Dalia about the Russians being involved with President Hassan's assassination. Dalia then asks Taylor about the truth, and she confirms it, but then demands that she not withdraw from the treaty by threatening to attack Kamistan in retaliation of its alleged involvement in the day's events. Jamot convinces Dalia not to withdraw, while Suvarov arrives and finds out about Dalia's knowledge. Bauer records a video of himself explaining his crimes before continuing with his goal, while O'Brian finds Bauer and is knocked unconscious by him. Suvarov holds a press conference while Logan gets a call from Bauer, who is watching him by his rifle in the opposite building, and Bauer demands that Logan call Suvarov and bring him to his room as soon as the press conference is over.
192	24	"Day 8: 3:00 p.m. – 4:00 p.m."	Brad Turner	Howard Gordon	May 24, 2010	8AFF24	8.94
As Suvarov arrives at Logan's room, O'Brian attempts to dissuade Jack from killing him as the Russians would declare war if their president was assassinated on U.S. Soil, promising to disclose Jack's evidence in order to ensure Suvarov's prosecution, and after O'Brian asks if Renee would've wanted him to do this, Jack is finally persuaded and stops his quest for revenge, allowing Suvarov to leave Logan's room. He gives his memory card containing the evidence and his recorded video, the latter intended for Kim, to O'Brian, convincing her to shoot him in order to avoid her own arrest. Jack is arrested and O'Brian leaves with the card, which is later seized on Pillar's order, and Logan gives it to Taylor and convinces her to have Jack killed. Taylor watches Jack's recorded video, which shows him giving a speech explaining his actions and his reasons for committing them, which moves Taylor to tears. At the official treaty signing ceremony, Taylor, Dalia and Suvarov arrive to sign the treaty, but after Dalia and Suvarov sign their names, Taylor starts to have an epiphany and ultimately decides not to sign it, announcing all the crimes that happened during the day and promising due process. Watching Taylor's decision on TV, Logan realizes that Bauer has ruined his goals once again and suffers a breakdown, killing Pillar and attempting to commit suicide by shooting himself; he ends up surviving, but the doctors reveal he'll spend the rest of his life suffering from brain damage. During transport, Jack is abducted by Logan's operatives, but Taylor calls them and demands that they let Jack go, revealing to him that she did not sign the peace treaty and that the truth about the ones responsible for the day's events will be exposed. She apologizes to him for her betrayal, saying she'll resign and willingly face the consequences, and warns him that both the Russian and U.S. governments will be after him for his crimes and the assassination attempt on Suvarov. Knowing that he must leave the country, Jack has a final phone conversation with O'Brian, telling her to look after Kim and her family and thanking her for sticking by his side over the years, before ultimately saying goodbye and preparing to go on the run.

== Production ==
Starting with episode 18, Chip Johannessen was promoted to executive producer by the production company Imagine Television. An interview with Kiefer Sutherland seemed to indicate that season eight would take place within very close proximity to the closing events of season seven, but ultimately the story picked up more than a year after the events of the previous season. The show got permission to shoot in the UN building in New York City but Kiefer Sutherland said that they would "probably use that primarily for exteriors".

=== Trailer ===
In October 2009, the debut trailer for Season 8 aired on Fox. It was titled "Survive" and hinted that the eighth season would be the last with the line "All Jack Bauer has to do is survive one more day." The trailer shows Jack relaxing with his family and being warned about the impending threat to President Hassan's life. On November 26, 2009 a second trailer was released which featured the song "Run This Town" by Jay-Z.

== Reception ==
On the review aggregator website Metacritic, the eighth season scored 67 out of 100, based on 19 reviews, indicating "generally favorable" reviews. On Rotten Tomatoes, the season has an approval rating of 75% with an average score of 7.4 out of 10 based on 40 reviews. The website's critical consensus reads, "It often feels like the same ol', same ol', but as Jack Bauer, Kiefer Sutherland continues to deliver in 24's final day(s)."

Gregory Itzin, who played former president Charles Logan this season, was nominated for Best Guest Actor in a Drama Series, four years after getting the nomination for Best Supporting Actor in a Drama Series. The series also received the nomination for the Television Critics Association Heritage Award. In a review by IGN, the writing in Season 8 was compared negatively to the writing in other seasons with "It's always difficult to see a once vibrant and exciting show clearly drop in quality...the 24 writers simply didn't play fair – because there was no way the Dana from the beginning of the season could have been the Dana we saw later...This plot twist took an already frustrating character and made her even more of a mess."

=== Award nominations ===
Organization	Category	Nominee(s)	Result
Primetime Emmy Awards	Outstanding Music Composition for a Series, Dramatic Underscore	Sean Callery	Won
Primetime Emmy Awards	Outstanding Sound Editing for a Series	William Dotson, Cathie Speakman, Pembrooke Andrews, Jeffrey Whitcher, Shawn Kennelly, Melissa Kennelly, Daryl Fontenault, Jeff Charbonneau, Laura Macias, Vince Nicastro	Won
Primetime Emmy Awards	Outstanding Guest Actor in a Drama Series	Gregory Itzin	Nominated
Primetime Emmy Awards	Outstanding Stunt Coordination for a Drama Series	Jeff Cadiente	Nominated
Primetime Emmy Awards	Outstanding Sound Mixing for a Comedy or Drama Series, One Hour	William Gocke, Mike Olman, Ken Kobett, Larold Rebhun	Nominated
Television Critics Association Awards	Heritage Award		Nominated

== Home media releases ==
The eighth season was released on DVD and Blu-ray in region 1 on December 14, 2010 and in region 2 on November 8, 2010.
