= Meri Jung =

- Film poster
- Directed by: Subhash Ghai
- Written by: Javed Akhtar
- Produced by: N. N. Sippy
- Starring: Anil Kapoor; Meenakshi Sheshadri; Nutan; Javed Jaffrey; Amrish Puri; Parikshat Sahni
- Cinematography: Kamalakar Rao
- Edited by: Waman Bhonsle; Gurudutt Shirali
- Music by: Laxmikant-Pyarelal
- Release date: 11 October 1985
- Running time: 164 mins
- Country: India
- Language: Hindi

Meri Jung (transl. My War) is a 1985 Indian Hindi-language legal drama film produced by N N Sippy and directed by Subhash Ghai. The film stars Anil Kapoor, Meenakshi Sheshadri, Nutan, Amrish Puri, Javed Jaffrey (in his debut film), A. K. Hangal, Iftekhar, Kushboo and Parikshat Sahni. The films music is by Laxmikant Pyarelal.

== Plot ==
The story begins with a happy lower-middle-class family – Arun Verma(Anil Kapoor) an 8-year-old boy, his sister Komal Verma (Khushboo) a 5-year-old girl, his mother, Aarti Verma (Nutan) and his father, Deepak Verma (Girish Karnad) – living a peaceful life. Arun's parents teach their children through the famous title song "Zindagi Har Kadam Ek Nayi Jung Hai, Jeet Jayenge Hum, Jeet Jayenge Hum Tu Agar Sang Hai" which means that life is full of problems at every step and still we will overcome all these if we are together.

Deepak Verma is trapped in a murder case. A famous criminal lawyer G.D. Thakral (Amrish Puri) proves him guilty, and he is sentenced to be hanged by the court. Pleas by Arun's mother fail to convince Thakral to be truthful and spare her husband. Thakral asks her to give evidence for his innocence, to which she sadly quotes "Jiske paas koi sabut, koi gavanh nahi hote kya we begunah nahin hote" ("one who does not have any proof or witness of innocence, are they not innocent?"). Thakral was adamant to let her husband be hanged. He was hanged as per court's decision. His mother becomes mentally unstable from shock and is sent to a mental institution. Later Advocate Gupta (A.K. Hangal), the lawyer who defended Arun's father, finds out that Thakral had known all along that he was innocent, but only wanted him to be hanged. Arun finds out that Thakral abused the law.

Arun's house and all his property is auctioned off by the court. Arun and his sister are not offered help. He grows up with the seeds of revenge in his heart. He becomes a successful defence lawyer and keenly follows every case of Thakral so that some day he can stand up in court against the unbeaten Thakral and beat him.

One day Geeta Srivatsav (Meenakshi) comes to him and asks him to fight the case of her sister, Dr. Asha Mathur (Beena Banerjee) who is accused of killing a patient on duty with her medicine, which she gave from her purse. Arun refuses saying that if she can produce even an iota of evidence of her sister being innocent he will fight for her. Geeta replies coincidentally the same sentence "Jiske paas koi sabut, koi gavanh nahi hote kya we begunah nahin hote." Arun is instantly reminded of his mother's pleadings before Thakral. Geeta storms out of his office, but Arun is convinced to take the case. He meets Asha Mathur in police custody. He learns from her that on that fateful night she got a call from her ward assistant that her patient is in the ICU and needs her. She stops on the way (due to a traffic jam), and she impatiently moves out of car her to ask the reason. Meanwhile, somebody replaces the medicine bottle with the look-alike bottle of poison from her purse. On arrival in the hospital, she gives the liquid from that bottle to stabilise the patient. This resulted in the patient's death.

It is shown that Asha Mathur's husband, Dr. Dinesh Mathur (Parikshat Sahni), had gone to meet Thakral and had asked him to fight his wife's case. Thakral says no claiming he is very busy at the moment but later tells his assistant that there is no way that this case could be won. Arun meets Dinesh Mathur and informs him that he will fight the case. He asked him about the nature of poison and for how long a person can sustain the poison; he learns that poison if might result in death within 2 to 15 minutes depending on the body resistance.

The case begins with the prosecution lawyer recounting the events of that fateful day and telling that the medicine given to the patient was actually poison. Arun defends the case says that the patient did not die of this medicine. To prove himself right he drinks the medicine in court and refutes the claim. The court declares Geeta's sister innocent. Just after the judgement Dr. Mathur rushes Arun to hospital. It is revealed that the medicine contained poison, and Arun is saved in the nick of time.

Dr. Mathur wants to appreciate and compensate Arun for the risky effort he took to save his wife. He calls him for a get-together in his mansion. Dr. Mathur gives Arun a blank cheque. Arun rejects the offers politely and says he did for his self-satisfaction. He then finds the same piano with the sticker of Bhagwat Geeta of Krishna which his father used to play and was auctioned. His memories are refreshed again and with the emotional request he tells Dr. Mathur that this piano is very significant to him and asks for it. Dr. Mathur very happily gives the piano and asks him the reason for accepting this small fees. He tells the Mathur family his tragic story. He says that his mother was never seen after his father's death, and he assumes that she is dead.

Geeta calls Arun on a beach to appreciate his efforts and kindness at the canteen. They both fall in love. Thakral's son Vikram Thakral (Javed Jaffrey), a spoilt brat, not knowing anything about Arun, teases Geeta, which irritates the couple. Soon things take an ugly turn and Arun beats up Vikram.

Dr. Mathur sees a photo of his mother hanging in the wall. She immediately recognises the face with the patient she is handling for mental disorders. Arun and his sister request them to take to her. In the mental hospital they see their mother. Her memories had stopped on the day of the incident; she feels that their children are eight and five, staying with father. Arun brings her mother to his house and tries to make her come back to normal; she resumes her memory on hearing the song "Zindagi Har Kadam..."

Vikram plans to trap Arun's sister Komal and learns she studies in the same college to exact revenge. He tries to impress her by his charms, dancing skills, and ways of flattering people. The plan works. Komal falls for him and he convinces her to run away with him (so that he can publicly defame Arun by leaving his sister). At the planned moment, when one of Vikram's ex-girlfriends, Indu Gupta, shows up and tells Komal of Vikram's evil intentions. In the ensuing argument, Vikram murders Indu which is witnessed by the Dr. Mathur's family.

Arun had been waiting for this moment to take revenge on Thakral. He steps in as the prosecutor against Thakral who is defending his son. The case moves to and fro and, in the end, Arun has the upper hand. Thakral kidnaps Arun's mother and attempts to blackmail him. Arun goes to save his mother and is beaten up by Thakral's goons. Even though injured, Arun fights back. In an attempt to shoot Arun, Thakral shoots his friend's son and is jailed. He is unsuccessful in saving his son, who is given the death penalty. Thakral becomes a mentally unstable person.

Arun and his family are happy again and sing the famous "Zindagi Har Kadam Ek Nayi Jung Hai" song.

== Cast ==
Actor/Actress	Character
Anil Kapoor	Arun Verma
Meenakshi Sheshadri	Geeta Srivatsav, Arun's love interest
Khushboo	Komal Verma, Arun's sister
Nutan	Aarti Verma, Arun and Komal's mother
Girish Karnad	Deepak Verma, Arun and Komal's father & Aarti's husband
Amrish Puri	G. D. Thakral
Beena Banerjee	Dr. Asha Mathur, Geeta's sister
Parikshat Sahni	Dr. Dinesh Mathur, Asha's husband and Geeta's brother-in-law
Javed Jaffrey	Vikram Thakral (Vicky)
A. K. Hangal	Advocate Vinay Gupta
Viju Khote	as Damodar Sharma , Arun Verma,s asistant
Pradeep Rawat	Government Advocate Balwant

== Soundtrack ==
#	Title	Singer(s)
1	"Zindagi Har Kadam"	Lata Mangeshkar, Nitin Mukesh
2	"Zindagi Har Kadam Ek Nai Jung Hai – 1"	Lata Mangeshkar, Shabbir Kumar
3	"Bol Baby Bol Rock-N-Roll"	Kishore Kumar, Javed Jaffrey, S. Janaki
4	"O Mere Khwabon Ke Shehzade"	Anuradha Paudwal
5	"Zindagi Har Kadam Ek Nai Jung Hai – 2"	Lata Mangeshkar
6	"Jhoom Le Jhoom Le"	Laxmikant Kudalkar, Subhash Ghai

== Remakes ==
Year	Title	Language	Cast
1986	Vijrimbhana	Telugu	Sobhan Babu
1987	Oru Thayin Sabhatham	Tamil	T.Rajendar
1989	Yuddha Kanda	Kannada	V Ravichandran

== Awards and nominations ==
33rd Filmfare Awards

Won

- Best Supporting Actor – Amrish Puri
- Best Supporting Actress – Nutan

Nominationed

- Best Film – N. N. Sippy
- Best Actor – Anil Kapoor
- Best Music Director – Laxmikant–Pyarelal
- Best Lyricist – Anand Bakshi – "Zindagi Har Kadam"

== Reception ==
The movie was critically acclaimed, with special praise heaped upon Amrish Puri and Anil Kapoor. The movie established Kapoor as a mature actor with a lot of talent, shedding his newcomer image.
