= Anil Kapoor =

Indian actor and film producer (b. 1956)

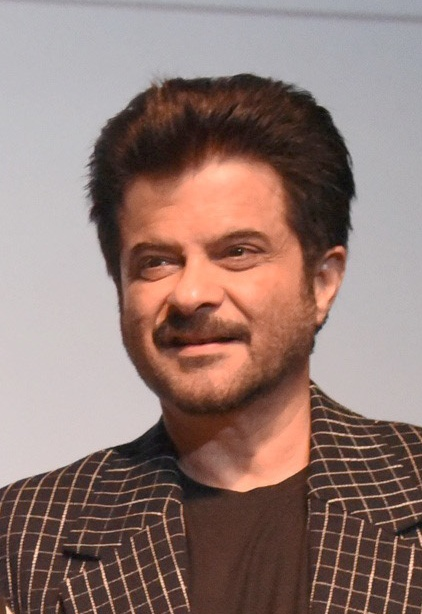
- Kapoor in 2018
- Born: Anil Surinder Kapoor; 24 December 1956 (age 69); Bombay, Bombay State, India
- Education: St. Xavier's College
- Occupations: Actor; film producer
- Years active: 1979–present
- Works: Full list
- Spouse: Sunita Bhavnani (m. 1984)
- Children: Sonam; Rhea; Harsh Varrdhan
- Father: Surinder Kapoor
- Relatives: Kapoor family
- Awards: Full list

Anil Surinder Kapoor (born 24 December 1956) is an Indian actor and producer who works primarily in Hindi films, in addition to Indian television and international films. In a career spanning over 40 years, Kapoor has appeared in more than 100 films. He has received several accolades, including two National Film Awards and seven Filmfare Awards.

Born to film producer Surinder Kapoor, Anil made his Bollywood debut with a small role in the romance Hamare Tumhare (1979) before starring in the Telugu film Vamsa Vruksham (1980) and Kannada film Pallavi Anupallavi (1983). His first three successes were Mashaal (1984), Woh 7 Din (1984) and Meri Jung (1985), which made him a star. He went onto establish himself as an actor with highly successful ventures, throughout the 1980s and 1990s, such as Saaheb (1985), Mohabbat (1985), Karma (1986), Mr. India (1987), Tezaab (1988), Ram Lakhan (1989), Rakhwala (1989), Parinda (1989), Kishen Kanhaiya (1990), Lamhe (1991), Beta (1992), Laadla (1994), 1942: A Love Story (1994), Judaai (1997), Virasat (1997), Deewana Mastana (1997), Biwi No.1 (1999), Hum Aapke Dil Mein Rehte Hain (1999) and Taal (1999).

Kapoor continued his streak of successful movies and powerful performances with some challenges as a lead actor in early 2000s. He then came back with the multi-starrers No Entry (2005) and Welcome (2007), both of which were superhits. This was followed by supporting roles in Race (2008), Race 2 (2013), Shootout at Wadala (2013), Dil Dhadakne Do (2015), Total Dhamaal (2019), Jugjugg Jeeyo (2022), Animal (2023), and Fighter (2024). Kapoor's first international film role was in Danny Boyle's acclaimed drama Slumdog Millionaire (2008). He has since starred in the eighth season of the action series 24 in 2010 and played a brief role in Mission: Impossible – Ghost Protocol (2011). In Indian television, he has starred in the remakes 24 (2013–2016) and The Night Manager (2023).

== Early life ==
Anil Surinder Kapoor was born into a Punjabi Hindu family affiliated with the Arya Samaj on 24 December 1956 in Chembur to Nirmal Kapoor and film producer Surinder Kapoor. The family belongs to the greater Kapoor show business family. He is the second of four children. His elder brother, Boney Kapoor is a film producer and younger brother Sanjay Kapoor is an actor. Actress Sridevi and the producer Mona Shourie Kapoor, both Boney's wives, were his sisters-in-law, and Sandeep Marwah, founder of the Noida Film City and owner of Marwah Studios, is his brother-in-law. The film actors Arjun Kapoor, Mohit Marwah and Ranveer Singh are his nephews, while actresses Janhvi Kapoor and Khushi Kapoor are his nieces. Prithviraj Kapoor was his father's cousin.

Kapoor was educated at Our Lady of Perpetual Succour High School, Chembur, and at the St. Xavier's College, Mumbai.

== Acting career ==
Kapoor made his debut in films in 1970, playing a younger version of Shashi Kapoor's character in Tu Payal Mein Geet. The film, however, did not release theatrically.

=== 1979–1980s: Rise and establishment ===
Anil Kapoor made his Hindi film debut with Umesh Mehra's Hamare Tumhare (1979), in a small role. He then starred as a lead actor in the 1980 Telugu film, Vamsa Vruksham directed by veteran Bapu. In the same year, he also appeared in two more Hindi films – Ek Baar Kaho and Hum Paanch. In 1981, he appeared in M. S. Sathyu 's Kahan Kahan Se Guzar Gaya. After playing a small role in Shakti (1982), he made his Kannada film debut with Mani Ratnam's debut directorial Pallavi Anu Pallavi (1983). He played his first Hindi film leading role in Woh Saat Din (1983) which was directed by Bapu and featured Padmini Kolhapure and Naseeruddin Shah. He gained recognition in Bollywood with Yash Chopra's action drama Mashaal (1984) as a tapori, for which he won his first Filmfare Award for Best Supporting Actor. His tapori persona and stubble look was considered unconventional at the time, but would become fashionable in India many years later. Kapoor's 1985 releases included Yudh and Saaheb. Yudh featured him uttering his iconic line "Ek Dum Jhakaas". But it was Meri Jung (1985), wherein he played the role of an angry young lawyer fighting for justice that earned him his first nomination for the Filmfare Award for Best Actor.

He then played a comic tapori again in Karma (1986), the biggest hit of the year.

He was the protagonist in Shekhar Kapur's sci-fi film Mr. India (1987), the biggest hit of the year. The film became one of his biggest box-office hits and shot him to stardom. In 1988, he won his first Filmfare Award for Best Actor for his performance in the film, Tezaab, the biggest blockbuster of 1988. The same year also saw the release of Kasam, an action drama directed by Umesh Mehra. The following year, he delivered Ram Lakhan (which became the second-highest box office earner of 1989) featuring Madhuri Dixit in the chartbuster song One Two Ka Four. In Rakhwala, Kapoor played the role of a tapori, and the film was declared a success. Kapoor's portrayal of an autistic man in Eeshwar (1989) was well-received and established his versatility as an actor, earning him his third nomination for the Filmfare Award for Best Actor. He went on to star again alongside Jackie Shroff and Madhuri Dixit in the crime thriller Parinda (1989), his last film of the year, one of the highest grossing films of 1989.

=== 1990s: Career fluctuations ===
The year 1990 saw him play a dual role, as twin brothers in the highly successful action comedy Kishen Kanhaiya and the same year, he further attained reasonable box-office success with Ghar Ho To Aisa. Kapoor came up with a critically acclaimed performance in Awaargi. Many critics called that his best performance ever but the film flopped at the box office. Also films like Jamai Raja and Jeevan Ek Sanghursh, which were remakes of South Indian films, turned out to be semi hits.

This was followed by a highly praised performance as a middle-aged man in Yash Chopra's intergenerational musical romantic drama Lamhe (1991), opposite Sridevi, which won her the Filmfare Award for Best Actress, with Kapoor earning his fourth nomination for the Filmfare Award for Best Actor. The film proved to a landmark film of Indian cinema and Yash Chopra's best work to date. It was the first film in which he appeared without a moustache. Although the film was an underwhelming success at the domestic box-office, it proved to be a major success overseas. Anil Kapoor's 1991 releases, Benaam Badsha was accorded average status at the box office.

In 1992, Kapoor received his second Filmfare Award for Best Actor for his hard-hitting performance in Indra Kumar's Beta – the biggest blockbuster of the year opposite Madhuri Dixit. In 1993, Boney Kapoor's much-delayed mega-budget, Roop Ki Rani Choron Ka Raja was a disappointment at the box-office, however the film gained a cult status over the years. Another success in these years was Laadla (1994) again alongside Sridevi, a film produced by Nitin Manmohan. Kapoor gave a splendid performance as a simpleton lover in the musical romantic drama 1942: A Love Story opposite Manisha Koirala. Kapoor earned his sixth nomination for the Filmfare Award for Best Actor for his performance in the film. His other 1994 release, Andaz, opposite Juhi Chawla and Karisma Kapoor, was also a success. His 1995 release, Trimurti was a box-office disaster, though Kapoor's performance was positively received, earning him his second nomination for the Filmfare Award for Best Supporting Actor.

After a few down tides at the box-office, he had successes with films like Loafer (1996), opposite Juhi Chawla. In Judaai, Kapoor's depiction of a loving husband torn between his two wives was appreciated and the film fared well at the box-office. Deewana Mastana (1997), Biwi No.1 (1999) and Hum Aapke Dil Mein Rehte Hain (1999) were also box office hits, with Biwi No. 1 earning him his first nomination for the Filmfare Award for Best Comedian. Kapoor's unusual characterisation of a zealous, crooked musical superstar in Taal (1999) shocked both audience and critics alike, earning him rave reviews, in addition to his second Filmfare Award for Best Supporting Actor. He again won rave reviews for his performance in Virasat (1997), a remake of the Tamil film, Thevar Magan (1992), in which he played Kamal Haasan's role. The film proved to be a major box office success, and earned him his first Filmfare Award for Best Actor (Critics), in addition to his seventh nomination for the Filmfare Award for Best Actor. He also starred in Jhooth Bole Kauwa Kaate, which was filmmaker Hrishikesh Mukherjee's last directorial, along with Juhi Chawla. He shaved his moustache once again for the second half of the film.

=== 2000s: Transition to character roles ===
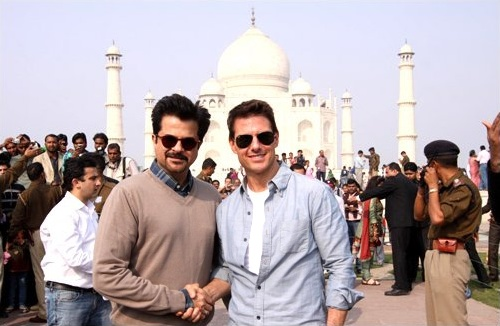
Kapoor with Tom Cruise at Taj Mahal, Agra

Anil Kapoor's first release of 2000 was Bulandi, in which he played a double role, showing restraint and maturity as the elder Thakur. He won his first National Film Award for Best Actor, in addition to his eighth nomination for the Filmfare Award for Best Actor for his performance in Rajkumar Santoshi's critically acclaimed Pukar (2000). Kapoor again achieved critical and commercial success with Hamara Dil Aapke Paas Hai (2000). Kapoor performed as Rajeev in the much delayed Karobaar (2000), a film directed by Rakesh Roshan, where Kapoor's dialogue delivery was appreciated. He delivered a powerhouse performance in Shanker's Nayak (2001), which is considered to be his career-best performances.

In 2002, Kapoor performed in the role of a fat man in Badhaai Ho Badhaai, a takeoff from the Hollywood hit, The Nutty Professor. He performed in the Indra Kumar directed film Rishtey. In Om Jai Jagadish, he gave a performance described as "first-rate" by one critic. Kapoor shared the screen with Bollywood actor Amitabh Bachchan for the first time in Armaan, and played the character of a neurosurgeon.

In his 2003 release, Calcutta Mail, according to PlanetBollywood.com, he delivered "one of his best performances. His character was defined with ample scope to perform in this screenplay-driven performance and in spite of the strong supporting cast, this really came out as Kapoor's one-man show." According to Bollywood Hungama, he "ignited the silver screen with an authoritative performance" in Musafir alongside Sameera Reddy, Aditya Pancholi, Sanjay Dutt and Koena Mitra. Kapoor performed as the stricken husband in the thriller My Wife's Murder, which he also produced. Anees Bazmee's super-hit comedy No Entry (2005), followed for Kapoor that year. The film went on to become the highest-grossing film of the year, earning him his second nomination for the Filmfare Award for Best Comedian. He was also in the film Bewafaa, playing a rich businessman who is forced to marry the sister of his wife after she passes away in childbirth.

Kapoor played a grey character in the 2005 thriller, Chocolate. Anil's first release of 2007 Salaam-e-Ishq: A Tribute to Love was a box office hit in overseas though a flop in India. Anees Bazmee's Welcome, which released on 21 December 2007 was declared the biggest success of the year, earning him his fourth nomination for the Filmfare Award for Best Supporting Actor. Kapoor's understated performance in Subhash Ghai's Black & White was highly lauded. His first release in 2008, Abbas Mustan's thriller, Race became a box-office hit. Vijay Krishna Acharya's Tashan marked Anil's comeback to Yash Raj Films, but failed to do well at the box-office.

His first English language film, Slumdog Millionaire, which was released on 12 November 2008. Yuvvraaj was released on 21 November 2008. Yuvvraaj, with Salman Khan and Katrina Kaif, failed to do well at the box-office. On the other hand, Slumdog Millionaire has won a number of international awards and received rave reviews from critics, costing only US$15 million to produce, but pulling in more than $352 million worldwide. In January 2009, he attended the 66th Golden Globe Awards ceremony along with the team of Slumdog Millionaire, which won four Golden Globe Awards. Kapoor demonstrated his well-known enthusiasm after Slumdog won the Academy Award for Best Picture (one of eight awards). He also received a nomination for Best Ensemble at the Black Reel Awards of 2008 and has won the Screen Actors Guild Award for Outstanding Performance by a Cast in a Motion Picture.

=== 2010–present: Subsequent success ===
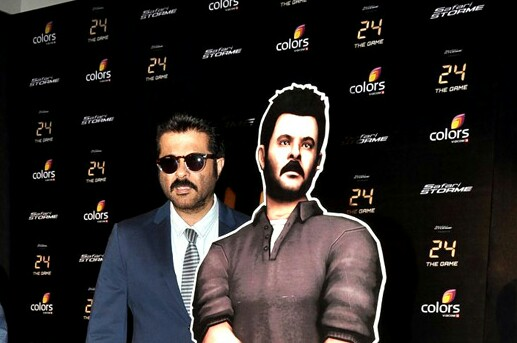
Kapoor at 24 video game launch

In 2010, Kapoor starred in the eighth season of the American television series 24, portraying Omar Hassan, President of the fictional Islamic Republic of Kamistan. He made an appearance as a Mumbai-based media tycoon in the Hollywood tentpole Mission: Impossible – Ghost Protocol (released in December 2011). He was cast in Power, which was to be directed by Rajkumar Santoshi but was shelved for unknown reasons.

Anil Kapoor's only release of 2012 Tezz earned him favourable reviews from critics; Taran Adarsh wrote that "...it's a treat watching Anil Kapoor on screen. Though the actor has been an integral part of so many movies in the past, you can never accuse him of repeating himself. Besides, he may be in his early 50s, but that hasn't deterred Anil from performing the high-octane action stunts with flourish."

His performance in Shootout at Wadala was highly acclaimed by critics; Sudhish Kamath of The Hindu wrote that "Anil Kapoor is first-rate, revelling in a tailor-made role as a no-nonsense cop, reminding us of the superstar he used to be in the Eighties." In January 2013 Kapoor became the first Indian actor to be invited for a special segment; "In conversation", at the Toronto International Film Festival, an honour which is reserved for actors having considerable body of work. Beginning in 2013, he starred in the lead role of Jai Singh Rathod in the Indian remade series of 24.

In 2015, he starred alongside an ensemble cast of Shefali Shah, Priyanka Chopra, Ranveer Singh, Anushka Sharma and Farhan Akhtar in Zoya Akhtar's family comedy-drama Dil Dhadakne Do, which proved to be a commercial success and received positive reviews, earning Kapoor his third Filmfare Award for Best Supporting Actor.

In September 2015, Kapoor made an appearance as himself in an ad for the Angry Birds Friends tournament Champions for Earth. Amazon cast Kapoor in its pilot The Book of Strange New Things, to play the role of Vikram Danesh, the authoritative head of the base on Oasis. Kapoor reprised his role of Majnu Bhai in the crime comedy Welcome Back (2015), the sequel to Welcome (2007). Featuring an ensemble cast that included reprising actor Nana Patekar and new additions John Abraham and Shruti Hassan among others. It opened to mixed reception but emerged as another success.

In 2017, he starred with his nephew, Arjun Kapoor, in Anees Bazmee directed romantic comedy Mubarakan. Kapoor played dual roles, one of which was a turbaned Sikh. The following year, he appeared in Race 3 (2018), the third instalment in Race franchise. Although Kapoor was in the first two films, his Race 3 character was new to the series. The film was moderately successful despite generally negative reception. In the same year, Kapoor portrayed the titular character in Fanney Khan, a remake of Belgian film Everybody's Famous! (2000). Alternatively, he voiced Baloo for the Hindi dub version of Mowgli: Legend of the Jungle (2018).

2019 was a busy year for Kapoor as he played supporting roles in the coming-of-age romantic dramedy Ek Ladki Ko Dekha Toh Aisa Laga, adventure comedy Total Dhamaal, sports drama The Zoya Factor, and starred in the action comedy Pagalpanti. In Ek Ladki Ko Dekha Toh Aisa Laga and The Zoya Factor, he worked alongside his daughter Sonam Kapoor, with the former's screenplay being selected by the Academy of Motion Picture Arts and Sciences for its library's core collection, due to its concept of female homosexuality. On the other hand, Total Dhamaal became a hit.

Kapoor kicked off the decade alongside Aditya Roy Kapur in the prison thriller Malang (2020). Kapoor played a corrupt police inspector and was praised for his performance. Malang became a commercial success. He next played a fictional version of himself in black comedy AK vs AK, alongside Anurag Kashyap. The names "AK" in the title are the initials of the two leads. Directed by Vikramaditya Motwane, the film was released on Netflix to positive reviews, with Kapoor's performance receiving particular praise as one of the best of his career. This also marked Kapoor's first time working with his son Harsh Varrdhan Kapoor.

In 2022, Kapoor starred with Harsh Varrdhan Kapoor in the western thriller Thar, produced by Netflix. His portrayal of a 1980s police inspector, earned high praise despite mixed reviews for the film, earned him the Filmfare OTT Award for Best Supporting Actor in a Web Original Film. He played a hedonistic, unfaithful husband and irresponsible father in the family dramedy Jugjugg Jeeyo. Tushar Joshi of India Today called him the film's standout performer, while Taran Adarsh of Bollywood Hungama deemed him "flawless," noting his skilful balancing of dramatic highs and lows. This role earned him his record setting fourth Best Supporting Actor award at the 68th Filmfare Awards.

Kapoor co-produced and made a cameo in female sex comedy Thank You for Coming (2023), which premiered at the 2023 Toronto International Film Festival (TIFF) in the Gala Presentations section, but turned out to be a financial failure. In the 2023 action film Animal, directed by Sandeep Reddy Vanga, Kapoor played a powerful industrialist and strict father to Ranbir Kapoor's character. The controversial film became one of the highest-grossing Indian films of all time and Kapoor's highest-grossing Indian film to date, earning him another Filmfare Award nomination for Best Supporting Actor.

He then starred in Siddharth Anand's Fighter, alongside Hrithik Roshan and Deepika Padukone. The film fictionalises the 2019 military events between India and Pakistan, including the Pulwama attack, the Balakot airstrike, and the subsequent border skirmishes. It was a hit, topping overseas box office charts. He later starred in action thriller Savi (2024), also featuring Divya Khosla and Harshvardhan Rane. It was an adaptation of 2008 French film Anything for Her.

Following Fighter, Kapoor paid tribute to the Indian Air Force on Air Force Day in October 2024. In October 2026 he publicly praised Indian captain Smit Machchhar for helping save passengers during an attack aboard a Flydubai flight from Dubai to Tel Aviv, wishing him a speedy recovery.

Kapoor appeared in the YRF Spy Universe film War 2 (2025) as the Chief of RAW Colonel Vikrant Kaul. He reprised this role in the seventh instalment in the universe, Alpha (2026), starring Alia Bhatt, Sharvari, and Bobby Deol.

== Other work ==
=== Producing ===
In 2002, Kapoor produced his first film, the comedy Badhaai Ho Badhaai, in which he also starred. It was followed by My Wife's Murder (2005), and Gandhi, My Father (2007). Gandhi, My Father focuses on the relationship between Mahatma Gandhi and his son Harilal Gandhi and was awarded the National Film Award – Special Jury Award. He produced the film Shortkut: The Con Is On starring Akshaye Khanna and Arshad Warsi. In 2010, he produced Aisha (2010), starring his daughter Sonam Kapoor and Abhay Deol. The film performed moderately at the box-office, grossing Rs. 155 million in its theatrical run.

He has acquired the remake rights for the American TV series, 24, reportedly for an amount of INR 1 billion. It took him about 1.5 years to license the rights to create an Indian rendition of the popular TV show. Kapoor will be stepping into the protagonist's (Jack Bauer) role as well. Kapoor played the role of President Hassan in the 8th season of the original series aired on Fox Network. Kapoor co-produced the female sex comedy Thank You for Coming (2023).

=== Singing ===
Anil Kapoor has on rare occasions contributed to the soundtracks of his movies as a singer. One of his first playback songs was the title track of the 1986 Bollywood comedy Chameli Ki Shaadi. The song was comic in nature and depicted the love story of the titular Chameli and her lover Charandas, played by Kapoor. Chameli was portrayed by Amrita Singh. In the same decade, he was credited on the song "Tere Bina Main Nahin Mere Bina Tu Nahin" for the film Woh Saat Din. He is also credited on the song "I Love You" from Hamara Dil Aapke Paas Hai. In 2008, Kapoor provided a rhyme-like-dialogue to introduce his character in Yashraj's Tashan. His theme was titled "Bhaiyaji ka Tashan". His co-stars in the movie also had their introductions incorporated in the soundtrack, which was composed by Vishal–Shekhar. Akshay Kumar's theme was titled "Bachchan Pandey ka Tashan". Kareena Kapoor's was "Pooja ka Tashan". Saif Ali Khan was credited for "Jimmy ka Tashan". He had one full album, "Welcome" as a co-singer with Salma Agha in 1986. The album was scored by Bappi Lahiri.

== Personal life ==
In 1984, Kapoor married Sunita Bhavnani, a costume designer with whom he has two daughters and a son. Bhavnani is the cousin of Ranveer Singh's mother. Their elder daughter Sonam Kapoor (born 1985) is a former actress and their younger daughter Rhea Kapoor (born 1987) is a film producer while their son Harsh Varrdhan Kapoor (born 1990) is an actor. Kapoor is referred to as ‘AK’ by his children.

For financially exploiting his name, appearance, and voice, as well as the slogan "jhakaas" (the Marathi word for wonderful), which became associated with him after he used it in one of his films, Kapoor sued a number of websites and platforms in 2023.

== Awards and recognition ==
Kapoor has been one of the most popular and successful actors of Hindi cinema. Known for his performance in films of various genres, he is also one of the few Indian stars to make a mark in mainstream Hollywood with films like Slumdog Millionaire (2008) and Mission: Impossible – Ghost Protocol (2011). Kapoor appeared in Box Office India's "Top Actors" list four times from 1988 to 1990 and 1992. In 2022, he placed in Outlook India's "75 Best Bollywood Actors" list.
