= Woh Saat Din =

Woh 7 Din
- Poster
- Directed by: Bapu
- Written by: Jainendra Jain (dialogue)
- Based on: Andha 7 Naatkal by K. Bhagyaraj
- Produced by: Surinder Kapoor; Boney Kapoor
- Starring: Anil Kapoor; Padmini Kolhapure; Naseeruddin Shah
- Cinematography: Baba Azmi
- Edited by: N. Chandra
- Music by: Laxmikant–Pyarelal
- Distributed by: S. K. Film Enterprises
- Release date: 12 August 1983
- Country: India
- Language: Hindi

Woh 7 Din (transl. Those Seven Days) is a 1983 Indian Hindi-language romantic drama film directed by Bapu. Produced by Surinder Kapoor and Boney Kapoor, it stars Anil Kapoor, Padmini Kolhapure and Naseeruddin Shah. It was Anil Kapoor's first lead role in a Hindi movie. The film is a remake of the 1981 Tamil film Andha 7 Naatkal directed by K. Bhagyaraj. The director of this movie, Bapu, had earlier directed the Telugu version Radha Kalyanam (1981). The music was done by Laxmikant Pyarelal while Anand Bakshi wrote the lyrics.

== Plot ==
Maya (played by Padmini Kolhapure) attempts suicide on the day of her nuptial night. Dr. Anand (played by Naseeruddin Shah), Maya's husband, finds out that she attempted suicide. When Maya gains consciousness, she confides in Dr. Anand, saying she did not want to get married and was forced into the marriage.

The story moves to a flashback, where a new singer, Prem (played by Anil Kapoor) and his sidekick Master Raju, come to Maya's house. It is love at first sight for Maya as she falls for the naive, innocent Prem. However, Prem, aspiring to be a true musician, rejects Maya's advances. Although Prem is in love with Maya, he believes that he is not worthy of her. They declare their love for each other and plan to elope, but destiny has other plans in store for Maya and Prem. On the day of their elopement, the lovers are caught by Maya's parents. As a result, Prem and his sidekick are kicked out of the house, and Maya is forced to wed Dr. Anand.

The plot moves to the present, where Dr. Anand confides in her that he only married her due to his ill mother, Savitri (played by Dina Pathak). Dr. Anand promises to unite the two lovers after his mother's death. During her stay with Dr. Anand, Maya gets attached to Dr. Anand's daughter (played by Suchita Trivedi). Meanwhile, Dr. Anand searches for and finds Prem. When his mother dies, Dr. Anand attempts to reunite Prem and Maya. However, Prem, being a strong believer in the traditional Indian values of marriage and fidelity, says he can accept if his lover becomes someone's wife, but cannot accept if someone's wife becomes his lover.

Prem asks Maya to remove the mangalsutra from her neck so that Maya would be his former Maya. Maya cannot, as she is a simple Indian girl with traditional values. Then Prem asks Dr Anand to remove the Mangalsutra from Maya's neck. When Dr Anand attempts to do this, Maya doesn't allow him to do so.

Prem then reaffirms that marriage is a lasting bond, and that Maya should be with Dr.Anand as they have married each other. He wishes both of them well and leaves. The film ends with a scene showing Prem making his way in the dark to the sound of his harmonium. It is left to the viewers to believe that Prem sacrifices his love for greater values and returns to his life of poverty, simplicity, and loneliness.

== Cast ==
- Anil Kapoor as Prem Pratap Patiyalewala
- Padmini Kolhapure as Maya
- Naseeruddin Shah as Dr. Anand
- Satish Kaushik as Kishan
- Nilu Phule as Maya's Nana
- Jagdeep as Ganga Prasad
- Raju Shrestha as Chhotu
- Dina Pathak as Savitri
- Arvind Deshpande as Dr. Anand's Father
- Ashalata Wabgaonkar as Maya's Mother
- Suchita Trivedi as Dr. Anand's Daughter
- Javed Khan Amrohi
- Neena Gupta

== Music ==
Lyrics: Anand Bakshi

1. "Mere Dil Se Dillagi Na Kar, Dil Dhadk Gaya Toh Kya Hoga" – Kishore Kumar, Anuradha Paudwal
2. "Pyar Kiya Nahi Jata Ho Jata Hai" – Lata Mangeshkar, Shabbir Kumar
3. "Anari Ka Khelna Khel Ka Satiyanas" – Asha Bhosle
4. "Kangana Oye Hoye Kangana" – Lata Mangeshkar, Shabbir Kumar
5. "Payaliya" – Suresh Wadkar, Kavita Krishnamurthy
