= Critical reaction to 24 =

Response to American TV series

The Fox Network television series 24 has won numerous Emmy Awards for its technical and artistic merits, and become part of American popular culture. Jack Bauer and David Palmer are seen as iconic television characters. It has also been heavily criticized for justifying the misuse of government authority and the use of torture, and accused of being racially insensitive.

== Critical reception ==
24's real time story-telling method and split-screen technique have also received widespread praise and critical acclaim. This aspect of the show also made it hard to produce from a creative point of view because there was no possibility to do time cuts; as a result, characters needed to be changing locations (e.g., driving or flying) for the same amount of time as it would take for the actual, fictional journey. This aspect of show design and production led to an increasing expectation of suspension of disbelief by the viewer.

=== Season 1 ===
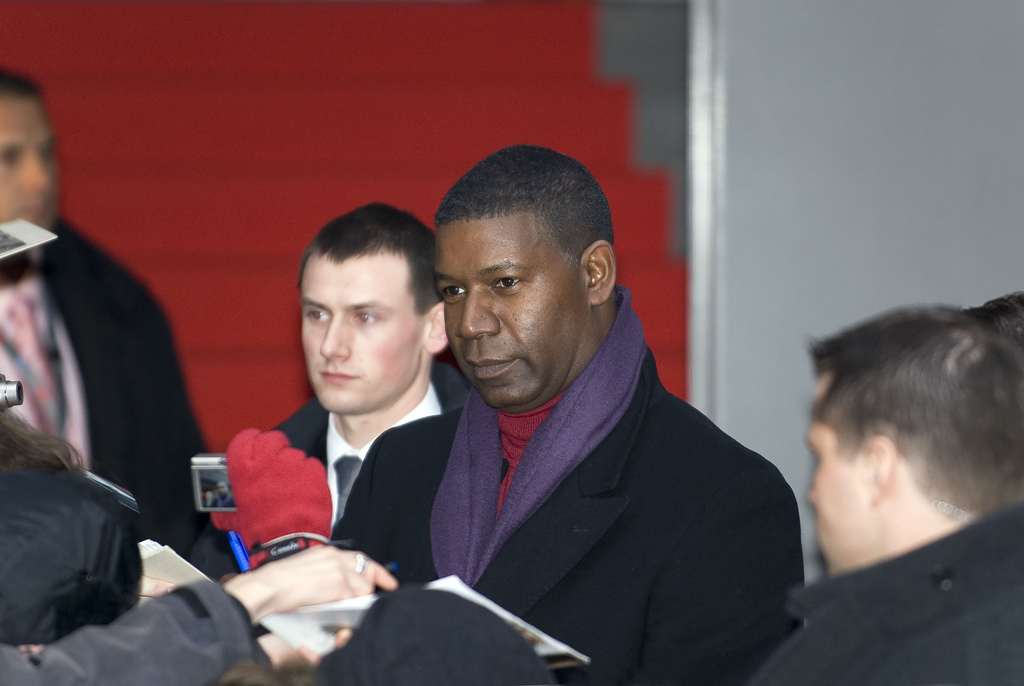
Dennis Haysbert received praise from critics for his portrayal of David Palmer.

The first season of 24 received universal critical acclaim and was featured on the cover of TV Guide as the "best new show of the season". The premiere episode was cited by The New York Times as a "Critic's Pick" by Caryn James, who noted that it was "a drama sleek, suspenseful and absorbing enough to overcome its blatant gimmick". She added that of the 2001 fall season's new government series that "24 is the most daring and promising" and that "Mr. Sutherland is an unexpectedly sympathetic hero". Ain't It Cool News gave the premiere episode five stars, saying it features "Loads of edgy, complex, compelling characters. Intricate, unpredictable plotting. Lightning-like pacing. A stellar cast. A near-constant, electric undercurrent of sex. It keeps asking questions you'll be dying to see answered. And, perhaps best of all, it feels like no TV show you've ever seen."

Time magazine praised the series, saying "Forget sleeping through this one—you won't even want to blink. 24 is the most distinctive, addictive new TV series this season. As an old-fashioned thriller, it's relentless, tense and deliciously paranoiac, with more twists than a Twizzler. But it's also boldly different. Most notably, there's its clever visual signature: picture-in-picture screens that show two, three and even four different scenes simultaneously." Time also noted that "The show takes to the next level the trend of serial story "arcs," which began with '80s dramas like Hill Street Blues and Wiseguy and which continues on The West Wing and The Sopranos." Time also praised the performances of Kiefer Sutherland and Dennis Haysbert, saying that "It helps that there's a strong cast driving the train. Haysbert is commanding, if a tad underutilized in the pilot, as an idealist with a dangerous secret. And Sutherland plays the gravel-voiced Bauer with an assurance that belies his teen-movie-star past; his overstressed agent is stalwart but weary, a haunted spook."

TV Barn called the first episode "not to be missed", adding that "Although there really are only two main story lines, each episode has no fewer than six stories to keep track of, full of suspense and action-packed (without seeming like a big-bang action movie). There's a lot going on in 24, but you have to pay attention to truly appreciate it. I predict 24 will have a lot of viewers' undivided attention this fall."

While the first half of the season was highly praised, a major subplot in the second half of the season revolving around Teri Bauer becoming overcome with trauma and losing her memory was "savaged by TV critics". USA Today mentioned the plotline a full three years later during a story on a similar plotline in the first season of Lost, mentioning that "Fox's 24 took a beating by critics in the first season when Jack's wife, Teri Bauer, was stricken with amnesia. Later, producers said it seemed the only option for sustaining her character but not destroying other plotlines." In fact, the amnesia plotline was based on something that had actually happened to series director Stephen Hopkins.

The finale of Season One is seen by many critics as one of the best episodes of the series, featuring possibly the most defining moment of the entire series. One character's death at the end of the season was voted by TV Guide as the second most shocking death in television history, behind only Henry Blake from M*A*S*H. The season finale is frequently cited as one of the best television season finales of all-time.

=== Season 2 ===
In an interview in the UK Kiefer Sutherland said the second season was thanks to the British viewship. Anticipation was high for the second season, as many critics were skeptical whether the writers could come up with another story to carry 24 hours of television. Season Two, however, received near-universal critical acclaim. Of the second season, Kiefer Sutherland said "Jack doesn't really care anymore." Sutherland continued with, "Whatever boundaries he had last year are pretty much gone now. Last year's promo was great: 'I'm federal agent Jack Bauer, and today is the longest day of my life.' Now maybe it's 'I'm federal agent Jack Bauer, and today is the most violent day of my life."

Entertainment Weekly reported that the writers had "concocted a horrendously topical terrorism story line for their emotionally damaged, trigger-giddy protagonist to tackle. Bauer wasn't exactly Mr. Warmth last season, but now the grieving agent makes Andy Sipowicz look like Andy Griffith" and called the second season an "addictive, adrenaline-fueled thriller". USA Today praised the returning series, saying "What hasn't changed is 24's knack for the unexpected or its ability to pull you into its often shocking world. Believe me, by the end of the first hour, you'll know Jack is back, and you'll be eager to see where he's headed next. Looks like another great day" One scene in the premiere of Season Two has become regarded as one of the most memorable and shocking in the entire series. In it, Bauer brings child molester "Marshal Goren" into the CTU offices, and ultimately shoots him dead; then, crouching down and inspecting Goren's head, Bauer then tells his boss, "I'm going to need a hacksaw".

In a review of the season, IGN said that "overall the second season moves at a much brisker pace, is definitely topical, contains some excellent performances, and never lets you down in the thrills department." Another DVD reviewer said that "I enjoyed season one of this inventive show. When I found out it had been picked up for another season, the only question left in my mind was "Will they be able to match the first season?" When this season started, I had my answer. They surpassed it with flying colors."

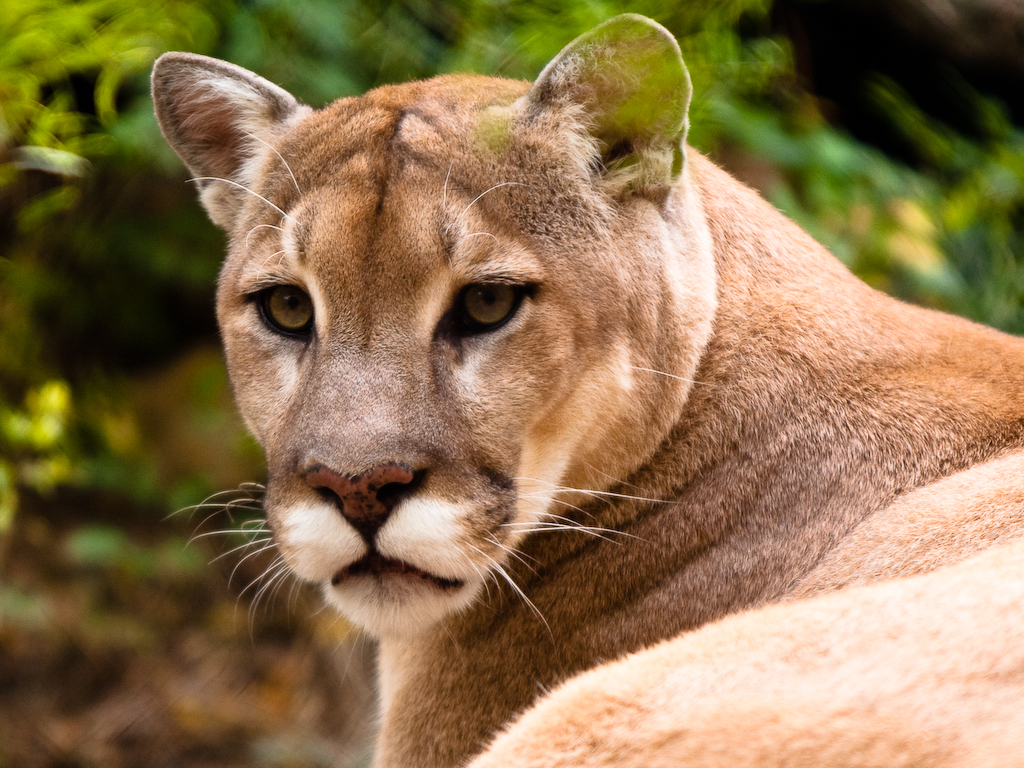
One scene in Season 2 where Kim Bauer meets a cougar in the forest has become symbolic of some of the show's forays into poor subplots. The cougar is a popular in-joke among fans and critics.

The Kim Bauer subplot received heavy criticism from fans and critics. One reviewer said, "Kim's story arc, as she runs from an overheated domestic situation to an escape from the police to a loony's basement bomb shelter—and worse (almost getting eaten by the aforementioned cougar)—operates almost as the comedy relief for an otherwise unrelentingly grim litany of violence and political turmoil that fills the other major plotlines. As silly as Kim's escapades are on their own, when placed in context, they are almost necessary to put Jack's solemn mission into sharp relief. Of course, you have to treat Kim's story as droll humor for this to work, which may not be the intentions of the producers. Fortunately, the rest of the story works pretty well without her." PopMatters said that "Definitely less well rounded, much like last season, Kim's annoying storyline stumbles from calamity to calamity. Again, she's caught up in serial dangers, so that her box is always about to break out into chaos: dashing about in her tight little top, she's always in dire need of Jack's help (that said, she does eventually come into her own, and proves wholly capable of the sort of "red meat" violence for which her father is infamous)."

=== Season 3 ===
The first half of the third season was met with positive reviews, while reception to the second half of the season received critical acclaim. Season Three opens in a significantly different place than Season Two. The decision to pick up three years after Season Two and ignore Season 2's cliffhanger was criticized by fans and critics. The character of Kate Warner was dropped from the cast between seasons. One change, meant to address concerns from Season 2, was to move Kim into the Counter Terrorist Unit. Ain't It Cool News said that "Kim's role at CTU is a terrific antidote for those who maintain an abiding lust for Elisha Cuthbert, but little patience for Kim Bauer's inane predicaments."

The New York Times said of the premiere that, "One of the best series on television is 24, and it could be even better if there were less of it—if, say, the world had adopted the time-keeping system of the ancient Sumerians. The show would then be called 12 and its hero, Jack Bauer (Kiefer Sutherland), could save the country from an apocalyptic terrorist attack in a 12-hour day—eliminating the need for some of the sillier side plots delaying the denouement. (How many times can a daughter be kidnapped, found, then captured again?)

An IGN reviewer noted that Season Three is "also the season unfortunately in which the show starts to show a little bit of creakiness, especially in relation to Kim Bauer, the interoffice politics of the CTU, and Jack Bauer's superhero status." PopMatters said that, "24 now seems an efficient thrill machine that repeatedly threatens to veer off in cockamamie plot torques: in taking such risks, it's not always perfect, but it is consistently admirable and frequently excellent fun." and noted that "as before, the storylines come together and apart with smart editing, elliptical writing, and charged up split screens."

The last half of Season Three is frequently mentioned as one of the best runs in the history of the series. One reviewer for DVDTalk said, "If you would have asked me what I thought about the third season of 24 eight episodes into it, I would've told you it sucked. Why? Because the first third of season three feels a little too much like the previous seasons. In other words, it's really nothing new. It's the same old same old. However, it turns out that this is far from the truth, because the third season contains enough twists and turns (in the last two thirds of it) to make it almost as exciting as the earlier two seasons. In the end, while similar approaches are taken in seasons one and two, they are different enough that they are still very entertaining. I guess what works, works and the third season definitely works."

USA Today said of the back half of the season, "Here's the good news, and not a minute too soon: Returning tonight after a month's absence, 24 has rediscovered its footing and is preparing to shock, thrill and hook us with some of its best twists yet. The all-too-dreary faints and dodges are behind us. The virus is out, and thousands of lives are on the line. Even in a less-than-perfect season, of course, 24 has come up with some satisfying moments, many of them involving an increasingly lethal Jack. (Who knew he could snap someone's neck with his legs?) Still, stranding Jack on a Mexican drug dealer's ranch for weeks on end was a major mistake. The story was far too commonplace to support a show that thrives on the far edges of reality."

An episode in Season Three where Jack is ordered by a terrorist to kill a colleague of his is often regarded as one of the best episodes of the series, and the second highest-rated episode by fans on IMDB.com (behind the Season One finale).

=== Season 4 ===
Season Four was met with positive reviews. While many critics and fans argue that it is weaker than the first three seasons, the show won many new fans due to a new timeslot, uninterrupted season, and a two-night four-hour premiere.

The New York Times reported that the show "still holds some surprises" and approved of the cast overhaul, but called the new cast choices "disappointing", noting that "24 made a point of seeking out unfamiliar, interesting actors, in particular Dennis Haysbert, who played President David Palmer. Mr. Devane, a craggy television war horse who seems to have played every Kennedy except Rose, is more of a distraction than an asset" and Kim Raver as "generically pretty but has nothing special to bring to the role of Audrey". Nevertheless, The New York Times praised the decision to keep Chloe O'Brian (Mary Lynn Rajskub), calling her the "right one" to keep.

The increase in the use of torture was noticed by critics, with PopMatters reporting that Season 4 is known as the "torture season". PopMatters also pointed out that "While the action is jumping throughout the season, the thematic throughline has to do with loss. Everyone from Jack to Marwan to Audrey loses some sense of dignity, certainty, and hope, not to mention faith in the state's capacity to sustain order." IGN said that, "After the meandering plot of Season Three, this year's narrative proves far more focused and hard-driving; some episodes begin with more action before the first commercial break than feature films have in their finales" and that "while there are a few flies in the honey, this is still an excellent season".

Ain't It Cool News called it the "strongest and most consistent" season to date. One TV Guide reader bemoaned the supporting cast's lack of emmy luck, complaining that, "the Emmys let so many great actors slip through the cracks. They've managed not to nominate Penny Johnson Jerald, Sarah Clarke, Xander Berkeley, Dennis Haysbert, Reiko Aylesworth and Carlos Bernard, and now they've decided to omit Shohreh Aghdashloo and Mary Lynn Rajskub among others." Shohreh Aghdashloo's performance is cited by many critics as a highlight of the fourth season.

=== Season 5 ===
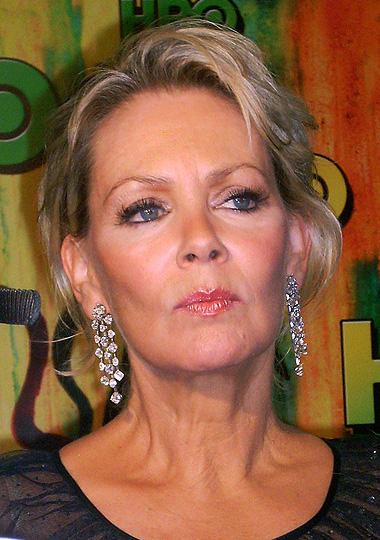
Jean Smart's performance as Martha Logan was admired by critics and fans.

Season Five received overwhelming critical acclaim, and is frequently cited by fans and critics as the best and most consistent season of the series, with the possible exception of Season One. The series received its highest ratings during this year, and won Outstanding Drama Series at the 58th Primetime Emmy Awards, over Grey's Anatomy, House, The Sopranos and The West Wing. Kiefer Sutherland took home Outstanding Lead Actor in a Drama Series, while supporting cast members Gregory Itzin and Jean Smart also received nominations.

The New York Times reported that the fifth season "provides an irresistible blend of iPodish computer wizardry and "Perils of Pauline" cliffhanger suspense" and that it is one of the few shows "that are sophisticated and also have a childish appeal". USA Today called the four-hour premiere "extraordinary" and the fifth season as the series at its "fast, furious, exaggerated best, filled with well-drawn subsidiary characters and rapid-fire surprises, all held in place by Kiefer Sutherland's great, under-sung performance as Jack." The Hollywood Reporter reviewer Tim Goodman, usually a heavy critic of the series, said "Damn. Having seen the first four episodes, you need to be a part of this. You need to doff the skepticism and get on the ride." The Chicago Sun-Times said of Season Five that "TV shows don't elicit such high praise often enough. But the fifth season of this filmlike thriller is metaphorically knocking my socks off."

Gregory Itzin's portrayal of President Charles Logan was universally praised by critics, with many comparing his character to former U.S. President Richard Nixon. The New York Times called Logan's administration as "the government on TV, that is, which is in turn a projection of our very worst fears." The character of Martha Logan was equally acclaimed, with the character's opening scene (in which she, unsatisfied with her hairdo, dunks her head into a sink) called "the most memorable character debut in "24" history". One reviewer said, "only thing viewers might not have been able to anticipate was that this season's break-out character would be a high-strung, sharp-tongued and off-her-meds first lady of the United States". The writers have admitted that the character was based on Martha Beall Mitchell, wife of Nixon's attorney general.

=== Season 6 ===
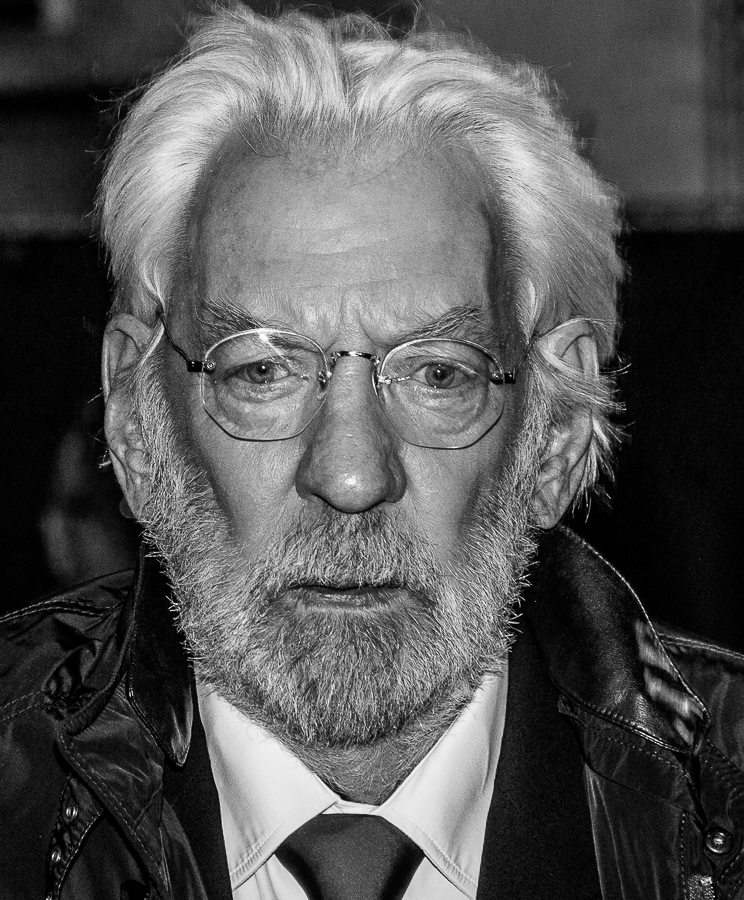
Donald Sutherland was offered the role of Phillip Bauer, but did not want a role in which he would face off against his own son

Season Six received mainly mixed reviews from both critics and fans, and is seen as an astounding fall in quality from Season Five. Though the premiere episodes were highly praised, backlash intensified in the second half of the season. BuddyTV voted it the "worst show of 2007", while also noting that the opening four hours were "downright exhilarating". Jack's torture of his own brother, Graem Bauer, drew attention to the show's extreme portrayal of violence, and criticism was aimed at the series' over-reliance on plot devices used in prior seasons, such as a nuclear threat, the attempted assassination of a president, the invocation of the 25th amendment, and Jack's attempt to save someone with whom he was romantically involved. The deaths of main cast members also came under scrutiny.

Critic Alan Sepinwall said early in the season that "several critics have started condemning this season as some kind of fiasco", while reporting that he didn't see "this season as being substantially worse than any other". Later in the season, Sepinwall said the show had devolved into "self-parody".

The storyline involving Jack's family was universally reviled. James Cromwell, who played Jack's father Phillip Bauer, did not enjoy his time on the series, complaining that "I had never seen 24. My agent said (the producers) asked me to do an arc on the show and that a lot of people watch it and it would be a good thing to do. But my character was bizarre. Not knowing the show, I went to the producers and said, 'Look, this guy kills his one son, attempts to kill his grandson for his...legacy? Are there any redeeming qualities to this character at all?' They looked me as though I was speaking Greek. Where's the human being in this guy?" The Phillip Bauer character was originally written for Kiefer Sutherland's real father, Donald Sutherland, who turned it down as he did not want to play a villainous father to his real-life son, suggesting instead that Phillip and Jack have a situation similar to Indiana Jones and his father in Indiana Jones and the Last Crusade.

Co-producer David Fury has gone on record to admit that the production team made several mistakes in the long-term plotting of direction of Season 6; this played a large part in their decision to end the "Suitcase Nuke" plotline early and dedicate the final seven episodes to a different storyline. Fox President Peter Liguori said: "We've really heard what the loyal audience has said to us. The good news is simply this: It has really fueled the show runners to be more daring with what they're going to do next year." In another interview, Howard Gordon confirmed that Season 6 could be "the last iteration of [the series] in its current state."

=== 24: Redemption ===
The television movie 24: Redemption garnered widespread critical acclaim from film critics. Alessandra Stanley of The New York Times gave the film a positive review, stating that Redemption is "a more sober, stripped-down version of 24, and that's refreshing," and that it was the first time a terrorist threat did not take place in Southern California, and the depiction of the conflict in Sangala is highly realistic and compelling. Stanley also said that a two-hour version of 24 proves that downsizing isn't always a bad thing. Mary McNamara of the Los Angeles Times praised the film, acknowledging the producers taking on board the criticism and moral issues regarding the use of torture, and stated that a group of innocent young children running for their lives "instantly ratchets up a story's emotional level."

Brian Zoromski of IGN rated it "good", 7.5 out of a possible 10. Zoromski stated that the purpose of Redemption was to allow the introduction of new characters for the seventh season. He further praised the action scenes involving Bauer on his own, stating it as a "sort of Die Hard in Africa," and called the change of setting from Los Angeles a "refreshing change of pace". However, Zormski criticized the film for containing sludge dialogue and bland scenes, but suggested that it makes up for it with the action scenes and emotional scenes involving Bauer, allowing Sutherland to show his acting range. Oscar Dah; of BuddyTV stated that the film should make up for the critics' poor outing of the sixth season, and has said that the film works wonderfully as the start of the seventh season, and praised Robert Carlyle's performance.

In addition, some reviews had mixed responses. Simon Brew of Den of Geek rated Redemption 3 out of 5 stars, praising it for showing a more human side of Bauer, the acting of Cherry Jones as Allison Taylor, and named Redemption as a solid bridge between season six and seven. However, Brew was critical that it plays little to no havoc with the world of 24, and that it is lacking at times in urgency. Gerard Gilbert of The Independent stated that the introduction of Jonas Hodges was promising, and praised Jon Voight's acting, as well as stating that the character is the one most to look forward to in the seventh season. Matthew Gilbert of The Boston Globe gave the film a negative review, giving it a 2 out of 10, calling it "un-fun", and stating that Bauer's character has not changed at all from past seasons, and asking, "When does a rogue hero [Bauer] become a tired joke? Based on this un-fun movie, I would say yesterday."

=== Season 7 ===
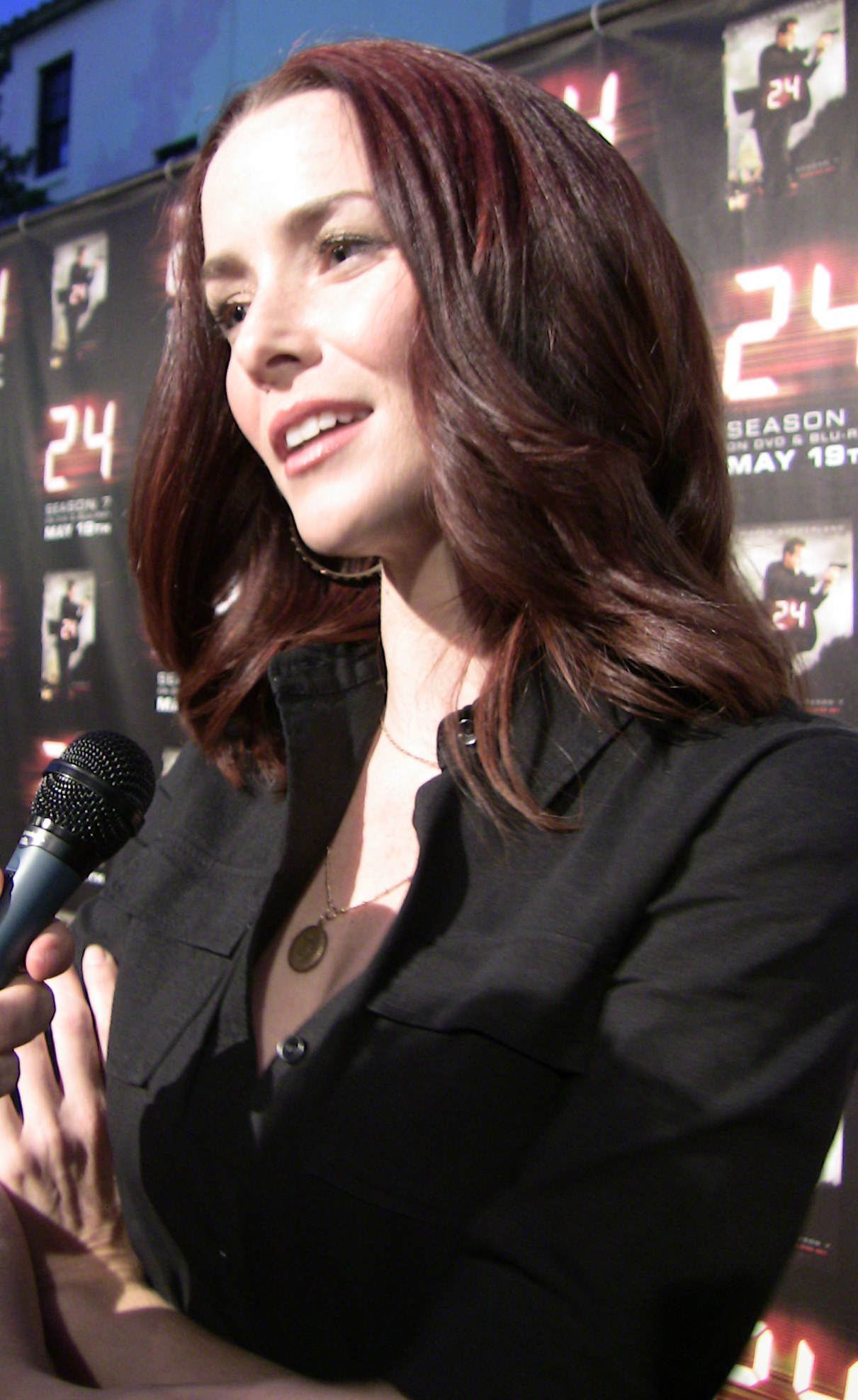
Annie Wersching, who portrayed Renee Walker, was one of the most well-received characters of Season Seven.

Season Seven received mixed reviews from critics and is regarded as a marked improvement over the disappointing Season Six. The show had been off the air for eighteen months, leaving critics and fans curious of the premiere. Producers re-tooled the show over break, relocating the series from Los Angeles to Washington, D.C., closing the Counter-Terrorist Unit, and, in the most controversial move, bringing fan favorite character Tony Almeida back from the dead. Time magazine said the most burning issue of the new season was "Does 24 still suck and if it does, how much?", and called the series "not as conservative as popularly portrayed". The reviewer did mention that "there are hopeful signs" for the new season. Tim Goodman wrote of Season Seven that "even before his inauguration, Barack Obama has brought change to America. He's made "24" pointless".

The new character of Renee Walker (Annie Wersching) received rave reviews in Season 7, even getting to be called the "Jack-girl" by fans. She has been seen as a highlight of the season. Cherry Jones won Best Supporting Actress at the 61st Primetime Emmy Awards for her role as President Allison Taylor in Season Seven.

The New York Times compared the opening of Season Seven to "being in a bar with a football superstar, eagerly awaiting tales of gridiron glory, only to have to listen to him drone on and on about the hypocrisy and injustice of steroid testing." USA Today called the eighteenth episode of the season "more than just a pivotal episode; it's a nearly ideal one, with some longed-for resolution, an emotional reconciliation, an exciting central sequence, and at least one surprise that's sure to leave you gasping", and asking "why can't Jack come back from near death? His show sure has."

The A.V. Club said the opener was "off to a terrific start", and "connects to earlier seasons without being slavishly committed to recreating them". After the season ended, The A.V. Club once again remarked, "The last months have been by turns ridiculous, exciting, irritating, and even a little thought provoking; and if nothing else, they've proven there's still some juice left in the formula. The season closes with Jack unconscious on a hospital bed, and Kim telling him she isn't ready to let go just yet. After a day like this, I mostly agree with her."

DVD Verdict said of the seventh season, "When looked at from start to finish, 24 Season Seven isn't the disaster everyone feared...but it certainly isn't the fresh new champion that people were hoping for, either. It's somewhere in the middle, with a very excellent two-thirds giving way to an awful, awful finish. The series has always prided itself on subverting people's expectations, and in this case it did: I expected it to end with a cool storyline and some memorable villains...and the writer's subverted my hopes by churning out five lame hours of television that cast a shadow over all the good things this season had going for it."

=== Season 8 ===
Season Eight received mixed reviews for its first half, but were more optimistic about the addition of Anil Kapoor as President Omar Hassan. However, reviews for the second half have been more positive. Maureen Ryan of the Chicago Tribune said, "it's kind of amazing to think about how long it took for the endless succession of cliffhangers to get old." She reviewed the series with dismay, ending with "24 just seems wan and tired to me. The show's few interesting actors get little to do and the new characters aren't that compelling. Pass." Salon.com came to the conclusion that, "after watching the first four hours, I can tell you that the eighth season of "24" does not look good. You know how much I adore this stupid show, but please, don't waste your time." The New York Times said that, "24 has stayed the course, for good and bad. The show that was once so innovative — in particular its real-time 24-hour countdown — has become creakily formulaic. The same elements — terrorists, counterterrorists (and, almost inevitably, a mole working for a high-level conspiracy), innocent bystanders and the president — are tumbled and reconfigured each season around the indispensable Bauer."

USA Today was disappointed with the new cast, but was excited for the return of old characters, saying "The only familiar face belongs to Mary Lynn Rajskub's belovedly difficult Chloe — though soon you'll be treated to the startling return of Annie Wersching's Renee Walker. Pray for that moment, because once Walker's story takes over in the fifth hour, it pulls Jack away from the CTU office, which is where most of the season's problems reside. Sackhoff has been saddled with a particularly weak plot and character. (Outside of Jones' president, must 24's women be so unhinged?) And Williamson's ridiculously obstructionist CTU boss is an eye-rolling drag."

The series finale was met with mixed reviews, with Los Angeles Times reviewer Mary McNamara mentioning that "24 managed to do what so many shows try and fail to do: Go out with not just a bang but its original convictions intact. Jack Bauer remains, to borrow the words of the immortal Harper Lee, one of those men born to do our unpleasant jobs for us." Mary McNamara also characterized the series as "an epic poem, with Jack Bauer in the role of Odysseus or Beowulf. Which means he needed to be fighting monsters, not essentially decent people who have made one very bad decision. And Logan was a terrific monster, the physical incarnation of all that Jack and 24 fought against for so long: political corruption and cowardice, narcissism and megalomania, ruthlessness and stupidity. Itzin, with his elastic, shape-shifting face and eyes so incandescently blue they appeared to be CGI'ed, made Logan a politician so murderously self-involved and loathsomely ambitious that the final episodes of the final season really did come down to a fight between good and evil."

BuddyTv.com called the finale a "dud". The reviewer, John Kucibek, mentioned that "when I think back on the series in the future, I probably won't even remember the ending. I'll remember Jack Bauer kicking ass and getting the job done, I'll remember the great presidents, from the noble David Palmer to the evil Charles Logan. I'll remember fallen CTU personnel like Tony Almeida, Ryan Chappelle, George Mason and Edgar Stiles. I'll remember the moles, the deaths, the torture, the terrorists and even Kim and the cougar. I'll remember the legacy of 24 as an action drama that redefined what serialized television can do and provided many shocking twists and turns along the way—the biggest one being the very real impact the show had on American foreign policy."

The New York Times said after the finale that "24 will live on, possibly as a feature film, and surely in classrooms and in textbooks. The series enlivened the country's political discourse in a way few others have, partly because it brought to life the ticking time-bomb threat that haunted the Cheney faction of the American government in the years after 9/11."

=== 24: Live Another Day ===
24: Live Another Day has received highly positive reviews. It currently holds an 84% "Fresh" rating with an average score of 7.4/10 on review aggregator site Rotten Tomatoes. Its synopsis cites this rating as a result of "strong action sequences" however it does criticize the season for its "familiarity and sameness". 24: Live Another Day has also received positive critical reception on Metacritic, with a score of 70, signifying "generally favourable reviews".

== Accolades ==
The series and its creators have been nominated for and won many awards, including:

- 2002 – Golden Globe Award for Best Actor, Kiefer Sutherland – Won
- 2002 – Emmy Award for Outstanding Writing for a Drama Series, Robert Cochran, Joel Surnow for Day 1: 12:00 a.m. – 1:00 a.m. – Won
- 2002 – Satellite Award for Best Television Series – Drama – Won
- 2002 – Satellite Award for Best Actor – Television Series Drama – Won
- 2002 – Satellite Award for Best Supporting Actress – Television Series, Sarah Clarke – Won
- 2002 – Screen Actors Guild Award for Outstanding Performance by an Ensemble in a Drama Series – Nominated
- 2002 - Television Critics Association Award for Program of the Year - Won
- 2002 - Television Critics Association Award for Outstanding New Program - Won
- 2003 – Screen Actors Guild Award for Outstanding Performance by a Male Actor in a Drama Series – Won
- 2003 – Satellite Award for Best Actor – Television Series Drama – Won
- 2003 – Writers Guild of America Award for Best Screenplay – Episodic Drama for Day 2: 7:00 p.m. – 8:00 p.m. – Won
- 2003 – Golden Globe Award for Best Supporting Actor, Dennis Haysbert – Nominated
- 2003 - Satellite Award for Best Supporting Actor – Television Series, Dennis Haysbert - Nominated
- 2004 – Golden Globe Award for Best Television Series – Drama – Won
- 2004 – Emmy Award for Outstanding Casting for a Drama Series – Won
- 2004 – Screen Actors Guild Award for Outstanding Performance by an Ensemble in a Drama Series – Nominated
- 2005 – Screen Actors Guild Award for Outstanding Performance by a Male Actor in a Drama Series – Won
- 2005 – Satellite Award for Best Supporting Actress – Series, Miniseries or Television Film, Shohreh Aghdashloo – Nominated
- 2006 – Emmy Award for Outstanding Drama Series – Won
- 2006 – Emmy Award for Outstanding Lead Actor in a Drama Series, Kiefer Sutherland – Won
- 2006 – Emmy Award for Outstanding Directing for a Drama Series, Jon Cassar – Won
- 2006 – Emmy Award for Outstanding Supporting Actress in a Drama Series, Jean Smart – Nominated
- 2006 – Emmy Award for Outstanding Supporting Actor in a Drama Series, Gregory Itzin – Nominated
- 2006 – Screen Actors Guild Award for Outstanding Performance by an Ensemble in a Drama Series – Nominated
- 2006 – Writers Guild of America Award for Best Screenplay – Dramatic Series – Nominated
- 2006 – Satellite Award for Best Supporting Actress – Series, Miniseries or Television Film, Jean Smart – Nominated
- 2007 – Emmy Award for Outstanding Lead Actor in a Drama Series – Nominated
- 2007 – Emmy Award for Outstanding Guest Actress in a Drama Series, Jean Smart – Nominated
- 2009 – Emmy Award for Outstanding Supporting Actress in a Drama Series, Cherry Jones – Won
- 2009 – Emmy Award for Outstanding Lead Actor In A Miniseries Or A Movie, Kiefer Sutherland for 24: Redemption – Nominated
- 2009 – Golden Globe Award for Best Actor – Miniseries or Television Film, Kiefer Sutherland for 24: Redemption – Nominated
- 2009 – Screen Actors Guild Award for Outstanding Performance by a Male Actor in a Miniseries or Television Movie, Kiefer Sutherland for 24: Redemption – Nominated
- 2009 – Satellite Award for Best Television Film – 24: Redemption – Nominated
- 2009 – Satellite Award for Best Supporting Actress – Series, Miniseries or Television Film, Cherry Jones – Nominated
- 2010 – Emmy Award for Outstanding Guest Actor in a Drama Series, Gregory Itzin – Nominated
- 2010 – Television Critics Association Heritage Award – Nominated

24 has also won many technical Emmy Awards including: Outstanding Single-Camera Picture Editing For A Drama Series, Outstanding Single-Camera Sound Mixing For A Series, Outstanding Stunt Coordination and Outstanding Music Composition for a Series.

== Controversy and criticisms ==
=== Depiction of Muslims ===
In the early seasons of the series, there was little-to-no criticism regarding the show's portrayal of Muslims. No Muslim terrorists were present during Season One or Season Three. Season Two features a wide range of sympathetic Muslims. Early in the season, a British Muslim-named Reza Naiyeer is accused of being a terrorist. It is revealed later in the season that the terrorist is actually his American fiancée. In another episode, one Muslim terrorist transporting the bomb changes his mind and tries to stop the attack before he is killed by another terrorist. The twelfth episode features an Imam who confronts Syed Ali, the head of a terrorist organization named Second Wave, over Syed's twisted interpretation of Islam.

The second half of the second season revolves around finding evidence to stop a war waged by the United States on three innocent Middle Eastern countries. A major theme during this arc revolves around the unjustified blame of Muslims for a terrorist bombing in the United States. A subplot involves President David Palmer attempting to quell Anti-Muslim sentiment and riots. In one episode, Palmer orders the National Guard to protect the Muslim community, telling his staff:

This is what the people are going to be watching. Let's show them how we are going to respond. I want them to see how we protect our citizens. We will not put up with racism or xenophobia. If this is where it's going to start, this is where it's going to stop.

A Muslim Intelligence Agent, Yusuf Auda, was added to the series late in the second season. His character was well received by fans of the series. Auda partnered with main characters Jack Bauer and Kate Warner against the Counter-Terrorist Unit, which was at the time seen by Bauer, Warner, and Auda as rushing into an unjustified war in the Middle East. An attack on Warner and Auda by anti-Muslim Americans resulted in Auda's death. As Auda died, Jack whispered the words, "I'm sorry, I'm sorry", the same thing he whispered when another character died in the first season.

Criticism of the show's depiction of Muslims began in Season Four, in which the main antagonists were Muslims affiliated with the fictional terrorist group Turkish Crimson Jihad. In the first episode of Season 4, a Muslim-American family is depicted to be among these, in which parents and their teenage son actively engage in a plot to kill Americans However, the son and the mother are both portrayed sympathetically later in the season. The writers of the show said in a special DVD feature that they countered this depiction of terrorist Muslims by showing opposing situations.

During this season, the Council on American-Islamic Relations issued a complaint that depicting Muslims as terrorists could "contribute to an atmosphere that it's OK to harm and discriminate against Muslims. This could actually hurt real-life people." Following this complaint, representatives from the Council on American-Islamic Relations and Fox met to discuss the matter, and an episode of the season began with a public service announcement by Kiefer Sutherland addressing these concerns, in which he stated that "the American Muslim community stands firmly beside their fellow Americans in denouncing and resisting all forms of terrorism. So in watching 24, please bear that in mind." Another episode of this season also portrays two Muslim American citizens aiding Jack Bauer with the intention of seeking retribution for the previous attacks by terrorists that day. Both brothers (and Bauer) survive a gunfight against American mercenaries.

In 2007, the American Islamic Community renewed its criticism of the series when it appeared that the main terrorists of the sixth season would, as in 2005, be Muslim. (It was later revealed that the Muslims in season 6 were being used by Russian radicals to take the fall for their agenda.)

In response to this criticism, FOX sent a statement to the Council on American-Islamic Relations, expressing that "Over the past several seasons, the villains have included shadowy Anglo businessmen, Baltic Europeans, Germans, Russians, Islamic fundamentalists, and even the (Anglo-American) president of the United States. Over the course of the series, no ethnic group has been singled out for persecution or blame."

Anti-Muslim sentiment in the public returns as a major theme in Season Six. The opening scene involves an innocent Muslim-American walking through Los Angeles while receiving suspicious and worried looks from White-American passerby. The Muslim-American is denied a seat on a city bus, which is subsequently bombed by an actual Muslim terrorist on board. A strong debate is featured between the Republican Chief of Staff Tom Lennox and the Democratic National Security Advisor Karen Hayes over the creation of Muslim detention facilities, which Hayes believed were "nothing more than concentration camps". President Wayne Palmer eventually sided with Hayes. This racial witch hunt also includes the wrongful arrest of the Director of the Islamic-American Alliance, who is eventually brought to the Muslim Detention Facilities. The Muslims imprisoned in the detention facility are portrayed as innocent and sympathetic. Another storyline revolves around main character and Muslim-American CTU Agent Nadia Yassir being racially profiled by Homeland Security. Nadia is later wrongfully tortured by the Counter-Terrorist-Unit.

Season Seven features very little Muslim involvement. In the later episodes of the season, an innocent Muslim is framed by the season's villain and forced to commit a terrorist attack. However, this man is later able to make contact with Jack Bauer, and risks his life to (successfully) avert the very attack he was meant to perpetrate. Ironically, he does so by holding up the WMD and shouting that he is a terrorist; the mass panic allows him to escape and deliver the WMD to Bauer, who disposes of it with seconds to spare. The season ended on a particularly benevolent note towards Muslims, since while Jack Bauer is dying he reaches out to an Imam featured earlier in the season to confess.

In addition, the main antagonists of 24's final season, Season Eight, are depicted as Russian government leaders and Muslim puppets. During the same season, Omar Hassan, the president of the fictional Islamic Republic of Kamistan, was trying to broker a peace treaty with the US when he was killed by opposing factions inside his own administration. In the series finale, both the presidents of the United States and Russia are portrayed as corrupt, while Hassan's successor is portrayed as benevolent.

During an interview for his new television series Homeland, Howard Gordon (the showrunner for Seasons 5-8) was asked about any regrets from his time on 24. Gordon mentions a billboard advertisement for the series. He notes it as a Season 2 advertisement, but the storyline he refers to is actually in Season 4. He said:

I actually do have regrets about one particular moment, which had more to do with the promotion of the show. In season two, the story involved a Muslim American family, and the father and the mother—and the son—were party to a terror plot. It was sort of a purple conceit in a way. But it was maybe a year and a half after 9/11, and on the 405 freeway there's this giant electronic billboard, and I think the line was: "They could be next door." The writers and the producers were not party to that campaign, but we quickly put an end to it, and realized how dangerous and potentially incendiary this show could be. And I think our awareness of that changed the way we approached the series. So I guess you could call it a regret, but it was really an epiphany.

=== Torture ===
The program routinely includes scenes of torture, both physical and psychological, and CTU is portrayed as employing several personnel exclusively for this purpose—characters Richards, Johnson, and Burke are only seen on-screen when they are torturing someone. Jack Bauer himself also tortures suspects both physically and emotionally.

In its first five seasons there were 67 scenes of torture—more than any other show on television, Melissa Caldwell, the Parents Television Council's Senior Director of Programs, said:

"24 is the worst offender on television: the most frequent, most graphic, and the leader in the trend of showing the protagonists using torture."

Subsequently, the PTC launched a campaign to try to persuade sponsors to stop buying airtime for 24, having named several episodes as "the worst television programs of the week"

The depictions of torture as effective and necessary have prompted considerable criticism from human rights activists, military officials, experts in questioning and interrogation, and even from fans of the series. The film Taxi to the Dark Side claims that the show popularizes torture. Stephen King, an admitted fan of 24, wrote,

"There's also a queasily gleeful subtext to 24 that suggests, 'If things are this bad, why, I guess we can torture anybody we want! In fact, we have an obligation to torture in order to protect the country! Hooray!' Yet Jack Bauer's face — increasingly lined, increasingly haggard — suggests that extreme measures eventually catch up with the human soul."

People affiliated with 24, as well as many of its fans, have responded to this criticism by stressing that the show is fiction and therefore is not required to portray torture and interrogation realistically, but in February 2007, The New Yorker magazine reported that U.S. Army Brigadier General Patrick Finnegan (dean of the United States Military Academy at West Point), accompanied by three of the most experienced military and FBI interrogators in the country, met with the producers of 24 to criticize the show for misrepresenting the effectiveness of torture as an interrogation technique, saying it encouraged soldiers to see torture as a useful and justified tactic in the war on terror, and damaged the international image of the United States. Brigadier General Finnegan believed the show had an adverse effect on the training of American soldiers because it advocated unethical and illegal behavior. In his words:

"The kids see it, and say, 'If torture is wrong, what about "24"?' The disturbing thing is that although torture may cause Jack Bauer some angst, it is always the patriotic thing to do."

Joe Navarro, one of the FBI's top experts in questioning techniques, also attended the meeting. He told The New Yorker,

"Only a psychopath can torture and be unaffected. You don't want people like that in your organization. They are untrustworthy, and tend to have grotesque other problems."

The New Yorker article itself echoed many of these criticisms, and went on to suggest that the show's portrayal of torture was a reflection of the political views of its creator, Joel Surnow, an avowed conservative and supporter of George W. Bush. The New Yorker's criticism of 24 and Surnow was picked up by other commentators and bloggers. Andrew Sullivan, for instance, argued that 24 repeatedly used the "ticking time-bomb" scenario "in such a way as to normalize torture in the public consciousness."

"Gordon, who is a 'moderate Democrat,' said that it worries him when 'critics say that we've enabled and reflected the public's appetite for torture. Nobody wants to be the handmaid to a relaxed policy that accepts torture as a legitimate means of interrogation.' He went on, 'But the premise of 24 is the ticking time bomb. It takes an unusual situation and turns it into the meat and potatoes of the show.' He paused. 'I think people can differentiate between a television show and reality.'"

=== Conservative bias ===
On June 23, 2006, the politically conservative American think tank The Heritage Foundation held an unusual panel event to discuss "24 and America's Image in Fighting Terrorism". The panel event, which was first conceived by Supreme Court Justice Clarence Thomas's wife, Ginni, was moderated by talk radio host Rush Limbaugh. In addition to 24 executive producers Robert Cochran, Joel Surnow, and Howard Gordon, and 24 cast members Gregory Itzin, Mary Lynn Rajskub, and Carlos Bernard, the panel included Secretary of Homeland Security Michael Chertoff, and leading Homeland Security experts James Jay Carafano and David Heyman.

During the event, Limbaugh, a fan of the show himself, commented that "Everybody I've met in the government that I tell I watch this show, they are huge fans." He specifically identified former Vice President Dick Cheney, former Secretary of Defense Donald Rumsfeld and Republican political strategist Mary Matalin as enthusiastic fans. The event audience also included Justice Thomas and radio talk show host Laura Ingraham.

The show is popular among conservatives. Time magazine ran an article on January 14, 2007, analyzing the show's political tilt. The article argued that while the show's use of the "ticking time bomb scenario" favored conservative interpretations, the thriller is itself a conservative genre and that such scenarios "make for exciting TV". Furthermore, journalist James Poniewozik pointed out the show's use of plotlines—such as an invasion of a Middle East country based on fabricated evidence of WMD stockpiles and a "chilling" depiction of Muslims rounded up into detention centers—favored a more liberal view. Joel Surnow is also quoted as noting that the show has fans across the political spectrum, from Limbaugh to Barbra Streisand. TIME concludes that, "24's ideology—Jack Bauerism, if you will—is not so much in between left and right as it is outside them, impatient with both A.C.L.U. niceties and Bushian moral absolutes."

However, in February 2007, The New Yorker claimed that the series was heavily tilted towards conservatives. Throughout the article, "Whatever It Takes: The Politics Behind the Man of 24," Jane Mayer cites Surnow's support for the Republican Party and in particular his admiration of Ronald Reagan, whom Surnow states was "the father this country needed" and "made me feel good that I was in his family". Mayer also characterizes Rick Santorum, to whose campaign Surnow donated money, as "hard line" and Surnow's friend Cyrus Nowrasteh as a "hard-core conservative". Early in the article Mayer states that Surnow is a critic of the 2003 Iraq War, an "isolationist" and as someone who has "no faith in nation building".

=== Sexism ===
The show has been criticized for its misogyny and sexist portrayals of gender stereotypes. Female characters are generally portrayed as physically and emotionally weak, and often rehash archetypes such as "the innocent damsel in distress, the evil seductress and the mad woman"; at the same time the show also exaggerates male stereotypical behavior, which has been described as hypermasculine (almost always valuing direct action instead of reflection). The show has been described, therefore, as targeting primary male audience. Many fans have also criticized the female characters, with one researchers citing a fan comment about "the weakest, stupidest (…) female character in the history of television" about Kim Bauer, which has been "panned by the critics and the public", and also described as "television’s dumbest character".

== Audience interaction ==
The show was declared the sixth highest-rated show for the first ten years of IMDb.com Pro (2002–2012).

=== Fan phone ===
First appearing in the fifth episode of the fourth season, a valid California phone number (310-597-3781) has been shown on screen at various points during the show. The number, since dubbed the 24 "fan phone", leads to an actual telephone on the set, and received upwards of 50,000 callers in the first week after it was shown.

In the original scene containing the phone number, a character receives a call from her mother. In order to have the cellphone's caller ID show "Mom", producers chose to use a real phone (belonging to a member of the props department), rather than build a fake display. Although the number only appeared on screen for a moment, calls started flooding in within minutes of the first airing. The phone's owner canceled the account, but director Jon Cassar decided to reactivate the line. Since then, the number has appeared multiple times, as the phone number of various characters, through the fourth, fifth and sixth seasons.

Generally, especially of late, viewers calling the number are directed to a generic Nextel voicemail box; however, the phone is often picked up by whoever is free on set, and viewers have spoken to a wide variety of cast and crew members, including director Jon Cassar, production designer Joseph Hodges, Kim Raver (Audrey) and Carlos Bernard (Tony).
