= 24 season 4 =

24
- Season 4
- Promotional poster
- Starring: Kiefer Sutherland; Kim Raver; Alberta Watson; Lana Parrilla; Roger Cross; William Devane
- No. of episodes: 24

Release
- Original network: Fox
- Original release: January 9 – May 23, 2005

Season chronology
- ← Previous; Season 3 Next → Season 5

The fourth season of the American drama television series 24, also known as Day 4, premiered on January 9, 2005, on Fox and aired its season finale on May 23, 2005. The season four storyline starts and ends at 7:00 am.

== Season overview ==
The fourth season is set 18 months after season three. Jack is now working for Secretary of Defense James Heller after being fired by CTU due to his heroin addiction. As the day begins, he gets caught up in an elaborate terrorist plot which involves James Heller and his daughter Audrey Raines.

Unlike other seasons which focus on a singular threat, multiple enemies, and conspiracies, this season is based around one main enemy: a terrorist named Habib Marwan who controls a series of Middle Eastern terrorist cells that launch attacks against the United States. Rather than large acts, this season is divided into several smaller acts depending on which terrorist threat Marwan is focusing.

1. A train bombing is a diversion to kidnap the secretary of defense and his daughter.
2. A device from the train is used to initiate the forced meltdowns of nuclear power plants across America.
3. Terrorists steal a stealth fighter to shoot down Air Force One.
4. The terrorists steal the nuclear football, allowing them to launch a nuclear missile towards Los Angeles that must be intercepted.

=== Major subplots ===
- When Jack Bauer returns to field work, he clashes with other members of CTU over how operations should be run.
- Jack's relationship with Audrey is strained because she is horrified at the pain he is willing to inflict to acquire information.
- Audrey's brother Richard withholds information that could help CTU by claiming they have no right to invade his privacy.
- The Araz family is torn apart by conflicting opinions about the morality of inciting a nuclear catastrophe.
- Curtis suspects a co-worker, with whom he was previously involved, of being a mole.
- The crisis prevents Erin Driscoll, the new director of CTU, from being able to look after her daughter who has schizophrenia.
- Tony Almeida and Michelle Dessler, although divorced, find themselves working in the same office again.
- Charles Logan feels overwhelmed when he unexpectedly takes over the presidency during a crisis.
- David Palmer begins to discover corruption within the government.
- After the Chinese consul dies of friendly fire, CTU attempts to cover up the fact that Jack Bauer invaded the Chinese consulate.

=== Summary ===
Day 4 begins with the bombing of a commuter train which (unbeknownst to CTU at the time) enables the theft of a device known as the Dobsen-type Override which could be used to take control of (and melt down) United States nuclear power plants. With Jack Bauer working for Secretary of Defense James Heller, his job brings him to CTU as a visitor on this very day.

Believing that something terrible is about to happen, Jack begs CTU director Erin Driscoll to reinstate him and begins to interrogate a suspect. The suspect reveals that James Heller and Audrey Raines are the primary targets just as they are kidnapped. When Jack saves a civilian programmer who discovered evidence of a cyber-attack in progress (a friend of Chloe O'Brian), he allows one of the terrorists to escape and lead him to where Raines and Heller are being held. Even though Jack rescues them, the mass streaming of the planned execution video gives the terrorists the opportunity they need to launch an attack on the firewalls and begin using the override.

CTU finds out about the override with the help of Bauer and Tony Almeida and identifies the man responsible for using it: Habib Marwan, an employee of the defense contractor that developed the override. Marwan is able to sabotage one plant, the San Gabriel Island reactor, before Jack's team puts him on the run. Seeking extra intelligence, Bauer and Paul Raines (Audrey's ex-husband) travel to the headquarters of the defense contractor McLennan-Forrester. However, in an effort to cover up their complicity and erase computer records, McLennan-Forrester activates an EMP, causing a blackout over an 8-square-mile (21 km^{2}) section of downtown Los Angeles.

McLennan-Forrester sends mercenaries after Bauer and Raines. They critically injure Raines just as agents arrive sent by Tony Almeida and Michelle Dessler. The resulting turmoil allows a stealth fighter to be stolen from an Air Force base in Southern California. The pilot of the fighter shoots down Air Force One, which crashes into the Mojave Desert, almost killing President Keeler in the process. Vice President Charles Logan takes over for Keeler and seeks the help of David Palmer, when the role proves too much for him. Ultimately, Marwan's terror cells steal the nuclear football from the Air Force One crash site and they attempt to use it to commandeer a nuclear missile in Iowa.

Chloe nearly loses her life finding a lead about the missile. It leads Jack to a complicit Chinese national, Lee Jong, hiding at his nation's consulate in Los Angeles. When negotiations break down, Jack leads a clandestine raid against the Chinese consulate and kidnaps Jong. Poorly placed shots by Chinese guards kill the Chinese consul and injure Jong. Paul Raines dies in surgery when Jack insists that saving Lee Jong is a priority. This destroys his relationship with Audrey Raines. The nuclear missile is subsequently launched and CTU begins a last-ditch effort to discover its trajectory and intercept it. As Jack closes in on Marwan and the missile's location, Chinese agents find proof that Jack Bauer invaded their territory. To prevent American secrets from falling into Chinese hands, government officials propose that Jack be conveniently killed.

In a reversal of the events of Day 1, David Palmer warns Bauer of the attempt on his life, shortly after the nuclear missile is shot out of the sky. In response, Bauer fakes his own death with the help of Tony Almeida, Michelle Dessler and Chloe O'Brian. When Bauer is safely outside CTU, he says a final goodbye to his friend and president David Palmer. He then leaves his old life behind and disappears into the sunrise.

== Characters ==
When the season began, every character from the first three seasons was absent except for Jack Bauer, President Keeler (Palmer's Republican opponent in season 3), and Chloe O'Brian. However, as the season went on several characters returned, including Tony Almeida, Michelle Dessler, Mike Novick, David Palmer, Aaron Pierce, and Mandy, the assassin from seasons 1 and 2. To make room for these characters, other characters left. Erin Driscoll left after 12 episodes, Sarah Gavin—upgraded from recurring to the main cast in episode 7—was gone by episode 13 and Secretary of Defense James Heller left after episode 14 making one brief appearance afterwards. Also, Curtis Manning was upgraded from recurring to main cast in episode 14, making him the only other character along with Gavin to be upgraded to main cast mid-season in the history of the series. As a result, season 4 featured more cast changes than any previous season.

Two members of the season 4 main cast: Kiefer Sutherland and Kim Raver

=== Starring ===
- Kiefer Sutherland as Jack Bauer (24 episodes)
- Kim Raver as Audrey Raines (24 episodes)
- Alberta Watson as Erin Driscoll (12 episodes)
- Lana Parrilla as Sarah Gavin (12 episodes)
- Roger Cross as Curtis Manning (22 episodes)
- William Devane as Secretary of Defense James Heller (15 episodes)

=== Special guest stars ===
- Carlos Bernard as Tony Almeida (18 episodes)
- Reiko Aylesworth as Michelle Dessler (13 episodes)

=== Special guest appearance by ===
- Dennis Haysbert as David Palmer (6 episodes)

=== Guest starring ===
- Louis Lombardi as Edgar Stiles (24 episodes)
- Arnold Vosloo as Habib Marwan (17 episodes)
- Mary Lynn Rajskub as Chloe O'Brian (16 episodes)
- Geoff Pierson as President John Keeler (13 episodes)
- Shohreh Aghdashloo as Dina Araz (12 episodes)
- Jonathan Ahdout as Behrooz Araz (12 episodes)
- James Frain as Paul Raines (10 episodes)
- James Morrison as Bill Buchanan (10 episodes)
- Nestor Serrano as Navi Araz (10 episodes)
- Cameron Bancroft as Lee Castle (9 episodes)
- Gregory Itzin as Vice President/President Charles Logan (9 episodes)
- Jude Ciccolella as Mike Novick (8 episodes)
- Logan Marshall-Green as Richard Heller (7 episodes)
- Aisha Tyler as Marianne Taylor (7 episodes)
- John Allen Nelson as Walt Cummings (5 episodes)
- Leighton Meester as Debbie Pendleton (4 episodes)
- Lukas Haas as Andrew Paige (3 episodes)
- Mia Kirshner as Mandy (3 episodes)
- Tzi Ma as Cheng Zhi (2 episodes)
- Shawn Doyle as Ronnie Lobell (2 episodes)
- Glenn Morshower as Aaron Pierce (2 episodes)

== Episodes ==
No. overall	No. in season	Title	Directed by	Written by	Original release date	Prod. code	US viewers (millions)
73	1	"Day 4: 7:00 a.m. – 8:00 a.m."	Jon Cassar	Joel Surnow & Michael Loceff	January 9, 2005	4AFF01	15.31
18 months after the events of Day 3, Jack Bauer is now working for Secretary of Defense James Heller while secretly dating his daughter Audrey Raines. Bauer arrives at CTU Los Angeles on James' behalf to discuss a financial matter with Director Erin Driscoll, who had fired Jack due to his heroin addiction. CTU finds out about a terrorist attack, which is connected to an earlier attack when an important briefcase was robbed from its carrier in a crashed train, and the attack is intended to launch that day. CTU tracks terrorist associate Tomas Sherek, and Ronnie Lobell, the head of field ops, is instructed to arrest him. Using Bauer's help, Lobell manages to find Sherek hiding, and he is brought to CTU for questioning. Meanwhile, James visits his son, Richard, to convince him not to talk against the government at a lobby. Bauer enters the interrogation room by force and tortures Sherek, who reveals James as the target. CTU is too late to warn him, however, and James and Raines are abducted. Meanwhile, Andrew Paige, a hacker, finds suspicious activity on the Internet and informs agent Chloe O'Brian before he escapes the terrorists who target him for his finding, while Navi Araz, a Turkish patriarch, receives the briefcase.
74	2	"Day 4: 8:00 a.m. – 9:00 a.m."	Jon Cassar	Howard Gordon	January 9, 2005	4AFF02	14.34
Driscoll detains Bauer, but notices O'Brian's report of Paige and frees Bauer to find him, ordering Lobell to supervise him. Paige is tracked by Kalil Hasan, an operative, to a station, where Bauer and Lobell also arrive. As Hasan captures and abducts Paige, Bauer suggests following them instead of arresting Hasan, which Lobell refuses and moves to arrest Hasan, who fatally shoots him, while Bauer gives chase. Meanwhile, CTU believes Richard to be involved and starts questioning him, while James and Raines are brought to Omar, the leader, who starts a broadcast showing James and promising a trial. Navi instructs Behrooz, his teenage son, to deliver the briefcase to the compound where James and Raines are taken. On the way, Behrooz gets a call from Debbie Pendleton, his former girlfriend, with whom he ended his relationship at Navi's demand. Behrooz delivers the case before noticing Pendleton, who has followed him there, and when he returns home, Navi gets angry at him for revealing the location to her.
75	3	"Day 4: 9:00 a.m. – 10:00 a.m."	Brad Turner	Evan Katz	January 10, 2005	4AFF03	11.91
While chasing Hasan, Bauer calls and updates Driscoll, disobeying her order to arrest Hasan and continuing his chase, causing her to order the agents to find and arrest Bauer, while O'Brian starts helping him secretly. Hasan takes Paige to a secluded place and starts torturing him before he leaves and orders his men to kill him. Bauer kills the operatives before they can finish Paige and continues following Hasan, who stops at a road store. O'Brian tells Bauer that satellite support isn't ready yet, and he decides to make time by wearing a mask and beginning an armed robbery. Meanwhile, CTU uses truth serum on Richard initially, but agent Curtis Manning convinces Driscoll to use sensory disorientation instead. Omar forces James to sign a document of confession of committing war crimes by threatening to kill Raines, though James states that his signature will become a scandal for the government. Dina, Navi's wife and Behrooz's mother, states that they need to be sure Pendleton doesn't talk to anyone about the compound, and they invite her to the house.
76	4	"Day 4: 10:00 a.m. – 11:00 a.m."	Brad Turner	Stephen Kronish	January 10, 2005	4AFF04	13.35
As Bauer secures the hostages, a police officer arrives and Bauer is forced to capture him as well, forcing him to tell his superiors on the radio that everything is fine, but one of the hostages shouts and the police surround the store minutes later. Bauer takes Hasan as a human shield and exits the store, forcing the police to let them get in a car and drive away, while Bauer abandons Hasan on the road and leaves. Hasan hijacks a car and continues to his destination while being tracked by satellite, while Bauer is stopped by the police. Meanwhile, Marianne Taylor, a consultant who has a personal problem with Manning, arrives at CTU, trying to gain intel, but everyone ignores her, but she finds out that agent Edgar Stiles is helping O'Brian in her assistance of Bauer. Erin Driscoll finds out about O'Brian and arrests her, and Taylor threatens Stiles to reveal his involvement if he doesn't perform her demands. When Pendleton arrives at the Araz home, Dina fatally poisons her, stating that she could have been a risk. James and Raines make an unsuccessful attempt to break out, while Erin finds out that Maya, her daughter who has schizophrenia, is arrested for violence and has her transferred to CTU.
77	5	"Day 4: 11:00 a.m. – 12:00 p.m."	Jon Cassar	Peter M. Lenkov	January 17, 2005	4AFF05	11.51
Erin Driscoll orders the police to free Bauer, and CTU starts tracking Hasan, who finds out and informs Omar before committing suicide to avoid interrogation. With the potential destinations narrowed down, CTU finds the location using thermal imaging of satellite, and Bauer heads there for reconnaissance. President John Keeler is told that there isn't enough time for a rescue mission, and considering the broadcast and the execution will become a political scandal, he is convinced to order the compound be bombed, which would kill James and Raines. Erin informs Bauer of the President's decision and tells him not to go in, but he does. Meanwhile, Omar delivers the briefcase to an American associate before James and Raines are saved from suicide, while Raines recognizes the American. Dina makes it seem that Behrooz killed Debbie to protect him from Navi, just as Karen, Debbie's mother, arrives at the Araz's to find her before she is convinced that Debbie is not there. Erin offers O'Brian the option to resign in order to avoid prosecution, which she accepts.
78	6	"Day 4: 12:00 p.m. – 1:00 p.m."	Jon Cassar	Matt Michnovetz	January 24, 2005	4AFF06	12.20
Bauer infiltrates the compound, finding Audrey in her cell, then heads to save James, who is taken for the broadcast. As the operative tries to execute James, Bauer arrives and a shootout starts. They head outside and resist until the Marines arrive and neutralize the operatives, including Omar. Raines tells Bauer about the briefcase and the American man, recalling the place she'd previously seen the man. They return to CTU, where Erin decides to settle her differences with Bauer and allow him to continue working on the case, while James orders CTU to continue torturing Richard. Paul, Audrey's husband against whom she is filing a divorce, arrives to see her and finds out about the affair. CTU finds out that the briefcase belongs to McLennan-Forster, a government contractor, and contains an override device that can cause meltdowns at the nuclear reactors across the country, and Taylor reports CTU's discovery to an unknown person. Navi instructs Behrooz to help another associate bury Debbie's body outside the city, but when they arrive, Behrooz realizes that the associate intends to kill him on Navi's order, and thus, he kills the associate himself before fleeing from the scene.
79	7	"Day 4: 1:00 p.m. – 2:00 p.m."	Ken Girotti	Joel Surnow & Michael Loceff	January 31, 2005	4AFF07	11.52
CTU estimates millions of casualties as a result of the upcoming meltdowns, and Bauer and Audrey head to the security firm responsible for the building where she recalled seeing the American man to try to obtain information as to his identity. As they start checking the camera footage, they are attacked by operatives in a shootout, but they survive. Audrey suggests to call CTU for backup, but Bauer states that CTU cannot be trusted because there is a mole who had informed the terrorists of their mission. He calls someone he says he can trust and the duo heads outside, where Tony Almeida arrives and saves them, and the trio escapes. Stiles offers a way to stop the meltdowns, and after James allows it, Stiles manages to stop the meltdown of all the reactors except six, which James states can only be stopped by Bauer's lead. Meanwhile, Richard is freed as he seems not to know anything, while Dina gets angry with Navi for attempting to have Behrooz killed. Behrooz calls her and she arranges a secret meeting, but Navi finds out and forces her to help him capture Behrooz. She arrives at the location, informs Behrooz, and they escape, but she is shot in the arm by Navi, who then convinces Habib Marwan, the mastermind, to aid him in the capture of Dina and Behrooz.
80	8	"Day 4: 2:00 p.m. – 3:00 p.m."	Ken Girotti	Teleplay by : Stephen Kronish & Peter M. Lenkov; Story by : Matt Michnovetz	February 7, 2005	4AFF08	11.10
Bauer calls Heller and tells him to find the mole, and Heller instructs a specialist to do so. Jack, Tony and Audrey arrive at Almeida's, where they continue investigating the camera footage. Taylor is advised by Henry Powell, the man Audrey recalled, to divert attention to a false mole, and agent Sarah Gavin is picked. Sarah is sent to the interrogation room, where Erin orders the truth serum on Sarah. It is revealed that Bauer helped Almeida avoid incarceration for his actions, but that Almeida was angry and unable to find a job and pushed Michelle Dessler away from himself, and now he blames her for leaving him. Audrey identifies Powell before agents arrive and return her to CTU, and Bauer and Almeida head to Powell's location, where they manage to capture him, but Powell is killed by a sniper. Meanwhile, Stiles discovers and reveals that Taylor is the real mole; she escapes the building before being captured by Manning in the car park, where a car bomb explodes, intended for her, but killing an agent instead. Behrooz gets Dina to a hospital, where she is treated before the staff calls the police and the duo escapes.
81	9	"Day 4: 3:00 p.m. – 4:00 p.m."	Brad Turner	Howard Gordon & Evan Katz	February 14, 2005	4AFF09	11.42
As Taylor managed to enter CTU by having leverage over Erin and Manning in the first place, Erin delays her report to Division in order to make time for him to manipulate the report. Bauer finds Dina's number in Powell's cell phone and calls it, and CTU manages to track its location. Behrooz leaves for a hospital to ask his uncle, who works there, for help, while CTU forces storm in and capture Dina. Bauer convinces Keeler to sign immunity for Behrooz and offers it to Dina in exchange for her cooperation, which she accepts if Behrooz is secured first, and CTU sends forces to the hospital to locate Behrooz. Meanwhile, Navi arrives at the hospital and kills Behrooz's uncle, who had informed him of his son's location, and captures Behrooz, who warns him of CTU's pending arrival, forcing Navi to take Behrooz as a human shield and proceed to the basement. Meanwhile, Stiles notices his mother is in the exposure zone of a meltdown and makes calls to get her out, but she asks him to let her die. He tries to leave in order to save her himself, but Erin convinces him to stay and do his job, protecting thousands of people.
82	10	"Day 4: 4:00 p.m. – 5:00 p.m."	Brad Turner	Stephen Kronish & Peter M. Lenkov	February 21, 2005	4AFF10	13.16
Bauer infiltrates the basement, where Navi receives a call from Dina, who intends to distract him for Bauer. Behrooz fatally shoots Navi and is taken into CTU custody. Dina reveals a location vital to the planning of the nuclear meltdowns, and Bauer's team heads there and finds it to be a planning room, finding one of Paul's companies to be involved somehow. After Audrey is informed, she goes to his hotel room to keep him occupied, where Paul thinks she has come for romantic purposes before getting angry for her odd behavior, until Bauer and the team arrives and Paul is arrested. Almeida returns to CTU and Erin gives him provisional access to do his job. Meanwhile, Stiles states that his procedure can only delay the meltdowns, not stop them, and Gavin accepts to continue working if her arrest report is expunged. Taylor states that she will talk if she is granted immunity, but Manning states that she can only get to survive by cooperating. She agrees to help the investigation and heads with Manning to a company in the downtown Rockland building where they may be able to find a list of those involved, but Forbes, an operative affiliated with Marwan, arrives with his men, kills Taylor, and captures Manning.
83	11	"Day 4: 5:00 p.m. – 6:00 p.m."	Jon Cassar	Joel Surnow & Michael Loceff	February 28, 2005	4AFF11	14.55
As Forbes orders his men to torture Manning for information, Bauer does the same to Paul, making Audrey believe she was wrong about Bauer's personality. CTU manages to find the name of a major shareholder named Harris with Paul's help, and it is revealed that Marwan has been using that name as a fake identity, while CTU also discovers that Marwan/Harris has been renting space at the very company where Manning is currently being held. Almeida forces Dina to talk, and she reveals that Marwan is the mastermind and all the cells report to him. She confirms the building is Marwan's place of operation and where the override is, and Bauer and other agents head there. Manning manages to free himself and joins other agents after knocking Forbes unconscious. They kill an associate of Marwan and manage to find the override at Marwan's office, but he escapes by causing a panic after shooting a bullet, though Manning manages to stop the meltdowns with Stiles' help. Marwan kills an agent and wears his uniform in order to escape, but Bauer realizes what happened and warns the agents. Meanwhile, Maya causes disturbances at CTU and gets upset because of Erin ignoring her, and ultimately commits suicide, to Erin's horror.
84	12	"Day 4: 6:00 p.m. – 7:00 p.m."	Jon Cassar	Howard Gordon & Evan Katz	March 7, 2005	4AFF12	13.09
Paul offers Bauer help in investigating Marwan's office computer and heads there with Bauer. Heller suggests Erin drop her command of CTU because of her loss, but she decides to continue her job, though she continues to show emotional compromise, and after Almeida suggests assuming provisional command to Heller, Erin ultimately chooses to leave CTU for Almeida to take over. McLennan, the head of the company, is informed about Marwan, just as Bauer and Paul arrive at the company and are introduced to Dave Conlon, the head of security, and they start working on the computer. McLennan is convinced to order an EMP device to be exploded in order to fry the computer, since the information discovered can incriminate the company, too. Paul finds an encrypted file, and Bauer prints it before the system can turn off, then leaves in order to stop the bomb. Paul is captured by Conlon, who demands the paper, but the bomb explodes and the nearby buildings lose power. Michelle Dessler arrives from Division to assume command.
85	13	"Day 4: 7:00 p.m. – 8:00 p.m."	Rodney Charters	Anne Cofell Saunders	March 14, 2005	4AFF13	12.05
Almeida updates Dessler on Bauer's situation, while Conlon orders his men to torture Paul for the paper and leaves, though Bauer arrives, kills the mercenaries, and saves Paul. They escape to the streets, where it's almost dark as a result of the power loss, and Conlon assembles the company's skilled mercenaries, leading them to find the duo and eliminate them. The duo takes shelter in a gun store which is owned by two Middle Eastern brothers who decide to stay and help them. Bauer intentionally misses his shot at a mercenary, who informs the others; they arrive and a battle starts. Satellites detect the heat signature and Almeida deduces that it is Bauer's plan to inform CTU of his whereabouts, allowing CTU agents to arrive and neutralize the mercenaries. Conlon tries to shoot Bauer, but Paul interferes and takes the bullet before Conlon is killed. Meanwhile, Almeida and Dessler begin to settle their personal problem, while Dessler fires Gavin when the latter demands her arrest report be expunged immediately. Mitch Anderson, a former Air Force pilot, is revealed to be hired by Marwan to attack Keeler.
86	14	"Day 4: 8:00 p.m. – 9:00 p.m."	Tim Iacofano	Howard Gordon & Evan Katz	March 21, 2005	4AFF14	11.55
An injured Paul is taken to the medical subunit, while Dessler convinces O'Brian to return. CTU decrypts the writings of the paper and finds the name, Joseph Fayed, and Bauer offers Dina a new deal for her immunity in exchange for infiltrating Fayed's cell and helping CTU capture Marwan. She accepts and CTU makes a scenario where she has managed to capture Bauer, and they go to Fayed's house, where Fayed calls Marwan, who orders him to bring the duo to him. Meanwhile, John Hansen, an Air Force pilot, is told by Marwan's operatives that John's family has been taken hostage by their men and will be killed if John does not obey their instructions. Fayed delivers Dina and Jack to Marwan's men and separates before committing suicide to avoid capture. The duo is brought to Marwan, who tests Dina's loyalty by ordering her to shoot Bauer. She instead attempts to shoot Marwan, but the gun is revealed to be empty, and she is killed by Marwan's men. Hansen enters an Air Force base while secretly transferring Anderson, who kills Hansen and uses his fingerprint to enter the base.
87	15	"Day 4: 9:00 p.m. – 10:00 p.m."	Bryan Spicer	Joel Surnow & Michael Loceff	March 28, 2005	4AFF15	11.58
Anderson informs Marwan that there is a technical problem with the plane, which will be repaired in an hour, and Marwan tells Anderson to deal with it fast, while deducing that CTU will find out his plan in time to stop it and deciding to keep them occupied with another issue. Marwan offers CTU an exchange of Behrooz with Bauer, and CTU starts investigating the connection between Behrooz and Marwan, using truth serum on Behrooz. Bill Buchanan arrives from Division and assumes command, and O'Brian, who was just informed that her position has been swapped with Stiles' after her reinstatement, offers two trackers to be planted on Behrooz; one being easily found and dissuading the searchers from continuing, while Bauer secretly manipulates a phone line while in captivity. Buchanan approves the exchange and orders the trackers to be planted, but while the exchange is successful, Marwan's operatives find and destroy the trackers. Bauer tells CTU about the phone line, which can help in their efforts to find Marwan, while Anderson boards a stealth fighter and takes off.
88	16	"Day 4: 10:00 p.m. – 11:00 p.m."	Bryan Spicer	Teleplay by : Howard Gordon & Evan Katz; Story by : Robert Cochran	April 4, 2005	4AFF16	11.06
CTU manages to find Marwan's location before storming in, but Marwan escapes and a bomb explodes, destroying most of the data. CTU recovers the identity of Nicole, an associate of Marwan's, and an FBI agent is sent to question her, but she kills the agent and assumes her badge. Bauer arrives at the house and encounters her as an agent, and they start searching until Bauer realizes the truth and kills her, before finding out about the fighter and informing CTU, which deduces that Air Force One is the target. Keeler tells Vice President Charles Logan to be ready to assume the Oval Office if Keeler is attacked, but Logan shows anxiety. Bauer tries to dissuade Anderson from committing the attack, who is revealed to have been fired because of his addiction, but Anderson ultimately refuses to stop and shoots Air Force One down. Meanwhile, Paul regains consciousness, and Almeida notices the intimacy between Dessler and Buchanan; upon finding out that the pair have a long history, he confronts her and accuses her of infidelity during the time they were legally married, which she denies.
89	17	"Day 4: 11:00 p.m. – 12:00 a.m."	Jon Cassar	Duppy Demetrius	April 11, 2005	4AFF17	11.64
Air Force One crashes in the desert, and Keeler is critically wounded, while Anderson is revealed to have been shot down. Mike Novick, now working for Logan, informs Logan of the situation, prompting him to invoke the 25th Amendment. Audrey tells Bauer that CTU needs to recover the "football," a briefcase containing the codes to the U.S. nuclear arsenal, from the crash site. A couple on a camping trip in the desert comes upon the crash site, finds the briefcase, and calls the police. Bauer contacts them and instructs them to damage the transponder secreted in the briefcase so it cannot be tracked. Marwan and his men, who have already homed in on the transponder, arrive and start looking for the couple, who are found and captured in a reserve power station where Jack told them to hide. Marwan forces them to turn over the contents of the briefcase, and he absconds, though Bauer arrives, saves the couple from being killed, and retrieves the contents before realizing Marwan has taken a page showing the location and activation codes of the warheads. The Cabinet unanimously approves Logan's ascension, and he is sworn in as President, while Buchanan tells Almeida that Dessler still cares about him.
90	18	"Day 4: 12:00 a.m. – 1:00 a.m."	Jon Cassar	Joel Surnow & Michael Loceff	April 18, 2005	4AFF18	11.08
CTU is informed that a warhead has been stolen, while one of Marwan's operatives uses a forbidden credit card, traced by CTU, and Marwan orders him to meet an associate named Joseph Prado for help. CTU storms into their meeting place and finds the operative killed by Prado, who claims it to have been in self-defense, but is arrested anyway, while Marwan calls a human rights organization and informs them of the upcoming torture of Prado. As Prado is brought to CTU for truth serum, a lawyer arrives and demands to visit him in order to ensure the enforcement of Prado's legal rights, and Buchanan has no choice but to allow it. Bauer contacts Logan and requests permission to torture Prado; Novick supports it, but Walt Cummings, another assistant, opposes, and Logan ultimately denies the request. Bauer convinces Buchanan to fire him and release Prado, so that he can torture Prado while leaving CTU out of the crime. The plan works, and Bauer extracts Marwan's location from Prado.
91	19	"Day 4: 1:00 a.m. – 2:00 a.m."	Bryan Spicer	Howard Gordon & Evan Katz	April 25, 2005	4AFF19	11.03
Logan finds out about Bauer and orders Secret Service to arrest him. Bauer leads a team to Marwan's location, and they manage to identify Marwan who records a video of himself addressing the American people, promising upcoming attacks. Secret Service arrives and Marwan manages to escape, leaving the tape behind. Logan realizes that he is incapable of running the office and decides to resign, but Novick dissuades him and calls former President David Palmer for help, while Bauer is released on Logan's order. Marwan's operative, Sabir Ardakani, is questioned by his suspicious girlfriend, but his supervisor tells him he will handle the problem. The woman calls and informs CTU, and O'Brian is tasked to investigate it and heads to her house, where she starts analyzing the computer before an operative arrives and attacks them, but O'Brian manages to kill him by shooting him.
92	20	"Day 4: 2:00 a.m. – 3:00 a.m."	Bryan Spicer	Peter M. Lenkov	May 2, 2005	4AFF20	10.88
David Palmer arrives at the White House and is updated on the situation, and Logan gives him full authority to manage the crisis. CTU realizes from Marwan's video that the attack will happen at dawn, and O'Brian gets the identity of Lee Jong, an associate of Marwan's, where CTU learns that Lee is granted asylum in the Chinese consulate. The Chinese government agrees to extradite Lee, but through legal channels, which takes too long to stop the attack, so Palmer chooses to approve a clandestine operation to capture and extract Lee out of the consulate. Bauer infiltrates the consulate before abducting Lee and escaping, while masked agents storm in and help Bauer, causing a shootout in which the consul is killed while Lee gets critically shot. Another guard manages to lift the mask of Howard Bern, one of the CTU agents, who escapes with the others. Paul has another incident and goes under surgery, until Bauer brings Lee and orders the surgeon to leave Paul and save Lee. Paul dies as a result, and Audrey gets angry with Bauer.
93	21	"Day 4: 3:00 a.m. – 4:00 a.m."	Kevin Hooks	Joel Surnow & Michael Loceff	May 9, 2005	4AFF21	11.00
Chinese operative Cheng Zhi is tasked to investigate the assault on the consulate, where he gets Bern's face in the camera and tasks the intelligence system to identify him, finding out that Bern is a CTU agent and contacting Dessler, who refuses to cooperate, though the Secretary of State orders CTU to help Cheng's investigation. Logan gets angry with Palmer for the operation, but Novick convinces him to trust Palmer's decisions, while Palmer tries to make a scenario accusing an anti-Chinese terrorist organization for the assault. Cheng presents his findings to Buchanan, and suspects Bauer to be involved, but Bauer states that Bern is not the one in the picture, since he is on vacation. Cheng debriefs Audrey and Stiles, and becomes certain that Bauer led the attack. Meanwhile, CTU extracts a location from Lee, and Bauer leads the agents there, where Marwan is successfully captured. A video shows the warhead being launched, but CTU fails to find the location and the destination.
94	22	"Day 4: 4:00 a.m. – 5:00 a.m."	Kevin Hooks	Matt Michnovetz & Duppy Demetrius	May 16, 2005	4AFF22	11.67
Bauer tries to convince Marwan to talk, to no avail, and while being transferred, Marwan is rescued by his operatives. CTU finds Audrey's brother Richard's number in Marwan's cell phone, and Richard is arrested again, where James finally convinces him to talk. He reveals that he met a couple a few nights ago and invited them to his house, where he had sex with the man; that must have been the time the woman had called Marwan using Richard's phone. Bauer includes Almeida in his team to capture the couple, while Almeida and Dessler decide to leave CTU after the crisis is over in order to be together again. Bauer's team storms into the house, where they find the man killed by the woman, revealed to be Mandy. She is found by Almeida, whom she captures and then disappears. Meanwhile, the Speaker of the House tries to prove Logan's incapability to run the office in order to assume command, since the former is the next in line for the presidency, but Palmer encourages Logan to stand firm against the Speaker, who backs down.
95	23	"Day 4: 5:00 a.m. – 6:00 a.m."	Jon Cassar	Sam Montgomery	May 23, 2005	4AFF23	12.23
As Bauer formulates a plan to chase Mandy to capture Marwan, Mandy believes that Dessler will prefer Almeida to her job like he did the same for her, and contacts Dessler, threatening to kill him if Dessler does not help her escape from her apartment building, which is surrounded by CTU forces. Dessler opens the way for Mandy, but decides to reveal the truth of her actions to Buchanan. Before leaving the building, Mandy attacks her neighbors and takes them hostage. As CTU sees two people leave the building and get into a car, Mandy tells Dessler on the phone that she prefers to die in order to avoid capture, before the car explodes and kills the pair inside. As CTU agents begin to leave, Bauer realizes that the explosion was a deception, and Mandy and Almeida are revealed to be alive. Mandy attempts to leave with Almeida, but he manages to leave a trace of himself, allowing Bauer to find them and ultimately capture Mandy, before offering her immunity in exchange for her cooperation, which she accepts. Meanwhile, CTU attempts to transfer Bern to a safe house, but he is captured by Cheng's men. Cheng threatens to send Bern to China, where he will continue his life in misery, and as a result, Bern reveals Bauer's name.
96	24	"Day 4: 6:00 a.m. – 7:00 a.m."	Jon Cassar	Robert Cochran & Howard Gordon	May 23, 2005	4AFF24	12.23
Secret Service reveals that Mandy has been involved in many previous terrorist activities, one being the attempt on Palmer's life at the end of Day 2. Logan signs her grant of immunity anyway, and she reveals Marwan's location. Bauer leads his team to Marwan's location and a shootout starts, ending with Marwan killing himself by falling down a large height. CTU finds the specifics of the warhead and Los Angeles is revealed to be the target, and the Air Force manages to shoot down the warhead in the nick of time, putting an end to the terrorist crisis. After Bauer returns to CTU, Audrey breaks up with him stating she can't handle the violence despite loving Bauer, leaving him heartbroken. The Chinese contact Logan and play a video in which Bern confesses his and Bauer's involvement, before demanding Bauer be surrendered to them. Logan's assistant Cummings offers the murder of Bauer in order to prevent him from revealing the U.S. government's involvement, but Logan seemingly disapproves it. Ignoring Logan's disapproval, Cummings orders a Secret Service agent sent to take Bauer in custody to kill him in secret and frame it as an accident. Palmer finds out and informs Logan, who refuses to stop the scheme. Palmer calls and tells Bauer about the situation, who starts a shootout with the agent before appearing to have died. The agent leaves before Almeida and Dessler secretly revive Bauer, and O'Brian is tasked to fake Bauer's death. When Audrey learns of the incident, she thinks Bauer died trying to escape and is heartbroken by her loss. Bauer calls Palmer and thanks him for saving his life before saying goodbye. He walks off into the early morning sun to start a new life.

== Production ==
Season 4 was the first of three 24 seasons to be promoted with a prequel. The 10-minute prequel to the season was available with the third season DVD. It shows Jack being fired from his previous position at CTU and the beginnings of his relationship with Audrey Raines. It was broadcast on Sky One in the UK before the showing of the fourth season in that country. It was also available in the UK release of the fourth season DVD.

Additionally, "24: Conspiracy," 12 one-minute-long Mobisodes (mobile phone episodes), were created in 2005 as a promotion for Season Four. The episodes were originally seen by cell phone users in Europe and later in the United States as part of a Fox promotion for the show. The storyline continues to follow the Los Angeles branch of CTU.

=== Trailer ===
FOX's trailer for the fourth season of 24 begins with Jack telling Audrey that he is glad he no longer works for CTU. This discussion is interspersed with flashbacks to action sequences from previous seasons, implying that such experiences are a part of Jack that will never go away. The end of the trailer touches on differences between season 4 and previous seasons – e.g. "the enemy is more unpredictable". This echoes comments that Kiefer Sutherland made before the season 3 finale. He said "For three years, we've done the same scenario: A specific issue generates a 24-hour response. Next season will be dramatically different."

=== Continuous airing ===
The Fox Network decided to implement a year-round schedule because episodes of the show would be broadcast irregularly due to the fact that Fox had recently obtained the rights to air the World Series for several years. Thus, FOX chose to air all 24 episodes, without any hiatuses, over 19 weeks beginning mid-season—with back-to-back episodes airing twice in the first week, and again at the season finale. Utilizing the extra time this opportunity afforded the writers, season four's later premiere date allowed the creators to go back to previous episodes and fill in continuity errors and plot holes, making the episode transitions more fluid and realistic.

== Reception ==
The fourth season of 24 received positive reviews with a Metacritic score of 79 out of 100. On Rotten Tomatoes, the season has an approval rating of 95% with an average score of 8.3 out of 10 based on 21 reviews. The website's critical consensus reads, "The countdown remains breathlessly exhilarating even on the fourth try, with Kiefer Sutherland remaining a riveting star amidst an adrenaline-spiking crisis that finds new ways to up the stakes."

Kiefer Sutherland won the Screen Actors Guild Award for Outstanding Performance by a Male Actor in a Drama Series, two years after his previous win. 24 also won a Satellite Award in 2005 for Outstanding DVD Release of a Television Show. A trailer released for the fourth-season premiere summarized some of the critical praise for the season. The Houston Chronicle said "it grabs you and never lets go", The New York Times gave it four stars and Vogue said "the series that reinvented suspense has become an addiction".

=== Award nominations ===
Organization	Category	Nominee(s)	Result
Primetime Emmy Awards	Outstanding Drama Series	Jon Cassar, Robert Cochran, Howard Gordon, Brian Grazer, Tim Iacofano, Evan Katz, Stephen Kronish, Peter M. Lenkov, Michael Loceff, Joel Surnow, Kiefer Sutherland	Nominated
Primetime Emmy Awards	Outstanding Lead Actor in a Drama Series	Kiefer Sutherland	Nominated
Primetime Emmy Awards	Outstanding Single-Camera Picture Editing for a Series	David Latham	Nominated
Primetime Emmy Awards	Outstanding Single-Camera Picture Editing for a Series	Scott Powell	Nominated
Primetime Emmy Awards	Outstanding Single-Camera Picture Editing for a Series	Chris Willingham	Nominated
Primetime Emmy Awards	Outstanding Single-Camera Sound Mixing for a Series	William Gocke, Mike Olman, Ken Kobett	Won
Primetime Emmy Awards	Outstanding Sound Editing for a Series	William Dotson, Cathie Speakman, Pembrooke Andrews, Jeffrey Whitcher, Shawn Kennelly, Jeff Charbonneau, Laura Macias, Vince Nicastro	Won
Primetime Emmy Awards	Outstanding Music Composition for a Series, Dramatic Underscore	Sean Callery	Nominated
Primetime Emmy Awards	Outstanding Stunt Coordination	Matthew Taylor	Won
Primetime Emmy Awards	Outstanding Casting for a Drama Series	Debi Manwiller, Peggy Kennedy, Richard Pagano	Nominated
Primetime Emmy Awards	Outstanding Cinematography for a Single-Camera Series	Rodney Charters	Nominated
Golden Globe Awards	Best Drama Series		Nominated
Screen Actors Guild Awards	Outstanding Performance by a Male Actor in a Drama Series	Kiefer Sutherland	Won
Television Critics Association Awards	Outstanding Achievement in Drama		Nominated
Television Critics Association Awards	Individual Achievement in Drama	Kiefer Sutherland	Nominated

=== Depiction of torture ===
In the wake of the real-life Abu Ghraib scandal and similar allegations at other U.S. military facilities housing suspected terrorists, commentators accused the show of legitimizing the use of torture in the war on terror. Unlike other 24 seasons which featured them incidentally, torture scenes were crucial to the theme of Season 4 which examined the consequences of Jack Bauer's belief that the end justifies the means. Despite preventing a nuclear attack, there are several consequence to his actions: Dina Araz is killed in a risky sting operation, Paul Raines dies when Jack forces the only available surgeon to save a suspect, Jack loses the love of Audrey Raines and ultimately has to fake his own death and start a new life. In an interview with Charlie Rose, Kiefer Sutherland commented on the show's use of torture and how it relates to the recent controversies over government-sanctioned torture. "Do I personally believe that the police or any of these other legal agencies that are working for this government should be entitled to interrogate people and do the things that I do on the show? No, I do not."

== Home media releases ==
The fourth season was released on DVD in region 1 on December 6, 2005 and in region 2 on August 8, 2005.
