= 24 season 3 =

24
- Season 3
- Promotional poster
- Starring: Kiefer Sutherland; Elisha Cuthbert; Carlos Bernard; Reiko Aylesworth; James Badge Dale; Dennis Haysbert
- No. of episodes: 24

Release
- Original network: Fox
- Original release: October 28, 2003 – May 25, 2004

Season chronology
- ← Previous; Season 2 Next → Season 4

The third season of the American drama television series 24, also known as Day 3, premiered in the United States on Fox on October 28, 2003, and aired its season finale on May 25, 2004. The storyline starts and ends at 1:00 pm. The season premiere originally aired without commercial interruption, and has an extended running time of approximately 51 minutes, as opposed to the standard 43 minutes.

== Season overview ==
The third season is set 3 years after season two. It takes place primarily in Los Angeles but also in northern Mexico when Jack Bauer meets a family of drug dealers. Throughout the day, Jack Bauer and President David Palmer attempt to stop the release of a deadly virus by Stephen Saunders – a former government agent.

Like the previous two seasons, there are two main acts in the plot:

1. The first act deals with the response to an imminent biological threat which is expected to be carried out unless a highly valued prisoner is released, which reveals that the entire terrorist threat was a plot to access the real virus being auctioned in Mexico.
2. In the second act, Jack and the other CTU agents race against time to recover the virus from a radicalized agent who is using it to kill civilians and manipulate foreign policy.

=== Major subplots ===
- Jack Bauer fights against the heroin addiction that he incurred to maintain his cover.
- President Palmer faces scandal during his re-election campaign involving his girlfriend, whom he met through her job as his personal physician.
- Tony Almeida and Michelle Dessler struggle to prioritize national security over their love for each other.
- Jack disapproves of the relationship that is unfolding between Kim Bauer and Chase Edmunds.
- CTU staff members clash with Chloe O'Brian's personality.
- Palmer is forced to cover up a murder when his ex-wife Sherry Palmer greatly oversteps her bounds.
- Kim Bauer tries to prove herself fully competent even though Jack gave her the CTU job to keep an eye on her.
- Jack Bauer finally kills Nina Myers to get revenge for Teri's death.
- Stephen Saunders controls the actions of President Palmer under the threat of releasing the virus if his demands aren't met. One of the demands is the murder of Ryan Chappelle.
- CTU staff members, including Chase Edmunds and Adam Kaufman, deal with personal problems that cause some to question their fitness for the job.

=== Summary ===
Day 3 sees CTU deal with a deadly virus threat that would be released in Los Angeles. Jack's nemesis Nina Myers is also seen, while he is trying to break his heroin addiction after his undercover operation with Ramon and Hector Salazar. Jack's colleagues suspect that his difficulty quitting is related to the death of his wife Teri at the end of the first season. Jack has a new protege in tow, Chase Edmunds, but things take a turn for the worse when it is revealed Chase is seeing his daughter Kim, and it causes tension among the three of them.

President Palmer is seeking re-election against Senator John Keeler, but his campaign turns sour after one of his major backers, Alan Milliken, discovers that Palmer's brother, Wayne, has been sleeping with Julia Milliken, Alan's wife. Palmer's campaign suffers a major blow when revelations come out about his girlfriend and personal physician Anne Packard. The president turns to his ex-wife Sherry to deal with Milliken. Sherry takes it all a step too far when she kills Milliken by not allowing him his medication, which he needs to stay alive. Despite David Palmer's best cover-up efforts, Keeler uses it as leverage in the campaign. Toward the end of the day, Julia kills Sherry before taking her own life, and Palmer decides not to seek re-election.

Back at CTU, it turns out that Tony Almeida, Gael Ortega and Jack have been working undercover on a sting operation. Chase is initially unaware of the situation and attempts to "rescue" Jack, who is being held captive by the Salazars. Tony recovers from a gunshot wound to the neck, to return as head of CTU, with many doubting his abilities.

Nina comes in just as Jack and the Salazars are trying to get hold of the virus from Michael Amador, but he plays them all for fools. After Nina is captured by CTU and interrogated, she makes a daring escape attempt only to be found by Kim. Jack comes in and finally gets revenge for the death of his wife Teri.

Amador meets with his accomplice Marcus Alvers, who later plants some of the virus in a hotel ventilation system. When Michelle Dessler captures Alvers, he reveals that the mastermind of the day's events is a man from Jack's past named Stephen Saunders. Gael is killed soon after being exposed to the virus and Michelle has to deal with the threat at the hotel, as well as the unruly guests who soon discover the deadly truth. Saunders contacts President Palmer and gives him a series of assignments, one of which is the murder of Regional Division Director Ryan Chappelle. Jack and Chase try desperately to capture Saunders, but in the end, Jack is forced to kill Chappelle and hand over his body as proof.

Once Saunders is captured, Jack uses all means possible to stop the threat posed by the remaining vials. This ends with Jack cutting off Chase's hand in order to access the viral delivery devices. Physicians attempt to reattach his hand as the season draws to a close. The final scene of season 3 shows Jack Bauer having an emotional breakdown as a result of the day's events until he is once again enlisted by CTU to interrogate one of the day's suspects. The day ends with Jack on his way back to work.

== Characters ==
Season 3 main cast: (from left to right) Elisha Cuthbert, Dennis Haysbert, Kiefer Sutherland, Reiko Aylesworth, Carlos Bernard, and James Badge Dale

=== Starring ===
- Kiefer Sutherland as Jack Bauer (24 episodes)
- Elisha Cuthbert as Kim Bauer (24 episodes)
- Carlos Bernard as Tony Almeida (24 episodes)
- Reiko Aylesworth as Michelle Dessler (24 episodes)
- James Badge Dale as Chase Edmunds (24 episodes)
- Dennis Haysbert as President David Palmer (24 episodes)

=== Special guest star ===
- Penny Johnson Jerald as Sherry Palmer (10 episodes)

=== Guest starring ===
- Mary Lynn Rajskub as Chloe O'Brian (24 episodes)
- D. B. Woodside as Wayne Palmer (24 episodes)
- Zachary Quinto as Adam Kaufman (23 episodes)
- Jesse Borrego as Gael Ortega (14 episodes)
- Paul Schulze as Ryan Chappelle (14 episodes)
- Joaquim de Almeida as Ramon Salazar (12 episodes)
- Vincent Laresca as Hector Salazar (12 episodes)
- Vanessa Ferlito as Claudia Hernandez (11 episodes)
- Paul Blackthorne as Stephen Saunders (10 episodes)
- Greg Ellis as Michael Amador (9 episodes)
- Glenn Morshower as Aaron Pierce (9 episodes)
- Wendy Crewson as Dr. Anne Packard (8 episodes)
- Gina Torres as Julia Milliken (7 episodes)
- Christina Chang as Dr. Sunny Macer (6 episodes)
- Sarah Clarke as Nina Myers (6 episodes)
- Geoff Pierson as Senator John Keeler (6 episodes)
- Riley Smith as Kyle Singer (6 episodes)
- Alexandra Lydon as Jane Saunders (5 episodes)
- Andrea Thompson as Dr. Nicole Duncan (5 episodes)
- Doug Savant as Craig Phillips (4 episodes)
- Albert Hall as Alan Milliken (4 episodes)
- Daniel Dae Kim as Tom Baker (3 episodes)
- Wilmer Calderon as Pedro (2 episodes)
- Sarah Wynter as Kate Warner (1 episode)
- Alan Dale as Vice President Jim Prescott (1 episode)

== Episodes ==
| No. overall | No. in season | Title | Directed by | Written by | Original release date | Prod. code | US viewers (millions) |
|---|---|---|---|---|---|---|---|
| 49 | 1 | "Day 3: 1:00 p.m. – 2:00 p.m." | Jon Cassar | Joel Surnow & Michael Loceff | October 28, 2003 | 3AFF01 | 11.57 |
Three years after the events of Day 2, Jack Bauer and his daughter Kim are working at CTU, Tony Almeida and Michelle Dessler have married, and President David Palmer is competing with Senator John Keeler for the next term. Jack is revealed to have ended his relationship with Kate Warner because it interfered with his job, and is also revealed to be addicted to heroin, but is trying to quit. Kim is also revealed to be dating Chase Edmunds, a fellow field ops agent who is working closely with Jack, while David is dating Anne Packard, his doctor, which is not approved by Wayne, David's brother and Chief of Staff. As the day begins, a body is dropped off at a Los Angeles hospital, where it is diagnosed with Cordilla virus, which CTU is informed can cause a fast epidemic. Jack and Chase go to a prison to visit Ramon Salazar, a drug lord Jack had arrested after infiltrating a year ago, where the district attorney doesn't agree with Ramon's pardon because Ramon killed his family. An audio file is received from Hector, Ramon's brother in Mexico, demanding Ramon's freedom by threatening to release the virus in the U.S., while Kyle Singer, a young American man, is given a task by Hector's group.
| 50 | 2 | "Day 3: 2:00 p.m. – 3:00 p.m." | Jon Cassar | Joel Surnow & Michael Loceff | November 4, 2003 | 3AFF02 | 8.69 |
After Kim tells Jack about her relationship with Edmunds, CTU finds a lead, and Jack and Edmunds go to investigate it. On the way, Jack tells Edmunds that he brought Kim to CTU in order to protect her, and warns that Edmunds will threaten Kim with his career just as Jack's career had resulted in the death of his wife. The duo arrives at the location, where a shootout occurs, and they capture and torture a suspect, who reveals Singer's name. Jack then orders Edmunds to return to CTU with the apparent reason of his protection. Meanwhile, Singer notices that his mother can't pay the rent and pays it himself, making her wonder how he obtained the money. The D.A. has the guards beat up Ramon, while Gael Ortega, a CTU agent, appears to be spying for Hector. As Keeler arrives at the University of Southern California for a scheduled debate with David, Wayne shows David Keeler's playbook, which contains his points of speech at the upcoming debate. David refuses to look at it, but it attracts his attention when Wayne reveals that Keeler plans to bring Packard's former husband Ted, who knows something that can ruin David's reputation.
| 51 | 3 | "Day 3: 3:00 p.m. – 4:00 p.m." | Ian Toynton | Howard Gordon | November 11, 2003 | 3AFF03 | 8.84 |
Jack joins the Hazmat team and they head to Singer's house, where Singer's father questions him about his money and finds the drug pack he is keeping. Singer escapes and his parents try to get rid of the pack, but CTU agents storm in and quarantine the house to detect the virus, but no sign of infection is found, and Jack deduces that Singer must be carrying the virus himself. CTU tracks him, and Jack tells Almeida instead of Edmunds to recover Singer. Almeida intercepts Singer and tries to convince him to surrender, but one of Hector's mercenaries shoots Almeida in the neck and escapes while Singer also leaves the scene. Meanwhile, the D.A. visits Ramon on his request and a C.O. kills the D.A., revealing that his son was taken hostage. It is revealed that Ted worked for a pharmaceutical company and hired Anne to evaluate an experimental drug, and the research was apparently fabricated. Anne claims that she didn't know about it, but Ted is willing to testify that she did. Wayne offers to pay Ted to keep him silent and David approves it.
| 52 | 4 | "Day 3: 4:00 p.m. – 5:00 p.m." | Ian Toynton | Stephen Kronish | November 18, 2003 | 3AFF04 | 8.35 |
Almeida is taken to a hospital and Dessler assumes command of CTU. Jack tells David that they need to deliver Ramon to Hector in order to stop the attack, which David denies as the U.S. government never negotiates with terrorists. Jack offers to break out Ramon alone and thus the government can achieve both goals, and David implies his approval by saying nothing. Edmunds heads to the prison by himself to torture Ramon for information. Jack tells Kim to issue an executive order to deliver Ramon to him, which she does. Jack arrives at the prison, knocks Edmunds unconscious, locks him in Ramon's cell, and takes the latter with him. As the duo tries to leave, Edmunds is freed by the warden and orders Jack be stopped, but Jack opens the doors of the cells, allowing the inmates to get out and start a riot. Meanwhile, Singer joins his girlfriend and they are both captured by Hector's mercenaries. Wayne arranges his meeting with Ted and heads there, but after Anne convinces David to cancel the deal and disclose the truth, as she is innocent, Wayne returns without paying Ted.
| 53 | 5 | "Day 3: 5:00 p.m. – 6:00 p.m." | Jon Cassar | Evan Katz | November 25, 2003 | 3AFF05 | 9.75 |
While David and Keeler start the debate, Jack and Ramon attack two counter riot guards and wear their uniforms. They are taken hostage by the rioters along with a few other guards. The rioters perform a Russian roulette and pick Jack and another guard for the game. The guard dies and Ramon is brought to compete with Jack, but the guards storm in the room, giving Jack and Ramon the chance to escape. In captivity, Singer attempts suicide, but his girlfriend saves him. At the debate, Keeler states Anne's case and David counters it by stating it to be a minor matter compared to other national issues. CTU agent Chloe O'Brian finds injection gadgets in Jack's office and informs Dessler. Jack and Ramon reach the yard and Jack uses Ramon as a human shield, convincing Edmunds to let them leave as it is the only way to stop Hector's attack. As CTU agents find and arrest Singer and his girlfriend, Jack and Ramon get in a helicopter, just as Edmunds is informed Singer has been found, and he tries to inform Jack, who doesn't hear him and flies off in the helicopter with Ramon.
| 54 | 6 | "Day 3: 6:00 p.m. – 7:00 p.m." | Jon Cassar | Duppy Demetrius | December 2, 2003 | 3AFF06 | 10.51 |
Having arrived at CTU, Ryan Chappelle states that Army helicopters will shoot down Jack and Ramon if they don't surrender. Edmunds reminds Chappelle of the friendship between Jack and David, and advises him to inform David before he makes an attempt on Jack's life. While Keeler asks a challenging question from David at the debate, Wayne informs David about Jack, and David withdraws with the reason of national security, though Keeler claims that to be just an excuse. David orders the helicopters to shoot, but Jack has managed to reach on top of a populated region and the helicopters are ordered to hold in order to avoid civilian casualty, allowing Jack and Ramon to land and evade the agents. As the Hazmat team examines Singer for infection, Singer is revealed to be clean, surprising everyone. Jack and Ramon arrive at an airstrip, where Ramon tries to kill Jack, but Hector's men reveal that he is wanted alive, and Ramon has Jack knocked out as they get in the plane. Kim finds out about Ortega's communications with Hector before he confronts her.
| 55 | 7 | "Day 3: 7:00 p.m. – 8:00 p.m." | Ian Toynton | Robert Cochran & Howard Gordon | December 9, 2003 | 3AFF07 | 8.87 |
Ortega locks Kim in the mainframe, but Agent Kaufman finds and frees her, before security captures Ortega as he tries to escape, and after he refuses to talk, Chappelle brings a professional agent to inject Ortega with sodium amytal truth serum. In the plane, after the mercenaries stop Ramon from killing Jack, Jack frees himself and holds the others at gunpoint. Almeida regains consciousness and Dessler updates him, and he convinces her to sign his medical discharge papers so that he can return to CTU. After Edmunds finds a former associate of the Salazars and forces him to find Hector's residence in Mexico, he finds Jack's destination, calls Kim, and tells her that he needs to cut his connection in order to save Jack. As Almeida returns to CTU and stops Ortega's interrogation, Hector arrives with his men at the airstrip. The plane lands and Jack frees Ramon, before Jack is revealed to be working for Hector. Jack sends Ortega a signal by his watch, which Ortega interprets it as Jack's successful infiltration, and Almeida reveals to Chappelle that he and Gael have been assisting Jack in getting back undercover with the Salazars. Meanwhile, Anne gets a call from Ted, who claims to have documents proving her innocence, apparently having had a change of heart.
| 56 | 8 | "Day 3: 8:00 p.m. – 9:00 p.m." | Ian Toynton | Robert Cochran & Howard Gordon | December 16, 2003 | 3AFF08 | 8.97 |
Almeida plays a video recorded by Jack earlier. One month ago, Jack learned that the virus would be available in the black market soon, and decided to infiltrate the Salazar organization and have them buy the virus so that CTU could intercept and secure it, and because of the importance of the mission, only Almeida and Ortega knew about it. Hector tells Ramon about the deal, and Jack states he only wants to collect his share and disappear, though Hector reveals to Ramon that he intends to kill Jack after achieving the virus. Jack is revealed to be involved with Claudia Hernandez, Hector's girlfriend, whom Jack promised to free from Hector's captivity. As Jack calls Michael Amador, the seller, and arranges for the deal, Edmunds arrives in Mexico, where Salazar mercenaries attack and capture him, and Ramon tests Jack's loyalty by giving him an empty gun to shoot Edmunds. Jack passes it, and Edmunds attacks him and damages his watch and the transponder in it, and Ramon orders his men to torture Edmunds for information. Meanwhile, Ted gives the documents to Anne before committing suicide, and she ends her relationship with David.
| 57 | 9 | "Day 3: 9:00 p.m. – 10:00 p.m." | Brad Turner | Teleplay by : Evan Katz & Stephen Kronish; Story by : Robert Cochran & Howard Gordon | January 6, 2004 | 3AFF09 | 9.31 |
Hernandez tries to give Jack a phone so that he can call CTU to be traced, but fails, so he tells her to free Edmunds, who can save her and her family, and she goes to Edmunds and tells him her plan to break him out, before preparing her family. Jack and the brothers arrive at the location, where former CTU agent Nina Myers also arrives with plans to buy the virus for her own employer. She detects Jack and tries to persuade Amador that Jack is still working for the government, but fails. Dessler tells Chappelle that Almeida is unfit to lead CTU as a result of his injury, but Almeida proves his capability and consolidates his position, starting a friction between the couple. Amador holds an auction and Myers' party wins; the brothers decide to kill Jack, who convinces them to give him another chance to obtain the virus. Meanwhile, David gets a call from one of his sponsors, Alan Milliken, who invites him to his mansion without Wayne. There, Alan reveals that Wayne was previously involved with Julia, Alan's wife, and asks David to fire Wayne from his staff, but David refuses, and Wayne also fails in convincing David to accept it.
| 58 | 10 | "Day 3: 10:00 p.m. – 11:00 p.m." | Brad Turner | Joel Surnow & Michael Loceff | January 13, 2004 | 3AFF10 | 8.67 |
As the brothers and Jack return to the residence, O'Brian gets a call from a woman and recovers an infant from her and secretly brings it to her workplace. CTU locates Amador and informs Jack, and he and Ramon head to intercept Myers while Hector stays behind. Hernandez breaks out Edmunds and they enter a truck with her father and brother, but the mercenaries spot them leaving and shoot them, killing Hernandez. Jack and Ramon get to the warehouse Myers is staying, while Chappelle finds out about the infant and orders O'Brian to get it out soon. As Edmunds updates CTU, Jack infiltrates the warehouse alone and kills everyone except Myers and one mercenary before being captured. Jack apparently convinces Myers that he has left the government behind and is after money only, and she kills her mercenary and starts kissing Jack. Meanwhile, David realizes that Alan is ordering his puppet Senators to vote against his bill, and after promising Wayne that he will solve the problem, he calls his ex-wife Sherry for help.
| 59 | 11 | "Day 3: 11:00 p.m. – 12:00 a.m." | Jon Cassar | Joel Surnow & Michael Loceff | January 27, 2004 | 3AFF11 | 11.14 |
As Edmunds and the Mexicans join Delta forces, Jack manages to get himself free and capture Myers, and he updates Ramon. Hector finds Hernandez's body, before calling Ramon and telling him to cancel the deal, which Ramon refuses. As the virus is brought to Amador, O'Brian tasks Kim with watching after the baby until she finishes an errand, telling Kim that the baby is hers. They get Myers to cooperate, while Myers unsuccessfully tells Ramon about Jack's past and his untrustworthiness, and after Jack orders her to answer Amador's call, they arrange the location of the deal. Hector arrives at the warehouse and starts arguing with Ramon, while Jack secretly calls CTU and reports the location, and Almeida tasks the forces to move. Chappelle decides to suspend O'Brian for keeping the baby, but Dessler reminds him of O'Brian's skills and changes his mind. The Salazar team enters a nearby warehouse at the location, and Hector again tries to cancel the plan before being shot by Ramon. Meanwhile, David is visited by Sherry and tasks her with finding something in Alan's past to blackmail him with.
| 60 | 12 | "Day 3: 12:00 a.m. – 1:00 a.m." | Jon Cassar | Teleplay by : Robert Cochran & Howard Gordon; Story by : Evan Katz & Stephen Kronish | February 3, 2004 | 3AFF12 | 11.32 |
Hector succumbs to his gunshot wound, and Myers tells Ramon that she can prove Jack's plan. She shows him a nearby hill where she is sure Jack has tasked an agent for watching, and Ramon sends a team to check it, but Edmunds forces Ramon's mercenary to tell him on the radio that he hasn't found anything, leaving Ramon further unconvinced of Myers' words. After Kaufman tells Kim that the baby can't be O'Brian's, O'Brian makes up a story about the baby. Myers heads to the deal, where Amador arrives and gives the virus to her for testing. The test is successful, and he secretly replaces it with a fake one, which is actually a bomb. Just as the deal is done and Myers returns with the vial, they are attacked by the Delta forces, forcing Ramon and Myers to try and escape. In the ensuing battle, Ramon is intercepted and dies with the explosion of the vial, while Amador is stopped by Delta forces, who are neutralized by Amador's mercenaries hiding, and with no other lead, Jack orders the search for Myers. Meanwhile, Sherry meets a man who is willing to testify against Alan for murder if his son is pardoned, but he disappears, forcing Sherry to change tactics and arrange a meeting with Julia.
| 61 | 13 | "Day 3: 1:00 a.m. – 2:00 a.m." | Bryan Spicer | Teleplay by : Joel Surnow & Michael Loceff; Story by : Robert Cochran & Stephen Kronish | February 10, 2004 | 3AFF13 | 9.97 |
Jack manages to capture Myers, and they get on a plane, where she reveals the name Marcus Alvers, a man affiliated with Amador. She gives Jack a number to call, but when he does, it triggers a worm that begins freezing CTU servers and disclosing the identities of its Undercover agents in terrorist networks around the world, and she demands the return of the plane to Mexico and a safe jump outside for her in exchange for giving the kill code. Jack tells Almeida to use the help of O'Brian, who is being questioned by Chappelle about the baby, and she starts working on the worm. Almeida orders the plane to return, but Jack forces the pilot to continue. O'Brian manages to stop the worm, but Chappelle forces her to talk about the baby who is revealed to be Edmunds', shocking Kim. Meanwhile, Sherry visits Julia at the mansion before Alan interrupts them. The ensuing argument triggers his condition, needing his medication, but Sherry doesn't allow Julia to give it to him, and he quickly dies, while Sherry tells Julia to make up a story for the police and not reveal her presence.
| 62 | 14 | "Day 3: 2:00 a.m. – 3:00 a.m." | Bryan Spicer | Howard Gordon & Evan Katz | February 17, 2004 | 3AFF14 | 10.05 |
As Amador arrives at a bar and has a rendezvous with Alvers, Myers is brought to CTU, where Almeida starts questioning her, while Chappelle and another agent from Division debrief Jack about his addiction, which he explains went through for his cover in the Salazar organization. Edmunds explains to Kim that the baby was conceived before he started dating her, and he didn't know about it for a long time, and states that he still loves her. Almeida orders truth serum on Myers, but while it's being injected, she critically wounds herself and is transferred to medical care, where she manages to escape confinement. Kim finds her in a room, where Myers pulls a gun on Kim before being stopped and ultimately fatally shot by Jack, finally avenging the death of his wife. Meanwhile, Sherry returns and tells David that she didn't go to the mansion as he suggested, but he later finds out about Alan and confronts her, who states that she had an argument with Alan, but doesn't say anything about the medication, and says that it must be covered because the press will ruin David's campaign if revealed. Later, Wayne calls Julia, who reveals the truth to him.
| 63 | 15 | "Day 3: 3:00 a.m. – 4:00 a.m." | Kevin Hooks | Teleplay by : Robert Cochran & Howard Gordon; Story by : Michael Loceff | February 24, 2004 | 3AFF15 | 10.50 |
Chappelle lectures Jack for killing Myers, believing it to be for revenge instead of self-defense. Stephen Saunders, the original buyer, arrives at the bar and obtains the virus, and is revealed to have picked a medium-populated target for sending a message. CTU gets the location of the bar, and Jack and Edmunds head there, capture Amador, and start interrogating him, deducing a hotel to be a target. Dessler and Ortega lead a team to secure the hotel, and when they arrive, Dessler captures Alvers, who reveals where he has planted the virus. Ortega finds it before it detonates and infects him while spreading into the ventilation system. Meanwhile, Wayne keeps the truth hidden from David before confronting Sherry, while a detective questions Julia and finds discrepancies in her statements, and she finally tells the truth, but when the detective calls Sherry, she denies Julia's statements and says that she hadn't met her that night.
| 64 | 16 | "Day 3: 4:00 a.m. – 5:00 a.m." | Kevin Hooks | Evan Katz & Stephen Kronish | March 30, 2004 | 3AFF16 | 11.50 |
CTU shuts down the ventilation system to minimize the effect, and Alvers and Dessler make a deal for her to kill him if he starts showing symptoms; in exchange, he reveals that he has added a chemical compound to the virus accelerating its effect. As Ortega starts having a nosebleed and showing other symptoms, one of the staff tries to break out of quarantine, but Dessler convinces him to stay, but another one of the guests also tries to break out before he is fatally shot by Dessler. Meanwhile, Jack leaves the room Amador is held in, giving Amador the chance to escape, but this is revealed to be CTU's plan in order to follow Amador, who meets Saunders' operative in a car, which explodes and kills them. Jack gets a call from Saunders, who has delivered the vials to his operatives, and after he connects him to David, Saunders threatens to release the virus in more populated regions if his demands aren't fulfilled. In the meantime, David lies to the police by confirming Sherry's alibi before expressing her his displeasure and demanding her to leave.
| 65 | 17 | "Day 3: 5:00 a.m. – 6:00 a.m." | Ian Toynton | Robert Cochran & Stephen Kronish | April 6, 2004 | 3AFF17 | 10.77 |
Dessler asks Alvers about Saunders' name, which he doesn't know, and Jack instructs CTU to show Alvers the pictures of Jack's previous associates who are presumed dead. Saunders is identified and it is revealed that he was one of the members of Jack's team during the mission to attack Victor Drazen, and Saunders was believed to have died along with other members. After CTU enlists the help of MI6 and identifies Saunders' former girlfriend, Diana White, Jack and Edmunds detain her and head to the MI6 substation for more intel. Saunders sends an untraceable phone to David for communication and demands him to give a hidden message in a press conference, which he does. MI6 is attacked by Saunders' mercenaries, and in the ensuing chaos, White is killed and a bomb destroys almost all of the data after Jack recovers a drive. Saunders discovers that Chappelle is investigating one of Saunders' bank accounts and is very skilled at it, then calls David and demands Chappelle be killed and his body delivered in an hour. Meanwhile, Ortega dies as a result of the infection.
| 66 | 18 | "Day 3: 6:00 a.m. – 7:00 a.m." | Ian Toynton | Howard Gordon & Evan Katz | April 18, 2004 | 3AFF18 | 6.47 |
After Jack informs Chappelle of Saunders' demand, CTU identifies a possible location of Saunders, and Edmunds leads a team there while Jack and Chappelle head to the place Saunders designated for Chappelle to be at. Edmunds' team storms in, but finds out that Saunders has only forwarded his connection through there. Meanwhile, Dessler convinces Almeida to send suicide capsules to the hotel and offers them to the infected people as a painless death, which some accept. An infected woman reveals that she had a one-night stand with a man that night, and CTU fails to find him at the hotel, deducing that he has left and can cause an epidemic. She states that she doesn't know his name and identifies him by his picture, while he arrives home, revealed to be married, and notices his nose bleed. With no other option except to follow Saunders' demand, Jack gives Chappelle a chance to talk to anyone he wishes on the phone before his death, but Chappelle states that there is no one. He convinces Jack to let him do it himself, but hesitates and Jack kills him after begging for absolution.
| 67 | 19 | "Day 3: 7:00 a.m. – 8:00 a.m." | Jon Cassar | Michael Loceff | April 20, 2004 | 3AFF19 | 10.54 |
As Stephen Saunders' mercenaries claim Chappelle's body, David tells CTU that he will not obey Stephen anymore and they must find him soon. CTU identifies Stephen's daughter, Jane, who is studying at a university, and Kim is picked as the best physical match for use as a double for Jane, but while Jack and Edmunds disagree, Kim decides on her own accord to do it. Jack leads her team while Edmunds is instructed to command a group to find the infected man outside. As Stephen demands David send him the list of the undercover agents working for the U.S. government, Jack's team arrives at the university, abducts Jane secretly, and Kim wears her clothes and goes to her workplace. Jack starts questioning Jane before Kim is spotted by Stephen's operative, who is killed by Kim in the ensuing struggle. Meanwhile, Edmunds' team storms in the man's house and finds him gone, and they start questioning his wife while he goes to a drugstore for his nosebleed and then a hospital, where he is spotted and quarantined. Edmunds questions him for his possible contacts with other civilians, and CTU begins to assess the epidemic.
| 68 | 20 | "Day 3: 8:00 a.m. – 9:00 a.m." | Jon Cassar | Virgil Williams | April 27, 2004 | 3AFF20 | 11.13 |
Jack returns to Jane and proves Stephen Saunders' actions, scaring her, and after she reveals that Stephen gave her a special phone number for emergencies, she calls that number and Stephen answers, being traced by CTU. Meanwhile, Dessler's test is revealed to be negative and she leaves the hotel in relief. David states that if Stephen doesn't cooperate, they'll need to force him using his daughter Jane, as there is no other choice. Kim is instructed to transfer Jane to CTU, while Stephen doesn't leave his place although he knows CTU is coming. Kaufman learns from O'Brian that his sister has become infected, and David gathers the reporters and encourages them to tell the people to stay home. Jack, Edmunds and other agents arrive at Saunders' location and surround the building, but Stephen calls Almeida and shows him a live video of Dessler being held at gunpoint, before demanding Almeida give him a safe passage out of the building. Almeida orders the agents watching one of the exits to move to another, allowing Stephen to leave through the exit without being noticed.
| 69 | 21 | "Day 3: 9:00 a.m. – 10:00 a.m." | Frederick King Keller | Joel Surnow & Michael Loceff | May 4, 2004 | 3AFF21 | 11.09 |
Stephen calls Almeida and offers the exchange of Dessler for Jane, who is brought to CTU. Jack's team enters the building and finds it empty, while Almeida tells them that it was a technical mistake, but Jack starts investigating the truth about Almeida's actions, while Kaufman and O'Brian believe that Stephen has a mole in CTU. Jane talks to Stephen on the phone while Almeida and Dessler talk, and Jack ultimately discovers that Almeida tried to cover up his mistake and thus takes over the command of CTU. O'Brian enters the mainframe and finds the conversations between Almeida and Stephen, discovering the situation with Dessler. Almeida cuts Chloe's connection and locks her in the room, before breaking out Jane and escaping, but Jack rescues O'Brian and finds out about Dessler. Meanwhile, Keeler begins to lose popularity after he humiliated David for leaving the debate with a national security excuse, and the threat turning out to be real. Sherry arrives at Keeler's office and reveals her adventures and David's complicity to him, advising Keeler to blackmail David to withdraw from his campaign, and Keeler arranges to visit David.
| 70 | 22 | "Day 3: 10:00 a.m. – 11:00 a.m." | Frederick King Keller | Teleplay by : Evan Katz & Stephen Kronish; Story by : Robert Cochran & Howard Gordon | May 11, 2004 | 3AFF22 | 12.19 |
Jack intercepts Almeida's car and promises him that he will save Dessler, and Almeida gets another call from Stephen, who informs the location of the exchange, but Jack advises Almeida not to surrender to Stephen's wishes and hangs up. Stephen calls again and arranges a second location, which Jack believes can be secured by CTU more easily. Dessler manages to escape confinement and calls CTU, but Jack persuades her to return and surrender so that CTU can capture Stephen at the exchange as planned. Almeida and Jane arrive while agents are watching, and Dessler and Jane are released simultaneously, but Jane decides to return to Almeida, causing Stephen to exit his car to return Dessler and exposing himself to CTU in the process. A shootout ensues, and Stephen tries to enter his helicopter for extraction, before it is destroyed by Marine FA-18s and he is arrested. Meanwhile, Edmunds decides to leave field ops after the mission in order to be with Kim and his daughter. Keeler visits David and makes his demand, and Wayne convinces David to let him hire a professional burglar to recover the evidence from Sherry's house.
| 71 | 23 | "Day 3: 11:00 a.m. – 12:00 p.m." | Jon Cassar | Teleplay by : Robert Cochran & Howard Gordon; Story by : Evan Katz & Stephen Kronish | May 18, 2004 | 3AFF23 | 10.97 |
Almeida is arrested by Division agents, where he is informed that he can face the death penalty for committing an act of treason by breaking out Jane. A captured Stephen states that every vial has an attached GPS device that has a code for locating, and he has memorized all codes in order to keep them safe. Jack tells Jane to convince Stephen to cooperate, but when she is unsuccessful in doing so, Jack then orders the agents to take her inside the hotel and infect her, and this forces Stephen to change his mind. He ultimately reveals all the codes and all but one of the vials are secured by federal and local law enforcement forces across the country, while the remaining vial is in Los Angeles and is tracked to a subway station. Jack, Edmunds and other agents arrive and find out that the operative has removed the GPS device, and lock down the station. Meanwhile, David arranges a meeting with Sherry in order to pull her out, allowing Wayne and his recruit to enter the house, but fail to find the evidence before Sherry returns, but they knock her down and find it on her. As they leave, Wayne notices Julia entering the house to confront Sherry for allowing her husband to die. Despite Sherry pleading for her life and again trying to manipulate her, Julia ultimately refuses to listen and kills Sherry before committing suicide.
| 72 | 24 | "Day 3: 12:00 p.m. – 1:00 p.m." | Jon Cassar | Joel Surnow & Michael Loceff | May 25, 2004 | 3AFF24 | 12.31 |
Stephen is brought to CTU and states that the operative's name is Arthur Rabens, and he is instructed to detect Rabens by images captured from every individual at the station, while Edmunds tells Jack about his plan after the mission. Ortega's wife arrives to claim his belongings, but finds out that Stephen is the mastermind and fatally shoots him, though Jack manages to notice Rabens regardless of the setback and starts following him with Edmunds. They arrive at a school full of children, where Edmunds finds Rabens and engages him before being overpowered. Edmunds locks his hand to the vial, and Jack arrives and kills Rabens. Jack is guided by a professional agent for defusing the device, but is unsuccessful, and Edmunds convinces Jack to cut the former's hand and secure the vial, which Jack does. Meanwhile, Wayne returns and explains to David about the deaths of Sherry and Julia, and Wayne offers to make a scenario to cover up the truth, but David decides to withdraw from the campaign and tells Jack his decision. In the aftermath, Almeida is transferred out of CTU to be processed, doctors take Edmunds in for surgery with Kim at his side, while Jack begins to break down emotionally as a result of the day's events, but ultimately calms down and heads back to work as he is enlisted by CTU to interrogate another suspect.

== Production ==
The third to last episode showed F18 fighters destroying a helicopter from the air. This scene was filmed on location and required extensive collaboration between the film crew, the United States Marine Corps and the Federal Aviation Administration. Efforts were made to show the response to a virus outbreak realistically. Anne Cofell, a researcher for 24, consulted with a virologist and the Centers for Disease Control. The writers originally planned to incorporate a real virus into the plot but ended up using a fictitious one when researchers doubted that any real virus would be that deadly.

=== Trailer ===
The initial trailer promoting season 3 was much longer than the trailer promoting season 2. It touches on many of the early plot points including the threat to release the virus, Jack's heroin addiction and the relationship between Kim Bauer and Chase Edmunds.

== Reception ==
The third season of 24 received "generally favorable" reviews, scoring a Metacritic rating of 72/100 based on 14 reviews. On Rotten Tomatoes, the season has an approval rating of 93% with an average score of 7.2 out of 10 based on 15 reviews. The website's critical consensus reads, "24's third day marks the series' most ruthless season yet with a breathless race to avert chemical catastrophe, a myriad of shocking surprises, and an unnerving disregard for treating any character as safe."

Empire ranked "Day 3: 6:00 a.m. – 7:00 a.m." as the best ever 24 episode saying "As Jack puts a bullet into Ryan's head and weeps, the clock at the end of the episode remains silent, capping off the most emotional and darkest hour in 24's history."

=== Award nominations ===
24 won four Emmy awards for its third season and also, the Golden Globe Award for Best Television Series – Drama, after being nominated 3 times in a row.

| Organization | Category | Nominee(s) | Result |
|---|---|---|---|
| Primetime Emmy Awards | Outstanding Drama Series | Jon Cassar, Robert Cochran, Howard Gordon, Brian Grazer, Tim Iacofano, Evan Katz, Stephen Kronish, Michael Loceff, Tony Krantz, Joel Surnow, Kiefer Sutherland | Nominated |
| Primetime Emmy Awards | Outstanding Lead Actor in a Drama Series | Kiefer Sutherland | Nominated |
| Primetime Emmy Awards | Outstanding Single-Camera Picture Editing for a Series | Chris Willingham, David Latham | Won |
| Primetime Emmy Awards | Outstanding Single-Camera Sound Mixing for a Series | William Gocke, Mike Olman, Ken Kobett | Won |
| Primetime Emmy Awards | Outstanding Sound Editing for a Series | William Dotson, Cathie Speakman, Pembrooke Andrews, Jeffrey Whitcher, Paul Menichini, Todd Morrissey, Shawn Kennelly, Jeff Charbonneau, Laura Macias, Vince Nicastro | Nominated |
| Primetime Emmy Awards | Outstanding Music Composition for a Series, Dramatic Underscore | Sean Callery | Nominated |
| Primetime Emmy Awards | Outstanding Casting for a Drama Series | Debi Manwiller, Peggy Kennedy, Richard Pagano | Won |
| Primetime Emmy Awards | Outstanding Stunt Coordination | Gregory J. Barnett | Won |
| Golden Globe Awards | Best Drama Series | | Won |
| Golden Globe Awards | Best Actor in a Drama Series | Kiefer Sutherland | Nominated |
| Screen Actors Guild Awards | Outstanding Performance by a Male Actor in a Drama Series | Kiefer Sutherland | Nominated |
| Screen Actors Guild Awards | Outstanding Performance by an Ensemble in a Drama Series | Reiko Aylesworth, Carlos Bernard, Elisha Cuthbert, James Badge Dale, Joaquim de Almeida, Dennis Haysbert, Mary Lynn Rajskub, Paul Schulze, Kiefer Sutherland | Nominated |
| Directors Guild of America Awards | Best Directing for a Drama Series | Jon Cassar | Nominated |
| Television Critics Association Awards | Outstanding Achievement in Drama | | Nominated |
| Television Critics Association Awards | Individual Achievement in Drama | Kiefer Sutherland | Nominated |

== Home media releases ==
The third season was released on DVD in region 1 on December 7, 2004 and in region 2 on August 9, 2004.
