= Reiko Aylesworth =

American actress (born 1972)

- Born: Reiko M. Aylesworth; December 9, 1972 (age 53); Evanston, Illinois, U.S.
- Education: University of Washington
- Occupation: Actress
- Years active: 1988–present
- Spouse: Rob Clare

Reiko M. Aylesworth (born December 9, 1972) is an American actress. She is known for playing Michelle Dessler in the action television series 24.

== Early life, career start ==
Aylesworth was born December 9, 1972, in Evanston, Illinois, and is of Dutch, Welsh, and Japanese ancestry. Her given name, Reiko (礼子), is Japanese; her surname, Aylesworth, is English. She lived in Springfield, Illinois, from 1987 to 1988, where she first became interested in acting. After understudying in several productions at the Springfield Theatre Centre, Aylesworth was cast in the role of Consuelo in West Side Story, while her family was preparing to move to Seattle, Washington. When her family left for Seattle, she remained in Springfield with family friends of theirs for the duration of the play's run.

After joining her family in Seattle, Aylesworth attended the University of Washington and studied neuroscience. While there, she participated in several local theater productions including Invisible Friends at the Seattle Children's Theatre and the Intiman Theatre Company's production of Peter Pan where she played Wendy.

Aylesworth's performance in Peter Pan brought her to the attention of talent scouts at ABC, leading to the beginning of her television and film career as Rebecca Lewis on the soap opera One Life to Live. After her character was written out of One Life to Live, she appeared in the independent film Childhood's End and the final episode of the HBO series Lifestories: Families in Crisis. During this time Aylesworth also appeared in at least three Off Broadway productions.

Following a guest appearance on Law & Order and a supporting role in the miniseries A Will of Their Own, Aylesworth had minor appearances in the movies Random Hearts and You've Got Mail followed by a guest star role in the CBS series Now and Again. Soon after NBC cast Aylesworth as Becca Coltrane in the pilot for the series Sherman's March, however, it was not picked up and aired as a standalone television movie.

Aylesworth continued her work on television with guest appearances in The West Wing, Law & Order: Special Victims Unit, and Ed as well as being cast in a lead role in the supernatural hospital drama All Souls. When All Souls was cancelled after its sixth episode, Aylesworth joined the cast of the new series The American Embassy, which was quickly cancelled after its fourth episode.

== Career ==
=== 24 ===
Following the cancellation of The American Embassy, Aylesworth auditioned for the part of Nina Myers on Fox Network's 24 but the role went to Sarah Clarke. When casting began for 24's second season, Aylesworth again auditioned, this time for the part of Kate Warner, but the role went to Sarah Wynter. However, the producers were impressed with her and asked her to join the cast for a ten episode recurring role as Michelle Dessler, a CTU agent. Despite being credited as a guest star for the entire season, she appeared in all 24 episodes.

Director Jon Cassar quickly noticed the "chemistry" between Aylesworth and her costar Carlos Bernard, in the role of Tony Almeida. which led to a decision to develop the characters' onscreen relationship. The relationship between Michelle and Tony quickly became popular with fans and later would resurface as one of the driving forces in the show's seventh season.

While on hiatus from 24 after season two, Aylesworth filmed an episode for the second season of The Dead Zone, playing a love interest for Anthony Michael Hall's Johnny Smith. By 24's third season (2003–2004), Aylesworth had become a main cast member with Tony and Michelle now married and holding leadership positions at CTU. However, when the season concluded, the writers announced that most of the characters were being dropped, with those actors not being retained for season 4. Upon being released from 24, Aylesworth was cast as Chandra Moore, a DNA analyst, in the fifth season of CSI: Crime Scene Investigation; while the role was intended to be recurring, it was dropped after one episode.

As season 4 of 24 progressed, some of the characters from previous seasons returned mid-season, including Aylesworth as Michelle Dessler. The character returns in the twelfth episode, now a high level bureaucrat within the CTU hierarchy, serving as CTU Director for the remainder of the season. Her character resigns at the end in order to remarry Tony Almeida, then is killed by a car bomb in the opening episode of season 5.

=== Initial post-24 roles ===
Following her departure from 24, Aylesworth landed her first leading role in a feature film – the independent, romantic drama Crazylove where she worked alongside Bruno Campos and former 24 costar Paul Schulze. Crazylove tells the story of Letty Mayer, a school teacher who suffers a nervous breakdown and while institutionalized, meets Michael (Campos) and the two begin a dangerous and unpredictable romance. She partnered with her former 24 costar Xander Berkeley in the Sci Fi Channel made-for-television movie, Magma: Volcanic Disaster. In a guest start role on the short-lived series Conviction, she played a renowned attorney who killed her husband and then defended herself at the murder trial. When the cast was selected for the series 3 lbs, Aylesworth was chosen for the role of Dr. Adrienne Holland, but the pilot was rejected by CBS. The following season, CBS decided to buy the series for a late fall 2006 premiere, but the lead roles were recast, including Aylesworth's. It is unknown whether she declined the 3 lbs role or she was not offered it again.

Soon after the conclusion of 24's fifth season, Aylesworth and her 24 costar D. B. Woodside filmed the short, First which was also written, produced, and directed by Woodside. Aylesworth's character, Angelina Marveau, was "a fallen French nun" who was fighting to choose between her religious beliefs and first love, a nihilistic, American professor, who was portrayed by Woodside.

=== 2006–2008 ===
In 2006, Aylesworth filmed roles for two feature movie along with an independent production. In the Kevin Costner movie Mr. Brooks, Aylesworth portrayed a divorce lawyer, Sheila, who was representing the husband of Demi Moore's character, Detective Tracy Atwood. Departing from her previous type of characters, Aylesworth played the femme fatale Audrey Levine in the Gideon Raff independent thriller The Killing Floor.

Aylesworth played one of the two lead roles in Aliens vs. Predator: Requiem (2007). Her character, Kelly O'Brien, an Army pilot and soldier returning home after being deployed overseas, arrives in Gunnison, Colorado the day before the Aliens and Predator invade the town.

In January 2007, Aylesworth had a guest role in two episodes of the ABC comedy, The Knights of Prosperity, where she played the head of Mick Jagger's security company, Simone Cashwell. The Knights attempt to seduce her character in order to obtain the necessary security codes to access Jagger's apartment and later trick Simone in order to get her thumbprint which is also needed to open the door. Soon after she filmed a supporting role in Hannah Davis and David Conolly's The Understudy where she played Police Chief Kinsky. While it has appeared at numerous film festivals, a DVD release date for The Understudy has not been announced.

Aylesworth continued her work in independent productions, filming a small part for Steven Kampmann's independent movie, Buzzkill. It was given a limited release in January 2012. In April 2008, Aylesworth was cast in a recurring role on ER, playing hospital chaplain Julia Dupree. Originally, Dupree was to appear in 5 episodes with the purpose of attracting the attention of Dr. Gates (John Stamos). Her role was extended for two additional episodes, but concluded due to the suspension of filming resulting from the 2007-2008 WGA Strike. A month later Aylesworth filmed a supporting role in the Steve Morris independent comedy The Assistants, which tells the story of a group of Hollywood assistants who are scheming to have their script turned into a feature film. Aylesworth has said independent productions like these and past films such as No Deposit, No Return, are her preferred types of film.

=== Ongoing television work ===
Aylesworth has continued with one-off guest roles and recurring roles on episodes of various television dramas. In 2009, she portrayed Amy Goodspeed in three Season 5 episodes of Lost. She has also appeared in recurring roles, including five episodes in season three of Damages, as Dr. Malia Waincroft on seven episodes over three seasons of CBS's Hawaii Five-0, and nine episodes as Allie Jones over two seasons of Scorpion in 2016 and 2017.

=== Theater work ===
Aylesworth has appeared in off-Broadway productions. She performed in the 2006 production of Etan Frankel's The Fearless at the Summer Play Festival and The New Group (naked)'s 2007 production of Heather Lynn MacDonald's Expats.

== Personal life ==
As of February 2007, Aylesworth had resided in New York City since 1993. Aylesworth is married to Rob Clare, a scholar and expert on Shakespearean theater.

As of the fall of 2022, Reiko is a Professor of Practice at Southern Methodist University's Meadows School of the Arts theater department.

== Filmography ==
Film roles
Year	Title	Role	Notes
1996	Childhood's End	Laurie Cannon	
1998	You've Got Mail	Thanksgiving Guest	
1999	Random Hearts	Mary Claire Clark	
1999	Man on the Moon	Mimi	
2000	No Deposit, No Return	Sue	
2005	Shooting Vegetarians	Daisy	Filmed 1999–2000, released direct-to-video in 2005
2005	Crazylove	Letty Mayer	
2007	The Killing Floor	Audrey Levine	
2007	Mr. Brooks	Sheila	
2007	Aliens vs. Predator: Requiem	Kelly O'Brien	
2008	The Understudy	Chief Kinsky	
2008	The Assistants	Cassie Levine	
2012	Buzzkill	Sara	
2012	Bad Parents	Laurie	
2017	Oh Lucy!	Kei	
2019	Rapid Eye Movement	Charlene Johnson	
2020	Dark Harbor	Regina Newhall	

Television roles
Year	Title	Role	Notes
1993–1994	One Life to Live	Rebecca Lewis	[unknown episodes]
1996	Lifestories: Families in Crisis	Rita	Episode: "Someone Had to Be Benny"
1997	Law & Order	Tiffany Sherman	Episode: "We Like Mike"
1998	A Will of Their Own	Annie Jermaine	Miniseries
1999	Now and Again	Dr. Taylor	Episode: "By the Light of the Moon"
2000	Sherman's March	Becca Coltrane	Television film
2000	The West Wing	Janine	Episode: "Lies, Damn Lies and Statistics"
2000	Law & Order: Special Victims Unit	A.D.A. Erica Alden	3 episodes
2001	All Souls	Dr. Philomena Cullen	Main cast
2002	Ed	Kate Harrison	Episode: "Ends and Means"
2002	The American Embassy	Liz Shoop	Main cast
2002–2006	24	Michelle Dessler	Main cast (season 3); Recurring cast (season 2, 4); Guest role (season 5); 62 episodes
2003	The Dead Zone	Natalie Connor	Episode: "Deja Voodoo"
2004	CSI: Crime Scene Investigation	Chandra Moore	Episode: "Viva Las Vegas"
2005	Fathers and Sons	Business Woman	Television film
2006	3 lbs	Dr. Adrienne Holland	Unsold pilot, reshot using different actress
2006	Magma: Volcanic Disaster	Natalie Sheppard	Television film
2006	Conviction	Julie Phelps	Episode: "Deliverance"
2007	The Knights of Prosperity	Simone Cashwell	2 episodes
2007	ER	Julia Dupree	Recurring role (season 14)
2009	Lost	Amy Goodspeed	Recurring role (season 5)
2009	The Forgotten	Linda Manning	Episode: "Unaired pilot"; reshot using different actress
2009–2010	Stargate Universe	Sharon	3 episodes
2010	Damages	Rachel Tobin	Recurring role (season 3)
2010	The Good Wife	Nora Vashley	Episode: "On Tap"
2011–2014	Hawaii Five-0	Dr. Malia Waincroft	Recurring role
2011	Lights Out	Jennifer	3 episodes
2012	Elementary	Miranda Molinari	Episode: "Flight Risk"
2012	Person of Interest	Agent Vickers	Episode: "C.O.D."
2013	King & Maxwell	Liz Allen	Episode: "King's Ransom"
2013	Drop Dead Diva	June Fraizer	Episode: "Fool for Love"
2014	Revolution	Marion Kelly	4 episodes
2016	NCIS	Mrs. Marshall	Episode: "Homefront"
2016–2017	Scorpion	Allie Jones	Recurring role
2017	Salvation	Rhonda Cheng	Episode: "Indivisible"
2017	SEAL Team	Dr. Julie Kruger	Episode: "Tip of the Spear"
2018	The Good Doctor	Louisa DeLeon	Episode: "Carrots"
2019	Bull	Carolyn Kelly	Episode: "Prior Bad Acts"
2020	Tommy	Sasha	Episode: "Lifetime Achievement"
2021–2024	Hit-Monkey	Maki Matsumoto / Lady Bullseye, Yuki	Voices, 7 episodes
2023	Carol & The End of the World	Guest performer	Episode: "The Beetle Broach"
2026	Chicago Med	Emily Matthews	Episode: "Twist & Shout"

Video games
Year	Title	Role
2006	24: The Game	Michelle Dessler
2022	Hindsight	Mary

== Theater ==
Year	Theater/Festival	Location	Production	Role
1992–93	Intiman Theatre Company	Seattle	Peter Pan	Wendy
1996	Philadelphia Festival Theater; George Street Playhouse	Philadelphia; New Brunswick, N.J.	Cheap Sentiment	Meg Van Dyke
1996	Primary Stages Theater	New York City	Missing / Kissing: Missing Marisa / Kissing Christine	Server in "Kissing"
1997	American Place Theatre	New York City	Robbers	Lucinda
2002	McCarter Theatre Center	Princeton, N.J.	Humpty Dumpty	Spoon
2005	Williamstown Theatre Festival	Williamstown, Mass.	Top Girls	Lady Nijo/Win
2017	Antaeus Theatre	Los Angeles	Les Liaison Dangereuses	Marquise de Merteuil
2019	The Geffen Playhouse	Los Angeles	Black Super Hero Magic Mamma	Connie/ Lady Vulture
2025	Boston Court Pasadena	Pasadena, C.A.	Frou-Frou: A Menagerie of Sorts	Mamma
