= Michael Loceff =

Michael Loceff (born 1952) was a writer and co-executive producer of the hit television series 24, which aired on the Fox television network. He worked on the show for six and a half seasons, but left after the writer's strike.

He is among the 2006 Emmy Award recipients for the 24 series. Prior to 24, he worked with fellow 24 producers Joel Surnow, Robert Cochran, Jon Cassar, Brad Turner, and Peter Lenkov on La Femme Nikita.

He is the cousin of 24 co-creator Joel Surnow

He was then a professor at Foothill College in Los Altos Hills, California, teaching computer science courses online.

- In 2015, Professor Loceff also published a very detailed Volume 1 book on quantum computing called "A Course in Quantum Computing for the Community College 〈c | Q | c〉"

He is now retired.

== Trivia ==
- Loceff has sneaked in several subtle references to his teaching career on 24. Milo Pressman's CTU password is "foothill94022." 94022 is the postal code for Foothill College in Los Altos Hills, California. In a previous episode of the show, a character used the secret password "Etudes", the name of his online teaching software.
