= Naayi Neralu (novel) =

1968 novel by S.L. Bhyrappa

- Cover of novel's 2017–18 publication
- Author: S.L. Bhyrappa
- Language: Kannada
- Subject: Parapsychology, Reincarnation
- Genre: Fiction
- Published: 1968, Sahitya Bhandara, Bangalore
- Publication place: India
- Media type: Print (Paperback)
- Preceded by: Jalapaata
- Followed by: Tabbaliyu Neenade Magane
- Website: Official website

Naayi Neralu (meaning: Shadow of the Dog) is a novel written by S.L. Bhyrappa, which was first published on 1968. As of May 2018, it had 17 reprints and has been translated into Hindi and Gujarati languages. Based on the novel, a movie Naayi Neralu, in Kannada language was released in 2006, directed by Girish Kasaravalli.

The novel is about a young boy who claims to be the rebirth/reincarnation of a previous life.

== See also ==
=== S. L. Bhyrappa's novels ===
- Bheemakaaya
- Dharmashree
- Doora saridaru
- Matadana
- Tabbaliyu Neenade Magane
- Gruhabhanga
- Nirakarana
- Grahana
- Daatu
- Anveshana
- Parva
- Nele
- Sakshi
- Anchu
- Tantu
- Saartha
- Mandra
- Aavarana
- Kavalu
- Yaana
- Uttarakaanda

=== S. L. Bhyrappa's autobiography ===
- Bhitti
