= Tabbaliyu Neenade Magane (novel) =

1968 novel by S. L. Bhyrappa

- Cover of novel's 2017-18 publication
- Author: S L Bhyrappa
- Language: Kannada
- Genre: Fiction
- Published: 1968 Sahitya Bhandara, Balepet, Bangalore.
- Publication place: India
- Media type: Print (Hardcover & Paperback)
- Preceded by: Naayi Neralu
- Followed by: Gruhabhanga
- Website: Official website

Tabbaliyu Neenade Magane (meaning: You've become an orphan, son) is a novel written by novelist S.L. Bhyrappa. This book revolves around a conflict between culture and modern views of an educated person in a village of India. The author introduced the characters and developed them throughout the book, representing different views and fighting for moral truth and scientific truths. This book is suitable for people who want to know about village life and background of the cow as a God in India.

The movie Tabbaliyu Neenade Magane also called Godhuli co-directed by Girish Karnad and B. V. Karanth, released in 1977 was based on this novel.

== See also ==
=== S.L. Bhyrappa's novels ===
- Bheemakaaya
- Dharmashree
- Doora saridaru
- Matadana
- Naayi Neralu
- Gruhabhanga
- Nirakarana
- Grahana
- Daatu
- Anveshana
- Parva
- Nele
- Sakshi
- Anchu
- Tantu
- Saartha
- Mandra
- Aavarana
- Kavalu
- Yaana
- Uttarakaanda

=== S.L. Bhyrappa's autobiography ===
- Bhitti
