= List of Sahitya Akademi Translation Prize winners for Sanskrit =

List of winners of a literary honor in India

Part of a series on

Sahitya Akademi Awards
Category
Sahitya Akademi Award winners by language
- Assamese
- Bengali
- Bodo
- Dogri
- English
- Gujarati
- Hindi
- Kannada
- Kashmiri
- Konkani
- Maithili
- Malayalam
- Marathi
- Meitei (Manipuri)
- Nepali
- Odia
- Punjabi
- Rajasthani
- Sanskrit
- Santali
- Sindhi
- Tamil
- Telugu
- Urdu
Sahitya Akademi Translation Prizes
- Assamese
- Bengali
- Bodo
- Dogri
- English
- Gujarati
- Hindi
- Kannada
- Kashmiri
- Konkani
- Maithili
- Malayalam
- Marathi
- Meitei (Manipuri)
- Nepali
- Odia
- Punjabi
- Rajasthani
- Sanskrit
- Santali
- Sindhi
- Tamil
- Telugu
- Urdu
Sahitya Akademi Yuva Puraskar
- Assamese
- Bengali
- Bodo
- Dogri
- English
- Gujarati
- Hindi
- Kannada
- Kashmiri
- Konkani
- Maithili
- Malayalam
- Meitei (Manipuri)
- Marathi
- Nepali
- Odia
- Punjabi
- Rajasthani
- Sanskrit
- Santali
- Sindhi
- Tamil
- Telugu
- Urdu
Sahitya Akademi Bal Sahitya Puraskar
- Assamese
- Bengali
- Bodo
- Dogri
- English
- Gujarati
- Hindi
- Kannada
- Kashmiri
- Konkani
- Maithili
- Malayalam
- Meitei (Manipuri)
- Marathi
- Nepali
- Odia
- Punjabi
- Rajasthani
- Sanskrit
- Santali
- Sindhi
- Tamil
- Telugu
- Urdu
Related
- Eighth Schedule to the Constitution of India
- Official Languages Commission
- List of languages by number of native speakers in India

Sahitya Akademi Translation Prizes are given each year to writers for their outstanding translations work in the 24 languages, since 1989.

== Recipients ==
Following is the list of recipients of Sahitya Akademi translation prizes for their works written in Sanskrit. The award, as of 2019, consisted of ₹50,000.

Year	Translator	Title of the translation	Original title	Original language	Genre	Original Author	References
1990	Ganesha Sharma	Vijananam Samajasca	Vijnana Aur Samaja	Hindi	Treatise	Sarayu Prasad Gupta	
1991	Mallikarjun Paraddi	Satikam Kabirdasashatakam	Kabir Dohavali	Hindi	Couplets	Kabir	
1993	Amir Chandra Shastri	Nehrucarita Mahakavyam	Autobiography	English	Biography	Jawaharlal Nehru	
1994	Kashinath Mishra	Vidyapati Shatakam	Vtdyapatt	Maithili	Poetry	Vidyapati	
1995	K.P. Narayana Pisharodi	Srikrishnacharitam Mahakavyam	Srikrishnacharitam Mahakavyam	Malayalam	Epic	Kunchan Nambiar	
1996	Kshirod Chandra Dash	Chilika	Chilika	Oriya	Poetry	Radhanath Ray	
1997	Shyam Vimal	Vyamoha	Vyamoha	Hindi	Novel	Shyam Vimal	
1998	Bihari Lal Mishra	Sharatsaptakam	Selection	Bengali	Short Stories	Sarat Chandra Chattopadhyay	
2000	Dipak Ghosh	Sanskritara-vindrasangitam	Collection	Bengali	Poetry	Rabindranath Tagore	
2001	R. Sri Hari	Prapanchapadi	Prapanchapadulu	Telugu	Poetry	C. Narayana Reddy	
2004	Jagannath Pathak	Ghaliba Kavyam	Diwan-e-Ghalib	Urdu	Poetry	Mirza Asadullah Khan Ghalib	
2005	Janardhan Hedge	Dharmasri	Dharmasri	Kannad	Novel	S. L. Bhyrappa	
2006	H.V. Nagaraja Rao	Sartha	Sartha	Kannad	Novel	S. L. Bhyrappa	
2007	Vishu Belani	Agni Sakshi	Agnisakshi	Malayalam	Novel	Lalithambika Antharjanam	
2008	A. V. Subramanian	Sringarapadyavali	Kuṟuntokai	Tamil	Poetry	Sangam Poets	
2009	Prem Narayan Dwivedi	Srimadramacharitamanasam	Ramcharitmanas	Awadhi	Epic Poem	Tulsidas	
2010	H. R. Vishwasa	Aavaranam	Aavarana	Kannada	Novel	S. L. Bhyrappa	
2011	K. Ramakrishna Variyer	Gitanjali	Gitanjali	Bengali	Poetry	Rabindranath Tagore	
2012	Bhagirathinanda	Bharatvarsham	Bharatvarsha	Odia	Poetry	Sitakant Mahapatra	
2013	Abhiraj Rajendra Mishra	Vijayaparva	Vijaya parva	Hindi	Play	Ramakumar Varma	
2014	Narayan Dash	Vatyasarah	Jhad O Anyanya Kahani	Odia	Short Stories	ChandraShekhara das Varma	
2015	Tarashankar Sharma 'Pandeya'	Ahmev Radha Ahmev Krishna	Mein Hi Radha Main Hi Krishna	Hindi	Poetry	Gulab Kothari	
2016	Rani Sadasiva Murty	Vivkatapuspakarandah	Ontari Pula Butta	Telugu	Poetry	Rallabandi Kavita Prasad	
2017	Praveen Pandya	Soundaryasrotarswini Narmada	Saundaryana Nadi Narmada	Gujarati	Travelogue	Amritlal Vegad	
2018	Dipak Kumar Sharma	Asama Vanmanjari	Asama Vanmanjari	Assamese	Poetry	Various Authors	
2019	Prem Shankar Sharma	Rashmirathi	Rashmirathi	Hindi	Poetry	Ramdhari Singh Dinkar	
2020	Manjusha Kulkarni	Prakashmargh	Prakashvata	Marathi	Biography	Prakash Aamate	
2021	Shatavadhani Ganesh & B. N. Shashikiran	Mahaabraahmanah	Mahabrahmana	Kannada	Novel	Devudu Narasimha Sastri	
2022	Gopabandhu Mishra	Amrutaphalam	AmrutaPhala	Odia	Novel	Manoj Das	
2023	Ruchiraah Baalakathaah	Nagaratna Hegde	Makkaligaagi Nanna Necchina Kathegalu	Kannada	Short Stories	Sudha Murty	

== See also ==
- List of Sahitya Akademi Award winners for Sanskrit
