= H. R. Vishwasa =

Indian writer

Dr. H. R. Vishwasa (also written H. R. Vishwas) is a Sanskrit scholar residing in Mangalore, India. He won a Sahitya Akademi Translation Prize in 2010 for translating S. L. Bhyrappa's Kannada novel Aavarana into Sanskrit.

He has been involved with Sanskrit revival. He was the editor of the Sanskrit monthly magazine Sambhashana Sandesha, for five years. He is the "Akhil Bharatiya Prashikshan Pramukh" (All-India Chief of Teaching) as well as Prakashana Pramukh (Chief of Publishing) of the organisation Samskrita Bharati, and was on the working committee of the first World Sanskrit Book Fair, held in January 2011. He was one of the teachers in a Sanskrit-teaching series that was commissioned by the Rashtriya Sanskrit Sansthan and was broadcast on DD Bharati and later on Gyan Darshan. He wrote a weekly column, "Sangata", for the newspaper Hosa Digantha. He was also in the Karnataka government committee deciding Sanskrit syllabus for classes 5 to 7.

He has an M.A. in Sanskrit and a doctorate from Kuvempu University, as well as a Vidwat degree. His wife Shantala also works for Samskrita Bharati.

His translation of Avarana took six months and was released in November 2008. His Kannada book Matte Hottitu Hebrew Hanate was released by the Kannada scholar G. Venkatasubbaiah, and was briefly on the best-seller list in 2006. He also translated Bhyrappa's Parva into Sanskrit, which was released in 2012. He won the Sahitya Akademi's Bala Sahitya Puraskar for the year 2013, for "Marjalasya Mukham Drishtam", a book of plays.

== Works ==
Books in Kannada

- Matte Hottitu Heebru Hanate, 2006
- Pididu Samskrita Sootrava
- Sangham sharanam gachchami 2019

Books in Sanskrit

- Apashchimah Pashchime (अपश्चिमः पश्चिमे, An Easterner in the West, travel-writing)
- Hemacchakatika (Gold Toy Cart; the title is a reference to Mrcchakatika)
- Koushala Bhodhinee (handbook for Sanskrit teachers)
- Translation of Avarana
- Naaticharaami 2019

Papers

- Analysis of sentences in Sanskrit and Knowledge Representation Techniques by HR Vishwasa, RV Hudli and T Vishwanathan, presented at Knowledge Representation in Sanskrit conference, 1986, Bangalore
