= Anveshana (disambiguation) =

Anveshana is a 1985 Indian Telugu-language thriller film

Anveshana may also refer to:

- Anveshana (novel), a 1976 novel written by S. L. Bhyrappa
- Anveshana (2002 film), a 2002 Indian Telugu-language horror film

== See also ==
- Anveshane, a 1983 Indian Kannada-language film
- Anweshanam, a 1972 Indian Malayalam-language thriller drama film
- Anveshanam, a 2020 Indian Malayalam-language thriller drama film
- Anveshitha, a 1997 Indian Telugu-language supernatural television series
