= Vamsa Vruksham =

- Poster
- Directed by: Bapu
- Screenplay by: Mullapudi Venkata Ramana
- Based on: Vamsha Vriksha by S. L. Bhyrappa
- Produced by: Harischandra Reddy; A. Raghava Reddy
- Starring: Anil Kapoor; J. V. Somayajulu; Kanta Rao; Mukkamala; Jyothi
- Cinematography: Baba Azmi
- Edited by: Anil Malnad
- Music by: K. V. Mahadevan
- Release date: 20 November 1980
- Running time: 166 minutes
- Country: India
- Language: Telugu

Vamsa Vruksham (transl. The genealogy tree) is a 1980 Indian Telugu-language drama film directed by Bapu. The film stars Anil Kapoor, J. V. Somayajulu, Kanta Rao, Mukkamala, and Jyothi. The film marked Kapoor's debut as an actor in a lead role. It is a remake of the 1972 Kannada film Vamsha Vriksha which was based on S. L. Bhyrappa's novel of same name. Mullapudi Venkata Ramana wrote the screenplay.

Released on 20 November 1980, the film was not commercially successful.

== Cast ==
- Anil Kapoor
- J. V. Somayajulu
- Kanta Rao
- Mukkamala
- Jyothi
- Jhansi
- Dubbing Janaki
- Kona Madhusudana Rao
- Sujatha
- Jitendra Mohan
- Ramanatham
- Sripada Hanumachchastri

== Soundtrack ==
The film features score by K. V. Mahadevan with lyrics by C. Narayana Reddy.

== Awards ==
Filmfare Awards South

- Filmfare Best Director Award (Telugu) – Bapu
- Filmfare Best Actress Award (Telugu) - Jyothi
