= Shatavadhani Ganesh =

Polyglot, Avadhani and an author

Shatavadhani R. Ganesh
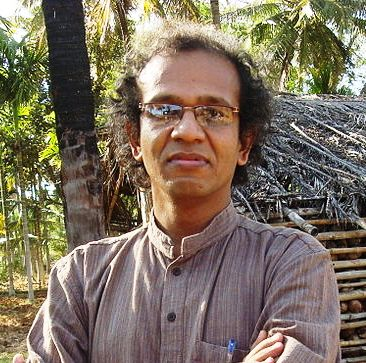
- Shathavadhi R. Ganesh
- Born: R. Ganesh; 4 December 1962 (age 63); Kolar, Kolar district, Karnataka, India
- Education: University of Visvesvaraya College of Engineering, Indian Institute of Science , Kannada University
- Occupations: Avadhana, author, extempore poet
- Writing career
- Subjects: Sanskrit, Kannada, Telugu, Tamil

R. Ganesh (also known popularly as Shatavadhani Ganesh, born 4 December 1962) is a practitioner of the art of avadhana, a polyglot, an author in Sanskrit and Kannada and an extempore poet in multiple languages. He has performed more than 1300 avadhanas, in Kannada, Sanskrit, Telugu and Prakrit. He is known for extempore composition of poetry (āśukavita) during these performances, and even of chitrakavya. He is the only Śatāvadhāni from Karnataka. He once set a record by composing poetry for twenty-four hours continuously. From 30 November 2012 to 2 December 2012, he performed the first ever Shatavadhana entirely in Kannada. On 16 February 2014, in Bangalore, he performed his 1000th avadhāna.

He was awarded the Padma Bhushan in 2026.

== Childhood and education ==
Ganesh was born on 4 December 1962 in a brahmin family, in Kolar, Karnataka, to R. Shankar Narayan Aiyar and K. V. Alamelamma. Ganesh picked up Kannada, Telugu and Tamil from his environment as a child. Also in his childhood, he read Sanskrit and Kannada literature and was writing poetry at the age of sixteen. He learned English at school, and he later learned several other languages like Prakrit, Pali, Tamil, Hindi, Marathi, Greek, Latin and Italian. He has a B.E. degree in mechanical engineering from UVCE, an MSc (Engineering) degree in metallurgy from IISc, pursued research in materials science and metallurgy, has an MA degree in Sanskrit, and a D. Litt in Kannada, which was awarded by Hampi University for his thesis on the art of Avadhana in Kannada.

== Avadhana ==
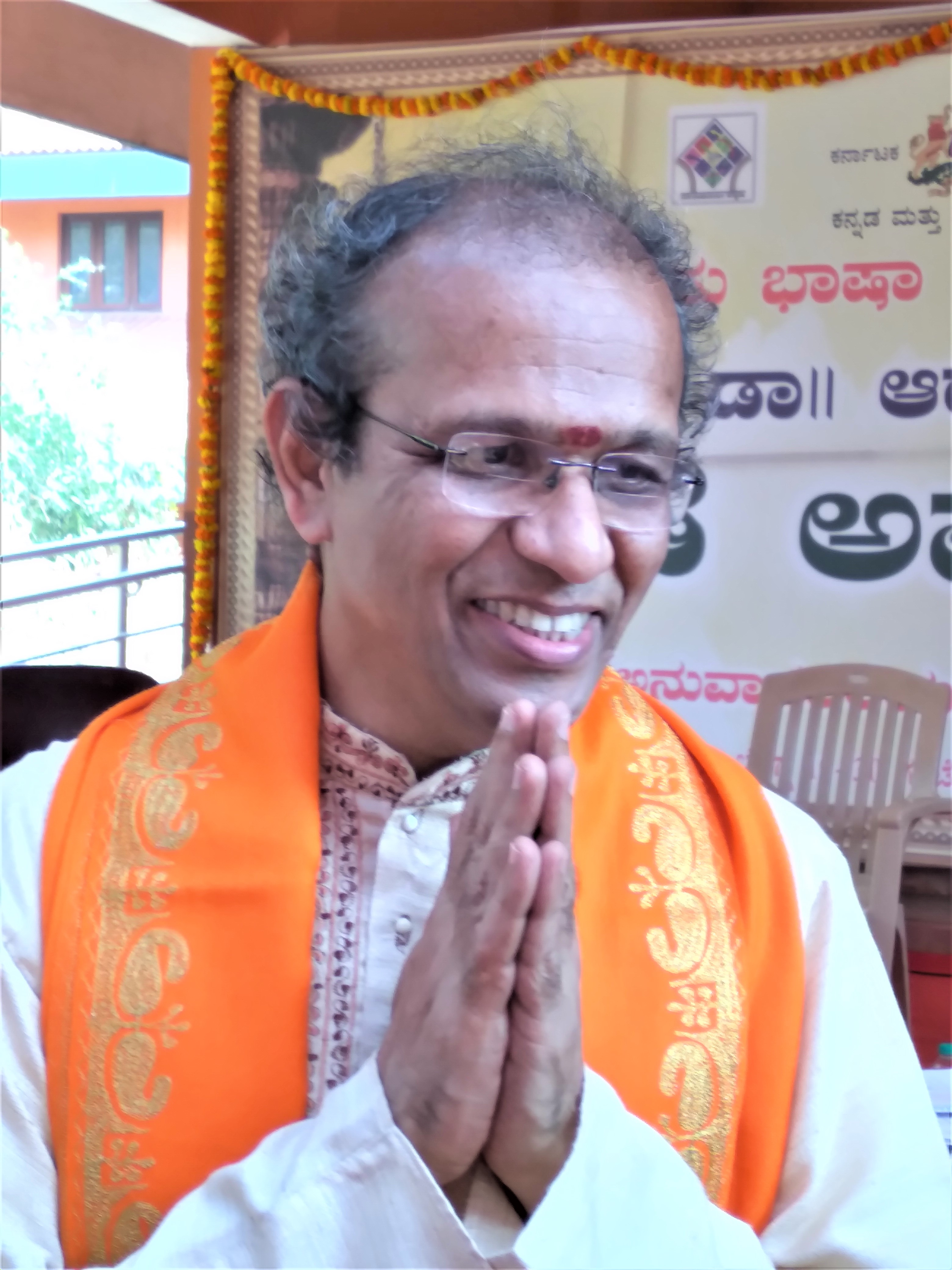
Ganesh at Bangalore Astavadhana, at Kuvempu Bhasha Pradhikara, 14 February 2021

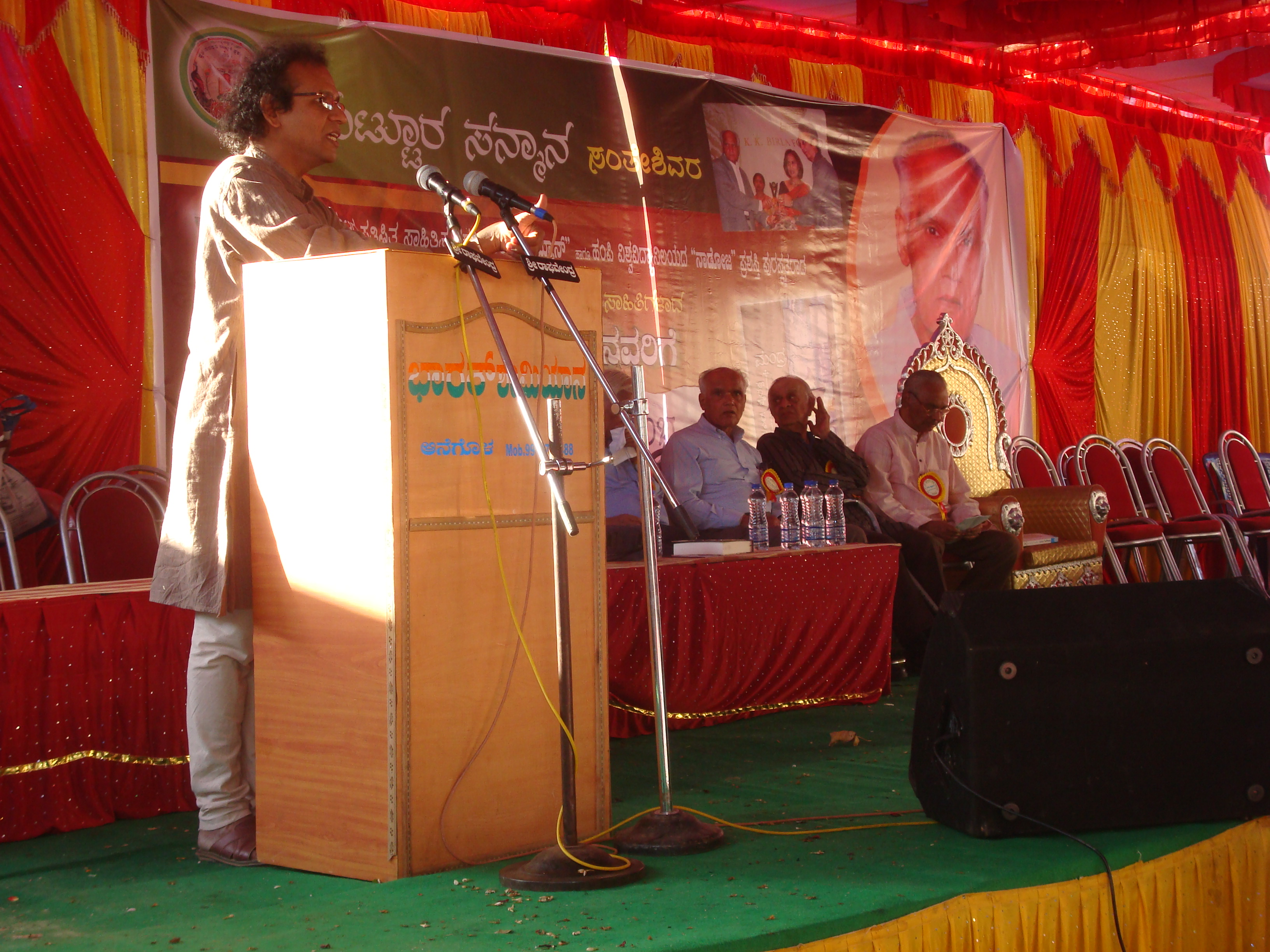
Ganesh speaking in the felicitation program of S. L. Bhyrappa

Ganesh is well known for his performances of avadhana, in which he composes extempore solutions in metrical verse to problems posed in parallel by the pṛcchakas on stage, satisfying the constraints imposed by them, while simultaneously dealing with interruptions designed to break his concentration. The performance tests poetic skill, creativity, memory, concentration, scholarship, and wit. The main variants are the Aṣṭāvadhāna (eight pṛcchakas) and Śatāvadhāna (hundred pṛcchakas), both of which he performs.

Although there are records of Bellave Narahari Sastry performing avadhana in Kannada during 1933–36 (having learnt it from Telugu's Pisupati Chidambara Shastri), there was no living tradition of avadhana in Kannada when Ganesh took it up; thus he is credited with reviving avadhana in Kannada. In 1981, after seeing an avadhana performance for the first time, by Lepakshi Medavaram Mallikarjuna Sharma, he tried one himself in front of his friends. He performed 13 astavadhana between 1981 and 1987. In 1987, he gave a major astavadhana performance at Kolar in the centenary year of D. V. Gundappa, where thousands of people and several learned persons assembled. His 100th and 200th astavadhanas were also performed at Kolar, his native place. His astavadhanas became very popular and he gave hundreds of performances, some of which were viewed by people even in pouring rain. He has performed avadhanas using eight languages, including Sanskrit, Kannada and Telugu. He is also credited with introducing chitrakavya into avadhana, previously considered impossible to do in an avadhana. He has given more than 20 avadhana performances in American and European countries.

He performed his first Shatavadhana at Bharatiya Vidya Bhavan, Bangalore on 15 December 1991. He did another one 15 days later, then one each again in 1992 and 1993, with his fifth, the first to be done entirely in Kannada, in 2012.

In addition to his D. Litt thesis The Art of Avadhana in Kannada and the forthcoming Avadhana Sahasra, he has written books about the art of Avadhana to groom future avadhanis including Shatavadhana Sharade, Shatavadhana Srividye and Sataavadhaana Shaashvati. He has also started lectures on poetry composition, prosody and poetics on the website of "Padyapaana" organisation.

== Other work ==
He performed a shatavadhana in a single day in 1991. He also gives public lectures, on dance (nāṭya śāstra), music, art, culture, literature, poetics, etc. In his kAvya-chitra shows, he performs with painter B.K.S.Varma, composing poems while the latter paints. He has also written lyrics and composed verses for dance performances. He learned the performance art Yakshagana and conceived the idea of eka vyakthi yakshagana (single-person Yakshagana), of which several performances have been given by Mantapa Prabhakara Upadhyaya. He has played the role of Horatio (dubbed Harshananda) in a Sanskrit production of Hamlet. He has given multiple lectures on various topics in Gokhale Institute of Public affairs, most of which is published on YouTube.

== Literary works ==
- Kannadadalli Avadhanakale (The art of Avadhana in Kannada) (D. Litt thesis)
- Vitaana
- Nityaneeti
- ShriChakreshwari Stavana
- Sandhyadarshana
- Shatavadhanasharade
- Kavitegondu Kathe
- Dhoomadhoota, a parody of Meghaduta
- Samaanyadharma
- Neelakanthadeekshitana Shatakatraya
- Shaddarshana Sangraha
- Vanitaakavitotsava
- Kusumadevana Drishtantakalikaa Shataka mattu Neelakanthadeekshitana Shaantivilasa
- Vibhootipurusha Vidyaranya
- Human values in the code of Kautilya
- Human values in Manusmriti
- Human values in the Ramayana
- Human values in Telugu Literature
- Subhashita Samputa
- Alankaarashastra
- Bharateeya Kshaatra Parampare
- Brahmapuriya Bhikshuka
- Mannina Kanasu

Works in Sanskrit

Ganesh is considered one of the Sanskrit authors to have "carved a niche for themselves in twentieth century", and is credited with introducing new genres into Sanskrit literature. His works include:

- Anveṣaṇam, an allegorical one-act play (rūpaka), a satire on social evils (1984)
- Sāmbalaharī (khaṇḍakāvya) (1989)
- Śaṅkaravivekīyam, a poem with two readings (dvisandhānākavya)
- Antaḥkāntiḥ, a novel in blank verse, on the last days of Vivekananda
- Saugandhikā, a collection of sonnets in blank verse
- Citraculikā, an example of Chitrakavya.
- Śrīkṛṣṇa-laharī, 123 verses on Krishna
- Śrījāmba-laharī, 51 verses on Shiva
- Śṛṅgāra-laharī, 103 verses long
- Jātaśakuntalā, a 123-verse work on Shakuntala
- Ilākaivalyam, 154 verses in Vedic metre
- Evam api ṛtavaḥ, poem on the effects of the seasons on village life
- Cāṭucandrikā, 87 blank verses
- Śrīcandreśvarīstavanam (with Kannada translation)
- Madhusadma : a collection of Sanskrit poems 1st ed. R. Ganesh; with a foreword by K. Krishnamoorthy. Published 1989. Library of CongressPK3799.G29 M33 1989

== Awards ==
- Rajyotsava Prashasti (Karnataka State Award) for 1992 by the Government of Karnataka. At 29, he was the youngest person to have received the award.
- Rashtriya Yuva Pratibha Puraskar
- Kāvyakaṇṭhapraśasti
- Bādarāyaṇa-Vyāsa Puraskar awarded by the President of India for contributions to Sanskrit for the year 2003.
- 'Sediyapu Award' for the year 2010.
- Honorary doctorate (D. Litt) from Tumkur University in 2010.
- "Chit-prabhananda" award
- Erya Award for 2012.
- Sahitya Akademi Translation Prize 2021.
- Padma Bhushan, 2026

== Media gallery ==
Introduction about solo performance in Yakshagana by R. Ganesh

A two part lecture series by R. Ganesh on Dr. S. Srikanta Sastri’s Kannada magnum opus: Bharathiya Samskruthi

Music and analysis program of author S. L. Bhyrappa's Kannada novel Mandra, by R. Ganesh

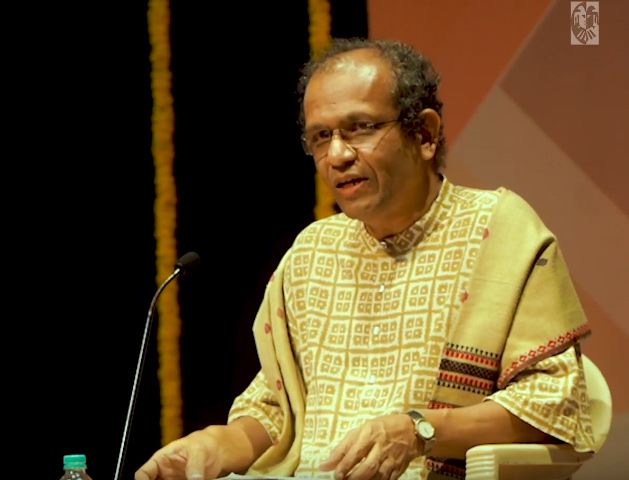
R. Ganesh sharing his thoughts on documentary on the making of theatrical play based on Parva (novel)
