= Bhitti =

Autobiography of S.L. Bhyrappa

- Cover of novel's 2017-18 publication
- Author: S.L. Bhyrappa
- Language: Kannada, Hindi, Marathi and English
- Subject: Autobiography
- Genre: Autobiography
- Publisher: Saahitya Bhandara, Bengaluru
- Publication date: 1996
- Publication place: India
- Media type: Print (Hardcover)
- Pages: 496
- ISBN: 9788170165491
- OCLC: 52108614
- Preceded by: Tantu (Novel)
- Followed by: Saartha (Novel)
- Website: Official website

Bhitti is the autobiography of kannada novelist S.L. Bhyrappa. First published in 1996, the book had 11 reprints as of May, 2018 and has been translated to Hindi, Marathi and English languages.
