= Cudavalli Chandrashekar =

Indian actor and director

- Born: 1955; Bangalore, Mysore State, India
- Died: 27 January 2018 (aged 63); Ottawa, Canada
- Other names: Edakallu Chandrashekar; Kudavalli Chandrashekar
- Occupations: Actor; film producer; director; visa officer
- Years active: 1969–2018
- Spouse: Sheela
- Children: 1

Cudavalli Chandrashekar (1955 – 27 January 2018) was an Indian actor, film producer and director known for his work in Kannada cinema. He appeared in child roles in films such as Namma Makkalu (1969) before making appearances in adult roles. He is noted for his performance in Puttanna Kanagal's Edakallu Guddada Mele (1973).

In 1984, Chandrashekar moved to Canada with his wife where he worked as a visa officer. He returned to films in the early 2000s and directed an adaptation of M. K. Indira's novel Poorvapara, which became the first Kannada film to be screened at the Toronto Film Festival. He appeared in a total of 40 films before his death in 2018. In recognition of his contributions to Kannada cinema, he was awarded the Rajyotsava Award by the government of Karnataka in 2004.

== Career ==
Chandrashekar was introduced to filmmaker R. Nagendra Rao who was on the lookout for a child actor for his film Namma Makkalu (1969) by his teacher and actor B. S. Narayana Rao. Chandrashekar went on to make his debut with that film. He then appeared in B. V. Karanth and Girish Karnad's Vamsha Vriksha (1971) alongside his senior at National College, Vishnuvardhan.

Chandrashekar auditioned for the role of Ramachari for Puttanna Kanagal's Naagarahaavu (1972), a role which eventually went to Vishnuvardhan. However, Kanagal cast him in his next film, Edakallu Guddada Mele (1973), which proved to be a major break in Chandrashekar's career. He played a brash motorbike-riding Nanjunda, who is a fresh college graduate. He develops a relationship with Madhavi (played by Jayanthi), the wife of a retired army captain, and go would on to infuse enthusiasm in the life of te couple. His performance received critical praise. He would go on to work with Kanagal in Dharani Mandala Madhyadolage (1981) and Maanasa Sarovara (1982). He also appeared alongside Dr. Rajkumar in Raja Nanna Raja (1976).

In 1984, Chandrashekar left for Canada with his wife Sheela. He worked as a visa officer at the High Commission of India in Ottawa before making corporate films. He returned to Kannada cinema in the early 2000s. In 2001, it was reported that he would make his debut as a director with Poorvapara, an adaptation of a novel of the same name by M. K. Indira. The novel however, despite set in the 1960s, felt like a "...a strong family subject" to Chandrashekar who set his film in the 2000s. He stated that he had bought the rights from Indira for the adaptation before her death. The film revolves around an elderly woman from Sringeri who moves to the US to live with her son, only to struggle with loneliness and a sense of displacement in her new surroundings. Chandrashekar received critical praise for his direction. It became the first Kannada film to be screened at the Toronto Film Festival. Chandrashekar's second and last directorial was the 2016 social-drama Kempammana Court Case, which dealt with the fight of a righteous lawyer for the lesser privileged. The film also featured his daughter, Tanya. Chandrashekar's final film acting roles came in Raju Kannada Medium (2018) and 3 Gante 30 Dina 30 Second (2018).

== Personal life ==
Chandrashekar was born and raised in Bangalore. He completed schooling at the National High School, Basavanagudi, before pursuing a degree in National College, Bengaluru.

Chandrashekar was married to engineer and danseuse Sheela. The couple moved to Canada in 1984. They had one daughter together, Tanya. Chandrashekar died from cardiac arrest on 27 January 2018 in Ottawa, Canada, aged 63.

== Filmography ==
=== As actor ===
Year	Title	Role	Notes	Ref.
1969	Namma Makkalu			
1970	Samskara			
1971	Vamsha Vriksha	Chinni		
1973	Edakallu Guddada Mele	Nanjunda		
1974	Sampathige Savaal		Cameo	
1975	Hamsageethe			
1976	Raja Nanna Raja	Murthy		
1976	Parivarthane			
1976	Besuge	Balu		
1976	Devara Duddu	Muddukrishna		
1976	Kanasu Nanasu	Sampath	Cameo	
1977	Sose Tanda Soubhagya	Shankar		
1978	Shankar Guru	Diwakar		
1978	Muyyige Muyyi	Sagar		
1979	Dharmasere			
1980	Vajrada Jalapatha			
1981	Guru Shishyaru	Singer	Cameo	
1982	Maanasa Sarovara		Cameo	
1983	Dharani Mandala Madhyadolage	Palegar		
1984	Benki Birugali	Chandrashekar		
2004	Poorvapara	Narendra	Also director and producer	
2005	Siddhu			
2008	Haage Summane			
2009	Karanji			
2009	Jeeva			
2011	Double Decker			
2014	Rose			
2015	Endendigu			
2016	Shivalinga	R. Chandrashekhar		
2016	Sri Sathyanarayana			
2016	Asthitva			
2016	Kempammana Court Case		Also director	
2017	Chakravarthy			
2018	Raju Kannada Medium			
2018	3 Gante 30 Dina 30 Second		Posthumous release	
2019	Omme Nishyabda Omme Yuddha	Aravind	Posthumous release	
