= Poorvapara =

- DVD cover
- Directed by: Cudavalli Chandrashekar
- Written by: Jayant Kaikini (dialogue)
- Screenplay by: Jayant Kaikini; Cudavalli Chandrashekar; K. S. Sridhar
- Based on: Poorvapara by M. K. Indira
- Produced by: Cudavalli Chandrashekar
- Starring: Geetha; Naveen Mayur; Lakshmi Gopalaswamy
- Cinematography: G. S. Bhasker
- Edited by: Suresh Urs
- Music by: Vijaya Bhaskar
- Production company: Rathi Enterprises
- Release date: 26 March 2004
- Running time: 140 minutes
- Country: India
- Language: Kannada

Poorvapara (transl. East and west/before and after) is a 2004 Indian Kannada-language drama film directed by Cudavalli Chandrashekar in his directorial debut. The film stars Geetha, Naveen Mayur and Lakshmi Gopalaswamy with Srinath and Chandrashekar in supporting roles.

The film is based on M. K. Indira's novel of the same name and is about the conflict that NRIs face about the separation from their loved ones. The film follows a sixty-year old mother from Sringeri who goes to the United States with the intention of bringing her son and daughter-in-law back to India. The film was the first Kannada film to be screened at the Toronto International Film Festival.

== Plot ==
Sharada, living in Sringeri, repeatedly receives letters from her son Sundar, who is settled in the United States, requesting her to visit him and his family. Though she initially refuses to leave, her relatives eventually persuade her to travel abroad. Reluctantly, Sharada undertakes the journey and arrives in the United States, where she is warmly welcomed by Sundar, his wife Vineetha, and their young daughter Chitti, whom she is meeting for the first time. Sundar and Vineetha make efforts to help her adjust to the unfamiliar environment and introduce her to Narendra, Sundar's close friend who has become like an elder brother to him.

As Sundar and Vineetha remain occupied with their professional lives and Chitti spends her days at school, Narendra gradually becomes Sharada's companion. He accompanies her to hospitals when she falls ill, takes her out for lunch, and helps her understand the lifestyle around her. Through these interactions, the two develop an emotional bond rooted in their shared connection to Sringeri and their sense of loneliness despite being surrounded by people. Narendra tells Sharada that he had moved to the United States with his parents as a child, but after their divorce and remarriages, he grew up feeling neglected and emotionally distant from both families. He later became close friends with Sundar during their time at university because of their shared roots in Sringeri. Sharada shares how her late husband had encouraged Sundar to pursue higher studies in the US. She also reveals that when her husband died of a heart attack, she informed Sundar only two months later, following her husband's wish not to disturb him when he had just become a father.

Despite being treated affectionately by her son's family, Sharada finds herself unable to overcome her longing for Sringeri and the life she left behind. She repeatedly urges Sundar to return to India along with Vineetha and Chitti, reminding him of their ancestral property and responsibilities as the family's only son. Sundar admits that he too misses his hometown and its people, but explains that his career, financial stability, and his daughter's education make it impossible for him to leave the US. Realising that her son cannot return with her, Sharada prepares to go back alone. Sundar is emotionally distressed by the decision and bids his mother a tearful farewell. Narendra, who has also grown disillusioned with his life in the US, decides to accompany Sharada back to Sringeri and settle there permanently.

== Cast ==
- Geetha as Sharada
- Srinath as Sharada's husband
- Naveen Mayur as Sundar
- Lakshmi Gopalaswamy as Vineetha
- Cudavalli Chandrashekar as Narendra
- Rasiya Robinson as Chitrangada "Chitti"
- Kitti
- Venkata Rao as Shyama Rao, Sharada's father
- Shanthamma as Sharada's aunt
- Padmavathi
- K. S. Kandoji Rao
- Sringeri Subbanna
- Vidhya
- Vishakh S.
- Radha Ramachandra as Savitri, Sharada's mother
- Sheela Chandrashekar
- Anil Kumble (guest appearance)

== Production ==
The film began production in late 2001 and marked Denver-based actor and telefilm director Cudavalli Chandrashekar's first directorial feature film venture. Geetha was cast as the mother in the film while Naveen Mayur, Lakshmi Gopalaswamy and Srinath played her son, daughter-in-law and husband respectively. Lakshmi Gopalaswamy debuted in Kannada cinema with this film. According to her, she plays "a girl who is traditionally brought up, finds her identity, re-discovers herself and tests new waters". The shooting for the film began in the second week of February 2002 after the cast and crew got visas. The film was shot for about fifteen days in Sringeri, Malenadu during Navaratri and for about fifteen to twenty days in Canada (where Chandrashekhar used to live) and the United States. Visuals of the snowfall in Denver were included in the film.

== Soundtrack ==
The music is composed by Vijaya Bhaskar. The lyrics are by Jayanth Kaikini, Sandhya Ravindranath and Vijaya Narasimha. The songs were sung by Rajesh Krishnan, Archana Udupa, Pallavi, Badriprasad and Sri Lakshmi. Three songs were shot in the United States.

== Reception ==
A critic from Chitraloka.com wrote that "Kudhavalli Chandrasekhar deserves full compliments for the adaptation of the novel on the screen. He has put in a great effort and this film is worth watching. There are no shortfalls. While America America film gives a travelogue feeling Poorvapara gives an account of America’s social life". A critic from Viggy wrote that "Poorvapara is a must see film for A.B.C.D.s and people who have Dollar dreams!" A critic from indiainfo.com wrote that "PURVAPARA speaks a lot through silence. Lot of things is untold in this film. This is not an anti-American film. American culture has not come in between the mother son relation, it is the son's expectations that comes in-between" and concluded that "Overall a good film". S. Viswanath of Deccan Herald wrote "Poorvaparva, a sure award-winner, draws excellent performances by the lead players. Here then is a film that is a must-see for the family. Kudos to Chandrashekar for a brave and brilliant effort".

== See also ==
- Indian diaspora
- Indian Americans
