= 3 Gante 30 Dina 30 Second =

- Directed by: Madhusudan G K
- Written by: Madhusudan G K
- Produced by: Chandrashekar R Padmashali
- Starring: Arun Gowda; Kavya Shetty
- Cinematography: Srinivas Ramaiah
- Edited by: Sri Crazy Mindz
- Music by: Sridhar V Sambhram
- Production company: Brain Share Creations Private Limited
- Release date: 19 January 2018
- Country: India
- Language: Kannada

3 Gante 30 Dina 30 Second (transl. 3 hours 30 days 30 seconds) is a Kannada-language romance film written and directed by G K Madhusudhan and produced by Chandrashekar R Padmashali under the banner Brain Share Creations Pvt Ltd. The film stars newcomers Arun Gowda & Kavya Shetty in lead roles along with Devaraj, Sudharani, Cudavalli Chandrashekar, Ramesh Bhat, Anantavelu, T.S.Nagabharana and Gururaj Hosakote. It was released on 19 January 2018 across Karnataka.

== Plot summary ==
The film follows Avinash, a successful and ambitious criminal lawyer, who believes time is money and avoids distractions such as romance. He meets Sharmila, a free-spirited journalist. When the two debate over love and practicality, they pose a challenge to spend 3 hours, 30 days, and 30 seconds together.

== Cast ==
- Arun Gowda as Avinash
- Kavya Shetty as Sharmila
- Devaraj
- Sudha Rani
- Cudavalli Chandrashekar
- Ramesh Bhat
- T. S. Nagabharana
- Gururaj Hosakote

== Soundtrack ==
3 Gante 30 Dina 30 Second

Soundtrack album by V. Sridhar
- Released: 2017
- Recorded: 2017
- Genre: Feature film soundtrack
- Length: 22:42
- Label: 3 Gante 30 Dina 30 Second
- Producer: V. Sridhar

V. Sridhar chronology
Sarvasva (2017)	3 Gante 30 Dina 30 Second (2017)	Raajaru (2017)

Composer V. Sridhar has scored the music. He has composed six songs in which acclaimed poet Jayant Kaykini, director G K Madhusudhan and Sukanya Gautam have penned down the lyrics.

Track-List
No.	Title	Lyrics	Singer(s)	Length
1.	"Arda Chandra"	Jayanth Kaikini	Sonu Nigam, Sriraksha	3:52
2.	"Manasu Manasu"	Madhusudhan & Goutam	Vijay Prakash	4:43
3.	"Bitti Buildup"	Madhusudhan	Tippu	4:01
4.	"Aaroythu Deepa"	Madhusudhan	Sridhar V. Sambhram	4:02
5.	"3 Gante 30 Dina 30 Second"	Madhusudhan	Chandan Shetty	2:15
6.	"Chitra Mathadide"	Madhusudhan & Sukanya	Vijay Prakash	3:49
Total length:				22:42

== Release ==
=== Critical reception ===
Sunayana Suresh of The Times of India gave the film a rating of 2/5 and wrote "If you are the old-school romantic, who believes that love stories need a lot of sentiments, a little action and the heroine transforming into being just the man's prop, this might be for you". A Sharadhaa, reviewing for The New Indian Express, said "In this slow-paced film, Aru Gowda looks diminished. He needs to work on his screen presence in his forthcoming projects. Kavya Shetty has put in an effort but can do better over time. The rest of the cast, including Chandrashekar, Devaraj and Sudha Rani, do well individually but fail as a supporting cast. Melodies by Sridhar V Sambram are placed at the right points, but they do not save the film". Shyam Prasad S reviewing for Bangalore Mirror rated the film 1.5 out of 5 stars, and wrote "It is an ordinary film made worse by its overconfidence".
