= B. K. S. Varma =

Indian painter (1949–2023)

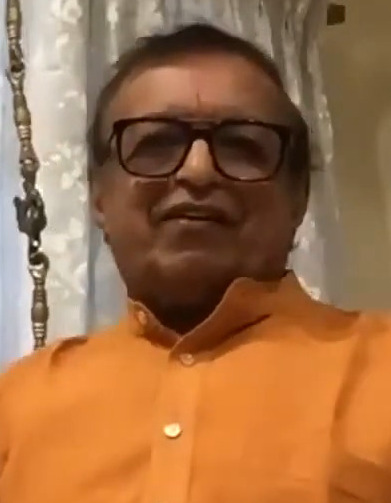
- Varma in 2021
- Born: 5 September 1948; Karnur, Attibele Taluk, Mysore State, India
- Died: 6 February 2023 (aged 74); Bengaluru, Karnataka, India
- Occupation: Artist
- Years active: 1987–2023

Bukkasagara Krishnaiah Srinivas Varma (5 September 1948 – 6 February 2023) was an Indian painter from Bangalore, whose subject was mainly environment and social issues presented in a surreal form. His depiction of Indian Gods has taken a new dimension. He also specialised in painting pictures in front of a large audience, in a short span of time, usually for poetry or dance.

== Early life ==
Varma was born in 1948 at Karnur, Attibele Taluk, which is situated on the outskirts of Bengaluru, Karnataka. He began sketching as a hobby at the age of six. His mother Smt. Jayalakshmi was an artist herself, his father Sri. Krishnamacharya was a musician. 1962 -68 – Varma was trained for painting and sculpture by Guru Sri. A.N. Subbarao at Kalamandir, Bangalore and by Sri. A.C.H. Acharya a sculptor from Devenahalli.

1964-67 – Joined Kalamandir School of art. Travelled all over India twice and met a lot of eminent people which included Dr. Radakrishna (ex.president of India), Deviprasad Roy Choudry, Jamini Roy, Nandal Bose, KK Hebbar, MF Hussien, Panikar, Rashtra Kavi Kuvempu, Shivarama Karanth and many others. During his travel across India he visited Ajanta, Ellora and many art museums and galleries to gain more knowledge and experience in the field.

1967 – Worked as an associate art director for the Bollywood movie "Aadmi". During the same time he painted the rocks in Hanumanth Nagar, Bengaluru (inspired by his visit to Ajanta) 1967-73 – He served as an artist for a number of journals and newspapers.

1977-1979 – He worked as an art director for Kannada movies "Banngarada Jinke", "Ninagagi Naanu", "Rajeshwari", "Chadurida Chitragalu" etc.

1988 – Two of his paintings were selected for Indian Festival at the Russia Utsav.

1990 – Collaborated with Dr. Shathaavadhaani. R. Ganesh in a performance – "Kavya Chitra" (a duet of poetry alongside painting) for 24 hours nonstop creating an all-time record.

1997 – He was invited by the Kuwait, for the event "Art Formula" at the Ambassador Bhavan wherein he exhibited his art works. During the same time he was also invited by the Bahrain King – Bin Kalifa, to exhibit his art works at the Bahrain Arts Society for the event "Bahrain Peace 2000".

1999 – He travelled to London and presented his art works at the "Art ‘n’ Auction" - Eastern Arts. He also exhibited his works at the "Nehru Centre", London.

2000 – Was selected by the Karnataka Government to be a part of the "Vishwa Kannada Sammelana", Houston. He put forth "Kavya Chitra", over 30 performances at different cities in America.

2005 – A performance – "Geeta Kuncha" at Singapore by the Kannada Sangha.

2010 – Biography published

== On the spot drawing ==
Varma specialised in paintings for specific topics given either in poetry or in dance form. He drew poetry of Shatavadhani Ganesh on topics suggested by audience. He also drew paintings for subjects discussed on a stage. He used a piece of rope as brush, mainly to finish quickly. He produced multiple paintings during a flute concert on 19 December 2006 and the paintings' subjects were depicted in the lyrics used by the flutists.

== Awards and recognition ==
- 1986 - "State Lalitkala Academy Award" Karnataka Chitrakala Partishath
- 2001 - Honoured by the Karnataka Government with the prestigious award "Karnataka Rajya Puruskar".
- 2001 - He received the Rajyothsava award
- 2011 - Honorary Doctorate by Bangalore University
