= Vamshavriksha (novel) =

1965 novel by S. L. Bhyrappa

- Cover page of 25th edition of Vamshavriksha
- Author: S. L. Bhyrappa
- Language: Kannada
- Genre: Fiction
- Publisher: Sahitya Bhandara, Bangalore
- Publication date: 1965
- Publication place: India
- Media type: Print (Hardcover)
- Pages: 560
- Preceded by: Matadana (1965)
- Followed by: Jalapaata (1967)
- Website: Official website

Vamshavriksha (also spelt as Vamsha Vruksha) (transl. The genealogy tree) is a 1965 novel written by the popular Kannada writer, philosopher and thinker S. L. Bhyrappa. Vamshavruksha received the Kannada Sahitya Academy Award in 1966. A Kannada movie Vamsha Vriksha based on this novel, which was directed by B. V. Karanth and Girish Karnad secured Best Regional Film and National Film Award for Best Direction at 19th National Film Awards. Vamshavriksha is a nuanced exploration of love and loss, tragedy and triumph, and is interwoven with spiritual, historical and cultural insights.

== Synopsis ==
A family tree spanning three generations with varying nuances of thought and emotion depicts the moral dilemma that arises in a small, tradition-bound town in Karnataka when long-established social norms are violated in the name of personal fulfillment. The protagonist, Katyayani, is in the midst of this revolution as she defies the taboo on widow remarriage, jeopardizes her relationship with her son, and lives between two emotionally damaged families struggling to preserve their integrity and lineage.

== Translation ==
Vamshavriksha novel is translated to Telugu, Marathi, Hindi, Urdu, Tamil and English languages.

== Awards ==
- Kannada Sahitya Academy Award in 1966.

== Film adaptations ==
This book was made into two films, In Kannada Vamsha Vriksha (1971), Starring Girish Karnad and Vishnuvardhan (debut film). In Telugu, Vamsa Vruksham (1972), Starring Anil Kapoor later dubbed to Hindi as Pyaar Ka Sindoor (1986).
