= Raja Nanna Raja =

- Film poster
- Directed by: A. V. Seshagiri Rao
- Written by: Salim–Javed
- Screenplay by: Chi. Udaya Shankar
- Produced by: Abbaiah Naidu
- Starring: Rajkumar; Aarathi; K. S. Ashwath; Cudavalli Chandrashekar
- Cinematography: R. Chittibabu
- Edited by: P Bhakthavathsalam
- Music by: G. K. Venkatesh
- Production company: Madhu Art Films
- Release date: 27 May 1976
- Country: India
- Language: Kannada

Raja Nanna Raja ( transl. Raja is my king) is a 1976 Kannada-language romantic thriller film, written by Salim–Javed, and the screenplay was created by Chi. Udaya Shankar. The film was directed by A. V. Sheshagiri Rao, and produced by A. L. Abbaiah Naidu. The film starred Rajkumar, Aarathi and Cudavalli Chandrashekar. The songs composed by G. K. Venkatesh were received extremely well and considered as evergreen hits.

The film deals with the theme of reincarnation and the lead actors romance in two getups, one in the modern day and another 200 years ago. The film was a huge success at the box-office. In an episode in Weekend with Ramesh, S. P. Balasubrahmanyam revealed that Ilaiyaraaja had worked under G. K. Venkatesh as a guitar player.

This movie popularized the role of the suave antihero in Kannada films. The film was released on 27 May 1976 and enjoyed a theatrical run of 25 weeks.

== Plot ==
Geetha is a young woman searching for the right man to marry. After meeting Murthy, she believes she has finally found her perfect match. Their families are pleased, and Geetha and Murthy soon become engaged. Everything seems to be moving happily towards their marriage. But an unexpected accident changes Geetha’s life. One day, while driving, Geetha accidentally hits a cyclist named Raja. He suffers a head injury, and a worried Geetha immediately takes him to the hospital. When Raja regains consciousness and sees Geetha, he is stunned. He claims that he recognizes her—not from the present, but from a previous life.

According to Raja, Geetha had been his lover nearly two hundred years ago. Geetha is shocked and irritated by his words. She assumes that Raja is confused because of his head injury and refuses to take him seriously. But Raja does not give up. He repeatedly approaches Geetha, insisting that they were deeply in love in their previous birth. His constant presence begins to disturb her. What initially seemed like the confused behaviour of an injured man soon feels like stalking. Geetha becomes increasingly angry and frightened. Concerned about her, Geetha’s uncle meets Raja privately. Believing that Raja may be doing all this for money, he offers him money in exchange for leaving Geetha alone. Raja refuses and tells her uncle that money means nothing to him and that Geetha is his lifeline. Meanwhile, Murthy becomes furious with Raja’s interference in their lives. Unable to tolerate him any longer, Murthy sends some men to attack Raja. Raja fights back and manages to survive. Still, he refuses to walk away from Geetha. Eventually, Raja asks Geetha for just one chance to prove his extraordinary story. He tells her that he remembers the place where they supposedly lived two hundred years earlier and asks her to accompany him there. Although hesitant, Geetha’s curiosity finally overcomes her fear.

Raja takes her to an old palace. Inside, Geetha is astonished to discover two ancient portraits. One looks remarkably like Raja and the other looks exactly like her. Standing before the portraits, Raja begins telling her the story of their previous life.

Two hundred years ago, Raja says, he was a prince who lived in that very palace. Geetha, however, was a simple village woman named Ganga. The prince fell deeply in love with Ganga. But he knew that if she discovered his royal identity, she might be influenced by his position and wealth. Wanting her to love him for the man he was rather than for his title, he disguised himself as an ordinary villager. Ganga eventually fell in love with him. Their happiness did not last. When the king discovered that his son had fallen in love with an ordinary village woman, he strongly opposed their relationship. Determined to be together despite the king’s objections, the young lovers decided to elope. But before they could escape, the king’s men caught them. Their love story ended tragically when both were killed. Raja tells Geetha that after two hundred years, fate has brought them together again. Geetha is left numb. The portraits and Raja’s detailed story shake her deeply, yet accepting something as unbelievable as reincarnation is almost impossible for her. Confused and emotionally overwhelmed, she leaves the palace. Her behaviour begins to change. She postpones her marriage to Murthy because she needs time to understand what is happening. Murthy becomes increasingly frustrated. Seeing Geetha’s emotional condition, her uncle suggests that she take a vacation in Madikeri. A change of surroundings, he believes, might give her some peace and also help her escape Raja’s constant presence. Geetha agrees and travels to Madikeri with Murthy. But even there, Raja appears. Exhausted and distressed, Geetha begs him to leave her alone. Raja still refuses to disappear from her life. Murthy finally loses his patience. He secretly contacts a local henchman named Danny and arranges to have Raja killed. But Geetha overhears their conversation. Horrified, she confronts Murthy and begs him not to harm Raja. Murthy refuses to abandon his plan. Geetha threatens to telephone her uncle and reveal everything. Realizing that she could stop them, Danny grabs Geetha. He ties her tightly to a chair and stuffs a cloth into her mouth so that she cannot scream for help. Murthy and Danny then lock the house and leave in search of Raja. What they do not realize is that Raja has been nearby. He breaks into the locked house and finds Geetha helplessly tied to the chair. He frees her and takes her somewhere safe—his own home. There, Geetha discovers something unexpected. Raja actually lives in Madikeri, and he has a sister. Then Raja finally reveals the truth behind everything. Years earlier, Murthy and Raja’s sister had known each other during their college days. Murthy had entered into a relationship with her and she became pregnant. But instead of accepting responsibility, Murthy abandoned her. Devastated, Raja’s sister attempted suicide. Raja managed to save her life, and she later gave birth to Murthy’s child. Geetha is horrified hearing that the man she was preparing to marry had hidden an entire chapter of his past from her—including a woman he had abandoned and a child he had refused to accept. Then comes an even greater revelation. Raja apologizes to Geetha. The story about their previous birth was never true. There had been no prince and Ganga. There had been no tragic love story two hundred years ago. The entire story had been carefully created by Raja. His intention was not to steal Geetha away from Murthy. He wanted to prevent Geetha from unknowingly marrying a man who had abandoned his sister and child. At the same time, he hoped to force Murthy to confront his past and accept responsibility for his own child. Even the mysterious portraits and the supposed evidence of their previous life had been part of the plan. And Raja had not acted alone. Geetha’s uncle already knew the truth about Murthy’s past. Raja had convinced him to cooperate with the elaborate plan because they believed it was the only way to expose Murthy before the marriage took place. Everything Geetha believed about Raja suddenly changes. The man she had considered a madman and a stalker had actually been trying to protect her while fighting for justice for his sister and her child. Eventually, Murthy realizes the seriousness of what he has done. He regrets abandoning Raja’s sister and accepts responsibility for his actions. Murthy’s parents also learn the truth. They accept Raja’s sister and, most importantly, welcome their grandchild into their family. The complicated situation finally comes to an end. But there is one final surprise. After everything they have been through, Geetha’s uncle notices the unusual bond that has developed between Geetha and Raja. The imaginary love story of a prince and a village girl may have been false, but somewhere along the way, something real has begun between them. The man who pretended to be Geetha’s lover from a previous birth may now have the opportunity to become her partner in this one. With her uncle’s blessing, Geetha and Raja finally come together. What began as an unbelievable tale of reincarnation ultimately reveals itself to be a story about responsibility, deception, family and an unexpected love born from an elaborate plan.

== Cast ==
- Rajkumar as Raja and past life prince Raja
- Aarathi as Geetha/Ganga
- K. S. Ashwath as Geetha's uncle
- Cudavalli Chandrashekar as Murthy
- Balakrishna as Lawyer Hayavadan Rao
- Sampath as Doctor
- Thoogudeepa Srinivas as Ganga’s Fiancee
- M. P. Shankar as Danny
- Rajanand as King
- Bhatti Mahadevappa
- Suma Jagdeesh as Raja’s sister
- B.Jaya

== Soundtrack ==
Raja Nanna Raja

Soundtrack album by G. K. Venkatesh
- Released: 1976
- Studio: Prasad Studio
- Genre: Feature film soundtrack
- Length: 19:26
- Label: Saregama

G. K. Venkatesh composed the soundtrack and the lyrics were written by Chi. Udaya Shankar. The album consists of five soundtracks. The song Thanuvu Manavu had another video version which was not used in the movie but that version went on to be used in Kashinath's 1989 movie Preyasi Preethisu. The initial lyrics of the song Nooru Kannu Saaladu was Baare Nanna Mohini. G.K.Venkatesh re-used the tune of Nooru Kannu Saaladu as Maaghamasa Velalo for the 1980 Telugu movie Jathara.

Tracklist
| No. | Title | Lyrics | Singer(s) | Length |
|---|---|---|---|---|
| 1. | "Nooru Kannu Saladu" | Chi. Udaya Shankar | P. B. Sreenivas, S. P. Balasubrahmanyam | 4:33 |
| 2. | "Ninade Nenapu Dinavu" | Chi. Udaya Shankar | P. B. Sreenivas | 3:38 |
| 3. | "Raja Nanna Raja (Title)" | Chi. Udaya Shankar | Instrumental | 2:28 |
| 4. | "Thanuvu Manavu" | Chi. Udaya Shankar | Rajkumar, S. Janaki | 4:25 |
| 5. | "Kalletigintha Ninna" | Chi. Udaya Shankar | Rajkumar, S. Janaki | 4:22 |
| Total length: | | | | 19:26 |
