= Gruhabhanga =

1970 novel by S L Bhyrappa

Gruhabanga
- Author: S. L. Bhyrappa
- Language: Kannada
- Genre: Novel
- Publisher: Sahitya Bhandara, Bangalore
- Publication date: 1970
- Publication place: India
- Media type: Print (Paperback & Hardback)
- Preceded by: Tabbaliyu Neenade Magane (1968)
- Followed by: Nirakarana (1971)
- Website: Official website

Gruhabhanga is a well-known novel by one of the most important novelists in Kannada S. L. Bhyrappa. The plot depicts rural India, starts around the 1920s and ends around the 1960s. The story has the heroic struggle of a woman against her idiotic husband, vicious mother-in-law, superstitious neighbors and pervading poverty. Tiptur, Channarayapatna regions are covered in this novel. This novel is considered an Indian classic and hence National Book Trust, India translated this into all the fourteen major languages of India. In 2003, it was made into a television series by Girish Kasaravalli which was produced by the actress Soundarya.

The novel was first serialised in a Kannada daily in the 1970s. It was later adapted into a television series in 2002 by Girish Kasaravalli. The cast included Lakshmi Chandrashekar, Malavika Avinash, Lohithaswa, Shivaram, Usha Bhandari, Achyuth Kumar and Ganesh Hegde.
