= Avarana =

Sanskrit term for obstruction

Avarana (आवरण) is a Sanskrit term that translates as 'covering' or 'obstruction'. It is considered to be one of the three defects of the mind that hinder spiritual progression. Avarana is a veil of ignorance that dulls the mind and prevents people from seeing their true/higher self. Without lifting the veil of avarana, it is not possible to know Atman or Brahman. Avarana meanings as follows the act of covering or concealing. an enclosed space with a building or group of buildings within it; a compound. a small wall, hedge, wire structure, etc. that encloses such a space. any piece of cloth used as a concealing or separating screen or curtain; a veil. (phil.) the condition or quality of being ignorant; lack of knowledge; ignorance. a flat, usually broad, piece of metal, wood, etc., carried in the hand or worn on the forearm to ward off blows or missiles; a shield. (in a combat) the act or the knack of, warding off blows or missiles. a metal coat to protect oneself from weapon-blows. that which charms or bewitches, as an act of magic. a sliding bar for locking a door, gate, etc.; a bolt.

any line or thing marking a limit; bound; border; boundary.

an additional word, clause, etc. placed as an explanation or comment within two curved lines ( ), [ ] or { }. a set of two such curved lines. Avarana is identified as one of the attributes of maya in Advaita Vedanta. Adi Shankara mentions in his Vivekacūḍāmaṇi (verses 115–118) that avarana is an effect of the tamas guna.
