= Tabbaliyu Neenade Magane =

- Film Poster
- Directed by: Girish Karnad; B. V. Karanth
- Written by: S. L. Bhyrappa (Story); Kanakanahalli Gopi (Dialogue)
- Screenplay by: Girish Karnad; B. V. Karanth
- Based on: Tabbaliyu Neenade Magane by S. L. Bhyrappa
- Produced by: B. M. Venkatesh; Chandulal Jain
- Starring: Nasiruddin Shah
- Cinematography: A. K. Bir
- Edited by: P. Bhakthavathsalam
- Music by: Bhaskar Chandavarkar
- Production company: Maharaja Movies
- Release date: 1977
- Running time: 144 minutes
- Country: India
- Languages: Kannada; Hindi

Tabbaliyu Neenade Magane ( transl. Oh Son, You've Become An Orphan) is a 1977 Indian drama film co-directed by Girish Karnad and B. V. Karanth and starring Naseeruddin Shah. The film was simultaneously in Kannada and Hindi with the latter version titled as Godhuli (transl. Twilight, Dusk or Evening). While the Kannada version starred Sundar Raj and Maanu, the Hindi version starred Om Puri and Kulbhushan Kharbanda, respectively. It is based on the Kannada novel Tabbaliyu Neenade Magane, written by S. L. Byrappa as an allegory for nation-building and the clash of modernity with tradition in rural India. It portrays the story of a modern agriculturist who returns from the US after studying agriculture and brings his American wife to the village.

The film won the Filmfare for ‘Best Film’ (Kannada) and Maanu won ‘Best Actor’ (Kannada) at the 25th Filmfare Awards South (1978). Godhuli was included in the 1984 International Film Festival of India (IFFI). At the 25th National Film Awards, S. P. Ramanathan won the Best Audiography. It won the Filmfare Award for Best Screenplay at the 27th Filmfare Awards for Girish Karnad and B.V. Karanth.

== Plot ==
The movie explores the cultural problems experienced by an American woman, newly married to an Indian, adjusting to Indian norms and customs. It depicts a modern man who studies agriculture in the United States and returns to India with an American wife with different views. The theme is one of alienation from fellow human beings.

== Cast ==
Cast (Kannada)	Cast (Hindi)	Role (Kannada)	Role (Hindi)
Paula Lindsay		Lydia	Lydia
Lakshmi Krishnamurthy		Thaiyavva	Thaiyavva
Naseeruddin Shah		Venkataramana Shastri	Venkataramana Shastri
Sundar Raj	Om Puri	Yengta	Yengta
Maanu	Kulbhushan Kharbanda	Kalingegowda	Nandan Gowda

Kannada

- T. S. Nagabharana
- Sudheer
- Ramakrishna

== Production ==
The film was simultaneously made in Hindi as Godhuli. The casting was different in both languages. The Kannada version has Maanu as the foreign-returned hero, while Kulbhushan Kharbanda portrayed the role in Hindi. For the role of Yengta, Sundar Raja was chosen for Kannada and Om Puri for Hindi. The role of the village priest was initially assigned to two different people however due to a last minute difficulty about the availability of the Kannada actor, Naseerudin Shah did the role in both languages.

== Bibliography ==
- Ray, Bibekananda; Joshi, Naveen (2005). Conscience of the race: India's offbeat cinema. Publications Division, Ministry of Information and Broadcasting, Government of India. ISBN 978-81-230-1298-8.
- Chakravarty, Sumita S. (2011). National Identity in Indian Popular Cinema, 1947-1987. University of Texas Press. ISBN 978-0-292-78985-2.
- DIFF (1978). Indian Cinema. Directorate of Film Festivals, Ministry of Information and Broadcasting.
- Somaaya, Bhawana (2004). Cinema Images And Issues. Rupa Publications. ISBN 978-8129103703.
- Valicha, Kishore (1988). The Moving Image: A Study of Indian Cinema. Orient Longman. ISBN 978-0-86131-681-6.
