= Sakshi (novel) =

1986 novel by S.L. Bhyrappa

- Cover of novel's 2017-18 publication
- Author: S.L. Bhyrappa
- Language: Kannada
- Published: 1986, Sahitya Bhandara, Bangalore
- Publication place: India
- Media type: Print (Paperback)
- Preceded by: Nele
- Followed by: Anchu
- Website: Official website

Sakshi (meaning: The witness) is a novel written by S.L. Bhyrappa, which was first published in 1986. As of May 2018, it had 9 reprints and has been translated into Hindi and English languages. The book has been translated into English by Niyogi Books.
