= Matadana =

1965 novel by S L Bhyrappa

- Cover photo of 2017-18 publication of the novel
- Author: S L Bhyrappa
- Language: Kannada
- Genre: Fiction
- Publisher: Sahitya Bhandara, Balepet, Bangalore.
- Publication date: 1965
- Publication place: India
- Media type: Print (Hardcover & Paperback)
- Preceded by: Doora saridaru
- Followed by: Vamshavruksha
- Website: Official website

Matadana (meaning: voting) is a 1965 novel written by the famous Kannada writer, philosopher, thinker S L Bhyrappa. An award winning Kannada movie Mathadana based on this novel, which was directed by T N Seetharam secured 'Best Regional Film' award at 47th National Film Awards. Matadana reveals the caste based politics and other dynamics that grip the democratic institution of ballot box in India.

== Synopsis as mentioned on the cover page of the book ==
A young man, Shivappa, after completing M.B.B.S wants to serve people of his village. He is attracted by the democratic election mechanism believing that he can serve people better. As the Doctor becomes busy with political campaign a person dies because of lack of treatment. Doctor loses in the election and also the incumbent minister loses against a regional leader N S Sadaravalli's son Prakasha Kumara. A small contractor who had helped the minister by providing financial support commits suicide following the loss in election.

== Plot ==
The novel starts in a village Rangapura near Tumkur in Karnataka. It uses the Tumkur dialect of Kannada language. It is about Doctor Shivappa, medical graduate from Mysore Medical College, who is keen to help society and his village people. Shivappa gains immense popularity among the people across the villages. The story revolves around the politically influential people who uses Shivappa in the upcoming election for their benefit.

=== Characters ===
- Dr.Shivappa
- RangaLakshmi (Shivappa's Love interest)
- Ramalingappa Gowdru
- S R Saadaravalli
- Minister Naagaravalli/ Appaji
- Prakasha Kumara Saadaravalli
- Putta Tammaiah
- Kallamma (Shivappa's Mother)
- Puttakka (Shivappa's elder sister)
- Sannaiah (Shivappa's brother-in-law)

=== Dialogues ===
- "ಈ ನನ್ಮಕ್ಳಿಗೆ ಆಡಿದ್ ಮಾತೈತಾ? ಕೊಟ್ಟ ನಂಬಿಕೆಯೈತಾ ? ರಂಗಪ್ಪನ ಪಾದದಾಗೆ ನಿಂತು ಆಡಿದ ಮಾತಿಗೆ ಈಗ ಹಿಂದ್ಲೇಟು ಒಡೆಯೋ ಸೂಳೆಮಕ್ಳಿಗೆ ಒಳ್ಳೆದಾಗ್ತೈತ ?"
- "ನೋಡು ನಮ್ಮುನ್ನ ಇಂದುಗಡೆ ಆಡಿಕೊಳ್ಲೋರ್ಗೆ ಪ್ರಕಾಶನ ಮದ್ವೆ ಹಿಂಗಾದ್ದುಕ್ಕೆ ಒಂದು ಮಾತು ಸಿಕ್ಕಿದ ಹಂಗೆ ಆಗೈತೆ. ಇನ್ನ ಈ ಡಾಕ್ಟ್ರದ್ದೂ ಆಗ್ದೆ ಇದ್ರೆ ನಮ್ಮ ಮರ್ಯಾದೆ ಒಗ್ಬಿಡ್ತೈತೆ. ಅವನ್ನ ಕರ್ಕಂಡೆ ಬರಬೇಕು"

== Reprints ==
Since its first printing in 1965, the book has had many reprints:

- First printing: 1965
- Second printing: 1969
- Third printing: 1975
- Fourth printing: 1982
- Fifth printing: 1987
- Sixth printing: 1987
- Seventh printing: 1998
- Eighth printing: 2002
- Ninth printing: 2007
- Tenth printing: 2010

=== Kannada novelists ===
- U R Ananthamurthy
