= Nele (novel) =

1983 novel by S L Bhyrappa

- Cover of the novel
- Author: S L Bhyrappa
- Language: Kannada
- Subject: Philosophy
- Genre: Philosophical fiction
- Published: 1983 Sahitya Bhandara, Bangalore
- Publication place: India
- Media type: Print (Hardcover)
- Pages: 170
- Preceded by: Parva
- Followed by: Sakshi
- Website: Official website

Nele (meaning: Base) is a 1983 novel written by S. L. Bhyrappa. This book explores a person's life after his death from philosophical point of view. A friend got to see notes of Javarayi, and which has full of philosophical thoughts about life.

== Characters ==
- Javarayi
- Kalegowda, friend of Javarayi
