= Nirakarana =

1971 novel by S L Bhyrappa

Niraakarana
- Cover of the novel
- Author: S L Bhyrappa
- Language: Kannada
- Genre: Novel
- Published: 1971 Sahitya Bhandara, Bangalore
- Publication place: India
- Media type: Print (Paperback & Hardback)
- Pages: 171
- OCLC: 221816406
- Preceded by: Gruhabhanga (1970)
- Followed by: Grahana (1972)
- Website: Official website

Niraakarna (Kannada: ನಿರಾಕರಣ, Denial/dissent/refusal/negation) is a Kannada language novel written by S L Bhyrappa. This novel is about a man living in the slum area of Mumbai, supporting his family's food and shelter by earning as a job typist, left with five children after his two wives' death. He faces much difficulty caring for the kids by himself, and decides to give them away for adoption. The novel explores the emotional conflicts of both father and children, meanwhile he explores his spiritual path, understand oneself.
