= Yaana (novel) =

2014 novel by S. L. Bhyrappa

- 2nd edition
- Author: S L Bhyrappa
- Language: Kannada
- Subject: Human relationship
- Genre: Scientific fiction
- Publisher: Sahitya Bhandara, Bangalore
- Publication date: 29 July 2014
- Publication place: India
- Media type: Print (Hardcover)
- Pages: 217
- Preceded by: Kavalu
- Followed by: Uttarakaanda
- Website: Official website

Yaana (meaning: Sail) is a novel written by novelist S.L. Bhyrappa, which has a story of two astronauts (a man and a woman) traveling in a spaceship to Proxima Centauri, the closest star to the earth which is around 4-6 light years away.

== Plot ==
Two astronauts (a man and a woman) traveling in a spaceship to Proxima Centauri, the closest star to the earth which is around 4-6 light years away.The journey takes several decades. The novel focuses on scientific problems and human relationships when they are away from the planet Earth. While generating oxygen and food on the spaceship, the other issues are giving birth to children there and nurturing them.
