= Grahana (novel) =

1972 novel by S.L. Bhyrappa

- Cover of novel's 2017-18 publication
- Author: S.L. Bhyrappa
- Language: Kannada
- Published: 1972, Sahitya Bhandara, Bangalore
- Publication place: India
- Media type: Print (Paperback)
- Preceded by: Nirakarana
- Followed by: Daatu
- Website: Official website

Grahana (meaning: Eclipse) is a novel written by S.L. Bhyrappa, which was first published in 1972. As of May 2018, it had 11 reprints.
