= Uttarakaanda (novel) =

2017 novel by S L Bhyrappa

- First edition
- Author: S L Bhyrappa
- Language: Kannada
- Subject: Ramayana
- Genre: Mythology
- Publisher: Sahitya Bhandara, Bangalore
- Publication date: 16 January 2017
- Publication place: India
- Media type: Print (Hardcover)
- Pages: 336
- Preceded by: Yaana (2014)
- Website: Official website

Uttarakaanda is a 2017 Kannada novel by novelist S.L. Bhyrappa, based on the Sanskrit epic, Ramayana. This book was released on 16 January 2017.

== Release history ==
The novel was released on 16 January 2017 and it sold out in a few hours. The publisher announced that they would release a second and third impression immediately. The size of the print run was not disclosed.
