= Bheemakaaya =

1958 novel by S L Bhyrappa

- Cover of the novel
- Author: S L Bhyrappa
- Language: Kannada
- Subject: Psychology, Philosophy
- Genre: Philosophical fiction
- Published: 1958 Sahitya Bhandara, Bangalore
- Publication place: India
- Media type: Print (Hardcover)
- Preceded by: Gatha Janma Matteradu Kathegalu
- Followed by: Belaku Mooditu
- Website: Official website

Bheemakaaya is the first novel written by S.L. Bhyrappa, it got published on 1952. Bheemakaaya means giant, massive, and this book is about a wrestler and his life. Bhyrappa was 18 years old when he wrote this article.
