= Anchu (novel) =

1990 novel by S. L. Bhyrappa

- Cover photo of 2017-18 publication of the novel
- Author: S L Bhyrappa
- Language: Kannada
- Subject: Psychology
- Genre: Psychological fiction
- Published: 1990 Sahitya Bhandara, Bangalore
- Publication place: India
- Media type: Print (Hardcover)
- Pages: 320
- Preceded by: Sakshi
- Followed by: Tantu
- Website: Official website

Anchu is a 1990 Kannada novel by novelist S.L. Bhyrappa. Anchu means edge or boundary. This novel deals with two main characters: one is an educated lady who is deceived in life, and another is an enthusiastic, professionally educated man. The novel has the love story between these two characters and how the lady shows all the anger and frustration on the man who loves her honestly. The novel focus on inner details of the psychological and temperamental variation of the characters without perceivable external events and actions.

This book is translated into Marathi and Hindi.

== Characters ==
- Dr. Amrutha (MA, PhD literature), a professor
- Somashekar, an architect and engineer
