= Kavalu =

2010 novel by S L Bhyrappa

- Cover of the novel
- Author: S L Bhyrappa
- Language: Kannada
- Genre: Fiction
- Publisher: Sahitya Bhandara, Balepet, Bangalore.
- Publication date: 2010
- Publication place: India
- Media type: Print (Hardcover & Paperback)
- Preceded by: Aavarana
- Followed by: Yaana
- Website: Official website

Kavalu is a 2010 Kannada novel by novelist S.L. Bhyrappa. The novel deals with Indian society at the crossroads of the era of globalization. The story revolves around the main character Jaya Kumar.

The book was released on 28 June 2010 and 3700 copies sold out within the first three days. After its release, the author conducted numerous debates, notably in Bangalore and Hubballi. The book was in a Kannada Top-10 list the year it was released.

== Characters ==
- Jai Kumar
- Vaijayanthi Jai Kumar
- Vatsala (Puttakka/Jai Kumar and Vaijayanthi's daughter)
- Dyaavakka (Vaijayanthi Jai Kumar's House maid)
- Mangala Jai Kumar
- Prabhakara (Mangala's Collegemate and Paramour )
- Nachiket (Senior Software Engineer and nephew of Jai Kumar)
- Rajamma (Jai Kumar's mother)
- Shobha Naraayan (Nachiket's mother and Jaikumar's Sister)
- Narayan (Jai Kumar's brother-in-law)
- Keshava (Jai Kumar's Elder Brother)
- Chitra Hosur
- Maala Kerur
- Ila (English Professor )
- Sujaya (Sweety/Ila and Vinaychandra's daughter)
- Vinay Chandra (Ila's former husband)
- Minister (Ila's boyfriend)

== Reprints ==
- First print: 2010
- Second print: 2010
