= Mandra (novel) =

2002 novel by S L Bhyrappa

- Cover of the novel
- Author: S L Bhyrappa
- Language: Kannada
- Subject: Music
- Genre: Musical fiction
- Published: 2002 Sahitya Bhandara, Bangalore
- Publication place: India
- Media type: Print (Hardcover)
- Pages: 684
- OCLC: 830355130
- Preceded by: Saartha
- Followed by: Avarana
- Website: Official website

Mandra is a novel by Kannada writer S L Bhyrappa for which he was awarded the Saraswati Samman for the year 2010. 'Mandra' is one of the most acclaimed epic novels of Bhyrappa. The novel was published by Sahitya Bhandara, Balepet, Bangalore, in 2002. The book has story surrounded by musicians and dancers. The information on how this book was written is present in ′Sandarbha: Samvaada′ (meaning: Context: conversation).

Music and analysis program of the novel, by Shatavadhani Ganesh and other artists
