= Daatu =

1973 Kannada-language novel by S L Bhyrappa

- Cover photo of 2017-18 publication of novel ′Daatu′
- Author: S L Bhyrappa
- Cover artist: Chandranath Acharya
- Language: Kannada
- Genre: Indian Caste System
- Publisher: Sahitya Bhandara, Bangalore
- Publication date: 1973
- Publication place: India
- Media type: Print (Hardcover)
- Pages: 412
- ISBN: 9788126021550
- OCLC: 1010505848
- Preceded by: Grahana
- Followed by: Anveshana
- Website: Official website

Daatu (meaning: cross) is a novel by Kannada writer S L Bhyrappa for which he was awarded the Sahitya Akademi Award for the year 1975. The Book has story which goes through the complex caste system that is deep rooted into Indian society demonstrated through the characters. This book has been translated to 14 major Indian Languages. The novel name indicated the crossing over the boundaries of castes and colors.

The novel was translated into Gujarati by Jaya Mehta, published in 1992.
