= Dharmashree =

Book by S. L. Bhyrappa

- Cover of the novel
- Author: S L Bhyrappa
- Language: Kannada
- Genre: Novel
- Published: 1961 Sahitya Bhandara, Bangalore
- Publication place: India
- Media type: Print (Paperback & Hardback)
- Pages: 264
- Preceded by: Belaku Mooditu (1959)
- Followed by: Doora saridaru (1962)
- Website: Official website

Dharmashree is a Kannada language novel written by S L Bhyrappa. This novel is about a man living who is a true believer of Sanathana Dharma. He converts to Christianity to marry a girl for his true love. The novel explores his inner search on true love versus true religion. He faces various advantages and disadvantages when converted to other religion. Meanwhile, she understand him very well more than himself he could and helps him to solve the internal conflicts. The main theme of the book is exploration of the problems in the society with respect to religions.
