= Tantu =

Good

- Cover photo of novel ′Tantu′
- Author: S L Bhyrappa
- Language: Kannada
- Genre: Fiction
- Published: 1993 Sahitya Bhandara, Balepet, Bangalore.
- Publication place: India
- Media type: Print (Hardcover & Paperback)
- ISBN: 9788189738839
- OCLC: 753478535
- Preceded by: Anchu
- Followed by: Saartha
- Website: Official website

Tantu is a 1993 Kannada novel by novelist S.L. Bhyrappa. Tantu ( meaning 'cord' or 'links') means relations or links between human emotions. This book was translated into English in the year 2010 by Niyogi Books.

In this epic novel, Bhyrappa examines the social, political, moral and psychological fibre of contemporary Indian life, spanning the decades between post-Independence and the declaration of the Emergency under Indira Gandhi. The range of characters is astonishingly comprehensive – the true Gandhian idealist who, despite all odds, holds on to his values; an honest, uncompromising journalist who remains steadfast to his professional ethics; the “liberated” career woman who gains favour in the business world due to her promiscuity; and the academic-politician with a carefully cultivated charm used to seduce impressionable young women. Tantu is panoramic in scope, moving from Bangalore to Mysore, from Banaras to Delhi. Police brutality, goondaism at the village level, the superficial five-star hotel culture and the smuggling of art objects out of the country are all subjects the novel relentlessly examines. Corruption and nepotism in high and low places is portrayed with absolute candour, as is the steady erosion of traditional Indian values. Tantu is a fascinating survey of modern India, examined from many different angles.

The book is a philosophical novel on education, morality, politics and social system in India. This novel has been translated into languages such as English (Tantu: The Loom of Life), Hindi, and Marathi.
