= Saartha =

1998 novel by S. L. Bhyrappa

- The Kannada novel,"ಸಾರ್ಥ", 1998 print
- Author: S. L. Bhyrappa
- Language: Kannada
- Genre: Fiction
- Published: 1998, Sahitya Bhandara, Balepet, Bangalore
- Publication place: India
- Media type: Print (hardcover & paperback)
- ISBN: 9780198098652
- OCLC: 879018156
- Preceded by: Tantu
- Followed by: Mandra
- Website: Official website

Saartha (meaning "caravan") is a historical novel written in the Kannada language by Indian writer S. L. Bhyrappa. Through a caravan, the book explores the whole of 8th-century India, covering the political, economic, artistic and spiritual life of the country. It refers to many historical personalities including Adi Shankaracharya, Maṇḍana Miśra, Ubhaya Bharati and Kumārila Bhaṭṭa and to institutions like Nalanda. Its Sanskrit translation was received by Sanskrit scholars like a work originally written in the language. It has also been translated into Hindi and English in editions published by Oxford University Press, Chennai.
