= Anveshana (novel) =

1976 book by Kannada author S. L. Bhyrappa

- Cover of novel's 2017–18 publication
- Author: S. L. Bhyrappa
- Language: Kannada
- Published: 1976, Sahitya Bhandara, Bangalore
- Publication place: India
- Media type: Print (Paperback)
- Preceded by: Daatu
- Followed by: Parva
- Website: Official website

Anveshana (meaning: Exploration) is a 1976 Kannada novel by S. L. Bhyrappa. As of May 2018, it had 13 reprints and has been translated into Hindi and Marathi languages.
