= Parva (novel) =

Novel by S. L. Bhyrappa

- 19th edition of the novel, released in 2017
- Author: S. L. Bhyrappa
- Original title: ಪರ್ವ
- Language: Kannada
- Genre: Novel
- Publisher: Sahitya Bhandara, Bangalore
- Publication date: 1979
- Publication place: India
- Media type: Print (Paperback & Hardback)
- ISBN: 81-7201-659-X
- OCLC: 31410126
- Dewey Decimal: 894/.81437 20
- LC Class: PL4659.B436 P313 1994
- Preceded by: Anveshana (1976)
- Followed by: Nele (1983)
- Website: Official website

Parva (Epoch) is a novel written by S. L. Bhyrappa in the Kannada language. It is a retelling of the Sanskrit epic Mahabharata, narrated through the personal reflections of the principal characters. The novel is widely acclaimed as a modern classic. Parva is among Bhyrappa's most widely debated and popular works and is considered by many to be his greatest.

== Background ==
Bhyrappa recounts the writing of the novel in an essay, Parva Baredaddu (Kannada: ಪರ್ವ ಬರೆದದ್ದು), in his book Nāneka Barayuttena (ನಾನೇಕೆ ಬರೆಯುತ್ತೇನೆ). A friend, Dr. A Narayanappa, urged Bhyrappa to write his conception of the Mahābhārata as a novel. The author decided to write Parva during a tour in the Garhwal region in the Himalayas. He stayed at a village where polyandry was practiced. Further research revealed that the practice had persisted in the region since the time of Draupadi. Bhyrappa recounts how this experience led him to visit several places in North India mentioned in the Mahābhārata.

Bhyrappa subsequently moved to a new job in Mysore. In Parva Baredaddu, he narrates how the novel "stayed in his mind," and "forced" him to apply for an unpaid vacation and conduct research. His research covered multiple perspectives including the historicity of the Mahābhārata, geography of Bharatavarsha (India), anthropological aspects of the time, techniques of warfare, and philosophical concepts. Bhyrappa visited most of the places listed in the epic over a period of more than a year. He visited the Yadava capital Dwaraka (now believed to be submerged), Lothal, Rajasthan, Rajagriha, Kurukshetra, Old Delhi, and parts of the Panchala territory.

== Translations ==
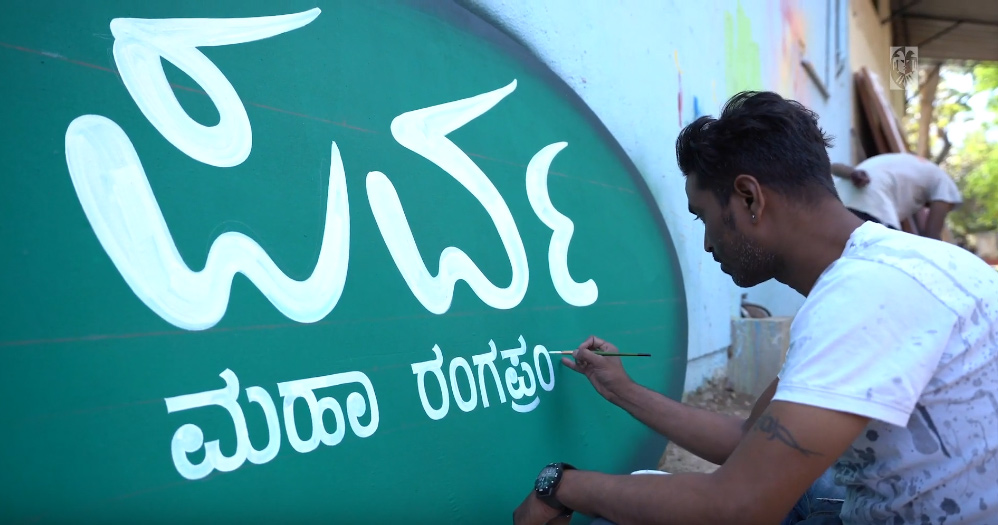
A theatrical play was performed on the novel's basis, in Rangayana, Mysore, in 2021

Parva has been translated into seven Indian languages and three foreign languages. The Indian translations are: Bengali: পর্ব; Hindi: पर्व; Malayalam: പർവ്വം; Marathi: पर्व; Tamil: பருவம்; Telugu: పర్వము; and Sanskrit: पर्व. The Tamil translation of Pavannan and the Telugu translation of Gangisetty Lakshminarayana won the Sahitya Akademi's translation award in 2004.

Among foreign languages, the first translation appeared in English under the title Parva: A Tale of War, Peace, Love, Death, God and Man. It was the work of K. Raghavendra Rao. The Russian translation by Abhai Maurya and Sonu Saini appeared in 2020. It was titled Парва. The Chinese translation (Chinese: 大纪元) appeared in the same year as the Russian one. Parva was translated into Mandarin Chinese by a team of B. R. Deepak and Xu Ke.

== Storyline ==
The novel narrates the story of Mahabharata mostly using monologue as a literary technique. Several principal characters found in the original Mahabharata reminisce almost their entire lives. Both the setting and the context for the reminiscence is the onset of the Kurukshetra War. The novel begins with a conversation in the court of Madra desha. It was the time when the preparations of war had just begun. The episode is followed by reminiscences of Kunti, Draupadi, Bheema and Arjuna. The next part of novel discusses the war from a rational view. The novel seeks to reconstruct the disintegration of a vast community involving the Kauravas and Pandavas.

== Awards ==
In 2007, Parva won the Deraje award.
