= S. L. Bhyrappa =

Indian novelist, philosopher and screenwriter (1931–2025)

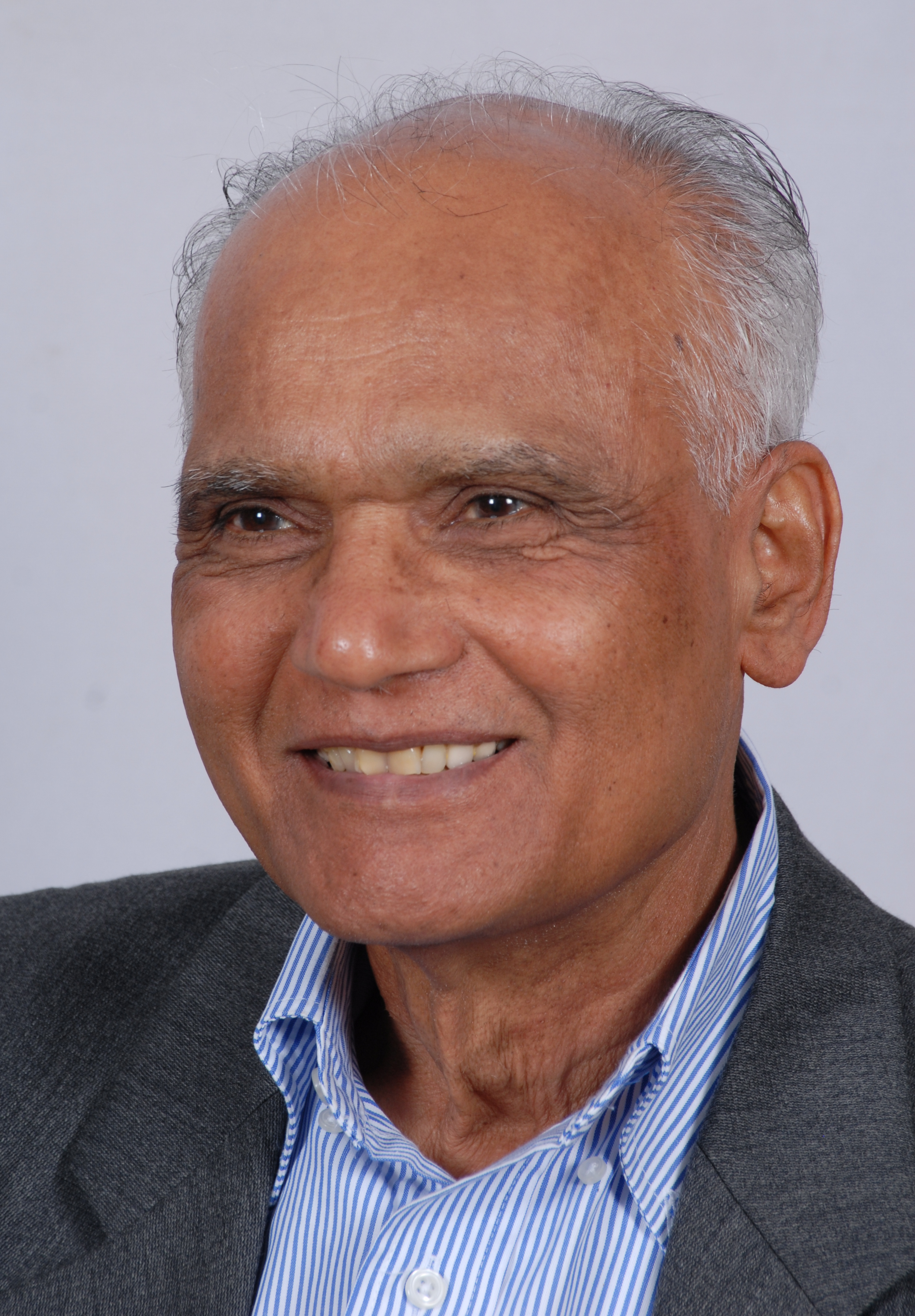
- Born: Santeshivara Lingannaiah Bhyrappa; 20 August 1931; Santeshivara, Hassan district, Kingdom of Mysore, India
- Died: 24 September 2025 (aged 94); Bengaluru, Karnataka, India
- Occupations: Writer, novelist, academic
- Writing career
- Genres: Fiction, history
- Subjects: Philosophy, history, aesthetics
- Notable awards: Padma Bhushan (2023); Padma Shri (2016); Saraswati Samman (2010); Sahitya Akademi Award (1966); Sahitya Akademi Fellowship (2015); National Research Professor (2014)
- Website: slbhyrappa.in

Santeshivara Lingannaiah Bhyrappa (20 August 1931 – 24 September 2025) was an Indian novelist, philosopher and screenwriter who wrote in Kannada. His works are popular in the state of Karnataka and he is widely regarded as one of modern India's popular novelists. His novels are unique in terms of theme, structure, and characterization. He has been among the top-selling authors in the Kannada language and his books have been translated into Hindi and Marathi which have also been bestsellers.

Bhyrappa's works do not fit into any specific genre of contemporary Kannada literature such as Navodaya, Navya, Bandaya, or Dalita, partly because of the range of topics he writes about. His major works have been at the centre of several heated public debates and controversies. He was awarded the 20th Saraswati Samman in 2010. In March 2015, Bhyrappa was awarded the Sahitya Akademi Fellowship. The Government of India awarded him the civilian honour of the Padma Shri in 2016 and the Padma Bhushan in 2023.

== Life and career ==
=== Early life ===
S L Bhyrappa was born into a Hoysala Karnataka Brahmin family on 20 August 1931 in Santeshivara, a village in the Channarayapatna taluk of Hassan district, about 162 kilometres (101 mi) from Bangalore. He lost his mother and brothers to Bubonic plague in his early childhood and took on odd jobs to pay for his education. During his childhood, he was influenced by the writings of A.N. Krishna Rao, Kuvempu, Shivaram Karanth, Gorur Ramaswamy Iyengar etc. His date of birth as per school records is 20 August 1931 and he has declared in his autobiography Bhitti that his actual date of birth is different. (Bhitti p. 50 First edition)

Bhyrappa completed his primary education in Channarayapatna taluk before moving to Mysore where he completed the rest of his education. In his autobiography, Bhitti (Wall) he wrote that he took a break during his high school education. Bhyrappa impulsively quit school, following his cousin's advice and wandered for a year with him. His sojourn led him to Mumbai, where he worked as a railway porter. In Mumbai he met a group of sadhus and joined them to seek spiritual solace. He wandered with them for a few months before returning to Mysore to resume his education.

=== Education ===
Bhyrappa attended Navodaya High School, Channarayapatna, Sharada Vilas High School, Mysore. He earned a B.A (Hons) – Philosophy (Major), at Mysore University and earned an M.A in Philosophy as well as being awarded the gold medal by Mysore University. Bhyrappa's B.A and M.A degrees in Philosophy, were under the tutelage of M. Yamunacharya, who was then Professor of Philosophy at University of Mysore. He earned a Doctor of Philosophy – Satya mattu Soundarya (Truth and Beauty) written in English, at Maharaja Sayajirao University of Baroda.

=== Career ===
S L Bhyrappa was a lecturer of Logic and Psychology at Sri Kadasiddheshwar College, Hubli; Sardar Patel University in Gujarat; NCERT, Delhi; and the Regional College of Education, Mysore from which he retired in 1991. Bhyrappa has two sons and lived with his wife in Mysore.

Bhyrappa's works are published in English, Kannada, and Sanskrit, and taught in Indian Studies and Western Philosophy courses.

=== Death ===
Bhyrappa died in Bengaluru, Karnataka, India on 24 September 2025, at the age of 94.

== Works ==
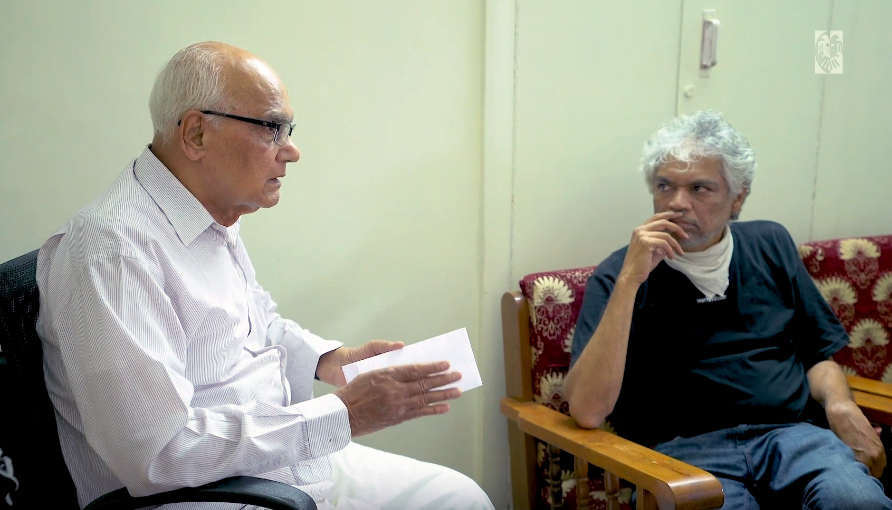
S. L. Bhyrappa (left), Prakash Belawadi (right) discussing the making of theatrical play on novel Parva, in 2020-21

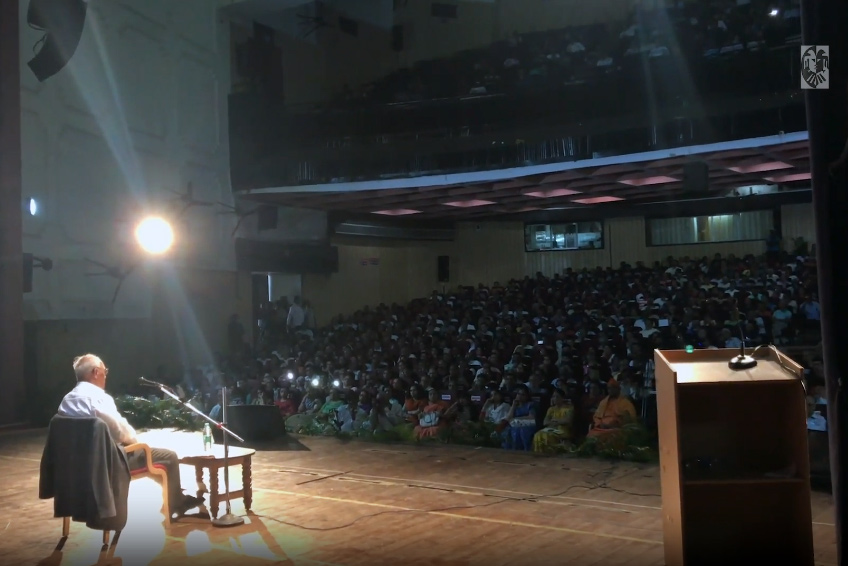
S. L. Bhyrappa addressing an audience

A documentary on S. L. Bhyrappa

Starting with Bheemakaya, first published in 1958, Bhyrappa authored twenty four novels in a career spanning more than five decades. Vamshavruksha, Tabbaliyu Neenade Magane, Matadana and Nayi Neralu were made into films that received critical acclaim. Vamshavruksha has received the Kannada Sahitya Academy Award in 1966 and Daatu (Crossing Over) received both the Kannada and the Kendra Sahitya Academy awards in 1975. Parva, the most critically acclaimed of all his novels narrates the social structure, values and mortality in the epic of Mahabharata very effectively. Bhyrappa reconstructs the Mahabharatha from sociological and anthropological angle, through metaphors in this novel. Tantu, a Kannada novel was published in 1993. Tantu (meaning 'cord' or 'links') explored relations or links between human emotions. It was translated into English in the year 2010 by Niyogi Books. Tantu was followed by Saartha which was published in 1998. And his recent work, Scion, is a beautiful translation of the Kannada original Vamshvrishka by R Ranganath Prasad, getting published by Niyogi Books in 2023.

== Popularity ==
Many of Bhyrappa's novels have been translated into other Indian languages and English. Bhyrappa has been one of the best-selling authors in Kannada for the past twenty-five years, and translations of his books have been best sellers for the past eight years in Marathi and in the past five years in Hindi.

Most of his novels have been reprinted several times. His recently printed novel Aavarana, was sold out even before its release. The novel went on to create a record in Indian literary circles with ten reprints within five months of its publication. His novel Yaana (Journey), was released in August 2014. In 2017 his latest novel Uttarakaanda based on the Hindu epic Ramayana was published. Bhyrappa announced that this novel would be his last novel and due to advanced age he could not undertake any new ventures.

All of his novels are published by Sahitya Bhandara in Bengaluru, Karnataka.

== Controversies ==
Bhyrappa was the centre of several controversies because of his themes and positions on sensitive issues. Some of his prominent novels (such as Vamshavruksha, Tabbaliyu Neenaade Magane, Parva, and Saartha) have strong roots in ancient Indian philosophical tradition, thus inviting severe criticism from Navya writers and from others. Bhyrappa supported N. R. Narayana Murthy when he was criticized by the media and the public regarding the controversy over playing an instrumental version of the national anthem at an important occasion. He also backed N. R. Narayana Murthy regarding the Kaveri issue saying riots and protests are not going to solve the problem. Bhyrappa had a debate with Girish Karnad in the publication Vijaya Karnataka regarding the religious tolerance of 18th century Mysore ruler Tippu Sultan. In Bhyrappa's novel Aavarana, he accuses Tippu Sultan of being a religious fanatic who could not stand Hindus in his court. Bhyrappa has attempted to substantiate his argument based on several historical sources written in India. For example, Bhyrappa has pointed to the usage of the Arabic patronymic bin (used in personal names to mean "son of") in governmental records, which Bhyrappa claimed has continued even into modern times in Karnataka. According to Bhyrappa, this practice, initiated under the rule of Tippu Sultan, was one of several methods used to enforce Islamic rule on Hindus. The book discusses other methods used by Tippu Sultan to convert Hindus to Islam. This view was criticized by Girish Karnad, who has portrayed Tippu Sultan as a secular ruler in his plays. Bhyrappa has countered that Karnad portrays Tippu Sultan inaccurately in his plays.

U.R. Ananthamurthy was a prominent critic of Bhyrappa's novels. Bhyrappa has documented his debate with Ananthamurthy in Bhitti, as well as in a few essays in his book Naaneke Bareyuttene. Bhyrappa's more recent novel Aavarana brings out historical information about what Islamic rule did to ancient Indian social and cultural life. This stirred a major controversy. There were accusations leveled at Bhyrappa of being a Hindu fundamentalist who wanted to divide society on the basis of history, an allegation which Bhyrappa anticipated and tried to refute by referring to notable sources. Ananthamurthy criticized Bhyrappa and his works, calling Aavarana "dangerous". Ananthamurthy accused Bhyrappa of being more of a debater than a storyteller. "He doesn't know what Hindu religion stands for" and "does not know how to write novels". However Bhyrappa claimed that the novel was result of his search for truth and there was no ulterior motive behind the novel. He urged critics to study the reference books mentioned in the novel before arriving at any conclusion about it.

== Accolades ==
=== National awards ===
- Padma Bhushan (Government of India, 2023)
- Bendre National award
- Padma Shri (Government of India, 2016)
- Sahitya Akademi Fellowship (Government of India, 2015)
- National Research Professor (Government of India, 2014)
- Saraswati Samman for his novel Mandra (K.K. Birla Foundation, 2011)
- Sahitya Akademi Award (Government of India, 1975)

=== State awards ===
- Honorary doctorate from Central University of Karnataka (2020)
- Nrupatunga Award (Kannada Sahitya Parishath and BMTC Bengaluru, 2017)
- Sri Krishnadevaraya Award (Telugu Vignana Samithi, 2017)
- Honorary Doctorate from University of Mysore (2015).
- Betageri Krishna Sharma Award (2014)
- Vagvilasini Puraskar (Deenanath Memorial Foundation, Pune, 2012)
- Nadoja Award (2011)
- NTR National Literary Award (2007)
- Honorary Doctorate from Gulbarga University (2007)
- Pampa Award (2005)
- President, Kannada Sahitya Sammelana at Kanakapura (1999)
- Kannada Sahitya Academy award (Government of Karnataka, 1966)

== Bibliography ==
=== Novels ===
- Gatha Janma Matteradu Kathegalu (1955)
- Bheemakaaya (1958)
- Belaku Mooditu (1959)
- Dharmashree (1961)
- Doora saridaru (1962)
- Matadana (1965)
- Vamshavriksha (1965)
- Jalapaata (1967)
- Naayi Neralu (1968)
- Tabbaliyu Neenade Magane (1968)
- Gruhabhanga (1970)
- Nirakarana (1971)
- Grahana (1972)
- Daatu (1973)
- Anveshana (1976)
- Parva (1979)
- Nele (1983)
- Sakshi (1986)
- Anchu (1990)
- Tantu (1993)
- Saartha (1998)
- Mandra (2001)
- Aavarana (2007)
- Kavalu (2010)
- Yaana (2014)
- Uttarakaanda (2017)

=== Autobiography ===
- Bhitti (1996)

=== Criticism ===
- Satya mattu Soundarya (1966) (Doctoral thesis)
- Saahitya mattu Prateeka (1967)
- Kathe mattu Kathavastu (1969)
- Naaneke Bareyuttene? (1980)
- Sandarbha : Samvada (2011)
- Saakshi Parva (2019)

=== Short stories ===
His short story "Avva" was published in the Kasthuri magazine and it's considered his maiden short story.

== Visual media ==
=== Films ===
- Vamshavruksha (1972)
- Tabbaliyu Neenade Magane (1977)
- Matadana (2001)
- Nayi-Neralu (2006)

=== Television series ===
- Gruhabhanga
- Daatu/Ullanghan (Hindi)

== See also ==
- Kannada literature
