= Aavarana =

Book by S. L. Bhyrappa

- 9th edition, released 31 May 2007
- Author: S. L. Bhyrappa
- Language: Kannada
- Genre: Fiction
- Publisher: Sahitya Bhandara, Balepet, Bangalore
- Publication date: 2007
- Publication place: India
- Media type: Print (hardcover & paperback)
- ISBN: 9781536682830
- OCLC: 969827460
- Preceded by: Mandra
- Followed by: Kavalu
- Website: slbhyrappa.in/kn/aavarana/

Aavarana is a 2007 Kannada novel by novelist S. L. Bhyrappa. Aavarana (Sanskrit: आवृ ávṛ meaning 'to conceal') can be translated as "veil," and more broadly as something that conceals, envelops, or hides. Aavarana was sold out even before its release in February 2007. The novel went on to create a record in the Indian literary world by witnessing 10 reprints within five months of its release. The book is controversial, being seen by some as aligned with pro-Hindu, anti-Muslim political currents.

Like most of Bhyrappa's novels, Aavarana generated tremendous debate and discussion. Many prominent intellectuals believe Aavarana dangerously advanced the fundamentalist agenda by tilting at the windmills of history, and that it seeks to divide society on communal lines. The author has vigorously protested the tag that the book is inflammatory by challenging the reviewers to refute the points made in the book.

The novel raises pertinent and searching questions about religion, liberalism and identity and highlights the importance of unshackling oneself from the bonds of false knowledge.

== Translations ==
The novel was a best seller in Kannada, Gujarati, Tamil and other vernacular languages. In February 2014, Aavarana was translated into English by Sandeep Balakrishna, as The Veil.

Language	Title	ISBN	Translator	Publisher
Hindi	Aavaran	9380146775	Pradhan Gurudatta	Kitabghar Prakashan
Sanskrit	Aavaranam	-	Dr. H. R. Vishwas	Sanskrit Bharati
Malayalam	Avaranam	978-93-84582-74-6	Geetha Jayaraman	Kurukshetra Prakashan
Marathi	Avaran	8184980558	Uma Kulkarni	Mehta Publishing House
Tamil	Thirai	-	Sri Jaya Venkatraman	-
English	Aavarana: The Veil	8129124882	Sandeep Balakrishna	Rupa Publications India
Gujarati	Aavaran	-	Siddha Dixit	-
Telugu	Aavarana	978-93-86763-71-6	Aripirala Suvarna	Emesco books

== Plot summary ==
Lakshmi, a rebellious, free-spirited and intelligent film-maker, breaks ties with her staunchly Gandhian father to marry Amir, the man she loves. She even agrees reluctantly to Amir's request that she convert to Islam, as a formality and change her name to Razia. However, she is shocked to discover that her husband is not the open-minded, progressive individual he claimed to be. For after marriage, Amir takes his family's side in trying to force her to follow the more rigorous tenets of their faith. This sets her off on a personal journey into India's history to uncover the many layers of religion, caste and creed.

When she begins writing a historical novel set in the Mughal era, she uncovers violent, disturbing aspects of Islamic rule in India that had been whitewashed or suppressed in official histories.

== Characters ==
- Lakshmi alias Razia
- Aameer (Lakshmi's husband)
- Nazeer (Lakshmi's son)
- Narase Gowdru/ Nasrasimhe Gowdru (Lakshmi's father)
- Prof. LN Shastri
- Elizabeth (L N Shastri's wife)
- Digantha (L N Shastri's son)
- Aruna (L N Shastri's daughter)

== Criticism ==
Aavarana stirred a major controversy in Karnataka. There has been accusations that Bhyrappa is a Hindu fundamentalist who wants to divide society on the basis of history, an allegation which Bhyrappa himself anticipates and tries to refute in the novel. U.R. Ananthamurthy, well known in Kannada literature, has criticised Bhyrappa and his works, terming Aavarana as dangerous. He said that Bhyrappa was a debater who "doesn't know what Hindu religion stands for" and "does not know how to write novels". Kannada Sahitya Parishat president Prof Chandrashekhar Patil has referred to Aavarana as the textbook of Chaddi (a slang for RSS cadres). Booker Prize-winning Indian author Aravind Adiga wrote an article in Outlook in which he writes, "the term Aavarana now describes what has happened to S.L. Bhyrappa himself: swallowed by his weakest novel, passed over for the Jnanpith (the traditional crown for the bhasha writer), and in danger of having a fanbase composed entirely of bigots."

Sumana Mukherjee, in her review of the book for Mint, wrote: "Aavarana —originally published in Kannada in 2007—is compelling, even convincing. But it is also self-serving, divisive and short-sighted, if not wilfully blind to the pitfalls of chest-thumping majoritarianism. Propaganda, by nature, is seductive; it feeds into half-baked concepts and beliefs to give them shape and brooks little opposition or questioning. This, perhaps, is Aavarana‘s greatest failure as a work of literature: It takes no prisoners, offers no room for dissent or doubt."

S.L. Bhyrappa has reiterated that something was written in his novel. According to the author, the book is the result of his search for true history. He stated: "I have referred to hundreds of history books before writing the novel. However, if anyone has doubts about the facts can refer to the books I have listed in my book. Out of my interest, I have studied history and my findings have resulted in a creative piece of work. I am fed up with debates and discussions on Aavarana. Allow me to think on something else". The novel reiterates "if we don't study history, it repeats".
